= 2015–16 Beşiktaş J.K. season =

Beşiktaş
2015–16 season
- President: Fikret Orman
- Head coach: Şenol Güneş
- Stadium: Vodafone Park; Atatürk Olympic Stadium; Fatih Terim Stadium
- Süper Lig: 1st
- Turkish Cup: Quarter-finals
- UEFA Europa League: Group stage
- Top goalscorer: League: Mario Gómez (26); All: Mario Gómez (28)
Home colours	Away colours	Third colours

The 2015–16 season was the 112th year of Beşiktaş J.K. and their 57th consecutive year in the Süper Lig.

== Club ==
=== Board of directors ===
Position	Staff
President	Fikret Orman
Vice-President	Ahmet Nur Çebi
Vice-President	Deniz Atalay
Vice-President	Umut Güner
General Secretary	Ahmet Ürkmezgil
Member	Ahmet Kavalcı
Member	Melih Sami Esen
Member	Metin Albayrak
Member	Faik Akdil
Member	Yalçın Kaya Yılmaz
Member	Erdal Torunoğulları
Member	Hakan Özköse
Member	Erdal Karacan
Member	Berkan Gocay
Member	Mete Vardar
Member	Emre Kocadağ

=== Technical Staff ===
Position	Staff
Manager	(Turkey) Şenol Güneş
Coach	(Turkey) Tamer Tuna (Turkey) Şeref Çiçek (Turkey) Dolu Arslan (Turkey) Mehmet Kulaksızoğlu
Fitness Coach	(Spain) Miguel Peiró
Goalkeeping Coach	(Spain) José Sambade Carreira
Analysis	(Turkey) Eren Şafak

=== Medical Staff ===
Position	Staff
Medical Director and Doctor	(Turkey) Sarper Çetinkaya
Doctor	(Turkey) Murat Çevik
Physiotherapist - Osteopath	(Turkey) Zeki Çetin (Turkey) Aşkın Dede (Turkey) Mehmet Alpözgen
Masseur	(Turkey) Osman Doğru (Turkey) Kadir Beşiktaş (Turkey) Cemil Karataş

=== Grounds ===
Atatürk Olympic Stadium and Fatih Terim Stadium is the home stadium for Beşiktaş; however, their new home stadium, the Vodafone Park, will finish construction in 2016.

Ground	Capacity
Vodafone Park; Atatürk Olympic Stadium; Fatih Terim Stadium	41.903; 76.092; 17,300

Training ground
Ümraniye Nevzat Demir Facilities

=== Kit ===
Uniform Manufacturer: Adidas
Chest Advertising's: Vodafone
Back Advertising's: Beko
Arm Advertising's: Kalde
Short Advertising's: Coca-Cola

Home
Away
Third

=== Sponsorship ===
Licensee	Product
Vodafone	Main Sponsor
Adidas	Technical Sponsor
Beko	Official Sponsor
Kalde	Official Sponsor
Integral Forex	Official Sponsor
Mogaz	Official Sponsor
RMK Marine	Official Sponsor
Acıbadem Healthcare Group	Official Sponsor
Fleetcorp	Official Sponsor
Turkish Airlines	Official Sponsor
Sarar	Official Sponsor
Coca-Cola	Official Sponsor
Doğuş Otomotiv	Official Sponsor
Diversey	Official Sponsor
Yurtiçi Kargo	Official Sponsor

Licensee	Product
GNC	Official Supplier
Klinik 32	Official Supplier
Gloria Hotels & Resorts	Official Supplier
Acıbadem Mobil	Official Supplier
Passolig	Official Supplier
Sırma	Official Supplier
Majorworx	Official Supplier
Gen3Creative	Official Supplier

== Squad ==
As of match played 18 May 2016

No.	Name	Nationality	Position	Date of birth (Age (Note: Age as of the end of the season))	Signed from	Signed In	Apps.	Goals
Goalkeepers
27	Günay Güvenç	(Turkey)	GK	25 June 1991 (aged 24)	Stuttgarter Kickers	2013	21	0
29	Tolga Zengin (captain)	(Turkey)	GK	10 October 1983 (aged 32)	Trabzonspor	2013	103	0
71	Denys Boyko	(Ukraine)	GK	29 January 1988 (aged 28)	Dnipro Dnipropetrovsk	2016	5	0
Defenders
2	Serdar Kurtuluş	(Turkey)	DF	23 July 1987 (aged 28)	Gaziantepspor	2013	66	0
3	İsmail Köybaşı	(Turkey)	DF	10 July 1989 (aged 26)	Gaziantepspor	2009	140	2
6	Duško Tošić	(Serbia)	DF	19 January 1985 (aged 31)	Gençlerbirliği	2015	24	0
14	Alexis	(Spain)	DF	4 August 1985 (aged 30)	Getafe	2016	12	1
30	Marcelo	(Brazil)	DF	20 May 1987 (aged 28)	loan from Hannover 96	2016	16	2
32	Andreas Beck	(Germany)	DF	13 March 1987 (aged 29)	1899 Hoffenheim	2015	42	0
44	Rhodolfo	(Brazil)	DF	11 August 1986 (aged 29)	Grêmio	2015	27	1
52	Furkan Akbulut	(Turkey)	DF	13 November 1996 (aged 19)	Academy	2015	1	0
Midfielders
5	José Sosa	(Argentina)	MF	19 June 1985 (aged 30)	Metalist Kharkiv	2014	39	5
7	Gökhan Töre	(Turkey)	MF	20 January 1992 (aged 24)	Rubin Kazan	2014	111	19
8	Veli Kavlak	(Austria)	MF	3 November 1988 (aged 27)	Rapid Wien	2011	146	8
10	Olcay Şahan	(Turkey)	MF	26 May 1987 (aged 28)	1. FC Kaiserslautern	2012	160	33
13	Atiba Hutchinson	(Canada)	MF	8 February 1983 (aged 33)	PSV	2013	116	5
15	Oğuzhan Özyakup	(Turkey)	MF	23 September 1992 (aged 23)	Arsenal	2012	141	22
17	Ricardo Quaresma	(Portugal)	MF	26 September 1983 (aged 32)	Porto	2015	114	23
18	Tolgay Arslan	(Germany)	MF	16 August 1990 (aged 25)	Hamburger SV	2015	29	2
20	Necip Uysal	(Turkey)	MF	24 January 1991 (aged 25)	Academy	2009	227	5
21	Kerim Frei	(Turkey)	MF	19 November 1993 (aged 22)	Fulham	2013	95	9
24	Serkan Yavuz	(Turkey)	MF	15 August 1996 (aged 19)	Academy	2015	1	0
25	Devrim Taşkaya	(Turkey)	MF	7 January 1997 (aged 19)	Academy	2015	1	0
67	Muhammed Enes Durmuş	(Turkey)	MF	8 January 1997 (aged 19)	Academy	2016	3	0
97	Eslem Öztürk	(Turkey)	MF	1 December 1997 (aged 18)	Academy	2014	2	0
Strikers
11	Mustafa Pektemek	(Turkey)	FW	11 August 1988 (aged 27)	Gençlerbirliği	2011	117	20
23	Cenk Tosun	(Turkey)	FW	7 June 1991 (aged 24)	Gaziantepspor	2014	71	26
33	Mario Gómez	(Germany)	FW	10 July 1985 (aged 30)	loan from Fiorentina	2015	41	28
50	Hamza Küçükköylü	(Turkey)	FW	10 June 1996 (aged 19)	Antalyaspor	2015	2	0
Players who left during the season
22	Ersan Gülüm	(Turkey)	DF	17 May 1987 (aged 29)	Adanaspor	2011		
31	Ramon	(Brazil)	DF	6 May 1988 (aged 28)	Corinthians	2014	70	5

=== On loan ===
Note: Flags indicate national team as defined under FIFA eligibility rules; some limited exceptions apply. Players may hold more than one non-FIFA nationality.

No. / Pos. / Nation / Player; 17 / FW / TUR / Ömer Şişmanoğlu (at Antalyaspor)	No. / Pos. / Nation / Player; 22 / MF / ARM / Aras Özbiliz (at Rayo Vallecano)

== Transfers ==
=== In ===
Date	Position	Nationality	Name	From	Fee	Ref.
1 July 2015	DF	(Serbia)	Duško Tošić	Gençlerbirliği		
1 July 2015	MF	(Argentina)	José Sosa	Metalist Kharkiv		
4 July 2015	DF	(Germany)	Andreas Beck	1899 Hoffenheim		
22 July 2015	MF	(Portugal)	Ricardo Quaresma	Porto		
24 July 2015	DF	(Brazil)	Rhodolfo	Grêmio		
21 January 2016	DF	(Spain)	Alexis	Getafe		
22 January 2016	GK	(Ukraine)	Denys Boyko	Dnipro Dnipropetrovsk		
23 January 2016	MF	(Armenia)	Aras Özbiliz	Spartak Moscow		

=== Out ===
Date	Position	Nationality	Name	To	Fee	Ref.
28 June 2015	FW	(Senegal)	Demba Ba	Shanghai Shenhua		
1 July 2015	DF	(Czech Republic)	Tomáš Sivok	Bursaspor		
2 July 2015	DF	(Turkey)	Atınç Nukan	RB Leipzig		
19 July 2015	FW	(Slovakia)	Filip Hološko	Sydney FC		
6 August 2015	DF	(Turkey)	Berat Cetinkaya	Bayrampaşaspor		
6 August 2015	MF	(Turkey)	Muhammed Demirci	Mouscron		
28 August 2015	GK	(Turkey)	Cenk Gönen	Galatasaray		
12 January 2016	DF	(Brazil)	Ramon	Antalyaspor		
5 February 2016	DF	(Turkey)	Ersan Gülüm	Hebei China Fortune		
1 February 2016	MF	(Turkey)	Hasan Türk	Anadolu Bağcılar		

=== Loans in ===
Date from	Position	Nationality	Name	From	Date to	Ref.
30 July 2015	FW	(Germany)	Mario Gómez	Fiorentina	End of season	
1 February 2016	DF	(Brazil)	Marcelo	Hannover 96	End of season	

=== Loans out ===
Date from	Position	Nationality	Name	To	Date to	Ref.
6 August 2015	MF	(Turkey)	Hasan Türk	Bayrampaşaspor	6 January 2016	
6 August 2015	FW	(Turkey)	Sinan Kurumuş	Bayrampaşaspor	End of season	
28 August 2015	FW	(Turkey)	Ömer Şişmanoğlu	Konyaspor	18 January 2016	
28 August 2015	FW	(Turkey)	Furkan Yaman	Eyüpspor	End of season	
15 January 2016	DF	(Colombia)	Pedro Franco	San Lorenzo	End of season	
19 January 2016	FW	(Turkey)	Ömer Şişmanoğlu	Antalyaspor	End of season	
26 January 2016	MF	(Armenia)	Aras Özbiliz	Rayo Vallecano	End of season	
30 January 2016	DF	(Turkey)	Ümit Karaal	Bayrampaşaspor	End of season	
1 February 2016	DF	(Sweden)	Alexander Milošević	Hannover 96	End of season	

== Competitions ==
=== Süper Lig ===
==== League table ====
Pos	Team	Pld	W	D	L	GF	GA	GD	Pts	Qualification or relegation
1	Beşiktaş (C)	34	25	4	5	75	35	+40	79	Qualification for the Champions League group stage
2	Fenerbahçe	34	22	8	4	60	27	+33	74	Qualification for the Champions League third qualifying round
3	Konyaspor	34	19	9	6	44	33	+11	66	Qualification for the Europa League group stage (Note: Since the winners of the 2015–16 Turkish Cup, Galatasaray, were excluded from European competitions by UEFA, the Europa League group stage berth awarded to the Turkish Cup winners was transferred to the third-placed team (Konyaspor), the third qualifying round berth was awarded to the fourth-placed team (İstanbul Başakşehir), and the second qualifying round berth was awarded to the fifth-placed team (Osmanlıspor).)
4	İstanbul Başakşehir	34	16	11	7	54	36	+18	59	Qualification for the Europa League third qualifying round
5	Osmanlıspor	34	14	10	10	52	36	+16	52	Qualification for the Europa League second qualifying round

Source: Süper Lig, Soccerway
Rules for classification: 1) Points; 2) Head-to-head points; 3) Head-to-head goal difference; 4) Head-to-head goals scored; 5) Goal difference; 6) Goals scored; 7) Play-off.
(C) Champions

==== Result summary ====
Overall								Home						Away					
Pld	W	D	L	GF	GA	GD	Pts	W	D	L	GF	GA	GD	W	D	L	GF	GA	GD
34	25	4	5	75	35	+40	79	14	1	2	38	14	+24	11	3	3	37	21	+16

Last updated: 18 May 2016.
Source: tff.org

==== Results by round ====
Round	1	2	3	4	5	6	7	8	9	10	11	12	13	14	15	16	17	18	19	20	21	22	23	24	25	26	27	28	29	30	31	32	33	34
Ground	A	H	A	H	A	H	A	H	A	H	A	H	H	A	H	A	H	H	A	H	A	H	A	H	A	H	A	H	A	A	H	A	H	A
Result	W	L	W	W	D	W	W	W	W	D	W	W	L	W	W	W	W	W	W	W	D	W	L	W	W	W	L	W	W	D	W	W	W	L
Position	1	8	3	3	2	1	1	1	1	1	1	1	2	1	1	1	1	1	1	1	1	1	1	1	1	1	1	1	1	1	1	1	1	1

Updated to match(es) played on 18 May 2016. Source: tff.org
A = Away; H = Home; W = Win; D = Draw; L = Loss

==== Matches ====
16 August 2015 1	Mersin İdman Yurdu	2–5	Beşiktaş	Mersin
22:00 EEST	Nakoulma 20', 89'; Taş (red card) 64'; Vederson (yellow card) 72'	Report	Tosun 9', 44', 68'; Özyakup (yellow card) 50'; Şahan 73'; Zengin (yellow card) 87'; Frei 90+2'	Stadium: Mersin Stadium; Attendance: 12,300; Referee: Bülent Yıldırım

22 August 2015 2	Beşiktaş	1–2	Trabzonspor	Istanbul
21:45 EEST	Ramon (yellow card) 23'; Beck (yellow card) 52'; Quaresma 56', (red card) 60'; Gülüm (yellow card) 90+3'	Report	Mbia (yellow card) 22'; Zengin (yellow card) 47', (goal) 85'; Erdoğan 53'; Dursun (yellow card) 89'	Stadium: Atatürk Olympic Stadium; Attendance: 28,422; Referee: Ali Palabıyık

28 August 2015 3	Gaziantepspor	0–4	Beşiktaş	Gaziantep
21:15 EEST	Arokoyo (yellow card) 43'; Abuda (yellow card) 63'; Kayalı (yellow card) 75'	Report	Özyakup (yellow card) 51', (goal) 76'; Tosun 83' (pen.); Şahan 87'; Frei 90'	Stadium: Kamil Ocak Stadium; Attendance: 5,487; Referee: Cüneyt Çakır

13 September 2015 4	Beşiktaş	2–0	İstanbul Başakşehir	Istanbul
17:00 EEST	Gómez 15', 62'; Töre (yellow card) 54'	Report	İrtegün (yellow card) 32'; Ağçay (yellow card) 40'; Mossoró (yellow card) 70'	Stadium: Atatürk Olympic Stadium; Attendance: 10,419; Referee: Serkan Çınar

21 September 2015 5	Gençlerbirliği	1–1	Beşiktaş	Ankara
20:00 EEST	Tošić 23' (o.g.); Skúlason (yellow card) 38'; Kahveci (yellow card) 44'; Djalma (yellow card) 69'; Hopf (yellow card) 88'	Report	Şahan (yellow card) 45'; Gómez (yellow card) 54'; Necip Uysal (yellow card) 58'; Töre 67'; Gülüm (yellow card) 83'	Stadium: 19 Mayıs Stadium; Attendance: 7,802; Referee: Fırat Aydınus

27 September 2015 6	Beşiktaş	3–2	Fenerbahçe	Istanbul
19:00 EEST	Kjær 20' (o.g.); Gómez 24', 74'; Gülüm (yellow card) 58'; Özyakup (yellow card) 66'; Uysal (yellow card) 90+2'	Report	Tošić 32' (o.g.); Nani (yellow card) 45'; Van Persie 65'	Stadium: Atatürk Olympic Stadium; Attendance: 27,356; Referee: Halis Özkahya

4 October 2015 7	Eskişehirspor	1–2	Beşiktaş	Eskişehir
17:00 EEST	Toko (yellow card) 8'; Çek (yellow card) 50'; Ben Khalifa (yellow card) 59'; Gekas 87'	Report	Quaresma (yellow card) 15'; Gómez 33', 56'	Stadium: Atatürk Stadium; Attendance: 8,560; Referee: Deniz Ateş Bitnel

18 October 2015 8	Beşiktaş	1–0	Çaykur Rizespor	Istanbul
20:00 EEST	Quaresma 63'	Report	Yalçın (yellow card) 47'; Altınay (yellow card) 65'	Stadium: Başakşehir Stadium; Attendance: 6,760; Referee: Alper Ulusoy

26 October 2015 9	Antalyaspor	1–5	Beşiktaş	Antalya
20:00 EEST	Gör (yellow card) 2'; Makoun (yellow card) 3'; Eto'o 21', (yellow card) 67'	Report	Uysal 14'; Quaresma 26'; Rhodolfo (yellow card) 32'; Gülüm (yellow card) 56'; Gómez 63'; Şahan 72'; Tosun 89'	Stadium: Antalya Stadium; Attendance: 19,691; Referee: İlker Meral

30 October 2015 10	Beşiktaş	3–3	Kasımpaşa	Istanbul
21:45 EEST	Uysal (yellow card) 18'; Rhodolfo 28'; Quaresma (yellow card) 43'; Gómez 52'; Özyakup 90+3' (pen.)	Report	Castro (yellow card) 15'; Derdiyok 24', 67'; Sarı (yellow card) 32'; Veigneau (yellow card) 37'; Donk 40'; Büyük (yellow card) 58'; Omeruo (yellow card) 78'	Stadium: Başakşehir Stadium

8 November 2015 11	Bursaspor	0–1	Beşiktaş	Bursa
20:15 EEST	Tasdemir (yellow card) 49'; Josué (yellow card) 54'; Nounkeu (yellow card) 90+2'	Report	Beck (yellow card) 28'; Köybaşı (yellow card) 58'; Quaresma (yellow card) 66'; Özyakup 89'	Stadium: Atatürk Stadium; Attendance: 14,525; Referee: Mete Kalkavan

22 November 2015 12	Beşiktaş	2–0	Sivasspor	Istanbul
19:00 EEST	Gómez 43' (pen.); Gülüm (yellow card) 45'; Uysal (yellow card) 83'; Beck (yellow card) 90+1'; Özyakup 90+2'	Report	Koçak (yellow card) 42'; Cicinho (yellow card) 45'	Stadium: Başakşehir Stadium; Attendance: 12,102; Referee: Hüseyin Göcek

29 November 2015 13	Beşiktaş	0–2	Akhisar Belediyespor	Istanbul
17:00 EEST	Şahan (yellow card) 40'; Özyakup (yellow card) 65'; Tosun (yellow card) 74'; Quaresma (yellow card) 89'	Report	Vural 5', (yellow card) 41'; Sami 40'; Douglão (yellow card) 54'; Cebe (yellow card) 58'	Stadium: Başakşehir Stadium; Attendance: 11,455; Referee: Barış Şimşek

5 December 2015 14	Kayserispor	1–2	Beşiktaş	Kayseri
19:00 EEST	Biseswar 17'	Report	Gómez 12'; Rhodolfo (yellow card) 14'; Sosa 41'; Pektemek (yellow card) 89'	Stadium: Kadir Has Stadium; Attendance: 6,341; Referee: Bülent Yıldırım

14 December 2015 15	Beşiktaş	2–1	Galatasaray	Istanbul
20:00 EEST	Gómez (yellow card) 45', (goal) 56'; Özyakup (yellow card) 58'; Töre 74'	Report	Öztekin (yellow card) 52'; Sneijder 54'; Adın (yellow card) 61'; İnan (yellow card) 67'; Chedjou (yellow card) 90'; Kaya (yellow card) 90+3'	Stadium: Atatürk Olympic Stadium; Attendance: 25,801; Referee: Mete Kalkavan

21 December 2015 16	Osmanlıspor	2–3	Beşiktaş	Ankara
20:00 EEST	Rusescu 21'; Özer (yellow card) 23'; Ndiaye 44'; Çağıran (yellow card) 55'	Report	Köybaşı (yellow card) 18'; Gómez 34'; Özyakup (yellow card) 45'; Sosa 49', 90'; Uysal (yellow card) 78'	Stadium: Osmanlı Stadium; Attendance: 4,440; Referee: Alper Ulusoy

27 December 2015 17	Beşiktaş	4–0	Konyaspor	Istanbul
19:00 EEST	Özyakup 50'; Quaresma (yellow card) 56'; Gómez 64', (yellow card) 84'; Töre (yellow card) 67', (goal) 69'; Frei 80'; Rhodolfo (yellow card) 84'	Report	İnceman (yellow card) 38'; Turan (yellow card) 56'	Stadium: Başakşehir Stadium; Attendance: 13,973; Referee: Serkan Çınar

17 February 2016 18	Beşiktaş	1–0	Mersin İdman Yurdu	Istanbul
19:30 EEST	Tošić (yellow card) 58'; Uysal (yellow card) 59'; Sosa 74'	Report	Mitrović (yellow card) 69'; Pedriel (yellow card) 73'	Stadium: Başakşehir Stadium; Attendance: 7,385; Referee: Barış Şimşek

15 March 2016 19	Trabzonspor	0–2	Beşiktaş	Trabzon
19:30 EEST	Douglas (yellow card) 71'	Report	Gómez 76'; Şahan 86'	Stadium: Hüseyin Avni Aker Stadium; Attendance: 14,615; Referee: Bülent Yıldırım

7 February 2016 20	Beşiktaş	4–0	Gaziantepspor	Istanbul
19:00 EEST	Töre 38'; Özyakup 42'; Gómez 61', 70'; Köybaşı (yellow card) 64'	Report	Gücer (yellow card) 81'	Stadium: Başakşehir Stadium; Attendance: 15,031; Referee: Cüneyt Çakır

14 February 2016 21	İstanbul Başakşehir	2–2	Beşiktaş	Istanbul
19:00 EEST	Višća 25'; Batdal (yellow card) 42'; İrtegün (yellow card) 52'; Tekdemir 54'; Epureanu (yellow card) 55'; Doka Madureira (yellow card) 62'; Belözoğlu (yellow card) 67'	Report	Alexis (yellow card) 6'; Tosun 78'; Hutchinson 84'	Stadium: Başakşehir Stadium; Attendance: 6,870; Referee: Ali Palabıyık

22 February 2016 22	Beşiktaş	1–0	Gençlerbirliği	Istanbul
20:00 EEST	Şahan (yellow card) 48'; Gómez 64'; Quaresma (yellow card) 88'	Report	Çiftçi (yellow card) 57'; El Kabir (yellow card) 68'; Kahveci (yellow card) 84'	Stadium: Başakşehir Stadium; Attendance: 14,608; Referee: Halis Özkahya

29 February 2016 23	Fenerbahçe	2–0	Beşiktaş	Istanbul
20:00 EEST	Şen 3', (yellow card) 66'; Alves (yellow card) 11'; Erkin (yellow card) 20'; Nani 82', (yellow card) 79'	Report	Quaresma (yellow card) 20'; Sosa (yellow card) 66'	Stadium: Şükrü Saracoğlu Stadium; Attendance: 43,182; Referee: Cüneyt Çakır

7 March 2016 24	Beşiktaş	3–1	Eskişehirspor	Istanbul
20:00 EEST	Hutchinson 29'; Gómez 35', 78'	Report	Méyé (yellow card) 71'; Toko (yellow card) 74'; Bokila (yellow card) 80'; Hadžić 89'	Stadium: Başakşehir Stadium; Attendance: 6,340; Referee: Mete Kalkavan

12 March 2016 25	Çaykur Rizespor	1–2	Beşiktaş	Rize
19:00 EEST	Duruer (yellow card) 14'; Makiadi (yellow card) 21'; Özek (yellow card) 39'; Altınay (yellow card) 60'; Oboabona (yellow card) 86'; Chevalier 89'	Report	Sosa 16'; Frei 33'; Alexis (yellow card) 80'	Stadium: Rize Şehir Stadium; Attendance: 7,899; Referee: Serkan Çınar

19 March 2016 26	Beşiktaş	1–0	Antalyaspor	Istanbul
19:00 EEST	Quaresma (yellow card) 11'; Özyakup 27'; Uysal (yellow card) 85'	Report	Etame (yellow card) 40'	Stadium: Başakşehir Stadium; Attendance: 13,759; Referee: Hüseyin Göcek

4 April 2016 27	Kasımpaşa	2–1	Beşiktaş	Istanbul
20:00 EEST	Arslan (yellow card) 17'; Del Valle 29'; Scarione 49'; Popov (yellow card) 90+5'	Report	Sosa 28', (yellow card) 90+5'; Özyakup (yellow card) 45+3'; Marcelo (yellow card) 54'	Stadium: Recep Tayyip Erdoğan Stadium; Attendance: 4,517; Referee: Mete Kalkavan

9 April 2016 28	Beşiktaş	3–2	Bursaspor	Istanbul
19:00 EEST	Gómez 20', 57'; Alexis 51'; Quaresma (yellow card) 90+5' (yellow-red card) 90+6'	Report	Sivok (yellow card) 23'; Traoré 27'; Hosogai (yellow card) 45' (yellow-red card) 90+6'; Faty (yellow card) 55'; Batalla (yellow card) 58'; Karacan (yellow card) 68'; Stoch 71', (yellow card) 90'	Stadium: Vodafone Arena; Attendance: 38,420; Referee: Barış Şimşek

16 April 2016 29	Sivasspor	1–2	Beşiktaş	Sivas
19:00 EEST	Öztürk (yellow card) 61'; Chahechouhe 90+3'	Report	Gómez 58'; Özyakup 62' (pen.); Tosun (yellow card) 89'; Beck (yellow card) 90+2'	Stadium: 4 Eylül Stadium; Attendance: 10,172; Referee: Halis Özkahya

23 April 2016 30	Akhisar Belediyespor	3–3	Beşiktaş	Manisa
19:00 EEST	Osmanpaşa (yellow card) 35' (yellow-red card) 90+1'; Rodallega 44', 54', 78'; Custódio (yellow card) 46'	Report	Gómez 14'; Şahan 47'; Tosun 90'	Stadium: 19 Mayıs Stadium; Attendance: 12,094; Referee: Cüneyt Çakır

30 April 2016 31	Beşiktaş	4–0	Kayserispor	Istanbul
19:00 EEST	Gómez 10'; Özyakup 23'; Quaresma (yellow card) 26', (goal) 34'; Tosun 90+1'	Report	Türüç (yellow card) 76'; Akbaş (yellow card) 80'; Yavru (yellow card) 81'	Stadium: Vodafone Arena; Attendance: 33,955; Referee: Serkan Çınar

8 May 2016 32	Galatasaray	0–1	Beşiktaş	Istanbul
20:00 EEST	Podolski (yellow card) 8'; Sarıoğlu (yellow card) 14'; Sneijder (yellow card) 54'	Report	Tošić (yellow card) 14'; Şahan (yellow card) 32'; Marcelo (yellow card) 42'; Gómez 76'	Stadium: Türk Telekom Arena; Attendance: 26,189; Referee: Mete Kalkavan

15 May 2016 33	Beşiktaş	3–1	Osmanlıspor	Istanbul
19:00 EEST	Marcelo 21', 24'; Gómez 48'; Özyakup (yellow card) 72'	Report	Rusescu (yellow card) 55'; Webó 74'; Lawal (yellow card) 89'	Stadium: Vodafone Arena; Attendance: 38,421; Referee: Cüneyt Çakır

18 May 2016 34	Konyaspor	2–1	Beşiktaş	Konya
19:00 EEST	Traoré 21'; Holmén 22'; Turan (yellow card) 84'	Report	Sosa 19'; Arslan (yellow card) 51'; Tošić (yellow card) 87'	Stadium: Konya Büyükşehir Belediye Stadium; Attendance: 12,326; Referee: Ümit Öztürk

=== Turkish Cup ===
==== Group stage ====
Pos	Team	Pld	W	D	L	GF	GA	GD	Pts
1	Sivas Belediyespor	6	4	0	2	13	13	0	12
2	Beşiktaş	6	3	1	2	10	7	+3	10 (Note: Ranked by goal difference)
3	1461 Trabzon	6	3	1	2	15	4	+11	10
4	Kardemir Karabükspor	6	1	0	5	3	17	−14	3

Notes:

17 December 2015 1	Beşiktaş	3–0	Kardemir Karabükspor	Istanbul
18:30 EEST	Tosun 45', 67'; Frei 59'	Report	Adıcan (yellow card) 55'	Stadium: Atatürk Olympic Stadium; Attendance: 2,000; Referee: Volkan Bayarslan

24 December 2015 2	Sivas Belediyespor	0–2	Beşiktaş	Sivas
13:45 EEST	Mursal (red card) 14'	Report	Tosun 6'; Uysal (yellow card) 47'; Pektemek 57'; Milošević (red card) 75'	Stadium: Muhsin Yazıcıoğlu Stadium; Attendance: 2,200; Referee: Erkan Engin

10 January 2016 3	1461 Trabzon	1–1	Beşiktaş	Trabzon
18:30 EEST	Gür (yellow card) 25'; Alkurt (yellow card) 44'; Ak (yellow card) 50'; Şişman 65'	Report	Tosun (yellow card) 43'; Sosa 45'; Uysal (yellow card) 83'	Stadium: Hüseyin Avni Aker Stadium; Referee: Halil Umut Meler

14 January 2016 4	Beşiktaş	1–0	1461 Trabzon	Istanbul
20:30 EEST	Köybaşı (yellow card) 37'; Şahan (yellow card) 80'; Tosun 90+1'	Report		Stadium: Atatürk Olympic Stadium; Referee: Kutluhan Bilgiç

20 January 2016 5	Kardemir Karabükspor	2–0	Beşiktaş	Karabük
19:45 EEST	Çelik (yellow card) 29', (goal) 44'; Aydın 51'	Report	Frei (yellow card) 25'; Uysal (yellow card) 52'	Stadium: Dr. Necmettin Şeyhoğlu Stadium; Attendance: 2,000; Referee: Özkan Çeliker

28 January 2016 6	Beşiktaş	3–4	Sivas Belediyespor	Istanbul
20:15 EEST	Milošević (red card) 33'; Tosun 54' (pen.), 60'; Töre 65'; Sosa (yellow card) 90'	Report	Gökçe (yellow card) 27'; Akburç 33' (pen.); Han 50'; Yıldırım 79', 82'; Cömert (yellow card) 90+2'; Mursal (yellow card) 90+3'	Stadium: Atatürk Olympic Stadium; Attendance: 2,500; Referee: Murat Özcan

==== Round of 16 ====
31 January 2016 Round of 16	Bucaspor	0–2	Beşiktaş	İzmir
17:45 EEST	Çulcuoğlu (yellow card) 34'; Tamet (yellow card) 41'; Kanberoğlu (yellow card) 56'; Yıldırım (yellow card) 89'	Report	Köybaşı (yellow card) 2'; Özyakup (yellow card) 27', (goal) 72' (pen.); Yılmaz 61' (o.g.)	Stadium: Buca Arena; Attendance: 7,000; Referee: Abdulkadir Bitigen

==== Quarter-finals ====
10 February 2016 First leg	Beşiktaş	1–2	Konyaspor	Istanbul
21:15 EEST	Tosun 31'; Sosa (yellow card) 43'; Marcelo (red card) 63'	Report	Mbamba (yellow card) 44'; Bajić 65'; Fındıklı 79'; Rangelov (yellow card) 84'	Stadium: Atatürk Olympic Stadium; Attendance: 5,554; Referee: Tolga Özkalfa

3 March 2016 Second leg	Konyaspor	1–0	Beşiktaş	Konya
20:45 EEST	Meha 84', (yellow card) 69'; Holmén (yellow card) 89'	Report	Kurtuluş (yellow card) 30'; Özyakup (yellow card) 53'; Alexis (yellow card) 62'	Stadium: Torku Arena; Attendance: 41,981; Referee: Yaşar Kemal Uğurlu

=== UEFA Europa League ===
==== Group stage ====
Pos	Team	Pld	W	D	L	GF	GA	GD	Pts	Qualification	LMO	SPO	BES	SKE
1	(Russia) Lokomotiv Moscow	6	3	2	1	12	7	+5	11	Advance to knockout phase	—	2–4	1–1	2–0
2	(Portugal) Sporting CP	6	3	1	2	14	11	+3	10	Advance to knockout phase	1–3	—	3–1	5–1
3	(Turkey) Beşiktaş	6	2	3	1	7	6	+1	9		1–1	1–1	—	2–0
4	(Albania) Skënderbeu	6	1	0	5	4	13	−9	3		0–3	3–0	0–1	—

Source: Soccerway
Rules for classification: Group stage tiebreakers

17 September 2015 1	Skënderbeu Korçë (Albania)	0–1	(Turkey) Beşiktaş	Albania
22:05 FET (UTC+3)	Berisha (yellow card) 35'; Olayinka (yellow card) 45'	Report	Frei (yellow card) 24'; Sosa 28'; Gómez (yellow card) 90+5'	Stadium: Elbasan Arena; Attendance: 5,482; Referee: Tamás Bognár (Hungary)

1 October 2015 2	Beşiktaş (Turkey)	1–1	(Portugal) Sporting CP	Istanbul
20:00 FET (UTC+3)	Rhodolfo (yellow card) 25'; Gülüm (yellow card) 58'; Töre 61'	Report	Ruiz 16'; J. Silva (yellow card) 18'; Pereira (yellow card) 73'	Stadium: Atatürk Olympic Stadium; Attendance: 25,827; Referee: Paolo Tagliavento (Italy)

22 October 2015 3	Lokomotiv Moscow (Russia)	1–1	(Turkey) Beşiktaş	Russia
20:00 FET (UTC+3)	N'Dinga (yellow card) 44'; Maicon 54'; Ćorluka (red card) 69'; Guilherme (yellow card) 70'; Niasse (yellow card) 70'	Report	Köybaşı (yellow card) 62'; Gómez 64', (yellow card) 81'; Özyakup (yellow card) 70'	Stadium: Lokomotiv Stadium; Attendance: 19,124; Referee: Serge Gumienny (Belgium)

5 November 2015 4	Beşiktaş (Turkey)	1–1	(Russia) Lokomotiv Moscow	Istanbul
19:00 FET (UTC+3)	Gülüm (yellow card) 49'; Quaresma 58'	Report	Niasse (yellow card) 61', (goal) 76'	Stadium: Atatürk Olympic Stadium; Attendance: 24,690; Referee: Felix Zwayer (Germany)

26 November 2015 5	Beşiktaş (Turkey)	2–0	(Albania) Skënderbeu Korçë	Istanbul
20:00 FET (UTC+3)	Tosun 35', 78'	Report	Lilaj (yellow card) 41'; Vangjeli (yellow card) 63'	Stadium: Atatürk Olympic Stadium; Attendance: 11,155; Referee: Paweł Gil (Poland)

10 December 2015 6	Sporting CP (Portugal)	3–1	(Turkey) Beşiktaş	Portugal
22:05 FET (UTC+3)	Carvalho (yellow card) 18'; A. Silva (yellow card) 49'; Slimani 67'; Ruiz 72'; Gutiérrez 78', (yellow card) 78'; Oliveira (yellow card) 90+2'; João Mário (yellow card) 90+2'	Report	Quaresma (yellow card) 28'; Gómez 58'	Stadium: Estádio José Alvalade; Attendance: 28,211; Referee: Manuel Gräfe (Germany)

== Squad statistics ==
As of Match played 18 May 2016

=== Appearances and goals ===
No.	Pos	Nat	Player	Total		Süper Lig		Turkish Cup		Europa League	
No.	Pos	Nat	Player	Apps	Goals	Apps	Goals	Apps	Goals	Apps	Goals
2	DF	(Turkey) TUR	Serdar Kurtuluş	10	0	3	0	7	0	0	0
3	DF	(Turkey) TUR	İsmail Köybaşı	35	0	26+1	0	2	0	6	0
5	MF	(Argentina) ARG	José Sosa	41	9	30+1	7	5	1	5	1
6	DF	(Serbia) SRB	Duško Tošić	24	0	14+1	0	7	0	1+1	0
7	MF	(Turkey) TUR	Gökhan Töre	35	6	15+9	4	4+2	1	4+1	1
8	MF	(Turkey) TUR	Veli Kavlak	6	0	0+1	0	5	0	0	0
10	MF	(Turkey) TUR	Olcay Şahan	41	5	27+6	5	3+2	0	2+1	0
11	FW	(Turkey) TUR	Mustafa Pektemek	12	1	0+4	0	4+3	1	0+1	0
12	DF	(Spain) ESP	Alexis	12	1	9+1	1	2	0	0	0
13	MF	(Canada) CAN	Atiba Hutchinson	43	2	33+1	2	3	0	6	0
15	MF	(Turkey) TUR	Oğuzhan Özyakup	41	10	31	9	4+1	1	4+1	0
17	MF	(Portugal) POR	Ricardo Quaresma	37	5	23+3	4	3+2	0	4+2	1
18	MF	(Germany) GER	Tolgay Arslan	7	0	1+5	0	0+1	0	0	0
20	MF	(Turkey) TUR	Necip Uysal	43	1	9+20	1	7+1	0	3+3	0
21	MF	(Turkey) TUR	Kerim Frei	37	5	6+17	4	7+2	1	2+3	0
23	FW	(Turkey) TUR	Cenk Tosun	42	17	3+26	8	6+1	7	2+4	2
24	MF	(Turkey) TUR	Serkan Yavuz	1	0	0	0	0+1	0	0	0
25	MF	(Turkey) TUR	Devrim Taşkaya	1	0	0	0	0+1	0	0	0
27	GK	(Turkey) TUR	Günay Güvenç	7	0	1+1	0	5	0	0	0
29	GK	(Turkey) TUR	Tolga Zengin	38	0	30	0	2	0	6	0
30	DF	(Brazil) BRA	Marcelo	16	2	14	2	2	0	0	0
32	DF	(Germany) GER	Andreas Beck	42	0	31+1	0	2+2	0	6	0
33	FW	(Germany) GER	Mario Gómez	41	28	31+2	26	3	0	4+1	2
44	DF	(Brazil) BRA	Rhodolfo	27	1	18	1	3	0	6	0
50	FW	(Turkey) TUR	Hamza Küçükköylü	2	0	0	0	0+2	0	0	0
52	DF	(Turkey) TUR	Furkan Akbulut	1	0	0	0	1	0	0	0
67	MF	(Turkey) TUR	Muhammed Enes Durmuş	3	0	0	0	1+2	0	0	0
71	GK	(Ukraine) UKR	Denys Boyko	5	0	3	0	2	0	0	0
97	MF	(Turkey) TUR	Eslem Öztürk	1	0	0	0	0+1	0	0	0
Players away on loan:
4	DF	(Sweden) SWE	Alexander Milošević	4	0	1	0	3	0	0	0
19	DF	(Colombia) COL	Pedro Franco	3	0	0	0	3	0	0	0
Players who left Beşiktaş during the season:
22	DF	(Turkey) TUR	Ersan Gülüm	21	1	14	1	2	0	5	0
31	DF	(Brazil) BRA	Ramon	3	0	1	0	1+1	0	0	0

=== Goalscorers ===
Place	Position	Nation	Number	Name	Süper Lig	Turkish Cup	Europa League	Total
1	FW	(Germany)	33	Mario Gómez	26	0	2	28
2	FW	(Turkey)	23	Cenk Tosun	8	7	2	17
3	MF	(Turkey)	15	Oğuzhan Özyakup	9	1	0	10
4	MF	(Argentina)	5	José Sosa	7	1	1	9
5	MF	(Turkey)	7	Gökhan Töre	4	1	1	6
6	MF	(Turkey)	10	Olcay Şahan	5	0	0	5
6	MF	(Turkey)	21	Kerim Frei	4	1	0	5
6	MF	(Portugal)	17	Ricardo Quaresma	4	0	1	5
9	MF	(Canada)	13	Atiba Hutchinson	2	0	0	2
9	DF	(Brazil)	30	Marcelo	2	0	0	2
11	DF	(Brazil)	44	Rhodolfo	1	0	0	1
11	DF	(Spain)	12	Alexis	1	0	0	1
11	DF	(Turkey)	22	Ersan Gülüm	1	0	0	1
11	MF	(Turkey)	20	Necip Uysal	1	0	0	1
11	FW	(Turkey)	11	Mustafa Pektemek	0	1	0	1
				TOTALS	75	12	7	94

=== Disciplinary record ===
Number	Nation	Position	Name	Süper Lig		Turkish Cup		Europa League		Total	
Number	Nation	Position	Name	Yellow card	Red card	Yellow card	Red card	Yellow card	Red card	Yellow card	Red card
2	(Turkey)	DF	Serdar Kurtuluş	0	0	1	0	0	0	1	0
3	(Turkey)	DF	İsmail Köybaşı	3	0	2	0	1	0	6	0
4	(Sweden)	DF	Alexander Milošević	0	0	1	2	0	0	1	2
5	(Argentina)	MF	José Sosa	2	0	2	0	0	0	4	0
6	(Serbia)	DF	Duško Tošić	3	0	0	0	0	0	3	0
7	(Turkey)	MF	Gökhan Töre	2	0	0	0	0	0	2	0
10	(Turkey)	MF	Olcay Şahan	4	0	1	0	0	0	5	0
11	(Turkey)	FW	Mustafa Pektemek	1	0	0	0	0	0	1	0
12	(Spain)	DF	Alexis	2	0	1	0	0	0	3	0
15	(Turkey)	MF	Oğuzhan Özyakup	8	0	2	0	1	0	11	0
17	(Portugal)	MF	Ricardo Quaresma	13	2	0	0	1	0	14	2
18	(Germany)	MF	Tolgay Arslan	1	0	0	0	0	0	1	0
20	(Turkey)	MF	Necip Uysal	7	0	3	0	0	0	10	0
21	(Turkey)	MF	Kerim Frei	0	0	1	0	0	0	1	0
22	(Turkey)	DF	Ersan Gülüm	5	0	0	0	2	0	7	0
23	(Turkey)	FW	Cenk Tosun	2	0	1	0	0	0	3	0
29	(Turkey)	GK	Tolga Zengin	1	0	0	0	0	0	1	0
30	(Brazil)	DF	Marcelo	2	0	0	1	0	0	2	1
31	(Brazil)	DF	Ramon	1	0	0	0	0	0	1	0
32	(Germany)	DF	Andreas Beck	4	0	0	0	0	0	4	0
33	(Germany)	FW	Mario Gómez	3	0	0	0	1	0	4	0
44	(Brazil)	DF	Rhodolfo	3	0	0	0	1	0	4	0
			TOTALS	67	2	15	3	7	0	89	5
