= 2014–15 Beşiktaş J.K. season =

Beşiktaş
2014-15 season
- President: Fikret Orman
- Head coach: Slaven Bilić
- Stadium: Atatürk Olympic Stadium; Osmanlı Stadium; Başakşehir Fatih Terim Stadium; Konya Büyükşehir Belediye Stadium; Yusuf Ziya Öniş Stadium
- Süper Lig: 3rd
- Turkish Cup: Round of 16
- UEFA Champions League: Play-off round
- UEFA Europa League: Round of 16
- Top goalscorer: League: Demba Ba (18); All: Demba Ba (27)
- Highest home attendance: 60,344 (vs. Arsenal
Home colours	Away colours	Third colours

The 2014–15 season was the 111th year of Beşiktaş J.K. and their 57th consecutive year in the Süper Lig. They finished the season in third place in the Süper Lig, and were knocked out of the UEFA Europa League by Club Brugge at the round of 16 stage.

== Squad ==
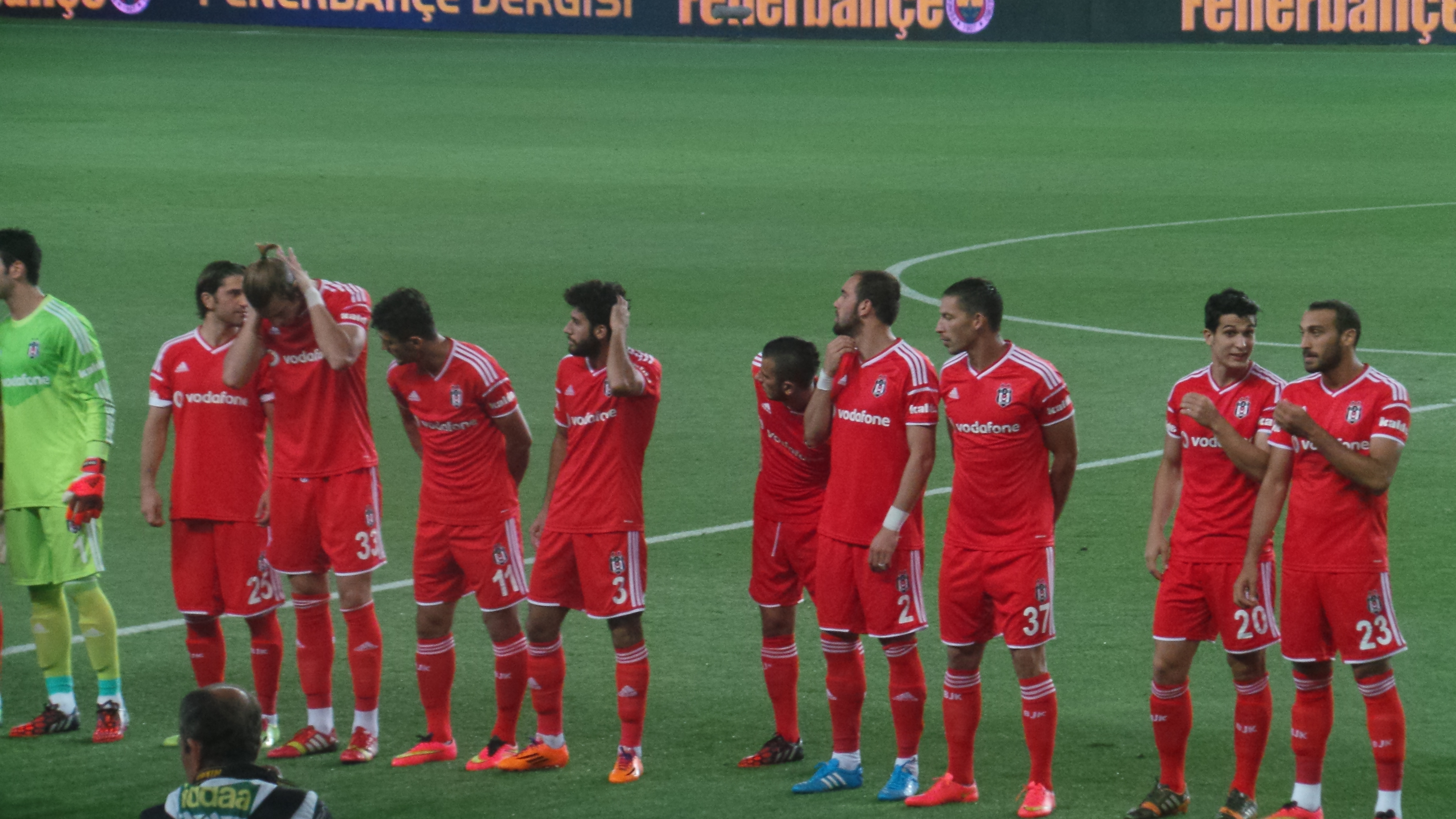
Beşiktaş players

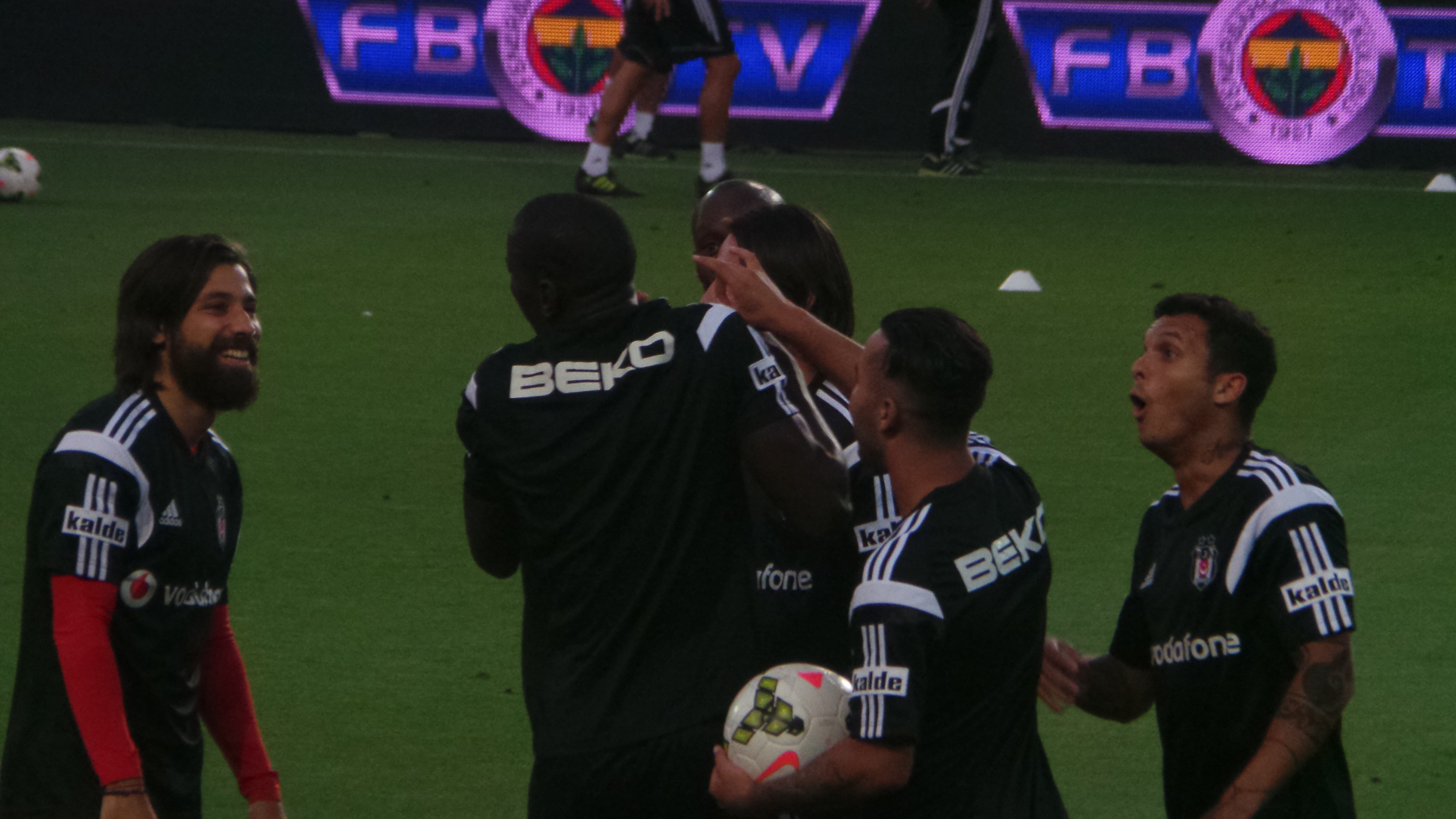
Olcay Şahan, Demba Ba, Karim Frei, Atiba Hutchinson and Ramon.

Note: Flags indicate national team as defined under FIFA eligibility rules; some limited exceptions apply. Players may hold more than one non-FIFA nationality.

No.	Pos.	Nation	Player
1	GK	TUR	Cenk Gönen
2	DF	TUR	Serdar Kurtuluş
3	DF	TUR	İsmail Köybaşı
4	DF	SWE	Alexander Milosevic
5	MF	ARG	José Sosa
6	DF	CZE	Tomáš Sivok
7	MF	TUR	Gökhan Töre
8	MF	AUT	Veli Kavlak
9	FW	SEN	Demba Ba
10	MF	TUR	Olcay Şahan
11	FW	TUR	Mustafa Pektemek
13	DF	CAN	Atiba Hutchinson
15	MF	TUR	Oğuzhan Özyakup
17	MF	TUR	Muhammed Durmuş
18	MF	GER	Tolgay Arslan
19	DF	COL	Pedro Franco
20	MF	TUR	Necip Uysal

No.	Pos.	Nation	Player
21	MF	TUR	Kerim Frei
22	DF	TUR	Ersan Gülüm
23	FW	TUR	Cenk Tosun
25	MF	TUR	Uğur Boral
27	GK	TUR	Günay Güvenç
31	DF	BRA	Ramon
33	DF	TUR	Atınç Nukan
41	GK	TUR	Enes Fidayeo
44	FW	GHA	Daniel Opare (on loan from Real Madrid)

== Competitions ==
=== Süper Lig ===
==== League table ====
Pos	Team	Pld	W	D	L	GF	GA	GD	Pts	Qualification or relegation
1	Galatasaray (C)	34	24	5	5	60	35	+25	77	Qualification for the Champions League group stage
2	Fenerbahçe	34	22	8	4	60	29	+31	74	Qualification for the Champions League third qualifying round
3	Beşiktaş	34	21	6	7	55	32	+23	69	Qualification for the Europa League group stage
4	Başakşehir	34	15	14	5	49	30	+19	59	Qualification for the Europa League third qualifying round
5	Trabzonspor	34	15	12	7	58	48	+10	57 (Note: Trabzonspor finished ahead of Bursaspor on head-to-head record: Trabzonspor–Bursaspor 1–0, Bursaspor–Trabzonspor 3–3.)	Qualification for the Europa League second qualifying round

Source: Süper Lig
Rules for classification: 1) points; 2) head-to-head points; 3) head-to-head goal difference; 4) goal difference; 5) number of goals scored (It is also decided that only criteria 1, 4 and 5 would be applied to establish the classification during the competition)
(C) Champions

==== Matches ====
30 August 2014 1	Mersin İdman Yurdu	0–1	Beşiktaş	Mersin
21:45	Sığırcı (yellow card) 52'; Şahin (yellow card) 90+3'		Köybaşı (yellow card) 18'; Tosun 43'; Uysal (yellow card) 57'	Stadium: Mersin Stadium; Attendance: 9,596; Referee: Tolga Özkalfa

15 September 2014 2	Beşiktaş	1–1	Çaykur Rizespor	Istanbul
20:00	Frei (yellow card) 77'; Şahan 81'; Kavlak (yellow card) 88'		Kweuke (yellow card) 13'; Karakaş (yellow card) 23'; Ovacıklı (yellow card) 28'; Korkmaz 48'; Söylemezgiller (yellow card) 90'; Kırıntılı (yellow card) 90+1'; Duruer (yellow card) 90+4'	Stadium: Atatürk Olympic Stadium; Attendance: 9,640; Referee: Hüseyin Göçek

22 September 2014 3	Bursaspor	0–1	Beşiktaş	Bursa
19:30	Tufan (yellow card) 55'; Civelli (yellow card) 89'; Fernandão (yellow card) 90'		Kavlak (yellow card) 21'; Köybaşı (yellow card) 49'; Kurtuluş (yellow card) 74'; Şahan 86'; Zengin (yellow card) 90'; Ba (yellow card) 90+8'	Stadium: Bursa Atatürk Stadium; Attendance: 19,675; Referee: Cüneyt Çakır

27 September 2014 4	Beşiktaş	1–1	Eskişehirspor	Istanbul
18:00	Şahan 21'; Ba (yellow card) 66'		Dabanlı (yellow card) 50', (goal) 71'; Funes Mori (yellow card) 60' (yellow-red card) 86'; Gücer (yellow card) 80'; Čaušić (yellow card) 88'; Boffin (yellow card) 90+3'	Stadium: Atatürk Olympic Stadium; Attendance: 8,500; Referee: Çağatay Şahan

5 October 2014 5	Balıkesirspor	0–1	Beşiktaş	Balıkesir
17:00	Jabbie (yellow card) 34'		Pektemek 57'; Gülüm (yellow card) 60'; Töre (yellow card) 65'; Özyakup (yellow card) 76'	Stadium: Balıkesir Atatürk Stadium; Attendance: 14,279; Referee: Deniz Çoban

19 October 2014 6	Beşiktaş	3–2	Sivasspor	Ankara
17:00	Ba 58', 65'; Şahan 79'		Da Costa 40'; Arslan 74'	Stadium: Osmanlı Stadium; Attendance: 12.000; Referee: Mete Kalkavan

27 October 2014 7	Kayseri Erciyesspor	3–2	Beşiktaş	Kayseri
19:00	Parlak (yellow card) 41'; Boye 54'; Ibričić (yellow card) 76'; Edinho 89'; Alkılıç 90+1'		Kavlak (yellow card) 39'; Töre (red card) 67'; Zengin (yellow card) 68'; Frei 70', 85'; Özyakup (yellow card) 72'	Stadium: Kayseri Kadir Has Stadium; Attendance: 4,000; Referee: İlker Meral

2 November 2014 8	Beşiktaş	0–2	Fenerbahçe	Istanbul
18:00	Şahan (yellow card) 32' (yellow-red card) 43'; Kavlak (yellow card) 45'; Özyakup (yellow card) 66'; Ba (yellow card) 80'; Sivok (yellow card) 90+5'		Emenike 3', (yellow card) 65'; Erkin (yellow card) 26'; Belözoğlu (yellow card) 45'; İrtegün (yellow card) 57'; Kuyt (yellow card) 79'; Sow 86'	Stadium: Atatürk Olympic Stadium; Attendance: 29,750; Referee: Bülent Yıldırım

9 November 2014 9	İstanbul Başakşehir	1–2	Beşiktaş	Istanbul
18:00	Epureanu 42'; Rotman (yellow card) 58'; Şentürk (yellow card) 75'; Şahin (yellow card) 89'; Öztorun (yellow card) 90'		Franco (yellow card) 9' (yellow-red card) 77'; Köybaşı (yellow card) 40' (yellow-red card) 90+2'; Ba 63'; Frei 75'; Gülüm (yellow card) 87'	Stadium: Başakşehir Fatih Terim Stadium; Attendance: 7,000; Referee: Cüneyt Çakır

23 November 2014 10	Beşiktaş	2–0	Kasımpaşa	Istanbul
18:00	Ramon (yellow card) 8'; Ba 28' (pen.), 45+1'		Şeras (yellow card) 9'; Eker (yellow card) 26'; Kula (yellow card) 26'; Torun (yellow card) 32'	Stadium: Başakşehir Fatih Terim Stadium; Attendance: 7,000; Referee: Özgür Yankaya

1 December 2014 11	Kardemir Karabükspor	1–2	Beşiktaş	Karabük
17:00	İncedemir (yellow card) 22'; Traoré (yellow card) 35'; Güngör (yellow card) 74'; Çağıran 83', (yellow card) 90+2'		Frei (yellow card) 39'; Ba 53', 55'; Kavlak (yellow card) 85'; Kurtuluş (yellow card) 88'; Pektemek (red card) 90+5'	Stadium: Dr. Necmettin Şeyhoğlu Stadium; Attendance: 2,600; Referee: Mustafa Kamil Abitoğlu

7 December 2014 12	Beşiktaş	3–0	Trabzonspor	Konya
18:00	Kavlak 5', (yellow card) 45'; Ba 21'; Töre (yellow card) 42'; Tosun 84'		Hurmacı (yellow card) 23'; Ekici (yellow card) 36'; Nizam (yellow card) 45'; Belkalem (yellow card) 45'; Erdoğan (yellow card) 90+3'	Stadium: Konya Büyükşehir Belediye Stadium; Attendance: 32,613; Referee: Mete Kalkavan

14 December 2014 13	Gaziantepspor	0–1	Beşiktaş	Gaziantep
18:00	Süme (yellow card) 38'; Chibuike (yellow card) 63'; Şen (yellow card) 78'		Kurtuluş (yellow card) 40'; Özyakup 64'; Nukan (yellow card) 80'; Sosa (yellow card) 84'; Uysal (yellow card) 88'; Zengin (yellow card) 90+5'	Stadium: Kamil Ocak Stadium; Attendance: 6,000; Referee: Çağatay Şahan

21 December 2014 14	Beşiktaş	3–1	Akhisar Belediyespor	Istanbul
18:00	Tosun 24'; Sosa 68'; Töre 90+4'		Yüce (yellow card) 52'; Zokora (yellow card) 56'; Kısa (yellow card) 67', (goal) 75'	Stadium: Başakşehir Fatih Terim Stadium; Attendance: 6,500; Referee: Süleyman Abay

28 December 2014 15	Konyaspor	1–2	Beşiktaş	Konya
18:00	Kabze 85' (pen.)		Töre 19'; Hutchinson (yellow card) 39' (yellow-red card) 83'; Köybaşı (yellow card) 50'; Sosa 58'	Stadium: Konya Büyükşehir Belediye Stadium; Attendance: 39,672; Referee: Halis Özkahya

4 January 2015 16	Beşiktaş	0–2	Galatasaray	Istanbul
18:00	Gülüm (yellow card) 20'; Kavlak (red card) 62'		Melo 50'; Altıntop (yellow card) 69'; Çolak (yellow card) 90'; Yılmaz 90+5'	Stadium: Atatürk Olympic Stadium; Attendance: 28,260; Referee: Cüneyt Çakır

26 January 2015 17	Gençlerbirliği	0–2	Beşiktaş	Ankara
19:00	Pehlivan (yellow card) 27'; Gosso (yellow card) 28'; Kaya (yellow card) 71'; Çalık (yellow card) 75'; Petrović (yellow card) 87'		Ba 69'; Şahan 77'; Uysal (yellow card) 83'; Franco (red card) 90'	Stadium: Ankara 19 Mayıs Stadium; Attendance: 9,000; Referee: Mustafa Kamil Abitoğlu

1 February 2015 18	Beşiktaş	2–1	Mersin İdman Yurdu	Ankara
13:00	Şahan 30'; Ba 65'		Taş (yellow card) 24'; Kaloğlu 61'	Stadium: Osmanlı Stadium; Attendance: 17,000; Referee: Mete Kalkavan

8 February 2015 19	Çaykur Rizespor	1–2	Beşiktaş	Rize
18:00	Oboabona (yellow card) 55'; Karakaş (red card) 61'; Kaya 62'; Altınay (red card) 65'; Obraniak (yellow card) 83'		Şahan (yellow card) 45'; Sosa 59'; Gülüm (yellow card) 68'; Ba 88' (pen.)	Stadium: Yeni Rize Şehir Stadium; Attendance: 5,250; Referee: Cüneyt Çakır

15 February 2015 20	Beşiktaş	3–2	Bursaspor	Istanbul
15:00	Ba 23', 90+3' (pen.); Ramon (yellow card) 45'; Kavlak (yellow card) 49'; Nukan (yellow card) 83'; Töre 87', (yellow card) 90+4'		Bakambu 12'; Aziz (yellow card) 40'; Fernandão (yellow card) 62'; Tufan 90', (yellow card) 90+4'; Özbayraklı (red card) 90+3'	Stadium: Atatürk Olympic Stadium; Attendance: 23,000; Referee: Mustafa Kamil Abitoğlu

22 February 2015 21	Eskişehirspor	1–0	Beşiktaş	Eskişehir
18:00	Kanak 18'; Diego Ângelo (yellow card) 20'		Frei (yellow card) 25'; Ramon (yellow card) 27'; Uysal (yellow card) 56'; Özyakup (yellow card) 70'; Arslan (yellow card) 78'	Stadium: Eskişehir Atatürk Stadium; Attendance: 8,000; Referee: Ali Palabıyık

1 March 2015 22	Beşiktaş	2–2	Balıkesirspor	Ankara
18:00	Ba 35' (pen.); Opare 53'; Franco (red card) 90+2'		Zec 50'; Vargas 83' (pen.)	Stadium: Osmanlı Stadium; Attendance: 10,000; Referee: Halis Özkahya

8 March 2015 23	Sivasspor	0–1	Beşiktaş	Sivas
13:00	Bekmezci (yellow card) 37'		Opare (yellow card) 33'; Hutchinson 44'; Gülüm (yellow card) 56'; Gönen (yellow card) 83'	Stadium: Sivas 4 Eylül Stadium; Attendance: 10,000; Referee: Bülent Yıldırım

15 March 2015 24	Beşiktaş	5–1	Kayseri Erciyesspor	Ankara
13:00	Töre 25'; Ba 35' (pen.); Gülüm (yellow card) 40'; Şahan 45', (yellow card) 55'; Pektemek 77'; Ramon 79'		Diakhaté (yellow card) 30'; Osmanpaşa (yellow card) 34'; Drenthe 48'; Mandjeck (yellow card) 53'	Stadium: Osmanlı Stadium; Attendance: 16,500; Referee: Cüneyt Çakır

22 March 2015 25	Fenerbahçe	1–0	Beşiktaş	Istanbul
19:00	Sow 90+1'; Diego (yellow card) 90+4'		Kavlak (yellow card) 59'; Ramon (yellow card) 88'	Stadium: Şükrü Saracoğlu Stadium; Attendance: 28,000; Referee: Fırat Aydınus

6 April 2015 26	Beşiktaş	0–0	İstanbul Başakşehir	Istanbul
19:00	Töre (yellow card) 80'		Erdem (yellow card) 89'	Stadium: Başakşehir Fatih Terim Stadium; Attendance: 5,000; Referee: Mete Kalkavan

18 April 2015 27	Kasımpaşa	1–5	Beşiktaş	Istanbul
18:00	Eker (yellow card) 38'; Torun 41'; Başdaş (red card) 53'; Büyük (red card) 77'		Pektemek 3'; Ba 38'; Ramon 50'; Şahan 75'; Sosa 86'	Stadium: Recep Tayyip Erdoğan Stadium; Attendance: 3,000; Referee: Mustafa Kamil Abitoğlu

27 April 2015 28	Beşiktaş	2–1	Kardemir Karabükspor	Ankara
19:00	Hutchinson 25'; Uysal (red card) 58'; Kurtuluş (yellow card) 67'; Tosun 90+5'		Candan (yellow card) 20'; Özcal (yellow card) 40'; Waterman (red card) 42'; Özgenç (yellow card) 60'; Akça (yellow card) 70'; Çağıran 79'	Stadium: Osmanlı Stadium; Attendance: 14,000; Referee: Bülent Yıldırım

3 May 2015 29	Trabzonspor	0–2	Beşiktaş	Trabzon
18:00	Demirok (yellow card) 47'; Erdoğan (yellow card) 78'		Ba 58'; Ramon (yellow card) 81'; Güvenç (yellow card) 87'; Pektemek 90+4'	Stadium: Hüseyin Avni Aker Stadium; Attendance: 16,997; Referee: Cüneyt Çakır

10 May 2015 30	Beşiktaş	1–1	Gaziantepspor	Ankara
18:00	Sosa 7'; Kurtuluş (yellow card) 22'; Sivok (yellow card) 37'; Tosun (yellow card) 83'; Töre (yellow card) 90+5'		Chibuike 41', (yellow card) 56' (yellow-red card) 82'; Vranješ (yellow card) 51'; Durak (yellow card) 60'; Arokoyo (yellow card) 71'; Türk (yellow card) 73'; Camara (yellow card) 77'; Birniçan (yellow card) 90+2'	Stadium: Osmanlı Stadium; Referee: Tolga Özkalfa

14 May 2015 31	Akhisar Belediyespor	1–1	Beşiktaş	Manisa
18:45	Akyüz 14'; Keleş (yellow card) 32'; LuaLua (yellow card) 38'; Scapolan (yellow card) 44'; Kısa (yellow card) 66'; Vural (yellow card) 87'		Gülüm (yellow card) 3'; Sosa (yellow card) 44'; Ba 54'; Arslan (yellow card) 60'; Ramon (yellow card) 80'	Stadium: Manisa 19 Mayıs Stadium; Attendance: 6,000; Referee: Bülent Yıldırım

18 May 2015 32	Beşiktaş	0–1	Konyaspor	Ankara
19:00	Opare (yellow card) 60'		Torje (yellow card) 71', (goal) 80'	Stadium: Osmanlı Stadium; Attendance: 4,500; Referee: Mustafa Kamil Abitoğlu

24 May 2015 33	Galatasaray	2–0	Beşiktaş	Istanbul
19:00	Öztekin 11', (yellow card) 78'; Adın (yellow card) 50'; Melo (yellow card) 59'; Sneijder 80'		Ba (yellow card) 33'; Sosa (yellow card) 78'	Stadium: Türk Telekom Stadium; Attendance: 47,310; Referee: Hüseyin Göcek

29 May 2015 34	Beşiktaş	2–1	Gençlerbirliği	Ankara
19:00	Tosun 42'; Nukan (yellow card) 71'; Özyakup 83'		Bülbül (yellow card) 38', (goal) 90'; El Kabir (yellow card) 88'	Stadium: Osmanlı Stadium; Attendance: 1,200; Referee: Yunus Yıldırım

=== Turkish Cup ===
After finishing in the top four of the previous season's Süper Lig, Beşiktaş qualified for the group stages. Beşiktaş was placed in Group F, along with Adana Demirspor, Çaykur Rizespor and Sarıyer. Beşiktaş finished second.

=== Group stage ===
Pos	Team	Pld	W	D	L	GF	GA	GD	Pts
1	Çaykur Rizespor	6	4	2	0	7	2	+5	14
2	Beşiktaş	6	3	1	2	12	5	+7	10
3	Adana Demirspor	6	2	1	3	8	11	−3	7
4	Sarıyer	6	1	0	5	4	13	−9	3

3 December 2014	Sarıyer	0–4	Beşiktaş	Istanbul
12:45				Stadium: Yusuf Ziya Öniş Stadium; Attendance: 4,500

18 December 2014	Beşiktaş	0–1	Çaykur Rizespor	Istanbul
19:30				Stadium: Atatürk Olympic Stadium; Attendance: 1,000

24 December 2014	Beşiktaş	1–2	Adana Demirspor	Istanbul
13:00				Stadium: Yusuf Ziya Öniş Stadium; Attendance: 4,500

21 January 2015	Adana Demirspor	1–4	Beşiktaş	Adana
19:30				Stadium: Adana 5 Ocak Stadium; Attendance: 12,500

29 January 2015	Beşiktaş	3–1	Sarıyer	Istanbul
19:30				Stadium: Atatürk Olympic Stadium; Attendance: 1,000

5 February 2015	Çaykur Rizespor	0–0	Beşiktaş	Rize
19:30				Stadium: Yeni Rize Şehir Stadium; Attendance: 4,000

=== Round of 16 ===
11 February 2015	Kayserispor	1–0	Beşiktaş	Kayseri
17:00				Stadium: Kayseri Kadir Has Stadium; Attendance: 15,500

=== UEFA Champions League ===
==== Third qualifying round ====
30 July 2014 First leg	Feyenoord (Netherlands)	1–2	(Turkey) Beşiktaş	Rotterdam, Netherlands
	Te Vrede 90+5' (pen.)	Report	Pektemek 13'; Frei 71'	Stadium: De Kuip; Attendance: 50,000; Referee: Luca Banti (Italy)

6 August 2014 Second leg	Beşiktaş (Turkey)	3–1 (5–2 agg.)	(Netherlands) Feyenoord	Istanbul, Turkey
	Ba 28', 80', 86'	Report	Manu 74'	Stadium: Atatürk Olympic Stadium; Attendance: 45,000; Referee: Felix Zwayer (Germany)

==== Play-off round ====
19 August 2014 First leg	Beşiktaş (Turkey)	0–0	(England) Arsenal	Istanbul, Turkey
19:45 BST	Motta (yellow card) 53'; Özyakup (yellow card) 77'	Report	Ramsey (yellow card) 54' (yellow-red card) 80'; Flamini (yellow card) 56'; Monreal (yellow card) 66'	Stadium: Atatürk Olympic Stadium; Attendance: 60,976; Referee: Milorad Mažić (Serbia)

27 August 2014 Second leg	Arsenal (England)	1–0 (1–0 agg.)	(Turkey) Beşiktaş	London, England
19:45 BST	Sánchez 45+1'; Debuchy (yellow card) 14' (yellow-red card) 75'; Chambers (yellow card) 77'; Szczęsny (yellow card) 86'	Report	Kavlak (yellow card) 23'; Özyakup (yellow card) 32'; Franco (yellow card) 59'; Hutchinson (yellow card) 79'; Uysal (yellow card) 85'; Töre (yellow card) 90'	Stadium: Emirates Stadium; Attendance: 59,946; Referee: Pedro Proença (Portugal)

=== UEFA Europa League ===
==== Group stage ====
Pos	Team	Pld	W	D	L	GF	GA	GD	Pts	Qualification	BES	TOT	AT	PAR
1	(Turkey) Beşiktaş	6	3	3	0	11	5	+6	12	Advance to knockout phase	—	1–0	1–1	2–1
2	(England) Tottenham Hotspur	6	3	2	1	9	4	+5	11	Advance to knockout phase	1–1	—	5–1	1–0
3	(Greece) Asteras Tripolis	6	1	3	2	7	10	−3	6		2–2	1–2	—	2–0
4	(Serbia) Partizan	6	0	2	4	1	9	−8	2		0–4	0–0	0–0	—

Source: Soccerway
Rules for classification: Group stage tiebreakers

18 September 2014 1	Beşiktaş (Turkey)	1–1	(Greece) Asteras Tripolis	Istanbul, Turkey
19:00	Töre 33'	Report	Parra 88'	Stadium: Atatürk Olympic Stadium; Attendance: 7,760; Referee: Miroslav Zelinka (Czech Republic)

2 October 2014 2	Tottenham Hotspur (England)	1–1	(Turkey) Beşiktaş	London, England
21:05	Kane 27'	Report	Ba 89' (pen.)	Stadium: White Hart Lane; Attendance: 24,300; Referee: Manuel Gräfe (Germany)

23 October 2014 3	Partizan (Serbia)	0–4	(Turkey) Beşiktaş	Belgrade, Serbia
21:05		Report	Kavlak 18'; Ba 45'; Özyakup 52'; Töre 54'	Stadium: Partizan Stadium; Attendance: 17,500; Referee: Paolo Mazzoleni (Italy)

6 November 2014 4	Beşiktaş (Turkey)	2–1	(Serbia) Partizan	Istanbul, Turkey
19:00	Ba 57' (pen.), 62'	Report	Marković 78'	Stadium: Atatürk Olympic Stadium; Attendance: 12,000; Referee: Alexandru Tudor (Romania)

27 November 2014 5	Asteras Tripolis (Greece)	2–2	(Turkey) Beşiktaş	Tripoli, Greece
21:05	Barrales 72'; Parra 83'	Report	Ba 15'; Töre 61' (pen.)	Stadium: Theodoros Kolokotronis Stadium; Attendance: 2,858; Referee: Jorge Sousa (Portugal)

11 December 2014 6	Beşiktaş (Turkey)	1–0	(England) Tottenham Hotspur	Istanbul, Turkey
19:00	Tosun 59'	Report		Stadium: Atatürk Olympic Stadium; Attendance: 19,511; Referee: Stefan Johannesson (Sweden)

==== Knockout phase ====
===== Round of 32 =====
19 February 2015 First leg	Liverpool (England)	1–0	(Turkey) Beşiktaş	Liverpool, England
21:05	Lovren (yellow card) 68'; Balotelli 85' (pen.)	Report	Gülüm (yellow card) 45'; Kurtuluş (yellow card) 77'; Motta (yellow card) 84'; Franco (yellow card) 90+3'	Stadium: Anfield; Attendance: 43,353; Referee: Szymon Marciniak (Poland)

26 February 2015 Second leg	Beşiktaş (Turkey)	1–0 (a.e.t.) (1–1 agg.) (5–4 p)	(England) Liverpool	Istanbul, Turkey
19:00	Arslan 72'	Report	Balotelli (yellow card) 11'; Can (yellow card) 103'	Stadium: Atatürk Olympic Stadium; Attendance: 63,324; Referee: Damir Skomina (Slovenia)
	Penalties
	Ba (penalty scored); Töre (penalty scored); Kavlak (penalty scored); Hutchinson (penalty scored); Arslan (penalty scored)		(penalty scored) Lambert; (penalty scored) Lallana; (penalty scored) Can; (penalty scored) Allen; (penalty missed) Lovren

===== Round of 16 =====
12 March 2015 First leg	Club Brugge (Belgium)	2–1	(Turkey) Beşiktaş	Bruges, Belgium
19:00	De Sutter (yellow card) 16', (goal) 62'; Refaelov 79' (pen.); Oulare (yellow card) 85'	Report	Arslan (yellow card) 39'; Uysal (yellow card) 42'; Töre 46'; Gönen (yellow card) 69'	Stadium: Jan Breydel Stadium; Attendance: 12,977; Referee: Craig Thomson (Scotland)

19 March 2015 Second leg	Beşiktaş (Turkey)	1–3 (2–5 agg.)	(Belgium) Club Brugge	Istanbul, Turkey
21:05	Opare (yellow card) 36'; Motta 48'; Kavlak (yellow card) 83'; Şahan (red card) 90+2'	Report	Izquierdo (yellow card) 32'; De Sutter 61'; Meunier (yellow card) 63'; Bolingoli-Mbombo 80', 90'	Stadium: Atatürk Olympic Stadium; Attendance: 65,110; Referee: Sergei Karasev (Russia)
