= Yüce =

Yüce is a Turkish surname. Notable people with the surname include:

- İhsan Yüce (1929–1991), Turkish actor, scenarist, and director
- Merter Yüce (born 1985), Turkish football player
- Orhun Yüce (born 1998), Turkish curler
- Osman Yüce (1929–1965), Turkish alpine skier
- Sedat Yüce (born 1976), Turkish singer
- Tevfik Yüce (1927–2005), Turkish wrestler
