= Osamu Henry Iyoha =

Japanese footballer

Osamu Henry Iyoha イヨハ 理 ヘンリー
Personal information
- Full name: Osamu Henry Iyoha
- Date of birth: 23 June 1998 (age 28)
- Place of birth: Kōnan, Aichi, Japan
- Height: 1.81 m (5 ft 11 1/2 in)
- Positions: Centre back; left back

Team information
- Current team: RB Omiya Ardija (on loan from Sanfrecce Hiroshima)
- Number: 13

Youth career
- –2013: FC Fervor Aichi
- 2014–2016: Sanfrecce Hiroshima

Senior career*
Years	Team	Apps	(Gls)
2017–	Sanfrecce Hiroshima	3	(0)
2018–2020	→ FC Gifu (loan)	41	(1)
2021	→ Kagoshima United (loan)	12	(0)
2022	→ Roasso Kumamoto (loan)	38	(2)
2023	→ Kyoto Sanga (loan)	18	(0)
2025–	→ RB Omiya Ardija (loan)	18	(1)
- * Club domestic league appearances and goals as of 21:11, 10 June 2026 (UTC)

Osamu Henry Iyoha (イヨハ 理 ヘンリー, Iyoha Osamu Henry; born 23 June 1998) is a Japanese professional footballer who plays as a centre back or a left-back for J2 League club RB Omiya Ardija, on loan from J1 League club Sanfrecce Hiroshima.

== Career ==
In 2016, when he was in his third year of high school, he was the captain of the Sanfrecce Hiroshima Youth and played an active role as a central player in the three-back team.

While contributing to winning the Prince Takamado Trophy U-18 Soccer League Premier League WEST, on the other hand, he spent a lot of time practicing with the top team as a class 2 registered player (wearing uniform number 38 during the class 2 registration period). On September 1, it was decided that they would be officially promoted to the top team of Sanfrecce Hiroshima from the next season. Osamu Henry Iyoha joined J1 League club Sanfrecce Hiroshima in 2017. On June 21, he debuted in Emperor's Cup (v Kagoshima United FC).

In 2018, Iyoha was sent on a long-term loan to FC Gifu until 2020. He made 42 appearances for the club during his three seasons. In October 2020, Iyoha scored his professional goal in a 4–0 league victory over Iwate Grulla Morioka.

For the 2021 season, Iyoha was loaned out to Kagoshima United, where he made 12 appearances in the J3 League.

In 2022, Iyoha loaned was once sent out on loan, this time to newly promoted J2 League club Roasso Kumamoto. Here he became a regular in the side and made 39 appearances across all competitions, scoring two goals.

In December 2022, Iyoha joined J1 League club Kyoto Sanga on loan for the 2023 season.

Iyoha returned to Sanfrecce Hiroshima for the 2024 season.

== Personal life ==
Iyoha was born in Japan to a Nigerian father and Japanese mother.

== Career statistics ==
As of match played 30 May 2026

Appearances and goals by club, season and competition
Club	Season	League			Emperor's Cup		J. League Cup		Other		Total	
Club	Season	Division	Apps	Goals	Apps	Goals	Apps	Goals	Apps	Goals	Apps	Goals
Sanfrecce Hiroshima	2017	J1 League	0	0	1	0	0	0	—		1	0
Sanfrecce Hiroshima	2024	J1 League	3	0	0	0	1	0	2 (Note: Appearances in AFC Champions League Two)	1	6	1
Sanfrecce Hiroshima	Total		3	0	1	0	1	0	2	1	7	1
FC Gifu (loan)	2018	J2 League	11	0	0	0	—		—		11	0
FC Gifu (loan)	2019	J2 League	6	0	1	0	—		—		7	0
FC Gifu (loan)	2020	J3 League	24	1	0	0	—		—		24	1
FC Gifu (loan)	Total		41	1	1	0	0	0	0	0	42	1
Kagoshima United (loan)	2021	J3 League	12	0	0	0	—		—		12	0
Roasso Kumamoto (loan)	2022	J2 League	38	2	1	0	—		3 (Note: Appearances in J2 League promotion play-offs)	2	42	4
Kyoto Sanga (loan)	2023	J1 League	18	0	1	1	4	0	—		23	1
RB Omiya Ardija (loan)	2025	J2 League	11	1	—		—		0	0	11	1
RB Omiya Ardija (loan)	2026	J2/J3	7	0	—		—		—		7	0
RB Omiya Ardija (loan)	Total		18	1	—		—		0	0	18	1
Career total			130	4	4	1	5	0	5	3	144	8
