= Pedro Franco =

Colombian footballer (born 1991)

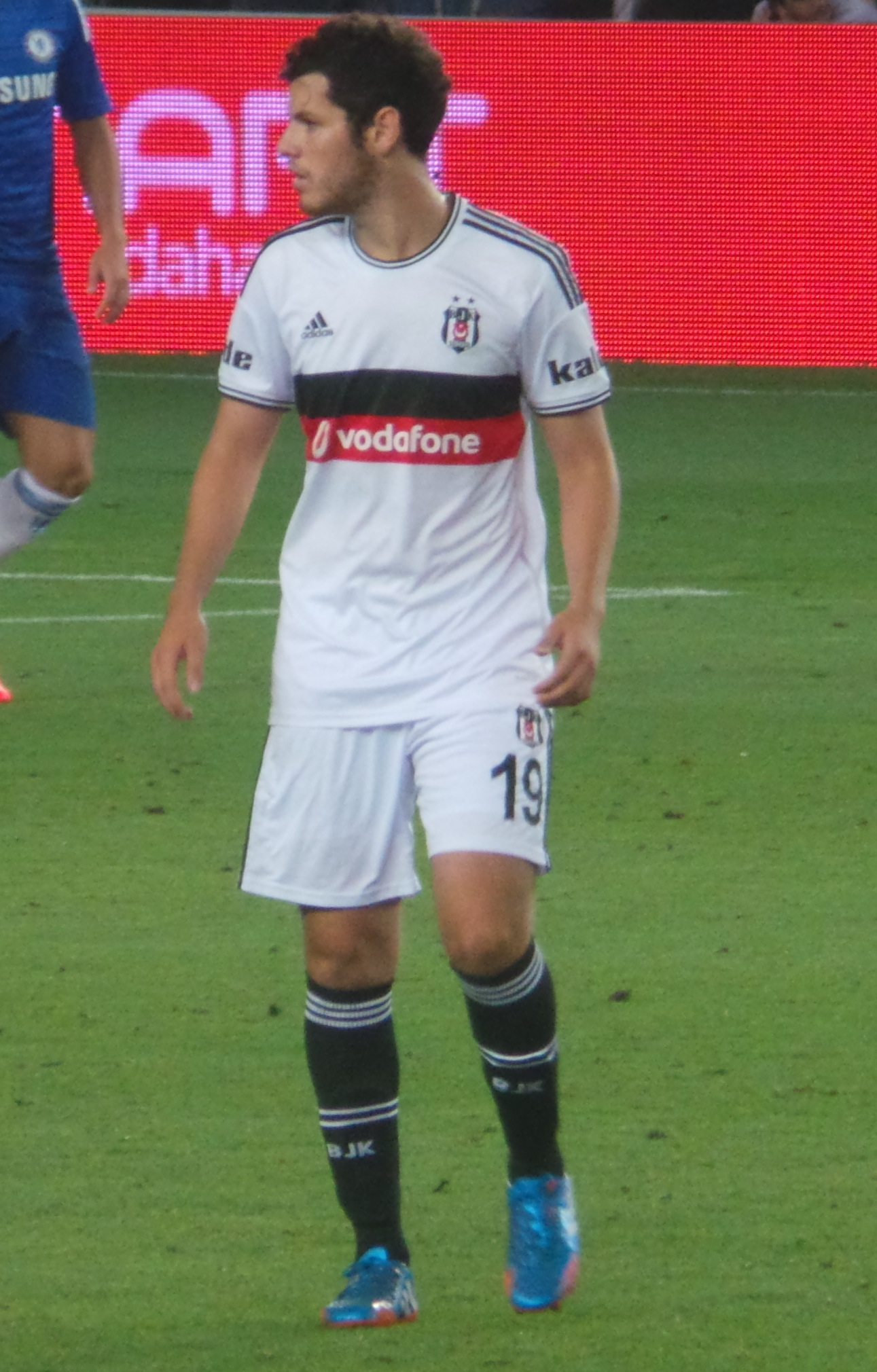
- Franco playing for Beşiktaş in 2014

Personal information
- Full name: Pedro Camilo Franco Ulloa
- Date of birth: 23 April 1991 (age 35)
- Place of birth: Bogotá, Colombia
- Height: 1.83 m (6 ft 0 in)
- Position: Centre back

Team information
- Current team: Alianza
- Number: 5

Youth career
- 2001–2009: Millonarios

Senior career*
Years	Team	Apps	(Gls)
2009–2013	Millonarios	103	(7)
2013–2018	Beşiktaş	39	(1)
2016	→ San Lorenzo (loan)	3	(0)
2016–2017	→ Millonarios (loan)	35	(1)
2017–2018	→ Boluspor (loan)	10	(0)
2018–2019	América de Cali	40	(3)
2021	Blooming	4	(0)
2021–2022	Fortaleza CEIF	55	(1)
2023–	Alianza Valledupar	105	(3)

International career^{‡}
2009–2011	Colombia U20	14	(2)
2014–2015	Colombia	5	(0)
- * Club domestic league appearances and goals as of 12 December 2025 ‡ National team caps and goals as of 6 June 2015

Pedro Camilo Franco Ulloa (Spanish pronunciation: [ˈpeðɾo ˈfɾaŋko]; born 23 April 1991) is a Colombian professional footballer who plays as a centre back for Alianza F.C. (Colombia). He is frequently used as a playmaker from the defensive end and also as a defensive midfielder if needed. He is mostly known for his anticipation of the ball, ball technique and passing.

== Club career ==
=== Millonarios ===
Franco is a youth product of Colombian team Millonarios. After making his debut in 2009 with the senior squad, he became a key defender for the Colombian capital's team. He was part of the team that won the 2012 Categoría Primera A season leading to the final on penalties, where he scored one of the penalties in victory.

In April 2013, Franco reached a remarkable 100th club career appearance.

=== Beşiktaş ===
In June 2013, Franco signed a 5-year deal with Turkish giants Beşiktaş for a fee of €2.4 million. However, he did not play in any games for the Turkish side for several months, leading many to believe that would leave in the 2014 January transfer window. With no appearances in the league, Franco requested more playing time in order for potential spot in 2014 World Cup with Colombia. Beşiktaş coach, Slaven Bilić, promised to help him also guaranteeing that Franco would be included in Colombia's final list for the World Cup.

After months of struggling to earn his debut, Franco finally made his official first appearance for the club in 2014 after being subbed in against Trabzonspor in the 66th minute. The game ended 1-1. On February 11, 2014, he scored his first goal for Beşiktaş in a 3–0 away win against Kasımpaşa.

==== San Lorenzo ====
On 15 January 2016, Franco joined San Lorenzo on a 6-month loan.

==== Return to Millonarios ====
After a mostly unsuccessful loan spell at San Lorenzo, on 5 July 2016 Franco returned to his hometown team Millonarios on a 1-year loan.

==== Boluspor ====
On 7 September 2017, signed with Turkish club Boluspor, on loan for the rest of the season.

=== América de Cali ===
On 9 July 2018, Franco returned to Colombia, signing with América de Cali.

=== Blooming ===
On 13 January 2021, Franco signed with Bolivian side Blooming, after being released by América de Cali in June 2020.

=== Fortaleza CEIF ===
On 14 August 2021, Fortaleza C.E.I.F. announced the signing of Franco, marking his return to Colombia after a short spell in Bolivia.

=== Alianza Petrolera ===
On 2 December 2022, Franco signed for Colombian side Alianza Petrolera.

== International career ==
Franco played with the U-20 national team between 2009 and 2011. He won the 2011 edition of the Toulon Tournament where he was selected as the tournament's best defender, and played in the 2011 South American Youth Championship. He also represented Colombia during the 2011 FIFA U-20 World Cup in which his home nation hosted.

3 years after last playing for Colombia's youth national team, he was called up to the senior squad for the friendlies against Canada and El Salvador. He debuted in a 3–0 win over El Salvador on 10 October, playing a full 90 minutes.

== Career statistics ==
=== Club ===
As of match played 25 July 2023

Appearances and goals by club, season and competition
Club	Season	League			Cup		Continental		Other		Total	
Club	Season	Division	Apps	Goals	Apps	Goals	Apps	Goals	Apps	Goals	Apps	Goals
Millonarios	2009	Colombian Primera A	17	1	0	0	0	0	0	0	17	1
Millonarios	2010	Colombian Primera A	15	0	0	0	0	0	0	0	15	0
Millonarios	2011	Colombian Primera A	22	2	6	1	0	0	0	0	28	3
Millonarios	2012	Colombian Primera A	30	2	6	2	10	0	0	0	46	4
Millonarios	2013	Colombian Primera A	19	2	0	0	6	1	2	1	27	4
Millonarios	Total		103	7	12	3	16	1	2	1	133	12
Beşiktaş	2013–14	Turkish Süper Lig	18	1	1	0	0	0	0	0	19	1
Beşiktaş	2014–15	Turkish Süper Lig	21	0	3	0	13	0	0	0	37	0
Beşiktaş	2015–16	Turkish Süper Lig	0	0	3	0	0	0	0	0	3	0
Beşiktaş	Total		39	1	7	0	13	0	0	0	59	1
San Lorenzo (loan)	2016	Argentine Primera División	3	0	0	0	1	0	0	0	4	0
Millonarios (loan)	2016	Colombian Primera A	11	1	2	0	0	0	0	0	13	1
Millonarios (loan)	2017	Colombian Primera A	24	0	0	0	2	0	0	0	26	0
Millonarios (loan)	Total		35	1	2	0	2	0	0	0	39	1
Boluspor (loan)	2017–18	Turkish 1.Lig	10	0	0	0	0	0	0	0	10	0
América de Cali	2018	Colombian Primera A	17	0	1	0	0	0	0	0	18	0
América de Cali	2019	Colombian Primera A	21	2	7	2	0	0	0	0	30	2
América de Cali	2020	Colombian Primera A	2	1	0	0	1	0	0	0	3	1
América de Cali	Total		40	3	8	2	1	0	0	0	51	3
Blooming	2021	Bolivian Primera División	4	0	0	0	0	0	0	0	4	0
Fortaleza C.E.I.F.	2021	Colombian Primera B	16	0	0	0	0	0	0	0	16	0
Fortaleza C.E.I.F.	2022	Colombian Primera B	39	1	7	0	0	0	0	0	46	1
Fortaleza C.E.I.F.	Total		55	1	7	0	0	0	0	0	62	1
Alianza Petrolera	2023	Colombian Primera A	26	1	0	0	0	0	0	0	25	1
Career total			315	14	36	5	33	1	2	1	386	21

=== International ===
As of 6 June 2015

Colombia senior team
Year	Apps	Goal
2014	2	0
2015	3	0
Total	5	0

== Honours ==
=== Club ===
Millonarios F.C.

- Categoría Primera A: 2012-II
- Copa Colombia: 2011

Beşiktaş J.K.

- Süper Lig: 2015–16

América de Cali

- Categoría Primera A: 2019-II
- Categoría Primera A: 2020

=== International ===
Colombia U20

- Toulon Tournament: 2011

=== Individual ===
- South American Youth Football Championship Best Player: 2011
