= 2024 Sanfrecce Hiroshima season =

Sanfrecce Hiroshima
2024 season
- Manager: Michael Skibbe
- Stadium: Edion Peace Wing Hiroshima
- J1 League: 2nd
- Emperor's Cup: Quarter-finals
- J.League Cup: Quarter-finals
- AFC Champions League Two: Round of 16
- Top goalscorer: League: Yuki Ohashi (10); All: Yuki Ohashi
- Biggest win: Sanfrecce Hiroshima 11–2 Baleine Shimonoseki
- Biggest defeat: Urawa Reds 3–0 Sanfrecce Hiroshima

The 2024 season was the 89th season in the history of Sanfrecce Hiroshima and their 16th consecutive season in the J1 League. In addition to the domestic league, the club competed in the Emperor's Cup, the J.League Cup, and the AFC Champions League Two.

== Transfers ==
=== In ===
Pos.	Player	Transferred from	Fee	Date	Source
MF	(Germany) Tolgay Arslan	(Australia) Melbourne City	Undisclosed	21 July 2024	
MF	(Japan) Hayao Kawabe	(Belgium) Standard Liège	€3.5M	2 August 2024	
FW	(Portugal) Gonçalo Paciência	(Spain) Celta Vigo	Undisclosed	2 September 2024	

== Competitions ==
=== Overall record ===
Competition	First match	Last match	Starting round	Final position	Record							
Competition	First match	Last match	Starting round	Final position	Pld	W	D	L	GF	GA	GD	Win %
J1 League	23 February 2024	8 December 2024	Matchday 1	2nd	38	19	11	8	72	43	+29	50.00
Emperor's Cup	12 June 2024	11 September 2024	Second round	Quarter-finals	4	3	0	1	18	4	+14	75.00
J.League Cup	24 April 2024	8 September 2024	Round 2	Quarter-finals	6	5	0	1	16	6	+10	83.33
AFC Champions League Two	19 September 2024	5 December 2024	Group stage		6	5	1	0	14	5	+9	83.33
Total					54	32	12	10	120	58	+62	59.26

Source: Competitions

=== J1 League ===
==== League table ====
Pos	Team	Pld	W	D	L	GF	GA	GD	Pts	Qualification or relegation
1	Vissel Kobe (C)	38	21	9	8	61	36	+25	72	Qualification for the AFC Champions League Elite league stage (Note: Since the winners of the 2024 Emperor's Cup, Vissel Kobe, had already qualified for the Champions League Elite, the spot given to the Emperor's Cup winners (Champions League Elite) was passed to the third-placed team. Consequently, the spot given to the third-placed team (Champions League Two) was passed to the fourth-placed team.)
2	Sanfrecce Hiroshima	38	19	11	8	72	43	+29	68	Qualification for the AFC Champions League Elite league stage
3	Machida Zelvia	38	19	9	10	54	34	+20	66	Qualification for the AFC Champions League Elite league stage
4	Gamba Osaka	38	18	12	8	49	35	+14	66	Qualification for the AFC Champions League Two group stage
5	Kashima Antlers	38	18	11	9	60	41	+19	65	

Source: J1 League, J.League Data Site
Rules for classification: 1) Points; 2) Goal difference; 3) Goals scored; 4) Head-to-head points; 5) Head-to-head goal difference; 6) Head-to-head goals scored; 7) Fewer disciplinary points.
(C) Champions

==== Results summary ====
Overall								Home						Away					
Pld	W	D	L	GF	GA	GD	Pts	W	D	L	GF	GA	GD	W	D	L	GF	GA	GD
38	19	11	8	72	43	+29	68	12	3	4	43	20	+23	7	8	4	29	23	+6

==== Results by round ====
Round	1	2	3	4	5	6	7	8	9	10	11	12	13	14	15	16	17	18	19	20	21	22	23	24	25	26	27	28	29	30	31	32	33	34	35	36	37	38
Ground	H	A	H	A	H	A	H	A	A	H	A	H	A	H	A	A	H	H	A	H	A	H	H	A	A	H	A	H	H	A	H	H	A	A	H	A	H	A
Result	W	D	W	D	D	W	W	D	D	D	D	L	L	L	W	D	W	W	W	D	D	L	W	W	W	W	W	W	W	D	W	W	W	L	L	L	W	L
Position	2	2	1	3	5	2	2	2	3	3	4	6	9	10	10	8	5	5	5	5	7	7	5	5	4	3	2	2	1	2	1	1	1	1	2	2	2	2

A = Away; H = Home; W = Win; D = Draw; L = Loss

==== Matches ====
23 February 2024 1	Sanfrecce Hiroshima	2–0	Urawa Red Diamonds

2 March 2024 2	FC Tokyo	1–1	Sanfrecce Hiroshima

9 March 2024 3	Sanfrecce Hiroshima	4–0	Sagan Tosu

16 March 2024 4	Vissel Kobe	0–0	Sanfrecce Hiroshima

30 March 2024 5	Sanfrecce Hiroshima	1–1	Gamba Osaka

3 April 2024 6	Machida Zelvia	1–2	Sanfrecce Hiroshima

7 April 2024 7	Sanfrecce Hiroshima	2–0	Shonan Bellmare

13 April 2024 8	Avispa Fukuoka	1–1	Sanfrecce Hiroshima

20 April 2024 9	Hokkaido Consadole Sapporo	1–1	Sanfrecce Hiroshima

28 April 2024 10	Sanfrecce Hiroshima	2–2	Kawasaki Frontale

3 May 2024 11	Albirex Niigata	1–1	Sanfrecce Hiroshima

6 May 2024 12	Sanfrecce Hiroshima	2–3	Nagoya Grampus

15 May 2024 14	Sanfrecce Hiroshima	1–3	Kashima Antlers

19 May 2024 15	Kyoto Sanga	0–5	Sanfrecce Hiroshima

26 May 2024 16	Cerezo Osaka	1–1	Sanfrecce Hiroshima

1 June 2024 17	Sanfrecce Hiroshima	2–0	Júbilo Iwata

15 June 2024 18	Sanfrecce Hiroshima	4–1	Tokyo Verdy

19 June 2024 13	Yokohama F. Marinos	3–2	Sanfrecce Hiroshima

22 June 2024 19	Kashiwa Reysol	0–1	Sanfrecce Hiroshima

26 June 2024 20	Sanfrecce Hiroshima	1–1	Albirex Niigata

29 June 2024 21	Kawasaki Frontale	1–1	Sanfrecce Hiroshima

5 July 2024 22	Sanfrecce Hiroshima	1–3	Vissel Kobe

14 July 2024 23	Sanfrecce Hiroshima	1–0	Avispa Fukuoka

21 July 2024 24	Sagan Tosu	1–4	Sanfrecce Hiroshima

7 August 2024 25	Tokyo Verdy	0–1	Sanfrecce Hiroshima

11 August 2024 26	Sanfrecce Hiroshima	2–0	Cerezo Osaka

17 August 2024 27	Nagoya Grampus	1–2	Sanfrecce Hiroshima

25 August 2024 28	Sanfrecce Hiroshima	2–0	Kashiwa Reysol

31 August 2024 29	Sanfrecce Hiroshima	3–2	FC Tokyo

13 September 2024 30	Kashima Antlers	2–2	Sanfrecce Hiroshima

22 September 2024 31	Sanfrecce Hiroshima	6–2	Yokohama F. Marinos

28 September 2024 32	Sanfrecce Hiroshima	2–0	Machida Zelvia

6 October 2024 33	Júbilo Iwata	1–2	Sanfrecce Hiroshima

19 October 2024 34	Shonan Bellmare	2–1	Sanfrecce Hiroshima

3 November 2024 35	Sanfrecce Hiroshima	0–1	Kyoto Sanga

10 November 2024 36	Urawa Red Diamonds	3–0	Sanfrecce Hiroshima

1 December 2024 37	Sanfrecce Hiroshima	5–1	Hokkaido Consadole Sapporo	Hiroshima
14:00 UTC+9	Kato 8'; Higashi 45+2'; Arslan 55' (pen.); Sotiriou 79', 87'		Suzuki 42'	Stadium: Edion Peace Wing Hiroshima; Referee: Koichiro Fukushima

8 December 2024 38	Gamba Osaka	3–1	Sanfrecce Hiroshima

=== Emperor's Cup ===
12 June 2024 Second round	Sanfrecce Hiroshima	11–2	Baleine Shimonoseki

10 July 2024 Third round	Sanfrecce Hiroshima	4–0	Iwaki FC

21 August 2024 Round of 16	Sanfrecce Hiroshima	2–0	Ehime FC

11 September 2024 Quarter-finals	Sanfrecce Hiroshima	1–2	Gamba Osaka

=== J.League Cup ===
24 April 2024 Second round	Nara Club	0–6	Sanfrecce Hiroshima

22 May 2024 Third round	Tokyo Verdy	2–3	Sanfrecce Hiroshima

5 June 2024 Playoff Round First Leg	FC Tokyo	1–2	Sanfrecce Hiroshima

9 June 2024 Playoff Round Second Leg	Sanfrecce Hiroshima	3–1 (5–2 agg.)	FC Tokyo

4 September 2024 Quarter-finals First Leg	Nagoya Grampus	0–1	Sanfrecce Hiroshima

8 September 2024 Quarter-finals Second Leg	Sanfrecce Hiroshima	1–2 (a.e.t.) (2–2 agg.) (1–3 p)	Nagoya Grampus

=== AFC Champions League Two ===
==== Group stage ====
Pos	Team	Pld	W	D	L	GF	GA	GD	Pts	Qualification
1	(Japan) Sanfrecce Hiroshima	6	5	1	0	14	5	+9	16	Advance to round of 16
2	(Australia) Sydney FC	6	4	0	2	17	6	+11	12	Advance to round of 16
3	(Philippines) Kaya–Iloilo	6	1	1	4	6	14	−8	4	
4	(Hong Kong) Eastern	6	1	0	5	7	19	−12	3	

Source: AFC
Rules for classification: Tiebreakers

19 September 2024 1	Sanfrecce Hiroshima (Japan)	3–0	(Philippines) Kaya–Iloilo	Hiroshima, Japan
	Douglas Vieira 37'; Paciência 54'; O. Iyoha 64'			Stadium: Edion Peace Wing Hiroshima; Attendance: 6,806

3 October 2024 2	Eastern (Hong Kong)	2–3	(Japan) Sanfrecce Hiroshima	Kowloon, Hong Kong
	Daniel Vera 6'; Noah Baffoe 46'		Matsumoto 40'; Nakajima 41'; Araki 90+5'	Stadium: Mong Kok Stadium; Attendance: 4,365

23 October 2024 3	Sanfrecce Hiroshima (Japan)	2–1	(Australia) Sydney FC	Hiroshima, Japan
	Higashi 20'; Sotiriou 55'		Segecic 90'	Stadium: Edion Peace Wing Hiroshima; Attendance: 12,209

7 November 2024 4	Sydney FC (Australia)	0–1	(Japan) Sanfrecce Hiroshima	Sydney, Australia
			Kato 60'	Stadium: Jubilee Oval; Attendance: 3,512

28 November 2024 5	Kaya–Iloilo (Philippines)	1–1	(Japan) Sanfrecce Hiroshima	Manila, Philippines
	Komaki 18'		Inoue 68'	Stadium: Rizal Memorial Stadium; Attendance: 341

5 December 2024 6	Sanfrecce Hiroshima (Japan)	4–1	(Hong Kong) Eastern	Hiroshima
	Aoyama 36'; Paciência 53'; Nakajima 57'; Sotiriou 73'		Ng Yu Hei 10'	Stadium: Edion Peace Wing Hiroshima; Attendance: 9,694
