= Tolgay Arslan =

German footballer

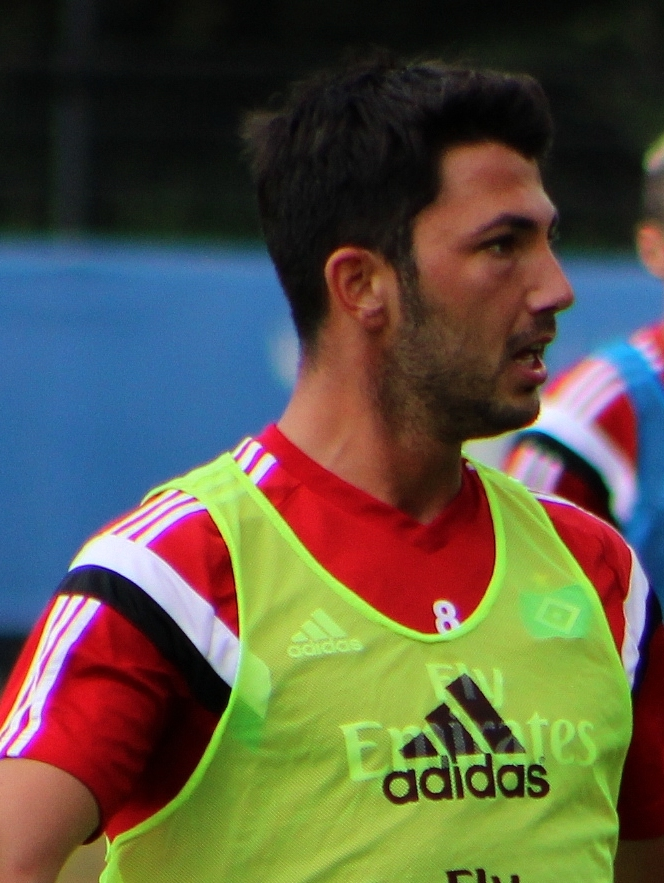
- Arslan with Hamburger SV in 2014

Personal information
- Full name: Tolgay Ali Arslan
- Date of birth: 16 August 1990 (age 36)
- Place of birth: Paderborn, West Germany
- Height: 1.80 m (5 ft 11 in)
- Position: Midfielder

Youth career
- 1996–2003: Grün-Weiß Paderborn
- 2003–2009: Borussia Dortmund

Senior career*
Years	Team	Apps	(Gls)
2009–2015	Hamburger SV	83	(2)
2010–2011	→ Alemannia Aachen (loan)	31	(6)
2015–2018	Beşiktaş	132	(3)
2019–2020	Fenerbahçe	33	(2)
2020–2023	Udinese	101	(5)
2023–2024	Melbourne City	34	(19)
2024–2026	Sanfrecce Hiroshima	32	(10)
Total		446	(47)

International career
2009	Turkey U19	2	(1)
2010	Turkey U21	1	(0)
2011	Germany U20	1	(0)
2012–2013	Germany U21	3	(0)
- * Club domestic league appearances and goals

Tolgay Ali Arslan (Turkish pronunciation: [toɫɡaj ali aɾsɫan]; born August 16, 1990) is a German former professional footballer who played as a midfielder.

He has represented both Germany and Turkey internationally at youth level.

== Club career ==
=== Early career ===
Arslan was born and raised in Germany, in Paderborn, to Turkish parents from Çorum; his father Erhan Arslan, a real estate agent, moved to Germany when he was 11 years old. He began playing football at the age of six, when his father brought him along to watch Grün-Weiß Paderborn play. Arslan began his career with the local club. Patterning his game around Zinedine Zidane and Gheorghe Hagi, Arslan earned a move to Borussia Dortmund in 2003. After several years in Dortmund's youth team, Arslan moved to Hamburger SV.

=== Hamburger SV ===
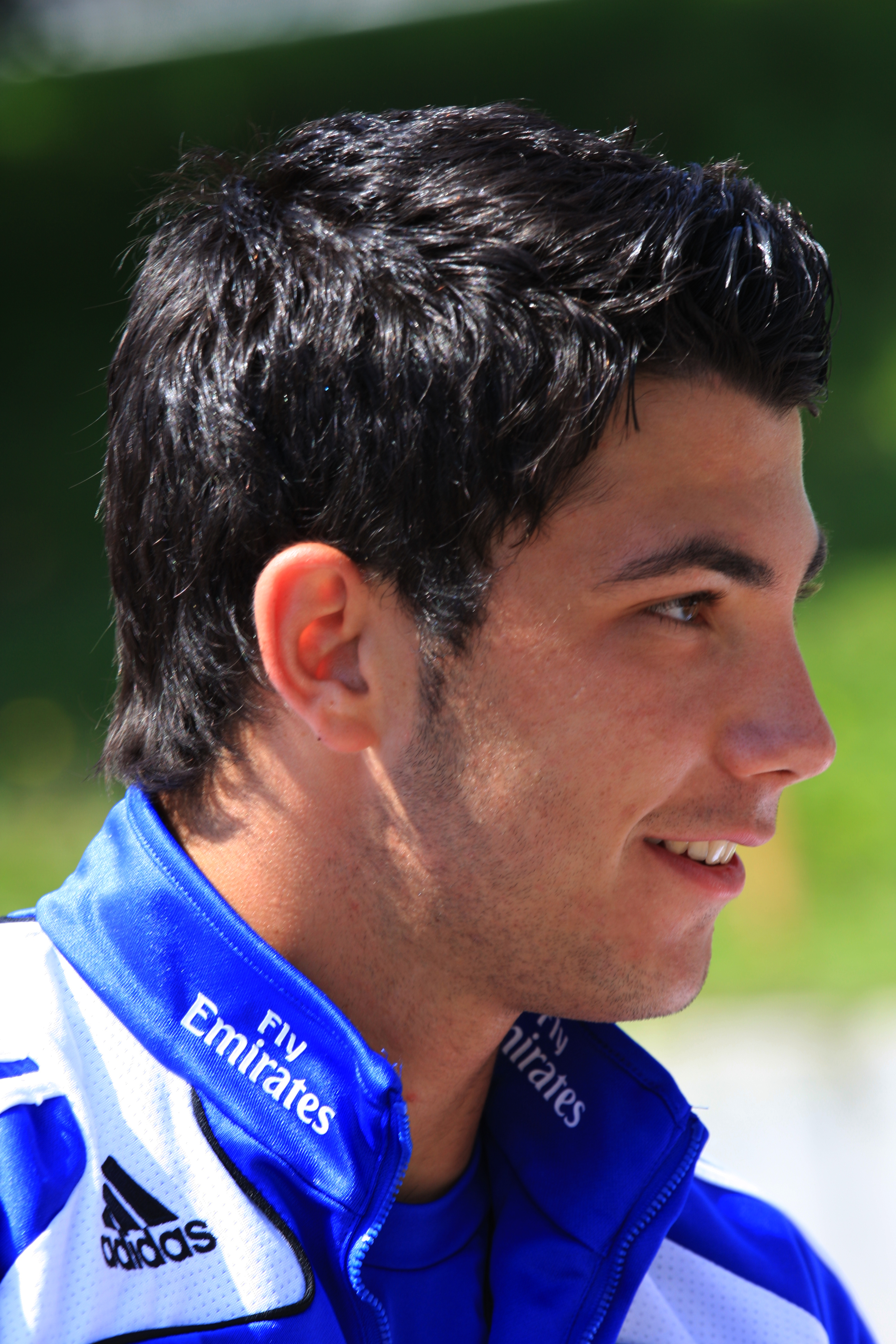
Arslan with Hamburger SV in 2009

Arslan moved to Hamburger SV on a free transfer in 2009. He made his debut on 23 September 2009, coming in the 70th minute as a substitute for Marcus Berg in the second round of the DFB-Pokal against Osnabrück. Hamburg managed a 3–3 draw, but went on to lose 5–7 following a penalty shootout. Arslan made his league debut on 17 October 2009 in a 0–0 draw against Bayer Leverkusen.

He moved on loan to Alemannia Aachen for the 2010–11 season and scored his first goal for the club in the fifth week of the 2. Bundesliga in a 3–1 win against FSV Frankfurt.

=== Beşiktaş ===
On 27 January 2015, Arslan signed a four-and-a-half-year deal with Süper Lig club Beşiktaş. He came on as a substitute for José Sosa on 26 February in the 60th minute of a UEFA Europa League last 32 second leg against Liverpool, and 15 minutes later scored the only goal of the game, taking it to a penalty shootout in which he scored Beşiktaş' last attempt before Dejan Lovren missed to eliminate Liverpool.

=== Fenerbahçe and Udinese ===
In January 2019 he moved to Fenerbahçe where he will play until June 2020 and then change league by going to Italy for three seasons for Udinese.

=== Melbourne City ===
On 15 June 2023, his move to Australia was announced, signing a two-year contract with Melbourne City. He made his debut in the Australia Cup against Oakleigh Cannons, in which he scored two penalties in a 3–2 win. His goalscoring run would continue for the next two rounds of the 2023 Australia Cup, with a deflection goal credited to Arslan coming from a shot from Steven Ugarkovic against Wellington Phoenix and a penalty rebound against the North Eastern MetroStars. His departure from the club was then announced on 9 July 2024.

=== Sanfrecce Hiroshima ===
On 21 July 2024 it was announced that Tolgay had signed for J1 League side Sanfrecce Hiroshima. On 11 August 2024, he scored his first goal for the club against Cerezo Osaka also achieving a brace. On 31 August 2024, he scored a hat-trick in a 3–2 victory over FC Tokyo.

== International career ==
Arslan began his career with the Turkey youth teams in 2009. He made two appearances for the U-19 team in 2009. He made his first appearance for the Turkey national under-21 football team against the Republic of Ireland on 7 September 2010.

In December 2010, Arslan switched to the German Football Association. He was first called up to the Germany national under-21 team to face, of all teams, Turkey on 14 November 2012.

== Personal life ==
In November 2018, it was decided that Arslan would perform his military service for Turkey in June 2019.

== Career statistics ==
Appearances and goals by club, season and competition
Club	Season	League			National cup (Note: Includes DFB-Pokal, Turkish Cup, Coppa Italia, Australia Cup, Emperor's Cup)		League cup (Note: Includes J.League Cup)		Continental		Other		Total	
Club	Season	Division	Apps	Goals	Apps	Goals	Apps	Goals	Apps	Goals	Apps	Goals	Apps	Goals
Hamburger SV	2009–10	Bundesliga	5	0	1	0	—		0	0	—		6	0
Hamburger SV	2011–12	Bundesliga	8	1	0	0	—		—		—		8	1
Hamburger SV	2012–13	Bundesliga	25	0	1	0	—		—		—		26	0
Hamburger SV	2013–14	Bundesliga	32	1	4	0	—		—		1 (Note: Appearance in Bundesliga relegation play-offs)	0	37	1
Hamburger SV	2014–15	Bundesliga	13	0	2	0	—		—		—		15	0
Hamburger SV	Total		83	2	8	0	—		0	0	1	0	92	2
Alemannia Aachen (loan)	2010–11	2. Bundesliga	31	6	4	0	—		—		—		35	6
Beşiktaş	2014–15	Süper Lig	16	0	3	1	—		3 (Note: Appearances in UEFA Europa League)	1	—		22	2
Beşiktaş	2015–16	Süper Lig	6	0	1	0	—		0	0	—		7	0
Beşiktaş	2016–17	Süper Lig	30	0	3	0	—		10 (Note: Five appearances in UEFA Champions League, five appearances in UEFA Europa League)	0	1 (Note: Appearance in Turkish Super Cup)	0	44	0
Beşiktaş	2017–18	Süper Lig	29	0	6	0	—		6 (Note: Appearances in UEFA Champions League)	0	1	0	42	0
Beşiktaş	2018–19	Süper Lig	8	0	0	0	—		8	1	0	0	16	1
Beşiktaş	Total		89	0	13	1	—		27	2	2	0	131	3
Fenerbahçe	2018–19	Süper Lig	11	0	0	0	—		1	0	—		12	0
Fenerbahçe	2019–20	Süper Lig	13	0	8	2	—		—		—		21	2
Fenerbahçe	Total		24	0	8	2	—		1	0	—		33	2
Udinese	2020–21	Serie A	30	3	1	0	—		—		—		31	3
Udinese	2021–22	Serie A	30	1	3	0	—		—		—		33	1
Udinese	2022–23	Serie A	36	1	0	0	—		—		—		36	1
Udinese	Total		66	5	4	0	—		—		—		70	5
Melbourne City	2023–24	A League Men	24	13	4	0	—		6 (Note: Appearances in AFC Champions League)	2	—		34	15
Sanfrecce Hiroshima	2024	J1 League	14	8	2	1	2	1	3 (Note: Appearances in AFC Champions League Two)	0	—		21	10
Sanfrecce Hiroshima	2025	J1 League	9	2	1	0	3	0	5 (Note: One appearance in AFC Champions League Two, four appearances in AFC Champions League Elite)	0	1 (Note: Appearance in Japanese Super Cup)	1	19	4
Sanfrecce Hiroshima	2026	J1 League	9	0	—		—		1 (Note: Appearances in AFC Champions League Elite)	0	—		10	0
Sanfrecce Hiroshima	Total		32	10	3	1	5	1	9	0	1	1	50	14
Career total			318	36	40	8	5	1	48	4	4	1	425	50

== Honours ==
Beşiktaş

- Süper Lig: 2015–16, 2016–17

Sanfrecce Hiroshima

- J.League Cup: 2025
- Japanese Super Cup: 2025

Individual

- PFA A-League Team of the Season: 2023–24
- A-Leagues All Star: 2024
