= 2018 FC Gifu season =

FC Gifu
2018 season
- Manager: Takeshi Oki
- Stadium: Gifu Nagaragawa Stadium
- J2 League: 20th
- Emperor's Cup: 3rd round
- Highest home attendance: 12,045 v Tokyo Verdy (23/09/2018)
- Lowest home attendance: 3,819 v Tochigi SC (21/03/2018)
- Average home league attendance: 6,858
| Home colours | Away colours |

2018 FC Gifu season.

== J2 League ==
| Match | Date | Team | Score | Team | Venue | Attendance |
|---|---|---|---|---|---|---|
| 1 | 2018.02.25 | Avispa Fukuoka | 2-0 | FC Gifu | Level5 Stadium | 12,856 |
| 2 | 2018.03.03 | FC Gifu | 0-1 | Yokohama FC | Gifu Nagaragawa Stadium | 9,331 |
| 3 | 2018.03.11 | JEF United Chiba | 2-3 | FC Gifu | Fukuda Denshi Arena | 8,845 |
| 4 | 2018.03.17 | Kyoto Sanga FC | 2-1 | FC Gifu | Kyoto Nishikyogoku Athletic Stadium | 5,436 |
| 5 | 2018.03.21 | FC Gifu | 1-1 | Tochigi SC | Gifu Nagaragawa Stadium | 3,819 |
| 6 | 2018.03.25 | Ehime FC | 1-3 | FC Gifu | Ningineer Stadium | 2,348 |
| 7 | 2018.04.01 | FC Gifu | 3-4 | Ventforet Kofu | Gifu Nagaragawa Stadium | 6,796 |
| 8 | 2018.04.07 | Tokyo Verdy | 0-0 | FC Gifu | Ajinomoto Stadium | 3,169 |
| 9 | 2018.04.15 | FC Gifu | 0-0 | Tokushima Vortis | Gifu Nagaragawa Stadium | 7,217 |
| 10 | 2018.04.21 | Fagiano Okayama | 0-0 | FC Gifu | City Light Stadium | 8,668 |
| 11 | 2018.04.28 | FC Gifu | 0-1 | Zweigen Kanazawa | Gifu Nagaragawa Stadium | 5,932 |
| 12 | 2018.05.03 | Roasso Kumamoto | 1-2 | FC Gifu | Egao Kenko Stadium | 5,247 |
| 13 | 2018.05.06 | FC Gifu | 2-0 | Matsumoto Yamaga FC | Gifu Nagaragawa Stadium | 7,018 |
| 14 | 2018.05.13 | Oita Trinita | 2-1 | FC Gifu | Oita Bank Dome | 6,609 |
| 15 | 2018.05.19 | Omiya Ardija | 0-2 | FC Gifu | NACK5 Stadium Omiya | 7,133 |
| 16 | 2018.05.26 | FC Gifu | 2-1 | Albirex Niigata | Gifu Nagaragawa Stadium | 7,254 |
| 17 | 2018.06.02 | FC Gifu | 4-0 | Mito HollyHock | Gifu Nagaragawa Stadium | 7,668 |
| 18 | 2018.06.10 | Kamatamare Sanuki | 0-1 | FC Gifu | Pikara Stadium | 2,014 |
| 19 | 2018.06.17 | FC Gifu | 0-1 | FC Machida Zelvia | Gifu Nagaragawa Stadium | 7,784 |
| 20 | 2018.06.23 | FC Gifu | 2-2 | Renofa Yamaguchi FC | Gifu Nagaragawa Stadium | 8,317 |
| 21 | 2018.06.30 | Montedio Yamagata | 2-0 | FC Gifu | ND Soft Stadium Yamagata | 5,368 |
| 22 | 2018.07.08 | FC Gifu | 1-2 | Ehime FC | Gifu Nagaragawa Stadium | 5,787 |
| 23 | 2018.07.15 | Ventforet Kofu | 1-3 | FC Gifu | Yamanashi Chuo Bank Stadium | 7,798 |
| 24 | 2018.07.21 | Yokohama FC | 3-0 | FC Gifu | NHK Spring Mitsuzawa Football Stadium | 3,782 |
| 25 | 2018.07.25 | FC Gifu | 2-3 | Kamatamare Sanuki | Gifu Nagaragawa Stadium | 4,899 |
| 26 | 2018.07.29 | FC Gifu | 0-2 | Oita Trinita | Gifu Nagaragawa Stadium | 6,068 |
| 27 | 2018.08.04 | Tochigi SC | 4-1 | FC Gifu | Tochigi Green Stadium | 3,763 |
| 28 | 2018.08.11 | FC Gifu | 2-3 | Kyoto Sanga FC | Gifu Nagaragawa Stadium | 7,003 |
| 29 | 2018.08.19 | FC Gifu | 0-2 | Roasso Kumamoto | Gifu Nagaragawa Stadium | 5,093 |
| 30 | 2018.08.26 | FC Machida Zelvia | 1-0 | FC Gifu | Machida Stadium | 4,289 |
| 31 | 2018.09.01 | FC Gifu | 0-1 | Omiya Ardija | Gifu Nagaragawa Stadium | 5,247 |
| 32 | 2018.09.08 | Albirex Niigata | 5-0 | FC Gifu | Denka Big Swan Stadium | 11,274 |
| 33 | 2018.09.15 | Tokushima Vortis | 2-1 | FC Gifu | Pocarisweat Stadium | 4,773 |
| 34 | 2018.09.23 | FC Gifu | 1-1 | Tokyo Verdy | Gifu Nagaragawa Stadium | 12,045 |
| 35 | 2018.09.30 | Zweigen Kanazawa | 2-0 | FC Gifu | Ishikawa Athletics Stadium | 2,301 |
| 36 | 2018.10.07 | Renofa Yamaguchi FC | 4-1 | FC Gifu | Shimonoseki Stadium | 3,936 |
| 37 | 2018.10.13 | FC Gifu | 2-1 | Fagiano Okayama | Gifu Nagaragawa Stadium | 5,401 |
| 38 | 2018.10.21 | Matsumoto Yamaga FC | 0-0 | FC Gifu | Sunpro Alwin | 14,709 |
| 39 | 2018.10.28 | FC Gifu | 2-0 | JEF United Chiba | Gifu Nagaragawa Stadium | 6,406 |
| 40 | 2018.11.04 | FC Gifu | 0-1 | Montedio Yamagata | Gifu Nagaragawa Stadium | 6,056 |
| 41 | 2018.11.11 | Mito HollyHock | 1-1 | FC Gifu | K's denki Stadium Mito | 7,056 |
| 42 | 2018.11.17 | FC Gifu | 0-0 | Avispa Fukuoka | Gifu Nagaragawa Stadium | 8,870 |
