= Lokman Gör =

Turkish footballer (born 1990)

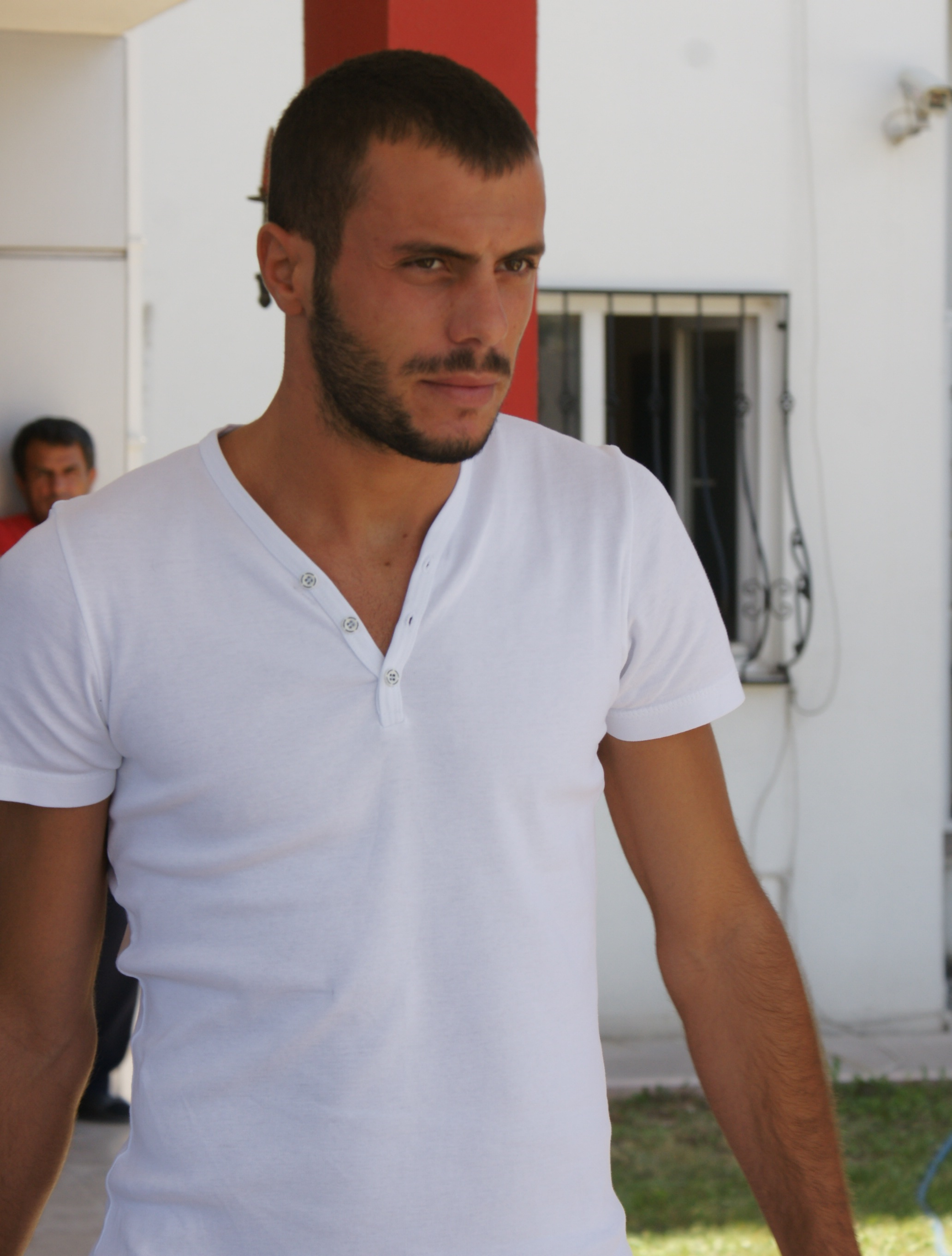
- Gör in 2012

Personal information
- Date of birth: 15 December 1990 (age 35)
- Place of birth: Rize, Turkey
- Height: 1.87 m (6 ft 2 in)
- Position: Defender

Team information
- Current team: Etimesgut Belediyespor
- Number: 53

Youth career
- 2002–2004: Fenerbahçe
- 2004–2005: Pendikspor
- 2005–2007: Gebzespor
- 2007–2008: Kasımpaşa

Senior career*
Years	Team	Apps	(Gls)
2008–2012	Pendikspor	54	(2)
2012–2016	Antalyaspor	45	(2)
2012–2013	→ Samsunspor (loan)	27	(2)
2013–2014	→ Osmanlıspor (loan)	30	(0)
2016	→ Şanlıurfaspor (loan)	12	(1)
2016–2017	Göztepe	22	(2)
2017–2019	BB Erzurumspor	54	(5)
2019–2020	Alanyaspor	1	(0)
2020–2021	Altay	18	(0)
2021–2022	Bandırmaspor	30	(2)
2022–2023	Bucaspor 1928	22	(0)
2023–	Etimesgut Belediyespor	4	(0)

International career^{‡}
2014–2015	Turkey A2	2	(0)
- * Club domestic league appearances and goals as of 23 September 2023 ‡ National team caps and goals as of 4 August 2017

Lokman Gör (born 15 December 1990) is a Turkish professional footballer who plays as a defender for Etimesgut Belediyespor.

== Professional career ==
Lokman spent most of his early career in the second division of Turkey, but helped Antalyaspor get promoted to the Süper Lig for the 2015–16 season. He made his professional debut in a 3–2 win over İstanbul Başakşehir F.K. on 15 August 2015. Lokman transferred to Göztepe and helped them get promoted to the Süper Lig for the 2017–18 season.

== International career ==
Lokman first represented Turkey A2 in a friendly tournament 4–4 tie with Slovakia B.
