= Merter Yüce =

Turkish footballer

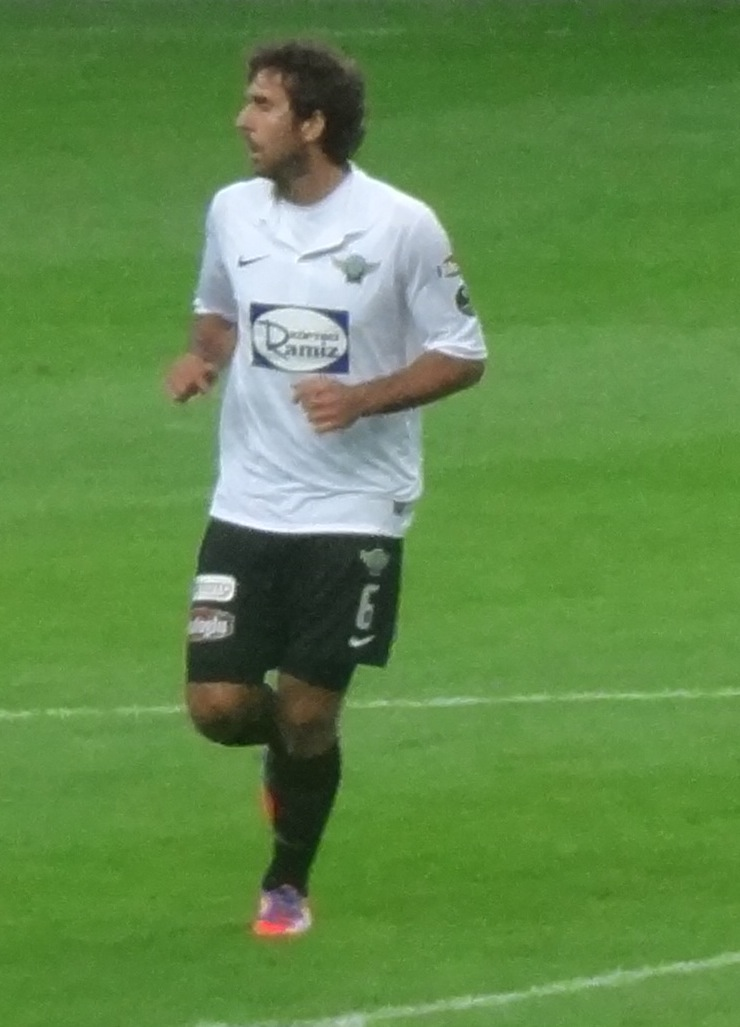
- Merter Yüce (2012)

Personal information
- Date of birth: 18 February 1985 (age 41)
- Place of birth: Bornova, İzmir, Turkey
- Height: 1.92 m (6 ft 4 in)
- Position: Defensive midfielder

Youth career
- 1999–2004: Altay

Senior career*
Years	Team	Apps	(Gls)
2004–2009	Altay	131	(8)
2009–2010	Kayserispor	4	(0)
2010	Kayseri Erciyesspor	13	(0)
2010–2011	Giresunspor	10	(0)
2011–2012	Karabükspor	8	(0)
2012–2016	Akhisar Belediyespor	108	(1)
2016–2018	Bursaspor	30	(0)
2018	Fatih Karagümrük	0	(0)
2019–2020	Altay	9	(0)
- * Club domestic league appearances and goals

Merter Yüce (born 18 February 1985) is a retired Turkish professional footballer who played as a defensive midfielder.
