= Ersan Gülüm =

Turkish footballer

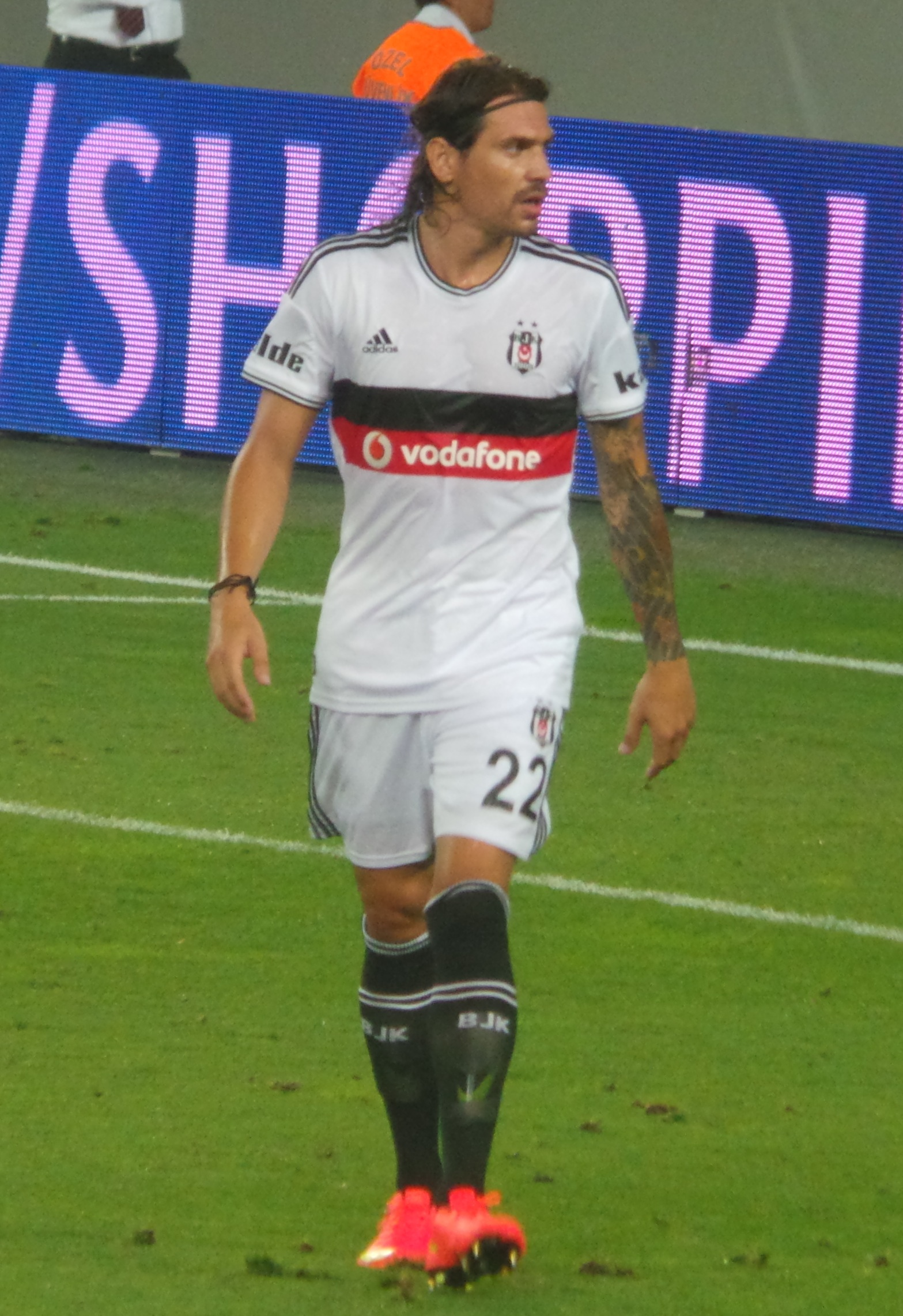
- Gülüm playing for Beşiktaş in 2014

Personal information
- Full name: Ersan Adem Gülüm
- Date of birth: 17 May 1987 (age 39)
- Place of birth: Carlton, Melbourne, Victoria, Australia
- Height: 1.86 m (6 ft 1 in)
- Position: Centre back

Team information
- Current team: Hume City (President)

Youth career
- 1999: Green Gully
- 2001: Meadow Park
- 2002–2004: North Coburg

Senior career*
Years	Team	Apps	(Gls)
2005	North Coburg	22	(2)
2005–2008	Manisaspor	2	(0)
2008	Elazığspor	13	(1)
2008–2011	Adanaspor	60	(3)
2010–2011	→ Beşiktaş (loan)	10	(0)
2011–2016	Beşiktaş	84	(2)
2016–2018	Hebei China Fortune	24	(2)
2017	→ Beşiktaş (loan)	0	(0)
2017–2018	→ Adelaide United (loan)	22	(0)
2019	Whittlesea United	0	(0)
2019–2020	Western United	9	(0)
2020–2021	Antalyaspor	16	(1)
2022	Preston Lions	2	(0)

International career^{‡}
2007–2010	Australia U23	2	(0)
2013–2015	Turkey	7	(0)

Managerial career
- 2022–2023: Hume City FC
- * Club domestic league appearances and goals as of 1 April 2022 ‡ National team caps and goals as of 28 March 2015

Ersan Adem Gülüm (Turkish pronunciation: [æɾˈsan ˈaːdem ˈɟylym]; born 17 May 1987) is a former professional soccer player who last played as a centre back for Preston Lions in the NPL Victoria 3 and current president of Hume City FC. Born in Australia, Gülüm played for Australia at under-23 level before electing to represent Turkey in senior competition.

== Early life ==
Gülüm grew up in the Melbourne suburb of Meadow Heights.

== Career ==
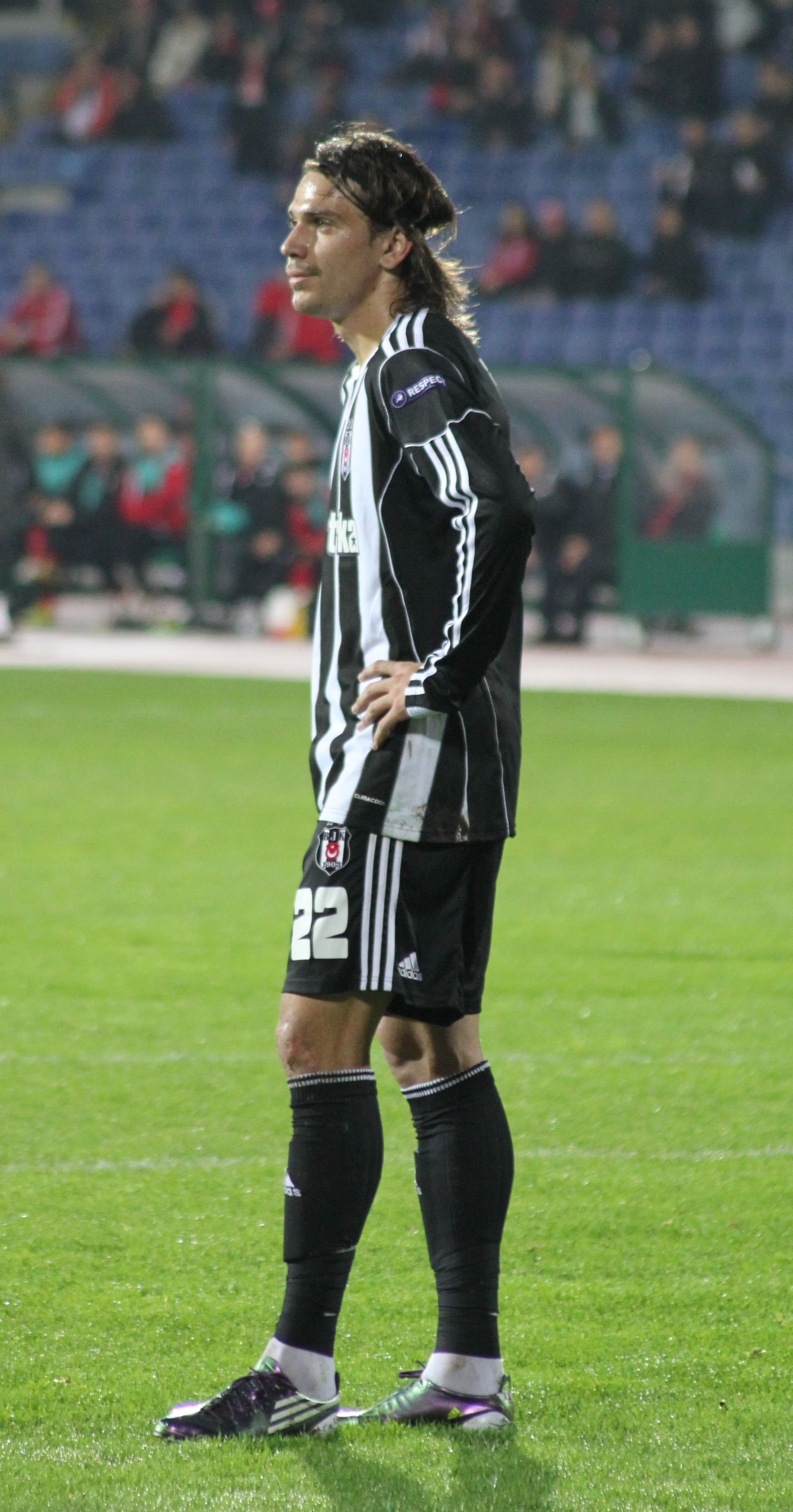
Gülüm in 2010

Gülüm progressed up the ranks after playing exceptional football for Hume City as an 18-year-old. He was originally transferred to Turkish Super League team Manisaspor in 2005, after being spotted by Leading Teams Operations Manager Ezel Hikmet and referred to experienced Turkish coach Ersun Yanal whilst playing for and captaining the Australian School Boys team touring the United Kingdom. Impressed with the raw talent of the young defender, Gülüm was a part of the senior squad for the entire season as a backup defender, but only managed 2 Super League and 2 Turkish Cup matches. Gülüm was transferred to Elazigspor in February 2008, where he managed to play in every match, gaining a reputation as a strong left footed defender. After a solid second half of the season, Gülüm was transferred to Adanaspor for the 2008–09 signing a lucrative three-year deal, where he played 30 League matches and was rewarded for his great form by being selected in the team of the year as the best central defender in the competition.

On 17 July 2010, despite being heavily linked with Galatasaray, Gülüm transferred to rival Turkish club Beşiktaş with Adanaspor acquiring an option to loan Gülüm back for one season.

After he had a productive season with Beşiktaş, they acquired Gülüm's full rights for a fee of €4 million.

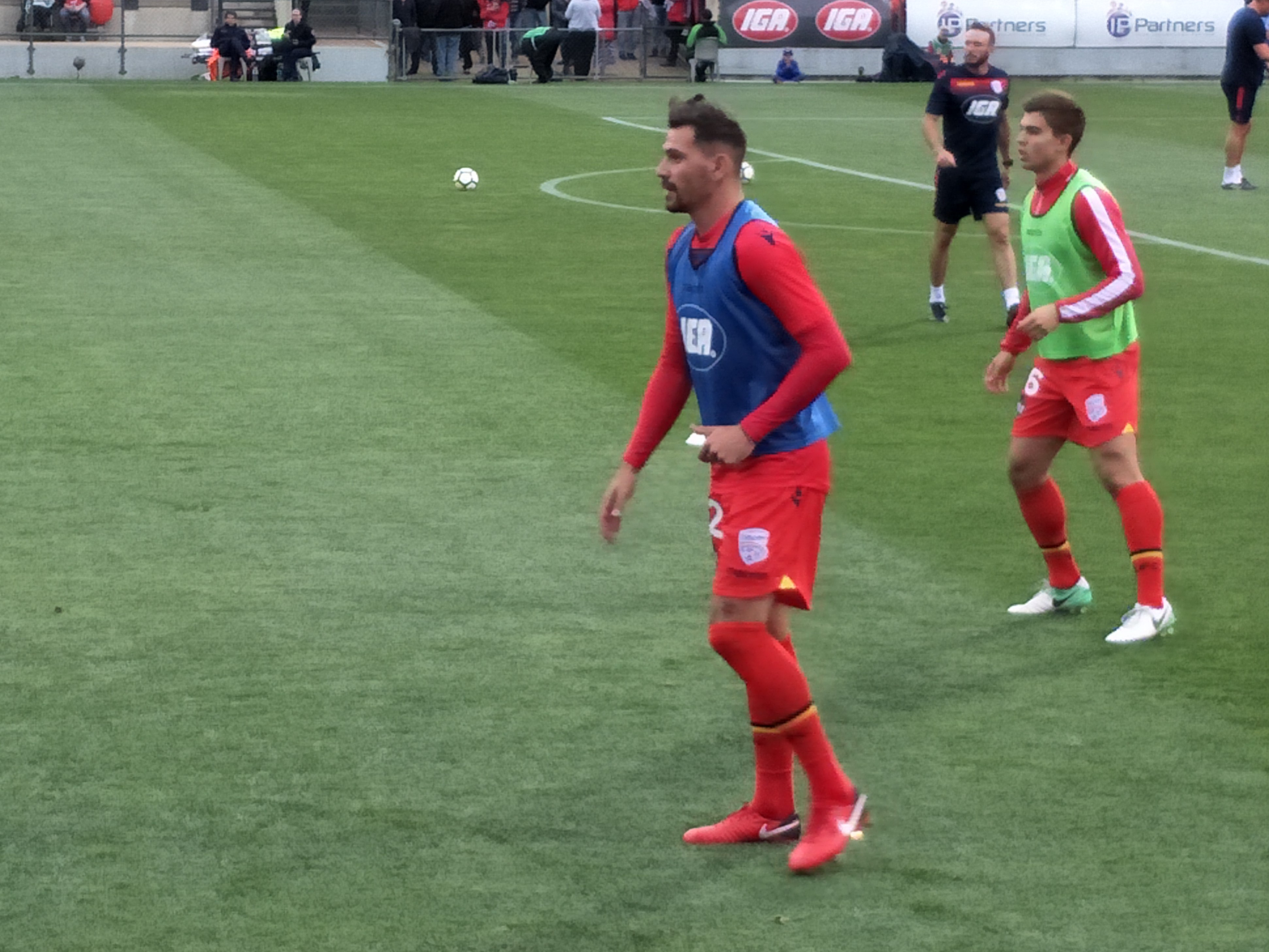
Gülüm training with Adelaide United in 2017

On 17 July 2017, Gülüm transferred to Adelaide United on a season long loan from Hebei China Fortune Adelaide United announced that Gülüm had returned to Hebei China Fortune after making 22 appearances on loan to the Adelaide club.

In November 2018, Gülüm returned to Melbourne, joining Victorian State League Division 1 side Whittlesea United as player-manager.

On 7 May 2019, Gülüm signed for new A-League club Western United for the upcoming 2019–20 A-League season.

== International career ==
Gülüm was born in Australia to Turkish parents, meaning that he was eligible to play for Australia and Turkey from birth as per the FIFA eligibility criteria.

=== Australia under-23s ===
Gülüm was involved in Australia's qualifying campaign for the 2008 Summer Olympics, he made his international debut for the Australia national under-23 association football team as an 84th-minute substitute replacing Ruben Zadkovich on 6 June 2007 away to Jordan in Ammam.

In November 2010, it was speculated that he would be selected for Australia's friendly against Egypt. After the call-up did not come, Gülüm chose to represent Turkey and said that he often felt overlooked by Football Federation Australia: "For me it has been a case of being overlooked at all levels in the past for Australia, for whatever the reason has been."

=== Turkey ===
Former Australia head coach Guus Hiddink swooped and added Gülüm to the Turkish squad scheduled to play the Netherlands on 17 November 2010, although he did not make his international debut for the Crescent Stars in that match.

The following month, Australia coach Osieck had met with Gülüm while the Australian men's team was touring Europe and stated that Gülüm was "very positive" about representing Australia. Gülüm was named on the 50-man shortlist for Australia's 2011 AFC Asian Cup campaign, but was not selected in the final 23-man squad. Osieck told the press that Gülüm's father "said Ersan should opt for Turkey because he plays in Turkey and makes his living there and they both feel a lot of pressure from the Turkish media and the Besiktas supporters".

When Gülüm was again called up to the Turkey national team in November 2012, this time by Abdullah Avcı he said he was proud to be a part of the national team. He was left off the team on the roster when the team played Romania on 12 October 2012. He was an unused sub in Turkey's 6 September 2013 match against Andorra. He made his first appearance for Turkey as a 90th-minute substitute on 10 September 2013 in a 2014 FIFA World Cup qualifying game against Romania.

== Honours ==
Beşiktaş

- Süper Lig: 2015–16, 2016–17
- Türkiye Kupası: 2010–11
