= Osmanlı Stadium =

Football stadium in Sincan, Ankara, Turkey

Ankara Yenikent Stadyumu
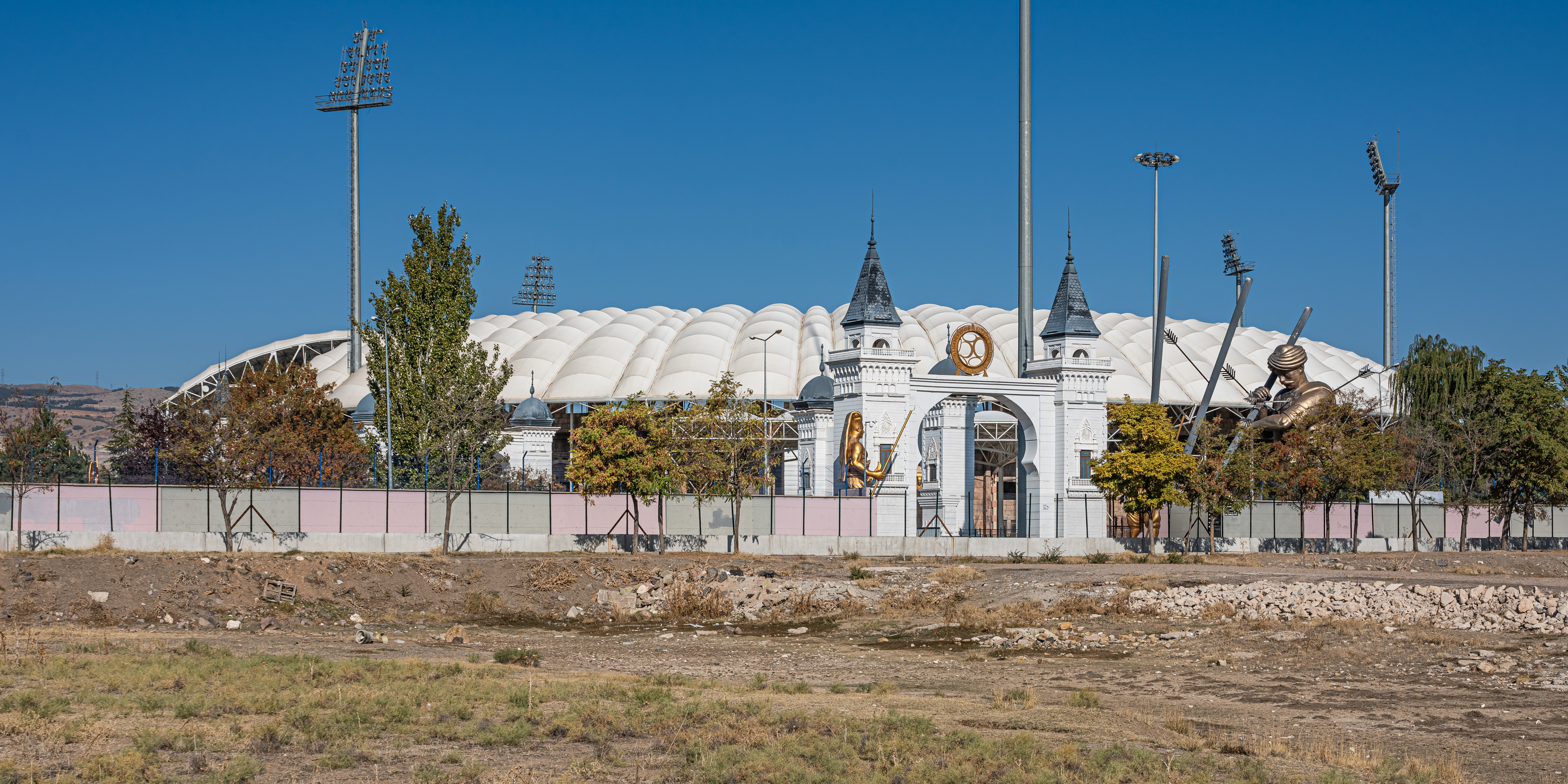
- Interactive map of Ankara Yenikent Stadyumu
- Former names: Osmanlı Kalesi
- Location: Sincan, Ankara, Turkey
- Coordinates: 40°0′41″N 32°30′8″E
- Owner: Ankara Metropolitan Municipality
- Capacity: 18,029
- Surface: Grass
- Field size: 68 m × 105 m (223 ft × 344 ft)

Construction
- Opened: 1974
- Renovated: 2008

Tenants
- Ankaraspor (1978–present); MKE Ankaragücü (2018–2019); Gençlerbirliği S.K. (2018–2019)

Osmanlı Stadium (Turkish: Osmanlı Stadyumu) is a football stadium, based in Sincan, Turkey. The stadium holds 18,029 people, and was built in 1974 and renovated in 2008.
