= 2017–18 Beşiktaş J.K. season =

Beşiktaş
2017–18 season
- President: Fikret Orman
- Head coach: Şenol Güneş
- Stadium: Vodafone Park
- Süper Lig: 4th
- Turkish Cup: Semi-final
- Turkish Super Cup: Runners-up
- UEFA Champions League: Round of 16
- Top goalscorer: League: Talisca (14 goals); All: Talisca (19 goals)
Home colours	Away colours	Third colours

The 2017–18 Beşiktaş J.K. season was the club's 114th year since its foundation, 96th season of competitive football and the club's 59th season contesting the Süper Lig, the top division of Turkish football. Beşiktaş were the defending champions of the Süper Lig, having finished first in 2016–17. The 2017–18 season lasted from 1 August 2017 to 30 June 2018;

== Squad ==
As of match played 19 May 2018

No.	Name	Nationality	Position	Date of birth (age)	Signed from	Signed In	Apps.	Goals
Goalkeepers
1	Fabri	(Spain)	GK	31 December 1987 (aged 30)	Deportivo La Coruña	2016	84	0
29	Tolga Zengin (captain)	(Turkey)	GK	10 October 1983 (aged 34)	Trabzonspor	2013	119	0
97	Utku Yuvakuran	(Turkey)	GK	2 November 1997 (aged 20)	Beylerbeyi	2016	3	0
Defenders
3	Adriano	(Brazil)	DF	26 October 1984 (aged 33)	Barcelona	2016	80	4
5	Pepe	(Portugal)	DF	26 February 1983 (aged 35)	Real Madrid	2017	33	2
6	Duško Tošić	(Serbia)	DF	19 January 1985 (aged 33)	Gençlerbirliği	2015	97	7
12	Gary Medel	(Chile)	DF	3 August 1987 (aged 30)	Internazionale	2017	37	1
14	Fatih Aksoy	(Turkey)	DF	6 November 1997 (aged 20)	Academy	2016	12	0
24	Domagoj Vida	(Croatia)	DF	29 April 1989 (aged 29)	Dynamo Kyiv	2018	16	1
33	Atınç Nukan	(Turkey)	DF	20 July 1993 (aged 24)	loan from RB Leipzig	2016	37	2
41	Alpay Çelebi	(Turkey)	DF	4 April 1999 (aged 19)	Academy	2017	2	0
60	Abdullah Çelik	(Austria)	DF	19 July 1997 (aged 20)	Academy	2017	1	0
77	Gökhan Gönül	(Turkey)	DF	4 January 1985 (aged 33)	Fenerbahçe	2016	70	1
88	Caner Erkin	(Turkey)	DF	4 October 1988 (aged 29)	Internazionale	2017	44	0
Midfielders
7	Ricardo Quaresma	(Portugal)	MF	26 September 1983 (aged 34)	Porto	2015	189	34
8	Ryan Babel	(Netherlands)	MF	19 December 1986 (aged 31)	Deportivo La Coruña	2017	67	23
10	Oğuzhan Özyakup	(Turkey)	MF	23 September 1992 (aged 25)	Arsenal	2012	215	27
13	Atiba Hutchinson	(Canada)	MF	8 February 1983 (aged 35)	PSV	2013	190	9
17	Jeremain Lens	(Netherlands)	MF	24 November 1987 (aged 30)	loan from Sunderland	2017	30	4
18	Tolgay Arslan	(Germany)	MF	16 August 1990 (aged 27)	Hamburger SV	2015	114	2
20	Necip Uysal	(Turkey)	MF	24 January 1991 (aged 27)	Academy	2009	274	5
55	Gökhan Töre	(Turkey)	MF	20 January 1992 (aged 26)	Rubin Kazan	2014	112	19
94	Talisca	(Brazil)	MF	1 February 1994 (aged 24)	loan from Benfica	2016	77	35
—	Veli Kavlak	(Austria)	MF	3 November 1988 (aged 29)	Rapid Wien	2011	152	8
Strikers
9	Álvaro Negredo	(Spain)	FW	20 August 1985 (aged 32)	Valencia	2017	40	14
11	Mustafa Pektemek	(Turkey)	FW	11 August 1988 (aged 29)	Gençlerbirliği	2011	132	25
28	Mustafa Apardı	(Turkey)	FW	14 September 1998 (aged 19)	Academy	2017	1	0
30	Vágner Love	(Brazil)	FW	11 June 1984 (aged 33)	Alanyaspor	2018	13	4
95	Cyle Larin	(Canada)	FW	17 April 1995 (aged 23)	Orlando City	2018	4	4
Out on loan
2	Matej Mitrović	(Croatia)	DF	10 November 1993 (aged 24)	Rijeka	2017	22	0
15	Orkan Çınar	(Turkey)	MF	29 January 1996 (aged 22)	Gaziantepspor	2017	5	1
22	Aras Özbiliz	(Armenia)	MF	9 March 1990 (aged 28)	Spartak Moscow	2016	5	1
71	Denys Boyko	(Ukraine)	GK	29 January 1988 (aged 30)	Dnipro	2016	5	0
Players who left during the season
23	Cenk Tosun	(Turkey)	FW	7 June 1991 (aged 26)	Gaziantepspor	2014	141	64
32	Andreas Beck	(Germany)	DF	13 March 1987 (aged 31)	1899 Hoffenheim	2015	80	1
—	Alexander Milošević	(Sweden)	DF	30 January 1992 (aged 26)	AIK	2015	7	0

=== Out on loan ===
Note: Flags indicate national team as defined under FIFA eligibility rules; some limited exceptions apply. Players may hold more than one non-FIFA nationality.

No.	Pos.	Nation	Player
—	GK	UKR	Denys Boyko (at Dynamo Kyiv until 30 June 2018)
—	DF	COL	Pedro Franco (at Boluspor until 30 June 2018)
—	DF	CRO	Matej Mitrović (at Club Brugge until 30 June 2018)
—	MF	ARM	Aras Özbiliz (at Sheriff Tiraspol until 30 June 2018)

No.	Pos.	Nation	Player
—	MF	TUR	Oğuzhan Aydoğan (at Karlsruher SC until 30 June 2018)
—	MF	TUR	Orkan Çınar (at Atiker Konyaspor until 30 June 2018)
—	MF	TUR	Sedat Şahintürk (at Balıkesirspor until 30 June 2018)

== Transfers ==
=== In ===
Date	Position	Nationality	Name	From	Fee	Ref.
1 July 2017	DF	(Turkey)	Caner Erkin	Internazionale		
23 July 2017	DF	(Portugal)	Pepe	Real Madrid		
25 July 2017	MF	(Turkey)	Orkan Çınar	Gaziantepspor		
4 August 2017	FW	(Spain)	Álvaro Negredo	Valencia		
12 August 2017	DF	(Chile)	Gary Medel	Internazionale		
3 January 2018	DF	(Croatia)	Domagoj Vida	Dynamo Kyiv		
31 January 2018	FW	(Brazil)	Vágner Love	Alanyaspor		
31 January 2018	FW	(Canada)	Cyle Larin	Orlando City		

=== Out ===
Date	Position	Nationality	Name	To	Fee	Ref.
12 June 2017	DF	(Brazil)	Rhodolfo	Flamengo		
13 July 2017	DF	(Brazil)	Marcelo	Lyon		
13 July 2017	MF	(Switzerland)	Gökhan Inler	İstanbul Başakşehir		
7 August 2017	FW	(Turkey)	Ömer Şişmanoğlu	Göztepe		
31 August 2017	DF	(Germany)	Andreas Beck	VfB Stuttgart		
8 September 2017	GK	(Turkey)	Hüseyin Yılmaz	Ümraniyespor		
8 September 2017	MF	(Turkey)	Eslem Öztürk	İstanbulspor		
5 January 2018	FW	(Turkey)	Cenk Tosun	Everton	£27,000,000	

=== Loans in ===
Date from	Position	Nationality	Name	From	Date to	Ref.
8 July 2017	DF	(Turkey)	Atınç Nukan	RB Leipzig	End of season	
8 July 2017	MF	(Netherlands)	Jeremain Lens	Sunderland	End of season	

=== Loans out ===
Date from	Position	Nationality	Name	To	Date to	Ref.
21 August 2017	MF	(Turkey)	Oğuzhan Aydoğan	Karlsruher SC	End of season	
7 September 2017	DF	(Colombia)	Pedro Franco	Boluspor	End of season	
7 September 2017	MF	(Turkey)	Sedat Şahintürk	Balıkesirspor	End of season	
8 September 2017	DF	(Sweden)	Alexander Milošević	Çaykur Rizespor	18 December 2017	
19 January 2018	MF	(Turkey)	Orkan Çınar	Konyaspor	End of season	
29 January 2018	DF	(Croatia)	Matej Mitrović	Club Brugge	End of season	
7 February 2018	MF	(Armenia)	Aras Özbiliz	Sheriff Tiraspol	End of season	

=== Released ===
Date	Position	Nationality	Name	Joined	Date
18 December 2017	DF	(Sweden)	Alexander Milošević	AIK	28 February 2018

== Friendlies ==
9 January 2018	Beşiktaş	2–2	ADO Den Haag	Belek
18:00 TRT (UTC+3)	Negredo (penalty missed) 11'; Erkin 60'; Hutchinson 72'	Report	Johnsen 3', 28'	Stadium: Gloria Sports Arena; Attendance: 200

12 January 2018	Beşiktaş	3-2	Skënderbeu Korçë	Belek
TRT (UTC+3)				Stadium: Gloria Sports Arena

== Competitions ==
=== Turkish Super Cup ===
6 August 2017 Final	Beşiktaş	1–2	Konyaspor	Samsun
20:45 TRT (UTC+3)	Tosun 77'; Adriano (yellow card) 90+5'	Report	Traoré 33'; Turan (yellow card) 45+2'; Bourabia (yellow card) 60'; Skubic 90+1' (pen.)	Stadium: Samsun Stadium; Referee: Fırat Aydınus

=== Süper Lig ===
==== League table ====
Pos	Team	Pld	W	D	L	GF	GA	GD	Pts	Qualification or relegation
2	Fenerbahçe	34	21	9	4	78	36	+42	72 (Note: Fenerbahçe ahead of Başakşehir on head-to-head goal difference: Fenerbahçe 2–3 Başakşehir, Başakşehir 0–2 Fenerbahçe.)	Qualification for the Champions League third qualifying round
3	Başakşehir	34	22	6	6	62	34	+28	72	Qualification for the Europa League third qualifying round
4	Beşiktaş	34	21	8	5	69	30	+39	71	Qualification for the Europa League second qualifying round
5	Trabzonspor	34	15	10	9	63	51	+12	55	
6	Göztepe	34	13	10	11	49	50	−1	49 (Note: Göztepe ahead of Sivasspor on head-to-head points: Göztepe 6 pts, Sivasspor 0 pts.)	

Source: Süper Lig, Soccerway
Rules for classification: 1) Points; 2) Head-to-head points; 3) Head-to-head goal difference; 4) Head-to-head goals scored; 5) Goal difference; 6) Goals scored; 7) Play-off.

==== Results summary ====
Overall								Home						Away					
Pld	W	D	L	GF	GA	GD	Pts	W	D	L	GF	GA	GD	W	D	L	GF	GA	GD
34	21	8	5	69	30	+39	71	14	3	0	44	10	+34	7	5	5	25	20	+5

Last updated: 19 May 2018.
Source: See Results

==== Results by matchday ====
Round	1	2	3	4	5	6	7	8	9	10	11	12	13	14	15	16	17	18	19	20	21	22	23	24	25	26	27	28	29	30	31	32	33	34
Ground	H	A	H	A	H	A	H	A	H	A	A	H	A	H	A	H	A	A	H	A	H	A	H	A	H	A	H	H	A	H	A	H	A	H
Result	W	D	W	W	W	L	D	L	D	W	W	D	D	W	D	W	L	W	W	D	W	D	W	W	W	L	W	W	W	W	L	W	W	W
Position	4	3	2	2	2	2	2	6	7	3	3	3	4	4	4	3	4	4	4	4	4	4	3	3	2	3	3	3	2	2	4	4	4	4

Updated to match(es) played on 19 May 2018. Source: Positions by round
A = Away; H = Home; W = Win; D = Draw; L = Loss

==== Results ====
13 August 2017 1	Beşiktaş	2–0	Antalyaspor	Istanbul
21:45 TRT (UTC+3)	Özyakup (yellow card) 12'; Pepe 45+4'; Tošić (yellow card) 58'; Tosun 64' (pen.); Beck (yellow card) 90+1'	Report	Danilo (yellow card) 32'; Čelůstka (yellow card) 45+2'; El Kabir (yellow card) 45+5'; Diego Ângelo (yellow card) 63'	Stadium: Vodafone Park; Referee: Cüneyt Çakır

18 August 2017 2	Kasımpaşa	2–2	Beşiktaş	Istanbul
21:45 TRT (UTC+3)	Neumayr 23'; Sarı (yellow card) 34'; Trézéguet (yellow card) 76', (goal) 78'; Ben Youssef (yellow card) 90'; Rangel (yellow card) 90+4'	Report	Babel 7'; Talisca (yellow card) 31', (goal) 34'; Tošić (yellow card) 39'	Stadium: Recep Tayyip Erdoğan Stadium; Referee: Alper Ulusoy

26 August 2017 3	Beşiktaş	2–1	Bursaspor	Istanbul
19:45 TRT (UTC+3)	Adriano (yellow card) 8'; Tošić 18'; Hutchinson 64'; Beck (yellow card) 86'	Report	Delarge 23'; Yardımcı (yellow card) 36'; Agu (yellow card) 68'; Ekoko (yellow card) 90+4'	Stadium: Vodafone Park; Referee: Mete Kalkavan

9 September 2017 4	Kardemir Karabükspor	0–1	Beşiktaş	Karabük
17:00 TRT (UTC+3)	Torje (yellow card) 56'; Yatabaré (yellow card) 57'; Nounkeu (yellow card) 58'	Report	Tošić (yellow card) 5' (yellow-red card) 68'; Babel 78'; Uysal (yellow card) 86'; Erkin (yellow card) 89'	Stadium: Dr. Necmettin Şeyhoğlu Stadium; Referee: Ali Palabıyık

18 September 2017 5	Beşiktaş	2–0	Konyaspor	Istanbul
20:00 TRT (UTC+3)	Tosun 10'; Medel (yellow card) 42'; Quaresma 66'; Negredo (yellow card) 70'	Report	Bourabia (yellow card) 32'; Öztorun (yellow card) 37'	Stadium: Vodafone Park; Referee: Serkan Çınar

23 September 2017 6	Fenerbahçe	2–1	Beşiktaş	Istanbul
19:30 TRT (UTC+3)	Giuliano 20' (pen.); Janssen (yellow card) 23', (goal) 86' (pen.); Ekici (yellow card) 30'; Neto (red card) 45'; Potuk (yellow card) 77'; Köybaşı (red card) 88'; Souza (yellow card) 90+5'	Report	Özyakup (yellow card) 23' (yellow-red card) 90+6'; Hutchinson (yellow card) 36' (yellow-red card) 85'; Quaresma (yellow card) 41' (yellow-red card) 43'; Erkin (yellow card) 44'; Medel (yellow card) 77'; Tošić (yellow card) 78'; Babel 87', (yellow card) 90+3'; Negredo (yellow card) 90+5'	Stadium: Ülker Stadium; Referee: Ali Palabıyık

1 October 2017 7	Beşiktaş	2–2	Trabzonspor	Istanbul
19:30 TRT (UTC+3)	Talisca 13'; Medel (yellow card) 26'; Erkin (yellow card) 44'; Lens 58'; Arslan (yellow card) 71'; Babel (yellow card) 90+1'	Report	Şahan 20'; Yılmaz (yellow card) 29'; Hubočan (yellow card) 36'; Yokuşlu (yellow card) 39'; Onazi (yellow card) 55'; Rodallega 80'	Stadium: Vodafone Park; Referee: Fırat Aydınus

13 October 2017 8	Gençlerbirliği	2–1	Beşiktaş	Ankara
20:00 TRT (UTC+3)	Muriqi 16', (yellow card) 45'; Palitsevich (yellow card) 28'; Šćekić 73'; Yavru (yellow card) 90+5'	Report	Babel (red card) 48'; Tosun 87' (pen.)	Stadium: Ankara 19 Mayıs Stadium; Referee: Halis Özkahya

23 October 2017 9	Beşiktaş	1–1	İstanbul Başakşehir	Istanbul
20:00 TRT (UTC+3)	Talisca (yellow card) 6'; Tosun (yellow card) 86'; Özyakup (yellow card) 86'; Erkin (yellow card) 87'; Quaresma (yellow card) 90+1'; Tošić 90+2'	Report	Elia (yellow card) 33'; Júnior Caiçara (yellow card) 57'; Frei 89'	Stadium: Vodafone Park; Referee: Mete Kalkavan

28 October 2017 10	Alanyaspor	1–2	Beşiktaş	Alanya
19:30 TRT (UTC+3)	Welinton 26', (yellow card) 52'; Gassama (yellow card) 57'; Tzavellas (yellow card) 78'	Report	Tosun 8'; Pepe (yellow card) 78'; Negredo 87'	Stadium: Bahçeşehir Okulları Stadium; Referee: Yasar Kemal Ugurlu

5 November 2017 11	Göztepe	1–3	Beşiktaş	İzmir
19:30 TRT (UTC+3)	Ghilas 66'; Schwechlen (red card) 86'; Şişmanoğlu (yellow card) 89'	Report	Talisca 7'; Babel 47'; Tosun 53'; Pepe (yellow card) 75'	Stadium: Doğanlar Stadium; Referee: Hüseyin Göçek

17 November 2017 12	Beşiktaş	0–0	Akhisar Belediyespor	Istanbul
20:00 TRT (UTC+3)	Quaresma (penalty missed) 11'; Tošić (yellow card) 47'; Hutchinson (yellow card) 62'; Babel (yellow card) 78'; Medel (yellow card) 79'	Report	Keleş (yellow card) 10'; Paulo Henrique (yellow card) 76' (red card) 79'; Öztürk (yellow card) 81'; Hora (yellow card) 88'; Lukač (yellow card) 90+6'	Stadium: Vodafone Park; Referee: Serkan Çınar

25 November 2017 13	Yeni Malatyaspor	0–0	Beşiktaş	Malatya
15:30 TRT (UTC+3)	Okechukwu (yellow card) 49'	Report	Mitrović (yellow card) 90+3'	Stadium: Malatya Arena; Referee: Bülent Yıldırım

2 December 2017 14	Beşiktaş	3–0	Galatasaray	Istanbul
18:30 TRT (UTC+3)	Pepe (yellow card) 25'; Tosun 46', (yellow card) 61'; Arslan (yellow card) 53'; Tošić 70'; Negredo 90+1'	Report	Feghouli (yellow card) 35'; Fernando (yellow card) 49'; Gomis (yellow card) 65'	Stadium: Vodafone Park; Referee: Fırat Aydınus

10 December 2017 15	Kayserispor	1–1	Beşiktaş	Kayseri
18:30 TRT (UTC+3)	Bulut 31', (yellow card) 45+2'; Kana-Biyik (yellow card) 45+3'; Lopes (yellow card) 45+4' (yellow-red card) 49'; Lung (yellow card) 87'	Report	Tosun 45+3' (pen.); Talisca (yellow card) 84'	Stadium: Kadir Has Stadium; Referee: Yaşar Kemal Uğurlu

17 December 2017 16	Beşiktaş	5–1	Osmanlıspor	Istanbul
19:30 TRT (UTC+3)	Babel 32', 43', 52'; Negredo 75'; Erkin (yellow card) 85'; Tosun 87'	Report	Lawal (yellow card) 7'; Gürler (yellow card) 25', (goal) 90+2'; Çağıran (yellow card) 63'	Stadium: Vodafone Park; Referee: Halil Umut Meler

23 December 2017 17	Sivasspor	2–1	Beşiktaş	Sivas
15:30 TRT (UTC+3)	Rybalka 5'; Cyriac 83'; Yandaş (yellow card) 86'	Report	Negredo 26' (pen.)	Stadium: New Sivas 4 Eylül Stadium; Referee: Cüneyt Çakır

21 January 2018 18	Antalyaspor	1–2	Beşiktaş	Antalya
19:00 TRT (UTC+3)	Charles 8', (yellow card) 72'; Danilo (yellow card) 57'	Report	Talisca 30', 54'; Erkin (yellow card) 72'	Stadium: Antalya Stadyumu; Referee: Halis Özkahya

26 January 2018 19	Beşiktaş	2–1	Kasımpaşa	Istanbul
20:00 TRT (UTC+3)	Talisca 18', 25'; Adriano (yellow card) 22'; Babel (yellow card) 45'; Medel (yellow card) 88'	Report	Pavelka (yellow card) 24'; Popov (yellow card) 53'; Trézéguet 72'	Stadium: Vodafone Park; Referee: Hüseyin Göçek

2 February 2018 20	Bursaspor	2–2	Beşiktaş	Bursa
20:00 TRT (UTC+3)	Abdullahi (yellow card) 27'; Delarge (yellow card) 30', (goal) 45+2'; Negredo 37' (o.g.); Ekoko (yellow card) 85'; Behich (yellow card) 90+3'	Report	Adriano 13'; Medel (yellow card) 34'; Quaresma (yellow card) 45+4'; Negredo 90+2'	Stadium: Timsah Arena; Referee: Halil Umut Meler

10 February 2018 21	Beşiktaş	5–0	Kardemir Karabükspor	Istanbul
19:00 TRT (UTC+3)	Pepe 14'; Talisca 27', 83'; Özyakup (yellow card) 45'; Vágner Love 59', 90+2'; Hutchinson (yellow card) 68'; Adriano (yellow card) 78'	Report	Çelik (yellow card) 37'	Stadium: Vodafone Park; Referee: Bülent Yıldırım

16 February 2018 22	Konyaspor	1–1	Beşiktaş	Konya
20:00 TRT (UTC+3)	Filipović (yellow card) 19'; Turan (yellow card) 39'; Milošević (yellow card) 44'; Jahović 60'	Report	Hutchinson 27'; Pepe (yellow card) 39'; Vágner Love (yellow card) 45'; Talisca (yellow card) 52'; Vida (yellow card) 80'; Medel (yellow card) 90+1'; Erkin (yellow card) 90+7'	Stadium: Konya Büyükşehir Stadium; Referee: Alper Ulusoy

25 February 2018 23	Beşiktaş	3–1	Fenerbahçe	Istanbul
19:00 TRT (UTC+3)	Vida (yellow card) 39', (goal) 49'; Arslan (yellow card) 50'; Quaresma 77', 90+4', (yellow card) 90+1'	Report	Fernandão 8'; Isla (yellow card) 33'; Özbayraklı (yellow card) 38'	Stadium: Vodafone Park; Referee: Cüneyt Çakır

5 March 2018 24	Trabzonspor	0–2	Beşiktaş	Trabzon
20:00 TRT (UTC+3)	Hubočan (yellow card) 27'	Report	Tošić (yellow card) 1'; Lens (yellow card) 44'; Babel 71', 78'	Stadium: Şenol Güneş Stadium; Referee: Halis Özkahya

10 March 2018 25	Beşiktaş	1–0	Gençlerbirliği	Istanbul
19:00 TRT (UTC+3)	Talisca 53', (yellow card) 54'; Tošić (yellow card) 57'; Hutchinson (yellow card) 60'	Report	Sessègnon (yellow card) 37'; Uludağ (yellow card) 41'	Stadium: Vodafone Park; Referee: Mustafa Öğretmenoğlu

18 March 2018 26	İstanbul Başakşehir	1–0	Beşiktaş	Istanbul
19:00 TRT (UTC+3)	Elia 28', (yellow card) 44'; Júnior Caiçara (yellow card) 31' (yellow-red card) 62'; Clichy (yellow card) 61'; Adebayor (yellow card) 79'	Report	Medel (yellow card) 21'; Babel (yellow card) 45+2'; Adriano (yellow card) 70'; Tošić (yellow card) 72'	Stadium: Fatih Terim Stadium; Referee: Halil Umut Meler

31 March 2018 27	Beşiktaş	1–0	Alanyaspor	Istanbul
19:00 TRT (UTC+3)	Talisca 29'; Arslan (yellow card) 34'; Hutchinson (yellow card) 53'; Özyakup (yellow card) 70'; Uysal (yellow card) 90+2'; Vágner Love (yellow card) 90+3'	Report	Welinton (yellow card) 72'; Sackey (yellow card) 89'	Stadium: Vodafone Park; Referee: Barış Şimşek

7 April 2018 28	Beşiktaş	5–1	Göztepe	Istanbul
19:00 TRT (UTC+3)	Talisca 19'; Medel 26'; Tošić 64'; Larin 86'; Babel 87'; Pektemek (yellow card) 90+1'	Report	Ba (yellow card) 17'; Schwechlen (yellow card) 42'; Kayhan (yellow card) 56'; Akbunar 71'; Rotman (yellow card) 78' (yellow-red card) 78'; Bingöl (yellow card) 90+2'	Stadium: Vodafone Park; Referee: Ümit Öztürk

13 April 2018 29	Akhisar Belediyespor	0–3	Beşiktaş	Akhisar
20:00 TRT (UTC+3)		Report	Babel 2', 47'; Negredo 20', (yellow card) 49'	Stadium: Spor Toto Akhisar Stadium; Referee: Hüseyin Göçek

22 April 2018 30	Beşiktaş	3–1	Yeni Malatyaspor	Istanbul
19:00 TRT (UTC+3)	Negredo 13'; Talisca 81'; Quaresma 88'	Report	Pereira 33'; Yıldırım (yellow card) 42'; Çiftpınar (yellow card) 87'	Stadium: Vodafone Park; Referee: Halis Özkahya

29 April 2018 31	Galatasaray	2–0	Beşiktaş	Istanbul
19:00 TRT (UTC+3)	Belhanda (yellow card) 4'; Fernando 23', (yellow card) 90+2'; Gomis (penalty missed) 66'; Rodrigues 70'	Report	Adriano (yellow card) 45'; Tošić (red card) 65'; Talisca (yellow card) 76'	Stadium: Türk Telekom Stadium; Referee: Fırat Aydınus

7 May 2018 32	Beşiktaş	2–0	Kayserispor	Istanbul
20:00 TRT (UTC+3)	Tošić (yellow card) 20' (yellow-red card) 61', (goal) 31'; Adriano 45'	Report	Çinaz (yellow card) 26'; Badji (yellow card) 30'; Bulut (yellow card) 85' (yellow-red card) 90'	Stadium: Vodafone Park; Referee: Barış Şimşek

13 May 2018 33	Osmanlıspor	2–3	Beşiktaş	Ankara
19:00 TRT (UTC+3)	Gürler 6', 56'	Report	Karaer 47' (o.g.); Pektemek 50'; Vida (yellow card) 61'; Vágner Love 79'	Stadium: Osmanlı Stadyumu; Referee: Halis Özkahya

19 May 2018 34	Beşiktaş	5–1	Sivasspor	Istanbul
19:00 TRT (UTC+3)	Talisca 29'; Larin (yellow card) 45', (goal) 50', 74', 76'; Medel (yellow card) 55'; Babel 86'; Vida (yellow card) 90+3'	Report	Robinho (yellow card) 48'; Arslan 54'; N'Dinga (yellow card) 65' (yellow-red card) 66'; Kılınç (yellow card) 71'	Stadium: Vodafone Park; Referee: Bülent Yıldırım

=== Turkish Cup ===
==== Fifth round ====
28 November 2017 First leg	Beşiktaş	9–0	Manisaspor	Istanbul
13:30 TRT (UTC+3)	Negredo 15', 68', 79', 85'; Lens 24', 43', 71'; Çınar 34'; Arslan (yellow card) 64'; Pektemek 86'	Report		Stadium: Vodafone Park; Referee: Bahattin Şimşek

12 December 2017 Second leg	Manisaspor	1–1 (1–10 agg.)	Beşiktaş	Manisa
20:00 TRT (UTC+3)	Fındık (yellow card) 23'; Méyé 53'	Report	Özbiliz 15'; Çınar (yellow card) 23'; Apardı (yellow card) 58'; Çelebi (yellow card) 67'; Talisca (yellow card) 87'; Erkin (yellow card) 90+2'	Stadium: Manisa 19 Mayıs Stadium; Referee: Sarper Saka

==== Round of 16 ====
28 December 2017 First leg	Beşiktaş	4–1	Osmanlıspor	Istanbul
20:30 TRT (UTC+3)	Vršajević 15' (o.g.); Negredo 35'; Tosun 50' (yellow card) 53'; Gönül (yellow card) 90+1'; Quaresma 90+4'	Report	Kılıç (yellow card) 33'; Doukara 72'; Karaer (red card) 89'	Stadium: Vodafone Park; Referee: Alper Ulusoy

17 January 2018 Second leg	Osmanlıspor	2–1 (3–5 agg.)	Beşiktaş	Ankara
20:30 TRT (UTC+3)	Cikalleshi 86', 88' (pen.)	Report	Pektemek 83'; Mitrović (yellow card) 87'	Stadium: Osmanlı Stadyumu; Referee: Koray Gençerler

==== Quarter-finals ====
30 January 2018 First leg	Beşiktaş	3–1	Gençlerbirliği	Istanbul
20:30 TRT (UTC+3)	Pektemek 21'; Negredo 74' (pen.); Erkin (yellow card) 76'; Talisca 79'; Babel (yellow card) 90+2'	Report	Luccas Claro (yellow card) 18'; Yılmaz 52'; Palitsevich (yellow card) 77'; Khalili (yellow card) 87'; Oğuz (yellow card) 90+1'	Stadium: Vodafone Park; Referee: Serkan Çınar

6 February 2018 Second leg	Gençlerbirliği	0–1 (1–4 agg.)	Beşiktaş	Ankara
20:30 TRT (UTC+3)		Report	Pektemek 25'; Uysal (yellow card) 35' (yellow-red card) 71'; Arslan (yellow card) 63'	Stadium: Ankara 19 Mayıs Stadium; Referee: Özgür Yankaya

==== Semi-finals ====
1 March 2018 First leg	Beşiktaş	2–2	Fenerbahçe	Istanbul
20:30 TRT (UTC+3)	Negredo 14'; Medel (yellow card) 45+1'; Quaresma (red card) 52'; Pepe (yellow card) 59'; Talisca 82'; Tošić (yellow card) 90+1'	Report	Soldado 17'; Potuk (yellow card) 39' (yellow-red card) 44'; Özbayraklı 45+2'; Demirel (yellow card) 45+2' (yellow-red card) 76'; Ekici (yellow card) 54'	Stadium: Vodafone Park; Referee: Fırat Aydınus

19 April 2018 Second leg	Fenerbahçe	0–0 (– agg.)	Beşiktaş	Istanbul
20:30 TRT (UTC+3)	Chahechouhe (yellow card) 30'	Report	Pepe (red card) 30'; Erkin (yellow card) 30'; Talisca (yellow card) 45'	Stadium: Şükrü Saracoğlu Stadium; Referee: Mete Kalkavan
Note: Match suspended during the second half after Beşiktaş manager Şenol Güneş struck by an object thrown from the stands.

3 May 2018 Second leg	Fenerbahçe	3–0 (Walkover) (5–2 agg.)	Beşiktaş	Istanbul
20:30 TRT (UTC+3)				Stadium: Şükrü Saracoğlu Stadium
Note: Fenerbahçe awarded the Tie after Beşiktaş refused to return to the field after an incident in the original game where coach Şenol Güneş was struck on the head with an object, forcing the original tie to be abandoned. the TFF ordered the remaining 32 minutes to be played behind closed doors, however Beşiktaş refused to travel and after a fail appeal, did not appear for the remaining tie. As a result Beşiktaş were punished by forfeiting all Prize Money from the competition to the point, and barred from entering the 2018-19 contest

=== UEFA Champions League ===
==== Group stage ====
Pos	Team	Pld	W	D	L	GF	GA	GD	Pts	Qualification	BES	POR	RBL	MON
1	(Turkey) Beşiktaş	6	4	2	0	11	5	+6	14	Advance to knockout phase	—	1–1	2–0	1–1
2	(Portugal) Porto	6	3	1	2	15	10	+5	10	Advance to knockout phase	1–3	—	3–1	5–2
3	(Germany) RB Leipzig	6	2	1	3	10	11	−1	7	Transfer to Europa League	1–2	3–2	—	1–1
4	(France) Monaco	6	0	2	4	6	16	−10	2		1–2	0–3	1–4	—

Source: UEFA

13 September 2017 1	Porto (Portugal)	1–3	(Turkey) Beşiktaş	Porto, Portugal
21:45 TRT (UTC+3)	R. Pereira (yellow card) 10'; Tošić 21' (o.g.); André (yellow card) 81'	Report	Talisca 13'; Tosun 28'; Erkin (yellow card) 67'; Babel 86'	Stadium: Estádio do Dragão; Attendance: 42,429; Referee: Anthony Taylor (England)

26 September 2017 2	Beşiktaş (Turkey)	2–0	(Germany) RB Leipzig	Istanbul, Turkey
21:45 TRT (UTC+3)	Babel 11'; Erkin (yellow card) 17'; Talisca 43'; Fabri (yellow card) 87'	Report	Orban (yellow card) 8'; Keïta (yellow card) 15'	Stadium: Vodafone Park; Attendance: 36,641; Referee: Sergei Karasev (Russia)

17 October 2017 3	Monaco (France)	1–2	(Turkey) Beşiktaş	Monaco
21:45 TRT (UTC+3)	Falcao 30'; Keita (yellow card) 49'	Report	Pepe (yellow card) 16'; Tosun 34', 54'; Arslan (yellow card) 36'	Stadium: Stade Louis II; Attendance: 7,403; Referee: Milorad Mažić (Serbia)

1 November 2017 4	Beşiktaş (Turkey)	1–1	(France) Monaco	Istanbul, Turkey
20:00 TRT (UTC+3)	Arslan (yellow card) 25'; Tosun 54' (pen.); Tošić (yellow card) 65'; Quaresma (yellow card) 88'; Medel (yellow card) 90+1'	Report	Lopes (yellow card) 27', (goal) 45+1'; Jorge (yellow card) 53'; Diakhaby (yellow card) 90+3'	Stadium: Vodafone Park; Attendance: 39,346; Referee: Paolo Tagliavento (Italy)

21 November 2017 5	Beşiktaş (Turkey)	1–1	(Portugal) Porto	Istanbul, Turkey
20:00 TRT (UTC+3)	Talisca 41', (yellow card) 43'; Gönül (yellow card) 65'	Report	Oliveira (yellow card) 9'; M. Pereira (yellow card) 22'; Felipe 29'	Stadium: Vodafone Park; Attendance: 36,919; Referee: Antonio Mateu Lahoz (Spain)

6 December 2017 6	RB Leipzig (Germany)	1–2	(Turkey) Beşiktaş	Leipzig, Germany
22:45 TRT (UTC+3)	Ilsanker (yellow card) 54' (yellow-red card) 82'; Keïta 87'	Report	Negredo 10' (pen.); Adriano (yellow card) 75'; Lens (yellow card) 79'; Özyakup (yellow card) 83'; Talisca 90', (yellow card) 90+1'	Stadium: Red Bull Arena; Attendance: 42,558; Referee: Viktor Kassai (Hungary)

==== Knockout phase ====
===== Round of 16 =====
20 February 2018 First leg	Bayern Munich (Germany)	5–0	(Turkey) Beşiktaş	Munich, Germany
22:45 TRT (UTC+3)	Lewandowski (yellow card) 38', (goal) 79', 88'; Müller 43', 66'; Coman 53'	Report	Vida (red card) 16'; Quaresma (yellow card) 33'; Pepe (yellow card) 62'; Tošić (yellow card) 90+3'	Stadium: Allianz Arena; Attendance: 70,000; Referee: Ovidiu Hațegan (Romania)

14 March 2018 Second leg	Beşiktaş (Turkey)	1–3 (1–8 agg.)	(Germany) Bayern Munich	Istanbul, Turkey
19:00 TRT (UTC+3)	Vágner Love 59'; Hutchinson; Özyakup (yellow card) 71'	Report	Thiago 18'; Hummels (yellow card) 37'; Boateng (yellow card) 42'; Gönül 46' (o.g.); Rafinha (yellow card) 63'; Wagner 84'	Stadium: Vodafone Park; Attendance: 36,885; Referee: Michael Oliver (England)

== Squad statistics ==
As of match played 19 May 2018

=== Appearances and goals ===
No.	Pos	Nat	Player	Total		Süper Lig		Turkish Cup		Super Cup		Champions League	
No.	Pos	Nat	Player	Apps	Goals	Apps	Goals	Apps	Goals	Apps	Goals	Apps	Goals
1	GK	(Spain) ESP	Fabri	41	0	34	0	0	0	1	0	6	0
3	DF	(Brazil) BRA	Adriano	36	2	25	2	1+3	0	1	0	5+1	0
5	DF	(Portugal) POR	Pepe	33	2	23	2	3	0	1	0	6	0
6	DF	(Serbia) SRB	Duško Tošić	34	5	25	5	1	0	1	0	6+1	0
7	MF	(Portugal) POR	Ricardo Quaresma	36	5	23+3	4	0+2	1	1	0	7	0
8	MF	(Netherlands) NED	Ryan Babel	43	15	30+2	13	3	0	1	0	6+1	2
9	FW	(Spain) ESP	Álvaro Negredo	41	14	17+14	7	4	6	0+1	0	1+4	1
10	MF	(Turkey) TUR	Oğuzhan Özyakup	35	0	17+7	0	2+1	0	1	0	5+2	0
11	FW	(Turkey) TUR	Mustafa Pektemek	15	5	0+8	1	5	4	0	0	2	0
12	DF	(Chile) CHI	Gary Medel	38	1	22+3	1	5	0	0	0	4+4	0
13	MF	(Canada) CAN	Atiba Hutchinson	34	2	24+1	2	1	0	1	0	6+1	0
14	DF	(Turkey) TUR	Fatih Aksoy	6	0	0+3	0	2+1	0	0	0	0	0
17	MF	(Netherlands) NED	Jeremain Lens	30	4	13+11	1	4	3	0	0	2	0
18	MF	(Germany) GER	Tolgay Arslan	42	0	20+9	0	4+2	0	1	0	4+2	0
20	MF	(Turkey) TUR	Necip Uysal	20	0	6+7	0	3	0	0	0	2+2	0
24	DF	(Croatia) CRO	Domagoj Vida	16	1	7+6	1	2	0	0	0	1	0
28	FW	(Turkey) TUR	Mustafa Apardı	1	0	0	0	0+1	0	0	0	0	0
29	GK	(Turkey) TUR	Tolga Zengin	7	0	0	0	5	0	0	0	2	0
30	FW	(Brazil) BRA	Vágner Love	13	4	4+6	3	1	0	0	0	2	1
41	DF	(Turkey) TUR	Alpay Çelebi	2	0	0	0	1+1	0	0	0	0	0
55	MF	(Turkey) TUR	Gökhan Töre	1	0	0+1	0	0	0	0	0	0	0
60	DF	(Austria) AUT	Abdullah Çelik	1	0	0	0	0+1	0	0	0	0	0
77	DF	(Turkey) TUR	Gökhan Gönül	33	0	21+4	0	4	0	0	0	3+1	0
88	DF	(Turkey) TUR	Caner Erkin	33	0	15+6	0	5	0	0+1	0	6	0
94	MF	(Brazil) BRA	Talisca	45	18	31+2	14	1+3	1	0	0	6+2	3
95	FW	(Canada) CAN	Cyle Larin	4	4	2+2	4	0	0	0	0	0	0
97	GK	(Turkey) TUR	Utku Yuvakuran	1	0	0	0	1	0	0	0	0	0
Players out on loan:
2	DF	(Croatia) CRO	Matej Mitrović	8	0	1+1	0	3+1	0	0	0	1+1	0
15	MF	(Turkey) TUR	Orkan Çınar	5	1	0	0	3+1	1	0	0	0+1	0
22	MF	(Armenia) ARM	Aras Özbiliz	1	1	0	0	1	1	0	0	0	0
Players who left Beşiktaş during the season:
23	FW	(Turkey) TUR	Cenk Tosun	24	14	12+4	8	1	1	1	1	5+1	4
32	DF	(Germany) GER	Andreas Beck	4	0	2+1	0	0	0	1	0	0	0

=== Goal scorers ===
Place	Position	Nation	Number	Name	Süper Lig	Turkish Cup	Super Cup	Champions League	Total
1	MF	(Brazil)	94	Talisca	14	1	0	4	19
2	MF	(Netherlands)	8	Ryan Babel	13	0	0	2	15
3	FW	(Turkey)	23	Cenk Tosun	8	1	1	4	14
3	FW	(Spain)	9	Álvaro Negredo	7	6	0	1	14
5	DF	(Serbia)	6	Duško Tošić	5	0	0	0	5
5	MF	(Portugal)	7	Ricardo Quaresma	4	1	0	0	5
5	FW	(Turkey)	11	Mustafa Pektemek	1	4	0	0	5
8	FW	(Canada)	95	Cyle Larin	4	0	0	0	4
8	FW	(Brazil)	30	Vágner Love	3	0	0	1	4
8	MF	(Netherlands)	17	Jeremain Lens	1	3	0	0	4
11	DF	(Portugal)	5	Pepe	2	0	0	0	2
11	MF	(Canada)	13	Atiba Hutchinson	2	0	0	0	2
11	DF	(Brazil)	3	Adriano	2	0	0	0	2
11				Own goal	1	1	0	0	2
15	DF	(Croatia)	24	Domagoj Vida	1	0	0	0	1
15	DF	(Chile)	12	Gary Medel	1	0	0	0	1
15	MF	(Turkey)	15	Orkan Çınar	0	1	0	0	1
15	MF	(Armenia)	22	Aras Özbiliz	0	1	0	0	1
				TOTALS	69	19	1	12	101

=== Disciplinary record ===
Number	Nation	Position	Name	Süper Lig		Turkish Cup		Super Cup		Champions League		Total	
Number	Nation	Position	Name	Yellow card	Red card	Yellow card	Red card	Yellow card	Red card	Yellow card	Red card	Yellow card	Red card
1	(Spain)	GK	Fabri	0	0	0	0	0	0	1	0	1	0
3	(Brazil)	DF	Adriano	5	0	0	0	1	0	1	0	6	0
5	(Portugal)	DF	Pepe	5	0	0	0	0	0	2	0	7	0
6	(Serbia)	DF	Duško Tošić	11	3	0	0	0	0	2	0	13	3
7	(Portugal)	MF	Ricardo Quaresma	5	1	0	0	0	0	2	0	7	1
8	(Netherlands)	MF	Ryan Babel	5	1	1	0	0	0	0	0	6	1
9	(Spain)	FW	Álvaro Negredo	3	0	0	0	0	0	0	0	3	0
10	(Turkey)	MF	Oğuzhan Özyakup	6	1	0	0	0	0	2	0	8	1
11	(Turkey)	FW	Mustafa Pektemek	1	0	0	0	0	0	0	0	1	0
12	(Chile)	DF	Gary Medel	9	0	0	0	0	0	1	0	10	0
13	(Canada)	MF	Atiba Hutchinson	6	1	0	0	0	0	1	0	7	1
17	(Netherlands)	MF	Jeremain Lens	1	0	0	0	0	0	1	0	2	0
18	(Germany)	MF	Tolgay Arslan	4	0	2	0	0	0	2	0	8	0
20	(Turkey)	DF	Necip Uysal	2	0	2	1	0	0	0	0	4	1
24	(Croatia)	DF	Domagoj Vida	4	0	0	0	0	0	0	1	4	1
28	(Turkey)	FW	Mustafa Apardı	0	0	1	0	0	0	0	0	1	0
30	(Brazil)	FW	Vágner Love	2	0	0	0	0	0	0	0	2	0
32	(Germany)	DF	Andreas Beck	2	0	0	0	0	0	0	0	2	0
41	(Turkey)	DF	Alpay Çelebi	0	0	1	0	0	0	0	0	1	0
77	(Turkey)	DF	Gökhan Gönül	0	0	1	0	0	0	1	0	2	0
88	(Turkey)	DF	Caner Erkin	7	0	2	0	0	0	2	0	11	0
94	(Brazil)	MF	Talisca	6	0	1	0	0	0	2	0	9	0
95	(Canada)	FW	Cyle Larin	1	0	0	0	0	0	0	0	1	0
Players away on loan:
2	(Croatia)	DF	Matej Mitrović	1	0	1	0	0	0	0	0	2	0
15	(Turkey)	MF	Orkan Çınar	0	0	1	0	0	0	0	0	1	0
Players who left Beşiktaş during the season:
23	(Turkey)	FW	Cenk Tosun	2	0	1	0	0	0	0	0	3	0
			TOTALS	87	7	14	1	1	0	20	1	122	9
