= 2016–17 Beşiktaş J.K. season =

Beşiktaş
2016–17 season
- President: Fikret Orman
- Head coach: Şenol Güneş
- Stadium: Vodafone Arena
- Süper Lig: 1st
- Turkish Cup: Round of 16 (vs. Fenerbahçe)
- UEFA Champions League: Group stage
- UEFA Europa League: Quarter-finals (vs. Lyon)
- Top goalscorer: League: Cenk Tosun (20 goals); All: Cenk Tosun (24 goals)
- Average home league attendance: 30,193
Home colours	Away colours	Third colours

The 2016–17 Beşiktaş J.K. season was the club's 113th year since its foundation, 95th season of competitive football and the club's 58th season contesting the Süper Lig, the top division of Turkish football. Beşiktaş were the defending champions of the Süper Lig, having finished first in 2015–16. The 2016–17 season lasted from 30 June 2016 to 30 June 2017. Beşiktaş officially began their season on 8 July. The 41,903-capacity Vodafone Arena served as the home ground of the club.

The club began its competitive season with the 2016 Turkish Super Cup played against Galatasaray on 13 August 2016, in which they lost 4–1 after penalty shoot-out. The club competed in the UEFA Champions League directly in the group stages, as well as the Turkish Cup.

== Season events ==
The club's official football kit manufacturer was Adidas. The 2016–17 kit designs were unveiled on 11 June 2016. The sponsors on the football kit are Vodafone on the chest, Beko on the back, Kalde on the sleeves and Coca-Cola on the shorts.

=== Sponsorship ===
As of 11 September 2016

Name	Type of Sponsorship
Vodafone	Main Sponsor
Adidas	Technical Sponsor
Beko	Official Sponsor
Kalde	Official Sponsor
Integral Forex	Official Sponsor
Mogaz	Official Sponsor

Name	Type of Sponsorship
RMK Marine	Official Sponsor
Acıbadem Sağlık Grubu	Official Sponsor
Fleetcorp	Official Sponsor
Turkish Airlines	Official Sponsor
Sarar	Official Sponsor
Coca-Cola	Official Sponsor

Name	Type of Sponsorship
Diversey	Official Sponsor
Yurtiçi Kargo	Official Sponsor
GNC	Official Supplier
Klinik 32	Official Sponsor
Gloria Hotels & Resorts	Official Sponsor
Acıbadem Mobil	Official Sponsor

Name	Type of Sponsorship
Doğuş Otomotiv	Official Sponsor
Passolig	Official Sponsor
Sırma	Official Sponsor
Majorworx	Official Sponsor
Gen3Creative	Official Sponsor

== Squad ==
As of match played 3 June 2017

No.	Name	Nationality	Position	Date of birth (Age (Note: Age as of the end of the season))	Signed from	Signed In	Apps.	Goals
Goalkeepers
1	Fabricio	(Spain)	GK	31 December 1987 (aged 29)	Deportivo La Coruña	2016	44	0
29	Tolga Zengin (captain)	(Turkey)	GK	10 October 1983 (aged 33)	Trabzonspor	2013	112	0
97	Utku Yuvakuran	(Turkey)	GK	2 November 1997 (aged 19)	Beylerbeyi	2016	2	0
Defenders
2	Matej Mitrović	(Croatia)	DF	10 November 1993 (aged 23)	Rijeka	2017	14	0
3	Adriano	(Brazil)	DF	26 October 1984 (aged 32)	Barcelona	2016	45	2
6	Duško Tošić	(Serbia)	DF	19 January 1985 (aged 32)	Gençlerbirliği	2015	64	2
14	Fatih Aksoy	(Turkey)	DF	6 November 1997 (aged 19)	Academy	2016	6	0
30	Marcelo	(Brazil)	DF	20 May 1987 (aged 30)	Hannover 96	2016	61	5
32	Andreas Beck	(Germany)	DF	13 March 1987 (aged 30)	1899 Hoffenheim	2015	76	1
33	Atınç Nukan	(Turkey)	DF	20 July 1993 (aged 23)	loan from RB Leipzig	2016	37	2
44	Rhodolfo	(Brazil)	DF	11 August 1986 (aged 30)	Grêmio	2015	37	2
77	Gökhan Gönül	(Turkey)	DF	4 January 1985 (aged 32)	Fenerbahçe	2016	38	1
88	Caner Erkin	(Turkey)	DF	4 October 1988 (aged 28)	loan from Internazionale	2017	11	0
	Ersan Gülüm	(Turkey)	DF	17 May 1987 (aged 30)	loan from Hebei China Fortune	2017	0	0
Midfielders
7	Ricardo Quaresma	(Portugal)	MF	26 September 1983 (aged 33)	Porto	2015	154	29
8	Veli Kavlak	(Austria)	MF	3 November 1988 (aged 28)	Rapid Wien	2011	152	8
13	Atiba Hutchinson	(Canada)	MF	8 February 1983 (aged 34)	PSV	2013	157	7
15	Oğuzhan Özyakup	(Turkey)	MF	23 September 1992 (aged 24)	Arsenal	2012	181	27
18	Tolgay Arslan	(Germany)	MF	16 August 1990 (aged 26)	Hamburger SV	2015	73	2
19	Oğuzhan Aydoğan	(Germany)	MF	4 February 1997 (aged 20)	Borussia Dortmund	2016	1	0
20	Necip Uysal	(Turkey)	MF	24 January 1991 (aged 26)	Academy	2009	254	5
22	Aras Özbiliz	(Armenia)	MF	9 March 1990 (aged 27)	Spartak Moscow	2016	4	0
49	Ryan Babel	(Netherlands)	MF	19 December 1986 (aged 30)	Deportivo La Coruña	2017	25	8
67	Muhammed Enes Durmuş	(Turkey)	MF	8 January 1997 (aged 20)	Academy	2015	9	0
70	Sedat Şahintürk	(Turkey)	MF	7 February 1996 (aged 21)	Academy	2016	2	0
80	Gökhan Inler	(Switzerland)	MF	27 June 1984 (aged 32)	Leicester City	2016	30	0
94	Talisca	(Brazil)	MF	1 February 1994 (aged 23)	loan from Benfica	2016	33	17
97	Eslem Öztürk	(Turkey)	MF	1 December 1997 (aged 19)	Academy	2014	6	0
	İbrahim Tekeli	(Turkey)	MF	24 May 1997 (aged 20)	Academy	2016	1	0
Strikers
9	Vincent Aboubakar	(Cameroon)	FW	22 January 1992 (aged 25)	loan from Porto	2016	38	19
17	Ömer Şişmanoğlu	(Turkey)	FW	1 August 1989 (aged 27)	Antalyaspor	2013	26	6
23	Cenk Tosun	(Turkey)	FW	7 June 1991 (aged 25)	Gaziantepspor	2014	118	50
50	Hamza Küçükköylü	(Turkey)	FW	10 June 1996 (aged 20)	Antalyaspor	2015	4	0
99	Demba Ba	(Senegal)	FW	25 May 1985 (aged 32)	loan from Shanghai Greenland Shenhua	2017	2	0
Players who left during the season
10	Olcay Şahan	(Turkey)	MF	26 May 1987 (aged 30)	1. FC Kaiserslautern	2012	178	35
21	Kerim Frei	(Turkey)	MF	19 November 1993 (aged 23)	Fulham	2013	109	13

=== On loan ===
Note: Flags indicate national team as defined under FIFA eligibility rules; some limited exceptions apply. Players may hold more than one non-FIFA nationality.

No.	Pos.	Nation	Player
—	GK	UKR	Denys Boyko (at Málaga)
—	DF	COL	Pedro Franco (at Millonarios)
—	DF	SWE	Alexander Milošević (at Darmstadt 98)

No.	Pos.	Nation	Player
—	MF	TUR	Gökhan Töre (at West Ham United)
—	FW	TUR	Mustafa Pektemek (at İstanbul Başakşehir)

== Transfers ==
=== In ===
Date	Position	Nationality	Name	From	Fee	Ref.
16 June 2016	DF	(Brazil)	Marcelo	Hannover 96	€2,000,000	
1 July 2016	DF	(Turkey)	Gökhan Gönül	Fenerbahçe	Undisclosed	
9 July 2016	GK	(Spain)	Fabricio	Deportivo La Coruña	Free	
16 July 2016	GK	(Turkey)	Utku Yuvakuran	Beylerbeyi	€200,000	
29 July 2016	DF	(Brazil)	Adriano	Barcelona	€600,000	
5 August 2016	MF	(Germany)	Oğuzhan Aydoğan	Borussia Dortmund	€150,000	
31 August 2016	MF	(Switzerland)	Gökhan Inler	Leicester City	Free	
1 January 2017	MF	(Netherlands)	Ryan Babel	Deportivo La Coruña		
6 January 2017	DF	(Croatia)	Matej Mitrović	Rijeka		

=== Out ===
Date	Position	Nationality	Name	To	Fee	Ref.
27 June 2016	DF	(Turkey)	Serdar Kurtuluş	Bursaspor	Free	
1 July 2016	GK	(Turkey)	Günay Güvenç	Göztepe	€75,000	
1 July 2016	DF	(Turkey)	Berat Çetinkaya	Valur	Free	
14 July 2016	FW	(Turkey)	Sinan Kurumuş	Valur	Free	
21 July 2016	DF	(Turkey)	İsmail Köybaşı	Fenerbahçe	Free	
27 July 2016	DF	(Spain)	Alexis	Alavés	€400,000	
17 August 2016	MF	(Argentina)	José Sosa	Milan	€7,500,000	
12 January 2017	MF	(Turkey)	Olcay Şahan	Trabzonspor	Undisclosed	
20 January 2017	MF	(Turkey)	Kerim Frei	Birmingham City	€2,500,000	

=== Loans in ===
Date from	Position	Nationality	Name	From	Date to	Ref.
24 August 2016	MF	(Brazil)	Talisca	Benfica	End of season	
27 August 2016	FW	(Cameroon)	Vincent Aboubakar	Porto	End of season	
30 August 2016	DF	(Turkey)	Caner Erkin	Internazionale	End of season	
30 August 2017	DF	(Turkey)	Atınç Nukan	RB Leipzig	End of season	
26 January 2017	DF	(Turkey)	Ersan Gülüm	Hebei China Fortune	End of season	
31 January 2017	FW	(Senegal)	Demba Ba	Shanghai Shenhua	End of season	

=== Loans out ===
Date from	Position	Nationality	Name	To	Date to	Ref.
1 July 2016	DF	(Colombia)	Pedro Franco	Millonarios	End of season	
11 July 2016	MF	(Turkey)	Gökhan Töre	West Ham United	End of season	
17 August 2016	DF	(Sweden)	Alexander Milošević	Darmstadt 98	End of season	
20 August 2016	FW	(Turkey)	Mustafa Pektemek	İstanbul Başakşehir	End of season	
31 August 2016	GK	(Ukraine)	Denys Boyko	Málaga	End of season	

== Friendlies ==
Beşiktaş started their season on 8 July 2016 at Nevzat Demir Facilities, Ataşehir district of Istanbul, where they remained until 19 July 2016. The team traveled to Leogang municipality, Salzburg, on 20 July for three friendly matches. On 22 July, a fourth friendly match was announced against Olympiacos, to be played at the Vodafone Arena on 7 August. On 27 July, the friendly match against 1899 Hoffenheim was cancelled in the 53rd minute due to weather conditions, with the final score ending 0–0.

Beşiktaş played another exhibition game against Gaziantepspor on 3 September, between matchday 2 and 3 of the Süper Lig.

22 July 2016 Friendly	Beşiktaş	1–1	Al-Hilal	Saalfelden, Austria
18:15 CEST	Tosun 4'	Report	Al-Qahtani 61'	Stadium: Saalfelden Stadium

27 July 2016 Friendly	Beşiktaş	0–0	1899 Hoffenheim	Leogang, Austria
TBD				Stadium: Steinbergstadion Leogang

30 July 2016 Friendly	Beşiktaş	3–0	Eibar	Leogang, Austria
18:15 CEST	Tosun 8', 57'; Arslan 60'	Report		Stadium: Steinbergstadion Leogang

4 August 2016 Friendly	Beşiktaş	4–0	Beylerbeyi	Istanbul
18:10 EEST	Özbiliz 3'; Şişmanoğlu 26', 52'; Pektemek 75'	Report		Stadium: Nevzat Demir Tesisleri

7 August 2016 Friendly	Beşiktaş	1–0	Olympiacos	Istanbul
19:00 EEST	Şişmanoğlu 58'			Stadium: Vodafone Arena

3 September 2016 Friendly	Beşiktaş	3–0	Gaziantepspor	Istanbul
18:10 EEST	Talisca 11'; Aboubakar 24'; Şişmanoğlu 68'	Report		Stadium: Vodafone Arena

== Competitions ==
=== Turkish Super Cup ===
13 August 2016 Final	Beşiktaş	1–1 (a.e.t.) (0–3 p)	Galatasaray	Selçuklu
20:45 EEST (UTC+3)	Beck (yellow card) 58'; Özyakup (yellow card) 87'; Uysal (yellow card) 99'; Chedjou 107' (o.g.)	Report	Ciğerci (yellow card) 77'; Balta 100'	Stadium: Torku Arena; Attendance: 33,700; Referee: Mete Kalkavan
	Penalties
	Özyakup (penalty missed); Tosun (penalty missed); Hutchinson (penalty missed)		İnan (penalty scored); Balta (penalty scored); Ciğerci (penalty scored)

=== Süper Lig ===
==== League table ====
Pos	Team	Pld	W	D	L	GF	GA	GD	Pts	Qualification or relegation
1	Beşiktaş (C)	34	23	8	3	73	30	+43	77	Qualification for the Champions League group stage
2	Başakşehir	34	21	10	3	63	28	+35	73	Qualification for the Champions League third qualifying round
3	Fenerbahçe	34	18	10	6	60	32	+28	64 (Note: Fenerbahçe ahead of Galatasaray on head-to-head points: Fenerbahçe 6 pts, Galatasaray 0 pts.)	Qualification for the Europa League third qualifying round
4	Galatasaray	34	20	4	10	65	40	+25	64	Qualification for the Europa League second qualifying round
5	Antalyaspor	34	17	7	10	47	40	+7	58	

Source: Süper Lig, Soccerway
Rules for classification: 1) Points; 2) Head-to-head points; 3) Head-to-head goal difference; 4) Head-to-head goals scored; 5) Goal difference; 6) Goals scored; 7) Play-off.
(C) Champions

==== Results summary ====
Overall								Home						Away					
Pld	W	D	L	GF	GA	GD	Pts	W	D	L	GF	GA	GD	W	D	L	GF	GA	GD
34	23	8	3	73	30	+43	77	13	4	0	44	15	+29	10	4	3	29	15	+14

Last updated: 3 June 2017.
Source: Soccerway

==== Results by matchday ====
Matchday	1	2	3	4	5	6	7	8	9	10	11	12	13	14	15	16	17	18	19	20	21	22	23	24	25	26	27	28	29	30	31	32	33	34
Ground	H	A	H	A	H	A	A	H	A	H	A	H	A	H	A	H	A	A	H	A	H	A	H	H	A	H	A	H	A	H	A	H	A	H
Result	W	D	W	W	D	W	W	W	D	W	W	D	D	W	L	W	W	W	W	L	W	W	W	D	D	W	W	W	L	D	W	W	W	W
Position	1	3	2	2	3	2	2	2	2	2	2	2	2	2	2	2	2	1	1	1	1	1	1	1	1	1	1	1	1	1	1	1	1	1

Updated to match(es) played on 3 June 2017. Source:
A = Away; H = Home; W = Win; D = Draw; L = Loss

==== Matches ====
20 August 2016 1	Beşiktaş	4–1	Alanyaspor	Istanbul
21:45 EEST (UTC+3)	Oğuzhan 6'; Şahan 42', (yellow card) 59'; Tosun 58' (pen.), 78'	Report	García (yellow card) 44'; Akbaba 90+4' (pen.)	Stadium: Vodafone Arena; Referee: Barış Şimşek

26 August 2016 2	Konyaspor	2–2	Beşiktaş	Konya
21:45 EEST (UTC+3)	Bajić 8', 59', (yellow card) 40'; Çamdalı (yellow card) 45+2'; Turan (yellow card) 45+6'; Şahiner (yellow card) 75'	Report	Tosun 14'; Uysal (yellow card) 30' (yellow-red card) 81'; Zengin (yellow card) 45+6'; Şahan 53'	Stadium: Torku Arena; Referee: Cüneyt Çakır

10 September 2016 3	Beşiktaş	3–1	Karabükspor	Istanbul
21:45 TRT (UTC+3)	Tosun 26'; Şişmanoğlu 30'; Erkin (yellow card) 32'; Tošić (yellow card) 57'; Öztakup 82' (pen.)	Report	Gülselam (yellow card) 21'; Başdaş (yellow card) 34'; Traoré 48', (yellow card) 81'; Nounkeu (yellow card) 72' (yellow-red card) 81'; Poko (yellow card) 75'	Stadium: Vodafone Arena; Referee: Serkan Çınar

18 September 2016 4	Akhisar Belediyespor	0–2	Beşiktaş	Manisa
20:00 TRT (UTC+3)	Bayram (yellow card) 45'; Kesimal (yellow card) 60'; Rodallega (yellow card) 85'	Report	Talisca 8'; Rodallega 45+2' (o.g.); Marcelo (yellow card) 52'; Gönül (yellow card) 59'; Tošić (yellow card) 90+3'	Stadium: 19 Mayıs Stadyumu; Referee: Bülent Yıldırım

24 September 2016 5	Beşiktaş	2–2	Galatasaray	Istanbul
20:00 TRT (UTC+3)	Quaresma (yellow card) 55'; Marcelo 73'; Tosun 78'; Tošić (yellow card) 90+3'	Report	Derdiyok 8'; Sneijder (yellow card) 22'; Bruma 44'; Ciğerci (yellow card) 65'; Muslera (yellow card) 83'	Stadium: Vodafone Arena; Referee: Ali Palabıyık

1 October 2016 6	Çaykur Rizespor	0–1	Beşiktaş	Rize
19:00 TRT (UTC+3)	Özek (yellow card) 12'	Report	Arslan (yellow card) 45+1'; Marcelo (yellow card) 49'; Quaresma (yellow card) 84'; Adriano 90+3', (yellow card) 90+4'	Stadium: Yeni Rize Şehir Stadı; Referee: Cüneyt Çakır

14 October 2016 7	Kayserispor	0–1	Beşiktaş	Kayseri
19:00 TRT (UTC+3)	Türüç (yellow card) 71'; Mabiala (yellow card) 45+1' (yellow-red card) 90+2'; Kana-Biyik (yellow card) 80'	Report	Hutchinson (yellow card) 15'; Şişmanoğlu 67'	Stadium: Kadir Has Stadium; Referee: Hüseyin Göçek

23 October 2016 8	Beşiktaş	3–0	Antalyaspor	Istanbul
19:00 TRT (UTC+3)	Hutchinson (yellow card) 3'; Aboubakar 45+1'; Marcelo (yellow card) 57'; Talisca 72', 89'	Report	Yıldırım (yellow card) 14'; Diego Ângelo (red card) 45+2'; Kadah (yellow card) 45+2'; Eto'o (yellow card) 45+3'; Chico (yellow card) 61'	Stadium: Vodafone Arena; Referee: Barış Şimşek

28 October 2016 9	Gençlerbirliği	1–1	Beşiktaş	Ankara
20:00 TRT (UTC+3)	Gürler 26'; Kahveci (yellow card) 70'; Palitsevich (yellow card) 90+1'; Şahin (yellow card) 90+3'	Report	Tošić (yellow card) 29'; Talisca 51'; Gönül (yellow card) 67'	Stadium: Ankara 19 Mayıs Stadium; Referee: Alper Ulusoy

5 November 2016 10	Beşiktaş	2–1	Trabzonspor	Istanbul
19:00 TRT (UTC+3)	Rhodolfo 7'; Tosun 17' (pen.); Özyakup (yellow card) 43'; Quaresma (yellow card) 62'	Report	Erdoğan 41'; Demirok (yellow card) 45+1'; Yavru (yellow card) 45+3'; Kıvrak (yellow card) 66'	Stadium: Vodafone Arena; Referee: Mete Kalkavan

19 November 2016 11	Adanaspor	1–2	Beşiktaş	Adana
19:00 TRT (UTC+3)	Gueye 56' (pen.); Yılmaz (red card) 71'	Report	Aboubakar 11'; Tosun 17' (pen.); Nukan (yellow card) 56'; Inler (yellow card) 78'; Hutchinson (yellow card) 90+4'	Stadium: Adana 5 Ocak Stadium; Referee: Ali Palabıyık

26 November 2016 12	Beşiktaş	1–1	İstanbul Başakşehir	Istanbul
19:00 TRT (UTC+3)	Marcelo 51'; Adriano (yellow card) 66'; Beck (yellow card) 67'	Report	Ünder (yellow card) 18', (goal) 21'	Stadium: Vodafone Arena; Referee: Cüneyt Çakır

3 December 2016 13	Fenerbahçe	0–0	Beşiktaş	Istanbul
19:00 TRT (UTC+3)	Kjær (yellow card) 13'; Potuk (yellow card) 83'	Report	Quaresma (yellow card) 56'; Tošić (yellow card) 81'; Uysal (yellow card) 90+2'	Stadium: Şükrü Saracoğlu Stadium; Referee: Hüseyin Göçek

10 December 2016 14	Beşiktaş	2–1	Bursaspor	Istanbul
19:00 TRT (UTC+3)	Uysal (yellow card) 35'; Marcelo (yellow card) 45+1'; Tosun 52' (pen.), 64' (pen.); Adriano (yellow card) 90+5'	Report	Yüce (yellow card) 39'; Tekin (yellow card) 45+2'; Ersoy (yellow card) 69'; Taşdemir 90+1'; Yıldırım (yellow card) 90+4' (yellow-red card) 90+4'	Stadium: Vodafone Arena; Referee: Bülent Yıldırım

17 December 2016 15	Kasımpaşa	2–1	Beşiktaş	Istanbul
19:00 TRT (UTC+3)	Durak (yellow card) 32'; Torun 47'; Gönül 50' (o.g.); Titi (yellow card) 81'; Popov (yellow card) 86'	Report	Tosun 31'; Adriano (yellow card) 77'; Nukan (yellow card) 87'	Stadium: Recep Tayyip Erdoğan Stadium; Referee: Halil Umut Meler

24 December 2016 16	Beşiktaş	1–0	Gaziantepspor	Istanbul
19:00 TRT (UTC+3)	Aboubakar 41'	Report	Kangwa (yellow card) 83'; Nizam (yellow card) 90'	Stadium: Vodafone Arena; Referee: Serkan Çınar

16 January 2017 17	Osmanlıspor	0–2	Beşiktaş	Ankara
19:00 TRT (UTC+3)	Altınay (yellow card) 8'; Çürüksu (yellow card) 55'	Report	Talisca 20'; Quaresma (yellow card) 42'; Marcelo (yellow card) 46'; Tosun 90+3'	Stadium: Ottoman Stadium; Referee: Ali Palabıyık

23 January 2017 18	Alanyaspor	1–4	Beşiktaş	Alanya
20:00 TRT (UTC+3)	Vágner Love 54' (pen.); Guerrier (yellow card) 56'	Report	Tosun 13', (yellow card) 17'; Babel 39', (yellow card) 82'; Quaresma 48' (pen.), (yellow card) 56'; Fabricio (yellow card) 53'; Marcelo 73'	Stadium: Alanya Oba Stadium; Referee: Alper Ulusoy

30 January 2017 19	Beşiktaş	5–1	Konyaspor	Istanbul
20:00 TRT (UTC+3)	Babel 9'; Özyakup 28'; Tosun (yellow card) 35', (goal) 50', 56', 83' (pen.); Tošić (yellow card) 61'	Report	Tošić 63' (o.g.)	Stadium: Vodafone Arena; Referee: Özgür Yankaya

10 February 2017 20	Kardemir Karabükspor	2–1	Beşiktaş	Karabük
19:00 TRT (UTC+3)	Zec 50'; Seleznyov 73'	Report	Adriano (yellow card) 21'; Gönül (yellow card) 81'; Aboubakar 87'; Quaresma (yellow card) 90+3'	Stadium: Dr. Necmettin Şeyhoğlu Stadium; Referee: Halis Özkahya

19 February 2017 21	Beşiktaş	3–1	Akhisarspor	Istanbul
19:00 TRT (UTC+3)	Tosun 13'; Talisca 27'; Nukan 69'; Adriano (yellow card) 90+3'	Report	Adın 81'	Stadium: Vodafone Arena; Referee: Barış Şimşek

27 February 2017 22	Galatasaray	0–1	Beşiktaş	Istanbul
19:00 TRT (UTC+3)	İnan (yellow card) 37'; Podolski (yellow card) 90+4'	Report	Talisca (yellow card) 22', (goal) 47'	Stadium: Türk Telekom Arena; Referee: Bülent Yıldırım

4 March 2017 23	Beşiktaş	1–0	Çaykur Rizespor	Istanbul
19:00 TRT (UTC+3)	Gönül (yellow card) 16', (goal) 41'; Nukan (yellow card) 18'; Quaresma (yellow card) 28'	Report	Yacoubi (yellow card) 45+2'; Saâdane (yellow card) 52'; Yalçın (yellow card) 65'	Stadium: Vodafone Arena; Referee: Cüneyt Çakır

12 March 2017 24	Beşiktaş	2–2	Kayserispor	Istanbul
TRT (UTC+3)	Marcelo (yellow card) 22'; Aboubakar 55', 88'; Beck (yellow card) 76'	Report	Gülen (yellow card) 29'; Lawal (yellow card) 39'; Bulut 64'; Türüç (yellow card) 72'; Beck 82' (o.g.)	Stadium: Vodafone Arena; Referee: Yunus Yıldırım

19 March 2017 25	Antalyaspor	0–0	Beşiktaş	Antalya
TRT (UTC+3)		Report	Talisca (yellow card) 35'; Aboubakar (yellow card) 60' (yellow-red card) 64'; Özyakup (yellow card) 61'	Stadium: New Antalya Stadium; Referee: Mete Kalkavan

2 April 2017 26	Beşiktaş	3–0	Gençlerbirliği	Istanbul
TRT (UTC+3)	Tosun (yellow card) 27'; Oğuzhan 45+5'; Talisca 61'; Quaresma (yellow card) 65'; Babel 85'	Report	Luccas Claro (yellow card) 21'; Oğuz (yellow card) 45+5'; Bady (yellow card) 90+1'	Stadium: Vodafone Arena; Referee: Serkan Çınar

8 April 2017 27	Trabzonspor	3–4	Beşiktaş	Trabzon
19:00 TRT (UTC+3)	Yokuşlu 25'; Yazıcı (yellow card) 38'; Castillo 63'; Rodallega 65'; Kıvrak (yellow card) 90+4'; Pereira (yellow card) 90+5'	Report	Cenk 4', (yellow card) 32'; Aboubakar 55'; Talisca 74'; Tošić (yellow card) 89'; Hutchinson 90+1'	Stadium: Şenol Güneş Stadium; Attendance: 35,513; Referee: Ali Palabıyık

24 April 2017 28	Beşiktaş	3–2	Adanaspor	Istanbul
20:00 TRT (UTC+3)	Aboubakar 11'; Talisca 51'; Tošić 80'	Report	Roni 24'; Renan Foguinho (yellow card) 58'; Gueye 66'; Didi (yellow card) 79'; Ramos (yellow card) 79'	Stadium: Vodafone Arena; Referee: Halil Umut Meler

30 April 2017 29	İstanbul Başakşehir	3–1	Beşiktaş	Istanbul
19:00 TRT (UTC+3)	Ünder 7', 18'; Adebayor 12' (yellow card) 16'; Belözoğlu (yellow card) 68'; Mossoró (yellow card) 80'	Report	Tošić (yellow card) 39'; Ba 87'	Stadium: Fatih Terim Stadium; Referee: Cüneyt Çakır

7 May 2017 30	Beşiktaş	1–1	Fenerbahçe	Istanbul
19:00 TRT (UTC+3)	Aboubakar 45+1'; Arslan (yellow card) 65'	Report	Demirel (yellow card) 28'; Uçan (yellow card) 61'; Škrtel (yellow card) 81' (yellow-red card) 88'; Emenike (yellow card) 90'; Souza (yellow card) 90' (yellow-red card) 90+2'; Marcelo 90+4' (o.g.)	Stadium: Vodafone Arena; Referee: Fırat Aydınus

15 May 2017 31	Bursaspor	0–2	Beşiktaş	Bursa
20:00 TRT (UTC+3)	Kısa (yellow card) 24'; Sivok (yellow card) 29'; Ersoy (yellow card) 50'; Jorquera (yellow card) 83'; Çinaz (yellow card) 89'	Report	Quaresma (yellow card) 45+5'; Tosun 65'; Babel (yellow card) 85'; Aboubakar 90+5'	Stadium: Timsah Arena; Referee: Bülent Yıldırım

20 May 2017 32	Beşiktaş	4–1	Kasımpaşa	Istanbul
19:00 TRT (UTC+3)	Aboubakar 2'; Quaresma 33' (pen.); Talisca 49'; Babel 65'; Uysal (yellow card) 69'; Tosun (yellow card) 76'	Report	Eduok 4'; Durak (yellow card) 10'; Sadiku (yellow card) 45+1'	Stadium: Vodafone Arena; Referee: Serkan Çınar

28 May 2017 33	Gaziantepspor	0–4	Beşiktaş	Gaziantep
19:00 TRT (UTC+3)	Nizam (yellow card) 19'; Kangwa (yellow card) 51'	Report	Babel 6'; Özyakup 39'; Talisca 66', 76'	Stadium: New Gaziantep Stadium; Referee: Mete Kalkavan

3 June 2017 34	Beşiktaş	4–0	Osmanlıspor	Istanbul
17:00 TRT (UTC+3)	Tosun 16', 89'; Tošić 31'; Aboubakar 73'	Report	Luíz Carlos (yellow card) 34'; Ağaoğlu (yellow card) 84'	Stadium: Vodafone Arena; Referee: Arda Kardeşler

=== Turkish Cup ===
==== Group stage ====
Group D
Pos	Team	Pld	W	D	L	GF	GA	GD	Pts
1	Beşiktaş (Q)	6	4	2	0	11	4	+7	14
2	Kayserispor (Q)	6	2	2	2	9	6	+3	8
3	Boluspor	6	1	3	2	5	8	−3	6
4	Darıca Gençlerbirliği	6	1	1	4	6	13	−7	4

(Q) Qualified for the round of 16

29 November 2017 1	Darıca Gençlerbirliği	1–2	Beşiktaş	Kocaeli
20:30 TRT (UTC+3)	Göktaş 63'; Karakoç (yellow card) 84'	Report	Frei 61', 85'	Stadium: İzmit İsmetpaşa Stadium; Referee: Alper Ulusoy

14 December 2016 2	Beşiktaş	2–1	Kayserispor	Istanbul
20:30 TRT (UTC+3)	Frei 71'; Öztürk (yellow card) 80'; Aboubakar 85'; Şahan (yellow card) 90+2'	Report	Sönmez (yellow card) 80'; Yaman 83'	Stadium: Vodafone Arena; Referee: Arda Kardeşler

20 December 2016 3	Boluspor	1–1	Beşiktaş	Bolu
20:00 TRT (UTC+3)	S. Şahin (yellow card) 33'; Özkaya 75'	Report	Frei 60'; Beck (yellow card) 83'	Stadium: Bolu Atatürk Stadium; Referee: Tolga Özkalfa

27 December 2016 4	Beşiktaş	2–0	Boluspor	Istanbul
18:30 TRT (UTC+3)	Talisca 34', (yellow card) 53'; Arslan (yellow card) 65'; Şişmanoğlu 73'	Report	Meraş (yellow card) 38'	Stadium: Vodafone Park; Referee: Yaşar Kemal Uğurlu

19 January 2017 5	Beşiktaş	3–0	Darıca Gençlerbirliği	Istanbul
17:00 TRT (UTC+3)	Beck 20'; Quaresma 33'; Orhan 69' (o.g.)	Report	Aynacı (yellow card) 72'	Stadium: Vodafone Park; Referee: Erkan Özdamar

26 January 2017 6	Kayserispor	1–1	Beşiktaş	Kayseri
16:00 TRT (UTC+3)	Beytaş 25'; Varela (yellow card) 71'	Report	Şahintürk 22'; Nukan (yellow card) 30'; Uysal (yellow card) 75'	Stadium: Kadir Has Stadium; Referee: Çağatay Şahan

Last updated: 26 January 2017.
Source: Soccerway

==== Knockout stage ====
5 February 2017 Round of 16	Beşiktaş	0–1	Fenerbahçe	Istanbul
19:30 TRT (UTC+3)	Tošić (red card) 41'; Hutchinson (yellow card) 67'; Adriano (yellow card) 90'; Özbiliz (yellow card) 90+4'	Report	Van Persie (yellow card) 43', (goal) 72'; Özbayraklı (yellow card) 45'; Tufan (yellow card) 90'; Lens (yellow card) 90+4'	Stadium: Vodafone Park; Referee: Ali Palabıyık

=== UEFA Champions League ===
==== Group stage ====
The group stage draw was made on 25 August 2016 in Monaco. Beşiktaş will face Benfica, Napoli and Dynamo Kyiv.

Pos	Team	Pld	W	D	L	GF	GA	GD	Pts	Qualification	NAP	BEN	BES	DKV
1	(Italy) Napoli	6	3	2	1	11	8	+3	11	Advance to knockout phase	—	4–2	2–3	0–0
2	(Portugal) Benfica	6	2	2	2	10	10	0	8	Advance to knockout phase	1–2	—	1–1	1–0
3	(Turkey) Beşiktaş	6	1	4	1	9	14	−5	7	Transfer to Europa League	1–1	3–3	—	1–1
4	(Ukraine) Dynamo Kyiv	6	1	2	3	8	6	+2	5		1–2	0–2	6–0	—

Source: UEFA

13 September 2016 1	Benfica (Portugal)	1–1	(Turkey) Beşiktaş	Lisbon
21:45 TRT (UTC+3)	Cervi 12'; Samaris (yellow card) 78'; Salvio (yellow card) 87'	Report	Erkin (yellow card) 87'; Beck (yellow card) 88'; Talisca 90'	Stadium: Estádio da Luz; Attendance: 42,126; Referee: Milorad Mažić (Serbia)

28 September 2016 2	Beşiktaş (Turkey)	1–1	(Ukraine) Dynamo Kyiv	Istanbul
21:45 TRT (UTC+3)	Quaresma 29'; Adriano (yellow card) 40'; Arslan (yellow card) 54'	Report	Korzun (yellow card) 27'; Tsyhankov 62'; Harmash (yellow card) 65'; Vida (yellow card) 70'	Stadium: Vodafone Arena; Attendance: 33,938; Referee: Felix Zwayer (Germany)

19 October 2016 3	Napoli (Italy)	2–3	(Turkey) Beşiktaş	Naples
21:45 TRT (UTC+3)	Mertens 30'; Maggio (yellow card) 53'; Gabbiadini 69' (pen.)	Report	Adriano 12', (yellow card) 53'; Aboubakar 38', 86', (yellow card) 88'; Erkin (yellow card) 68'	Stadium: Stadio San Paolo; Attendance: 28,502; Referee: Sergei Karasev (Russia)

1 November 2016 4	Beşiktaş (Turkey)	1–1	(Italy) Napoli	Istanbul
21:45 TRT (UTC+3)	Inler (yellow card) 47'; Quaresma 79' (pen.); Tosun (yellow card) 83'	Report	Jorginho (yellow card) 57'; Hamšík 82'	Stadium: Vodafone Arena; Attendance: 35,552; Referee: Mark Clattenburg (England)

23 November 2016 5	Beşiktaş (Turkey)	3–3	(Portugal) Benfica	Istanbul
20:45 TRT (UTC+3)	Arslan (yellow card) 29'; Tosun 58'; Quaresma 83' (pen.); Aboubakar 89', (yellow card) 90'	Report	Guedes 10'; Semedo 25'; Fejsa 31'; Pizzi (yellow card) 34'; Luisão (yellow card) 77'	Stadium: Vodafone Arena; Attendance: 36,063; Referee: Damir Skomina (Slovenia)

6 December 2016 6	Dynamo Kyiv (Ukraine)	6–0	(Turkey) Beşiktaş	Kyiv
22:45 TRT (UTC+3)	Besyedin 9'; Yarmolenko 30' (pen.); Buyalskyi 32'; Burda (yellow card) 43'; González 45'; Sydorchuk 60'; Moraes 77'	Report	Özyakup (yellow card) 20'; Beck (red card) 29'; Aboubakar (yellow card) 30' (red card) 56'; Adriano (yellow card) 49'	Stadium: NSC Olimpiyskiy; Attendance: 14,036; Referee: Craig Thomson (Scotland)

=== UEFA Europa League ===
Beşiktaş ranked third in Champions League group stage and transferred to UEFA Europa League. Beşiktaş was one of the seeded teams on draw. Because Beşiktaş was one of the best four of third-ranked teams in Champions League group stage. In the round of 32, Beşiktaş defeated Hapoel Be'er Sheva with an aggregate score of 5–2 and then moved on to defeat Olympiacos with an aggregate score of 5–2. Beşiktaş will play Lyon on 13 and 20 April in the team's third ever Quarter Finals.

==== Knockout phase ====
===== Round of 32 =====
16 February 2017 First leg	Hapoel Be'er Sheva (Israel)	1–3	(Turkey) Beşiktaş	Be'er Sheva, Israel
21:05 TRT (UTC+3)	Tzedek (yellow card) 5'; Barda 44'	Report	Soares 42' (o.g.); Tosun 60'; Hutchinson 90+3'	Stadium: Turner Stadium; Attendance: 15,347; Referee: Martin Atkinson (England)

23 February 2017 Second leg	Beşiktaş (Turkey)	2–1 (5–2 agg.)	(Israel) Hapoel Be'er Sheva	Istanbul, Turkey
19:00 TRT (UTC+3)	Aboubakar 17'; Tosun 87'; Marcelo (yellow card) 89'	Report	Nwakaeme 64'; Barda (yellow card) 89'	Stadium: Vodafone Arena; Attendance: 27,892; Referee: Matej Jug (Slovenia)

===== Round of 16 =====
9 March 2017 First leg	Olympiacos (Greece)	1–1	(Turkey) Beşiktaş	Pireus, Greece
21:05 TRT (UTC+3)	Cambiasso 36'	Report	Arslan (yellow card) 15'; Aboubakar 53'; Marcelo (yellow card) 66'	Stadium: Karaiskakis Stadium; Attendance: 25,515; Referee: Danny Makkelie (Netherlands)

16 March 2017 Second leg	Beşiktaş (Turkey)	4–1 (5–2 agg.)	(Greece) Olympiacos	Istanbul, Turkey
19:05 TRT (UTC+3)	Aboubakar 10', (red card) 39'; Babel 22', 75'; Özyakup (yellow card) 57'; Tosun 84'	Report	Elyounoussi 31'; Sebá (yellow card) 62'; Da Costa (yellow card) 67'; Romao (yellow card) 71'	Stadium: Vodafone Arena; Attendance: 37,966; Referee: Michael Oliver (England)

===== Quarter-finals =====
13 April 2017 First leg	Lyon (France)	2–1	(Turkey) Beşiktaş	Décines-Charpieu, France
22:50 (Note: The Lyon v Beşiktaş match, originally scheduled for 21:05 CEST, was delayed to 21:50 CEST due to crowd disturbances.) TRT (UTC+3)	Rafael (yellow card) 19'; Lacazette (yellow card) 58'; Fekir (yellow card) 67'; Jallet (yellow card) 73'; Valbuena (yellow card) 80'; Tolisso 83'; Morel 84'	Report	Babel 15'; Marcelo (yellow card) 21'; Arslan (yellow card) 82'	Stadium: Parc Olympique Lyonnais; Attendance: 55,452; Referee: Antonio Mateu Lahoz, (Spain)

20 April 2017 Second leg	Beşiktaş (Turkey)	2–1 (a.e.t.) (3–3 agg.) (6–7 p)	(France) Lyon	Istanbul, Turkey
19:00 TRT (UTC+3)	Talisca 27', 58'; Adriano (yellow card) 29'; Tošić (yellow card) 78'; Gönül (yellow card) 118'	Report	Gonalons (yellow card) 32'; Lacazette 34'	Stadium: Vodafone Arena; Attendance: 39,623; Referee: Milorad Mažić (Serbia)
	Penalties
	Babel (penalty scored); Tosun (penalty scored); Hutchinson (penalty scored); Arslan (penalty scored); Talisca (penalty scored); Uysal (penalty scored); Tošić (penalty missed); Mitrović (penalty missed)		(penalty scored) Fekir; (penalty scored) Tolisso; (penalty scored) Ghezzal; (penalty scored) Rybus; (penalty scored) Valbuena; (penalty scored) Diakhaby; (penalty missed) Jallet; (penalty scored) Gonalons

== Squad statistics ==
As of Match played 3 June 2017

=== Appearances and goals ===
No.	Pos	Nat	Player	Total		Süper Lig		Turkish Cup		Super Cup		Champions League		Europa League	
No.	Pos	Nat	Player	Apps	Goals	Apps	Goals	Apps	Goals	Apps	Goals	Apps	Goals	Apps	Goals
1	GK	(Spain) ESP	Fabricio	44	0	32	0	1	0	0	0	5	0	6	0
2	DF	(Croatia) CRO	Matej Mitrović	14	0	2+5	0	2+1	0	0	0	0	0	4	0
3	DF	(Brazil) BRA	Adriano	45	2	24+7	1	3	0	0+1	0	6	1	4	0
6	DF	(Serbia) SRB	Duško Tošić	40	2	26	2	1	0	1	0	6	0	6	0
7	MF	(Portugal) POR	Ricardo Quaresma	44	6	26+3	2	3	1	0+1	0	6	3	5	0
8	MF	(Austria) AUT	Veli Kavlak	2	0	0	0	2	0	0	0	0	0	0	0
9	FW	(Cameroon) CMR	Vincent Aboubakar	38	19	16+11	12	2	1	0	0	6	3	3	3
13	MF	(Canada) CAN	Atiba Hutchinson	41	2	28	1	1	0	1	0	6	0	5	1
14	DF	(Turkey) TUR	Fatih Aksoy	6	0	0	0	3+3	0	0	0	0	0	0	0
15	MF	(Turkey) TUR	Oğuzhan Özyakup	40	5	28+1	5	1	0	1	0	3+1	0	3+2	0
17	MF	(Turkey) TUR	Ömer Şişmanoğlu	16	3	2+6	2	6	1	0+1	0	0	0	0+1	0
18	MF	(Germany) GER	Tolgay Arslan	44	0	18+12	0	2+1	0	1	0	5	0	2+3	0
19	MF	(Germany) GER	Oğuzhan Aydoğan	1	0	0	0	0+1	0	0	0	0	0	0	0
20	DF	(Turkey) TUR	Necip Uysal	27	0	5+12	0	2+1	0	1	0	1	0	2+3	0
22	MF	(Armenia) ARM	Aras Özbiliz	4	0	0+1	0	2+1	0	0	0	0	0	0	0
23	FW	(Turkey) TUR	Cenk Tosun	47	24	29+4	20	1	0	1	0	0+6	1	3+3	3
29	GK	(Turkey) TUR	Tolga Zengin	9	0	2+1	0	4	0	1	0	1	0	0	0
30	DF	(Brazil) BRA	Marcelo	35	3	32	3	2	0	1	0	0	0	0	0
32	DF	(Germany) GER	Andreas Beck	30	1	8+9	0	4	1	1	0	6	0	1+1	0
33	DF	(Turkey) TUR	Atınç Nukan	17	1	7+1	1	6	0	0	0	0+1	0	1+1	0
44	DF	(Brazil) BRA	Rhodolfo	10	1	3+2	1	4	0	0	0	1	0	0	0
49	MF	(Netherlands) NED	Ryan Babel	25	8	18	5	1	0	0	0	0	0	6	3
50	FW	(Turkey) TUR	Hamza Küçükköylü	2	0	0	0	0+2	0	0	0	0	0	0	0
67	MF	(Turkey) TUR	Muhammed Enes Durmuş	6	0	0	0	1+5	0	0	0	0	0	0	0
77	DF	(Turkey) TUR	Gökhan Gönül	38	1	27+2	1	2	0	0	0	1+1	0	5	0
80	MF	(Turkey) TUR	Gökhan Inler	30	0	5+9	0	6	0	0	0	2+3	0	1+4	0
88	DF	(Turkey) TUR	Caner Erkin	11	0	6+2	0	0	0	0	0	3	0	0	0
94	MF	(Brazil) BRA	Talisca	33	17	21+1	13	2	1	0	0	1+2	1	5+1	2
97	GK	(Turkey) TUR	Utku Yuvakuran	2	0	0	0	2	0	0	0	0	0	0	0
99	FW	(Senegal) SEN	Demba Ba	2	0	0+2	0	0	0	0	0	0	0	0	0
	MF	(Turkey) TUR	Eslem Öztürk	4	0	0	0	1+3	0	0	0	0	0	0	0
	MF	(Turkey) TUR	İbrahim Tekeli	1	0	0	0	0+1	0	0	0	0	0	0	0
	MF	(Turkey) TUR	Sedat Şahintürk	2	1	0	0	2	1	0	0	0	0	0	0
Players away from Beşiktaş on loan:
Players who left Beşiktaş during the season:
10	MF	(Turkey) TUR	Olcay Şahan	18	2	8+3	2	4	0	1	0	1+1	0	0	0
21	MF	(Turkey) TUR	Kerim Frei	14	4	1+6	0	4	4	1	0	0+2	0	0	0

=== Goal scorers ===
Place	Position	Nation	Number	Name	Süper Lig	Turkish Cup	Super Cup	Champions League	Europa League	Total
1	FW	(Turkey)	23	Cenk Tosun	20	0	0	1	3	24
2	FW	(Cameroon)	9	Vincent Aboubakar	12	1	0	3	3	19
3	MF	(Brazil)	94	Talisca	13	1	0	1	2	17
4	MF	(Netherlands)	49	Ryan Babel	5	0	0	0	3	8
5	MF	(Portugal)	7	Ricardo Quaresma	2	1	0	3	0	6
6	MF	(Turkey)	15	Oğuzhan Özyakup	5	0	0	0	0	5
7	MF	(Turkey)	21	Kerim Frei	0	4	0	0	0	4
7				Own goal	1	1	1	0	1	4
9	MF	(Brazil)	30	Marcelo	3	0	0	0	0	3
9	FW	(Turkey)	17	Ömer Şişmanoğlu	2	1	0	0	0	3
11	MF	(Turkey)	10	Olcay Şahan	2	0	0	0	0	2
11	DF	(Serbia)	6	Duško Tošić	2	0	0	0	0	2
11	DF	(Brazil)	3	Adriano	1	0	0	1	0	2
11	MF	(Canada)	13	Atiba Hutchinson	1	0	0	0	1	2
15	DF	(Brazil)	44	Rhodolfo	1	0	0	0	0	1
15	DF	(Turkey)	77	Gökhan Gönül	1	0	0	0	0	1
15	FW	(Senegal)	99	Demba Ba	1	0	0	0	0	1
15	DF	(Turkey)	33	Atınç Nukan	1	0	0	0	0	1
15	DF	(Germany)	32	Andreas Beck	0	1	0	0	0	1
15	MF	(Turkey)		Sedat Şahintürk	0	1	0	0	0	1
				TOTALS	73	11	1	9	13	107

=== Disciplinary record ===
Number	Nation	Position	Name	Süper Lig		Turkish Cup		Super Cup		Champions League		Europa League		Total	
Number	Nation	Position	Name	Yellow card	Red card	Yellow card	Red card	Yellow card	Red card	Yellow card	Red card	Yellow card	Red card	Yellow card	Red card
1	(Spain)	GK	Fabricio	1	0	0	0	0	0	0	0	0	0	1	0
3	(Brazil)	DF	Adriano	6	0	1	0	0	0	3	0	1	0	11	0
6	(Serbia)	DF	Duško Tošić	8	0	0	1	0	0	0	0	1	0	9	1
7	(Portugal)	MF	Ricardo Quaresma	10	0	0	0	0	0	0	0	0	0	10	0
9	(Cameroon)	FW	Vincent Aboubakar	2	1	0	0	0	0	4	1	0	1	6	3
10	(Turkey)	MF	Olcay Şahan	1	0	1	0	0	0	0	0	0	0	2	0
13	(Canada)	MF	Atiba Hutchinson	3	0	1	0	0	0	0	0	0	0	4	0
15	(Turkey)	MF	Oğuzhan Özyakup	2	0	0	0	1	0	1	0	1	0	5	0
18	(Germany)	MF	Tolgay Arslan	2	0	1	0	0	0	2	0	2	0	7	0
20	(Turkey)	MF	Necip Uysal	5	1	1	0	1	0	0	0	0	0	7	1
22	(Armenia)	MF	Aras Özbiliz	0	0	1	0	0	0	0	0	0	0	1	0
23	(Turkey)	FW	Cenk Tosun	5	0	0	0	0	0	1	0	0	0	6	0
29	(Turkey)	GK	Tolga Zengin	1	0	0	0	0	0	0	0	0	0	1	0
30	(Brazil)	DF	Marcelo	6	0	0	0	0	0	0	0	0	0	6	0
32	(Germany)	DF	Andreas Beck	2	0	1	0	1	0	1	1	0	0	5	1
33	(Turkey)	DF	Atınç Nukan	3	0	1	0	0	0	0	0	0	0	4	0
49	(Netherlands)	MF	Ryan Babel	2	0	0	0	0	0	0	0	0	0	2	0
77	(Turkey)	DF	Gökhan Gönül	4	0	0	0	0	0	0	0	1	0	5	0
80	(Turkey)	MF	Gökhan Inler	1	0	0	0	0	0	1	0	0	0	2	0
88	(Turkey)	DF	Caner Erkin	1	0	0	0	0	0	2	0	0	0	3	0
94	(Brazil)	MF	Talisca	2	0	1	0	0	0	0	0	0	0	3	0
	(Turkey)	MF	Eslem Öztürk	0	0	1	0	0	0	0	0	0	0	1	0
			TOTALS	67	2	10	1	3	0	15	2	6	1	101	6
