= Sedat Şahintürk =

Turkish footballer

Personal information
- Date of birth: 7 February 1996 (age 30)
- Place of birth: İzmit, Turkey
- Height: 1.73 m (5 ft 8 in)
- Position: Left midfielder

Team information
- Current team: Etimesgutspor
- Number: 10

Youth career
- 2006–2008: Kocaeli Büyükşehir
- 2008–2010: Osmanlıspor
- 2010–2012: Üçyoldoğuspor
- 2012–2013: Kocaeli 1937
- 2013–2016: Beşiktaş

Senior career*
Years	Team	Apps	(Gls)
2016–2020	Beşiktaş	0	(0)
2017–2019	→ Balıkesirspor (loan)	61	(10)
2019–2020	→ Denizlispor (loan)	10	(0)
2020–2023	Adana Demirspor	28	(1)
2022	→ Tuzlaspor (loan)	24	(3)
2022–2023	→ Bandırmaspor (loan)	20	(3)
2023–2024	Menemen	30	(5)
2024–2025	Beykoz Anadolu	14	(2)
2025	Adana 01 FK	15	(9)
2025–2026	Muğlaspor	34	(4)
2026–	Etimesgutspor	7	(2)

International career
2017	Turkey U21	1	(0)
- * Club domestic league appearances and goals as of 11 November 2026

Sedat Şahintürk (born 7 February 1996) is a Turkish professional footballer who plays as a left midfielder for TFF 3. Lig club Etimesgutspor.

== Club career ==
Şahintürk started off his youth career with a two-year spell with Kocaeli Büyükşehir, which preceded moves to Osmanlıspor, Üçyoldoğuspor and Kocaeli 1937 between 2008 and 2013. In 2013, he was signed by Beşiktaş. Şahintürk made his senior debut for the Süper Lig side in November 2016, featuring for seventy-two minutes of a victory away to Darıca Gençlerbirliği in the Turkish Cup. He featured in a later Group D match against fellow Süper Lig outfit Kayserispor on 26 January 2017, scoring the club's goal in a 1–1 draw. Nine months later, in September, Şahintürk was loaned out to Balıkesirspor of the TFF First League.

He netted on his debut when he scored an eighty-seventh minute winner away to Ankaragücü on 9 September. The loan was renewed at the conclusion of the 2017–18 TFF First League campaign.

On 12 July 2019, after renewing his contract until 2022, Beşiktaş announced that Şahintürk was loaned out to newly-promoted Süper Lig team Denizlispor for a year.

== International career ==
In November 2017, Şahintürk was selected for the Turkey U21s by manager Abdullah Ercan. He made his first appearance in a UEFA European Under-21 Championship qualifier against Belgium on 14 November.

== Career statistics ==
As of 7 March 2020.

Club statistics
Club	Season	League			Cup		Continental		Other		Total	
Club	Season	Division	Apps	Goals	Apps	Goals	Apps	Goals	Apps	Goals	Apps	Goals
Beşiktaş	2016–17	Süper Lig	0	0	2	1	0	0	0	0	2	1
Beşiktaş	2017–18	Süper Lig	0	0	0	0	0	0	0	0	0	0
Beşiktaş	2018–19	Süper Lig	0	0	0	0	0	0	0	0	0	0
Beşiktaş	2019–20	Süper Lig	0	0	0	0	0	0	0	0	0	0
Beşiktaş	Total		0	0	2	1	0	0	0	0	2	1
Balıkesirspor (loan)	2017–18	First League	28	7	1	0	—		0	0	29	7
Balıkesirspor (loan)	2018–19	First League	22	2	6	3	—		0	0	28	5
Balıkesirspor (loan)	Total		50	9	7	3	—		0	0	57	12
Denizlispor (loan)	2019–20	Süper Lig	7	0	6	0	—		0	0	13	0
Career total			57	9	15	4	0	0	0	0	72	13
