= Atiba Hutchinson =

Canadian soccer player (born 1983)

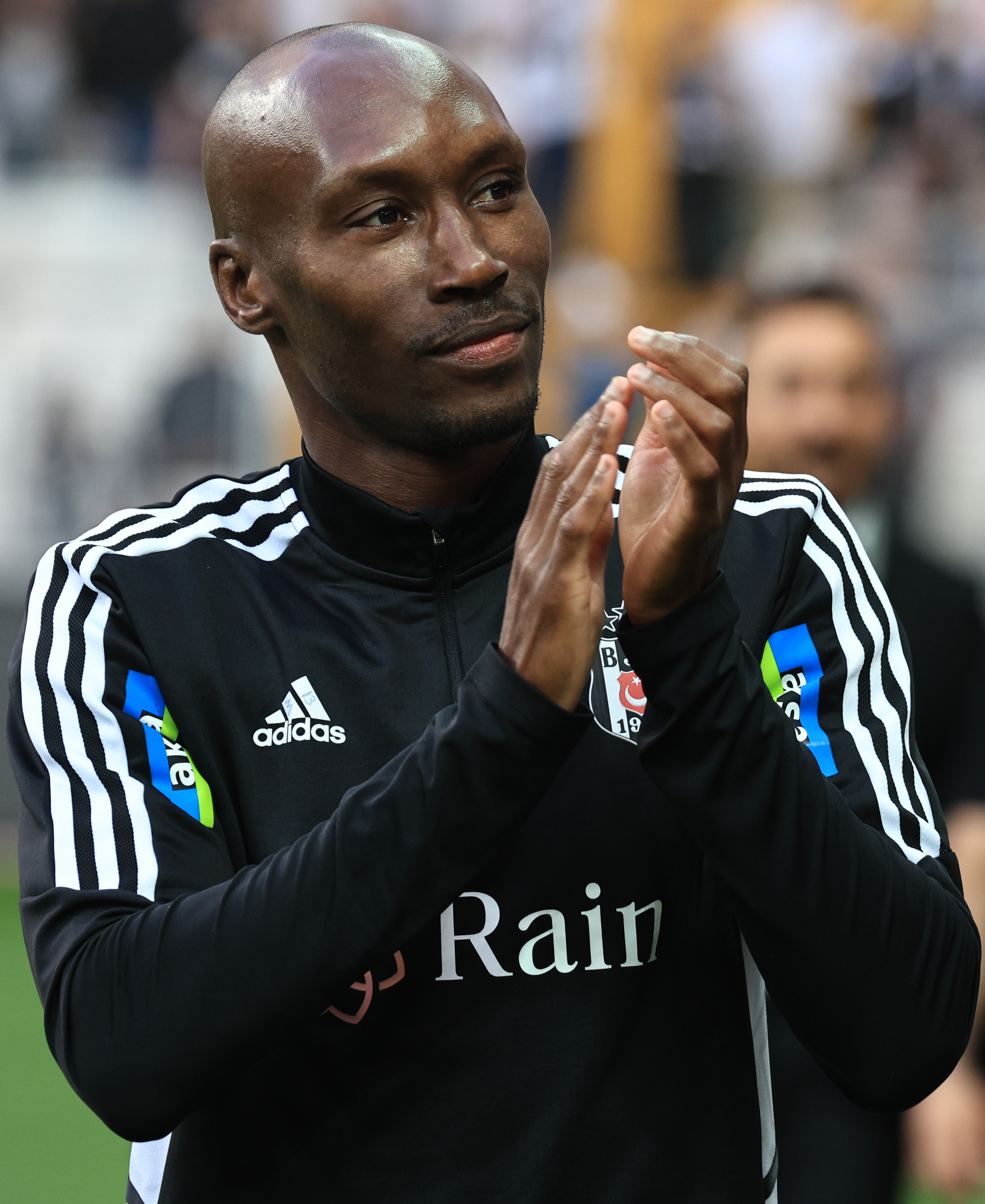
- Hutchinson with Beşiktaş in 2023

Personal information
- Birth name: Atiba Hutchinson
- Date of birth: 8 February 1983 (age 43)
- Place of birth: Brampton, Ontario, Canada
- Height: 1.87 m (6 ft 2 in)
- Position: Midfielder

Youth career
- Brampton YSC
- North Scarborough SC
- Woodbridge Strikers

Senior career*
| Years | Team | Apps | (Gls) |
| 2002 | York Region Shooters | 2 | (0) |
| 2002–2003 | Toronto Lynx | 4 | (0) |
| 2003–2004 | Öster | 24 | (6) |
| 2004–2006 | Helsingborg | 49 | (6) |
| 2006–2010 | Copenhagen | 139 | (22) |
| 2010–2013 | PSV | 80 | (4) |
| 2013–2023 | Beşiktaş | 270 | (24) |
| Total | | 568 | (62) |

International career
| 2001–2003 | Canada U20 | 19 | (0) |
| 2002–2004 | Canada U23 | 10 | (0) |
| 2003–2023 | Canada | 104 | (9) |
Medal record
Men's soccer
Representing Canada
CONCACAF Nations League
| Runner-up | 2023 |
- * Club domestic league appearances and goals

Atiba Hutchinson (born 8 February 1983) is a Canadian former professional soccer player who played as a midfielder. Considered a Canada soccer legend, with 104 international appearances in the span of 20 years, he is the Canadian men's national team's record cap holder.

Hutchinson rose to prominence at F.C. Copenhagen as the first North American to become Danish Superliga Player of the Year. That same season, he won the first of six Canadian Player of the Year awards. He had a fairly uneventful spell with PSV Eindhoven between 2010 and 2013 and then spent the next 10 years at Beşiktaş in Turkey, before retiring in 2023.

In 2012, as part of the Canadian Soccer Association's centennial celebration, he was named to the all-time Canadian men's XI. He served as a leader and pioneer for Canada's golden generation at the latter stages of his career.

== Club career ==
=== Early career ===
Hutchinson was born in Brampton, Ontario to Trinidadian parents. He began playing youth soccer at age four for Brampton Youth SC and later played youth soccer for North Scarborough SC and Woodbridge Strikers. Following a March 2001 trial at Schalke 04 in Germany, Hutchinson began his professional career in the 2002 summer season, playing briefly with the York Region Shooters of the Canadian Professional Football League before signing with the Toronto Lynx of the then A-League in mid-season, on 26 July, and playing in the team's final four games.

=== Öster ===
In January 2003 he signed with Östers IF, newly promoted to the Swedish Allsvenskan. Hutchinson scored six times for Öster during the 2003 season. With the club relegated out of the Allsvenskan, Hutchinson was granted a transfer for an estimated £1.32 million and signed with Helsingborgs IF in January 2004.

=== Helsingborg ===
Expectations were high for him the first season in Helsingborg, but they were ultimately unsatisfied. However, in the 2005 season he was consistently the team's best player, scoring six goals from a primarily defensive midfield position.

=== Copenhagen ===
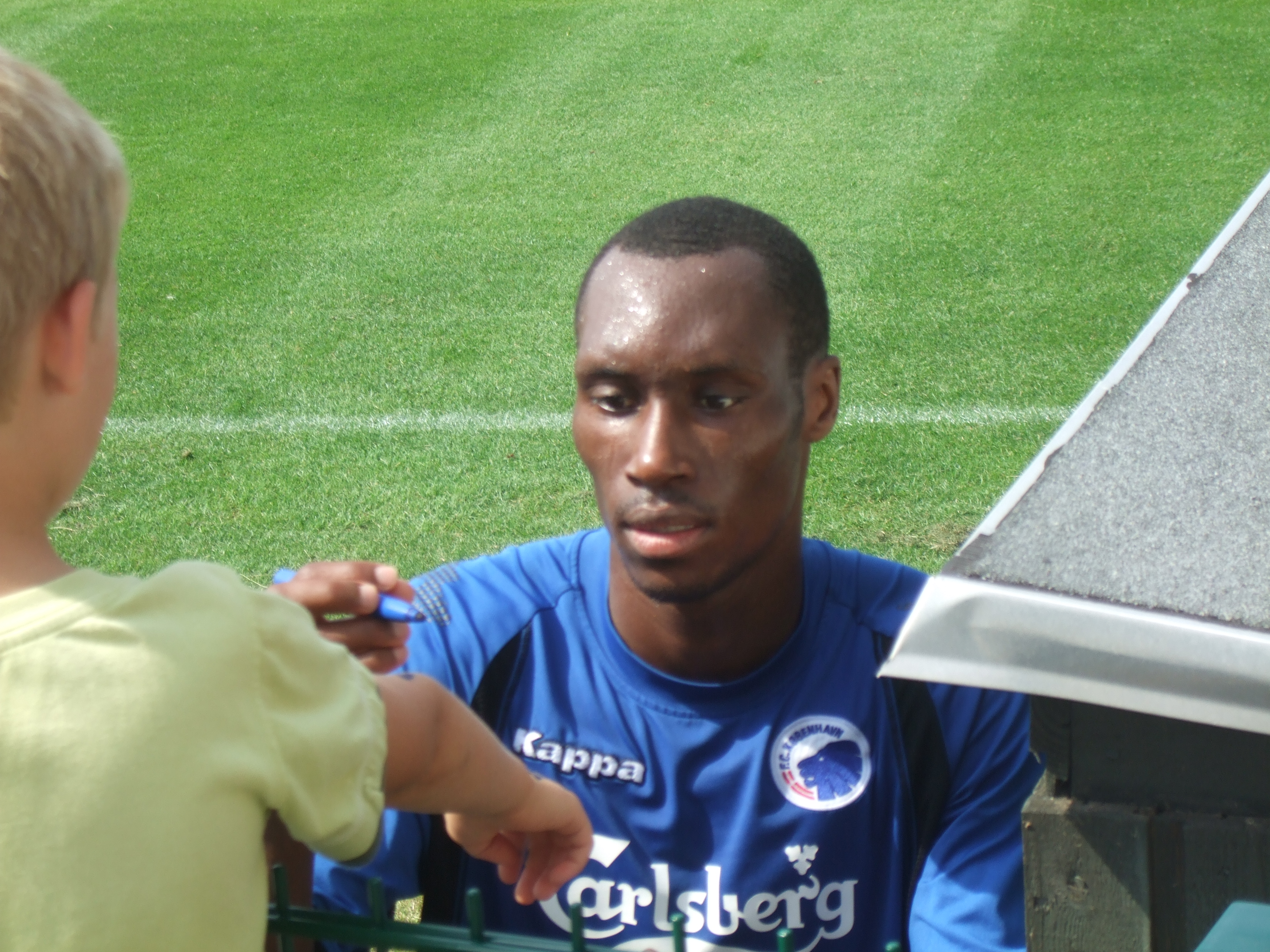
Hutchinson signing autographs in 2008

Hutchinson moved to Danish club F.C. Copenhagen, where, for the first half of the year, he played alongside Swedish international Tobias Linderoth in central midfield, latterly being used around the midfield and as a striker. Manager Ståle Solbakken said in an interview with the football paper TIPS-bladet, that he saw Hutchinson's attacking talents as being too impressive for a central midfielder, saying that he would be used more often as winger. He was linked with Premier League clubs several times.

After Hutchinson had left Denmark for his new team in the Eredivisie he was awarded Danish Super Liga Player of the Year for his last season with Copenhagen. This award was given on 15 November 2010 by Franz Beckenbauer at the annual Danish Football Association award show. This was the first time a Canadian had won this award in the Danish League.

In 2014, 32,000 fans participated in a fan vote selecting their 11 all-time favourite Copenhagen players, selecting Hutchinson in the midfield.

=== PSV ===
On 22 April 2010, Hutchinson signed a three-year contract with PSV Eindhoven joining them on a free transfer. Atiba made his PSV debut in a 6–0 home victory against De Graafschap on 14 August 2010. Four days later he made his European debut for the team in a surprising 1–0 first leg defeat to FC Sibir Novosibirsk in the Europa League, however PSV won the second leg 5–0 making it to the next stage of the competition. Atiba scored his first goal with the Dutch side on 23 January 2011, his goal came in the 46th minute of a 3–0 away victory against VVV-Venlo.

Hutchinson started the 2010 season playing a defensive role as a right back, however with the mid-season transfer of Ibrahim Afellay to Barcelona allowed Hutchinson to move into his more natural position of the central midfield. Atiba continued to impress through the winter scoring his second goal of the season in a 3–2 away victory against Excelsior on 5 March 2011. Atiba also help lead PSV to the Quarter Finals of the Europa League before being knocked out by Benfica in mid-April losing 6–3 on aggregate.

Hutchinson was forced to miss the beginning of the 2011–12 Eredivisie due to his knee injury sustained with Canada at the Gold Cup that summer. After missing the first two games of the season Hutchinson made his return on 21 August 2011 as a second-half substitute for Zakaria Labyad against ADO Den Haag, the game ended in a 3–0 away victory for PSV. Weeks later Hutchinson sustained yet another knee injury during a 2014 FIFA World Cup qualification against Saint Lucia forcing him to have his third knee operation in 18 months. Despite this, he started the KNVB Cup final for PSV against Heracles Almelo, which PSV won.

With PSV's summer addition of Mark van Bommel Hutchinson was moved back to defense playing right back. On 26 August 2012, he scored his first goal of the new season courtesy of a Dries Mertens through ball in the 38th minute, the game ended in a 3–1 away victory over FC Groningen.

=== Beşiktaş ===
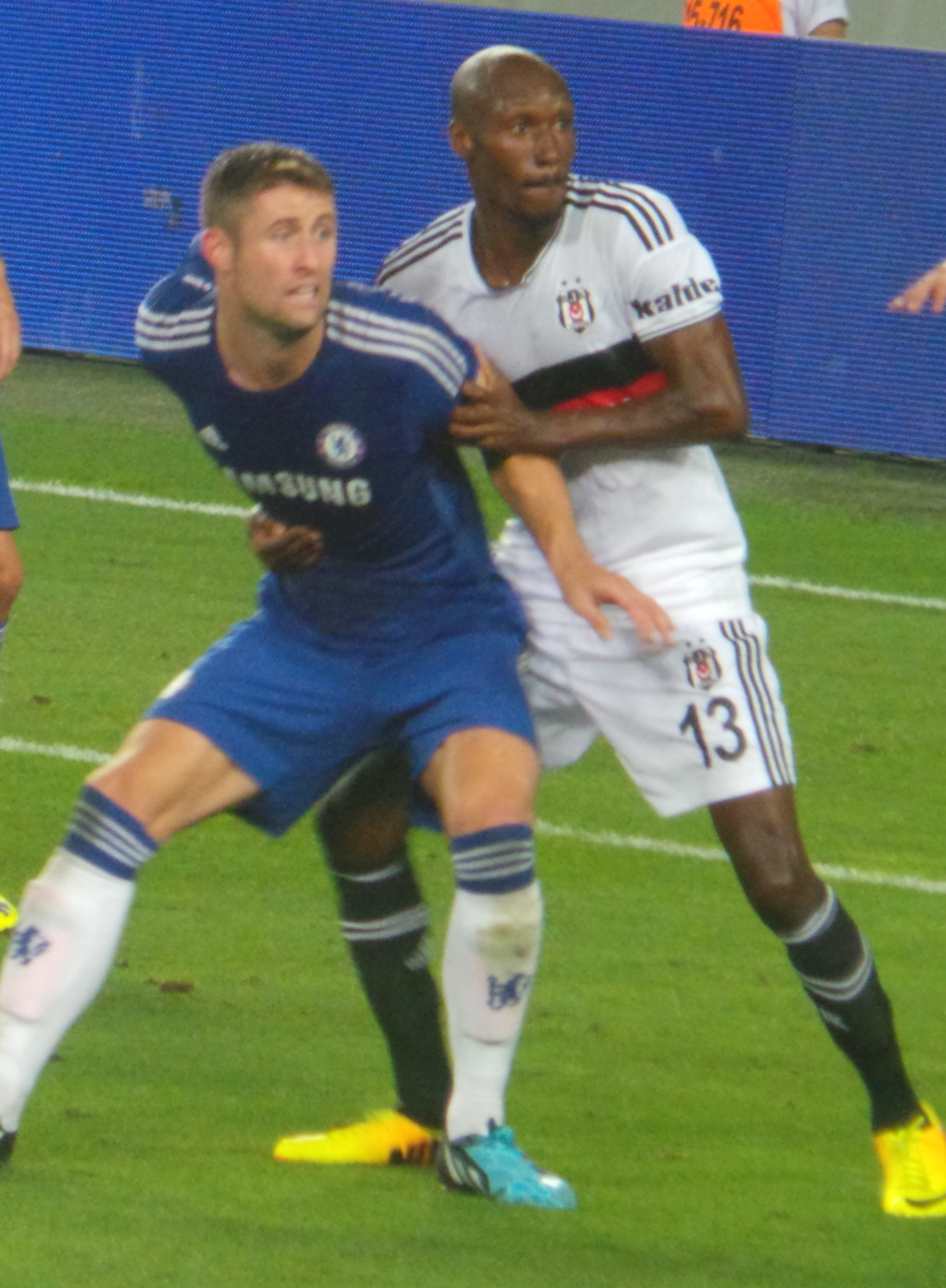
Hutchinson playing against Chelsea in 2014

With a desire to sign for a Premier League club, Hutchinson let his contract run out with PSV and went into the summer of 2013 looking for a new team, but on 31 July it was announced that he had joined Beşiktaş in the Süper Lig on a two-year deal.

Hutchinson scored his first goal for the club on 23 March 2014 in a 3–0 victory over Akhisar Belediyespor. After missing the first leg in the 2014–15 UEFA Champions League play-off round Hutchinson had a standout performance against Arsenal in which Arsène Wenger said Hutchinson was the most impressive Besiktas player; the game ended in a 1–0 away defeat for the Turkish side.

During the summer of 2015, Hutchinson signed a two-year extension with Beşiktaş. In the 2015–16 Süper Lig season, Hutchinson was rewarded with another hard fought honour as Beşiktaş triumphed in the league campaign, which was successfully repeated in the 2016–17 Süper Lig season, again with Hutchinson in a key playmaking defensive midfielder role.

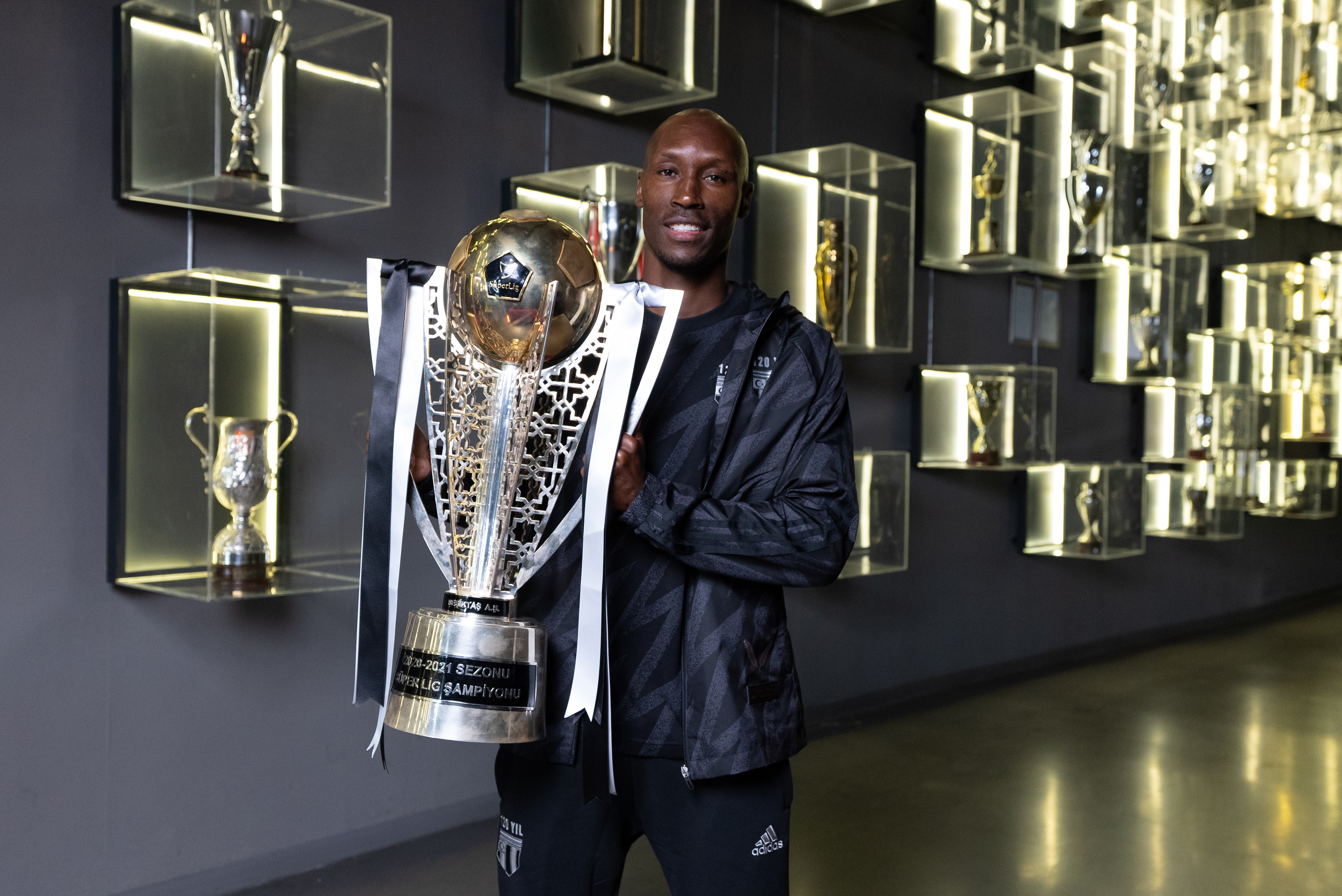
Hutchinson in Beşiktaş Stadium front of the trophy wall from Thank You Atiba documentary shooting

In August 2018, Hutchinson signed a one-year new contract with the club, which had a clause to extend the contract a further season if certain performance criteria are met. During the 2019–20 season, Hutchinson reached 200 league appearances with Beşiktaş.

On 15 August 2020, Hutchinson signed another extension with Beşiktaş that would keep him with the club through the end of the 2020–21 season.

On 6 July 2021, Hutchinson signed another one-year extension with Beşiktaş. In July 2022, he signed a further one-year extension. In May 2023, Beşiktaş confirmed Hutchinson would depart the club at the conclusion of the season. His final appearance for the club would be on 3 June against Kasımpaşa, with Hutchinson scoring a penalty, capping off a 5–2 victory. Prior to Beşiktaş' final game of the season against Konyaspor, he was honoured by the club for his 10-year tenure in front of the fans at Vodafone Park. After 2023 CONCACAF Nations League final match, he retired.

During his spell in Istanbul, Hutchinson became a fan favourite at Beşiktaş and said that he was regularly recognised by supporters in the city because of his long time at the club, while noting that he experienced far less public attention when he returned to Canada and described that contrast as "extremely unusual".

== International career ==
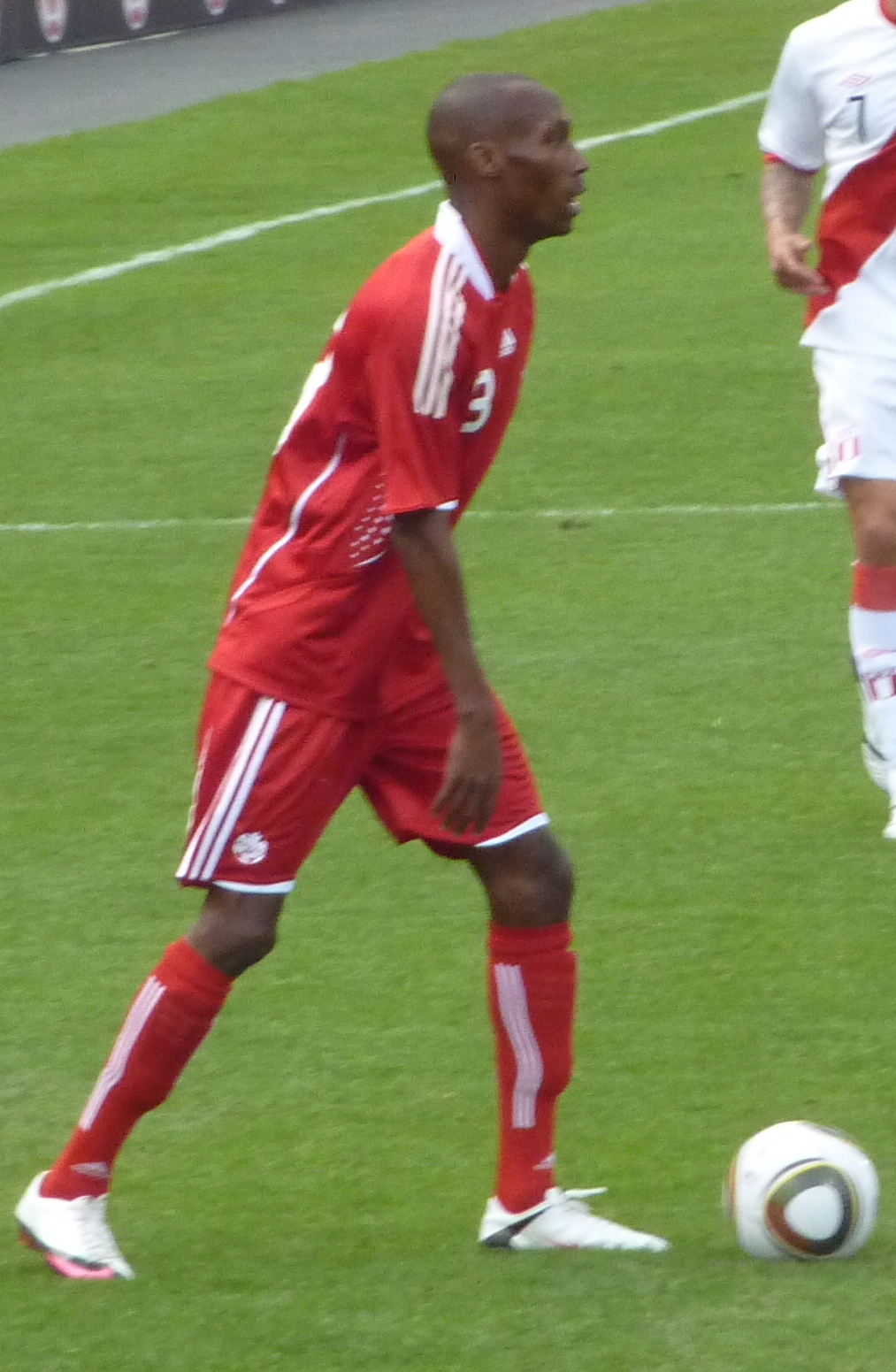
Hutchinson playing against Peru at BMO Field on 4 September 2010

The early years of Hutchinson's international career included appearances at both the 2001 and 2003 FIFA World Youth Championships. He made his senior debut for Canada in a January 2003 friendly match against the United States. That same year, he appeared in the 2003 edition of the CONCACAF Gold Cup and would go on to appear in five subsequent editions in the following two decades (2005, 2007, 2009, 2011 and 2019).

Canada reached the semi-finals of the 2007 CONCACAF Gold Cup, another match against the United States, which was the site of one of the most controversial moments in Hutchinson's career. With Canada down 2–1 in regulation time, Hutchinson scored a goal in the final minute of stoppage time, having received a ball that bounced off the head of American defender Oguchi Onyewu. However, the goal was ruled offside by referee Benito Archundia, as a result of which the United States won the game and proceeded to the final. Both then and subsequently, many believed that Archundia's call was incorrect. Hutchinson has said that the episode "stuck with" players and supporters in Canada for many years and noted that the disallowed goal later became known among fans as "Atiba was onside", reflecting a wider feeling that the national team rarely received favourable calls at that time.

On 17 December 2010, Hutchinson was awarded the Canadian Men's Player of the Year by the CSA for the first time in his career. Hutchinson was heavily favoured for this award in 2010 for his play with the national team, joining a well-known European club and becoming the first Canadian to win the Danish Superliga Player of the Year. Selected to the 2011 CONCACAF Gold Cup squad, Hutchinson exited the tournament following a 0–2 loss to the Americans at Ford Field after sustaining a knee injury. He was forced to miss the rest of the tournament.

For much of Hutchinson's career, Canada was not able to field a genuinely competitive international team, and qualification to the FIFA World Cup persistently eluded them. As part of the CONCACAF qualification process for the 2014 FIFA World Cup in Brazil, Canada was on the verge of reaching the final stage of CONCACAF qualification for the first time since 1998. Going into its final game of the third round against Honduras in San Pedro Sula on 16 October 2012, Canada needed only a draw to reach the fourth and final stage of qualification. Instead, the team was routed in an 8–1 victory for Honduras, its worst loss in almost thirty years. That game would come to be regarded as the lowest point in the team's history by many. Hutchinson was again named Canada Soccer's male player of the year to end 2012, and affirmed that he hoped to pursue another World Cup qualification, saying "It would still mean everything to me if I could be part of the team and give another go at it."

Hutchinson was once again awarded the 2015 Canadian Men's Player of the Year by the CFA, marking his fourth straight award and fifth in the last six years. He went on to win the title again in 2016 and 2017. However, Canada would not fare any better in attempting to qualify for the 2018 FIFA World Cup, failing to advance to the fifth round of CONCACAF qualification. Disillusioned and believing that his best years had been wasted with the team, Hutchinson would later say that "in my head, I was done. I wasn't coming back to Canada, I swear."

After declining to participate in 2016 and 2017 friendly matches and missing the 2017 CONCACAF Gold Cup, Hutchinson was persuaded to rejoin by coach John Herdman, newly arrived from Canada's much more successful women's national team. Herdman believed Hutchinson would add a valuable veteran presence to a team of up-and-coming talents like Alphonso Davies and Jonathan David. Upon his recall to the team in October 2018, he indicated he was looking to retire from the Canadian national team after the 2019 CONCACAF Gold Cup. He was named to the squad for that tournament on 30 May 2019.

Hutchinson however remained active for Canada, and in March 2021 he accepted a call-up for 2022 FIFA World Cup qualifiers against Bermuda and the Cayman Islands. This new cycle was far more successful than any he had seen before, and they reached the final stage for the first time in a quarter century. Hutchinson said "this time around we've got a team that is full of talent". On 16 November 2021, Hutchinson captained Canada to a 2–1 victory over Mexico at Commonwealth Stadium in Edmonton, which also marked his 90th appearance for his country, surpassing Julian De Guzman as the all-time appearance leader for the men's national team. On 27 March, Canada officially qualified for the World Cup with a 4–0 victory over Jamaica at BMO Field in Toronto. Hutchinson later described returning for this qualifying cycle and breaking the appearance record as particularly meaningful, saying that he had previously considered ending his international career but decided to remain with the team and that having the record was "special".

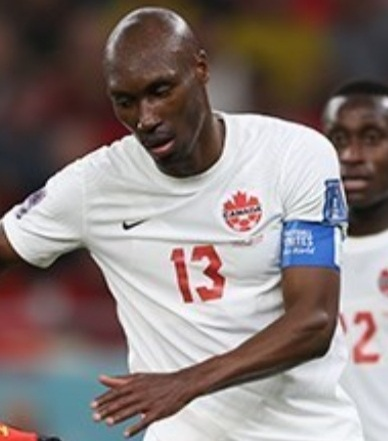
Hutchinson playing for Canada at the 2022 FIFA World Cup

After he suffered a bone bruise that scuppered the beginning of his club season in the fall of 2022, there was doubt as to whether Hutchinson would be ready to participate in the World Cup. Herdman said it was "a tough situation for him. Because I think for all of us he just means so much to the team." However, he recovered sufficiently and in November 2022 he was named to Canada's 26-man squad for the 2022 FIFA World Cup.

Acknowledging Hutchinson's importance to the national team through the preceding twenty years, TSN remarked that "the country's return to the World Cup is the crowning achievement in his incomparable career." Hutchinson was also the eldest outfielder to play at the 2022 World Cup. On 27 November, he played his 100th match for Canada in a 4–1 defeat against Croatia during the World Cup, becoming the first male Canadian to achieve this feat. In Canada's last match of the tournament, having already been eliminated, a would-be equalizing header from Hutchinson was tucked under the crossbar but failed to cross the goal line, as Canada were eventually defeated 2–1 by Morocco, failing to take any points from their group matches.

In June 2023 Hutchinson was named to the 23-man squad contesting the 2023 CONCACAF Nations League Finals. He indicated in an interview with The Athletic that this tournament would likely be his last with Canada. Canada defeated Panama in the semi-final 2–0, reaching the event final. This was the first event final of Hutchinson's international career, and the first for the national team in 23 years.

In the later stages of his international career, Hutchinson expressed pride in mentoring younger Canada players such as Alphonso Davies and Jonathan David and said that he hoped to move into a coaching role after retirement in order to give back to the next generation. Hutchinson confirmed his retirement from international soccer on 17 June 2023.

== Personal life ==
Atiba Hutchinson is married to a French-Iranian woman named Sarah, whom he met while playing in Denmark. Together they have three sons, Noah (born 2015), Nava (born 2016) and Ayo Siyah (2017), all of whom were born in Istanbul. In April 2022, he joined the ownership group of League1 Ontario club Simcoe County Rovers FC.

Hutchinson has described former Canada forward Iain Hume as one of his closest friends, noting that they first met as youth players for rival clubs in the Brampton area before becoming teammates and regular roommates on national team trips. Hume has called Hutchinson "the best ever" Canadian player and "one of those ultimate pros", praising both his on-field quality and his character.

== Career statistics ==
=== Club ===
Appearances and goals by club, season and competition
| Club | Season | League | | | National cup | | Continental | | Other | | Total | |
| Club | Season | Division | Apps | Goals | Apps | Goals | Apps | Goals | Apps | Goals | Apps | Goals |
|---|---|---|---|---|---|---|---|---|---|---|---|---|
| York Region Shooters | 2002 | CPSL | 2 | 0 | 0 | 0 | — | | — | | 2 | 0 |
| Toronto Lynx | 2002 | USL First Division | 4 | 0 | 0 | 0 | — | | — | | 4 | 0 |
| Öster | 2003 | Allsvenskan | 24 | 6 | | | — | | — | | 24 | 6 |
| Helsingborg | 2004 | Allsvenskan | 24 | 0 | | | — | | — | | 24 | 0 |
| Helsingborg | 2005 | Allsvenskan | 25 | 6 | | | — | | — | | 25 | 6 |
| Helsingborg | Total | | 49 | 6 | | | — | | — | | 49 | 6 |
| Copenhagen | 2005–06 | Danish Superliga | 13 | 1 | 1 | 0 | — | | 8 | 1 | 22 | 2 |
| Copenhagen | 2006–07 | Danish Superliga | 32 | 4 | 5 | 1 | 10 (Note: Appearance(s) in UEFA Champions League) | 1 | 8 | 1 | 55 | 7 |
| Copenhagen | 2007–08 | Danish Superliga | 31 | 8 | 5 | 0 | 10 (Note: Four appearances and one goal in UEFA Champions League, six appearances in UEFA Cup) | 1 | — | | 46 | 9 |
| Copenhagen | 2008–09 | Danish Superliga | 33 | 6 | 3 | 0 | 12 (Note: Appearances in UEFA Cup) | 2 | — | | 48 | 8 |
| Copenhagen | 2009–10 | Danish Superliga | 30 | 3 | 2 | 0 | 12 (Note: Four appearances in UEFA Champions League, eight appearances in UEFA Europa League) | 0 | — | | 44 | 3 |
| Copenhagen | Total | | 139 | 22 | 16 | 1 | 44 | 4 | 16 | 2 | 215 | 29 |
| PSV Eindhoven | 2010–11 | Eredivisie | 33 | 2 | 4 | 0 | 13 (Note: Appearance(s) in UEFA Europa League) | 0 | — | | 50 | 2 |
| PSV Eindhoven | 2011–12 | Eredivisie | 14 | 0 | 3 | 0 | 4 | 0 | — | | 21 | 0 |
| PSV Eindhoven | 2012–13 | Eredivisie | 33 | 2 | 4 | 0 | 6 | 0 | 1 (Note: Appearance in Johan Cruyff Shield) | 0 | 44 | 2 |
| PSV Eindhoven | Total | | 80 | 4 | 11 | 0 | 23 | 0 | 1 | 0 | 115 | 4 |
| Beşiktaş | 2013–14 | Süper Lig | 30 | 1 | 1 | 0 | 2 | 0 | — | | 33 | 1 |
| Beşiktaş | 2014–15 | Süper Lig | 30 | 2 | 3 | 0 | 10 (Note: Three appearances in UEFA Champions League, seven appearances in UEFA Europa League) | 0 | — | | 43 | 2 |
| Beşiktaş | 2015–16 | Süper Lig | 34 | 2 | 3 | 0 | 6 | 0 | — | | 43 | 2 |
| Beşiktaş | 2016–17 | Süper Lig | 28 | 1 | 1 | 0 | 11 (Note: Six appearances in UEFA Champions League, five appearances and one goal in UEFA Europa League) | 1 | 1 (Note: Appearance in Turkish Super Cup) | 0 | 41 | 2 |
| Beşiktaş | 2017–18 | Süper Lig | 25 | 2 | 1 | 0 | 7 | 0 | 1 | 0 | 34 | 2 |
| Beşiktaş | 2018–19 | Süper Lig | 27 | 4 | 0 | 0 | 0 | 0 | — | | 27 | 4 |
| Beşiktaş | 2019–20 | Süper Lig | 30 | 6 | 1 | 0 | 1 | 0 | — | | 32 | 6 |
| Beşiktaş | 2020–21 | Süper Lig | 36 | 4 | 3 | 0 | 1 | 0 | — | | 40 | 4 |
| Beşiktaş | 2021–22 | Süper Lig | 25 | 1 | 3 | 1 | 4 | 0 | 1 | 1 | 33 | 3 |
| Beşiktaş | 2022–23 | Süper Lig | 5 | 1 | 3 | 0 | — | | — | | 8 | 1 |
| Beşiktaş | Total | | 270 | 24 | 19 | 1 | 42 | 1 | 3 | 1 | 334 | 27 |
| Career total | | | 568 | 62 | 46 | 2 | 109 | 5 | 20 | 3 | 743 | 72 |

=== International ===
Appearances and goals by national team and year
| National team | Year | Apps | Goals |
|---|---|---|---|
| Canada | 2003 | 4 | 0 |
| Canada | 2004 | 7 | 1 |
| Canada | 2005 | 7 | 1 |
| Canada | 2006 | 4 | 0 |
| Canada | 2007 | 9 | 1 |
| Canada | 2008 | 9 | 0 |
| Canada | 2009 | 7 | 0 |
| Canada | 2010 | 3 | 1 |
| Canada | 2011 | 5 | 0 |
| Canada | 2012 | 7 | 0 |
| Canada | 2013 | 3 | 0 |
| Canada | 2014 | 4 | 1 |
| Canada | 2015 | 4 | 1 |
| Canada | 2016 | 4 | 0 |
| Canada | 2017 | 1 | 0 |
| Canada | 2018 | 2 | 1 |
| Canada | 2019 | 4 | 0 |
| Canada | 2020 | 0 | 0 |
| Canada | 2021 | 6 | 1 |
| Canada | 2022 | 11 | 1 |
| Canada | 2023 | 3 | 0 |
| Total | | 104 | 9 |

104 official "A" matches does not include a "B" match against Trinidad and Tobago in 2019
Canada score listed first, score column indicates score after each Hutchinson goal.

List of international goals scored by Atiba Hutchinson
| No. | Date | Venue | Cap | Opponent | Score | Result | Competition |
|---|---|---|---|---|---|---|---|
| 1 | 9 October 2004 | Estadio Olímpico Metropolitano, San Pedro Sula, Honduras | 9 | Honduras | 1–0 | 1–1 | 2006 FIFA World Cup qualification |
| 2 | 12 July 2005 | Gillette Stadium, Foxborough, United States | 16 | Cuba | 2–0 | 2–1 | 2005 CONCACAF Gold Cup |
| 3 | 25 March 2007 | Bermuda National Stadium, Devonshire Parish, Bermuda | 23 | Bermuda | 1–0 | 3–0 | Friendly |
| 4 | 8 October 2010 | Lobanovskyi Dynamo Stadium, Kyiv, Ukraine | 50 | Ukraine | 2–0 | 2–2 | Friendly |
| 5 | 23 May 2014 | Sonnenseestation, Ritzing, Austria | 66 | Bulgaria | 1–1 | 1–1 | Friendly |
| 6 | 4 September 2015 | BMO Field, Toronto, Canada | 70 | Belize | 3–0 | 3–0 | 2018 FIFA World Cup qualification |
| 7 | 18 November 2018 | Warner Park, Basseterre, Saint Kitts and Nevis | 80 | Saint Kitts and Nevis | 1–0 | 1–0 | 2019–20 CONCACAF Nations League qualification |
| 8 | 8 September 2021 | BMO Field, Toronto, Canada | 88 | El Salvador | 1–0 | 3–0 | 2022 FIFA World Cup qualification |
| 9 | 2 February 2022 | Estadio Cuscatlán, San Salvador, El Salvador | 92 | El Salvador | 1–0 | 2–0 | 2022 FIFA World Cup qualification |

== Honours ==
Copenhagen

- Danish Superliga: 2005–06, 2006–07, 2008–09, 2009–10
- Danish Cup: 2008–09
- Royal League: 2005–06

PSV

- KNVB Cup: 2011–12
- Johan Cruyff Shield: 2012

Beşiktaş

- Süper Lig: 2015–16, 2016–17, 2020–21
- Turkish Cup: 2020–21
- Turkish Super Cup: 2021

Individual

- East Front Trophy: voted player of the year by supporters of Östers IF in 2003.
- Danish Superliga Player of the Year: 2009–10
- Canadian Player of the Year: 2010, 2012, 2014, 2015, 2016, 2017
- CONCACAF Best XI: 2016
- FC Copenhagen All Time Best XI - 100th Anniversary fan vote
- Canada Soccer President's Award: 2023
- Canadian Soccer Association: All-Time Canada XI
- Süper Lig Team of the Season: 2015–16, 2016–17, 2020–21

== See also ==
- List of men's footballers with 100 or more international caps
