= Orkan Çınar =

Turkish footballer

Personal information
- Full name: Orkan Çınar
- Date of birth: 29 January 1996 (age 30)
- Place of birth: Dortmund, Germany
- Height: 1.74 m (5 ft 9 in)
- Positions: Winger; left back

Youth career
- –2010: Füchse Berlin Reinickendorf
- 2010–2011: Tennis Borussia Berlin
- 2011–2014: VfL Wolfsburg

Senior career*
Years	Team	Apps	(Gls)
2014–2015	Greuther Fürth II	5	(1)
2014–2015	Greuther Fürth	2	(0)
2015	→ Gaziantepspor (loan)	3	(0)
2015–2017	Gaziantepspor	44	(4)
2017–2020	Beşiktaş	3	(0)
2018	→ Konyaspor (loan)	9	(1)
2018–2019	→ Adana Demirspor (loan)	12	(2)
2020–2021	Ankaragücü	20	(0)
2021	Adanaspor	5	(0)
2023–2024	İnegöl Kafkas Gençlikspor	23	(6)
2024	Sarıyer	0	(0)
2024–2025	BFC Preussen	6	(0)
2025	Adanaspor	18	(2)

International career
2012	Turkey U16	6	(4)
2012–2013	Turkey U17	10	(1)
2013–2014	Turkey U18	8	(1)
2014	Turkey U19	5	(0)
2015	Turkey U20	3	(0)
2015–2018	Turkey U21	14	(4)
- * Club domestic league appearances and goals

Orkan Çınar (born 29 January 1996) is a Turkish former footballer.

== Club career ==
Çınar joined SpVgg Greuther Fürth in 2014 from VfL Wolfsburg. He made his 2. Bundesliga debut at 24 August 2014 against FC Ingolstadt 04. He replaced Tom Weilandt after 77 minutes in a 2-0 away loss.
