= Burak Ağaoğlu =

Turkish footballer

Personal information
- Date of birth: 23 March 1999 (age 27)
- Place of birth: Adapazarı, Turkey
- Position: Midfielder

Team information
- Current team: Arapgir Spor

Youth career
- 2011–2013: Erdenlerspor
- 2013–2017: Ankaraspor

Senior career*
Years	Team	Apps	(Gls)
2017–2019	Ankaraspor	1	(0)
2018	→ Mamak (loan)	3	(0)
2019–2020	Altındağspor	1	(0)
2020	Erbaaspor	1	(0)
2020–2021	Sultanbeyli Belediyespor	2	(0)
2021	İskenderun	0	(0)
2021–2022	Bartınspor		
2022–	Arapgir Spor		
- * Club domestic league appearances and goals as of 16:52, 29 April 2021 (UTC)

Burak Ağaoğlu (born 23 March 1999) is a Turkish footballer who plays as a midfielder for the amateur side Arapgir Spor.

== Career ==
A youth product of Ankaraspor, Ağaoğlu signed his first contract with the team in 2017. He made his professional debut for Ankaraspor in a 4-0 loss to Beşiktaş on 3 June 2017. He shortly after moved on loan with Mamak in the TFF Third League. In 2019, he transferred to Altındağspor, and thereafter had stints with Erbaaspor, Sultanbeyli Belediyespor, and İskenderun.
