= Eslem Öztürk =

Turkish footballer (born 1997)

Personal information
- Date of birth: 1 December 1997 (age 28)
- Place of birth: Gölcük, Turkey
- Height: 1.77 m (5 ft 10 in)
- Position: Midfielder

Team information
- Current team: Erbaaspor
- Number: 20

Senior career*
Years	Team	Apps	(Gls)
2015–2017	Beşiktaş	0	(0)
2017	→ BB Erzurumspor (loan)	14	(1)
2017–2024	İstanbulspor	110	(6)
2024–2025	1461 Trabzon	33	(4)
2025–2026	Kırklarelispor	22	(0)
2026–	Erbaaspor	3	(0)

International career^{‡}
2015	Turkey U18	1	(0)
2018	Turkey U20	4	(0)
2018	Turkey U21	1	(0)
- * Club domestic league appearances and goals as of 1 October 2026 ‡ National team caps and goals as of 7 September 2018

Eslem Öztürk (born 1 December 1997) is a Turkish professional footballer who plays as a midfielder for TFF 2. Lig club Erbaaspor.
