= Atınç Nukan =

Turkish footballer

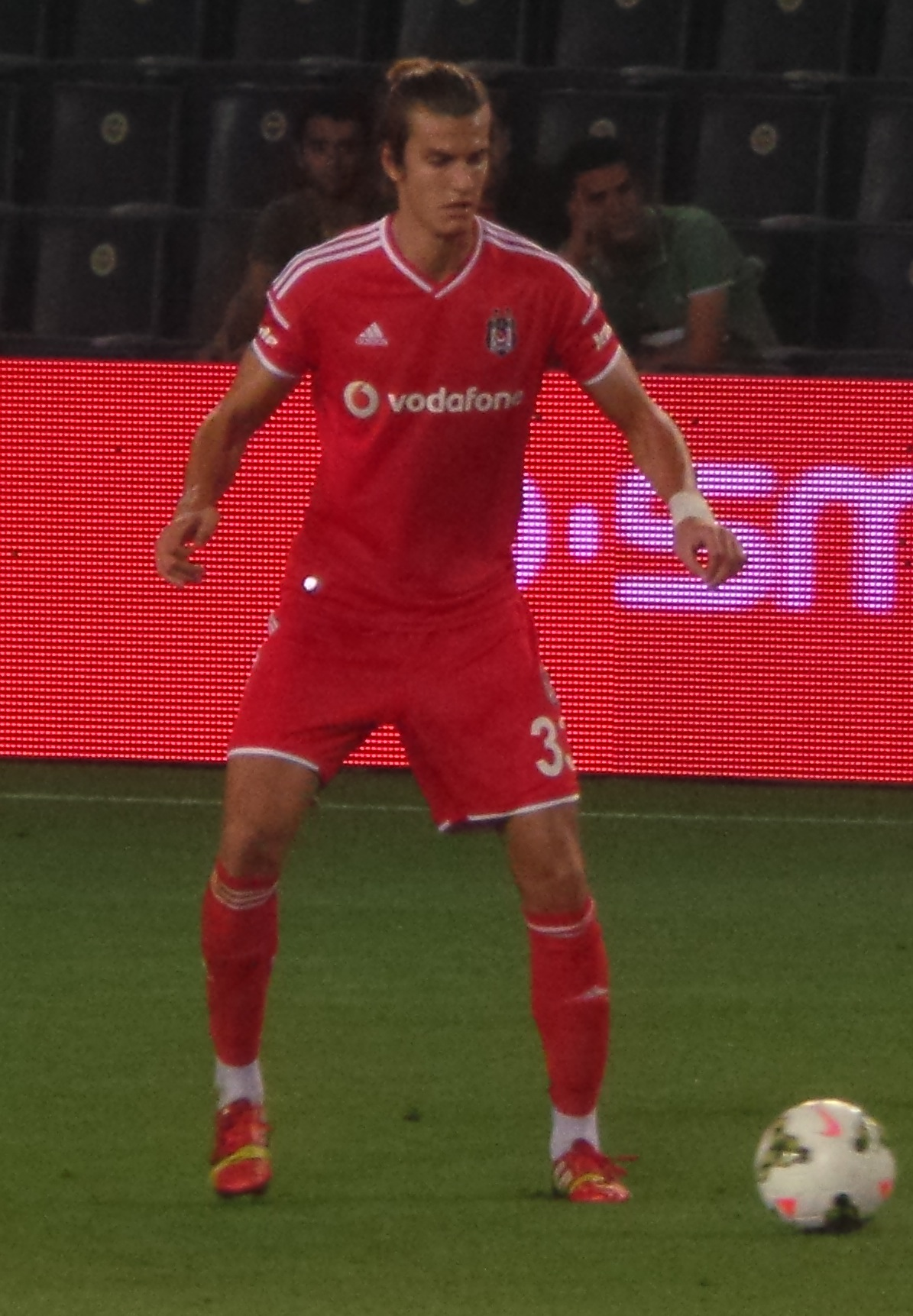
- Nukan playing for Beşiktaş in 2014

Personal information
- Date of birth: 20 July 1993 (age 33)
- Place of birth: Fatih, Istanbul, Turkey
- Height: 1.96 m (6 ft 5 in)
- Position: Centre-back

Team information
- Current team: Fatih Karagümrük
- Number: 3

Youth career
- 2004–2006: Küçükçekmecespor
- 2006–2010: Beşiktaş

Senior career*
Years	Team	Apps	(Gls)
2010–2015	Beşiktaş	12	(0)
2013–2014	→ Dardanelspor (loan)	19	(1)
2015–2019	RB Leipzig	12	(1)
2016–2018	→ Beşiktaş (loan)	8	(1)
2019–2024	Göztepe	99	(10)
2024–2026	Bandırmaspor	70	(6)
2026–	Fatih Karagümrük	3	(0)

International career^{‡}
2010	Turkey U17	1	(0)
2012	Turkey U19	4	(0)
2014	Turkey U21	10	(1)
2015	Turkey	1	(0)
- * Club domestic league appearances and goals as of 19 October 2026 ‡ National team caps and goals as of 2 August 2022

Atınç Nukan (born 20 July 1993) is a Turkish professional footballer who plays as a centre-back for TFF 1. Lig club Fatih Karagümrük.

== Club career ==
Nukan began his career as a youth player for Beşiktaş. He made his professional debut on 7 May 2010 against Manisaspor, coming on shortly before half-time. In July 2015, Nukan signed five-year contract with German club RB Leipzig for €6 million. On 30 August 2016, Nukan returned to his former team Beşiktaş for one year on loan.

== International career ==
He was called up to the national team by manager Fatih Terim for two friendlies in November 2015 against Qatar and Greece. He started in the game against Qatar in Doha where Turkey won 2–1.

== Statistics ==
=== Club ===
As of 2 August 2022

Appearances and goals by club, season and competition
Club	Season	League			Cup (Note: Includes Turkish Cup and DFB-Pokal)		Continental (Note: Includes UEFA Champions League and UEFA Europa League)		Other (Note: Includes Turkish Super Cup and DFL-Supercup)		Total	
Club	Season	Division	Apps	Goals	Apps	Goals	Apps	Goals	Apps	Goals	Apps	Goals
Beşiktaş	2009–10	Süper Lig	1	0	0	0	0	0	—		1	0
Beşiktaş	2010–11	Süper Lig	2	0	1	0	0	0	—		3	0
Beşiktaş	2011–12	Süper Lig	0	0	0	0	0	0	—		0	0
Beşiktaş	2012–13	Süper Lig	0	0	0	0	0	0	—		0	0
Beşiktaş	2013–14	Süper Lig	0	0	0	0	0	0	—		0	0
Beşiktaş	2014–15	Süper Lig	9	0	7	1	1	0	0	0	17	1
Beşiktaş	Total		12	0	8	1	1	0	0	0	21	1
Çanakkale Dardanelspor (loan)	2013–14	TFF Second League	19	1	1	0	—		—		20	1
RB Leipzig	2015–16	2. Bundesliga	12	1	2	0	—		—		14	1
RB Leipzig	2016–17	Bundesliga	0	0	0	0	—		—		0	0
RB Leipzig	2017–18	Bundesliga	0	0	0	0	0	0	—		0	0
RB Leipzig	2018–19	Bundesliga	0	0	0	0	0	0	—		0	0
RB Leipzig	Total		12	1	2	0	0	0	—		14	1
Beşiktaş (loan)	2016–17	Süper Lig	8	1	6	0	2	0	0	0	16	1
Beşiktaş (loan)	2017–18	Süper Lig	0	0	0	0	0	0	0	0	0	0
Beşiktaş (loan)	Total		8	1	6	0	2	0	0	0	16	1
Göztepe	2019–20	Süper Lig	6	0	3	1	—		—		9	1
Göztepe	2020–21	Süper Lig	27	2	1	0	—		—		28	2
Göztepe	2021–22	Süper Lig	20	3	2	0	—		—		22	3
Göztepe	Total		53	5	6	1	—		—		59	5
Career total			104	8	23	2	3	0	0	0	130	10

=== International ===
As of 2 August 2022

National team	Season	Apps	Goals
Turkey
Turkey	2015	1	0
Total		1	0

== Honours ==
Beşiktaş J.K.

- Süper Lig: 2016–17
- Turkish Cup: 2010–11
