= Oğuzhan Aydoğan =

German footballer

Personal information
- Date of birth: 4 February 1997 (age 29)
- Place of birth: Marl, Germany
- Height: 1.75 m (5 ft 9 in)
- Position: Midfielder

Team information
- Current team: Ümraniyespor
- Number: 28

Youth career
- 2001–2008: TSV Marl-Hüls
- 2008–2014: Schalke 04
- 2014–2016: Borussia Dortmund
- 2016–2017: Beşiktaş

Senior career*
Years	Team	Apps	(Gls)
2016–2020	Beşiktaş	0	(0)
2017–2018	→ Karlsruher SC (loan)	1	(0)
2020–2021	Alemannia Aachen	22	(5)
2021–2022	Ankaraspor	9	(0)
2022–2023	Menemen	38	(2)
2023–2024	Düzcespor	32	(3)
2024–2025	Gostivar	28	(5)
2025	Bashkimi	12	(0)
2026	Makedonija GP	13	(3)
2026–	Ümraniyespor	2	(0)

International career
2011–2012	Germany U15	4	(1)
2012–2013	Germany U16	8	(2)
2013–2014	Germany U17	10	(1)
- * Club domestic league appearances and goals as of 8 November 2026

Oğuzhan Aydoğan (born 4 February 1997) is a German professional footballer who plays as a midfielder for Turkish TFF 1. Lig club Ümraniyespor.

== Club career ==
On 12 November 2020, Aydoğan signed for Alemannia Aachen having previously left Beşiktaş during the summer of 2020.
