= 2012–13 Beşiktaş J.K. season =

Beşiktaş J.K.
2012–13 season
- President: Fikret Orman
- Head coach: Samet Aybaba
- Stadium: BJK İnönü Stadium
- Süper Lig: 3rd
- Turkish Cup: Fifth round (v. Antalyaspor)
- Top goalscorer: League: Hugo Almeida (9); All: Hugo Almeida (10)
Home colours	Away colours	Third colours

The 2012–13 season will be the 109th year of Beşiktaş J.K. and their 55th consecutive year in the Süper Lig.

== Squad ==
Players and squad numbers last updated on 13 February 2013. Note: Flags indicate national team as has been defined under FIFA eligibility rules. Players may hold more than one non-FIFA nationality.

No.	Name	Nationality	Position	Date of Birth (Age)	Signed from	Signed in
Goalkeepers
1	Cenk Gönen	(Turkey)	GK	21 February 1988 (age 38)	Denizlispor	2010
23	Allan McGregor	(Scotland)	GK	31 January 1982 (age 44)	(Scotland) Rangers	2012
99	Emre Metin	(Turkey)	GK	7 February 1993 (age 33)	Youth System	2012
Defenders
3	İsmail Köybaşı	(Turkey)	LB	10 July 1989 (age 37)	Gaziantepspor	2009
5	İbrahim Toraman (C)	(Turkey)	CB	19 November 1981 (age 44)	Gaziantepspor	2004
6	Tomáš Sivok	(Czech Republic)	CB	15 September 1983 (age 43)	(Italy) Udinese	2008
13	Roberto Hilbert	(Germany)	RB	15 October 1984 (age 42)	(Germany) VfB Stuttgart	2010
14	Julien Escudé	(France)	CB	17 August 1979 (age 47)	(Spain) Sevilla	2012
19	Gökhan Süzen	(Turkey)	LB	12 July 1987 (age 39)	İstanbul B.B.	2013
22	Ersan Gülüm	(Turkey)	CB	17 May 1987 (age 39)	Adanaspor	2011
24	Emre Özkan	(Turkey)	LB	24 December 1988 (age 37)	Youth System	2006
25	Uğur Boral	(Turkey)	LB	14 April 1982 (age 44)	Samsunspor	2012
28	Mehmet Akgün	(Turkey)	RB	16 August 1986 (age 40)	Gençlerbirliği	2012
35	Koray Yıldız	(Turkey)	LB	16 February 1995 (age 31)	Youth System	2012
93	Atınç Nukan	(Turkey)	CB	20 July 1993 (age 33)	Youth System	2010
Midfielders
4	Manuel Fernandes	(Portugal)	CM	5 February 1986 (age 40)	(Spain) Valencia	2011
8	Veli Kavlak	(Austria)	DM	3 November 1988 (age 38)	(Austria) Rapid Wien	2011
10	Olcay Şahan	(Turkey)	LW	26 May 1987 (age 39)	(Germany) 1. FC Kaiserslautern	2012
15	Oğuzhan Özyakup	(Turkey)	CM	23 September 1992 (age 34)	(England) Arsenal	2012
20	Necip Uysal (VC)	(Turkey)	CM	24 January 1991 (age 35)	Youth System	2008
30	Hasan Türk	(Turkey)	DM	20 March 1993 (age 33)	Youth System	2012
39	Erkan Kaş	(Turkey)	LW	10 September 1991 (age 35)	Youth System	2012
80	Muhammed Demirci	(Turkey)	AM	3 January 1995 (age 31)	Youth System	2010
Forwards
7	Dentinho	(Brazil)	CF	19 January 1989 (age 37)	(Ukraine) Shakhtar Donetsk	2013
9	Hugo Almeida	(Portugal)	ST	23 May 1984 (age 42)	(Germany) Werder Bremen	2011
11	Mustafa Pektemek	(Turkey)	ST	11 August 1988 (age 38)	Gençlerbirliği	2011
17	Mehmet Akyüz	(Turkey)	CF	2 January 1986 (age 40)	Tavşanlı Linyitspor	2011
26	Sinan Kurumuş	(Turkey)	CF	2 August 1994 (age 32)	Ankaragücü	2013
96	Daanyaal Mohamed	(South Africa)	ST	9 June 1991 (age 35)	2012	
37	Filip Hološko	(Slovakia)	RW	17 January 1984 (age 42)	Manisaspor	2008
53	Mamadou Niang	(Senegal)	ST	13 October 1979 (age 47)	(Qatar) Al Sadd	2013
Players left during the season
18	Kadir Arı	(Turkey)	RW	27 November 1994 (age 31)	Youth System	2012
21	Mertcan Aktaş	(Turkey)	ST	15 October 1994 (age 32)	Youth System	2012
34	Batuhan Karadeniz	(Turkey)	ST	24 April 1991 (age 35)	Eskişehirspor	2012
66	Tanju Kayhan	(Austria)	LB	22 July 1989 (age 37)	(Austria) Rapid Wien	2011
77	Rıdvan Şimşek	(Turkey)	RB	17 January 1991 (age 35)	Karşıyaka	2009
	Burak Kaplan	(Turkey)	RW	1 February 1990 (age 36)	(Germany) Bayer Leverkusen	2011

=== Out on loan ===
Note: Flags indicate national team as defined under FIFA eligibility rules; some limited exceptions apply. Players may hold more than one non-FIFA nationality.

No.	Pos.	Nation	Player
2	DF	TUR	Berat Çetinkaya (at Adana Demirspor until 30 June 2013)
90	GK	TUR	Umut Kaya (at Denizlispor)
—	MF	POR	Júlio Alves (at Sporting CP B until 30 June 2013)

== Transfers ==
=== In ===
No.	Pos.	Nat.	Name	Age	Moving from	Type	Transfer window	Ends	Transfer fee	Source
30	GK	(Scotland)	Allan McGregor	30	Rangers (Scotland)	Transfer	Summer	2014	Free	
2	DF	(Turkey)	Berat Çetinkaya	21	Sakaryaspor	Transfer	Summer	2016	€210,000	
14	DF	(France)	Julien Escudé	32	Sevilla (Spain)	Transfer	Summer	2014	Free	
28	MF	(Turkey)	Mehmet Akgün	25	Gençlerbirliği	Transfer	Summer	2014	Free	
10	MF	(Turkey)	Olcay Şahan	25	1. FC Kaiserslautern (Germany)	Transfer	Summer	2016	€800,000	
15	MF	(Turkey)	Oğuzhan Özyakup	19	Arsenal (England)	Transfer	Summer	2016	€500,000	
25	MF	(Turkey)	Uğur Boral	30	Samsunspor	Transfer	Summer	2015	Free	
34	FW	(Turkey)	Batuhan Karadeniz	21	Eskişehirspor	Loan	Summer	2013	€250,000	
	GK	(Turkey)	Burak Mazak	18	Kozan Belediyespor	Transfer	Summer	2015	Free	
	GK	(Turkey)	Emre Tali	17	Çaykur Rizespor	Transfer	Summer	2015	Undisclosed	
26	FW	(Turkey)	Sinan Kurumuş	18	Ankaragücü	Transfer	Winter	2017	€150K	
	MF	(Turkey)	Gökhan Süzen	25	İstanbul B.B.	Transfer	Winter	2016	€1,100,000	

Total spending: ▼€3,000,000

=== Out ===
No.	Pos.	Nat.	Name	Age	Moving to	Type	Transfer window	Transfer fee	Source
1	GK	(Turkey)	Rüştü Reçber	39	Retired	Transfer	Summer	Free	
27	DF	(Brazil)	Sidnei	22	Benfica (Portugal)	Transfer	Summer	End of loan	
33	FW	(Brazil)	Edu	30	Schalke 04 (Germany)	Transfer	Summer	End of loan	
10	FW	(Portugal)	Bébé	21	Manchester United (England)	Transfer	Summer	End of loan	
15	MF	(Turkey)	Mehmet Aurélio	34	Free agent	Transfer	Summer	Free	
87	GK	(Turkey)	Korcan Çelikay	24	Sivasspor	Transfer	Summer	€90,000	
55	DF	(Turkey)	Egemen Korkmaz	30	Fenerbahçe	Transfer	Summer	Free	
17	MF	(Austria)	Ekrem Dağ	31	Gaziantepspor	Transfer	Summer	Free	
28	MF	(Germany)	Fabian Ernst	33	Kasımpaşa	Transfer	Summer	Free	
	DF	(Turkey)	Sezer Özmen	20	Çaykur Rizespor	Transfer	Summer	€75,000	
	MF	(Turkey)	Cumali Bişi	19	Çaykur Rizespor	Transfer	Summer	€75,000	
20	MF	(Portugal)	Simão	32	Espanyol (Spain)	Transfer	Summer	Free	
92	DF	(Turkey)	Furkan Şeker	20	Göztepe	Transfer	Summer	€100,000	
7	MF	(Portugal)	Ricardo Quaresma	26	Free agent	Transfer	Winter	Free	

== Competitions ==
=== Legend ===
Win	Draw	Loss

=== Pre-season friendlies ===
16 July 2012	Austria Klagenfurt	2–4	Beşiktaş	Austria
	Fidjeu 48'; Sand 85'		Arı 31'; Kaplan 39'; Akyüz 51'; Kaş 65'

20 July 2012	Manchester City	2–0	Beşiktaş	Innsbruck, Austria
18:30 CEST (UTC+02:00)	Agüero 45'; Kompany 56'	Report		Stadium: Tivoli-Neu

22 July 2012	Maccabi Haifa	2–0	Beşiktaş	Austria
	Katan 7'; Ezra 56'

24 July 2012	Jagiellonia Białystok	1–1	Beşiktaş	Austria
	Cionek 42'		Demirci 60'

29 July 2012	Beşiktaş	3–0	Sarıyer	Istanbul, Turkey
	Kavlak 26'; Akyüz 38'; Arı 77'

1 August 2012	Kırklarelispor	1–7	Beşiktaş	Kırklareli, Turkey
	Sezer 72'		Escudé 26'; Şahan 54', 79'; Sivok 68'; Almeida 71', 85'; Aktaş 90'	Stadium: Kırklareli Atatürk Stadyumu

4 August 2012	Kartalspor	0–1	Beşiktaş	Istanbul, Turkey
			Pektemek 90'	Stadium: Kartal Stadium

11 October 2012	Alanyaspor	0–3	Beşiktaş	Alanya, Turkey
			Escudé 48'; Almeida 64'; Karadeniz 68'	Stadium: Alanya Milli Egemenlik

=== Süper Lig ===
19 August 2012 1	İstanbul BB	1–1	Beşiktaş	Istanbul
20:00 EEST (UTC+3)	Haspolatlı 59'	Summary	Almeida 83'	Stadium: Atatürk Olympic Stadium; Referee: Özgür Yankaya

26 August 2012 2	Beşiktaş	3–3	Galatasaray	Istanbul
21:45 EEST (UTC+3)	Melo 8' (o.g.); Hološko 43', 51'	Summary	Elmander 20'; Bulut 45'; İnan 86' (pen.)	Stadium: BJK İnönü Stadium; Referee: Bülent Yıldırım

1 September 2012 3	Karabükspor	0–3	Beşiktaş	Karabük
20:30 EEST (UTC+3)		Summary	Fernandes 5', 34'; Boral 30'	Stadium: Yenişehir Stadium; Referee: İlker Meral

17 September 2012 4	Beşiktaş	3–0	Elazığspor	Istanbul
20:00 EEST (UTC+3)	Uysal 49'; Sivok 64'; Hilbert 72'	Summary		Stadium: BJK İnönü Stadium; Referee: Kuddusi Müftüoğlu

22 September 2012 5	Gaziantepspor	3–2	Beşiktaş	Gaziantep
20:00 EEST (UTC+3)	Sosa 49'; Tosun 76' (pen.); Gülle 90'	Summary	Şahan 15'; Almeida 67'	Stadium: Kamil Ocak Stadyumu; Referee: Yunus Yıldırım

1 October 2012 6	Beşiktaş	0–1	Sivasspor	Istanbul
20:00 EEST (UTC+3)		Summary	Chahechouhe 61'	Stadium: BJK İnönü Stadium; Referee: Mete Kalkavan

7 October 2012 7	Fenerbahçe	3–0	Beşiktaş	Istanbul
19:00 EEST (UTC+3)	Sow 13'; Gönül 40', 59'	Summary	Kavlak (yellow card) 52' (yellow-red card) 56'	Stadium: Şükrü Saracoğlu Stadium; Referee: Özgür Yankaya

21 October 2012 8	Beşiktaş	1–1	Trabzonspor	Istanbul
19:00 EEST (UTC+3)	Fernandes 55'	Summary	Sapara 45'	Stadium: BJK İnönü Stadium; Referee: Cüneyt Çakır

26 October 2012 9	Kasımpaşa	1–3	Beşiktaş	Istanbul
20:00 EEST (UTC+3)	Hurmacı 36'	Summary	Almeida 14'; Fernandes 26'; Sivok 53'	Stadium: Recep Tayyip Erdoğan Stadium; Referee: Tolga Özkalfa

4 November 2012 10	Beşiktaş	3–0	Mersin İdman Yurdu	Istanbul
19:00 EET (UTC+2)	Almeida 6' (pen.); Özyakup (yellow card) 19' (yellow-red card) 49', (goal) 31'; Hološko 45'	Summary		Stadium: BJK İnönü Stadium; Referee: Barış Şimşek

9 November 2012 11	Beşiktaş	3–3	Bursaspor	Istanbul
20:00 EET (UTC+2)	Şahan 52'; Hološko 57'; Almeida 67' (pen.)	Summary	Šesták 28'; Öztürk 59'; Batalla 76'	Stadium: BJK İnönü Stadium; Referee: Fırat Aydınus

18 November 2012 12	Antalyaspor	3–5	Beşiktaş	Antalya
19:00 EET (UTC+2)	Promise 21'; Diarra 50'; Şişmanoğlu 83'	Summary	Almeida 6', 43', 69'; Şahan 47'; Fernandes 90+4'	Stadium: Mardan Sports Complex; Referee: Yunus Yıldırım

23 November 2012 13	Beşiktaş	3–1	Akhisar Belediyespor	Istanbul
20:00 EET (UTC+2)	Hološko 3', 7'; Hilbert 40'	Summary	Aşan 63'	Stadium: BJK İnönü Stadium; Referee: Halis Özkahya

1 December 2012 14	Orduspor	1–2	Beşiktaş	Ordu
19:00 EET (UTC+2)	Kabze 24'	Summary	Toraman 34'; Özyakup 54'	Stadium: 19 Eylül Stadium; Referee: Mustafa Abitoglu

7 December 2012 15	Beşiktaş	2–2	Eskişehirspor	Istanbul
20:00 EET (UTC+2)	Hološko 6'; Almeida 66'	Summary	Ateş 82' (pen.); Nuhiu 90'	Stadium: BJK İnönü Stadium; Referee: Barış Şimşek

15 December 2012 16	Gençlerbirliği	1–1	Beşiktaş	Ankara
19:00 EET (UTC+2)	Kulušić 19'	Summary	Şahan 35'	Stadium: 19 Mayıs Stadium; Referee: Suat Arslanboga

21 December 2012 17	Beşiktaş	3–1	Kayserispor	Istanbul
20:00 EET (UTC+2)	Hološko 42'; Sivok 45'; Şahan 50'	Summary	Mouche 61'	Stadium: BJK İnönü Stadium; Referee: Halis Özkahya

19 January 2013 18	Beşiktaş	2–2	İstanbul BB	Istanbul
19:00 EET (UTC+2)	Sivok 28'; Şahan 57'	Summary	Holmén 22'; Doka Madureira 65'	Stadium: BJK İnönü Stadium; Referee: Serkan Çınar

27 January 2013 19	Galatasaray	2–1	Beşiktaş	Istanbul
19:00 EET (UTC+2)	Çolak 2'; Riera 45'; Melo (red card) 61'	Summary	Sivok 46'	Stadium: Türk Telekom Arena; Referee: Tolga Özkalfa

1 February 2013 20	Beşiktaş	2–2	Karabükspor	Istanbul
20:00 EET (UTC+2)	Toraman 16'; Şahan 58'	Summary	Özgenç (yellow card) 4' (yellow-red card) 60'; Özek 63'; LuaLua 69'	Stadium: BJK İnönü Stadium; Referee: Yunus Yıldırım

9 February 2013 21	Elazığspor	1–3	Beşiktaş	Elazığ
19:00 EET (UTC+2)	Görk 4'	Summary	Hološko 45'; Toraman 56'; Fernandes 82'	Stadium: Elazığ Atatürk Stadium; Referee: İlker Meral

16 February 2013 22	Beşiktaş	1–1	Gaziantepspor	Istanbul
19:00 EET (UTC+2)	Gülüm 21'	Summary	Binya (red card) 53'; Kouemaha 89'	Stadium: BJK İnönü Stadium; Referee: Barış Şimşek

23 February 2013 23	Sivasspor	0–1	Beşiktaş	Sivas
19:00 EET (UTC+2)	Rajnoch (yellow card) 35'; Kavuk (red card) 67'; Piech (yellow card) 90'	Summary	Hilbert (yellow card) 74' (goal) 81'	Stadium: Sivas 4 Eylül Stadium; Referee: Cagatay Sahan

3 March 2013 24	Beşiktaş	3–2	Fenerbahçe	Istanbul
19:00 EET (UTC+2)	Kuyt 40' (o.g.); Niang 60'; Şahan 90'	Summary	Sow 24', 63'	Stadium: BJK İnönü Stadium; Referee: Mete Kalkavan

9 March 2013 25	Trabzonspor	0–0	Beşiktaş	Trabzon
19:00 EET (UTC+2)		Summary		Stadium: Hüseyin Avni Aker Stadium; Referee: Fırat Aydınus

16 March 2013 26	Beşiktaş	1–3	Kasımpaşa	Istanbul
19:00 EET (UTC+2)	Şahan 13'	Summary	Viudez 7'; Djalma 33'; Çolak 78'	Stadium: BJK İnönü Stadium; Referee: Cüneyt Çakır

1 April 2013 27	Mersin İdman Yurdu	1–2	Beşiktaş	Mersin
20:00 EEST (UTC+3)	Nobre 40'	Summary	Fernandes 32'; Nobre 51' (o.g.)	Stadium: Tevfik Sırrı Gür Stadium; Referee: Abdullah Yılmaz

8 April 2013 28	Bursaspor	3–0	Beşiktaş	Bursa
20:00 EEST (UTC+3)	Pinto 15'; Batalla 37'; Kiraz 65'	Summary		Stadium: Bursa Atatürk Stadium; Referee: Halis Özkahya

15 April 2013 29	Beşiktaş	1–0	Antalyaspor	Istanbul
20:00 EEST (UTC+3)	Şahan 57'	Summary		Stadium: BJK İnönü Stadium; Referee: Mete Kalkavan

20 April 2013 30	Akhisar Belediyespor	4–1	Beşiktaş	Akhisar
20:00 EEST (UTC+3)	Gekas 2', 28'; Demirok 74'; Aladağ 81'	Summary	Pektemek 27'	Stadium: Manisa 19 Mayıs Stadium; Referee: Kuddusi Müftüoğlu

27 April 2013 31	Beşiktaş	2–0	Orduspor	Istanbul
20:00 EEST (UTC+3)	Niang 25'; Özyakup 90'	Summary		Stadium: BJK İnönü Stadium; Referee: Fırat Aydınus

5 May 2013 32	Eskişehirspor	1–2	Beşiktaş	Eskişehir
16:00 EEST (UTC+3)	Çek 36'	Summary	Niang 45'; Pektemek 76'	Stadium: Eskişehir Atatürk Stadium; Referee: Mustafa Abitoğlu

11 May 2013 33	Beşiktaş	3–0	Gençlerbirliği	Istanbul
20:00 EEST (UTC+3)	Kavlak 14'; Şahan 45'; Hološko 73'	Summary		Stadium: BJK İnönü Stadium; Referee: Barış Şimşek

19 May 2013 34	Kayserispor	2–0	Beşiktaş	Kayseri
19:00 EEST (UTC+3)	Arıca 70'; Bobô 86'	Summary		Stadium: Kadir Has Stadium; Referee: İlker Meral

==== Table ====
Pos	Team	Pld	W	D	L	GF	GA	GD	Pts	Qualification or relegation
1	Galatasaray (C)	34	21	8	5	66	35	+31	71	Qualification for the Champions League group stage
2	Fenerbahçe	34	18	7	9	56	39	+17	61	Qualification for the Champions League third qualifying round
3	Beşiktaş	34	16	10	8	63	49	+14	58	Qualification for the Europa League play-off round
4	Bursaspor	34	14	13	7	52	41	+11	55	Qualification for the Europa League third qualifying round
5	Kayserispor	34	15	7	12	48	45	+3	52	

Rules for classification: 1) points; 2) goal difference; 3) number of goals scored.
(C) Champions

=== Turkish Cup ===
25 September 2012 Second round	Niğde Belediyespor	1–2	Beşiktaş	Niğde
14:30 EEST (UTC+3)	Hilbert 55' (o.g.)	Summary	Arı 1'; Gülüm 63'	Stadium: Niğde 5 Şubat Stadium; Referee: Ömer Faruk Ocak

31 October 2012 Third round	Beşiktaş	2–1	Ofspor	Istanbul
20:30 EET (UTC+2)	Fernandes 66'; Almeida 73'	Summary	G. Durmus 7'	Stadium: BJK İnönü Stadium

28 November 2012 Fourth round	Beşiktaş	3–2	Ankaragücü	Istanbul
18:30 EET (UTC+2)	Hološko 21'; Hilbert 60' (pen.); Karadeniz 86'	Summary	Özgöz 37'; Kanak 42'	Stadium: BJK İnönü Stadium

12 December 2012 Fifth round	Antalyaspor	2–1	Beşiktaş	Antalya
18:00 EET (UTC+2)	Duruer 20'; Şişmanoğlu 22'	Summary	Hološko 29'	Stadium: Akdeniz University Stadium

== Squad statistics ==
As of 20 May 2013

=== Appearances and goals ===
No.	Pos	Nat	Player	Total		Süper Lig		Turkish Cup	
No.	Pos	Nat	Player	Apps	Goals	Apps	Goals	Apps	Goals
1	GK	(Turkey) TUR	Cenk Gönen	12	0	8+0	0	4+0	0
3	DF	(Turkey) TUR	İsmail Köybaşı	0	0	0+0	0	0+0	0
4	MF	(Portugal) POR	Manuel Fernandes	27	8	25+1	7	0+1	1
5	DF	(Turkey) TUR	İbrahim Toraman	27	3	24+1	3	1+1	0
6	DF	(Czech Republic) CZE	Tomáš Sivok	28	5	26+1	5	1+0	0
7	FW	(Brazil) BRA	Dentinho	6	0	1+5	0	0+0	0
8	MF	(Austria) AUT	Veli Kavlak	33	1	23+7	1	3+0	0
9	FW	(Portugal) POR	Hugo Almeida	22	10	17+3	9	1+1	1
10	MF	(Turkey) TUR	Olcay Şahan	35	11	31+1	11	1+2	0
11	FW	(Turkey) TUR	Mustafa Pektemek	16	2	16+0	2	0+0	0
13	DF	(Germany) GER	Roberto Hilbert	34	3	31+0	2	3+0	1
14	DF	(France) FRA	Julien Escudé	17	0	10+4	0	3+0	0
15	FW	(Turkey) TUR	Oğuzhan Özyakup	30	3	18+10	3	1+1	0
17	FW	(Turkey) TUR	Mehmet Akyüz	7	0	0+5	0	2+0	0
18	MF	(Turkey) TUR	Kadir Arı	3	1	0+1	0	2+0	1
19	DF	(Turkey) TUR	Gökhan Süzen	11	0	10+1	0	0+0	0
20	MF	(Turkey) TUR	Necip Uysal	30	1	20+6	1	3+1	0
21	FW	(Turkey) TUR	Mertcan Aktaş	1	0	0+0	0	0+1	0
22	DF	(Australia) AUS	Ersan Gülüm	23	2	16+3	1	4+0	1
23	GK	(Scotland) SCO	Allan McGregor	25	0	25+0	0	0+0	0
24	DF	(Turkey) TUR	Emre Özkan	11	0	6+2	0	3+0	0
25	MF	(Turkey) TUR	Uğur Boral	20	1	16+2	1	1+1	0
26	FW	(Turkey) TUR	Sinan Kurumuş	2	0	1+1	0	0+0	0
28	MF	(Turkey) TUR	Mehmet Akgün	9	0	5+3	0	1+0	0
30	MF	(Turkey) TUR	Hasan Türk	10	0	1+7	0	2+0	0
34	FW	(Turkey) TUR	Batuhan Karadeniz	15	1	3+8	0	2+2	1
37	FW	(Slovakia) SVK	Filip Hološko	32	12	26+4	10	2+0	2
39	MF	(Turkey) TUR	Erkan Kaş	11	0	1+7	0	3+0	0
53	FW	(Senegal) SEN	Mamadou Niang	9	3	6+3	3	0+0	0
66	DF	(Austria) AUT	Tanju Kayhan	0	0	0+0	0	0+0	0
80	MF	(Turkey) TUR	Muhammed Demirci	5	0	0+4	0	1+0	0
93	DF	(Turkey) TUR	Atınç Nukan	0	0	0+0	0	0+0	0
99	GK	(Turkey) TUR	Emre Metin	0	0	0+0	0	0+0	0
	MF	(Turkey) TUR	Burak Kaplan	0	0	0+0	0	0+0	0
	MF	(Turkey) TUR	Koray Yildiz	0	0	0+0	0	0+0	0
Players away from the club on loan:
Players who appeared for Beşiktaş no longer at the club:
7	MF	(Portugal) POR	Ricardo Quaresma	0	0	0+0	0	0+0	0

=== Top scorers ===
Place	Position	Nation	Number	Name	Süper Lig	Turkish Cup	Total
1	FW	(Slovakia)	37	Filip Hološko	10	2	12
2	MF	(Turkey)	10	Olcay Şahan	11	0	11
3	FW	(Portugal)	9	Hugo Almeida	9	1	10
4	MF	(Portugal)	4	Manuel Fernandes	7	1	8
5	DF	(Czech Republic)	6	Tomáš Sivok	5	0	5
6	DF	(Germany)	13	Roberto Hilbert	2	1	3
6	DF	(Turkey)	5	İbrahim Toraman	3	0	3
6				Own goal	3	0	3
6	FW	(Turkey)	15	Oğuzhan Özyakup	3	0	3
6	FW	(Senegal)	53	Mamadou Niang	3	0	3
11	DF	(Australia)	22	Ersan Gülüm	1	1	2
11	FW	(Turkey)	11	Mustafa Pektemek	2	0	2
13	FW	(Turkey)	25	Uğur Boral	1	0	1
13	MF	(Turkey)	20	Necip Uysal	1	0	1
13	MF	(Austria)	8	Veli Kavlak	1	0	1
13	MF	(Turkey)	18	Kadir Arı	0	1	1
13	FW	(Turkey)	34	Batuhan Karadeniz	0	1	1
				TOTALS	62	8	70

=== Disciplinary record ===
Number	Nation	Position	Name	Süper Lig		Turkish Cup		Total	
Number	Nation	Position	Name	Yellow card	Red card	Yellow card	Red card	Yellow card	Red card
1	(Turkey)	GK	Cenk Gönen	1	0	1	0	2	0
4	(Portugal)	MF	Manuel Fernandes	4	0	1	0	5	0
5	(Turkey)	DF	İbrahim Toraman	9	0	1	0	10	0
6	(Czech Republic)	DF	Tomáš Sivok	6	0	1	0	7	0
8	(Austria)	MF	Veli Kavlak	10	1	1	0	11	1
9	(Portugal)	FW	Hugo Almeida	4	1	1	0	5	1
10	(Turkey)	MF	Olcay Şahan	2	0	0	0	2	0
11	(Turkey)	FW	Mustafa Pektemek	1	0	0	0	1	0
13	(Germany)	DF	Roberto Hilbert	9	0	1	0	10	0
14	(France)	DF	Julien Escudé	1	0	0	0	1	0
15	(Turkey)	FW	Oğuzhan Özyakup	10	1	1	0	11	1
17	(Turkey)	FW	Mehmet Akyüz	1	0	0	0	1	0
19	(Turkey)	DF	Gökhan Süzen	5	1	0	0	5	1
20	(Turkey)	MF	Necip Uysal	5	0	1	0	6	0
22	(Turkey)	DF	Ersan Gülüm	8	0	0	0	8	0
23	(Scotland)	GK	Allan McGregor	2	0	0	0	2	0
24	(Turkey)	DF	Emre Özkan	4	0	2	0	6	0
25	(Turkey)	MF	Uğur Boral	3	0	0	0	3	0
28	(Germany)	DF	Mehmet Akgün	1	0	0	0	1	0
30	(Turkey)	MF	Hasan Türk	0	0	1	0	1	0
34	(Turkey)	FW	Batuhan Karadeniz	1	0	0	0	1	0
37	(Slovakia)	FW	Filip Hološko	3	0	1	0	4	0
39	(Turkey)	MF	Erkan Kaş	2	0	2	0	4	0
53	(Cameroon)	FW	Mamadou Niang	1	0	0	0	1	0
			TOTALS	92	4	15	0	107	4
