= 2013–14 Beşiktaş J.K. season =

Beşiktaş J.K.
2013-14 season
- President: Fikret Orman
- Head coach: Slaven Bilić
- Stadium: Recep Tayyip Erdoğan Stadium; Atatürk Olympic Stadium (derbies only)
- Süper Lig: 3rd
- Turkish Cup: Fourth round (vs. Bucaspor)
- UEFA Europa League: Play-off round (vs. Tromsø)
- Top goalscorer: League: Hugo Almeida (13); All: Hugo Almeida (15)
Home colours	Away colours	Third colours

The 2013–14 season was Beşiktaş' 56th consecutive year in the Süper Lig, and their 110th season. They finished the season in third place in the Süper Lig, were knocked out of the Turkish Cup by Bucaspor at the fourth round stage and they defeated Tromsø in the play-off round of the UEFA Europa League before they were disqualified from the competition.

== Squad ==
Players and squad numbers last updated on 18 August 2013. Note: Flags indicate national team as has been defined under FIFA eligibility rules. Players may hold more than one non-FIFA nationality.

No.	Name	Nationality	Position	Date of Birth (Age)	Signed from	Signed in
Goalkeepers
1	Cenk Gönen	(Turkey)	GK	21 February 1988 (age 38)	Denizlispor	2010
23	Günay Güvenç	(Turkey)	GK	25 July 1991 (age 35)	(Germany) Stuttgarter Kickers	2013
29	Tolga Zengin	(Turkey)	GK	10 October 1983 (age 43)	Trabzonspor	2013
99	Emre Metin	(Turkey)	GK	7 February 1993 (age 33)	Youth system	2012
Defenders
3	İsmail Köybaşı	(Turkey)	LB	10 July 1989 (age 37)	Gaziantepspor	2009
6	Tomáš Sivok (VC)	(Czech Republic)	CB	15 September 1983 (age 43)	(Italy) Udinese	2008
14	Julien Escudé	(France)	CB	17 August 1979 (age 47)	(Spain) Sevilla	2012
18	İbrahim Toraman (C)	(Turkey)	CB	19 November 1981 (age 44)	Gaziantepspor	2004
19	Pedro Franco	(Colombia)	CB	23 April 1991 (age 35)	(Colombia) Millonarios	2013
22	Ersan Gülüm	(Turkey)	CB	17 May 1987 (age 39)	Adanaspor	2011
24	Dany Nounkeu	(Cameroon)	CB	11 April 1986 (age 40)	Galatasaray	2014
26	Gökhan Süzen	(Turkey)	LB	12 July 1987 (age 39)	İstanbul B.B.	2013
27	Serdar Kurtuluş	(Turkey)	RB	23 July 1987 (age 39)	Gaziantepspor	2013
31	Ramon	(Brazil)	LB	6 May 1988 (age 38)	(Brazil) Corinthians	2013
Midfielders
4	Manuel Fernandes	(Portugal)	CM	5 February 1986 (age 40)	(Spain) Valencia	2011
5	Sezer Öztürk	(Turkey)	AM	3 November 1985 (age 41)	Fenerbahçe	2013
8	Veli Kavlak	(Austria)	DM	3 November 1988 (age 38)	(Austria) Rapid Wien	2011
10	Olcay Şahan	(Turkey)	LW	26 May 1987 (age 39)	(Germany) 1. FC Kaiserslautern	2012
13	Atiba Hutchinson	(Canada)	DM	8 February 1983 (age 43)	(Netherlands) PSV	2013
15	Oğuzhan Özyakup	(Turkey)	CM	23 September 1992 (age 34)	(England) Arsenal	2012
17	Gökhan Töre	(Turkey)	RW	20 January 1992 (age 34)	(Russia) Rubin Kazan	2013
20	Necip Uysal (VC)	(Turkey)	CM	24 January 1991 (age 35)	Youth system	2008
21	Kerim Frei	(Turkey)	LW	19 November 1993 (age 32)	(England) Fulham	2013
25	Uğur Boral	(Turkey)	LM	14 April 1982 (age 44)	Samsunspor	2012
33	Jermaine Jones	(United States)	DM	3 November 1982 (age 44)	(Germany) Schalke 04	2014
Forwards
9	Hugo Almeida	(Portugal)	ST	23 May 1984 (age 42)	(Germany) Werder Bremen	2011
11	Mustafa Pektemek	(Turkey)	CF	11 August 1988 (age 38)	Gençlerbirliği	2011
37	Filip Hološko	(Slovakia)	RW	17 January 1984 (age 42)	Manisaspor	2008
77	Ömer Şişmanoğlu	(Turkey)	CF	8 January 1989 (age 37)	Antalyaspor	2013

=== Out on loan ===
Note: Flags indicate national team as defined under FIFA eligibility rules; some limited exceptions apply. Players may hold more than one non-FIFA nationality.

No.	Pos.	Nation	Player
2	DF	AUT	Tanju Kayhan (on loan at Elazığspor)
26	FW	TUR	Sinan Kurumuş (on loan at Boluspor)
30	FW	NGR	Michael Eneramo (on loan at Kardemir Karabükspor)
39	MF	TUR	Erkan Kaş (on loan at Kardemir Karabükspor)

No.	Pos.	Nation	Player
49	MF	TUR	Muhammed Demirci (on loan at Gaziantep B.B.)
93	DF	TUR	Mehmet Akyüz (on loan at Dardanel S.A.Ş.)
—	MF	TUR	Hasan Türk (on loan at Göztepe)
—	FW	BRA	Marcio Nobre (on loan at Kayserispor)

== Transfers ==
=== Summer ===
In: Note: Flags indicate national team as defined under FIFA eligibility rules; some limited exceptions apply. Players may hold more than one non-FIFA nationality.

No.	Pos.	Nation	Player
4	DF	COL	Pedro Franco (from (Colombia) Millonarios)
5	MF	TUR	Sezer Öztürk (from (Turkey) Fenerbahçe)
13	MF	CAN	Atiba Hutchinson (from (Netherlands) PSV)
17	MF	TUR	Gökhan Töre (loan rom (Russia) Rubin Kazan)
21	MF	TUR	Kerim Frei (from (England) Fulham)
23	GK	TUR	Günay Güvenç (from (Germany) Stuttgarter Kickers)
27	DF	TUR	Serdar Kurtuluş (from (Turkey) Gaziantepspor)
29	GK	TUR	Tolga Zengin (from (Turkey) Trabzonspor)
30	FW	NGR	Michael Eneramo (from (Turkey) Sivasspor)
31	DF	TUR	Ramon Motta (loan from (Brazil) Corinthians)
77	GK	TUR	Ömer Şişmanoğlu (from (Turkey) Antalyaspor)

Out: Note: Flags indicate national team as defined under FIFA eligibility rules; some limited exceptions apply. Players may hold more than one non-FIFA nationality.

No.	Pos.	Nation	Player
2	DF	AUT	Tanju Kayhan (to (Turkey) Elazığspor)
13	DF	GER	Roberto Hilbert (to (Germany) Bayer Leverkusen)
17	FW	TUR	Mehmet Akyüz (to (Turkey) Akhisar Belediyespor)
23	GK	SCO	Allan McGregor (to (England) Hull City)
24	DF	TUR	Emre Özkan (to (Turkey) Kardemir Karabükspor)
26	FW	TUR	Sinan Kurumuş (loan to (Turkey) Boluspor)
30	MF	TUR	Hasan Türk (loan to (Turkey) Göztepe)
39	MF	TUR	Erkan Kaş (loan to (Turkey) Kardemir Karabükspor)
53	FW	SEN	Mamadou Niang (loan return to (Qatar) Al Sadd)
93	DF	TUR	Mehmet Akyüz (loan to (Turkey) Dardanel S.A.Ş.)

=== Winter ===
In: Note: Flags indicate national team as defined under FIFA eligibility rules; some limited exceptions apply. Players may hold more than one non-FIFA nationality.

No.	Pos.	Nation	Player
24	DF	CMR	Dany Nounkeu (loan from (Turkey) Galatasaray)
33	MF	USA	Jermaine Jones (from (Germany) Schalke 04)

Out: Note: Flags indicate national team as defined under FIFA eligibility rules; some limited exceptions apply. Players may hold more than one non-FIFA nationality.

No.	Pos.	Nation	Player
2	DF	AUT	Tanju Kayhan (loan to (Turkey) Elazığspor)
7	FW	BRA	Dentinho (loan return to (Ukraine) Shakhtar Donetsk)
28	MF	TUR	Mehmet Akgün (loan to (Turkey) Kayseri Erciyesspor)
30	FW	NGR	Michael Eneramo (loan to (Turkey) Kardemir Karabükspor)
49	MF	TUR	Muhammed Demirci (loan to (Turkey) Gaziantep B.B.)

== Competitions ==
=== Süper Lig ===
==== Results ====
18 August 2013 1	Beşiktaş	2–0	Trabzonspor	Istanbul
21:45 EEST (UTC+3)	Şahan 75'; Töre 82'	Summary		Stadium: Atatürk Olympic Stadium; Referee: Halis Özkahya

26 August 2013 2	Kayseri Erciyesspor	2–4	Beşiktaş	Kayseri
21:45 EEST (UTC+3)	Vleminckx 11' (pen.); Öztekin 41'; Azofeifa (yellow card) 34' (yellow-red card) 90+2'	Summary	Fernandes 23'; Töre 51'; Escudé 65'; Almeida 88'	Stadium: Kadir Has Stadium; Referee: Serkan Çınar

1 September 2013 3	Beşiktaş	2–0	Gaziantepspor	Istanbul
19:30 EEST (UTC+3)	Almeida 29', 36' (pen.)	Summary		Stadium: Atatürk Olympic Stadium; Referee: Ali Palabıyık

15 September 2013 4	Bursaspor	0–3	Beşiktaş	Bursa
20:30 EEST (UTC+3)		Summary	Almeida 14'; Sivok 37'; Escudé 64'	Stadium: Bursa Atatürk Stadium; Referee: Bülent Yıldırım

22 September 2013 5	Beşiktaş	0–3	Galatasaray	Istanbul
19:00 EEST (UTC+3)		Summary	Drogba 59', 72'; Melo (red card) 90'	Stadium: Atatürk Olympic Stadium; Attendance: 76,127; Referee: Fırat Aydınus

30 September 2013 6	Antalyaspor	2–0	Beşiktaş	Antalya
20:00 EEST (UTC+3)	Diarra 47', 52'	Summary		Stadium: Akdeniz University Stadium; Referee: İlker Meral

5 October 2013 7	Eskişehirspor	0–1	Beşiktaş	Eskişehir
19:00 EEST (UTC+3)		Summary	Şişmanoğlu 70'	Stadium: Eskişehir Atatürk Stadium; Referee: Tolga Özkalfa

21 October 2013 8	Beşiktaş	0–0	Çaykur Rizespor	Istanbul
20:00 EEST (UTC+3)		Summary		Stadium: Atatürk Olympic Stadium; Referee: Yunus Yıldırım

26 October 2013 9	Akhisar Belediyespor	3–3	Beşiktaş	Manisa
19:00 EEST (UTC+3)	Mezenga 24', 35'; Kısa 37'	Summary	Şahan 18'; Özyakup 40'; Almeida 54'	Stadium: Manisa 19 Mayıs Stadium; Referee: Mustafa Abitoğlu

3 November 2013 10	Beşiktaş	0–0	Kardemir Karabükspor	Istanbul
19:00 EET (UTC+2)		Summary		Stadium: Recep Tayyip Erdoğan Stadium; Referee: Barış Şimşek

9 November 2013 11	Kayserispor	0–3	Beşiktaş	Kayseri
19:00 EET (UTC+2)		Summary	Şahan 21'; Değirmenci 82' (o.g.); Ramon (yellow card) 45+1' (yellow-red card) 84'; Eneramo 90+2'	Stadium: Kadir Has Stadium; Referee: Mustafa Coşkun

25 November 2013 12	Beşiktaş	3–1	Torku Konyaspor	Istanbul
20:00 EET (UTC+2)	Şahan 26'; Almeida 31'; Özyakup 41'	Summary	Ay 49'	Stadium: Recep Tayyip Erdoğan Stadium; Referee: Özgur Yankaya

30 November 2013 13	Fenerbahçe	3–3	Beşiktaş	Istanbul
20:00 EET (UTC+2)	Emenike 12'; Meireles (red card) 30'; Sow 37'; Kuyt 83'	Summary	Şahan 9'; Almeida 43', 45+1'; Uysal (yellow card) 54' (yellow-red card) 69'	Stadium: Şükrü Saracoğlu Stadium; Referee: Cüneyt Çakır

9 December 2013 14	Beşiktaş	1–1	Sivasspor	Istanbul
20:00 EET (UTC+2)	Almeida 5'	Summary	Da Costa 71'	Stadium: Recep Tayyip Erdoğan Stadium; Referee: Mustafa Abitoğlu

21 December 2013 15	Beşiktaş	4–1	Elazığspor	Istanbul
19:00 EET (UTC+2)	Sivok 22'; Hološko 46', 81'; Şahan 70'	Summary	Yılmaz 29'	Stadium: Recep Tayyip Erdoğan Stadium; Referee: Mete Kalkavan

27 December 2013 16	Gençlerbirliği	1–0	Beşiktaş	Ankara
20:00 EET (UTC+2)	Zec 21'	Summary		Stadium: Ankara 19 Mayıs Stadium; Referee: Özgür Yankaya

25 January 2014 17	Trabzonspor	1–1	Beşiktaş	Trabzon
19:00 EET (UTC+2)	Güral 15'	Summary	Almeida 85'	Stadium: Hüseyin Avni Aker Stadium; Referee: Yunus Yıldırım

31 January 2014 18	Beşiktaş	3–2	Kayseri Erciyesspor	Istanbul
20:00 EET (UTC+2)	Fernandes 43'; Töre 53'; Özyakup 57'	Summary	Mangane 68'; Vleminckx 89'	Stadium: Atatürk Olympic Stadium; Referee: Cüneyt Çakır

7 February 2014 19	Gaziantepspor	1–2	Beşiktaş	Gaziantep
20:00 EET (UTC+2)	Sapara 85'	Summary	Şahan 19'; Şişmanoğlu 74'	Stadium: Gaziantep Kamil Ocak Stadium; Referee: Mustafa Abitoğlu

11 February 2014 20	Kasımpaşa	0–3	Beşiktaş	Istanbul
20:00 EET (UTC+2)		Summary	Almeida 26'; Franco 34'; Kavlak 44'; Kurtuluş (yellow card) 35' (yellow-red card) 49'	Stadium: Recep Tayyip Erdoğan Stadium; Referee: Tolga Özkalfa

16 February 2014 21	Beşiktaş	1–0	Bursaspor	Istanbul
14:00 EET (UTC+2)	Gülüm (red card) 44'; Almeida 72'	Summary		Stadium: Atatürk Olympic Stadium; Referee: İlker Meral

22 February 2014 22	Galatasaray	1–0	Beşiktaş	Istanbul
19:00 EET (UTC+2)	İnan 38' (pen.)	Summary		Stadium: Türk Telekom Arena; Referee: Cüneyt Çakır

28 February 2014 23	Beşiktaş	0–0	Antalyaspor	Istanbul
20:00 EET (UTC+2)		Summary		Stadium: Atatürk Olympic Stadium; Referee: Çağatay Şahan

9 March 2014 24	Beşiktaş	1–0	Eskişehirspor	Istanbul
19:00 EET (UTC+2)	Gülüm 89'	Summary		Stadium: Atatürk Olympic Stadium; Referee: Mustafa Abitoğlu

15 March 2014 25	Çaykur Rizespor	2–2	Beşiktaş	Rize
19:00 EET (UTC+2)	Kweuke 13' (pen.); Kadhim 28' (pen.)	Summary	Pektemek 6', 50'	Stadium: Yeni Rize Şehir Stadı; Referee: Ali Palabıyık

23 March 2014 26	Beşiktaş	3–0	Akhisar Belediyespor	Istanbul
19:00 EET (UTC+2)	Kavlak 2'; Pektemek 8'; Hutchinson 69'	Summary		Stadium: Atatürk Olympic Stadium; Referee: Bülent Yıldırım

28 March 2014 27	Kardemir Karabükspor	1–0	Beşiktaş	Karabük
20:00 EET (UTC+2)	Eneramo 90'	Summary		Stadium: Dr. Necmettin Şeyhoğlu Stadium; Referee: Tolga Özkalfa

5 April 2014 28	Beşiktaş	2–1	Kayserispor	Istanbul
19:00 EEST (UTC+3)	Şahan 43'; Özyakup 68'	Summary	Yokuşlu 90+2'	Stadium: Atatürk Olympic Stadium; Referee: Cüneyt Çakır

11 April 2014 29	Torku Konyaspor	1–1	Beşiktaş	Konya
20:00 EEST (UTC+3)	Gekas 90+3'	Summary	Özyakup 69'	Stadium: Konya Atatürk Stadium; Referee: Çağatay Şahan

20 April 2014 30	Beşiktaş	1–1	Fenerbahçe	Istanbul
19:00 EEST (UTC+3)	Ramon 44', (yellow card) 30' (yellow-red card) 58'; Köybaşı (yellow card) 79' (yellow-red card) 90'	Summary	Sow 24'	Stadium: Atatürk Olympic Stadium; Referee: Halis Özkahya

27 April 2014 31	Sivasspor	3–0	Beşiktaş	Sivas
19:00 EEST (UTC+3)	Utaka 56'; Zengin 70' (o.g.); Chahechouhe 82'	Summary		Stadium: Sivas 4 Eylül Stadium; Referee: Mete Kalkavan

3 May 2014 32	Beşiktaş	2–1	Kasımpaşa	Istanbul
19:00 EEST (UTC+3)	Özyakup 7'; Kavlak 17'	Summary	Scarione 90'	Stadium: Atatürk Olympic Stadium; Referee: Mustafa Abitoğlu

11 May 2014 33	Elazığspor	0–1	Beşiktaş	Elazığ
19:00 EEST (UTC+3)	Kaş (red card) 81'	Summary	Töre 39'	Stadium: Elazığ Atatürk Stadium; Referee: Tolga Özkalfa

17 May 2014 34	Beşiktaş	1–1	Gençlerbirliği	Istanbul
19:00 EEST (UTC+3)	Almeida 35'; Özyakup (red card) 90+3'	Summary	Çelik 58'	Stadium: Atatürk Olympic Stadium; Referee: İlker Meral

==== League table ====
Pos	Team	Pld	W	D	L	GF	GA	GD	Pts	Qualification or relegation
1	Fenerbahçe (C)	34	23	5	6	74	33	+41	74	(Note: Although Fenerbahçe would have qualified for the Champions League group stage as champions, they were barred from participating in next season's European competitions due to UEFA sanctioning because of the 2011 Turkish football match-fixing scandal, with this season also counting for that ban. As a result, the runners-up of the league (Galatasaray) entered the Champions League group stage instead of the third qualifying round, the third-placed team of the league (Beşiktaş) entered the Champions League third qualifying round instead of the Europa League play-off round, and the fourth-placed team of the league (Trabzonspor) entered the Europa League play-off round instead of the third qualifying round.)
2	Galatasaray	34	18	11	5	59	32	+27	65	Qualification for the Champions League group stage
3	Beşiktaş	34	17	11	6	53	33	+20	62	Qualification for the Champions League third qualifying round
4	Trabzonspor	34	14	11	9	53	41	+12	53 (Note: Trabzonspor finished ahead of Sivasspor on head-to-head record: Trabzonspor–Sivasspor 0–0, Sivasspor–Trabzonspor 0–4.)	Qualification for the Europa League play-off round
5	Sivasspor	34	16	5	13	60	55	+5	53	(Note: Sivasspor were banned from European competitions by UEFA due to match-fixing. As a result, their Europa League spot was passed down the league to the next eligible team (Karabükspor).)

Source: tff.org
Rules for classification: 1) points; 2) goal difference; 3) number of goals scored.
(C) Champions

=== Turkish Cup ===
5 December 2013 Fourth round	Bucaspor	2–1	Beşiktaş	İzmir
20:30 EET (UTC+2)	Gündoğan 41'; Ricketts 78'	Summary	Şişmanoğlu 65'	Stadium: İzmir Atatürk Stadium; Referee: Suat Arslanboğa

=== UEFA Europa League ===
==== Qualifying rounds ====
22 August 2013 Play-off round 1st leg	Tromsø (Norway)	2–1	(Turkey) Beşiktaş	Tromsø, Norway
21:00 EEST (UTC+3)	Bediksen 49' (pen.); Pritchard 68'	Report	Almeida 9'	Stadium: Alfheim Stadion; Attendance: 4,528; Referee: Alan Kelly (Ireland)

29 August 2013 Play-off round 2nd leg	Beşiktaş (Turkey)	2–0 (3–2 agg.)	(Norway) Tromsø	Istanbul, Turkey
20:30 EEST (UTC+3)	Almeida 52'; Özyakup 54'	Report		Stadium: Atatürk Olympic Stadium; Attendance: 44,578; Referee: Marcin Borski (Poland)

== Squad statistics ==
=== Appearances and goals ===
No.	Pos	Nat	Player	Total		Süper Lig		Turkish Cup		UEFA Europa League	
No.	Pos	Nat	Player	Apps	Goals	Apps	Goals	Apps	Goals	Apps	Goals
1	GK	(Turkey) TUR	Cenk Gönen	3	0	0+2	0	1	0	0	0
3	DF	(Turkey) TUR	İsmail Köybaşı	8	0	3+4	0	1	0	0	0
4	MF	(Portugal) POR	Manuel Fernandes	21	2	16+3	2	0	0	2	0
6	DF	(Czech Republic) CZE	Tomáš Sivok	15	2	13	2	0	0	2	0
8	MF	(Austria) AUT	Veli Kavlak	31	3	29	3	0	0	2	0
9	FW	(Portugal) POR	Hugo Almeida	33	15	27+4	13	0	0	2	2
10	MF	(Turkey) TUR	Olcay Şahan	36	8	34	8	0	0	2	0
11	FW	(Turkey) TUR	Mustafa Pektemek	22	3	6+16	3	0	0	0	0
13	MF	(Canada) CAN	Atiba Hutchinson	33	1	29+1	1	1	0	2	0
14	DF	(France) FRA	Julien Escudé	14	2	10+1	2	1	0	2	0
15	MF	(Turkey) TUR	Oğuzhan Özyakup	29	7	23+3	6	1	0	0+2	1
17	MF	(Turkey) TUR	Gökhan Töre	33	4	26+4	4	0+1	0	1+1	0
18	DF	(Turkey) TUR	İbrahim Toraman	1	0	0+1	0	0	0	0	0
19	DF	(Colombia) COL	Pedro Franco	19	1	17+1	1	1	0	0	0
20	MF	(Turkey) TUR	Necip Uysal	23	0	14+9	0	0	0	0	0
21	MF	(Turkey) TUR	Kerim Frei	10	0	1+8	0	1	0	0	0
22	DF	(Turkey) TUR	Ersan Gülüm	21	1	18+1	1	0	0	2	0
24	DF	(Cameroon) CMR	Dany Nounkeu	9	0	9	0	0	0	0	0
25	MF	(Turkey) TUR	Uğur Boral	7	0	3+4	0	0	0	0	0
27	DF	(Turkey) TUR	Serdar Kurtuluş	25	0	21+1	0	1	0	2	0
29	GK	(Turkey) TUR	Tolga Zengin	36	0	34	0	0	0	2	0
31	DF	(Brazil) BRA	Ramon	27	1	25+1	1	0+1	0	0	0
33	MF	(United States) USA	Jermaine Jones	10	0	8+2	0	0	0	0	0
37	FW	(Slovakia) SVK	Filip Hološko	13	2	4+8	2	1	0	0	0
77	FW	(Turkey) TUR	Ömer Şişmanoğlu	11	3	1+9	2	0+1	1	0	0
Players away from the club on loan :
30	FW	(Nigeria) NGR	Michael Eneramo	7	1	1+3	1	1	0	0+2	0
49	MF	(Turkey) TUR	Muhammed Demirci	11	0	0+9	0	1	0	0+1	0
Players who appeared for Beşiktaş no longer at the club:
7	FW	(Brazil) BRA	Dentinho	3	0	1+1	0	0	0	1	0
28	MF	(Turkey) TUR	Mehmet Akgün	2	0	1+1	0	0	0	0	0

=== Goal scorers ===
Place	Position	Nation	Number	Name	Süper Lig	Turkish Cup	UEFA Europa League	Total
1	FW	(Portugal)	9	Hugo Almeida	13	0	2	15
2	MF	(Turkey)	10	Olcay Şahan	8	0	0	8
3	MF	(Turkey)	15	Oğuzhan Özyakup	6	0	0	6
4	MF	(Turkey)	17	Gökhan Töre	4	0	0	4
5	MF	(Austria)	8	Veli Kavlak	3	0	0	3
5	FW	(Turkey)	11	Mustafa Pektemek	3	0	0	3
5	FW	(Turkey)	77	Ömer Şişmanoğlu	2	1	0	3
8	MF	(Portugal)	4	Manuel Fernandes	2	0	0	2
8	DF	(France)	14	Julien Escudé	2	0	0	2
8	DF	(Czech Republic)	6	Tomáš Sivok	2	0	0	2
8	FW	(Slovakia)	37	Filip Hološko	2	0	0	2
12	FW	(Nigeria)	30	Michael Eneramo	1	0	0	1
12	DF	(Colombia)	19	Pedro Franco	1	0	0	1
12	DF	(Turkey)	22	Ersan Gülüm	1	0	0	1
12	MF	(Canada)	13	Atiba Hutchinson	1	0	0	1
12	DF	(Brazil)	31	Ramon	1	0	0	1
12				Own goal	1	0	0	1
				TOTALS	53	1	3	57

=== Disciplinary record ===
Number	Nation	Position	Name	Süper Lig		Turkish Cup		UEFA Europa League		Total	
Number	Nation	Position	Name	Yellow card	Red card	Yellow card	Red card	Yellow card	Red card	Yellow card	Red card
1	(Turkey)	GK	Cenk Gönen	1	0	0	0	0	0	1	0
3	(Turkey)	DF	İsmail Köybaşı	3	1	0	0	0	0	3	1
4	(Portugal)	MF	Manuel Fernandes	3	0	0	0	0	0	3	0
6	(Czech Republic)	DF	Tomáš Sivok	2	0	0	0	1	0	3	0
8	(Austria)	MF	Veli Kavlak	9	0	0	0	0	0	9	0
9	(Portugal)	FW	Hugo Almeida	1	0	0	0	1	0	2	0
10	(Turkey)	MF	Olcay Şahan	3	0	0	0	1	0	4	0
11	(Turkey)	FW	Mustafa Pektemek	4	0	0	0	0	0	4	0
13	(Canada)	MF	Atiba Hutchinson	4	0	0	0	0	0	4	0
14	(France)	DF	Julien Escudé	2	0	0	0	1	0	3	0
15	(Turkey)	MF	Oğuzhan Özyakup	6	1	1	0	0	0	7	1
17	(Turkey)	MF	Gökhan Töre	3	0	0	0	0	0	3	0
19	(Colombia)	DF	Pedro Franco	3	0	0	0	0	0	3	0
20	(Turkey)	MF	Necip Uysal	7	1	0	0	0	0	7	1
22	(Turkey)	DF	Ersan Gülüm	6	1	0	0	1	0	7	1
24	(Cameroon)	DF	Dany Nounkeu	3	0	0	0	0	0	3	0
25	(Turkey)	MF	Uğur Boral	2	0	0	0	0	0	2	0
27	(Turkey)	DF	Serdar Kurtuluş	4	1	0	0	0	0	4	1
29	(Turkey)	GK	Tolga Zengin	2	0	0	0	0	0	2	0
31	(Brazil)	DF	Ramon	7	2	0	0	0	0	7	2
33	(United States)	MF	Jermaine Jones	5	0	0	0	0	0	5	0
77	(Turkey)	FW	Ömer Şişmanoğlu	1	0	0	0	0	0	1	0
			TOTALS	81	7	1	0	5	0	87	7

== Notes ==
On 30 August 2013, Beşiktaş was disqualified from the 2013–14 UEFA Europa League as per final ruling by the Court of Arbitration for Sport. They were replaced in the group stage draw by Tromsø, which lost to Beşiktaş in the play-off round.
