= Sahan =

Sahan may refer to:

== People ==
- Sahan Palihakkara, Sri Lankan cricketer
- Sahan Wijesiri, Sri Lankan cricketer

== See also ==
- Şahan, Armenian name
- Sahan Kalan, village in Tehsil Kharian, in the Gujrat District of Punjab, Pakistan
- Sahan Research, a think-tank focused on the Horn of Africa and co-founded by Matthew Bryden
