= Palihakkara =

Palihakkara may refer to

- Shesha Palihakkara, Sri Lankan dancer and actor.
- Sahan Palihakkara, Sri Lankan cricketer.
- H. M. G. S. Palihakkara, Sri Lankan diplomat and civil servant.
