= Oğuzhan Özyakup =

Dutch-Turkish footballer (born 1992)

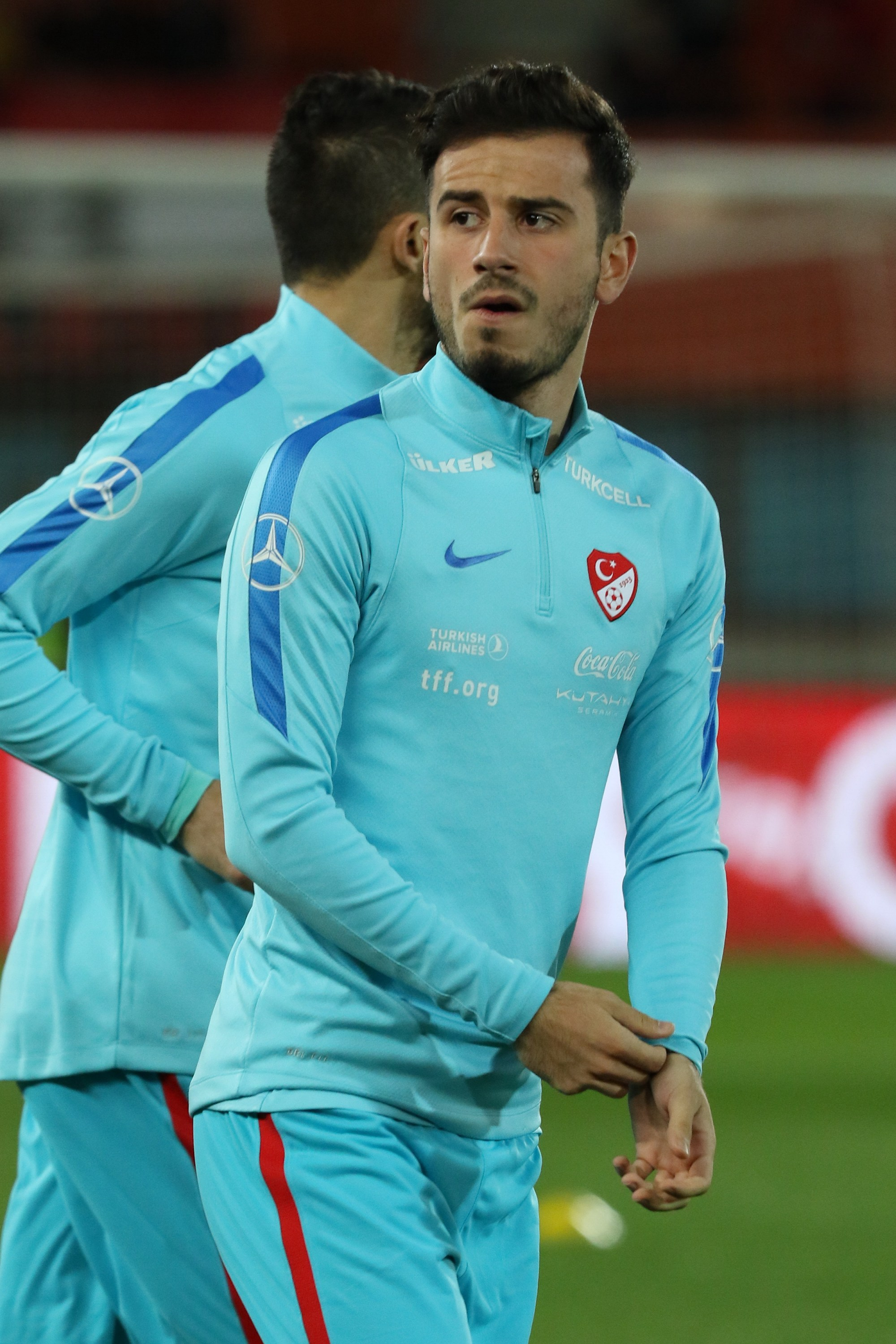
- Özyakup with Turkey in 2016

Personal information
- Full name: Oğuzhan Özyakup
- Date of birth: 23 September 1992 (age 34)
- Place of birth: Zaandam, Netherlands
- Height: 1.80 m (5 ft 11 in)
- Position: Midfielder

Youth career
- Zaandam Türkspor
- 2005–2008: AZ
- 2008–2012: Arsenal

Senior career*
Years	Team	Apps	(Gls)
2011–2012	Arsenal	0	(0)
2012–2022	Beşiktaş	226	(29)
2020	→ Feyenoord (loan)	2	(1)
2022–2024	Fortuna Sittard	44	(4)
Total		272	(34)

International career
2008–2009	Netherlands U17	15	(5)
2011–2012	Netherlands U19	9	(2)
2012–2014	Turkey U21	7	(3)
2013–2019	Turkey	43	(1)
Medal record
Men's football
Representing Netherlands
UEFA European Under-17 Championship
Runner-up	2009
- * Club domestic league appearances and goals

Oğuzhan Özyakup (born 23 September 1992), also known as Ozzie or Ozzy, is a Dutch-Turkish former professional footballer who played as a midfielder.

Born in Zaandam, the Netherlands, Özyakup has previously featured for clubs AZ and Arsenal. While at Arsenal, he won the 2008–09 and 2009–10 Premier Academy League, as well as the 2008–09 FA Youth Cup. At the professional level, Özyakup has won the 2015–16 and 2016–17 Süper Lig with Beşiktaş.

Özyakup represented Netherlands at U-17 which he also captained and, U-19 levels until he switched to represent Turkey in 2012. He represented Turkey 7 times at U-21 level, scoring twice. Earned his first senior international cap in 2013, Özyakup was a Turkish international, being a part of Euro 2016 squad, representing the nation 42 times and scoring once. At the age of 31, he announced his retirement.

== Club career ==
=== Early years ===
Özyakup was born in Zaandam, Netherlands, to Turkish parents from the city of Trabzon who emigrated to the Netherlands. His father is into the wholesale nourishment business. Oğuzhan is the youngest of two siblings.

Özyakup began his career at Zaandam Türkspor, a local amateur club which Dutch players with Turkish descent were predominantly recruited, where he later caught the attraction of AZ officials. He was invited to trials of AZ at age 11, in which he succeeded and was recruited.

=== Arsenal ===
Özyakup signed for Arsenal on schoolboy forms on 1 September 2008, going on to play regularly for Arsenal's Academy. With the academy, Özyakup won the Premier Academy League of 2008–09 and 2009–10. He also was triumphant in lifting the FA Youth Cup of 2008–09 with the Gunners.

On 28 August 2011, Özyakup was named a substitute for the Premier League match against Manchester United in which the London-based club suffered a heavy 8–2 defeat. He made his competitive first-team debut in September 2011 in a League Cup match against Shrewsbury Town, where he supplied the assist for Yossi Benayoun to round off the match 3–1.

Özyakup was an unused substitute in the UEFA Champions League round of 16 tie to Milan, which Arsenal won 3–0 on the night but lost 4–3 on aggregate.

=== Beşiktaş ===
==== 2012–2015 ====
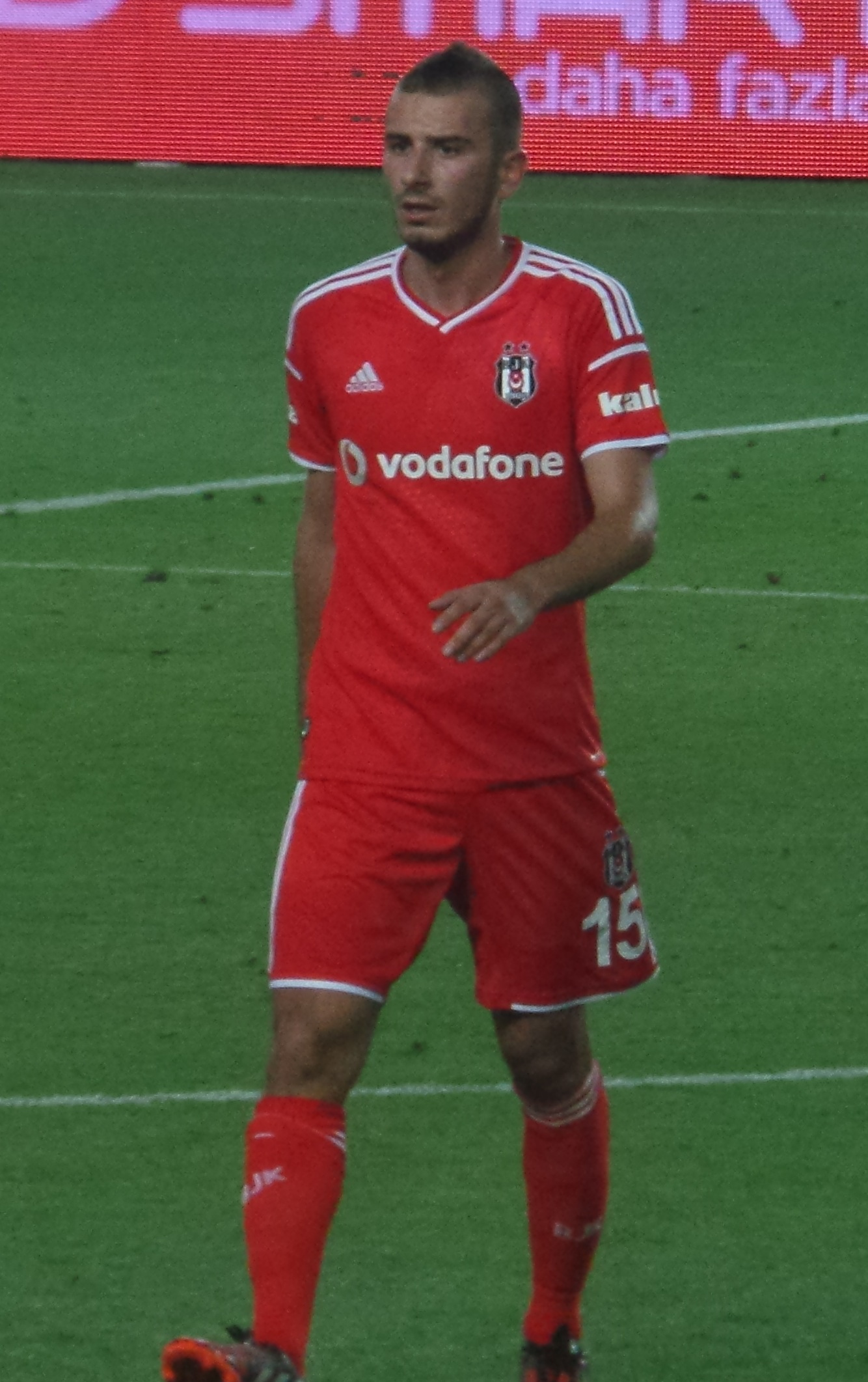
Özyakup at friendly game against Chelsea in Şükrü Saracoğlu Stadium, Istanbul, in 2014 August

Beşiktaş J.K. completed the signing of Özyakup from Arsenal, on 8 June 2012 for a €500,000 transfer fee with a reported 4 season of length and €400,000 wage per annum until the end of 2015–16 season. On 19 August 2012, He made his Süper Lig debut on matchday 1 of 2012–13 season, up against İstanbul Büyükşehir Belediyespor, ended 1–1. He completed 2012–13 season with 2 goals and 7 assists in 18 games at Süper Lig and 1 assists in 2 games at Turkish Cup.

On 29 August 2013, he scored his first goal at European competitions at 2nd leg of play-off round of 2013–14 UEFA Europa League encounter up against Norwegian outfit Tromsø IL, ended 2–0 for favour of Beşiktaş. He picked up a calf injury in 2013 February and was unable to play between matchdays 5 and 8. He recovered from his injury, returned onto field on match day 9 encounter against Akhisarspor at Manisa 19 Mayıs Stadium, ended 3–3 in which he scored the 2nd goal of Beşiktaş.

On 5 June 2014, Özyakup's contract was reportedly renewed with an increased progressive wage increase up to €1.1 million until end of 2018–19 season, along with his teammate Olcay Şahan.

==== 2015–16 season ====
He opened the 2015–16 season with three assists against Mersin İdman Yurdu in week 1, ended 5–2, serviced respectively to Cenk Tosun and Olcay Şahan. In week 3, he scored the opener of the away game directly from a set-piece against Gaziantepspor, which ended 4–0 in favour of Beşiktaş. He assisted the second strike of German international Mario Gómez against Eskişehirspor in week 7 game played away, ended 2–1. He produced another assist to Olcay Şahan in week 9 game played away against Antalyaspor, ended 5–1 for Beşiktaş. Özyakup earned and converted a penalty kick to secure 1 points for Beşiktaş on dying minutes of week 10 game while Kasımpaşaspor were being trailed by Beşiktaş with 3–2. He scored the winner of week 11 game against Bursaspor by assist of Atiba Hutchinson, ended 1–0. He scored with a mid-range shot outside the box in additional time of week 12 game against Sivasspor, ended 2–0. In week 17, he scored the opened the score with a serial of comfortable dribbling over 2 defenders and goalkeeper, following the assist of Mario Gómez, against Konyaspor, ended 4–0. On 22 October 2015, Özyakup assisted Mario Gómez on UEFA Europa League group stage week 3 game against FC Lokomotiv Moscow, ended 1–1.

He scored his first goal of the second half of Süper Lig on week 20's home game against Gaziantepspor, ended 4–0, with assist of Gökhan Töre. He represented the captaincy of Beşiktaş for the first time, as a part of starting line-up at Turkish Cup quarter finals encounter away against Konyaspor, ended 1–0 for home side, on 3 March 2016. He assisted Kerim Frei in week 25 game against Çaykur Rizespor, ended 2–1 for Beşiktaş. In week 26, he scored sole goal of the game against Antalyaspor, ended 1–0. He assisted the goal of Argentine play-maker José Sosa at game of week 27 in which Beşiktaş were defeated by Kasımpaşaspor 2–1, on 4 April 2016. He scored the first goal -scored by a Turkish player- at Vodafone Park at Süper Lig encounter against Kayserispor on 30 April 2016, ended 4–0. He converted a penalty kick against Sivasspor in week 29 away game, ended 2–1 for Beşiktaş.

In May 2016, Beşiktaş chairman Fikret Orman stated that Italian side Lazio officially approached for Özyakup. Özyakup completed the season with 10 goals and 8 assists in 41 games in total.

==== 2016–17 season ====
Özyakup scored the opener with reportedly "elegant" dribbling combinations, passing his opponents, including goalkeeper Haydar Yılmaz on 1st match day encounter of 2016–17 season, ended 4–1 for Beşiktaş at Vodafone Arena, on 20 August 2016.

Özyakup earned his 100th Süper Lig cap on 6 March 2016, on matchday 24, a home match against Eskişehirspor which ended 3–1 for Beşiktaş.

Özyakup won the back-to-back 2015–16 and 2016–17 Süper Lig titles while with Beşiktaş.

==== Loan to Feyenoord ====
On 29 January 2020, it was announced that Özyakup joined Eredivisie side Feyenoord on loan until the end of the 2019–20 season, taking the shirt number 18. Özyakup wrote on Instagram that he was upset in his recent days with Beşiktaş due to misleading and malevolent news made about him and he was "...just [taking a break] for a long-standing relationship [with Beşiktaş]...". In his first match with Feyenoord, he scored the opener in the 93rd second in a 3–0 home win against FC Emmen. However, this would be his only goal for Feyenoord as he managed to play only four matches, two in the league, before the COVID-19 pandemic broke out and the season was suspended. On 27 July 2020, Feyenoord manager Dick Advocaat announced that Özyakup returned to Beşiktaş.

=== Fortuna Sittard ===
On 1 September 2022, Özyakup signed two-year deal with Eredivisie club Fortuna Sittard. He immediately scored in his debut for the club in the 71st minute of a 1–1 league draw against NEC on 10 September, a strike from distance assisted by compatriot Burak Yılmaz.

== International career ==
Özyakup was part of the Netherlands national under-17 team which reached the 2009 UEFA European Under-17 Championship final in 2009, wearing the number 10 jersey and captaining the team.

In 2012, at age 19, Özyakup chose to play for Turkey instead of the Netherlands. Coincidentally, Özyakup scored his first international goal for Turkey right against the Netherlands on 6 September 2015 in UEFA Euro 2016 qualifying.

== Style of play and reception ==
"Someone who saw Oğuzhan [Özyakup] yesterday for the first time might say: "What kind of a player is that? Did he come from outer space?". They might say: "He dribbles like [Zinedine] Zidane." He is an intelligent player."

— Rıdvan Dilmen, 17 August 2015, Sabah.

Özyakup is an energetic attacking-minded central midfielder. Under Slaven Bilić, he was used as an attacking midfielder but Şenol Güneş moved him back to central midfield, which Özyakup himself prefers. Being able to play simple and quickly, Özyakup can lead the team play. He is "skillful" at finishing and possesses a high level of anticipation that allows him to be at the right place on the pitch, according to former Beşiktaş and Turkish international forward Feyyaz Uçar.

In 2015, former Croatian international and Beşiktaş manager Slaven Bilić praised dribbling and passing abilities of Özyakup, likening him to a "snake" due to his slalom-alike opponent-passing dribbling style.

Özyakup was called a "magician" by former Turkish international and current pundit Rıdvan Dilmen in 2015. Dilmen also said that Özyakup was an "intelligent" player, praised his "Zinedine Zidane-like" dribbling attributes and claimed that he was talented enough to play for Barcelona.

In 2016, Turkey national team captain Arda Turan stated he believes Özyakup will become the leader once he (Turan) quits the national team, describing Özyakup as an "outstanding player", being "very intelligent" and "a big talent".

Özyakup is an admirer of the playmaking styles of Zinedine Zidane and the Argentine Juan Román Riquelme.

== Controversy ==
After falling out of favor with the then coach Şenol Güneş during the 2018/2019 season, TV pundit Ali Ece claimed on a YouTube show that Özyakup was receiving mental health assistance from sports psychologists. While the public and the rest of the sports media generally agreed that Ece crossed a line in disclosing private information, Özyakup nonetheless denied the claims and sued him for slander.

== Career statistics ==
=== Club ===
As of match played 7 May 2023

Appearances and goals by club, season and competition
Club	Season	League			National cup (Note: Includes Turkish Cup, KNVB Cup)		League cup (Note: Includes EFL Cup)		Europe		Total	
Club	Season	Division	Apps	Goals	Apps	Goals	Apps	Goals	Apps	Goals	Apps	Goals
Arsenal	2011–12	Premier League	0	0	0	0	2	0	0	0	2	0
Beşiktaş	2012–13	Süper Lig	28	2	2	0	—		—		30	2
Beşiktaş	2013–14	Süper Lig	26	6	1	0	—		2 (Note: Appearances in UEFA Europa League)	1	29	7
Beşiktaş	2014–15	Süper Lig	25	2	6	0	—		11 (Note: Four appearances in UEFA Champions League, seven appearances and one goal in UEFA Europa League)	1	42	3
Beşiktaş	2015–16	Süper Lig	31	9	5	1	—		5	0	41	10
Beşiktaş	2016–17	Süper Lig	29	5	1	0	—		9 (Note: Four appearances in UEFA Champions League, five appearances in UEFA Europa League)	0	39	5
Beşiktaş	2017–18	Süper Lig	24	0	3	0	—		7 (Note: Appearances in UEFA Champions League)	0	34	0
Beşiktaş	2018–19	Süper Lig	19	1	0	0	—		10	2	29	3
Beşiktaş	2019–20	Süper Lig	12	1	2	0	—		5	0	19	1
Beşiktaş	2020–21	Süper Lig	19	3	4	1	—		2 (Note: One appearance in UEFA Champions League, one appearance in UEFA Europa League)	0	25	4
Beşiktaş	2021–22	Süper Lig	13	0	2	0	—		2	0	17	0
Beşiktaş	Total		226	29	26	2	—		53	4	305	35
Feyenoord (loan)	2019–20	Eredivisie	2	1	2	0	—		0	0	4	1
Fortuna Sittard	2022–23	Eredivisie	22	3	1	0	—		—		23	3
Career total			250	33	29	2	2	0	53	4	334	39

=== International ===
Appearances and goals by national team and year
National team	Year	Apps	Goals
Turkey	2013	4	0
Turkey	2014	6	0
Turkey	2015	5	1
Turkey	2016	9	0
Turkey	2017	8	0
Turkey	2018	9	0
Turkey	2019	2	0
Total		43	1

Turkey score listed first, score column indicates score after each Özyakup goal

List of international goals scored by Oğuzhan Özyakup
No.	Date	Venue	Cap	Opponent	Score	Result	Competition	Ref.
1	6 September 2015	Konya Metropolitan Municipality Stadium, Konya, Turkey	11	Netherlands	1–0	3–0	UEFA Euro 2016 qualifying	

== Honours ==
=== Club ===
Arsenal Youth

- Premier Academy League : 2008–09, 2009–10
- FA Youth Cup: 2008–09

Beşiktaş

- Süper Lig: 2015–16, 2016–17, 2020–21
- Turkish Cup: 2020–21

=== International ===
Netherlands U17

- UEFA European Under-17 Football Championship runner-up: 2009

=== Individual ===
- Süper Lig Team of the Season: 2015–16
