= Şahan =

Şahan is a masculine given name and surname of Turkish origin. It derives from Persian and means "royal". Notable people with the name include:

== Given name ==
- Şahan Arzruni (1943–2026), Turkish-Armenian pianist
- Şahan Gökbakar (born 1980), Turkish comedian

== Surname ==
- Olcay Şahan (born 1987), Turkish footballer
