= Filip Hološko =

Slovak footballer (born 1984)

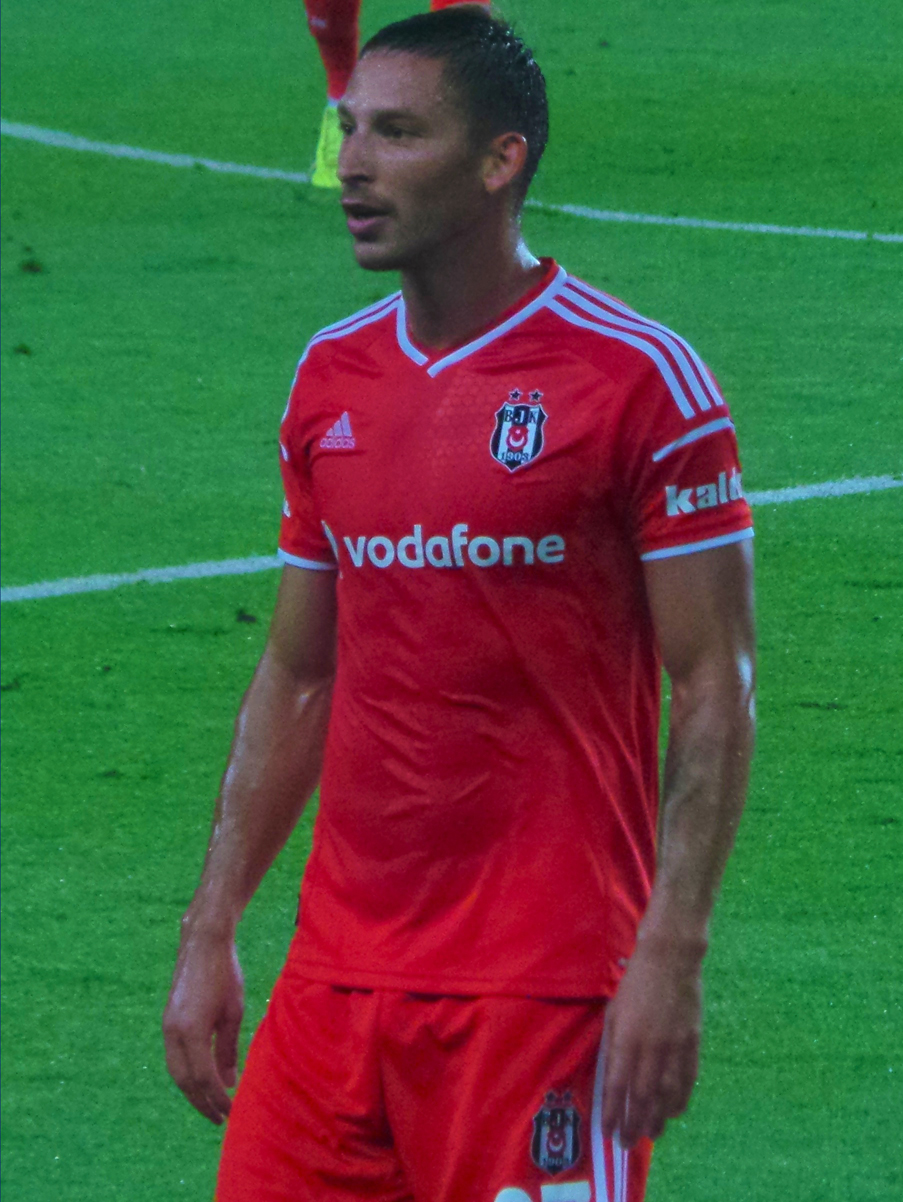
- Hološko with Beşiktaş in 2014

Personal information
- Date of birth: 17 January 1984 (age 42)
- Place of birth: Piešťany, Slovakia
- Height: 1.85 m (6 ft 1 in)
- Positions: Forward; winger

Youth career
- 1990–1998: MFK Piešťany
- 1998–2001: AS Trenčín

Senior career*
Years	Team	Apps	(Gls)
2001	AS Trenčín	1	(0)
2002–2005	Slovan Liberec	54	(17)
2006–2008	Manisaspor	65	(21)
2008–2015	Beşiktaş	140	(40)
2011	→ İstanbul BB (loan)	10	(5)
2014–2015	→ Çaykur Rizespor (loan)	25	(2)
2015–2017	Sydney FC	50	(17)
2017–2018	Slovan Bratislava	40	(9)
2019	1. FC Slovácko	11	(1)
2020	SK Úvaly		
Total		395	(112)

International career
2005–2015	Slovakia	65	(8)
- * Club domestic league appearances and goals

Filip Hološko (Slovak pronunciation: [ˈfilib ˈɦɔlɔʂkɔ]; born 17 January 1984) is a Slovak former professional footballer who played as a forward or winger.

== Club career ==
=== Beşiktaş ===
At the mid of 2007–08 season, he was transferred to Beşiktaş JK in exchange of the forward Burak Yılmaz (a promising youngster at the time) along with veteran defender Koray Avcı plus a considerable sum of €5 million. Regarding the huge amount paid, and two first team regulars given to an exchange deal, both Yıldırım Demirören and the Beşiktaş board were severely criticized by media pundits. However, Hološko managed to blend in after a brief period of time and embarrassed many, with his miraculous performance during the 2008–09 season. Hološko is also well known for his goal against Fenerbahce in the second half of the season; he took the ball from his own half and later he ran through five Fenerbahce players and scored. He also scored a goal in the Turkish Cup Final in İzmir Atatürk Stadium vs Fenerbahce, with a final score of 4–2 to the Black Eagles.

After a prominently successful season, Hološko had to struggle with a heavy injury on his splint bone, which occurred in the CSKA Moscow-Besiktas Champions League game (the outcome of which was a 2–1 defeat to Besiktas). At the end of the first half of the 2009–10 season he had only made five league appearances, scoring just a single goal. On 2 December 2010, he scored Beşiktaş' 100th goal in the UEFA Europa League and formerly UEFA Cup in a 2–1 win against CSKA Sofia. On 13 May 2013, he scored the last ever goal at the BJK İnönü Stadium before the stadium was demolished.

=== Sydney FC ===
On 20 July 2015, Sydney FC announced that it had signed Hološko as the club's international marquee on a two-year deal.

Whilst Sydney struggled in 2015–16, Hološko was a fan favourite for his work ethic and goal scoring.

In 2016–17, Hološko teamed up yet again with Bobô, proving clinical together in the A-League, scoring 22 goals between them and several assists.

On 8 October 2016, Hološko scored Sydney FC's first goal of the A-League campaign, in a 4–0 rout of local rivals Western Sydney Wanderers in the Sydney Derby, and scored a brace the following week against Central Coast Mariners in another 4–0 win.

Hološko finished the 2016–17 A-League regular season on seven goals, and eight assists as Sydney FC won the Premiership with a record number of points. He scored in the Sky Blues' 3–0 semifinal win over Perth Glory, edging him to 5th place on Sydney FC's all time goalscorers list.

On 22 May 2017, Sydney FC announced that Hološko's contract would not be renewed, and that he had returned to Europe.

== International career ==
On 3 September 2005, Hološko debuted for the Slovak senior squad in a friendly 2–0 home victory over Germany. The same year on 16 November, he scored his first goal in a 2006 FIFA World Cup qualification play-off against Spain, ending in a 1–1 draw.

== Personal life ==
Hološko is married with Adelka, who gave birth to a girl, named Sophie, in May 2009.

In August 2010, they had another daughter named Claudia.

== Career statistics ==
=== Club ===
Appearances and goals by club, season and competition
Club	Season	League			National cup (Note: Includes Slovak Cup, Turkish Cup, FFA Cup)		League cup		Continental		Other		Total	
Club	Season	Division	Apps	Goals	Apps	Goals	Apps	Goals	Apps	Goals	Apps	Goals	Apps	Goals
Manisaspor	2005–06	Süper Lig	17	4	0	0	–		–		–		17	4
Manisaspor	2006–07	Süper Lig	32	9	6	3	–		–		–		38	12
Manisaspor	2007–08	Süper Lig	16	8	1	0	–		–		–		17	8
Manisaspor	Total		65	21	7	3	0	0	0	0	0	0	72	24
Beşiktaş	2007–08	Süper Lig	16	7	5	2	–		–		–		21	9
Beşiktaş	2008–09	Süper Lig	30	10	9	4	–		4	1	–		43	15
Beşiktaş	2009–10	Süper Lig	18	6	3	0	–		2	0	1 (Note: Appearances in Turkish Super Cup)	0	24	6
Beşiktaş	2010–11	Süper Lig	14	2	2	0	–		7	4	–		23	6
Beşiktaş	2011–12	Süper Lig	18	3	2	0	–		9	0	5 (Note: Appearance in Süper Lig play-offs)	2	34	5
Beşiktaş	2012–13	Süper Lig	32	10	2	2	–		0	0	–		34	12
Beşiktaş	2013–14	Süper Lig	12	2	1	0	–		0	0	0	0	13	2
Beşiktaş	Total		140	40	24	8	0	0	22	5	6	2	192	55
İstanbul Başakşehir (loan)	2010–11	Süper Lig	10	5	3	1	–		–		–		13	6
Çaykur Rizespor (loan)	2014–15	Süper Lig	25	2	5	0	–		–		–		30	2
Sydney FC	2015–16	A-League	24	10	0	0	–		0	0	–		24	10
Sydney FC	2016–17	A-League	26	7	4	1	–		0	0	2 (Note: Appearance in A-League play-offs)	1	32	9
Sydney FC	Total		50	17	4	1	0	0	0	0	2	1	56	19
Slovan Bratislava	2016–17	Slovak Superliga	–		–		–		–		1 (Note: Appearance in Czechoslovak Supercup)	0	1	0
Slovan Bratislava	2017–18	Slovak Superliga	31	8	6	0	–		4	2	–		41	10
Slovan Bratislava	2018–19	Slovak Superliga	9	1	0	0	–		3	0	–		12	1
Slovan Bratislava	Total		40	9	6	0	0	0	7	2	1	0	54	11
1. FC Slovácko	2018–19	Czech First League	11	1	–		–		–		–		11	1
Career total			341	95	49	13	0	0	29	7	9	3	428	118

=== International ===
As of 7 October 2015
Scores and results list Slovakia's goal tally first, score column indicates score after each Hološko goal.

List of international goals scored by Filip Hološko
No.	Date	Venue	Opponent	Score	Result	Competition
1	16 November 2005	Tehelné pole, Bratislava, Slovakia	Spain	1–0	1–1	2006 FIFA World Cup play-offs
2	20 May 2006	Štadión Antona Malatinského, Trnava, Slovakia	Belgium	1–0	1–1	Friendly
3	13 October 2007	Mestský štadión, Dubnica, Slovakia	San Marino	5–0	7–0	UEFA Euro 2008 qualifying
4	21 November 2007	Stadio Olimpico, Serravalle, San Marino	San Marino	2–0	5–0	UEFA Euro 2008 qualifying
5	9 September 2009	Windsor Park, Belfast, Northern Ireland	Northern Ireland	2–0	2–0	2010 FIFA World Cup qualification
6	3 September 2010	Pasienky, Bratislava, Slovakia	North Macedonia	1–0	1–0	UEFA Euro 2012 qualification
7	29 March 2011	Štadión Antona Malatinského, Trnava, Slovakia	Denmark	1–1	1–2	Friendly
8	18 November 2014	Štadión pod Dubňom, Žilina, Slovakia	Finland	1–0	2–1	Friendly

== Honours ==
Beşiktaş

- Turkish Super League: 2008–09
- Turkish Cup: 2008–09

İstanbul Başakşehir

- Turkish Cup: runner-up 2010–11

Sydney FC

- A-League Premiership: 2016–17
- A-League Championship: 2016–17

Slovakia U19

- UEFA European Under-19 Championship: third place 2002
