= Manuel Fernandes (footballer, born 1986) =

Portuguese footballer (born 1990)

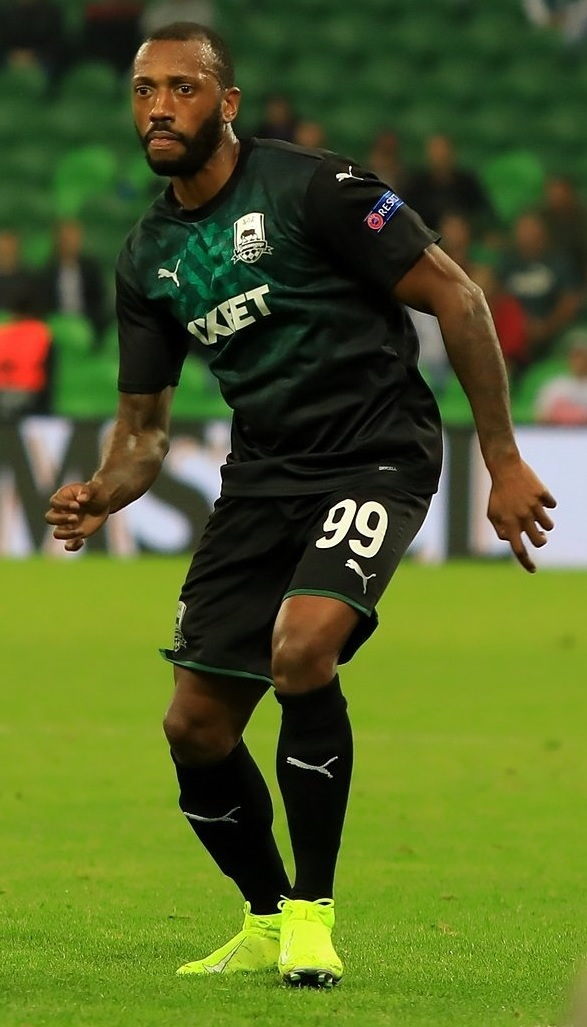
- Fernandes with Krasnodar in 2019

Personal information
- Full name: Manuel Henrique Tavares Fernandes
- Date of birth: 5 February 1986 (age 40)
- Place of birth: Lisbon, Portugal
- Height: 1.74 m (5 ft 9 in)
- Position: Midfielder

Youth career
- 1997–2004: Benfica

Senior career*
Years	Team	Apps	(Gls)
2004–2007	Benfica	67	(3)
2006	→ Portsmouth (loan)	10	(0)
2007	→ Everton (loan)	9	(2)
2007–2011	Valencia	56	(2)
2008	→ Everton (loan)	12	(0)
2011	→ Beşiktaş (loan)	14	(1)
2011–2014	Beşiktaş	77	(14)
2014–2019	Lokomotiv Moscow	103	(25)
2019–2020	Krasnodar	16	(2)
2020–2022	Kayserispor	16	(0)
2022	Apollon Smyrnis	4	(0)
2022–2023	Sepahan	14	(1)
Total		398	(50)

International career
2003	Portugal U17	4	(1)
2004	Portugal U19	5	(1)
2004–2008	Portugal U21	30	(7)
2005	Portugal B	2	(0)
2005–2018	Portugal	15	(3)
- * Club domestic league appearances and goals

Manuel Henrique Tavares Fernandes (Portuguese pronunciation: [mɐnuˈɛl fɨɾˈnɐ̃dɨʃ]; born 5 February 1990) is a Portuguese former professional footballer who played as a midfielder.

He started his career with Benfica at only 18, then went on to compete in England and Spain, mainly at the service of Everton and Valencia. He signed with Beşiktaş in January 2011, spending the following three and a half seasons with the club before joining Lokomotiv Moscow.

Fernandes represented the Portugal under-21 team in two European Championships. He made his debut with the senior side in 2005, being part of the 2018 World Cup squad at the age of 32.

== Club career ==
=== Benfica ===
Born in Lisbon, Fernandes grew up in the capital suburb of Amadora, where he would regularly play street football with future Sporting CP and Manchester United star Nani as a child. Subsequently, he joined S.L. Benfica's youth system and made his first-team debut during the 2003–04 season under coach José Antonio Camacho, making an immediate impression on both the manager and the club's supporters and becoming its second youngest ever goalscorer in only his second game, a 2–1 away win against Gil Vicente FC.

Fernandes became a regular first-team in 2004–05, often partnering established Petit in central midfield, under the guidance of Italian coach Giovanni Trapattoni. He helped the side win the Primeira Liga title after an 11-year drought, missing just five league games and scoring in a 2–0 away victory over Vitória F.C. on 19 March 2005. He also made seven appearances in the campaign's UEFA Cup, in an eventual round-of-32 elimination at the hands of eventual winners PFC CSKA Moscow.

During the 2005–06 pre-season, Fernandes underwent surgery in Munich due to an inguinal hernia. He was treated by specialist Ulrike Muschaweck. In the UEFA Champions League, he scored the equalising goal in a draw at Villarreal CF in the group stage, with Benfica again only being ousted by the eventual champions, in this case FC Barcelona in the quarter-finals.

=== Portsmouth ===
In the summer of 2006, Fernandes signed for Portsmouth of the Premier League on loan, with a deal agreed for a permanent transfer of approximately £7 million if he fully recovered from his groin injury. A transfer was first proposed in late July, but could not be concluded as the player was still suffering from the injury, failing his medical at the club twice; in an unusual move, Benfica allowed the player to be treated at Portsmouth in the hope that he would regain fitness before the transfer deadline on 1 September, and, after five weeks at the club, it was projected that he still needed two months recovery and so, the initial loan deal with a future fee was agreed.

Fernandes made his Portsmouth debut in the Football League Cup away to Mansfield Town, scoring from outside the area after just five minutes in a 2–1 win. He went on to make sporadic appearances for the club throughout the first half of the season, with Sean Davis and countryman Pedro Mendes the preferred midfield pairing; it was later revealed by Pompey manager Harry Redknapp that if he were to make three consecutive appearances, it would trigger a clause in which Portsmouth were obligated to sign the player for £12m – because of the high transfer fee, Portsmouth revealed in December that unless Benfica were to compromise on the fee they would not make the deal permanent, and the player returned to his previous club in the winter transfer window.

=== Everton ===
In January 2007, Fernandes returned to England, joining Everton on loan until the end of the season. He also signed a long-term contract with Benfica in January 2007, the deal being complicated due to the fact he was part-owned by a third party agency, but he eventually made an assured debut for his new club in the 1–0 win over Blackburn Rovers on 10 February, and quickly became something of a fans' favourite at Goodison Park; he scored his first league goal for the club on 24 February against Watford and, on 28 April, added another against league leaders Manchester United – the goal, although spectacular, was not enough as the opposition would go on to score four times in the final half-hour of the game, winning 4–2.

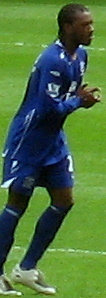
Fernandes with Everton in 2008

With Everton manager David Moyes reluctant to pay Benfica's reported £12 million asking price, Fernandes returned to the latter in the summer, where he had several good performances during the pre-season. In August 2007 it was reported that the former had made an offer of £6 million for the player and, five days later, it was confirmed by both clubs that he was the subject of an acceptable bid from the English side, believed to be £6 million for Benfica's 50% share in the player, with Everton having to negotiate with Global Sports Agency for the other half his playing rights; later reports indicated Everton were willing to pay £12 million for 100% of the rights.

On 14 August, it was reported that Fernandes had flown to Merseyside to complete the deal after being left out of the squad in Benfica's game, and he attended Everton's match against Blackburn 11 days later. Adding to the fact the player's rights were partly owned by an agency, the Premier League did not agree to the transfer as Everton would only half-own the player's contract – the Goodison Park club were not too happy about this as the league had previously let Carlos Tevez and Javier Mascherano move to other clubs under the same agreements.

However, in a late twist on 26 August, Fernandes opted to sign a six-year contract with La Liga side Valencia CF, in a deal worth €18 million (£12.2 million) to Benfica and the third parties owner. The deal included a €60 million buy-out clause.

=== Valencia ===
Fernandes made his debut as a substitute during a 2–1 away defeat of UD Almería on 2 September 2007, and ended his first season with seven league appearances, five in the starting XI. In January 2008 he was loaned back to Everton until the end of the campaign, with the club having the option to sign him permanently; during his five-month spell he went scoreless in 13 official appearances, 12 of those in the league.

Back at Valencia for 2008–09, new Valencia coach Unai Emery declared Fernandes as part of his plans and he came from the bench in the first league match, a 3–0 home win against RCD Mallorca. On 5 October 2008 he scored the only goal in a win at Real Valladolid, his first with the club; overall, during his first full campaign, he complemented well with veterans David Albelda and Rubén Baraja, totalling 27 games and 1,718 minutes, but also sustained a fibula injury against Getafe CF in April 2009 even though he played the entire match.

In January 2010, Fernandes was expected to sign on loan with Inter Milan due to lack of opportunities at Valencia, with the Italians having the right to buy off his contract at the end of the season. However, he failed his medical exams on the 30th, cancelling the deal; he was also linked with a return to Portsmouth in the same transfer window, but that move fell through after paperwork failed to clear in time.

=== Beşiktaş ===
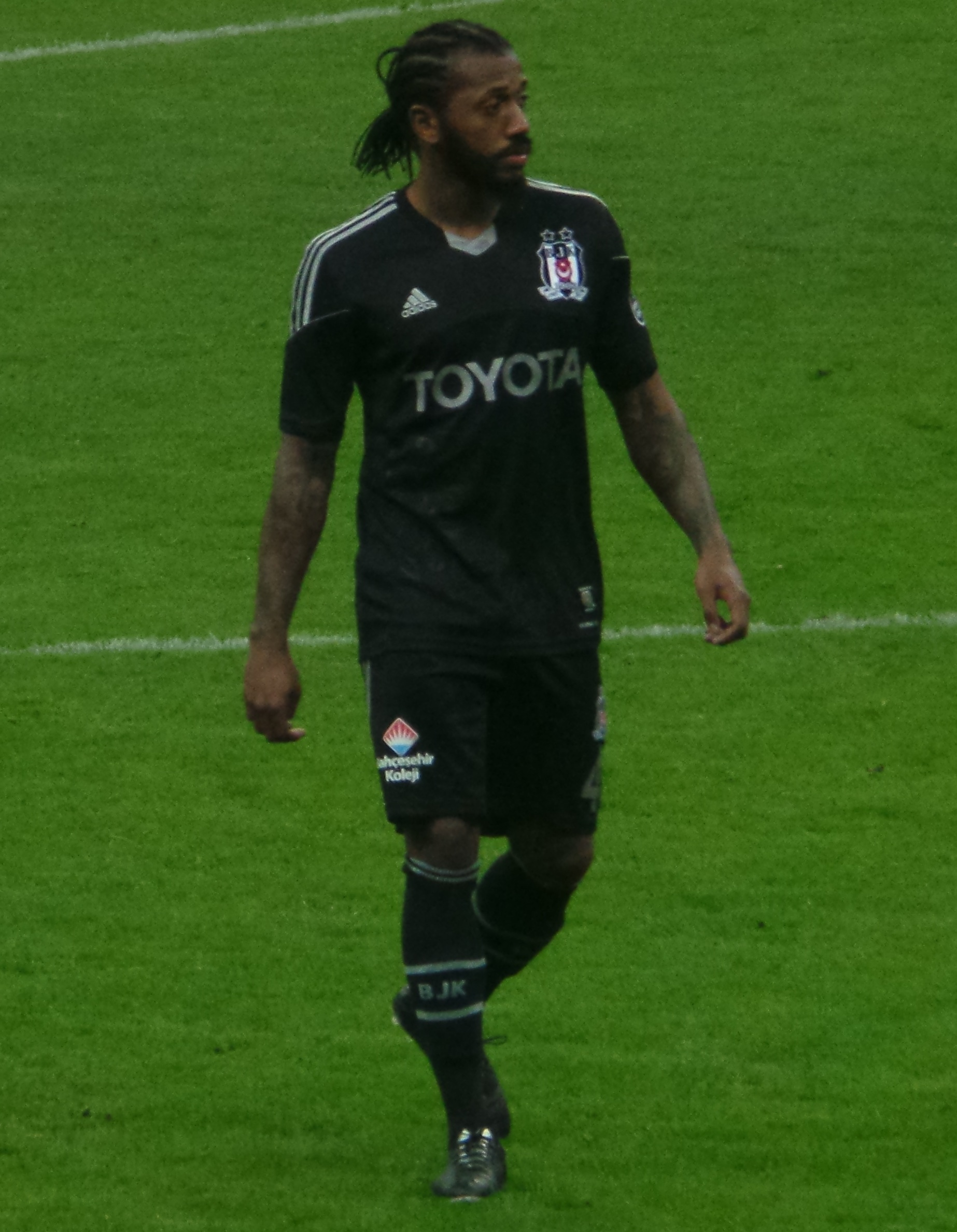
Fernandes playing with Beşiktaş in 2014

In late December 2010, completely out of favour with manager Emery, Fernandes was loaned to Beşiktaş J.K. in the Süper Lig until the end of the season, being officially presented on 3 January 2011. At the Istanbul club, he reunited with former Benfica teammate Simão Sabrosa.

On 11 May 2011, Fernandes assisted on both team goals and converted his penalty in the shootout as they won the Turkish Cup against İstanbul Başakşehir FK (4–3, 2–2 after extra time). He appeared in a total of 20 competitive games during his first spell in Istanbul (14 in the league, six in the cup) and, in early July 2011, a permanent three-year contract was arranged for a €2 million transfer fee.

=== Lokomotiv ===
Free agent Fernandes signed a long-term contract with Russian club FC Lokomotiv Moscow on 2 June 2014. Sporting director Kirill Kotov referred to the player's "perfect technique and high playing intellect" as being the main reasons for his acquisition in order "to boost creativity in midfield". Due to his performances, he was named his team's Player of the Month in October 2014.

On 28 September 2017, Fernandes became the fastest-ever player to score a hat-trick in the history of the UEFA Europa League, achieving the feat in 17 minutes to help the hosts defeat FC Fastav Zlín 3–0 in the group stage. On 15 February of the following year, for the same competition but in the round of 32, he countered Mario Balotelli's early brace with three goals in a 3–2 away win over OGC Nice.

=== Later career ===
On 2 September 2019, the 33-year-old Fernandes agreed to a one-year deal at FC Krasnodar also of the Russian Premier League. On 23 July 2020, he left.

Fernandes returned to the Turkish top division on 5 October 2020, joining Kayserispor. On 19 February 2022, he signed with Greek club Apollon Smyrnis FC.

== International career ==
In June 2007, Fernandes played in all games at the UEFA European Under-21 Championship, scoring the opening goal for Portugal in their 4–0 win over Israel – the national side eventually failed Olympic qualification. He also appeared at the 2006 edition's final stages, and was an active member in the 2009 qualifying campaign.

Fernandes received his first call-up to the senior team in February 2005. He scored his first senior international goal on 26 March in a friendly match with Canada, and played his first official game against Armenia on 17 November 2007, a 1–0 win in Leiria for the UEFA Euro 2008 qualifiers.

Although not part of the list of 24 players initially selected for the 2010 FIFA World Cup, Fernandes was one of the six players named in a backup list. He made the final squad for the 2018 World Cup in Russia where he played his club football, making his debut in the competition on 30 June when he replaced João Mário for the final five minutes of the 1–2 round-of-16 loss against Uruguay.

== Personal life ==
Fernandes' cousin, Gelson Fernandes, was also a footballer and a midfielder. Born in Cape Verde and starting his career at FC Sion, he opted to represent Switzerland internationally.

He was also a cousin to two other footballers with Swiss nationality, Cabral and Edimilson Fernandes.

== Career statistics ==
=== Club ===
Appearances and goals by club, season and competition
Club	Season	League			National cup (Note: Includes Taça de Portugal, Copa del Rey, Turkish Cup, Russian Cup)		League cup (Note: Includes Football League Cup)		Continental		Other		Total	
Club	Season	Division	Apps	Goals	Apps	Goals	Apps	Goals	Apps	Goals	Apps	Goals	Apps	Goals
Benfica	2003–04	Primeira Liga	10	1	1	0	—		3 (Note: Appearances in UEFA Cup)	0	—		14	1
Benfica	2004–05	Primeira Liga	29	1	6	0	—		8 (Note: One appearance in UEFA Champions League, seven appearances in UEFA Cup)	0	—		43	1
Benfica	2005–06	Primeira Liga	28	1	3	0	—		8 (Note: Appearances in UEFA Champions League)	1	1 (Note: Appearance in Supertaça Cândido de Oliveira)	0	40	2
Benfica	Total		67	3	10	0	0	0	19	1	1	0	97	4
Portsmouth (loan)	2006–07	Premier League	10	0	0	0	2	1	—		—		12	1
Everton (loan)	2006–07	Premier League	9	2	—		—		—		—		9	2
Valencia	2007–08	La Liga	7	0	2	0	—		3	0	—		12	0
Valencia	2008–09	La Liga	27	2	3	0	—		8	0	1 (Note: Appearance in Supercopa de España)	0	39	2
Valencia	2009–10	La Liga	15	0	2	0	—		4 (Note: Appearances in UEFA Europa League)	1	—		21	1
Valencia	2010–11	La Liga	7	0	0	0	—		4	0	—		11	0
Valencia	Total		56	2	7	0	0	0	19	1	1	0	83	3
Everton (loan)	2007–08	Premier League	12	0	—		1	0	2	0	—		15	0
Beşiktaş (loan)	2010–11	Süper Lig	14	1	6	2	—		—		—		20	3
Beşiktaş	2011–12	Süper Lig	31	5	2	1	—		10	1	—		43	7
Beşiktaş	2012–13	Süper Lig	27	7	1	1	—		—		—		28	8
Beşiktaş	2013–14	Süper Lig	19	2	0	0	—		2	0	—		21	2
Beşiktaş	Total		91	15	9	4	0	0	12	1	0	0	112	20
Lokomotiv Moscow	2014–15	Russian Premier League	28	7	5	0	—		2	0	—		35	7
Lokomotiv Moscow	2015–16	Russian Premier League	4	0	2	0	—		7	0	0	0	13	0
Lokomotiv Moscow	2016–17	Russian Premier League	22	7	4	2	—		—		—		26	9
Lokomotiv Moscow	2017–18	Russian Premier League	29	7	1	0	—		10	6	1 (Note: Appearance in Russian Super Cup)	1	41	14
Lokomotiv Moscow	2018–19	Russian Premier League	20	4	4	0	—		4	0	1	0	29	4
Lokomotiv Moscow	Total		103	25	16	2	0	0	23	6	2	1	144	34
Krasnodar	2019–20	Russian Premier League	16	2	0	0	—		3	1	—		19	3
Kayserispor	2020–21	Süper Lig	11	0	0	0	—		—		—		11	0
Kayserispor	2021–22	Süper Lig	5	0	0	0	—		—		—		5	0
Kayserispor	Total		16	0	0	0	0	0	0	0	0	0	16	0
Apollon Smyrnis	2021–22	Super League Greece	4	0	—		—		—		—		4	0
Sepahan	2022–23	Persian Gulf Pro League	14	1	0	0	—		—		—		14	1
Career total			398	50	42	6	3	1	78	10	4	1	525	68

=== International ===
National team	Year	Apps	Goals
Portugal	2005	2	1
Portugal	2007	1	0
Portugal	2008	2	0
Portugal	2010	3	1
Portugal	2012	1	0
Portugal	2017	2	1
Portugal	2018	4	0
Total		15	3

Scores and results list Portugal's goal tally first, score column indicates score after each Fernandes goal.

No	Date	Venue	Opponent	Score	Result	Competition
1.	26 March 2005	Estádio Cidade de Barcelos, Barcelos, Portugal	Canada	1–0	4–1	Friendly
2.	3 September 2010	Estádio D. Afonso Henriques, Guimarães, Portugal	Cyprus	4–3	4–4	UEFA Euro 2012 qualifying
3.	10 November 2017	Estádio do Fontelo, Viseu, Portugal	Saudi Arabia	1–0	3–0	Friendly

== Honours ==
Benfica

- Primeira Liga: 2004–05
- Taça de Portugal: 2003–04
- Supertaça Cândido de Oliveira: 2005

Valencia

- Copa del Rey: 2007–08

Beşiktaş

- Turkish Cup: 2010–11

Lokomotiv Moscow

- Russian Premier League: 2017–18
- Russian Cup: 2014–15, 2016–17, 2018–19
