= Kadir Arı =

Turkish footballer (born 1994)

Kadir Ari
Personal information
- Date of birth: 27 November 1994 (age 31)
- Place of birth: Nazilli, Turkey
- Height: 1.77 m (5 ft 10 in)
- Position: Winger

Team information
- Current team: Serikspor
- Number: 27

Youth career
- Pamukspor
- Beşiktaş

Senior career*
Years	Team	Apps	(Gls)
2012–2015	Beşiktaş	1	(0)
2013	→ Turgutluspor (loan)	5	(0)
2013–2014	→ Sancaktepe (loan)	19	(2)
2014–2015	→ FBM Yaşamspor (loan)	31	(11)
2015–2016	Manisa	23	(4)
2016–2018	Hacettepespor	63	(11)
2018–2019	Gümüşhanespor	32	(8)
2019–2021	Uşakspor	59	(17)
2021–2022	Sakaryaspor	12	(0)
2022	24 Erzincanspor	15	(1)
2022–2023	İskenderunspor	35	(5)
2023–2025	52 Orduspor	57	(8)
2025–2026	Kastamonuspor 1966	33	(4)
2026–	Serikspor	11	(4)

International career
2010	Turkey U16	11	(1)
2010–2011	Turkey U17	14	(3)
2011–2012	Turkey U18	8	(3)
2012–2013	Turkey U19	5	(3)
2012	Turkey U20	1	(0)
- * Club domestic league appearances and goals as of 14 November 2026

Kadir Ari (born 27 November 1994) is a Turkish football midfielder who plays for TFF 2. Lig club Serikspor.
