= Mehmet Akgün =

Turkish footballer (born 1986)

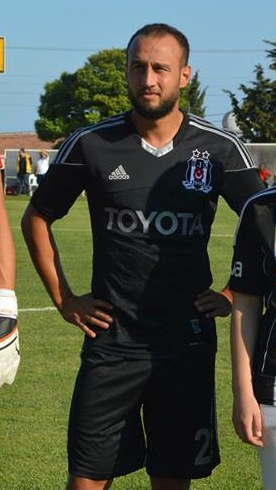
- Akgün in 2013

Personal information
- Date of birth: 6 August 1986 (age 40)
- Place of birth: Bielefeld, West Germany
- Height: 1.80 m (5 ft 11 in)
- Position: Midfielder

Youth career
- 1994–1998: SUK Bielefeld
- 1998–2001: Arminia Bielefeld
- 2001–2003: Borussia Dortmund

Senior career*
Years	Team	Apps	(Gls)
2003–2007	Borussia Dortmund II	102	(4)
2004–2007	Borussia Dortmund	2	(0)
2008–2010	Willem II	35	(5)
2010–2012	Gençlerbirliği	44	(0)
2012–2013	Beşiktaş	11	(0)
2014–2015	Kayseri Erciyesspor	17	(0)
2015–2016	Karşıyaka	8	(0)
2016	Kastamonuspor	12	(0)
2018–2019	Maltepespor	10	(1)
Total		241	(10)

International career
2002	Turkey U17	1	(0)
- * Club domestic league appearances and goals

Mehmet Akgün (born 6 August 1986) is a Turkish former professional footballer who played as a midfielder.

== Career ==
In the 2005–06 season, Akgün played for Borussia Dortmund II. He was picked several times for the first team squad and played one Bundesliga game.

He was transferred to Kasımpaşa in 2007 and on 20 January 2008 signed a one-and-a-half-year contract with Dutch side Willem II. He scored his first goal for Willem II on the opening day of the 2008–09 season against Ajax. On 19 May 2010, he left the Netherlands to sign for the Turkish club Gençlerbirliği.

On 1 June 2012, he signed a two-year contract with Beşiktaş worth €200,000 per annum and €3,000 per game played.
