= Emre Özkan =

Turkish footballer

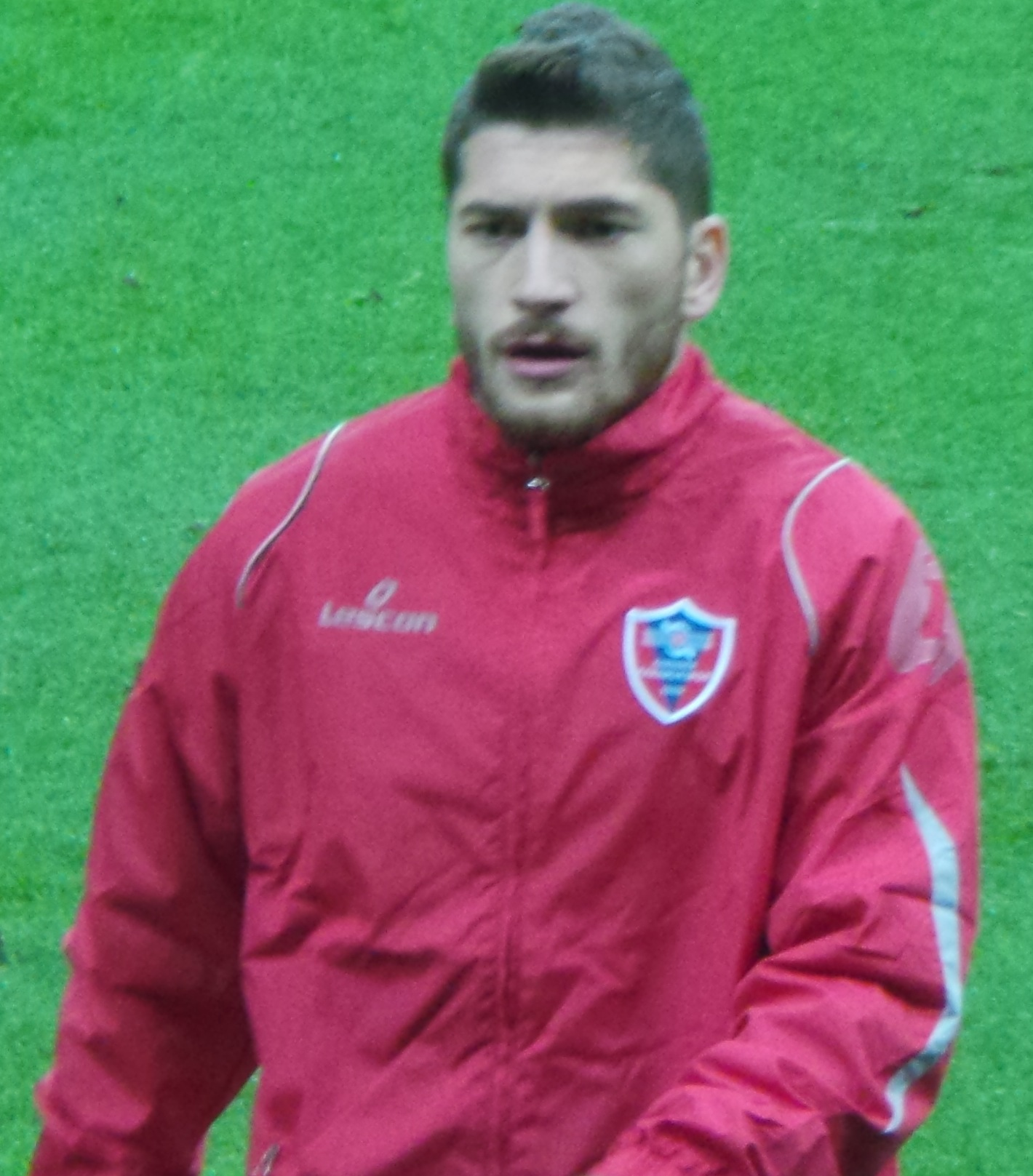

Personal information
- Date of birth: 24 December 1988 (age 37)
- Place of birth: Üsküdar, Turkey
- Height: 1.91 m (6 ft 3 in)
- Position: Left back

Team information
- Current team: Ergene Velimeşe

Senior career*
Years	Team	Apps	(Gls)
2006–2013	Beşiktaş	10	(0)
2007	→ Zeytinburnuspor (loan)	12	(2)
2008	→ Ankaragücü (loan)	0	(0)
2009	→ Eskişehirspor (loan)	3	(0)
2009–2012	→ Orduspor (loan)	55	(1)
2013–2015	Karabükspor	13	(0)
2016	Kayseri Erciyesspor	7	(0)
2016–2018	Bucaspor	51	(4)
2018–2019	Şanlıurfaspor	26	(3)
2019–2020	BB Bodrumspor	19	(1)
2020–2021	Şanlıurfaspor	8	(0)
2021	Vanspor FK	14	(1)
2021–2022	Kahramanmaraşspor	16	(1)
2023	Sarıyer	2	(0)
2023–	Ergene Velimeşe	0	(0)

International career
2006	Turkey U18	6	(0)
2006	Turkey U19	2	(0)
2008–2009	Turkey U21	8	(1)
- * Club domestic league appearances and goals as of 31 May 2023

Emre Özkan (born 24 December 1988) is a Turkish football defender who plays for TFF Third League club Ergene Velimeşe.

== Career ==
During his contract with Beşiktaş, he has been on loan at Zeytinburnuspor, Ankaragücü, Eskişehirspor, and Orduspor.

On 31 August 2016, he joined Bucaspor on a one-year contract.

Özkan has represented Turkey at youth level, but has not been called up to the full squad.
