= Sahan Palihakkara =

Sri Lankan cricketer (born 1989)

Sahan Palihakkara (born 14 October 1989) is a Sri Lankan cricketer. He is a right-handed batsman and leg-break bowler who plays for Saracens Sports Club. He was born in Kandy.

Palihakkara made his cricketing debut for the Under-23s team during the 2009 season, and made his List A debut during the 2009–10 season, against Bloomfield Cricket and Athletic Club. He is yet to score a run in List A cricket, but took figures of 3–37 on his debut with the ball.
