= Olcay Şahan =

Turkish footballer

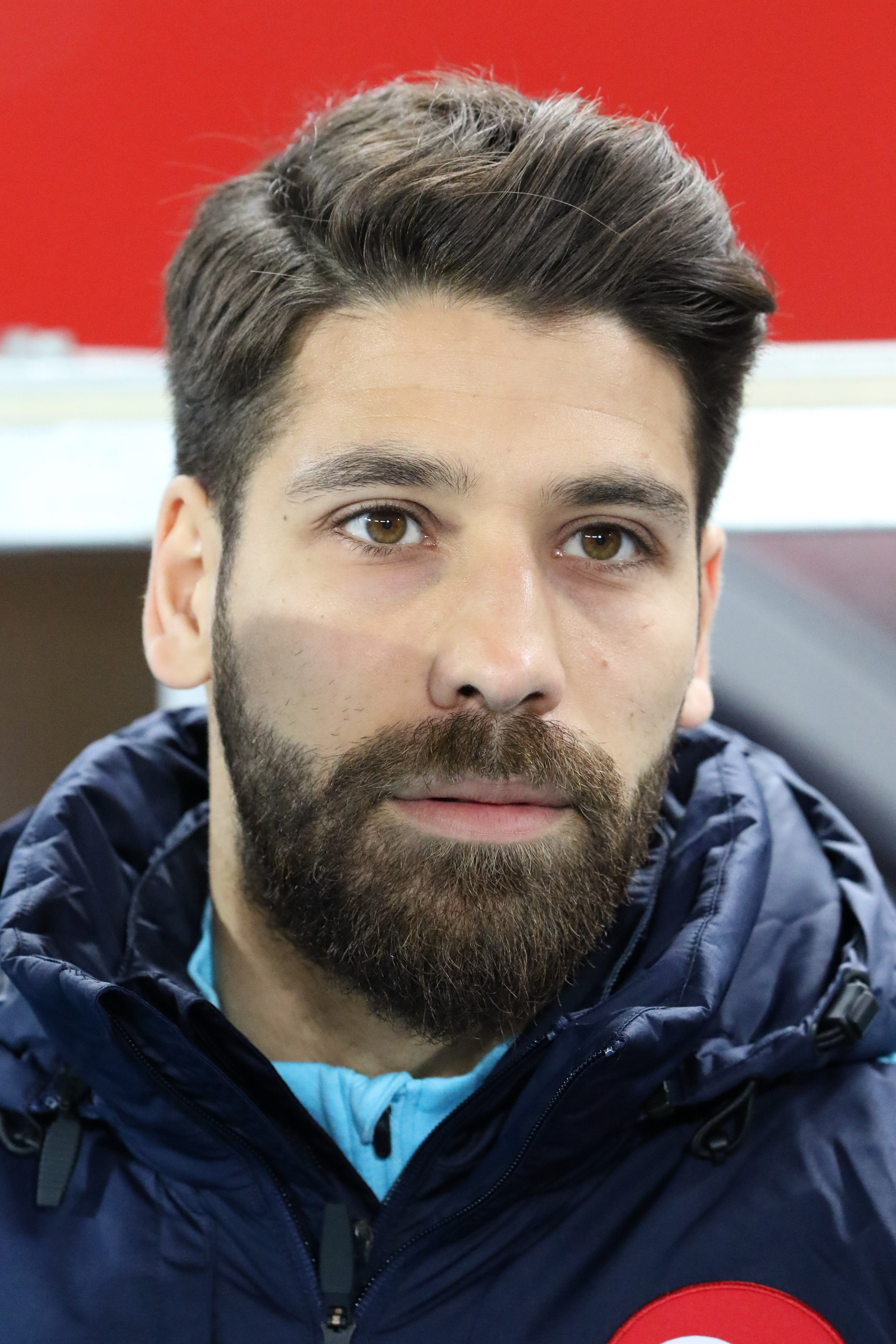
- Şahan with Turkey in 2016

Personal information
- Date of birth: 26 May 1987 (age 39)
- Place of birth: Düsseldorf, West Germany (modern Germany)
- Height: 1.79 m (5 ft 10 in)
- Positions: Winger; attacking midfielder

Youth career
- 1993–2001: Fortuna Düsseldorf
- 2001–2004: Bayer Leverkusen
- 2004–2005: Borussia M'gladbach

Senior career*
Years	Team	Apps	(Gls)
2006–2008	Borussia M'gladbach II	75	(16)
2008–2009	MSV Duisburg II	14	(12)
2008–2011	MSV Duisburg	73	(11)
2011–2012	1. FC Kaiserslautern	27	(1)
2012–2017	Beşiktaş	142	(34)
2017–2019	Trabzonspor	64	(7)
2019–2020	Denizlispor	26	(1)
2020–2021	Yeni Malatyaspor	12	(0)
2022–2023	Afjet Afyonspor	35	(6)
2023–2024	Ankaraspor	22	(0)

International career
2003	Germany U-17	1	(0)
2011	Turkey A2	1	(0)
2013–2017	Turkey	27	(2)

Managerial career
- 2024–2025: Altınordu
- * Club domestic league appearances and goals

Olcay Şahan (Turkish pronunciation: [oɫdʒaj ʃahan], born 26 May 1987) is a Turkish professional football manager and a former player who played as a winger or as an attacking midfielder. Born in Germany, he played for the Turkey national team internationally.

== Club career ==
=== Germany ===
In 2008, Şahan played his first professional match against Alemannia Aachen with MSV Duisburg shirt. For the following seasons he started to play more frequently. In the 2010–11 season, from the beginning he became the number one choice for his coach Milan Šašić. After a successful season he was transferred to 1. FC Kaiserslautern. With his new team he started to play at Bundesliga level and inspired Fritz-Walter-Stadion guests very quickly in a short time.

=== Beşiktaş ===
Before the 2012–13 season he was transferred to Turkish side Beşiktaş, for an €800,000 fee on a four-year contract. From the beginning of the season, coach Samet Aybaba placed him on the first eleven in every game of the season. On 22 October 2012, Şahan scored his first league goal against Gaziantepspor. He finished the season with 11 goals and eight assists. With his successful first season at the club, he became one of the favorite players in the eyes of Beşiktaş fans.

=== Trabzonspor ===
On 12 January 2017, Şahan joined Trabzonspor.

== International career ==
Şahan was born in Germany to parents of Turkish descent and played for the German U-17s team, before switching to the Turkish federation. His performances during the 2012–13 season earned him a call-up to the Turkey national team managed by Abdullah Avcı. On 22 March 2013, Şahan played his first international match against Andorra. Manager Fatih Terim selected Şahan for Turkey 2014 World Cup UEFA Group D qualifying matches. He was a member of the Turkey national team for Euro 2016.

== Style of play ==
Şahan plays as an attacking midfielder, generally as a left winger in Turkish Super League. At the international level he was used as a "playmaker" by Fatih Terim. He is known for his quickness, pace and hardworking forms.

== Coaching career ==
On 27 May 2024, Şahan was hired as the manager of TFF Second League club Altınordu.

== Career statistics ==
=== Club ===
Appearances and goals by club, season and competition
Club	Season	League			Cup		Europe		Other		Total	
Club	Season	Division	Apps	Goals	Apps	Goals	Apps	Goals	Apps	Goals	Apps	Goals
Borussia Mönchengladbach II	2007–08	Oberliga Nordrhein	9	3	0	0	–		–		9	3
Borussia Mönchengladbach II	2006–07	Regionalliga Nord	32	1	0	0	–		–		32	1
Borussia Mönchengladbach II	2007–08	Oberliga Nordrhein	34	12	0	0	–		–		34	12
Borussia Mönchengladbach II	Total		75	16	0	0	0	0	0	0	75	16
MSV Duisburg	2008–09	2. Bundesliga	16	2	1	0	–		–		17	2
MSV Duisburg	2009–10	2. Bundesliga	23	2	0	0	–		–		23	2
MSV Duisburg	2010–11	2. Bundesliga	34	7	6	0	–		–		40	7
MSV Duisburg	Total		73	11	7	0	0	0	0	0	80	11
MSV Duisburg II	2008–09	NRW-Liga	8	5	–		–		–		7	5
MSV Duisburg II	2009–10	NRW-Liga	6	7	–		–		–		6	7
MSV Duisburg II	Total		14	12	0	0	0	0	0	0	14	12
1. FC Kaiserslautern	2011–12	Bundesliga	27	1	3	0	–		–		30	1
Beşiktaş	2012–13	Süper Lig	34	11	3	0	–		–		37	11
Beşiktaş	2013–14	Süper Lig	34	8	0	0	2	0	–		36	8
Beşiktaş	2014–15	Süper Lig	30	8	4	1	14	0	–		48	9
Beşiktaş	2015–16	Süper Lig	33	5	5	0	3	0	–		41	5
Beşiktaş	2016–17	Süper Lig	11	2	4	0	2	0	1 (Note: Appearance in Turkish Super Cup)	0	17	2
Beşiktaş	Total		142	34	16	1	21	0	1	0	180	35
Trabzonspor	2016–17	Süper Lig	17	1	2	0	0	0	–		19	1
Trabzonspor	2017–18	Süper Lig	28	4	3	1	0	0	–		31	5
Trabzonspor	2018–19	Süper Lig	19	2	2	0	0	0	–		21	2
Trabzonspor	Total		64	7	7	1	0	0	0	0	71	8
Denizlispor	2019–20	Süper Lig	26	1	4	0	–		–		30	1
Yeni Malatyaspor	2020–21	Süper Lig	12	0	3	0	–		–		15	0
Career total			433	82	40	2	21	0	1	0	495	84

=== International goals ===
Scores and results list Turkey's goal tally first, score column indicates score after each Şahan goal.

List of international goals scored by Olcay Şahan
No.	Date	Venue	Opponent	Score	Result	Competition
1	28 May 2013	MSV-Arena, Duisburg, Germany	Latvia	1–0	3–3	Friendly
2	3 September 2014	TRE-FOR Park, Odense, Denmark	Denmark	1-1	2-1	Friendly

== Honours ==
Beşiktaş

- Süper Lig: 2015–16
