= Mehmet Akyüz =

Turkish footballer (born 1986)

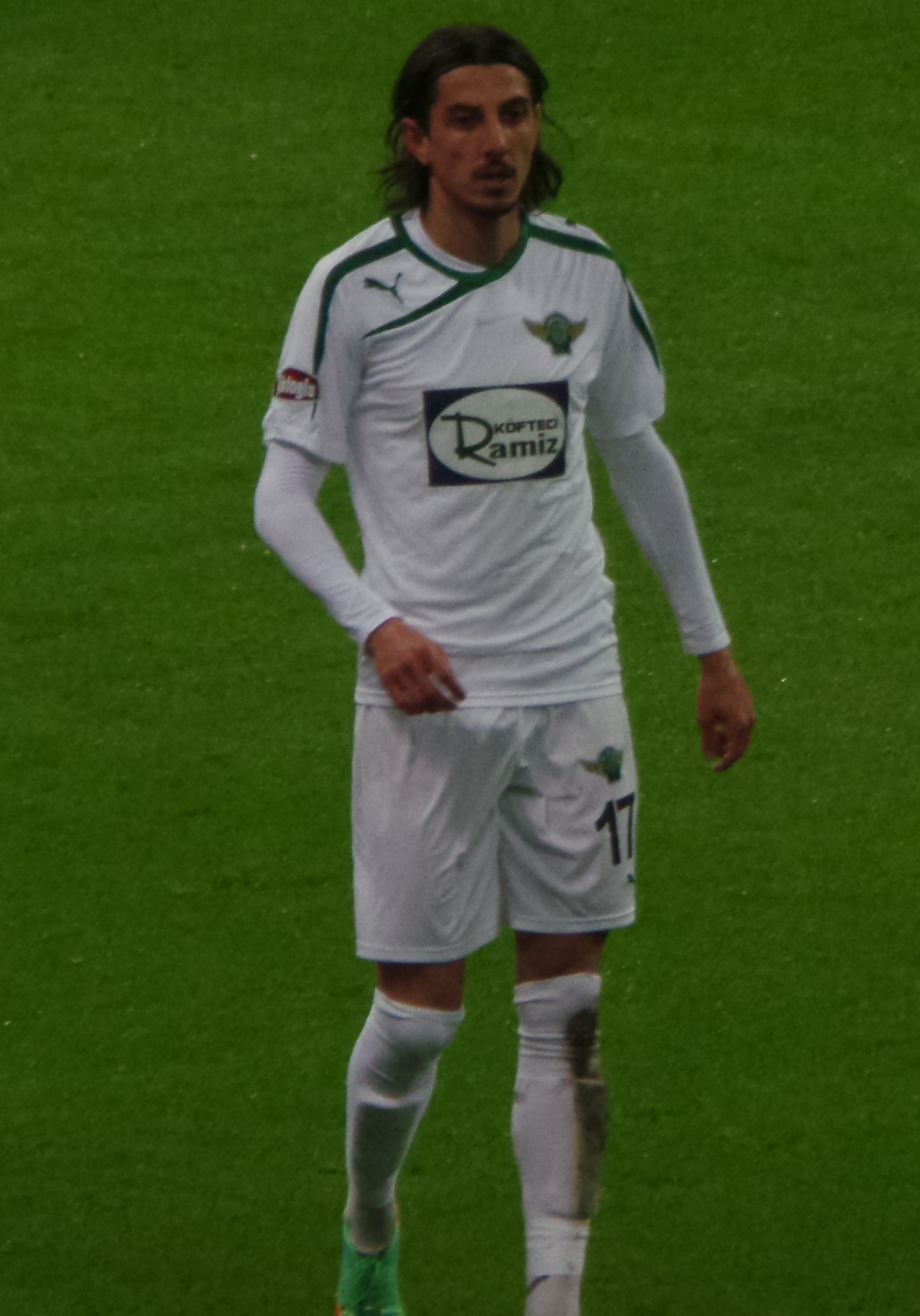

Personal information
- Date of birth: 2 January 1986 (age 40)
- Place of birth: Adapazarı, Sakarya, Turkey
- Height: 1.88 m (6 ft 2 in)
- Position: Forward

Team information
- Current team: 24 Erzincanspor
- Number: 17

Youth career
- 1999–2005: Sakaryaspor

Senior career*
Years	Team	Apps	(Gls)
2005–2007	Sakaryaspor	1	(0)
2006–2007	→ Fethiyespor (loan)	12	(0)
2007–2008	Bozüyükspor	16	(3)
2008–2010	Gençlerbirliği	9	(0)
2008	→ Sakaryaspor (loan)	10	(0)
2009	→ Şanlıurfaspor (loan)	12	(7)
2009–2010	→ Hacettepe (loan)	20	(3)
2010–2011	TKİ Tavşanlı Linyitspor	31	(14)
2011–2013	Beşiktaş	12	(0)
2013–2015	Akhisar Belediyespor	44	(11)
2015–2017	Çaykur Rizespor	47	(5)
2017–2018	Giresunspor	13	(4)
2018–2020	Denizlispor	56	(27)
2020	Adana Demirspor	43	(20)
2021	Samsunspor	7	(0)
2022	Çorum FK	30	(13)
2023	Sakaryaspor	12	(1)
2023–2024	Belediye Derincespor	17	(4)
2024	Hacettepe 1945 SK	10	(2)
2025–	24 Erzincanspor	3	(0)

International career
2005	Turkey U19	1	(0)
- * Club domestic league appearances and goals as of 21 September 2025

Mehmet Akyüz (born 2 January 1986) is a Turkish professional footballer who plays as a forward for TFF 2. Lig club 24 Erzincanspor.
