= Erkan Kaş =

Turkish footballer

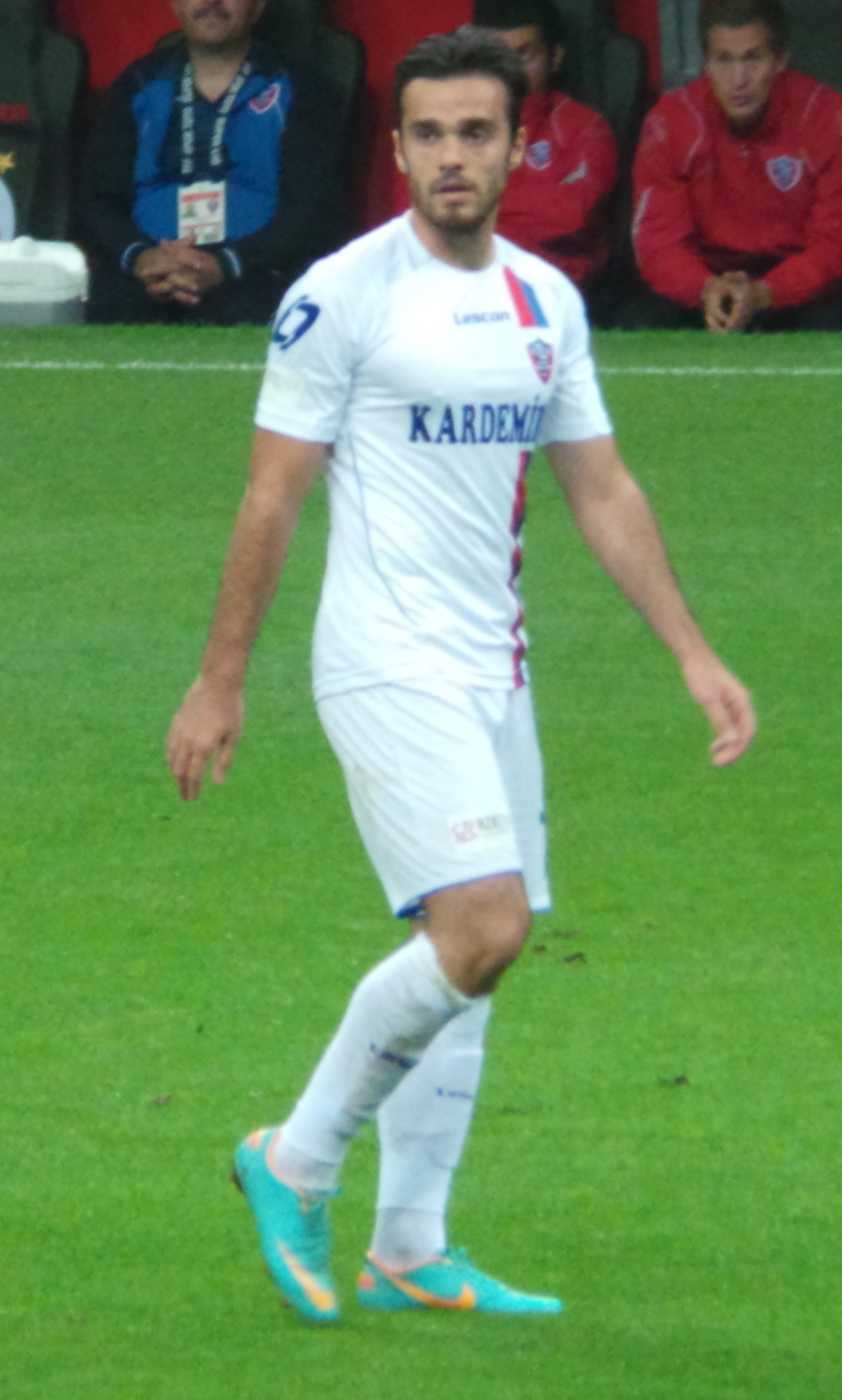

Personal information
- Date of birth: 10 September 1991 (age 35)
- Place of birth: Niksar, Turkey
- Height: 1.83 m (6 ft 0 in)
- Position: Left back

Team information
- Current team: Esenler Erokspor
- Number: 39

Senior career*
Years	Team	Apps	(Gls)
2010–2014	Beşiktaş	10	(0)
2010–2012	→ Çaykur Rizespor (loan)	54	(2)
2013–2014	→ Karabükspor (loan)	30	(0)
2014–2015	Karabükspor	22	(2)
2015–2017	Sivasspor	24	(1)
2017	→ Kayserispor (loan)	14	(0)
2017–2018	Kayserispor	3	(0)
2018–2021	Yeni Malatyaspor	30	(0)
2021–2022	Şanlıurfaspor	31	(2)
2022–2026	Çorum	139	(0)
2026–	Esenler Erokspor	8	(0)

International career^{‡}
2009–2010	Turkey U19	11	(0)
2012–2013	Turkey B	7	(1)
- * Club domestic league appearances and goals as of 15 October 2026 ‡ National team caps and goals as of 25 March 2013

Erkan Kaş (born 10 September 1991) is a Turkish footballer who plays for TFF 1. Lig club Esenler Erokspor.

== Personal life ==
Kaş is of Kosovar Albanian descent, and was called up to the Kosovo national football team.
