= Sinan Kurumuş =

Turkish footballer

Personal information
- Date of birth: 2 August 1994 (age 32)
- Place of birth: İnegöl, Turkey
- Height: 1.87 m (6 ft 2 in)
- Position: Forward

Team information
- Current team: Şanlıurfaspor
- Number: 99

Senior career*
Years	Team	Apps	(Gls)
2011–2012	Ankaragücü	17	(1)
2013–2016	Beşiktaş	2	(0)
2013	→ Boluspor (loan)	1	(0)
2014	→ Kahramanmaraşspor (loan)	7	(1)
2014–2015	→ Tepecikspor (loan)	28	(13)
2015–2016	→ Bayrampaşaspor (loan)	24	(8)
2016–2017	Pendikspor	27	(2)
2017–2018	Kırklarelispor	16	(9)
2018–2019	Hatayspor	27	(12)
2019–2020	Manisa	45	(18)
2020–2021	Çorum	35	(27)
2021–2022	Tarsus İdman Yurdu	16	(6)
2022	Şanlıurfaspor	17	(10)
2022	Sakaryaspor	0	(0)
2022–2024	Çorum	38	(17)
2024	Vanspor FK	17	(6)
2024–2025	Çorluspor	7	(2)
2025–	Şanlıurfaspor	36	(21)

International career
2013	Turkey U20	2	(0)
- * Club domestic league appearances and goals as of 1 October 2026

Sinan Kurumuş (born 2 August 1994) is a Turkish footballer who plays as a forward for TFF 2. Lig club Şanlıurfaspor.

== Club career ==
He made his Süper Lig debut for Ankaragücü on 18 February 2012.
