= Hasan Türk =

Turkish footballer

Personal information
- Full name: Hasan Türk
- Date of birth: 20 March 1993 (age 33)
- Place of birth: Gönen, Balıkesir, Turkey
- Height: 1.82 m (6 ft 0 in)
- Position: Midfielder

Team information
- Current team: Kemerspor 2003
- Number: 35

Youth career
- 2004–2006: Mahmutbeyspor
- 2006–2012: Beşiktaş A2

Senior career*
Years	Team	Apps	(Gls)
2012–2016	Beşiktaş	8	(0)
2013–2014	→ Göztepe (loan)	11	(1)
2014–2015	→ Kırklarelispor (loan)	27	(3)
2015–2016	→ Bayrampaşaspor (loan)	15	(1)
2016–2017	Üsküdar Anadolu	31	(3)
2017	Sivasspor	0	(0)
2017	Kırklarelispor	2	(0)
2018	Çanakkale Dardanelspor	14	(0)
2018–2019	BAKspor	24	(0)
2019	Erbaaspor	8	(0)
2020–	Kemerspor 2003	9	(0)

International career
2008	Turkey U15	9	(3)
2008–2009	Turkey U16	14	(2)
2009	Turkey U17	10	(2)
2012	Turkey U19	8	(1)
2012–2013	Turkey U20	6	(0)
- * Club domestic league appearances and goals as of 11 October 2020

Hasan Türk (born 20 March 1993 in Gönen, Turkey) is a Turkish footballer who plays as a midfielder or winger for Kemerspor 2003. A product of Beşiktaş A2, he was promoted to senior level in the beginning of the 2012-13 season.

Made 8 Süper Lig appearances at 2012–13 season, Türk was loaned out Göztepe S.K., Kırıkkalespor and, Bayrampaşaspor respectively for 2013–14, 2014–15 and 2015–16 seasons.

== Career ==
Started his career at Mahmutbeyspor, a local club in Bağcılar district in Istanbul, Türk joined Beşiktaş in 2006. He scored 11 goals in 74 games in youth level. He made his senior level league debut against İstanbul BB in week 1 of 2012-13 season, on 20 August 2012. Türk gained his spot in starting line-up of the team in 2012–13 Turkish Cup 2nd round encounter ended 2–1 for Beşiktaş, against Niğde Belediyespor, Regional Amateur League outfit.

Following being released by Beşiktaş 19 January 2016, he signed in Üsküdar Anadolu S.K., another Istanbul team. Pleased 5 games at the club, he was released on 28 June 2016.

== Statistics ==
(Correct as of 26 December 2015)

Club	Season	League		Cup		Europe		Total	
Club	Season	Apps	Goals	Apps	Goals	Apps	Goals	Apps	Goals
Beşiktaş	2012–13	8	0	2	0	0	0	10	0
Beşiktaş	Total	8	0	2	0	0	0	10	0
Göztepe (loan)	2013–14	11 (Note: 1 appearance in TFF Second League play-offs)	1	1	0	0	0	12	1
Göztepe (loan)	Total	11	1	1	0	0	0	12	1
Kırıkkalespor (loan)	2014–15	27	3	0	0	0	0	27	3
Kırıkkalespor (loan)	Total	27	3	0	0	0	0	27	3
Bayrampaşaspor (loan)	2015–16	15	1	1	0	0	0	16	1
Bayrampaşaspor (loan)	Total	15	1	1	0	0	0	16	1
Career total		61	5	4	0	0	0	65	5
