= Muhammed Demirci =

Turkish professional footballer

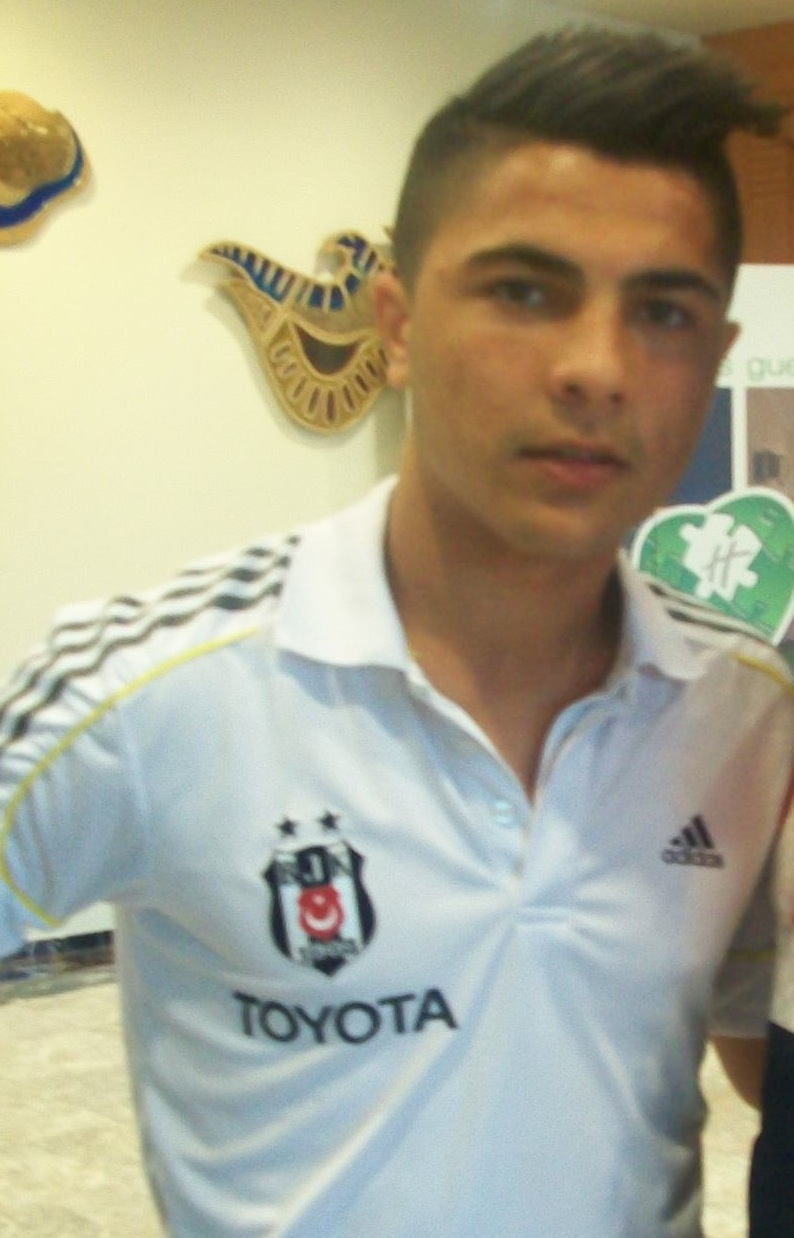

Personal information
- Date of birth: 3 January 1995 (age 31)
- Place of birth: Göynücek, Amasya, Turkey
- Height: 1.69 m (5 ft 7 in)
- Position: Midfielder

Team information
- Current team: Elazığspor
- Number: 80

Youth career
- 2006–2010: Beşiktaş

Senior career*
Years	Team	Apps	(Gls)
2010–2015	Beşiktaş	14	(0)
2014–2015	→ Gaziantep BB (loan)	9	(0)
2015–2017	Mouscron	0	(0)
2016	→ İstanbulspor (loan)	8	(1)
2016–2020	İstanbulspor	57	(7)
2020	→ 24 Erzincanspor (loan)	11	(3)
2020	Şanlıurfaspor	9	(0)
2020–2021	Sarıyer	8	(1)
2021–2022	24 Erzincanspor	34	(15)
2022–2023	Tuzlaspor	23	(0)
2023–2024	İskenderunspor	31	(4)
2024	Tuzlaspor	1	(0)
2024–2025	Balıkesirspor	29	(4)
2025–2026	Ankaraspor	35	(3)
2026–	Elazığspor	4	(0)

International career
2010	Turkey U15	4	(2)
2010–2011	Turkey U16	6	(3)
2011–2012	Turkey U17	6	(1)
2012–2013	Turkey U18	5	(0)
2013–2014	Turkey U19	9	(3)
2013–2015	Turkey U20	2	(0)
2014–2016	Turkey U21	5	(0)
- * Club domestic league appearances and goals as of 1 October 2026

Muhammed Demirci (born 3 January 1995) is a Turkish professional footballer who plays as a midfielder for TFF 2. Lig club Elazığspor.

He signed his first professional contract with Beşiktaş through the 2010–2011 season and played his first match against Gaziantep on 3 March 2011.

== Career ==
=== Beşiktaş JK ===
On 11 October 2010, Demirci signed a three-year professional contract with Beşiktaş.

Ibrahim Toraman said, "He is a very young and talented football player. We already know his talents. But Mami is weak. It is necessary that he gains strength to be able to play on a regular basis. Now, football is a game based on more power."

Necip Uysal added, "He must strengthen his muscles. To do this extra work, time and patience is needed." In the 2010–2011 season Muhammed opted for the number 80, also worn by Ronaldinho who wore the number while playing for Milan. He also chose the number 80 because when he made his Super Lig debut on 1 April 2012 against Samsunspor, he entered the pitch in the 80th minute as a substitute for Veli Kavlak. At the end of the match he said: "The first match got very excited to play. When the coach decided to use me made me happy. Despite the loss we played a good match. We had to take risks after we were behind. We are sorry for the defeat." He scored his first goal on 24 July 2012 against Jagiellonia Białystok in a preparation match that ended 1–1.

=== Mouscron ===
In August 2015, Demirci agreed with Belgian club Mouscron for four years.

== Career statistics ==
=== Professional career ===
Club	League	Season	League		Cup		Europe		Total	
Club	League	Season	Apps	Goals	Apps	Goals	Apps	Goals	Apps	Goals
Beşiktaş	Süper Lig	2010–11	1	0	1	0	0	0	2	0
Beşiktaş	Süper Lig	2011–12	1	0	0	0	0	0	1	0
Beşiktaş	Süper Lig	2012–13	4	0	1	0	0	0	5	0
Beşiktaş	Süper Lig	2013–14	9	0	1	0	1	0	11	0
Career total			15	0	3	0	1	0	19	0

=== Semi-pro career ===
Category	Beşiktaş
Category	Apps	Goals
Private tournaments and trophies	4	3
Special matches	9	3
European Championship	3	0
U16 Academy League	13	4
U15 Academy League Finals Turkey	5	1
U15 Academy League	12	9
A2 League	27	7
Total	73	27
