= 2010–11 Beşiktaş J.K. season =

Beşiktaş J.K.
2010–11 season
- President: Yıldırım Demirören
- Head coach: Tayfur Havutçu
- Stadium: BJK İnönü Stadium
- Süper Lig: 5th
- Turkish Cup: Winners (9th title)
- UEFA Europa League: Round of 32
- Top goalscorer: League: Bobô; Guti (7); Quaresma (17); All: Quaresma (17)
Home colours	Away colours	Third colours

The 2010–11 Beşiktaş J.K. season was the club's 53rd season in the Süper Lig and their 107th year in existence. They will play in the 2010–11 Süper Lig and the 2010–11 UEFA Europa League, starting in the second qualifying round.

== Current squad ==
This year Beşiktaş has one of its best squads in team history with the transfers of well known players, such as Ricardo Quaresma, Guti and Roberto Hilbert.

As of 22 July 2010.

Note: Flags indicate national team as defined under FIFA eligibility rules; some limited exceptions apply. Players may hold more than one non-FIFA nationality.

No.	Pos.	Nation	Player
1	GK	TUR	Rüştü Reçber
2	DF	TUR	Cumali Bişi
3	DF	TUR	İsmail Köybaşı
4	MF	POR	Manuel Fernandes
6	DF	CZE	Tomáš Sivok
7	FW	POR	Ricardo Quaresma
8	FW	TUR	Nihat Kahveci
9	MF	GER	Roberto Hilbert
11	FW	TUR	Mert Nobre
13	FW	BRA	Bobô
14	MF	ESP	Guti (captain)
17	MF	AUT	Ekrem Dağ
18	MF	TUR	Necip Uysal
20	DF	TUR	İbrahim Toraman
21	GK	TUR	Hakan Arıkan

No.	Pos.	Nation	Player
22	DF	TUR	Ersan Gülüm
26	MF	TUR	Onur Bayramoğlu
27	DF	ITA	Matteo Ferrari
28	MF	GER	Fabian Ernst
31	MF	POR	Simão (vice-captain)
34	FW	POR	Hugo Almeida
44	DF	TUR	Erhan Güven
55	MF	TUR	Mehmet Aurélio
66	DF	TUR	Doğukan Pala
77	DF	TUR	Rıdvan Şimşek
80	MF	TUR	Muhammed Demirci
90	GK	TUR	Umut Kaya
92	DF	TUR	Furkan Şeker
93	DF	TUR	Atınç Nukan
99	GK	TUR	Cenk Gönen

== Transfers ==
=== In ===
Transfer Window	Pos.	Name	From	Fee
Summer	MF	(Spain) Guti	(Spain) Real Madrid	Free
Summer	MF	(Portugal) Ricardo Quaresma	(Italy) Internazionale	€7,200,000
Summer	MF	(Germany) Roberto Hilbert	(Germany) VfB Stuttgart	Free
Summer	GK	(Turkey) Cenk Gönen	(Turkey) Denizlispor	€1,000,000
Summer	DF	(Turkey) Ersan Gülüm	(Turkey) Adanaspor	Loan
Summer	FW	(Turkey) Volkan Ekici	(Germany) Borussia Dortmund	Undisclosed
Summer	MF	(Turkey) Mehmet Aurélio	(Spain) Real Betis	Free
Summer	FW	(Turkey) Fatih Tekke	(Russia) Rubin Kazan	€750,000
Summer	MF	(Turkey) Kemal Akbaba	(Turkey) Hacettepespor	Free
Winter	MF	(Portugal) Simão	(Spain) Atlético Madrid	$900,000
Winter	MF	(Portugal) Manuel Fernandes	(Spain) Valencia	Loan
Winter	FW	(Portugal) Hugo Almeida	(Germany) Werder Bremen	$2,000,000
Winter	MF	(Turkey) Kerim Alıcı	(Turkey) Balıkesirspor	Free
Winter	DF	(Turkey) Güven Gürsoy	(Turkey) Malatyaspor	€20,000

=== Out ===
Transfer Window	Pos.	Name	To	Fee
Summer	MF	(Turkey) Serdar Özkan	(Turkey) Galatasaray	Free
Summer	FW	(Turkey) Batuhan Karadeniz	(Turkey) Eskişehirspor	€2,100,000
Summer	FW	(Turkey) Kenan Özer	(Turkey) Antalyaspor	Free
Summer	DF	(Croatia) Gordon Schildenfeld	(Austria) Sturm Graz	€300,000
Summer	MF	(Turkey) Erkan Zengin	(Turkey) Eskişehirspor	Undisclosed
Summer	MF	(Turkey) Uğur İnceman	(Turkey) Antalyaspor	Free
Summer	DF	(Turkey) Mehmet Sedef	(Turkey) Konyaspor	Free
Summer	MF	(Turkey) Soner Ergençay	(Turkey) Balıkesirspor	Loan
Summer	DF	(Turkey) Emre Özkan	(Turkey) Orduspor	Loan
Summer	MF	(Turkey) Abdullah Eryılmaz	(Turkey) Gümüşhanespor	Loan
Summer	MF	(Turkey) Metin Erdem	(Turkey) Fener Köyü	Free
Summer	MF	(Turkey) Orhan Gülle	(Turkey) Gaziantepspor	Free
Summer	MF	(Turkey) Can Gümrükçü	(Turkey) Göztepe	Free
Summer	FW	(Turkey) Can Erdem	(Turkey) Denizlispor	Free
Summer	MF	(Chile) Rodrigo Tello	(Turkey) Eskişehirspor	Free
Summer	MF	(Argentina) Matías Delgado	(United Arab Emirates) Al-Jazira	Free
Summer	FW	(Turkey) Ömer Karancı	(Turkey) Adanaspor	Free
Summer	DF	(Turkey) Bülent Uzun	(Turkey) Eyüpspor	Free
Summer	FW	(Turkey) Emre İncemollaoğlu	(Turkey) Samsunspor	Loan
Summer	DF	(Turkey) Sezer Özmen	(Turkey) Çaykur Rizespor	Loan
Summer	FW	(Turkey) Gökhan Aydaş	(Turkey) Bugsaşspor	Loan
Summer	MF	(Turkey) Erkan Kaş	(Turkey) Çaykur Rizespor	Loan
Summer	DF	(Turkey) Gökhan Çalışır	(Turkey) Bugsaşspor	Loan
Summer	DF	(Turkey) Ethem Yılmaz	(Turkey) Gaziosmanpaşa	Loan
Summer	GK	(Turkey) Korcan Çelikay	(Turkey) Diyarbakırspor	Loan
Summer	MF	(Turkey) Burak Tahir Ateş	(Turkey) Gaziosmanpaşa	Loan
Summer	FW	(Turkey) Erkam Reşmen	(Turkey) G.Antep B.B.	Loan
Summer	DF	(Turkey) Erdem Özkurt	(Turkey) Gaziosmanpaşa	Loan
Summer	DF	(Turkey) Serkan Çelik	(Turkey) Menemen Bld.	Loan
Summer	DF	(Turkey) Özgür Özkaya	(Turkey) Beylerbeyi	Loan
Winter	DF	(Czech Republic) Tomáš Zápotočný	(Czech Republic) Sparta Prague	Free
Winter	FW	(Slovakia) Filip Hološko	(Turkey) İstanbul B.B.	Loan
Winter	MF	(Turkey) Samet Bülbül	(Turkey) Bucaspor	Loan
Winter	FW	(Turkey) Fatih Tekke	(Turkey) Ankaragücü	Undisclosed
Winter	GK	(Turkey) Korcan Çelikay	(Turkey) Sivasspor	Loan
Winter	DF	(Turkey) Serkan Çelik	(Turkey) 72Batmanspor	Loan
Winter	MF	(Turkey) Yusuf Şimşek	(Turkey) Kayseri Erciyesspor	Free
Winter	MF	(Brazil) Rodrigo Tabata	(Qatar) Al-Rayyan	€4,000,000
Winter	MF	(Germany) Michael Fink	(Germany) Borussia Mönchengladbach	€750,000
Winter	GK	(Turkey) Rasim Mutlu	(Turkey) Kırşehirspor	Loan
Winter	FW	(Turkey) Emre İncemollaoğlu	(Turkey) Balıkesirspor	Loan
Winter	FW	(Turkey) Ali Kucik	(Turkey) Bucaspor	Loan
Winter	FW	(Turkey) Nail Tilbaç	(Turkey) Gebzespor	Free
Winter	MF	(Turkey) Rıza Şen	(Turkey) Körfez Spor	Free
Winter	MF	(Turkey) Burak Tahir Ateş	(Turkey) Fener Köyü	Free
Winter	DF	(Turkey) İbrahim Üzülmez	Free Transfer	Free

== Friendlies ==
July 2, 2010	Beşiktaş	1–1	Neftchi Baku	Bischofshofen, Austria
	Erhan 83'	Report	Bakhshiev 22'	Stadium: BSK Bischofshofen; Referee: Alexandru Tudor

July 6, 2010	Beşiktaş	2–2	SV Grödig	Salzburg, Austria
	Bobô 23', 43'	Report	Kaltenhauser 9'; Jukić 73'	Stadium: Untersberg Arena; Referee: Heinz Vittzkotter

August 8, 2010	Villarreal	2–2 (6–5 p)	Beşiktaş	Villarreal, Spain
	Cani 76'; Altidore 80'		Bobô 31'; Quaresma 40'	Stadium: Estadio El Madrigal
	Penalties
	Soriano (penalty scored); Senna (penalty scored); Capdevila (penalty scored); Catalá (penalty scored); Altidore (penalty scored); Musacchio (penalty scored)		(penalty scored) Hološko; (penalty scored) İnceman; (penalty scored) Tabata; (penalty scored) Uysal; (penalty scored) Nobre; (penalty missed) Dağ

== Süper Lig ==
Beşiktaş participated in the 53rd season of the Süper Lig.

=== League table ===
Pos	Team	Pld	W	D	L	GF	GA	GD	Pts	Qualification or relegation
3	Bursaspor	34	17	10	7	50	29	+21	61	Qualification to Europa League third qualifying round
4	Gaziantepspor	34	17	8	9	44	33	+11	59	Qualification to Europa League second qualifying round
5	Beşiktaş	34	15	9	10	53	36	+17	54	Qualification to Europa League play-off round (Note: Beşiktaş have won the 2010–11 Turkish Cup competition and thus are qualified for the play-off round of the UEFA Europa League.)
6	Kayserispor	34	14	9	11	46	44	+2	51	
7	Eskişehirspor	34	12	11	11	41	40	+1	47	

Source: tff.org (in Turkish)
Rules for classification: 1) points; 2) goal difference; 3) number of goals scored.

=== Results by round ===
Round	1	2	3	4	5	6	7	8	9	10	11	12	13	14	15	16	17	18	19	20	21	22	23	24	25	26	27	28	29	30	31	32	33	34
Result	W	L	W	W	D	W	L	L	L	W	D	W	D	W	W	L	D	W	L	D	L	L	W											
Position	7	10	5	4	3	2	5	7	7	6	8	6	6	5	5	5	5	5	5	5	6	6	6											

Updated to match(es) played on 15 October 2010. Source: Competitive Matches
W = Win; D = Draw; L = Loss

=== Team record ===
Team	Home	Away	Aggregate
Ankaragücü	4–0	0–1	4–1
Antalyaspor	2–1	2–0	4–1
Bucaspor	5–1	1–0	6–1
Bursaspor	1–0		1–0
Eskişehirspor		0–2	0–2
Fenerbahçe	2–4	1–1	3–5
Galatasaray		2–1	2–1
Gaziantepspor	1–1		1–1
Gençlerbirliğ		2–0	2–0
İstanbul BB	0–2	1–2	1–4
Konyaspor	2–2		2–2
Karabükspor	1–1	4–1	5–2
Kasımpaşa	1–1		1–1
Kayserispor		0–1	0–1
Manisaspor	2–3		2–3
Sivasspor	2–1		2–1
Trabzonspor		0–1	0–1

=== Matches ===
14 August 2010 1	Bucaspor	0–1	Beşiktaş	İzmir
22:00 EET		Report	Bobô 45'	Stadium: İzmir Atatürk Stadium; Referee: Barış Şimşek

21 August 2010 2	Beşiktaş	0–2	İstanbul BB	Istanbul
21:00 EET		Report	Alın 57'; Akın 90'	Stadium: BJK İnönü Stadium; Referee: Fırat Aydınus

29 August 2010 3	Karabükspor	1–4	Beşiktaş	Karabük
	Emenike 7'	Report	Nobre 10', 26'; Guti 75' (pen.); Quaresma 82'	Stadium: Yenişehir Stadium; Referee: Tolga Özkalfa

11 September 2010 4	Beşiktaş	4–0	Ankaragücü	Istanbul
	Bobô 29', 67'; Toraman 61'; Nobre 75'	Report		Stadium: BJK İnönü Stadium

19 September 2010 5	Fenerbahçe	1–1	Beşiktaş	Istanbul
	Niang 26'	Report	Guti 86' (pen.)	Stadium: Şükrü Saracoğlu Stadium; Referee: Cüneyt Çakır

26 September 2010 6	Beşiktaş	2–1	Antalyaspor	Antalya
	Bobô 55', 90+1'	Report	Tita 67'	Stadium: Antalya Atatürk Stadium; Referee: Özgür Yankaya

3 October 2010 7	Trabzonspor	1–0	Beşiktaş	Trabzon
	Yumlu 51'	Report		Stadium: Hüseyin Avni Aker Stadium; Referee: Kuddusi Müftüoğlu

16 October 2010 8	Beşiktaş	2–3	Manisaspor	Istanbul
	Bobô 14'; Ernst 90'	Report	Promise 7'; Dixon 52'; Gökoğlan 69'	Stadium: BJK İnönü Stadium; Referee: Barış Şimşek

25 October 2010 9	Kayserispor	1–0	Beşiktaş	Kayseri
	Özçal 89'	Report		Stadium: Kayseri Kadir Has Stadium; Referee: Mustafa Kamil Abitoğlu

31 October 2010 10	Beşiktaş	2–1	Sivasspor	Istanbul
	Bobô 6'; Uysal 22'	Report	Pedriel 67'	Stadium: BJK İnönü Stadium; Referee: Tolga Özkalfa

7 November 2010 11	Beşiktaş	1–1	Kasımpaşa	Istanbul
	Köybaşı 85'	Report	Martin 76'	Stadium: BJK İnönü Stadium; Referee: Bülent Yıldırım

14 November 2010 12	Gençlerbirliği	0–2	Beşiktaş	Ankara
		Report	Guti 44' (pen.); Hilbert 89'	Stadium: Ankara 19 Mayıs Stadium; Referee: Abdullah Yılmaz

21 November 2010 13	Beşiktaş	2–2	Konyaspor	Konya
	Kéré 26' (o.g.); Hološko 39'	Report	Grajciar 16', 62'	Stadium: Konya Atatürk Stadium; Referee: Halis Özkahya

28 November 2010 14	Galatasaray	1–2	Beşiktaş	Istanbul
	Kewell 89'	Report	Guti 8' (pen.); Nobre 89'	Stadium: Ali Sami Yen Stadium; Referee: Cüneyt Çakır

5 December 2010 15	Beşiktaş	1–0	Bursaspor	Istanbul
	Hološko 65'	Report		Stadium: BJK İnönü Stadium; Referee: Fırat Aydınus

12 December 2010 16	Eskişehirspor	2–0	Beşiktaş	Eskişehir
	Sarı 61'; Öztürk 78'	Report		Stadium: Eskişehir Atatürk Stadium; Referee: Bünyamin Gezer

19 December 2010 17	Beşiktaş	1–1	Gaziantepspor	Istanbul
	Kuçik 65'	Report	Adın 59'	Stadium: BJK İnönü Stadium; Referee: Halis Özkahya

21 January 2011 18	Beşiktaş	5–1	Bucaspor	Istanbul
	Nobre 8', 64'; Guti 19' (pen.), 73'; Simão 44'	Report	Aydın 75'	Stadium: BJK İnönü Stadium; Referee: Yunus Yıldırım

30 January 2011 19	İstanbul BB	2–1	Beşiktaş	Istanbul
	Marcus Vinícius 35'; Alın 89'	Report	Simão 66'	Stadium: Atatürk Olympic Stadium; Referee: Fırat Aydınus

5 February 2011 20	Beşiktaş	1–1	Karabükspor	Istanbul
	Deumi 59' (o.g.)	Report	Emenike 55'	Stadium: BJK İnönü Stadium

13 February 2011 21	Ankaragücü	1–0	Beşiktaş	Ankara
	Özkan 1'	Report		Stadium: Ankara 19 Mayıs Stadium

20 February 2011 22	Beşiktaş	2–4	Fenerbahçe	Istanbul
	Dağ 43'; Toraman 50'	Report	Uysal 4' (o.g.); Alex 65' (pen.), 72', 75'	Stadium: BJK İnönü Stadium

28 February 2011 23	Antalyaspor	0–2	Beşiktaş	Antalya
		Report	Dağ 56'; Guti 79'	Stadium: Antalya Atatürk Stadium

6 March 2011 24	Beşiktaş	1–2	Trabzonspor	Istanbul
	Bobô 66'	Report	Gülselam 68'; B. Yılmaz 88'	Stadium: BJK İnönü Stadium

11 March 2011 25	Manisaspor	0–0	Beşiktaş	Manisa
		Report		Stadium: Manisa 19 Mayıs Stadium

19 March 2011 26	Beşiktaş	4–2	Kayserispor	Istanbul
	Almeida 61', 89'; Ernst 69'; Quaresma 76'	Report	Zalayeta 22'; Teber 81' (pen.)	Stadium: BJK İnönü Stadium

2 April 2011 27	Sivasspor	1–0	Beşiktaş	Sivas
	C. Yılmaz 90'	Report		Stadium: Sivas 4 Eylül Stadium

11 April 2011 28	Kasımpaşa	0–1	Beşiktaş	Istanbul
		Report	Almeida 43'	Stadium: Recep Tayyip Erdoğan Stadium

15 April 2011 29	Beşiktaş	2–2	Gençlerbirliği	Istanbul
	Simão 27'; Toraman 53'	Report	Jedinak 62'; Pektemek 72'	Stadium: BJK İnönü Stadium

25 April 2011 30	Konyaspor	1–1	Beşiktaş	Konya
	Robak 31'	Report	Quaresma 76' (pen.)	Stadium: Konya Atatürk Stadium

30 April 2011 31	Beşiktaş	2–0	Galatasaray	Istanbul
	Aurélio 59'; Simão 61'	Report		Stadium: BJK İnönü Stadium

5 May 2011 32	Bursaspor	0–3	Beşiktaş	Bursa
20:00		Report		Stadium: Bursa Atatürk Stadium

16 May 2011 33	Beşiktaş	3–1	Eskişehirspor	Istanbul
	Fernandes 37'; Almeida 58'; Simão 87' (pen.)	Report	Zengin 26'	Stadium: BJK İnönü Stadium

21 May 2011 34	Gaziantepspor	0–0	Beşiktaş	Gaziantep
		Report		Stadium: Gaziantep Kamil Ocak Stadium

== Turkish Cup ==
Beşiktaş participated in the 49th season of the Turkish Cup. In the playoff round, Beşiktaş defeated Mersin İdman Yurdu 3–0 in extra time to secure a berth in the group stage.

=== Playoff round ===
28 October 2010	Beşiktaş	3–0 (a.e.t.)	Mersin İdman Yurdu	Istanbul
	Guti 100'; Bobô 102', 112'	Report		Stadium: BJK İnönü Stadium; Referee: Aytekin Durmaz

=== Group stage ===
Pos	Team	Pld	W	D	L	GF	GA	GD	Pts
1	Beşiktaş	4	3	0	1	8	6	+2	9
2	Gaziantep B.B.	4	2	2	0	7	5	+2	8
3	Trabzonspor	4	2	1	1	9	6	+3	7
4	Konya Torku Şekerspor	4	1	1	2	7	9	−2	4
5	Manisaspor	4	0	0	4	5	10	−5	0

Source: tff.org (in Turkish)
Rules for classification: 1) points; 2) goal difference; 3) number of goals scored.

11 November 2010 1	Gaziantep BŞB	1–0	Beşiktaş	Gaziantep
	Özen 26'	Report		Stadium: Kamil Ocak Stadium; Referee: İlker Meral

22 December 2010 2	Beşiktaş	3–2	Konya Torku Şekerspor	Antalya
	Aurélio 10'; Guti 44'; Fink 60'	Report	Köybaşı 74' (o.g.); Akyel 82'	Stadium: Mardan Stadium

12 January 2011 3	Manisaspor	2–3	Beşiktaş	Manisa
	Simpson 19'; Barış 78'	Report	Sivok 34'; Nobre 37'; Guti 82'	Stadium: Manisa 19 Mayıs Stadium

26 January 2011 4	Beşiktaş	2–1	Trabzonspor	Istanbul
	Almeida 11'; Quaresma 30'	Report	Alanzinho 46'	Stadium: BJK İnönü Stadium

=== Quarter-finals ===
2 February 2011 First leg	Beşiktaş	5–0	Gaziantep BŞB	Istanbul
	Bobô 23', 50' (pen.); Fernandes 31', 48'; Quaresma 62'			Stadium: BJK İnönü Stadium

2 March 2011 Second leg	Gaziantep BŞB	0–3	Beşiktaş	Gaziantep
			Nobre 11'; Hilbert 75'; Almeida 89'	Stadium: Kamil Ocak Stadium

Beşiktaş won 8–0 on aggregate

=== Semi-finals ===
6 April 2011 First leg	Beşiktaş	3–0	Gaziantepspor	Istanbul
				Stadium: BJK İnönü Stadium

20 April 2011 Second leg	Gaziantepspor	2–2	Beşiktaş	Gaziantep
				Stadium: Kamil Ocak Stadium

Beşiktaş won 5–2 on aggregate

=== Final ===
11 May 2011	Beşiktaş	2–2 (a.e.t.) (4–3 p)	İstanbul BB	Kayseri
				Stadium: Kayseri Kadir Has Stadium

== UEFA Europa League ==
Beşiktaş qualified for the UEFA Europa League after finishing fourth in the Süper Lig in the 2009–10 season. They began the competition in the second qualifying round.

=== Second qualifying round ===
15 July 2010 First leg	Beşiktaş (Turkey)	3–0	(Faroe Islands) Víkingur	Istanbul, Turkey
	Kahveci 19', 65'; Nobre 90'	Report		Stadium: BJK İnönü Stadium; Attendance: 16,803; Referee: Igor Egorov (Russia)

22 July 2010 Second leg	Víkingur (Faroe Islands)	0–4	(Turkey) Beşiktaş	Toftir, Faroe Islands
			Dağ 3'; Kahveci 10'; Bobô 32', 44'	Stadium: Svangaskarð; Attendance: 651; Referee: Mattias Gestranius (Finland)

Beşiktaş won 7–0 on aggregate

=== Third qualifying round ===
29 July 2010 First leg	Viktoria Plzeň (Czech Republic)	1–1	(Turkey) Beşiktaş	Plzeň, Czech Republic
	Limberský 28'		Delgado 45' (pen.)	Stadium: Štruncovy Sady Stadion; Referee: Carlos Clos Gómez (Spain)

5 August 2010 Second leg	Beşiktaş (Turkey)	3–0	(Czech Republic) Viktoria Plzeň	Istanbul, Turkey
	Quaresma 38'; Delgado 56'; Hološko 71'			Stadium: BJK İnönü Stadium; Attendance: 25,975; Referee: Jérome Efong Nzolo (Belgium)

Beşiktaş won 4–1 on aggregate.

=== Playoff round ===
17 August 2010 First leg	Beşiktaş (Turkey)	2–0	(Finland) HJK	Istanbul, Turkey
19:00 EET	Hilbert 34'; Quaresma 64'			Stadium: BJK İnönü Stadium; Referee: Ovidiu Alin Hațegan (Romania)

26 August 2010 Second leg	HJK (Finland)	0–4	(Turkey) Beşiktaş	Helsinki, Finland
19:45 EET			Quaresma 13'; Guti 66'; Uysal 76'; Hološko 90+2'	Stadium: Finnair Stadium; Referee: Peter Rasmussen (Denmark)

Beşiktaş won 6–0 on aggregate.

=== Group stage ===
In the seeding, Beşiktaş were placed in Pot 2. Their opponents in the group stage of the competition were FC Porto of Portugal, CSKA Sofia of Bulgaria and Rapid Wien of Austria. Beşiktaş finished second with 13 points — after Porto with 16 points — to secure a berth in the Round of 32.

Pos	Team	Pld	W	D	L	GF	GA	GD	Pts	Qualification
1	(Portugal) Porto	6	5	1	0	14	4	+10	16	Advance to knockout phase
2	(Turkey) Beşiktaş	6	4	1	1	9	6	+3	13	Advance to knockout phase
3	(Austria) Rapid Wien	6	1	0	5	5	12	−7	3	
4	(Bulgaria) CSKA Sofia	6	1	0	5	4	10	−6	3	

Source: Soccerway

16 September 2010 1	Beşiktaş (Turkey)	1–0	(Bulgaria) CSKA Sofia	Istanbul, Turkey
	Ernst 89'			Stadium: BJK İnönü Stadium; Attendance: 25,035; Referee: Laurent Duhamel (France)

30 September 2010 2	Rapid Wien (Austria)	1–2	(Turkey) Beşiktaş	Hütteldorf, Austria
	Kavlak 51'		Hološko 55'; Bobô 64'	Stadium: Gerhard Hanappi Stadium; Attendance: 47,200; Referee: Aleksei Kulbakov (Belarus)

21 October 2010 3	Beşiktaş (Turkey)	1–3	(Portugal) Porto	Istanbul, Turkey
	Bobô 90+2'		Falcao 26'; Hulk 59', 78'	Stadium: BJK İnönü Stadium; Attendance: 21,722; Referee: Carlos Clos Gómez (Spain)

4 November 2010 4	Porto (Portugal)	1–1	(Turkey) Beşiktaş	Porto, Portugal
	Falcao 36' (pen.)		Kahveci 62'	Stadium: Estádio do Dragão; Attendance: 24,139; Referee: Paolo Tagliavento (Italy)

2 December 2010	CSKA Sofia (Bulgaria)	1–2	(Turkey) Beşiktaş	Sofia, Bulgaria
	Sheridan 79'		Zápotočný 59'; Hološko 64'	Stadium: Vasil Levski National Stadium; Attendance: 10,000; Referee: Tom Harald Hagen (Norway)

15 December 2010 5	Beşiktaş (Turkey)	2–0	(Austria) Rapid Wien	Istanbul, Turkey
	Quaresma 32'; Ernst 45'			Stadium: BJK İnönü Stadium; Attendance: 16,696; Referee: Peter Rasmussen (Denmark)

=== Round of 32 ===
In the round of 32, Beşiktaş was matched with Dynamo Kyiv of Ukraine.

17 February 2011 First leg	Beşiktaş (Turkey)	1–4	(Ukraine) Dynamo Kyiv	Istanbul, Turkey
	Quaresma 37'		Vukojević 26'; Shevchenko 50'; Yussuf 56'; Husyev 90' (pen.)	Stadium: BJK İnönü Stadium

24 February 2011 Second leg	Dynamo Kyiv (Ukraine)	4–0	(Turkey) Beşiktaş	Kyiv, Ukraine
	Vukojević 2'; Yarmolenko 55'; Husyev 64'; Shevchenko 74'			Stadium: Lobanovsky Dynamo Stadium
