= 2011–12 Beşiktaş J.K. season =

Beşiktas
2011–12 season
- President: Yıldırım Demirören
- Head coach: Carlos Carvalhal
- Stadium: BJK İnönü Stadium
- Süper Lig: 4th
- Turkish Cup: Fourth round
- UEFA Europa League: Round of 16
- Top goalscorer: League: Hugo Almeida (10); All: Hugo Almeida (14)
Home colours	Away colours	Third colours

The 2011–12 Beşiktaş J.K. season was the club's 108th year of existence and their 54th consecutive year in the Süper Lig. Beşiktaş were the defending champions of the Turkish Cup and participated in the group stage. The team also competed in the UEFA Europa League for a second consecutive year after being eliminated by Dynamo Kyiv in the round of 32 the previous year.

== Match results ==
=== Legend ===
Win	Draw	Loss

=== Pre-season friendlies ===
12 July 2011	Austria Salzburg	1–3	Beşiktaş	Zell am See, Austria
	Dusan 4'	Report	Toraman 5'; Hološko 52'; Bébé 57'	Stadium: Zell am See Stadium

14 July 2011	Pinzgau Saalfelden	0–8	Beşiktaş	Leogang, Austria
		Report	Hološko 3'; Sidnei 33'; Simão 40'; Ernst 44'; Kaplan 65'; Quaresma 74', 90'; Almeida 74'	Stadium: Leogang Stadium; Referee: Reintard Fuckshuber (Austria)

21 July 2011	Atlético Madrid	0–1	Beşiktaş	Granada, Spain
		Report	Ernst 28'	Stadium: Estadio Nuevo Los Cármenes; Referee: Raúl Chávez García (Spain)

2 July 2011	Granada	0–0 (3–2 p)	Beşiktaş	Granada, Spain
	Filipe Luís (penalty scored); Benítez (penalty scored); M. Rico (penalty missed); Calvo (penalty scored)	Report	(penalty scored) Almeida; (penalty scored) Fernandes; (penalty missed) Hološko; (penalty missed) Kavlak	Stadium: Estadio Nuevo Los Carmenes; Referee: Raúl Chávez García (Spain)

5 August 2011	Ergotelis	1–2	Beşiktaş	Köln, Germany
	Karelis 73'	[ Report]	Sivok 42'; Aurélio 46'	Stadium: Süd Station Köln; Referee: Christian Bondoretti (Germany)

August 7, 2011	Oțelul Galați	1–1	Beşiktaş	Rijswijk, Netherlands
	Iorga 38'	Report	Almeida 27'	Stadium: Sportpark Irene; Referee: Wim Bronsvoort (Netherlands)

9 August 2011	Uerdingen 05	1–5	Beşiktaş	Krefeld, Germany
	Kremer 17'	Report	Guti 27'; Simão 40'; Quaresma 50', 87'; Kavlak 88'	Stadium: Grotenburg-Stadion; Referee: Sven Waschitzki (Germany)

29 August 2011	Beşiktaş	3–0	Sarıyer	Istanbul, Turkey
	Kavlak 42'; Quaresma 55' (pen.), 57'	Report		Stadium: BJK Nevzat Demir Facility; Referee: Mete Kalkavan (Turkey)

September 3, 2011	Beşiktaş	0–0	Kartalspor	Istanbul, Turkey
		Report		Stadium: BJK Nevzat Demir Facility

=== Süper Lig ===
==== Standings ====
Pos	Team	Pld	W	D	L	GF	GA	GD	Pts	Qualification or relegation
2	Fenerbahçe	34	20	8	6	61	34	+27	68	Qualification to Süper Final, Championship group
3	Trabzonspor	34	15	11	8	60	39	+21	56	Qualification to Süper Final, Championship group
4	Beşiktaş	34	15	10	9	50	39	+11	55	Qualification to Süper Final, Championship group
5	Eskişehirspor	34	14	8	12	42	41	+1	50 (Note: Eskişehirspor were ahead of İstanbul B.B. and Sivasspor on head-to-head points: Eskişehirspor: 8 pts, İstanbul B.B.: 5 pts, Sivasspor: 2 pts.)	Qualification to Süper Final, Europa League group
6	İstanbul B.B.	34	14	8	12	48	49	−1	50	Qualification to Süper Final, Europa League group

Source: TFF's official Süper Lig website
Rules for classification: 1) points; 2) goal difference; 3) number of goals scored.

==== Matches ====
10 September 2011 1	Eskişehirspor	2–1	Beşiktaş	Eskişehir
	Diego Ângelo 24'; Karadeniz 83'	Report	Almeida 45'	Stadium: Eskişehir Atatürk Stadium

19 September 2011 2	Beşiktaş	3–1	Ankaragücü	Istanbul
	Sidnei 37', 81'; Pektemek 89'	Report	Tisdell 53'	Stadium: BJK İnönü Stadium

22 September 2011 3	Bursaspor	1–2	Beşiktaş	Bursa
	Bangura 6'	Report	Sivok 87'; Hološko 90'	Stadium: Bursa Atatürk Stadium

25 September 2011 4	Beşiktaş	1–0	Antalyaspor	Istanbul
	Simão 80' (pen.)	Report		Stadium: BJK İnönü Stadium

3 October 2011 5	Gaziantepspor	0–0	Beşiktaş	Gaziantep
		Report		Stadium: Gaziantep Kamil Ocak Stadium

15 October 2011 6	Beşiktaş	0–2	Kayserispor	Istanbul
		Report	Özçal 65'; Troisi 81'	Stadium: BJK İnönü Stadium

24 October 2011 7	Mersin İdman Yurdu	0–1	Beşiktaş	Mersin
		Report	Pektemek 19'	Stadium: Tevfik Sırrı Gür Stadium

27 October 2011 8	Beşiktaş	2–2	Fenerbahçe	Istanbul
	Simão 12'; Almeida 72'	Report	Alex 60'; Cristian 88'	Stadium: BJK İnönü Stadium

30 October 2011 9	Beşiktaş	3–1	Sivasspor	Istanbul
	Hilbert 12'; Simão 78' (pen.); Hološko 90+3'	Report	Grosicki 59'	Stadium: BJK İnönü Stadium

6 November 2011 10	Gençlerbirliği	4–2	Beşiktaş	Ankara
	Tum 54'; Meriç 56'; Korkmaz 77' (o.g.); Kılıçaslan 90'	Report	Ernst 4'; Pektemek 24'	Stadium: Ankara 19 Mayıs Stadium

20 November 2011 11	Beşiktaş	0–0	Galatasaray	Istanbul
		Report		Stadium: BJK İnönü Stadium

27 November 2011 12	Trabzonspor	0–1	Beşiktaş	Trabzon
		Report	Quaresma 78' (pen.)	Stadium: Hüseyin Avni Aker Stadium

5 December 2011 13	Beşiktaş	2–1	Orduspor	Istanbul
	Kevlak 37'; Ernst 72'	Report	Culio 66'	Stadium: BJK İnönü Stadium

8 December 2011 14	Manisaspor	1–4	Beşiktaş	Manisa
	Erdoğan 56'	Report	Quaresma 32'; Pektemek 44'; Sivok 52'; Fernandes 79'	Stadium: Manisa 19 Mayıs Stadium

11 December 2011 15	Beşiktaş	1–1	İstanbul B.B.	Istanbul
	Pektemek 71'	Report	Köse 87'	Stadium: BJK İnönü Stadium

18 December 2011 16	Samsunspor	1–1	Beşiktaş	Samsun
	Yıldırım 37'	Report	Edu 78' (pen.)	Stadium: Samsun 19 Mayıs Stadium

22 December 2011 17	Beşiktaş	1–0	Karabükspor	Istanbul
	Almeida 37'	Report		Stadium: BJK İnönü Stadium

4 January 2012 18	Beşiktaş	2–0	Eskişehirspor	Istanbul
	Sivok 54'; Pektemek 90'	Report		Stadium: BJK İnönü Stadium

8 January 2012 19	Ankaragücü	0–0	Beşiktaş	Ankara
		Report		Stadium: Ankara 19 Mayıs Stadium

15 January 2012 20	Beşiktaş	3–1	Bursaspor	Istanbul
	Almeida 7'; Edu 38'; Pektemek 83'	Report	Batalla 36'	Stadium: BJK İnönü Stadium

20 January 2012 21	Antalyaspor	1–2	Beşiktaş	Antalya
	Tita 90+4' (pen.)	Report	Almeida 64'; Fernandes 90'	Stadium: Mardan Sports Complex

24 January 2012 22	Beşiktaş	3–2	Gaziantepspor	Istanbul
	Almeida 47', 85'; Korkmaz 90+5'	Report	Süme 54'; Sosa 67'	Stadium: BJK İnönü Stadium

30 January 2012 23	Kayserispor	1–0	Beşiktaş	Kayseri
	Troisi 1'	Report		Stadium: Kadir Has Stadium

2 February 2012 24	Beşiktaş	0–1	Mersin İdman Yurdu	Istanbul
		Report	Kılıçaslan 44'	Stadium: BJK İnönü Stadium

5 February 2012 25	Fenerbahçe	2–0	Beşiktaş	Istanbul
	Yobo 14'; Sow 90+1'	Report		Stadium: Şükrü Saracoğlu Stadium

9 February 2012 26	Sivasspor	1–1	Beşiktaş	Sivas
	Kılıç 85'	Report	Sivok 43'	Stadium: Sivas 4 Eylül Stadium

19 February 2012 27	Beşiktaş	3–2	Gençlerbirliği	Istanbul
	Quaresma 49'; Almeida 57'; Fernandes 73'	Report	Tum 23'; Azofeifa 70'	Stadium: BJK İnönü Stadium

26 February 2012 28	Galatasaray	3–2	Beşiktaş	Istanbul
	Elmander 15', 90'; Melo 52'	Report	Toraman 49'; Kaya 73' (o.g.)	Stadium: Türk Telekom Arena

4 March 2012 29	Beşiktaş	1–2	Trabzonspor	Istanbul
	Almeida 50'	Report	Yılmaz 62'; Colman 78'	Stadium: BJK İnönü Stadium

11 March 2012 30	Orduspor	1–1	Beşiktaş	Ordu
	Stancu 45'	Report	Edu 71'	Stadium: 19 Eylul Stadium

19 March 2012 31	Beşiktaş	4–1	Manisaspor	Istanbul
	Almeida 18'; Quaresma 60', 65'; Fernandes 90'	Report	Çökmüş 90+6'	Stadium: BJK İnönü Stadium

26 March 2012 32	İstanbul B.B.	2–2	Beşiktaş	Istanbul
	İnanç 6'; Višća 70'	Report	Fernandes 36'; Pektemek 49'	Stadium: Atatürk Olympic Stadium

1 April 2012 33	Beşiktaş	0–1	Samsunspor	Istanbul
		Report	Yıldırım 70'	Stadium: BJK İnönü Stadium

6 April 2012 34	Karabükspor	1–1	Beşiktaş	Karabük
	Yıldız 24'	Report	Hološko 17'	Stadium: Yenişehir Stadium

==== European play-offs ====
===== Championship group =====
Pos	Team	Pld	W	D	L	GF	GA	GD	Pts	Qualification	GAL	FEN	TRA	BEŞ
1	Galatasaray (C)	6	2	3	1	9	6	+3	48	Qualification to Champions League group stage		1–2	0–0	2–2
2	Fenerbahçe	6	4	1	1	9	4	+5	47	Qualification to Champions League third qualifying round	0–0		2–0	2–1
3	Trabzonspor	6	1	2	3	5	10	−5	33	Qualification to Europa League play-off round (Note: Trabzonspor entered the play-off round as Fenerbahçe, the winners of the 2011–12 Turkish Cup, already qualified for the Champions League. Moreover, as Beşiktaş is banned 1 year from European football, Europa League spots shifted down, so Bursaspor start from the third qualifying round, as well as Eskişehirspor start from the second qualifying round.)	2–4	1–3		1–0
4	Beşiktaş	6	1	2	3	5	8	−3	33	Banned from 2012–13 European competitions (Note: See 2012–13 UEFA Europa League qualification play-off match. Moreover, as Beşiktaş is banned 1 year from European football, Europa League spots shifted down.)	0–2	1–0	1–1	

Source: SporToto Süper Lig official website
Legend: Blue = home team win; Yellow = draw; Red = away team win.
Rules for classification: 1) points; 2) goal difference; 3) number of goals scored.
(C) Champions
Notes:

16 April 2012 1	Beşiktaş	0–2	Galatasaray	Istanbul
		Report	Melo 26'; Yılmaz 79'	Stadium: BJK İnönü Stadium; Attendance: 27.000

21 April 2012 2	Trabzonspor	1–0	Beşiktaş	Trabzon
	Altıntop 69'			Stadium: Hüseyin Avni Aker Stadium

29 April 2012 3	Fenerbahçe	2–1	Beşiktaş	Istanbul
	Stoch 57'; Korkmaz 84' (o.g.)		Korkmaz 54'	Stadium: Şükrü Saracoğlu Stadium

1 May 2012 4	Beşiktaş	1–0	Fenerbahçe	Istanbul
	Almeida 45'			Stadium: BJK İnönü Stadium

4 May 2012 5	Galatasaray	2–2	Beşiktaş	Istanbul
	Melo 9'; Almeida 44' (o.g.)		Hološko 86'; Ujfaluši 88'	Stadium: Türk Telekom Arena

11 May 2012 6	Beşiktaş	1–1	Trabzonspor	Istanbul
	Hološko 70'		Adın 85'	Stadium: BJK İnönü Stadium

=== Turkish Cup ===
11 January 2012 Third qualifying	Beşiktaş	2–1	Gaziantep B.B.	Istanbul
	Kavlak 2'; Fernandes 73'	Report	Aslanoglu 84'	Stadium: BJK İnönü Stadium

22 March 2012 Fourth qualifying	Boluspor	1–0	Beşiktaş	Bolu
	Kiraz 77'	Report		Stadium: Bolu Atatürk Stadium

=== UEFA Europa League ===
By winning the Turkish Cup last year, Beşiktaş qualified for the 2011–12 UEFA Europa League, entering in the play-off round. After defeating Alania Vladikavkaz on aggregate, Beşiktaş was seeded in Group E, along with Stoke City, Dynamo Kyiv and Maccabi Tel Aviv

==== Play-off Round ====
18 August 2011 1st leg	Beşiktaş (Turkey)	3–0	Alania Vladikavkaz (Russia)	Istanbul
	Sivok 20'; Guti 75' (pen.); Almeida 89'	Report		Stadium: BJK İnönü Stadium; Attendance: 18,430

25 August 2011 2nd leg	Alania Vladikavkaz (Russia)	2–0	Beşiktaş (Turkey)	Vladikavkaz
	Gabulov 81'; Neco 88'	Report		Stadium: Republican Spartak Stadium; Attendance: 10,000

Beşiktaş won 3–2 on aggregate

==== Group stage ====
15 September 2011 1	Beşiktaş (Turkey)	5–1	Maccabi Tel Aviv (Israel)	Istanbul
	Almeida 3', 28'; Aurélio 50'; Korkmaz 53'; Edu 88'	Report	Kahat 49'	Stadium: BJK İnönü Stadium; Attendance: 17,936

29 September 2011 2	Stoke City (England)	2–1	Beşiktaş (Turkey)	Stoke-on-Trent
	Crouch 15'; Walters 78' (pen.)	Report	Hilbert 14'	Stadium: Britannia Stadium; Attendance: 23,551

20 October 2011 3	Dynamo Kyiv (Ukraine)	1–0	Beşiktaş (Turkey)	Kyiv
	Harmash 90+4'	Report		Stadium: Lobanovsky Dynamo Stadium; Attendance: 13,500

3 November 2011 4	Beşiktaş (Turkey)	1–0	Dynamo Kyiv (Ukraine)	Istanbul
	Korkmaz 68'	Report		Stadium: BJK İnönü Stadium; Attendance: 24,183

1 December 2011 5	Maccabi Tel Aviv (Israel)	2–3	Beşiktaş (Turkey)	Tel Aviv
	Yeini 59'; Lugasi 70'	Report	Quaresma 45+1', 90+2'; Toraman 47'	Stadium: Bloomfield Stadium; Attendance: 9,420

14 December 2011 6	Beşiktaş (Turkey)	3–1	Stoke City (England)	Istanbul
	Fernandes 59' (pen.); Pektemek 74'; Edu 82'	Report	Fuller 29'	Stadium: BJK İnönü Stadium; Attendance: 26,118

Pos	Team	Pld	W	D	L	GF	GA	GD	Pts	Qualification
1	(Turkey) Beşiktaş	6	4	0	2	13	7	+6	12	Advance to knockout phase
2	(England) Stoke City	6	3	2	1	10	7	+3	11	Advance to knockout phase
3	(Ukraine) Dynamo Kyiv	6	1	4	1	7	7	0	7	
4	(Israel) Maccabi Tel Aviv	6	0	2	4	8	17	−9	2	

Source: Soccerway

==== Round of 32 ====
14 February 2012 1st leg	Braga (Portugal)	0–2	Beşiktaş (Turkey)	Braga
		Report	Sivok 37'; Simão 58'	Stadium: Estádio Municipal de Braga; Attendance: 9,088

23 February 2012 2nd leg	Beşiktaş (Turkey)	0–1	Braga (Portugal)	Istanbul
		Report	Alan 25'	Stadium: BJK İnönü Stadium; Attendance: 25,000

Beşiktaş won 2–1 on aggregate

==== Round of 16 ====
8 March 2012 1st leg	Atlético Madrid (Spain)	3–1	Beşiktaş (Turkey)	Madrid
	Salvio 24', 27'; Adrián 37'	Report	Simão 53'	Stadium: Vicente Calderón Stadium; Attendance: 27,431

15 March 2012 2nd leg	Beşiktaş (Turkey)	0–3	Atlético Madrid (Spain)	Istanbul
		Report	Adrián 26'; Falcao 83'; Salvio 90+4'	Stadium: BJK İnönü Stadium; Attendance: 24,824

Beşiktaş lost 6–1 on aggregate

== Squad statistics ==
Appearances for competitive matches only

No.	Pos.	Name	League		Cup		Europe		Total	
No.	Pos.	Name	Apps	Goals	Apps	Goals	Apps	Goals	Apps	Goals
1	GK	(Turkey) Rüştü Reçber	9	0	1	0	5	0	15	0
3	DF	(Turkey) İsmail Köybaşı	25	0	1	0	9(1)	0	35(1)	0
4	MF	(Portugal) Manuel Fernandes	25(1)	5	1(1)	1	10	1	36(2)	7
5	DF	(Turkey) İbrahim Toraman	14(3)	1	1	0	7	1	32(3)	2
6	DF	(Czech Republic) Tomáš Sivok	25	4	1	0	12	2	38	6
7	MF	(Portugal) Ricardo Quaresma	16(2)	5	1	0	8	2	25(2)	7
8	MF	(Austria) Veli Kavlak	26(2)	1	1	1	7(4)	0	34(6)	2
9	FW	(Portugal) Hugo Almeida	19(3)	9	0(1)	0	7(2)	3	26(6)	12
10	FW	(Portugal) Bébé	0(3)	0	0	0	0	0	0(3)	0
11	FW	(Turkey) Mustafa Pektemek	14(16)	7	2	0	2(5)	1	19(19)	8
13	MF	(Germany) Roberto Hilbert	17(2)	1	1	0	5	1	23(2)	2
14	MF	(Spain) Guti	1	0	0	0	2	1	3	1
15	MF	(Turkey) Mehmet Aurélio	7(3)	0	1	0	4(2)	0	12(5)	1
17	MF	(Austria) Ekrem Dağ	17(5)	0	2	0	3(3)	0	22(8)	0
18	MF	(Turkey) Necip Uysal	19(9)	0	2	0	7(1)	0	28(10)	0
19	MF	(Turkey) Mehmet Akyüz	0(5)	0	0	0	0(1)	0	0(6)	0
20	MF	(Portugal) Simão	21(4)	3	2	0	9	2	32(4)	5
21	MF	(Turkey) Burak Kaplan	2(3)	0	0(1)	0	0	0	2(4)	0
22	DF	(Australia) Ersan Gülüm	3(1)	0	0	0	0	0	3(1)	0
23	FW	(Slovakia) Filip Hološko	7(11)	3	1(1)	0	3(6)	0	11(18)	3
24	MF	(Portugal) Júlio Alves	0(3)	0	0(1)	0	0(2)	0	0(6)	0
27	DF	(Brazil) Sidnei	8(2)	2	1	0	0(1)	0	9(3)	2
28	MF	(Germany) Fabian Ernst	27	2	0	0	10	0	37	2
33	FW	(Brazil) Edu	9(12)	3	0	0	3(4)	2	12(16)	5
55	DF	(Turkey) Egemen Korkmaz	31	1	2	0	12	2	45	3
66	MF	(Austria) Tanju Kayhan	4(6)	0	0	0	2	0	6(6)	0
80	MF	(Turkey) Muhammed Demirci	0(1)	0	0	0	0	0	0(1)	0
90	GK	(Turkey) Umut Kaya	0	0	0	0	0	0	0	0
93	DF	(Turkey) Atınç Nukan	0	0	0	0	0	0	0	0
99	GK	(Turkey) Cenk Gönen	25(1)	0	1	0	7	0	33(1)	0

== Transfers ==
=== In ===
No.	Pos.	Nat.	Name	Age	Moving from	Type	Transfer window	Ends	Transfer fee	Source
55	DF	(Turkey)	Egemen Korkmaz	29	Trabzonspor	Transfer	Summer	2015	Free	bjk.com
66	DF	(Austria)	Tanju Kayhan	21	Rapid Wien (Austria)	Transfer	Summer	2015	€1,050,000	bjk.com
21	MF	(Turkey)	Burak Kaplan	21	Bayer Leverkusen (Germany)	Transfer	Summer	2015	€650,000	bjk.com
8	MF	(Austria)	Veli Kavlak	22	Rapid Wien (Austria)	Transfer	Summer	2015	€750,000	bjk.com
11	FW	(Turkey)	Mustafa Pektemek	22	Gençlerbirliği	Transfer	Summer	2015	€4,000,000	bjk.com
27	DF	(Brazil)	Sidnei	21	Benfica (Portugal)	Loan	Summer	2012	€200,000	bjk.com
22	DF	(Turkey)	Ersan Gülüm	24	Adanaspor	Transfer	Summer	2015	€2,000,000	bjk.com
19	FW	(Turkey)	Mehmet Akyüz	25	TKİ Tavşanlı Linyitspor	Transfer	Summer	2015	€900,000	bjk.com
10	FW	(Portugal)	Bébé	20	Manchester United (England)	Loan	Summer	2012	€1,000,000	bjk.com
4	MF	(Portugal)	Manuel Fernandes	25	Valencia (Spain)	Transfer	Summer	2014	€2,000,000	bjk.com
33	FW	(Brazil)	Edu	29	Schalke 04 (Germany)	Loan	Summer	2012	€500,000	cnnturk.com
25	MF	(Portugal)	Júlio Alves	20	Atlético Madrid (Spain)	%50	Summer	2016	€3,100,000	internetspor.com

Total spending: ▼€16,150,000

=== Out ===
No.	Pos.	Nat.	Name	Age	Moving to	Type	Transfer window	Transfer fee	Source
8	FW	(Turkey)	Nihat Kahveci	31		Released	Summer	Free	bjk.com
	DF	(Turkey)	Ethem Yılmaz	22		Released	Summer	Free	
44	DF	(Turkey)	Erhan Güven	29	Mersin İdman Yurdu	Released	Summer	Free	mersinidmanyurdu.com
84	GK	(Turkey)	Hakan Arıkan	28	Mersin İdman Yurdu	Transfer	Summer	Free	mersinidmanyurdu.com
11	FW	(Brazil)	Mert Nobre	30	Mersin İdman Yurdu	Transfer	Summer	Free	mersinidmanyurdu.com
15	MF	(Brazil)	Rodrigo Tabata	30	Al Rayyan (Qatar)	Transfer	Summer	€1,150,000	bjk.com
	GK	(Turkey)	Rasim Mutlu	21	Erzurum B.B.	Released	Summer	Free	sondakika.com
	DF	(Turkey)	Menderes Korkmaz	21	Manavgat Evrensekispor	Transfer	Summer	Free	nehir.net
13	FW	(Brazil)	Bobô	26	Cruzeiro (Brazil)	Released	Summer	Free	goal.com
27	DF	(Italy)	Matteo Ferrari	31		Released	Summer	Free	sporaktif.com
	DF	(Turkey)	Erdem Özkurt	23	Beylerbeyi	Transfer	Summer	Undisclosed	
	MF	(Turkey)	Kemal Akbaba	23	Bursa Nilüferspor	Transfer	Summer	Undisclosed	baskf.org
	FW	(Turkey)	Gökhan Aydaş	22	Kahramanmaraşspor A.Ş.	Transfer	Summer	Undisclosed	
	MF	(Turkey)	Kerim Alıcı	20	Kastamonuspor	Transfer	Summer	Free	kastamonupostasi.com
	DF	(Turkey)	Gökhan Çalışır	23	Gaziantep BB	Transfer	Summer	Free	sporx.com
5	MF	(Germany)	Michael Fink	29	Samsunspor	Transfer	Summer	Free	sporx.com
	MF	(Turkey)	Soner Ergençay	23	Adana Demirspor	Transfer	Summer	Free	adanademirsporlular.com
	MF	(Turkey)	Abdullah Eryılmaz	22	TKİ Tavşanlı Linyitspor	Transfer	Summer	Undisclosed	sportaktik.com
14	MF	(Spain)	Guti	35		Released	Mid-season	Free	bjk.com
26	MF	(Turkey)	Onur Bayramoğlu	21	Gençlerbirliği	Transfer	Winter	Part Exchange	sabah.com.tr
	FW	(Turkey)	Ali Kuçik	20	Göztepe A.Ş.	Transfer	Winter	275K TL	spor.haberler.com
	FW	(Turkey)	Volkan Ekici	20	Göztepe A.Ş.	Transfer	Winter	Free	ajansspor.com
	DF	(Turkey)	Güven Gürsoy	19	Van BB	Transfer	Winter	Free	vanspor.org

Total income: ▲€1,150,000
