= Cumali Bişi =

Turkish footballer

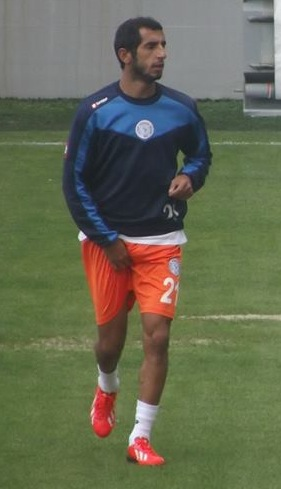
- Cumali Bişi (2014)

Personal information
- Full name: Cumali Bişi
- Date of birth: 15 June 1993 (age 33)
- Place of birth: Gebze, Kocaeli, Turkey
- Height: 1.73 m (5 ft 8 in)
- Position: Defensive midfielder

Team information
- Current team: Muşspor
- Number: 6

Youth career
- 2007–2010: Beşiktaş

Senior career*
Years	Team	Apps	(Gls)
2010–2012	Beşiktaş	2	(0)
2011–2012	→ Çaykur Rizespor (loan)	3	(0)
2012–2016	Çaykur Rizespor	28	(1)
2014–2015	→ Adana Demirspor (loan)	26	(0)
2016–2017	Boluspor	20	(0)
2017	Gaziantep FK	8	(0)
2017–2019	Balıkesirspor	62	(0)
2019–2020	Boluspor	30	(0)
2020–2022	Balıkesirspor	31	(2)
2022–2024	Şanlıurfaspor	60	(0)
2024–2025	Kastamonuspor 1966	19	(0)
2025	Sarıyer	14	(0)
2025–	Muşspor	35	(1)

International career
2010–2011	Turkey U18	7	(0)
2012–2013	Turkey U20	7	(0)
- * Club domestic league appearances and goals as of 1 October 2026

Cumali Bişi (born 15 June 1993) is a Turkish professional footballer who plays as a defensive midfielder for TFF 2. Lig club Muşspor.

== Career ==
=== Club career ===
Cumali Bişi began his youth career with Beşiktaş in 2007. He made his professional debut on the last matchday of the 2009–10 Süper Lig season against Bursaspor, replacing Michael Fink in the 73rd minute. On 7 July 2011, he joined Rizespor on a one-year loan.

On 8 August 2012, Cumali joined Rizespor permanently, signing a four-year contract. In his first season he helped Rizespor achieve promotion to the Süper Lig. On 24 August 2014, he joined Adana Demirspor on a one-year loan.

On 5 January 2016, Bişi joined Boluspor until the end of the season. On July 8, 2016, he agreed an extension with the club. On 31 January 2017, he joined Gaziantep. Later in that same year, on 7 September, he joined Balıkesirspor.

On 22 July 2019, Bişi rejoined Boluspor on a free transfer, signing a one-year contract. In October 2020, he rejoined Balıkesirspor on a free transfer.

On 22 July 2022, Cumali joined Şanlıurfaspor.

=== International career ===
Bişi represented Turkey at the 2013 FIFA U-20 World Cup.

== Career statistics ==
As of 1 December 2023

Appearances and goals by club, season and competition
Club	Season	League			National Cup		Total	
Club	Season	Division	Apps	Goals	Apps	Goals	Apps	Goals
Beşiktaş	2009–10	Süper Lig	1	0	1	0	2	0
Beşiktaş	2010–11	Süper Lig	1	0	0	0	1	0
Beşiktaş	Total		2	0	1	0	3	0
Rizespor (loan)	2011–12	TFF First League	3	0	0	0	3	0
Rizespor	2012–13	TFF First League	24	1	1	0	25	1
Rizespor	2013–14	Süper Lig	4	0	2	0	6	0
Rizespor	2015–16	Süper Lig	0	0	3	0	3	0
Rizespor	Total		31	1	6	0	37	1
Adana Demirspor (loan)	2014–15	TFF First League	26	0	5	0	31	0
Boluspor	2015–16	TFF First League	16	0	2	0	18	0
Boluspor	2016–17	TFF First League	4	0	6	0	10	0
Boluspor	Total		20	0	8	0	28	0
Gaziantep	2016–17	TFF First League	8	0	0	0	8	0
Balıkesirspor	2017–18	TFF First League	30	0	1	0	31	0
Balıkesirspor	2018–19	TFF First League	32	0	5	0	37	0
Balıkesirspor	Total		42	0	6	0	68	0
Boluspor	2019–20	TFF First League	30	0	0	0	30	0
Balıkesirspor	2020–21	TFF First League	28	1	0	0	28	1
Balıkesirspor	2021–22	TFF First League	26	1	0	0	26	1
Balıkesirspor	Total		54	2	0	0	54	2
Şanlıurfaspor	2022–23	TFF Second League	32	0	0	0	32	0
Şanlıurfaspor	2023–24	TFF First League	12	0	0	0	12	0
Şanlıurfaspor	Total		44	0	0	0	44	0
Career total			277	3	26	0	303	3
