= Romina Belluscio =

Argentine TV presenter for Antena 3

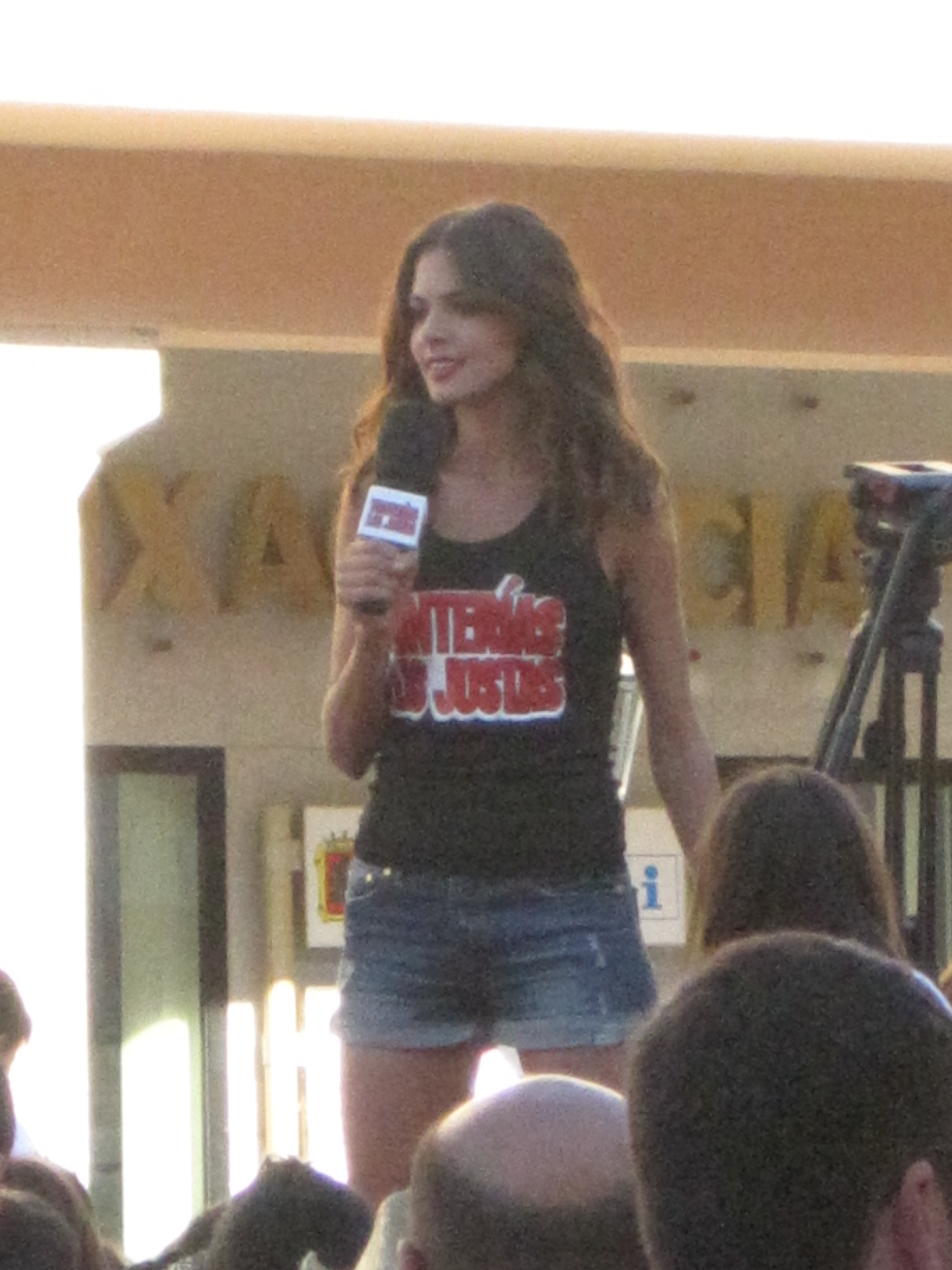
- Belluscio in 2010
- Born: 19 February 1979 (age 47); San Miguel de Tucuman, Argentina
- Occupation: Television presenter

Romina Belluscio (born 19 February 1979) is an Argentine TV presenter for Antena 3.

== Career ==
Is a TV collaborator in the TV show Espejo Publico, in the Spanish channel Antena 3. Until July, she was working in the TV show Tonterías Las Justas, in channel Cuatro. After that, she was working in the TV show La Huella in Tucumán.

== Personal life ==
Belluscio was born in San Miguel de Tucuman, Argentina. In 1999, she was proclaimed Miss Argentina, and then she went to Miss International in Japan. Nowadays she is living in Madrid, Spain, and is the wife of the ex-football player for Real Madrid Jose Maria Gutierrez "Guti". She is also the younger sister of the Argentinean football player Sebastian Belluscio (Deportivo Aguilares).
