= Hugo Almeida =

Portuguese footballer (born 1984)

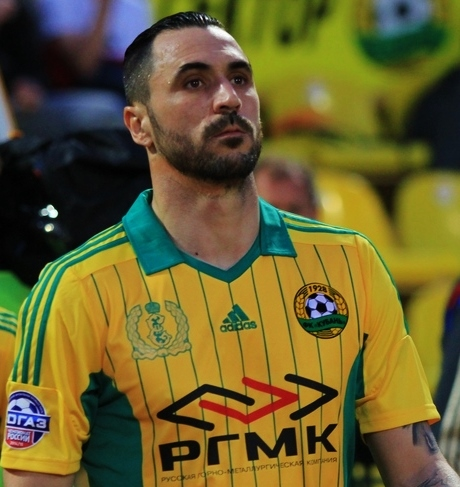
- Almeida with Kuban Krasnodar in 2015

Personal information
- Full name: Hugo Miguel Pereira de Almeida
- Date of birth: 23 May 1984 (age 42)
- Place of birth: Figueira da Foz, Portugal
- Height: 1.91 m (6 ft 3 in)
- Position: Centre-forward

Youth career
- 1993–1996: Buarcos
- 1996–2000: Naval
- 2001–2002: Porto

Senior career*
Years	Team	Apps	(Gls)
2002–2005	Porto B	25	(20)
2003–2007	Porto	33	(4)
2003	→ União Leiria (loan)	13	(3)
2004	→ União Leiria (loan)	14	(2)
2005	→ Boavista (loan)	14	(3)
2006–2007	→ Werder Bremen (loan)	28	(5)
2007–2010	Werder Bremen	89	(36)
2011–2014	Beşiktaş	85	(36)
2014–2015	Cesena	10	(0)
2015	Kuban Krasnodar	10	(2)
2015–2016	Anzhi	12	(2)
2016	Hannover 96	7	(1)
2016–2017	AEK Athens	22	(5)
2017–2018	Hajduk Split	14	(3)
2018–2020	Académica	33	(11)
Total		409	(133)

International career
2001	Portugal U16	4	(1)
2002	Portugal U18	5	(1)
2002–2003	Portugal U19	15	(8)
2003	Portugal U20	5	(0)
2004–2007	Portugal U21	27	(16)
2004	Portugal U23	4	(2)
2004–2006	Portugal B	4	(4)
2004–2015	Portugal	57	(19)

Managerial career
- 2020–2021: Académica B (assistant)
- 2021–2022: Académica (assistant)
- 2022–2024: Sepahan (assistant)
- 2024: Sepahan (interim)
- 2024–2025: Bodrum (assistant)
- 2025: Hatayspor
Medal record
Men's football
Representing Portugal
UEFA European Championship
Bronze medal – third place	2012 Poland-Ukraine
UEFA European Under-21 Championship
Third place	2004 Germany
UEFA European Under-19 Championship
Runner-up	2003 Liechtenstein
- * Club domestic league appearances and goals

Hugo Miguel Pereira de Almeida (born 23 May 1984) is a Portuguese former professional footballer who played as a centre-forward, currently a manager.

After failing to establish himself at Porto, being loaned several times during his contract, he made a name for himself in Germany with Werder Bremen where he remained for four seasons, reaching the 2009 UEFA Cup final and scoring 63 competitive goals. He also spent several years in Turkey with Beşiktaş, netting 47 times in 109 total games.

Almeida, whose international career with Portugal spanned over a decade, succeeded in becoming a regular after the departures of Pauleta in 2006 and Liédson in 2010. He represented the nation at two World Cups and as many European Championships, earning 57 caps and scoring 19 goals.

Almeida started working as a head coach in 2024, being in charge of Sepahan in Iran and Hatayspor in Turkey.

== Club career ==
=== Portugal ===
Born in Figueira da Foz, Coimbra District, Almeida started playing football for hometown club Naval 1º de Maio, before being signed by Porto still as a junior. He made his Primeira Liga debut in a 2–0 home win over Benfica on 21 September 2003, playing three minutes. Unable to settle at first, however, he had loan spells with União de Leiria (with which he had already played in the previous season, also on loan) and Boavista.

Almeida returned to Porto for 2005–06, having a relatively important role in a side that was crowned national champions. During that campaign's UEFA Champions League he scored a spectacular goal from a 35-metre free kick against Inter Milan at the San Siro, albeit in a 2–1 loss.

=== Werder Bremen ===
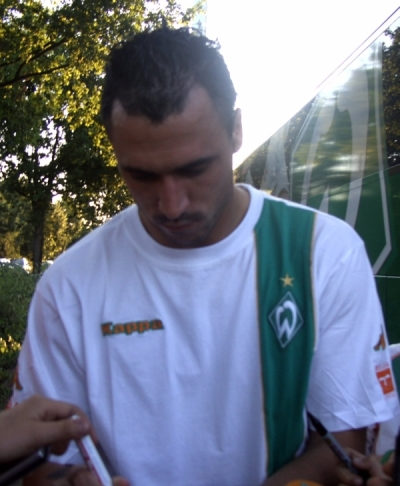
Almeida at Werder Bremen in 2006

Almeida served another loan stint in 2006–07, with a solid first year at the Bundesliga's Werder Bremen, where he rejoined former Porto teammate Diego. He totalled ten goals in 41 appearances (in all competitions), including one in a 2–1 home loss against Espanyol in the semi-finals of the UEFA Cup, his shot floating over the goalkeeper and into the net in an eventual 4–2 aggregate defeat; after seeing his chances at Porto definitely cut down with the arrival of strikers Edgar and Ernesto Farías in August 2007, he decided to accept Bremen's offer for a permanent switch, penning a four-year deal worth €4 million.

With the departure of Miroslav Klose, who signed for Bayern Munich, Almeida's chances of first-team action improved dramatically, and he started the 2007–08 season in scoring fashion, netting seven times in his first 12 league games, including two goals in a 4–1 victory over defending champions VfB Stuttgart. He would finish the season with 16 goals in all competitions – 11 in the league, as his club finished second behind Bayern – only surpassed in the team by Diego's 17.

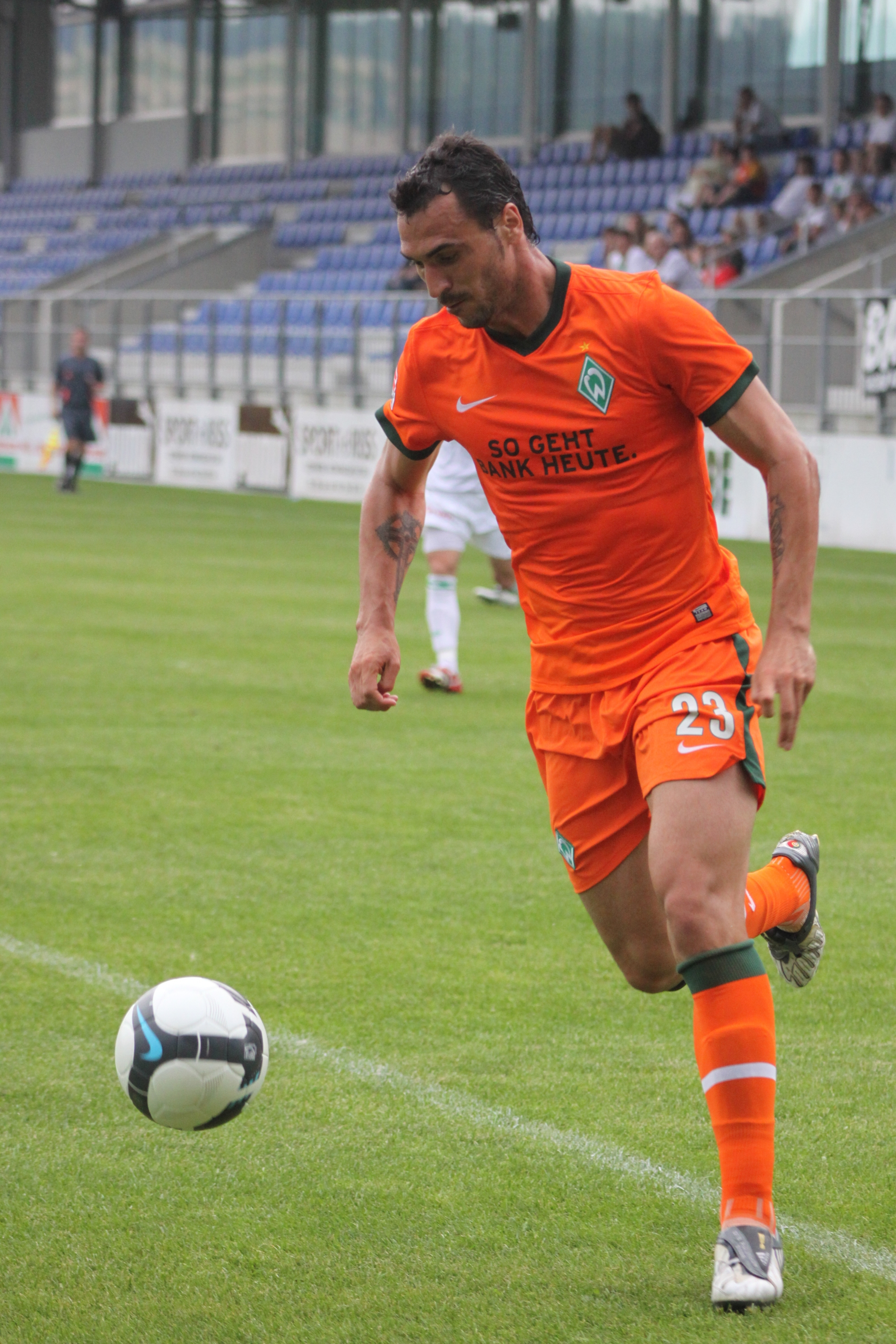
Almeida in action for Bremen in 2009

In 2008–09, another solid season, Almeida scored nine goals in the league, adding four in just five matches for the eventual DFB-Pokal winners – his first Bremen honour. His cup tally included a hat-trick against amateurs Eintracht Nordhorn, in a 9–3 away rout. In the Champions League he netted two more, being named the "Fans' Player of the match" in the 2–2 draw away to Anorthosis Famagusta. As the team were "demoted" to the UEFA Cup, he contributed one goal in eight games as the team went all the way to the final but, after receiving a yellow card in the 3–2 defeat of Hamburger SV in the semi-finals (3–3 aggregate win), he missed the decisive match against Shakhtar Donetsk.

Alternating starts with appearances from the bench, Almeida once again scored in double digits in the 2009–10 campaign, netting seven goals in the domestic league for a total of 11, as Bremen finished third and qualified for the Champions League play-off round, with the player assisting Claudio Pizarro in the third goal of the clash against Sampdoria (3–1 home win in the first leg, eventual 3–2 aggregate win).

Almeida started 2010–11 netting six times in the first ten league games. On 28 November 2010 he took his total to nine, after scoring three in a home win against FC St. Pauli (3–0) – in the dying minutes of the fixture, he was sent off after elbowing an opponent.

=== Beşiktaş ===
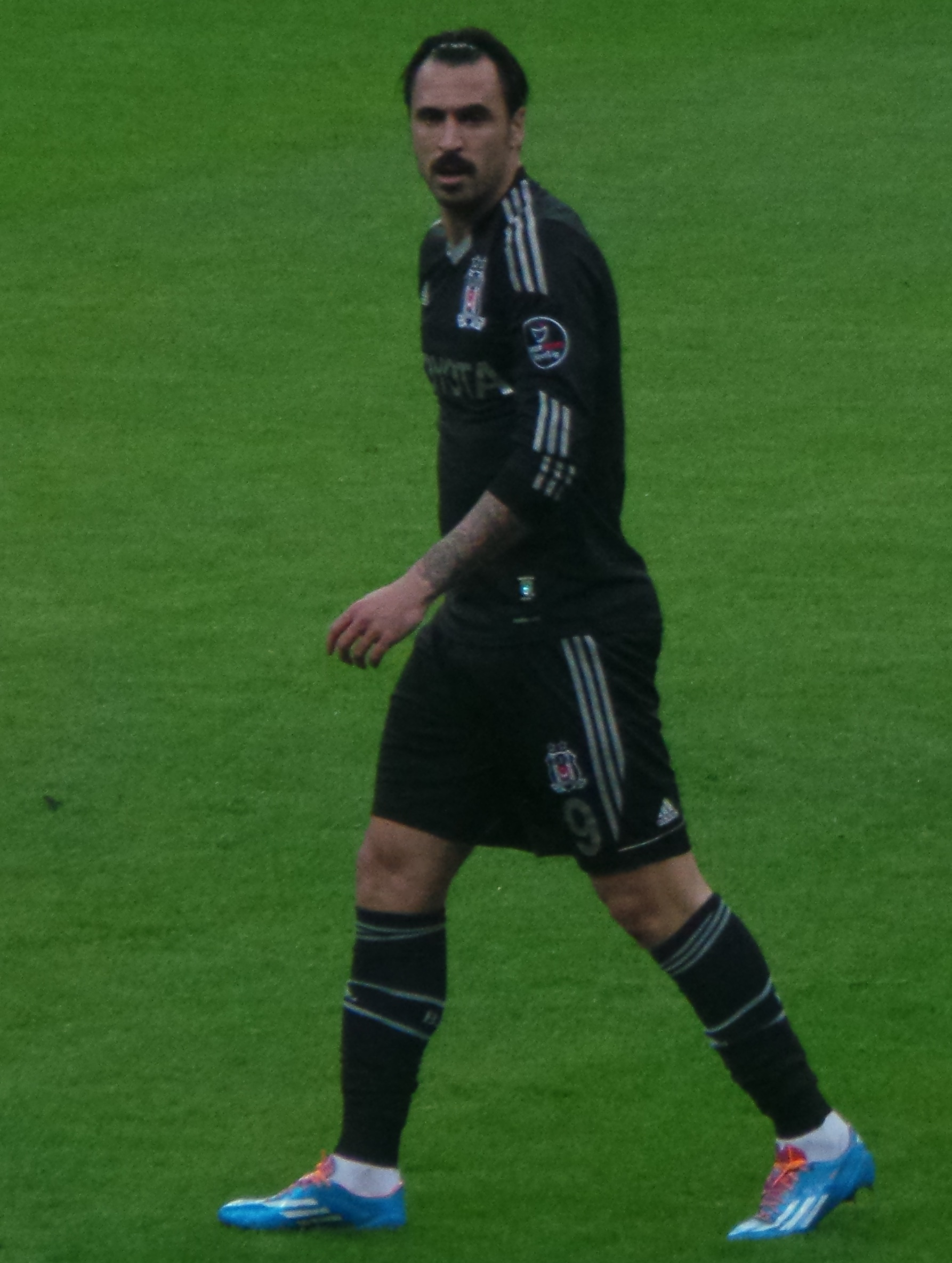
Almeida at Beşiktaş in 2014

On Christmas Eve 2010, after scoring 11 goals in 21 official games for Bremen during the season, Almeida joined Beşiktaş in the Süper Lig, having agreed to a three-and-a-half-year contract for €2 million. On 11 May 2011, he converted his penalty in the shootout as the Istanbul team won the Turkish Cup against İstanbul Başakşehir (4–3, 2–2 after extra time).

During his time in Istanbul, Almeida was part of a Portuguese contingent including manager Carlos Carvalhal and five teammates including fellow internationals Manuel Fernandes, Simão Sabrosa and Ricardo Quaresma.

=== Later career ===
On 7 October 2014, free agent Almeida signed for Serie A newcomers Cesena. However, he struggled at his new club, managing only seven starts and terminating his contract by mutual consent on 20 January 2015. A week later, he joined Russia's Kuban Krasnodar.

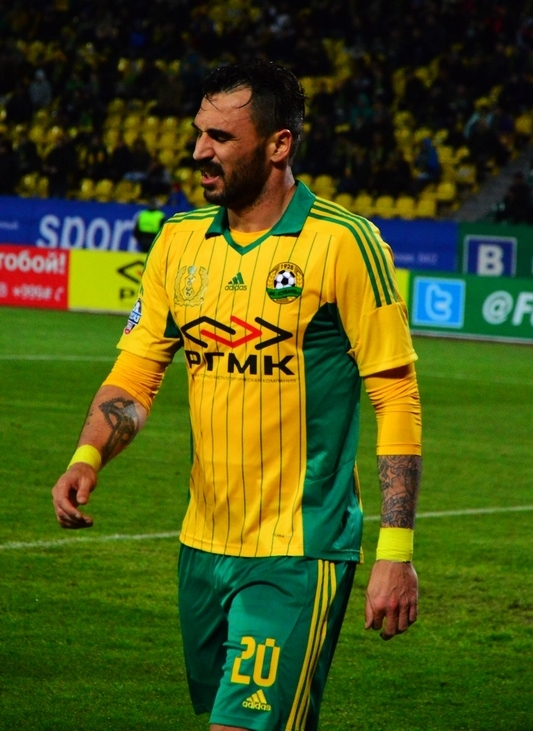
Almeida with Kuban in March 2015

Almeida moved to Anzhi Makhachkala who had just returned to the Russian Premier League on 8 July 2015. After just six months, both parties parted ways by mutual consent.

On 16 January 2016, Almeida returned to Germany and signed for Hannover 96 until summer 2017, reuniting with former Werder Bremen boss Thomas Schaaf in the process. He scored in his first appearance seven days later, but in a 2–1 home loss against Darmstadt 98. In February, he received a retrospective three-match ban for an elbow on FC Augsburg's Dominik Kohr, as the season ended with relegation.

Almeida joined AEK Athens from the Super League Greece on 18 July 2016, on a two-year contract. He scored twice in the first 15 minutes of his debut, a 4–1 home win over Xanthi on 11 September.

On 26 April 2017, in the return leg of the semi-finals of the Greek Football Cup against Olympiacos, Almeida played as an emergency goalkeeper for the first time in his career, after Giannis Anestis was sent off in the closing minutes of the game. His team eventually advanced to the final on away goals, after a 2–2 aggregate draw.

Almeida's contract was terminated by mutual consent on 30 August 2017. The following day he signed a one-year deal with Hajduk Split from the Croatian First Football League, with the option for a further season.

Almeida returned to Portugal after an absence of 12 years in July 2018, at the age of 34. Citing family reasons, he agreed to a two-year contract at Académica de Coimbra. He made his LigaPro debut on 18 August, playing 36 minutes in a 1–0 home defeat against Paços de Ferreira and eventually acting as a goalkeeper after Peterson Peçanha was sent off.

On 6 February 2020, Almeida announced his retirement.

== International career ==
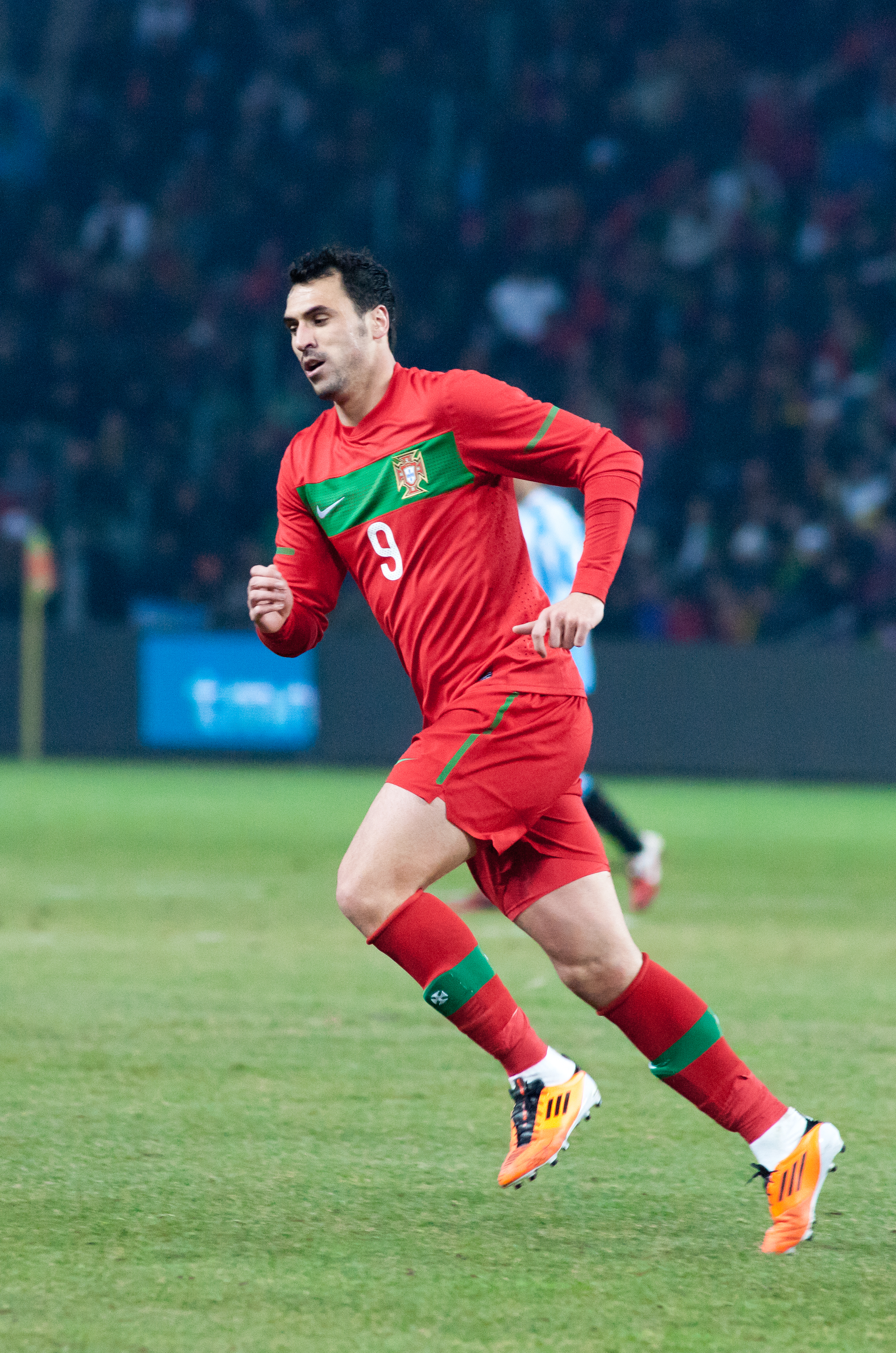
Almeida playing for Portugal in 2011

Almeida played at every level in international competitions, from the under-16 to the main Portugal national team. He made his full debut in a friendly against England on 18 February 2004, a 1–1 draw, and was also part of the squad that won the 2003 Toulon Tournament, also appearing at the 2004 and 2006 UEFA European Under-21 Championship finals.

Almeida was called for Portugal's final three UEFA Euro 2008 qualifiers, starting against Azerbaijan and scoring his first international goal. He also netted in the follow-up, a 1–0 win over Armenia, and these goals eventually proved vital as the nation clinched a tournament spot.

In Carlos Queiroz's second stint as national side coach, Almeida scored in a 4–0 victory in Malta on 6 September 2008, in the 2010 FIFA World Cup qualifying campaign. His importance diminished in late 2009, after the naturalisation of Sporting CP's Liédson.

Almeida was picked for the finals in South Africa. After the first match, a 0–0 against Ivory Coast, he replaced Liédson in the starting XI for the following match, with both players finding the net in the 7–0 rout of North Korea on 21 June 2010, in Cape Town.

Almeida was selected by new manager Paulo Bento for his Euro 2012 squad, initially as third choice after Hélder Postiga and Nélson Oliveira. After the former injured himself in the first half of the quarter-finals against Czech Republic, he replaced him, going on to start in the penalty shootout loss to Spain (0–0 after 120 minutes).

After being included in the list for the 2014 World Cup, Almeida started in the first group stage match against Germany, but was injured after just 28 minutes of play in an eventual 4–0 defeat. He went on to miss the second game against the United States with Postiga, who was also stretchered off after only 17 minutes, replacing him in the starting XI.

On 31 March 2015, Almeida captained Portugal for the first time in his final appearance, a 2–0 friendly loss to Cape Verde in Estoril.

== Coaching career ==
Following his retirement from playing, Almeida instantly went into coaching Académica's under-23 team. In 2021–22, he was assistant manager of the first team, serving four head coaches as the season ended with relegation to Liga 3; he left by mutual consent at the end of the campaign and waived his right to compensation or backlogged wages, due to the club's financial situation.

Almeida was briefly interim manager of Académica in March 2022, but did not oversee any match before the appointment of Zé Gomes. In June, he became assistant to compatriot José Morais at Sepahan in the Persian Gulf Pro League; he later acted as caretaker for the latter after Morais left for personal reasons.

Almeida subsequently worked in Turkey, with Bodrum (assistant) and Hatayspor (head coach). On 4 November 2025, following seven defeats and one draw in eight matches at the latter, his contract at the TFF 1. Lig side was terminated by mutual agreement.

== Career statistics ==
=== Club ===
Appearances and goals by club, season and competition
Club	Season	League			National cup (Note: Includes Taça de Portugal, DFB-Pokal, Turkish Cup, Russian Cup, Greek Football Cup, Croatian Football Cup)		Europe		Other		Total	
Club	Season	Division	Apps	Goals	Apps	Goals	Apps	Goals	Apps	Goals	Apps	Goals
Porto B	2001–02	Segunda Divisão	2	0	—		—		—		2	0
Porto B	2002–03	Segunda Divisão	15	16	—		—		—		15	16
Porto B	2003–04	Segunda Divisão	4	1	—		—		—		4	1
Porto B	2004–05	Segunda Divisão	4	3	—		—		—		4	3
Porto B	Total		25	20	—		—		—		25	20
Porto	2002–03	Primeira Liga	0	0	1	0	0	0	—		1	0
Porto	2003–04	Primeira Liga	3	0	2	0	2 (Note: Appearances in UEFA Champions League)	0	0	0	7	0
Porto	2004–05	Primeira Liga	3	0	0	0	2	0	0	0	5	0
Porto	2005–06	Primeira Liga	27	4	4	0	6	1	—		37	5
Porto	Total		33	4	7	0	10	1	0	0	50	5
União Leiria (loan)	2002–03	Primeira Liga	13	3	2	1	—		—		15	4
União Leiria (loan)	2003–04	Primeira Liga	14	2	1	0	—		—		15	2
Boavista (loan)	2004–05	Primeira Liga	14	3	2	0	—		—		16	3
Werder Bremen (loan)	2006–07	Bundesliga	28	5	1	0	12 (Note: Four appearances in UEFA Champions League, eight appearances and four goals in UEFA Cup)	4	—		41	9
Werder Bremen	2007–08	Bundesliga	23	11	2	1	11	4	—		36	16
Werder Bremen	2008–09	Bundesliga	27	9	5	4	10 (Note: Three appearances and two goals in UEFA Champions League, seven appearances and one goal in UEFA Cup)	3	—		42	16
Werder Bremen	2009–10	Bundesliga	26	7	4	1	6 (Note: Appearances in UEFA Europa League)	3	—		36	11
Werder Bremen	2010–11	Bundesliga	13	9	2	1	6	1	—		21	11
Werder Bremen	Total		89	36	13	7	33	11	—		135	54
Beşiktaş	2010–11	Süper Lig	12	4	6	4	2	0	—		20	8
Beşiktaş	2011–12	Süper Lig	22	10	1	0	9	3	3 (Note: Appearances in Süper Lig playoffs)	1	35	14
Beşiktaş	2012–13	Süper Lig	20	9	2	1	—		—		22	10
Beşiktaş	2013–14	Süper Lig	31	13	0	0	2	2	—		33	15
Beşiktaş	Total		85	36	8	5	13	5	3	1	109	47
Cesena	2014–15	Serie A	10	0	0	0	—		—		10	0
Kuban	2014–15	Russian Premier League	10	2	3	1	—		—		13	3
Anzhi Makhachkala	2015–16	Russian Premier League	12	2	2	2	—		—		14	4
Hannover 96	2015–16	Bundesliga	7	1	0	0	—		—		7	1
AEK Athens	2016–17	Super League Greece	21	4	5	0	1	0	—		27	4
AEK Athens	2017–18	Super League Greece	1	1	0	0	2 (Note: One appearance in UEFA Champions League, one appearance in UEFA Europa League)	0	—		3	1
AEK Athens	Total		22	5	5	0	3	0	—		30	5
Hajduk Split	2017–18	Prva HNL	14	3	2	0	—		—		16	3
Académica	2018–19	LigaPro	23	10	0	0	—		0	0	23	10
Académica	2019–20	LigaPro	10	1	2	0	—		2 (Note: Appearances in Taça da Liga)	0	15	1
Académica	Total		33	11	2	0	0	0	2	0	38	11
Career total			409	133	49	16	71	21	5	1	534	171

=== International ===
Appearances and goals by national team and year
National team	Year	Apps	Goals
Portugal	2004	1	0
Portugal	2005	0	0
Portugal	2006	1	0
Portugal	2007	4	2
Portugal	2008	11	1
Portugal	2009	6	3
Portugal	2010	10	6
Portugal	2011	6	3
Portugal	2012	7	1
Portugal	2013	7	1
Portugal	2014	3	2
Portugal	2015	1	0
Total		57	19

Scores and results list Portugal's goal tally first, score column indicates score after each Almeida goal.

List of international goals scored by Hugo Almeida
No.	Date	Venue	Opponent	Score	Result	Competition
1	13 October 2007	Tofik Bakhramov Stadium, Baku, Azerbaijan	Azerbaijan	2–0	2–0	Euro 2008 qualifying
2	17 November 2007	Estádio Dr. Magalhães Pessoa, Leiria, Portugal	Armenia	1–0	1–0	Euro 2008 qualifying
3	6 September 2008	Ta'Qali Stadium, Ta'Qali, Malta	Malta	2–0	4–0	2010 World Cup qualification
4	6 June 2009	Qemal Stafa stadium, Tirana, Albania	Albania	1–0	2–1	2010 World Cup qualification
5	12 August 2009	Rheinpark Stadion, Vaduz, Liechtenstein	Liechtenstein	1–0	3–0	Friendly
6	12 August 2009	Rheinpark Stadion, Vaduz, Liechtenstein	Liechtenstein	3–0	3–0	Friendly
7	3 March 2010	Estádio Cidade de Coimbra, Coimbra, Portugal	China	1–0	2–0	Friendly
8	8 June 2010	Wanderers Stadium, Johannesburg, South Africa	Mozambique	2–0	3–0	Friendly
9	8 June 2010	Wanderers Stadium, Johannesburg, South Africa	Mozambique	3–0	3–0	Friendly
10	21 June 2010	Cape Town Stadium, Cape Town, South Africa	North Korea	3–0	7–0	2010 FIFA World Cup
11	3 September 2010	Estádio D. Afonso Henriques, Guimarães, Portugal	Cyprus	1–1	4–4	Euro 2012 qualifying
12	17 November 2010	Estádio da Luz, Lisbon, Portugal	Spain	4–0	4–0	Friendly
13	10 August 2011	Estádio Algarve, Faro/Loulé, Portugal	Luxembourg	4–0	5–0	Friendly
14	10 August 2011	Estádio Algarve, Faro/Loulé, Portugal	Luxembourg	5–0	5–0	Friendly
15	2 September 2011	GSP Stadium, Nicosia, Cyprus	Cyprus	3–0	4–0	Euro 2012 qualifying
16	14 November 2012	Stade d'Angondjé, Libreville, Gabon	Gabon	2–1	2–2	Friendly
17	26 March 2013	Tofiq Bahramov Stadium, Baku, Azerbaijan	Azerbaijan	2–0	2–0	2014 World Cup qualification
18	10 June 2014	MetLife Stadium, New Jersey, United States	Republic of Ireland	1–0	5–1	Friendly
19	10 June 2014	MetLife Stadium, New Jersey, United States	Republic of Ireland	3–0	5–1	Friendly

== Honours ==
Porto

- Primeira Liga: 2003–04, 2005–06
- Taça de Portugal: 2002–03, 2005–06
- UEFA Champions League: 2003–04

Werder Bremen

- DFB-Pokal: 2008–09
- UEFA Cup runner-up: 2008–09

Beşiktaş

- Turkish Cup: 2010–11

AEK Athens

- Greek Football Cup runner-up: 2016–17

Individual

- Turkish Cup top scorer: 2010–11
