= Guti =

Spanish footballer and manager (born 1976)

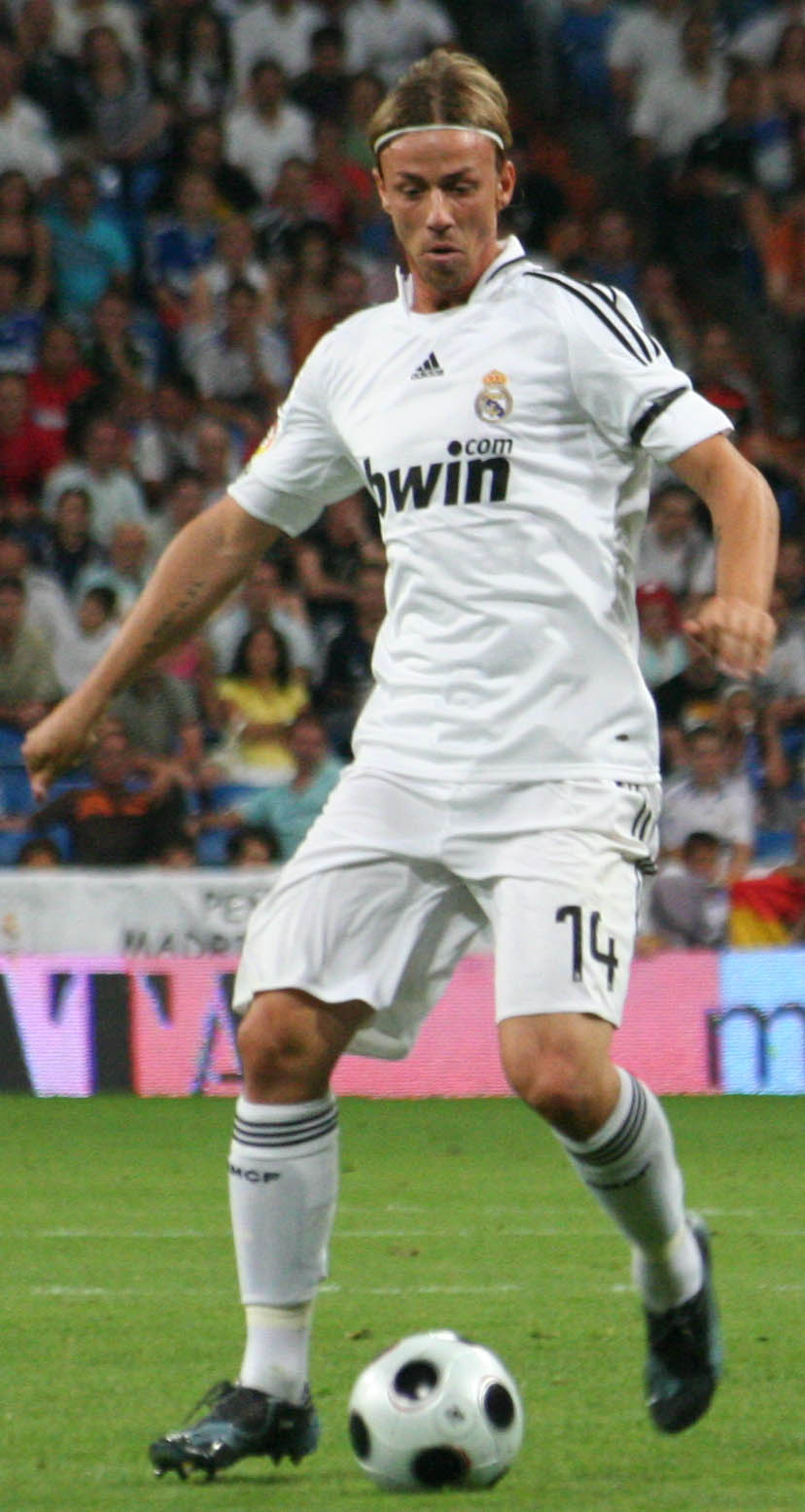
- Guti with Real Madrid in 2008

Personal information
- Full name: José María Gutiérrez Hernández
- Date of birth: 31 October 1976 (age 49)
- Place of birth: Torrejón de Ardoz, Spain
- Height: 1.82 m (6 ft 0 in)
- Position: Attacking midfielder

Youth career
- 1986–1994: Real Madrid

Senior career*
Years	Team	Apps	(Gls)
1994–1995	Real Madrid C	3	(0)
1995–1996	Real Madrid B	26	(11)
1995–2010	Real Madrid	387	(46)
2010–2011	Beşiktaş	23	(7)
Total		439	(64)

International career
1995	Spain U18	4	(1)
1996–1998	Spain U21	8	(1)
1999–2005	Spain	13	(3)

Managerial career
- 2013–2018: Real Madrid (youth)
- 2018–2019: Beşiktaş (assistant)
- 2019–2020: Almería
Medal record
Representing Spain
UEFA European Under-21 Championship
Winner	1998 Romania
- * Club domestic league appearances and goals

José María Gutiérrez Hernández (born 31 October 1976), known as Guti, is a Spanish former professional footballer who played as an attacking midfielder.

During his career, he played almost exclusively for Real Madrid – appearing in 542 official games and serving as vice-captain – helping the club to win 15 trophies, most notably three Champions League titles and five La Liga championships. He also competed in Turkey with Beşiktaş.

Guti played 13 times with Spain, making his debut in 1999. He worked as a manager after retiring.

== Club career ==
=== Real Madrid ===
Born in Torrejón de Ardoz, Community of Madrid, Guti began playing for Real Madrid's cantera in 1986, initially as a striker but being later moved to midfield, and remained there for the vast majority of his career. He made his first-team debut on 2 December 1995, in a 4–1 home win against Sevilla FC; he finished the season with one goal in nine appearances.

Guti added two trophies to his cabinet in 1997, La Liga and the Supercopa de España, playing 17 competitive games during the campaign. In 1997–98, he was part of the squad that lifted the UEFA Champions League and the Intercontinental Cup, with the player also adding the UEFA European Under-21 Championship.

1999–2000 started badly for Guti: struggling with the responsibility of replacing Clarence Seedorf, he was sent off for kicking a fallen adversary in a home fixture against Real Sociedad; this negative trait was often recurrent, as he was given his marching orders eight times during his career in the league alone. In the season, in which he also captured the Champions League, he scored six goals in 28 games. He had his best individual input the following year, netting 14 times and playing mostly as a striker due to injuries to Fernando Morientes, and contributing greatly to the team's 27th league title and the subsequent domestic Supercup.

Guti totalled eight goals in 63 games from 2001 to 2003, contributing three in nine matches as the 2001–02 Champions League ended in victory. After the purchase of Ronaldo in summer 2002 he returned to midfield, and his scoring rate went down drastically.

Guti had his lowest season in terms of scoring in the 2004–05 season, as he failed to find the net for the first time in seven years with the first team. He only managed one official goal, in an international against San Marino on 9 February 2005.

In 2005–06, Guti played 43 games and netted six times (four in the league and two in European competition). On 15 January 2006, he provided a backheel assist for Zinedine Zidane in the 4–2 home victory over Sevilla.

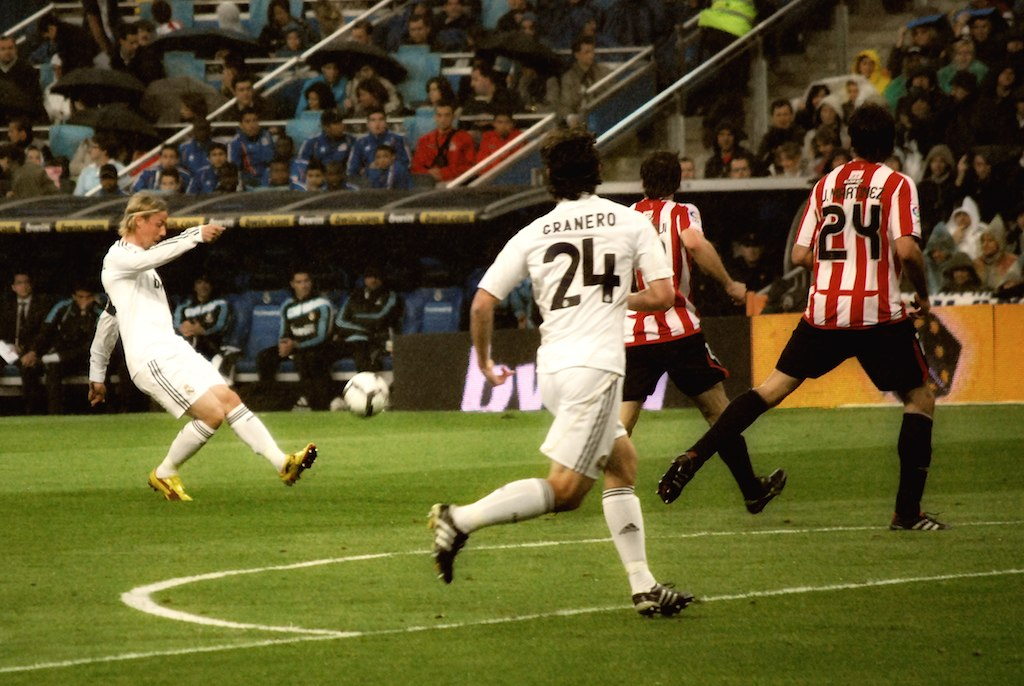
Guti executing a pass during a 2010 game against Athletic Bilbao

With the election of Ramón Calderón as club president and his subsequent vow to bring AC Milan's Brazilian star Kaká to Real Madrid, Guti's future at the Santiago Bernabéu Stadium appeared insecure. He was linked with a move away to cross-town rivals Atlético Madrid but, in the end, decided to remain with Real while Kaká stayed in Italy.

With Zidane retired, Guti found himself as the creative playmaker for the 2006–07 campaign, his preferred position. His excellent short and through pass abilities, especially a performance in a 3–2 home win over Sevilla on 6 May 2007 in which he played just 32 minutes from the bench, contributed to many of the goals which helped Real Madrid become league champions for the 30th time.

On 10 February 2008, Guti scored two goals and added four assists in a home game against Real Valladolid, for which he was named Player of the match– his team won 7–0 and ultimately lifted another champions trophy. On 14 September, he scored their 5,000th league goal in a 4–3 defeat of CD Numancia.

In 2009–10, already with Kaká on board, Guti still managed to appear significantly in the early stages, netting twice in the league. However, in late October, following the 4–0 shock defeat at AD Alcorcón in the round of 32 of the Copa del Rey, he allegedly insulted coach Manuel Pellegrini at half-time, being then left out of the playing squads for a lengthy period; after being reinstated he suffered with some injuries but, due to the Brazilian also having physical problems, managed to appear regularly until the season's end.

=== Beşiktaş ===
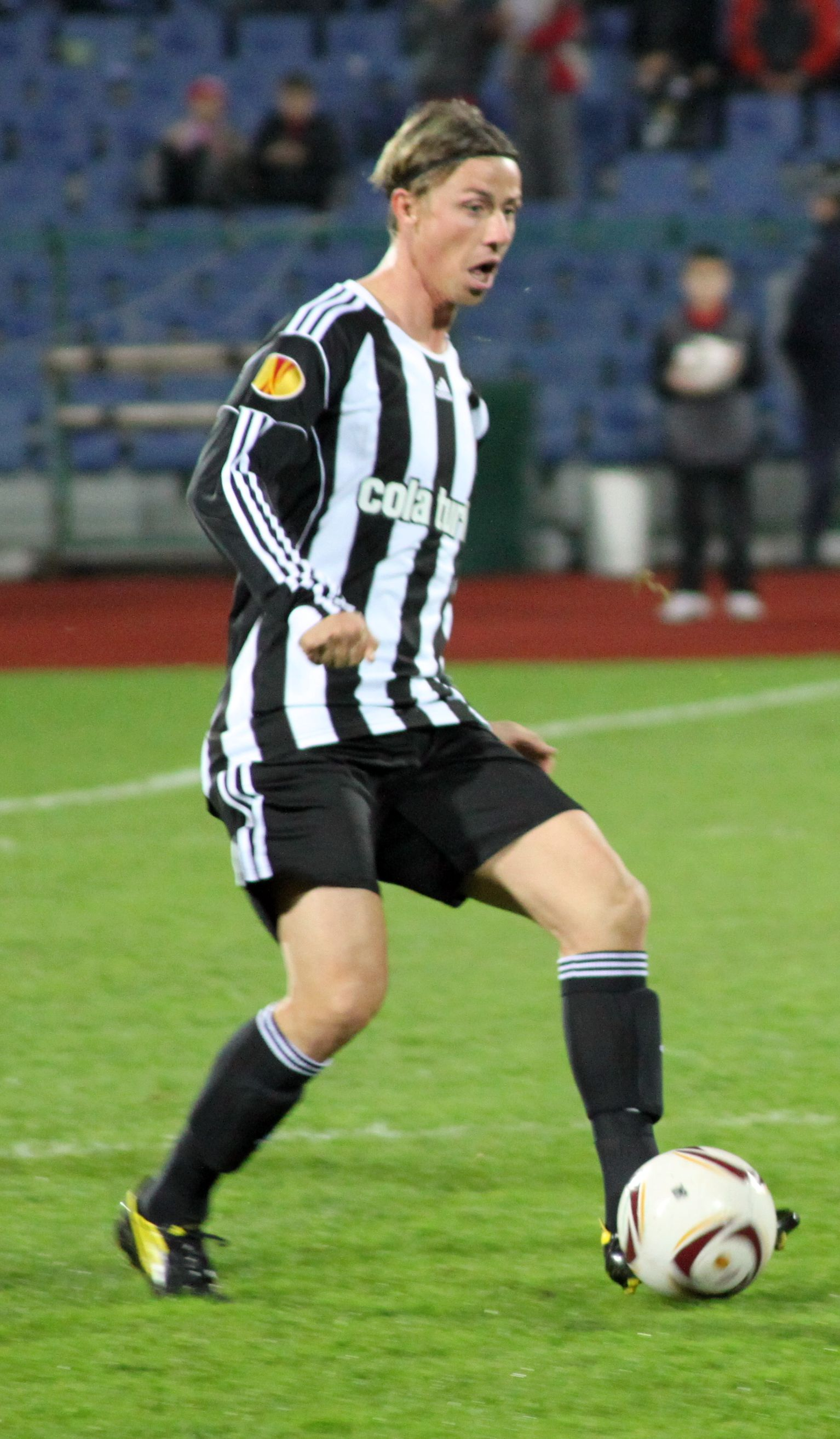
Guti playing for Beşiktaş in December 2010

On 25 July 2010, Guti left Real Madrid after nearly 25 years of service; he said: "I have an offer from Beşiktaş JK, but I haven't decided yet". The deal was concluded the following day, with the player signing a two-year contract. He started in his first competitive match for the Istanbul-based club, assisting in the game's only goal against Bucaspor.

Guti contributed to Beşiktaş' victory against Galatasaray SK with one goal and one assist on 28 November 2010; it was the team's first win at the Ali Sami Yen Stadium in six years. On 11 May 2011, he started as they won the Turkish Cup against İstanbul Büyükşehir Belediyespor on penalties (4–3, 2–2 after extra time); it was the first domestic cup of his professional career.

Guti was deemed surplus to requirements at Beşiktaş for 2011–12, following the appointment of new manager Carlos Carvalhal. On 15 November 2011, the 35-year-old was released.

== International career ==
A Spain international since 5 May 1999 (Spain–Croatia, 3–1), Guti nevertheless failed to appear in any tournament's final stage for his country, winning a total of 13 caps in six years.

Previously, he won the UEFA European Under-18 Championship in 1995, followed by the under-21 one in 1998.

== Coaching career ==
Guti announced his retirement from football on 21 September 2012, and said "I'm going to train to become a sporting director or a coach and I'd like to train youngsters... I'd really like to coach the Real Madrid youth team. That's my dream." He started working as a manager in 2013, going on to work with Real Madrid's youths for several years.

On 4 July 2018, Guti was named Şenol Güneş's assistant at former club Beşiktaş. On 5 November 2019, he was appointed head coach of Spanish Segunda División's UD Almería. The following February, he offered to resign and to refund his salary if rumours that he attended a nightclub with players after a defeat could be proven; on 26 June, he was sacked after a 0–1 home defeat to AD Alcorcón and replaced by Mário Silva.

== Style of play ==
Originally a striker, Guti later developed into a talented playmaker, who was known in particular for his vision, technique, creativity, passing range and ability to provide assists for teammates; he also possessed an eye for goal courtesy of his ability to make late runs into the box. A versatile player, he was usually deployed as an attacking midfielder behind the forwards, which was his preferred position, but was also capable of playing as a second striker, a winger or in a defensive midfield role as a deep-lying playmaker.

Despite his talent, Guti was known to be injury prone and also had a controversial character, which along with his turbulent personal life off the pitch led him to have difficulties with several of his managers throughout his career. He was also accused by certain pundits of being inconsistent and of having a poor work-rate.

== Personal life ==
Guti married Arancha de Benito, a Spanish television celebrity, on 22 June 1999. The couple divorced after almost ten years of marriage and two children, Zayra (born 2000) and Aitor (2002) – with his shirt reading "GUTI.HAZ" from 2007 to 2010 as an homage – but remained close friends; on 14 July 2016, he married Argentine TV presenter Romina Belluscio, who gave birth to his youngest son Enzo in 2013.

Guti's cousin, Javi Hernández, also played youth football for Real Madrid.

=== Other ventures ===
Guti played himself in two motion pictures, Torrente 3: El Protector and Goal II: Living the Dream. He also appeared in a 2005 documentary/movie about Real Madrid called Real, The Movie. He was a judge on the 2013 Spanish version of Celebrity Splash! on Antena 3.

== Career statistics ==
=== Club ===
Appearances and goals by club, season and competition
Club	Season	League			National cup		Europe		Other		Total	
Club	Season	Division	Apps	Goals	Apps	Goals	Apps	Goals	Apps	Goals	Apps	Goals
Real Madrid C	1994–95	Segunda División B	2	0	—		—		—		2	0
Real Madrid C	1995–96	Segunda División B	1	0	—		—		—		1	0
Real Madrid C	Total		3	0	0	0	0	0	0	0	3	0
Real Madrid B	1995–96	Segunda División	26	11	—		—		—		26	11
Real Madrid	1995–96	La Liga	9	1	0	0	0	0	—		9	1
Real Madrid	1996–97	La Liga	14	0	3	0	0	0	—		17	0
Real Madrid	1997–98	La Liga	17	1	1	0	2	0	2	0	22	1
Real Madrid	1998–99	La Liga	28	1	4	2	4	0	—		36	3
Real Madrid	1999–2000	La Liga	28	6	4	1	10	1	3	0	45	8
Real Madrid	2000–01	La Liga	32	14	0	0	12	4	2	0	46	18
Real Madrid	2001–02	La Liga	29	4	7	6	9	3	1	0	46	13
Real Madrid	2002–03	La Liga	34	4	3	2	15	5	2	2	54	13
Real Madrid	2003–04	La Liga	26	2	8	1	9	0	2	0	45	3
Real Madrid	2004–05	La Liga	31	0	0	0	8	0	—		39	0
Real Madrid	2005–06	La Liga	33	4	4	0	7	2	—		44	6
Real Madrid	2006–07	La Liga	30	1	0	0	7	0	—		37	1
Real Madrid	2007–08	La Liga	32	3	4	1	7	0	2	0	45	4
Real Madrid	2008–09	La Liga	18	3	1	0	6	0	2	0	27	3
Real Madrid	2009–10	La Liga	26	2	1	0	3	1	—		30	3
Real Madrid	Total		387	46	40	13	99	16	16	2	542	77
Beşiktaş	2010–11	Süper Lig	22	7	6	3	9	1	—		37	11
Beşiktaş	2011–12	Süper Lig	1	0	0	0	2	1	—		3	1
Beşiktaş	Total		23	7	6	3	11	2	—		40	12
Career total			439	64	46	16	110	18	16	2	611	100

=== International ===
Appearances and goals by national team and year
National team	Year	Apps	Goals
Spain	1999	1	0
Spain	2000	2	0
Spain	2001	0	0
Spain	2002	3	1
Spain	2003	4	1
Spain	2004	2	0
Spain	2005	1	1
Total		13	3

Scores and results list Spain's goal tally first, score column indicates score after each Guti goal.

List of international goals scored by Guti
No.	Date	Venue	Opponent	Score	Result	Competition
1	12 October 2002	Carlos Belmonte, Albacete, Spain	Northern Ireland	2–0	3–0	UEFA Euro 2004 qualifying
2	12 February 2003	Son Moix, Palma, Spain	Germany	3–1	3–1	Friendly
3	9 February 2005	Juegos Mediterráneos, Almería, Spain	San Marino	4–0	5–0	2006 FIFA World Cup qualification

== Managerial statistics ==
As of match played 25 June 2020

Managerial record by team and tenure
Team	Nat	From	To	Record								Ref
Team	Nat	From	To	G	W	D	L	GF	GA	GD	Win %	Ref
Almería	(Spain)	5 November 2019	26 June 2020	22	9	5	8	35	24	+11	40.91	
Total				22	9	5	8	35	24	+11	40.91	—

== Honours ==
=== Player ===
Real Madrid

- La Liga: 1996–97, 2000–01, 2002–03, 2006–07, 2007–08
- Supercopa de España: 1997, 2001, 2003, 2008
- UEFA Champions League: 1997–98, 1999–2000, 2001–02
- UEFA Super Cup: 2002
- Intercontinental Cup: 1998, 2002

Beşiktaş

- Turkish Cup: 2010–11

Spain U18

- UEFA European Under-18 Championship: 1995

Spain U21

- UEFA European Under-21 Championship: 1998

Individual

- Copa del Rey top scorer: 2001–02
- La Liga top assister: 2007–08
- UEFA La Liga Team of the Year: 2007–08

=== Manager ===
Real Madrid Youth

- División de Honor Juvenil de Fútbol: 2016–17
- Copa de Campeones Juvenil de Fútbol: 2016–17
- Copa del Rey Juvenil de Fútbol: 2016–17
