= Doğukan Pala =

Turkish footballer

Personal information
- Full name: Tevfik Doğukan Pala
- Date of birth: 10 July 1992 (age 34)
- Place of birth: Eminönü, Istanbul, Turkey
- Height: 1.73 m (5 ft 8 in)
- Position: Left back

Team information
- Current team: Tire 2021 FK

Youth career
- 2005–2011: Beşiktaş

Senior career*
Years	Team	Apps	(Gls)
2011–2012	Beşiktaş	1	(0)
2011–2012	→ Adana Demirspor (loan)	1	(0)
2012–2014	İstanbulspor	38	(1)
2014	Ümraniyespor	7	(0)
2014–2015	Kahramanmaraş BB	11	(1)
2015	İstanbulspor	14	(0)
2015–2016	Üsküdar Anadolu	22	(1)
2016–2018	Çorum FK	18	(0)
2017	→ Derincespor (loan)	13	(3)
2018–2019	Nazilli Belediyespor	0	(0)
2019–2020	Yeni Orduspor	15	(1)
2020–2021	Fatsa Belediyespor	27	(0)
2021–2022	Orduspor 1967	11	(0)
2022	Bergama Belediyespor	10	(0)
2022–2023	Adıyaman FK	14	(0)
2023	→ Elazığspor (loan)	11	(0)
2023–	Tire 2021 FK		

International career^{‡}
2011	Turkey U19	1	(0)
- * Club domestic league appearances and goals as of 20 May 2023 ‡ National team caps and goals as of 22:52, 5 April 2014 (UTC)

Tevfik Doğukan Pala (born 10 July 1992) is a Turkish professional footballer who plays as a left back for an amateur side Tire 2021 FK.

== Life and career ==
Pala began his career with Beşiktaş in 2005. He was taken to Under 18 team in 2008. He signed his professional contract on 25 January 2011. He made his professional debut on 11 March 2011 against Manisaspor. He was loaned to Adana Demirspor for 2011-12 season.
