= İskender Alın =

Turkish footballer

Personal information
- Date of birth: 28 February 1984 (age 42)
- Place of birth: Beykoz, Turkey
- Height: 1.79 m (5 ft 10 in)
- Position: Forward

Team information
- Current team: Şile Yıldızspor
- Number: 11

Youth career
- 2001–2002: Yozgatspor
- 2003: İstanbulspor
- 2003–2004: Fenerbahçe

Senior career*
Years	Team	Apps	(Gls)
2004–2006	Bakırköyspor	41	(16)
2006–2009	Kartalspor	78	(37)
2009–2011	Istanbul BB	64	(16)
2012	Istanbul BB	0	(0)
2012–2014	Boluspor	54	(14)
2014–2015	Bucaspor	31	(14)
2015–2016	Yeni Malatyaspor	11	(1)
2016–2017	Gaziantep BB	16	(2)
2017	Kastamonuspor	13	(4)
2017–2018	Bugsaşspor	20	(10)
2018–2019	Sarıyer	18	(4)
2019–	Şile Yıldızspor	7	(2)
- * Club domestic league appearances and goals as of 20:40, 11 December 2019 (UTC)

İskender Alın (born 28 February 1984) is a Turkish professional football player who currently plays as a forward for Şile Yıldızspor.

== Life and career ==
Alın began his football career when Yimpaş Yozgatspor signed him to a youth contract in 2001. He proceeded to bounce around at local clubs İstanbulspor and Fenerbahçe. He finished his youth career with 19 goals in 78 matches.

Alın made his professional breakthrough with Istanbul-based club Bakırköyspor in 2004. He was transferred to Kartalspor in 2006, and was transferred once more during the 2009 winter transfer window, this time to İstanbul Büyükşehir Belediyespor. He found his form in the 2009–10 season when he netted 10 goals, good enough for tenth place on the top scorers list.

On 14 July 2011 he was arrested because of match-fixing in Istanbul BB-Beşiktaş and was pardoned on 4 January 2012.
