= Korcan Çelikay =

Turkish footballer

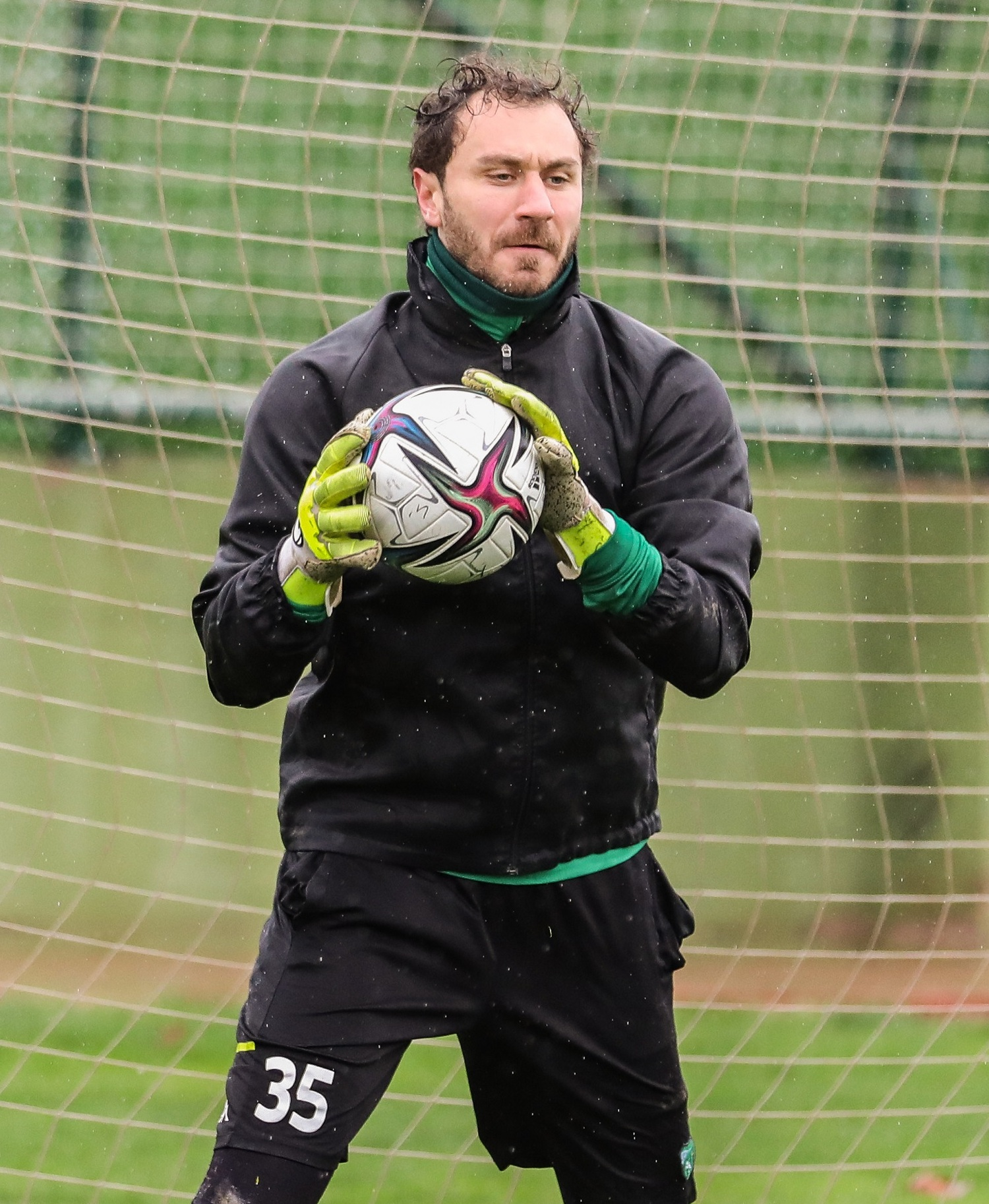
- Çelikay playing for Kocaelispor

Personal information
- Date of birth: 31 December 1987 (age 38)
- Place of birth: Safranbolu, Karabük, Turkey
- Height: 1.94 m (6 ft 4 in)
- Position: Goalkeeper

Youth career
- 2000–2004: Güngören B.S.
- 2004–2005: İstanbulspor
- 2005–2007: Beşiktaş

Senior career*
| Years | Team | Apps | (Gls) |
| 2007–2011 | Beşiktaş | 1 | (0) |
| 2007–2008 | → Tepecik Belediyespor (loan) | 11 | (0) |
| 2008–2009 | → Diyarbakırspor (loan) | 13 | (0) |
| 2010–2011 | → Sivasspor (loan) | 21 | (0) |
| 2011–2017 | Sivasspor | 78 | (0) |
| 2017–2021 | Ankaragücü | 87 | (0) |
| 2021–2022 | Kocaelispor | 20 | (0) |
| 2023 | Isparta 32 SK | 5 | (0) |
| 2023–2024 | Bucaspor 1928 | 19 | (0) |
| 2024–2025 | Adanaspor | 9 | (0) |

International career^{‡}
| 2005 | Turkey U18 | 1 | (0) |
| 2005 | Turkey U19 | 2 | (0) |
| 2011 | Turkey A2 | 2 | (0) |
- * Club domestic league appearances and goals as of 10 May 2025 ‡ National team caps and goals as of 20 December 2015

Korcan Çelikay (born 31 December 1987) is a Turkish professional footballer who plays as a goalkeeper.

== Club career ==
=== Beşiktaş ===
Çelikay had started his career at İstanbulspor in 2004 and joined Beşiktaş at the end of that season. He played at youth team until his promotion to senior squad in 2006–07 season by Jean Tigana.

Being unable to play for Beşiktaş for senior level, he was loaned out to Istanbul side Tepecik Belediyespor to play at TFF Third League in 2007–08 season.

In 2009–10 season, he made his senior level league debut against the season-end champion Bursaspor, he entered the game on 43rd minute right after the veteran first keeper of team Rüştü Reçber been injured, on 17th match-day, in which the team suffered a 3–2 home loss, on 18 December 2009, Friday. Following his debut, he played twice at Turkish Cup for the team up against Manisaspor and Konya Şekerspor due to the respective injuries of Reçber and Hakan Arıkan, the main choices for the goal.

=== Sivasspor ===
On 3 July 2011, along with Mecnun Otkaymaz, Sivasspor President, Korcan Çelikay was taken into custody due to Match fixing scope for alleged fixing at 34 week game of 2010–11 season between Sivasspor and Fenerbahçe. On 29 July 2011, İlhan Çelikay, elder brother of Korcan, was also detained. His elder brother İlhan was released at same day.

On 25 June 2012, following a one-season-long loan, Beşiktaş announced that Çelikay permanently joined Sivasspor.

On 28 April 2014, his shoulder was dislocated that ruled Çelikay out for rest of 2013–14 season.

=== Ankaragücü ===
On 25 June 2018, Çelikay prolonged his contract for an additional season with Ankaragcü.

== International career ==
Çelikay was called up 10 times for national youth football team, 2 times for U-18, 7 times for U-19, 1 time for U-21; sum of 10 times. During his national team experience, he has been capped 5 times for youth levels.
