= Samet Bülbül =

Turkish footballer

Personal information
- Full name: Samet Bülbül
- Date of birth: March 13, 1991 (age 35)
- Place of birth: Beykoz, Istanbul, Turkey
- Height: 1.76 m (5 ft 9 1/2 in)
- Position: Attacking midfielder

Team information
- Current team: Çatalcaspor
- Number: 22

Youth career
- 2001–2003: Ortaçeşme
- 2003–2010: Beşiktaş

Senior career*
Years	Team	Apps	(Gls)
2010–2014	Beşiktaş	0	(0)
2011	→ Bucaspor (loan)	5	(0)
2011–2013	→ Şanlıurfaspor (loan)	27	(2)
2013–2014	→ Nazilli Belediyespor (loan)	4	(0)
2015–2016	Bayrampaşaspor	8	(0)
2016–	Çatalcaspor	16	(1)

International career
2009	Turkey U19	2	(0)
- * Club domestic league appearances and goals

Samet Bülbül (born 13 March 1991) is a Turkish professional footballer who plays as an attacking midfielder for Çatalcaspor. His height is 1.76 meters.

== Career ==
Born in Beykoz, Samet began his career with local club Ortaçeşme in 2001. He played for Beşiktaş' youth sides until 2010 when he signed a professional contract with the club.
