= Burak Kaplan =

Turkish-German association football player

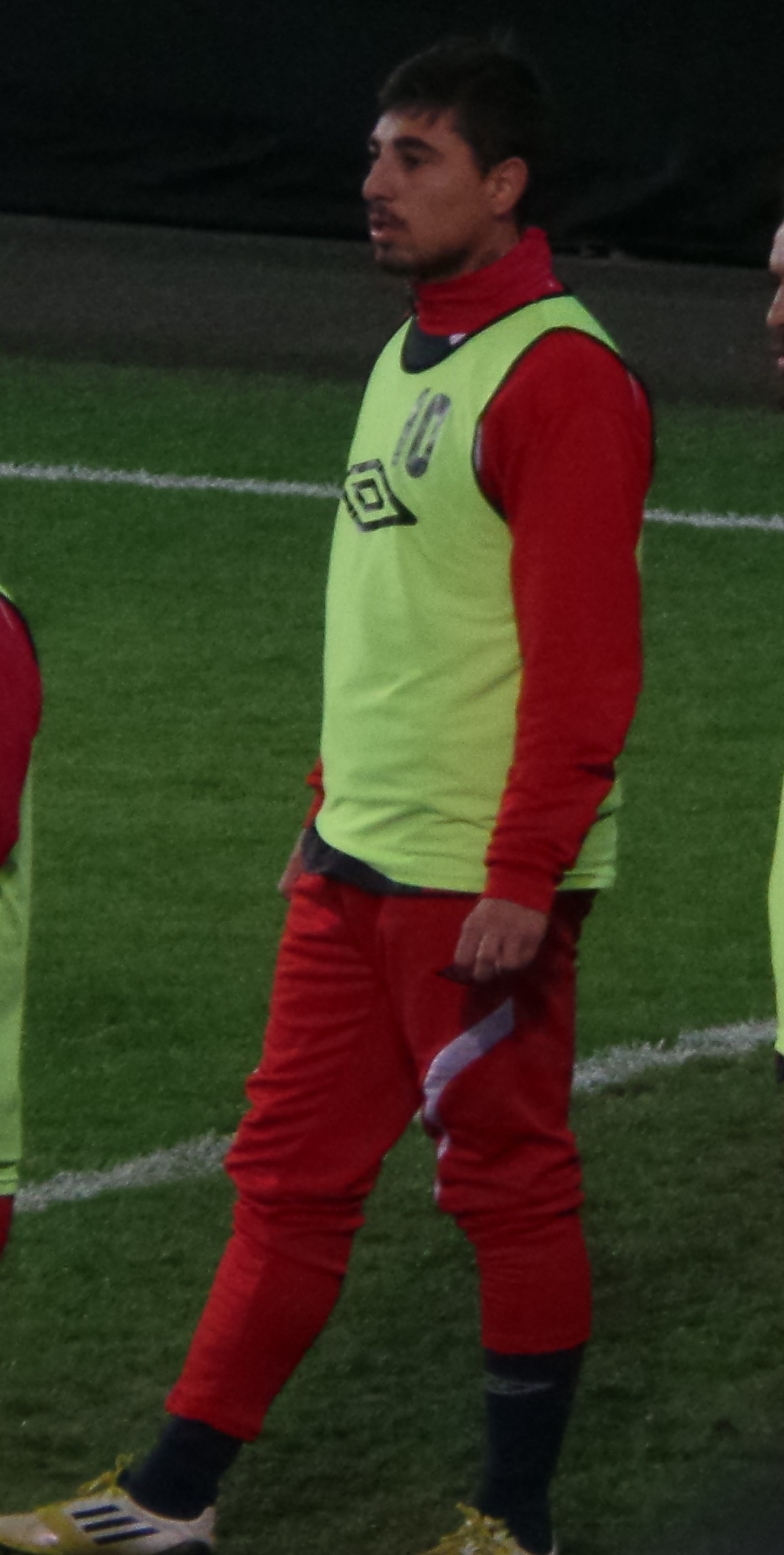

Personal information
- Full name: Burak Kaplan
- Date of birth: 1 February 1990 (age 36)
- Place of birth: Cologne, West Germany
- Height: 1.68 m (5 ft 6 in)
- Positions: Attacking midfielder; left winger

Youth career
- 1994–1997: SSV Vingst
- 1997–2008: Bayer Leverkusen

Senior career*
Years	Team	Apps	(Gls)
2008–2010	Bayer Leverkusen II	32	(10)
2009–2011	Bayer Leverkusen	4	(2)
2011	→ Greuther Fürth (loan)	6	(3)
2011–2014	Beşiktaş	5	(0)
2013	→ SV Babelsberg 03 (loan)	10	(0)
2013	→ Fethiyespor (loan)	2	(0)
2014	→ KFC Uerdingen 05 (loan)	11	(0)
2014–2017	Wattenscheid 09	49	(14)
2017	FC Kray	14	(6)
Total		133	(35)

International career
2007	Turkey U16	4	(0)
2009	Turkey U19		
2010–2012	Turkey U21	13	(5)
- * Club domestic league appearances and goals

Burak Kaplan (born 1 February 1990) is a Turkish-German former professional football midfielder who played as an attacking midfielder or left winger.

== Club career ==
Kaplan made his Bundesliga debut on 11 December 2009 for Bayer Leverkusen against Hertha BSC. He scored the 2–1 go-ahead goal in the 90th minute, only to see the 2–2 equalizing goal be scored by the other club in the additional time. Subsequently, on 13 December 2009, he signed a professional contract with Leverkusen for three years until 2012.

In July 2014, his contract with Beşiktaş was dissolved and he joined German fourth tier Regionalliga West side Wattenscheid 09.
