= Kemal Akbaba =

Turkish footballer (born 1988)

Personal information
- Date of birth: 1 April 1988 (age 38)
- Place of birth: Selim, Turkey
- Height: 1.82 m (6 ft 0 in)
- Position: Striker

Team information
- Current team: Ayvalıkgücü Belediyespor
- Number: 10

Youth career
- 2000: Gençlerbirliği
- 2001: Bahçelispor
- 2002–2004: Gençlerbirliği

Senior career*
Years	Team	Apps	(Gls)
2005–2010	Gençlerbirliği	6	(1)
2005–2007	→ Hacettepespor (loan)	46	(9)
2007	→ Samsunspor (loan)	13	(2)
2008	→ Türk Telekomspor (loan)	7	(2)
2009	→ Hacettepespor (loan)	4	(0)
2010	→ Kırşehirspor (loan)	7	(0)
2010–2011	Beşiktaş JK A2	0	(0)
2011–2013	Nilüferspor	9	(1)
2013–2014	BB Erzurumspor	5	(2)
2014	Sandıklıspor	8	(2)
2014–2015	Aydınspor 1923	15	(4)
2015	Kahramanmaraş BB	1	(0)
2015	Muğlaspor	9	(4)
2016	Edirnespor	9	(2)
2016	Hacettepe	4	(0)
2016–2017	Kahramanmaraşspor	11	(2)
2018	Pazarspor	6	(1)
2018	Vefa	12	(6)
2019	Zaferspor	10	(9)
2019	TKİ Tavşanlı Linyitspor	11	(9)
2020–2021	Bağcılar SK	9	(11)
2021	Ayvalıkgücü Belediyespor	0	(0)
2021	Mersin 33 FK		
2021–2022	Bağcılar SK		
2022–	Ayvalıkgücü Belediyespor	10	(5)

International career^{‡}
2005–2006	Turkey U18	7	(0)
2006–2007	Turkey U19	4	(0)
- * Club domestic league appearances and goals as of 13 November 2022 ‡ National team caps and goals as of 25 November 2016

Kemal Akbaba (born 1 April 1988) is a Turkish football player who plays as a striker for Ayvalıkgücü Belediyespor.
