= Güven Gürsoy =

Turkish footballer (born 1992)

Personal information
- Full name: Güven Gürsoy
- Date of birth: 7 February 1992 (age 34)
- Place of birth: Malatya, Turkey
- Position: Right winger

Team information
- Current team: Kırıkhanspor
- Number: 17

Youth career
- 2002–2008: Malatyaspor

Senior career*
Years	Team	Apps	(Gls)
2008–2011	Malatyaspor	63	(5)
2011–2012	Beşiktaş A2	0	(0)
2012–2013	Van BB	6	(0)
2013–2014	Üsküdar Anadolu	4	(0)
2014	Fatih Karagümrük	7	(0)
2014–2015	Sakaryaspor	10	(0)
2015–	Kırıkhanspor	14	(0)

International career^{‡}
2009	Turkey U16	1	(0)
2008	Turkey U17	3	(0)
- * Club domestic league appearances and goals as of 30 June 2012 ‡ National team caps and goals as of 18 February 2011

Güven Gürsoy (born 7 February 1992) is a Turkish professional footballer who plays as a defender for Belediye Vanspor.
