= Ali Kuçik =

Turkish footballer

Personal information
- Date of birth: 17 June 1991 (age 35)
- Place of birth: Kastamonu, Turkey
- Height: 1.79 m (5 ft 10 1/2 in)
- Positions: Forward; winger

Team information
- Current team: 68 Aksaray Belediyespor
- Number: 20

Youth career
- 2003–2004: Yavuz Sultan Selim
- 2004–2009: Beşiktaş

Senior career*
Years	Team	Apps	(Gls)
2009–2011	Beşiktaş	4	(1)
2011	→ Bucaspor (loan)	13	(2)
2011–2012	Karabükspor	8	(1)
2012–2014	Göztepe	40	(5)
2014	Tavşanlı Linyitspor	12	(1)
2014–2015	Fatih Karagümrük	33	(11)
2015–2017	1461 Trabzon	42	(13)
2017–2018	Kastamonuspor	18	(3)
2018–2019	Sarıyer	27	(6)
2019–2020	Bandırmaspor	18	(3)
2020–2021	Kırşehir FK	27	(3)
2021–2022	Iğdır	1	(0)
2022	Turgutluspor	11	(2)
2022–2023	Nevşehir Belediyespor	27	(10)
2023–	68 Aksaray Belediyespor	6	(2)

International career
2006–2007	Turkey U16	15	(4)
2007–2008	Turkey U17	15	(3)
2008–2009	Turkey U18	11	(4)
2009–2011	Turkey U19	9	(0)
2010	Turkey U20	2	(0)
2011	Turkey U21	2	(1)
2012	Turkey B	6	(0)
- * Club domestic league appearances and goals as of 1 October 2023

Ali Kuçik (born 17 June 1991) is a Turkish footballer who plays for TFF Second League club 68 Aksaray Belediyespor. He made a Süper Lig appearance at the age of 18.

== Career ==
Kuçik began his footballing career at Yavuz Sultan Selim Sport Academy in 2003. He played for Yavuz Sultan Selim for a year and scored 40 goals. Ali Kuçik joined Beşiktaş in 2004. He was promoted to Beşiktaş A2 in 2006. He played as a forward or right-sided winger. He was so successful that he was called to Beşiktaş A team by Ertuğrul Sağlam in 2008. He signed a professional contract with Beşiktaş on 3 January 2008.

He played his first official game for Beşiktaş on 5 January 2008 against Diskispor at The Turkish Cup (Turkish: Türkiye Kupası) replacing İbrahim Üzülmez for the last 20 minutes.

Ali Kuçik played for Beşiktaş A2 between 2007 and 2010 at Turkey Football Federation A2 League. He played for 89 games, scoring 43.

Ali Kuçik signed a contract extension on 18 January 2010 and was promoted to Beşiktaş A team by Bernd Schuster.

He played his first game for Beşiktaş against FC Porto in the UEFA Europa League. His debut for Beşiktaş in the Turkish Super League was on 28 November 2010 against Galatasaray replacing Filip Hološko. He was first fielded by Bernd Schuster for Beşiktaş first 11 on 5 December 2010 against Bursaspor. On 19 December 2010 he scored his first goal for Besiktas in the Turkish Süper Lig in the match against Gaziantepspor.

== National Team Career ==
Ali Kuçik first capped for Turkey U-16 on 12 September 2006 against Russia U-16. He won Aegean U-16 cup with Turkey in January 2007. He also won Viktor Bannikov Cup with Turkey U-16 in June 2007. In August 2007, he won second place at the Blacksea Games, losing final on penalties. He was capped for Turkey U-16 for 15 times, scoring 4 goals.

He first represented Turkey U-17 in 2008 against England U-17. In total he played for Turkey U-17 for 15 times, scoring 3 goals.

Ali Kuçik first capped for Turkey U-18 on 2 December 2008 against France U-18. He then capped for Turkey U-18 for 11 times, scoring 3 goals.

Ali Kuçik then first capped for Turkey U-19 on 11 August 2009 against Ukraine U-19. He was capped for Turkey U-19 for 9 times in total.

He was also capped for Turkey U-20 first time in August 2010 at Labonovski Football Tournament in Kiev.

PS.: Despite many web sides refers him as a defender, Ali Kuçik has never played as a defender. He was mainly used as a striker, or occasionally as a right sided winger/forward.
