= Soner Ergençay =

Turkish footballer

Personal information
- Full name: Soner Ergençay
- Date of birth: 25 August 1988 (age 38)
- Place of birth: Urla, Turkey
- Height: 1.80 m (5 ft 11 in)
- Position: Left winger

Youth career
- 2007: Beşiktaş A2

Senior career*
Years	Team	Apps	(Gls)
2010–11	Balıkesirspor	7	(0)
- * Club domestic league appearances and goals

Soner Ergençay (born 25 August 1988 in Urla) is a Turkish professional footballer. He currently plays as left winger for Balıkesirspor in the Turkish Second League. He started his career with Beşiktaş A2 and also played for İstanbulspor and Eyüpspor.

His loan contract will end on 31 May 2011 by his profile in Turkey Football Federation.
