= Ekrem Dağ =

Austrian footballer (born 1980)

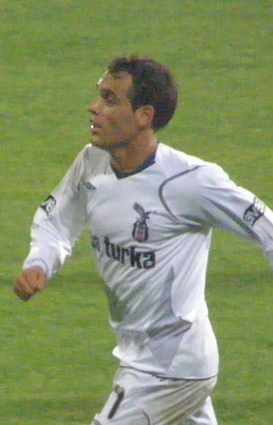

Personal information
- Full name: Ekrem Hayyam Dağ
- Date of birth: 5 December 1980 (age 45)
- Place of birth: Mardin, Turkey
- Height: 1.76 m (5 ft 9 in)
- Position: Midfielder

Youth career
- 1995–1997: SVL Flavia Solva
- 1997–2001: SK Sturm Graz

Senior career*
Years	Team	Apps	(Gls)
2001–2005	SK Sturm Graz	95	(10)
2005–2008	Gaziantepspor	82	(7)
2008–2012	Beşiktaş	88	(5)
2012–2014	Gaziantepspor	46	(1)
2014–2016	Şanlıurfaspor	54	(1)
2017	SV Pachern	0	(0)

International career
2010–2011	Austria	10	(0)

Managerial career
- 2017–2019: SV Fladnitz
- 2019–2021: İstanbul Başakşehir (assistant)
- 2022–2023: Göztepe
- * Club domestic league appearances and goals

Ekrem Hayyam Dağ (born 5 December 1980) is a football coach and a former player. Born in Turkey, he played for the Austria national team.

== Club career ==
Dağ started his career at SVL Flavia Solva but joined the youth team of SK Sturm Graz in 1997 where he made his professional debut four years later. In the summer of 2005 he returned to the land of his birth and signed for Gaziantepspor. In the summer of 2008, after three seasons in Gaziantep, Dağ signed in summer 2008 for Beşiktaş J.K. On 28 July Besiktas canceled his contract with permission of Dağ himself. In July 2012 Ekrem joined his former club Gaziantepspor.

=== Position ===
Dağ is an all-rounder and has played as right back, winger, right midfielder or in the left midfield.

== International career ==
Dağ was born in Turkey but came to Austria with his family when he was 8 years old. His father was a Gastarbeiter. Dağ grew up in Leibnitz and holds Austrian and Turkish dual nationality, making him eligible for both countries. Dağ chose Austria over Turkey, and was due to make his debut on 31 May 2009; however this dream was stopped by injury. Dağ was called up to the Austria national team again on 10 October 2009 for the game against Lithuania, but was an unused substitute. His first cap eventually came in a friendly against Denmark on 3 March 2010. Austria won the match 2–1.

== Honours ==
Beşiktaş

- Süper Lig: 2008–09
- Turkish Cup: 2008–09, 2010–11
