= Onur Bayramoğlu =

Turkish footballer (born 1990)

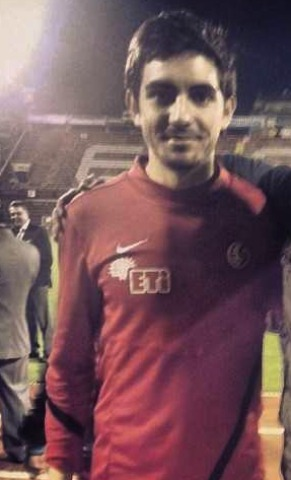

Personal information
- Full name: Emir Onur Bayramoğlu
- Date of birth: January 4, 1990 (age 36)
- Place of birth: Eskişehir, Turkey
- Height: 1.87 m (6 ft 2 in)
- Position: Midfielder

Team information
- Current team: Eskişehirspor
- Number: 8

Youth career
- 2001–2008: DSİ Bentspor

Senior career*
Years	Team	Apps	(Gls)
2008–2009	Bozüyükspor	17	(2)
2009–2012	Beşiktaş	12	(0)
2012–2013	Gençlerbirliği	3	(0)
2013	→ Karşıyaka (loan)	2	(0)
2013–2016	Eskişehirspor	20	(1)
2013–2014	→ Bozüyükspor (loan)	15	(2)
2016–2017	Ankaragücü	11	(0)
2017	Pendikspor	9	(1)
2017–2018	Kahramanmaraşspor	4	(0)
2019–	Eskişehirspor	45	(3)

International career
2009	Turkey U19	2	(0)
2010	Turkey U20	2	(0)
- * Club domestic league appearances and goals as of 11 October 2024

Onur Bayramoğlu (born 4 January 1990) is a Turkish professional footballer who plays for Eskişehirspor.

== Early career ==
He grew up in a sporty family, as father was a former footballer and national table tennis player, his mother was volleyball player. He began his football career in 2001 at Eskişehir DSİ Bentspor. In 2008, he signed for Bozüyükspor who play in the Turkish second tier, and played 17 games, scoring 2 goals, during 2008–2009 season. His manager İsmail Ertekin likened his playing style to that of Kaká.

== Beşiktaş ==
On 4 August 2009 he signed a 5-year contract with Beşiktaş.

== International career ==
Bayramoğlu has represented Turkey at youth level. He played his first game for Turkey U19 on 25 March 2009, against Russia.

== Honours ==
Beşiktaş

- Turkish Cup : 2010-11
