= Volkan Ekici =

Turkish professional footballer

Personal information
- Full name: Volkan Ekici
- Date of birth: March 23, 1991 (age 35)
- Place of birth: Lünen, Germany
- Position: Central midfielder

Team information
- Current team: Lüner SV
- Number: 10

Youth career
- 2000–2010: Borussia Dortmund
- 2010–2011: Beşiktaş A2

Senior career*
Years	Team	Apps	(Gls)
2010–2012	Beşiktaş	1	(0)
2011	→ Kartal (loan)	0	(0)
2012–2013	Göztepe	1	(0)
2013	Fortuna Düsseldorf II	10	(1)
2013–2014	SV Rödinghausen		
2014–	Lüner SV		
- * Club domestic league appearances and goals as of 30 June 2012

Volkan Ekici (born 23 March 1991 in Lünen, North Rhine-Westphalia, Germany) is a Turkish professional footballer who currently plays as a midfielder for Lüner SV of the Landesliga 3 Westfalen in Germany.

== Life and career ==
Ekici began his career with Borussia Dortmund in 2000. He was transferred to Beşiktaş J.K. in 2010. He made his professional debut on 21 May 2011 against Gaziantepspor.

On 16 August 2011, he joined Kartalspor on a loan for the 2011-12 campaign but his contract was mutually terminated on 11 January 2012 without having played for the first team at all. On 16 January 2012, he was released from his contract with Beşiktaş as well and on 31 January 2012, he joined Göztepe on a 3.5-year deal.
