= 2020–21 Beşiktaş J.K. season =

Beşiktaş J.K.
2020–21 season
- President: Ahmet Nur Çebi
- Head coach: Sergen Yalçın
- Stadium: Vodafone Park
- Süper Lig: 1st
- Turkish Cup: Winners
- UEFA Champions League: Second qualifying round
- UEFA Europa League: Third qualifying round
- Top goalscorer: League: Cyle Larin (19); All: Cyle Larin (23)
Home colours	Away colours	Third colours

The 2020–21 Beşiktaş J.K. season was the club's 117th season in existence and the club's 61st consecutive season in the top flight of Turkish football. In addition to the domestic league, Beşiktaş participated in this season's editions of the Turkish Cup, the UEFA Champions League, and the UEFA Europa League. This season covered the period from 1 August 2020 to 30 June 2021.

== Season events ==
On 1 August, Lille announced the signing of Burak Yılmaz.

On 12 August, Beşiktaş announced the signing of Fabrice N'Sakala to a one-year contract, from Alanyaspor.

On 17 August, Beşiktaş announced the signing of Bernard Mensah on a one-year loan deal from Kayserispor.

On 20 August, Beşiktaş announced the signing of Welinton to a one-year contract, from Alanyaspor.

On 28 August, Beşiktaş announced the signing of Atakan Üner from Altınordu.

On 2 September, Javi Montero joined Beşiktaş on a season-long loan deal from Atlético Madrid.

On 3 September, the Turkish Football Federation announced that all games during the first half of the Süper Lig season, would be played behind closed doors due to the COVID-19 pandemic in Turkey.

On 7 September, Enzo Roco moved to Fatih Karagümrük.

On 14 September, Beşiktaş announced the signing of Josef de Souza from Al-Ahli.

On 18 September, Beşiktaş announced the return of Gökhan Töre from Yeni Malatyaspor.

On 26 September, Beşiktaş announced the return of Vincent Aboubakar from Porto.

On 2 October, Beşiktaş announced the signing of Valentin Rosier on a season-long loan deal from Sporting CP.

On 5 October, Beşiktaş announced the signing of Rachid Ghezzal on a season-long loan deal from Leicester City.

On 1 February, Beşiktaş announced the return of Cenk Tosun on loan for the remainder of the season, and the permanent signing of Bilal Ceylan. Also on the same day Jeremain Lens, Tyler Boyd, Erdoğan Kaya and Güven Yalçın all the left the club on loan, whilst Nicolas Isimat-Mirin's contract was terminated by mutual consent.

== Squad ==
As of match played 18 May 2021

No.	Name	Nationality	Position	Date of birth (age)	Signed from	Signed In	Contract ends	Apps.	Goals
Goalkeepers
30	Ersin Destanoğlu	(Turkey)	GK	1 January 2001 (aged 20)	Academy	2018		45	0
61	Emre Bilgin	(Turkey)	GK	26 February 2004 (aged 17)	Academy	2020		0	0
97	Utku Yuvakuran	(Turkey)	GK	2 November 1997 (aged 23)	Beylerbeyi	2016		20	0
Defenders
2	Valentin Rosier	(France)	DF	19 August 1996 (aged 24)	loan from Sporting CP	2020	2021	37	3
4	Javi Montero	(Spain)	DF	14 January 1999 (aged 22)	loan from Atlético Madrid	2020	2021	17	0
21	Fabrice N'Sakala	(Democratic Republic of the Congo)	DF	21 July 1990 (aged 30)	Alanyaspor	2020	2021	35	1
23	Welinton	(Brazil)	DF	10 April 1989 (aged 32)	Alanyaspor	2020		41	1
24	Domagoj Vida	(Croatia)	DF	29 April 1989 (aged 32)	Dynamo Kyiv	2018		131	15
33	Rıdvan Yılmaz	(Turkey)	DF	21 May 2001 (aged 19)	Academy	2019		29	1
46	Serdar Saatçı	(Turkey)	DF	14 February 2003 (aged 18)	Youth Team	2020		1	0
Midfielders
5	Josef de Souza	(Brazil)	MF	11 February 1989 (aged 32)	Al-Ahli	2020		38	3
7	Georges-Kévin Nkoudou	(France)	MF	13 February 1995 (aged 26)	Tottenham Hotspur	2019	2023	69	12
10	Oğuzhan Özyakup	(Turkey)	MF	23 September 1992 (aged 28)	Arsenal	2012		289	35
13	Atiba Hutchinson	(Canada)	MF	8 February 1983 (aged 38)	PSV Eindhoven	2013		289	23
19	Ajdin Hasić	(Bosnia and Herzegovina)	MF	7 October 2001 (aged 19)	Dinamo Zagreb	2020		13	2
20	Necip Uysal	(Turkey)	MF	24 January 1991 (aged 30)	Academy	2009		362	6
22	Adem Ljajić	(Serbia)	MF	29 September 1991 (aged 29)	Torino	2019		84	18
26	Dorukhan Toköz	(Turkey)	MF	21 May 1996 (aged 24)	Eskişehirspor	2018		71	3
27	Atakan Üner	(Turkey)	MF	16 June 1999 (aged 21)	Altınordu	2020		4	0
28	Bilal Ceylan	(Turkey)	MF	7 September 2003 (aged 17)	Eskişehirspor	2021		0	0
41	Kartal Yılmaz	(Turkey)	MF	4 November 2000 (aged 20)	Academy	2019		9	0
43	Bernard Mensah	(Ghana)	MF	17 October 1994 (aged 26)	loan from Kayserispor	2020	2021	36	4
70	Gökhan Töre	(Turkey)	MF	20 January 1992 (aged 29)	Yeni Malatyaspor	2020		142	22
Strikers
14	Vincent Aboubakar	(Cameroon)	FW	22 January 1992 (aged 29)	Porto	2020	2021	67	35
17	Cyle Larin	(Canada)	FW	17 April 1995 (aged 26)	Orlando City	2018		71	31
18	Rachid Ghezzal	(Algeria)	FW	9 May 1992 (aged 29)	loan from Leicester City	2020	2021	35	7
29	Cenk Tosun	(Turkey)	FW	7 June 1991 (aged 29)	loan from Everton	2021	2021	146	67
40	Almos Kalafat	(Hungary)	FW	4 September 2001 (aged 19)	Academy	2020		0	0
Unregistered
	Douglas	(Brazil)	DF	6 August 1990 (aged 30)	Barcelona	2019	2022	7	0
	Muhayer Oktay	(Turkey)	MF	28 April 1999 (aged 22)	Fortuna Düsseldorf II	2019		3	0
Out on loan
8	Umut Nayir	(Turkey)	FW	28 June 1993 (aged 27)	Osmanlıspor	2018		30	6
9	Güven Yalçın	(Turkey)	FW	18 January 1999 (aged 22)	Bayer Leverkusen	2018		68	16
11	Tyler Boyd	(United States)	MF	30 December 1994 (aged 26)	Vitória de Guimarães	2019	2023	34	4
12	Erdoğan Kaya	(Turkey)	DF	27 March 2001 (aged 20)	Youth Team	2019		5	1
77	Jeremain Lens	(Netherlands)	MF	24 November 1987 (aged 33)	Sunderland	2018		100	12
	Alpay Çelebi	(Turkey)	DF	4 April 1999 (aged 22)	Academy	2017		2	0
	Ahmet Gülay	(Turkey)	DF	13 January 2003 (aged 18)	Academy	2020		0	0
	Kerem Kalafat	(Turkey)	DF	9 March 2001 (aged 20)	Academy	2019		2	0
	Erdem Seçgin	(Turkey)	MF	5 January 2000 (aged 21)	Academy	2018		6	0
	Oguzhan Akgün	(Turkey)	FW	13 July 2001 (aged 19)	Academy	2019		0	0
Players who left during the season
2	Nicolas Isimat-Mirin	(France)	DF	15 November 1991 (aged 29)	PSV Eindhoven	2019		14	0

=== Out on loan ===
Note: Flags indicate national team as defined under FIFA eligibility rules; some limited exceptions apply. Players may hold more than one non-FIFA nationality.

No.	Pos.	Nation	Player
9	FW	TUR	Güven Yalçın (on loan at Lecce until 30 June 2021)
11	MF	USA	Tyler Boyd (on loan at Sivasspor until 30 June 2021)
12	DF	TUR	Erdoğan Kaya (on loan at Turgutluspor until 30 June 2021)
77	MF	NED	Jeremain Lens (on loan at Fatih Karagümrük until 30 June 2021)
—	DF	TUR	Alpay Çelebi (on loan at Alanyaspor until 30 June 2022)
—	DF	TUR	Ahmet Gülay (on loan at Alanyaspor until 30 June 2022)

No.	Pos.	Nation	Player
—	DF	TUR	Kerem Kalafat (on loan at Giresunspor until 30 June 2021)
—	MF	TUR	Mertcan Açıkgöz (on loan at Eyüpspor until 30 June 2022)
—	MF	TUR	Erdem Seçgin (on loan at İnegölspor until 30 June 2021)
—	MF	TUR	Emre Yıldız (at 24 Erzincanspor until 30 June 2021)
—	FW	TUR	Oğuzhan Akgün (on loan at Altınordu until 30 June 2022)
—	FW	TUR	Umut Nayir (at Hajduk Split until 30 June 2021)

== Transfers ==
=== In ===
Date	Position	Nationality	Name	From	Fee	Ref.
12 August 2020	DF	(Democratic Republic of the Congo)	Fabrice N'Sakala	Alanyaspor	Undisclosed	
20 August 2020	DF	(Brazil)	Welinton	Alanyaspor	Undisclosed	
28 August 2020	MF	(Turkey)	Atakan Üner	Altınordu	Undisclosed	
14 September 2020	MF	(Brazil)	Josef de Souza	Al-Ahli	Undisclosed	
18 September 2020	MF	(Turkey)	Gökhan Töre	Yeni Malatyaspor	Undisclosed	
26 September 2020	FW	(Cameroon)	Vincent Aboubakar	Porto	Free	
1 February 2021	MF	(Turkey)	Bilal Ceylan	Eskişehirspor	Undisclosed	

=== Loans in ===
Date from	Position	Nationality	Name	From	Date to	Ref.
17 August 2020	MF	(Ghana)	Bernard Mensah	Kayserispor	End of season	
2 September 2020	DF	(Spain)	Javi Montero	Atlético Madrid	End of season	
2 October 2020	DF	(France)	Valentin Rosier	Sporting CP	End of season	
5 October 2020	DF	(Algeria)	Rachid Ghezzal	Leicester City	End of season	
1 February 2021	FW	(Turkey)	Cenk Tosun	Everton	End of season	

=== Out ===
Date	Position	Nationality	Name	To	Fee	Ref.
1 August 2020	FW	(Turkey)	Burak Yılmaz	Lille	Undisclosed	
6 August 2020	DF	(Turkey)	Gökhan Gönül	Fenerbahçe	Free	
6 August 2020	DF	(Turkey)	Caner Erkin	Fenerbahçe	Free	
13 August 2020	DF	(Turkey)	Fatih Aksoy	Alanyaspor	Undisclosed	
14 August 2020	MF	(Turkey)	Sedat Şahintürk	Adana Demirspor	Undisclosed	
7 September 2020	DF	(Chile)	Enzo Roco	Fatih Karagümrük	Undisclosed	

=== Loans out ===
Date from	Position	Nationality	Name	To	Date to	Ref.
1 February 2021	DF	(Turkey)	Erdoğan Kaya	Turgutluspor	End of season	
1 February 2021	MF	(Netherlands)	Jeremain Lens	Fatih Karagümrük	End of season	
1 February 2021	FW	(Turkey)	Güven Yalçın	Lecce	End of season	
1 February 2021	FW	(United States)	Tyler Boyd	Sivasspor	End of season	

=== Released ===
Date	Position	Nationality	Name	Joined	Date	Ref.
4 August 2020	MF	(Germany)	Oğuzhan Aydoğan	Alemannia Aachen	12 November 2020	
1 February 2021	DF	(France)	Nicolas Isimat-Mirin	Sporting Kansas City	3 February 2021	
30 May 2021	FW	(Cameroon)	Vincent Aboubakar	Al Nassr	8 June 2021	

== Competitions ==
=== Overview ===
Competition	First match	Last match	Starting round	Final position	Record							
Competition	First match	Last match	Starting round	Final position	Pld	W	D	L	GF	GA	GD	Win %
Süper Lig	13 September 2020	15 May 2021	Matchday 1	Winners	40	26	6	8	89	44	+45	65.00
Turkish Cup	17 December 2020	18 May 2021	Fifth round	Winners	5	4	1	0	10	4	+6	80.00
UEFA Champions League	25 August 2020		Second qualifying round	Second qualifying round	1	0	0	1	1	3	−2	0.00
UEFA Europa League	24 September 2020		Third qualifying round	Third qualifying round	1	0	1	0	1	1	+0	0.00
Total					47	30	8	9	101	52	+49	63.83

Last updated: 18 May 2021
Source: Soccerway

=== Süper Lig ===
==== League table ====
Pos	Team	Pld	W	D	L	GF	GA	GD	Pts	Qualification or relegation
1	Beşiktaş (C)	40	26	6	8	89	44	+45	84	Qualification for the Champions League group stage
2	Galatasaray	40	26	6	8	80	36	+44	84	Qualification for the Champions League second qualifying round
3	Fenerbahçe	40	25	7	8	72	41	+31	82	Qualification for the Europa League play-off round
4	Trabzonspor	40	19	14	7	50	37	+13	71	Qualification for the Europa Conference League third qualifying round
5	Sivasspor	40	16	17	7	54	43	+11	65	Qualification for the Europa Conference League second qualifying round

Source: Süper Lig, Soccerway
Rules for classification: 1) Points; 2) Head-to-head points; 3) Head-to-head goal difference; 4) Head-to-head goals scored; 5) Goal difference; 6) Goals scored; 7) Play-off.
(C) Champions

==== Results summary ====
Overall								Home						Away					
Pld	W	D	L	GF	GA	GD	Pts	W	D	L	GF	GA	GD	W	D	L	GF	GA	GD
40	26	6	8	89	44	+45	84	14	3	3	49	14	+35	12	3	5	40	30	+10

Last updated: 15 May 2021.
Source: See Results

==== Results by round ====
Round	1	2	3	4	5	6	7	8	9	10	11	12	13	14	15	16	17	18	19	20	21	22	23	24	25	26	27	28	29	30	31	32	33	34	35	36	37	38	39	40	41	42
Ground	A	H	A	H	B	A	H	A	H	A	H	A	H	A	H	A	H	A	H	A	H	H	A	H	A	B	H	A	H	A	H	A	H	A	H	A	H	A	H	A	H	A
Result	W	D	L	L	B	W	W	L	W	W	W	L	W	W	W	W	W	D	W	W	W	L	D	W	W	B	W	W	W	W	D	L	W	W	D	D	W	W	W	L	L	W
Position	3	5	11	15	18	12	10	12	9	5	4	4	4	4	2	1	1	1	1	1	1	2	3	2	2	2	2	2	1	1	1	1	1	1	1	1	1	1	1	1	1	1

Updated to match(es) played on 15 May 2021. Source: TFF.org
A = Away; H = Home; B = Bye; W = Win; D = Draw; L = Loss

Note: Since the league has been expanded to 21 teams each team will earn a bye twice this season.

==== Matches ====
13 September 2020 1	Trabzonspor	1–3	Beşiktaş	Trabzon
20:00 TRT (UTC+3)	Çörekçi (yellow card) 36'; Flávio (yellow card) 43' (yellow-red card) 63'; Ömür 86'	Report	Boyd 29'; N'Sakala (yellow card) 34'; Welinton (yellow card) 39'; Bernard 63' (pen.); Lens 74'	Stadium: Şenol Güneş Stadium; Attendance: 0 Referee: Ali Şansalan
Note: Match played behind closed doors due to the COVID-19 pandemic in Turkey.

19 September 2020 2	Beşiktaş	1–1	Antalyaspor	Istanbul
19:00 TRT (UTC+3)	Hutchinson (yellow card) 10'; Toköz (yellow card) 27'; Larin 33'; Boyd (yellow card) 62'; Lens (yellow card) 90+1'; Bernard (yellow card) 90+3'	Report	Fredy (yellow card) 45+1'; Sarı (yellow card) 56'; Mukairu (yellow card) 83'; Bayrakdar 85'; Orgill (yellow card) 90'	Stadium: Vodafone Park; Attendance: 0 Referee: Halil Umut Meler
Note: Match played behind closed doors due to the COVID-19 pandemic in Turkey.

27 September 2020 3	Konyaspor	4–1	Beşiktaş	Konya
16:00 TRT (UTC+3)	Shengelia 28', 78', (yellow card) 55'; Jevtović (yellow card) 30'; Cikalleshi (yellow card) 38'; Kravets 63', 84' (pen.); Miya (yellow card) 90+3'	Report	Uysal (yellow card) 40'; Toköz (yellow card) 60'; N'Sakala (yellow card) 77'; Vida (yellow card) 81'; Töre 90+1'	Stadium: Konya Büyükşehir Stadium; Attendance: 0 Referee: Abdulkadir Bitigen
Note: Match played behind closed doors due to the COVID-19 pandemic in Turkey.

4 October 2020 4	Beşiktaş	0–1	Gençlerbirliği	Istanbul
16:00 TRT (UTC+3)	R. Yılmaz (yellow card) 40'; Yalçın (yellow card) 87'	Report	Stancu 8'; Polomat (yellow card) 50'; Sio (yellow card) 87'	Stadium: Vodafone Park; Attendance: 0 Referee: Mete Kalkavan
Note: Match played behind closed doors due to the COVID-19 pandemic in Turkey.

5	Bye

26 October 2020 6	Denizlispor	2–3	Beşiktaş	Denizli
19:00 TRT (UTC+3)	Bakalorz (yellow card) 27'; Yılmaz (yellow card) 39'; Mešanović 76'; Sacko 90+4'	Report	Hutchinson 13'; Toköz (yellow card) 25'; Rosier (yellow card) 35'; Aboubakar 39' (pen.); Larin 48'; Vida (yellow card) 58'; Souza (red card) 67'	Stadium: Denizli Atatürk Stadium; Attendance: 0 Referee: Alper Ulusoy
Note: Match played behind closed doors due to the COVID-19 pandemic in Turkey.

1 November 2020 7	Beşiktaş	1–0	Yeni Malatyaspor	Istanbul
19:00 TRT (UTC+3)	Larin 55', (yellow card) 90+3'; Ghezzal (yellow card) 59'; Hutchinson (yellow card) 65'	Report		Stadium: Vodafone Park; Attendance: 0 Referee: Atilla Karaoglan
Note: Match played behind closed doors due to the COVID-19 pandemic in Turkey.

6 November 2020 8	Gaziantep	3–1	Beşiktaş	Gaziantep
20:00 TRT (UTC+3)	Dicko (yellow card) 24'; Mirallas 44', (yellow card) 90+2'; Demir 63'; Özer 90+7'	Report	Destanoğlu (red card) 56'; Larin 61'; Rosier (yellow card) 90+3'	Stadium: Gaziantep Arena; Attendance: 0 Referee: Yaşar Kemal Uğurlu
Note: Match played behind closed doors due to the COVID-19 pandemic in Turkey.

21 November 2020 9	Beşiktaş	3–2	İstanbul Başakşehir	Istanbul
19:00 TRT (UTC+3)	Hutchinson 44'; Larin (yellow card) 45', (goal) 45+1'; Bernard (yellow card) 58'; Toköz (yellow card) 67'; Aboubakar 72' (pen.)	Report	Bolingoli (yellow card) 42'; Topal (yellow card) 55' (yellow-red card) 70'; Rafael (yellow card) 77'; Gulbrandsen 81', 90+4'; Škrtel (yellow card) 90+6'	Stadium: Vodafone Park; Attendance: 0 Referee: Ümit Öztürk
Note: Match was played behind closed doors due to the COVID-19 pandemic in Turkey.

29 November 2020 10	Fenerbahçe	3–4	Beşiktaş	Istanbul
19:00 TRT (UTC+3)	Tisserand (yellow card) 15'; Cissé 34'; Pelkas (yellow card) 38'; Yandaş (yellow card) 53'; Gustavo (yellow card) 63'; Tufan 68', 90+7' (pen.) (yellow card) 90'; Lemos (yellow card) 90+9'	Report	Aboubakar 4', 20'; Larin (yellow card) 20' (yellow-red card) 50'; Uysal 53'; N'Sakala 88'; Rosier (yellow card) 90'; Souza (yellow card) 90+9'	Stadium: Şükrü Saracoğlu Stadium; Attendance: 0 Referee: Tugay Kaan Numanoğlu
Note: Match was played behind closed doors due to the COVID-19 pandemic in Turkey.

4 December 2020 11	Beşiktaş	3–0	Kasımpaşa	Istanbul
19:30 TRT (UTC+3)	Bernard 45+3'; Hutchinson 68'; Toköz (yellow card) 70'; Aboubakar 75'	Report	Hadergjonaj (red card) 55'	Stadium: Vodafone Park; Attendance: 0 Referee: Bahattin Şimsek
Note: Match was played behind closed doors due to the COVID-19 pandemic in Turkey.

13 December 2020 12	Alanyaspor	2–1	Beşiktaş	Alanya
19:00 TRT (UTC+3)	Bakasetas 26' (pen.), 79'; Babacar (yellow card) 54' (yellow-red card) 82'; Bingöl (yellow card) 57'; Bekiroğlu (yellow card) 89'; Tzavellas (yellow card) 90+7'	Report	Rosier (yellow card) 34'; Ghezzal (yellow card) 70'; Aboubakar 90' (pen.); Montero (yellow card) 90+5'	Stadium: Bahçeşehir Okulları Stadium; Attendance: 0 Referee: Atilla Karaoglan
Note: Match was played behind closed doors due to the COVID-19 pandemic in Turkey.

20 December 2020 13	Beşiktaş	4–0	BB Erzurumspor	Istanbul
19:00 TRT (UTC+3)	Bernard (yellow card) 12'; Uysal (yellow card) 38'; Aboubakar 59' (pen.), 71'; Nkoudou 63'; Vida 69', (yellow card) 78'	Report	Akdağ (yellow card) 36'; Muhammed (yellow card) 80'	Stadium: Vodafone Park; Attendance: 0 Referee: Halil Umut Meler
Note: Match was played behind closed doors due to the COVID-19 pandemic in Turkey.

24 December 2020 14	Ankaragücü	0–1	Beşiktaş	Ankara
19:00 TRT (UTC+3)	Çetin (yellow card) 85'	Report	Vida 61'	Stadium: Eryaman Stadium; Attendance: 0 Referee: Halis Özkahya
Note: Match was played behind closed doors due to the COVID-19 pandemic in Turkey.

28 December 2020 15	Beşiktaş	3–0	Sivasspor	Istanbul
19:00 TRT (UTC+3)	Yalçın 18'; Nkoudou (yellow card) 42'; Larin 84'; Özyakup 90+2'	Report	Arslan (yellow card) 45+5' (yellow-red card) 45+5'; Cofie (yellow card) 90'	Stadium: Vodafone Park; Attendance: 0 Referee: Arda Kardeşler
Note: Match was played behind closed doors due to the COVID-19 pandemic in Turkey.

3 January 2021 16	Kayserispor	0–2	Beşiktaş	Kayseri
19:00 TRT (UTC+3)	Kvržić (yellow card) 62'; Lopes (yellow card) 88' (yellow-red card) 90+10'	Report	Mensah (penalty missed) 12'; Welinton (yellow card) 40'; Nkoudou 89' (pen.); Hasić 90+6'	Stadium: Kadir Has Stadium; Attendance: 0 Referee: Fırat Aydınus
Note: Match was played behind closed doors due to the COVID-19 pandemic in Turkey.

6 January 2021 17	Beşiktaş	6–0	Çaykur Rizespor	Istanbul
19:00 TRT (UTC+3)	Larin 19', 31', 79', 83'; Welinton (yellow card) 42'; Souza (yellow card) 44'; Özyakup 56'; Hasić 89'	Report		Stadium: Vodafone Park; Attendance: 0 Referee: Ümit Öztürk
Note: Match was played behind closed doors due to the COVID-19 pandemic in Turkey.

10 January 2021 18	Hatayspor	2–2	Beşiktaş	Antakya
19:00 TRT (UTC+3)	Boupendza 7', 23', (yellow card) 44'; Aabid (yellow card) 44'; Billong (yellow card) 45+3'; Pablo (yellow card) 88'	Report	Aboubakar 6'; Larin 41'; Welinton (yellow card) 84'	Stadium: Antakya Atatürk Stadium; Attendance: 0 Referee: Ali Palabıyık
Note: Match was played behind closed doors due to the COVID-19 pandemic in Turkey.

17 January 2021 19	Beşiktaş	2–0	Galatasaray	Istanbul
19:00 TRT (UTC+3)	Rosier (yellow card) 22'; Ghezzal (yellow card) 64'; Souza 79'; Nkoudou 90+1'	Report	Turan (yellow card) 13'; Çağlayan (yellow card) 34'; Diagne (red card) 58'	Stadium: Vodafone Park; Attendance: 0 Referee: Cuneyt Çakir
Note: Match was played behind closed doors due to the COVID-19 pandemic in Turkey.

21 January 2021 20	Fatih Karagümrük	1–4	Beşiktaş	Istanbul
16:00 TRT (UTC+3)	Altınay (yellow card) 30'; Hedenstad (yellow card) 33'; Borini 78' (pen.)	Report	Aboubakar 44'; Mensah 50', 70'; Larin 66'	Stadium: Atatürk Olympic Stadium; Attendance: 0 Referee: Mete Kalkavan
Note: Match was played behind closed doors due to the COVID-19 pandemic in Turkey.

24 January 2021 21	Beşiktaş	2–1	Göztepe	Istanbul
19:00 TRT (UTC+3)	Ljajić 49'; Rosier (yellow card) 51'; Aboubakar 77'; Destanoğlu (yellow card) 90+4'	Report	Ndiaye (yellow card) 38'; Tripić 39'; Aydoğdu (yellow card) 45+1'; Žulj (yellow card) 45+1'	Stadium: Vodafone Park; Attendance: 0 Referee: Ali Sansalan
Note: Match was played behind closed doors due to the COVID-19 pandemic in Turkey.

31 January 2021 22	Beşiktaş	1–2	Trabzonspor	Istanbul
19:00 TRT (UTC+3)	Aboubakar 29'; Rosier (yellow card) 38'; Toköz (red card) 77'; Ljajić (yellow card) 90'	Report	Ekuban (yellow card) 40'; Montero 44' (o.g.); Ié (yellow card) 45+2'; Vitor Hugo 63'; Baker (yellow card) 90'	Stadium: Vodafone Park; Attendance: 0 Referee: Halil Umut Meler
Note: Match was played behind closed doors due to the COVID-19 pandemic in Turkey.

3 February 2021 23	Antalyaspor	1–1	Beşiktaş	Antalya
19:00 TRT (UTC+3)	Sarı (yellow card) 29' (yellow-red card) 70'; Boffin (yellow card) 36'; Bayrakdar 39'; Naldo (yellow card) 90+1'	Report	Mensah (yellow card) 64'; Vida 73'	Stadium: Antalya Stadium; Attendance: 0 Referee: Alper Ulusoy
Note: Match was played behind closed doors due to the COVID-19 pandemic in Turkey.

7 February 2021 24	Beşiktaş	1–0	Konyaspor	Istanbul
19:00 TRT (UTC+3)	Nsakala (yellow card) 15' (yellow-red card) 21'; Uysal (yellow card) 55'; Rosier 81'; Vida (yellow card) 90'	Report	Jevtović (yellow card) 2'; Çağıran (yellow card) 77'; Skubic (yellow card) 90'	Stadium: Vodafone Park; Attendance: 0 Referee: Halis Özkahya
Note: Match was played behind closed doors due to the COVID-19 pandemic in Turkey.

15 February 2021 25	Gençlerbirliği	0–3	Beşiktaş	Ankara
19:00 TRT (UTC+3)	Ayité (yellow card) 28'; Furman (yellow card) 36'; Candeias (yellow card) 78'	Report	Ghezzal 4'; De Souza (yellow card) 87'; Tosun 89', 90+3'; Toköz (yellow card) 90+7'	Stadium: Eryaman Stadium; Attendance: 0 Referee: Yaşar Kemal Uğurlu
Note: Match was played behind closed doors due to the COVID-19 pandemic in Turkey.

26	Bye

26 February 2021 27	Beşiktaş	3–0	Denizlispor	Istanbul
19:00 TRT (UTC+3)	Larin 22'; Aboubakar 38'; Ljajić 39'	Report	Sagal (yellow card) 54'	Stadium: Vodafone Park; Attendance: 0 Referee: Cüneyt Çakır
Note: Match was played behind closed doors due to the COVID-19 pandemic in Turkey.

2 March 2021 28	Yeni Malatyaspor	0–1	Beşiktaş	Malatya
19:00 TRT (UTC+3)	Tetteh (yellow card) 37'; Chebake (yellow card) 68'	Report	Hutchinson 59'	Stadium: Malatya Arena; Attendance: 0 Referee: Halis Özkahya
Note: Match was played behind closed doors due to the COVID-19 pandemic in Turkey.

6 March 2021 29	Beşiktaş	2–1	Gaziantep	Istanbul
19:00 TRT (UTC+3)	Aboubakar 15', 72'; Welinton (yellow card) 67'	Report	Vetrih (yellow card) 45+2'; Dicko 90' (pen.)	Stadium: Vodafone Park; Attendance: 0 Referee: Mete Kalkavan
Note: Match was played behind closed doors due to the COVID-19 pandemic in Turkey.

12 March 2021 30	İstanbul Başakşehir	2–3	Beşiktaş	Istanbul
19:00 TRT (UTC+3)	Aleksić (yellow card) 46'; Türüç 52'; Kaldırım (yellow card) 61'; Ba 76'; Ciğerci (yellow card) 89'	Report	Larin 42'; Ljajić (yellow card) 61'; Welinton 68'; De Souza 84'	Stadium: Başakşehir Fatih Terim Stadium; Attendance: 0 Referee: Cüneyt Çakır
Note: Match was played behind closed doors due to the COVID-19 pandemic in Turkey.

21 March 2021 31	Beşiktaş	1–1	Fenerbahçe	Istanbul
19:00 TRT (UTC+3)	Larin (yellow card) 35'; Vida 48'; Ghezzal (yellow card) 90+3'	Report	Samatta (yellow card) 31'; Valencia (yellow card) 47'; Aziz (yellow card) 58'; Sosa (yellow card) 79'; Tufan 89'; Pelkas (yellow card) 90+1'	Stadium: Vodafone Park; Attendance: 0 Referee: Halil Umut Meler
Note: Match was played behind closed doors due to the COVID-19 pandemic in Turkey.

4 April 2021 32	Kasımpaşa	1–0	Beşiktaş	Istanbul
19:00 TRT (UTC+3)	Kara 19', (yellow card) 57'; Thelin (penalty missed) 55'; Taşkıran (yellow card) 75'; Tošić (yellow card) 83'	Report	Welinton (yellow card) 89'	Stadium: Recep Tayyip Erdoğan Stadium; Attendance: 0 Referee: Halil Umut Meler
Note: Match was played behind closed doors due to the COVID-19 pandemic in Turkey.

7 April 2021 33	Beşiktaş	3–0	Alanyaspor	Istanbul
19:00 TRT (UTC+3)	Tosun 11'; Hutchinson (yellow card) 26'; Ghezzal 58'; De Souza (yellow card) 74'; Nkoudou 85'	Report	Uçan (yellow card) 23'; Gülselam (yellow card) 53'	Stadium: Vodafone Park; Attendance: 0 Referee: Ümit Öztürk
Note: Match was played behind closed doors due to the COVID-19 pandemic in Turkey.

11 April 2021 34	BB Erzurumspor	2–4	Beşiktaş	Erzurum
19:00 TRT (UTC+3)	Schwechlen 16'; Başsan 39'; Alkılıç (yellow card) 82'	Report	Larin 10'; Özyakup 26'; Toköz (yellow card) 57'; Ghezzal 66'; Töre 86'; Welinton (yellow card) 90+6'	Stadium: Kazım Karabekir Stadium; Attendance: 0 Referee: Yaşar Kemal Uğurlu
Note: Match was played behind closed doors due to the COVID-19 pandemic in Turkey.

16 April 2021 35	Beşiktaş	2–2	Ankaragücü	Istanbul
19:00 TRT (UTC+3)	Nkoudou (penalty missed) 5'; Kulušić 45+4', 52' (o.g.); Töre (yellow card) 90+1'	Report	Geraldo (yellow card) 31'; Paintsil 65' (pen.), 90+3' (pen.); Šarlija (yellow card) 76'	Stadium: Vodafone Park; Attendance: 0 Referee: Halis Özkahya
Note: Match was played behind closed doors due to the COVID-19 pandemic in Turkey.

20 April 2021 36	Sivasspor	0–0	Beşiktaş	Sivas
19:00 TRT (UTC+3)	Claudemir (yellow card) 73'	Report	Welinton (yellow card) 49'; Vida (yellow card) 89'; De Souza (yellow card) 90+8'	Stadium: Sivas Stadium; Attendance: 0 Referee: Fırat Aydınus
Note: Match was played behind closed doors due to the COVID-19 pandemic in Turkey.

24 April 2021 37	Beşiktaş	3–1	Kayserispor	Istanbul
20:30 TRT (UTC+3)	Ghezzal 4' (pen.); Nkoudou 13', 65'; De Souza (yellow card) 32'; Rosier (yellow card) 37'; Uysal (yellow card) 50'; Montero (yellow card) 89'	Report	Pedro Henrique 6', (yellow card) 58'	Stadium: Vodafone Park; Attendance: 0 Referee: Cüneyt Çakır
Note: Match was played behind closed doors due to the COVID-19 pandemic in Turkey.

28 April 2021 38	Çaykur Rizespor	2–3	Beşiktaş	Rize
20:30 TRT (UTC+3)	Pehlivan (yellow card) 72'; Köybaşı 87'; Đoković 89', (yellow card) 90+4'	Report	Nkoudou 16'; Ljajić (yellow card) 36'; Töre 57'; Ghezzal 75'	Stadium: Yeni Rize Şehir Stadium; Attendance: 0 Referee: Abdulkadir Bitigen
Note: Match was played behind closed doors due to the COVID-19 pandemic in Turkey.

1 May 2021 39	Beşiktaş	7–0	Hatayspor	Istanbul
20:30 TRT (UTC+3)	David 2' (o.g.); Larin 11', 14', 55', 65'; Nkoudou 38'; Yılmaz 44'	Report	Canlı (yellow card) 47'; David (yellow card) 75'; Ribeiro (yellow card) 84'	Stadium: Vodafone Park; Attendance: 0 Referee: Ali Palabıyık
Note: Match was played behind closed doors due to the COVID-19 pandemic in Turkey.

8 May 2021 40	Galatasaray	3–1	Beşiktaş	Istanbul
20:30 TRT (UTC+3)	Babel (yellow card) 6', (goal) 11'; Marcão (yellow card) 14'; Donk (yellow card) 40'; Falcao 45+1' (pen.); Onyekuru (yellow card) 63'; Turan 76'	Report	De Souza (yellow card) 30'; Ghezzal 42' (pen.); Nsakala (yellow card) 43'; Hutchinson (yellow card) 44'	Stadium: Türk Telekom Stadium; Attendance: 0 Referee: Cüneyt Çakır
Note: Match was played behind closed doors due to the COVID-19 pandemic in Turkey.

11 May 2021 41	Beşiktaş	1–2	Fatih Karagümrük	Istanbul
20:30 TRT (UTC+3)	Ghezzal (yellow card) 44', (goal) 54'; Welinton (yellow card) 64'	Report	Bertolacci 39', (yellow card) 46'; Zukanović (yellow card) 56' (yellow-red card) 77'; Borini (yellow card) 61', (goal) 80'; Ndao (yellow card) 85'; Ahmetoğlu (yellow card) 90+2'; Castro (yellow card) 90+3'	Stadium: Vodafone Park; Attendance: 0 Referee: Ali Palabıyık
Note: Match was played behind closed doors due to the COVID-19 pandemic in Turkey.

15 May 2021 42	Göztepe	1–2	Beşiktaş	İzmir
20:30 TRT (UTC+3)	Öztürk 24'; Akbunar (yellow card) 42'	Report	Vida 10'; Ghezzal 69' (pen.); Destanoglu (yellow card) 90+4'	Stadium: Gürsel Aksel Stadium; Attendance: 0 Referee: Fırat Aydınus
Note: Match was played behind closed doors due to the COVID-19 pandemic in Turkey.

=== Turkish Cup ===
17 December 2020 Fifth round	Beşiktaş	3–1	Tarsus İdman Yurdu	Istanbul
21:00 TRT (UTC+3)	Yalçın (penalty missed) 12' 56'; Rosier 30'; Larin 39'; Saatçı (yellow card) 90+1'	Report	Çam 80'	Stadium: Vodafone Park; Referee: Yasin Kol

13 January 2021 Sixth round	Beşiktaş	1–0	Çaykur Rizespor	Istanbul
20:45 TRT (UTC+3)	Özyakup (yellow card) 36'; Larin 85'; Yuvakuran (yellow card) 90+3'	Report	Erdoğan (yellow card) 38'	Stadium: Vodafone Park; Referee: Sarper Barış Saka

11 February 2021 Quarter-finals	Konyaspor	1–1 (a.e.t.) (2–3 p)	Beşiktaş	Konya
20:45 TRT (UTC+3)	Bardakçı 18'; Cikalleshi (yellow card) 29'; Shengelia (yellow card) 32'; Çalık (yellow card) 80'	Report	Özyakup 13'; Montero (yellow card) 20'; Uysal (yellow card) 85'	Stadium: Konya Büyükşehir Stadium; Referee: Ali Palabıyık
	Penalties
	Kravets (penalty missed); Guilherme (penalty scored); Skubic (penalty missed); Miya (penalty scored); Bardakçı (penalty missed)		(penalty scored) Ghezzal; (penalty missed) Mensah; (penalty scored) Uysal; (penalty scored) Rosier

16 March 2021 Semi-finals	Beşiktaş	3–2 (a.e.t.)	İstanbul Başakşehir	Istanbul
20:45 TRT (UTC+3)	Aboubakar 17'; Vida 22', (yellow card) 44'; Larin 102'	Report	Türüç 60'; Giuliano 77'	Stadium: Vodafone Park; Referee: Fırat Aydınus

18 May 2021 Final	Antalyaspor	0–2	Beşiktaş	İzmir
20:45 TRT (UTC+3)	Şahin (yellow card) 64'; Kudryashov (yellow card) 73'; Naldo (yellow card) 86'	Report	De Souza 3'; Rosier 30'; Yuvakuran (yellow card) 87'	Stadium: Gürsel Aksel Stadium; Referee: Ali Palabıyık

=== UEFA Champions League ===
==== Qualifying rounds ====
25 August 2020 Second qualifying round	PAOK (Greece)	3–1	(Turkey) Beşiktaş	Thessaloniki, Greece
20:00 CEST (UTC+2)	Tzolis 7', 24'; Michailidis (yellow card) 22'; Pelkas 30', (yellow card) 69'; Ingason (yellow card) 45+1'; El Kaddouri (yellow card) 63'	Report	N'Sakala (yellow card) 11'; Larin 37'	Stadium: Toumba Stadium; Attendance: 0 Referee: Daniele Doveri (Italy)

=== UEFA Europa League ===
==== Qualifying rounds ====
24 September 2020 Third qualifying round	Beşiktaş (Turkey)	1–1 (a.e.t.) (2–4 p)	(Portugal) Rio Ave	Istanbul, Turkey
TRT (UTC+3)	Yalçın 15' Özyakup (yellow card) 19' Montero (yellow card) 72' Uysal (yellow card) 98' Larin (yellow card) 116' Mensah (yellow card) 116'	Report	Augusto (yellow card) 47' Tarantini (yellow card) 74' Moreira 85' (yellow card) 117' Geraldes (yellow card) 88' Aderlan Santos (yellow card) 120+1'	Stadium: Vodafone Park; Attendance: 0 Referee: Daniel Siebert (Germany)
	Penalties
	Mensah (penalty scored); Töre (penalty scored); Welinton (penalty missed); Larin (penalty missed)		(penalty scored) Moreira; (penalty scored) Santos; (penalty scored) Jambor; (penalty scored) Reis

== Squad statistics ==
As of match played 18 May 2021

=== Appearances and goals ===
No.	Pos	Nat	Player	Total		Süper Lig		Turkish Cup		Champions League		Europa League	
No.	Pos	Nat	Player	Apps	Goals	Apps	Goals	Apps	Goals	Apps	Goals	Apps	Goals
2	DF	(France) FRA	Valentin Rosier	37	3	33	1	4	2	0	0	0	0
4	DF	(Spain) ESP	Javi Montero	17	0	9+4	0	3	0	0	0	1	0
5	MF	(Brazil) BRA	Josef de Souza	38	3	32+1	2	2+3	1	0	0	0	0
7	MF	(France) FRA	Georges-Kévin Nkoudou	38	8	15+17	8	4+1	0	1	0	0	0
10	MF	(Turkey) TUR	Oğuzhan Özyakup	25	4	8+11	3	4	1	0+1	0	1	0
13	MF	(Canada) CAN	Atiba Hutchinson	40	4	35+1	4	2+1	0	1	0	0	0
14	FW	(Cameroon) CMR	Vincent Aboubakar	29	16	25+1	15	2+1	1	0	0	0	0
17	FW	(Canada) CAN	Cyle Larin	45	23	33+5	19	2+3	3	1	1	0+1	0
18	FW	(Algeria) ALG	Rachid Ghezzal	35	8	30+1	8	3+1	0	0	0	0	0
19	MF	(Bosnia and Herzegovina) BIH	Ajdin Hasić	13	2	2+6	2	1+3	0	0	0	0+1	0
20	MF	(Turkey) TUR	Necip Uysal	36	1	16+13	1	4+1	0	1	0	1	0
21	DF	(Democratic Republic of the Congo) COD	Fabrice N'Sakala	35	1	26+3	1	4+1	0	1	0	0	0
22	MF	(Serbia) SRB	Adem Ljajić	24	2	14+8	2	0+1	0	0	0	1	0
23	DF	(Brazil) BRA	Welinton	41	1	34+1	1	3+1	0	1	0	1	0
24	DF	(Croatia) CRO	Domagoj Vida	39	6	34	5	4	1	1	0	0	0
26	MF	(Turkey) TUR	Dorukhan Toköz	37	0	13+18	0	3+1	0	0+1	0	1	0
27	MF	(Turkey) TUR	Atakan Üner	4	0	1+2	0	1	0	0	0	0	0
29	FW	(Turkey) TUR	Cenk Tosun	4	3	2+1	3	1	0	0	0	0	0
30	GK	(Turkey) TUR	Ersin Destanoğlu	37	0	35	0	1	0	1	0	0	0
33	DF	(Turkey) TUR	Rıdvan Yılmaz	21	1	13+5	1	1+1	0	0	0	1	0
41	MF	(Turkey) TUR	Kartal Yılmaz	2	0	0+1	0	0+1	0	0	0	0	0
43	MF	(Ghana) GHA	Bernard Mensah	36	4	13+18	4	1+2	0	1	0	0+1	0
46	DF	(Turkey) TUR	Serdar Saatçı	1	0	0	0	0+1	0	0	0	0	0
70	MF	(Turkey) TUR	Gökhan Töre	22	3	5+15	3	0+1	0	0	0	0+1	0
97	GK	(Turkey) TUR	Utku Yuvakuran	11	0	5+1	0	4	0	0	0	1	0
Players out on loan:
8	FW	(Turkey) TUR	Umut Nayir	3	0	0+2	0	0	0	0+1	0	0	0
9	FW	(Turkey) TUR	Güven Yalçın	16	3	3+10	1	1+1	1	0	0	1	1
11	MF	(United States) USA	Tyler Boyd	6	1	4	1	0	0	1	0	1	0
12	DF	(Turkey) TUR	Erdoğan Kaya	1	0	0+1	0	0	0	0	0	0	0
77	MF	(Netherlands) NED	Jeremain Lens	4	1	0+2	1	0	0	1	0	1	0
Players who left Beşiktaş during the season:

=== Goal scorers ===
Place	Position	Nation	Number	Name	Süper Lig	Turkish Cup	Champions League	Europa League	Total
1	FW	(Canada)	17	Cyle Larin	19	3	1	0	23
2	FW	(Cameroon)	14	Vincent Aboubakar	15	1	0	0	16
3	MF	(France)	7	Georges-Kévin Nkoudou	8	0	0	0	8
4	FW	(Algeria)	18	Rachid Ghezzal	8	0	0	0	8
5	DF	(Croatia)	24	Domagoj Vida	5	1	0	0	6
6	MF	(Ghana)	43	Bernard Mensah	4	0	0	0	4
6	MF	(Canada)	13	Atiba Hutchinson	4	0	0	0	4
6	MF	(Turkey)	10	Oğuzhan Özyakup	3	1	0	0	4
9	FW	(Turkey)	29	Cenk Tosun	3	0	0	0	3
9	MF	(Turkey)	70	Gökhan Töre	3	0	0	0	3
9	MF	(Brazil)	5	Josef de Souza	2	1	0	0	3
9	DF	(France)	2	Valentin Rosier	1	2	0	0	3
9	FW	(Turkey)	9	Güven Yalçın	1	1	0	1	3
14	MF	(Bosnia and Herzegovina)	19	Ajdin Hasić	2	0	0	0	2
14	MF	(Serbia)	22	Adem Ljajić	2	0	0	0	2
14				Own goal	3	0	0	0	3
17	MF	(United States)	11	Tyler Boyd	1	0	0	0	1
17	MF	(Netherlands)	77	Jeremain Lens	1	0	0	0	1
17	MF	(Turkey)	20	Necip Uysal	1	0	0	0	1
17	MF	(Turkey)	33	Ridvan Yilmaz	1	0	0	0	1
17	DF	(Democratic Republic of the Congo)	21	Fabrice N'Sakala	1	0	0	0	1
17	DF	(Brazil)	23	Welinton	1	0	0	0	1
				TOTALS	89	10	1	1	101

=== Clean sheets ===
Place	Position	Nation	Number	Name	Süper Lig	Turkish Cup	Champions League	Europa League	Total
1	GK	(Turkey)	30	Ersin Destanoğlu	13	0	0	0	13
2	GK	(Turkey)	97	Utku Yuvakuran	2	2	0	0	4
				TOTALS	15	2	0	0	17

=== Disciplinary record ===
Number	Nation	Position	Name	Süper Lig		Turkish Cup		Champions League		Europa League		Total	
Number	Nation	Position	Name	Yellow card	Red card	Yellow card	Red card	Yellow card	Red card	Yellow card	Red card	Yellow card	Red card
2	(France)	DF	Valentin Rosier	8	0	0	0	0	0	0	0	8	0
4	(Spain)	DF	Javi Montero	2	0	0	0	0	0	1	0	3	0
5	(Brazil)	MF	Josef de Souza	7	1	0	0	0	0	0	0	7	1
7	(France)	MF	Georges-Kévin Nkoudou	1	0	0	0	0	0	0	0	1	0
10	(Turkey)	MF	Oğuzhan Özyakup	0	0	1	0	0	0	1	0	2	0
13	(Canada)	MF	Atiba Hutchinson	4	0	0	0	0	0	0	0	4	0
17	(Canada)	FW	Cyle Larin	5	1	0	0	0	0	1	0	6	1
18	(Algeria)	FW	Rachid Ghezzal	5	0	0	0	0	0	0	0	5	0
20	(Turkey)	MF	Necip Uysal	4	0	1	0	0	0	1	0	6	0
21	(Democratic Republic of the Congo)	DF	Fabrice N'Sakala	5	1	0	0	1	0	0	0	6	1
22	(Serbia)	MF	Adem Ljajić	3	0	0	0	0	0	0	0	3	0
23	(Brazil)	DF	Welinton	9	0	0	0	0	0	0	0	9	0
24	(Croatia)	DF	Domagoj Vida	5	0	1	0	0	0	0	0	6	0
26	(Turkey)	MF	Dorukhan Toköz	7	1	0	0	0	0	0	0	7	1
30	(Turkey)	GK	Ersin Destanoğlu	2	1	0	0	0	0	0	0	2	1
33	(Turkey)	DF	Rıdvan Yılmaz	1	0	0	0	0	0	0	0	1	0
43	(Ghana)	MF	Bernard Mensah	4	0	0	0	0	0	1	0	5	0
46	(Turkey)	DF	Serdar Saatçı	0	0	1	0	0	0	0	0	1	0
70	(Turkey)	MF	Gökhan Töre	1	0	0	0	0	0	0	0	1	0
97	(Turkey)	GK	Utku Yuvakuran	0	0	2	0	0	0	0	0	2	0
Players away on loan:
9	(Turkey)	FW	Güven Yalçın	1	0	0	0	0	0	0	0	1	0
11	(United States)	MF	Tyler Boyd	1	0	0	0	0	0	0	0	1	0
77	(Netherlands)	MF	Jeremain Lens	1	0	0	0	0	0	0	0	1	0
Players who left Beşiktaş during the season:
			TOTALS	76	5	6	0	1	0	5	0	88	5
