= 2019–20 Beşiktaş J.K. season =

Beşiktaş
2019–20 season
- President: Fikret Orman (until 24 September 2019); Ahmet Nur Çebi (from 24 September 2019)
- Head coach: Abdullah Avcı (until 24 January 2020); Sergen Yalçın (from 24 January 2020)
- Stadium: Vodafone Park
- Süper Lig: 3rd
- Turkish Cup: Round of 16
- UEFA Europa League: Group stage
- Top goalscorer: League: Burak Yılmaz (13); All: Burak Yılmaz (14)
Home colours	Away colours	Third colours

The 2019–20 Beşiktaş J.K. season was the club's 116th year since its foundation, 98th season of competitive football and the club's 61st season contesting the Süper Lig, the top division of Turkish football. The season consisted of the period between 1 July 2019 and 25 July 2020.

== Season events ==
On 1 June 2019, Şenol Güneş became manager of the Turkey national team, with Abdullah Avcı taking over in his place.

On 19 March, the Turkish Football Federation suspended all football due to the COVID-19 pandemic.

On 4 May, Loris Karius announced that he had terminated his loan deal with Beşiktaş.

On 13 May, the Turkish Football Federation announced that the Süper Lig would resume on 12 June.

== Squad ==
As of match played 25 July 2020

No.	Name	Nationality	Position	Date of birth (age)	Signed from	Signed In	Contract ends	Apps.	Goals
Goalkeepers
30	Ersin Destanoğlu	(Turkey)	GK	1 January 2001 (aged 19)	Academy	2018		8	0
97	Utku Yuvakuran	(Turkey)	GK	2 November 1997 (aged 22)	Beylerbeyi	2016		9	0
Defenders
3	Enzo Roco	(Chile)	DF	16 August 1992 (aged 27)	Cruz Azul	2018		27	2
4	Víctor Ruiz	(Spain)	DF	25 January 1989 (aged 31)	Villarreal	2019	2022	26	0
5	Douglas	(Brazil)	DF	6 August 1990 (aged 29)	Barcelona	2019	2022	7	0
12	Erdoğan Kaya	(Turkey)	DF	27 March 2001 (aged 19)	Youth Team	2019		4	1
24	Domagoj Vida	(Croatia)	DF	29 April 1989 (aged 31)	Dynamo Kyiv	2018		92	9
33	Rıdvan Yılmaz	(Turkey)	DF	21 May 2001 (aged 19)	Academy	2019		8	0
34	Kerem Kalafat	(Turkey)	DF	9 March 2001 (aged 19)	Academy	2019		2	0
77	Gökhan Gönül	(Turkey)	DF	4 January 1985 (aged 35)	Fenerbahçe	2016		140	9
88	Caner Erkin	(Turkey)	DF	4 October 1988 (aged 31)	Internazionale	2017		120	6
Midfielders
13	Atiba Hutchinson	(Canada)	MF	8 February 1983 (aged 37)	PSV Eindhoven	2013		249	19
15	Mohamed Elneny	(Egypt)	MF	11 July 1992 (aged 28)	loan from Arsenal	2019	2020	36	1
19	Georges-Kévin Nkoudou	(France)	MF	13 February 1995 (aged 25)	Tottenham Hotspur	2019	2023	31	4
20	Necip Uysal	(Turkey)	MF	24 January 1991 (aged 29)	Academy	2009		326	5
22	Adem Ljajić	(Serbia)	MF	29 September 1991 (aged 28)	Torino	2019		60	16
26	Dorukhan Toköz	(Turkey)	MF	21 May 1996 (aged 24)	Eskişehirspor	2018		34	3
27	Jeremain Lens	(Netherlands)	MF	24 November 1987 (aged 32)	Sunderland	2018		96	11
41	Kartal Yılmaz	(Turkey)	MF	4 November 2000 (aged 19)	Academy	2019		7	0
	Oğuzhan Aydoğan	(Germany)	MF	4 February 1997 (aged 23)	Borussia Dortmund	2016		1	0
Strikers
8	Umut Nayir	(Turkey)	FW	28 June 1993 (aged 27)	Osmanlıspor	2018		27	6
9	Güven Yalçın	(Turkey)	FW	18 January 1999 (aged 21)	Bayer Leverkusen	2018		52	11
11	Tyler Boyd	(United States)	FW	30 December 1994 (aged 25)	Vitória de Guimarães	2019	2023	28	3
17	Burak Yılmaz	(Turkey)	FW	15 July 1985 (aged 35)	Trabzonspor	2019		96	32
40	Almos Kalafat	(Hungary)	FW	4 September 2001 (aged 18)	Academy	2020		0	0
92	Abdoulay Diaby	(Mali)	FW	21 May 1991 (aged 29)	loan from Sporting CP	2019	2020	37	6
99	Kevin-Prince Boateng	(Ghana)	FW	6 March 1987 (aged 33)	loan from Fiorentina	2020	2020	11	3
Out on loan
10	Oğuzhan Özyakup	(Turkey)	MF	23 September 1992 (aged 27)	Arsenal	2012		264	31
14	Fatih Aksoy	(Turkey)	DF	6 November 1997 (aged 22)	Academy	2016		18	0
15	Nicolas Isimat-Mirin	(France)	DF	15 November 1991 (aged 28)	PSV Eindhoven	2019		14	0
21	Muhayer Oktay	(Turkey)	MF	28 April 1999 (aged 21)	Fortuna Düsseldorf II	2019		3	0
41	Alpay Çelebi	(Turkey)	DF	4 April 1999 (aged 21)	Academy	2017		2	0
44	Erdem Seçgin	(Turkey)	MF	5 January 2000 (aged 20)	Academy	2018		6	0
95	Cyle Larin	(Canada)	FW	17 April 1995 (aged 25)	Orlando City	2018		26	8
	Sedat Şahintürk	(Turkey)	MF	7 February 1996 (aged 24)	Academy	2016	2022	2	1
	Oğuzhan Akgün	(Turkey)	FW	13 July 2001 (aged 19)	Academy	2019		0	0
Players who left during the season
1	Loris Karius	(Germany)	GK	22 June 1993 (aged 27)	loan from Liverpool	2018	2020	67	0
6	Gary Medel	(Chile)	DF	3 August 1987 (aged 32)	Internazionale	2017		74	1
7	Ricardo Quaresma	(Portugal)	MF	26 September 1983 (aged 36)	Porto	2015		224	38
14	Orkan Çınar	(Turkey)	MF	29 January 1996 (aged 24)	Gaziantepspor	2017		9	1
23	Pedro Rebocho	(Portugal)	DF	23 January 1995 (aged 25)	loan from Guingamp	2019		17	0
	Aras Özbiliz	(Armenia)	MF	9 March 1990 (aged 30)	Spartak Moscow	2016		5	1

== Transfers ==
=== In ===
Date	Position	Nationality	Name	From	Fee	Ref.
1 July 2019	FW	(Serbia)	Adem Ljajić	Torino	Undisclosed	
15 July 2019	FW	(United States)	Tyler Boyd	Vitória de Guimarães	Undisclosed	
27 July 2019	DF	(Brazil)	Douglas	Barcelona	Undisclosed	
7 August 2019	DF	(Spain)	Víctor Ruiz	Villarreal	Undisclosed	
22 August 2019	MF	(France)	Georges-Kévin Nkoudou	Tottenham Hotspur	Undisclosed	

=== Loans in ===
Date from	Position	Nationality	Name	From	Date to	Ref.
25 August 2018	GK	(Germany)	Loris Karius	Liverpool	4 May 2020	
8 August 2019	DF	(Portugal)	Pedro Rebocho	Guingamp	End of Season	
31 August 2019	MF	(Egypt)	Mohamed Elneny	Arsenal	End of Season	
2 September 2019	FW	(Mali)	Abdoulay Diaby	Sporting CP	End of Season	
31 January 2020	FW	(Ghana)	Kevin-Prince Boateng	Fiorentina	End of Season	

=== Out ===
Date	Position	Nationality	Name	To	Fee	Ref.
29 August 2019	DF	(Chile)	Gary Medel	Bologna	Undisclosed	
29 August 2019	MF	(Portugal)	Ricardo Quaresma	Kasımpaşa	Undisclosed	

=== Loans out ===
Date from	Position	Nationality	Name	To	Date to	Ref.
5 July 2019	FW	(Canada)	Cyle Larin	Zulte Waregem	End of Season	
6 August 2019	DF	(Turkey)	Alpay Çelebi	Kayserispor	End of Season	
21 August 2019	DF	(France)	Nicolas Isimat-Mirin	Toulouse	End of Season	
21 August 2019	FW	(Turkey)	Oguzhan Akgün	İstanbulspor	End of Season	
17 January 2020	MF	(Turkey)	Muhayer Oktay	Giresunspor	End of Season	
29 January 2020	MF	(Turkey)	Oğuzhan Özyakup	Feyenoord	End of Season	
1 March 2020	MF	(Turkey)	Erdem Seçgin	Ümraniyespor	End of Season	

=== Released ===
Date	Position	Nationality	Name	Joined	Date
30 June 2019	GK	(Turkey)	Tolga Zengin		
30 June 2019	DF	(Brazil)	Adriano	Athletico Paranaense	23 July 2019
30 June 2019	MF	(Armenia)	Aras Özbiliz	Pyunik	31 August 2019
30 June 2019	MF	(Turkey)	Gökhan Töre	Yeni Malatyaspor	
30 June 2019	FW	(Turkey)	Mustafa Pektemek	Kasımpaşa	
31 January 2020	MF	(Turkey)	Orkan Çınar	MKE Ankaragücü	
15 July 2020	DF	(Spain)	Víctor Ruiz		

== Friendlies ==
8 January 2020	Beşiktaş	2–0	Mezőkövesdi	Belek, Turkey
17:00 TRT (UTC+3)	Ljajić 11' (pen.); Hutchinson 25'	Report		Stadium: Gloria Sports Arena

11 January 2020	Beşiktaş	2–2	Altınordu	Belek, Turkey
16:30 TRT (UTC+3)	Lens 9'; B.Yılmaz 35'	Report	Karius 12' (o.g.); H.Üner 24'	Stadium: Gloria Sports Arena

== Competitions ==
=== Süper Lig ===
==== League table ====
Pos	Team	Pld	W	D	L	GF	GA	GD	Pts	Qualification or relegation
1	Başakşehir (C)	34	20	9	5	65	34	+31	69	Qualification for the Champions League group stage
2	Trabzonspor (Note: Trabzonspor were banned for 1 season from all UEFA club competitions for either the 2020–21 or 2021–22 seasons by the UEFA Club Financial Control Body on 3 June 2020 due to breaches of the UEFA Financial Fair Play Regulations.)	34	18	11	5	76	42	+34	65	
3	Beşiktaş	34	19	5	10	59	40	+19	62	Qualification for the Champions League second qualifying round
4	Sivasspor	34	17	9	8	55	38	+17	60	Qualification for the Europa League group stage
5	Alanyaspor	34	16	9	9	61	37	+24	57	Qualification for the Europa League third qualifying round

Source: Süper Lig, Soccerway
Rules for classification: 1) Points; 2) Head-to-head points; 3) Head-to-head goal difference; 4) Head-to-head goals scored; 5) Goal difference; 6) Goals scored; 7) Play-off.
(C) Champions

==== Results summary ====
Overall								Home						Away					
Pld	W	D	L	GF	GA	GD	Pts	W	D	L	GF	GA	GD	W	D	L	GF	GA	GD
34	19	5	10	59	40	+19	62	11	3	3	34	16	+18	8	2	7	25	24	+1

Last updated: 25 July 2020.
Source: See Results

==== Results by matchday ====
Round	1	2	3	4	5	6	7	8	9	10	11	12	13	14	15	16	17	18	19	20	21	22	23	24	25	26	27	28	29	30	31	32	33	34
Ground	A	H	H	A	H	A	H	A	H	A	H	A	H	A	H	A	H	H	A	A	H	A	H	A	H	A	H	A	H	A	H	A	H	A
Result	L	W	D	L	D	L	W	D	W	W	W	W	W	W	L	L	W	L	L	W	W	L	D	W	W	D	L	W	W	L	W	W	W	W
Position	16	8	8	13	11	16	12	10	8	8	8	5	3	2	3	5	5	7	7	7	7	7	7	6	5	5	5	5	5	5	4	4	4	3

Updated to match(es) played on 25 July 2020. Source: Positions by round
A = Away; H = Home; W = Win; D = Draw; L = Loss

==== Results ====
17 August 2019 1	Sivasspor	3–0	Beşiktaş	Sivas
21:45 TRT (UTC+3)	Erdal (yellow card) 24'; Yandaş 30' (yellow card) 44'; Yatabaré 54'; Cofie (yellow card) 63'; Arslan (yellow card) 70'; Kılınç 76'	Report	Boyd (yellow card) 45+5'; Ljajić (yellow card) 45+6'; Erkin (yellow card) 65'	Stadium: New Sivas 4 Eylül Stadium; Referee: Mustafa Ogretmenoglu

23 August 2019 2	Beşiktaş	3–0	Göztepe	Istanbul
20:30 TRT (UTC+3)	Yalçın 45+2'; Erkin 54'; Ljajić 59'; Ruiz (yellow card) 73'	Report	Poko (yellow card) 72'	Stadium: Vodafone Park; Referee: Ali Palabıyık

31 August 2019 3	Beşiktaş	1–1	Çaykur Rizespor	Istanbul
21:45 TRT (UTC+3)	Lens (yellow card) 7'; Vida 53'; Toköz (yellow card) 56'; Ljajić (yellow card) 74'; Nkoudou (yellow card) 90+3'; Rebocho (yellow card) 90+3'	Report	Çağlayan 37'; Morozyuk (yellow card) 58'	Stadium: Vodafone Park; Referee: Yasar Ugurlu

14 September 2019 4	Gazişehir Gaziantep	3–2	Beşiktaş	Gaziantep
20:00 TRT (UTC+3)	Twumasi 8' (pen.); Diarra (yellow card) 19'; Güvenç (yellow card) 54'; Vural 58'; Kayode (red card) 75'; Chibsah 79'; Demir (yellow card) 90'; Ceylan (yellow card) 90+4'	Report	Vida (red card) 6'; Ruiz (yellow card) 47'; Ljajić (yellow card) 54'; Elneny (red card) 75'; Nayir 83'; Hutchinson 84'; Erkin (yellow card) 88'; Boyd (yellow card) 90+6'	Stadium: Gaziantep Arena; Referee: Halil Meler

23 September 2019 5	Beşiktaş	1–1	İstanbul Başakşehir	Istanbul
20:00 TRT (UTC+3)	B.Yılmaz (yellow card) 7' (goal) 84' (pen.); Ljajić (yellow card) 34'; Douglas (yellow card) 34'; Uysal (yellow card) 72'	Report	Tekdemir (yellow card) 8'; Uçar (yellow card) 45+2'; Crivelli (yellow card) 51' (goal) 54'; Epureanu (yellow card) 83'; Škrtel (yellow card) 89'	Stadium: Vodafone Park; Referee: Suat Arslanboga

29 September 2019 6	Trabzonspor	4–1	Beşiktaş	Trabzon
19:00 TRT (UTC+3)	Parmak (yellow card) 24'; Toköz 26' (o.g.); Sosa 42'; Mikel (yellow card) 44'; Türkmen (yellow card) 45+4'; Sørloth 64'; Hosseini (yellow card) 75'; Çakır (yellow card) 76'; Novák (yellow card) 86'; Nwakaeme 88'	Report	Toköz (yellow card) 33'; Uysal (yellow card) 36'; Gönül (yellow card) 75'; Yalçın 79'	Stadium: Şenol Güneş Stadium; Referee: Ali Palabıyık

6 October 2019 7	Beşiktaş	2–0	Alanyaspor	Istanbul
16:30 TRT (UTC+3)	B.Yılmaz (yellow card) 19' (goal) 52' (pen.); Lens (yellow card) 28'; Ruiz (yellow card) 39'; Diaby 69'	Report	Bakasetas (yellow card) 53'; Gülselam (yellow card) 65'; Cissé (yellow card) 65'; Tzavellas (yellow card) 86'	Stadium: Vodafone Park; Referee: Arda Kardeşler

19 October 2019 8	Ankaragücü	0–0	Beşiktaş	Ankara
20:00 TRT (UTC+3)	Pinto (yellow card) 23'; Ağçay (yellow card) 74' (yellow-red card) 76'	Report	Erkin (yellow card) 28'; Yalçın (yellow card) 57'; Çınar (yellow card) 83'; Hutchinson (yellow card) 87'	Stadium: Eryaman Stadium; Referee: Ali Simlan

27 October 2019 9	Beşiktaş	1–0	Galatasaray	Istanbul
18:00 TRT (UTC+3)	Nayir 69'; Erkin (yellow card) 77'; Uysal (yellow card) 89'	Report	Babel (yellow card) 54'; Marcão (yellow card) 59'; Mariano (yellow card) 63'	Stadium: Vodafone Park; Referee: Mete Kalkavan

2 November 2019 10	Antalyaspor	1–2	Beşiktaş	Antalya
18:00 TRT (UTC+3)	Öztürk (yellow card) 9'; Mukairu 52' (yellow card) 90+4'; Leschuk (yellow card) 67'	Report	Vida 9'; Diaby 11'; Nayir (yellow card) 48'; Rebocho (yellow card) 69'	Stadium: New Antalya Stadium; Referee: Cüneyt Çakır

10 November 2019 11	Beşiktaş	1–0	Denizlispor	Istanbul
19:00 TRT (UTC+3)	Erkin (yellow card) 18'; Nkoudou 70'; Gönül (yellow card) 83'	Report	Barrow (yellow card) 18'; Sackey (yellow card) 66'	Stadium: Vodafone Park; Referee: Özgür Yankaya

23 November 2019 12	Konyaspor	0–1	Beşiktaş	Konya
20:00 TRT (UTC+3)	Öztorun (yellow card) 46'; Jønsson (yellow card) 78'; Daci (yellow card) 90+3'	Report	Elneny (yellow card) 54'; B.Yılmaz 71'	Stadium: Konya Büyükşehir Stadium; Referee: Firat Aydınus

2 December 2019 13	Beşiktaş	4–1	Kayserispor	Istanbul
20:00 TRT (UTC+3)	Hutchinson 20'; Gönül 30'; Yılmaz 41', 90'; Özyakup (yellow card) 74'; Yalçın (yellow card) 90+3'	Report	Korkmaz (yellow card) 64'; Adebayor 86'	Stadium: Vodafone Park; Referee: Ümit Öztürk

8 December 2019 14	Kasımpaşa	2–3	Beşiktaş	Istanbul
19:00 TRT (UTC+3)	Hafez (red card) 15'; Pektemek 24'; Koita (yellow card) 32' (goal) 56'; Depe (yellow card) 77'; Ben Youssef (yellow card) 90+7'	Report	Hutchinson (yellow card) 33'; Erkin 39'; B.Yılmaz (yellow card) 45+4'; Elneny (yellow card) 58'; Roco (yellow card) 67'; Nayir 71', 90+5'; Gönül (yellow card) 90+1'	Stadium: Recep Tayyip Erdoğan Stadium; Referee: Arda Kardeşler

15 December 2019 15	Beşiktaş	0–2	Yeni Malatyaspor	Istanbul
19:00 TRT (UTC+3)	Erkin (yellow card) 44' (yellow-red card) 90+8'; Ljajić (yellow card) 46'; Lens (yellow card) 80'; Karius (yellow card) 90+8'; Nayir (yellow card) 90+10'	Report	Donald (yellow card) 5'; Chebake (yellow card) 10'; Guilherme (yellow card) 81'; Thievy 85'; Jahović 90+9' (pen.)	Stadium: Vodafone Park; Referee: Yasar Ugurlu

22 December 2019 16	Fenerbahçe	3–1	Beşiktaş	Istanbul
19:00 TRT (UTC+3)	Kruse 23' (pen.); Tufan 32'; Türüç (yellow card) 37'; Muriqi 58'; Aziz (yellow card) 79'	Report	Lens (yellow card) 31'; Erkin (yellow card) 33'; Hutchinson 45+5'; Elneny (yellow card) 77'	Stadium: Şükrü Saracoğlu Stadium; Referee: Cüneyt Çakır

27 December 2019 17	Beşiktaş	4–1	Gençlerbirliği	Istanbul
20:30 TRT (UTC+3)	Vida 49'; Nkoudou 60'; Ruiz (yellow card) 62'; Özyakup 74'; Nayir (yellow card) 77'; Hutchinson 90+1'	Report	Çiftçi (yellow card) 11' (red card) 11'; Ayité 23'; Pehlivan (red card) 36'; Yılmaz (yellow card) 75'; Candeias (yellow card) 75'; Polomat (yellow card) 77'; Touré (yellow card) 88'	Stadium: Vodafone Park; Referee: Fırat Aydınus

19 January 2020 18	Beşiktaş	1–2	Sivasspor	Istanbul
19:00 TRT (UTC+3)	Roco (yellow card) 5'; Ljajić 33'; Elneny (yellow card) 79'	Report	Yesilyurt 7' (yellow card) 78'; Kılınç (yellow card) 32'; Yatabaré 45'; Goiano (yellow card) 47'; Arslan (yellow card) 61'; Çiftçi (red card) 67'; Aksoy (yellow card) 79'; Öztekin (yellow card) 90+6'	Stadium: Vodafone Park; Referee: Ali Şansalan

26 January 2020 19	Göztepe	2–1	Beşiktaş	İzmir
16:00 TRT (UTC+3)	Castro (yellow card) 13'; Akbunar 25'; Borges 45+3'; Aydoğdu (yellow card) 54'; Jerome (yellow card) 77'; Beto (yellow card) 90+4'	Report	B.Yılmaz 38' (pen.); Hutchinson (yellow card) 45+5'; Nkoudou (yellow card) 52'; Uysal (yellow card) 67'; Vida (yellow card) 84'	Stadium: Doğanlar Stadium; Referee: Hüseyin Göçek

1 February 2020 20	Çaykur Rizespor	1–2	Beşiktaş	Rize
17:00 TRT (UTC+3)	Škoda 36'; Diomandé (yellow card) 63'; Görgen (yellow card) 71'; Fernandes (yellow card) 72'	Report	B.Yılmaz 29'; Gönül 79'	Stadium: Yeni Rize Şehir Stadium; Referee: Ümit Öztürk

8 February 2020 21	Beşiktaş	3–0	Gazişehir Gaziantep	Istanbul
17:00 TRT (UTC+3)	Nkoudou (yellow card) 39'; B.Yılmaz 52' (pen.); Gönül (yellow card) 54'; Boateng 70'; Erkin (yellow card) 79'; Lens 90+5'	Report	Kana-Biyik (yellow card) 47'; Özer (yellow card) 88'	Stadium: Vodafone Park; Referee: Alper Ulusoy

14 February 2020 22	İstanbul Başakşehir	1–0	Beşiktaş	Istanbul
20:00 TRT (UTC+3)	Crivelli (yellow card) 19'; Tekdemir (yellow card) 45+1'; Ba 50'; Epureanu (yellow card) 86'	Report	Boateng (yellow card) 9'; Lens (yellow card) 51'; Boyd (yellow card) 85'	Stadium: Başakşehir Fatih Terim Stadium; Referee: Abdulkadir Bitigen

22 February 2020 23	Beşiktaş	2–2	Trabzonspor	Istanbul
20:00 TRT (UTC+3)	Boateng 57'; Vida 64'; Elneny (yellow card) 80'; Uysal (yellow card) 90'	Report	Sørloth 5', 90+1'; Da Costa (yellow card) 16'; Campi (yellow card) 53'	Stadium: Vodafone Park; Referee: Fırat Aydınus

28 February 2020 24	Alanyaspor	1–2	Beşiktaş	Alanya
20:00 TRT (UTC+3)	Fernándes 37'; Siopis (yellow card) 42'	Report	B.Yılmaz 70', 87' (pen.)	Stadium: Bahçeşehir Okulları Stadium; Referee: Halis Özkahya

6 March 2020 25	Beşiktaş	2–1	Ankaragücü	Istanbul
20:00 TRT (UTC+3)	B.Yılmaz 6' (pen.); Lens (yellow card) 41'; Ruiz (yellow card) 47'; Elneny (yellow card) 52'; Ljajić 88'	Report	Orgill (yellow card) 21'; Łukasik (yellow card) 37'; Ağçay (yellow card) 38'; Faty (yellow card) 82'; Michalak (yellow card) 83'; Parlak 90+3' (pen.)	Stadium: Vodafone Park; Referee: Arda Kardeşler

15 March 2020 26	Galatasaray	0–0	Beşiktaş	Istanbul
19:00 TRT (UTC+3)	Mariano (yellow card) 22'	Report	Lens (yellow card) 75'; B.Yılmaz (yellow card) 86'	Stadium: Türk Telekom Stadyumu; Attendance: 0 Referee: Abdulkadir Bitigen
Note: Match was played behind closed doors due to the COVID-19 pandemic.

13 June 2020 27	Beşiktaş	1–2	Antalyaspor	Istanbul
21:00 TRT (UTC+3)	Elneny (yellow card) 32'; Ruiz (yellow card) 64'; Ljajić 68'; Vida (yellow card) 90+1'	Report	Sangaré (yellow card) 12'; Gümüş 15'; Amilton 35'; Sarı (yellow card) 52'; Kudryashov (yellow card) 53'	Stadium: Vodafone Park; Attendance: 0 Referee: Ümit Öztürk
Note: Match originally scheduled for 21 March, but postponed on 19 March due to the COVID-19 pandemic.

20 June 2020 28	Denizlispor	1–5	Beşiktaş	Denizli
21:00 TRT (UTC+3)	Mbamba (yellow card) 45+1'; Estupiñán 53'; Yılmaz (yellow card) 59'	Report	B.Yılmaz 10'; Gönül 60'; Nkoudou 67'; Ljajić 75'; Diaby 78'	Stadium: Denizli Atatürk Stadium; Attendance: 0 Referee: Mete Kalkavan
Note: Match originally scheduled for 5 April, but postponed on 19 March due to the COVID-19 pandemic.

26 June 2020 29	Beşiktaş	3–0	Konyaspor	Istanbul
21:00 TRT (UTC+3)	Vida (yellow card) 33'; B.Yılmaz 40'; Diaby 45+2'; Lens 52'; R.Yılmaz (yellow card) 86'; Boyd (yellow card) 87'	Report	Hadžiahmetović (red card) 15'	Stadium: Vodafone Park; Attendance: 0 Referee: Zorbay Küçük
Note: Match originally scheduled for 11 April, but postponed on 19 March due to the COVID-19 pandemic.

6 July 2020 30	Kayserispor	3–1	Beşiktaş	Kayseri
21:00 TRT (UTC+3)	Acar 51', 83'; Şahin (yellow card) 53'; Kravets 86'	Report	Diaby (yellow card) 47'; Hutchinson 74'	Stadium: Kadir Has Stadium; Attendance: 0 Referee: Arda Kardeşler
Note: Match originally scheduled for 18 April, but postponed on 19 March due to the COVID-19 pandemic.

9 July 2020 31	Beşiktaş	3–2	Kasımpaşa	Istanbul
21:00 TRT (UTC+3)	Boyd 7'; Gönül (yellow card) 33'; Boateng 49'; Hutchinson (yellow card) 63'; Uysal (yellow card) 81'; Yalçın 90'	Report	Koita 21', 29' (yellow card) 40'	Stadium: Vodafone Park; Attendance: 0 Referee: Ali Şansalan
Note: Match originally scheduled for 25 April, but postponed on 19 March due to the COVID-19 pandemic.

13 July 2020 32	Yeni Malatyaspor	0–1	Beşiktaş	Malatya
21:00 TRT (UTC+3)		Report	Erkin 52' (pen.); Nkoudou (yellow card) 80'; Ruiz (yellow card) 85'	Stadium: Malatya Arena; Attendance: 0 Referee: Fırat Aydınus
Note: Match originally scheduled for 2 May, but postponed on 19 March due to the COVID-19 pandemic.

19 July 2020 33	Beşiktaş	2–0	Fenerbahçe	Istanbul
21:00 TRT (UTC+3)	Lens (yellow card) 27'; Gönül (yellow card) 31' (goal) 70'; Vida 63'; Erkin (yellow card) 90'	Report	Muriqi (red card) 25'; Aziz (yellow card) 25'; Falette (yellow card) 81'; Türüç (yellow card) 86'; Ciğerci (yellow card) 88'; Jailson (yellow card) 90'	Stadium: Vodafone Park; Attendance: 0 Referee: Halil Umut Meler
Note: Match originally scheduled for 9 May, but postponed on 19 March due to the COVID-19 pandemic.

25 July 2020 34	Gençlerbirliği	0–3	Beşiktaş	Ankara
21:00 TRT (UTC+3)	Özdemir (yellow card) 9'; Sio (yellow card) 64'	Report	Hutchinson (yellow card) 32' (goal) 52' (pen.); Boyd (yellow card) 41'; Diaby 78'; Elneny 81' (pen.); Destanoğlu (yellow card) 88'	Stadium: Eryaman Stadium; Attendance: 0 Referee: Bahattin Şimşek
Note: Match originally scheduled for 16 May, but postponed on 19 March due to the COVID-19 pandemic.

=== Turkish Cup ===
5 December 2019 Fifth round 1st leg	Beşiktaş	3–0	Erzincanspor	Istanbul
20:45 TRT (UTC+3)	Boyd 25' (yellow card) 57'; Kaya 45+3'; Roco (yellow card) 74'; Nayir 84'; Erkin (yellow card) 90+1'	Report	Canlı (yellow card) 17'; Subaşı (yellow card) 32'	Stadium: Vodafone Park; Referee: Bahattin Şimşek

18 December 2019 Fifth round 2nd leg	Erzincanspor	2–0 (2–3 agg.)	Beşiktaş	Erzincan
13:00 TRT (UTC+3)	Gürbüz (yellow card) 42'; Çakır 45+1'; Öztürk (yellow card) 87'; Şahin 89'	Report	Uysal (yellow card) 79'	Stadium: 13 Şubat Şehir Stadium; Referee: Kutluhan Bilgic

15 January 2020 Round of 16 1st leg	BB Erzurumspor	3–2	Beşiktaş	Erzurum
18:30 TRT (UTC+3)	Ayaroğlu 12'; Çelik (yellow card) 33'; Karakullukçu 67'; Akdağ 90+1' (pen.)	Report	Erkin (yellow card) 34' (goal) 88'; Nkoudou 35' (pen.); Ruiz (yellow card) 90'	Stadium: Kazım Karabekir Stadium; Referee: Koray Gençerler

22 January 2020 Round of 16 2nd leg	Beşiktaş	2–3 (4–6 agg.)	BB Erzurumspor	Istanbul
20:30 TRT (UTC+3)	Elneny (yellow card) 9'; Diaby 33'; B.Yılmaz 64'; Hutchinson (yellow card) 78'	Report	Karakullukçu 1', 72'; Albayrak (yellow card) 44'; Sissoko 67'; Uçar (yellow card) 80'	Stadium: Vodafone Park; Referee: Serkan Tokat

=== UEFA Europa League ===
==== Group stage ====
Pos	Team	Pld	W	D	L	GF	GA	GD	Pts	Qualification
1	(Portugal) Braga	6	4	2	0	15	9	+6	14	Advance to knockout phase
2	(England) Wolverhampton Wanderers	6	4	1	1	11	5	+6	13	Advance to knockout phase
3	(Slovakia) Slovan Bratislava	6	1	1	4	10	13	−3	4	
4	(Turkey) Beşiktaş	6	1	0	5	6	15	−9	3	

Source: UEFA
Rules for classification: Group stage tiebreakers

19 September 2019 1	Slovan Bratislava (Slovakia)	4–2	(Turkey) Beşiktaş	Bratislava, Slovakia
22:00 TRT (UTC+3)	Šporar 14', 58' de Kamps (yellow card) 28'; Ljubičić (yellow card) 84' (goal) 90+3'; Moha 90+4'	Report	Ruiz (yellow card) 8'; Ljajić 29' (pen.) (yellow card) 37'; Bozhikov 45+1' (o.g.)	Stadium: Tehelné pole Attendance: 5,273; Referee: Kristo Tohver (Estonia)

3 October 2019 2	Beşiktaş (Turkey)	0–1	(England) Wolverhampton Wanderers	Istanbul, Turkey
19:55 TRT (UTC+3)	Toköz (yellow card) 31'; Özyakup (yellow card) 90+4'	Report	Jonny (yellow card) 67'; Boly 90+3'	Stadium: Vodafone Park; Attendance: 22,670; Referee: Harald Lechner (Austria)

24 October 2019 3	Beşiktaş (Turkey)	1–2	(Portugal) Braga	Istanbul, Turkey
19:55 TRT (UTC+3)	Roco (yellow card) 30'; Nayir 71'; Boyd (yellow card) 83'	Report	Sequeira (yellow card) 19'; R.Horta 38'; A.Horta (yellow card) 56'; Palhinha (yellow card) 73'; Esgaio (yellow card) 78'; Eduardo 80'; Matheus (yellow card) 88'; Agbo (yellow card) 88'	Stadium: Vodafone Park; Attendance: 20,956; Referee: Alejandro Hernández Hernández (Spain)

7 November 2019 4	Braga (Portugal)	3–1	(Turkey) Beşiktaş	Braga, Portugal
22:00 TRT (UTC+3)	Paulinho 15', 37'; Viana (yellow card) 58'; Eduardo 81'	Report	Roco (yellow card) 18'; Erkin (yellow card) 20'; Boyd 29'; Lens (red card) 44'	Stadium: Estádio Municipal; Attendance: 8,833; Referee: Gediminas Mažeika (Lithuania)

28 November 2019 5	Beşiktaş (Turkey)	2–1	(Slovakia) Slovan Bratislava	Istanbul, Turkey
20:55 TRT (UTC+3)	Uysal (yellow card) 53'; Erkin (yellow card) 63'; Gönül (yellow card) 75'; Roco 76'; Elneny (yellow card) 82'; Ljajić 90+2' (pen.) (yellow card) 90+4'	Report	De Kamps (yellow card) 30'; Daniel 35'; Holman (yellow card) 61'; Ibrahim (yellow card) 78'; Abena (yellow card) 90+1'	Stadium: Vodafone Park; Attendance: 11,526; Referee: Enea Jorgji (Albania)

12 December 2019 6	Wolverhampton Wanderers (England)	4–0	(Turkey) Beşiktaş	Wolverhampton, England
22:00 TRT (UTC+3)	Kilman (yellow card) 40'; Jota 58', 63', 69'; Dendoncker 67'; Cutrone (yellow card) 90+2'	Report	Uysal (yellow card) 56'; Roco (yellow card) 90+2'	Stadium: Molineux Stadium; Attendance: 27,866; Referee: Andris Treimanis (Latvia)

== Squad statistics ==
As of match played 25 July 2020

=== Appearances and goals ===
No.	Pos	Nat	Player	Total		Süper Lig		Turkish Cup		Europa League	
No.	Pos	Nat	Player	Apps	Goals	Apps	Goals	Apps	Goals	Apps	Goals
3	DF	(Chile) CHI	Enzo Roco	17	1	10+1	0	2	0	3+1	1
4	DF	(Spain) ESP	Víctor Ruiz	26	0	23	0	2	0	1	0
5	DF	(Brazil) BRA	Douglas	7	0	3+2	0	0	0	2	0
8	FW	(Turkey) TUR	Umut Nayir	26	6	3+13	4	4	1	4+2	1
9	FW	(Turkey) TUR	Güven Yalçın	30	3	7+14	3	1+2	0	4+2	0
11	FW	(United States) USA	Tyler Boyd	27	3	13+7	1	2+1	1	4	1
12	DF	(Turkey) TUR	Erdoğan Kaya	4	1	0+1	0	2	1	1	0
13	MF	(Canada) CAN	Atiba Hutchinson	32	6	29+1	6	0+1	0	0+1	0
15	MF	(Egypt) EGY	Mohamed Elneny	36	1	27	1	3	0	4+2	0
17	FW	(Turkey) TUR	Burak Yılmaz	27	14	25+1	13	0+1	1	0	0
19	MF	(France) FRA	Georges-Kévin Nkoudou	30	4	18+7	3	2+1	1	1+1	0
20	MF	(Turkey) TUR	Necip Uysal	23	0	6+9	0	3	0	5	0
22	MF	(Serbia) SRB	Adem Ljajić	29	7	17+7	5	1	0	3+1	2
24	DF	(Croatia) CRO	Domagoj Vida	38	5	31	5	1+1	0	5	0
26	MF	(Turkey) TUR	Dorukhan Toköz	9	0	6+1	0	0	0	2	0
27	MF	(Netherlands) NED	Jeremain Lens	29	2	17+6	2	1+1	0	3+1	0
30	GK	(Turkey) TUR	Ersin Destanoğlu	8	0	8	0	0	0	0	0
33	DF	(Turkey) TUR	Rıdvan Yılmaz	7	0	6	0	1	0	0	0
34	DF	(Turkey) TUR	Kerem Kalafat	2	0	0	0	1	0	1	0
41	MF	(Turkey) TUR	Kartal Yılmaz	7	0	0+5	0	0	0	1+1	0
77	DF	(Turkey) TUR	Gökhan Gönül	32	4	29+1	4	1	0	0+1	0
88	DF	(Turkey) TUR	Caner Erkin	37	4	27+3	3	2+1	1	4	0
92	FW	(Mali) MLI	Abdoulay Diaby	37	6	22+9	5	2+1	1	2+1	0
97	GK	(Turkey) TUR	Utku Yuvakuran	4	0	1	0	2	0	1	0
99	FW	(Ghana) GHA	Kevin-Prince Boateng	11	3	6+5	3	0	0	0	0
Players out on loan:
10	MF	(Turkey) TUR	Oğuzhan Özyakup	21	1	4+9	1	3	0	4+1	0
21	MF	(Turkey) TUR	Muhayer Oktay	3	0	0+1	0	2	0	0	0
44	MF	(Turkey) TUR	Erdem Seçgin	5	0	0	0	1+1	0	1+2	0
Players who left Beşiktaş during the season:
1	GK	(Germany) GER	Loris Karius	32	0	25	0	2	0	5	0
6	DF	(Chile) CHI	Gary Medel	2	0	2	0	0	0	0	0
7	MF	(Portugal) POR	Ricardo Quaresma	1	0	1	0	0	0	0	0
14	MF	(Turkey) TUR	Orkan Çınar	4	0	0+3	0	1	0	0	0
23	DF	(Portugal) POR	Pedro Rebocho	17	0	8+1	0	2	0	5+1	0

=== Goal scorers ===
Place	Position	Nation	Number	Name	Süper Lig	Turkish Cup	Europa League	Total
1	FW	(Turkey)	17	Burak Yılmaz	13	1	0	14
2	MF	(Serbia)	22	Adem Ljajić	5	0	2	7
3	MF	(Canada)	13	Atiba Hutchinson	6	0	0	6
3	FW	(Mali)	92	Abdoulay Diaby	5	1	0	6
3	FW	(Turkey)	8	Umut Nayir	4	1	1	6
6	DF	(Croatia)	24	Domagoj Vida	5	0	0	5
7	DF	(Turkey)	77	Gökhan Gönül	4	0	0	4
7	MF	(France)	19	Georges-Kévin Nkoudou	3	1	0	4
7	DF	(Turkey)	88	Caner Erkin	3	1	0	4
10	FW	(Turkey)	9	Güven Yalçın	3	0	0	3
10	FW	(Ghana)	99	Kevin-Prince Boateng	3	0	0	3
10	FW	(United States)	11	Tyler Boyd	1	1	1	3
13	MF	(Netherlands)	27	Jeremain Lens	2	0	0	2
14	MF	(Turkey)	10	Oğuzhan Özyakup	1	0	0	1
14	MF	(Egypt)	15	Mohamed Elneny	1	0	0	1
14	DF	(Turkey)	12	Erdoğan Kaya	0	1	0	1
14	DF	(Chile)	3	Enzo Roco	0	0	1	1
14				Own goal	0	0	1	1
				TOTALS	59	7	6	72

=== Clean sheets ===
Place	Position	Nation	Number	Name	Süper Lig	Turkish Cup	Europa League	Total
1	GK	(Germany)	1	Loris Karius	8	0	0	8
2	GK	(Turkey)	30	Ersin Destanoğlu	4	0	0	4
3	GK	(Turkey)	97	Utku Yuvakuran	0	1	0	1
				TOTALS	12	1	0	13

=== Disciplinary record ===
Number	Nation	Position	Name	Süper Lig		Turkish Cup		Europa League		Total	
Number	Nation	Position	Name	Yellow card	Red card	Yellow card	Red card	Yellow card	Red card	Yellow card	Red card
3	(Chile)	DF	Enzo Roco	2	0	1	0	3	0	6	0
4	(Spain)	DF	Víctor Ruiz	7	0	1	0	1	0	9	0
5	(Brazil)	DF	Douglas	1	0	0	0	0	0	1	0
8	(Turkey)	FW	Umut Nayir	3	0	0	0	0	0	3	0
9	(Turkey)	FW	Güven Yalçın	2	0	0	0	0	0	2	0
11	(United States)	FW	Tyler Boyd	5	0	1	0	1	0	7	0
13	(Canada)	MF	Atiba Hutchinson	5	0	1	0	0	0	6	0
15	(Egypt)	MF	Mohamed Elneny	7	1	1	0	1	0	9	1
17	(Turkey)	FW	Burak Yılmaz	4	0	0	0	0	0	4	0
19	(France)	MF	Georges-Kévin Nkoudou	4	0	0	0	0	0	4	0
20	(Turkey)	MF	Necip Uysal	6	0	1	0	2	0	9	0
22	(Serbia)	MF	Adem Ljajić	5	0	0	0	2	0	7	0
24	(Croatia)	DF	Domagoj Vida	3	1	0	0	0	0	3	1
26	(Turkey)	MF	Dorukhan Toköz	2	0	0	0	1	0	3	0
27	(Netherlands)	MF	Jeremain Lens	8	0	0	0	0	1	8	1
30	(Turkey)	GK	Ersin Destanoğlu	1	0	0	0	0	0	1	0
33	(Turkey)	DF	Rıdvan Yılmaz	1	0	0	0	0	0	1	0
77	(Turkey)	DF	Gökhan Gönül	6	0	0	0	1	0	7	0
88	(Turkey)	DF	Caner Erkin	10	1	2	0	2	0	14	1
92	(Mali)	FW	Abdoulay Diaby	1	0	0	0	0	0	1	0
99	(Ghana)	FW	Kevin-Prince Boateng	1	0	0	0	0	0	1	0
Players away on loan:
10	(Turkey)	MF	Oğuzhan Özyakup	1	0	0	0	1	0	2	0
Players who left Beşiktaş during the season:
1	(Germany)	GK	Loris Karius	1	0	0	0	0	0	1	0
14	(Turkey)	MF	Orkan Çınar	1	0	0	0	0	0	1	0
23	(Portugal)	DF	Pedro Rebocho	2	0	0	0	0	0	2	0
			TOTALS	89	3	8	0	15	1	112	4
