= Kartal Yılmaz =

Turkish footballer

Personal information
- Full name: Kartal Kayra Yılmaz
- Date of birth: 4 November 2000 (age 26)
- Place of birth: İzmit, Turkey
- Height: 1.77 m (5 ft 10 in)
- Position: Defensive midfielder

Team information
- Current team: Beşiktaş
- Number: 8

Youth career
- 2011–2012: KBBKSpor
- 2012–2019: Beşiktaş

Senior career*
Years	Team	Apps	(Gls)
2019–	Beşiktaş	26	(0)
2021–2022	→ Ümraniyespor (loan)	30	(1)
2022–2023	→ Ümraniyespor (loan)	23	(0)
2023–2024	→ Kayserispor (loan)	29	(0)
2024–2025	→ Kayserispor (loan)	33	(3)

International career^{‡}
2021–2022	Turkey U21	7	(0)
- * Club domestic league appearances and goals as of 8 November 2026 ‡ National team caps and goals as of 30 September 2022

Kartal Kayra Yılmaz (born 4 November 2000) is a Turkish professional footballer who plays as a midfielder for Süper Lig club Beşiktaş.

== Professional career ==
Yılmaz is a youth product of the academies of KBBKSpor and Beşiktaş. He signed his first professional contract with Beşiktaş when he played in their U19s in 2019. He made his professional debut with them in a 2-1 Europa League loss to S.C. Braga on 24 October 2019. He joined Ümraniyespor on loan for the 2021-22 season in the TFF First League.

== Career statistics ==
=== Club ===
As of match played 5 March 2026

Appearances and goals by club, season and competition
Club	Season	League			Turkish Cup		Europe		Total	
Club	Season	Division	Apps	Goals	Apps	Goals	Apps	Goals	Apps	Goals
Beşiktaş	2018–19	Süper Lig	0	0	0	0	0	0	0	0
Beşiktaş	2019–20	Süper Lig	5	0	0	0	2 (Note: Appearances in UEFA Europa League)	0	7	0
Beşiktaş	2020–21	Süper Lig	1	0	1	0	0	0	2	0
Beşiktaş	2021–22	Süper Lig	0	0	0	0	0	0	0	0
Beşiktaş	2022–23	Süper Lig	3	0	0	0	—		3	0
Beşiktaş	2023–24	Süper Lig	0	0	0	0	0	0	0	0
Beşiktaş	2024–25	Süper Lig	0	0	0	0	0	0	0	0
Beşiktaş	2025–26	Süper Lig	12	0	4	2	6 (Note: Two appearances in UEFA Europa League, four appearances in UEFA Conference League)	0	22	2
Beşiktaş	Total		21	0	5	2	8	0	34	2
Ümraniyespor (loan)	2020–21	TFF First League	15	0	0	0	—		15	0
Ümraniyespor (loan)	2021–22	TFF First League	30	1	2	0	—		32	1
Ümraniyespor (loan)	2022–23	Süper Lig	23	0	3	0	—		26	0
Kayserispor (loan)	2023–24	Süper Lig	29	0	1	0	—		30	0
Kayserispor (loan)	2024–25	Süper Lig	33	3	0	0	—		33	3
Career total			151	4	11	2	8	0	170	6

== Honours ==
Beşiktaş

- Turkish Super Cup: 2024
