= Fabrice Nsakala =

Footballer (born 1990)

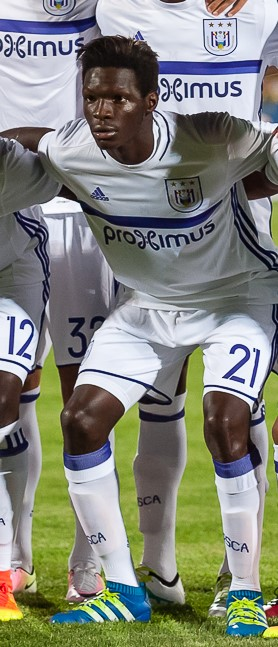
- Nsakala with Anderlecht in 2016

Personal information
- Full name: Fabrice Nsakala Mayélé
- Date of birth: 21 July 1990 (age 36)
- Place of birth: Le Blanc-Mesnil, France
- Height: 1.79 m (5 ft 10 in)
- Positions: Midfielder; defender

Youth career
- 2001–2004: AS Bondy
- 2004–2008: Troyes

Senior career*
Years	Team	Apps	(Gls)
2008–2013	Troyes	95	(0)
2013–2017	Anderlecht	49	(1)
2016–2017	→ Alanyaspor (loan)	27	(0)
2017–2020	Alanyaspor	89	(0)
2020–2022	Beşiktaş	33	(1)
2023–2024	Neuchâtel Xamax	26	(0)
2024–2026	Annecy	26	(0)

International career^{‡}
2006–2007	France U17	5	(0)
2007–2008	France U18	3	(0)
2008–2009	France U19	2	(0)
2011	France U21	1	(0)
2015–	DR Congo	19	(0)
- * Club domestic league appearances and goals as of 11 May 2026 ‡ National team caps and goals as of 08:03, 10 December 2022 (UTC)

Fabrice Nsakala Mayélé (born 21 July 1990) is a professional footballer who plays as a box-to-box midfielder, but is also capable of playing as a left-back or centre-back. He is a former French youth international, having represented his nation at under-17, under-18 under-19, and under-21 levels.

== Club career ==
=== Troyes ===
Born in Le Blanc-Mesnil, Seine-Saint-Denis, Nsakala began his football career at AS Bondy. He spent four years in the club's youth system before departing the Parisian suburbs and joining Troyes in Aube. After excelling in the club's academy and earning youth international caps, Nsakala was called up to the senior team by manager Ludovic Batelli. He made his professional debut on 9 September 2008 in the team's Coupe de la Ligue match against Angers. Nsakala appeared as a substitute in the match with Troyes recording a 2–1 victory. Three days later, he made his league debut in the team's 2–1 defeat to Clermont again appearing as a substitute. On 19 September 2008, Nsakala made his first professional start playing 62 minutes in a 1–0 loss to Lens. He remained a fixture in the first-team for the remainder of the season often in a substitute's role. On 7 March 2009, Nsakala signed his first professional contract agreeing to a three-year deal until June 2012.

For the 2009–10 season, Troyes were relegated to the Championnat National and, despite playing against mostly semi-professional competition, Nsakala only featured in six league matches. The club immediately returned to the second division and Nsakala featured in the team's opening league match of the season against Vannes. He played the entire match in a 1–0 defeat.

=== Anderlecht ===
On 29 August 2013, Nsakala joined Belgian Pro League side Anderlecht for an undisclosed fee and signed a three-year contract.

=== Alanyaspor ===
In July 2017 Nsakala joined Süper Lig club Alanyaspor on a permanent transfer after spending the previous season on loan at the club.

=== Beşiktaş ===
In August 2020, Nsakala joined Beşiktaş in Süper Lig.

=== Neuchâtel Xamax ===
Nsakala joined Neuchâtel Xamax on 19 July 2023.

== International career ==
After some appearances with the French under-17 team, he is selected by Erick Mombaerts as a team of France hopes on 25 August 2011, for an elimination match at Euro 2013 scheduled for 2 September against Latvia. Fabrice will not take part in this match but will know his first selection in hopes on 6 September 2011 in a friendly match against Portugal (entry into play in the 71st minute).

Born in France, Nsakala opted for Congolese national team in the mid-2010s.

== Career statistics ==
As of 28 May 2024

Appearances and goals by club, season and competition
Club	Season	League			National cup		League cup		Europe		Other		Total	
Club	Season	Division	Apps	Goals	Apps	Goals	Apps	Goals	Apps	Goals	Apps	Goals	Apps	Goals
Troyes	2008–09	Ligue 2	13	0	0	0	2	0	—		—		15	0
Troyes	2009–10	Championnat National	6	0	0	0	1	0	—		—		7	0
Troyes	2010–11	Ligue 2	22	0	3	0	0	0	—		—		25	0
Troyes	2011–12	Ligue 2	31	0	2	0	1	0	—		—		34	0
Troyes	2012–13	Ligue 1	22	0	5	0	3	0	—		—		30	0
Troyes	2013–14	Ligue 2	1	0	0	0	1	0	—		—		2	0
Troyes	Total		95	0	10	0	8	0	0	0	0	0	113	0
Anderlecht	2013–14	Belgian Pro League	18	1	1	0	—		6 (Note: Appearances in UEFA Champions League)	0	0	0	25	1
Anderlecht	2014–15	Belgian Pro League	23	0	5	0	—		3	0	1	0	32	0
Anderlecht	2015–16	Belgian Pro League	5	0	1	0	—		3	0	0	0	9	0
Anderlecht	2016–17	Belgian First Division A	2	0	0	0	—		2	0	0	0	4	0
Anderlecht	Total		48	1	7	0	0	0	14	0	1	0	70	1
Alanyaspor (loan)	2016–17	Süper Lig	27	0	0	0	—		0	0	0	0	27	0
Alanyaspor	2017–18	Süper Lig	28	0	1	0	—		0	0	0	0	29	0
Alanyaspor	2018–19	Süper Lig	32	0	5	0	—		0	0	0	0	37	0
Alanyaspor	2019–20	Süper Lig	29	0	5	0	—		0	0	0	0	34	0
Alanyaspor	Total		89	0	11	0	0	0	0	0	0	0	100	0
Beşiktaş	2020–21	Süper Lig	29	1	5	0	—		1	0	0	0	35	1
Beşiktaş	2021–22	Süper Lig	4	0	0	0	—		3	0	0	0	7	0
Beşiktaş	Total		32	1	5	0	0	0	2	0	0	0	39	1
Neuchâtel Xamax	2023–24	Challenge League	26	0	2	0	—		0	0	0	0	28	0
Neuchâtel Xamax	Career total		318	2	33	0	8	0	16	0	1	0	381	2

== Honours ==
Anderlecht

- Belgian Pro League: 2013–14
- Belgian Super Cup: 2014

Beşiktaş

- Süper Lig: 2020–21
- Türkiye Kupası: 2020–21
