= Rudika Vida =

Croatian footballer

Personal information
- Full name: Rudika Vida
- Date of birth: 12 January 1963 (age 63)
- Place of birth: SFR Yugoslavia
- Position: Forward

Senior career*
Years	Team	Apps	(Gls)
1988–1989	Osijek	6	(0)
1993–1994	Belišće	47	(30)
1995	Osijek	13	(0)
1995–1996	Belišće	19	(7)
1996	Osijek	5	(0)
- * Club domestic league appearances and goals

Rudika Vida (born 12 January 1963) is a Croatian retired footballer who played mostly for clubs based in Slavonia.

During his playing days he was known as prolific striker, especially during 1993–94 season when he scored 26 goals.

== Personal life ==
He is the father of the football players Domagoj Vida and Hrvoje Vida.
