= Domagoj Vida =

Croatian footballer (born 1989)

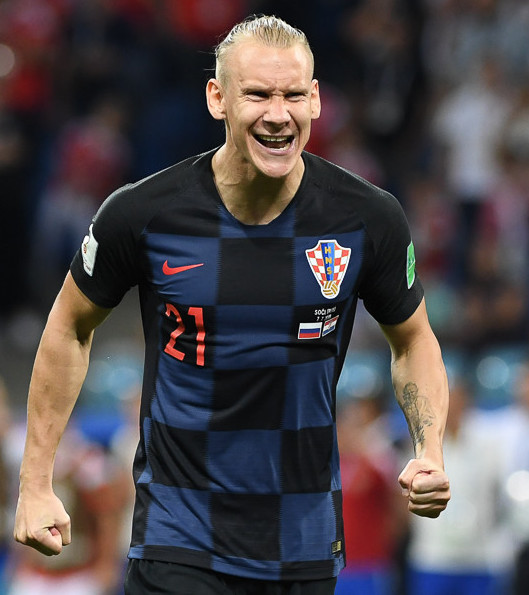
- Vida with Croatia at the 2018 FIFA World Cup

Personal information
- Full name: Domagoj Vida
- Date of birth: 29 April 1989 (age 37)
- Place of birth: Našice, SR Croatia, Yugoslavia
- Height: 1.84 m (6 ft 0 in)
- Position: Centre-back

Team information
- Current team: AEK Athens
- Number: 21

Youth career
- 1996–2003: NK Jedinstvo Donji Miholjac
- 2003–2006: Osijek

Senior career*
Years	Team	Apps	(Gls)
2006–2010	Osijek	90	(6)
2010–2011	Bayer Leverkusen	1	(0)
2011–2013	Dinamo Zagreb	44	(6)
2013–2018	Dynamo Kyiv	105	(10)
2018–2022	Beşiktaş	137	(15)
2022–	AEK Athens	98	(7)

International career
2008	Croatia U19	4	(0)
2007–2009	Croatia U20	10	(1)
2007–2010	Croatia U21	19	(2)
2010–2024	Croatia	105	(4)
Medal record
Men's football
Representing Croatia
FIFA World Cup
Runner-up	2018 Russia
Third place	2022 Qatar
UEFA Nations League
Runner-up	2023 Netherlands
- * Club domestic league appearances and goals as of 1 May 2026

Domagoj Vida (Croatian pronunciation: [dômaɡoj ʋîːda]; born 29 April 1989) is a Croatian professional footballer who plays as a centre-back for Super League Greece club AEK Athens.

Vida was the first Croatian footballer to win a league title in four different European football leagues (with Dinamo Zagreb in Croatia, Dynamo Kyiv in Ukraine, Beşiktaş in Turkey and AEK Athens in Greece).

== Club career ==
=== Youth career ===
Vida has spent his entire youth career in Croatia, rising through the Osijek youth system and being first featured with the senior team in the 2006–07 season, at the age of 17; he then went on to make 12 appearances in the season. In the 2007–08 season, Vida further solidified his credentials, being featured more regularly for his club. He was linked with Croatian champions Dinamo Zagreb.

=== Bayer Leverkusen ===
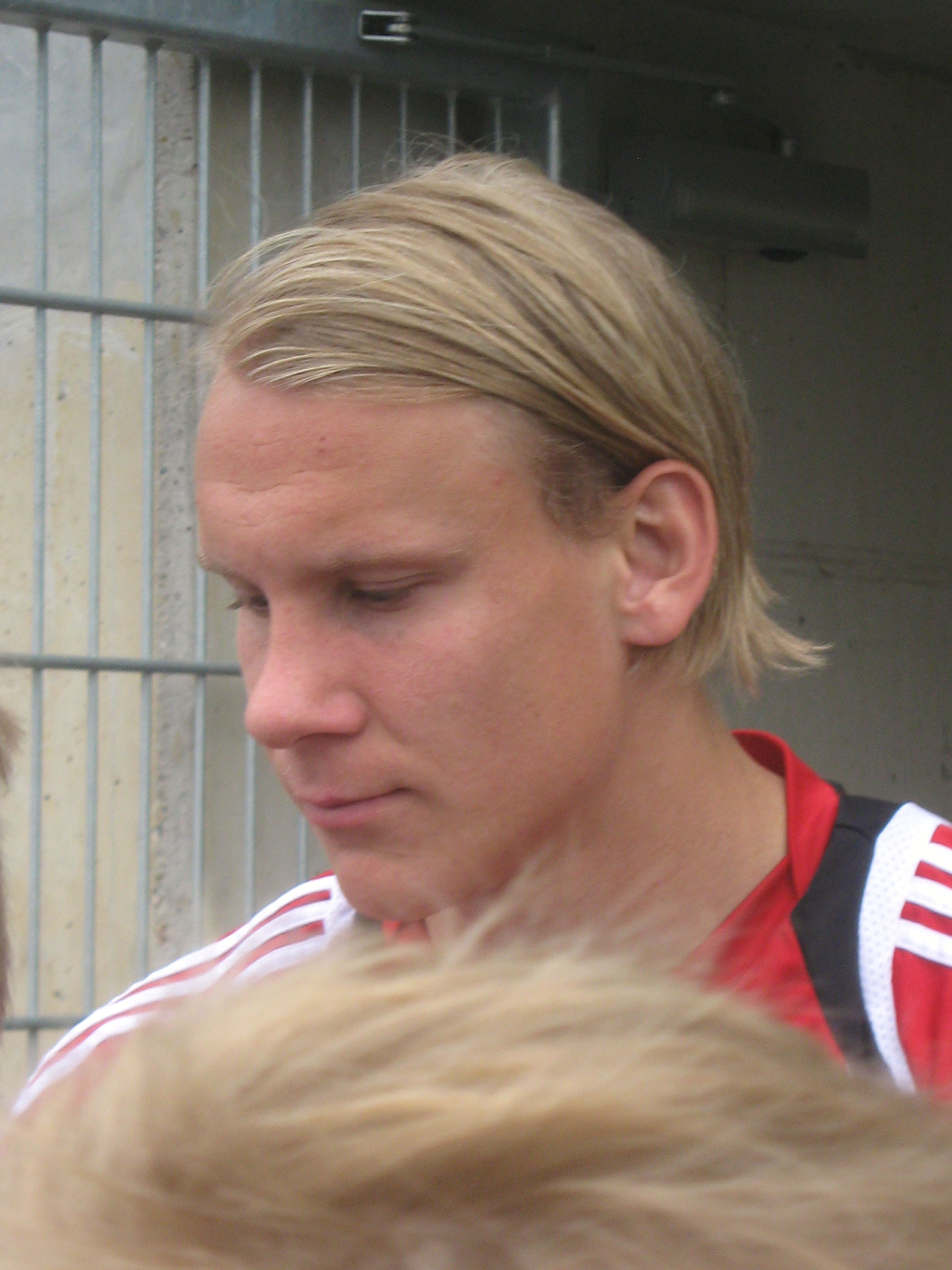
Vida in 2010

On 29 April 2010, Vida signed for German Bundesliga side Bayer Leverkusen. He spent just one season with the club, making a total of eight appearances in the UEFA Europa League. He did not make his Bundesliga debut until 5 March 2011, when he came on as a substitute for the injured Manuel Friedrich in the 14th minute of a 3–0 win at home to VfL Wolfsburg. It turned out to be his only appearance in the league.

=== Dinamo Zagreb ===
On 14 June 2011, it was announced that Vida would join Dinamo Zagreb for an undisclosed fee. In December 2011, Dinamo Zagreb lost 7–1 against Lyon in the Champions League group stage which allowed the French club to progress to the last 16 of the Champions League at the expense of Ajax, who lost 3–0 against Real Madrid. Following media coverage alleging match-fixing which also showed clips of Vida winking after Lyon's fifth goal, UEFA decided not to take action.

On 25 July 2012, Vida scored a 98th–minute goal against Bulgarian side Ludogorets Razgrad in a UEFA Champions League match and thus helped his team to a 3–2 home win, which enabled it to progress to the competition's next round. On 24 September 2012, he was thrown out of the first team and the team bus after he opened up a beer while the team were on their way to a cup match. He also had several altercations with Dinamo head coach Ante Čačić prior to this incident. The next day, it was announced that he would be fined a record €100,000.

=== Dynamo Kyiv ===
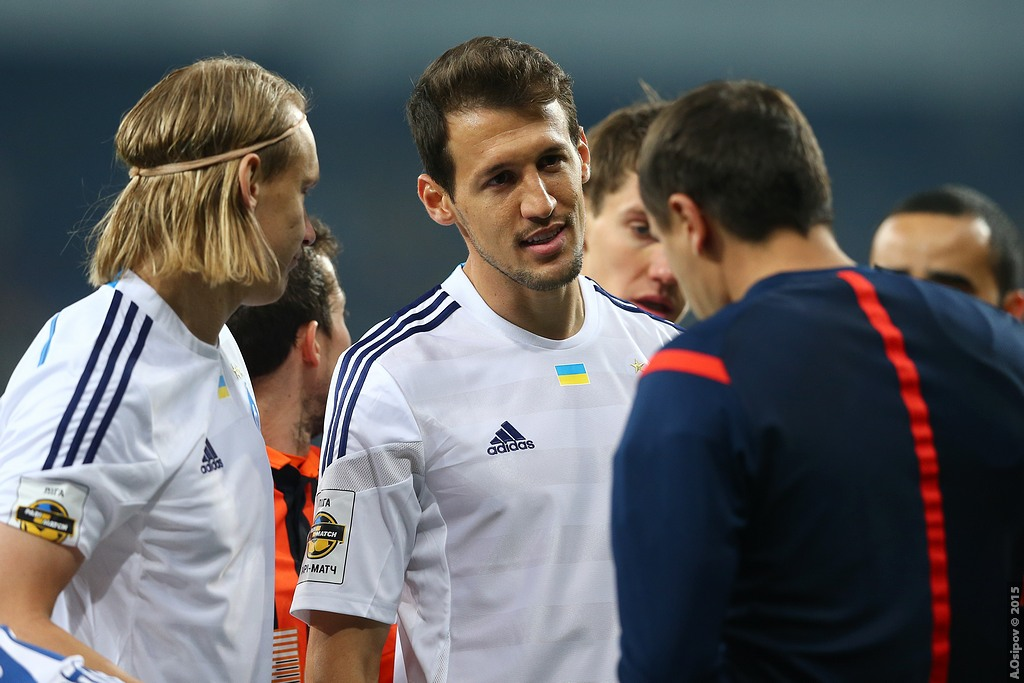
Vida (left) with Dynamo Kyiv in 2015

On 2 January 2013, it was announced that Vida had signed for Ukrainian club Dynamo Kyiv on a five–year deal, for a reported transfer fee of €6 million. On 14 February, he made his debut for Dynamo in a home Europa League match against Bordeaux, which ended 1–1. A week later, he played in the tie's second leg and was unable to help Dynamo get to the round of 16, losing 0–1. In both games, Dynamo head coach Oleh Blokhin used him as a right–back.

On 3 March, Vida played his first game in the Ukrainian Premier League, against Kryvbas Kryvyi Rih. The home 1–1 draw was disappointing for Dynamo, as it made much more difficult for them to get second place and qualify for the Champions League against Dnipro Dnipropetrovsk and Metalist Kharkiv. On 10 March, Vida played his second league match for Dynamo, against Volyn Lutsk; it ended 2–0 and was Dynamo's first victory in 2013. That match was notable because Oleh Blokhin used Vida for the first time as a central defender, partnered with Yevhen Khacheridi, as the first three games for Dynamo he played as a right defender. On 17 March, Vida scored his first goal for Dynamo early in the game against Vorskla Poltava after a corner kick taken by Andriy Yarmolenko, by an excellent header, having forestalled Pavlo Rebenok and goalkeeper Serhiy Dolhanskyi. That goal gave Dynamo a 1–0 win.

On 17 May 2015, Vida scored the winning goal against Dnipro Dnipropetrovsk to clinch Dynamo Kyiv their first Ukrainian Premier League title in six years.

=== Beşiktaş ===
On 3 January 2018, Vida moved to Beşiktaş, signing a four-and-a-half-year contract. Vida made his Beşiktaş debut on 21 February 2018, in a 2–1 away win over Antalyaspor. Vida was sent off 16 minutes into his club's UEFA Champions League round of 16 match against Bayern Munich after he fouled Robert Lewandowski. Beşiktaş went on to lose the match 5–0.

=== AEK Athens ===
On 31 July 2022, Vida signed for Greek club AEK Athens. On 20 August 2022, he made his debut in a 3–0 away win over Lamia. On 22 January he scored his first goal in a 2–1 win over Ionikos. Vida scored a last minute header in a 2–2 draw, in a 4–3 aggregate win over Dinamo Zagreb in the UEFA Champions League play-offs scoring past his Croatian national teammate Dominik Livaković. AEK qualified for the Europa League Group stage and Vida played in 5 out of the 6 games. On 5 October 2023 he scored a powerful header against Ajax in a 1–1 draw. He went on to score another header against Panetolikos in the same week, opening the score. On 4 December 2023, Vida scored his 4th goal of the season against Aris, a header assisted by Petros Mantalos. AEK won the game by 1–0.

== International career ==
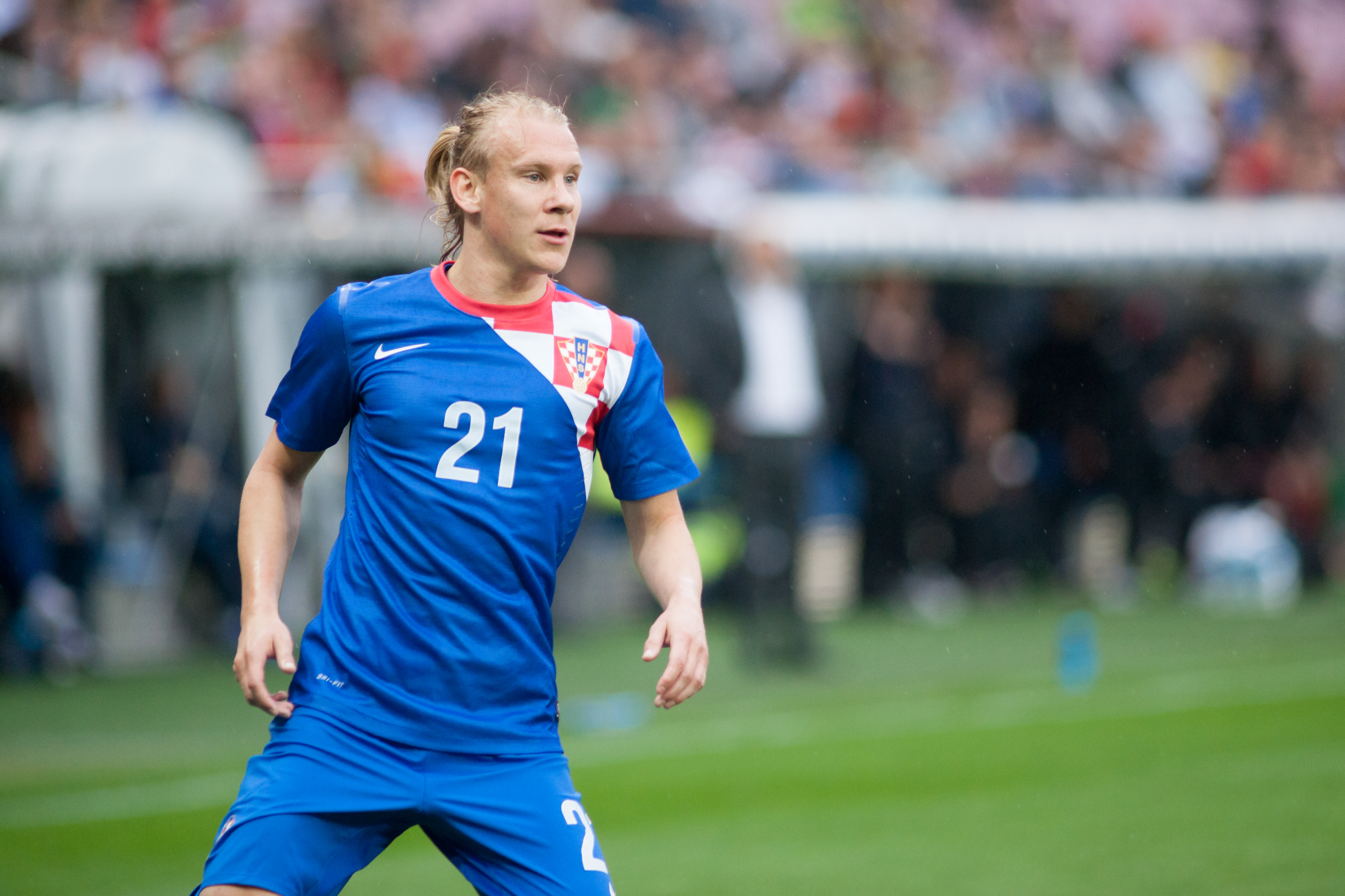
Vida with Croatia in 2013

Vida was an active member of the Croatia national under-21 team.

On 23 May 2010, he made his full international debut in Croatia's 2–0 win against Wales in Osijek, entering as a substitute for Darijo Srna in the 80th minute. Three days later, he played the full 90 minutes in a goalless draw with Estonia.

In 2011, he featured for Croatia in four UEFA Euro 2012 qualifiers, including both play-off matches against Turkey, which saw them secure a place in the finals in Poland and Ukraine. His only appearance at the finals came when he was in the starting lineup for Croatia's final group match, a 1–0 defeat to Spain, after which they were eliminated from the tournament.

On 10 September 2013, Vida scored his first goal for the national side in the 65th minute of a friendly match against South Korea, played at the Jeonju World Cup Stadium in Jeonju.

Vida was a part of the Croatian squad at the 2014 FIFA World Cup tournament in Brazil, but remained an unused substitute as Croatia suffered a group stage exit. He regained his place as a regular during the UEFA Euro 2016 qualifying campaign, making nine appearances, and also appeared in three matches at the finals in France, where the team were eliminated by eventual champions Portugal in the round of 16.

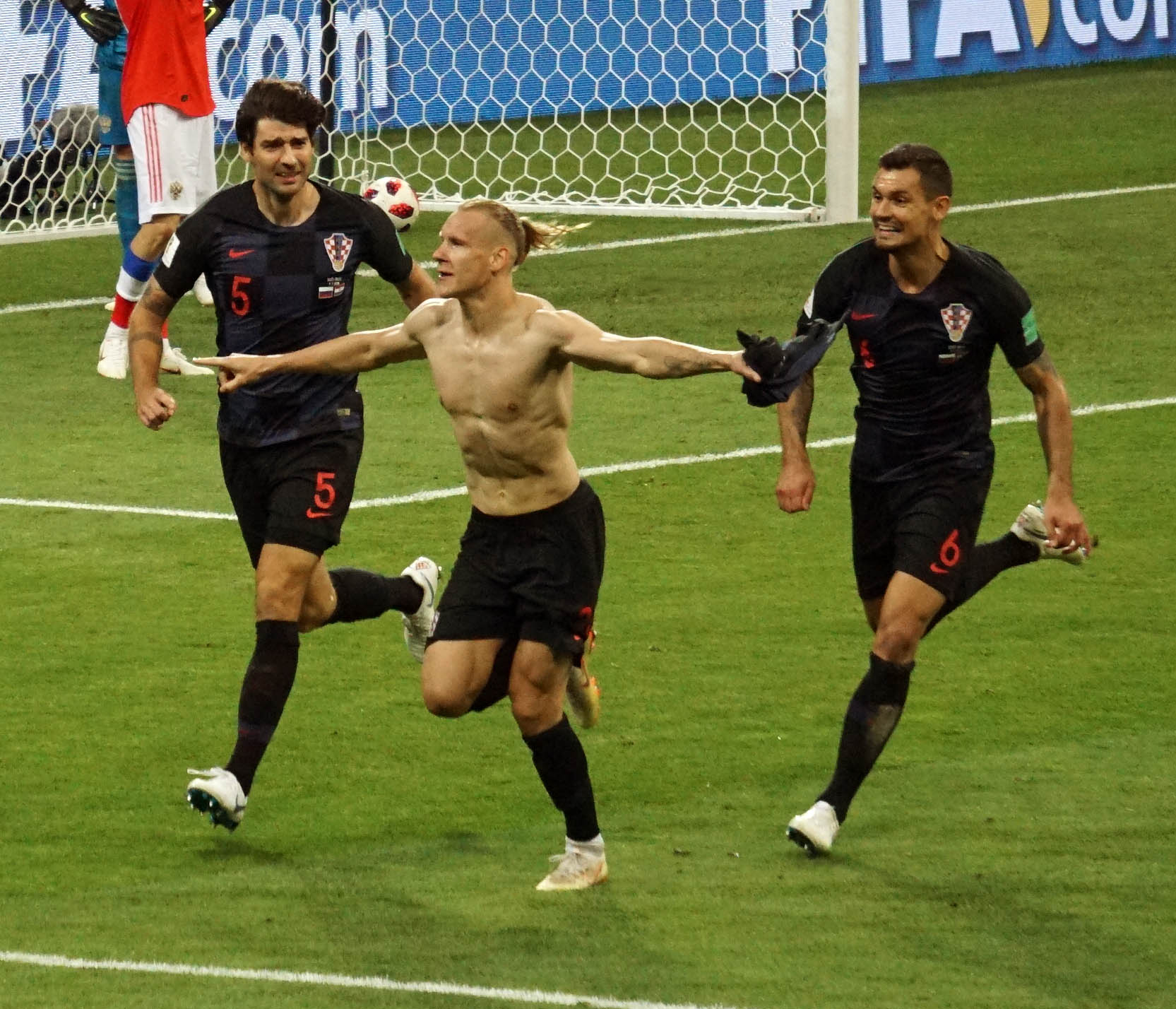
Vida and his Croatian teammates Vedran Ćorluka (left) and Dejan Lovren (right) celebrate after Vida had scored a goal during the 2018 World Cup quarter-final against Russia.

On 3 September 2017, Vida scored the only goal in a 1–0 victory over Kosovo in the World Cup qualification.

In June 2018, he was named in Croatia's final 23-man squad for the 2018 FIFA World Cup in Russia. Vida scored a header in the quarter-final against hosts Russia to give his side a 2–1 lead in extra time. The match finished 2–2, Vida converted his spot kick in the penalty shootout to help his side advance. In the final, he took a free kick from Luka Modrić to set up Ivan Perišić for Croatia's first goal of the match, and picked up a runners-up medal as France eventually defeated his side 4–2.

On 15 October 2018, he captained the national team for the first time and scored in a 2–1 friendly win over Jordan.

On 11 November 2020, he captained the national team once again in a friendly 3–3 draw with Turkey, being at fault for Turkey's first two goals. The same night, after the game, he tested positive for COVID-19 and was left to self-isolate in Istanbul. On 17 May 2021, he was named in Croatia's final squad for the delayed pan-European UEFA Euro 2020 tournament, where Croatia lost to Spain in the round of 16.

On 16 November 2022, he played his 100th match for Croatia in a friendly match against Saudi Arabia. He remained an unused substitute at the 2022 FIFA World Cup in Qatar and UEFA Euro 2024 in Germany. Croatia finished third at the former but had an early exit in the group stage at the latter. He announced international retirement after the Euro, having last cap in a pre-tournament friendly match against North Macedonia.

=== Controversy ===
Vida and Ognjen Vukojević celebrated Croatia's World Cup victory over Russia by shouting "Glory to Ukraine!", a common slogan in Ukraine. FIFA's disciplinary code prohibits political, nationalist and racist slogans in any form. Vida later said: "I like Russian people. It was just a joke." Following Croatia's victory over 2018 World Cup hosts Russia in the quarter-finals, Vida, celebrating the victory with former Croatian international and current assistant coach, Ivica Olić, was recorded saying "Belgrade is burning!" in Croatian. Later it turned out Belgrade was the name of the tavern in Kyiv where they used to hang out. Aleksandar Holiga, editor of Croatian website Telesport, has largely downplayed the incident saying "I don't think Vida understood the full meaning and context of what he was saying. Both of them were just doing it because they are close to Dynamo Kyiv. It's something that fans would chant" and that "politically, Croatia doesn't have a perfect relationship with Russia, but then who does in the rest of Europe?" BBC reported that "Ukrainians accused FIFA of siding with Russia and flooded the football body's Facebook page with declarations of 'Glory to Ukraine'." On 11 July, in an interview in Russian with Russia 24, Vida said that he was mistaken and apologized to Russian people.

== Personal life ==
Domagoj Vida was born in Našice, but grew up in Donji Miholjac in the family of Željka Ursanić and former footballer Rudika Vida.

In 2015, Vida and his fiancée Ivana Gugić welcomed their first child, a baby boy they named David. Vida and Gugić married in Umag in June 2017.

== Career statistics ==
=== Club ===
As of match played 11 September 2025

Appearances and goals by club, season and competition
Club	Season	League			National cup		Europe		Other		Total	
Club	Season	Division	Apps	Goals	Apps	Goals	Apps	Goals	Apps	Goals	Apps	Goals
Osijek	2006–07	Prva HNL	12	0	0	0	–		–		12	0
Osijek	2007–08	Prva HNL	21	0	1	0	–		–		22	0
Osijek	2008–09	Prva HNL	30	2	1	0	–		–		31	2
Osijek	2009–10	Prva HNL	27	4	3	0	–		–		30	4
Osijek	Total		90	6	5	0	–		–		95	6
Bayer Leverkusen	2010–11	Bundesliga	1	0	0	0	8 (Note: Appearance(s) in UEFA Europa League)	0	–		9	0
Dinamo Zagreb	2011–12	Prva HNL	29	2	6	0	12 (Note: Appearances in UEFA Champions League)	0	–		47	2
Dinamo Zagreb	2012–13	Prva HNL	15	4	1	0	12	2	–		28	6
Dinamo Zagreb	Total		44	6	7	0	24	2	–		75	8
Dynamo Kyiv	2012–13	Ukrainian Premier League	12	1	0	0	2	0	–		14	1
Dynamo Kyiv	2013–14	Ukrainian Premier League	17	0	4	1	5	0	–		26	1
Dynamo Kyiv	2014–15	Ukrainian Premier League	20	2	6	0	10	1	1 (Note: Appearance in Ukrainian Super Cup)	0	37	3
Dynamo Kyiv	2015–16	Ukrainian Premier League	18	2	3	0	5	0	1	0	27	2
Dynamo Kyiv	2016–17	Ukrainian Premier League	28	3	4	0	6	0	1	1	39	4
Dynamo Kyiv	2017–18	Ukrainian Premier League	9	2	0	0	8 (Note: Two appearances in UEFA Champions League, six in UEFA Europa League)	0	1	0	18	2
Dynamo Kyiv	Total		104	10	17	1	36	1	4	1	161	13
Beşiktaş	2017–18	Süper Lig	13	1	4	0	1	0	0	0	18	1
Beşiktaş	2018–19	Süper Lig	31	3	0	0	7	0	–		38	3
Beşiktaş	2019–20	Süper Lig	31	5	2	0	5	0	–		38	5
Beşiktaş	2020–21	Süper Lig	34	5	4	1	1	0	–		39	6
Beşiktaş	2021–22	Süper Lig	28	1	1	0	2	0	1 (Note: Appearance in Turkish Super Cup)	0	32	1
Beşiktaş	Total		137	15	11	1	16	0	1	0	165	16
AEK Athens	2022–23	Super League Greece	31	1	2	0	–		–		33	1
AEK Athens	2023–24	Super League Greece	29	6	1	0	9 (Note: Four appearances and one goal in UEFA Champions League, five appearances and one goal in UEFA Europa League)	2	–		39	8
AEK Athens	2024–25	Super League Greece	25	0	1	0	4 (Note: Appearances in UEFA Conference League)	0	–		31	0
AEK Athens	2025–26	Super League Greece	8	0	2	0	6 (Note: Appearance in UEFA Conference League)	1	–		15	1
AEK Athens	Total		93	7	6	0	19	3	–		118	10
Career total			469	44	46	2	103	6	5	1	634	53

=== International ===
Appearances and goals by national team and year
National team	Year	Apps	Goals
Croatia	2010	2	0
Croatia	2011	5	0
Croatia	2012	8	0
Croatia	2013	6	1
Croatia	2014	6	0
Croatia	2015	7	0
Croatia	2016	12	0
Croatia	2017	9	1
Croatia	2018	16	2
Croatia	2019	8	0
Croatia	2020	5	0
Croatia	2021	11	0
Croatia	2022	5	0
Croatia	2023	3	0
Croatia	2024	2	0
Total		105	4

As of match played 3 June 2024
Scores and results list Croatia's goal tally first, score column indicates score after each Vida goal.

List of international goals scored by Domagoj Vida
No	Date	Venue	Cap	Opponent	Score	Result	Competition
1	10 September 2013	Jeonju World Cup Stadium, Jeonju, South Korea	19	South Korea	1–0	2–1	Friendly
2	3 September 2017	Stadion Maksimir, Zagreb, Croatia	50	Kosovo	1–0	1–0	2018 FIFA World Cup qualification
3	7 July 2018	Fisht Olympic Stadium, Sochi, Russia	63	Russia	2–1	2–2	2018 FIFA World Cup
4	15 October 2018	Stadion Rujevica, Rijeka, Croatia	69	Jordan	1–0	2–1	Friendly

== Honours ==
Dinamo Zagreb

- Prva HNL: 2011–12, 2012–13
- Croatian Cup: 2011–12

Dynamo Kyiv

- Ukrainian Premier League: 2014–15, 2015–16
- Ukrainian Cup: 2013–14, 2014–15
- Ukrainian Super Cup: 2016

Beşiktaş

- Süper Lig: 2020–21
- Turkish Cup: 2020–21
- Turkish Super Cup: 2021

AEK Athens

- Super League Greece: 2022–23, 2025–26
- Greek Cup: 2022–23

Croatia

- FIFA World Cup runner-up: 2018; third place: 2022

Orders

- Order of Duke Branimir: 2018

=== Individual ===
- Ukrainian Premier League Centre-back of the Year: 2016–17
- Süper Lig Team of the Season: 2018–19, 2020–21
- Super League Greece Team of the Season: 2023–24

== See also ==
- List of men's footballers with 100 or more international caps
