= Utku Yuvakuran =

Turkish footballer

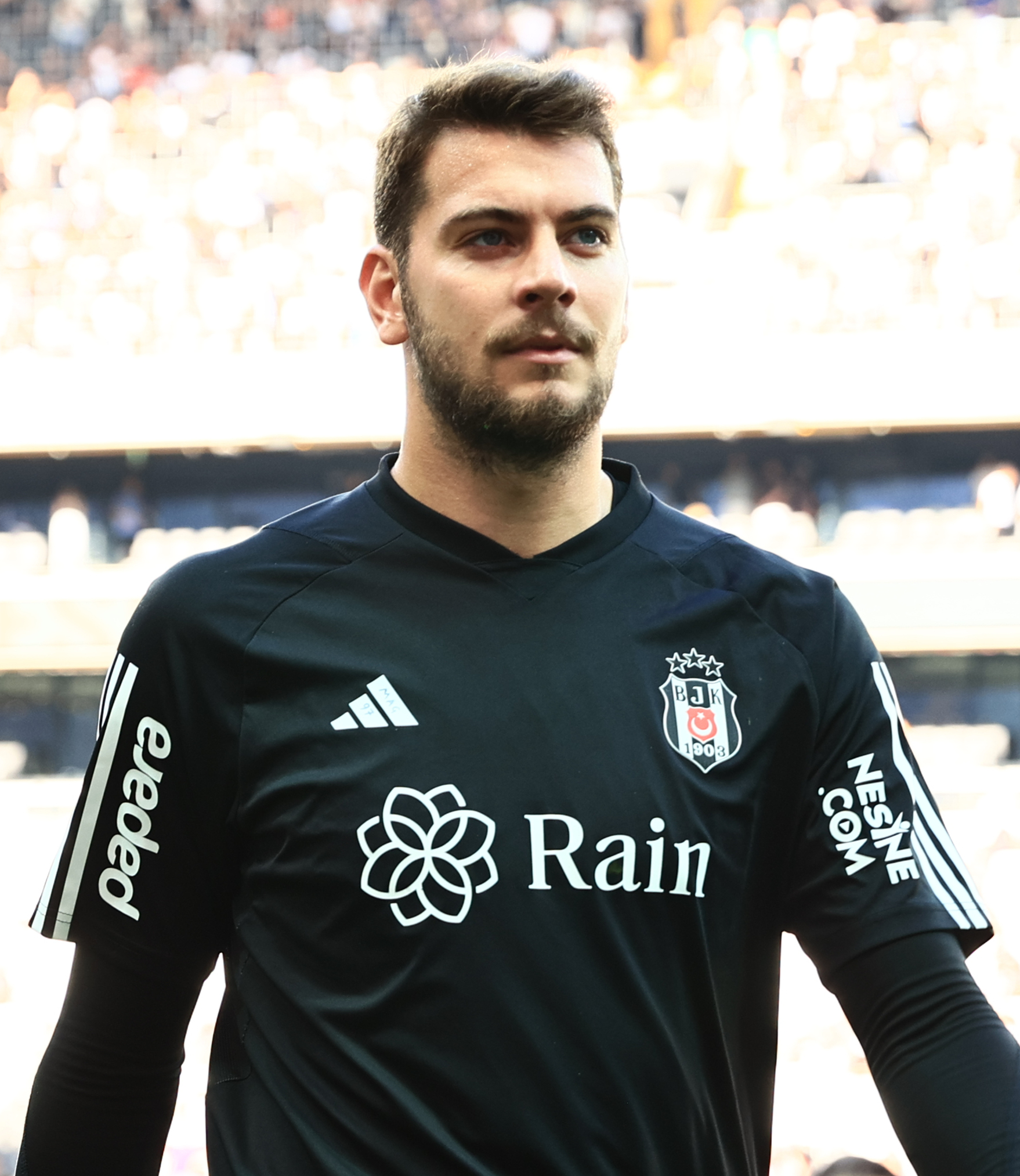
- Yuvakuran with Beşiktaş, 2023

Personal information
- Date of birth: 2 November 1997 (age 29)
- Place of birth: Şişli, Istanbul, Turkey
- Height: 1.92 m (6 ft 4 in)
- Position: Goalkeeper

Team information
- Current team: Pendikspor
- Number: 97

Youth career
- 2008–2011: Beylerbeyi

Senior career*
Years	Team	Apps	(Gls)
2012–2016	Beylerbeyi	35	(0)
2016–2024	Beşiktaş	8	(0)
2017	→ Beylerbeyi (loan)	0	(0)
2021–2022	→ Fatih Karagümrük (loan)	0	(0)
2024–2025	Beykoz Anadolu	33	(0)
2025–	Pendikspor	15	(0)
Total		91	(0)

International career^{‡}
2016	Turkey U19	1	(0)
2015	Turkey U20	1	(0)
- * Club domestic league appearances and goals as of 7 November 2026 ‡ National team caps and goals as of 9 November 2017

Utku Yuvakuran (born 2 November 1997) is a Turkish professional footballer who plays as a goalkeeper for TFF 1. Lig club Pendikspor.

== Professional career ==
Yuvakuran made his professional debut with Beşiktaş in a 1–1 Turkish Cup tie with Kayserispor on 26 January 2017.

He made his Süper Lig debut with Beşiktaş in 26 August 2018 against Antalyaspor in Vodafone Park. Yuvakuran replaced Tolga Zengin in their match against Antalyaspor, because Tolga Zengin's injury. Unfortunately Beşiktaş lost the match as 2-3, on his debut. Yuvakuran made his European debut in the play-off round of 2018-19 UEFA Europa League against Partizan in 30 August 2018. Beşiktaş defeated Partizan in a score of 3–0. During the season when Loris Karius signs with Beşiktaş Yuvakuran became the second goalkeeper.

In the 2020–21 season of the Süper Lig Yuvakuran started as the second goalkeeper in Beşiktaş behind Ersin Destanoğlu. In 24 September 2020, Yuvakuran was the goalkeeper of Beşiktaş in the third qualifying round of 2020-21 UEFA Europa League. They played against Rio Ave in Vodafone Park. The match ended 1–1, but in the penalty shoot-out they lost it as 2–4, eventually Beşiktaş was eliminated. In the tenth week of Süper Lig, in 29 November 2020, Beşiktaş faced Fenerbahçe in Kadıköy. In the absence of Ersin Destanoğlu, Yuvakuran replaced him in the derby. Beşiktaş defeated Fenerbahçe with a score of 3–4. Yuvakuran was the goalkeeper in this historic event, as this was the first away victory for Beşiktaş against Fenerbahçe after 15 years. At the end of the season, Beşiktaş won the title in Süper Lig.

On 31 August 2021, Yuvakuran was loaned to Fatih Karagümrük.

== Personal life ==
Utku is the son of Semih Yuvakuran, a former Turkish international footballer. He is one of three triplets, all of whom are footballers.

== Career statistics ==
As of match played 2 May 2026

Appearances and goals by club, season and competition
Club	Season	League			Cup		Europe		Other		Total	
Club	Season	Division	Apps	Goals	Apps	Goals	Apps	Goals	Apps	Goals	Apps	Goals
Beylerbeyi	2014–15	TFF 3. Lig	0	0	—		—		—		0	0
Beylerbeyi	2015–16	TFF 3. Lig	32	0	1	0	—		3	0	36	0
Beylerbeyi	Total		32	0	1	0	—		3	0	36	0
Beşiktaş	2016–17	Süper Lig	0	0	2	0	0	0	0	0	2	0
Beşiktaş	2017–18	Süper Lig	0	0	1	0	0	0	0	0	1	0
Beşiktaş	2018–19	Süper Lig	1	0	0	0	1	0	—		2	0
Beşiktaş	2019–20	Süper Lig	1	0	2	0	1	0	—		4	0
Beşiktaş	2020–21	Süper Lig	6	0	4	0	1	0	—		11	0
Beşiktaş	2021–22	Süper Lig	0	0	—		—		—		0	0
Beşiktaş	2022–23	Süper Lig	0	0	0	0	—		—		0	0
Beşiktaş	2023–24	Süper Lig	0	0	0	0	0	0	—		0	0
Beşiktaş	Total		8	0	9	0	3	0	0	0	20	0
Fatih Karagümrük (loan)	2021–22	Süper Lig	0	0	2	0	—		—		2	0
Beykoz Anadolu	2024–25	TFF 2. Lig	32	0	0	0	—		1	0	33	0
Pendikspor	2025–26	TFF 1. Lig	7	0	0	0	—		0	0	7	0
Career total			79	0	12	0	3	0	4	0	98	0

== Honours ==
=== Club ===
Beşiktaş J.K.

- Süper Lig: 2016–17, 2020–21
- Türkiye Kupası: 2020–21, 2023–24
