= Atakan Üner =

Turkish footballer

Personal information
- Full name: Hüseyin Atakan Üner
- Date of birth: 16 June 1999 (age 27)
- Place of birth: Denizli, Turkey
- Height: 1.70 m (5 ft 7 in)
- Position: Winger

Team information
- Current team: Somaspor
- Number: 17

Youth career
- 2008–2016: Denizlispor

Senior career*
Years	Team	Apps	(Gls)
2016–2018	Denizlispor	16	(1)
2017	→ Sarayköy (loan)	14	(1)
2018–2020	Altınordu	55	(7)
2020–2023	Beşiktaş	3	(0)
2021	→ Ümraniyespor (loan)	12	(1)
2022	→ Ümraniyespor (loan)	7	(0)
2022	→ Tuzlaspor (loan)	2	(0)
2022-2023	→ Afjet Afyonspor (loan)	30	(4)
2023-2024	Düzcespor	12	(0)
2024–2025	Menemen	5	(0)
2025–	Somaspor	11	(1)

International career
2015	Turkey U16	3	(0)
2016–2017	Turkey U18	3	(0)
2018–2019	Turkey U21	5	(0)
- * Club domestic league appearances and goals as of 2 November 2025

Hüseyin Atakan Üner (born 16 June 1999) is a Turkish professional footballer who plays as a winger for TFF 2. Lig club Somaspor.

== Career ==
A youth product for Denizlispor, Üner moved to Altınordu in 2018, and then to Beşiktaş on 24 August 2020. Üner made his professional debut with Beşiktaş in a 3-1 Süper Lig win over Trabzonspor on 13 September 2020.

On July 21, 2022 Üner moved to First League club Tuzlaspor from Beşiktaş on loan until the end of the 2022-23 season.
