= Ersin Destanoğlu =

Turkish footballer

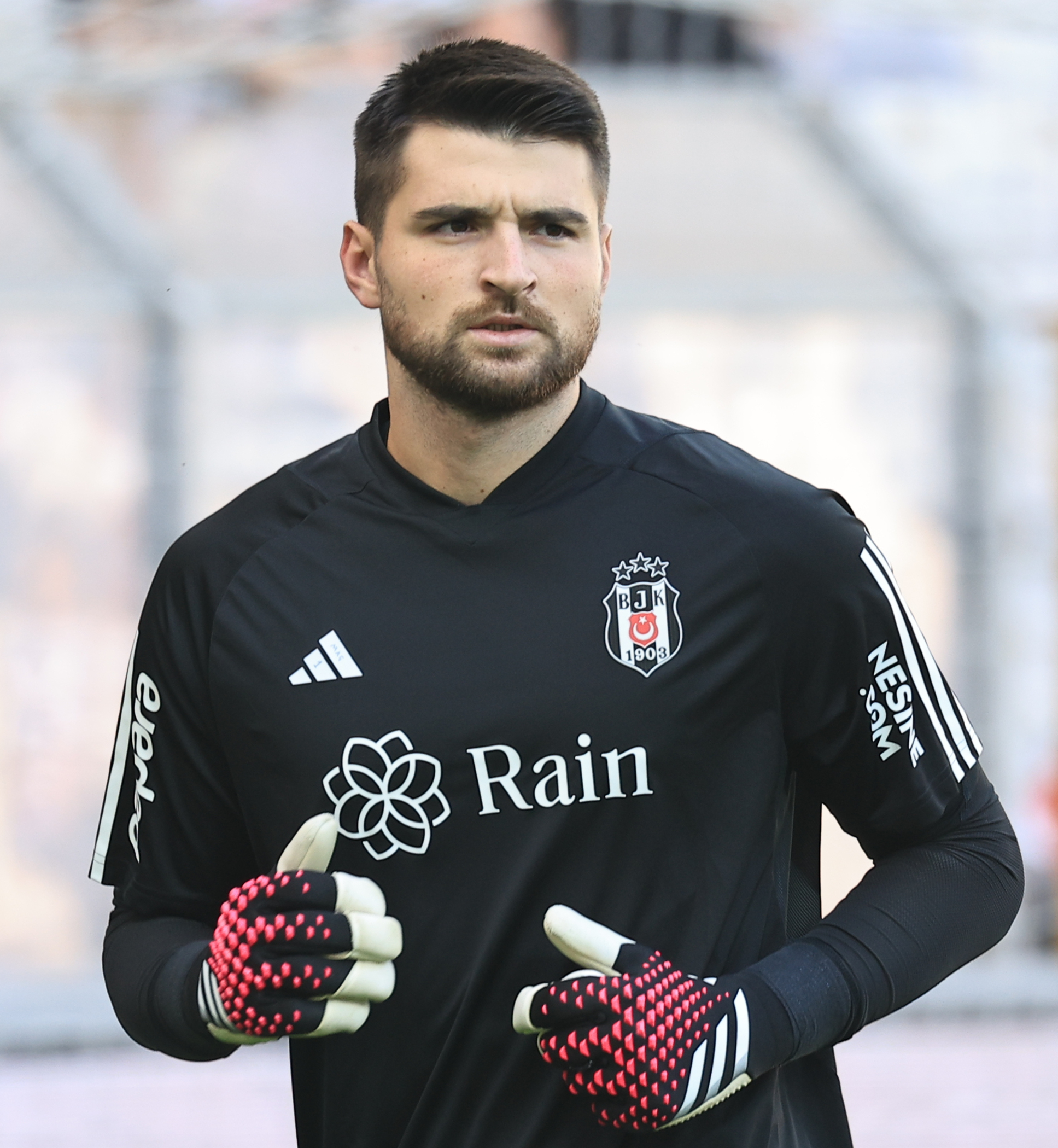

Personal information
- Full name: Ersin Destanoğlu
- Date of birth: 1 January 2001 (age 25)
- Place of birth: Gaziosmanpaşa, Turkey
- Height: 1.95 m (6 ft 5 in)
- Position: Goalkeeper

Team information
- Current team: Al Jazira
- Number: 1

Youth career
- 2012–2013: Bayrampaşaspor
- 2013–2017: Beşiktaş

Senior career*
Years	Team	Apps	(Gls)
2017–2026	Beşiktaş	122	(0)
2026–	Al Jazira	5	(0)

International career^{‡}
2017	Turkey U-16	2	(0)
2017–2018	Turkey U-17	4	(0)
2018–2019	Turkey U-18	3	(0)
2019–2020	Turkey U-19	5	(0)
2020–2022	Turkey U-21	7	(0)
- * Club domestic league appearances and goals as of 10 September 2026 ‡ National team caps and goals as of 25 March 2022

Ersin Destanoğlu (born 1 January 2001) is a Turkish professional footballer who plays as a goalkeeper for UAE Pro League club Al Jazira.

== Club career ==
Destanoğlu played 18 games at 2018–19 season of TFF U-19 Elite Development League. Following the departure of Loris Karius, Destanoğlu became the first choice goalkeeper in June 2020. On 13 June 2020, Destanoğlu made his Süper Lig debut at week 27 encounter of 2019–20 season, which ended 2–1 in favour of Antalyaspor.

Destanoğlu saved 6 shots on target, including one from a penalty shot from Chuba Akpom, ended 3–1 for home side PAOK at second qualifying round of 2020–21 Champions League qualifying stage, on 25 August 2020.

He was suspended following a collusion outside the box with opponent's striker Muhammet Demir, on Süper Lig encounter against Gaziantep on 6 November 2020, being the first Beşiktaş goalkeeper shown a red card since Rüştü Reçber's card given in 2007.

On 4 April 2021, Destanoğlu saved a penalty taken Swedish forward Isaac Thelin in a game against Kasımpaşa, held at Recep Tayyip Erdoğan Stadium, ended 1–0 for Kasımpaşa. Because of this, Destanoğlu became the first goalkeeper to save a penalty in a Süper Lig game since 2015–16 when Tolga Zengin saved one.

On 1 October 2022, Destanoğlu has signed a new four-year contract with Beşiktaş, keeping him at the club until 2026

== Career statistics ==
As of match played 15 May 2026

Appearances and goals by club, season and competition
Club	Season	League			Turkish Cup		Europe		Other		Total	
Club	Season	Division	Apps	Goals	Apps	Goals	Apps	Goals	Apps	Goals	Apps	Goals
Beşiktaş	2019–20	Süper Lig	8	0	0	0	0	0	—		8	0
Beşiktaş	2020–21	Süper Lig	35	0	1	0	1 (Note: Appearance(s) in UEFA Champions League)	0	—		37	0
Beşiktaş	2021–22	Süper Lig	32	0	3	0	5	0	1 (Note: Appearance in Turkish Super Cup)	0	41	0
Beşiktaş	2022–23	Süper Lig	9	0	2	0	—		—		11	0
Beşiktaş	2023–24	Süper Lig	11	0	0	0	3 (Note: Appearances in UEFA Europa Conference League)	0	—		14	0
Beşiktaş	2024–25	Süper Lig	2	0	3	0	3 (Note: Appearances in UEFA Europa League)	0	—		8	0
Beşiktaş	2025–26	Süper Lig	25	0	6	0	1 (Note: Appearances in UEFA Conference League)	0	—		32	0
Career total			122	0	15	0	13	0	1	0	151	0

== Honours ==
Beşiktaş U19

- TFF U19 League: 2017–18

Beşiktaş

- Süper Lig: 2020–21
- Turkish Cup: 2020–21, 2023–24
- Turkish Super Cup: 2021, 2024

Individual

- IFFHS World Youth (U20) Team: 2020
- Süper Lig Most clean sheets: 2020–21(shared)
