= Erdoğan Kaya =

Turkish footballer

Personal information
- Full name: Erdoğan Kaya
- Date of birth: 27 March 2001 (age 25)
- Place of birth: Altındağ, Turkey
- Height: 1.90 m (6 ft 3 in)
- Position: Centre-back

Team information
- Current team: Kırklarelispor
- Number: 30

Youth career
- 2013–2016: Laraspor
- 2016–2019: Beşiktaş

Senior career*
Years	Team	Apps	(Gls)
2019–2024	Beşiktaş	2	(0)
2021–2022	→ Turgutluspor (loan)	20	(0)
2022–2023	→ Serik Belediyespor (loan)	37	(0)
2023–2024	→ Beyoğlu Yeni Çarşı FK (loan)	28	(1)
2024–	Kırklarelispor	26	(0)

International career^{‡}
2017–2018	Turkey U17	9	(0)
2018–2019	Turkey U18	11	(1)
2018–2019	Turkey U19	9	(0)
- * Club domestic league appearances and goals as of 13 April 2025 ‡ National team caps and goals as of 14 July 2019

Erdoğan Kaya (born 27 March 2001) is a Turkish professional footballer who plays for Kırklarelispor.

== Career ==
Kaya made his professional debut with Beşiktaş in a 4-0 UEFA Europa League loss to Wolverhampton Wanderers F.C. on 12 December 2019.
