= Muhayer Oktay =

Turkish footballer

Personal information
- Full name: Muhayer Oktay
- Date of birth: 28 April 1999 (age 27)
- Place of birth: Hagen, Germany
- Height: 1.80 m (5 ft 11 in)
- Position: Midfielder

Youth career
- 2014–2017: Fortuna Düsseldorf

Senior career*
Years	Team	Apps	(Gls)
2017–2019	Fortuna Düsseldorf II	17	(0)
2019–2023	Beşiktaş	1	(0)
2020	→ Giresunspor (loan)	5	(0)

International career^{‡}
2017	Turkey U-18	4	(1)
2017–2018	Turkey U-19	14	(6)
2018–	Turkey U-21	12	(0)
- * Club domestic league appearances and goals as of 1 July 2023 ‡ National team caps and goals as of 6 August 2020

Muhayer Oktay (born 28 April 1999) is a footballer who most recently played for Beşiktaş. Born in Germany, he is a youth international for Turkey.

== Club career ==
On 17 January 2019, Oktay joined Süper Lig outfit Beşiktaş with a four-and-a-half-season-long contract from German side Fortuna Düsseldorf. On 23 August 2019, Oktay made his Süper Lig debut at 2019–20 season week 2 home-encounter against Göztepe, which ended 3–0 in favour of Beşiktaş.
