= Erdem Seçgin =

Turkish association football player

Personal information
- Date of birth: 5 January 2000 (age 26)
- Place of birth: Bağcılar, Turkey
- Height: 1.82 m (6 ft 0 in)
- Position: Midfielder

Team information
- Current team: İstanbulspor
- Number: 44

Youth career
- 2012–2013: Seyrantepe Ofspor
- 2013–2018: Beşiktaş

Senior career*
Years	Team	Apps	(Gls)
2018–2021	Beşiktaş	0	(0)
2020	→ Ümraniyespor (loan)	9	(0)
2020–2022	→ İnegölspor (loan)	28	(2)
2021–	İstanbulspor	7	(0)
2022–2023	→ Isparta 32 Spor (loan)	33	(2)
2023–2026	→ Vanspor FK (loan)	95	(6)

International career^{‡}
2017–2018	Turkey U18	4	(0)
2018–2019	Turkey U19	11	(0)
2019	Turkey U20	1	(0)
- * Club domestic league appearances and goals as of 24 October 2026 ‡ National team caps and goals as of 15 November 2019

Erdem Seçgin (born 5 January 2000) is a Turkish professional footballer who plays as a midfielder for TFF 1. Lig club İstanbulspor.

== Professional career ==
On 29 January 2018, Seçgin signed his first professional contract with Beşiktaş J.K. for 2.5 years. He made his professional debut for Beşiktaş in a 3–2 Europe League win over Sarpsborg 08 FF on 29 November 2018.
