= 2021–22 Beşiktaş J.K. season =

Beşiktaş
2021–22 season
- President: Ahmet Nur Çebi
- Head coach: Sergen Yalçın (until 9 December 2021); Önder Karaveli (from 12 December 2021 to 25 March 2022); Valérien Ismaël (from 25 March 2022)
- Stadium: Vodafone Park
- Süper Lig: 6th
- Turkish Cup: Quarter-finals
- Turkish Super Cup: Winners
- UEFA Champions League: Group stage
- Top goalscorer: League: Michy Batshuayi (14); All: Michy Batshuayi (14)
Home colours	Away colours	Third colours

The 2021–22 season was the 119th season in the existence of Beşiktaş J.K. and the club's 62nd consecutive season in the top flight of Turkish football. In addition to the domestic league, Beşiktaş participated in this season's editions of the Turkish Cup and the Turkish Super Cup.

== Season events ==
9 December, Head Coach Sergen Yalçın left his position by mutual consent.

== Squad ==
As of match played 21 May 2022

No.	Name	Nationality	Position	Date of birth (age)	Signed from	Signed In	Contract ends	Apps.	Goals
Goalkeepers
30	Ersin Destanoğlu	(Turkey)	GK	1 January 2001 (aged 21)	Academy	2018		86	0
34	Mert Günok	(Turkey)	GK	1 March 1989 (aged 33)	İstanbul Başakşehir	2021		5	0
61	Emre Bilgin	(Turkey)	GK	26 February 2004 (aged 18)	Academy	2020		3	0
74	Göktuğ Baytekin	(Turkey)	GK	20 November 2004 (aged 17)	Academy	2021		0	0
Defenders
2	Valentin Rosier	(France)	DF	19 August 1996 (aged 25)	Sporting CP	2021		76	5
3	Rıdvan Yılmaz	(Turkey)	DF	21 May 2001 (aged 21)	Academy	2019		62	4
4	Javi Montero	(Spain)	DF	14 January 1999 (aged 23)	Atlético Madrid	2021		41	2
21	Fabrice Nsakala	(Democratic Republic of the Congo)	DF	21 July 1990 (aged 31)	Alanyaspor	2020		42	1
23	Welinton	(Brazil)	DF	10 April 1989 (aged 33)	Alanyaspor	2020		71	1
24	Domagoj Vida	(Croatia)	DF	29 April 1989 (aged 33)	Dynamo Kyiv	2018		165	16
37	Kerem Kalafat	(Turkey)	DF	9 March 2001 (aged 21)	Academy	2019		5	0
46	Serdar Saatçı	(Turkey)	DF	14 February 2003 (aged 19)	Youth Team	2020		15	1
77	Umut Meraş	(Turkey)	DF	20 December 1995 (aged 26)	Le Havre	2021	2024(+1)	28	0
80	Serkan Terzi	(Turkey)	DF	5 January 2004 (aged 18)	Youth Team	2021		0	0
Midfielders
5	Josef de Souza	(Brazil)	MF	11 February 1989 (aged 33)	Al-Ahli	2020		78	8
7	Georges-Kévin Nkoudou	(France)	MF	13 February 1995 (aged 27)	Tottenham Hotspur	2019	2023	86	16
8	Salih Uçan	(Turkey)	MF	6 January 1994 (aged 28)	Alanyaspor	2021		15	0
10	Oğuzhan Özyakup	(Turkey)	MF	23 September 1992 (aged 29)	Arsenal	2012		306	35
11	Gökhan Töre	(Turkey)	MF	20 January 1992 (aged 30)	Yeni Malatyaspor	2020		158	22
12	Can Bozdoğan	(Germany)	MF	5 April 2001 (aged 21)	loan from Schalke 04	2021	2022	27	1
13	Atiba Hutchinson	(Canada)	MF	8 February 1983 (aged 39)	PSV Eindhoven	2013		326	26
14	Mehmet Topal	(Turkey)	MF	3 March 1986 (aged 36)	İstanbul Başakşehir	2021		10	0
15	Miralem Pjanić	(Bosnia and Herzegovina)	MF	2 April 1990 (aged 32)	loan from Barcelona	2021	2022	26	0
19	Ajdin Hasić	(Bosnia and Herzegovina)	MF	7 October 2001 (aged 20)	Dinamo Zagreb	2020		13	2
20	Necip Uysal	(Turkey)	MF	24 January 1991 (aged 31)	Academy	2009		393	6
22	Adem Ljajić	(Serbia)	MF	29 September 1991 (aged 30)	Torino	2019		84	18
62	Berkay Vardar	(Azerbaijan)	MF	14 January 2003 (aged 19)	Academy	2021		1	0
65	Emirhan İlkhan	(Turkey)	MF	1 June 2004 (aged 17)	Academy	2021		12	1
90	Alex Teixeira	(Brazil)	MF	6 January 1990 (aged 32)	Jiangsu Suning	2021		31	4
Strikers
9	Michy Batshuayi	(Belgium)	FW	2 October 1993 (aged 28)	loan from Chelsea	2021	2022	52	14
17	Cyle Larin	(Canada)	FW	17 April 1995 (aged 27)	Orlando City	2018		109	39
18	Rachid Ghezzal	(Algeria)	FW	9 May 1992 (aged 30)	Leicester City	2021		78	13
28	Kenan Karaman	(Turkey)	FW	5 March 1994 (aged 28)	Fortuna Düsseldorf	2021		33	2
50	Güven Yalçın	(Turkey)	FW	18 January 1999 (aged 23)	Bayer Leverkusen	2018		101	20
Unregistered
	Douglas	(Brazil)	DF	6 August 1990 (aged 31)	Barcelona	2019	2022	7	0
	Jeremain Lens	(Netherlands)	MF	24 November 1987 (aged 34)	Sunderland	2018		100	12
	Muhayer Oktay	(Turkey)	MF	28 April 1999 (aged 23)	Fortuna Düsseldorf II	2019		3	0
	Atakan Üner	(Turkey)	MF	16 June 1999 (aged 22)	Altınordu	2020		4	0
Out on loan
1	Utku Yuvakuran	(Turkey)	GK	2 November 1997 (aged 24)	Beylerbeyi	2016		20	0
11	Tyler Boyd	(United States)	MF	30 December 1994 (aged 27)	Vitória de Guimarães	2019	2023	34	4
12	Erdoğan Kaya	(Turkey)	DF	27 March 2001 (aged 21)	Youth Team	2019		5	1
	Alpay Çelebi	(Turkey)	DF	4 April 1999 (aged 23)	Academy	2017		2	0
	Ahmet Gülay	(Turkey)	DF	13 January 2003 (aged 19)	Academy	2020		0	0
	Bilal Ceylan	(Turkey)	DF	7 September 2003 (aged 18)	Eskişehirspor	2021		0	0
	Kartal Yılmaz	(Turkey)	MF	4 November 2000 (aged 21)	Academy	2019		9	0
	Oguzhan Akgün	(Turkey)	FW	13 July 2001 (aged 20)	Academy	2019		0	0
Players who left during the season

=== Out on loan ===
Note: Flags indicate national team as defined under FIFA eligibility rules; some limited exceptions apply. Players may hold more than one non-FIFA nationality.

No.	Pos.	Nation	Player
—	GK	TUR	Utku Yuvakuran (at Fatih Karagümrük until 30 June 2022)
—	DF	TUR	Ahmet Gülay (at Alanyaspor until 30 June 2022)
—	DF	TUR	Alpay Çelebi (at Kocaelispor until 30 June 2023)
—	DF	TUR	Bilal Ceylan (at Bandırmaspor until 30 June 2022)

No.	Pos.	Nation	Player
—	DF	TUR	Erdoğan Kaya (at Turgutluspor until 30 June 2022)
—	MF	TUR	Kartal Yılmaz (at Ümraniyespor until 30 June 2022)
—	FW	USA	Tyler Boyd (at Çaykur Rizespor until 30 June 2022)

== Transfers ==
=== In ===
Date	Position	Nationality	Name	From	Fee	Ref.
4 July 2021	MF	(Turkey)	Salih Uçan	Alanyaspor	Undisclosed	
12 July 2021	MF	(Turkey)	Mehmet Topal	İstanbul Başakşehir	Undisclosed	
15 July 2021	FW	(Turkey)	Kenan Karaman	Fortuna Düsseldorf	Undisclosed	
30 July 2021	DF	(France)	Valentin Rosier	Sporting CP	Undisclosed	
10 August 2021	MF	(Brazil)	Alex Teixeira	Jiangsu Suning	Undisclosed	
12 August 2021	FW	(Algeria)	Rachid Ghezzal	Leicester City	Undisclosed	
15 August 2021	GK	(Turkey)	Mert Günok	İstanbul Başakşehir	Undisclosed	
30 August 2021	DF	(Turkey)	Umut Meraş	Le Havre	€1,500,000	
1 September 2021	DF	(Spain)	Javi Montero	Atlético Madrid	Undisclosed	

=== Loans in ===
Date from	Position	Nationality	Name	From	Date to	Ref.
18 August 2021	FW	(Belgium)	Michy Batshuayi	Chelsea	End of season	
27 August 2021	MF	(Germany)	Can Bozdoğan	Schalke 04	End of season	
3 September 2021	MF	(Bosnia and Herzegovina)	Miralem Pjanić	Barcelona	End of season	

=== Out ===
Date	Position	Nationality	Name	To	Fee	Ref.
29 July 2021	MF	(Turkey)	Dorukhan Toköz	Trabzonspor	Undisclosed	
11 August 2021	FW	(Turkey)	Umut Nayir	Giresunspor	Undisclosed	

=== Loans out ===
Date from	Position	Nationality	Name	To	Date to	Ref.
28 July 2021	DF	(Turkey)	Alpay Çelebi	Kocaelispor	End of season	
30 July 2021	DF	(Turkey)	Kerem Kalafat	Uşakspor	13 January 2022	
20 August 2021	MF	(Turkey)	Kartal Yılmaz	Ümraniyespor	End of season	
20 August 2021	FW	(United States)	Tyler Boyd	Çaykur Rizespor	End of season	
24 August 2021	DF	(Turkey)	Bilal Ceylan	Bandırmaspor	End of season	
31 August 2021	GK	(Turkey)	Utku Yuvakuran	Fatih Karagümrük	End of season	

=== Released ===
Date	Position	Nationality	Name	Joined	Date	Ref
30 June 2022	DF	(Brazil)	Douglas			
30 June 2022	DF	(Democratic Republic of the Congo)	Fabrice Nsakala			
30 June 2022	MF	(Netherlands)	Jeremain Lens	Versailles	28 July 2022	
30 June 2022	MF	(Serbia)	Adem Ljajić			
30 June 2022	MF	(Turkey)	Oğuzhan Özyakup	Fortuna Sittard	1 September 2022	
30 June 2022	MF	(Turkey)	Mehmet Topal			
30 June 2022	MF	(Turkey)	Gökhan Töre	Adana Demirspor	7 September 2022	
30 June 2022	FW	(Canada)	Cyle Larin	Club Brugge	7 September 2022	
30 June 2022	FW	(Turkey)	Güven Yalçın	Genoa	21 July 2022	

== Preseason and friendlies ==
Win Draw Loss Fixtures

27 July 2021 Friendly	Beşiktaş	1–0	İstanbul Başakşehir	Istanbul, Turkey
19:00 TRT (UTC+3)	Yalçın 48'			Stadium: BJK Nevzat Demir Facilities

31 July 2021 Friendly	Beşiktaş	0–3	Kayserispor	Istanbul, Turkey
19:00 TRT (UTC+3)			Luckassen 23', 29'; Sazdağı 76'	Stadium: BJK Nevzat Demir Facilities

6 August 2021 Friendly	Adana Demirspor	1–1	Beşiktaş	Adana, Turkey
21:00 TRT (UTC+3)				Stadium: New Adana Stadium

== Competitions ==
=== Overview ===
Competition	First match	Last match	Starting round	Final position	Record							
Competition	First match	Last match	Starting round	Final position	Pld	W	D	L	GF	GA	GD	Win %
Süper Lig	13 August 2021	21 May 2022	Matchday 1	6th	38	15	14	9	56	48	+8	39.47
Turkish Cup	30 December 2021	2 March 2022	Fifth round	Quarterfinal	3	1	1	1	2	2	+0	33.33
Super Cup	5 January 2022		Final	Winners	1	0	1	0	1	1	+0	0.00
UEFA Champions League	15 September 2021	7 December 2021	Group stage	Group stage	6	0	0	6	3	19	−16	0.00
Total					48	16	16	16	62	70	−8	33.33

Last updated: 21 May 2022
Source: Soccerway

=== Süper Lig ===
==== League table ====
Pos	Team	Pld	W	D	L	GF	GA	GD	Pts	Qualification or relegation
4	Başakşehir	38	19	8	11	56	36	+20	65	Qualification for the Europa Conference League second qualifying round
5	Alanyaspor	38	19	7	12	67	58	+9	64	
6	Beşiktaş	38	15	14	9	56	48	+8	59 (Note: Beşiktaş finished ahead of Antalyaspor on head-to-head points: Antalyaspor 2–3 Beşiktaş, Beşiktaş 0–0 Antalyaspor.)	
7	Antalyaspor	38	16	11	11	54	47	+7	59	
8	Fatih Karagümrük	38	16	9	13	47	52	−5	57	

Source: Süper Lig
Rules for classification: 1) Points; 2) Head-to-head points; 3) Head-to-head goal difference; 4) Head-to-head goals scored; 5) Goal difference; 6) Goals scored; 7) Play-off.

==== Results summary ====
Overall								Home						Away					
Pld	W	D	L	GF	GA	GD	Pts	W	D	L	GF	GA	GD	W	D	L	GF	GA	GD
38	15	14	9	56	48	+8	59	10	6	3	32	23	+9	5	8	6	24	25	−1

Last updated: 21 May 2022.
Source: See Results

==== Results by round ====
Round	1	2	3	4	5	6	7	8	9	10	11	12	13	14	15	16	17	18	19	20	21	22	23	24	25	26	27	28	29	30	31	32	33	34	35	36	37	38
Ground	H	A	H	H	A	H	A	H	A	H	A	H	A	H	A	H	A	H	A	A	H	A	A	H	A	H	A	H	A	H	A	H	A	H	A	H	A	H
Result	W	D	W	W	W	D	L	W	L	W	L	L	L	L	D	W	D	W	L	D	W	W	D	D	D	W	W	D	L	D	D	W	D	L	W	D	W	D
Position	3	6	3	1	1	1	4	3	4	3	4	6	9	10	9	7	9	7	7	9	5	5	6	7	8	6	6	7	8	8	8	7	7	7	6	7	6	6

Updated to match(es) played on 21 May 2022. Source: TFF.org
A = Away; H = Home; B = Bye; W = Win; D = Draw; L = Loss

==== Matches ====
13 August 2021 1	Beşiktaş	3–0	Çaykur Rizespor	Istanbul
20:30 TRT (UTC+3)	Nkoudou 9'; Welinton (yellow card) 44'; Hutchinson 52'; Yalçın (yellow card) 84'; Larin 90+3'	Report	Sabo (yellow card) 33'	Stadium: Vodafone Park; Referee: Zorbay Kücük

21 August 2021 2	Gaziantep	0–0	Beşiktaş	Gaziantep
21:45 TRT (UTC+3)	Mendyl (yellow card) 33'; Toșca (yellow card) 45+3'	Report	Nsakala (yellow card) 12'; Vida (yellow card) 45+3'	Stadium: New Gaziantep Stadium; Referee: Ümit Öztürk

28 August 2021 3	Beşiktaş	1–0	Fatih Karagümrük	Istanbul
21:45 TRT (UTC+3)	Alex Teixeira 30'; Uçan (yellow card) 36' (yellow-red card) 48'; Destanoğlu (yellow card) 90+4'	Report	Oztumer (yellow card) 14'; Durmaz (yellow card) 16'; Zukanović (yellow card) 42'; Tatlı (yellow card) 61'	Stadium: Vodafone Park; Referee: Cüneyt Çakır

11 September 2021 4	Beşiktaş	3–0	Yeni Malatyaspor	Istanbul
20:00 TRT (UTC+3)	Batshuayi 7', 52'; Nkoudou 10'; Pjanić (yellow card) 15'	Report		Stadium: Vodafone Park; Referee: Arda Kardeşler

18 September 2021 5	Antalyaspor	2–3	Beşiktaş	Antalya
19:00 TRT (UTC+3)	Wright 42'; Sarı 45+1'	Report	Topal (yellow card) 18'; Yılmaz 49' (yellow card) 66'; Batshuayi 65'; Ghezzal 76'	Stadium: Antalya Stadium; Referee: Ali Sansalan

21 September 2021 6	Beşiktaş	3–3	Adana Demirspor	Istanbul
20:00 TRT (UTC+3)	Montero 20' (yellow card) 28'; Souza 43'; Yılmaz 52'; Welinton (yellow card) 59'; Rosier (yellow card) 60' (yellow-red card) 90+8'	Report	Deli (yellow card) 6'; Vargas 60'; Balotelli 79' (yellow card) 79'; Assombalonga 90+7'	Stadium: Vodafone Park; Referee: Ali Palabıyık

24 September 2021 7	Altay	2–1	Beşiktaş	İzmir
20:00 TRT (UTC+3)	Kappel 57'; Bamba 88'	Report	Yalçın 47'	Stadium: Bornova Aziz Kocaoğlu Stadium; Referee: Fırat Aydınus

2 October 2021 8	Beşiktaş	2–1	Sivasspor	Istanbul
19:00 TRT (UTC+3)	Yalçın 32', 69'; Souza (yellow card) 64'; Meraş (yellow card) 90'	Report	Yılmaz 54' (o.g.); Yatabaré (yellow card) 72'	Stadium: Vodafone Park; Referee: Yaşar Kemal Uğurlu

15 October 2021 9	İstanbul Başakşehir	3–2	Beşiktaş	Istanbul
20:00 TRT (UTC+3)	Okaka 40', 83'; Tekdemir (yellow card) 55'; Babacan (yellow card) 76'; Gulbrandsen 85'	Report	Rosier (yellow card) 45+1'; Teixeira 59'; Uysal (yellow card) 70'; Batshuayi 90+1' (pen.)	Stadium: Başakşehir Fatih Terim Stadium; Referee: Atilla Karaoğlan

25 October 2021 10	Beşiktaş	2–1	Galatasaray	Istanbul
20:00 TRT (UTC+3)	Larin 39', 64'; Ghezzal (yellow card) 41'; Teixeira (yellow card) 75'; Destanoğlu (yellow card) 90+4'	Report	Cicâldău 35'; Antalyalı (yellow card) 48'; Marcão (yellow card) 70'; Mohamed (penalty missed) 81'	Stadium: Vodafone Park; Attendance: 21,058; Referee: Fırat Aydınus

30 October 2021 11	Hatayspor	1–0	Beşiktaş	Antakya
16:00 TRT (UTC+3)	Lobzhanidze 6'; Boudjemaa (yellow card) 80'; Traoré (yellow card) 88'; Kamara (yellow card) 90+8'	Report	Alex Teixeira (yellow card) 45'	Stadium: Hatay New Stadium; Referee: Cüneyt Çakir

6 November 2021 12	Beşiktaş	1–2	Trabzonspor	Istanbul
19:00 TRT (UTC+3)	Larin (yellow card) 48' (goal) 62'; Vida (yellow card) 81'; Uçan (yellow card) 90+7'; Welinton (yellow card) 90+11'; Souza (yellow card) 90+11'	Report	Toköz (yellow card) 39'; Siopis (yellow card) 41'; Ömür 45+4'; Cornelius 90+6'; Çakır (yellow card) 90+11' (yellow-red card) 90+12'	Stadium: Vodafone Park; Referee: Erkan Özdamar

20 November 2021 13	Alanyaspor	2–0	Beşiktaş	Antalya
19:00 TRT (UTC+3)	Babacar 14'; Karaca (yellow card) 23'; Juanfran (yellow card) 49'; Diédhiou 90+4'	Report	Ghezzal (yellow card) 38'	Stadium: Bahçeşehir Okulları Stadium; Referee: Alper Ulusoy

26 November 2021 14	Beşiktaş	0–4	Giresunspor	Istanbul
19:00 TRT (UTC+3)	Uysal (yellow card) 39' (yellow-red card); Souza (yellow card) 62'	Report	Diabaté 22' (pen.); Baldé 55'; Serginho 64'; Champness 90'	Stadium: Vodafone Park; Referee: Hüseyīn Göçek

3 December 2021 15	Kasımpaşa	1–1	Beşiktaş	Istanbul
20:00 TRT (UTC+3)	Erdoğan (yellow card) 59'; Bozok 82'; Serbest (yellow card) 89'; Trávník (yellow card) 90+3'	Report	Bozdoğan 12'; Souza (yellow card) 43'; Larin (yellow card) 66'; Welinton (yellow card) 89'	Stadium: Recep Tayyip Erdoğan Stadium; Referee: Mete Kalkavan

12 December 2021 16	Beşiktaş	4–2	Kayserispor	Istanbul
19:00 TRT (UTC+3)	Saatçı (yellow card) 35'; Larin 45' (yellow card) 64'; Özyakup (yellow card) 76'; Batshuayi 84', 89'; Yalçın 90+6'	Report	Bulut (yellow card) 23'; Thiam 38', 71'; Akdağ (yellow card) 46'; Carole (yellow card) 85'	Stadium: Vodafone Park; Referee: Alī Şansalan

19 December 2021 17	Fenerbahçe	2–2	Beşiktaş	Istanbul
20:00 TRT (UTC+3)	Özil 14' (pen.); Berisha 30'; Szalai (yellow card) 74'; Aziz (yellow card) 78'	Report	Souza 25', 59'; Bozdoğan (yellow card) 43'; Yılmaz (yellow card) 69'; Batshuayi (yellow card) 78'; Özyakup (yellow card) 88'; Ghezzal (yellow card) 90+1'	Stadium: Şükrü Saracoğlu Stadium; Referee: Firat Aydinus

23 December 2021 18	Beşiktaş	2–1	Göztepe	Istanbul
20:00 TRT (UTC+3)	Larin 31'; Rosier (yellow card) 43' (yellow-red card) 81'; Ghezzal 60'; Pjanić (yellow card) 71'	Report	Ndiaye 3' (yellow card) 29'; Aydoğdu (penalty missed) 41'; Emir (yellow card) 43'; Akbunar (yellow card) 44'; Çankaya (yellow card) 75'	Stadium: Vodafone Park; Referee: Ümīt Öztürk

27 December 2021 19	Konyaspor	1–0	Beşiktaş	Konya
20:00 TRT (UTC+3)	M'Poku (yellow card) 45+2'; Kouka 90' (yellow card) 90+1'; Rahmanović (yellow card) 90+7'	Report	Vida (yellow card) 42'; Özyakup (yellow card) 56'; Batshuayi (yellow card) 90+3'; Ghezzal (yellow card) 90+7'	Stadium: Konya Metropolitan Municipality Stadium; Referee: Mete Kalkavan

9 January 2022 20	Çaykur Rizespor	2–2	Beşiktaş	Rize
19:00 TRT (UTC+3)	Gönül (yellow card) 17' (yellow-red card) 85'; Pohjanpalo 56', 68'; Baiano (yellow card) 79'; Umar (yellow card) 87'; Boldrin (yellow card) 89'	Report	Batshuayi 25' (pen.); Vida (yellow card) 55'; İlkhan 60'; Montero (yellow card) 78' (yellow-red card) 86'	Stadium: Yeni Rize Şehir Stadium; Referee: Alper Ulusoy

14 January 2022 21	Beşiktaş	1–0	Gaziantep	Istanbul
20:00 TRT (UTC+3)	Batshuayi 67'; Souza (yellow card) 90+3'	Report	Sagal (yellow card) 50'; Türk (yellow card) 72'; Erdoğan (yellow card) 83'	Stadium: Vodafone Park; Referee: Arda Kardesler

18 January 2022 22	Fatih Karagümrük	0–1	Beşiktaş	Istanbul
20:00 TRT (UTC+3)	Dursun (yellow card) 77'	Report	Batshuayi 38' (pen.), (yellow card) 73'	Stadium: Atatürk Olympic Stadium; Referee: Halil Umut Meler

21 January 2022 23	Yeni Malatyaspor	1–1	Beşiktaş	Malatya
13:30 TRT (UTC+3)	Büyük (yellow card) 80' (goal) 84'; Hafez (yellow card) 82'	Report	Teixeira (yellow card) 56' (goal) 62'; Yılmaz (yellow card) 69'	Stadium: New Malatya Stadium; Referee: Zorbay Küçük

6 February 2022 24	Beşiktaş	0–0	Antalyaspor	Istanbul
19:00 TRT (UTC+3)	Ghezzal (yellow card) 63'; Souza (yellow card) 78'; Rosier (yellow card) 80'; Yalçın (yellow card) 90+1'; Pjanić (yellow card) 90+6' (yellow-red card) 90+7'	Report	Naldo (yellow card) 34'; Luiz Adriano (yellow card) 49'; Sarı (yellow card) 89'; Vural (yellow card) 90+1'; Boffin (yellow card) 90+2'	Stadium: Vodafone Park; Referee: Abdulkadir Bitigen

14 February 2022 25	Adana Demirspor	1–1	Beşiktaş	Adana
20:00 TRT (UTC+3)	Vargas (yellow card) 44'; Belhanda (yellow card) 44'; Balotelli (yellow card) 45+1'; Akaydın 90+2' (yellow card) 90+7'	Report	Teixeira 31'; Welinton (yellow card) 41'; Batshuayi (yellow card) 44'	Stadium: New Adana Stadium; Referee: Ali Şansalan

19 February 2022 26	Beşiktaş	1–0	Altay	Istanbul
19:00 TRT (UTC+3)	Meraş (yellow card) 59'; Vida (yellow card) 64' (goal) 65'; Welinton (yellow card) 86'	Report	Pinares (yellow card) 64'	Stadium: Vodafone Park; Referee: Volkan Bayarslan

26 February 2022 27	Sivasspor	2–3	Beşiktaş	Sivas
19:00 TRT (UTC+3)	Yatabaré 26'; Fajr 85' (pen.)	Report	Welinton (yellow card) 3'; Batshuayi 12', 73' (pen.); Ghezzal 43'; Hutchinson (yellow card) 50'; Destanoğlu (yellow card) 90+8'	Stadium: New Sivas 4 Eylül Stadium; Referee: Sarper Baris Saka

7 March 2022 28	Beşiktaş	2–2	İstanbul Başakşehir	Istanbul
20:00 TRT (UTC+3)	Yalçın 41' (yellow card) 70'; Karaman 54'; Saatçı (yellow card) 79'; Rosier (yellow card) 82'	Report	Trézéguet 35' (yellow card) 79'; Okaka 45+4'; Gürler (yellow card) 51'; Júnior Caiçara (yellow card) 63'	Stadium: Vodafone Park; Referee: Erkan Özdamar

14 March 2022 29	Galatasaray	2–1	Beşiktaş	Istanbul
20:00 TRT (UTC+3)	Aktürkoğlu 22', 32'; Cicâldău (yellow card) 48'; Mohamed (yellow card) 68'; Bayram (yellow card) 86' van Aanholt (yellow card) 90+5'	Report	Hutchinson (yellow card) 31'; Ghezzal (yellow card) 33'; Destanoğlu (yellow card) 33'; Souza (yellow card) 64'; Yılmaz (yellow card) 85'	Stadium: Türk Telekom Stadium; Referee: Atilla Karaoğlan

19 March 2022 30	Beşiktaş	1–1	Hatayspor	Istanbul
19:00 TRT (UTC+3)	Batshuayi 16'; Bozdoğan (yellow card) 60'	Report	Lobzhanidze 41'; El Kaabi (yellow card) 45'; Ergün (yellow card) 62'; Adekugbe (yellow card) 90+1'; Ribeiro (yellow card) 90+7'	Stadium: Vodafone Park; Referee: Yasin Kol

3 April 2022 31	Trabzonspor	1–1	Beşiktaş	Trabzon
20:30 TRT (UTC+3)	Cornelius 56'; Djaniny (yellow card) 78'; Bakasetas (yellow card) 82'; Siopis (yellow card) 82'	Report	Bozdoğan (yellow card) 36'; Montero (yellow card) 53'; Batshuayi (penalty missed) 69'; Rosier 71'; Karaman (yellow card) 75'; Larin (red card) 80'; Hutchinson (yellow card) 90+1'	Stadium: Şenol Güneş Stadium; Referee: Zorbay Küçük

9 April 2022 32	Beşiktaş	4–1	Alanyaspor	Istanbul
20:30 TRT (UTC+3)	Batshuayi 2', 43' (yellow card) 60'; Souza 25'; Welinton (yellow card) 46'; Yalçın 78'	Report	Karaca 23'	Stadium: Vodafone Park; Referee: Volkan Bayarslan

17 April 2022 33	Giresunspor	0–0	Beşiktaş	Giresun
20:30 TRT (UTC+3)	Piçinciol (yellow card) 17'	Report	Uysal (yellow card) 9'	Stadium: Çotanak Stadyumu; Referee: Arda Kardeşler

25 April 2022 34	Beşiktaş	0–3	Kasımpaşa	Istanbul
20:30 TRT (UTC+3)	Souza (yellow card) 22'; Pjanić (yellow card) 35'; Destanoğlu (yellow card) 36'; Vida (yellow card) 61'; Montero (yellow card) 68'	Report	Muleka 28', 82' (yellow card) 36'; Ben Ouanes 45+1' (yellow card) 45+2'; Spajić (yellow card) 56'; Donk (yellow card) 78'	Stadium: Vodafone Park; Referee: Yasin Kol

1 May 2022 35	Kayserispor	2–3	Beşiktaş	Kayseri
16:00 TRT (UTC+3)	Thiam 23' (pen.); Cardoso 90+6'	Report	Welinton (yellow card) 26'; Saatçı 50'; Montero (yellow card) 60' (yellow-red card) 82'; Nkoudou 75', 78' (pen.); Rosier (yellow card) 76'	Stadium: Kadir Has Stadium; Referee: Erkan Özdamar

8 May 2022 36	Beşiktaş	1–1	Fenerbahçe	Istanbul
19:00 TRT (UTC+3)	Batshuayi (penalty missed) 9'; Souza (yellow card) 29'; Ghezzal 31' (pen.) (yellow card) 45+2'; Welinton (yellow card) 36'; Destanoğlu (yellow card) 45+4'; Nkoudou (yellow card) 89'; Yılmaz (yellow card) 90+3'	Report	Novák 6'; Kahveci (yellow card) 29'; Yandaş (yellow card) 45+4'; Kadıoğlu (yellow card) 90+2'	Stadium: Vodafone Park; Referee: Arda Kardeşler

15 May 2022 37	Göztepe	0–2	Beşiktaş	İzmir
16:00 TRT (UTC+3)	Paluli (yellow card) 25'; Çankaya (yellow card) 31'; Di Santo (yellow card) 55'; Kayan (yellow card) 60'; Jahović (red card) 75'; Özkayımoğlu (yellow card) 83'; Alıcı (yellow card) 86'	Report	Rosier (yellow card) 9' (yellow-red card) 19'; Larin 27'; Souza 32' (red card) 37'; Bilgin (yellow card) 45'; Batshuayi (yellow card) 87'	Stadium: Gürsel Aksel Stadium; Referee: Umit Öztürk

21 May 2022 38	Beşiktaş	1–1	Konyaspor	Istanbul
19 TRT (UTC+3)	Saatçı (yellow card) 15'; Ghezzal (yellow card) 79'; Montero (yellow card) 80'; Karaman 90+1'	Report	Cikalleshi (yellow card) 18'; Rahmanović 42'; Šehić (yellow card) 45'; Hassan (yellow card) 85'	Stadium: Vodafone Park; Referee: Sarper Baris Saka

=== Turkish Cup ===
30 December 2021 Fifth round	Beşiktaş	1–0	Altay	Istanbul
21:00 TRT (UTC+3)	Meraş (yellow card) 35'; Hutchinson (yellow card) 55' (goal) 61'; Montero (yellow card) 77'	Report	Gülselam (yellow card) 30'; Thaciano (yellow card) 60'; Naderi (yellow card) 80'	Stadium: Vodafone Park; Referee: Ali Şansalan

10 February 2022 Round of 16	Beşiktaş	0–0 (3–1 p)	Göztepe	Istanbul
20:30 TRT (UTC+3)	Montero (yellow card) 44'; Özyakup (yellow card) 54'; Pjanić (yellow card) 90+1'; Yalçın (yellow card) 90+5'	Report	Akbunar (yellow card) 45+6'; Arslanagić (yellow card) 74'	Stadium: Vodafone Park; Referee: Yasin Kol
	Penalties
	Pjanić (penalty missed); Batshuayi (penalty scored); Hutchinson (penalty scored); Vida (penalty scored)		(penalty missed) Di Santo; (penalty missed) Emir; (penalty scored) Ángel; (penalty missed) Lourency

2 March 2022 Quarterfinal	Beşiktaş	1–2	Kayserispor	Istanbul
20:30 TRT (UTC+3)	Rosier 43' (yellow card) 62' (yellow-red card) 90+3'; Uysal (yellow card) 55'	Report	Gavranovic 6'; Cardoso (yellow card) 45+3' (goal) 65'; Akdağ (yellow card) 57'; Bertolacci (yellow card) 62'	Stadium: Vodafone Park; Referee: Halil Meler

=== Turkish Super Cup ===
5 January 2022 Final	Beşiktaş	1–1 (a.e.t.) (4–2 p)	Antalyaspor	Doha, Qatar
20:45 TRT (UTC+3)	Hutchinson 33'; Pjanić (yellow card) 55'; Welinton (yellow card) 113'	Report	Sarı (yellow card) 4'; Boffin (yellow card) 60'; Hutchinson 74' (o.g.)	Stadium: Ahmed bin Ali Stadium; Referee: Halil Umut Meler
	Penalties
	Teixeira (penalty scored); Batshuayi (penalty scored); Hutchinson (penalty scored); Vida (penalty scored)		(penalty scored) Vural; (penalty missed) Erdilman; (penalty scored) Özmert; (penalty missed) Floranus

=== UEFA Champions League ===
==== Group stage ====
The draw for the group stage was held on 26 August 2021.

Pos	Team	Pld	W	D	L	GF	GA	GD	Pts	Qualification
1	(Netherlands) Ajax	6	6	0	0	20	5	+15	18	Advance to knockout phase
2	(Portugal) Sporting CP	6	3	0	3	14	12	+2	9 (Note: Tied on head-to-head points. Head-to-head goal difference: Sporting CP +1, Borussia Dortmund −1.)	Advance to knockout phase
3	(Germany) Borussia Dortmund	6	3	0	3	10	11	−1	9	Transfer to Europa League
4	(Turkey) Beşiktaş	6	0	0	6	3	19	−16	0	

Source: UEFA
Rules for classification: Group stage tiebreakers
Notes:

15 September 2021 1	Beşiktaş (Turkey)	1–2	(Germany) Borussia Dortmund	Istanbul, Turkey
19:45 TRT (UTC+3)	Welinton (yellow card) 43'; Montero (yellow card) 45', (goal) 90+3'; Hutchinson (yellow card) 76'	Report	Bellingham 20'; Haaland 45+3'; Meunier (yellow card) 55'; Moukoko (yellow card) 79'	Stadium: Vodafone Park; Attendance: 22,445; Referee: Antonio Mateu Lahoz (Spain)

28 September 2021 2	Ajax (Netherlands)	2–0	(Turkey) Beşiktaş	Amsterdam, Netherlands
18:45 CEST (UTC+2)	Berghuis 17'; Haller 43'	Report	Bozdoğan (yellow card) 75'; Batshuayi (yellow card) 90+3'	Stadium: Johan Cruyff Arena; Attendance: 52,628; Referee: Benoît Bastien (France)

19 October 2021 3	Beşiktaş (Turkey)	1–4	(Portugal) Sporting CP	Istanbul, Turkey
19:45 TRT (UTC+3)	Larin 24'; Vida (yellow card) 43'; Teixeira (yellow card) 47'; Ghezzal (yellow card) 58'; Pjanić (yellow card) 90+3'	Report	Coates 15', 27'; Porro (yellow card) 25'; Sarabia 44' (pen.); Inácio (yellow card) 72'; Feddal (yellow card) 76'	Stadium: Vodafone Park; Attendance: 22,936; Referee: Slavko Vinčić (Slovenia)

3 November 2021 4	Sporting CP (Portugal)	4–0	(Turkey) Beşiktaş	Lisbon, Portugal
20:00 WET (UTC±0)	Gonçalves 31' (pen.), 38'; Paulinho 41'; Sarabia 56'	Report		Stadium: Estádio José Alvalade; Attendance: 40,835; Referee: Sergei Karasev (Russia)

24 November 2021 5	Beşiktaş (Turkey)	1–2	(Netherlands) Ajax	Istanbul, Turkey
20:45 TRT (UTC+3)	Ghezzal 22' (pen.); Larin (yellow card) 88'	Report	Haller 54', 69', (yellow card) 85'	Stadium: Vodafone Park; Attendance: 11,712; Referee: Irfan Peljto (Bosnia and Herzegovina)

7 December 2021 6	Borussia Dortmund (Germany)	5–0	(Turkey) Beşiktaş	Dortmund, Germany
21:00 CET (UTC+1)	Malen 29'; Reus 45+2' (pen.), 53'; Haaland 68', 81'	Report	Montero (yellow card) 31'; Larin (yellow card) 39'; Welinton (red card) 43'; Souza (yellow card) 44'	Stadium: Westfalenstadion; Attendance: 15,000; Referee: François Letexier (France)

== Squad statistics ==
As of match played 21 May 2022

=== Appearances and goals ===
No.	Pos	Nat	Player	Total		Süper Lig		Turkish Cup		Super Cup		Champions League	
No.	Pos	Nat	Player	Apps	Goals	Apps	Goals	Apps	Goals	Apps	Goals	Apps	Goals
2	DF	(France) FRA	Valentin Rosier	39	2	31	1	2	1	1	0	4+1	0
3	DF	(Turkey) TUR	Rıdvan Yılmaz	33	3	23+4	3	1+2	0	1	0	2	0
4	DF	(Spain) ESP	Javi Montero	25	2	15+2	1	3	0	1	0	4	1
5	MF	(Brazil) BRA	Souza	40	5	29+3	5	2	0	1	0	5	0
7	MF	(France) FRA	Georges-Kévin Nkoudou	17	4	6+10	4	0	0	0	0	1	0
8	MF	(Turkey) TUR	Salih Uçan	15	0	5+5	0	0	0	0	0	1+4	0
9	FW	(Belgium) BEL	Michy Batshuayi	42	14	28+5	14	2+1	0	1	0	4+1	0
10	MF	(Turkey) TUR	Oğuzhan Özyakup	17	0	7+6	0	2	0	0	0	0+2	0
11	MF	(Turkey) TUR	Gökhan Töre	16	0	2+10	0	0	0	0	0	0+4	0
12	MF	(Germany) GER	Can Bozdoğan	27	1	12+11	1	0	0	0	0	2+2	0
13	MF	(Canada) CAN	Atiba Hutchinson	33	3	14+11	1	2+1	1	1	1	2+2	0
14	MF	(Turkey) TUR	Mehmet Topal	10	0	1+6	0	0	0	0	0	3	0
15	MF	(Bosnia and Herzegovina) BIH	Miralem Pjanić	26	0	16+4	0	1+1	0	1	0	3	0
17	FW	(Canada) CAN	Cyle Larin	38	8	19+10	7	1+2	0	1	0	5	1
18	FW	(Algeria) ALG	Rachid Ghezzal	43	5	33+2	4	3	0	0	0	4+1	1
20	MF	(Turkey) TUR	Necip Uysal	31	0	18+9	0	1	0	0	0	2+1	0
21	DF	(Democratic Republic of the Congo) COD	Fabrice Nsakala	7	0	4	0	0	0	0	0	3	0
23	DF	(Brazil) BRA	Welinton	30	0	20+3	0	1+1	0	0+1	0	4	0
24	DF	(Croatia) CRO	Domagoj Vida	32	1	28	1	1	0	1	0	2	0
28	FW	(Turkey) TUR	Kenan Karaman	33	2	13+12	2	1+1	0	1	0	3+2	0
30	GK	(Turkey) TUR	Ersin Destanoğlu	41	0	31+1	0	3	0	1	0	5	0
34	GK	(Turkey) TUR	Mert Günok	5	0	4	0	0	0	0	0	1	0
37	DF	(Turkey) TUR	Kerem Kalafat	3	0	2	0	1	0	0	0	0	0
46	DF	(Turkey) TUR	Serdar Saatçı	14	1	8+3	1	1+1	0	0	0	1	0
50	FW	(Turkey) TUR	Güven Yalçın	33	6	10+20	6	1+2	0	0	0	0	0
61	GK	(Turkey) TUR	Emre Bilgin	3	0	3	0	0	0	0	0	0	0
62	MF	(Azerbaijan) AZE	Berkay Vardar	1	0	0	0	0	0	0	0	0+1	0
65	MF	(Turkey) TUR	Emirhan Ilkhan	10	1	5+4	1	0	0	0+1	0	0	0
77	DF	(Turkey) TUR	Umut Meraş	28	0	14+8	0	2	0	0+1	0	3	0
90	MF	(Brazil) BRA	Alex Teixeira	31	4	15+9	4	2+1	0	0+1	0	2+1	0
Players out on loan:
Players who left Beşiktaş during the season:

=== Goal scorers ===
Place	Position	Nation	Number	Name	Süper Lig	Turkish Cup	Super Cup	Champions League	Total
1	FW	(Belgium)	9	Michy Batshuayi	14	0	0	0	14
2	FW	(Canada)	17	Cyle Larin	7	0	0	1	8
3	FW	(Turkey)	50	Güven Yalçın	6	0	0	0	6
4	MF	(Brazil)	5	Souza	5	0	0	0	5
4	FW	(Algeria)	18	Rachid Ghezzal	4	0	0	1	5
6	MF	(Brazil)	90	Alex Teixeira	4	0	0	0	4
6	MF	(France)	7	Georges-Kévin Nkoudou	4	0	0	0	4
8	DF	(Turkey)	3	Rıdvan Yılmaz	3	0	0	0	3
8	MF	(Canada)	13	Atiba Hutchinson	1	1	1	0	3
10	FW	(Turkey)	28	Kenan Karaman	2	0	0	0	2
10	DF	(France)	2	Valentin Rosier	1	1	0	0	2
10	DF	(Spain)	4	Javi Montero	1	0	0	1	2
13	MF	(Germany)	12	Can Bozdoğan	1	0	0	0	1
13	MF	(Turkey)	65	Emirhan Ilkhan	1	0	0	0	1
13	DF	(Croatia)	24	Domagoj Vida	1	0	0	0	1
13	DF	(Turkey)	46	Serdar Saatçı	1	0	0	0	1
				TOTALS	56	2	1	3	62

=== Clean sheets ===
Place	Position	Nation	Number	Name	Süper Lig	Turkish Cup	Super Cup	Champions League	Total
1	GK	(Turkey)	30	Ersin Destanoğlu	9	2	0	0	11
2	GK	(Turkey)	61	Emre Bilgin	1	0	0	0	1
				TOTALS	10	2	0	0	12

=== Disciplinary record ===
Number	Nation	Position	Name	Süper Lig		Turkish Cup		Super Cup		Champions League		Total	
Number	Nation	Position	Name	Yellow card	Red card	Yellow card	Red card	Yellow card	Red card	Yellow card	Red card	Yellow card	Red card
2	(France)	DF	Valentin Rosier	10	3	2	1	0	0	0	0	12	4
3	(Turkey)	DF	Rıdvan Yılmaz	4	0	0	0	0	0	0	0	4	0
4	(Spain)	DF	Javi Montero	8	2	2	0	0	0	0	0	10	2
5	(Brazil)	MF	Souza	9	1	0	0	0	0	3	1	12	2
7	(France)	MF	Georges-Kévin Nkoudou	1	0	0	0	0	0	0	0	1	0
8	(Turkey)	MF	Salih Uçan	3	1	0	0	0	0	0	0	3	1
9	(Belgium)	FW	Michy Batshuayi	6	0	0	0	0	0	1	0	7	0
10	(Turkey)	MF	Oğuzhan Özyakup	3	0	1	0	0	0	0	0	4	0
12	(Germany)	MF	Can Bozdoğan	3	0	0	0	0	0	1	0	3	0
13	(Canada)	MF	Atiba Hutchinson	3	0	1	0	0	0	1	0	5	0
14	(Turkey)	MF	Mehmet Topal	1	0	0	0	0	0	0	0	1	0
15	(Bosnia and Herzegovina)	MF	Miralem Pjanić	5	1	1	0	1	0	1	0	8	1
17	(Canada)	FW	Cyle Larin	3	1	0	0	0	0	3	0	6	1
18	(Algeria)	FW	Rachid Ghezzal	8	0	0	0	0	0	0	0	8	0
20	(Turkey)	MF	Necip Uysal	2	1	1	0	0	0	0	0	3	1
21	(Democratic Republic of the Congo)	DF	Fabrice Nsakala	1	0	0	0	0	0	0	0	1	0
23	(Brazil)	DF	Welinton	10	0	0	0	1	0	1	1	12	1
24	(Croatia)	DF	Domagoj Vida	6	0	0	0	0	0	1	0	7	0
28	(Turkey)	FW	Kenan Karaman	1	0	0	0	0	0	0	0	1	0
30	(Turkey)	GK	Ersin Destanoğlu	6	0	0	0	0	0	0	0	6	0
46	(Turkey)	DF	Serdar Saatçı	3	0	0	0	0	0	0	0	3	0
50	(Turkey)	FW	Güven Yalçın	3	0	1	0	0	0	0	0	4	0
61	(Turkey)	GK	Emre Bilgin	1	0	0	0	0	0	0	0	1	0
77	(Turkey)	DF	Umut Meraş	2	0	1	0	0	0	0	0	3	0
90	(Brazil)	MF	Alex Teixeira	3	0	0	0	0	0	1	0	4	0
Players away on loan:
Players who left Beşiktaş during the season:
			TOTALS	105	10	10	1	2	0	12	2	129	13
