= 2023–24 Fatih Karagümrük S.K. season =

Fatih Karagümrük S.K.
2023–24 season
- Owner: Süleyman Hurma
- President: Süleyman Hurma
- Manager: Alparslan Erdem
- Stadium: Atatürk Olympic Stadium
- Süper Lig: 18th (relegated)
- Turkish Cup: Semi-finals
- Top goalscorer: League: Güven Yalçın (9); All: Güven Yalçın ()

The 2023–24 season was Fatih Karagümrük S.K.'s 98th season in existence and fourth consecutive in the Süper Lig, the top division of association football in Turkey. They also competed in the Turkish Cup.

== Players ==
=== First-team squad ===
As of 9 February 2024

No.	Pos.	Nation	Player
3	DF	ALB	Frédéric Veseli
4	DF	ITA	Davide Biraschi
6	MF	SWE	Marcus Rohdén
7	FW	AUT	Can Keles (on loan from Austria Wien)
8	MF	ALG	Sofiane Feghouli
9	MF	FRA	Valentin Eysseric
10	FW	TUR	Güven Yalçın (on loan from Genoa)
11	FW	TUR	Emre Mor (on loan from Fenerbahçe)
13	GK	TUR	Furkan Bekleviç
15	FW	ITA	Kevin Lasagna (on loan from Verona)
18	MF	GER	Levent Mercan
20	FW	CPV	Ryan Mendes
21	MF	GRE	Dimitrios Kourbelis (on loan from Trabzonspor)
22	DF	TUR	Emir Tintiş

No.	Pos.	Nation	Player
23	GK	TUR	Emre Bilgin (on loan from Beşiktaş)
25	DF	GER	Koray Günter (on loan from Hellas Verona)
26	DF	ITA	Federico Ceccherini (on loan from Verona)
30	DF	TUR	Nazım Sangaré
31	GK	ITA	Salvatore Sirigu
37	DF	TUR	Efecan Mızrakcı
54	DF	TUR	Salih Dursun
77	MF	BEL	Adnan Ugur
91	MF	ITA	Andrea Bertolacci (on loan from Cremonese)
97	MF	ITA	Flavio Paoletti
98	FW	TUR	Ahmet Tarık Tuğyan
99	FW	CRO	Tonio Teklić (on loan from Trabzonspor)
—	FW	BRA	Marcão (on loan from Al-Ahli)

=== Out on loan ===
Note: Flags indicate national team as defined under FIFA eligibility rules; some limited exceptions apply. Players may hold more than one non-FIFA nationality.

No.	Pos.	Nation	Player
—	DF	TUR	Egemen Pehlivan (at Diyarbekirspor until 30 June 2024)
—	DF	TUR	Emir Yazıcı (at Serik Belediyespor until 30 June 2024)
—	MF	TUR	Ömer Gümüş (at Karaman FK until 30 June 2024)

No.	Pos.	Nation	Player
—	MF	TUR	Efe Tatlı (at Karşıyaka until 30 June 2024)
—	FW	TUR	Berke Demircan (at Vanspor FK until 30 June 2024)
—	FW	TUR	Serdar Dursun (at Fenerbahçe until 30 June 2024)

== Transfers ==
=== In ===
Pos.	Player	Transferred from	Fee	Date	Source
DF	(Italy) Federico Ceccherini	(Italy) Hellas Verona	Loan	15 August 2023	
FW	(Italy) Kevin Lasagna	(Italy) Hellas Verona	Loan	15 August 2023	
MF	(Italy) Stefano Sturaro	(Italy) Genoa	Free	21 August 2023	
GK	(Italy) Salvatore Sirigu	(France) Nice	Free	16 January 2024	
FW	(Turkey) Serdar Dursun	(Turkey) Fenerbahçe	Undisclosed	25 August 2023	
MF	(Turkey) Kerem Atakan Kesgin	(Turkey) Beşiktaş	Loan	26 August 2023	

=== Out ===
Pos.	Player	Transferred to	Fee	Date	Source
DF	(Turkey) Rayyan Baniya	(Turkey) Trabzonspor	Undisclosed	18 August 2023	
MF	(Serbia) Adem Ljajić	(Serbia) Novi Pazar	Free	14 September 2023	

== Pre-season and friendlies ==
Win Draw Loss

== Competitions ==
=== Overall record ===
Competition	First match	Last match	Starting round	Final position	Record							
Competition	First match	Last match	Starting round	Final position	Pld	W	D	L	GF	GA	GD	Win %
Süper Lig	14 August 2023	26 May 2024	Matchday 1	18th	38	10	10	18	49	52	−3	26.32
Turkish Cup	5 December 2023	8 May 2024	Fourth round	Semi-finals	6	4	0	2	11	9	+2	66.67
Total					44	14	10	20	60	61	−1	31.82

Source: Soccerway

=== Süper Lig ===
==== League table ====
Pos	Team	Pld	W	D	L	GF	GA	GD	Pts	Qualification or relegation
16	Konyaspor	38	9	14	15	40	53	−13	41 (Note: Hatayspor are ahead of Konyaspor on overall goal difference.)	
17	Ankaragücü (R)	38	8	16	14	46	52	−6	40 (Note: Ankaragücü are ahead of Fatih Karagümrük on head-to-head points: Fatih Karagümrük 1–1 Ankaragücü, Ankaragücü 2–0 Fatih Karagümrük.)	Relegation to TFF First League
18	Fatih Karagümrük (R)	38	10	10	18	49	52	−3	40	Relegation to TFF First League
19	Pendikspor (R)	38	9	10	19	42	73	−31	37	Relegation to TFF First League
20	İstanbulspor (Note: 3 points deducted) (R)	38	4	7	27	27	80	−53	16	Relegation to TFF First League

Source: Süper Lig
Rules for classification: 1) Points; 2) Head-to-head points; 3) Head-to-head goal difference; 4) Head-to-head goals scored; 5) Goal difference; 6) Goals scored; 7) Play-off.
(R) Relegated

==== Results summary ====
Overall								Home						Away					
Pld	W	D	L	GF	GA	GD	Pts	W	D	L	GF	GA	GD	W	D	L	GF	GA	GD
30	7	9	14	34	38	−4	30	6	6	3	24	12	+12	1	3	11	10	26	−16

Last updated: 15 March 2024.
Source: Trendyol Süper Lig

==== Results by round ====
Round	1	2	3	4	5	6	7	8	9	10	11	12	13	14	15	16	17	18	19	20	21	22	23	24	25	26	27	28	29	30
Ground	H	A	H	A	H	A	H	A	H	H	A	H	A	H	A	H	A	H	A	A	H	A	H	A	H	A	H	A	A	H
Result	L	W	D	L	D	D	L	L	W	D	D	W	L	W	L	W	L	L	L	L	D	L	W	L	W	D	D	L	L	D
Position	18	9	10	13	13	14	15	16	13	13	14	12	14	11	13	10	11	14	15	17	16	18	16	17	16	16	14	16	18	18

Updated to match(es) played on 16 February 2024. Source: Trendyol Süper Lig
A = Away; H = Home; W = Win; D = Draw; L = Loss

==== Matches ====
The league fixtures were unveiled on 19 July 2023.

14 August 2023 1	Fatih Karagümrük	0–1	Beşiktaş	Istanbul
21:00 UTC+3	Mercan (yellow card) 24'; Veseli (yellow card) 54'; Drešević (yellow card) 69'; Dursun (yellow card) 90+1'	Report	Uysal (yellow card) 35'; Aboubakar (penalty missed) 48'; Fernandes 85'	Stadium: Atatürk Olympic Stadium; Attendance: 1,134; Referee: Erkan Özdamar

20 August 2023 2	İstanbul Başakşehir	0–2	Fatih Karagümrük	Istanbul
19:15 UTC+3	Kartsev (yellow card) 28'; Gürler (yellow card) 32'; Pelkas (yellow card) 85'	Report	Mendes 6', (yellow card) 38'; Şengezer 30' (o.g.); Rohdén (yellow card) 61'; Shukurov (yellow card) 90'; Dursun (yellow card) 90+4'	Stadium: Başakşehir Fatih Terim Stadium; Attendance: 2,101; Referee: Burak Şeker

27 August 2023 3	Fatih Karagümrük	1–1	Ankaragücü	Istanbul
19:15 UTC+3	Rohdén 44'; Ugur (yellow card) 80'	Report	Mujakić (yellow card) 55'; Bekiroğlu 57'	Stadium: Esenyurt Necmi Kadıoğlu Stadium; Referee: Turgut Doman

10 February 2024 25	Fatih Karagümrük	2–0	Pendikspor	Istanbul
16:00 TRT (UTC+3)	Mor 31'; Ceccherini (yellow card) 59'; Yalçın 76'			Stadium: Atatürk Olympic Stadium; Referee: Zorbay Küçük

16 February 2024 26	Kasımpaşa	1–1	Fatih Karagümrük	Istanbul
20:00 TRT (UTC+3)	Da Costa 11', (yellow card) 71'; Porozo (yellow card) 69'		Eysseric 38'; Mor (yellow card) 78'; Mendes (yellow card) 84'	Stadium: Recep Tayyip Erdoğan Stadium; Referee: Kadir Sağlam

25 February 2024 27	Fatih Karagümrük	v	Alanyaspor	Istanbul
16:00 TRT (UTC+3)				Stadium: Atatürk Olympic Stadium

=== Turkish Cup ===
5 December 2023 Fourth round	Fatih Karagümrük	3–1	Belediye Derincespor	Istanbul
13:00	Dresevic 19'; Şeker 37' (o.g.); Dursun 49'		Baydemir 63' (pen.)	Stadium: Atatürk Olympic Stadium

16 January 2024 Fifth round	Fatih Karagümrük	2–0	Kırklarelispor	Istanbul
13:00	Dursun 54', 84'			Stadium: Atatürk Olympic Stadium

6 February 2024 Round of 16	Fatih Karagümrük	2–1	Samsunspor	Istanbul
14:30	Biraschi 72'; Paoletti 89'		Mouandilmadji 68'	Stadium: Atatürk Olympic Stadium

29 February 2024 Quarter-finals	Galatasaray	0-2	Fatih Karagümrük	Istanbul
20:45	Nelsson (yellow card) 56'	Report	Marcão 6'; Veseli (yellow card) 49'; Mendes 84'	Stadium: Rams Park; Referee: Arda Kardeşler; Assistant referees: İbrahim Çağlar Uyarcan, Mehmet Emin Tuğral; Fourth official: Oğuzhan Çakır
