= Serdar Saatçı =

Turkish footballer (born 2003)

Personal information
- Full name: Serdar Saatçı
- Date of birth: 14 February 2003 (age 23)
- Place of birth: Bayrampaşa, Istanbul, Turkey
- Height: 1.90 m (6 ft 3 in)
- Position: Centre-back

Team information
- Current team: Çorum
- Number: 4

Youth career
- 2013–2014: Bayrampaşaspor
- 2014–2020: Beşiktaş

Senior career*
Years	Team	Apps	(Gls)
2020–2022	Beşiktaş	11	(1)
2022	Braga B	5	(0)
2022–2024	Braga	20	(0)
2024–2026	Trabzonspor	14	(0)
2026	→ Al-Nasr (loan)	11	(0)
2026–	Çorum	3	(0)

International career^{‡}
2017–2018	Turkey U15	7	(0)
2019	Turkey U16	1	(0)
2019–2020	Turkey U17	4	(0)
2021–2024	Turkey U21	20	(0)
- * Club domestic league appearances and goals as of 16 October 2026 ‡ National team caps and goals as of 15 October 2024

Serdar Saatçı (14 February 2003) is a Turkish professional footballer who plays as a centre-back for Süper Lig club Çorum.

== Career ==
=== Early years ===
Saatçı started his career at Istanbul-based club Bayrampaşaspor in the TFF Third League.

=== Beşiktaş ===
He joined Beşiktaş J.K. in 2014, where he played at various youth levels until 2020. He signed a professional contract with Beşiktaş on 27 February 2020. He was on the bench as an unused substitute player in 2021 Turkish Cup final, won by Beşiktaş 2–0 on 18 May 2021. Saatçı made his Süper Lig debut on week 7 of 2021–22 Süper Lig season against Altay S.K., on 24 September 2021.

On 12 July 2022, Saatçı was dropped from the senior team by the club following "behavioural issues" during a friendly game against Viktoria Plzeň as part of Beşiktaş' pre-season camp in Austria. He continued training individually in Ümraniye Nevzat Demir Facilities in Istanbul.

=== Braga ===
On 1 September 2022, Saatçı signed a five-year contract with Primeira Liga club Braga for €1.5 million.

=== Trabzonspor ===
On 13 September 2024, Saatçı signed a four-year contract with Süper Lig club Trabzonspor.

==== Al-Nasr (loan) ====
On 11 January 2026, Trabzonspor sent Saatçı on loan to UAE Pro League club Al-Nasr until the end of the season, with an optional buy-clause reported to be around €2.5 million.

== Career statistics ==
As of match played 25 July 2024

Appearances and goals by club, season and competition
Club	Season	League			National cup (Note: Includes Turkish Cup, Taça de Portugal)		League cup (Note: Includes Taça da Liga)		Europe		Total	
Club	Season	Division	Apps	Goals	Apps	Goals	Apps	Goals	Apps	Goals	Apps	Goals
Beşiktaş	2020–21	Süper Lig	0	0	1	0	—		0	0	1	0
Beşiktaş	2021–22	Süper Lig	11	1	2	0	—		1 (Note: Appearance(s) in UEFA Champions League)	0	14	1
Beşiktaş	Total		11	1	3	0	0	0	1	0	15	1
Braga B	2022–23	Liga 3	5	0	—		—		—		5	0
Braga	2022–23	Primeira Liga	3	0	1	0	1	0	1 (Note: Appearance in UEFA Europa Conference League)	0	6	0
Braga	2023–24	Primeira Liga	17	0	1	0	3	0	6 (Note: Five appearances in UEFA Champions League, one appearance in UEFA Europa League)	0	27	0
Braga	2024–25	Primeira Liga	0	0	0	0	0	0	1 (Note: Appearances in UEFA Europa League)	0	1	0
Braga	Total		20	0	2	0	4	0	8	0	34	0
Career total			36	1	5	0	4	0	9	0	53	1

== Honours ==
Beşiktaş

- Süper Lig: 2020–21
- Turkish Cup: 2020–21
- Turkish Super Cup: 2021

Braga

- Taça da Liga: 2023–24
