= Ryan Mendes =

Cape Verdean footballer (born 1990)

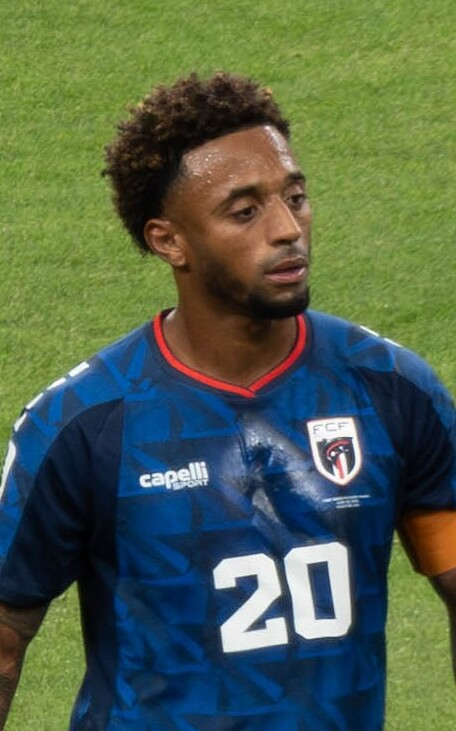
- Mendes with Cape Verde at the 2026 FIFA World Cup

Personal information
- Full name: Ryan Isaac Mendes da Graça
- Date of birth: 8 January 1990 (age 36)
- Place of birth: Mindelo, Cape Verde
- Height: 1.78 m (5 ft 10 in)
- Position: Winger

Team information
- Current team: RS Berkane
- Number: 10

Youth career
- Batuque FC

Senior career*
Years	Team	Apps	(Gls)
2008–2012	Le Havre	84	(20)
2010	Le Havre II	1	(0)
2012–2017	Lille	54	(7)
2014–2016	Lille II	2	(1)
2015–2016	→ Nottingham Forest (loan)	35	(2)
2017–2018	Kayserispor	39	(5)
2018–2020	Sharjah	44	(20)
2020–2023	Al Nasr	68	(15)
2023–2024	Fatih Karagümrük	23	(4)
2024–2025	Kocaelispor	39	(12)
2025–2026	Iğdır	29	(5)
2026–	RS Berkane	4	(0)

International career^{‡}
2006	Cape Verde U16	9	(2)
2007	Cape Verde U21	8	(1)
2010–	Cape Verde	105	(22)
Medal record
Men's football
Representing Cape Verde
FIFA Series
Winner	2024 Saudi Arabia A
- * Club domestic league appearances and goals as of 18:54, 6 November 2026 (UTC) ‡ National team caps and goals as of 23:01, 17 November 2026 (UTC)

Ryan Isaac Mendes da Graça (Portuguese: [ʀi.ˈɐ̃ i.ˈzak ˈmẽ.dɨʒ dɐ ˈɡɾa.sɐ]; born 8 January 1990) is a Cape Verdean professional footballer who plays as a winger for the Moroccan Botola Pro side RS Berkane and the Cape Verde national team.

He spent most of his club career in France with Le Havre and Lille, and in the UAE Pro League with Sharjah and Al-Nasr. He also had brief spells in England's Championship with Nottingham Forest, and the Turkish Süper Lig with Kayserispor, Fatih Karagümrük, Kocaelispor and Iğdır.

Mendes made his senior international debut for Cape Verde in 2010. He has since earned 100 caps, and is currently both the team's record appearance holder and all-time top goalscorer. He represented the nation at the Africa Cup of Nations in 2013, 2015, 2021 and 2023, and at their debut FIFA World Cup in 2026.

== Club career ==
=== Le Havre ===
Born in Mindelo, São Vicente, Mendes began his career with hometown club Batuque FC. In 2008 he was sold to Le Havre AC, with whom he played his first game in Ligue 1 on 13 May 2009 against AS Saint-Étienne, as a late substitute for Maxime Baca in a 4–2 home loss. He was monitored by Leicester City scout Steve Walsh, who instead signed teammate Riyad Mahrez to the club.

In the 2011–12 Ligue 2, Mendes was joint third top scorer with 13 goals.

=== Lille ===
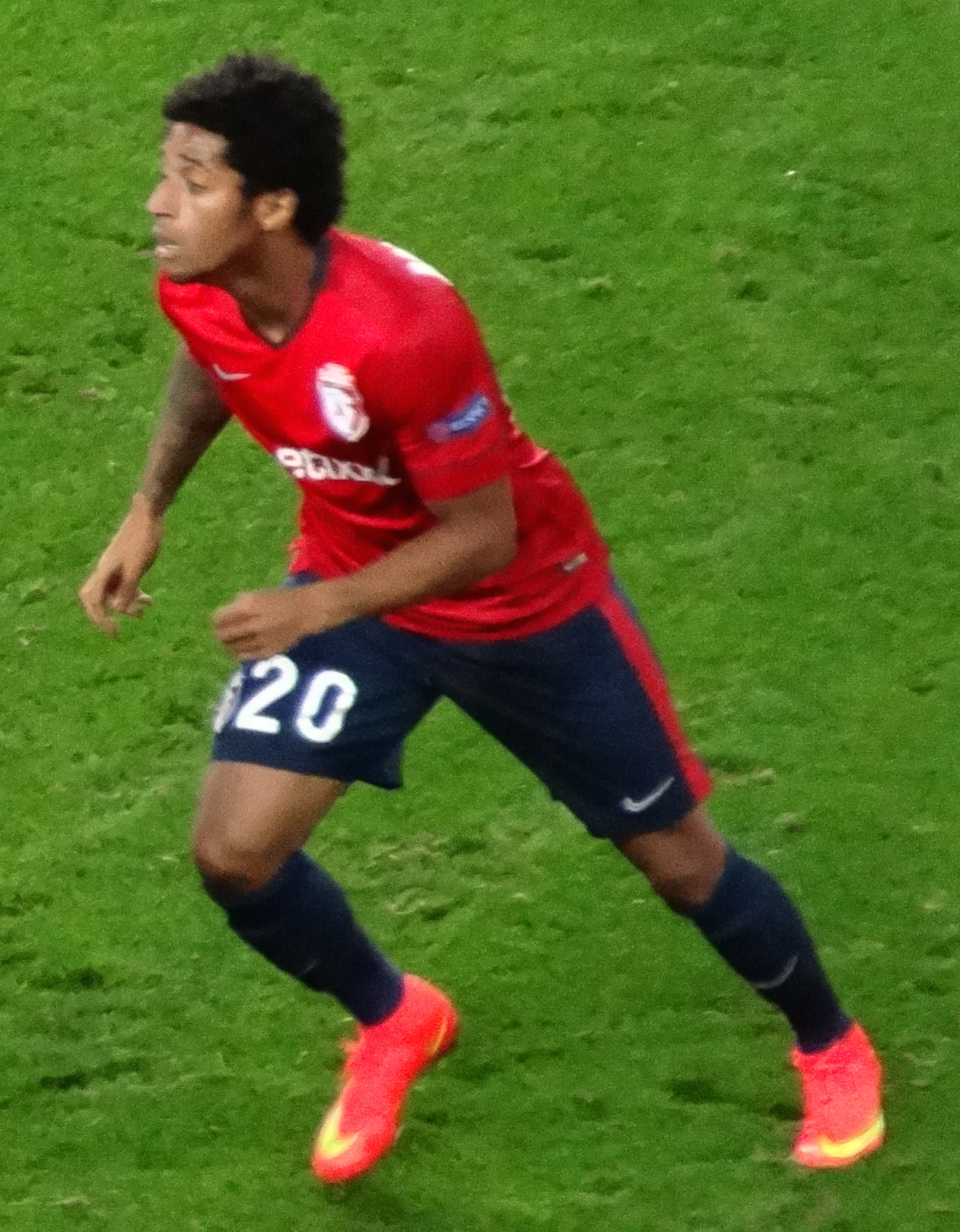
Mendes playing for Lille in 2014

On 1 September 2012, Mendes returned to Ligue 1 on a four-year deal at Lille. He joined for a €3 million fee – the club was in a good financial place after the sale of Eden Hazard to Chelsea – and his monthly salary rose from €7,000 to €120,000. He missed the second half of his first season after having surgery on a right ankle tendon and remained on the sidelines until December 2013. He told the league's website that he was not going to retire despite the injuries.

Mendes's opportunities at Lille were reduced after the dismissal of manager Rudi Garcia in 2013. On 4 September 2015, Mendes joined English side Nottingham Forest on a season-long loan. He scored his first goal for the club twenty days later, opening a 1–1 draw with Huddersfield Town.

=== Later career ===
On 31 January 2017, Mendes signed for Kayserispor – ranked 17th in Turkey's Süper Lig – until the summer of 2020.

In July 2018, he terminated his deal and moved to Sharjah FC of the UAE Pro League on a three-year deal. He won the league in his first season.

Remaining in the United Arab Emirates, Mendes moved to Al-Nasr SC in Dubai on a two-year contract in July 2020.

On 10 August 2023, he went back to Turkey's top division and signed a two-year contract with Fatih Karagümrük.

On 11 September 2025, he joined fellow Turkish side Iğdır, signing a one-year contract with an option to extend it for an additional year.

On 21 August 2026, he joined Moroccan side RS Berkane, signing a one-year contract with an option to extend it for an additional year.

== International career ==
Mendes was a member of the Cape Verde under-21 national team and played formerly with the under-16s an international tournament in Gonfreville-L'Orcher.

He made his debut for the senior team on 11 August 2010, as a 58th-minute substitute for Babanco in a 1–0 friendly loss away to Senegal. His first international goal was scored on 8 October 2011, in a 2–1 loss at Zimbabwe in 2012 Africa Cup of Nations qualification.

In 2013 Africa Cup of Nations qualification, Mendes scored three goals in two wins over Madagascar. At the finals in South Africa, Cape Verde's first major tournament, he played all four games of a run to the quarter-finals.

Mendes scored the decider on 10 September 2014 as Cape Verde won 2–1 against Zambia in Praia, in 2015 Africa Cup of Nations qualification. He was called up for the finals in Equatorial Guinea, playing in all three draws of a group-stage elimination.

In November 2020, he reached 50 international caps, for which he was rewarded with a shirt and plaque the following March. A year later, he was called up for the 2021 Africa Cup of Nations in Cameroon and appeared in two of Cape Verde's matches at the tournament.

On 17 November 2023, he played his 62nd international game in a 0–0 draw with Angola in 2026 World Cup qualification game, tying Babanco’s record to become Cape Verde joint most capped player. Four days later, in a 2–0 victory over Eswatini in a 2026 World Cup qualification game, he played his 63rd international game, becoming Cape Verde sole most capped player and scored his 15th international goal and tied Héldon Ramos record to become Cape Verde joint top goalscorer.

In December 2023, Mendes was named in Cape Verde's squad for his fourth Africa Cup of Nations – the 2023 tournament in the Ivory Coast.

He captained the team in their opening two matches of the tournament on 14 and 19 January 2024 – wins against Ghana (2–1), and Mozambique (3–0) – scoring and being named man of the match in the latter. The goal against Mozambique was his 16th international goal and he thus became Cape Verde's sole top goalscorer. He later scored the only goal from a penalty in a 1–0 victory over Mauritania, which qualified his country to the quarter-finals.

On 18 May 2026, Mendes was named in the 26-man squad for the 2026 FIFA World Cup, marking his country's first-ever participation in the tournament. He made his 100th international appearance for Cape Verde in a goalless draw against Saudi Arabia in the team's third World Cup group-stage match. He then provided an assist in a 3–2 extra-time defeat to Argentina in the round of 32.

== Personal life ==
Mendes was under investigation by police in New Zealand related to an alleged sexual assault in Auckland in March 2026 where his national team was playing during the FIFA Series. The complaint was filed in April, prompting authorities to open a formal inquiry into the matter.

In November 2026 New Zealand Police announced that he had been cleared in the investigation and his accuser was charged with making a false statement.

== Career statistics ==
=== Club ===
As of match played 6 November 2026

Appearances and goals by club, season and competition
Club	Season	League			National cup (Note: Includes Coupe de France, FA Cup, Turkish Cup, UAE President's Cup)		League cup (Note: Includes Coupe de la Ligue, EFL Cup, UAE League Cup)		Continental		Other		Total	
Club	Season	Division	Apps	Goals	Apps	Goals	Apps	Goals	Apps	Goals	Apps	Goals	Goals	Apps
Le Havre	2008–09	Ligue 1	1	0	0	0	0	0	—		—		1	0
Le Havre	2009–10	Ligue 2	14	0	0	0	1	0	—		—		15	0
Le Havre	2010–11	Ligue 2	32	4	0	0	2	0	—		—		34	4
Le Havre	2011–12	Ligue 2	34	13	3	1	2	2	—		—		39	16
Le Havre	2012–13	Ligue 2	3	2	0	0	0	0	—		—		3	2
Le Havre	Total		84	19	3	1	5	2	—		—		92	22
Le Havre II	2010–11	CFA	1	0	—		—		—		—		1	0
Lille	2012–13	Ligue 1	9	2	0	0	0	0	3 (Note: Appearance(s) in UEFA Champions League)	0	—		12	2
Lille	2013–14	Ligue 1	16	3	3	0	0	0	—		—		19	3
Lille	2014–15	Ligue 1	19	2	0	0	2	0	10 (Note: Four appearances, one goal in UEFA Champions League, six appearances in UEFA Europa League)	1	—		31	3
Lille	2015–16	Ligue 1	3	0	0	0	0	0	—		—		3	0
Lille	2016–17	Ligue 1	7	0	0	0	0	0	2 (Note: Appearance(s) in UEFA Europa League)	1	—		9	1
Lille	Total		54	7	3	0	2	0	15	2	—		74	9
Lille II	2013–14	CFA	1	0	—		—		—		—		1	0
Lille II	2016–17	CFA	1	0	—		—		—		—		1	0
Lille II	Total		2	0	—		—		—		—		2	0
Nottingham Forest (loan)	2015–16	Championship	32	2	0	0	0	0	—		—		32	2
Kayserispor	2016–17	Süper Lig	6	1	1	0	—		—		—		7	1
Kayserispor	2017–18	Süper Lig	33	4	6	3	—		—		—		39	7
Kayserispor	Total		39	5	7	3	—		—		—		46	8
Sharjah	2018–19	UAE Pro League	26	9	0	0	0	0	—		—		26	9
Sharjah	2019–20	UAE Pro League	18	11	0	0	3	1	2 (Note: Appearance(s) in AFC Champions League)	1	1 (Note: Appearance in UAE Super Cup)	0	24	13
Sharjah	Total		44	20	0	0	3	1	2	1	1	0	50	22
Al-Nasr	2020–21	UAE Pro League	22	6	0	0	5	1	—		—		27	7
Al-Nasr	2021–22	UAE Pro League	22	4	0	0	3	0	—		—		25	4
Al-Nasr	2022–23	UAE Pro League	24	5	0	0	4	1	—		—		28	6
Al-Nasr	Total		68	15	0	0	12	2	—		—		80	17
Fatih Karagümrük	2023–24	Süper Lig	23	4	3	2	—		—		—		26	6
Kocaelispor	2024–25	TFF First League	35	12	1	0	—		—		—		36	12
Kocaelispor	2025–26	Süper Lig	4	0	—		—		—		-		4	0
Kocaelispor	Total		39	12	1	0	—		—		–		40	12
Iğdır F.K.	2025–26	TFF First League	29	5	4	0	—		—		—		33	5
RS Berkane	2026–27	Botola Pro	4	0	0	0	1 (Note: Appearance in CAF Champions League)	0	0	0	—		5	0
Career total			414	90	21	6	22	5	18	3	1	0	475	104

=== International ===
As of match played 17 November 2026

Appearances and goals by national team and year
National team	Year	Apps	Goals
Cape Verde	2010	3	0
Cape Verde	2011	4	1
Cape Verde	2012	4	3
Cape Verde	2013	6	0
Cape Verde	2014	3	1
Cape Verde	2015	8	1
Cape Verde	2016	4	0
Cape Verde	2017	5	0
Cape Verde	2018	3	1
Cape Verde	2019	4	1
Cape Verde	2020	4	2
Cape Verde	2021	7	2
Cape Verde	2022	6 (Note: He featured in 2 unofficial FIFA matches: Guadeloupe (2022) and Malaysia (2025))	1
Cape Verde	2023	8	2
Cape Verde	2024	15	6
Cape Verde	2025	9	1
Cape Verde	2026	12	0
Total		105	22

Scores and results list Cape Verde's goal tally first, score column indicates score after each Mendes goal.

List of international goals scored by Ryan Mendes
No.	Date	Venue	Opponent	Score	Result	Competition	Ref.
1	8 October 2011	Estádio da Várzea, Praia, Cape Verde	Zimbabwe	2–0	2–1	2012 Africa Cup of Nations qualification	
2	29 February 2012	Mahamasina Municipal Stadium, Antananarivo, Madagascar	Madagascar	1–0	4–0	2013 Africa Cup of Nations qualification	
3	16 June 2012	Estádio da Várzea, Praia, Cape Verde	Madagascar	1–0	3–1	2013 Africa Cup of Nations qualification	
4	16 June 2012	Estádio da Várzea, Praia, Cape Verde	Madagascar	3–0	3–1	2013 Africa Cup of Nations qualification	
5	10 September 2014	Estádio Nacional de Cabo Verde, Praia, Cape Verde	Zambia	2–1	2–1	2015 Africa Cup of Nations qualification	
6	6 September 2015	Petrosport Stadium, New Cairo, Egypt	Libya	2–1	2–1	2017 Africa Cup of Nations qualification	
7	1 June 2018	Stade du 5 Juillet, Algiers, Algeria	Algeria	2–2	3–2	Friendly	
8	18 November 2019	Estádio Nacional de Cabo Verde, Praia, Cape Verde	Mozambique	2–1	2–2	2021 Africa Cup of Nations qualification	
9	7 October 2020	Estadi Nacional, Andorra la Vella, Andorra	Andorra	1–0	2–1	Friendly	
10	7 October 2020	Estadi Nacional, Andorra la Vella, Andorra	Andorra	2–1	2–1	Friendly	
11	26 March 2021	Estádio Nacional de Cabo Verde, Praia, Cape Verde	Cameroon	3–1	3–1	2021 Africa Cup of Nations qualification	
12	10 October 2021	Estádio Municipal Adérito Sena, Mindelo, Cape Verde	Liberia	1–0	1–0	2022 FIFA World Cup qualification	
13	23 September 2022	Bahrain National Stadium, Riffa, Bahrain	Bahrain	2–0	2–1	Friendly	
14	28 March 2023	Mbombela Stadium, Mbombela, South Africa	Eswatini	1–0	1–0	2023 Africa Cup of Nations qualification	
15	21 November 2023	Mbombela Stadium, Mbombela, South Africa	Eswatini	1–0	2–0	2026 FIFA World Cup qualification	
16	19 January 2024	Felix Houphouet Boigny Stadium, Abidjan, Ivory Coast	Mozambique	2–0	3–0	2023 Africa Cup of Nations	
17	29 January 2024	Felix Houphouet Boigny Stadium, Abidjan, Ivory Coast	Mauritania	1–0	1–0	2023 Africa Cup of Nations	
18	21 March 2024	Prince Abdullah Al-Faisal Sports City, Jeddah, Saudi Arabia	Guyana	1–0	1–0	2024 FIFA Series: Saudi Arabia A	
19	10 September 2024	Estádio Nacional de Cabo Verde, Praia, Cape Verde	Mauritania	1–0	2–0	2025 Africa Cup of Nations qualification	
20	10 September 2024	Estádio Nacional de Cabo Verde, Praia, Cape Verde	Mauritania	2–0	2–0	2025 Africa Cup of Nations qualification	
21	15 November 2024	Estádio Nacional de Cabo Verde, Praia, Cape Verde	Egypt	1–1	1–1	2025 Africa Cup of Nations qualification	
22	8 June 2025	Ramaz Shengelia Stadium, Kutaisi, Georgia	Georgia	1–1	1–1	Friendly	

== Honours ==
Sharjah

- UAE Pro League: 2018–19

Kocaelispor

- TFF 1. Lig: 2024–25 TFF First League

Cape Verde

- FIFA Series: 2024

== See also ==
- List of men's footballers with 100 or more international caps
- List of top international men's football goalscorers by country
