= Welinton (footballer, born 1989) =

Brazilian footballer

Personal information
- Full name: Welinton Souza Silva
- Date of birth: 10 April 1989 (age 37)
- Place of birth: Rio de Janeiro, Brazil
- Height: 1.81 m (5 ft 11 in)
- Position: Centre-back

Youth career
- 2007–2009: Flamengo

Senior career*
Years	Team	Apps	(Gls)
2009–2016	Flamengo	126	(4)
2013	→ Alania Vladikavkaz (loan)	10	(1)
2014–2015	→ Coritiba (loan)	38	(0)
2015–2016	→ Umm Salal (loan)	24	(3)
2016–2017	Al-Khor	23	(1)
2017–2020	Alanyaspor	72	(7)
2020–2023	Beşiktaş	72	(1)
2023–2025	Pendikspor	41	(3)

International career
2009	Brazil U20	8	(0)
- * Club domestic league appearances and goals as of 2 March 2025

Welinton Souza Silva (born 10 April 1989), or simply Welinton, is a Brazilian professional footballer who plays as a centre-back.

== Career ==
=== Flamengo ===
Born in Rio de Janeiro, Welinton debuted, as starter, playing in the first round match of 2009 Copa do Brasil win 5–0 against Ivinhema.

== Career statistics ==
As of match played 17 January 2024

Appearances and goals by club, season and competition
Club	Season	League			State league (Note: Includes Campeonato Carioca, Campeonato Paranaense)		National cup (Note: Includes Copa do Brasil, Turkish Cup)		Continental		Other		Total	
Club	Season	Division	Apps	Goals	Apps	Goals	Apps	Goals	Apps	Goals	Apps	Goals	Apps	Goals
Flamengo	2009	Série A	22	0	6	0	5	0	0	0	–		33	0
Flamengo	2010	Série A	16	1	2	0	–		0	0	–		18	1
Flamengo	2011	Série A	32	1	17	0	6	0	2 (Note: Appearances in Copa Sudamericana)	0	–		57	1
Flamengo	2012	Série A	17	0	11	0	0	0	7 (Note: Appearances in Copa Libertadores)	1	–		35	1
Flamengo	2013	Série A	1	0	–		–		–		–		1	0
Flamengo	2014	Série A	–		2	2	–		1	0	–		3	2
Flamengo	Total		88	2	38	2	11	0	10	1	–		147	5
Spartak Vladikavkaz (loan)	2012–13	Russian Premier League	10	1	–		–		–		–		10	1
Coritiba (loan)	2014	Série A	20	0	–		1	0	–		–		21	0
Coritiba (loan)	2015	Série A	6	0	12	0	3	0	–		–		21	0
Coritiba (loan)	Total		26	0	12	0	4	0	–		–		42	0
Umm Salal (loan)	2015–16	Qatar Stars League	24	3	–		0	0	–		–		24	3
Al-Khor	2016–17	Qatar Stars League	23	1	–		0	0	–		–		23	1
Alanyaspor	2017–18	Süper Lig	29	4	–		2	0	–		–		31	4
Alanyaspor	2018–19	Süper Lig	20	1	–		3	0	–		–		23	1
Alanyaspor	2019–20	Süper Lig	23	2	–		4	1	–		–		27	3
Alanyaspor	Total		72	7	–		9	1	–		–		81	8
Beşiktaş	2020–21	Süper Lig	35	1	–		4	0	2 (Note: One appearance in UEFA Champions League, one appearance in UEFA Europa League)	0	–		41	1
Beşiktaş	2021–22	Süper Lig	23	0	–		2	0	4 (Note: Appearances in UEFA Europa League)	0	1 (Note: Appearance in Turkish Super Cup)	0	30	0
Beşiktaş	2022–23	Süper Lig	14	0	–		1	0	–		–		15	0
Beşiktaş	Total		72	1	–		7	0	6	0	1	0	86	1
Pendikspor	2023–24	Süper Lig	14	2	–		1	0	–		–		15	2
Career total			329	17	50	2	32	1	16	1	1	0	428	21

== Honours ==
Flamengo

- Campeonato Brasileiro Série A: 2009
- Campeonato Carioca: 2009, 2011, 2014

Beşiktaş

- Süper Lig: 2020–21
- Turkish Cup: 2020–21
- Turkish Super Cup: 2021

Brazil U20

- South American Youth Championship: 2009
