= Javi Montero =

Spanish footballer

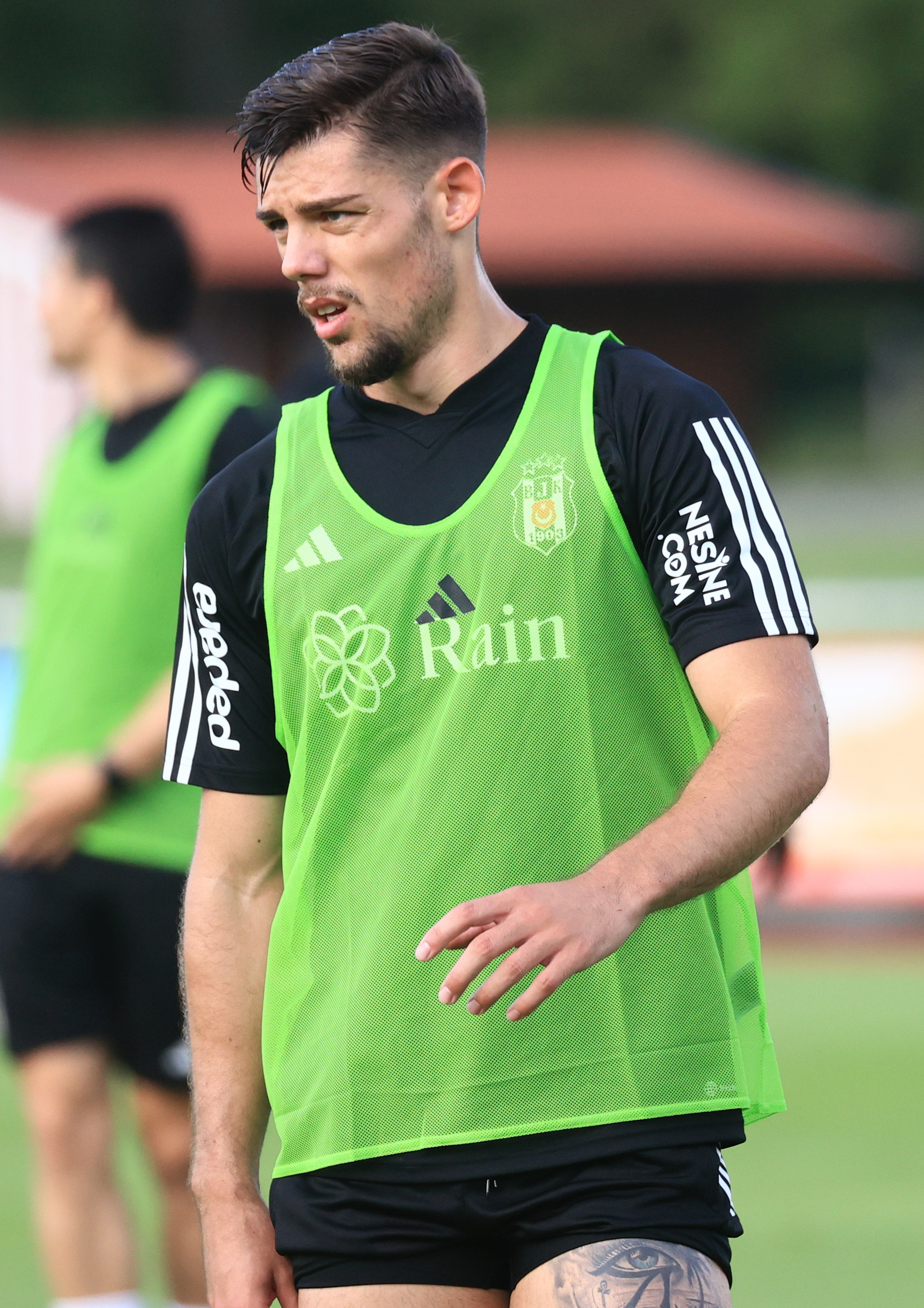
- Montero with Beşiktaş in 2023

Personal information
- Full name: Francisco Javier Montero Rubio
- Date of birth: 14 January 1999 (age 27)
- Place of birth: Seville, Spain
- Height: 1.85 m (6 ft 1 in)
- Position: Defender

Team information
- Current team: Leganés
- Number: 3

Youth career
- Nervión
- 2014–2018: Atlético Madrid

Senior career*
Years	Team	Apps	(Gls)
2018–2019	Atlético Madrid B	17	(0)
2018–2021	Atlético Madrid	9	(0)
2019–2020	→ Deportivo La Coruña (loan)	30	(0)
2020–2021	→ Beşiktaş (loan)	13	(0)
2021–2024	Beşiktaş	20	(1)
2023	→ Hamburger SV (loan)	4	(0)
2023–2024	→ Arouca (loan)	29	(1)
2024–2025	Racing Santander	25	(1)
2025–2026	Málaga	25	(1)
2026–	Leganés	2	(0)

International career
2019	Spain U21	1	(0)
- * Club domestic league appearances and goals as of 21:46, 29 September 2026 (UTC)

Francisco Javier "Javi" Montero Rubio (born 14 January 1999) is a Spanish professional footballer who plays for Segunda División club Leganés. Mainly a central defender, he can also play as a left-back.

== Club career ==
=== Atlético Madrid ===
Born in Seville, Andalusia, Montero joined Atlético Madrid's youth setup in 2014 at the age of 15, from hometown club AD Nervión. In 2018, after finishing his development, he was called up to the first team by manager Diego Simeone for the pre-season, playing with protective glasses due to an eye injury suffered back in 2017.

Montero made his senior debut with the reserves on 23 September 2018, starting in a 4–2 Segunda División B away win against CDA Navalcarnero. He first appeared with the main squad on 30 October, playing the full 90 minutes in a 1–0 away defeat of UE Sant Andreu in the round of 32 of the Copa del Rey.

Montero's first UEFA Champions League match occurred on 6 November 2018, when he came on as a half-time substitute for the injured José María Giménez in a 2–0 home victory over Borussia Dortmund in the group stage. He completed a trio of debuts four days later, when he started and was replaced by Gelson Martins early into the second half of an eventual 3–2 La Liga win against Athletic Bilbao also at the Metropolitano Stadium.

On 2 September 2019, Montero renewed his contract until 2024, and was immediately loaned to Deportivo de La Coruña for the season. He started in all his appearances but one during his spell in Galicia, but his side suffered relegation from Segunda División.

=== Beşiktaş ===
Montero joined Beşiktaş J.K. on a season-long loan on 2 September 2020. One year later, he signed a permanent deal.

On 15 January 2023, Montero was loaned to German 2. Bundesliga club Hamburger SV until the end of the campaign. In August 2023, also on loan, he moved to F.C. Arouca of the Portuguese Primeira Liga; he was the fourth Spaniard to join the latter under new manager Daniel Ramos in a month, in a squad already with two other compatriots.

=== Racing Santander ===
On 13 August 2024, the free agent Montero returned to Spain, on a two-year contract at second-tier Racing de Santander. He scored his only goal on 16 November, closing the 2–0 home win over Burgos CF.

Montero left the Campos de Sport de El Sardinero by mutual agreement on 4 August 2025.

=== Málaga ===
Hours after leaving Racing, Montero was announced at fellow second-division club Málaga CF on a one-year deal. He totalled 30 games during his only season in a top-flight promotion, scoring in the 3–3 draw away to FC Andorra on 1 April 2026.

=== Leganés ===
On 29 August 2026, Montero agreed to a two-year contract at CD Leganés.

== International career ==
Montero won his only cap for Spain at under-21 level on 10 October 2019, featuring 17 minutes in a 1–1 friendly draw with Germany held in Córdoba.

== Career statistics ==
As of match played 12 May 2024

Appearances and goals by club, season and competition
Club	Season	League			National cup		League cup		Continental		Other		Total	
Club	Season	Division	Apps	Goals	Apps	Goals	Apps	Goals	Apps	Goals	Apps	Goals	Apps	Goals
Atlético Madrid B	2018–19	Segunda División B	17	0	—		—		—		2 (Note: Appearances in Segunda División B play-offs)	0	19	0
Atlético Madrid	2018–19	La Liga	9	0	3	0	—		2 (Note: Appearances in UEFA Champions League)	0	—		14	0
Deportivo (loan)	2019–20	Segunda División	30	0	1	0	—		—		—		31	0
Beşiktaş (loan)	2020–21	Süper Lig	13	0	3	0	—		1 (Note: Appearance in UEFA Europa League)	0	—		17	0
Beşiktaş	2021–22	Süper Lig	17	1	3	0	—		4	1	1 (Note: Appearance in Turkish Super Cup)	0	25	2
Beşiktaş	2022–23	Süper Lig	3	0	1	0	—		—		—		4	0
Beşiktaş	Total		33	1	7	0	—		5	1	1	0	46	2
Hamburger SV (loan)	2022–23	2. Bundesliga	4	0	0	0	—		—		1 (Note: Appearance in 2. Bundesliga promotion play-offs)	0	5	0
Arouca (loan)	2023–24	Primeira Liga	29	1	3	0	2	0	0	0	—		34	1
Career total			122	2	14	0	2	0	7	1	4	0	149	3

== Honours ==
Beşiktaş

- Süper Lig: 2020–21
- Turkish Cup: 2020–21
- Turkish Super Cup: 2021
