= Necip Uysal =

Turkish footballer (born 1991)

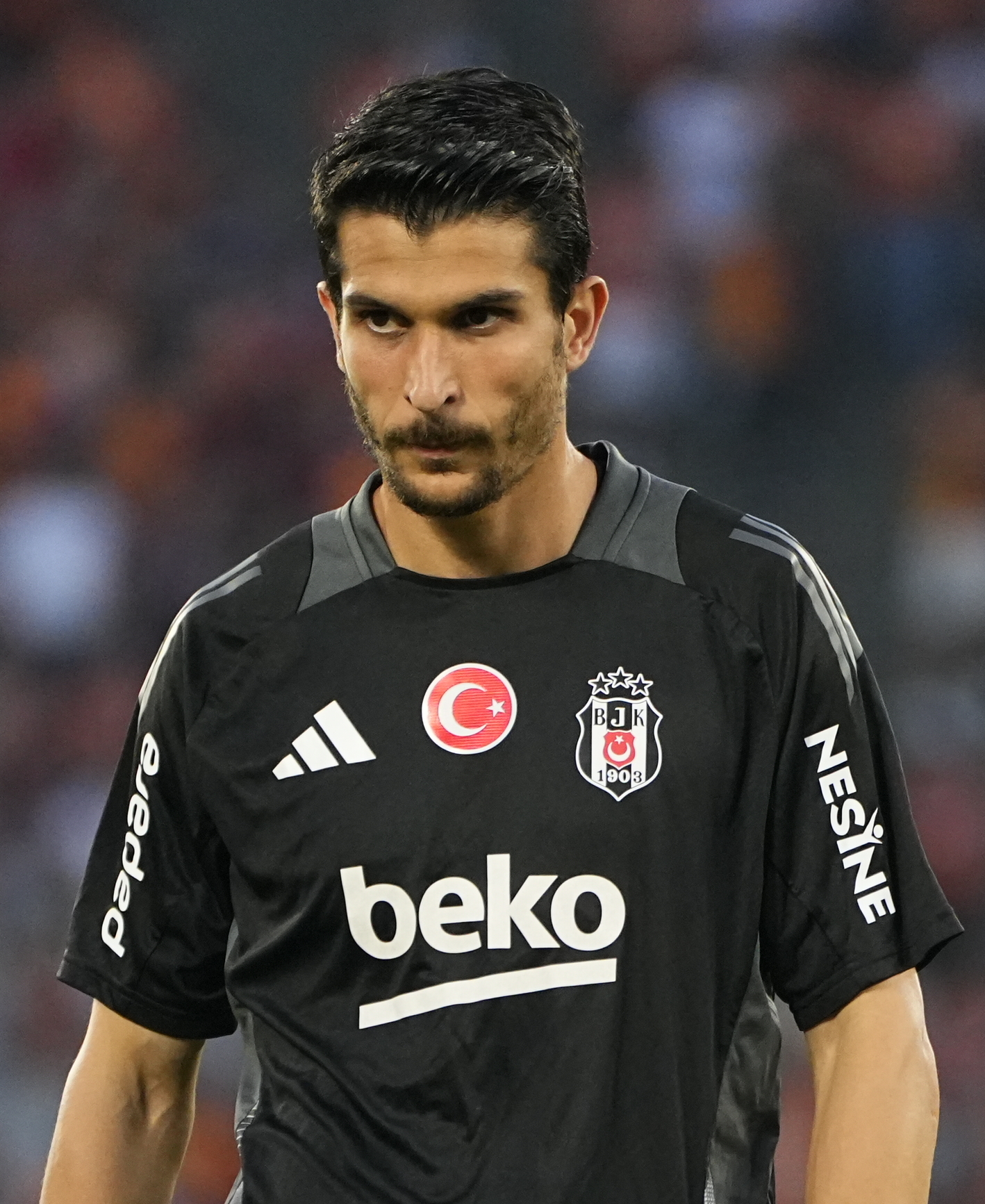
- Uysal playing for Beşiktaş in 2024

Personal information
- Full name: Necip Uysal
- Date of birth: 24 January 1991 (age 35)
- Place of birth: Bakırköy, Istanbul, Turkey
- Height: 1.80 m (5 ft 11 in)
- Position: Midfielder

Youth career
- 2001–2004: Yıldırım Bosnaspor
- 2004–2009: Beşiktaş

Senior career*
Years	Team	Apps	(Gls)
2009–2026	Beşiktaş	337	(4)

International career
2008–2009	Turkey U18	12	(0)
2009–2010	Turkey U19	11	(1)
2009–2012	Turkey U21	19	(0)
2012–2013	Turkey U23	10	(0)
2010	Turkey	1	(0)
- * Club domestic league appearances and goals

Necip Uysal (Turkish pronunciation: [nedʒip ujsaɫ], born 24 January 1991) is a Turkish former professional footballer who played as a midfielder. He spent his entire career with Süper Lig club Beşiktaş.

== Club career ==
Uysal started his footballing career with amateur side Yıldırım Bosnaspor in 2001. He spent three years with the club before being transferred to Beşiktaş. Uysal made his professional debut during the 2009–10 Süper Lig season.

On 17 February 2025, he extended his contract until 2027. On 18 May 2026, he announced his retirement at end of the 2025–26 season.

== International career ==
Uysal is a youth international of Turkey, and he made his senior debut on 3 March 2010 during the 2–0 victory against Honduras.

== Personal life ==
Uysal is of Kosovar Albanian descent.

== Career statistics ==
=== Club ===
Appearances and goals by club, season and competition
Club	Season	League			Turkish Cup		Europe		Other		Total	
Club	Season	Division	Apps	Goals	Apps	Goals	Apps	Goals	Apps	Goals	Apps	Goals
Beşiktaş	2009–10	Süper Lig	11	0	3	0	0	0	0	0	14	0
Beşiktaş	2010–11	Süper Lig	24	1	6	0	11 (Note: Appearances in UEFA Europa League)	1	–		41	2
Beşiktaş	2011–12	Süper Lig	29	0	2	0	8	0	–		39	0
Beşiktaş	2012–13	Süper Lig	26	1	4	0	—		–		30	1
Beşiktaş	2013–14	Süper Lig	23	0	0	0	–		–		23	0
Beşiktaş	2014–15	Süper Lig	20	0	5	1	12 (Note: Four appearances in UEFA Champions League, eight appearances in UEFA Europa League)	0	–		37	1
Beşiktaş	2015–16	Süper Lig	29	1	8	0	6	0	–		43	1
Beşiktaş	2016–17	Süper Lig	17	0	3	0	6 (Note: One appearance in UEFA Champions League, five appearances in UEFA Europa League)	0	1 (Note: Appearance in Turkish Super Cup)	0	27	0
Beşiktaş	2017–18	Süper Lig	13	0	3	0	4 (Note: Appearances in UEFA Champions League)	0	0	0	20	0
Beşiktaş	2018–19	Süper Lig	18	0	0	0	11	0	–		29	0
Beşiktaş	2019–20	Süper Lig	15	0	3	0	5	0	–		23	0
Beşiktaş	2020–21	Süper Lig	29	1	5	0	2 (Note: One appearance in UEFA Champions League, one appearance in UEFA Europa League)	0	–		36	1
Beşiktaş	2021–22	Süper Lig	27	0	1	0	3	0	0	0	31	0
Beşiktaş	2022–23	Süper Lig	21	0	3	0	–		–		24	0
Beşiktaş	2023–24	Süper Lig	30	0	6	0	7 (Note: Appearances in UEFA Europa Conference League)	0	–		43	0
Beşiktaş	2024–25	Süper Lig	3	0	0	0	0	0	–		3	0
Beşiktaş	2025–26	Süper Lig	2	0	0	0	1 (Note: One appearance in UEFA Europa League)	0	–		3	0
Career total			337	4	52	1	76	1	1	0	466	6

=== International ===
As of match played 3 March 2010

Appearances and goals by national team and year
National team	Year	Apps	Goals
Turkey	2010	1	0
Total		1	0

== Honours ==
Beşiktaş

- Süper Lig: 2008–09, 2015–16, 2016–17, 2020–21
- Turkish Cup: 2008–09, 2010–11, 2020–21, 2023–24
- Turkish Super Cup: 2021, 2024
