= Rıdvan Yılmaz =

Turkish footballer

- Yılmaz with Rangers in 2025

Personal information
- Date of birth: 21 May 2001 (age 25)
- Place of birth: Gaziosmanpaşa, Istanbul, Turkey
- Height: 1.74 m (5 ft 9 in)
- Position: Left-back

Team information
- Current team: Beşiktaş
- Number: 33

Youth career
- 2009–2019: Beşiktaş

Senior career*
Years	Team	Apps	(Gls)
2019–2022	Beşiktaş	52	(4)
2022–2025	Rangers	52	(1)
2025–	Beşiktaş	36	(1)

International career^{‡}
2016–2017	Turkey U16	10	(0)
2017–2018	Turkey U17	14	(0)
2018–2019	Turkey U18	15	(1)
2019–2020	Turkey U19	6	(0)
2020–2021	Turkey U21	5	(0)
2021–	Turkey	7	(0)
- * Club domestic league appearances and goals as of 22:45, 22 November 2026 (UTC) ‡ National team caps and goals as of 23:18, 22 March 2024 (UTC)

Rıdvan Yılmaz (born 21 May 2001) is a Turkish professional footballer who plays as a left-back for Turkish club Beşiktaş and the Turkey national team.

Yılmaz is a graduate of the Beşiktaş youth academy. He made 62 first-team appearances for Beşiktaş, helping them win the domestic league and cup double in the 2020–21 season. In July 2022, he joined Rangers for an initial transfer fee of £3.4 million.

Yılmaz made 50 appearances for Turkey's youth national teams, from under-16 to under-21 level. He made his senior international debut in May 2021, and was a member of Turkey's squad at UEFA Euro 2020.

== Club career ==
=== Beşiktaş ===
Yılmaz was born in Gaziosmanpaşa, Istanbul. He spent 10 years of his youth career in the academy of Beşiktaş, which he joined at the age of seven. Yılmaz made his professional debut with Beşiktaş as a late substitute in a 7–2 Süper Lig win over Çaykur Rizespor on 8 April 2019. In the 2020–21 season, he won the Süper Lig and Turkish Cup with Beşiktaş.

=== Rangers ===
On 25 July 2022, Yılmaz joined Scottish club Rangers on a five-year deal for an initial transfer fee of £3.4 million, with the deal containing add-ons that could raise the fee to £5.3 million. He made his debut for the club as a substitute against Belgian team Union Saint-Gilloise, during a UEFA Champions League qualifier loss on 2 August.

Yılmaz suffered a serious hamstring injury in a Scottish Premiership match against Aberdeen in October. After more than four months, he returned to the Rangers first-team as a substitute in a Scottish Cup game against Raith Rovers in March 2023.

=== Return to Beşiktaş ===
On 23 August 2025, Yilmaz re-joined Beşiktaş for an undisclosed fee.

== International career ==
Yılmaz played youth international football for Turkey at under-16, under-17, under-18, under-19 and under-21 levels, making 50 appearances in total.

In May 2021, Yılmaz was called up to the senior Turkey national football team's preliminary 30-man squad for UEFA Euro 2020. He made his senior international debut on 27 May 2021, in a warm-up friendly against Azerbaijan. He was included in Turkey's final 26-man squad for Euro 2020.

== Career statistics ==
=== Club ===
As of match played 19 September 2026

Appearances and goals by club, season and competition
Club	Season	League			National cup (Note: Includes Turkish Cup, Scottish Cup)		League cup (Note: Includes Scottish League Cup)		Continental		Other		Total	
Club	Season	Division	Apps	Goals	Apps	Goals	Apps	Goals	Apps	Goals	Apps	Goals	Apps	Goals
Beşiktaş	2018–19	Süper Lig	1	0	0	0	—		0	0	—		1	0
Beşiktaş	2019–20	Süper Lig	6	0	1	0	—		0	0	—		7	0
Beşiktaş	2020–21	Süper Lig	18	1	2	0	—		1 (Note: Appearance(s) in UEFA Europa League)	0	—		21	1
Beşiktaş	2021–22	Süper Lig	27	3	3	0	—		2 (Note: Appearances in UEFA Champions League)	0	1 (Note: Appearance in Turkish Super Cup)	0	33	3
Beşiktaş	2025–26	Süper Lig	25	0	5	0	—		0	0	—		30	0
Beşiktaş	2026–27	Süper Lig	4	1	0	0	—		5 (Note: Appearances in UEFA Europa League qualifying)	0	—		8	1
Beşiktaş	Beşiktaş total		81	5	11	0	—		8	0	1	0	101	5
Rangers	2022–23	Scottish Premiership	9	0	2	0	2	0	2	0	—		15	0
Rangers	2023–24	Scottish Premiership	26	1	4	0	1	1	2	0	—		33	2
Rangers	2024–25	Scottish Premiership	17	0	2	0	1	0	9 (Note: Two appearances in UEFA Champions League, five appearances in UEFA Europa League)	0	—		29	0
Rangers	Rangers total		52	1	8	0	4	1	13	0	—		77	2
Career total			133	6	19	0	4	1	21	0	1	0	178	7

=== International ===
As of match played 22 March 2024

Appearances and goals by national team and year
National team	Year	Apps	Goals
Turkey	2021	5	0
Turkey	2022	1	0
Turkey	2024	1	0
Total		7	0

== Honours ==
Beşiktaş

- Süper Lig: 2020–21
- Turkish Cup: 2020–21
- Turkish Super Cup: 2021

Rangers

- Scottish League Cup: 2023–24
