= Rachid Ghezzal =

Algeria international footballer (born 1992)

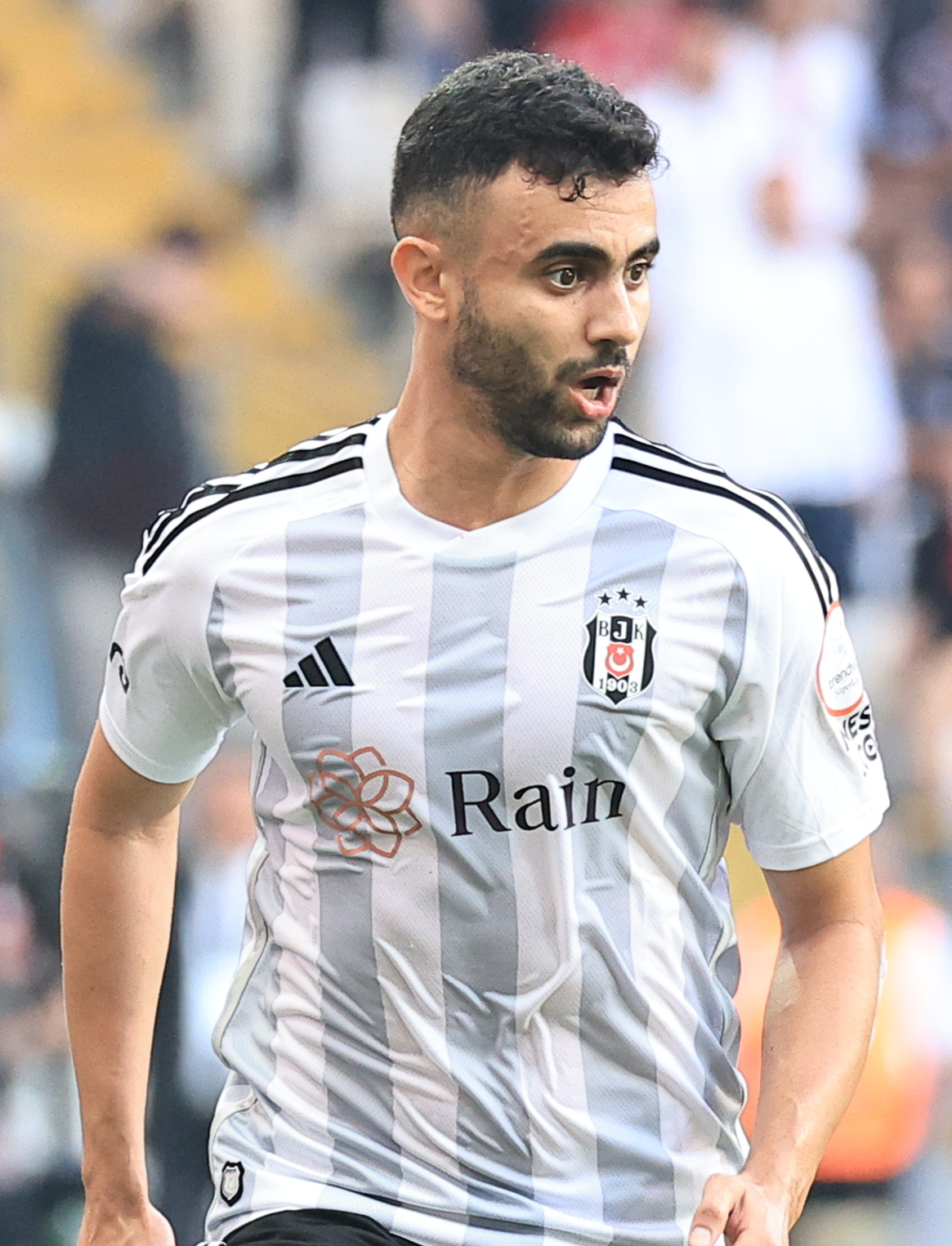
- Ghezzal with Beşiktaş in 2023

Personal information
- Full name: Rachid Ghezzal
- Date of birth: 9 May 1992 (age 34)
- Place of birth: Décines-Charpieu, France
- Height: 1.82 m (6 ft 0 in)
- Position: Winger

Youth career
- 1998–2004: Vaulx-en-Velin
- 2004–2012: Lyon

Senior career*
Years	Team	Apps	(Gls)
2010–2017	Lyon B	54	(11)
2012–2017	Lyon	87	(11)
2017–2018	Monaco	26	(2)
2018–2021	Leicester City	19	(1)
2019–2020	→ Fiorentina (loan)	19	(1)
2020–2021	→ Beşiktaş (loan)	31	(8)
2021–2024	Beşiktaş	73	(7)
2024–2025	Çaykur Rizespor	23	(4)
2025–2026	Lyon	10	(0)

International career^{‡}
2013	France U20	4	(1)
2015–2022	Algeria	22	(2)
- * Club domestic league appearances and goals as of 09:13, 21 April 2026 (UTC) ‡ National team caps and goals as of 23:10, 12 June 2022 (UTC)

Rachid Ghezzal (Arabic: رَشِيد غَزَال; born 9 May 1992) is an Algerian professional footballer who plays as a winger. Born in France, he represents the Algeria national team.

Ghezzal began his career at Lyon, where he made his debut in October 2012. He played 119 games and scored 13 goals for the side across all competitions. In August 2017, he moved to Monaco on a free transfer. After a season at Monaco, he was sold to Leicester City as a replacement for compatriot Riyad Mahrez. Ghezzal failed to nail down a first-team spot at Leicester in his first season, leading him to go on loan to Fiorentina in his second season and Beşiktaş in his third. He signed permanently for Beşiktaş in 2021. In December 2023, Ghezzal was excluded from the first-team at Beşiktaş.

Ghezzal represented France at under-20 level. He made his senior debut for Algeria in 2015, and was part of their squad at the 2017 Africa Cup of Nations.

== Club career ==
=== Lyon ===
Born in Décines-Charpieu, Metropolitan Lyon, in July 2010 Ghezzal signed a five-year élite contract with Lyon. After featuring with the club's reserve team in the Championnat de France Amateur for two consecutive seasons, ahead of the 2012–13 season, he was promoted to the senior team by manager Rémi Garde and assigned the number 31 shirt. Ghezzal made his senior team debut on 4 October 2012 in a UEFA Europa League group stage away match against Israeli club Ironi Kiryat Shmona; he started the match as Lyon won the contest 4–3.

In the 2013–14 season, Ghezzal suffered a back injury for the first six months of Lyon's campaign, which saw him out of action until 10 January 2014, missing 32 of Lyon's games in the process. He then returned to the squad but did not make any appearances for Lyon for the rest of the season; either being not named in match day squads or being named on the bench. Since January 2016, he had been playing regularly. He finished the 2015–16 season with 8 goals and 8 assists in 29 Ligue 1 matches. In June 2017, Lyon announced that Ghezzal's contract would not be renewed.

=== Monaco ===
On 7 August 2017, Ghezzal joined fellow Ligue 1 team Monaco by signing a four-year contract that would run until June 2021. It was reported that Monaco would pay him a signing bonus of €3 million and a monthly salary of about €180,000. As his Lyon contract had expired on 30 June 2017, he arrived on a free transfer.

=== Leicester City ===
On 5 August 2018, Ghezzal signed for English Premier League club Leicester City as a direct replacement for outgoing fellow countryman Riyad Mahrez, signing a four-year deal. In his first start for the club, he scored his first Leicester goal, a long range strike from outside the box, in a 4–0 win over Fleetwood Town.

==== Fiorentina (loan) ====
On 2 September 2019, Ghezzal was loaned to Italian Serie A side ACF Fiorentina on a season-long deal that included an option to buy.

==== Beşiktaş (loan) ====
On 5 September 2020, Ghezzal joined Turkish Süper Lig club Beşiktaş on a season-long loan. On 15 May 2021, he scored a penalty in a 2–1 away win over Göztepe, to secure the 2020–21 Süper Lig title for Beşiktaş.

=== Beşiktaş ===
On 12 August 2021, Beşiktaş announced the signing of Ghezzal from Leicester City on a three-year deal.

On 11 December 2023, it was officially announced that Ghezzal has been excluded from the squad along with Vincent Aboubakar, Valentin Rosier, Eric Bailly and Jean Onana due to poor performance and incompatibility within the team.

On 6 January 2024, Ghezzal has been pardoned and included in the squad for the upcoming game against Kasımpaşa.

On 2 June 2024, Ghezzal announced his farewell to Beşiktaş with a post on his social media account.

=== Return to Lyon ===
On 5 September 2025, Lyon announced the return of Ghezzal to the club on a free transfer. He signed a one-year contract with Les Gones until June 2026 and will take on the role of supporting the club's young players.

== International career ==
At international senior level, Ghezzal was eligible to represent both France and Algeria and had stated his preference is to represent the latter nation. In 2013, he received the call from France U20 to compete in the Toulon Tournament. However, Ghezzal later chose to play for Algeria, scoring his first goal in March 2016 against Ethiopia.

== Philanthropy ==
On 9 December 2018, Ghezzal appeared on a Sport dans la Ville digital philanthropy card. The digital philanthropy card featured the French non-profit, serving disadvantaged kids through sports and job training. It was his tribute to the organization of which he was part until the age of 12 years. During a meeting on 31 December 2013 with young members of Sport dans la Ville, Rachid explained the time he spent with Sport dans la Ville allowed him to reach the status of professional player.

== Personal life ==
He's the younger brother of Algerian international Abdelkader Ghezzal.

== Career statistics ==
=== Club ===
As of match played 12 April 2026

Appearances and goals by club, season and competition
Club	Season	League			National cup (Note: Includes Coupe de France, FA Cup, Coppa Italia, Turkish Cup)		League cup (Note: Includes Coupe de la Ligue, EFL Cup)		Europe		Other		Total	
Club	Season	Division	Apps	Goals	Apps	Goals	Apps	Goals	Apps	Goals	Apps	Goals	Apps	Goals
Lyon B	2010–11	CFA	14	4	—		—		—		—		14	4
Lyon B	2011–12	CFA	21	4	—		—		—		—		21	4
Lyon B	2012–13	CFA	6	0	—		—		—		—		6	0
Lyon B	2013–14	CFA	10	1	—		—		—		—		10	1
Lyon B	2014–15	CFA	1	0	—		—		—		—		1	0
Lyon B	2015–16	CFA	1	1	—		—		—		—		1	1
Lyon B	2016–17	CFA	1	1	—		—		—		—		1	1
Lyon B	Total		54	11	—		—		—		—		54	11
Lyon	2012–13	Ligue 1	14	1	1	0	1	0	4 (Note: Appearance(s) in UEFA Europa League)	0	—		20	1
Lyon	2013–14	Ligue 1	0	0	0	0	0	0	0	0	—		0	0
Lyon	2014–15	Ligue 1	18	0	2	0	1	0	2	0	—		23	0
Lyon	2015–16	Ligue 1	29	8	2	2	2	0	4 (Note: Appearances in UEFA Champions League)	0	1 (Note: Appearance in Trophée des Champions)	0	38	10
Lyon	2016–17	Ligue 1	26	2	1	0	0	0	11 (Note: Five appearances in UEFA Champions League, six appearances and one goal in UEFA Europa League)	1	0	0	38	3
Lyon	Total		87	11	6	2	4	0	21	1	1	0	119	14
Monaco	2017–18	Ligue 1	26	2	2	0	3	0	4	0	—		35	2
Leicester City	2018–19	Premier League	19	1	1	1	3	1	—		—		23	3
Fiorentina (loan)	2019–20	Serie A	19	1	2	0	—		—		—		21	1
Beşiktaş (loan)	2020–21	Süper Lig	31	8	4	0	—		—		—		35	8
Beşiktaş	2021–22	Süper Lig	35	4	3	0	—		5	1	0	0	43	5
Beşiktaş	2022–23	Süper Lig	11	2	0	0	—		—		—		11	2
Beşiktaş	2023–24	Süper Lig	27	1	5	1	—		2 (Note: Appearances in UEFA Europa Conference League)	0	—		34	2
Beşiktaş	Total		104	15	12	1	—		7	1	—		123	17
Rizespor	2024–25	Süper Lig	23	4	2	0	—		—		—		25	4
Lyon	2025–26	Ligue 1	10	0	1	0	—		1	0	—		12	0
Career total			342	45	26	4	10	1	33	2	1	0	412	52

=== International ===
As of match played 12 June 2022

Appearances and goals by national team and year
National team	Year	Apps	Goals
Algeria	2015	3	0
Algeria	2016	4	1
Algeria	2017	6	0
Algeria	2018	3	0
Algeria	2019	0	0
Algeria	2020	0	0
Algeria	2021	3	1
Algeria	2022	3	0
Total		22	2

Scores and results list Algeria's goal tally first, score column indicates score after each Ghezzal goal.

List of international goals scored by Rachid Ghezzal
No.	Date	Venue	Opponent	Score	Result	Competition
1	23 March 2016	Stade Mustapha Tchaker, Blida, Algeria	Ethiopia	6–0	7–1	2017 Africa Cup of Nations qualification
2	25 March 2021	National Heroes Stadium, Lusaka, Zambia	Zambia	1–0	3–3	2021 Africa Cup of Nations qualification

== Honours ==
Lyon Reserves

- Championnat de France Amateur: 2010–11, 2011–12

Beşiktaş

- Süper Lig: 2020–21
- Turkish Cup: 2020–21, 2023–24

Individual

- Süper Lig Best Foreign Player: 2020–21
- Süper Lig top assist provider: 2020–21
- Süper Lig Team of the Season: 2020–21
