= Valentin Rosier =

French footballer (born 1996)

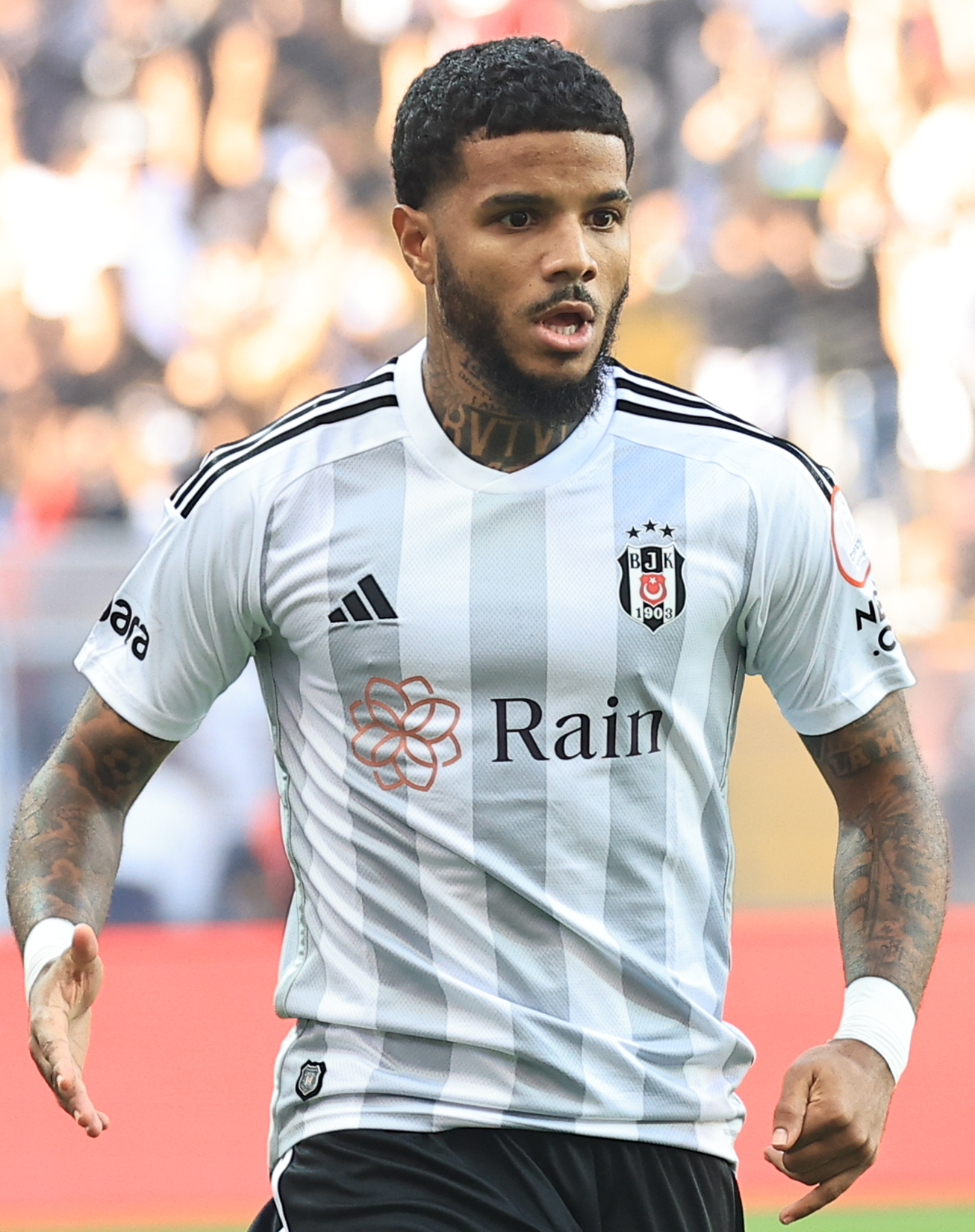
- Rosier with Beşiktaş in 2023

Personal information
- Full name: Valentin André Henri Rosier
- Date of birth: 19 August 1996 (age 30)
- Place of birth: Montauban, France
- Height: 1.75 m (5 ft 9 in)
- Position: Right-back

Team information
- Current team: Osasuna
- Number: 19

Youth career
- 2002–2005: FC Albiassain
- 2005–2009: Montauban FCTG
- 2009–2011: Toulouse
- 2011–2012: FC Terrasses du Tarn
- 2012–2015: Rodez

Senior career*
Years	Team	Apps	(Gls)
2015–2016	Rodez	26	(0)
2016–2017	Dijon B	19	(0)
2016–2019	Dijon	57	(0)
2019–2022	Sporting CP	9	(0)
2020–2022	→ Beşiktaş (loan)	64	(2)
2022–2024	Beşiktaş	39	(1)
2024	→ Nice (loan)	3	(0)
2024–2025	Leganés	32	(1)
2025–	Osasuna	36	(1)

International career
2018	France U21	7	(0)
- * Club domestic league appearances and goals as of 8 November 2026

Valentin André Henri Rosier (born 19 August 1996) is a French professional footballer who plays as a right-back for Spanish club CA Osasuna.

== Club career ==
Born in Montauban, Tarn-et-Garonne, of Guadeloupean, Malagasy and Italian descent, Rosier began his senior career with Rodez AF in the fourth tier in 2015, moving to Dijon FCO of Ligue 1 a year later, on a three-season contract.

Rosier made his professional debut on 31 January 2017, in the last 32 of the Coupe de France, playing the entirety of a 2–1 loss at Bordeaux. Hosting the same opponents on 30 April, he played his first top-flight game in a goalless draw.

On 27 June 2019, Rosier signed a three-year contract at Sporting CP of Portugal's Primeira Liga, for a fee of €7.5 million and the exchange of Mama Baldé to Dijon. He debuted on 15 September in a 1–1 draw away to Boavista FC. His first season was disrupted by foot injuries.

On 2 October 2020, Rosier joined Beşiktaş on loan for the 2020–21 season.

On 11 December 2023, it was officially announced that Rosier has been excluded from the squad along with Vincent Aboubakar, Eric Bailly, Rachid Ghezzal and Jean Onana due to poor performance and incompatibility within the team.

On 16 January 2024, Beşiktaş sent Rosier on loan to Ligue 1 club Nice until the end of the season, with an option to make the move permanent.

On 4 July 2024, Rosier joined newly promoted Spanish club CD Leganés of La Liga on a four-year deal. On 28 May of the following year, after suffering relegation, he agreed to a three-year contract with CA Osasuna on a free transfer.

== International career ==
Rosier earned seven caps for France at under-21 level, all in 2018. On his debut on 23 March, the side won 3–0 away to Kazakhstan in a European qualifier.

== Career statistics ==
As of match played 7 November 2026

Appearances and goals by club, season and competition
Club	Season	League			National cup (Note: Includes Turkish Cup)		League cup (Note: Includes Taça da Liga)		Europe		Other		Total	
Club	Season	Division	Apps	Goals	Apps	Goals	Apps	Goals	Apps	Goals	Apps	Goals	Apps	Goals
Rodez	2015–16	CFA	25	0	—		—		—		—		25	0
Dijon B	2016–17	CFA 2	19	0	—		—		—		—		19	0
Dijon	2016–17	Ligue 1	3	0	1	0	0	0	—		—		4	0
Dijon	2017–18	Ligue 1	36	0	1	0	0	0	—		—		37	0
Dijon	2018–19	Ligue 1	18	0	0	0	1	0	—		0	0	19	0
Dijon	Total		57	0	2	0	1	0	—		0	0	60	0
Sporting CP	2019–20	Primeira Liga	9	0	1	0	1	0	5 (Note: Appearances in UEFA Europa League)	0	0	0	16	0
Beşiktaş (loan)	2020–21	Süper Lig	33	1	4	2	—		—		—		37	3
Beşiktaş (loan)	2021–22	Süper Lig	31	1	2	1	—		5 (Note: Appearances in UEFA Champions League)	0	1 (Note: Appearance in Turkish Super Cup)	0	39	2
Beşiktaş	2022–23	Süper Lig	27	1	2	0	—		—		—		29	1
Beşiktaş	2023–24	Süper Lig	12	0	0	0	—		9 (Note: Appearances in UEFA Europa Conference League)	0	—		21	0
Beşiktaş	Beşiktaş total		103	3	8	3	—		14	0	1	0	126	6
Nice (loan)	2023–24	Ligue 1	3	0	0	0	—		—		—		3	0
Leganés	2024–25	La Liga	32	1	4	0	—		—		—		36	1
Osasuna	2025–26	La Liga	31	1	1	0	—		—		—		32	1
Osasuna	2026–27	La Liga	5	0	0	0	—		—		—		5	0
Osasuna	Total		36	1	1	0	—		—		—		37	1
Career total			284	5	16	3	2	0	19	0	1	0	322	8

== Honours ==
Beşiktaş

- Süper Lig: 2020–21
- Turkish Cup: 2020–21
- Turkish Super Cup: 2021

Individual

- Süper Lig Team of the Season: 2020–21
