= Josef de Souza =

Brazilian footballer

Souza
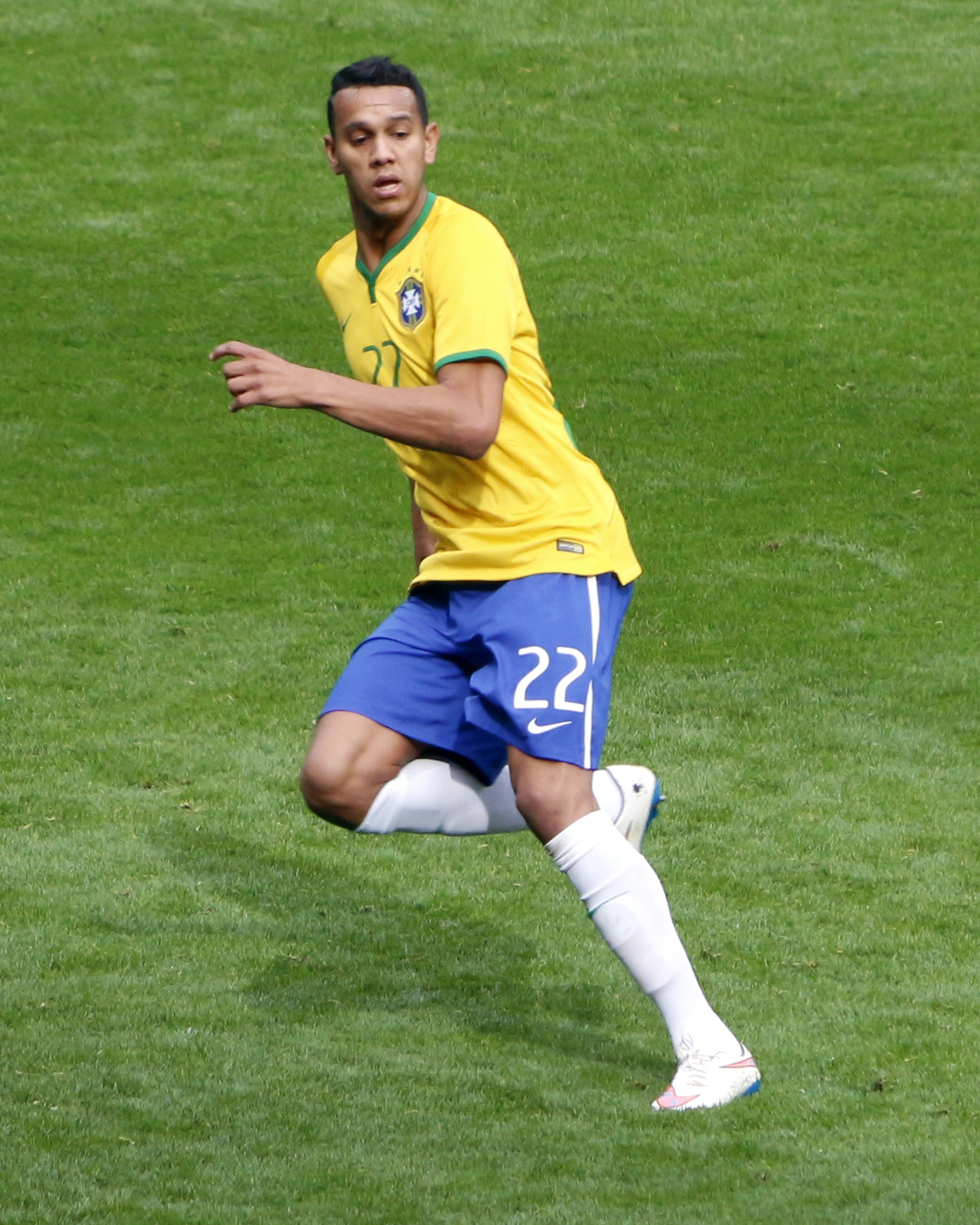
- De Souza with Brazil in 2015

Personal information
- Full name: Josef de Souza Dias
- Date of birth: 11 February 1989 (age 37)
- Place of birth: Rio de Janeiro, Brazil
- Height: 1.88 m (6 ft 2 in)
- Position: Defensive midfielder

Youth career
- 1998–2008: Vasco da Gama

Senior career*
Years	Team	Apps	(Gls)
2008–2010	Vasco da Gama	42	(2)
2010–2012	Porto	20	(0)
2012–2014	Grêmio	87	(3)
2014–2015	São Paulo	55	(6)
2015–2018	Fenerbahçe	96	(10)
2018–2020	Al-Ahli	34	(1)
2020–2023	Beşiktaş	75	(8)
2023	Beijing Guoan	20	(4)
2024	İstanbul Başakşehir	11	(0)
2024–2025	Vasco da Gama	7	(0)

International career
2009	Brazil U20	5	(0)
2014–2015	Brazil	3	(0)
- * Club domestic league appearances and goals as of 1 July 2025

Josef de Souza Dias (born 11 February 1989), known as Souza, is a former Brazilian professional footballer who played as a midfielder.

== Club career ==
On 14 September 2020, Souza joined Beşiktaş.

On 30 March 2023, Souza joined Chinese Super League club Beijing Guoan on a free transfer.

On 1 January 2024, Souza returned to Turkey and signed a with Süper Lig club İstanbul Başakşehir. However, his time at İstanbul Başakşehir lasted only six months, as in July 2024, he was announced by Vasco da Gama, the club where he played in the youth categories.

== International career ==
On 14 October 2014, Souza made his international debut in a 4-0 away win against Japan in an international friendly game.

== Career statistics ==
As of match played 29 January 2025.

Appearances and goals by club, season and competition
Club	Season	League			State League		National Cup		League Cup		Continental		Other		Total	
Club	Season	Division	Apps	Goals	Apps	Goals	Apps	Goals	Apps	Goals	Apps	Goals	Apps	Goals	Apps	Goals
Vasco da Gama	2009	Série B	18	2	1	0	0	0	—		—		—		19	2
Vasco da Gama	2010	Série A	7	0	16	0	4	0	—		—		—		27	0
Vasco da Gama	Total		25	2	17	0	4	0	—		—		—		46	2
Porto	2010–11	Primeira Liga	12	0	—		1	0	2	0	8	1	0	0	23	1
Porto	2011–12	Primeira Liga	8	0	—		0	0	2	0	2	0	2	0	14	0
Porto	Total		20	0	—		1	0	4	0	10	1	2	0	37	1
Grêmio	2012	Série A	33	2	12	1	9	0	—		6	0	—		60	3
Grêmio	2013	Série A	31	0	11	0	6	1	—		10	0	—		58	1
Grêmio	Total		64	2	23	1	15	1	—		16	0	—		118	4
São Paulo	2014	Série A	33	3	7	1	5	0	—		7	0	—		52	4
São Paulo	2015	Série A	8	2	7	0	—		—		8	0	—		23	2
São Paulo	Total		41	5	14	1	5	0	—		15	0	—		75	4
Fenerbahçe	2015–16	Süper Lig	31	1	—		5	1	—		12	2	—		48	4
Fenerbahçe	2016–17	Süper Lig	30	5	—		5	1	—		10	1	—		45	7
Fenerbahçe	2017–18	Süper Lig	33	3	—		5	1	—		3	0	—		41	4
Fenerbahçe	2018–19	Süper Lig	2	1	—		0	0	—		0	0	—		2	1
Fenerbahçe	Total		96	10	—		15	3	—		25	3	—		136	16
Al-Ahli	2018–19	Saudi Professional League	15	1	—		0	0	—		2	0	—		17	1
Al-Ahli	2019–20	Saudi Professional League	19	0	—		2	0	—		1	0	—		22	0
Al-Ahli	Total		34	1	—		2	0	—		3	0	—		39	1
Beşiktaş	2020–21	Süper Lig	33	2	—		5	1	—		—		—		38	3
Beşiktaş	2021–22	Süper Lig	32	5	—		2	0	—		5	0	1	0	40	5
Beşiktaş	2022–23	Süper Lig	10	1	—		0	0	—		—		—		10	1
Beşiktaş	Total		75	8	—		7	1	—		5	0	1	0	88	9
Beijing Guoan	2023	Chinese Super League	20	4	—		0	0	—		—		—		20	4
İstanbul Başakşehir	2023–24	Süper Lig	11	0	—		2	0	—		—		—		13	0
Vasco da Gama	2024	Série A	4	0	—		1	0	—		—		—		5	0
Vasco da Gama	2025	Série A	0	0	3	0	0	0	—		0	0	—		3	0
Vasco da Gama	Total		4	0	3	0	1	0	—		0	0	—		8	0
Career total			390	32	57	2	52	5	4	0	74	4	3	0	580	43

== Honours ==
Vasco da Gama

- Campeonato Brasileiro Série B: 2009

Porto

- UEFA Europa League: 2010–11
- Primeira Liga: 2010–11, 2011–12
- Taça de Portugal: 2010–11
- Supertaça Cândido de Oliveira: 2010, 2011

Beşiktaş

- Süper Lig: 2020–21
- Turkish Cup: 2020–21
- Süper Kupa: 2021

Brazil

- Superclásico de las Américas: 2014

Individual

- Campeonato Brasileiro Série A Team of the Year: 2014
- Süper Lig Midfielder of the Season: 2020–21
