= Kerem Kalafat =

Turkish footballer

Personal information
- Date of birth: 9 March 2001 (age 25)
- Place of birth: Şişli, Turkey
- Height: 1.76 m (5 ft 9 in)
- Position: Right back

Team information
- Current team: Pendikspor
- Number: 22

Youth career
- 2013–2019: Beşiktaş

Senior career*
Years	Team	Apps	(Gls)
2019–2023	Beşiktaş	2	(0)
2020–2021	→ Giresunspor (loan)	28	(0)
2021–2022	→ Uşakspor (loan)	16	(0)
2022–2023	→ Çaykur Rizespor (loan)	10	(0)
2023–2026	Çorum	71	(1)
2026–	Pendikspor	8	(0)

International career^{‡}
2016–2017	Turkey U16	3	(0)
2017	Turkey U17	1	(0)
2018–2019	Turkey U18	10	(0)
2019–2020	Turkey U19	12	(0)
- * Club domestic league appearances and goals as of 13 October 2026 ‡ National team caps and goals as of 18 January 2022

Kerem Kalafat (born 9 March 2001) is a Turkish professional footballer who plays as a right back for TFF 1. Lig club Pendikspor.

== Career ==
Kalafat made his professional debut with Beşiktaş in a 4–0 UEFA Europa League loss to Wolverhampton Wanderers on 12 December 2019. In July 2021, Beşiktaş loanded Kalafat out TFF Second League outfit Uşakspor for 2021–22 season. On 13 January 2022, Beşiktaş used the call-back option of Kalafat while his loan stint at Uşakspor and he rejoined the team. He was then loaned to Çaykur Rizespor for the following season.
