= Güven Yalçın =

Turkish footballer (born 1999)

Personal information
- Date of birth: 18 January 1999 (age 27)
- Place of birth: Düsseldorf, Germany
- Height: 1.84 m (6 ft 0 in)
- Position: Forward

Team information
- Current team: Kasımpaşa
- Number: 50

Youth career
- 2006–2018: Bayer Leverkusen

Senior career*
Years	Team	Apps	(Gls)
2018–2022	Beşiktaş	85	(18)
2021	→ Lecce (loan)	10	(0)
2022–2025	Genoa	22	(0)
2023–2024	→ Fatih Karagümrük (loan)	32	(9)
2024–2025	→ Arouca (loan)	23	(4)
2025–2026	Alanyaspor	28	(8)
2026–	Kasımpaşa	7	(2)

International career^{‡}
2015–2016	Turkey U17	11	(3)
2017	Germany U18	1	(0)
2017–2018	Turkey U19	11	(4)
2018	Turkey U21	4	(0)
2019	Turkey	3	(0)
- * Club domestic league appearances and goals as of 9 October 2026 ‡ National team caps and goals as of 8 September 2019

Güven Yalçın (born 18 January 1999) is a professional footballer who plays as a forward for Süper Lig club Kasımpaşa. Born in Germany, he played for the Turkey national team.

== Club career ==
Yalçın spent his entire youth development with Bayer Leverkusen, joining them in 2006. On 27 July 2018, Yalçın signed with Beşiktaş in Turkish Süper Lig. Yalçın made his professional debut for Beşiktaş in a 1-1 2018–19 UEFA Europa League qualifier against FK Partizan on 23 August 2018.

On 1 February 2021 he was signed by Italian side Lecce on loan with an option to buy.

On 21 July 2022, Yalçın returned to Italy and signed with Genoa.

On 8 September 2023, Yalçın was loaned to Süper Lig club Fatih Karagümrük until the end of the season.

On 16 July 2025, Yalçın signed a three-season contract with Alanyaspor.

== International career ==
Yalçın was born in Germany and is of Turkish descent. He first represented the Turkey U17, and then represented the Germany U18s in a 3-0 friendly win over the Austria U18s on 17 April 2017. He then switched back to represent the Turkey U19s, with whom he participated in the 2018 UEFA European Under-19 Championship.

He made his Turkey national football team debut on 30 May 2019, in a friendly against Greece, as a 55th-minute substitute for Cenk Tosun.

== Honours ==
Beşiktaş

- Turkish Super Cup: 2021
