= Efe Tatlı =

Turkish footballer

Personal information
- Date of birth: 29 July 2002 (age 24)
- Place of birth: Gaziosmanpaşa, Turkey
- Height: 1.80 m (5 ft 11 in)
- Position: Midfielder

Team information
- Current team: Elazığspor
- Number: 44

Youth career
- 2014–2015: Arnavutköy Belediyesi
- 2015–2016: Arnavutköy Yayla
- 2016: Bollucaspor
- 2016–2018: İstanbul Gençlerbirliği
- 2018: Galatasaray
- 2018–2019: Fatih Karagümrük

Senior career*
Years	Team	Apps	(Gls)
2019–2024	Fatih Karagümrük	14	(0)
2022	→ Adanaspor (loan)	9	(0)
2023–2024	→ Karşıyaka (loan)	1	(0)
2024–	Elazığspor	13	(1)
2026	→ Artvin Hopaspor (loan)	5	(0)
- * Club domestic league appearances and goals as of 1 October 2026

Efe Tatlı (born 29 July 2002) is a Turkish professional footballer who plays as a midfielder for TFF 2. Lig club Elazığspor.

== Professional career ==
Tatlı began his youth career with various academies in Turkey, with a brieft stint with Galatasaray in 2018, before moving to Fatih Karagümrük's academy. Tatlı signed his first professional contract with Fatih Karagümrük in 2019. He debuted with Fatih Karagümrük in a 3–1 TFF First League win over Bursaspor on 17 August 2019. His club was promoted to the Süper Lig, and Tatlı made his professional debut in a 1–1 Süper Lig tie with Galatasaray on 10 April 2021.
