= Emre Bilgin =

Turkish footballer

Personal information
- Date of birth: 26 February 2004 (age 22)
- Place of birth: Güngören, Turkey
- Height: 1.88 m (6 ft 2 in)
- Position: Goalkeeper

Team information
- Current team: Eyüpspor
- Number: 1

Youth career
- 2013–2014: Bayrampaşa Demirspor
- 2014–2020: Beşiktaş

Senior career*
Years	Team	Apps	(Gls)
2020–2026	Beşiktaş	5	(0)
2023–2024	→ Fatih Karagümrük (loan)	10	(0)
2024–2025	→ Fatih Karagümrük (loan)	21	(0)
2026–	Eyüpspor	5	(0)

International career^{‡}
2018–2019	Turkey U15	2	(0)
2019–2020	Turkey U16	9	(0)
2021–2022	Turkey U18	2	(0)
2021–2022	Turkey U19	2	(0)
2022–2025	Turkey U21	11	(0)
- * Club domestic league appearances and goals as of 22 November 2026 ‡ National team caps and goals as of 25 March 2025

Emre Bilgin (born 26 February 2004) is a Turkish professional footballer who plays as a goalkeeper for Süper Lig club Eyüpspor.

== Club career ==
A youth product of Bayrampaşa Demirspor, Bilgin joined the youth academy of Beşiktaş in 2014. On 7 August 2020, he signed his first professional contract with Beşiktaş, keeping him at the club at least until 2023. He debuted with Beşiktaş in a 1–1 Süper Lig tie with Hatayspor on 19 March 2022.

On 6 July 2023, Bilgin was loaned to Süper Lig club Fatih Karagümrük until the end of the season

On 22 July 2024, Bilgin was loaned to Fatih Karagümrük once again until the end of the season

On 15 August 2026, Bilgin transferred to Eyüpspor permanently.

== International career ==
Bilgin is a youth international for Turkey, having represented the Turkey U15s, U16s, and U19s.

== Career statistics ==
As of match played 22 November 2026

Appearances and goals by club, season and competition
Club	Season	League			National cup (Note: Includes Cupa României, Copa del Rey)		Europe		Other		Total	
Club	Season	Division	Apps	Goals	Apps	Goals	Apps	Goals	Apps	Goals	Apps	Goals
Beşiktaş	2020–21	Süper Lig	0	0	0	0	0	0	—		0	0
Beşiktaş	2021–22	Süper Lig	3	0	0	0	0	0	0	0	3	0
Beşiktaş	2022–23	Süper Lig	2	0	0	0	—		—		2	0
Beşiktaş	2025–26	Süper Lig	0	0	0	0	0	0	—		0	0
Beşiktaş	Total		5	0	0	0	0	0	0	0	5	0
Fatih Karagümrük (loan)	2023–24	Süper Lig	10	0	3	0	—		—		13	0
Fatih Karagümrük (loan)	2024–25	TFF 1. Lig	21	0	3	0	—		0	0	24	0
Eyüpspor	2026–27	Süper Lig	5	0	0	0	—		—		5	0
Career total			41	0	6	0	0	0	0	0	47	0

== Honours ==
Beşiktaş

- Süper Lig: 2020–21
- Turkish Cup: 2020–21
- Turkish Super Cup: 2021
