= 2021 Turkish Super Cup =

- Event: Turkish Super Cup
Beşiktaş	Antalyaspor
1	1
- After extra time Beşiktaş won 4–2 on penalties
- Date: 5 January 2022
- Venue: Ahmad bin Ali Stadium, Al Rayyan, Qatar
- Man of the Match: Atiba Hutchinson (Beşiktaş)
- Referee: Halil Umut Meler
- Attendance: 3,500
- Weather: Clear

The 2021 Turkish Super Cup (Turkish: TFF Süper Kupa 2021), officially known as the 2021 Turkcell Super Cup (Turkish: Turkcell Süper Kupa 2021) for sponsorship reasons, was the 48th edition of the Turkish Super Cup since its establishment as Presidential Cup in 1966, the annual Turkish football match contested by the winners of the previous season's top league and cup competitions (or cup runner-up in case the league- and cup-winning club is the same). The game was played on 5 January 2022 between Beşiktaş and Antalyaspor. The venue was the Ahmad bin Ali Stadium in Al Rayyan, Qatar. Beşiktaş won the match 4–2 on penalties.

== Teams ==
Team	Qualification	Previous participations (bold indicates winners)
Beşiktaş	Winners of the 2020–21 Süper Lig and 2020–21 Turkish Cup	20 (**1966**, 1967, **1974**, 1975, 1977, 1982, **1986**, **1989**, 1990, 1991, **1992**, 1993, **1994**, 1995, **1998**, **2006**, 2007, 2009, 2016, 2017)
Antalyaspor	Runner-up of the 2020–21 Turkish Cup	None

== Venue ==
City	Stadium	Location of the host city of the 2021 Turkish Super Cup.
Al Rayyan (Doha Area)	Ahmad bin Ali Stadium	Location of the host city of the 2021 Turkish Super Cup.
**Capacity: 45,032**		Location of the host city of the 2021 Turkish Super Cup.

== Match ==
=== Details ===
5 January 2022
20:45 AST

Beşiktaş	1–1 (a.e.t.)	Antalyaspor
Hutchinson 33'	Report	Hutchinson 74' (o.g.)
Penalties
Teixeira (penalty scored); Batshuayi (penalty scored); Hutchinson (penalty scored); Vida (penalty scored)	4–2	(penalty scored) Vural; (penalty missed) Erdilman; (penalty scored) Özmert; (penalty missed) Floranus

Ahmad bin Ali Stadium, Al Rayyan (Qatar)
Attendance: 3,500
Referee: Halil Umut Meler

**Beşiktaş**	**Antalyaspor**

GK	30	(Turkey) Ersin Destanoğlu
RB	2	(France) Valentin Rosier
CB	24	(Croatia) Domagoj Vida
CB	4	(Spain) Javi Montero
LB	3	(Turkey) Rıdvan Yılmaz		(substituted off) 103'
CM	5	(Brazil) Josef de Souza
CM	13	(Canada) Atiba Hutchinson (c)
CM	15	(Bosnia and Herzegovina) Miralem Pjanić	(yellow card) 55'	(substituted off) 68'
LW	28	(Turkey) Kenan Karaman		(substituted off) 80'
RW	17	(Canada) Cyle Larin		(substituted off) 79'
CF	19	(Belgium) Michy Batshuayi
Substitutes:
GK	61	(Turkey) Emre Bilgin
GK	74	(Turkey) Göktuğ Baytekin
DF	23	(Brazil) Welinton	(yellow card) 113'	(substituted on) 103'
DF	77	(Turkey) Umut Meraş		(substituted on) 68'
MF	65	(Turkey) Emirhan İlkhan		(substituted on) 80'
MF	68	(Turkey) Demir Ege Tıknaz
MF	72	(Turkey) Emirhan Delibaş
MF	90	(Brazil) Alex Teixeira		(substituted on) 79'
Manager:
(Turkey) Önder Karaveli

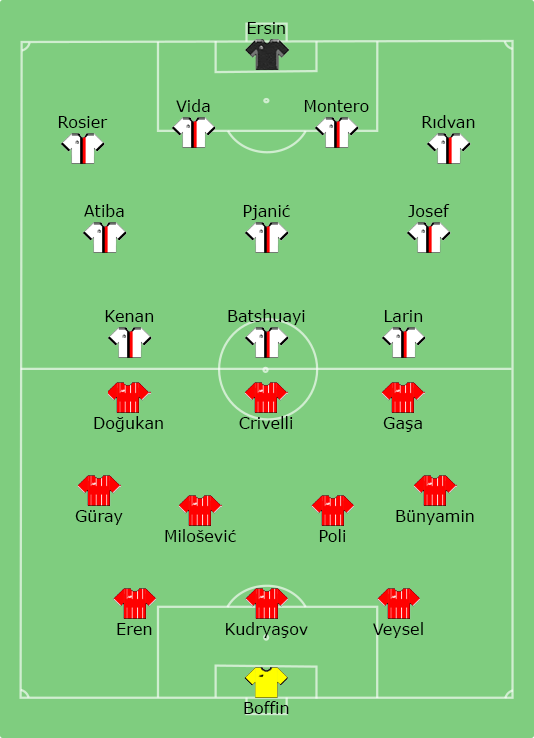

GK	25	(Belgium) Ruud Boffin	(yellow card) 60'
CB	89	(Turkey) Veysel Sarı (c)	(yellow card) 4'
CB	13	(Russia) Fyodor Kudryashov
CB	6	(Turkey) Eren Albayrak		(substituted off) 46'
CM	15	(Italy) Andrea Poli		(substituted off) 95'
CM	10	(Bosnia and Herzegovina) Deni Milošević		(substituted off) 64'
RM	77	(Turkey) Bünyamin Balcı
LM	11	(Turkey) Güray Vural
RW	27	(Algeria) Houssam Ghacha		(substituted off) 64'
LW	7	(Turkey) Doğukan Sinik		(substituted off) 98'
CF	17	(France) Enzo Crivelli		(substituted off) 75'
Substitutes:
GK	1	(Turkey) Doğukan Özkan
GK	99	(Portugal) Diogo Sousa
DF	2	(Netherlands) Sherel Floranus		(substituted on) 95'
MF	8	(Turkey) Nuri Şahin
MF	23	(Brazil) Amilton		(substituted on) 64'
MF	38	(Turkey) Mustafa Erdilman		(substituted on) 98'
MF	88	(Turkey) Hakan Özmert		(substituted on) 64'
FW	12	(Nigeria) Paul Mukairu		(substituted on) 46'
FW	41	(Turkey) Gökdeniz Bayrakdar		(substituted on) 75'
Manager:
(Turkey) Nuri Şahin

Man of the Match:
Atiba Hutchinson (Beşiktaş)

Assistant referees:
Süleyman Özay
Candaş Elbil
Fourth official:
Atilla Karaoğlan
Video assistant referee:
Erkan Özdamar
Assistant video assistant referees:
Özgüç Türkalp
Erdinç Sezertam

**Match rules**

- 90 minutes
- 30 minutes of extra time if necessary
- Penalty shoot-out if scores still level
- Nine named substitutes
- Maximum of five substitutions, with a sixth allowed in extra time (Note: Each team was given only three opportunities to make substitutions, with a fourth opportunity in extra time, excluding substitutions made at half-time, before the start of extra time and at half-time in extra time.)
