= 2023–24 Beşiktaş J.K. season =

Beşiktaş J.K.
2023–24 season
- President: Ahmet Nur Çebi
- Head coach: Şenol Güneş (until 6 October 2023); Rıza Çalımbay (from 10 November until 22 December); Serdar Topraktepe (interim, from 22 December 2023 until 7 January 2024); Fernando Santos (from 7 January until 13 April); Serdar Topraktepe (interim, from 13 April)
- Stadium: Beşiktaş Stadium
- Süper Lig: 6th
- Turkish Cup: Winners
- UEFA Europa Conference League: Group stage
- Top goalscorer: League: Semih Kılıçsoy (10); All: Vincent Aboubakar (12)
- Highest home attendance: 27,130 vs Pendikspor
- Lowest home attendance: 21,890 vs Neftchi Baku
- Average home league attendance: 24,242
Home colours	Away colours	Third colours

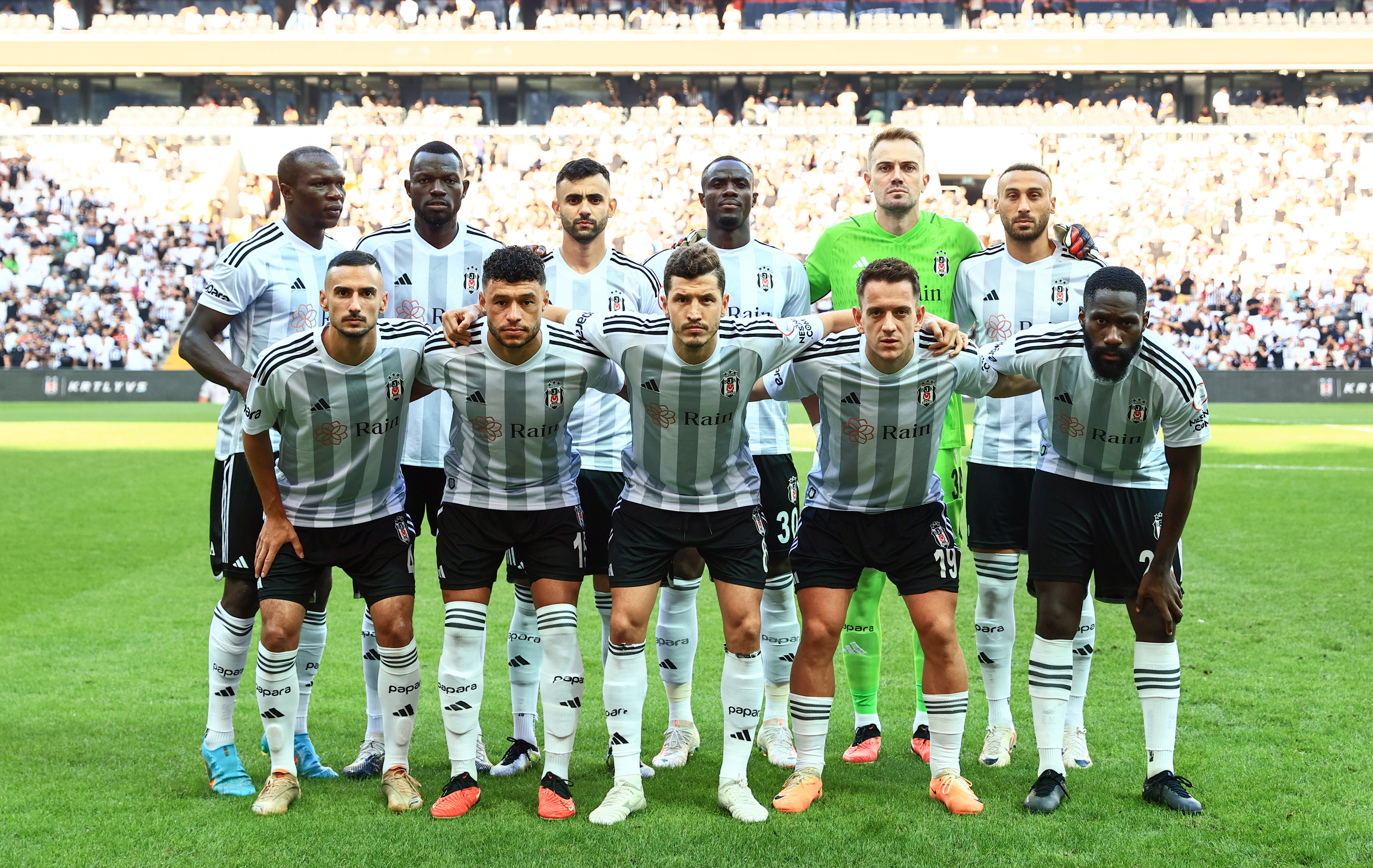
24 September 2023 Beşiktaş - Kayserispor match squad

The 2023–24 season was Beşiktaş J.K.'s 121st season in existence and 66th consecutive in the Süper Lig. They also competed in the Turkish Cup and the UEFA Europa Conference League.

Beşiktaş concluded a tumultuous season in the domestic league, finishing in sixth place following a period marked by managerial instability, with four different head coaches assuming the role throughout the campaign. Despite these challenges, the club achieved success by securing the Turkish Cup, thereby earning qualification for the UEFA Europa League.

== Players ==
=== First-team squad ===
As of 19 February 2024

Note: Flags indicate national team as defined under FIFA eligibility rules; some limited exceptions apply. Players may hold more than one non-FIFA nationality.

No.	Pos.	Nation	Player
1	GK	TUR	Ersin Destanoğlu
2	DF	NOR	Jonas Svensson
4	DF	TUR	Onur Bulut
5	DF	TUR	Tayyip Talha Sanuç
6	DF	GAM	Omar Colley
7	FW	CRO	Ante Rebić
8	MF	TUR	Salih Uçan
9	FW	TUR	Cenk Tosun
10	FW	CMR	Vincent Aboubakar
11	FW	KOS	Milot Rashica
12	DF	GHA	Daniel Amartey
14	DF	TUR	Emrecan Uzunhan
15	MF	ENG	Alex Oxlade-Chamberlain
17	DF	ENG	Joe Worrall (on loan from Nottingham Forest)
18	FW	ALG	Rachid Ghezzal
19	MF	BIH	Amir Hadžiahmetović
20	MF	TUR	Necip Uysal (captain)
21	MF	TUR	Demir Ege Tıknaz

No.	Pos.	Nation	Player
22	MF	KAZ	Bakhtiyar Zaynutdinov
23	MF	ALB	Ernest Muçi
26	DF	COD	Arthur Masuaku
28	MF	LBA	Al-Musrati
34	GK	TUR	Mert Günok
40	FW	COD	Jackson Muleka
64	FW	TUR	Mustafa Erhan Hekimoğlu
65	MF	TUR	Yakup Arda Kılıç
75	DF	TUR	Tayfur Bingöl
77	DF	TUR	Umut Meraş
79	DF	TUR	Emrecan Terzi
83	MF	POR	Gedson Fernandes
88	MF	SUI	Gökhan Inler
90	FW	TUR	Semih Kılıçsoy
94	GK	TUR	Göktuğ Baytekin
97	GK	TUR	Utku Yuvakuran
—	MF	TUR	Berkay Vardar

=== Out on loan ===
Note: Flags indicate national team as defined under FIFA eligibility rules; some limited exceptions apply. Players may hold more than one non-FIFA nationality.

No.	Pos.	Nation	Player
—	GK	TUR	Emre Bilgin (at Fatih Karagümrük until 30 June 2024)
—	DF	TUR	Bilal Ceylan (at Karşıyaka until 30 June 2024)
—	DF	CIV	Badra Cissé (at CSU Alba Iulia until 30 June 2024)
—	DF	TUR	Ahmet Gülay (at Alanya Kestelspor until 30 June 2024)
—	DF	TUR	Erdoğan Kaya (at Beyoğlu Yeni Çarşı until 30 June 2024)
—	DF	ESP	Javi Montero (at Arouca until 30 June 2024)
—	DF	TUR	Burak Selver Yıldız (at 52 Orduspor until 30 June 2024)
—	MF	TUR	Oğuzhan Akgün (at Sarıyer until 30 June 2024)
—	MF	TUR	Abdullah Aydın (at Esenler Erokspor until 30 June 2024)

No.	Pos.	Nation	Player
—	MF	TUR	Necati Bilgiç (at Adana 1954 FK until 30 June 2024)
—	MF	TUR	Halil Çiçek (at Silivrispor until 30 June 2024)
—	MF	BIH	Ajdin Hasić (at Sarajevo until 30 June 2024)
—	MF	TUR	Kartal Yılmaz (at Kayserispor until 30 June 2024)
—	MF	CMR	Jean Onana (at Marseille until 30 June 2024)
—	DF	FRA	Valentin Rosier (at Nice until 30 June 2024)
—	MF	TUR	Kerem Atakan Kesgin (at Sivasspor until 30 June 2024)
—	FW	TUR	Emrecan Bulut (at Ümraniyespor until 30 June 2024)

== Transfers ==
=== In ===
Pos.	Player	Transferred from	Fee	Date	Source
MF	(Cameroon) Jean Onana	(France) Lens	€4,000,000	21 July 2023	
DF	(Ghana) Daniel Amartey	Unattached	Free	21 July 2023	
FW	(Croatia) Ante Rebić	(Italy) Milan	€500,000	31 July 2023	
MF	(England) Alex Oxlade-Chamberlain	Unattached	Free	14 August 2023	
MF	(Kosovo) Milot Rashica	(England) Norwich City	Undisclosed	16 August 2023	
DF	(Kazakhstan) Bakhtiyar Zaynutdinov	(Russia) CSKA Moscow	€4,500,000	18 August 2023	
DF	(Norway) Jonas Svensson	Unattached	Free	10 January 2024	
DF	(England) Joe Worrall	(England) Nottingham Forest	Loan	5 February 2024	
MF	(Libya) Al-Musrati	(Portugal) Braga	Loan	9 February 2024	
FW	(Albania) Ernest Muçi	(Poland) Legia Warsaw	Undisclosed	9 February 2024	

=== Out ===
Pos.	Player	Transferred to	Fee	Date	Source
MF	(Canada) Atiba Hutchinson	Retired		1 July 2023	
DF	(Morocco) Romain Saïss	(Qatar) Al-Sadd	€2,500,000	24 July 2023	
DF	(Spain) Javi Montero	(Portugal) Arouca	Loan	28 August 2023	
MF	(Cameroon) Jean Onana	(France) Marseille	Loan	8 January 2024	
DF	(France) Valentin Rosier	(France) Nice	Loan	18 January 2024	
MF	(Turkey) Kerem Atakan Kesgin	(Turkey) Sivasspor	Loan	20 January 2024	

== Pre-season and friendlies ==
Win Draw Loss Fixtures

11 July 2023 Friendly	Beşiktaş	1–1	FC Augsburg	Kufstein, Austria
15:00 UTC+2	Muleka 42'		Cardona 59'	Stadium: Kufstein-Arena; Referee: Alan Kijas (Austria)
Note: The match was ended at the 77th minute because Beşiktaş fans threw objects onto the field.

18 July 2023 Friendly	Beşiktaş	4–0	Mezőkövesd-Zsóry	Grödig, Austria
18:00 UTC+2	Aboubakar 16'; Muleka 20', 27'; Kılıçsoy 62'			Stadium: Greisbergers Betten-Arena

21 July 2023 Friendly	Beşiktaş	2–1	RC Strasbourg	Grödig, Austria
16:00 UTC+2	Aboubakar 10', 21'		Sahi 25'	Stadium: MGG Arena

22 November 2023 Friendly	Beşiktaş	Cancelled	İstanbulspor
--:-- UTC+3

6 April 2024 Friendly	Beşiktaş	2–1	İstanbulspor
--:-- UTC+3

== Competitions ==
=== Overall record ===
Competition	First match	Last match	Starting round	Final position	Record							
Competition	First match	Last match	Starting round	Final position	Pld	W	D	L	GF	GA	GD	Win %
Süper Lig	14 August 2023	26 May 2024	Matchday 1	6th	38	16	8	14	52	47	+5	42.11
Turkish Cup	16 January 2024	23 May 2024	Fifth round	Winners	6	5	1	0	12	3	+9	83.33
UEFA Europa Conference League	27 July 2023	14 December 2023	Second qualifying round	Group stage	12	7	1	4	21	19	+2	58.33
Total					56	28	10	18	85	69	+16	50.00

Source: Soccerway

=== Süper Lig ===
==== League table ====
Pos	Team	Pld	W	D	L	GF	GA	GD	Pts	Qualification or relegation
4	Başakşehir	38	18	7	13	57	43	+14	61	Qualification for the Conference League second qualifying round
5	Kasımpaşa	38	16	8	14	62	65	−3	56 (Note: Kasımpaşa are ahead of Beşiktaş on head-to-head points: Kasımpaşa 2–1 Beşiktaş, Beşiktaş 1–3 Kasımpaşa.)	
6	Beşiktaş	38	16	8	14	52	47	+5	56	Qualification for the Europa League play-off round (Note: The 2023–24 Turkish Cup winners (Beşiktaş) qualify for the Europa League play-off round.)
7	Sivasspor	38	14	12	12	47	54	−7	54	
8	Alanyaspor	38	12	16	10	53	50	+3	52	

Source: Süper Lig
Rules for classification: 1) Points; 2) Head-to-head points; 3) Head-to-head goal difference; 4) Head-to-head goals scored; 5) Goal difference; 6) Goals scored; 7) Play-off.

==== Results summary ====
Overall								Home						Away					
Pld	W	D	L	GF	GA	GD	Pts	W	D	L	GF	GA	GD	W	D	L	GF	GA	GD
38	16	8	14	52	47	+5	56	10	4	5	29	19	+10	6	4	9	23	28	−5

Source: Trendyol Süper Lig

==== Results by round ====
Round	1	2	3	4	5	6	7	8	9	10	11	12	13	14	15	16	17	18	19	20	21	22	23	24	25	26	27
Ground	A	H	A	H	A	H	A	H	A	H	A	H	A	A	H	A	H	A	H	H	A	H	A	H	A	H	A
Result	W	D	L	W	L	W	W	W	L	W	L	W	W	D	L	W	L	W	L	W	L	D	L	W	D	W	
Position	6	8	12	5	10	6	4	4	4	4	5	5	3	3	5	4	4	4	4	4	4	4	4	3	4	4	

Updated to match(es) played on 18 February 2024. Source: Trendyol Süper Lig
A = Away; H = Home; W = Win; D = Draw; L = Loss

==== Matches ====
The league fixtures were unveiled on 19 July 2023.

14 August 2023 1	Fatih Karagümrük	0–1	Beşiktaş	Istanbul
21:00 TRT (UTC+3)	Mercan (yellow card) 24'; Veseli (yellow card) 54'; Drešević (yellow card) 69'; Dursun (yellow card) 90+1'	Report	Uysal (yellow card) 35'; Aboubakar (penalty missed) 48'; Fernandes 85'	Stadium: Atatürk Olympic Stadium; Attendance: 1,134; Referee: Erkan Özdamar

20 August 2023 2	Beşiktaş	1–1	Pendikspor	Beşiktaş
21:45 TRT (UTC+3)	Colley 12'; Rashica (yellow card) 81'; Günok (yellow card) 90+8'; Bulut (yellow card) 90+9'; Rebić (yellow card) 90+12'	Report	Asan (yellow card) 11'; Öğür (yellow card) 90+1'; Özgenç (yellow card) 90+1'; Romero 90+4' (pen.); Vuković (yellow card) 90+9'	Stadium: Tüpraş Stadyumu; Attendance: 27,130; Referee: Kadir Sağlam

3 September 2023 4	Beşiktaş	2–0	Sivasspor	Beşiktaş
19:15 TRT (UTC+3)	Colley 25'; Rashica 40'	Report		Stadium: Tüpraş Stadyumu; Referee: Zorbay Küçük

17 September 2023 5	Trabzonspor	3–0	Beşiktaş	Trabzon
20:00 TRT (UTC+3)		Report		Stadium: Şenol Güneş Sports Complex; Referee: Volkan Bayarslan

24 September 2023 6	Beşiktaş	2–1	Kayserispor	Istanbul
17:00				Stadium: Tüpraş Stadyumu; Referee: Ali Şansalan

27 September 2023 3	Adana Demirspor	4–2	Beşiktaş	Adana
20:00 TRT (UTC+3)	Belhanda 8'; Niang 17'; Akbaba (yellow card) 55', (goal) 59'; Erdoğan 75', (yellow card) 76'	Report	Aboubakar 79'; Rashica 89'; Uysal (yellow card) 90+7'	Stadium: New Adana Stadium; Referee: Ümit Öztürk
Note: The match scheduled for 28 August 2023 was postponed due to the UEFA Conference League play-offs.

1 October 2023 7	Konyaspor	0–2	Beşiktaş	Konya
19:00				Stadium: Konya Metropolitan Municipality Stadium; Referee: Arda Kardeşler

8 October 2023 8	Beşiktaş	2–0	İstanbulspor	Istanbul
16:00				Stadium: Tüpraş Stadyumu; Referee: Tugay Kaan Numanoğlu

21 October 2023 9	Galatasaray	2–1	Beşiktaş	Sarıyer, Istanbul
19:00 TRT (UTC+3)	Sánchez (yellow card) 17'; Icardi 26', 82' (pen.); Bakambu (yellow card) 84'; Muslera (yellow card) 90+2'		Amartey (yellow card) 17'; Bingöl (yellow card) 18'; Günok (red card) 30'; Hadžiahmetović (yellow card) 57'; Oxlade-Chamberlain 69'; Masuaku (yellow card) 76'; Rebić (yellow card) 89'; Ghezzal (yellow card) End of the match'	Stadium: Rams Park; Attendance: 50,429; Referee: Halil Umut Meler

30 October 2023 10	Beşiktaş	2–0	Gaziantep	Istanbul
20:00				Stadium: Tüpraş Stadyumu; Referee: Mete Kalkavan

5 November 2023 11	Antalyaspor	3–2	Beşiktaş	Antalya
19:00				Stadium: Corendon Airlines Park; Referee: Yaşar Kemal Uğurlu

12 November 2023 12	Beşiktaş	1–0	İstanbul Başakşehir	Istanbul
16:00 UTC+3	Muleka 55'	Report		Stadium: Tüpraş Stadyumu

26 November 2023 13	Samsunspor	1–2	Beşiktaş	Samsun
16:00				Stadium: Samsun 19 Mayıs Stadium; Referee: Abdulkadir Bitigen

3 December 2023 14	Ankaragücü	1–1	Beşiktaş	Ankara
19:00				Stadium: Eryaman Stadium; Referee: Zorbay Küçük

9 December 2023 15	Beşiktaş	1–3	Fenerbahçe	Istanbul
19:00 TRT (UTC+3)	Rebić (yellow card) 23'; Oxlade-Chamberlain 24' (pen.); Uçan (yellow card) 52'; Günok (yellow card) 75'; Bingöl (yellow card) 78'; Uysal (yellow card) 90+7'	Report	Džeko 10', (yellow card) 21'; Akaydin (yellow card) 21'; Fred (yellow card) 23'; Tadić 63' (pen.), (penalty missed) 90+2'; Kahveci (yellow card) 82'; Szymański 90+6'	Stadium: Tüpraş Stadyumu; Referee: Atilla Karaoğlan

21 December 2023 17	Beşiktaş	1–3	Alanyaspor	Istanbul
	Colley 9'		Özdemir 38'; Janvier 82'; Carlos Eduardo 90'	Stadium: Tüpraş Stadyumu

25 December 2023 18	Hatayspor	1–2	Beşiktaş	Mersin
20:00				Stadium: Mersin Stadium; Referee: Kadir Sağlam

5 January 2024 19	Beşiktaş	1–3	Kasımpaşa	Istanbul
20:00				Stadium: Tüpraş Stadyumu; Referee: Arda Kardeşler

9 January 2024 16	Çaykur Rizespor	0–3	Beşiktaş	Rize
20:00			Destanoğlu 58', 82', 89'	Stadium: Rize City Stadium; Referee: Abdulkadir Bitigen

13 January 2024 20	Beşiktaş	3–0	Fatih Karagümrük	Istanbul
19:00				Stadium: Tüpraş Stadyumu; Referee: Mert Güzenge

20 January 2024 21	Pendikspor	4–0	Beşiktaş	Istanbul
18:55				Stadium: Pendik Stadium; Referee: Tugay Kaan Numanoğlu

23 January 2024 22	Beşiktaş	0–0	Adana Demirspor	Istanbul
20:00				Stadium: Tüpraş Stadyumu

28 January 2024 23	Sivasspor	1–0	Beşiktaş	Sivas
16:00				Stadium: New Sivas 4 Eylül Stadium

4 February 2024 24	Beşiktaş	2–0	Trabzonspor	Istanbul
19:00 TRT (UTC+3)	Meraş (yellow card) 38'; Kılıçsoy 44', 62'; Svensson (yellow card) 54'; Ghezzal (yellow card) 58'			Stadium: Tüpraş Stadyumu; Referee: Arda Kardeşler

12 February 2024 25	Kayserispor	0–0	Beşiktaş	Kayseri
20:00 TRT (UTC+3)	Bourabia (yellow card) 41'; Sazdağı (yellow card) 62'; Kocaman (yellow card) 89'			Stadium: Kadir Has Stadium; Attendance: 9,190; Referee: Kadir Sağlam

19 February 2024 26	Beşiktaş	2–0	Konyaspor	Istanbul
20:00 TRT (UTC+3)	Kılıçsoy (yellow card) 24', (goal) 49'; Muçi (yellow card) 40'; Tosun 71'			Stadium: Tüpraş Stadyumu; Attendance: 21,962; Referee: Tugay Kaan Numanoğlu

25 February 2024 27	İstanbulspor	0–2	Beşiktaş	Istanbul
19:00 TRT (UTC+3)			Colley 45+1'; Uysal 57'; Bulut (yellow card) 72'	Stadium: Esenyurt Necmi Kadıoğlu Stadium; Attendance: 23,891

3 March 2024 28	Beşiktaş	0–1	Galatasaray	Istanbul
19:00				Stadium: Tüpraş Stadyumu

11 March 2024 29	Gaziantep	2–0	Beşiktaş	Gaziantep
20:30				Stadium: Gaziantep Stadium

16 March 2024 30	Beşiktaş	1–2	Antalyaspor	Istanbul
20:30				Stadium: Tüpraş Stadyumu

4 April 2024 31	İstanbul Başakşehir	1–1	Beşiktaş	Istanbul
20:30				Stadium: Başakşehir Fatih Terim Stadium

13 April 2024 32	Beşiktaş	1–1	Samsunspor	Istanbul
19:00				Stadium: Tüpraş Stadyumu

19 April 2024 33	Beşiktaş	2–0	Ankaragücü	Istanbul
20:00				Stadium: Tüpraş Stadyumu

27 April 2024 34	Fenerbahçe	2–1	Beşiktaş	Istanbul
19:00				Stadium: Şükrü Saracoğlu Stadium

3 May 2024 35	Beşiktaş	3–2	Çaykur Rizespor	Istanbul
20:00				Stadium: Tüpraş Stadyumu

12 May 2024 36	Alanyaspor	1–1	Beşiktaş	Alanya
19:00				Stadium: Alanya Oba Stadium

18 May 2024 37	Beşiktaş	2–2	Hatayspor	Istanbul
19:00	Fernandes 50'; Aboubakar 90+7' (pen.)		Massanga 26'; Dele-Bashiru 55'	Stadium: Beşiktaş Stadium; Referee: Cihan Aydın

26 May 2024 38	Kasımpaşa	2-1	Beşiktaş	Istanbul
19:00	da Costa 4' Özcan 61'		Kılıçsoy 87'	Stadium: Recep Tayyip Erdoğan Stadium

=== Turkish Cup ===
16 January 2024 Fifth round	Beşiktaş	4–0	Eyüpspor	Istanbul
21:00	Uçan 17'; Tosun 36' (pen.), 68'; Rebić 87'			Stadium: Beşiktaş Park

8 February 2024 Round of 16	Antalyaspor	1–2	Beşiktaş	Antalya
20:45	Bytyqi 30'		Muleka 72', 89'	Stadium: Corendon Airlines Park Antalya

28 February 2024 Quarter-finals	Beşiktaş	2–0	Konyaspor	Istanbul
20:45	Uçan 32'; Tosun 58'	Report		Stadium: Beşiktaş Stadium

23 April 2024 Semi-finals; First leg	MKE Ankaragücü	0–0	Beşiktaş	Ankara
20:30				Stadium: Eryaman Stadium

7 May 2024 Semi-finals; Second leg	Beşiktaş	1–0	MKE Ankaragücü	Istanbul
20:30	Muçi 70'			Stadium: Beşiktaş Stadium; Referee: Zorbay Küçük

23 May 2024 Final	Beşiktaş	3–2	Trabzonspor	Istanbul
20:45 TRT (UTC+3)	Ghezzal 45+3' (pen.); Uçan 54'; Svensson (yellow card) 79'; Al-Musrati 90+4', (yellow card) 90+5'		Onuachu 13'; Meunier (yellow card) 52'; Bardhi (yellow card) 83'; Pépé 89'	Stadium: Atatürk Olympic Stadium; Referee: Ali Şansalan

=== UEFA Europa Conference League ===
==== Second qualifying round ====
The draw for the second qualifying round was held on 21 June 2023.

27 July 2023 First leg	Beşiktaş (Turkey)	3–1	(Albania) Tirana	Istanbul, Turkey
21:00 UTC+3	Bulut 21'; Muleka 42'; Kılıçsoy 90+4'	Report	Doka (yellow card) 36'; Hila (yellow card) 80'; Kaina 83'	Stadium: Beşiktaş Stadium; Attendance: 22,820; Referee: Daniel Schlager (Germany)

3 August 2023 Second leg	Tirana (Albania)	0–2 (1–5 agg.)	(Turkey) Beşiktaş	Tirana, Albania
20:00 UTC+2	Hoxhallari (yellow card) 74'	Report	Amartey 57'; Masuaku (red card) 66'; Aboubakar 75'	Stadium: Arena Kombëtare; Attendance: 10,865; Referee: Stuart Attwell (England)

==== Third qualifying round ====
The draw for the third qualifying round was held on 24 July 2023.

10 August 2023 Second leg	Neftchi Baku (Azerbaijan)	1–3	(Turkey) Beşiktaş	Baku, Azerbaijan
21:00 UTC+4	Jaber (yellow card) 56'; Saief (yellow card) 76'; Lebon 79'; Mahmudov (yellow card) 84'	Report	Aboubakar 14'; Muleka 23'; Uçan 62'; Rosier (yellow card) 87'	Stadium: Neftçi Arena; Attendance: 11,000; Referee: Lukas Fähndrich (Switzerland)

17 August 2023 First leg	Beşiktaş (Turkey)	2–1 (5–2 agg.)	(Azerbaijan) Neftchi Baku	Istanbul, Turkey
20:00 UTC+3	Aboubakar 57'; Muleka 71'	Report	Mahmudov 36'	Stadium: Beşiktaş Stadium; Attendance: 21,890; Referee: Julian Weinberger (Austria)

==== Play-off round ====
The draw for the play-off round was held on 7 August 2023.

24 August 2023 First leg	Dynamo Kyiv (Ukraine)	2–3	(Turkey) Beşiktaş	Bucharest, Romania
20:00 UTC+3	Shaparenko 60'; Voloshyn 65'; Dubinchak (yellow card) 90+1'	Report	Aboubakar 40' (pen.); Colley 63'; Rosier (yellow card) 79'; Hadžiahmetović (yellow card) 89'; Zaynutdinov 90+4'	Stadium: Stadionul Rapid-Giulești; Referee: Darren England (England)
Note: Due to the Russian invasion of Ukraine, Ukrainian teams are required to play their home matches at neutral venues until further notice.

31 August 2023 Second leg	Beşiktaş (Turkey)	1–0 (4–2 agg.)	(Ukraine) Dynamo Kyiv	Istanbul, Turkey
21:00 UTC+3	Bulut (yellow card) 33'; Colley (yellow card) 34'; Aboubakar 52', (yellow card) 53'; Rosier (yellow card) 58'; Muleka (yellow card) 72'; Uçan (yellow card) 82'	Report	Shaparenko (yellow card) 30'; Sydorchuk (yellow card) 39'; Popov (yellow card) 48'	Stadium: Beşiktaş Stadium; Attendance: 33,376; Referee: João Pinheiro (Portugal)

==== Group stage ====
The draw for the group stage was held on 1 September 2023.

Pos	Team	Pld	W	D	L	GF	GA	GD	Pts	Qualification	BRU	BOD	BEŞ	LUG
1	(Belgium) Club Brugge	6	5	1	0	15	3	+12	16	Advance to round of 16	—	3–1	1–1	2–0
2	(Norway) Bodø/Glimt	6	3	1	2	11	8	+3	10	Advance to knockout round play-offs	0–1	—	3–1	5–2
3	(Turkey) Beşiktaş	6	1	1	4	7	14	−7	4 (Note: Ranked on head-to-head goal difference: Beşiktaş +1, Lugano –1.)		0–5	1–2	—	2–3
4	(Switzerland) Lugano	6	1	1	4	6	14	−8	4		1–3	0–0	0–2	—

Source: UEFA
Rules for classification: Group stage tiebreakers
Notes:

21 September 2023 1	Club Brugge (Belgium)	1–1	(Turkey) Beşiktaş	Jan Breydel Stadium, Bruges
21:00	Vanaken 77'	Report	Tosun 88'	Attendance: 18,442; Referee: Aleksei Kulbakov (Belarus)

5 October 2023 2	Beşiktaş (Turkey)	2–3	(Switzerland) Lugano	Beşiktaş Park, Istanbul
18:45 (19:45 TRT)	Aboubakar 38', 52'	Report	Aliseda 81'; Vladi 86'; Bailly 90' (o.g.)	Attendance: 24,648; Referee: David Fuxman (Israel)

26 October 2023 3	Bodø/Glimt (Norway)	3–1	(Turkey) Beşiktaş	Aspmyra Stadion, Bodø
21:00	Grønbæk 29'; Moumbagna 58'; Saltnes 87'	Report	Moe 90+1' (o.g.)	Attendance: 7,115; Referee: Nenad Minaković (Serbia)

9 November 2023 4	Beşiktaş (Turkey)	1–2	(Norway) Bodø/Glimt	Beşiktaş Park, Istanbul
18:45 (20:45 TRT)	Bingöl 64'	Report	Moumbagna 38', 49'	Attendance: 17,314; Referee: Sander van der Eijk (Netherlands)

30 November 2023 5	Beşiktaş (Turkey)	0–5	(Belgium) Club Brugge	Beşiktaş Park, Istanbul
18:45 (20:45 TRT)		Report	Nielsen 4'; Thiago 14', 46'; Onyedika 50'; Skov Olsen 70'	Attendance: 13,021; Referee: David Šmajc (Slovenia)

14 December 2023 6	Lugano (Switzerland)	0–2	(Turkey) Beşiktaş	Letzigrund, Zürich
21:00		Report	Tosun 36'; Terzi 88'	Attendance: 5,476; Referee: Paweł Raczkowski (Poland)

== Statistics ==
=== Squad appearances and goals ===
No.	Pos	Nat	Player	Total		Süper Lig		Turkish Cup		UEFA Europa Conference League	
No.	Pos	Nat	Player	Apps	Goals	Apps	Goals	Apps	Goals	Apps	Goals
Goalkeepers
1	GK	(Turkey) TUR	Ersin Destanoğlu	14	0	8+3	0	0	0	3	0
34	GK	(Turkey) TUR	Mert Günok	45	0	30	0	6	0	9	0
94	GK	(Turkey) TUR	Göktuğ Baytekin	0	0	0	0	0	0	0	0
97	GK	(Turkey) TUR	Utku Yuvakuran	0	0	0	0	0	0	0	0
Defenders
2	DF	(Norway) NOR	Jonas Svensson	15	0	10	0	4+1	0	0	0
4	DF	(Turkey) TUR	Onur Bulut	42	1	23+5	0	2	0	8+4	1
5	DF	(Turkey) TUR	Tayyip Talha Sanuç	9	0	6+2	0	0+1	0	0	0
6	DF	(The Gambia) GAM	Omar Colley	33	8	22	7	3	0	8	1
12	DF	(Ghana) GHA	Daniel Amartey	27	1	12+6	0	1+1	0	5+2	1
14	DF	(Turkey) TUR	Emrecan Uzunhan	1	0	0+1	0	0	0	0	0
17	DF	(England) ENG	Joe Worrall	9	1	5+1	1	1+2	0	0	0
26	DF	(Democratic Republic of the Congo) COD	Arthur Masuaku	29	0	16+2	0	3+1	0	6+1	0
60	DF	(Turkey) TUR	Aytuğ Batur Kömeç	2	0	0	0	0	0	0+2	0
75	DF	(Turkey) TUR	Tayfur Bingöl	17	1	5+7	0	0+2	0	2+1	1
77	DF	(Turkey) TUR	Umut Meraş	14	0	6+1	0	3	0	2+2	0
79	DF	(Turkey) TUR	Emrecan Terzi	12	1	5+5	0	0+1	0	1	1
Midfielders
8	MF	(Turkey) TUR	Salih Uçan	38	5	18+5	1	4+1	3	8+2	1
15	MF	(England) ENG	Alex Oxlade-Chamberlain	30	4	11+9	4	0+2	0	5+3	0
19	MF	(Bosnia and Herzegovina) BIH	Amir Hadžiahmetović	30	0	17+1	0	0	0	10+2	0
20	MF	(Turkey) TUR	Necip Uysal	43	0	25+5	0	6	0	6+1	0
21	MF	(Turkey) TUR	Demir Ege Tıknaz	35	0	21+6	0	1	0	3+4	0
22	MF	(Kazakhstan) KAZ	Bakhtiyar Zaynutdinov	37	1	20+7	0	2+1	0	3+4	1
23	MF	(Albania) ALB	Ernest Muçi	17	4	12+1	3	4	1	0	0
28	MF	(Libya) LBA	Al-Musrati	13	1	7+2	0	4	1	0	0
44	MF	(Turkey) TUR	Fahri Ay	2	0	1+1	0	0	0	0	0
83	MF	(Portugal) POR	Gedson Fernandes	45	3	28+1	3	5+1	0	8+2	0
88	MF	(Switzerland) SUI	Gökhan Inler	0	0	0	0	0	0	0	0
-	MF	(Turkey) TUR	Berkay Vardar	0	0	0	0	0	0	0	0
Forwards
7	FW	(Croatia) CRO	Ante Rebić	23	1	3+12	0	2	1	2+4	0
9	FW	(Turkey) TUR	Cenk Tosun	47	11	22+12	6	2+3	3	4+4	2
10	FW	(Cameroon) CMR	Vincent Aboubakar	34	12	10+12	5	0+2	0	9+1	7
11	FW	(Kosovo) KOS	Milot Rashica	41	5	25+4	5	4+2	0	4+2	0
18	FW	(Algeria) ALG	Rachid Ghezzal	34	2	11+16	1	4+1	1	2	0
40	FW	(Democratic Republic of the Congo) COD	Jackson Muleka	47	9	18+12	4	2+3	2	9+3	3
62	FW	(Turkey) TUR	Cemal Azad Demir	1	0	0+1	0	0	0	0	0
64	FW	(Turkey) TUR	Mustafa Erhan Hekimoğlu	8	0	1+5	0	0+1	0	0+1	0
65	FW	(Turkey) TUR	Yakup Arda Kılıç	2	0	0+2	0	0	0	0	0
90	FW	(Turkey) TUR	Semih Kılıçsoy	35	12	20+3	11	3+2	0	1+6	1
Players transferred out during the season
26	DF	(France) FRA	Valentin Rosier	21	0	10+2	0	0	0	9	0
30	DF	(Ivory Coast) CIV	Eric Bailly	8	0	5	0	0	0	3	0
27	MF	(Turkey) TUR	Emirhan Delibaş	2	0	0+1	0	0	0	0+1	0
71	MF	(Cameroon) CMR	Jean Onana	10	0	0+4	0	0	0	2+4	0
99	FW	(Turkey) TUR	Emrecan Bulut	0	0	0	0	0	0	0	0

Last updated: 26 May 2024
Source: Competitions
