= 2022–23 Beşiktaş J.K. season =

Beşiktaş
2022–23 season
- President: Ahmet Nur Çebi
- Head coach: Valérien Ismaël (until 26 October 2022); Şenol Güneş (from 28 October 2022)
- Stadium: Vodafone Park
- Süper Lig: 3rd
- Turkish Cup: Round of 16
- Top goalscorer: League: Cenk Tosun (15); All: Cenk Tosun (18)
| Home colours | Away colours | Third colours |

The 2022–23 season was the 120th season in the existence of Beşiktaş J.K. and the club's 63rd consecutive season in the top flight of Turkish football. In addition to the domestic league, Beşiktaş participated in this season's editions of the Turkish Cup.

== Season events ==
On 8 February, Beşiktaş announced the signing of Onur Bulut from Kayserispor, on a contract until the end of the 2025/26 season.

On 9 February, Beşiktaş announced the signing of Omar Colley from Sampdoria, on a contract until the end of the 2024/25 season, with an option for an additional year.

On 17 February, Beşiktaş announced the signing of Alexandru Maxim on loan from Gaziantep until the end of the season, whilst Josef de Souza was released by the club.

== Squad ==
As of match played 7 June 2023

| No. | Name | Nationality | Position | Date of birth (age) | Signed from | Signed In | Contract ends | Apps. | Goals |
Goalkeepers
| 1 | Ersin Destanoğlu | (Turkey) | GK | 1 January 2001 (aged 22) | Academy | 2018 | 2023 | 92 | 0 |
| 34 | Mert Günok | (Turkey) | GK | 1 March 1989 (aged 34) | İstanbul Başakşehir | 2021 | 2024 | 29 | 0 |
| 97 | Utku Yuvakuran | (Turkey) | GK | 2 November 1997 (aged 25) | Beylerbeyi | 2017 | 2024 | 8 | 0 |
| 99 | Emre Bilgin | (Turkey) | GK | 26 February 2004 (aged 19) | Academy | 2020 | 2025 | 5 | 0 |
Defenders
| 2 | Valentin Rosier | (France) | DF | 19 August 1996 (aged 26) | Sporting CP | 2021 | 2025 | 105 | 6 |
| 3 | Tayyip Talha Sanuç | (Turkey) | DF | 17 December 1999 (aged 23) | Adana Demirspor | 2022 | 2026 | 22 | 2 |
| 4 | Onur Bulut | (Turkey) | DF | 16 April 1994 (aged 29) | Kayserispor | 2023 | 2026 | 8 | 0 |
| 6 | Omar Colley | (The Gambia) | DF | 24 October 1992 (aged 30) | Sampdoria | 2023 | 2025 (+1) | 10 | 0 |
| 23 | Welinton | (Brazil) | DF | 10 April 1989 (aged 34) | Alanyaspor | 2020 | 2023 | 86 | 1 |
| 25 | Arthur Masuaku | (Democratic Republic of the Congo) | DF | 7 November 1993 (aged 29) | loan from West Ham United | 2022 | 2023 | 32 | 2 |
| 26 | Romain Saïss | (Morocco) | DF | 26 March 1990 (aged 33) | Wolverhampton Wanderers | 2022 | 2024 | 26 | 1 |
| 77 | Umut Meraş | (Turkey) | DF | 20 December 1995 (aged 27) | Le Havre | 2021 | 2024(+1) | 45 | 0 |
Midfielders
| 7 | Georges-Kévin Nkoudou | (Cameroon) | MF | 13 February 1995 (aged 28) | Tottenham Hotspur | 2019 | 2023 | 108 | 21 |
| 8 | Salih Uçan | (Turkey) | MF | 6 January 1994 (aged 29) | Alanyaspor | 2021 | 2023 | 47 | 3 |
| 11 | Dele Alli | (England) | MF | 11 April 1996 (aged 27) | loan from Everton | 2022 | 2023 | 15 | 3 |
| 13 | Atiba Hutchinson | (Canada) | MF | 8 February 1983 (aged 40) | PSV Eindhoven | 2013 | 2023 | 334 | 27 |
| 15 | Nathan Redmond | (England) | MF | 11 April 1996 (aged 27) | Southampton | 2022 | 2023 | 28 | 6 |
| 17 | Kerem Atakan Kesgin | (Turkey) | MF | 5 November 2000 (aged 22) | Sivasspor | 2022 | 2026 | 8 | 0 |
| 19 | Amir Hadžiahmetović | (Bosnia and Herzegovina) | MF | 8 March 1997 (aged 26) | Konyaspor | 2023 | 2027 | 12 | 1 |
| 20 | Necip Uysal | (Turkey) | MF | 24 January 1991 (aged 32) | Academy | 2009 | 2025 | 420 | 6 |
| 22 | Berkay Vardar | (Turkey) | MF | 14 January 2003 (aged 20) | Academy | 2020 | 2025 | 5 | 0 |
| 44 | Alexandru Maxim | (Romania) | MF | 8 July 1990 (aged 32) | on loan from Gaziantep | 2023 | 2023 | 11 | 0 |
| 83 | Gedson Fernandes | (Portugal) | MF | 9 January 1999 (aged 24) | Benfica | 2022 | 2026 | 36 | 3 |
| 88 | Tayfur Bingöl | (Turkey) | MF | 11 January 1993 (aged 30) | loan from Alanyaspor | 2022 | 2023 | 29 | 2 |
Strikers
| 9 | Cenk Tosun | (Turkey) | FW | 7 June 1991 (aged 32) | Everton | 2022 | 2023+1 | 180 | 85 |
| 10 | Vincent Aboubakar | (Cameroon) | FW | 22 January 1992 (aged 31) | Al Nassr | 2023 | 2025 (+1) | 83 | 48 |
| 18 | Rachid Ghezzal | (Algeria) | FW | 9 May 1992 (aged 31) | Leicester City | 2021 | 2024 | 89 | 15 |
| 35 | Semih Kılıçsoy | (Turkey) | FW | 15 August 2005 (aged 17) | Academy | 2023 | | 4 | 0 |
| 40 | Jackson Muleka | (Democratic Republic of the Congo) | FW | 4 October 1999 (aged 23) | Standard Liège | 2022 | 2027 | 32 | 6 |
U19
| | Göktuğ Baytekin | (Turkey) | GK | 20 November 2004 (aged 18) | Academy | 2021 | 2023 | 0 | 0 |
| | Badra Cisse | (Ivory Coast) | DF | 20 March 2003 (aged 20) | Academy | 2022 | | 0 | 0 |
| | Aytuğ Batur Kömeç | (Turkey) | DF | 5 October 2004 (aged 18) | Academy | 2022 | 2024 | 0 | 0 |
| | Necati Bilgiç | (Turkey) | MF | 8 March 2004 (aged 19) | Academy | 2020 | 2025 | 0 | 0 |
| | Demir Ege Tıknaz | (Turkey) | MF | 17 August 2004 (aged 18) | Academy | 2022 | 2023 | 0 | 0 |
| | Semih Kılıçsoy | (Turkey) | FW | 15 August 2005 (aged 17) | Academy | 2022 | 2024 | 0 | 0 |
Out on loan
| 4 | Javi Montero | (Spain) | DF | 14 January 1999 (aged 24) | Atlético Madrid | 2021 | 2025 | 46 | 2 |
| 6 | Kartal Yılmaz | (Turkey) | MF | 4 November 2000 (aged 22) | Academy | 2020 | 2024 | 12 | 0 |
| 14 | Emrecan Uzunhan | (Turkey) | DF | 26 February 2001 (aged 22) | İstanbulspor | 2022 | 2027 | 6 | 0 |
| 19 | Ajdin Hasić | (Bosnia and Herzegovina) | MF | 7 October 2001 (aged 21) | Dinamo Zagreb | 2020 | 2024 | 12 | 2 |
| 21 | Emirhan Delibaş | (Turkey) | MF | 1 January 2003 (aged 20) | Academy | 2022 | 2025 | 0 | 0 |
| 33 | Oğuzhan Akgün | (Turkey) | FW | 13 July 2001 (aged 21) | Academy | 2018 | 2025 | 1 | 0 |
| | Kerem Kalafat | (Turkey) | DF | 9 March 2001 (aged 22) | Academy | 2019 | 2023 | 4 | 0 |
| | Erdoğan Kaya | (Turkey) | DF | 27 March 2001 (aged 22) | Academy | 2020 | 2025 | 4 | 1 |
| | Atakan Üner | (Turkey) | MF | 16 June 1999 (aged 23) | Altınordu | 2020 | 2024 | 4 | 0 |
| | Ahmet Gülay | (Turkey) | DF | 13 January 2003 (aged 20) | Academy | 2020 | 2023 | 0 | 0 |
| | Bilal Ceylan | (Turkey) | DF | 7 September 2003 (aged 19) | Eskişehirspor | 2021 | 2023 | 0 | 0 |
Players who left during the season
| 3 | Rıdvan Yılmaz | (Turkey) | DF | 21 May 2001 (aged 22) | Academy | 2019 | 2023 | 62 | 4 |
| 5 | Josef de Souza | (Brazil) | MF | 11 February 1989 (aged 34) | Al-Ahli | 2020 | 2023 | 88 | 9 |
| 10 | Wout Weghorst | (Netherlands) | FW | 7 August 1992 (aged 30) | loan from Burnley | 2022 | 2023 | 18 | 9 |
| 17 | Emirhan Ilkhan | (Turkey) | MF | 1 June 2004 (aged 19) | Academy | 2021 | 2025 | 12 | 1 |
| 28 | Kenan Karaman | (Turkey) | FW | 5 March 1994 (aged 29) | Fortuna Düsseldorf | 2021 | 2024 | 37 | 2 |
| 30 | Tyler Boyd | (United States) | FW | 30 December 1994 (aged 28) | Vitória | 2019 | 2023 | 35 | 4 |
| | Serdar Saatçı | (Turkey) | DF | 14 February 2003 (aged 20) | Academy | 2020 | 2023 | 15 | 1 |
| | Álmos Kaan Kalafat | (Hungary) | FW | 4 September 2001 (aged 21) | Academy | 2018 | 2023 | 0 | 0 |

=== Out on loan ===
Note: Flags indicate national team as defined under FIFA eligibility rules; some limited exceptions apply. Players may hold more than one non-FIFA nationality.

| No. | Pos. | Nation | Player |
|---|---|---|---|
| — | DF | TUR | Bilal Ceylan (at Nazilli Belediyespor until 30 June 2023) |
| — | DF | TUR | Ahmet Gülay (at Alanyaspor until 30 June 2024) |
| — | DF | TUR | Kerem Kalafat (at Çaykur Rizespor until 30 June 2023) |
| — | DF | TUR | Erdoğan Kaya (at Düzcespor until 30 June 2023) |
| — | DF | TUR | Emrecan Uzunhan (at Antalyaspor until 30 June 2023) |
| — | DF | ESP | Javi Montero (at Hamburger SV until 30 June 2023) |
| — | MF | BIH | Ajdin Hasić (at Göztepe until 30 June 2023) |

| No. | Pos. | Nation | Player |
|---|---|---|---|
| — | MF | TUR | Abdullah Aydın (at Ankara Keçiörengücü until 30 June 2023) |
| — | MF | TUR | Atamer Bilgin (at Etimesgut Belediyespor until 30 June 2023) |
| — | MF | TUR | İlkay İşler (at Düzcespor until 30 June 2023) |
| — | MF | TUR | Atakan Üner (at Tuzlaspor until 30 June 2023) |
| — | MF | TUR | Emre Yıldız (at Elazığspor until 30 June 2023) |
| — | MF | TUR | Kartal Yılmaz (at Ümraniyespor until 30 June 2023) |
| — | FW | TUR | Oğuzhan Akgün (at Sakaryaspor until 30 June 2023) |

== Transfers ==
=== In ===
| Date | Position | Nationality | Name | From | Fee | Ref. |
|---|---|---|---|---|---|---|
| 1 July 2022 | MF | (Morocco) | Romain Saïss | Wolverhampton Wanderers | Free | |
| 1 July 2022 | MF | (Portugal) | Gedson Fernandes | Benfica | €6,000,000 | |
| 2 July 2022 | FW | (Turkey) | Cenk Tosun | Everton | Free | |
| 7 July 2022 | FW | (Democratic Republic of the Congo) | Jackson Muleka | Alanyaspor | €3,350,000 | |
| 19 July 2022 | DF | (Turkey) | Emrecan Uzunhan | İstanbulspor | Undisclosed | |
| 23 August 2022 | MF | (Turkey) | Kerem Kesgin | Sivasspor | Undisclosed | |
| 8 September 2022 | MF | (England) | Nathan Redmond | Southampton | Undisclosed | |
| 9 September 2022 | DF | (Turkey) | Tayyip Sanuç | Adana Demirspor | Undisclosed | |
| 21 January 2023 | FW | (Cameroon) | Vincent Aboubakar | Al Nassr | Undisclosed | |
| 2 February 2023 | MF | (Bosnia and Herzegovina) | Amir Hadžiahmetović | Konyaspor | €3,200,000 | |
| 8 February 2023 | MF | (Turkey) | Onur Bulut | Kayserispor | Undisclosed | |
| 9 February 2023 | DF | (The Gambia) | Omar Colley | Sampdoria | €2,300,000 | |

=== Loans in ===
| Date from | Position | Nationality | Name | From | Date to | Ref. |
|---|---|---|---|---|---|---|
| 5 July 2022 | FW | (Netherlands) | Wout Weghorst | Burnley | End of season | |
| 2 August 2022 | DF | (Democratic Republic of the Congo) | Arthur Masuaku | West Ham United | End of season | |
| 25 August 2022 | MF | (England) | Dele Alli | Everton | End of season | |
| 8 September 2022 | DF | (Turkey) | Tayfur Bingöl | Alanyaspor | End of season | |
| 17 February 2023 | MF | (Romania) | Alexandru Maxim | Gaziantep | End of season | |

=== Out ===
| Date | Position | Nationality | Name | To | Fee | Ref. |
|---|---|---|---|---|---|---|
| 25 July 2022 | DF | (Turkey) | Rıdvan Yılmaz | Rangers | €6,250,000 | |
| 10 August 2022 | MF | (Turkey) | Emirhan İlkhan | Torino | €4,500,000 | |

=== Loans out ===
| Date from | Position | Nationality | Name | To | Date to | Ref. |
|---|---|---|---|---|---|---|
| 29 June 2022 | DF | (Turkey) | Kerem Kalafat | Çaykur Rizespor | End of season | |
| 25 August 2022 | MF | (Turkey) | Kartal Yılmaz | Ümraniyespor | End of season | |
| 8 September 2022 | MF | (Bosnia and Herzegovina) | Ajdin Hasić | Göztepe | End of season | |
| 8 September 2022 | MF | (Turkey) | Emirhan Delibaş | Göztepe | End of season | |
| 15 January 2023 | DF | (Spain) | Javi Montero | Hamburger SV | End of season | |
| 16 February 2023 | DF | (Turkey) | Emrecan Uzunhan | Antalyaspor | End of season | |
| 16 February 2023 | FW | (Turkey) | Oğuzhan Akgün | Sakaryaspor | End of season | |

=== Released ===
| Date | Position | Nationality | Name | Joined | Date | Ref |
|---|---|---|---|---|---|---|
| 2 July 2022 | MF | (Brazil) | Alex Teixeira | Vasco da Gama | 13 July 2022 | |
| 1 September 2022 | FW | (Turkey) | Kenan Karaman | Schalke 04 | 1 September 2022 | |
| 4 November 2022 | FW | (United States) | Tyler Boyd | LA Galaxy | 20 February 2023 | |
| 17 February 2023 | MF | (Brazil) | Josef de Souza | Beijing Guoan | | |

== Friendlies ==
Win Draw Loss Fixtures

| 9 July 2022 | Beşiktaş | 2–1 | Werder Bremen | Innsbruck, Austria |
| 17:00 TRT (UTC+3) | Uçan 68' (pen.); Akgün 77' | Report | Dinkçi 48' | Stadium: Tivoli Stadion Tirol |

| 12 July 2022 | Beşiktaş | 0–0 | Viktoria Plzeň | Kufstein, Austria |
| 17:00 TRT (UTC+3) | | Report | | Stadium: Kufstein Arena |

| 15 July 2022 | Beşiktaş | 1–0 | Mainz | Kufstein, Austria |
| 19:00 TRT (UTC+3) | Tosun 24' | Report | | Stadium: Kufstein Arena |

| 23 July 2022 | Wolverhampton Wanderers | 3–0 | Beşiktaş | Alicante, Spain |
| 20:00 TRT (UTC+3) | Jimenez 15'; Podence 29'; Neto 40' | Report | | Stadium: Estadi Olímpic Camilo Cano |

| 26 July 2022 | Deportivo Alavés | 2–1 | Beşiktaş | Alicante, Spain |
| 20:00 TRT (UTC+3) | Guridi 54' de la Fuente 66' | Report | Muleka 2' | Stadium: Estadi Olímpic Camilo Cano |

| 30 July 2022 | Beşiktaş | 1–1 | Sampdoria | Istanbul |
| 19:00 TRT (UTC+3) | Weghorst 65' | Report | Sabiri 37' | Stadium: Vodafone Park |

| 29 November 2022 | Beşiktaş | 4–0 | İstanbulspor | Istanbul |
| 19:00 TRT (UTC+3) | Redmond 23'; Uzunhan (yellow card) 28'; Vardar (yellow card) 41'; Tosun 47' (pen.); Kesgin 48'; Alli 51' | Report | | Stadium: Vodafone Park |

| 2 December 2022 | Beşiktaş | 1–1 | Fatih Karagümrük | Istanbul |
| 19:00 TRT (UTC+3) | Kesgin 85' | Report | Kazim-Richards 33' | Stadium: Vodafone Park |

| 8 December 2022 | Beşiktaş | 2–1 | Charleroi | Antalya |
| 19:00 TRT (UTC+3) | Muleka 16'; Sanuç 39' | Report | Hosseinzadeh 50' | Stadium: Antalya Gloria Sports Arena |

| 11 December 2022 | Beşiktaş | 1–0 | Westerlo | Antalya |
| 19:00 TRT (UTC+3) | Redmond 86' | Report | | Stadium: Antalya Gloria Sports Arena |

| 15 December 2022 | Beşiktaş | 5–3 | Giresunspor | Antalya |
| 14:00 TRT (UTC+3) | Fernandes 30', 46'; Nkoudou 45'; Tosun 69', 86' | Report | Pérez (yellow card) 22'; Serginho 51'; Can Davas 81'; Savićević 90' | Stadium: Antalya Gloria Sports Arena |

| 12 April 2023 | Beşiktaş | 2–0 | Atlético Madrid | Istanbul |
| 20:30 TRT (UTC+3) | Fernandes 25'; Welinton (yellow card) 81'; Nkoudou 88' | Report | | Stadium: Vodafone Park |

| 13 May 2023 | Sabah | 3–3 | Beşiktaş | Baku, Azerbaijan |
| 17:00 TRT (UTC+3) | Kashchuk 3', 5'; Mickels (penalty missed) 42' (yellow card) 62'; Irazabal (yellow card) 61'; Volkovi 70'; Nuriyev (yellow card) 78' | Report | Meraş 24', 44'; Tosun 63' (pen.) | Stadium: Tofiq Bahramov Republican Stadium |

== Competitions ==
=== Overview ===
| Competition | First match | Last match | Starting round | Final position | Record | | | | | | | |
| Competition | First match | Last match | Starting round | Final position | Pld | W | D | L | GF | GA | GD | Win % |
|---|---|---|---|---|---|---|---|---|---|---|---|---|
| Süper Lig | 7 August 2022 | 7 June 2023 | Matchday 1 | 3rd | 36 | 23 | 9 | 4 | 78 | 36 | +42 | 63.89 |
| Turkish Cup | 9 November 2022 | 18 January 2023 | Fourth round | Round of 16 | 3 | 2 | 1 | 0 | 8 | 4 | +4 | 66.67 |
| Total | | | | | 39 | 25 | 10 | 4 | 86 | 40 | +46 | 64.10 |

Source: Maçkolik

=== Süper Lig ===
==== League table ====
| Pos | Team | Pld | W | D | L | GF | GA | GD | Pts | Qualification or relegation |
|---|---|---|---|---|---|---|---|---|---|---|
| 1 | Galatasaray (C) | 36 | 28 | 4 | 4 | 83 | 27 | +56 | 88 | Qualification for the Champions League second qualifying round |
| 2 | Fenerbahçe | 36 | 25 | 5 | 6 | 87 | 42 | +45 | 80 | Qualification for the Europa Conference League second qualifying round |
| 3 | Beşiktaş | 36 | 23 | 9 | 4 | 78 | 36 | +42 | 78 | Qualification for the Europa Conference League second qualifying round |
| 4 | Adana Demirspor | 36 | 20 | 9 | 7 | 76 | 45 | +31 | 69 | Qualification for the Europa Conference League second qualifying round |
| 5 | Başakşehir | 36 | 18 | 8 | 10 | 54 | 37 | +17 | 62 | |

Source: Süper Lig
Rules for classification: 1) Points; 2) Head-to-head points; 3) Head-to-head goal difference; 4) Head-to-head goals scored; 5) Goal difference; 6) Goals scored; 7) Play-off.
(C) Champions

==== Results summary ====
| Overall | | | | | | | | Home | | | | | | Away | | | | | |
| Pld | W | D | L | GF | GA | GD | Pts | W | D | L | GF | GA | GD | W | D | L | GF | GA | GD |
|---|---|---|---|---|---|---|---|---|---|---|---|---|---|---|---|---|---|---|---|
| 36 | 23 | 9 | 4 | 78 | 36 | +42 | 78 | 13 | 4 | 1 | 41 | 15 | +26 | 10 | 5 | 3 | 37 | 21 | +16 |

Source: See Results

==== Results by round ====
| Round | 1 | 2 | 3 | 4 | 5 | 6 | 7 | 8 | 9 | 10 | 11 | 12 | 13 | 14 | 15 | 16 | 17 | 18 | 19 | 20 | 21 | 22 | 23 | 24 | 25 | 26 | 27 | 28 | 29 | 30 | 31 | 32 | 33 | 34 | 35 | 36 | 37 | 38 |
|---|---|---|---|---|---|---|---|---|---|---|---|---|---|---|---|---|---|---|---|---|---|---|---|---|---|---|---|---|---|---|---|---|---|---|---|---|---|---|
| Ground | H | A | H | H | A | H | A | H | A | H | A | H | A | H | A | H | | H | A | A | H | A | A | H | A | H | A | H | A | H | A | H | A | H | A | | A | H |
| Result | W | D | W | W | W | L | D | D | W | D | L | W | L | D | D | W | B | W | W | W | W | D | L | W | W | W | W | W | D | W | W | W | W | W | W | B | W | D |
| Position | 5 | 6 | 3 | 1 | 1 | 3 | 4 | 6 | 2 | 4 | 5 | 4 | 6 | 5 | 5 | 5 | 4 | 4 | 4 | 4 | 4 | 4 | 3 | 3 | 3 | 3 | 3 | 3 | 3 | 3 | 3 | 3 | 3 | 3 | 3 | 3 | 3 | 3 |

Source: TFF.org
A = Away; H = Home; B = Bye; W = Win; D = Draw; L = Loss

==== Matches ====
| 7 August 2022 1 | Beşiktaş | 1–0 | Kayserispor | Istanbul |
| 21:45 TRT (UTC+3) | Fernandes (yellow card) 77'; Tosun (yellow card) 90+1' (yellow-red card) 90+3'; Ghezzal 90+6'; Uysal (yellow card) 90+9' | Report | Karimi (yellow card) 59' (yellow-red card) 67' | Stadium: Vodafone Park; Attendance: 33,046; Referee: Ümit Öztürk |

| 14 August 2022 2 | Alanyaspor | 3–3 | Beşiktaş | Antalya |
| 21:45 TRT (UTC+3) | Fer (yellow card) 26'; Aksoy (yellow card) 41'; Bekiroğlu 45+3'; Candeias (yellow card) 64', (goal) 90+2' (pen.); Saïss 81' (o.g.) | Report | Nkoudou (yellow card) 1', (goal) 3'; Uzunhan (yellow card) 15' (yellow-red card) 37'; Weghorst (yellow card) 19'; Uçan 20'; Ghezzal 31' (pen.) | Stadium: Bahçeşehir Okulları Stadium; Attendance: 6,049; Referee: Yasin Kol |

| 21 August 2022 3 | Beşiktaş | 4–1 | Fatih Karagümrük | Istanbul |
| 21:45 TRT (UTC+3) | Weghorst 17'; Nkoudou 34'; Muleka (yellow card) 40', (goal) 50'; Vardar (yellow card) 42'; Uçan (yellow card) 67'; Rosier 90' | Report | Ozdoyev (yellow card) 7'; Diagne (yellow card) 43', (goal) 53'; Erkin 90+2' | Stadium: Vodafone Park; Attendance: 33,444; Referee: Arda Kardeşler |

| 28 August 2022 4 | Beşiktaş | 3–1 | Sivasspor | Istanbul |
| 21:45 TRT (UTC+3) | Muleka 12', 41'; Weghorst 29' | Report | Yeşilyurt (yellow card) 39'; Arslan (yellow card) 83'; Saba 86' | Stadium: Vodafone Park; Attendance: 34,820; Referee: Volkan Bayarslan |

| 4 September 2022 5 | MKE Ankaragücü | 2–3 | Beşiktaş | Ankara |
| 21:45 TRT (UTC+3) | Beridze 26', 47'; Macheda (yellow card) 61'; Marlon (yellow card) 82' (yellow-red card) 90+4'; Güngördü (yellow card) 90+6' | Report | Muleka 30'; Alli 35'; Nkoudou 74' (pen.); Rosier (yellow card) 90+6'; Souza (red card) | Stadium: Eryaman Stadium; Attendance: 17,265; Referee: Mete Kalkavan |

| 12 September 2022 6 | Beşiktaş | 0–1 | İstanbul Başakşehir | Istanbul |
| 19:00 TRT (UTC+3) | Uçan (yellow card) 58'; Saïss (yellow card) 86'; Sanuç (yellow card) 90+4' | Report | Caiçara (yellow card) 63'; Traoré 71'; Duarte (yellow card) 76'; Ndayishimiye (yellow card) 82'; Türüç (yellow card) 90'; Okaka (yellow card) 90+4' | Stadium: Vodafone Park; Attendance: 35,288; Referee: Halil Umut Meler |

| 17 September 2022 7 | İstanbulspor | 2–2 | Beşiktaş | Istanbul |
| 20:00 TRT (UTC+3) | Destanoğlu 26' (o.g.); Kabasakal (yellow card) 45+4'; Yaşar 86' | Report | Nkoudou 8'; Souza (yellow card) 30'; Weghorst 39'; Welinton (yellow card) 84'; Redmond (yellow card) 90+3' | Stadium: Esenyurt Necmi Kadıoğlu Stadium; Referee: Zorbay Küçük |

| 2 October 2022 8 | Beşiktaş | 0–0 | Fenerbahçe | Istanbul |
| 20:00 TRT (UTC+3) | Masuaku (yellow card) 45'; Fernandes (yellow card) 90+3' | Report | Crespo (yellow card) 42'; Batshuayi (yellow card) 83' | Stadium: Vodafone Park; Referee: Volkan Bayarslan |

| 8 October 2022 9 | Giresunspor | 0–1 | Beşiktaş | Giresun |
| 20:00 TRT (UTC+3) | Akpınar (yellow card) 13'; Arias (yellow card) 31'; Campuzano (yellow card) 45+3'; Sainz (yellow card) 54' | Report | Weghorst (penalty missed) 20'; Rosier (yellow card) 26'; Sanuç 34'; Fernandes (yellow card) 71'; Tosun (yellow card) 79' | Stadium: Çotanak Sports Complex; Referee: Yaşar Kemal Uğurlu |

| 16 October 2022 10 | Beşiktaş | 2–2 | Trabzonspor | Istanbul |
| 20:00 TRT (UTC+3) | Larsen 29' (o.g.); Tosun 70' (yellow card) 90+5'; Rosier (yellow card) 90+2'; Ghezzal (yellow card) 90+5' | Report | Gómez 11'; Bakasetas (yellow card) 32'; Trézéguet 36'; Bardhi (yellow card) 90+2'; Çakır (yellow card) 90+5'; Yazıcı (red card) 90+6' | Stadium: Vodafone Park; Referee: Ali Şansalan |

| 24 October 2022 11 | Hatayspor | 2–1 | Beşiktaş | Antakya |
| 20:00 TRT (UTC+3) | Boudjemaa (yellow card) 28'; Vranješ (yellow card) 41'; Zé Luís 49'; Çörekçi (yellow card) 90'; Kanak 90'; Ergün (yellow card) 90+5' | Report | Weghorst 1'; Redmond (yellow card) 90+2' | Stadium: New Hatay Stadium; Referee: Kadir Saglam |

| 30 October 2022 12 | Beşiktaş | 5–2 | Ümraniyespor | Istanbul |
| 17:00 TRT (UTC+3) | Tosun 4' (pen.), 62'; Weghorst 33', 78'; Masuaku (yellow card) 45+2'; Sanuç 48'; Saïss (yellow card) 73' | Report | Geraldo (yellow card) 14'; Del Valle 44'; Avounou 57'; Allyson (yellow card) 63'; Göksu (yellow card) 73' | Stadium: Vodafone Park; Referee: Tugay Numanoglu |

| 5 November 2022 13 | Galatasaray | 2–1 | Beşiktaş | Istanbul |
| 20:00 TRT (UTC+3) | Icardi 18', 59'; Mertens (yellow card) 42'; Oliveira (yellow card) 89'; Torreira (yellow card) 90+1' | Report | Tosun 28'; Souza (yellow card) 73'; Redmond (yellow card) 73'; Uysal (yellow card) 77'; Bingöl (yellow card) 90+3' | Stadium: Nef Stadium; Referee: Halil Umut Meler |

| 25 December 2022 15 | Gaziantep | 1–1 | Beşiktaş | Gaziantep |
| 16:00 TRT (UTC+3) | Güvenç (yellow card) 1'; Jevtović (yellow card) 28'; Figueiredo 71'; Ersoy (yellow card) 81'; Merkel (yellow card) 90+2' | Report | Nkoudou (yellow card) 26'; Weghorst 86'; Uçan (yellow card) 90+7' | Stadium: Gaziantep Stadium; Referee: Atilla Karaoglan |

| 29 December 2022 16 | Beşiktaş | 1–0 | Adana Demirspor | Istanbul |
| 20:00 TRT (UTC+3) | Masuaku 14'; Souza (yellow card) 45'; Weghorst (yellow card) 45+6'; Tosun (yellow card) 65'; Rosier (yellow card) 81'; Muleka (yellow card) 90+3' | Report | Ndiaye (yellow card) 13'; Akaydin (yellow card) 61' | Stadium: Vodafone Park; Referee: Ali Şansalan |

| 17 | Bye |

| 7 January 2023 18 | Beşiktaş | 2–1 | Kasımpaşa | Istanbul |
| 18:00 TRT (UTC+3) | Tosun 28'; Weghorst 45+6'; Welinton (yellow card) 53'; Uçan (yellow card) 82' | Report | Hajradinović (yellow card) 33'; Fall (yellow card) 33'; Donk (yellow card) 53'; Engin 69'; Petretta (yellow card) 77' | Stadium: Vodafone Park; Referee: Zorbay Kucuk |

| 14 January 2023 19 | Konyaspor | 1–2 | Beşiktaş | Konya |
| 15:00 TRT (UTC+3) | Günok 1' (o.g.); Demirbağ (yellow card) 30' | Report | Tosun 67'; Masuaku (yellow card) 69'; Souza 90+5' | Stadium: Konya Metropolitan Municipality Stadium; Referee: Abdulkadir Bitigen |

| 22 January 2023 20 | Kayserispor | 0–2 | Beşiktaş | Kayseri |
| 16:00 TRT (UTC+3) | Mensah (yellow card) 23' | Report | Redmond 2' (yellow card) 33'; Saïss (yellow card) 4'; Uçan 42'; Rosier (red card) 90+4' | Stadium: Kadir Has Stadium; Referee: Mete Kalkavan |

| 27 January 2023 21 | Beşiktaş | 3–0 | Alanyaspor | Istanbul |
| 20:00 TRT (UTC+3) | Tosun 20', 50'; Alli 59' | Report | Bekiroğlu (yellow card) 65'; Doumbia (yellow card) 90+3' | Stadium: Vodafone Park; Referee: Yaşar Kemal Uğurlu |

| 31 February 2023 22 | Fatih Karagümrük | 1–1 | Beşiktaş | Istanbul |
| 20:00 TRT (UTC+3) | Ozdoyev 48'; Biraschi (yellow card) 62' | Report | Tosun 33'; Fernandes (yellow card) 90+7' | Stadium: Atatürk Olympic Stadium; Referee: Ali Şansalan |

| 4 February 2023 23 | Sivasspor | 1–0 | Beşiktaş | Sivas |
| 16:00 TRT (UTC+3) | Cofie (yellow card) 20'; Sáiz 23' (yellow card) 45' | Report | Masuaku (yellow card) 45+5'; Welinton (yellow card) 88' | Stadium: New Sivas 4 Eylül Stadium; Referee: Zorbay Küçük |

| 26 February 2023 14 | Beşiktaş | 0–0 | Antalyaspor | Istanbul |
| 20:00 TRT (UTC+3) | Redmond (yellow card) 57'; Tosun (penalty missed) 90+7' | Report | Vural (yellow card) 45+3'; Mehmedi (yellow card) 56'; Floranus (yellow card) 86' | Stadium: Vodafone Park; Referee: Abdulkadir Bitigen |
Note: Match originally scheduled for 13 November 2022, but postponed on the same day due to the 2022 Istanbul bombing earlier in the day.

| 5 March 2023 24 | Beşiktaş | 2–1 | MKE Ankaragücü | Istanbul |
| 19:00 TRT (UTC+3) | Uçan 40'; Aboubakar 55'; Masuaku (yellow card) 85'; Fernandes (yellow card) 88'; Welinton (yellow card) 90+6' | Report | Sowe 53'; Mujakić (yellow card) 59' | Stadium: Vodafone Park; Referee: Volkan Bayarslan |
Note: Match originally scheduled for 10 February, but postponed due to the 2023 Turkey–Syria earthquake.

| 12 March 2023 25 | İstanbul Başakşehir | 0–2 | Beşiktaş | Istanbul |
| 19:00 TRT (UTC+3) | Januzaj (red card) 35' | Report | Colley (yellow card) 6'; Aboubakar 15'; Masuaku 55'; Hadžiahmetović (yellow card) 70' | Stadium: Başakşehir Fatih Terim Stadium; Referee: Mete Kalkavan |

| 18 March 2023 26 | Beşiktaş | 3–1 | İstanbulspor | Istanbul |
| 19:00 TRT (UTC+3) | Tosun 42'; Aboubakar 56'; Redmond 90+3' | Report | Aksu (yellow card) 45+2'; Lokilo 70'; Duhaney (yellow card) 77' | Stadium: Vodafone Park; Referee: Ali Şansalan |

| 2 April 2023 27 | Fenerbahçe | 2–4 | Beşiktaş | Istanbul |
| 20:30 TRT (UTC+3) | Akaydin (yellow card) 30'; Yandaş (yellow card) 37'; Valencia 41' (pen.) (penalty missed) 53'; Osayi-Samuel (yellow card) 45+7'; Kahveci 90+5' | Report | Welinton (yellow card) 28' (yellow-red card) 51'; Aboubakar (yellow card) 30' (goal) 90+1'; Colley (yellow card) 45+2'; Tosun 58', 62'; Maxim (yellow card) 75'; Redmond 75' | Stadium: Şükrü Saracoğlu Stadium; Referee: Halil Umut Meler |

| 9 April 2023 28 | Beşiktaş | 3–1 | Giresunspor | Istanbul |
| 20:30 TRT (UTC+3) | Aboubakar 39' (pen.), 45+5'; Hadžiahmetović (yellow card) 49'; Redmond 54'; Masuaku (yellow card) 57' | Report | Bajić 21'; Pérez (yellow card) 37'; Kuwas (yellow card) 45+2'; Sainz (yellow card) 67'; Berişbek (yellow card) 90' | Stadium: Vodafone Park; Referee: Arilla Karaoglan |

| 16 April 2023 29 | Trabzonspor | 0–0 | Beşiktaş | Trabzon |
| 20:30 TRT (UTC+3) | Larsen (yellow card) 28'; Bakasetas (yellow card) 74'; Elmalı (yellow card) 86'; Gbamin (yellow card) 90+4' | Report | Saïss (yellow card) 42'; Bulut (yellow card) 61' | Stadium: Şenol Güneş Sports Complex; Referee: Volkan Bayarslan |

| 19 April 2023 30 | Beşiktaş | 3–0 (w/o) | Hatayspor | Istanbul |
| TRT (UTC+3) | | Report | | Stadium: Vodafone Park |

| 22 April 2023 31 | Ümraniyespor | 0–2 | Beşiktaş | Istanbul |
| 19:00 TRT (UTC+3) | | Report | Redmond 25'; Hadžiahmetović (yellow card) 46'; Aboubakar 71', (yellow card) 85' | Stadium: Ümraniye Municipality City Stadium; Referee: Cihan Aydın |

| 30 April 2023 32 | Beşiktaş | 3–1 | Galatasaray | Istanbul |
| 19:00 TRT (UTC+3) | Saïss 35', (yellow card) 67'; Hadžiahmetović 58'; Masuaku (yellow card) 70'; Rosier (yellow card) 70'; Uçan (yellow card) 75'; Aboubakar 90+3', (yellow card) 90+4'; Colley (yellow card) 90+7' | Report | Icardi 20'; Rashica (yellow card) 45+3'; Yılmaz (yellow card) 72' | Stadium: Vodafone Park; Referee: Ali Şansalan |

| 6 May 2023 33 | Antalyaspor | 1–3 | Beşiktaş | Antalya |
| 19:00 TRT (UTC+3) | Fernando (yellow card) 22'; Toprak 32'; Balcı (red card) 82' | Report | Aboubakar 54', 89'; Tosun 84' | Stadium: Antalya Stadium; Referee: Mete Kalkavan |

| 34 | Beşiktaş | 3–0 (w/o) | Gaziantep | Istanbul |
| | | Report | | Stadium: Vodafone Park |

| 21 May 2023 35 | Adana Demirspor | 1–4 | Beşiktaş | Adana |
| 19:00 TRT (UTC+3) | Belhanda 19' (yellow card) 20'; Akintola (yellow card) 48'; Rodrigues (yellow card) 72'; Özbir (yellow card) 90+4' | Report | Fernandes (yellow card) 23' (goal) 46'; Aboubakar 45+4', 90+5' (pen.); Uçan (yellow card) 48'; Rosier (yellow card) 52'; Colley (yellow card) 53'; Tosun 72' (pen.); Hadžiahmetović (yellow card) 81' | Stadium: New Adana Stadium; Referee: Mustafa Kürşad Filiz |

| 36 | Bye |

| 3 June 2023 37 | Kasımpaşa | 2–5 | Beşiktaş | Istanbul |
| 19:00 TRT (UTC+3) | Hajradinović (yellow card) 45+1'; Kara 62'; Donk 86'; Djilobodji (yellow card) 90+11' | Report | Welinton (yellow card) 11'; Fernandes 20'; Tosun 29'; Aboubakar 49'; Bingöl 79'; Masuaku (yellow card) 83'; Vardar (yellow card) 90+2'; Hutchinson 90+13' (pen.) | Stadium: Recep Tayyip Erdoğan Stadium; Referee: Volkan Bayarslan |

| 7 June 2023 38 | Beşiktaş | 3–3 | Konyaspor | Istanbul |
| 20:00 TRT (UTC+3) | Fernandes 6'; Muleka 41'; Bingöl 62'; Kılıçsoy (yellow card) 90+5' | Report | Ülgün 45+2', (yellow card) 61' (yellow-red card) 65'; Emreli 47'; Pozuelo 50'; Moreno (yellow card) 68' | Stadium: Vodafone Park; Referee: Ümit Öztürk |

=== Turkish Cup ===
| 9 November 2022 Fourth round | Beşiktaş | 3–1 | Serik Belediyespor | Istanbul |
| 21:00 TRT (UTC+3) | Redmond 5'; Muleka 9'; Alli 34'; Montero (yellow card) 37' | Report | F.Arikan (yellow card) 51'; H.Kavaklidere 66' | Stadium: Vodafone Park; Referee: Turgut Doman |

| 21 December 2022 Fifth round | Beşiktaş | 4–2 | Şanlıurfaspor | Istanbul |
| 21:00 TRT (UTC+3) | Uzunhan (yellow card) 56'; Tosun 67', 69'; N'Koudou 73'; Weghorst 85' | Report | Rüzgar 9', 15'; M.Yiğit (yellow card) 61' | Stadium: Vodafone Park; Referee: Burak Pakkan |

| 18 January 2023 Round of 16 | MKE Ankaragücü | 1–1 (a.e.t.) (4–3 p) | Beşiktaş | Ankara |
| 17:45 TRT (UTC+3) | Sowe 12'; Marlon (yellow card) 40' | Report | Muleka (yellow card) 61'; Tosun 77' | Stadium: Eryaman Stadium; Referee: Sarper Baris Saka |
| | Penalties |
| | Ciğerci (penalty scored); Sowe (penalty scored); Xavier (penalty scored); Pedrinho (penalty scored) | | (penalty scored) Saiss; (penalty missed) Hutchinson; (penalty scored) Kesgin; (penalty scored) Redmond; (penalty missed) Masuaku |

== Squad statistics ==
As of match played 7 June 2023

=== Appearances and goals ===
| No. | Pos | Nat | Player | Total | | Süper Lig | | Turkish Cup | |
| No. | Pos | Nat | Player | Apps | Goals | Apps | Goals | Apps | Goals |
|---|---|---|---|---|---|---|---|---|---|
| 1 | GK | (Turkey) TUR | Ersin Destanoğlu | 11 | 0 | 9 | 0 | 2 | 0 |
| 2 | DF | (France) FRA | Valentin Rosier | 29 | 1 | 26+1 | 1 | 2 | 0 |
| 3 | DF | (Turkey) TUR | Tayyip Sanuç | 22 | 2 | 19+1 | 2 | 1+1 | 0 |
| 4 | DF | (Turkey) TUR | Onur Bulut | 9 | 0 | 6+2 | 0 | 1 | 0 |
| 6 | DF | (The Gambia) GAM | Omar Colley | 10 | 0 | 10 | 0 | 0 | 0 |
| 7 | MF | (Cameroon) CMR | Georges-Kévin Nkoudou | 22 | 5 | 13+7 | 4 | 1+1 | 1 |
| 8 | MF | (Turkey) TUR | Salih Uçan | 32 | 3 | 28+1 | 3 | 2+1 | 0 |
| 9 | FW | (Turkey) TUR | Cenk Tosun | 34 | 18 | 22+10 | 15 | 1+1 | 3 |
| 10 | FW | (Cameroon) CMR | Vincent Aboubakar | 16 | 13 | 15+1 | 13 | 0 | 0 |
| 11 | MF | (England) ENG | Dele Alli | 15 | 3 | 10+3 | 2 | 2 | 1 |
| 13 | MF | (Canada) CAN | Atiba Hutchinson | 8 | 1 | 1+4 | 1 | 2+1 | 0 |
| 15 | MF | (England) ENG | Nathan Redmond | 28 | 6 | 15+10 | 5 | 2+1 | 1 |
| 17 | MF | (Turkey) TUR | Kerem Kesgin | 8 | 0 | 0+6 | 0 | 1+1 | 0 |
| 18 | MF | (Algeria) ALG | Rachid Ghezzal | 11 | 2 | 7+4 | 2 | 0 | 0 |
| 19 | MF | (Bosnia and Herzegovina) BIH | Amir Hadžiahmetović | 12 | 1 | 12 | 1 | 0 | 0 |
| 20 | MF | (Turkey) TUR | Necip Uysal | 24 | 0 | 8+13 | 0 | 2+1 | 0 |
| 22 | MF | (Turkey) TUR | Berkay Vardar | 5 | 0 | 3+2 | 0 | 0 | 0 |
| 23 | DF | (Brazil) BRA | Welinton | 15 | 0 | 10+4 | 0 | 1 | 0 |
| 25 | DF | (Democratic Republic of the Congo) COD | Arthur Masuaku | 32 | 2 | 30+1 | 2 | 0+1 | 0 |
| 26 | DF | (Morocco) MAR | Romain Saïss | 26 | 1 | 21+4 | 1 | 1 | 0 |
| 34 | GK | (Turkey) TUR | Mert Günok | 24 | 0 | 23 | 0 | 1 | 0 |
| 35 | FW | (Turkey) TUR | Semih Kılıçsoy | 4 | 0 | 0+4 | 0 | 0 | 0 |
| 40 | FW | (Democratic Republic of the Congo) COD | Jackson Muleka | 32 | 6 | 14+15 | 5 | 3 | 1 |
| 44 | MF | (Romania) ROU | Alexandru Maxim | 11 | 0 | 2+9 | 0 | 0 | 0 |
| 77 | DF | (Turkey) TUR | Umut Meraş | 18 | 0 | 4+11 | 0 | 2+1 | 0 |
| 83 | MF | (Portugal) POR | Gedson Fernandes | 35 | 3 | 28+4 | 3 | 1+2 | 0 |
| 88 | MF | (Turkey) TUR | Tayfur Bingöl | 30 | 2 | 7+20 | 2 | 2+1 | 0 |
| 99 | GK | (Turkey) TUR | Emre Bilgin | 2 | 0 | 2 | 0 | 0 | 0 |
Players out on loan:
| 4 | DF | (Spain) ESP | Javi Montero | 4 | 0 | 2+1 | 0 | 1 | 0 |
| 14 | DF | (Turkey) TUR | Emrecan Uzunhan | 6 | 0 | 1+2 | 0 | 2+1 | 0 |
| 33 | FW | (Turkey) TUR | Oğuzhan Akgün | 1 | 0 | 0 | 0 | 1 | 0 |
Players who left Beşiktaş during the season:
| 5 | MF | (Brazil) BRA | Souza | 10 | 1 | 9+1 | 1 | 0 | 0 |
| 10 | FW | (Netherlands) NED | Wout Weghorst | 18 | 9 | 16 | 8 | 0+2 | 1 |
| 30 | FW | (United States) USA | Tyler Boyd | 1 | 0 | 0+1 | 0 | 0 | 0 |

=== Goal scorers ===
| Place | Position | Nation | Number | Name | Süper Lig | Turkish Cup | Total |
|---|---|---|---|---|---|---|---|
| 1 | FW | (Turkey) | 9 | Cenk Tosun | 15 | 3 | 18 |
| 2 | FW | (Cameroon) | 10 | Vincent Aboubakar | 13 | 0 | 13 |
| 3 | FW | (Netherlands) | 10 | Wout Weghorst | 8 | 1 | 9 |
| 4 | MF | (England) | 15 | Nathan Redmond | 5 | 1 | 6 |
| 4 | FW | (Democratic Republic of the Congo) | 40 | Jackson Muleka | 5 | 1 | 6 |
| 6 | MF | (Cameroon) | 7 | Georges-Kévin Nkoudou | 4 | 1 | 5 |
| 7 | MF | (Turkey) | 8 | Salih Uçan | 3 | 0 | 3 |
| 7 | MF | (Portugal) | 83 | Gedson Fernandes | 3 | 0 | 3 |
| 7 | MF | (England) | 11 | Dele Alli | 2 | 1 | 3 |
| 10 | FW | (Algeria) | 18 | Rachid Ghezzal | 2 | 0 | 2 |
| 10 | DF | (Turkey) | 3 | Tayyip Sanuç | 2 | 0 | 2 |
| 10 | DF | (Democratic Republic of the Congo) | 25 | Arthur Masuaku | 2 | 0 | 2 |
| 10 | MF | (Turkey) | 88 | Tayfur Bingöl | 2 | 0 | 2 |
| 14 | DF | (France) | 2 | Valentin Rosier | 1 | 0 | 1 |
| 14 | MF | (Brazil) | 5 | Souza | 1 | 0 | 1 |
| 14 | DF | (Morocco) | 26 | Romain Saïss | 1 | 0 | 1 |
| 14 | MF | (Bosnia and Herzegovina) | 19 | Amir Hadžiahmetović | 1 | 0 | 1 |
| 14 | MF | (Bosnia and Herzegovina) | 13 | Atiba Hutchinson | 1 | 0 | 1 |
| 14 | | | | Own goal | 1 | 0 | 1 |
| | | | | Awarded | 6 | 0 | 6 |
| | | | | TOTALS | 78 | 8 | 86 |

=== Clean sheets ===
| Place | Position | Nation | Number | Name | Süper Lig | Turkish Cup | Total |
|---|---|---|---|---|---|---|---|
| 1 | GK | (Turkey) | 34 | Mert Günok | 7 | 0 | 7 |
| 2 | GK | (Turkey) | 1 | Ersin Destanoğlu | 3 | 0 | 3 |
| | | | | TOTALS | 10 | 0 | 10 |

=== Disciplinary record ===
| Number | Nation | Position | Name | Süper Lig | | Turkish Cup | | Total | |
| Number | Nation | Position | Name | Yellow card | Red card | Yellow card | Red card | Yellow card | Red card |
| 2 | (France) | DF | Valentin Rosier | 6 | 1 | 0 | 0 | 6 | 1 |
| 3 | (Turkey) | DF | Tayyip Sanuç | 1 | 0 | 0 | 0 | 1 | 0 |
| 4 | (Turkey) | DF | Onur Bulut | 1 | 0 | 0 | 0 | 1 | 0 |
| 6 | (The Gambia) | DF | Omar Colley | 4 | 0 | 0 | 0 | 4 | 0 |
| 7 | (Cameroon) | MF | Georges-Kévin Nkoudou | 2 | 0 | 0 | 0 | 2 | 0 |
| 8 | (Turkey) | MF | Salih Uçan | 6 | 0 | 0 | 0 | 6 | 0 |
| 9 | (Turkey) | FW | Cenk Tosun | 5 | 1 | 0 | 0 | 5 | 1 |
| 10 | (Cameroon) | FW | Vincent Aboubakar | 3 | 0 | 0 | 0 | 3 | 0 |
| 15 | (England) | MF | Nathan Redmond | 5 | 0 | 0 | 0 | 5 | 0 |
| 18 | (Algeria) | FW | Rachid Ghezzal | 1 | 0 | 0 | 0 | 1 | 0 |
| 19 | (Bosnia and Herzegovina) | MF | Amir Hadžiahmetović | 4 | 0 | 0 | 0 | 4 | 0 |
| 20 | (Turkey) | MF | Necip Uysal | 2 | 0 | 0 | 0 | 2 | 0 |
| 22 | (Turkey) | MF | Berkay Vardar | 2 | 0 | 0 | 0 | 2 | 0 |
| 23 | (Brazil) | DF | Welinton | 7 | 1 | 0 | 0 | 7 | 1 |
| 25 | (Democratic Republic of the Congo) | DF | Arthur Masuaku | 8 | 0 | 0 | 0 | 8 | 0 |
| 26 | (Morocco) | DF | Romain Saïss | 6 | 0 | 0 | 0 | 6 | 0 |
| 35 | (Turkey) | FW | Semih Kılıçsoy | 1 | 0 | 0 | 0 | 1 | 0 |
| 40 | (Democratic Republic of the Congo) | FW | Jackson Muleka | 2 | 0 | 1 | 0 | 3 | 0 |
| 44 | (Romania) | MF | Alexandru Maxim | 1 | 0 | 0 | 0 | 1 | 0 |
| 83 | (Portugal) | MF | Gedson Fernandes | 6 | 0 | 0 | 0 | 6 | 0 |
| 88 | (Turkey) | MF | Tayfur Bingöl | 1 | 0 | 0 | 0 | 1 | 0 |
Players away on loan:
| 4 | (Spain) | DF | Javi Montero | 0 | 0 | 1 | 0 | 1 | 0 |
| 14 | (Turkey) | DF | Emrecan Uzunhan | 2 | 1 | 1 | 0 | 3 | 1 |
Players who left Beşiktaş during the season:
| 5 | (Brazil) | MF | Souza | 3 | 1 | 0 | 0 | 3 | 1 |
| 10 | (Netherlands) | FW | Wout Weghorst | 2 | 0 | 0 | 0 | 2 | 0 |
| | | | TOTALS | '81 | 5 | 3 | 0 | 84 | 5 |
