= Omar Colley =

Gambian footballer

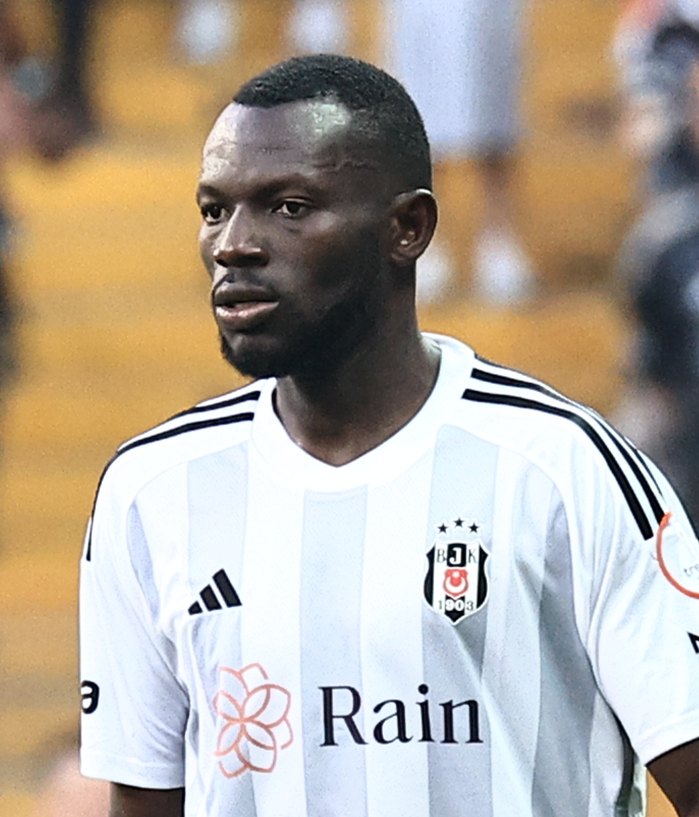
- Colley with Beşiktaş in 2023

Personal information
- Full name: Omar Colley Daniel
- Date of birth: 24 October 1992 (age 34)
- Place of birth: Lamin, The Gambia
- Height: 1.91 m (6 ft 3 in)
- Position: Centre-back

Team information
- Current team: Al-Fayha
- Number: 25

Youth career
- Jattas

Senior career*
Years	Team	Apps	(Gls)
2010–2011	Wallidan	15	(0)
2012	Real de Banjul	17	(1)
2013–2014	KuPS	57	(5)
2015–2016	Djurgårdens IF	44	(5)
2016–2018	Genk	54	(3)
2018–2023	Sampdoria	129	(3)
2023–2024	Beşiktaş	34	(7)
2024–2025	PAOK	8	(0)
2025–2026	Al-Diriyah	33	(3)
2026–	Al-Fayha	1	(0)

International career^{‡}
2009	Gambia U17	8	(2)
2011	Gambia U20	10	(0)
2012–	Gambia	69	(4)
- * Club domestic league appearances and goals as of 12 September 2026 ‡ National team caps and goals as of 17 November 2026

Omar Colley (born 24 October 1992) is a Gambian professional footballer who plays as a centre-back for Saudi Pro League club Al-Fayha and captains the Gambia national team.

== Club career ==
=== Gambian clubs ===
Colley started out playing youth football with Wallidan FC who are a part of his home country's top flight GFA League First Division. After he started playing for the first team he trialed with Major League Soccer club Sporting Kansas City on two occasions in 2010 and 2011. The Americans wanted to sign Colley but refused to pay any form of transfer fee or training compensation to his Gambian club. Wallidans founder called their offer "out of touch with modern football" and "an insult to the local clubs" so Colley instead moved to Real de Banjul where he helped the team become Gambian champions in 2012.

=== KuPS ===
In January 2013, he signed a two-year contract with Kuopion Palloseura (KuPS) in Finnish Veikkausliiga. During the time between his two seasons in Finland he trialed with a couple of 2. Bundesliga clubs and Arminia Bielefeld made an offer to buy Colley. An agreement was not reached however as they could not agree on the transfer fee. As his contract with the Finnish club was nearing the end Colley was described as "perhaps our best foreign signing ever" by the KuPS club president.

=== Djurgårdens IF and Genk ===
In August 2014, Colley signed a three-year contract with Swedish side Djurgårdens IF, starting the first of January 2015. He played his debut game for the club on 22 February 2015 against Ängelholms FF in the Swedish Cup. On 12 August 2016, Colley travelled to Belgium to complete a medical with top-tier club K.R.C. Genk and by doing that Colley missed the training session ahead of the match versus IF Elfsborg which was against the will of Djurgården. Later that day the Director of Sport of Djurgården Bo Andersson told the football site Fotbollskanalen.se that Djurgården were prepared to take the case to FIFA due to the fact that Genk without the permission and knowledge of Djurgården booked a flight and hotel for Colley which violated the contract between Colley and Djurgården. Andersson stated that Djurgården would refuse to sell Colley to Genk after that incident. On 14 August, Colley started the match against IF Elfsborg on the bench due to the recent event. The following day Colley was sold to Genk despite the promise not to sell Colley to Genk. The transfer sum was reported by the Swedish newspaper Expressen to be €2 million and a resale clause which would make Colley the third most expensive defender ever sold by an Allsvenskan team after former Djurgården player Daniel Amartey and IF Elfsborg player Jon Jönsson.

=== Sampdoria ===
On 19 June 2018, he signed for Italian club Sampdoria.

=== Beşiktaş ===
On 9 February 2023, Turkish club Beşiktaş announced the signing of Colley to a contract until the end of the 2024–25 season, with a conditional one-year extension option based on performance. The transfer fee announced was 2.3 million euros.

=== Al-Diriyah ===
On 23 July 2025, Colley joined Saudi First Division League club Al-Diriyah.

== International career ==
Colley was part of the Gambia national under-17 football team that won the 2009 African U-17 Championship as well as the Gambia national under-20 football team that played in the 2011 African Youth Championship. In 2012, he made his debut for the senior Gambia national team in a friendly game against Angola. He played in the 2021 Africa cup of Nations, his national team's first continental tournament, where they made a sensational quarter-final.

== Career statistics ==
=== Club ===
As of 10 April 2025

Appearances and goals by club, season and competition
Club	Season	League			Cup (Note: Includes Suomen Cup, Svenska Cupen, Belgian Cup, Coppa Italia, Turkish Cup)		Other (Note: Includes Finnish League Cup and Turkish Super Cup)		Continental		Total	
Club	Season	Division	Apps	Goals	Apps	Goals	Apps	Goals	Apps	Goals	Apps	Goals
Wallidan	2011	GFA League First Division	15	0	–		–		–		15	0
Real de Banjul	2012	GFA League First Division	17	1	–		–		–		17	1
KuPS	2013	Veikkausliiga	26	2	4	0	8	1	–		38	3
KuPS	2014	Veikkausliiga	32	4	2	0	2	0	–		36	4
KuPS	Total		58	6	6	0	10	1	0	0	74	7
Djurgården	2015	Allsvenskan	27	3	3	0	–		–		30	3
Djurgården	2016	Allsvenskan	17	2	3	0	–		–		20	2
Djurgården	Total		44	5	6	0	0	0	0	0	50	5
Genk	2016–17	Belgian First Division A	35	3	4	0	–		13 (Note: Appearances in UEFA Europa League)	1	52	4
Genk	2017–18	Belgian First Division A	38	1	5	0	–		–		43	1
Genk	Total		73	4	9	0	0	0	13	1	95	5
Sampdoria	2018–19	Serie A	21	0	2	0	–		–		23	0
Sampdoria	2019–20	Serie A	31	0	1	0	–		–		32	0
Sampdoria	2020–21	Serie A	29	2	1	0	–		–		30	2
Sampdoria	2021–22	Serie A	32	0	1	0	–		–		33	0
Sampdoria	2022–23	Serie A	16	1	2	0	–		–		18	1
Sampdoria	Total		129	3	7	0	0	0	0	0	136	3
Beşiktaş	2022–23	Süper Lig	10	0	–		–		–		10	0
Beşiktaş	2023–24	Süper Lig	22	7	3	0	–		8 (Note: Appearances in UEFA Conference League)	1	33	8
Beşiktaş	2024–25	Süper Lig	2	0	1	0	–		–		3	0
Beşiktaş	Total		34	7	4	0	0	0	8	1	46	8
PAOK	2024–25	Super League Greece	8	0	0	0	–		5	0	13	0
Career total			378	26	32	0	10	1	26	2	446	29

=== International ===
As of match played 17 November 2026

Appearances and goals by national team and year
National team	Year	Apps	Goals
Gambia	2012	1	0
Gambia	2013	5	0
Gambia	2015	2	0
Gambia	2016	3	0
Gambia	2017	2	0
Gambia	2018	1	0
Gambia	2019	8	0
Gambia	2020	3	0
Gambia	2021	7	0
Gambia	2022	10	0
Gambia	2023	6	1
Gambia	2024	10	0
Gambia	2025	5	0
Gambia	2026	6	3
Total		69	4

As of match played 29 September 2026. Gambia score listed first, score column indicates score after each Colley goal.

List of international goals scored by Omar Colley
No.	Date	Venue	Opponent	Score	Result	Competition
1	28 March 2023	Stade Mohammed V, Casablanca, Morocco	Mali	1–0	1–0	2023 Africa Cup of Nations qualification
2	31 March 2026	Diamniadio Olympic Stadium, Diamniadio, Senegal	Senegal	1–2	1–3	Friendly
3	29 May 2026	Mardan Sports Complex, Antalya, Turkey	Iran	1–0	1–3	Friendly
4	29 September 2026	Accra Sports Stadium, Accra, Ghana	Ghana	2–2	4–2	2027 Africa Cup of Nations qualification

== Honours ==
Beşiktaş

- Turkish Cup: 2023–24
- Turkish Super Cup: 2024

Gambia U17

- African U-17 Championship: 2009
