= Emirhan Delibaş =

Turkish footballer (born 2003)

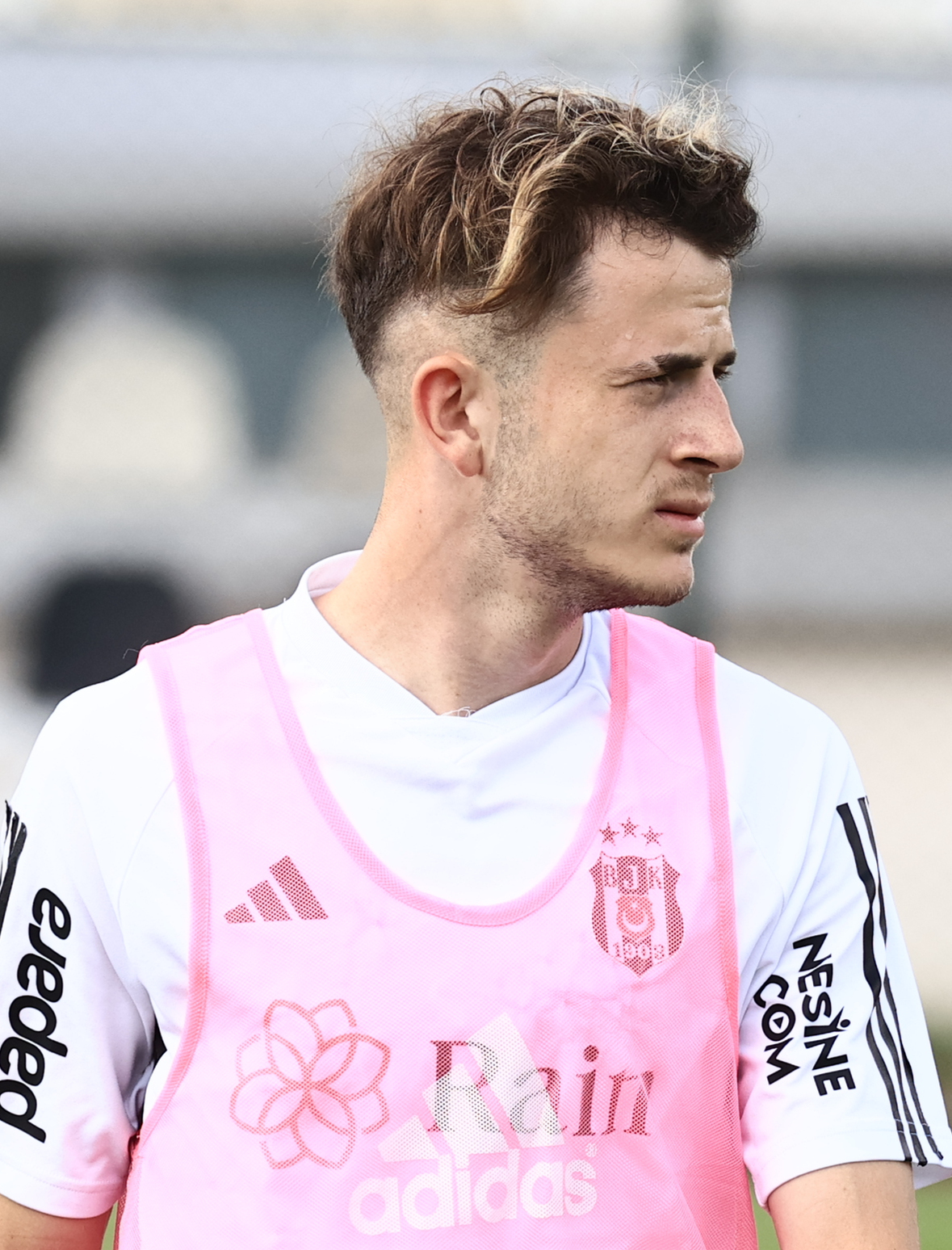
- Delibaş in 2023

Personal information
- Date of birth: 1 January 2003 (age 23)
- Place of birth: Sarıyer, Turkey
- Height: 1.80 m (5 ft 11 in)
- Position: Midfielder

Youth career
- 2013–2021: Beşiktaş

Senior career*
Years	Team	Apps	(Gls)
2021–2024	Beşiktaş	1	(0)
2022–2023	→ Göztepe (loan)	2	(1)
2024	Fatih Karagümrük	1	(0)

International career^{‡}
2019	Turkey U17	3	(0)
2022	Turkey U19	2	(0)
- * Club domestic league appearances and goals as of 27 August 2024 ‡ National team caps and goals as of 24 August 2022

Emirhan Delibaş (born 1 January 2003) is a Turkish professional footballer who most recently played as a midfielder for Fatih Karagümrük.

== Club career ==
=== Beşiktaş ===
Delibaş, who was trained at Beşiktaş Football Academy, became a phenomenon in the social media with his goal against Sporting CP in 2015. Arda Turan, whom Emirhan Delibaş said "I want to meet the most", shared Emirhan's goal on his social media account by saying "Mashallah". Daily Mirror, which published Emirhan's goal on its website, had the headline "Turkish Cristiano Ronaldo".

Delibaş, who was at the squad before the 2022–23 season, played in friendly match against Werder Bremen. He scored one goal and assisted Oğuzhan Akgün in the goal that brought the victory. Delibaş, who was played in the pre-season camp, was included in the team squad by technical director Valérien Ismaël. On 8 September 2022, he was loaned out to fellow Turkish club Göztepe, along with his teammate Ajdin Hasić.

On 14 December 2023, he made his senior debut for Beşiktaş as a late substitute in a 2–0 away win against Lugano in the Conference League. On 5 January 2024, he featured in his first Süper Lig match against Kasımpaşa. A month later, on 19 February, Beşiktaş announced that they parted ways with Delibaş by mutual agreement. According to several other reports the club and Delibaş parted ways as a result of a conflicting age on a dating profile supposedly belonging to him.

On 18 December 2024, Delibaş was banned from playing for four years after failing a doping test.

== International career ==
Delibaş played in the Turkey national under-19 football team.
