= Semih Kılıçsoy =

Turkish footballer

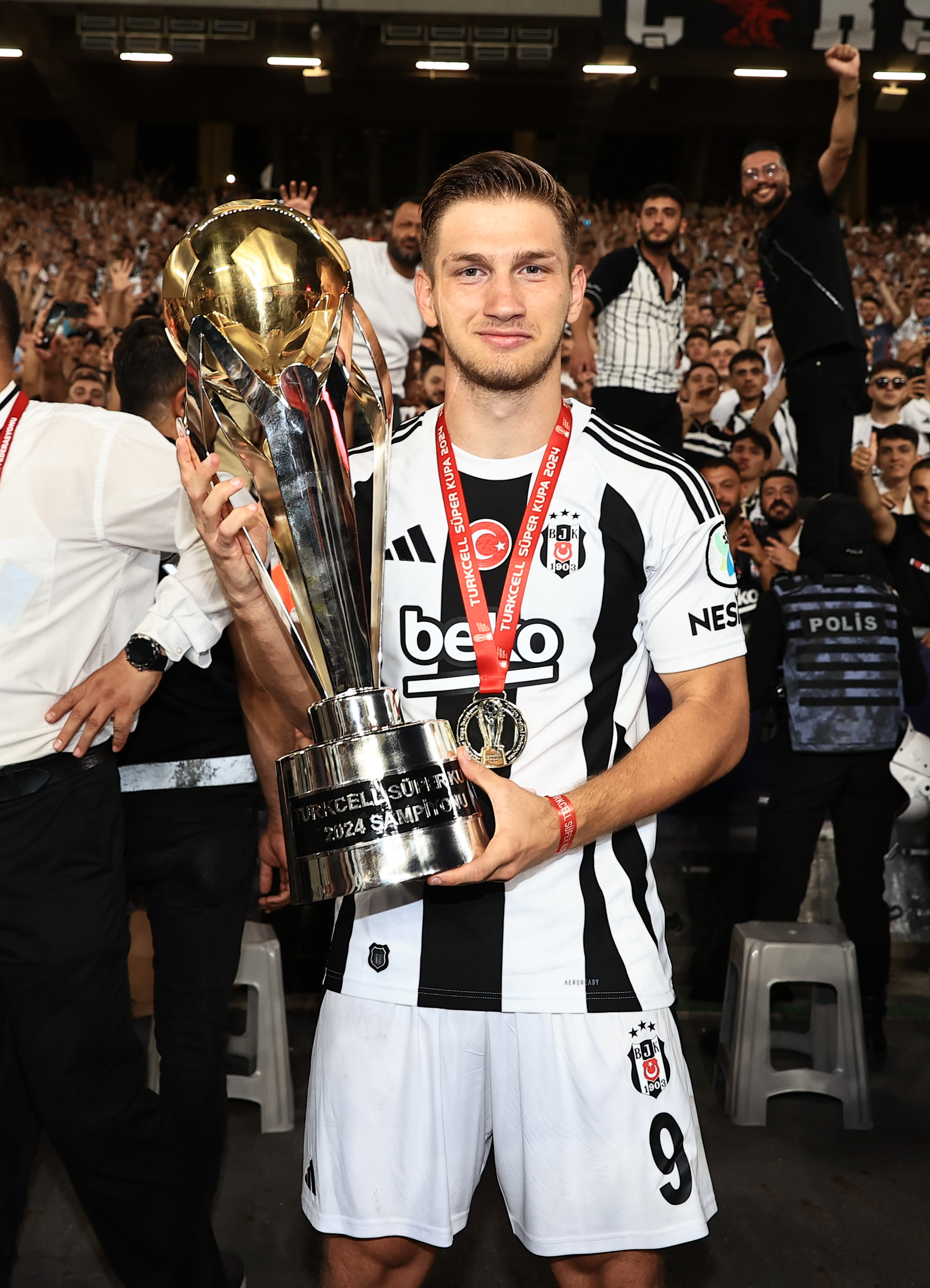
- Kılıçsoy lifting the Turkish Super Cup with Beşiktaş in 2024

Personal information
- Full name: Semih Kılıçsoy
- Date of birth: 15 August 2005 (age 21)
- Place of birth: Gaziosmanpaşa, Turkey
- Height: 1.78 m (5 ft 10 in)
- Position: Forward

Team information
- Current team: Beşiktaş
- Number: 90

Youth career
- 2014–2015: Gop Venüs
- 2015–2016: Arnavutköy Yaylaspor
- 2016–2023: Beşiktaş

Senior career*
Years	Team	Apps	(Gls)
2023–	Beşiktaş	61	(14)
2025–2026	→ Cagliari (loan)	22	(4)

International career^{‡}
2019	Turkey U14	2	(2)
2019	Turkey U15	6	(5)
2021–2022	Turkey U17	13	(9)
2022–2023	Turkey U19	6	(5)
2024–	Turkey U21	12	(6)
2024–	Turkey	4	(0)
- * Club domestic league appearances and goals as of 21:53, 8 November 2026 (UTC) ‡ National team caps and goals as of 15 November 2025

Semih Kılıçsoy (born 15 August 2005) is a Turkish professional footballer who plays as a forward for Süper Lig club Beşiktaş and the Turkey national team.

== Club career ==
Kılıçsoy is a youth product of GOP Venüs and Arnavutköy Yaylaspor, before moving to Beşiktaş in 2016. On 21 October 2021, he signed his first professional contract with the club until 2023. He was a prolific goalscorer with their youth sides and reserves. On 23 December 2022, he extended his contract until 2025. He debuted with Beşiktaş as a substitute in a 0–0 Süper Lig tie with Antalyaspor on 26 February 2023. On 27 July, he scored his first professional goal against KF Tirana.

In January 2024, he signed a new four-year contract with Beşiktaş.

On 3 August 2025, Kılıçsoy was loaned to Cagliari until the end of the season with an option to buy.

== International career ==
Kılıçsoy is a youth international for Turkey, has represented Turkey at every youth international stage.

On 24 May 2024, Kılıçsoy was selected in the Turkish national team's preliminary 35-man squad for the UEFA Euro 2024. He made his debut for the senior national team on 4 June in a friendly against Italy prior to the tournament. On 7 June, he was named in the final 26-man squad.

== Style of play ==
Kılıçsoy was described by Mehmet Ekşi as a "dynamic and talented" striker, he can also play as a winger or attacking midfielder. He can use both feet well. His idol is Sergio Agüero.

== Career statistics ==
=== Club ===
As of match played 20 August 2026

Appearances and goals by club, season and competition
Club	Season	League			National cup (Note: Includes Turkish Cup, Coppa Italia)		Europe		Other		Total	
Club	Season	Division	Apps	Goals	Apps	Goals	Apps	Goals	Apps	Goals	Apps	Goals
Beşiktaş	2022–23	Süper Lig	4	0	0	0	—		—		4	0
Beşiktaş	2023–24	Süper Lig	23	11	5	0	7 (Note: Appearances in UEFA Europa Conference League)	1	—		35	12
Beşiktaş	2024–25	Süper Lig	32	3	4	0	9 (Note: 8 appearances in UEFA Europa League and 1 appearance in Europa League qualifying)	1	1 (Note: Appearance in Turkish Super Cup)	0	46	4
Beşiktaş	2025–26	Süper Lig	0	0	0	0	2 (Note: Appearances in UEFA Europa League qualifying)	0	—		2	0
Beşiktaş	2026–27	Süper Lig	1	0	0	0	2	1	—		3	1
Beşiktaş	Beşiktaş total		60	14	9	0	20	3	1	0	90	17
Cagliari (loan)	2025–26	Serie A	14	4	3	0	—		—		17	4
Career total			74	18	12	0	20	3	1	0	107	21

=== International ===
As of 19 November 2024

Appearances and goals by national team and year
National team	Year	Apps	Goals
Turkey
Turkey	2024	4	0
Total		4	0

== Honours ==
Beşiktaş

- Turkish Cup: 2023–24
- Turkish Super Cup: 2024

Individual

- Serie A Goal of the Month: December 2025
