= Emrecan Terzi =

Turkish footballer (born 2004)

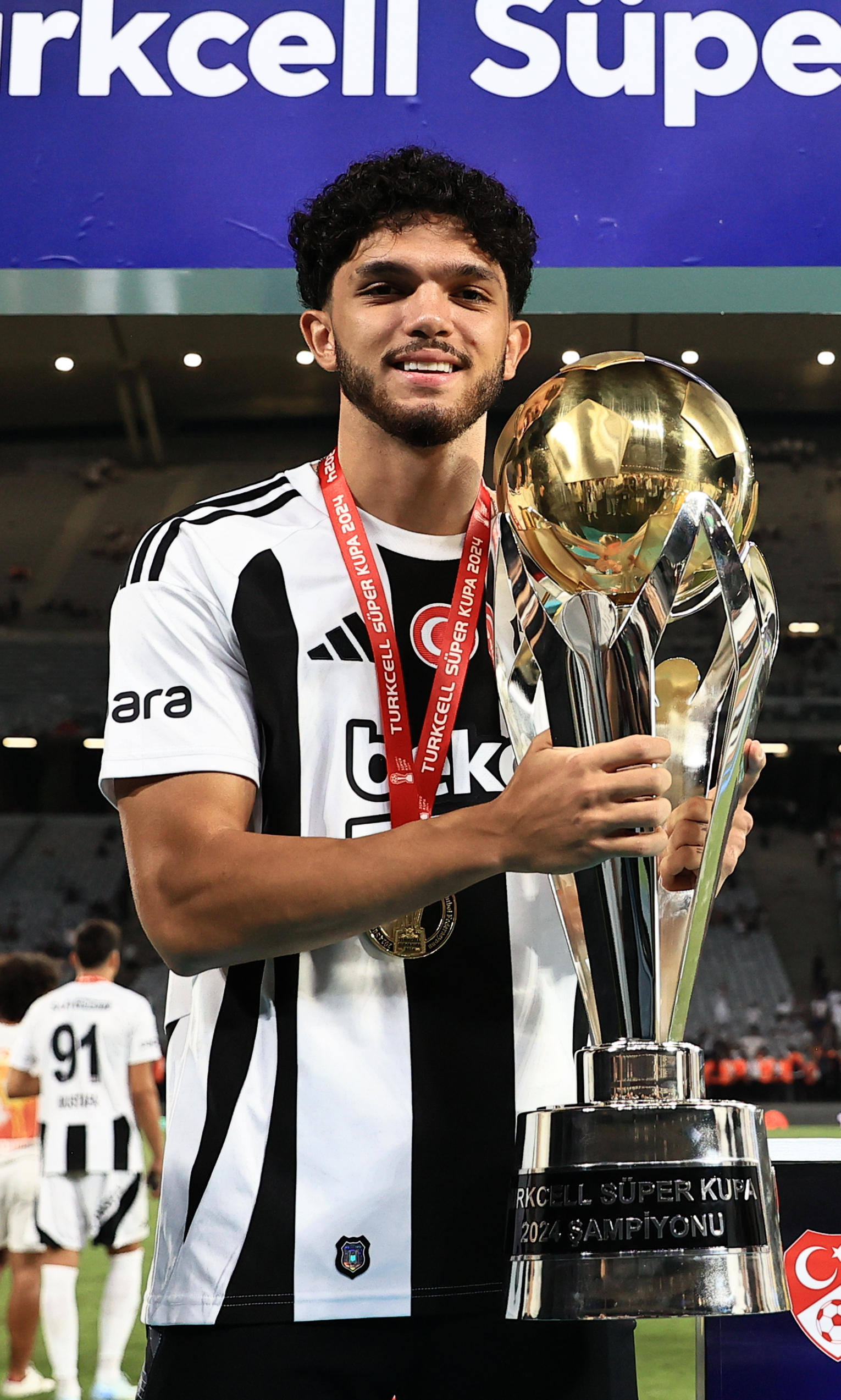
- Terzi with the 2024 Turkish Super Cup

Personal information
- Full name: Serkan Emrecan Terzi
- Date of birth: 5 January 2004 (age 22)
- Place of birth: Bağcılar, Turkey
- Height: 1.80 m (5 ft 11 in)
- Position: Left-back

Team information
- Current team: Iğdır
- Number: 3

Youth career
- 2014–2017: Altinova Belediyespor
- 2017–2022: Beşiktaş

Senior career*
Years	Team	Apps	(Gls)
2022–2026	Beşiktaş	15	(0)
2023	→ Karacabey Belediyespor (loan)	4	(0)
2025–2026	→ Serikspor (loan)	17	(2)
2026	→ Sakaryaspor (loan)	8	(0)
2026–	Iğdır	0	(0)

International career^{‡}
2021	Turkey U18	4	(0)
2024–2025	Turkey U21	5	(0)
- * Club domestic league appearances and goals as of 24 October 2026 ‡ National team caps and goals as of 22:53, 5 June 2025 (UTC)

Serkan Emrecan Terzi (born 5 January 2004) is a Turkish professional footballer who plays as a left-back for TFF 1. Lig club Iğdır.

== Club career ==
Terzi is a youth product of Altinova Belediyespor and Beşiktaş. On 18 March 2022, he signed his first professional contract with Beşiktaş.

Terzi, who was discovered in the U14 match played between Altınova Belediyespor-Nilüfer Belediyespor by Caner Kaya, who served as Beşiktaş Chief Scout at that time was brought to Beşiktaş in the interim transfer period of the 2016-17 season. Then Beşiktaş Chief Scout Kaya realized the transfer of Terzi with the Altınova Belediyespor president Doğan Albayrak in exchange for a Beşiktaş tracksuit.

On 12 January 2023, he moved to Karacabey Belediyespor on loan in the TFF Second League where he began his senior career. He made his professional debut with Beşiktaş in a 2–0 UEFA Europa Conference League win over Lugano on 14 December 2023, scoring his side's second goal.

On 24 August 2025, Terzi was loaned to TFF First League club Serik Belediyespor until the end of the season.

On 2 February 2026, Terzi was loaned to TFF First League club Sakaryaspor until the end of the season.

== International career ==
Terzi is a youth international for Turkey, having played for the Turkey U18s in 2021.

== Personal life ==
Terzi's father died the day after naming his child after getting hit by a bus at work.

== Honours ==
Beşiktaş

- Turkish Cup: 2023–24
- Turkish Super Cup: 2024
