= Emrecan Bulut =

Turkish footballer

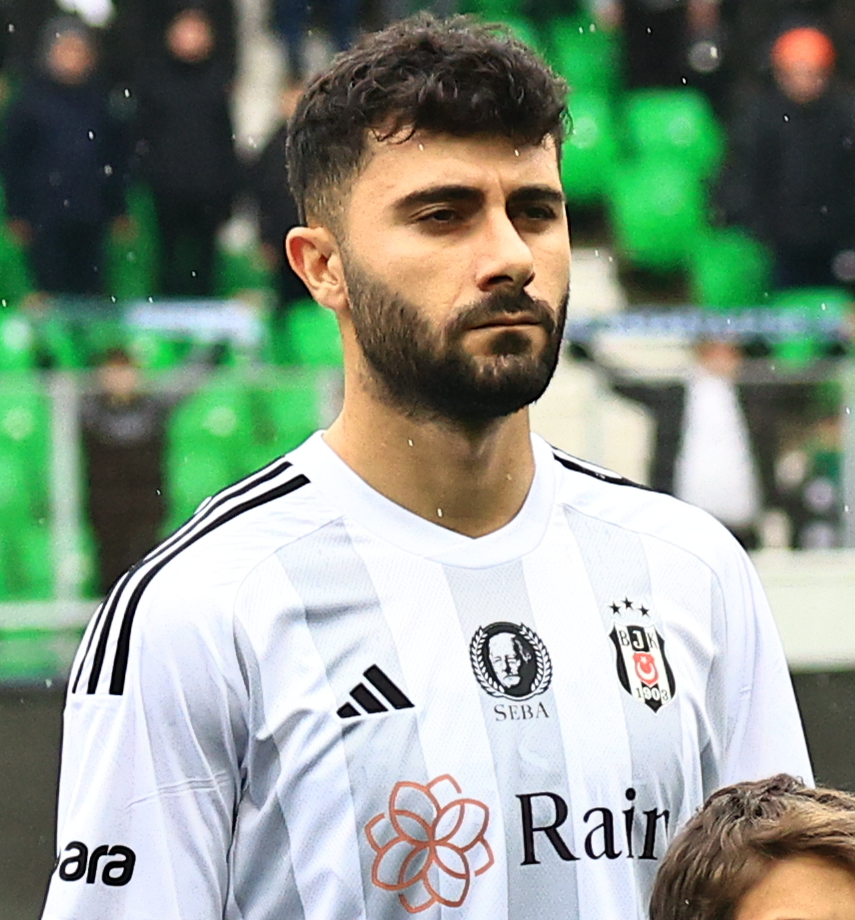

Personal information
- Full name: Emrecan Bulut
- Date of birth: 26 November 2002 (age 23)
- Place of birth: Ardahan, Turkey
- Height: 1.85 m (6 ft 1 in)
- Position: Winger

Team information
- Current team: Çaykur Rizespor
- Number: 99

Youth career
- 2015–2019: Yunus Emre Belediye Spor
- 2021: Karaköy Spor FK

Senior career*
Years	Team	Apps	(Gls)
2022-2023	Somaspor	33	(15)
2023–2024	Beşiktaş	0	(0)
2024	→ Ümraniyespor (loan)	13	(2)
2024–	Çaykur Rizespor	42	(4)
- * Club domestic league appearances and goals as of 29 August 2026

Emrecan Bulut (born 26 November 2002) is a Turkish professional footballer who plays as a winger for Turkish Süper Lig club Çaykur Rizespor.

== Career ==
Originally from Ardahan, Emrecan Bulut started playing football for Yunusemre Belediyespor in 2015 in Manisa, where he came with his family. Emrecan, who played football in the amateur cluster for a long time, had to quit football when the COVID-19 pandemic started and he started working as a worker in a factory. Emrecan, who spent 2020–21 years away from football, returned to the pitch with the amateur league team Karaköy Spor after this period, where he weighed up to 90 kilograms.

Then, on 23 September 2021, Bulut transferred to Karaköyspor, an amateur team, and started to lose the weight he gained, and on 19 July 2022 he transferred to the 2nd League team Somaspor where he scored 16 goals and provided 1 assist in 34 matches in all competitions.

On 1 July 2023, Bulut signed a five-year deal with Süper Lig club Beşiktaş.

On 5 February 2024, Bulut was loaned to TFF First League club Ümraniyespor until the end of the season

On 13 July 2024, Bulut was loaned to Süper Lig club Çaykur Rizespor until the end of the season
