= Berkay Vardar =

Turkish footballer (born 2003)

Personal information
- Date of birth: 14 January 2003 (age 23)
- Place of birth: Istanbul, Turkey
- Height: 1.88 m (6 ft 2 in)
- Position: Defensive midfielder

Youth career
- 2016–2021: Beşiktaş

Senior career*
Years	Team	Apps	(Gls)
2021–2024	Beşiktaş	5	(0)
2023–2024	→ Sheriff Tiraspol (loan)	6	(0)
2024	Fatih Karagümrük	1	(0)

International career^{‡}
2019	Azerbaijan U17	3	(1)
2021	Azerbaijan U19	3	(1)
2022	Turkey U21	1	(0)
- * Club domestic league appearances and goals as of 27 August 2024 ‡ National team caps and goals as of 21 November 2022

Berkay Vardar (14 January 2003) is a Turkish professional footballer who most recently played for Fatih Karagümrük.

== Career ==
Vardar made his senior debut in match week 2 of Group C at 2021–22 UEFA Champions League, against Ajax as a substitute player, replacing Umut Meraş in the 73rd minute, with the match ending 2–0 for Ajax, on 28 September 2021. On 22 April 2022, Vardar signed his first professional contract with Beşiktaş until 2025.

On 11 August 2023 Vardar was loaned to Moldovan Super Liga club Sheriff Tiraspol until the end of the season

On 18 December 2024, Vardar was banned from playing for four years after failing a doping test.

== International career ==
Vardar was born in Istanbul, Turkey to an Albanian father from Kumanovo and Azerbaijani mother. He was eligible to represent three countries on international level, either Azerbaijan, North Macedonia or Turkey. From 2019, until 2021, Vardar has been part of Azerbaijan at youth international level, respectively has been part of the U17 and U19 teams and he with these teams played six matches and scored two goals. On 16 September 2022, he received a call-up from Turkey U21 for the friendly match against Georgia U21, and made his debut after coming on as a substitute at 46th minute in place of Ömer Faruk Beyaz.

== Statistics ==
=== Club ===
As of 24 August 2022

Appearances and goals by club, season and competition
Club	Season	League			Cup (Note: Includes Turkish Cup)		Continental (Note: Includes UEFA Champions League)		Other (Note: Includes Turkish Super Cup)		Total	
Club	Season	Division	Apps	Goals	Apps	Goals	Apps	Goals	Apps	Goals	Apps	Goals
Beşiktaş	2021–22	Süper Lig	0	0	0	0	1	0	0	0	1	0
Beşiktaş	2022–23	Süper Lig	2	0	0	0	0	0	0	0	2	0
Beşiktaş	Total		2	0	0	0	1	0	0	0	3	0
Career total			2	0	0	0	1	0	0	0	3	0
