= Emrecan Uzunhan =

Turkish footballer

Personal information
- Date of birth: 26 February 2001 (age 25)
- Place of birth: Istanbul, Turkey
- Height: 1.89 m (6 ft 2 in)
- Position: Defender

Team information
- Current team: İstanbulspor

Youth career
- 2012–2014: Galatasaray
- 2014–2020: İstanbulspor

Senior career*
| Years | Team | Apps | (Gls) |
| 2020–2022 | İstanbulspor | 23 | (1) |
| 2022–2026 | Beşiktaş | 4 | (0) |
| 2023 | → Antalyaspor (loan) | 12 | (0) |
| 2024–2025 | → Antalyaspor (loan) | 8 | (0) |
| 2025–2026 | → İstanbulspor (loan) | 26 | (1) |
| 2026– | İstanbulspor | 0 | (0) |
- * Club domestic league appearances and goals as of 4 September 2026

Emrecan Uzunhan (born 26 February 2001) is a Turkish professional footballer who plays as a defender for the TFF First League club İstanbulspor.

== Career ==
On 19 July 2022, Uzunhan signed a five-year deal with Süper Lig club Beşiktaş.

== Honours ==
Beşiktaş

- Turkish Cup: 2023–24
- Turkish Super Cup: 2024
