= Tayfur Bingöl =

Turkish footballer

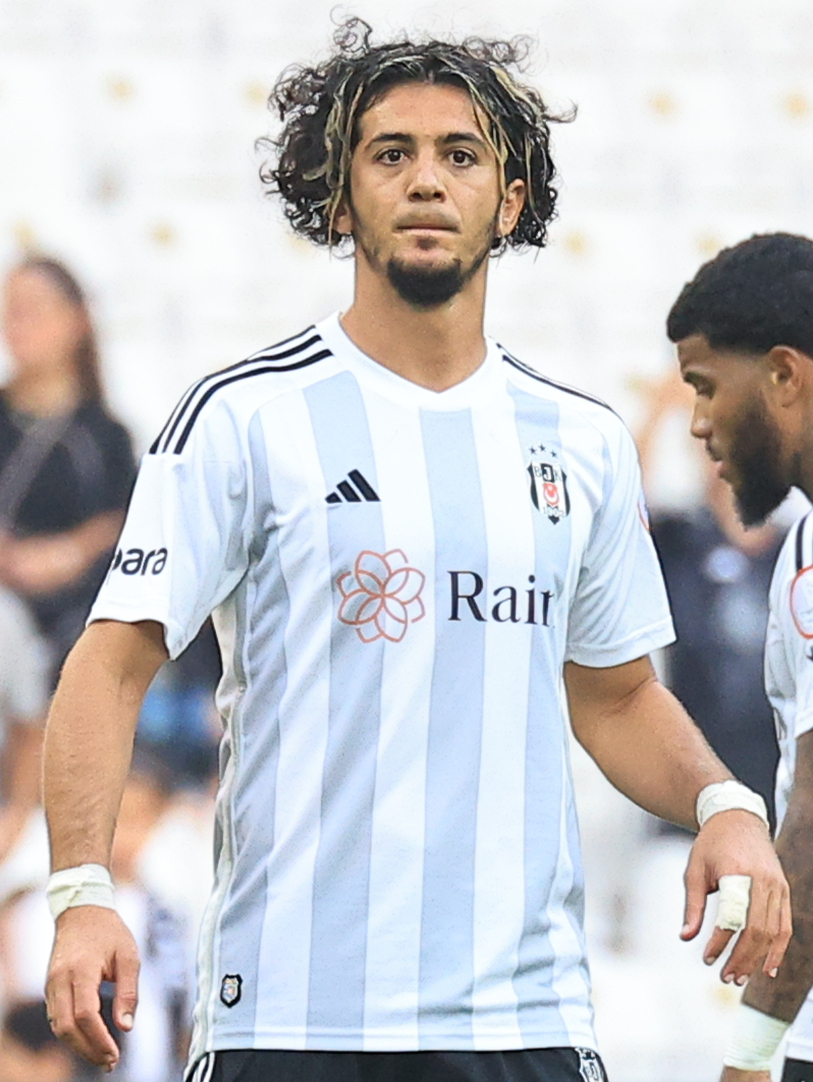
- Bingöl in 2023

Personal information
- Full name: Tayfur Bingöl
- Date of birth: 11 January 1993 (age 33)
- Place of birth: Ankara, Turkey
- Height: 1.84 m (6 ft 0 in)
- Position: Right-back

Team information
- Current team: Kocaelispor
- Number: 75

Youth career
- 2003–2008: Gençlerbirliği
- 2008–2010: Hacettepe
- 2010–2011: Gençlerbirliği

Senior career*
| Years | Team | Apps | (Gls) |
| 2011–2012 | Hacettepe | 31 | (5) |
| 2012–2016 | Gençlerbirliği | 1 | (0) |
| 2013 | → Hacettepe (loan) | 14 | (3) |
| 2013–2014 | → Bandırmaspor (loan) | 32 | (13) |
| 2014–2015 | → Adana Demirspor (loan) | 27 | (1) |
| 2015–2016 | → Alanyaspor (loan) | 33 | (12) |
| 2016–2019 | Göztepe | 79 | (11) |
| 2019–2023 | Alanyaspor | 63 | (4) |
| 2020 | → Bursaspor (loan) | 16 | (3) |
| 2022–2023 | → Beşiktaş (loan) | 26 | (2) |
| 2023–2025 | Beşiktaş | 12 | (0) |
| 2024–2025 | → Eyüpspor (loan) | 29 | (5) |
| 2025– | Kocaelispor | 30 | (5) |

International career^{‡}
| 2012 | Turkey U20 | 3 | (0) |
| 2012 | Turkey U21 | 1 | (0) |
- * Club domestic league appearances and goals as of 10 June 2026 ‡ National team caps and goals as of 22:39, 11 May 2021 (UTC)

Tayfur Bingöl (born 11 January 1993) is a Turkish professional footballer who plays as a right-back for Kocaelispor.

== Club career ==
Bingöl spent his youth development between the youth academies of Gençlerbirliği and Hacettepe, before formally joining the senior team of Haceteppe in the 2011–12 season. In 2012, he returned to Gençlerbirliği and made his professional debut with the Turkish Süper Lig in a 5–3 loss to Antalyaspor on 20 January 2013. He went on a series of developmental loans with Haceteppe, Bandırmaspor, Adana Demirspor, and Alanyaspor before transferring to Göztepe in 2016. After establishing himself as a starter there, he earned a moved to Alanyaspor, returning to the top division in Turkey.

On 4 February 2022, Bingöl signed a new contract with Alanyaspor. At the signing ceremony, he showed his intention to transfer to his boyhood club Beşiktaş in the future by stating that: "My dream is to transfer to Beşiktaş. If this dream does not come true, I want to retire from football at Alanyaspor".

On 8 September 2022, Bingöl was loaned to fellow Süper Lig club Beşiktaş until the end of the season

On 2 September 2023, Bingöl completed a permanent transfer to Beşiktaş. He signed a three-year contract. The fee was reported by some sources to be in the region of £1million

On 30 July 2024, Bingöl was loaned to Eyüpspor until the end of the season

On 22 August 2025, Bingöl completed a permanent transfer to Kocaelispor.

== International career ==
Bingöl is a youth international for Turkey, and has represented the Turkey U20s and U21s.

== Honours ==
Beşiktaş

- Türkiye Kupası: 2023–24
