= Tayyip Talha Sanuç =

Turkish footballer (born 1999)

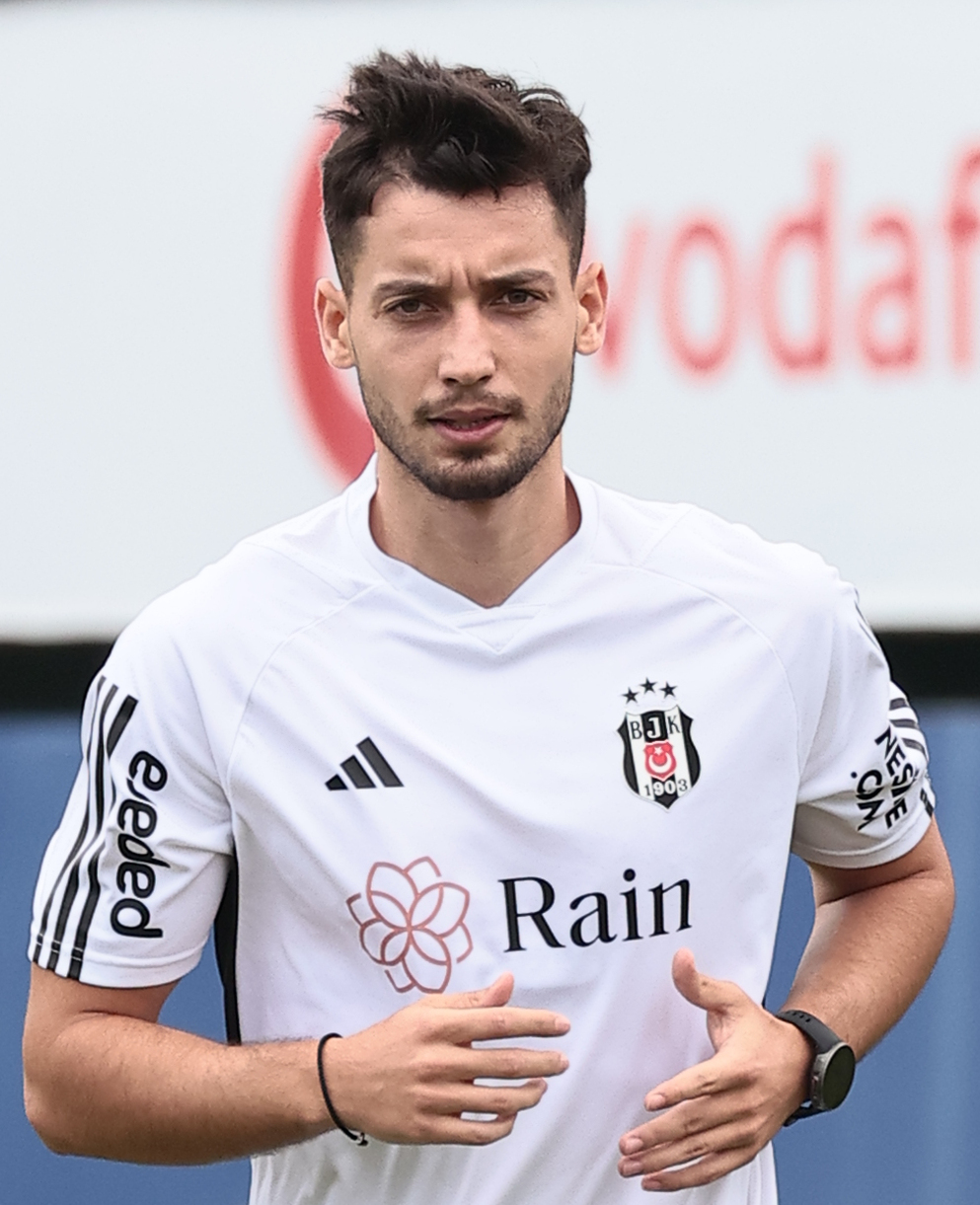
- Sanuç with Beşiktaş in 2023

Personal information
- Date of birth: 17 December 1999 (age 26)
- Place of birth: Karabük, Turkey
- Height: 1.88 m (6 ft 2 in)
- Position: Defender

Team information
- Current team: Çaykur Rizespor
- Number: 5

Youth career
- 2010–2017: Karabükspor

Senior career*
Years	Team	Apps	(Gls)
2017–2018	Karabükspor	12	(0)
2018–2022	Adana Demirspor	62	(5)
2022–2026	Beşiktaş	44	(2)
2025–2026	→ Gaziantep (loan)	18	(0)
2026–	Çaykur Rizespor	4	(0)

International career^{‡}
2016–2017	Turkey U18	4	(0)
2018	Turkey U19	2	(0)
2022	Turkey U23	3	(1)
2022–	Turkey	1	(0)
Medal record
Men's football
Representing Turkey
Islamic Solidarity Games
Gold medal – first place	2021 Konya
- * Club domestic league appearances and goals as of 16 October 2026 ‡ National team caps and goals as of 21:49, 19 November 2022 (UTC)

Tayyip Talha Sanuç (born 17 December 1999) is a Turkish professional footballer who plays as a defender for Süper Lig club Çaykur Rizespor.

== Professional career ==
Sanuç is a youth product of Karabükspor, and was promoted to their first team in 2017. He made his professional debut for Karabükspor in a 3-2 Süper Lig victory over Akhisar Belediyespor on 2 June 2017 at the age of 17. On 17 July 2018, he was transferred to Adana Demirspor.

On 9 September 2022, Sanuç signed for fellow Süper Lig club Beşiktaş on a four-year contract.

In April 2024, he signed a new three-year contract with Beşiktaş.

On 7 September 2025, Sanuç was loaned to Gaziantep until the end of the season.

== International career ==
Sanuç is a youth international for Turkey, having played up to the Turkey U23s. He debuted with the senior Turkey national team in a friendly 2–1 win over the Czech Republic on 19 November 2022.

== Honours ==
Adana Demirspor

- TFF 1. Lig: 2020–21

Beşiktaş

- Turkish Cup: 2023–24
- Turkish Super Cup: 2024

Turkey U23

- Islamic Solidarity Games: 2021
