= Ahmet Gülay =

Turkish footballer (born 2003)

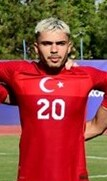
- Gülay in 2022

Personal information
- Full name: Ahmet Gülay
- Date of birth: 13 January 2003 (age 23)
- Place of birth: Trabzon, Turkey
- Height: 1.74 m (5 ft 9 in)
- Position: Left back

Team information
- Current team: Balıkesirspor
- Number: 3

Youth career
- 2013–2014: Avcılar Belediye
- 2014–2020: Beşiktaş

Senior career*
Years	Team	Apps	(Gls)
2020–2024	Beşiktaş	0	(0)
2020–2023	→ Alanyaspor (loan)	10	(0)
2023–2024	→ Aliağa FK (loan)	3	(0)
2024	→ Alanya Kestelspor (loan)	10	(0)
2024–	Balıkesirspor	48	(0)

International career
2017–2018	Turkey U15	10	(0)
2018–2019	Turkey U16	15	(0)
2019	Turkey U17	13	(0)
2022	Turkey U19	6	(0)
2022	Turkey U23	4	(0)
Medal record
Men's football
Representing Turkey
Islamic Solidarity Games
Gold medal – first place	2021 Konya
- * Club domestic league appearances and goals as of 12 April 2026

Ahmet Gülay (born 13 January 2003) is a Turkish professional footballer who plays as a left back for Balıkesirspor.

== Professional career ==
A youth product ofAvcılar Belediye and Beşiktaş, Gülay signed a professional contract with Beşiktaş in the summer of 2020. Shortly after, on 26 August 2020, Gülay joined Alanyaspor on a 2-year loan from Beşiktaş. Gülay made his professional debut with Alanyaspor in a 6-0 Süper Lig win over Hatayspor on 4 October 2020.

== International career ==
Gülay represented the Turkey U23s in their winning campaign at the 2021 Islamic Solidarity Games.

== Honours ==
Turkey U23

- Islamic Solidarity Games: 2021
