= Umut Meraş =

Turkish football player

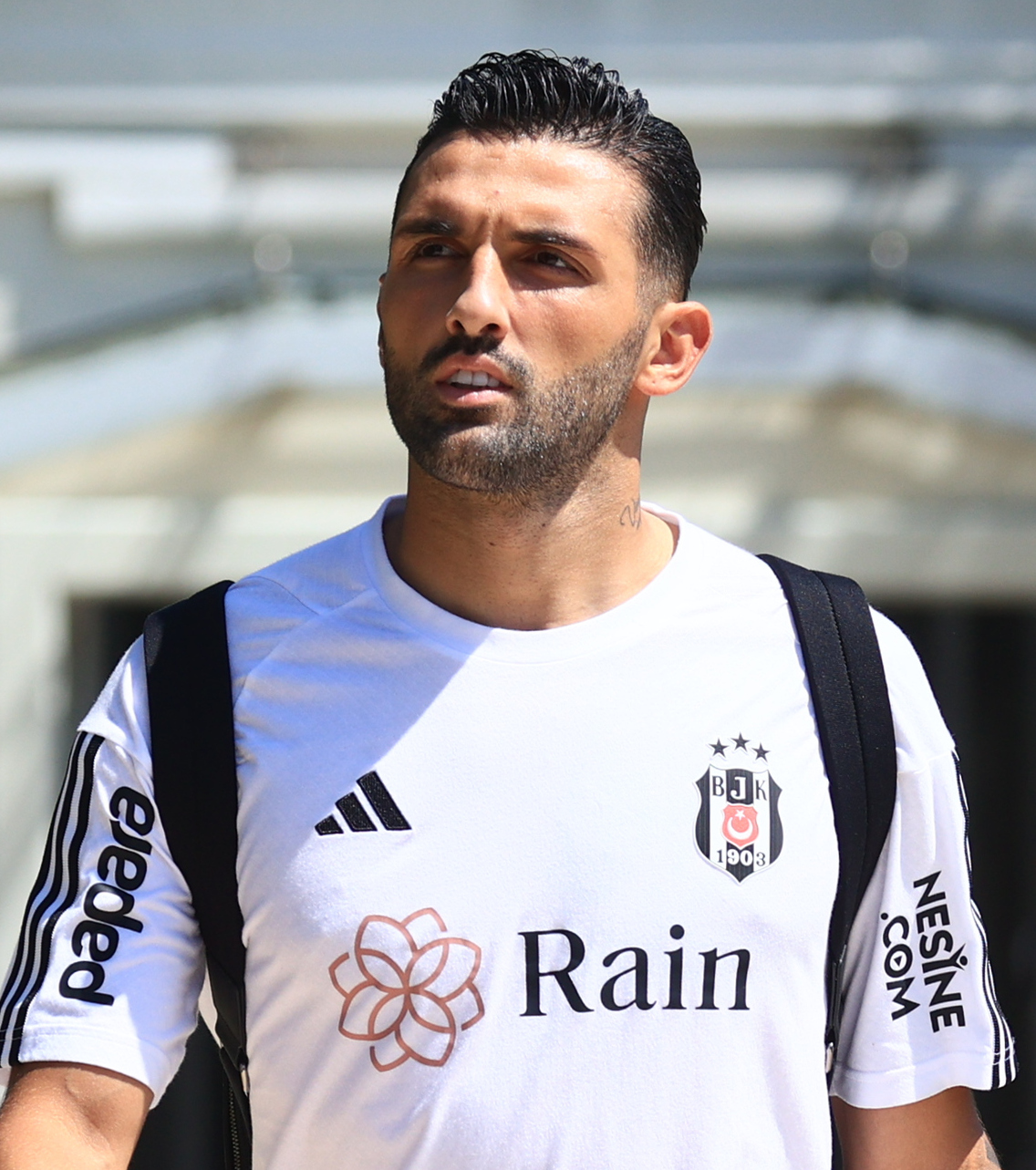
- Meraş with Beşiktaş in 2023

Personal information
- Full name: Cengiz Umut Meraş
- Date of birth: 20 December 1995 (age 30)
- Place of birth: Eminönü, Istanbul, Turkey
- Height: 1.78 m (5 ft 10 in)
- Position: Left-back

Team information
- Current team: Amedspor
- Number: 17

Youth career
- 2008–2011: Şehremini
- 2011–2012: Sarıyer
- 2012–2013: Yeşilköy
- 2013–2014: Boluspor

Senior career*
Years	Team	Apps	(Gls)
2014–2018	Boluspor	79	(2)
2018–2019	Bursaspor	27	(2)
2019–2021	Le Havre	57	(1)
2021–2024	Beşiktaş	44	(0)
2024–2026	Eyüpspor	54	(1)
2026–	Amedspor	7	(0)

International career^{‡}
2019–	Turkey	15	(0)
- * Club domestic league appearances and goals as of 10 October 2026 ‡ National team caps and goals as of 18:17, 26 October 2021 (UTC)

Cengiz Umut Meraş (born 20 December 1995) is a Turkish professional footballer who plays as a left-back for Süper Lig club Amedspor.

== Club career ==
On 31 August 2018, Meraş moved to Bursaspor after a couple successful seasons with Boluspor. The transaction costed a reported amount of TRY2.25m. Meraş made his Süper Lig debut for Bursaspor against İstanbul Başakşehir, ending 0–0, on 21 September 2018.

In August 2019, Meraş joined Ligue 2 side Le Havre AC on a four-year contract and played for two seasons.

In August 2021, Meraş returned to Süper Lig by signing to Beşiktaş.

In July 2024, Meraş joined newly promoted Süper Lig side Eyüpspor on a two-year contract.

== International career ==
Meraş made his debut for the Turkey national team on 30 May 2019, in a friendly against Greece, as a starter.

He was included in the squad for the UEFA Euro 2020.

== Statistics ==
=== International ===
Appearances and goals by national team and year
National team	Year	Apps	Goals
Turkey	2019	6	0
Turkey	2020	3	0
Turkey	2021	6	0
Total		15	0

== Honours ==
Beşiktaş

- Süper Kupa: 2021
- Türkiye Kupası: 2023–24
