= Oğuzhan Akgün =

Turkish footballer (born 2001)

Personal information
- Date of birth: 13 July 2001 (age 25)
- Place of birth: Gebze, Kocaeli, Turkey
- Height: 1.74 m (5 ft 9 in)
- Position: Winger

Team information
- Current team: Küçükçekmece Sinop Spor
- Number: 16

Youth career
- 2013–2018: Beşiktaş

Senior career*
Years	Team	Apps	(Gls)
2018–2024	Beşiktaş	0	(0)
2019–2020	→ İstanbulspor (loan)	6	(0)
2020–2021	→ Altınordu (loan)	9	(1)
2021–2022	→ Ergene Velimeşe (loan)	51	(11)
2023	→ Sakaryaspor (loan)	10	(1)
2023–2024	→ Sarıyer (loan)	16	(6)
2024–2025	Nazilli Belediyespor	16	(6)
2025	Yeni Mersin İdmanyurdu	12	(4)
2025–	Muş SK	14	(2)
2026–	→ Küçükçekmece Sinop Spor (loan)	8	(5)

International career
2015	Turkey U14	3	(0)
2015–2016	Turkey U15	9	(3)
2016–2017	Turkey U16	7	(2)
2017–2018	Turkey U17	12	(1)
2018–2019	Turkey U18	13	(4)
2019	Turkey U19	3	(1)
- * Club domestic league appearances and goals as of 21:15, 12 April 2026 (UTC)

Oğuzhan Akgün (born 13 July 2001) is a Turkish professional footballer who plays as a winger for Küçükçekmece Sinop Spor.
