= 2020–21 Alanyaspor season =

Alanyaspor
2020–21 season
- President: Hasan Çavuşoğlu
- Manager: Çağdaş Atan
- Stadium: Bahçeşehir Okulları Stadium
- Süper Lig: 7th
- Turkish Cup: Semi-finals
- UEFA Europa League: Third qualifying round
- Top goalscorer: League: Davidson (8); All: Khouma Babacar (11)
Home colours	Away colours	Third colours

The 2020–21 season was Alanyaspor's 73rd season in existence and the club's fifth consecutive season in the top flight of Turkish football. In addition to the domestic league, Alanyaspor participated in this season's editions of the Turkish Cup and the UEFA Europa League. The season covered the period from July 2020 to 30 June 2021.

== Players ==
=== First-team squad ===
As of 19 January 2021

Note: Flags indicate national team as defined under FIFA eligibility rules; some limited exceptions apply. Players may hold more than one non-FIFA nationality.

No.	Pos.	Nation	Player
3	DF	TUR	Ahmet Gülay (on loan from Beşiktaş)
4	DF	TUR	Alpay Çelebi (on loan from Beşiktaş)
5	DF	TUR	Fatih Aksoy
6	MF	TUR	Ceyhun Gülselam
7	MF	TUR	Efecan Karaca
8	MF	TUR	Murat Uslu
9	FW	PAR	Adam Bareiro (on loan from Monterrey)
10	FW	SEN	Khouma Babacar (on loan from Sassuolo)
13	GK	TUR	Ahmet Çağrı
14	MF	TUR	Hasan Hüseyin Acar
19	FW	TUR	Mustafa Pektemek
21	DF	SUI	François Moubandje (on loan from Dinamo Zagreb)

No.	Pos.	Nation	Player
22	MF	TUR	Berkan Kutlu
23	MF	GER	Efkan Bekiroğlu
24	DF	ESP	Juanfran
26	MF	GRE	Manolis Siopis
27	MF	TUR	Umut Güneş
28	GK	POR	Marafona
31	DF	GRE	Georgios Tzavellas
44	DF	ENG	Steven Caulker
75	MF	TUR	Tayfur Bingöl
91	FW	BRA	Davidson
92	MF	POL	Damian Kądzior (on loan from Eibar)

=== Out on loan ===
Note: Flags indicate national team as defined under FIFA eligibility rules; some limited exceptions apply. Players may hold more than one non-FIFA nationality.

No.	Pos.	Nation	Player
—	FW	TUR	Veysel Ünal (at Afyonspor)
—	MF	TUR	Emircan Altıntaş (at Adana Demirspor)
—	MF	TUR	Onur Bulut (at Çaykur Rizespor)

No.	Pos.	Nation	Player
—	GK	TUR	İsmail Ünal (at Kestelspor)
—	DF	TUR	Sıddık Çelik (at Malatya Yesilyurt Belediyespor)
—	DF	TUR	Emre Bekir (at Serik Belediyespor)

== Pre-season and friendlies ==
Win Draw Loss

19 August 2020 Friendly	Çaykur Rizespor (Turkey)	0–2	(Turkey) Alanyaspor	Turkey
17:00 TRT (UTC+3)

== Competitions ==
=== Overview ===
Competition	First match	Last match	Starting round	Final position	Record							
Competition	First match	Last match	Starting round	Final position	Pld	W	D	L	GF	GA	GD	Win %
Süper Lig	11 September 2020	15 May 2021	Matchday 1	7th	40	17	9	14	58	45	+13	42.50
Turkish Cup	16 December 2020	17 March 2021	Fifth round	Semi-finals	4	3	0	1	12	6	+6	75.00
UEFA Europa League	24 September 2020		Third qualifying round	Third qualifying round	1	0	0	1	0	1	−1	0.00
Total					45	20	9	16	70	52	+18	44.44

Source: TFF.org

=== Süper Lig ===
==== League table ====
Pos	Team	Pld	W	D	L	GF	GA	GD	Pts	Qualification or relegation
5	Sivasspor	40	16	17	7	54	43	+11	65	Qualification for the Europa Conference League second qualifying round
6	Hatayspor	40	17	10	13	62	53	+9	61	
7	Alanyaspor	40	17	9	14	58	45	+13	60	
8	Fatih Karagümrük	40	16	12	12	64	52	+12	60	
9	Gaziantep	40	15	13	12	59	51	+8	58	

Source: Süper Lig, Soccerway
Rules for classification: 1) Points; 2) Head-to-head points; 3) Head-to-head goal difference; 4) Head-to-head goals scored; 5) Goal difference; 6) Goals scored; 7) Play-off.

==== Results summary ====
Overall								Home						Away					
Pld	W	D	L	GF	GA	GD	Pts	W	D	L	GF	GA	GD	W	D	L	GF	GA	GD
40	17	9	14	58	45	+13	60	12	4	4	42	21	+21	5	5	10	16	24	−8

Last updated: 29 April 2021.
Source: Soccerway

==== Results by round ====
Round	1	2	3	4	5	6	7	8	9	10	11	12	13	14	15	16	17	18	19	20	21	22	23	24	25	26	27	28	29	30	31	32	33	34	35	36	37	38	39	40	41	42
Ground	A	H	A	H	A	H	A	H	A	H	A	H	A	H	A	H	A	H	B	A	H	H	A	H	A	H	A	H	A	H	A	H	A	H	A	H	A	H	A	B	H	A
Result	W	W	D	W	W	W	L	D	W	W	L	W	L	D	L	W	L	L	B	D	W	W	D	W	D	L	L	D	W	W	L	L	L	W	L	W	D	D	L	B	L	W
Position	5	2	2	1	1	1	2	1	1	1	1	1	1	1	3	2	4	5	6	5	5	4	5	5	5	5	6	6	5	5	6	6	6	5	6	5	5					

Source: TFF.org
A = Away; H = Home; B = Bye; W = Win; D = Draw; L = Loss

Note: Since the league has been expanded to 21 teams each team will earn a bye twice this season.

==== Matches ====
12 September 2020 1	Sivasspor	0–2	Alanyaspor	Sivas
18:00	Arslan (yellow card) 36'; Osmanpaşa (yellow card) 50'; Yeşilyurt (yellow card) 74'; Çiftçi (yellow card) 75'	Report	Moubandje (yellow card) 4'; Davidson 21' (yellow card) 74'; Caulker 90'	Stadium: New Sivas 4 Eylül Stadium; Attendance: 0 Referee: Ali Palabıyık

19 September 2020 2	Alanyaspor	2–0	Kayserispor	Alanya
20:00	Bareiro 45+5' 77'; Tzavellas (yellow card) 75'	Report	Acar (yellow card) 54'; Attamah (yellow card) 64'; Demir (yellow card) 89'	Stadium: Bahçeşehir Okulları Stadium; Attendance: 0 Referee: Erkan Özdamar

27 September 2020 3	Çaykur Rizespor	1–1	Alanyaspor	Rize
14:30	Fabrício Baiano (yellow card) 77'; Rémy 81'; Pehlivan (yellow card) 90+4'	Report	Pektemek 69'; Juanfran (yellow card) 90+3'	Stadium: Yeni Rize Şehir Stadium; Attendance: 0 Referee: Fırat Aydınus

4 October 2020 4	Alanyaspor	6–0	Hatayspor	Alanya
17:00	Bakasetas 18'; Davidson 23' 67' 77'; Bareiro 34'; Karaca (yellow card) 36'; Uçan (yellow card) 39'; Moubandje 45+2'	Report	Aabid (yellow card) 40'; Pablo (yellow card) 49'; Akintola (yellow card) 57'	Stadium: Bahçeşehir Okulları Stadium; Attendance: 0 Referee: Atilla Karaoğlan

19 October 2020 5	Galatasaray	1–2	Alanyaspor	Istanbul
21:00	Etebo (yellow card) 30' (yellow-red card) 45+2'; Falcao 34' (pen.); Marcão (yellow card) 42'; Belhanda (yellow card) 67'; Öztürk (yellow card) 83'	Report	Babacar (yellow card) 21' (goal) 43'; Uçan (yellow card) 52'; Siopis (yellow card) 78'; Davidson 90+5'	Stadium: Türk Telekom Stadium; Attendance: 0 Referee: Tugay Numanoğlu

25 October 2020 6	Alanyaspor	2–0	Fatih Karagümrük	Alanya
16:00	Davidson 8'; Uçan (yellow card) 56'; Babacar 81'	Report	Balkovec (yellow card) 23'	Stadium: Bahçeşehir Okulları Stadium; Attendance: 0 Referee: Mete Kalkavan

7 November 2020 8	Alanyaspor	1–1	Trabzonspor	Alanya
16:00	Caulker 49'; Davidson (yellow card) 52'; Kutlu (yellow card) 90+3'	Report	Asan (yellow card) 28'; Vitor Hugo (yellow card) 49'; João Pereira (yellow card) 50'; Caulker 59' (o.g.)	Stadium: Bahçeşehir Okulları Stadium; Attendance: 0 Referee: Ali Palabıyık

22 November 2020 9	Antalyaspor	0–2	Alanyaspor	Antalya
19:00	Naldo (yellow card) 24'; Özmert (yellow card) 46' (yellow-red card) 67'; Bayrakdar (yellow card) 67'; Albayrak (yellow card) 69'	Report	Uçan 55'; Davidson (yellow card) 81'; Kutlu 84'	Stadium: Antalya Stadyumu; Attendance: 0 Referee: Özgür Yankaya

29 November 2020 10	Alanyaspor	1–0	Konyaspor	Alanya
16:00	Moubandje (yellow card) 11'; Babacar 37'; Bakasetas (yellow card) 74'; Aksoy (yellow card) 90+3'	Report	Kravets (yellow card) 14'; Cikalleshi (yellow card) 25'; Uludağ (yellow card) 45+2'; Milošević (yellow card) 75'; Bardakcı (yellow card) 80'	Stadium: Bahçeşehir Okulları Stadium; Attendance: 0 Referee: Bahattin Şimşek

5 December 2020 11	Gençlerbirliği	2–1	Alanyaspor	Ankara
13:30	Özdemir 41'; Polomat (yellow card) 72'; Candeias 75'; Sio (yellow card) 77'; Touré (yellow card) 81'; Kızıldağ (yellow card) 90+4'	Report	Bakasetas (yellow card) 81' (goal) 83' (pen.); Kutlu (yellow card) 85'	Stadium: Eryaman Stadium; Attendance: 0 Referee: Fırat Aydınus

9 December 2020 7	Göztepe	1–0	Alanyaspor	İzmir
18:30	Sönmez (yellow card) 65'; Tripić 70'; Öztürk (yellow card) 72'	Report	Uçan (yellow card) 45'; Siopis (yellow card) 65'; Bareiro (yellow card) 90+11'	Stadium: Gürsel Aksel Stadium; Attendance: 0 Referee: Ali Şansalan

13 December 2020 12	Alanyaspor	2–1	Beşiktaş	Alanya
19:00	Bakasetas 26' (pen.) 79'; Babacar (yellow card) 54' (yellow-red card) 82'; Bingöl (yellow card) 57'; Bekiroğlu (yellow card) 89'; Tzavellas (yellow card) 90+6'	Report	Rosier (yellow card) 34'; Ghezzal (yellow card) 70'; Aboubakar 90' (pen.); Javi Montero (yellow card) 90+6'	Stadium: Bahçeşehir Okulları Stadium; Attendance: 0 Referee: Atilla Karaoğlan

20 December 2020 13	Denizlispor	1–0	Alanyaspor	Denizli
16:00	Rodallega 9'; Fabiano (yellow card) 13'; Niyaz (yellow card) 23'; Mešanović (yellow card) 31'; Sagal (yellow card) 41'; Murawski (yellow card) 51' (yellow-red card) 71'; Sacko (yellow card) 89'; Gönen (yellow card) 90+5'	Report	Bareiro (yellow card) 41'; Bakasetas (yellow card) 51'	Stadium: Denizli Atatürk Stadium; Attendance: 0 Referee: Suat Arslanboğa

23 December 2020 14	Alanyaspor	1–1	Yeni Malatyaspor	Alanya
16:00	Babacar 32'; Bakasetas (yellow card) 59'; Karaca (yellow card) 82'	Report	Büyük 60'; Acquah (yellow card) 65'; Bulut (yellow card) 83'	Stadium: Bahçeşehir Okulları Stadium; Attendance: 0 Referee: Alper Ulusoy
Note: Played Behind Closed Doors

27 December 2020 15	Gaziantep	3–1	Alanyaspor	Gaziantep
13:30	Dicko 9'; Demir 29'; Kana-Biyik (yellow card) 53'; Maxim 60' (yellow card) 70'; Mirallas (yellow card) 69'; Vetrih (yellow card) 79'; André (yellow card) 88'	Report	Davidson 26'; Uçan (yellow card) 36'; Tzavellas (yellow card) 53'; Güneş (yellow card) 71'; Caulker (yellow card) 89'	Stadium: Gaziantep Arena; Attendance: 0 Referee: Yaşar Kemal Uğurlu
Note: Played Behind Closed Doors

2 January 2021 16	Alanyaspor	3–0	İstanbul Başakşehir	Alanya
16:00 TRT (UTC+3)	Bareiro 19'; Moubandje 27'; Bingöl 83'	Report		Stadium: Bahçeşehir Okulları Stadium; Attendance: 0 Referee: Mete Kalkavan

7 January 2021 17	Fenerbahçe	2–1	Alanyaspor	Istanbul
19:00	Mame Thiam (yellow card) 5'; Sinan Gümüş 12' (yellow card) 59'; Harun Tekin (yellow card) 16'; Marcel Tisserand (yellow card) 39'; Dimitrios Pelkas 69'	Report	(yellow card) 14' Davidson; (yellow card) 15' Georgios Tzavellas; (yellow card) 33' Berkan Kutlu; (yellow card) 65' José Marafona; 81' (pen.) Khouma Babacar	Stadium: Şükrü Saracoğlu Stadium; Attendance: 0 Referee: Halil Umut Meler; Assistant referees: Mustafa Emre Eyisoy, İlker Takpak; Fourth official: Direnç Tonusluoğlu

11 January 2021 18	Alanyaspor	1–2	Kasımpaşa	Alanya
19:00	Bakasetas 39' (pen.)	Report	Hodžić 22'; Haddadi (red card) 25'; Erdoğan 33'	Stadium: Bahçeşehir Okulları Stadium; Attendance: 0 Referee: Abdulkadir Bitigen; Fourth official: Burak Pakkan

19	Bye

21 January 2021 20	BB Erzurumspor	1–1	Alanyaspor	Erzurum
16:00	Başsan 31'	Report	Bakasetas 58'; Tzavellas (red card) 90+1'	Stadium: Kazım Karabekir Stadium; Attendance: 0 Referee: Turgut Doman; Fourth official: Abdullah Taşkınsoy

25 January 2021 21	Alanyaspor	4–3	Ankaragücü	Alanya
19:00	Uçan 37'; Bakasetas 54'; Babacar 62'; Moubandje 79'	Report	Paintsil 3', 28'; Aksoy 65' (o.g.)	Stadium: Bahçeşehir Okulları Stadium; Attendance: 0 Referee: Cüneyt Çakιr

31 January 2021 22	Alanyaspor	3–1	Sivasspor	Alanya
16:00 TRT (UTC+3)	Aksoy 14'; Davidson 45+3'; Babacar 60'	Report	Gradel 90' (pen.)	Stadium: Bahçeşehir Okulları Stadium; Attendance: 0 Referee: Zorbay Küçük

3 February 2021 23	Kayserispor	1–1	Alanyaspor	Kayseri
16:00	Henrique (yellow card) 40'; Maglica 54'; Cristian Săpunaru (yellow card) 70' (yellow-red card) 77'; Parlak (yellow card) 77'; Alemdar (yellow card) 77'; Paz (yellow card) 81'	Report	Babacar (yellow card) 45'; Tzavellas 79'	Stadium: Kadir Has Stadium; Attendance: 0 Referee: Atilla Karaoğlan

6 February 2021 24	Alanyaspor	2–1	Çaykur Rizespor	Alanya
16:00 TRT (UTC+3)	Bareiro 32' (pen.); Pektemek 90+6'	Report	Talbi 25'	Stadium: Bahçeşehir Okulları Stadium; Attendance: 0 Referee: Mete Kalkavan

14 February 2021 25	Hatayspor	0–0	Alanyaspor	Antakya
16:00 TRT (UTC+3)		Report		Stadium: Hatay New Stadium; Attendance: 0 Referee: Turgut Doman

20 February 2021 26	Alanyaspor	0–1	Galatasaray	Alanya
19:00 TRT	Babacar (yellow card) 33'; Salih (yellow card) 59'; Tzavellas (yellow card) 65'	Report	Emre Kılınç 18'	Stadium: Bahçeşehir Okulları Stadium; Attendance: 0 Referee: Zorbay Küçük; Assistant referees: Kerem Ersoy, İbrahim Çağlar Uyarcan; Fourth official: Kadir Sağlam

27 February 2021 27	Fatih Karagümrük	2–0	Alanyaspor	Istanbul
16:00	Nado 50'; Borini 88'	Report		Stadium: Atatürk Olympic Stadium; Attendance: 0 Referee: Volkan Bayarslan; Fourth official: Erdoğan Özkaya

4 March 2021 28	Alanyaspor	1–1	Göztepe	Alanya
16:00 TRT (UTC+3)	Tzavellas 54'	Report	Aksoy 43' (o.g.)	Stadium: Bahçeşehir Okulları Stadium; Attendance: 0 Referee: Tugay Kaan Numanoğlu

8 March 2021 29	Trabzonspor	1–3	Alanyaspor	Trabzon
16:00	Bakasetas (yellow card) 69' (goal) 80' (pen.); Sarı (yellow card) 85'; Hugo (yellow card) 90+5'	Report	Pektemek 66'; Davidson 73', 90+7'; Gülselam (yellow card) 78'; Kutlu (yellow card) 79'; Tzavellas (yellow card) 85'	Stadium: Şenol Güneş Stadium; Attendance: 0 Referee: Suat Arslanboğa; Assistant referees: Mehmet Cem Hanoğlu, İlker Takpak; Fourth official: Erkan Özdamar

13 March 2021 30	Alanyaspor	4–0	Antalyaspor	Alanya
16:00 TRT (UTC+3)	Babacar 28' (pen.); Pektemek 39'; Bekiroğlu 83'; Gülselam 90+5'	Report	Orgill (yellow card) 24'; Boffin (yellow card) 28'; Özmert (yellow card) 45'; Bayrakdar (yellow card) 60'; Balcı (yellow card) 65'	Stadium: Bahçeşehir Okulları Stadium; Attendance: 0 Referee: Sarper Barış Saka

21 March 2021 31	Konyaspor	1–0	Alanyaspor	Konya
13:30 TRT (UTC+3)		Report		Stadium: Konya Büyükşehir Stadium; Attendance: 0 Referee: Koray Gençerler

4 April 2021 32	Alanyaspor	1–2	Gençlerbirliği	Alanya
17:00 TRT (UTC+3)		Report		Stadium: Bahçeşehir Okulları Stadium; Attendance: 0 Referee: Ali Şansalan

7 April 2021 33	Beşiktaş	3–0	Alanyaspor	Istanbul
19:00 TRT (UTC+3)	Tosun 11'; Hutchinson (yellow card) 26'; Ghezzal 58'; De Souza (yellow card) 74'; Nkoudou 85'	Report	Uçan (yellow card) 23'; Gülselam (yellow card) 53'	Stadium: Vodafone Park; Attendance: 0 Referee: Ümit Öztürk

12 April 2021 34	Alanyaspor	3–2	Denizlispor	Alanya
19:00 TRT (UTC+3)		Report		Stadium: Bahçeşehir Okulları Stadium; Attendance: 0 Referee: Yasin Kol

17 April 2021 35	Yeni Malatyaspor	1–0	Alanyaspor	Malatya
16:00 TRT (UTC+3)		Report		Stadium: New Malatya Stadium; Attendance: 0 Referee: Atilla Karaoğlan

22 April 2021 36	Alanyaspor	3–2	Gaziantep	Alanya
16:00 TRT (UTC+3)		Report		Stadium: Bahçeşehir Okulları Stadium; Attendance: 0 Referee: Suat Arslanboğa

25 April 2021 37	İstanbul Başakşehir	0–0	Alanyaspor	Istanbul
16:00 TRT (UTC+3)	Višća (yellow card) 38'	Report		Stadium: Başakşehir Fatih Terim Stadium; Attendance: 0 Referee: Özgür Yankaya

29 April 2021 38	Alanyaspor	0–0	Fenerbahçe	Alanya
20:30 TRT (UTC+3)	Tzavellas (yellow card) 49'; Kutlu (yellow card) 71'; Bekiroğlu (yellow card) 76'	Report	Gönül (red card) 43'	Stadium: Bahçeşehir Okulları Stadium; Attendance: 0 Referee: Yaşar Kemal Uğurlu

3 May 2021 39	Kasımpaşa	3–0	Alanyaspor	Istanbul
16:00 TRT (UTC+3)				Stadium: Recep Tayyip Erdoğan Stadium

40	Bye

11 May 2021 41	Alanyaspor	2–3	BB Erzurumspor	Alanya
20:30 TRT (UTC+3)				Stadium: Bahçeşehir Okulları Stadium; Attendance: 0

15 May 2021 42	Ankaragücü	0–1	Alanyaspor	Ankara
18:00 TRT (UTC+3)				Stadium: Eryaman Stadium

=== Turkish Cup ===
16 December 2020 Fifth round	Alanyaspor	5–1	Adanaspor	Alanya
16:00 TRT (UTC+3)	Pektemek 14' 69'; Aksoy 17'; Çelebi (yellow card) 77'; Güneş 86'; Bareiro 90+1'	Report	Roni 25'; Altındağ (yellow card) 70'; Ožegović (yellow card) 71'	Stadium: Bahçeşehir Okulları Stadium; Attendance: 0 Referee: Abdullah Taşkınsoy

13 January 2021 Round of 16	Alanyaspor	4–1	BB Erzurumspor	Alanya
18:45 TRT (UTC+3)	Babacar 14' 57'; Caulker 24'; Davidson 77'; Gülselam (yellow card) 89'	Report	Karakullukçu 7' (yellow card) 30'; Uçar (yellow card) 65'; Mina (yellow card) 89'	Stadium: Bahçeşehir Okulları Stadium; Attendance: 0 Referee: Ramazan Keleş

10 February 2021 Quarter-finals	Galatasaray	2–3	Alanyaspor	Istanbul
20:45 TRT (UTC+3)	Mohamed 83'; Marcão (yellow card) 90+2'; Fernandes 90+4'	Report	Babacar 31', 48' (pen.); Uçan 41'; Pektemek (yellow card) 79'; Siopis (yellow card) 80'; Aksoy (yellow card) 86'	Stadium: Türk Telekom Stadium; Attendance: 0 Referee: Abdulkadir Bitigen

17 March 2021 Semi-finals	Antalyaspor	2–0	Alanyaspor	Antalya
20:45 TRT (UTC+3)	Podolski 18', (yellow card) 35'; Amilton (yellow card) 25'; Albayrak (yellow card) 27'; Bayrakdar (yellow card) 56'; Gürler (yellow card) 56'; Özmert (yellow card) 59', (goal) 82'	Report	Bingöl (yellow card) 25'; Kutlu (yellow card) 32'; Pektemek (yellow card) 71'; Siopis (yellow card) 75'; Bekiroğlu (yellow card) 78'; Tzavellas (yellow card) 79'	Stadium: Antalya Stadium; Attendance: 0 Referee: Mustafa Öğretmenoğlu

=== UEFA Europa League ===
24 September 2020 Third qualifying round	Rosenborg (Norway)	1–0	(Turkey) Alanyaspor	Trondheim, Norway
19:00 CEST (UTC+2)	Reginiussen (yellow card) 19'; Zachariassen (yellow card) 28'; Konradsen 59', (yellow card) 53' (yellow-red card) 66'; Eyjólfsson (yellow card) 63'	Report	Moubandje (yellow card) 57'; Bakasetas (yellow card) 68'; Uçan (yellow card) 76'; Babacar (yellow card) 90+3', (red card) 90+3'	Stadium: Lerkendal Stadion; Attendance: 0 Referee: Kristo Tohver (Estonia)
