= 2019–20 Alanyaspor season =

Alanyaspor
2019–20 season
- Chairman: Hasan Çavuşoğlu
- Manager: Erol Bulut
- Stadium: Bahçeşehir Okulları Stadium
- Süper Lig: 5th
- Turkish Cup: Runners-up
- Top goalscorer: League: Papiss Cissé (22); All: Papiss Cissé (26)
| Home colours | Away colours | Third colours |

The 2019–20 season was Alanyaspor's 72nd year in existence. In addition to the domestic league, Alanyaspor participated in the Turkish Cup. The season covered the period from 1 July 2019 to 29 July 2020.

== Squad ==
As of 3 September 2019

Note: Flags indicate national team as defined under FIFA eligibility rules; some limited exceptions apply. Players may hold more than one non-FIFA nationality.

| No. | Pos. | Nation | Player |
|---|---|---|---|
| 6 | MF | TUR | Ceyhun Gülselam |
| 7 | MF | TUR | Efecan Karaca |
| 8 | MF | TUR | Salih Uçan |
| 9 | FW | SEN | Papiss Cissé |
| 10 | FW | CHI | Júnior Fernándes |
| 11 | FW | GRE | Anastasios Bakasetas |
| 12 | GK | TUR | Cenk Gönen |
| 14 | DF | BRA | Baiano |
| 17 | DF | TUR | Kaan Kanak |
| 19 | FW | TUR | Mustafa Pektemek |
| 21 | DF | COD | Fabrice N'Sakala |
| 23 | DF | BRA | Welinton |
| 24 | DF | ESP | Juanfran |

| No. | Pos. | Nation | Player |
|---|---|---|---|
| 25 | MF | TUR | Onur Bulut |
| 26 | MF | GRE | Manolis Siopis |
| 27 | MF | TUR | Umut Güneş |
| 28 | GK | POR | Marafona |
| 30 | FW | ANG | Djalma |
| 31 | DF | GRE | Giorgos Tzavellas |
| 34 | GK | TUR | Eray Birnican |
| 35 | MF | TUR | Musa Çağıran |
| 44 | DF | ENG | Steven Caulker |
| 53 | DF | TUR | Lokman Gör |
| 77 | MF | TUR | Emircan Altıntaş |
| 97 | GK | TUR | İsmail Ünal |
| 99 | FW | MAR | Yacine Bammou (on loan from SM Caen) |

== Süper Lig ==
=== League table ===
| Pos | Team | Pld | W | D | L | GF | GA | GD | Pts | Qualification or relegation |
|---|---|---|---|---|---|---|---|---|---|---|
| 3 | Beşiktaş | 34 | 19 | 5 | 10 | 59 | 40 | +19 | 62 | Qualification for the Champions League second qualifying round |
| 4 | Sivasspor | 34 | 17 | 9 | 8 | 55 | 38 | +17 | 60 | Qualification for the Europa League group stage |
| 5 | Alanyaspor | 34 | 16 | 9 | 9 | 61 | 37 | +24 | 57 | Qualification for the Europa League third qualifying round |
| 6 | Galatasaray | 34 | 15 | 11 | 8 | 55 | 37 | +18 | 56 | Qualification for the Europa League second qualifying round |
| 7 | Fenerbahçe | 34 | 15 | 8 | 11 | 58 | 46 | +12 | 53 | |

Source: Süper Lig, Soccerway
Rules for classification: 1) Points; 2) Head-to-head points; 3) Head-to-head goal difference; 4) Head-to-head goals scored; 5) Goal difference; 6) Goals scored; 7) Play-off.

=== Results summary ===
| Overall | | | | | | | | Home | | | | | | Away | | | | | |
| Pld | W | D | L | GF | GA | GD | Pts | W | D | L | GF | GA | GD | W | D | L | GF | GA | GD |
|---|---|---|---|---|---|---|---|---|---|---|---|---|---|---|---|---|---|---|---|
| 34 | 16 | 9 | 9 | 61 | 37 | +24 | 57 | 10 | 4 | 3 | 36 | 15 | +21 | 6 | 5 | 6 | 25 | 22 | +3 |

Source: TFF

=== Results by round ===
| Round | 1 | 2 | 3 | 4 | 5 | 6 | 7 | 8 | 9 | 10 | 11 | 12 | 13 | 14 | 15 | 16 | 17 | 18 | 19 | 20 | 21 | 22 | 23 | 24 | 25 | 26 | 27 | 28 | 29 | 30 | 31 | 32 | 33 | 34 |
|---|---|---|---|---|---|---|---|---|---|---|---|---|---|---|---|---|---|---|---|---|---|---|---|---|---|---|---|---|---|---|---|---|---|---|
| Ground | A | H | A | H | A | H | A | H | A | H | A | H | H | A | H | A | H | H | A | H | A | H | A | H | A | H | A | H | A | A | H | A | H | A |
| Result | W | W | W | W | D | D | L | W | D | D | L | L | W | L | D | W | W | W | W | W | D | L | L | L | D | W | L | D | D | W | W | L | W | W |
| Position | 5 | 2 | 1 | 1 | 1 | 1 | 1 | 1 | 1 | 1 | 4 | 7 | 5 | 7 | 8 | 6 | 6 | 5 | 5 | 4 | 4 | 5 | 5 | 6 | 6 | 6 | 6 | 6 | 7 | 7 | 6 | 6 | 6 | 5 |

Updated to match(es) played on 25 July 2020. Source: TFF.org
A = Away; H = Home; W = Win; D = Draw; L = Loss

== Matches ==
| 17 August 2019 1 | Kayserispor | 0–1 | Alanyaspor | Kayseri |
| 21.45 | Atila Turan (yellow card) 19'; Aymen Abdennour (yellow card) 77'; Pedro Henrique Konzen (yellow card) 80'; Bernard Mensah (yellow card) 24' | Report | 86' (yellow card) 87' Papiss Cissé | Stadium: Kadir Has Şehir Stadyumu; Referee: Tugay Kaan Numanoğlu; Assistant referees: Mustafa Sönmez, Mehmet Salih Mazlum; Fourth official: Mustafa Kürşad Filiz |

| 24 August 2019 2 | Alanyaspor | 4–1 | Kasımpaşa | Alanya, Antalya |
| 21.45 | Welinton (yellow card) 19'; Anastasios Bakasetas 29'; Papiss Cissé 54' (yellow card) 67'; Fabrice N'Sakala (yellow card) 56'; Júnior Fernándes 59'; Efecan Karaca (yellow card) 61'; Yacine Bammou 88' | Report | (yellow card) 31' (goal) 33' Mame Baba Thiam; (yellow card) 45' Abdul Khalili; (yellow card) 78' Karim Hafez; (yellow card) 89' Mustafa Pektemek | Stadium: Bahçeşehir Okulları Stadium; Referee: Serkan Tokat; Assistant referees: Erdinç Sezertam, Bahtiyar Birinci; Fourth official: Emre Kargın |

| 1 September 2019 3 | Yeni Malatyaspor | 2–3 | Alanyaspor | Malatya |
| 21.45 | Sakıb Aytaç (yellow card) 9'; Özer Özdemir (yellow card) 41'; Thievy Bifouma 47'; Adis Jahović 57'; Ghailene Chaalali (yellow card) 73'; Mitchell Donald (yellow card) 90' | Report | 20' Ceyhun Gülselam; 22' Júnior Fernándes; 44' Papiss Cissé; (yellow card) 73' Manolis Siopis; (yellow card) 76' Fabrice N'Sakala | Stadium: Malatya Arena; Referee: Alper Ulusoy; Assistant referees: Mehmet Metin, Özgür Ertem; Fourth official: Direnç Tonusluoğlu |

| 16 September 2019 4 | Alanyaspor | 3–1 | Fenerbahçe | Alanya, Antalya |
| 20.00 | Ceyhun Gülselam (yellow card) 22'; Papiss Cissé 45', 46'; Júnior Fernándes 62' | Report | 39' Tolga Ciğerci; (yellow card) 65' Nabil Dirar | Stadium: Bahçeşehir Okulları Stadium; Referee: Halis Özkahya; Assistant referees: Volkan Ahmet Narinç, Asım Yusuf Öz; Fourth official: Cihan Aydın |

| 22 September 2019 5 | Gençlerbirliği | 1–1 | Alanyaspor | Ankara |
| 16.30 | Daniel Candeias (yellow card) 23'; Bogdan Stancu 45' (pen.); Pierre-Yves Polomat (yellow card) 63'; Baiano (yellow card) 88' | Report | (yellow card) 51' Djalma Campos; 66' Ceyhun Gülselam; (yellow card) 72' Welinton; (yellow card) 74' Manolis Siopis | Stadium: Eryaman Stadium; Attendance: 3,647; Referee: Zorbay Küçük; Assistant referees: Mehmet Cem Hanoğlu, İlker Takpak; Fourth official: Ramazan Keleş |

| 28 September 2019 6 | Alanyaspor | 1–1 | Sivasspor | Alanya, Antalya |
| 17.30 | Anastasios Bakasetas (yellow card) 15'; Juanfran (yellow card) 58'; Papiss Cissé 61'; Welinton (yellow card) 90' | Report | 1' Fernando; (yellow card) 45' Uğur Çiftçi; (yellow card) 90' Mamadou Samassa; (yellow card) 90' Mustapha Yatabaré; (yellow card) 90' Ziya Erdal | Stadium: Bahçeşehir Okulları Stadium; Attendance: 4,902; Referee: Halil Umut Meler; Assistant referees: Cevdet Kömürcüoğlu, Ekrem Kan; Fourth official: Mustafa Aydın |

| 6 October 2019 7 | Beşiktaş | 2–0 | Alanyaspor | Istanbul |
| 16.30 | Burak Yılmaz (yellow card) 19' (goal) 51' (pen.); Jeremain Lens (yellow card) 28'; Victor Ruiz Torre (yellow card) 39'; Abdoulay Diaby 68' | Report | (yellow card) 52' Anastasios Bakasetas; (yellow card) 66' Papiss Cissé; (yellow card) 86' Georgios Tzavellas | Stadium: Vodafone Park; Attendance: 23,701; Referee: Arda Kardeşler; Assistant referees: Ali Saygın Ögel, Samet Çiçek; Fourth official: Erkan Özdamar |

| 20 October 2019 8 | Alanyaspor | 5–2 | Çaykur Rizespor | Alanya, Antalya |
| 16.30 | Ceyhun Gülselam 16'; Papiss Cissé 29', 76'; Anastasios Bakasetas 51'; Júnior Fernándes 70' | Report | (yellow card) 33' Braian Samudio; 65' (pen.) 73' (pen.) Fernando Boldrin | Stadium: Bahçeşehir Okulları Stadium; Attendance: 5,286; Referee: Cüneyt Çakır; Assistant referees: Bahattin Duran, Tarık Ongun; Fourth official: Erkan Engin |

| 26 October 2019 9 | Gaziantep | 1–1 | Alanyaspor | Gaziantep |
| 17.30 | Raman Chibsah (yellow card) 45'; Jefferson Nogueira Júnior (yellow card) 84'; Jean-Armel Kana-Biyik 90'; Oğuz Ceylan (yellow card) 90+3' | Report | 33' Papiss Cissé; (yellow card) 66' Kaan Kanak; (yellow card) 90' Ceyhun Gülselam; (yellow card) 90+3' Yacine Bammou | Stadium: New Gaziantep Stadium; Attendance: 5,663; Referee: Serkan Tokat; Assistant referees: Mustafa Sönmez, Samet Çavuş; Fourth official: Gürel Uzuner |

| 2 November 2019 10 | Alanyaspor | 0–0 | İstanbul Başakşehir | Alanya, Antalya |
| 17.30 | Fabrice N'Sakala (yellow card) 44' | Report | (yellow card) 52' Enzo Crivelli | Stadium: Bahçeşehir Okulları Stadium; Attendance: 5,726; Referee: Mete Kalkavan; Assistant referees: Ceyhun Sesigüzel, Kerem Ersoy; Fourth official: Mustafa İlker Coşkun |

| 10 November 2019 11 | Trabzonspor | 1–0 | Alanyaspor | Trabzon |
| 16.30 | Abdülkadir Parmak (red card) 25'; João Pereira (yellow card) 30'; Majid Hosseini 67' (pen.) (penalty missed) 83'; Uğurcan Çakır (yellow card) 82'; Anthony Nwakaeme (yellow card) 90+3'; Majid Hosseini (yellow card) 90+6' | Report | (yellow card) 49' Fabrice N'Sakala; (yellow card) 81' (yellow card) 81' (red card) Júnior Fernándes; (yellow card) 82' Georgios Tzavellas | Stadium: Şenol Güneş Stadium; Attendance: 26,076; Referee: Abdulkadir Bitigen; Assistant referees: Ekrem Kan, Serkan Ok; Fourth official: Caner Ak |

| 24 November 2019 12 | Alanyaspor | 0–1 | Göztepe | Alanya, Antalya |
| 16.30 | Manolis Siopis (yellow card) 34'; Ceyhun Gülselam (yellow card) 36'; Baiano (yellow card) 82' | Report | (yellow card) 45+1' Soner Aydoğdu; 67' André Castro | Stadium: Bahçeşehir Okulları Stadium; Attendance: 5,693; Referee: Volkan Bayarslan; Assistant referees: Bahtiyar Birinci, Yusuf Bozdoğan; Fourth official: Şeref Taştan |

| 30 November 2019 13 | Alanyaspor | 5–0 | MKE Ankaragücü | Alanya, Antalya |
| 17.30 | Anastasios Bakasetas 16', 85'; Djalma Campos 24', 90', 90'; Papiss Cissé (yellow card) 57' | Report | (yellow card) 63' Cebrail Karayel; (yellow card) 90' Dever Orgill | Stadium: Bahçeşehir Okulları Stadium; Attendance: 4,424; Referee: Alper Ulusoy; Assistant referees: Mustafa Emre Eyisoy, Kemal Yılmaz; Fourth official: Emre Kargın |

| 7 December 2019 14 | Galatasaray | 1–0 | Alanyaspor | Istanbul |
| 20.00 | Younès Belhanda 20' (pen.); Jean Michaël Seri (yellow card) 32'; Jimmy Durmaz (yellow card) 89' | Report | (yellow card) 22' Manolis Siopis; (yellow card) 51' Welinton; (yellow card) 78' Onur Bulut; (yellow card) 89' Efecan Karaca | Stadium: Türk Telekom Stadium; Attendance: 28,381; Referee: Halil Umut Meler; Assistant referees: Cevdet Kömürcüoğlu, İbrahim Çağlar Uyarcan; Fourth official: Caner Ak |

| 13 December 2019 15 | Alanyaspor | 0–0 | Antalyaspor | Alanya, Antalya |
| 20.30 | Baiano (yellow card) 58'; Ceyhun Gülselam (yellow card) 78'; Manolis Siopis (yellow card) 90' | Report | (yellow card) 2' Ferhat Kaplan; (yellow card) 15' Hakan Özmert; (yellow card) 36' Ufuk Akyol | Stadium: Bahçeşehir Okulları Stadium; Attendance: 4,519; Referee: Zorbay Küçük; Assistant referees: Volkan Ahmet Narinç, Samet Çavuş; Fourth official: Ferhan Kestanlıoğlu |

| 23 December 2019 16 | Denizlispor | 1–5 | Alanyaspor | Denizli |
| 20.00 | Tiago Lopes (yellow card) 67'; Óscar Estupiñán 83' | Report | (yellow card) 27' Ceyhun Gülselam; 35', 42' Welinton; 43' Djalma Campos; (yellow card) 54' Fabrice N'Sakala; 78' Papiss Cissé; 86' Onur Bulut; (yellow card) 90+3' Efecan Karaca | Stadium: Denizli Atatürk Stadium; Attendance: 6,542; Referee: Hüseyin Göçek; Assistant referees: Mehmet Metin, Yusuf Bozdoğan; Fourth official: Selim Özen |

| 29 December 2019 17 | Alanyaspor | 2–1 | Konyaspor | Alanya, Antalya |
| 16.30 | Papiss Cissé 35', 90'; Ceyhun Gülselam (yellow card) 55' | Report | 8' Erdon Daci; (yellow card) 51' Serkan Kırıntılı; (yellow card) 67' Selim Ay; (yellow card) 75' Ali Turan; (yellow card) 90' Mücahit Can Akçay | Stadium: Bahçeşehir Okulları Stadium; Attendance: 4,771; Referee: Ümit Öztürk; Assistant referees: Özgür Ertem, Osman Gökhan Bilir; Fourth official: Hakan Ülker |

| 18 January 2020 18 | Alanyaspor | 5–1 | Kayserispor | Alanya, Antalya |
| 14.00 | Georgios Tzavellas 38'; Anastasios Bakasetas 59'; Papiss Cissé 62'; Júnior Fernándes 84', 90+2' | Report | (red card) 45+1' Zoran Kvrzic; Hasan Hüseyin Acar (yellow card) 45+3'; Brice Dja Djédjé (yellow card) 55'; Pedro Henrique Konzen 87' | Stadium: Bahçeşehir Okulları Stadium; Attendance: 3,405; Referee: Ali Palabıyık; Assistant referees: Serkan Olguncan, Serkan Çimen; Fourth official: Bilal Köseoğlu |

| 25 January 2020 19 | Kasımpaşa | 1–2 | Alanyaspor | Istanbul |
| 17.00 | Tarkan Serbest (yellow card) 54'; Ricardo Quaresma 67'; Oussama Haddadi (yellow card) 76'; Haris Hajradinović (red card) 90+3' | Report | 34' Papiss Cissé; (yellow card) 45' Baiano; 73' Salih Uçan | Stadium: Recep Tayyip Erdoğan Stadium; Attendance: 1,442; Referee: Özgür Yankaya; Assistant referees: Kamil Çetin, Mehmet Metin; Fourth official: Adem Sarıtaş |

| 2 February 2020 20 | Alanyaspor | 2–1 | Yeni Malatyaspor | Alanya, Antalya |
| 16.00 | Welinton (yellow card) 40'; Anastasios Bakasetas 45+1'; Papiss Cissé 48' (pen.); Fabrice N'Sakala (red card) 60'; Júnior Fernándes (yellow card) 90+5' | Report | (yellow card) 50' Teenage Hadebe; (yellow card) 66' Murat Yıldırım; (yellow card) 79' Arturo Mina; 90+4' Issam Chebake | Stadium: Bahçeşehir Okulları Stadium; Attendance: 4,904; Referee: Mete Kalkavan; Assistant referees: Ceyhun Sesigüzel, Esat Sancaktar; Fourth official: Muhammet Ali Metoğlu |

| 8 February 2020 21 | Fenerbahçe | 1–1 | Alanyaspor | Istanbul |
| 20.00 | Altay Bayındır (yellow card) 27'; Max Kruse 53' (pen.); Jailson Siqueira (yellow card) 90'; Serdar Aziz (yellow card) 90' | Report | (yellow card) 22' Welinton; 29' (pen.) (penalty missed) 61' Papiss Cissé; (yellow card) 32' Salih Uçan; (yellow card) 35' José Marafona; (yellow card) 51' Manolis Siopis | Stadium: Şükrü Saracoğlu Stadyumu; Attendance: 35,074; Referee: Ümit Öztürk; Assistant referees: İbrahim Çağlar Uyarcan, İbrahim Bozbey; Fourth official: Onur Özütoprak |

| 16 February 2020 22 | Alanyaspor | 0–1 | Gençlerbirliği | Alanya, Antalya |
| 13.30 | Ceyhun Gülselam (yellow card) 46'; Kaan Kanak (yellow card) 55'; Welinton (yellow card) 76' | Report | (yellow card) 39' Daniel Candeias; 75' Bogdan Stancu; (yellow card) 90+4' Kristoffer Nordfeldt | Stadium: Bahçeşehir Okulları Stadium; Attendance: 5,473; Referee: Atilla Karaoğlan; Assistant referees: Candaş Elbil, Deniz Caner Özaral; Fourth official: Yalçın Taşkınfurat |

| 21 February 2020 23 | Sivasspor | 1–0 | Alanyaspor | Sivas |
| 20.00 | Mert Hakan Yandaş 9' (pen.); Erdoğan Yeşilyurt (yellow card) 32'; Marcelo Goiano (yellow card) 45+3'; Hakan Arslan (yellow card) 64'; Mamadou Samassa (yellow card) 73'; Fatih Aksoy (yellow card) 90' | Report | (yellow card) 8' Steven Caulker; (yellow card) 27' Onur Bulut | Stadium: New Sivas 4 Eylül Stadium; Attendance: 11,084; Referee: Zorbay Küçük; Assistant referees: İbrahim Çağlar Uyarcan, Volkan Ahmet Narinç; Fourth official: Yakup Özhan |

| 28 February 2020 24 | Alanyaspor | 1–2 | Beşiktaş | Alanya, Antalya |
| 20.00 | Júnior Fernándes 37'; Manolis Siopis (yellow card) 42' | Report | 70' 87' (pen.) Burak Yılmaz | Stadium: Bahçeşehir Okulları Stadium; Attendance: 7,240; Referee: Halis Özkahya; Assistant referees: Mehmet Metin, Samet Çavuş; Fourth official: Erkan Engin |

| 8 March 2020 25 | Çaykur Rizespor | 1–1 | Alanyaspor | Rize |
| 16.00 | Ismaël Diomandé (yellow card) 34'; Braian Samudio 61' | Report | 35' Yacine Bammou; (yellow card) 48' Ceyhun Gülselam; (yellow card) 54' Salih Uçan; (yellow card) 90+1' Baiano | Stadium: Yeni Rize Şehir Stadium; Attendance: 7,085; Referee: Ali Şansalan; Assistant referees: Hakan Yemişken, Samet Çiçek; Fourth official: Bilal Köseoğlu |

| 14 March 2020 26 | Alanyaspor | 1–0 | Gaziantep | Alanya, Antalya |
| 17.00 | Steven Caulker 42' | Report | (yellow card) 15' Oğuz Ceylan; (yellow card) 76' Júnior Morais; (yellow card) 80' Papy Djilobodji | Stadium: Bahçeşehir Okulları Stadium; Attendance: 0 Referee: Atilla Karaoğlan; Assistant referees: Mehmet Kısal, Bahtiyar Birinci; Fourth official: Mustafa Aydın |

| 13 June 2020 27 | İstanbul Başakşehir | 2–0 | Alanyaspor | Istanbul |
| 18.30 | Enzo Crivelli (yellow card) 54'; Mahmut Tekdemir 64'; Edin Višća 80' (pen.) | Report | (yellow card) 38' Ceyhun Gülselam; (yellow card) 41' Júnior Fernándes; (yellow card) 72' Georgios Tzavellas | Stadium: Başakşehir Fatih Terim Stadium; Attendance: 0 Referee: Ali Şansalan; Assistant referees: Kerem Ersoy, Mehmet Cem Satman; Fourth official: Burak Pakkan |

| 22 June 2020 28 | Alanyaspor | 2–2 | Trabzonspor | Alanya, Antalya |
| 21.00 | Papiss Cissé 45+2'; Salih Uçan (yellow card) 45+3'; Fabrice N'Sakala (yellow card) 76' (yellow card) 83' (red card); Anastasios Bakasetas 90+5' | Report | 7' Abdülkadir Ömür; (yellow card) 40' Caleb Ekuban; 51' Filip Novák; (red card) 79' Majid Hosseini | Stadium: Bahçeşehir Okulları Stadium; Attendance: 0 Referee: Atilla Karaoğlan; Assistant referees: Volkan Ahmet Narinç, İbrahim Bozbey; Fourth official: Cihan Aydın |

| 27 June 2020 29 | Göztepe | 3–3 | Alanyaspor | İzmir |
| 21.00 | Serdar Gürler 11'; Celso Borges (yellow card) 22'; Alpaslan Öztürk (yellow card) 43' (goal) 49'; Titi (yellow card) 73'; Stefano Napoleoni 90' | Report | 4' Efecan Karaca; (yellow card) 31' Steven Caulker; (yellow card) 42' Juanfran; 45+3', 64' Papiss Cissé | Stadium: Bornova Stadium; Attendance: 0 Referee: Yaşar Kemal Uğurlu; Assistant referees: Erdinç Sezertam, Serkan Çimen; Fourth official: Kadir Sağlam |

| 4 July 2020 30 | MKE Ankaragücü | 1–4 | Alanyaspor | Ankara |
| 18.30 | Dever Orgill (penalty missed) 44'; Stelios Kitsiou (yellow card) 57'; Gelmin Rivas (yellow card) 77' (goal) 82' | Report | (yellow card) 42' Welinton; 64' Papiss Cissé; 66' Onur Bulut; 78' (pen.) Anastasios Bakasetas; (yellow card) 89' Emircan Altıntaş; 90' Júnior Fernándes | Stadium: Eryaman Stadium; Attendance: 0 Referee: Halil Umut Meler; Assistant referees: Cevdet Kömürcüoğlu, Samet Çiçek; Fourth official: Hakan Ceylan |

| 8 July 2020 31 | Alanyaspor | 4–1 | Galatasaray | Alanya, Antalya |
| 21.00 | Papiss Cissé 43', 45+4'; Ceyhun Gülselam (yellow card) 77'; Anastasios Bakasetas 90'; Mustafa Pektemek 90+6' | Report | 45+5' Adem Büyük; (yellow card) 90+1' Younès Belhanda | Stadium: Bahçeşehir Okulları Stadium; Attendance: 0 Referee: Mete Kalkavan; Assistant referees: Ceyhun Sesigüzel, Kerem Ersoy; Fourth official: Kutluhan Bilgiç |

| 12 July 2020 32 | Antalyaspor | 1–0 | Alanyaspor | Antalya |
| 21.00 | Adis Jahović 22'; Eren Albayrak (yellow card) 57' | Report | (yellow card) 38' Ceyhun Gülselam; (yellow card) 47' Papiss Cissé | Stadium: New Antalya Stadium; Attendance: 0 Referee: Halis Özkahya; Assistant referees: Mehmet Metin, Bahtiyar Birinci; Fourth official: Direnç Tonusluoğlu |

| 19 July 2020 33 | Alanyaspor | 1–0 | Denizlispor | Alanya, Antalya |
| 21.00 | | Report | | Stadium: Bahçeşehir Okulları Stadium; Attendance: 0 Referee: Fırat Aydınus; Assistant referees: Aleks Taşcıoğlu, Erdem Bayık; Fourth official: Abudllah Buğra Taşkınsoy |

| 25 July 2020 34 | Konyaspor | 2–3 | Alanyaspor | Konya |
| 21:00 | | Report | | Stadium: Büyükşehir Belediye Stadyumu; Attendance: 0 |

=== Turkish Cup ===
==== Fourth round ====
| 29 October 2019 | Alanyaspor | 3–0 | İnegölspor | Alanya, Antalya |
| | | | | Stadium: Bahçeşehir Okulları Stadium |

==== Fifth round ====
| 3 December 2019 First leg | Alanyaspor | 5–1 | Adanaspor | Alanya, Antalya |
| 16:30 | Tzavellas 5'; Bammou 48'; Bammou 58'; Bingöl 66' (o.g.); Campos 87' | | Roni 56' | Stadium: Bahçeşehir Okulları Stadium |

| 17 December 2019 Second leg | Adanaspor | 1–7 | Alanyaspor | Adana |
| 18:30 | Akyol 59' | | Güneş 14'; Büyüksakarya 21' (o.g.); Bulut 29'; Tzavellas 44'; Campos 53'; Bulut 74'; Bulut 83' | Stadium: Adana 5 Ocak Stadium |

==== Round of 16 ====
| 15 January 2020 First leg | Alanyaspor | 3–1 | Kasımpaşa | Alanya, Antalya |
| | | | | Stadium: Bahçeşehir Okulları Stadium |

| 22 January 2020 Second leg | Kasımpaşa | 3–2 | Alanyaspor | Istanbul |
| | | | | Stadium: Recep Tayyip Erdoğan Stadium |

==== Quarter finals ====
| 5 February 2020 First leg | Alanyaspor | 2–0 | Galatasaray | Alanya, Antalya |
| 20:30 | Bakasetas 20'; Júnior Fernándes 55' | Report | | Stadium: Bahçeşehir Okulları Stadium; Referee: Ali Şansalan |

| 12 February 2020 Second leg | Galatasaray | 3–1 | Alanyaspor | Istanbul |
| 20:30 | Akbaba 9'; Büyük 55' (pen.), 85' | Report | Bammou 31' | Stadium: Türk Telekom Stadium; Referee: Yaşar Kemal Uğurlu |

==== Semi finals ====
| 4 March 2020 First leg | Antalyaspor | 0–1 | Alanyaspor | Antalya |
| 20:30 | | Report | Junior Fernándes 90' | Stadium: Antalya Stadium; Referee: Alper Ulusoy |

| 18 June 2020 Second leg | Alanyaspor | 4–0 | Antalyaspor | Alanya, Antalya |
| 20:45 | Cissé 15', 46', 49'; Gülselam 25' | Report | | Stadium: Bahçeşehir Okulları Stadium; Referee: Arda Kardeşler |

==== Final ====
| 29 July 2020 | Trabzonspor | 2–0 | Alanyaspor | Istanbul |
| 21:30 | Ömür 25'; Sørloth 90+10' | Report | | Stadium: Atatürk Olympic Stadium; Referee: Ali Palabıyık |
