= Salih Uçan =

Turkish footballer (born 1994)

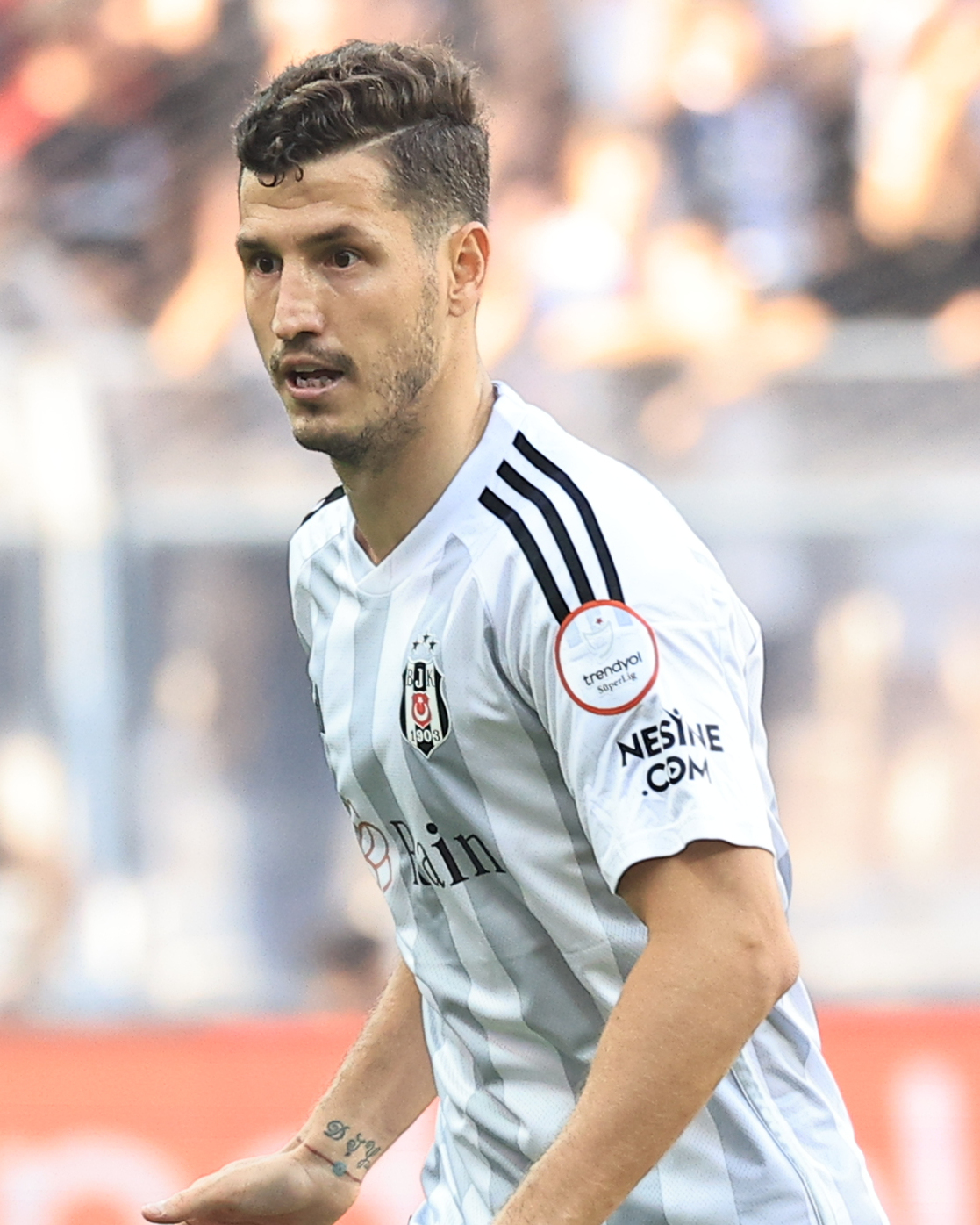
- Uçan with Beşiktaş in 2023

Personal information
- Full name: Salih Uçan
- Date of birth: 6 January 1994 (age 32)
- Place of birth: Marmaris, Muğla, Turkey
- Height: 1.82 m (6 ft 0 in)
- Position: Midfielder

Team information
- Current team: Gençlerbirliği
- Number: 48

Youth career
- 2004–2008: Marmaris Belediyespor
- 2008–2010: Bucaspor

Senior career*
Years	Team	Apps	(Gls)
2010–2012	Bucaspor	24	(1)
2012–2019	Fenerbahçe	37	(3)
2014–2016	→ Roma (loan)	7	(0)
2017–2018	→ Sion (loan)	19	(2)
2018–2019	→ Empoli (loan)	6	(1)
2019	Empoli	8	(0)
2019–2021	Alanyaspor	61	(3)
2021–2026	Beşiktaş	98	(4)
2022	→ İstanbul Başakşehir (loan)	11	(0)
2026–	Gençlerbirliği	6	(0)

International career^{‡}
2008–2009	Turkey U15	10	(5)
2009–2010	Turkey U16	20	(7)
2010–2011	Turkey U17	22	(8)
2011	Turkey U18	20	(10)
2011–2012	Turkey U19	13	(7)
2012–2013	Turkey U20	18	(8)
2013–2016	Turkey U21	16	(0)
2013–2023	Turkey	3	(0)
- * Club domestic league appearances and goals as of 10 October 2026 ‡ National team caps and goals as of 22:37, 12 September 2023 (UTC)

Salih Uçan (born 6 January 1994) is a Turkish professional footballer who plays as a midfielder for Süper Lig club Gençlerbirliği.

== Club career ==
=== Fenerbahçe ===
Fenerbahçe signed Uçan for €1.4 million on 6 June 2012, for a five-year contract worth €220,000 per season. This transfer fee marked the highest fee paid to a Turkish youth player. On 14 March 2013, he scored his debut goal for the club in an UEFA Europa League match against Viktoria Plzeň in the round of 16. His contribution helped Fenerbahçe secure qualification to the quarter-finals of the Europa League with a 1–1 draw in the Şükrü Saracoğlu Stadium. He scored two goals against Orduspor on 7 April 2013 and helped Fenerbahçe win four games in a row in the Süper Lig.

==== Roma (loan) ====
On 7 July 2014, after weeks of protracted negotiations, Uçan's move to Roma on a two-year loan deal for a fee of €4.75 million was completed. The agreement included an option for Roma to either extend the loan by another year or to sign Uçan outright for €11 million in 2016. He made his official Roma debut in the 3–0 victory against Chievo on 18 October 2014. After two years with just 10 appearances, Roma chose to not make use of the option of a permanent signing.

In July 2016 Uçan returned to Fenerbahçe at the end of his two-year loan spell at Roma but 1 year later he loaned out again to Swiss club Sion.

==== Sion (loan) ====
On 31 August 2017, he was loaned out for a second time joining Swiss Super League FC Sion. In his one-year loan spell he played 19 league matches and 1 match in the Swiss Cup.

In July 2018 Uçan returned to Fenerbahçe for second time at the end of his one-year loan spell at Sion however he played friendly matches on his second return.

==== Empoli (loan) ====
On 17 August 2018, Uçan joined to Italian Serie A club Empoli on loan until 30 June 2019. Uçan scored on his debut for the club, the final goal in a 3–3 draw with Frosinone on 21 October 2018.

On 31 January 2019, the last day of the 2018–19 winter transfer window, it was announced that the move had been made permanent.

=== Alanyaspor ===
On 10 July 2019, Uçan signed to Turkish club Alanyaspor.

=== Beşiktaş ===
After his contract expired with Alanyaspor in June 2021, Uçan joined current Turkish champions Beşiktaş on a free transfer. On 4 July 2021, Beşiktaş announced the arrival of Uçan.

On 28 June 2024, Uçan has signed a new 2+1 year contract with Beşiktaş.

==== İstanbul Başakşehir (loan) ====
On 28 January 2022, he joined İstanbul Başakşehir on loan, until the end of the season.

== International career ==
Uçan played all the age categories for the Turkey national team. He was also a part of Turkey national under-20 football team during the 2013 FIFA U-20 World Cup. On 15 November 2013, he played his first national match for Turkey against Northern Ireland in Adana. A decade later he played 2 games.

== Career statistics ==
=== Club ===
As of match played 5 March 2026

Appearances and goals by club, season and competition
Club	Season	League			National cup (Note: Includes Turkish Cup, Coppa Italia, Swiss Cup)		Europe		Total	
Club	Season	Division	Apps	Goals	Apps	Goals	Apps	Goals	Apps	Goals
Bucaspor	2010–11	TFF First League	0	0	2	0	—		2	0
Bucaspor	2011–12	TFF First League	24	1	1	0	—		25	1
Bucaspor	Total		24	1	3	0	—		27	1
Fenerbahçe	2012–13	Süper Lig	10	3	9	0	7	1	26	4
Fenerbahçe	2013–14	Süper Lig	16	0	1	0	0	0	17	0
Fenerbahçe	2016–17	Süper Lig	11	0	7	1	6	0	24	1
Fenerbahçe	Total		37	3	17	1	13	1	67	5
Roma (loan)	2014–15	Serie A	4	0	0	0	0	0	4	0
Roma (loan)	2015–16	Serie A	3	0	1	0	2 (Note: Appearances in UEFA Champions League)	0	6	0
Roma (loan)	Total		7	0	1	0	2	0	10	0
Sion (loan)	2017–18	Swiss Super League	19	2	1	0	—		20	2
Empoli	2018–19	Serie A	14	1	0	0	—		14	1
Alanyaspor	2019–20	Süper Lig	26	1	8	0	—		34	1
Alanyaspor	2020–21	Süper Lig	35	2	4	1	1 (Note: Appearance in UEFA Europa League)	0	40	3
Alanyaspor	Total		61	3	12	1	1	0	74	4
Beşiktaş	2021–22	Süper Lig	10	0	0	0	5	0	15	0
Beşiktaş	2022–23	Süper Lig	29	3	3	0	—		32	3
Beşiktaş	2023–24	Süper Lig	23	1	5	3	10 (Note: Appearances in UEFA Europa Conference League)	1	38	5
Beşiktaş	2024–25	Süper Lig	17	0	2	0	8 (Note: Appearances in UEFA Europa League)	1	27	1
Beşiktaş	2025–26	Süper Lig	13	0	3	1	0 (Note: Appearances in UEFA Europa League)	0	16	1
Beşiktaş	Total		92	4	13	4	23	2	128	10
Başakşehir (loan)	2021–22	Süper Lig	11	0	0	0	0	0	11	0
Career total			265	14	47	6	39	3	351	23

=== International ===
As of 12 September 2023

Appearances and goals by national team and year
National team	Year	Apps	Goals
Turkey
Turkey	2013	1	0
Turkey	2023	2	0
Total		3	0
