= Mustafa Pektemek =

Turkish footballer

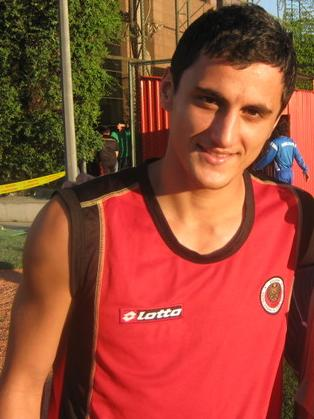
- Pektemek in 2011

Personal information
- Full name: Mustafa Pektemek
- Date of birth: 11 August 1988 (age 38)
- Place of birth: Akyazı, Turkey
- Height: 1.82 m (6 ft 0 in)
- Position: Forward

Team information
- Current team: Güzide Gebzespor
- Number: 11

Youth career
- 1999–2004: Topağaç Spor
- 2004–2005: Akyazıspor
- 2005–2006: Sakaryaspor

Senior career*
Years	Team	Apps	(Gls)
2006–2008	Sakaryaspor	32	(3)
2006–2007	→ Sarıyer (loan)	15	(4)
2008–2011	Gençlerbirliği	64	(23)
2011–2019	Beşiktaş	110	(23)
2016–2017	→ İstanbul Başakşehir (loan)	31	(7)
2019	Kasımpaşa	16	(3)
2020–2021	Alanyaspor	47	(8)
2021–2023	Kayserispor	39	(3)
2023–2024	Eyüpspor	28	(3)
2024	Esenler Erokspor	13	(7)
2024–2025	Sakaryaspor	13	(2)
2025	Pendikspor	11	(0)
2025–	Güzide Gebzespor	12	(2)

International career^{‡}
2007	Turkey U19	11	(2)
2008–2010	Turkey U21	15	(1)
2012–2014	Turkey	12	(3)
- * Club domestic league appearances and goals as of 30 November 2025 ‡ National team caps and goals as of 25 December 2019

Mustafa Pektemek (born 11 August 1988) is a Turkish footballer who plays as a forward for TFF 2. Lig club Güzide Gebzespor.

== Career ==
=== Early career ===
Pektemek started his professional career with Sakaryaspor in 2006. He went on loan to Sarıyer for the second half of the 2006–07 season.

On 27 May 2011, he joined Gençlerbirliği for a fee of €4 million. After breaking his leg at the start of the 2010–11 Süper Lig season, he scored on his first appearance back for Gençlerbirliği six months later, scoring in a 1–0 win against İstanbul Başakşehir.

=== Beşiktaş ===
On 27 May 2011, Beşiktaş announced that Pektemek has been transferred from Gençlerbirliği for €4 million. During the first derby match on the second week of the 2012–13 season against rivals Galatasaray he suffered a knee injury, leaving the match immediately.

On 20 August 2016, Pektemek joined İstanbul Başakşehir on a one-year loan.

=== Career after Besiktas ===
On 27 July 2019, Pektemek joined Kasimpasa on a free transfer.

On 14 January 2020, he joined Süper Lig rivals Alanyaspor on a free transfer.

On 27 July 2021, Pektemek signed for Kayserispor on a two-year deal.

On 13 January 2023, he joined 1.Lig side Eyüpspor.

== Career statistics ==
=== Club ===
As of match played 26 July 2023

Appearances and goals by club, season and competition
Club	Season	League			Cup		Europe		Total	
Club	Season	Division	Apps	Goals	Apps	Goals	Apps	Goals	Apps	Goals
Sakaryaspor	2006–07	Süper Lig	4	0	0	0	0	0	4	0
Sakaryaspor	2007–08	Turkish 1.Lig	28	3	1	0	0	0	29	3
Sakaryaspor	Total		32	3	1	0	0	0	33	3
Sarıyer (loan)	2006–07	Turkish 2.Lig	15	4	0	0	—		15	4
Gençlerbirliği	2008–09	Süper Lig	25	8	0	0	0	0	25	8
Gençlerbirliği	2009–10	Süper Lig	29	10	1	0	0	0	30	10
Gençlerbirliği	2010–11	Süper Lig	10	5	3	1	0	0	13	6
Gençlerbirliği	Total		64	23	4	1	0	0	68	24
Beşiktaş	2011–12	Süper Lig	35	8	2	0	7	1	44	9
Beşiktaş	2012–13	Süper Lig	9	2	0	0	0	0	9	2
Beşiktaş	2013–14	Süper Lig	22	3	0	0	0	0	22	3
Beşiktaş	2014–15	Süper Lig	19	4	2	0	9	1	30	5
Beşiktaş	2015–16	Süper Lig	4	0	7	1	1	0	12	1
Beşiktaş	2017–18	Süper Lig	8	1	5	4	1	0	14	5
Beşiktaş	2018–19	Süper Lig	13	5	0	0	5	0	18	5
Beşiktaş	Total		110	23	16	5	23	2	149	30
İstanbul Başakşehir (loan)	2016–17	Süper Lig	31	7	12	2	0	0	43	9
Kasimpașa	2019–20	Süper Lig	16	3	2	0	0	0	18	3
Alanyaspor	2019–20	Süper Lig	12	1	3	0	0	0	15	1
Alanyaspor	2020–21	Süper Lig	35	7	4	2	9	0	48	9
Alanyaspor	Total		47	8	7	2	9	0	63	10
Kayserispor	2021–22	Süper Lig	27	3	8	1	0	0	35	4
Kayserispor	2022–23	Süper Lig	12	0	2	1	0	0	14	1
Kayserispor	Total		39	3	10	2	0	0	49	5
Eyüpspor	2022–23	Turkish 1.Lig	11	1	0	0	0	0	11	1
Eyüpspor	2023–24	Turkish 1.Lig	0	0	0	0	0	0	0	0
Eyüpspor	Total		11	1	0	0	0	0	11	0
Career total			252	60	33	8	23	2	308	70

=== International ===
Scores and results table. Turkey's goal tally first:

International goals
No.	Date	Venue	Opponent	Score	Result	Competition
1.	5 June 2012	Audi Sportpark, Ingolstadt, Germany	Ukraine	2–0	2–0	Friendly
2.	21 May 2014	Adem Jashari Olympic Stadium, Mitrovica, Kosovo	Kosovo	4–1	6–1	Friendly
3.	21 May 2014	Adem Jashari Olympic Stadium, Mitrovica, Kosovo	Kosovo	5–1	6–1	Friendly

== Honours ==
Beşiktaş

- Süper Lig: 2015–16
