= Steven Caulker =

Sierra Leonean Footballer (born 1991)

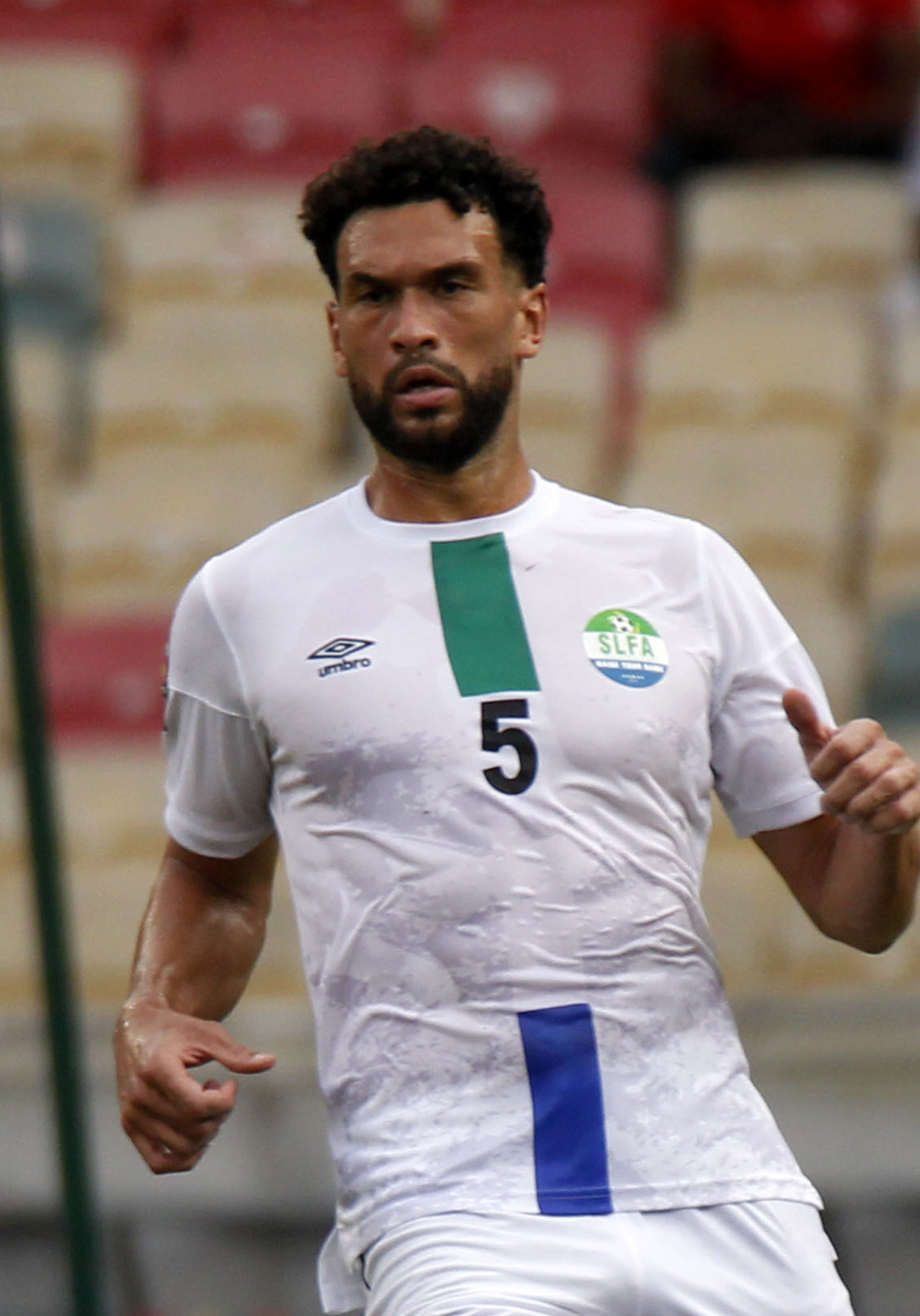
- Caulker in 2022

Personal information
- Full name: Steven Roy Caulker
- Date of birth: 29 December 1991 (age 34)
- Place of birth: Feltham, England
- Height: 6 ft 3 in (1.91 m)
- Position: Centre-back

Team information
- Current team: Konyaspor (assistant manager)

Youth career
- 2007–2009: Tottenham Hotspur

Senior career*
Years	Team	Apps	(Gls)
2009–2013	Tottenham Hotspur	18	(2)
2009–2010	→ Yeovil Town (loan)	44	(0)
2010–2011	→ Bristol City (loan)	29	(2)
2011–2012	→ Swansea City (loan)	26	(0)
2013–2014	Cardiff City	38	(5)
2014–2017	Queens Park Rangers	50	(3)
2015–2016	→ Southampton (loan)	3	(0)
2016	→ Liverpool (loan)	3	(0)
2018	Dundee	14	(1)
2019–2021	Alanyaspor	71	(5)
2021–2022	Fenerbahçe	0	(0)
2021–2022	→ Gaziantep (loan)	25	(2)
2022	Fatih Karagümrük	6	(1)
2023	Wigan Athletic	9	(0)
2024	Málaga City	5	(0)
2024–2025	Ankara Keçiörengücü	33	(0)
2025	Stjarnan	11	(0)
Total		385	(21)

International career
2009–2010	England U19	11	(0)
2010–2013	England U21	10	(2)
2012	Great Britain Olympic	5	(0)
2012	England	1	(1)
2022–2024	Sierra Leone	18	(0)

Managerial career
- 2024: Málaga City
- * Club domestic league appearances and goals

Steven Roy Caulker (born 29 December 1991) is a former professional footballer who played as a centre-back. He currently works as assistant manager at Konyaspor. Born in England, he represented and captained the Sierra Leone national team.

Caulker started his professional career with Tottenham Hotspur in 2009. He spent three seasons on loan with Yeovil Town, Bristol City and Swansea City. At Swansea he made his first appearances in the Premier League and at the end of the season played for Britain at the 2012 Olympics. In November 2012 he made a scoring England debut in a friendly against Sweden.

He was sold to newly promoted Cardiff City for the 2013–14 season but was unable to prevent their relegation from the Premier League. He was subsequently sold to Queens Park Rangers for the following 2014–15 season; who themselves were relegated. He spent the next few seasons largely on loan to Southampton and Liverpool before playing half a season for Dundee in the Scottish Premiership. He then joined Turkish Süper Lig team Alanyaspor in January 2019. After a successful spell there, Caulker signed with top Turkish club Fenerbahçe, but would spend his lone season there on loan with Gaziantep and never play for Fener. Caulker returned to England with Wigan Athletic, but left amid issues with the club failing to pay players. After this, Caulker had a brief stint as player-manager of Spanish side FC Málaga City before having to leave due to issues with his work visa.

== Background ==
Caulker was born in Feltham in the London Borough of Hounslow. He is a member of the Caulker family of Sierra Leone. Caulker attended Staines Preparatory School and was borough champion at 400m for four consecutive seasons.

== Club career ==
=== Tottenham Hotspur ===
A talented athlete as a teenager, Caulker chose to pursue a career in football, playing his early football with Hounslow Borough, his local club. After initially playing as a central midfielder, he acted on advice from a coach and made the switch to central defence. After a single match at centre back for Hounslow at the age of 15, he was offered trials with seven clubs including Tottenham Hotspur, Chelsea, Reading and Queens Park Rangers. Caulker joined the Tottenham Hotspur youth team and broke into the Under-18s team as a 15-year-old during the 2007–08 season. During the 2008–09 season, Caulker progressed to make 31 appearances and score one goal for the Under-18s, captaining the team towards the start of that season. In the same season, he also made five appearances for the reserve team. He impressed during his first season as a full-time scholar and signed his first professional contract at Tottenham in July 2009.

==== Loan to Yeovil Town ====
In July 2009, Caulker went on loan to League One club Yeovil Town along with teammate Ryan Mason. He made his league debut at the start of the 2009–10 season against Tranmere Rovers, where Yeovil won 2–0. After impressing in Yeovil's 0–0 draw with Oldham, Caulker made the Football League Team of the Week. Along with fellow Tottenham loanees Ryan Mason and Jonathan Obika, on 5 November 2009, his loan was extended until the end of the 2009–10 season. On 1 March 2010, Caulker was included in the Team of the Week for a second time following the 1–0 home win against MK Dons. Caulker returned to Spurs one match early after starting 44 of Yeovil's 45 league matches, having missed only one match due to playing for England U19s, also taking four of Yeovil's five end of season awards. In November 2013, he was selected to be part of Yeovil Town's 'Team of the Decade', which was voted for by the club's fans to commemorate their tenth season as a Football League club. Caulker was the only loan player to be chosen.

==== Loan to Bristol City ====
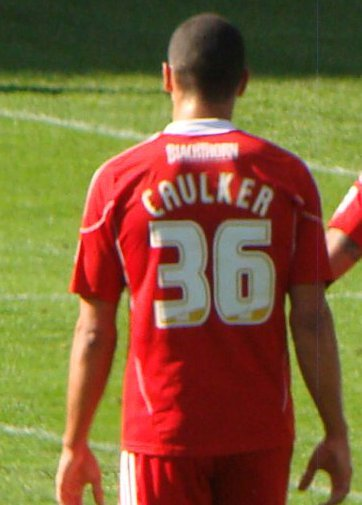
Caulker playing for Bristol City in 2010

After returning from the U19 European Championships and a successful loan spell Caulker was awarded with a new contract until 2013. In early August a Daily Mirror report suggested Caulker may again be loaned out, this time to Championship club Leeds United, in a bid to continue his development through regular competitive football, but this deal fell through when Caulker sustained a groin injury. He made his Tottenham debut in a 4–1 home defeat, after extra time, against Arsenal in the League Cup on 21 September 2010.

Just five days after his Tottenham debut, Caulker was loaned out to Championship club Bristol City until the end of the season where he joined Spurs teammate Danny Rose. He made his Bristol City debut in the 3–1 away defeat to Portsmouth. In his 50th professional match, on 16 October, Caulker scored his first goal in Bristol City's 3–2 defeat against Cardiff City. Thanks to his outstanding form helping guide Bristol City away from the relegation zone, Caulker was rewarded with Young Player of the Month for the npower Football League for November. Caulker scored his second goal of the season with an injury time equaliser in the 2–2 draw with Queens Park Rangers, on 3 January 2011. On 28 March 2011 his season was cut short due to a knee cartilage injury which ruled him out for the rest of the 2010–11 season and so returned to Tottenham for treatment and surgery on his ankle. His 30-match loan spell received praise from both manager Keith Millen and former England goalkeeper David James, described in his Observer column as 'quality' and one of Bristol City's 'best players'. Caulker won Bristol City's Young Player of the Year award for the 2010–11 season and was a nominee for Player of the Year.

==== Loan to Swansea City ====
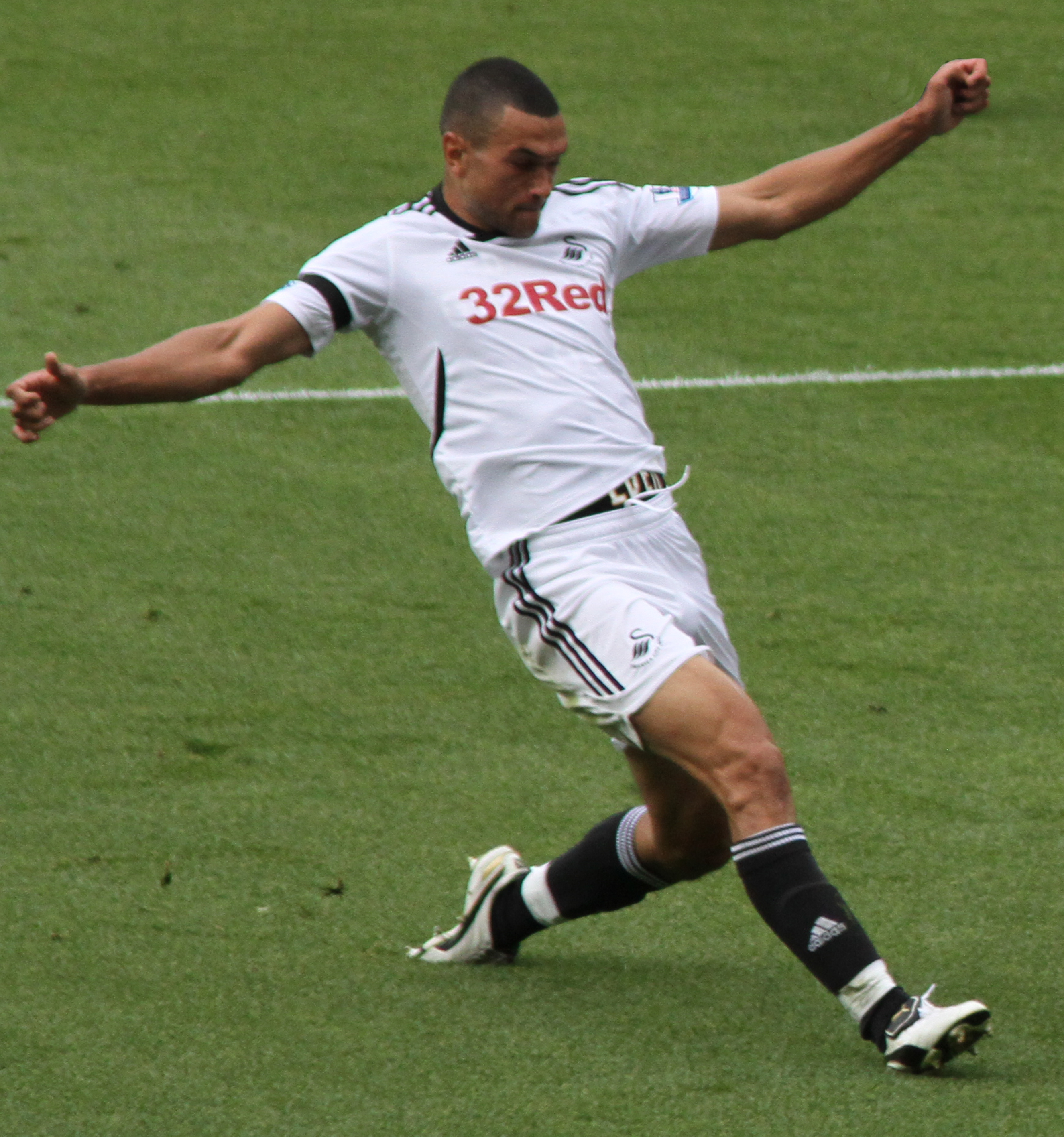
Caulker playing for Swansea City in 2011

In early June 2011, Caulker was linked to a further season-long loan move to help continue his development through regular football, this time to newly promoted Premier League clubs Swansea City and Norwich City, as well as another stint at Bristol City. On 1 July 2011, Caulker officially joined Swansea City on a season-long loan, with Swansea paying an initial fee for his services and an option to review the loan in January. Former member of Spurs' backroom staff and Newport County manager Anthony Hudson described Caulker as having the "potential to be one of the best defenders in country". Hudson said during his time at Bristol City, Caulker was "the best defender in the Championship" and described him as "one to watch this season because I think he's going to be a real star". He made his Premier League and Swansea City debut in the 4–0 away defeat to Manchester City, playing the full 90 minutes. After featuring in all of Swansea's first four Premier League and keeping two clean sheets, Caulker suffered a knee cartilage injury when he collided with a goalpost in Swansea's match against Arsenal. The injury ruled him out for around eight weeks. Despite initially targeting his return for the match against Manchester United on 19 November 2011, Caulker returned to action after three months out in the 2–0 home victory over Fulham on 10 December 2011. Caulker became a mainstay for the remainder of Swansea's Premier League campaign and made 26 starts overall, helping the club finish 11th in the Premier League.

==== Return to Tottenham ====
On 5 July 2012, Caulker signed a new four-year contract with Tottenham Hotspur until the summer of 2016. Having been an unused substitute at the start of the season, on 20 September 2012, Caulker made his European debut in the UEFA Europa League group stage match against Lazio, helping his team keep a clean sheet in a 0–0 draw and having a goal harshly disallowed. The following weekend, Caulker made his Premier League debut for Tottenham Hotspur as a half-time substitute in the 2–1 home victory over Queens Park Rangers. Caulker retained his place and received his first Tottenham league start in the next match against Manchester United, with Tottenham eventually winning the match 3–2, breaking a 23-year winless run at Old Trafford. After the match, centre back partner William Gallas praised Caulker for his performance and felt in time he would become one of the best defenders in England. On 7 October 2012, Caulker scored his first goal for Tottenham in their 2–0 home win against Aston Villa, redirecting a Jermain Defoe shot into the back of the net in the 58th minute of the match. He scored his second goal for the club on 11 November 2012, opening the scoring with a header in a 2–1 defeat away to Manchester City. Caulker finished the season having made 28 appearances in all competitions for Tottenham, scoring two goals.

=== Cardiff City ===
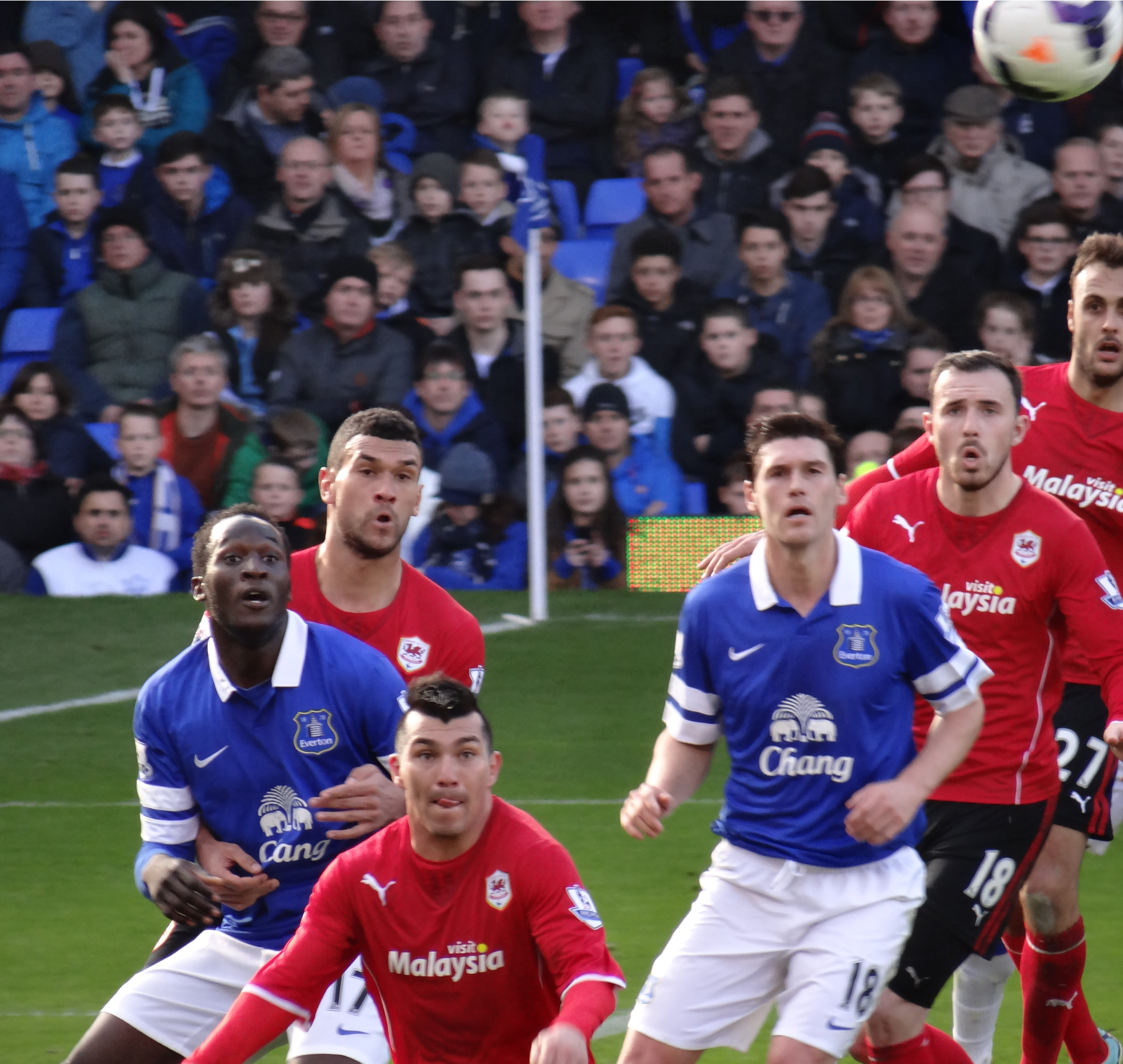
Caulker (red, furthest left) playing for Cardiff City in 2014

On 31 July 2013, newly promoted Premier League club Cardiff City signed Caulker from Tottenham for a club record fee in excess of £8 million, on a four-year contract. Caulker made his Cardiff debut in their first league match of the season a 2–0 defeat against West Ham United, on 17 August 2013. Caulker scored his second league goal for Cardiff in a 1–0 home win against former loan club and rivals Swansea City, the winning goal in the first ever South Wales derby in the Premier League. On 8 March 2014, he scored twice in a 3–1 win against Fulham. Caulker was ever-present for Cardiff in the Premier League playing every minute of the campaign scoring five goals, but was unable to prevent them from suffering relegation back to the Championship.

=== Queens Park Rangers ===
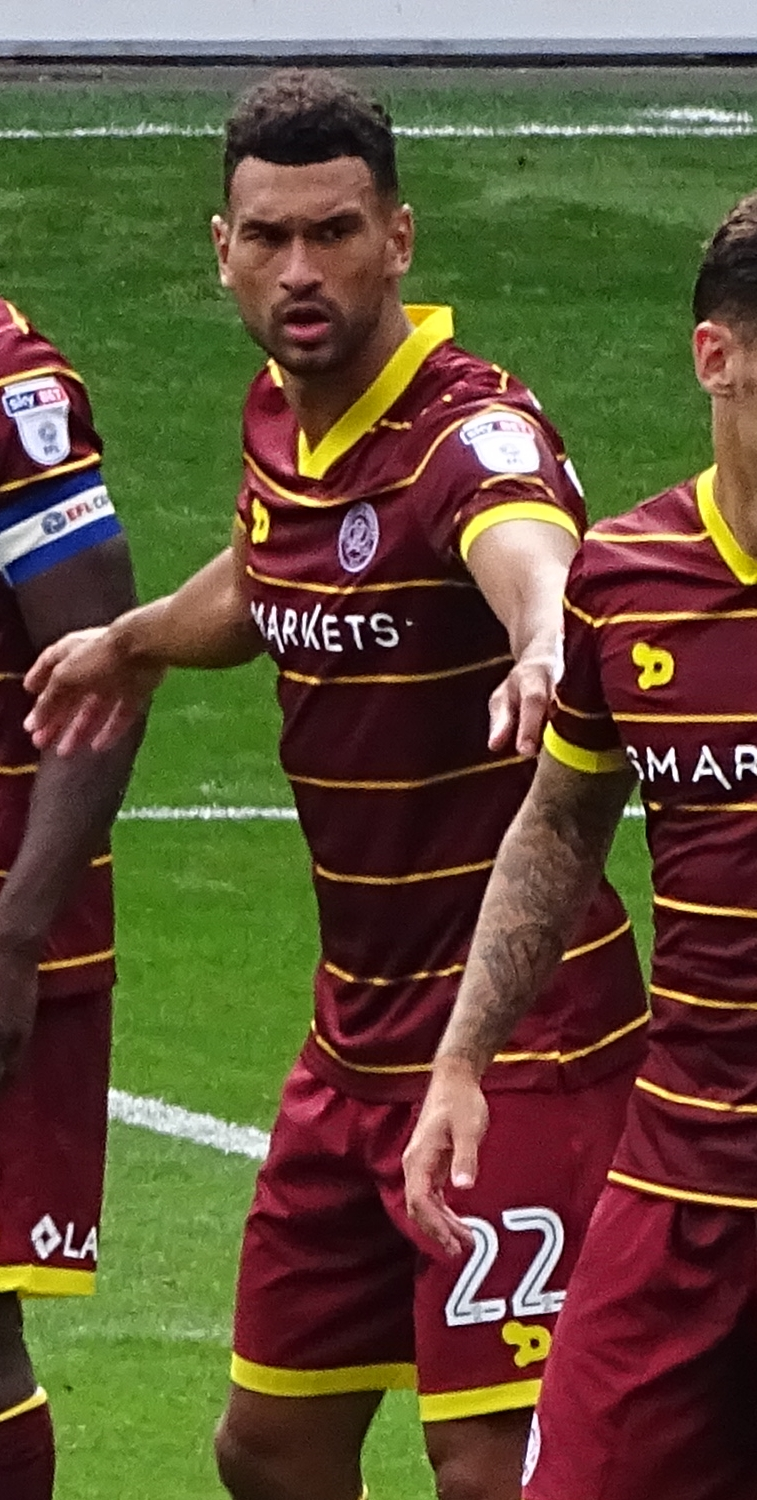
Caulker playing for Queens Park Rangers in 2016

On 22 July 2014, Caulker transferred to Queens Park Rangers for an undisclosed fee, signing a four-year contract. He scored his first goal for the club in a 2–2 home draw against Stoke City on 20 September. He turned down an offer to join his former Swansea City manager, Brendan Rodgers, at Celtic in the summer of 2017, later stating "[Joining Celtic] came close. I decided in the end to stay in London. I was early on in my recovery, and I felt my support network was best in London." Caulker left Queens Park Rangers by mutual consent on 28 December 2017.

==== Loan to Southampton ====
On 29 July 2015, Caulker joined Premier League club Southampton on a season-long loan. He made his debut for Southampton in the second-leg of their Europa League third qualifying round match against Vitesse Arnhem, on 6 August 2015. Caulker only made eight appearances for Southampton, the last of which came in a 6–1 home defeat by Liverpool on 2 December 2015.

==== Loan to Liverpool ====
Caulker's loan with Southampton was cancelled on 12 January 2016 to allow him to join fellow Premier League club Liverpool on loan until the end of the season. Caulker made his Liverpool debut on 13 January 2016 in the 3–3 draw with Arsenal at Anfield when he replaced Adam Lallana as an auxiliary striker in the 87th minute. For the next two league matches, home against Manchester United and away against Norwich City, he entered the match as striker in the 90th minute, contributing to the 95th-minute winner by Lallana in the latter.

=== Dundee ===
Six weeks after departing QPR, on 8 February 2018 Caulker signed a one-and-a-half-year deal with Dundee. He scored on his debut for Dundee in a 3–2 loss at Kilmarnock on 13 February 2018. In April 2018, Dundee rejected a club-record bid for Caulker from Norwegian champions Rosenborg, rumoured to be in the region of £2 million. In the late hours of the transfer window on 31 August, Caulker left Dundee, after he triggered a clause in his contract.

=== Alanyaspor ===
On 15 January 2019, Caulker joined Alanyaspor of the Turkish Süper Lig. Three months later a minibus he was on board with his teammates crashed in Alanya. Josef Šural was killed in the accident; Caulker and several teammates were driven to a nearby hospital, with non-life-threatening injuries from the crash.

Caulker started the first six Alanyaspor games of the 2019–20 season after which his team were unbeaten and top of the league. Alanyaspor lost their next game 2–0 at Beşiktaş in which Caulker was an unused substitute. Caulker finished the season fifth in the league immediately above two of Turkey's traditional big three clubs, Galatasaray and Fenerbahce. The fifth-place finish earned Alanyaspor a Europa League qualifying round place.

=== Fenerbahçe and Gaziantep loan ===
On 30 June 2021, Caulker signed for fellow Turkish Süper Lig side Fenerbahçe on a two-year deal. Caulker would spend his entire 2021–22 season on loan with fellow Süper Lig side Gaziantep. Caulker would be released by Fener at the end of the season despite having another year left on his contract.

=== Fatih Karagümrük ===
On 28 August 2022, Caulker joined Fatih Karagümrük on a free transfer, signing a two-year deal. On 30 December 2022, he left the club after having his contract terminated by mutual consent.

=== Wigan Athletic ===
On 9 January 2023, Caulker joined EFL Championship side Wigan Athletic on a contract until the end of the season. On 24 March 2023, after the club had failed on four occasions to pay players on time, Caulker accused the owners of lying and "absolutely scandalous" behaviour.

=== FC Málaga City (player-manager) ===
On 24 December 2023, Caulker announced that he would become player-manager of Spanish Tercera Federación club FC Málaga City in January 2024. In May 2024, Caulker left the club due to work visa issues.

=== Keçiörengücü ===
In July 2024, Caulker returned to Turkey after signing for TFF First League club Keçiörengücü on a one-year deal with the option of a further one-year extension. He made his debut on 9 August in the league opener away to Sakaryaspor.

=== Stjarnan ===
On 27 June 2025, Caulker announced that he had signed with Besta deild karla club Stjarnan in Iceland as both a player and assistant manager to Jökull Elísabetarson. On 6 August, Caulker made his debut in a league draw away to Fram Reykjavik.

== International career ==
Born and raised in England, with a Sierra Leonean paternal grandfather, and Scottish maternal grandmother, Caulker was eligible to play internationally for England, Scotland, or Sierra Leone.

=== England ===
==== Under-19 ====
Caulker was named along with fellow Spurs loanee Ryan Mason in the England U19s for three European Championship qualification matches in Slovenia, appearing in matches against Finland and Slovenia. Caulker achieved his third and fourth caps for the U19s in friendlies against Turkey and the Netherlands respectively. Caulker was again included in the England U19 squad for the Elite Round of qualification in Ukraine for the European Championships. Caulker played the full 90 minutes of England U19's first two matches, beating Ireland and Bosnia and Herzegovina 1–0 and 4–0 respectively. Caulker also played the full 90 minutes in the final match against Ukraine, a 1–1 draw enough to take England through to the European Championships by winning Group 3 of the Elite qualification round. Caulker was again called up for the final 18-man squad for the European Championships, for group matches against Austria, the hosts France and the Netherlands. Caulker started all three group matches, a 3–2 win over Austria, a 1–0 defeat to the Netherlands and a 1–1 draw with France confirming England's progress to the semi-final stage. England reached the semi-finals, where Caulker earned his 11th cap as England lost 3–1 to Spain. Caulker had started all of England's matches and played all bar a couple of minutes of their games in the tournament. Due to being overage for the next European Championships, Caulker along with the majority of the previous England U19s was not included in the squad for the friendly against Slovakia in September 2010.

==== Under-21 ====
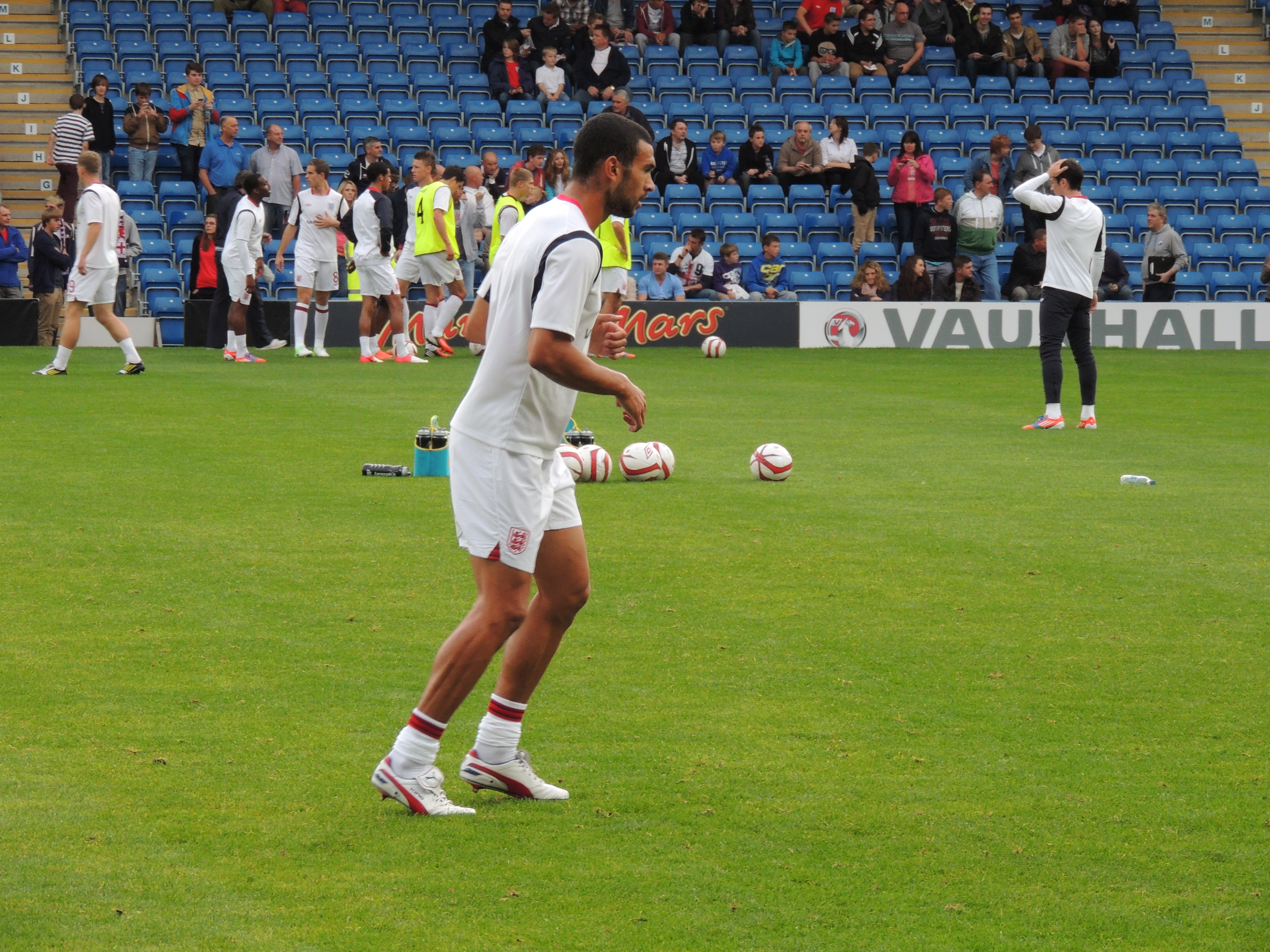
Caulker training before an England U21 match in 2012

Caulker received his first call-up to the England U21 squad for the friendly against Germany on 16 November 2010. He made his debut in that match, coming on as a 77th-minute substitute for Martin Kelly in a 2–0 defeat. In February 2011 Caulker was called up to the England U20 squad for their friendly against France but withdrew after an injury. Caulker was named in the 31-man U21s squad for two warm-up matches for the 2011 U21 European Championship with friendlies against Denmark and Iceland but had to pull out through injury and missed both matches, and the treatment of this injury caused Caulker to miss out on a call-up to the 40-man provisional squad for the 2011 European Championship. Caulker was recalled to the U21s team for the double-header matches against Azerbaijan and Israel in September 2011 and featured in both matches. On 23 February 2012, Caulker was called up for England U21's 2013 European Championship qualification match against Belgium. Caulker started and scored his first international goal in a 4–0 victory on 29 February 2012.

On 31 August 2012, Caulker was called up to the England U21 squad for the European U21 Championship qualification matches against Azerbaijan and Norway. On 6 September 2012, Caulker scored his second consecutive England U21 goal in the team's 2–0 win over Azerbaijan to ensure qualification to the U21 qualification play-offs. Caulker played the full 90 minutes in both of England's play-off matches against Serbia with England's 2–0 aggregate victory marred by ugly scenes after the final whistle. The mass brawl and accusations of racial abuse, later led to the Serbian police charging 11 people in relation to the mass brawl including Caulker and Leeds United player Tom Lees. On 13 December 2012, Caulker was handed a two-match ban by UEFA due to the incident, although in February 2013 this ban was rescinded and instead Caulker was ordered to do a day of community service. Caulker was included in the England U21 squad for the 2013 UEFA European Under-21 Championship, and played in the first two of England's group matches as the team lost all three of their matches and failed to progress to the semi-finals.

==== Senior ====
On 10 August 2012, as part of a new look national team squad Caulker was called up to the senior England team for the first time, ahead of a friendly match against Italy, although he failed to make it onto the pitch. On 8 November 2012, Caulker received his second call up from Roy Hodgson to the England national football team for the friendly against Sweden. Caulker started the friendly against Sweden on 14 November and scored a debut goal when he turned in a Steven Gerrard free kick from the right from three yards out. He played the first 74 minutes before being substituted with England leading 2–1. The team eventually lost 4–2.

=== Great Britain ===
Caulker was named in Stuart Pearce's squad for the 2012 Summer Olympics Great Britain Olympic football team. He made his Team GB debut in a pre-Olympic friendly 2–0 defeat against Brazil. Caulker played in all of Great Britain's matches in the Olympics, making it out of the group stage before being knocked out in the quarterfinals on penalties to South Korea.

=== Scotland eligibility ===
In November 2013, then Scotland assistant manager Mark McGhee confirmed interest in Caulker, as Caulker's grandmother, Jessie, comes from Dollar, Clackmannanshire. Since his only full England cap was in a friendly, he was permitted to change allegiances. In March 2018, Caulker declared his desire to play for Scotland. His then manager at Dundee, Neil McCann, said, "I would love him to pull on the dark blue for Scotland." In October 2019, Caulker contacted then Scotland assistant manager, Steven Reid, to express his desire to play for Scotland.

In December 2020, Caulker expressed his desire to play international football "whether that be for England or Scotland".

=== Sierra Leone ===
In October 2021, Caulker announced he was awaiting clearance from FIFA to switch allegiances from England to Sierra Leone. He also represented the country in an unofficial, non-FIFA sanctioned friendly against a team of local Moroccan footballers which Sierra Leone lost 2–1. On 17 December, Caulker received clearance, from FIFA, making him eligible to play in the forthcoming Africa Cup of Nations. He was included in Sierra Leone's Africa Cup of Nations squad, and played in all three of their games, drawing against defending champions Algeria and Ivory Coast, before losing to Equatorial Guinea and finishing third place in the group with two points.

== Coaching career ==
After experience working in player-coach roles in Spain and Iceland, Caulker was appointed as assistant manager at Süper Lig side Konyaspor in February 2026.

== Personal life ==
On 5 November 2011, Caulker was arrested for a public order offence after an incident in Swansea city centre. He was issued with a fixed penalty notice and later released. Caulker later revealed that his arrest was for swearing in the street and apologised to the club and his manager Brendan Rodgers for getting caught-up in the late night offence.

In June 2017, Caulker was interviewed by The Guardian and discussed his problems with alcohol, gambling addiction and depression. Caulker acknowledged that his problems had damaged his football career and had led him to consider suicide. In November 2023 it was revealed he was dropped as a pundit as sponsor Bet365 were nervous about his previous positive work about gambling addiction.

== Career statistics ==
=== Club ===
As of match played 21 September 2025

Appearances and goals by club, season and competition
Club	Season	League			National cup (Note: Includes FA Cup, Turkish Cup)		League cup (Note: Includes Football League Cup, Scottish League Cup)		Europe		Total	
Club	Season	Division	Apps	Goals	Apps	Goals	Apps	Goals	Apps	Goals	Apps	Goals
Tottenham Hotspur	2009–10	Premier League	0	0	—		—		—		0	0
Tottenham Hotspur	2010–11	Premier League	0	0	0	0	1	0	0	0	1	0
Tottenham Hotspur	2012–13	Premier League	18	2	2	0	2	0	6 (Note: Appearances in UEFA Europa League)	0	28	2
Tottenham Hotspur	Total		18	2	2	0	3	0	6	0	29	2
Yeovil Town (loan)	2009–10	League One	44	0	1	0	1	0	0	0	46	0
Bristol City (loan)	2010–11	Championship	29	2	1	0	—		—		30	2
Swansea City (loan)	2011–12	Premier League	26	0	—		0	0	—		26	0
Cardiff City	2013–14	Premier League	38	5	1	0	0	0	—		39	5
Queens Park Rangers	2014–15	Premier League	35	1	1	0	0	0	—		36	1
Queens Park Rangers	2016–17	Championship	13	2	0	0	1	0	—		14	2
Queens Park Rangers	2017–18	Championship	2	0	0	0	2	0	—		4	0
Queens Park Rangers	Total		50	3	1	0	3	0	—		54	3
Southampton (loan)	2015–16	Premier League	3	0	0	0	2	0	3	0	8	0
Liverpool (loan)	2015–16	Premier League	3	0	1	0	—		—		4	0
Dundee	2017–18	Scottish Premiership	12	1	0	0	0	0	—		12	1
Dundee	2018–19	Scottish Premiership	2	0	0	0	3	0	—		5	0
Dundee	Total		14	1	0	0	3	0	—		17	1
Alanyaspor	2018–19	Süper Lig	10	1	1	0	—		—		11	1
Alanyaspor	2019–20	Süper Lig	29	1	8	0	—		—		37	1
Alanyaspor	2020–21	Süper Lig	32	3	4	1	—		1	0	37	4
Alanyaspor	Total		71	5	13	1	—		1	0	85	6
Fenerbahçe	2021–22	Süper Lig	0	0	0	0	—		—		0	0
Gaziantep (loan)	2021–22	Süper Lig	25	2	2	0	—		—		27	2
Fatih Karagümrük	2022–23	Süper Lig	6	1	1	0	—		—		7	1
Wigan Athletic	2022–23	Championship	9	0	0	0	—		—		9	0
FC Málaga City	2023–24	Tercera Federación - Group 9	5	0	0	0	0	0	0	0	5	0
Keçiörengücü	2024–25	TFF First League	33	0	0	0	0	0	—		33	0
Stjarnan	2025	Besta deild karla	7	0	0	0	—		—		7	0
Career total			381	22	23	1	12	0	10	0	426	23

=== International ===
As of match played 13 November 2024

Appearances and goals by national team and year
National team	Year	Apps	Goals
England	2012	1	1
England		1	1
Sierra Leone	2022	10	0
Sierra Leone	2023	4	0
Sierra Leone	2024	4	0
Sierra Leone	Total	18	0
Total		19	1

As of match played 13 November 2024. England score listed first, score column indicates score after each Caulker goal.

List of international goals scored by Steven Caulker
No.	National team	Date	Venue	Cap	Opponent	Score	Result	Competition	Ref
1	England	14 November 2012	Friends Arena, Solna, Sweden	1	Sweden	2–1	2–4	Friendly	

=== Managerial ===
As of 24 February 2024

Team	From	To	Record							
Team	From	To	G	W	D	L	GF	GA	GD	Win %
Málaga City	1 January 2024	31 May 2024	8	2	2	4	5	11	−6	25.00
Career Total			8	2	2	4	5	11	−6	25.00

== Honours ==
Individual

- Football League Young Player of the Month: November 2010
