= Anastasios Bakasetas =

Greek footballer (born 1993)

Tasos Bakasetas
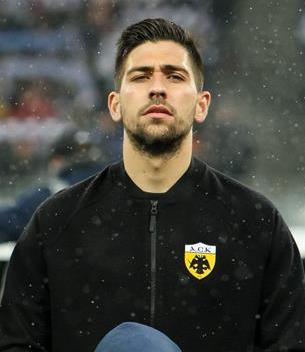
- Bakasetas with AEK Athens in 2018

Personal information
- Full name: Anastasios Bakasetas
- Date of birth: 28 June 1993 (age 33)
- Place of birth: Corinth, Greece
- Height: 1.81 m (5 ft 11 in)
- Positions: Attacking midfielder; forward

Team information
- Current team: APOEL
- Number: 9

Youth career
- –2008: Thyella Petriou
- 2008–2010: Asteras Tripolis

Senior career*
Years	Team	Apps	(Gls)
2010–2015	Asteras Tripolis	42	(4)
2011	→ Thrasyvoulos (loan)	10	(1)
2014	→ Aris (loan)	10	(3)
2015–2016	Panionios	44	(12)
2016–2019	AEK Athens	72	(14)
2019–2021	Alanyaspor	53	(17)
2021–2024	Trabzonspor	98	(26)
2024–2026	Panathinaikos	59	(13)
2026–	APOEL	7	(5)

International career^{‡}
2011–2012	Greece U19	22	(5)
2013	Greece U20	4	(0)
2012–2014	Greece U21	4	(0)
2016–	Greece	82	(19)
Medal record
Men's football
Representing Greece
UEFA European Under-19 Championship
Runner-up	2012 Estonia
- * Club domestic league appearances and goals as of 8 November 2026 ‡ National team caps and goals as of 31 March 2026

Anastasios "Tasos" Bakasetas (Greek: Αναστάσιος "Τάσος" Μπακασέτας; born 28 June 1993) is a Greek professional footballer who plays as an attacking midfielder for Cypriot First Division club APOEL and captains the Greece national team.

== Club career ==
=== Asteras Tripolis ===
Bakasetas came through the youth system at Asteras Tripolis, and was promoted to the first team in the 2010–11 Super League season, for which he was assigned squad number 12. He made five league appearances for the club in this season, four of which were as a substitute, and two in the Greek Cup. His Super League debut was in a starting position against Xanthi on 28 November 2010, a match Asteras Tripolis lost 2–1 despite taking the lead.

In the Greek Cup, he made his first start in a 1–0 defeat to Olympiacos on 22 December 2010. His final appearance for Asteras Tripolis in the 2010–11 season came as a second-half substitute in a 3–0 league defeat against AEK Athens on 16 January 2011.

==== Loan to Thrasyvoulos ====
At the end of January 2011, he went on loan to Thrasyvoulos in the second tier Greek Football League. He played ten league games for Thrasyvoulos, scoring his first senior goal against Ethnikos Asteras in a 2–0 win on 28 February 2011. He returned to Asteras Tripolis at the end of the season in July 2011.

==== Loan to Aris ====
At the end of December 2013, he went on loan to Aris to try and help them avoid relegation. He made his debut to his new team in an away loss from Levadiakos scoring two goals in a 4–3 defeat. He scored another goal before his loan finished. Unfortunately he couldn't help the side avoid relegation.

=== Panionios ===
On 28 January 2015, Bakasetas signed a two years' contract with Panionios for an undisclosed fee. He started the 2015–16 season with two goals in the opening three matches. On 17 October 2015, he scored the two goals of his club in a 2–0 home win against AEL Kalloni.

=== AEK Athens ===
On 8 June 2016, Bakasetas signed a three-years contract with AEK Athens for an undisclosed fee. On 17 September 2016, he netted the first goal with the club in an away 2–0 win against Veria. On 9 April 2017, Bakasetas scored a brace in a 5–0 home win against Kerkyra.

On 10 September 2017, he scored his first goal of the 2017–18 season in a 4–0 home win against AEL. On 22 April 2018, Bakasetas scored twice against Levadiakos to secure their first Super League title since 1994.

On 10 January 2019, Bakasetas agreed to a contract extension with AEK until the summer of 2022.

=== Alanyaspor ===
On 14 June 2019, Bakasetas agreed to join Turkish Süper Lig club Alanyaspor for a fee estimated at €700,000 plus bonuses. On 24 August 2019, he scored his first league goal for the club, in a 4–1 home win against Kasımpaşa. On 20 October 2019, he scored with a kick after an assist from Onur Bulut in a 5–2 home win game against Çaykur Rizespor. On 30 November 2019, Bakasetas was in superb form during the game against Ankaragücü in Alanya, hitting the target twice in a comfortable 5–0 triumph and has been included in the Team of the Week in the Turkish Süper Lig. On 18 January 2020, he scored with a kick, in a hammering 5–1 home win game against Kayserispor. On 2 February 2020, as the first half approached its climax, Bakasetas successfully connected with an accurate cross from Papiss Cissé, thumping a powerful header into the right corner. Alanyaspor, finishing the match with 10 men, subsequently claimed a 2–1 triumph against Yeni Malatyaspor at home. On 5 February 2020, he scored with a wonderful kick in a 2–0 Turkish Cup home win game against Galatasaray. On 22 June 2020, in the fifth minute of stoppage time against title challengers Trabzonspor at home, the 26-year-old attacking midfielder came to the rescue again for Alanyaspor, beating his opponent for skill before unleashing a powerful attempt which flew under the goalkeeper and into the net, in a 2–2 home draw game.

On mid September 2020, Fenerbahçe that has been the leader in the transfer window in the Süper Lig, is about to finish the transfer of Anastasios Bakasetas, which has been negotiating for a long time. According to various reports, Fenerbahçe and Alanyaspor reached the final stage in negotiations after long negotiations and got closer to the agreement. The Greek international midfielder, who played in all 34 league games, marked the season with 10 goals and 5 assists, also entered the radar of Italian clubs.

=== Trabzonspor ===
On 30 January 2021, Trabzonspor snap up Greek midfielder Bakasetas, who mainly operates as an attacking midfielder, had a previous stint in Turkey with Aytemiz Alanyaspor, racking up 21 goals and 12 assists in 64 appearances. On 4 February 2021, in his first appearance with the club, the Greek midfielder scored the winner at the 61st minute at Trabzon's Medical Park Stadium against Denizlispor. On 16 August 2021, Bakasetas scored the first goal of the club for the season, in a hammering 5–1 away win against Yeni Malatyaspor. A week later he opened the score with a penalty kick in a 2–1 home win game against Sivasspor. On 18 September 2021, he scored with a wonderful kick after Anthony Nwakaeme's assist, sealing a vital 1–0 away win against Kasımpaşa S.K. On 2 October 2021, Trabzonspor defeated Kayserispor 2–1 in the 8th week of the Süper Lig, with both goals scored by the Greek international in a breathtaking match. On 17 October 2021, Bakasetas scored a brace in the victory of Trabzonspor against Fenerbahçe for the top derby of the Süper Lig. On 6 November 2021, in a 2–1 away win against rivals Beşiktaş J.K., which established its club at the top of the League after 12 games, the 28-year-old midfielder received a hard tackle from Rachid Ghezzal in the 27th minute of the match, but even after the necessary medical assistance, he was substituted in the first half, as he could not continue. The rehabilitation period was estimated at three weeks, according to medical reports. On 19 January 2022, Bakasetas was defeated twice by Okan Kocuk on a penalty kick and in the replay of the match between Trabzonspor and Giresunspor and could not give the victory to his club, but a week later he tied at 1–1 with a kick in a decisive away victory against Galatasaray in his club effort to win the championship.

=== Panathinaikos ===
On 22 January 2024, Bakasetas returned to Greece joining Panathinaikos for a fee of about €1 million.

On 21 April 2024, Bakasetas recorded two goals and two assists in a 5–0 away routing of Lamia.

=== APOEL ===
On 5 September 2026, Bakasetas signed for APOEL.

== International career ==
Bakasetas has represented his country at youth international level. He was selected in the Greece under-19s squad for the 2011 European Under-19 Football Championship along with Asteras Tripolis teammate Nikolaos Skondras.

He made his under-19 debut in one of the two opening games of the tournament, as a 55th-minute substitute in a 2–1 defeat against the Republic of Ireland under-19s on 20 July 2011. He made his first start in the second group game, a 1–0 victory against the Romania under-19s on 23 July 2011.

On 19 May 2016, he was called up for the friendly matches against Australia on 4 and 7 June 2016. On 4 June 2016, he made his international debut as a substitute, in a 1–0 friendly loss against Australia, when Mathew Leckie scored with the final kick of the game to help the Socceroos beat Greece.

On 25 March 2021, Bakasetas converted a goal from the spot to stun Luis Enrique's team and earn his side an impressive point in a 1–1 away draw for the 2022 World Cup qualifying campaign against Spain, as substitute Iñigo Martínez conceded a penalty for a rash tackle on Greek midfielder Georgios Masouras. On 8 September 2021, Bakasetas gave Greece the lead in the 2nd half with a wonderful slalom after Anastasios Douvikas' assist, en route to giving Sweden their first loss (2–1) of 2022 World Cup qualifying.

== Career statistics ==
=== Club ===
As of 9 November 2026

Appearances and goals by club, season and competition
Club	Season	League			National cup (Note: Includes Greek Cup, Turkish Cup)		Continental		Other		Total	
Club	Season	Division	Apps	Goals	Apps	Goals	Apps	Goals	Apps	Goals	Apps	Goals
Asteras Tripolis	2009–10	Super League Greece	1	0	0	0	—		—		1	0
Asteras Tripolis	2010–11	Super League Greece	5	0	2	0	—		—		7	0
Asteras Tripolis	2011–12	Super League Greece	9	1	1	0	—		—		10	1
Asteras Tripolis	2012–13	Super League Greece	10	2	0	0	4 (Note: Appearance(s) in UEFA Europa League)	0	—		14	2
Asteras Tripolis	2013–14	Super League Greece	9	0	2	0	1	0	—		12	0
Asteras Tripolis	2014–15	Super League Greece	8	1	2	0	6	1	—		16	2
Asteras Tripolis	Total		42	4	7	0	11	1	0	0	60	5
Thrasyvoulos (loan)	2010–11	Super League Greece 2	10	1	0	0	—		—		10	1
Aris (loan)	2013–14	Super League Greece	10	3	0	0	—		—		10	3
Panionios	2014–15	Super League Greece	13	1	1	0	—		0	0	14	1
Panionios	2015–16	Super League Greece	31	11	6	1	0	0	0	0	37	12
Panionios	Total		44	12	7	1	0	0	0	0	51	13
AEK Athens	2016–17	Super League Greece	23	4	5	2	2	0	—		30	6
AEK Athens	2017–18	Super League Greece	27	6	9	2	8 (Note: Appearances in UEFA Champions League)	0	—		44	8
AEK Athens	2018–19	Super League Greece	22	4	3	1	5	1	—		30	6
AEK Athens	Total		72	14	17	5	15	1	—		104	20
Alanyaspor	2019–20	Süper Lig	34	10	9	4	—		—		43	14
Alanyaspor	2020–21	Süper Lig	19	7	2	0	1	0	—		22	7
Alanyaspor	Total		53	17	11	4	1	0	—		65	21
Trabzonspor	2020–21	Süper Lig	19	6	0	0	—		—		19	6
Trabzonspor	2021–22	Süper Lig	34	8	5	1	4 (Note: Appearances in UEFA Europa Conference League)	0	—		43	9
Trabzonspor	2022–23	Süper Lig	27	8	3	0	8 (Note: Two appearances and one goal in UEFA Champions League, six appearances and three goals in UEFA Europa League)	4	1 (Note: Appearance in Turkish Super Cup)	1	39	13
Trabzonspor	2023–24	Süper Lig	18	4	1	1	—		—		19	5
Trabzonspor	Total		98	26	9	2	12	4	1	1	120	33
Panathinaikos	2023–24	Super League Greece	15	7	5	0	0	0	—		20	7
Panathinaikos	2024–25	Super League Greece	22	1	4	1	13 (Note: Eight appearances and one goal in UEFA Conference League, four appearances and one goal in UEFA Europa League)	2	—		39	4
Panathinaikos	2025–26	Super League Greece	22	5	5	4	14 (Note: two appearances in UEFA Champions League, eleven appearances in UEFA Europa League)	0	0	0	41	9
Panathinaikos	Total		59	13	14	5	27	2	0	0	100	20
APOEL FC	2026–27	Cypriot First Division	7	5	1	0	0	0	—		8	5
Career total			385	92	66	17	66	8	1	1	520	118

=== International ===
As of matches played 31 March 2026

Appearances and goals by national team and year
National team	Year	Apps	Goals
Greece	2016	6	0
Greece	2017	5	0
Greece	2018	8	0
Greece	2019	6	0
Greece	2020	8	2
Greece	2021	10	3
Greece	2022	10	5
Greece	2023	10	3
Greece	2024	10	4
Greece	2025	7	2
Greece	2026	2	0
Total		82	19

Scores and results list Greece's goal tally first, score column indicates score after each Bakasetas goal.

List of international goals scored by Anastasios Bakasetas
No.	Date	Venue	Opponent	Score	Result	Competition
1	11 October 2020	Olympic Stadium, Athens, Greece	Moldova	1–0	2–0	2020–21 UEFA Nations League C
2	15 November 2020	Zimbru Stadium, Chișinău Moldova	Moldova	2–0	2–0	2020–21 UEFA Nations League C
3	25 March 2021	Nuevo Los Cármenes, Granada, Spain	Spain	1–1	1–1	2022 FIFA World Cup qualification
4	8 September 2021	Olympic Stadium, Athens, Greece	Sweden	1–0	2–1	2022 FIFA World Cup qualification
5	9 October 2021	Batumi Stadium, Batumi, Georgia	Georgia	1–0	2–0	2022 FIFA World Cup qualification
6	2 June 2022	Windsor Park, Belfast, Northern Ireland	Northern Ireland	1–0	1–0	2022–23 UEFA Nations League C
7	5 June 2022	Fadil Vokrri Stadium, Pristina, Kosovo	Kosovo	1–0	1–0	2022–23 UEFA Nations League C
8	9 June 2022	Panthessaliko Stadium, Volos, Greece	Cyprus	1–0	3–0	2022–23 UEFA Nations League C
9	17 November 2022	Ta'Qali National Stadium, Attard, Malta	Malta	1–0	2–2	Friendly
10	20 November 2022	Puskas Arena, Budapest, Hungary	Hungary	1–1	1–2	Friendly
11	24 March 2023	Estádio Algarve, Almancil, Portugal	Gibraltar	3–0	3–0	UEFA Euro 2024 qualifying
12	16 June 2023	Agia Sophia Stadium, Athens, Greece	Republic of Ireland	1–0	2–1	UEFA Euro 2024 qualifying
13	21 November 2023	Agia Sophia Stadium, Athens, Greece	France	1–1	2–2	UEFA Euro 2024 qualifying
14	21 March 2024	Agia Sophia Stadium, Athens, Greece	Kazakhstan	1–0	5–0	UEFA Euro 2024 qualifying
15	11 June 2024	Untersberg-Arena, Grödig, Austria	Malta	1–0	2–0	Friendly
16	13 October 2024	Karaiskakis Stadium, Pireaus, Greece	Republic of Ireland	1–0	2–0	2024-25 UEFA Nations League B
17	17 November 2024	Helsinki Olympic Stadium, Helsinki, Finland	Finland	1–0	2–0	2024-25 UEFA Nations League B
18	5 September 2025	Karaiskakis Stadium, Piraeus, Greece	Belarus	3–0	5–1	2026 FIFA World Cup qualification
19	15 November 2025	Karaiskakis Stadium, Piraeus, Greece	Scotland	1–0	3–2	2026 FIFA World Cup qualification

== Honours ==
Asteras Tripolis

- Greek Cup runner-up: 2012–13

AEK Athens

- Super League Greece: 2017–18
- Greek Cup runner-up: 2016–17, 2017–18, 2018–19

Alanyaspor

- Turkish Cup runner-up: 2019–20

Trabzonspor

- Süper Lig: 2021–22
- Turkish Super Cup: 2022

Panathinaikos

- Greek Cup: 2023–24

Greece U19

- UEFA European Under-19 Championship runner-up: 2012

Individual

- Super League Greece Team of the Season: 2015–16
- Best Greek Player playing Abroad: 2019–20, 2021–22
- Süper Lig Team of the Season: 2022–23
