= Berkan Kutlu =

Turkish footballer (born 1998)

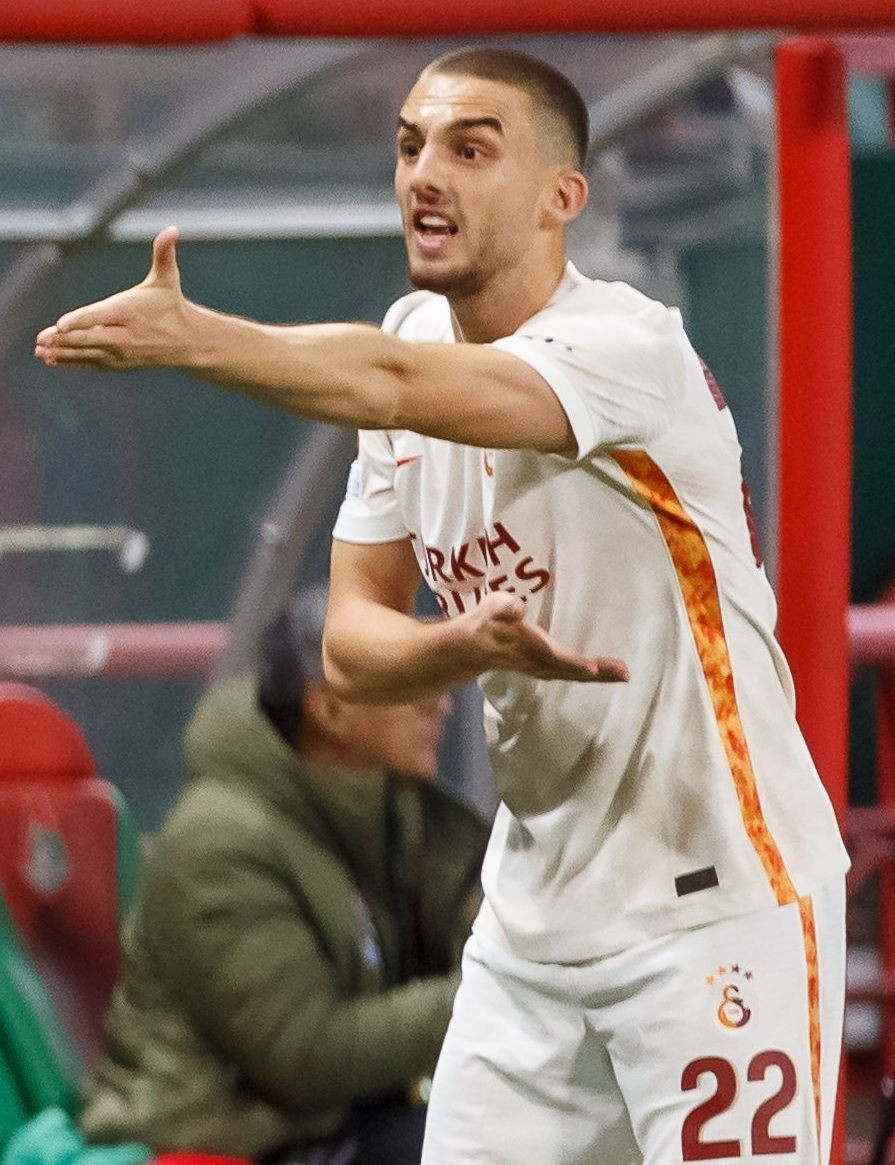
- Kutlu with Galatasaray in 2021

Personal information
- Full name: Berkan İsmail Kutlu
- Date of birth: 25 January 1998 (age 28)
- Place of birth: Monthey, Switzerland
- Height: 1.85 m (6 ft 1 in)
- Position: Midfielder

Team information
- Current team: Kocaelispor
- Number: 10

Senior career*
Years	Team	Apps	(Gls)
2016–2018	Monthey	39	(6)
2018–2019	Sion U21	27	(1)
2019–2020	Sion	2	(0)
2020–2021	Alanyaspor	37	(3)
2021–2026	Galatasaray	104	(2)
2023–2024	→ Genoa (loan)	6	(0)
2026	Konyaspor	13	(2)
2026–	Kocaelispor	8	(3)

International career^{‡}
2020	Turkey U21	3	(0)
2021–	Turkey	8	(0)
- * Club domestic league appearances and goals as of 18 October 2026 ‡ National team caps and goals as of 22:00, 15 October 2022 (UTC)

Berkan İsmail Kutlu (born 25 January 1998) is a professional footballer who plays as a midfielder for Turkish Süper Lig club Kocaelispor. Born in Switzerland, he represents Turkey internationally.

== Club career ==
After a couple successful amateur season with Monthey, Kutlu signed a contract with Sion on 2 July 2018. Kutlu made his professional debut with FC Sion in a 1–1 Swiss Super League tie with Servette on 24 June 2020.

=== Alanyaspor ===
Kutlu signed with Alanyaspor in Turkey on 10 July 2020.

=== Galatasaray ===
On 29 July 2021, Kutlu signed a five-year agreement with Galatasaray, starting from the 2021–22 season.

Kutlu became the champion in the Süper Lig in the 2022–23 season with Galatasaray. Defeating Ankaragücü 4–1 away in the match played in the 36th week on 30 May 2023, Galatasaray secured the lead with two weeks before the end and won the 23rd championship in its history.

==== Genoa (loan) ====
On 31 August 2023, Genoa signed Kutlu on loan for the 2023–24 season with option to buy for €5 million.

==== Return to Galatasaray ====
It was announced that he returned to Galatasaray on 12 January 2024.

His departure from Galatasaray on January 4, 2026, was announced.

== International career ==
Kutlu was born in Switzerland and is of Turkish descent. He represented the Turkey national U21 team in a 1–0 2021 European Under-21 Championship qualification win over Andorra U21 on 4 September 2020. He debuted for the senior Turkey national team in a 1–1 2022 FIFA World Cup qualification tie with Norway on 8 October 2021.

== Career statistics ==
=== Club ===
As of match played 23 August 2024

Appearances and goals by club, season and competition
Club	Season	League			National Cup (Note: Includes Swiss Cup, Turkish Cup, Coppa Italia)		Europe		Other		Total	
Club	Season	Division	Apps	Goals	Apps	Goals	Apps	Goals	Apps	Goals	Apps	Goals
Monthey	2016–17	2. Liga Interregional	15	1	0	0	—		—		15	1
Monthey	2017–18	2. Liga Interregional	24	5	2	3	—		—		26	8
Monthey	Total		39	6	2	3	—		—		41	9
Sion B	2018–19	Promotion League	27	1	—		—		—		27	1
Sion B	2019–20	Promotion League	14	2	—		—		—		14	2
Sion B	Total		41	3	—		—		—		41	3
Sion	2019–20	Super League	2	0	0	0	—		—		2	0
Alanyaspor	2020–21	Süper Lig	38	3	4	0	—		—		42	3
Galatasaray	2021–22	Süper Lig	35	0	1	0	12 (Note: Appearance(s) in UEFA Europa League)	0	—		48	0
Galatasaray	2022–23	Süper Lig	24	0	4	1	—		—		28	1
Galatasaray	2023–24	Süper Lig	20	2	3	0	8 (Note: Six appearances in UEFA Champions League, two appearances in UEFA Europa League)	0	1 (Note: Appearance(s) in Turkish Super Cup)	0	32	2
Galatasaray	Total		79	2	8	1	20	0	1	0	108	3
Genoa (loan)	2023–24	Serie A	6	0	2	0	—		—		8	0
Career total			205	14	16	4	20	0	1	0	242	18

== Honours ==
Galatasaray

- Süper Lig: 2022–23, 2023–24, 2024–25
- Turkish Cup: 2024–25
- Turkish Super Cup: 2023
