= Alpay Çelebi =

Turkish footballer

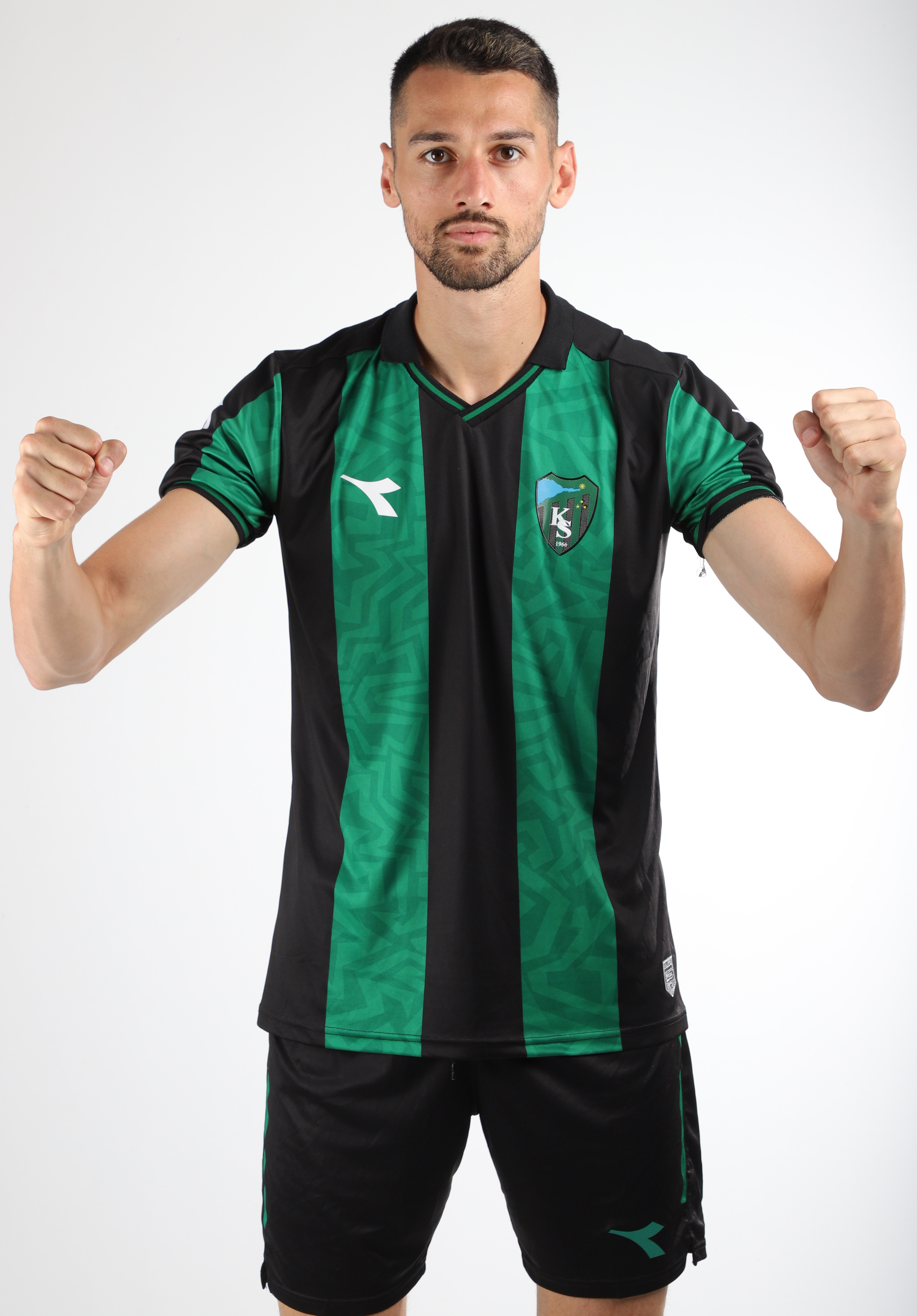
- Çelebi in 2022

Personal information
- Full name: Alpay Çelebi
- Date of birth: 4 April 1999 (age 27)
- Place of birth: Derince, Turkey
- Height: 1.91 m (6 ft 3 in)
- Position: Centre-back

Team information
- Current team: Adana 01 FK
- Number: 4

Youth career
- 2010–2011: Derincespor
- 2011–2013: Fenerbahçe
- 2013–2014: Derincespor
- 2014–2015: Körfez
- 2015–2017: Beşiktaş

Senior career*
Years	Team	Apps	(Gls)
2017–2022	Beşiktaş	0	(0)
2019–2020	→ Kayserispor (loan)	1	(0)
2020–2021	→ Alanyaspor (loan)	1	(0)
2021–2022	→ Kocaelispor (loan)	11	(0)
2022	Kocaelispor	11	(0)
2023	Adanaspor	1	(0)
2023	Keçiörengücü	5	(0)
2023–2024	Belediye Derincespor	28	(1)
2024	Kastamonuspor 1966	19	(1)
2025	Şanlıurfaspor	11	(0)
2025–	Adana 01 FK	14	(1)

International career
2018	Turkey U19	9	(0)
- * Club domestic league appearances and goals as of 30 November 2025

Alpay Çelebi (born 4 April 1999) is a Turkish professional footballer who plays as a centre-back for TFF 2. Lig club Adana 01 FK.

== Professional career ==
A youth product of Beşiktaş, Çelebi joined Kayserispor on a 1 year loan on 6 August 2019. Çelebi made his professional debut with Kayserispor in a 1-0 Süper Lig loss to Alanyaspor on 17 August 2019.

On July 7, 2022 Çelebi signed 2+1 year deal with Second League club Kocaelispor.
