= Alanya Oba Stadium =

Sports stadium in Alanya, Turkey

Gain Park Stadyumu
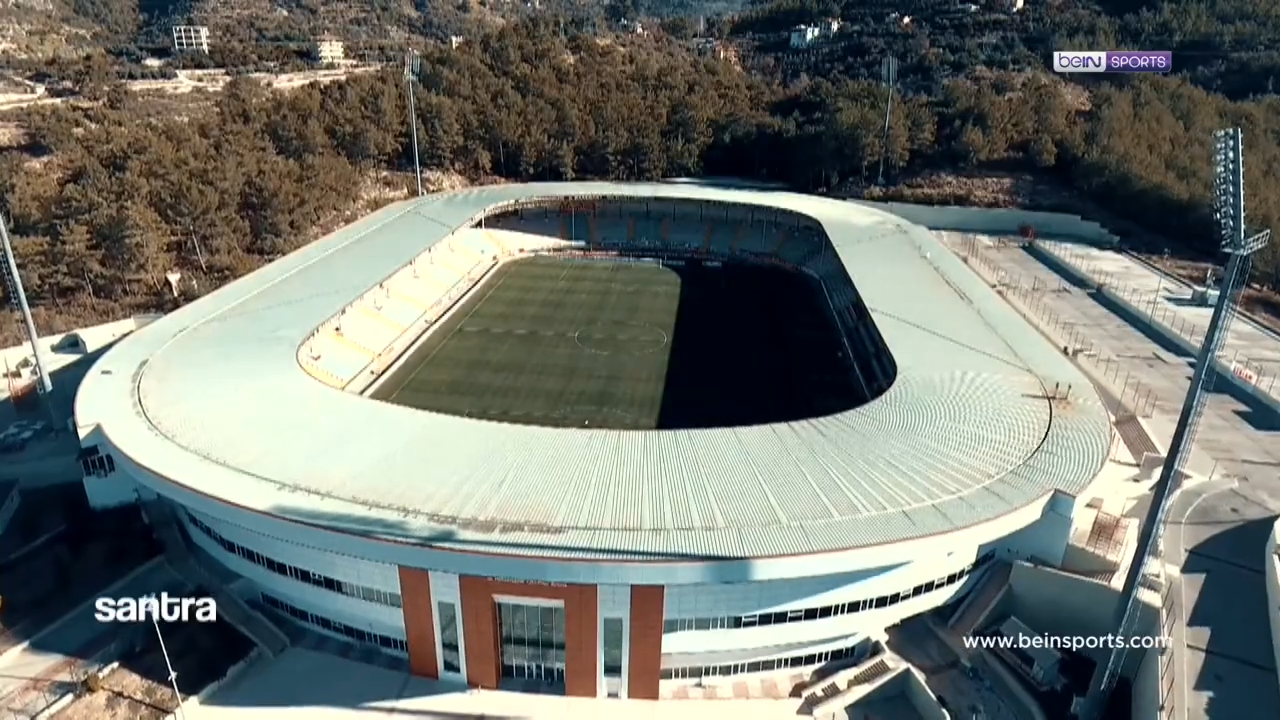

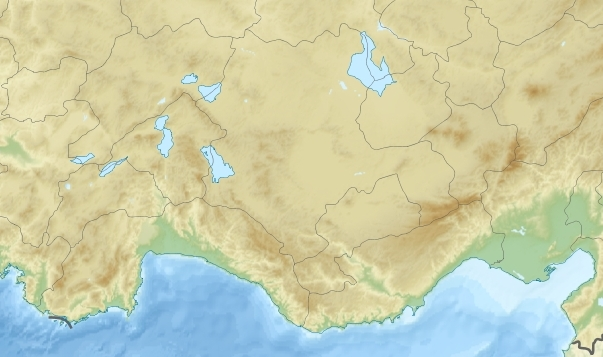
- Location in Southwestern Turkey Location in Turkey
- Location: Alanya, Turkey
- Coordinates: 36.5626°N 32.0792°E
- Capacity: 9,789
- Surface: Grass
- Record attendance: 8,679 (Alanyaspor-Fenerbahçe, 16 September 2019)

Construction
- Groundbreaking: 1995
- Opened: 2011
- Cost: $ 8 million

Tenants
- Alanyaspor (2011–present); Turkey national football team (selected matches)

The Alanya Oba Stadium, formerly known for sponsorship reasons as the Gain Park Stadium (Turkish: Gain Park Stadyumu), is a multi-purpose stadium in Alanya, Turkey. It is currently used mostly for football matches and is the home ground of Süper Lig team Alanyaspor.

The stadium was built in 2011 and its capacity is 9,789.
