= 2014–15 Süper Lig =

57th season of top-tier Turkish football

Süper Lig
- Season: 2014–15
- Champions: Galatasaray (20th title)
- Relegated: Balıkesirspor; Karabükspor; Kayseri Erciyesspor
- Champions League: Galatasaray; Fenerbahçe
- Europa League: Beşiktaş; İstanbul Başakşehir; Trabzonspor
- Matches: 306
- Goals: 873 (2.85 per match)
- Top goalscorer: Fernandão (22 goals)
- Biggest home win: Bursaspor 7–1 Karabükspor
- Biggest away win: Balıkesirspor 0–5 Bursaspor; Konyaspor 0–5 Galatasaray; Gaziantepspor 0–5 Fenerbahçe
- Highest scoring: Trabzonspor 4–4 Gaziantepspor; Balıkesirspor 5–3 Kasımpaşa; Mersin İdman Yurdu 6–2 Kasımpaşa; Kasımpaşa 5–3 Bursaspor; Bursaspor 7–1 Karabükspor
- Longest winning run: Beşiktaş; Fenerbahçe (7 matches)
- Longest unbeaten run: Fenerbahçe (14 matches)
- Longest winless run: Karabükspor; Akhisar Belediyespor (13 matches)
- Longest losing run: Çaykur Rizespor; Kayseri Erciyesspor (6 matches)
- Highest attendance: 52,500; Fenerbahçe 1–0 Galatasaray
- Total attendance: 2,592,980
- Average attendance: 8,474

The 2014–15 Süper Lig, officially called the Spor Toto Süper Lig Süleyman Seba season, was the 57th season of the Süper Lig, the highest tier football league of Turkey.

The season was named after former Beşiktaş club president Süleyman Seba, who died in 2014.

== Teams ==
Elazığspor, Antalyaspor and Kayserispor were relegated at the end of the 2013–14 season after finishing in the bottom three places of the standings. Elazığspor was at top level for two years, while Antalyaspor and Kayserispor were relegated back to the second level after six and ten years, respectively. The relegated teams were replaced by 2013–14 TFF First League champions İstanbul Başakşehir, runners-up Balıkesirspor and play-off winners Mersin İdman Yurdu. They returned to the top division after 1, 38 and 1 years, respectively.

=== Stadia and locations ===
Location of teams in 2014–15 Süper Lig
Istanbul Süper Lig football clubs

Team	Home city	Stadium	Capacity
Akhisar Belediyespor	Manisa	Manisa 19 Mayıs Stadium	16,597
Balıkesirspor	Balıkesir	Balıkesir Atatürk Stadium	15,800
Beşiktaş	Istanbul	Atatürk Olympic Stadium	76,092
Bursaspor	Bursa	Bursa Atatürk Stadium	25,661
Çaykur Rizespor	Rize	Yeni Rize Şehir Stadı	15,485
Eskişehirspor	Eskişehir	Eskişehir Atatürk Stadium	13,520
Fenerbahçe	Istanbul	Şükrü Saracoğlu Stadium	50,509
Galatasaray	Istanbul	Türk Telekom Arena	52,652
Gaziantepspor	Gaziantep	Kamil Ocak Stadium	16,981
Gençlerbirliği	Ankara	Ankara 19 Mayıs Stadium	19,209
İstanbul Başakşehir	Istanbul	Başakşehir Arena	17,800
Karabükspor	Karabük	Dr. Necmettin Şeyhoğlu Stadium	14,200
Kasımpaşa	Istanbul	Recep Tayyip Erdoğan Stadium	14,234
Kayseri Erciyesspor	Kayseri	Kadir Has Stadium	32,864
Konyaspor	Konya	New Konya Stadium	42,276
Mersin İdman Yurdu	Mersin	Mersin Arena	25,534
Sivasspor	Sivas	Sivas 4 Eylül Stadium	14,998
Trabzonspor	Trabzon	Hüseyin Avni Aker Stadium	24,169

=== Personnel and sponsorship ===
Team	Head coach	Captain	Kit manufacturer	Sponsor
Akhisar Belediyespor	(Brazil) Roberto Carlos	(Turkey) Bilal Kısa	Puma	Köfteci Ramiz
Balıkesirspor	(Turkey) Cihat Arslan	(Turkey) Gökhan Ünal	Lescon	
Beşiktaş	(Croatia) Slaven Bilić	(Turkey) Tolga Zengin	Adidas	Vodafone
Bursaspor	(Turkey) Şenol Güneş	(Turkey) Volkan Şen	Puma	
Çaykur Rizespor	(Turkey) Hikmet Karaman	(Turkey) Kıvanç Karakaş	Lotto	Çaykur
Eskişehirspor	(Germany) Michael Skibbe	(Turkey) Sezgin Coşkun	Nike	ETi
Fenerbahçe	(Turkey) İsmail Kartal	(Turkey) Emre Belözoğlu	Adidas	
Galatasaray	(Turkey) Hamza Hamzaoğlu	(Turkey) Selçuk İnan	Nike	Huawei
Gaziantepspor	(Turkey) Okan Buruk	(Turkey) Elyasa Süme	Nike	Turkish Oil
Gençlerbirliği	Vacant	(Turkey) Ramazan Köse	Lotto	ICK
İstanbul Başakşehir	(Turkey) Abdullah Avcı	(Turkey) Rızvan Şahin	Adidas	Makro
Karabükspor	(Turkey) Yılmaz Vural	(Democratic Republic of the Congo) Larrys Mabiala	Adidas	Kardemir
Kasımpaşa	(Turkey) Önder Özen	(Netherlands) Ryan Donk	Adidas	Yesilay
Kayseri Erciyesspor	(Turkey) Fatih Tekke	(Turkey) Necati Ateş	Lescon	Bekas
Konyaspor	(Turkey) Aykut Kocaman	(Turkey) Hasan Kabze	Hummel	Torku
Mersin İdman Yurdu	(Turkey) Rıza Çalımbay	(Turkey) Servet Çetin	Nike	Arbella Makarna
Sivasspor	(Turkey) Sergen Yalçın	(Turkey) Adem Koçak	Adidas	Marka Gida
Trabzonspor	(Turkey) Ersun Yanal	(Turkey) Onur Kıvrak	Nike	

=== Managerial changes ===
Team	Outgoing manager	Manner of departure	Date of vacancy	Replaced by	Date of appointment
Fenerbahçe	(Turkey) Ersun Yanal	Resignation	9 August 2014	(Turkey) İsmail Kartal	12 August 2014
Gençlerbirliği	(Turkey) Mustafa Kaplan	Sacked	13 September 2014	(Turkey) İrfan Buz	24 September 2014
Konyaspor	(Turkey) Mesut Bakkal	Sacked	25 October 2014	(Turkey) Aykut Kocaman	28 October 2014
Trabzonspor	(Bosnia and Herzegovina) Vahid Halilhodžić	Mutual agreement	8 November 2014	(Turkey) Ersun Yanal	12 November 2014
Balıkesirspor	(Turkey) İsmail Ertekin	Resignation	24 November 2014	(Turkey) Kemal Özdeş	30 November 2014
Kayseri Erciyesspor	(Turkey) Bülent Korkmaz	Sacked	25 November 2014	(Turkey) Uğur Tütüneker	7 December 2014
Galatasaray	(Italy) Cesare Prandelli	Sacked	27 November 2014	(Turkey) Hamza Hamzaoğlu	1 December 2014
Çaykur Rizespor	(Turkey) Mehmet Özdilek	Sacked	7 December 2014	(Turkey) Hikmet Karaman	11 December 2014
Sivasspor	(Brazil) Roberto Carlos	Resigned	21 December 2014	(Turkey) Sergen Yalçın	23 December 2014
Akhisar Belediyespor	(Turkey) Mustafa Reşit Akçay	Mutual agreement	29 December 2014	(Brazil) Roberto Carlos	11 January 2015
Eskişehirspor	(Turkey) Ertuğrul Sağlam	Resigned	5 January 2015	(Germany) Michael Skibbe	12 January 2015
Kayseri Erciyesspor	(Turkey) Uğur Tütüneker	Resigned	8 January 2015	(Turkey) Mehmet Özdilek	10 January 2015
Gençlerbirliği	(Turkey) İrfan Buz	Sacked	17 February 2015	(Turkey) Mesut Bakkal	17 February 2015
Karabükspor	(Turkey) Tolunay Kafkas	Mutual agreement	23 February 2015	(Turkey) Yılmaz Vural	24 February 2015
Kasımpaşa	(Georgia (country)) Shota Arveladze	Resigned	13 March 2015	(Netherlands) Jan Wouters (caretaker)	24 March 2015
Kayseri Erciyesspor	(Turkey) Mehmet Özdilek	Resigned	24 March 2015	(Turkey) Fatih Tekke	29 March 2015
Kasımpaşa	(Netherlands) Jan Wouters (caretaker)	Mutual agreement	14 April 2015	(Turkey) Önder Özen	14 April 2015
Balıkesirspor	(Turkey) Kemal Özdeş	Resigned	26 April 2015	(Turkey) Cihat Arslan	27 April 2015
Gençlerbirliği	(Turkey) Mesut Bakkal	Resigned	23 May 2015	(Turkey) Mustafa Kaplan (caretaker)	23 May 2015

=== Foreign players ===
Club	Player 1	Player 2	Player 3	Player 4	Player 5	Player 6	Player 7	Player 8	Former Players
Akhisarspor	(Brazil) Bruno Mezenga	(Brazil) Douglão	(Brazil) Luan Scapolan	(Democratic Republic of the Congo) Lomana LuaLua	(Greece) Theofanis Gekas	(Ivory Coast) Didier Zokora	(Portugal) Custódio	(Portugal) Ricardo Vaz Tê'	(Burundi) Saidi Ntibazonkiza (Cameroon) Arnaud Djoum (Senegal) Ibrahima Sonko
Balıkesirspor	(Bosnia and Herzegovina) Ermin Zec	(Croatia) Andrija Vuković	(Croatia) Ante Kulušić	(Croatia) Tomislav Glumac	(Nigeria) Isaac Promise	(Portugal) André Santos	(Portugal) Vítor Gomes	(Venezuela) Ronald Vargas	(Brazil) Alanzinho (Portugal) Coelho (Sierra Leone) Khalifa Jabbie
Beşiktaş	(Argentina) José Sosa	(Brazil) Ramon	(Canada) Atiba Hutchinson	(Colombia) Pedro Franco	(Czech Republic) Tomáš Sivok	(Ghana) Daniel Opare	(Ivory Coast) Demba Ba	(Sweden) Alexander Milošević	
Bursaspor	(Argentina) Fernando Belluschi	(Argentina) Renato Civelli	(Brazil) Fernandão	(Democratic Republic of the Congo) Cédric Bakambu	(Mali) Bakaye Traoré	(Portugal) Josué	(Sweden) Samuel Holmén		(Nigeria) Taye Taiwo
Çaykur Rizespor	(Cameroon) Léonard Kweuke	(England) Kyle Lafferty	(France) Ludovic Sylvestre	(Iraq) Ali Adnan	(Ivory Coast) Ousmane Viera	(Nigeria) Godfrey Oboabona	(Poland) Ludovic Obraniak	(Slovakia) Filip Hološko	(Democratic Republic of the Congo) Lomana LuaLua (Somalia) Liban Abdi
Eskişehirspor	(Belgium) Ruud Boffin	(Brazil) Diego Ângelo	(Democratic Republic of the Congo) Nzuzi Toko	(Ivory Coast) Ibrahim Sissoko	(Mexico) Rogelio Funes Mori	(Nigeria) Raheem Lawal	(Serbia) Goran Čaušić		(Brazil) Altino (Brazil) Jhonatha
Fenerbahçe	(Brazil) Diego	(Cameroon) Pierre Webó	(Czech Republic) Michal Kadlec	(Netherlands) Dirk Kuyt	(Nigeria) Emmanuel Emenike	(Portugal) Bruno Alves	(Portugal) Raul Meireles	(Senegal) Moussa Sow	
Galatasaray	(Brazil) Alex Telles	(Brazil) Felipe Melo	(Cameroon) Aurélien Chedjou	(Netherlands) Wesley Sneijder	(North Macedonia) Goran Pandev	(Portugal) Bruma	(Switzerland) Blerim Džemaili	(Uruguay) Fernando Muslera	
Gaziantepspor	(Bosnia and Herzegovina) Ognjen Vranješ	(Brazil) Chico	(Brazil) João Vitor	(Guinea) Demba Camara	(Lithuania) Žydrūnas Karčemarskas	(Nigeria) Gbenga Arokoyo	(Nigeria) John Chibuike	(São Tomé and Príncipe) Luís Leal	(Argentina) Lucas Ontivero (Cameroon) Gilles Binya (Honduras) Carlo Costly
Gençlerbirliği	(Belarus) Alexander Hleb	(Guinea) Guy-Michel Landel	(Ivory Coast) Jean-Jacques Gosso	(Morocco) Moestafa El Kabir	(Romania) Bogdan Stancu	(Serbia) Duško Tošić	(Serbia) Nemanja Tomić	(Serbia) Radosav Petrović	(Romania) Liviu Antal (Serbia) Milan Smiljanić (Sweden) Johan Dahlin
İstanbul Başakşehir	(Bosnia and Herzegovina) Edin Višća	(Brazil) Doka Madureira	(Brazil) Márcio Mossoró	(France) Jérémy Perbet	(Moldova) Alexandru Epureanu	(Senegal) Stéphane Badji	(Slovenia) Rajko Rotman		(Nigeria) Michael Eneramo
Karabükspor	(Argentina) Valentín Viola	(Burkina Faso) Abdou Traoré	(Democratic Republic of the Congo) Domi Kumbela	(Democratic Republic of the Congo) Kuca	(Democratic Republic of the Congo) Larrys Mabiala	(Netherlands) Boy Waterman	(Nigeria) Joseph Akpala	(Senegal) Samba Sow	
Kasımpaşa	(Argentina) Óscar Scarione	(Georgia (country)) Lasha Dvali	(Netherlands) Ryan Babel	(Netherlands) Ryan Donk	(Portugal) André Castro	(Sweden) Andreas Isaksson			(Argentina) Matías Fritzler (Ivory Coast) Kafoumba Coulibaly (Uruguay) Tabaré Viudez
Konyaspor	(Angola) Djalma	(Bulgaria) Dimitar Rangelov	(Croatia) Elvis Kokalović	(Portugal) Mário Felgueiras	(Romania) Ciprian Marica	(Romania) Gabriel Torje	(Serbia) Jagoš Vuković	(South Africa) May Mahlangu	(Belarus) Alexander Hleb (Slovenia) Vid Belec
Mersin Talim Yurdu	(Bolivia) Ricardo Pedriel	(Brazil) Welliton	(Bulgaria) Nikolay Mihaylov	(Burkina Faso) Préjuce Nakoulma	(Hungary) Márkó Futács	(Kosovo) Loret Sadiku	(Serbia) Milan Mitrović	(Sweden) Abdul Khalili	
Sivasspor	(Brazil) Cicinho	(Morocco) Aatif Chahechouhe	(Morocco) Manuel da Costa	(Morocco) Mehdi Taouil	(Nigeria) John Utaka	(Nigeria) Michael Eneramo			(Nigeria) Macauley Chrisantus
Trabzonspor	(Algeria) Carl Medjani	(Algeria) Essaïd Belkalem	(Ghana) Majeed Waris	(Guinea) Kévin Constant	(Mali) Mustapha Yatabaré	(Paraguay) Óscar Cardozo	(Portugal) José Bosingwa		(Greece) Avraam Papadopoulos

== League table ==
Pos	Team	Pld	W	D	L	GF	GA	GD	Pts	Qualification or relegation
1	Galatasaray (C)	34	24	5	5	60	35	+25	77	Qualification for the Champions League group stage
2	Fenerbahçe	34	22	8	4	60	29	+31	74	Qualification for the Champions League third qualifying round
3	Beşiktaş	34	21	6	7	55	32	+23	69	Qualification for the Europa League group stage
4	Başakşehir	34	15	14	5	49	30	+19	59	Qualification for the Europa League third qualifying round
5	Trabzonspor	34	15	12	7	58	48	+10	57 (Note: Trabzonspor finished ahead of Bursaspor on head-to-head record: Trabzonspor–Bursaspor 1–0, Bursaspor–Trabzonspor 3–3.)	Qualification for the Europa League second qualifying round
6	Bursaspor (Note: Bursaspor were banned from European competitions by UEFA for the following four seasons due to financial issues.)	34	16	9	9	69	44	+25	57	
7	Mersin İdmanyurdu (Note: Mersin İdmanyurdu, Gaziantepspor, Eskişehirspor, Balıkesirspor, Kasımpaşa and Kayseri Erciyesspor were not granted a UEFA licence by the Turkish Football Federation, and could therefore not qualify for European competitions.)	34	13	8	13	54	48	+6	47	
8	Konyaspor	34	12	10	12	30	39	−9	46	
9	Gençlerbirliği	34	10	10	14	46	44	+2	40 (Note: Gençlerbirliği finished ahead of Gaziantepspor on head-to-head record: Gençlerbirliği–Gaziantepspor 2–0, Gaziantepspor–Gençlerbirliği 0–3.)	
10	Gaziantepspor	34	11	7	16	31	48	−17	40	
11	Eskişehirspor	34	9	12	13	45	52	−7	39	
12	Akhisar Belediyespor	34	9	11	14	41	51	−10	38	
13	Kasımpaşa	34	9	10	15	56	73	−17	37	
14	Çaykur Rizespor	34	9	9	16	41	55	−14	36 (Note: Çaykur Rizespor finished ahead of Sivasspor on head-to-head record: Çaykur Rizespor–Sivasspor 2–1, Sivasspor–Çaykur Rizespor 0–1.)	
15	Sivasspor	34	9	9	16	43	50	−7	36	
16	Kardemir Karabükspor (R)	34	7	7	20	44	64	−20	28	Relegation to TFF First League
17	Kayseri Erciyesspor (R)	34	5	12	17	43	62	−19	27 (Note: Kayseri Erciyesspor finished ahead of Balıkesirspor on head-to-head record: Kayseri Erciyesspor–Balıkesirspor 4–0, Balıkesirspor–Kayseri Erciyesspor 1–1.)	Relegation to TFF First League
18	Balıkesirspor (R)	34	6	9	19	48	69	−21	27	Relegation to TFF First League

Source: Süper Lig
Rules for classification: 1) points; 2) head-to-head points; 3) head-to-head goal difference; 4) goal difference; 5) number of goals scored (It is also decided that only criteria 1, 4 and 5 would be applied to establish the classification during the competition)
(C) Champions; (R) Relegated

== Results ==
Home \ Away	AKH	BAL	BJK	BUR	ÇYR	ESK	FNB	GAL	GAZ	GEN	İBF	KRB	KAS	KER	KON	MİY	SİV	TRA
Akhisar Belediyespor		2–2	1–1	0–1	0–4	2–2	2–0	0–2	3–0	1–1	0–2	5–1	2–0	1–0	0–0	1–1	2–2	1–1
Balıkesirspor	1–2		0–1	0–5	2–2	4–1	0–1	2–0	1–1	0–1	1–2	4–2	5–3	1–1	0–1	1–3	1–3	2–2
Beşiktaş	3–1	2–2		3–2	1–1	1–1	0–2	0–2	1–1	2–1	0–0	2–1	2–0	5–1	0–1	2–1	3–2	3–0
Bursaspor	3–1	4–2	0–1		1–1	2–2	1–1	0–2	2–0	3–1	4–1	7–1	5–1	3–0	0–0	2–1	3–0	3–3
Çaykur Rizespor	3–1	2–2	1–2	0–1		3–0	1–5	1–1	0–1	1–1	0–2	0–3	1–3	1–1	1–1	0–4	2–1	0–2
Eskişehirspor	1–3	2–2	1–0	0–0	1–2		1–1	1–2	1–3	0–2	0–1	1–1	4–1	2–1	2–1	2–0	1–3	2–0
Fenerbahçe	1–2	4–3	1–0	1–0	2–1	2–2		1–0	1–0	2–1	2–0	3–2	2–0	1–1	2–1	1–0	4–1	0–0
Galatasaray	2–1	3–1	2–0	2–2	2–0	0–0	2–1		1–0	1–0	2–2	4–2	2–1	3–1	1–0	3–2	2–1	0–3
Gaziantepspor	1–0	1–0	0–1	1–2	1–2	3–2	0–5	0–1		0–3	0–0	1–0	0–2	2–2	1–1	1–0	1–3	2–0
Gençlerbirliği	0–0	3–1	0–2	1–2	0–2	1–2	2–1	1–1	2–0		1–0	2–2	5–2	0–0	5–0	1–2	0–0	1–1
İstanbul Başakşehir	4–0	1–0	1–2	0–0	3–1	1–1	2–2	4–0	1–0	3–1		2–2	1–1	3–1	0–0	2–2	2–1	1–1
Karabükspor	2–1	0–1	1–2	3–2	2–0	2–2	1–2	1–2	0–0	2–1	0–0		0–0	1–2	0–1	0–2	2–1	3–0
Kasımpaşa	2–2	2–3	1–5	5–3	3–1	1–0	0–3	2–3	4–2	2–2	0–1	2–1		3–3	2–0	2–2	0–0	1–1
Kayseri Erciyesspor	1–2	4–0	3–2	1–1	0–3	0–1	0–1	1–2	0–1	2–4	0–1	4–3	2–5		3–0	2–2	2–3	0–0
Konyaspor	2–1	2–0	1–2	2–3	1–1	1–0	1–1	0–5	2–0	1–0	0–0	1–0	2–1	1–1		2–0	0–1	1–0
Mersin İdman Yurdu	1–1	2–1	0–1	2–1	2–0	4–2	0–1	0–1	0–1	1–1	2–2	2–1	6–2	1–1	3–1		2–0	1–5
Sivasspor	2–0	1–1	0–1	4–1	0–1	1–1	2–3	2–3	1–2	1–0	0–2	2–0	1–1	1–1	0–0	1–2		1–1
Trabzonspor	2–0	3–2	0–2	1–0	3–2	1–4	0–0	2–1	4–4	4–1	3–2	3–2	1–1	2–1	3–2	3–1	3–1	

Source: tff.org (in Turkish)
Legend: Blue = home team win; Yellow = draw; Red = away team win.

== Positions by round ==
The following table represents the teams position after each round in the competition.

Team ╲ Round	1	2	3	4	5	6	7	8	9	10	11	12	13	14	15	16	17	18	19	20	21	22	23	24	25	26	27	28	29	30	31	32	33	34
Galatasaray	1	1	9	5	3	2	5	2	2	3	2	2	2	2	3	3	3	3	3	3	1	1	1	2	1	1	3	2	2	1	1	1	1	1
Fenerbahçe	2	4	2	6	4	5	4	1	1	2	3	3	3	3	2	1	1	1	2	2	3	3	3	3	3	2	1	3	3	2	2	2	2	2
Beşiktaş	6	5	3	2	1	1	1	4	3	1	1	1	1	1	1	2	2	2	1	1	2	2	2	1	2	3	2	1	1	3	3	3	3	3
İstanbul Başakşehir	9	12	11	12	7	7	7	9	11	9	9	6	4	4	4	4	5	4	5	6	4	4	5	5	4	5	4	5	4	4	4	4	4	4
Trabzonspor	12	13	12	13	16	10	12	12	10	6	5	7	5	5	6	6	6	6	6	5	6	6	4	6	5	6	5	6	6	6	5	5	5	5
Bursaspor	18	8	14	8	9	11	8	5	6	5	6	5	7	7	5	5	4	5	4	4	5	5	6	4	6	4	6	4	5	5	6	6	6	6
Mersin İdman Yurdu	17	17	6	4	2	4	2	6	4	4	4	4	6	6	8	9	8	8	8	7	7	7	7	7	8	7	7	7	7	7	7	8	7	7
Konyaspor	16	7	7	9	10	12	15	13	14	12	11	8	11	12	13	12	14	11	10	11	14	13	12	12	10	9	9	8	9	9	8	7	8	8
Gençlerbirliği	8	15	5	3	8	8	11	10	9	10	12	9	9	8	7	8	10	10	11	12	9	10	8	8	9	8	8	9	8	8	9	9	9	9
Gaziantepspor	5	3	8	10	12	9	9	8	5	8	10	12	12	10	10	10	7	7	7	8	8	9	10	9	7	10	10	10	11	10	11	12	11	10
Eskişehirspor	4	6	10	11	13	14	16	16	15	13	14	14	15	15	12	13	13	14	15	14	12	14	13	13	15	15	13	14	14	11	10	10	10	11
Akhisar Belediyespor	3	2	1	1	5	3	3	3	7	7	8	10	10	11	11	11	11	12	13	13	11	11	11	11	12	11	11	11	13	14	12	14	14	12
Kasımpaşa	10	9	4	7	6	6	6	7	8	11	7	11	8	9	9	7	9	9	9	9	10	8	9	10	11	13	14	12	10	12	13	11	12	13
Çaykur Rizespor	7	10	17	17	14	13	10	11	12	14	15	17	17	17	16	16	16	15	16	17	16	16	15	14	13	14	15	15	15	15	15	15	15	14
Sivasspor	15	14	15	16	11	15	17	17	17	16	16	16	16	16	17	17	17	16	12	10	13	12	14	15	14	12	12	13	12	13	14	13	13	15
Karabükspor	13	16	18	18	15	16	13	14	16	17	17	15	14	13	14	14	15	17	17	15	17	17	17	17	17	17	16	16	16	16	16	17	16	16
Kayseri Erciyesspor	11	11	16	14	17	17	14	15	13	15	13	13	13	14	15	15	12	13	14	16	15	15	16	16	16	16	17	17	17	17	17	18	18	17
Balıkesirspor	14	18	13	15	18	18	18	18	18	18	18	18	18	18	18	18	18	18	18	18	18	18	18	18	18	18	18	18	18	18	18	16	17	18

Leader
2015–16 UEFA Champions League Play-off round
2015–16 UEFA Europa League Play-off round
2015–16 UEFA Europa League Third qualifying round
Relegation to 2015–16 TFF First League

Source: tff.org (in Turkish)

== Results by round ==
The following table represents the teams game results in each round.

Team ╲ Round	1	2	3	4	5	6	7	8	9	10	11	12	13	14	15	16	17	18	19	20	21	22	23	24	25	26	27	28	29	30	31	32	33	34
Akhisar Belediyespor	W	D	W	W	L	W	L	D	L	D	D	L	D	L	L	L	D	D	L	W	W	L	D	W	L	W	D	L	L	D	D	L	L	W
Balıkesirspor	L	L	W	L	L	D	L	D	L	L	L	L	L	W	W	D	L	D	L	L	L	D	D	L	W	L	D	D	L	L	W	W	L	D
Beşiktaş	W	D	W	D	W	W	L	L	W	W	W	W	W	W	W	L	W	W	W	W	L	D	W	W	L	D	W	W	W	D	D	L	L	W
Bursaspor	L	W	L	W	L	D	W	W	D	D	D	W	L	D	W	W	W	D	W	L	D	W	D	W	L	W	L	W	L	W	L	W	W	D
Çaykur Rizespor	D	D	L	L	W	D	W	D	L	L	L	L	L	L	W	D	L	W	L	L	D	W	D	W	W	L	L	L	L	L	W	W	D	D
Eskişehirspor	W	D	L	D	L	D	L	D	D	W	D	L	L	D	W	L	D	L	L	W	W	L	D	W	L	L	W	D	D	W	D	W	L	L
Fenerbahçe	W	D	W	L	W	L	W	W	W	D	D	W	W	W	W	W	W	W	D	W	L	D	W	L	W	W	W	D	W	W	D	W	D	W
Galatasaray	W	D	L	W	W	W	L	W	W	L	W	W	W	W	D	W	W	D	W	W	W	W	L	D	W	W	L	W	W	W	W	W	W	D
Gaziantepspor	W	D	L	D	L	W	D	W	W	L	L	L	L	W	L	W	W	L	W	L	L	L	D	W	W	L	D	L	L	D	L	L	W	D
Gençlerbirliği	D	L	W	W	L	D	L	W	D	D	L	W	D	W	D	D	L	L	L	L	W	D	W	W	L	W	L	D	W	D	L	L	L	L
İstanbul Başakşehir	D	D	D	D	W	D	W	L	L	W	D	W	W	W	W	L	D	W	D	L	W	W	D	D	W	D	W	L	D	W	W	W	D	D
Karabükspor	L	D	L	L	W	L	W	L	L	D	L	W	W	D	L	L	L	L	D	D	L	L	D	L	L	L	W	L	W	L	D	L	W	L
Kasımpaşa	D	D	W	D	W	L	W	L	D	L	W	L	W	L	D	W	L	L	L	D	D	W	D	L	L	L	L	W	W	L	L	D	D	L
Kayseri Erciyesspor	D	D	L	D	L	D	W	D	D	L	W	D	D	L	L	L	W	L	L	L	W	L	L	L	L	L	L	D	L	D	D	L	D	W
Konyaspor	L	W	D	D	L	D	L	W	L	W	D	W	L	L	L	D	L	W	W	L	L	D	D	W	W	W	D	W	L	L	W	W	D	D
Mersin İdman Yurdu	L	D	W	W	W	L	W	L	W	D	W	L	D	L	L	D	D	L	W	W	W	L	L	L	L	W	D	W	W	D	L	L	W	D
Sivasspor	L	D	D	L	W	L	L	L	D	W	L	D	L	L	D	W	L	W	W	W	L	D	L	L	W	W	D	L	W	L	L	D	L	D
Trabzonspor	D	D	D	D	L	W	D	D	W	W	W	L	W	D	L	D	W	W	D	W	D	W	W	L	W	L	W	D	L	W	W	L	W	D

W = Win; D = Draw; L = Loss

== Attendances ==
Rank	Team	Matches	Total	Average
1	Galatasaray	17	404,800	23,812
2	Fenerbahçe	17	340,486	20,029
3	Konyaspor	17	323,801	19,047
4	Beşiktaş	17	234,323	13,784
5	Trabzonspor	17	161,697	9,512
6	Bursaspor	17	145,040	8,532
7	Mersin İdman Yurdu	17	122,550	7,209
8	Eskişehirspor	17	95,800	5,635
9	Sivasspor	17	93,980	5,528
10	Balıkesirspor	17	90,700	5,335
11	Akhisar Belediyespor	17	64,450	4,028
12	Karabükspor	17	63,350	3,726
13	Çaykur Rizespor	17	57,000	3,353
14	Gaziantepspor	17	56,950	3,350
15	Gençlerbirliği	17	55,500	3,265
16	Kayseri Erciyesspor	17	48,775	2,869
17	İstanbul Başakşehir	17	45,550	2,679
18	Kasımpaşa	17	39,857	2,345

- Updated to games played on 30 May 2015.
- Source:ntvspor

Notes

1. Galatasaray had a stadium closure punishment for the second week game against Eskişehirspor.

== Statistics ==
=== Top goalscorers ===
As of 30 May 2015

"Süper Lig Top Goalscorers". TFF.
"Süper Lig Top Goalscorers". NTV Spor.

Pos.	Player	Team	Goals
1	(Brazil) Fernandão	Bursaspor	22
2	(Senegal) Demba Ba	Beşiktaş	18
3	(Paraguay) Óscar Cardozo	Trabzonspor	17
4	(Turkey) Burak Yılmaz	Galatasaray	16
5	(Senegal) Moussa Sow	Fenerbahçe	14
6	(Democratic Republic of the Congo) Cédric Bakambu	Bursaspor	13
6	(Morocco) Aatif Chahechouhe	Sivasspor	13
6	(Argentina) Óscar Scarione	Kasimpasa	13
9	(Greece) Theofanis Gekas	Akhisar Belediyespor	12
9	(Cameroon) Leonard Kweuke	Çaykur Rizespor	12
9	(Turkey) Volkan Şen	Bursaspor	12

=== Top assists ===
As of 30 May 2015

"Süper Lig Top Assists". NTV Spor.

Pos.	Player	Team	Assists
1	(Turkey) Mehmet Ekici	Trabzonspor	10
2	(Turkey) Eren Albayrak	Çaykur Rizespor	9
2	(Turkey) Tunay Torun	Kasımpaşa	9
2	(Brazil) Cicinho	Sivasspor	9
5	(Morocco) Moestafa El Kabir	Gençlerbirliği	8
5	(Argentina) José Sosa	Beşiktaş	8
5	(Turkey) Volkan Şen	Bursaspor	8
5	(Turkey) Bilal Kısa	Akhisar Belediyespor	8
5	(Turkey) Caner Erkin	Fenerbahçe	8
5	(Turkey) Sercan Yıldırım	Balıkesirspor	8
5	(Turkey) Selçuk İnan	Galatasaray	8

=== Hat-tricks ===
As of 30 May 2015

Date	Player	For	Against	Result
5 October 2014	Semih Şentürk	İstanbul Başakşehir	Akhisar Belediyespor	4–0
25 October 2014	Cédric Bakambu	Bursaspor	Balıkesirspor	0–5
1 December 2014	Óscar Cardozo	Trabzonspor	Gençlerbirliği	4–1
8 February 2015	Welliton	Mersin İdman Yurdu	Kasımpaşa	6–2
4 April 2015	Moestafa El Kabir	Gençlerbirliği	Kasımpaşa	5–2
9 May 2015	Fernandão^{4}	Bursaspor	Karabükspor	7–1

^{4} Player scored 4 goals.

=== Clean sheets ===
==== Player ====
As of 30 May 2015

Rank	Player	Club	Match Played	Clean sheets
1	Volkan Babacan	İstanbul Başakşehir	34	16
2	Volkan Demirel	Fenerbahçe	26	12
3	Fernando Muslera	Galatasaray	32	11
4	Žydrūnas Karčemarskas	Gaziantepspor	25	9
4	Harun Tekin	Bursaspor	31	9

==== Club ====
- Most clean sheets: 16
  - İstanbul Başakşehir

== Awards ==
=== Annual awards ===
Team of the Season
Goalkeeper	(Uruguay) Fernando Muslera (Galatasaray)			
Defence	(Turkey) Şener Özbayraklı (Bursaspor)	(Turkey) Semih Kaya (Galatasaray)	(Turkey) Serdar Aziz (Bursaspor)	(Turkey) Caner Erkin (Fenerbahçe)
Midfield	(Turkey) Gökhan Töre (Beşiktaş)	(Turkey) Mehmet Ekici (Trabzonspor)	(Turkey) Mehmet Topal (Fenerbahçe)	(Netherlands) Wesley Sneijder (Galatasaray)
Attack	(Brazil) Fernandão (Bursaspor)		(Turkey) Burak Yılmaz (Galatasaray)	

== See also ==
- 2014–15 Turkish Cup
- 2014–15 TFF First League
- 2014–15 TFF Second League
- 2014–15 TFF Third League
