= 2019–20 Süper Lig =

62nd season of top-tier Turkish football

Süper Lig
- Cemil Usta season
- Season: 2019–20
- Dates: 16 August 2019 – 26 July 2020
- Champions: Başakşehir; 1st title
- Relegated: None
- Champions League: Başakşehir; Beşiktaş
- Europa League: Sivasspor; Alanyaspor; Galatasaray
- Matches: 306
- Goals: 875 (2.86 per match)
- Top goalscorer: Alexander Sørloth (24 goals)
- Biggest home win: Trabzonspor 6–0 Kasımpaşa (19 January 2020)
- Biggest away win: Antalyaspor 0–6 Gençlerbirliği (19 October 2019)
- Highest scoring: Trabzonspor 6–2 Kayserispor (28 December 2019)
- Longest winning run: Galatasaray (8 matches)
- Longest unbeaten run: Başakşehir; Trabzonspor (16 matches)
- Longest winless run: Ankaragücü (14 matches)
- Longest losing run: Yeni Malatyaspor (7 matches)
- Highest attendance: 51,663 (Galatasaray 0–0 Fenerbahçe, (28 September 2019)

The 2019–20 Süper Lig, officially called the Süper Lig Cemil Usta season, was the 62nd season of the Süper Lig, the highest tier football league of Turkey. The season was named after Cemil Usta, a former Turkey national team player and Trabzonspor legend. Galatasaray were the defending champions. Due to the coronavirus pandemic, The Ministry of Youth and Sports announced on 12 March 2020 that matches would be played behind closed doors until the end of April, before indefinitely suspending matches altogether on 19 March. After a hiatus of nearly three months, the season resumed behind closed doors on 12 June 2020, with eight rounds still to play. The season ended with matches played on 26 July 2020, and without relegations.

Başakşehir clinched their first league title, on July 20, 2020 with a 1–0 win against Kayserispor, one week to spare.

== Teams ==
A total of 18 teams contested the league, including 15 sides from the 2018–19 season and three promoted from the 2018–19 TFF First League. It included Denizlispor and Gençlerbirliği, the top two teams from the TFF First League, and Gaziantep, the winners of the 2018–19 TFF First League playoffs. Akhisarspor, BB Erzurumspor, and Bursaspor were relegated to the 2019–20 TFF First League. Gençlerbirliği made an immediate return to the top level, Denizlispor returned to it after nine years and Gaziantep made their debut. Erzurum BB were immediately relegated to the second level. Akhisarspor ended seven years at the top level. Bursaspor were relegated after spending 13 years in the top flight. During this period, they were champions of the 2009–10 Süper Lig.

=== Stadiums and locations ===
Location of teams in 2019–20 Süper Lig
Istanbul Province clubs

Team	Home city	Stadium	Capacity
Alanyaspor	Antalya (Alanya)	Bahçeşehir Okulları Stadium	10,130
Ankaragücü	Ankara (Yenimahalle)	Eryaman Stadium	20,071
Antalyaspor	Antalya (Muratpaşa)	Antalya Stadium	32,537
Beşiktaş	Istanbul (Beşiktaş)	Vodafone Park	41,188
Çaykur Rizespor	Rize	Yeni Rize Şehir Stadı	15,332
Denizlispor	Denizli	Denizli Atatürk Stadium	18,745
Fenerbahçe	Istanbul (Kadıköy)	Şükrü Saracoğlu Stadium	47,834
Galatasaray	Istanbul (Sarıyer)	Türk Telekom Stadium	52,223
Gaziantep	Gaziantep	Kalyon Stadium	33,502
Gençlerbirliği	Ankara (Yenimahalle)	Eryaman Stadium	20,071
Göztepe	İzmir	Gürsel Aksel Stadium	25,035
Başakşehir	Istanbul (Başakşehir)	Başakşehir Fatih Terim Stadium	17,300
Kasımpaşa	Istanbul (Beyoğlu)	Recep Tayyip Erdoğan Stadium	14,234
Kayserispor	Kayseri	Kadir Has Stadium	32,864
Konyaspor	Konya	Konya Büyükşehir Stadium	42,000
Sivasspor	Sivas	4 Eylül Stadium	27,532
Trabzonspor	Trabzon	Şenol Güneş Sports Complex	40,782
Yeni Malatyaspor	Malatya	Malatya Stadium	27,044

Göztepe played their matches at the Bornova Stadium half-season.

=== Personnel and sponsorship ===
Team	Head coach	Captain	Kit manufacturer	Sponsor
Alanyaspor	(Turkey) Erol Bulut	(Turkey) Efecan Karaca	Uhlsport	TAV Airports
Ankaragücü	(Turkey) İbrahim Üzülmez	(Turkey) Sedat Ağçay	Nike	Merkez Ankara
Antalyaspor	(Turkey) Tamer Tuna	(Turkey) Yekta Kurtuluş	Nike	Regnum Carya
Beşiktaş	(Turkey) Sergen Yalçın	(Turkey) Burak Yılmaz	Adidas	Vodafone
Çaykur Rizespor	(Turkey) Ünal Karaman	(Turkey) Orhan Ovacıklı	Nike	Çaykur
Denizlispor	(Turkey) Levent Kartop	(Colombia) Hugo Rodallega	Nike	Yukatel
Fenerbahçe	(Turkey) Tahir Karapınar	(Turkey) Emre Belözoğlu	Adidas	Avis
Galatasaray	(Turkey) Fatih Terim	(Turkey) Selçuk İnan	Nike	Terra Pizza
Gaziantep	(Romania) Marius Șumudică	(Turkey) Günay Güvenç	Nike	Sanko
Gençlerbirliği	(Turkey) Hamza Hamzaoğlu	(Benin) Stéphane Sessègnon	Nike	
Göztepe	(Turkey) İlhan Palut	(Portugal) Beto	Puma	Türkerler
Başakşehir	(Turkey) Okan Buruk	(Turkey) Mahmut Tekdemir	Macron	Mall of Istanbul
Kasımpaşa	(Turkey) Fuat Çapa	(Portugal) Ricardo Quaresma	Nike	Ciner
Kayserispor	(Croatia) Robert Prosinečki	(Romania) Silviu Lung Jr.	Nike	İstikbal
Konyaspor	(Turkey) Bülent Korkmaz	(Turkey) Ali Turan	Lotto	Spor Toto
Sivasspor	(Turkey) Rıza Çalımbay	(Turkey) Ziya Erdal	Adidas	Demir İnşaat
Trabzonspor	(Turkey) Hüseyin Çimşir	(Argentina) José Sosa	Macron	Vestel
Yeni Malatyaspor	(Turkey) Hikmet Karaman	(Turkey) Murat Yıldırım	Macron	BtcTurk

=== Managerial changes ===
Team	Outgoing manager	Manner of departure	Date of vacancy	Position in table	Replaced by	Date of appointment
Kasımpaşa	(Turkey) İlyas Öztürk / Erkan Çoker	End of interim period	26 May 2019	Pre-season	(Turkey) İbrahim Üzülmez	1 June 2019
Yeni Malatyaspor	(Turkey) Ali Ravcı	End of interim period	26 May 2019	Pre-season	(Turkey) Sergen Yalçın	9 June 2019
Çaykur Rizespor	(Turkey) Okan Buruk	End of contract	29 May 2019	Pre-season	(Turkey) İsmail Kartal	6 June 2019
Beşiktaş	(Turkey) Şenol Güneş	End of contract	31 May 2019	Pre-season	(Turkey) Abdullah Avcı	1 June 2019
Gençlerbirliği	(Turkey) İbrahim Üzülmez	Resignation	30 May 2019	Pre-season	(Turkey) Mustafa Kaplan	18 June 2019
Başakşehir	(Turkey) Abdullah Avcı	Mutual agreement	30 May 2019	Pre-season	(Turkey) Okan Buruk	10 June 2019
Kasımpaşa	(Turkey) İbrahim Üzülmez	Mutual agreement	1 June 2019	Pre-season	(Turkey) Kemal Özdeş	13 June 2019
Sivasspor	(Turkey) Hakan Keleş	Mutual agreement	1 June 2019	Pre-season	(Turkey) Rıza Çalımbay	7 June 2019
Alanyaspor	(Turkey) Sergen Yalçın	Mutual agreement	4 June 2019	Pre-season	(Turkey) Erol Bulut	6 June 2019
Gaziantep	(Turkey) Mehmet Altıparmak	End of contract	8 June 2019	Pre-season	(Romania) Marius Șumudică	13 June 2019
Ankaragücü	(Turkey) Mustafa Kaplan	Resignation	16 June 2019	Pre-season	(Turkey) Aykan Atik	5 August 2019
Ankaragücü	(Turkey) Aykan Atik	End of interim period	3 September 2019	6th	(Turkey) Metin Diyadin	3 September 2019
Kayserispor	(Turkey) Hikmet Karaman	Mutual agreement	7 October 2019	18th	(Turkey) Samet Aybaba	11 October 2019
Denizlispor	(Turkey) Yücel İldiz	Mutual agreement	8 October 2019	13th	(Turkey) Mehmet Özdilek	11 October 2019
Kayserispor	(Turkey) Samet Aybaba	Resignation	28 October 2019	18th	(Turkey) Bülent Uygun	31 October 2019
Göztepe	(Turkey) Tamer Tuna	Resignation	29 October 2019	15h	(Turkey) İlhan Palut	4 November 2019
Gençlerbirliği	(Turkey) Mustafa Kaplan	Mutual agreement	29 October 2019	17th	(Turkey) Hamza Hamzaoğlu	31 October 2019
Ankaragücü	(Turkey) Metin Diyadin	Mutual agreement	11 November 2019	17th	(Turkey) Mustafa Kaplan	12 November 2019
Antalyaspor	(Turkey) Bülent Korkmaz	Mutual agreement	12 November 2019	15th	(Croatia) Stjepan Tomas	15 November 2019
Kasımpaşa	(Turkey) Kemal Özdeş	Mutual agreement	1 December 2019	15th	(Turkey) Tayfur Havutçu	4 December 2019
Kayserispor	(Turkey) Bülent Uygun	Mutual agreement	26 December 2019	18th	(Croatia) Robert Prosinečki	29 December 2019
Trabzonspor	(Turkey) Ünal Karaman	Mutual agreement	29 December 2019	3rd	(Turkey) Hüseyin Çimşir	2 January 2020
Antalyaspor	(Croatia) Stjepan Tomas	Mutual agreement	31 December 2019	16th	(Turkey) Tamer Tuna	4 January 2020
Yeni Malatyaspor	(Turkey) Sergen Yalçın	Mutual agreement	15 January 2020	8th	(Turkey) Kemal Özdeş	23 January 2020
Kasımpaşa	(Turkey) Tayfur Havutçu	Resignation	19 January 2020	15th	(Turkey) Fuat Çapa	5 February 2020
Ankaragücü	(Turkey) Mustafa Kaplan	Mutual agreement	21 January 2020	17th	(Turkey) Mustafa R. Akçay	27 January 2020
Beşiktaş	(Turkey) Abdullah Avcı	Sacked	24 January 2020	7th	(Turkey) Sergen Yalçın	29 January 2020
Konyaspor	(Turkey) Aykut Kocaman	Mutual agreement	9 February 2020	14th	(Turkey) Bülent Korkmaz	12 February 2020
Denizlispor	(Turkey) Mehmet Özdilek	Mutual agreement	16 February 2020	11th	(Turkey) Bülent Uygun	21 February 2020
Çaykur Rizespor	(Turkey) İsmail Kartal	Resignation	29 February 2020	14th	(Turkey) Ünal Karaman	3 March 2020
Fenerbahçe	(Turkey) Ersun Yanal	Mutual agreement	1 March 2020	7th	(Turkey) Tahir Karapınar (interim)	9 June 2020
Yeni Malatyaspor	(Turkey) Kemal Özdeş	Mutual agreement	1 March 2020	13th	(Turkey) Hikmet Karaman	3 March 2020
Ankaragücü	(Turkey) Mustafa R. Akçay	Mutual agreement	23 June 2020	18th	(Turkey) İbrahim Üzülmez	24 June 2020
Denizlispor	(Turkey) Bülent Uygun	Mutual agreement	4 July 2020	12th	(Turkey) Levent Kartop (interim)	5 July 2020
Çaykur Rizespor	(Turkey) Ünal Karaman	Resignation	14 July 2020	15th	(Croatia) Stjepan Tomas	2020–21 season
Trabzonspor	(Turkey) Hüseyin Çimşir	Mutual agreement	20 July 2020	2nd	(England) Eddie Newton (interim)	20 July 2020

== League table ==
Pos	Team	Pld	W	D	L	GF	GA	GD	Pts	Qualification or relegation
1	Başakşehir (C)	34	20	9	5	65	34	+31	69	Qualification for the Champions League group stage
2	Trabzonspor (Note: Trabzonspor were banned for 1 season from all UEFA club competitions for either the 2020–21 or 2021–22 seasons by the UEFA Club Financial Control Body on 3 June 2020 due to breaches of the UEFA Financial Fair Play Regulations.)	34	18	11	5	76	42	+34	65	
3	Beşiktaş	34	19	5	10	59	40	+19	62	Qualification for the Champions League second qualifying round
4	Sivasspor	34	17	9	8	55	38	+17	60	Qualification for the Europa League group stage
5	Alanyaspor	34	16	9	9	61	37	+24	57	Qualification for the Europa League third qualifying round
6	Galatasaray	34	15	11	8	55	37	+18	56	Qualification for the Europa League second qualifying round
7	Fenerbahçe	34	15	8	11	58	46	+12	53	
8	Gaziantep	34	11	13	10	49	50	−1	46	
9	Antalyaspor	34	11	12	11	41	52	−11	45	
10	Kasımpaşa	34	12	7	15	53	58	−5	43	
11	Göztepe	34	11	9	14	44	49	−5	42	
12	Gençlerbirliği	34	9	9	16	39	56	−17	36 (Note: Head-to-head points: Gençlerbirliği 4, Konyaspor 1)	
13	Konyaspor	34	8	12	14	36	52	−16	36	
14	Denizlispor	34	9	8	17	31	48	−17	35 (Note: Head-to-head points: Denizlispor 4, Rizespor 1)	
15	Rizespor	34	10	5	19	38	57	−19	35	
16	Yeni Malatyaspor	34	8	8	18	44	51	−7	32 (Note: Head-to-head points: Yeni Malatyaspor 6, Kayserispor 5, Ankaragücü 5. Head-to-head goal difference: Yeni Malatyaspor +6, Kayserispor -3, Ankaragücü -3. Head-to-head goals scored: Yeni Malatyaspor 9, Kayserispor 4, Ankaragücü 3.)	
17	Kayserispor	34	8	8	18	40	72	−32	32	
18	Ankaragücü	34	7	11	16	31	56	−25	32	

Source: Süper Lig, Soccerway
Rules for classification: 1) Points; 2) Head-to-head points; 3) Head-to-head goal difference; 4) Head-to-head goals scored; 5) Goal difference; 6) Goals scored; 7) Play-off.
(C) Champions

== Results ==
Home \ Away	ALA	AGÜ	ANT	BJK	ÇYR	DEN	FNB	GAL	GFK	GEN	GÖZ	İBF	KAS	KAY	KON	SİV	TRA	YMS
Alanyaspor	—	5–0	0–0	1–2	5–2	1–0	3–1	4–1	1–0	0–1	0–1	0–0	4–1	5–1	2–1	1–1	2–2	2–1
Ankaragücü	1–4	—	0–1	0–0	2–1	2–2	2–1	1–0	1–2	2–1	1–3	1–2	1–1	1–1	0–1	0–3	0–3	0–4
Antalyaspor	1–0	2–2	—	1–2	3–1	0–2	2–2	2–2	1–1	0–6	0–3	0–2	3–1	2–2	0–0	1–0	1–3	3–0
Beşiktaş	2–0	2–1	1–2	—	1–1	1–0	2–0	1–0	3–0	4–1	3–0	1–1	3–2	4–1	3–0	1–2	2–2	0–2
Rizespor	1–1	2–0	1–0	1–2	—	2–2	1–2	2–0	1–2	2–0	0–0	1–2	0–3	3–2	3–1	2–1	1–2	3–0
Denizlispor	1–5	0–1	0–3	1–5	2–0	—	1–2	2–0	0–1	1–0	1–1	1–1	0–1	0–1	0–1	0–2	2–1	2–0
Fenerbahçe	1–1	2–1	0–1	3–1	3–1	2–2	—	1–3	5–0	5–2	2–1	2–0	3–2	2–1	5–1	1–2	1–1	3–2
Galatasaray	1–0	2–2	5–0	0–0	2–0	2–1	0–0	—	3–3	3–0	3–1	0–1	1–0	4–1	1–1	3–2	1–3	1–0
Gaziantep	1–1	1–1	1–1	3–2	2–0	1–2	0–2	0–2	—	4–1	1–1	1–2	2–2	3–0	3–1	5–1	1–1	1–1
Gençlerbirliği	1–1	1–0	1–1	0–3	0–1	0–2	1–1	0–0	1–0	—	3–1	1–2	0–2	2–1	2–1	2–2	0–2	3–3
Göztepe	3–3	2–2	0–1	2–1	2–0	0–0	2–2	2–1	1–1	1–3	—	0–3	1–4	4–0	1–0	3–1	1–3	1–1
Başakşehir	2–0	2–1	2–0	1–0	5–0	2–0	1–2	1–1	3–1	3–1	2–1	—	5–1	1–0	1–1	1–1	2–2	4–1
Kasımpaşa	1–2	0–1	3–0	2–3	2–0	2–0	2–0	0–3	3–4	1–2	2–0	3–2	—	5–1	1–4	0–0	1–1	2–2
Kayserispor	0–1	1–1	2–2	3–1	1–0	1–1	1–0	2–3	1–1	2–0	1–0	1–4	1–1	—	2–2	1–4	1–2	2–1
Konyaspor	2–3	0–0	2–2	0–1	1–0	0–0	1–0	0–3	0–0	1–1	1–3	4–3	0–0	2–1	—	2–2	0–1	0–2
Sivasspor	1–0	3–1	2–1	3–0	1–1	1–0	3–1	2–2	1–1	2–0	1–0	1–1	2–0	0–2	2–0	—	2–1	0–1
Trabzonspor	1–0	1–1	2–2	4–1	5–2	1–2	2–1	1–1	4–1	2–2	0–1	1–1	6–0	6–2	3–4	2–1	—	2–1
Yeni Malatyaspor	2–3	0–1	1–2	0–1	0–2	5–1	0–0	1–1	0–1	0–0	2–1	3–0	1–2	4–0	1–1	1–3	1–3	—

Source: Turkish Football Federation (in Turkish)
Legend: Blue = home team win; Yellow = draw; Red = away team win.
For upcoming matches, an "a" indicates there is an article about the rivalry between the two participants.

== Statistics ==
=== Top goalscorers ===
Rank	Player	Club(s)	Goals
1	(Norway) Alexander Sørloth	Trabzonspor	24
2	(Senegal) Papiss Cissé	Alanyaspor	22
3	(North Macedonia) Adis Jahović	Yeni Malatyaspor/Antalyaspor	17
4	(Kosovo) Vedat Muriqi	Fenerbahçe	15
5	(Romania) Bogdan Stancu	Gençlerbirliği	14
6	(Senegal) Demba Ba	Başakşehir	13
6	(Bosnia and Herzegovina) Edin Višća	Başakşehir	13
6	(Mali) Mustapha Yatabaré	Sivasspor	13
6	(Turkey) Burak Yılmaz	Beşiktaş	13
10	(Guinea) Bengali-Fodé Koita	Kasımpaşa	12

=== Top assists ===
Rank	Player	Club(s)	Assists
1	(Bosnia and Herzegovina) Edin Višća	Başakşehir	12
2	(Turkey) Ömer Bayram	Galatasaray	10
2	(Turkey) Caner Erkin	Beşiktaş	10
4	(Bosnia and Herzegovina) Haris Hajradinović	Kasımpaşa	8
4	(Ghana) Bernard Mensah	Kayserispor	8
4	(Norway) Alexander Sørloth	Trabzonspor	8
7	(Turkey) Soner Aydoğdu	Göztepe	7
7	(Brazil) Guilherme	Yeni Malatyaspor/Trabzonspor	7
7	(Argentina) José Ernesto Sosa	Trabzonspor	7
7	(Turkey) Burak Yılmaz	Beşiktaş	7

=== Hat-tricks ===
Date	Player	For	Against	Result
4 October 2019	(North Macedonia) Adis Jahović^{4}	Yeni Malatyaspor	Denizlispor	5–1 (H)
19 October 2019	(Portugal) Daniel Candeias	Gençlerbirliği	Antalyaspor	6–0 (A)
30 November 2019	(Angola) Djalma	Antalyaspor	Ankaragücü	5–0 (H)
19 January 2020	(Norway) Alexander Sørloth	Trabzonspor	Kasımpaşa	6–0 (H)

^{4} Player scored four goals

== Awards ==
=== Annual awards ===
Award	Winner	Club
Player of the Season	(Turkey) Abdülkadir Ömür	Trabzonspor
Goalkeeper of the Season	(Turkey) Uğurcan Çakır	Trabzonspor
Defender of the Season	(Brazil) Marcão	Galatasaray
Midfielder of the Season	(Turkey) Ozan Tufan	Fenerbahçe
Forward of the Season	(Norway) Alexander Sørloth	Trabzonspor
Manager of the Season	(Turkey) Okan Buruk	Başakşehir

Team of the Year
Goalkeeper	(Uruguay) Fernando Muslera (Galatasaray)			
Defenders	(Turkey) Caner Erkin (Beşiktaş)	(Portugal) João Pereira (Trabzonspor)	(Turkey) Caner Osmanpaşa (Sivasspor)	(England) Steven Caulker (Alanyaspor)
Midfielders	(Turkey) Ömer Bayram (Galatasaray)	(Canada) Atiba Hutchinson (Beşiktaş)	(Turkey) Mert Hakan Yandaş (Sivasspor)	(Bosnia and Herzegovina) Edin Višća (İstanbul Başakşehir)
Forwards	(Nigeria) Anthony Nwakaeme (Trabzonspor)	(Norway) Alexander Sørloth (Trabzonspor)		
