= 2018–19 Süper Lig =

61st season of top-tier Turkish football

Turkish Süper Lig
- Season: 2018–19
- Dates: 10 August 2018 – 26 May 2019
- Champions: Galatasaray; 22nd title
- Relegated: Akhisarspor; Bursaspor; Erzurum BB
- Champions League: Galatasaray; İstanbul Başakşehir
- Europa League: Beşiktaş; Trabzonspor; Yeni Malatyaspor
- Matches: 306
- Goals: 821 (2.68 per match)
- Top goalscorer: Mbaye Diagne (30 goals)
- Longest winning run: Beşiktaş (6 matches)
- Longest unbeaten run: Galatasaray (19 matches)
- Longest winless run: Ankaragücü; Kasımpaşa (6 matches)
- Longest losing run: Konyaspor (11 matches)
- Highest attendance: 51,578 (Galatasaray 2–0 Beşiktaş, (5 May 2019)

The 2018–19 Süper Lig, officially called the Spor Toto Süper Lig Lefter Küçükandonyadis season, was the 61st season of the Süper Lig, the highest tier football league of Turkey. The season began on 10 August 2018 and concluded on 26 May 2019.

The season was named after Lefter Küçükandonyadis, a former Turkey national team player and Fenerbahçe legend.

This season the VAR was introduced in all games of Süper Lig competition.

== Teams ==
A total of 18 teams contest the league, including 15 sides from the 2017–18 season and three promoted from the 2017–18 TFF First League. It includes Rizespor and Ankaragücü, the two top teams from the TFF First League, and Erzurum BB, the winners of the 2017–18 TFF First League playoffs. Gençlerbirliği, Osmanlıspor, and Karabükspor were relegated to 2018–19 TFF First League.

=== Stadiums and locations ===
Location of teams in 2018–19 Süper Lig
Istanbul Süper Lig football clubs

Team	Home city	Stadium	Capacity
Akhisarspor	Manisa (Akhisar)	Spor Toto Akhisar Stadium	12,139
Alanyaspor	Antalya (Alanya)	Bahçeşehir Okulları Stadium	10,130
Ankaragücü	Ankara	Eryaman Stadium	20,071
Antalyaspor	Antalya (Muratpaşa)	Antalya Stadium	32,537
Beşiktaş	Istanbul (Beşiktaş)	Vodafone Park	41,188
Bursaspor	Bursa	Büyüksehir Belediyesi Stadium	43,361
Çaykur Rizespor	Rize	Yeni Rize Şehir Stadı	15,332
Erzurum BB	Erzurum	Kazım Karabekir Stadium	23,277
Fenerbahçe	Istanbul (Kadıköy)	Şükrü Saracoğlu Stadium	47,834
Galatasaray	Istanbul (Şişli)	Türk Telekom Stadium	52,223
Göztepe	İzmir	Bornova Stadium	12,500
İstanbul Başakşehir	Istanbul (Başakşehir)	Başakşehir Fatih Terim Stadium	17,300
Kasımpaşa	Istanbul (Beyoğlu)	Recep Tayyip Erdoğan Stadium	14,234
Kayserispor	Kayseri	Kadir Has Stadium	32,864
Konyaspor	Konya	Konya Büyükşehir Stadium	42,000
Sivasspor	Sivas	4 Eylül Stadium	27,532
Trabzonspor	Trabzon	Şenol Güneş Sports Complex	40,782
Yeni Malatyaspor	Malatya	Malatya Stadium	27,044

=== Personnel and sponsorship ===
Team	Head coach	Captain	Kit manufacturer	Sponsor
Akhisarspor	(Turkey) Cem Kavçak	(Turkey) Bilal Kısa	Nike	
Alanyaspor	(Turkey) Sergen Yalçın	(Turkey) Haydar Yılmaz	Uhlsport	TAV Airports
Ankaragücü	(Turkey) Mustafa Kaplan	(Turkey) Sedat Ağçay	Puma	
Antalyaspor	(Turkey) Bülent Korkmaz	(Brazil) Diego Ângelo	Nike	
Atiker Konyaspor	(Turkey) Aykut Kocaman	(Turkey) Ali Turan	Nike	Spor Toto
Beşiktaş	(Turkey) Şenol Güneş	(Turkey) Tolga Zengin	Adidas	Vodafone
Bursaspor	(Turkey) Mesut Bakkal	(Turkey) Ertuğrul Ersoy	Puma	BUDO
Çaykur Rizespor	(Turkey) Okan Buruk	(Turkey) Ali Çamdalı	Nike	Çaykur
Erzurum BB	(Turkey) Hamza Hamzaoğlu	(Turkey) Egemen Korkmaz	Nike	Anka Jeneratör
Fenerbahçe	(Turkey) Ersun Yanal	(Turkey) Volkan Demirel	Adidas	Avis
Galatasaray	(Turkey) Fatih Terim	(Turkey) Selçuk İnan	Nike	Nef
Göztepe	(Turkey) Tamer Tuna	(Portugal) Beto	Puma	Mahall Bomonti
İstanbul Başakşehir	(Turkey) Abdullah Avcı	(Turkey) Emre Belözoğlu	Macron	Decovita
Kasımpaşa	(Turkey) Mustafa Denizli	(Turkey) Veysel Sarı	Nike	Ciner
Kayserispor	(Turkey) Hikmet Karaman	(Turkey) Umut Bulut	Nike	İstikbal
Sivasspor	(Turkey) Hakan Keleş	(Turkey) Ziya Erdal	Adidas	Demir İnşaat
Trabzonspor	(Turkey) Ünal Karaman	(Argentina) José Sosa	Macron	QNB
Yeni Malatyaspor	(Turkey) Ali Ravcı	(Turkey) Adem Büyük	Macron	Battalbey

=== Managerial changes ===
Team	Outgoing manager	Manner of departure	Date of vacancy	Position in table	Replaced by	Date of appointment
Trabzonspor	(Turkey) Rıza Çalımbay	End of contract	17 May 2018	5th	(Turkey) Ünal Karaman	30 May 2018
Bursaspor	(Turkey) Mustafa Er	Change of staff role	17 May 2018	13th	(Turkey) Samet Aybaba	19 May 2018
Sivasspor	(Turkey) Samet Aybaba	Resignation	19 May 2018	7th	(Turkey) Tamer Tuna	29 May 2018
Antalyaspor	(Turkey) Hamza Hamzaoğlu	Mutual agreement	21 May 2018	14th	(Turkey) Bülent Korkmaz	9 June 2018
Göztepe	(Turkey) Tamer Tuna	Mutual agreement	22 May 2018	6th	(Turkey) Bayram Bektaş	24 May 2018
Akhisarspor	(Turkey) Okan Buruk	End of contract	14 June 2018	11th	(Bosnia and Herzegovina) Safet Sušić	21 June 2018
Fenerbahçe	(Turkey) Aykut Kocaman	Mutual agreement	18 June 2018	2nd	(Netherlands) Phillip Cocu	22 June 2018
Akhisarspor	(Bosnia and Herzegovina) Safet Sušić	Sacked	17 September 2018	17th	(Turkey) Cihat Arslan	25 September 2018
Çaykur Rizespor	(Turkey) İbrahim Üzülmez	Mutual agreement	21 September 2018	16th	(Turkey) Okan Buruk	24 September 2018
BB Erzurumspor	(Turkey) Mehmet Altıparmak	Mutual agreement	26 September 2018	18th	(Turkey) Mehmet Özdilek	1 October 2018
Kasımpaşa	(Turkey) Kemal Özdeş	Resignation	1 October 2018	6th	(Turkey) Mustafa Denizli	2 October 2018
Fenerbahçe	(Netherlands) Phillip Cocu	Sacked	28 October 2018	15th	(Turkey) Ersun Yanal	14 December 2018
Sivasspor	(Turkey) Tamer Tuna	Resignation	6 November 2018	14th	(Turkey) Hakan Keleş	19 November 2018
Alanyaspor	(Turkey) Mesut Bakkal	Mutual agreement	6 November 2018	13th	(Turkey) Sergen Yalçın	9 November 2018
Konyaspor	(Turkey) Rıza Çalımbay	Sacked	12 November 2018	9th	(Turkey) Aykut Kocaman	19 November 2018
Kayserispor	(Turkey) Ertuğrul Sağlam	Resignation	2 December 2018	17th	(Turkey) Hikmet Karaman	5 December 2018
Göztepe	(Turkey) Bayram Bektaş	Resignation	9 December 2018	12th	(Turkey) Kemal Özdeş	10 December 2018
Ankaragücü	(Turkey) İsmail Kartal	Sacked	15 December 2018	11th	(Turkey) Bayram Bektaş	19 December 2018
Ankaragücü	(Turkey) Bayram Bektaş	Resignation	13 January 2019	12th	(Turkey) Mustafa Kaplan	14 January 2019
Akhisarspor	(Turkey) Cihat Arslan	Sacked	14 February 2019	18th	(Turkey) Cem Kavçak	15 February 2019
Göztepe	(Turkey) Kemal Özdeş	Sacked	24 February 2019	13th	(Turkey) Tamer Tuna	26 February 2019
BB Erzurumspor	(Turkey) Mehmet Özdilek	Mutual agreement	4 March 2019	17th	(Turkey) Hamza Hamzaoğlu	5 March 2019
Bursaspor	(Turkey) Samet Aybaba	Mutual agreement	7 April 2019	15th	(Turkey) Mesut Bakkal	8 April 2019
Yeni Malatyaspor	(Turkey) Erol Bulut	Resignation	28 April 2019	7th	(Turkey) Ali Ravcı	29 April 2019
Kasımpaşa	(Turkey) Mustafa Denizli	Resignation	14 May 2019	13th	(Turkey) İlyas Öztürk / Erkan Çoker	14 May 2019

=== Foreign players ===
Club	Player 1	Player 2	Player 3	Player 4	Player 5	Player 6	Player 7	Player 8	Player 9	Player 10	Player 11	Player 12	Player 13	Player 14	Former Players
Akhisarspor	(Albania) Sokol Cikalleshi	(Bosnia and Herzegovina) Avdija Vršajević	(Bosnia and Herzegovina) Edin Cocalić	(Brazil) Serginho	(Cameroon) Dany Nounkeu	(Democratic Republic of the Congo) Jeremy Bokila	(France) Abdoul Sissoko	(Morocco) Adrien Regattin	(Netherlands) Elvis Manu	(Portugal) Hélder Barbosa	(Portugal) Josué	(Portugal) Miguel Lopes	(Serbia) Milan Lukač	(Slovenia) Rajko Rotman	(Sweden) Daniel Larsson (Ukraine) Yevhen Seleznyov
Alanyaspor	(Angola) Djalma	(Argentina) Lucas Villafáñez	(Brazil) Baiano	(Brazil) Welinton	(Cameroon) Mbilla Etame	(Chile) Junior Fernandes	(Czech Republic) Josef Šural	(Democratic Republic of the Congo) Fabrice Nsakala	(Ghana) Isaac Sackey	(Greece) Georgios Tzavellas	(Netherlands) Glynor Plet	(Nigeria) Joel Obi	(Senegal) Papiss Cissé	(Sierra Leone) Steven Caulker	(Brazil) Bobô (Brazil) Filipe Augusto (Greece) Giannis Maniatis
Ankaragücü	(Argentina) Óscar Scarione	(Argentina) Héctor Canteros	(Croatia) Ante Kulušić	(France) Thibault Moulin	(Democratic Republic of the Congo) Wilfred Moke	(Greece) Stelios Kitsiou	(Ivory Coast) Brice Dja Djédjé	(Jamaica) Dever Orgill	(Mali) Hadi Sacko	(Poland) Michał Pazdan	(Portugal) Tiago Pinto	(Russia) Zaur Sadayev	(Senegal) Ricardo Faty	(United States) Tyler Boyd	(Belarus) Anton Putsila (Burkina Faso) Bakary Koné (France) Thomas Heurtaux (Italy) Alessio Cerci (Morocco) Moestafa El Kabir (Morocco) Youness Mokhtar (Nigeria) Lanre Kehinde (Poland) Łukasz Szukała (Republic of the Congo) Thievy Bifouma (Sweden) Johannes Hopf
Antalyaspor	(Angola) Fredy	(Belgium) Ruud Boffin	(Brazil) Amilton	(Brazil) Charles	(Brazil) Chico	(Brazil) Diego Ângelo	(Czech Republic) Ondřej Čelůstka	(France) Aly Cissokho	(Ivory Coast) Jean Armel Drolé	(Mauritania) Souleymane Doukara					(Brazil) Danilo (Brazil) Maicon (France) William Vainqueur (Morocco) Abdelaziz Barrada
Beşiktaş	(Brazil) Adriano	(Canada) Atiba Hutchinson	(Canada) Cyle Larin	(Chile) Enzo Roco	(Chile) Gary Medel	(Croatia) Domagoj Vida	(France) Nicolas Isimat-Mirin	(Germany) Loris Karius	(Japan) Shinji Kagawa	(Netherlands) Jeremain Lens	(Portugal) Ricardo Quaresma	(Serbia) Adem Ljajić			(Brazil) Vágner Love (Netherlands) Ryan Babel (Portugal) Pepe (Spain) Álvaro Negredo
Bursaspor	(Argentina) Santiago Vergini	(Brazil) Allano	(Cameroon) Aurélien Chedjou	(Democratic Republic of the Congo) Jirès Kembo Ekoko	(Nigeria) Shehu Abdullahi	(North Macedonia) Jani Atanasov	(Romania) Iasmin Latovlevici	(Senegal) Diafra Sakho	(Senegal) Henri Saivet	(Senegal) Stéphane Badji					(Czech Republic) Tomáš Necid (Nigeria) Paschal Okoli (Nigeria) William Troost-Ekong (Romania) Bogdan Stancu
Çaykur Rizespor	(Brazil) Fernando Boldrin	(Burkina Faso) Préjuce Nakoulma	(Croatia) Dario Melnjak	(Italy) Davide Petrucci	(Morocco) Aatif Chahechouhe	(Morocco) Marwane Saâdane	(Morocco) Mohamed Abarhoun	(Nigeria) Aminu Umar	(Nigeria) Azubuike Okechukwu	(Nigeria) Chidozie Awaziem	(Paraguay) Braian Samudio	(Tunisia) Montassar Talbi	(Ukraine) Mykola Morozyuk		(Czech Republic) Jakub Brabec (Kosovo) Samir Ujkani (Poland) Jarosław Jach (Senegal) Armand Traoré (Slovenia) Matic Fink (Ukraine) Oleksandr Hladkyi
Erzurum BB	(Bosnia and Herzegovina) Ibrahim Šehić	(Bosnia and Herzegovina) Jasmin Šćuk	(France) Gabriel Obertan	(France) Léo Schwechlen	(France) Rashad Muhammed	(Denmark) Pierre Kanstrup	(Ivory Coast) Moussa Koné	(Nigeria) Samuel Eduok	(Norway) Kristian Opseth	(South Africa) Siphiwe Tshabalala	(Switzerland) Ridge Munsy	(Togo) Gilles Sunu			(Brazil) Auremir (Germany) Lennart Thy (Ivory Coast) Stephane Acka (Russia) Arsen Khubulov (Serbia) Jasmin Trtovac
Fenerbahçe	(Algeria) Islam Slimani	(Algeria) Yassine Benzia	(Brazil) Jailson	(Cameroon) Carlos Kameni	(Chile) Mauricio Isla	(France) Mathieu Valbuena	(Ghana) André Ayew	(Morocco) Nabil Dirar	(Nigeria) Victor Moses	(Russia) Roman Neustädter	(Slovakia) Martin Škrtel	(Slovenia) Miha Zajc	(Spain) Roberto Soldado	(Switzerland) Michael Frey	(Brazil) Giuliano (Brazil) Souza (Mexico) Diego Reyes (Morocco) Aatif Chahechouhe
Galatasaray	(Algeria) Sofiane Feghouli	(Brazil) Fernando	(Brazil) Marcão	(Brazil) Mariano	(Democratic Republic of the Congo) Christian Luyindama	(Greece) Kostas Mitroglou	(Japan) Yuto Nagatomo	(Morocco) Younès Belhanda	(Netherlands) Ryan Donk	(Nigeria) Henry Onyekuru	(Norway) Martin Linnes	(Senegal) Badou Ndiaye	(Senegal) Mbaye Diagne	(Uruguay) Fernando Muslera	(Brazil) Maicon (Cape Verde) Garry Rodrigues (France) Bafétimbi Gomis
Göztepe	(Algeria) Nabil Ghilas	(Brazil) Kadu	(Brazil) Titi	(Brazil) Wallace	(Costa Rica) Celso Borges	(England) Cameron Jerome	(France) Axel Ngando	(France) Yoan Gouffran	(Gabon) André Poko	(Ghana) Lumor Agbenyenu	(Ivory Coast) Adama Traoré	(Portugal) André Castro	(Portugal) Beto	(Senegal) Lamine Gassama	(Albania) Sokol Cikalleshi
İstanbul Başakşehir	(Bosnia and Herzegovina) Edin Višća	(Bosnia and Herzegovina) Riad Bajić	(Brazil) Júnior Caiçara	(Brazil) Márcio Mossoró	(Brazil) Robinho	(France) Gaël Clichy	(Ghana) Joseph Attamah	(Italy) Stefano Napoleoni	(Moldova) Alexandru Epureanu	(Netherlands) Eljero Elia	(Russia) Fyodor Kudryashov	(Senegal) Demba Ba	(Serbia) Miloš Jojić	(Togo) Emmanuel Adebayor	(Egypt) Karim Hafez (Morocco) Manuel da Costa
Kasımpaşa	(Bosnia and Herzegovina) Haris Hajradinović	(Bulgaria) Strahil Popov	(Croatia) Stipe Perica	(Czech Republic) David Pavelka	(Egypt) Karim Hafez	(Egypt) Trézéguet	(France) Olivier Veigneau	(Guinea) Bengali-Fodé Koita	(Italy) Simone Scuffet	(Kosovo) Loret Sadiku	(Norway) Tobias Heintz	(Portugal) Josué Sá	(Sweden) Abdul Khalili	(Tunisia) Syam Ben Youssef	(Nigeria) Samuel Eduok (Senegal) Mbaye Diagne
Kayserispor	(Cameroon) Jean-Armel Kana-Biyik	(Ghana) Asamoah Gyan	(Ghana) Bernard Mensah	(Netherlands) Tjaronn Chery	(Portugal) Tiago Lopes	(Portugal) Varela	(Romania) Cristian Săpunaru	(Romania) Silviu Lung Jr.	(Ukraine) Artem Kravets	(Ukraine) Oleksandr Kucher					(Slovenia) Rajko Rotman
Konyaspor	(Bosnia and Herzegovina) Amir Hadžiahmetović	(Bosnia and Herzegovina) Deni Milošević	(Burkina Faso) Abdou Traoré	(Denmark) Jens Jønsson	(Germany) Petar Filipović	(Ivory Coast) Moryké Fofana	(Mali) Mustapha Yatabaré	(North Macedonia) Adis Jahović	(North Macedonia) Leonard Zuta	(Peru) Paolo Hurtado	(Senegal) Fallou Diagne	(Serbia) Marko Jevtović	(Slovenia) Nejc Skubic	(Ukraine) Yevhen Opanasenko	(Democratic Republic of the Congo) Wilfred Moke
Sivasspor	(Brazil) David Braz	(Brazil) Douglas	(Ivory Coast) Arouna Koné	(Mali) Fousseni Diabaté	(Portugal) Hugo Vieira	(Republic of the Congo) Delvin N'Dinga	(Romania) Gabriel Torje	(Romania) Paul Papp	(Sweden) Mattias Bjärsmyr	(Ukraine) Serhiy Rybalka	(Uruguay) Sergio Rochet				(Algeria) Carl Medjani (Brazil) Robinho (Ivory Coast) Cyriac
Trabzonspor	(Argentina) José Sosa	(Argentina) Luis Ibáñez	(Colombia) Hugo Rodallega	(Czech Republic) Filip Novák	(Ghana) Caleb Ekuban	(Iran) Majid Hosseini	(Iran) Vahid Amiri	(Nigeria) Anthony Nwakaeme	(Nigeria) Ogenyi Onazi	(Portugal) João Pereira	(Senegal) Zargo Touré	(Slovakia) Juraj Kucka			(Costa Rica) Esteban Alvarado
Yeni Malatyaspor	(Benin) Fabien Farnolle	(Brazil) Guilherme	(Ecuador) Arturo Mina	(France) Michaël Pereira	(Mauritania) Aboubakar Kamara	(Morocco) Issam Chebake	(Netherlands) Mitchell Donald	(Nigeria) Seth Sincere	(Republic of the Congo) Thievy Bifouma	(Senegal) Issiar Dia	(Serbia) Danijel Aleksić				(Ghana) Sulley Muniru (Morocco) Khalid Boutaïb

== League table ==
Pos	Team	Pld	W	D	L	GF	GA	GD	Pts	Qualification or relegation
1	Galatasaray (C)	34	20	9	5	72	36	+36	69	Qualification for the Champions League group stage
2	Başakşehir	34	19	10	5	49	22	+27	67	Qualification for the Champions League third qualifying round
3	Beşiktaş	34	19	8	7	72	46	+26	65	Qualification for the Europa League group stage
4	Trabzonspor	34	18	9	7	64	46	+18	63	Qualification for the Europa League third qualifying round
5	Yeni Malatyaspor	34	13	8	13	47	46	+1	47	Qualification for the Europa League second qualifying round
6	Fenerbahçe	34	11	13	10	44	44	0	46	
7	Antalyaspor	34	13	6	15	39	55	−16	45	
8	Konyaspor	34	9	17	8	40	38	+2	44 (Note: Konyaspor finished ahead of Alanyaspor on head-to-head points: Konyaspor 2–0 Alanyaspor, Alanyaspor 2–4 Konyaspor.)	
9	Alanyaspor	34	12	8	14	37	43	−6	44	
10	Kayserispor	34	10	11	13	35	50	−15	41 (Note: Kayserispor ahead of Çaykur Rizespor and Sivasspor on head-to-head points: Kayserispor 7 pts, Çaykur Rizespor 6 pts, Sivasspor 2 pts.)	
11	Çaykur Rizespor	34	9	14	11	48	50	−2	41	
12	Sivasspor	34	10	11	13	49	54	−5	41	
13	Ankaragücü	34	11	7	16	38	53	−15	40	
14	Kasımpaşa	34	11	6	17	53	62	−9	39	
15	Göztepe	34	11	5	18	37	42	−5	38	
16	Bursaspor (R)	34	7	16	11	28	37	−9	37	Relegation to TFF First League
17	BB Erzurumspor (R)	34	8	11	15	36	43	−7	35	Relegation to TFF First League
18	Akhisarspor (R)	34	6	9	19	33	54	−21	27	Relegation to TFF First League

Source: Süper Lig, Soccerway
Rules for classification: 1) Points; 2) Head-to-head points; 3) Head-to-head goal difference; 4) Head-to-head goals scored; 5) Goal difference; 6) Goals scored; 7) Play-off.
(C) Champions; (R) Relegated

== Results ==
Home \ Away	AKH	ALA	AGÜ	ANT	BJK	BUR	ÇYR	EBB	FNB	GAL	GÖZ	İBF	KAS	KAY	KON	SİV	TRA	YMS
Akhisarspor	—	3–1	1–1	1–2	0–3	2–4	1–1	1–1	3–0	3–0	1–0	0–3	2–3	2–2	0–0	1–1	1–3	0–2
Alanyaspor	2–1	—	0–2	0–1	0–0	1–0	1–1	2–1	1–0	1–1	1–0	1–1	3–0	5–0	2–4	2–0	1–0	0–1
Ankaragücü	1–0	0–2	—	0–1	1–4	0–0	2–2	2–1	1–1	1–3	0–3	0–1	3–0	3–1	0–0	3–1	2–2	1–0
Antalyaspor	1–2	3–0	2–4	—	2–6	0–1	2–1	1–1	0–0	0–1	1–0	0–1	1–0	0–0	3–3	2–1	1–1	3–0
Beşiktaş	2–1	2–1	4–1	2–3	—	2–0	4–1	1–1	3–3	1–0	1–0	2–1	3–2	2–0	3–2	1–2	2–2	2–1
Bursaspor	0–0	2–0	1–0	0–2	1–1	—	0–2	2–1	1–1	2–3	0–0	0–0	1–2	0–0	0–0	3–2	0–1	1–1
Çaykur Rizespor	3–1	1–1	1–1	1–1	2–7	1–1	—	0–0	3–0	2–3	1–0	1–2	2–3	3–0	1–1	0–0	2–3	3–0
Erzurum BB	2–1	1–0	0–1	1–0	1–3	2–0	0–1	—	0–1	1–1	2–1	0–1	1–1	1–1	1–2	4–2	0–1	1–3
Fenerbahçe	2–1	2–0	1–3	3–1	1–1	2–1	3–2	2–2	—	1–1	2–0	0–0	2–2	2–3	1–1	2–1	1–1	3–2
Galatasaray	1–0	6–0	6–0	5–0	2–0	1–1	2–2	1–0	2–2	—	1–0	2–1	4–1	3–1	1–1	4–2	3–1	3–0
Göztepe	0–1	3–2	2–1	4–1	2–0	0–0	2–0	0–1	1–0	0–1	—	0–2	0–0	2–0	3–2	3–3	1–3	1–3
İstanbul Başakşehir	3–1	1–1	2–1	4–0	1–0	3–0	1–1	1–1	2–1	1–1	0–2	—	2–0	1–0	2–0	0–1	2–0	1–1
Kasımpaşa	5–0	1–2	2–1	1–2	4–1	1–1	0–1	2–1	1–3	1–4	3–1	2–1	—	0–3	1–1	1–3	2–2	3–0
Kayserispor	1–0	1–1	0–2	2–0	2–2	1–1	2–2	0–2	1–0	0–3	2–1	1–1	2–1	—	0–2	2–0	0–2	0–0
Konyaspor	0–0	2–0	2–0	2–0	2–2	1–1	0–2	3–2	0–1	0–0	1–1	0–1	3–2	0–1	—	1–1	2–2	1–1
Sivasspor	2–1	1–0	4–0	1–2	1–2	2–0	1–1	2–2	0–0	4–3	2–0	0–0	0–3	1–3	0–0	—	1–1	2–0
Trabzonspor	2–1	0–2	1–0	4–1	2–1	1–1	4–1	0–0	2–1	4–0	1–2	2–4	4–2	4–2	3–0	3–1	—	2–1
Yeni Malatyaspor	1–1	1–1	3–1	2–0	1–2	1–2	1–0	3–1	1–0	2–0	3–2	0–2	2–1	1–1	0–1	4–4	5–0	—

Source: Turkish Football Federation (in Turkish)
Legend: Blue = home team win; Yellow = draw; Red = away team win.

== Positions by round ==
The following table represents the teams' positions after each round in the competition.

Team ╲ Round	1	2	3	4	5	6	7	8	9	10	11	12	13	14	15	16	17	18	19	20	21	22	23	24	25	26	27	28	29	30	31	32	33	34
Galatasaray	1	2	1	2	1	2	1	1	1	3	2	2	3	4	7	5	5	2	2	2	2	2	2	2	2	2	2	2	2	2	1	1	1	1
İstanbul Başakşehir	4	7	4	3	2	1	2	2	2	1	1	1	1	1	1	1	1	1	1	1	1	1	1	1	1	1	1	1	1	1	2	2	2	2
Beşiktaş	7	1	5	7	4	4	3	3	5	4	6	7	4	3	4	3	7	6	6	3	3	3	3	3	3	3	3	3	3	3	3	3	3	3
Trabzonspor	18	9	9	6	7	12	10	5	7	7	9	10	7	7	6	4	2	5	5	5	5	6	4	4	4	4	4	4	4	4	4	4	4	4
Yeni Malatyaspor	2	3	3	8	8	6	9	8	10	8	7	4	5	6	5	2	3	3	3	4	4	4	5	6	6	5	5	5	8	7	5	5	5	5
Fenerbahçe	8	10	11	13	11	13	14	15	15	15	15	13	15	15	17	17	17	15	14	12	14	15	14	14	14	13	13	14	14	14	12	10	8	6
Antalyaspor	17	15	10	9	10	8	4	6	4	5	3	5	6	5	3	7	6	8	8	9	9	9	7	8	10	7	10	7	6	6	7	8	6	7
Konyaspor	6	6	7	5	5	5	8	7	8	10	10	9	9	8	8	8	8	7	4	6	6	5	6	5	5	6	9	10	10	9	8	6	7	8
Alanyaspor	14	18	18	15	13	10	7	10	11	13	13	16	13	13	14	14	14	12	10	10	11	10	9	10	8	11	7	6	5	5	6	7	9	9
Kayserispor	3	5	6	4	6	11	13	13	14	12	12	15	17	17	15	13	13	13	13	14	12	11	10	7	9	12	8	11	12	11	13	11	11	10
Çaykur Rizespor	11	12	14	16	16	17	15	16	16	16	17	18	18	18	18	18	18	18	16	15	16	12	12	13	11	8	11	8	7	8	9	9	10	11
Sivasspor	9	11	13	11	14	16	12	12	12	14	14	11	12	12	9	9	9	9	9	8	7	7	8	9	7	9	12	12	13	12	11	12	14	12
Ankaragücü	16	8	8	10	9	7	11	11	9	6	5	6	8	9	10	11	12	14	15	16	15	16	13	12	13	14	14	13	11	13	14	14	12	13
Kasımpaşa	5	4	2	1	3	3	6	4	3	2	4	3	2	2	2	6	4	4	7	7	8	8	11	11	12	10	6	9	9	10	10	13	13	14
Göztepe	15	17	12	14	12	9	5	9	6	9	8	8	10	11	12	12	10	11	12	13	10	13	15	16	16	16	16	16	17	15	15	15	15	15
Bursaspor	13	14	15	12	15	15	17	14	13	11	11	12	11	10	11	10	11	10	11	11	13	14	16	15	15	15	15	15	15	16	17	16	16	16
BB Erzurumspor	10	16	17	18	17	18	18	18	17	18	18	17	14	14	16	16	16	17	17	17	17	17	17	17	17	17	18	17	16	17	16	17	17	17
Akhisarspor	12	13	16	17	18	14	16	17	18	17	16	14	16	16	13	15	15	16	18	18	18	18	18	18	18	18	17	18	18	18	18	18	18	18

Leader and 2019–20 Champions League group stage
2019–20 UEFA Champions League second qualifying round
2019–20 UEFA Europa League third qualifying round
2019–20 UEFA Europa League second qualifying round
Relegation to 2019–20 TFF First League

Source: tff.org (in Turkish)

== Statistics ==
=== Top goalscorers ===
"Süper Lig Top Goalscorers". TFF.

Pos.	Player	Team	Goals
1	(Senegal) Mbaye Diagne	Kasımpaşa/Galatasaray	30
2	(Kosovo) Vedat Muriqi	Çaykur Rizespor	17
3	(Turkey) Burak Yılmaz	Trabzonspor/Beşiktaş	16
3	(Senegal) Papiss Cissé	Alanyaspor	16
5	(Colombia) Hugo Rodallega	Trabzonspor	15
6	(Nigeria) Henry Onyekuru	Galatasaray	14
7	(Bosnia and Herzegovina) Edin Višća	Başakşehir	12
7	(Brazil) Robinho	Sivasspor/Başakşehir	12
7	(Turkey) Mevlüt Erdinç	Antalyaspor	12
10	(Nigeria) Anthony Nwakaeme	Trabzonspor	10
10	(Serbia) Danijel Aleksić	Yeni Malatyaspor	10
10	(France) Souleymane Doukara	Antalyaspor	10
10	(Ivory Coast) Arouna Koné	Sivasspor	10

=== Hat-tricks ===
Date	Player	For	Against	Result
19 January 2019	(Nigeria) Henry Onyekuru	Galatasaray	Ankaragücü	6–0
17 February 2019	(Algeria) Sofiane Feghouli	Galatasaray	Kasımpaşa	4–1
1 March 2019	(Jamaica) Dever Orgill	Ankaragücü	Antalyaspor	2–4
6 April 2019	(Senegal) Mbaye Diagne	Galatasaray	Yeni Malatyaspor	3–0
8 April 2019	(Turkey) Güven Yalçın	Beşiktaş	Çaykur Rizespor	2–7
24 May 2019	(Turkey) Güven Yalçın	Beşiktaş	Kasımpaşa	3–2

== Awards ==
=== Annual awards ===
Award	Winner	Club
Player of the Season	(Bosnia and Herzegovina) Edin Višća	Başakşehir
Goalkeeper of the Season	(Turkey) Mert Günok	Başakşehir
Defender of the Season	(Moldova) Alexandru Epureanu	Başakşehir
Midfielder of the Season	(Bosnia and Herzegovina) Edin Višća	Başakşehir
Forward of the Season	(Turkey) Burak Yılmaz	Beşiktaş
Young Player of the Season	(Turkey) Dorukhan Tokoz	Beşiktaş
Manager of the Season	(Turkey) Abdullah Avcı	Başakşehir

Team of the Season
Goalkeeper	(Turkey) Mert Günok (Başakşehir)			
Defence	(Turkey) Gökhan Gönül (Beşiktaş)	(Croatia) Domagoj Vida (Beşiktaş)	(Moldova) Alexandru Epureanu (Başakşehir)	(Turkey) Hasan Ali Kaldırım (Fenerbahçe)
Midfield	(Turkey) Emre Belözoğlu (Başakşehir)		(Croatia) Adem Ljajic (Beşiktaş)	(Turkey) Dorukhan Toköz (Beşiktaş)
Attack	(Bosnia and Herzegovina) Edin Visca (Başakşehir)		(Turkey) Burak Yılmaz (Beşiktaş)	(Egypt) Trézéguet (Kasımpaşa)

== Attendances ==
No.	Club	Average attendance	Change	Highest
1	Galatasaray	36,160	-11,3%	51,578
2	Fenerbahçe	35,035	20,7%	44,619
3	Beşiktaş	28,863	-2,4%	39,485
4	Trabzonspor	24,700	22,7%	36,934
5	Bursaspor	20,952	1,1%	—
6	Konyaspor	16,446	35,3%	—
7	Ankaragücü	12,365	—	—
8	Erzurumspor	11,161	—	—
9	Antalyaspor	10,226	-29,7%	—
10	Kayserispor	8,694	-20,2%	—
11	Sivasspor	8,111	-22,1%	—
12	Rizespor	8,050	—	—
13	Göztepe	8,013	18,3%	—
14	Yeni Malatya	7,672	-18,5%	—
15	Akhisarspor	5,624	-3,0%	—
16	Alanyaspor	4,774	-11,8%	—
17	İstanbul Başakşehir	3,860	-24,5%	—
18	Kasımpaşa	2,877	17,4%	—
