= Fernandão (footballer, born 1987) =

Brazilian footballer

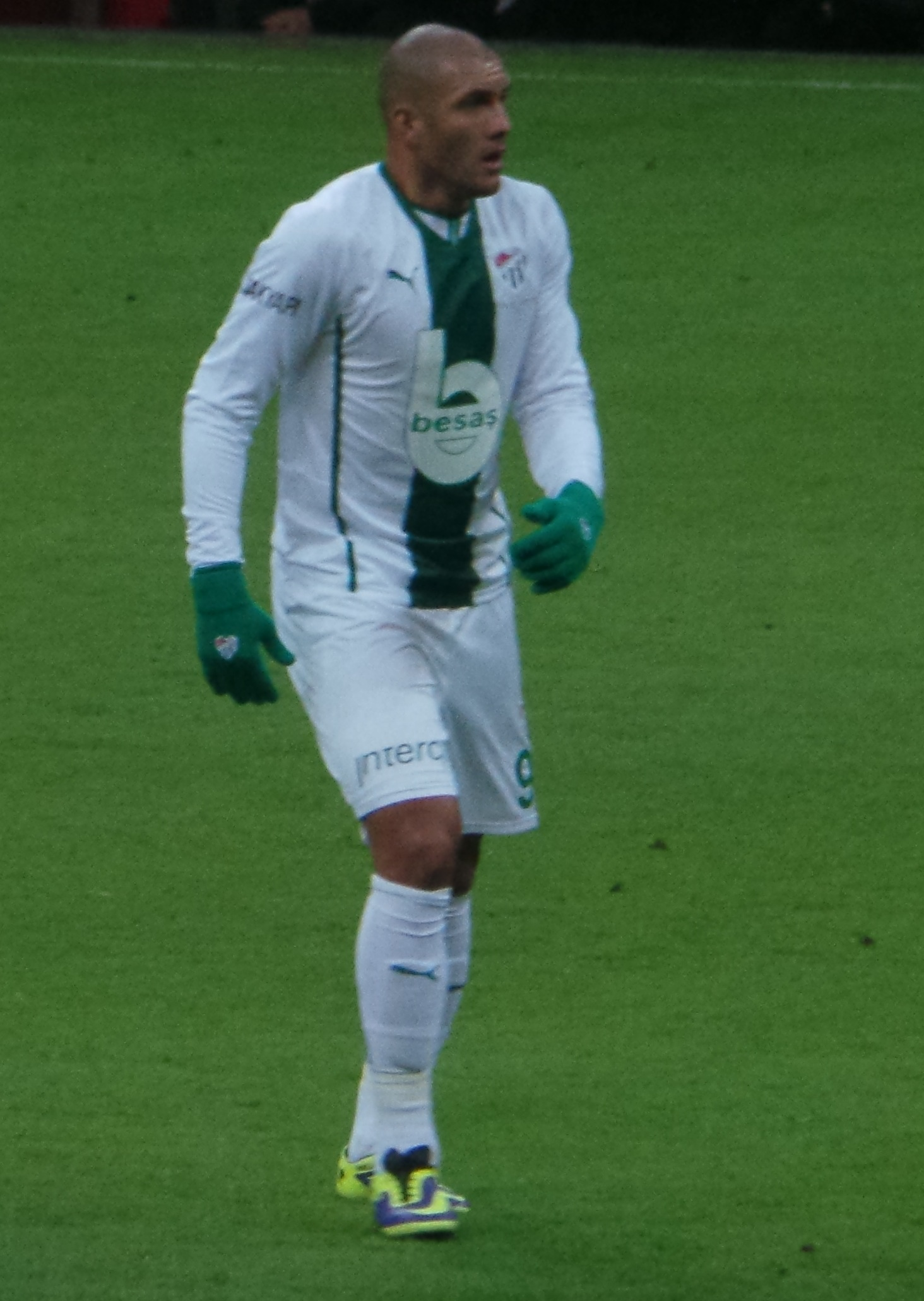
- Fernandão in action for Bursaspor in 2014

Personal information
- Full name: José Fernando Viana de Santana
- Date of birth: 27 March 1987 (age 39)
- Place of birth: Rio de Janeiro, Brazil
- Height: 1.94 m (6 ft 4 in)
- Position: Striker

Team information
- Current team: Tombense

Youth career
- America-RJ

Senior career*
Years	Team	Apps	(Gls)
2007–2008	America-RJ	2	(0)
2008–2012	Tombense	0	(0)
2008	→ Flamengo (loan)	1	(0)
2009	→ Volta Redonda (loan)	5	(2)
2010	→ Macaé (loan)	13	(4)
2010	→ Paysandu (loan)	4	(0)
2011	→ Democrata-GV (loan)	11	(8)
2011	→ Guarani (loan)	13	(4)
2011–2012	→ Palmeiras (loan)	25	(5)
2012–2015	Atlético Paranaense	11	(3)
2013	→ Bahia (loan)	39	(18)
2014–2015	→ Bursaspor (loan)	48	(32)
2015–2018	Fenerbahçe	63	(26)
2018–2019	Al-Wehda	14	(2)
2019–2020	Bahia	37	(10)
2020–2021	Goiás	24	(10)
2023–	Tombense	31	(9)
- * Club domestic league appearances and goals as of 30 October 2023

José Fernando Viana de Santana (born 27 March 1987), commonly known as Fernandão, is a Brazilian professional footballer who plays as a striker for Tombense.

After a journeyman career in his homeland, he had a five-year spell in Turkish football with Bursaspor and Fenerbahçe, totalling 93 games and 49 goals in the Süper Lig. With the former in 2014–15, he was the league's top scorer with 22 goals.

== Career ==
=== Brazil ===
Fernandão started his career with America-RJ in 2006. In 2008, he was signed by Tombense, a proxy club for the investor. He was loaned to Flamengo in September.

Fernandão played for Volta Redonda in 2009 Campeonato Carioca. In 2010, he left for Macaé Esporte Futebol Clube.

In August 2010 he was signed by Paysandu Sport Club for 2010 Campeonato Brasileiro Série C. In January 2011 he was signed by Democrata de Governador Valadares for 2011 Campeonato Mineiro. He signed a seven-month contract with Guarani on 19 May 2011, but soon departed to Palmeiras, on 26 August 2011. Fernandão's first appearance for Palmeiras came in the derby against Corinthians on 28 August 2011, where he came as a substitute at half time and scored 7 minutes later giving Palmeiras an important 2-1 victory.

=== Bursaspor ===
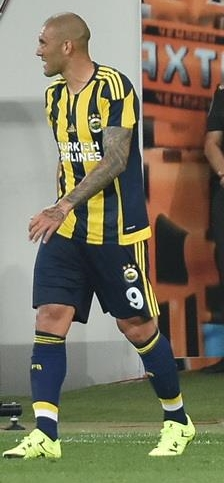
Fernandao playing for Fenerbahçe in 2016

In January 2014, Fernandão joined Turkish Süper Lig team Bursaspor on loan, and he scored two goals on his debut match against Eskişehirspor which Bursaspor won 3–1 at Bursa Atatürk Stadium.

In the 2014–15 season, he finished the campaign as the league's top scorer with 22 goals. He also netted on 22 May 2015 as Bursaspor came from behind to win their Turkish Cup semi-final against Fenerbahçe at the Şükrü Saracoğlu Stadium. Twelve days later as they hosted the final against league champions Galatasaray, Fernandão opened the scoring after Alex Telles conceded a penalty in the 25th minute, but Bursaspor lost 3–2.

=== Fenerbahçe ===
On 25 June 2015, Fenerbahçe agreed to sign Fernandão on a four-year deal. On 28 July, he made his club debut against Shakhtar Donetsk in a UEFA Champions League qualifying play-off game. His league debut was on 14 August, during which he scored the second goal from the edge of the penalty area in a 2–0 win at Eskişehirspor.

=== Al-Wehda ===
On 12 June 2018, Fernandão signed a two-year deal with Al-Wehda Club of the Saudi Professional League, with the option of a third year. He was brought in by Brazilian manager Fábio Carille, who enlisted several other compatriots into the squad.

== Career statistics ==
As of match played 4 February 2021

Appearances and goals by club, season and competition
Club	Season	League			State league (Note: Includes Campeonato Paulista, Campeonato Baiano)		National cup (Note: Includes Copa do Brasil, Turkish Cup)		Continental		Other		Total	
Club	Season	Division	Apps	Goals	Apps	Goals	Apps	Goals	Apps	Goals	Apps	Goals	Apps	Goals
Palmeiras	2011	Série A	18	2	–		–		–		–		18	2
Palmeiras	2012	Série A	–		7	3	1	0	–		–		8	3
Palmeiras	Total		18	2	7	3	1	0	–		–		26	5
Athletico Paranaense	2012	Série B	11	3	–		–		–		–		11	3
Bahia (loan)	2013	Série A	34	15	5	3	1	0	1 (Note: Appearance(s) in Copa Sudamericana)	0	–		41	18
Bursaspor (loan)	2013–14	Süper Lig	16	10	–		7	2	–		–		23	12
Bursaspor (loan)	2014–15	Süper Lig	32	22	–		11	4	1 (Note: Appearance in UEFA Europa League)	0	–		44	26
Bursaspor (loan)	Total		48	32	–		18	6	1	0	–		67	38
Fenerbahçe	2015–16	Süper Lig	32	13	–		10	6	13 (Note: Two appearances in UEFA Champions League, eleven appearances and six goals in UEFA Europa League)	6	–		55	25
Fenerbahçe	2016–17	Süper Lig	13	4	–		6	7	6 (Note: Two appearances in UEFA Champions League, four appearances and one goal in UEFA Europa League)	1	–		25	12
Fenerbahçe	2017–18	Süper Lig	18	9	–		6	4	1	1	–		25	14
Fenerbahçe	Total		63	26	–		22	17	20	8	–		105	51
Al Wehda	2018–19	Saudi Pro League	14	2	–		0	0	–		–		14	2
Bahia	2019	Série A	32	5	4	5	8	2	1	0	3 (Note: Appearances in Copa do Nordeste)	1	48	13
Bahia	2020	Série A	1	0	2	0	0	0	2	0	10	3	15	3
Bahia	Total		33	5	6	5	8	2	3	0	13	4	63	16
Goiás	2020	Série A	24	10	–		–		–		–		24	10
Career total			217	86	18	11	44	21	24	7	13	4	351	143

== Honours ==
Paysandu

- Campeonato Paraense: 2010

Bahia

- Campeonato Baiano: 2019
