= Paschal Okoli =

Nigerian footballer (born 1997)

Personal information
- Full name: Paschal Onyedika Okoli
- Date of birth: 17 October 1997 (age 29)
- Place of birth: Nigeria
- Position: Midfielder

Team information
- Current team: Čelik Zenica
- Number: 4

Youth career
- 2016–2017: Bursaspor

Senior career*
| Years | Team | Apps | (Gls) |
| 2017–2018 | Bursaspor | 1 | (0) |
| 2017–2018 | Bursaspor U21 | 5 | (1) |
| 2018 | → Čelik Zenica (loan) | 7 | (1) |
| 2018–2019 | Bursaspor | 0 | (0) |
| 2019– | Čelik Zenica | 11 | (0) |
- * Club domestic league appearances and goals as of 25 May 2019

Paschal Onyedika Okoli (born 17 October 1997) is a Nigerian professional footballer who plays as a midfielder for Premier League of Bosnia and Herzegovina club NK Čelik Zenica.

== Club career ==
=== Early career ===
Okoli signed his first professional contract with Turkish Süper Lig club Bursaspor on 14 July 2017. He made his professional debut with Bursaspor in a 2–1 league loss to Galatasaray on 24 September 2017.

While at the club, Okoli also played for the U21 team of Bursaspor, making 5 appearances and scoring one goal.

From February to June 2018, he was loaned out to Premier League of Bosnia and Herzegovina club NK Čelik Zenica. He played 7 matches for Čelik and scored one goal in that period.

After coming back to Bursaspor in June 2018, Okoli didn't make a single appearance in the 2018–19 Süper Lig season, and in February 2019, he left Bursaspor.

=== Čelik Zenica ===
On 18 February 2019, shortly after leaving Bursaspor, Okoli returned to and signed for Čelik Zenica.

He made his debut for Čelik on 2 March 2019, in a 1–1 league draw against FK Tuzla City.

== Career statistics ==
=== Club ===
As of match played 25 May 2019

| Club | Season | League | | | Cup | | Continental | | Total | |
| Club | Season | Division | Apps | Goals | Apps | Goals | Apps | Goals | Apps | Goals |
|---|---|---|---|---|---|---|---|---|---|---|
| Bursaspor | 2017–18 | Süper Lig | 1 | 0 | 1 | 0 | — | | 2 | 0 |
| Čelik Zenica (loan) | 2017–18 | Bosnian Premier League | 7 | 1 | — | | — | | 7 | 1 |
| Bursaspor | 2018–19 | Süper Lig | 0 | 0 | 0 | 0 | — | | 0 | 0 |
| Čelik Zenica | 2018–19 | Bosnian Premier League | 11 | 0 | — | | — | | 11 | 0 |
| Career total | | | 19 | 1 | 1 | 0 | — | | 20 | 1 |
