= Celal Emir Dede =

Turkish footballer

Personal information
- Full name: Celal Emir Dede
- Date of birth: 2 May 2001 (age 25)
- Place of birth: Balıkesir, Turkey
- Height: 1.79 m (5 ft 10 in)
- Position: Winger

Team information
- Current team: Karaköprü Belediyespor

Youth career
- 2013–2018: Balıkesirspor

Senior career*
Years	Team	Apps	(Gls)
2018–2021	Balıkesirspor	34	(3)
2021–2023	Çaykur Rizespor	1	(0)
2021–2022	→ Uşakspor (loan)	10	(0)
2022	→ Somaspor (loan)	15	(3)
2022	→ Esenler Erokspor (loan)	0	(0)
2022–2023	→ Sivas Belediyespor (loan)	14	(0)
2023–	Karaköprü Belediyespor	0	(0)
- * Club domestic league appearances and goals as of 16 October 2022 ‡ National team caps and goals as of 19:16, 16 May 2021 (UTC)

Celal Emir Dede (born 2 May 2001) is a Turkish professional footballer who plays as a winger for Karaköprü Belediyespor.

== Professional career ==
A youth product of Balıkesirspor, Dede began his senior career with the club in the TFF First League in 2018. On 1 February 2021, he transferred to Çaykur Rizespor. He made his senior debut with Çaykur Rizespor in a 2-0 Süper Lig loss to İstanbul Başakşehir on 15 May 2021.
