= Edin Višća =

Bosnian footballer (born 1990)

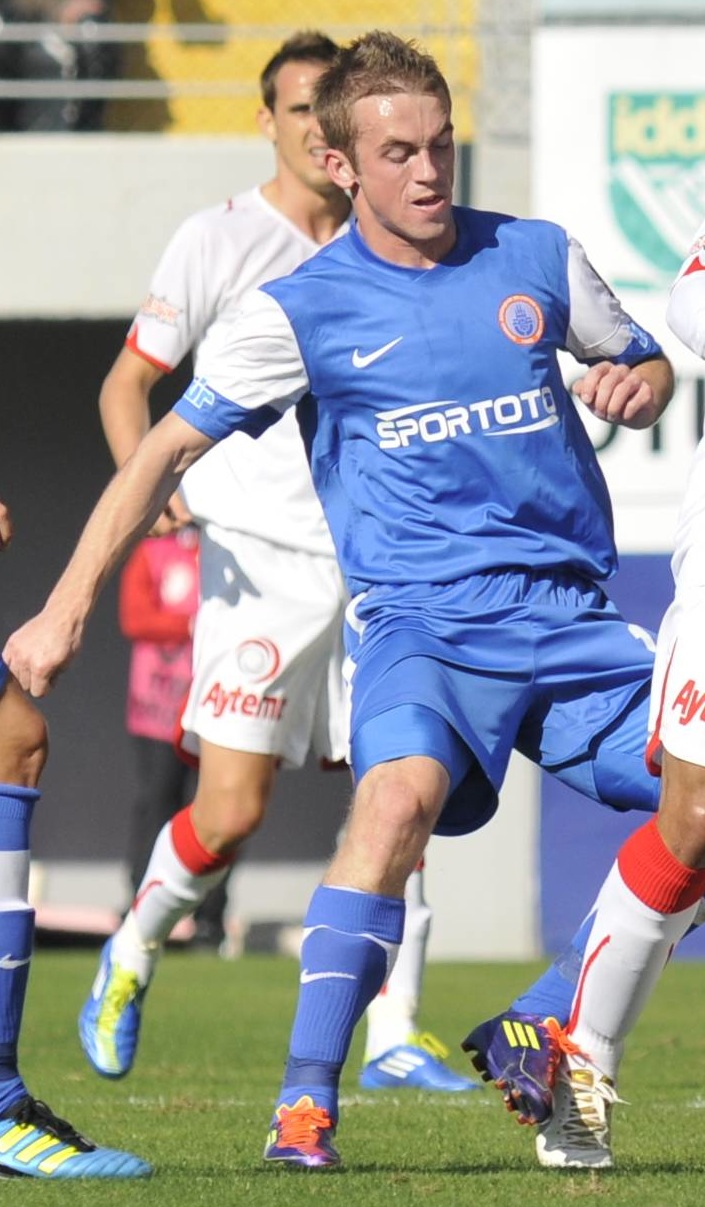
- Višća playing for İstanbul Başakşehir in 2011

Personal information
- Date of birth: 17 February 1990 (age 36)
- Place of birth: Olovo, SR Bosnia and Herzegovina, SFR Yugoslavia
- Height: 1.72 m (5 ft 8 in)
- Position: Winger

Team information
- Current team: İstanbul Başakşehir
- Number: 10

Youth career
- 2005–2007: Budućnost Banovići

Senior career*
Years	Team	Apps	(Gls)
2007–2009	Budućnost Banovići		
2009–2011	Željezničar	39	(11)
2011–2022	İstanbul Başakşehir	344	(95)
2022–2026	Trabzonspor	107	(16)
2026–	İstanbul Başakşehir	3	(1)

International career
2007–2009	Bosnia and Herzegovina U19	17	(1)
2010–2012	Bosnia and Herzegovina U21	16	(3)
2010–2020	Bosnia and Herzegovina	55	(10)
- * Club domestic league appearances and goals as of 7 November 2026

Edin Višća (pronounced [ědin ʋǐʃtɕa]; born 17 February 1990) is a Bosnian professional footballer who plays as a winger for Süper Lig club İstanbul Başakşehir.

Višća started his professional career at Budućnost Banovići, before joining Željezničar in 2009. Two years later, he moved to İstanbul Başakşehir. In 2022, he signed with Trabzonspor. He came back to İstanbul Başakşehir in 2026.

A former youth international for Bosnia and Herzegovina, Višća made his senior international debut in 2010, earning over 50 caps and scoring 10 goals until 2020. He represented the nation at their first ever major championship, the 2014 FIFA World Cup.

== Club career ==
=== Early career ===
Višća came through Budućnost Banovići's youth setup, which he joined in 2005. He made his professional debut against Ozren Semizovac on 10 September 2007 at the age of 17.

=== Željezničar ===
In September 2009, Višća signed a three-year contract with Željezničar. He made his official debut for the team against Čelik Zenica on 27 February 2010. On 3 April, he scored his first goal for Željezničar in a triumph over Travnik. He won his first trophy with the club on 23 May, when they were crowned league champions.

=== İstanbul Başakşehir ===
In August 2011, Višća moved to Turkish outfit İstanbul Başakşehir on a five-year deal. He made his competitive debut for the side on 11 September against Galatasaray. On 3 January 2012, he scored his first goal for İstanbul Başakşehir against the same opponent.

He made his 100th appearance for the team against Boluspor on 13 April 2014.

Višća was an important piece in İstanbul Başakşehir's capture of the 1. Lig title, his first trophy with the club, which was secured on 23 April and earned them promotion to the Süper Lig just one season after being relegated. He had an impact of 10 goals and 10 assists.

In August 2016, he extended his contract with the squad until June 2020.

He scored his 51st goal for İstanbul Başakşehir in a defeat of Kayserispor on 14 January 2017, becoming their top all-time goalscorer.

Višća played his 200th game for the side on 18 February against Gaziantepspor.

He appeared in his 300th match for the team on 24 May against Alanyaspor and managed to score a goal.

Višća was instrumental in İstanbul Başakşehir's conquest of the Süper Lig title, first in their history, which was sealed on 19 July 2020. He scored 13 goals and added 12 assists.

He scored his 100th goal for the club in a loss to Kasımpaşa on 26 July.

In October, he signed a new five-year deal with İstanbul Başakşehir.

Višća debuted in the UEFA Champions League away at RB Leipzig on 20 October. Two weeks later, he scored his first goal in the competition against Manchester United.

=== Trabzonspor ===
In January 2022, Višća was transferred to Trabzonspor for an undisclosed fee. He debuted officially for the squad against Sivasspor on 15 January. On 23 January, he scored his first goal for Trabzonspor against Galatasaray, which secured the victory for his team. He won his first piece of silverware with the club on 30 April, when they were proclaimed league winners.

Višća gave his 109th assist in the Süper Lig on 21 January 2024 and became the best assist provider in league history, surpassing the previous record of 108 held by Alex.

He played his 100th tie for Trabzonspor against Sivasspor on 20 January 2025.

In January, he penned a new one-year contract with the side.

=== Return to İstanbul Başakşehir ===
In June 2026, Višća returned to İstanbul Başakşehir on a deal until June 2027. He played his first competitive fixture for the team since coming back on 18 October against Gaziantep.

Višća made his 400th appearance for the club against Samsunspor on 1 November.

On 7 November, he scored his first goal for İstanbul Başakşehir against Göztepe, which ensured the win for his squad.

== International career ==
Višća represented Bosnia and Herzegovina at various youth levels.

In November 2010, he received his first senior call up, for a friendly game against Poland, and debuted in that match on 10 December.

In June 2014, Višća was named in Bosnia and Herzegovina's squad for the 2014 FIFA World Cup, country's first ever major competition. He made his tournament debut in the opening group tie against Argentina on 15 June.

On 12 June 2015, in a UEFA Euro 2016 qualifier against Israel, Višća scored a brace, his first senior international goals.

He scored his first career hat-trick against South Korea on 1 June 2018.

Višća retired from international football on 21 May 2021.

== Personal life ==
Višća is a practising Muslim; together with international teammates Ibrahim Šehić, Muhamed Bešić, Armin Hodžić, Izet Hajrović, Sead Kolašinac and Ervin Zukanović he visited a mosque in Zenica during the national team's concentration.

== Career statistics ==
=== Club ===
As of match played 7 November 2026

Appearances and goals by club, season and competition
Club	Season	League			National cup (Note: Includes Bosnian Cup, Turkish Cup)		Continental		Other		Total	
Club	Season	Division	Apps	Goals	Apps	Goals	Apps	Goals	Apps	Goals	Apps	Goals
Željezničar	2009–10	Bosnian Premier League	11	2	4	2	–		–		15	4
Željezničar	2010–11	Bosnian Premier League	27	9	6	0	2 (Note: Appearances in UEFA Champions League)	0	–		35	9
Željezničar	2011–12	Bosnian Premier League	1	0	0	0	3 (Note: Appearances in UEFA Europa League)	0	–		4	0
Željezničar	Total		39	11	10	2	5	0	–		54	13
İstanbul Başakşehir	2011–12	Süper Lig	36	5	1	0	–		–		37	5
İstanbul Başakşehir	2012–13	Süper Lig	28	3	0	0	–		–		28	3
İstanbul Başakşehir	2013–14	1. Lig	34	10	1	0	–		–		35	10
İstanbul Başakşehir	2014–15	Süper Lig	34	8	1	0	–		–		35	8
İstanbul Başakşehir	2015–16	Süper Lig	34	17	5	0	2	0	–		41	17
İstanbul Başakşehir	2016–17	Süper Lig	34	8	6	0	3	2	–		43	10
İstanbul Başakşehir	2017–18	Süper Lig	33	9	1	0	9 (Note: Four appearances, two goals in UEFA Champions League; five appearances, three goals in UEFA Europa League)	5	–		43	14
İstanbul Başakşehir	2018–19	Süper Lig	34	13	2	1	2	0	–		38	14
İstanbul Başakşehir	2019–20	Süper Lig	33	13	2	0	12 (Note: Two appearances in UEFA Champions League; ten appearances, six goals in UEFA Europa League)	6	–		47	19
İstanbul Başakşehir	2020–21	Süper Lig	26	5	1	0	5	1	0	0	32	6
İstanbul Başakşehir	2021–22	Süper Lig	18	4	1	0	–		–		19	4
İstanbul Başakşehir	Total		344	95	21	1	33	14	–		398	110
Trabzonspor	2021–22	Süper Lig	18	5	3	1	–		–		21	6
Trabzonspor	2022–23	Süper Lig	13	2	1	0	0	0	1 (Note: Appearance in Turkish Super Cup)	0	15	2
Trabzonspor	2023–24	Süper Lig	37	5	7	2	–		–		44	7
Trabzonspor	2024–25	Süper Lig	30	4	5	2	5 (Note: Three appearances in UEFA Europa League; two appearances in UEFA Conference League)	0	–		40	6
Trabzonspor	2025–26	Süper Lig	9	0	0	0	–		0	0	9	0
Trabzonspor	Total		107	16	16	5	5	0	1	0	129	21
İstanbul Başakşehir	2026–27	Süper Lig	3	1	0	0	0	0	–		3	1
Career total			493	123	47	8	43	14	1	0	584	145

=== International ===
Appearances and goals by national team and year
National team	Year	Apps	Goals
Bosnia and Herzegovina
Bosnia and Herzegovina	2010	1	0
Bosnia and Herzegovina	2011	0	0
Bosnia and Herzegovina	2012	0	0
Bosnia and Herzegovina	2013	6	0
Bosnia and Herzegovina	2014	8	0
Bosnia and Herzegovina	2015	7	2
Bosnia and Herzegovina	2016	6	0
Bosnia and Herzegovina	2017	5	3
Bosnia and Herzegovina	2018	9	3
Bosnia and Herzegovina	2019	8	2
Bosnia and Herzegovina	2020	5	0
Total		55	10

Scores and results list Bosnia and Herzegovina's goal tally first, score column indicates score after each Višća goal.

List of international goals scored by Edin Višća
No.	Date	Venue	Cap	Opponent	Score	Result	Competition
1	12 June 2015	Bilino Polje, Zenica, Bosnia and Herzegovina	17	Israel	1–1	3–1	UEFA Euro 2016 qualifying
2	12 June 2015	Bilino Polje, Zenica, Bosnia and Herzegovina	17	Israel	3–1	3–1	UEFA Euro 2016 qualifying
3	25 March 2017	Bilino Polje, Zenica, Bosnia and Herzegovina	29	Gibraltar	4–0	5–0	2018 FIFA World Cup qualification
4	31 August 2017	GSP Stadium, Nicosia, Cyprus	31	Cyprus	2–0	2–3	2018 FIFA World Cup qualification
5	7 October 2017	Grbavica, Sarajevo, Bosnia and Herzegovina	33	Belgium	2–1	3–4	2018 FIFA World Cup qualification
6	1 June 2018	Jeonju World Cup Stadium, Jeonju, South Korea	36	South Korea	1–0	3–1	Friendly
7	1 June 2018	Jeonju World Cup Stadium, Jeonju, South Korea	36	South Korea	2–1	3–1	Friendly
8	1 June 2018	Jeonju World Cup Stadium, Jeonju, South Korea	36	South Korea	3–1	3–1	Friendly
9	26 March 2019	Bilino Polje, Zenica, Bosnia and Herzegovina	44	Greece	1–0	2–2	UEFA Euro 2020 qualifying
10	5 September 2019	Bilino Polje, Zenica, Bosnia and Herzegovina	47	Liechtenstein	4–0	5–0	UEFA Euro 2020 qualifying

== Honours ==
Željezničar

- Bosnian Premier League: 2009–10
- Bosnian Cup: 2010–11

İstanbul Başakşehir

- Süper Lig: 2019–20
- 1. Lig: 2013–14

Trabzonspor

- Süper Lig: 2021–22
- Turkish Cup: 2025–26
- Turkish Super Cup: 2022

Individual

- Süper Lig Player of the Season: 2018–19
- Süper Lig top assist provider: 2017–18, 2018–19, 2019–20
