= Ali Karakaya =

Turkish footballer

Personal information
- Date of birth: 1 January 2002 (age 24)
- Place of birth: Isparta, Turkey
- Height: 1.79 m (5 ft 10 in)
- Position: Midfielder

Team information
- Current team: Balıkesirspor

Youth career
- 2013–2014: Merkez Gençlikspor
- 2014–2015: Gülspor
- 2015–2019: Konyaspor

Senior career*
Years	Team	Apps	(Gls)
2019–2023	Konyaspor	0	(0)
2021–2022	→ 1922 Konyaspor (loan)	56	(1)
2023–2024	Nazilli Belediyespor	33	(0)
2024–	Balıkesirspor	0	(0)

International career^{‡}
2018–2019	Turkey U17	13	(1)
2019	Turkey U18	7	(0)
- * Club domestic league appearances and goals as of 17 July 2024 ‡ National team caps and goals as of 13 January 2021

Ali Karakaya (born 1 January 2002) is a Turkish football player who plays as a midfielder for Balıkesirspor.

== Professional career ==
Karakaya signed his first professional contract with Konyaspor on 25 April 2019. Karakaya made his professional debut with Konyaspor in a 2–1 Turkish Cup win over Gaziantep on 13 January 2021.

In July 2024, Karakaya joined Balıkesirspor on a one-year deal.
