= İsmail Ertekin =

Turkish footballer

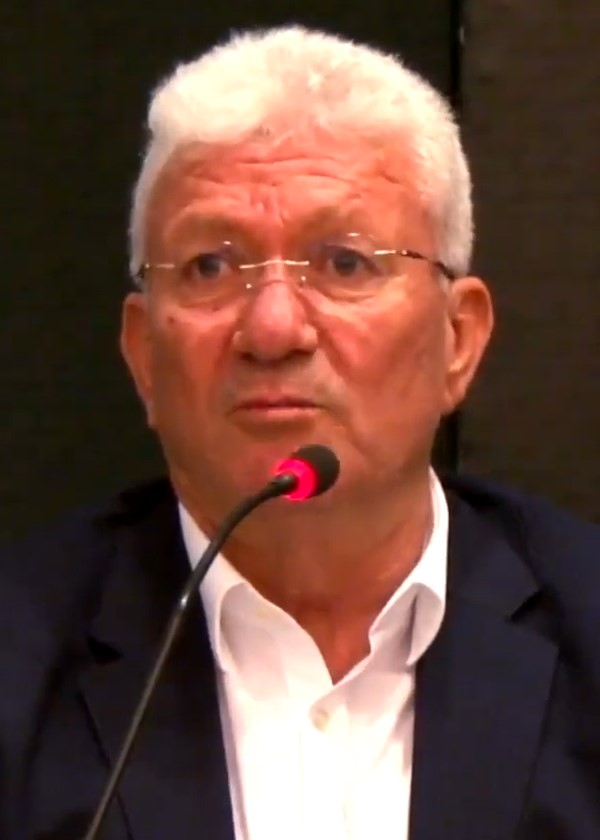
- Ertekin in 2022

Personal information
- Date of birth: 1 January 1959 (age 67)
- Place of birth: Bursa, Turkey

Managerial career
- Years: Team
- 1993–1995: Bursaspor (youth)
- 1995–1996: Bursa Merinosspor (assistant)
- 1996–1999: Bursaspor (assistant)
- 1999: Adanaspor (assistant)
- 2001–2004: Oyak Renaultspor
- 2004: Bursaspor (assistant)
- 2004–2005: Turgutluspor
- 2005–2006: Orhangazispor
- 2006: Fatih Karagümrük
- 2006–2007: Turgutluspor
- 2007–2008: Bozüyükspor
- 2009–2011: Bandırmaspor
- 2011–2012: Oyak Renaultspor
- 2012–2014: Balıkesirspor
- 2015: Kocaeli Birlik Spor
- 2016: Bandırmaspor
- 2017: Kastamonuspor
- 2018: Bandırmaspor
- 2018: İnegölspor
- 2018–2019: Sakaryaspor
- 2019–2020: Manisa FK
- 2020: Sarıyer
- 2020: Sakaryaspor
- 2022: Bursaspor (sporting director)
- 2022–2023: Bursaspor

İsmail Ertekin (born 1 January 1959) is a Turkish football manager.
