= Balıkesir Atatürk Stadium =

Football stadium in Balıkesir, Turkey

Coordinates: 39°38′28.30″N 27°53′15.60″E

Balıkesir Atatürk Stadyumu
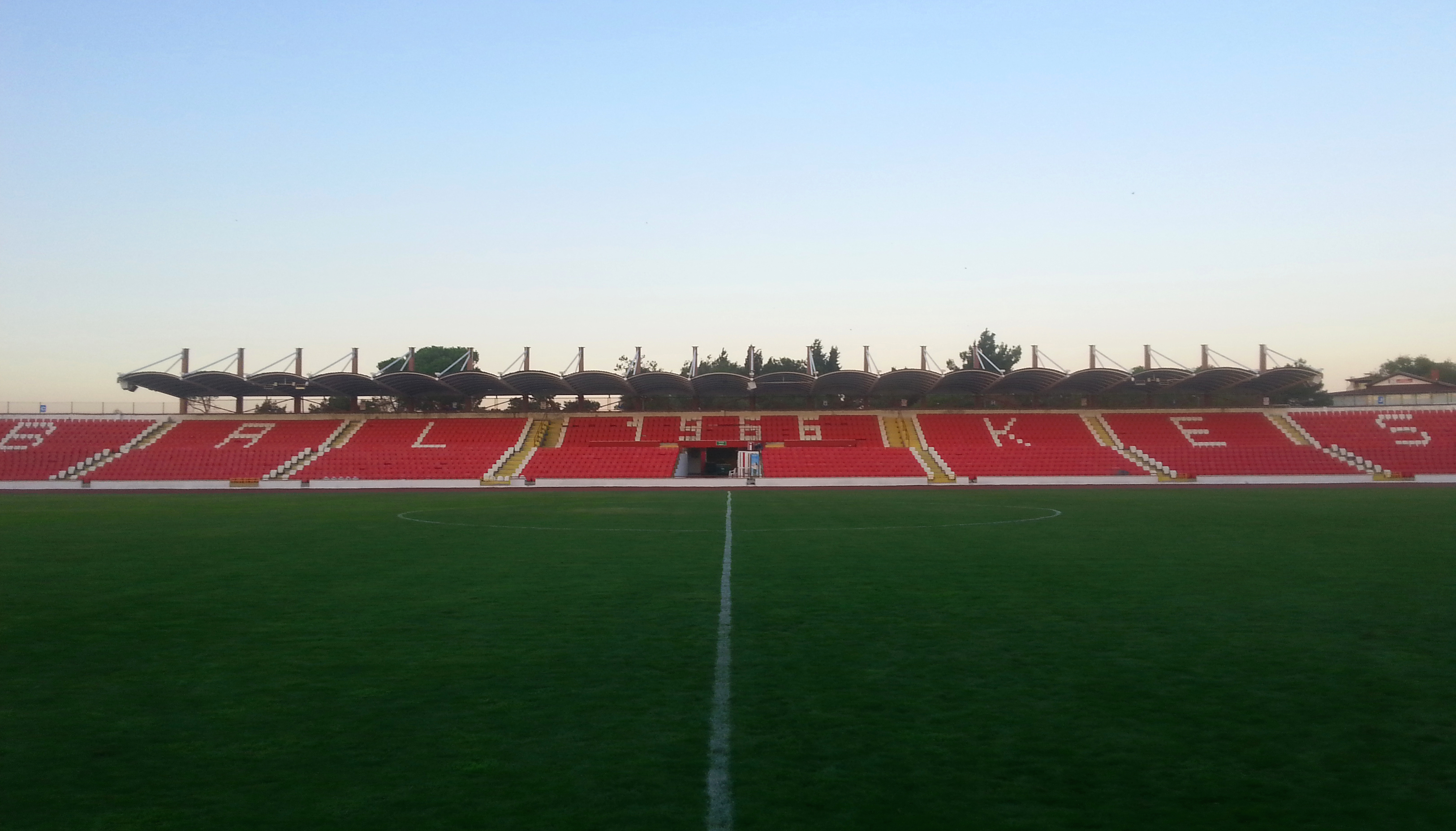
- Interactive map of Balıkesir Atatürk Stadyumu
- Location: Balıkesir, Turkey
- Owner: Republic of Turkey
- Capacity: 15,800
- Surface: Grass

Construction
- Opened: 1953

Tenant
- Balıkesirspor

Balıkesir Atatürk Stadium (Turkish: Balıkesir Atatürk Stadyumu) is a multi-purpose stadium in Balıkesir, Turkey. The stadium holds 15,800 all-seater and was built in 1973 and re-built in 2010. It abides UEFA standards for TFF standards for hosting TFF Second League, TFF First League and also Super Lig games.

The stadium is currently used mostly for football matches, and is the home ground of Balıkesirspor. Turkey national under-21 football team also played games at this stadium. It is also the venue for the celebrations of national days and public concerts.

During renovation work in 2010, the 500-metre-long track was removed and the stands were expanded, increasing the stadium's seating capacity. Floodlighting work was carried out during the 2013–14 season, and the 1. Lig match between Balıkesirspor and Gaziantep Büyükşehir Belediyespor on 16 February 2014 was the first night match played at the stadium.
