= Aykan Atik =

Turkish footballer

Personal information
- Date of birth: 28 December 1971 (age 54)
- Place of birth: Çankaya, Ankara, Turkey
- Position: Winger

Team information
- Current team: Amed S.K. (manager)

Senior career*
Years	Team	Apps	(Gls)
1993–1994	Gençlerbirliği		
1994–1995	Mersin Polisgücü		
1995–1997	Kayserispor		
1997–1999	Gebzespor		
1999–2000	Kardemir Karabükspor		
2000	Pendikspor (loan)		
2000–2002	Cizrespor		
2002–2003	Boluspor		
2003–2004	Aksarayspor		
2004–2006	Kozan Belediyespor		
2006–2007	Cankaya Genclik Spor		

Managerial career
- 2007–2009: Gebzespor (assistant)
- 2009–2010: Gebzespor
- 2011: Gebzespor (assistant)
- 2011: Gümüşhanespor (assistant)
- 2011: Gümüşhanespor
- 2012: Gebzespor
- 2012: Gebzespor (assistant)
- 2013: Ankaragücü (assistant)
- 2013–2014: Hacettepe (assistant)
- 2014: Ankaragücü (assistant)
- 2014–2015: Ankaragücü
- 2016: Gölbaşıspor
- 2017–2018: Etimesgut Belediyespor
- 2019: Ankaragücü (caretaker)
- 2019–2020: Ankaragücü (scout)
- 2020–2021: Amedspor
- 2021: Çorum
- 2021–2022: Amedspor
- * Club domestic league appearances and goals

Aykan Atik (born 28 December 1971) is a retired Turkish football winger and later manager.
