= Bayram Bektaş =

Turkish footballer and coach

Personal information
- Full name: Bayram Kadir Bektaş
- Date of birth: 10 February 1974 (age 52)
- Place of birth: Trabzon, Turkey
- Height: 1.83 m (6 ft 0 in)
- Position: Midfielder

Youth career
- 1980–1994: AJ Auxerre

Senior career*
Years	Team	Apps	(Gls)
1994–1995	Bilecikspor	24	(7)
1995–1996	Sarıyer	60	(4)
1997–1998	Antalyaspor	38	(3)
1998–1999	Altay	27	(3)
1999–2003	Beşiktaş	70	(8)
2003–2004	Trabzonspor	0	(0)
2004–2005	Konyaspor	4	(0)
2005–2007	Kocaelispor	6	(0)
Total		229	(25)

Managerial career
- 2015: Elazığspor
- 2015–2016: Büyükşehir Gaziantepspor
- 2016–2017: Elazığspor
- 2017–2018: Ümraniyespor
- 2018: Göztepe
- 2018–2019: Ankaragücü
- 2019–2020: Turkey (assistant)
- 2020: Kayserispor
- 2021: Turkey (assistant)
- 2022: Samsunspor
- * Club domestic league appearances and goals

Bayram Bektaş (born 10 February 1974) is a UEFA Pro Licensed Turkish football manager and former footballer. He is best known for his spell at Turkish side Beşiktaş. Used to play at midfield, Bektaş was able to adapt to attacking midfield or winger positions during his professional career. Bektaş was a part of Beşiktaş squad winning the Süper Lig title in the centenary year of the club.

== Career ==
Following his retirement, Bektaş worked at Bucaspor, Eskişehirspor, Elazığspor, Gaziantepspor between 2010 and 2013, where he was appointed as assistant manager. He served under Bülent Uygun as assistant manager at Eskişehirspor and Gaziantepspor. The duo later joined Qatari side Umm Salal SC in 2014. Bektaş began his managerial career with TFF First League side Elazığspor in 2015 and he left after a few months. Bektaş joined Büyükşehir Gaziantepspor the same season and finished the TFF First League in 8th position, and he left at the end of the season. The following season, he returned to his first managerial club to Elazığspor in 2016, and finished the season in 10th position. In 2017 Bektaş asked to leave the club, then joined another TFF First League team Ümraniyespor. Bektaş immediately aided the team in achieving promotion playoffs but Ümraniyespor lost two games with score 4–3 and 2–1 and failed to gain promotion to Süper Lig. On 23 May 2017, Bektaş was appointed the Süper Lig side Göztepe for 1+1 years.

On 19 December 2018, Bektaş was appointed as the manager of MKE Ankaragücü. However, after less than a month, he parted ways with the club.

== Honours ==
Beşiktaş

- Süper Lig (1): 2002–03

Sarıyer

- 1. Lig (1): 1995–96

== Personal life ==
Due to spending youth years on French side AJ Auxerre, Bektaş is fluent in French language. Bektaş is married with one child.
