= Ali Ravcı =

Turkish footballer

Personal information
- Date of birth: 1 January 1973 (age 53)
- Place of birth: Malatya, Turkey
- Height: 1.88 m (6 ft 2 in)

Senior career*
Years	Team	Apps	(Gls)
1990–1991	Malatyaspor		
1991–1992	Balıkesirspor		
1992–1994	Sarıyer		
1995	Gaziantepspor		
1996	Zonguldakspor		
1996–2000	Vanspor		
2001–2002	Kayserispor		
2002–2003	Malatyaspor		
2003	Mersin İdmanyurdu		
2004	Siirtspor		
2004–2005	Yimpaş Yozgatspor		
2005–2006	Zonguldakspor		

International career
- Turkey U21

Managerial career
- 2009–2010: Diyarbakır Belediyespor
- 2011: Kayapınar Belediyespor (assistant)
- 2011: Kayapınar Belediyespor
- 2011–2012: Diyarbakırspor
- 2019: Yeni Malatyaspor
- 2020: Yeni Malatyaspor
- * Club domestic league appearances and goals

Ali Ravcı (born 1 January 1973) is a Turkish football manager and former player.
