= Kemal Özdeş =

Turkish footballer and manager

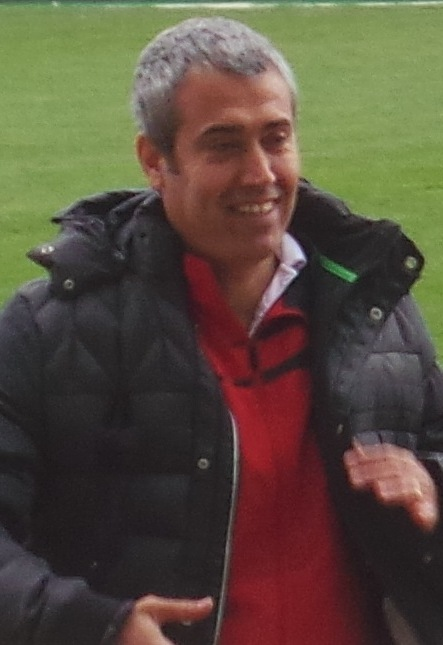
- Özdeş in 2014

Personal information
- Date of birth: 10 May 1970 (age 56)
- Place of birth: Manisa, Turkey
- Height: 1.78 m (5 ft 10 in)
- Position: Midfielder

Senior career*
Years	Team	Apps	(Gls)
1993–1994	Manisa Mensucatspor	3	(0)

Managerial career
- 2011–2012: Manisaspor
- 2013–2014: Manisaspor
- 2014: Gençlerbirliği
- 2014–2015: Balıkesirspor
- 2015: Karşıyaka
- 2016: Elazığspor
- 2016–2018: Kasımpaşa
- 2018–2019: Göztepe
- 2019: Kasımpaşa
- 2020: Yeni Malatyaspor
- 2023: Kasımpaşa
- 2024: Ankaragücü
- 2024–2025: Ankaragücü
- * Club domestic league appearances and goals

Kemal Özdeş (born 10 May 1970) is a Turkish football manager and former player who was most recently the head coach of Ankaragücü.

== Club career ==
There is limited information available about Özdeş career as a football player. He primarily played for different teams in the local amateur league of his home province, Manisa. In the later stages of his career, he spent around one and a half seasons playing for Manisa Mensucatspor.

== Managerial career ==
After his football career, Özdeş decided to become a coach, by starting as an assistant coach at Bergama Belediyespor in 1995. He assisted various coaches until 2009 and developed strong relationships with Tevfik Lav, Mesut Bakkal, and Ersun Yanal. When Yanal became the Sporting Director of the Turkish national team in 2010, Özdeş was chosen to coach the national U-19 football team. Though his team reached the UEFA European Under-19 Championship in 2011, they were eliminated in the group stage. Concurrently, he assisted the U-21 national team.

After leaving the U-19 coaching role, Özdeş briefly led Manisaspor in the top-tier league but stepped down due to declining performance in the 2013–14 season. He then coached Manisaspor in the second division, securing a 7th place finish. Özdeş signed with Gençlerbirliği in May 2014 but departed shortly, joining Balıkesirspor in December 2014. Unfortunately, his tenure was short-lived, and he resigned in April 2015. Özdeş later coached Kasımpaşa, leaving in October 2018 due to role changes. He briefly coached Göztepe in early 2019 and returned to Kasımpaşa in July 2019. Subsequently, he was appointed as the head coach of Yeni Malatyaspor in January 2020, only to part ways in March 2020.

On 4 April 2023, Kasımpaşa announced Özdeş's return as head coach, filling the position left by Selçuk İnan. Özdeş had previously managed the team twice. The club expressed excitement about his return and their commitment to achieving success together.

On 11 February 2025, Ankaragücü and Özdeş mutually agreed to part ways.

== Tactics ==
Özdeş prefers to play in a 4–5–1 formation, with the defensive players staying deep when the opponent has the ball, while the midfielders apply pressing. Upon winning the ball, there is a quick transition, with Özdeş relying on fast wingers who often move into the opponent's penalty area during attacks to create a numerical advantage. The striker often acts as a 'False Nine,' dropping back to evade the marking of the opposing defenders.

== Personal life ==
He was born in Manisa, Turkey. He graduated from Manisa Celal Bayar University in 1994.

== Managerial statistics ==
As of 25 November 2023

Team	From	To	Record				
Team	From	To	G	W	D	L	Win %
Manisaspor	16 August 2011	25 January 2012	22	6	7	9	27.27
Manisaspor	15 July 2013	30 June 2014	37	16	6	15	43.24
Gençlerbirliği	29 May 2014	10 July 2014	0	0	0	0	—
Balıkesirspor	5 December 2014	27 April 2015	17	3	6	8	17.65
Karşıyaka	1 October 2015	14 December 2015	10	3	2	5	30.00
Elazığspor	4 January 2016	15 January 2016	0	0	0	0	—
Kasımpaşa	16 September 2016	1 October 2018	86	39	14	33	45.35
Göztepe	10 December 2018	24 February 2019	12	4	2	6	33.33
Kasımpaşa	13 June 2019	1 December 2019	15	5	3	7	33.33
Yeni Malatyaspor	23 January 2020	1 March 2020	6	1	0	5	16.67
Kasımpaşa	4 April 2023		22	9	4	9	40.91
Total			221	86	38	97	38.91
