= Mustafa Kaplan =

Turkish footballer and manager

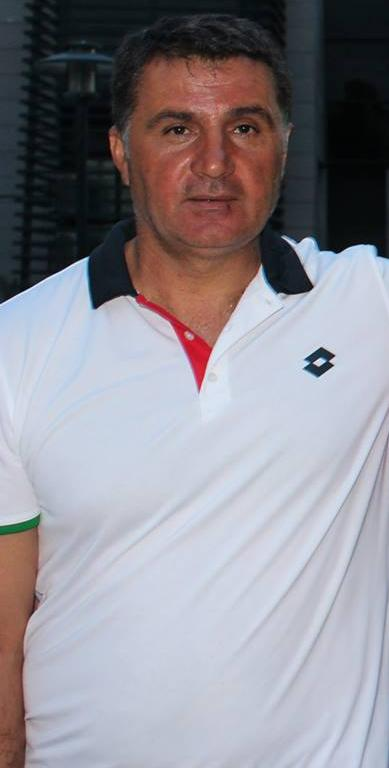

Personal information
- Date of birth: 2 September 1967 (age 59)
- Place of birth: Kırşehir, Turkey
- Height: 1.80 m (5 ft 11 in)
- Position: Forward

Senior career*
Years	Team	Apps	(Gls)
1990–1991	Alanyaspor	4	(0)
1990–1991	→Edremit Belediyespor (loan)	15	(0)
1991	Bayburtspor	3	(0)
1991–1992	Kırşehirspor	15	(4)
1992–1993	Eskişehir Demirspor	7	(0)
1993–1994	Ankara Demirspor	11	(3)
1994–1995	Yozgatspor	8	(2)
1995–1006	Altındağ Belediyespor	18	(3)
1996	Çubukspor	9	(5)
1996–1997	ASKI Spor	3	(0)
1997	Çubukspor	6	(0)
1997	Tarımspor	3	(0)
1997–1998	Ankara Demirspor	8	(1)

Managerial career
- 2003–2006: Ankaragücü (assistant)
- 2006–2008: Gençlerbirliği (assistant)
- 2008–2009: Ankaragücü (assistant)
- 2010–2012: Gençlerbirliği (assistant)
- 2012–2013: Ankaragücü
- 2013–2014: Hacettepe
- 2014: Gençlerbirliği (assistant)
- 2014: Ankaragücü
- 2015: Hacettepe
- 2015: Gençlerbirliği (assistant)
- 2015–2016: Hacettepe
- 2016: Giresunspor
- 2017–2018: Hacettepe
- 2019: Ankaragücü (assistant)
- 2019: Ankaragücü
- 2019: Gençlerbirliği
- 2019: Ankaragücü
- 2020: Gençlerbirliği (sporting director)
- 2020–2021: Gençlerbirliği
- 2022: Adanaspor
- 2023: Giresunspor
- 2023–2024: Adanaspor
- 2025: Ankaragücü
- * Club domestic league appearances and goals

Mustafa Kaplan (born 2 September 1967) is a Turkish football manager and former player.

== Career ==
Kaplan had a middling career in Turkey, from 1990 to 1998. He then went into management as assistant manager at Ankaragücü in 2003. In 2006, he was named the assistant manager at Gençlerbirliği. After a couple more stints as assistant manager, he was named the first team manager of Ankaragücü in 2012. He spent most of his career as manager between Ankaragücü and Gençlerbirliği, and Hacettepe. He most recently had a stints as manager at Gençlerbirliği from 2020 to 31 January 2021.
