= Balıkesirspor =

Association football club

- Full name: Balıkesirspor Kulübü Derneği
- Nicknames: Balkes, Balkesler
- Founded: 6 June 1966
- Ground: Balıkesir Atatürk Stadium; Balıkesir, Turkey
- Capacity: 15,800
- Chairman: Abdullah Bekki
- Manager: İsmail Ertekin
- League: TFF Third League
- 2022–23: TFF Second League Red Group, 17th of 20
- Website: https://www.balikesirspor.com.tr/
Home colours	Away colours	Third colours

Balıkesirspor is a Turkish club based in Balıkesir. Established in 1966, the football team played in the Süper Lig after achieving promotion having finished as runners-up of the TFF First League in 2013–14. The team's previous promotion was 40 years before that. Their stadium, the all-seater Balıkesir Atatürk Stadium, has a capacity of 15,800.

== History ==
Balıkesirspor was founded on 6 June 1966 and started to compete in Turkish Second Football League in 1967–68 season. On 20 August 1967, it played its first competitive match against Malatyaspor and won 3–1. Kadir Gürsoy scored the first goal of the club in that match. The club won its first title in 1974–75 season under the management of Rıdvan Kösemihal and promoted to Turkish First Football League, the top level of Turkish Football. Despite being 4th in the first half of the season, Balıkesirspor finished its first season in the top level in the last place and was relegated to Second League.

After competing in Second League for 10 consecutive seasons, the club was relegated to Third League, the third level of Turkish football at that time. In the 1991–92 season, Balıkesirspor earned promotion after finishing first in Third League Group 7. They made the play-offs in the 1995–96 season by finishing their group first, but lost the chance for returning to the top tier after being defeated by Karabükspor. The following season, Balıkesirspor was one of the relegated sides. Another relegation came in 2001, which meant the club dropped to the amateur leagues.

The promotion back to professional football in 2006 marked the starting point of the revival of the club. Following four promotions in eight seasons, Balıkesirspor has returned to the top flight after 39 years.

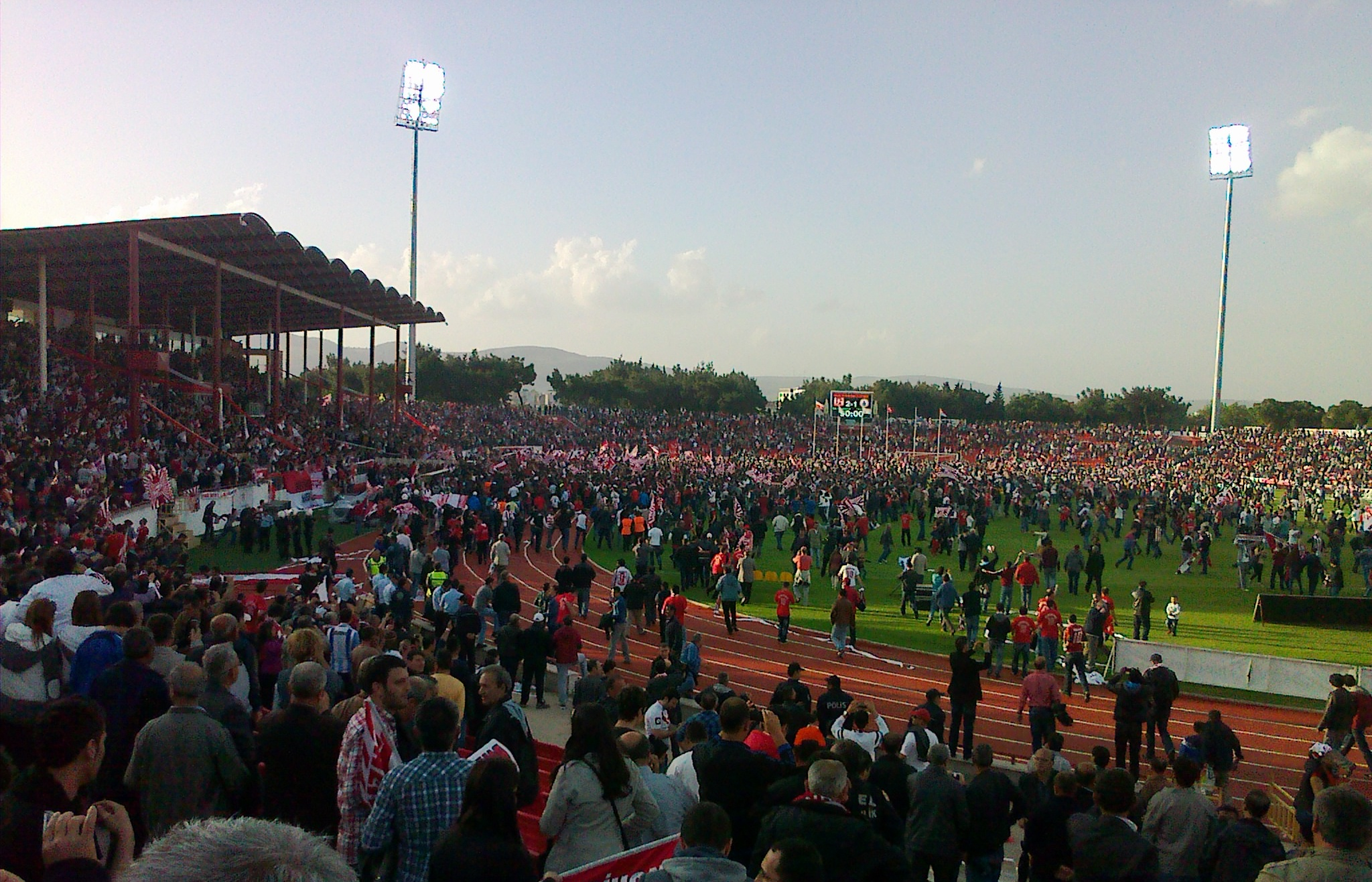
Balıkesirspor fans celebrating promotion to Süper Lig, in 2014

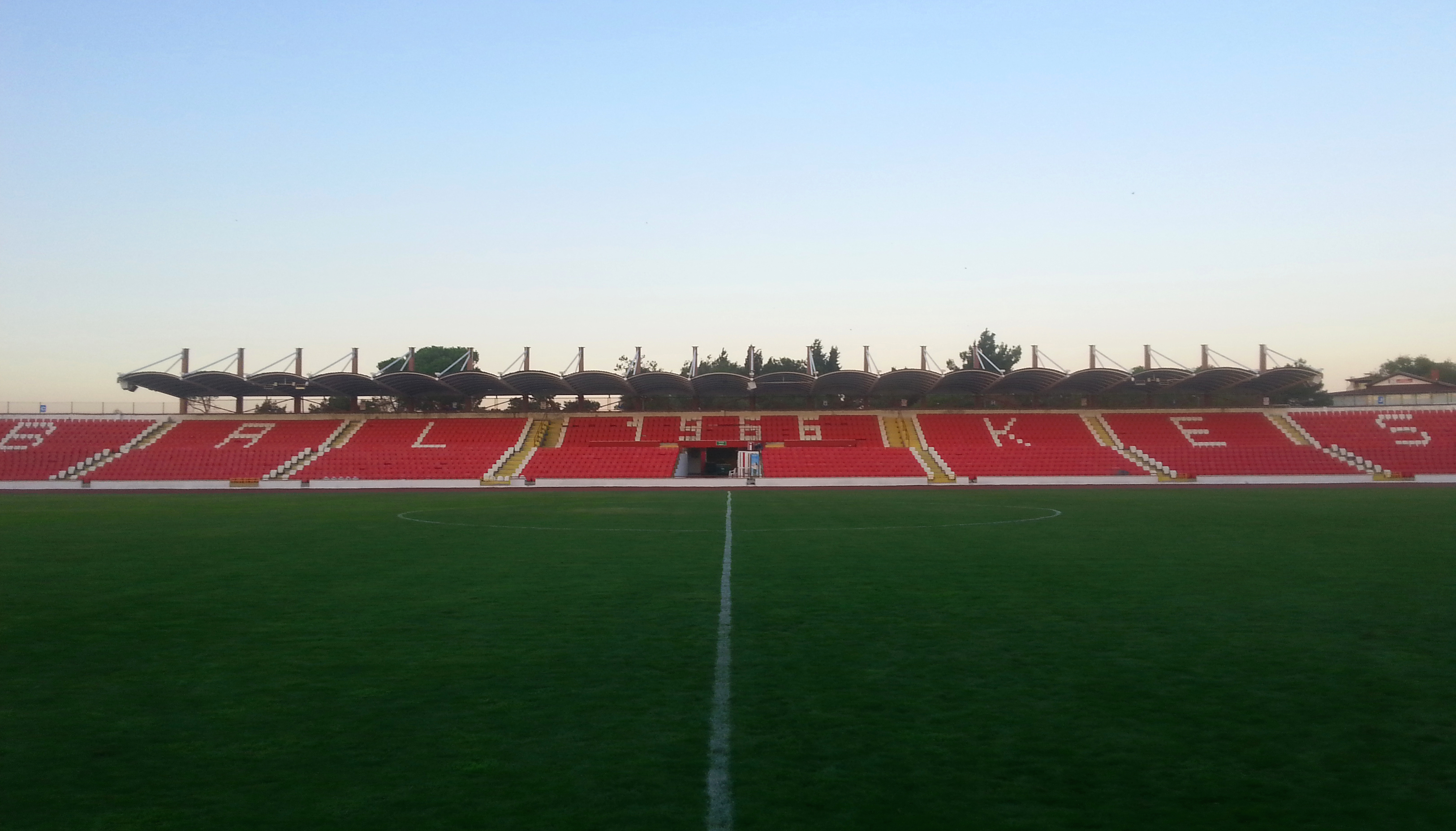
Balıkesir Atatürk Stadium, ground of Balıkesirspor

== Current squad ==
As of 21 November 2024

Note: Flags indicate national team as defined under FIFA eligibility rules; some limited exceptions apply. Players may hold more than one non-FIFA nationality.

No.	Pos.	Nation	Player
1	GK	TUR	Hüseyin Altıntaş
2	DF	AUT	Muhammet Araz
3	DF	TUR	Ahmet Gülay
5	DF	TUR	Kağan Kayalı
6	MF	TUR	Samet Sargın
7	FW	TUR	Celal Emir Dede
8	DF	TUR	Özer Özdemir
9	FW	TUR	Bertuğ Bayar
10	MF	TUR	Sedat Kurnaz
15	MF	TUR	Asım Hamzaçebi
16	DF	TUR	Şahin Şafakoğlu

No.	Pos.	Nation	Player
19	FW	TUR	Artun Akçakın
21	MF	TUR	Serdar Güncü
22	DF	TUR	Tayfun Kırca
26	GK	TUR	Yiğit Berber
27	MF	TUR	Mert Tekin
32	MF	TUR	Ali Karakaya
48	GK	TUR	Doğukan Özçimen
56	DF	TUR	Yiğit Epözdemir
68	DF	TUR	Volkan Altınsoy
80	MF	TUR	Muhammed Demirci

== Competitions ==
- 1966–75: Turkey Second League
- 1975–76: Turkey First League
- 1976–86: Turkey Second League
- 1986–92: Turkey Third League
- 1992–97: Turkey Second League
- 1997–01: Turkey Third League
- 2001–06: Amatör Futbol Ligleri
- 2006–10: TFF Third League
- 2010–13: TFF Second League
- 2013–14: TFF First League
- 2014–15: Süper Lig
- 2015–22: TFF First League
- 2022–23: TFF Second League
- 2023–present: TFF Third League

== Honours ==
Balıkesirspor
Medal record

Football

Representing Balıkesirspor

Turkish Leagues
Gold medal – first place	Turkish 2nd League	1974–75
Gold medal – first place	Turkish 3rd League 9th Group	1991–92
Gold medal – first place	Regional Amateur League	2005–06
Silver medal – second place	TFF 3rd League	2009–10
Gold medal – first place	TFF 2nd League	2012–13
Silver medal – second place	TFF 1st League	2013–14

- 1974–75: TFF Second League White Group Champion
- 1991–92: TFF Third League 9th Group Champion
- 2005–06: Turkish Regional Amateur League 8th Group Champion
- 2012–13: TFF Second League White Group Champion
