= 2020–21 Denizlispor season =

Denizlispor
2020–21 season
- Chairman: Ali Çetin
- Manager: Robert Prosinečki (until 25 November 2020); Yalçın Koşukavak (from 15 December 2020 to 28 January 2021); Hakan Kutlu (from 29 January 2021 to 18 April 2021); Ali Tandoğan (from 19 April 2021)
- Stadium: Denizli Atatürk Stadium
- Süper Lig: 21st (relegated)
- Turkish Cup: Fourth round
- Top goalscorer: League: Hugo Rodallega (14); All: Hugo Rodallega (14)
Home colours	Away colours	Third colours

The 2020–21 season was the 54th season of Denizlispor in existence and the club's second consecutive season in the top flight of Turkish football. In addition to the domestic league, Denizlispor participated in this season's edition of the Turkish Cup. The season covers the period from July 2020 to 30 June 2021.

== Players ==
=== Current squad ===
N	Pos.	Nat.	Name	Age	EU	Since	App	Goals	Ends	Transfer fee	Notes
1	GK	(Turkey)	Hüseyin Altıntaş	26	Non-EU	2017	7	0	2022	Free	
2	DF	(Portugal)	Tiago Lopes	32	EU	2019	25	0	2021	Free	
3	DF	(Turkey)	Muhammet Özkal	21	Non-EU	2020 (Winter)	4	1	2024	Free	
5	MF	(Turkey)	Kubilay Aktaş	26	EU	2021 (Winter)	0	0	2021	Free	Second nationality: French
6	MF	(Germany)	Marvin Bakalorz	31	EU	2020	0	0	2022	Free	
7	FW	(Colombia)	Hugo Rodallega (Captain)	35	Non-EU	2019	32	6	2021	Free	
8	MF	(Poland)	Radosław Murawski	27	EU	2019	35	5	2021	Free	
9	FW	(Mali)	Hadi Sacko	27	EU	2019	32	4	2021	Free	Second nationality: French
11	FW	(Bosnia and Herzegovina)	Muris Mešanović	30	EU	2020	0	0	2021	Free	
14	DF	(Togo)	Mathieu Dossevi	33	EU	2020	0	0	2021	Free	Second nationality: French
15	DF	(Turkey)	Oğuz Yılmaz	28	Non-EU	2019 (Winter)	39	0	2023	Free	
17	MF	(Iraq)	Ahmed Yasin	30	EU	2021 (Winter)	0	0	2021	Free	Second nationality: Swedish
19	GK	(Turkey)	Cenk Gönen	33	Non-EU	2020	44	0	2021	Free	Originally from youth system
20	MF	(Turkey)	Recep Niyaz	25	Non-EU	2018	88	24	2023	Free	Originally from youth system
22	DF	(Turkey)	Mustafa Yumlu	33	Non-EU	2019	28	3	2022	Free	
23	DF	(Turkey)	Sakıb Aytaç	29	Non-EU	2020	0	0	2021	Free	
25	FW	(Kosovo)	Veton Tusha	18	Non-EU	2021 (Winter)	0	0	2024	Youth system	Second nationality: Macedonian
26	DF	(Turkey)	Görkem Can	21	EU	2021 (Winter)	0	0	2021	Free	Second nationality: German
28	FW	(Chile)	Ángelo Sagal	28	Non-EU	2020	0	0	2022	Free	
29	GK	(Romania)	Costel Pantilimon	34	EU	2020	0	0	2021	Free	
30	DF	(Tunisia)	Ayman Ben Mohamed	26	EU	2021 (Winter)	0	0	2021	Free	Other nationalities: English, Irish
42	MF	(United States)	Mix Diskerud	30	EU	2021 (Winter)	0	0	2021	Undisclosed	Second nationality: Norwegian
60	DF	(Turkey)	Özgür Çek	30	Non-EU	2020 (Winter)	14	0	2022	Free	
61	FW	(Turkey)	Ali Yavuz Kol	20	Non-EU	2021 (Winter)	0	0	2021	€7K	
70	MF	(Turkey)	Hasan Ayaroğlu	26	Non-EU	2021 (Winter)	0	0	2021	Free	
76	DF	(Turkey)	Özer Özdemir	23	EU	2020	0	0	2024	Free	Second nationality: French
91	DF	(Brazil)	Fabiano	29	Non-EU	2020	0	0	2022	Free	
Players sold or loaned out after the start of the season
4	DF	(Serbia)	Neven Subotić	32	EU	2020	5	1	2022	Free	Second nationality: German
10	MF	(Morocco)	Ismaïl Aissati	32	EU	2018 (Winter)	93	3	2021	€60K	Second nationality: Dutch
21	DF	(Morocco)	Zakarya Bergdich	31	EU	2019	23	0	2021	Free	Second nationality: French
24	MF	(Argentina)	Fede Varela	24	EU	2020	0	0	2022	Free	Second nationality: Spanish

- Last updated: 10 September 2020
- Source: Denizlispor.org.tr
- Ordered by squad number.

== Transfers ==
=== In ===
No.	Pos.	Nat.	Name	Age	Moving from	Type	Transfer window	Ends	Transfer fee	Source
	MF	(Turkey)	Emre Sağlık	22	Ağrı 1970 SK	End of loan	Summer	2021	Free	
	MF	(Turkey)	Kadir Kurt	21	Amed	End of loan	Summer	2020	Free	
19	GK	(Turkey)	Cenk Gönen	32	Alanyaspor	Transfer	Summer	2021	Free	
6	GK	(Germany)	Marvin Bakalorz	30	(Germany) Hannover 96	Transfer	Summer	2022	Free	
11	FW	(Bosnia and Herzegovina)	Muris Mešanović	30	(Czech Republic) Mladá Boleslav	Loan	Summer	2021	Free	
28	FW	(Chile)	Ángelo Sagal	27	(Mexico) Pachuca	Transfer	Summer	2022	Free	
29	GK	(Romania)	Costel Pantilimon	33	(England) Nottingham Forest	Transfer	Summer	2021	Free	
23	DF	(Turkey)	Sakıb Aytaç	28	Yeni Malatyaspor	Transfer	Summer	2021	Free	
76	DF	(Turkey)	Özer Özdemir	22	Yeni Malatyaspor	Transfer	Summer	2024	Free	
91	DF	(Brazil)	Fabiano	28	(Brazil) Palmeiras	Transfer	Summer	2022	Free	
4	DF	(Serbia)	Neven Subotić	31	(Germany) Union Berlin	Transfer	Summer	2022	Free	
24	MF	(Argentina)	Fede Varela	24	(Spain) Leganés	Transfer	Summer	2022	Free	
14	MF	(Togo)	Mathieu Dossevi	32	(France) Toulouse	Transfer	Summer	2021	Free	
25	FW	(Kosovo)	Veton Tusha	18	Youth system	Transfer	Winter	2024	Youth system	
17	MF	(Iraq)	Ahmed Yasin	29	(Sweden) Häcken	Transfer	Winter	2021	Free	
42	MF	(United States)	Mix Diskerud	30	(England) Manchester City	Transfer	Winter	2021	Undisclosed	
5	MF	(Turkey)	Kubilay Aktaş	25	Gaziantep	Transfer	Winter	2021	Free	
	DF	(Turkey)	Görkem Can	20	(Netherlands) Groningen	Transfer	Winter	2023	Free	
70	MF	(Turkey)	Hasan Ayaroğlu	25	Alanyaspor	Transfer	Winter	2021	Free	
61	FW	(Turkey)	Ali Yavuz Kol	20	Galatasaray	Loan	Summer	2021	€9K	
30	DF	(Tunisia)	Ayman Ben Mohamed	26	(France) Le Havre	Loan	Summer	2021	Free	

=== Out ===
N	Pos.	Nat.	Name	Age	Moving to	Type	Transfer window	Transfer fee	Source
11	MF	(Turkey)	Sedat Şahintürk	24	Beşiktaş	End of loan	Summer	Free	
90	MF	(Ghana)	Isaac Sackey	26	Alanyaspor	End of loan	Summer	Free	
19	FW	(Colombia)	Óscar Estupiñán	23	(Portugal) Vitória Guimarães	End of loan	Summer	Free	
77	FW	(The Gambia)	Modou Barrow	28	(England) Reading	End of loan	Summer	Free	
23	MF	(Nigeria)	Ogenyi Onazi	27	(Denmark) SønderjyskE	End of contact	Summer	Free	
55	DF	(Tunisia)	Syam Ben Youssef	31	(Romania) CFR Cluj	End of contact	Summer	Free	
61	DF	(Turkey)	Zeki Yavru	28	Yeni Malatyaspor	End of contact	Summer	Free	
70	MF	(Turkey)	Olcay Şahan	33	Yeni Malatyaspor	End of contact	Summer	Free	
6	MF	(Cameroon)	Marc Kibong Mbamba	32	Ankaraspor	End of contact	Summer	Free	
25	GK	(Turkey)	Tolgahan Acar	34	Giresunspor	End of contact	Summer	Free	
27	DF	(Turkey)	Emre Sağlık	22	Kızılcabölükspor	Loan	Summer	Free	
4	DF	(Turkey)	Kadir Kurt	21	Kızılcabölükspor	Loan	Summer	Free	
72	DF	(Turkey)	Murathan Sütcü	20	Kızılcabölükspor	Loan	Summer	Free	
10	MF	(Morocco)	Ismaïl Aissati	32	Adana Demirspor	Contract termination	Winter	Free	
4	DF	(Serbia)	Neven Subotić	32	(Austria) SCR Altach	Contract termination	Winter	Free	
24	MF	(Argentina)	Fede Varela	24	(Bulgaria) CSKA Sofia	Contract termination	Winter	Free	
21	DF	(Morocco)	Zakarya Bergdich	32	BB Erzurumspor	Mutual agreement	Winter	Free	
88	MF	(Turkey)	Alihan Kalkan	19	Sancaktepe FK	Loan	Winter	Free	
65	MF	(Turkey)	Mert Sarıkuş	21	Vanspor FK	Loan	Winter	Free	

== Statistics ==
No.	PMF.	Nat.	Player	Süper Lig						Turkish Cup						Total					
No.	PMF.	Nat.	Player	Ap	G	A	Booked	(yellow card) (red card)	Sent off (straight red)	Ap	G	A	Booked	(yellow card) (red card)	Sent off (straight red)	Ap	G	A	Booked	(yellow card) (red card)	Sent off (straight red)
1	GK	(Turkey)	Hüseyin Altıntaş	3	-	-	-	-	-	-	-	-	-	-	-	3	-	-	-	-	-
2	DF	(Portugal)	Tiago Lopes	24	-	2	4	-	-	-	-	-	-	-	-	24	-	2	4	-	-
3	DF	(Turkey)	Muhammet Özkal	18	-	-	1	-	-	1	-	-	-	-	-	19	-	-	1	-	-
5	MF	(Turkey)	Kubilay Aktaş	14	-	-	3	-	-	-	-	-	-	-	-	14	-	-	3	-	-
6	MF	(Germany)	Marvin Bakalorz	31	1	1	8	-	-	1	-	-	1	-	-	32	1	1	9	-	-
7	FW	(Colombia)	Hugo Rodallega (captain)	37	14	3	9	1	-	-	-	-	-	-	-	37	14	3	9	1	-
8	MF	(Poland)	Radosław Murawski	32	1	2	11	2	-	1	-	-	-	-	-	33	1	2	11	2	-
9	FW	(Mali)	Hadi Sacko	27	2	2	3	1	-	1	1	-	-	-	-	28	3	2	3	1	-
11	FW	(Bosnia and Herzegovina)	Muris Mešanović	36	6	1	5	-	-	1	-	-	-	-	-	37	6	1	5	-	-
14	MF	(Togo)	Mathieu Dossevi	18	-	2	-	-	-	-	-	-	-	-	-	18	-	2	-	-	-
15	DF	(Turkey)	Oğuz Yılmaz	18	1	-	4	-	-	-	-	-	-	-	-	18	1	-	4	-	-
16	MF	(Turkey)	Asım Aksungur	-	-	-	-	-	-	-	-	-	-	-	-	-	-	-	-	-	-
17	MF	(Iraq)	Ahmed Yasin	7	-	-	-	-	-	-	-	-	-	-	-	7	-	-	-	-	-
19	GK	(Turkey)	Cenk Gönen	16	-	-	1	-	-	1	-	-	-	-	-	17	-	-	1	-	-
20	MF	(Turkey)	Recep Niyaz	28	5	2	3	-	-	-	-	-	-	-	-	28	5	2	3	-	-
22	DF	(Turkey)	Mustafa Yumlu	27	-	1	4	-	-	-	-	-	-	-	-	27	-	1	4	-	-
23	DF	(Turkey)	Sakıb Aytaç	17	1	1	4	-	-	-	-	-	-	-	-	17	1	1	4	-	-
25	FW	(Kosovo)	Veton Tusha	11	2	-	-	-	-	-	-	-	-	-	-	11	2	-	-	-	-
26	DF	(Turkey)	Görkem Can	3	-	-	-	-	-	-	-	-	-	-	-	3	-	-	-	-	-
27	MF	(Turkey)	Hüseyin Furkan Uslu	1	-	-	-	-	-	-	-	-	-	-	-	1	-	-	-	-	-
28	FW	(Chile)	Ángelo Sagal	35	1	5	4	-	-	1	-	-	-	-	-	36	1	5	4	-	-
30	DF	(Tunisia)	Ayman Ben Mohamed	7	-	-	-	-	-	-	-	-	-	-	-	7	-	-	-	-	-
33	MF	(Turkey)	Ferhat Erdoğan	1	-	-	-	-	-	-	-	-	-	-	-	1	-	-	-	-	-
35	MF	(Turkey)	Mehmet Ali Ulaman	1	-	-	-	-	-	-	-	-	-	-	-	1	-	-	-	-	-
37	MF	(Turkey)	Alaattin Öner	1	-	-	-	-	-	-	-	-	-	-	-	1	-	-	-	-	-
42	MF	(United States)	Mix Diskerud	17	2	-	1	-	-	-	-	-	-	-	-	18	2	-	1	-	-
60	DF	(Turkey)	Özgür Çek	7	-	-	-	-	-	-	-	-	-	-	-	7	-	-	-	-	-
61	FW	(Turkey)	Ali Yavuz Kol	8	-	-	2	1	-	-	-	-	-	-	-	8	-	-	2	1	-
37	MF	(Turkey)	Mert Sarıkuş	1	-	-	-	-	-	-	-	-	-	-	-	1	-	-	-	-	-
70	MF	(Turkey)	Hasan Ayaroğlu	19	-	1	2	-	-	-	-	-	-	-	-	19	-	1	2	-	-
76	DF	(Turkey)	Özer Özdemir	25	1	1	1	-	1	1	-	-	-	-	-	26	1	1	1	-	1
77	DF	(Turkey)	Emirhan Kascıoğlu	3	-	-	1	-	-	-	-	-	-	-	-	3	-	-	1	-	-
81	DF	(Turkey)	Emre Yıldırım	1	-	-	-	-	-	-	-	-	-	-	-	1	-	-	-	-	-
88	MF	(Turkey)	Alihan Kalkan	-	-	-	-	-	-	1	-	-	-	-	-	1	-	-	-	-	-
91	DF	(Brazil)	Fabiano	33	-	-	8	-	-	1	-	-	-	-	-	34	-	-	8	-	-
94	MF	(Turkey)	Eren Kıryolcu	1	-	-	-	-	-	-	-	-	-	-	-	1	-	-	-	-	-
99	GK	(Turkey)	Abdulkadir Sünger	7	-	-	-	-	-	-	-	-	-	-	-	7	-	-	-	-	-
4	DF	(Serbia)	Neven Subotić	5	1	-	-	-	-	-	-	-	-	-	-	5	1	-	-	-	-
10	MF	(Morocco)	Ismaïl Aissati	13	-	-	-	-	-	-	-	-	-	-	-	13	-	-	-	-	-
21	DF	(Morocco)	Zakarya Bergdich	17	-	-	4	-	-	1	-	-	-	-	-	18	-	-	4	-	-
24	MF	(Argentina)	Fede Varela	7	-	-	-	-	-	1	-	-	-	-	-	8	-	-	-	-	-
29	GK	(Romania)	Costel Pantilimon	15	-	-	1	-	-	-	-	-	-	-	-	15	-	-	1	-	-
65	MF	(Turkey)	Mert Sarıkuş	1	-	-	-	-	-	-	-	-	-	-	-	1	-	-	-	-	-
88	FW	(Turkey)	Alihan Kalkan	-	-	-	-	-	-	1	-	-	-	-	-	1	-	-	-	-	-

== Pre-season and friendlies ==
Win Draw Loss Fixtures

=== Pre-season ===
29 August 2020 Friendly	Denizlispor	2–3	Gaziantep	Afyonkarahisar
17:30	Radosław Murawski 35' (pen.); Alihan Kalkan 86'		39' (pen.), 52' Alexandru Maxim; 59' Paweł Olkowski	Stadium: Zafer Stadium

3 September 2020 Friendly	Denizlispor	v	Bandırmaspor	Afyonkarahisar
17:00				Stadium: Zafer Stadium

=== Mid-season ===
10 October 2020 Friendly	Antalyaspor	1–1	Denizlispor	Antalya
17:30	Adis Jahović 88' (pen.)		85' Muris Mešanović	Stadium: Regnum Carya

== Competitions ==
=== Overview ===
Competition	First match	Last match	Starting round	Final position	Record							
Competition	First match	Last match	Starting round	Final position	Pld	W	D	L	GF	GA	GD	Win %
Süper Lig	12 September 2020	15 May 2021	Matchday 1	21st	40	6	10	24	38	77	−39	15.00
Turkish Cup	24 November 2020	24 November 2020	Fourth round	Fourth round	1	0	0	1	1	2	−1	0.00
Total					41	6	10	25	39	79	−40	14.63

Source: Competitions

=== Süper Lig ===
==== League table ====
Pos	Team	Pld	W	D	L	GF	GA	GD	Pts	Qualification or relegation
17	Kayserispor	40	9	14	17	35	52	−17	41	
18	BB Erzurumspor (R)	40	10	10	20	44	68	−24	40	Relegation to TFF First League
19	Ankaragücü (R)	40	10	8	22	46	65	−19	38	Relegation to TFF First League
20	Gençlerbirliği (R)	40	10	8	22	44	76	−32	38	Relegation to TFF First League
21	Denizlispor (R)	40	6	10	24	38	77	−39	28	Relegation to TFF First League

Source: Süper Lig, Soccerway
Rules for classification: 1) Points; 2) Head-to-head points; 3) Head-to-head goal difference; 4) Head-to-head goals scored; 5) Goal difference; 6) Goals scored; 7) Play-off.
(R) Relegated

==== Results summary ====
Overall								Home						Away					
Pld	W	D	L	GF	GA	GD	Pts	W	D	L	GF	GA	GD	W	D	L	GF	GA	GD
40	6	10	24	38	77	−39	28	4	6	10	17	27	−10	2	4	14	21	50	−29

Source: TFF.org

==== Results by round ====
Round	1	2	3	4	5	6	7	8	9	10	11	12	13	14	15	16	17	18	19	20	21	22	23	24	25	26	27	28	29	30	31	32	33	34	35	36	37	38	39	40	41	42
Ground	A	H	A	H	A	H		A	H	A	H	A	H	A	H	A	H	A	H	A	H	H	A	H	A	H	A		H	A	H	A	H	A	H	A	H	A	H	A	H	A
Result	L	D	L	D	W	L	B	L	L	D	L	L	W	W	L	D	L	D	L	L	L	W	L	D	L	W	L	B	W	L	D	L	D	L	L	D	D	L	L	L	L	L
Position	21	18	20	19	16	19	20	21	21	19	20	21	20	17	19	19	19	20	21	21	21	21	21	21	21	19	19	20	20	20	21	21	21	21	21	21	21	21	21	21	21	21

Source: TFF.org
A = Away; H = Home; B = Bye; W = Win; D = Draw; L = Loss

==== Matches ====
12 September 2020 1	Göztepe	5–1	Denizlispor	İzmir
20:00 TRT (UTC+3)	Alpaslan Öztürk 10' (pen.); Atınç Nukan 25'; Halil Akbunar 43'; Márcio Mossoró 50'; Zlatko Tripić 71'	Report	(yellow card) 9' Hugo Rodallega; (yellow card) 24' Radosław Murawski; (yellow card) 28' Mustafa Yumlu; 62' Oğuz Yılmaz	Stadium: Gürsel Aksel Stadium; Attendance: 0 Referee: Tugay Kaan Numanoğlu; Assistant referees: Esat Sancaktar, Alpaslan Dedeş; Fourth official: Alper Çetin

19 September 2020 2	Denizlispor	0–0	Trabzonspor	Denizli
16:00 TRT (UTC+3)	Marvin Bakalorz (yellow card) 19'; Hadi Sacko (yellow card) 67' (yellow-red card) 68'	Report		Stadium: Atatürk Stadium; Attendance: 0 Referee: Volkan Bayarslan; Assistant referees: Süleyman Özay, Deniz Caner Özaral; Fourth official: Burak Şeker

28 September 2020 3	Antalyaspor	1–0	Denizlispor	Antalya
20:00 TRT (UTC+3)	Veysel Sarı 58'	Report	(yellow card) 80' Mustafa Yumlu; (yellow card) 90' Oğuz Yılmaz	Stadium: Antalya Stadium; Attendance: 0 Referee: Halis Özkahya; Assistant referees: Özgür Ertem, Hüsnü Emre Çelimli; Fourth official: Çağdaş Altay

4 October 2020 4	Denizlispor	0–0	Konyaspor	Denizli
13:00 TRT (UTC+3)	Tiago Lopes (yellow card) 90'	Report		Stadium: Atatürk Stadium; Attendance: 0 Referee: Hüseyin Göçek; Assistant referees: Bahattin Duran, Kemal Mavi; Fourth official: Murat Erdoğan

19 October 2020 5	Gençlerbirliği	1–2	Denizlispor	Ankara
20:00 TRT (UTC+3)	Robert Piris (yellow card) 45'; Daniel Candeias 90'	Report	22' Neven Subotić; 45' Hugo Rodallega	Stadium: Eryaman Stadium; Attendance: 0 Referee: Mert Güzenge; Assistant referees: Candaş Elbil, Gökhan Barcın; Fourth official: Emre Malok

26 October 2020 6	Denizlispor	2–3	Beşiktaş	Denizli
20:00 TRT (UTC+3)	Marvin Bakalorz (yellow card) 27'; Oğuz Yılmaz (yellow card) 39'; Muris Mešanović 76'; Hadi Sacko 90+4'	Report	13' Atiba Hutchinson; (yellow card) 25' Dorukhan Toköz; (yellow card) 35' Valentin Rosier; 39' (pen.) Vincent Aboubakar; 48' Cyle Larin; (yellow card) 58' Domagoj Vida; (red card) 67' Josef de Souza	Stadium: Atatürk Stadium; Attendance: 0 Referee: Alper Ulusoy; Assistant referees: İbrahim Çağlar Uyarcan, İlker Takpak; Fourth official: Yasin Kol

7	Bye

8 November 2020 8	Yeni Malatyaspor	2–0	Denizlispor	Malatya
13:30 TRT (UTC+3)	Kubilay Kanatsızkuş 7'; Afriyie Acquah 17'; Jody Lukoki (yellow card) 56'	Report	(yellow card) 39' Fabiano Leismann; (yellow card) 74' Radosław Murawski	Stadium: Malatya Stadium; Attendance: 0 Referee: Mete Kalkavan; Assistant referees: Erdem Bayık, Mehmet Yıldırım; Fourth official: Çağdaş Altay

21 November 2020 9	Denizlispor	0–1	Gaziantep	Denizli
16:00 TRT (UTC+3)	Zakarya Bergdich (yellow card) 50'; Radosław Murawski (yellow card) 72'	Report	25' Kenan Özer; (yellow card) 44' Jean-Armel Kana-Biyik; (yellow card) 74' Alin Toșca; (yellow card) 90' Furkan Soyalp	Stadium: Atatürk Stadium; Attendance: 0 Referee: Atilla Karaoğlan; Assistant referees: Erkan Akbulut, Sezgin Çınar; Fourth official: Kutluhan Bilgiç

28 November 2020 10	İstanbul Başakşehir	3–3	Denizlispor	Istanbul
16:00 TRT (UTC+3)	Fredrik Gulbrandsen 11', 21'; Demba Ba 59'; Nacer Chadli (yellow card) 90'; Martin Škrtel (yellow card) 90+6'	Report	(yellow card) 20' Tiago Lopes; 62' Özer Özdemir; 90+2' Hugo Rodallega; 90+7' (pen.) Radosław Murawski	Stadium: Başakşehir Fatih Terim Stadium; Attendance: 0 Referee: Arda Kardeşler; Assistant referees: Erdem Bayık, İbrahim Bozbey; Fourth official: Emre Malok

6 December 2020 11	Denizlispor	0–2	Fenerbahçe	Denizli
19:00 TRT (UTC+3)	Zakarya Bergdich (yellow card) 22'; Marvin Bakalorz (yellow card) 32'; Hugo Rodallega (yellow card) 86'	Report	9' Papiss Cissé; 40' Gökhan Gönül; (yellow card) 53' (yellow-red card) 54' Serdar Aziz; (yellow card) 55' Ozan Tufan; (yellow card) 86' Caner Erkin	Stadium: Atatürk Stadium; Attendance: 0 Referee: Ali Palabıyık; Assistant referees: Kerem Ersoy, Serkan Çimen; Fourth official: Kutluhan Bilgiç

11 December 2020 12	Kasımpaşa	3–2	Denizlispor	Istanbul
19:00 TRT (UTC+3)	Feyzi Yıldırım (yellow card) 3'; Mustafa Yumlu 36' (o.g.); Bengali-Fodé Koita 42' (yellow card) 45+1'; Kevin Varga 51'	Report	39' Recep Niyaz; (yellow card) 45+1' Marvin Bakalorz; 90+2' (pen.) Hugo Rodallega; (yellow card) 90+6' Mustafa Yumlu	Stadium: Recep Tayyip Erdoğan Stadium; Attendance: 0 Referee: Ramazan Keleş; Assistant referees: Mehmet Metin, Mehmet Salih Mazlum; Fourth official: Çağdaş Altay

20 December 2020 13	Denizlispor	1–0	Alanyaspor	Denizli
16:00 TRT (UTC+3)	Hugo Rodallega 9'; Fabiano Leismann (yellow card) 13'; Recep Niyaz (yellow card) 23'; Muris Mešanović (yellow card) 31'; Ángelo Sagal (yellow card) 41'; Radosław Murawski (yellow card) 51' (yellow-red card) 71'; Hadi Sacko (yellow card) 89'; Cenk Gönen (yellow card) 90+5'	Report	(yellow card) 41' Adam Bareiro; (yellow card) 51' Anastasios Bakasetas	Stadium: Atatürk Stadium; Attendance: 0 Referee: Suat Arslanboğa; Assistant referees: Yusuf Bozdoğan, Kamil Çetin; Fourth official: Emre Kargın

23 December 2020 14	BB Erzurumspor	1–2	Denizlispor	Erzurum
16:00 TRT (UTC+3)	Mitchell Donald (yellow card) 45'; Emrah Başsan 69'; Gökhan Kardeş (yellow card) 82'; Kaan Kanak (yellow card) 89'	Report	36', 55' Hugo Rodallega; (yellow card) 43' Hadi Sacko; (yellow card) 90' Muris Mešanović	Stadium: Kazım Karabekir Stadium; Attendance: 0 Referee: Hüseyin Göçek; Assistant referees: Alpaslan Dedeş, Mehmet Kısal; Fourth official: Caner Ak

27 December 2020 15	Denizlispor	1–2	Ankaragücü	Denizli
16:00 TRT (UTC+3)	Hugo Rodallega (yellow card) 37'; Özer Özdemir (yellow card) 71'; Recep Niyaz 80'	Report	(yellow card) 2' (goal) 21' Atakan Çankaya; 45' Daniel Łukasik; (yellow card) 63' Joseph Paintsil; (yellow card) 90+6' Jonathan Bolingi	Stadium: Atatürk Stadium; Attendance: 0 Referee: Özgür Yankaya; Assistant referees: Esat Sancaktar, Candaş Elbil; Fourth official: Atilla Karaoğlan

2 January 2021 16	Sivasspor	2–2	Denizlispor	Sivas
13:30 TRT (UTC+3)	Max Gradel 26' (pen.); Fayçal Fajr 45+1'; Isaac Cofie (yellow card) 79'	Report	(yellow card) 4' (goal) 90+3' Muris Mešanović; 17' Hugo Rodallega; (yellow card) 57' Radosław Murawski; (yellow card) 82' Zakarya Bergdich	Stadium: 4 Eylül Stadium; Attendance: 0 Referee: Erkan Özdamar; Assistant referees: Abdullah Bora Özkara, Mustafa Sönmez; Fourth official: Burak Pakkan

6 January 2021 17	Denizlispor	0–1	Kayserispor	Denizli
13:30 TRT (UTC+3)	Muhammet Özkal (yellow card) 34'; Fabiano Leismann (yellow card) 62'	Report	21' (yellow card) 34' Pedro Henrique; (yellow card) 33' Denis Alibec; (yellow card) 54' Yaw Ackah; (yellow card) 72' Daniel Avramovski; (yellow card) 88' Doğan Alemdar; (yellow card) 90+2' Nurettin Korkmaz	Stadium: Atatürk Stadium; Attendance: 0 Referee: Ali Şansalan; Assistant referees: Cevdet Kömürcüoğlu, Murat Altan; Fourth official: Alper Çetin

10 January 2021 18	Çaykur Rizespor	1–1	Denizlispor	Rize
16:00 TRT (UTC+3)	Yasin Pehlivan (yellow card) 2'; Yassine Meriah (yellow card) 85'; Kemal Rüzgar 90+3'	Report	9' (yellow card) 62' Hugo Rodallega; (yellow card) 39' Marvin Bakalorz; (yellow card) 59' Zakarya Bergdich; (yellow card) 71' Costel Pantilimon; (yellow card) 79' Tiago Lopes	Stadium: Çaykur Didi Stadium; Attendance: 0 Referee: Volkan Bayarslan; Assistant referees: İbrahim Çağlar Uyarcan, Mehmet Cem Hanoğlu; Fourth official: Direnç Tonusluoğlu

17 January 2021 19	Denizlispor	0–2	Hatayspor	Denizli
13:30 TRT (UTC+3)	Hadi Sacko (yellow card) 77'; Sakıb Aytaç (yellow card) 90'	Report	(yellow card) 32' (yellow-red card) 84' Jean-Claude Billong; (yellow card) 35' Rúben Ribeiro; 47' (o.g.) Muhammet Özkal; 78' (pen.) Mame Biram Diouf	Stadium: Atatürk Stadium; Attendance: 0 Referee: Koray Gençerler; Assistant referees: Mehmet Salih Mazlum, Bilal Gölen; Fourth official: Emre Malok

20 January 2021 20	Galatasaray	6–1	Denizlispor	Istanbul
19:00 TRT (UTC+3)	Taylan Antalyalı (yellow card) 6'; Emre Akbaba 8'; Sofiane Feghouli 17'; Ryan Donk 45'; Muhammet Özkal 60' (o.g.); Younès Belhanda 64'; Jesse Sekidika 90'	Report	(yellow card) 31' Hugo Rodallega; 48' Veton Tusha	Stadium: Türk Telekom Stadium; Attendance: 0 Referee: Suat Arslanboğa; Assistant referees: Abdullah Bora Özkara, Volkan Ahmet Narinç; Fourth official: Onur Özütoprak

24 January 2021 21	Denizlispor	1–2	Fatih Karagümrük	Denizli
16:00 TRT (UTC+3)	Ángelo Sagal (yellow card) 45'; Hugo Rodallega (yellow card) 61'; Mix Diskerud 87'; Radosław Murawski (yellow card) 90'	Report	(yellow card) 17' Gastón Campi; (yellow card) 24' Lucas Castro; (yellow card) 35' (goal) 44' Fabio Borini; 78' Alassane Ndao	Stadium: Atatürk Stadium; Attendance: 0 Referee: Erkan Özdamar; Assistant referees: Ali Saygın Ögel, İbrahim Bozbey; Fourth official: Caner Ak

31 January 2021 22	Denizlispor	2–1	Göztepe	Denizli
16:00 TRT (UTC+3)	Sakıb Aytaç (yellow card) 19'; Recep Niyaz 41'; Fabiano (yellow card) 54'; Muris Mešanović 79'	Report	(yellow card) 22' Obinna Nwobodo; 69' Marko Mihojević	Stadium: Atatürk Stadium; Attendance: 0 Referee: Sarper Barış Saka; Assistant referees: Mehmet Cem Satman, Candaş Elbil; Fourth official: Mustafa Kürşad Filiz

4 February 2021 23	Trabzonspor	1–0	Denizlispor	Trabzon
19:00 TRT (UTC+3)	Anastasios Bakasetas 61'	Report	Ángelo Sagal (yellow card) 18'; Recep Niyaz (yellow card) 21'; Mix Diskerud (yellow card) 64'	Stadium: Şenol Güneş Stadium; Attendance: 0 Referee: Tugay Kaan Numanoğlu; Assistant referees: Ceyhun Sesigüzel, Serkan Ok; Fourth official: Caner Ak

7 February 2021 24	Denizlispor	1–1	Antalyaspor	Denizli
16:00 TRT (UTC+3)	Rodallega 14'; Aktaş (yellow card) 45+2'; Murawski (yellow card) 67'	Report	73' (yellow card) 85' Bayrakdar; (yellow card) 90+4' Boffin	Stadium: Denizli Atatürk Stadium; Attendance: 0 Referee: Zorbay Küçük

14 February 2021 25	Konyaspor	2–0	Denizlispor	Konya
13:30 TRT (UTC+3)	Bardakcı 52'; Sekidika 80'	Report		Stadium: Konya Büyükşehir Stadium

20 February 2021 26	Denizlispor	1–0	Gençlerbirliği	Denizli
16:00 TRT (UTC+3)	Mešanović 19'	Report		Stadium: Atatürk Stadium

26 February 2021 27	Beşiktaş	3–0	Denizlispor	Istanbul
19:00 TRT (UTC+3)	Larin 22'; Aboubakar 38'; Ljajić 39'	Report	Sagal (yellow card) 54'	Stadium: Vodafone Park; Attendance: 0 Referee: Cüneyt Çakır

28	Bye

6 March 2021 29	Denizlispor	3–2	Yeni Malatyaspor	Denizli
16:00 TRT (UTC+3)		Report		Stadium: Atatürk Stadium

14 March 2021 30	Gaziantep	2–0	Denizlispor	Gaziantep
16:00 TRT (UTC+3)		Report		Stadium: Gaziantep Stadium

21 March 2021 31	Denizlispor	0–0	İstanbul Başakşehir	Denizli
16:00 TRT (UTC+3)		Report		Stadium: Atatürk Stadium

5 April 2021 32	Fenerbahçe	1–0	Denizlispor	Istanbul
19:00 TRT (UTC+3)		Report		Stadium: Şükrü Saracoğlu Stadium

8 April 2021 33	Denizlispor	1–1	Kasımpaşa	Denizli
16:00 TRT (UTC+3)		Report		Stadium: Atatürk Stadium

12 April 2021 34	Alanyaspor	3–2	Denizlispor	Alanya, Antalya
19:00 TRT (UTC+3)		Report		Stadium: Bahçeşehir Okulları Stadium

17 April 2021 35	Denizlispor	2–3	BB Erzurumspor	Denizli
13:30 TRT (UTC+3)		Report		Stadium: Atatürk Stadium

21 April 2021 36	Ankaragücü	1–1	Denizlispor	Ankara
16:00 TRT (UTC+3)		Report		Stadium: Eryaman Stadium

24 April 2021 37	Denizlispor	1–1	Sivasspor	Denizli
20:30 TRT (UTC+3)		Report		Stadium: Atatürk Stadium

28 April 2021 38	Kayserispor	6–3	Denizlispor	Kayseri
16:00 TRT (UTC+3)		Report		Stadium: Kadir Has Stadium

2 May 2021 39	Denizlispor	0–1	Çaykur Rizespor	Denizli
16:00 TRT (UTC+3)		Report		Stadium: Atatürk Stadium

8 May 2021 40	Hatayspor	1–0	Denizlispor	Hatay
20:30 TRT (UTC+3)		Report		Stadium: Hatay New Stadium

11 May 2021 41	Denizlispor	1–4	Galatasaray	Denizli
20:30 TRT (UTC+3)		Report		Stadium: Atatürk Stadium

15 May 2021 42	Fatih Karagümrük	5–1	Denizlispor	Istanbul
18:00 TRT (UTC+3)		Report		Stadium: Atatürk Olympic Stadium

=== Turkish Cup ===
24 November 2020 Fourth round	Denizlispor	1–2	Turgutluspor	Denizli
15:00 TRT (UTC+3)	Marvin Bakalorz (yellow card) 31'; Hadi Sacko 53'	Report	8' Muhammet Beşir; (yellow card) 60' Muhammed Rıdvan Özdemir; 69' (yellow card) 81' Sinan Özkara	Stadium: Atatürk Stadium; Referee: Kadir Sağlam; Assistant referees: Kemal Elmas, Anıl Usta; Fourth official: Demokrat Özgür Güneş
