= 2020–21 Süper Lig =

63rd season of top-tier Turkish football

Süper Lig
- Season: 2020–21
- Dates: 11 September 2020 – 15 May 2021
- Champions: Beşiktaş; 16th title
- Relegated: BB Erzurumspor; Ankaragücü; Gençlerbirliği; Denizlispor
- Champions League: Beşiktaş; Galatasaray
- Europa League: Fenerbahçe
- Europa Conference League: Trabzonspor; Sivasspor
- Matches: 420
- Goals: 1,136 (2.7 per match)
- Top goalscorer: Aaron Boupendza (22 goals)
- Biggest home win: Beşiktaş 7–0 Hatayspor (1 May 2021)
- Biggest away win: Antalyaspor 0–6 Hatayspor (29 December 2020)
- Highest scoring: Kayserispor 6–3 Denizlispor (28 April 2021); Gaziantep 4–5 Çaykur Rizespor (11 May 2021)
- Longest winning run: Galatasaray (8 matches)
- Longest unbeaten run: Sivasspor (19 matches)
- Longest winless run: Denizlispor; Yeni Malatyaspor (13 matches)
- Longest losing run: Ankaragücü (6 matches)

The 2020–21 Süper Lig, officially called the Süper Lig 2020–21 season, was the 63rd season of the Süper Lig, the highest tier football league of Turkey.

Beşiktaş and Galatasaray finished the season with 84 points and had equal double average. Beşiktaş managed to overtake Galatasaray by 1 goal difference in the overall average and won the league title for the first time since 2016–17 season, their 16th overall.

== Teams ==
A total of 21 teams contested the league, including eighteen sides from the 2019–20 season and three promoted from the 2019–20 TFF First League, including Hatayspor and BB Erzurumspor, as well as the winners of the 2019–20 TFF First League playoffs, Fatih Karagümrük. Hatayspor made its debut in the Süper Lig. BB Erzurumspor made an immediate return after one season away. Fatih Karagümrük returned following a 36 year hiatus after achieving two successive promotions. They were also relegated to amateur level twice during this period. The bottom four teams were relegated to the 2021–22 TFF First League.

=== Stadiums and locations ===
Location of teams in 2020–21 Süper Lig
Istanbul Province clubs

Team	Home city	Stadium	Capacity
Alanyaspor	Alanya	Bahçeşehir Okulları Stadium	10,130
Ankaragücü	Ankara (Yenimahalle)	Eryaman Stadium	20,560
Antalyaspor	Antalya	Antalya Stadium	32,537
Beşiktaş	Istanbul (Beşiktaş)	Vodafone Park	42,590
BB Erzurumspor	Erzurum	Kazım Karabekir Stadium	21,374
Çaykur Rizespor	Rize	Yeni Rize Şehir Stadı	15,332
Denizlispor	Denizli	Denizli Atatürk Stadium	18,745
Fatih Karagümrük	Istanbul (Fatih)	Atatürk Olympic Stadium	76,761
Fenerbahçe	Istanbul (Kadıköy)	Şükrü Saracoğlu Stadium	47,834
Galatasaray	Istanbul (Sarıyer)	Türk Telekom Stadium	52,650
Gaziantep	Gaziantep	Kalyon Stadium	33,502
Gençlerbirliği	Ankara (Yenimahalle)	Eryaman Stadium	20,560
Göztepe	İzmir	Gürsel Aksel Stadium	25,035
Hatayspor	Antakya	Yeni Hatay Stadyumu	25,000
İstanbul Başakşehir	Istanbul (Başakşehir)	Başakşehir Fatih Terim Stadium	17,156
Kasımpaşa	Istanbul (Beyoğlu)	Recep Tayyip Erdoğan Stadium	14,234
Kayserispor	Kayseri	Kadir Has Stadium	32,864
Konyaspor	Konya	Medaş Konya Metropolitan Stadium	42,000
Sivasspor	Sivas	4 Eylül Stadium	27,532
Trabzonspor	Trabzon	Şenol Güneş Sports Complex	40,782
Yeni Malatyaspor	Malatya	Malatya Stadium	27,044

=== Personnel and sponsorship ===
Team	Head coach	Captain	Kit manufacturer	Sponsor
Alanyaspor	(Turkey) Çağdaş Atan	(Turkey) Efecan Karaca	Uhlsport	TAV Airports
Ankaragücü	(Turkey) Hikmet Karaman	(Turkey) Korcan Çelikay	Nike	Onvo
Antalyaspor	(Turkey) Ersun Yanal	(Turkey) Hakan Özmert	Kappa	Regnum
Beşiktaş	(Turkey) Sergen Yalçın	(Canada) Atiba Hutchinson	Adidas	Beko
BB Erzurumspor	Vacant	(Turkey) Cenk Ahmet Alkılıç	Puma	Mahmood Coffee
Çaykur Rizespor	(Turkey) Bülent Uygun	(Turkey) Abdullah Durak	Nike	Çaykur
Denizlispor	(Turkey) Ali Tandoğan	(Colombia) Hugo Rodallega	Kappa	Yukatel
Fatih Karagümrük	(Italy) Francesco Farioli	(Argentina) Lucas Biglia	Wulfz	Wulfz
Fenerbahçe	(Turkey) Emre Belözoğlu	(Turkey) Gökhan Gönül	Adidas	Avis
Galatasaray	(Turkey) Fatih Terim	(Uruguay) Fernando Muslera	Nike	Sixt
Gaziantep	(Portugal) Sá Pinto	(Turkey) Günay Güvenç	Nike	Maisonette
Gençlerbirliği	(Turkey) Özcan Bizati	(Senegal) Zargo Touré	Macron	Skyline Tower
Göztepe	(Turkey) Ünal Karaman	(Turkey) Halil Akbunar	Puma	Türkerler
Hatayspor	(Turkey) Ömer Erdoğan	(Turkey) Mesut Çaytemel	Nike	Concorde Hotels & Resorts
İstanbul Başakşehir	(Turkey) Aykut Kocaman	(Turkey) Mahmut Tekdemir	Bilcee	Decovita
Kasımpaşa	(Bulgaria) Şenol Can	(Turkey) Ramazan Köse	Nike	Ciner
Kayserispor	(Turkey) Yalçın Koşukavak	(Romania) Cristian Săpunaru	Nike	İstikbal
Konyaspor	(Turkey) İlhan Palut	(Bosnia and Herzegovina) Ibrahim Šehić	Lotto	Spor Toto
Sivasspor	(Turkey) Rıza Çalımbay	(Turkey) Ziya Erdal	Puma	Demir İnşaat
Trabzonspor	(Turkey) Abdullah Avcı	(Turkey) Uğurcan Çakır	Macron	Vestel
Yeni Malatyaspor	(Turkey) İrfan Buz	(Turkey) Adem Büyük	Nike	Medicana

=== Managerial changes ===
Team	Outgoing manager	Manner of departure	Date of vacancy	Position in table	Replaced by	Date of appointment
Çaykur Rizespor	(Turkey) Ünal Karaman	Resignation	14 July 2020	Pre-season	(Croatia) Stjepan Tomas	27 July 2020
Hatayspor	(Turkey) Mehmet Altıparmak	Mutual agreement	23 July 2020	Pre-season	(Turkey) Ömer Erdoğan	11 August 2020
Fenerbahçe	(Turkey) Tahir Karapınar	End of interim period	27 July 2020	Pre-season	(Turkey) Erol Bulut	5 August 2020
Denizlispor	(Turkey) Levent Kartop	End of interim period	27 July 2020	Pre-season	(Croatia) Robert Prosinečki	10 August 2020
Kasımpaşa	(Turkey) Fuat Çapa	End of contract	27 July 2020	Pre-season	(Turkey) Mehmet Altıparmak	11 August 2020
Ankaragücü	(Turkey) İbrahim Üzülmez	End of contract	27 July 2020	Pre-season	(Turkey) Fuat Çapa	8 August 2020
Gençlerbirliği	(Turkey) Hamza Hamzaoğlu	Mutual agreement	29 July 2020	Pre-season	(Turkey) Mert Nobre	3 August 2020
Fatih Karagümrük	(Turkey) Atılay Canel	End of interim period	31 July 2020	Pre-season	(Bulgaria) Şenol Can	1 August 2020
Alanyaspor	(Turkey) Erol Bulut	End of contract	3 August 2020	Pre-season	(Turkey) Çağdaş Atan	6 August 2020
Kayserispor	(Croatia) Robert Prosinečki	End of contract	6 August 2020	Pre-season	(Turkey) Bayram Bektaş	10 August 2020
Yeni Malatyaspor	(Turkey) Hikmet Karaman	Mutual agreement	19 August 2020	Pre-season	(Turkey) Hamza Hamzaoğlu	19 August 2020
Konyaspor	(Turkey) Bülent Korkmaz	Resignation	12 September 2020	Pre-season	(Turkey) İsmail Kartal	13 September 2020
Antalyaspor	(Turkey) Tamer Tuna	Mutual agreement	29 October 2020	7th	(Turkey) Ersun Yanal	11 November 2020
Trabzonspor	(England) Eddie Newton	Mutual agreement	31 October 2020	19th	(Turkey) Abdullah Avcı	10 November 2020
Kayserispor	(Turkey) Bayram Bektaş	Mutual agreement	1 November 2020	17th	(Turkey) Samet Aybaba	11 November 2020
Kasımpaşa	(Turkey) Mehmet Altıparmak	Mutual agreement	2 November 2020	6th	(Turkey) İrfan Buz	13 November 2020
Gençlerbirliği	(Turkey) Mert Nobre	Mutual agreement	10 November 2020	19th	(Turkey) Mustafa Kaplan	14 November 2020
Ankaragücü	(Turkey) Fuat Çapa	Mutual agreement	22 November 2020	21st	(Turkey) Mustafa Dalcı	23 January 2021
Denizlispor	(Croatia) Robert Prosinečki	Mutual agreement	25 November 2020	20th	(Turkey) Yalçın Koşukavak	15 December 2020
Kasımpaşa	(Turkey) İrfan Buz	Resignation	27 November 2020	10th	(Turkey) Fuat Çapa	28 November 2020
BB Erzurumspor	(Turkey) Mehmet Özdilek	Mutual agreement	30 November 2020	17th	(Turkey) Hüseyin Çimşir	2 December 2020
BB Erzurumspor	(Turkey) Hüseyin Çimşir	Mutual agreement	21 December 2020	21st	(Turkey) Mesut Bakkal	25 December 2020
Kayserispor	(Turkey) Samet Aybaba	Mutual agreement	4 January 2021	21st	(Romania) Dan Petrescu	10 January 2021
Göztepe	(Turkey) İlhan Palut	Resignation	10 January 2021	14th	(Turkey) Ünal Karaman	20 January 2021
Gaziantep	(Romania) Marius Șumudică	Mutual agreement	10 January 2021	4th	(Portugal) Sá Pinto	20 January 2021
Çaykur Rizespor	(Croatia) Stjepan Tomas	Mutual agreement	19 January 2021	16th	(Romania) Marius Șumudică	25 January 2021
Denizlispor	(Turkey) Yalçın Koşukavak	Resignation	28 January 2021	21st	(Turkey) Hakan Kutlu	29 January 2021
İstanbul Başakşehir	(Turkey) Okan Buruk	Mutual agreement	29 January 2021	15th	(Turkey) Aykut Kocaman	1 February 2021
Gençlerbirliği	(Turkey) Mustafa Kaplan	Resignation	31 January 2021	19th	(Turkey) Mehmet Altıparmak	31 January 2021
Konyaspor	(Turkey) İsmail Kartal	Mutual agreement	8 February 2021	15th	(Turkey) İlhan Palut	9 February 2021
Ankaragücü	(Turkey) Mustafa Dalcı	Mutual agreement	9 February 2021	20th	(Turkey) Hikmet Karaman	10 February 2021
Yeni Malatyaspor	(Turkey) Hamza Hamzaoğlu	Mutual agreement	21 February 2021	11th	(Turkey) İrfan Buz	11 March 2021
Kayserispor	(Romania) Dan Petrescu	Mutual agreement	23 February 2021	16th	(Turkey) Hamza Hamzaoğlu	20 March 2021
Çaykur Rizespor	(Romania) Marius Șumudică	Mutual agreement	3 March 2021	16th	(Turkey) Bülent Uygun	7 March 2021
Gençlerbirliği	(Turkey) Mehmet Altıparmak	Mutual agreement	9 March 2021	21st	(Turkey) Özcan Bizati	11 March 2021
Fatih Karagümrük	(Bulgaria) Şenol Can	Mutual agreement	15 March 2021	8th	(Italy) Francesco Farioli	21 March 2021
BB Erzurumspor	(Turkey) Mesut Bakkal	Mutual agreement	21 March 2021	19th	(Turkey) İsmail Kartal	23 March 2021
Kasımpaşa	(Turkey) Fuat Çapa	Mutual agreement	22 March 2021	15th	(Bulgaria) Şenol Can	24 March 2021
Fenerbahçe	(Turkey) Erol Bulut	Mutual agreement	25 March 2021	3rd	(Turkey) Emre Belözoğlu	25 March 2021
BB Erzurumspor	(Turkey) İsmail Kartal	Resignation	28 March 2021	19th	(Turkey) Yılmaz Vural	29 March 2021
Denizlispor	(Turkey) Hakan Kutlu	Resignation	18 April 2021	21st	(Turkey) Ali Tandoğan	19 April 2021
Kayserispor	(Turkey) Hamza Hamzaoğlu	Mutual agreement	25 April 2021	19th	(Turkey) Yalçın Koşukavak	26 April 2021
BB Erzurumspor	(Turkey) Yılmaz Vural	Mutual agreement	9 May 2021	19th	(Turkey) Şenol Fidan	9 May 2021

=== Foreign players ===
Club	Player 1	Player 2	Player 3	Player 4	Player 5	Player 6	Player 7	Player 8	Player 9	Player 10	Player 11	Player 12	Player 13	Player 14	Former Players
Alanyaspor	(Brazil) Davidson	(Greece) Manolis Siopis	(Greece) Georgios Tzavellas	(Mauritania) El Mami Tetah	(Paraguay) Adam Bareiro	(Poland) Damian Kądzior	(Portugal) José Marafona	(Senegal) Khouma Babacar	(Sierra Leone) Steven Caulker	(Spain) Juanfran	(Switzerland) François Moubandje				(Brazil) Baiano (Greece) Anastasios Bakasetas
Ankaragücü	(Angola) Geraldo	(Brazil) Ricardo	(Croatia) Ante Kulušić	(Croatia) Zvonimir Šarlija	(Georgia (country)) Saba Lobzhanidze	(Ghana) Joseph Paintsil	(Greece) Stelios Kitsiou	(Kosovo) Idriz Voca	(Norway) Torgeir Børven	(Poland) Daniel Łukasik	(Poland) Michał Pazdan	(Portugal) Tiago Pinto	(Senegal) Aliou Badji	(Senegal) Assane Dioussé	(Democratic Republic of the Congo) Jonathan Bolingi (Serbia) Luka Adžić
Antalyaspor	(Albania) Omar Imeri	(Angola) Fredy	(Belgium) Ruud Boffin	(Brazil) Amilton	(Brazil) Naldo	(Germany) Lukas Podolski	(Germany) Sidney Sam	(Ivory Coast) Jean Armel Drolé	(Jamaica) Dever Orgill	(Russia) Fyodor Kudryashov					(Nigeria) Paul Mukairu (North Macedonia) Adis Jahović
Beşiktaş	(Algeria) Rachid Ghezzal	(Bosnia and Herzegovina) Ajdin Hasić	(Brazil) Souza	(Brazil) Welinton	(Cameroon) Vincent Aboubakar	(Canada) Atiba Hutchinson	(Canada) Cyle Larin	(Croatia) Domagoj Vida	(Democratic Republic of the Congo) Fabrice Nsakala	(France) Georges-Kévin Nkoudou	(France) Valentin Rosier	(Ghana) Bernard Mensah	(Serbia) Adem Ljajić	(Spain) Javi Montero	(Netherlands) Jeremain Lens (United States) Tyler Boyd
BB Erzurumspor	(Cameroon) Adolphe Teikeu	(Cameroon) Petrus Boumal	(Cape Verde) Ricardo Gomes	(France) Gabriel Obertan	(France) Léo Schwechlen	(Kenya) Johanna Omolo	(Kosovo) Elbasan Rashani	(Lithuania) Arvydas Novikovas	(Morocco) Aatif Chahechouhe	(Morocco) Manuel da Costa	(Morocco) Moestafa El Kabir	(Morocco) Zakarya Bergdich	(Poland) Jakub Szumski	(Ukraine) Bohdan Butko	(Albania) Armando Sadiku (Algeria) Jugurtha Hamroun (Benin) Fabien Farnolle (Ecuador) Arturo Mina (France) Rashad Muhammed (Ghana) Yaw Ackah (Ivory Coast) Ibrahim Sissoko (Mali) Mahamadou Ba (Netherlands) Brahim Darri (Suriname) Mitchell Donald
Çaykur Rizespor	(Brazil) Baiano	(Brazil) Fernando Andrade	(Brazil) Fernando Boldrin	(Croatia) Damjan Đoković	(Croatia) Dario Melnjak	(Czech Republic) Milan Škoda	(France) Loïc Rémy	(Norway) Alexander Søderlund	(Paraguay) Braian Samudio	(Poland) Konrad Michalak	(Slovakia) Erik Sabo	(Tunisia) Montassar Talbi	(Tunisia) Yassine Meriah	(Ukraine) Mykola Morozyuk	(Ghana) Godfred Donsah (Greece) Dimitrios Chatziisaias (Ivory Coast) Ismaël Diomandé (Serbia) Dušan Jovančić (Slovenia) Amedej Vetrih
Denizlispor	(Bosnia and Herzegovina) Muris Mešanović	(Brazil) Fabiano Leismann	(Chile) Ángelo Sagal	(Colombia) Hugo Rodallega	(Germany) Marvin Bakalorz	(Kosovo) Veton Tusha	(Iraq) Ahmed Yasin	(Mali) Hadi Sacko	(Poland) Radosław Murawski	(Togo) Matthieu Dossevi	(Tunisia) Ayman Ben Mohamed	(United States) Mix Diskerud			(Argentina) Federico Varela (Morocco) Ismaïl Aissati (Morocco) Zakarya Bergdich (Portugal) Tiago Lopes (Romania) Costel Pantilimon (Serbia) Neven Subotić
Fatih Karagümrük	(Argentina) Lucas Biglia	(Argentina) Lucas Castro	(Argentina) Gastón Campi	(Chile) Enzo Roco	(France) Yannis Salibur	(Italy) Andrea Bertolacci	(Italy) Emiliano Viviano	(Italy) Fabio Borini	(Netherlands) Jeremain Lens	(Norway) Vegar Hedenstad	(Poland) Artur Sobiech	(Senegal) Alassane Ndao	(Slovenia) Jure Balkovec	(Switzerland) Kemal Ademi	(Bosnia and Herzegovina) Ervin Zukanović (Georgia (country)) Vato Arveladze (Morocco) Aatif Chahechouhe (Netherlands) Brahim Darri (Senegal) Badou Ndiaye (Slovakia) Erik Sabo (United States) Eric Lichaj
Fenerbahçe	(Argentina) Diego Perotti	(Argentina) José Sosa	(Brazil) Luiz Gustavo	(Czech Republic) Filip Novák	(Democratic Republic of the Congo) Marcel Tisserand	(Ecuador) Enner Valencia	(Greece) Dimitrios Pelkas	(Hungary) Attila Szalai	(Nigeria) Bright Osayi-Samuel	(Senegal) Mame Thiam	(Senegal) Papiss Cissé	(Tanzania) Mbwana Samatta	(Uruguay) Mauricio Lemos		(Denmark) Zanka (Switzerland) Kemal Ademi (Switzerland) Michael Frey
Galatasaray	(Algeria) Sofiane Feghouli	(Brazil) Marcão	(Colombia) Radamel Falcao	(Democratic Republic of the Congo) Christian Luyindama	(Egypt) Mostafa Mohamed	(Netherlands) Ryan Babel	(Nigeria) Henry Onyekuru	(Nigeria) Peter Etebo	(Norway) Martin Linnes	(Portugal) Gedson Fernandes	(Suriname) Ryan Donk	(United States) DeAndre Yedlin	(Uruguay) Fernando Muslera	(Uruguay) Marcelo Saracchi	(Morocco) Younès Belhanda (Nigeria) Jesse Sekidika (Nigeria) Valentine Ozornwafor (Norway) Omar Elabdellaoui (Senegal) Mbayye Diagne

== League table ==
Pos	Team	Pld	W	D	L	GF	GA	GD	Pts	Qualification or relegation
1	Beşiktaş (C)	40	26	6	8	89	44	+45	84	Qualification for the Champions League group stage
2	Galatasaray	40	26	6	8	80	36	+44	84	Qualification for the Champions League second qualifying round
3	Fenerbahçe	40	25	7	8	72	41	+31	82	Qualification for the Europa League play-off round
4	Trabzonspor	40	19	14	7	50	37	+13	71	Qualification for the Europa Conference League third qualifying round
5	Sivasspor	40	16	17	7	54	43	+11	65	Qualification for the Europa Conference League second qualifying round
6	Hatayspor	40	17	10	13	62	53	+9	61	
7	Alanyaspor	40	17	9	14	58	45	+13	60	
8	Fatih Karagümrük	40	16	12	12	64	52	+12	60	
9	Gaziantep	40	15	13	12	59	51	+8	58	
10	Göztepe	40	13	12	15	59	59	0	51	
11	Konyaspor	40	12	14	14	49	48	+1	50	
12	Başakşehir	40	12	12	16	43	55	−12	48	
13	Çaykur Rizespor	40	12	12	16	53	69	−16	48	
14	Kasımpaşa	40	12	10	18	47	57	−10	46	
15	Yeni Malatyaspor	40	10	15	15	49	53	−4	45	
16	Antalyaspor	40	9	17	14	41	55	−14	44	
17	Kayserispor	40	9	14	17	35	52	−17	41	
18	BB Erzurumspor (R)	40	10	10	20	44	68	−24	40	Relegation to TFF First League
19	Ankaragücü (R)	40	10	8	22	46	65	−19	38	Relegation to TFF First League
20	Gençlerbirliği (R)	40	10	8	22	44	76	−32	38	Relegation to TFF First League
21	Denizlispor (R)	40	6	10	24	38	77	−39	28	Relegation to TFF First League

Source: Süper Lig, Soccerway
Rules for classification: 1) Points; 2) Head-to-head points; 3) Head-to-head goal difference; 4) Head-to-head goals scored; 5) Goal difference; 6) Goals scored; 7) Play-off.
(C) Champions; (R) Relegated

== Results ==
Home \ Away	ALA	ANK	ANT	BEŞ	RİZ	DEN	ERZ	FKA	FEN	GAL	GFK	GEN	GÖZ	HAT	İBA	KAS	KAY	KON	SİV	TRA	YMA
Alanyaspor	—	4–3	4–0	2–1	2–1	3–2	2–3	2–0	0–0	0–1	3–2	1–2	1–1	6–0	3–0	1–2	2–0	1–0	3–1	1–1	1–1
Ankaragücü	0–1	—	1–0	0–1	1–1	1–1	1–2	2–2	1–2	2–1	0–1	2–1	3–0	2–0	1–2	1–0	0–1	4–3	1–4	0–1	3–1
Antalyaspor	0–2	1–0	—	1–1	2–3	1–0	3–1	3–1	1–2	0–1	1–1	2–0	2–3	0–6	0–0	1–1	2–0	0–0	2–4	1–1	1–1
Beşiktaş	3–0	2–2	1–1	—	6–0	3–0	4–0	1–2	1–1	2–0	2–1	0–1	2–1	7–0	3–2	3–0	3–1	1–0	3–0	1–2	1–0
Rizespor	1–1	5–3	2–1	2–3	—	1–1	0–2	0–0	1–2	0–4	3–0	1–1	3–2	1–0	0–2	1–1	1–0	5–3	0–0	0–0	0–4
Denizlispor	1–0	1–2	1–1	2–3	0–1	—	2–3	1–2	0–2	1–4	0–1	1–0	2–1	0–2	0–0	1–1	0–1	0–0	1–1	0–0	3–2
BB Erzurumspor	1–1	1–0	2–2	2–4	0–0	1–2	—	2–2	0–3	1–2	1–1	0–1	1–1	1–3	1–2	0–1	1–1	1–2	1–2	0–0	1–0
Fatih Karagümrük	2–0	0–1	2–2	1–4	2–1	5–1	5–1	—	1–2	2–1	2–0	5–1	1–1	1–0	2–0	1–1	3–0	2–1	1–1	1–2	3–0
Fenerbahçe	2–1	3–1	1–1	3–4	1–0	1–0	3–1	2–1	—	0–1	3–1	1–2	0–1	0–0	4–1	3–2	3–0	0–2	1–2	3–1	0–3
Galatasaray	1–2	1–0	0–0	3–1	3–4	6–1	2–0	1–1	0–0	—	3–1	6–0	3–1	3–0	3–0	2–1	1–1	1–0	2–2	1–1	3–1
Gaziantep	3–1	2–0	0–0	3–1	4–5	2–0	2–3	2–2	3–1	1–2	—	2–1	2–0	1–1	2–0	2–2	2–1	1–0	0–1	1–1	2–2
Gençlerbirliği	2–1	1–1	0–1	0–3	2–1	1–2	1–1	1–3	1–5	0–2	1–1	—	5–3	3–1	0–1	2–1	3–2	0–0	2–3	1–2	1–1
Göztepe	1–0	3–1	0–1	1–2	2–0	5–1	3–1	1–1	2–3	1–3	2–2	4–0	—	0–1	2–1	1–0	1–1	0–1	3–5	1–1	2–2
Hatayspor	0–0	4–1	3–2	2–2	2–2	1–0	3–0	3–1	1–2	3–0	0–1	3–1	2–3	—	2–0	1–0	1–3	2–1	1–1	0–1	1–2
İstanbul Başakşehir	0–0	2–1	5–1	2–3	1–1	3–3	1–0	0–1	1–2	0–2	1–2	2–1	0–0	1–5	—	2–2	0–0	1–1	1–1	0–1	3–1
Kasımpaşa	3–0	3–1	2–2	1–0	2–0	3–2	1–2	3–2	0–3	1–0	0–4	2–0	0–0	1–4	0–1	—	0–1	1–1	2–0	1–2	0–0
Kayserispor	1–1	0–0	0–1	0–2	2–1	6–3	1–3	0–0	1–2	0–3	0–0	2–2	1–1	0–1	2–0	1–0	—	1–2	1–3	0–0	1–0
Konyaspor	1–0	1–1	0–0	4–1	1–1	2–0	2–0	5–1	0–3	4–3	0–0	0–0	2–3	0–0	1–2	2–1	0–0	—	0–1	1–1	1–1
Sivasspor	0–2	0–0	0–0	0–0	0–2	2–2	0–0	1–0	1–1	1–2	2–1	3–1	0–1	1–1	0–0	2–1	2–0	3–1	—	0–0	1–0
Trabzonspor	1–3	4–1	2–1	1–3	2–1	1–0	1–0	2–0	0–1	0–2	1–0	2–1	1–0	1–1	0–2	3–4	1–1	3–1	1–1	—	3–1
Yeni Malatyaspor	1–0	2–1	1–0	0–1	4–1	2–0	1–3	0–0	1–1	0–1	2–2	2–1	1–1	1–1	1–1	2–0	1–1	2–3	2–2	0–2	—

Source: Turkish Football Federation (in Turkish)
Legend: Blue = home team win; Yellow = draw; Red = away team win.
For upcoming matches, an "a" indicates there is an article about the rivalry between the two participants.

== Number of teams by region ==
Number	Region	Team(s)
6	Marmara	Beşiktaş, Fatih Karagümrük, Fenerbahçe, Galatasaray, İstanbul Başakşehir and Kasımpaşa
5	Central Anatolia	Kayserispor, Gençlerbirliği, Konyaspor, Sivasspor and Ankaragücü
3	Mediterranean	Alanyaspor, Antalyaspor and Hatayspor
2	Black Sea	Çaykur Rizespor and Trabzonspor
2	Aegean	Denizlispor and Göztepe
2	Eastern Anatolia	BB Erzurumspor and Yeni Malatyaspor
1	Southeastern Anatolia	Gaziantep

== Statistics ==
=== Top goalscorers ===
Rank	Player	Club(s)	Goals
1	(Gabon) Aaron Boupendza	Hatayspor	22
2	(Senegal) Mame Diouf	Hatayspor	19
2	(Canada) Cyle Larin	Beşiktaş	19
4	(Turkey) Adem Büyük	Yeni Malatyaspor	17
5	(Cameroon) Vincent Aboubakar	Beşiktaş	15
5	(Turkey) Muhammet Demir	Gaziantep	15
5	(Romania) Alexandru Maxim	Gaziantep	15
8	(Colombia) Hugo Rodallega	Denizlispor	14
9	(Greece) Tasos Bakasetas	Alanyaspor/Trabzonspor	13
10	(Ecuador) Enner Valencia	Fenerbahçe	12

=== Clean sheets ===
Rank	Player	Club(s)	Clean sheets
1	(Turkey) Uğurcan Çakır	Trabzonspor	13
1	(Turkey) Ersin Destanoğlu	Beşiktaş	13
3	(Belgium) Ruud Boffin	Antalyaspor	12
4	(Turkey) Günay Güvenç	Gaziantep	11
4	(Portugal) José Marafona	Alanyaspor	11
4	(Morocco) Munir	Hatayspor	11
7	(Turkey) Altay Bayındır	Fenerbahçe	10
8	(Turkey) Doğan Alemdar	Kayserispor	9
8	(Uruguay) Fernando Muslera	Galatasaray	9
10	(Turkey) İrfan Can Eğribayat	Göztepe	8
10	(Bosnia and Herzegovina) Ibrahim Šehić	Konyaspor	8

=== Hat-tricks ===
Date	Player	For	Against	Result
4 October 2020	(Brazil) Davidson	Alanyaspor	Hatayspor	6–0 (H)
17 October 2020	(France) Loïc Rémy	Rizespor	Ankaragücü	5–3 (H)
28 November 2020	(Senegal) Mbaye Diagne	Galatasaray	Rizespor	4–0 (A)
29 December 2020	(Gabon) Aaron Boupendza^{4}	Hatayspor	Antalyaspor	6–0 (A)
6 January 2021	(Canada) Cyle Larin^{4}	Beşiktaş	Çaykur Rizespor	6–0 (H)
9 January 2021	(Morocco) Younès Belhanda	Galatasaray	Gençlerbirliği	6–0 (H)
10 April 2021	(North Macedonia) Adis Jahović	Göztepe	Hatayspor	3–2 (A)
17 April 2021	(Turkey) Kerem Aktürkoğlu	Galatasaray	Göztepe	3–1 (A)
1 May 2021	(Canada) Cyle Larin^{4}	Beşiktaş	Hatayspor	7–0 (H)
11 May 2021	(Romania) Bogdan Stancu	Gençlerbirliği	Göztepe	5–3 (H)

^{4} Player scored four goals

== Awards ==
=== Annual awards ===
Award	Winner	Club
Foreign Player of the Season	(Algeria) Rachid Ghezzal	Beşiktaş
Turkish Player of the Season	(Turkey) Taylan Antalyalı	Galatasaray
Goalkeeper of the Season	(Turkey) Altay Bayındır	Fenerbahçe
Defender of the Season	(Brazil) Vitor Hugo	Trabzonspor
Midfielder of the Season	(Brazil) Josef de Souza	Beşiktaş
Winger of the Season	(Ivory Coast) Max Gradel	Sivasspor
Forward of the Season	(Canada) Cyle Larin	Beşiktaş
Manager of the Season	(Turkey) Sergen Yalçın	Beşiktaş

Team of the Season
Goalkeeper	(Turkey) Uğurcan Çakır (Trabzonspor)			
Defence	(France) Valentin Rosier (Beşiktaş)	(Croatia) Domagoj Vida (Beşiktaş)	(Brazil) Marcão (Galatasaray)	(Turkey) Caner Erkin (Fenerbahçe)
Midfield	(Algeria) Rachid Ghezzal (Beşiktaş)	(Canada) Atiba Hutchinson (Beşiktaş)	(Turkey) Taylan Antalyalı (Galatasaray)	(Ivory Coast) Max Gradel (Sivasspor)
Attack	(Gabon) Aaron Boupendza (Hatayspor)		(Canada) Cyle Larin (Beşiktaş)	
