= 2021–22 TFF 1. Lig =

21st season of TFF 1. Lig

TFF 1. Lig
- Season: 2021–22
- Champions: MKE Ankaragücü
- Promoted: MKE Ankaragücü; Ümraniyespor; İstanbulspor
- Relegated: Kocaelispor; Bursaspor; Menemenspor; Balıkesirspor
- Matches: 342
- Goals: 901 (2.63 per match)
- Top goalscorer: Ahmet Sagat (17 goals)
- Biggest home win: Gençlerbirliği 5–0 Menemenspor (19 December 2021)
- Biggest away win: Altınordu 0–5 İstanbulspor (22 January 2022)
- Highest scoring: Adanaspor 6–2 Menemenspor (11 September 2021); BB Erzurumspor 6–2 Altınordu (17 October 2021)
- Longest winning run: MKE Ankaragücü (6 matches)
- Longest unbeaten run: Ümraniyespor (11 matches)
- Longest winless run: Balıkesirspor (15 matches)
- Longest losing run: Balıkesirspor (8 matches)
- All statistics correct as of 21 May 2022.

The 2021–22 TFF 1. Lig was the 21st season since the league was established in 2001 and 59th season of the second-level football league of Turkey since its establishment in 1963–64.

== Teams ==
- Adana Demirspor, Giresunspor and Altay promoted to 2021–22 Süper Lig.
- BB Erzurumspor, Ankaragücü, Gençlerbirliği and Denizlispor relegated from 2020–21 Süper Lig.
- Eyüpspor, Manisa and Kocaelispor promoted from 2020–21 TFF 2. Lig.
- The bottom four teams will be relegated to the 2022–23 TFF 2. Lig.

=== Stadiums and locations ===
Location of teams in 2021–22 TFF 1. Lig

| Team | Home city | Stadium | Capacity |
|---|---|---|---|
| Adanaspor | Adana (Çukurova) | New Adana Stadium | 33,543 |
| Altınordu | İzmir (Alsancak) | Alsancak Mustafa Denizli Stadium | 14,000 |
| Ankara Keçiörengücü | Ankara (Keçiören) | Ankara Aktepe Stadium | 4,883 |
| Balıkesirspor | Balıkesir (Altıeylül) | Balıkesir Atatürk Stadium | 13,732 |
| Bandırmaspor | Bandırma | 17 Eylül Stadium | 12,725 |
| BB Erzurumspor | Erzurum | Kazım Karabekir Stadium | 21,374 |
| Boluspor | Bolu | Bolu Atatürk Stadium | 8,456 |
| Bursaspor | Bursa | Bursa Büyükşehir Belediye Stadium | 43,361 |
| Denizlispor | Denizli | Denizli Atatürk Stadium | 18,745 |
| Eyüpspor | Istanbul (Eyüp) | Eyüp Stadium | 1,980 |
| Gençlerbirliği | Ankara (Yenimahalle) | Eryaman Stadium | 20,560 |
| İstanbulspor | Istanbul (Büyükçekmece) | Necmi Kadıoğlu Stadium | 4,488 |
| Kocaelispor | Kocaeli | Kocaeli Stadium | 33,000 |
| Manisa | Manisa | Manisa 19 Mayıs Stadium | 16,066 |
| Menemenspor | İzmir (Menemen) | Menemen İlçe Stadium | 4,420 |
| MKE Ankaragücü | Ankara (Yenimahalle) | Eryaman Stadium | 20,560 |
| Samsunspor | Samsun | Samsun Stadium | 33,919 |
| Tuzlaspor | Istanbul (Tuzla) | Tuzla Belediye Stadium | 1,600 |
| Ümraniyespor | Istanbul (Ümraniye) | Ümraniye Belediyesi Şehir Stadium | 3,513 |

=== Personnel and sponsorship ===
| Team | Head coach | Captain | Kit manufacturer | Sponsor |
|---|---|---|---|---|
| Adanaspor | (Turkey) Sait Karafırtınalar | (Turkey) Serdar Özkan | Joma | |
| Altınordu | (Turkey) Hüseyin Eroğlu | (Turkey) Ahmet İlhan Özek | Capelli Sport | Petrol Ofisi |
| Ankara Keçiörengücü | (Turkey) Taner Taşkın | (Turkey) Burak Aydın | Nike | |
| Balıkesirspor | (Turkey) İsmet Kamak | (Turkey) Atilla Özmen | Umbro | Bitexen |
| Royal Hastanesi Bandırmaspor | (Turkey) Mustafa Gürsel | (Turkey) Erkan Taşkıran | Macron | Bey Çimento |
| BB Erzurumspor | (Turkey) Erkan Sözeri | (Turkey) Mustafa Yumlu | Uhlsport | Bitexen |
| Beypiliç Boluspor | (Turkey) Reha Erginer | (Turkey) Eray Ataseven | Diadora | Kointra |
| Bursaspor | (Turkey) Tamer Tuna | (Turkey) Emirhan Aydoğan | Nike | Set Profil |
| Denizlispor | (Turkey) Fatih Tekke | (Turkey) Gökhan Süzen | Diadora | Pimatech |
| Eyüpspor | (Turkey) Zafer Turan | (Turkey) Emrullah Şalk | Nike | Green Motion Car Rental |
| Gençlerbirliği | (Turkey) Metin Diyadin | (Turkey) Ramazan Köse | Joma | Interpen |
| Kocaelispor | (Turkey) Mustafa Reşit Akçay | (Turkey) Korcan Çelikay | Kappa | Kent Konut |
| İstanbulspor | (Turkey) Osman Zeki Korkmaz | (Turkey) Onur Ergün | Jako | Uğur Okulları |
| Manisa | (Turkey) Turgay Altay | (Turkey) Nizamettin Çalışkan | Puma | |
| Menemenspor | (Turkey) Cenk Laleci | (Turkey) Mazlum Demir | Tryon | Folkart |
| MKE Ankaragücü | (Turkey) Mustafa Dalcı | (Portugal) Tiago Pinto | Diadora | Velux Ankara |
| Yılport Samsunspor | (Turkey) Fuat Çapa | (Turkey) Caner Arıcı | Macron | Yılport |
| Tuzlaspor | (Turkey) Hakan Kutlu | (Turkey) Ferhat Öztorun | Arem Sports | Bitexen |
| Bereket Sigorta Ümraniyespor | (Turkey) Recep Uçar | (Turkey) Burak Öğür | Nike | Bereket Sigorta |

=== Foreign players ===
| Club | Player 1 | Player 2 | Player 3 | Player 4 | Player 5 | Player 6 | Player 7 | Player 8 | Player 9 | Player 10 | Former Players |
|---|---|---|---|---|---|---|---|---|---|---|---|
| Adanaspor | (Benin) Yohan Roche | (England) Jordon Ibe | (Ghana) Isaac Donkor | (Ghana) Samuel Tetteh | (Morocco) Youssef Aït Bennasser | (Netherlands) Thomas Bruns | (Nigeria) Papa Daniel | (Senegal) Amadou Ciss | | | (Bosnia and Herzegovina) Goran Karačić (Nigeria) Innocent Kingsley (Serbia) Ognjen Ožegović |
| Altınordu | | | | | | | | | | | |
| Ankara Keçiörengücü | (Azerbaijan) Vusal Isgandarli | (Ghana) Yaw Ackah | (Kosovo) Arb Manaj | (Niger) Issa Djibrilla | (Nigeria) Adamu Alhassan | (Nigeria) Anthony Uzodimma | (Nigeria) Emeka Eze | (Nigeria) Ibrahim Olawoyin | (Senegal) Moustapha Camara | | (Democratic Republic of the Congo) Jodinel Nzeza (Guinea) Sadio Diallo |
| Balıkesirspor | (Central African Republic) Foxi Kéthévoama | (Croatia) Andrija Vuković | (Ghana) Mahatma Otoo | (Ivory Coast) Cédric Koré | (Kosovo) Oltion Bilalli | (Nigeria) Abraham Nwankwo | (Nigeria) Peter Ambrose | (Slovenia) Roman Bezjak | (Ukraine) Jemal Kizilatesh | | |
| Bandırmaspor | (Brazil) Allyson | (Democratic Republic of the Congo) Rémi Mulumba | (Guinea) Guy-Michel Landel | (Montenegro) Milutin Osmajić | (Nigeria) Aondona Adeede | (Nigeria) Chukwuma Akabueze | (Senegal) Philippe Kény | (Slovenia) Matej Pučko | | | (Kosovo) Arb Manaj |
| BB Erzurumspor | (Angola) Estrela | (Czech Republic) Martin Hašek | (Kosovo) Herolind Shala | (Lithuania) Arvydas Novikovas | (Mali) Aly Mallé | (Netherlands) Mikhail Rosheuvel | (Nigeria) Aaron Olanare | (Poland) Jakub Szumski | | | |
| Boluspor | (Albania) Bekim Balaj | (Albania) Dejvi Bregu | (Albania) Gentian Selmani | (Albania) Odise Roshi | (Democratic Republic of the Congo) Kabongo Kasongo | (Ivory Coast) Abdoulaye Diarrassouba | (Slovenia) Jakob Novak | (Ukraine) Oleksandr Rybka | | | (Nigeria) Odah Marshall |
| Bursaspor | (Argentina) Nicolás Zalazar | (Azerbaijan) Namiq Ələsgərov | (Belgium) Massimo Bruno | (Croatia) Luka Capan | (Guinea-Bissau) João Pedro | (Netherlands) Elton Acolatse | (Republic of the Congo) Thievy Bifouma | | | | (Chile) Cristóbal Jorquera (Germany) Reagy Ofosu (Slovenia) Tim Matavž |
| Denizlispor | (France) Léo Schwechlen | (Gabon) Kévin Mayi | (Ivory Coast) Brice Dja Djédjé | (Morocco) Ismaïl Aissati | (Netherlands) Brahim Darri | (Poland) Adam Stachowiak | (Portugal) Tiago Lopes | | | | (Kosovo) Veton Tusha (Nigeria) Ogenyi Onazi |
| Eyüpspor | (Angola) Jonathan Buatu | (Bulgaria) Strahil Popov | (France) Teddy Mézague | (The Gambia) Pa Dibba | (Ghana) Musah Mohammed | (Luxembourg) Gerson Rodrigues | (Luxembourg) Olivier Thill | (Nigeria) Jesse Sekidika | (Romania) Bogdan Stancu | (Senegal) Stéphane Badji | (Bosnia and Herzegovina) Zvonimir Kožulj |
| Gençlerbirliği | (Brazil) Sandro Lima | (Democratic Republic of the Congo) Aaron Tshibola | (Democratic Republic of the Congo) Kazenga LuaLua | (Israel) Sintayehu Sallalich | (Nigeria) Blessing Eleke | (Ukraine) Dmytro Hrechyshkin | (Ukraine) Oleksandr Byelyayev | | | | |
| İstanbulspor | (Albania) Eduard Rroca | (Albania) Kristal Abazaj | (Bosnia and Herzegovina) Aldin Čajić | (Cameroon) Patrick Etoga | (Kosovo) Jetmir Topalli | (Nigeria) Michael Ologo | (North Macedonia) Valon Ethemi | | | | (Croatia) Marin Ljubić |
| Kocaelispor | (Cameroon) Georges Mandjeck | (France) Michaël Pereira | (Greece) Dimitris Kolovos | (Kenya) Johanna Omolo | (Nigeria) Rasheed Akanbi | (Portugal) Diogo Coelho | (Senegal) Babacar Guèye | (Senegal) Mouhamed Diop | | | (Ecuador) Bryan Cabezas (Guinea) Abdoulaye Cissé (Liberia) Terrence Tisdell (South Africa) Dino Ndlovu |
| Manisa | (Cameroon) Serge Tabekou | (France) Loïck Landre | (France) Marvin Gakpa | (Jamaica) Dever Orgill | (Mali) Demba Diallo | (Portugal) André Sousa | (Serbia) Ognjen Ožegović | (Slovenia) Nino Kouter | | | (France) Guévin Tormin |
| Menemenspor | (Guinea) Abdoulaye Cissé | (Guinea-Bissau) Toni Gomes | (Lebanon) Mahdi Sabbah | (Mali) Mahamadou Ba | (Nigeria) Harrison Jiakponna | (Nigeria) Lanre Kehinde | (Nigeria) Ubah Chibuike | (Somalia) Omar Mohamed | | | (Benin) Mickaël Poté (Italy) Enock Balotelli (Nigeria) Adamu Alhassan (Nigeria) Rasheed Akanbi (Senegal) Edouard N'Diaye |
| MKE Ankaragücü | (Angola) Geraldo | (Morocco) Aatif Chahechouhe | (Norway) Ghayas Zahid | (Portugal) Tiago Pinto | (United States) Gboly Ariyibi | | | | | | (Poland) Daniel Łukasik |
| Samsunspor | (Albania) Eraldo Çinari | (Democratic Republic of the Congo) Joel Ngandu Kayamba | (Guinea) Elhadj Bah | (Ivory Coast) Ismaël Diomandé | (Ivory Coast) Junior Tallo | (Ivory Coast) Kévin Boli | (Ivory Coast) Moryké Fofana | (Montenegro) Vukan Savićević | (Portugal) Tomané | (Trinidad and Tobago) Sheldon Bateau | (Serbia) Alen Melunović |
| Tuzlaspor | (Albania) Jurgen Bardhi | (Austria) Philipp Angeler | (Cameroon) Stéphane Mbia | (England) Kadeem Harris | (Moldova) Veaceslav Posmac | (Nigeria) Francis Ezeh | (Senegal) Lamine Diack | (Slovenia) Rajko Rotman | (Ukraine) Andriy Kulakov | | (Croatia) Zvonimir Mikulić (Norway) Marcus Pedersen (Portugal) Ricardo Valente |
| Ümraniyespor | (Bosnia and Herzegovina) Ajdin Hasić | (Bosnia and Herzegovina) Avdija Vršajević | (Croatia) Antonio Mršić | (Croatia) Tomislav Glumac | (Italy) Stefano Napoleoni | (Morocco) Yacine Bammou | (Senegal) Idrissa Camara | (Venezuela) Yonathan Del Valle | | | (Nigeria) Lanre Kehinde |

== League table ==
| Pos | Team | Pld | W | D | L | GF | GA | GD | Pts | Qualification or relegation |
|---|---|---|---|---|---|---|---|---|---|---|
| 1 | MKE Ankaragücü (C, P) | 36 | 21 | 7 | 8 | 56 | 31 | +25 | 70 (Note: MKE Ankaragücü is ahead of Ümraniyespor on head-to-head points: MKE Ankaragücü 4, Ümraniyespor 1.) | Promotion to the Süper Lig |
| 2 | Ümraniyespor (P) | 36 | 21 | 7 | 8 | 64 | 37 | +27 | 70 | Promotion to the Süper Lig |
| 3 | Bandırmaspor | 36 | 19 | 5 | 12 | 56 | 34 | +22 | 62 | Qualification for the Süper Lig Playoffs |
| 4 | İstanbulspor (O, P) | 36 | 17 | 9 | 10 | 57 | 40 | +17 | 60 | Qualification for the Süper Lig Playoffs |
| 5 | BB Erzurumspor | 36 | 16 | 10 | 10 | 55 | 44 | +11 | 58 | Qualification for the Süper Lig Playoffs |
| 6 | Eyüpspor | 36 | 15 | 12 | 9 | 56 | 44 | +12 | 57 | Qualification for the Süper Lig Playoffs |
| 7 | Samsunspor | 36 | 13 | 12 | 11 | 54 | 46 | +8 | 51 | |
| 8 | Boluspor | 36 | 14 | 8 | 14 | 42 | 44 | −2 | 50 | |
| 9 | Manisa | 36 | 14 | 7 | 15 | 45 | 44 | +1 | 49 (Note: Head-to-head points: Manisa 12, Tuzlaspor 6, Denizlispor 0.) | |
| 10 | Tuzlaspor | 36 | 13 | 10 | 13 | 45 | 44 | +1 | 49 | |
| 11 | Denizlispor | 36 | 14 | 7 | 15 | 46 | 50 | −4 | 49 | |
| 12 | Ankara Keçiörengücü | 36 | 13 | 9 | 14 | 45 | 47 | −2 | 48 | |
| 13 | Gençlerbirliği | 36 | 14 | 6 | 16 | 44 | 54 | −10 | 48 | |
| 14 | Altınordu | 36 | 14 | 3 | 19 | 45 | 62 | −17 | 45 (Note: Altınordu is ahead of Adanaspor on head-to-head goal difference: Altınordu +1, Adanaspor –1.) | |
| 15 | Adanaspor | 36 | 12 | 9 | 15 | 40 | 44 | −4 | 45 | |
| 16 | Kocaelispor (R) | 36 | 12 | 8 | 16 | 40 | 49 | −9 | 44 | Relegation to the TFF Second League |
| 17 | Bursaspor (R) | 36 | 12 | 8 | 16 | 43 | 53 | −10 | 44 | Relegation to the TFF Second League |
| 18 | Menemenspor (R) | 36 | 8 | 14 | 14 | 42 | 57 | −15 | 38 | Relegation to the TFF Second League |
| 19 | Balıkesirspor (R) | 36 | 3 | 3 | 30 | 26 | 77 | −51 | 12 | Relegation to the TFF Second League |

Source: TFF
Rules for classification: 1) Points; 2) Head-to-head points; 3) Head-to-head goal difference; 4) Head-to-head goals scored; 5) Goal difference; 6) Goals scored
(C) Champions; (O) Play-off winners; (P) Promoted; (R) Relegated

=== Positions by round ===
The table lists the positions of teams after each week of matches. In order to preserve chronological evolvements, any postponed matches are not included to the round at which they were originally scheduled, but added to the full round they were played immediately afterwards.

| Team ╲ Round | 1 | 2 | 3 | 4 | 5 | 6 | 7 | 8 | 9 | 10 | 11 | 12 | 13 | 14 | 15 | 16 | 17 | 18 | 19 | 20 | 21 | 22 | 23 | 24 | 25 | 26 | 27 | 28 | 29 | 30 | 31 | 32 | 33 | 34 | 35 | 36 | 37 | 38 |
|---|---|---|---|---|---|---|---|---|---|---|---|---|---|---|---|---|---|---|---|---|---|---|---|---|---|---|---|---|---|---|---|---|---|---|---|---|---|---|
| MKE Ankaragücü | 11 | 11 | 7 | 6 | 3 | 2 | 2 | 2 | 2 | 2 | 2 | 1 | 2 | 2 | 1 | 2 | 3 | 2 | 2 | 2 | 2 | 2 | 1 | 1 | 1 | 1 | 1 | 1 | 1 | 1 | 1 | 1 | 1 | 1 | 1 | 1 | 2 | 1 |
| Ümraniyespor | 1 | 1 | 1 | 1 | 1 | 1 | 1 | 1 | 1 | 1 | 1 | 2 | 1 | 1 | 3 | 1 | 1 | 1 | 1 | 1 | 1 | 1 | 2 | 2 | 2 | 2 | 2 | 2 | 2 | 2 | 2 | 2 | 2 | 2 | 2 | 2 | 1 | 2 |
| Bandırmaspor | 3 | 3 | 5 | 8 | 10 | 6 | 5 | 4 | 6 | 5 | 5 | 4 | 4 | 5 | 5 | 5 | 5 | 4 | 4 | 5 | 5 | 5 | 5 | 5 | 5 | 5 | 3 | 3 | 3 | 3 | 3 | 3 | 3 | 3 | 5 | 3 | 3 | 3 |
| İstanbulspor | 14 | 18 | 11 | 13 | 18 | 18 | 13 | 14 | 11 | 13 | 10 | 8 | 8 | 7 | 8 | 8 | 7 | 6 | 6 | 6 | 6 | 6 | 6 | 6 | 6 | 6 | 6 | 4 | 4 | 5 | 4 | 4 | 4 | 4 | 3 | 4 | 4 | 4 |
| BB Erzurumspor | 17 | 9 | 6 | 5 | 6 | 4 | 3 | 5 | 3 | 4 | 4 | 5 | 5 | 4 | 2 | 3 | 2 | 3 | 3 | 3 | 3 | 4 | 3 | 4 | 4 | 4 | 5 | 6 | 6 | 6 | 6 | 6 | 5 | 5 | 4 | 5 | 5 | 5 |
| Eyüpspor | 2 | 2 | 2 | 4 | 2 | 3 | 4 | 3 | 4 | 3 | 3 | 3 | 3 | 3 | 4 | 4 | 4 | 5 | 5 | 4 | 4 | 3 | 4 | 3 | 3 | 3 | 4 | 5 | 5 | 4 | 5 | 5 | 6 | 6 | 6 | 6 | 6 | 6 |
| Samsunspor | 13 | 6 | 10 | 7 | 9 | 9 | 7 | 8 | 8 | 9 | 12 | 9 | 10 | 9 | 7 | 6 | 6 | 7 | 7 | 8 | 8 | 7 | 7 | 7 | 7 | 7 | 7 | 7 | 7 | 7 | 8 | 7 | 9 | 7 | 7 | 8 | 9 | 7 |
| Boluspor | 15 | 17 | 18 | 14 | 8 | 8 | 12 | 12 | 16 | 10 | 11 | 13 | 15 | 13 | 11 | 11 | 12 | 13 | 14 | 10 | 12 | 13 | 11 | 12 | 10 | 9 | 10 | 10 | 10 | 11 | 13 | 17 | 14 | 16 | 14 | 14 | 12 | 8 |
| Manisa | 5 | 4 | 3 | 3 | 5 | 7 | 9 | 11 | 15 | 17 | 16 | 17 | 16 | 16 | 15 | 15 | 14 | 12 | 12 | 14 | 11 | 10 | 10 | 10 | 12 | 11 | 8 | 9 | 9 | 8 | 7 | 8 | 7 | 8 | 9 | 10 | 8 | 9 |
| Tuzlaspor | 12 | 5 | 4 | 2 | 4 | 5 | 6 | 6 | 7 | 7 | 8 | 7 | 6 | 6 | 6 | 7 | 8 | 10 | 10 | 11 | 9 | 9 | 9 | 9 | 9 | 10 | 11 | 12 | 13 | 12 | 10 | 10 | 10 | 9 | 8 | 7 | 7 | 10 |
| Denizlispor | 18 | 19 | 19 | 16 | 11 | 15 | 16 | 15 | 12 | 14 | 14 | 14 | 12 | 14 | 16 | 17 | 17 | 18 | 18 | 18 | 18 | 18 | 18 | 18 | 17 | 17 | 16 | 16 | 17 | 16 | 16 | 15 | 12 | 15 | 12 | 12 | 13 | 11 |
| Ankara Keçiörengücü | 9 | 12 | 8 | 10 | 15 | 19 | 19 | 19 | 19 | 18 | 18 | 16 | 17 | 17 | 17 | 16 | 16 | 15 | 16 | 13 | 14 | 11 | 12 | 13 | 11 | 12 | 12 | 11 | 11 | 10 | 11 | 11 | 15 | 12 | 11 | 9 | 10 | 12 |
| Gençlerbirliği | 16 | 15 | 17 | 19 | 17 | 17 | 11 | 9 | 9 | 8 | 9 | 12 | 14 | 12 | 10 | 10 | 11 | 8 | 9 | 9 | 10 | 12 | 14 | 11 | 13 | 13 | 13 | 13 | 14 | 14 | 12 | 12 | 13 | 11 | 13 | 13 | 11 | 13 |
| Altınordu | 8 | 14 | 16 | 11 | 16 | 11 | 14 | 10 | 13 | 15 | 17 | 18 | 18 | 18 | 18 | 18 | 18 | 16 | 13 | 16 | 16 | 16 | 17 | 17 | 18 | 18 | 17 | 17 | 16 | 15 | 15 | 13 | 11 | 13 | 15 | 15 | 15 | 14 |
| Adanaspor | 7 | 10 | 14 | 9 | 13 | 13 | 15 | 16 | 14 | 16 | 13 | 10 | 9 | 10 | 12 | 12 | 9 | 11 | 8 | 7 | 7 | 8 | 8 | 8 | 8 | 8 | 9 | 8 | 8 | 9 | 9 | 9 | 8 | 10 | 10 | 11 | 14 | 15 |
| Kocaelispor | 19 | 16 | 9 | 12 | 7 | 10 | 8 | 7 | 5 | 6 | 6 | 6 | 7 | 8 | 9 | 9 | 10 | 9 | 11 | 12 | 13 | 14 | 15 | 14 | 15 | 15 | 14 | 14 | 15 | 17 | 17 | 16 | 17 | 14 | 16 | 17 | 17 | 16 |
| Bursaspor | 10 | 13 | 15 | 18 | 14 | 16 | 18 | 18 | 17 | 11 | 7 | 11 | 11 | 15 | 14 | 14 | 15 | 17 | 17 | 17 | 17 | 17 | 16 | 16 | 16 | 16 | 18 | 18 | 18 | 18 | 18 | 18 | 18 | 18 | 17 | 16 | 16 | 17 |
| Menemenspor | 4 | 7 | 13 | 17 | 12 | 12 | 10 | 13 | 10 | 12 | 15 | 15 | 13 | 11 | 13 | 13 | 13 | 14 | 15 | 15 | 15 | 15 | 13 | 15 | 14 | 14 | 15 | 15 | 12 | 13 | 14 | 14 | 16 | 17 | 18 | 18 | 18 | 18 |
| Balıkesirspor | 6 | 8 | 12 | 15 | 19 | 14 | 17 | 17 | 18 | 19 | 19 | 19 | 19 | 19 | 19 | 19 | 19 | 19 | 19 | 19 | 19 | 19 | 19 | 19 | 19 | 19 | 19 | 19 | 19 | 19 | 19 | 19 | 19 | 19 | 19 | 19 | 19 | 19 |

| Champion, Promotion to Süper Lig |
| Promotion to Süper Lig |
| Play-off |
| TFF Second League |

Source: TFF

== Results ==
| Home \ Away | ADA | ATO | AKG | BAL | BAN | BOL | BUR | BBE | DEN | EYÜ | GEN | İST | KOC | MFK | MEN | AGÜ | SAM | TUZ | ÜMR |
|---|---|---|---|---|---|---|---|---|---|---|---|---|---|---|---|---|---|---|---|
| Adanaspor | — | 1–0 | 0–1 | 3–1 | 1–5 | 1–2 | 3–1 | 1–1 | 0–0 | 1–1 | 0–0 | 1–0 | 2–0 | 2–0 | 6–2 | 1–0 | 1–0 | 1–1 | 0–0 |
| Altınordu | 2–0 | — | 2–3 | 2–1 | 0–2 | 2–1 | 2–1 | 1–0 | 2–1 | 1–2 | 1–2 | 0–5 | 3–2 | 1–0 | 1–0 | 2–1 | 0–2 | 1–3 | 0–2 |
| Ankara Keçiörengücü | 2–0 | 1–1 | — | 3–1 | 3–2 | 0–3 | 2–1 | 3–3 | 0–1 | 0–0 | 2–0 | 3–2 | 0–1 | 2–1 | 1–0 | 1–2 | 1–1 | 1–0 | 3–2 |
| Balıkesirspor | 1–2 | 3–4 | 2–1 | — | 1–5 | 1–0 | 0–2 | 1–5 | 0–1 | 0–3 | 0–2 | 1–3 | 1–2 | 0–0 | 1–1 | 0–2 | 0–2 | 0–1 | 1–2 |
| Bandırmaspor | 1–0 | 2–1 | 0–2 | 3–0 | — | 3–0 | 4–2 | 2–1 | 3–4 | 1–2 | 1–2 | 0–0 | 1–0 | 0–0 | 1–0 | 1–2 | 2–0 | 3–1 | 2–0 |
| Boluspor | 0–0 | 2–1 | 0–0 | 1–0 | 0–0 | — | 1–1 | 0–2 | 0–0 | 3–1 | 3–1 | 1–1 | 2–0 | 1–2 | 1–0 | 0–2 | 2–1 | 0–1 | 0–2 |
| Bursaspor | 1–1 | 1–0 | 2–0 | 2–1 | 0–1 | 3–1 | — | 0–0 | 1–0 | 0–2 | 0–0 | 2–4 | 2–1 | 1–1 | 1–0 | 0–4 | 4–1 | 0–1 | 3–2 |
| BB Erzurumspor | 3–1 | 6–2 | 2–2 | 2–1 | 1–0 | 3–2 | 2–1 | — | 3–1 | 1–1 | 2–0 | 3–1 | 1–0 | 1–0 | 1–1 | 0–1 | 1–2 | 1–1 | 0–2 |
| Denizlispor | 2–0 | 1–0 | 2–1 | 2–1 | 0–2 | 2–0 | 1–3 | 4–0 | — | 2–2 | 2–1 | 4–3 | 1–1 | 0–1 | 2–1 | 0–3 | 2–3 | 2–4 | 0–1 |
| Eyüpspor | 1–0 | 2–2 | 2–1 | 1–1 | 2–0 | 0–2 | 3–0 | 0–1 | 0–2 | — | 1–0 | 1–2 | 2–1 | 3–2 | 1–1 | 2–0 | 2–2 | 2–0 | 0–1 |
| Gençlerbirliği | 0–3 | 3–2 | 2–0 | 2–0 | 2–0 | 1–0 | 2–0 | 2–1 | 1–0 | 2–4 | — | 0–2 | 1–1 | 0–3 | 5–0 | 0–3 | 2–2 | 0–1 | 2–4 |
| İstanbulspor | 1–1 | 3–0 | 1–1 | 1–0 | 0–0 | 1–2 | 3–1 | 1–2 | 1–1 | 2–1 | 0–0 | — | 1–1 | 3–4 | 3–2 | 0–1 | 2–1 | 1–0 | 1–0 |
| Kocaelispor | 4–1 | 2–2 | 1–0 | 3–1 | 2–1 | 1–2 | 2–1 | 2–0 | 1–5 | 1–1 | 1–2 | 2–1 | — | 2–1 | 1–2 | 1–2 | 1–0 | 1–0 | 0–3 |
| Manisa | 0–3 | 1–0 | 1–1 | 3–0 | 1–3 | 2–2 | 1–3 | 0–1 | 1–0 | 2–1 | 3–1 | 1–2 | 2–1 | — | 1–1 | 1–1 | 2–0 | 4–1 | 2–1 |
| Menemenspor | 2–1 | 0–1 | 2–2 | 2–1 | 1–1 | 3–2 | 0–0 | 2–0 | 0–0 | 1–1 | 1–3 | 1–3 | 1–1 | 2–0 | — | 1–1 | 3–2 | 1–1 | 0–4 |
| MKE Ankaragücü | 2–0 | 2–3 | 2–1 | 2–0 | 1–0 | 1–2 | 2–1 | 2–1 | 2–1 | 2–3 | 2–0 | 0–1 | 0–0 | 2–1 | 2–2 | — | 0–0 | 1–0 | 3–0 |
| Samsunspor | 1–0 | 2–1 | 2–0 | 3–1 | 0–1 | 1–1 | 1–1 | 0–0 | 5–0 | 2–2 | 2–2 | 0–0 | 3–0 | 1–0 | 2–4 | 2–0 | — | 2–2 | 1–1 |
| Tuzlaspor | 4–1 | 2–1 | 1–0 | 0–2 | 0–3 | 3–1 | 0–0 | 1–1 | 3–0 | 3–2 | 4–0 | 0–2 | 0–0 | 0–1 | 1–1 | 1–1 | 2–4 | — | 1–1 |
| Ümraniyespor | 2–1 | 0–1 | 2–1 | 4–1 | 2–0 | 1–2 | 4–1 | 3–3 | 0–0 | 2–2 | 3–1 | 2–0 | 1–0 | 1–0 | 2–1 | 2–2 | 3–1 | 2–1 | — |

Source: TFF
Legend: Blue = home team win; Yellow = draw; Red = away team win.

== Promotion Playoffs ==
=== Semifinals ===
| Team 1 | Agg. | Team 2 | 1st leg | 2nd leg |
|---|---|---|---|---|
| Eyüpspor | 1–3 | Bandırmaspor | 1–0 | 0–3 |
| BB Erzurumspor | 3–4 | İstanbulspor | 2–4 | 1–0 |

First leg

| 25 May 2022 | BB Erzurumspor | 2–4 | İstanbulspor | Erzurum |
| 18:30 (TRT) | Tozlu 80', 90+6' | Report | Yazgan 16'; Rroca 63'; Ethemi 75'; Sarıkaya 86' | Stadium: Kazım Karabekir Stadium; Referee: Sarper Barış Saka |

| 25 May 2022 | Eyüpspor | 1–0 | Bandırmaspor | Eyüp, Istanbul |
| 21:00 (TRT) | Tashkin 49' | Report | | Stadium: Eyüp Stadium; Referee: Erkan Özdamar |

Second leg

| 29 May 2022 | Bandırmaspor | 3–0 | Eyüpspor | Bandırma, Balıkesir |
| 15:30 (TRT) | Kény 5' (pen.); Koldaş 45+1'; Landel 58' | Report | | Stadium: Bandırma 17 Eylül Stadium; Referee: Suat Arslanboğa |

| 29 May 2022 | İstanbulspor | 0–1 | BB Erzurumspor | Esenyurt, Istanbul |
| 18:00 (TRT) | | Report | Novikovas 87' (pen.) | Stadium: Necmi Kadıoğlu Stadium; Referee: Atilla Karaoğlan |

=== Final ===
| 2 June 2022 | Bandırmaspor | 1–2 | İstanbulspor | İzmit |
| 20:00 (TRT) | Kény 45+3' (pen.) | Report | Yılmaz 33', 45+9' (pen.) | Stadium: Kocaeli Stadium |

== Statistics ==
=== Top goalscorers ===
As of matches played 21 May 2022

Top goalscorers
| Rank | Player | Team | Goals |
|---|---|---|---|
| 1 | (Germany) Ahmet Sagat | Menemenspor | 17 |
| 2 | (Turkey) İbrahim Yılmaz | İstanbulspor | 16 |
| 2 | (Nigeria) Emeka Friday Eze | Ankara Keçiörengücü | 16 |
| 4 | (Turkey) Umut Bulut | Eyüpspor | 14 |
| 5 | (Turkey) Ömer Şişmanoğlu | Denizlispor | 13 |
| 5 | (Brazil) Sandro Lima | Gençlerbirliği | 13 |
| 7 | (Turkey) Yasin Öztekin | Samsunspor | 12 |
| 7 | (Democratic Republic of the Congo) Kabongo Kasongo | Boluspor | 12 |
| 9 | (Turkey) Ahmet İlhan Özek | Altınordu | 11 |
| 9 | (The Gambia) Pa Dibba | Eyüpspor | 11 |
| 9 | (Senegal) Philippe Kény | Bandırmaspor | 11 |
