= Ömer Erdoğan =

Turkish footballer (born 1977)

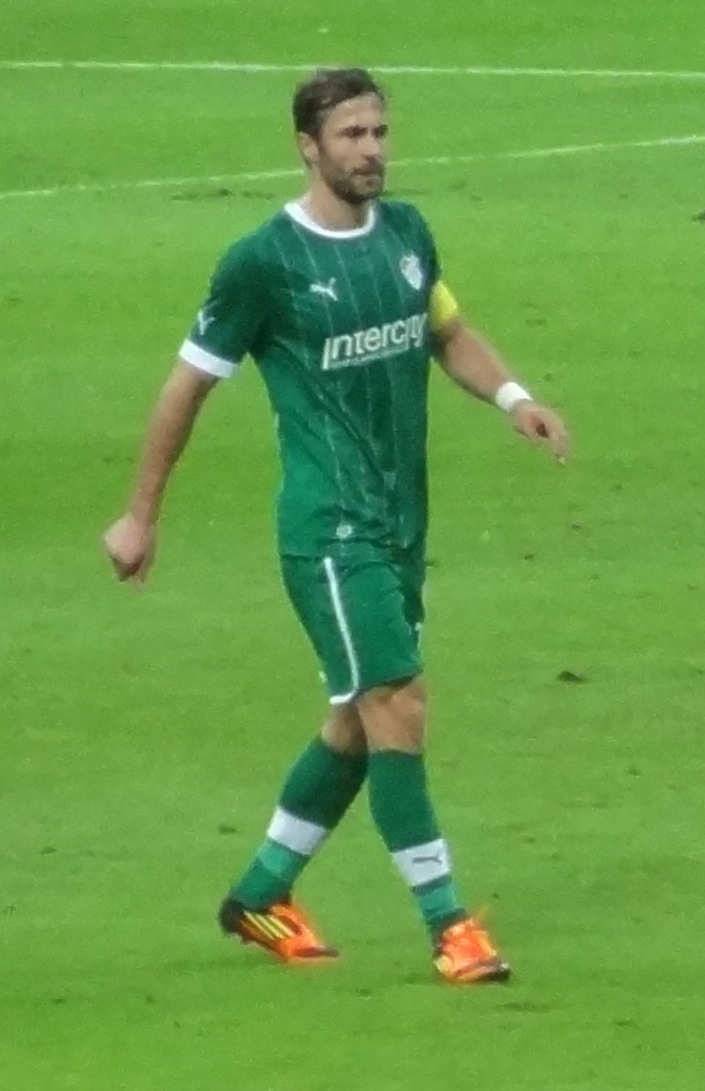

Personal information
- Full name: Ömer Erdoğan
- Date of birth: 3 May 1977 (age 49)
- Place of birth: Kassel, West Germany
- Height: 1.91 m (6 ft 3 in)
- Position: Centre back

Senior career*
Years	Team	Apps	(Gls)
1996–1997	KSV Hessen Kassel	0	(0)
1997–1998	FC St. Pauli	14	(2)
1998–2001	Erzurumspor	98	(4)
2001–2003	Diyarbakırspor	63	(2)
2003–2004	Galatasaray	20	(2)
2004–2006	Malatyaspor	58	(6)
2006–2013	Bursaspor	173	(13)
Total		426	(29)

International career
2003	Turkey B	1	(0)
2010	Turkey	3	(0)

Managerial career
- 2013–2014: Eskişehirspor (U21 assistant)
- 2014–2015: Eskişehirspor (assistant)
- 2015: Bursaspor (assistant)
- 2018–2019: Bursaspor (assistant)
- 2020: Fatih Karagümrük
- 2020–2022: Hatayspor
- 2022–2023: MKE Ankaragücü
- 2023: Alanyaspor
- 2024–2025: Sivasspor
- * Club domestic league appearances and goals

Ömer Erdoğan (born 3 May 1977) is a Turkish football manager and former player who last coached Sivasspor.

== Playing career ==
Erdoğan began his professional career in Germany. He signed with KSV Hessen Kassel when he was 17, and moved to FC St. Pauli the following year. Erdoğan played with fellow Turkish-German footballers Deniz Barış and Cem Karaca at the time. Erdoğan was transferred to Erzurumspor in 1998. Bursaspor courted Erdoğan in 1998, but he chose to sign with Erzurumspor instead. He would end up signing for Bursaspor in 2006.

Erdoğan had a successful stint at Diyarbakırspor from 2001 to 2003. At the end of the 2002–03 season, 15–16 clubs were interested in signing the centre back. He eventually signed for Galatasaray, citing Fatih Terim, then manager of the Istanbul-based club, as the main reason behind the move. He was a part of the Bursaspor squad that won the Süper Lig in 2009–10.

== Coaching career ==
On 29 August 2022, the day after the resignation of Mustafa Dalcı, Erdoğan became the new manager of Süper Lig club MKE Ankaragücü.

== Honours ==
Bursaspor

- Süper Lig: 2009–10

== See also ==
- Ömer Erdoğan: "Büyük olmak için bir şampiyonluk yetmez" — an extensive interview with Erdoğan (in Turkish)
