= Cem Karaca (footballer) =

Turkish footballer (born 1976)

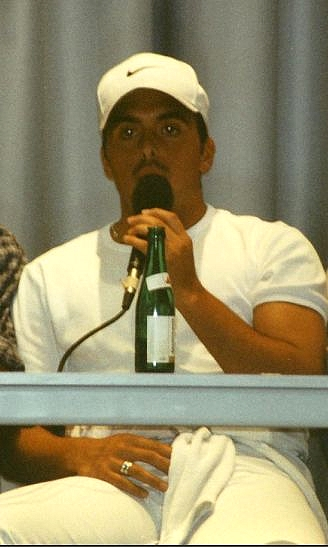
- Karaca in 1997

Personal information
- Date of birth: 8 May 1976 (age 50)
- Place of birth: Hofheim, West Germany
- Height: 1.69 m (5 ft 7 in)
- Position: Midfielder

Senior career*
Years	Team	Apps	(Gls)
1995–1997	1. FC Kaiserslautern		
1997–2000	FC St. Pauli	75	(5)
2000–2002	Yimpaş Yozgatspor	45	(4)
2002–2003	Fenerbahçe	13	(0)
2003–2004	Konyaspor	44	(2)
2005	Kayserispor	16	(1)
2005–2007	Sivasspor	37	(0)
2007–2008	İstanbulspor		

Managerial career
- 2010–2011: TFC Hattersheim (player-coach)
- 2011–2012: TSV Wiesbaden (player-coach)
- 2013: TSV Wiesbaden (player-coach)
- 2018: Karacabey Belediyespor (assistant)
- 2018: Karacabey Belediyespor
- 2018: FSV Duisburg (assistant)
- 2019: Aiginiakos
- 2019–2020: Eskişehirspor (assistant)
- 2020: Ankaraspor (assistant)
- 2021: Eskişehirspor
- 2022: Erzurumspor (assistant)
- * Club domestic league appearances and goals

Cem Karaca (born 8 May 1976) is a Turkish-German football coach and former player who played as a midfielder.

== Club career ==
He started his career in Germany playing for 1. FC Kaiserslautern and FC St. Pauli before spending most of his career in Turkey with Yimpaş Yozgatspor, Fenerbahçe, Konyaspor, Kayserispor, Sivasspor, and İstanbulspor.

He played once for the Turkish B national team and three times for the U21.

In the 2000–01 season, he was suspended from football for six months after doping test.
