= Görkem Can =

Turkish footballer

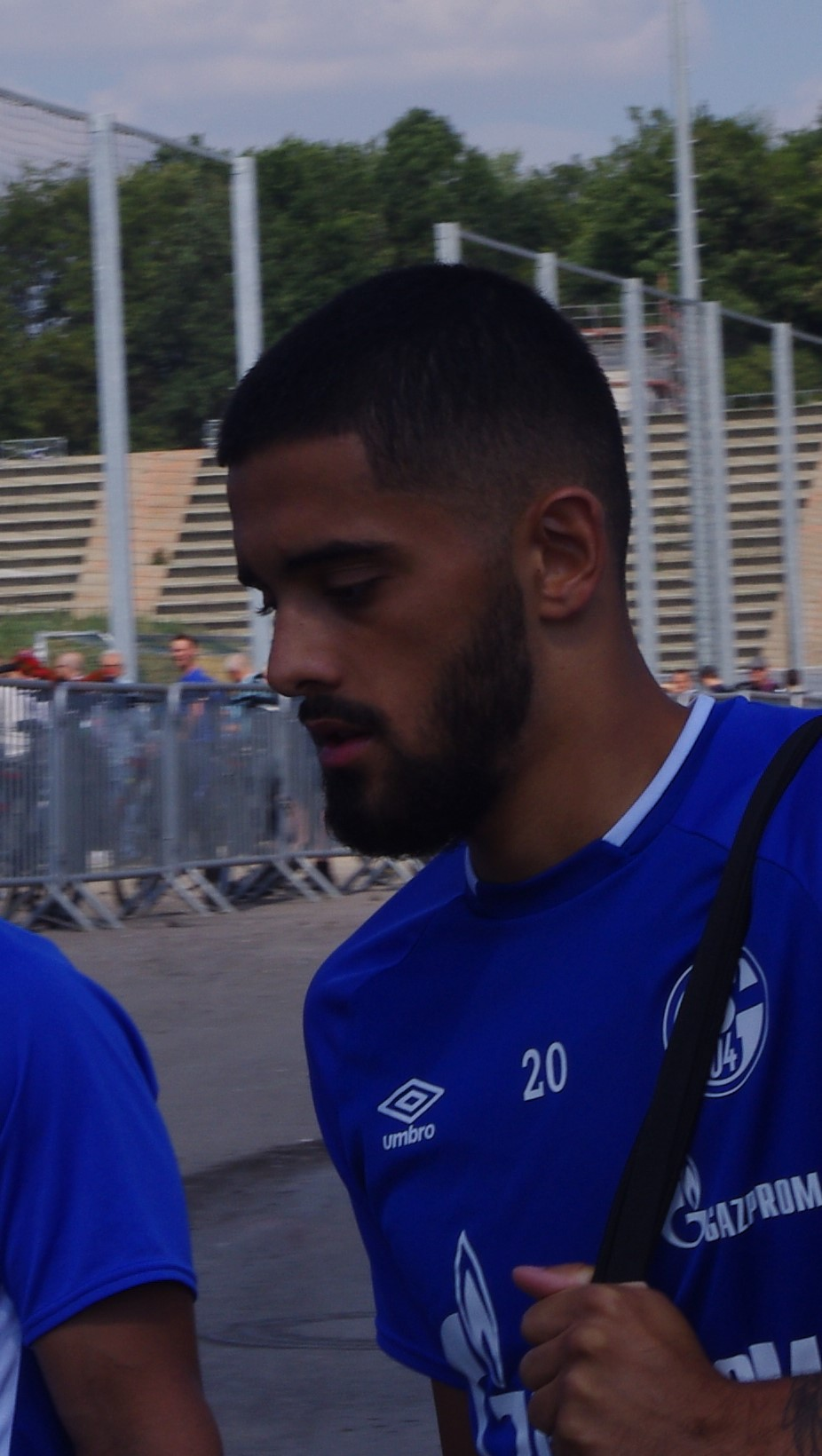
- Can with Schalke 04

Personal information
- Date of birth: 4 May 2000 (age 26)
- Place of birth: Gelsenkirchen, Germany
- Height: 1.86 m (6 ft 1 in)
- Position: Defender

Youth career
- 2013–2017: Bochum
- 2017–2019: Schalke 04

Senior career*
Years	Team	Apps	(Gls)
2019–2020	Schalke 04 II	2	(0)
2020–2021	Groningen	0	(0)
2021	Denizlispor	5	(0)

International career
2015–2016	Germany U16	2	(0)
2017	Germany U17	1	(0)
2019	Turkey U19	2	(0)
2019	Turkey U20	1	(0)
- * Club domestic league appearances and goals as of 13:57, 9 April 2022 (UTC)

Görkem Can (born 4 May 2000) is a professional footballer who plays as a defender. Born in Germany, Can represents Turkey internationally.

== Club career ==
A youth product of VfL Bochum, Can joined the youth academy of Schalke 04 in 2017. On 30 March 2019, he signed his professional contract with Schalke 04, and went on to represent their reserve side.

On 25 January 2020, he signed a 2.5-year contract with the Dutch club Groningen. Almost exactly one year later after a lack of appearances, he transferred to Denizlispor in Turkey. He made his professional debut as a late sub with Denizlispor in a 6–2 Süper Lig loss to Kayserispor on 28 April 2021.

== International career ==
Can was born in Germany and is of Turkish descent. He represented the Germany U16s and Germany U17s before switching to represent Turkey. In 2019, he was capped by the Turkey U19s and Turkey U20s.
