= Costel Pantilimon =

Romanian footballer (born 1987)

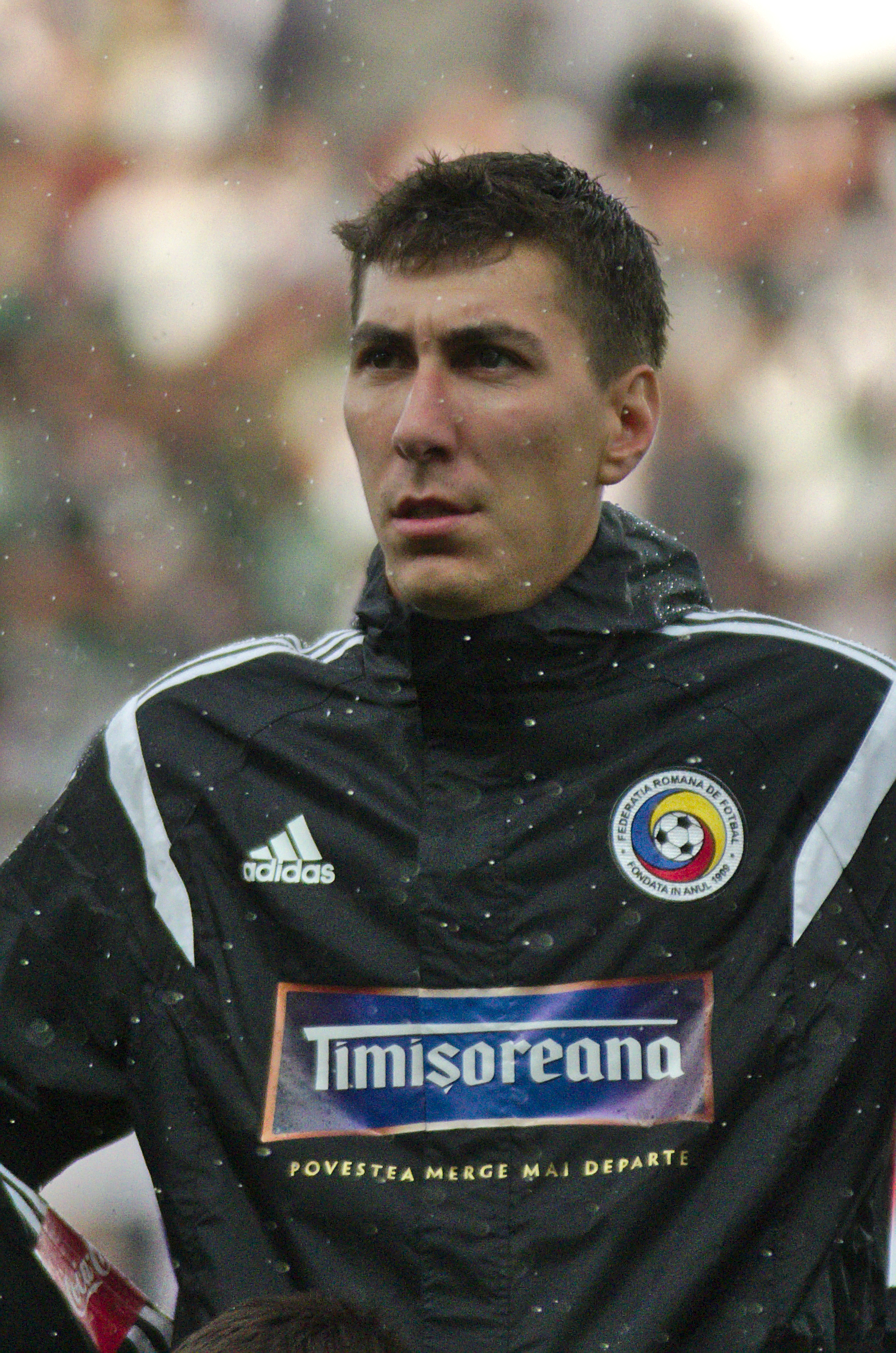
- Pantilimon with Romania in June 2014

Personal information
- Full name: Costel Fane Pantilimon
- Date of birth: 1 February 1987 (age 39)
- Place of birth: Bacău, Romania
- Height: 2.03 m (6 ft 8 in)
- Position: Goalkeeper

Youth career
- 1993–2003: Aerostar Bacău

Senior career*
Years	Team	Apps	(Gls)
2003–2006	Aerostar Bacău	80	(0)
2006–2008	Politehnica II Timișoara	26	(0)
2006–2012	Politehnica Timișoara	93	(0)
2011–2012	→ Manchester City (loan)	0	(0)
2012–2014	Manchester City	7	(0)
2014–2016	Sunderland	45	(0)
2016–2018	Watford	2	(0)
2017–2018	→ Deportivo La Coruña (loan)	6	(0)
2018	→ Nottingham Forest (loan)	13	(0)
2018–2020	Nottingham Forest	44	(0)
2020	→ Omonia (loan)	6	(0)
2020–2021	Denizlispor	15	(0)
Total		337	(0)

International career
2003–2004	Romania U17	5	(0)
2005	Romania U19	3	(0)
2006–2008	Romania U21	12	(0)
2008–2019	Romania	27	(0)

Managerial career
- 2023–2024: ASU Politehnica Timișoara (general manager)
- * Club domestic league appearances and goals

Costel Fane Pantilimon (Romanian pronunciation: [kosˈtel pantiliˈmon]; born 1 February 1987) is a Romanian former professional footballer who played as a goalkeeper.

As a player, Pantilimon began his career at Politehnica Timișoara. In 2011, he signed for Premier League team Manchester City on an initial loan, serving as a backup to Joe Hart. Pantilimon was first choice for City in their 2013–14 League Cup conquest, after which he promptly moved to Sunderland. He transferred to Watford in 2016, but only made two Premier League appearances before being loaned to Deportivo La Coruña and Nottingham Forest. Pantilimon signed a permanent deal with Forest in 2018, and spent his later years at Omonia and Denizlispor before retiring.

Pantilimon was an international for Romania from 2008 to 2017, being capped 27 times during the period. He was selected by the country in their UEFA Euro 2016 squad, but did not play in any game.

== Club career ==
=== Early career ===
Born in Bacău, Pantilimon started his career at Aerostar Bacău and got his share of limelight at the Romania national under-19 team before transferring to Politehnica Timișoara on 1 February 2006, his 19th birthday.

=== Politehnica Timișoara ===
Initially, Pantilimon was Timișoara's second-choice goalkeeper, behind Marius Popa. In May 2008, however, the owner of the club, Marian Iancu, transferred Popa to the second team, and Pantilimon took the pole position. He made his debut in the Romanian Liga 1 against Dinamo București, in March 2007.

In a match against Ceahlăul on 17 October 2009, Pantilimon captained the team for the first time, since Dan Alexa, Gigel Bucur and Arman Karamyan and his brother Artavazd were all on the bench.

Pantilimon was part of the Timișoara team that defeated UEFA Cup winners Shakhtar Donetsk in the qualifying rounds of the 2009–10 UEFA Champions League campaign. He played all 90 minutes of each leg.

=== Manchester City ===
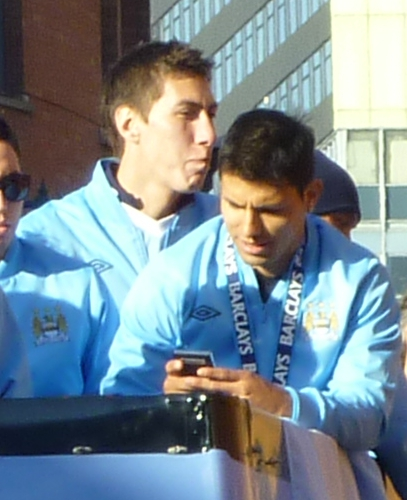
Pantilimon (left) with Sergio Agüero on Manchester City's Premier League victory parade, May 2012

On 11 August 2011, Pantilimon joined Manchester City on a one-year loan deal from Politehnica Timișoara to act as cover for Joe Hart following the departure of Shay Given.

Pantilimon's first start was a League Cup win against holders Birmingham City on 21 September 2011. His next match was on 26 October, against Wolverhampton Wanderers in the same competition, where City fielded a second-string team, although still comprehensively won 5–2. Pantilimon got his next Manchester City start during the 1–0 League Cup quarter-final win against Arsenal at the Emirates Stadium. In the Arsenal match, he was named Man of the Match, making two saves in the first half. He started the third round of the FA Cup against Manchester United at the City of Manchester Stadium on 8 January 2012, saving Wayne Rooney's penalty but was unable to save the follow-up; Manchester City lost the game 3–2.

Pantilimon's loan deal was made permanent for an undisclosed fee. He was contracted to City until 2016. During the 2012–13 FA Cup, he kept four clean sheets in a row and managed an outstanding performance against Chelsea in the semi-final, conceding just one goal in five matches. In response to this performance, then City manager Roberto Mancini immediately promised that the Romanian would keep his place when the team return to Wembley Stadium to face Wigan Athletic on 11 May. However, he was a substitute in the final, with Joe Hart starting; Manchester City lost to Wigan 1–0. It was later revealed that Mancini had promised on the eve of the FA Cup Final that the Romanian would play, but then deputed the goalkeeping coach on match day morning to say there had been a change of plan.

Pantilimon was given his first start of the 2013–14 season for City in the Football League Cup third-round match at home to Wigan on 24 September 2013, which City won 5–0; manager Manuel Pellegrini praised him for keeping a clean sheet. Five weeks later, Pantilimon was also selected to start in the next League Cup match away to Newcastle United on 30 October; once again, he conceded no goals, as City won 2–0 and progressed to the last eight of the competition. Three days later, he made his Premier League debut at home to Norwich City, keeping his third clean sheet in a row in an emphatic 7–0 victory. On 7 November 2013, he started in Champions League game against CSKA Moscow that ended in City winning 5–2. He started his second Premier League game on 10 November 2013 away against Sunderland that ended in a 0–1 defeat.

On 2 March 2014, Pantilimon started for Manchester City in the 2014 League Cup Final at Wembley Stadium. The team won 3–1 against Sunderland with goals from Yaya Touré, Samir Nasri and Jesús Navas.

Overall, Pantilimon made seven appearances during the 2013–14 Premier League season, keeping three clean sheets as Manchester City won a second league title in three years. He was also the team's first-choice goalkeeper for their League Cup and FA Cup matches.

=== Sunderland ===
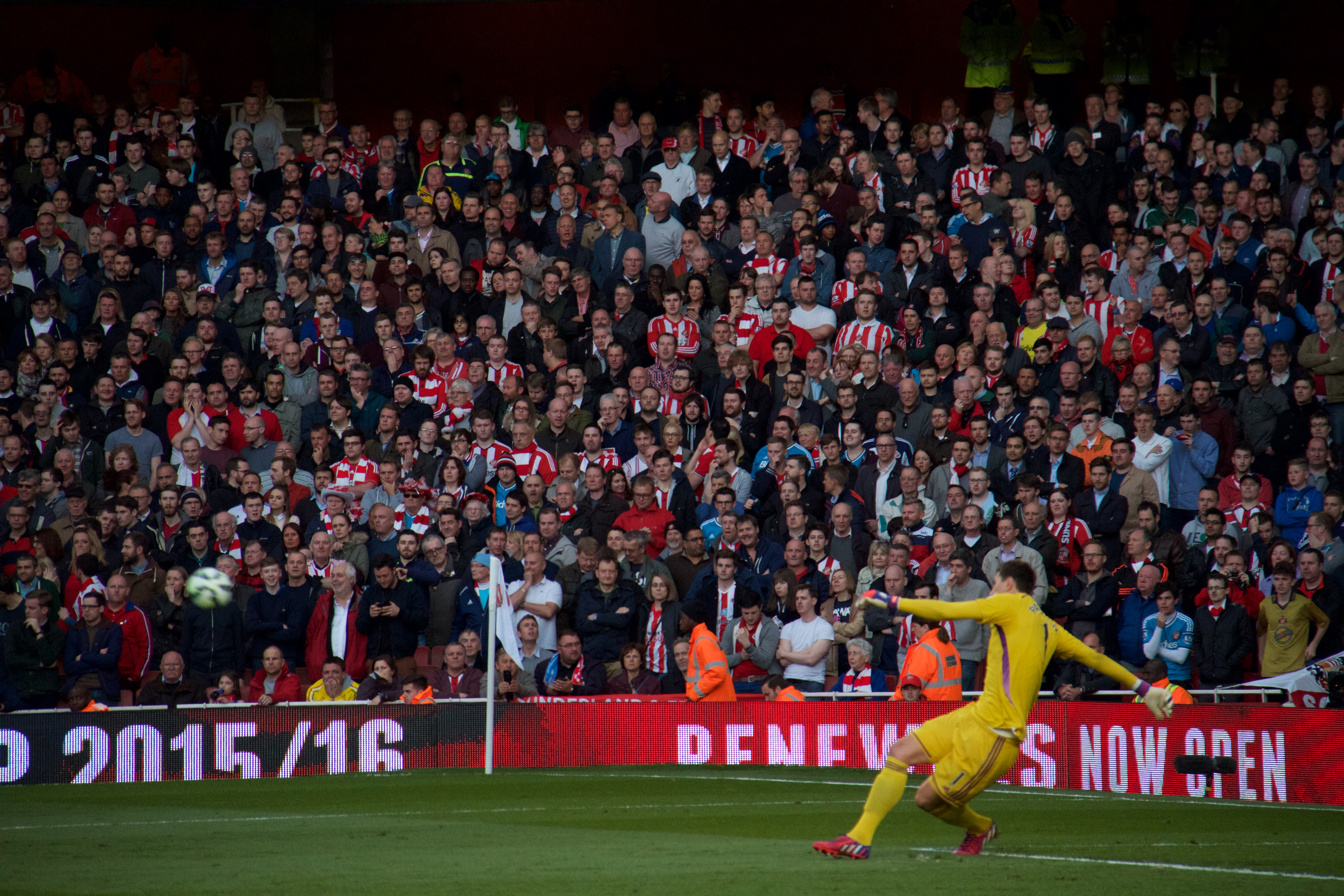
Pantilimon taking a goal-kick for Sunderland

On 16 June 2014, Pantilimon joined Sunderland on a free transfer from Manchester City. On 27 August, he made his first appearance for the club in the second round of the League Cup second round against Birmingham City, keeping a clean sheet in a 3–0 win at St Andrew's. Pantilimon started the season as back-up for Vito Mannone, but after poor performances in an 8–0 loss to Southampton and a 2–0 loss to Arsenal, the Italian was subsequently dropped and Pantilimon made his Premier League debut for Sunderland in a 3–1 win at Crystal Palace on 3 November 2014, thus becoming the club's first choice keeper for the rest of the season. He started the next season as first choice before losing his place to Mannone, eventually dropping to third choice behind Jordan Pickford.

=== Watford ===
On 19 January 2016, Pantilimon joined Premier League rivals Watford on a three-and-a-half-year deal, for an undisclosed fee. He made his first appearance for the Hornets on 30 January in their FA Cup fourth-round victory at Nottingham Forest. He also started the game in the fifth round against Leeds United. He kept clean sheets in both games. He made his Premier League debut for the Hornets in a forgettable 6–1 defeat at Liverpool on 6 November 2016, after Heurelho Gomes was injured during the first half.

On 1 September 2017, Pantilimon joined La Liga club Deportivo La Coruña on a one-year loan from Watford, lasting until 20 May 2018. The long-term absence of first-choice keeper Rubén, who suffered a hand injury in training, prompted the signing. Pantilimon made his debut for the Galicians against Real Betis on 16 September. The following week, Pantilimon picked up his first clean sheet, coming in a 1–0 win over Alavés.

=== Nottingham Forest ===
On 31 January 2018, Pantilimon left Spain to return to England and sign on loan for EFL Championship side Nottingham Forest until the end of the 2017–18 season. He made his full début away at Fulham on 3 February. He made his home début against Hull City the following week, saving a penalty from Jon Toral. He made the English Football League's Team of the Week after producing a clean sheet at Burton Albion when Forest were reduced to ten men for much of the match on 17 February.

On 3 July 2018, Pantilimon signed a three-year deal with Forest.

On 30 January 2020, Pantilimon was loaned to Cypriot First Division side Omonia for the remainder of the season.

=== Denizlispor ===
On 4 September 2020, Pantilimon joined Turkish Süper Lig side Denizlispor following a mutual termination of his contract at Nottingham Forest.

== International career ==
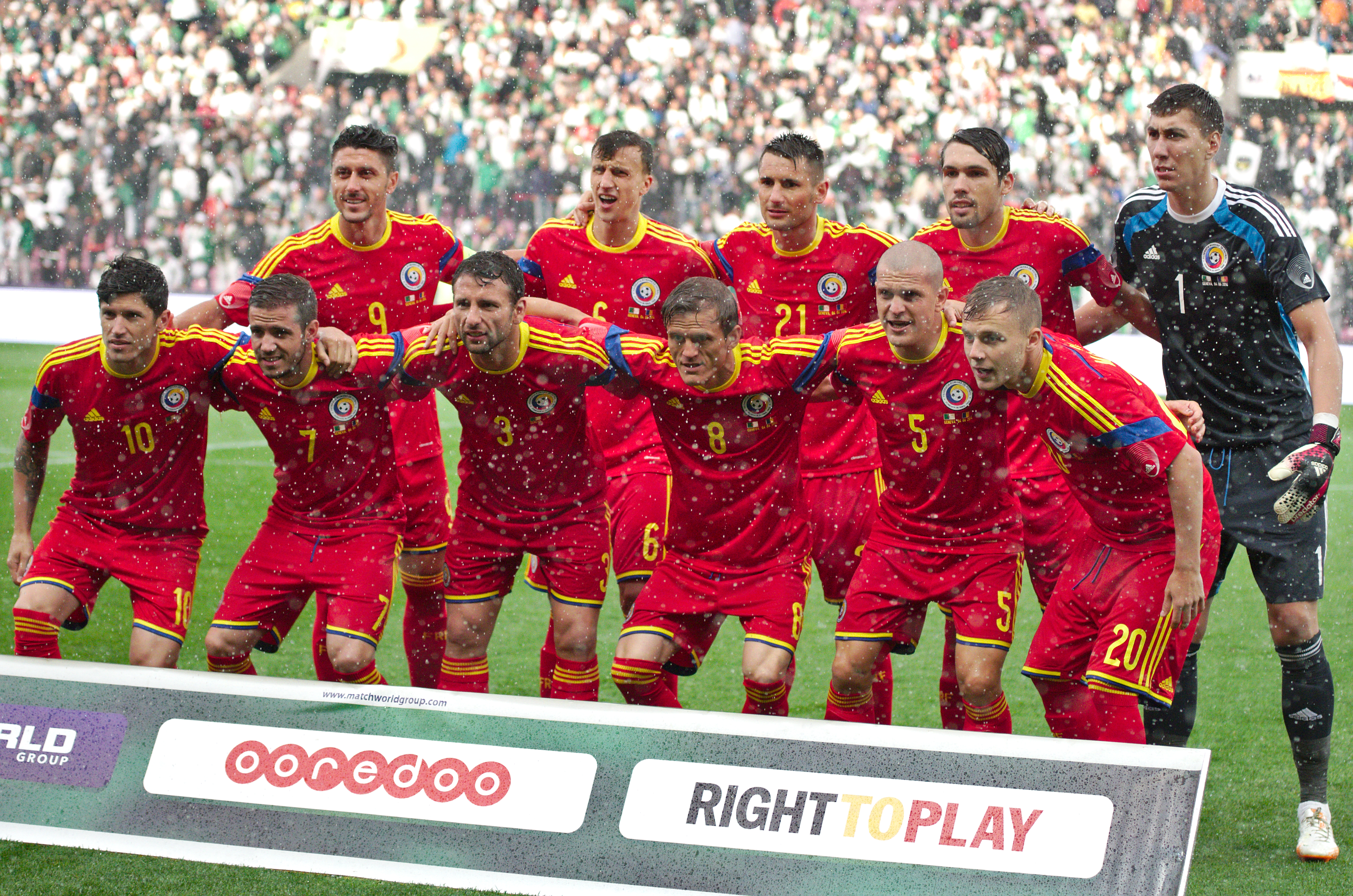
Pantilimon (far right) in the Romania team ahead of a match against Algeria in 2014

Pantilimon is a former Romania under-21 international. He made his debut for the senior Romania national team on 19 November 2008, in a friendly against Georgia. On 31 May 2016, Pantilimon was included in the final 23-man squad for UEFA Euro 2016, but did not appear in all matches in this tournament; Romanian coach Anghel Iordănescu used Ciprian Tătărușanu as the nation's first-choice.

== Personal life ==
Pantilimon is a hearing child of two deaf parents. He married Andreea Berbece in 2013.

== Career statistics ==
=== Club ===
Appearances and goals by club, season and competition
Club	Season	League			National cup (Note: Includes Cupa României, FA Cup, Copa del Rey, Cypriot Cup)		League cup (Note: Includes EFL Cup)		Europe		Other		Total	
Club	Season	Division	Apps	Goals	Apps	Goals	Apps	Goals	Apps	Goals	Apps	Goals	Apps	Goals
Aerostar Bacău	2003–04	Divizia C					—		—		—			
Aerostar Bacău	2004–05	Divizia C					—		—		—			
Aerostar Bacău	2005–06	Divizia C					—		—		—			
Aerostar Bacău	Total		80	0			—		—		—		80	0
Politehnica II Timișoara	2006–07	Liga II	17	0	—		—		—		—		17	0
Politehnica II Timișoara	2007–08	Liga II	9	0	—		—		—		—		9	0
Politehnica II Timișoara	Total		26	0	—		—		—		—		26	0
Politehnica Timișoara	2005–06	Divizia A	0	0	—		—		—		—		0	0
Politehnica Timișoara	2006–07	Liga I	8	0	2	0	—		—		—		10	0
Politehnica Timișoara	2007–08	Liga I	5	0	0	0	—		—		—		5	0
Politehnica Timișoara	2008–09	Liga I	31	0	5	0	—		2 (Note: Appearances in UEFA Cup)	0	—		38	0
Politehnica Timișoara	2009–10	Liga I	21	0	0	0	—		9 (Note: Four appearances in UEFA Champions League, five appearances in UEFA Europa League)	0	—		30	0
Politehnica Timișoara	2010–11	Liga I	28	0	1	0	—		3 (Note: Appearances in UEFA Europa League)	0	—		32	0
Politehnica Timișoara	Total		93	0	8	0	—		14	0	—		115	0
Manchester City (loan)	2011–12	Premier League	0	0	1	0	4	0	0	0	—		5	0
Manchester City	2012–13	Premier League	0	0	5	0	1	0	0	0	1 (Note: Appearance in the Community Shield)	0	7	0
Manchester City	2013–14	Premier League	7	0	5	0	5	0	1 (Note: Appearance in the UEFA Champions League)	0	—		18	0
Manchester City	Manchester total		7	0	11	0	10	0	1	0	1	0	30	0
Sunderland	2014–15	Premier League	28	0	1	0	2	0	—		—		31	0
Sunderland	2015–16	Premier League	17	0	0	0	1	0	—		—		18	0
Sunderland	Total		45	0	1	0	3	0	—		—		49	0
Watford	2015–16	Premier League	0	0	4	0	—		—		—		4	0
Watford	2016–17	Premier League	2	0	2	0	1	0	—		—		5	0
Watford	2017–18	Premier League	0	0	—		0	0	—		—		0	0
Watford	Total		2	0	6	0	1	0	—		—		9	0
Deportivo La Coruña (loan)	2017–18	La Liga	6	0	1	0	—		—		—		7	0
Nottingham Forest (loan)	2017–18	Championship	13	0	—		—		—		—		13	0
Nottingham Forest	2018–19	Championship	44	0	0	0	0	0	—		—		44	0
Nottingham Forest	2019–20	Championship	0	0	0	0	0	0	—		—		0	0
Nottingham Forest	Nottingham total		57	0	0	0	0	0	—		—		57	0
Omonia (loan)	2019–20	Cypriot First Division	6	0	1	0	—		—		—		7	0
Denizlispor	2020–21	Süper Lig	15	0	0	0	—		—		—		15	0
Career total			337	0	28	0	14	0	15	0	1	0	395	0

=== International ===
Appearances and goals by national team and year
National team	Year	Apps	Goals
Romania	2008	1	0
Romania	2009	3	0
Romania	2010	5	0
Romania	2011	5	0
Romania	2012	0	0
Romania	2013	2	0
Romania	2014	3	0
Romania	2015	1	0
Romania	2016	4	0
Romania	2017	3	0
Total		27	0

== Honours ==
Politehnica Timișoara

- Cupa României runner-up: 2006–07, 2008–09

Manchester City

- Premier League: 2011–12, 2013–14
- Football League Cup: 2013–14
- FA Community Shield: 2012
- FA Cup runner-up: 2012–13
