= Zafer Turan =

Turkish footballer

Personal information
- Date of birth: 9 October 1969 (age 57)
- Place of birth: Zonguldak, Turkey

Managerial career
- Years: Team
- 2002: Göztepe (assistant)
- 2003–2007: İstanbul Büyükşehir Belediyesi (youth/assistant)
- 2007–2012: İstanbul Büyükşehir Belediyesi (assistant)
- 2013: Anadolu Selçukluspor
- 2013: Bugsas Spor
- 2014: Göztepe
- 2014: Anadolu Selçukluspor
- 2015–2016: Sivas Belediyespor
- 2016–2017: İstanbul Başakşehir (assistant)
- 2017–2018: Erokspor
- 2018–2019: Bayrampaşaspor
- 2019–2022: Eyüpspor
- 2023: Eyüpspor
- 2023: Şanlıurfaspor
- 2024: 1461 Trabzon

Zafer Turan (born 9 October 1969) is a Turkish football manager and former footballer who played as a midfielder.
