= Papa Daniel =

Nigerian footballer (born 2002)

Personal information
- Full name: Papa Daniel Mustapha
- Date of birth: 1 January 2002 (age 24)
- Place of birth: Lagos, Nigeria
- Position: Midfielder

Team information
- Current team: Celje
- Number: 13

Senior career*
Years	Team	Apps	(Gls)
2020–2021	Adanaspor	4	(0)
2024–2025	Niger Tornadoes	21	(4)
2025–	Celje	22	(0)

International career^{‡}
2025–	Nigeria	1	(0)
- * Club domestic league appearances and goals as of 23 July 2026 ‡ National team caps and goals as of 31 May 2026

Papa Daniel Mustapha (born 1 January 2002) is a Nigerian professional footballer who plays as a midfielder for Slovenian PrvaLiga club Celje and the Nigeria national team.

== Club career ==
Papa Daniel has played for Turkish club Adanaspor during the 2020–21 season. In 2025, he joined Slovenian PrvaLiga club Celje, with whom he won the 2025–26 league title.

== International career ==
In March 2025, Papa Daniel was named in Nigeria's squad for the 2026 FIFA World Cup qualification matches against Rwanda and Zimbabwe by head coach Éric Chelle. He made his senior debut for Nigeria during the 2025 Unity Cup tournament.
