= Hasan Ayaroğlu =

Turkish footballer (born 1995)

Personal information
- Date of birth: 22 March 1995 (age 31)
- Place of birth: Çankırı, Turkey
- Height: 1.76 m (5 ft 9 in)
- Position: Winger

Team information
- Current team: Kastamonuspor 1966
- Number: 70

Youth career
- 2005–2012: Ankaragücü

Senior career*
Years	Team	Apps	(Gls)
2012–2015	Ankaragücü	68	(9)
2015–2018	Eskişehirspor	32	(9)
2015–2016	→ Ankaragücü (loan)	25	(4)
2016–2017	→ Kastamonuspor 1966 (loan)	35	(10)
2018–2021	Alanyaspor	13	(0)
2019–2020	→ BB Erzurumspor (loan)	24	(1)
2021	Denizlispor	19	(0)
2021–2023	Bursaspor	55	(7)
2023–2024	Ümraniyespor	29	(1)
2024–2025	Sarıyer	15	(0)
2025	Ankara Keçiörengücü	10	(0)
2025–	Kastamonuspor 1966	6	(3)

International career
2012–2013	Turkey U18	8	(1)
2013–2014	Turkey U19	5	(0)
2015	Turkey U20	3	(0)
- * Club domestic league appearances and goals as of 30 November 2025

Hasan Ayaroğlu (born 22 March 1995) is a Turkish footballer who plays as a winger for TFF 2. Lig club Kastamonuspor 1966.

== Career ==
Ayaroğlu is a youth product of Ankaragücü, having joined their youth academy in 2005. He made his professional debut with Ankaragücü in a 3–0 Süper Lig loss to Antalyaspor on 25 March 2012. In 2015, he transferred to Eskişehirspor, and was promptly loaned out to Ankaragücü and Kastamonuspor before returning to their first team. He transferred to Alanyaspor in 2018, and was with the club until January 2021. On 25 January 2021, he transferred to Denizlispor.

== International career ==
Ayaroğlu is a youth international for Turkey, having represented the Turkey U18s, U19s, and U20s.
