= Emrullah Şalk =

Turkish footballer

Personal information
- Date of birth: 28 July 1987 (age 39)
- Place of birth: Fatih, Turkey
- Height: 1.89 m (6 ft 2 in)
- Position: Goalkeeper

Youth career
- 2000–2003: Rami
- 2003–2007: Eyüpspor

Senior career*
Years	Team	Apps	(Gls)
2007–2008	Zeytinburnuspor	14	(0)
2008–2010	Çaykur Rizespor	3	(0)
2010–2011	Samsunspor	0	(0)
2010–2011	→ Eyüpspor (loan)	13	(0)
2011–2012	Eyüpspor	13	(0)
2012	Kayseri Erciyesspor	1	(0)
2012–2013	Konyaspor	0	(0)
2013–2015	Balıkesirspor	32	(0)
2015–2017	Adana Demirspor	25	(0)
2017–2018	Manisaspor	10	(0)
2018–2019	Konyaspor	0	(0)
2019	Gençlerbirliği	14	(0)
2019	Adana Demirspor	5	(0)
2020	Bursaspor	1	(0)
2020–2023	Eyüpspor	50	(0)
- * Club domestic league appearances and goals as of 12 June 2023

Emrullah Şalk (born 28 July 1987) is a Turkish former professional footballer who played as a goalkeeper.

== Professional career ==
Emrullah spent the majority of his career as a reserve goalkeeper for Turkish teams in the second divisions. Emrullah made his professional debut for Balıkesirspor in a 2-0 Süper Lig win over Konyaspor on 13 September 2013.
