= Yalçın Koşukavak =

Turkish footballer and coach

Personal information
- Date of birth: 14 October 1972 (age 54)
- Place of birth: İzmir, Turkey
- Position: Goalkeeper

Team information
- Current team: Muğlaspor (head coach)

Youth career
- 1992–1993: Altay

Senior career*
Years	Team	Apps	(Gls)
1993–1997	Yeni Turgutluspor	55	(0)
1998–1999	Batman Petrolspor	14	(0)
1999–2000	Şanlıurfaspor	5	(0)
2000–2003	Boluspor	4	(0)
2003–2004	Yeni Turgutluspor	23	(0)
2004–2006	Altınordu	0	(0)
Total		110	(0)

Managerial career
- 2007–2008: Göztepe (interim)
- 2013: Karacabey Birlikspor
- 2015: Altay
- 2015–2018: İstanbulspor
- 2018: Gaziantep
- 2019: Bursaspor
- 2020: Altay
- 2020–2021: Denizlispor
- 2021: Kayserispor
- 2023: Manisa
- 2023–2024: Boluspor
- 2024: Iğdır
- 2025: Boluspor
- 2025–2026: Keçiörengücü
- 2026–: Muğlaspor
- * Club domestic league appearances and goals

Yalçın Koşukavak (born 14 October 1972) is a Turkish association football manager and a former player who is the manager of TFF 1. Lig club Muğlaspor. During his playing career he played as a goalkeeper.

== Career ==
Koşukavak is a youth product of Altay, and spent his career as an semi-pro footballer with stints at Yeni Turgutluspor, Batman Petrolspor, Şanlıurfaspor, and Altınordu.

After retiring, he went into football management. He was appointed the interim manager with Göztepe, and had stints with various clubs in the Turkish semi-pro divisions. He managed Karacabey Birlikspor, Altay, İstanbulspor, and Gaziantep before managing, and Denizlispor and Kayserispor in the Süper Lig in 2020 and 2021 respectively.
