= Mustafa Dalcı =

Turkish footballer and coach

Personal information
- Date of birth: 1 July 1973 (age 53)
- Place of birth: Sivas, Turkey
- Position: Defender

Team information
- Current team: Eyüpspor (head coach)

Senior career*
Years	Team	Apps	(Gls)
1994–1995	Kasımpaşa	13	(0)
1995–1997	Fenerbahçe	0	(0)
1995–1997	→ Küçükköyspor (loan)	18	(1)
1997	Çanspor	3	(0)
1997	Rumelikavağı		
1997–2004	Gazi Mahallesispor		

Managerial career
- 2008–2009: Bayrampaşa
- 2011: Küçükçekmece
- 2012–2015: İstanbulspor
- 2016–2017: Kahramanmaraşspor
- 2017–2019: Mamak
- 2019: Ankaraspor
- 2020: Ankaragücü
- 2020: Zonguldak Kömürspor
- 2020–2021: Ankaragücü (interim)
- 2021–2022: Ankaragücü
- 2022–2023: Gençlerbirliği
- 2023–2024: Manisa
- 2024–2025: Adana Demirspor
- 2025: Sakaryaspor
- 2025: Ankaragücü
- 2025–2026: Manisa
- 2026: Sakaryaspor
- 2026–: Eyüpspor
- * Club domestic league appearances and goals

Mustafa Dalcı (born 1 July 1973) is a Turkish association football manager and a former player who is the head coach of Süper Lig club Eyüpspor.

== Managerial career ==
After an unassuming career as an amateur footballer, Dalcı managed various amateur sides in Turkey. He managed Ankaraspor in the TFF First League in 2019, and had a stint as interim manager for Ankaragücü. Dalcı signed a contract with Ankaragücü in the Süper Lig for 1.5 years on 23 January 2021.

On 29 November 2024, he reached an agreement with Adana Demirspor. After the match against Çaykur Rizespor on 26 January 2025, Dalcı left Demirspor and reached an agreement with Sakaryaspor. After a short tenure with the team, he joined Ankaragücü on 11 February 2025.
