= 2019–20 Denizlispor season =

Denizlispor
2019–20 season
- Chairman: Ali Çetin
- Manager: Yücel İldiz (until 8 October 2019); Mehmet Özdilek (from 11 October 2019 to 16 February 2020); Bülent Uygun (from 21 February 2020 to 4 July 2020) Levent Kartop (caretaker)
- Stadium: Denizli Atatürk Stadium
- Süper Lig: 14th
- Turkish Cup: Round of 16
- Top goalscorer: League: Óscar Estupiñán (7); All: Óscar Estupiñán (14)
- Highest home attendance: 13,693 vs. Galatasaray (16 August 2019)
- Lowest home attendance: 4,761 vs. Kayserispor (15 February 2020)
Home colours	Away colours	Third colours

The 2019–20 season was the 53rd season of Denizlispor in existence and the club's 20th season in total and first season back in the Süper Lig in 9 years, after being promoted from the Turkish second division TFF First League previous season, becoming champions. In addition to the domestic league, Denizlispor participated in this season's edition of the Turkish Cup. The season covers the period from July 2019 to 30 June 2020.

== Transfers ==
=== In ===
No.	Pos.	Nat.	Name	Age	Moving from	Type	Transfer window	Ends	Transfer fee	Source
27	MF	(Turkey)	Emre Sağlık	21	Kızılcabölükspor	End of loan	Summer	2019	Free	
22	DF	(Romania)	Cristian Săpunaru	35	Kayserispor	End of contract	Summer	2020	Free	Denizlispor.org.tr
2	DF	(Portugal)	Tiago Lopes	30	Kayserispor	End of contract	Summer	2021	Free	Denizlispor.org.tr
25	GK	(Turkey)	Tolgahan Acar	33	Sivasspor	End of contract	Summer	2020	Free	
7	FW	(Colombia)	Hugo Rodallega	33	Trabzonspor	End of contract	Summer	2020	Free	
5	DF	(Turkey)	Mustafa Yumlu	31	Akhisarspor	End of contract	Summer	2020	Free	Denizlispor.org.tr
11	MF	(Turkey)	Sedat Şahintürk	23	Beşiktaş	Loan	Summer	2020	Free	Bjk.com.tr
9	FW	(Mali)	Hadi Sacko	25	(England) Leeds United	Transfer	Summer	2021	Free	Denizlispor.org.tr
61	DF	(Turkey)	Zeki Yavru	27	Akhisarspor	Transfer	Summer	2020	Free	
19	FW	(Colombia)	Óscar Estupiñán	22	(Portugal) Vitória Guimarães	Loan	Summer	2020	Free	Denizlispor.org.tr
27	DF	(Morocco)	Zakarya Bergdich	30	(Portugal) Belenenses	Transfer	Summer	2020	Free	Denizlispor.org.tr
8	MF	(Poland)	Radosław Murawski	25	(Italy) Palermo	End of contract	Summer	2020	Free	
77	FW	(The Gambia)	Modou Barrow	27	(England) Reading	Loan	Summer	2020	Free	Denizlispor.org.tr
70	FW	(Turkey)	Olcay Şahan	32	Trabzonspor	End of contract	Summer	2020	Free	Denizlispor.org.tr
90	MF	(Ghana)	Isaac Sackey	25	Alanyaspor	Loan	Summer	2020	Free	Denizlispor.org.tr
3	DF	(Turkey)	Muhammet Özkal	20	BB Bodrumspor	Transfer	Winter	2024	Free	Denizlispor.org.tr
23	MF	(Nigeria)	Ogenyi Onazi	27	Trabzonspor	Transfer	Winter	2020	Free	
60	DF	(Turkey)	Özgür Çek	29	Kasımpaşa	Transfer	Winter	2022	Free	
55	DF	(Tunisia)	Syam Ben Youssef	30	Kasımpaşa	Transfer	Winter	2020	Free	

=== Out ===
No.	Pos.	Nat.	Name	Age	Moving to	Type	Transfer window	Transfer fee	Source
3	DF	(Turkey)	Alperen Babacan	21	Akhisarspor	End of loan	Summer	Free	
42	DF	(Turkey)	Abdülkerim Bardakcı	24	Konyaspor	End of loan	Summer	Free	
99	FW	(Turkey)	Seddar Karaman	25	Konyaspor	End of loan	Summer	Free	
4	DF	(Turkey)	Taha Can Velioğlu	25	Manisa FK	End of contract	Summer	Free	
7	MF	(Turkey)	Ziya Alkurt	28	Kayserispor	End of contract	Summer	Free	Kayserispor.org.tr
27	DF	(Turkey)	Furkan Şeker	27	Hatayspor	End of contract	Summer	Free	Hatayspor.org.tr
6	DF	(Turkey)	Gökhan Süzen	32	Ümraniyespor	End of contract	Summer	Free	
5	MF	(Turkey)	Deniz Vural	31	Altay	End of contract	Summer	Free	Altay.org.tr
90	FW	(Nigeria)	Lanre Kehinde	25	(South Korea) Incheon United	Transfer	Summer	Free	Denizlispor.org.tr
45	GK	(Turkey)	Asil Kaan Güler	25	Vanspor FK	End of contract	Summer	Free	
34	MF	(Netherlands)	Bilal Ould-Chikh	22	(Netherlands) ADO Den Haag	End of contract	Summer	Free	
23	MF	(Turkey)	Burak Altıparmak	28	Bursaspor	Mutual agreement	Summer	Free	
71	MF	(Turkey)	Himmet Ertürk	25	Giresunspor	Mutual agreement	Summer	Free	
39	DF	(Turkey)	Kerem Can Akyüz	30	Bursaspor	Mutual agreement	Winter	Free	Bursaspor.org.tr
27	DF	(Turkey)	Emre Sağlık	22	Ağrı 1970 SK	Loan	Winter	Free	
17	FW	(Turkey)	Mehmet Akyüz	34	Adana Demirspor	Transfer	Winter	Free	Adanademirspor.org.tr
24	FW	(Turkey)	Burak Çalık	30	Samsunspor	Transfer	Winter	Free	Samsunspor.org.tr
22	DF	(Romania)	Cristian Săpunaru	35	Kayserispor	Mutual agreement	Winter	Free	Kayserispor.org.tr
4	DF	(Turkey)	Kadir Kurt	21	Amed	Loan	Winter	Free	
33	GK	(Poland)	Adam Stachowiak	33		Contract termination	Mid-season	Free	Denizlispor.org.tr

== First team squad ==
N	Pos.	Nat.	Name	Age	EU	Since	App	Goals	Ends	Transfer fee	Notes
1	GK	(Turkey)	Hüseyin Altıntaş	25	Non-EU	2017	7	0	2020	Free	
2	DF	(Portugal)	Tiago Lopes	31	EU	2019	25	0	2021	Free	
3	DF	(Turkey)	Muhammet Özkal	20	Non-EU	2020 (Winter)	4	1	2024	Free	
5	DF	(Turkey)	Mustafa Yumlu	32	Non-EU	2019	28	3	2020	Free	
6	MF	(Cameroon)	Marc Kibong Mbamba	31	Non-EU	2018	38	0	2020	Free	
7	FW	(Colombia)	Hugo Rodallega (Captain)	35	Non-EU	2019	32	6	2020	Free	
8	MF	(Poland)	Radosław Murawski	26	EU	2019	35	5	2020	Free	
9	FW	(Mali)	Hadi Sacko	26	EU	2019	32	4	2021	Free	Second nationality: French
10	MF	(Morocco)	Ismaïl Aissati	31	EU	2018 (Winter)	80	3	2021	€60K	Second nationality: Dutch
11	MF	(Turkey)	Sedat Şahintürk	24	Non-EU	2019	16	0	2020	Free	
15	DF	(Turkey)	Oğuz Yılmaz	27	Non-EU	2019 (Winter)	39	0	2020	Free	
19	FW	(Colombia)	Óscar Estupiñán	23	Non-EU	2019	33	14	2020	Free	
20	MF	(Turkey)	Recep Niyaz	24	Non-EU	2018	88	24	2021	Free	Originally from youth system
21	DF	(Morocco)	Zakarya Bergdich	31	EU	2019	23	0	2020	Free	Second nationality: French
23	MF	(Nigeria)	Ogenyi Onazi	27	Non-EU	2020 (Winter)	10	0	2020	Free	
25	GK	(Turkey)	Tolgahan Acar	34	Non-EU	2019	11	0	2020	Free	
55	DF	(Tunisia)	Syam Ben Youssef	31	EU	2020 (Winter)	4	0	2020	Free	Second nationality: French
60	DF	(Turkey)	Özgür Çek	29	Non-EU	2020 (Winter)	14	0	2022	Free	
61	DF	(Turkey)	Zeki Yavru	28	Non-EU	2019	33	0	2020	Free	
70	FW	(Turkey)	Olcay Şahan	33	EU	2019	30	1	2020	Free	Second nationality: German
77	FW	(The Gambia)	Modou Barrow	28	Non-EU	2019	24	3	2020	Free	
90	MF	(Ghana)	Isaac Sackey	26	Non-EU	2019	24	0	2020	Free	
Players sold or loaned out after the start of the season
4	DF	(Turkey)	Kadir Kurt	21	Non-EU	2019	5	0	2022	Youth system	
17	FW	(Turkey)	Mehmet Akyüz	34	Non-EU	2018 (Winter)	60	29	2020	Free	
22	DF	(Romania)	Cristian Săpunaru	35	EU	2019	15	0	2020	Free	
24	FW	(Turkey)	Burak Çalık	30	Non-EU	2018	40	12	2020	Free	
27	DF	(Turkey)	Emre Sağlık	22	Non-EU	2016	8	1	2020	Youth system	
33	GK	(Poland)	Adam Stachowiak	33	EU	2018	49	0	2020	Free	
39	DF	(Turkey)	Kerem Can Akyüz	30	Non-EU	2016	90	2	2020	Free	

- Last updated: 25 July 2020
- Source: Denizlispor.org.tr
- Ordered by squad number.

== Statistics ==
As of 25 July 2020

No.	PMF.	Nat.	Player	Süper Lig						Turkish Cup						Total					
No.	PMF.	Nat.	Player	Ap	G	A	Booked	(yellow card) (red card)	Sent off (straight red)	Ap	G	A	Booked	(yellow card) (red card)	Sent off (straight red)	Ap	G	A	Booked	(yellow card) (red card)	Sent off (straight red)
1	GK	(Turkey)	Hüseyin Altıntaş	3	-	-	2	-	-	2	-	-	-	-	-	5	-	-	2	-	-
2	DF	(Portugal)	Tiago Lopes	23	-	-	4	1	-	2	-	-	1	-	-	25	-	-	5	1	-
3	DF	(Turkey)	Muhammet Özkal	3	1	-	-	-	-	1	-	-	-	1	-	4	1	-	-	1	-
5	DF	(Turkey)	Mustafa Yumlu	29	3	-	6	-	-	2	-	-	1	-	-	31	3	-	7	-	-
6	MF	(Cameroon)	Marc Kibong Mbamba	12	-	2	1	-	-	4	-	-	-	-	-	16	-	2	1	-	-
7	FW	(Colombia)	Hugo Rodallega (captain)	31	6	1	3	-	-	1	-	-	-	-	-	32	6	1	3	-	-
8	MF	(Poland)	Radosław Murawski	32	4	1	8	-	-	3	1	-	-	-	-	35	5	1	8	-	-
9	FW	(Mali)	Hadi Sacko	28	3	-	2	-	-	4	1	1	-	-	-	32	4	1	2	-	-
10	MF	(Morocco)	Ismaïl Aissati	33	-	3	5	-	-	1	-	-	-	-	-	34	-	3	5	-	-
11	MF	(Turkey)	Sedat Şahintürk	10	-	-	-	-	-	6	-	-	1	-	-	16	-	-	1	-	-
15	DF	(Turkey)	Oğuz Yılmaz	27	-	-	5	-	-	2	-	-	-	-	-	29	-	-	5	-	-
16	MF	(Turkey)	Asım Aksungur	-	-	-	-	-	-	3	-	-	-	-	-	3	-	-	-	-	-
19	FW	(Colombia)	Óscar Estupiñán	28	7	-	2	-	-	5	7	-	1	-	-	33	14	-	3	-	-
20	MF	(Turkey)	Recep Niyaz	20	1	-	1	-	-	6	3	1	1	-	-	26	4	1	2	-	-
21	DF	(Morocco)	Zakarya Bergdich	22	-	2	6	-	-	1	-	-	-	-	-	23	-	2	6	-	-
23	MF	(Nigeria)	Ogenyi Onazi	9	-	1	3	-	-	1	-	-	-	-	-	10	-	1	3	-	-
25	GK	(Turkey)	Tolgahan Acar	5	-	-	1	-	-	6	-	-	1	-	-	11	-	-	2	-	-
44	FW	(Turkey)	Alihan Kalkan	-	-	-	-	-	-	1	-	-	-	-	-	1	-	-	-	-	-
55	DF	(Tunisia)	Syam Ben Youssef	4	-	-	-	-	-	-	-	-	-	-	-	4	-	-	-	-	-
60	DF	(Turkey)	Özgür Çek	14	-	-	2	-	-	-	-	-	-	-	-	14	-	-	2	-	-
61	DF	(Turkey)	Zeki Yavru	30	-	4	2	-	1	4	-	-	3	-	-	34	-	4	5	-	1
70	FW	(Turkey)	Olcay Şahan	26	1	2	2	-	-	4	-	-	1	-	-	30	1	2	3	-	-
72	DF	(Turkey)	Murathan Sütcü	-	-	-	-	-	-	2	-	-	1	-	-	2	-	-	1	-	-
77	FW	(The Gambia)	Modou Barrow	24	3	2	3	-	1	-	-	-	-	-	-	24	3	2	3	-	1
90	MF	(Ghana)	Isaac Sackey	20	-	-	5	-	-	4	-	-	-	-	-	24	-	-	5	-	-
4	DF	(Turkey)	Kadir Kurt	-	-	-	-	-	-	4	-	-	-	-	-	4	-	-	-	-	-
17	FW	(Turkey)	Mehmet Akyüz	7	-	-	-	-	-	4	2	2	-	-	-	11	2	2	-	-	-
22	DF	(Romania)	Cristian Săpunaru	14	-	-	3	-	-	1	-	-	-	-	-	15	-	-	3	-	-
24	FW	(Turkey)	Burak Çalık	3	-	-	1	-	-	4	2	1	-	-	-	7	2	1	1	-	-
27	DF	(Turkey)	Emre Sağlık	-	-	-	-	-	-	4	-	-	1	-	-	4	-	-	1	-	-
33	GK	(Poland)	Adam Stachowiak	26	-	-	2	-	-	-	-	-	-	-	-	26	-	-	2	-	-
39	DF	(Turkey)	Kerem Can Akyüz	-	-	-	-	-	-	2	-	-	-	-	-	2	-	-	-	-	-

== Pre-season and friendlies ==
Win Draw Loss

=== Pre-season ===
18 July 2019 Friendly	Denizlispor	3 – 1	Altay	Afyonkarahisar
17:00	Hugo Rodallega 14'; Burak Çalık 29'; Burak Altıparmak 71'		8' Leandro Kappel	Stadium: Zafer Stadium

26 July 2019 Friendly	Denizlispor	2 – 1	Eskişehirspor	Afyonkarahisar
18:30	Hugo Rodallega 16' (pen.), 45'		9' Jesse Sekidika	Stadium: Zafer Stadium

29 July 2019 Friendly	Denizlispor	2 – 2	Ümraniyespor	Afyonkarahisar
18:30	Burak Çalık 62'; Mehmet Akyüz 90'		41' Riad Nouri; 44' Bahadır Taşdelen	Stadium: Zafer Stadium

1 August 2019 Friendly	Denizlispor	0 - 0	Göztepe	Afyonkarahisar
17:00				Stadium: Zafer Stadium

9 August 2019 Friendly	Altay	3 – 1	Denizlispor	İzmir
19:30	Marco Paixão 45'; Andreas Tatos 55'; Leandro Kappel 89'		59' Sedat Şahintürk	Stadium: Tire Mustafa Kemal Atatürk Stadium

=== Mid-season ===
12 October 2019 Friendly	Denizlispor	3 – 1	Altınordu	Denizli
16:00	Burak Çalık 30', 45'; Sedat Şahintürk 52'		46' Anıl Koç	Stadium: Atatürk Stadium

10 January 2020 Friendly	Denizlispor	v	Balıkesirspor	Antalya
13:00				Stadium: Titanic Mardan Spor Kompleksi

== Competitions ==
=== Overview ===
Competition	First match	Last match	Starting round	Final position	Record							
Competition	First match	Last match	Starting round	Final position	Pld	W	D	L	GF	GA	GD	Win %
Süper Lig	16 August 2019	25 July 2020	Matchday 1	14th	34	9	8	17	31	48	−17	26.47
Turkish Cup	25 September 2019	23 January 2020	Third round	Round of 16	6	4	1	1	17	8	+9	66.67
Total					40	13	9	18	48	56	−8	32.50

Source: Competitions

=== Süper Lig ===
==== League table ====
Pos	Team	Pld	W	D	L	GF	GA	GD	Pts
12	Gençlerbirliği	34	9	9	16	39	56	−17	36 (Note: Head-to-head points: Gençlerbirliği 4, Konyaspor 1)
13	Konyaspor	34	8	12	14	36	52	−16	36
14	Denizlispor	34	9	8	17	31	48	−17	35 (Note: Head-to-head points: Denizlispor 4, Rizespor 1)
15	Rizespor	34	10	5	19	38	57	−19	35
16	Yeni Malatyaspor	34	8	8	18	44	51	−7	32 (Note: Head-to-head points: Yeni Malatyaspor 6, Kayserispor 5, Ankaragücü 5. Head-to-head goal difference: Yeni Malatyaspor +6, Kayserispor -3, Ankaragücü -3. Head-to-head goals scored: Yeni Malatyaspor 9, Kayserispor 4, Ankaragücü 3.)

Source: Süper Lig, Soccerway
Rules for classification: 1) Points; 2) Head-to-head points; 3) Head-to-head goal difference; 4) Head-to-head goals scored; 5) Goal difference; 6) Goals scored; 7) Play-off.

==== Results summary ====
Overall								Home						Away					
Pld	W	D	L	GF	GA	GD	Pts	W	D	L	GF	GA	GD	W	D	L	GF	GA	GD
34	9	8	17	31	48	−17	35	5	2	10	14	25	−11	4	6	7	17	23	−6

Last updated: 25 July 2020.
Source: TFF.org

Pld = Matches played; W = Matches won; D = Matches drawn; L = Matches lost; GF = Goals for; GA = Goals against; GD = Goal difference; Pts = Points

==== Results by round ====
Round	1	2	3	4	5	6	7	8	9	10	11	12	13	14	15	16	17	18	19	20	21	22	23	24	25	26	27	28	29	30	31	32	33	34
Ground	H	A	A	H	A	H	A	H	A	H	A	H	A	H	A	H	A	A	H	H	A	H	A	H	A	H	A	H	A	H	A	H	A	H
Result	W	W	D	L	D	L	L	L	W	L	L	W	W	D	W	L	D	L	L	D	D	L	L	W	D	W	L	L	D	L	L	W	L	L
Position	4	3	3	4	5	9	13	14	12	13	14	11	9	10	9	11	11	12	12	12	11	12	13	10	10	10	11	13	12	13	14	13	14	14

Updated to match(es) played on 25 July 2020. Source: TFF.org
A = Away; H = Home; W = Win; D = Draw; L = Loss

==== Matches ====
Win Draw Loss

16 August 2019 1	Denizlispor	2 – 0	Galatasaray	Denizli
20:30 TRT (UTC+3)	Oğuz Yılmaz (yellow card) 26'; Tiago Lopes (yellow card) 28'; Zeki Yavru (yellow card) 45'; Recep Niyaz 75'; Cristian Săpunaru (yellow card) 90'; Hugo Rodallega 90'	Report	(yellow card) 28' Ryan Babel; (yellow card) 34' (yellow-red card) 43' Marcão; (yellow card) 69' Mariano; (yellow card) 77' Younès Belhanda	Stadium: Atatürk Stadium; Attendance: 13,693; Referee: Abdulkadir Bitigen; Assistant referees: Süleyman Özay, Mutafa Savranlar; Fourth official: Atilla Karaoğlan

25 August 2019 2	Antalyaspor	0 – 2	Denizlispor	Antalya
21:45 TRT (UTC+3)	Ufuk Akyol (yellow card) 81'	Report	37' (o.g.) Bahadır Öztürk; (yellow card) 44' Zeki Yavru; (yellow card) 52' Modou Barrow; 67' Modou Barrow; (yellow card) 81' Ismaïl Aissati	Stadium: Antalya Stadium; Attendance: 10,675; Referee: Volkan Bayarslan; Assistant referees: Asım Yusuf Öz, Candaş Elbil; Fourth official: Yasin Kol

31 August 2019 3	Göztepe	0 – 0	Denizlispor	İzmir
21:45 TRT (UTC+3)	Titi (yellow card) 19'; André Castro (yellow card) 66'; Eren Derdiyok (yellow card) 85'	Report	(yellow card) 10' Zakarya Bergdich; (yellow card) 38' (yellow-red card) 73' Tiago Lopes; (yellow card) 90' Adam Stachowiak	Stadium: Doğanlar Stadium; Attendance: 7,387; Referee: Suat Arslanboğa; Assistant referees: Mehmet Cem Satman, Mehmet Kısal; Fourth official: İlker Yasin Avcı

15 September 2019 4	Denizlispor	0 – 1	Konyaspor	Denizli
20:00 TRT (UTC+3)	Isaac Sackey (yellow card) 19'; Zakarya Bergdich (yellow card) 33'; Hugo Rodallega (yellow card) 72'; Radosław Murawski (yellow card) 73'	Report	(yellow card) 41' Ali Turan; 54' Farouk Miya; (yellow card) 80' Deni Milošević	Stadium: Atatürk Stadium; Attendance: 10,272; Referee: Ali Şansalan; Assistant referees: İsmail Şencan, Murat Engin Gözütok; Fourth official: Selim Özen

21 September 2019 5	Kayserispor	1 – 1	Denizlispor	Kayseri
17:30 TRT (UTC+3)	Pedro Henrique Konzen 13'; Yasir Subaşı (yellow card) 21'; Emmanuel Adebayor (yellow card) 39'	Report	(yellow card) 45' Cristian Săpunaru; 74' Radosław Murawski	Stadium: Kadir Has Stadium; Attendance: 8,782; Referee: Hüseyin Göçek; Assistant referees: Alpaslan Dedeş, Erdem Bayık; Fourth official: Erkan Engin

28 September 2019 6	Denizlispor	0 – 1	Kasımpaşa	Denizli
15:00 TRT (UTC+3)		Report	67' Haris Hajradinović; (yellow card) 79' Abdul Khalili; (yellow card) 90' Fatih Öztürk	Stadium: Atatürk Stadium; Attendance: 8,090; Referee: Tugay Kağan Numanoğlu; Assistant referees: Mehmet Salih Mazlum, Deniz Caner Özaral; Fourth official: Hüseyin Gökberk Arslan

4 October 2019 7	Yeni Malatyaspor	5 – 1	Denizlispor	Malatya
20:30 TRT (UTC+3)	Adis Jahović 28' (pen.), 61' (pen.), 69', 90'; Mitchell Donald 34'; Sakıb Aytaç (yellow card) 45'; Ghailene Chaalali (yellow card) 79'	Report	(yellow card) 26' Oğuz Yılmaz; (yellow card) 27' Cristian Săpunaru; (yellow card) 28' Tiago Lopes; (yellow card) 61' Radosław Murawski; (yellow card) 64' Olcay Şahan; 65' Hugo Rodallega; (yellow card) 76' Adam Stachowiak	Stadium: Yeni Malatya Stadium; Attendance: 6,703; Referee: Bülent Birincioğlu; Assistant referees: İlker Takpak, Abdullah Bora Özkara; Fourth official: Mustaya Aydın

20 October 2019 8	Denizlispor	1 – 2	Fenerbahçe	Denizli
19:00 TRT (UTC+3)	Isaac Sackey (yellow card) 8'; Ismaïl Aissati (yellow card) 45'; Óscar Estupiñán 73'	Report	39' Tolga Ciğerci; 62' Vedat Muriqi	Stadium: Atatürk Stadium; Attendance: 13,352; Referee: Fırat Aydınus; Assistant referees: Aleks Taşçıoğlu, Erdem Bayık; Fourth official: Onur Öztoprak

27 October 2019 9	Gençlerbirliği	0 – 2	Denizlispor	Ankara
16:30 TRT (UTC+3)	Giovanni Sio (yellow card) 16'	Report	34' Olcay Şahan; (yellow card) 61' Mustafa Yumlu; (yellow card) 71' Cristian Săpunaru; 90' (pen.) Radosław Murawski	Stadium: Eryaman Stadium; Attendance: 2,868; Referee: Halis Özkahya; Assistant referees: Ali Saygın Ögel, Bilal Gölen; Fourth official: Erdem Temel

3 November 2019 10	Denizlispor	0 – 2	Sivasspor	Denizli
14:00 TRT (UTC+3)	Tiago Lopes (yellow card) 41'; Radosław Murawski (yellow card) 45'; Mustafa Yumlu (yellow card) 80'; Tolgahan Acar (yellow card) 80'	Report	(yellow card) 23' Marcelo Goiano; 41' Hakan Arslan; (yellow card) 66' Uğur Çiftçi; (yellow card) 85' Hakan Arslan; 90' Arouna Koné	Stadium: Atatürk Stadium; Attendance: 7,634; Referee: Zorbay Küçük; Assistant referees: Hakan Yemişken, İbrahim Bozbey; Fourth official: Veli Karakaya

10 November 2019 11	Beşiktaş	1 – 0	Denizlispor	Istanbul
19:00 TRT (UTC+3)	Caner Erkin (yellow card) 18'; Georges-Kévin Nkoudou 70'; Gökhan Gönül (yellow card) 83'	Report	(yellow card) 18' Modou Barrow; (yellow card) 66' Isaac Sackey	Stadium: Vodafone Park; Attendance: 26,220; Referee: Özgür Yankaya; Assistant referees: Mehmet Metin, Mehmet Kısal; Fourth official: Ramazan Keleş

23 November 2019 12	Denizlispor	2 – 0	Çaykur Rizespor	Denizli
15:00 TRT (UTC+3)	Burak Çalık (yellow card) 11'; Radosław Murawski (yellow card) 41'; Zakarya Bergdich (yellow card) 70'; Óscar Estupiñán 86'; Radosław Murawski 90' (pen.)	Report	(yellow card) 29' Abdullah Durak; (yellow card) 69' Yan Sasse; (yellow card) 78' Marko Šćepović	Stadium: Atatürk Stadium; Attendance: 5,672; Referee: Halil Umut Meler; Assistant referees: İlker Takpak, Murat Ergin Gözütok; Fourth official: Burak Pakkan

1 December 2019 13	Gaziantep	1 – 2	Denizlispor	Gaziantep
14:00 TRT (UTC+3)	Furkan Soyalp (yellow card) 19'; Olarenwaju Kayode 54'; Oğuz Ceylan (yellow card) 83'; Raman Chibsah (yellow card) 90'	Report	(yellow card) 15' (goal) 58', 85' Hadi Sacko; (yellow card) 65' Ismaïl Aissati; (yellow card) 75' Mustafa Yumlu; (yellow card) 78' Zakarya Bergdich; (yellow card) 83' Modou Barrow	Stadium: Gaziantep Stadium; Attendance: 5,127; Referee: Atilla Karaoğlan; Assistant referees: İsmail Şencan, Samet Çiçek; Fourth official: Tarık Güldal

8 December 2019 14	Denizlispor	1 – 1	İstanbul Başakşehir	Denizli
16:30 TRT (UTC+3)	Isaac Sackey (yellow card) 27'; Radosław Murawski (yellow card) 43'; Zeki Yavru (yellow card) 44'; Modou Barrow 60'	Report	54' Edin Višća; (yellow card) 85' Danijel Aleksić	Stadium: Atatürk Stadium; Attendance: 9,929; Referee: Alper Ulusoy; Assistant referees: Volkan Ahmet Narinç, İbrahim Bozbey; Fourth official: Levent Balcı

16 December 2019 15	Trabzonspor	1 – 2	Denizlispor	Trabzon
20:00 TRT (UTC+3)	Oğuz Yılmaz 21' (o.g.)	Report	(yellow card) 56' Mustafa Yumlu; 59', 82' Hugo Rodallega	Stadium: Medical Park Stadium; Attendance: 27,899; Referee: Halis Özkahya; Assistant referees: Aleks Tasçıoğlı, Süleyman Özay; Fourth official: Murat Erdoğan

23 December 2019 16	Denizlispor	1 – 5	Alanyaspor	Denizli
20:00 TRT (UTC+3)	Tiago Lopes (yellow card) 67'; Óscar Estupiñán 83'	Report	(yellow card) 27' Ceyhun Gülselam; 35', 42' Welinton; 43' Djalma Campos; 78' Papiss Cisse; 86' Onur Bulut; (yellow card) 90' Efecan Karaca	Stadium: Atatürk Stadium; Attendance: 6,542; Referee: Hüseyin Göçek; Assistant referees: Mehmet Metin, Yusuf Bozdoğan; Fourth official: Selim Özen

28 December 2019 17	MKE Ankaragücü	2 – 2	Denizlispor	Ankara
15:00 TRT (UTC+3)	Alihan Kubalas (yellow card) 27'; Dever Orgill (yellow card) 44'; Óscar Scarione 66', 84'	Report	(red card) 10' Modou Barrow; 22' Mustafa Yumlu; 45' Hugo Rodallega; (yellow card) 81' Radosław Murawski	Stadium: Eryaman Stadium; Attendance: 8,493; Referee: Arda Kardeşler; Assistant referees: Candaş Elbil, Bilal Gölen; Fourth official: Yakup Özhan

19 January 2020 18	Galatasaray	2 – 1	Denizlispor	Istanbul
16:00 TRT (UTC+3)	Marcão (yellow card) 4'; Emre Akbaba 26'; Radamel Falcao 57'	Report	(yellow card) 29' Ogenyi Onazi; (yellow card) 40' Radosław Murawski; 64' Muhammet Özkal; (yellow card) 87' Hugo Rodallega; (yellow card) 90' Hadi Sacko	Stadium: Türk Telekom Stadium; Attendance: 32,702; Referee: Yaşar Kemal Uğurlu; Assistant referees: Erdinç Sezertam, Cevdet Kömürcüoğlu; Fourth official: Mustafa İlker Coşkun

26 January 2020 19	Denizlispor	0 – 3	Antalyaspor	Denizli
13:30 TRT (UTC+3)	Ogenyi Onazi (yellow card) 12'; Oğuz Yılmaz (yellow card) 87'	Report	(yellow card) 3' Bünyamin Balcı; (yellow card) 18' Paul Mukairu; 26' Adis Jahović; 40' Paul Mukairu; 57' Gustavo Blanco Leschuk	Stadium: Atatürk Stadium; Attendance: 8,501; Referee: Halil Umut Meler; Assistant referees: Bahtiyar Birinci, İbrahim Bozbey; Fourth official: Ferhan Kestanlıoğlu

3 February 2020 20	Denizlispor	1 – 1	Göztepe	Denizli
20:00 TRT (UTC+3)	Ismaïl Aissati (yellow card) 49'; Mustafa Yumlu (yellow card) 64'; Óscar Estupiñán 86'; Hüseyin Altıntaş (yellow card) 90'	Report	9' Serdar Gürler; (yellow card) 39' Lamine Gassama; (yellow card) 76' Soner Aydoğdu; (yellow card) 90' Beto	Stadium: Atatürk Stadium; Attendance: 8,986; Referee: Mustafa Öğretmenoğlu; Assistant referees: Samet Çavuş, Deniz Cafer Özkaral; Fourth official: Veli Karakaya

8 February 2020 21	Konyaspor	0 – 0	Denizlispor	Konya
14:00 TRT (UTC+3)	Nejc Skubic (yellow card) 30'	Report	(yellow card) 76' Olcay Şahan	Stadium: Büyükşehir Belediye Stadium; Attendance: 8,511; Referee: Volkan Bayarslan; Assistant referees: Özgür Ertem, Mehmet Salih Mazlum; Fourth official: Sinan Dereci

15 February 2020 22	Denizlispor	0 – 1	Kayserispor	Denizli
14:00 TRT (UTC+3)		Report	69' Cristian Săpunaru	Stadium: Atatürk Stadium; Attendance: 4,761; Referee: Özgür Yankaya; Assistant referees: Mehmet Metin, İlker Takpak; Fourth official: Mustafa Aydın

24 February 2020 23	Kasımpaşa	2 – 0	Denizlispor	Istanbul
20:00 TRT (UTC+3)	Tomáš Břečka 22'; Yassine Meriah (yellow card) 26'; Mickaël Tirpan (yellow card) 36'; Haris Hajradinović 83'	Report	(yellow card) 75' Isaac Sackey	Stadium: Recep Tayyip Erdoğan Stadium; Attendance: 1,625; Referee: Atilla Karaoğlan; Assistant referees: Mehmet Cem Hanoğlu, İbrahim Bozbey; Fourth official: Muhammet Ali Metoğlu

1 March 2020 24	Denizlispor	2 – 0	Yeni Malatyaspor	Denizli
13:30 TRT (UTC+3)	Mustafa Yumlu 34'; Modou Barrow 75'	Report	(yellow card) 18' Robin Yalçın; (yellow card) 38' Arturo Mina; (red card) 45+1' Teenage Hadebe; (yellow card) 83' Youssouf Ndayishimiy; (yellow card) 90+3' Murat Yıldırım	Stadium: Atatürk Stadium; Attendance: 5,907; Referee: Koray Gençerler; Assistant referees: Serkan Ok, Bilal Gölen; Fourth official: Adem Sarıtaş

7 March 2020 25	Fenerbahçe	2 – 2	Denizlispor	Istanbul
20:00 TRT (UTC+3)	Ozan Tufan 22' (yellow card) 76'; Tolgay Arslan (yellow card) 36' (yellow-red card) 43'; Hasan Ali Kaldırım (yellow card) 54'; Serdar Aziz (yellow card) 77' (goal) 90'; Tolga Ciğerci (yellow card) 86'; Altay Bayındır (yellow card) 90'	Report	45' (pen.) (yellow card) 86' Radosław Murawski; (yellow card) 53' Óscar Estupiñán; 75' Mustafa Yumlu; (yellow card) 87' Özgür Çek; (yellow card) 90' Recep Niyaz	Stadium: Şükrü Saracoğlu Stadium; Attendance: 24,718; Referee: Zorbay Küçük; Assistant referees: Mehmet Cem Satman, İlker Takpak; Fourth official: Direnç Tonusluoğlu

14 March 2020 26	Denizlispor	1 – 0	Gençlerbirliği	Denizli
14:00 TRT (UTC+3)	Ogenyi Onazi (yellow card) 15'; Hugo Rodallega 54'	Report	(yellow card) 58' Fabrício Baiano; (yellow card) 83' Ahmet Oğuz	Stadium: Atatürk Stadium; Attendance: 0 (Note: It was concluded that matches would be played behind closed doors in the stadiums in Süper Lig from Week 26 due to the coronavirus pandemic.); Referee: Cüneyt Çakır; Assistant referees: Bahattin Duran, Tarık Ongun; Fourth official: İlker Yasin Avcı

15 June 2020 27	Sivasspor	1 – 0	Denizlispor	Sivas
21:00 TRT (UTC+3)	Emre Kılınç (yellow card) 24'; Mustapha Yatabaré 45'; Fatih Aksoy (yellow card) 55'; Caner Osmanpaşa (yellow card) 77'	Report	(red card) 44' Zeki Yavru; (yellow card) 45' Hugo Rodallega; (yellow card) 90' Zakarya Bergdich	Stadium: New 4 Eylül Stadium; Attendance: 0 Referee: Abdulkadir Bitigen; Assistant referees: Kemal Yılmaz, Mustafa Savranlar; Fourth official: Yakup Özhan

20 June 2020 28	Denizlispor	1 – 5	Beşiktaş	Denizli
21:00 TRT (UTC+3)	Kibong Mbamba (yellow card) 45'; Óscar Estupiñán 53'; Oğuz Yılmaz (yellow card) 59'	Report	10' Burak Yılmaz; 60' Gökhan Gönül; 67' Georges-Kévin Nkoudou; 75' Adem Ljajić; 78' Abdoulay Diaby	Stadium: Atatürk Stadium; Attendance: 0 Referee: Mete Kalkavan; Assistant referees: Ceyhun Sesigüzel, Esat Sancaktar; Fourth official: Sarper Barış Saka

28 June 2020 29	Çaykur Rizespor	2 – 2	Denizlispor	Rize
18:30 TRT (UTC+3)	Mykola Morozyuk (yellow card) 16'; Milan Škoda 40'; Tunay Torun (yellow card) 67'; Fernando Boldrin (yellow card) 71'	Report	(yellow card) 4' Özgür Çek; 20' Óscar Estupiñán; 30' (o.g.) Ivanildo Fernandes	Stadium: Çaykur Didi Stadium; Attendance: 0 Referee: Cüneyt Çakır; Assistant referees: Bahattin Duran, Tarık Ongun; Fourth official: Mert Güzenge

3 July 2020 30	Denizlispor	0 – 1	Gaziantep	Denizli
21:00 TRT (UTC+3)	Mustafa Yumlu (yellow card) 17'; Oğuz Yılmaz (yellow card) 53'	Report	24' Güray Vural; (yellow card) 78' Kenan Özer	Stadium: Atatürk Stadium; Attendance: 0 Referee: Özgür Yankaya; Assistant referees: Mehmet Salih Mazlum, Bilal Gölen; Fourth official: Murat Erdoğan

7 July 2020 31	İstanbul Başakşehir	2 – 0	Denizlispor	Istanbul
21:00 TRT (UTC+3)	Gaël Clichy (yellow card) 29'; Carlos Ponck (yellow card) 42'; Enzo Crivelli 65'; Edin Višća 78' (pen.); Mehmet Topal (yellow card) 83'	Report	(yellow card) 36' Zakarya Bergdich	Stadium: Başakşehir Fatih Terim Stadium; Attendance: 0 Referee: Abdulkadir Bitigen; Assistant referees: Kemal Yılmaz, İbrahim Çağlar Uyarcan; Fourth official: Sarper Barış Saka

12 July 2020 32	Denizlispor	2 – 1	Trabzonspor	Denizli
21:00 TRT (UTC+3)	Hadi Sacko 46'; Óscar Estupiñán 84'	Report	14', (yellow card) 90' Caleb Ekuban; (yellow card) 63' José Sosa; (yellow card) 90' Kamil Çörekçi	Stadium: Atatürk Stadium; Attendance: 0 Referee: Yaşar Kemal Uğurlu; Assistant referees: Erdinç Sezertam, Serkan Çimen; Fourth official: Kadir Sağlam

18 July 2020 33	Alanyaspor	1 – 0	Denizlispor	Alanya, Antalya
21:00 TRT (UTC+3)	Steven Caulker (yellow card) 55'; Onur Bulut 90+6'	Report	(yellow card) 90+4' Óscar Estupiñán	Stadium: Bahçeşehir Okulları Stadium; Attendance: 0 Referee: Fırat Aydınus; Assistant referees: Aleks Taşcıoğlu, Erdem Bayık; Fourth official: Abudllah Buğra Taşkınsoy

25 July 2020 34	Denizlispor	0 – 1	MKE Ankaragücü	Denizli
21:00 TRT (UTC+3)	Ismaïl Aissati (yellow card) 84'; Hüseyin Altıntaş (yellow card) 90+3'	Report	(yellow card) 70' Ender Aygören; 90+5' İlhan Parlak	Stadium: Atatürk Stadium; Attendance: 0 Referee: Alper Ulusoy; Assistant referees: Cevdet Kömürcüoğlu, İbrahim Çağlar Uyarcan; Fourth official: Yiğit Arslan

=== Turkish Cup ===
==== Third round ====
25 September 2019 Third round	Hacettepe	0 – 4	Denizlispor	Ankara
13:00 TRT (UTC+3)	Yağız Bolat (yellow card) 63'; Metehan Mert (yellow card) 69'	Report	8', 72' (yellow card) 10' Óscar Estupiñán; (yellow card) 45' Zeki Yavru; 51' Recep Niyaz; (yellow card) 64' Tolgahan Acar; 78' (o.g.) Ali Eren Karadağ; (yellow card) 86' Sedat Şahintürk	Stadium: Etimesgut Belediyesi Atatürk Stadium; Referee: Ramazan Keleş; Assistant referees: Serdar Diyadin, Muhammet Yumak; Fourth official: Şeref Taştan

==== Fourth round ====
31 October 2019 Fourth round	Denizlispor	4 – 1	İçel İdman Yurdu	Denizli
20:30 TRT (UTC+3)	Hadi Sacko 7'; Burak Çalık 8'; Mehmet Akyüz 74'; Emre Sağlık (yellow card) 78'; Recep Niyaz 90'	Report	21' Mustafa Özkaya; (yellow card) 82' Süleyman Öztürk	Stadium: Atatürk Stadium; Referee: Alper Çetin; Assistant referees: Cem Özbay, Hakan Karabalcık; Fourth official: Sait Tuzcu

==== Fifth round ====
5 December 2019 First leg	Altınordu	3 – 5	Denizlispor	İzmir
16:330 TRT (UTC+3)	Yusuf Arslan (yellow card) 16'; Egehan Gök 45'; Ersel Aslıyüksek 52'; Berkay Samancı (yellow card) 63'; Ali Mert Aydın (yellow card) 86'; Fatih Aktay 90'	Report	33', 68' Óscar Estupiñán; 50' Mehmet Akyüz; 59' Burak Çalık; 64' (pen.) Radosław Murawski; (yellow card) 90' Murathan Sütcü	Stadium: Tire Mustafa Kemal Atatürk Stadium; Referee: Burak Pakkan; Assistant referees: Murat Altan, Mehmet Emin Tuğral; Fourth official: Hakan Ülker

19 December 2019 Second leg	Denizlispor	2 – 2 (7–5 agg.)	Altınordu	Denizli
14:30 TRT (UTC+3)	Óscar Estupiñán 6', 30'	Report	52', 79' Kemal Rüzgar	Stadium: Atatürk Stadium; Referee: Cihan Aydın; Assistant referees: Ata Yıldırım, Hakan Karabalcık; Fourth official: Süleyman Soyutürk

==== Round of 16 ====
16 January 2020 First leg	Trabzonspor	2 – 0	Denizlispor	Trabzon
20:30 TRT (UTC+3)	Kamil Çörekçi (yellow card) 15'; José Sosa 22'; Abdülkadir Parmak (yellow card) 31'; Anthony Nwakaeme 80'	Report	(yellow card) 45' Zeki Yavru; (yellow card) 50' Mustafa Yumlu; (yellow card) 67' Recep Niyaz; (yellow card) 90' Tiago Lopes	Stadium: Medical Park Stadium; Referee: Suat Arslanboğa; Assistant referees: Alpaslan Dedeş, Erdem Bayık; Fourth official: Adem Cinek

23 January 2020 Second leg	Denizlispor	2 – 0 (a.e.t.) (2–4 p)	Trabzonspor	Denizli
17:00 TRT (UTC+3)	Óscar Estupiñán 14'; Zeki Yavru (yellow card) 21'; Recep Niyaz 23'; Olcay Şahan (yellow card) 105'; Muhammet Özkal (yellow card) 49' (yellow-red card) 120'	Report	(yellow card) 19' Abdülkadir Parmak; (yellow card) 59' Yusuf Sarı; (yellow card) 90' Doğan Erdoğan; (yellow card) 94' (yellow-red card) 95' Anthony Nwakaeme	Stadium: Atatürk Stadium; Referee: Ali Şansalan; Assistant referees: Kemal Yılmaz, Kerem Ersoy; Fourth official: Onur Özütoprak
	Penalties
	Radosław Murawski (penalty missed); Óscar Estupiñán (penalty scored); Recep Niyaz (penalty scored); Tiago Lopes (penalty missed)		(penalty scored) João Pereira; (penalty scored) José Sosa; (penalty scored) Badou Ndiaye; (penalty scored) Doğan Erdoğan
