= 2019–20 Sivasspor season =

Sivasspor
2019–20 season
- Chairman: Mecnun Otyakmaz
- Manager: Rıza Çalımbay
- Stadium: New Sivas 4 Eylül Stadium
- Süper Lig: 4th (UEFA Europa League)
- Turkish Cup: Quarter-final
- Top goalscorer: League: Mustapha Yatabaré (13); All: Mustapha Yatabaré (14)
Home colours	Away colours	Third colours

The 2019–20 season was Sivasspor's 53rd year in existence. In addition to the domestic league, Sivasspor participated in the Turkish Cup.

== Squad ==
As of 9 July 2020.

Note: Flags indicate national team as defined under FIFA eligibility rules; some limited exceptions apply. Players may hold more than one non-FIFA nationality.

No.	Pos.	Nation	Player
1	GK	TUR	Muammer Yıldırım
2	FW	CIV	Arouna Koné
3	DF	TUR	Uğur Çiftçi
4	DF	GAB	Aaron Appindangoyé
5	MF	GHA	Isaac Cofie
6	DF	ROU	Paul Papp
7	FW	BRA	Fernando Andrade (on loan from FC Porto)
8	MF	TUR	Mert Hakan Yandaş
9	FW	MLI	Mustapha Yatabaré
11	MF	GER	Erdoğan Yeşilyurt
14	DF	FRA	Samba Camara
17	MF	UKR	Serhiy Rybalka
19	MF	TUR	Yasin Öztekin
20	DF	TUR	Fatih Aksoy (on loan from Beşiktaş)

No.	Pos.	Nation	Player
22	MF	SRB	Armin Đerlek
23	MF	TUR	Furkan Sağman
25	MF	BRA	Claudemir
26	DF	TUR	Barış Yardımcı
29	GK	TUR	Ali Şaşal Vural
30	GK	MLI	Mamadou Samassa
32	FW	SRB	Petar Škuletić (on loan from Montpellier)
37	MF	TUR	Hakan Arslan
52	DF	TUR	Volkan Eğri
54	MF	TUR	Emre Kılınç
58	DF	TUR	Ziya Erdal
87	DF	BRA	Marcelo Goiano
88	DF	TUR	Caner Osmanpaşa
—	MF	TUR	Cem Özdemir

== Süper Lig ==
=== League table ===
Pos	Team	Pld	W	D	L	GF	GA	GD	Pts	Qualification or relegation
2	Trabzonspor (Note: Trabzonspor were banned for 1 season from all UEFA club competitions for either the 2020–21 or 2021–22 seasons by the UEFA Club Financial Control Body on 3 June 2020 due to breaches of the UEFA Financial Fair Play Regulations.)	34	18	11	5	76	42	+34	65	
3	Beşiktaş	34	19	5	10	59	40	+19	62	Qualification for the Champions League second qualifying round
4	Sivasspor	34	17	9	8	55	38	+17	60	Qualification for the Europa League group stage
5	Alanyaspor	34	16	9	9	61	37	+24	57	Qualification for the Europa League third qualifying round
6	Galatasaray	34	15	11	8	55	37	+18	56	Qualification for the Europa League second qualifying round

Source: Süper Lig, Soccerway
Rules for classification: 1) Points; 2) Head-to-head points; 3) Head-to-head goal difference; 4) Head-to-head goals scored; 5) Goal difference; 6) Goals scored; 7) Play-off.

=== Results summary ===
Overall								Home						Away					
Pld	W	D	L	GF	GA	GD	Pts	W	D	L	GF	GA	GD	W	D	L	GF	GA	GD
34	17	9	8	55	38	+17	60	11	4	2	27	12	+15	6	5	6	28	26	+2

Source: TFF

=== Results by round ===
Round	1	2	3	4	5	6	7	8	9	10	11	12	13	14	15	16	17	18	19	20	21	22	23	24	25	26	27	28	29	30	31	32	33	34
Ground	H	A	H	A	H	A	H	A	H	A	H	A	H	A	H	A	H	A	H	A	H	A	H	A	H	A	H	A	H	A	H	A	H	A
Result	W	L	D	D	W	D	W	L	W	W	W	W	W	W	W	D	W	W	D	L	D	L	W	W	D	L	W	D	L	D	L	W	W	L
Position	2	6	7	10	4	5	2	7	5	2	1	1	1	1	1	1	1	1	1	2	2	4	4	4	4	4	3	3	3	3	3	3	3	4

Updated to match(es) played on 26 July 2020. Source: TFF.org
A = Away; H = Home; W = Win; D = Draw; L = Loss

== Matches ==
August 17, 2019 1	Sivasspor	3–0	Beşiktaş	Sivas
21:45	Ziya Erdal (yellow card) 24'; Mert Hakan Yandaş 30' (yellow card) 44'; Mustapha Yatabaré 54'; Isaac Cofie (yellow card) 63'; Hakan Arslan (yellow card) 70'; Emre Kılınç 76'	Report	(yellow card) 45' Tyler Boyd; (yellow card) 45' Adem Ljajić; (yellow card) 65' Caner Erkin	Stadium: New Sivas 4 Eylül Stadium; Referee: Mustafa Öğretmenoğlu; Assistant referees: Ali Saygın Ögel, Samet Çavuş; Fourth official: Sarper Barış Saka; Fifth official: Koray Gençerler, İbrahim Çağlar Uyarcan

August 25, 2019 2	Çaykur Rizespor	2–1	Sivasspor	Rize
19:15	Braian Samudio 54' (pen.); Fernando Boldrin 58'; Oğulcan Çağlayan (yellow card) 81'; Joseph Larweh Attamah (yellow card) 90'	Report	(yellow card) 52' Aaron Appindangoyé; (yellow card) 65' Emre Kılınç; 79' Fernando	Stadium: Yeni Rize Şehir Stadium; Referee: Fırat Aydınus; Assistant referees: Aleks Taşçıoğlu, Erdem Bayık; Fourth official: Onur Özütoprak; Fifth official: Hüseyin Göçek, Kadir Sağlam

September 1, 2019 3	Sivasspor	1–1	Gazişehir Gaziantep	Sivas
19:15	Isaac Cofie (yellow card) 8'; Aaron Appindangoyé (yellow card) 57'; Emre Kılınç (yellow card) 61'; Arouna Koné 72'	Report	(yellow card) 30' Oğuz Ceylan; 35' (yellow card) 76' Patrick Twumasi; (yellow card) 70' Günay Güvenç; (yellow card) 90' Kenan Özer	Stadium: New Sivas 4 Eylül Stadium; Referee: Hüseyin Göçek; Assistant referees: Alpaslan Dedeş, Abdullah Bora Özkara; Fourth official: Oğuzhan Uğurlu; Fifth official: Bülent Birincioğlu, Serkan Olguncan

September 14, 2019 4	İstanbul Başakşehir	1–1	Sivasspor	Istanbul
17:00	Mahmut Tekdemir (yellow card) 22'; Edin Višća 55'; Demba Ba (yellow card) 62'	Report	39' Mustapha Yatabaré; (yellow card) 42' Emre Kılınç; (yellow card) 88' Uğur Çiftçi	Stadium: Başakşehir Fatih Terim Stadium; Referee: Arda Kardeşler; Assistant referees: Erdinç Sezertam, İbrahim Bozbey; Fourth official: Kutluhan Bilgiç; Fifth official: Koray Gençerler, Çağdaş Altay

September 23, 2019 5	Sivasspor	2–1	Trabzonspor	Sivas
20:00	Fernando 41' (yellow card) 77'; Erdoğan Yeşilyurt (yellow card) 81'; Mamadou Samassa (yellow card) 90'; Uğur Çiftçi 90'	Report	3' (yellow card) 55' Donis Avdijaj; (yellow card) 45' Gaston Campi; (yellow card) 55' Donis Avdijaj; (penalty missed) 80' Alexander Sørloth; (yellow card) 90' Koray Kılınç	Stadium: New Sivas 4 Eylül Stadium; Attendance: 10.821; Referee: Yaşar Kemal Uğurlu; Assistant referees: Cem Satman, Mustafa Sönmez; Fourth official: Cihan Aydın; Fifth official: Ali Şansalan, Cevdet Kömürcüoğlu

September 28, 2019 6	Alanyaspor	1–1	Sivasspor	Alanya, Antalya
17:30	Anastasios Bakasetas (yellow card) 15'; Juanfran (yellow card) 58'; Papiss Cissé 61'; Welinton (yellow card) 90'	Report	1' Fernando; (yellow card) 45' Uğur Çiftçi; (yellow card) 90' Mamadou Samassa; (yellow card) 90' Mustapha Yatabaré; (yellow card) 90' Ziya Erdal	Stadium: Bahçeşehir Okulları Stadium; Attendance: 4,902; Referee: Halil Umut Meler; Assistant referees: Cevdet Kömürcüoğlu, Ekrem Kan; Fourth official: Mustafa Aydın; Fifth official: Mete Kalkavan, Kerem Ersoy

October 6, 2019 7	Sivasspor	3–1	MKE Ankaragücü	Sivas
14:00	Mert Yandaş 26', 48'; Aaron Appindangoyé (yellow card) 44'; Uğur Çiftçi (yellow card) 54'; Erdoğan Yeşilyurt (yellow card) 79'; Marcelo Goiano (yellow card) 88'; Mustapha Yatabaré 90+2'	Report	15' Dever Orgill; (yellow card) 21' Hasan Kaya	Stadium: New Sivas 4 Eylül Stadium; Attendance: 7,841; Referee: Atilla Karaoğlan; Assistant referees: Özgür Ertem, Bilal Gölen; Fourth official: Serkan Önsal; Fifth official: Emre Malok, Murat Erdoğan

October 18, 2019 8	Galatasaray	3–2	Sivasspor	Istanbul
20:30	Florin Andone 22' (pen.) 42' (pen.) (yellow card) 62'; Christian Luyindama (yellow card) 23'; Ryan Babel 73' Ömer Bayram (yellow card) 77'; Yunus Akgün (yellow card) 83'	Report	(yellow card) 30' Fernando Andrade dos Santos; (yellow card) 31' Mustapha Yatabaré; (yellow card) 45' (yellow card) 48' (red card) Isaac Cofie; 69' Arouna Koné; 83' Erdoğan Yeşilyurt	Stadium: Türk Telekom Stadium; Attendance: 34,315; Referee: Ali Palabıyık; Assistant referees: Serkan Olguncan, Erdinç Sezertam; Fourth official: Caner Ak; Fifth official: Serkan Tokat, Kerem Ersoy

October 26, 2019 9	Sivasspor	2–1	Antalyaspor	Sivas
15:00	Emre Kılınç 51'; Mustapha Yatabaré (yellow card) 55' (goal) 76'; Hakan Arslan (yellow card) 73'; Mert Hakan Yandaş (yellow card) 90+4'	Report	(yellow card) 63' Hakan Özmert; 83' (pen.) Serdar Özkan	Stadium: New Sivas 4 Eylül Stadium; Attendance: 7,600; Referee: Alper Ulusoy; Assistant referees: Alpaslan Dedeş, Bahtiyar Birinci; Fourth official: Şeref Taştan; Fifth official: Arda Kardeşler, Yiğit Arslan

November 3, 2019 10	Denizlispor	0–2	Sivasspor	Denizli
14:00	Tiago Lopes (yellow card) 41'; Radosław Murawski (yellow card) 45'; Mustafa Yumlu (yellow card) 80'; Tolgahan Acar (yellow card) 80'	Report	(yellow card) 23' Marcelo Goiano; 41' Hakan Arslan; (yellow card) 66' Uğur Çiftçi; (yellow card) 85' Hakan Arslan; 90' Arouna Koné	Stadium: Atatürk Stadyumu; Attendance: 7,634; Referee: Zorbay Küçük; Assistant referees: Hakan Yemişken, İbrahim Bozbey; Fourth official: Veli Karakaya; Fifth official: Özgür Yankaya, Emre Malok

November 9, 2019 11	Sivasspor	2–0	Konyaspor	Sivas
17:30	Fatih Aksoy (yellow card) 52'; Emre Kılınç 80'; Hakan Arslan 89'	Report	(yellow card) 65' Amir Hadžiahmetović; (yellow card) 75' (yellow card) 78' (red card) Levan Shengelia; (yellow card) 87' Marin Aničić	Stadium: New Sivas 4 Eylül Stadium; Attendance: 10,161; Referee: Mete Kalkavan; Assistant referees: Ceyhun Sesigüzel, Esat Sancaktar; Fourth official: Bülent Birincioğlu; Fifth official: Koray Gençerler, Erkan Özdamar

November 24, 2019 12	Kayserispor	1–4	Sivasspor	Kayseri
14:00	Pedro Henrique Konzen 43'; Şamil Çinaz (yellow card) 61'; Pedro Henrique Konzen (yellow card) 70'	Report	23' Fernando; (yellow card) 61' Fatih Aksoy; 68' Emre Kılınç; 74' Erdoğan Yeşilyurt; 90+4' Erdoğan Yeşilyurt	Stadium: Kadir Has Şehir Stadyumu; Attendance: 11,073; Referee: Halis Özkahya; Assistant referees: Ali Saygın Ögel-Samet Çavuş; Fourth official: Bilal Köseoğlu

November 30, 2019 13	Sivasspor	2–0	Kasımpaşa	Sivas
15:00	Hakan Arslan 9'; Mustapha Yatabaré 17' (yellow card) 87'	Report	(yellow card) 10' Aytaç Kara; (yellow card) 19' Jorge Fernandes; (yellow card) 36' Bengali-Fodé Koita	Stadium: New Sivas 4 Eylül Stadium; Attendance: 9,956; Referee: Cüneyt Çakır; Assistant referees: Tarık Ongun, Alpaslan Dedeş; Fourth official: Mustafa Kürşad Filiz; Fifth official: Özgüç Türkalp, Çağdaş Altay

December 7, 2019 14	Yeni Malatyaspor	1–3	Sivasspor	Malatya
15:00	Guilherme Costa Marques 37' (yellow card) 87'; Issam Chebake (yellow card) 62'	Report	26' (yellow card) 51' Hakan Arslan; 30' Mert Hakan Yandaş; (yellow card) 45+1' Fernando; (yellow card) 51' Fatih Aksoy; 54' Emre Kılınç; (yellow card) 79' Erdoğan Yeşilyurt	Stadium: Malatya Arena; Attendance: 9,091; Referee: Ümit Öztürk; Assistant referees: Osman Gökhan Bilir, Kamil Çetin; Fourth official: Yalçın Taşkınfurat; Fifth official: Serkan Tokat, Serkan Olguncan

December 15, 2019 15	Sivasspor	3–1	Fenerbahçe	Sivas
16:30	Fernando 32'; Fatih Aksoy (yellow card) 42'; Emre Kılınç (yellow card) 55' (goal) 59'; Uğur Çiftçi (yellow card) 61'; Mert Hakan Yandaş (yellow card) 90'; Ziya Erdal 90'	Report	(yellow card) 5' Mauricio Isla; 85' Deniz Türüç; (red card) 90' Garry Rodrigues; (yellow card) 90' (yellow card) 90' (red card) Ozan Tufan	Stadium: New Sivas 4 Eylül Stadium; Attendance: 21,214; Referee: Ali Palabıyık; Assistant referees: Serkan Olguncan, Serkan Çimen; Fourth official: Kutluhan Bilgiç; Fifth official: Bahattin Şimşek, Cevdet Kömürcüoğlu

December 22, 2019 16	Gençlerbirliği	2–2	Sivasspor	Ankara
14:00	Bogdan Stancu 56' , (yellow card) MS'; Floyd Ayité 60'; Baiano (yellow card) 77'; Berat Özdemir (yellow card) 90+1'	Report	Marcelo Goiano (yellow card) 21'; Arouna Koné 23'; Caner Osmanpaşa (yellow card) 42'; Mustapha Yatabaré 90+6'	Stadium: Eryaman Stadium; Attendance: 9,630; Referee: Halis Özkahya; Assistant referees: Cevdet Kömürcüoğlu, Samet Çavuş; Fourth official: Burak Taşkınsoy; Fifth official: Koray Gençerler, Burak Şeker

December 29, 2019 17	Sivasspor	1–0	Göztepe	Sivas
14:00	Mert Hakan Yandaş (yellow card) 35'; Mustapha Yatabaré 66'	Report	(yellow card) 81' Deniz Kadah	Stadium: New Sivas 4 Eylül Stadium; Attendance: 12,961; Referee: Yaşar Kemal Uğurlu; Assistant referees: Mehmet Cem Satman, Mustafa Sönmez; Fourth official: Burak Pakkan; Fifth official: Özgür Yankaya, Serkan Olguncan

January 19, 2020 18	Beşiktaş	1–2	Sivasspor	Istanbul
19:00	Enzo Roco (yellow card) 5'; Adem Ljajić 33'; Mohamed Elneny (yellow card) 80'	Report	6' (yellow card) 78' Erdoğan Yeşilyurt; (yellow card) 32' Emre Kılınç; 44' Mustapha Yatabaré; (yellow card) 47' Marcelo Goiano; (yellow card) 61' Hakan Arslan; (yellow card) 80' Fatih Aksoy; (yellow card) 90+5' Yasin Öztekin	Stadium: Vodafone Park; Attendance: 28,902; Referee: Ali Şansalan; Assistant referees: Kemal Yılmaz, Kerem Ersoy; Fourth official: Alper Çetin; Fifth official: Abdulkadir Bitigen, Sarper Barış Saka

January 27, 2020 19	Sivasspor	1–1	Çaykur Rizespor	Sivas
20:00	Mert Hakan Yandaş (yellow card) 66'; Yasin Öztekin 90+3'	Report	(yellow card) 26' Milan Škoda; (yellow card) 33' Montassar Talbi; (yellow card) 55' Fernando Boldrin; 60' Denys Harmash; (yellow card) 85'Amedej Vetrih; (yellow card) 87' Gökhan Akkan	Stadium: New Sivas 4 Eylül Stadium; Attendance: 11,063; Referee: Abdulkadir Bitigen; Assistant referees: İbrahim Çağlar Uyarcan, Ali Saygın Önel; Fourth official: Mustafa Aydın; Fifth official: Ümit Öztürk, Yiğit Arslan

February 2, 2020 20	Gaziantep	5–1	Sivasspor	Gaziantep
16:00	Alexandru Maxim 4', 44'; Muhammet Demir 39'; Papy Djilobodji (yellow card) 40'; Olarenwaju Kayode (yellow card) 45+4'; Güray Vural (yellow card) 53'; Souleymane Diarra 78'; Kenan Özer 86'	Report	31' (yellow card) 88' Hakan Arslan; (yellow card) 44' Erdoğan Yeşilyurt; (yellow card) 46' Mert Hakan Yandaş; (yellow card) 60' Mustapha Yatabaré	Stadium: New Gaziantep Stadium; Attendance: 9,357; Referee: Arda Kardeşler; Assistant referees: Aleks Taşcıoğlu, Mehmet Metin; Fourth official: Adnan Deniz Kayatepe; Fifth official: Mert Güzenge, Mustafa Kürşad Filiz

February 9, 2020 21	Sivasspor	1–1	İstanbul Başakşehir	Sivas
16:00	Mustapha Yatabaré 80'	Report	66' Demba Ba; (yellow card) 74' Gaël Clichy; (yellow card) 78' Edin Višća; (yellow card) 90' İrfan Kahveci	Stadium: New Sivas 4 Eylül Stadium; Attendance: 10,789; Referee: Halis Özkahya; Assistant referees: Bahtiyar Birinci, Kamil Çetin; Fourth official: Mustafa İlker Çoşkun; Fifth official: Ali Şansalan, Kutluhan Bilgiç

February 16, 2020 22	Trabzonspor	2–1	Sivasspor	Trabzon
16:00	Alexander Sørloth 4'; Caner Osmanpaşa 43' (o.g.); Doğan Erdoğan (yellow card) 84'; John Obi Mikel (yellow card) 90+1'	Report	(yellow card) 45' Marcelo Goiano; 90+2' Mustapha Yatabaré	Stadium: Şenol Güneş Stadium; Attendance: 33,843; Referee: Cüneyt Çakır; Assistant referees: Bahattin Duran, Tarık Ongun; Fourth official: Hakan Ceylan; Fifth official: Yaşar Kemal Uğurlu, Mustafa Emre Eyisoy

February 21, 2020 23	Sivasspor	1–0	Alanyaspor	Sivas
20:00	Mert Hakan Yandaş 9' (pen.); Erdoğan Yeşilyurt (yellow card) 32'; Marcelo Goiano (yellow card) 45+3'; Hakan Arslan (yellow card) 64'; Mamadou Samassa (yellow card) 73'; Fatih Aksoy (yellow card) 90'	Report	(yellow card) 8' Steven Caulker; (yellow card) 27' Onur Bulut	Stadium: New Sivas 4 Eylül Stadium; Attendance: 11,084; Referee: Zorbay Küçük; Assistant referees: İbrahim Çağlar Uyarcan, Volkan Ahmet Narinç; Fourth official: Yakup Özhan; Fifth official: Özgür Yankaya, Ekrem Kan

March 1, 2020 24	MKE Ankaragücü	0–3	Sivasspor	Ankara
16:00	Miloš Stojanović (yellow card) 31' (yellow card) 36' (red card)	Report	(yellow card) 56' Emre Kılınç; 69' Hakan Arslan; (penalty missed) 74' 74' Mert Hakan Yandaş; (yellow card) 76' Uğur Çiftçi; 90+1' Mustapha Yatabaré	Stadium: Eryaman Stadium; Attendance: 14,656; Referee: Ümit Öztürk; Assistant referees: Mehmet Salih Mazlum, Deniz Caner Özaral; Fourth official: Veli Karakaya; Fifth official: Emre Malok, Emre Kargın

March 8, 2020 25	Sivasspor	2–2	Galatasaray	Sivas
19:00	Hakan Arslan 7'; Fernando (yellow card) 19'; Emre Kılınç (penalty missed) 59' 59'	Report	14' Radamel Falcao; (yellow card) 18' Jean Michaël Seri; 37' Sofiane Feghouli; (yellow card) 90+7' Marcelo Saracchi	Stadium: New Sivas 4 Eylül Stadium; Attendance: 19,506; Referee: Mete Kalkavan; Assistant referees: Ceyhun Sesigüzel, Esat Sancaktar; Fourth official: Yiğit Arslan; Fifth official: Atilla Karaoğlan, Ekrem Kan

March 16, 2020 26	Antalyaspor	1–0	Sivasspor	Antalya
20:00	Lukas Podolski (yellow card) 62'; Veysel Sarı 81'	Report	(yellow card) 60' Caner Osmanpaşa; (yellow card) 65' Emre Kılınç; (yellow card) 70' (yellow card) 85' (red card) Marcelo Goiano	Stadium: New Antalya Stadium; Attendance: 0 Referee: Özgür Yankaya; Assistant referees: Mehmet Cem Hanoğlu, Kamil Çetin; Fourth official: Erkan Engin; Fifth official: Suat Arslanboğa, Cevdet Kömürcüoğlu

June 15, 2020 27	Sivasspor	1–0	Denizlispor	Sivas
21:00	Emre Kılınç (yellow card) 24'; Mustapha Yatabaré 45+3'; Fatih Aksoy (yellow card) 55'; Caner Osmanpaşa (yellow card) 77'	Report	(red card) 44' Zeki Yavru; (yellow card) 45' Hugo Rodallega; (yellow card) 90+6' Zakarya Bergdich	Stadium: New Sivas 4 Eylül Stadium; Attendance: 0 Referee: Abdulkadir Bitigen; Assistant referees: Kemal Yılmaz, Mustafa Savranlar; Fourth official: Yakup Özhan; Fifth official: Hakan Ceylan, Erkan Özdamar

June 21, 2020 28	Konyaspor	2–2	Sivasspor	Konya
21:00	Levan Shengelia (yellow card) 4'; Nejc Skubic 37' (yellow card) 48'; Deni Milošević 44'; Selim Ay (yellow card) 77'	Report	30' (yellow card) 32' Arouna Koné; 90+1' Petar Škuletić	Stadium: Büyükşehir Belediye Stadyumu; Attendance: 0 Referee: Halil Umut Meler; Assistant referees: Cevdet Kömürcüoğlu, Ekrem Kan; Fourth official: Murat Erdoğan; Fifth official: Bahattin Şimşek, Emre Kargın

June 28, 2020 29	Sivasspor	0–2	Kayserispor	Sivas
18:30	Caner Osmanpaşa (yellow card) 6'; Mert Hakan Yandaş (penalty missed) 12'; Fatih Aksoy (yellow card) 37'; Ziya Erdal (yellow card) 73'	Report	(yellow card) 13' (goal) 83' (pen.) Bernard Mensah; 45+6' Hasan Hüseyin Acar; (yellow card) 73' Muris Mešanović; (yellow card) 76' Yasir Subaşı; (yellow card) 89' Miguel Lopes	Stadium: New Sivas 4 Eylül Stadium; Attendance: 0 Referee: Mete Kalkavan; Assistant referees: Ceyhun Sesigüzel, Esat Sancaktar; Fourth official: Sarper Barış Saka; Fifth official: Koray Gençerler, Burak Pakkan

July 5, 2020 30	Kasımpaşa	0–0	Sivasspor	Istanbul
18:30	Florent Hadergjonaj (yellow card) 56' (yellow card) 62' (red card); David Pavelka (yellow card) 79'	Report	(yellow card) 24' Marcelo Goiano	Stadium: Recep Tayyip Erdoğan Stadium; Attendance: 0 Referee: Atilla Karaoğlan; Assistant referees: Osman Gökhan Bilir, İlker Takpak; Fourth official: Yasin Kol; Fifth official: Hüseyin Göçek, Yakup Özhan

July 8, 2020 31	Sivasspor	0–1	Yeni Malatyaspor	Sivas
18:30	Mustapha Yatabaré (yellow card) 26'	Report	(yellow card) 29' Teenage Hadebe; 68' Afriyie Acquah; (yellow card) 86' Fabien Farnolle	Stadium: New Sivas 4 Eylül Stadium; Attendance: 0 Referee: Yaşar Kemal Uğurlu; Assistant referees: Erdinç Sezertam, Serkan Çimen; Fourth official: Hakan Ceylan; Fifth official: Arda Kardeşler, Oğuzhan Uğurlu

July 12, 2020 32	Fenerbahçe	1–2	Sivasspor	Istanbul
21:00	Ozan Tufan (yellow card) 7'; Hasan Ali Kaldırım (yellow card) 13'; Deniz Türüç 27'; Ferdi Kadioglu (yellow card) 69'	Report	9' (pen.) Arouna Koné; (yellow card) 17' (goal) 44' Emre Kılınç; (yellow card) 76' Fatih Aksoy; (yellow card) 90+1' Mamadou Samassa	Stadium: Şükrü Saracoğlu Stadyumu; Attendance: 0 Referee: Ali Palabıyık; Assistant referees: Serkan Olguncan, Asım Yusuf Öz; Fourth official: Erkan Özdamar; Fifth official: Tugay Kaan Numanoğlu, Özgüç Türkalp

July 19, 2020 33	Sivasspor	2–0	Gençlerbirliği	Sivas
21:00		Report		Stadium: New Sivas 4 Eylül Stadium; Attendance: 0 Referee: Ümit Öztürk; Assistant referees: İbrahim Bozbey, İlker Takpak; Fourth official: Yiğit Arslan

July 2020 34	Göztepe	3–1	Sivasspor	İzmir
		Report		Stadium: Bornova Stadium; Attendance: 0
