= List of Turkish football transfers summer 2019 =

According to TFF, the 2019 summer transfer window for Turkish football transfers ran from 17 June to 2 September 2019. Clubs were, however, eligible to use buy options or terminate contracts earlier than the window starts.

On 18 July 2019, TFF announced the 2019–20 season calendar of professional leagues, as follows:

Tier	Start date	End date
Süper Lig	16 August 2019	17 May 2020
TFF First League	16 August 2019	2 May 2020
TFF Second League	1 September 2019	25 April 2020
TFF Third League	1 September 2019	25 April 2020

== Transactions ==
=== Transfers ===
All clubs without a flag are Turkish. Multiple transfer made in one day by a club are listed alphabetically, based on their forename.

Date	Name	Moving from	Moving to	Fee (Note: "m." represents "million" of mentioned currency.)	Note
17 May 2019	(Ivory Coast) Brice Dja Djédjé	Ankaragücü	Mutual termination		
17 May 2019	(Portugal) Tiago Pinto	Ankaragücü	Mutual termination		
24 May 2019	(Australia) Aziz Behich	(Netherlands) PSV Eindhoven	Başakşehir	€1.00m	
29 May 2019	(Serbia) Adem Ljajić	(Italy) Torino	Beşiktaş	€6.50m	(Note: Loan buyout close used.)
31 May 2019	(Mali) Abdoul Sissoko	Akhisar Belediyespor	Contract expiration		
31 May 2019	(Turkey) Fatih Öztürk	Akhisar Belediyespor	Contract expiration		
31 May 2019	(Turkey) Bilal Kısa	Akhisar Belediyespor	Contract expiration		
31 May 2019	(Turkey) Bora Körk	Akhisar Belediyespor	Contract expiration		
31 May 2019	(Democratic Republic of the Congo) Jeremy Bokila	Akhisar Belediyespor	Contract expiration		
31 May 2019	(Turkey) Kadir Keleş	Akhisar Belediyespor	Contract expiration		
31 May 2019	(Turkey) Cenk Ahmet Alkılıç	Alanyaspor	Contract expiration		
31 May 2019	(Cameroon) Mbilla Etame	Alanyaspor	Contract expiration		
31 May 2019	(Netherlands) Glynor Plet	Alanyaspor	Contract expiration		
31 May 2019	(Brazil) Amilton	Antalyaspor	(Portugal) Aves	Loan return	
31 May 2019	(Brazil) Diego Ângelo	Antalyaspor	Contract expiration		
31 May 2019	(Turkey) Mevlüt Erdinç	Antalyaspor	Başakşehir	Loan return	
31 May 2019	(Turkey) Salih Dursun	Antalyaspor	Contract expiration		
31 May 2019	(Turkey) Tarık Çamdal	Antalyaspor	Contract expiration		
31 May 2019	(Turkey) Yekta Kurtuluş	Antalyaspor	Contract expiration		
31 May 2019	(Italy) Alessio Cerci	Ankaragücü	Contract expiration		
31 May 2019	(Turkey) Aydın Karabulut	Ankaragücü	Contract expiration		
31 May 2019	(Turkey) Alihan Kubalas	Ankaragücü	Contract expiration		
31 May 2019	(Turkey) İlhan Parlak	Ankaragücü	Contract expiration		
31 May 2019	(Turkey) Korcan Çelikay	Ankaragücü	Contract expiration		
31 May 2019	(Argentina) Óscar Scarione	Ankaragücü	Contract expiration		
31 May 2019	(Greece) Stelios Kitsiou	Ankaragücü	(Greece) PAOK	Loan Return	
31 May 2019	(Turkey) Yalçın Ayhan	Ankaragücü	Contract expiration		
31 May 2019	(Democratic Republic of the Congo) Wilfred Moke	Ankaragücü	Contract expiration		
31 May 2019	(Brazil) Adriano	Beşiktaş	Contract expiration		
31 May 2019	(Turkey) Gökhan Töre	Beşiktaş	Contract expiration		
31 May 2019	(Turkey) Mustafa Pektemek	Beşiktaş	Contract expiration		
31 May 2019	(Japan) Shinji Kagawa	Beşiktaş	(Germany) Borussia Dortmund	Loan return	
31 May 2019	(Turkey) Tolga Zengin	Beşiktaş	Contract expiration		
31 May 2019	(Turkey) Emre Belözoğlu	Başakşehir	Contract expiration		
31 May 2019	(Bosnia and Herzegovina) Riad Bajić	Başakşehir	(Italy) Udinese	Loan return	
31 May 2019	(Germany) Serdar Tasci	Başakşehir	Contract expiration		
31 May 2019	(Turkey) Furkan Soyalp	Bursaspor	Contract expiration		
31 May 2019	(Romania) Iasmin Latovlevici	Bursaspor	Contract expiration		
31 May 2019	(France) Jirès Kembo Ekoko	Bursaspor	Contract expiration		
31 May 2019	(Brazil) Allano	Bursaspor	(Portugal) Estoril	Loan return	
31 May 2019	(Cameroon) Aurelien Chedjou	Bursaspor	Başakşehir	Loan return	
31 May 2019	(Senegal) Diafra Sakho	Bursaspor	(France) Stade Rennais	Loan return	
31 May 2019	(Senegal) Henri Saivet	Bursaspor	(England) Newcastle United	Loan return	
31 May 2019	(Turkey) Tunay Torun	Bursaspor	Başakşehir	Loan return	
31 May 2019	(Turkey) Umut Nayir	Bursaspor	Beşiktaş	Loan return	
31 May 2019	(Turkey) Egemen Korkmaz	BB Erzurumspor	Contract expiration		
31 May 2019	(Turkey) Emrah Başsan	BB Erzurumspor	Contract expiration		
31 May 2019	(Turkey) Kerem Civelek	BB Erzurumspor	Contract expiration		
31 May 2019	(Democratic Republic of the Congo) Ridge Munsy	BB Erzurumspor	(Switzerland) Grasshopper	Loan return	
31 May 2019	(Turkey) Samed Kaya	BB Erzurumspor	Contract expiration		
31 May 2019	(Turkey) Serkan Kurtuluş	BB Erzurumspor	Contract expiration		
31 May 2019	(Turkey) Tolga Ünlü	BB Erzurumspor	Contract expiration		
31 May 2019	(Ghana) Andre Ayew	Fenerbahçe	(England) Swansea City	Loan return	
31 May 2019	(Turkey) Erten Ersu	Fenerbahçe	Contract expiration		
31 May 2019	(Algeria) Islam Slimani	Fenerbahçe	(England) Leicester City	Loan return	
31 May 2019	(Turkey) İsmail Köybaşı	Fenerbahçe	Contract expiration		
31 May 2019	(Slovakia) Martin Škrtel	Fenerbahçe	Contract expiration		
31 May 2019	(France) Mathieu Valbuena	Fenerbahçe	Contract expiration		
31 May 2019	(Russia) Roman Neustadter	Fenerbahçe	Contract expiration		
31 May 2019	(Spain) Roberto Soldado	Fenerbahçe	Contract expiration		
31 May 2019	(Turkey) Şener Özbayraklı	Fenerbahçe	Contract expiration		
31 May 2019	(Turkey) Tolga Ciğerci	Fenerbahçe	Contract expiration		
31 May 2019	(Turkey) Volkan Demirel	Fenerbahçe	Contract expiration		
31 May 2019	(France) Yassine Benzia	Fenerbahçe	(France) Lille	Loan return	
31 May 2019	(Democratic Republic of the Congo) Christian Luyindama	Galatasaray	(Belgium) Standard Liège	Loan return	
31 May 2019	(Switzerland) Eren Derdiyok	Galatasaray	Contract expiration		
31 May 2019	(Nigeria) Henry Onyekuru	Galatasaray	(England) Everton	Loan return	
31 May 2019	(Turkey) Muğdat Çelik	Galatasaray	Contract expiration		
31 May 2019	(Turkey) Selçuk İnan	Galatasaray	Contract expiration		
31 May 2019	(Turkey) Semih Kaya	Galatasaray	(Czech Republic) Sparta Prague	Loan return	
31 May 2019	(Germany) Sinan Gümüş	Galatasaray	Contract expiration		
31 May 2019	(Ivory Coast) Adama Traoré	Göztepe	Contract expiration		
31 May 2019	(Brazil) Kadu	Göztepe	Contract expiration		
31 May 2019	(France) Yoan Gouffran	Göztepe	Contract expiration		
31 May 2019	(Turkey) Tayfur Bingöl	Göztepe	Contract expiration		
31 May 2019	(Turkey) Berkan Emir	Göztepe	Contract expiration		
31 May 2019	(Ghana) Lumor Agbenyenu	Göztepe	(Portugal) Sporting CP	Loan return	
31 May 2019	(Turkey) Eray Birniçan	Kasımpaşa	Contract expiration		
31 May 2019	(Portugal) Josué Sá	Kasımpaşa	(Belgium) Anderlecht	Loan return	
31 May 2019	(Egypt) Karim Hafez	Kasımpaşa	(Egypt) Wadi Degla	Loan return	
31 May 2019	(Italy) Simone Scuffet	Kasımpaşa	(Italy) Udinese	Loan return	
31 May 2019	(Croatia) Stipe Perica	Kasımpaşa	(Italy) Udinese	Loan return	
31 May 2019	(Turkey) Tarkan Serbest	Kasımpaşa	Austria Wien	Loan return	
31 May 2019	(Ghana) Asamoah Gyan	Kayserispor	Contract expiration		
31 May 2019	(Ghana) Bernard Mensah	Kayserispor	(Spain) Atlético Madrid	Loan return	
31 May 2019	(Romania) Cristian Sapunaru	Kayserispor	Contract expiration		
31 May 2019	(Cameroon) Jean-Armel Kana-Biyik	Kayserispor	Contract expiration		
31 May 2019	(Turkey) Mert Özyıldırım	Kayserispor	Contract expiration		
31 May 2019	(Turkey) Muammer Yıldırım	Kayserispor	Contract expiration		
31 May 2019	(Ukraine) Oleksandr Kucher	Kayserispor	Contract expiration		
31 May 2019	(Turkey) Şamil Çinaz	Kayserispor	Contract expiration		
31 May 2019	(Portugal) Silvestre Varela	Kayserispor	Contract expiration		
31 May 2019	(Portugal) Tiago Lopes	Kayserispor	Contract expiration		
31 May 2019	(Netherlands) Tjaronn Chery	Kayserispor	(China) Guizhou Hengfeng	Loan return	
31 May 2019	(Ivory Coast) Abdou Razack Traoré	Konyaspor	Contract expiration		
31 May 2019	(Germany) Ali Çamdalı	Konyaspor	Contract expiration		
31 May 2019	(Ivory Coast) Moryké Fofana	Konyaspor	Contract expiration		
31 May 2019	(Mali) Mustapha Yatabaré	Konyaspor	Contract expiration		
31 May 2019	(Brazil) David Braz	Sivasspor	(Brazil) Santos	34	
31 May 2019	(Democratic Republic of the Congo) Delvin N'Dinga	Sivasspor	Contract expiration		
31 May 2019	(Brazil) Douglas	Sivasspor	(Spain) Barcelona	Loan return	
31 May 2019	(France) Fousseni Diabaté	Sivasspor	(England) Leicester City	Loan return	
31 May 2019	(Romania) Gabriel Torje	Sivasspor	Contract expiration		
31 May 2019	(Turkey) Hakan Arslan	Sivasspor	Contract expiration		
31 May 2019	(Sweden) Mattias Bjarsmyr	Sivasspor	Contract expiration		
31 May 2019	(Turkey) Muhammet Demir	Sivasspor	Contract expiration		
31 May 2019	(Turkey) Özer Hurmacı	Sivasspor	Contract expiration		
31 May 2019	(Romania) Paul Papp	Sivasspor	Contract expiration		
31 May 2019	(Uruguay) Sergio Rochet	Sivasspor	Contract expiration		
31 May 2019	(Turkey) Tolgahan Acar	Sivasspor	Contract expiration		
31 May 2019	(Colombia) Hugo Rodallega	Trabzonspor	Contract expiration		
31 May 2019	(Turkey) Kamil Ahmet Çörekçi	Trabzonspor	Contract expiration		
31 May 2019	(Argentina) Luis Ibáñez	Trabzonspor	Contract expiration		
31 May 2019	(Turkey) Olcay Şahan	Trabzonspor	Contract expiration		
31 May 2019	(France) Aboubakar Kamara	Yeni Malatyaspor	(England) Fulham	Loan return	
31 May 2019	(Turkey) Adem Büyük	Yeni Malatyaspor	Contract expiration		
31 May 2019	(Turkey) Barış Alıcı	Yeni Malatyaspor	Fenerbahçe	Loan return	
31 May 2019	(Turkey) Erkan Kaş	Yeni Malatyaspor	Contract expiration		
31 May 2019	(Turkey) Ertaç Özbir	Yeni Malatyaspor	Contract expiration		
31 May 2019	(Brazil) Guilherme	Yeni Malatyaspor	(Italy) Benevento	Loan return	
31 May 2019	(France) Michaël Pereira	Yeni Malatyaspor	Contract expiration		
31 May 2019	(Turkey) Murat Akça	Yeni Malatyaspor	Contract expiration		
31 May 2019	(Turkey) Murat Yıldırım	Yeni Malatyaspor	Contract expiration		
31 May 2019	(Turkey) Ömer Şişmanoğlu	Yeni Malatyaspor	Contract expiration		
15 June 2019	(Turkey) Murat Sağlam	(Germany) VfL Wolfsburg II	Fenerbahçe	Undisclosed	
15 June 2019	(Greece) Tasos Bakasetas	(Greece) AEK	Alanyaspor	Undisclosed	
17 June 2019	(Turkey) Fıratcan Üzüm	Eskişehirspor	Trabzonspor	Undisclosed	
17 June 2019	(Romania) Cristian Sapunaru	Unattached	Denizlispor	Free	
17 June 2019	(Turkey) Fatih Öztürk	Unattached	Kasımpaşa	Free	
18 June 2019	(Turkey) Yusuf Sarı	(France) Marseille	Trabzonspor	Undisclosed	
18 June 2019	(Portugal) Tiago Lopes	Unattached	Denizlispor	Free	
19 June 2019	(Turkey) Tolgahan Acar	Sivasspor	Released		
19 June 2019	(Turkey) Salih Kirazlı	Altınordu	Trabzonspor	₺0.60m	
19 June 2019	(Turkey) Atakan Gürbüz	Altınordu	Trabzonspor	₺0.60m	
19 June 2019	(Ukraine) Mykola Morozyuk	(Ukraine) Dynamo Kyiv	Çaykur Rizespor	Undisclosed	
19 June 2019	(Turkey) Murat Paluli	Hatayspor	Göztepe	Undisclosed	
20 June 2019	(Togo) Emmanuel Adebayor	Başakşehir	Released		
20 June 2019	(Ivory Coast) Moryké Fofana	Unattached	Yeni Malatyaspor	Free	
21 June 2019	(Turkey) Tolgahan Acar	Unattached	Denizlispor	Free	
24 June 2019	(Senegal) Mame Baba Thiam	(United Arab Emirates) Ajman Club	Kasımpaşa	Undisclosed	
24 June 2019	(North Macedonia) Adis Jahović	Konyaspor	Yeni Malatyaspor	Undisclosed	
24 June 2019	(Guinea) Sadio Diallo	Hatayspor	Gençlerbirliği	Undisclosed	
25 June 2019	(France) Pierre-Yves Polomat	(France) Saint-Étienne	Gençlerbirliği	Undisclosed	
25 June 2019	(Norway) Fredrik Gulbrandsen	(Austria) Red Bull Salzburg	Başakşehir	Undisclosed	
26 June 2019	(Turkey) Mehmet Topal	Fenerbahçe	Mutual termination		
28 June 2019	(Turkey) Adem Büyük	Unattached	Galatasaray	Free	
28 June 2019	(Nigeria) Valentine Ozornwafor	(Nigeria) Enyimba Aba	Galatasaray	Undisclosed	
28 June 2019	(Senegal) Abdoulaye Diallo	(France) Rennais	Gençlerbirliği	Undisclosed	
29 June 2019	(Netherlands) Ryan Babel	Unattached	Galatasaray	Free	
1 July 2019	(Iran) Allahyar Sayyadmanesh	(Iran) Esteghlal	Fenerbahçe	€0.85m	
2 July 2019	(Turkey) Emre Belözoğlu	Unattached	Fenerbahçe	Free	
2 July 2019	(Sweden) Jimmy Durmaz	Unattached	Galatasaray	Free	
2 July 2019	(Turkey) Şener Özbayraklı	Unattached	Galatasaray	Free	
3 July 2019	(Germany) Max Kruse	Unattached	Fenerbahçe	Free	
3 July 2019	(Bosnia and Herzegovina) Nemanja Andjusic	(Bosnia and Herzegovina) Mladost	Trabzonspor	€0.05	
5 July 2019	(Turkey) Gökhan Değirmenci	Boluspor	Akhisar Belediyespor	Undisclosed	
8 July 2019	(Iran) Vahid Amiri	Trabzonspor	Mutual termination		
8 July 2019	(Turkey) Altay Bayındır	Ankaragücü	Fenerbahçe	Undisclosed	
8 July 2019	(Kosovo) Vedat Muriqi	Çaykur Rizespor	Fenerbahçe	€3.50m (Note: According to agreement between parties, Fenerbahçe S.K. to pay €3.50m transfer fee to Çaykur Rizespor in scope of transfers including Vedat Muriqi (to Fenerbahçe), and Mahsun Çapkan, Burak Albayrak (to Çaykur Rizespor). Additionally, Oğuz Kağan Güçtekin is to be loaned out at Çaykur Rizespor for a season long.)	
8 July 2019	(Turkey) Eray İşcan	Unattached	Kayserispor	Free	
8 July 2019	(Kosovo) Donis Avdijaj	(Netherlands) Willem II	Trabzonspor	Undisclosed	
8 July 2019	(Turkey) Selçuk İnan	Unattached	Galatasaray	Free	(Note: Player re-agreed with his most recent club where he was released at the end of 2018-19 season.)
8 July 2019	(Ivory Coast) Brice Dja Djédjé	Unattached	Kayserispor	Free	
10 July 2019	(Switzerland) Eren Derdiyok	Unattached	Göztepe	Free	
10 July 2019	(Turkey) Yusuf Erdoğan	Unattached	Kasımpaşa	Free	
10 July 2019	(Turkey) Salih Uçan	Unattached	Alanyaspor	Free	
10 July 2019	(Turkey) Yasir Subaşı	Ümraniyespor	Fenerbahçe	₺1.0m	(Note: Buyback close used.)
10 July 2019	(Turkey) Osman Çelik	Unattached	Antalyaspor	Free	
11 July 2019	(Turkey) Ahmet İlhan Özek	Unattached	Giresunspor	Free	
11 July 2019	(Turkey) Bekir Yılmaz	Unattached	Giresunspor	Free	
12 July 2019	(Turkey) Yasir Subaşı	Fenerbahçe	Kayserispor	€0.60m	
12 July 2019	(Portugal) Miguel Lopes	Akhisar Belediyespor	Kayserispor	Undisclosed	
12 July 2019	(Tunisia) Aymen Abdennour	(France) Marseille	Kayserispor	Undisclosed	
12 July 2019	(Ivory Coast) Giovanni Sio	(France) Montpellier	Gençlerbirliği	Undisclosed	
12 July 2019	(Brazil) Fernando	Galatasaray	(Spain) Sevilla	€4.50m	
13 July 2019	(Turkey) Mahsun Çapkan	Fenerbahçe	Çaykur Rizespor	Undisclosed	
13 July 2019	(Turkey) Burak Albayrak	Fenerbahçe	Çaykur Rizespor	Undisclosed	
13 July 2019	(Slovenia) Amedej Vetrih	(Slovenia) Domžale	Çaykur Rizespor	Undisclosed	
14 July 2019	(France) Abdelaye Diakité	Unattached	Menemen Belediyespor	Free	
14 July 2019	(Turkey) Özgür Can Özcan	Unattached	Giresunspor	Free	
14 July 2019	(Turkey) Mehmet Güven	Unattached	Giresunspor	Free	
15 July 2020	(United States) Tyler Boyd	(Portugal) Vitória de Guimarães	Beşiktaş	€2.40m	
16 July 2020	(Poland) Legia Warsaw	(Poland) Michał Pazdan	Undisclosed		
16 July 2019	(Turkey) Gökhan Töre	Unattached	Yeni Malatyaspor	Free	
16 July 2019	(France) Ghislain Gimbert	(France) Ajaccio	Ümraniyespor	Undisclosed	
16 July 2019	(Republic of Ireland) Anthony Stokes	(Iran) Tractor Sazi	Adana Demirspor	Undisclosed	
16 July 2019	(Morocco) Abdelaziz Barrada	Antalyaspor	Mutual termination		
16 July 2019	(Russia) Zaur Sadayev	(Russia) Grozny	Ankaragücü	Undisclosed	
16 July 2019	(Turkey) Yusuf Acer	Altınordu	Çaykur Rizespor	Undisclosed	
17 July 2019	(Ghana) Isaac Cofie	(Spain) Sporting Gijón	Sivasspor	Undisclosed	
18 July 2019	(Senegal) Zargo Touré	Trabzonspor	Gençlerbirliği	Undisclosed	
18 July 2019	(Cameroon) Jean-Armel Kana-Biyik	Unattached	Gazişehir	Free	
18 July 2019	(Turkey) Okan Kocuk	Unattached	Galatasaray	Free	
21 July 2019	(Romania) Alin Tosca	(Spain) Real Betis	Gazişehir	Undisclosed	
22 July 2019	(Tunisia) Ghaylen Chaaleli	(Tunisia) ES Tunis	Yeni Malatyaspor	Undisclosed	
22 July 2019	(Greece) Stelios Kitsiou	(Greece) PAOK	Ankaragücü	Undisclosed	
22 July 2019	(Portugal) Daniel Candeias	(Scotland) Rangers	Gençlerbirliği	Undisclosed	
22 July 2019	(Senegal) Papy Djilobodji	(France) EA Guingamp	Gazişehir	Undisclosed	
24 July 2019	(Mali) Mustapha Yatabaré	Unattached	Sivasspor	Free	
24 July 2019	(Turkey) Güray Vural	Akhisar Belediyespor	Gazişehir	Undisclosed	
24 July 2019	(Egypt) Trézéguet	Kasımpaşa	(England) Aston Villa	€10.00 m	
25 July 2019	(Brazil) Douglas	Unattached	Beşiktaş	Free	
26 July 2019	(Belgium) Nill De Pauw	(Belgium) Zulte Waregem	Çaykur Rizespor	Undisclosed	
27 July 2019	(France) Enzo Crivelli	(France) SM Caen	Başakşehir	Undisclosed	
29 July 2019	(Democratic Republic of the Congo) Christian Luyindama	(Belgium) Standard Liège	Galatasaray	€5.00 m	
29 July 2019	(Cape Verde) Carlos Ponck	(Portugal) Aves	Başakşehir	Undisclosed	
29 July 2019	(Turkey) Mustafa Pektemek	Unattached	Kasımpaşa	Free	
30 July 2019	(Portugal) Miguel Vieira	(Spain) Lugo	Başakşehir	Undisclosed	
30 July 2019	(Poland) Radosław Murawski	(Italy) Palermo	Denizlispor	Undisclosed	
2 August 2019	(Bosnia and Herzegovina) Marin Aničić	(Kazakhstan) Astana	Konyaspor	Undisclosed	
3 August 2019	(Turkey) Deniz Türüç	Kayserispor	Fenerbahçe	€2.00 m	
3 August 2019	(Poland) Bartłomiej Pawłowski	(Poland) Zagłębie Lubin	Gazişehir	Undisclosed	
3 August 2019	(Mali) Souleymane Diarra	(France) Lens	Gazişehir	Undisclosed	
3 August 2019	(Russia) Yuri Lodygin	(Russia) Zenit	Gazişehir	Undisclosed	
5 August 2019	(Ghana) Abdul Aziz Tetteh	(Russia) Dynamo Moscow	Gazişehir	Undisclosed	
5 August 2019	(Serbia) Armin Djerlek	(Serbia) Partizan	Sivasspor	Undisclosed	
6 August 2019	(Turkey) Yusuf Yazıcı	Trabzonspor	(France) Lille	€17.50m	
7 August 2019	(Spain) Victor Ruiz	(Spain) Villarreal	Beşiktaş J.K.	Undisclosed	
8 August 2019	(Ghana) Raman Chibsah	(Italy) Fronsinone	Gazişehir	Undisclosed	
8 August 2019	(Turkey) Semih Uçar	(Germany) Arminia Bielefeld	Adanaspor	Undisclosed	
12 August 2019	(Turkey) Aksel Aktaş	(France) Stade Reims	Kayserispor	Undisclosed	
13 August 2019	(Turkey) Umut Meraş	Bursaspor	(France) Le Havre	€1.30 m	
13 August 2019	(Turkey) Çekdar Orhan	Galatasaray	Akhisar Belediyespor	Undisclosed	
13 August 2019	(Turkey) Barış Başdaş	Alanyaspor	Fatih Karagümrük	Undisclosed	
15 August 2019	(Turkey) Olcay Şahan	Unattached	Denizlispor	Free	
15 August 2019	(Turkey) Umut Güneş	(Germany) VfB Stuttgart	Alanyaspor	Undisclosed	
16 August 2019	(Turkey) Yıldırım Mert Çetin	Gençlerbirliği	(Italy) Roma	€3.00 m	
16 August 2019	(Romania) Paul Papp	Unattached	Sivasspor	Free	
20 August 2019	(Turkey) Yasin Ozan	Unattached	Altınordu	Free	
20 August 2019	(Uganda) Farouk Miya	(Croatia) HNK Gorica	Konyaspor	Undisclosed	
20 August 2019	(Turkey) Lokman Gör	Erzurum BB	Alanyaspor	Undisclosed	
20 August 2019	(Turkey) Eren Albayrak	(Japan) Jubilo Iwata	Antalyaspor	Undisclosed	
21 August 2019	(Greece) Kostas Mitroglou	Galatasaray	Mutual termination (Note: An ongoing one-and-a-half-season loan-contract between Galatasaray and Marseille is cancelled due to will of Galatasaray. Mitroglu joined Dutch side PSV Eindhoven with another loan contract in which Galatasaray to cover €0.70 million of seasonal wage of Mitroglu.)		
21 August 2019	(Turkey) Erdem Özgenç	Gençlerbirliği	Karagümrük	Undisclosed	
25 August 2019	(Argentina) Gustavo Blanco Leschuk	(Ukraine) Shakhtar Donetsk	Antalyaspor	Undisclosed	
26 August 2019	(Turkey) Ertuğrul Ersoy	Bursaspor	(France) Le Havre	Undisclosed	
26 August 2019	(Turkey) Mehmet Topal	Unattached	Başakşehir	Free	
26 August 2019	(Togo) Emmanuel Adebayor	Unattached	Kayserispor	Free	
27 August 2019	(France) Adil Rami	Unattached	Fenerbahçe	Free	
28 August 2019	(Turkey) Ertaç Özbir	Unattached	Gençlerbirliği	Free	
28 August 2019	(Turkey) Sakıb Aytaç	Kayserispor	Yeni Malatyaspor	Undisclosed	
28 August 2019	(Turkey) Taha Yalçıner	Alanyaspor	Akhisar Belediyespor	Undisclosed	
28 August 2019	(Cameroon) Carlos Kameni	Fenerbahçe	Mutual termination		
29 August 2019	(Chile) Gary Medel	Beşiktaş	(Italy) Bologna	Undisclosed	
29 August 2019	(Azerbaijan) Ufuk Budak	Unattached	Altınordu	Free	
29 August 2019	(Sweden) Mattias Bjarsmyr	Unattached	Gençlerbirliği	Free	
29 August 2019	(Portugal) Ricardo Quaresma	Beşiktaş	Kasımpaşa	€0.50m	
30 August 2019	(Turkey) Erdem Özgenç	Karagümrük	Gençlerbirliği	Undisclosed	
30 August 2019	(Turkey) Mevlüt Erdinç	Başakşehir	Fenerbahçe	Undisclosed	
30 August 2019	(Serbia) Danijel Aleksić	(Saudi Arabia) Al-Ahli	Başakşehir	Undisclosed	
30 August 2019	(Turkey) Anıl Karaer	Osmanlıspor	Bursaspor	Undisclosed	
30 August 2019	(Turkey) Aykut Akgün	Şanlıurfaspor	Bursaspor	Undisclosed	
30 August 2019	(Turkey) Cüneyt Köz	Balıkesirspor	Bursaspor	Undisclosed	
30 August 2019	(Turkey) Çağlar Şahin Akbaba	Adana Demirspor	Bursaspor	Undisclosed	
30 August 2019	(Senegal) Mamadou Diarra	Boluspor	Bursaspor	Undisclosed	
30 August 2019	(Turkey) Musa Araz	Konyaspor	Bursaspor	Undisclosed	
30 August 2019	(Turkey) Onurcan Piri	Yeni Çorumspor	Bursaspor	Undisclosed	
30 August 2019	(Turkey) Recep Aydın	Konyaspor	Bursaspor	Undisclosed	
2 September 2019	(Brazil) Igor	Gazişehir	Bursaspor	Undisclosed	
2 September 2019	(Turkey) Özer Hurmacı	Unattached	Bursaspor	Free	
2 September 2019	(Turkey) Selçuk Şahin	Unattached	Bursaspor	Free	
2 September 2019	(Ukraine) Yevhen Seleznyov	Unattached	Bursaspor	Free	
2 September 2019	(Turkey) Taylan Antalyalı	BB Erzurumspor	Galatasaray	Free	
2 September 2019	(Nigeria) Aminu Umar	Unattached	Çaykur Rizespor	Free	
2 September 2019	(Brazil) Luiz Gustavo	(France) Marseille	Fenerbahçe	€6.50m	
2 September 2019	(Turkey) Özgür Özdemir	(Germany) 1. FC Kaiserslautern	Adanaspor	Undisclosed	
2 September 2019	(Turkey) Kağan Söylemezgiller	Fethiyespor	Adanaspor	Undisclosed	
2 September 2019	(France) Mustafa Gökay Eğer	(France) AS Monaco FC	Adanaspor	Undisclosed	
2 September 2019	(Slovakia) Martin Škrtel	Unattached	Başakşehir	Free	
2 September 2019	(Italy) Stefano Napoleoni	Başakşehir	Göztepe	Undisclosed	
2 September 2019	(Colombia) Radamel Falcao	(France) Monaco	Galatasaray	Undisclosed	
2 September 2019	(Togo) Floyd Ayite	(England) Fulham	Gençlerbirliği	Undisclosed	
2 September 2019	(Portugal) Mossoró	Başakşehir	Göztepe	Undisclosed	
2 September 2019	(Cameroon) Aurélien Chedjou	Başakşehir	(France) Amiens	Undisclosed	

=== Loans ===
Start date	End date	Name	Moving from	Moving to	Note
13 June 2019	31 May 2020	(Bosnia and Herzegovina) Riad Bajić	(Italy) Udinese	Konyaspor	
4 July 2019	31 May 2020	(Turkey) Recep Gül	Galatasaray	(Belgium) Westerlo	
5 July 2019	31 May 2020	(Canada) Cyle Larin	Beşiktaş	(Belgium) Zulte Waregem	
8 July 2019	31 May 2020	(Morocco) Yacine Bammou	(France) Caen	Alanyaspor	
10 July 2019	31 May 2020	(Nigeria) Azubuike Okechukwu	(Egypt) Pyramids	Başakşehir	
12 July 2019	31 May 2020	(Turkey) Sedat Şahintürk	Beşiktaş	Denizlispor	
13 July 2019	31 May 2021	(Cape Verde) Garry Rodrigues	(Saudi Arabia) Al-Ittihad	Fenerbahçe	
13 July 2019	20 July 2020	(Turkey) Oğuz Kağan Güçtekin	Fenerbahçe	Çaykur Rizespor	
20 July 2019	31 May 2020	(Turkey) Berke Özer	Fenerbahçe	(Belgium) Westerlo	
30 July 2019	31 May 2020	(Turkey) Barış Alıcı	Fenerbahçe	Çaykur Rizespor	
2 August 2019	31 May 2020	(Turkey) Emre Mor	(Spain) Celta Vigo	Galatasaray	
2 August 2019	31 May 2020	(Portugal) Ivanildo Fernandes	(Portugal) Sporting	Trabzonspor	
4 August 2019	31 May 2021	(Norway) Alexander Sørloth	(England) Crystal Palace	Trabzonspor	
9 August 2019	31 May 2020	(Nigeria) Olarenwaju Kayode	(Ukraine) Shakhtar Donetsk	Gazişehir	
10 August 2019	31 May 2021	(Turkey) İsmail Çipe	Galatasaray	Kayserispor	
9 August 2019	31 May 2021	(Brazil) Fernando	(Portugal) Porto	Sivasspor	
9 August 2019	31 May 2021	(Brazil) Flávio Ramos	(Portugal) Feirense	Sivasspor	
12 August 2019	31 May 2020	(The Gambia) Modou Barrow	(England) Reading	Denizlispor	
12 August 2019	31 May 2020	(Portugal) Pedro Rebocho	(France) Guingamp	Beşiktaş	
16 August 2019	31 May 2020	(Ghana) Joseph Attamah	Başakşehir	Çaykur Rizespor	
16 August 2019	31 May 2020	(France) Steven Nzonzi	(Italy) Roma	Galatasaray	
19 August 2019	31 May 2020	(Switzerland) Michael Frey	Fenerbahçe	(Germany) 1. FC Nürnberg	
21 August 2019	31 May 2020	(France) Nicolas Isimat-Mirin	Beşiktaş	(France) Toulouse	
21 August 2019	31 May 2020	(Turkey) Oğuzhan Akgün	Beşiktaş	Istanbulspor	
23 August 2019	31 May 2020	(Angola) Gelson	(Portugal) Sporting CP	Antalyaspor	
25 August 2019	31 May 2020	(Cameroon) Paul-Georges Ntep	(Germany) VfL Wolfsburg	Kayserispor	
25 August 2019	31 May 2020	(Brazil) Yan Sasse	(Brazil) Vasco da Gama	Çaykur Rizespor	
31 August 2019	31 May 2020	(Egypt) Mohamed Elneny	(England) Arsenal	Beşiktaş	
2 September 2019	31 May 2020	(Bosnia and Herzegovina) Nemanja Andusic	Trabzonspor	Balıkesirspor	
2 September 2019	31 May 2020	(Iran) Allahyar Sayyadmanesh	Fenerbahçe	İstanbulspor	
2 September 2019	31 May 2020	(Turkey) Berkay Özcan	(Germany) Hamburger SV	Başakşehir	
2 September 2019	31 May 2020	(Mali) Abdoulay Diaby	(Portugal) Sporting CP	Beşiktaş	
2 September 2019	31 May 2020	(Turkey) Yusuf Mert Tunç	Fenerbahçe S.K.	Boluspor	
2 September 2019	31 May 2020	(Romania) Florin Andone	(England) Brighton	Galatasaray	
2 September 2019	31 May 2020	(Senegal) Mbaye Diagne	Galatasaray	(Belgium) Brugge	
2 September 2019	31 May 2020	(Turkey) Furkan Soyalp	Başakşehir	Gazişehir	
