= Hugo Rodallega =

Colombian footballer (born 1985)

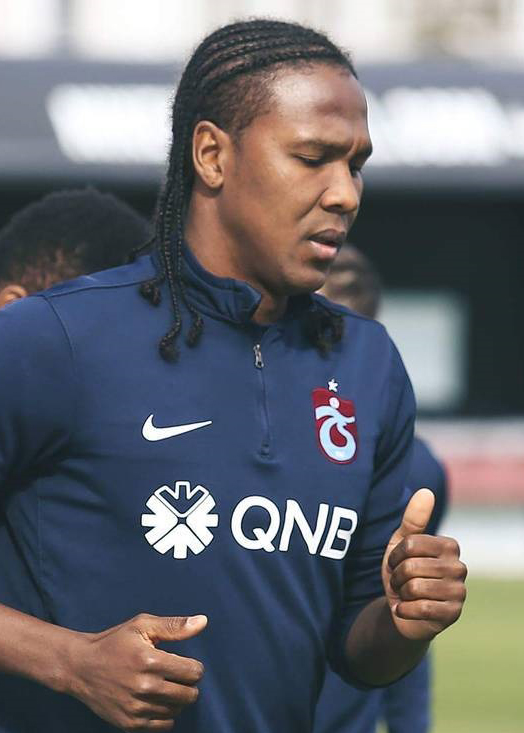
- Rodallega with Trabzonspor in 2017

Personal information
- Full name: Hugo Rodallega Martínez
- Date of birth: 25 July 1985 (age 41)
- Place of birth: El Carmelo, Colombia
- Height: 1.81 m (5 ft 11 in)
- Positions: Forward; winger

Team information
- Current team: Santa Fe
- Number: 11

Senior career*
Years	Team	Apps	(Gls)
2004–2005	Deportes Quindío	43	(20)
2005	Deportivo Cali	26	(12)
2006–2007	Monterrey	29	(4)
2006	→ Atlas (loan)	17	(5)
2007–2009	Necaxa	53	(25)
2009–2012	Wigan Athletic	112	(24)
2012–2015	Fulham	75	(15)
2015–2017	Akhisarspor	51	(23)
2017–2019	Trabzonspor	71	(26)
2019–2021	Denizlispor	68	(20)
2021–2022	Bahia	60	(19)
2023–	Santa Fe	162	(72)

International career
2005	Colombia U20	12	(12)
2005–2011	Colombia	43	(8)
- * Club domestic league appearances and goals as of 15 May 2026

Hugo Rodallega Martínez (born 25 July 1985) is a Colombian professional footballer who plays as a forward for Categoría Primera A club Santa Fe.

Rodallega started his professional career with Deportes Quindío in 2004. He was called up to represent Colombia at the U-20 South American Championship in 2005, where he set a new record for most goals scored in the tournament. A move to Deportivo Cali and his senior international debut followed later in the year before he signed for Mexican Primera División side Monterrey. He was loaned to Atlas before being transferred to Necaxa in 2007.

In January 2009, he moved to Wigan Athletic for a fee of £4.5 million. He finished as the club's top goalscorer in his first full Premier League season. He scored 24 goals for the club, making him their all-time leading English top-flight goalscorer.

== Early and personal life ==
Rodallega was born in El Carmelo, Colombia, and lived in the village with his parents and two elder sisters. Rodallega and his wife Carolina have a son, also named Hugo, who plays for Santa Fe, and two daughters, Darcy and Keyla. His cousin Carmen is also a footballer, and has played for the Colombia women's national football team.

== Club career ==
=== Early career ===
Rodallega began his career at local amateur club Boca Juniors de Cali before signing for Deportes Quindío in 2004. He scored his first goal in professional football on 11 April 2004 in a 1–1 draw against Deportivo Cali. He went on to score a total of 13 goals in his first season, earning himself a call-up to the Colombia under-20 squad for the South American Youth Championship. He signed for Deportivo Cali during the middle of the 2005 season, where he won his first honours at club level, helping the team win the 2005-II Copa Mustang.

Rodallega had now caught the attention of foreign clubs and signed for Mexican Primera División club Monterrey in 2006. He failed to replicate his previous goal scoring record, finding the net three times before being loaned out to Atlas. He was then transfer listed after scoring just once in 15 games for Monterrey during the Clausura 2007 tournament, and was subsequently signed by Necaxa. His spell at Necaxa was more successful, where he managed to score 16 goals during his first season with the club.

=== Wigan Athletic ===
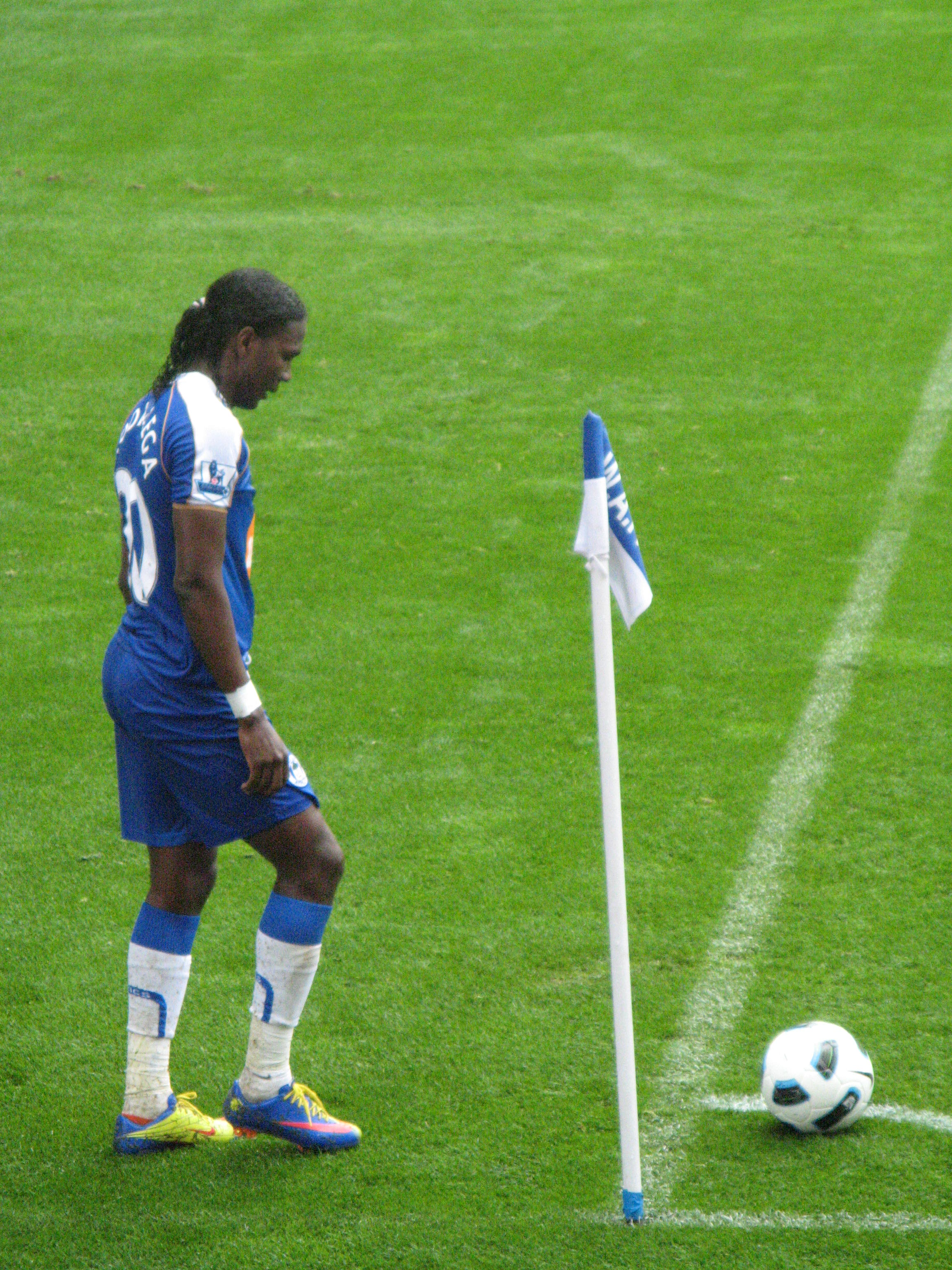
Rodallega taking a corner for Wigan Athletic in 2010

On 20 December 2008, Necaxa claimed they had started negotiations to sell Rodallega to English Premier League side Wigan Athletic. On 12 January, Wigan manager Steve Bruce confirmed that Rodallega had been granted a work permit, and on 26 January he finally completed his move to the club for a fee of £4.5 million.

Rodallega made his debut for Wigan as a 77th-minute substitute for Amr Zaki against Liverpool on 28 January 2009 at the DW Stadium. He nearly made an instant impact for his new team, hitting the crossbar with a powerful strike from a 25-yard free-kick. After a slow start, he scored his first goal for Wigan against West Brom on 9 May 2009, and went on to score three goals in the last four games of the season, helping the club finish in 11th place.

In Wigan's first match of the 2009–10 season, Rodallega got the team's first goal of the season in a 2–0 away win against Aston Villa, with a "spectacular" half-volley from the corner of the penalty area. Rodallega appeared in all 38 league games during the season, and despite Wigan's new manager Roberto Martínez often playing him on the left wing, he also finished as the club's top goalscorer with ten league goals. On 5 February 2011, Rodallega scored his seventh goal of the season in a 4–3 win against Blackburn Rovers, equalling the club record of 20 Premier League goals for Wigan. He broke that record on 16 April, scoring the opening goal in a 3–1 win against Blackpool at Bloomfield Road, making him Wigan's leading goalscorer of all time in the Premier League. On 22 May 2011 Rodallega scored a 78th-minute header against Stoke City at the Britannia Stadium which secured a 1–0 win and Wigan's Premier League status for 2011–12.

On 17 December 2011, Rodallega made his 100th league appearance for Wigan, coming onto the pitch as a substitute against Chelsea. Rodallega later announced that he wanted to leave Wigan and despite no deals were made officially in the January 2012 transfer window. At the end of the 2012 season he was released by the club, his contract having lapsed.

=== Fulham ===
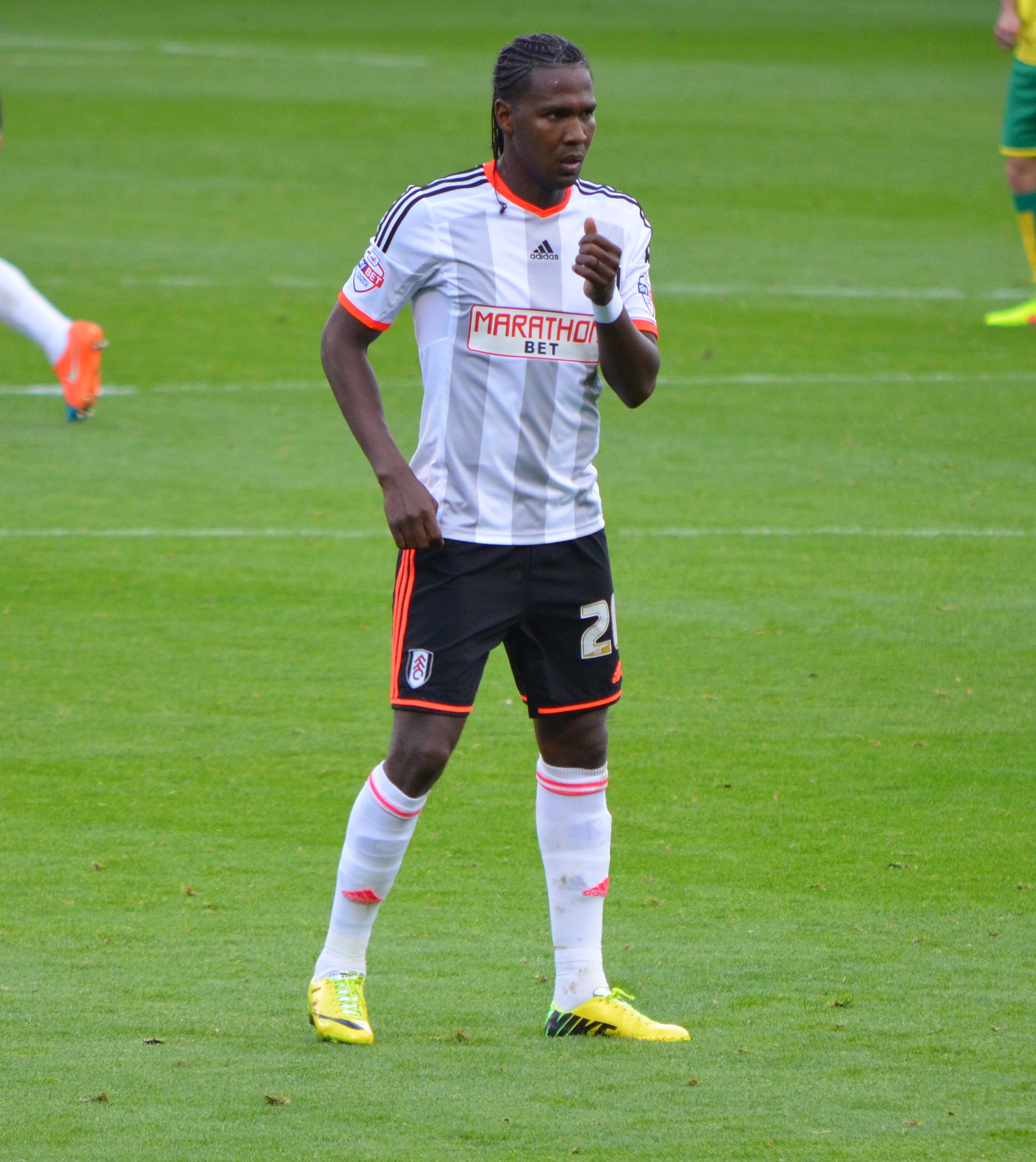
Rodallega playing for Fulham in 2014

On 12 July 2012, Rodallega signed a three-year deal with Fulham after the expiration of his contract at Wigan. He scored his first Fulham goal to open the scoring against former club Wigan in a 2–1 away win on 22 September 2012. He then found the net for a second time against Newcastle United on 10 December 2012 at Craven Cottage, heading in Damien Duff's free kick to win the game 2–1. It was Fulham's first win in seven games.

Rodallega scored the winning goal against fellow strugglers Birmingham City on 27 September 2014, helping Fulham claim their first league victory of the season. On 1 October, Rodallega opened the scoring as Fulham thrashed Bolton 4–0 for their third consecutive win under caretaker manager Kit Symons. On 24 October, Rodallega scored twice as they defeated London rivals Charlton 3–0 to move Fulham out of the relegation zone.

=== Akhisar Belediyespor ===
Rodallega signed with Akhisar Belediyespor in 2015. He scored a hat-trick against league leaders Beşiktaş on 23 April 2016. By doing so, he became the first foreign player at Akhisar to score three goals in a match.

== International career ==
In 2005, Rodallega was selected in Colombia's squad for the U-20 South American Championship. He made his debut in Colombia's opening game against Bolivia. He came onto the pitch as a half-time substitute, and went on to score four goals in the second half of the match. Colombia finished the tournament as champions as Rodallega became the tournament's all-time top goal scorer with a total of 11 goals in nine games, beating Luciano Galletti's record of nine goals. Rodallega was also selected for the FIFA U-20 World Cup, but failed to live up to expectations and was dropped from the team after the group stages as Colombia lost against Argentina in the second round.

Rodallega's senior international debut was in a friendly against Venezuela. He briefly played in goal during Colombia's final tournament game at the 2007 Copa América, when first string goalkeeper Róbinson Zapata was given a red card and Colombia had no more available substitutes. He was able to complete the game with Colombia winning 1–0.

== Career statistics ==
=== Club ===
As of match played 29 June 2025

Appearances and goals by club, season and competition
Club	Season	League			State league (Note: Includes Campeonato Baiano)		National cup (Note: Includes Copa MX, FA Cup, Turkish Cup, Copa do Brasil, Copa Colombia)		League cup (Note: Includes Football League Cup)		Continental		Other		Total	
Club	Season	Division	Apps	Goals	Apps	Goals	Apps	Goals	Apps	Goals	Apps	Goals	Apps	Goals	Apps	Goals
Deportes Quindío	2004	Primera A	31	13	–		–		–		–		–		31	13
Deportes Quindío	2005	Primera A	12	7	–		–		–		–		–		12	7
Deportes Quindío	Total		43	20	0	0	0	0	0	0	0	0	0	0	43	20
Deportivo Cali	2005	Primera A	26	12	–		–		–		2 (Note: Appearances in Copa Sudamericana)	0	–		28	12
Monterrey	2006 C	Primera División	14	3	–		–		–		–		–		14	3
Monterrey	2007 C	Primera División	15	1	–		3	0	–		–		–		18	1
Monterrey	Total		29	4	0	0	3	0	0	0	0	0	0	0	32	4
Atlas (loan)	2006 A	Primera División	17	5	–		–		–		–		–		17	5
Necaxa	2007 A	Primera División	16	9	–		–		–		–		–		16	9
Necaxa	2008 C	Primera División	20	7	–		–		–		–		–		20	7
Necaxa	2008 A	Primera División	17	9	–		–		–		–		–		17	9
Necaxa	Total		53	25	0	0	0	0	0	0	0	0	0	0	53	25
Wigan Athletic	2008–09	Premier League	14	3	–		0	0	0	0	–		–		15	3
Wigan Athletic	2009–10	Premier League	38	10	–		3	0	1	0	–		–		42	10
Wigan Athletic	2010–11	Premier League	36	9	–		0	0	1	0	–		–		37	9
Wigan Athletic	2011–12	Premier League	23	2	–		0	0	0	0	–		–		23	2
Wigan Athletic	Total		111	24	0	0	3	0	2	0	0	0	0	0	116	24
Fulham	2012–13	Premier League	29	3	–		3	0	1	0	–		–		33	3
Fulham	2013–14	Premier League	13	2	–		2	1	2	3	–		–		17	6
Fulham	2014–15	Championship	33	10	–		4	1	1	0	–		–		38	11
Fulham	Total		75	15	0	0	9	2	4	3	0	0	0	0	88	20
Akhisar Belediyespor	2015–16	Süper Lig	34	19	–		3	2	–		–		–		37	21
Akhisar Belediyespor	2016–17	Süper Lig	17	4	–		0	0	–		–		–		17	4
Akhisar Belediyespor	Total		51	23	0	0	3	2	0	0	0	0	0	0	54	25
Trabzonspor	2016–17	Süper Lig	15	6	–		–		–		–		–		15	6
Trabzonspor	2017–18	Süper Lig	23	5	–		5	8	–		–		–		28	13
Trabzonspor	2018–19	Süper Lig	33	15	–		4	1	–		–		–		37	16
Trabzonspor	Total		71	26	0	0	9	9	0	0	0	0	0	0	80	35
Denizlispor	2019–20	Süper Lig	31	6	–		1	0	–		–		–		32	6
Denizlispor	2020–21	Süper Lig	37	14	–		0	0	–		–		–		37	14
Denizlispor	Total		68	20	0	0	1	0	0	0	0	0	0	0	69	20
Bahia	2021	Série A	22	6	–		–		–		–		–		22	6
Bahia	2022	Série B	23	1	5	4	2	0	–		–		8 (Note: Appearances in Copa do Nordeste)	8	38	13
Bahia	Total		45	7	5	4	2	0	0	0	0	0	8	8	60	19
Santa Fe	2023	Primera A	30	12	–		3	0	–		6	3	–		39	15
Santa Fe	2024	Primera A	48	18	–		3	0	–		–		–		51	18
Santa Fe	2025	Primera A	26	16	–		–		–		2 (Note: Appearances in Copa Libertadores)	1	–		28	17
Santa Fe	Total		104	46	0	0	6	0	0	0	8	4	0	0	118	50
Career total			693	227	5	4	36	13	6	3	10	4	8	8	758	259

=== International ===
Appearances and goals by national team and year
National team	Year	Apps	Goals
Colombia	2005	1	0
Colombia	2006	5	1
Colombia	2007	11	3
Colombia	2008	7	3
Colombia	2009	7	1
Colombia	2010	4	0
Colombia	2011	8	0
Total		43	8

Scores and results list Colombia's goal tally first, score column indicates score after each Rodallega goal.

List of international goals scored by Hugo Rodallega
No.	Date	Venue	Opponent	Score	Result	Competition
1	4 June 2006	Camp Nou, Barcelona, Spain	Morocco	1–0	2–0	Friendly
2	7 February 2007	Estadio General Santander, Cúcuta, Colombia	Uruguay	1–2	1–3	Friendly
3	9 May 2007	Estadio Rommel Fernández, Panama City, Panama	Panama	3–0	4–0	Friendly
4	23 June 2007	Estadio Metropolitano, Barranquilla, Colombia	Ecuador	2–1	3–1	Friendly
5	30 April 2008	Estadio Alfonso Lopez, Bucaramanga, Colombia	Venezuela	1–0	5–2	Friendly
6	30 April 2008	Estadio Alfonso Lopez, Bucaramanga, Colombia	Venezuela	4–2	5–2	Friendly
7	14 June 2008	Estadio Monumental "U", Lima, Peru	Peru	1–0	1–1	2010 FIFA World Cup Qualifying
8	14 October 2009	Defensores del Chaco, Asunción, Paraguay	Paraguay	2–0	2–0	2010 FIFA World Cup Qualifying

== Honours ==
Deportivo Cali

- Primera A: 2005-II

Independiente Santa Fe

- Primera A: 2025-I

Colombia U20

- South American Youth Football Championship: 2005
