= Mustapha Yatabaré =

Malian footballer (born 1986)

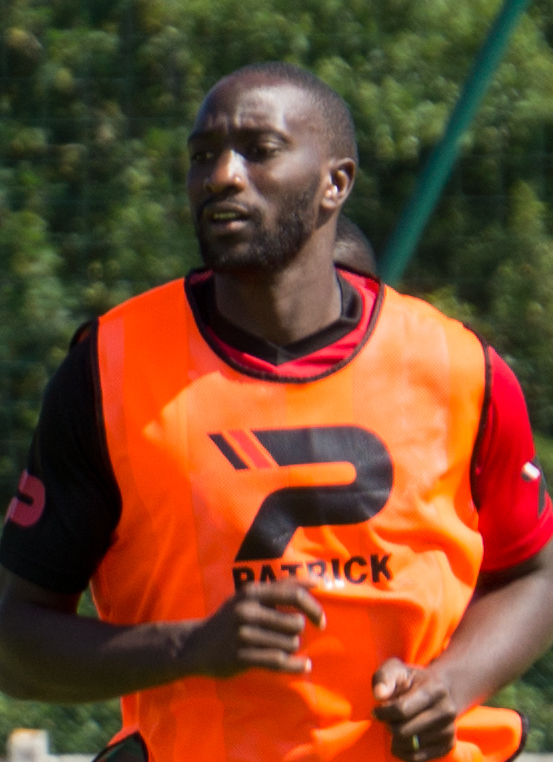
- Yatabaré with Guingamp in 2014

Personal information
- Full name: Mustapha Yatabaré
- Date of birth: 26 January 1986 (age 40)
- Place of birth: Beauvais, France
- Height: 1.86 m (6 ft 1 in)
- Position: Forward

Team information
- Current team: Boluspor (coach)

Youth career
- 2004–2005: AS Beauvais
- 2005–2006: Amiens

Senior career*
Years	Team	Apps	(Gls)
2006–2008	Villemomble Sports	53	(19)
2008–2010	Clermont	49	(14)
2010–2011	Boulogne	47	(3)
2011–2014	Guingamp	90	(33)
2014–2016	Trabzonspor	15	(1)
2015–2016	→ Montpellier (loan)	28	(4)
2016–2017	Karabükspor	41	(12)
2018–2019	Konyaspor	34	(5)
2019–2023	Sivasspor	122	(39)
2023–2025	Gençlerbirliği	39	(6)

International career
2009–2017	Mali	35	(7)

Managerial career
- 2025–2026: Gençlerbirliği (assistant)
- 2026: Boluspor
- * Club domestic league appearances and goals

Mustapha Yatabaré (born 26 January 1986) is a professional football coach and a former forward. He is the coach for TFF 1. Lig club Boluspor. Born in France, he played for the Mali national team.

== Club career ==
Yatabaré was born in the French town of Beauvais, and began his career at his hometown club AS Beauvais. He stayed at the club until 2005, before signing for Amiens SC, to be part of the youth system. In 2006, he joined Championnat National side Villemomble Sports, scoring eight goals in 25 appearances, before earning a move to Ligue 2 side Clermont Foot in 2008.

=== Boulogne ===
Yatabaré moved to Ligue 1 side US Boulogne in January 2010. They were relegated at the end of the season.

=== Guingamp ===
During the summer of 2011, Yatabaré moved to the Ligue 2 side En Avant de Guingamp. He did not score in his first season.

At the beginning of the 2012–13 season, he scored eight goals within the ten first games, including successive goals from the sixth to the tenth game. He finished that season as the Ligue 2 top scorer, with 23 goals, and contributed six assists. His goal-scoring exploits helped earn the Briton club promotion back into Ligue 1 after two years in the second division.

Yatabaré scored his first goal of the 2013–14 Ligue 1 season on the opening day of the campaign, but it came in a losing effort as Guingamp fell 3–1 to Marseille. He scored his sixth league goal on 25 January 2014 in Guingamp's 1–1 draw with reigning champions PSG.

In the quarter-finals of the Coupe de France on 26 March 2014, Yatabaré scored both goals in Guingamp's 2–0 victory over AS Cannes. On 16 April, Yatabaré scored twice against AS Monaco in the semi-finals of the Coupe de France as Guingamp won 3–1 in extra time to reach the final. In the final on 3 May, Yatabaré scored in the first minute of the second half, as Guingamp won 2–0 against Rennes. He headed in a cross from Steeven Langil for his eighth goal of the Coupe de France campaign, securing Guingamp's second Coupe de France championship.

On 2 August 2014, in the Trophée des Champions against Paris Saint-Germain at the Workers Stadium in Beijing, Yatabaré took a penalty in the 32nd minute after Claudio Beauvue had been fouled by Marquinhos. It was saved by Salvatore Sirigu and Guingamp lost 2–0.

=== Trabzonspor ===
On 1 September 2014, Yatabaré signed for Süper Lig side Trabzonspor on a three-year deal. The transfer fee paid to Guingamp was reported as €2.5 million.

=== Montpellier ===
After one season in Turkey, Yatabaré signed for Ligue 1 side Montpellier on a season-long loan deal, while Montpellier was given an option to sign him permanently.

=== Sivasspor ===
On 24 July 2019, Yatabaré left Konyaspor and signed a two-year contract with fellow Süper Lig club Sivasspor.

On 18 May 2021, Yatabaré extended his contract with Sivasspor for a further two years until the end of the 2022–23 season.

On 26 May 2022, Yatabaré started in the final of the Turkish Cup against Kayserispor. Sivasspor won 3–2 after extra time for their first Turkish Cup title. He finished the season as the club's top scorer with 12 goals.

He left the club on 1 July 2023 when his contract expired.

=== Gençlerbirliği ===
On 14 July 2023, Yatabaré joined Gençlerbirliği on an initial one-year deal with the club having an option to extend his contract for a further two seasons.

== International career ==
In November 2008, Yatabaré earned himself a call-up to the Mali national football team, following his impressive club displays. He made his international debut on 19 November 2008 against Algeria in Rouen, with the score finishing 1–1. On 10 January 2010, in the opening game of the 2010 African Cup of Nations, he scored a late equaliser as Mali came from 0–4 down to draw 4–4 with Angola. He also made the squad for the 2012 tournament, helping the team reach the semi-finals and third place.

== Personal life ==
Yatabaré was born in France to a Malian father and Senegalese mother. He holds both French and Malian nationalities. His younger brother, Sambou, is also a professional footballer.

== Career statistics ==
=== Club ===
As of match played 24 April 2023

Appearances and goals by club, season and competition
Club	Season	League			National cup (Note: Includes Coupe de France, Turkish Cup)		League cup (Note: Includes Coupe de la Ligue)		Europe		Other		Total	
Club	Season	Division	Apps	Goals	Apps	Goals	Apps	Goals	Apps	Goals	Apps	Goals	Apps	Goals
Clermont	2008–09	Ligue 2	31	9	0	0	0	0	–		–		31	9
Clermont	2009–10	Ligue 2	18	5	0	0	2	0	–		–		18	5
Clermont	Total		49	14	0	0	2	0	–		–		51	14
Boulogne	2009–10	Ligue 1	17	2	4	0	0	0	–		–		21	2
Boulogne	2010–11	Ligue 2	30	1	2	2	1	0	–		–		33	3
Boulogne	Total		47	3	6	2	1	0	–		–		54	5
Guingamp	2011–12	Ligue 2	20	0	1	0	0	0	–		–		21	0
Guingamp	2012–13	Ligue 2	35	22	1	0	1	0	–		–		37	22
Guingamp	2013–14	Ligue 1	31	11	6	8	1	1	–		–		38	20
Guingamp	2014–15	Ligue 1	4	0	0	0	0	0	–		1 (Note: Appearance in Trophée des Champions)	0	5	0
Guingamp	Total		90	33	8	8	2	1	–		1	0	101	42
Trabzonspor	2014–15	Süper Lig	15	1	4	3	–		6 (Note: Appearances in UEFA Europa League)	1	–		25	5
Montpellier (loan)	2015–16	Ligue 1	28	4	2	1	1	0	–		–		31	5
Kardemir Karabükspor	2016–17	Süper Lig	26	6	0	0	–		–		–		26	6
Kardemir Karabükspor	2018–19	Süper Lig	15	6	0	0	–		–		–		15	6
Kardemir Karabükspor	Total		41	12	0	0	–		–		–		41	12
Konyaspor	2017–18	Süper Lig	5	0	1	0	–		–		–		6	0
Konyaspor	2018–19	Süper Lig	29	5	0	0	–		–		–		29	5
Konyaspor	Total		34	5	1	0	–		–		–		35	5
Sivasspor	2019–20	Süper Lig	31	13	4	1	–		–		–		35	14
Sivasspor	2020–21	Süper Lig	31	10	2	1	–		5	1	–		38	12
Sivasspor	2021–22	Süper Lig	32	10	3	2	–		6 (Note: Appearances in UEFA Europa Conference League)	0	–		41	12
Sivasspor	2022–23	Süper Lig	24	6	1	3	–		8 (Note: Two appearances in UEFA Europa League, six appearances and three goals in UEFA Europa Conference League)	3	1 (Note: Appearance in Turkish Super Cup)	0	34	12
Sivasspor	Total		118	39	10	7	–		19	4	1	0	148	50
Career total			422	111	31	21	6	1	25	5	2	0	486	138

=== International ===
Scores and results list Mali's goal tally first.

Goal	Date	Venue	Opponent	Score	Result	Competition
1.	11 February 2009	Parc des Cosmonautes, Bois-Guillaume, France	Angola	2–0	4–0	Friendly
2.	30 December 2009	Suheim Bin Hamad Stadium, Doha, Qatar	Iran	1–1	2–1	Friendly
3.	10 January 2010	Estádio 11 de Novembro, Luanda, Angola	Angola	4–4	4–4	2010 Africa Cup of Nations
4.	15 October 2014	Stade du 26 Mars, Bamako, Mali	Ethiopia	2–2	2–3	2015 Africa Cup of Nations qualification
5.	19 November 2014	Stade du 26 Mars, Bamako, Mali	Algeria	2–0	2–0	2015 Africa Cup of Nations qualification
6.	28 March 2016	Estadio de Malabo, Malabo, Equatorial Guinea	Equatorial Guinea	1–0	1–0	2017 Africa Cup of Nations qualification
7.	7 January 2017	Stade de Marrakech, Marrakesh, Morocco	Burkina Faso	1–2	1–2	Friendly

== Honours ==
Guingamp

- Coupe de France: 2013–14

Sivasspor

- Turkish Cup: 2021–22

Mali

- Africa Cup of Nations bronze: 2012

Individual

- Ligue 2 UNFP Team of the Year: 2012–13
- Ligue 2 Top scorer: 2012–13
