= Hakan Arslan (footballer, born 1989) =

Turkish footballer (born 1989)

Personal information
- Date of birth: 12 March 1989 (age 37)
- Place of birth: Osmangazi, Turkey
- Height: 1.78 m (5 ft 10 in)
- Position: Left-back

Team information
- Current team: Doğugücü FK

Youth career
- 2001–2012: Yeşil Bursa

Senior career*
| Years | Team | Apps | (Gls) |
| 2008–2011 | Yeşil Bursa | 90 | (9) |
| 2011–2014 | Boluspor | 82 | (1) |
| 2014–2015 | Şanlıurfaspor | 26 | (0) |
| 2015–2016 | Göztepe | 25 | (0) |
| 2016–2017 | Boluspor | 14 | (0) |
| 2017–2019 | BB Erzurumspor | 40 | (1) |
| 2019–2020 | Boluspor | 10 | (1) |
| 2020–2021 | Kırklarelispor | 10 | (0) |
| 2021–2022 | Karacabey Belediyespor | 27 | (0) |
| 2022– | Doğugücü FK | | |

International career^{‡}
| 2007 | Turkey U18 | 1 | (0) |
- * Club domestic league appearances and goals ‡ National team caps and goals as of 7 May 2022

Hakan Arslan (born 12 March 1989) is a Turkish professional footballer who plays as a left-back for the amateur side Doğugücü FK.

== Professional career ==
Arslan made his professional debut with Erzurumspor in a 3-2 Süper Lig loss to Konyaspor on 12 August 2018.
