= Zakarya Bergdich =

Footballer (born 1989)

Personal information
- Full name: Zakarya Bergdich
- Date of birth: 7 January 1989 (age 37)
- Place of birth: Compiègne, France
- Height: 1.78 m (5 ft 10 in)
- Position: Left-back

Youth career
- 2004–2007: Strasbourg
- 2007–2009: Créteil-Lusitanos

Senior career*
Years	Team	Apps	(Gls)
2009–2010	Alfortville	31	(1)
2010–2013	Lens	51	(1)
2013–2015	Valladolid	39	(5)
2015	→ Genoa (loan)	11	(0)
2015–2016	Charlton Athletic	23	(0)
2016–2017	Córdoba	20	(0)
2017–2018	Sochaux	25	(0)
2018–2019	Belenenses SAD	25	(0)
2019–2021	Denizlispor	39	(0)
2021	BB Erzurumspor	6	(0)
2022–2023	Erzurumspor	7	(0)

International career^{‡}
2011	Morocco U23	8	(0)
2012–	Morocco	11	(0)
- * Club domestic league appearances and goals as of 12 June 2023 ‡ National team caps and goals as of 30 March 2017

Zakarya Bergdich (Arabic: زكرياء برݣديش; born 7 January 1989) is a professional footballer who plays as a left-back. Born in France, he represents Morocco at full international level, and played at the 2012 Summer Olympics.

== Club career ==
Bergdich started his career at UJA Alfortville, and went on to represent RC Lens in his country. In 2013, he moved abroad, signing for Real Valladolid.

On 23 July 2015, Bergdich joined Charlton from Valladolid for an undisclosed fee, signing a four-year deal. He scored his first goal for the club in a 4–1 League Cup win over Dagenham & Redbridge on 11 August 2015.

On 28 August 2016, Bergdich returned to Spain, signing a one-year contract with Córdoba CF.

== Career statistics ==
As of match played 1 July 2018

Appearances and goals by club, season and competition
Club	Season	League			National Cup		League Cup		Other		Total	
Club	Season	Division	Apps	Goals	Apps	Goals	Apps	Goals	Apps	Goals	Apps	Goals
Alfortville	2009–10	CFA	31	1	0	0	—		—		31	1
Lens II	2010–11	CFA	27	0	—		—		—		27	0
Lens II	2011–12	CFA	5	0	—		—		—		5	0
Lens II	2012–13	CFA	1	0	—		—		—		1	0
Lens II	Total		33	0	—		—		0	0	33	0
Lens	2010–11	Ligue 1	2	0	0	0	0	0	—		2	0
Lens	2011–12	Ligue 2	25	0	0	0	2	0	—		27	0
Lens	2012–13	Ligue 2	24	1	2	1	0	0	—		26	2
Lens	Total		51	1	2	1	2	0	0	0	55	2
Real Valladolid	2013–14	La Liga	22	0	2	0	—		—		24	0
Real Valladolid	2014–15	Segunda División	17	5	2	0	—		—		19	5
Real Valladolid	Total		39	5	4	0	—		0	0	43	5
Genoa (loan)	2014–15	Serie A	11	0	0	0	—		—		11	0
Charlton Athletic	2015–16	Championship	23	0	0	0	3	1	—		26	1
Córdoba	2016–17	Segunda División	20	0	1	0	—		—		21	0
Sochaux	2017–18	Ligue 2	25	0	3	0	1	0	—		29	0
Career total			233	7	10	1	6	1	0	0	249	9

== Honours ==
Morocco U23

- CAF U-23 Championship runner-up: 2011
