= Yasir Subaşı =

Turkish footballer

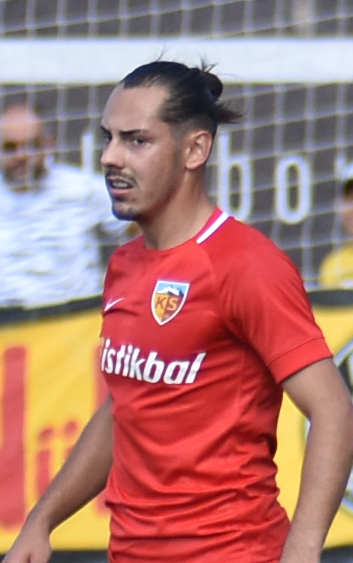
- Subaşı in 2021

Personal information
- Full name: Karahan Yasir Subaşı
- Date of birth: 1 January 1996 (age 30)
- Place of birth: Adapazarı, Turkey
- Height: 1.80 m (5 ft 11 in)
- Position: Left back

Team information
- Current team: Batman Petrolspor
- Number: 3

Youth career
- 2007–2010: Sakaryaspor
- 2011–2016: Fenerbahçe

Senior career*
Years	Team	Apps	(Gls)
2016–2018	Fenerbahçe	0	(0)
2016–2017	→ Bağcılarspor (loan)	32	(1)
2017–2018	→ Sakaryaspor (loan)	38	(1)
2018–2019	Ümraniyespor	14	(0)
2019–2022	Kayserispor	49	(0)
2022–2026	Konyaspor	27	(0)
2026–	Batman Petrolspor	10	(1)

International career^{‡}
2012	Turkey U16	2	(0)
- * Club domestic league appearances and goals as of 18 October 2026 ‡ National team caps and goals as of 15 October 2022

Karahan Yasir Subaşı (born 1 January 1996) is a Turkish professional footballer who plays as a left back for TFF 1. Lig club Batman Petrolspor.

== Professional career ==
A youth product of Fenerbahçe, Subaşı spent his early professional career on loan before transferring to Kayserispor on 12 July 2019. Subaşı made his professional debut with Kayserispor in a 1-1 Süper Lig tie with MKE Ankaragücü on 24 August 2019.

On 12 June 2022, Subaşı signed a three-year contract with Konyaspor.
