= Tiago Lopes =

Portuguese footballer

Personal information
- Full name: Tiago Jorge Oliveira Lopes
- Date of birth: 4 January 1989 (age 37)
- Place of birth: Vila Nova de Gaia, Portugal
- Height: 1.78 m (5 ft 10 in)
- Position: Right-back

Youth career
- 2000–2005: Coimbrões
- 2005–2006: Padroense
- 2006–2008: Candal

Senior career*
Years	Team	Apps	(Gls)
2008–2010	Valle d'Aosta	25	(2)
2010–2011	Espinho	24	(2)
2011–2012	Tondela	5	(0)
2012–2013	Trofense	29	(2)
2013–2014	Covilhã	20	(0)
2014–2017	CFR Cluj	88	(4)
2017–2019	Kayserispor	58	(0)
2019–2021	Denizlispor	47	(0)
2022	Denizlispor	13	(2)
2022–2023	Covilhã	6	(0)
Total		315	(12)

International career
2008	Portugal U19	2	(0)
- * Club domestic league appearances and goals

Tiago Jorge Oliveira Lopes (born 4 January 1989) is a Portuguese former professional footballer who played as a right-back.

== Club career ==
Born in Vila Nova de Gaia, Porto District, Lopes started his senior career in Italian amateur football. Returned to his country in 2010, he then spent one season apiece in the third division with Espinho and Tondela.

In the summer of 2012, Lopes signed with Segunda Liga club Trofense. He played his first game as a professional on 12 August, featuring the full 90 minutes in a 2–0 away loss against Aves.

Lopes joined fellow second-tier side Covilhã for the 2013–14 campaign. On 19 January 2014, as his contract was about to expire, the 25-year-old moved abroad after agreeing to a two-and-a-half-year deal at CFR Cluj in the Romanian Liga I. He scored his first top-flight goal on 29 September 2014, the game's only in a home win over Universitatea Cluj.

In July 2017, Lopes moved on a free transfer to Kayserispor in Turkey's Süper Lig, on a one-year deal with the option of a second. After two years of regular game time, he transferred to Denizlispor in the same competition, on a contract of the same length.

Lopes returned to Covilhã on 6 October 2022. He severed his ties only three months later, however, due to personal problems.

== Personal life ==
Lopes's twin brother, Hélder, was also a footballer and a defender.

== Honours ==
CFR Cluj

- Cupa României: 2015–16
