= Tolgahan Acar =

Turkish professional footballer

Personal information
- Date of birth: 4 June 1986 (age 40)
- Place of birth: Adana, Turkey
- Height: 1.85 m (6 ft 1 in)
- Position: Goalkeeper

Team information
- Current team: Adana 1954 FK

Youth career
- 1999–2001: Çukurova Üniversitesi
- 2001–2002: Adana Gençlerbirliği
- 2002–2004: Adanaspor
- 2004–2006: Gaziantepspor

Senior career*
Years	Team	Apps	(Gls)
2002–2004	Adanaspor	2	(0)
2004–2009	Gaziantepspor	4	(0)
2006–2008	→ Adanaspor (loan)	33	(0)
2009–2014	Adanaspor	91	(0)
2014	→ Göztepe (loan)	16	(0)
2014–2016	Altınordu	55	(0)
2016–2019	Sivasspor	56	(0)
2019–2020	Denizlispor	5	(0)
2020–2022	Giresunspor	16	(0)
2022	Şanlıurfaspor	12	(0)
2022–	Adana 1954 FK	0	(0)

International career
2003–2004	Turkey U18	10	(0)
2004	Turkey U19	2	(0)
2005	Turkey U20	1	(0)
- * Club domestic league appearances and goals as of 4 September 2022

Tolgahan Acar (born 4 June 1986) is a Turkish professional footballer who plays as a goalkeeper for the TFF Third League side Adana 1954 FK. He has been capped at youth level for the U-18, U-19 and U-20 Turkey squads.

== Early career ==
Acar was born in Adana. He attended and played football for the Çukurova Üniversitesi team. He moved to Adanaspor in 2002. In his first stint at the club, Acar was capped twice, spending the brunt of his time with the youth team. Gaziantepspor transferred him in 2004, but he did not feature for the club regularly.

Instead, Acar spent most of his time at the club either with the youth team or on loan at Adanaspor. Adanaspor transferred him at the beginning of the 2009 season. Acar was the starting goalkeeper for the Toros Kaplanları, playing in 32 matches in the 2009–10 season.
