= 2018–19 Denizlispor season =

Denizlispor
2018–19 season
- Chairman: Mustafa Üstek (until 30 October 2018); Ali Çetin
- Manager: Osman Özköylü (until 6 October 2018); Yücel İldiz (from 12 October 2018)
- Stadium: Denizli Atatürk Stadium
- TFF First League: 1st (promoted)
- Turkish Cup: Fourth round
- Top goalscorer: League: Mehmet Akyüz (15); All: Mehmet Akyüz (15)
- Highest home attendance: vs. Kardemir Karabükspor (12 May 2019)
Home colours	Away colours	Third colours

The 2018–19 season was the 52nd season of Denizlispor in existence and the club's 34th season in the TFF First League. In addition to the domestic league, Denizlispor participated in this season's edition of the Turkish Cup. The season covers the period from July 2018 to 30 June 2019.

On 12 May 2019, Denizlispor secured promotion back to the Süper Lig following a 6–0 home win over Kardemir Karabükspor. With a 5–2 away win over İstanbulspor on 18 May 2019, Denizlispor were confirmed as champions.

== Transfers ==
=== In ===
In	Transfer fee	From
Summer
(Turkey) Ramazan Ergut	End of loan	(Turkey) Silivrispor
(Turkey) Şevki Çınar	End of loan	(Turkey) Kastamonuspor 1966
(Turkey) Muhammed Ertürk	Free	(Turkey) Gazişehir Gaziantep
(Turkey) Gökhan Süzen	Free	(Turkey) Adanaspor
(Turkey) Burak Çalık	Free	(Turkey) Balıkesirspor
(Turkey) Deniz Vural	Free	(Turkey) Altınordu
(Turkey) Abdülkerim Bardakcı	Loan	(Turkey) Konyaspor
(Turkey) Seddar Karaman	Loan	(Turkey) Konyaspor
(Cameroon) Kibong Mbamba	Free	(Turkey) MKE Ankaragücü
(Turkey) Alperen Babacan	Loan	(Turkey) Akhisar Belediyespor
(Poland) Adam Stachowiak	Free	(Turkey) Gazişehir Gaziantep
(Turkey) Recep Niyaz	Free	(Turkey) Çaykur Rizespor
(Turkey) Furkan Şeker	Free	(Turkey) Boluspor
(Liberia) Tonia Tisdell	Free	(Turkey) Osmanlıspor
(Turkey) Mehmet Taş	Free	(Turkey) Gençlerbirliği
(Nigeria) Gbolahan Salami	Free	(Kazakhstan) FC Irtysh
Winter
(Nigeria) Lanre Kehinde	Free	(Turkey) MKE Ankaragücü
(Turkey) Oğuz Yılmaz	Free	(Turkey) Balıkesirspor
(Netherlands) Bilal Ould-Chikh	Free	(Netherlands) Utrecht

=== Out ===
Out	Transfer fee	To
Summer
(Turkey) Atakan Üner	Free	(Turkey) Altınordu
(Turkey) Canberk Aydın	End of loan	(Turkey) Kayserispor
(Nigeria) Patrick Friday Eze	End of loan	(Turkey) Konyaspor
(Serbia) Darko Lazić	End of loan	(Turkey) Alanyaspor
(Turkey) Hasan Kılıç	End of loan	(Turkey) Osmanlıspor
(Turkey) Alperen Babacan	End of loan	(Turkey) Akhisar Belediyespor
(Netherlands) Leandro Kappel	Free	(Turkey) Altay
(Turkey) Şevki Çınar	Free	(Turkey) Altınordu
(Turkey) Batıcan Aday	Free	(Turkey) Erokspor
(Turkey) İsmail Odabaşı	Free	(Turkey) Boluspor
(Turkey) Ömer Kulga	Free	(Turkey) Manisa BB
(Turkey) Şefik Can Erel	Free	(Turkey) Gebzespor
(Turkey) Barış Örücü	Free	(Turkey) İstanbulspor
(Turkey) Berkan Afşarlı	Free	(Turkey) Pendikspor
(Turkey) Emre Sağlık	Free	(Turkey) Kızılcabölükspor
(Azerbaijan) Taşkın İlter	Free	(Turkey) Kardemir Karabükspor
(Turkey) Alperen Yazıcı	Free	(Turkey) Hekimoğlu Trabzon
(Turkey) Ramazan Ergut	Free	(Turkey) Bağcılarspor
Winter
(Turkey) Mehmet Taş	Free	(Turkey) Giresunspor
(Turkey) Cenk Güvenç	Free	(Turkey) Afjet Afyonspor
(Liberia) Tonia Tisdell	Free	(Cyprus) Nea Salamis Ammohostu
(Turkey) Cihan Özkaymak	Free	(Turkey) Bandırmaspor

== Squad ==
N	Pos.	Nat.	Name	Age	EU	Since	App	Goals	Ends	Transfer fee	Notes
1	GK	(Turkey)	Hüseyin Altıntaş	24	Non-EU	2017	2	0	2020	Free	
3	DF	(Turkey)	Alperen Babacan	21	Non-EU	2018	92	8	2019	Free	Originally from youth system
4	DF	(Turkey)	Taha Can Velioğlu	25	Non-EU	2016	52	2	2019	Free	
5	MF	(Turkey)	Deniz Vural	30	EU	2018	27	1	2019	Free	Second nationality: German
6	DF	(Turkey)	Gökhan Süzen	31	Non-EU	2018	19	0	2019	Free	
7	MF	(Turkey)	Ziya Alkurt	28	Non-EU	2016	89	26	2019	Free	
10	MF	(Morocco)	Ismaïl Aissati	30	EU	2018 (Winter)	46	3	2019	€60K	Second nationality: Dutch
15	DF	(Turkey)	Oğuz Yılmaz	26	Non-EU	2019 (Winter)	10	0	2020	Free	
17	FW	(Turkey)	Mehmet Akyüz (Captain)	33	Non-EU	2018 (Winter)	49	27	2020	Free	
20	MF	(Turkey)	Recep Niyaz	23	Non-EU	2018	62	20	2021	Free	Originally from youth system
23	DF	(Turkey)	Burak Altıparmak	28	Non-EU	2016	90	0	2020	Free	Second nationality: German
24	FW	(Turkey)	Burak Çalık	30	Non-EU	2018	33	10	2019	Free	
27	DF	(Turkey)	Furkan Şeker	27	Non-EU	2018	88	1	2019	Free	
33	GK	(Poland)	Adam Stachowiak	32	EU	2018	32	0	2019	Free	
34	MF	(Netherlands)	Bilal Ould-Chikh	21	EU	2019 (Winter)	0	0	2019	Free	Second nationality: Moroccan
39	DF	(Turkey)	Kerem Can Akyüz	29	Non-EU	2016	88	2	2019	Free	
42	DF	(Turkey)	Abdülkerim Bardakcı	24	Non-EU	2018	32	2	2019	Free	
45	GK	(Turkey)	Asil Kaan Güler	25	Non-EU	2015	52	0	2019	Youth system	
46	MF	(Cameroon)	Marc Kibong Mbamba	30	Non-EU	2018	22	0	2019	Free	
71	MF	(Turkey)	Himmet Ertürk	25	Non-EU	2018	38	1	2020	Free	
77	MF	(Turkey)	Asım Aksungur	18	Non-EU	2018	2	0	2021	Youth system	
90	FW	(Nigeria)	Lanre Kehinde	25	Non-EU	2019 (Winter)	15	10	2019	Free	
99	FW	(Turkey)	Seddar Karaman	25	Non-EU	2018	12	10	2019	Free	
Players sold or loaned out after the start of the season
8	MF	(Turkey)	Cihan Özkaymak	29	Non-EU	2013	101	10	2019	Free	
13	MF	(Liberia)	Tonia Tisdell	27	Non-EU	2018	12	0	2019	Free	
22	DF	(Turkey)	Mehmet Taş	28	Non-EU	2018	4	0	2019	Free	
29	DF	(Turkey)	Cenk Güvenç	27	EU	2015	83	1	2020	Free	Second nationality: German

- Last updated: 18 May 2019
- Source: Denizlispor.org.tr
- Ordered by squad number.

== Statistics ==
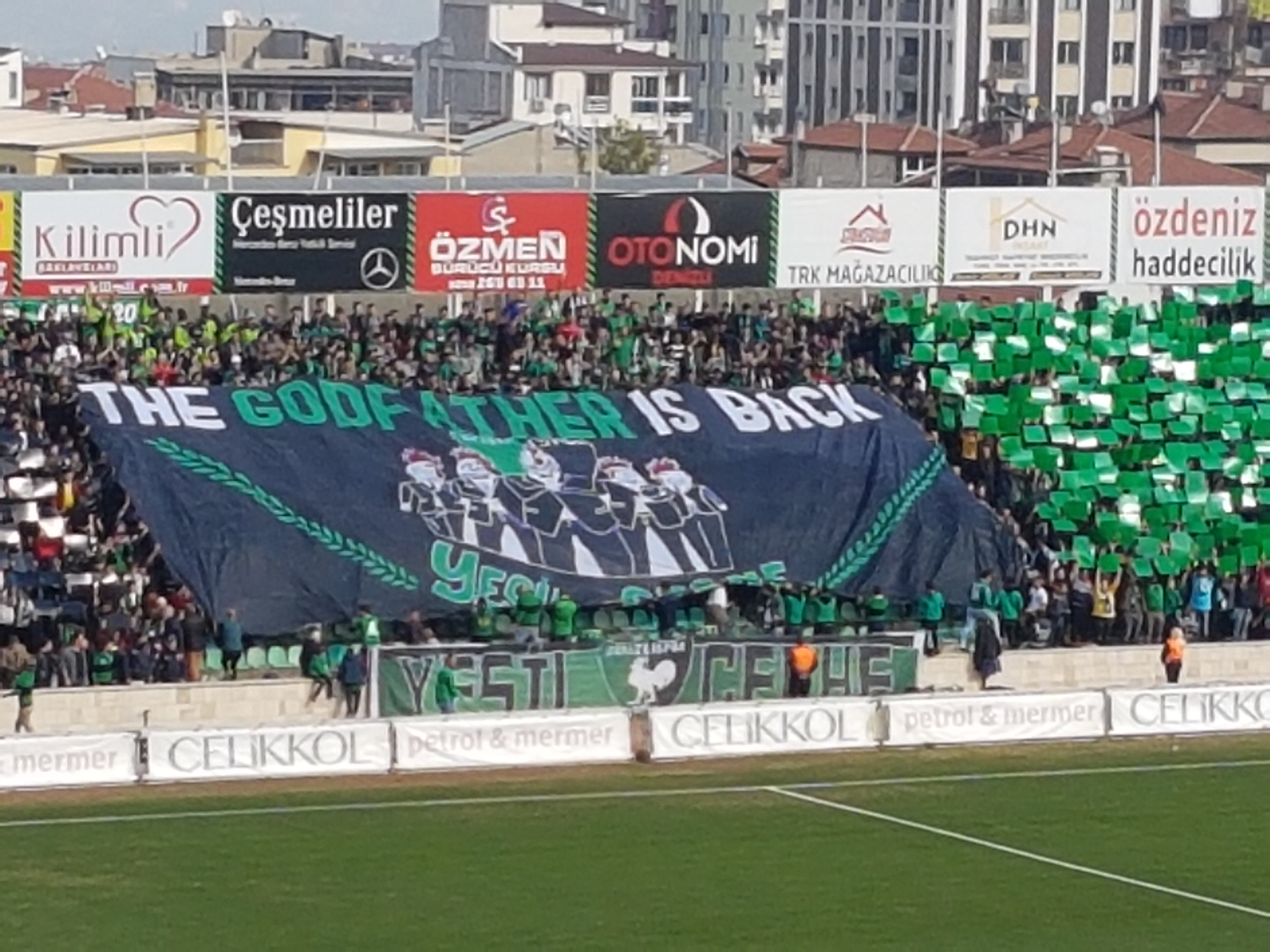
Tifo made by fans unveiled in the home game against Giresunspor on 25 November 2018.

No.	PMF.	Nat.	Player	TFF First League						Turkish Cup						Total					
No.	PMF.	Nat.	Player	Ap	G	A	Booked	(yellow card) (red card)	Sent off (straight red)	Ap	G	A	Booked	(yellow card) (red card)	Sent off (straight red)	Ap	G	A	Booked	(yellow card) (red card)	Sent off (straight red)
1	GK	(Turkey)	Hüseyin Altıntaş	-	-	-	-	-	-	1	-	-	-	-	-	1	-	-	-	-	-
3	DF	(Turkey)	Alperen Babacan	30	2	2	6	-	1	1	1	-	-	-	-	31	3	2	6	-	1
4	DF	(Turkey)	Taha Can Velioğlu	12	1	1	2	-	-	1	-	-	-	-	-	13	1	1	2	-	-
5	MF	(Turkey)	Deniz Vural	27	1	1	6	-	-	-	-	-	-	-	-	27	1	1	6	-	-
6	DF	(Turkey)	Gökhan Süzen	17	-	-	2	-	-	2	-	-	1	-	-	19	-	-	3	-	-
7	MF	(Turkey)	Ziya Alkurt	28	10	5	4	-	1	-	-	-	-	-	-	28	10	5	4	-	1
10	MF	(Morocco)	Ismaïl Aissati	33	3	7	7	-	-	-	-	-	-	-	-	33	3	7	7	-	-
15	DF	(Turkey)	Oğuz Yılmaz	10	-	-	1	-	-	-	-	-	-	-	-	10	-	-	1	-	-
17	FW	(Turkey)	Mehmet Akyüz (captain)	34	15	5	3	-	-	-	-	-	-	-	-	34	15	5	3	-	-
20	MF	(Turkey)	Recep Niyaz	33	12	6	4	-	-	2	-	-	-	-	-	35	12	6	4	-	-
23	DF	(Turkey)	Burak Altıparmak	27	-	1	2	-	-	2	-	-	-	-	-	29	-	1	2	-	-
24	FW	(Turkey)	Burak Çalık	32	9	5	3	-	-	1	1	-	-	-	-	33	10	5	3	-	-
27	DF	(Turkey)	Furkan Şeker	15	-	5	3	-	-	2	-	-	1	-	-	17	-	5	4	-	-
33	GK	(Poland)	Adam Stachowiak	32	-	-	2	-	-	-	-	-	-	-	-	32	-	-	2	-	-
34	MF	(Netherlands)	Bilal Ould-Chikh	-	-	-	-	-	-	-	-	-	-	-	-	-	-	-	-	-	-
39	DF	(Turkey)	Kerem Can Akyüz	32	1	2	5	-	-	-	-	-	-	-	-	32	1	2	5	-	-
42	DF	(Turkey)	Abdülkerim Bardakcı	32	2	1	5	-	-	-	-	-	-	-	-	32	2	1	5	-	-
45	GK	(Turkey)	Asil Kaan Güler	2	-	-	1	-	-	1	-	-	-	-	-	3	-	-	1	-	-
46	MF	(Cameroon)	Marc Kibong Mbamba	21	-	1	3	1	-	1	-	-	-	-	-	22	-	1	3	1	-
71	MF	(Turkey)	Himmet Ertürk	14	-	-	2	-	-	2	1	-	-	-	-	16	1	-	2	-	-
77	MF	(Turkey)	Asım Aksungur	-	-	-	-	-	-	2	-	-	-	-	-	2	-	-	-	-	-
90	FW	(Nigeria)	Lanre Kehinde	15	10	1	3	-	-	-	-	-	-	-	-	15	10	1	3	-	-
99	FW	(Turkey)	Seddar Karaman	11	-	-	-	-	-	1	-	-	-	-	-	12	-	-	-	-	-
8	MF	(Turkey)	Cihan Özkaymak	5	-	1	-	-	-	2	-	-	-	-	-	7	-	1	-	-	-
13	MF	(Liberia)	Tonia Tisdell	10	-	1	-	-	-	2	-	-	-	-	-	12	-	1	-	-	-
22	DF	(Turkey)	Mehmet Taş	2	-	-	-	-	-	2	-	-	-	-	-	4	-	-	-	-	-
29	DF	(Turkey)	Cenk Güvenç	1	-	-	-	-	-	2	-	-	1	-	-	3	-	-	1	-	-

== Friendlies ==
=== Pre-season ===
18 July 2018 Friendly	Denizlispor (Turkey)	3 – 0	(Iran) Tractor Sazi	Ankara
17:30 TRT (UTC+3)				Stadium: Kızılcahamam Country Stadium

24 July 2018 Friendly	Denizlispor	0 – 1	İstanbulspor	Ankara
18:00 TRT (UTC+3)				Stadium: Kızılcahamam Country Stadium

27 July 2018 Friendly	Denizlispor	0 – 2	Alanyaspor	Düzce
16:00 TRT (UTC+3)			32' Lucas Villafáñez; 51' Bobô	Stadium: Topuk Yaylası Facilities

4 August 2018 Friendly	Denizlispor	0 – 2	Afjet Afyonspor	Denizli
19:00 TRT (UTC+3)			65' Mendy	Stadium: Denizli Atatürk Stadium

=== Mid-season ===
5 January 2019 Friendly	Denizlispor	3 – 2	Gümüşhanespor	Antalya
16:00 TRT (UTC+3)	Abdülkerim Bardakcı 29'; Mehmet Akyüz 40'; Recep Niyaz 83'		43' Murat Kayalı; 84' (pen.) Serdar Ümit Deniz	Stadium: Kremlin Otel Football Center

8 January 2019 Friendly	Denizlispor	0 – 1	Yeni Malatyaspor	Antalya
16:00 TRT (UTC+3)			83' Robin Yalçın	Stadium: Kremlin Otel Football Center

12 January 2019 Friendly	Denizlispor	1 – 2	Çaykur Rizespor	Antalya
13:00 TRT (UTC+3)	Recep Niyaz 24'		51' (pen.) Vedat Muriqi; 77' Eren Karadağ	Stadium: Titanic Belek Football Center

27 March 2019 Friendly	Denizlispor	1 – 0	Göztepe	Denizli
19:00 TRT (UTC+3)	Ziya Alkurt 32'			Stadium: Atatürk Stadium

== Competitions ==
=== Overview ===
Competition	First match	Last match	Starting round	Final position	Record							
Competition	First match	Last match	Starting round	Final position	Pld	W	D	L	GF	GA	GD	Win %
TFF First League	12 August 2018	18 May 2019	Matchday 1	Winners	34	21	9	4	67	32	+35	61.76
Turkish Cup	25 September 2018	30 October 2018	Third round	Fourth round	2	1	0	1	3	3	+0	50.00
Total					36	22	9	5	70	35	+35	61.11

Source: Competitions

=== TFF First League ===
==== League table ====
Pos	Team	Pld	W	D	L	GF	GA	GD	Pts	Qualification or relegation
1	Denizlispor (C, P)	34	21	9	4	67	32	+35	72	Promotion to the Süper Lig
2	Gençlerbirliği (P)	34	22	4	8	50	28	+22	70	Promotion to the Süper Lig
3	Hatayspor	34	19	10	5	57	22	+35	67	Qualification for the Süper Lig Playoffs
4	Osmanlıspor	34	19	5	10	49	26	+23	62	Qualification for the Süper Lig Playoffs
5	Gazişehir Gaziantep (P)	34	17	8	9	60	31	+29	59	Qualification for the Süper Lig Playoffs

Source: TFF
Rules for classification: 1) Points; 2) Head-to-head points; 3) Head-to-head goal difference; 4) Head-to-head goals scored; 5) Goal difference; 6) Goals scored
(C) Champions; (P) Promoted

==== Results summary ====
Overall								Home						Away					
Pld	W	D	L	GF	GA	GD	Pts	W	D	L	GF	GA	GD	W	D	L	GF	GA	GD
34	21	9	4	67	32	+35	72	9	6	2	33	12	+21	12	3	2	34	20	+14

Source: TFF.org

==== Results by round ====
Round	1	2	3	4	5	6	7	8	9	10	11	12	13	14	15	16	17	18	19	20	21	22	23	24	25	26	27	28	29	30	31	32	33	34
Ground	H	A	H	A	H	A	H	A	H	A	H	A	H	A	H	A	H	A	H	A	H	A	H	A	H	A	H	A	H	A	H	A	H	A
Result	L	W	D	L	W	W	W	L	W	W	W	W	W	D	D	W	W	W	W	D	W	D	L	W	D	W	W	W	D	W	D	W	W	W
Position	13	10	9	13	8	6	4	6	3	3	3	3	2	2	2	2	2	2	1	1	1	1	2	1	1	1	1	1	2	2	2	2	2	1

Source: TFF.org
A = Away; H = Home; W = Win; D = Draw; L = Loss

==== Matches ====
Win Draw Loss

12 August 2018 1	Denizlispor	0–1	Gazişehir Gaziantep	Denizli
21:45 TRT (UTC+3)	Burak Çalık (yellow card) 55'; Himmet Ertürk (yellow card) 57'; Ismaïl Aissati (yellow card) 87'	Report	79' Mehmet Erdem Uğurlu; (yellow card) 80' Muhammed Enes Durmuş	Stadium: Atatürk Stadium; Referee: Onur Özütoprak; Assistant referees: Bilal Gölen, Mehmet Emin Tuğral; Fourth official: Çağdaş Altay

19 August 2018 2	Adana Demirspor	0–1	Denizlispor	Adana
19:15 TRT (UTC+3)	Milan Mitrović (yellow card) 19'; Jakub Kosecki (yellow card) 83'; Galip Güzel (yellow card) 84'	Report	(yellow card) 30' Kerem Can Akyüz; (yellow card) 45' Alperen Babacan; (yellow card) 78' Gökhan Süzen; 82' Burak Çalık	Stadium: 5 Ocak Stadium; Referee: Atilla Karaoğlan; Assistant referees: Mehmet Ali Akkor, Cemil Tunç; Fourth official: Burak Taşkınsoy

25 August 2018 3	Denizlispor	0–0	Hatayspor	Denizli
21:45 TRT (UTC+3)	Kerem Can Akyüz (yellow card) 11'; Ismaïl Aissati (yellow card) 70'; Deniz Vural (yellow card) 78'	Report	(yellow card) 57' Tom; (yellow card) 63' Murat Paluli	Stadium: Atatürk Stadium; Referee: Yasin Kol; Assistant referees: Erkan Akbulut, Mehmet Kağan Birgül; Fourth official: Mustafa Aydın

2 September 2018 4	Altınordu	4–0	Denizlispor	İzmir
21:45 TRT (UTC+3)	Hüseyin Üner 13'; Serdar Deliktaş 20' (pen.); Oğulcan Ülgün (yellow card) 30'; Muhammed Mert 49'; Anıl Koç 59'; Kemal Rüzgar (yellow card) 64'; Murat Uçar (yellow card) 82'	Report	(red card) 18' Alperen Babacan; (yellow card) 79' Kerem Can Akyüz; (yellow card) 84' Ismaïl Aissati	Stadium: Doğanlar Stadium; Referee: Mustafa Aydın; Assistant referees: Cemal Alpay, Cem Özbay; Fourth official: Sinan Dereci

16 September 2018 5	Denizlispor	4–1	Eskişehirspor	Denizli
20:00 TRT (UTC+3)	Ziya Alkurt 14'; Recep Niyaz (yellow card) 26'; Ismaïl Aissati 52'; Abdülkerim Bardakcı 66'; Mehmet Akyüz 74'	Report	34' Mehmet Feyzi Yıldırım	Stadium: Atatürk Stadium; Referee: Caner Ak; Assistant referees: Soner Maraş, Bersan Duran; Fourth official: Ferhan Kestanlıoğlu

21 September 2018 6	Osmanlıspor	0–2	Denizlispor	Ankara
19:00 TRT (UTC+3)		Report	15' Recep Niyaz; (yellow card) 40' Burak Altıparmak; 60' Mehmet Akyüz; (yellow card) 77' Adam Stachowiak	Stadium: Osmanlı Stadium; Referee: Yiğit Arslan; Assistant referees: Baran Eraslan, Ali Tuna; Fourth official: Mert Güzenge

29 September 2018 7	Denizlispor	3–0	Elazığspor	Denizli
14:00 TRT (UTC+3)	Alperen Babacan 51'; Ziya Alkurt 67'; Recep Niyaz 90'	Report	(yellow card) 61' Emre Öztürk; (yellow card) 61' (yellow-red card) 82' Mehmet Yiğit; (yellow card) 75' Elmar Bjarnason	Stadium: Atatürk Stadium; Referee: Burak Şeker; Assistant referees: Murat Temel, Gökhan Barcın; Fourth official: Burak Pakkan

6 October 2018 8	Ümraniyespor	3–0	Denizlispor	Istanbul
14:00 TRT (UTC+3)	Lévy Madinda 7'; Emircan Altıntaş 20', 84'; Andreas Vasilogiannis (yellow card) 76'; Atabey Çiçek (yellow card) 82'	Report	(yellow card) 50' Abdülkerim Bardakcı; (yellow card) 57' Recep Niyaz; (yellow card) 80' Alperen Babacan; (yellow card) 88' Ziya Alkurt	Stadium: Ümraniye Town Stadium; Referee: Ramazan Keleş; Assistant referees: Oğuz Terzi, Anıl Usta; Fourth official: Mustafa Aydın

19 October 2018 9	Denizlispor	3–0	Afjet Afyonspor	Denizli
19:00 TRT (UTC+3)	Ziya Alkurt 24'; Mehmet Akyüz 48', 57'	Report	(yellow card) 19' Theo Mendy; (yellow card) 82' Yasin Yener; (yellow card) 86' Bayram Çetin	Stadium: Atatürk Stadium; Referee: Kutluhan Bilgiç; Assistant referees: Bahtiyar Birinci, İlker Takpak; Fourth official: Alper Çetin

26 October 2018 10	Altay	1–3	Denizlispor	İzmir
19:00 TRT (UTC+3)	Marco Paixão 12'; Marco Paixão (yellow card) 45'; Adnan Aganović (yellow card) 50'	Report	24' Alperen Babacan; 30' Burak Çalık; 65' Taha Can Velioğlu	Stadium: İzmir Atatürk Stadium; Referee: Onur Özütoprak; Assistant referees: Kemal Mavi, Hasan Hüseyin Tetik; Fourth official: Sinan Dereci

3 November 2018 11	Denizlispor	4–2	Adanaspor	Denizli
13:30 TRT (UTC+3)	Burak Çalık 2', 73'; Mehmet Akyüz 36'; Taha Can Velioğlu (yellow card) 60'; Kerem Can Akyüz 90'	Report	10' Veli Kızılkaya; (yellow card) 32' Veli Kızılkaya; (yellow card) 60' Ahmet Dereli; 90' Róbert Feczesin	Stadium: Atatürk Stadium; Referee: Sarper Barış Saka; Assistant referees: Habip Tiryaki, Mehmet Emin Tuğral; Fourth official: Emre Malok

10 November 2018 12	Boluspor	1–2	Denizlispor	Bolu
13:30 TRT (UTC+3)	Uğur Akdemir (yellow card) 19'; İshak Çakmak (yellow card) 27' (yellow-red card) 31'; Ismaïl Aissati 35' (o.g.); Umut Gündoğan (yellow card) 63'; Gökhan Değirmenci (yellow card) 78'; Özgür Can Özcan (yellow card) 90'	Report	(yellow card) 45' Mehmet Akyüz; 60' Recep Niyaz; 69' Burak Çalık; (yellow card) 82' Ziya Alkurt	Stadium: Bolu Atatürk Stadium; Referee: Serkan Tokat; Assistant referees: Önder Yılmaz, Ömer Tevfik Özkoç; Fourth official: Bülent Birincioğlu

25 November 2018 13	Denizlispor	3–2	Giresunspor	Denizli
13:30 TRT (UTC+3)	Mehmet Akyüz (yellow card) 31'; Mehmet Akyüz 34'; Kibong Mbamba (yellow card) 50' (yellow-red card) 55'; Deniz Vural (yellow card) 69'; Ziya Alkurt 76'; Abdülkerim Bardakcı (yellow card) 77'; Abdülkerim Bardakcı 84'; Taha Can Velioğlu (yellow card) 90'	Report	3' William Sery; (yellow card) 54' Emre Uruç; 75' Volkan Okumak; (yellow card) 75' Volkan Okumak; (yellow card) 83' Ozan Can Kökçü; (yellow card) 89' Kayacan Erdoğan	Stadium: Atatürk Stadium; Referee: Kadir Sağlam; Assistant referees: Mehmet Kağan Bingül, Emrah Ünal; Fourth official: Murat Erdoğan

1 December 2018 14	Balıkesirspor	0–0	Denizlispor	Balıkesir
16:00 TRT (UTC+3)		Report	(yellow card) 80' Himmet Ertürk; (yellow card) 90' Burak Altıparmak	Stadium: Balıkesir Atatürk Stadium; Referee: Ramazan Keleş; Assistant referees: Cemal Bingül, Çetin Öncel; Fourth official: Mert Güzenge

9 December 2018 15	Denizlispor	0–0	Gençlerbirliği	Denizli
16:00 TRT (UTC+3)	Ismaïl Aissati (yellow card) 17'; Deniz Vural (yellow card) 53'; Ziya Alkurt (yellow card) 74'	Report	(yellow card) 23' Luccas Claro; (yellow card) 50' Deniz Yılmaz	Stadium: Atatürk Stadium; Referee: Kutluhan Bilgiç; Assistant referees: Oğuz Terzi, Hüseyin Aylak; Fourth official: Yasin Kol

15 December 2018 16	Kardemir Karabükspor	2–3	Denizlispor	Karabük
16:00 TRT (UTC+3)	Ali Kemal Yılmaz (yellow card) 49'; Berk Kervamkıram (yellow card) 54'; Batuhan Kurt (yellow card) 59'; Emre Eser (yellow card) 64'; Ahmet Karadayı (yellow card) 74'	Report	3' Recep Niyaz; 15' Ziya Alkurt; 23' Burak Çalık; (yellow card) 76' Recep Niyaz	Stadium: Dr. Necmettin Şeyhoğlu Stadium; Referee: Emre Malok; Assistant referees: Oğuz Kağan Çalışır, Murat Altan; Fourth official: Murat Erdoğan

21 December 2018 17	Denizlispor	1–0	İstanbulspor	Denizli
19:00 TRT (UTC+3)	Recep Niyaz 56'	Report	(yellow card) 86' Muhammed Demirci	Stadium: Atatürk Stadium; Referee: Burak Şeker; Assistant referees: Ali Tuna, Cemil Tunç; Fourth official: Alper Çetin

19 January 2019 18	Gazişehir Gaziantep	0–1	Denizlispor	Gaziantep
13:30 TRT (UTC+3)	Prince Segbefia (yellow card) 59'; Yonathan del Valle (yellow card) 72'; Gökhan Alsan (yellow card) 80'	Report	39' Ziya Alkurt	Stadium: New Gaziantep Stadium; Referee: Atilla Karaoğlan; Assistant referees: Bahtiyar Birinci, Anıl Usta; Fourth official: Yasin Kol

26 January 2019 19	Denizlispor	5–1	Adana Demirspor	Denizli
13:30 TRT (UTC+3)	Mehmet Akyüz 22' (pen.), 62'; Alperen Babacan (yellow card) 27'; Recep Niyaz 45', 74'; Ziya Alkurt 84'	Report	(yellow card) 5' Emre Uruç; (yellow card) 12' Joher Rassoul; (yellow card) 18' Semih Güler; (yellow card) 20' Kurtuluş Yurt; 30' Vedat Bora; (yellow card) 51' Kaan Kana; (yellow card) 87' Milan Mitrović	Stadium: Atatürk Stadium; Referee: Hüseyin Göçek; Assistant referees: Erdem Bayık, Mehmet Salih Mazlum; Fourth official: Ramazan Keleş

3 February 2019 20	Hatayspor	1–1	Denizlispor	Hatay
13:30 TRT (UTC+3)	Gökhan Karadeniz 34'; Yusuf Abdşoğlu (yellow card) 68'; Hamidou Maïga (yellow card) 81'; Sadio Diallo (red card) 90'	Report	(yellow card) 83' Ismaïl Aissati; 90' Lanre Kehinde; (yellow card) 90' Ziya Alkurt	Stadium: Antakya Atatürk Stadium; Referee: Zorbay Küçük; Assistant referees: Utku Tunavelioğlu, Deniz Caner Özaral; Fourth official: Mert Güzenge

10 February 2019 21	Denizlispor	1–0	Altınordu	Denizli
19:00 TRT (UTC+3)	Kibong Mbamba (yellow card) 29'; Kerem Can Akyüz (yellow card) 56'; Deniz Vural (yellow card) 58'; Burak Çalık 65'; Furkan Şeker (yellow card) 90'; Adam Stachowiak (yellow card) 90'	Report	(yellow card) 32' Sefa Yılmaz; (yellow card) 71' Kerim Alıcı	Stadium: Atatürk Stadium; Referee: Süleyman Abay; Assistant referees: Seyfettin Ünal, Hasan Hüseyin Tetik; Fourth official: Murat Erdoğan

18 February 2019 22	Eskişehirspor	1–1	Denizlispor	Eskişehir
19:00 TRT (UTC+3)	Jesse Sekidika 17'; Ibrahim Sissoko (yellow card) 45'; Marko Milinković (yellow card) 46'; Berkay Dabanlı (yellow card) 84'; Kıvanç Karakaş (yellow card) 90'	Report	39' Mehmet Akyüz; (yellow card) 45' Abdülkerim Bardakcı	Stadium: New Eskişehir Stadium; Referee: Tugay Kaan Numanoğlu; Assistant referees: Serdar Diyadin, Selahattin Altay; Fourth official: Burak Şeker

24 February 2019 23	Denizlispor	0–2	Osmanlıspor	Denizli
16:00 TRT (UTC+3)	Recep Niyaz (yellow card) 81'	Report	(yellow card) 26' Numan Çürüksu; 55' Hasan Kılıç; (yellow card) 71' Žydrūnas Karčemarskas; (yellow card) 80' Anıl Karaer; (yellow card) 84' Caner Arıcı; (yellow card) 88' Muhammed Bayır; (yellow card) 90' Eric Ayuk; 90' Eric Ayuk	Stadium: Atatürk Stadium; Referee: Volkan Bayarslan; Assistant referees: Alparslan Dedeş, Erdem Bayık; Fourth official: Onur Özütoprak

2 March 2019 24	Elazığspor	1–2	Denizlispor	Şanlıurfa
13:30 TRT (UTC+3)	Diallo Guidileye (yellow card) 19'; Lamine Diarra 82'	Report	(yellow card) 10' Oğuz Yılmaz; 35', 41' Lanre Kehinde; (yellow card) 66' Deniz Vural	Stadium: GAP Stadium; Referee: Zorbay Küçük; Assistant referees: Vural Gül, Cemal Alpay; Fourth official: Metehan Alpat

11 March 2019 25	Denizlispor	0–0	Ümraniyespor	Denizli
19:00 TRT (UTC+3)	Lanre Kehinde (yellow card) 23'; Ismaïl Aissati (yellow card) 31'; Alperen Babacan (yellow card) 87'; Gökhan Süzen (yellow card) 90'	Report	(yellow card) 22' Alaaddin Okumuş; (yellow card) 40' Serkan Göksu; (yellow card) 88' Muhammed Gönülaçar	Stadium: Atatürk Stadium; Referee: Ali Şansalan; Assistant referees: Gökmen Baltacı, Murat Şener; Fourth official: Yakup Özhan

17 March 2019 26	Afjet Afyonspor	1–3	Denizlispor	Afyonkarahisar
13:30 TRT (UTC+3)	Oltan Karakullukçu 67'; Mehmet Güven (yellow card) 77'	Report	24' Ziya Alkurt; 36' Recep Niyaz; 45' Mehmet Akyüz; (yellow card) 77' Furkan Şeker	Stadium: Zafer Stadium; Referee: Atilla Karaoğlan; Assistant referees: Mehmet Salih Mazlum, Bilal Gölen; Fourth official: Can Cengiz

3 April 2019 27	Denizlispor	3–3	Altay	Denizli
19:00 TRT (UTC+3)	Recep Niyaz 6'; Deniz Vural (yellow card) 24'; Kibong Mbamba (yellow card) 59'; Alperen Babacan (yellow card) 64'; Lanre Kehinde 81'; Mehmet Akyüz 90' (pen.)	Report	32' Ferhat Çulcuoğlu; 40' Marco Paixão; (yellow card) 59' (yellow-red card) 86' Andreas Tatos; (yellow card) 63' Mustafa Murat Uslu; 65' Leandro Kappel	Stadium: Atatürk Stadium; Referee: Sarper Barış Saka; Assistant referees: Mehmet Kağan Bingül, Ali Tuna; Fourth official: Hasan Kaçar

7 April 2019 28	Adanaspor	3–4	Denizlispor	Adana
19:30 TRT (UTC+3)	Famoussa Koné 50'; Famoussa Koné (yellow card) 65'; Furkan Özçal 69'; Digão (yellow card) 77'; Hakan Barış 90' (pen.); Hakan Barış (yellow card) 90' (yellow-red card) 90'; Veli Kızılkaya (yellow card) 90'	Report	59', 89' Recep Niyaz; 74' Lanre Kehinde; (yellow card) 90' Lanre Kehinde; (yellow card) 90' Kerem Can Akyüz; (yellow card) 90' Ismaïl Aissati; 90' Burak Çalık; (yellow card) 90' Burak Çalık	Stadium: 5 Ocak Stadium; Referee: Alper Ulusoy; Assistant referees: Yusuf Bozdoğan, Abdullah Bora Özkara; Fourth official: Semih Kurt

13 April 2019 29	Denizlispor	0–0	Boluspor	Denizli
19:30 TRT (UTC+3)	Alperen Babacan (yellow card) 31'	Report	(yellow card) 23' Hayrullah Bilazer; (yellow card) 48' Batuhan Altıntaş; (yellow card) 90' Umut Gündoğan	Stadium: Atatürk Stadium; Referee: Mete Kalkavan; Assistant referees: Samet Çavuş, Samet Çiçek; Fourth official: Halil İbrahim Yıldırım

20 April 2019 30	Giresunspor	0–3	Denizlispor	Giresun
14:00 TRT (UTC+3)		Report	11', 43' (pen.), 69' Mehmet Akyüz	Stadium: Giresun Atatürk Stadium; Referee: Fırat Aydınus; Assistant referees: Orkun Aktaş, Mehmet Yıldırım; Fourth official: Burak Taşkınsoy

28 April 2019 31	Denizlispor	0–0	Balıkesirspor	Denizli
19:30 TRT (UTC+3)	Abdülkerim Bardakcı (yellow card) 90'; Kibong Mbamba (yellow card) 90'	Report	(yellow card) 11' Tomislav Glumac; (yellow card) 18' Steve Beleck; (yellow card) 90' Okan Alkan; (red card) 90' Nizamettin Çalışkan	Stadium: Atatürk Stadium; Referee: Mert Özenge; Assistant referees: Özgür Ertem, Habip Tiryaki; Fourth official: Serdar Akkoçoğlu

5 May 2019 32	Gençlerbirliği	0–3	Denizlispor	Ankara
19:30 TRT (UTC+3)	Yasin Pehlivan (yellow card) 55'; Barış Başdaş (yellow card) 24'	Report	16' Deniz Vural; (yellow card) 45' Burak Çalık; 85' Recep Niyaz; 90' Lanre Kehinde	Stadium: Eryaman Stadium; Referee: Abdulkadir Bitigen; Assistant referees: Mehmet Şahan Yılmaz, Mustafa Savranlar; Fourth official: Yakup Özhan

12 May 2019 33	Denizlispor	6–0	Kardemir Karabükspor	Denizli
16:30 TRT (UTC+3)	Lanre Kehinde 2', 34', 40'; Furkan Kaçar 44' (o.g.); Burak Çalık 74'; Mehmet Akyüz 90'	Report	(yellow card) 57' Fatih Tultak	Stadium: Atatürk Stadium; Referee: Erkan Özdamar; Assistant referees: Ömer Tevfik Özkoç, Emir Eray Eyisoy; Fourth official: Mustafa Murat Oğuz

18 May 2019 34	İstanbulspor	2–5	Denizlispor	Istanbul
16:30 TRT (UTC+3)	Ali Dere 14'; Muhammed Enes Durmuş (yellow card) 17'; Wellington (yellow card) 67'; Abdullah Balıkuv (yellow card) 72'; İbrahim Yılmaz 90'	Report	9' Lanre Kehinde; (yellow card) 15' Furkan Şeker; 38' (pen.), 80' Ismaïl Aissati; (yellow card) 62' Asil Kaan Güler; 74', 88' Ziya Alkurt	Stadium: Necmi Kadıoğlu Stadium; Referee: Yasin Kol; Assistant referees: Furkan Ürün, Kerem Yükünç; Fourth official: Egemen Artun

=== Turkish Cup ===
25 September 2018 Third round	Bozüyük Vitraspor	0–1	Denizlispor	Bilecik
15:00 TRT (UTC+3)	Yücel Çakır (yellow card) 15'; Oğuz Çelik (red card) 20'; Oğuz Tavsamaz (yellow card) 60'	Report	(yellow card) 60' Furkan Şeker; 82' Burak Çalık	Stadium: Bozöyük Country Stadium; Referee: Mert Güzenge; Assistant referees: Furkan Ürün, Cem Özbay; Fourth official: Burak Taşkınsoy

30 October 2018 Fourth round	Sivas Belediyespor	3–2 (a.e.t.)	Denizlispor	Sivas
13:00 TRT (UTC+3)	Mehmet Fatih Ayık 3'; Alpay Koçaklı (yellow card) 44'; Fatih Çıplak (yellow card) 66'; Mustafa Aydın (yellow card) 85'; Emrah Bedir 103'; Güray Gazioğlu 111'; Osman Şimşek (yellow card) 120'	Report	(yellow card) 39' Cenk Güvenç; 58' Himmet Ertürk; 119' Alperen Babacan	Stadium: Muhsin Yazıcıoğlu Stadium; Referee: Atilla Karaoğlan; Assistant referees: Mehmet Yıldırım, Cemal Alpay; Fourth official: Yalçın Taşkınfurat
