= 2017–18 TFF 1. Lig =

TFF 1. Lig
- Season: 2017–18
- Champions: Çaykur Rizespor
- Promoted: Çaykur Rizespor; MKE Ankaragücü; BB Erzurumspor
- Relegated: Samsunspor; Manisaspor; Gaziantepspor
- Matches: 306
- Goals: 869 (2.84 per match)
- Longest winning run: Gazişehir Gaziantep (6 matches)
- Longest unbeaten run: Çaykur Rizespor (13 matches)
- Longest winless run: Gaziantepspor (10 matches)
- Longest losing run: Gaziantepspor (24 matches)

The 2017–18 TFF 1. Lig is the 17th season since the league was established in 2001 and 55th season of the second-level football league of Turkey since its establishment in 1963–64.

== Teams ==
- Rizespor, Gaziantepspor and Adanaspor relegated from 2016–17 Süper Lig.
- Sivasspor, Yeni Malatyaspor and Göztepe promoted to 2017–18 Süper Lig.
- İstanbulspor, Erzurum BB and Ankaragücü promoted from 2016–17 TFF Second League.
- Şanlıurfaspor, Bandırmaspor and Mersin İdmanyurdu relegated to 2017–18 TFF Second League.

=== Stadia and locations ===
Location of teams in TFF First Lig 2017–18

Team	Home city	Stadium	Capacity
Adana Demirspor	Adana	Adana 5 Ocak Stadium	14,805
Adanaspor	Adana	Adana 5 Ocak Stadium	14,805
Altınordu	İzmir	İzmir Atatürk Stadium	51,295
Ankaragücü	Ankara	Ankara 19 Mayıs Stadium	19,219
Balıkesirspor	Balıkesir	Balıkesir Atatürk Stadium	15,800
Boluspor	Bolu	Bolu Atatürk Stadium	8,881
Denizlispor	Denizli	Denizli Atatürk Stadium	15,420
Elazığspor	Elazığ	Elazığ Atatürk Stadium	13,923
Erzurum BB	Erzurum	Kazım Karabekir Stadium	23,700
Eskişehirspor	Eskişehir	Eskişehir Atatürk Stadium	13,520
Gaziantepspor	Gaziantep	Kalyon Stadium	35,558
Gazişehir Gaziantep	Gaziantep	Kalyon Stadium	35,558
Giresunspor	Giresun	Giresun Atatürk Stadium	12,191
İstanbulspor	Istanbul	Bahçelievler Stadium	4,100
Manisaspor	Manisa	Manisa 19 Mayıs Stadium	18,881
Rizespor	Rize	Yeni Rize Şehir Stadı	15,558
Samsunspor	Samsun	Samsun 19 Mayıs Stadium	16,480
Ümraniyespor	Istanbul	Ümraniye Town Stadium	15,000

=== Foreign players ===
Club	Player 1	Player 2	Player 3	Player 4	Player 5	Player 6	Player 7	Player 8	Former Players
Adana Demirspor	(Brazil) Gegê	(Burkina Faso) Issoumaila Lingane	(Cameroon) Robert Tambe	(Senegal) Théo Mendy	(Togo) Lalawélé Atakora	(Ukraine) Serhiy Politylo			(Montenegro) Edin Rustemović (Republic of the Congo) Yannick Loemba (Togo) Joseph Douhadji
Adanaspor	(Brazil) Didi	(Brazil) Digão	(Brazil) Renan Diniz	(Brazil) Renan Foguinho	(Brazil) Roni	(France) Magaye Gueye	(Hungary) Vladimir Koman	(Nigeria) Uche Kalu	(Brazil) Vinícius
Altınordu									
Ankaragücü	(Belarus) Anton Putsila	(Cameroon) Marc Mbamba	(Nigeria) Lanre Kehinde	(Nigeria) Nduka Ozokwo	(Liberia) Tonia Tisdell	(Poland) Łukasz Szukała			(Brazil) Doka Madureira (Senegal) Cheikhou Dieng (Uruguay) Santiago Mele
Balıkesirspor	(Cameroon) Steve Beleck	(Central African Republic) Foxi Kéthévoama	(Croatia) Andrija Vuković	(Croatia) Tomislav Glumac	(Ghana) Mahatma Otoo				(Morocco) Ismaïl Aissati
Boluspor	(Albania) Renato Arapi	(Brazil) André Santos	(Colombia) Pedro Franco	(Netherlands) Rydell Poepon	(Nigeria) Chukwuma Akabueze	(Senegal) Chérif Sané	(Senegal) Mamadou Diarra		(Netherlands) Mitchell te Vrede
Çaykur Rizespor	(Brazil) Lincoln	(Brazil) Maurício Ramos	(Cameroon) Léonard Kweuke	(Italy) Davide Petrucci	(Morocco) Marwane Saâdane	(Paraguay) Braian Samudio			(Austria) Jakob Jantscher (Nigeria) Bright Edomwonyi (Sweden) Alexander Milošević
Denizlispor	(Morocco) Ismaïl Aissati	(Netherlands) Leandro Kappel	(Nigeria) Patrick Friday Eze	(Serbia) Darko Lazić					(Brazil) André Moritz (Sierra Leone) Alfred Sankoh
Elazığspor	(Brazil) Tom	(Greece) Andreas Tatos	(Iceland) Elmar Bjarnason	(Netherlands) Jeffrey Sarpong	(Romania) Ioan Hora	(Senegal) Lamine Diarra			(Brazil) Lúcio Maranhão
Erzurum BB	(Bosnia and Herzegovina) Jasmin Šćuk	(Cameroon) Bekamenga	(The Gambia) Demba Savage	(Ivory Coast) Stephane Acka	(Serbia) Jasmin Trtovac				(Bosnia and Herzegovina) Haris Harba (Senegal) Boubacar Mansaly (Tunisia) Hamza Younés
Eskişehirspor	(Brazil) Bruno Mezenga	(Georgia (country)) Davit Janelidze	(Ghana) Jerry Akaminko	(Nigeria) Chico Ofoedu					(Lebanon) Felix Melki
Gaziantepspor									
Gazişehir Gaziantep	(Bosnia and Herzegovina) Ermin Zec	(Brazil) Jefferson	(Cameroon) Pierre Webó	(Mauritania) Adama Ba	(Poland) Adam Stachowiak	(Togo) Prince Segbefia	(Venezuela) Yonathan Del Valle		(Belgium) Nathan Kabasele (Netherlands) Daoud Bousbiba (Togo) Serge Akakpo
Giresunspor	(Brazil) Dodô	(Brazil) Henrique Almeida	(Brazil) Jones Carioca	(Ghana) Kofi Atta	(Israel) Ahmed Abed	(Senegal) Boubacar Dialiba	(Sweden) Panajotis Dimitriadis	(Ukraine) Dmytro Korkishko	(Brazil) Brinner (France) Maurice Dalé
İstanbulspor	(Bosnia and Herzegovina) Aldin Čajić	(Brazil) Wellington	(Ivory Coast) Jean-Jacques Bougouhi	(Serbia) Nemanja Kojić					
Manisaspor	(Algeria) Billal Sebaihi	(Republic of the Congo) Constantin Bakaki	(Serbia) Nikola Mikić	(Serbia) Slavko Perović					(Bulgaria) Daniel Dimov (Gabon) Axel Méyé (Nigeria) Iyayi Atiemwen
Samsunspor	(Greece) Georgios Samaras	(Greece) Michalis Sifakis	(Ivory Coast) Davy Claude Angan	(Nigeria) John Chibuike	(Togo) Jonathan Ayité				(Tunisia) Mohamed Larbi
Ümraniyespor	(Brazil) Cleyton	(Bulgaria) Dimitar Rangelov	(Gabon) Aaron Appindangoyé	(Greece) Andreas Vasilogiannis	(Ivory Coast) Jean Armel Drolé				

== League table ==
Pos	Team	Pld	W	D	L	GF	GA	GD	Pts	Qualification or relegation
1	Rizespor (C, P)	34	20	9	5	68	38	+30	69	Promotion to the Süper Lig
2	Ankaragücü (P)	34	18	9	7	55	34	+21	63	Promotion to the Süper Lig
3	Boluspor	34	18	6	10	53	30	+23	60	Qualification for the Süper Lig Playoffs
4	Ümraniyespor	34	17	8	9	49	35	+14	59	Qualification for the Süper Lig Playoffs
5	Erzurum BB (O, P)	34	14	11	9	56	44	+12	53 (Note: Head-to-head points: Erzurum BB 8 pts, Gazişehir Gaziantep 7 pts, Altınordu 1 pt)	Qualification for the Süper Lig Playoffs
6	Gazişehir Gaziantep	34	15	8	11	57	38	+19	53	Qualification for the Süper Lig Playoffs
7	Altınordu	34	15	8	11	55	45	+10	53	
8	Balıkesirspor	34	16	7	11	56	46	+10	52 (Note: Balıkesirspor have been deducted 3 points.)	
9	İstanbulspor	34	14	8	12	45	39	+6	50	
10	Elazığspor	34	13	9	12	53	44	+9	48	
11	Giresunspor	34	13	8	13	50	44	+6	47	
12	Adanaspor	34	12	7	15	41	56	−15	43	
13	Adana Demirspor	34	11	8	15	44	47	−3	41 (Note: Adana Demirspor is ahead of Eskişehirspor on head-to-head points: Eskişehirspor 2-2 Adana Demirspor, Adana Demirspor 3-1 Eskişehirspor)	
14	Eskişehirspor (Note: Eskişehirspor have been deducted 3 points.)	34	12	8	14	63	56	+7	41	
15	Denizlispor	34	10	8	16	43	47	−4	38	
16	Samsunspor (R)	34	7	15	12	32	46	−14	36	Relegation to the TFF Second League
17	Manisaspor (R)	34	7	3	24	31	80	−49	15 (Note: Manisaspor have been deducted 9 points.)	Relegation to the TFF Second League
18	Gaziantepspor (R)	34	2	4	28	18	100	−82	1 (Note: Gaziantepspor have been deducted 9 points.)	Relegation to the TFF Second League

Source: TFF 1. Lig
Rules for classification: 1) Points; 2) Head-to-head points; 3) Head-to-head goal difference; 4) Head-to-head goals scored; 5) Goal difference; 6) Goals scored
(C) Champions; (O) Play-off winners; (P) Promoted; (R) Relegated

== Results ==
Home \ Away	ADS	ADA	ATO	AGÜ	BAL	BOL	BBE	ÇYR	DEN	ELA	ESK	GAZ	GFK	GRS	İST	MAN	SAM	ÜMR
Adana Demirspor	—	1–0	1–0	2–1	0–2	1–3	2–3	1–3	3–1	2–2	3–1	3–1	2–2	1–2	2–1	2–1	1–1	0–1
Adanaspor	1–0	—	1–3	0–0	0–1	2–3	2–1	3–2	3–0	2–2	0–3	3–2	2–5	1–1	0–0	1–0	2–1	2–1
Altınordu	1–1	1–1	—	1–1	2–1	1–5	1–1	3–4	2–1	2–1	0–0	3–0	0–2	3–3	3–1	3–0	1–1	1–2
MKE Ankaragücü	1–1	2–1	0–2	—	1–2	2–0	0–0	2–4	2–1	0–0	1–0	4–0	4–0	3–2	1–0	3–0	1–0	2–1
Balıkesirspor	2–2	4–1	2–1	1–3	—	0–2	2–0	1–1	2–1	1–1	2–3	2–0	1–0	0–0	0–1	4–1	2–0	1–1
Boluspor	3–1	1–0	1–2	3–1	2–4	—	1–1	0–1	1–0	2–0	3–0	2–0	0–0	2–2	3–1	3–0	1–0	0–1
BB Erzurumspor	2–0	2–1	2–1	0–0	4–3	0–2	—	1–1	4–1	4–1	2–1	5–1	2–1	5–4	1–0	1–1	1–1	0–0
Çaykur Rizespor	1–0	1–1	0–3	1–4	3–0	1–0	2–0	—	3–2	1–1	4–1	5–1	4–2	1–0	3–0	4–1	1–1	4–0
Denizlispor	1–0	3–1	2–0	3–1	0–2	1–1	2–1	0–0	—	2–3	0–2	5–0	1–0	0–1	0–1	2–2	0–0	2–0
Elazığspor	2–1	2–3	0–2	2–0	2–2	0–1	0–1	3–1	1–0	—	1–0	2–0	1–2	2–1	2–2	8–1	2–2	3–0
Eskişehirspor	2–2	1–2	2–4	1–3	1–3	2–2	3–1	1–1	2–2	1–2	—	7–0	1–4	3–1	1–2	3–2	5–0	1–1
Gaziantepspor	0–3	0–3	0–1	1–2	1–3	0–3	0–0	0–0	0–0	0–3	1–4	—	0–4	4–5	1–1	1–4	2–1	0–3
Gazişehir Gaziantep	1–0	4–0	3–2	2–2	0–1	2–0	2–2	1–2	0–2	1–0	2–2	0–1	—	1–1	2–0	2–0	3–0	2–0
Giresunspor	0–2	3–0	0–0	0–1	1–0	0–2	2–0	3–2	0–2	0–0	3–1	2–0	4–1	—	0–1	0–1	2–1	1–1
İstanbulspor	2–2	4–0	2–0	1–2	4–1	1–0	2–2	2–3	2–1	1–2	2–2	4–0	1–0	0–1	—	1–0	1–1	2–1
Manisaspor	2–1	1–2	1–2	0–3	3–1	2–1	1–6	0–3	1–1	2–1	0–1	3–1	0–6	0–4	1–2	—	0–1	0–2
Samsunspor	0–1	0–0	1–4	1–1	2–1	0–0	1–0	0–0	2–2	2–0	0–4	3–0	0–0	2–1	0–0	2–0	—	3–3
Ümraniyespor	1–0	1–0	2–0	1–1	2–2	1–0	2–1	0–1	4–2	2–1	0–1	7–0	0–0	1–0	1–0	2–0	4–2	—

Source: TFF
Legend: Blue = home team win; Yellow = draw; Red = away team win.

== Promotion playoffs ==
=== Semifinals ===
Team 1	Agg.	Team 2	1st leg	2nd leg
Erzurum BB	6–4	Ümraniyespor	4–3	2–1
Gazişehir Gaziantep	4–1	Boluspor	1–0	3–1

=== Final ===
Team 1	Score	Team 2
Gazişehir Gaziantep	0–0 (4–5 p)	Erzurum BB

== See also ==
- 2017–18 Turkish Cup
- 2017–18 Süper Lig
