= Emre Öztürk =

Emre Öztürk may refer to:

- Emre Öztürk (footballer, born 1986), Turkish-German footballer
- Emre Öztürk (footballer, born 1992), Turkish footballer
