= Cenk Güvenç =

Turkish footballer

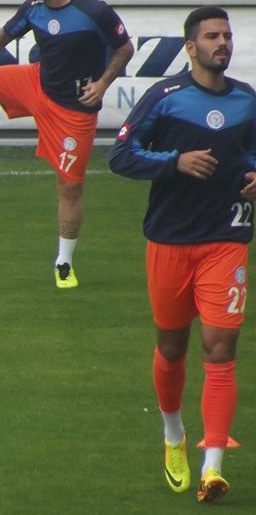

Personal information
- Full name: Cenk Güvenç
- Date of birth: December 29, 1991 (age 34)
- Place of birth: Seligenstadt, Germany
- Height: 1.89 m (6 ft 2 in)
- Position: Centre back

Youth career
- Kickers Offenbach

Senior career*
Years	Team	Apps	(Gls)
2009–2012	Gaziantepspor	7	(0)
2012–2013	Atlético Madrid B	7	(1)
2013–2015	Çaykur Rizespor	0	(0)
2014–2015	→ Karşıyaka (loan)	41	(2)
2015–2019	Denizlispor	77	(1)
2019	Afjet Afyonspor	12	(0)
2019–2020	Balıkesirspor	14	(0)
- * Club domestic league appearances and goals as of 19:50, 6 July 2020 (UTC)

Cenk Güvenç (born December 29, 1991) is a footballer who most recently played for Balıkesirspor. Born in Germany, he represented Turkey at youth international level.
