= Taha Can Velioğlu =

Turkish footballer

Personal information
- Date of birth: 21 February 1994 (age 32)
- Place of birth: Sakarya Province, Turkey
- Height: 1.86 m (6 ft 1 in)
- Position: Centre back

Team information
- Current team: Arnavutköy Belediyespor
- Number: 4

Youth career
- 2004–2010: Bursaspor

Senior career*
Years	Team	Apps	(Gls)
2010–2013	Bursaspor	1	(0)
2013–2016	Bucaspor	44	(2)
2016	Ankara Adliyespor	15	(0)
2016–2019	Denizlispor	49	(2)
2019	Manisa	3	(0)
2020–2021	Eyüpspor	38	(0)
2021–2022	Afjet Afyonspor	28	(2)
2022–2023	Fethiyespor	19	(3)
2023–2024	1461 Trabzon	17	(0)
2024–2025	Bursaspor	29	(2)
2025–	Arnavutköy Belediyespor	11	(0)

International career^{‡}
2009	Turkey U15	2	(0)
2009–2010	Turkey U16	10	(1)
2010–2011	Turkey U17	12	(0)
2011–2012	Turkey U18	9	(0)
2012	Turkey U19	8	(0)
2013	Turkey U20	1	(0)
- * Club domestic league appearances and goals as of 6 December 2025 ‡ National team caps and goals as of 10 October 2013

Taha Can Velioğlu (born 21 February 1994) is a Turkish footballer who plays as a centre back for TFF 2. Lig club Arnavutköy Belediyespor. He made his Süper Lig debut for Bursaspor on 19 May 2013 against Gençlerbirliği.
