= Veli Kızılkaya =

Turkish footballer

Personal information
- Date of birth: 1 February 1985 (age 41)
- Place of birth: Altıntaş, Kütahya, Turkey
- Height: 1.92 m (6 ft 4 in)
- Position: Centre back

Team information
- Current team: Belediye Kütahyaspor

Youth career
- 1999–2001: Özel İdare Köyhizmetlerispor
- 2001–2003: Kütahyaspor

Senior career*
Years	Team	Apps	(Gls)
2003–2005	Kütahyaspor	27	(3)
2005–2008	Kahramanmaraşspor	95	(10)
2008–2011	Bucaspor	53	(3)
2011	Kayseri Erciyesspor	15	(1)
2011–2012	Boluspor	32	(1)
2012–2013	Göztepe	27	(0)
2013–2014	Adanaspor	24	(0)
2014–2016	Şanlıurfaspor	60	(1)
2016–2017	Bucaspor	37	(2)
2018	Kastamonuspor 1966	12	(0)
2018–2019	Adanaspor	38	(3)
2020	Tuzlaspor	5	(0)
2020–2021	Afjet Afyonspor	8	(0)
2021	Sancaktepe	5	(0)
2021–	Belediye Kütahyaspor	23	(0)

International career
2006	Turkey U21	1	(0)
- * Club domestic league appearances and goals as of 30 October 2022

Veli Kızılkaya (born 1 February 1985) is a Turkish professional footballer who plays as a defender for Belediye Kütahyaspor. He was also a youth international, making one appearance for the Turkey national under-21 football team in 2006.

== Club career ==
Kızılkaya began his career with Özel İdare Köyhizmetlerispor, an amateur club, in 1999. He was transferred to Kütahyaspor in 2001, and promoted to the senior team in 2003. Kahramanmaraşspor transferred him in 2005, and then sold him to Bucaspor in 2008. Kızılkaya was a part of the Bucaspor squad that earned promotion to the Süper Lig at the end of the 2009–10 season. In January 2011, he transferred from Bucaspor to Kayseri Erciyesspor.

On 31 August 2016, he rejoined Bucaspor on a one-year contract.
