= Bilal Ould-Chikh =

Dutch footballer (born 1997)

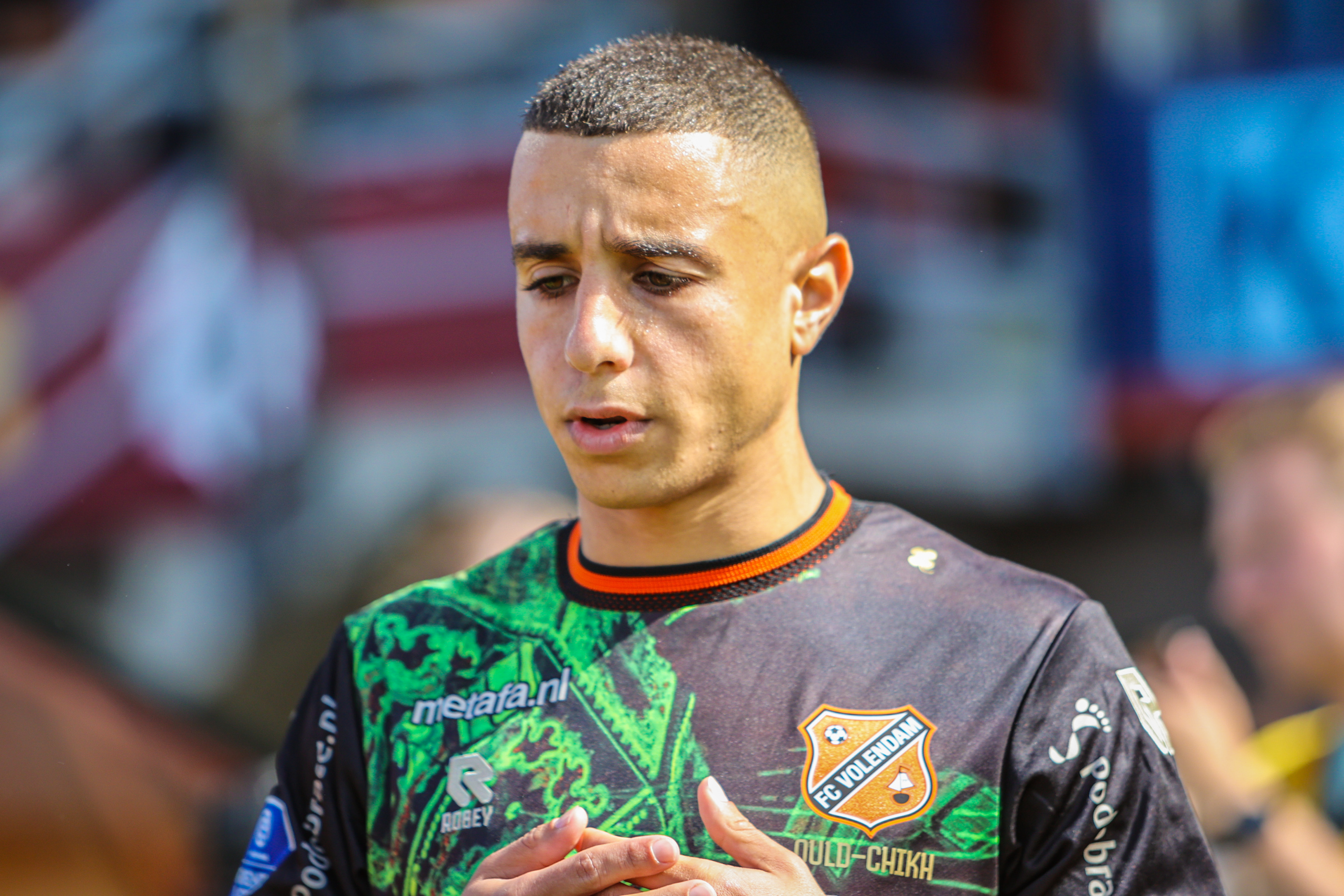
- Ould-Chikh with Volendam

Personal information
- Date of birth: 28 July 1997 (age 29)
- Place of birth: Roosendaal, Netherlands
- Height: 1.70 m (5 ft 7 in)
- Position: Winger

Team information
- Current team: Raja CA

Youth career
- 2011–2012: Willem II
- 2012–2015: Twente

Senior career*
Years	Team	Apps	(Gls)
2013–2015	Jong Twente	18	(2)
2013–2015	Twente	16	(1)
2015–2017	Benfica B	12	(0)
2017–2018	Utrecht	3	(0)
2017–2018	Jong Utrecht	11	(1)
2019	Denizlispor	0	(0)
2019–2021	ADO Den Haag	27	(0)
2022–2025	Volendam	95	(11)
2025–	Raja CA	7	(0)
2026	→ Volendam (loan)	12	(0)

International career
2012	Netherlands U15	1	(0)
2013	Netherlands U17	5	(1)
2014–2016	Netherlands U19	9	(1)
- * Club domestic league appearances and goals as of 19 May 2026

Bilal Ould-Chikh (Arabic: بلال ولد الشيخ; born 28 July 1997) is a Dutch professional footballer who plays as a winger for Moroccan club Raja CA.

== Club career ==
Born in Roosendaal, Netherlands, Ould-Chikh joined the youth system at Willem II in 2011, before moving to FC Twente's youth academy in 2012. He quickly rose through the club's system, making his senior debut on 3 May 2014 against PEC Zwolle by replacing Youness Mokhtar after 69 minutes in a 2–2 draw at De Grolsch Veste.

On 30 July 2015, two days after turning 18, Ould-Chikh signed with Portuguese champions Benfica for five seasons. On 20 September 2015, he debuted for the reserve team in Segunda Liga, replacing João Carvalho after 62 minutes of a 1–0 home win over Gil Vicente.

On 1 March 2017, Benfica announced that Ould-Chikh's contract was terminated. After that Ould-Chikh announced he would start training with the Dutch club FC Utrecht.

On 31 December 2021, Ould-Chikh signed with Volendam until the summer of 2023, with an option to extend.

On 24 July 2025, he moved to his ancestral country and signed a two-year contract with Raja CA.

On 30 January 2026, Ould-Chikh returned to Volendam on a six-months loan.

== Personal life ==
Ould-Chikh is of Moroccan descent. His younger brother Walid is also a footballer.

== Career statistics ==
As of match played 12 November 2022

Appearances and goals by club, season and competition
Club	Season	League			National cup		Other		Total	
Club	Season	Division	Apps	Goals	Apps	Goals	Apps	Goals	Apps	Goals
Jong Twente	2013–14	Eerste Divisie	7	2	—		—		7	2
Jong Twente	2014–15	Eerste Divisie	11	0	—		—		11	0
Jong Twente	Total		18	2	—		—		18	2
Twente	2013–14	Eredivisie	1	0	0	0	0	0	1	0
Twente	2014–15	Eredivisie	15	1	2	0	1 (Note: Appearances in UEFA Europa League)	0	18	1
Twente	Total		16	1	2	0	1	0	19	1
Benfica B	2015–16	LigaPro	12	0	—		—		12	0
Benfica B	2016–17	LigaPro	0	0	—		—		0	0
Benfica B	Total		12	0	—		—		12	0
Jong FC Utrecht	2017–18	Eerste Divisie	11	1	—		—		11	1
Utrecht	2017–18	Eredivisie	3	0	1	0	1	0	5	0
Denizlispor	2018–19	TFF First League	0	0	0	0	0	0	0	0
ADO Den Haag	2019–20	Eredivisie	13	0	0	0	—		13	0
ADO Den Haag	2020–21	Eredivisie	14	0	2	0	—		13	0
ADO Den Haag	Total		27	0	2	0	—		29	0
FC Volendam	2021–22	Eerste Divisie	15	3	0	0	—		15	3
FC Volendam	2022–23	Eredivisie	11	0	1	0	0	0	12	0
FC Volendam	Total		26	3	1	0	—		27	3
Career total			113	7	6	0	2	0	121	7

== Honours ==
Denizlispor

- TFF First League: 2018–19

Volendam

- Eerste Divisie: 2024–25
