= Recep Niyaz =

Turkish footballer

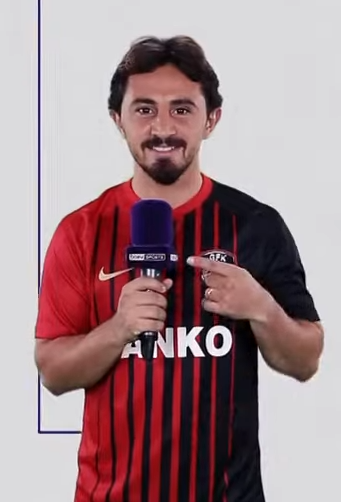
- Niyaz in 2021

Personal information
- Date of birth: 2 August 1995 (age 31)
- Place of birth: Denizli, Turkey
- Height: 1.64 m (5 ft 5 in)
- Position: Attacking midfielder

Team information
- Current team: Esenler Erokspor
- Number: 20

Youth career
- 2005–2010: Denizlispor
- 2010–2012: Fenerbahçe

Senior career*
Years	Team	Apps	(Gls)
2010–2011	Fenerbahçe A2	14	(9)
2011–2015	Fenerbahçe	10	(1)
2013–2014	→ Bucaspor (loan)	27	(4)
2014–2015	→ Samsunspor (loan)	28	(5)
2015–2016	Denizlispor	27	(8)
2016–2018	Çaykur Rizespor	53	(8)
2018–2021	Denizlispor	81	(18)
2021–2022	Gaziantep	29	(1)
2022–2025	Eyüpspor	49	(7)
2025–	Esenler Erokspor	31	(7)

International career
2009	Turkey U15	9	(4)
2009–2010	Turkey U16	18	(7)
2010–2012	Turkey U17	14	(4)
2011–2012	Turkey U18	7	(5)
2012–2013	Turkey U19	7	(3)
Medal record
Turkey U19
Runner-up	Mediterranean Games	2013
- * Club domestic league appearances and goals as of 5 May 2026

Recep Niyaz (Turkish pronunciation: [ɾeˈdʒep niˈjaz]; born 2 August 1995) is a Turkish professional footballer who plays as an attacking midfielder for TFF 1. Lig club Esenler Erokspor.

== Club career ==
Recep Niyaz started his career at youth division of Denizlispor in 2005, where he played until 2010. Niyaz joined Fenerbahçe subsequent to scouting outputs of Rıdvan Dilmen in 2010. He signed his first professional contract with Fenerbahçe on 16 June 2010. He began playing with the Fenerbahçe A2 squad. He has scored nine goals in 14 appearances in the A2 League. Recep Niyaz earned his first senior team call-up under Aykut Kocaman and made his professional debut against Manisaspor on 16 January 2012, coming on as a substitution for Henri Bienvenu in the 79th minute. His first professional goal was against Göztepe at the 88th minute at Turkish Cup in Fifth round on 12 December 2012.

On 18 July 2018, Niyaz returned Denizlispor on a 3-year-long contract. On 21 May 2021, Niyaz terminated his contract with Denizlispor, activating the pertinent clause in return of his outstanding receivables.

== International career ==
Niyaz played for the Turkey national under-19 football team, which won the silver medal at the 2013 Mediterranean Games in Mersin, Turkey. In same year, he represented Turkey at the 2013 UEFA European Under-19 Championship.

== Honours ==
Fenerbahçe S.K.

- Turkish Cup (2): 2011–12, 2012–13

== Career statistics ==
As of 22 May 2021.

Appearances and goals by club, season and competition
Club	Season	League			Cup^{1}		Other^{2}		Continental^{3}		Total	
Club	Season	Division	Apps	Goals	Apps	Goals	Apps	Goals	Apps	Goals	Apps	Goals
Fenerbahçe
Fenerbahçe	Süper Lig	2011–12	3	0	0	0	—		—		3	0
Fenerbahçe	Süper Lig	2012–13	2	0	3	1	—		2	0	7	1
Fenerbahçe	Süper Lig	2013–14	0	0	0	0	—		0	0	0	0
Total			5	0	3	1	—		2	0	10	1
Bucaspor (loan)
Bucaspor (loan)	TFF First League	2013–14	27	4	2	0	—		—		29	4
Samsunspor (loan)
Samsunspor (loan)	TFF First League	2014–15	28	5	5	0	—		—		33	5
Denizlispor
Denizlispor	TFF First League	2015–16	27	8	0	0	—		—		27	8
Çaykur Rizespor
Çaykur Rizespor	Süper Lig	2016–17	21	4	9	2	—		—		30	6
Çaykur Rizespor	Süper Lig	2017–18	31	4	1	0	—		—		32	4
Total			52	8	10	2	—		—		62	10
Denizlispor
Denizlispor	TFF First League	2018–19	33	12	2	0	—		—		35	12
Denizlispor	Süper Lig	2019–20	15	1	6	3	—		—		21	4
Denizlispor	Süper Lig	2020–21	28	5	0	0	—		—		28	5
Total			76	17	8	3	—		—		84	21
Career total			215	43	28	6	—		2	0	245	49

- 1.Includes Turkish Cup.
- 2.Includes Turkish Super Cup.
- 3.Includes UEFA Champions League and UEFA Europa League.
