= Santiago Mele =

Uruguayan footballer (born 1997)

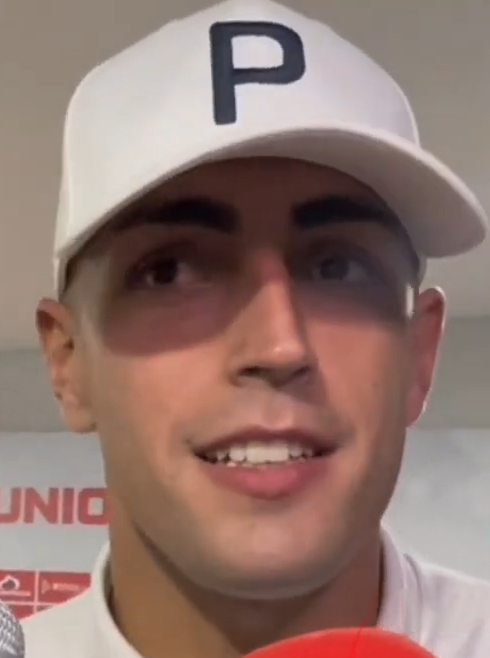
- Mele in 2024

Personal information
- Full name: Santiago Andrés Mele Castañero
- Date of birth: 6 September 1997 (age 29)
- Place of birth: Montevideo, Uruguay
- Height: 1.85 m (6 ft 1 in)
- Position: Goalkeeper

Team information
- Current team: Independiente (on loan from Monterrey)
- Number: 77

Youth career
- Fénix

Senior career*
Years	Team	Apps	(Gls)
2016–2017	Fénix	6	(0)
2017–2020	Osmanlıspor	13	(0)
2017	→ Ankaragücü (loan)	0	(0)
2018	→ Lleida Esportiu (loan)	0	(0)
2020–2024	Plaza Colonia	40	(0)
2022–2023	→ Unión Santa Fe (loan)	48	(0)
2023	→ Atlético Junior (loan)	20	(0)
2024–2025	Atlético Junior	53	(0)
2025–	Monterrey	17	(0)
2026–	→ Independiente (loan)	0	(0)

International career^{‡}
2015	Uruguay U18	3	(0)
2015–2017	Uruguay U20	28	(0)
2019	Uruguay U22	4	(0)
2023–	Uruguay	10	(0)
Medal record
Men's football
Representing Uruguay
Copa América
Third place	2024 United States
South American U-20 Championship
Winner	2017 Ecuador
- * Club domestic league appearances and goals as of 1 August 2026 ‡ National team caps and goals as of 18 November 2026

Santiago Andrés Mele Castañero (born 6 September 1997) is a Uruguayan professional footballer who plays as a goalkeeper for AFA Liga Profesional de Fútbol club Independiente, on loan from Liga MX club Monterrey, and the Uruguay national team.

== Club career ==
A youth academy graduate of Fénix, Mele made his professional debut on 30 August 2016 in a 1–0 loss against Cerro.

On 4 September 2017, Turkish top division club Osmanlıspor announced the signing of Mele on a five-year deal. He was immediately loaned out to second division club Ankaragücü for 2017–18 season. However, with Korcan Çelikay and Altay Bayındır ahead of him in pecking order, he didn't receive any playing minutes.

Mele's loan was cut short in following January and he subsequently got loaned out to Spanish third division side Lleida Esportiu. With Diego Rivas Rego as first-choice goalkeeper, Mele failed to find playing minutes again.

Two years after joining the club, Mele made his debut for Osmanlıspor on 17 August 2019 in a 2–1 win against Boluspor.

== International career ==
Mele is a former Uruguay youth international. He was part of Uruguay under-20 team which won the 2017 South American U-20 Championship and finished fourth at the 2017 FIFA U-20 World Cup. He was also part of the Uruguay under-22 team which finished fourth at the 2019 Pan American Games.

On 21 October 2022, Mele was named in Uruguay's 55-man preliminary squad for the 2022 FIFA World Cup. He made his senior team debut on 28 March 2023 in a 2–1 win against South Korea.

In June 2024, Mele was named in Uruguay's 26-man squad for the 2024 Copa América. On 31 May 2026, he was named in Uruguay's 26-man squad for the 2026 FIFA World Cup.

== Career statistics ==
=== Club ===
As of match played 8 December 2024

Appearances and goals by club, season and competition
Club	Season	League			Cup		Continental		Other		Total	
Club	Season	Division	Apps	Goals	Apps	Goals	Apps	Goals	Apps	Goals	Apps	Goals
Fénix	2013–14	Uruguayan Primera División	0	0	—		—		—		0	0
Fénix	2014–15	Uruguayan Primera División	0	0	—		—		—		0	0
Fénix	2015–16	Uruguayan Primera División	0	0	—		—		—		0	0
Fénix	2016	Uruguayan Primera División	6	0	—		—		—		6	0
Fénix	2017	Uruguayan Primera División	0	0	—		—		—		0	0
Fénix	Total		6	0	—		—		—		6	0
Osmanlıspor	2018–19	TFF First League	0	0	0	0	—		0	0	0	0
Osmanlıspor	2019–20	TFF First League	13	0	0	0	—		—		13	0
Osmanlıspor	Total		13	0	0	0	—		0	0	13	0
Ankaragücü (loan)	2017–18	TFF First League	0	0	0	0	—		—		0	0
Lleida Esportiu (loan)	2017–18	Segunda División B	0	0	0	0	—		—		0	0
Plaza Colonia	2020	Uruguayan Primera División	20	0	—		2	0	—		22	0
Plaza Colonia	2021	Uruguayan Primera División	20	0	—		—		1	0	21	0
Plaza Colonia	Total		40	0	—		2	0	1	0	43	0
Unión (loan)	2022	Argentine Primera División	22	0	2	0	7	0	10	0	41	0
Unión (loan)	2023	Argentine Primera División	16	0	1	0	—		—		17	0
Unión (loan)	Total		38	0	3	0	7	0	10	0	58	0
Atlético Junior (loan)	2023	Categoría Primera A	20	0	2	0	—		—		22	0
Atlético Junior	2024	Categoría Primera A	37	0	1	0	8	0	2	0	48	0
Career total			154	0	6	0	17	0	13	0	190	0

=== International ===
As of match played 17 November 2026

Appearances and goals by national team and year
National team	Year	Apps	Goals
Uruguay	2023	3	0
Uruguay	2024	1	0
Uruguay	2025	4	0
Uruguay	2026	2	0
Total		10	0

== Honours ==
Atlético Junior

- Categoría Primera A: 2023-II

Uruguay U20

- South American Youth Football Championship: 2017

Uruguay

- Copa América third place: 2024

Individual

- Uruguayan Primera División Team of the Year: 2021
