= Burak Çalık =

Turkish footballer

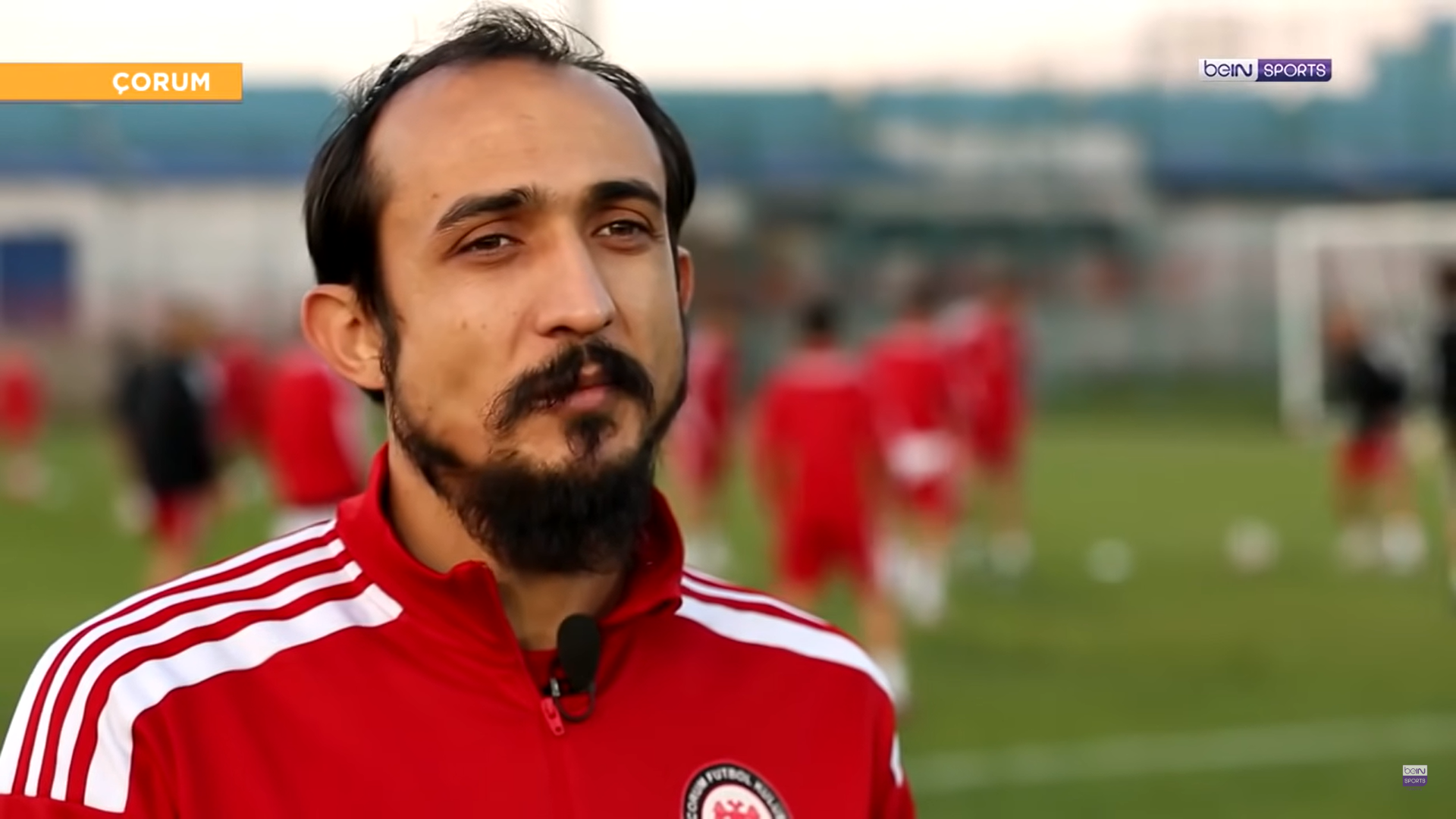
- Burak Çalık

Personal information
- Date of birth: 5 February 1989 (age 37)
- Place of birth: Erzincan, Turkey
- Height: 1.78 m (5 ft 10 in)
- Positions: Winger; striker

Youth career
- 2001–2006: Erzincanspor

Senior career*
Years	Team	Apps	(Gls)
2006–2008	24 Erzincanspor	20	(7)
2008–2011	Altay	74	(23)
2011–2013	Samsunspor	4	(0)
2012	→ Adanaspor (loan)	13	(4)
2013	Adanaspor	14	(0)
2013–2015	Balıkesirspor	31	(6)
2015–2016	Adana Demirspor	31	(13)
2016–2018	Balıkesirspor	52	(13)
2018–2019	Denizlispor	35	(9)
2020–2021	Samsunspor	35	(8)
2021–2023	Çorum	46	(10)
2023	Kastamonuspor 1966	12	(1)

International career
2009–2010	Turkey U21	4	(0)
- * Club domestic league appearances and goals

Burak Çalık (born 5 February 1989) is a Turkish former footballer who played as a striker.

== Life and career ==
Çalık was born in Erzincan, the capital of Erzincan Province. He started his football career with the local club Erzincanspor in 2001. He competed in the youth leagues until 2006, when he was promoted to the senior team. He played a total of 20 matches in the TFF First League, netting seven goals. Altay signed the forward in 2008. He has since been capped by the Turkey national under-21 football team, chosen as the best player of the year in the TFF First League, and attracted interest from Süper Lig clubs. Çalık signed a one-year extension with Altay at the end of the 2009–10 season.

== International career ==
Çalık was first called up to the Turkey national under-21 football team in the summer of 2009, and earned his first cap in a friendly against Azerbaijan. He has also been called up for the 2011 UEFA European Under-21 Football Championship qualifying matches, as well as Akdeniz Cup matches.
