= Emre Öztürk (footballer, born 1992) =

Turkish footballer

Personal information
- Date of birth: 26 August 1992 (age 34)
- Place of birth: Kocasinan, Turkey
- Height: 1.79 m (5 ft 10 in)
- Positions: Left back; left winger

Team information
- Current team: Arnavutköy Belediyespor
- Number: 3

Youth career
- 2003–2011: Kayseri Erciyesspor

Senior career*
Years	Team	Apps	(Gls)
2011–2016	Kayseri Erciyesspor	67	(1)
2016–2017	Sivasspor	5	(0)
2016–2017	→ Manisaspor (loan)	20	(0)
2017–2019	Elazığspor	35	(2)
2019	Afjet Afyonspor	15	(0)
2019	İnegölspor	12	(2)
2020–2021	Boluspor	6	(0)
2021–2023	Çorum	43	(2)
2023–2024	Vanspor	17	(3)
2024	Küçükçekmece Sinopspor	12	(1)
2025–	Arnavutköy Belediyespor	32	(2)
- * Club domestic league appearances and goals as of 1 October 2026

Emre Öztürk (born 26 August 1992) is a Turkish footballer who plays as a left back for TFF 2. Lig club Arnavutköy Belediyespor. He made his Süper Lig debut on 20 September 2013.
