= Ismaïl Aissati =

Moroccan footballer (born 1988)

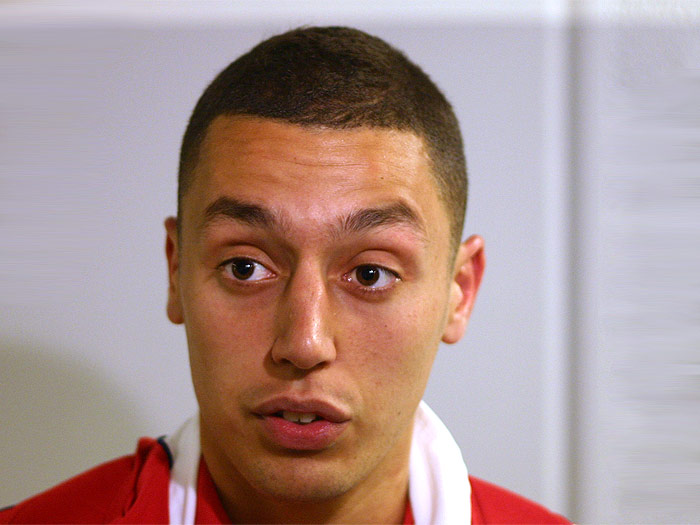
- Aissati in 2009

Personal information
- Date of birth: 16 August 1988 (age 38)
- Place of birth: Utrecht, Netherlands
- Height: 1.74 m (5 ft 9 in)
- Position: Attacking midfielder

Youth career
- DSO Utrecht
- 1995–2000: Elinkwijk
- 2000–2005: PSV

Senior career*
Years	Team	Apps	(Gls)
2005–2008	PSV	44	(3)
2007	→ Twente (loan)	14	(1)
2008–2012	Ajax	36	(6)
2010–2011	→ Vitesse (loan)	29	(4)
2012–2013	Antalyaspor	26	(3)
2013–2016	Terek Grozny	64	(1)
2016–2017	Alanyaspor	12	(0)
2017–2018	Balıkesirspor	13	(0)
2018–2020	Denizlispor	92	(3)
2021	Adana Demirspor	4	(0)
2021–2023	Denizlispor	22	(0)
Total		356	(21)

International career
2005–2008	Netherlands U21	17	(1)
2011	Morocco	2	(0)
Medal record
Men's football
Representing Netherlands
UEFA European Under-21 Championship
Winner	2006 Portugal
Winner	2007 Netherlands
- * Club domestic league appearances and goals

Ismaïl Aissati (born 16 August 1988) is a Moroccan former professional footballer who played as a midfielder.

Born in Utrecht to Moroccan parents, Aissati was eligible to represent either nation. He represented the Netherlands at U21 level, before opting to represent Morocco in 2007 instead. His first call-up for the Moroccan national team came in 2009. Sidelined by an injury however, his debut for Morocco was not until 9 October 2011. He also played on loan for FC Twente during the second half of the 2006–07 season, and Vitesse during the 2010–11 season, the year Ajax would clinch their 30th league title.

At the 2006 UEFA Under-21 Football Championship, Aissati reached the tournament all star squad, mostly playing against opponents three or four years older, Aissati himself being 17.

== Club career ==
=== PSV ===
Born in Utrecht to Moroccan parents, Aissati started playing football at a young age by joining DSO Utrecht and USV Elinkwijk before joining PSV Eindhoven in 2000 when he was twelve after being scouted before turning professional for the club in 2005. While at the youth team, Aissati revealed he travelled one hour from Utrecht to Eindhoven before learning to take a train at age fifteen. At age sixteen, Aissati was linked with a move to Barcelona and rejected the move when Barcelona came calling.

On 28 August 2005, Aissati made his professional debut in Eredivisie in a PSV win over Roda JC. Aissati also made his first UEFA Champions League appearance for PSV Eindhoven on 19 October 2005. In doing so, he became the youngest Dutch player ever to play in the UEFA Champions League, taking over from Ryan Babel, who debuted also at age 17, but eight months older. In the match against A.C. Milan he came off the bench in the 63rd minute. However, on 1 November 2005 PSV Eindhoven played the return match against A.C. Milan where he played the whole match, with Andrea Pirlo as his opponent. Then in January 2006, Aissati signed a contract with the club, keeping him until 2009. On 4 February 2006, Aissati scored his first professional goal for PSV in a 3–2 win over Roda JC, which was the club he played against on his debut. His second goal for PSV came against Willem II on 25 March 2006. In his first season, Aissati made 17 league appearances and scored two times.

However, Aissati got less playing time by making only 10 appearances and scoring his first goal of the season in a 4–1 win over Roda JC on 15 October 2006, in a match in the first half of the season, due to injuries. As a result, Aissati's first team opportunities were limited and to get more playing time on 16 January 2007, Aissati was loaned out to Eredivisie's rival FC Twente for the rest of the season. On 20 January 2007, he played his first Eredivisie game for FC Twente against RKC Waalwijk. Eight days after making his debut, Aissati scored his first goal for the club in a 3–1 win over ADO Den Haag. At Twente, his performance was received enthusiastically by the critics. Aissati was widely regarded as one of the most promising talents in Dutch football with clubs linked to sign him.

In 2007–08 season and last, Aissati returns to PSV from a loan. After returning, Aissati plays regularly, though he is not part of the starting line-up. During the 2007–08 season managerial changes happened at PSV and the third manager of the 2007–08 season, Sef Vergoossen began to hard on him, which PSV goalkeeper Heurelho Gomes criticized Vergoossen for treating him the way and also says that he did not get the trust that he needs. Having missed the half of the season, Aissati made sixteen appearances for the club and scored no goals.

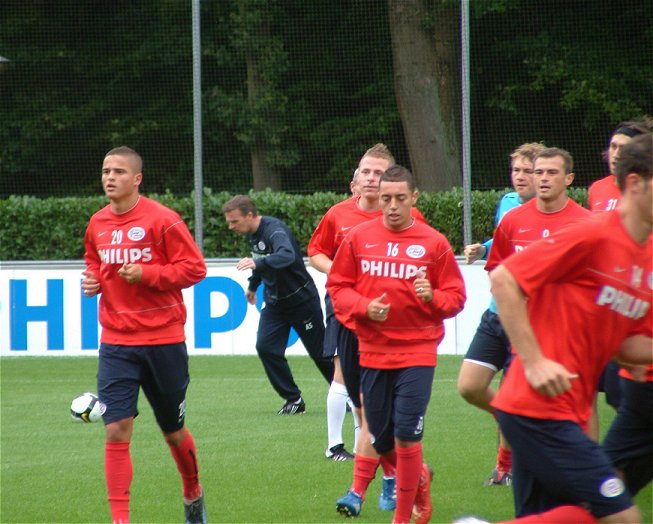
Aissati at PSV training in 2008.

In May 2008, Aissati's agent claims that he signed a new contract, which was set to expire at the end of the 2008–09 season. However, the agreement failed. Six months earlier declared Aissati for television cameras that he was still "very happy with the contract extension" and "He stayed with the club of his heart". In December 2007, Aissati signed a new deal with PSV, keeping him until 2011. In the preparation for the season 2008–09 then sends the 19-year-old Aissati to a break with PSV and in mid-July PSV and Ajax reach an agreement on the sale of Aissati.

=== Ajax ===
On 19 July 2008, Aissati agreed to sign a contract with AFC Ajax, approximately for 4 million after passing his medical. Aissati was only the fourth player in history to move from PSV to Ajax. Gert Bals, Peter Hoekstra and Kenneth Perez were the others. Following his move, Aissati was given the number 11 shirt.

On 30 August 2008, Aissati took place on the bench against Willem II but was not used - the club lost 2–1. Aisatti suffered a knee injury on 24 September 2008 and was expected to be sidelined between five and six weeks. It came after he suffered a knee injury a week before during the reserve match. However, the rehabilitation took longer than expected and Aissati did not play an official match for Ajax in the year 2008. In December Aissati trained again and played a few games with the Ajax reserves, but he took it easy to not rush anything. He made a comeback in the reserve against N.E.C. on 16 February 2009, On 22 February 2009, Aissati finally made his debut for Ajax in the 60th minute to come on for Robbert Schilder in a 2–1 draw against FC Volendam after a months of rehabilitation for his knee injury. Aisatti provided assists at his first season at Ajax and on 5 April 2009, Aissati scored his first goal for Ajax in a 2–1 win over Roda JC. In his first season, Aissati made nine appearances and scored once.

In 2009–10 season, Aissati once again began playing regularly under Martin Jol as he was no longer in the selection under Martin Jol after a cup match against NEC, Jol said that Aissati was not physically strong enough and let him run up and down the stadium stairs with Miralem Sulejmani in front of full media attention. Aisatti, once again, missed the majority of the season, due to injuries. Aissati was based player at Ajax but was told that he was the club could leave and on 4 May 2010 also gave Aissati to not be satisfied with his role at Ajax and he said the club wanted to leave so he does every week could stand on the field. Aissati made 14 league appearances and scoring three against Heracles Almelo on 30 August 2009, Heerenveen on 22 November 2009 and Vitesse on 29 November 2009.

In the 2010–11 season, Aissati played two matches against Groningen and Vitesse for Ajax before joining Vitesse on loan.

After Vitesse decided to not make the deal permanent Aissati returned to Ajax after De Boer was keen to use him in the first team following his impressive display whilst on loan at Vitesse. Aissati, himself, previously stated on returning to his parent ahead of a new season. Upon returning, Aissati, instead, played for Jong Ajax for the first three months of the 2011–12 season, before finding his place back in the first team after being recalled. Aisatti then made his first appearance of the 2011–12 season on 27 November 2011 after the away match against N.E.C. in Nijmegen, coming on as a substitute for Lorenzo Ebecilio in the 65th minute, with a 3–0 win. On 25 March 2012, Aissati scored his first goal of the season when he scored a spectacular curling effort from the corner in a vital 2–0 win against his former club, PSV. After a week being sidelined with a flu, Aissati scored on his return on 11 April 2012, in a 5–0 win over Heerveneen. Aissati finished the 2011–12 season, making sixteen appearances and scoring twice.

As his contract set to expire in summer 2012, Aissati as revealed that he wants to leave the club after his contract expires in the summer as he set his sights on a move to Spain but insists he is fully committed to Ajax and will make a decision on his future at the end of the season.

After the 2011–12 season, Aissati had expressed his interest in staying with the Amsterdam club, since his contract was expiring at the end of the season. In return Ajax offered him a contract extension of three years. However, the club could not come to terms with the players' agent Sigi Lens, who rejected the offer and demanded a higher salary, Ajax refused to make another offer, and subsequently Aissati was released from Ajax.

==== Loan to Vitesse ====
On 24 August 2010, he was loaned out once more in his career to Vitesse for the whole 2010/11 season, with an option to sign him permanently. This came after when Vitesse took interests in Aissati.

Aissati made his Vitesse debut on 29 August 2010, coming on as a substitute for Dalibor Stevanović in the 64th minute, in a 4–0 loss against Feyenoord. Four weeks later, on 21 September 2010, Aissati scored his first goals, in the third round of KNVB Cup, in a 6–0 win over Flevo Boys. Five days later on 26 September 2010, Aissati scored a spectacular goal in his first official match against Excelsior. Aissati then scored three more goals against AZ Alkmaar, VVV-Venlo and Feyenoord During which, Aissati almost returned to his parent club following the appointment of Frank de Boer, but it never happened in the end.

In most of the season Aissati was in the starting line up as a central midfielder, which by the end of 2010–11 season Aissati had scored four goals in 29 league matches for the side from Arnhem. Aissati missed two matches between 20 and 26 February 2011, due to suspension. On 7 June 2011, it was announced that Vitesse wanted to purchase the player for €1.5 million from Ajax. The transfer could only be completed by reaching an agreement with Assaiti, which they could not. In which, Aissati returned to Ajax.

=== Antalyaspor ===
After being released by Ajax, Aissati returned to Vitesse on trial on 2 July 2012. On 16 July 2012, Aissati re-signed with Vitesse on a multi-year contract, previously playing for them on loan in 2010 and took up the number 7 shirt. Aissati was expected to make his debut in Europa League Second qualifying round against Bulgarian side Lokomotiv Plovdiv but he was not eligible to play. Not having come to terms however with Vitesse, as the Arnhem side would not meet his salary demands, Aissati signed with Turkish side Antalyaspor instead, now playing in the Turkish Süper Lig.

On 27 August 2012 he made his debut, coming on as a substitute for Emrah Başsan in the 81st minute, in the 3–0 win at home against Kayserispor. A month later, on 26 September 2012, Aissati scored his first Antalyaspor goal, from a penalty spot and provided two assist, in a 5–3 win over Menemen Belediyespor. Aissatti then scored his first league goal for the club on 20 October 2012, in a 4–2 win over Sivasspor. Weeks later on 10 November 2012, Aissati scored his second league goal, in a 1–1 draw against Kasımpaşa. Two weeks later, on 24 November 2012, Aissati's third goal came in a 1–1 draw against Bursaspor. Aissati later added one more goal in the Turkish Cup against Mersin İdmanyurdu on 20 December 2012. Throughout his first season at Antalyaspor, Aissati went on to make thirty–eight appearances and scoring five times in all competitions for the club.

Aissati made two more appearances in the 2013–14 season before leaving Turkey for Russia. The summer transfer window saw Aissati attracted interests from clubs based in top division in Russia.

=== Terek Grozny ===
On 2 September 2013, it was announced that Ismaïl Aissati had signed with Russian club FC Terek Grozny on a three-year contract, with Antalyaspor receiving a reported €3 million as a transfer fee.

Two weeks later on 14 September 2013, Aissati made his Terek Grozny debut in away match, where he made his first start in attacking midfield, in a 2–0 loss against Zenit Saint Petersburg. A week later, on 25 September 2013, Aissati provided assist for Maurício, in a 3–1 loss against Kuban Krasnodar. Having spent the majority of the season on the substitute bench in his first season, Aissati made fifteen appearances in all competitions. He struggled in Grozny for the first six months before finally settling in the country. Aissati also settled in the country by learning a new language during his time there.

In the 2014–15 season, Aissati remained in the first team spotlight at Terek Grozny and scored his first goal for the club in the second round of Russian Cup, in a 2–1 loss against Gazovik Orenburg. His impressive display in October led Terek Grozny nominated him as the Player of the Month, but lost out to his teammate, Oleg Ivanov. Nevertheless, Aissatti continued to remain in the first team spotlight, as he went on to make twenty-five appearances in all competition.

In the 2015–16 season, Aissati started the season well when he provided assist for Igor Lebedenko, in a 1–1 draw against Rostov. A month later on 28 August 2015, Aissati scored his first Terek Grozny league goal, in a 3–3 draw against Ural. Throughout the 2015–16 season, Aissatti continued to remain in the first team spotlight, as he went on to make thirty-one appearances in all competition.

Having been rumoured return to Turkey, it was announced on 14 June 2016 that Aissati was released by the club. The club's management were keen on extending Aissati's contract.

=== Later career ===
In the summer of 2016, Aissati returned to Turkey where he would play for Alanyaspor. He would then sign with Denizlispor after having played for Balıkesirspor, in January 2018. In January 2021, Aissati moved to Adana Demirspor. In March 2021, his contract there was terminated by mutual consent and he returned to the Netherlands.

== International career ==
=== Netherlands youth squads ===
Aissanti previously represent Netherlands U15, Netherlands U16 and Netherlands U17. He was part of the team winning 2006 UEFA European Under-21 Football Championship. In 2007, he was also part of the team that defended their title for the 2007 UEFA European Under-21 Football Championship held in the Netherlands. Aissati played in the first match, in a 1–0 win against Israel U21, but was substituted in the first half by Otman Bakkal due to an injury.

After the Dutch win over Portugal 2–1, they secured a semi final spot and a qualification for the 2008 Summer Olympics, as well as reaching the finals after eliminating England after a 1–1 draw with 13–12 in a penalty shootout with 32 penalty kicks taken. The Dutch went on to retain their 2006 title by beating Serbia 4–1 in the final.

=== Morocco ===
On 20 October 2007, a Moroccan website stated that Ismaïl chose to represent the Morocco national team internationally instead of Netherlands, and that Henri Michel the coach of the will include him in the selection that will face France on 17 November in a friendly match in Paris. This, however, turned out to be a false statement. Then on 30 December 2008, the Royal Moroccan Football Federation revealed that Ismaïl Aissati would represent Morocco. However, this was denied by Aisatti, himself.

It was thought that Aissati would most likely make his debut on 11 February 2009 against the Czech Republic in Casablanca, but he was later ruled out of this match with injury. In 2011 he made his debut for Morocco on 10 August 2011 in the 2–0 away victory against Senegal in Dakar.

== Personal life ==
Aissati is a Muslim.

== Career statistics ==
Appearances and goals by club, season and competition
Club	Season	League			Cup		Continental		Total	
Club	Season	Division	Apps	Goals	Apps	Goals	Apps	Goals	Apps	Goals
PSV	2005–06	Eredivisie	18	2			6	0	24	2
PSV	2006–07	Eredivisie	10	1			5	0	15	1
PSV	2007–08	Eredivisie	16	0			3	0	19	0
PSV	Total		44	3			14	0	58	3
Twente (loan)	2006–07	Eredivisie	14	1			—		14	1
Ajax	2008–09	Eredivisie	9	1	0	0	2	0	11	1
Ajax	2009–10	Eredivisie	14	3	2	2	2	0	18	5
Ajax	2010–11	Eredivisie	2	0	0	0	0	0	2	0
Ajax	2011–12	Eredivisie	16	2	1	0	1	0	18	2
Ajax	Total		41	6	3	2	5	0	49	8
Vitesse (loan)	2010–11	Eredivisie	29	4	3	2	—		32	6
Antalyaspor	2012–13	Süper Lig	31	3	7	2	—		38	5
Antalyaspor	2013–14	Süper Lig	2	0	0	0	—		2	0
Antalyaspor	Total		33	3	7	2	—		40	5
Terek Grozny	2013–14	Russian Premier League	13	0	0	0	—		13	0
Terek Grozny	2014–15	Russian Premier League	24	0	1	1	—		25	1
Terek Grozny	2015–16	Russian Premier League	28	1	3	0	—		31	1
Terek Grozny	Total		65	1	4	1	—		69	2
Alanyaspor	2016–17	Süper Lig	12	0	0	0	—		12	0
Balikesirspor	2017–18	TFF First League	13	0	1	0	—		14	0
Denizlispor	2017–18	TFF First League	13	0	0	0	—		13	0
Denizlispor	2018–19	TFF First League	33	3	0	0	—		33	3
Denizlispor	2019–20	Süper Lig	33	0	1	0	—		34	0
Denizlispor	2020–21	Süper Lig	13	0	0	0	—		13	0
Denizlispor	Total		92	3	1	0	—		93	3
Adana Demirspor	2021–22	TFF First League	4	0	1	0	—		5	0
Denizlispor	2021–22	TFF First League	22	0	1	0	—		23	0
Career total			369	21	21	7	19	0	409	28

== Honours ==
PSV

- Eredivisie: 2005–06, 2007–08

Ajax

- Eredivisie: 2011–12
- KNVB Cup: 2009–10

Denizlispor

- TFF First League: 2018–19

Netherlands U21

- UEFA European Under-21 Football Championship: 2006, 2007
