= Asil Kaan Güler =

Turkish footballer

Asil Güler
Personal information
- Full name: Asil Kaan Güler
- Date of birth: 27 March 1994 (age 32)
- Place of birth: Turgutlu, Manisa, Turkey
- Position: Goalkeeper

Team information
- Current team: Kızılcabölükspor

Youth career
- 2011: Denizlispor

Senior career*
Years	Team	Apps	(Gls)
2011–2015	Denizlispor U21	37	(0)
2013–2015	→ Kızılcabölükspor (loan)	63	(0)
2015–2019	Denizlispor	49	(0)
2019	Vanspor	6	(0)
2020	1928 Bucaspor	10	(0)
2020–	Kızılcabölükspor	0	(0)
- * Club domestic league appearances and goals as of 21 July 2020

Asil Kaan Güler (born 24 March 1994) is a Turkish professional footballer who plays as a goalkeeper for Kızılcabölükspor.
