= İshak Çakmak =

Turkish footballer

Personal information
- Date of birth: 20 November 1992 (age 33)
- Place of birth: Muş, Turkey
- Height: 1.77 m (5 ft 9 1/2 in)
- Position: Defensive midfielder

Team information
- Current team: 1461 Trabzon
- Number: 5

Youth career
- 2003–2005: Çatalhüyük Çumra Bld
- 2005–2008: Konya Şeker

Senior career*
Years	Team	Apps	(Gls)
2006–2012	Konya Şeker		
2012–2016	Konyaspor	34	(0)
2014–2015	→ Boluspor (loan)	31	(0)
2015–2016	→ Gaziantep BB (loan)	29	(3)
2016–2017	Balıkesirspor	31	(7)
2017–2019	Boluspor	58	(4)
2019–2020	Keçiörengücü	26	(0)
2020–2021	Bandırmaspor	28	(4)
2021–2022	Ankaragücü	34	(1)
2022–2024	Iğdır	34	(3)
2024	Şanlıurfaspor	14	(1)
2024–2026	Batman Petrolspor	57	(7)
2026–	1461 Trabzon	7	(1)
- * Club domestic league appearances and goals as of 17 October 2026

İshak Çakmak (born 20 November 1992) is a Turkish footballer who plays as a midfielder for TFF 2. Lig club 1461 Trabzon.
