= Kerem Akyüz =

Turkish footballer (born 1989)

Kerem Can Akyüz
Personal information
- Date of birth: 1 July 1989 (age 37)
- Place of birth: Istanbul, Turkey
- Height: 1.73 m (5 ft 8 in)
- Position: Left-back

Team information
- Current team: Düzcespor
- Number: 39

Youth career
- 2001–2005: Karşıyaka

Senior career*
Years	Team	Apps	(Gls)
2005–2010	Karşıyaka	0	(0)
2008–2009	→ Mardinspor (loan)	6	(0)
2009–2010	→ Diyarbakır BB (loan)	38	(0)
2010–2011	Türk Telekom	29	(1)
2011–2012	Selçukspor	14	(0)
2012–2014	Adana Demirspor	55	(1)
2014–2015	Balıkesirspor	9	(0)
2015–2016	Alanyaspor	33	(1)
2016–2019	Denizlispor	88	(2)
2020	Bursaspor	13	(0)
2020–2021	Samsunspor	25	(0)
2021–2022	Gençlerbirliği	19	(0)
2022	Kocaelispor	7	(0)
2022–2023	Nevşehir Belediyespor	17	(0)
2023–	Düzcespor	5	(0)
- * Club domestic league appearances and goals as of 23 September 2023

Kerem Can Akyüz (born 1 July 1989) is a Turkish footballer who plays for TFF Second League club Düzcespor.
