= Deniz Vural =

German footballer

Personal information
- Date of birth: 11 July 1988 (age 38)
- Place of birth: Giessen, Germany
- Height: 1.85 m (6 ft 1 in)
- Position: Midfielder

Team information
- Current team: FC Gießen
- Number: 27

Youth career
- MTV Gießen
- TSG Wieseck
- VfB Gießen
- SC Waldgirmes

Senior career*
Years	Team	Apps	(Gls)
2007–2009	SC Waldgirmes	19	(1)
2008–2009	FSV Fernwald	34	(8)
2009–2011	Eintracht Frankfurt II	34	(0)
2011–2012	Eskişehirspor	0	(0)
2011–2012	→ Balıkesirspor (loan)	9	(1)
2012–2013	Balıkesirspor	40	(1)
2013–2017	Alanyaspor	69	(3)
2017–2018	Altınordu	29	(1)
2018–2019	Denizlispor	27	(1)
2019–2020	Altay	16	(1)
2020–2022	FSV Fernwald	21	(0)
2022–	FC Gießen	14	(2)
- * Club domestic league appearances and goals as of 19 November 2022

Deniz Vural (born 11 July 1988) is a German footballer who plays as a midfielder for FC Gießen.
