= Alperen Babacan =

Turkish footballer (born 1997)

Personal information
- Date of birth: 18 July 1997 (age 29)
- Place of birth: Denizli, Turkey
- Height: 1.85 m (6 ft 1 in)
- Position: Centre-back

Team information
- Current team: Bursaspor
- Number: 24

Youth career
- 2007–2011: Denizli Pamukkale Gençlikspor
- 2011–2014: Denizlispor

Senior career*
| Years | Team | Apps | (Gls) |
| 2014–2017 | Denizlispor | 40 | (5) |
| 2017–2021 | Akhisarspor | 32 | (0) |
| 2018–2019 | → Denizlispor (loan) | 47 | (2) |
| 2021–2023 | Ankaragücü | 12 | (1) |
| 2023–2025 | Gençlerbirliği | 76 | (1) |
| 2025– | Bursaspor | 10 | (0) |

International career^{‡}
| 2015 | Turkey U18 | 2 | (0) |
| 2016–2018 | Turkey U21 | 9 | (0) |
- * Club domestic league appearances and goals as of 9 November 2025 ‡ National team caps and goals as of 20:52, 28 September 2022 (UTC)

Alperen Babacan (born 18 July 1997) is a Turkish professional footballer who plays as a centre-back for TFF 1. Lig club Bursaspor.

== Professional career ==
Babacan made his senior debut with his hometown club Denizlispor in a 2–2 draw with Karşıyaka on 6 December 2014. Babacan moved to Akhisarspor on 13 July 2017 after a successful season with Denizlispor, scoring five goals from right-back throughout the season.

He made his league debut for Akhisarspor in a 4–2 loss to Galatasaray on 9 December 2017.

On 12 January 2023, Babacan joined TFF First League club Gençlerbirliği on a one-and-a-half-year deal.
