= Théo Mendy =

Senegalese footballer

Personal information
- Full name: Théodore Bernard Mendy
- Date of birth: 18 July 1990 (age 36)
- Place of birth: Dakar, Senegal
- Height: 1.80 m (5 ft 11 in)
- Position: Forward

Senior career*
Years	Team	Apps	(Gls)
2012	Sporting Praia		
2013–2015	Boavista	24	(1)
2014–2015	→ AD Oliveirense (loan)	25	(10)
2015–2017	Desportivo das Aves	65	(13)
2017–2018	Adana Demirspor	33	(8)
2018–2019	Afjet Afyonspor	11	(0)
2019–2020	Keçiörengücü	23	(2)
- * Club domestic league appearances and goals

Théodore Bernard "Théo" Mendy (born 18 July 1990) is a Senegalese former footballer.

== Club career ==
He made his professional debut in the Segunda Liga for Desportivo das Aves on 22 August 2015 in a game against Portimonense.
