= Afyon Kocatepe Stadium =

Stadium in Afyonkarahisar, Turkey

Coordinates: 38°47′30″N 30°28′47″E

Zafer Stadyumu
- Interactive map of Zafer Stadyumu
- Location: Afyonkarahisar, Turkey
- Operator: Afjet Afyonspor
- Capacity: 14,000

Construction
- Groundbreaking: 2015
- Opened: 2016

Tenant
- Afjet Afyonspor

Afyon Kocatepe Stadyumu, officially known as Zafer Stadyumu, is a stadium in Afyonkarahisar, Turkey. It opened in May 2015 and it has a capacity of 14,000 spectators. It was the new home of Afyonkarahisarspor of the Turkish Regional Amateur League. Currently it's the home of Afjet Afyonspor. It replaced the club's Afyon Atatürk Stadium.
