= Emre Uruç =

Turkish footballer

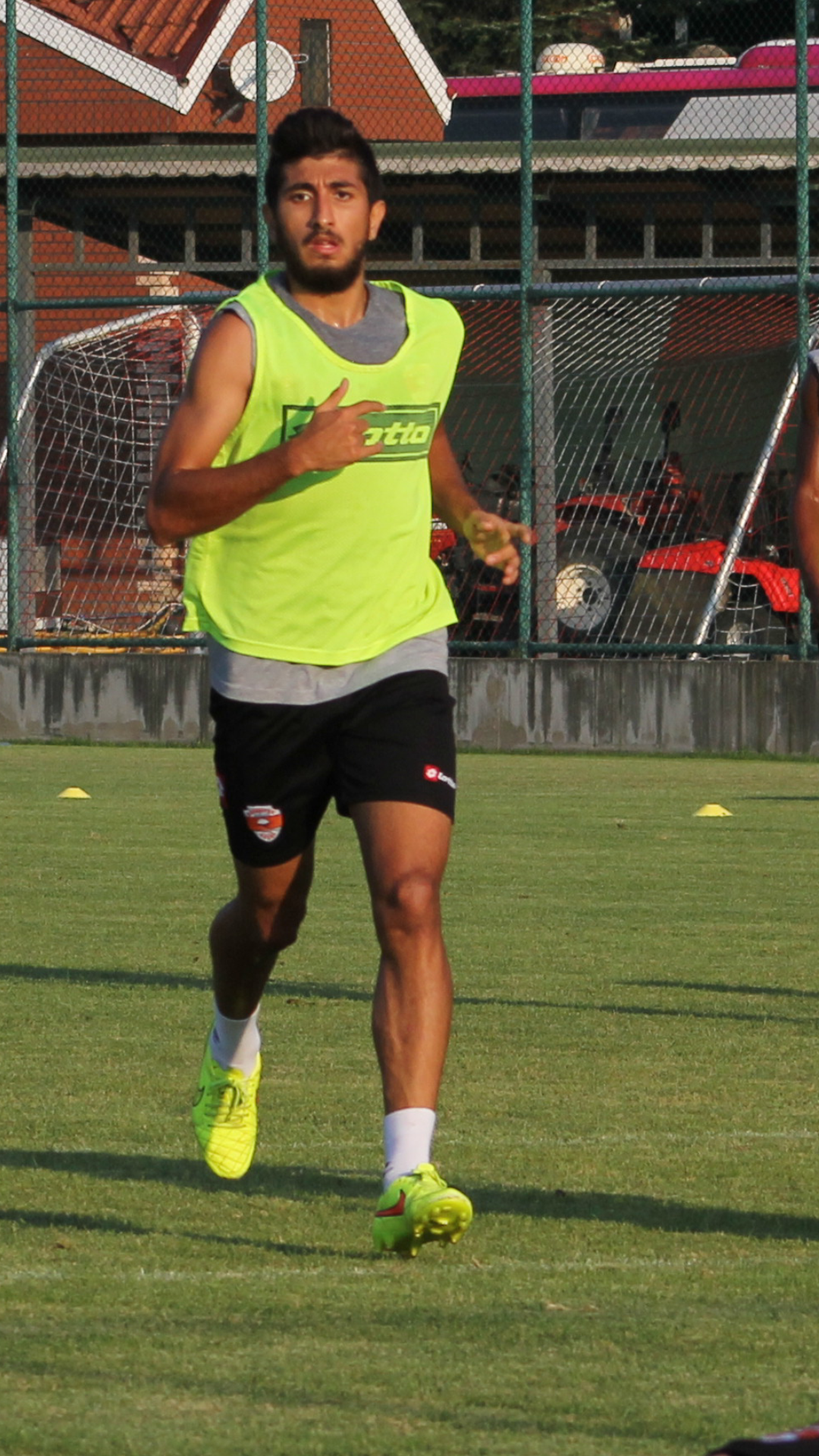
- Uruç in 2014

Personal information
- Full name: Emre Uğur Uruç
- Date of birth: 10 April 1994 (age 32)
- Place of birth: Seyhan, Turkey
- Height: 1.85 m (6 ft 1 in)
- Position: Right back

Youth career
- 2004–2010: Şakirpaşaspor
- 2010–2011: Yenibeygücü
- 2011–2013: Adanaspor

Senior career*
Years	Team	Apps	(Gls)
2013–2018	Adanaspor	71	(2)
2018–2019	Giresunspor	10	(0)
2019–2020	Adana Demirspor	7	(0)
2020	Ankara Keçiörengücü	2	(0)
2021–2022	Bayrampaşa	19	(1)
2023	Mardin 1969 SK		

International career
2015–2016	Turkey U21	7	(0)
- * Club domestic league appearances and goals as of 23 November 2022

Emre Uğur Uruç (born 10 April 1994) is a Turkish footballer who plays as a right back.
