= Wellington (footballer, born 1995) =

Brazilian footballer

Personal information
- Full name: Wellington Ferreira Nascimento
- Date of birth: 1 March 1995 (age 31)
- Place of birth: Brazil
- Height: 1.90 m (6 ft 3 in)
- Position: Defender

Team information
- Current team: Ankara Keçiörengücü
- Number: 15

Youth career
- 2010: Goiás
- 2011–2013: América Mineiro

Senior career*
Years	Team	Apps	(Gls)
2014	Vila Nova	2	(0)
2015	Trindade	11	(0)
2015	Porto B	0	(0)
2016–2017	Leixões	42	(0)
2017–2021	İstanbulspor	108	(2)
2021	Apollon Limassol	7	(1)
2022	CSA	15	(0)
2022–2023	Avaí	6	(0)
2024–2025	Amazonas	11	(0)
2025–	Ankara Keçiörengücü	18	(3)
- * Club domestic league appearances and goals as of 5 May 2026

Wellington Ferreira Nascimento, known as Wellington (born 1 March 1995) is a Brazilian footballer who plays for Turkish TFF 1. Lig club Ankara Keçiörengücü.

== Club career ==
He made his professional debut in the Campeonato Brasileiro Série B for Vila Nova on 22 November 2014 in a game against ABC.

== Career statistics ==
As of 15 July 2021

Club	Season	League			Cup		League Cup		Continental		Other		Total	
Club	Season	Division	Apps	Goals	Apps	Goals	Apps	Goals	Apps	Goals	Apps	Goals	Apps	Goals
Leixões	2015–16	Liga Portugal 2	14	0	—		—		—		—		14	0
Leixões	2016–17	Liga Portugal 2	24	0	4	1	0	0	—		—		28	1
Leixões	Total		38	0	4	1	0	0	—		—		42	1
İstanbulspor	2017–18	TFF First League	18	1	4	0	—		—		—		22	1
İstanbulspor	2018–19	TFF First League	30	0	1	0	—		—		—		31	0
İstanbulspor	2019–20	TFF First League	27	1	3	0	—		—		—		30	1
İstanbulspor	2020–21	TFF First League	33	0	0	0	—		—		—		33	0
İstanbulspor	Total		108	2	8	0	—		—		—		116	2
Career total			146	2	12	1	0	0	0	0	0	0	158	3
