= Volkan Okumak =

German footballer

Personal information
- Date of birth: 10 August 1989 (age 37)
- Place of birth: Kamen, West Germany
- Height: 1.73 m (5 ft 8 in)
- Position: Left midfielder

Youth career
- SSV Kalthof
- VTS Iserlohn
- SF Oestrich-Iserlohn

Senior career*
| Years | Team | Apps | (Gls) |
| 2008–2009 | Borussia Dröschede | | |
| 2009–2011 | Sportfreunde Siegen | 60 | (14) |
| 2011–2012 | Bayer 04 Leverkusen II | 9 | (0) |
| 2012–2013 | VfB Hüls | 15 | (5) |
| 2013 | SC Wiedenbrück 2000 | 16 | (11) |
| 2013–2016 | Kayseri Erciyesspor | 33 | (6) |
| 2014–2015 | → Sanliurfaspor (loan) | 44 | (3) |
| 2016–2019 | Giresunspor | 57 | (10) |
| 2019–2021 | Manisa | 25 | (2) |
| 2021–2022 | Pendikspor | 14 | (0) |
| 2022 | → Çorum (loan) | 14 | (1) |
| 2022–2023 | Yeni Mersin İdmanyurdu | 14 | (2) |
- * Club domestic league appearances and goals as of 20 May 2023

Volkan Okumak (born 10 August 1989) is a German footballer who plays as a left midfielder. He made his Süper Lig debut on 16 August 2013.
