= Seddar Karaman =

Turkish footballer

Personal information
- Full name: Seddar Karaman
- Date of birth: 3 January 1994 (age 32)
- Place of birth: Antalya, Turkey
- Positions: Forward; winger

Team information
- Current team: 1922 Konyaspor (on loan from Konyaspor)

Youth career
- 2007–2013: Kepez Belediyespor
- 2013–2014: Antalyaspor

Senior career*
Years	Team	Apps	(Gls)
2014–2016	Antalyaspor	5	(0)
2015	→ BB Erzurumspor (loan)	16	(2)
2015–2016	→ Anadolu Selçukspor (loan)	31	(10)
2016–2017	Anadolu Selçukspor	6	(3)
2017–	Konyaspor	0	(0)
2017–2018	→ Anadolu Selçukspor (loan)	30	(13)
2018–2019	→ Denizlispor (loan)	11	(0)
2019–	→ 1922 Konyaspor (loan)	20	(11)
- * Club domestic league appearances and goals as of 15 March 2020

Seddar Karaman (born 3 January 1994) is a Turkish footballer who plays as a forward for 1922 Konyaspor on loan from Konyaspor. He made his Süper Lig debut on 1 February 2014.
