= Ziya Alkurt =

Turkish professional footballer

Personal information
- Date of birth: 26 September 1990 (age 36)
- Place of birth: Şalpazarı, Turkey
- Height: 1.76 m (5 ft 9 in)
- Position: Forward

Team information
- Current team: Isparta 32 SK
- Number: 7

Youth career
- 2002–2006: Aydınlıkevlerspor
- 2007–2008: Akçaabat Sebatspor
- 2008–2009: Beşikdüzüspor

Senior career*
Years	Team	Apps	(Gls)
2009–2010	Sürmenespor	34	(7)
2010–2011	1461 Trabzon	14	(1)
2011–2012	Beşikdüzüspor	18	(2)
2012–2013	Bayrampaşaspor	53	(19)
2013–2015	Orduspor	37	(4)
2015	Giresunspor	7	(1)
2015–2016	1461 Trabzon	28	(5)
2016–2019	Denizlispor	89	(27)
2019–2020	Kayserispor	11	(0)
2020–2021	Altay	29	(3)
2022	Ankara Keçiörengücü	10	(0)
2022–2023	Menemenspor	25	(4)
2023–2024	24 Erzincanspor	27	(10)
2024–2025	Sebat Gençlikspor	24	(5)
2025–	Isparta 32 SK	10	(0)
- * Club domestic league appearances and goals as of 29 November 2025

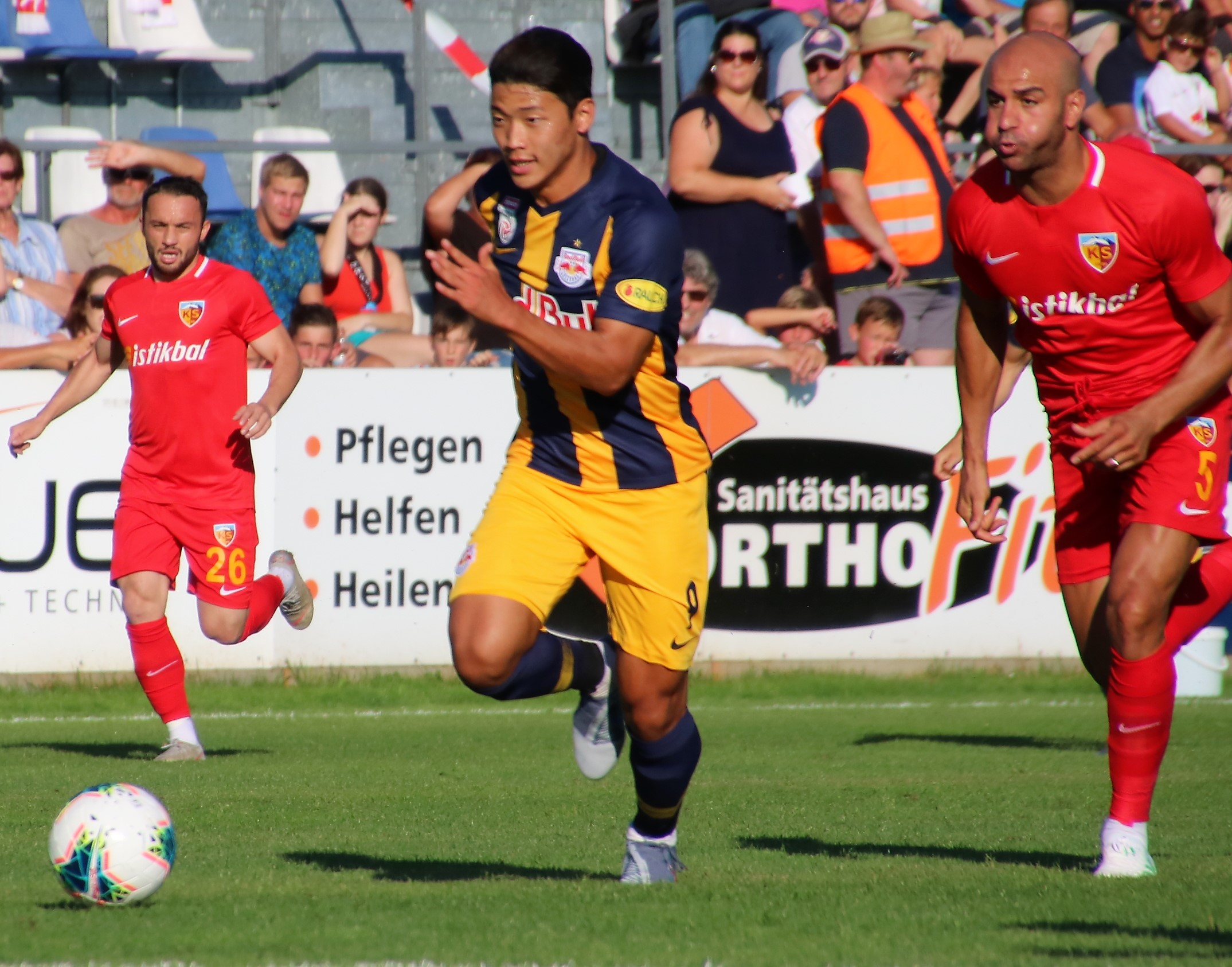
Alkurt (leftmost) playing for Kayserispor in 2019

Ziya Alkurt (born 26 September 1990) is a Turkish professional footballer who plays as a forward for TFF 2. Lig club Isparta 32 SK.

== Professional career ==
Alkurt spent most of his early career in the lower leagues in Turkey, before joining Kayserispor on 4 July 2019. Alkurt made his professional debut with Kayserispor in a 1-0 Süper Lig loss to Alanyaspor on 17 August 2019.
