= Leandro Kappel =

Surinamese footballer

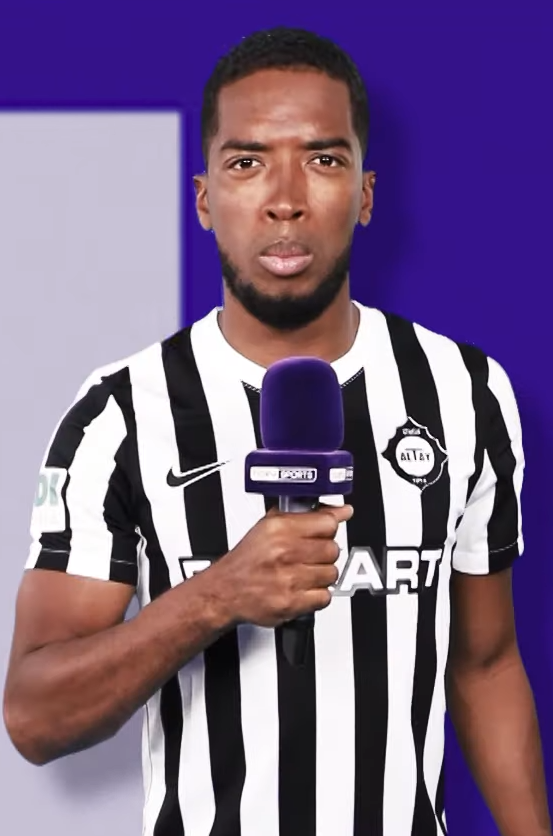
- Kappel in 2021

Personal information
- Full name: Leandro Deyrinio Kappel
- Date of birth: 14 November 1989 (age 36)
- Place of birth: Amsterdam, Netherlands
- Height: 1.83 m (6 ft 0 in)
- Positions: Striker; right winger

Team information
- Current team: SV Nieuw Utrecht

Youth career
- 1998–2001: Ajax
- 2001–2009: AFC

Senior career*
Years	Team	Apps	(Gls)
2009–2010	Volendam	0	(0)
2010–2013	Doxa Drama	52	(14)
2013–2014	Braga	3	(0)
2014–2016	Panetolikos	56	(9)
2016–2018	Denizlispor	59	(14)
2018–2022	Altay	121	(24)
2022–2025	Pendikspor	56	(14)
2025	Şanlıurfaspor	15	(0)
2026	Şanlıurfaspor	10	(0)
2026–	Nieuw Utrecht	0	(0)

International career^{‡}
2022–2023	Suriname	6	(0)
- * Club domestic league appearances and goals as of 9 August 2026 ‡ National team caps and goals as of 9 August 2026

Leandro Deyrinio Kappel (born 14 November 1989) is a professional footballer who plays as a striker or right winger for SV Nieuw Utrecht in the Eerste Klasse. Born in the Netherlands, he has played for the Suriname national team.

Besides the Netherlands, he has played in Greece, Portugal, and Turkey.

== International career ==
Born in the Netherlands, Kappel is of Surinamese descent. He debuted with the Surinamese national team in a friendly 1–0 loss to Thailand on 27 March 2022.
