= Adam Stachowiak =

Polish footballer

Personal information
- Full name: Adam Mieczysław Stachowiak
- Date of birth: 18 December 1986 (age 39)
- Place of birth: Poznań, Poland
- Height: 1.90 m (6 ft 3 in)
- Position: Goalkeeper

Team information
- Current team: Stilon Gorzów Wielkopolski
- Number: 1

Youth career
- Olimpia Poznań

Senior career*
Years	Team	Apps	(Gls)
2005	Unia Swarzędz		
2005	Jagiellonia Białystok	10	(0)
2006–2010	Odra Wodzisław	55	(0)
2006	→ Zawisza Bydgoszcz (loan)	0	(0)
2010–2012	Górnik Zabrze	23	(0)
2011–2012	→ Anorthosis (loan)	1	(0)
2012	GKS Bełchatów	15	(0)
2013–2015	Botev Plovdiv	76	(0)
2015–2018	Gaziantep BB	102	(0)
2018–2020	Denizlispor	58	(0)
2021	Altay	4	(0)
2021–2022	Denizlispor	20	(0)
2023–2024	Lech Poznań II	8	(0)
2024–2025	Unia Swarzędz	26	(0)
2026–	Stilon Gorzów Wielkopolski	19	(0)

International career
2007–2008	Poland U21	5	(0)
- * Club domestic league appearances and goals as of 12:58, 26 June 2026 (UTC)

Adam Mieczysław Stachowiak (born 18 December 1986) is a Polish professional footballer who plays as a goalkeeper for III liga club Stilon Gorzów Wielkopolski.

== Club career ==
A product of the local youth setups of Olimpia Poznań, he started his senior career with Unia Swarzędz in 2005, before making his professional debut on the other side of the country with the then second tier Jagiellonia Białystok. He then moved onto Odra Wodzisław, establishing himself as an Ekstraklasa player in his four years there.

He then had a short spell with Górnik Zabrze, who in August 2011, loaned him to Anorthosis Famagusta on a one-year deal.

Stachowiak signed a contract with the Bulgaria club Botev Plovdiv on 15 January 2013. He made his debut in A grupa on 1 March 2013 when his side beat Slavia Sofia 2–0. Stachowiak participated in all of Botev's games in Europa League during the 2013–14 and 2014–15 seasons. Stachowiak did not miss a single minute of the 2013–14 league campaign and subsequently was selected by fans as the player of the season.

Botev suffered a financial crisis at the start of the 2014–15 season. There were speculations that Stachowiak would leave the club, but he decided to remain at least until the next transfer window. He played in all four games in the Europa League and in the Bulgarian Supercup final, but remained on the bench at the beginning of the league campaign. He was again included in the starting lineup on 24 August 2014 during a 2–0 league win over Slavia Sofia. His steady performance in this game reestablished him as a first choice goalkeeper. On 27 September, he kept a clean sheet in the derby game with Lokomotiv Plovdiv, won by Botev 2–0.

At the beginning of 2015, Stachowiak demonstrated very good shape and kept a clean sheet in the first three A Grupa rounds of the year, in a 3–0 home win against Marek Dupnitsa, a 0–2 away win over Lokomotiv Plovdiv and a 2–0 home win over CSKA Sofia. On 15 March, Adam kept a clean sheet and contributed an assist for the second goal scored by Lachezar Baltanov during a 2–0 victory against CSKA Sofia. A week later, on 22 March, Stachowiak was among the key players for Botev during the 0–0 draw against Ludogorets Razgrad.

Adam did not play in two consecutive games and then returned to the starting lineup for the last game of the 2014–15 season, a 0–2 home defeat against Lokomotiv Sofia. Following the game, it was announced that the contracts of Stachowiak and his friend, the midfielder Tomáš Jirsák, would not be renewed and both of them would leave the club.

After leaving Denizlispor in 2020, after six months of free agency, he signed for another Turkish club Altay in January 2021.

On 10 March 2023, he joined his hometown club's reserve side, Lech Poznań II, on a deal until June 2024. He left the club at the end of the 2023–24 season.

On 30 August 2024, Stachowiak returned to Unia Swarzędz, playing in the fourth division.

In January 2026, after spending six months without a club, Stachowiak joined IV liga Lubusz club Stilon Gorzów Wielkopolski.

== International career ==
He has earned five caps for the Poland under-21 team.

== Honours ==
Botev Plovdiv

- Bulgarian Cup runner-up: 2014
- Bulgarian Supercup runner-up: 2014
