= Marc Kibong Mbamba =

Cameroonian footballer

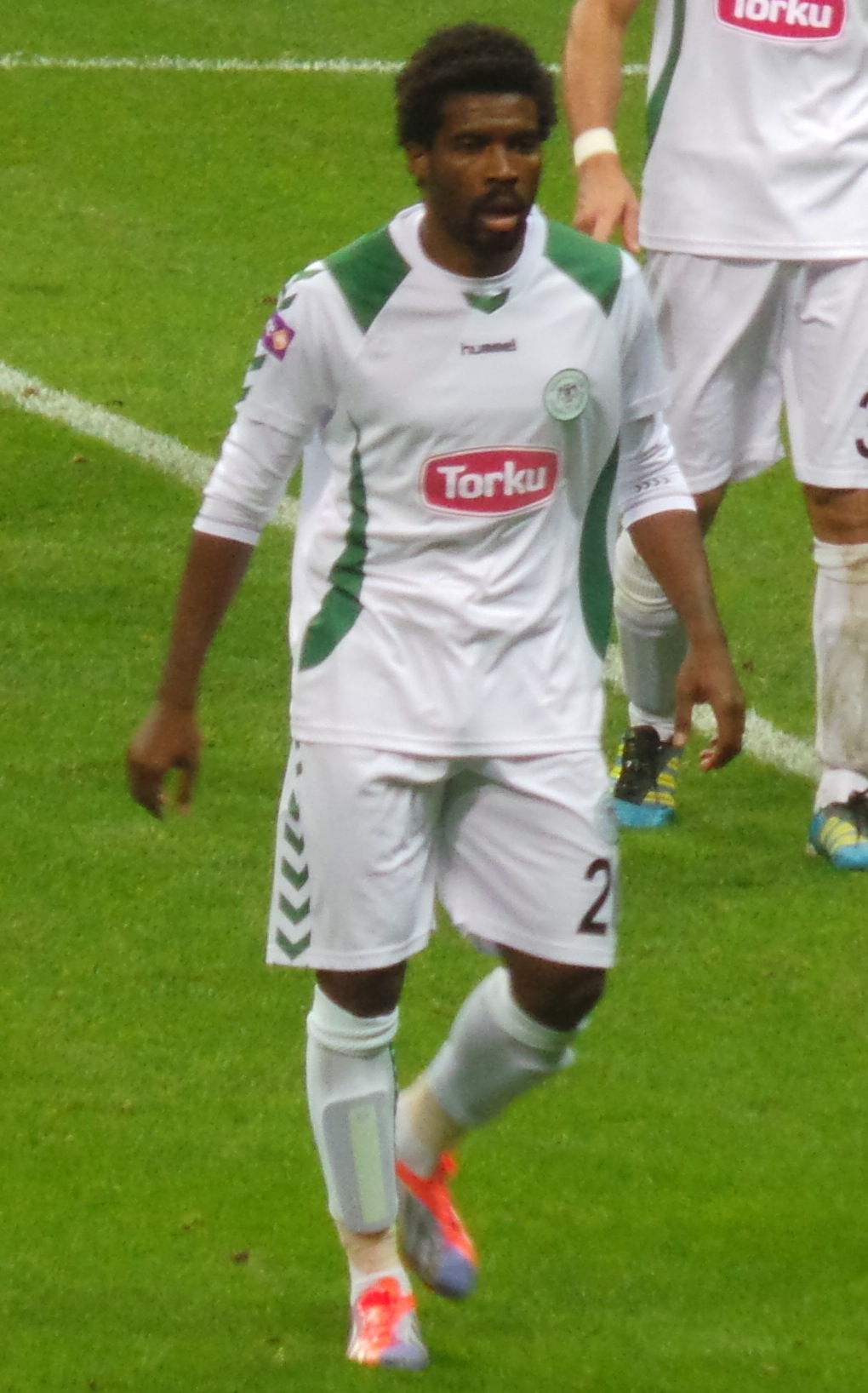

Personal information
- Date of birth: 15 October 1988 (age 38)
- Place of birth: Douala, Cameroon
- Height: 1.76 m (5 ft 9 in)
- Position: Midfielder

Senior career*
| Years | Team | Apps | (Gls) |
| 2008–2013 | Adanaspor | 138 | (12) |
| 2013–2017 | Konyaspor | 26 | (1) |
| 2014–2015 | → Boluspor (loan) | 34 | (1) |
| 2017–2018 | Ankaragücü | 16 | (0) |
| 2018–2020 | Denizlispor | 33 | (0) |
| 2020–2021 | Ankaraspor | 3 | (0) |
- * Club domestic league appearances and goals as of 3 April 2021

Marc Kibong Mbamba (born 15 October 1988) is a Cameroonian former footballer who plays as a midfielder.
