= Afjet Afyonspor =

Turkish football club

CF Afyonspor
- Full name: CF Afyonspor Kulübü
- Founded: 2013; 13 years ago
- Ground: Zafer Stadium, Afyonkarahisar
- Capacity: 14,558
- Chairman: Mevlüt Akkuş
- Manager: Turan Saltık
- Website: http://www.afyonsporfk.com/
Home colours	Away colours	Third colours

Afjet Afyonspor (2013) is a Turkish professional football club based in Afyonkarahisar, which currently competes in the TFF Second League, the third level of Turkish football.

== Current squad ==
As of 31 December 2024

Note: Flags indicate national team as defined under FIFA eligibility rules; some limited exceptions apply. Players may hold more than one non-FIFA nationality.

No.	Pos.	Nation	Player
25	GK	TUR	Recep Tayyip Kaya
99	GK	TUR	Adem Esen
17	DF	TUR	Batuhan Günsel
21	DF	TUR	Emre Dayan
26	DF	TUR	Veli Devrim Ok
77	DF	TUR	İrfan Köse
83	DF	TUR	Şükrü Kurt
94	DF	TUR	Hüseyin İçlek
6	MF	TUR	Emirhan Sefa Öz
8	MF	TUR	Muhammed Mustafa Özbay
14	MF	TUR	Ozan Asaf Doğan

No.	Pos.	Nation	Player
18	MF	TUR	Cihan Akkuş
24	MF	TUR	Hüseyin Şahin
82	MF	TUR	İsmail Mert Bayrak
88	MF	TUR	Çağdaş Arslan
10	FW	TUR	Mustafa Erkasap (captain)
19	FW	TUR	Utku Büyükköse
27	FW	TUR	Emir Aktürk
80	FW	TUR	Efe Can Özdemir
93	FW	TUR	Salih Efe Öztürk
97	FW	TUR	Mustafa Efe Çetinkaya
