= 2018–19 Akhisarspor season =

Akhisarspor
2018–19 season
- Manager: Okan Buruk (until 14 June 2018); Safet Sušić (from 30 June 2018 until 16 September 2018); Cem Kavçak (caretaker, from 16 September 2018 to 25 September 2018); Cihat Arslan (from 25 September 2018 to 14 February 2019); Cem Kavçak (from 14 February 2019)
- Stadium: Spor Toto Akhisar Stadium
- Süper Lig: 18th (relegated)
- Turkish Cup: Runners-up
- Turkish Super Cup: Winners
- UEFA Europa League: Group stage
- Top goalscorer: League: Elvis Manu (7); All: Elvis Manu (10)
- Biggest win: 3–0 v Galatasaray (Home, 23 September 2018, Süper Lig); 4–1 v Fatih Karagümrük (Away, 6 December 2018, Turkish Cup); 3–0 v Fenerbahçe (Home, 9 December 2018, Süper Lig)
- Biggest defeat: 0–6 v Sevilla (Away, 25 October 2018, UEFA Europa League)
Home colours	Away colours	Third colours

The 2018–19 season was Akhisarspor's 7th consecutive season in the Süper Lig and 49th season in existence as a football club. In addition to the domestic league, the club participated in that season's editions of the Turkish Cup, the Turkish Super Cup and the UEFA Europa League.

Okan Buruk left Akhisarspor after the club announced on 14 June 2018 that it would not continue with him following the expiry of his contract. On 30 June, Akhisarspor appointed former Bosnia and Herzegovina manager Safet Sušić on a 1+1-year contract. After Akhisarspor failed to win any of their opening five league matches, Sušić was dismissed on 16 September. Assistant manager Cem Kavçak was placed in temporary charge of the team, overseeing the UEFA Europa League match against Krasnodar and the Süper Lig victory over Galatasaray before the appointment of a new manager. On 25 September, Akhisarspor appointed former manager Cihat Arslan for a second spell in charge on a 1+1-year contract. Following a run of poor results, Arslan was dismissed on 14 February 2019, with the club announcing that it would continue under assistant manager Kavçak, who had also served as caretaker earlier in the season.

== Squad ==
Squad at end of season

Note: Flags indicate national team as defined under FIFA eligibility rules; some limited exceptions apply. Players may hold more than one non-FIFA nationality.

No.	Pos.	Nation	Player
1	GK	SRB	Milan Lukač
2	DF	BIH	Avdija Vršajević
3	DF	BIH	Edin Cocalić
4	MF	SLO	Rajko Rotman
5	MF	TUR	Bilal Kısa
6	MF	TUR	Aykut Çeviker
7	MF	POR	Hélder Barbosa
8	MF	TUR	Eray Ataseven
10	MF	TUR	Güray Vural
11	FW	TUR	Onur Ayık
13	DF	POR	Miguel Lopes
20	MF	FRA	Abdoul Sissoko
22	DF	TUR	Mustafa Yumlu
24	DF	CMR	Dany Nounkeu
27	MF	POR	Josué

No.	Pos.	Nation	Player
28	MF	NED	Elvis Manu
30	FW	COD	Jeremy Bokila
33	DF	TUR	Musa Nizam
34	MF	MAR	Adrien Regattin
35	GK	TUR	Bora Körk
37	FW	ALB	Sokol Cikalleshi
45	GK	TUR	Halil Yeral
61	DF	TUR	Zeki Yavru
66	MF	TUR	Ali Kaan Güneren
70	DF	TUR	Göksu Mutlu
77	MF	BRA	Serginho
88	DF	TUR	Caner Osmanpaşa
89	DF	TUR	Kadir Keleş
99	GK	TUR	Fatih Öztürk

== Competitions ==
=== Overview ===
Competition	First match	Last match	Starting round	Final position	Record							
Competition	First match	Last match	Starting round	Final position	Pld	W	D	L	GF	GA	GD	Win %
Süper Lig	12 August 2018	25 May 2019	Matchday 1	18th	34	6	9	19	33	54	−21	17.65
Turkish Cup	6 December 2018	15 May 2019	Fifth round	Runners-up	9	7	1	1	16	7	+9	77.78
Turkish Super Cup	5 August 2018		Final	Winners	1	0	1	0	1	1	+0	0.00
UEFA Europa League	20 September 2018	13 December 2018	Group stage	Group stage	6	0	1	5	4	14	−10	0.00
Total					50	13	12	25	54	76	−22	26.00

Source: Competitions

=== Süper Lig ===
==== League table ====
Pos	Team	Pld	W	D	L	GF	GA	GD	Pts	Qualification or relegation
14	Kasımpaşa	34	11	6	17	53	62	−9	39	
15	Göztepe	34	11	5	18	37	42	−5	38	
16	Bursaspor (R)	34	7	16	11	28	37	−9	37	Relegation to TFF First League
17	BB Erzurumspor (R)	34	8	11	15	36	43	−7	35	Relegation to TFF First League
18	Akhisarspor (R)	34	6	9	19	33	54	−21	27	Relegation to TFF First League

Source: Süper Lig, Soccerway
Rules for classification: 1) Points; 2) Head-to-head points; 3) Head-to-head goal difference; 4) Head-to-head goals scored; 5) Goal difference; 6) Goals scored; 7) Play-off.
(R) Relegated

==== Results summary ====
Overall								Home						Away					
Pld	W	D	L	GF	GA	GD	Pts	W	D	L	GF	GA	GD	W	D	L	GF	GA	GD
34	6	9	19	33	54	−21	27	4	6	7	21	26	−5	2	3	12	12	28	−16

Source: Soccerway

==== Results by round ====
Round	1	2	3	4	5	6	7	8	9	10	11	12	13	14	15	16	17	18	19	20	21	22	23	24	25	26	27	28	29	30	31	32	33	34
Ground	A	H	A	H	A	H	A	H	A	H	H	A	H	A	H	A	H	H	A	H	A	H	A	H	A	H	A	A	H	A	H	A	H	A
Result	L	D	L	D	L	W	L	L	L	W	D	W	L	D	W	L	D	L	L	L	L	D	L	W	L	L	W	L	L	D	L	L	D	D
Position	12	13	16	17	18	14	16	17	18	17	16	14	16	16	13	15	15	16	18	18	18	18	18	18	18	18	17	18	18	18	18	18	18	18
Points	0	1	1	2	2	5	5	5	5	8	9	12	12	13	16	16	17	17	17	17	17	18	18	21	21	21	24	24	24	25	25	25	26	27

Source: Worldfootball
A = Away; H = Home; W = Win; D = Draw; L = Loss

==== Matches ====
12 August 2018 1	Beşiktaş	2–1	Akhisarspor	Istanbul
21:45 TRT (UTC+3)	Pepe 39'; Babel 42'; Medel (yellow card) 59'; Uysal (yellow card) 73'; Erkin (yellow card) 90+3'	Report	Bayram (yellow card) 14'; F. Öztürk (yellow card) 28'; Osmanpaşa (yellow card) 45+2'; M. Lopes (yellow card) 52'; Seleznyov 56'; Vršajević (yellow card) 71'; Yumlu (yellow card) 90+3'	Stadium: Vodafone Park; Referee: B. Yildirim

19 August 2018 2	Akhisarspor	1–1	Çaykur Rizespor	Akhisar
19:15 EEST (UTC+3)	Seleznyov (red card) 45+3'; Yumlu 67'	Report	Fink (yellow card) 28'; Muriqi 28'	Stadium: Spor Toto Akhisar Stadium; Referee: S. Cinar

27 August 2018 3	Başakşehir	3–1	Akhisarspor	Istanbul
19:15 TRT (UTC+3)	Višća 9'; Caiçara (yellow card) 57'; Da Costa (yellow card) 67', (goal) 90'; Bajić 70'	Report	Manu 28', (yellow card) 67'; Kısa (yellow card) 40'; Çeviker (yellow card) 44'; Sissoko (yellow card) 86'	Stadium: Başakşehir Fatih Terim Stadium; Referee: A. Palabiyik

1 September 2018 4	Akhisarspor	1–1	Sivasspor	Akhisar
19:15 TRT (UTC+3)	Güler (yellow card) 79'; Regattin 82'	Report	Kılınç (yellow card) 5'; Koné 46'; Çiftçi (yellow card) 78'; Papp (yellow card) 90'	Stadium: Spor Toto Akhisar Stadium; Referee: S. Bahattin

15 September 2018 5	Ankaragücü	1–0	Akhisarspor	Ankara
17:00 TRT (UTC+3)	El Kabir 12'; Dja Djédjé (yellow card) 40'; Bifouma (yellow card) 90'	Report	Nounkeu (yellow card) 39'; Josué (yellow card) 82'; Ayık (yellow card) 88'	Stadium: Ankara 19 Mayıs Stadium

23 September 2018 6	Akhisarspor	3–0	Galatasaray	Akhisar
19:00 TRT (UTC+3)	Serginho (yellow card) 42'; Vural (yellow card) 44', (goal) 80' (pen.); Manu 51'; Regattin (yellow card) 53'; Yumlu (yellow card) 59', (goal) 84'	Report	Ndiaye (yellow card) 31'; Rodrigues (penalty missed) 43'; Muslera (yellow card) 60'; Aziz (yellow card) 83'	Stadium: Spor Toto Akhisar Stadium; Referee: Y. K. Ugurlu

29 September 2018 7	Alanyaspor	2–1	Akhisarspor	Alanya
16:00 TRT (UTC+3)	Cissé 7', (yellow card) 90+2'; Sackey (yellow card) 41' (yellow-red card) 69'; Villafáñez (penalty missed) 56'; J. Fernandes 83'; Yalçıner (yellow card) 90+4'	Report	Vršajević (yellow card) 20'; Seleznyov (yellow card) 80', (goal) 90+1'	Stadium: Bahçeşehir Okulları Stadium; Referee: A. Kardesler

7 October 2018 8	Akhisarspor	1–3	Trabzonspor	Akhisar
19:00 TRT (UTC+3)	Nounkeu (yellow card) 66'; Seleznyov 77' (pen.)	Report	Sosa 35'; Touré (yellow card) 39'; Yılmaz 43' (pen.), (yellow card) 76'; Novák 67'; Pereira (yellow card) 79'	Stadium: Spor Toto Akhisar Stadium; Referee: H. U. Meler

20 October 2018 9	Kasımpaşa	5–0	Akhisarspor	Istanbul
13:30 TRT (UTC+3)	Diagne (yellow card) 45+1', (goal) 67', 70'; Trézéguet 56'; Serbest 58'; Eduok 78'	Report	Yumlu (yellow card) 23'; Vural (yellow card) 84'; Regattin (yellow card) 86'	Stadium: Recep Tayyip Erdoğan Stadium; Referee: S. Arslanboga

29 October 2018 10	Akhisarspor	1–0	Göztepe	Akhisar
20:00 TRT (UTC+3)	Josué 3'; Barbosa (yellow card) 25'; Vural (yellow card) 54'; M. Lopes (yellow card) 90+3'	Report	Gassama (yellow card) 11'; A. Öztürk (yellow card) 31'; Poko (yellow card) 61'; Beto (yellow card) 89'	Stadium: Spor Toto Akhisar Stadium; Referee: M. Ogretmenoglu

3 November 2018 11	Akhisarspor	1–1	BB Erzurumspor	Akhisar
16:00 TRT (UTC+3)	Manu (yellow card) 37' (not on pitch); Vural 38' (pen.); Çeviker (yellow card) 51'	Report	Auremir 25'; Gör (yellow card) 76'	Stadium: Spor Toto Akhisar Stadium; Referee: M. Kalkavan

11 November 2018 12	Antalyaspor	1–2	Akhisarspor	Antalya
19:00 TRT (UTC+3)	Maicon (yellow card) 63'; Diego Ângelo (yellow card) 67'; Özmert (yellow card) 74'; Doukara 87'	Report	Barbosa 67'; Josué (yellow card) 89'; M. Lopes 90+2'	Stadium: New Antalya Stadium; Referee: A. Palabiyik

25 November 2018 13	Akhisarspor	2–4	Bursaspor	Akhisar
16:00 TRT (UTC+3)	Manu 8'; Ayık 39'	Report	Latovlevici (yellow card) 30', (goal) 85'; Nayir 45+1', 65'; Ersoy (yellow card) 75'; Keskin 90+3'	Stadium: Spor Toto Akhisar Stadium; Referee: V. Bayarslan

3 December 2018 14	Yeni Malatyaspor	1–1	Akhisarspor	Malatya
20:00 TRT (UTC+3)	Boutaïb (yellow card) 33'; Aleksić 41'; Donald (yellow card) 55'; Guilherme (yellow card) 66'; Farnolle (yellow card) 81'	Report	Sissoko (yellow card) 20'; Osmanpaşa (yellow card) 25'; Bokila 80'; Serginho (yellow card) 81'	Stadium: Malatya Arena; Referee: O. Yankaya

9 December 2018 15	Akhisarspor	3–0	Fenerbahçe	Akhisar
19:00 TRT (UTC+3)	Bokila 26'; Barbosa (yellow card) 33'; Josué (yellow card) 67'; Manu 82'; Regattin 90+4'	Report	Benzia (yellow card) 90+2'	Stadium: Spor Toto Akhisar Stadium; Referee: B. Yildirim

16 December 2018 16	Kayserispor	1–0	Akhisarspor	Kayseri
16:00 TRT (UTC+3)	Turan (yellow card) 71'; Gyan 75'; Mensah (yellow card) 87'	Report	Vršajević (yellow card) 19'	Stadium: Kadir Has Stadium; Referee: S. Arslanboga

24 December 2018 17	Akhisarspor	0–0	Konyaspor	Akhisar
20:00 TRT (UTC+3)	Ayık (yellow card) 31'; Barbosa (yellow card) 66'; Osmanpaşa (yellow card) 88'	Report	Hadžiahmetović (yellow card) 18'; Skubic (yellow card) 39'; Jevtović (yellow card) 45+3'	Stadium: Spor Toto Akhisar Stadium; Referee: A. Ulusoy

18 January 2019 18	Akhisarspor	0–3; Awarded (Note: Although Beşiktaş won the match 3–1 on the field, the Turkish Football Federation Professional Football Disciplinary Board (PFDK) subsequently awarded the match to Beşiktaş by a 3–0 score after ruling that Akhisarspor had breached player eligibility regulations by naming more foreign players on the match sheet than permitted.)	Beşiktaş	Akhisar
20:30 TRT (UTC+3)	Manu (yellow card) 25'; M. Lopes (yellow card) 65'; Cikalleshi 80'; Barbosa (yellow card) 87'	Report	Toköz 22'; Medel (yellow card) 28'; Quaresma (yellow card) 35'; Gönül 48'; Erkin (yellow card) 49'; Larin 76'; Vida (yellow card) 86'	Stadium: Spor Toto Akhisar Stadium; Referee: U. Ozturk

27 January 2019 19	Çaykur Rizespor	3–1	Akhisarspor	Rize
13:30 TRT (UTC+3)	Abarhoun (yellow card) 45'; Melnjak 70'; Muriqi 71'; Samudio (yellow card) 77'; Nakoulma 82'	Report	Cocalić 15', (red card) 20'; Osmanpaşa (yellow card) 87'	Stadium: Yeni Rize Şehir Stadı; Referee: S. Arslanboga

3 February 2019 20	Akhisarspor	0–3	Başakşehir	Akhisar
16:00 TRT (UTC+3)	Serginho (yellow card) 29'; Rotman (yellow card) 42'; M. Lopes (yellow card) 44'; Sissoko (yellow card) 47'	Report	Mossoró (yellow card) 22'; Epureanu 33'; Robinho 40'; Clichy (yellow card) 85'; Kahveci (yellow card) 86'; Ba 90+3'	Stadium: Spor Toto Akhisar Stadium; Referee: H. Gocek

11 February 2019 21	Sivasspor	2–1	Akhisarspor	Sivas
20:00 TRT (UTC+3)	Koné 5', 60' (pen.); Rybalka (yellow card) 29'; Erdal (yellow card) 81' (yellow-red card) 86'; Braz (yellow card) 90+3'	Report	Yavru (yellow card) 45'; Josué 88' (pen.); Manu (yellow card) 90+1'	Stadium: Sivas Arena; Referee: A. Palabiyik

16 February 2019 22	Akhisarspor	0–0	Ankaragücü	Akhisar
13:30 TRT (UTC+3)	Serginho (yellow card) 20'; Josué (yellow card) 65'; F. Öztürk (yellow card) 90'; Ayık (yellow card) 90+5'	Report	Orgill (yellow card) 40'; Dja Djédjé (yellow card) 41' (yellow-red card) 52'; Sak (yellow card) 57'	Stadium: Spor Toto Akhisar Stadium; Referee: H. Ozkahya

24 February 2019 23	Galatasaray	1–0	Akhisarspor	Istanbul
19:00 TRT (UTC+3)	Mariano (yellow card) 20'; Akbaba (yellow card) 31'; Mitroglou 90+4'	Report	Yavru (yellow card) 22'; Rotman (yellow card) 41'; Çeviker (yellow card) 52'; Manu (yellow card) 71'; Lukač (yellow card) 87'; Cikalleshi (yellow card) 90+3'	Stadium: Türk Telekom Stadium; Referee: S. Arslanboga

4 March 2019 24	Akhisarspor	3–1	Alanyaspor	Akhisar
20:00 TRT (UTC+3)	Rotman (yellow card) 65'; Yavru 74', 87'; Kısa 77'	Report	Gülselam (yellow card) 41'; Lukač 65' (o.g.); Campos (yellow card) 86'	Stadium: Spor Toto Akhisar Stadium; Referee: S. Tokat

9 March 2019 25	Trabzonspor	2–1	Akhisarspor	Trabzon
16:00 TRT (UTC+3)	Hosseini (yellow card) 28'; Yazıcı (yellow card) 34'; Parmak (yellow card) 62'; Çörekçi (yellow card) 66'; Nwakaeme 70'; Sosa 76' (pen.); Şahan (yellow card) 79'	Report	Serginho (yellow card) 62'; Bokila 65', (yellow card) 71'; Yavru (yellow card) 69'	Stadium: Şenol Güneş Sports Complex; Referee: Y. K. Ugurlu

16 March 2019 26	Akhisarspor	2–3	Kasımpaşa	Akhisar
16:00 TRT (UTC+3)	Manu 32'; Bokila 62' (pen.); M. Lopes (yellow card) 90+2'	Report	Koita 7'; Khalili 87'; Trézéguet 90+4'	Stadium: Spor Toto Akhisar Stadium; Referee: H. Ozkahya

7 April 2019 27	Göztepe	0–1	Akhisarspor	İzmir
16:00 TRT (UTC+3)	Agbenyenu (yellow card) 33'; Titi (yellow card) 61'; Gassama (yellow card) 86'	Report	Cocalić (yellow card) 17'; Manu (yellow card) 60'; Sissoko (yellow card) 87'; Barbosa 87'	Stadium: Doğanlar Stadium; Referee: B. Yildirim

15 April 2019 28	BB Erzurumspor	2–1	Akhisarspor	Erzurum
20:00 TRT (UTC+3)	Başsan (yellow card) 62'; Akdağ 73'; Sunu 77'	Report	Yavru (yellow card) 16'; Manu 60'; Serginho (yellow card) 67'	Stadium: Kazım Karabekir Stadium; Referee: S. Arslanboga

20 April 2019 29	Akhisarspor	1–2	Antalyaspor	Akhisar
16:00 TRT (UTC+3)	Sissoko (yellow card) 9'; Barbosa 58'; Serginho (yellow card) 70'	Report	Erdinç 7', 40'; Özmert (yellow card) 23'; Sangaré (yellow card) 45+1'	Stadium: Spor Toto Akhisar Stadium; Referee: B. Yildirim

28 April 2019 30	Bursaspor	0–0	Akhisarspor	Bursa
16:00 TRT (UTC+3)	Kara (yellow card) 60'	Report	Kısa (yellow card) 70'; F. Öztürk (yellow card) 72'; M. Lopes (yellow card) 90+4'	Stadium: Timsah Arena; Attendance: 17,222; Referee: S. Cinar

5 May 2019 31	Akhisarspor	0–2	Yeni Malatyaspor	Akhisar
16:00 TRT (UTC+3)	M. Lopes (yellow card) 34'; Kısa (yellow card) 61'	Report	Donald (yellow card) 20'; M. Lopes 50' (o.g.); Bifouma 66'; Kamara (yellow card) 80'; Büyük (yellow card) 84'	Stadium: Spor Toto Akhisar Stadium; Referee: H. Gocek

11 May 2019 32	Fenerbahçe	2–1	Akhisarspor	Istanbul
19:00 TRT (UTC+3)	Soldado 28', (penalty missed) 42'; Dirar 30'; Aziz (yellow card) 74'; Elmas (yellow card) 79'; Jailson (yellow card) 80'	Report	Vural (yellow card) 39'; Barbosa 45+2'; Bokila (yellow card) 74'; Ataseven (yellow card) 78'	Stadium: Şükrü Saracoğlu Stadium; Referee: A. Bitigen

19 May 2019 33	Akhisarspor	2–2	Kayserispor	Akhisar
16:00 TRT (UTC+3)	Regattin 37'; Nizam (yellow card) 65'; Manu (yellow card) 72', (goal) 80'; Serginho (yellow card) 90+3'	Report	T. Lopes (yellow card) 45+2'; Kravets 61'; Gyan 90+2'; Kucher (yellow card) 90+3'	Stadium: Spor Toto Akhisar Stadium; Referee: T. Kaan Numanoglu

25 May 2019 34	Konyaspor	0–0	Akhisarspor	Konya
19:00 TRT (UTC+3)	Demirok (yellow card) 49'; Fofana (yellow card) 61'	Report		Stadium: Konya Büyükşehir Stadium; Referee: A. Sansalan

=== Turkish Cup ===
6 December 2018 Fifth round First leg	Fatih Karagümrük	1–4	Akhisarspor	Istanbul
15:00 TRT (UTC+3)	Gökçe 79'	Report	Bokila 24'; Güler 54'; Regattin 64'; Larsson (yellow card) 71', (goal) 90'	Stadium: Atatürk Olympic Stadium

20 December 2018 Fifth round Second leg	Akhisarspor	2–0 (6–1 agg.)	Fatih Karagümrük	Akhisar
18:00 TRT (UTC+3)	Larsson (yellow card) 35'; Manu 73'; Bokila 90+1' (pen.)	Report	H. Öztürk (yellow card) 12'; Kuruçuk (yellow card) 41'	Stadium: Spor Toto Akhisar Stadium
Note: Akhisarspor won 6–1 on aggregate.

15 January 2019 Round of 16 First leg	Kayserispor	1–2	Akhisarspor	Kayseri
16:00 TRT (UTC+3)	Chery 78' (pen.); Türüç (yellow card) 90+9'	Report	Regattin 15'; Turan 37' (o.g.)	Stadium: Kadir Has Stadium; Referee: H. Ozkahya

22 January 2019 Round of 16 Second leg	Akhisarspor	0–0 (2–1 agg.)	Kayserispor	Akhisar
18:00 TRT (UTC+3)	Cikalleshi (yellow card) 10'; Bokila (yellow card) 64'	Report	Çinaz (yellow card) 61'; Acar (yellow card) 90+2'	Stadium: Spor Toto Akhisar Stadium; Referee: V. Bayarslan
Note: Akhisarspor won 2–1 on aggregate.

7 February 2019 Quarter-finals First leg	Akhisarspor	3–1	Kasımpaşa	Akhisar
20:30 TRT (UTC+3)	Nizam (yellow card) 37'; Cikalleshi 41', 51'; Josué 73' (pen.)	Report	Koita (yellow card) 62': Trézéguet (yellow card) 80'; Hajradinović (yellow card) 84', (goal) 90+3'	Stadium: Spor Toto Akhisar Stadium; Referee: S. Tokat

28 February 2019 Quarter-finals Second leg	Kasımpaşa	1–2 (2–5 agg.)	Akhisarspor	Istanbul
20:00 TRT (UTC+3)	Koita 37', (yellow card) 57'; Sarı (yellow card) 61'; Pavelka (yellow card) 77'; Ben Youssef (yellow card) 83'; Hafez (yellow card) 90+4'	Report	Barbosa 18'; Keleş (yellow card) 69'; Josué (yellow card) 74', (goal) 84'; Nizam (yellow card) 79'; Manu (red card) 90+4'	Stadium: Recep Tayyip Erdoğan Stadium; Referee: A. Kardesler
Note: Akhisarspor won 5–2 on aggregate.

3 April 2019 Semi-finals First leg	Ümraniyespor	0–1	Akhisarspor	Istanbul
20:00 TRT (UTC+3)		Report	Rotman (yellow card) 34'; Çeviker (yellow card) 79'; Sissoko (yellow card) 84'; Bokila 86', (yellow card) 90+6'	Stadium: Ümraniye Municipality City Stadium; Referee: A. Bitigen

24 April 2019 Semi-finals Second leg	Akhisarspor	1–0 (2–0 agg.)	Ümraniyespor	Akhisar
20:00 TRT (UTC+3)	Cikalleshi 36'; Kısa (yellow card) 53'	Report	Tekdal (yellow card) 8'; Göksu (yellow card) 16'	Stadium: Spor Toto Akhisar Stadium; Attendance: 5,000; Referee: Z. Kucuk
Note: Akhisarspor won 2–0 on aggregate.

15 May 2019 Final	Akhisarspor	1–3	Galatasaray	Sivas
20:45 TRT (UTC+3)	Rotman (yellow card) 23'; Vršajević (yellow card) 45+1'; Manu 56'; Çeviker (yellow card) 78'; M. Lopes (yellow card) (yellow-red card) 78'; Bokila (yellow card) 79'; Vural (yellow card) 80'; F. Öztürk (yellow card) 80'; Osmanpaşa (yellow card) 88'; Sissoko (yellow card) 90+3'	Report	Luyindama (yellow card) 45'; Diagne (penalty missed) 65', 90+4'; Gümüş 80' (pen.); Feghouli 88', (yellow card) 89'	Stadium: Sivas Arena; Referee: S. Arslanboga

=== Turkish Super Cup ===
As the defending Turkish Cup champions, Akhisarspor faced reigning Süper Lig winners Galatasaray in the Turkish Super Cup.

5 August 2018 Final	Galatasaray	1–1 (a.e.t.) (4–5 p)	Akhisarspor	Konya
20:45 TRT (UTC+3)	Rodrigues (yellow card) 78'; Derdiyok 79'; Aziz (yellow card) 116'	Report	Seleznyov 5'; Yumlu (yellow card) 15'; Nounkeu (yellow card) 43'; Manu (yellow card) 45+4'	Stadium: Konya Büyükşehir Stadium; Referee: C. Cakir
	Penalties
	İnan (penalty scored); Derdiyok (penalty scored); Feghouli (penalty scored); Rodrigues (penalty scored); Gomis (penalty missed)		(penalty scored) Vural; (penalty scored) Larsson; (penalty scored) Bayram; (penalty scored) M. Lopes; (penalty scored) Seleznyov

=== UEFA Europa League ===
==== Group stage ====
Pos	Team	Pld	W	D	L	GF	GA	GD	Pts	Qualification	SEV	KRA	STL	AKH
1	(Spain) Sevilla	6	4	0	2	18	6	+12	12 (Note: Head-to-head goal difference: Sevilla +2, Krasnodar –2.)	Advance to knockout phase	—	3–0	5–1	6–0
2	(Russia) Krasnodar	6	4	0	2	8	8	0	12	Advance to knockout phase	2–1	—	2–1	2–1
3	(Belgium) Standard Liège	6	3	1	2	7	9	−2	10		1–0	2–1	—	2–1
4	(Turkey) Akhisarspor	6	0	1	5	4	14	−10	1		2–3	0–1	0–0	—

Source: UEFA
Rules for classification: Group stage tiebreakers
Notes:

20 September 2018 1	Akhisarspor (Turkey)	0–1	(Russia) Krasnodar	Akhisar, Turkey
19:55 TRT (UTC+3)	Seleznyov (yellow card) 11'	Report	Claesson 26'; Kaboré (yellow card) 37'; Martynovich (yellow card) 81'	Stadium: Spor Toto Akhisar Stadium; Attendance: 6,555; Referee: Ville Nevalainen (Finland); Assistant referees: Jan-Peter Aravirta (Finland), Mika Lamppu (Finland); Fourth official: Sami Nykänen (Finland); Goal-line assistants: Petri Viljanen (Finland), Dennis Antamo (Finland)

4 October 2018 2	Standard Liège (Belgium)	2–1	(Turkey) Akhisarspor	Liège, Belgium
21:00 CEST (UTC+2)	Emond 17'; Djenepo 40', (yellow card) 90+1'	Report	Yumlu (red card) 26'; Ayık 32'; Manu (yellow card) 83'; Vural (yellow card) 83'	Stadium: Stade Maurice Dufrasne; Attendance: 8,233; Referee: Manuel Schüttengruber (Austria); Assistant referees: Roland Brandner (Austria), Robert Steinacher (Austria); Fourth official: Stefan Kuehr (Austria); Goal-line assistants: Oliver Drachta (Austria), Dieter Muckenhammer (Austria)

25 October 2018 3	Sevilla (Spain)	6–0	(Turkey) Akhisarspor	Seville, Spain
21:00 CEST (UTC+2)	Mesa 7'; Sarabia 9' (pen.); Lukač 35' (o.g.); Muriel 50'; Promes 60'; Mercado 67'	Report	M. Lopes (yellow card) 9'	Stadium: Estadio Ramón Sánchez Pizjuán; Attendance: 29,720; Referee: Kevin Clancy (Scotland); Assistant referees: Alastair Mather (Scotland), Sean Carr (Scotland); Fourth official: Graeme Stewart (Scotland); Goal-line assistants: Greg Aitken (Scotland), Euan Anderson (Scotland)

8 November 2018 4	Akhisarspor (Turkey)	2–3	(Spain) Sevilla	Akhisar, Turkey
20:55 TRT (UTC+3)	Vural (yellow card) 24', (penalty missed) 57'; Manu 52'; Ayık 78'; Josué (yellow card) 85'	Report	Nolito 12'; Gómez (yellow card) 35' (yellow-red card) 56'; Muriel 38'; Vázquez (yellow card) 41'; Promes (yellow card) 58'; Banega 87' (pen.)	Stadium: Spor Toto Akhisar Stadium; Attendance: 6,430; Referee: Benoît Millot (France); Assistant referees: Julien Pacelli, Bertrand Jouannaud; Fourth official: Benjamin Pages; Goal-line assistants: Amaury Delerue, Karim Abed

29 November 2018 5	Krasnodar (Russia)	2–1	(Turkey) Akhisarspor	Krasnodar, Russia
20:55 MSK (UTC+3)	Stotsky (yellow card) 19'; Ari (yellow card) 37', (goal) 57'; Gazinsky 49'	Report	Serginho 24', (yellow card) 67'; Sissoko (yellow card) 40'; Vural (yellow card) 90'	Stadium: Krasnodar Stadium; Attendance: 11,008; Referee: Ivaylo Stoyanov (Bulgaria); Assistant referees: Ivo Kolev (Bulgaria), Georgi Doynov (Bulgaria); Fourth official: Petar Nikolov Dzhuganski (Bulgaria); Goal-line assistants: Volen Chinkov (Bulgaria), Nikolai Yordanov (Bulgaria)

13 December 2018 6	Akhisarspor (Turkey)	0–0	(Belgium) Standard Liège	Akhisar, Turkey
20:55 TRT (UTC+3)	Serginho (yellow card) 10'; Lukač (yellow card) 75'; Ayık (yellow card) 90+6'	Report	Carcela (yellow card) 51'; Vanheusden (yellow card) 90+3'; M'Poku (yellow card) 90+6'	Stadium: Spor Toto Akhisar Stadium; Attendance: 2,674; Referee: Ádám Farkas (Hungary); Assistant referees: Balázs Buzás, Balázs Szert; Fourth official: Péter Kóbor; Goal-line assistants: Sándor Andó-Szabó, Péter Solymosi
