= List of Turkish football transfers summer 2015 =

This is a list of Turkish football transfers in the summer transfer window 2015 by club. Only transfers of the Süper Lig is included.

== Süper Lig ==
=== Galatasaray ===
In:

No.	Pos.	Nation	Player
5	MF	TUR	Bilal Kısa (from Akhisar Belediyespor)
6	MF	TUR	Jem Karacan (from (England) Reading)
11	MF	GER	Lukas Podolski (from (England) Arsenal)
12	DF	GER	Kevin Großkreutz (from (Germany) Borussia Dortmund)
14	MF	ESP	José Rodríguez (from (Spain) Real Madrid Castilla)
23	DF	FRA	Lionel Carole (from (France) ESTAC Troyes)
64	DF	BEL	Jason Denayer (on loan from (England) Manchester City)
99	GK	TUR	Cenk Gönen (from (Turkey) Beşiktaş)

Out:

No.	Pos.	Nation	Player
3	MF	BRA	Felipe Melo (to (Italy) Inter Milan)
5	DF	TUR	Gökhan Zan (Free Agent)
6	MF	SUI	Blerim Džemaili (on loan to (Italy) Genoa)
7	FW	TUR	Aydın Yılmaz (to Kasimpasa)
11	FW	POR	Bruma (on loan to (Spain) Real Sociedad, previously on loan at Gaziantepspor)
13	DF	BRA	Alex Telles (on loan to (Italy) Inter Milan)
19	DF	CIV	Emmanuel Eboué (Free Agent)
27	DF	CMR	Dany Nounkeu (to Bursaspor, previously on loan at Evian)
27	FW	MKD	Goran Pandev (to (Italy) Genoa)
38	GK	TUR	Sinan Bolat (loan return to (Portugal) FC Porto)
53	FW	MAR	Nordin Amrabat (to (Spain) Málaga, previously on loan)
94	MF	ARG	Lucas Ontivero (on loan to (Slovenia) Olimpija Ljubljana, previously on loan at Budapest Honvéd)

=== Fenerbahçe ===
In:

No.	Pos.	Nation	Player
—	FW	SVK	Miroslav Stoch (from (United Arab Emirates) Al Ain FC, previously on loan)
2	DF	TUR	Şener Özbayraklı (from (Turkey) Bursaspor)
4	DF	DEN	Simon Kjær (from (France) Lille)
6	MF	BRA	Josef de Souza (from (Brazil) São Paulo)
8	MF	TUR	Ozan Tufan (from (Turkey) Bursaspor)
9	FW	BRA	Fernandão (from (Brazil) Clube Atlético Paranaense)
11	FW	NED	Robin van Persie (from (England) Manchester United)
17	MF	POR	Nani (from (England) Manchester United)
20	FW	TUR	Volkan Şen (from (Turkey) Bursaspor)
40	GK	BRA	Fabiano (on loan from (Portugal) Porto)
53	DF	SEN	Abdoulaye Ba (on loan from (Portugal) Porto)
50	MF	SRB	Lazar Markovic (on loan from (England) Liverpool)

Out:

No.	Pos.	Nation	Player
2	DF	TUR	Egemen Korkmaz (to (Switzerland) FC Wil)
4	DF	TUR	Bekir İrtegün (to (Turkey) İstanbul Başakşehir)
9	FW	CMR	Pierre Webó (to (Turkey) Osmanlıspor)
11	FW	NED	Dirk Kuyt (to (Netherlands) Feyenoord)
20	MF	TUR	Emre Belözoğlu (to (Turkey) İstanbul Başakşehir)
21	MF	TUR	Selçuk Şahin (to (Switzerland) FC Wil)
28	FW	TUR	Beykan Şimşek (to (Turkey) Sivasspor)
29	FW	NGA	Emmanuel Emenike (on loan to (United Arab Emirates) Al Ain)
34	GK	TUR	Mert Günok (to (Turkey) Bursaspor)
8	MF	SWE	Samuel Holmen (on loan to (Turkey) Konyaspor)
99	FW	SVK	Miroslav Stoch (on loan to (Turkey) Bursaspor)

=== Beşiktaş ===
In:

No.	Pos.	Nation	Player
—	DF	SRB	Duško Tošić (from Gençlerbirliği)
—	DF	GER	Andreas Beck (from (Germany) 1899 Hoffenheim)
—	DF	BRA	Rhodolfo (from (Brazil) Grêmio)
—	MF	POR	Ricardo Quaresma (from (Portugal) FC Porto)
—	FW	GER	Mario Gómez (on loan from (Italy) Fiorentina)

Out:

No.	Pos.	Nation	Player
9	FW	SEN	Demba Ba (to (China) Shanghai Shenhua)
33	DF	TUR	Atınç Nukan (to (Germany) RB Leipzig)

=== İstanbul Başakşehir ===
In:

No.	Pos.	Nation	Player
99	MF	ALB	Sokol Cikalleshi (from (Croatia) Split)
34	MF	TUR	Cenk Ahmet Alkılıç (from Kayseri Erciyesspor)
14	DF	TUR	Bekir İrtegün (from Fenerbahçe)
25	MF	TUR	Emre Belözoğlu (from Fenerbahçe)

Out:

No.	Pos.	Nation	Player
3	MF	TUR	Sedat Ağçay (Free Agent)
11	MF	TUR	Tayfun Pektürk (Free Agent)
39	DF	TUR	Alparslan Erdem (Free Agent)
—	FW	FRA	Jérémy Perbet (on loan to (Belgium) Charleroi)

=== Trabzonspor ===
In:

No.	Pos.	Nation	Player
2	DF	NED	Douglas (from (Russia) Dynamo Moscow)
5	MF	TUR	Okay Yokuşlu (from Kayserispor)
10	MF	TUR	Özer Hurmacı (from Kasımpaşa, previously on loan)
14	FW	SEN	Dame N'Doye (from (England) Hull City)
19	MF	GER	Marko Marin (on loan from (England) Chelsea)
23	GK	CRC	Esteban Alvarado (from (Netherlands) AZ)
25	MF	CMR	Stéphane Mbia (from (Spain) Sevilla)
39	DF	BEL	Luis Pedro Cavanda (from (Italy) Lazio)
64	DF	TUR	Alper Uludağ (from Kayserispor)

Out:

No.	Pos.	Nation	Player
12	GK	TUR	Hakan Arıkan (loan return to Kayserispor)
21	DF	ALG	Essaïd Belkalem (to (England) Watford)
99	DF	TUR	Kadir Keleş (to Akhisar Belediyespor, previously on loan)

=== Bursaspor ===
In:

No.	Pos.	Nation	Player
22	DF	TUR	Erdem Özgenç (from (Turkey) Kardemir Karabükspor)
66	DF	CZE	Tomáš Sivok (from (Turkey) Beşiktaş)
17	GK	TUR	Mert Günok (from (Turkey) Fenerbahçe)
15	FW	CZE	Tomáš Necid (from (Netherlands) PEC Zwolle)
13	DF	CMR	Dany Nounkeu (from (Turkey) Galatasaray)
89	FW	SVK	Miroslav Stoch (on loan from (Turkey) Fenerbahçe)
14	MF	CHI	Cristóbal Jorquera (from (Italy) Parma)
82	DF	PER	Luis Advincula (from (Germany) 1899 Hoffenheim)
77	MF	HUN	Balázs Dzsudzsák (from (Russia) Dynamo Moscow)
9	FW	ESP	Isaac Cuenca (from (Spain) Deportivo la Coruña)
10	MF	POR	Josué (on loan from (Portugal) FC Porto)
28	DF	MKD	Sedat Berisha (from (North Macedonia) FK Shkëndija)
19	FW	BEL	Tom De Sutter (from (Belgium) Club Brugge)
21	MF	JPN	Hajime Hosogai (on loan from (Germany) Hertha Berlin)
91	MF	SEN	Ricardo Faty (from (Belgium) Standard Liège)

Out:

No.	Pos.	Nation	Player
—	FW	TUR	Colin Kazim-Richards (to (Netherlands) Feyenoord)
2	DF	ARG	Renato Civelli (to (France) Lille)
9	FW	BRA	Fernandão (loan return to (Brazil) Clube Atlético Paranaense)
10	FW	TUR	Enes Ünal (to (England) Manchester City)
8	MF	SWE	Samuel Holmén (loan return to (Turkey) Fenerbahçe)
22	DF	TUR	Şener Özbayraklı (to (Turkey) Fenerbahçe)
7	MF	TUR	Ozan Tufan (to (Turkey) Fenerbahçe)
16	MF	TUR	Volkan Şen (to (Turkey) Fenerbahçe)
94	FW	FRA	Cédric Bakambu (to (Spain) Villarreal CF)
41	FW	TUR	Batuhan Altıntaş (to (Germany) Hamburger SV)
3	DF	NGA	Taye Taiwo (to (Finland) HJK)

=== Torku Konyaspor ===
In:

No.	Pos.	Nation	Player
25	FW	BIH	Riad Bajić (from (Bosnia and Herzegovina) Željezničar)
17	MF	ALB	Alban Meha (from (Germany) Paderborn)
3	DF	CYP	Dossa Júnior (from (Poland) Legia Warsaw)
12	MF	BFA	Abdou Razack Traoré (from (Turkey) Karabükspor)
32	MF	CIV	Ibrahim Sissoko (from (Turkey) Eskişehirspor)
23	MF	TUR	Selçuk Alibaz (from (Germany) Erzgebirge Aue)
6	MF	SWE	Samuel Holmén (on loan from (Turkey) Fenerbahçe)

Out:

No.	Pos.	Nation	Player
99	FW	TUR	Hasan Kabze (to (Turkey) Akhisar Belediyespor)
44	DF	CRO	Elvis Kokalović (to (Turkey) Karabükspor)
11	MF	ROU	Gabriel Torje (loan return to (Italy) Udinese)
18	DF	AUT	Benjamin Fuchs (to (Turkey) Göztepe SK)
30	FW	POR	Djalma Campos (loan return to (Portugal) FC Porto)
17	MF	TUR	Recep Aydın (on loan to (Turkey) Karabükspor)
6	MF	TUR	Mehmet Güven (to (Turkey) Osmanlıspor)
—	GK	SVN	Vid Belec (loan return to (Italy) Internazionale)

=== Gençlerbirliği ===
In:

No.	Pos.	Nation	Player
8	MF	SWE	Panajotis Dimitriadis (from (Sweden) AIK)
14	DF	ROU	Iasmin Latovlevici (from (Romania) Steaua București)
16	MF	FRA	Guy-Michel Landel (from (Turkey) Orduspor)
22	MF	ISL	Ólafur Ingi Skúlason (from (Belgium) Zulte Waregem)
26	DF	ETH	Walid Atta (from (Sweden) BK Häcken)
30	MF	POR	Djalma (from (Portugal) Porto)
34	GK	SWE	Johannes Hopf (from (Sweden) Hammarby)
88	MF	DEN	Martin Spelmann (from (Denmark) OB)

Out:

No.	Pos.	Nation	Player

=== Gaziantepspor ===
In:

No.	Pos.	Nation	Player
12	MF	SWE	Daniel Larsson (from (Spain) Granada)
14	MF	RUS	Anton Putsila (from (Russia) Torpedo Moscow)
16	MF	TUR	Ferhad Ayaz (from (Sweden) Degerfors)
22	MF	BRA	Abuda (from (Brazil) Chapecoense)
50	DF	BRA	Marçal (on loan from (Portugal) Benfica)

Out:

No.	Pos.	Nation	Player

=== Eskişehirspor ===
In:

No.	Pos.	Nation	Player
11	MF	ARG	Matías Defederico (from (Argentina) Nueva Chicago)
13	FW	SUI	Nassim Ben Khalifa (from (Switzerland) Grasshopper)
15	FW	CHI	Sebastián Pinto (from (Chile) O'Higgins)
18	FW	GRE	Theofanis Gekas (from Akhisar Belediyespor)
19	MF	MKD	Muarem Muarem (from (Azerbaijan) Qarabağ)
94	DF	BEL	Cédric Mongongu (from (France) Evian)

Out:

No.	Pos.	Nation	Player

=== Akhisar Belediyespor ===
In:

No.	Pos.	Nation	Player
1	GK	SRB	Milan Lukač (from (Serbia) OFK Beograd)
17	FW	POR	Sami (on loan from (Portugal) FC Porto)
21	MF	CMR	Landry N'Guémo (from (France) Saint-Étienne)
23	FW	COL	Hugo Rodallega (from (England) Fulham)
89	DF	TUR	Kadir Keleş (from (Turkey) Trabzonspor, previously on loan)
90	FW	SWE	Mervan Çelik (from (Turkey) Gençlerbirliği)
99	FW	TUR	Hasan Kabze (from (Turkey) Torku Konyaspor)

Out:

No.	Pos.	Nation	Player
1	GK	TUR	Zeki Ayvaz (Free Agent)
11	FW	GRE	Theofanis Gekas (to (Turkey) Eskişehirspor)
—	MF	TUR	Bilal Kısa (to (Turkey) Galatasaray)
23	MF	BRA	Luan Scapolan (Free Agent)
39	FW	TUR	Yiğit Gökoğlan (Free Agent)
77	MF	TUR	Sertan Vardar (Free Agent)

=== Kasımpaşa ===
In:

No.	Pos.	Nation	Player
1	GK	TUR	Ramazan Köse (from (Turkey) Gençlerbirliği)
3	DF	BUL	Vasil Bozhikov (from (Bulgaria) Litex Lovech)
4	DF	BRA	Titi (from (Brazil) Bahia)
17	MF	TUR	Aydın Yılmaz (from (Turkey) Galatasaray)
22	DF	NGA	Kenneth Omeruo (on loan from (England) Chelsea)
28	FW	VEN	Yonathan Del Valle (from (Portugal) Rio Ave)
31	DF	FRA	Olivier Veigneau (from (France) FC Nantes)

Out:

No.	Pos.	Nation	Player

=== Çaykur Rizespor ===
In:

No.	Pos.	Nation	Player
1	GK	CMR	Charles Itandje (from (Greece) PAOK)
6	MF	GER	Robin Yalçın (from (Germany) VfB Stuttgart)
8	FW	POL	Patryk Tuszyński (from (Poland) Jagiellonia Białystok)
10	MF	GEO	Nika Dzalamidze (from (Poland) Jagiellonia Białystok)
16	MF	COD	Cédric Makiadi (from (Germany) Werder Bremen)
53	DF	IRQ	Dhurgham Ismail (from (Iraq) Al Shorta)
99	FW	FRA	Teddy Chevalier (from (Belgium) Kortrijk)
—	MF	NOR	Liban Abdi (loan return from (Bulgaria) Levski Sofia)

Out:

No.	Pos.	Nation	Player
53	DF	IRQ	Ali Adnan Kadhim (to (Italy) Udinese)

=== Sivasspor ===
In:

No.	Pos.	Nation	Player
13	GK	LTU	Ernestas Setkus (from (Greece) Kerkyra)
19	FW	ARG	Jeronimo Barrales (from (Greece) Asteras Tripolis)
35	MF	TUR	Yekta Kurtuluş (from (Turkey) Galatasaray)
15	DF	GHA	John Boye (from (Turkey) Kayseri Erciyesspor)
7	FW	ESP	Dani Abalo (from (Bulgaria) Ludogorets Razgrad)
4	MF	TUR	Orhan Gülle (from (Turkey) Kayseri Erciyesspor)
16	DF	TUR	İbrahim Öztürk (from (Turkey) Bursaspor)
28	MF	TUR	Beykan Şimşek (from (Turkey) Fenerbahçe)
8	MF	TUR	Hakan Özmert (from (Turkey) Karabükspor)

Out:

No.	Pos.	Nation	Player
22	DF	POR	Manuel da Costa (to (Greece) Olympiacos)

=== Kayserispor ===
In:

No.	Pos.	Nation	Player
1	GK	TUR	Hakan Arıkan (loan return from Trabzonspor)
10	MF	BRA	Diego Lopes (on loan from (Portugal) Benfica)
11	MF	NED	Deniz Türüç (from (Netherlands) Go Ahead Eagles)
33	FW	BRA	Derley (on loan from (Portugal) Benfica)
99	FW	NGA	Yakubu (from (England) Reading)

Out:

No.	Pos.	Nation	Player
—	DF	TUR	Alper Uludağ (to Trabzonspor)
—	MF	TUR	Okay Yokuşlu (to Trabzonspor)

=== Osmanlıspor ===
In:

No.	Pos.	Nation	Player
1	GK	BRA	Artur Moraes (from (Portugal) Benfica)
22	MF	ROU	Gabriel Torje (from (Italy) Udinese)
4	DF	POL	Łukasz Szukała (from (Saudi Arabia) Al-Ittihad)
48	MF	JPN	Takayuki Seto (from (Romania) Astra Giurgiu)
8	MF	BIH	Avdija Vršajević (from (Croatia) Hajduk Split)
9	FW	CMR	Pierre Webo (from (Turkey) Fenerbahce)
10	MF	SEN	Papa Alioune Ndiaye (from (Norway) Bodø/Glimt)
6	MF	TUR	Mehmet Guven (from (Turkey) Konyaspor)
15	MF	POR	Tiago Miguel Baía Pinto (from (Portugal) Rio Ave)
30	MF	NGA	Aminu Umar (from (Turkey) Samsunspor)
24	FW	ROU	Raul Rusescu (from (Spain) Sevilla)

Out:

No.	Pos.	Nation	Player

=== Antalyaspor ===
In:

No.	Pos.	Nation	Player
9	FW	CMR	Samuel Eto'o (from (Italy) Sampdoria)
5	FW	SVN	Dejan Lazarević (on loan from (Italy) Chievo)
28	DF	CZE	Ondrej Celustka (from (Germany) 1.FC Nürnberg)
3	DF	BIH	Josip Kvesić (from (Bosnia and Herzegovina) Zeljeznicar)
20	MF	BRA	Chico (from (Brazil) Coritiba)
92	GK	ALG	Raïs M'Bolhi (from (United States) Philadelphia Union)

Out:

No.	Pos.	Nation	Player
