= 2019 Turkish Super Cup =

- Event: Turkish Super Cup
Galatasaray	Akhisarspor
1	0
- Date: 7 August 2019
- Venue: Eryaman Stadium, Ankara
- Man of the Match: Younès Belhanda
- Referee: Halil Umut Meler
- Attendance: 16,000

The 2019 Turkish Super Cup (Turkish: TFF Süper Kupa) was the 46th edition of the Turkish Super Cup since its establishment as Presidential Cup in 1966, the annual Turkish football season-opening match contested by the winners of the previous season's top league and cup competitions (or cup runner-up in case the league- and cup-winning club is the same). It was played on 7 August 2019 between the champions of the 2018–19 Süper Lig and 2018–19 Turkish Cup, Galatasaray, and the runner-up of the 2018–19 Turkish Cup, Akhisarspor. The venue was the Eryaman Stadium in Ankara.

== Match ==
=== Details ===
7 August 2019
20:45 TRT

Galatasaray	1–0	Akhisarspor
Belhanda 39'	Report

Eryaman Stadium, Ankara
Attendance: 16,000
Referee: Halil Umut Meler

Galatasaray	Akhisarspor

GK	1	(Uruguay) Fernando Muslera
RB	22	(Brazil) Mariano	(yellow card) 66'
CB	27	(Democratic Republic of the Congo) Christian Luyindama
CB	45	(Brazil) Marcão
LB	55	(Japan) Yuto Nagatomo
DM	6	(Ivory Coast) Jean Michaël Seri
DM	8	(Turkey) Selçuk İnan (c)
RM	21	(Sweden) Jimmy Durmaz		(substituted off) 81'
AM	10	(Morocco) Younès Belhanda	(yellow card) 66'	(substituted off) 90+1'
LM	7	(Turkey) Adem Büyük		(substituted off) 72'
CF	11	(Netherlands) Ryan Babel
Substitutes:
GK	34	(Turkey) Okan Kocuk
DF	5	(Turkey) Ahmet Çalık
DF	14	(Norway) Martin Linnes
DF	19	(Turkey) Ömer Bayram
MF	15	(Netherlands) Ryan Donk		(substituted on) 90+1'
MF	17	(Turkey) Yunus Akgün
MF	30	(Turkey) Atalay Babacan
MF	89	(Algeria) Sofiane Feghouli		(substituted on) 81'
FW	88	(Greece) Kostas Mitroglou
FW	97	(Turkey) Emre Mor		(substituted on) 72'
Manager:
(Turkey) Fatih Terim

GK	45	(Turkey) Gökhan Değirmenci
RB	14	(Germany) Tolga Ünlü	(yellow card) 56'
CB	3	(Bosnia and Herzegovina) Edin Cocalić
CB	20	(Turkey) Alperen Babacan
LB	61	(Turkey) Kadir Keleş (c)
DM	6	(Turkey) Aykut Çeviker		(substituted off) 81'
DM	4	(Slovenia) Rajko Rotman
RM	21	(Turkey) Burhan Eşer		(substituted off) 64'
AM	87	(Iceland) Theódór Elmar Bjarnason	(yellow card) 34'
LM	89	(Turkey) Erhan Çelenk		(substituted off) 70'
CF	2	(Bosnia and Herzegovina) Avdija Vršajević
Substitutes:
GK	1	(Serbia) Milan Lukač
DF	7	(Turkey) Musa Nizam
DF	22	(Turkey) Uğur Arslan Kuru
DF	70	(Turkey) Göksu Mutlu
DF	72	(Turkey) İlke Nelik
MF	5	(Turkey) Eray Ataseven		(substituted on) 81'
MF	19	(Turkey) Bertuğ Bayar	(yellow card) 80'	(substituted on) 70'
MF	30	(Turkey) Yavuz Serkan Özbakan
FW	9	(Turkey) Ergin Keleş
FW	11	(Turkey) Onur Ayık		(substituted on) 64'
Manager:
(Turkey) Mehmet Altıparmak
