= Eray =

- Pronunciation: Turkish pronunciation: [æˈɾɑj]
- Gender: Masculine
- Language: Turkish

Origin
- Origin: Proto-Turkic
- Derivation: er + ay
- Meaning: Man of the moon, moon man, moon soldier
- Region of origin: Turkey

Other names
- Variant forms: Eraycan, Erayhan

Eray is a masculine Turkish given name.

== Etymology ==
Eray is a combination of two Turkish words er and ay. Er is derived from the Proto-Turkic *ēr, meaning "man", but also "soldier" and "brave", while Ay comes from the Proto-Turkic *āy, meaning "moon" or "month". Together, Eray means "man of the moon", "soldier of the moon", "brave man of the moon", "moon man" and "moon soldier".

== Given Name ==
- Eray Ataseven (born 1993), Turkish footballer
- Eray Birniçan (born 1988), Turkish footballer
- Eray Cömert (born 1998), Swiss professional footballer
- Eray İşcan (born 1991), Turkish footballer
- Eray Şamdan (born 1997), Turkish karateka
