= Onurcan Güler =

Turkish footballer

Personal information
- Date of birth: 24 March 1995 (age 31)
- Place of birth: Kelkit, Turkey
- Height: 1.80 m (5 ft 11 in)
- Position: Midfielder

Team information
- Current team: Erbaaspor
- Number: 48

Youth career
- 2007–2013: İzmirspor
- 2013–2016: Akhisarspor

Senior career*
Years	Team	Apps	(Gls)
2016–2021	Akhisarspor	34	(4)
2016	→ Menemen Belediyespor (loan)	5	(2)
2016–2017	→ Bodrumspor (loan)	4	(0)
2017	→ Muğlaspor (loan)	1	(0)
2017–2018	→ Selçukspor (loan)	31	(3)
2019	→ Afjet Afyonspor (loan)	9	(1)
2019–2020	→ Zonguldak Kömürspor (loan)	25	(3)
2021–2023	Uşakspor	29	(4)
2023–2024	Vanspor FK	20	(4)
2024	Altınordu	14	(2)
2024–	Erbaaspor	46	(7)
- * Club domestic league appearances and goals as of 30 November 2025

Onurcan Güler (born 24 March 1995) is a Turkish professional footballer who plays as a midfielder for TFF 2. Lig club Erbaaspor.

== Professional career ==
Onurcan made his professional debut for Akhisarspor in a 2-1 Turkish Cup loss to Galatasaray on 17 December 2015. Onurcan spent most of his early career on loan in the TFF First League and TFF Second League with successive stints at Menemen Belediyespor, BB Bodrumspor, Muğlaspor, Selçukspor, Afjet Afyonspor, and Zonguldak Kömürspor.

== Honours ==
Akhisarspor

- Turkish Super Cup: 2018
