= Elvis Manu =

Dutch footballer

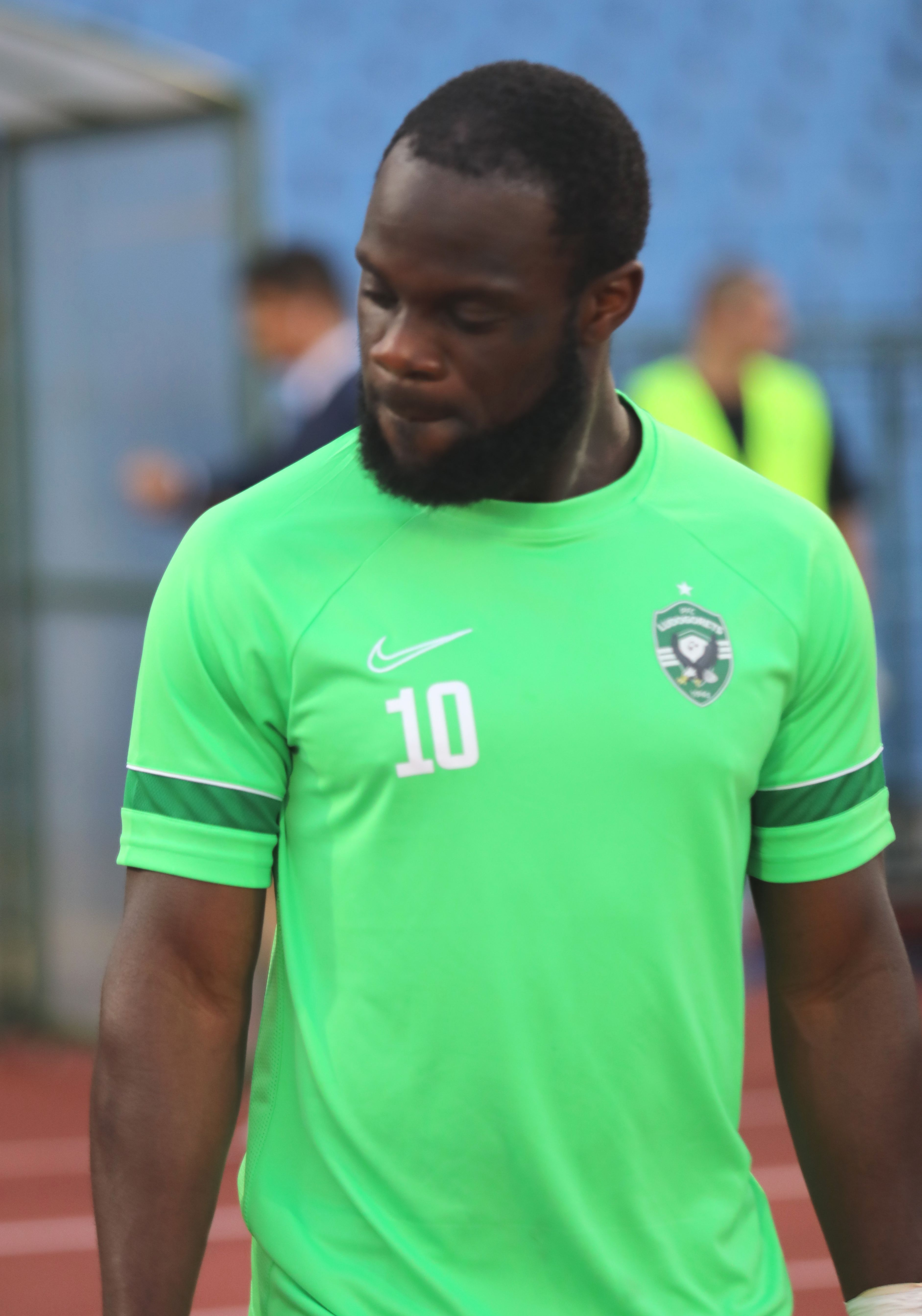
- Elvis Manu with Ludogorets Razgrad

Personal information
- Full name: Elvis Kofi Okyere Wiafe Manu
- Date of birth: 13 August 1993 (age 33)
- Place of birth: Dordrecht, Netherlands
- Height: 1.78 m (5 ft 10 in)
- Positions: Winger; forward

Youth career
- SC Amstelwijck
- SSW
- 2005–2012: Feyenoord

Senior career*
Years	Team	Apps	(Gls)
2012–2015	Feyenoord	33	(8)
2012–2013	→ Excelsior (loan)	20	(8)
2014	→ Cambuur (loan)	15	(5)
2015–2017	Brighton & Hove Albion	10	(0)
2016	→ Huddersfield Town (loan)	5	(0)
2016–2017	→ Go Ahead Eagles (loan)	14	(2)
2017–2018	Gençlerbirliği	24	(4)
2018–2019	Akhisarspor	28	(7)
2019–2020	Beijing Renhe	12	(1)
2020–2022	Ludogorets Razgrad	36	(8)
2022	Wisła Kraków	11	(2)
2022–2023	Botev Plovdiv	16	(7)
2023	→ Groningen (loan)	10	(0)
2023–2024	Universitatea Cluj	8	(0)
2024–2025	Volendam	6	(1)

International career
2008–2009	Netherlands U16	4	(1)
2009	Netherlands U17	2	(0)
2011–2012	Netherlands U19	8	(1)
2012	Netherlands U20	1	(0)
2014	Netherlands U21	3	(0)
- * Club domestic league appearances and goals as of 7 January 2025

Elvis Kofi Okyere Wiafe Manu (born 13 August 1993) is a Dutch professional footballer who plays as a winger.

Manu has represented the Netherlands from the U16 through to the U21 age group. However, on 24 June 2015, he switched his national allegiance to Ghana, whom he qualifies for through his Ghanaian heritage.

== Club career ==
=== Feyenoord ===
After progressing through Feyenoord's youth academy, Manu signed a professional contract with the club in 2012. Manu made his professional debut for Feyenoord on 26 February 2012, in a 2–3 away defeat to PSV, coming on for Jerson Cabral in the 90th minute. He scored his first professional goal for the club in a 2–3 away victory to Heerenveen, in Feyenoord's final game of the 2011–12 season.

==== Loan spells ====
After making his first appearances for Feyenoord during the 2011–12 season, Manu was loaned out to Eerste Divisie side Excelsior at the start of the 2012–13 campaign, along with 4 other Feyenoord players.

After returning to Feyenoord at the beginning of 2013–14 season, Manu was loaned out once again on 9 January 2014, joining Eredivise side SC Cambuur until the end of the season.

==== Feyenoord first team ====
After spending most of the previous two seasons out on loan, Manu broke into the Feyenoord first team during the 2014–15 season, becoming a regular for the club. Manu was on the bench in Feyenoord's first game of the 2014–15 season, a 1–2 defeat at home to Beşiktaş in the Champions League third qualifying round, Manu came on in the 65th minute for Wesley Verhoek to make his European debut. His first goal of the season came on 6 August 2014, on the return leg to Beşiktaş just seven days later, his goal came in the 74th minute, however he was unable to prevent Beşiktaş triumphing 5–2 on aggregate.

Feyenoord were thus knocked of the Champions League and demoted to the Europa League. In the Europa League play-off round, against Zorya Luhansk, Manu scored in the 90th minute to put Feyenoord 4–3 ahead and send them into the Europa League group stage for the first time in six years. Feyenoord went on to win their group, with Manu scoring in both of the matches against Standard Liège. In the knockout stages, Feyenoord faced Roma, with Manu scoring in the return leg, however Feyenoord lost 2–3 on aggregate. Manu went on to make 35 appearances and score 12 goals in all competitions for Feyenoord during the 2014–15 season.

=== Brighton and Hove Albion ===
On 29 August 2015, Manu joined Championship club Brighton & Hove Albion for an undisclosed fee. He made his Brighton debut in a 0–0 draw, away to Wolverhampton Wanderers on 19 September 2015, coming on at half-time for Tomer Hemed. He returned from his Huddersfield Town loan on 9 August 2016. In his first game for Brighton after the conclusion of his loan spell, Manu scored his first goal for the club in a 4–0 League Cup victory at home to Colchester United. Manu also scored for Brighton in his second appearance for the club in the 2016–17 season, a 2–4 League Cup victory over Oxford United.

==== Huddersfield Town (loan) ====
On 1 February 2016, Manu joined Championship club Huddersfield Town on loan until 2 May 2016. He made his Huddersfield debut as a substitute in a 2–1 defeat against Preston North End on 6 February 2016, coming on in the 78th minute for Harry Bunn.

Manu was recalled from his loan spell at Huddersfield on 30 March 2016, after he found his chances limited at the club.

==== Go Ahead Eagles (loan) ====
On 31 December 2016, Manu joined Eredivisie side Go Ahead Eagles on loan for the remainder of the 2016–17 season. On 8 May 2017, Go Ahead Eagles announced that the club has decided to end the loan of Manu prematurely due to unprofessional behavior before the game with Ajax, which was lost by 4 – 0 the day before the announcement.

=== Gençlerbirliği ===
On 10 July 2017, Manu joined Turkish side Gençlerbirliği on a two-year contract.

=== Akhisarspor ===
In July 2018, Manu signed for Akhisarspor. He made his debut in the 2018 Turkish Super Cup against Galatasaray.

=== Beijing Renhe ===
In July 2019, Manu joined Chinese Super League side Beijing Renhe.

=== Ludogorets Razgrad ===
In August 2020, Manu signed a contract with Bulgarian champions Ludogorets Razgrad. On 29 October 2020, he scored three goals in the 3:4 away loss to Austrian side LASK in a UEFA Europa League match.

=== Wisła Kraków ===
On 28 February 2022, Manu joined Polish Ekstraklasa side Wisła Kraków until the end of the season with a one-year extension option.

=== Botev Plovdiv ===
In August 2022, Manu returned to Bulgaria, signing a two-year contract with Botev Plovdiv.

==== Groningen (loan) ====
On 31 January 2023, he was loaned out to Dutch club Groningen until the end of the season.

=== Universitatea Cluj ===
On 3 October 2023, Manu signed for Romanian Liga I club Universitatea Cluj.

== International career ==
Manu has represented the Netherlands in the U16, U17, U19, U20 and U21 levels. However, on 24 June 2015, he switched his national allegiance to Ghana, whom he qualifies for through his Ghanaian heritage. He is yet to play for their national team.

== Career statistics ==
As of 21 December 2023.

Appearances and goals by club, season and competition
Club	Season	League			National Cup		Other (Note: Appearances in EFL Cup, Turkish Super Cup and Bulgarian Supercup)		Europe		Total	
Club	Season	Division	Apps	Goals	Apps	Goals	Apps	Goals	Apps	Goals	Apps	Goals
Feyenoord	2011–12	Eredivisie	4	1	–		–		–		4	1
Feyenoord	2013–14	Eredivisie	1	0	1	0	–		2 (Note: Appearances in UEFA Europa League)	0	4	0
Feyenoord	2014–15	Eredivisie	27	7	1	0	–		9 (Note: Two appearances and a goal in UEFA Champions League, seven appearances and four goals in UEFA Europa League)	5	37	12
Feyenoord	2015–16	Eredivisie	1	0	–		–		–		1	0
Feyenoord	Total		33	8	2	0	–		11	5	46	13
Excelsior (loan)	2012–13	Eerste Divisie	20	8	1	1	–		–		21	9
Cambuur (loan)	2013–14	Eredivisie	15	5	–		–		–		15	5
Brighton & Hove Albion	2015–16	Championship	8	0	1	0	0	0	–		9	0
Brighton & Hove Albion	2016–17	Championship	2	0	0	0	3	2	–		5	2
Brighton & Hove Albion	Total		10	0	1	0	3	2	–		14	2
Huddersfield Town (loan)	2015–16	Championship	5	0	0	0	0	0	–		5	0
Go Ahead Eagles (loan)	2016–17	Eredivisie	14	2	–		–		–		14	2
Gençlerbirliği	2017–18	Süper Lig	24	4	2	2	–		–		26	6
Akhisarspor	2018–19	Süper Lig	28	7	7	2	1	0	5	1	41	10
Beijing Renhe	2019	Chinese Super League	12	1	0	0	–		–		12	1
Ludogorets Razgrad	2020–21	First League	22	4	4	1	–		6	5	32	10
Ludogorets Razgrad	2021–22	First League	14	4	2	1	1	0	8	1	25	5
Ludogorets Razgrad	Total		36	8	6	1	1	0	14	6	57	15
Wisła Kraków	2021–22	Ekstraklasa	11	2	0	0	–		–		11	2
Botev Plovdiv	2022–23	First League	14	7	2	3	–		–		16	10
Botev Plovdiv	2023–24	First League	2	0	–		–		–		2	0
Botev Plovdiv	Total		16	7	2	3	–		–		18	10
Groningen (loan)	2022–23	Eredivisie	10	0	–		–		–		10	0
Universitatea Cluj	2023–24	Liga I	8	0	2	1	–		–		10	1
Career total			242	52	23	11	5	2	30	12	300	77

== Honours ==
Akhisarspor

- Turkish Cup runner-up: 2018–19
- Turkish Super Cup: 2018

Ludogorets Razgrad

- Bulgarian First League: 2020–21
- Bulgarian Supercup: 2021
