= Ömer Bayram =

Turkish footballer (born 1991)

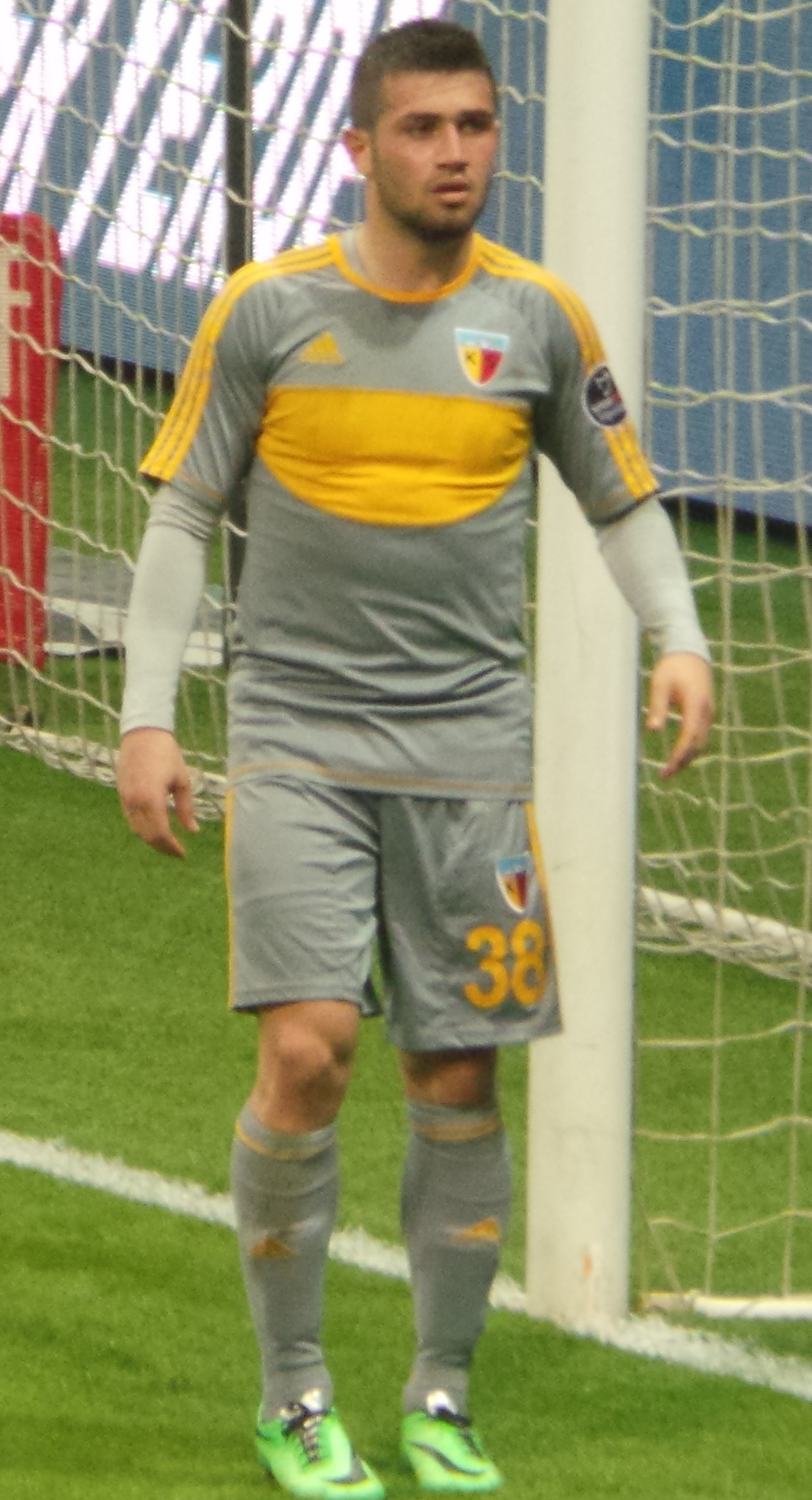
- Bayram playing for Kayserispor in 2014

Personal information
- Date of birth: 27 July 1991 (age 35)
- Place of birth: Breda, Netherlands
- Height: 1.73 m (5 ft 8 in)
- Position: Left back

Team information
- Current team: Kasımpaşa
- Number: 18

Youth career
- 2003–2004: PCP
- 2004–2005: Baronie
- 2005–2009: NAC

Senior career*
Years	Team	Apps	(Gls)
2009–2012	NAC	40	(5)
2012–2016	Kayserispor	108	(5)
2016–2018	Akhisarspor	62	(1)
2018–2022	Galatasaray	92	(2)
2022–2024	Eyüpspor	52	(0)
2024–2025	Amedspor	32	(0)
2025–2026	Sarıyer	30	(1)
2026–	Kasımpaşa	0	(0)

International career^{‡}
2009	Turkey U18	5	(0)
2012	Turkey U21	2	(0)
2012–2014	Turkey U23	12	(2)
2018–2020	Turkey	10	(0)
- * Club domestic league appearances and goals as of 18 October 2026 ‡ National team caps and goals as of 17 June 2021

Ömer Bayram (born 27 July 1991) is a professional footballer who plays as a left back for Süper Lig club Kasımpaşa. Born in the Netherlands, he represents Turkey internationally.

== Club career ==
Bayram played youth football for PCP and Baronie before moving to the youth academy of NAC Breda. He made his debut in the Eredivisie in the 2009–10 season playing for NAC in a home match against VVV-Venlo.

=== Kayserispor ===
In June 2012, Bayram left NAC Breda and signed with Kayserispor on a free transfer. He chose shirt number 38, as this is the postal code of the province of Kayseri, where his parents originally came from. Bayram suffered relegation with the club to the TFF First League in the 2013–14 season, only to promote back to the highest level after winning the second-tier title in 2014–15. He finished his fourth and final season with Kayserispor in 15th place in the Süper Lig, one spot above the relegation zone.

=== Akhisar Belediyespor ===
In June 2016, Bayram signed a three-year contract with Akhisar Belediyespor. On 10 May 2018, Bayram helped the club win its first professional trophy, the 2017–18 Turkish Cup.

=== Galatasaray ===
On 31 August 2018, Bayram signed with Turkish giants Galatasaray on a three-year contract, with the club paying a reported €400,000 for the left back. On 16 June 2021, Galatasaray announced that Bayram's contract was extended for 3 years.

On 8 September 2022, the contract between Bayram and Galatasaray was mutually terminated.

=== Eyüpspor ===
On 8 September 2022, he signed a 2-year contract with Eyüpspor.

=== Amedspor ===
The football player, whose contract with Eyüpspor expired in 2024, was transferred to Amedspor, one of the TFF 1st League teams, playing in the Turkish province of Diyarbakır, on July 26, 2024.

== International career ==
Born in the Netherlands, Bayram is a youth international for Turkey. He made his debut for the senior Turkey national football team in a friendly 2–2 tie with Montenegro on 27 March 2018.

== Honours ==
Kayserispor

- TFF First League: 2014–15

Akhisarspor

- Turkish Cup: 2017–18
- Turkish Super Cup: 2018

Galatasaray

- Süper Lig: 2018–19
- Turkish Cup: 2018–19
- Turkish Super Cup: 2019

== Career statistics ==
As of 17 June 2021

=== Club ===
Club	Season	League	League		Cup		Europe		Other		Total	
Club	Season	League	Apps	Goals	Apps	Goals	Apps	Goals	Apps	Goals	Apps	Goals
NAC Breda	2009–10	Eredivisie	4	0	0	0	—		—		4	0
NAC Breda	2010–11	Eredivisie	6	0	2	0	—		—		8	0
NAC Breda	2011–12	Eredivisie	30	5	1	0	—		—		31	5
NAC Breda	Total		40	5	3	0	0	0	0	0	43	5
Kayserispor	2012–13	Süper Lig	22	0	1	0	—		—		23	0
Kayserispor	2013–14	Süper Lig	32	0	2	0	—		—		34	0
Kayserispor	2014–15	TFF First League	25	4	5	0	—		—		30	4
Kayserispor	2015–16	Süper Lig	29	1	6	0	—		—		35	1
Kayserispor	Total		108	5	14	0	0	0	0	0	122	5
Akhisar Belediyespor	2016–17	Süper Lig	30	0	1	0	—		—		31	0
Akhisar Belediyespor	2017–18	Süper Lig	29	1	7	0	—		—		36	1
Akhisar Belediyespor	2018–19	Süper Lig	3	0	0	0	—		1	0	4	0
Akhisar Belediyespor	Total		62	1	8	0	0	0	1	0	71	1
Galatasaray	2018–19	Süper Lig	12	1	6	0	2	0	0	0	20	1
Galatasaray	2019–20	Süper Lig	29	1	5	0	5	0	0	0	39	1
Galatasaray	2020–21	Süper Lig	32	0	3	0	3	0	—		38	0
Galatasaray	2021–22	Süper Lig	0	0	0	0	0	0	0	0	0	0
Galatasaray	Total		73	2	14	0	10	0	0	0	97	2
Career total			283	13	39	0	10	0	1	0	333	13

=== International ===
Turkey national team
Year	Apps	Goals
2018	7	0
2019	2	0
2020	1	0
2021	0	0
Total	10	0
