= Fatih Öztürk (footballer, born 1986) =

French footballer (born 1986)

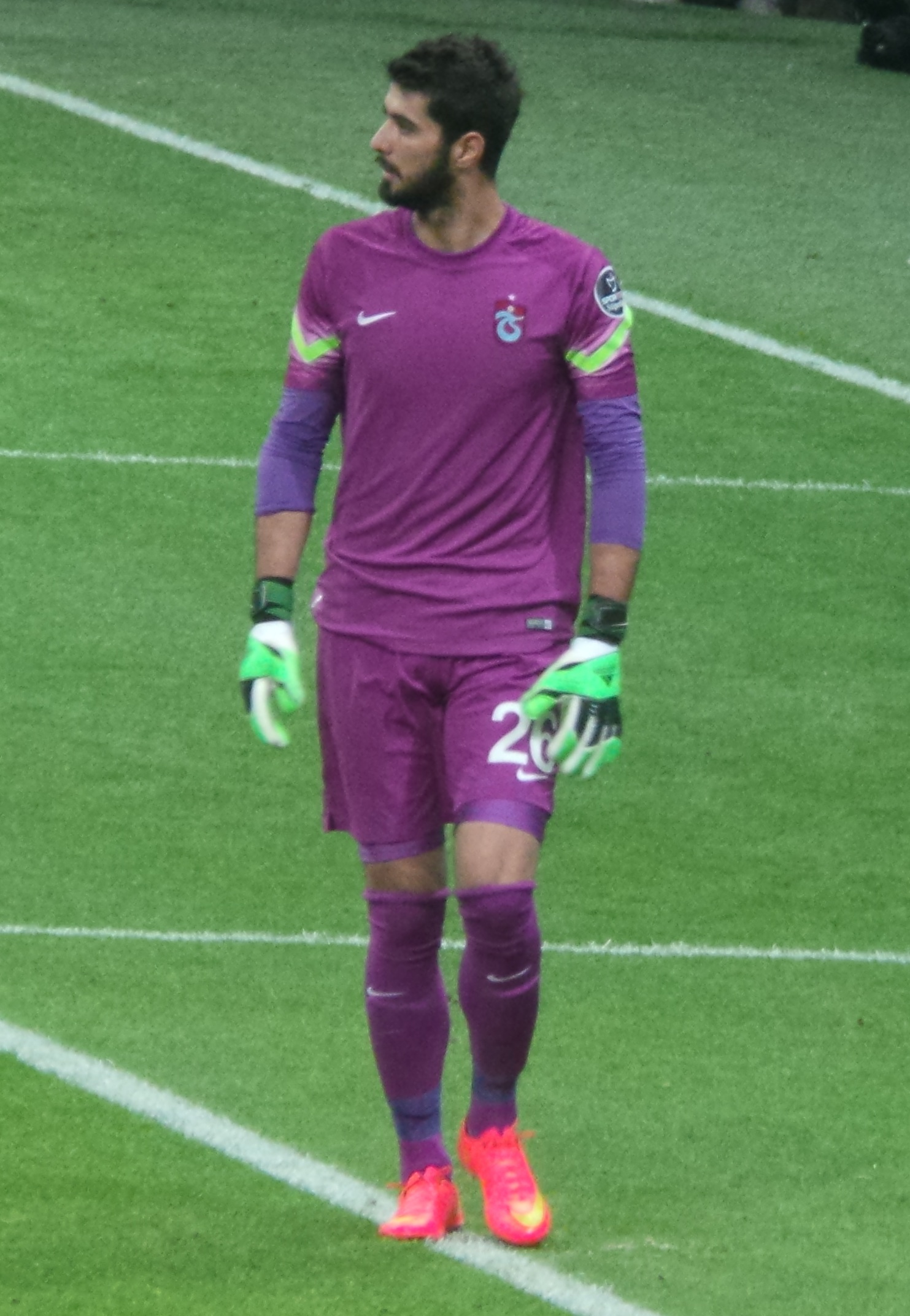
- Öztürk playing for Trabzonspor in 2014

Personal information
- Full name: Fatih Öztürk
- Date of birth: 22 December 1986 (age 39)
- Place of birth: Phalsbourg, France
- Height: 1.91 m (6 ft 3 in)
- Position: Goalkeeper

Youth career
- 1993–2007: US Sarre-Union

Senior career*
Years	Team	Apps	(Gls)
2007–2008	Yurtkur	0	(0)
2008–2011	Eyüpspor	0	(0)
2010–2011	→ Gölcükspor (loan)	33	(2)
2011–2013	1461 Trabzon	64	(0)
2013–2015	Trabzonspor	11	(0)
2015–2019	Akhisar Belediyespor	51	(0)
2019–2020	Kasımpaşa	20	(0)
2020–2022	Galatasaray	9	(0)
Total		188	(2)
- * Club domestic league appearances and goals

Fatih Öztürk (born 22 December 1986) is a French former professional footballer who played as a goalkeeper.

== Career ==
On 10 May 2018, Öztürk helped Akhisar Belediyespor win their first professional trophy, the 2017–18 Turkish Cup.

On 17 June 2019 he signed a two-year contract with another Süper Lig side, Kasımpaşa.

== Honours ==
Akhisarspor

- Turkish Cup: 2017-18
- Turkish Super Cup: 2018
