= 2018 Turkish Super Cup =

Football competition

- Event: Turkish Super Cup
Galatasaray	Akhisarspor
1	1
- After extra time Akhisarspor won 5–4 on penalties
- Date: 5 August 2018
- Venue: Konya Büyükşehir Stadium, Konya
- Man of the Match: Yevhen Seleznyov
- Referee: Cüneyt Çakır
- Attendance: 27,000

The 2018 Turkish Super Cup (Turkish: TFF Süper Kupa) was the 45th edition of the Turkish Super Cup since its establishment as Presidential Cup in 1966, the annual Turkish football season-opening match contested by the winners of the previous season's top league and cup competitions (or cup runner-up in case the league- and cup-winning club is the same). It was played on 5 August 2018 between the champions of the 2017–18 Süper Lig, Galatasaray, and the winners of the 2017–18 Turkish Cup, Akhisarspor.

Akhisar Belediyespor won the match 5-4 on penalty kicks and won the cup for first time.

== Match ==
=== Details ===
5 August 2018
20:45 TRT

Galatasaray	1–1 (a.e.t.)	Akhisarspor
Derdiyok 78'	Report	Seleznyov 4'
Penalties
İnan (penalty scored); Derdiyok (penalty scored); Feghouli (penalty scored); Rodrigues (penalty scored); Gomis (penalty missed)	4–5	(penalty scored) Vural; (penalty scored) Larsson; (penalty scored) Bayram; (penalty scored) Lopes; (penalty scored) Seleznyov

Konya Büyükşehir Stadium, Konya
Attendance: 27,000
Referee: Cüneyt Çakır

Galatasaray	Akhisarspor

GK	1	(Uruguay) Fernando Muslera (c)
CB	3	(Brazil) Maicon
CB	15	(Netherlands) Ryan Donk		(substituted off) 77'
CB	4	(Turkey) Serdar Aziz	(yellow card) 116'
DM	25	(Brazil) Fernando		(substituted off) 70'
RM	14	(Norway) Martin Linnes
LM	55	(Japan) Yuto Nagatomo		(substituted off) 102'
AM	10	(Morocco) Younès Belhanda		(substituted off) 59'
RF	89	(Algeria) Sofiane Feghouli
CF	18	(France) Bafétimbi Gomis
LF	7	(Cape Verde) Garry Rodrigues	(yellow card) 78'
Substitutes:
GK	13	(Turkey) İsmail Çipe
DF	5	(Turkey) Ahmet Çalık
DF	23	(France) Lionel Carole		(substituted on) 102'
MF	8	(Turkey) Selçuk İnan		(substituted on) 77'
MF	52	(Turkey) Celil Yüksel
FW	9	(Switzerland) Eren Derdiyok		(substituted on) 59'
FW	11	(Turkey) Sinan Gümüş
FW	21	(Nigeria) Henry Onyekuru
FW	35	(Turkey) Yunus Akgün		(substituted on) 70'
FW	88	(Turkey) Muğdat Çelik
Manager:
(Turkey) Fatih Terim

GK	99	(France) Fatih Öztürk
RB	2	(Bosnia and Herzegovina) Avdija Vršajević		(substituted off) 67'
CB	24	(Cameroon) Dany Nounkeu	(yellow card) 43'
CB	22	(Turkey) Mustafa Yumlu	(yellow card) 15'
LB	19	(Turkey) Ömer Bayram
CM	6	(Turkey) Aykut Çeviker
CM	20	(Mali) Abdoul Sissoko
RW	7	(Portugal) Hélder Barbosa		(substituted off) 63'
AM	5	(Turkey) Bilal Kısa (c)		(substituted off) 99'
LW	28	(Netherlands) Elvis Manu	(yellow card) 45+4'	(substituted off) 77'
CF	9	(Ukraine) Yevhen Seleznyov
Substitutes:
GK	45	(Turkey) Halil Yeral
DF	10	(Turkey) Güray Vural		(substituted on) 77'
DF	13	(Portugal) Miguel Lopes		(substituted on) 63'
DF	89	(Turkey) Kadir Keleş
MF	8	(Turkey) Eray Ataseven
MF	17	(Turkey) Onurcan Güler		(substituted on) 99'
MF	27	(Portugal) Josué
MF	77	(Brazil) Serginho
FW	11	(Turkey) Onur Ayık
FW	31	(Sweden) Daniel Larsson		(substituted on) 67'
Manager:
(Bosnia and Herzegovina) Safet Sušić
