= Spor Toto Akhisar Stadium =

Stadium in Akhisar, Turkey

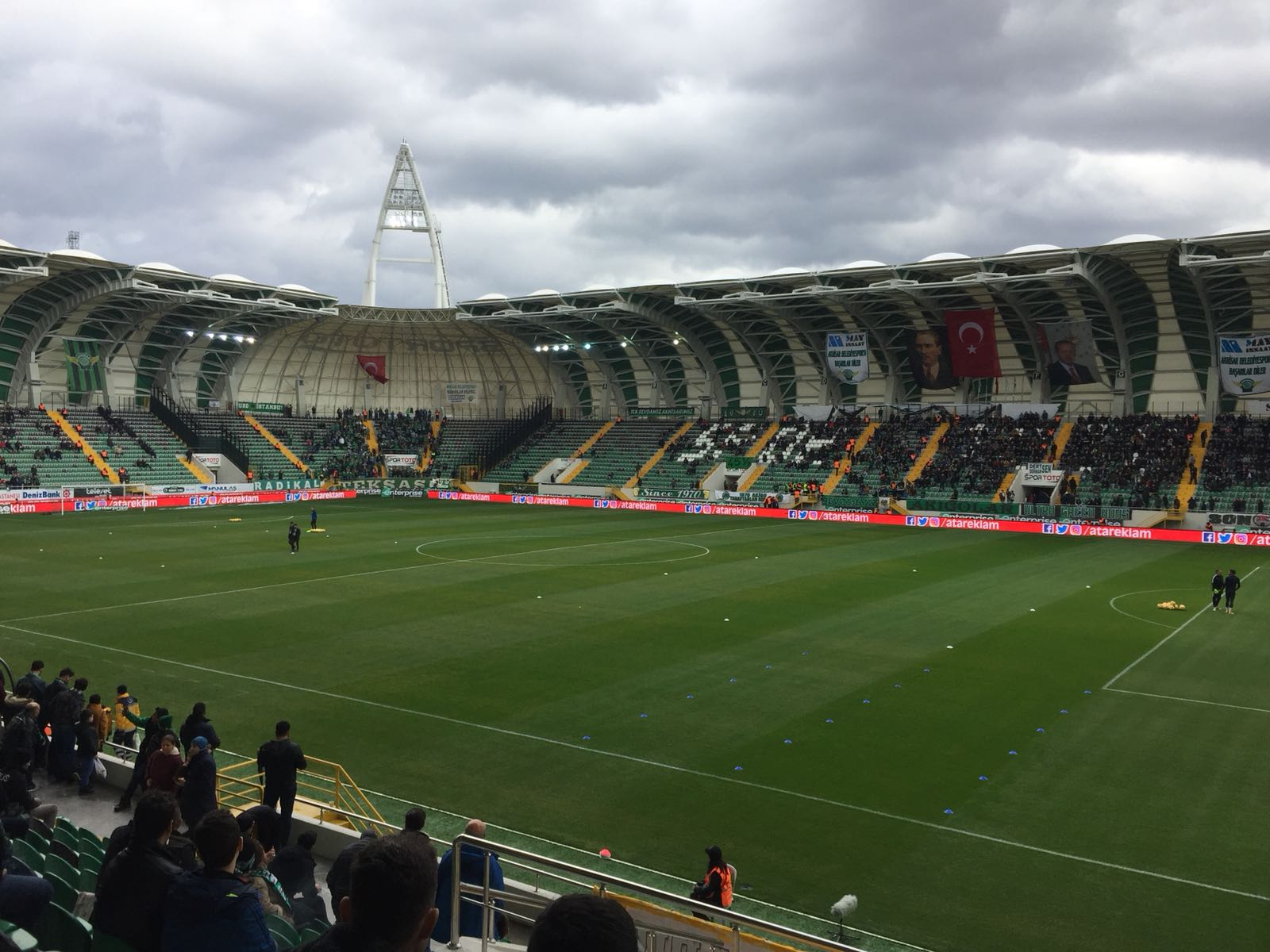
- Interactive map of Spor Toto Akhisar Stadium
- Location: Akhisar, Turkey
- Coordinates: 38°55′15.7″N 27°48′42.2″E
- Operator: Akhisarspor
- Capacity: 12,139
- Surface: 105m x 68m
- Record attendance: 10,800 (Akhisar-Beşiktaş, 13 April 2018)

Construction
- Groundbreaking: 6 March 2014
- Opened: 28 January 2018
- Cost: ₺78 million
- Architect: Adnan Kazmaoğlu

Tenant
- Akhisarspor (2018–present)

Spor Toto Akhisar Stadium, also known as Akhisar Arena, is a stadium in Akhisar, Turkey. It opened to public 28 January 2018, when Akhisarspor faced Antalyaspor in the Süper Lig. The stadium has a capacity of 12,139 spectators. It replaced Akhisarspor's previous home, Manisa 19 Mayıs Stadium.
