= Güray Vural =

Turkish footballer

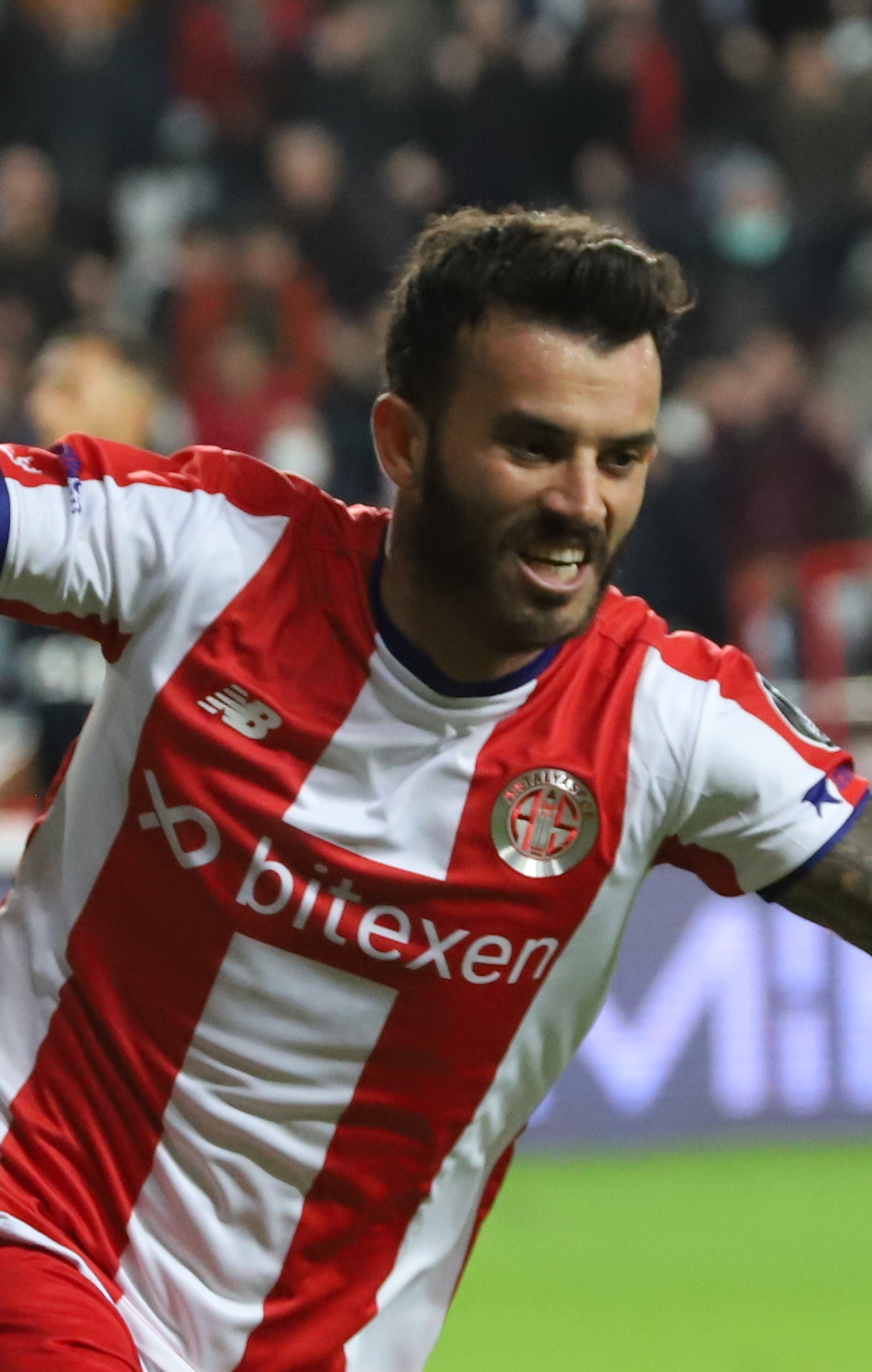
- Vural in 2021

Personal information
- Date of birth: 11 June 1988 (age 38)
- Place of birth: Afyonkarahisar, Turkey
- Height: 1.77 m (5 ft 10 in)
- Positions: Winger; left back

Team information
- Current team: Antalyaspor
- Number: 11

Youth career
- 2001–2003: Eskişehirspor
- 2003–2007: Selimiye

Senior career*
Years	Team	Apps	(Gls)
2007–2012	Denizlispor	85	(6)
2012–2016	Akhisar Belediyespor	108	(10)
2016–2017	Trabzonspor	14	(0)
2017–2018	Kayserispor	40	(5)
2018–2019	Akhisar Belediyespor	26	(2)
2019–2021	Gaziantep	62	(5)
2021–2025	Antalyaspor	128	(8)
2025–2026	Iğdır	30	(1)
2026–	Antalyaspor	7	(2)

International career^{‡}
2009–2010	Turkey U21	3	(1)
2017	Turkey	1	(0)
- * Club domestic league appearances and goals as of 18 October 2026 ‡ National team caps and goals as of 27 March 2017

Güray Vural (born 11 June 1988) is a Turkish professional footballer who plays as a winger or left back for TFF 1. Lig club Antalyaspor. He is a former member of the Turkey national football team.

== International career ==
Vural made his international debut for the Turkey national team in a friendly 3–1 win over Moldova on 27 March 2017.

== Career statistics ==
As of match played on 24 May 2024

Appearances and goals by club, season and competition
Club	Season	League			Cup		Europe		Other		Total	
Club	Season	Division	Apps	Goals	Apps	Goals	Apps	Goals	Apps	Goals	Apps	Goals
Denizlispor	2007–08	Süper Lig	15	3	2	0	—		—		17	2
Denizlispor	2008–09	Süper Lig	19	1	2	0	—		—		21	1
Denizlispor	2009–10	Süper Lig	21	0	6	0	—		—		27	0
Denizlispor	2010–11	TFF First League	0	0	0	0	—		—		0	0
Denizlispor	2011–12	TFF First League	30	2	1	0	—		—		31	2
Denizlispor	Total		85	6	11	0	—		—		96	6
Akhisarspor	2012–13	Süper Lig	25	1	2	0	—		—		27	1
Akhisarspor	2013–14	Süper Lig	34	1	6	1	—		—		40	2
Akhisarspor	2014–15	Süper Lig	31	3	5	0	—		—		36	3
Akhisarspor	2015–16	Süper Lig	18	5	3	0	—		—		21	5
Akhisarspor	Total		108	10	16	1	—		—		124	11
Trabzonspor	2015–16	Süper Lig	6	0	1	0	—		—		7	0
Trabzonspor	2016–17	Süper Lig	8	0	3	1	—		—		11	1
Trabzonspor	Total		14	0	4	1	—		—		18	1
Kayserispor	2016–17	Süper Lig	13	3	3	0	—		—		16	3
Kayserispor	2017–18	Süper Lig	27	2	5	0	—		—		32	2
Kayserispor	Total		40	5	8	0	—		—		48	5
Akhisarspor	2018–19	Süper Lig	26	2	6	0	5	0	1 (Note: Appearance in Turkish Super Cup.)	0	38	2
Gaziantep	2019–20	Süper Lig	29	5	3	1	—		—		32	6
Gaziantep	2020–21	Süper Lig	33	0	1	0	—		—		34	0
Gaziantep	Total		62	5	4	1	—		—		66	6
Antalyaspor	2021–22	Süper Lig	36	1	4	0	—		1	0	41	1
Antalyaspor	2022–23	Süper Lig	30	4	1	0	—		—		31	4
Antalyaspor	2023–24	Süper Lig	30	1	1	0	—		—		31	1
Antalyaspor	Total		96	6	6	0	—		1	0	103	6
Career totals			431	34	55	3	5	0	2	0	493	37

== Honours ==
Akhisarspor

- Turkish Super Cup: 2018
