= Halil Yeral =

Turkish footballer

Personal information
- Date of birth: 1 January 2000 (age 26)
- Place of birth: Akhisar, Turkey
- Height: 1.90 m (6 ft 3 in)
- Position: Goalkeeper

Team information
- Current team: Adana 01
- Number: 1

Youth career
- 2011–2019: Akhisarspor

Senior career*
Years	Team	Apps	(Gls)
2019–2023	Akhisarspor	40	(0)
2023–2025	Samsunspor	0	(0)
2025	Eyüpspor	0	(0)
2025–2026	Adana 01	17	(0)
2026–	Aliağa FK	2	(0)
- * Club domestic league appearances and goals as of 1 October 2026

Halil Yeral (born 1 January 2000) is a Turkish footballer who plays as a goalkeeper for TFF 2. Lig club Aliağa FK.

== Career ==
A youth product of Akhisarspor, Yeral signed his first professional contract with the club in 2016. He made his professional debut in a 0–0 Süper Lig tie with Konyaspor on 25 May 2019. On 26 January 2023, he transferred to Samsunspor.

== Honours ==
Akhisarspor

- Turkish Super Cup: 2018

Samsunspor

- TFF First League: 2022–23
