= Serginho (footballer, born 1986) =

Brazilian footballer

Personal information
- Full name: Sérgio Antônio Borges Júnior
- Date of birth: 4 August 1986 (age 40)
- Place of birth: Contagem, Brazil
- Height: 1.77 m (5 ft 10 in)
- Position: Defensive midfielder

Team information
- Current team: Confiança

Youth career
- 2004–2005: Villa Nova
- 2006: Atlético Mineiro

Senior career*
Years	Team	Apps	(Gls)
2007–2015	Atlético Mineiro	162	(6)
2008	→ CRB (loan)	3	(0)
2013–2014	→ Criciúma (loan)	63	(4)
2015	→ Vasco da Gama (loan)	51	(1)
2016–2017	Sport	40	(2)
2017	Al Wasl SC	14	(0)
2017–2019	Akhisar Belediyespor	56	(6)
2019	Coritiba	11	(1)
2020	Villa Nova	2	(0)
2020–	Confiança	22	(0)
- * Club domestic league appearances and goals as of 23:32, 2 March 2020 (UTC)

Sérgio Antônio Borges Júnior (born 4 August 1986, in Contagem), commonly known as Serginho, is a Brazilian footballer who most recently played as a defensive midfielder for Confiança

== Club career ==
Serginho was born in Contagem, Minas Gerais. A Villa Nova youth graduate, he moved to Atlético Mineiro in 2006, and made his senior debuts in the following year's Campeonato Mineiro.

Serginho made his Série A debut on 21 July 2007, in a 0–4 away defeat to Vasco da Gama. After a short loan spell at CRB, he established himself as a starter for Galo, and scored his first professional goal on 24 August 2008, netting the first in a 4–0 home routing of Atlético Paranaense.

On 27 May 2013 Serginho was loaned to fellow top division club Criciúma, until the end of the year. On 14 January of the following year he extended his loan for a further season.

On 23 January 2015 Serginho joined Vasco, in a season-long loan deal.

On 10 May 2018, Serginho helped Akhisar Belediyespor win their first professional trophy, the 2017–18 Turkish Cup.

== Career statistics ==
As of match played on 13 April 2018

Appearances and goals by club, season and competition
Club	Season	League			Cup		Other		Total	
Club	Season	Division	Apps	Goals	Apps	Goals	Apps	Goals	Apps	Goals
Atlético Mineiro	2008	Campeonato Brasileiro Série A	0	0	0	0	1 (Note: Appearance(s) in Copa Sudamericana)	0	1	0
Atlético Mineiro	2009	Campeonato Brasileiro Série A	12	2	0	0	0	0	12	2
Atlético Mineiro	2010	Campeonato Brasileiro Série A	28	0	0	0	4	0	32	0
Atlético Mineiro	2011	Campeonato Brasileiro Série A	28	0	4	0	16 (Note: Fourteen appearances in Campeonato Mineiro, Two appearances in Copa Sudamericana)	2	48	2
Atlético Mineiro	2012	Campeonato Brasileiro Série A	25	0	2	0	6 (Note: Appearances in Campeonato Mineiro)	1	33	1
Atlético Mineiro	2013	Campeonato Brasileiro Série A	1	0	0	0	5 (Note: Three appearances in Campeonato Mineiro, Two appearances in Copa Sudamericana)	0	6	0
Atlético Mineiro	Total		94	2	6	0	32	3	132	5
Criciúma (loan)	2013	Campeonato Brasileiro Série A	20	1	1	0	0	0	21	1
Criciúma (loan)	2014	Campeonato Brasileiro Série A	26	2	1	0	15 (Note: Thirteen appearances in Campeonato Catarinense, Two appearances in Copa Sudamericana)	1	42	3
Criciúma (loan)	Total		46	3	2	0	15	1	63	4
Vasco da Gama (loan)	2015	Campeonato Brasileiro Série A	26	0	7	0	18 (Note: Appearances in Campeonato Carioca)	1	51	1
Sport Recife	2016	Campeonato Brasileiro Série A	17	1	0	0	23 (Note: Thirteen appearances in Campeonato Pernambucano, Nine appearances in Copa do Nordeste, One appearance in Copa Sudamericana)	1	40	2
Al-Wasl	2016–17	UAE Pro-League	12	0	1	0	0	0	13	0
Akhisarspor	2017–18	Süper Lig	22	5	4	0	0	0	26	5
Career totals			217	11	20	0	88	6	325	17

== Honours ==
Atlético Mineiro

- Campeonato Mineiro: 2007, 2010, 2012, 2013

Akhisarspor

- Turkish Cup (1): 2017-18
- Turkish Super Cup: 2018
