= Miguel Lopes =

Portuguese footballer (born 1986)

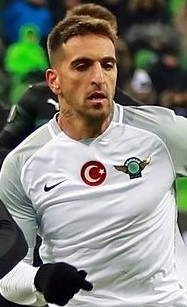
- Lopes with Akhisar Belediyespor in 2018

Personal information
- Full name: Hugo Miguel Almeida Costa Lopes
- Date of birth: 19 December 1986 (age 39)
- Place of birth: Lisbon, Portugal
- Height: 1.83 m (6 ft 0 in)
- Position: Right-back

Youth career
- 1995–1999: Oriental
- 1999–2002: Olivais Moscavide
- 2002–2004: Alverca
- 2004–2005: Benfica

Senior career*
| Years | Team | Apps | (Gls) |
| 2005–2006 | Benfica B | 24 | (4) |
| 2006–2007 | Operário | 21 | (7) |
| 2007–2009 | Rio Ave | 50 | (2) |
| 2009–2012 | Porto | 14 | (1) |
| 2010–2011 | → Betis (loan) | 21 | (0) |
| 2012 | → Braga (loan) | 10 | (0) |
| 2013–2017 | Sporting CP | 24 | (0) |
| 2013–2014 | → Lyon (loan) | 19 | (0) |
| 2015–2016 | → Granada (loan) | 26 | (0) |
| 2016–2017 | → Akhisarspor (loan) | 31 | (3) |
| 2017–2019 | Akhisarspor | 49 | (1) |
| 2019–2021 | Kayserispor | 40 | (1) |
| 2022–2025 | Estrela Amadora | 60 | (0) |
| 2025–2026 | Amora | 15 | (0) |

International career
| 2009 | Portugal U21 | 3 | (0) |
| 2012 | Portugal | 4 | (0) |
Medal record
Men's football
Representing Portugal
UEFA European Championship
| Bronze medal – third place | 2012 Poland-Ukraine |
- * Club domestic league appearances and goals as of 19:40, 29 September 2026 (UTC)

Hugo Miguel Almeida Costa Lopes (born 19 December 1986) is a Portuguese professional footballer who plays as a right-back.

During his career, he played for two of the Big Three in the Portuguese Primeira Liga – Porto and Sporting CP – as well as serving loans in Spain and France. Starting in 2016, he then spent five seasons in the Turkish Süper Lig with Akhisarspor and Kayserispor, before returning to his country with Estrela da Amadora.

Lopes represented Portugal at Euro 2012.

== Club career ==
=== Early career ===
Born in Lisbon, Lopes started his professional career with S.L. Benfica's B team. The following summer, he moved to the lower leagues with CD Operário.

After some solid displays, Lopes signed in the 2007–08 season with Segunda Liga's Rio Ave FC. In his first year, he was an habitual starter as the Vila do Conde side returned to the Primeira Liga after two years.

In 2008–09, Lopes helped Rio Ave to home draws against Benfica and FC Porto, and was again featured regularly, thus prompting interest from bigger clubs.

=== Porto ===
On 23 January 2009, Lopes agreed to a four-year deal with Porto which was made effective on 1 July. In his debut season, having to compete with Uruguayan Jorge Fucile for a starting berth, he appeared sparingly in the league but did manage to play 19 official matches, 14 as a starter.

In late August 2010, deemed surplus to requirements by new Porto manager André Villas-Boas as practically all Portuguese players, Lopes moved to Spanish side Real Betis on a one-year loan deal. He passed his medical and was unveiled on 2 September, eventually appearing in exactly half of the Segunda División games during the campaign as the Andalusians returned to La Liga as champions after three years.

Lopes spent the first part of 2011–12 unregistered by Porto. In the January transfer window he was loaned to fellow top-division side S.C. Braga, going on to start in seven of his league appearances as they finished third and qualified for the UEFA Champions League for the second time in their history.

Lopes returned to Porto for the 2012–13 season. On 29 September he scored through a rare header, opening the score in an eventual 2–2 draw at former team Rio Ave.

=== Sporting CP ===
In January 2013, Lopes joined fellow Big Three side Sporting CP on a five-and-a-half-year contract, with Marat Izmailov moving in the opposite direction. On 7 July, he agreed to a one-year loan deal at Olympique Lyonnais in Ligue 1.

On 31 May 2015, Lopes was featured in the final of the Taça de Portugal against Braga, coming on as a substitute after the first-half dismissal of Cédric Soares. Although he was beaten by Rafa Silva who put the opposition 2–0 up, his side eventually won in a penalty shootout.

Lopes returned to Spain on 6 August 2015, joining Granada CF on a one-year loan deal.

=== Turkey ===
The following season, still owned by Sporting, Lopes signed with Akhisarspor in the Süper Lig. Subsequently, the move was made permanent.

On 10 May 2018, Lopes helped the club win their first professional trophy, the Turkish Cup. In the final, he scored once in the 3–2 win over Fenerbahçe SK.

Lopes joined Kayserispor of the same league in July 2019, on a two-year contract. When he returned home for injury treatment the following March, he was unable to get back into Turkey due to COVID-19 restrictions, and his place was taken by Bosnian new signing Zoran Kvržić.

=== Later career ===
Lopes returned to Portugal in December 2021 after six years away, with the 35-year-old signing with C.F. Estrela da Amadora who had just been promoted to the second tier. On 11 June 2023, he scored in a 2–1 loss away to C.S. Marítimo, winning the promotion/relegation play-offs on penalties and returning to the top flight following a lengthy absence.

In his later years, Lopes featured more often than not as a centre-back. He left the club on 18 July 2025, by mutual agreement.

== International career ==
Due to his ability to play as both a right and a left back, Lopes was selected by Portugal coach Paulo Bento for his UEFA Euro 2012 squad. He earned his first cap on 2 June in a 1–3 friendly loss against Turkey in Lisbon, being an unused member in the finals in Poland and Ukraine.

== Personal life ==
Lopes' twin brother, Nuno, was also a footballer and a right-back. Both came through exactly the same youth system setup, with the exception of Benfica.

== Career statistics ==
As of 18 May 2024

| Club | Season | League | | | National Cup | | League Cup | | Continental | | Other | | Total | |
| Club | Season | Division | Apps | Goals | Apps | Goals | Apps | Goals | Apps | Goals | Apps | Goals | Apps | Goals |
|---|---|---|---|---|---|---|---|---|---|---|---|---|---|---|
| Benfica B | 2005–06 | Segunda Divisão | 24 | 4 | — | | — | | — | | — | | 24 | 4 |
| Operário | 2006–07 | Segunda Divisão | 21 | 7 | 2 | 0 | — | | — | | — | | 23 | 7 |
| Rio Ave | 2007–08 | Segunda Liga | 24 | 2 | 3 | 0 | 1 | 0 | — | | — | | 28 | 2 |
| Rio Ave | 2008–09 | Primeira Liga | 26 | 0 | 0 | 0 | 3 | 0 | — | | — | | 29 | 0 |
| Rio Ave | Total | | 50 | 2 | 3 | 0 | 4 | 0 | — | | — | | 57 | 2 |
| Porto | 2009–10 | Primeira Liga | 12 | 0 | 2 | 0 | 5 | 0 | 0 | 0 | 0 | 0 | 19 | 0 |
| Porto | 2010–11 | Primeira Liga | 0 | 0 | 0 | 0 | 0 | 0 | 0 | 0 | 1 (Note: Appearance in Supertaça Cândido de Oliveira) | 0 | 1 | 0 |
| Porto | 2012–13 | Primeira Liga | 2 | 1 | 1 | 0 | 0 | 0 | 2 (Note: Appearances in UEFA Champions League) | 0 | 1 | 0 | 6 | 1 |
| Porto | Total | | 14 | 1 | 3 | 0 | 5 | 0 | 2 | 0 | 2 | 0 | 26 | 1 |
| Betis (loan) | 2010–11 | Segunda División | 21 | 0 | 1 | 0 | — | | — | | — | | 22 | 0 |
| Braga (loan) | 2011–12 | Primeira Liga | 10 | 0 | 0 | 0 | 2 | 0 | 1 (Note: Appearances in UEFA Europa League) | 0 | — | | 13 | 0 |
| Sporting CP | 2012–13 | Primeira Liga | 14 | 0 | 0 | 0 | 0 | 0 | — | | — | | 14 | 0 |
| Sporting CP | 2014–15 | Primeira Liga | 10 | 0 | 5 | 0 | 2 | 0 | 0 | 0 | — | | 17 | 0 |
| Sporting CP | Total | | 24 | 0 | 5 | 0 | 2 | 0 | 0 | 0 | — | | 31 | 0 |
| Lyon (loan) | 2013–14 | Ligue 1 | 19 | 0 | 2 | 0 | 1 | 0 | 9 (Note: Appearances in UEFA Champions League and UEFA Europa League) | 0 | — | | 31 | 0 |
| Granada (loan) | 2015–16 | La Liga | 26 | 0 | 3 | 0 | — | | — | | — | | 29 | 0 |
| Akhisarspor (loan) | 2016–17 | Süper Lig | 31 | 3 | 3 | 0 | — | | — | | — | | 34 | 3 |
| Akhisarspor | 2017–18 | Süper Lig | 28 | 0 | 7 | 1 | — | | — | | — | | 35 | 1 |
| Akhisarspor | 2018–19 | Süper Lig | 21 | 1 | 5 | 0 | — | | 4 | 0 | 1 (Note: Appearance in Turkish Super Cup) | 0 | 31 | 1 |
| Akhisarspor | Total | | 80 | 4 | 15 | 1 | — | | 4 | 0 | 1 | 0 | 100 | 5 |
| Kayserispor | 2019–20 | Süper Lig | 26 | 0 | 2 | 0 | — | | — | | — | | 28 | 0 |
| Kayserispor | 2020–21 | Süper Lig | 14 | 0 | 1 | 0 | — | | — | | — | | 15 | 0 |
| Kayserispor | Total | | 40 | 0 | 3 | 0 | — | | — | | — | | 43 | 0 |
| Estrela Amadora | 2021–22 | Liga Portugal 2 | 11 | 0 | — | | — | | — | | — | | 11 | 0 |
| Estrela Amadora | 2022–23 | Liga Portugal 2 | 17 | 0 | 0 | 0 | 2 | 0 | — | | 2 (Note: Appearances in Liga Portugal 2 promotion play-offs) | 1 | 21 | 1 |
| Estrela Amadora | 2023–24 | Primeira Liga | 17 | 0 | 1 | 0 | 1 | 0 | — | | — | | 19 | 0 |
| Estrela Amadora | Total | | 45 | 0 | 1 | 0 | 3 | 0 | — | | 2 | 1 | 51 | 1 |
| Career total | | | 374 | 18 | 38 | 1 | 17 | 0 | 16 | 0 | 5 | 1 | 450 | 20 |

== Honours ==
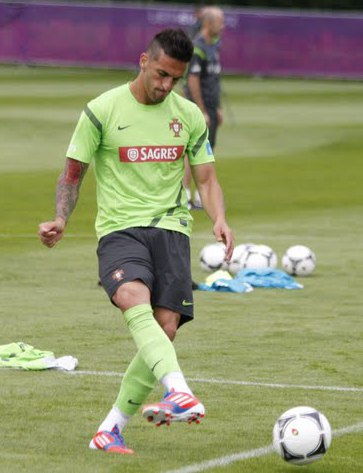
Lopes training with Portugal at Euro 2012

Porto

- Primeira Liga: 2012–13
- Taça de Portugal: 2009–10
- Supertaça Cândido de Oliveira: 2010, 2012

Betis

- Segunda División: 2010–11

Sporting CP

- Taça de Portugal: 2014–15

Akhisarspor

- Turkish Cup: 2017–18
- Turkish Super Cup: 2018
