= Aykut Çeviker =

Turkish footballer

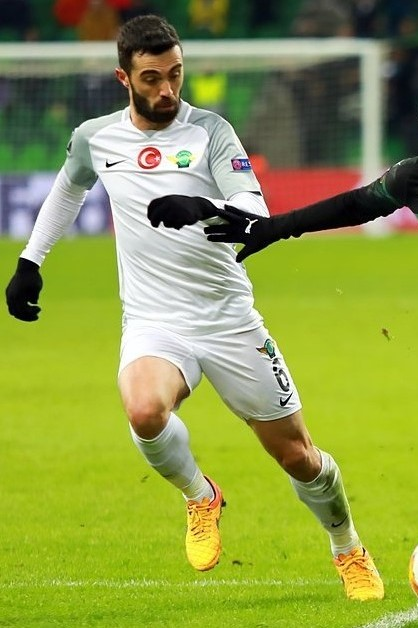
- Çeviker with Akhisar Belediyespor in 2018

Personal information
- Date of birth: 3 January 1990 (age 36)
- Place of birth: Ankara, Turkey
- Height: 1.75 m (5 ft 9 in)
- Position: Midfielder

Team information
- Current team: Etimesgut Belediyespor
- Number: 6

Youth career
- 2001–2003: Gençlerbirliği
- 2003–2004: Hacettepe
- 2004–2007: Gençlerbirliği

Senior career*
Years	Team	Apps	(Gls)
2007–2011	Gençlerbirliği	0	(0)
2008–2010	→ Kastamonuspor (loan)	61	(0)
2010–2011	→ Hacettepe (loan)	25	(0)
2011–2013	Bucaspor	49	(0)
2013–2015	Balıkesirspor	61	(1)
2015–2020	Akhisarspor	98	(2)
2020–2022	Tuzlaspor	20	(0)
2022–2023	Ankara Keçiörengücü	31	(0)
2023–	Etimesgut Belediyespor	2	(0)

International career^{‡}
2005–2006	Turkey U16	4	(0)
2007	Turkey U18	1	(0)
- * Club domestic league appearances and goals as of 16 September 2023 ‡ National team caps and goals as of 10 May 2018

Aykut Çeviker (born 3 January 1990) is a Turkish footballer who plays for Etimesgut Belediyespor. He played for the Turkey youth football teams.

== Professional career ==
On 10 May 2018, Aykut helped Akhisar Belediyespor win their first professional trophy, the 2017–18 Turkish Cup.

== Honours ==
Akhisarspor

- Turkish Cup (1): 2017-18
- Turkish Super Cup: 2018
