= Dany Nounkeu =

Cameroonian footballer (born 1986)

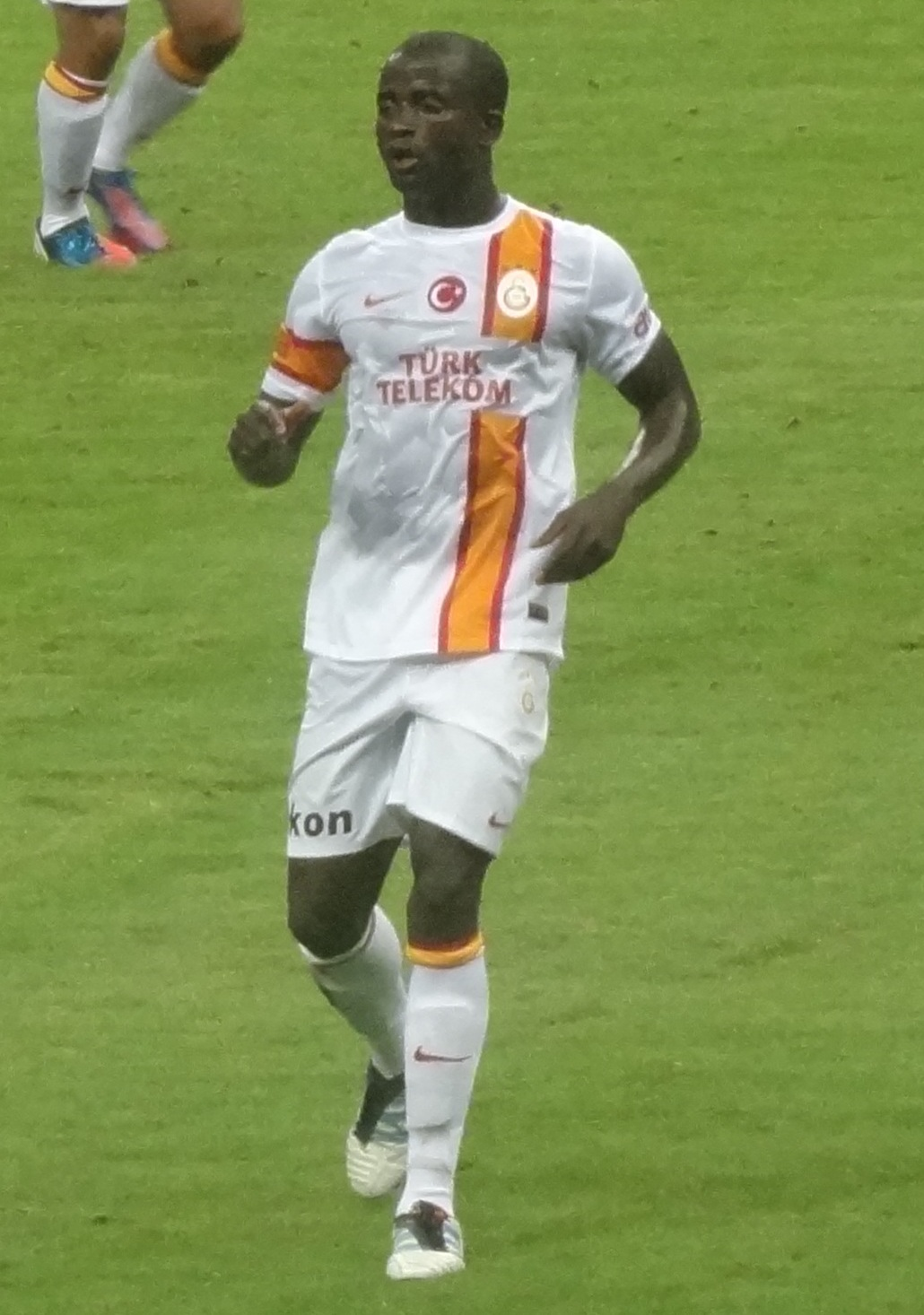

Personal information
- Full name: Dany Achille Nounkeu Tchounkeu
- Date of birth: 11 April 1986 (age 40)
- Place of birth: Yaoundé, Cameroon
- Height: 1.83 m (6 ft 0 in)
- Position: Centre back

Youth career
- 2000–2005: Collège Vogt Atletic

Senior career*
| Years | Team | Apps | (Gls) |
| 2005–2006 | Metz B | 13 | (0) |
| 2006–2008 | CSO Amnéville | 16 | (3) |
| 2008–2009 | Pau FC | 24 | (0) |
| 2009–2010 | Toulouse | 18 | (0) |
| 2010–2012 | Gaziantepspor | 46 | (0) |
| 2012–2015 | Galatasaray | 30 | (0) |
| 2014 | → Beşiktaş (loan) | 9 | (0) |
| 2014–2015 | → Granada (loan) | 0 | (0) |
| 2015 | → Evian (loan) | 14 | (1) |
| 2015–2016 | Bursaspor | 15 | (1) |
| 2016–2018 | Karabükspor | 42 | (0) |
| 2018 | Akhisar Belediyespor | 13 | (0) |
| 2020–2022 | Arta/Solar7 | 0 | (0) |

International career^{‡}
| 2003 | Cameroon U17 | 11 | (0) |
| 2010–2014 | Cameroon | 23 | (0) |
- * Club domestic league appearances and goals as of 29 October 2018 ‡ National team caps and goals as of 10 May 2018

Dany Achille Nounkeu Tchounkeu (born 11 April 1986) is a Cameroonian former professional footballer who plays as a centre back.

== Career ==
=== Early years ===
Originating from the Bamileke tribe of the West Region, Nounkeu began his career at Collège Vogt Atletic in Yaoundé, and joined FC Metz in July 2005. After only appearing with the reserves in the Championnat de France amateur he moved to CSO Amnéville in the same division.

In July 2008 Nounkeu moved to fellow league team Pau FC, appearing in 24 matches in the 2008–09 campaign.

=== Toulouse ===
On 5 June 2009, Nounkeu signed a four-year deal with Ligue 1 club Toulouse FC. He made his debut as a professional on 12 September, starting and playing the full 90 minutes in a 0–0 away draw against AS Nancy Lorraine.

Nounkeu featured in 17 matches during his first season at the club (all starts, 1530 minutes of action), with his side finishing 14th.

=== Gaziantepspor ===
On 1 September 2010, Nounkeu signed a three-year deal with Turkish Süper Lig outfit Gaziantepspor, for an undisclosed fee. He played his first match for the club on 30 October, starting in a 0–0 home draw against Karabükspor.

Nounkeu featured regularly in 2011–12, appearing in 28 matches as his side finished 10th.

=== Galatasaray ===
On 8 June 2012, Nounkeu moved to Galatasaray, by agreeing to a four-year deal for a €3.3 million fee. He made his debut on 22 September, starting in a 3–1 win at Beşiktaş.

==== Beşiktaş (loan) ====
On 2 February 2014, after featuring sparingly during the 2013–14 campaign, Nounkeu was loaned Beşiktaş until June. He appeared in nine matches for the club before returning to Galatasaray when his loan expired.

==== Granada (loan) ====
On 30 August 2014, Nounkeu joined Granada in a season-long loan deal.

=== Bursaspor ===
On 30 July 2015, Nounkeu agreed with Turkish club Bursaspor for three years.

=== Akhisarspor ===
On 10 May 2018, Nounkeu helped Akhisar Belediyespor win their first professional trophy, the 2017–18 Turkish Cup.

=== Arta/Solar7 ===
In December 2020, Nounkeu completed a permanent move to the Djiboutian side Arta/Solar7, where he will play alongside fellow Cameroonian, Alex Song.

== International career ==
Nounkeu presented his homeland international at 2003 FIFA U-17 World Championship in Finland. His first call-up for the main squad was in November 2004 under Winfried Schäfer. Nounkeu took part of the LG cup in 2011 in Morocco with the Cameroon National team scoring a penalty kick against the host Morocco. After being part of Cameroon squad during the qualification campaign for the 2014 World Cup, Nounkeu was included in the final roster to take part of the tournament in Brazil, playing two out of three games for Cameroon during including one start against Croatia .

== Honours ==
Galatasaray

- Süper Lig: 2012–13
- Turkish Super Cup: 2012, 2013

Akhisarspor

- Turkish Cup: 2017–18
- Turkish Super Cup: 2018
