= Daniel Larsson (footballer) =

Swedish footballer (born 1987)

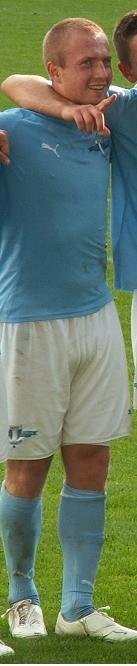
- Larsson playing for Malmö FF in 2010

Personal information
- Full name: Daniel Alexander Larsson
- Date of birth: 25 January 1987 (age 39)
- Place of birth: Gothenburg, Sweden
- Height: 1.75 m (5 ft 9 in)
- Position: Winger

Youth career
- 1992–1994: IFK Göteborg
- 1994–2002: IK Zenith
- 2002–2004: BK Häcken

Senior career*
Years	Team	Apps	(Gls)
2002–2008	BK Häcken	73	(17)
2009–2012	Malmö FF	113	(31)
2013–2014	Valladolid	46	(3)
2014–2015	Granada	1	(0)
2015	→ Esbjerg (loan)	14	(2)
2015–2016	Gaziantepspor	46	(4)
2017–2019	Akhisar Belediyespor	39	(3)
2019–2020	Aris	39	(6)
2020–2021	Apollon Limassol	4	(1)
2021	Akropolis IF	14	(2)
Total		389	(69)

International career
2002–2004	Sweden U17	23	(11)
2005–2006	Sweden U19	8	(2)
2010–2011	Sweden	5	(0)
- * Club domestic league appearances and goals

Daniel Alexander Larsson (born 25 January 1987) is a Swedish former professional footballer who played as a winger. Beginning his career with BK Häcken in 2002, he went on to play professionally in Spain, Denmark, Turkey, Greece, and Cyprus before retiring with Akropolis IF in 2021. A full international between 2010 and 2011, he won five caps for the Sweden national team.

== Club career ==
=== BK Häcken ===
Larsson started his professional career in 2002 with BK Häcken in the Superettan, the second tier of professional football in Sweden. His twelve goals during his final season with Häcken helped the club win promotion to the Allsvenskan. In 2009, he left Häcken for Malmö FF.

=== Malmö ===
He scored his first goal for Malmö FF on 19 April 2009 in the second home game of the season against Trelleborgs FF. For the 2009 season he was the club's top scorer with 11 goals, finishing third in the league overall. Larsson formed a partnership in attack with Edward Ofere, who himself scored 10 goals, many of them assisted by Larsson. During 2010 Allsvenskan, Larsson became one of the most important players in Malmö FF's title-winning squad. He once again scored 10 goals, and assisted on 10 as well, which was the highest number of assists in the league that year. Many credit Larsson with improving his game in terms of vision, teamwork, passing skill and pace, all of which were considered his key assets.

Larsson scored the only goal in the first leg of the 2011–12 UEFA Champions League third qualifying round for Malmö to win the game 1–0 against Rangers at Ibrox Stadium. He finished as Malmö FF's top scorer for the 2011 season with 6 goals and 9 assists. During the 2012 season Larsson managed only 4 goals in 30 matches, his lowest tally for Malmö. On 7 November 2012, it was announced that Larsson would go on a free transfer to Spanish club Real Valladolid when his contract with Malmö FF ended on 1 January 2013.

=== Real Valladolid ===
On 7 November 2012, Malmö FF confirmed that Larsson would transfer to Real Valladolid on 1 January 2013. On 25 October 2013, he scored his first goal for the club in a 3–0 away victory against Rayo Vallecano.

=== Granada ===
In June 2014 it was confirmed that Larsson would transfer to Granada CF on a three-year contract. He signed on for about €525,000 per season on 10 June 2014.

On 30 January 2015, after appearing in only one match with the Andalusians, Larsson was loaned to Esbjerg until June.

=== Gaziantepspor ===
On 7 August 2015, Larsson was transferred to Turkish Süper Lig club Gaziantepspor. He went on to score 4 goals in 46 appearances for the club before ending his contract by mutual agreement on 20 December 2016.

=== Akhisar Belediyespor ===
After ending his contract with Gaziantepspor early, Larsson completed a move to fellow Süper Lig side Akhisar Belediyespor. He signed a 2 1/2-year contract on 22 December 2016. On 10 May 2018, he helped Akhisar Belediyespor win their first professional trophy, the 2017–18 Turkish Cup.

=== Aris ===
On 24 January 2019, following his release from Akhisar Belediyespor, he signed a 1 1/2-year contract with Aris. His first goal came after four appearances in a 3–0 away win against Asteras Tripolis, on 11 February 2019. On 3 March 2019, Larsson scored in a 2–0 home win against title holders AEK Athens.

On 24 November 2019, he scored against AEK Athens, opening the score in a 1–1 away draw. This was his first goal after 265 days. He then scored an equalizer at home against Lamia on 1 December 2019 and on 4 January 2020, he scored in a 4–2 home win against PAOK, at the Derby of Thessaloniki.

On 13 February 2020, scored in a 1-0 Greek Cup away win against Atromitos, helping his club qualify for the semi-finals. On 22 February 2020, he scored in a 2-2 away draw against Lamia.

== International career ==
Larsson made his debut for Sweden against Oman as a part of Sweden's winter tour on 20 January 2010. On 17 May 2010, he was once again included in the national squad.

== Personal life ==
Larsson's younger brother is Fatih Karagümrük player Sam Larsson.

== Career statistics ==
As of 4 March 2020

Appearances and goals by club, season and competition
Club	Season	League			Cup		Continental		Total	
Club	Season	Division	Apps	Goals	Apps	Goals	Apps	Goals	Apps	Goals
Häcken	2004	Superettan	2	0	—		—		2	0
Häcken	2005	Allsvenskan	5	0	—		—		5	0
Häcken	2006	Allsvenskan	17	2	—		—		17	2
Häcken	2007	Superettan	21	3	3	2	5	0	29	5
Häcken	2008	Superettan	28	12	1	0	—		29	12
Häcken	Total		73	17	4	2	5	0	82	19
Malmö	2009	Allsvenskan	27	11	0	0	—		27	11
Malmö	2010	Allsvenskan	29	10	1	0	—		30	10
Malmö	2011	Allsvenskan	27	6	3	2	12	2	42	9
Malmö	2012	Allsvenskan	30	4	1	0	—		31	4
Malmö	Total		113	31	5	2	12	2	130	35
Real Valladolid	2012–13	La Liga	18	0	0	0	—		18	0
Real Valladolid	2013–14	La Liga	28	3	2	0	—		30	3
Real Valladolid	Total		46	3	2	0	0	0	48	3
Granada CF (loan)	2014–15	La Liga	1	0	3	0	—		4	0
Esbjerg fB	2014–15	Danish Superliga	14	2	3	0	—		17	2
Gaziantepspor	2015–16	Süper Lig	31	4	5	1	—		36	5
Gaziantepspor	2016–17	Süper Lig	15	0	1	0	—		16	0
Gaziantepspor	Total		46	4	6	1	0	0	52	5
Akhisar Belediyespor	2016–17	Süper Lig	9	1	1	0	—		10	1
Akhisar Belediyespor	2017–18	Süper Lig	27	2	3	0	—		30	2
Akhisar Belediyespor	2018–19	Süper Lig	3	0	3	1	—		6	1
Akhisar Belediyespor	Total		39	3	7	1	0	0	46	4
Aris	2018–19	Super League Greece	13	2	0	0	—		13	2
Aris	2019–20	Super League Greece	25	4	5	1	4	0	34	5
Aris	Total		38	6	5	1	4	0	47	7
Career total			368	66	35	7	21	2	424	75

== Honours ==
Malmö FF

- Allsvenskan: 2010

Akhisarspor

- Turkish Cup: 2017–18
- Turkish Super Cup: 2018
