= Bilal Kısa =

Turkish footballer

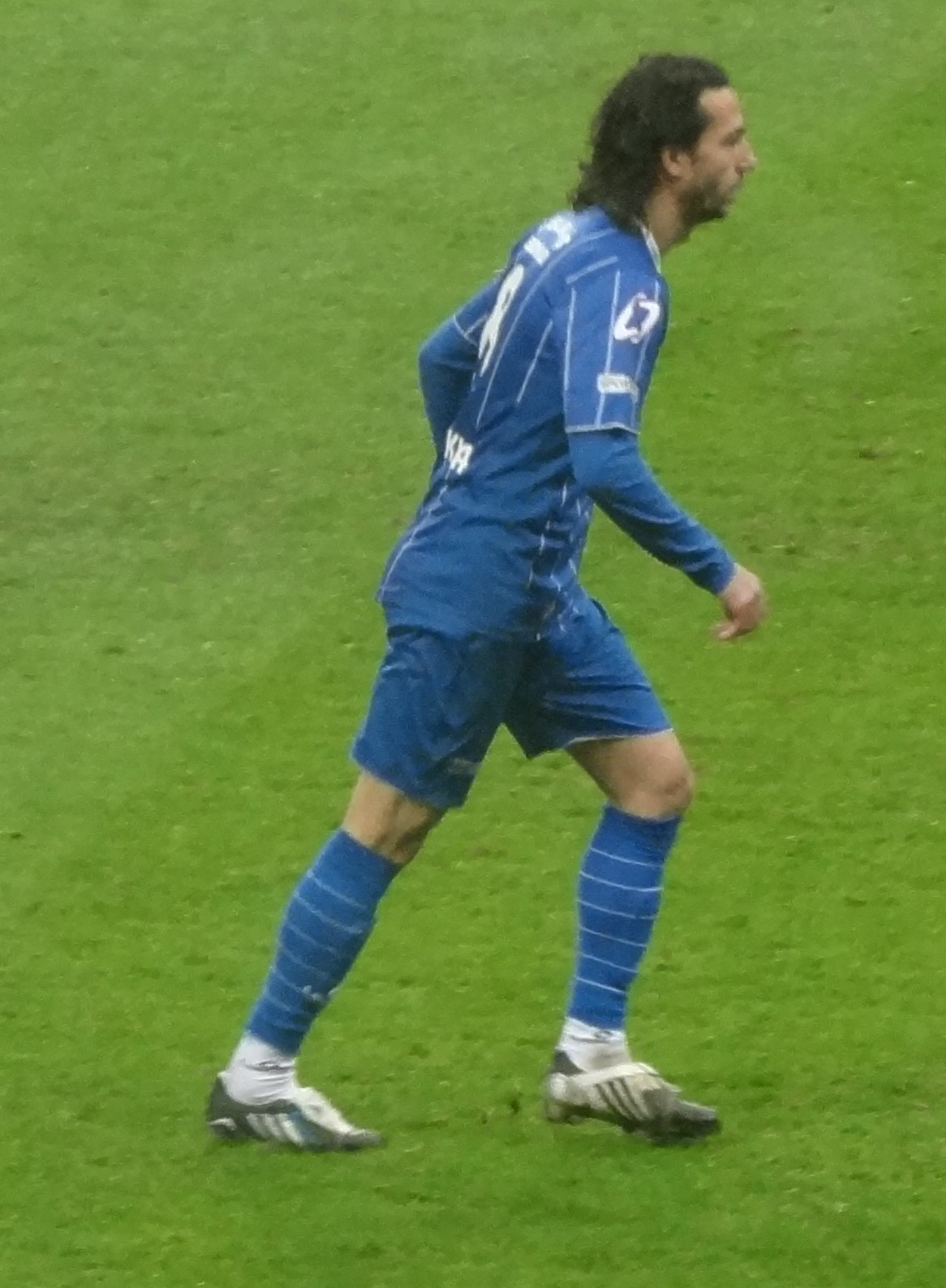

Personal information
- Date of birth: 22 June 1983 (age 43)
- Place of birth: Merzifon, Turkey
- Height: 1.80 m (5 ft 11 in)
- Position: Midfielder

Senior career*
Years	Team	Apps	(Gls)
2000–2003	Fenerbahçe	1	(0)
2003–2004	İzmirspor	31	(10)
2004–2006	Malatyaspor	58	(6)
2006–2010	Ankaraspor	89	(10)
2009–2010	→ Ankaragücü (loan)	9	(0)
2010–2011	Karşıyaka	21	(0)
2011–2013	Karabükspor	34	(5)
2013–2015	Akhisar Belediyespor	80	(9)
2015–2016	Galatasaray	22	(5)
2016–2018	Bursaspor	15	(0)
2018–2019	Akhisar Belediyespor	27	(1)
2019–2020	Boluspor	24	(2)
Total		411	(48)

International career^{‡}
2002	Turkey U20	1	(0)
2004–2005	Turkey U21	10	(2)
2006	Turkey A2	1	(0)
2006–2014	Turkey	7	(1)
- * Club domestic league appearances and goals as of 19 July 2020 ‡ National team caps and goals as of 10 May 2018

Bilal Kısa (born 22 June 1983) is a Turkish retired professional footballer who played as a midfielder.

== Club career ==
On 10 May 2018, Bilal helped Akhisar Belediyespor win their first professional trophy, the 2017–18 Turkish Cup.

== International career ==
On 29 March 2006, Kısa played his first national match when Turkey national team was playing against Estonia national team. He was reselected for the national team during the friendly clashes against Northern Ireland and Belarus in 2013.

== Style of play ==
Kısa is playing on a playmaker position generally with the assistance of two defensive midfielders. He is known with his technical moves and long range passes.

== Career statistics ==
=== Club ===
As of 19 May 2016

Club	Season	League		Cup		Other		Continental		Total	
Club	Season	Apps	Goals	Apps	Goals	Apps	Goals	Apps	Goals	Apps	Goals
Galatasaray	2015–16	21	5	7	2	1	0	5	1	34	8
Galatasaray	Total	21	5	7	2	1	0	5	1	34	8
Career total		21	5	7	2	1	0	5	1	34	8

=== International ===
Scores and results table list Turkey's goal tally first.

#	Date	Venue	Opponent	Score	Result	Competition
1	21 May 2014	Adem Jashari Olympic Stadium, Mitrovica, Kosovo	Kosovo	2–0	6–1	Friendly
2	13 October 2014	Skonto Stadium, Riga, Latvia	Latvia	1–0	1–1	UEFA Euro 2016 qualifying

== Honours ==
Galatasaray

- Türkiye Kupası: 2015–16
- Süper Kupa: 2015

Akhisarspor

- Türkiye Kupası: 2017-18
- Turkish Super Cup: 2018
