= Eray Ataseven =

Turkish footballer (born 1993)

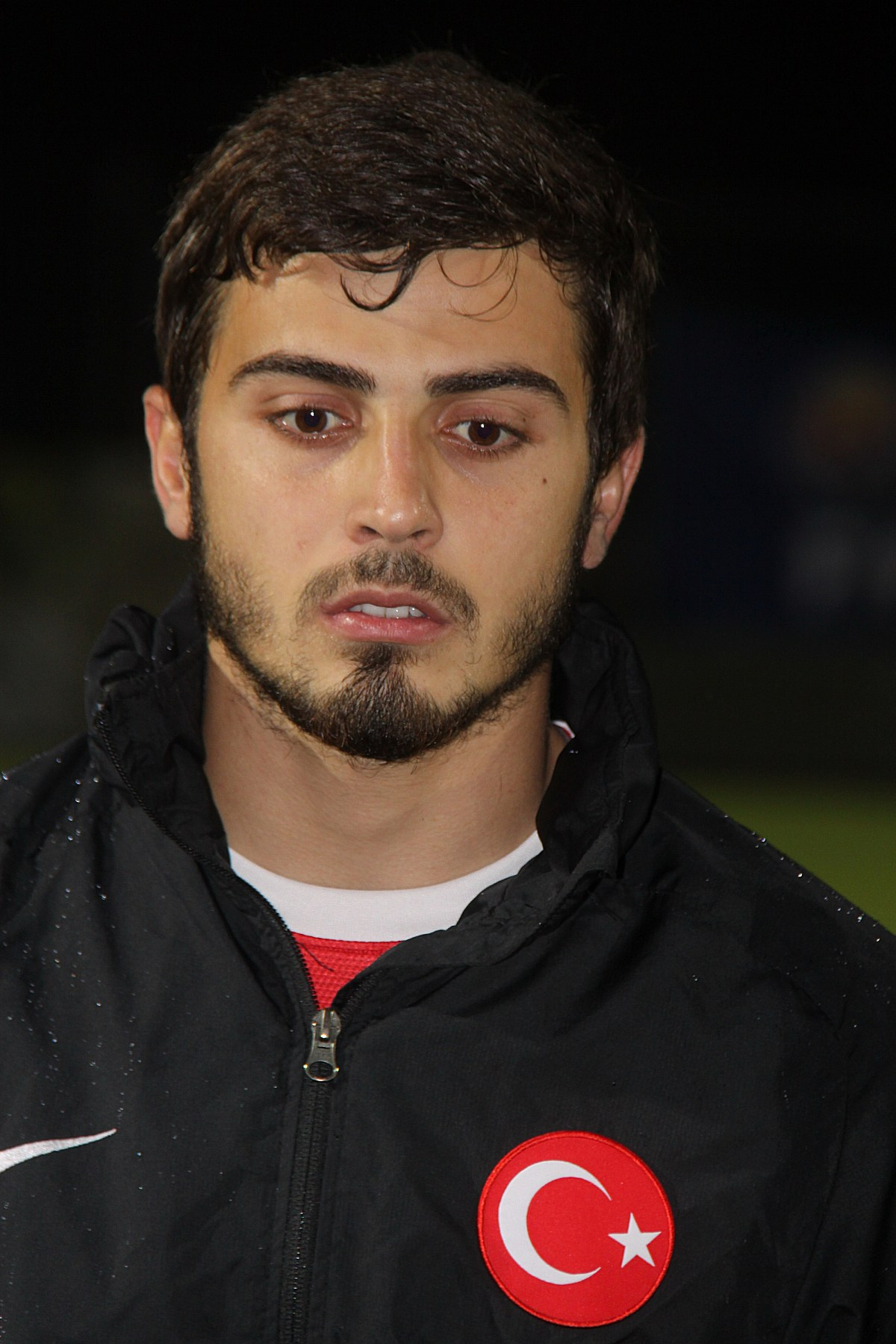
- Ataseven playing for Turkey U21 in 2013

Personal information
- Date of birth: 29 June 1993 (age 33)
- Place of birth: İzmit, Turkey
- Height: 1.81 m (5 ft 11 in)
- Position: Midfielder

Team information
- Current team: Sarier
- Number: 8

Youth career
- 2006–2008: Manisa Belediyespor
- 2008–2010: Manisaspor

Senior career*
Years	Team	Apps	(Gls)
2010–2014	Manisaspor	62	(3)
2014–2017	Balıkesirspor	87	(4)
2017–2020	Akhisar Belediyespor	34	(1)
2020–2021	Hekimoğlu Trabzon	31	(0)
2021–2023	Boluspor	43	(1)
2023–	Sarier	5	(0)

International career^{‡}
2010–2011	Turkey U18	9	(0)
2011–2012	Turkey U19	12	(1)
2013	Turkey U20	3	(0)
2013	Turkey U21	1	(0)
- * Club domestic league appearances and goals as of 23 September 2023 ‡ National team caps and goals as of 10 May 2018

Eray Ataseven (born 29 June 1993) is a Turkish footballer who plays as a midfielder for Sarier.

== Professional career ==
He made his Süper Lig debut on 31 March 2012 against Gençlerbirliği.

On 10 May 2018, Hasan Ali helped Akhisar Belediyespor win their first professional trophy, the 2017–18 Turkish Cup.

== Honours ==
Akhisarspor

- Turkish Cup (1): 2017–18
- Turkish Super Cup: 2018
