= Avdija Vršajević =

Bosnian footballer (born 1986)

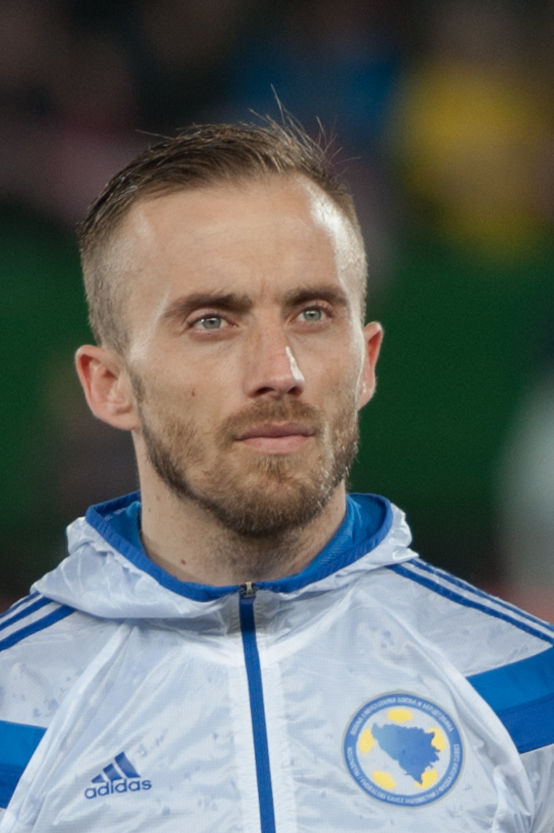
- Vršajević with Bosnia and Herzegovina in 2015

Personal information
- Full name: Avdija Vršajević
- Date of birth: 6 March 1986 (age 40)
- Place of birth: Tešanj, SFR Yugoslavia
- Height: 1.82 m (6 ft 0 in)
- Position: Right back

Team information
- Current team: Čelik Zenica

Youth career
- TOŠK Tešanj

Senior career*
| Years | Team | Apps | (Gls) |
| 2003–2004 | TOŠK Tešanj | 0 | (0) |
| 2004–2005 | Željezničar | 24 | (1) |
| 2005–2007 | Čelik Zenica | 18 | (3) |
| 2007–2009 | Sparta Prague | 0 | (0) |
| 2008 | → SK Kladno (loan) | 11 | (0) |
| 2008 | → Tatran Prešov (loan) | 10 | (1) |
| 2009–2011 | Tatran Prešov | 60 | (3) |
| 2011–2012 | Čelik Zenica | 21 | (3) |
| 2012–2015 | Hajduk Split | 74 | (4) |
| 2015–2018 | Osmanlıspor | 65 | (0) |
| 2018–2021 | Akhisarspor | 63 | (1) |
| 2021–2022 | Ümraniyespor | 43 | (1) |
| 2022–2023 | Sarajevo | 5 | (0) |
| 2024 | Čelik Zenica | 0 | (0) |
| Total | | 394 | (17) |

International career
| 2005–2006 | Bosnia and Herzegovina U21 | 13 | (1) |
| 2012–2017 | Bosnia and Herzegovina | 17 | (2) |
- * Club domestic league appearances and goals as of 7 May 2024

Avdija Vršajević (born 6 March 1986) is a Bosnian retired professional footballer who played as a right back.

== Club career ==
Vršajević's first professional club was NK TOŠK Tešanj. Here he spent the 2003–04 season before moving to Željezničar. He spent only one season at Željezničar before Čelik Zenica acquired his services. He remained at Čelik for two seasons, often in and out of the first team.

From Čelik, Avdija moved to Czech side AC Sparta Prague but never made an appearance for them, spending loan spells initially at SK Kladno and then at 1. FC Tatran Prešov. Tatran made his loan move permanent in 2009 and he spent the following two seasons there, making 60 appearances and scoring three goals. He was played as either a right back or a right winger at Tatran.

Avdija moved back to Čelik in 2011, spending one season at the club where he made a further 21 appearances.

As he only signed a one-year contract at Čelik and chose not to renew it when the season ended, Avdija moved to Croatian side Hajduk Split, signing a three-year contract. He made his debut for Hajduk on 22 July 2012 in a 0–0 draw against Istra. Immediately becoming the club's first choice right back, Avdija made 30 appearances in all competitions in his first season at Hajduk. In the 2013–14 season, manager Igor Tudor changed his role in the team often. Throughout the season he found himself at left back, right back and right wing, once again making 30 appearances in all competitions.

In June 2015, Vršajević left Hajduk Split, after agreeing mutual termination with the club.

On 18 July 2015, he signed with newly promoted Turkish side Osmanlıspor.

Three years later, Vršajević signed a two-year contract with Akhisarspor. He made his debut in the 2018 Turkish Super Cup against Galatasaray.

== International career ==
In 2006, Vršajević was called to Bosnia and Herzegovina under-21 side by then coach Ibrahim Zukanović.

He made his Bosnia and Herzegovina debut in 2012 in a 8–1 World Cup qualification win away against Liechtenstein under coach Safet Sušić. Vršajević was named in the Bosnia and Herzegovina 23-man squad for their first World Cup participation ever in the 2014 World Cup. On 25 June 2014, he scored his first goal and Bosnia's third in the 83rd minute to make it 3–1 for Bosnia and Herzegovina against Iran in the last group match, where he also made his World Cup debut. He has earned a total of 17 caps, scoring 2 goals. His final international was a March 2017 World Cup qualification match against Gibraltar.

== Career statistics ==
=== International ===
As of match played 25 March 2017

| National team | Year | Apps | Goals |
|---|---|---|---|
Bosnia and Herzegovina
| Bosnia and Herzegovina | 2012 | 4 | 0 |
| Bosnia and Herzegovina | 2013 | 7 | 0 |
| Bosnia and Herzegovina | 2014 | 4 | 1 |
| Bosnia and Herzegovina | 2015 | 1 | 0 |
| Bosnia and Herzegovina | 2016 | 0 | 0 |
| Bosnia and Herzegovina | 2017 | 1 | 1 |
| Total | | 17 | 2 |

=== International goals ===
Scores and results list Bosnia and Herzegovina's goal tally first.

| Goal | Date | Venue | Opponent | Score | Result | Competition |
|---|---|---|---|---|---|---|
| 1. | 25 June 2014 | Arena Fonte Nova, Salvador, Brazil | Iran | 3–1 | 3–1 | 2014 FIFA World Cup |
| 2. | 25 March 2017 | Bilino Polje Stadium, Zenica, Bosnia and Herzegovina | Gibraltar | 3–0 | 5–0 | 2018 FIFA World Cup qualification |

== Honours ==
Hajduk Split

- Croatian Football Cup: 2013

Akhisarspor

- Turkish Super Cup: 2018
