= 2018–19 in Turkish football =

Football in Turkey
- Season: 2018–19

Men's football
- Süper Lig: Galatasaray
- First League: Denizlispor
- Turkish Cup: Galatasaray
- Turkish Super Cup: Akhisar Belediyespor

The 2018–19 season was the 114th season of competitive football in Turkey.

== Pre-season ==
League	Promoted to league	Relegated from league
Süper Lig	Çaykur Rizespor; Ankaragücü; BB Erzurumspor	Osmanlıspor; Gençlerbirliği; Kardemir Karabükspor
1.Lig	Altay; Hatayspor; Afjet Afyonspor	Samsunspor; Manisaspor; Gaziantepspor
2.Lig	Manisa BB; Bayrampaşa; Darıca Gençlerbirliği; Ankara Demirspor; Utaş Uşakspor; Tarsus İdman Yurdu	Nazilli Belediyespor; Karşıyaka; Silivrispor; Bucaspor; Kocaeli Birlik Spor; Mersin İdman Yurdu
3.Lig	Adıyaman 1954 Spor; Artvin Hopaspor; Fatsa Belediyespor; Nevşehirspor GK; Kırşehir Belediyespor; Serik Belediyespor; Şile Yıldızspor; Alibeyköyspor; Gebzespor	12 Bingölspor; Orhangazispor; Çanakkale Dardanelspor; Kırıkhanspor; Yeşil Bursa; Kayseri Erciyesspor; Aydınspor; Tekirdağspor; Arsinspor

== League tables ==
=== Süper Lig ===
Pos	Team	Pld	W	D	L	GF	GA	GD	Pts	Qualification or relegation
1	Galatasaray (C)	34	20	9	5	72	36	+36	69	Qualification for the Champions League group stage
2	İstanbul Başakşehir	34	19	10	5	49	22	+27	67	Qualification for the Champions League third qualifying round
3	Beşiktaş	34	19	8	7	72	46	+26	65	Qualification for the Europa League group stage
4	Trabzonspor	34	18	9	7	64	46	+18	63	Qualification for the Europa League third qualifying round
5	Yeni Malatyaspor	34	13	8	13	47	46	+1	47	Qualification for the Europa League second qualifying round
6	Fenerbahçe	34	11	13	10	44	44	0	46	
7	Antalyaspor	34	13	6	15	39	55	−16	45	
8	Konyaspor	34	9	17	8	40	38	+2	44 (Note: Konyaspor finished ahead of Alanyaspor on head-to-head points: Konyaspor 2–0 Alanyaspor, Alanyaspor 2–4 Konyaspor.)	
9	Alanyaspor	34	12	8	14	37	43	−6	44	
10	Kayserispor	34	10	11	13	35	50	−15	41 (Note: Kayserispor ahead of Çaykur Rizespor and Sivasspor on head-to-head points: Kayserispor 7 pts, Çaykur Rizespor 6 pts, Sivasspor 2 pts.)	
11	Çaykur Rizespor	34	9	14	11	48	50	−2	41	
12	Sivasspor	34	10	11	13	49	54	−5	41	
13	Ankaragücü	34	11	7	16	38	53	−15	40	
14	Kasımpaşa	34	11	6	17	53	62	−9	39	
15	Göztepe	34	11	5	18	37	42	−5	38	
16	Bursaspor (R)	34	7	16	11	28	37	−9	37	Relegation to TFF First League
17	BB Erzurumspor (R)	34	8	11	15	36	43	−7	35	Relegation to TFF First League
18	Akhisarspor (R)	34	6	9	19	33	54	−21	27	Relegation to TFF First League

Source: Süper Lig, Soccerway
Rules for classification: 1) Points; 2) Head-to-head points; 3) Head-to-head goal difference; 4) Head-to-head goals scored; 5) Goal difference; 6) Goals scored; 7) Play-off.
(C) Champions; (R) Relegated

=== 1.Lig ===
Pos	Team	Pld	W	D	L	GF	GA	GD	Pts	Qualification or relegation
1	Denizlispor (C, P)	34	21	9	4	67	32	+35	72	Promotion to the Süper Lig
2	Gençlerbirliği (P)	34	22	4	8	50	28	+22	70	Promotion to the Süper Lig
3	Hatayspor	34	19	10	5	57	22	+35	67	Qualification for the Süper Lig Playoffs
4	Osmanlıspor	34	19	5	10	49	26	+23	62	Qualification for the Süper Lig Playoffs
5	Gazişehir Gaziantep (P)	34	17	8	9	60	31	+29	59	Qualification for the Süper Lig Playoffs
6	Adana Demirspor	34	17	7	10	50	36	+14	58	Qualification for the Süper Lig Playoffs
7	Altınordu	34	16	9	9	50	33	+17	57	
8	Ümraniyespor	34	14	11	9	44	37	+7	53	
9	Boluspor	34	14	7	13	41	41	0	49	
10	Altay	34	12	11	11	52	40	+12	47	
11	İstanbulspor	34	10	13	11	45	46	−1	43	
12	Adanaspor	34	9	10	15	41	49	−8	37	
13	Giresunspor	34	8	12	14	32	41	−9	36	
14	Eskişehirspor	34	9	8	17	44	66	−22	35	
15	Balıkesirspor (Note: Balıkesirspor have been deducted 6 points.)	34	11	7	16	36	45	−9	34	
16	Afjet Afyonspor (R)	34	7	9	18	38	55	−17	30	Relegation to the TFF Second League
17	Elazığspor (R)	34	6	7	21	38	64	−26	25	Relegation to the TFF Second League
18	Kardemir Karabükspor (Note: Kardemir Karabükspor have been deducted 3 points.) (R)	34	0	3	31	10	112	−102	0	Relegation to the TFF Second League

Source: TFF
Rules for classification: 1) Points; 2) Head-to-head points; 3) Head-to-head goal difference; 4) Head-to-head goals scored; 5) Goal difference; 6) Goals scored
(C) Champions; (P) Promoted; (R) Relegated

== Turkish Cup ==
=== Final ===
15 May 2019
20:45 TRT

Akhisarspor	1–3	Galatasaray
Manu 57'	Report	Gümüş 80' (pen.); Feghouli 88'; Diagne 90+4'

4 Eylül Stadium, Sivas
Referee: Suat Arslanboğa

== National team ==
=== Friendlies ===
11 October 2018 Friendly	Turkey	0–0	Bosnia and Herzegovina	Rize, Turkey
20:30 UTC+3				Stadium: Rize Şehir Stadium; Attendance: 15,200; Referee: Sergei Karasev (Russia)

20 November 2018 Friendly	Turkey	0–0	Ukraine	Antalya, Turkey
20:30 UTC+3				Stadium: Antalya Stadium; Attendance: 8,900; Referee: Genc Nuza (Kosovo)

30 May 2019 Friendly	Turkey	2–1	Greece	Antalya, Turkey
20:30 UTC+3	Ünder 11'; Karaman 17'		Kourbelis 90+3'	Stadium: Antalya Stadium; Attendance: 0 Referee: Radu Petrescu (Romania)

2 June 2019 Friendly	Turkey	2–0	Uzbekistan	Alanya, Antalya, Turkey
21:15 UTC+3	Çelik 17', 57'			Stadium: Bahçeşehir Okulları Stadium; Attendance: 7,500; Referee: Srđan Jovanović (Serbia)

=== 2018–19 UEFA Nations League ===
Pos	Team	Pld	W	D	L	GF	GA	GD	Pts	Promotion (Note: Due to revamp of the format for the 2020–21 UEFA Nations League, no teams were eventually relegated.)	(Sweden)	(Russia)	(Turkey)
1	Sweden (P)	4	2	1	1	5	3	+2	7 (Note: Head-to-head points: Sweden 4, Russia 1.)	Promotion to League A	—	2–0	2–3
2	Russia	4	2	1	1	4	3	+1	7		0–0	—	2–0
3	Turkey	4	1	0	3	4	7	−3	3		0–1	1–2	—

Source: UEFA
Rules for classification: Tiebreakers
(P) Promoted
Notes:

7 September 2018 2018–19 UEFA Nations League	Turkey	1–2	Russia	Trabzon, Turkey
21:45 UTC+3	Aziz 41'	Report	Cheryshev 13'; Dzyuba 49'	Stadium: Şenol Güneş Stadium; Attendance: 29,702; Referee: Artur Soares Dias (Portugal)

10 September 2018 2018–19 UEFA Nations League	Sweden	2–3	Turkey	Solna, Sweden
20:45 UTC+2	Kiese Thelin 35'; Claesson 49'	Report	Çalhanoğlu 51'; Akbaba 88', 90+2'	Stadium: Friends Arena; Attendance: 21,832; Referee: Jesús Gil Manzano (Spain)

14 October 2018 2018–19 UEFA Nations League	Russia	2–0	Turkey	Sochi, Russia
19:00 UTC+3	Neustädter 20'; Cheryshev 78'	Report		Stadium: Fisht Olympic Stadium; Attendance: 38,288; Referee: Paweł Raczkowski (Poland)

17 November 2018 2018–19 UEFA Nations League	Turkey	0–1	Sweden	Konya, Turkey
20:00 UTC+3		Report	Granqvist 71' (pen.)	Stadium: Konya Büyükşehir Belediye Stadium; Attendance: 37,425; Referee: István Kovács (Romania)

=== UEFA Euro 2020 qualification ===
Pos	Team	Pld	W	D	L	GF	GA	GD	Pts	Qualification	(France)	(Turkey)	(Iceland)	(Albania)	(Andorra)	(Moldova)
1	France	10	8	1	1	25	6	+19	25	Qualify for final tournament	—	1–1	4–0	4–1	3–0	2–1
2	Turkey	10	7	2	1	18	3	+15	23	Qualify for final tournament	2–0	—	0–0	1–0	1–0	4–0
3	Iceland	10	6	1	3	14	11	+3	19	Advance to play-offs via Nations League	0–1	2–1	—	1–0	2–0	3–0
4	Albania	10	4	1	5	16	14	+2	13		0–2	0–2	4–2	—	2–2	2–0
5	Andorra	10	1	1	8	3	20	−17	4		0–4	0–2	0–2	0–3	—	1–0
6	Moldova	10	1	0	9	4	26	−22	3		1–4	0–4	1–2	0–4	1–0	—

Source: UEFA
Rules for classification: Qualification tiebreakers

22 March 2019 UEFA Euro 2020 qualifying	Albania	0–2	Turkey	Shkodër, Albania
20:45 UTC+1		Report	Yılmaz 21'; Çalhanoğlu 54'	Stadium: Loro Boriçi Stadium; Attendance: 11,730; Referee: Tobias Stieler (Germany)

25 March 2019 UEFA Euro 2020 qualifying	Turkey	4–0	Moldova	Eskişehir, Turkey
20:00 UTC+3	Kaldırım 24'; Tosun 26', 53'; Ayhan 70'	Report		Stadium: Eskişehir Stadium; Attendance: 29,456; Referee: Serhiy Boyko (Ukraine)

8 June 2019 UEFA Euro 2020 qualifying	Turkey	2–0	France	Konya, Turkey
21:45 UTC+3	Ayhan 30'; Ünder 40'	Report		Stadium: Konya Büyükşehir Belediye Stadium; Attendance: 36,783; Referee: Damir Skomina (Slovenia)

11 June 2019 UEFA Euro 2020 qualifying	Iceland	2–1	Turkey	Reykjavík, Iceland
18:45 UTC+0	R. Sigurðsson 21', 31'	Report	Toköz 40'	Stadium: Laugardalsvöllur; Attendance: 9,680; Referee: Szymon Marciniak (Poland)

== Turkish clubs in Europe ==
=== UEFA Champions League ===
==== Third qualifying round ====
Team 1	Agg.	Team 2	1st leg	2nd leg
Benfica (Portugal)	2–1	(Turkey) Fenerbahçe	1–0	1–1

==== Group stage ====
===== Group D =====
Pos	Team	Pld	W	D	L	GF	GA	GD	Pts	Qualification	POR	SCH	GAL	LMO
1	(Portugal) Porto	6	5	1	0	15	6	+9	16	Advance to knockout phase	—	3–1	1–0	4–1
2	(Germany) Schalke 04	6	3	2	1	6	4	+2	11	Advance to knockout phase	1–1	—	2–0	1–0
3	(Turkey) Galatasaray	6	1	1	4	5	8	−3	4	Transfer to Europa League	2–3	0–0	—	3–0
4	(Russia) Lokomotiv Moscow	6	1	0	5	4	12	−8	3		1–3	0–1	2–0	—

Source: UEFA
Rules for classification: Group stage tiebreakers

=== UEFA Europa League ===
==== Second qualifying round ====
Team 1	Agg.	Team 2	1st leg	2nd leg
B36 Tórshavn (Faroe Islands)	0–8	(Turkey) Beşiktaş	0–2	0–6

==== Third qualifying round ====
Team 1	Agg.	Team 2	1st leg	2nd leg
İstanbul Başakşehir (Turkey)	0–1	(England) Burnley	0–0	0–1 (a.e.t.)
Beşiktaş (Turkey)	2–2 (a)	(Austria) LASK	1–0	1–2

==== Play-off round ====
Team 1	Agg.	Team 2	1st leg	2nd leg
Partizan (Serbia)	1–4	(Turkey) Beşiktaş	1–1	0–3

==== Group stage ====
===== Group D =====
Pos	Team	Pld	W	D	L	GF	GA	GD	Pts	Qualification	DZG	FEN	SPT	AND
1	(Croatia) Dinamo Zagreb	6	4	2	0	11	3	+8	14	Advance to knockout phase	—	4–1	3–1	0–0
2	(Turkey) Fenerbahçe	6	2	2	2	7	7	0	8	Advance to knockout phase	0–0	—	2–0	2–0
3	(Slovakia) Spartak Trnava	6	2	1	3	4	7	−3	7		1–2	1–0	—	1–0
4	(Belgium) Anderlecht	6	0	3	3	2	7	−5	3		0–2	2–2	0–0	—

Source: UEFA
Rules for classification: Group stage tiebreakers

===== Group I =====
Pos	Team	Pld	W	D	L	GF	GA	GD	Pts	Qualification	GNK	MAL	BES	SRP
1	(Belgium) Genk	6	3	2	1	14	8	+6	11	Advance to knockout phase	—	2–0	1–1	4–0
2	(Sweden) Malmö FF	6	2	3	1	7	6	+1	9	Advance to knockout phase	2–2	—	2–0	1–1
3	(Turkey) Beşiktaş	6	2	1	3	9	11	−2	7		2–4	0–1	—	3–1
4	(Norway) Sarpsborg 08	6	1	2	3	8	13	−5	5		3–1	1–1	2–3	—

Source: UEFA
Rules for classification: Group stage tiebreakers

===== Group J =====
Pos	Team	Pld	W	D	L	GF	GA	GD	Pts	Qualification	SEV	KRA	STL	AKH
1	(Spain) Sevilla	6	4	0	2	18	6	+12	12 (Note: Head-to-head goal difference: Sevilla +2, Krasnodar –2.)	Advance to knockout phase	—	3–0	5–1	6–0
2	(Russia) Krasnodar	6	4	0	2	8	8	0	12	Advance to knockout phase	2–1	—	2–1	2–1
3	(Belgium) Standard Liège	6	3	1	2	7	9	−2	10		1–0	2–1	—	2–1
4	(Turkey) Akhisarspor	6	0	1	5	4	14	−10	1		2–3	0–1	0–0	—

Source: UEFA
Rules for classification: Group stage tiebreakers

==== Knockout phase ====
===== Round of 32 =====
Team 1	Agg.	Team 2	1st leg	2nd leg
Fenerbahçe (Turkey)	2–3	(Russia) Zenit Saint Petersburg	1–0	1–3
Galatasaray (Turkey)	1–2	(Portugal) Benfica	1–2	0–0
