= 2019 UEFA Europa League final =

- Promotional poster
- Event: 2018–19 UEFA Europa League
Chelsea	Arsenal
(England)	(England)
4	1
- Date: 29 May 2019
- Venue: Olympic Stadium, Baku
- Man of the Match: Eden Hazard (Chelsea)
- Referee: Gianluca Rocchi (Italy)
- Attendance: 51,370
- Weather: Clear night 21 °C (70 °F); 74% humidity

The 2019 UEFA Europa League final was the final match of the 2018–19 UEFA Europa League, the 48th season of Europe's secondary club football tournament organised by UEFA, and the 10th season since it was renamed from the UEFA Cup to the UEFA Europa League. It was played at the Olympic Stadium in Baku, Azerbaijan, on 29 May 2019. The match was contested between English sides Chelsea and Arsenal, who had beaten Eintracht Frankfurt and Valencia, respectively, in the semi-finals to set up a London derby in the final. It was the tenth tournament final to feature two teams from the same association, the second all-English final, and the first between teams from the same city.

Chelsea won the final 4–1 for their second UEFA Europa League title. As winners, they earned the right to play against Liverpool, the winners of the 2018–19 UEFA Champions League, in the 2019 UEFA Super Cup. As Chelsea had already qualified for the Champions League group stage through their league performance, the group stage berth reserved for the Europa League winners was given to the third-placed team of the 2018–19 Ligue 1, Lyon, as the French Football Federation, which oversees Ligue 1, was the 5th-ranked association according to next season's access list.

Starting from this season, the Europa League final was played in the same week as the Champions League final. In March 2018, UEFA announced that a fourth substitution would be allowed in extra time and that the number of substitutes had been increased from 7 to 12. The kick-off time was also changed from 20:45 CEST to 21:00 CEST. It was the first Europa League match ever to use the video assistant referee (VAR) system.

== Venue ==
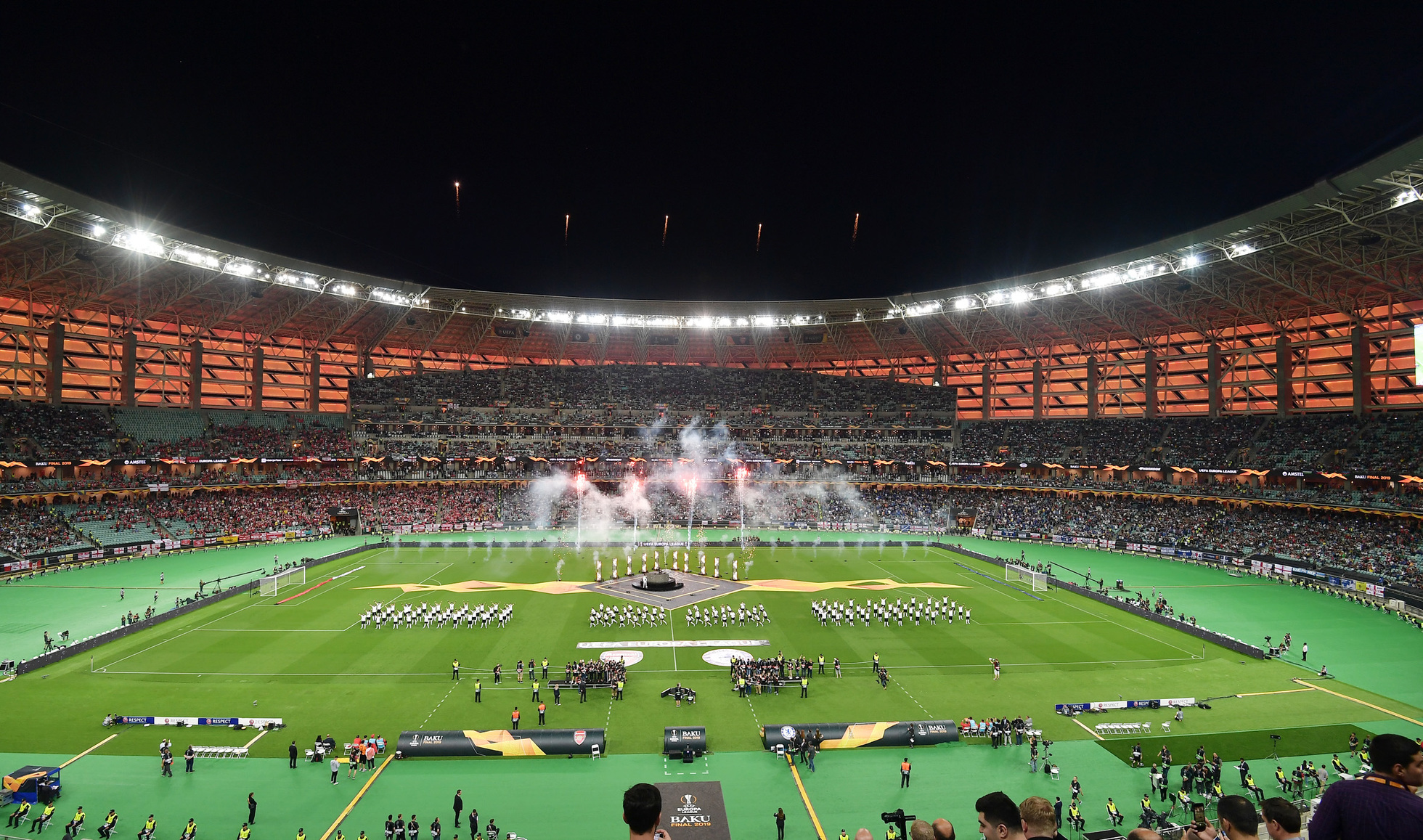
The Olympic Stadium in Baku hosted the final.

This was the first European club competition final to be held in Azerbaijan. Later, the stadium was also chosen as one of the host venues of UEFA Euro 2020.

=== Host selection ===
For the first time ever, an open bidding process was launched on 9 December 2016 by UEFA to select the venues of the club competition finals (UEFA Champions League, UEFA Europa League, UEFA Women's Champions League and UEFA Super Cup). Associations had until 27 January 2017 to express interest, and bid dossiers must be submitted by 6 June 2017.

UEFA announced on 3 February 2017 that six associations expressed interest in hosting, and confirmed on 7 June 2017 that three associations submitted bids for the 2019 UEFA Europa League Final:

Bidding associations for 2019 UEFA Europa League Final
Association	Stadium	City	Capacity	Notes
Azerbaijan	Baku Olympic Stadium	Baku	69,870	Also bid for 2019 UEFA Champions League Final
Spain	Estadio Ramón Sánchez Pizjuán	Seville	42,500	
Turkey	Vodafone Park	Istanbul	41,903	Also bid for 2019 UEFA Super Cup

The following associations expressed interest in hosting but eventually did not submit bids:

- Georgia: Boris Paichadze Dinamo Arena, Tbilisi
- Germany: Mercedes-Benz Arena, Stuttgart (preferred over Commerzbank-Arena, Frankfurt)
- Scotland: Hampden Park, Glasgow

The bid evaluation report was published by UEFA on 14 September 2017. The Baku Olympic Stadium was selected as the venue by the UEFA Executive Committee on 20 September 2017, while the Vodafone Park was successful in its bid to host the 2019 UEFA Super Cup.

== Background ==
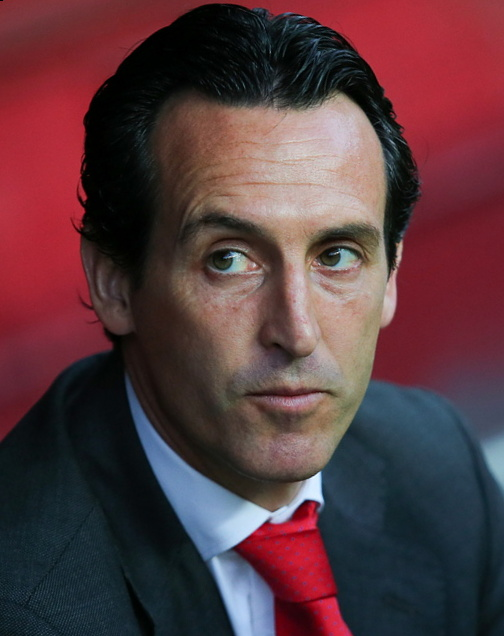
Arsenal manager Unai Emery appeared in his fourth Europa League final, having won all three prior.

Chelsea were playing in their second UEFA Cup/Europa League final, having won 2–1 against Benfica in 2013. The match was their sixth overall European final, adding to two Cup Winners' Cup finals in 1971 (a 2–1 win over Real Madrid) and 1998 (a 1–0 win over VfB Stuttgart), and two UEFA Champions League finals in 2008 (1–1, lost 6–5 on penalties to Manchester United) and 2012 (1–1, won 4–3 on penalties over Bayern Munich). In seventeen matches, Chelsea entered the match with a record of six wins, seven draws (two of which they lost on penalties), and four losses in European competitions against fellow English clubs. Most recently, they lost both legs against Manchester United in the quarter-finals of the 2010–11 Champions League. The final was the first ever final for Chelsea manager Maurizio Sarri who was looking to win his first major trophy in his managerial career and to become the seventh italian manager to win the competition after Giovanni Trapattoni, Ottavio Bianchi, Dino Zoff, Gianpiero Marini, Nevio Scala and Luigi Simoni.

It was also Arsenal's second UEFA Cup/Europa League final, having lost on penalties to Galatasaray in 2000. Like Chelsea, it was the sixth time they appeared in the final of a UEFA competition. They most recently featured in the 2006 UEFA Champions League final, losing 2–1 to Barcelona. They also reached the final of the Cup Winners' Cup three times: in 1980, when they suffered a 5–4 penalty shoot-out defeat to Valencia following a 0–0 draw and two consecutive finals in 1994, when they beat Parma 1–0, and 1995, losing 2–1 to Real Zaragoza. Arsenal had previously won 4–3 on aggregate against Anderlecht in the 1970 final of the Inter-Cities Fairs Cup, a forerunner to the UEFA Cup/Europa League. Arsenal were winless in their six prior meetings against fellow English clubs, with a record of two draws and four losses. Most recently, they lost both legs against Manchester United in the semi-finals of the 2008–09 Champions League. The match was the fourth Europa League final for manager Unai Emery, who joined Arsenal at the start of the season as the replacement for Arsène Wenger. Emery has a perfect record in Europa League finals, winning three consecutive titles with Sevilla in 2014, 2015 and 2016. He now solely holds the record for the most UEFA Cup/Europa League final appearances, having previously been tied with the three finals of Giovanni Trapattoni (1977, 1991, and 1993) and Sven-Göran Eriksson (1982, 1983, and 1998). A win would have seen him surpass Trapattoni and become the outright most successful manager in the competition's history, with four titles.

The final was the 198th competitive meeting between London rivals Chelsea and Arsenal, with a record of 76 Arsenal wins, 63 Chelsea wins and 58 draws going into the match. During the clubs' meeting in the 2018–19 Premier League season, the home team won: Chelsea by 3–2 in the first match at Stamford Bridge, and Arsenal 2–0 in the second at Emirates Stadium. They faced each other once before in a European tie, meeting in the quarter-finals of the 2003–04 Champions League; the first match finished as a 1–1 draw, with Chelsea winning the second meeting 2–1 away and advancing to the semi-finals. Domestically, the sides have met in three cup finals, with Arsenal winning the 2002 and 2017 FA Cup finals, and Chelsea winning the 2007 Football League Cup final.

The match was the second all-English UEFA Cup/Europa League final, after the inaugural final in 1972 between Wolverhampton Wanderers and Tottenham Hotspur. Overall, it was the tenth UEFA Cup/Europa League final to feature two teams from the same country, previously achieved four times by Italian teams (1990, 1991, 1995 and 1998), twice by Spanish teams (2007 and 2012), and once by German (1980) and Portuguese teams (2011), in addition to England in 1972. This was the first Europa League final to feature two teams from the same city (London), as well as the fourth in a UEFA club competition final after Atlético Madrid and Real Madrid, who met in the Champions League finals of 2014 and 2016, as well as in the 2018 UEFA Super Cup. As Tottenham Hotspur and Liverpool also reached the 2019 UEFA Champions League final, this was the first season to have multiple finals of major European club competitions featuring teams from a single nation.

=== Previous finals ===
In the following table, finals until 2009 were in the UEFA Cup era, since 2010 were in the UEFA Europa League era.

Team	Previous final appearances (bold indicates winners)
(England) Chelsea	1 (**2013**)
(England) Arsenal	1 (2000)

== Route to the final ==
Note: In all results below, the score of the finalist is given first (H: home; A: away).

(England) Chelsea				Round	(England) Arsenal			
Opponent	Result			Group stage	Opponent	Result		
(Greece) PAOK	1–0 (A)			Matchday 1	(Ukraine) Vorskla Poltava	4–2 (H)		
(Hungary) MOL Vidi	1–0 (H)			Matchday 2	(Azerbaijan) Qarabağ	3–0 (A)		
(Belarus) BATE Borisov	3–1 (H)			Matchday 3	(Portugal) Sporting CP	1–0 (A)		
(Belarus) BATE Borisov	1–0 (A)			Matchday 4	(Portugal) Sporting CP	0–0 (H)		
(Greece) PAOK	4–0 (H)			Matchday 5	(Ukraine) Vorskla Poltava	3–0 (A)		
(Hungary) MOL Vidi	2–2 (A)			Matchday 6	(Azerbaijan) Qarabağ	1–0 (H)		
Group L winners: Pos / Team / Pld / Pts; 1 / (England) Chelsea / 6 / 16; 2 / (Belarus) BATE Borisov / 6 / 9; 3 / (Hungary) Vidi / 6 / 7; 4 / (Greece) PAOK / 6 / 3; Source: UEFA				Final standings	Group E winners: Pos / Team / Pld / Pts; 1 / (England) Arsenal / 6 / 16; 2 / (Portugal) Sporting CP / 6 / 13; 3 / (Ukraine) Vorskla Poltava / 6 / 3; 4 / (Azerbaijan) Qarabağ / 6 / 3; Source: UEFA			
Opponent	Agg.	1st leg	2nd leg	Knockout phase	Opponent	Agg.	1st leg	2nd leg
(Sweden) Malmö FF	5–1	2–1 (A)	3–0 (H)	Round of 32	(Belarus) BATE Borisov	3–1	0–1 (A)	3–0 (H)
(Ukraine) Dynamo Kyiv	8–0	3–0 (H)	5–0 (A)	Round of 16	(France) Rennes	4–3	1–3 (A)	3–0 (H)
(Czech Republic) Slavia Prague	5–3	1–0 (A)	4–3 (H)	Quarter-finals	(Italy) Napoli	3–0	2–0 (H)	1–0 (A)
(Germany) Eintracht Frankfurt	2–2 (4–3 p)	1–1 (A)	1–1 (a.e.t.) (H)	Semi-finals	(Spain) Valencia	7–3	3–1 (H)	4–2 (A)

== Pre-match ==
=== Identity ===
Brand identity of the final

The brand identity for the final was unveiled at the group stage draw on 31 August 2018, taking inspiration from several prominent buildings in Baku. The logo also incorporates Azerbaijan's nickname, the "Land of Fire", by adding a flame to the letter "A", and a common design in Azerbaijani rugs.

=== Ambassador ===
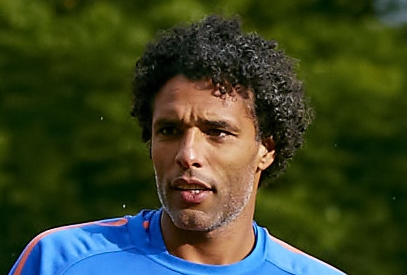
Pierre van Hooijdonk, ambassador for the final.

The ambassador for the final is former Netherlands international Pierre van Hooijdonk, who won the 2001–02 UEFA Cup with Feyenoord and finished as the top scorer, in which he scored two goals in the final win against Borussia Dortmund.

=== Ticketing and travel ===
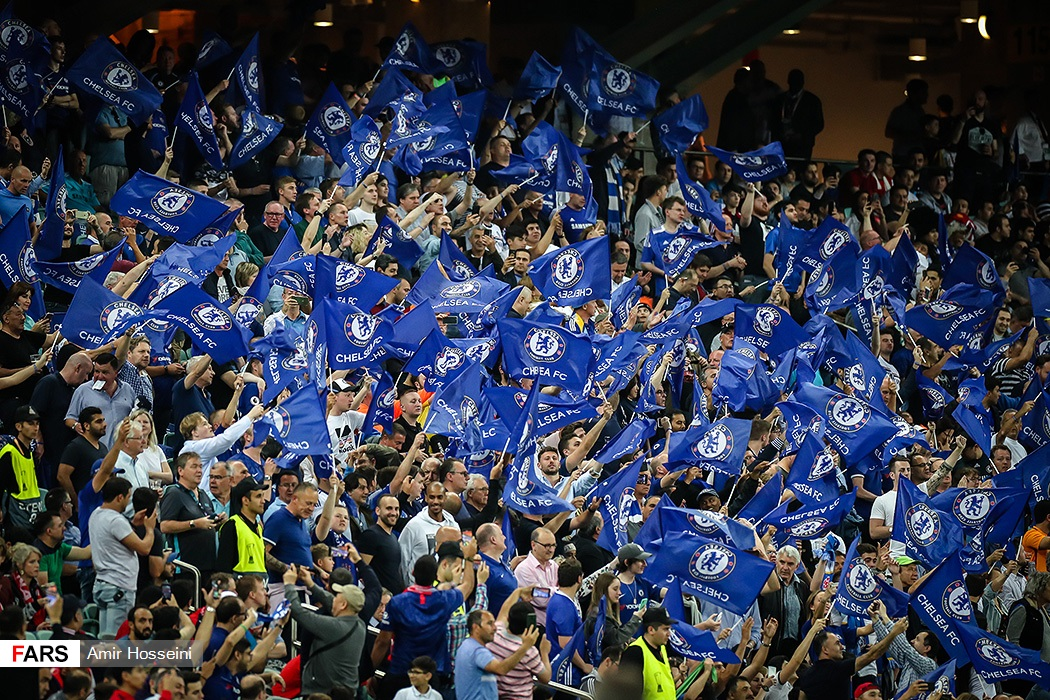
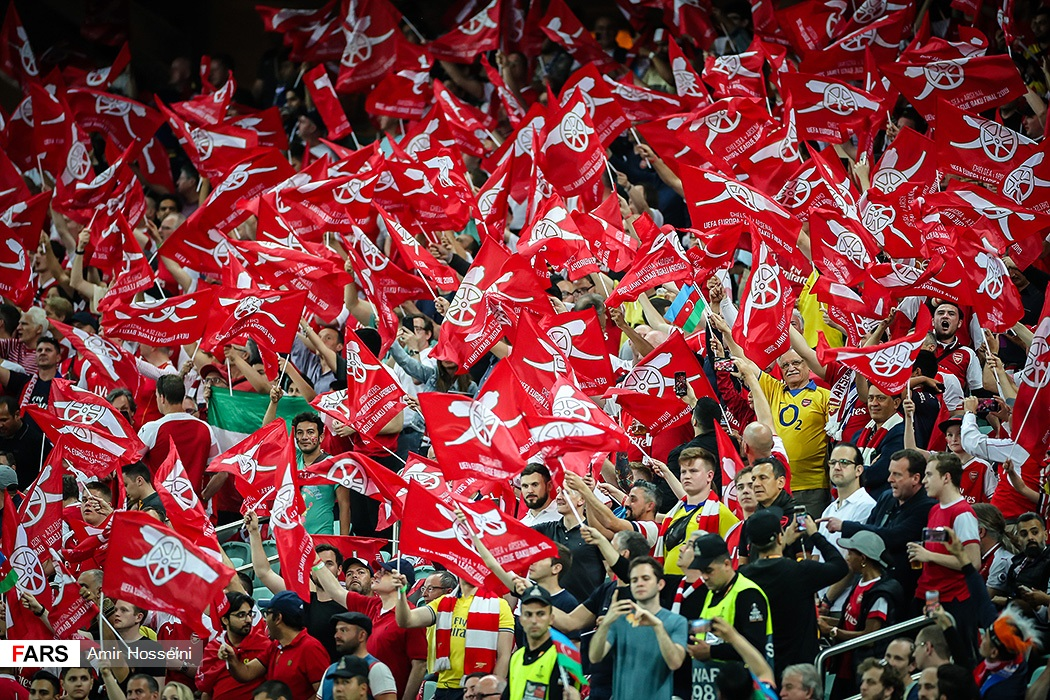
Chelsea fans (top) and Arsenal fans (bottom) during the match.

With a stadium capacity of 64,000 for the final, a total amount of 37,500 tickets are available to fans and the general public, with the two finalist teams receiving 6,000 tickets each, and with the other tickets being available for sale to fans worldwide via UEFA.com from 7 to 21 March 2019 in four price categories: €140, €90, €50, and €30. The remaining tickets are allocated to the local organising committee, national associations, commercial partners, and broadcasters, and to serve the corporate hospitality programme.

The match had an official attendance of 51,370, making it the third-largest crowd for a Europa League final, but the stadium had large sections of empty seats. Football commentators also decried the lack of atmosphere due to the empty seats and lack of interest from local residents. A report in The Times claimed that local authorities had opened the turnstiles for ticketless fans during the first half to increase attendance and avoid embarrassment, without the authorisation of UEFA.

==== Controversy ====
The handling of ticket pricing and travel logistics for English fans, including limited flights and visa requirements to enter Azerbaijan, was criticised by supporters groups representing fans of the two clubs. Heydar Aliyev International Airport, the main airport serving Baku, was described as "too small" to accommodate the expected demand of the Europa League final, and was cited as a reason for the small ticket allocation for travelling fans. Arsenal and Chelsea had failed to sell out their individual allocations by the deadline in late May and planned to return 6,000 unsold tickets to UEFA; several sponsors with their own allocations also followed suit, citing disinterest from their clients. In an official statement, Arsenal described UEFA's decision to host the match in Baku as "unacceptable, and cannot be repeated."

UEFA was also criticised for accepting Azerbaijan as the host of the Europa League final, due to its ongoing conflict with neighbouring Armenia. Arsenal's Armenian midfielder Henrikh Mkhitaryan was given permission to play in the match, but the club raised their concerns about his safety while in the country. Mkhitaryan and Arsenal ultimately decided that he would not travel with the squad to the final match, while the club planned to meet with UEFA after the match to discuss the situation. Several fans from the United Kingdom of Armenian descent were initially denied their entry visas in line with Azerbaijani visa policy, but were allowed into the country after intervention from UEFA. Amnesty International's UK branch criticised the choice of Azerbaijan on the basis of its human rights violations, calling the hosting of the final an "attempt to sportswash its image".

The match had an official attendance of 51,370, making it the third-largest crowd for a Europa League final, but the stadium had large sections of empty seats. Football commentators also decried the lack of atmosphere due to the empty seats and lack of interest from local residents. A report in The Times claimed that local authorities had opened the turnstiles for ticketless fans during the first half to increase attendance and avoid embarrassment, without the authorisation of UEFA.

=== Related events ===
The first UEFA Europa League Trophy Tour visited eight European cities, beginning on 5 March 2019 at the Geneva Motor Show, followed by Seville, Berlin, London, Milan, Moscow and Paris, before concluding in the host city, Baku, on 16 May 2019.

=== Officials ===
On 13 May 2019, UEFA named Italian Gianluca Rocchi as the referee for the final. Rocchi has been a FIFA referee since 2008, and was previously the fourth official in the 2010 and 2017 Europa League finals. He also officiated the 2017 UEFA Super Cup between Real Madrid and Manchester United. He was joined by five of his fellow countrymen, with Filippo Meli and Lorenzo Manganelli as assistant referees, Daniele Orsato as the fourth official, Massimiliano Irrati as the video assistant referee, and Marco Guida as one of the assistant VAR officials. The other assistant VAR for the final was Szymon Marciniak from Poland, with his compatriot Paweł Sokolnicki serving as the offside VAR official.

=== Team selection ===
Chelsea's options in midfield were limited for the match; with Ruben Loftus-Cheek and Callum Hudson-Odoi both out and N'Golo Kanté facing a late fitness test after suffering a knee injury in training four days before the game, there was the possibility that Jorginho, Mateo Kovačić and Ross Barkley would be the three to take the midfield positions in their usual 4–3–3 formation. Defender Antonio Rüdiger was also a long-term absentee with damage to the meniscus in his left knee. Despite Kanté missing training the Sunday before the game, he returned to the starting line-up alongside Jorginho and Kovačić after being rested for Chelsea's final league game of the season against Leicester City 17 days earlier. As well as Kanté and Kovačić in midfield, also restored to the team were goalkeeper Kepa Arrizabalaga, defenders Emerson Palmieri and Andreas Christensen, and forwards Eden Hazard and Olivier Giroud. Hazard was potentially playing in his final game for Chelsea, having attracted the interest of Real Madrid over a possible transfer, while Giroud was a former Arsenal player, having signed for Chelsea for £18 million in January 2018.

For Arsenal, midfielder Henrikh Mkhitaryan ruled himself out of selection for the match; the Armenian reportedly feared for his safety due to political tensions between his country and the host nation for the final, Azerbaijan. Also missing was midfielder Aaron Ramsey, who had suffered a hamstring injury in the second leg of Arsenal's quarter-final against Napoli, and right-back Héctor Bellerín, who had ruptured his anterior cruciate ligament in a 2–0 win over Chelsea in January 2019. In goal for Arsenal was former Chelsea goalkeeper Petr Čech, playing in his final game before retirement, four years after making the move across London for a fee of £10 million. The only players to be retained from the starting line-up against Burnley on the final day of the league season were Nacho Monreal and Pierre-Emerick Aubameyang, as Arsenal lined up in a 3–4–1–2 formation.

=== Opening ceremony ===
English artist Jonas Blue performed at the opening ceremony preceding the final, and was supported by 150 local dancers.

== Match ==
=== Summary ===
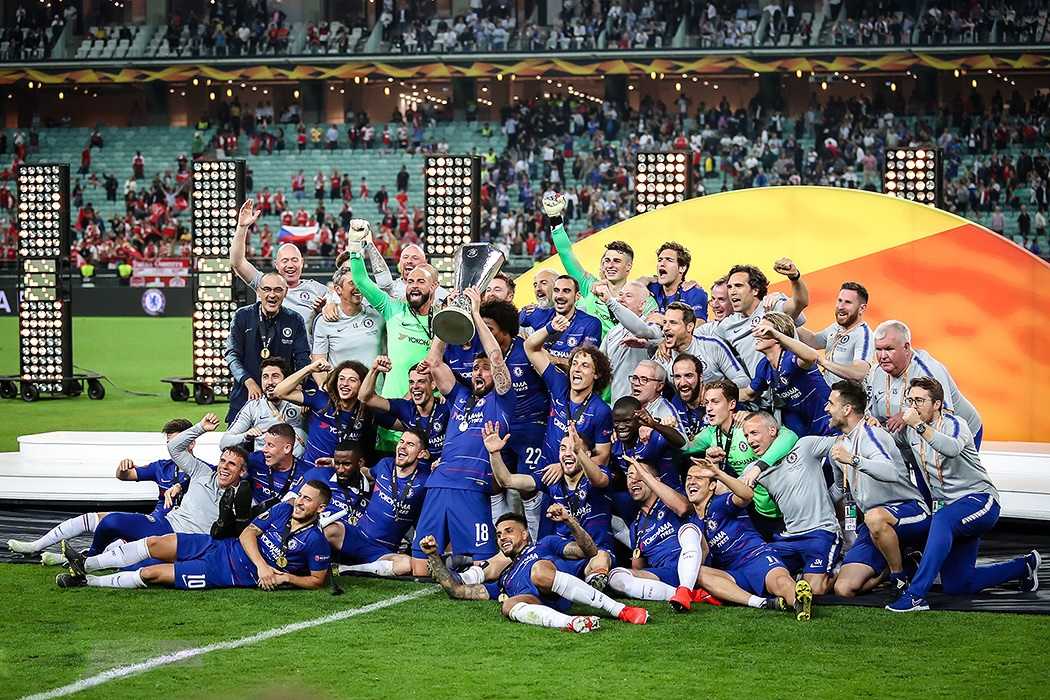
Chelsea celebrating their victory following the match.

In a scoreless first half, Granit Xhaka had a shot for Arsenal that clipped the top of the bar, while Chelsea's Olivier Giroud forced Petr Čech into a save low to his left. Giroud opened the scoring for Chelsea in the 49th minute with a low header to the left corner from 12 yards out after a cross from Emerson Palmieri on the left. Pedro made it 2–0 in the 60th minute when he steered a low shot into the right corner from 12 yards out after a low pass from Hazard on the left. Five minutes later, Chelsea were awarded a penalty after a foul on Giroud by Ainsley Maitland-Niles, which Hazard rolled into the left corner, sending Čech the wrong way. Arsenal pulled a goal back in the 69th minute with a powerful right-footed shot from substitute Alex Iwobi from outside the penalty area, but Chelsea made it 4–1 three minutes later with another goal from Hazard, a side-footed shot into the right corner from eight yards out after a pass from Giroud.

=== Details ===
The "home" team (for administrative purposes) was determined by an additional draw held after the quarter-final and semi-final draws, which was held on 15 March 2019 at the UEFA headquarters in Nyon, Switzerland.

29 May 2019
23:00 UTC+4

Chelsea (England)	4–1	(England) Arsenal
Giroud 49'; Pedro 60'; Hazard 65' (pen.), 72'	Report	Iwobi 69'

Olympic Stadium, Baku
Attendance: 51,370
Referee: Gianluca Rocchi (Italy)

Chelsea	Arsenal

GK	1	(Spain) Kepa Arrizabalaga
RB	28	(Spain) César Azpilicueta (c)
CB	27	(Denmark) Andreas Christensen	(yellow card) 68'
CB	30	(Brazil) David Luiz
LB	33	(Italy) Emerson Palmieri
CM	7	(France) N'Golo Kanté
CM	5	(Italy) Jorginho
CM	17	(Croatia) Mateo Kovačić		(substituted off) 76'
RF	11	(Spain) Pedro	(yellow card) 56'	(substituted off) 71'
CF	18	(France) Olivier Giroud
LF	10	(Belgium) Eden Hazard		(substituted off) 89'
Substitutes:
GK	13	(Argentina) Willy Caballero
GK	52	(England) Jamie Cumming
DF	3	(Spain) Marcos Alonso
DF	21	(Italy) Davide Zappacosta		(substituted on) 89'
DF	24	(England) Gary Cahill
DF	44	(Wales) Ethan Ampadu
MF	8	(England) Ross Barkley		(substituted on) 76'
MF	51	(England) Conor Gallagher
MF	55	(England) George McEachran
FW	9	(Argentina) Gonzalo Higuaín
FW	22	(Brazil) Willian		(substituted on) 71'
Manager:
(Italy) Maurizio Sarri

GK	1	(Czech Republic) Petr Čech
CB	5	(Greece) Sokratis Papastathopoulos
CB	6	(France) Laurent Koscielny (c)
CB	18	(Spain) Nacho Monreal	(substituted off) 66'
RM	15	(England) Ainsley Maitland-Niles
CM	11	(Uruguay) Lucas Torreira	(substituted off) 66'
CM	34	(Switzerland) Granit Xhaka
LM	31	(Bosnia and Herzegovina) Sead Kolašinac
AM	10	(Germany) Mesut Özil	(substituted off) 77'
CF	9	(France) Alexandre Lacazette
CF	14	(Gabon) Pierre-Emerick Aubameyang
Substitutes:
GK	19	(Germany) Bernd Leno
GK	44	(North Macedonia) Dejan Iliev
DF	12	(Switzerland) Stephan Lichtsteiner
DF	20	(Germany) Shkodran Mustafi
DF	25	(England) Carl Jenkinson
MF	4	(Egypt) Mohamed Elneny
MF	29	(France) Matteo Guendouzi	(substituted on) 66'
MF	59	(England) Joe Willock	(substituted on) 77'
FW	17	(Nigeria) Alex Iwobi	(substituted on) 66'
FW	23	(England) Danny Welbeck
FW	49	(England) Eddie Nketiah
FW	87	(England) Bukayo Saka
Manager:
(Spain) Unai Emery

Man of the Match:
Eden Hazard (Chelsea)

Assistant referees:
Filippo Meli (Italy)
Lorenzo Manganelli (Italy)
Fourth official:
Daniele Orsato (Italy)
Video assistant referee:
Massimiliano Irrati (Italy)
Assistant video assistant referees:
Marco Guida (Italy)
Szymon Marciniak (Poland)
Offside video assistant referee:
Paweł Sokolnicki (Poland)

Match rules

- 90 minutes
- 30 minutes of extra time if necessary
- Penalty shoot-out if scores still level
- Twelve named substitutes
- Maximum of three substitutions, with a fourth allowed in extra time

=== Statistics ===
First half
Statistic	Chelsea	Arsenal
Goals scored	0	0
Total shots	5	4
Shots on target	2	0
Saves	0	2
Ball possession	55%	45%
Corner kicks	3	3
Fouls committed	8	6
Offsides	1	1
Yellow cards	0	0
Red cards	0	0

Second half
Statistic	Chelsea	Arsenal
Goals scored	4	1
Total shots	9	11
Shots on target	6	2
Saves	1	2
Ball possession	42%	58%
Corner kicks	4	2
Fouls committed	6	5
Offsides	0	2
Yellow cards	2	0
Red cards	0	0

Overall
Statistic	Chelsea	Arsenal
Goals scored	4	1
Total shots	14	15
Shots on target	8	2
Saves	1	4
Ball possession	48%	52%
Corner kicks	7	5
Fouls committed	14	11
Offsides	1	3
Yellow cards	2	0
Red cards	0	0

== See also ==
- 2019 UEFA Champions League final
- 2019 UEFA Women's Champions League final
- 2019 UEFA Super Cup
- Arsenal F.C.–Chelsea F.C. rivalry
- Arsenal F.C. in European football
- Chelsea F.C. in international football
- English football clubs in international competitions
- List of football matches between British clubs in UEFA competitions
- 2018–19 Arsenal F.C. season
- 2018–19 Chelsea F.C. season
