= 2018–19 UEFA Europa League knockout phase =

European football league season

The 2018–19 UEFA Europa League knockout phase began on 12 February and ended on 29 May 2019 with the final at the Olympic Stadium in Baku, Azerbaijan, to decide the champions of the 2018–19 UEFA Europa League. A total of 32 teams competed in the knockout phase.

For the first time, the video assistant referee (VAR) system was used in the competition, where it was implemented in the final.

Times are CET/CEST, (Note: CET (UTC+1) for dates up to 30 March 2019 (round of 32 and round of 16), and CEST (UTC+2) for dates thereafter (quarter-finals, semi-finals and final).) as listed by UEFA (local times, if different, are in parentheses).

== Round and draw dates ==
The schedule was as follows (all draws were held at the UEFA headquarters in Nyon, Switzerland).

Round	Draw date	First leg	Second leg
Round of 32	17 December 2018, 13:00	14 February 2019	21 February 2019
Round of 16	22 February 2019, 13:00	7 March 2019	14 March 2019
Quarter-finals	15 March 2019, 13:00	11 April 2019	18 April 2019
Semi-finals	15 March 2019, 13:00	2 May 2019	9 May 2019
Final	15 March 2019, 13:00	29 May 2019 at Olympic Stadium, Baku	

Matches could also be played on Tuesdays or Wednesdays instead of the regular Thursdays due to scheduling conflicts.

== Format ==
Each tie in the knockout phase, apart from the final, was played over two legs, with each team playing one leg at home. The team that scored more goals on aggregate over the two legs advanced to the next round. If the aggregate score was level, the away goals rule was applied, i.e. the team that scored more goals away from home over the two legs advanced. If away goals were also equal, then extra time was played. The away goals rule was again applied after extra time, i.e. if there were goals scored during extra time and the aggregate score was still level, the visiting team advanced by more away goals scored. If no goals were scored during extra time, the tie was decided by penalty shoot-out. In the final, which was played as a single match, if the score was level at the end of normal time, extra time would be played, followed by a penalty shoot-out if the score remained tied. The mechanism of the draws for each round was as follows:

- In the draw for the round of 32, the twelve group winners and the four third-placed teams from the Champions League group stage with the better group records were seeded, and the twelve group runners-up and the other four third-placed teams from the Champions League group stage were unseeded. The seeded teams were drawn against the unseeded teams, with the seeded teams hosting the second leg. Teams from the same group or the same association could not be drawn against each other.
- In the draws for the round of 16, quarter-finals, and semi-finals, there were no seedings, and teams from the same group or the same association could be drawn against each other. As the draws for the quarter-finals and semi-finals were held together before the quarter-finals were played, the identity of the quarter-final winners was not known at the time of the semi-final draw. A draw was also held to determine which semi-final winner was designated as the "home" team for the final (for administrative purposes as it was played at a neutral venue).

In the knockout phase, teams from the same city (Chelsea and Arsenal, Galatasaray and Fenerbahçe, and Real Betis and Sevilla) were not scheduled to play at home on the same day, due to logistics and crowd control. To avoid such scheduling conflict, an adjustment had to be made to UEFA. For the round of 32, since both teams were drawn to play at home in a given leg, the home match of the team which was not domestic cup champions in the qualifying season, or the team with the lower domestic ranking (if neither team were the domestic cup champions, i.e. Arsenal, Fenerbahçe, and Sevilla for this season), was moved to an earlier time on Thursday or a different day. For the round of 16, quarter-finals, and semi-finals if the two teams were drawn to play at home for the same leg, the order of legs of the tie involving the team with the lowest priority was reversed from the original draw.

On 17 July 2014, the UEFA emergency panel ruled that Ukrainian and Russian clubs would not be drawn against each other "until further notice" due to the political unrest between the countries.

== Qualified teams ==
The knockout phase involved 32 teams: the 24 teams which qualified as winners and runners-up of each of the twelve groups in the group stage, and the eight third-placed teams from the Champions League group stage.

=== Europa League group stage winners and runners-up ===
Group	Winners (seeded in round of 32 draw)	Runners-up (unseeded in round of 32 draw)
A	(Germany) Bayer Leverkusen	(Switzerland) Zürich
B	(Austria) Red Bull Salzburg	(Scotland) Celtic
C	(Russia) Zenit Saint Petersburg	(Czech Republic) Slavia Prague
D	(Croatia) Dinamo Zagreb	(Turkey) Fenerbahçe
E	(England) Arsenal	(Portugal) Sporting CP
F	(Spain) Real Betis	(Greece) Olympiacos
G	(Spain) Villarreal	(Austria) Rapid Wien
H	(Germany) Eintracht Frankfurt	(Italy) Lazio
I	(Belgium) Genk	(Sweden) Malmö FF
J	(Spain) Sevilla	(Russia) Krasnodar
K	(Ukraine) Dynamo Kyiv	(France) Rennes
L	(England) Chelsea	(Belarus) BATE Borisov

=== Champions League group stage third-placed teams ===
Seed	Grp	Team	Pld	W	D	L	GF	GA	GD	Pts	Seeding
1	C	(Italy) Napoli	6	2	3	1	7	5	+2	9	Seeded in round of 32 draw
2	H	(Spain) Valencia	6	2	2	2	6	6	0	8	Seeded in round of 32 draw
3	B	(Italy) Inter Milan	6	2	2	2	6	7	−1	8	Seeded in round of 32 draw
4	E	(Portugal) Benfica	6	2	1	3	6	11	−5	7	Seeded in round of 32 draw
5	G	(Czech Republic) Viktoria Plzeň	6	2	1	3	7	16	−9	7	Unseeded in round of 32 draw
6	A	(Belgium) Club Brugge	6	1	3	2	6	5	+1	6	Unseeded in round of 32 draw
7	F	(Ukraine) Shakhtar Donetsk	6	1	3	2	8	16	−8	6	Unseeded in round of 32 draw
8	D	(Turkey) Galatasaray	6	1	1	4	5	8	−3	4	Unseeded in round of 32 draw

Source: UEFA
Rules for classification: 1) Points; 2) Goal difference; 3) Goals scored; 4) Away goals scored; 5) Wins; 6) Away wins; 7) Disciplinary points; 8) Club coefficient (UCL Regulations Article 16.04).

== Bracket ==
Round of 32
(Czech Republic) Viktoria Plzeň	2	0	2
(Croatia) Dinamo Zagreb	1	3	4
(Turkey) Galatasaray	1	0	1
(Portugal) Benfica	2	0	2
(Ukraine) Shakhtar Donetsk	2	1	3
(Germany) Eintracht Frankfurt	2	4	6
(Austria) Rapid Wien	0	0	0
(Italy) Inter Milan	1	4	5
(Italy) Lazio	0	0	0
(Spain) Sevilla	1	2	3
(Czech Republic) Slavia Prague	0	4	4
(Belgium) Genk	0	1	1
(Sweden) Malmö FF	1	0	1
(England) Chelsea	2	3	5
(Greece) Olympiacos	2	0	2
(Ukraine) Dynamo Kyiv	2	1	3
(France) Rennes	3	3	6
(Spain) Real Betis	3	1	4
(Belarus) BATE Borisov	1	0	1
(England) Arsenal	0	3	3
(Switzerland) Zürich	1	0	1
(Italy) Napoli	3	2	5
(Belgium) Club Brugge	2	0	2
(Austria) Red Bull Salzburg	1	4	5
(Turkey) Fenerbahçe	1	1	2
(Russia) Zenit Saint Petersburg	0	3	3
(Portugal) Sporting CP	0	1	1
(Spain) Villarreal	1	1	2
(Scotland) Celtic	0	0	0
(Spain) Valencia	2	1	3
(Russia) Krasnodar (a)	0	1	1
(Germany) Bayer Leverkusen	0	1	1

Round of 16
(Croatia) Dinamo Zagreb	1	0	1
(Portugal) Benfica (a.e.t.)	0	3	3
(Germany) Eintracht Frankfurt	0	1	1
(Italy) Inter Milan	0	0	0
(Spain) Sevilla	2	3	5
(Czech Republic) Slavia Prague (a.e.t.)	2	4	6
(England) Chelsea	3	5	8
(Ukraine) Dynamo Kyiv	0	0	0
(France) Rennes	3	0	3
(England) Arsenal	1	3	4
(Italy) Napoli	3	1	4
(Austria) Red Bull Salzburg	0	3	3
(Russia) Zenit Saint Petersburg	1	1	2
(Spain) Villarreal	3	2	5
(Spain) Valencia	2	1	3
(Russia) Krasnodar	1	1	2

Quarter-finals
(Portugal) Benfica	4	0	4
(Germany) Eintracht Frankfurt (a)	2	2	4
(Czech Republic) Slavia Prague	0	3	3
(England) Chelsea	1	4	5
(England) Arsenal	2	1	3
(Italy) Napoli	0	0	0
(Spain) Villarreal	1	0	1
(Spain) Valencia	3	2	5

Semi-finals
(Germany) Eintracht Frankfurt	1	1	2 (3)
(England) Chelsea (p)	1	1	2 (4)
(England) Arsenal	3	4	7
(Spain) Valencia	1	2	3

Final
29 May – Baku
(England) Chelsea	4
(England) Arsenal	1

== Round of 32 ==
The draw for the round of 32 was held on 17 December 2018, 13:00 CET.

=== Summary ===
The first legs were played on 12 and 14 February, and the second legs were played on 20 and 21 February 2019.

Team 1	Agg.	Team 2	1st leg	2nd leg
Viktoria Plzeň (Czech Republic)	2–4	(Croatia) Dinamo Zagreb	2–1	0–3
Club Brugge (Belgium)	2–5	(Austria) Red Bull Salzburg	2–1	0–4
Rapid Wien (Austria)	0–5	(Italy) Inter Milan	0–1	0–4
Slavia Prague (Czech Republic)	4–1	(Belgium) Genk	0–0	4–1
Krasnodar (Russia)	1–1 (a)	(Germany) Bayer Leverkusen	0–0	1–1
Zürich (Switzerland)	1–5	(Italy) Napoli	1–3	0–2
Malmö FF (Sweden)	1–5	(England) Chelsea	1–2	0–3
Shakhtar Donetsk (Ukraine)	3–6	(Germany) Eintracht Frankfurt	2–2	1–4
Celtic (Scotland)	0–3	(Spain) Valencia	0–2	0–1
Rennes (France)	6–4	(Spain) Real Betis	3–3	3–1
Olympiacos (Greece)	2–3	(Ukraine) Dynamo Kyiv	2–2	0–1
Lazio (Italy)	0–3	(Spain) Sevilla	0–1	0–2
Fenerbahçe (Turkey)	2–3	(Russia) Zenit Saint Petersburg	1–0	1–3
Sporting CP (Portugal)	1–2	(Spain) Villarreal	0–1	1–1
BATE Borisov (Belarus)	1–3	(England) Arsenal	1–0	0–3
Galatasaray (Turkey)	1–2	(Portugal) Benfica	1–2	0–0

=== Matches ===
14 February 2019
21:00

Viktoria Plzeň (Czech Republic)	2–1	(Croatia) Dinamo Zagreb
Pernica 54', 83'	Report	Olmo 41'

Doosan Arena, Plzeň
Attendance: 9,731
Referee: Serdar Gözübüyük (Netherlands)
21 February 2019
18:55

Dinamo Zagreb (Croatia)	3–0	(Czech Republic) Viktoria Plzeň
Oršić 15'; Dilaver 34'; Petković 73'	Report

Stadion Maksimir, Zagreb
Attendance: 25,860
Referee: István Kovács (Romania)

Dinamo Zagreb won 4–2 on aggregate.

14 February 2019
21:00

Club Brugge (Belgium)	2–1	(Austria) Red Bull Salzburg
Denswil 64'; Wesley 81'	Report	Junuzović 17'

Jan Breydel Stadium, Bruges
Attendance: 16,457
Referee: Georgi Kabakov (Bulgaria)
21 February 2019
18:55

Red Bull Salzburg (Austria)	4–0	(Belgium) Club Brugge
Schlager 17'; Daka 29', 43'; Dabbur 90+4'	Report

Stadion Wals-Siezenheim, Salzburg
Attendance: 24,717
Referee: Daniel Siebert (Germany)

Red Bull Salzburg won 5–2 on aggregate.

14 February 2019
18:55

Rapid Wien (Austria)	0–1	(Italy) Inter Milan
	Report	Martínez 39' (pen.)

Allianz Stadion, Vienna
Attendance: 23,850
Referee: Tobias Stieller (Germany)
21 February 2019
21:00

Inter Milan (Italy)	4–0	(Austria) Rapid Wien
Vecino 11'; Ranocchia 18'; Perišić 80'; Politano 87'	Report

San Siro, Milan
Attendance: 32,158
Referee: Artur Soares Dias (Portugal)

Inter Milan won 5–0 on aggregate.

14 February 2019
18:55

Slavia Prague (Czech Republic)	0–0	(Belgium) Genk
	Report

Sinobo Stadium, Prague
Attendance: 18,125
Referee: Andris Treimanis (Latvia)
21 February 2019
21:00

Genk (Belgium)	1–4	(Czech Republic) Slavia Prague
Trossard 10'	Report	Coufal 23'; Traoré 54'; Škoda 64', 69'

Luminus Arena, Genk
Attendance: 13,688
Referee: Bobby Madden (Scotland)

Slavia Prague won 4–1 on aggregate.

14 February 2019
18:55 (20:55 UTC+3)

Krasnodar (Russia)	0–0	(Germany) Bayer Leverkusen
	Report

Krasnodar Stadium, Krasnodar
Attendance: 34,827
Referee: Davide Massa (Italy)
21 February 2019
21:00

Bayer Leverkusen (Germany)	1–1	(Russia) Krasnodar
Aránguiz 87'	Report	Suleymanov 84'

BayArena, Leverkusen
Attendance: 16,084
Referee: Gediminas Mažeika (Lithuania)

1–1 on aggregate; Krasnodar won on away goals.

14 February 2019
21:00

Zürich (Switzerland)	1–3	(Italy) Napoli
Kololli 83' (pen.)	Report	Insigne 12'; Callejón 21'; Zieliński 77'

Letzigrund, Zürich
Attendance: 24,000
Referee: Milorad Mažić (Serbia)
21 February 2019
18:55

Napoli (Italy)	2–0	(Switzerland) Zürich
Verdi 43'; Ounas 75'	Report

Stadio San Paolo, Naples
Attendance: 17,579
Referee: Anastasios Sidiropoulos (Greece)

Napoli won 5–1 on aggregate.

14 February 2019
21:00

Malmö FF (Sweden)	1–2	(England) Chelsea
Christiansen 80'	Report	Barkley 30'; Giroud 58'

Stadion, Malmö
Attendance: 20,312
Referee: Aleksei Kulbakov (Belarus)
21 February 2019
21:00 (20:00 UTC+0)

Chelsea (England)	3–0	(Sweden) Malmö FF
Giroud 55'; Barkley 74'; Hudson-Odoi 84'	Report

Stamford Bridge, London
Attendance: 39,813
Referee: Orel Grinfeld (Israel)

Chelsea won 5–1 on aggregate.

14 February 2019
21:00 (22:00 UTC+2)

Shakhtar Donetsk (Ukraine)	2–2	(Germany) Eintracht Frankfurt
Marlos 10' (pen.); Taison 67'	Report	Hinteregger 7'; Kostić 50'

Metalist Stadium, Kharkiv (Note: Shakhtar Donetsk played their home matches at Metalist Stadium, Kharkiv, instead of their regular stadium, the Donbas Arena in Donetsk, due to the war in Donbas.)
Attendance: 13,059
Referee: Anthony Taylor (England)
21 February 2019
18:55

Eintracht Frankfurt (Germany)	4–1	(Ukraine) Shakhtar Donetsk
Jović 23'; Haller 27' (pen.), 80'; Rebić 88'	Report	Júnior Moraes 64'

Waldstadion, Frankfurt
Attendance: 47,000
Referee: Antonio Mateu Lahoz (Spain)

Eintracht Frankfurt won 6–3 on aggregate.

14 February 2019
21:00 (20:00 UTC+0)

Celtic (Scotland)	0–2	(Spain) Valencia
	Report	Cheryshev 42'; Sobrino 49'

Celtic Park, Glasgow
Attendance: 57,430
Referee: Ovidiu Hațegan (Romania)
21 February 2019
18:55

Valencia (Spain)	1–0	(Scotland) Celtic
Gameiro 70'	Report

Mestalla, Valencia
Attendance: 36,619
Referee: Deniz Aytekin (Germany)

Valencia won 3–0 on aggregate.

14 February 2019
18:55

Rennes (France)	3–3	(Spain) Real Betis
Hunou 2'; García 10' (o.g.); Ben Arfa 45+3' (pen.)	Report	Lo Celso 32'; Sidnei 62'; Lainez 90'

Roazhon Park, Rennes
Attendance: 28,656
Referee: Anastasios Sidiropoulos (Greece)
21 February 2019
21:00

Real Betis (Spain)	1–3	(France) Rennes
Lo Celso 41'	Report	Bensebaini 22'; Hunou 30'; Niang 90+4'

Benito Villamarín, Seville
Attendance: 43,623
Referee: Viktor Kassai (Hungary)

Rennes won 6–4 on aggregate.

14 February 2019
18:55 (19:55 UTC+2)

Olympiacos (Greece)	2–2	(Ukraine) Dynamo Kyiv
Hassan 9'; Dias 40'	Report	Buyalskyi 27'; Verbič 89'

Karaiskakis Stadium, Piraeus
Attendance: 31,020
Referee: Craig Pawson (England)
21 February 2019
21:00 (22:00 UTC+2)

Dynamo Kyiv (Ukraine)	1–0	(Greece) Olympiacos
Sol 32'	Report

NSC Olimpiyskiy Stadium, Kyiv
Attendance: 48,902
Referee: Ivan Kružliak (Slovakia)

Dynamo Kyiv won 3–2 on aggregate.

14 February 2019
18:55

Lazio (Italy)	0–1	(Spain) Sevilla
	Report	Ben Yedder 22'

Stadio Olimpico, Rome
Attendance: 19,766
Referee: Slavko Vinčić (Slovenia)
20 February 2019 (Note: The Sevilla v Lazio match was scheduled on 20 February in order to avoid a scheduling conflict with the Real Betis v Rennes match, in the same city.)
18:00

Sevilla (Spain)	2–0	(Italy) Lazio
Ben Yedder 20'; Sarabia 78'	Report

Ramón Sánchez Pizjuán, Seville
Attendance: 34,521
Referee: Anthony Taylor (England)

Sevilla won 3–0 on aggregate.

12 February 2019 (Note: The Fenerbahçe v Zenit Saint Petersburg match was scheduled on 12 February in order to avoid a scheduling conflict with the Galatasaray v Benfica match, in the same city.)
18:55 (20:55 UTC+3)

Fenerbahçe (Turkey)	1–0	(Russia) Zenit Saint Petersburg
Slimani 21'	Report

Şükrü Saracoğlu Stadium, Istanbul
Attendance: 36,572
Referee: Ruddy Buquet (France)
21 February 2019
18:55 (20:55 UTC+3)

Zenit Saint Petersburg (Russia)	3–1	(Turkey) Fenerbahçe
Ozdoyev 4'; Azmoun 37', 76'	Report	Topal 43'

Krestovsky Stadium, Saint Petersburg
Attendance: 50,448
Referee: Michael Oliver (England)

Zenit Saint Petersburg won 3–2 on aggregate.

14 February 2019
21:00 (20:00 UTC+0)

Sporting CP (Portugal)	0–1	(Spain) Villarreal
	Report	Pedraza 3'

Estádio José Alvalade, Lisbon
Attendance: 27,134
Referee: Clément Turpin (France)
21 February 2019
18:55

Villarreal (Spain)	1–1	(Portugal) Sporting CP
Fornals 80'	Report	Fernandes 45+1'

Estadio de la Cerámica, Villarreal
Attendance: 14,098
Referee: Pavel Královec (Czech Republic)

Villarreal won 2–1 on aggregate.

14 February 2019
18:55 (20:55 UTC+3)

BATE Borisov (Belarus)	1–0	(England) Arsenal
Drahun 45'	Report

Borisov Arena, Barysaw
Attendance: 12,527
Referee: Srđan Jovanović (Serbia)
21 February 2019
18:55 (17:55 UTC+0)

Arsenal (England)	3–0	(Belarus) BATE Borisov
Volkov 4' (o.g.); Mustafi 39'; Papastathopoulos 60'	Report

Emirates Stadium, London
Attendance: 58,812
Referee: Alberto Undiano Mallenco (Spain)

Arsenal won 3–1 on aggregate.

14 February 2019
18:55 (20:55 UTC+3)

Galatasaray (Turkey)	1–2	(Portugal) Benfica
Luyindama 54'	Report	Salvio 27' (pen.); Seferovic 64'

Türk Telekom Stadium, Istanbul
Attendance: 42,722
Referee: Jesús Gil Manzano (Spain)
21 February 2019
21:00 (20:00 UTC+0)

Benfica (Portugal)	0–0	(Turkey) Galatasaray
	Report

Estádio da Luz, Lisbon
Attendance: 49,545
Referee: Ovidiu Hațegan (Romania)

Benfica won 2–1 on aggregate.

== Round of 16 ==
The draw for the round of 16 was held on 22 February 2019, 13:00 CET.

=== Summary ===
The first legs were played on 7 March, and the second legs were played on 14 March 2019.

Team 1	Agg.	Team 2	1st leg	2nd leg
Chelsea (England)	8–0	(Ukraine) Dynamo Kyiv	3–0	5–0
Eintracht Frankfurt (Germany)	1–0	(Italy) Inter Milan	0–0	1–0
Dinamo Zagreb (Croatia)	1–3	(Portugal) Benfica	1–0	0–3 (a.e.t.)
Napoli (Italy)	4–3	(Austria) Red Bull Salzburg	3–0	1–3
Valencia (Spain)	3–2	(Russia) Krasnodar	2–1	1–1
Sevilla (Spain)	5–6	(Czech Republic) Slavia Prague	2–2	3–4 (a.e.t.)
Rennes (France)	3–4 (Note: Order of legs reversed after original draw, in order to avoid a scheduling conflict with the Chelsea v Dynamo Kyiv match in the same city.)	(England) Arsenal	3–1	0–3
Zenit Saint Petersburg (Russia)	2–5	(Spain) Villarreal	1–3	1–2

=== Matches ===
7 March 2019
21:00 (20:00 UTC+0)

Chelsea (England)	3–0	(Ukraine) Dynamo Kyiv
Pedro 17'; Willian 65'; Hudson-Odoi 90'	Report

Stamford Bridge, London
Attendance: 37,280
Referee: Slavko Vinčić (Slovenia)
14 March 2019
18:55 (19:55 UTC+2)

Dynamo Kyiv (Ukraine)	0–5	(England) Chelsea
	Report	Giroud 5', 33', 59'; Alonso 45+1'; Hudson-Odoi 78'

NSC Olimpiyskiy Stadium, Kyiv
Attendance: 64,830
Referee: Tobias Stieller (Germany)

Chelsea won 8–0 on aggregate.

7 March 2019
18:55

Eintracht Frankfurt (Germany)	0–0	(Italy) Inter Milan
	Report

Commerzbank-Arena, Frankfurt
Attendance: 48,000
Referee: Willie Collum (Scotland)
14 March 2019
21:00

Inter Milan (Italy)	0–1	(Germany) Eintracht Frankfurt
	Report	Jović 6'

San Siro, Milan
Attendance: 49,866
Referee: Ovidiu Hațegan (Romania)

Eintracht Frankfurt won 1–0 on aggregate.

7 March 2019
18:55

Dinamo Zagreb (Croatia)	1–0	(Portugal) Benfica
Petković 38' (pen.)	Report

Stadion Maksimir, Zagreb
Attendance: 29,704
Referee: Michael Oliver (England)
14 March 2019
21:00 (20:00 UTC+0)

Benfica (Portugal)	3–0 (a.e.t.)	(Croatia) Dinamo Zagreb
Jonas 71'; Ferro 94'; Grimaldo 105'	Report

Estádio da Luz, Lisbon
Attendance: 47,808
Referee: Deniz Aytekin (Germany)

Benfica won 3–1 on aggregate.

7 March 2019
21:00

Napoli (Italy)	3–0	(Austria) Red Bull Salzburg
Milik 10'; Fabián 18'; Onguéné 58' (o.g.)	Report

Stadio San Paolo, Naples
Attendance: 32,579
Referee: Aleksei Kulbakov (Belarus)
14 March 2019
18:55

Red Bull Salzburg (Austria)	3–1	(Italy) Napoli
Dabbur 25'; Gulbrandsen 65'; Leitgeb 90+2'	Report	Milik 14'

Stadion Wals-Siezenheim, Salzburg
Attendance: 29,520
Referee: Carlos del Cerro Grande (Spain)

Napoli won 4–3 on aggregate.

7 March 2019
21:00

Valencia (Spain)	2–1	(Russia) Krasnodar
Rodrigo 12', 24'	Report	Claesson 63'

Mestalla, Valencia
Attendance: 36,274
Referee: Orel Grinfeld (Israel)
14 March 2019
18:55 (20:55 UTC+3)

Krasnodar (Russia)	1–1	(Spain) Valencia
Suleymanov 85'	Report	Guedes 90+3'

Krasnodar Stadium, Krasnodar
Attendance: 35,074
Referee: Anthony Taylor (England)

Valencia won 3–2 on aggregate.

7 March 2019
18:55

Sevilla (Spain)	2–2	(Czech Republic) Slavia Prague
Ben Yedder 1'; Munir 28'	Report	Stoch 25'; Král 39'

Ramón Sánchez Pizjuán, Seville
Attendance: 30,698
Referee: Ruddy Buquet (France)
14 March 2019
21:00

Slavia Prague (Czech Republic)	4–3 (a.e.t.)	(Spain) Sevilla
Ngadeu-Ngadjui 15'; Souček 47' (pen.); Van Buren 102'; Traoré 119'	Report	Ben Yedder 44' (pen.); Munir 54'; Vázquez 98'

Sinobo Stadium, Prague
Attendance: 19,020
Referee: Aleksei Kulbakov (Belarus)

Slavia Prague won 6–5 on aggregate.

7 March 2019
18:55

Rennes (France)	3–1	(England) Arsenal
Bourigeaud 42'; Monreal 65' (o.g.); Sarr 88'	Report	Iwobi 4'

Roazhon Park, Rennes
Attendance: 29,100
Referee: Ivan Kružliak (Slovakia)
14 March 2019
21:00 (20:00 UTC+0)

Arsenal (England)	3–0	(France) Rennes
Aubameyang 5', 72'; Maitland-Niles 15'	Report

Emirates Stadium, London
Attendance: 59,453
Referee: Andris Treimanis (Latvia)

Arsenal won 4–3 on aggregate.

7 March 2019
18:55 (20:55 UTC+3)

Zenit Saint Petersburg (Russia)	1–3	(Spain) Villarreal
Azmoun 35'	Report	Iborra 33'; Gerard 64'; Morlanes 71'

Krestovsky Stadium, Saint Petersburg
Attendance: 51,826
Referee: Gianluca Rocchi (Italy)
14 March 2019
21:00

Villarreal (Spain)	2–1	(Russia) Zenit Saint Petersburg
Gerard 29'; Bacca 47'	Report	Ivanović 90+1'

Estadio de la Cerámica, Villarreal
Attendance: 14,027
Referee: Artur Soares Dias (Portugal)

Villarreal won 5–2 on aggregate.

== Quarter-finals ==
The draw for the quarter-finals was held on 15 March 2019, 13:00 CET.

=== Summary ===
The first legs were played on 11 April, and the second legs were played on 18 April 2019.

Team 1	Agg.	Team 2	1st leg	2nd leg
Arsenal (England)	3–0 (Note: Order of legs reversed after original draw, in order to avoid a scheduling conflict with the Chelsea v Slavia Prague match in the same city.)	(Italy) Napoli	2–0	1–0
Villarreal (Spain)	1–5	(Spain) Valencia	1–3	0–2
Benfica (Portugal)	4–4 (a)	(Germany) Eintracht Frankfurt	4–2	0–2
Slavia Prague (Czech Republic)	3–5	(England) Chelsea	0–1	3–4

=== Matches ===
11 April 2019
21:00 (20:00 UTC+1)

Arsenal (England)	2–0	(Italy) Napoli
Ramsey 15'; Koulibaly 25' (o.g.)	Report

Emirates Stadium, London
Attendance: 59,738
Referee: Alberto Undiano Mallenco (Spain)
18 April 2019
21:00

Napoli (Italy)	0–1	(England) Arsenal
	Report	Lacazette 36'

Stadio San Paolo, Naples
Attendance: 39,438
Referee: Ovidiu Hațegan (Romania)

Arsenal won 3–0 on aggregate.

11 April 2019
21:00

Villarreal (Spain)	1–3	(Spain) Valencia
Cazorla 36' (pen.)	Report	Guedes 6', 90+3'; Wass 90+1'

Estadio de la Cerámica, Villarreal
Attendance: 17,605
Referee: Michael Oliver (England)
18 April 2019
21:00

Valencia (Spain)	2–0	(Spain) Villarreal
Lato 13'; Parejo 54'	Report

Mestalla, Valencia
Attendance: 26,403
Referee: Willie Collum (Scotland)

Valencia won 5–1 on aggregate.

11 April 2019
21:00 (20:00 UTC+1)

Benfica (Portugal)	4–2	(Germany) Eintracht Frankfurt
Félix 21' (pen.), 43', 54'; Dias 50'	Report	Jović 40'; Paciência 72'

Estádio da Luz, Lisbon
Attendance: 54,175
Referee: Anthony Taylor (England)
18 April 2019
21:00

Eintracht Frankfurt (Germany)	2–0	(Portugal) Benfica
Kostić 37'; Rode 67'	Report

Commerzbank-Arena, Frankfurt
Attendance: 48,000
Referee: Daniele Orsato (Italy)

4–4 on aggregate; Eintracht Frankfurt won on away goals.

11 April 2019
21:00

Slavia Prague (Czech Republic)	0–1	(England) Chelsea
	Report	Alonso 86'

Sinobo Stadium, Prague
Attendance: 17,484
Referee: Felix Zwayer (Germany)
18 April 2019
21:00 (20:00 UTC+1)

Chelsea (England)	4–3	(Czech Republic) Slavia Prague
Pedro 5', 27'; Deli 10' (o.g.); Giroud 17'	Report	Souček 26'; Ševčík 51', 55'

Stamford Bridge, London
Attendance: 38,326
Referee: Damir Skomina (Slovenia)

Chelsea won 5–3 on aggregate.

== Semi-finals ==
The draw for the semi-finals was held on 15 March 2019, 13:00 CET (after the quarter-final draw).

=== Summary ===
The first legs were played on 2 May, and the second legs were played on 9 May 2019.

Team 1	Agg.	Team 2	1st leg	2nd leg
Arsenal (England)	7–3	(Spain) Valencia	3–1	4–2
Eintracht Frankfurt (Germany)	2–2 (3–4 p)	(England) Chelsea	1–1	1–1 (a.e.t.)

=== Matches ===
2 May 2019
21:00 (20:00 UTC+1)

Arsenal (England)	3–1	(Spain) Valencia
Lacazette 18', 26'; Aubameyang 90+1'	Report	Diakhaby 11'

Emirates Stadium, London
Attendance: 58,969
Referee: Clément Turpin (France)
9 May 2019
21:00

Valencia (Spain)	2–4	(England) Arsenal
Gameiro 11', 58'	Report	Aubameyang 17', 69', 88'; Lacazette 50'

Mestalla, Valencia
Attendance: 44,481
Referee: Danny Makkelie (Netherlands)

Arsenal won 7–3 on aggregate.

2 May 2019
21:00

Eintracht Frankfurt (Germany)	1–1	(England) Chelsea
Jović 23'	Report	Pedro 45'

Waldstadion, Frankfurt
Attendance: 48,000
Referee: Carlos del Cerro Grande (Spain)
9 May 2019
21:00 (20:00 UTC+1)

Chelsea (England)	1–1 (a.e.t.)	(Germany) Eintracht Frankfurt
Loftus-Cheek 28'	Report	Jović 49'
Penalties
Barkley (penalty scored); Azpilicueta (penalty missed); Jorginho (penalty scored); David Luiz (penalty scored); Hazard (penalty scored)	4–3	(penalty scored) Haller; (penalty scored) Jović; (penalty scored) De Guzmán; (penalty missed) Hinteregger; (penalty missed) Paciência

Stamford Bridge, London
Attendance: 36,070
Referee: Ovidiu Hațegan (Romania)

2–2 on aggregate; Chelsea won 4–3 on penalties.

== Final ==
The final was played on 29 May 2019 at the Olympic Stadium in Baku. The "home" team (for administrative purposes) was determined by an additional draw held after the quarter-final and semi-final draws.

29 May 2019
21:00 (23:00 UTC+4)

Chelsea (England)	4–1	(England) Arsenal
Giroud 49'; Pedro 60'; Hazard 65' (pen.), 72'	Report	Iwobi 69'

Olympic Stadium, Baku
Attendance: 51,370
Referee: Gianluca Rocchi (Italy)
