= 2018–19 UEFA Europa League group stage =

The 2018–19 UEFA Europa League group stage began on 20 September and ended on 13 December 2018. A total of 48 teams competed in the group stage to decide 24 of the 32 places in the knockout phase of the 2018–19 UEFA Europa League.

== Draw ==
The draw for the group stage was held on 31 August 2018, 13:00 CEST, at the Grimaldi Forum in Monaco.

The 48 teams were drawn into twelve groups of four, with the restriction that teams from the same association could not be drawn against each other. For the draw, the teams were seeded into four pots based on their 2018 UEFA club coefficients.

On 17 July 2014, the UEFA emergency panel ruled that Ukrainian and Russian clubs would not be drawn against each other "until further notice" due to the political unrest between the countries.

Moreover, the draw was controlled for teams from the same association in order to split the teams evenly into the two sets of six groups (A–F, G–L) for maximum television coverage. On each matchday, one set of six groups played their matches at 18:55 CET/CEST, while the other set of six groups played their matches at 21:00 CET/CEST, with the two sets of groups alternating between each matchday. The following pairings were announced by UEFA after the group stage teams were confirmed:

- (Spain) Real Betis and Sevilla
- (Germany) Eintracht Frankfurt and RB Leipzig
- (England) Chelsea and Arsenal
- (Italy) Lazio and Milan
- (France) Marseille and Bordeaux
- (Russia) Spartak Moscow and Zenit Saint Petersburg
- (Ukraine) Dynamo Kyiv and Vorskla Poltava
- (Belgium) Standard Liège and Anderlecht
- (Turkey) Fenerbahçe and Beşiktaş
- (Czech Republic) Slavia Prague and Jablonec
- (Greece) PAOK and Olympiacos
- (Austria) Red Bull Salzburg and Rapid Wien
- (Scotland) Celtic and Rangers
- (Cyprus) AEK Larnaca and Apollon Limassol
- (Norway) Rosenborg and Sarpsborg 08

The fixtures were decided after the draw, using a computer draw not shown to public, with the following match sequence (Regulations Article 15.02):

Group stage schedule
Matchday	Date	Matches (Note: Positions for scheduling did not use the seeding pots, e.g., Team 1 was not necessarily the team from Pot 1 in the draw.)
Matchday 1	20 September 2018	2 v 3, 4 v 1
Matchday 2	4 October 2018	1 v 2, 3 v 4
Matchday 3	25 October 2018	3 v 1, 2 v 4
Matchday 4	8 November 2018	1 v 3, 4 v 2
Matchday 5	29 November 2018	3 v 2, 1 v 4
Matchday 6	13 December 2018	2 v 1, 4 v 3

There were scheduling restrictions: for example, teams from the same city (e.g., Arsenal and Chelsea) in general were not scheduled to play at home on the same matchday (to avoid them playing at home on the same day, due to logistics and crowd control), and teams from "winter countries" (e.g., Russia) were not scheduled to play at home on the last matchday (due to cold weather).

== Teams ==
Below were the participating teams (with their 2018 UEFA club coefficients), grouped by their seeding pot. They included:

- 17 teams which entered in the group stage
- 21 winners of the play-off round (8 from Champions Path, 13 from Main Path)
- 6 losers of the Champions League play-off round (4 from Champions Path, 2 from League Path)
- 4 League Path losers of the Champions League third qualifying round

Key to colours
Group winners and runners-up advanced to round of 32

Pot 1
Team	Notes	Coeff.
(Spain) Sevilla		113.000
(England) Arsenal		93.000
(England) Chelsea		82.000
(Russia) Zenit Saint Petersburg		78.000
(Germany) Bayer Leverkusen		66.000
(Ukraine) Dynamo Kyiv		62.000
(Turkey) Beşiktaş		57.000
(Austria) Red Bull Salzburg		55.500
(Greece) Olympiacos		54.000
(Spain) Villarreal		52.000
(Belgium) Anderlecht		48.000
(Italy) Lazio		41.000

Pot 2
Team	Notes	Coeff.
(Portugal) Sporting CP		40.000
(Bulgaria) Ludogorets Razgrad		37.000
(Denmark) Copenhagen		34.000
(France) Marseille		32.000
(Scotland) Celtic		31.000
(Greece) PAOK		29.500
(Italy) Milan		28.000
(Belgium) Genk		27.000
(Turkey) Fenerbahçe		23.500
(Russia) Krasnodar		23.500
(Kazakhstan) Astana		21.750
(Austria) Rapid Wien		21.500

Pot 3
Team	Notes	Coeff.
(Spain) Real Betis		21.399
(Azerbaijan) Qarabağ		20.500
(Belarus) BATE Borisov		20.500
(Croatia) Dinamo Zagreb		17.500
(Germany) RB Leipzig		17.000
(Germany) Eintracht Frankfurt		14.285
(Sweden) Malmö FF		14.000
(Russia) Spartak Moscow		13.500
(Belgium) Standard Liège		12.500
(Switzerland) Zürich		12.000
(France) Bordeaux		11.283
(France) Rennes		11.283

Pot 4
Team	Notes	Coeff.
(Cyprus) Apollon Limassol		10.000
(Norway) Rosenborg		9.000
(Ukraine) Vorskla Poltava		8.226
(Czech Republic) Slavia Prague		7.500
(Turkey) Akhisarspor		7.160
(Czech Republic) Jablonec		6.035
(Cyprus) AEK Larnaca		4.310
(Hungary) Vidi		4.250
(Scotland) Rangers		3.725
(Luxembourg) F91 Dudelange		3.500
(Slovakia) Spartak Trnava		3.500
(Norway) Sarpsborg 08		3.485

Notes

1. ^{EL-CP} Winners of play-off round (Champions Path).
2. ^{EL-MP} Winners of play-off round (Main Path).
3. ^{CL-CP} Losers of Champions League play-off round (Champions Path).
4. ^{CL-LP} Losers of Champions League play-off round (League Path).
5. ^{CL-LQ} Losers of Champions League third qualifying round (League Path).

== Format ==
In each group, teams played against each other home-and-away in a round-robin format. The group winners and runners-up advanced to the round of 32, where they were joined by the eight third-placed teams of the Champions League group stage.

=== Tiebreakers ===
Teams were ranked according to points (3 points for a win, 1 point for a draw, 0 points for a loss), and if tied on points, the following tiebreaking criteria were applied, in the order given, to determine the rankings (Regulations Articles 16.01):

1. Points in head-to-head matches among tied teams;
2. Goal difference in head-to-head matches among tied teams;
3. Goals scored in head-to-head matches among tied teams;
4. Away goals scored in head-to-head matches among tied teams;
5. If more than two teams were tied, and after applying all head-to-head criteria above, a subset of teams were still tied, all head-to-head criteria above were reapplied exclusively to this subset of teams;
6. Goal difference in all group matches;
7. Goals scored in all group matches;
8. Away goals scored in all group matches;
9. Wins in all group matches;
10. Away wins in all group matches;
11. Disciplinary points (red card = 3 points, yellow card = 1 point, expulsion for two yellow cards in one match = 3 points);
12. UEFA club coefficient.

== Groups ==
The matchdays were 20 September, 4 October, 25 October, 8 November, 29 November, and 13 December 2018. The scheduled kickoff times were 18:55 and 21:00 CET/CEST, except for a few matches whose kickoff times were 16:50 CET/CEST.

Times are CET/CEST, (Note: CEST (UTC+2) for dates up to 27 October 2018 (matchdays 1–3), and CET (UTC+1) for dates thereafter (matchdays 4–6).) as listed by UEFA (local times, if different, are in parentheses).

=== Group A ===
Pos	Team	Pld	W	D	L	GF	GA	GD	Pts	Qualification	LEV	ZUR	AKL	LUD
1	(Germany) Bayer Leverkusen	6	4	1	1	16	9	+7	13	Advance to knockout phase	—	1–0	4–2	1–1
2	(Switzerland) Zürich	6	3	1	2	7	6	+1	10	Advance to knockout phase	3–2	—	1–2	1–0
3	(Cyprus) AEK Larnaca	6	1	2	3	6	12	−6	5		1–5	0–1	—	1–1
4	(Bulgaria) Ludogorets Razgrad	6	0	4	2	5	7	−2	4		2–3	1–1	0–0	—

Source: UEFA
Rules for classification: Group stage tiebreakers
20 September 2018
21:00 (22:00 UTC+3)

AEK Larnaca (Cyprus)	0–1	(Switzerland) Zürich
	Report	Kololli 61' (pen.)

GSP Stadium, Nicosia (Note: AEK Larnaca played their home matches at GSP Stadium, Nicosia, instead of their regular stadium AEK Arena – Georgios Karapatakis, Larnaca.)
Attendance: 3,173
Referee: Jonathan Lardot (Belgium)
20 September 2018
21:00 (22:00 UTC+3)

Ludogorets Razgrad (Bulgaria)	2–3	(Germany) Bayer Leverkusen
Keșerü 8'; Marcelinho 31'	Report	Havertz 38', 69'; Kiese Thelin 63'

Ludogorets Arena, Razgrad
Attendance: 8,240
Referee: Paolo Mazzoleni (Italy)

4 October 2018
18:55

Bayer Leverkusen (Germany)	4–2	(Cyprus) AEK Larnaca
Havertz 44'; Alario 49', 88'; Brandt 90+2'	Report	Trichkovski 25'; Raspas 90+1'

BayArena, Leverkusen
Attendance: 23,354
Referee: Yevhen Aranovskyi (Ukraine)
4 October 2018
18:55

Zürich (Switzerland)	1–0	(Bulgaria) Ludogorets Razgrad
Pálsson 84'	Report

Letzigrund, Zürich
Attendance: 7,092
Referee: Juan Martínez Munuera (Spain)

25 October 2018
18:55

Zürich (Switzerland)	3–2	(Germany) Bayer Leverkusen
Marchesano 44'; Domgjoni 59'; Odey 78'	Report	Bellarabi 50', 54'

Letzigrund, Zürich
Attendance: 12,427
Referee: Aliyar Aghayev (Azerbaijan)
25 October 2018
18:55 (19:55 UTC+3)

AEK Larnaca (Cyprus)	1–1	(Bulgaria) Ludogorets Razgrad
Larena 25' (pen.)	Report	Lukoki 7'

GSP Stadium, Nicosia
Attendance: 2,631
Referee: Enea Jorgji (Albania)

8 November 2018
21:00

Bayer Leverkusen (Germany)	1–0	(Switzerland) Zürich
Jedvaj 60'	Report

BayArena, Leverkusen
Attendance: 16,179
Referee: Paweł Gil (Poland)
8 November 2018
21:00 (22:00 UTC+2)

Ludogorets Razgrad (Bulgaria)	0–0	(Cyprus) AEK Larnaca
	Report

Ludogorets Arena, Razgrad
Attendance: 4,520
Referee: Ola Hobber Nilsen (Norway)

29 November 2018
18:55

Zürich (Switzerland)	1–2	(Cyprus) AEK Larnaca
Khelifi 74'	Report	Giannou 38'; Trichkovski 85'

Letzigrund, Zürich
Attendance: 6,107
Referee: Aleksei Eskov (Russia)
29 November 2018
18:55

Bayer Leverkusen (Germany)	1–1	(Bulgaria) Ludogorets Razgrad
Weiser 85'	Report	Marcelinho 69'

BayArena, Leverkusen
Attendance: 16,066
Referee: Dennis Higler (Netherlands)

13 December 2018
21:00 (22:00 UTC+2)

AEK Larnaca (Cyprus)	1–5	(Germany) Bayer Leverkusen
Català 26'	Report	Kohr 28', 68'; Alario 41' (pen.), 86'; Paulinho 78'

GSP Stadium, Nicosia
Attendance: 1,584
Referee: François Letexier (France)
13 December 2018
21:00 (22:00 UTC+2)

Ludogorets Razgrad (Bulgaria)	1–1	(Switzerland) Zürich
Świerczok 45+1'	Report	Forster 21' (o.g.)

Ludogorets Arena, Razgrad
Attendance: 2,150
Referee: Kirill Levnikov (Russia)

=== Group B ===
Pos	Team	Pld	W	D	L	GF	GA	GD	Pts	Qualification	SAL	CEL	RBL	ROS
1	(Austria) Red Bull Salzburg	6	6	0	0	17	6	+11	18	Advance to knockout phase	—	3–1	1–0	3–0
2	(Scotland) Celtic	6	3	0	3	6	8	−2	9	Advance to knockout phase	1–2	—	2–1	1–0
3	(Germany) RB Leipzig	6	2	1	3	9	8	+1	7		2–3	2–0	—	1–1
4	(Norway) Rosenborg	6	0	1	5	4	14	−10	1		2–5	0–1	1–3	—

Source: UEFA
Rules for classification: Group stage tiebreakers
20 September 2018
21:00

RB Leipzig (Germany)	2–3	(Austria) Red Bull Salzburg
Laimer 70'; Poulsen 82'	Report	Dabbur 20'; Haidara 22'; Gulbrandsen 89'

Red Bull Arena, Leipzig
Attendance: 24,057
Referee: Andreas Ekberg (Sweden)
20 September 2018
21:00 (20:00 UTC+1)

Celtic (Scotland)	1–0	(Norway) Rosenborg
Griffiths 87'	Report

Celtic Park, Glasgow
Attendance: 47,287
Referee: Paweł Gil (Poland)

4 October 2018
18:55

Rosenborg (Norway)	1–3	(Germany) RB Leipzig
Jebali 79'	Report	Augustin 12'; Konaté 54'; Cunha 61'

Lerkendal Stadion, Trondheim
Attendance: 11,484
Referee: Marco Guida (Italy)
4 October 2018
18:55

Red Bull Salzburg (Austria)	3–1	(Scotland) Celtic
Dabbur 55', 73' (pen.); Minamino 61'	Report	Édouard 2'

Red Bull Arena, Salzburg
Attendance: 24,085
Referee: Serhiy Boyko (Ukraine)

25 October 2018
18:55

Red Bull Salzburg (Austria)	3–0	(Norway) Rosenborg
Dabbur 34', 59' (pen.); Wolf 53'	Report

Red Bull Arena, Salzburg
Attendance: 20,639
Referee: Irfan Peljto (Bosnia and Herzegovina)
25 October 2018
18:55

RB Leipzig (Germany)	2–0	(Scotland) Celtic
Cunha 31'; Bruma 35'	Report

Red Bull Arena, Leipzig
Attendance: 38,126
Referee: Pavel Královec (Czech Republic)

8 November 2018
21:00

Rosenborg (Norway)	2–5	(Austria) Red Bull Salzburg
Adegbenro 52'; Jensen 62'	Report	Minamino 6', 19', 45'; Gulbrandsen 37'; Hovland 57' (o.g.)

Lerkendal Stadion, Trondheim
Attendance: 12,386
Referee: Aleksei Eskov (Russia)
8 November 2018
21:00 (20:00 UTC+0)

Celtic (Scotland)	2–1	(Germany) RB Leipzig
Tierney 11'; Édouard 79'	Report	Augustin 78'

Celtic Park, Glasgow
Attendance: 56,027
Referee: Xavier Estrada Fernández (Spain)

29 November 2018
18:55

Red Bull Salzburg (Austria)	1–0	(Germany) RB Leipzig
Gulbrandsen 74'	Report

Red Bull Arena, Salzburg
Attendance: 29,520
Referee: Orel Grinfeld (Israel)
29 November 2018
18:55

Rosenborg (Norway)	0–1	(Scotland) Celtic
	Report	Sinclair 42'

Lerkendal Stadion, Trondheim
Attendance: 14,061
Referee: Halis Özkahya (Turkey)

13 December 2018
21:00

RB Leipzig (Germany)	1–1	(Norway) Rosenborg
Cunha 47'	Report	Reginiussen 86'

Red Bull Arena, Leipzig
Attendance: 16,957
Referee: Serhiy Boyko (Ukraine)
13 December 2018
21:00 (20:00 UTC+0)

Celtic (Scotland)	1–2	(Austria) Red Bull Salzburg
Ntcham 90+5'	Report	Dabbur 67'; Gulbrandsen 78'

Celtic Park, Glasgow
Attendance: 57,578
Referee: Ruddy Buquet (France)

=== Group C ===
Pos	Team	Pld	W	D	L	GF	GA	GD	Pts	Qualification	ZEN	SLP	BOR	KOB
1	(Russia) Zenit Saint Petersburg	6	3	2	1	6	5	+1	11	Advance to knockout phase	—	1–0	2–1	1–0
2	(Czech Republic) Slavia Prague	6	3	1	2	4	3	+1	10	Advance to knockout phase	2–0	—	1–0	0–0
3	(France) Bordeaux	6	2	1	3	6	6	0	7		1–1	2–0	—	1–2
4	(Denmark) Copenhagen	6	1	2	3	3	5	−2	5		1–1	0–1	0–1	—

Source: UEFA
Rules for classification: Group stage tiebreakers
20 September 2018
21:00

Copenhagen (Denmark)	1–1	(Russia) Zenit Saint Petersburg
Sotiriou 63'	Report	Mak 44'

Parken Stadium, Copenhagen
Attendance: 19,005
Referee: Georgi Kabakov (Bulgaria)
20 September 2018
21:00

Slavia Prague (Czech Republic)	1–0	(France) Bordeaux
Zmrhal 35'	Report

Eden Arena, Prague
Attendance: 16,548
Referee: Bas Nijhuis (Netherlands)

4 October 2018
18:55

Bordeaux (France)	1–2	(Denmark) Copenhagen
Sankharé 84'	Report	Sotiriou 42'; Skov 90+2'

Nouveau Stade de Bordeaux, Bordeaux
Attendance: 11,860
Referee: Roi Reinshreiber (Israel)
4 October 2018
18:55 (19:55 UTC+3)

Zenit Saint Petersburg (Russia)	1–0	(Czech Republic) Slavia Prague
Kokorin 80'	Report

Krestovsky Stadium, Saint Petersburg
Attendance: 45,408
Referee: Hüseyin Göçek (Turkey)

25 October 2018
18:55 (19:55 UTC+3)

Zenit Saint Petersburg (Russia)	2–1	(France) Bordeaux
Dzyuba 41'; Kuzyayev 85'	Report	Briand 26'

Krestovsky Stadium, Saint Petersburg
Attendance: 45,723
Referee: Felix Brych (Germany)
25 October 2018
18:55

Copenhagen (Denmark)	0–1	(Czech Republic) Slavia Prague
	Report	Matoušek 46'

Parken Stadium, Copenhagen
Attendance: 20,672
Referee: Luca Banti (Italy)

8 November 2018
21:00

Bordeaux (France)	1–1	(Russia) Zenit Saint Petersburg
Kamano 35' (pen.)	Report	Zabolotny 72'

Nouveau Stade de Bordeaux, Bordeaux
Attendance: 8,907
Referee: Harald Lechner (Austria)
8 November 2018
21:00

Slavia Prague (Czech Republic)	0–0	(Denmark) Copenhagen
	Report

Eden Arena, Prague
Attendance: 18,702
Referee: Mattias Gestranius (Finland)

29 November 2018
18:55 (20:55 UTC+3)

Zenit Saint Petersburg (Russia)	1–0	(Denmark) Copenhagen
Mak 59'	Report

Krestovsky Stadium, Saint Petersburg
Attendance: 45,199
Referee: Slavko Vinčić (Slovenia)
29 November 2018
18:55

Bordeaux (France)	2–0	(Czech Republic) Slavia Prague
De Préville 49'; Koundé 90+5'	Report

Nouveau Stade de Bordeaux, Bordeaux
Attendance: 6,311
Referee: Fábio Veríssimo (Portugal)

13 December 2018
21:00

Copenhagen (Denmark)	0–1	(France) Bordeaux
	Report	Briand 73'

Parken Stadium, Copenhagen
Attendance: 18,209
Referee: Hüseyin Göçek (Turkey)
13 December 2018
21:00

Slavia Prague (Czech Republic)	2–0	(Russia) Zenit Saint Petersburg
Zmrhal 32'; Stoch 41'	Report

Eden Arena, Prague
Attendance: 17,748
Referee: Andrew Dallas (Scotland)

=== Group D ===
Pos	Team	Pld	W	D	L	GF	GA	GD	Pts	Qualification	DZG	FEN	SPT	AND
1	(Croatia) Dinamo Zagreb	6	4	2	0	11	3	+8	14	Advance to knockout phase	—	4–1	3–1	0–0
2	(Turkey) Fenerbahçe	6	2	2	2	7	7	0	8	Advance to knockout phase	0–0	—	2–0	2–0
3	(Slovakia) Spartak Trnava	6	2	1	3	4	7	−3	7		1–2	1–0	—	1–0
4	(Belgium) Anderlecht	6	0	3	3	2	7	−5	3		0–2	2–2	0–0	—

Source: UEFA
Rules for classification: Group stage tiebreakers
20 September 2018
21:00

Spartak Trnava (Slovakia)	1–0	(Belgium) Anderlecht
Oravec 79'	Report

Štadión Antona Malatinského, Trnava
Attendance: 17,114
Referee: Kevin Clancy (Scotland)
20 September 2018
21:00

Dinamo Zagreb (Croatia)	4–1	(Turkey) Fenerbahçe
Šunjić 16'; Hajrović 27', 57'; Olmo 60'	Report	Neustädter 47'

Stadion Maksimir, Zagreb
Attendance: 17,303
Referee: Craig Pawson (England)

4 October 2018
18:55 (19:55 UTC+3)

Fenerbahçe (Turkey)	2–0	(Slovakia) Spartak Trnava
Slimani 52', 69'	Report

Şükrü Saracoğlu Stadium, Istanbul
Attendance: 29,622
Referee: Tobias Welz (Germany)
4 October 2018
18:55

Anderlecht (Belgium)	0–2	(Croatia) Dinamo Zagreb
	Report	Hajrović 19' (pen.); Gojak 68'

Constant Vanden Stock Stadium, Brussels
Attendance: 12,137
Referee: Vladislav Bezborodov (Russia)

25 October 2018
18:55

Anderlecht (Belgium)	2–2	(Turkey) Fenerbahçe
Bakkali 35', 50'	Report	Frey 53'; Kaldırım 57'

Constant Vanden Stock Stadium, Brussels
Attendance: 13,292
Referee: Georgi Kabakov (Bulgaria)
25 October 2018
18:55

Spartak Trnava (Slovakia)	1–2	(Croatia) Dinamo Zagreb
Ghorbani 32'	Report	Gavranović 64'; Oršić 77'

Štadión Antona Malatinského, Trnava
Attendance: 0 (Note: The Spartak Trnava v Dinamo Zagreb match was played behind closed doors as punishment for the racist actions of Spartak Trnava supporters in their match against Anderlecht.)
Referee: Jakob Kehlet (Denmark)

8 November 2018
16:50 (18:50 UTC+3)

Fenerbahçe (Turkey)	2–0	(Belgium) Anderlecht
Valbuena 71'; Frey 74'	Report

Şükrü Saracoğlu Stadium, Istanbul
Attendance: 32,789
Referee: Andreas Ekberg (Sweden)
8 November 2018
21:00

Dinamo Zagreb (Croatia)	3–1	(Slovakia) Spartak Trnava
Gojak 22'; Kadlec 36' (o.g.); Oršić 79'	Report	Chanturishvili 63'

Stadion Maksimir, Zagreb
Attendance: 18,154
Referee: Serhiy Boyko (Ukraine)

29 November 2018
18:55

Anderlecht (Belgium)	0–0	(Slovakia) Spartak Trnava
	Report

Constant Vanden Stock Stadium, Brussels
Attendance: 8,063
Referee: Anastasios Papapetrou (Greece)
29 November 2018
18:55 (20:55 UTC+3)

Fenerbahçe (Turkey)	0–0	(Croatia) Dinamo Zagreb
	Report

Şükrü Saracoğlu Stadium, Istanbul
Attendance: 24,776
Referee: Robert Schörgenhofer (Austria)

13 December 2018
21:00

Spartak Trnava (Slovakia)	1–0	(Turkey) Fenerbahçe
Yilmaz 41'	Report

Štadión Antona Malatinského, Trnava
Attendance: 11,413
Referee: José María Sánchez Martínez (Spain)
13 December 2018
21:00

Dinamo Zagreb (Croatia)	0–0	(Belgium) Anderlecht
	Report

Stadion Maksimir, Zagreb
Attendance: 12,170
Referee: Sandro Schärer (Switzerland)

=== Group E ===
Pos	Team	Pld	W	D	L	GF	GA	GD	Pts	Qualification	ARS	SPO	VOR	QRB
1	(England) Arsenal	6	5	1	0	12	2	+10	16	Advance to knockout phase	—	0–0	4–2	1–0
2	(Portugal) Sporting CP	6	4	1	1	13	3	+10	13	Advance to knockout phase	0–1	—	3–0	2–0
3	(Ukraine) Vorskla Poltava	6	1	0	5	4	13	−9	3 (Note: Goal difference in all group matches: Vorskla Poltava –9, Qarabağ –11.)		0–3	1–2	—	0–1
4	(Azerbaijan) Qarabağ	6	1	0	5	2	13	−11	3		0–3	1–6	0–1	—

Source: UEFA
Rules for classification: Group stage tiebreakers
Notes:
20 September 2018
21:00 (20:00 UTC+1)

Sporting CP (Portugal)	2–0	(Azerbaijan) Qarabağ
Raphinha 54'; Cabral 88'	Report

Estádio José Alvalade, Lisbon
Attendance: 30,098
Referee: François Letexier (France)
20 September 2018
21:00 (20:00 UTC+1)

Arsenal (England)	4–2	(Ukraine) Vorskla Poltava
Aubameyang 32', 56'; Welbeck 48'; Özil 74'	Report	Chesnakov 77'; Sharpar 90+3'

Emirates Stadium, London
Attendance: 59,039
Referee: Bart Vertenten (Belgium)

4 October 2018
18:55 (19:55 UTC+3)

Vorskla Poltava (Ukraine)	1–2	(Portugal) Sporting CP
Kulach 10'	Report	Montero 90+1'; Cabral 90+3'

Oleksiy Butovsky Vorskla Stadium, Poltava
Attendance: 10,082
Referee: Nikola Dabanović (Montenegro)
4 October 2018
18:55 (20:55 UTC+4)

Qarabağ (Azerbaijan)	0–3	(England) Arsenal
	Report	Papastathopoulos 4'; Smith Rowe 53'; Guendouzi 80'

Olympic Stadium, Baku (Note: Qarabağ played their home matches at Olympic Stadium, Baku, instead of their regular stadium Azersun Arena, Baku.)
Attendance: 63,412
Referee: Davide Massa (Italy)

25 October 2018
18:55 (20:55 UTC+4)

Qarabağ (Azerbaijan)	0–1	(Ukraine) Vorskla Poltava
	Report	Kulach 48'

Olympic Stadium, Baku
Attendance: 22,450
Referee: Roi Reinshreiber (Israel)
25 October 2018
18:55 (17:55 UTC+1)

Sporting CP (Portugal)	0–1	(England) Arsenal
	Report	Welbeck 78'

Estádio José Alvalade, Lisbon
Attendance: 40,784
Referee: Damir Skomina (Slovenia)

8 November 2018
21:00 (22:00 UTC+2)

Vorskla Poltava (Ukraine)	0–1	(Azerbaijan) Qarabağ
	Report	Abdullayev 13' (pen.)

Oleksiy Butovsky Vorskla Stadium, Poltava
Attendance: 5,479
Referee: Sandro Schärer (Switzerland)
8 November 2018
21:00 (20:00 UTC+0)

Arsenal (England)	0–0	(Portugal) Sporting CP
	Report

Emirates Stadium, London
Attendance: 59,758
Referee: Gediminas Mažeika (Lithuania)

29 November 2018
18:55 (21:55 UTC+4)

Qarabağ (Azerbaijan)	1–6	(Portugal) Sporting CP
Zoubir 14'	Report	Dost 5' (pen.); Fernandes 20', 75'; Nani 33'; Diaby 65', 82'

Olympic Stadium, Baku
Attendance: 5,416
Referee: Petr Ardeleánu (Czech Republic)
29 November 2018
18:55 (19:55 UTC+2)

Vorskla Poltava (Ukraine)	0–3	(England) Arsenal
	Report	Smith Rowe 11'; Ramsey 27' (pen.); Willock 41'

NSC Olimpiyskiy, Kyiv (Note: Vorskla Poltava played this match at NSC Olimpiyskiy, Kyiv, instead of their regular stadium Oleksiy Butovsky Vorskla Stadium, Poltava, due to martial law being declared in parts of Ukraine.)
Attendance: 7,751
Referee: Bartosz Frankowski (Poland)

13 December 2018
21:00 (20:00 UTC+0)

Sporting CP (Portugal)	3–0	(Ukraine) Vorskla Poltava
Montero 17'; Miguel Luís 35'; Dallku 44' (o.g.)	Report

Estádio José Alvalade, Lisbon
Attendance: 25,504
Referee: Manuel Schüttengruber (Austria)
13 December 2018
21:00 (20:00 UTC+0)

Arsenal (England)	1–0	(Azerbaijan) Qarabağ
Lacazette 17'	Report

Emirates Stadium, London
Attendance: 58,101
Referee: Jens Maae (Denmark)

=== Group F ===
Pos	Team	Pld	W	D	L	GF	GA	GD	Pts	Qualification	BET	OLY	MIL	DUD
1	(Spain) Real Betis	6	3	3	0	7	2	+5	12	Advance to knockout phase	—	1–0	1–1	3–0
2	(Greece) Olympiacos	6	3	1	2	11	6	+5	10 (Note: Goal difference in all group matches: Olympiacos +5, Milan +3.)	Advance to knockout phase	0–0	—	3–1	5–1
3	(Italy) Milan	6	3	1	2	12	9	+3	10		1–2	3–1	—	5–2
4	(Luxembourg) F91 Dudelange	6	0	1	5	3	16	−13	1		0–0	0–2	0–1	—

Source: UEFA
Rules for classification: Group stage tiebreakers
Notes:
20 September 2018
21:00

F91 Dudelange (Luxembourg)	0–1	(Italy) Milan
	Report	Higuaín 59'

Stade Josy Barthel, Luxembourg City (Note: F91 Dudelange played their home matches at Stade Josy Barthel, Luxembourg City, instead of their regular stadium Stade Jos Nosbaum, Dudelange.)
Attendance: 7,983
Referee: Srđan Jovanović (Serbia)
20 September 2018
21:00 (22:00 UTC+3)

Olympiacos (Greece)	0–0	(Spain) Real Betis
	Report

Karaiskakis Stadium, Piraeus
Attendance: 28,650
Referee: Daniel Stefański (Poland)

4 October 2018
18:55

Real Betis (Spain)	3–0	(Luxembourg) F91 Dudelange
Sanabria 56'; Lo Celso 80'; Tello 88'	Report

Estadio Benito Villamarín, Seville
Attendance: 40,133
Referee: Andrew Dallas (Scotland)
4 October 2018
18:55

Milan (Italy)	3–1	(Greece) Olympiacos
Cutrone 70', 79'; Higuaín 76'	Report	Guerrero 14'

Stadio San Siro, Milan
Attendance: 22,294
Referee: Bobby Madden (Scotland)

25 October 2018
18:55

Milan (Italy)	1–2	(Spain) Real Betis
Cutrone 83'	Report	Sanabria 30'; Lo Celso 55'

Stadio San Siro, Milan
Attendance: 22,405
Referee: Bas Nijhuis (Netherlands)
25 October 2018
18:55

F91 Dudelange (Luxembourg)	0–2	(Greece) Olympiacos
	Report	Torosidis 66'; Jordanov 81' (o.g.)

Stade Josy Barthel, Luxembourg City
Attendance: 7,500
Referee: Hüseyin Göçek (Turkey)

8 November 2018
21:00

Real Betis (Spain)	1–1	(Italy) Milan
Lo Celso 12'	Report	Suso 62'

Estadio Benito Villamarín, Seville
Attendance: 45,647
Referee: Craig Pawson (England)
8 November 2018
21:00 (22:00 UTC+2)

Olympiacos (Greece)	5–1	(Luxembourg) F91 Dudelange
Torosidis 6'; Fortounis 15', 36'; Christodoulopoulos 26'; Hassan 71'	Report	Sinani 69'

Karaiskakis Stadium, Piraeus
Attendance: 24,032
Referee: Petr Ardeleánu (Czech Republic)

29 November 2018
18:55

Milan (Italy)	5–2	(Luxembourg) F91 Dudelange
Cutrone 21'; Stélvio 66' (o.g.); Çalhanoğlu 70'; Schnell 77' (o.g.); Borini 80'	Report	Stolz 39'; Turpel 49'

Stadio San Siro, Milan
Attendance: 15,521
Referee: Vladislav Bezborodov (Russia)
29 November 2018
18:55

Real Betis (Spain)	1–0	(Greece) Olympiacos
Canales 39'	Report

Estadio Benito Villamarín, Seville
Attendance: 37,722
Referee: Sergei Karasev (Russia)

13 December 2018
21:00

F91 Dudelange (Luxembourg)	0–0	(Spain) Real Betis
	Report

Stade Josy Barthel, Luxembourg City
Attendance: 4,931
Referee: Peter Kralovič (Slovakia)
13 December 2018
21:00 (22:00 UTC+2)

Olympiacos (Greece)	3–1	(Italy) Milan
Cissé 60'; Zapata 70' (o.g.); Fortounis 81' (pen.)	Report	Zapata 72'

Karaiskakis Stadium, Piraeus
Attendance: 31,010
Referee: Benoît Bastien (France)

=== Group G ===
Pos	Team	Pld	W	D	L	GF	GA	GD	Pts	Qualification	VIL	RW	RAN	SPM
1	(Spain) Villarreal	6	2	4	0	12	5	+7	10 (Note: Head-to-head points: Villarreal 4, Rapid Wien 1.)	Advance to knockout phase	—	5–0	2–2	2–0
2	(Austria) Rapid Wien	6	3	1	2	6	9	−3	10	Advance to knockout phase	0–0	—	1–0	2–0
3	(Scotland) Rangers	6	1	3	2	8	8	0	6		0–0	3–1	—	0–0
4	(Russia) Spartak Moscow	6	1	2	3	8	12	−4	5		3–3	1–2	4–3	—

Source: UEFA
Rules for classification: Group stage tiebreakers
Notes:
20 September 2018
18:55

Villarreal (Spain)	2–2	(Scotland) Rangers
Bacca 1'; Gerard 69'	Report	Arfield 67'; Lafferty 76'

Estadio de la Cerámica, Villarreal
Attendance: 15,982
Referee: István Kovács (Romania)
20 September 2018
18:55

Rapid Wien (Austria)	2–0	(Russia) Spartak Moscow
Timofeyev 50' (o.g.); Murg 68'	Report

Allianz Stadion, Vienna
Attendance: 21,400
Referee: Alain Bieri (Switzerland)

4 October 2018
21:00 (22:00 UTC+3)

Spartak Moscow (Russia)	3–3	(Spain) Villarreal
Zé Luís 34' (pen.), 82'; Melgarejo 85'	Report	Toko Ekambi 13'; Fornals 49'; Cazorla 90+6' (pen.)

Otkritie Arena, Moscow
Attendance: 21,264
Referee: Daniel Siebert (Germany)
4 October 2018
21:00 (20:00 UTC+1)

Rangers (Scotland)	3–1	(Austria) Rapid Wien
Morelos 44', 90+4'; Tavernier 84' (pen.)	Report	Berisha 42'

Ibrox Stadium, Glasgow
Attendance: 47,534
Referee: Ruddy Buquet (France)

25 October 2018
21:00 (20:00 UTC+1)

Rangers (Scotland)	0–0	(Russia) Spartak Moscow
	Report

Ibrox Stadium, Glasgow
Attendance: 49,068
Referee: Kevin Blom (Netherlands)
25 October 2018
21:00

Villarreal (Spain)	5–0	(Austria) Rapid Wien
Fornals 26'; Toko Ekambi 30'; Barać 45' (o.g.); Raba 63'; Gerard 85'	Report

Estadio de la Cerámica, Villarreal
Attendance: 14,158
Referee: Halis Özkahya (Turkey)

8 November 2018
18:55 (20:55 UTC+3)

Spartak Moscow (Russia)	4–3	(Scotland) Rangers
Melgarejo 22'; Goldson 35' (o.g.); Luiz Adriano 58'; Hanni 59'	Report	Eremenko 5' (o.g.); Candeias 27'; Middleton 41'

Otkritie Arena, Moscow
Attendance: 22,296
Referee: Ivan Bebek (Croatia)
8 November 2018
18:55

Rapid Wien (Austria)	0–0	(Spain) Villarreal
	Report

Allianz Stadion, Vienna
Attendance: 22,100
Referee: Srđan Jovanović (Serbia)

29 November 2018
16:50 (18:50 UTC+3)

Spartak Moscow (Russia)	1–2	(Austria) Rapid Wien
Zé Luís 20'	Report	Müldür 80'; Schobesberger 90+1'

Otkritie Arena, Moscow
Attendance: 20,739
Referee: Paweł Gil (Poland)
29 November 2018
21:00 (20:00 UTC+0)

Rangers (Scotland)	0–0	(Spain) Villarreal
	Report

Ibrox Stadium, Glasgow
Attendance: 50,171
Referee: Matej Jug (Slovenia)

13 December 2018
18:55

Villarreal (Spain)	2–0	(Russia) Spartak Moscow
Chukwueze 11'; Toko Ekambi 48'	Report

Estadio de la Cerámica, Villarreal
Attendance: 12,903
Referee: Andris Treimanis (Latvia)
13 December 2018
18:55

Rapid Wien (Austria)	1–0	(Scotland) Rangers
Ljubičić 84'	Report

Allianz Stadion, Vienna
Attendance: 23,850
Referee: Paolo Mazzoleni (Italy)

=== Group H ===
Pos	Team	Pld	W	D	L	GF	GA	GD	Pts	Qualification	FRA	LAZ	APL	MAR
1	(Germany) Eintracht Frankfurt	6	6	0	0	17	5	+12	18	Advance to knockout phase	—	4–1	2–0	4–0
2	(Italy) Lazio	6	3	0	3	9	11	−2	9	Advance to knockout phase	1–2	—	2–1	2–1
3	(Cyprus) Apollon Limassol	6	2	1	3	10	10	0	7		2–3	2–0	—	2–2
4	(France) Marseille	6	0	1	5	6	16	−10	1		1–2	1–3	1–3	—

Source: UEFA
Rules for classification: Group stage tiebreakers
20 September 2018
18:55

Marseille (France)	1–2	(Germany) Eintracht Frankfurt
Ocampos 3'	Report	Torró 52'; Jović 89'

Stade Vélodrome, Marseille
Attendance: 0 (Note: The Marseille v Eintracht Frankfurt match was played behind closed doors as punishment for the behaviour of Marseille's fans.)
Referee: Matej Jug (Slovenia)
20 September 2018
18:55

Lazio (Italy)	2–1	(Cyprus) Apollon Limassol
Luis Alberto 14'; Immobile 84' (pen.)	Report	Zelaya 87'

Stadio Olimpico, Rome
Attendance: 11,898
Referee: Aliyar Aghayev (Azerbaijan)

4 October 2018
21:00 (22:00 UTC+3)

Apollon Limassol (Cyprus)	2–2	(France) Marseille
Marković 74'; Zelaya 90'	Report	Payet 50'; Luiz Gustavo 67'

GSP Stadium, Nicosia (Note: Apollon Limassol played their home matches at GSP Stadium, Nicosia, instead of their regular stadium Tsirio Stadium, Limassol.)
Attendance: 3,031
Referee: Harald Lechner (Austria)
4 October 2018
21:00

Eintracht Frankfurt (Germany)	4–1	(Italy) Lazio
Da Costa 4', 90+4'; Kostić 28'; Jović 52'	Report	Parolo 23'

Waldstadion, Frankfurt
Attendance: 47,000
Referee: Serdar Gözübüyük (Netherlands)

25 October 2018
21:00

Eintracht Frankfurt (Germany)	2–0	(Cyprus) Apollon Limassol
Kostić 13'; Haller 32'	Report

Waldstadion, Frankfurt
Attendance: 47,000
Referee: Sergey Ivanov (Russia)
25 October 2018
21:00

Marseille (France)	1–3	(Italy) Lazio
Payet 86'	Report	Wallace 10'; Caicedo 59'; Marušić 90'

Stade Vélodrome, Marseille
Attendance: 31,930
Referee: Jesús Gil Manzano (Spain)

8 November 2018
18:55 (19:55 UTC+2)

Apollon Limassol (Cyprus)	2–3	(Germany) Eintracht Frankfurt
Zelaya 71', 90+4' (pen.)	Report	Jović 17'; Haller 55'; Gaćinović 58'

GSP Stadium, Nicosia
Attendance: 6,888
Referee: Tiago Martins (Portugal)
8 November 2018
18:55

Lazio (Italy)	2–1	(France) Marseille
Parolo 45+1'; Correa 55'	Report	Thauvin 60'

Stadio Olimpico, Rome
Attendance: 14,705
Referee: Vladislav Bezborodov (Russia)

29 November 2018
21:00

Eintracht Frankfurt (Germany)	4–0	(France) Marseille
Jović 2', 67'; Luiz Gustavo 17' (o.g.); Sarr 62' (o.g.)	Report

Waldstadion, Frankfurt
Attendance: 47,000
Referee: John Beaton (Scotland)
29 November 2018
21:00 (22:00 UTC+2)

Apollon Limassol (Cyprus)	2–0	(Italy) Lazio
Faupala 31'; Marković 82'	Report

GSP Stadium, Nicosia
Attendance: 1,131
Referee: Roi Reinshreiber (Israel)

13 December 2018
18:55

Marseille (France)	1–3	(Cyprus) Apollon Limassol
Thauvin 11'	Report	Maglica 8' (pen.), 30'; Stylianou 56'

Stade Vélodrome, Marseille
Attendance: 9,274
Referee: Radu Petrescu (Romania)
13 December 2018
18:55

Lazio (Italy)	1–2	(Germany) Eintracht Frankfurt
Correa 56'	Report	Gaćinović 65'; Haller 71'

Stadio Olimpico, Rome
Attendance: 18,252
Referee: Halil Umut Meler (Turkey)

=== Group I ===
Pos	Team	Pld	W	D	L	GF	GA	GD	Pts	Qualification	GNK	MAL	BES	SRP
1	(Belgium) Genk	6	3	2	1	14	8	+6	11	Advance to knockout phase	—	2–0	1–1	4–0
2	(Sweden) Malmö FF	6	2	3	1	7	6	+1	9	Advance to knockout phase	2–2	—	2–0	1–1
3	(Turkey) Beşiktaş	6	2	1	3	9	11	−2	7		2–4	0–1	—	3–1
4	(Norway) Sarpsborg 08	6	1	2	3	8	13	−5	5		3–1	1–1	2–3	—

Source: UEFA
Rules for classification: Group stage tiebreakers
20 September 2018
18:55 (19:55 UTC+3)

Beşiktaş (Turkey)	3–1	(Norway) Sarpsborg 08
Babel 51'; Roco 69'; Lens 82'	Report	Zachariassen 90+4'

Vodafone Park, Istanbul
Attendance: 24,955
Referee: Tamás Bognár (Hungary)
20 September 2018
18:55

Genk (Belgium)	2–0	(Sweden) Malmö FF
Trossard 37'; Samatta 71'	Report

Luminus Arena, Genk
Attendance: 11,590
Referee: Aleksei Eskov (Russia)

4 October 2018
21:00

Malmö FF (Sweden)	2–0	(Turkey) Beşiktaş
Erkin 53' (o.g.); Rosenberg 76' (pen.)	Report

Stadion, Malmö
Attendance: 17,174
Referee: Aleksandar Stavrev (Macedonia)
4 October 2018
21:00

Sarpsborg 08 (Norway)	3–1	(Belgium) Genk
Mortensen 6', 63'; Zachariassen 54'	Report	Trossard 49'

Sarpsborg Stadion, Sarpsborg
Attendance: 7,885
Referee: Ivan Bebek (Croatia)

25 October 2018
21:00

Sarpsborg 08 (Norway)	1–1	(Sweden) Malmö FF
Halvorsen 87'	Report	Vindheim 79'

Sarpsborg Stadion, Sarpsborg
Attendance: 8,022
Referee: Paweł Raczkowski (Poland)
25 October 2018
21:00 (22:00 UTC+3)

Beşiktaş (Turkey)	2–4	(Belgium) Genk
Vágner Love 74', 86'	Report	Samatta 23', 70'; Ndongala 81'; Piotrowski 83'

Vodafone Park, Istanbul
Attendance: 25,209
Referee: Daniel Stefański (Poland)

8 November 2018
18:55

Malmö FF (Sweden)	1–1	(Norway) Sarpsborg 08
Antonsson 67'	Report	Mortensen 63'

Stadion, Malmö
Attendance: 17,601
Referee: Miroslav Zelinka (Czech Republic)
8 November 2018
18:55

Genk (Belgium)	1–1	(Turkey) Beşiktaş
Berge 87'	Report	Quaresma 16'

Luminus Arena, Genk
Attendance: 14,292
Referee: Tobias Stieler (Germany)

29 November 2018
21:00

Sarpsborg 08 (Norway)	2–3	(Turkey) Beşiktaş
Muhammed 1'; Heintz 6'	Report	Lens 62', 90'; Vágner Love 66'

Sarpsborg Stadion, Sarpsborg
Attendance: 8,022
Referee: Harald Lechner (Austria)
29 November 2018
21:00

Malmö FF (Sweden)	2–2	(Belgium) Genk
Lewicki 65'; Antonsson 67'	Report	Pozuelo 42'; Paintsil 53'

Stadion, Malmö
Attendance: 16,117
Referee: Srđan Jovanović (Serbia)

13 December 2018
18:55 (20:55 UTC+3)

Beşiktaş (Turkey)	0–1	(Sweden) Malmö FF
	Report	Antonsson 51'

Vodafone Park, Istanbul
Attendance: 24,955
Referee: Luca Banti (Italy)
13 December 2018
18:55

Genk (Belgium)	4–0	(Norway) Sarpsborg 08
Gano 3'; Paintsil 5'; Berge 64'; Aidoo 67'	Report

Luminus Arena, Genk
Attendance: 12,240
Referee: István Kovács (Romania)

=== Group J ===
Pos	Team	Pld	W	D	L	GF	GA	GD	Pts	Qualification	SEV	KRA	STL	AKH
1	(Spain) Sevilla	6	4	0	2	18	6	+12	12 (Note: Head-to-head goal difference: Sevilla +2, Krasnodar –2.)	Advance to knockout phase	—	3–0	5–1	6–0
2	(Russia) Krasnodar	6	4	0	2	8	8	0	12	Advance to knockout phase	2–1	—	2–1	2–1
3	(Belgium) Standard Liège	6	3	1	2	7	9	−2	10		1–0	2–1	—	2–1
4	(Turkey) Akhisarspor	6	0	1	5	4	14	−10	1		2–3	0–1	0–0	—

Source: UEFA
Rules for classification: Group stage tiebreakers
Notes:
20 September 2018
18:55

Sevilla (Spain)	5–1	(Belgium) Standard Liège
Banega 8', 74' (pen.); Vázquez 41'; Ben Yedder 49', 70'	Report	Djenepo 39'

Estadio Ramón Sánchez Pizjuán, Seville
Attendance: 30,003
Referee: Gediminas Mažeika (Lithuania)
20 September 2018
18:55 (19:55 UTC+3)

Akhisarspor (Turkey)	0–1	(Russia) Krasnodar
	Report	Claesson 26'

Spor Toto Akhisar Stadium, Akhisar
Attendance: 6,555
Referee: Ville Nevalainen (Finland)

4 October 2018
21:00 (22:00 UTC+3)

Krasnodar (Russia)	2–1	(Spain) Sevilla
Pereyra 72'; Okriashvili 88'	Report	Kaboré 43' (o.g.)

Krasnodar Stadium, Krasnodar
Attendance: 31,346
Referee: Martin Strömbergsson (Sweden)
4 October 2018
21:00

Standard Liège (Belgium)	2–1	(Turkey) Akhisarspor
Emond 17'; Djenepo 40'	Report	Ayık 32'

Stade Maurice Dufrasne, Liège
Attendance: 8,233
Referee: Manuel Schüttengruber (Austria)

25 October 2018
21:00

Standard Liège (Belgium)	2–1	(Russia) Krasnodar
Emond 47'; Laifis 90+3'	Report	Ari 39'

Stade Maurice Dufrasne, Liège
Attendance: 8,393
Referee: Marco Guida (Italy)
25 October 2018
21:00

Sevilla (Spain)	6–0	(Turkey) Akhisarspor
Mesa 7'; Sarabia 9' (pen.); Lukač 35' (o.g.); Muriel 50'; Promes 60'; Mercado 67'	Report

Estadio Ramón Sánchez Pizjuán, Seville
Attendance: 29,720
Referee: Kevin Clancy (Scotland)

8 November 2018
18:55 (20:55 UTC+3)

Krasnodar (Russia)	2–1	(Belgium) Standard Liège
Suleymanov 79'; Wanderson 82'	Report	Carcela 19'

Krasnodar Stadium, Krasnodar
Attendance: 21,526
Referee: Aleksandar Stavrev (Macedonia)
8 November 2018
18:55 (20:55 UTC+3)

Akhisarspor (Turkey)	2–3	(Spain) Sevilla
Manu 52'; Ayık 78'	Report	Nolito 12'; Muriel 38'; Banega 87' (pen.)

Spor Toto Akhisar Stadium, Akhisar
Attendance: 6,430
Referee: Benoît Millot (France)

29 November 2018
18:55 (20:55 UTC+3)

Krasnodar (Russia)	2–1	(Turkey) Akhisarspor
Gazinsky 49'; Ari 57'	Report	Serginho 24'

Krasnodar Stadium, Krasnodar
Attendance: 11,008
Referee: Ivaylo Stoyanov (Bulgaria)
29 November 2018
21:00

Standard Liège (Belgium)	1–0	(Spain) Sevilla
Djenepo 62'	Report

Stade Maurice Dufrasne, Liège
Attendance: 12,882
Referee: Daniel Siebert (Germany)

13 December 2018
18:55

Sevilla (Spain)	3–0	(Russia) Krasnodar
Ben Yedder 5', 10'; Banega 49' (pen.)	Report

Estadio Ramón Sánchez Pizjuán, Seville
Attendance: 34,114
Referee: Daniel Stefański (Poland)
13 December 2018
18:55 (20:55 UTC+3)

Akhisarspor (Turkey)	0–0	(Belgium) Standard Liège
	Report

Spor Toto Akhisar Stadium, Akhisar
Attendance: 2,674
Referee: Ádám Farkas (Hungary)

=== Group K ===
Pos	Team	Pld	W	D	L	GF	GA	GD	Pts	Qualification	DKV	REN	AST	JAB
1	(Ukraine) Dynamo Kyiv	6	3	2	1	10	7	+3	11	Advance to knockout phase	—	3–1	2–2	0–1
2	(France) Rennes	6	3	0	3	7	8	−1	9	Advance to knockout phase	1–2	—	2–0	2–1
3	(Kazakhstan) Astana	6	2	2	2	7	7	0	8		0–1	2–0	—	2–1
4	(Czech Republic) Jablonec	6	1	2	3	6	8	−2	5		2–2	0–1	1–1	—

Source: UEFA
Rules for classification: Group stage tiebreakers
20 September 2018
18:55

Rennes (France)	2–1	(Czech Republic) Jablonec
Sarr 31'; Ben Arfa 90+1' (pen.)	Report	Trávník 54'

Roazhon Park, Rennes
Attendance: 20,628
Referee: Ole Hobber Nilsen (Norway)
20 September 2018
18:55 (19:55 UTC+3)

Dynamo Kyiv (Ukraine)	2–2	(Kazakhstan) Astana
Tsyhankov 11'; Harmash 45+1'	Report	Aničić 21'; Murtazayev 90+5'

NSC Olimpiyskiy, Kyiv
Attendance: 21,783
Referee: Halis Özkahya (Turkey)

4 October 2018
16:50 (20:50 UTC+6)

Astana (Kazakhstan)	2–0	(France) Rennes
Zaynutdinov 64'; Tomasov 90+1'	Report

Astana Arena, Astana
Attendance: 25,302
Referee: Mattias Gestranius (Finland)
4 October 2018
21:00

Jablonec (Czech Republic)	2–2	(Ukraine) Dynamo Kyiv
Hovorka 33'; Trávník 81'	Report	Tsyhankov 8'; Harmash 14'

Stadion Střelnice, Jablonec nad Nisou
Attendance: 5,077
Referee: Sébastien Delferière (Belgium)

25 October 2018
21:00

Jablonec (Czech Republic)	1–1	(Kazakhstan) Astana
Považanec 4'	Report	Pedro Henrique 11'

Stadion Střelnice, Jablonec nad Nisou
Attendance: 4,909
Referee: Robert Schörgenhofer (Austria)
25 October 2018
21:00

Rennes (France)	1–2	(Ukraine) Dynamo Kyiv
Grenier 41'	Report	Kędziora 21'; Buyalskyi 89'

Roazhon Park, Rennes
Attendance: 28,001
Referee: Tamás Bognár (Hungary)

8 November 2018
16:50 (21:50 UTC+6)

Astana (Kazakhstan)	2–1	(Czech Republic) Jablonec
Pedro Henrique 18'; Postnikov 88'	Report	Zaynutdinov 41' (o.g.)

Astana Arena, Astana
Attendance: 20,092
Referee: István Vad (Hungary)
8 November 2018
18:55 (19:55 UTC+2)

Dynamo Kyiv (Ukraine)	3–1	(France) Rennes
Verbič 13'; Mykolenko 68'; Shaparenko 72'	Report	Siebatcheu 89'

NSC Olimpiyskiy, Kyiv
Attendance: 24,402
Referee: John Beaton (Scotland)

29 November 2018
16:50 (21:50 UTC+6)

Astana (Kazakhstan)	0–1	(Ukraine) Dynamo Kyiv
	Report	Verbič 29'

Astana Arena, Astana
Attendance: 26,508
Referee: Ivan Bebek (Croatia)
29 November 2018
21:00

Jablonec (Czech Republic)	0–1	(France) Rennes
	Report	Grenier 55'

Stadion Střelnice, Jablonec nad Nisou
Attendance: 4,712
Referee: Tiago Martins (Portugal)

13 December 2018
18:55

Rennes (France)	2–0	(Kazakhstan) Astana
Sarr 68', 73'	Report

Roazhon Park, Rennes
Attendance: 24,535
Referee: Serdar Gözübüyük (Netherlands)
13 December 2018
18:55 (19:55 UTC+2)

Dynamo Kyiv (Ukraine)	0–1	(Czech Republic) Jablonec
	Report	Doležal 10'

NSC Olimpiyskiy, Kyiv
Attendance: 11,300
Referee: Vilhjálmur Thórarinsson (Iceland)

=== Group L ===
Pos	Team	Pld	W	D	L	GF	GA	GD	Pts	Qualification	CHL	BATE	VID	PAOK
1	(England) Chelsea	6	5	1	0	12	3	+9	16	Advance to knockout phase	—	3–1	1–0	4–0
2	(Belarus) BATE Borisov	6	3	0	3	9	9	0	9	Advance to knockout phase	0–1	—	2–0	1–4
3	(Hungary) Vidi	6	2	1	3	5	7	−2	7		2–2	0–2	—	1–0
4	(Greece) PAOK	6	1	0	5	5	12	−7	3		0–1	1–3	0–2	—

Source: UEFA
Rules for classification: Group stage tiebreakers
20 September 2018
18:55 (19:55 UTC+3)

PAOK (Greece)	0–1	(England) Chelsea
	Report	Willian 7'

Toumba Stadium, Thessaloniki
Attendance: 24,310
Referee: Alberto Undiano Mallenco (Spain)
20 September 2018
18:55

Vidi (Hungary)	0–2	(Belarus) BATE Borisov
	Report	Tuominen 27'; Filipenka 85'

Groupama Arena, Budapest (Note: Vidi played their home matches at Groupama Arena, Budapest, due to delays with the construction of their new stadium Sóstói Stadion, Székesfehérvár.)
Attendance: 14,726
Referee: Mads-Kristoffer Kristoffersen (Denmark)

4 October 2018
21:00 (22:00 UTC+3)

BATE Borisov (Belarus)	1–4	(Greece) PAOK
Crespo 61' (o.g.)	Report	Prijović 6'; Léo Jabá 11', 17'; Pelkas 73'

Borisov Arena, Barysaw
Attendance: 10,527
Referee: Robert Schörgenhofer (Austria)
4 October 2018
21:00 (20:00 UTC+1)

Chelsea (England)	1–0	(Hungary) Vidi
Morata 70'	Report

Stamford Bridge, London
Attendance: 39,925
Referee: Miroslav Zelinka (Czech Republic)

25 October 2018
21:00 (20:00 UTC+1)

Chelsea (England)	3–1	(Belarus) BATE Borisov
Loftus-Cheek 2', 8', 54'	Report	Ryas 80'

Stamford Bridge, London
Attendance: 39,799
Referee: Paolo Mazzoleni (Italy)
25 October 2018
21:00 (22:00 UTC+3)

PAOK (Greece)	0–2	(Hungary) Vidi
	Report	Huszti 12'; Stopira 45'

Toumba Stadium, Thessaloniki
Attendance: 15,118
Referee: Yevhen Aranovskyi (Ukraine)

8 November 2018
18:55 (20:55 UTC+3)

BATE Borisov (Belarus)	0–1	(England) Chelsea
	Report	Giroud 53'

Borisov Arena, Barysaw
Attendance: 13,141
Referee: Nikola Dabanović (Montenegro)
8 November 2018
18:55

Vidi (Hungary)	1–0	(Greece) PAOK
Milanov 50'	Report

Groupama Arena, Budapest
Attendance: 17,208
Referee: Ali Palabıyık (Turkey)

29 November 2018
18:55 (20:55 UTC+3)

BATE Borisov (Belarus)	2–0	(Hungary) Vidi
Signevich 22'; Ivanić 85'	Report

Borisov Arena, Barysaw
Attendance: 8,963
Referee: Carlos del Cerro Grande (Spain)
29 November 2018
21:00 (20:00 UTC+0)

Chelsea (England)	4–0	(Greece) PAOK
Giroud 27', 37'; Hudson-Odoi 60'; Morata 78'	Report

Stamford Bridge, London
Attendance: 33,933
Referee: Kristo Tohver (Estonia)

13 December 2018
18:55 (19:55 UTC+2)

PAOK (Greece)	1–3	(Belarus) BATE Borisov
Prijović 59'	Report	Skavysh 18'; Signevich 42' (pen.), 45+1'

Toumba Stadium, Thessaloniki
Attendance: 13,483
Referee: Tobias Welz (Germany)
13 December 2018
18:55

Vidi (Hungary)	2–2	(England) Chelsea
Ampadu 32' (o.g.); Négo 56'	Report	Willian 30'; Giroud 75'

Groupama Arena, Budapest
Attendance: 19,242
Referee: Aleksandar Stavrev (Macedonia)
