= 2016–17 Akhisarspor season =

Akhisarspor
2016–17 season
- President: Hüseyin Eryüksel
- Manager: Cihat Arslan (until 1 September 2016); Tolunay Kafkas (6 September 2016 – 18 March 2017); Okan Buruk (from 23 March 2017)
- Stadium: Manisa 19 Mayıs Stadium
- Süper Lig: 7th
- Cup: Quarter-final
- Top goalscorer: League: Ricardo Vaz Tê (11); All: Ricardo Vaz Tê (25)
Home colours	Away colours	Third colours

The 2016–17 season was Akhisarspor's 5th consecutive season in the Süper Lig.

== Squad ==
Players who made at least one appearance in the league or cup during the season.

Note: Flags indicate national team as defined under FIFA eligibility rules; some limited exceptions apply. Players may hold more than one non-FIFA nationality.

No.	Pos.	Nation	Player
1	GK	SRB	Milan Lukač
2	DF	BRA	Douglão
5	MF	TUR	Özer Hurmacı
6	MF	TUR	Aykut Çeviker
7	FW	TUR	Muğdat Çelik
8	MF	TUR	Abdulkadir Özdemir
9	FW	POR	Ricardo Vaz Tê
10	MF	TUR	Soner Aydoğdu
11	FW	TUR	Onur Ayık
12	FW	SWE	Daniel Larsson
13	DF	POR	Miguel Lopes
14	DF	GER	Tolga Ünlü
15	DF	TUR	Orhan Taşdelen
16	MF	TUR	Hasan Ali Adıgüzel
17	FW	GNB	Leocísio Sami
18	MF	GHA	Enoch Kofi Adu
19	DF	TUR	Ömer Bayram
20	MF	MLI	Abdoul Sissoko
21	MF	CMR	Landry N'Guémo

No.	Pos.	Nation	Player
22	DF	TUR	Mustafa Yumlu
23	FW	COL	Hugo Rodallega
25	MF	TUR	Alper Uludağ
26	GK	FRA	Fatih Öztürk
27	MF	POR	Custódio
28	DF	SVN	Miral Samardžić
29	MF	TUR	Olcan Adın
30	FW	COD	Jeremy Bokila
35	GK	TUR	Bora Körk
37	FW	ALB	Sokol Cikalleshi
53	DF	TUR	Serdar Kesimal
88	DF	TUR	Caner Osmanpaşa
89	DF	TUR	Kadir Keleş
90	MF	SWE	Mervan Çelik
95	DF	TUR	Safa Memnun
96	GK	TUR	Berker Öncü
99	FW	TUR	Bertuğ Bayar
—	DF	TUR	Onur Akdeniz

== Competitions ==
=== Süper Lig ===
==== Table ====
Pos	Team	Pld	W	D	L	GF	GA	GD	Pts	Qualification or relegation
5	Antalyaspor	34	17	7	10	47	40	+7	58	
6	Trabzonspor	34	14	9	11	39	34	+5	51	
7	Akhisar Belediyespor	34	14	6	14	46	42	+4	48	
8	Gençlerbirliği	34	12	10	12	33	34	−1	46	
9	Konyaspor	34	11	10	13	40	45	−5	43 (Note: Konyaspor ahead of Kasımpaşa and Kardemir Karabükspor on head-to-head points: Konyaspor 8 pts, Kasımpaşa 3 pts, Kardemir Karabükspor 3 pts. Kasımpaşa ahead of Kardemir Karabükspor on head-to-head goal difference.)	Qualification for the Europa League group stage (Note: Konyaspor qualified for the Europa League group stage by winning the 2016–17 Turkish Cup.)

Source: Süper Lig, Soccerway
Rules for classification: 1) Points; 2) Head-to-head points; 3) Head-to-head goal difference; 4) Head-to-head goals scored; 5) Goal difference; 6) Goals scored; 7) Play-off.

==== Results summary ====
Overall								Home						Away					
Pld	W	D	L	GF	GA	GD	Pts	W	D	L	GF	GA	GD	W	D	L	GF	GA	GD
34	14	6	14	46	42	+4	48	9	2	6	29	18	+11	5	4	8	17	24	−7

Last updated: 15 October 2017.
Source: WhoScored

==== Results by round ====
Round	1	2	3	4	5	6	7	8	9	10	11	12	13	14	15	16	17	18	19	20	21	22	23	24	25	26	27	28	29	30	31	32	33	34
Ground	A	H	A	H	A	H	A	H	A	H	A	H	A	H	A	H	A	H	A	H	A	H	A	H	A	H	A	H	A	H	A	H	A	H
Result	W	L	L	L	D	D	D	W	L	L	D	W	W	L	D	W	L	D	L	W	L	W	L	L	L	W	L	W	W	W	W	W	W	L
Position	2	7	12	13	14	14	13	11	14	17	16	12	11	13	14	10	13	13	13	13	13	13	13	14	15	14	14	14	12	10	8	7	7	7

Updated to match(es) played on 15 October 2017. Source: WhoScored
A = Away; H = Home; W = Win; D = Draw; L = Loss
