= 2017–18 Akhisarspor season =

Akhisarspor
2017–18 season
- President: Hüseyin Eryüksel
- Manager: Okan Buruk
- Stadium: Manisa 19 Mayıs Stadium (until 17 December 2017); Spor Toto Akhisar Stadium (from 28 January 2018)
- Süper Lig: 11th
- Cup: Winners
- Top goalscorer: League: Soner Aydoğdu (7); All: Yevhen Seleznyov (10)
Home colours	Away colours	Third colours

The 2017–18 season was Akhisarspor's 6th consecutive season in the Süper Lig.

== Squad ==
Players who made at least one appearance in the league or cup during the season.

Note: Flags indicate national team as defined under FIFA eligibility rules; some limited exceptions apply. Players may hold more than one non-FIFA nationality.

No.	Pos.	Nation	Player
1	GK	SRB	Milan Lukač
3	DF	TUR	Alperen Babacan
5	MF	TUR	Eray Ataseven
6	MF	TUR	Aykut Çeviker
7	MF	POR	Hélder Barbosa
8	FW	TUR	Muğdat Çelik
9	FW	ROU	Ioan Hora
10	MF	TUR	Soner Aydoğdu
11	MF	TUR	Onur Ayık
12	FW	BRA	Paulo Henrique
13	DF	POR	Miguel Lopes
15	DF	TUR	Orhan Taşdelen
17	MF	TUR	Hasan Ali Adıgüzel
19	DF	TUR	Ömer Bayram

No.	Pos.	Nation	Player
20	MF	MLI	Abdoul Sissoko
21	FW	UKR	Yevhen Seleznyov
22	DF	TUR	Mustafa Yumlu
24	DF	CMR	Dany Nounkeu
27	MF	TUR	Bilal Kısa
29	MF	TUR	Olcan Adın
31	MF	SWE	Daniel Larsson
35	GK	TUR	Bora Körk
44	FW	NED	Marvin Emnes
63	FW	BEL	Geoffrey Mujangi Bia (on loan from Kayserispor)
77	MF	BRA	Serginho
88	DF	TUR	Caner Osmanpaşa
89	DF	TUR	Kadir Keleş
99	GK	FRA	Fatih Öztürk

== Competitions ==
=== Süper Lig ===
==== Table ====
Pos	Team	Pld	W	D	L	GF	GA	GD	Pts	Qualification or relegation
9	Kayserispor	34	12	8	14	44	55	−11	44	
10	Yeni Malatyaspor	34	11	10	13	38	45	−7	43	
11	Akhisarspor	34	11	9	14	44	53	−9	42	Qualification for the Europa League group stage (Note: Akhisarspor qualified for the Europa League group stage by winning the 2017–18 Turkish Cup.)
12	Alanyaspor	34	11	7	16	55	59	−4	40	
13	Bursaspor	34	11	6	17	43	48	−5	39	

Source: Süper Lig, Soccerway
Rules for classification: 1) Points; 2) Head-to-head points; 3) Head-to-head goal difference; 4) Head-to-head goals scored; 5) Goal difference; 6) Goals scored; 7) Play-off.

==== Results summary ====
Overall								Home						Away					
Pld	W	D	L	GF	GA	GD	Pts	W	D	L	GF	GA	GD	W	D	L	GF	GA	GD
34	11	9	14	44	53	−9	42	7	4	6	20	24	−4	4	5	8	24	29	−5

Last updated: 18 May 2018.
Source: Süper Lig

==== Results by round ====
Round	1	2	3	4	5	6	7	8	9	10	11	12	13	14	15	16	17	18	19	20	21	22	23	24	25	26	27	28	29	30	31	32	33	34
Ground	H	A	H	A	H	A	H	A	H	A	H	A	A	H	A	H	A	A	H	A	H	A	H	A	H	A	H	A	H	H	A	H	A	H
Result	W	D	W	L	W	L	W	W	D	L	L	D	L	D	L	L	L	D	D	L	W	W	W	W	L	D	L	L	L	D	D	L	W	W
Position	6	6	3	8	6	7	6	3	3	6	9	9	11	9	10	12	12	12	13	14	12	12	10	10	10	9	11	11	12	12	12	14	12	11

Updated to match(es) played on 18 May 2018. Source: Süper Lig
A = Away; H = Home; W = Win; D = Draw; L = Loss
