= 2024–25 Austrian Football Second League =

48th season of the Austrian second-level football league

Austrian Football Second League
- Season: 2024–25
- Dates: 2 August 2024 - 25 May 2025
- Champions: SV Guntamatic Ried (3rd title)
- Promoted: SV Guntamatic Ried
- Relegated: SV Horn; Licht-Loidl Lafnitz; ASK Voitsberg
- Matches: 240
- Goals: 708 (2.95 per match)
- Top goalscorer: Claudy M'Buyi (21)
- Biggest home win: Amstetten 5–0 Lafnitz (8 November 2024)
- Biggest away win: Rapid II 0–5 Ried (11 April 2025)
- Highest scoring: Kapfenberger SV 6–4 Lafnitz (4 April 2025)
- Longest winning run: Admira Wacker; Ried (6)
- Longest unbeaten run: Admira Wacker (13)
- Longest winless run: Licht-Loidl Lafnitz (13)
- Longest losing run: Bregenz (8)
- All statistics correct as of 17 May 2025.

The 2024–25 Austrian Football Second League, also known as the Admiral 2nd League for sponsorship purposes, is the 51st season of the Austrian second-level football league and the seventh as the Second League. The league consists of 16 teams.

== Teams ==
Sixteen teams are participating in the 2024–25 season. Despite a fourth-place finish in the 2023-24 Austrian Football Second League, DSV Leoben was not granted admission to the 2nd division in the first and second instance. The club then appealed to the league's permanent neutral arbitration tribunal, where it also failed. As no other club from the Regionalliga West that had applied for a second division license was granted, Ertl Glass Amstetten remained in the league and the number of relegated teams was reduced to two. Mohren Dornbirn also failed to gain admission to the 2nd division and was relegated together with Leoben. ASK Voitsberg was promoted from the Austrian Regionalliga Central and Rapid Wien II was promoted from the Austrian Regionalliga East. Rounding out the league is Austria Lustenau, relegated from the 2023-24 Austrian Football Bundesliga by virtue of their last place finish in the top flight.

Location of teams in the 2024–25 Austrian Football Second League

Club Name	City	Stadium	Capacity
Admira Wacker	Maria Enzersdorf	Datenpol Arena	10,600
SKU Ertl Glas Amstetten	Amstetten	Ertl Glas Stadion	2,000
SC Austria Lustenau	Lustenau	Planet Pure Stadion	5,138
Schwarz-Weiß Bregenz	Bregenz	ImmoAgentur Stadion	12,000
First Vienna FC 1894	Vienna	Hohe Warte Stadium	5,500
FAC WIEN	Vienna	FAC-Platz	3,000
SV Horn	Horn	Sparkasse Horn Arena	7,870
KSV 1919	Kapfenberg	Franz Fekete Stadium	10,000
SV Licht-Loidl Lafnitz	Lafnitz	Sportplatz Lafnitz	3,000
FC Liefering	Salzburg	Untersberg-Arena	4,128
SK Rapid II	Vienna	Allianz Stadion	28,345
SV Guntamatic Ried	Ried im Innkreis	Josko Arena	7,680
Sturm Graz II	Graz	Merkur Arena	16,364
SKN St. Pölten	Sankt Pölten	NV Arena	8,000
SV Stripfing	Weikendorf	Sportplatz Stripfing	500
ASK Voitsberg	Voitsberg	Hans Blümel Stadion	2,500

== League table ==
Pos	Team	Pld	W	D	L	GF	GA	GD	Pts	Promotion or relegation
1	SV Guntamatic Ried (C, P)	30	20	5	5	58	22	+36	65	Promotion to 2025–26 Austrian Football Bundesliga
2	Admira Wacker	30	18	5	7	48	31	+17	59	
3	Kapfenberger SV	30	17	3	10	53	49	+4	54	
4	SKN St. Pölten	30	15	8	7	56	34	+22	53	
5	First Vienna FC 1894	30	15	4	11	49	44	+5	49	
6	FC Liefering	30	13	4	13	43	44	−1	43	
7	Ertl Glas Amstetten	30	12	6	12	49	40	+9	42	
8	SK Sturm Graz II	30	11	9	10	48	43	+5	42	
9	Schwarz-Weiß Bregenz	30	11	5	14	52	57	−5	38	
10	SK Rapid II	30	11	4	15	49	57	−8	37	
11	FAC WIEN	30	9	10	11	30	35	−5	37	
12	Austria Lustenau	30	8	13	9	24	26	−2	37	
13	SV Stripfing	30	8	10	12	39	43	−4	34	
14	ASK Voitsberg (R)	30	9	5	16	30	41	−11	32	Relegation to 2025–26 Austrian Football Regionalliga
15	SV Horn (R)	30	8	6	16	40	61	−21	30	Relegation to 2025–26 Austrian Football Regionalliga
16	Licht-Loidl Lafnitz (R)	30	3	7	20	40	81	−41	16	Relegation to 2025–26 Austrian Football Regionalliga

Source: 2.Liga Table
Rules for classification: 1) Points; 2) Direct Duel; 3) Goal difference; 4) Goals scored; 5) Matches won; 6) Away matches won; 7) Away goals scored
(C) Champions; (P) Promoted; (R) Relegated

== Results ==
Home \ Away	ADM	AMS	AUL	BRE	FVI	FAC	HOR	KAP	LAF	LIE	RAP	RIE	STU	STP	STR	VOI
Admira Wacker	—	1–0	0–0	3–2	3–1	2–1	1–3	0–1	1–0	4–0	3–1	1–0	2–3	1–1	2–2	1–0
Ertl Glas Amstetten	3–2	—	1–2	1–2	1–3	2–1	0–0	3–0	5–0	3–1	2–2	2–3	3–1	0–0	1–0	0–3
Austria Lustenau	0–1	0–1	—	2–1	0–1	1–1	1–0	1–2	0–0	1–2	2–2	1–1	0–0	0–1	1–1	3–0
Schwarz-Weiß Bregenz	1–2	2–1	1–1	—	3–2	0–1	3–1	4–0	4–1	2–0	1–5	1–4	3–2	0–4	1–3	2–1
First Vienna FC 1894	0–2	1–3	3–0	2–1	—	0–2	1–0	0–2	2–1	3–1	3–1	0–1	2–4	2–1	3–1	1–0
FAC WIEN	1–2	1–0	0–0	1–1	2–1	—	1–1	1–1	3–1	0–1	2–0	0–1	1–1	2–0	0–0	0–4
SV Horn	0–0	3–3	1–2	3–2	3–6	0–2	—	3–1	4–1	0–1	2–3	0–1	2–2	2–4	1–1	2–1
KSV 1919	3–4	3–2	0–2	5–3	1–2	3–1	2–0	—	6–4	0–2	2–1	2–1	1–1	2–0	3–2	3–0
Licht-Loidl Lafnitz	1–1	1–5	2–2	1–4	0–1	2–2	5–1	1–2	—	4–5	3–1	0–3	0–4	2–2	2–2	1–3
FC Liefering	1–0	1–3	0–1	2–2	0–1	3–0	0–1	2–0	4–1	—	1–1	3–1	2–2	2–4	2–1	1–2
SK Rapid II	0–3	1–0	2–0	1–1	1–0	2–0	5–1	0–2	2–3	1–4	—	0–5	4–2	0–1	2–3	4–0
SV Guntamatic Ried	2–0	1–1	1–1	3–0	1–0	2–0	4–0	3–0	4–0	2–0	2–3	—	2–1	2–4	2–1	0–0
SK Sturm Graz II	3–1	2–1	0–1	0–0	4–1	0–0	1–3	1–2	2–1	1–0	1–0	0–3	—	2–4	3–0	1–1
SKN St. Pölten	0–1	1–1	0–0	3–1	3–3	3–2	4–1	3–1	3–0	0–0	3–1	1–2	0–2	—	0–0	3–0
SV Stripfing	0–2	2–0	2–0	0–2	2–2	1–2	3–0	1–1	1–1	2–1	2–3	0–1	2–1	2–1	—	1–2
ASK Voitsberg	1–2	1–2	1–0	2–1	0–2	0–0	0–2	1–2	2–1	0–1	3–0	0–1	1–1	0–2	1–1	—

Updated to match(es) played on unknown. Source: soccerway.com
Legend: Blue = home team win; Yellow = draw; Red = away team win.

== Positions by round ==
Team ╲ Round	1	2	3	4	5	6	7	8	9	10	11	12	13	14	15	16	17	18	19	20	21	22	23	24	25	26	27	28	29	30
SV Guntamatic Ried	6	1	1	1	1	1	1	1	4	4	2	2	2	2	2	2	2	2	2	2	2	2	2	2	2	2	1	1	1	1
Admira Wacker	13	6	5	5	5	7	3	4	1	1	1	1	1	1	1	1	1	1	1	1	1	1	1	1	1	1	2	2	2	2
Kapfenberger SV	5	3	2	2	2	2	2	2	5	3	4	5	6	4	6	7	8	8	9	7	6	6	6	6	4	4	3	3	4	3
SKN St. Pölten	16	13	12	14	15	14	13	13	11	11	10	11	11	10	8	8	5	6	5	5	5	5	5	5	5	5	5	4	3	4
First Vienna FC	4	7	7	9	9	9	6	8	8	7	5	4	3	3	3	3	3	3	3	4	4	4	3	3	3	3	4	5	5	5
FC Liefering	14	8	8	10	11	11	12	10	12	12	11	8	8	8	10	11	10	10	10	10	10	9	8	8	7	8	9	6	6	6
SKU Ertl Glas Amstetten	3	4	4	3	4	5	8	7	7	8	7	6	5	7	5	6	7	7	8	9	9	10	10	10	9	10	11	10	8	7
SK Sturm Graz II	10	12	15	15	13	13	14	11	9	9	10	9	9	9	9	9	9	9	7	6	8	8	9	9	10	7	7	8	7	8
Schwarz-Weiß Bregenz	9	5	6	8	6	3	4	3	2	2	3	3	4	6	4	4	4	4	5	3	3	3	4	4	6	6	6	7	9	9
SK Rapid II	2	2	3	4	3	4	7	5	3	5	6	7	7	5	7	5	6	5	6	8	7	7	7	7	8	9	8	9	10	10
Floridsdorfer AC	1	9	9	6	7	8	9	9	10	10	12	12	12	12	12	13	13	13	13	13	13	13	14	14	12	11	10	11	11	11
SC Austria Lustenau	7	10	10	7	8	6	5	6	6	6	8	10	10	11	11	10	12	12	12	12	12	11	11	11	13	12	12	12	12	12
SV Stripfing	15	15	14	13	10	10	11	14	14	15	15	16	15	14	14	15	14	14	14	14	14	14	13	13	14	14	14	14	14	13
ASK Voitsberg	12	14	16	16	16	16	16	16	15	14	14	14	13	13	13	12	11	11	11	11	11	12	12	12	11	13	13	13	13	14
SV Horn	11	16	11	11	12	12	10	12	13	13	13	15	16	15	15	16	16	15	15	15	15	15	15	15	15	15	15	15	15	15
SV Licht-Loidl Lafnitz	8	11	13	12	14	15	15	15	16	16	16	13	14	16	16	14	15	16	16	16	16	16	16	16	16	16	16	16	16	16

Promotion to Austrian Bundesliga
Relegation to Austrian Regionalliga

Updated to match(es) played on 25 May 2025. Source: 2liga.at

== Results by round ==
Team ╲ Round	1	2	3	4	5	6	7	8	9	10	11	12	13	14	15	16	17	18	19	20	21	22	23	24	25	26	27	28	29	30
Admira Wacker	L	W	W	W	W	W	W	D	W	W	L	W	W	W	D	W	W	D	W	W	D	W	W	D	L	L	L	W	L	L
SKU Ertl Glas Amstetten	W	W	D	W	L	L	L	D	W	L	W	W	W	L	W	L	L	D	L	L	D	D	D	L	W	L	L	W	W	W
SC Austria Lustenau	D	D	D	W	D	W	D	D	W	D	D	L	L	D	L	D	L	L	W	D	L	W	L	L	D	W	W	D	L	W
Schwarz-Weiß Bregenz	D	W	D	L	W	W	W	W	W	D	D	D	L	L	W	W	L	W	L	W	W	L	L	L	L	L	L	L	L	L
First Vienna FC	W	L	D	L	W	W	L	W	L	W	W	W	W	W	L	W	L	W	L	D	W	L	W	L	W	W	L	D	L	L
Floridsdorfer AC	W	L	L	W	D	L	L	W	L	D	L	D	W	L	D	L	D	L	W	D	L	L	D	W	W	W	W	D	D	D
SV Horn	L	L	W	L	L	L	W	D	L	D	L	L	L	L	D	L	L	W	L	D	L	L	D	W	W	L	W	D	W	W
Kapfenberger SV	W	W	W	W	W	L	W	L	L	W	L	L	D	W	L	L	D	D	L	W	W	W	L	W	W	W	W	W	L	W
SV Licht-Loidl Lafnitz	D	L	L	D	L	L	L	L	L	L	W	W	L	L	L	D	L	D	D	L	L	L	D	L	L	W	L	L	L	D
FC Liefering	L	W	D	L	D	W	L	W	L	D	W	W	D	L	L	L	W	L	W	L	W	W	W	W	L	L	L	W	W	L
SK Rapid II	W	W	D	W	L	W	L	W	W	L	L	D	D	L	W	W	L	W	L	L	D	W	L	L	L	L	W	L	L	L
SV Guntamatic Ried	W	W	W	W	W	D	W	L	L	D	W	L	W	W	W	W	W	W	L	W	W	D	W	W	D	L	W	W	W	W
SK Sturm Graz II	D	L	L	L	D	W	D	D	W	D	W	W	L	W	D	L	W	D	W	W	L	L	D	W	L	W	L	L	W	D
SKN St. Pölten	L	D	D	L	L	L	W	D	W	D	W	L	W	W	W	W	W	D	W	D	D	W	L	L	W	W	W	W	W	D
SV Stripfing	L	L	D	D	W	L	L	D	L	L	L	D	D	D	L	L	W	L	D	D	W	W	W	D	D	W	L	L	W	W
ASK Voitsberg	L	L	L	L	L	D	L	D	W	W	L	L	L	W	W	W	W	L	W	L	L	L	D	W	D	L	W	L	D	L

Updated to match(es) played on 25 May 2025. Source: 2liga.at
W = Win; D = Draw; L = Lose

== Season statistics ==
=== Top scorers ===
Rank	Player	Club	Goals
1	(France) Claudy M'Buyi	St. Pölten	21
2	(Austria) Alexander Hofleitner	KSV 1919	18
3	(Austria) Deni Alar	Flyeralarm Admira	14
4	(Ivory Coast) Wilfried Eza	Guntamatic Ried	12
5	(Austria) Mark Große	Guntamatic Ried	11
5	(Ghana) Kelvin Boateng	First Vienna	11
5	(Austria) Tobias Hedl	Rapid II	11
8	(Austria) Peter Kiedl	Sturm Graz II	9
8	(Austria) Dominik Weixelbraun	SKU Ertl Glass Amsetten	9
8	(Germany) Jannik Wanner	SKU Ertl Glass Amsetten	9
8	(Austria) Ante Bajic	Guntamatic Ried	9
8	(Brazil) Renan Peixoto	SW Bregenz	9
8	(Mali) Gaoussou Diakité	Liefering	9

=== Top assists ===
Rank	Player	Club	Assists
1	(Germany) Jannik Wanner	SKU Ertl Glass Amsetten	10
2	(Austria) Mark Große	Ried	9
3	(Austria) Christoph Messerer	St. Pölten	8
3	(Austria) Ante Bajic	Guntamatic Ried	8
5	(Kosovo) Florian Haxha	Kapfenberger SV	7
6	(Austria) Winfred Amoah	SKU Ertl Glass Amsetten	6
6	(Austria) Luca Edelhofer	First Vienna	6

== Attendances ==
#	Club	Average
1	Ried	3,605
2	Lustenau	2,145
3	First Vienna	1,800
4	Admira	1,200
5	St. Pölten	1,150
6	Amstetten	961
7	Bregenz	938
8	Voitsberg	819
9	FAC	612
10	Kapfenberg	579
11	Rapid II	501
12	Liefering	331
13	Sturm Graz II	320
14	Lafnitz	311
15	Horn	283
16	Stripfing	172

== See also ==
- 2024–25 Austrian Football Bundesliga
- 2024–25 Austrian Cup
