= Bokila =

Bokila is a surname. Notable people with the surname include:

- Jeremy Bokila (born 1988), Congolese footballer, brother of Wim
- Wim Bokila (born 1987), Belgian footballer
