= Jeremy Bokila =

Congolese footballer (born 1988)

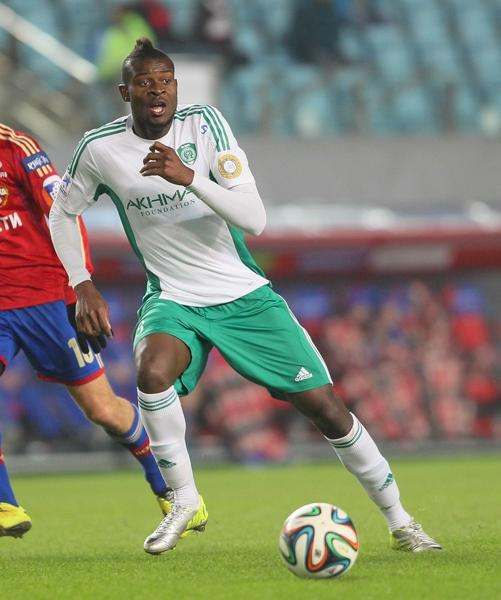
- Bokila with Terek Grozny in 2014

Personal information
- Full name: Jeremy Loteteka Bokila
- Date of birth: 14 November 1988 (age 38)
- Place of birth: Kinshasa, Zaire
- Height: 1.88 m (6 ft 2 in)
- Position: Forward

Team information
- Current team: Patro Eisden
- Number: 88

Youth career
- 1995–2005: ZSV Zelos
- 2005–2007: AGOVV

Senior career*
Years	Team	Apps	(Gls)
2007–2010	AGOVV	97	(31)
2010–2013	Zulte Waregem	25	(2)
2011–2012	→ Sparta (loan)	30	(15)
2012–2013	→ Petrolul Ploiești (loan)	31	(16)
2013–2015	Terek Grozny	36	(4)
2015–2017	Guangzhou R&F	13	(4)
2016	→ Eskişehirspor (loan)	13	(1)
2016–2017	→ Al-Kharitiyath (loan)	12	(3)
2017–2019	Akhisarspor	20	(4)
2017	→ CFR Cluj (loan)	5	(1)
2017	→ Dinamo București (loan)	12	(1)
2019	Hatayspor	6	(2)
2020	Ankara Keçiörengücü	12	(1)
2020	Thes Sport	0	(0)
2021	Oakland Roots	24	(5)
2022–2025	Willem II	94	(22)
2025–2026	Livingston	23	(5)
2026–	Patro Eisden	5	(0)

International career
2012–2017	DR Congo	20	(6)
- * Club domestic league appearances and goals as of 20 September 2026

Jeremy Loteteka Bokila (born 14 November 1988) is a Congolese professional footballer who plays for Challenger Pro League club Patro Eisden in Belgium. He formerly played for the DR Congo national team.

== Club career ==
Bokila was born in Kinshasa, DR Congo. In the summer of 2012, Bokila was loaned to Liga I team, Petrolul Ploiești, with an option to make the move permanent. In the first half of the season he netted six goals in the league and three in the cup for the Yellow Wolves. In March 2013, it was announced that after continuous outstanding performances, Petrolul Ploiești would make his move permanent in the summer.

In the 2012–13 Liga I season he played in 31 games and scored 16 goals, helping his team finish third in Liga I. In the same season he won the Romanian Cup with Petrolul Ploiești scoring the only goal in the final against CFR Cluj. He played a total of five games and scored six goals in the Romanian Cup in the 2012–13 season.

On 28 August 2013, Bokila joined Russian Premier League side Terek Grozny for a €2.5 million transfer fee from Petrolul who had acquired his services on loan from Zulte.

In July 2015, Bokila signed for Chinese Super League side Guangzhou R&F. For the second half of the 2015–16 season, this club loaned him to the Turkish Süper Lig club Eskişehirspor. After relegation in 2016, he returned, but was immediately loaned to Al-Kharitiyath in Qatar for one season.

In January 2017, Bokila moved to the Turkish Süper Lig club Akhisarspor. He became a part of the team that achieved the most successes in the club's history by winning the 2018 Turkish Super Cup and participating in the 2018–19 Turkish Cup final. After relegation in summer 2019, Bokila was signed by second-tier TFF First League club Hatayspor. In January 2020, he moved to Ankara Keçiörengücü. In October 2020, he signed with Thes Sport in the Belgian National Division 1. He was not yet eligible to play the game on 17 October against Mandel United and then the competition was postponed due to the COVID-19 pandemic.

On 21 January 2021, it was announced that Bokila had signed a contract with USL Championship club Oakland Roots.

Bokila joined Willem II on 6 July 2022, signing a one-year contract with the recently relegated Eerste Divisie club. He grew into a super-sub at the club, often scoring late goals. After Peter Maes took over as the team's head coach in September 2023, Bokila scored eight goals in four games in a row, playing a role as Willem II won the Eerste Divisie title at the end of the season, and reached promotion to the Eredivisie.

On 28 July 2025, Bokila signed for newly promoted Scottish Premiership side Livingston. He made his debut on the opening day of the season, coming on for Robbie Muirhead in the 82nd minute of a 2–2 draw away to Kilmarnock. In his second appearance, he scored in the 88th minute to seal a 3–1 home win over Falkirk at Almondvale.

In a match between Aberdeen and Livingston on 24 January 2026 at Pittodrie Stadium, with the former winning 6–2. Bokila was said to be "In tears" by then manager David Martindale after accusing Aberdeen defender Jack Milne of racially abusing him in an altercation between the pair during the match. The incident was referred to the SPFL. The tribunal concluded on a verdict of not proven on 11 May 2026.

He left Livi in May 2026 following the expiration of his contract.

== International career ==
Bokila has Congolese and Dutch citizenship but chose to represent the Democratic Republic of the Congo at senior level. Bokila made his national team debut against Burkina Faso on 14 November 2012.

At the 2015 Africa Cup of Nations, Bokila scored an equalising goal in a 1–1 draw with Tunisia to ensure that DR Congo qualified for the knockout stage. In the quarter-finals, he also levelled the scores in a 4–2 win against Congo in which DR Congo came back from 2–0 down.

== Personal life ==
Bokila was born in a footballing family. His father Ndingi Bokila Mandjombolo was known in the eighties as "the pearl of Harelbeke", being a valuable player and top scorer three times in a row at Belgian club K.R.C. Harelbeke, between 1980 and 1982.

His sister Esther and brothers Noé and Wim are also footballers, while Jeremy's older brother Paldy played for TOP Oss among other teams before giving up professional football and emigrating to Italy.

== Career statistics ==
=== Club ===
As of match played 25 October 2025

Appearances and goals by club, season and competition
Club	Season	League			National cup (Note: Includes KNVB Cup, Cupa României, Russian Cup, Chinese FA Cup, Turkish Cup, Scottish FA Cup)		League cup (Note: Includes Scottish League Cup)		Europe		Other		Total	
Club	Season	Division	Apps	Goals	Apps	Goals	Apps	Goals	Apps	Goals	Apps	Goals	Apps	Goals
AGOVV	2007–08	Eerste Divisie	33	7	2	0	—		—		—		35	7
AGOVV	2008–09	Eerste Divisie	33	14	2	1	—		—		—		35	15
AGOVV	2009–10	Eerste Divisie	25	7	1	0	—		—		1 (Note: Appearance(s) in Eredivisie promotion/relegation play-offs)	0	27	7
AGOVV	Total		91	28	5	1	—		—		1	0	97	29
Zulte Waregem	2010–11	Pro League	21	2	0	0	—		—		0	0	21	2
Zulte Waregem	2011–12	Pro League	2	0	0	0	—		—		—		2	0
Zulte Waregem	Total		23	2	0	0	—		—		0	0	23	2
Sparta (loan)	2011–12	Eerste Divisie	28	15	3	4	—		—		2	0	33	19
Petrolul Ploiești (loan)	2012–13	Liga I	31	16	6	6	—		—		—		37	22
Terek Grozny	2013–14	Russian Premier League	19	3	3	5	—		—		—		22	8
Terek Grozny	2014–15	Russian Premier League	17	1	1	0	—		—		—		18	1
Terek Grozny	Total		36	4	4	5	—		—		—		40	9
Guangzhou R&F	2015	Chinese Super League	13	4	1	0	—		0	0	—		14	4
Eskişehirspor (loan)	2015–16	Süper Lig	13	1	0	0	—		—		—		13	1
Al Kharaitiyat (loan)	2016–17	Qatar Stars League	12	3	0	0	—		—		—		12	3
Akhisarspor	2016–17	Süper Lig	4	0	1	0	—		—		—		5	0
Akhisarspor	2017–18	Süper Lig	0	0	0	0	—		—		—		0	0
Akhisarspor	2018–19	Süper Lig	16	4	7	3	—		0	0	—		29	4
Akhisarspor	Total		20	4	8	3	—		0	0	—		28	7
CFR Cluj (loan)	2017–18	Liga I	5	0	0	0	—		—		—		5	0
Dinamo București (loan)	2017–18	Liga I	12	1	1	0	—		—		—		13	1
Hatayspor	2019–20	TFF First League	6	2	1	0	—		—		—		7	2
Ankara Keçiörengücü	2019–20	TFF First League	12	1	0	0	—		—		—		12	1
Thes Sport	2020–21	National Division 1	0	0	0	0	—		—		—		0	0
Oakland Roots	2021	USL Championship	24	5	0	0	—		—		2 (Note: Appearance(s) in USL Championship play-offs)	1	26	6
Willem II	2022–23	Eerste Divisie	34	8	1	0	—		—		2	0	37	8
Willem II	2023–24	Eerste Divisie	32	11	2	0	—		—		—		34	11
Willem II	2024–25	Eredivisie	29	3	2	1	—		—		3	0	34	4
Willem II	Total		95	22	5	1	—		—		5	0	105	23
Livingston	2025–26	Scottish Premiership	9	3	0	0	1	0	—		—		10	3
Career total			430	111	34	20	1	0	0	0	10	1	475	132

=== International ===
As of match played 25 May 2016. DR Congo score listed first, score column indicates score after each Bokila goal.

International goals by date, venue, cap, opponent, score, result and competition
No.	Date	Venue	Cap	Opponent	Score	Result	Competition
1	10 September 2014	Stade TP Mazembe, Lubumbashi, Democratic Republic of the Congo	2	Sierra Leone	2–0	2–0	2015 Africa Cup of Nations qualification
2	15 October 2014	Stade Félix Houphouët-Boigny, Abidjan, Ivory Coast	4	Ivory Coast	3–1	4–3	2015 Africa Cup of Nations qualification
3	15 October 2014	Stade Félix Houphouët-Boigny, Abidjan, Ivory Coast	4	Ivory Coast	4–3	4–3	2015 Africa Cup of Nations qualification
4	26 January 2015	Estadio de Ebibeyin, Ebibeyin, Equatorial Guinea	9	Tunisia	1–1	1–1	2015 Africa Cup of Nations
5	31 January 2015	Estadio de Bata, Bata, Equatorial Guinea	10	Congo	2–2	4–2	2015 Africa Cup of Nations
6	25 May 2016	Stadio Giuseppe Sinigaglia, Como, Italy	16	Romania	1–1	1–1	Friendly

== Honours ==
Sparta Rotterdam

- Eerste Divisie runner-up: 2011–12

Petrolul Ploiești

- Cupa României: 2012–13

CFR Cluj

- Liga I: 2017–18

Akhisarspor

- Turkish Super Cup: 2018

Willem II

- Eerste Divisie: 2023–24

DR Congo

- Africa Cup of Nations bronze:2015
