= 2025–26 Livingston F.C. season =

Livingston
2025–26 season
- Chairman: Calvin Ford
- Manager: David Martindale (until 1 February); Marvin Bartley (from 1 February – 7 May); Scott Arfield (interim)
- Stadium: Almondvale Stadium
- Premiership: Twelfth place (relegated)
- Scottish Cup: Fourth round
- League Cup: Second round
- Top goalscorer: League: Lewis Smith (7); All: Robbie Muirhead (8)
- Highest home attendance: 8,952 vs. Heart of Midlothian, Premiership, 5 April 2026
- Lowest home attendance: 756 vs. Brora Rangers, League Cup, 19 July 2025
- Average home league attendance: 4,454
Home colours	Away colours

The 2025–26 season was Livingston's first season back in the Scottish Premiership, following their promotion from the Championship at the end of the 2024–25 season. Livingston also competed in the League Cup and the Scottish Cup.

== Season summary ==
On 16 May 2025, Livingston revealed that they had been the subject of a takeover led by the great-great-grandson of American industrialist Henry Ford. Calvin Ford was subsequently announced as the club's new chairman and majority shareholder after buying out 100% of previous owner John McIlvogue's stake in the club.

On 1 February, the club announced that David Martindale would be stepping down from his role as manager and instead taking up the position of Sporting Director. His assistant, and former Livingston midfielder, Marvin Bartley was promoted in his place.

== Results & fixtures ==
Win Draw Loss Postponed

=== Friendlies ===
28 June 2025 Friendly	Alloa Athletic	1–3	Livingston	Alloa
	Sammon 45'	Report	Muirhead 30' (pen.); McAlear 55'; May 68'	Stadium: Recreation Park

3 July 2025 Friendly	Aris	1–3	Livingston	Rotterdam
			Finlayson; Carey; Winter	Stadium: Sportcomplex Varkenoord

5 July 2025 Friendly	K.V. Kortrijk	1–1	Livingston	Roosendaal
	De Smet	Kortrijk report	Muirhead 50'	Stadium: RBC Stadion

8 July 2025 Friendly	Greenock Morton	0–3	Livingston	Hamilton
14:00		Report	Welch-Hayes; Winter 30'; Yengi 75'	Stadium: New Douglas Park

=== Scottish Premiership ===
2 August 2025 1	Kilmarnock	2–2	Livingston	Kilmarnock
15:00	Daniels 38'; Watson 42'; Stanger (red card) 65'	Report	Muirhead 66' (pen.); Pittman 86'	Stadium: Rugby Park; Attendance: 5,291; Referee: Matthew MacDermid

9 August 2025 2	Livingston	3–1	Falkirk	Livingston
15:00	Pittman 18'; Smith 45+3'; Bokila 88'	Report	MacIver 74'	Stadium: Almondvale Stadium; Attendance: 3,316; Referee: Chris Graham

23 August 2025 3	Celtic	3–0	Livingston	Glasgow
15:00	Nygren 47', 71'; Kenny 76'	Report		Stadium: Celtic Park; Attendance: 58,548; Referee: Kevin Clancy

30 August 2025 4	Livingston	1–2	Heart of Midlothian	Livingston
15:00	Smith 26'	Report	Braga 47'; Kyziridis 90+1'	Stadium: Almondvale Stadium; Attendance: 7,770; Referee: Duncan Nicolson

13 September 2025 5	Aberdeen	0–0	Livingston	Aberdeen
15:00		Report		Stadium: Pittodrie Stadium; Attendance: 17,088; Referee: Nick Walsh

20 September 2025 6	Dundee	3–2	Livingston	Dundee
15:00	Murray 43'; Westley 66'; Jones 90+7' (pen.)	Report	Robertson 74' (o.g.); Bokila 83' (pen.)	Stadium: Dens Park; Attendance: 5,018; Referee: Ross Hardie

28 September 2025 7	Livingston	1–2	Rangers	Livingston
15:00	Sylla 68'	Report	Tavernier 23'; Aarons 90+4'	Stadium: Almondvale Stadium; Attendance: 8,590; Referee: John Beaton

4 October 2025 8	Dundee United	1–1	Livingston	Dundee
15:00	Keresztes 48'	Report	Pittman 34'	Stadium: Tannadice Park; Attendance: 5,018; Referee: Ross Hardie

18 October 2025 9	Hibernian	4–0	Livingston	Edinburgh
15:00	Klidjé 9'; McGrath 52' (pen.); Hoilett 79', 89'	Report		Stadium: Easter Road; Attendance: 17,947; Referee: Ryan Lee

25 October 2025 10	Livingston	1–2	Motherwell	Livingston
15:00	Bokila 26' (pen.)	Report	Stamatelopoulos 59' (pen.); Just 90+3'	Stadium: Almondvale Stadium; Attendance: 2,429; Referee: Nick Walsh

1 November 2025 11	Livingston	2–2	Hibernian	Livingston
15:00	Bokila 37'; Carey 90+1' (pen.)	Report	McGrath 1'; Boyle 55'	Stadium: Almondvale Stadium; Attendance: 3,921; Referee: Calum Scott

8 November 2025 12	Falkirk	1–1	Livingston	Falkirk
15:00	Graham 16' (pen.)	Report	Wilson 89'	Stadium: Falkirk Stadium; Attendance: 7,176; Referee: Grant Irvine

22 November 2025 13	Rangers	2–1	Livingston	Glasgow
15:00	Fernandez 9'; Diomande 78'	Report	Yengi 18'	Stadium: Ibrox Stadium; Attendance: 49,686; Referee: Ross Hardie

30 November 2025 14	Livingston	0–1	Aberdeen	Livingston
15:00		Report	Devlin 80'	Stadium: Almondvale Stadium; Attendance: 3,584; Referee: Don Robertson

6 December 2025 15	Motherwell	3–0	Livingston	Motherwell
15:00	Watt 18'; Stamatelopoulos 60' (pen.); Longelo 88'	Report		Stadium: Fir Park; Attendance: 5,683; Referee: Ryan Lee

13 December 2025 16	Livingston	2–2	Dundee	Livingston
15:00	Bokila 64'; Yengi 85'; McGowan (red card) 90+6'	Report	Dhanda 13'; Congreve 18'	Stadium: Almondvale Stadium; Attendance: 3,094; Referee: Don Robertson

20 December 2025 17	St Mirren	1–0	Livingston	Paisley
15:00	Mandron 72'	Report		Stadium: St Mirren Park; Attendance: 5,764; Referee: Chris Graham

27 December 2025 18	Livingston	2–4	Celtic	Livingston
15:00	Montaño 3', 8'	Report	Nygren 6', 31'; Yang 10'; Engels 39' (pen.)	Stadium: Almondvale Stadium; Attendance: 8,861; Referee: Matthew MacDermid

30 December 2025 19	Livingston	1–3	Dundee United	Livingston
19:45	McLennan 90+1'	Report	Sapsford 6', 31'; McGowan 86' (o.g.); Fatah 90'	Stadium: Almondvale Stadium; Attendance: 2,657; Referee: Grant Irvine

3 January 2026 20	Heart of Midlothian	1–0	Livingston	Edinburgh
15:00	Halkett 18'	Report		Stadium: Tynecastle Park; Attendance: 18,504; Referee: Chris Graham

10 January 2026 21	Livingston	1–1	Kilmarnock	Livingston
15:00	McLennan 45+1'	Report	Dackers 70'	Stadium: Almondvale Stadium; Attendance: 2,281; Referee: Don Robertson

20 January 2026 22	Livingston	1–1	St Mirren	Livingston
19:45	Muirhead 56'	Report	Gogić 89'	Stadium: Almondvale Stadium; Attendance: 1,564; Referee: Duncan Nicolson

24 January 2026 23	Aberdeen	6–2	Livingston	Aberdeen
15:00	Bilalović 9'; Nisbet 45+4', 45+8'; Milne (red card) 69'; Nilsen 75'; Keskinen 85', 90+2'	Report	Susoho 28'; Muirhead 31'; Bokila (red card) 70'	Stadium: Pittodrie Stadium; Attendance: 17,794; Referee: Ross Hardie

31 January 2026 24	Livingston	0–2	Motherwell	Livingston
15:00		Report	Maswanhise 5', 28'	Stadium: Almondvale Stadium; Attendance: 2,785; Referee: Steven McLean

4 February 2026 25	Livingston	1–2	Falkirk	Livingston
19:45	McLennan 47'	Report	Wilson 6'; Marsh 25'	Stadium: Almondvale Stadium; Attendance: 2,790; Referee: Matthew MacDermid

11 February 2026 26	Celtic	2–1	Livingston	Glasgow
19:45	Saracchi 15'; Oxlade-Chamberlain 90+1'	Report	Muirhead 57' (pen.)	Stadium: Celtic Park; Attendance: 58,292; Referee: Calum Scott

14 February 2026 27	Dundee	2–2	Livingston	Dundee
15:00	Murray 3', 5'	Report	Smith 15'; Pittman 19'	Stadium: Dens Park; Attendance: 6,032; Referee: Nick Walsh

22 February 2026 28	Livingston	2–2	Rangers	Livingston
15:00	Kabongolo 14'; Smith 55'; Montaño (red card) 60'	Report	Fernandez 81'; Moore 88'	Stadium: Almondvale Stadium; Attendance: 8,736; Referee: Ryan Lee

28 February 2026 29	Livingston	1–1	St Mirren	Livingston
15:00	Kabongolo 76'	Report	Nlundulu 44'	Stadium: Almondvale Stadium; Attendance: 2,065; Referee: Don Robertson

14 March 2026 30	Hibernian	0–0	Livingston	Edinburgh
15:00		Report		Stadium: Easter Road; Attendance: 18,083; Referee: Lloyd Wilson

21 March 2026 31	Kilmarnock	2–0	Livingston	Kilmarnock
15:00	Hugill 25'; Curtis 77'	Report	Kabongolo (red card) 84'	Stadium: Rugby Park; Attendance: 5,703; Referee: Ryan Lee

5 April 2026 32	Livingston	2–2	Heart of Midlothian	Livingston
14:00	May 5'; Smith 58'	Report	Shankland 24'; Braga 51'; Leonard (red card) 90+7'	Stadium: Almondvale Stadium; Attendance: 8,952; Referee: Kevin Clancy

11 April 2026 33	Dundee United	3–2	Livingston	Dundee
15:00	Ferry 19'; Keresztes 75'; Sapsford 90+3' (pen.)	Report	Smith 49', 53'	Stadium: Tannadice Park; Attendance: 8,470; Referee: Chris Graham

25 April 2026 34	St Mirren	0–2	Livingston	Paisley
15:00		Report	Gogić 67' (o.g.); Pittman 81'	Stadium: St Mirren Park; Attendance: 5,884; Referee: David Dickinson

1 May 2026 35	Livingston	2–2	Aberdeen	Livingston
19:45	Nouble 47'; Muirhead 78'	Report	Frame 24'; Finlayson 71' (o.g.)	Stadium: Almondvale Stadium; Attendance: 3,745; Referee: Calum Scott

9 May 2026 36	Dundee	3–0	Livingston	Dundee
15:00	Congreve 13'; Robertson 71'; Hay 83'	Report		Stadium: Dens Park; Attendance: 5,573; Referee: Colin Steven

12 May 2026 37	Dundee United	0–0	Livingston	Dundee
19:45		Report		Stadium: Tannadice Park; Attendance: 8,327; Referee: Grant Irvine

17 May 2026 38	Livingston	1–4	Kilmarnock	Livingston
14:00	May 19'	Report	Hugill 24', 58'; Cleșcenco 34'; Curtis 53'	Stadium: Almondvale Stadium; Attendance: 3,038; Referee: Ryan Lee

=== Scottish League Cup ===
==== Group stage ====
12 July 2025 Group Stage	East Fife	1–2	Livingston	Methil
15:00	Slattery 55'; Bah (red card) 90+6'	Report	Muirhead 45+1'; Tait 47'	Stadium: Bayview Stadium; Attendance: 743; Referee: Ross Hardie

16 July 2025 Group Stage	Kilmarnock	1–0	Livingston	Kilmarnock
19:45	Sylla 31' (o.g.)	Report		Stadium: Rugby Park; Attendance: 3,430; Referee: Sean Murdoch

19 July 2025 Group Stage	Livingston	2–0	Brora Rangers	Livingston
15:00	Wilson 31'; Rudden 84'	Report		Stadium: Almondvale Stadium; Attendance: 756; Referee: Daniel Graves

26 July 2025 Group Stage	Livingston	6–0	Kelty Hearts	Livingston
15:00	Winter 1'; Montgomery 27'; Muirhead 29', 38'; Blaney 85'; May 86'	Report		Stadium: Almondvale Stadium; Attendance: 843; Referee: Grant Irvine

==== Knockout phase ====
17 August 2025 Second round	Livingston	0–2	Hibernian	Livingston
15:00		Report	Klidjé 43'; Mulligan 87'	Stadium: Almondvale Stadium; Attendance: 4,696; Referee: Ross Hardie

=== Scottish Cup ===
17 January 2026 Fourth round	Livingston	1–1 (a.e.t.) (3–4 p)	St Mirren	Livingston
15:00	Arfield 11'	Report	Idowu 4'	Stadium: Almondvale Stadium; Attendance: 1,834; Referee: Matthew MacDermid

== Squad statistics ==
=== Appearances ===
As of 17 May 2026

No.	Pos	Nat	Player	Total		Premiership		League Cup		Scottish Cup	
No.	Pos	Nat	Player	Apps	Goals	Apps	Goals	Apps	Goals	Apps	Goals
2	DF	(Scotland) SCO	Cammy Kerr	11	0	8+3	0	0	0	0	0
3	DF	(Guinea-Bissau) GNB	Babacar Fati	12	0	6+6	0	0	0	0	0
5	DF	(Australia) AUS	Ryan McGowan	28	0	20+3	0	4	0	1	0
6	MF	(Scotland) SCO	Aidan Denholm	3	0	0+2	0	0+1	0	0	0
7	FW	(England) ENG	Joel Nouble	10	1	7+3	1	0	0	0	0
8	MF	(Scotland) SCO	Scott Pittman	40	5	28+6	5	4+1	0	0+1	0
9	FW	(Scotland) SCO	Robbie Muirhead	27	8	17+4	5	5	3	1	0
10	FW	(Scotland) SCO	Barrie McKay	7	0	2+5	0	0	0	0	0
11	MF	(Scotland) SCO	Connor McLennan	20	3	8+8	3	2+1	0	1	0
14	GK	(Scotland) SCO	Jack Hamilton	0	0	0	0	0	0	0	0
15	MF	(Scotland) SCO	Lewis Smith	40	7	26+9	7	4	0	1	0
17	FW	(Scotland) SCO	Stevie May	40	3	24+10	2	0+5	1	0+1	0
18	FW	(Democratic Republic of the Congo) COD	Jeremy Bokila	25	5	9+14	5	0+1	0	0+1	0
19	DF	(Northern Ireland) NIR	Daniel Finlayson	40	0	34	0	5	0	1	0
20	MF	(Ghana) GHA	Emmanuel Danso	14	0	7+6	0	0	0	0+1	0
21	FW	(Estonia) EST	Alex Tamm	5	0	0+5	0	0	0	0	0
22	MF	(Scotland) SCO	Andrew Shinnie	7	0	0+6	0	1	0	0	0
23	DF	(France) FRA	Brooklyn Kabongolo	15	2	13+2	2	0	0	0	0
24	MF	(France) FRA	Mohamed Sylla	37	1	24+8	1	4+1	0	0	0
25	MF	(Scotland) SCO	Macaulay Tait	39	1	29+4	0	5	1	1	0
26	MF	(Colombia) COL	Cristian Montaño	29	2	21+5	2	2	0	0+1	0
27	DF	(Scotland) SCO	Danny Wilson	36	2	31+1	1	4	1	0	0
28	GK	(France) FRA	Jérôme Prior	44	0	38	0	5	0	1	0
29	MF	(Curaçao) CUW	Joshua Zimmerman	7	0	0+7	0	0	0	0	0
31	FW	(Germany) GER	Jannik Wanner	3	0	0+1	0	0+2	0	0	0
32	GK	(Scotland) SCO	Jamie Smith	0	0	0	0	0	0	0	0
35	GK	(Scotland) SCO	Evan Myles	0	0	0	0	0	0	0	0
36	FW	(Scotland) SCO	Sam Culbert	6	0	0+2	0	1+3	0	0	0
37	MF	(Canada) CAN	Scott Arfield	9	1	5+3	0	0	0	1	1
40	MF	(Nigeria) NGA	Samson Lawal	17	0	7+8	0	1	0	1	0
Players who left the club during the season
3	DF	(Scotland) SCO	Adam Montgomery	8	1	7	0	1	1	0	0
4	DF	(Republic of Ireland) IRL	Shane Blaney	8	1	3+2	0	2+1	1	0	0
7	FW	(Scotland) SCO	Zak Rudden	5	1	0+1	0	0+4	1	0	0
7	MF	(Spain) ESP	Mahamadou Susoho	19	1	13+5	1	0	0	1	0
10	MF	(Republic of Ireland) IRL	Graham Carey	11	1	2+5	1	2+2	0	0	0
16	FW	(Scotland) SCO	Andy Winter	15	1	4+6	0	3+2	1	0	0
20	DF	(England) ENG	Junior Robinson	1	0	0+1	0	0	0	0	0
30	DF	(Curaçao) CUW	Joshua Brenet	14	0	9+4	0	0	0	1	0
38	DF	(Scotland) SCO	Codi Stark	0	0	0	0	0	0	0	0
39	FW	(Australia) AUS	Tete Yengi	20	2	10+8	2	0+1	0	0+1	0

== Team statistics ==
=== League table ===
Pos	Team	Pld	W	D	L	GF	GA	GD	Pts	Qualification or relegation (Note: Teams played each other three times (33 matches), before the league was split into two groups (the top six and the bottom six).)
8	Dundee	38	11	9	18	42	61	−19	42	
9	Aberdeen	38	11	7	20	40	55	−15	40	
10	Kilmarnock	38	10	10	18	50	68	−18	40	
11	St Mirren (O)	38	8	10	20	30	55	−25	34	Qualification for the Premiership play-off final
12	Livingston (R)	38	2	15	21	40	75	−35	21	Relegation to Championship

Rules for classification: 1) Points; 2) Goal difference; 3) Goals scored; 4) Head-to-head points; 5) Head-to-head goal difference; 6) Play-off (only if deciding champion, UEFA competition qualification, second stage group allocation, or relegation).
(O) Play-off winners; (R) Relegated

=== League Cup table ===
Pos	Team	Pld	W	PW	PL	L	GF	GA	GD	Pts	Qualification	KIL	LIV	EFI	KEL	BRO
1	Kilmarnock	4	3	0	1	0	7	0	+7	10	Qualification for the second round	—	1–0	4–0	—	—
2	Livingston	4	3	0	0	1	10	2	+8	9	Qualification for the second round	—	—	—	6–0	2–0
3	East Fife	4	2	0	0	2	5	6	−1	6		—	1–2	—	—	3–0
4	Kelty Hearts	4	1	1	0	2	4	7	−3	5		p0–0	—	0–1	—	—
5	Brora Rangers	4	0	0	0	4	0	11	−11	0		0–2	—	—	0–4	—

Rules for classification: 1) goal difference, 2) goals scored, 3) away goals scored, 4) matches won, 5) away matches won, 6) drawing of lots.

== Transfers ==
=== Players in ===
Player	From	Fee
(Scotland) Connor McLennan	(Scotland) Ayr United	Free
(Republic of Ireland) Graham Carey	(Scotland) St Johnstone	Free
(Scotland) Stevie May	(Scotland) St Johnstone	Free
(Scotland) Zak Rudden	(Scotland) Queen's Park	Free
(Republic of Ireland) Shane Blaney	(Scotland) Motherwell	Free
(Scotland) Cammy Kerr	(Scotland) Queen's Park	Free
(France) Mohamed Sylla	(Scotland) Dundee	Free
(Germany) Jannik Wanner	(Austria) SKU Amstetten	Undisclosed
(Scotland) Lewis Latona	(Scotland) Hamilton Academical	Free
(France) Brooklyn Kabongolo	(England) Aveley	Free
(Scotland) Aidan Denholm	(Scotland) Heart of Midlothian	Undisclosed
(Democratic Republic of the Congo) Jeremy Bokila	(Netherlands) Willem II	Free
(Curaçao) Joshua Brenet	(Qatar) Al-Rayyan	Free
(Ghana) Emmanuel Danso	(Norway) Stabæk	Free
(Curaçao) Joshua Zimmerman	(Netherlands) TOP Oss	Undisclosed
(Canada) Scott Arfield	(Scotland) Falkirk	Free
(Guinea-Bissau) Babacar Fati	(Finland) SJK Seinäjoki	Undisclosed
(Scotland) Jamie Smith	(Scotland) Hamilton Academical	Free
(Scotland) Mitchell Robertson	(Scotland) Celtic	Undisclosed
(Scotland) Barrie McKay	Free agent	Free
(England) Joel Nouble	(China) Shenzhen Juniors	Free

=== Players out ===
Player	To	Fee
(Scotland) Jamie Brandon	(Scotland) Kilmarnock	Free
(Northern Ireland) Matthew Clarke	(Northern Ireland) Ballymena United	Free
(Scotland) Stephen Kelly	(United States) Orange County SC	Free
(Saint Kitts and Nevis) Michael Nottingham	(England) Brackley Town	Free
(Scotland) Tommy Sharp	(Scotland) Stranraer	Free
(Scotland) Lucas Stenhouse	(Scotland) Linlithgow Rose	Free
(Scotland) Reece McAlear	(Scotland) St Johnstone	Undisclosed
(South Africa) Aphelele Teto	(South Africa) Mamelodi Sundowns	Free
(Scotland) Zak Rudden	(Scotland) Dunfermline Athletic	Undisclosed
(England) Miles Welch-Hayes	(England) Maidenhead United	Free
(Republic of Ireland) Shaun Donnellan	(England) Truro City	Free
(Curaçao) Joshua Brenet	(Turkey) Kayserispor	Undisclosed

=== Loans in ===
Player	From	Fee
(Scotland) Macaulay Tait	(Scotland) Heart of Midlothian	Loan
(Scotland) Adam Montgomery	(Scotland) Celtic	Loan
(England) Junior Robinson	(England) West Ham United	Loan
(Spain) Mahamadou Susoho	(England) Manchester City	Loan
(Estonia) Alex Tamm	(Slovenia) Olimpija Ljubljana	Loan

=== Loans out ===
Player	To	Fee
(England) Liam Sole	(Scotland) Inverness CT	Loan
(Scotland) Codi Stark	(Scotland) Shotts Bon Accord	Loan
(Scotland) Dylan Mauchin	(Scotland) Cowdenbeath	Loan
(Scotland) Lewis Latona	(Scotland) East Fife	Loan
(Republic of Ireland) Shaun Donnellan	(England) Truro City	Loan
(Germany) Jannik Wanner	(Scotland) St Johnstone	Loan
(France) Brooklyn Kabongolo	(Scotland) Arbroath	Loan
(Scotland) Sam Culbert	(Scotland) East Fife	Co-operation loan
(Scotland) Zac McGoldrick	(Scotland) Whitburn	Loan
(Scotland) Andy Winter	(Scotland) Raith Rovers	Loan
(Republic of Ireland) Shane Blaney	(Republic of Ireland) Sligo Rovers	Loan
(Australia) Tete Yengi	(Japan) Machida Zelvia	Loan
(Republic of Ireland) Graham Carey	(Scotland) Dunfermline Athletic	Loan

== See also ==
List of Livingston F.C. seasons
