= Taha Yalçıner =

Turkish footballer

Personal information
- Date of birth: 12 January 1987 (age 39)
- Place of birth: Üsküdar, Turkey
- Height: 1.78 m (5 ft 10 in)
- Position: Midfielder

Team information
- Current team: Kuşadasıspor
- Number: 88

Senior career*
Years	Team	Apps	(Gls)
2007–2008	Fenerbahçe	0	(0)
2007–2008	→ Muğlaspor (loan)	23	(0)
2008–2013	Karşıyaka	93	(6)
2013	Adana Demirspor	10	(0)
2013–2016	Samsunspor	62	(9)
2016–2019	Alanyaspor	57	(1)
2019–2021	Akhisarspor	22	(1)
2021	Bandırmaspor	6	(0)
2021–2022	Sarıyer	31	(5)
2022–	Kuşadasıspor	7	(1)
- * Club domestic league appearances and goals as of 15 October 2022

Taha Yalçıner (born 12 January 1987) is a Turkish footballer who plays for Kuşadasıspor.
