= Junior Robinson (footballer) =

English footballer (born 2004)

Personal information
- Full name: Carl Junior Robinson
- Date of birth: 6 April 2004 (age 22)
- Place of birth: London, England
- Height: 5 ft 5 in (1.65 m)
- Position: Defender

Team information
- Current team: West Ham United

Youth career
- –2010: Senrab
- 2010–2022: West Ham United

Senior career*
Years	Team	Apps	(Gls)
2022–	West Ham United	0	(0)
2025	→ Sutton United (loan)	1	(0)
2025–2026	→ Livingston (loan)	1	(0)
2026–	→ Boreham Wood (loan)	5	(0)
- * Club domestic league appearances and goals as of 10 March 2026

Junior Robinson (born 6 April 2004) is an English professional footballer who plays as a defender for EFL Championship club West Ham United.

== Club career ==
Robinson came through the youth academy at West Ham United having joined at age six after being spotted playing for Senrab in Forest Gate. He went on loan to Sutton United in February 2025. However, he made just one league appearance during his spell at the club.

In September 2025, Robinson joined Scottish side Livingston on a season-long loan.. This loan was ended in January 2026 after just one appearance.

On 9 January 2026, Robinson joined National League club Boreham Wood on loan for the remainder of the season.

== International career ==
Robinson has represented England at both U15 level, and made his debut at U17 level against Belgium in late 2020.

== Career statistics ==
As of 10 March 2026

Appearances and goals by club, season and competition
Club	Season	League			National cup (Note: Includes FA Cup, Scottish Cup)		League cup (Note: Includes EFL Cup, Scottish League Cup)		Other		Total	
Club	Season	Division	Apps	Goals	Apps	Goals	Apps	Goals	Apps	Goals	Apps	Goals
West Ham United U21	2023–24	—			—		—		3 (Note: Appearance(s) in EFL Trophy)	0	3	0
West Ham United U21	2024–25	—			—		—		3	1	3	1
West Ham United U21	Total		—		—		—		6	1	6	1
West Ham United	2024–25	Premier League	0	0	0	0	0	0	—		0	0
West Ham United	2025–26	Premier League	0	0	0	0	0	0	—		0	0
West Ham United	Total		0	0	0	0	0	0	—		0	0
Sutton United (loan)	2024–25	National League	1	0	0	0	—		0	0	1	0
Livingston (loan)	2025–26	Scottish Premiership	1	0	0	0	0	0	—		1	0
Boreham Wood (loan)	2025–26	National League	5	0	1	0	—		0	0	6	0
Career total			7	0	1	0	0	0	6	1	14	1
