= Hasan Ali Adıgüzel =

Turkish footballer (born 2000)

Hasan Adigüzel
Personal information
- Full name: Hasan Ali Adigüzel
- Date of birth: 3 April 2000 (age 26)
- Place of birth: Alaşehir, Turkey
- Height: 1.80 m (5 ft 11 in)
- Position: Midfielder

Team information
- Current team: Serik Belediyespor
- Number: 16

Youth career
- 2012–2013: Alaşehir Belediyespor
- 2013–2016: Akhisar Belediyespor

Senior career*
Years	Team	Apps	(Gls)
2016–2019	Akhisar Belediyespor	6	(1)
2020–2022	Akhisarspor	11	(1)
2022–	Serik Belediyespor	5	(0)

International career^{‡}
2015	Turkey U15	7	(0)
2015–2016	Turkey U16	15	(0)
2016–2017	Turkey U17	15	(1)
- * Club domestic league appearances and goals as of 23 October 2022 ‡ National team caps and goals as of 18 May 2018

Hasan Adigüzel (born 3 April 2000) is a Turkish footballer who plays as a midfielder for Serik Belediyespor.

== Professional career ==
A youth product of Akhisarspor, Hasan Ali made his professional debut for them in a 3-3 Turkish Cup tie on 30 November 2016, at the age of 16. He made his Süper Lig debut in a 0-0 tie with Kayserispor on 21 January 2017.

On 10 May 2018, Hasan Ali helped Akhisar Belediyespor win their first professional trophy, the 2017–18 Turkish Cup.

== Honours ==
Akhisarspor

- Turkish Cup (1): 2017-18
