= Babacar Fati =

Bissau-Guinean footballer (born 2000)

Personal information
- Date of birth: 1 February 2000 (age 26)
- Place of birth: Portugal
- Height: 1.77 m (5 ft 10 in)
- Position: Left-back

Team information
- Current team: Livingston
- Number: 3

Youth career
- –2016: Unidos de Lisboa
- 2016–2020: Sporting CP

Senior career*
Years	Team	Apps	(Gls)
2020–2022	Sporting CP B	4	(0)
2022–2023	SJK II	15	(5)
2022–2026	SJK	67	(5)
2026–	Livingston	12	(0)

International career^{‡}
2025–	Guinea-Bissau	2	(0)
- * Club domestic league appearances and goals as of 20 May 2026 ‡ National team caps and goals as of 28 April 2025

Babacar Fati (born 1 February 2000) is a professional football player who plays as a left-back for Scottish Championship club Livingston. Born in Portugal, he represents the Guinea-Bissau national team.

== Club career ==
Fati started football in the youth sector of Unidos de Lisboa, and later joined the youth academy of Sporting CP, and made his senior debut with the reserve team Sporting CP B in 2020.

On 16 August 2022, Fati moved to Finland after signing with SJK Seinäjoki in Veikkausliiga. Initially, he featured for both the first team and the reserve team SJK Akatemia. On 26 March 2024, his deal with SJK was extended until the end of 2025, with an option for 2026.

On 19 January 2026, Fati moved to Scotland, joining Premiership club Livingston on a contract until June 2029 for an undisclosed fee.

== International career ==
On 13 March 2025, Fati received his first call-up to the Guinea-Bissau national team, for the 2026 FIFA World Cup qualification matches against Sierra Leone and Burkina Faso. He made his international debut on 20 March, in a match against Sierra Leone.

== Personal life ==
Fati is of Bissau-Guinean descent. His cousin Vítor Fati plays football for Camacha.

== Career statistics ==
=== Club ===
As of 21 May 2026

Appearances and goals by club, season and competition
Club	Season	League			National cup (Note: Includes Suomen Cup)		League cup (Note: Includes Ykköscup and Finnish League Cup)		Europe		Total	
Club	Season	Division	Apps	Goals	Apps	Goals	Apps	Goals	Apps	Goals	Apps	Goals
Sporting CP B	2020–21	Campeonato de Portugal	1	0	–		–		–		1	0
Sporting CP B	2021–22	Liga Portugal 3	3	0	–		–		–		3	0
Sporting CP B	Total		4	0	0	0	0	0	0	0	4	0
SJK Akatemia	2022	Ykkönen	1	1	–		–		–		1	1
SJK Akatemia	2023	Ykkönen	14	4	–		3	0	–		17	4
SJK Akatemia	Total		15	5	0	0	3	0	0	0	18	5
SJK	2022	Veikkausliiga	8	0	0	0	0	0	0	0	8	0
SJK	2023	Veikkausliiga	3	0	1	0	0	0	–		4	0
SJK	2024	Veikkausliiga	26	4	5	1	5	0	–		36	5
SJK	2025	Veikkausliiga	29	1	2	0	4	0	2	0	37	1
SJK	Total		66	5	8	1	9	0	2	0	85	6
Livingston	2025–26	Scottish Premiership	12	0	0	0	–		–		12	0
Career total			99	10	8	1	12	0	2	0	117	11

=== International ===
As of match played 24 March 2025

Appearances and goals by national team and year
National team	Year	Apps	Goals
Guinea-Bissau	2025	2	0
Total		2	0
