= Akhisar Municipal Stadium =

Stadium in Turkey

Coordinates: 38°54′58″N 27°50′16″E

- Akhisar Şehir Stadyumu
- Interactive map of Akhisar Municipal Stadium
- Location: Manisa, Turkey
- Capacity: 5.000
- Surface: Turf

Construction
- Opened: 1954
- Closed: 2012

Tenant
- Akhisar Belediyespor (1970–2012)

Akhisar Municipal Stadium (Turkish: Akhisar Şehir Stadyumu) was a stadium in Akhisar, Turkey. The stadium had a capacity of 5,000 seats. Since 1970 it was the stadium of football club Akhisarspor, but the stadium was closed in 2012.
