= Aidan Denholm =

Scottish footballer (born 2003)

Personal information
- Full name: Aidan Tomas Denholm
- Date of birth: 9 November 2003 (age 23)
- Place of birth: East Calder, West Lothian, Scotland
- Position: Central midfielder

Team information
- Current team: Livingston
- Number: 6

Youth career
- 2012–2021: Heart of Midlothian

Senior career*
Years	Team	Apps	(Gls)
2021–2025	Heart of Midlothian	17	(0)
2021–2022	→ Berwick Rangers (loan)	24	(1)
2023	→ East Fife (loan)	13	(0)
2024	→ Ross County (loan)	15	(0)
2025–	Livingston	2	(0)

International career^{‡}
2023–	Scotland U21	1	(0)
- * Club domestic league appearances and goals as of 20 May 2026 ‡ National team caps and goals as of 8 April 2024 (UTC)

Aidan Tomas Denholm (born 9 November 2003) is a Scottish professional footballer who plays as a central midfielder for Scottish Championship club Livingston.

He has previously played on loan for clubs Berwick Rangers, East Fife, and Ross County while at Hearts.

== Career ==
=== Heart of Midlothian ===
Denholm was born in East Calder, West Lothian and joined Heart of Midlothian aged eight. Coming on as a 77th minute sub, Denholm made his professional debut in a 3–0 victory over Cove Rangers in the League Cup.

==== 2021–22: Berwick Rangers loan ====
Denholm moved on loan to Berwick Rangers in 2021–22 on an initial six-month loan. Denholm scored his first goal for Berwick in a Scottish Cup 2–1 loss against Stirling Albion. His loan was extended in December 2021, seeing him stay with Berwick until the end of the season. Denholm made 24 appearances in all competitions for Berwick, as they finished eighth in the Lowland League.

==== 2022–23: East Fife loan ====
Following a successful first half of the season with Hearts B, Denholm joined League Two side, East Fife for the remainder of the season. Denholm made his debut a day later in a 1–1 draw to Stirling Albion. Becoming a regular feature during the second half of the season, Denholm played 15 times for East Fife in the league, who finished inside the play-offs. They lost in the semi-finals to Clyde.

==== 2023–24: Release and return to Hearts ====
Denholm was one of five youngsters who were released at the end of his contract after the 2022–23 season. Denholm was told of his release by then Hearts manager, Robbie Neilson and began looking elsewhere. Denholm was ready to work in a bank, with his mum, before going on trial to English League One side, Wigan Athletic. Driving back from his trial, his old B-team manager and new Hearts Technical Director, Steven Naismith, called Denholm and offered him a second chance at Hearts.

On 10 August 2023, Denholm made his UEFA Europa Conference League debut in a 2–1 loss to Rosenborg BK, coming on as a 71st minute substitute for Cameron Devlin. Three days later, Denholm made his Scottish Premiership debut for Hearts in a 0–0 draw to Kilmarnock, also coming on as a substitute for Devlin.

==== 2024–25: Ross County loan ====
On 26 July 2024, Denholm would join fellow Scottish Premiership club Ross County on loan for the 2024–25 season. On 4 January 2025, he was recalled by Hearts after suffering an injury in a Ross County game against Dundee.

=== Livingston ===
On 26 July 2025, Denholm signed for fellow Scottish Premiership club Livingston on a three-year deal. He picked up a hamstring injury during his debut the following day and missed most of the 2025-26 season.

== Career statistics ==
As of 3 September 2025

Club	Season	League			FA Cup		League Cup		Europe		Total	
Club	Season	Division	Apps	Goals	Apps	Goals	Apps	Goals	Apps	Goals	Apps	Goals
Heart of Midlothian	2021–22	Scottish Premiership	0	0	0	0	1	0	0	0	1	0
Heart of Midlothian	2022–23	Scottish Premiership	0	0	0	0	0	0	0	0	0	0
Heart of Midlothian	2023–24	Scottish Premiership	17	0	2	0	2	0	3	0	24	0
Heart of Midlothian	Total		17	0	2	0	3	0	3	0	25	0
Berwick Rangers (loan)	2021–22	Lowland League	—		—		—		—		24	1
East Fife (loan)	2022–23	League Two	14	0	0	0	0	0	—		14	0
Ross County (loan)	2024–25	Scottish Premiership	15	0	0	0	2	0	—		15	0
Livingston	2025-26	Scottish Premiership	0	0	0	0	1	0	—		1	0
Career total			44	0	2	0	6	0	3	0	79	1
