= Brooklyn Kabongolo =

French footballer

Personal information
- Full name: Brooklyn Lukongola Kabongolo
- Date of birth: 16 October 2002 (age 24)
- Place of birth: France
- Position: Defender

Team information
- Current team: Livingston
- Number: 23

Youth career
- 2019–2023: Ipswich Town

Senior career*
Years	Team	Apps	(Gls)
2023	Billericay Town	4	(1)
2023–2024	Southend United	13	(1)
2024	Oxford City	9	(0)
2024–2025	Aveley	34	(3)
2025–	Livingston	16	(2)
2025	→ Arbroath (loan)	11	(2)
- * Club domestic league appearances and goals as of 20 May 2026

Brooklyn Lukongola Kabongolo (born 16 October 2002) is a French professional footballer who plays as a defender for Scottish Championship club Livingston.

== Club career ==
Kabongolo came through the youth academy at Ipswich Town, but left the club without making a single first team appearance. After his exit from Portman Road, Kabongolo signed for Billericay Town in 2023. Some impressive performances led to the opportunity to sign for Southend United.

He signed for Southend United for the second half of the 2023-2024 season. The defender made 13 league appearances for the Shrimpers before deciding to leave the club in February 2024 after failing to agree a new deal.

He signed for Oxford City in July 2024. After making 9 first team appearances for the club, he was on the move again when he signed for Aveley in October 2024.

Kabongolo's good form earned him a move to Scottish side Livingston in July 2025, signing a two year deal with the West Lothian club.

In October 2025, he joined Arbroath on loan until the end of the 2025–26 season.

== Personal life ==
Kabongolo is of French and Congolese heritage.

== Career statistics ==
As of match played 14 February 2026

Appearances and goals by club, season and competition
Club	Season	League			National cup (Note: Includes FA Cup and Scottish Cup)		League cup (Note: Includes Scottish League Cup)		Other		Total	
Club	Season	Division	Apps	Goals	Apps	Goals	Apps	Goals	Apps	Goals	Apps	Goals
Billericay Town	2023–24	Isthmian League Premier Division	4	1	2	0	—		0	0	6	1
Southend United	2023–24	National League	13	1	0	0	—		0	0	13	1
Oxford City	2023–24	National League	9	0	0	0	—		0	0	9	0
Aveley	2024–25	National League South	34	3	0	0	—		1 (Note: Appearance(s) in FA Trophy)	1	35	4
Livingston	2025–26	Scottish Premiership	3	0	0	0	0	0	—		0	0
Arbroath (loan)	2025–26	Scottish Championship	4	0	0	0	0	0	0	0	4	0
Career total			64	5	2	0	0	0	1	1	67	6
