= Orhan Taşdelen =

Turkish footballer (born 1987)

Orhan Tasdelen
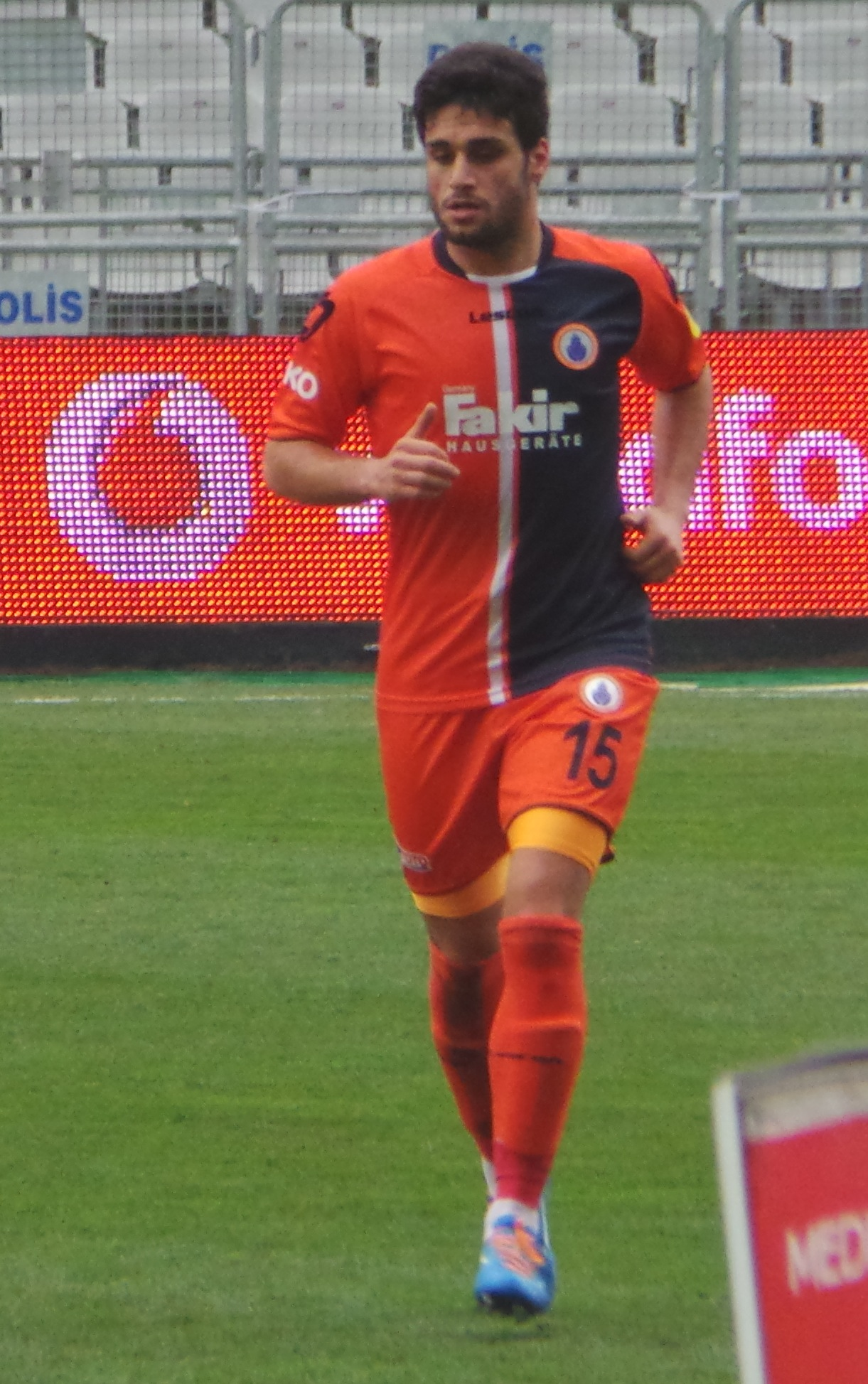

Personal information
- Date of birth: 6 February 1987 (age 39)
- Place of birth: Gaziantep, Turkey
- Height: 1.85 m (6 ft 1 in)
- Position: Defender

Team information
- Current team: 24 Erzincanspor

Youth career
- 1999–2006: Gaziantepspor

Senior career*
Years	Team	Apps	(Gls)
2006–2007	Gaziantepspor	2	(0)
2009–2012	Samsunspor	56	(2)
2012	Kayseri Erciyesspor	12	(0)
2012	Karsiyaka	16	(0)
2012–2013	Göztepe	14	(0)
2013–2015	İstanbul BB	25	(5)
2015–2018	Akhisar Belediyespor	35	(1)
2018–2019	Adana Demirspor	18	(1)
2019	→ Giresunspor (loan)	5	(0)
2020	Kırşehir Belediyespor	4	(0)
2020–	24 Erzincanspor	0	(0)
- * Club domestic league appearances and goals as of 15 March 2020

Orhan Tasdelen (born 6 February 1987) is a Turkish professional footballer who plays as a defender for 24 Erzincanspor.

== Professional career ==
On 10 May 2018, Orhan helped Akhisar Belediyespor win their first professional trophy, the 2017–18 Turkish Cup.

== Honours ==
Akhisarspor

- Turkish Cup (1): 2017-18
