= Bora Körk =

Turkish footballer

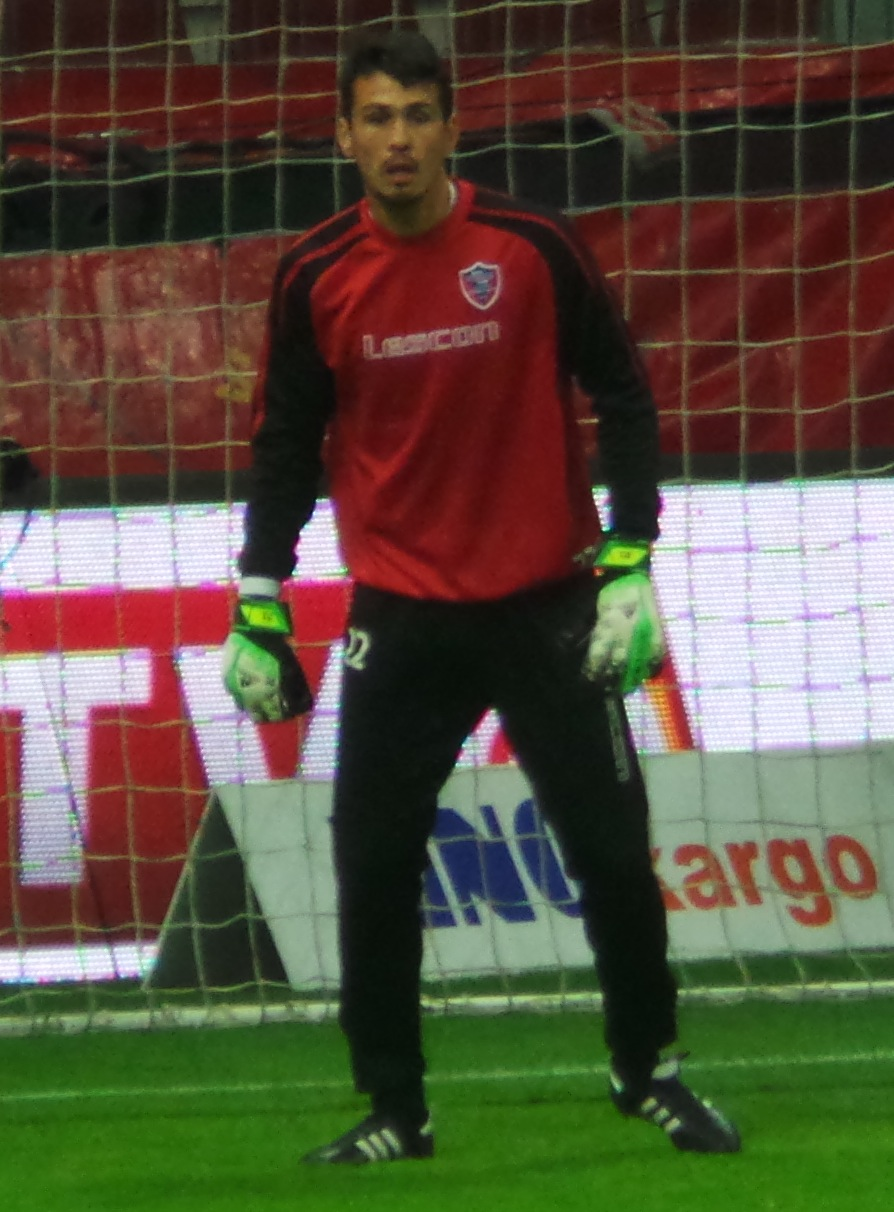

Personal information
- Date of birth: 9 June 1980 (age 46)
- Place of birth: İzmir, Turkey
- Height: 1.87 m (6 ft 1 1/2 in)
- Position: Goalkeeper

Youth career
- 1999–2002: Göztepe

Senior career*
Years	Team	Apps	(Gls)
2002–2004	Göztepe	33	(0)
2004–2007	Malatyaspor	30	(0)
2007–2008	Sakaryaspor	38	(0)
2008–2011	Ankaragücü	12	(0)
2011–2014	Karabükspor	15	(0)
2014–2015	Şanlıurfaspor	16	(0)
2015–2019	Akhisar Belediyespor	13	(0)
- * Club domestic league appearances and goals as of 25 May 2019

Bora Körk (born 9 June 1980 in Turkey) is a Turkish former footballer who played as a goalkeeper.

== Professional career ==
On 10 May 2018, Körk helped Akhisar Belediyespor win their first professional trophy, the 2017–18 Turkish Cup.

== Honours ==
Akhisarspor

- Turkish Cup (1): 2017-18
