= Florian Haxha =

Kosovan footballer (born 2002)

Personal information
- Date of birth: 6 April 2002 (age 24)
- Place of birth: Berlin, Germany
- Height: 1.78 m (5 ft 10 in)
- Position: Right midfielder

Team information
- Current team: Motor Lublin
- Number: 23

Youth career
- SG BW Hohenschönhausen
- –2015: Berliner FC Dynamo
- 2015–2021: Hertha BSC

Senior career*
Years	Team	Apps	(Gls)
2021–2023	Hertha BSC II	70	(6)
2023–2025	Kapfenberger SV	51	(6)
2025–	Motor Lublin	7	(0)

International career^{‡}
2019	Kosovo U17	2	(0)
2022–2024	Kosovo U21	12	(0)
2025–	Kosovo	2	(0)
- * Club domestic league appearances and goals as of 21:32, 29 May 2026 (UTC) ‡ National team caps and goals as of 6 July 2025

Florian Haxha (born 6 April 2002) is a Kosovan professional footballer who plays as a right midfielder for Ekstraklasa club Motor Lublin and the Kosovo national team.

== Club career ==
=== Early career and Hertha BSC II ===
Haxha began his career at SG BW Hohenschönhausen before joining Berliner FC Dynamo, where he played until the 2015–16 season when he transferred to Hertha BSC. On 23 July 2021, he made his debut for Hertha BSC II in a 4–0 away defeat against Germania Halberstadt after coming on as a substitute at 60th minute in place of Tony Fuchs. Eight days after debut, Haxha scored his first goal for Hertha BSC II in his third appearance for the club in a 1–1 away draw over Tasmania Berlin in Regionalliga Nordost.

=== Kapfenberger SV ===
On 2 September 2023, Haxha signed a two-year contract with Austrian Second League club Kapfenberger SV. His debut with Kapfenberger SV came twenty days later against SV Stripfing after being named in the starting line-up.

=== Motor Lublin ===
On 23 June 2025, Polish Ekstraklasa club Motor Lublin announced the signing of Haxha on a two-year deal.

== International career ==
From 2019, until 2024, Haxha has been part of Kosovo at youth international level, respectively has been part of the U17 and U21 teams and he with these teams played fourteen matches. On 30 May 2025, he received a call-up from Kosovo for the friendly matches against Armenia and Comoros. His debut with Kosovo came seven days later in the friendly match against Armenia after coming on as a substitute in the 64th minute in place of Ermal Krasniqi.

== Personal life ==
Haxha was born in Berlin, Germany to ethnic Albanian parents from Mitrovica.

== Career statistics ==
=== International ===
As of match played 9 June 2025

Appearances and goals by national team and year
National team	Year	Apps	Goals
Kosovo	2025	2	0
Total		2	0
