= Wim Bokila =

Belgian footballer (born 1987)

Personal information
- Date of birth: 28 September 1987 (age 39)
- Place of birth: Antwerp, Belgium
- Height: 1.86 m (6 ft 1 in)
- Position: Forward

Youth career
- ZSV Zelos

Senior career*
Years	Team	Apps	(Gls)
2009–2010	AGOVV	2	(0)
2011	Žilina	1	(0)
2011–2013	SDOUC	20	(14)
2013	Etar Veliko Tarnovo		
2014–2015	KSC Grimbergen	31	(12)
2015–2016	Eendracht Aalst	32	(20)
2016	Covilhã	11	(1)
2017	Achilles '29	3	(0)
2017	Ħamrun Spartans	2	(0)
2018	Jura Dolois	8	(2)
2018–2019	Hoogstraten	12	(2)
2019–2020	Kontich	20	(2)
2021–2023	Mazenzele Opwijk	45	(35)

Managerial career
- 2021-202?: Mazenzele Opwijk (youth)
- * Club domestic league appearances and goals

Wim Bokila (born 28 September 1987) is a Belgian former professional footballer who played as a forward.

== Personal life ==
Bokila was born in a footballing family. His father Ndingi Bokila Mandjombolo was known in the eighties as "the pearl of Harelbeke", being a valuable player and top scorer three times in a row at Belgian club K.R.C. Harelbeke, between 1980 and 1982.

His sister Esther and brothers Noé and Jeremy are also footballers, while Wim's older brother Paldy played for TOP Oss before giving up professional football and emigrating to Italy. His sister Aurelia is not a footballer. Neither is his mother Marie Veronique.
