= Yusuf Çoban =

German footballer (born 1996)

Personal information
- Full name: Yusuf Serdar Çoban
- Date of birth: 14 October 1996 (age 30)
- Place of birth: Aalen, Germany
- Height: 1.81 m (5 ft 11 in)
- Position: Forward

Team information
- Current team: TSV Essingen

Youth career
- Aalen
- 2011–2015: Stoke City

Senior career*
Years	Team	Apps	(Gls)
2015–2016	Stoke City	0	(0)
2015–2016	→ Stockport County (loan)	1	(0)
2016–2017	1899 Hoffenheim II	21	(9)
2017–2019	Alanyaspor	5	(0)
2018	→ İstanbulspor (loan)	5	(0)
2018	→ İnegölspor (loan)	5	(1)
2020	Berliner AK 07	13	(1)
2020–	TSV Essingen		
- * Club domestic league appearances and goals as of 15:19, 4 July 2024 (UTC)

Yusuf Serdar Çoban (born 14 October 1996) is a German professional footballer who plays as a forward for Oberliga Baden-Württemberg club TSV Essingen.

== Career ==
Çoban joined the youth academy of Stoke City at the age of 15, and played there for a couple of years before going on loan at Stockport County. He sustained heavy injuries, and moved from the academy to 1899 Hoffenheim II for more playing time. Çoban transferred to Süper Lig club Alanyaspor after a successful season with 1899 Hoffenheim II in the Regionalliga. He made his professional debut for Alanyaspor in a 3–1 loss in the league to Kasımpaşa on 12 August 2017.
