= Jannik Wanner =

German footballer (born 1999)

Personal information
- Full name: Jannik Ikendo Wanner
- Date of birth: 20 December 1999 (age 26)
- Place of birth: Port-au-Prince, Haiti
- Height: 1.73 m (5 ft 8 in)
- Position: Winger

Team information
- Current team: Livingston
- Number: 31

Youth career
- –2015: SV Amtzell
- 2015–2017: SV Weingarten
- 2017–2018: FV Ravensburg

Senior career*
Years	Team	Apps	(Gls)
2018–2020	TSV Berg	20	(3)
2020–2021	SW Bregenz		
2021	TSV Berg	6	(1)
2022–2023	FV Illertissen	44	(3)
2023–2024	SW Bregenz	30	(5)
2024–2025	SKU Amstetten	30	(9)
2025–	Livingston	1	(0)
2025	→ St Johnstone (loan)	8	(0)
- * Club domestic league appearances and goals as of 20 May 2026

Jannik Ikendo Wanner (born 20 December 1999) is a German professional footballer who plays as a winger for Scottish Championship club Livingston.

== Early life ==
Wanner was born on 20 December 1999 in Port-au-Prince, Haiti. At the age of two, he was adopted by a German family. The nephew of German footballer Klaus Wanner, he is the cousin of German footballer Paul Wanner.

== Career ==
Wanner started his career with German side TSV Berg in 2018, where he made twenty league appearances and scored three goals. Two years later, he signed for Austrian side SW Bregenz, before returning to German side TSV Berg in 2021, where he made six league appearances and scored one goal. In 2022, he signed for German side FV Illertissen, where he made forty-four league appearances and scored three goals.

Ahead of the 2023–24 season, he returned to Austrian side SW Bregenz, where he made thirty league appearances and scored five goals. Following his stint there, he signed for Austrian side SKU Amstetten, where he made thirty league appearances and scored nine goals. Austrian newspaper Kronen Zeitung wrote in 2024 that he "has become an indispensable part of the Mostviertel wing" while playing for the club. Subsequently, he signed for Scottish side Livingston in June 2025.

Wanner signed for St Johnstone on loan in September 2025.
