= 2017–18 Turkish Cup =

Ziraat Turkish Cup

Tournament details
- Country: Turkey
- Dates: 22 August 2017 - 10 May 2018
- Teams: 159

Final positions
- Champions: Akhisarspor
- Runners-up: Fenerbahçe
- Semifinalists: Beşiktaş; Galatasaray
- Europa League: Akhisarspor

Tournament statistics
- Matches played: 188
- Goals scored: 562 (2.99 per match)
- Top goal scorer: Hugo Rodallega (8)

The 2017–18 Turkish Cup (Turkish: Türkiye Kupası) was the 56th season of the tournament. Ziraat Bankası is the sponsor of the tournament; thus the official name due to sponsorship was the Ziraat Turkish Cup. As the winners of the tournament, Akhisarspor earned an automatic berth to the group stage of the 2018–19 UEFA Europa League and also qualified for the 2018 Turkish Super Cup.

== Competition format ==
Round	Total clubs remaining	Clubs involved	Winners from previous round	New entries this round	Leagues entering at this round	Notes
First round	159	42	0	42	Regional Amateur League (33 teams), Third League (newly promoted 9 teams)	single leg; no seeds
Second round	138	66	21	45	Third League (all teams except newly promoted ones)	single leg; no seeds
Third round	105	92	33	59	Second League (all teams), First League (all teams), Super League (5 teams not entering in fourth and fifth rounds)	single leg; seeding applied
Fourth round	59	54	46	8	Super League (teams ranked 5th to 13th in 2016–2017 season except 2016-2017 Turkish Cup winner)	single leg; seeding applied
Fifth round	32	32	27	5	Super League (teams ranked 1st to 4th in 2016–2017 season plus 2016-2017 Turkish Cup winner)	two legs; seeding applied
Round of 16	16	16	16	0		two legs; seeding applied
Quarter-finals	8	8	8	0		two legs; seeding applied
Semi-finals	4	4	4	0		two legs; no seeds
Final	2	2	2	0		single leg; no seeds

== First round ==
- 9 Third League and 33 Regional Amateur League teams competed in this round. No seeds were applied in the single-leg round.
- 6 teams (67%) from Third League and 15 teams (45%) from the Regional Amateur League qualified for the next round.
- 9 seeded (43%) and 12 unseeded (57%) teams qualified for the next round.
- Biggest upset was Siirt İl Özel İdare (no ranking) eliminating Mardin 47 Spor (ranked 137th).
- Lowest-ranked teams qualifying for the next round were Sinopspor, Kars 36 Spor, Siirt İl Özel İdare and Yüksekova Belediyespor (all with no ranking).
- Highest-ranked team eliminated was Yeni Orduspor (ranked 118th).

Team 1	Score	Team 2
22 August 2017
Sinopspor	4 - 2	Yeni Amasyaspor
Arsinspor	2 - 2 (3-1 p)	Yeni Orduspor
Iğdır Aras	1 - 1 (1-4 p)	Karsspor
Mardin 47 Spor	0 - 2	Siirt İl Özel İdare
Muş Spor FC	3 - 1	Dersimspor
Ağrı 1970 SK	2 - 0	62 Pertekspor
Artvin Hopaspor	3 - 1	Serhat Ardahan
Yüksekova Belediyespor	3 - 0	Tatvan Gençlerbirliği
Bartınspor	2 - 1	Türk Metal Kırıkkale
Karaköprü Belediyespor	1 - 0 (a.e.t.)	Kilis Belediyespor
Karaman Belediyespor	0 - 0 (3-4 p)	Nevşehirspor GK
Altınova Belediyespor	4 - 1	Bozüyük Vitraspor
Modafenspor	0 - 1	Edirnespor
Osmaniyespor FK	2 - 0	Adıyaman 1954 SK
Tavşanlı Linyitspor	2 - 1	Kütahyaspor
Yeni Altındağ Bld.	3 - 2 (a.e.t.)	1074 Çankırıspor
Turgutluspor	3 - 2	Utaş Uşakspor
Isparta Davrazspor	1 - 1 (6-7 p)	Bucak Bld.Oğuzhan
Kırşehir Belediyespor	0 - 1 (a.e.t.)	68 Aksaray Bld.
MKE Kırıkkalespor	0 - 3	Yozgatspor 1959 FK
Ergene Velimeşe	3 - 2 (a.e.t.)	Erokspor

== Second round ==
- 51 Third League and 15 Regional Amateur League teams competed in this round. No seeds were applied in the single-leg round.
- 29 teams (57%) from the Third League and 4 teams (27%) from the Regional Amateur League qualified for the next round.
- 18 seeded (55%) and 15 unseeded (45%) teams qualified for the next round.
- Biggest upset was Sinopspor (no ranking) eliminating Erbaaspor (ranked 79th).
- Lowest-ranked teams qualifying for the next round were Sinopspor and Kars 36 Spor (both with no ranking).
- Highest-ranked team eliminated was Aydınspor 1923 (ranked 74th).

Team 1	Score	Team 2
29 August 2017
Karsspor	1 - 0	Muş Spor FC
Ağrı 1970 SK	0 - 1	Van BBSK
Elaziz Belediyespor	2 - 5	Diyarbekirspor
Edirnespor	3 - 0	Dardanelspor
30 August 2017
Sinopspor	1 - 1 (5-4 p)	Erbaaspor
1461 Trabzon	0 - 0 (4-5 p)	Arsinspor
Ofspor	2 - 1	Yomraspor
Bayburt Grup Özel İdare	1 - 2	Pazarspor
Cizrespor	1 - 0	Yüksekova Belediyespor
Siirt İl Özel İdare	1 - 2	Batman Petrolspor
12 Bingölspor	1 - 1 (2-3 p)	24 Erzincanspor
Ankara Demirspor	2 - 2 (3-1 p)	Ankara Adliyespor
Düzcespor	1 - 0	Kocaelispor
Kayseri Erciyesspor	0 - 4	Nevşehirspor GK
Osmaniyespor FK	2 - 3 (a.e.t.)	Erzin Belediyespor
Payasspor	1 - 0	Kırıkhanspor
Yeni Altındağ Bld.	1 - 0 (a.e.t.)	Bartınspor
Yozgatspor 1959 FK	0 - 2	Çorum Belediyespor
68 Aksaray Belediyespor	0 - 1	Kozan Belediyespor
Anadolu Bağcılar SK	2 - 1	Çatalcaspor
Bayrampaşa	1 - 0 (a.e.t.)	Halide Edip Adıvar SK
Darıca Gençlerbirliği	2 - 1 (a.e.t.)	Gölcükspor
Manisa BBSK	0 - 2	Bergama Belediyespor
Orhangazi Belediyespor	1 - 0 (a.e.t)	Altınova Belediyespor
Sultanbeyli Belediyespor	2 - 1	Büyükçekmece Tepecikspor
Tavşanlı Linyitspor	0 - 2	Kızılcabölükspor
Tekirdağspor	0 - 2	Ergene Velimeşe
Tire 1922	2 - 0	Turgutluspor
Bucak Bld.Oğuzhan	1 - 2	Kemerspor 2003
Muğlaspor	1 - 0	Aydınspor 1923
Tarsus İdman Yurdu	2 - 1	Karaköprü Belediyespor
Karacabey Birlikspor	0 - 1	Yeşil Bursa
31 August 2017
Düzyurtspor	4 - 3	Artvin Hopaspor

== Third round ==
- 5 Super League, 18 First League, 36 Second League, 29 Third League and 4 Regional Amateur League teams competed in this round. Seeds were applied in the single-leg round.
- 4 teams (80%) from the Super League, 12 teams (67%) from the First League, 18 teams (50%) from the Second League, 10 teams (34%) from the Third League and 2 teams (50%) from the Regional Amateur League qualified for the next round.
- 29 seeded (63%) and 17 unseeded (37%) teams qualified for the next round.
- Biggest upset was Kars 36 Spor (no ranking) eliminating Balıkesirspor Baltok (ranked 27th).
- Lowest-ranked team qualifying for the next round was Kars 36 Spor (no ranking).
- Highest-ranked team eliminated was Göztepe (ranked 18th).

Team 1	Score	Team 2
19 September 2017
Anadolu Bağcılar SK	0 - 1	Konya Anadolu Selçukspor
Tokatspor	0 - 1 (a.e.t.)	Kahramanmaraşspor
Şanlıurfaspor	1 - 1 (4-2 p)	Pazarspor
Diyarbekirspor	0 - 1	İstanbulspor
Payasspor	1 - 3 (a.e.t.)	Amed Sportif
Menemen Belediyespor	4 - 2	Darıca Gençlerbirliği
Bandırmaspor	0 - 1	Çorum Belediyespor
Muğlaspor	1 - 1 (2-3 p)	Etimesgut Belediyespor
Bodrumspor	2 - 3 (a.e.t.)	Gazişehir Gaziantep FK
Kırklarelispor	1 - 3	Niğde Belediyespor
Van BBSK	0 - 1	Kayserispor
Balıkesirspor Baltok	1 - 1 (5-6 p)	Karsspor
Boluspor	3 - 0	Sinopspor
Mersin İdmanyurdu	3 - 5	Orhangazi Belediyespor
Kemerspor 2003	0 - 1 (a.e.t.)	Sivas Belediyespor
20 September 2017
İnegölspor	0 - 2	Yeni Malatyaspor
Düzyurtspor	4 - 4 (3-4 p)	Gümüşhanespor
Batman Petrolspor	3 - 1	Göztepe
Denizlispor	1 - 0	Düzcespor
Kozan Belediyespor	1 - 3	Adanaspor
Hacettepe Spor	1 - 2	Yeni Altındağ Bld.
Hatayspor	1 - 0	Ergene Velimeşe
Kastamonuspor 1966	1 - 3	Ofspor
Erzin Belediyespor	1 - 2	Fatih Karagümrük
Keçiörengücü	3 - 1	Silivrispor
Sancaktepe Belediyespor	2 - 4 (a.e.t.)	Elazığspor
Bergama Belediyespor	0 - 2	Sarıyer
Yeşil Bursa	3 - 1	Karşıyaka
Tuzlaspor	1 - 0	Zonguldak Kömürspor
Kocaeli Birlikspor	2 - 2 (3-5 p)	Edirnespor
Giresunspor	3 - 1	Cizrespor
Altay	0 - 0 (6-7 p)	BB Erzurumspor
Altınordu	1 - 0	Sultanbeyli Belediyespor
Bucaspor	2 - 0	Pendikspor
Manisaspor	4 - 1	Arsinspor
Gaziantepspor	0 - 3	Tire 1922
Adana Demirspor	3 - 0	Bayrampaşa
Samsunspor	3 - 3 (1-3 p)	Ankara Demirspor
Bursaspor	4 - 0	Tarsus İdman Yurdu
Fethiyespor	2 - 0	Nazilli Belediyespor
21 September 2017
24 Erzincanspor	4 - 2	Eskişehirspor
Eyüpspor	2 - 1	Sakaryaspor
Kızılcabölükspor	2 - 1	Ümraniyespor
Sivasspor	3 - 0	Bugsaş Spor
Afjet Afyonspor	2 - 0	MKE Ankaragücü
Çaykur Rizespor	3 - 0	Nevşehirspor GK

== Fourth round ==
- 12 Super League, 12 First League, 18 Second League, 10 Third League and 2 Regional Amateur League teams competed in this round. Seeds were applied in the single-leg round.
- 12 teams (100%) from the Super League, 7 teams (58%) from the First League, 4 teams (22%) from the Second League, 3 teams (30%) from the Third League and 1 team (50%) from the Regional Amateur League qualified for the next round.
- 19 seeded (70%) and 8 unseeded (30%) teams qualified for the next round.
- Biggest upset was Kars 36 Spor (no ranking) eliminating Altınordu (ranked 25th).
- Lowest-ranked team qualifying for the next round was Kars 36 Spor (no ranking).
- Highest-ranked team eliminated was Çaykur Rizespor (ranked 19th).

Team 1	Score	Team 2
24 October 2017
Sarıyer	2 - 2 (1-3 p)	Adana Demirspor
Etimesgut Belediyespor	0 - 1	Antalyaspor
Altınordu	0 - 1	Karsspor
Kasımpaşa	5 - 1	Niğde Belediyespor
Alanyaspor	2 - 0	Edirnespor
Fethiyespor	1 - 2	Adanaspor
Kahramanmaraşspor	1 - 0	Çaykur Rizespor
Akhisarspor	6 - 0	24 Erzincanspor
25 October 2017
Batman Petrolspor	2 - 1 (a.e.t.)	Denizlispor
Eyüpspor	4 - 2 (a.e.t.)	Gümüşhanespor
İstanbulspor	4 - 3 (a.e.t.)	Afjet Afyonspor
Ofspor	1 - 3	Yeni Malatyaspor
Orhangazi Belediyespor	0 - 0 (3-0 p)	Şanlıurfaspor
Çorum Belediyespor	0 - 6	Trabzonspor
Elazığspor	0 - 1	Sivas Belediyespor
Gençlerbirliği	3 - 0	Tuzlaspor
Sivasspor	3 - 1	Kızılcabölükspor
BB Erzurumspor	2 - 0	Tire 1922
Bucaspor	2 - 1	Amed Sportif
Gazişehir Gaziantep	1 - 2	Ankara Demirspor
Osmanlıspor FK	5 - 0	Fatih Karagümrük
26 October 2017
Yeni Altındağ Bld.	0 - 0 (2-4 p)	Bursaspor
Yeşil Bursa	1 - 2	Kayserispor
Konya Anadolu Selçukspor	0 - 1	Boluspor
Giresunspor	2 - 1	Menemen Belediyespor
Manisaspor	1 - 0	Hatayspor
Karabükspor	3 - 1	Keçiörengücü

== Fifth round ==
- 17 Super League, 7 First League, 4 Second League, 3 Third League and 1 Regional Amateur League teams competed in this round. Seeds were applied in the two-leg round.
- 12 teams (71%) from the Super League, 3 teams (43%) from the First League and 1 team (25%) from the Second League qualified for the next round.
- 12 seeded (75%) and 4 unseeded (25%) teams qualified for the next round.
- Biggest upset was Bucaspor (ranked 61st) eliminating Sivasspor (ranked 16th).
- Lowest-ranked team qualifying for the next round was Bucaspor (ranked 61st).
- Highest-ranked team eliminated was Kasımpaşa (ranked tenth).

=== Summary table ===
Team 1	Agg.	Team 2	1st leg	2nd leg
Adanaspor	0–4	Bursaspor	0–2	0–2
Ankara Demirspor	1–4	Akhisarspor	0–3	1–1
Batman Petrolspor	0–5	Atiker Konyaspor	0–3	0–2
BB Erzurumspor	1–9	Trabzonspor	0–4	1–5
Beşiktaş	10–1	Manisaspor	9–0	1–1
Fenerbahçe	10–1	Adana Demirspor	6–0	4–1
Galatasaray	6–3	Sivas Belediyespor	5–1	1–2
Giresunspor	6–4	Alanyaspor	4–2	2–2
Kahramanmaraşspor	1–4	İstanbul Başakşehir	1–3	0–1
Kardemir Karabükspor	2–2 (a)	İstanbulspor	2–1	0–1
Karsspor	2–4	Gençlerbirliği	1–2	1–2
Kasımpaşa	2–7	Boluspor	1–3	1–4
Kayserispor	5–2	Eyüpspor	3–2	2–0
Orhangazi Belediyespor	3–5	Antalyaspor	0–3	3–2
Osmanlıspor FK	4–2	Yeni Malatyaspor	3–1	1–1
Sivasspor	2–2 (a)	Bucaspor	2–1	0–1

=== First leg ===
28 November 2017	Karsspor	1–2	Gençlerbirliği	Kars
13:00	Akıncı 86'	Report	Duruer 51'; Muriqi 67'	Stadium: Kafkas Üniversitesi Prof. Dr. Aba Müslüm Güven

28 November 2017	Beşiktaş	9–0	Manisaspor	İstanbul
14:30	Negredo 15', 68', 80', 85'; Lens 22', 41', 72'; Çınar 32'; Pektemek 87'	Report		Stadium: Vodafone Park

28 November 2017	Ankara Demirspor	0–3	Akhisarspor	Ankara
14:45		Report	Öksüz 20' (o.g.); Hora 23'; Barbosa 68'	Stadium: TCDD Ankara Demirspor

28 November 2017	Osmanlıspor FK	3–1	Yeni Malatyaspor	Ankara
18:00	Doukara 27'; Regattin 74'; Kılıç 88'	Report	Dening 57'	Stadium: Osmanlı

28 November 2017	Galatasaray	5–1	Sivas Belediyespor	İstanbul
20:30	Öztekin 4', 76'; Başsan 70'; Gümüş 87'; Derdiyok 90'	Report	Akaydın 80'	Stadium: Türk Telekom

29 November 2017	Batman Petrolspor	0–3	Atiker Konyaspor	Batman
13:00		Report	Bora 37'; Manyama 55', 65'	Stadium: 16 Mayıs Şehir

29 November 2017	Kasımpaşa	1–3	Boluspor	İstanbul
14:30	Rangel 70'	Report	Franco 28'; Başaran 59' (pen.); Santos 83'	Stadium: Recep Tayyip Erdoğan

29 November 2017	Sivasspor	2–1	Bucaspor	Sivas
16:00	Balıkuv 63' (o.g.); Demir 90' (pen.)	Report	Fındıkcı 77'	Stadium: Yeni 4 Eylül

29 November 2017	Kardemir Karabükspor	2–1	İstanbulspor	Karabük
16:30	Seleznyov 36'; Deliktaş 45'	Report	Genişyürek 63'	Stadium: Dr. Necmettin Şeyhoğlu

29 November 2017	Adanaspor	0–2	Bursaspor	Adana
18:45		Report	Soyalp 11', 41'	Stadium: 5 Ocak Fatih Terim

29 November 2017	Fenerbahçe	6–0	Adana Demirspor	İstanbul
20:30	Potuk 23', 51', 66'; Janssen 26'; Kaldırım 45'; Köse 90' (pen.)	Report		Stadium: Ülker Şükrü Saracoğlu

30 November 2017	Orhangazi Belediyespor	0–3	Antalyaspor	Yalova
13:30		Report	Güral 49', 84' (pen.); Charles 79'	Stadium: Atatürk

30 November 2017	Giresunspor	4–2	Alanyaspor	Giresun
15:30	Öztürk 11'; Örnek 17'; Jones Carioca 19'; Dalé 53'	Report	Çoban 43'; Yalçıner 45+1'	Stadium: Atatürk

30 November 2017	Kahramanmaraşspor	1–3	İstanbul Başakşehir	Kahramanmaraş
16:30	Zorlu 45'	Report	Erdinç 23'; Kahveci 45+2'; Napoleoni 74'	Stadium: 12 Şubat

30 November 2017	BB Erzurumspor	0–4	Trabzonspor	Erzurum
19:30		Report	Rodallega 10', 27', 77'; Şahan 86'	Stadium: Kazım Karabekir

30 November 2017	Kayserispor	3–2	Eyüpspor	Kayseri
20:30	Mendes 42', 78'; Türüç 66'	Report	Tosun 61'; Arslan 87'	Stadium: Büyükşehir Belediyesi Kadir Has

=== Second leg ===
12 December 2017	Antalyaspor	2–3	Orhangazi Belediyespor	Antalya
13:30	El Kabir 25'; Güral 59' (pen.)	Report	Yüksektepe 39'; Kurt 84' (pen.); Güler 88'	Stadium: Antalya

12 December 2017	Bursaspor	2–0	Adanaspor	Bursa
15:30	Erdoğan 41' (pen.); Demir 45' (o.g.)	Report		Stadium: Büyükşehir Belediye

12 December 2017	Boluspor	4–1	Kasımpaşa	Bolu
16:30	Okutan 38', 41'; Bentley 67'; Gültekin 89'	Report	Trézéguet 22'	Stadium: Atatürk

12 December 2017	Trabzonspor	5–1	BB Erzurumspor	Trabzon
17:30	Rodallega 56', 90' (pen.); Şen 60' (pen.), 62'; Bongonda 87'	Report	Acka 53'	Stadium: Şenol Güneş Spor Kompleksi

12 December 2017	Sivas Belediyespor	2–1	Galatasaray	Sivas
19:30	Katanalp 43'; Aydın 90+1'		Gümüş 10'	Stadium: Yeni 4 Eylül

12 December 2017	Manisaspor	1–1	Beşiktaş	Manisa
21:00	Meye 53'		Özbiliz 14'	Stadium: 19 Mayıs

13 December 2017	Gençlerbirliği	2–1	Karsspor	Ankara
13:30	Özek 53'; Muriqi 62'	Report	Akbaş 90'	Stadium: 19 Mayıs

13 December 2017	Akhisarspor	1–1	Ankara Demirspor	Manisa
14:30	Adın 34'	Report	Sürmeli 7'	Stadium: 19 Mayıs

13 December 2017	Bucaspor	1–0	Sivasspor	İzmir
16:30	Balikuv 3'			Stadium: Yeni Buca

13 December 2017	Yeni Malatyaspor	1–1	Osmanlıspor FK	Malatya
17:00	Tozlu 26'		Umar 19'	Stadium: Yeni Malatya

13 December 2017	Alanyaspor	2–2	Giresunspor	Antalya
18:45	Çoban 25', 60'		Örnek 1'; Atik 63'	Stadium: Bahçeşehir Okulları

13 December 2017	Adana Demirspor	1–4	Fenerbahçe	Adana
20:30	Mendy 34'		Fernandão 24', 44'; Chahechouhe 57'; Valbuena 68'	Stadium: 5 Ocak Fatih Terim

14 December 2017	Eyüpspor	0–2	Kayserispor	İstanbul
13:30			Türüç 49'; Bia 74'	Stadium: Esenler

14 December 2017	İstanbulspor	1–0	Kardemir Karabükspor	İstanbul
14:00	Çolak 32'			Stadium: Yusuf Ziya Öniş

14 December 2017	Atiker Konyaspor	2–0	Batman Petrolspor	Konya
16:00	Evouna 61'; Güven 76'			Stadium: Büyükşehir Belediye

14 December 2017	İstanbul Başakşehir	1–0	Kahramanmaraşspor	İstanbul
20:00	Batdal 52'			Stadium: Başakşehir Fatih Terim

== Round of 16 ==
- 12 Super League, 3 First League and 1 Second League team competed in this round. Seeds were applied in the two-leg round.
- 7 teams (41%) from the Super League and 1 team (14%) from the First League qualified for the next round.
- 5 seeded (63%) and 3 unseeded (37%) teams qualified for the next round.
- Biggest upset was Giresunspor (ranked 24th) eliminating İstanbul Başakşehir (ranked second).
- Lowest-ranked team qualifying for the next round was Giresunspor (ranked 24th).
- Highest-ranked team eliminated was İstanbul Başakşehir (ranked second).

=== Qualified teams ===
- The draw for the round of 16 took place on 15 December 2017.

Seeded Teams Beşiktaş İstanbul Başakşehir Fenerbahçe Galatasaray Antalyaspor Trabzonspor Akhisarspor Gençlerbirliği	Unseeded Teams Atiker Konyaspor Osmanlıspor Bursaspor Kayserispor Boluspor Giresunspor İstanbulspor Bucaspor

=== Summary table ===
Team 1	Agg.	Team 2	1st leg	2nd leg
Atiker Konyaspor	2–1	Trabzonspor	1–0	1–1
Beşiktaş	5–3	Osmanlıspor FK	4–1	1–2
Boluspor	2–2 (a)	Akhisarspor	2–1	0–1
Fenerbahçe	3–0	İstanbulspor	2–0	1–0
Galatasaray	6–0	Bucaspor	3–0	3–0
Gençlerbirliği	2–2 (a)	Bursaspor	1–0	1–2
Giresunspor	4–3	İstanbul Başakşehir	3–1	1–2
Kayserispor	5–1	Antalyaspor	3–1	2–0

=== First leg ===
26 December 2017	Gençlerbirliği	1–0	Bursaspor	Ankara
18:30	Škuletić 24'	Report		Stadium: 19 Mayıs; Referee: Barış Şimşek

26 December 2017	Galatasaray	3–0	Bucaspor	İstanbul
20:30	İnan 14'; Gümüş 41', 43'	Report		Stadium: Türk Telekom; Referee: Ali Şansalan

27 December 2017	Giresunspor	3–1	İstanbul Başakşehir	Giresun
15:00	Dialiba 14'; Dale 65'; Korkishko 72' (pen.)	Report	Erdinç 75'	Stadium: Atatürk; Referee: Ümit Öztürk

27 December 2017	Kayserispor	3–1	Antalyaspor	Kayseri
16:30	Bulut 52'; Türüç 55'; Mendes 88'	Report	Kadah 5'	Stadium: Büyükşehir Belediyesi Kadir Has; Referee: Hüseyin Göçek

27 December 2017	Atiker Konyaspor	1–0	Trabzonspor	Konya
18:30	Çamdalı 31'	Report		Stadium: Büyükşehir Belediye; Referee: Bülent Yıldırım

27 December 2017	Fenerbahçe	2–0	İstanbulspor	İstanbul
20:30	Soldado 78', 89'	Report		Stadium: Ülker Şükrü Saracoğlu; Referee: Arda Kardeşler

28 December 2017	Boluspor	2–1	Akhisarspor	Bolu
16:30	Keleş 84' (og.); Okutan 88'	Report	Çelik 63'	Stadium: Atatürk; Referee: Suat Arslanboğa

28 December 2017	Beşiktaş	4–1	Osmanlıspor FK	İstanbul
20:30	Vršajević 15' (og.); Negredo 35'; Tosun 50'; Quaresma 90+3'	Report	Doukara 72'	Stadium: Vodafone Park; Referee: Alper Ulusoy

=== Second leg ===
16 January 2018	Bursaspor	2–1	Gençlerbirliği	Bursa
16:00	Agu 33'; Erdoğan 49'	Report	Škuletić 19'	Stadium: Büyükşehir Belediye; Referee: Serkan Çınar

16 January 2018	Trabzonspor	1–1	Atiker Konyaspor	Trabzon
18:00	Rodallega 80'	Report	Şahiner 24'	Stadium: Şenol Güneş Spor Kompleksi; Referee: Özgür Yankaya

16 January 2018	İstanbulspor	0–1	Fenerbahçe	İstanbul
20:30		Report	Giuliano 89'	Stadium: Atatürk Olimpiyat; Referee: Bahattin Şimşek

17 January 2018	Akhisarspor	1–0	Boluspor	Manisa
14:30	Seleznyov 39' (pen.)	Report		Stadium: 19 Mayıs; Referee: Mustafa Öğretmenoğlu

17 January 2018	İstanbul Başakşehir	2–1	Giresunspor	İstanbul
18:00	Adebayor 13'; Attamah 78'	Report	Demir 25'	Stadium: 3. İstanbul Başakşehir Fatih Terim; Referee: Suat Arslanboğa

17 January 2018	Osmanlıspor FK	2–1	Beşiktaş	Ankara
20:30	Cikalleshi 86', 88' (pen.)	Report	Pektemek 83'	Stadium: Osmanlı; Referee: Koray Gençerler

18 January 2018	Antalyaspor	0–2	Kayserispor	Antalya
18:00		Report	William 30'; Boldrin 80'	Stadium: Antalya; Referee: Halil Umut Meler

18 January 2018	Bucaspor	0–3	Galatasaray	İzmir
20:30		Report	Gomis 33'; Öztekin 44'; Feghouli 53'	Stadium: Yeni Buca; Referee: Serkan Tokat

== Bracket ==
Quarter-Finals
1	Akhisarspor	1	2	3
8	Kayserispor	0	2	2
4	Atiker Konyaspor	2	1	3
5	Galatasaray	2	4	6
2	Beşiktaş	3	1	4
7	Gençlerbirliği	1	0	1
3	Giresunspor	1	1	2
6	Fenerbahçe	2	2	4

Semi-Finals
Akhisarspor	1	2	3
Galatasaray	2	0	2
Beşiktaş	2	0	2
Fenerbahçe	2	3	5

Final
Akhisarspor	3
Fenerbahçe	2

== Quarter-finals ==
- Seven Super League and one First League team competed in this round. Seeds were applied in the two-leg round.

=== Qualified teams ===
- The draw for the quarter-finals and following rounds took place on January 19, 2018.

Seeded Teams Beşiktaş Fenerbahçe Galatasaray Akhisarspor	Unseeded Teams Gençlerbirliği Atiker Konyaspor Kayserispor Giresunspor

=== Summary table ===
Team 1	Agg.	Team 2	1st leg	2nd leg
Akhisarspor	3–2	Kayserispor	1–0	2–2
Atiker Konyaspor	3–6	Galatasaray	2–2	1–4
Beşiktaş	4–1	Gençlerbirliği	3–1	1–0
Giresunspor	2–4	Fenerbahçe	1–2	1–2

=== First leg ===
30 January 2018	Beşiktaş	3–1	Gençlerbirliği	İstanbul
20:30	Pektemek 21'; Negredo 74' (pen.); Talisca 79'	Report	Yılmaz 53'	Stadium: Vodafone Park; Referee: Serkan Çınar

31 January 2018	Akhisarspor	1–0	Kayserispor	Manisa
18:30	Ataseven 89'	Report		Stadium: Spor Toto Akhisar; Referee: Özgür Yankaya

31 January 2018	Giresunspor	1–2	Fenerbahçe	Giresun
20:30	Carioca 73'	Report	Topal 23'; Fernandão 90+4' (pen.)	Stadium: Atatürk; Referee: Yaşar Kemal Uğurlu

1 February 2018	Atiker Konyaspor	2–2	Galatasaray	Konya
20:30	Linnes 40' (o.g.); Jahović 90+1'		Gümüş 50'; Aziz 55'	Stadium: Büyükşehir Belediye

=== Second leg ===
6 February 2018	Gençlerbirliği	0–1	Beşiktaş	Ankara
20:30		Report	Pektemek 25'	Stadium: 19 Mayıs; Referee: Özgür Yankaya

7 February 2018	Kayserispor	2–2	Akhisarspor	Kayseri
18:30	Kravets 36'; Gyan 90' (pen.)	Report	Aydoğdu 25'; Ataseven 69'	Stadium: Büyükşehir Belediyesi Kadir Has; Referee: Halis Özkahya

7 February 2018	Fenerbahçe	2–1	Giresunspor	İstanbul
20:30	Karakoç 18'; Chahechouhe 37'	Report	Dialiba 13'	Stadium: Ülker Şükrü Saracoğlu; Referee: Koray Gençerler

8 February 2018	Galatasaray	4–1	Atiker Konyaspor	İstanbul
20:30	Aziz 17'; Gomis 52', 88'; Rodrigues 90+1'	Report	Fofana 14'	Stadium: Türk Telekom; Referee: Ümit Öztürk

== Semi-finals ==
=== Summary table ===
Team 1	Agg.	Team 2	1st leg	2nd leg
Akhisarspor	3–2	Galatasaray	1–2	2–0
Beşiktaş	2–5	Fenerbahçe	2–2	0–3

=== First leg ===
27 February 2018	Akhisarspor	1–2	Galatasaray	Manisa
20:30	Seleznyov 19'	Report	Çalık 21'; Gümüş 88'	Stadium: Spor Toto Akhisar; Referee: Yaşar Kemal Uğurlu

1 March 2018	Beşiktaş	2–2	Fenerbahçe	İstanbul
20:30	Negredo 14'; Talisca 82'	Report	Soldado 17'; Özbayraklı 45'	Stadium: Vodafone Park; Referee: Firat Aydinus

=== Second leg ===
18 April 2018	Galatasaray	0–2	Akhisarspor	İstanbul
20:30		Report	Seleznyov 4', 35'	Stadium: Türk Telekom; Referee: Barış Şimşek

19 April and 3 May 2018	Fenerbahçe	Walkover win	Beşiktaş	İstanbul
20:30		Report		Stadium: Ülker Şükrü Saracoğlu; Referee: Mete Kalkavan

- Fenerbahçe awarded the Tie after Beşiktaş refused to return to the field following an incident in the original game where manager Şenol Güneş was struck on the head with an object, forcing the match to be abandoned. The TFF ordered the remaining 32 minutes to be played behind closed doors, however Beşiktaş refused to travel and after a rejected appeal, did not appear for the rescheduled game. As a result, Beşiktaş were punished by forfeiting all prize money from the competition to the point, and barred from entering the 2018-19 contest.

== Final ==
The final was contested in Diyarbakır as a one-off match. The winning club was awarded a total of 75 medals, along with the Turkish Cup trophy.

10 May 2018
20:30 TRT (UTC+3:00)
Final

Akhisarspor	3–2	Fenerbahçe
Lopes 32'; Sissoko 70'; Barbosa 81'	Report	Fernandão 56'; Souza 86'

Diyarbakır Stadium, Diyarbakır
Referee: Cüneyt Çakır

Akhisarspor player Muğdat Çelik was selected man of the match.

== Top goalscorers ==
Rank	Player	Club	Goals
1	(Colombia) Hugo Rodallega	Trabzonspor	8
2	(Spain) Álvaro Negredo	Beşiktaş	7
3	(Turkey) Sinan Gümüş	Galatasaray	6
4	(Ukraine) Yevhen Seleznyov	Akhisarspor	5
5	(Turkey) Deniz Türüç	Kayserispor	4
5	(Turkey) Mustafa Pektemek	Beşiktaş	4
5	(Turkey) Hasan Kaya	Ankara Demirspor	4
5	(Romania) Ioan Hora	Akhisarspor	4
5	(Brazil) Fernandão	Fenerbahçe	4
5	(Turkey) Mustafa Eskihellaç	Düzyurtspor	4
