= Akhisarspor =

Turkish football club

- Full name: Akhisarspor Kulübü
- Nickname: Akigo
- Short name: Akhisar S.K.
- Founded: 8 April 1970; 56 years ago
- Ground: Spor Toto Akhisar Stadium
- Capacity: 12,139
- President: Evren Özbey
- Manager: Theofanis Gekas
- League: Turkish Regional Amateur League
- 2024–25: Withdrew from the league
- Website: https://www.akhisarspor.net/
Home colours	Away colours	Third colours

Akhisarspor Kulübü (lit. 'Akhisar Sports Club'), commonly known as Akhisarspor, is a Turkish professional football club located in the city of Akhisar. Formed in 1970, Akhisarspor are nicknamed Akigo. The club has a fierce rivalry with Turgutluspor and Manisaspor.

Akhisarspor had their first major success in 2012 when they won the TFF First League and as a result were promoted to the Süper Lig. On 10 May 2018, Akhisarspor won their first professional trophy, the 2017–18 Turkish Cup. On 5 August 2018, they won the Turkish Super Cup by beating Galatasaray on penalties.

== History ==
Akhisarspor was founded in 1970 by the merger of three football teams, Güneşspor, Gençlikspor and Doğanspor in Manisa. Yılmaz Atabarut was the founder and the first president of Akhisar Belediyespor.

The club competed in the Turkish regional amateur series until 1984, when it was promoted to the TFF Third League, the fourth level in the Turkish football league system. Ten years later, in 1994, they were relegated back to the regional amateur league for one season.

In 1995, Akhisarspor was promoted back to the third league. In the 2000–2001 season, they advanced to the TFF Second League and after nine years there, they were promoted to the TFF First League. They became the champion of the league in their second season which brought them to the highest level of Turkish football, the Süper Lig.

In 2012, Akhisarspor brought in Bruno Mezenga, Çağdaş Atan and Ibrahima Sonko to strengthen their squad. In January 2013, they signed Greek striker Theofanis "Fanis" Gekas who went on to score 12 goals for the remainder of the 2012–13 season, and assisted in the effort to keep the club in the division. Akhisarspor ended on a 14th place in the Süper Lig.

In the 2016–17 season, Akhisarspor finished in 7th place on the table, which is the highest position they've been in throughout their history.

On 10 May 2018, Akhisarspor won the Turkish Cup, their first title in their history. This qualified them to the UEFA Europa League for the first time.

== Stadium ==
Akhisarspor played at the Akhisar Şehir Stadium before being promoted to the Süper Lig in 2012. However, the Akhisar Şehir Stadium was not fit for the standards of the league. Consequently, the club had to ground-share with Manisaspor and use the Manisa 19 Mayis Stadium from 2012 to 2017. The stadium was officially opened in 1974 and was renovated in 2008.

In 2014, the construction of Akhisarspor's new and very own stadium was started. It is called the Spor Toto Akhisar Stadium, and is located in Akhisar.

=== Stadium history ===
#	Stadium	Years	Capacity
1	Akhisar Şehir Stadium	1970–2012	5,000
2	Manisa 19 Mayıs Stadium	2012–2017	16,597
3	Spor Toto Akhisar Stadium	2018–present	12,139

== Colours and crest ==
Akhisar's original home colours.

=== Colours ===
The official colours of Akhisarspor are green and black, but the team also use the yellow colour. These three colours represent Güneşspor, Gençlikspor and Doğanspor, respectively. As a fourth colour, the club uses white. Nike has been the kit manufacturer of the team since 2012.

=== Crest ===
On the crest of the team you can find the three colours of Akhisarspor. You can also see a ball with wings. The ball is white coloured and the wings are yellow coloured. Above and under the ball you can read the words 'Akhisar' in green and 'Spor' with a black background. Under Spor, we can read '1970' also in black.

== League participations ==
- Süper Lig: 2012–2019
- 1. Lig: 2010–2012, 2019–2021
- 2. Lig: 2008–2010, 2021–2022
- 3. Lig: 1984–1994, 1995–2008, 2022–2024
- Amateur Level: 1970–1984, 1994–1995, 2024–

== Recent seasons ==
Season	League									Cup	Super Cup	Europe	
Season	Division	Pos	Pld	W	D	L	GF	GA	Pts	Cup	Super Cup	Competition	Round
2007–08	3. Lig	↑ 2nd	32	17	10	5	45	24	61				
2008–09	2. Lig	5th	36	10	16	10	62	70	46	First round			
2009–10	2. Lig	↑ 2nd	36	21	10	5	64	32	73				
2010–11	1. Lig	14th	32	8	9	15	27	39	33	First round			
2011–12	1. Lig	↑ 1st	34	17	12	5	46	28	63	Third round			
2012–13	Süper Lig	14th	34	11	9	14	36	44	42	Third round			
2013–14	Süper Lig	10th	34	12	8	14	44	55	44	Group stage			
2014–15	Süper Lig	12th	34	9	11	14	41	51	38	Group stage			
2015–16	Super Lig	8th	34	11	13	10	42	41	46	Quarter-finals			
2016–17	Süper Lig	7th	34	14	6	14	46	42	48	Quarter-finals			
2017–18	Süper Lig	11th	34	11	9	14	44	53	42	Winners			
2018–19	Süper Lig	↓ 18th	34	6	9	19	33	54	27	Runners-up	Winners	Europa League	Group stage
2019–20	1. Lig	4th	34	16	9	9	46	39	57	Third round	Runners-up		
2020–21	1. Lig	↓ 16th	34	8	6	20	36	59	30	Third round			
2021–22	2. Lig	↓ 16th	34	8	7	19	34	56	31	Fourth round			

== Honours ==
=== Domestic ===
==== League ====
- TFF First League
  - Winners (1): 2011–12
- TFF Second League
  - Runners-up (1): 2009–10
- TFF Third League
  - Runners-up (1): 2007–08

==== Cups ====
- Turkish Cup
  - Winners (1): 2017–18
  - Runners-up (1): 2018–19
- Turkish Super Cup
  - Winners (1): 2018
  - Runners-up (1): 2019

== European record ==
As of 13 December 2018

Competition	P	W	D	L	GF	GA	GD
UEFA Europa League	6	0	1	5	4	14	–10
Total	6	0	1	5	4	14	–10

P = Matches played; W = Matches won; D = Matches drawn; L = Matches lost; GF = Goals for; GA = Goals against; GD = Goals difference.

=== List of matches ===
Note: Akhisar score always listed first.

Season	Competition	Round	Opponent	Home	Away	Agg.
2018–19	UEFA Europa League	Group Stage (Group J)	(Spain) Sevilla	2–3	0–6	4th out of 4
2018–19	UEFA Europa League	Group Stage (Group J)	(Russia) Krasnodar	0–1	1–2	4th out of 4
2018–19	UEFA Europa League	Group Stage (Group J)	(Belgium) Standard Liège	0–0	1–2	4th out of 4

UEFA ranking history:

As of 21 June 2023

Season	Rank	Points	Ref.
2019	159 ▲	6.920	
2020	170 ▼	6.720	
2021	182 ▼	6.020	
2022	248 ▼	5.420	
2023	206 ▲	6.420	

== Players ==
=== Current squad ===
As of 8 September 2022

Note: Flags indicate national team as defined under FIFA eligibility rules; some limited exceptions apply. Players may hold more than one non-FIFA nationality.

No.	Pos.	Nation	Player
1	GK	TUR	Halil Yeral
6	MF	TUR	Enes Tayfun
7	FW	TUR	Serkan Sefil
8	MF	TUR	Yavuz Özbakan
9	FW	TUR	Mert Efe Çölbeyi
11	MF	TUR	Salih Yiğit
17	MF	TUR	Bora Yılmaz
18	FW	TUR	Oğuzcan Kesgin
20	MF	TUR	Halil İbrahim Karavuş
22	DF	TUR	Semih Görer
23	DF	TUR	Furkan Korkut
26	GK	TUR	Batuhan Ataç

No.	Pos.	Nation	Player
27	DF	TUR	Gökmen Aydoğdu
35	DF	TUR	Yusuf Acer
47	MF	TUR	Yusuf Kanal
54	GK	TUR	Emircan Seçgin
55	MF	TUR	Fırat Yiğit Öztürk
57	FW	TUR	Bekir Akın
70	DF	TUR	Göksu Mutlu
74	MF	TUR	Orçun Erten
77	FW	TUR	Turhan Kaya
87	DF	TUR	Yiğit Efe Düztaş
88	DF	TUR	Recep Kutun

=== Other players under contract ===
Note: Flags indicate national team as defined under FIFA eligibility rules; some limited exceptions apply. Players may hold more than one non-FIFA nationality.

No.	Pos.	Nation	Player
—	GK	TUR	Enes Kimia

== Personnel ==
As of 29 January 2020

Position	Staff
Manager	(Turkey) Yılmaz Vural
Assistant	(Turkey) Recep Umut
Assistant	(Turkey) Ülken Durak
Assistant	(Turkey) Toprak Kırtoğlu
Goalkeeping coach	(Turkey) Metin Akçevre

== Notable managers ==
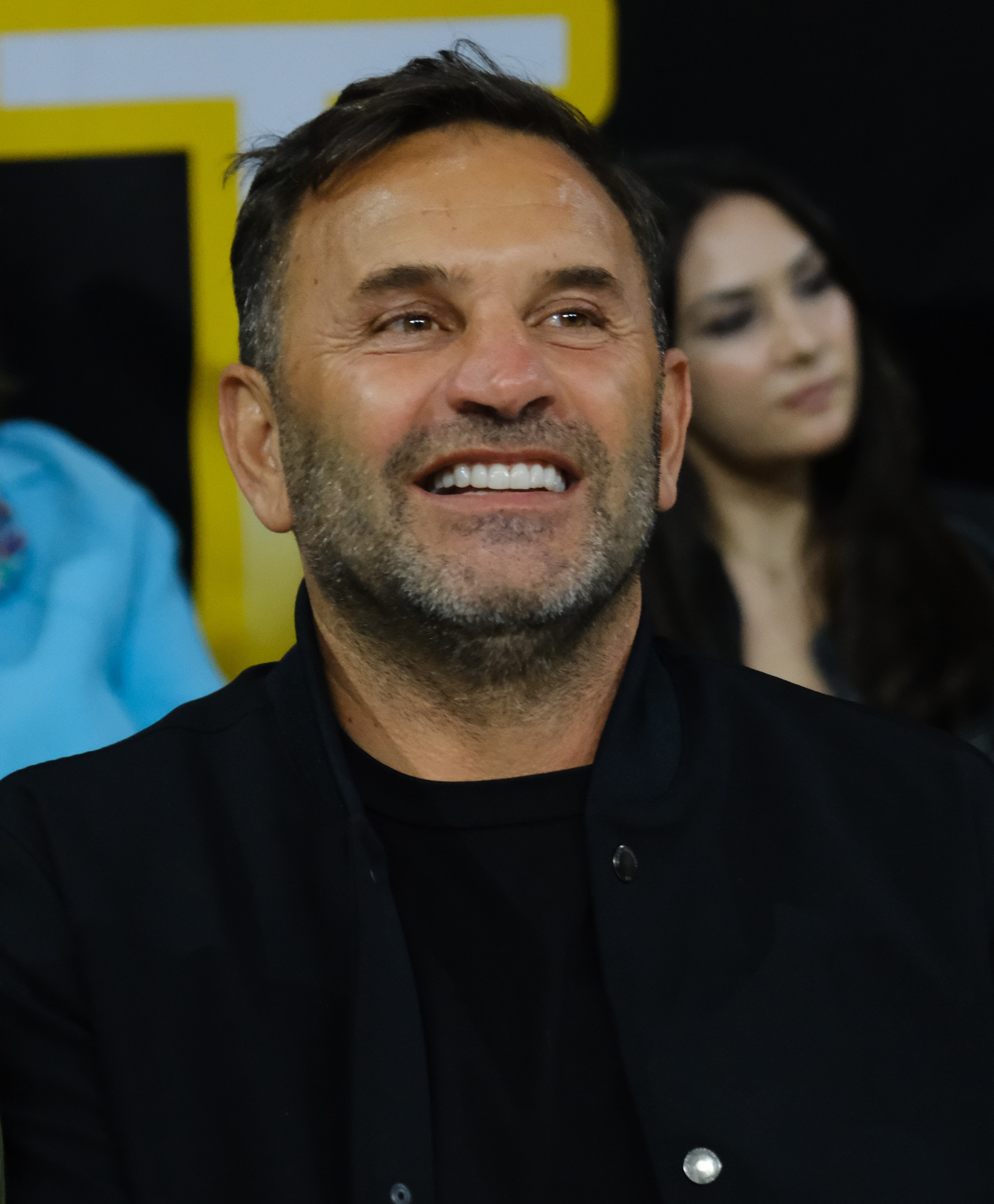
Okan Buruk won the 2017–18 Turkish Cup with Akhisarspor.

Dates	Name	Honours
2011–2014	(Turkey) Hamza Hamzaoğlu	2011–12 TFF First League
2017–2018	(Turkey) Okan Buruk	2017–18 Turkish Cup
2018	(Bosnia and Herzegovina) Safet Sušić	2018 Turkish Super Cup
