= 2017–18 Süper Lig =

60th season of top-tier Turkish football

Süper Lig
- Season: 2017–18
- Dates: 11 August 2017 – 19 May 2018
- Champions: Galatasaray; 21st title
- Relegated: Karabükspor; Gençlerbirliği; Osmanlıspor
- Champions League: Galatasaray; Fenerbahçe
- Europa League: İstanbul Başakşehir; Beşiktaş; Akhisarspor
- Matches: 306
- Goals: 906 (2.96 per match)
- Top goalscorer: Bafétimbi Gomis (29 goals)
- Biggest home win: İstanbul Başakşehir 5–0 Karabükspor (29 January 2018); Beşiktaş 5–0 Karabükspor (10 February 2018); Galatasaray 5–0 Bursaspor (23 February 2018); Göztepe 5–0 Karabükspor (27 April 2018)
- Biggest away win: Karabükspor 0-7 Galatasaray (3 March 2018); Karabükspor 0–7 Fenerbahçe (14 May 2018)
- Highest scoring: Trabzonspor 3–4 Alanyaspor (22 September 2017); Trabzonspor 1–6 Akhisar (15 October 2017); Karabükspor 0–7 Galatasaray (3 March 2018); Karabükspor 0–7 Fenerbahçe (14 May 2018)
- Longest winning run: Fenerbahçe (8 matches)
- Longest unbeaten run: Fenerbahçe (15 matches)
- Longest winless run: Akhisar Belediyespor (14 matches)
- Longest losing run: Karabükspor (12 matches)
- Highest attendance: 50,291; Galatasaray 0–0 Fenerbahçe; 22 October 2017

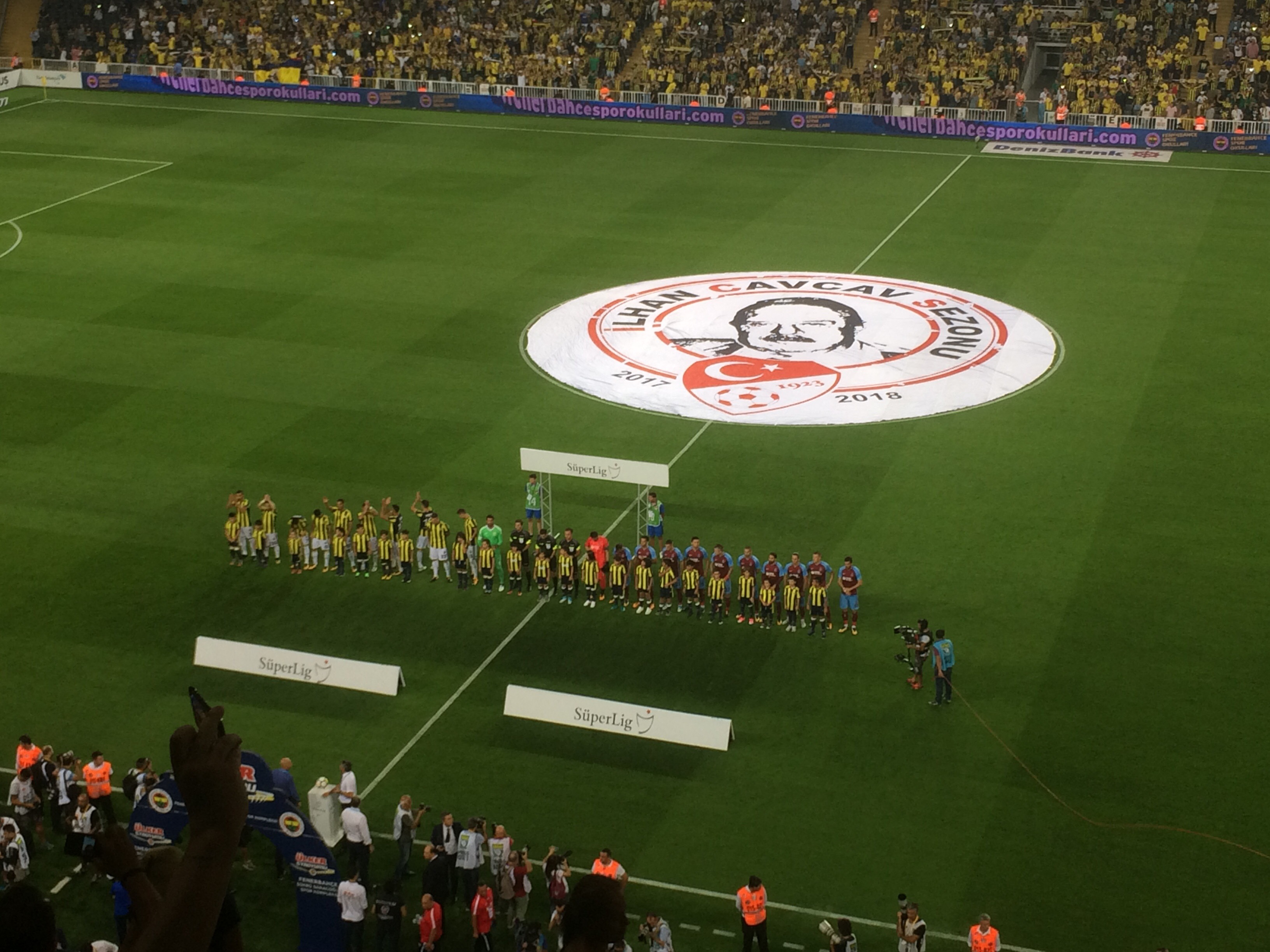
2017-18 2. day Fenerbahçe-Trabzonspor pre-match

The 2017–18 Süper Lig, officially called the Spor Toto Süper Lig İlhan Cavcav season, was the 60th season of the Süper Lig, the highest tier football league of Turkey. The season was named after İlhan Cavcav, the longtime chairman of Gençlerbirliği S.K.

== Teams ==
- Sivasspor, Yeni Malatyaspor and Göztepe achieved promotion from 2016–17 TFF First League. Sivasspor made an immediate return, whereas Yeni Malatyaspor promoted to the top level for the first time in their history. Finally, Göztepe defeated Eskişehirspor in the play-off final.
- Çaykur Rizespor, Gaziantepspor and Adanaspor were relegated to 2017–18 TFF First League.

=== Stadia and locations ===
Location of teams in 2017–18 Süper Lig
Istanbul Süper Lig football clubs

Team	Home city	Stadium	Capacity
Akhisar Belediyespor	Akhisar	Spor Toto Akhisar Stadium	12,139
Alanyaspor	Alanya	Alanya Oba Stadium	10,842
Antalyaspor	Antalya	Antalya Stadium	33,032
Beşiktaş	Istanbul (Beşiktaş)	Vodafone Park	43,500
Bursaspor	Bursa	Timsah Arena	43,877
Fenerbahçe	Istanbul (Kadıköy)	Ülker Stadium	50,509
Galatasaray	Istanbul (Şişli)	Türk Telekom Stadium	52,652
Gençlerbirliği	Ankara (Ulus)	Ankara 19 Mayıs Stadium	19,209
Göztepe	İzmir	Bornova Stadium	12,500
İstanbul Başakşehir	Istanbul (Başakşehir)	Başakşehir Fatih Terim Stadium	17,801
Kardemir Karabükspor	Karabük	Dr. Necmettin Şeyhoğlu Stadium	14,200
Kasımpaşa	Istanbul (Beyoğlu)	Recep Tayyip Erdoğan Stadium	14,234
Kayserispor	Kayseri	Kadir Has Stadium	32,864
Konyaspor	Konya	Konya Büyükşehir Stadium	42,276
Osmanlıspor	Ankara (Sincan)	Osmanlı Stadyumu	19,626
Sivasspor	Sivas	Sivas Arena	27,532
Trabzonspor	Trabzon	Şenol Güneş Sports Complex	40,782
Yeni Malatyaspor	Malatya	Malatya Arena	27,044

=== Personnel and sponsorship ===
Team	Head coach	Captain	Kit manufacturer	Sponsor
Akhisar Belediyespor	(Turkey) Okan Buruk	(Turkey) Caner Osmanpaşa	Nike	
Alanyaspor	(Turkey) Mesut Bakkal	(Turkey) Haydar Yılmaz	Kappa	TAV Airports
Antalyaspor	(Turkey) Hamza Hamzaoğlu	Vacant	Nike	IATI
Atiker Konyaspor	(Turkey) Sergen Yalçın	(Germany) Ali Çamdalı	Hummel	Spor Toto
Beşiktaş	(Turkey) Şenol Güneş	(Turkey) Tolga Zengin	Adidas	Vodafone
Bursaspor	(Turkey) Mustafa Er	(Argentina) Pablo Batalla	Puma	Warmhaus
Fenerbahçe	(Turkey) Aykut Kocaman	(Turkey) Volkan Demirel	Adidas	
Galatasaray	(Turkey) Fatih Terim	(Turkey) Selçuk İnan	Nike	Nef
Gençlerbirliği	(Turkey) Ümit Özat	(Turkey) Uğur Çiftçi	Lotto	ARTE
Göztepe	(Turkey) Tamer Tuna	(Turkey) Selçuk Şahin	Lotto	
İstanbul Başakşehir	(Turkey) Abdullah Avcı	(Turkey) Emre Belözoğlu	Nike	Makro
Kardemir Karabükspor	(Turkey) Ünal Karaman	(Turkey) Ahmet Şahin	Adidas	Kardemir
Kasımpaşa	(Turkey) Kemal Özdeş	(Turkey) Veysel Sari	Nike	
Kayserispor	(Romania) Marius Șumudică	(Turkey) Umut Bulut	Adidas	İstikbal
Osmanlıspor	(Turkey) İrfan Buz	(Turkey) Numan Çürüksu	Nike	ATG
Sivasspor	(Turkey) Samet Aybaba	(Turkey) Ziya Erdal	Adidas	Demir İnşaat
Trabzonspor	(Turkey) Rıza Çalımbay	(Turkey) Onur Kıvrak	Nike	QNB
Yeni Malatyaspor	(Turkey) Erol Bulut	(Turkey) Yalçın Ayhan	Adidas	Battalbey

=== Managerial changes ===
Team	Outgoing manager	Manner of departure	Date of vacancy	Position in table	Replaced by	Date of appointment
Gençlerbirliği	(Turkey) Ümit Özat	Mutual agreement	30 August 2017	18th	(Turkey) Mesut Bakkal	31 August 2017
Yeni Malatyaspor	(Turkey) Ertuğrul Sağlam	Resigned	14 September 2017	13th	(Turkey) Erol Bulut	27 September 2017
Osmanlıspor	(Turkey) Bülent Uygun	Resigned	17 September 2017	18th	(Turkey) İrfan Buz	20 September 2017
Antalyaspor	(Turkey) Rıza Çalımbay	Resigned	18 September 2017	16th	(Brazil) Leonardo Araújo	27 September 2017
Kardemir Karabükspor	(Turkey) Erkan Sözeri	Resigned	1 October 2017	16th	(Australia) Tony Popovic	1 October 2017
Trabzonspor	(Turkey) Ersun Yanal	Sacked	15 October 2017	11th	(Turkey) Rıza Çalımbay	18 October 2017
Gençlerbirliği	(Turkey) Mesut Bakkal	Sacked	20 November 2017	18th	(Turkey) Ümit Özat	20 November 2017
Antalyaspor	(Brazil) Leonardo Araújo	Resigned	6 December 2017	17th	(Spain) David Badía (caretaker)	6 December 2017
Kardemir Karabükspor	(Australia) Tony Popovic	Sacked	15 December 2017	18th	(Turkey) Levent Açıkgöz	18 December 2017
Galatasaray	(Croatia) Igor Tudor	Sacked	18 December 2017	2nd	(Turkey) Fatih Terim	21 December 2017
Alanyaspor	(Bosnia and Herzegovina) Safet Sušić	Sacked	26 December 2017	13th	(Turkey) Hikmet Karaman	3 January 2018
Antalyaspor	(Spain) David Badía	End of caretaker tenure	4 January 2018	15th	(Turkey) Hamza Hamzaoğlu	4 January 2018
Alanyaspor	(Turkey) Hikmet Karaman	Sacked	26 February 2018	16th	(Turkey) Mesut Bakkal	27 February 2018
Konyaspor	(Turkey) Mehmet Özdilek	Mutual agreement	4 March 2018	16th	(Turkey) Sergen Yalçın	6 March 2018
Kardemir Karabükspor	(Turkey) Levent Açıkgöz	Sacked	21 March 2018	18th	(Turkey) Ünal Karaman	21 March 2018
Bursaspor	(France) Paul Le Guen	Sacked	10 April 2018	13th	(Turkey) Mustafa Er	10 April 2018

=== Foreign players ===
Club	Player 1	Player 2	Player 3	Player 4	Player 5	Player 6	Player 7	Player 8	Player 9	Player 10	Player 11	Player 12	Player 13	Player 14	Former Players
Akhisarspor	(Belgium) Geoffrey Bia	(Brazil) Paulo Henrique	(Brazil) Serginho	(Cameroon) Dany Nounkeu	(Mali) Abdoul Sissoko	(Netherlands) Marvin Emnes	(Portugal) Hélder Barbosa	(Portugal) Miguel Lopes	(Serbia) Milan Lukač	(Sweden) Daniel Larsson	(Ukraine) Yevhen Seleznyov				(Montenegro) Petar Grbić (Romania) Ioan Hora
Alanyaspor	(Argentina) Lucas Villafáñez	(Brazil) Douglas	(Brazil) Filipe Augusto	(Brazil) Wánderson	(Brazil) Welinton	(Cameroon) Mbilla Etame	(Chile) Junior Fernandes	(Democratic Republic of the Congo) Fabrice Nsakala	(Ghana) Isaac Sackey	(Greece) Georgios Tzavellas	(Greece) Giannis Maniatis	(Guinea) Guy-Michel Landel	(Mali) Mamadou Fofana	(Senegal) Lamine Gassama	(Brazil) Vágner Love (France) Rémy Riou (Serbia) Darko Lazić (Zambia) Chisamba Lungu
Antalyaspor	(Belgium) Ruud Boffin	(Brazil) Charles	(Brazil) Chico	(Brazil) Danilo	(Brazil) Diego Ângelo	(Brazil) Maicon	(Czech Republic) Ondřej Čelůstka	(France) Souleymane Doukara	(France) William Vainqueur	(Serbia) Milan Jevtović	(Switzerland) Johan Djourou				(Brazil) Sandro (Cameroon) Samuel Eto'o (France) Jérémy Ménez (France) Samir Nasri (Morocco) Moestafa El Kabir
Beşiktaş	(Brazil) Adriano	(Brazil) Talisca	(Brazil) Vágner Love	(Canada) Atiba Hutchinson	(Canada) Cyle Larin	(Chile) Gary Medel	(Croatia) Domagoj Vida	(Netherlands) Jeremain Lens	(Netherlands) Ryan Babel	(Portugal) Pepe	(Portugal) Ricardo Quaresma	(Serbia) Duško Tošić	(Spain) Álvaro Negredo	(Spain) Fabricio	(Croatia) Matej Mitrović (Germany) Andreas Beck
Bursaspor	(Argentina) Pablo Batalla	(Aruba) Joshua John	(Brazil) Titi	(Democratic Republic of the Congo) Jirès Kembo Ekoko	(Ghana) Emmanuel Badu	(Nigeria) Mikel Agu	(Nigeria) Shehu Abdullahi	(Nigeria) William Troost-Ekong	(Republic of the Congo) Dzon Delarge	(Romania) Bogdan Stancu	(Romania) Gheorghe Grozav	(Senegal) Moussa Sow	(Senegal) Ricardo Faty	(Trinidad and Tobago) John Bostock	(Chile) Cristóbal Jorquera (Ghana) Kofi Atta (Nigeria) Paschal Okoli
Fenerbahçe	(Brazil) Fernandão	(Brazil) Giuliano	(Brazil) Souza	(Cameroon) Carlos Kameni	(Chile) Mauricio Isla	(France) Mathieu Valbuena	(Morocco) Aatif Chahechouhe	(Morocco) Nabil Dirar	(Netherlands) Vincent Janssen	(Portugal) Luís Neto	(Russia) Roman Neustädter	(Slovakia) Martin Škrtel	(Spain) Roberto Soldado		(Netherlands) Robin van Persie
Galatasaray	(Algeria) Sofiane Feghouli	(Belgium) Jason Denayer	(Brazil) Fernando	(Brazil) Maicon	(Brazil) Mariano	(Cape Verde) Garry Rodrigues	(France) Bafétimbi Gomis	(France) Cédric Carrasso	(Japan) Yuto Nagatomo	(Morocco) Younès Belhanda	(Netherlands) Ryan Donk	(Norway) Martin Linnes	(Romania) Iasmin Latovlevici	(Uruguay) Fernando Muslera	(Senegal) Badou Ndiaye
Gençlerbirliği	(Belarus) Sergey Politevich	(Benin) Stéphane Sessègnon	(Brazil) Jaílton Paraíba	(Brazil) Luccas Claro	(Ghana) Kamal Issah	(Guinea) Florentin Pogba	(Mauritania) Diallo Guidileye	(Montenegro) Aleksandar Šćekić	(Netherlands) Elvis Manu	(Serbia) Marko Milinković	(Serbia) Petar Škuletić	(Sweden) Abdul Khalili	(Sweden) Johannes Hopf		(Kosovo) Vedat Muriqi (Senegal) Ousmane N'Diaye (South Africa) Tokelo Rantie
Göztepe	(Algeria) Nabil Ghilas	(Argentina) Óscar Scarione	(Brazil) Kadu	(Brazil) Wallace	(France) Axel Ngando	(France) Léo Schwechlen	(France) Yoan Gouffran	(Gabon) André Poko	(Ivory Coast) Adama Traoré	(Portugal) André Castro	(Portugal) Beto	(Senegal) Demba Ba	(Serbia) Miloš Kosanović	(Slovenia) Rajko Rotman	(France) Mathieu Peybernes (North Macedonia) Adis Jahović (Togo) Prince Segbefia
İstanbul Başakşehir	(Bosnia and Herzegovina) Edin Višća	(Bosnia and Herzegovina) Riad Bajić	(Brazil) Júnior Caiçara	(Brazil) Márcio Mossoró	(Cameroon) Aurélien Chedjou	(France) Gaël Clichy	(Ghana) Joseph Attamah	(Italy) Stefano Napoleoni	(Moldova) Alexandru Epureanu	(Morocco) Manuel da Costa	(Netherlands) Eljero Elia	(Togo) Emmanuel Adebayor			(Albania) Sokol Cikalleshi
Karabükspor	(Argentina) Luis Ibáñez	(Brazil) Leandrinho	(Democratic Republic of the Congo) Hervé Kage	(Iceland) Ólafur Ingi Skúlason	(Mali) Hamidou Traoré	(Romania) Marius Alexe	(Sweden) Adam Ståhl	(Ukraine) Andriy Bliznichenko	(Ukraine) Anton Kravchenko	(Ukraine) Oleksandr Rybka					(Cameroon) Dany Nounkeu (Gabon) André Poko (Mali) Mustapha Yatabaré (Romania) Cristian Tănase (Romania) Gabriel Torje (Romania) Gheorghe Grozav (Romania) Paul Papp (Romania) Valerică Găman (Ukraine) Yevhen Seleznyov
Kasımpaşa	(Bulgaria) Strahil Popov	(Cameroon) Franck Etoundi	(Czech Republic) David Pavelka	(Egypt) Trézéguet	(France) Olivier Veigneau	(Germany) Markus Neumayr	(Ghana) Bernard Mensah	(Guinea) Bengali-Fodé Koita	(Kosovo) Loret Sadiku	(Nigeria) Kenneth Omeruo	(Nigeria) Samuel Eduok	(Senegal) Mbaye Diagne	(Tunisia) Syam Ben Youssef	(Venezuela) Jhon Murillo	(Colombia) Michael Rangel
Kayserispor	(Brazil) Fernando Boldrin	(Brazil) William de Amorim	(Cape Verde) Ryan Mendes	(Chile) Gonzalo Espinoza	(Cameroon) Jean-Armel Kana-Biyik	(Ghana) Asamoah Gyan	(Portugal) Tiago Lopes	(Portugal) Varela	(Romania) Cristian Săpunaru	(Romania) Silviu Lung Jr.	(Senegal) Stéphane Badji	(Serbia) Nikola Stojiljković	(Ukraine) Artem Kravets	(Ukraine) Oleksandr Kucher	(Belgium) Geoffrey Bia (Serbia) Dejan Meleg
Konyaspor	(Bosnia and Herzegovina) Amir Hadžiahmetović	(Bosnia and Herzegovina) Deni Milošević	(Cameroon) Samuel Eto'o	(Democratic Republic of the Congo) Wilfred Moke	(Denmark) Jens Jønsson	(France) Mehdi Bourabia	(Gabon) Malick Evouna	(Germany) Petar Filipović	(Ivory Coast) Moryké Fofana	(Mali) Mustapha Yatabaré	(North Macedonia) Adis Jahović	(Slovenia) Nejc Skubic	(South Africa) Lebogang Manyama	(Sweden) Patrik Carlgren	(Burkina Faso) Abdou Traoré (Nigeria) Imoh Ezekiel (Nigeria) Patrick Friday Eze
Osmanlıspor	(Albania) Sokol Cikalleshi	(Belgium) Tortol Lumanza	(Bosnia and Herzegovina) Avdija Vršajević	(Brazil) Luíz Carlos	(Denmark) Andreas Maxsø	(Iran) Payam Sadeghian	(Lithuania) Žydrūnas Karčemarskas	(Morocco) Adrien Regattin	(Nigeria) Aminu Umar	(Nigeria) Raheem Lawal	(Portugal) Tiago Pinto				(Czech Republic) Václav Procházka (Liberia) Tonia Tisdell (Mauritania) Souleymane Doukara (Portugal) Josué (Republic of the Congo) Thievy Bifouma (Slovakia) Branislav Niňaj
Sivasspor	(Algeria) Carl Medjani	(Brazil) Auremir	(Brazil) Robinho	(Ghana) John Boye	(Ivory Coast) Arouna Koné	(Ivory Coast) Cyriac	(Republic of the Congo) Delvin N'Dinga	(Republic of the Congo) Thievy Bifouma	(Romania) Paul Papp	(Russia) Vitali Dyakov	(Senegal) Henri Saivet	(Sweden) Mattias Bjärsmyr	(Ukraine) Serhiy Rybalka	(Uruguay) Sergio Rochet	(Brazil) Leandrinho (Nigeria) Elderson Echiéjilé
Trabzonspor	(Argentina) José Sosa	(Colombia) Fabián Castillo	(Colombia) Hugo Rodallega	(Costa Rica) Esteban Alvarado	(Czech Republic) Filip Novák	(Nigeria) Ogenyi Onazi	(Portugal) João Pereira	(Senegal) Dame N'Doye	(Slovakia) Ján Ďurica	(Slovakia) Juraj Kucka	(Slovakia) Matúš Bero	(Slovakia) Tomáš Hubočan			(Argentina) Emmanuel Mas (Democratic Republic of the Congo) Théo Bongonda
Yeni Malatyaspor	(Argentina) Emanuel Dening	(Benin) Fabien Farnolle	(Brazil) Dória	(Brazil) Gilberto	(Ecuador) Arturo Mina	(France) Aly Cissokho	(France) Michaël Pereira	(Guinea) Sadio Diallo	(Morocco) Issam Chebake	(Morocco) Khalid Boutaïb	(Netherlands) Nacer Barazite	(Nigeria) Azubuike Okechukwu	(Nigeria) Seth Sincere	(Senegal) Issiar Dia	(Nigeria) Sunday Mba (Togo) Jonathan Ayité

== League table ==
Pos	Team	Pld	W	D	L	GF	GA	GD	Pts	Qualification or relegation
1	Galatasaray (C)	34	24	3	7	75	33	+42	75	Qualification for the Champions League group stage
2	Fenerbahçe	34	21	9	4	78	36	+42	72 (Note: Fenerbahçe ahead of Başakşehir on head-to-head goal difference: Fenerbahçe 2–3 Başakşehir, Başakşehir 0–2 Fenerbahçe.)	Qualification for the Champions League third qualifying round
3	Başakşehir	34	22	6	6	62	34	+28	72	Qualification for the Europa League third qualifying round
4	Beşiktaş	34	21	8	5	69	30	+39	71	Qualification for the Europa League second qualifying round
5	Trabzonspor	34	15	10	9	63	51	+12	55	
6	Göztepe	34	13	10	11	49	50	−1	49 (Note: Göztepe ahead of Sivasspor on head-to-head points: Göztepe 6 pts, Sivasspor 0 pts.)	
7	Sivasspor	34	14	7	13	45	53	−8	49	
8	Kasımpaşa	34	13	7	14	57	58	−1	46	
9	Kayserispor	34	12	8	14	44	55	−11	44	
10	Yeni Malatyaspor	34	11	10	13	38	45	−7	43	
11	Akhisarspor	34	11	9	14	44	53	−9	42	Qualification for the Europa League group stage (Note: Akhisarspor qualified for the Europa League group stage by winning the 2017–18 Turkish Cup.)
12	Alanyaspor	34	11	7	16	55	59	−4	40	
13	Bursaspor	34	11	6	17	43	48	−5	39	
14	Antalyaspor	34	10	8	16	40	59	−19	38	
15	Konyaspor	34	9	9	16	38	42	−4	36	
16	Osmanlıspor (R)	34	8	9	17	49	60	−11	33 (Note: Osmanlıspor ahead of Gençlerbirliği on head-to-head points: Osmanlıspor 6 pts, Gençlerbirliği 0 pts.)	Relegation to TFF First League
17	Gençlerbirliği (R)	34	8	9	17	37	54	−17	33	Relegation to TFF First League
18	Kardemir Karabükspor (R)	34	3	3	28	20	86	−66	12	Relegation to TFF First League

Source: Süper Lig, Soccerway
Rules for classification: 1) Points; 2) Head-to-head points; 3) Head-to-head goal difference; 4) Head-to-head goals scored; 5) Goal difference; 6) Goals scored; 7) Play-off.
(C) Champions; (R) Relegated

== Results ==
Home \ Away	AKH	ALN	ANT	BAŞ	BEŞ	BUR	FEN	GAL	GEN	GÖZ	KAR	KSM	KAY	KON	OSM	SİV	TRA	MLT
Akhisar Belediyespor	—	0–4	1–1	1–2	0–3	1–0	1–0	1–2	3–3	1–1	2–1	2–1	0–2	3–0	2–1	1–0	1–3	0–0
Alanyaspor	3–1	—	3–2	4–1	1–2	3–1	1–4	2–3	4–1	1–1	1–1	1–3	1–2	1–2	1–1	1–1	1–2	1–0
Antalyaspor	2–2	3–1	—	0–2	1–2	2–0	0–1	1–1	1–1	1–3	2–1	2–1	2–1	0–0	3–0	1–4	1–2	3–1
İstanbul Başakşehir	2–1	2–1	4–1	—	1–0	1–0	0–2	5–1	1–1	2–0	5–0	3–2	3–1	2–1	1–0	1–1	2–2	1–0
Beşiktaş	0–0	1–0	2–0	1–1	—	2–1	3–1	3–0	1–0	5–1	5–0	2–1	2–0	2–0	5–1	5–1	2–2	3–1
Bursaspor	3–0	3–2	4–0	0–3	2–2	—	0–1	1–2	1–1	0–0	2–1	0–1	1–0	2–1	3–1	1–0	1–3	0–0
Fenerbahçe	2–3	3–0	4–1	2–3	2–1	2–1	—	0–0	2–2	2–1	2–0	4–2	3–3	3–2	2–0	4–1	2–2	3–1
Galatasaray	4–2	2–0	3–0	2–0	2–0	5–0	0–0	—	5–1	3–1	3–2	2–0	4–1	2–1	2–0	3–0	2–1	2–0
Gençlerbirliği	1–1	0–1	0–1	1–0	2–1	1–0	1–2	1–0	—	3–0	1–1	0–0	1–2	2–1	0–3	4–0	0–0	0–1
Göztepe	2–0	3–3	2–1	1–2	1–3	2–1	2–2	0–1	3–2	—	5–0	0–2	1–1	1–0	3–3	1–0	3–2	0–0
Kardemir Karabükspor	0–3	1–0	1–2	3–1	0–1	1–4	0–7	0–7	0–2	0–1	—	0–2	1–0	0–1	0–4	0–1	1–1	2–4
Kasımpaşa	2–0	3–2	2–3	1–2	2–2	2–2	1–4	2–1	3–1	3–1	2–0	—	1–1	2–1	1–1	2–3	0–3	3–2
Kayserispor	1–2	1–2	2–0	1–1	1–1	3–1	0–5	1–3	3–2	1–0	3–2	3–2	—	2–1	2–2	1–1	0–0	0–1
Konyaspor	2–0	0–2	1–1	1–1	1–1	0–3	1–1	0–2	3–0	1–1	2–0	2–0	2–0	—	1–0	5–0	2–2	0–1
Osmanlıspor	3–2	3–0	0–0	1–4	2–3	2–1	1–1	1–3	2–0	0–2	3–0	3–0	0–1	0–0	—	2–4	3–3	0–0
Sivasspor	1–1	2–2	3–1	1–0	2–1	0–0	1–2	2–1	1–0	2–3	1–0	2–2	0–2	2–1	3–2	—	1–2	2–0
Trabzonspor	1–6	3–4	3–0	0–1	0–2	1–0	1–1	2–1	3–1	0–0	3–0	2–5	4–0	2–1	4–3	0–2	—	4–1
Yeni Malatyaspor	0–0	1–1	1–1	0–2	0–0	2–4	0–2	2–1	4–1	2–3	3–1	1–1	3–2	1–1	3–1	1–0	1–0	—

Source: Turkish Football Federation (in Turkish)
Legend: Blue = home team win; Yellow = draw; Red = away team win.

== Positions by round ==
The following table represents the teams' positions after each round in the competition.

Team ╲ Round	1	2	3	4	5	6	7	8	9	10	11	12	13	14	15	16	17	18	19	20	21	22	23	24	25	26	27	28	29	30	31	32	33	34
Galatasaray	1	1	1	1	1	1	1	1	1	1	1	1	1	2	1	3	2	2	2	2	1	2	1	1	1	1	1	2	1	1	1	1	1	1
Fenerbahçe	8	13	6	11	8	4	7	5	6	8	7	5	3	3	3	2	3	3	3	3	3	3	4	4	4	4	4	4	4	4	3	2	2	2
İstanbul Başakşehir	7	11	4	3	5	6	5	4	5	2	2	2	2	1	2	1	1	1	1	1	2	1	2	2	3	2	2	1	3	3	2	3	3	3
Beşiktaş	4	3	2	2	2	2	2	6	7	3	3	3	4	4	4	4	4	4	4	4	4	4	3	3	2	3	3	3	2	2	4	4	4	4
Trabzonspor	5	5	8	5	9	9	9	11	13	11	12	11	8	8	7	7	7	5	5	6	6	7	6	7	6	5	5	5	5	5	5	5	5	5
Göztepe A.Ş.	9	14	9	6	3	3	4	2	2	5	8	8	7	7	6	6	6	7	7	7	7	8	7	8	7	7	8	8	7	6	6	6	6	6
Sivasspor	14	8	14	16	11	15	11	9	9	9	5	6	9	10	9	9	8	8	8	8	8	6	8	6	8	8	6	7	8	7	7	7	7	7
Kasımpaşa	2	2	7	4	10	10	13	14	14	13	13	12	10	11	11	11	11	11	11	11	11	9	11	12	11	12	10	9	9	9	9	9	8	8
Kayserispor	18	12	11	7	4	5	3	7	4	4	4	4	5	5	5	5	5	6	6	5	5	5	5	5	5	6	7	6	6	8	8	8	9	9
Yeni Malatyaspor	3	10	10	13	14	11	12	13	11	10	11	13	13	13	13	10	10	10	9	10	9	10	9	9	9	10	9	10	10	10	11	10	10	10
Akhisar Belediyespor	6	6	3	8	6	7	6	3	3	6	9	9	11	9	10	12	12	12	13	14	12	12	10	10	10	9	11	11	12	12	12	14	12	11
Alanyaspor	15	17	16	12	13	12	8	10	10	12	10	10	12	12	12	13	13	13	12	12	14	16	15	15	13	13	14	14	14	15	13	13	14	12
Bursaspor	13	9	13	9	7	8	10	8	8	7	6	7	6	6	8	8	9	9	10	9	10	11	12	11	12	11	12	13	13	11	10	11	11	13
Antalyaspor	17	15	15	15	16	13	15	17	12	15	14	14	14	14	16	16	15	16	16	15	15	14	14	14	15	14	13	12	11	13	14	12	13	14
Konyaspor	12	7	12	14	15	14	14	15	17	14	15	15	15	16	15	14	16	17	17	17	16	15	16	16	17	17	17	16	16	14	15	15	15	15
Osmanlıspor	16	18	17	17	18	18	17	18	18	18	17	17	16	15	14	15	14	14	15	16	17	17	17	17	16	15	15	17	17	16	16	16	16	16
Gençlerbirliği	10	16	18	18	17	17	18	16	16	17	18	18	18	17	17	17	17	15	14	13	13	13	13	13	14	16	16	15	15	17	17	17	17	17
Kardemir Karabükspor	11	4	5	10	12	16	16	12	15	16	16	16	17	18	18	18	18	18	18	18	18	18	18	18	18	18	18	18	18	18	18	18	18	18

Leader and 2018–19 Champions League group stage
2018–19 UEFA Champions League second qualifying round
2018–19 UEFA Europa League third qualifying round
2018–19 UEFA Europa League second qualifying round
Relegation to 2018–19 TFF First League

Source: tff.org (in Turkish)

== Statistics ==
=== Top goalscorers ===
"Süper Lig Top Goalscorers". TFF.

Pos.	Player	Team	Goals
1	(France) Bafétimbi Gomis	Galatasaray	29
2	(Turkey) Burak Yılmaz	Trabzonspor	23
3	(North Macedonia) Adis Jahović	Konyaspor	19
4	(Togo) Emmanuel Adebayor	İstanbul Başakşehir	15
5	(Brazil) Talisca	Beşiktaş	14
5	(Turkey) Emre Akbaba	Alanyaspor	14
5	(Turkey) Umut Bulut	Kayserispor	14
5	(Brazil) Giuliano	Fenerbahçe	14
9	(Ivory Coast) Arouna Koné	Sivasspor	13
9	(Egypt) Trézéguet	Kasımpaşa	13
9	(Netherlands) Ryan Babel	Beşiktaş	13
9	(Brazil) Vágner Love	Beşiktaş	13

=== Hat-tricks ===
As of 19 May 2018

Date	Player	For	Against	Result
22 September 2017	(Brazil) Vágner Love	Alanyaspor	Trabzonspor	3–4
24 September 2017	(North Macedonia) Adis Jahović	Göztepe	Sivasspor	2–3
30 September 2017	(Turkey) Hakan Arslan	Sivasspor	Antalyaspor	3–1
18 November 2017	(Togo) Emmanuel Adebayor	İstanbul Başakşehir	Galatasaray	5–1
19 November 2017	(Spain) Roberto Soldado	Fenerbahçe	Sivasspor	4–1
17 December 2017	(Netherlands) Ryan Babel	Beşiktaş	Osmanlıspor	5–1
23 February 2018	(France) Bafétimbi Gomis	Galatasaray	Bursaspor	5–0
3 March 2018	(France) Bafétimbi Gomis^{4}	Galatasaray	Kardemir Karabükspor	0–7
12 May 2018	(Senegal) Mbaye Diagne	Kasımpaşa	Gençlerbirliği	3–1
19 May 2018	(Canada) Cyle Larin	Beşiktaş	Sivasspor	5–1

Note

^{4} Player scored 4 goals

== Awards ==
=== Annual awards ===
Award	Winner	Club
Player of the Season	(France) Bafétimbi Gomis	Galatasaray
Goalkeeper of the Season	(Uruguay) Fernando Muslera	Galatasaray
Defender of the Season	(Portugal) Pepe	Beşiktaş
Midfielder of the Season	(Turkey) Emre Belözoğlu	Başakşehir
Forward of the Season	(France) Bafétimbi Gomis	Galatasaray
Manager of the Season	(Turkey) Fatih Terim	Galatasaray

Team of the Season
Goalkeeper	(Uruguay) Fernando Muslera (Galatasaray)			
Defence	(Brazil) Mariano (Galatasaray)	(Portugal) Pepe (Beşiktaş)	(Slovakia) Martin Škrtel (Fenerbahçe)	(Brazil) Adriano (Beşiktaş)
Midfield	(Bosnia and Herzegovina) Edin Višća (Başakşehir)	(Brazil) Talisca (Beşiktaş)	(Turkey) Emre Belözoğlu (Başakşehir)	(Cape Verde) Garry Rodrigues (Galatasaray)
Attack	(France) Bafétimbi Gomis (Galatasaray)		(Turkey) Burak Yılmaz (Trabzonspor)	

== Attendances ==
No.	Club	Average attendance	Change	Highest
1	Galatasaray	40,778	91,0%	—
2	Beşiktaş	29,562	-2,9%	—
3	Fenerbahçe	29,035	76,1%	—
4	Bursaspor	20,723	28,7%	—
5	Trabzonspor	20,128	16,7%	—
6	Antalyaspor	14,554	15,1%	—
7	Konyaspor	12,151	-22,7%	—
8	Kayserispor	10,894	97,2%	—
9	Sivasspor	10,414	—	—
10	Yeni Malatya	9,410	—	—
11	Göztepe	6,775	—	—
12	Akhisarspor	5,795	131,7%	—
13	Alanyaspor	5,415	19,2%	—
14	İstanbul Başakşehir	5,112	59,4%	—
15	Karabükspor	3,554	-19,6%	—
16	Gençlerbirliği	3,262	24,3%	—
17	Kasımpaşa	2,450	73,0%	—
18	Osmanlıspor	1,718	-54,7%	—

== See also ==
- 2017–18 Turkish Cup
- 2017–18 TFF First League
- 2017–18 TFF Second League
- 2017–18 TFF Third League
