= 2016–17 Süper Lig =

59th season of top-tier Turkish football

Süper Lig
- Season: 2016–17
- Champions: Beşiktaş (15th title)
- Relegated: Adanaspor; Gaziantepspor; Rizespor
- Champions League: Beşiktaş; İstanbul Başakşehir
- Europa League: Fenerbahçe; Galatasaray; Konyaspor
- Matches: 306
- Goals: 829 (2.71 per match)
- Top goalscorer: Vágner Love (Alanyaspor) (23 goals)
- Biggest home win: Galatasaray 6–0 Akhisar Bld. (28 January 2017); Çaykur Rizespor 6–0 Bursaspor (7 May 2017); Akhisar Bld. 6–0 Gaziantepspor (8 May 2017)
- Biggest away win: Alanyaspor 0–5 Başakşehir (2 October 2016); Bursaspor 0–5 Galatasaray (1 May 2017)
- Highest scoring: Alanyaspor 4–3 Gaziantepspor (5 November 2016); Kayserispor 3–4 Gaziantepspor (18 March 2017); Trabzonspor 3–4 Beşiktaş (8 April 2017)
- Longest winning run: Akhisar Bld. (6 matches)
- Longest unbeaten run: Başakşehir (17 matches)
- Longest winless run: Adanaspor, Gaziantepspor (9 matches)
- Longest losing run: Gaziantepspor (9 matches)
- Highest attendance: 44,594; Fenerbahçe - Galatasaray (20 November 2016)

The 2016–17 Süper Lig, officially called the Spor Toto Süper Lig Turgay Şeren season, was the 59th season of the Süper Lig, the highest tier football league of Turkey.

The season was named after Turgay Şeren, a legendary goalkeeper of the Turkey national team who also played for and coached Galatasaray.

Beşiktaş clinched their 15th league title on May 28, 2017 with a 4-0 win against Gaziantepspor away with 1 week to spare. With this championship, Beşiktaş was entitled to wear the third star on its logo.

== Teams ==
- Adanaspor, Karabükspor and Alanyaspor achieved promotion from 2015–16 TFF First League. Karabükspor made an immediate return, whereas Adanaspor returned to the top level after 12 years in lower leagues. Finally Alanyaspor defeated Adana Demirspor in the play-off final for a debut season at top flight level. Also, for the first time Antalya Province will have 2 teams in Süper Lig.
- Sivasspor, Eskişehirspor and Mersin İdman Yurdu were relegated to 2016–17 TFF First League. Sivasspor ended an 11-year stint in the top level, while Eskişehirspor and Mersin İdmanyurdu were relegated after 8 years and 2 years in the top flight, respectively.

=== Stadia and locations ===
Location of teams in 2016–17 Süper Lig
Istanbul Süper Lig football clubs

Team	Home city	Stadium	Capacity
Adanaspor	Adana	KozArena	36,117
Akhisar Belediyespor	Akhisar	Manisa 19 Mayıs Stadium	16,597
Antalyaspor	Antalya	Antalya Arena	33,032
Konyaspor	Konya	Konya Büyükşehir Stadium	42,276
Alanyaspor	Alanya	Bahçeşehir Okulları Arena	10,842
Beşiktaş	Istanbul (Beşiktaş)	Vodafone Park	43,500
Bursaspor	Bursa	Timsah Arena	43,877
Çaykur Rizespor	Rize	Yeni Rize Şehir Stadı	15,558
Fenerbahçe	Istanbul (Kadıköy)	Ülker Stadium	50,509
Galatasaray	Istanbul (Şişli)	Türk Telekom Arena	52,652
Gaziantepspor	Gaziantep	Gaziantep Arena	35,558
Gençlerbirliği	Ankara	Ankara 19 Mayıs Stadium	19,209
Karabükspor	Karabük	Dr. Necmettin Şeyhoğlu Stadium	14,200
Kasımpaşa	Istanbul (Beyoğlu)	Recep Tayyip Erdoğan Stadium	14,234
Kayserispor	Kayseri	Kadir Has Stadium	32,864
İstanbul Başakşehir	Istanbul (Başakşehir)	Başakşehir Fatih Terim Stadium	17,801
Osmanlıspor	Ankara	Osmanlı Stadyumu	19,626
Trabzonspor	Trabzon	Şenol Güneş Sports Complex	40,782

=== Personnel and sponsorship ===
Team	Head coach	Captain	Kit manufacturer	Sponsor
Adanaspor	(Turkey) Eyüp Arın	(Turkey) Bekir Yılmaz	Lotto	Spor Toto
Akhisar Belediyespor	(Turkey) Okan Buruk	(Portugal) Custódio	Nike	
Antalyaspor	(Turkey) Rıza Çalımbay	(Cameroon) Samuel Eto'o	Nike	IATI
Alanyaspor	(Bosnia and Herzegovina) Safet Sušić	(Turkey) Haydar Yılmaz	Kappa	TAV Airports
Beşiktaş	(Turkey) Şenol Güneş	(Turkey) Tolga Zengin	Adidas	Vodafone
Bursaspor	(Turkey) Mutlu Topçu	(Argentina) Pablo Batalla	Puma	Warmhaus
Çaykur Rizespor	(Turkey) Hikmet Karaman	(Cameroon) Léonard Kweuke	Nike	Çaykur
Fenerbahçe	(Netherlands) Dick Advocaat	(Turkey) Volkan Demirel	Adidas	Nesine.com
Galatasaray	(Croatia) Igor Tudor	(Turkey) Selçuk İnan	Nike	Nef
Gaziantepspor	(Turkey) Bülent Uygun	(Turkey) Elyasa Süme	Adidas	Mahmood Coffee
Gençlerbirliği	(Turkey) Ümit Özat	(Turkey) Selçuk Şahin	Lotto	ARTE
Karabükspor	(Austria) Zoran Barisic	(Turkey) Ahmet Şahin	Adidas	Kardemir
Kasımpaşa	(Turkey) Kemal Özdeş	(Turkey) Adem Büyük	Nike	Halley
Kayserispor	(Turkey) Mesut Bakkal	(Democratic Republic of the Congo) Larrys Mabiala	Adidas	İstikbal
Konyaspor	(Turkey) Aykut Kocaman	(Germany) Ali Çamdalı	Hummel	Spor Toto
İstanbul Başakşehir	(Turkey) Abdullah Avcı	(Turkey) Emre Belözoğlu	Nike	Makro
Osmanlıspor	(Turkey) Hamza Hamzaoğlu	(Germany) Erdal Kılıçaslan	Nike	ATG
Trabzonspor	(Turkey) Ersun Yanal	(Turkey) Onur Recep Kıvrak	Nike	QNB

=== Managerial changes ===
Team	Outgoing manager	Manner of departure	Date of vacancy	Position in table	Replaced by	Date of appointment
Trabzonspor	(Turkey) Hami Mandıralı	Sacked	13 May 2016	Last season	(Turkey) Ersun Yanal	17 May 2016
Gaziantepspor	(Turkey) Sergen Yalçın	Contract expired	30 May 2016	Pre-season	(Turkey) İsmail Kartal	21 July 2016
Karabükspor	(Turkey) Yücel İldiz	Contract expired	3 June 2016	Pre-season	(Croatia) Igor Tudor	18 June 2016
Fenerbahçe	(Portugal) Vítor Pereira	Sacked	11 August 2016	Pre-season	(Netherlands) Dick Advocaat	17 August 2016
Adanaspor	(Turkey) Engin İpekoğlu	Mutual agreement	18 August 2016	Pre-season	(Croatia) Krunoslav Jurčić	28 August 2016
Akhisar Belediyespor	(Turkey) Cihat Arslan	Mutual agreement	1 September 2016	7th	(Turkey) Tolunay Kafkas	4 September 2016
Kasımpaşa	(Turkey) Rıza Çalımbay	Sacked	13 September 2016	18th	(Turkey) Kemal Özdeş	16 September 2016
Antalyaspor	(Portugal) José Morais	Mutual agreement	6 October 2016	18th	(Turkey) Rıza Çalımbay	7 October 2016
Gençlerbirliği	(Turkey) İbrahim Üzülmez	Mutual agreement	7 November 2016	9th	(Turkey) Ümit Özat	7 November 2016
Adanaspor	(Croatia) Krunoslav Jurčić	Sacked	5 December 2016	18th	(Turkey) Levent Şahin	23 December 2016
Gaziantepspor	(Turkey) İsmail Kartal	Sacked	5 December 2016	15th	(Turkey) İbrahim Üzülmez	12 December 2016
Kayserispor	(Turkey) Hakan Kutlu	Resigned	6 December 2016	17th	(Turkey) Sergen Yalçın	4 January 2017
Alanyaspor	(Turkey) Hüseyin Kalpar	Resigned	16 January 2017	14th	(Bosnia and Herzegovina) Safet Sušić	27 January 2017
Bursaspor	(Turkey) Hamza Hamzaoğlu	Sacked	21 January 2017	6th	(Turkey) Mutlu Topçu	30 January 2017
Gaziantepspor	(Turkey) İbrahim Üzülmez	Mutual agreement	24 January 2017	18th	(Turkey) Bülent Uygun	24 January 2017
Galatasaray	(Netherlands) Jan Olde Riekerink	Sacked	15 February 2017	3rd	(Croatia) Igor Tudor	15 February 2017
Karabükspor	(Croatia) Igor Tudor	Signed by Galatasaray	15 February 2017	10th	(Austria) Zoran Barisic	17 February 2017
Osmanlıspor	(Turkey) Mustafa Reşit Akçay	Resigned	18 March 2017	12th	(Turkey) Hamza Hamzaoğlu	22 March 2017
Akhisar Belediyespor	(Turkey) Tolunay Kafkas	Resigned	18 March 2017	15th	(Turkey) Okan Buruk	23 March 2017
Adanaspor	(Turkey) Levent Şahin	Resigned	9 April 2017	18th	(Turkey) Eyüp Arın	10 April 2017
Kayserispor	(Turkey) Sergen Yalçın	Resigned	22 April 2017	15th	(Turkey) Mesut Bakkal	24 April 2017

=== Foreign players ===
Club	Player 1	Player 2	Player 3	Player 4	Player 5	Player 6	Player 7	Player 8	Player 9	Player 10	Player 11	Player 12	Player 13	Player 14	Former Players
Adanaspor	(Bosnia and Herzegovina) Goran Karačić	(Brazil) Didi	(Brazil) Digão	(Brazil) Maurício Ramos	(Brazil) Renan Diniz	(Brazil) Renan Foguinho	(Brazil) Reynaldo	(Brazil) Roni	(Brazil) Vinícius	(Cameroon) Charles Itandje	(France) Magaye Gueye	(Hungary) Vladimir Koman	(Ivory Coast) Ousmane Viera		(Brazil) Edgar
Akhisarspor Belediyespor	(Albania) Sokol Cikalleshi	(Democratic Republic of the Congo) Jeremy Bokila	(Ghana) Enoch Kofi Adu	(Mali) Abdoul Sissoko	(Portugal) Custódio	(Portugal) Miguel Lopes	(Portugal) Ricardo Vaz Tê	(Serbia) Milan Lukač	(Slovenia) Miral Samardžić	(Sweden) Daniel Larsson					(Brazil) Douglão (Cameroon) Landry Nguémo (Colombia) Hugo Rodallega (Guinea-Bissau) Sami
Alanyaspor	(Brazil) Vágner Love	(Chile) Junior Fernandes	(Czech Republic) Zdeněk Zlámal	(Democratic Republic of the Congo) Fabrice Nsakala	(Ghana) Isaac Sackey	(Ghana) Nuru Sulley	(Greece) Georgios Tzavellas	(Guinea) Guy-Michel Landel	(Haiti) Wilde-Donald Guerrier	(Netherlands) Glynor Plet	(Nigeria) Kenneth Omeruo	(Portugal) Daniel Candeias	(Senegal) Lamine Gassama	(Serbia) Darko Lazić	(Iran) Sajjad Shahbazzadeh (Morocco) Ismaïl Aissati (Senegal) Abdoulaye Ba (Spain) Carlos García (Togo) Jonathan Ayité
Antalyaspor	(Brazil) Charles	(Brazil) Chico	(Brazil) Danilo	(Brazil) Diego Ângelo	(Brazil) Ramon Motta	(Brazil) Sandro	(Cameroon) Jean Makoun	(Cameroon) Mbilla Etame	(Cameroon) Samuel Eto'o	(Czech Republic) Ondřej Čelůstka	(Ivory Coast) Jean Armel Drolé	(Liberia) Amadaiya Rennie	(Morocco) Moestafa El Kabir	(Slovenia) Sašo Fornezzi	(Bosnia and Herzegovina) Kenan Horić (Ghana) Samuel Inkoom (Serbia) Milan Jevtović
Beşiktaş	(Brazil) Adriano	(Brazil) Marcelo	(Brazil) Rhodolfo	(Brazil) Talisca	(Cameroon) Vincent Aboubakar	(Canada) Atiba Hutchinson	(Croatia) Matej Mitrović	(Germany) Andreas Beck	(Netherlands) Ryan Babel	(Portugal) Ricardo Quaresma	(Senegal) Demba Ba	(Serbia) Duško Tošić	(Spain) Fabricio		
Bursaspor	(Argentina) Pablo Batalla	(Aruba) Joshua John	(Chile) Cristóbal Jorquera	(Czech Republic) Tomáš Sivok	(Romania) Bogdan Stancu	(Senegal) Ricardo Faty	(Slovenia) Boban Jović	(Venezuela) Yonathan Del Valle							(Czech Republic) Tomáš Necid (Senegal) Vieux Sané
Çaykur Rizespor	(Austria) Jakob Jantscher	(Cameroon) Léonard Kweuke	(Iraq) Ali Faez	(Iraq) Dhurgham Ismail	(Italy) Davide Petrucci	(Morocco) Marwane Saâdane	(Nigeria) Bright Edomwonyi	(Nigeria) Godfrey Oboabona	(Nigeria) Nosa Igiebor	(Poland) Patryk Tuszyński	(Senegal) Abdoulaye Diallo	(Slovenia) Matic Fink	(Tunisia) Mohamed Ali Yacoubi		(Nigeria) Iyayi Atiemwen
Fenerbahçe	(Brazil) Fabiano	(Brazil) Fernandão	(Brazil) Souza	(Denmark) Simon Kjær	(Morocco) Aatif Chahechouhe	(Netherlands) Gregory van der Wiel	(Netherlands) Jeremain Lens	(Netherlands) Robin van Persie	(Nigeria) Emmanuel Emenike	(Russia) Roman Neustädter	(Senegal) Moussa Sow	(Slovakia) Martin Škrtel	(Slovakia) Miroslav Stoch	(Ukraine) Oleksandr Karavayev	
Galatasaray	(Belgium) Luis Pedro Cavanda	(Cameroon) Aurélien Chedjou	(Cape Verde) Garry Rodrigues	(France) Lionel Carole	(Germany) Lukas Podolski	(Netherlands) Nigel de Jong	(Netherlands) Wesley Sneijder	(Norway) Martin Linnes	(Portugal) Bruma	(Portugal) Josué	(Uruguay) Fernando Muslera				(Iceland) Kolbeinn Sigþórsson (Netherlands) Ryan Donk
Gaziantepspor	(Algeria) Nabil Ghilas	(Belarus) Syarhey Kislyak	(Brazil) Marcinho	(Brazil) Marquinhos	(Brazil) Paulo Victor	(Brazil) Wallace	(Czech Republic) František Rajtoral	(Equatorial Guinea) Yoiver González	(Ghana) Mohammed Fatau	(Ivory Coast) Davy Claude Angan	(Senegal) Khaly Thiam	(Tunisia) Änis Ben-Hatira	(Zambia) Evans Kangwa		(Belarus) Anton Putsila (Brazil) Bruno Mota (Cameroon) Charles Itandje (Czech Republic) Daniel Kolář (Netherlands) Bart van Hintum (Sweden) Daniel Larsson
Gençlerbirliği	(Albania) Agon Mehmeti	(Belarus) Sergey Politevich	(Brazil) Bady	(Brazil) Luccas Claro	(Ghana) Kamal Issah	(Montenegro) Aleksandar Šćekić	(Romania) Cosmin Matei	(Serbia) Marko Milinković	(Slovenia) Etien Velikonja	(South Africa) Tokelo Rantie	(Sweden) Abdul Khalili	(Sweden) Johannes Hopf	(Sweden) Jonathan Ring		(Croatia) Ante Kulušić (Ghana) Samuel Owusu (Guinea) Guy-Michel Landel (Romania) Bogdan Stancu
Karabükspor	(Bosnia and Herzegovina) Ermin Zec	(Burkina Faso) Abdou Traoré	(Cameroon) Dany Nounkeu	(Gabon) André Poko	(Iceland) Ólafur Ingi Skúlason	(Mali) Mustapha Yatabaré	(Romania) Cristian Tănase	(Romania) Iasmin Latovlevici	(Romania) Paul Papp	(Romania) Valerică Găman	(Slovenia) Dejan Lazarević	(Ukraine) Andriy Bliznichenko	(Ukraine) Oleksandr Rybka	(Ukraine) Yevhen Seleznyov	(Brazil) Adriano (Croatia) Elvis Kokalović (Montenegro) Vladimir Rodić (Nigeria) Isaac Promise (Romania) Marius Alexe
Kasımpaşa	(Argentina) Cristian Guanca	(Brazil) Titi	(Bulgaria) Strahil Popov	(Bulgaria) Vasil Bozhikov	(Cameroon) Franck Etoundi	(Czech Republic) David Pavelka	(France) Olivier Veigneau	(Guinea) Bengali-Fodé Koita	(Hungary) Kenneth Otigba	(Kosovo) Herolind Shala	(Kosovo) Loret Sadiku	(Nigeria) Samuel Eduok	(Portugal) André Castro		(Syria) Sanharib Malki
Kayserispor	(Brazil) Douglão	(Brazil) Welliton	(Burkina Faso) Alain Traoré	(Cameroon) Jean-Armel Kana-Biyik	(Cameroon) Landry Nguémo	(Cape Verde) Ryan Mendes	(Comoros) Ali Ahamada	(Democratic Republic of the Congo) Larrys Mabiala	(Mali) Samba Sow	(Nigeria) Raheem Lawal	(Portugal) Varela	(Serbia) Miladin Stevanović	(Slovenia) Rajko Rotman		(Burkina Faso) Préjuce Nakoulma (Serbia) Srđan Mijailović
Konyaspor	(Bosnia and Herzegovina) Amir Hadžiahmetović	(Bosnia and Herzegovina) Deni Milošević	(Bosnia and Herzegovina) Riad Bajić	(Bulgaria) Dimitar Rangelov	(Cameroon) Marc Mbamba	(Denmark) Jens Jønsson	(Ivory Coast) Moryké Fofana	(Kosovo) Alban Meha	(Romania) Ioan Hora	(Scotland) Barry Douglas	(Serbia) Jagoš Vuković	(Slovenia) Nejc Skubic			
Osmanlıspor	(Bosnia and Herzegovina) Avdija Vršajević	(Brazil) Luíz Carlos	(Cameroon) Pierre Webó	(Czech Republic) Václav Procházka	(Lithuania) Žydrūnas Karčemarskas	(Morocco) Adrien Regattin	(Netherlands) Adam Maher	(Nigeria) Aminu Umar	(Poland) Łukasz Szukała	(Portugal) Tiago Pinto	(Republic of the Congo) Dzon Delarge	(Republic of the Congo) Thievy Bifouma	(Romania) Raul Rusescu	(Senegal) Badou Ndiaye	(Brazil) Artur Moraes (Mali) Cheick Diabaté (Nigeria) Raheem Lawal
Trabzonspor	(Algeria) Carl Medjani	(Argentina) Emmanuel Mas	(Argentina) Luis Ibáñez	(Colombia) Fabián Castillo	(Colombia) Hugo Rodallega	(Costa Rica) Esteban Alvarado	(Nigeria) Ogenyi Onazi	(Portugal) João Pereira	(Senegal) Dame N'Doye	(Slovakia) Ján Ďurica	(Slovakia) Matúš Bero				(Azerbaijan) Ramil Sheydayev (South Korea) Suk Hyun-jun (Togo) Serge Akakpo

== League table ==
Pos	Team	Pld	W	D	L	GF	GA	GD	Pts	Qualification or relegation
1	Beşiktaş (C)	34	23	8	3	73	30	+43	77	Qualification for the Champions League group stage
2	Başakşehir	34	21	10	3	63	28	+35	73	Qualification for the Champions League third qualifying round
3	Fenerbahçe	34	18	10	6	60	32	+28	64 (Note: Fenerbahçe ahead of Galatasaray on head-to-head points: Fenerbahçe 6 pts, Galatasaray 0 pts.)	Qualification for the Europa League third qualifying round
4	Galatasaray	34	20	4	10	65	40	+25	64	Qualification for the Europa League second qualifying round
5	Antalyaspor	34	17	7	10	47	40	+7	58	
6	Trabzonspor	34	14	9	11	39	34	+5	51	
7	Akhisar Belediyespor	34	14	6	14	46	42	+4	48	
8	Gençlerbirliği	34	12	10	12	33	34	−1	46	
9	Konyaspor	34	11	10	13	40	45	−5	43 (Note: Konyaspor ahead of Kasımpaşa and Kardemir Karabükspor on head-to-head points: Konyaspor 8 pts, Kasımpaşa 3 pts, Kardemir Karabükspor 3 pts. Kasımpaşa ahead of Kardemir Karabükspor on head-to-head goal difference.)	Qualification for the Europa League group stage (Note: Konyaspor qualified for the Europa League group stage by winning the 2016–17 Turkish Cup.)
10	Kasımpaşa	34	12	7	15	46	50	−4	43	
11	Kardemir Karabükspor	34	12	7	15	38	48	−10	43	
12	Alanyaspor	34	12	4	18	54	65	−11	40	
13	Osmanlıspor	34	9	11	14	37	45	−8	38 (Note: Osmanlıspor were ahead of Bursaspor and Kayserispor on head-to-head points: Osmanlıspor 6 pts, Bursaspor 5 pts, Kayserispor 4 pts.)	
14	Bursaspor	34	11	5	18	34	58	−24	38	
15	Kayserispor	34	10	8	16	47	58	−11	38	
16	Çaykur Rizespor (R)	34	10	6	18	44	53	−9	36	Relegation to TFF First League
17	Gaziantepspor (R)	34	7	5	22	30	65	−35	26	Relegation to TFF First League
18	Adanaspor (R)	34	6	7	21	33	62	−29	25	Relegation to TFF First League

Source: Süper Lig, Soccerway
Rules for classification: 1) Points; 2) Head-to-head points; 3) Head-to-head goal difference; 4) Head-to-head goals scored; 5) Goal difference; 6) Goals scored; 7) Play-off.
(C) Champions; (R) Relegated

== Results ==
Home \ Away	ADA	AKH	ALA	ANT	BEŞ	BUR	ÇAY	FEN	GAL	GAZ	GEN	BAŞ	KAR	KSM	KAY	KON	OSM	TRA
Adanaspor	—	2–1	3–2	2–5	1–2	1–2	1–3	1–3	0–1	0–0	0–2	1–1	1–2	3–0	2–1	0–1	1–5	1–1
Akhisar Belediyespor	1–0	—	3–0	3–0	0–2	5–1	1–0	1–3	1–3	6–0	0–0	2–1	2–3	1–0	0–0	1–0	1–2	1–3
Alanyaspor	4–1	0–0	—	2–1	1–4	0–2	2–3	2–3	2–3	4–3	3–0	0–5	4–2	3–1	3–0	2–3	0–1	3–0
Antalyaspor	1–0	0–0	2–1	—	0–0	2–1	1–1	1–0	2–3	4–1	1–0	0–1	1–0	2–1	2–1	1–3	0–0	0–3
Beşiktaş	3–2	3–1	4–1	3–0	—	2–1	1–0	1–1	2–2	1–0	3–0	1–1	3–1	4–1	2–2	5–1	4–0	2–1
Bursaspor	0–1	0–0	1–3	2–1	0–2	—	2–1	1–1	0–5	2–1	1–2	0–2	3–0	1–0	3–1	2–0	0–0	1–2
Çaykur Rizespor	2–2	1–0	1–0	1–2	0–1	6–0	—	1–5	1–1	2–0	2–1	3–3	1–0	0–1	2–4	1–1	0–1	0–1
Fenerbahçe	2–2	3–1	1–1	0–1	0–0	0–1	2–1	—	2–0	2–1	3–0	1–0	5–0	0–0	3–3	2–3	1–0	1–1
Galatasaray	4–0	6–0	5–1	3–1	0–1	3–1	2–0	0–1	—	3–1	3–2	1–2	1–0	1–3	1–2	2–1	2–0	0–1
Gaziantepspor	1–0	1–2	2–3	0–3	0–4	3–2	1–2	1–1	1–2	—	0–1	0–1	0–0	0–2	1–2	0–3	3–1	1–0
Gençlerbirliği	0–1	2–0	0–0	1–1	1–1	3–1	1–0	1–2	0–1	2–0	—	0–0	2–0	1–0	2–1	2–0	1–1	0–0
İstanbul Başakşehir	2–1	5–1	2–1	2–2	3–1	1–0	2–1	1–0	4–0	0–0	2–1	—	3–3	3–1	5–0	1–1	2–2	1–0
Karabükspor	2–0	1–0	0–2	3–2	2–1	0–0	3–0	0–1	2–1	2–0	1–0	0–2	—	0–0	2–2	1–1	1–0	4–0
Kasımpaşa	1–1	0–2	2–1	0–3	2–1	4–0	4–2	1–5	1–2	0–0	3–0	4–0	2–2	—	3–1	1–1	3–2	0–1
Kayserispor	1–1	0–2	3–0	0–1	0–1	2–0	2–1	4–1	1–1	3–4	0–2	0–1	2–0	2–2	—	2–1	1–4	0–1
Konyaspor	1–0	0–3	2–3	1–1	2–2	2–0	2–1	0–1	0–1	1–2	1–1	0–3	3–0	2–1	1–0	—	1–1	1–1
Osmanlıspor	1–0	0–4	2–0	1–2	0–2	1–1	1–2	1–1	2–2	0–2	2–2	0–1	2–1	1–2	1–1	0–0	—	0–1
Trabzonspor	4–1	0–0	0–0	0–1	3–4	1–2	2–2	0–3	2–0	4–0	0–0	0–0	1–0	2–0	2–3	1–0	0–2	—

Source: Turkish Football Federation (in Turkish)
Legend: Blue = home team win; Yellow = draw; Red = away team win.
For upcoming matches, an "a" indicates there is an article about the rivalry between the two participants.

== Positions by round ==
The following table represents the teams' positions after each round in the competition.

Team ╲ Round	1	2	3	4	5	6	7	8	9	10	11	12	13	14	15	16	17	18	19	20	21	22	23	24	25	26	27	28	29	30	31	32	33	34
Beşiktaş	1	3	2	2	3	2	2	2	2	2	2	2	2	2	2	2	2	1	1	1	1	1	1	1	1	1	1	1	1	1	1	1	1	1
İstanbul Başakşehir	7	2	1	1	1	1	1	1	1	1	1	1	1	1	1	1	1	2	2	2	2	2	2	2	2	2	2	2	2	2	2	2	2	2
Fenerbahçe	13	13	16	10	7	9	9	5	5	5	3	3	4	4	4	4	4	4	4	4	4	4	4	4	4	4	3	3	3	3	3	3	3	3
Galatasaray	6	1	3	3	4	3	3	3	3	3	5	4	3	3	3	3	3	3	3	3	3	3	3	3	3	3	4	4	4	4	4	4	4	4
Antalyaspor	10	15	17	17	17	18	18	18	17	16	11	10	10	9	9	9	7	5	5	5	5	5	6	6	6	6	6	6	6	6	6	5	5	5
Trabzonspor	4	6	13	14	11	12	12	10	11	13	13	14	12	10	12	13	12	11	9	6	6	6	5	5	5	5	5	5	5	5	5	6	6	6
Akhisar Belediyespor	2	7	12	13	14	14	13	11	14	17	16	12	11	13	14	10	13	13	13	13	13	13	13	14	15	14	14	14	12	10	8	7	7	7
Gençlerbirliği	3	4	6	8	5	5	7	8	7	9	8	9	8	8	8	8	9	9	10	11	8	9	7	9	8	9	9	7	7	8	9	10	8	8
Konyaspor	8	11	5	7	9	8	8	9	12	6	6	6	6	6	6	7	8	6	7	7	9	10	8	10	9	7	7	8	8	9	10	9	10	9
Kasımpaşa	16	17	18	18	18	17	17	15	10	11	10	13	14	14	13	12	10	12	12	12	12	11	12	8	7	8	8	10	10	7	7	8	9	10
Alanyaspor	18	10	9	6	8	11	11	16	16	12	14	11	13	12	11	14	14	14	15	14	14	14	15	15	13	13	12	13	14	13	11	11	11	11
Karabükspor	14	5	11	9	10	7	5	6	6	7	9	7	9	11	10	11	11	10	11	10	11	8	11	7	10	10	13	11	11	11	12	12	12	12
Osmanlıspor	11	12	7	5	6	6	6	7	8	8	7	8	7	7	7	6	6	8	6	9	7	7	10	12	12	12	11	9	9	12	13	13	13	13
Bursaspor	5	8	4	4	2	4	4	4	4	4	4	5	5	5	5	5	5	7	8	8	10	12	9	11	11	11	10	12	13	14	15	15	15	14
Kayserispor	17	16	15	16	13	15	15	13	15	15	17	17	17	17	18	16	16	17	17	16	15	15	14	13	14	15	15	15	15	15	14	14	14	15
Çaykur Rizespor	9	18	10	12	16	16	16	14	13	14	15	16	16	16	15	15	15	15	14	15	16	16	16	16	16	17	16	17	17	16	16	16	16	16
Gaziantepspor	15	9	8	11	15	10	10	12	9	10	12	15	15	15	16	17	18	18	18	18	18	18	18	18	18	16	17	16	16	17	17	17	17	17
Adanaspor	12	14	14	15	12	13	14	17	18	18	18	18	18	18	17	18	17	16	16	17	17	17	17	17	17	18	18	18	18	18	18	18	18	18

Leader / 2017–18 Champions League
2017–18 UEFA Champions League Play-off round
2017–18 UEFA Europa League Play-off round
2017–18 UEFA Europa League Third qualifying round
Relegation to 2017–18 TFF First League

Source: tff.org (in Turkish)

== Results by round ==
The following table represents the teams game results in each round.

Team ╲ Round	1	2	3	4	5	6	7	8	9	10	11	12	13	14	15	16	17	18	19	20	21	22	23	24	25	26	27	28	29	30	31	32	33	34
Adanaspor	L	D	D	L	W	L	L	L	L	D	L	L	L	L	W	D	D	W	W	L	L	L	L	L	W	L	L	L	L	W	D	D	L	L
Akhisar Belediyespor	W	L	L	L	D	D	D	W	L	L	D	W	W	L	D	W	L	D	L	W	L	W	L	L	L	W	L	W	W	W	W	W	W	L
Alanyaspor	L	W	D	W	L	L	D	L	L	W	L	W	L	W	D	L	L	L	L	W	D	W	L	L	W	W	W	L	L	W	W	L	L	L
Antalyaspor	D	L	L	L	D	L	D	L	W	W	W	W	D	W	L	W	W	W	W	D	W	L	L	W	D	W	D	L	W	L	W	W	W	W
Beşiktaş	W	D	W	W	D	W	W	W	D	W	W	D	D	W	L	W	W	W	W	L	W	W	W	D	D	W	W	W	L	D	W	W	W	W
Bursaspor	W	L	W	W	W	L	D	W	W	D	D	L	W	L	W	L	L	L	L	D	L	L	W	D	L	L	W	L	L	L	L	L	L	W
Çaykur Rizespor	D	L	W	L	L	L	D	W	D	D	L	L	L	L	W	L	W	L	W	L	D	L	L	L	L	L	W	D	L	W	L	W	W	W
Fenerbahçe	L	D	L	W	W	D	D	W	W	W	W	W	D	L	W	W	D	W	L	D	D	D	W	W	L	W	W	W	W	D	L	W	D	W
Galatasaray	W	W	D	W	D	W	W	L	W	L	L	W	W	W	D	W	W	L	W	L	D	L	W	W	L	W	L	L	W	L	W	W	W	W
Gaziantepspor	L	W	D	L	L	W	D	L	W	L	L	L	L	L	L	L	L	L	L	W	D	D	L	L	W	W	L	W	D	L	L	L	L	L
Gençlerbirliği	W	D	D	D	W	D	L	L	D	L	W	D	W	D	L	W	L	W	D	L	W	L	W	L	W	L	D	W	D	L	L	L	W	W
İstanbul Başakşehir	W	W	W	W	D	W	D	W	W	W	W	D	D	D	W	D	W	L	W	L	D	W	W	W	D	L	W	D	W	W	W	D	W	W
Karabükspor	L	W	L	W	L	W	W	L	L	D	D	W	L	L	D	L	W	W	L	W	L	W	L	W	D	L	L	D	D	W	L	L	D	W
Kasımpaşa	L	D	L	L	L	W	D	W	W	L	D	L	L	W	W	L	W	L	L	W	D	W	D	W	W	L	D	D	L	W	W	L	L	L
Kayserispor	L	D	D	L	W	L	L	W	L	D	L	L	L	L	L	W	L	D	W	W	W	W	D	D	L	L	L	L	W	W	W	D	D	L
Konyaspor	D	D	W	D	L	W	D	L	L	W	W	D	W	L	D	L	L	W	L	D	L	D	W	L	W	W	D	L	D	L	L	W	L	L
Osmanlıspor	D	D	W	W	D	D	D	L	L	D	W	D	W	W	D	W	L	L	D	L	W	L	L	D	L	L	W	W	D	L	L	L	L	L
Trabzonspor	W	L	L	L	W	L	D	W	D	L	L	D	W	W	L	L	W	W	W	W	D	D	W	W	W	W	L	W	D	L	D	D	D	L

W = Win; D = Draw; L = Loss

== Statistics ==
=== Top goalscorers ===
As of 3 June 2017

"Süper Lig Top Goalscorers". TFF.
"Süper Lig Top Goalscorers". NTV Spor.

Pos.	Player	Team	Goals
1	(Brazil) Vágner Love	Alanyaspor	23
2	(Turkey) Cenk Tosun	Beşiktaş	20
3	(Cameroon) Samuel Eto'o	Antalyaspor	18
4	(Bosnia and Herzegovina) Riad Bajić	Konyaspor	17
5	(Cameroon) Léonard Kweuke	Çaykur Rizespor	14
6	(Brazil) Talisca	Beşiktaş	13
6	(Turkey) Serdar Gürler	Gençlerbirliği	13
8	(Senegal) Moussa Sow	Fenerbahçe	12
8	(Brazil) Welliton	Kayserispor	12
8	(Cameroon) Vincent Aboubakar	Beşiktaş	12

=== Top assists ===
As of 1 June 2017

"Maçkolik Süper Lig-Futbolcu İstatistikleri" (in Turkish). Maçkolik.

Pos.	Player	Team	Assists
1	(Netherlands) Wesley Sneijder	Galatasaray	15
2	(Portugal) Ricardo Quaresma	Beşiktaş	13
3	(Turkey) Deniz Türüç	Kayserispor	11
4	(Netherlands) Jeremain Lens	Fenerbahçe	10
5	(Turkey) Emre Belözoğlu	İstanbul Başakşehir	8
5	(Brazil) Mossoró	İstanbul Başakşehir	8
5	(Turkey) Olcan Adın	Akhisar Belediyespor	8
8	(Bosnia and Herzegovina) Edin Višća	İstanbul Başakşehir	7
8	(Turkey) Olcay Şahan	Trabzonspor	7
8	(Cameroon) Pierre Webó	Osmanlıspor	7

=== Hat-tricks ===
As of 14 May 2017

Date	Player	For	Against	Result
27 November 2016	Moussa Sow	Fenerbahçe	Çaykur Rizespor	1–5
11 December 2016	Yasin Öztekin	Galatasaray	Gaziantepspor	3–1
30 January 2017	Cenk Tosun	Beşiktaş	Konyaspor	5–1
18 March 2017	Adem Büyük	Kasımpaşa	Osmanlıspor	3–2
18 March 2017	Nabil Ghilas	Gaziantepspor	Kayserispor	3–4
10 April 2017	Emmanuel Adebayor	İstanbul Başakşehir	Galatasaray	4–0
30 April 2017	Samuel Eto'o	Antalyaspor	Adanaspor	2–5
14 May 2017	Vágner Love	Alanyaspor	Karabükspor	4–2
2 June 2017	Ermin Zec	Karabükspor	Akhisar Belediyespor	2–3

=== Clean sheets ===
As of 1 June 2017

==== Player ====
Rank	Player	Club	Match Played	Clean sheets
1	(Turkey) Onur Kıvrak	Trabzonspor	32	15
1	(Turkey) Volkan Babacan	İstanbul Başakşehir	32	15
3	(Sweden) Johannes Hopf	Gençlerbirliği	33	14
4	(Spain) Fabri	Beşiktaş	31	12
5	(Turkey) Ahmet Şahin	Karabükspor	26	9
5	(Turkey) Volkan Demirel	Fenerbahçe	27	9
5	(Uruguay) Fernando Muslera	Galatasaray	33	9
8	(Turkey) Ramazan Köse	Kasımpaşa	31	8
8	(Turkey) Harun Tekin	Bursaspor	33	8

==== Club ====
Rank	Club	Match Played	Clean sheets
1	Trabzonspor	29	15
2	İstanbul Başakşehir	29	13
2	Gençlerbirliği	29	13
2	Akhisar Belediyespor	29	13
5	Beşiktaş	29	11
5	Fenerbahçe	29	11
7	Antalyaspor	29	10

== Awards ==
=== Annual awards ===
Team of the Season
Goalkeeper	(Sweden) Johannes Hopf (Gençlerbirliği)				
Defence	(Turkey) Gökhan Gönül (Fenerbahçe)		(Brazil) Marcelo (Beşiktaş)	(Slovakia) Martin Škrtel (Fenerbahçe)	(Brazil) Adriano (Beşiktaş)
Midfield	(Turkey) Cengiz Ünder (Başakşehir)	(Canada) Atiba Hutchinson (Beşiktaş)	(Brazil) Talisca (Beşiktaş)	(Turkey) Emre Belözoğlu (Başakşehir)	(Portugal) Bruma (Galatasaray)
Attack	(Brazil) Vágner Love (Alanyaspor)				

== Attendances ==
These are the average attendances of all the top division teams.

Pos	Team	Total	High	Low	Average	Change
1	Beşiktaş				30,448	n/a
2	Galatasaray				21,351	n/a
3	Trabzonspor				17,252	n/a
4	Fenerbahçe				16,485	n/a
5	Bursaspor				16,106	n/a
6	Konyaspor				15,723	n/a
7	Antalyaspor				12,645	n/a
8	Kayserispor				5,524	n/a
9	Adanaspor				4,594	n/a
10	Alanyaspor				4,541	n/a
11	Karabükspor				4,422	n/a
12	Gaziantepspor				4,236	n/a
13	Osmanlıspor				3,792	n/a
14	Çaykur Rizespor				3,369	n/a
15	İstanbul Başakşehir				3,208	n/a
16	Gençlerbirliği				2,625	n/a
17	Akhisar Belediyespor				2,501	n/a
18	Kasımpaşa				1,416	n/a
	League total	0	0	0	0	n/a

Updated to games played on 3 November 2016
Source: World Football and European Football Statistics
Notes:
^{†}

== See also ==
- 2016–17 Turkish Cup
- 2016–17 TFF First League
- 2016–17 TFF Second League
- 2016–17 TFF Third League
