= Açıkgöz =

Açıkgöz is a Turkish surname. It may refer to:

- Derya Açıkgöz (born 1977), Turkish female retired weightlifter
- Hadise Açıkgöz (born 1985), Turkish pop singer, songwriter, dancer and television personality
- Levent Açıkgöz (born 1971), Turkish retired footballer
