= Kofi Amoako =

Kofi Amoako may refer to:

- Kofi Amoako (footballer, born 1979), Ghanaian football defender
- Kofi Amoako (footballer) (born 2005), German football midfielder
- Kofi Amoako, birth name for DJ Vyrusky, Ghanaian disc jockey

== See also ==
- Kofi Amoako Atta (born 1997), Ghanaian football midfielder
