= Karabük İdman Yurdu =

- Full name: Karabük İdman Yurdu Spor Kulübü
- Founded: 2015
- Ground: Dr. Necmettin Şeyhoğlu Stadium, Karabük
- Capacity: 11,378
- Manager: (Turkey) Adem Aydım
Home colours	Away colours

Karabük İdman Yurdu (Karabük Sports Club) is a Turkish football team that was founded in 2015. The team competes in the Turkish lower leagues. It is a successor phoenix club of Kardemir Karabükspor. Karabükspor was dissolved in 2023 following 5 years of massive financial problems and repeated relegations that culminated in a ban from the Turkish amateur system due to forfeits caused by failing to field a team.

The club began in 2015 under the name of Adatepe Dökecekspor before it was renamed and rebranded in 2023 to match the colours, nickname and playing kit of the old Karabükspor team.
