= Talisca =

Brazilian footballer (born 1994)

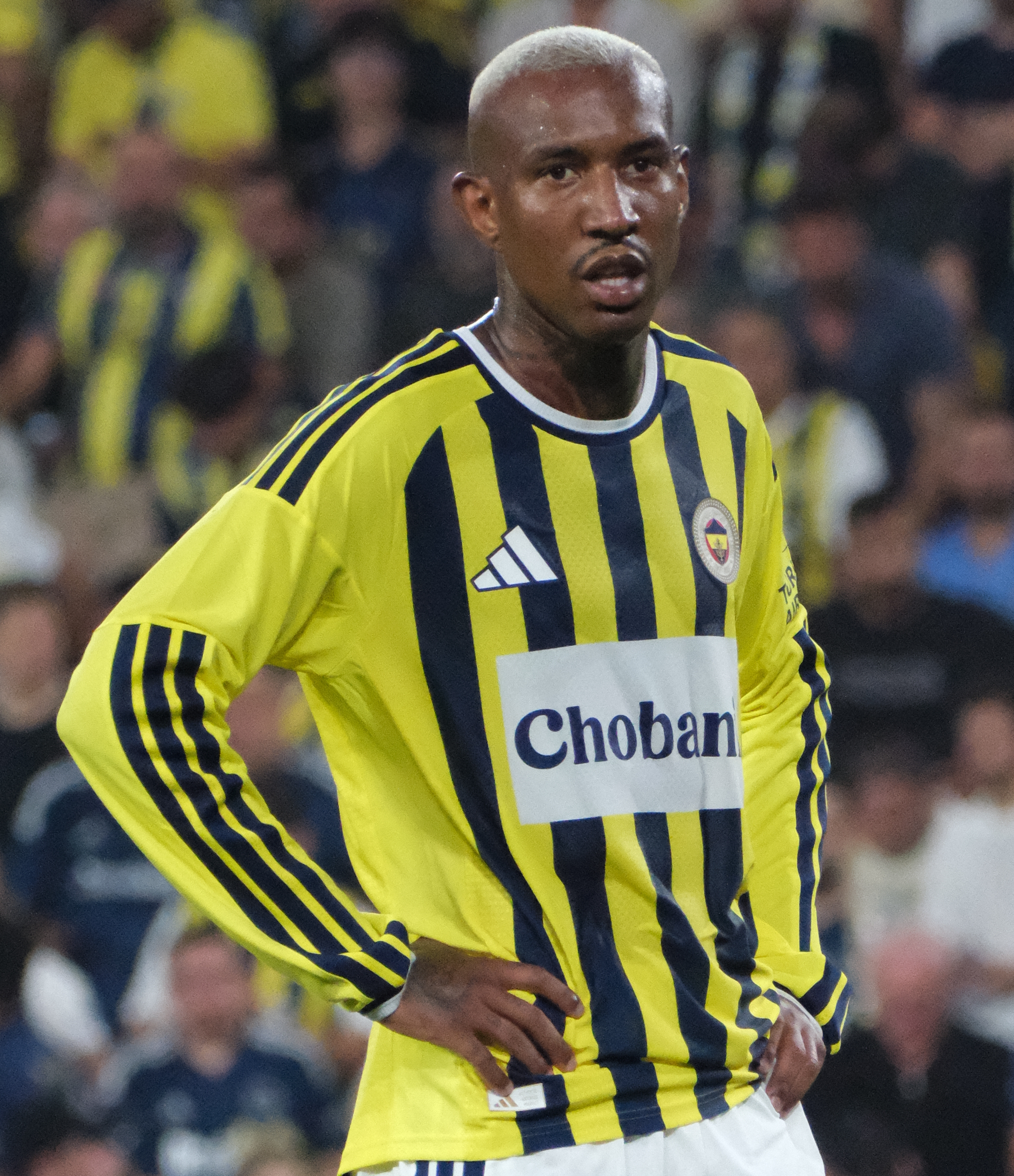
- Talisca with Fenerbahçe in 2026

Personal information
- Date of birth: 1 February 1994 (age 32)
- Place of birth: Feira de Santana, Brazil
- Height: 1.90 m (6 ft 3 in)
- Positions: Attacking midfielder; forward

Team information
- Current team: Al Jazira
- Number: 94

Youth career
- 2007: Vasco da Gama
- 2009–2013: Bahia

Senior career*
Years	Team	Apps	(Gls)
2013–2014	Bahia	60	(11)
2014–2018	Benfica	53	(12)
2016–2018	→ Beşiktaş (loan)	55	(27)
2018	→ Guangzhou (loan)	18	(16)
2018–2021	Guangzhou	35	(17)
2021–2025	Al-Nassr	78	(62)
2025–2026	Fenerbahçe	47	(29)
2026–	Al Jazira	2	(0)

International career
2013–2014	Brazil U20	2	(0)
2014–2015	Brazil U23	4	(1)
- * Club domestic league appearances and goals as of 10 September 2026

Anderson Souza Conceição (born 1 February 1994), known as Anderson Talisca or simply Talisca, is a Brazilian professional footballer who plays as an attacking midfielder and forward for UAE Pro League club Al Jazira.

== Club career ==
=== Bahia ===
A youth graduate from Bahia, where he arrived in 2009, Talisca made his professional debut against Corinthians on 7 July 2013, and scored his first goal in the next match against São Paulo.

=== Benfica ===
On 5 July 2014, after his debut season, Talisca moved to Portuguese champion Benfica for a €4.75 million fee (agent fee included), the highest paid for a Bahia player. On 18 July 2014, he scored his first goal for Benfica on his debut in their Taça de Honra semi-final win against Estoril. On 12 September, he scored a hat-trick in an away victory against Vitória de Setúbal. On 27 September, he scored two goals in a row against Estoril in an away win (3–2) and became the Primeira Liga's top goalscorer with five goals. On 5 October, he scored his sixth goal in Portuguese league and maintained the top scorer lead. On 31 October, he scored his eighth and fourth consecutive goal in Primeira Liga, in a home win against Rio Ave (1–0), keeping the top scorer lead.

On 4 November 2014, he scored his first goal in the UEFA Champions League, the only goal of the game to defeat Monaco in the group stage. He described scoring the 82nd-minute goal as the "best feeling" in his life. On 26 January 2016, he netted a hat-trick in a 6–1 win at Moreirense in the Taça da Liga.

In the 2015–16 season, Talisca scored Benfica's winning goal in a 2–1 away victory against Zenit Saint Petersburg in the second leg of UEFA Champions League's round of 16, to make the aggregate score 3–1. On 8 May, he sealed the 2–0 away win at Marítimo in the league with a direct free kick.

==== Beşiktaş (loan) ====
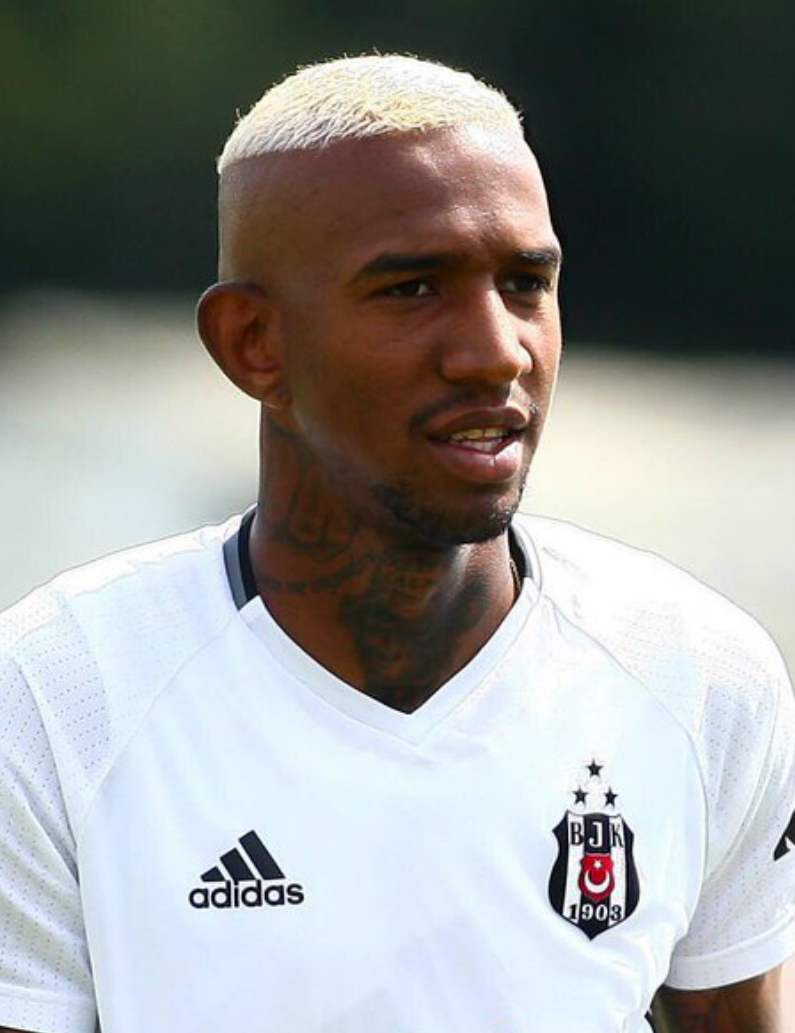
Talisca with Beşiktaş in 2018

On 24 August 2016, Talisca joined Turkish club Beşiktaş on a 2-year loan deal for a €2 million fee for the first season. Talisca signed a contract worth €1.5 million in the first season plus bonuses. On 13 September, on his return to the Estádio da Luz in a Champions League group game, he scored an added-time free kick to ensure a 1–1 draw.

=== Guangzhou ===
On 8 June 2018, Talisca was loaned out to Chinese Super League side Guangzhou Evergrande Taobao for a half year, for a loan fee of €5.8 million. He made his debut for Guangzhou Evergrande as a starter and scored a hat-trick, including a direct free kick, to help his team win 4–0 over Guizhou Hengfeng in the league on 18 July. On 29 July 2018, he scored two goals in his second appearance for Guangzhou in a 5–0 home win over Chongqing Dangdai Lifan.

On 26 October 2018, Benfica announced that Talisca had moved permanently to the Chinese club for a transfer fee of €19.2 million.

=== Al-Nassr ===
On 17 May 2021, Talisca joined Saudi Pro League side Al-Nassr for a reported transfer fee of $9.5 million. On 16 December 2022, he scored a hat-trick for the club, helping his side to a 4–1 away league victory against Al-Raed.

On 7 April 2023, Talisca signed a new three-year contract to keep him at Al-Nassr until 2026.

On 7 November 2023, he scored a hat-trick for his club against Al-Duhail and won in a group match of the 2023–24 AFC Champions League, Becoming the first player to score a hat-trick for the club in the Champions League.

He is nicknamed Abu-Souza by the club fans.

=== Fenerbahçe ===
==== 2024–25 season ====
On 27 January 2025, Fenerbahçe announced they had reached an agreement with Al-Nassr for the transfer of Talisca. On 2 February 2025, he made his Süper Lig debut for the club in a 3–2 home win against Çaykur Rizespor.

On 5 February 2025, he scored his first goal for the team in a 5–0 Turkish Cup victory over Erzurumspor. Four days later on 9 February 2025, he scored his first Süper Lig goal for the club against Alanyaspor in a 0–2 away win. On 6 April 2025, Talisca came off the bench and scored his first hat-trick in the Süper Lig in a 4–1 home win over Trabzonspor.

==== 2025–26 season ====
On 12 August 2025, he scored his first continental goal for the team against Feyenoord into the second match of UEFA Champions League qualifying.

On 27 October 2025, he scored a brace in 4-0 away win Süper Lig match against Gaziantep as a 78th min substitute. On 11 December 2025, he made a perfect hat-trick, scored one right-footed goal, one left-footed goal and one headed goal in a UEFA Europa League 0-4 away victory against Brann.

On 8 February 2026, Talisca signed a new two-year contract to keep him at Fenerbahçe until June 2028.

==== 2026–27 season ====
Talisca started the 2026-27 season with a free-kick goal in 1-0 home win against Górnik Zabrze in the first leg of the 2026–27 UEFA Champions League second qualifying round.

== International career ==
On 11 November 2014, Talisca was called up by Dunga to the Brazil national team to replace Lucas Moura in the international fixtures against Turkey and Austria.

He was called again by coach Tite in March 2018 to take part in the away friendly fixtures against Russia and Germany, but he did not play in either match.

== Style of play ==
He has been nicknamed "Yaya Talisca" in reference to Ivorian midfielder Yaya Touré, but bases his game on that of his compatriot Neymar. He has also been compared to fellow Brazilian Rivaldo. In addition to his usual role as a number ten, he can also be deployed as a second striker or wide attacker.

== Club ownership ==
On 1 June 2016, Talisca launched Esporte Clube Olímpia in Lauro de Freitas, Bahia, modelling it on Chapecoense as a club that would develop players. Due to clauses in his Beşiktaş and sponsorship contracts, the club could not enter competitions while he was president, so he transferred the role to his mother Ivone Souza. The club finished as runners-up to Doce Mel in the 2019 Campeonato Baiano Second Division, its only professional league season before suspending activities in December 2020.

== Career statistics ==
As of match played 9 October 2026

Appearances and goals by club, season and competition
Club	Season	League			National cup (Note: Includes Copa do Brasil, Taça de Portugal, Turkish Cup, Chinese FA Cup, King's Cup)		League cup (Note: Includes Taça da Liga, UAE League Cup)		Continental		Other		Total	
Club	Season	Division	Apps	Goals	Apps	Goals	Apps	Goals	Apps	Goals	Apps	Goals	Apps	Goals
Bahia	2013	Série A	21	2	1	0	—		3 (Note: Appearances in Copa Sudamericana)	0	13 (Note: Appearance(s) in Campeonato Baiano)	1	38	3
Bahia	2014	Série A	9	2	4	0	—		—		17	6	30	8
Bahia	Total		30	4	5	0	—		3	0	30	7	68	11
Benfica	2014–15	Primeira Liga	32	9	2	0	3	1	6 (Note: Appearance(s) in UEFA Champions League)	1	1 (Note: Appearance in Supertaça Cândido de Oliveira)	0	44	11
Benfica	2015–16	Primeira Liga	21	3	1	0	5	4	5	2	1	0	33	9
Benfica	Total		53	12	3	0	8	5	11	3	2	0	77	20
Beşiktaş (loan)	2016–17	Süper Lig	22	13	2	1	—		9 (Note: Three appearances and one goal in UEFA Champions League, six appearances and two goals in UEFA Europa League)	3	0	0	33	17
Beşiktaş (loan)	2017–18	Süper Lig	33	14	6	2	—		8	4	0	0	47	20
Beşiktaş (loan)	Total		55	27	8	3	—		17	7	0	0	80	37
Guangzhou Evergrande (loan)	2018	Chinese Super League	18	16	0	0	—		0	0	0	0	18	16
Guangzhou Evergrande	2019	Chinese Super League	18	11	1	0	—		8 (Note: Appearance(s) in AFC Champions League)	5	—		27	16
Guangzhou Evergrande	2020	Chinese Super League	17	6	0	0	—		3	1	—		20	7
Guangzhou Evergrande	Total		53	33	1	0	—		11	6	—		65	39
Al-Nassr	2021–22	Saudi Pro League	28	20	2	1	—		3	1	—		33	22
Al-Nassr	2022–23	Saudi Pro League	23	20	3	0	—		—		1 (Note: Appearance(s) in Saudi Super Cup)	1	27	21
Al-Nassr	2023–24	Saudi Pro League	17	16	2	1	—		6	8	6 (Note: Appearances in Arab Club Champions Cup)	1	31	26
Al-Nassr	2024–25	Saudi Pro League	10	6	2	0	—		5	2	2	0	19	8
Al-Nassr	Total		78	62	9	2	—		14	11	9	2	110	77
Fenerbahçe	2024–25	Süper Lig	16	9	3	3	—		4 (Note: Appearances in UEFA Europa League)	0	—		23	12
Fenerbahçe	2025–26	Süper Lig	30	19	3	3	—		11 (Note: Three appearances and one goal in UEFA Champions League, eight appearances and four goal in UEFA Europa League)	5	1 (Note: Appearance in Turkish Super Cup)	0	45	27
Fenerbahçe	2026–27	Süper Lig	1	1	—		—		6	4	—		7	5
Fenerbahçe	Total		47	29	6	6	—		21	9	1	0	75	44
Al Jazira	2026–27	UAE Pro League	2	0	0	0	3	2	1 (Note: Appearance in AFC Champions League Two)	0	—		6	2
Career total			318	167	32	11	11	7	78	37	42	9	481	230

== Honours ==
Bahia

- Campeonato Baiano: 2014

Benfica

- Primeira Liga: 2014–15, 2015–16
- Taça da Liga: 2014–15, 2015–16
- Supertaça Cândido de Oliveira: 2014

Beşiktaş

- Süper Lig: 2016–17

Guangzhou Evergrande

- Chinese Super League: 2019

Al-Nassr

- Arab Club Champions Cup: 2023

Fenerbahçe

- Turkish Super Cup: 2025

Brazil U20

- Toulon Tournament: 2013

Individual

- SJPF Player of the Month: August/September 2014
- Taça da Liga Top scorer: 2015–16 (shared)
- Süper Lig Team of the Season: 2016–17, 2017–18
- Saudi Pro League Team of the Year: 2021–22
- Saudi Pro League Player of the Month: February 2024
