= Esporte Clube Olímpia =

Olímpia
- Full name: Esporte Clube Olímpia
- Nickname: Águia (Eagle)
- Founded: 1 June 2016; 10 years ago
- Ground: Estádio de Pituaçu
- Capacity: 32,157
- President: Ivone Souza
- 2019: Campeonato Baiano Second Division, runner-up

Esporte Clube Olímpia is a Brazilian football club from Lauro de Freitas in the state of Bahia. Founded by Talisca in 2016, the club could not enter professional tournaments until he transferred the presidency to his mother Ivone Souza. The club finished as runner-up in its only professional season, the 2019 Campeonato Baiano Second Division, and withdrew indefinitely in 2020 due to the COVID-19 pandemic.

== History ==
The club was founded on 1 June 2016 by 22-year-old Brazil international footballer and Bahia native Talisca. Inspired by Chapecoense, he wished to establish a club that would develop players who would otherwise miss their opportunities. He pledged R$50,000 (US$14,000) for the year 2017, in which the club would compete in under-15 and under-17 football, with recruitment by former EC Bahia and Vitória scout Ivan Conceição.

In 2018, the club did not compete, as Talisca was the sole director and had contractual clauses with his Turkish employers Beşiktaş and his sponsors. He passed the club to his 50-year-old mother Ivone Souza, a former bus company manager and street vendor. According to Universo Online, she became one of few Afro-Brazilian women presidents of a football club.

Olímpia entered the Campeonato Baiano Second Division in 2019, winning seven and drawing two of 10 group games. In the final, they won 2–1 away to Doce Mel in the first leg, but lost 3–0 at home in the second.

On 3 December 2020, Olímpia announced its withdrawal from all competitions for an undetermined period, due to the economic effects of the COVID-19 pandemic. The under-20 team had been training for the state championship and the 2021 Copa Paulista, both of which were cancelled.
