= Levent Şahin =

Turkish football manager (born 1973)

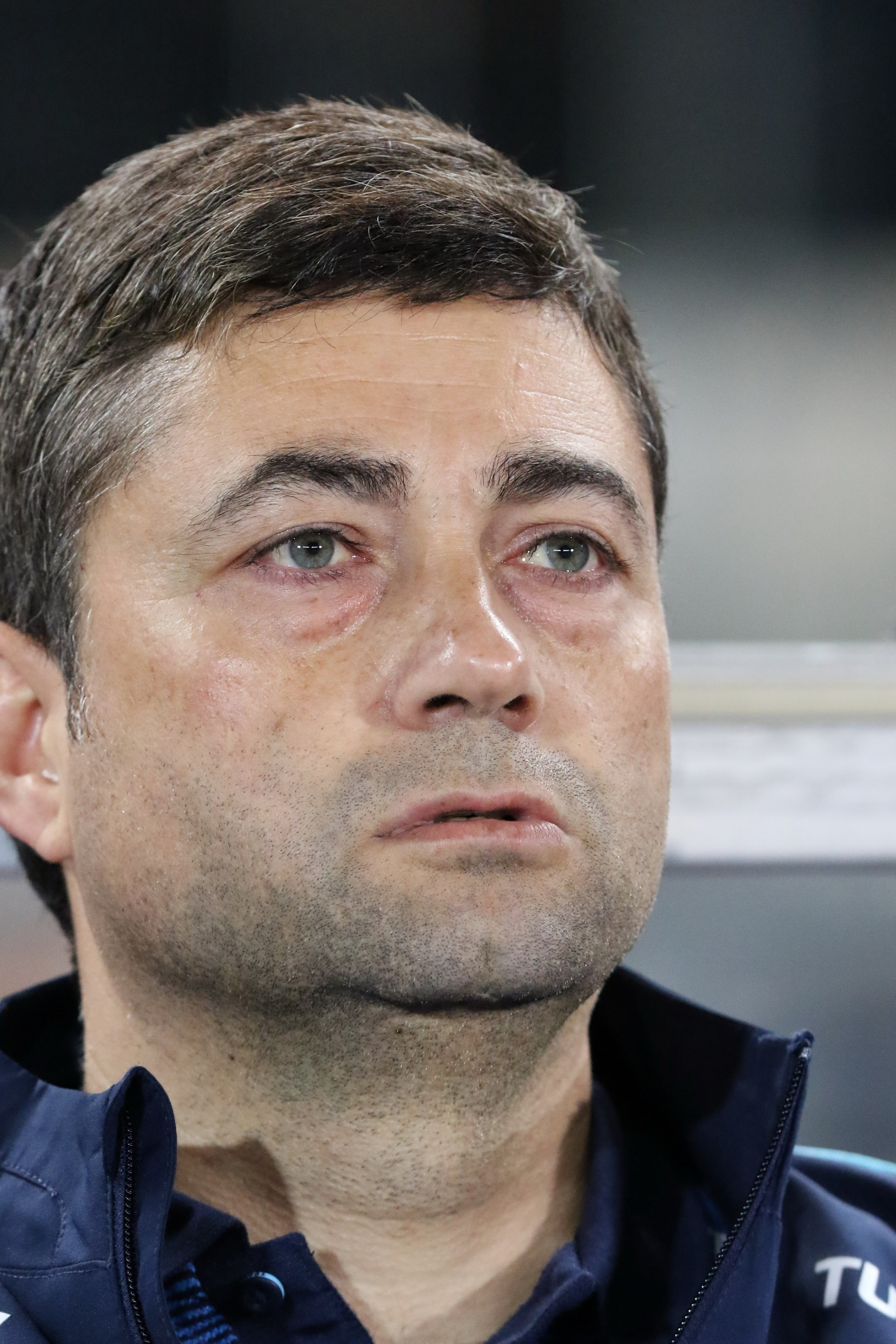
- Şahin in 2016

Personal information
- Date of birth: 20 September 1973 (age 53)
- Place of birth: Edremit, Turkey

Senior career*
Years	Team	Apps	(Gls)
1994–1996	Yeni Yolspor		
1996	Şekerbank Ankara		

Managerial career
- 2000–2002: Ankaragücü (youth)
- 2003: Hacettepe (assistant)
- 2003–2004: Kahramanmaraşspor (assistant)
- 2004–2005: Keçiörengücü (assistant)
- 2005: Osmanlıspor (youth)
- 2006: Gaziantepspor (youth)
- 2007: Çaykur Rizespor (assistant)
- 2007–2008: Bursaspor (assistant)
- 2008–2009: Gençlerbirliği (assistant)
- 2009: Osmanlıspor (assistant)
- 2009–2010: Bugsaşspor
- 2011: Ankaragücü (assistant)
- 2012–2013: Turkey youth
- 2013–2017: Turkey (assistant)
- 2017: Adanaspor
- 2017–2021: Galatasaray (assistant)
- 2023: İskenderunspor
- 2024–2025: Al Shabab (assistant)
- 2026: Gençlerbirliği
- * Club domestic league appearances and goals

Levent Şahin (born 20 September 1973) is a Turkish football manager and former player who last managed Süper Lig club Gençlerbirliği.

== Playing career ==
Levent was born in Edremit. He was an amateur footballer, playing for Yeni Yolspor and Şekerbank Ankara.

== Managerial career ==
Levent began his managerial career as the assistant for Ankaragücü. He was the assistant coach for various teams in the lower divisions of Turkey, before gaining his first head coach experience at Bugsaşspor in 2009 for the TFF Second League. He became the coach for various youth team for the Turkish Football Federation in 2012, and then became an assistant coach for the senior Turkey national team in 2016. in January 2017, Levent became the head coach for Adanaspor in the Süper Lig, simultaneously remaining assistant coach for the Turkey national team. He left this job on 9 April 2017. In December 2017, Levent became the assistant coach for Galatasaray.
