= Mustafa Er =

Turkish football coach and former player

Personal information
- Date of birth: 11 January 1980 (age 46)
- Place of birth: Bursa, Turkey
- Height: 1.80 m (5 ft 11 in)
- Position: Midfielder

Team information
- Current team: Bursaspor (head coach)

Youth career
- 1994–1999: Bursaspor

Senior career*
Years	Team	Apps	(Gls)
1999–2005	Bursaspor	95	(3)
2005–2009	Konyaspor	113	(0)
2009	Ankaragücü	0	(0)
2010	Denizlispor	2	(0)
2010–2013	Bugsaşspor	71	(1)
2013–2014	Erdekspor	10	(4)

International career
1997	Turkey U17	5	(1)
1997	Turkey U18	5	(0)

Managerial career
- 2015–2017: Bursaspor (youth coach)
- 2017–2018: Bursaspor (assistant manager)
- 2018-2019: Bursaspor
- 2019–2020: Kırşehir Belediyespor
- 2020–2021: Bursaspor
- 2022: Bursaspor
- 2023: Ümraniyespor
- 2025: Boluspor
- 2026–: Bursaspor
- * Club domestic league appearances and goals

Mustafa Er (born 11 January 1980) is a Turkish football coach and former player who is the head coach of TFF 1. Lig club Bursaspor.

== Professional career ==
A youth academy product of Bursaspor, Er made his professional debut for Bursaspor in a 5-2 Süper Lig loss to Gaziantepspor on 20 March 1999. Er transferred to Konyaspor from Bursaspor, becoming a stalwart in the midfield for the team.

== Managerial career ==
After his retirement from football, Er became a youth coach at Bursaspor, and worked his way up to assistant manager. On 10 April 2018, Er was appointed interim manager of Bursaspor after Paul Le Guen was sacked.
