= Yoiver González =

Colombian footballer (born 1989)

Personal information
- Full name: Yoiver González Mosquera
- Date of birth: 22 November 1989 (age 36)
- Place of birth: Puerto Tejada, Colombia
- Height: 1.78 m (5 ft 10 in)
- Position: Defender

Team information
- Current team: Jaguares de Cordoba
- Number: 5

Youth career
- 2007–2009: Millonarios

Senior career*
Years	Team	Apps	(Gls)
2010–2016	Millonarios	14	(0)
2011–2012	→ Fortaleza (loan)	52	(4)
2014	→ América (loan)	33	(1)
2016	Deportivo Pasto	31	(0)
2017	Gaziantepspor	0	(0)
2018–2021	Deportivo Pereira	85	(3)
2022–2023	La Equidad	39	(0)
2024–	Jaguares de Cordoba	7	(0)
- * Club domestic league appearances and goals as of 3 April 2018

Yoiver González Mosquera (born 22 November 1989) is a Colombian footballer who plays as a defender for Categoría Primera A club Jaguares de Cordoba.

González is a product of the Millonarios youth system and played with the Millonarios first team since November, 2007.

== International career ==
During his loan in Fortaleza, González was partner of Rolan de la Cruz, a Colombian footballer who was already naturalized to play for Equatorial Guinea, who invited him and helped him to join the Equatoguinean team.

On 21 March 2013, González made a non-recognized-by-FIFA appearance with Equatorial Guinea, in a friendly against the Beninese national team that was made up of local-based players, as the senior Benin national team was conducting a preparatory stage in Marseille, France, ahead of their match against Algeria. He was camouflaged by the Equatoguinean official press as Zeiver Gonzales Ondo. He was also called up to face Cape Verde Islands as part of the 2014 FIFA World Cup qualifying campaign, but did not enter in the match by an ankle problem.
