= Jean Armel Drolé =

Ivorian footballer

Jean-Armel Drolé
Personal information
- Full name: Jean-Armel Drolé Boza
- Date of birth: 18 August 1997 (age 29)
- Place of birth: Abidjan, Ivory Coast
- Height: 1.85 m (6 ft 1 in)
- Position: Winger

Team information
- Current team: L'Aquila

Youth career
- 2013–2015: Tieffe Club Palermo
- 2015: Perugia

Senior career*
Years	Team	Apps	(Gls)
2015–2017	Perugia	30	(1)
2017	→ Antalyaspor (loan)	2	(2)
2017–2021	Antalyaspor	22	(0)
2017–2018	→ Ümraniyespor (loan)	19	(7)
2019–2020	→ Las Palmas (loan)	6	(0)
2022	Doxa Katokopias	10	(0)
2022–2023	Fano	24	(6)
2023–2024	Botoșani	12	(1)
2024–	L'Aquila	0	(0)

International career
2016	Ivory Coast U20	1	(0)
- * Club domestic league appearances and goals as of 5 November 2024

Jean Armel Drolé Boza (born 18 August 1997) is an Ivorian footballer who plays as a winger for Serie D, Girone F team L'Aquila 1927.

== Club career ==
Drolé was born in the Ivory Coast, was orphaned at a young age, and travelled to Italy as a refugee.

In 2013, Drolé joined Tieffe Club, and eventually transferred to Perugia in the Serie B. Drolé made his professional debut in a 0-0 Serie B tie with Cesena in September 2015.

Drolé transferred from Perugia to Antalyaspor on 21 January 2017. Initially on loan, he subsequently joined the club permanently and served a loan stint at Ümraniyespor before establishing himself in the first team.

On 25 July 2019, Drolé joined Segunda División side Las Palmas on a season-long loan deal.

On 25 June 2023, Drolé moved to Romanian side Botoșani. He signed a one-year contract, with the possibility of extending it for another one.

== International career ==
Drolé made his debut for the Ivory Coast national under-20 football team in a 3–2 win over Qatar U20 on 21 March 2016.

=== Social commitment ===
Jean Armel makes food donations to the SOS Children's Village in Abobo.

== Honours ==
Antalyaspor

- Turkish Cup runner-up: 2020–21
