= Erkan Sözeri =

Turkish football coach and former player (born 1966)

Personal information
- Date of birth: 19 May 1966 (age 60)
- Place of birth: Ankara, Turkey
- Height: 1.79 m (5 ft 10 in)
- Position: Left back

Senior career*
| Years | Team | Apps | (Gls) |
| 1988–1991 | Gaziantepspor | 79 | (4) |
| 1991–1992 | Trabzonspor | 8 | (0) |
| 1992–1998 | Gençlerbirliği | 186 | (20) |
| 1998–2000 | Fenerbahçe | 13 | (0) |
| 1999 | → Çaykur Rizespor (loan) | 21 | (2) |
| 2000–2001 | Göztepe | 46 | (1) |

Managerial career
- 2003–2004: Kırıkkalespor (assistant)
- 2004–2005: Kırıkkalespor
- 2006–2007: Muğlaspor
- 2007: Uşakspor (assistant)
- 2007–2008: Şanlıurfaspor
- 2008: Türk Telekom
- 2008–2009: İskenderunspor
- 2009–2011: Fethiyespor
- 2011–2012: Orduspor (assistant)
- 2012: Tokatspor
- 2012–2013: Fethiyespor
- 2013: Alanyaspor
- 2013–2014: Orduspor
- 2014: Orduspor
- 2014–2015: Giresunspor
- 2015: Balıkesirspor
- 2015–2016: Giresunspor
- 2016: Adana Demirspor
- 2016–2017: Ümraniyespor
- 2017: Karabükspor
- 2017: Gazişehir Gaziantep
- 2018–2019: Gençlerbirliği
- 2019: Giresunspor
- 2019–2020: BB Erzurumspor
- 2020–2023: Bandırmaspor
- 2023–2024: Karşıyaka S.K.
- 2024: Şanlıurfaspor
- 2024–2025: Keçiörengücü
- 2025: Şanlıurfaspor
- * Club domestic league appearances and goals

Erkan Sözeri (born 19 May 1966) is a Turkish football coach and former player who most recently managed Şanlıurfaspor. He is best known for his playing career with Gençlerbirliği in the Turkish Süper Lig.

== Professional career ==
Erkan begun his professional career with Gaziantepspor, whom he helped promote to the Süper Lig. He moved to Trabzonspor where he won the Turkish Cup, before transferring to Gençlerbirliği where he spent the majority of his professional career. At the age of 32, he moved to Fenerbahçe, before finishing his career at Göztepe.

== Managerial career ==
Sözeri managed a variety of Turkish clubs in the TFF First League and TFF Second League before coaching the professional Kardemir Karabükspor in the Turkish Süper Lig. On 25 September 2017 he resigned from Karabükspor after a series of bad results.

== Honours ==
=== Club ===
Trabzonspor

- Turkish Cup: 1991–92
