= Kardemir Karabükspor =

Turkish sports club

- Full name: Kardemir Demir Çelik Karabükspor
- Nickname: Mavi Ateş (Blue Flame)
- Founded: 1969
- Dissolved: 2023
- Ground: Dr. Necmettin Şeyhoğlu Stadium, Karabük
- Capacity: 11,378
- League: Turkish Regional Amateur League
- 2021–22: TFF 3. Lig, Group 3, 17th (relegated)
Home colours	Away colours

Kardemir Demir Çelik Karabükspor, known simply as Kardemir Karabükspor or Karabükspor, was a Turkish sports club based in Karabük. The team was founded in 1969 after a merger between "Karabük Gençlikspor" and "Demir Çelik Spor". The club had branches in football, wheelchair basketball and volleyball. The nickname of the club was Mavi Ateş (Blue Flame), based on the unfading blue flames of chimneys from the Kardemir iron-steel works located in the city. As the factory gives its name to the club, the team was regarded as a blue collar worker's team. The club finances collapsed during the 2017–18 Süper Lig season, setting the club on a path of constant relegation, losing almost every game as they could play nothing but amateur youth players. The club became unable to field teams and were ultimately banned from the amateur leagues which led to dissolution as a club.

In 2023 a form of successor phoenix club was created under the name Karabük İdman Yurdu. Adatepe Dökecekspor, an amateur club also in Karabük, won promotion to the Regional Amateur League. Before the 2023/24 season began, to better represent the city the club leadership elected to change the name to Karabük İdman Yurdu (Karabük Sports Club). There was also an adjustment of their match kit, team colours and logo to add the red stripes of the original Kardemir side.

== History ==
=== Foundation and early history ===
In the year 1938, Azmi Tılabar, the head manager of the Turkish iron-steel industry, founded DÇ Gençlik Kulübü; DÇ Youth Club with grey-blue colours. In these times, the trainer of the football team was an English engineer Mr. Lain. The trainer of athleticism was Turkish athlete Faik Önen. Moreover, Mersinli Ahmet and Yaşar Doğu were trainers of wrestling. During the 1940s, Karabükspor became a symbol in cycling, tennis, and wrestling around Turkey. Starting in the 1950s, the "Karabük Gençlikspor" joined "DÇ Gençlik Kulübü" and finally, the club got its colours as red-blue.

=== The 1990s ===
In the last game of the 1993–94 season against Zeytinburnuspor, Karabükspor relegated from the Süper Lig. Karabükspor promoted to the top tier after winning the promotion play-off in the 1996–97 season. Karabükspor finished 8th in 1997–98. The next season, however, was disastrous for them as they again relegated to the second level. Karabükspor relocated to the Second League B Category in the 2001–02 season.

=== The 2000s ===
The team was promoted to the TFF First League in the 2007–08 season after a 7–0 win against Erzurumspor in the promotion group. On their 30th game of the 2009–10 season, they won 3–0 against Çaykur Rizespor which meant they were promoted to the Süper Lig after 11 years.

=== 2017-2018 relegation ===
The 2017–18 Süper Lig season was a disaster for the club and resulted in their relegation. Erkan Sözeri resigned following poor early performances. On 1 October 2017 the club appointed Australian coach Tony Popovic to run the side. His stint in charge lasted 2 months, during which time the entire board quit the club. Popovic was replaced by Levent Açıkgöz, who was himself sacked on 21 March 2018 and replaced by Ünal Karaman. The coaching changes, financial ruin and poor performances all contributed to the club finishing in last place with only three wins and three draws for the entire season.

=== Relegation freefall ===
With no money and little in the way of talent to sell, the club's precarious financial position required them to use low paid youth players, and this saw Karabükspor suffer back to back relegations. They finished last in the 2018/19 TFF First League, winning no games, drawing only three and suffering a negative 102 goal difference. They finished the season with zero points after a 3-point administrative penalty was assessed on the club.

The 2019/20 season, where the club competed in the 3rd tier TFF Second League, saw a brief respite from relegation as the Turkish government suspended all the leagues due to the COVID-19 pandemic in Turkey, with relegations cancelled for the season.

They continued their plunge down the pyramid with another last place finish, in the 2020/21 season. They scored just one win and three draws, while another 3 point administrative penalty had them end the season on only 3 points. They were relegated into the fourth tier TFF Third League system.

Their season in the 4th tier did not see any improvement, and the side were relegated once again, this time into the 5th tier amateur league system.

In October 2022, the club was unable to field a team two games in a row due to player shortages, a situation which was punished by an automatic relegation to the 6th tier amateur league system. The team were then dissolved.

== Karabük İdman Yurdu successor club ==
Fellow local side Adatepe Dökecekspor have since renamed itself to Karabük İdman Yurdu after winning a promotion in 2022/23. Following that season they changed the name, colours, shirt & logo to be similar to what Kardemir Karabükspor used to use. They play at the same Dr. Necmettin Şeyhoğlu Stadium.

== Past seasons ==
=== Domestic results ===
Season	Place	League
1969–70	9	TFF Second League
1970–71	4	TFF Second League
1971–72	1	TFF Second League
1972–73	15	TFF First League
1973–74	2	TFF Second League
1974–75	5	TFF First League
1975–76	6	TFF First League
1976–77	6	TFF First League
1977–78	7	TFF First League
1978–79	12	TFF First League
1979–80	5	TFF First League
1980–81	10	TFF First League
1981–82	6	TFF First League
1982–83	12	TFF First League
1983–84	1	Amateur Level
1984–85	10	TFF First League
1985–86	13	TFF First League
1986–87	10	TFF First League
1987–88	4	TFF First League
1988–89	7	TFF First League
1989–90	7	TFF First League
1990–91	14	TFF First League
1991–92	5	TFF First League
1992–93	3	TFF First League
1993–94	14	Süper Lig
1994–95	5	TFF First League
1995–96	2	TFF First League
1996–97	1	TFF First League
1997–98	9	Süper Lig
1998–99	18	Süper Lig
1999–00	1	TFF First League
2000–01	5	TFF First League
2001–02	1	TFF Second League
2002–03	11	TFF Second League
2003–04	2	TFF Second League
2004–05	7	TFF Second League
2005–06	3	TFF Second League
2006–07	3	TFF Second League
2007–08	2	TFF Second League
2008–09	7	TFF First League
2009–10	1	TFF First League
2010–11	9	Süper Lig
2011–12	12	Süper Lig
2012–13	15	Süper Lig
2013–14	7	Süper Lig
2014–15	16	Süper Lig
2015–16	2	TFF First League
2016–17	12	Süper Lig
2017–18	18	Süper Lig
2018–19	18	TFF First League
2019–20	18	TFF Second League
2020–21	20	TFF Second League
2021–22	17	TFF Third League

Note: In the 2019/20 season all relegations were postponed due to the Coronavirus pandemic causing the cancellation of the season, while promotions continued as normal. Additional relegation slots were added to the 2020–21 season to rebalance the size of the leagues for the 2021/22 season.

=== League participations ===
- Süper Lig: 1993–94, 1997–99, 2010–15, 2016–18
- TFF First League: 1972–73, 1974–83, 1984–93, 1994–97, 1999–01, 2008–10, 2015–16, 2018–19
- TFF Second League: 1969–72, 1973–74, 1983–84, 2001–08, 2019–21
- TFF Third League: 2021–2022
- Regional Amateur League: 2022
- Amateur League: 1983–84

== European record ==
As of 28 August 2014

Competition	Pld	W	D	L	GF	GA	GD
UEFA Europa League	4	1	2	1	2	2	0

UEFA Europa League:

Season	Competition	Round	Club	Home	Away	Aggregate
2014–15	UEFA Europa League	3Q	(Norway) Rosenborg	0–0	1–1	1–1 (a)
2014–15	UEFA Europa League	PO	(France) Saint-Étienne	1–0	0–1	1–1, 3–4 (pen.)

Notes

- 3Q: Third qualifying round
- PO: Play-off round

Ranking history:

As of 2019

Season	Rank	Points	Ref.
2015	199 ▲	8.020	
2016	185 ▲	8.420	
2017	169 ▲	9.340	
2018	154 ▲	7.160	
2019	159 ▼	6.920	

== Supporters ==
The club were sponsored by the Kardemir company and the Iron workers unions from whom they draw a lot of their support, making it a club with true working class identity. Their ultra group is called Mavi Ateş (Blue Flame) and their motto is, Dumanlı kentin puslu çocukları (Sons of the smoky city). They continued to support the club despite the ongoing difficulty before it dissolved and many continue to support the phoenix club that plays at the same stadium. These supporters include Çelik-iş Sendikası, the labor union of the workers in Kardemir Iron & Steel Works.

== Notable players ==
Africa
Burkina Faso

- (Burkina Faso) Abdou Traoré

Cameroon

- (Cameroon) Dany Nounkeu

DR Congo

- (Democratic Republic of the Congo) Lomana LuaLua

Gabon

- (Gabon) André Poko

Mali

- (Mali) Mustapha Yatabaré
- (Mali) Samba Sow

Nigeria

- (Nigeria) Emmanuel Emenike

Europe
Bosnia and Herzegovina

- (Bosnia and Herzegovina) Sanel Jahić
- (Bosnia and Herzegovina) Ermin Zec

Montenegro

- (Montenegro) Vladimir Rodić

Norway

- (Norway) Morten Gamst Pedersen

Turkey

- (Turkey) Hüseyin Çakıroğlu
- (Turkey) Bilal Kısa
- (Turkey) Osman Çelik
- (Turkey) Musa Çağıran

Ukraine

- (Ukraine) Yevhen Seleznyov

South America
Argentina

- (Argentina) Luis Ibáñez
