= Haydar Yılmaz =

Turkish footballer

Personal information
- Date of birth: 19 January 1984 (age 42)
- Place of birth: Susurluk, Turkey
- Height: 1.87 m (6 ft 2 in)
- Position: Goalkeeper

Team information
- Current team: Karşıyaka
- Number: 1

Senior career*
Years	Team	Apps	(Gls)
2004–2005	Eskişehir Şekerspor	14	(0)
2005–2007	İnegölspor	12	(0)
2007–2008	Gaziosmanpaşaspor	32	(0)
2009–2010	Tarsus İdman Yurdu	35	(0)
2010–2011	Şanlıurfaspor	10	(0)
2011–2013	Kartalspor	16	(0)
2013–2020	Alanyaspor	175	(0)
2020	→ Gaziantep (loan)	1	(0)
2020–2021	Tuzlaspor	19	(0)
2021–2022	Pendikspor	30	(0)
2022–2023	Vanspor	35	(0)
2023–	Karşıyaka	3	(0)
- * Club domestic league appearances and goals as of 23 September 2023

Haydar Yılmaz (born 19 January 1984) is a Turkish professional footballer who plays as a goalkeeper for Karşıyaka.
