= Dr. Necmettin Şeyhoğlu Stadium =

Football stadium in Karabük, Turkey

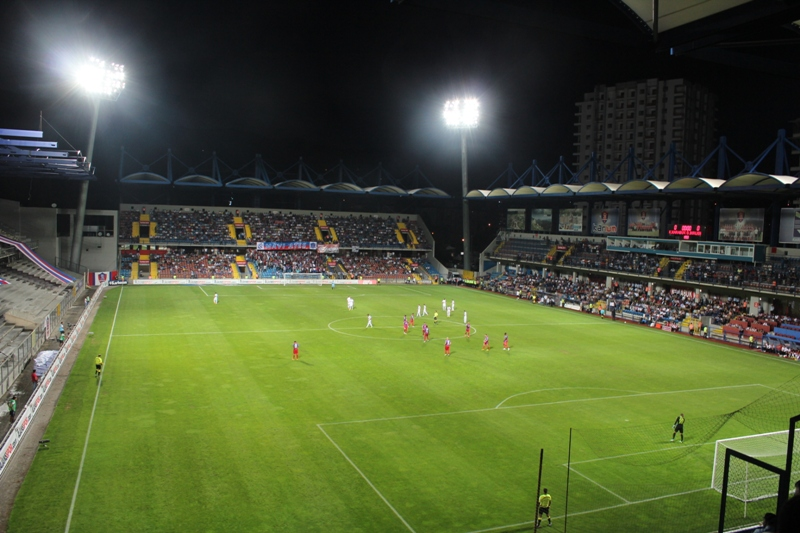
- Interactive map of Dr. Necmettin Şeyhoğlu Stadium
- Location: Karabük, Turkey
- Coordinates: 41°12′16″N 32°37′12″E
- Capacity: 11,378

Construction
- Opened: 1950's

Tenants
- Karabükspor (-2023); Karabük İdman Yurdu (2015-present)

Dr. Necmettin Şeyhoğlu Stadium, is a football stadium in Karabük, Turkey. It is used for football matches for Karabük İdman Yurdu, a phoenix club created in 2022/23 after long term tenant Karabükspor's financial troubles led to it being dissolved.

In 2010 the stadium began renovations which finished in 2014. Each stand was demolished and rebuilt.
