= Levent Açıkgöz =

Turkish footballer and manager

Personal information
- Date of birth: January 4, 1971 (age 55)
- Place of birth: Zonguldak, Turkey
- Position: Defender

Senior career*
Years	Team	Apps	(Gls)
1990–1996	Kardemir Karabükspor	122	(2)
1990–1991	→Turhalspor (loan)	25	(0)
1996–1997	Kocaelispor	1	(0)
1996–1997	→Diyarbakırspor (loan)	12	(0)
1997–1999	Giresunspor	31	(1)
1998–1999	→Zeytinburnuspor (loan)	32	(2)
1999–2001	Ağrıspor	35	(0)
2001	İzmitspor	6	(1)
2001–2002	Boluspor	26	(0)
2002–2004	Çankırıspor	42	(2)

Managerial career
- 2010–2017: Kardemir Karabükspor (youth)
- 2017–2018: Kardemir Karabükspor
- * Club domestic league appearances and goals as of 12 March 2018 ‡ National team caps and goals as of 29 March 2018

Levent Açıkgöz (born 4 January 1971) is a retired Turkish footballer and football manager. Levent is best known for his association with Kardemir Karabükspor where he played with in the Süper Lig and TFF First League, and also begun his professional managerial career.

== Managerial career ==
Levent has taken on a role as a caretaker coach for Karabükspor on several occasions after previous managers quit the club. His usual position was as a youth coach.
