= Kofi Amoako Atta =

Ghanaian footballer

Personal information
- Date of birth: 28 March 1997 (age 29)
- Place of birth: Accra, Ghana
- Height: 1.85 m (6 ft 1 in)
- Position: Midfielder

Team information
- Current team: Atlético Pulpileño

Youth career
- Crystal Palace Ghana
- Spartans FC Ghana
- 2017: Bursaspor

Senior career*
Years	Team	Apps	(Gls)
2017–2018	Bursaspor	3	(0)
2018	→ Giresunspor (loan)	4	(1)
2018–2019	Extremadura B	0	(0)
2018–2019	→ Don Benito (loan)	6	(0)
2019–2020	Don Benito	5	(0)
2020–2021	Lealtad	32	(1)
2021–2022	Torrijos	23	(3)
2022–2023	Athletic Torrellano	24	(1)
2023	Alcalá	11	(0)
2024	Calvo Sotelo	18	(3)
2024–2025	Toledo	28	(3)
2025–	Atlético Pulpileño	10	(3)
- * Club domestic league appearances and goals as of 9 November 2025

Kofi Amoako Atta (born 17 June 1997) is a Ghanaian footballer who plays as a midfielder for Spanish Tercera Federación club Atlético Pulpileño.

== Career ==
Atta moved to Turkey from the lower divisions in Ghana as a youth player. Atta signed his first professional contract on 6 September 2017. Atta made his professional debut for Bursaspor in a 3–0 Süper Lig win over Akhisar Belediyespor on 10 September 2017.

On 31 January 2018, he was loaned out to Giresunspor for the rest of the season.
