= 2012–13 Fenerbahçe S.K. season =

Fenerbahçe
2012–13 season
- President: Aziz Yıldırım
- Head coach: Aykut Kocaman
- Stadium: Şükrü Saracoğlu Stadium
- Süper Lig: 2nd
- Turkish Cup: Winners
- Turkish Super Cup: Runners-up (lost to Galatasaray)
- UEFA Champions League: Play-off round (lost to Spartak Moscow)
- UEFA Europa League: Semi-finals (lost to Benfica)
- Top goalscorer: League: Moussa Sow (15); All: Moussa Sow (19)
- Highest home attendance: 50,025 vs. Galatasaray (12 May 2013, Süper Lig)
- Lowest home attendance: 5,000 vs. Sivasspor (19 December 2012, Türkiye Kupası)
| Home colours | Away colours | Third colours |

The 2012–13 season is Fenerbahçe's 55th consecutive season in the Süper Lig and their 106th year in existence. They also competed in the UEFA Champions League starting in the third qualifying round after being second in the 2011–12 domestic season.

== Season overview ==
- 3 June 2012, Kuyt joined the team 3 years from Liverpool.
- 6 June 2012, Salih joined to team.
- 22 June 2012, UEFA sent a letter to the TFF approving Fenerbahçe's participation in the UEFA Champions League, the European football body's topflight club competition. On the same day Hasan Ali joined the team.
- 1 July 2012, Mehmet Topal joined the team with a contract of 4 years from Valencia
- 2 July 2012, Fenerbahçe's chairman Aziz Yıldırım and three other jailed suspects were released after the chief judge of the specially authorized 16th İstanbul High Criminal Court, Mehmet Ekinci, delivered the verdict in a year-long match-fixing case on Monday, but the court stated that Aziz Yıldırım has been sentenced to six years, three months for creating and managing a criminal organization and for rigging several football matches. The decision has been forwarded to the Supreme Court of Appeals for review.
- 3 July 2012, Fenerbahçe football players all sported T-shirts with Fenerbahçe Chairman Aziz Yıldırım pictured on the front, along with a message he sent them from within prison, at their first pre-season training session on Tuesday. The players unfurled a banner that read “Fenerbahçe forever” and posed for members of the press while holding it.
- 4 July 2012, Egemen joined the team, and on 9 July 2012 Issiar Dia transferred to the Qatars team Lekhwiya with the transfer fee €4 Million.
- 16 July 2012, for the pre-season camp Fenerbahçe team was going to Austria, here they will play four Friendly games.
- 20 July 2012, Fenerbahçe get Vaslui from Romania in the draw for the Third qualifying round of the Champions League.
- 1 August 2012, in the season's first match the club salvage late draw against Vaslui in the Third qualifying round of the Champions League, with the score being 1-1.
- 3 August 2012, Krasić transferred for 7M € on a four-year contract.
- 4 August 2012, Joseph Yobo signs three-year contract with the club.
- 8 August 2012, the club celebrate its first win of the season in the second leg against Vaslui in the Third Qualifying round of the Champions League, winning 4-1 on the night and 5-2 on aggregate to advance to the play-off round.
- 10 August 2012, the club are drawn against Russian side Spartak Moscow in the Play-off roundof the Champions League.
- 12 August 2012 Fenerbahçe lose the Süper Kupa against local rivals Galatasaray 3–2.
- 18 August 2012, in 2012–13 season's Süper Lig first match Fenerbahçe late a draw against Elazığspor with score 1–1. On 21 August 2012, Fenerbahçe lose the play-off round's first match against Spartak Moscow with score 2–1 in UEFA Champions League.
- 27 August 2012, defeated southeastern side Gaziantepspor 3–0 in week two of the Süper Lig on Saturday night for its first domestic league of the season and also for its first win in four official matches. But Saturday's victory was eclipsed by the crisis between Brazilian captain and playmaker Alex and young coach Aykut Kocaman, which saw the Brazilian excluded completely from the Saturday roster. For the record: A fit Alex has always been included in the starting XI since he joined the Istanbul club in 2004. Therefore, without the slightest doubt there is something wrong somewhere. The match was played “behind closed doors,” meaning adult men were banned, while women and children were allowed in for free. And even the female spectators took sides, asking, “Say Aykut Kocaman, where is Alex?” And this prompted Fenerbahçe Chairman Aziz Yıldırım to grab the stadium microphone during the match maybe something unprecedented in football history and say the following: “You are mistaken,” he said to the chanting fans. “Respect and support the players on the pitch. No one is greater than Fenerbahçe,” he asserted. Yıldırım further said after the match: “I can give my life for Fenerbahçe. No one is above Fenerbahçe, not even Aziz Yıldırım. Players go, Aziz Yıldırım will, everyone will go, but Fenerbahçe will remain,” he noted. He later said he has invited Alex for talks on Monday.
- 29 August 2012, Fenerbahçe was eliminated by Spartak Moscow with aggregate score 3–2 and will enter the group stage of the 2012–13 UEFA Europa League.
- 1 October 2012, Alex's contract was terminated.
- 29 October 2012, Antalyaspor ends Fenerbahçe's 47-match unbeaten run in the Süper Lig at Şükrü Saracoğlu Stadium in Kadıköy had to come to an end some day with score 1–3. Fenerbahçe had not lost a single match at home in Kadıköy ever since they were beaten 2–3 by eventual champion Bursaspor in week 22, on 22 February 2010. Fenerbahçe won 38 and drew nine in the 47 matches they played within 980 days since 22 February 2010. On 3 November 2012, Fenerbahçe peck Akhisar Belediyespor to break 181-day away jinx.
- 2 May 2013, Fenerbahçe was eliminated by Benfica with aggregate score 3–2 in 2012–13 Europa League in semi-final, and this is the biggest success in Fenerbahçe's history to arrive into the Semi-final in European competitions.

== Kits ==
Fenerbahçe's 2012–13 kits introduced on 27 July 2012 in Şükrü Saracoğlu Stadium and produced by Adidas. Home kit's name is "2013 Efsane Çubuklu Forma" that means 2013 Legendary Barred Kit, away kit's name is "2013 Arma Forma" that means 2013 Emblem Kit and third kit's name is "2013 Gölge Kanarya Forma" that means 2013 Shadow Canary Kit.

- Supplier: Adidas
- Main sponsor: Türk Telekom
- Back sponsor: Ülker
- Sleeve sponsor: Avea
- Short sponsor: –
- Socks sponsor: –

== Transfers ==
=== In ===
| No. | Pos. | Nat. | Name | Age | Moving from | Type | Transfer window | Ends | Transfer fee | Source |
|---|---|---|---|---|---|---|---|---|---|---|
| 11 | FW | (Netherlands) | Dirk Kuyt | 31 | Liverpool | Transfer | Summer | 2015 | €1M | Fenerbahce.org |
| 48 | MF | (Turkey) | Salih Uçan | 18 | Bucaspor | Transfer | Summer | 2017 | €1.55M | Fenerbahce.org |
| 3 | DF | (Turkey) | Hasan Ali Kaldırım | 22 | Kayserispor | Transfer | Summer | 2017 | €3.75M | Fenerbahce.org |
| 5 | MF | (Turkey) | Mehmet Topal | 26 | Valencia | Transfer | Summer | 2016 | €4.5M | Fenerbahce.org |
| 2 | DF | (Turkey) | Egemen Korkmaz | 29 | Beşiktaş | Transfer | Summer | 2015 | Free | Fenerbahce.org |
| 27 | MF | (Serbia) | Miloš Krasić | 27 | Juventus | Transfer | Summer | 2016 | €7M | Fenerbahce.org |
| 6 | DF | (Nigeria) | Joseph Yobo | 31 | Everton | Transfer | Summer | 2015 | €2.5M | Fenerbahce.org |
| 14 | MF | (Portugal) | Raul Meireles | 29 | Chelsea | Transfer | Summer | 2016 | €10 | Fenerbahce.org |
| 8 | MF | (Turkey) | Emre Belözoğlu | 32 | Atlético Madrid | Transfer | Winter | 2015 | €0.35M | Fenerbahce.org |
| 33 | DF | (Switzerland) | Reto Ziegler | 27 | Juventus | Loan | Winter | 2013 | €0.25M | Fenerbahce.org |
| 99 | FW | (Cameroon) | Pierre Webó | 31 | İstanbul Başakşehir | Transfer | Winter | 2015 | €3M | Fenerbahce.org |

Total spending: ▼€33.9 million

=== Out ===
| No. | Pos. | Nat. | Name | Age | Moving to | Type | Transfer window | Transfer fee | Source |
|---|---|---|---|---|---|---|---|---|---|
| 5 | MF | (Turkey) | Emre Belözoğlu | 31 | Atlético Madrid | Sell | Summer | Free | Atleticomadrid.com |
| 17 | DF | (Turkey) | Okan Alkan | 19 | Bucaspor | Sell | Summer | Free | Bucaspor.org.tr |
| 22 | GK | (Turkey) | Ertuğrul Taşkıran | 22 | Kayserispor | Loan | Summer | Free | Kayserispor.org |
| 58 | DF | (Brazil) | Bilica | 33 | Elazığspor | Sell | Summer | Free | Elazigspor.org.tr |
| 92 | MF | (Senegal) | Issiar Dia | 25 | Lekhwiya | Sell | Summer | €4M | Lekhwiyaclub.qa |
| 14 | MF | (Turkey) | Gökay Iravul | 19 | Manisaspor | Loan | Summer | Free | Manisaspor.org.tr |
| 99 | FW | (Turkey) | Recep Berk Elitez | 20 | Bandırmaspor | Loan | Summer | Free | Bandirmaspor.org.tr |
| 35 | DF | (Turkey) | Hasan Erbey | 20 | Giresunspor | Loan | Summer | Free | Giresunspor.org.tr |
| 8 | MF | (Turkey) | Özer Hurmacı | 25 | Kasımpaşa | Annulled | Summer | Free | Fenerbahce.org |
| 10 | MF | (Brazil) | Alex | 34 | Coritiba | Annulled | Summer | Free | Kap.gov.tr |
| 10 | MF | (Turkey) | Özgür Çek | 22 | Eskişehirspor | Annulled | Winter | Free | Ligtv.com.tr |
| 15 | FW | (Cameroon) | Henri Bienvenu | 24 | Zaragoza (Spain) | Loan | Winter | Free | Henri-bienvenu.com |

Total spending: ▲€4 million

== Line-up ==
As of 22 May 2013

| No. | Pos. | Nat. | Name | MS | Notes |
|---|---|---|---|---|---|
| 1 | GK | (Turkey) | Volkan Demirel | 46 | (Note: Mert Günok has 13 starts, Serkan Kırıntılı has 5 starts) |
| 77 | RB | (Turkey) | Gökhan Gönül | 47 | (Note: Orhan Şam has 13 starts, Mehmet Topuz has 3 starts, Bekir İrtegün has 1 start) |
| 6 | CB | (Nigeria) | Joseph Yobo | 34 | (Note: Bekir İrtegün has 18 starts, Serdar Kesimal has 11 starts, Mehmet Topal has 1 start) |
| 2 | CB | (Turkey) | Egemen Korkmaz | 39 | (Note: Bekir İrtegün has 21 starts, Serdar Kesimal has 3 starts, Orhan Şam has 1 start) |
| 3 | LB | (Turkey) | Hasan Ali Kaldırım | 41 | (Note: Reto Ziegler has 17 starts, Caner Erkin has 4 starts, Özgür Çek has 2 starts) |
| 14 | CM | (Portugal) | Raul Meireles | 31 | (Note: Selçuk Şahin has 19 starts, Mehmet Topal has 10 starts, Cristian has 5 starts) |
| 25 | CM | (Turkey) | Emre Belözoğlu | 12 | (Note: Mehmet Topal has 36 starts, Salih Uçan has 8 starts, Selçuk Şahin has 4 starts, Caner Erkin has 3 starts, Mehmet Topuz has 1 start) |
| 16 | AM | (Brazil) | Cristian | 37 | (Note: Alex has 9 starts, Salih Uçan has 5 starts, Mehmet Topuz has 4 starts, Sezer Öztürk has 3 starts, Recep Niyaz has 1 starts, Selçuk Şahin has 1 start, Raul Meireles has 2 starts, Caner Erkin has 2 starts) |
| 11 | RW | (Netherlands) | Dirk Kuyt | 39 | (Note: Mehmet Topuz has 15 starts, Miloš Krasić has 8 starts, Moussa Sow has 2 starts) |
| 7 | LW | (Senegal) | Moussa Sow | 16 | (Note: Miroslav Stoch has 18 starts, Caner Erkin has 18 starts, Miloš Krasić has 6 starts, Dirk Kuyt has 6 starts) |
| 99 | CF | (Cameroon) | Pierre Webó | 21 | (Note: Moussa Sow has 27 starts, Semih Şentürk has 9 starts, Dirk Kuyt has 6 starts, Henri Bienvenu has 1 start) |

== First team squad ==
| No. | Name | Nationality | Position(s) | Date of birth (age) | Signed from | Since |
Goalkeepers
| 1 | Volkan Demirel | (Turkey) | GK | 27 October 1981 (aged 31) | Kartalspor | 2002 |
| 34 | Mert Günok | (Turkey) | GK | 1 March 1989 (aged 24) | Youth system | 2009 |
| 54 | Erten Ersu | (Turkey) | GK | 21 April 1994 (aged 19) | Youth system | 2011 |
| 85 | Serkan Kırıntılı | (Turkey) | GK | 15 February 1985 (aged 28) | Ankaragücü | 2010 |
Defenders
| 2 | Egemen Korkmaz | (Turkey) | DF | 3 November 1982 (aged 30) | Beşiktaş | 2012 |
| 3 | Hasan Ali Kaldırım | (Turkey) | DF | 9 December 1989 (aged 23) | Kayserispor | 2012 |
| 4 | Bekir İrtegün | (Turkey) | DF | 20 April 1984 (aged 29) | Gaziantepspor | 2009 |
| 6 | Joseph Yobo | (Nigeria) | DF | 6 September 1980 (aged 32) | Everton | 2010 |
| 33 | Reto Ziegler | (Switzerland) | DF | 16 January 1986 (aged 27) | Juventus | 2013 |
| 53 | Serdar Kesimal | (Turkey) | DF | 24 January 1989 (aged 24) | Kayserispor | 2011 |
| 67 | Orhan Şam | (Turkey) | DF | 1 June 1986 (aged 26) | Gençlerbirliği | 2011 |
| 77 | Gökhan Gönül | (Turkey) | DF | 5 January 1985 (aged 28) | Hacettepe | 2007 |
Midfielders
| 5 | Mehmet Topal | (Turkey) | MF | 3 March 1986 (aged 27) | Valencia | 2012 |
| 9 | Miroslav Stoch | (Slovakia) | MF | 19 October 1989 (aged 23) | Chelsea | 2010 |
| 14 | Raul Meireles | (Portugal) | MF | 17 March 1983 (aged 30) | Chelsea | 2012 |
| 16 | Cristian | (Brazil) | MF | 25 June 1983 (aged 29) | Corinthians | 2009 |
| 17 | Recep Niyaz | (Turkey) | MF | 2 August 1995 (aged 17) | Youth system | 2011 |
| 20 | Sezer Öztürk | (Turkey) | MF | 3 November 1985 (aged 27) | Eskişehirspor | 2011 |
| 21 | Selçuk Şahin | (Turkey) | MF | 31 January 1981 (aged 32) | Istanbulspor | 2003 |
| 25 | Emre Belözoğlu | (Turkey) | MF | 7 September 1980 (aged 32) | Atlético Madrid | 2013 |
| 27 | Miloš Krasić | (Serbia) | MF | 1 November 1984 (aged 28) | Juventus | 2012 |
| 28 | Beykan Şimşek | (Turkey) | MF | 1 January 1995 (aged 18) | Youth system | 2013 |
| 38 | Mehmet Topuz | (Turkey) | MF | 7 September 1983 (aged 29) | Kayserispor | 2009 |
| 48 | Salih Uçan | (Turkey) | MF | 6 January 1994 (aged 19) | Bucaspor | 2012 |
| 88 | Caner Erkin | (Turkey) | MF | 4 October 1988 (aged 24) | CSKA Moscow | 2010 |
Forwards
| 7 | Moussa Sow | (Senegal) | FW | 19 January 1986 (aged 27) | Lille | 2012 |
| 11 | Dirk Kuyt | (Netherlands) | FW | 22 June 1980 (aged 32) | Liverpool | 2012 |
| 23 | Semih Şentürk | (Turkey) | FW | 29 April 1983 (aged 30) | Youth system | 1999 |
| 99 | Pierre Webó | (Cameroon) | FW | 20 January 1982 (aged 31) | İstanbul Başakşehir | 2013 |

== Squad statistics ==
As of 22 May 2013

| No. | Nat. | Player | Süper Lig | | Turkish Cup^{1} | | Europe | | Total | |
| No. | Nat. | Player | Apps | Goals | Apps | Goals | Apps | Goals | Apps | Goals |
|---|---|---|---|---|---|---|---|---|---|---|
| 1 | (Turkey) | Volkan Demirel | 28 | 0 | 3 | 0 | 15 | 0 | 46 | 0 |
| 2 | (Turkey) | Egemen Korkmaz | 20 | 0 | 8 | 0 | 14 | 2 | 42 | 2 |
| 3 | (Turkey) | Hasan Ali Kaldırım | 25 | 1 | 8 | 0 | 9 | 0 | 42 | 1 |
| 4 | (Turkey) | Bekir İrtegün | 26 | 1 | 7 | 0 | 11 | 2 | 44 | 3 |
| 5 | (Turkey) | Mehmet Topal | 27 | 3 | 8 | 1 | 16 | 0 | 51 | 4 |
| 6 | (Nigeria) | Joseph Yobo | 20 | 0 | 2 | 0 | 12 | 0 | 34 | 0 |
| 7 | (Senegal) | Moussa Sow | 31 | 15 | 7 | 1 | 16 | 3 | 54 | 19 |
| 9 | (Slovakia) | Miroslav Stoch | 18 | 0 | 6 | 0 | 9 | 0 | 33 | 0 |
| 11 | (Netherlands) | Dirk Kuyt | 31 | 8 | 8 | 2 | 17 | 7 | 56 | 17 |
| 14 | (Portugal) | Raul Meireles | 22 | 2 | 3 | 0 | 8 | 1 | 33 | 3 |
| 16 | (Brazil) | Cristian | 31 | 5 | 10 | 3 | 18 | 3 | 59 | 11 |
| 17 | (Turkey) | Recep Niyaz | 2 | 0 | 3 | 1 | 2 | 0 | 7 | 1 |
| 20 | (Turkey) | Sezer Öztürk | 9 | 2 | 3 | 3 | 0 | 0 | 12 | 5 |
| 21 | (Turkey) | Selçuk Şahin | 13 | 1 | 8 | 1 | 14 | 0 | 35 | 2 |
| 23 | (Turkey) | Semih Şentürk | 17 | 1 | 8 | 3 | 2 | 0 | 27 | 4 |
| 25 | (Turkey) | Emre Belözoğlu | 10 | 2 | 2 | 0 | 0 | 0 | 12 | 2 |
| 27 | (Serbia) | Miloš Krasić | 13 | 0 | 7 | 1 | 7 | 0 | 27 | 1 |
| 28 | (Turkey) | Beykan Şimşek | 1 | 0 | 2 | 1 | 0 | 0 | 3 | 1 |
| 33 | (Switzerland) | Reto Ziegler | 7 | 0 | 2 | 0 | 8 | 0 | 17 | 0 |
| 34 | (Turkey) | Mert Günok | 6 | 0 | 4 | 0 | 3 | 0 | 13 | 0 |
| 38 | (Turkey) | Mehmet Topuz | 22 | 1 | 11 | 0 | 13 | 0 | 46 | 1 |
| 48 | (Turkey) | Salih Uçan | 10 | 3 | 9 | 0 | 7 | 1 | 26 | 4 |
| 53 | (Turkey) | Serdar Kesimal | 5 | 0 | 8 | 0 | 2 | 0 | 15 | 0 |
| 54 | (Turkey) | Erten Ersu | 0 | 0 | 0 | 0 | 0 | 0 | 0 | 0 |
| 67 | (Turkey) | Orhan Şam | 5 | 0 | 9 | 0 | 1 | 0 | 15 | 0 |
| 77 | (Turkey) | Gökhan Gönül | 27 | 3 | 6 | 1 | 17 | 0 | 48 | 4 |
| 85 | (Turkey) | Serkan Kırıntılı | 0 | 0 | 5 | 0 | 0 | 0 | 5 | 0 |
| 88 | (Turkey) | Caner Erkin | 30 | 0 | 7 | 1 | 16 | 3 | 53 | 4 |
| 99 | (Cameroon) | Pierre Webó | 13 | 7 | 3 | 1 | 6 | 2 | 22 | 10 |
Players sold or loaned out after the start of the season
| 10 | (Brazil) | Alex | 4 | 0 | 1 | 1 | 4 | 1 | 9 | 2 |
| 15 | (Cameroon) | Henri Bienvenu | 2 | 0 | 0 | 0 | 3 | 0 | 5 | 0 |
| 60 | (Turkey) | Özgür Çek | 0 | 0 | 1 | 0 | 1 | 0 | 2 | 0 |

^{1}Includes 2012 Turkish Super Cup

== Statistics ==
=== Top scorers ===
As of 22 May 2013

| Place | Position | Nation | Number | Name | Süper Lig | Turkish Cup^{1} | Europe | Total |
|---|---|---|---|---|---|---|---|---|
| 1 | FW | (Senegal) | 7 | Moussa Sow | 15 | 1 | 3 | 19 |
| 2 | FW | (Netherlands) | 11 | Dirk Kuyt | 8 | 2 | 7 | 17 |
| 3 | MF | (Brazil) | 16 | Cristian | 5 | 3 | 3 | 11 |
| 4 | FW | (Cameroon) | 99 | Pierre Webó | 7 | 1 | 2 | 10 |
| 5 | MF | (Turkey) | 20 | Sezer Öztürk | 2 | 3 | 0 | 5 |
| 6 | DF | (Turkey) | 77 | Gökhan Gönül | 3 | 1 | 0 | 4 |
| 6 | MF | (Turkey) | 5 | Mehmet Topal | 3 | 1 | 0 | 4 |
| 6 | MF | (Turkey) | 48 | Salih Uçan | 3 | 0 | 1 | 4 |
| 6 | MF | (Turkey) | 23 | Semih Şentürk | 1 | 3 | 0 | 4 |
| 6 | MF | (Turkey) | 88 | Caner Erkin | 0 | 1 | 3 | 4 |
| 7 | MF | (Portugal) | 14 | Raul Meireles | 2 | 0 | 1 | 3 |
| 7 | DF | (Turkey) | 4 | Bekir İrtegün | 1 | 0 | 2 | 3 |
| 8 | MF | (Turkey) | 25 | Emre Belözoğlu | 2 | 0 | 0 | 2 |
| 8 | MF | (Turkey) | 21 | Selçuk Şahin | 1 | 1 | 0 | 2 |
| 8 | MF | (Brazil) | 10 | Alex ^{2} | 0 | 1 | 1 | 2 |
| 8 | DF | (Turkey) | 2 | Egemen Korkmaz | 0 | 0 | 2 | 2 |
| 9 | DF | (Turkey) | 3 | Hasan Ali Kaldırım | 1 | 0 | 0 | 1 |
| 9 | MF | (Turkey) | 38 | Mehmet Topuz | 1 | 0 | 0 | 1 |
| 9 | MF | (Turkey) | 17 | Recep Niyaz | 0 | 1 | 0 | 1 |
| 9 | MF | (Serbia) | 27 | Miloš Krasić | 0 | 1 | 0 | 1 |
| 9 | MF | (Turkey) | 28 | Beykan Şimşek | 0 | 1 | 0 | 1 |
| Own goals | | | | | 1 | 1 | 0 | 2 |
| TOTALS | | | | | 56 | 22 | 25 | 103 |

^{1}Includes 2012 Turkish Super Cup

^{2}Players who no longer play for Fenerbahçe's current season

=== Cards ===
As of 22 May 2013

| Number | Position | Nation | Name | Yellow card | Red card | Total |
|---|---|---|---|---|---|---|
| 88 | MF | (Turkey) | Caner Erkin | 14 | 1 | 15 |
| 14 | MF | (Portugal) | Raul Meireles | 11 | 2 | 13 |
| 4 | DF | (Turkey) | Bekir İrtegün | 13 | 0 | 13 |
| 2 | DF | (Turkey) | Egemen Korkmaz | 10 | 0 | 10 |
| 5 | MF | (Turkey) | Mehmet Topal | 10 | 0 | 10 |
| 16 | MF | (Brazil) | Cristian | 9 | 0 | 9 |
| 77 | DF | (Turkey) | Gökhan Gönül | 7 | 1 | 8 |
| 3 | DF | (Turkey) | Hasan Ali Kaldırım | 6 | 0 | 6 |
| 23 | FW | (Turkey) | Semih Şentürk | 6 | 0 | 6 |
| 21 | MF | (Turkey) | Selçuk Şahin | 6 | 0 | 6 |
| 1 | GK | (Turkey) | Volkan Demirel | 5 | 1 | 6 |
| 53 | DF | (Turkey) | Serdar Kesimal | 5 | 0 | 5 |
| 38 | MF | (Turkey) | Mehmet Topuz | 3 | 1 | 4 |
| 48 | MF | (Turkey) | Salih Uçan | 4 | 0 | 4 |
| 11 | FW | (Netherlands) | Dirk Kuyt | 4 | 0 | 4 |
| 25 | MF | (Turkey) | Emre Belözoğlu | 4 | 0 | 4 |
| 10 | MF | (Brazil) | Alex^{1} | 3 | 0 | 3 |
| 9 | MF | (Slovakia) | Miroslav Stoch | 3 | 0 | 3 |
| 99 | FW | (Cameroon) | Pierre Webó | 3 | 0 | 3 |
| 20 | MF | (Turkey) | Sezer Öztürk | 2 | 0 | 2 |
| 7 | FW | (Senegal) | Moussa Sow | 2 | 0 | 2 |
| 33 | DF | (Switzerland) | Reto Ziegler | 2 | 0 | 2 |
| 67 | DF | (Turkey) | Orhan Şam | 2 | 0 | 2 |
| 27 | MF | (Serbia) | Miloš Krasić | 1 | 0 | 1 |
| 6 | DF | (Nigeria) | Joseph Yobo | 1 | 0 | 1 |
| 34 | GK | (Turkey) | Mert Günok | 1 | 0 | 1 |

^{1}Players who no longer play for Fenerbahçe's current season

== Club hierarchy ==
=== Board of directors ===
| President | Aziz Yıldırım |
| Deputy President | Abdullah Kiğılı |
| Chief executive officer (CEO) | Hakkı Hasan Yılmaz |
| Investment and Projects | Nihat Özbağı |
| Football Department | Ali Yıldırım |
| Financial and Administrative Restructuring | Ender Alkaya |
| Social Affairs and The Associations | Mithat Yenigün |
| The Stadium and Facilities | Ömer Temelli |
| Departments except Football | İlhan Ekşioğlu |
| Accountant Member | Tahir Perek |
| Advertising / Marketing / Fundraising | İsfendiyar Zülfikari |
| General Secretary | Talat Yılmaz |
| Legal Affairs | Şekip Mosturoğlu |
| Legal Affairs | Tolga Aytöre |
| Football teams except the senior | Ersan Topbaş |
| Basketball Department | Semih Özsoy |

Source: Fenerbahce.org

=== Management ===
| Manager | Aykut Kocaman |
| Administrative Manager | Hasan Çetinkaya |
| Assistant Coach | İsmail Kartal |
| Assistant Coach | Fahrudin Omerović |
| Coach | Turgay Altay |
| Physical Fitness Coach | Alper Aşçı |
| Goalkeeper Coach | Murat Öztürk |
| Match Analyst Coach | Arda Keskin |
| Match Analyst Coach | Barış Karakoç |
| Individual Player Coach | Dolu Arslan |
| Doctor | Burak Kunduracıoğlu |
| Physiotherapist | Erdem Yörükoğlu |
| Physiotherapist | Umut Şahin |
| Physiotherapist | Ata Özgür Ercan |

Source: Fenerbahce.org

== Pre-season friendlies ==
Win Draw Loss Postponed

| 18 July 2012 Friendly | MTK (Hungary) | 1–1 | (Turkey) Fenerbahçe | Wiener Neustadt |
| 20:00 EET | Kanta 24' | Report | Alex 45' | Stadium: Stadion Wiener Neustadt; Attendance: N/A; Referee: N/A |

| 21 July 2012 Friendly | Newcastle United (England) | 1–1 | (Turkey) Fenerbahçe | Ritzing |
| 19:00 EET | Abeid 76' | Report | Cristian 90' | Stadium: Ritzing Sonnenseestadion; Attendance: N/A; Referee: N/A |

| 23 July 2012 Friendly | Dinamo Tbilisi (Georgia (country)) | 0–0 | (Turkey) Fenerbahçe | Graz |
| 20:00 EET | | Report | | Stadium: UPC-Arena; Attendance: N/A; Referee: N/A |

| 25 July 2012 Friendly | Wisła Kraków (Poland) | 0–0 | (Turkey) Fenerbahçe | Ritzing |
| 20.00 EET | | Report | | Stadium: Ritzing Sonnenseestadion; Attendance: N/A; Referee: N/A |
Note: Preparatory match was interrupted due to heavy rain.

| 8 January 2013 Friendly | Genk (Belgium) | 1–1 | (Turkey) Fenerbahçe | Belek |
| 20:00 EET | Gorius 33' | Report | Erkin 9' | Stadium: Belek Arcadia Hotel Stadium; Attendance: N/A; Referee: N/A |

== Competitions ==
=== Overall ===
| Competition | Started round | Current position / round | Final position / round | First match | Last match |
|---|---|---|---|---|---|
| Turkish Super Cup | Final | — | Runner-up | 12 August 2012 | |
| Süper Lig | — | — | 2nd | 19 August 2012 | 19 May 2013 |
| Turkish Cup | Fourth round | Semi final | | 27 November 2012 | 22 May 2013 |
| UEFA Champions League | Third qualifying round | — | play-off round | 1 August 2012 | 29 August 2012 |
| UEFA Europa League | Group stage | — | Semi finals | 20 September 2012 | 2 May 2013 |

=== Super Cup ===
Win Draw Loss Postponed

| 12 August 2012 Final | Galatasaray | 3–2 | Fenerbahçe | Erzurum |
| 20:55 EET | Bulut 19', 58'; Baytar (red card) 67'; İnan 90' (pen.), (yellow card) 90+4' | Report | Alex (yellow card) 45+1', (goal) 45+2'; Kuyt 66'; Şam (yellow card) 70'; İrtegün (yellow card) 76'; Topuz (yellow card) 80' | Stadium: Erzurum Universiade Arena; Attendance: 25,000; Referee: Cüneyt Çakır |

=== Süper Lig ===
==== League table ====
| Pos | Team | Pld | W | D | L | GF | GA | GD | Pts | Qualification or relegation |
|---|---|---|---|---|---|---|---|---|---|---|
| 1 | Galatasaray (C) | 34 | 21 | 8 | 5 | 66 | 35 | +31 | 71 | Qualification for the Champions League group stage |
| 2 | Fenerbahçe | 34 | 18 | 7 | 9 | 56 | 39 | +17 | 61 | Qualification for the Champions League third qualifying round |
| 3 | Beşiktaş | 34 | 16 | 10 | 8 | 63 | 49 | +14 | 58 | Qualification for the Europa League play-off round |
| 4 | Bursaspor | 34 | 14 | 13 | 7 | 52 | 41 | +11 | 55 | Qualification for the Europa League third qualifying round |
| 5 | Kayserispor | 34 | 15 | 7 | 12 | 48 | 45 | +3 | 52 | |

Rules for classification: 1) points; 2) goal difference; 3) number of goals scored.
(C) Champions

==== Results summary ====
| Overall | | | | | | | | Home | | | | | | Away | | | | | |
| Pld | W | D | L | GF | GA | GD | Pts | W | D | L | GF | GA | GD | W | D | L | GF | GA | GD |
|---|---|---|---|---|---|---|---|---|---|---|---|---|---|---|---|---|---|---|---|
| 34 | 18 | 7 | 9 | 56 | 39 | +17 | 61 | 12 | 2 | 3 | 35 | 18 | +17 | 6 | 5 | 6 | 21 | 21 | 0 |

==== Results by round ====
| Round | 1 | 2 | 3 | 4 | 5 | 6 | 7 | 8 | 9 | 10 | 11 | 12 | 13 | 14 | 15 | 16 | 17 | 18 | 19 | 20 | 21 | 22 | 23 | 24 | 25 | 26 | 27 | 28 | 29 | 30 | 31 | 32 | 33 | 34 |
|---|---|---|---|---|---|---|---|---|---|---|---|---|---|---|---|---|---|---|---|---|---|---|---|---|---|---|---|---|---|---|---|---|---|---|
| Ground | A | H | A | H | H | A | H | A | H | A | H | A | H | A | H | A | H | H | A | H | A | A | H | A | H | A | H | A | H | A | H | A | H | A |
| Result | D | W | D | W | D | L | W | D | L | W | W | D | W | D | W | L | L | D | W | L | W | W | W | L | W | W | W | W | W | L | W | L | W | L |
| Position | 6 | 1 | 5 | 4 | 3 | 6 | 5 | 6 | 8 | 6 | 3 | 4 | 2 | 4 | 2 | 3 | 4 | 4 | 3 | 4 | 3 | 2 | 2 | 3 | 3 | 2 | 2 | 2 | 2 | 2 | 2 | 2 | 2 | 2 |

A = Away; H = Home; W = Win; D = Draw; L = Loss

==== Matches ====
Win Draw Loss Postponed

| 18 August 2012 1 | Elazığspor | 1–1 | Fenerbahçe | İzmir |
| 21.45 EET | Bayrak (yellow card) 32' (yellow-red card) 66'; Ertuğrul (yellow card) 42'; Tum 50', (yellow card) 86'; Badur (yellow card) 63'; Kayalı (yellow card) 65' | Report | İrtegün (yellow card) 51'; Kuyt 65'; Erkin (yellow card) 75'; Alex (yellow card) 82' | Stadium: İzmir Atatürk Stadium; Attendance: N/A; Referee: Tolga Özkalfa |

| 25 August 2012 2 | Fenerbahçe | 3–0 | Gaziantepspor | Istanbul |
| 21:45 EET | Topal (yellow card) 28', (goal) 32'; Sow 79'; Kuyt 84' | Report | | Stadium: Şükrü Saracoğlu Stadium; Attendance: N/A; Referee: Halis Özkahya |

| 2 September 2012 3 | Sivasspor | 0–0 | Fenerbahçe | Sivas |
| 18:00 EET | Rajnoch (yellow card) 76'; Chahechouhe (yellow card) 83' | Report | Topal (yellow card) 78' | Stadium: Sivas 4 Eylül Stadium; Attendance: N/A; Referee: Yunus Yıldırım |

| 16 September 2012 4 | Fenerbahçe | 2–1 | Mersin İdman Yurdu | Istanbul |
| 20:30 EET | Gönül (yellow card) 6'; Topal 45'; Stoch (yellow card) 85'; Cristian 89', (yellow card) 90' | Report | Ben Yahia 7', (yellow card) 90+3' (yellow-red card) 90+4'; Toscalı (yellow card) 34'; Ozokwo (yellow card) 80' | Stadium: Şükrü Saracoğlu Stadium; Attendance: N/A; Referee: Hüseyin Göçek |

| 24 September 2012 5 | Fenerbahçe | 0–0 | Trabzonspor | Istanbul |
| 20:00 EET | Meireles (yellow card) 57' | Report | Zokora (yellow card) 23'; Özbek (yellow card) 90' | Stadium: Şükrü Saracoğlu Stadium; Attendance: N/A; Referee: Fırat Aydınus |

| 29 September 2012 6 | Kasımpaşa | 2–0 | Fenerbahçe | Istanbul |
| 19:00 EET | Süme (yellow card) 55'; Uche 73'; Kala 77' | Report | | Stadium: Recep Tayyip Erdoğan Stadium; Attendance: N/A; Referee: İlker Meral |

| 7 October 2012 7 | Fenerbahçe | 3–0 | Beşiktaş | Istanbul |
| 19:00 EET | Sow 13'; Kaldırım (yellow card) 31'; Gönül 40', 59'; Korkmaz (yellow card) 44'; Cristian (yellow card) 61'; Demirel (yellow card) 84' | Report | Boral (yellow card) 21'; Kavlak (yellow card) 52' (yellow-red card) 56'; Toraman (yellow card) 60' | Stadium: Şükrü Saracoğlu Stadium; Attendance: N/A; Referee: Özgür Yankaya |

| 20 October 2012 8 | Bursaspor | 1–1 | Fenerbahçe | Bursa |
| 19:00 EET | Kesimal 12' | Report | Sow 23'; Kesimal (yellow card) 90+1' | Stadium: Bursa Atatürk Stadium; Attendance: 25,661; Referee: Yunus Yıldırım |

| 29 October 2012 9 | Fenerbahçe | 1–3 | Antalyaspor | Istanbul |
| 20:00 EET | Sow 49'; Kesimal (yellow card) 53'; İrtegün (yellow card) 60' | Report | Diarra 41', 45'; Tita (yellow card) 48'; Barış 80' | Stadium: Şükrü Saracoğlu Stadium; Attendance: N/A; Referee: Mete Kalkavan |

| 3 November 2012 10 | Akhisar Belediye | 1–2 | Fenerbahçe | Manisa |
| 19:00 EET | Atan 18'; Mezenga (yellow card) 22'; Sertan (yellow card) 28'; Sonko (yellow card) 49'; Özer (yellow card) 56' | Report | Gönül (yellow card) 17'; Kuyt 25'; Şahin 29', (yellow card) 59' | Stadium: Manisa 19 Mayıs Stadium; Attendance: N/A; Referee: Bülent Yıldırım |

| 11 November 2012 11 | Fenerbahçe | 2–1 | Orduspor | Istanbul |
| 19:00 EET | Sow 11'; Öztürk 83' | Report | Monje (yellow card) 39'; Turan (yellow card) 41'; Cinaz 90+1' | Stadium: Şükrü Saracoğlu Stadium; Attendance: N/A; Referee: Halis Özkahya |

| 17 November 2012 12 | Eskişehirspor | 1–1 | Fenerbahçe | Eskişehir |
| 19:00 EET | Ateş 40+5' (pen.); Potuk (yellow card) 89'; Diego Ângelo (yellow card) 90' | Report | Erkin (red card) 27'; Sow 57'; Meireles (yellow card) 73' | Stadium: Eskişehir Atatürk Stadium; Attendance: N/A; Referee: Fırat Aydınus |

| 25 November 2012 13 | Fenerbahçe | 4–1 | Gençlerbirliği | Istanbul |
| 19:00 EET | Meireles (yellow card) 19', (goal) 63'; Sow 44'; Kaldırım (yellow card) 58'; Kuyt 73'; Öztürk 78'; Şentürk (yellow card) 89' | Report | Demir 20'; Azofeifa (yellow card) 89' | Stadium: Şükrü Saracoğlu Stadium; Attendance: N/A; Referee: Fırat Aydınus |

| 2 December 2012 14 | Kayserispor | 1–1 | Fenerbahçe | Kayseri |
| 19:00 EET | Cleyton (yellow card) 50'; Riveros (yellow card) 52'; Bobô 84' | Report | Topal (yellow card) 57'; Kuyt 89'; Öztürk (yellow card) 90' | Stadium: Kadir Has Stadium; Attendance: N/A; Referee: Tolga Özkalfa |

| 9 December 2012 15 | Fenerbahçe | 2–1 | İstanbul Başakşehir | Istanbul |
| 19:00 EET | Cristian 5', (yellow card) 18'; Gönül (yellow card) 45'; Sow (yellow card) 45'; Kaldırım (yellow card) 60'; İrtegün 79', (yellow card) 79' | Report | Webó 19'; Zayatte (yellow card) 31'; Višća (yellow card) 84' | Stadium: Şükrü Saracoğlu Stadium; Attendance: N/A; Referee: Süleyman Abay |

| 16 December 2012 16 | Galatasaray | 2–1 | Fenerbahçe | Istanbul |
| 20:00 EET | İrtegün 10' (o.g.); Nounkeu (yellow card) 20'; İnan 36', (yellow card) 78' | Report | Meireles (yellow card) 21' (yellow-red card) 82'; Kaldırım 23'; Öztürk (yellow card) 72'; Topal (yellow card) 79' | Stadium: Türk Telekom Arena; Attendance: 51,311; Referee: Halis Özkahya |

| 22 December 2012 17 | Fenerbahçe | 1–3 | Karabükspor | Istanbul |
| 19:00 EET | İrtegün (yellow card) 28'; Kuyt 75'; Kaldırım (yellow card) 88' | Report | İncedemir (yellow card) 14'; Parlak 38'; LuaLua 41', 69'; Šerić (yellow card) 45' | Stadium: Şükrü Saracoğlu Stadium; Attendance: N/A; Referee: Bülent Yıldırım |

| 20 January 2013 18 | Fenerbahçe | 2–2 | Elazığspor | Istanbul |
| 19:00 EET | Gönül (red card) 55'; Topuz (yellow card) 57' (yellow-red card) 90'; Sow 68'; Topal 90+3' | Report | Jervis 11'; Yedek 27'; Ak (yellow card) 35'; Gürler (yellow card) 49'; Zeegelaar (red card) 55'; Iveša (yellow card) 67'; Bayrak (yellow card) 87' | Stadium: Şükrü Saracoğlu Stadium; Attendance: 38,000; Referee: İlker Meral |

| 26 January 2013 19 | Gaziantepspor | 1–2 | Fenerbahçe | Gaziantep |
| 19:00 EET | Šernas 42', (yellow card) 43'; Kurtuluş (yellow card) 54' | Report | Sow 65'; Şentürk 83', (yellow card) 84' | Stadium: Gaziantep Kamil Ocak Stadium; Attendance: 13,500; Referee: Mustafa Kamil Abitoğlu |

| 3 February 2013 20 | Fenerbahçe | 1–2 | Sivasspor | Istanbul |
| 19:00 EET | Kuyt (penalty missed) 38'; Webó 55'; Şentürk (yellow card) 90' | Report | Eneramo 12', 90+4', (yellow card) 66'; Chahechouhe (yellow card) 21'; Kılıç (yellow card) 65' | Stadium: Şükrü Saracoğlu Stadium; Attendance: N/A; Referee: Cüneyt Çakır |

| 9 February 2013 21 | Mersin İdman Yurdu | 0–1 | Fenerbahçe | Mersin |
| 16:30 EET | Lawal (yellow card) 82' | Report | Webó 45'; Meireles (yellow card) 89' | Stadium: Tevfik Sırrı Gür Stadium; Attendance: 6,500; Referee: Cüneyt Çakır |

| 17 February 2013 22 | Trabzonspor | 0–3 | Fenerbahçe | Trabzon |
| 19:00 EET | Colman (yellow card) 35'; Čelůstka (yellow card) 64'; Kaçar (yellow card) 73' | Report | Bamba 11' (o.g.); Cristian 26'; Topal (yellow card) 39'; Gönül 52'; Kaldırım (yellow card) 62' | Stadium: Hüseyin Avni Aker Stadium; Attendance: 20,000; Referee: Bülent Yıldırım |

| 24 February 2013 23 | Fenerbahçe | 3–1 | Kasımpaşa | Istanbul |
| 19:00 EET | Belözoğlu (yellow card) 35', (goal) 90' (pen.); Webó 60'; Sow 90+5'; Demirel (yellow card) 90+5' | Report | Uche 2' (pen.); Djalma (yellow card) 26'; Ernst (yellow card) 49'; Çolak (yellow card) 71'; Isaksson (yellow card) 87'; Ayhan (yellow card) 89' | Stadium: Şükrü Saracoğlu Stadium; Attendance: 48,500; Referee: Hüseyin Sabancı |

| 3 March 2013 24 | Beşiktaş | 3–2 | Fenerbahçe | Istanbul |
| 19:00 EET | Kuyt 40' (o.g.); Süzen (yellow card) 44'; Niang 61'; Kavlak (yellow card) 65'; Özkan (yellow card) 65'; Şahan 90+3' | Report | Korkmaz (yellow card) 15'; Sow 24', 63'; İrtegün (yellow card) 70'; Belözoğlu (yellow card) 74'; Erkin (yellow card) 87' | Stadium: BJK İnönü Stadium; Attendance: 30,000; Referee: Mete Kalkavan |

| 10 March 2013 25 | Fenerbahçe | 4–1 | Bursaspor | Istanbul |
| 19:00 EET | Belözoğlu 12'; Demirel (yellow card) 45'; Meireles 51', (yellow card) 58'; Kuyt 75'; Sow 88'; Topal (yellow card) 90' | Report | Šesták 2'; Çağıran (yellow card) 24'; Carson (yellow card) 52'; Öztürk (yellow card) 84' | Stadium: Şükrü Saracoğlu Stadium; Attendance: 48,500; Referee: Tolga Özkalfa |

| 17 March 2013 26 | Antalyaspor | 1–2 | Fenerbahçe | Antalya |
| 20:00 EET | Nizam (yellow card) 27'; Tita 32' | Report | Uçan 11', (yellow card) 90'; Sow 42', (yellow card) 90'; Gönül (yellow card) 55' | Stadium: Akdeniz Üniversitesi Stadium; Attendance: 7,000; Referee: Hüseyin Göçek |

| 31 March 2013 27 | Fenerbahçe | 2–0 | Akhisar Belediye | Istanbul |
| 19:00 EET | Webó 47'; İrtegün (yellow card) 79'; Sow 83'; Stoch (yellow card) 90' | Report | Vardar (yellow card) 80' | Stadium: Şükrü Saracoğlu Stadium; Attendance: 42,000; Referee: Mustafa Kamil Abitoğlu |

| 7 April 2013 28 | Orduspor | 0–2 | Fenerbahçe | Ordu |
| 19:00 EET | Yussuf (yellow card) 32'; Barral (yellow card) 68' | Report | Uçan 37', 57'; Erkin (yellow card) 60' | Stadium: 19 Eylül Stadium; Attendance: 9,500; Referee: İlker Meral |

| 14 April 2013 29 | Fenerbahçe | 1–0 | Eskişehirspor | Istanbul |
| 19:00 EET | Meireles (yellow card) 37'; Cristian 52'; Kuyt (yellow card) 82' | Report | Sarı (yellow card) 28'; Potuk (yellow card) 51'; Kamara (yellow card) 77'; Güçer (yellow card) 90' | Stadium: Şükrü Saracoğlu Stadium; Attendance: 46,500; Referee: Bülent Yıldırım |

| 21 April 2013 30 | Gençlerbirliği | 2–0 | Fenerbahçe | Ankara |
| 20:00 EET | Demir 5', (yellow card) 5'; Vleminckx 41', (yellow card) 80'; Tomić (yellow card) 50'; Petrović (yellow card) 90' | Report | Gönül (yellow card) 90' | Stadium: Ankara 19 Mayıs Stadium; Attendance: N/A; Referee: Mustafa Kamil Abitoğlu |

| 28 April 2013 31 | Fenerbahçe | 2–1 | Kayserispor | Istanbul |
| 20:00 EET | Kuyt 57'; Erkin (yellow card) 75'; Cristian 89' (pen.) | Report | Cleyton 6'; Gülselam (yellow card) 35'; Dursun (yellow card) 70'; Yılmaz (yellow card) 80'; Güngör (yellow card) 90' | Stadium: Şükrü Saracoğlu Stadium; Attendance: 40,000; Referee: Kuddusi Müftüoğlu |

| 5 May 2013 32 | İstanbul Başakşehir | 2–0 | Fenerbahçe | Istanbul |
| 20:00 EET | Sokullu 36'; Korkmaz (yellow card) 89'; Topuz 90' (o.g.) | Report | Cristian (yellow card) 56'; Erkin (yellow card) 79' | Stadium: Atatürk Olympic Stadium; Attendance: 13,000; Referee: Bülent Yıldırım |

| 12 May 2013 33 | Fenerbahçe | 2–1 | Galatasaray | Istanbul |
| 20:00 EET | Gönül (yellow card) 24'; Webó 33', 36'; Erkin (yellow card) 84'; Demirel (red card) 90' | Report | Yılmaz 25' (pen.); Drogba (yellow card) 38'; Zan (yellow card) 85'; Sarıoğlu (red card) 90' | Stadium: Şükrü Saracoğlu Stadium; Attendance: 50,025; Referee: Cüneyt Çakır |

| 18 May 2013 34 | Karabükspor | 3–2 | Fenerbahçe | Karabük |
| 19:00 EET | İncedemir (yellow card) 12'; Özgenç (yellow card) 20'; Šerić (yellow card) 23'; LuaLua 48' (pen.), 77'; Özek 50'; Demircan (yellow card) 51'; Söyler (yellow card) 85'; Tomić (yellow card) 89' | Report | Topuz 33'; Günok (yellow card) 48'; Webó 75' | Stadium: Yenişehir Stadium; Attendance: N/A; Referee: Mustafa Kamil Abitoğlu |

=== Turkish Cup ===
Win Draw Loss Postponed

| 28 November 2012 Fourth round | Fenerbahçe | 1–0 | Pendikspor | Istanbul |
| 20:30 EET | Öztürk 45'; Uçan (yellow card) 75'; Korkmaz (yellow card) 90' | Report | Evren (yellow card) 70' | Stadium: Şükrü Saracoğlu Stadium; Attendance: N/A; Referee: Hüseyin Sabancı |

| 12 December 2012 Fifth round | Fenerbahçe | 4–0 | Göztepe | Istanbul |
| 20:30 EET | Öztürk 16', 47'; Kesimal (yellow card) 41'; Krasić 54', (yellow card) 83'; Niyaz 88' | Report | Gezmiş (yellow card) 84' | Stadium: Şükrü Saracoğlu Stadium; Attendance: N/A; Referee: Mustafa İlker Coşkun |

=== Group stage ===
8 winners from the fifth and the last qualifying round will be split into two groups of 4 teams. This stage will be a round-robin tournament with home and away matches, in the vein of UEFA European competitions' group stages. The winners and runners-up of the two groups will advance to the semi-finals.

==== Group A ====
| Pos | Team | Pld | W | D | L | GF | GA | GD | Pts | FEN | SİV | 1461 | BUR |
|---|---|---|---|---|---|---|---|---|---|---|---|---|---|
| 1 | Fenerbahçe | 6 | 4 | 1 | 1 | 12 | 5 | +7 | 13 | | 2–0 | 2–3 | 3–0 |
| 2 | Sivasspor | 6 | 3 | 2 | 1 | 6 | 5 | +1 | 11 | 0–0 | | 2–1 | 2–1 |
| 3 | 1461 Trabzon | 6 | 1 | 2 | 3 | 5 | 9 | −4 | 5 | 0–2 | 1–1 | | 0–0 |
| 4 | Bursaspor | 6 | 1 | 1 | 4 | 5 | 9 | −4 | 4 | 2–3 | 0–1 | 2–0 | |

Legend: Blue = home team win; Yellow = draw; Red = away team win.

==== Matches ====
Win Draw Loss Postponed

| 19 December 2012 1 | Fenerbahçe | 2–0 | Sivasspor | Istanbul |
| 20:30 EET | Cristian 66', 84' | Report | Güven (yellow card) 50'; Kılıç (penalty missed) 87' | Stadium: Şükrü Saracoğlu Stadium; Attendance: 5,000; Referee: Özgür Yankaya |

| 13 January 2013 2 | 1461 Trabzon | 0–2 | Fenerbahçe | Trabzon |
| 20.30 EET | Kuruoğlu (yellow card) 24'; Öztürk (yellow card) 45'; Erdoğan (yellow card) 82'; Tiryaki (yellow card) 89' | Report | Cristian (yellow card) 24'; Şam (yellow card) 30'; Şahin (yellow card) 45'; Kesimal (yellow card) 71'; Şentürk 84', (yellow card) 85'; Kuyt 87' | Stadium: Hüseyin Avni Aker Stadium; Attendance: 15,000; Referee: Suat Arslanboğa |

| 16 January 2013 3 | Bursaspor | 2–3 | Fenerbahçe | Bursa |
| 20:30 EET | Pinto 59'; Çağıran (yellow card) 59'; Gönül 70' (o.g.); Özbayraklı (yellow card) 90' | Report | Gönül 10'; Şahin (yellow card) 36'; İrtegün (yellow card) 77'; Özbayraklı 79' (o.g.); Cristian 80'; Şentürk (yellow card) 81' | Stadium: Bursa Atatürk Stadium; Attendance: 19,000; Referee: Yunus Yıldırım |

| 23 January 2013 4 | Fenerbahçe | 3–0 | Bursaspor | Istanbul |
| 20:30 EET | Meireles (yellow card) 32'; Şentürk 41' (pen.), 61'; Şimşek 32' | Report | Tufan (yellow card) 67' | Stadium: Şükrü Saracoğlu Stadium; Attendance: 22,500; Referee: Yunus Yıldırım |

| 30 January 2013 5 | Sivasspor | 0–0 | Fenerbahçe | Sivas |
| 18.30 EET | Pedriel (yellow card) 89' | Report | Uçan (yellow card) 17'; Meireles (yellow card) 31'; Erkin (yellow card) 51'; İrtegün (yellow card) 66' | Stadium: Sivas 4 Eylül Stadium; Attendance: 5,000; Referee: Serkan Çınar |

| 27 February 2013 6 | Fenerbahçe | 2–3 | 1461 Trabzon | Istanbul |
| 20:30 EET | Erkin 32', (yellow card) 58'; Şahin 40'; Kesimal (yellow card) 60' | Report | Tiryaki 36'; Yusuf 66'; Gökhan (yellow card) 73'; Jebrin (yellow card) 80', (goal) 86'; Mehmet (yellow card) 90' | Stadium: Şükrü Saracoğlu Stadium; Attendance: N/A; Referee: Hakan Ceylan |

==== Semi-finals ====
Win Draw Loss Postponed

| 17 April 2013 First leg | Eskişehirspor | 1–1 | Fenerbahçe | Eskişehir |
| 21.15 EET | Zengin 13'; Diego Ângelo (yellow card) 20'; Akaminko (yellow card) 24'; Boffin (yellow card) 63'; Kamara (yellow card) 86' | Report | Topal 20', (yellow card) 54'; Şam (yellow card) 28'; Şentürk (yellow card) 63'; Şahin (yellow card) 63'; Erkin (yellow card) 88' | Stadium: Eskişehir Atatürk Stadium; Attendance: 12,400; Referee: Yunus Yıldırım |

| 8 May 2013 Second leg | Fenerbahçe | 1–1 (a.e.t.) (2–2 agg.) (4−1 p) | Eskişehirspor | Istanbul |
| 21.30 EET | Webó 32'; Belözoğlu (yellow card) 71' | Report | Tello 17'; Zengin (yellow card) 116' | Stadium: Şükrü Saracoğlu Stadium; Attendance: 22,500; Referee: Hüseyin Göçek |
| | Penalties |
| | Cristian (penalty scored); Kuyt (penalty scored); Webó (penalty scored); Topuz (penalty scored) | | (penalty scored) Diego Ângelo; (penalty missed) Ateş; (penalty missed) Čaušić |

==== Final ====
Win Draw Loss Postponed

| 22 May 2013 Final | Fenerbahçe | 1–0 | Trabzonspor | Ankara |
| 20:45 EET | Sow 9'; Belözoğlu (yellow card) 45'; Kuyt (yellow card) 70' | Report | Zokora (yellow card) 14' | Stadium: Ankara 19 Mayıs Stadium; Attendance: 18,250; Referee: Fırat Aydınus |

=== UEFA Champions League ===
==== Third qualifying round ====
Win Draw Loss Postponed

| 1 August 2012 First leg | Fenerbahçe (Turkey) | 1–1 | (Romania) Vaslui | Istanbul |
| 21:45 EET | Korkmaz (yellow card) 22'; Cristian (yellow card) 27'; Alex (yellow card) 44'; İrtegün (yellow card) 83', (goal) 90' | Report | Antal 75'; Sburlea (yellow card) 83' | Stadium: Şükrü Saracoğlu Stadium; Attendance: 38,993; Referee: Antonio Mateu Lahoz (Spain) |

| 8 August 2012 Second leg | Vaslui (Romania) | 1–4 (2–5 agg.) | (Turkey) Fenerbahçe | Piatra Neamț, Romania |
| 21.00 EET | Niculae 14'; N'Doye (yellow card) 40', (penalty missed) 54'; Milanov (yellow card) 76' | Report | Erkin 12', (yellow card) 42'; Kaldırım (yellow card) 58'; Kuyt 71', 76'; Stoch (yellow card) 73'; Sow 90+2' | Stadium: Stadionul Ceahlăul (Note: Vaslui will play their home match at Stadionul Ceahlaul, Piatra Neamț as their own Stadionul Municipal did not meet UEFA criteria.); Attendance: 11,005; Referee: Sergei Karasev (Russia) |

==== Play-off round ====
Win Draw Loss Postponed

| 21 August 2012 First leg | Spartak Moscow (Russia) | 2–1 | (Turkey) Fenerbahçe | Moscow, Russia |
| 20:00 MSK (UTC+4) | Emenike 59'; Kombarov 69'; De Zeeuw (yellow card) 74'; Bilyaletdinov (yellow card) 76' | Report | Korkmaz (yellow card) 19'; Kuyt 65', (yellow card) 90' | Stadium: Luzhniki Stadium; Attendance: 31,600; Referee: Martin Atkinson (England) |

| 29 August 2012 Second leg | Fenerbahçe (Turkey) | 1–1 (2–3 agg.) | (Russia) Spartak Moscow | Istanbul |
| 21:45 EET | Topuz (yellow card) 29'; Kuyt (yellow card) 33'; Sow 69'; Korkmaz (yellow card) 85' | Report | Ari 5'; De Zeeuw (yellow card) 15' (yellow-red card) 81'; Kombarov (yellow card) 37'; Dzyuba (yellow card) 85' | Stadium: Şükrü Saracoğlu Stadium; Attendance: 40,387; Referee: Felix Brych (Germany) |

=== UEFA Europa League ===
==== Group stage ====
===== Group C =====
| Pos | Team | Pld | W | D | L | GF | GA | GD | Pts | Qualification | FEN | MGB | OM | AEL |
|---|---|---|---|---|---|---|---|---|---|---|---|---|---|---|
| 1 | (Turkey) Fenerbahçe | 6 | 4 | 1 | 1 | 10 | 7 | +3 | 13 | Advance to knockout phase | — | 0–3 | 2–2 | 2–0 |
| 2 | (Germany) Borussia Mönchengladbach | 6 | 3 | 2 | 1 | 11 | 6 | +5 | 11 | Advance to knockout phase | 2–4 | — | 2–0 | 2–0 |
| 3 | (France) Marseille | 6 | 1 | 2 | 3 | 9 | 11 | −2 | 5 | | 0–1 | 2–2 | — | 5–1 |
| 4 | (Cyprus) AEL Limassol | 6 | 1 | 1 | 4 | 4 | 10 | −6 | 4 | | 0–1 | 0–0 | 3–0 | — |

Source: Soccerway

===== Matches =====
Win Draw Loss Postponed

| 20 September 2012 1 | Fenerbahçe (Turkey) | 2–2 | (France) Marseille | Istanbul |
| 20:00 EET | Erkin 28'; Alex 57'; İrtegün (yellow card) 71' | Report | Amalfitano (yellow card) 64'; Valbuena 83'; J. Ayew (yellow card) 83'; A. Ayew (yellow card) 38', (goal) 90+4' | Stadium: Şükrü Saracoğlu Stadium; Attendance: 47,000; Referee: Ivan Bebek (Croatia) |

| 4 October 2012 2 | Borussia Mönchengladbach (Germany) | 2–4 | (Turkey) Fenerbahçe | Mönchengladbach, Germany |
| 21:05 CET | De Jong 18', (yellow card) 79'; De Camargo 74'; Marx (yellow card) 78' | Report | Cristian 25', 87'; Gönül (yellow card) 29'; Korkmaz (yellow card) 32'; Meireles 40'; Kuyt 71'; Erkin (yellow card) 76' | Stadium: Borussia-Park; Attendance: 46,279; Referee: Fernando Teixeira (Spain) |

| 25 October 2012 3 | AEL Limassol (Cyprus) | 0–1 | (Turkey) Fenerbahçe | Nicosia, Cyprus |
| 22:05 EET | Monteiro (yellow card) 25'; Dedé (yellow card) 82'; Júnior (yellow card) 84' | Report | Korkmaz (yellow card) 19', (goal) 72'; Topal (yellow card) 22' | Stadium: GSP Stadium (Note: AEL Limassol will play their home matches at GSP Stadium, Nicosia instead of their regular stadium, Tsirion Stadium, Limassol.); Attendance: 9,287; Referee: Alexandru Tudor (Romania) |

| 8 November 2012 4 | Fenerbahçe (Turkey) | 2–0 | (Cyprus) AEL Limassol | Istanbul |
| 20:00 EET | Kuyt 11'; Sow 41'; Meireles (yellow card) 64'; Erkin (yellow card) 89' | Report | Carlitos (yellow card) 51'; Konstantinou (yellow card) 55'; Ouon (red card) 69' | Stadium: Şükrü Saracoğlu Stadium; Attendance: 33,284; Referee: Kristinn Jakobsson (Iceland) |

| 22 November 2012 5 | Marseille (France) | 0–1 | (Turkey) Fenerbahçe | Marseille, France |
| 21:05 CET | Mendes (yellow card) 12'; J. Ayew (yellow card) 74'; A. Ayew (yellow card) 88' | Report | İrtegün 39', (yellow card) 79'; Topal (yellow card) 87' | Stadium: Stade Vélodrome; Attendance: 14,686; Referee: Martin Atkinson (England) |

| 6 December 2012 6 | Fenerbahçe (Turkey) | 0–3 | (Germany) Borussia Mönchengladbach | Istanbul |
| 20:00 EET | | Report | Ciğerci 23'; Hanke 28' (pen.); De Jong 79' | Stadium: Şükrü Saracoğlu Stadium; Attendance: 23,995; Referee: Jorge Sousa (Portugal) |

=== Knockout phase ===
==== Round of 32 ====
Win Draw Loss Postponed

| 14 February 2013 First leg | BATE (Belarus) | 0–0 | (Turkey) Fenerbahçe | Grodno, Belarus |
| 20:00 EET | Radkov (yellow card) 65' | Report | Meireles (red card) 4'; Demirel (yellow card) 5'; Webó (yellow card) 10'; İrtegün (yellow card) 62' | Stadium: Neman (Note: BATE Borisov played their home matches at Neman, Grodno instead of their regular stadium, Haradski Stadium, Barysaw.); Attendance: 7,150; Referee: Alan Kelly (Ireland) |

| 21 February 2013 Second leg | Fenerbahçe (Turkey) | 1–0 (1–0 agg.) | (Belarus) BATE | Istanbul |
| 22:05 EET | Korkmaz (yellow card) 25'; Cristian 45+1' (pen.); Uçan (yellow card) 57'; Yobo (yellow card) 76'; Şahin (yellow card) 90'; Demirel (yellow card) 90' | Report | Valadzko (yellow card) 9'; Baha (yellow card) 18' (yellow-red card) 20'; Harbunow (yellow card) 45'; Bardachow (yellow card) 47'; Alyakhnovich (yellow card) 64' | Stadium: Şükrü Saracoğlu Stadium; Attendance: None; Referee: Antony Gautier (France) |

==== Round of 16 ====
Win Draw Loss Postponed

| 7 March 2013 First leg | Viktoria Plzeň (Czech Republic) | 0–1 | (Turkey) Fenerbahçe | Plzeň, Czech Republic |
| 20:00 EET | | Report | Ziegler (yellow card) 51'; Webó 81' | Stadium: Stadion města Plzně; Attendance: 11,701; Referee: Gianluca Rocchi (Italy) |

| 14 March 2013 Second leg | Fenerbahçe (Turkey) | 1–1 (2–1 agg.) | (Czech Republic) Viktoria Plzeň | Istanbul |
| 22:05 EET | Uçan 44'; Kuyt (yellow card) 64' | Report | Darida 61'; Bakoš (yellow card) 62'; Kolář (yellow card) 84'; Procházka (yellow card) 87' | Stadium: Şükrü Saracoğlu Stadium; Attendance: None; Referee: Manuel Gräfe (Germany) |

==== Quarter-finals ====
Win Draw Loss Postponed

| 4 April 2013 First leg | Fenerbahçe (Turkey) | 2–0 | (Italy) Lazio | Istanbul |
| 22:05 EET | Korkmaz (yellow card) 45+3'; Webó 78' (pen.), (yellow card) 79'; Kuyt 90+1'; Meireles (yellow card) 90+4' | Report | Onazi (yellow card) 31' (yellow-red card) 47'; Ederson (yellow card) 51'; Marchetti (yellow card) 54'; Radu (yellow card) 78'; Mauri (yellow card) 90' | Stadium: Şükrü Saracoğlu Stadium; Attendance: 43,629; Referee: Willie Collum (Scotland) |

| 11 April 2013 Second leg | Lazio (Italy) | 1–1 (1–3 agg.) | (Turkey) Fenerbahçe | Rome, Italy |
| 22:05 EET | Kozák (yellow card) 45'; Lulić 60', (yellow card) 64'; Klose (yellow card) 72' | | Ziegler (yellow card) 31'; Cristian (yellow card) 33'; Erkin (yellow card) 33', (goal) 73' | Stadium: Stadio Olimpico; Attendance: None; Referee: Pavel Královec (Czech Republic) |

==== Semi-finals ====
Win Draw Loss Postponed

| 25 April 2013 First leg | Fenerbahçe (Turkey) | 1–0 | (Portugal) Benfica | Istanbul |
| 22:05 EET | Cristian (yellow card) 38', (penalty missed) 45'; Topal (yellow card) 50'; Korkmaz 72'; Webó (yellow card) 90' | Report | Gomes (yellow card) 31'; Aimar (yellow card) 37'; Pereira (yellow card) 41'; John (yellow card) 45' | Stadium: Şükrü Saracoğlu Stadium; Attendance: 43,936; Referee: Milorad Mažić (Serbia) |

| 2 May 2013 Second leg | Benfica (Portugal) | 3–1 (3–2 agg.) | (Turkey) Fenerbahçe | Lisbon, Portugal |
| 22:05 EET | Gaitán 9'; Pereira (yellow card) 29'; Pérez (yellow card) 33'; Cardozo 35', 66' | Report | Kuyt 23' (pen.); Cristian (yellow card) 31'; Erkin (yellow card) 85' | Stadium: Estádio da Luz; Attendance: 55,402; Referee: Stéphane Laurent (France) |

== See also ==
- 2012 Süper Kupa
- 2012–13 Süper Lig
- 2012–13 Türkiye Kupası
- 2012–13 UEFA Champions League
- 2012–13 UEFA Europa League
