= 2013–14 Fenerbahçe S.K. season =

Fenerbahçe
2013–14 season
- President: Aziz Yıldırım
- Head coach: Ersun Yanal
- Stadium: Şükrü Saracoğlu Stadium
- Süper Lig: 1st
- Turkish Super Cup: Runners-up
- Turkish Cup: Fourth round
- UEFA Champions League: Play-off round
- Top goalscorer: League: Moussa Sow (15); All: Moussa Sow (16)
- Highest home attendance: 50,030 vs. Bursaspor (31 March 2014, Süper Lig)
- Lowest home attendance: 24,600 vs. Sivasspor (31 August 2013, Süper Lig)
- Average home league attendance: 34,811
Home colours	Away colours	Third colours

The 2013–14 season is Fenerbahçe's 56th consecutive season in the Süper Lig and their 107th year in existence. They also competed in the UEFA Champions League starting in the third qualifying round after being second in the 2012–13 domestic season. At the same time, Fenerbahçe was banned from European football, the Champions League third qualifying round spots shifted down after a match-fixing scandal. On 18 July 2013, Fenerbahçe's will enter the Champions League third qualifying round on Friday despite its UEFA ban for match-fixing scandal after winning an emergency ruling from the Court of Arbitration for Sport.

== Season overview ==
- On 22 May 2013, Alper Potuk completed a move to Fenerbahçe in 5-year contract. The transfer involved Henri Bienvenu moving in the opposite direction, to Eskişehirspor, while Fenerbahçe also paid €6.25 million.
- On 29 May 2013, Aykut Kocaman submits his resignation as Fenerbahçe coach, saying that he is ‘exhausted.’ The former goal-scoring great is set to leave the club only a week after leading the Istanbul club to a second successive Turkish Cup.
- On 6 June 2013, Fenerbahçe has come to an end on the negotiations with Zenit’s Bruno Alves. Our club has 3 years agreement with 32 years old Portuguese player, for a fee of €5.5 million.
- On 14 June 2013, Fenerbahçe has agreed on the terms of transfer of Czech left wing Michal Kadlec for 3 years, with €4.5 million transfer fee in 3 years contract.
- On 18 June 2013, Fenerbahçe has agreed on the terms with Swedish midfielder Samuel Holmén. The contract will be valid for 3 years.
- On 25 June 2013, UEFA announced on Wednesday that Turkish side Fenerbahçe has been banned from next two season's Champions League over match-fixing allegations. Fenerbahçe have been handed a two-year ban and will miss this season's Champions League, where they were due to enter in the third qualifying round. A third year has been suspended over a five-year probation period.
- On 28 June 2013, Ersun Yanal has agreed to take charge of Fenerbahçe, replacing Aykut Kocaman who resigned at the end of May, the club said on Friday. His appointment coincides with tough times for the Fenerbahçe who have been banned from European competition for two seasons over their involvement in a domestic match-fixing scandal. Fenerbahçe, who finished second in the Süper Lig last season, will miss out on next season's Champions League which they had been due to enter in the third qualifying round.
- On 1 July 2013, Fenerbahçe, open new season with training session. Yanal, addressing his players, said the absolute goal was winning the Süper Lig championship. “I have gotten to know you. You will get to know me and we will get to know each other much better. Let's keep our eyes on the prize and hope for the best next season,” he noted.
- On 11 July 2013, Fenerbahçe which applied to the Union of European Football Associations Appeals Body after it was banned from European club competitions by the UEFA disciplinary board last month, defended itself for seven hours during a hearing held in Nyon, Switzerland, on Wednesday.
- On 15 July 2013, Turkish clubs Fenerbahçe and Beşiktaş have failed in their bids to overturn bans from European competition, The Union of European Football Associations said on Monday. Fenerbahçe, who were due to compete in this season's Champions League, were banned from European soccer for two seasons and Beşiktaş, who had qualified for the Europa League, for one season.
- On 18 July 2013, Fenerbahçe said today the Court of Arbitration for Sport (CAS) had suspended the execution of UEFAs decision banning the club from European competition for two years over their involvement in a domestic match-fixing scandal. "Fenerbahçe soccer team will attend the UEFA Champions League draws on Friday and continue on its path," Fenerbahçe chairman Aziz Yıldırım told the club's official television channel.
- On 19 July 2013, Fenerbahçe has been pitted against Red Bull Salzburg in the UEFA Champions League Third qualifying round, after the top-level UEFA competition draw was made on July 19, a day after its match-fixing scandal ban was stayed.
- On 24 July 2013, Within the scope of pre-season camp, Fenerbahçe has competed to Dutch representative PSV at Şükrü Saracoğlu Stadium. Our team left the ground with 0–2 loss where our opponent’s goals came from Tim Matavž in the minute of 15 and Jürgen Locadia in 71st minute. Prior to the friendly, our Professional Football Team’s 2013–14 Jersey’s has been launched with a giant show.
- On 31 July 2013, The Ersun Yanal's first official match, Fenerbahçe made the most of their UEFA Champions League lifeline with a 1–1 draw against Red Bull Salzburg in the first leg of their Third qualifying round tie on Wednesday.
- On 6 August 2013, Fenerbahçe defeated Red Bull Salzburg in UEFA Champions League Third qualifying round with a 3–1 win. Also this match was the first official win the game for the new manager Ersun Yanal.
- On 7 August 2013, Emmanuel Emenike came back to Fenerbahçe for four-year deal after playing 2 seasons for Spartak Moscow. Fenerbahçe agreed to pay €13 million, while Emenike will get €2.4 million each season. On the same date Miroslav Stoch was loaned out to PAOK for €1 million.
- On 9 August 2013, Fenerbahçe have been drawn against Arsenal in the play-off round of the Champions League for a place in the elite 32-team group stages. The first leg was played on 21 August 2013 and the second on 28 August 2013.
- On 11 August 2013, Fenerbahçe and Galatasaray kicked off the new season of Turkish soccer in the Super Cup which was played in Kayseri. This was the 375th meeting between the two sides in history. Both sides played decent attacking soccer, but it was Galatasaray who had the last laugh with Didier Drogba heading home the only goal in the first half of Extra Time.
- On 18 August 2013, Ersun Yanal's first league match with Fenerbahçe, paid the price for its distraction as they squandered a 2–0 first half lead to eventually lose 3–2 to newcomer Torku Konyaspor in their Süper Lig opener at Konya Atatürk Stadium on Saturday evening.
- On 18 August 2013, Fenerbahçe will have a mountain to climb to reach the group stages of the Champions League after being crushed 3–0 by an efficient Arsenal at their caldron of Şükrü Saracoğlu Stadium in the first leg of the play-off round.
- On 27 August 2013, Fenerbahçe in desperate bid against rival Arsenal with lose 2–0 and 5–0 on aggregate, also on 28 August, they will be unable to compete in the UEFA Europa League this season after the Court of Arbitration for Sport upheld a UEFA-imposed two-year ban from European competition over a match-fixing scandal on Wednesday.
- On 3 November 2013, Aziz Yıldırım has been re-elected as Fenerbahçe chairman for a record 11th term, which ensures that he will become the longest-serving figure heading one of Turkey's biggest and most popular clubs.
- On 27 April 2014, Yanal's team Fenerbahçe won the Süper Lig title with three games to spare on Sunday after a 0–0 draw at home to Çaykur Rizespor, in front of a crowd made up exclusively of women and children.

== Kits ==
- Supplier: Adidas
- Main sponsor: Türk Telekom
- Back sponsor: Ülker
- Sleeve sponsor: Avea
- Short sponsor: MNG Kargo
- Socks sponsor: –

Home
Home Alt.
Home Alt. 2º
Home Alt. 3º
Away
Away Alt.
Third

== Transfers ==
Football Transfers Summer 2013
Players transferred in
Date	Pos.	Name	Club	Fee	Ref.
22 May 2013	MF	Alper Potuk	Eskişehirspor	€6,250,000	
6 June 2013	DF	Bruno Alves	Zenit St. Petersburg	€5,500,000	
14 June 2013	DF	Michal Kadlec	Bayer Leverkusen	€4,500,000	
18 June 2013	MF	Samuel Holmén	İstanbul BB	Free	
10 August 2013	FW	Emmanuel Emenike	Spartak Moscow	€13,000,000	
Players transferred out
Date	Pos.	Name	Club	Fee	Ref.
4 June 2013	FW	Henri Bienvenu	Eskişehirspor	Undisclosed	
2 July 2013	DF	Orhan Şam	Kasımpaşa	Undisclosed	
8 July 2013	MF	Sezer Öztürk	Beşiktaş	€1,500,000	
5 September 2013	GK	Serkan Kırıntılı	Çaykur Rizespor	Undisclosed	
Players loan out
Date	Pos.	Name	Club	Fee	Ref.
7 August 2013	MF	Miroslav Stoch	PAOK	€1,000,000	
30 August 2013	MF	Miloš Krasić	Bastia	€800,000	
Players released
Date	Pos.	Name	Subsequent club	Join date	Ref.
19 June 2013	FW	Semih Şentürk	Antalyaspor		

Total spending: ▼€29,250,000
Total income: ▲€3,300,000

== Line-up ==
As of 25 May 2014

No.	Pos.	Name	GS	Note
1	GK	Volkan Demirel	33	(Note: Mert Günok has 7 starts)
77	RB	Gökhan Gönül	29	(Note: Mehmet Topuz has 10 starts, Bekir İrtegün has 1 start)
2	CD	Egemen Korkmaz	22	(Note: Bekir İrtegün has 11 starts, Joseph Yobo has 5 starts, Michal Kadlec has 2 starts)
15	CD	Bruno Alves	29	(Note: Bekir İrtegün has 7 starts, Michal Kadlec has 3 starts, Serdar Kesimal has 1 start)
88	LB	Caner Erkin	30	(Note: Michal Kadlec has 7 starts, Hasan Ali Kaldırım has 3 starts)
5	CM	Mehmet Topal	29	(Note: Selçuk Şahin has 10 starts, Emre Belözoğlu has 2 starts)
14	CM	Raul Meireles	21	(Note: Alper Potuk has 14 starts, Cristian Baroni has 4 starts, Emre Belözoğlu has 1 start)
25	CM	Emre Belözoğlu	15	(Note: Cristian Baroni has 14 starts, Samuel Holmén has 5 starts, Alper Potuk has 3 starts, Salih Uçan has 3 starts)
12	RW	Dirk Kuyt	34	(Note: Samuel Holmén has 2 starts, Emmanuel Emenike has 2 starts, Alper Potuk has 2 starts)
7	LW	Moussa Sow	32	(Note: Mehmet Topuz has 2 starts, Dirk Kuyt has 2 starts, Emmanuel Emenike has 2 starts, Hasan Ali Kaldırım has 1 start, Caner Erkin has 1 start)
9	CF	Emmanuel Emenike	20	(Note: Pierre Webó has 18 starts, Moussa Sow has 1 start, Dirk Kuyt has 1 start)

== Squad ==
=== First team squad ===
No.	Name	Nationality	Position(s)	Date of birth (age)	Signed from	Since
Goalkeepers
1	Volkan Demirel	(Turkey)	GK	27 October 1981 (aged 32)	Kartalspor	2002
23	Mert Günok	(Turkey)	GK	1 March 1989 (aged 25)	Youth system	2009
Defenders
2	Egemen Korkmaz	(Turkey)	DF	3 November 1982 (aged 31)	Beşiktaş	2012
3	Hasan Ali Kaldırım	(Turkey)	DF	9 December 1989 (aged 24)	Kayserispor	2012
4	Bekir İrtegün	(Turkey)	DF	20 April 1984 (aged 30)	Gaziantepspor	2009
22	Bruno Alves	(Portugal)	DF	16 November 1981 (aged 32)	Zenit	2013
24	Michal Kadlec	(Czech Republic)	DF	13 December 1984 (aged 29)	Bayer Leverkusen	2013
53	Serdar Kesimal	(Turkey)	DF	24 January 1989 (aged 25)	Kayserispor	2011
77	Gökhan Gönül	(Turkey)	DF	5 January 1985 (aged 29)	Hacettepe	2007
Midfielders
5	Mehmet Topal	(Turkey)	MF	3 March 1986 (aged 28)	Valencia	2012
8	Samuel Holmén	(Sweden)	MF	28 June 1984 (aged 29)	İstanbul Başakşehir	2013
14	Raul Meireles	(Portugal)	MF	17 March 1983 (aged 31)	Chelsea	2012
16	Cristian Baroni	(Brazil)	MF	25 June 1983 (aged 30)	Corinthians	2009
21	Selçuk Şahin	(Turkey)	MF	31 January 1981 (aged 33)	Istanbulspor	2003
25	Emre Belözoğlu	(Turkey)	MF	7 September 1980 (aged 33)	Atlético Madrid	2013
26	Alper Potuk	(Turkey)	MF	8 April 1991 (aged 23)	Eskişehirspor	2013
38	Mehmet Topuz	(Turkey)	MF	7 September 1983 (aged 30)	Kayserispor	2009
48	Salih Uçan	(Turkey)	MF	6 January 1994 (aged 20)	Bucaspor	2012
88	Caner Erkin	(Turkey)	MF	4 October 1988 (aged 25)	CSKA Moscow	2010
Forwards
7	Moussa Sow	(Senegal)	FW	19 January 1986 (aged 28)	Lille	2012
9	Pierre Webó	(Cameroon)	FW	20 January 1982 (aged 32)	İstanbul Başakşehir	2013
11	Dirk Kuyt	(Netherlands)	FW	22 June 1980 (aged 33)	Liverpool	2012
29	Emmanuel Emenike	(Nigeria)	FW	10 May 1987 (aged 27)	Spartak Moscow	2013

=== Reserve squad ===
As of 1 August 2013

Note: Flags indicate national team as defined under FIFA eligibility rules; some limited exceptions apply. Players may hold more than one non-FIFA nationality.

No.	Pos.	Nation	Player
—	GK	TUR	Murat Hocaoğlu
—	GK	TUR	Erten Ersu
—	DF	TUR	Egemen Zengin
—	DF	TUR	Metincan Cici

No.	Pos.	Nation	Player
—	MF	TUR	Muhammed Akarslan
—	MF	TUR	Ramazan Civelek
—	FW	TUR	Aziz Ceylan

Source: Fenerbahçe S.K.

== Squad statistics ==
No.	Nat.	Player	Süper Lig				Türkiye Kupası (Note: Includes 2013 Turkish Super Cup)				Champions League				Total			
No.	Nat.	Player	Apps	Goal	Yellow card	Red card	Apps	Goal	Yellow card	Red card	Apps	Goal	Yellow card	Red card	Apps	Goal	Yellow card	Red card
1	(Turkey)	Volkan Demirel	29	0	1	0	0	0	0	0	4	0	0	0	33	0	1	0
2	(Turkey)	Egemen Korkmaz	20	2	4	1	0	0	0	0	1	0	1	0	21	2	5	1
3	(Turkey)	Hasan Ali Kaldırım	4	0	0	0	2	0	0	0	0	0	0	0	6	0	0	0
4	(Turkey)	Bekir İrtegün	19	1	3	0	2	0	0	0	1	0	0	0	22	1	4	0
5	(Turkey)	Mehmet Topal	26	3	3	0	1	0	0	0	3	0	0	0	30	3	3	0
6	(Nigeria)	Joseph Yobo	1	1	0	0	1	0	0	0	3	0	0	0	5	0	0	1
7	(Senegal)	Moussa Sow	30	15	2	0	1	0	0	0	4	1	0	0	35	16	2	0
8	(Sweden)	Samuel Holmén	6	0	1	0	1	0	0	0	0	0	0	0	7	0	1	0
9	(Cameroon)	Pierre Webó	26	9	2	0	2	0	1	0	4	1	1	0	31	10	4	0
11	(Netherlands)	Dirk Kuyt	32	10	3	0	1	0	0	0	4	0	0	0	37	10	3	0
14	(Portugal)	Raul Meireles	20	1	2	1	0	0	0	0	4	1	1	0	24	2	3	1
16	(Brazil)	Cristian Baroni	17	4	2	1	2	0	0	0	3	1	0	0	22	5	2	1
21	(Turkey)	Selçuk Şahin	17	0	2	0	1	0	0	0	3	0	0	0	21	0	2	0
22	(Portugal)	Bruno Alves	25	2	6	0	1	0	2	1	4	0	1	0	30	2	9	1
23	(Turkey)	Mert Günok	5	0	0	0	2	0	0	0	0	0	0	0	7	0	0	0
24	(Czech Republic)	Michal Kadlec	9	2	0	0	2	0	0	0	3	0	1	0	14	2	1	0
25	(Turkey)	Emre Belözoğlu	20	6	7	1	1	0	0	0	2	0	1	0	23	6	8	1
26	(Turkey)	Alper Potuk	28	1	6	0	2	0	0	0	4	0	1	0	34	1	6	0
29	(Nigeria)	Emmanuel Emenike	28	12	5	0	1	0	0	0	2	0	1	0	31	12	6	0
38	(Turkey)	Mehmet Topuz	24	0	1	0	2	0	1	0	3	0	0	0	29	0	2	0
48	(Turkey)	Salih Uçan	16	0	1	0	1	0	0	0	0	0	0	0	17	0	1	0
53	(Turkey)	Serdar Kesimal	1	0	0	0	0	0	0	0	0	0	0	0	1	0	0	0
77	(Turkey)	Gökhan Gönül	29	0	4	0	0	0	0	0	2	0	1	0	31	0	5	0
88	(Turkey)	Caner Erkin	30	3	12	0	1	0	0	0	2	0	1	0	33	3	13	0
As of 16 May 2014

== Statistics ==
As of 16 May 2014

=== Goals ===
Pl.	Nat.	Player	Süper Lig	Türkiye Kupası	Champions League	TOTAL
1	(Senegal)	Moussa Sow	15	0	1	16
2	(Nigeria)	Emmanuel Emenike	12	0	0	12
3	(Netherlands)	Dirk Kuyt	10	0	0	10
3	(Cameroon)	Pierre Webó	9	0	1	10
4	(Turkey)	Emre Belözoğlu	6	0	0	6
5	(Brazil)	Cristian Baroni	4	0	1	5
6	(Turkey)	Caner Erkin	3	0	0	3
6	(Turkey)	Mehmet Topal	3	0	0	3
7	(Turkey)	Egemen Korkmaz	2	0	0	2
7	(Portugal)	Bruno Alves	2	0	0	2
7	(Czech Republic)	Michal Kadlec	2	0	0	2
7	(Portugal)	Raul Meireles	1	0	1	2
8	(Turkey)	Bekir İrtegün	1	0	0	1
8	(Turkey)	Alper Potuk	1	0	0	1
8	(Nigeria)	Joseph Yobo	1	0	0	1
Own goals			0	1	0	1

=== Assists ===
Pl.	Nat.	Player	Süper Lig	Türkiye Kupası	Champions League	TOTAL
1	(Turkey)	Caner Erkin	10	0	0	10
2	(Netherlands)	Dirk Kuyt	6	0	2	8
3	(Nigeria)	Emmanuel Emenike	6	0	0	6
3	(Senegal)	Moussa Sow	5	0	1	6
4	(Brazil)	Cristian Baroni	5	0	0	5
5	(Turkey)	Alper Potuk	4	0	0	4
6	(Turkey)	Gökhan Gönül	3	0	0	3
7	(Portugal)	Raul Meireles	2	0	0	2
7	(Turkey)	Mehmet Topuz	2	0	0	2
7	(Cameroon)	Pierre Webó	2	0	0	2
8	(Czech Republic)	Michal Kadlec	1	0	0	1
8	(Turkey)	Emre Belözoğlu	1	0	0	1
8	(Turkey)	Salih Uçan	1	0	0	1

== Club hierarchy ==
=== Board of directors ===
President	Aziz Yıldırım
Deputy President	Abdullah Kiğılı
Chief executive officer	Hakkı Hasan Yılmaz
Investment and Projects	Nihat Özbağı
Financial and Administrative Restructuring	Ender Alkaya
Social Affairs and The Associations	Mithat Yenigün
The Stadium and Facilities	Ömer Temelli
Departments except Football	İlhan Ekşioğlu
Accountant Member	Tahir Perek
Advertising/Marketing/Fundraising	İsfendiyar Zülfikari
General Secretary	Talat Yılmaz
Legal Affairs	Şekip Mosturoğlu
Legal Affairs	Tolga Aytöre
Football teams except the senior	Ersan Topbaş

Source: Fenerbahce.org

=== Management ===
Manager	Ersun Yanal
Administrative Manager	Hasan Çetinkaya
Assistant Coach	İsmail Kartal
Assistant Coach	Volkan Kazak
Assistant Coach	Recep Karatepe
Goalkeeper Coach	Murat Öztürk
Doctor	Burak Kunduracıoğlu
Physiotherapist	Erdem Yörükoğlu
Physiotherapist	Umut Şahin
Physiotherapist	Ata Özgür Ercan

Source: Fenerbahce.org

== Overall ==
Trophy	Started round	First match	Last match	Result
Süper Lig	—	18 August 2013	18 May 2014	Champions
Türkiye Kupası	Fourth Round	4 December 2013	4 December 2013	Fourth Round
Süper Kupa	Final	11 August 2013	-	Runners–up
Champions League	Third qualifying round	31 July 2013	28 August 2013	Play-off round

== Pre-season friendlies ==
Date	Opponents	H / A	Result F–A	Notes
19 July 2013	(Turkey) Boluspor	A	4–0	
21 July 2013	(Azerbaijan) Khazar Lankaran	A	4–0	
24 July 2013	(Netherlands) PSV	H	0–2	
12 January 2014	(Turkey) Alanyaspor	A	1–2	
16 January 2014	(Germany) Hannover 96	A	2–1	
18 January 2014	(Azerbaijan) Neftchi Baku	A	0–0	

Win Draw Loss Postponed

== Turkish Super Cup ==
- On 11 August 2013, Fenerbahçe and Galatasaray kicked off the new season of Turkish soccer in the Super Cup which was played in Kayseri. This was the 375th meeting between the two sides in history. Both sides played decent attacking soccer, but it was Galatasaray who had the last laugh with Didier Drogba heading home the only goal in the first half of Extra Time.

Date	Opponents	H / A	Result	Notes
11 August 2013	Galatasaray	N	0–1 (aet)	

== Süper Lig ==
=== League table ===
Pos	Team	Pld	W	D	L	GF	GA	GD	Pts	Qualification or relegation
1	Fenerbahçe (C)	34	23	5	6	74	33	+41	74	(Note: Although Fenerbahçe would have qualified for the Champions League group stage as champions, they were barred from participating in next season's European competitions due to UEFA sanctioning because of the 2011 Turkish football match-fixing scandal, with this season also counting for that ban. As a result, the runners-up of the league (Galatasaray) entered the Champions League group stage instead of the third qualifying round, the third-placed team of the league (Beşiktaş) entered the Champions League third qualifying round instead of the Europa League play-off round, and the fourth-placed team of the league (Trabzonspor) entered the Europa League play-off round instead of the third qualifying round.)
2	Galatasaray	34	18	11	5	59	32	+27	65	Qualification for the Champions League group stage
3	Beşiktaş	34	17	11	6	53	33	+20	62	Qualification for the Champions League third qualifying round
4	Trabzonspor	34	14	11	9	53	41	+12	53 (Note: Trabzonspor finished ahead of Sivasspor on head-to-head record: Trabzonspor–Sivasspor 0–0, Sivasspor–Trabzonspor 0–4.)	Qualification for the Europa League play-off round
5	Sivasspor	34	16	5	13	60	55	+5	53	(Note: Sivasspor were banned from European competitions by UEFA due to match-fixing. As a result, their Europa League spot was passed down the league to the next eligible team (Karabükspor).)

Source: tff.org
Rules for classification: 1) points; 2) goal difference; 3) number of goals scored.
(C) Champions

=== Results summary ===
Overall								Home						Away					
Pld	W	D	L	GF	GA	GD	Pts	W	D	L	GF	GA	GD	W	D	L	GF	GA	GD
34	23	5	6	74	33	+41	74	14	3	0	46	11	+35	9	2	6	28	22	+6

=== Results by round ===
Round	1	2	3	4	5	6	7	8	9	10	11	12	13	14	15	16	17	18	19	20	21	22	23	24	25	26	27	28	29	30	31	32	33	34
Ground	A	H	H	A	H	A	H	A	H	A	H	A	H	A	H	A	H	H	A	A	H	A	H	A	H	A	H	A	H	A	H	A	H	A
Result	L	W	W	W	W	W	D	W	W	W	W	W	D	W	W	L	W	W	L	L	W	D	W	W	W	W	W	L	W	D	D	L	W	W
Position	11	7	3	2	1	1	1	1	1	1	1	1	1	1	1	1	1	1	1	1	1	1	1	1	1	1	1	1	1	1	1	1	1	1

A = Away; H = Home; W = Win; D = Draw; L = Loss

=== Matches ===
#	Date	Opponents	H / A	Result F–A	Scorers	Notes
1	17 August 2013	Konyaspor	A	2–3	Yobo 16', Belözoğlu 27' (pen.)	
2	24 August 2013	Eskişehirspor	H	1–0	Kuyt 53'	
3	31 August 2013	Sivasspor	H	5–2	Kuyt (2) 15', 35', Alves 32', Webó 49', Potuk 89'	
4	16 September 2013	Kasımpaşa	A	3–2	Erkin 31', Webó (2) 74', 90+2'	
5	21 September 2013	Elazığspor	H	4–0	Sow (3) 10', 80', 90' Kuyt 21'	
6	29 September 2013	Gençlerbirliği	A	1–0	Kuyt 60'	
7	6 October 2013	Trabzonspor	H	0–0	–	
8	20 October 2013	Kayseri Erciyesspor	A	2–1	Sow 9', Emenike 90+4'	
9	25 October 2013	Gaziantepspor	H	3–1	Emenike (2) 14', 86' Sow 39'	
10	3 November 2013	Bursaspor	A	3–2	Webó 63', Emenike 83', Korkmaz 90+4'	
11	10 November 2013	Galatasaray	H	2–0	Belözoğlu 23' (pen.), Cristian 66'	
12	24 November 2013	Antalyaspor	A	2–1	Webó 5', Sow 90+1'	
13	30 November 2013	Beşiktaş	H	3–3	Emenike 12', Sow 37', Kuyt 83'	
14	7 December 2013	Çaykur Rizespor	A	2–1	Cristian 45', Webó 83'	
15	13 December 2013	Akhisar Belediyespor	H	4–0	Emenike 43', Sow 53', Webó 58', Kuyt 68'	
16	22 December 2013	Kardemir Karabükspor	A	1–2	Emenike 40'	
17	29 December 2013	Kayserispor	H	5–1	Cristian 52' (pen.), Sow 61', Topal 63', Emenike 70', Erkin 76'	
18	27 January 2014	Konyaspor	H	2–1	Alves 44', Korkmaz 80'	
19	1 February 2014	Eskişehirspor	A	1–2	Kuyt 42'	
20	9 February 2014	Sivasspor	A	0–2	–	
21	16 February 2014	Kasımpaşa	H	2–1	Belözoğlu 64', İrtegün 81'	
22	24 February 2014	Elazığspor	A	1–1	Topal 83'	
23	1 March 2014	Gençlerbirliği	H	2–0	Belözoğlu (2) 57' (pen.) 71' (pen.),	
24	10 March 2014	Trabzonspor	A	3–0	(Note: "Referee halted match at half-time and abandoned after crowd trouble") (Note: The Turkish Football Federation disciplinary committee have awarded Fenerbahçe a 3–0 victory for the abandoned match against Trabzonspor on 10 March 2014.)	
25	16 March 2014	Kayseri Erciyesspor	H	2–1	Kuyt 33', Emenike 64'	
26	24 March 2014	Gaziantepspor	A	3–0	Emenike (2) 10' 34', Sow 76'	
27	30 March 2014	Bursaspor	H	3–0	Kuyt 17', Sow 75', Webó 86'	
28	6 April 2014	Galatasaray	A	0–1	–	
29	13 April 2014	Antalyaspor	H	4–1	Erkin 21', Kadlec (2) 38' 89', Sow 90+4'	
30	20 April 2014	Beşiktaş	A	1–1	Sow 24'	
31	27 April 2014	Çaykur Rizespor	H	0–0	–	
32	4 May 2014	Akhisar Belediyespor	A	1–3	Topal 53'	
33	11 May 2014	Kardemir Karabükspor	H	4–0	Sow 14', Meireles 41', Belözoğlu 43', Webó 90'	
34	18 May 2014	Kayserispor	A	2–0	Cristian 13', Sow 90+3'	

Win Draw Loss Postponed

== Turkish Cup ==
- On 4 December 2013, Fenerbahçe suffered an unexpected 2–1 reverse in their Turkish Cup game at their home Şükrü Saracoğlu Stadium against first division minnows of Fethiyespor with the result, the double title-holders fall as they had entered the competition in the fourth round stage.

Round	Date	Opponents	H / A	Result	Scorers	Notes
4th	4 December 2013	Fethiyespor	H	1–2	Sabri 45' (o.g.)	

== UEFA Champions League ==
- On 31 July 2013, The Ersun Yanal's first official match, Fenerbahçe made the most of their UEFA Champions League lifeline with a 1–1 draw against Red Bull Salzburg in the first leg of their Third qualifying round tie on Wednesday. On 6 August 2013, Fenerbahçe defeated Red Bull Salzburg in UEFA Champions League Third qualifying round with a 3–1 win. Also this match was the first official win the game for the new manager Ersun Yanal. On 9 August 2013, Fenerbahçe have been drawn against Arsenal in the play-off round of the Champions League for a place in the elite 32-team group stages. The first leg was played on 21 August 2013 and the second on 28 August 2013. On 18 August 2013, Fenerbahçe will have a mountain to climb to reach the group stages of the Champions League after being crushed 3–0 by an efficient Arsenal at their caldron of Şükrü Saracoğlu Stadium in the first leg of the play-off round. On 27 August 2013, Fenerbahçe in desperate bid against rival Arsenal with lose 2–0 and 5–0 on aggregate, also on 28 August, they will be unable to compete in the UEFA Europa League this season after the Court of Arbitration for Sport upheld a UEFA-imposed two-year ban from European competition over a match-fixing scandal on Wednesday.

=== Third qualifying round ===
Date	Round	Opponents	H / A	Result	Scorers	Notes
31 July 2013	First leg	(Austria) Red Bull Salzburg	A	1–1	Cristian 90+5' (pen.)	
6 August 2013	Second leg	(Austria) Red Bull Salzburg	H	3–1	Meireles 8', Sow 17', Webó 34'	

Fenerbahçe won 4–2 on aggregate.

=== Play-off round ===
Date	Round	Opponents	H / A	Result	Notes
21 August 2013	First leg	(England) Arsenal	H	0–3	
28 August 2013	Second leg	(England) Arsenal	A	0–2	

Fenerbahçe lose 0–5 on aggregate.

== See also ==
- 2013 Süper Kupa
- 2013–14 Süper Lig
- 2013–14 Türkiye Kupası
- 2013–14 UEFA Champions League
