= Ömer Can Sokullu =

Turkish footballer

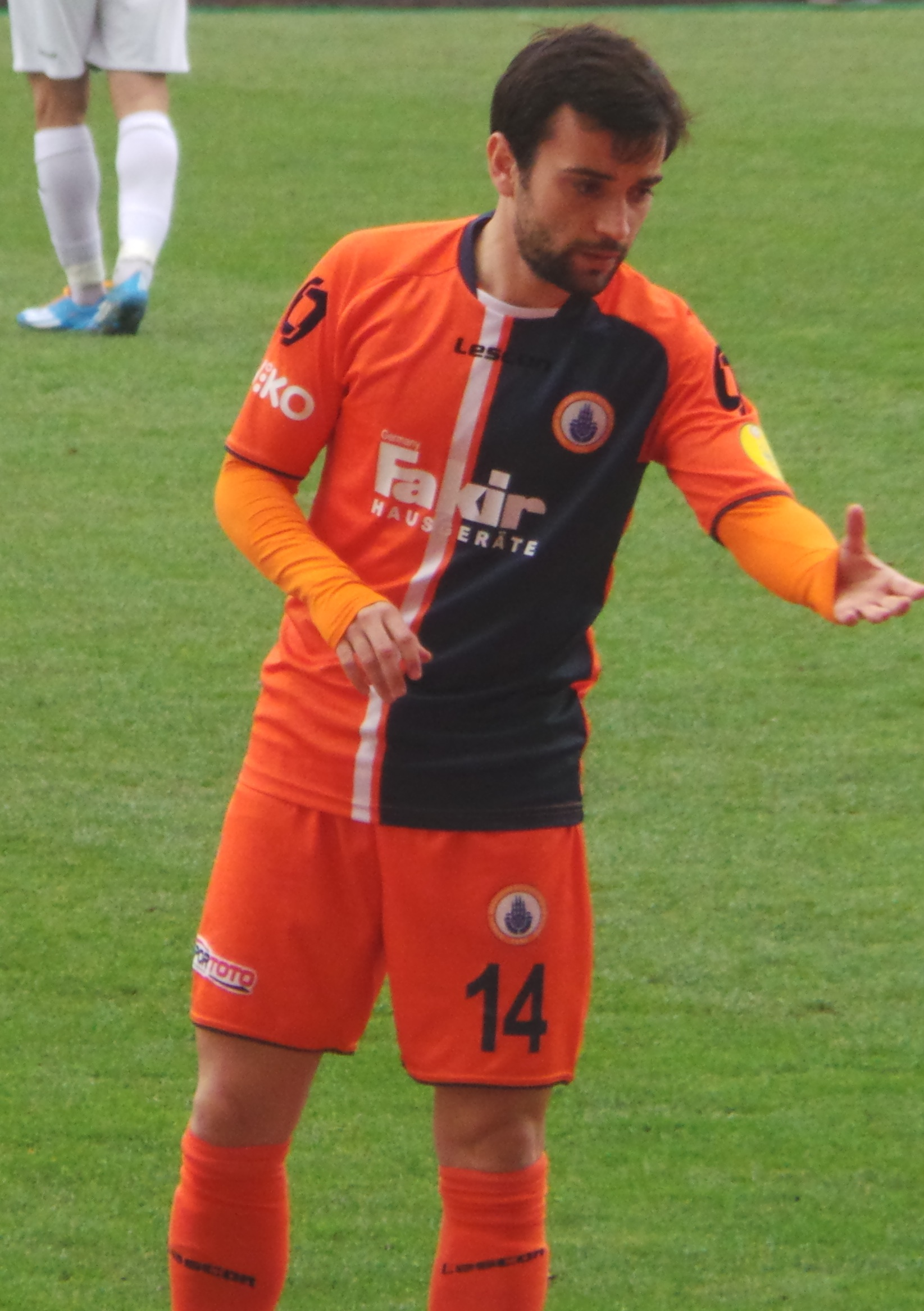

Personal information
- Date of birth: 14 August 1988 (age 38)
- Place of birth: Bolu, Turkey
- Height: 1.75 m (5 ft 9 in)
- Positions: Winger; midfielder

Team information
- Current team: Ergene Velimeşe
- Number: 23

Youth career
- 1998–2003: Balkan Yeşilbağlarspor
- 2003–2006: Pendikspor

Senior career*
Years	Team	Apps	(Gls)
2006–2011	Pendikspor	155	(43)
2011–2016	İstanbul Başakşehir	67	(8)
2015–2016	→ Karşıyaka (loan)	28	(3)
2016–2017	Ümraniyespor	28	(2)
2017–2018	Kastamonuspor 1966	20	(1)
2018–2021	Pendikspor	79	(19)
2021–2022	Sakaryaspor	24	(0)
2022–2023	Kırklarelispor	14	(0)
2023–	Ergene Velimeşe	10	(0)

International career
2005	Turkey U17	1	(0)
2006–2007	Turkey U19	7	(0)
- * Club domestic league appearances and goals as of 17 September 2023

Ömer Can Sokullu (born 14 August 1988) is a Turkish footballer who plays as a midfielder for Ergene Velimeşe.
