= Ergene Velimeşe S.K. =

Turkish football club

Ergene Velimeşe
- Full name: Ergene Velimeşe Spor Kulübü
- Founded: 2014
- Ground: Mustafa Kemal Atatürk Stadium, Ergene
- Capacity: 1,685
- Chairman: Mehmet Us
- Manager: Okay Yaman
- League: TFF Third League Group II
- 2023–24: 11th of 15
- Website: http://www.ergenevelimesespor.com/
Home colours	Away colours

Ergene Velimeşe Spor Kulübü is a Turkish football club located in Ergene, Tekirdağ in Turkey.

== History ==
The club spent most of its history as an amateur club under the name Velimeşe Belediyespor, moving to the Turkish Regional Amateur League in 2014. The club changed their name to Ergene Velimeşe Spor Kulübü in 2016 and subsequently won the Turkish Regional Amateur League to get promoted into TFF Third League for the first time. On 23 May 2019, they beat Nevşehir Belediyespor in a playoff and were promoted into the TFF Second League for the 2019–20 season, also for the first time in their history.

== Colours and badge ==
The club colours are blue and sky blue.

== Current squad ==
As of 14 January 2022

Note: Flags indicate national team as defined under FIFA eligibility rules; some limited exceptions apply. Players may hold more than one non-FIFA nationality.

No.	Pos.	Nation	Player
—	GK	TUR	Emre Yılmaz
—	GK	TUR	Kaan Atakan
—	DF	TUR	Yusuf Tantan
—	DF	TUR	Bilal Yıldırım
—	DF	TUR	Furkan Külekçi
—	DF	TUR	Emrah Taysı
—	DF	TUR	Göksu Alhas
—	DF	TUR	Muhammet Mahmut Emir
—	DF	TUR	Oğuzhan Yazıcı
—	DF	TUR	Savaş Polat
—	DF	TUR	Burak Can Alakuş
—	DF	TUR	Emirhan Kahraman
—	MF	TUR	Zeki Korkmaz

No.	Pos.	Nation	Player
—	MF	TUR	Emre Yıldız
—	MF	TUR	Doğukan Efe
—	MF	TUR	Gökay Iravul
—	MF	GER	İbrahim Fatih Dilek
—	MF	TUR	Eser Akbaş
—	MF	TUR	Burhan Arman
—	MF	TUR	Emre Can Atila
—	MF	TUR	Ömer Salihoğlu
—	FW	TUR	Utkan Konyalı
—	FW	TUR	Oğuzhan Akgün
—	FW	TUR	Feyzullah Şahin Güneş
—	FW	TUR	Yakup Alkan

== Honours ==
- Turkish Regional Amateur League: 2016-17
