= Zeki Korkmaz =

Turkish footballer

Personal information
- Date of birth: 1 September 1988 (age 38)
- Place of birth: Bingöl, Turkey
- Height: 1.75 m (5 ft 9 in)
- Position: Central midfielder

Team information
- Current team: Elazığspor
- Number: 24

Youth career
- 1999–2006: Pendikspor

Senior career*
Years	Team	Apps	(Gls)
2006–2008	Pendikspor	48	(5)
2008–2015	Istanbul BB	95	(1)
2015	Elazığspor	15	(0)
2015–2016	Karşıyaka	26	(0)
2017	Pendikspor	27	(1)
2018	Payasspor	11	(2)
2018	Darıca Gençlerbirliği	12	(1)
2019	Kahramanmaraşspor	7	(0)
2019	Sakaryaspor	2	(0)
2020	BAKspor	9	(2)
2020–2021	Amed	24	(0)
2021–2022	Ergene Velimeşe	10	(0)
2022–2023	Elazığspor	38	(1)
2023-2024	12 Bingölspor	8	(0)

International career
2007	Turkey U19	2	(0)
2008	Turkey U20	1	(0)
2009–2010	Turkey U21	2	(0)
- * Club domestic league appearances and goals as of 7 June 2024

Zeki Korkmaz (born 1 September 1988) is a Turkish footballer who plays as a midfielder for Elazığspor.
