= Murat Kayalı =

Turkish footballer

Personal information
- Date of birth: 13 August 1989 (age 37)
- Place of birth: Denizli, Turkey
- Height: 1.73 m (5 ft 8 in)
- Positions: Central midfielder; left wing

Team information
- Current team: 23 Elazığ FK
- Number: 23

Senior career*
Years	Team	Apps	(Gls)
2006–2010	Diyarbakırspor	0	(0)
2008	→ Batman Petrolspor (loan)	14	(2)
2008–2009	→ Siirtspor (loan)	24	(1)
2009–2010	→ Elazığspor (loan)	27	(3)
2010–2013	Elazığspor	101	(5)
2013–2014	→ Şanlıurfaspor (loan)	29	(5)
2014	Gaziantep BB	16	(1)
2014–2017	Elazığspor	70	(2)
2018–2020	Gümüşhanespor	63	(5)
2020–2021	Esenler Erokspor	28	(3)
2021–2022	Bergama Belediyespor	17	(4)
2022–2023	Kahramanmaraşspor	16	(1)
2023	Nevşehir Belediyespor	8	(1)
2023–	23 Elazığ FK	3	(0)

International career
2007	Turkey U19	2	(0)
2012–	Turkey A2	1	(0)
- * Club domestic league appearances and goals as of 1 October 2023

Murat Kayalı (born 13 August 1989) is a Turkish footballer who plays as a midfielder for TFF Third League club 23 Elazığ FK. He made his Süper Lig debut on 18 August 2012.
