= Beykan Şimşek =

Turkish footballer

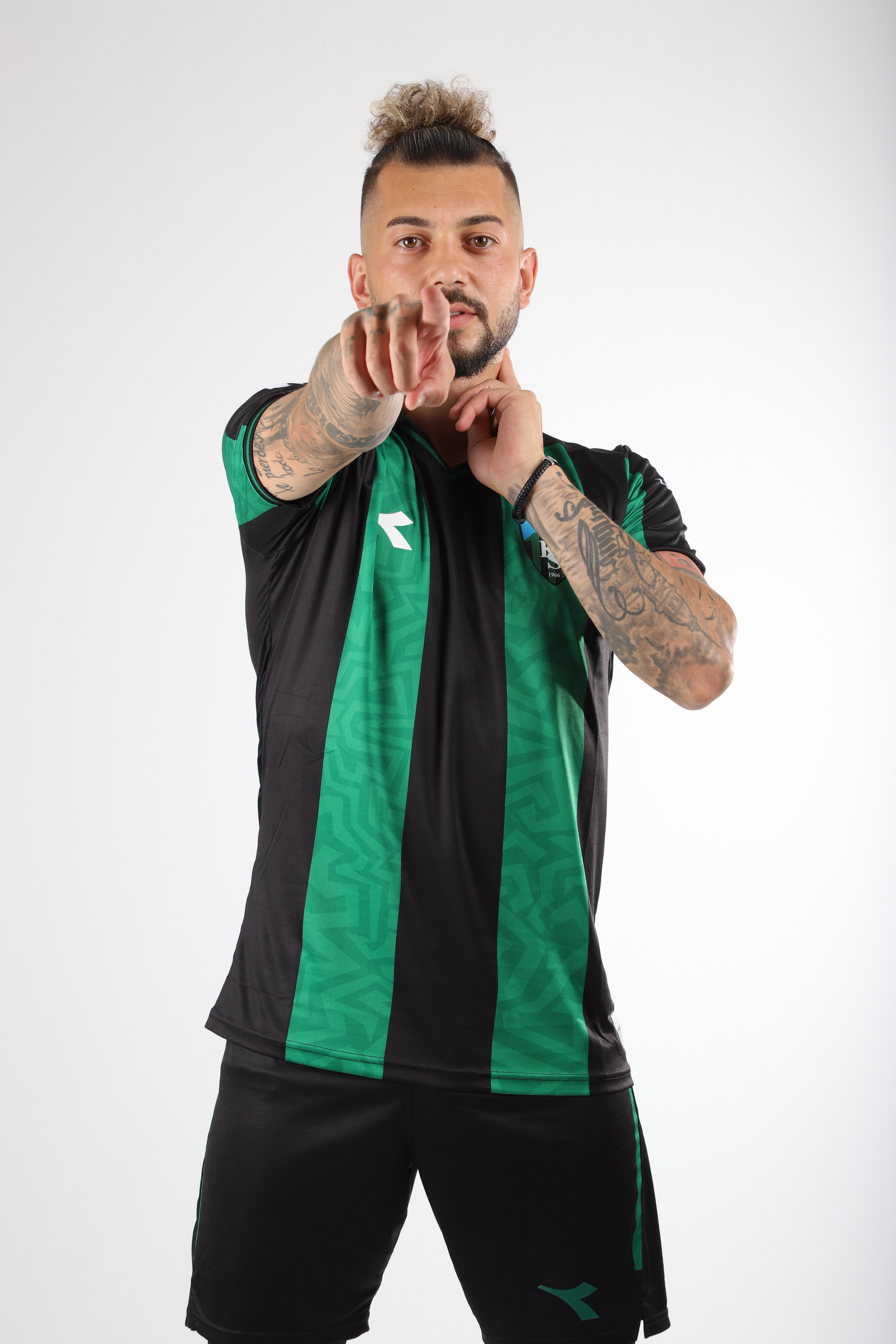

Personal information
- Date of birth: 7 November 1994 (age 32)
- Place of birth: Aydın, Turkey
- Height: 1.78 m (5 ft 10 in)
- Positions: Winger; forward

Team information
- Current team: Elazığspor
- Number: 80

Youth career
- 2006–2007: Isparta Genclerbirligispor
- 2007–2013: Fenerbahçe

Senior career*
Years	Team	Apps	(Gls)
2013–2018	Fenerbahçe	1	(0)
2013–2014	→ Karabükspor (loan)	10	(1)
2014–2015	→ Adana Demirspor (loan)	23	(7)
2015–2017	→ Sivasspor (loan)	38	(5)
2017	→ Altınordu (loan)	5	(1)
2017–2018	→ Sakaryaspor (loan)	31	(13)
2018–2021	Ankaraspor	68	(14)
2021–2022	Göztepe	12	(2)
2022	→ Bandırmaspor (loan)	11	(1)
2022–2023	Kocaelispor	29	(8)
2023–	Elazığspor	3	(0)

International career
2009–2010	Turkey U-15	5	(2)
2010–2011	Turkey U-16	8	(3)
2011–2012	Turkey U-17	12	(6)
2012	Turkey U-18	4	(0)
2012–2013	Turkey U-19	2	(0)
2013	Turkey U-20	3	(0)
2013	Turkey B	3	(0)
- * Club domestic league appearances and goals as of 23 September 2023

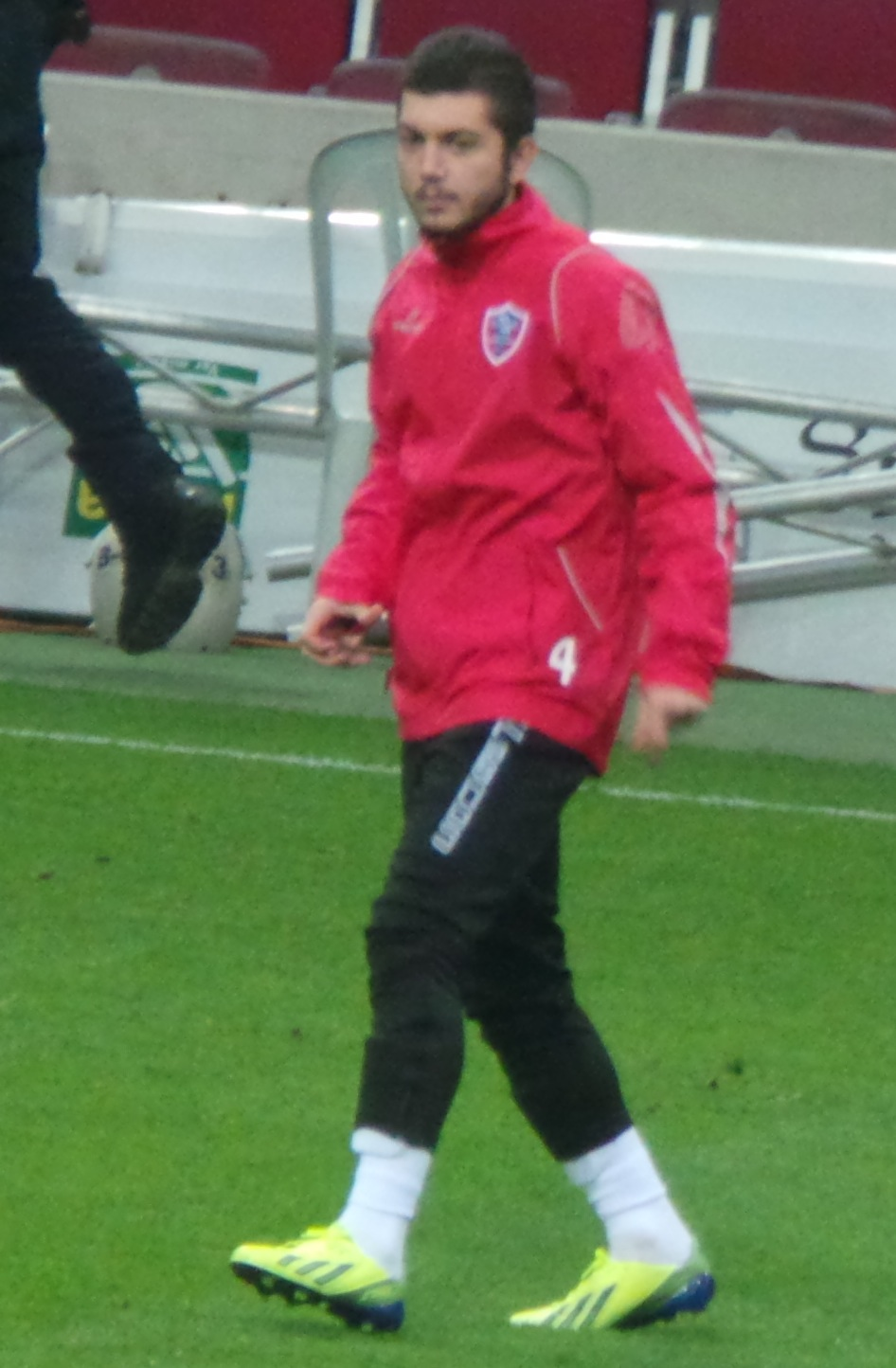
Şimşek in 2013

Beykan Şimşek (born 7 November 1994) is a Turkish footballer who plays for Elazığspor.

== Career ==
Beykan made his debut with Fenerbahçe in the Turkish Cup on 23 January 2013 against Bursaspor. He replaced Miroslav Stoch after 73 minutes. He scored the third goal in the 86th minute in a 3-0 victory. One month later he played his second game against 1461 Trabzon, again in the Turkish Cup. He replaced Caner Erkin after 62 minutes. On 7 April 2013, he made his league debut against Orduspor. He replaced striker Pierre Webó after 85 minutes.

Before the 2015–16 season, he reached an agreement with Sivasspor for a loan deal that will last for three years but in 2017 he moved to Altinordu on loan for end of 2016–17 season.
