= Bekir İrtegün =

Turkish footballer

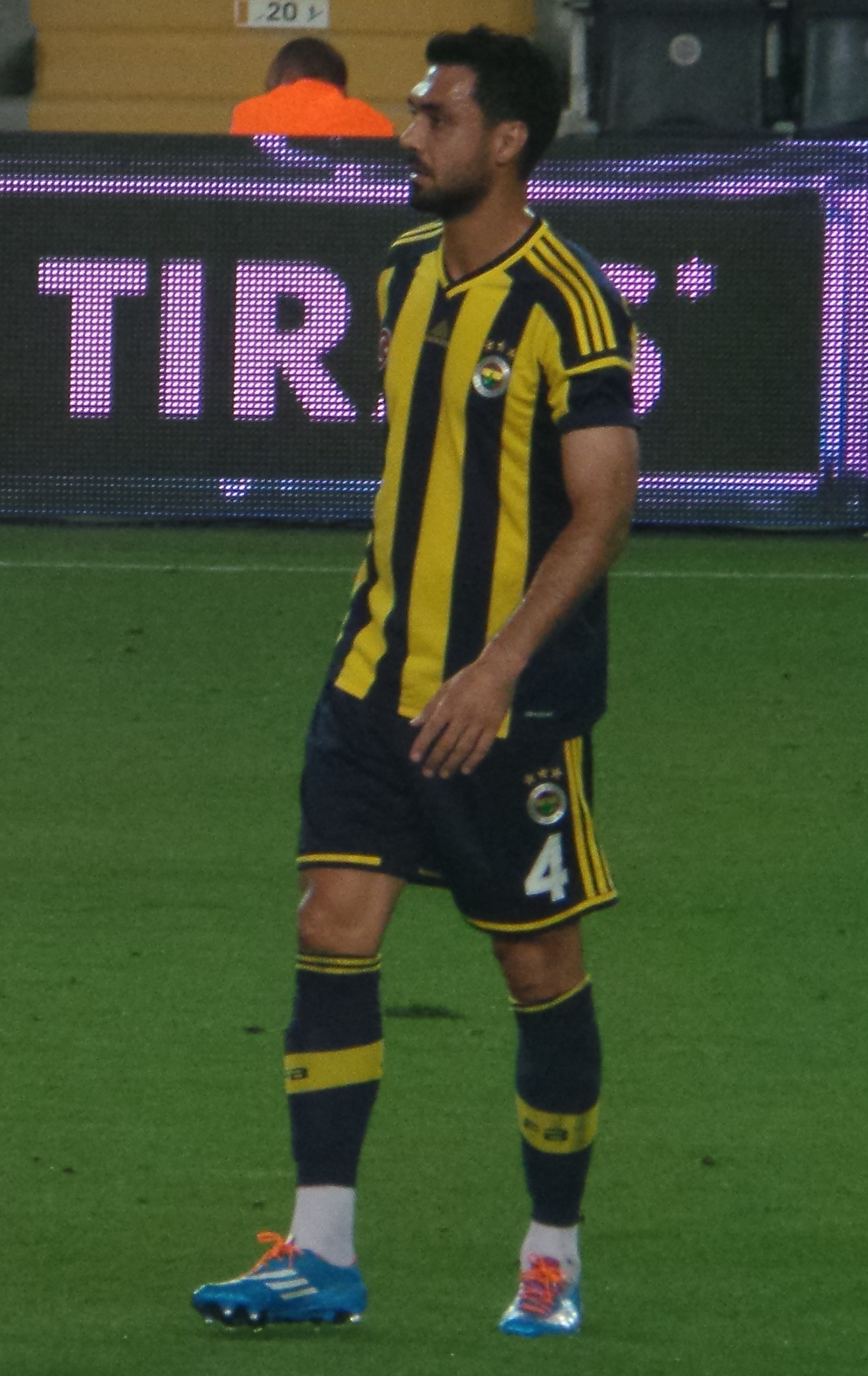
- İrtegün with Fenerbahçe in 2014

Personal information
- Date of birth: 20 April 1984 (age 42)
- Place of birth: Elazığ, Turkey
- Height: 1.85 m (6 ft 1 in)
- Position: Centre back

Youth career
- 1999–2001: Gaziantep B.B.
- 2001–2002: Gaziantepspor

Senior career*
Years	Team	Apps	(Gls)
2002–2009	Gaziantepspor	104	(2)
2009–2015	Fenerbahçe	109	(5)
2015–2017	İstanbul Başakşehir	42	(4)
2019–2020	Sakaryaspor	10	(0)

International career
1999	Turkey U15	2	(0)
1999–2000	Turkey U16	4	(0)
2002–2003	Turkey U19	10	(0)
2003–2004	Turkey U20	6	(0)
2004–2006	Turkey U21	19	(0)
2012–2014	Turkey	10	(0)

Managerial career
- 2023–2024: Tuzlaspor
- 2025: Adana 01
- 2026: Hatayspor
- * Club domestic league appearances and goals

Bekir İrtegün (born 20 April 1984) is a Turkish football coach and former professional player who played as a centre-back.

== Career ==
=== Club career ===
On 8 June 2009, İrtegün transferred to Turkish giants Fenerbahçe on a three-year deal.

=== İstanbul Başakşehir ===
On 1 July 2015, İrtegün agreed with İstanbul Başakşehir on a three + one years.

=== International career ===
İrtegün has represented Turkey since youth level, he has played for the under-15 team, the under-16 team, the under-19 team, the under-20 team and the under-21 team.

On 2 June 2012, İrtegün made his debut for the senior team in a 3-1 victory over Portugal in a Friendly.

== Honours ==
Fenerbahçe

- Süper Lig: 2010–11, 2013–14
- Turkish Cup: 2011–12, 2012–13
- Turkish Super Cup: 2009, 2014

== Prosecution ==
In the aftermath of the attempted coup d'etat of July 2016 he was charged of being a member of the Gülen movement. In January 2020 İrtegün was sentenced to 2 years and 3 months imprisonment for being a member of an armed terror organization due to his links to the Gülen movement.
