= Sezer Öztürk =

Turkish footballer

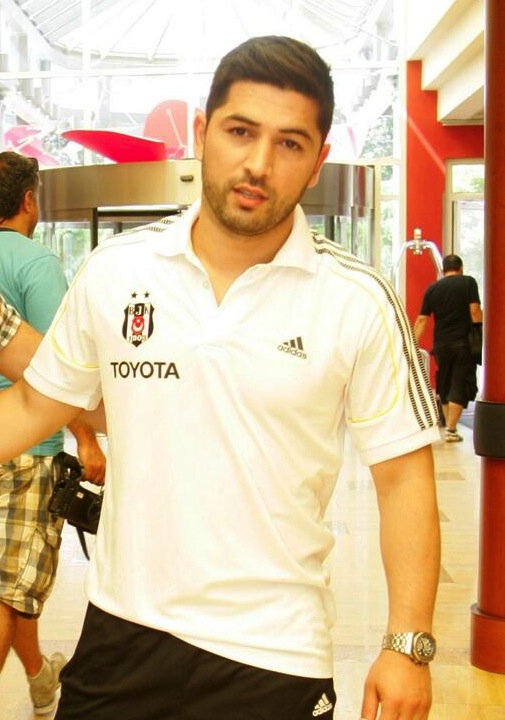

Personal information
- Full name: Sezer Öztürk
- Date of birth: 3 November 1985 (age 41)
- Place of birth: Velbert, West Germany
- Height: 1.74 m (5 ft 9 in)
- Positions: Attacking midfielder; central midfielder

Youth career
- Türkgücü Velbert
- SSVg Velbert
- TVD Velbert
- 1995–1996: Rot-Weiss Essen
- 1996–2005: Bayer Leverkusen II

Senior career*
Years	Team	Apps	(Gls)
2004–2006	Bayer Leverkusen	7	(0)
2005	→ Germinal (loan)	8	(1)
2006	1. FC Nürnberg	2	(0)
2006–2009	Manisaspor	76	(15)
2009–2011	Eskişehirspor	44	(9)
2011–2013	Fenerbahçe	15	(2)
2013–2016	Beşiktaş	0	(0)
2014–2015	→ İstanbul Başakşehir (loan)	8	(0)
2015	→ Eskişehirspor (loan)	11	(3)
Total		171	(30)

International career
1999–2001	Turkey U15	7	(1)
2000–2001	Turkey U16	4	(0)
2001	Turkey U17	2	(0)
2002	Turkey U18	5	(1)
2003–2004	Turkey U19	16	(4)
2005	Turkey U20	7	(2)
2006	Turkey B	1	(0)
- * Club domestic league appearances and goals

Sezer Öztürk (born 3 November 1985) is a Turkish former professional footballer who played as an attacking midfielder and central midfielder.

== Club career ==
Prior to 1996, Öztürk played for Türkgücü Velbert, SSVg Velbert, TVD Velbert and Rot-Weiss Essen. From 1996 to 2005, he achieved seven league matches for Bayer 04 Leverkusen, but only as substitute. In the 2005–06 season, Öztürk was loaned to the Belgian Cup winners Germinal Beerschot for one year in order to gather match practice. In January 2006, Öztürk moved to 1. FC Nürnberg.

In 2006, Öztürk joined Turkish Süper Lig side Vestel Manisaspor. For the second half of the 2009–10 season, he moved for a fee of TRY 1.6 million to Eskişehirspor and signed a contract until May 2012.

In 2011 summer transfer window, Öztürk joined then-defending champion Fenerbahçe on a four-year contract for €3.75 million.

Öztürk joined Beşiktaş in 2013 summer transfer window with €1.5 million transfer fee, but never made a professional debut there. In 2014–15 season, he was loaned out İstanbul Başakşehir. He was dropped out of squad and requested to find a club in 2015 and he was reportedly spotted as he was performing amateur boxing trainings and had gained weight.

== International career ==
Öztürk was runner-up in the European Championship with the U-19 national team of Turkey. In 2010, he was called up to the Turkey national team under new coach Guus Hiddink, for preparation in the U.S., but did not earn any caps.

== Murder incident ==
On 19 September 2021, Öztürk allegedly killed one and injured four with his gun in a traffic dispute in Şile, Turkey. He and a friend were attempting to cross a path that was blocked by bystanders. An argument followed and became a fight wherein Öztürk pulled out a gun and shot the bystanders, before fleeing the scene. The scene was captured by cell-phone cameras and security camera, but he remained at large as of 27 September 2021 with an arrest warrant for charges of "deliberate killing" and "deliberate injury".

== Honours ==
Fenerbahçe

- Turkish Cup: 2011–12, 2012–13
