= Selçuk Şahin (footballer, born 1981) =

Turkish footballer

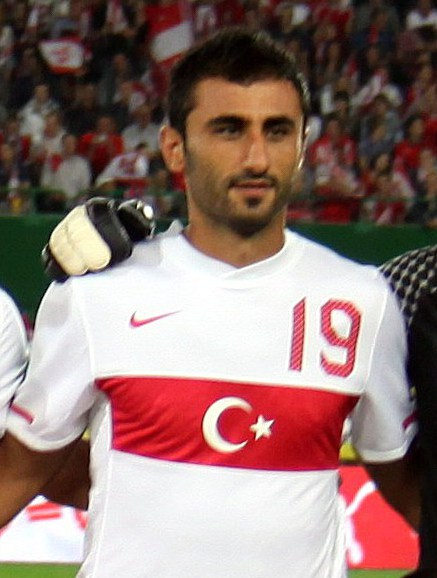
- Şahin playing for Turkey in 2011

Personal information
- Full name: Selçuk Şahin
- Date of birth: 31 January 1981 (age 45)
- Place of birth: Tunceli, Turkey
- Height: 1.88 m (6 ft 2 in)
- Position: Defensive midfielder

Senior career*
Years	Team	Apps	(Gls)
1999–2001	Hatayspor	41	(3)
2001–2003	İstanbulspor	69	(7)
2003–2015	Fenerbahçe	316	(18)
2015–2016	FC Wil	10	(0)
2016–2017	Gençlerbirliği	44	(4)
2017–2018	Göztepe	27	(2)
2018–2019	Gençlerbirliği	28	(2)
2019–2020	Bursaspor	18	(2)
Total		462	(31)

International career
2001–2003	Turkey U21	24	(0)
2003–2011	Turkey	25	(0)

Managerial career
- 2021–2023: Başakşehir (assistant)
- 2023–2025: Turkey (assistant)
- 2025: Eyüpspor
- 2026-: Batman Petrolspor
- * Club domestic league appearances and goals

Selçuk Şahin (Turkish pronunciation: [ˈsɛltʃuk ʃaːˈhin]; born 31 January 1981) is a Turkish professional football coach and former footballer who played as a defensive midfielder. He is currently managing Batman Petrolspor.

Over a professional career spanning more than two decades, he represented several clubs in Turkey and Switzerland, and earned international caps for the Turkey national team.

Şahin began his senior career with Hatayspor before moving to İstanbulspor in 2001. His performances earned him a transfer to Gençlerbirliği, where he won the Turkish Cup in 2001. In 2003, he signed for Fenerbahçe, becoming a mainstay in their midfield for 12 seasons. During his time at the club, he won six Süper Lig titles, two Turkish Cups, and three Turkish Super Cup trophies, and made over 300 official appearances. After leaving Fenerbahçe in 2015, he had spells with FC Wil in Switzerland, Gençlerbirliği, Göztepe, and Ümraniyespor before retiring from playing in 2021.

Internationally, Şahin was capped 25 times for Turkey between 2003 and 2011, scoring two goals. Although part of the extended squad during the UEFA Euro 2008 qualifying campaign, he was not selected for the final tournament squad.

Following his retirement, Şahin began his coaching career as an assistant to former teammate Emre Belözoğlu at İstanbul Başakşehir. In 2023, he joined the Turkey national team as part of head coach Vincenzo Montella’s technical staff. In 2025, he was appointed head coach of Eyüpspor, leading the club in the Süper Lig.

== Club career ==
Şahin turned professional with Hatayspor in 1999 before moving to İstanbulspor in 2001, where his performances earned him a transfer to Fenerbahçe in the summer of 2003. Between 2003 and 2015 he established himself as a long-serving holding midfielder at Fenerbahçe, featuring in title-winning squads across five Süper Lig seasons (2003–04, 2004–05, 2006–07, 2010–11, 2013–14). He also lifted the Turkish Cup twice (2011–12, 2012–13) and the Turkish Super Cup three times (2007, 2009, 2014), and was part of the team that reached the 2012–13 UEFA Europa League semi-finals.

In 2015 Şahin moved abroad to the Swiss second tier, signing for Wil. He returned to the Süper Lig with Gençlerbirliği in July 2016, later extending his stay for a second season.

In August 2018 he joined Göztepe on a one-year deal, before signing for Bursaspor in September 2019 to add experience during the club’s TFF 1. Lig rebuild. After featuring through the 2019–20 campaign, Şahin publicly announced his retirement from professional football in early 2021.

== International career ==
Şahin represented the Turkey national team in the early 2000s and won a bronze medal at the 2003 FIFA Confederations Cup in France.

== Managerial career ==
Following retirement, Şahin joined the technical staff at Başakşehir in October 2021, working as an assistant under head coach Emre Belözoğlu. During his stint the club remained in European qualification contention and made a deep domestic-cup run, culminating in the 2022–23 Turkish Cup final.

In September 2023, Şahin joined the Turkey national team as an assistant to head coach Vincenzo Montella, serving as part of the coaching staff during UEFA Euro 2024. He remained with the national side until the start of the 2024–25 season, when he left to pursue club management.

On 27 May 2025 he was appointed head coach of Eyüpspor, succeeding Arda Turan.

On 8 July 2026, he was appointed head coach of Batman Petrolspor.

== Playing style ==
A position-aware, physically strong defensive midfielder, Şahin was primarily used as a screen in front of the back four and as a game-manager in high-stakes fixtures for club and country.

== Statistics ==
=== Club ===
Club	Season	League			Domestic		UEFA		Total	
Club	Season	Division	Apps	Goals	Apps	Goals	Apps	Goals	Apps	Goals
Hatayspor	1999–00	1. Lig	6	0	0	0	–		6	0
Hatayspor	2000–01	1. Lig	34	3	0	0	–		34	3
Hatayspor	Total		40	3	0	0	–		40	3
İstanbulspor	2001–02	Süper Lig	32	2	3	0	–		35	2
İstanbulspor	2002–03	Süper Lig	33	4	1	0	–		34	4
İstanbulspor	Total		65	6	4	0	–		69	6
Fenerbahçe	2003–04	Süper Lig	25	1	2	1	–		27	2
Fenerbahçe	2004–05	Süper Lig	17	0	4	1	5	1	26	2
Fenerbahçe	2005–06	Süper Lig	17	1	4	0	5	0	26	1
Fenerbahçe	2006–07	Süper Lig	6	1	0	0	0	0	6	1
Fenerbahçe	2007–08	Süper Lig	22	2	5	1	6	0	33	3
Fenerbahçe	2008–09	Süper Lig	23	3	6	1	8	1	37	5
Fenerbahçe	2009–10	Süper Lig	21	1	9	0	7	0	37	1
Fenerbahçe	2010–11	Süper Lig	18	1	2	0	4	0	24	1
Fenerbahçe	2011–12	Süper Lig	28	0	2	1	–		30	1
Fenerbahçe	2012–13	Süper Lig	13	1	8	1	15	0	36	2
Fenerbahçe	2013–14	Süper Lig	17	0	1	0	3	0	21	0
Fenerbahçe	2014–15	Süper Lig	23	1	9	0	0	0	32	1
Fenerbahçe	Total		230	12	52	6	53	2	335	20
FC Wil	2015–16	Challenge League	10	0	2	1	–		12	1
FC Wil	Total		10	0	2	1	–		12	1
Gençlerbirliği	2015–16	Süper Lig	16	2	0	0	–		16	2
Gençlerbirliği	2016–17	Süper Lig	28	2	3	0	–		31	2
Gençlerbirliği	Total		44	4	3	0	–		47	4
Göztepe	2017–18	Süper Lig	27	2	0	0	–		27	2
Gençlerbirliği	2018–19	1. Lig	28	2	1	0	–		29	2
Bursaspor	2019–20	1. Lig	18	2	0	0	–		18	2
Career total			462	31	62	7	53	2	577	40

=== International ===
Appearances and goals by national team and year
National team	Year	Apps	Goals
Turkey	2004	7	0
Turkey	2005	7	0
Turkey	2006	1	0
Turkey	2008	2	0
Turkey	2010	3	0
Turkey	2011	5	0
Total		25	0

=== Managerial ===
As of match played 4 October 2025

Team	From	To	Record				
Team	From	To	G	W	D	L	Win %
Eyüpspor	25 May 2025	5 October 2025	8	1	2	5	12.50
Total			8	1	2	5	12.50

== Honours ==
Fenerbahçe

- Süper Lig: 2003–04, 2004–05, 2006–07, 2010–11, 2013–14
- Turkish Cup: 2011–12, 2012–13
- Turkish Super Cup: 2007, 2009, 2014

Turkey

- FIFA Confederations Cup: third place 2003
