= Cristian Baroni =

Brazilian footballer (born 1983)

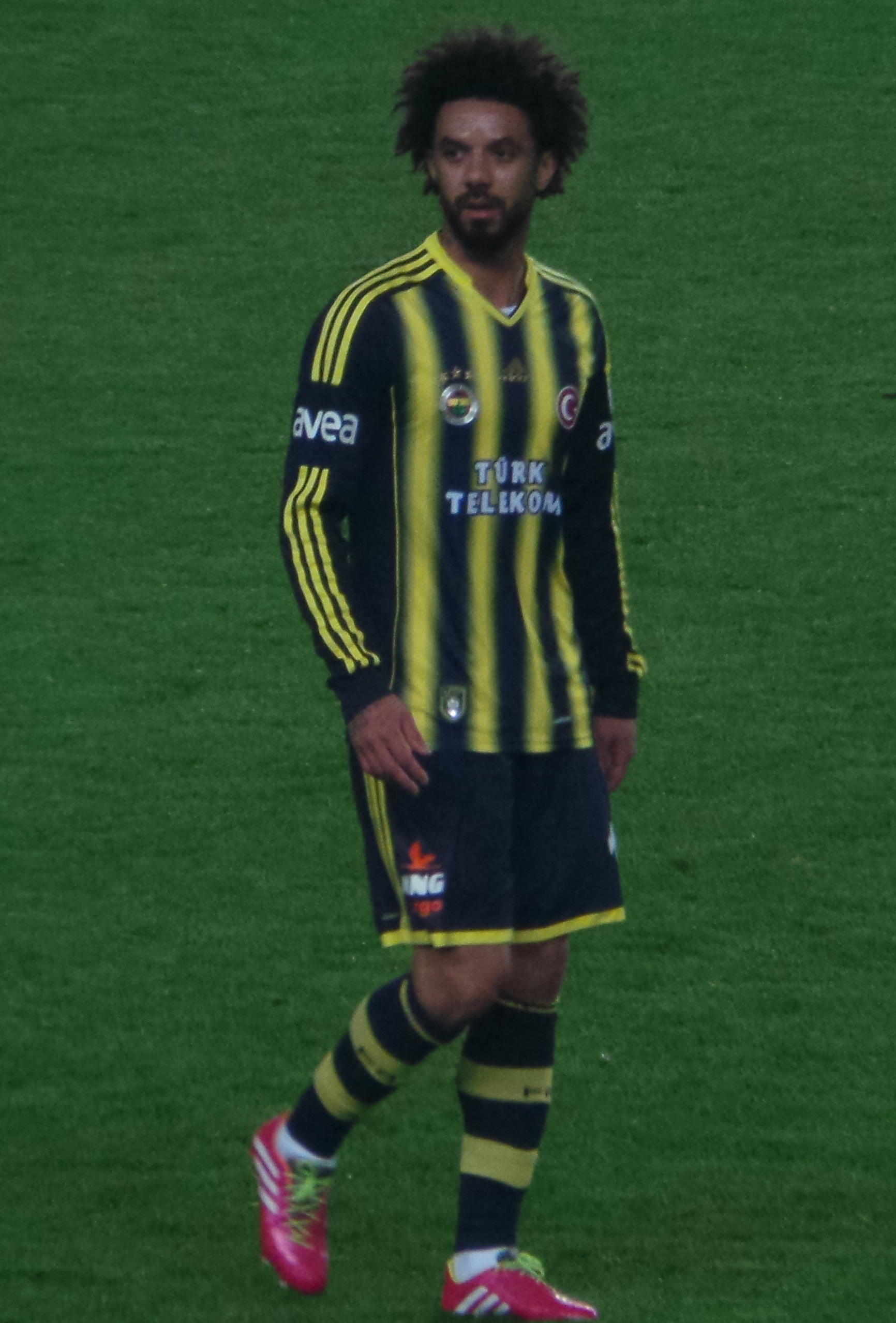
- Cristian playing for Fenerbahçe in 2014

Personal information
- Full name: Cristian Mark Junior Nascimento Oliveira Baroni
- Date of birth: 25 June 1983 (age 43)
- Place of birth: Belo Horizonte, Brazil
- Height: 1.83 m (6 ft 0 in)
- Position: Midfielder

Senior career*
Years	Team	Apps	(Gls)
2003–2005	Paulista	0	(0)
2005–2007	Atlético Paranaense	48	(3)
2007–2008	Flamengo	45	(2)
2009	Corinthians	39	(7)
2009–2014	Fenerbahçe	139	(20)
2015–2017	Corinthians	39	(2)
2017	→ Grêmio (loan)	5	(0)
2018–2019	São Caetano	5	(0)
2020	Juventus-SP	12	(1)
2021	Atibaia	13	(0)
Total		345	(35)
- * Club domestic league appearances and goals

Cristian Mark Junior Nascimento Oliveira Baroni (born 25 June 1983), known as Cristian Baroni or simply Cristian, is a Brazilian former professional footballer who played as a midfielder.

== Career ==
=== Early years ===
Cristian Baroni was champion of the Copa do Brasil in 2005 with Paulista de Jundiaí. In 2006, he was signed by Atlético Paranaense for a season. In 2007 went to Flamengo and had an important role participating in the rise of the Campeonato Brasileiro Série A campaign that year, in which Flamengo came out of the relegation zone and qualified for the Libertadores.

=== Corinthians ===
In 2008 Cristian Baroni remained in Flamengo, but was a reserve during many matches. At the end of 2008, he went to Corinthians and played for the time in the Campeonato Brasileiro Série B, following their relegation in 2007. In 2009 Campeonato Paulista, Cristian Baroni scored the goal that gave the victory to the Corinthians in the first leg of the semi-final against São Paulo missing 23 seconds to finish the game on Pacaembu. Cristian Baroni made obscene gestures to fans of São Paulo after scoring the late goal. A few months later he won the 2009 Copa do Brasil.

=== Fenerbahçe ===
On 20 July 2009, Fenerbahçe announced the signing of the player for €5 million. Fenerbahçe also signed the left wing André Santos and the midfielder from Corinthians, details of the agreement were not disclosed. He was also under the spotlight when he celebrated goals and showed his six fingers to the other team's supporters. Baroni renewed his contract June 2012, extending his stay at the club till 2013–14, the new agreement saw the Brazilian midfielder make €1.8 million per season. Cristian Baroni has earned the love of a Fenerbahçe fans for his football. One of his most important matches was played in Germany against Borussia Mönchengladbach. In that game Cristian Baroni scored two goals and had one assist. He was famous in Süper Lig for the remote shots. On 28 August 2014, his contract with Fenerbahce was terminated with mutual agreement.

=== Return to Corinthians ===
On 3 January 2015, after several years of speculation, it was confirmed that Cristian Baroni had indeed returned to Corinthians. He had a verbal agreement since December 2014 and signed the contract after being a free agent.

== Career statistics ==
As of match played 26 September 2016.

Appearances and goals by club, season and competition
Club	Season	League			State League		National cup (Note: Includes Turkish Cup.)		League cup		Continental		Other		Total	
Club	Season	Division	Apps	Goals	Apps	Goals	Apps	Goals	Apps	Goals	Apps	Goals	Apps	Goals	Apps	Goals
Paulista	2005	Série A	0	0	0	0			11	4	0	0	–		11	4
Atlético Paranaense	2006	Série A	26	3	0	0			0	0	8	1	–		34	4
Atlético Paranaense	2007	Série A	7	0	0	0			0	0	0	0	–		7	0
Atlético Paranaense	Total		33	3	0	0			0	0	8	1	0	0	41	4
Flamengo	2007	Série A	25	1	0	0			0	0	0	0	–		25	1
Flamengo	2008	Série A	18	1	0	0			0	0	6	0	–		24	1
Flamengo	Total		43	2	0	0			0	0	6	0	0	0	49	2
Corinthians	2009	Série A	9	2	19	3			3	1	0	0	–		31	6
Fenerbahçe	2009–10	Süper Lig	24	3	–		4	0	–		9	0	1 (Note: Appearance in Turkish Super Cup)	0	38	3
Fenerbahçe	2010–11	Süper Lig	28	0	–		3	0	–		4	0	0	0	35	0
Fenerbahçe	2011–12	Süper Lig	38	8	–		5	2	–		–		0	0	43	10
Fenerbahçe	2012–13	Süper Lig	31	5	–		8	3	–		18	3	1	0	58	11
Fenerbahçe	2013–14	Süper Lig	17	4	–		1	0	–		3	1	1	0	22	5
Fenerbahçe	2014–15	Süper Lig	0	0	–		0	0	–		0	0	0	0	0	0
Fenerbahçe	Total		138	20	0	0	21	5	0	0	34	4	3	0	196	29
Corinthians	2015	Série A	13	1	11	1			1	0	1	0	–		26	2
Corinthians	2016	Série A	10	0	2	0			1	0	1	0	–		14	0
Corinthians	Total		23	1	13	1			2	0	2	0	0	0	40	2
Career total			246	28	32	4	21	5	16	5	50	5	3	0	368	47

== Honours ==
Paulista

- Copa do Brasil: 2005

Flamengo

- Taça Guanabara: 2008
- Campeonato Carioca: 2008

Corinthians

- Campeonato Brasileiro Série B: 2008
- Campeonato Paulista: 2009
- Copa do Brasil: 2009
- Campeonato Brasileiro Série A: 2015

Fenerbahçe

- Süper Lig: 2010–11, 2013–14
- Turkish Cup: 2011–12, 2012-13
- Turkish Super Cup: 2009, 2014

Grêmio

- Copa Libertadores: 2017
