= Egemen Korkmaz =

Turkish footballer (born 1982)

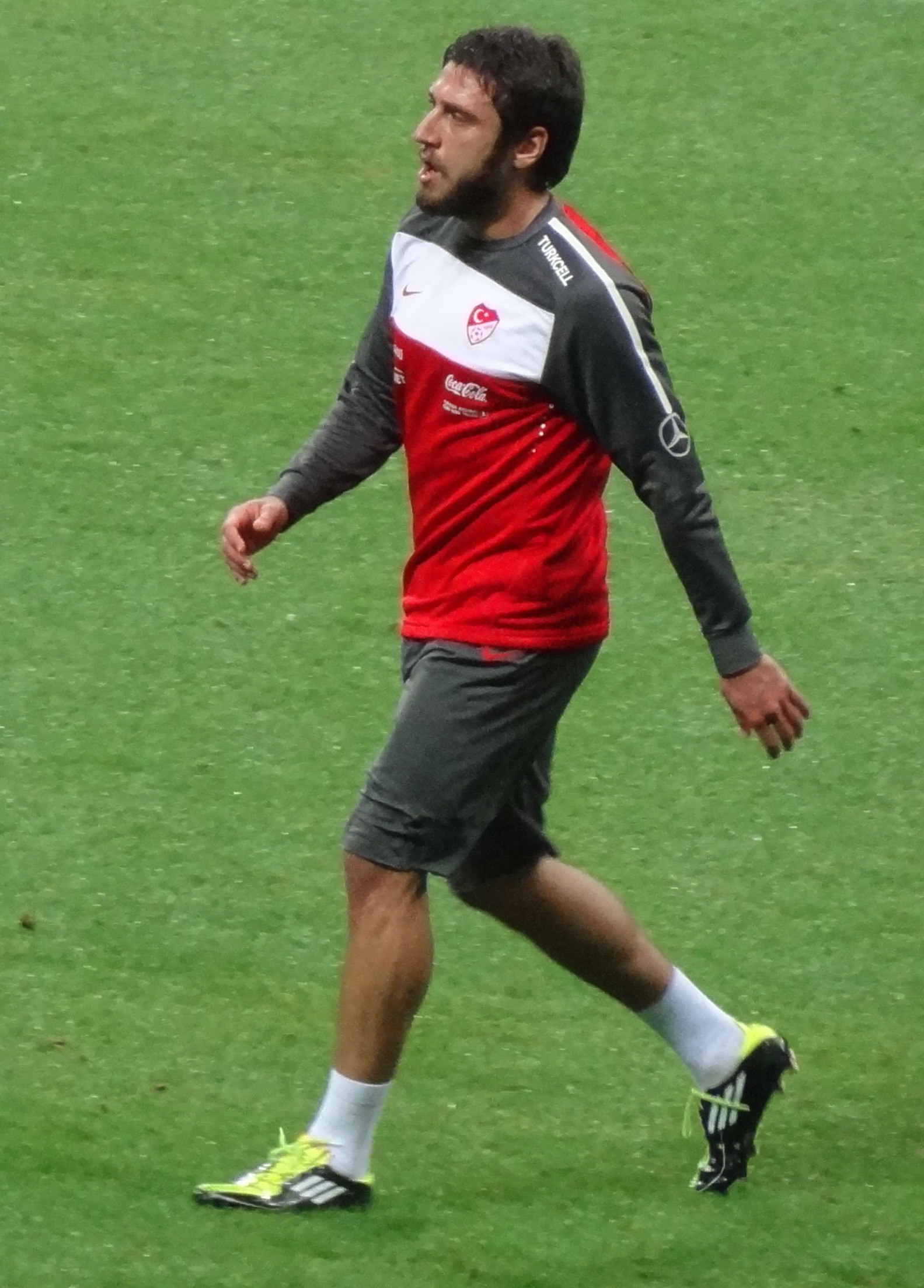
- Korkmaz with Turkey in 2012

Personal information
- Full name: Egemen Korkmaz
- Date of birth: 3 November 1982 (age 44)
- Place of birth: Balıkesir, Turkey
- Height: 1.83 m (6 ft 0 in)
- Position: Centre-back

Team information
- Current team: Turkey U-21 (head coach)

Senior career*
Years	Team	Apps	(Gls)
1999–2000	Balıkesirspor	14	(0)
2000–2002	Kartalspor	41	(4)
2002–2008	Bursaspor	154	(5)
2008–2011	Trabzonspor	84	(6)
2011–2012	Beşiktaş	36	(2)
2012–2015	Fenerbahçe	57	(11)
2015–2017	FC Wil	31	(4)
2017–2018	İstanbul Başakşehir	0	(0)
2018–2019	BB Erzurumspor	20	(1)

International career
2000	Turkey U18	2	(0)
2001	Turkey U20	6	(0)
2003	Turkey U21	4	(0)
2006	Turkey A2	1	(0)
2011–2012	Turkey	9	(0)

Managerial career
- 2019–2020: Denizlispor (assistant coach)
- 2020: BB Erzurumspor (assistant coach)
- 2020–2022: Trabzonspor (assistant coach)
- 2023–2024: Trabzonspor (assistant coach)
- 2025–: Turkey U-21
- * Club domestic league appearances and goals

Egemen Korkmaz (born 3 November 1982) is a Turkish former professional footballer who played as a centre-back and works as an assistant coach of Abdullah Avcı at Trabzonspor.

== Early years ==
After starting in 1999 in the amateur football team Balıkesirspor, Egemen signed a professional contract with Kartalspor in 2000. Next season in 2001, Bursaspor transferred him, where he stayed until the end of the 2007–08; going onto playing 155 League games, while managing to score five goals. During his time in Bursaspor, he was given the role of team captain. His successful performances, drew the attention of some big teams in Turkey.

== Career ==
=== Trabzonspor ===
Egemen Korkmaz Bursaspor ended with the agreement at the end of the year, the summer transfer period 2008–09, Çağdaş Atan who want to close the gap as a result of leaving the club Trabzonspor has scored in three years. After the transfer of Trabzonspor also wore Bursaspor; Bursa province the plate code "16" continued to wear the uniform number. However, in 2009 played on 17 May Trabzonspor Trabzonspor-Bursaspor match 1–0, then "16" jersey number, and shake off the stands to fans going to the center field triple-puller; Bursaspor community has raised concern. [3] A 'is transferred to the first year, was named player of the year by fans. [4] takes over as head coach of Trabzonspor Hugo Broos and the contract is not extended as a result of the transfer Bursaspor former club captain Hüseyin Çimşir, Egemen Korkmaz before the 2009–10 season was announced as the captain of Trabzonspor. Dominant young national teams, including the name of Turkey played 15 times in total. A chance for the national team has found three times in the first 11. Strong supporters of physics due to the structure itself, "Gladiator" was appropriate moniker. İstanbul Büyükşehir Belediyesi S.K. match played on 14 September 2009 with "3" by scoring hatrick took its place among the defenders. After encountering a statement: "can not get 3 goals in a season." he said. A day after the match to him by the management of the FC United match winning premium show superior performance to due was decided to give two times the premium. The dominant athletes in the infrastructure to distribute the club announced that the extra premium.

=== Beşiktaş ===
On 25 May 2011, he signed a four-year contract signed with Turkish club Beşiktaş. Sovereign, the captain had come to the field with his number 16 in Bursa and Trabzon. Black-and-white club experienced players instead of tension between the plate of Bursa in the uniform number 55 was chosen. Egemen Korkmaz Besiktas, who had a very successful season, including 36 cases a total of 50 match played in the league. While a total of 4 goals in 15 yellow, 1 red card he saw. On 2 June, because of concern for the future, he terminated his contract with Beşiktaş. On 4 July 2012, he was transferred to Fenerbahçe on a free transfer.

=== Fenerbahçe ===
On 4 July 2012, he completed a free transfer to Fenerbahçe and was given the number 2 shirt, formerly held by Diego Lugano. He scored his first goal with the team in a UEFA Europa League match against AEL Limassol. On 25 April 2013, Korkmaz scored the only goal in the game against Benfica in the UEFA Europa League semi-finals. Although Fenerbahçe won their first game while at home, they lost at Portugal and were eliminated. The same season, Korkmaz won his second Turkish cup with a team and Fenerbahçe continued from their success in the previous year, in which they finally won the cup, first time since 1983. Korkmaz won his first league title in the 2013–2014 season with Fenerbahçe.

=== FC Wil 1900 ===
In July 2015, he joined Swiss club FC Wil 1900.

=== Return to Turkey ===
In January 2017, Egemen Korkmaz signed for İstanbul Başakşehir and made his return to Turkish football. He played his first official match against Yeni Amasyaspor in a Turkish Cup match but failed to make a single league appearance. In July 2018, he signed for Büyükşehir Belediye Erzurumspor on a free.

== Honours ==
Bursaspor

- First Lig: 2005–06

Trabzonspor

- Turkish Cup: 2009–10
- Turkish Super Cup: 2010

Fenerbahçe

- Süper Lig: 2013–14
- Turkish Cup: 2012–13
- Turkish Super Cup: 2014
