= 2010–11 Fenerbahçe S.K. season =

Fenerbahçe
2010–11 season
- President: Aziz Yıldırım
- Head coach: Aykut Kocaman
- Stadium: Şükrü Saracoğlu Stadium
- Süper Lig: 1st
- Turkish Cup: Group stage
- UEFA Champions League: Third qualifying round
- UEFA Europa League: Play-off round
- Top goalscorer: League: Alex (28 goals); All: Alex (28 goals)
Home colours	Away colours	Third colours

The 2010–11 Fenerbahçe S.K. season was the club's 53rd consecutive season in the Süper Lig and their 104th year in existence. They also competed for a short while in the UEFA Champions League, eliminated in the third qualifying round. On 22 May, 2011, Fenerbahçe won 18th Turkish league title, but refused entry to next season's UEFA Champions League due to a falsified report from Turkish Football Federation regarding alleged match-fixing. The accused have later been cleared of all charges.

== News ==
On 20 May, 2010, started sales for combined cards. On 10 June, 2010, Miroslav Stoch joined the club from Chelsea. On 25 June, Christoph Daum was fired as head coach; Aykut Kocaman was named his replacement. On 21 July, Fenerbahçe played rivals Galatasaray in the Spor Toto Dostluk Kupası, hosted at the Borussia-Park in Mönchengladbach, Germany, with Fenerbahçe winning 1–0. Also on 21 July, Senagalese winger Issiar Dia joined the club from French side Nancy.

== Kits ==
Fenerbahçe's 2010–11 kits, manufactured by Adidas, were introduced on 23 July, 2010, at the Şükrü Saracoğlu Stadium. The home kit was named "Çubuklu Forma", meaning "Striped Kit" in English; the away kit was named "Kanarya Forma", meaning "Canary Kit"; the third kit was named "Fenerbahçe Güneşi", meaning "Sun of Fenerbahçe"; and the fourth kit was named "Palamut Forma", meaning "Oak Leaf Kit".

- Supplier: Adidas
- Main sponsor: Avea
- Back sponsor: Ülker
- Sleeve sponsor: Türk Telekom
- Short sponsor: –
- Socks sponsor: –

Home
Away
Third
Fourth
Goalkeeper Home
Goalkeeper Away
Goalkeeper Third

== Transfers ==
=== In ===
No.	Pos.	Nat.	Name	Age	Moving from	Type	Transfer window	Ends	Transfer fee	Source
3	DF	(Nigeria)	Joseph Yobo	29	Everton (England)	Loan	Summer	2011	N/A	Fenerbahce.org
85	GK	(Turkey)	Serkan Kırıntılı	25	MKE Ankaragücü	Transfer	Summer	2012	Free	Fenerbahce.org
7	FW	(Senegal)	Mamadou Niang	30	Marseille (France)	Transfer	Summer	2013	€8M	Fenerbahce.org
92	MF	(Senegal)	Issiar Dia	23	Nancy (France)	Transfer	Summer	2014	€6,500,000	Fenerbahce.org
6	DF	(Turkey)	İlhan Eker	30	Gençlerbirliği	Transfer	Summer	2013	Free	Fenerbahce.org
11	MF	(Slovakia)	Miroslav Stoch	20	Chelsea (England)	Transfer	Summer	2014	€5,500,000	Fenerbahce.org
88	DF	(Turkey)	Caner Erkin	21	CSKA Moscow (Russia)	Transfer	Summer	2014	€2,000,000	Fenerbahce.org

Total spending: ▼€22 million

=== Out ===
No.	Pos.	Nat.	Name	Age	Moving to	Type	Transfer window	Transfer fee	Source
17	MF	(Turkey)	Ali Bilgin	28	Kayserispor	Released	Summer	Free	Kayserispor.org.tr
6	MF	(Turkey)	Gökçek Vederson	28	Bursaspor	End of contract	Summer	Free	Bursaspor.org.tr
24	DF	(Turkey)	Deniz Barış	32	Antalyaspor	Released	Summer	Free	Antalyaspor.com.tr
19	DF	(Turkey)	Önder Turacı	29	Kayserispor	Released	Summer	Free	Kayserispor.org.tr
15	GK	(Turkey)	Volkan Babacan	22	Kayserispor	Loan	Summer	Free	Kayserispor.org.tr
99	FW	(Brazil)	Deivid	30	Flamengo (Brazil)	Released	Summer	Free	Flamengo.com.br
39	FW	(Turkey)	Gökhan Ünal	28	İstanbul B.B.	Loan	Winter	N/A	Ibbspor.com
8	FW	(Turkey)	Colin Kazim-Richards	23	Galatasaray	Released	Winter	Free	Galatasaray.org

Total income: ▲ N/A

== First-team squad ==
Note: Flags indicate national team as defined under FIFA eligibility rules; some limited exceptions apply. Players may hold more than one non-FIFA nationality.

No.	Pos.	Nation	Player
1	GK	TUR	Volkan Demirel
2	DF	URU	Diego Lugano
3	DF	NGR	Joseph Yobo (on loan from Everton)
4	DF	TUR	Bekir İrtegün
5	MF	TUR	Emre Belözoğlu (vice-captain)
6	DF	TUR	İlhan Eker
7	FW	SEN	Mamadou Niang
9	FW	ESP	Dani Güiza
10	MF	BRA	Alex (captain)
11	MF	SVK	Miroslav Stoch
14	MF	TUR	Gökay Iravul
16	MF	BRA	Cristian
17	DF	TUR	Okan Alkan
20	MF	TUR	Özer Hurmacı

No.	Pos.	Nation	Player
21	MF	TUR	Selçuk Şahin
22	GK	TUR	Ertuğrul Taşkıran
23	FW	TUR	Semih Şentürk (vice-captain)
25	MF	TUR	Uğur Boral
27	DF	BRA	André Santos
29	FW	TUR	Berk Elitez
34	GK	TUR	Mert Günok
35	DF	TUR	Hasan Erbey
38	MF	TUR	Mehmet Topuz
58	DF	BRA	Fábio Bilica
77	DF	TUR	Gökhan Gönül
85	GK	TUR	Serkan Kırıntılı
88	MF	TUR	Caner Erkin
92	MF	SEN	Issiar Dia

=== Out on loan ===
Note: Flags indicate national team as defined under FIFA eligibility rules; some limited exceptions apply. Players may hold more than one non-FIFA nationality.

No.	Pos.	Nation	Player
15	GK	TUR	Volkan Babacan (at Kayserispor until July 2011)
18	MF	TUR	Abdülkadir Kayalı (at İstanbul B.B. until July 2011)

No.	Pos.	Nation	Player
39	FW	TUR	Gökhan Ünal (at İstanbul B.B. until July 2011)
67	DF	TUR	Onur Karakabak (at Manisaspor until July 2011)

== Squad statistics ==
No.	Pos.	Player	League		Cup		Europe		Total		Discipline	
No.	Pos.	Player	Apps.	Goal	Apps.	Goal	Apps.	Goal	Apps.	Goal	Yellow card	Red card
1	GK	(Turkey) Volkan Demirel	32	0	0	0	4	0	36	0	4	0
2	DF	(Uruguay) Diego Lugano	28	7	2	2	2	0	32	9	14	1
3	DF	(Nigeria) Joseph Yobo	30	1	3	0	0	0	33	1	3	0
4	DF	(Turkey) Bekir İrtegün	14	1	2	0	2	0	18	1	8	0
5	MF	(Turkey) Emre Belözoğlu	27	3	1	0	3	2	31	5	8	0
6	DF	(Turkey) İlhan Eker	1	0	1	0	2	0	4	0	0	0
7	FW	(Senegal) Mamadou Niang	29	15	2	0	2	0	33	15	5	0
9	FW	(Spain) Dani Güiza	3	1	1	0	0	0	4	1	0	0
10	MF	(Brazil) Alex	33	28	1	0	4	0	37	28	3	0
11	FW	(Slovakia) Miroslav Stoch	23	2	4	0	3	1	29	3	3	1
14	MF	(Turkey) Gökay Iravul	11	0	2	0	0	0	13	0	1	0
16	MF	(Brazil) Cristian	28	0	3	0	4	0	35	0	3	0
17	DF	(Turkey) Okan Alkan	2	0	2	0	0	0	4	0	0	0
20	MF	(Turkey) Özer Hurmacı	14	0	3	0	2	0	19	0	3	0
21	MF	(Turkey) Selçuk Şahin	18	1	3	0	3	0	24	1	5	1
22	GK	(Turkey) Ertuğrul Taşkıran	0	0	0	0	0	0	0	0	0	0
23	FW	(Turkey) Semih Şentürk	25	10	4	4	2	0	31	14	3	0
25	MF	(Turkey) Uğur Boral	0	0	1	0	0	0	1	0	0	0
27	DF	(Brazil) André Santos	25	5	4	1	3	0	32	6	5	0
29	FW	(Turkey) Berk Elitez	0	0	0	0	0	0	0	0	0	0
34	GK	(Turkey) Mert Günok	3	0	2	0	0	0	5	0	0	0
35	DF	(Turkey) Hasan Erbey	0	0	0	0	0	0	0	0	0	0
38	MF	(Turkey) Mehmet Topuz	34	1	1	0	2	0	37	1	4	0
58	DF	(Brazil) Bilica	8	0	1	0	3	0	12	0	4	0
77	DF	(Turkey) Gökhan Gönül	27	3	2	0	2	0	31	3	7	0
85	GK	(Turkey) Serkan Kırıntılı	0	0	2	0	0	0	2	0	0	0
88	MF	(Turkey) Caner Erkin	22	1	3	0	1	0	26	1	6	1
92	FW	(Senegal) Issiar Dia	25	2	3	0	1	0	29	2	0	0
Players sold or loaned out after the start of the season
8	FW	(Turkey) Colin Kazim-Richards	5	0	1	0	1	0	6	0	3	1
39	FW	(Turkey) Gökhan Ünal	3	0	1	0	4	0	8	0	0	0
Last updated: 22 May 2011

== Club ==
=== Board of directors ===
President	(Turkey) Aziz Yıldırım
Deputy-president/Press Spokesman	(Turkey) Nihat Özdemir
Secretary general	(Turkey) Vedat Olcay
Vice-president/Member	(Turkey) Ali Koç
Vice-president, Financial and Project	(Turkey) Nihat Özbağı
Member	(Turkey) Alaeddin Yıldırım
Vice-president/Member	(Turkey) Osman Murat Özaydınlı
Vice-president, Social Organisations & Associations	(Turkey) Mithat Yenigün
Vice-president, Amateur Departments	(Turkey) Mahmut Nedim Uslu
Vice-president, Formal Association Relations	(Turkey) Serhat Çeçen
Vice-president, Law & Institutional Relations	(Turkey) Şekip Mosturoğlu
Football and Stadium Infrastructure	(Turkey) Ömer Temelli
Social Organisations	(Turkey) Ünal Uzun
Fenerbahçe Training Company	(Turkey) Turan Şahin

Source: Board of Directors

=== Technical staff ===
Position	Staff
Head Coach	(Turkey) Aykut Kocaman
Assistant Coach	(Turkey) İsmail Kartal
Fitness Coach	(Turkey) Alper Aşçı
Goalkeeping Coach	(Turkey) Murat Öztürk

Last updated: 26 June
Source: Fenerbahce.org

=== Medical staff ===
Position	Staff
Doctor	(Turkey) Ertuğrul Karanlık
Physiotherapist	(Turkey) Orhan Şakir
Masseur	(Turkey) Özkan Alaca

Last updated: 26 June
Source: Fenerbahce.org

== Pre-season friendlies ==
Win Draw Loss Postponed

14 July 2010 Friendly	Fenerbahçe (Turkey)	0–2	(Netherlands) AZ	Cologne, Germany
		Report	Klavan 51'; Guðmundsson 80'	Stadium: Bezirkssportanlage

18 July 2010 Friendly	Fenerbahçe (Turkey)	2–5	(Germany) 1. FC Köln	Cologne, Germany
	Deivid 50'; Stoch 88'	Report	Freis 13', 53'; Taner Yalçın 42', 45'; Yabo 83'	Stadium: RheinEnergieStadion

19 July 2010 Friendly	Fenerbahçe (Turkey)	3–0	(Belgium) Genk	Genk, Belgium
	Ünal 65'; Alex 75'; Şahin 84'	Report		Stadium: Cristal Arena

21 July 2010 Peace Cup	Fenerbahçe (Turkey)	1–0	(Turkey) Galatasaray	Mönchengladbach, Germany
	Şahin (yellow card) 14' (yellow-red card) 14'; Santos 29'	Report		Stadium: Borussia-Park; Attendance: 35 000; Referee: Thorsten Kinhöfer, Mark Borsch, Kai Voss Germany

4 September 2010 Republic Cup	Sivasspor (Turkey)	0–3	(Turkey) Fenerbahçe	Sivas, Turkey
	Ramović (yellow card) 90'	Report	Bilica 32'; Ünal 50'; Elitez 77'	Stadium: Sivas 4 Eylül Stadium; Referee: Kadir Bitigen

12 October 2010 Friendly	Batman Petrolspor (Turkey)	0–2	(Turkey) Fenerbahçe	Batman, Turkey
		Report	Mehmet Topuz 44'; Kazim-Richards 66'	Stadium: Batman 16 Mayıs Stadium

16 January 2011 Friendly	Fenerbahçe (Turkey)	0–0	(Turkey) Samsunspor	Antalya, Turkey
	Stoch (yellow card) 80'	Report	Bayraktar (yellow card) 70'	Stadium: Antalya Mardan Stadium; Referee: Hüseyin Göçek

== Competitions ==
=== Süper Lig ===
==== League table ====
Pos	Team	Pld	W	D	L	GF	GA	GD	Pts	Qualification or relegation
1	Fenerbahçe (C)	34	26	4	4	84	34	+50	82	
2	Trabzonspor	34	25	7	2	69	23	+46	82	Qualification to Champions League group stage (Note: Originally, Fenerbahçe qualified for the group stage and Trabzonspor qualified for the third qualifying round. Despite being eliminated in the third qualifying round and passed to the UEFA Europa League play-off round, Trabzonspor replaced Fenerbahçe after the Turkish Football Federation withdrew Fenerbahçe from the UEFA Champions League one day before the group stage draw due to match-fixing allegations. UEFA would then select Trabzonspor as their replacement.)
3	Bursaspor	34	17	10	7	50	29	+21	61	Qualification to Europa League third qualifying round
4	Gaziantepspor	34	17	8	9	44	33	+11	59	Qualification to Europa League second qualifying round
5	Beşiktaş	34	15	9	10	53	36	+17	54	Qualification to Europa League play-off round (Note: Beşiktaş have won the 2010–11 Turkish Cup competition and thus are qualified for the play-off round of the UEFA Europa League.)

Source: tff.org (in Turkish)
Rules for classification: 1) points; 2) goal difference; 3) number of goals scored.
(C) Champions

==== Results summary ====
Overall								Home						Away					
Pld	W	D	L	GF	GA	GD	Pts	W	D	L	GF	GA	GD	W	D	L	GF	GA	GD
34	26	4	4	84	34	+50	82	14	3	0	41	8	+33	12	1	4	43	26	+17

Last updated: 22 May 2011.
Source: Competitive Matches

==== Results by round ====
Round	1	2	3	4	5	6	7	8	9	10	11	12	13	14	15	16	17	18	19	20	21	22	23	24	25	26	27	28	29	30	31	32	33	34
Ground	H	A	H	A	H	A	H	A	H	A	H	A	H	A	H	A	H	A	H	A	H	A	H	A	H	A	H	A	H	A	H	A	H	A
Result	W	L	W	L	D	W	W	W	D	D	W	L	W	W	W	L	W	W	W	W	W	W	W	W	W	W	D	W	W	W	W	W	W	W
Position	1	5	4	5	9	6	4	4	4	4	4	5	4	4	3	3	3	3	3	3	2	2	1	1	1	1	2	2	2	1	1	1	1	1

Updated to match(es) played on 22 May 2011. Source: Competitive Matches
A = Away; H = Home; W = Win; D = Draw; L = Loss

==== Matches ====
Win Draw Loss Postponed

15 August 2010 1	Fenerbahçe	4–0	Antalyaspor	Istanbul
21.45 EET	Semih 8', 13'; Alex 24'; Gönül 28'	Report	(yellow card) 56' Necati; (yellow card) 63' Ağçay	Stadium: Şükrü Saracoğlu Stadium; Referee: Bülent Yıldırım

23 August 2010 2	Trabzonspor	3–2	Fenerbahçe	Trabzon
21.00 EET	Topuz 14' (o.g.); Yattara 16'; Glowacki 29'; Korkmaz (yellow card) 44'; Gülselam (yellow card) 77'; Kıvrak (yellow card) 88'; Barış (yellow card) 89'	Report	28' Lugano; 42' Topuz; (yellow card) 58' Cristian	Stadium: Hüseyin Avni Aker Stadium; Referee: Bünyamin Gezer

29 August 2010 3	Fenerbahçe	4–2	Manisaspor	Istanbul
20:00 EET	Alex 17'; Cristian (yellow card) 35'; Lugano 62'; Niang 69', 74'	Report	48' Isaac; (yellow card) 52' Bekir; 77' Simpson; (yellow card) 83' Tok; (yellow card) 84' Çökmüş	Stadium: Şükrü Saracoğlu Stadium; Referee: Halis Özkahya

12 September 2010 4	Kayserispor	2–0	Fenerbahçe	Kayseri
19.00 EET	Kaldırım (yellow card) 35'; Cángele (yellow card) 37'; Santana 66'; Furkan 68'; Kesimal (yellow card) 83'	Report	(yellow card) 23' Lugano; (yellow card) 82' Emre	Stadium: Kadir Has Stadium; Attendance: 15000

19 September 2010 5	Fenerbahçe	1–1	Beşiktaş	Istanbul
20.00 EET	Niang 26'; Bilica (yellow card) 45'; Selçuk (yellow card) 50'; Volkan (yellow card) 84'	Report	(yellow card) 45' Quaresma; (yellow card) 45' İ. Üzülmez; (yellow card) 79' Ernst; 86' (pen.) Guti	Stadium: Şükrü Saracoğlu Stadium; Attendance: 43287; Referee: Cüneyt Çakır

27 September 2010 6	Kasımpaşa	2–6	Fenerbahçe	Istanbul
20.00 EET	Aygüneş 6'; E. Martin (yellow card) 16'; Teber (yellow card) 24'; E. Martin 25'	Report	15' (pen.), 90+5' Alex; 21' Emre; 24', 64', 90' (yellow card) 88' Niang; (yellow card) 35' Lugano	Stadium: Ali Sami Yen Stadium; Referee: Mustafa Kamil Abitoğlu

2 October 2010 7	Fenerbahçe	3–0	Gençlerbirliği	Istanbul
19.00 EET	Niang 21'; Demir 26' (o.g.); Emre (yellow card) 61'; Gönül (yellow card) 66'; Santos 88'	Report	(yellow card) 50' (yellow-red card) 67' Jedinak; (yellow card) 81' Şam	Stadium: Şükrü Saracoğlu Stadium; Referee: Fırat Aydınus

18 October 2010 8	Konyaspor	1–4	Fenerbahçe	Konya
20.00 EET	Grajciar 30'; Lietava (yellow card) 32'; E. Toraman (yellow card) 44'; Karaduman (yellow card) 45'; B. Abbas (yellow card) 64'	Report	(yellow card) 13' Caner; 26' Emre; 33' Semih; 40' Stoch; 64' Lugano; (yellow card) 79' Santos	Stadium: Konya Atatürk Stadium; Referee: Abdullah Yılmaz

24 October 2010 9	Fenerbahçe	0–0	Galatasaray	Istanbul
20.00 EET	Emre (yellow card) 35'; Lugano (yellow card) 68'	Report	(yellow card) 24' Neill; (yellow card) 42' Ayhan; (yellow card) 83' Pino	Stadium: Şükrü Saracoğlu Stadium; Referee: Bülent Yıldırım

29 October 2010 10	Bursaspor	1–1	Fenerbahçe	Bursa
20.00 EET	Turgay (yellow card) 25'; Ergić 51'; Tandoğan (yellow card) 70'	Report	17' Semih; (yellow card) 45' Topuz; (yellow card) 59' Bilica; (yellow card) 82' Santos; (yellow card) 90' Caner	Stadium: Bursa Atatürk Stadium; Referee: Cüneyt Çakır

6 November 2010 11	Fenerbahçe	4–2	Eskişehirspor	Istanbul
19.00 EET	Alex 3' (pen.); Semih 18', 72'; Gönül 45'; Lugano (yellow card) 37' (red card) 45'; Kazim-Richards (yellow card) 77'	Report	13' (yellow card) 37' (red card) 45' Sezer; (yellow card) 21' Koray; 65' Serdar	Stadium: Şükrü Saracoğlu Stadium; Referee: Bünyamin Gezer

1 November 2010 12	Gaziantepspor	2–1	Fenerbahçe	Gaziantep
19.00 EET	S. Kurtuluş (yellow card) 53' (goal) 78'; Taşdelen (yellow card) 62'; Yalçın (yellow card) 70'; Olcan 85'	Report	18' (yellow card) 67' Alex; (yellow card) 36' Bekir	Stadium: Kamil Ocak Stadium; Attendance: 15000; Referee: Tolga Özkalfa

21 November 2010 13	Fenerbahçe	5–2	Bucaspor	Istanbul
20.00 EET	Alex 1', 13', 23'; Niang 81'; Semih 86'	Report	(yellow card) 42' Güneş; (yellow card) 53' Taşkıran; 65' Manucho; (yellow card) 73' Ediz; 87' Aydın	Stadium: Şükrü Saracoğlu Stadium; Referee: Mustafa Kamil Abitoğlu

28 November 2010 14	Istanbul B.B.	0–1	Fenerbahçe	Istanbul
19.00 EET	Holmen (yellow card) 23'; İnanç (yellow card) 45'; Ekşioğlu (yellow card) 78' (yellow-red card) 78'	Report	(yellow card) 29' (goal) 33' Alex; (yellow card) 44' Caner; (yellow card) 48' Gönül	Stadium: Atatürk Olympic Stadium; Attendance: 30000; Referee: Halis Özkahya

5 December 2010 15	Fenerbahçe	2–1	Karabükspor	Istanbul
19.00 EET	Lugano 9'; Alex 18'; Niang (yellow card) 41'	Report	(yellow card) 3' Šerić; (yellow card) 27' Yasin; 47' Emenike; (yellow card) 88' Çoğum; (yellow card) 90+4' Bal	Stadium: Şükrü Saracoğlu Stadium; Referee: Bünyamin Gezer

12 December 2010 16	MKE Ankaragücü	2–1	Fenerbahçe	Ankara
19.00 EET	Šesták 62', 74'	Report	(yellow card) 83' Emre; 90+3' Niang	Stadium: Ankara 19 Mayıs Stadium; Referee: Kuddusi Müftüoğlu

18 December 2010 17	Fenerbahçe	1–0	Sivasspor	Istanbul
19.00 EET	Alex 77'	Report	(yellow card) 12' Bekmezci; (yellow card) 40' Nas; (yellow card) 90+1' Erdal	Stadium: Şükrü Saracoğlu Stadium; Referee: Yunus Yıldırım

22 January 2011 18	Antalyaspor	0–1	Fenerbahçe	Antalya
19.00 EET	Sekman (yellow card) 66'; Dağaşan (yellow card) 67'	Report	41' Gönül; (yellow card) 76' Lugano; (yellow card) 90' Hurmacı	Stadium: Antalya Atatürk Stadium; Referee: Tolga Özkalfa

30 January 2011 19	Fenerbahçe	2–0	Trabzonspor	Istanbul
19.00 EET	Lugano 19' (yellow card) 41'; Niang 23'; Gönül (yellow card) 43'; Selçuk (yellow card) 49' (yellow-red card) 65'; Emre (yellow card) 67'; Volkan (yellow card) 76'	Report	(yellow card) 17' Colman; (yellow card) 56' Burak; (yellow card) 68' Jaja; (yellow card) 68' (yellow-red card) 70' Głowacki; (yellow card) 90' Čale; (red card) 90' Cora	Stadium: Şükrü Saracoğlu Stadium; Referee: Bünyamin Gezer

5 February 2011 20	Manisaspor	1–3	Fenerbahçe	Manisa
19.00 EET	Kahê 54'; Simpson (yellow card) 55'; Dixon (yellow card) 75'	Report	(yellow card) 42' Lugano; 61' (pen.) Alex; 73' Niang; (yellow card) 84' Bekir; 89' Dia	Stadium: Manisa 19 Mayıs Stadium; Referee: Kuddusi Müftüoğlu

14 February 2011 21	Fenerbahçe	2–0	Kayserispor	Istanbul
20.00 EET	Niang 3'; Santos (yellow card) 58'; Lugano 60'; Bekir (yellow card) 89'	Report	(yellow card) 2' Kesimal; (yellow card) 53' Çakır; (yellow card) 85' Aydilek	Stadium: Şükrü Saracoğlu Stadium; Referee: Fırat Aydınus

20 February 2011 22	Beşiktaş	2–4	Fenerbahçe	Istanbul
19.00 EET	Ekrem (yellow card) 12' (goal) 44'; Quaresma (yellow card) 30'; Toraman 50'; Ferrari (red card) 63'; Rüştü (yellow card) 63'; Uysal (yellow card) 67'	Report	5' (o.g.) Uysal; (yellow card) 18' Santos; (yellow card) 60' Gönül; 65' (pen.), 72', 75' Alex; (yellow card) 84' Bekir; (yellow card) 87' Topuz	Stadium: Fiyapı İnönü Stadium; Referee: Cüneyt Çakır

26 February 2011 23	Fenerbahçe	2–0	Kasımpaşa	Istanbul
19.00 EET	Alex 32'; Yobo (yellow card) 43'; Dia 55'	Report	(yellow card) 34' Kaplan	Stadium: Şükrü Saracoğlu Stadium; Referee: Halis Özkahya

7 March 2011 24	Gençlerbirliği	2–4	Fenerbahçe	Ankara
20.00 EET	Serdar (yellow card) 20'; Orhan 24'; Hurşut 44'	Report	14' (yellow card) 90' Lugano; 21' (pen.) Alex; 63' Niang; 68' (yellow card) 78' Santos; (yellow card) 70' Cristian	Stadium: Ankara 19 Mayıs Stadium; Referee: Özgür Yankaya

13 March 2011 25	Fenerbahçe	2–0	Konyaspor	Istanbul
19.00 EET	Bekir (yellow card) 11'; Niang 15'; Yobo (yellow card) 33'; Emre (yellow card) 42'; Semih 77'	Report	(yellow card) 37' Zayatte; (yellow card) 48' Robak	Stadium: Şükrü Saracoğlu Stadium; Referee: Bülent Yıldırım

18 March 2011 26	Galatasaray	1–2	Fenerbahçe	Istanbul
21.00 EET	Kazım 14' (yellow card) 15'; Servet (yellow card) 30'; Zan (yellow card) 31'; Baroš (yellow card) 70'; Culio (yellow card) 71'	Report	(yellow card) 28' Selçuk; (yellow card) 43' Özer; 75' Semih; 87' Alex	Stadium: Türk Telekom Arena; Referee: Fırat Aydınus

3 April 2011 27	Fenerbahçe	0–0	Bursaspor	Istanbul
19.00 EET	Santos (yellow card) 56'	Report	(yellow card) 42' Şen; (yellow card) 50' İpek; (yellow card) 62' Tandoğan; (yellow card) 72' Öztürk	Stadium: Şükrü Saracoğlu Stadium; Attendance: 1240541; Referee: Kuddusi Müftüoğlu

9 April 2011 28	Eskişehirspor	1–3	Fenerbahçe	Eskişehir
19.00 EET	Karadeniz 8'; Zengin (yellow card) 30'; Coşkun (yellow card) 31'; Sarı (yellow card) 75'	Report	10' Erkin; 14' (yellow card) 38' Niang; (yellow card) 65' Gönül; (yellow card) 72' Lugano; 87' Semih	Stadium: Eskişehir Atatürk Stadyumu; Referee: Cüneyt Çakır

16 April 2011 29	Fenerbahçe	1–0	Gaziantepspor	Istanbul
19.00 EET	Emre (yellow card) 12'; Niang (yellow card) 21'; Lugano (yellow card) 44'; Semih (yellow card) 77'; Santos 90+4'	Report	(yellow card) 13' Dany; (yellow card) 36' Popov; (yellow card) 40' Güçer; (yellow card) 44' Güngör; (yellow card) 44' (yellow-red card) 84' Ceylan; (yellow card) 68' Sosa; (yellow card) 69' Wagner; (yellow card) 77' Şenol Can; (yellow card) 89' Zurita; (yellow card) 90' Elyasa	Stadium: Şükrü Saracoğlu Stadium; Referee: Hüseyin Göçek

24 April 2011 30	Bucaspor	3–5	Fenerbahçe	İzmir
19.00 EET	Musa 15'; Leko (yellow card) 18'; Onur (yellow card) 18'; Abdülkadir 38', 53' (yellow card) 38'; Ediz (yellow card) 58'; Erkan (yellow card) 78'	Report	17' Emre; (yellow card) 40' Gönül; 59' (pen.), 62' Alex; (yellow card) 65' Stoch; 71' Güiza; (yellow card) 68' Özer; (yellow card) 88' Yobo; 90' Santos	Stadium: İzmir Atatürk Stadium; Referee: Bünyamin Gezer

1 May 2011 31	Fenerbahçe	2–0	Istanbul B.B.	Istanbul
19.00 EET	Stoch 2'; Alex 45'	Report	(yellow card) 81' Ekrem	Stadium: Şükrü Saracoğlu Stadium; Referee: Fırat Aydınus

8 May 2011 32	Karabükspor	0–1	Fenerbahçe	Karabük
20.00 EET	Muhammet (yellow card) 52'; Cernat (yellow card) 75'	Report	(yellow card) 19' Stoch; 67' Lugano	Stadium: Dr. Necmettin Şeyhoğlu Stadium; Referee: Bülent Yıldırım

15 May 2011 33	Fenerbahçe	6–0	MKE Ankaragücü	Istanbul
20.00 EET	Alex 26' (pen.), 29' (pen.), 48' (pen.), 83', 89'; Topuz (yellow card) 46'; Bekir 73'	Report	(yellow card) 6' Kağan; (red card) 28' Senecký; (yellow card) 47' Özden; (yellow card) 81' Toscalı	Stadium: Şükrü Saracoğlu Stadium; Referee: Çüneyt Çakır

22 May 2011 34	Sivasspor	3–4	Fenerbahçe	Sivas
20.00 EET	Navratil 20'; E. Kılıç 65', 90'; A. Dereli (yellow card) 75'	Report	6' Santos; 41' (yellow card) 81' Selçuk; 51' Alex; 67' Yobo	Stadium: Sivas 4 Eylül Stadium; Referee: Fırat Aydınus

=== Türkiye Kupası ===
==== Group C ====
Pos	Team	Pld	W	D	L	GF	GA	GD	Pts
1	Gençlerbirliği	4	2	1	1	6	4	+2	7
2	Bucaspor	4	2	1	1	7	6	+1	7
3	Ankaragücü	4	1	3	0	6	4	+2	6
4	Yeni Malatyaspor	4	1	1	2	3	5	−2	4
5	Fenerbahçe	4	1	0	3	7	10	−3	3

Source: tff.org (in Turkish)
Rules for classification: 1) points; 2) goal difference; 3) number of goals scored.

Win Draw Loss Postponed

9 November 2010 1	Ankaragücü	4–2	Fenerbahçe	Ankara
20.00 EET	Rajnoch 48'; Sapara (yellow card) 53'; Weeks (yellow card) 69'; Uçar (yellow card) 74'; Šesták 77'; Snecký (yellow card) 81'; G. Gönül 85' (o.g.); Kağan 90'	Report	12' (yellow card) 70' Semih; (yellow card) 53' Caner; (yellow card) 83' G. Gönül; 90' Santos	Stadium: Ankara 19 Mayıs Stadium; Referee: Barış Şimşek

22 December 2010 2	Fenerbahçe	2–3	Bucaspor	Istanbul
20.15 EET	Semih 15'; Lugano (yellow card) 33'; Lugano 48'; Iravul (yellow card) 58'	Report	10' Musa; 43' Kaya; 65' Manucho; (yellow card) 90' Taşkıran	Stadium: Şükrü Saracoğlu Stadium; Referee: Özgür Yankaya

13 January 2011 3	Yeni Malatyaspor	2–1	Fenerbahçe	Malatya
20.00 EET	Alkan 24' (o.g.); Çalışal 43'	Report	25' Lugano; (yellow card) 90' Niang	Stadium: Malatya İnönü Stadium; Referee: İlker Coşkun

27 January 2011 4	Fenerbahçe	2–0	Gençlerbirliği	Istanbul
20.00 EET	Semih 10', 20'; Bilica (yellow card) 15'; Bekir (yellow card) 34'; Caner (yellow card) 25' (yellow-red card) 56'	Report	Çalık (yellow card) 18' (goal) 60'	Stadium: Şükrü Saracoğlu Stadium; Referee: Deniz Çoban

=== UEFA Champions League ===
==== Third Qualifying Round ====
Win Draw Loss Postponed

28 July 2010 First leg	Young Boys (Switzerland)	2–2	(Turkey) Fenerbahçe	Bern, Switzerland
	Dudar 17'; Costanzo (yellow card) 74' (goal) 89' (pen.)	Report	4' Emre; (yellow card) 25' (yellow-red card) 43' Kazim-Richards; 41' Stoch; (yellow card) 53' Turacı; (yellow card) 72' Alex; (yellow card) 87' Bilica	Stadium: Stade de Suisse; Attendance: 19,091; Referee: Svein Oddvar Moen (Norway)

4 August 2010 Second leg	Fenerbahçe (Turkey)	0–1 (2–3 agg.)	(Switzerland) Young Boys	Istanbul, Turkey
	Bekir (yellow card) 18'; Stoch (yellow card) 37' (yellow-red card) 53'; Bilica (yellow card) 77'; Emre (yellow card) 88'	Report	(yellow card) 23' Jemal; 40' Bienvenu; (yellow card) 57' Affolter; (yellow card) 72' Hoschstrasser; (yellow card) 86' Degen	Stadium: Şükrü Saracoğlu Stadium; Attendance: 35,260; Referee: Aleksei Nikolaev (Russia)

=== UEFA Europa League ===
==== Play-off Round ====
Win Draw Loss Postponed

19 August 2010 First leg	PAOK (Greece)	1–0	(Turkey) Fenerbahçe	Thessaloniki, Greece
	Vieirinha 19'; Vitolo (yellow card) 50' (yellow-red card) 57'; Ivić (yellow card) 73'	Report	(yellow card) 5' Caner; (yellow card) 27' Semih; (yellow card) 44' Lugano; (yellow card) 74' Santos	Stadium: Toumba Stadium; Attendance: 28000; Referee: Manuel Gräfe (Germany)

26 August 2010 Second leg	Fenerbahçe (Turkey)	1–1 (1–2 agg.)	(Greece) PAOK	Istanbul, Turkey
	Emre 49'; Topuz (yellow card) 55'; Lugano (yellow card) 113'	Report	(yellow card) 6' Boussaidi; (yellow card) 67' Malezas; (yellow card) 87' García; 102' Muslimović	Stadium: Şükrü Saracoğlu Stadium; Referee: Paolo Tagliavento (Italy)

== See also ==
- 2010–11 Süper Lig
- 2010–11 Türkiye Kupası
- 2010–11 UEFA Champions League
- 2010–11 UEFA Europa League
