= 2011–12 Fenerbahçe S.K. season =

Fenerbahçe
2011–12 season
- President: Aziz Yıldırım
- Head coach: Aykut Kocaman
- Stadium: Şükrü Saracoğlu Stadium
- Süper Lig: 2nd
- Süper Final: 2nd
- Turkish Cup: Winners
- Top goalscorer: League: Alex (14); All: Alex (17)
Home colours	Away colours	Third colours

The 2011–12 season was Fenerbahçe's 54th consecutive season in the Süper Lig and their 105th year in existence.

However, on 24 August 2011, the Turkish Football Federation (TFF), under pressure from UEFA in connection with a match-fixing investigation, banned Fenerbahçe from participating in the 2011–12 UEFA Champions League.

== Match fixing scandal ==
In July 2011, as part of a major match-fixing investigation by authorities in Turkey, nearly 60 people suspected to be involved with fixing games were detained by İstanbul Police Department Organized Crime Control Bureau and then arrested by the court. The Turkish football corruption scandal is an ongoing investigation about match-fixing, bribery, starting a gang, organized crime and intimidation in Turkey's top two divisions, the Süper Lig and the First League. On 10 July 2011, the club president Aziz Yıldırım was remanded in custody over allegations of match-fixing. On 19 July 2011, the TFF announced that the Turkish Super Cup game between Süper Lig champion Fenerbahçe and Turkish Cup winner Beşiktaş was postponed to an unknown date due to prosecution investigation. On 21 July 2011, at the Fenerbahçe-Shakhtar friendly game in Istanbul, Fenerbahçe fans with the full support of Fenerbahçe officials ripped out the seats and threw them onto the Turkish press. Police struggled to gain control for about 40–45 minutes and some cameramen, security officers and Ukrainian press were seriously wounded. Fenerbahçe fans invaded the pitch and threw flares towards security and protested both UEFA and FIFA, yelling that "you cannot relegate Fenerbahçe even if they did match-fixing". After that, the match was cancelled by the referee. According to Turkish Law number 6222 regarding "violence in sports", Article 16: invading the pitch, dressing room or/and corridor will be sentenced to 3 months-1 year in jail. If it seriously collapses the match security, then one will be sentenced to 1–3 years in jail. Article 17: Harming someone on the pitch or/and harming something in the stadium will be punished by Turkish Penal Code.

On 25 July 2011, TFF announced that the Süper Lig was delayed to 9 September 2011 and the TFF First League was postponed to 10 September 2011 due to prosecution investigation. On 28 July, Fenerbahçe declared that Emmanuel Emenike who joined the team 2 months ago from Karabükspor and involved in police investigation of the match-fixing scandal was on the list of transfers due to the possibility of relegation of Fenerbahçe. On the same day, four Fenerbahçe supporters were detained, with four more wanted. After four hours of declaration of Fenerbahçe, Fenerbahçe announced that Emmanuel Emenike was sold to Spartak Moscow.

On 29 July 2011, a third wave of investigation were started and Fenerbahçe official Murat Özaydınlı, Fenerbahçe Administrative Manager Hasan Çetinkaya, İBB Spor player and former Fenerbahçe player Can Arat and former referee and ex-Gençlerbirliği official Zafer Önder İpek were questioned.

On 2 August 2011, a fourth wave of investigation began and Fenerbahçe player Emre Belözoğlu, former Beşiktaş player and journalist Sinan Engin, Ankaragücü player Kaan Söylemezgiller, Manager Ekrem Okumuş and journalist Tahir Kum were questioned.

On 5 August 2011, UEFA Chief Executive Gianni Infantino said "In these uncertain times we must take care to protect our game. Threats from outside the game, including illegal betting and match-fixing, are a cause for real concern. We have seen major incidents in domestic leagues in Turkey, Greece and Italy, where matches remain under investigation. And UEFA is working hard behind the scenes to help rid the game of these threats. We are constantly monitoring all European domestic top league matches, as well as all UEFA matches, for any signs of unusual betting patterns, And to reiterate the warnings made earlier this season, I would like to remind you all that UEFA has a zero tolerance policy towards any involvement in illegal betting or irregular activities connected to our matches.Armed with new, tougher disciplinary regulations, we will not hesitate to investigate and prosecute any individual or any club that is caught. It is important that we face this threat to our game together and act quickly and decisively in order to deal with the issue."

On 15 August 2011, the TFF announced that they had deferred a decision on possible sanctions for the clubs implicated in a match-fixing scandal until a prosecutor's indictment into the case. However, TFF President said they had arrested 17 people, and 35 people who were under trial without arrest would be referred to the Professional Football Disciplinary Board in the scope of match fixing and incentive pay included in the investigation file. Trabzonspor and Galatasaray reacted to the declaration of TFF and made their statements.

On 17 August 2011, after the declaration of TFF on 15 August, Fenerbahçe gained 49 percent more value per unit share in the stock market. Capital Markets Board of Turkey (SPK) and Istanbul Stock Exchange (İMKB) immediately launched an investigation to see if there had been any manipulation or insider trading behind this unprecedented volatility in the shares. SPK and İMKB specialists were also in contact with İstanbul Prosecutor's office and İstanbul Police Department OCCB.

On 22 August 2011, it was the first time in history that UEFA had sent Chief Inspector of the UEFA Disciplinary Committee Pierre Cornu to meet the prosecutor directly to find out what happened in Turkey. Cornu met Mehmet Berk who is the prosecutor of match-fixing investigation at İstanbul Prosecutor's Office.

On 24 August 2011, the TFF, under pressure from UEFA in connection with the match-fixing investigation, banned Fenerbahçe from participating in the 2011–12 UEFA Champions League.

On the same day, UEFA announced that the Trabzonspor-Athletic Bilbao game was cancelled. UEFA decided to replace Fenerbahçe with Trabzonspor, runners-up in the 2010–11 Süper Lig. UEFA General Secretary Gianni Infantino said: "The panel considered that the Turkish Football Federation took the right decision to protect the game, fully in line with our zero-tolerance policy against match-fixing. The Turkish Football Federation has shown with this decision that it takes its full responsibility in the fight against corruption."

On 25 August 2011, Fenerbahçe Deputy President Nihat Özdemir resigned as deputy president and all other duties assigned, due to UEFA's 24 August 2011 statement. Fenerbahçe President Aziz Yıldırım, who is in jail, also resigned as president of the Süper Lig Teams Organization. The Arbitration Board of TFF rejected Fenerbahçe's appeal regarding admission to Champions League.

On 26 August 2011, UEFA President Michel Platini said "Match-fixing scandals have badly tarnished the game recently, with Turkish champions Fenerbahçe this week withdrawn from the Champions League amid investigations into allegations in that country. If you have match-fixing and the result of the game is known before it is played, what is the point of going to the match, or reporting it?"

On 6 September 2011, UEFA President Michel Platini said "Don't you really know why Fenerbahçe couldn't join the UEFA Champions League? The investigation is still going on. When it's completed, everybody knows everything in details. However, it is certain that it won't be good for Turkish football anymore."

On 9 September 2011, TFF President Mehmet Ali Aydınlar declared that they had changed their decision of 15 August 2011's statement and would make a decision regarding the previous season at the end of the 2011–12 season, whereas they already announced that they deferred a decision on possible sanctions for the clubs implicated in a match-fixing scandal until a prosecutor's indictment into the case.

On 26 September 2011, in Italy, Naples prosecutor Rosario Cantelmo announced that he had discovered illegal betting activities in the Fenerbahçe – MTK Budapest match on 30 July 2008.

On 25 January 2012, UEFA Chief Executive Gianni Infantino declared, "I think it is important that the TFF is taking decisions, the right decisions, with regards to this whole match-fixing situation. The disciplinary proceedings from the sporting side, they need to go fast, because it is important that the integrity and regularity of the competition is guaranteed as soon as possible."

On 26 January 2012, General Convention of TFF, which consists of Turkish clubs, rejected a federation proposal to spare clubs from possible relegation over a match-fixing scandal.

== Kits ==
Fenerbahçe's 2011–12 kits were introduced on 15 July 2011 on fenerbahce.org and produced by Adidas. The home kit's name is Çubuklu Forma, which means "Striped Kit"; the away kit's name is Tek Yıldız Forma, which means "One-Star Kit"; the third kit's name is Altın Zırh Forma, which means "Golden Armor Kit"; and the fourth kit's name is Sarı Kanarya Forma, which means "Yellow Canary Kit".

- Supplier: Adidas
- Main sponsor: Avea
- Back sponsor: Ülker
- Sleeve sponsor: Türk Telekom
- Short sponsor:
- Socks sponsor:

Home
Away
Third
Fourth
Goalkeeper 1º
Goalkeeper 2º
Goalkeeper 3º
Goalkeeper 4º

== Transfers ==
=== In ===
No.	Pos.	Nat.	Name	Age	Moving from	Type	Transfer window	Ends	Transfer fee	Source
19	FW	(Nigeria)	Emmanuel Emenike	24	Kardemir Karabükspor	Transfer	Summer	2015	€9M	Fenerbahce.org
67	DF	(Turkey)	Orhan Şam	24	Gençlerbirliği	Transfer	Summer	2015	€3.5M	Fenerbahce.org
53	DF	(Turkey)	Serdar Kesimal	22	Kayserispor	Transfer	Summer	2016	€4M	Fenerbahce.org
8	MF	(Turkey)	Sezer Öztürk	25	Eskişehirspor	Transfer	Summer	2016	€2.75M	Fenerbahce.org
3	DF	(Switzerland)	Reto Ziegler	25	Juventus (Italy)	Loan	Summer	2012	€0.6M	Fenerbahce.org
6	DF	(Nigeria)	Joseph Yobo	30	Everton (England)	Loan	Summer	2012	€0.7M	Fenerbahce.org
15	FW	(Cameroon)	Henri Bienvenu	23	Young Boys (Switzerland)	Transfer	Summer	2015	€4M	Fenerbahce.org
60	MF	(Turkey)	Özgür Çek	21	Ankaragücü	Transfer	Winter	2015	Free	Fenerbahce.org
7	FW	(Senegal)	Moussa Sow	26	Lille (France)	Transfer	Winter	2016	€10M	Fenerbahce.org

Total spending: ▼€34.55 million

=== Out ===
No.	Pos.	Nat.	Name	Age	Moving to	Type	Transfer window	Transfer fee	Source
17	DF	(Turkey)	Okan Alkan	18	Kayserispor	Loan	Summer	Free	Kayserispor.org.tr
6	DF	(Turkey)	İlhan Eker	28	Kayserispor	Released	Summer	Free	Kayserispor.org.tr
18	MF	(Turkey)	Abdülkadir Kayalı	20	Eskişehirspor	Released	Summer	Free	Eskisehirspor.org.tr
15	GK	(Turkey)	Volkan Babacan	22	Manisaspor	Loan	Summer	Free	Manisaspor.org.tr
19	FW	(Nigeria)	Emmanuel Emenike	24	Spartak Moscow (Russia)	Sell	Summer	€10M	Spartak.com
9	FW	(Spain)	Dani Güiza	31	Getafe (Spain)	Sell	Summer	undisclosed	Getafecf.com
2	DF	(Uruguay)	Diego Lugano	30	Paris Saint-Germain (France)	Sell	Summer	€3M	Psg.fr
27	DF	(Brazil)	André Santos	28	Arsenal (England)	Sell	Summer	€7M	Arsenal.com
7	FW	(Senegal)	Mamadou Niang	31	Al Sadd (Qatar)	Sell	Summer	€7.5M	Al-saddclub.net
25	MF	(Turkey)	Uğur Boral	29	Samsunspor	Sell	Winter	Free	Samsunspor.org.tr
99	FW	(Turkey)	Recep Berk Elitez	19	Kayseri Erciyesspor	Loan	Winter	Free	Erciyesspor.org.tr

Total income: ▲€27.5 million

== Line-up ==
No.	Pos.	Nat.	Name	MS	Notes
1	GK	(Turkey)	Volkan Demirel	39	Mert Günok has 6 starts
77	RB	(Turkey)	Gökhan Gönül	33	Orhan Şam has 10 starts
53	CB	(Turkey)	Serdar Kesimal	14	Bekir İrtegün has 18 starts, Bilica has 12 starts
6	CB	(Nigeria)	Joseph Yobo	42	
3	LB	(Switzerland)	Reto Ziegler	41	Çek has 1 start
16	CM	(Brazil)	Cristian	41	Sezer Öztürk has 1 start
5	CM	(Turkey)	Emre Belözoğlu	26	Gökay Iravul has 2 starts, Selçuk Şahin has 19 starts
10	AM	(Brazil)	Alex	33	Özer Hurmacı has 11 starts
38	RW	(Turkey)	Mehmet Topuz	32	Issiar Dia has 9 starts
9	LW	(Slovakia)	Miroslav Stoch	28	Caner Erkin has 26 starts
7	CF	(Senegal)	Moussa Sow	12	Henri Bienvenu has 16 starts, Semih Şentürk has 15 starts

4–2–3–1 Formation

== First-team squad ==
Note: Flags indicate national team as defined under FIFA eligibility rules; some limited exceptions apply. Players may hold more than one non-FIFA nationality.

No.	Pos.	Nation	Player
1	GK	TUR	Volkan Demirel
3	DF	SUI	Reto Ziegler
4	DF	TUR	Bekir İrtegün
6	DF	NGA	Joseph Yobo
7	FW	SEN	Moussa Sow
8	MF	TUR	Sezer Öztürk
9	MF	SVK	Miroslav Stoch
10	MF	BRA	Alex
14	MF	TUR	Gökay Iravul
15	FW	CMR	Henri Bienvenu
16	MF	BRA	Cristian
20	MF	TUR	Özer Hurmacı

No.	Pos.	Nation	Player
23	FW	TUR	Semih Şentürk
34	GK	TUR	Mert Günok
38	MF	TUR	Mehmet Topuz
53	DF	TUR	Serdar Kesimal
58	DF	BRA	Bilica
60	MF	TUR	Özgür Çek
62	MF	TUR	Selçuk Şahin
67	DF	TUR	Orhan Şam
77	DF	TUR	Gökhan Gönül
85	GK	TUR	Serkan Kırıntılı
88	DF	TUR	Caner Erkin
92	MF	SEN	Issiar Dia
95	FW	TUR	Recep Niyaz

=== Out on Loan ===
Note: Flags indicate national team as defined under FIFA eligibility rules; some limited exceptions apply. Players may hold more than one non-FIFA nationality.

No.	Pos.	Nation	Player
—	DF	TUR	Okan Alkan (at Kayserispor until 30 June 2012–13)
—	GK	TUR	Volkan Babacan (at Manisaspor until June 2011–12)
—	GK	TUR	Ertuğrul Taşkıran (at Samsunspor until June 2011–12)
—	DF	TUR	Hasan Erbey (at Konya Şekerspor until June 2011–12)

No.	Pos.	Nation	Player
—	FW	TUR	Furkan Aydın (at Bozüyükspor until June 2011–12)
—	MF	TUR	Onur Karakabak (at Manisaspor until June 2011–12)
—	FW	TUR	Recep Berk Elitez (at Kayseri Erciyesspor until June 2011–12)

== Squad statistics ==
No.	Pos.	Player	League		Cup		Total		Discipline	
No.	Pos.	Player	Apps.	Goal	Apps.	Goal	Apps.	Goal	Yellow card	Red card
1	GK	(Turkey) Volkan Demirel	38	0	1	0	39	0	6	0
3	DF	(Switzerland) Reto Ziegler	38	1	4	0	42	1	8	0
4	DF	(Turkey) Bekir İrtegün	23	0	3	0	26	0	6	0
5	MF	(Turkey) Emre Belözoğlu	27	6	2	0	29	6	11	0
6	DF	(Nigeria) Joseph Yobo	39	1	3	0	42	1	5	0
7	FW	(Senegal) Moussa Sow	12	7	2	1	14	8	2	0
8	DF	(Turkey) Sezer Öztürk	5	0	0	0	5	0	1	0
9	FW	(Slovakia) Miroslav Stoch	33	12	4	0	37	12	3	0
10	MF	(Brazil) Alex	33	14	4	3	36	17	6	1
14	MF	(Turkey) Gökay Iravul	3	0	1	0	4	0	0	0
15	FW	(Cameroon) Henri Bienvenu	36	8	3	4	39	12	0	0
16	MF	(Brazil) Cristian	38	8	5	2	43	10	8	0
20	MF	(Turkey) Özer Hurmacı	18	1	4	0	22	1	3	0
22	GK	(Turkey) Ertuğrul Taşkıran	0	0	0	0	0	0	0	0
23	FW	(Turkey) Semih Şentürk	22	1	3	2	25	3	3	0
34	GK	(Turkey) Mert Günok	2	0	4	0	6	0	0	0
35	DF	(Turkey) Hasan Erbey	0	0	0	0	0	0	0	0
38	MF	(Turkey) Mehmet Topuz	33	3	4	0	37	3	3	0
53	DF	(Turkey) Serdar Kesimal	12	0	3	0	15	0	6	0
58	DF	(Brazil) Bilica	10	0	2	0	12	0	2	0
60	MF	(Turkey) Özgür Çek	4	0	3	0	7	0	0	0
62	MF	(Turkey) Selçuk Şahin	28	0	2	1	30	1	5	0
67	DF	(Turkey) Orhan Şam	15	0	4	0	19	0	3	0
77	DF	(Turkey) Gökhan Gönül	30	1	2	0	32	1	5	0
85	GK	(Turkey) Serkan Kırıntılı	0	0	0	0	0	0	0	0
88	MF	(Turkey) Caner Erkin	31	2	5	1	36	3	8	1
92	FW	(Senegal) Issiar Dia	16	3	3	1	19	4	2	1
95	FW	(Turkey) Recep Niyaz	3	0	0	0	3	0	0	0
Players sold or loaned out after the start of the season
99	FW	(Turkey) Recep Berk Elitez	0	0	0	0	1	0	0	0
25	MF	(Turkey) Uğur Boral	3	0	0	0	3	0	1	0
Last updated: 16 May 2012

== Club ==
=== The Board of Directors ===
President	(Turkey) Aziz Yıldırım
Deputy-president/Press Spokesman	(Turkey) Nihat Özdemir
Secretary general	(Turkey) Vedat Olcay
Vice-president/Member	(Turkey) Ali Koç
Vice-president, Financial and Project	(Turkey) Nihat Özbağı
Member	(Turkey) Alaeddin Yıldırım
Vice-president/Member	(Turkey) Murat Özaydınlı
Vice-president, Social Organisations & Associations	(Turkey) Mithat Yenigün
Vice-president, Amateur Departments	(Turkey) Mahmut Nedim Uslu
Vice-president, Formal Association Relations	(Turkey) Serhat Çeçen
Vice-president, Law & Institutional Relations	(Turkey) Şekip Mosturoğlu
Football and Stadium Infrastructure	(Turkey) Ömer Temelli
Social Organisations	(Turkey) Ünal Uzun
Fenerbahçe Training Company	(Turkey) Turan Şahin

Source: Board of Directors

=== Technical staff ===
Position	Staff
Head Coach	(Turkey) Aykut Kocaman
Coach	(Turkey) İsmail Kartal
Assistant Coach	(Bosnia and Herzegovina) Fahrudin Omerovic
Goalkeeping Coach	(Turkey) Murat Öztürk

Source: Fenerbahce.org

=== Medical staff ===
Position	Staff
Doctor	(Turkey) Ertuğrul Karanlık
Physiotherapist	(Turkey) Orhan Şakir
Masseur	(Turkey) Özkan Alaca
Fitness Coach	(Turkey) Alper Asçı

Source: Fenerbahce.org

== Pre-season friendlies ==
Win Draw Loss Postponed

14 July 2011 Brussels T.	Fenerbahçe (Turkey)	3–4	(Netherlands) Twente	Tubize
	Şentürk 43', 71', 80'	Report	Tiendalli 3'; Berghuis 15'; De Jong 19', 37'	Stadium: Stade Leburton

16 July 2011 Brussels T.	Fenerbahçe (Turkey)	3–1	(Belgium) Standard Liège	Tubize
	Güiza 1'; Cristian 21'; Şentürk 90'	Report	Mangala 6'	Stadium: Stade Leburton

21 July 2011 Friendly	Fenerbahçe (Turkey)	0–0	(Ukraine) Shakhtar Donetsk	Istanbul
		Report		Stadium: Şükrü Saracoğlu Stadium
Note: Postponed due to fans on 68 minute stormed the pitch, enraged over match-fixing charges

24 July 2011 Friendly	Sakaryaspor (Turkey)	0–3	(Turkey) Fenerbahçe	Adapazarı
		Report	Şentürk 26'; Stoch 64'; Boral 78'	Stadium: Sakarya Atatürk Stadium

15 August 2011 Friendly	1. FC Nürnberg (Germany)	1–2	(Turkey) Fenerbahçe	Nuremberg
	Bunjaku 68'	Report	Niang 15', 34'	Stadium: Frankenstadion

21 August 2011 Friendly	Palermo (Italy)	2–3	(Turkey) Fenerbahçe	Palermo
	Zahavi 16'; Hernández 45' (pen.)	Report	Cristian 36'; Kesimal 39'; Boral 77'	Stadium: Stadio Renzo Barbera

23 August 2011 Friendly	Werder Bremen (Germany)	0–1	(Turkey) Fenerbahçe	Osnabrück
		Report	Hurmacı 77'	Stadium: Osnatel-Arena

8 October 2011 Friendly	Fenerbahçe (Turkey)	5–1	(Turkey) Kartalspor	Istanbul
	Şentürk 40'; Erkin 67'; Alex 77'; Dia 79'; Bienvenu 85'	Report	Deyvison 3'	Stadium: Can Bartu Training Facilities

Source: Competitive Matches

== Competitions ==
=== Overall ===
Competition	Started round	Current position / round	Final position / round	First match	Last match
Süper Lig	—	2nd	2nd	12 September 2011	12 May 2012
Türkiye Kupası	—	—	Winners	10 January 2012	16 May 2012

Source: Competitions

=== Süper Kupa ===
Win Draw Loss Postponed

TBA Süper Kupa	Fenerbahçe	v	Beşiktaş	Erzurum
		Report		Stadium: Erzurum Universiade Arena
Note: The match was to be played on 31 July 2011 but the TFF postponed the game due to match fixing scandal investigations. The venue for the final will be Erzurum Universiade Arena hosting its first Turkish Super Cup final.

Source: Competitive Matches

=== Süper Lig ===
==== League table ====
Pos	Team	Pld	W	D	L	GF	GA	GD	Pts	Qualification or relegation
1	Galatasaray	34	23	8	3	69	24	+45	77	Qualification to Süper Final, Championship group
2	Fenerbahçe	34	20	8	6	61	34	+27	68	Qualification to Süper Final, Championship group
3	Trabzonspor	34	15	11	8	60	39	+21	56	Qualification to Süper Final, Championship group
4	Beşiktaş	34	15	10	9	50	39	+11	55	Qualification to Süper Final, Championship group
5	Eskişehirspor	34	14	8	12	42	41	+1	50 (Note: Eskişehirspor were ahead of İstanbul B.B. and Sivasspor on head-to-head points: Eskişehirspor: 8 pts, İstanbul B.B.: 5 pts, Sivasspor: 2 pts.)	Qualification to Süper Final, Europa League group

Source: TFF's official Süper Lig website
Rules for classification: 1) points; 2) goal difference; 3) number of goals scored.

==== Results summary ====
Overall								Home						Away					
Pld	W	D	L	GF	GA	GD	Pts	W	D	L	GF	GA	GD	W	D	L	GF	GA	GD
34	20	8	6	61	34	+27	68	14	3	0	39	12	+27	6	5	6	22	22	0

Source: Competitive Matches

==== Results by round ====
Round	1	2	3	4	5	6	7	8	9	10	11	12	13	14	15	16	17	18	19	20	21	22	23	24	25	26	27	28	29	30	31	32	33	34
Ground	H	A	H	A	H	A	H	A	H	A	H	A	H	A	A	H	A	A	H	A	H	A	H	A	H	A	H	A	H	A	H	H	A	H
Result	W	W	D	W	W	W	D	D	W	L	W	D	W	L	W	W	D	D	W	W	W	L	W	L	W	L	W	L	W	W	D	W	D	W
Position	8	3	2	2	1	1	1	1	1	1	1	1	1	2	2	2	2	2	2	2	2	2	2	2	2	2	2	2	2	2	2	2	2	2

Source: Competitive Matches
A = Away; H = Home; W = Win; D = Draw; L = Loss

==== Matches ====
Win Draw Loss Postponed

12 September 2011 1	Fenerbahçe	1–0	Orduspor	Istanbul
20:00 EET	Cristian 24'; Ziegler (yellow card) 56'; Bilica (yellow card) 81'	Report	Dalmat (yellow card) 56'; Bayrak (yellow card) 63'	Stadium: Şükrü Saracoğlu Stadium; Attendance: 0 Referee: Yunus Yıldırım

16 September 2011 2	Gaziantepspor	1–3	Fenerbahçe	Gaziantep
20:00 EET	Adın 28'; Nounkeu (yellow card) 72'; Kurtuluş (yellow card) 75'	Report	Alex (yellow card) 25', (goal) 35', 54'; Şentürk (yellow card) 32'; Boral (yellow card) 52'; Bienvenu 81'; Öztürk (yellow card) 82'	Stadium: Kamil Ocak Stadium; Attendance: n/a Referee: Bülent Yıldırım

20 September 2011 3	Fenerbahçe	1–1	Manisaspor	Istanbul
20:00 EET	Dia 41'; İrtegün (yellow card) 51'	Report	Çalışkan (yellow card) 39' (yellow-red card) 49'; Bilica 66' (o.g.); Gökoğlan (yellow card) 90'	Stadium: Şükrü Saracoğlu Stadium; Attendance: 41,663; Referee: Özgür Yankaya

23 September 2011 4	Kayserispor	0–1	Fenerbahçe	Kayseri
20:00 EET	Güngör (yellow card) 41'; Khizanishvili (yellow card) 54'; Santana (yellow card) 60'	Report	Erkin 6'; Şam (yellow card) 56'; Demirel (yellow card) 88'	Stadium: Kadir Has Stadium; Attendance: n/a Referee: Kuddusi Müftüoğlu

1 October 2011 5	Fenerbahçe	4–2	İstanbul BB	Istanbul
19:00 EET	Şam (yellow card) 9'; Stoch 47', (yellow card) 48'; Alex 58'; Gönül (yellow card) 61', (goal) 69'; Cristian 90'	Report	Doka Madureira (yellow card) 36'; Webó 79', 85', (yellow card) 89'; Arat (yellow card) 88'; Tekdemir (yellow card) 90'	Stadium: Şükrü Saracoğlu Stadium; Attendance: n/a Referee: Cüneyt Çakır

17 October 2011 6	Mersin İdman Yurdu	1–2	Fenerbahçe	Mersin
20:00 EET	Ben Yahia (yellow card) 39'; Moritz (yellow card) 42'; Zurita (yellow card) 57'; Kaş (yellow card) 53' (yellow-red card) 55'; Beto 90+1'	Report	Hurmacı 4'; Bienvenu 53'; Ziegler (yellow card) 69'	Stadium: Tevfik Sırrı Gür Stadium; Attendance: n/a Referee: Halis Özkahya

23 October 2011 7	Fenerbahçe	0–0	Samsunspor	Istanbul
20:00 EET	İrtegün (yellow card) 28'	Report	Domínguez (yellow card) 25'; Alkaşi (yellow card) 77'	Stadium: Şükrü Saracoğlu Stadium; Attendance: n/a Referee: İlker Meral

27 October 2011 8	Beşiktaş	2–2	Fenerbahçe	Istanbul
20:30 EET	Simão 12'; Quaresma (yellow card) 13'; Almeida 72'	Report	Topuz (yellow card) 24'; İrtegün (yellow card) 51'; Alex 60'; Cristian 82'	Stadium: Fiyapı İnönü Stadium; Attendance: n/a Referee: Fırat Aydınus

31 October 2011 9	Fenerbahçe	1–0	Kardemir Karabükspor	Istanbul
20:00 EET	Alex (red card) 6'; Demirel (yellow card) 6'; Bienvenu 17'; Gönül (yellow card) 52'; Belözoğlu (yellow card) 53'	Report	Kuçik (yellow card) 41'; Özgenç (yellow card) 45'; Nikolić (yellow card) 51'; Cebe (yellow card) 59'; Šerić (yellow card) 65'	Stadium: Şükrü Saracoğlu Stadium; Attendance: n/a Referee: Aytekin Durmaz

4 November 2011 10	Sivasspor	2–0	Fenerbahçe	Sivas
20:00 EET	Erdal (yellow card) 21'; Akça (yellow card) 34'; Eneramo 37'; Grosicki 72'	Report	Erkin (yellow card) 21'; Yobo (yellow card) 87'	Stadium: Sivas 4 Eylül Stadium; Attendance: n/a Referee: Cüneyt Çakır

19 November 2011 11	Fenerbahçe	1–0	Eskişehirspor	Istanbul
19:00 EET	Bienvenu 14'; İrtegün (yellow card) 54'; Belözoğlu (yellow card) 87'; Hurmacı (yellow card) 90+'	Report	Nadarević (red card) 18'; Sarı (yellow card) 50'	Stadium: Şükrü Saracoğlu Stadium; Attendance: n/a Referee: Tolga Özkalfa

25 November 2011 12	Gençlerbirliği	0–0	Fenerbahçe	Ankara
20:00 EET		Report	Bienvenu (yellow card) 60'	Stadium: Ankara 19 Mayıs Stadium; Attendance: n/a Referee: Halis Özkahya

3 December 2011 13	Fenerbahçe	4–2	Ankaragücü	Istanbul
19:00 EET	Stoch 18', 58'; Cristian 52'; Dia 88'	Report	Duruer 42'; Keleş 83'	Stadium: Şükrü Saracoğlu Stadium; Attendance: n/a Referee: İlker Meral

7 December 2011 14	Galatasaray	3–1	Fenerbahçe	Istanbul
19:30 EET	Eboué (yellow card) 3', (goal) 33'; Elmander 41'; Melo 66'	Report	Erkin (yellow card) 56'; Şahin (yellow card) 64'; Şentürk (yellow card) 74'; Alex 90+1'	Stadium: Türk Telekom Arena; Attendance: 50,152; Referee: Fırat Aydınus

12 December 2011 15	Bursaspor	0–2	Fenerbahçe	Bursa
20:00 EET	Öztürk (yellow card) 48'; Aziz (yellow card) 56'; Bangura (yellow card) 77'; N'Diaye (yellow card) 87'	Report	Şentürk 39'; Kesimal (yellow card) 53'; Ziegler (yellow card) 56'; Belözoğlu (yellow card) 79'; Stoch 84'	Stadium: Bursa Atatürk Stadium; Attendance: n/a Referee: Halis Ozkahya

18 December 2011 16	Fenerbahçe	1–0	Trabzonspor	Istanbul
20:00 EET	Topuz 24'; Gönül (yellow card) 25'; Kesimal (yellow card) 75'; Şahin (yellow card) 88'	Report	Colman (yellow card) 49'; Akgün (yellow card) 36' (yellow-red card) 55'; Zengin (yellow card) 84'; Kaçar (yellow card) 86'	Stadium: Şükrü Saracoğlu Stadium; Attendance: n/a Referee: Cüneyt Çakır

21 December 2011 17	Medical Park Antalyaspor	0–0	Fenerbahçe	Antalya
20:00 EET	Turan (yellow card) 75'; Şeras (yellow card) 90'	Report		Stadium: Mardan Sports Complex; Attendance: n/a Referee: Yunus Yıldırım

4 January 2012 18	Orduspor	1–1	Fenerbahçe	Ordu
20:00 EET	Stancu 18'; Culio (yellow card) 67'; Ayhan (yellow card) 88'	Report	Belözoğlu 50', (yellow card) 67'	Stadium: 19 Eylül Stadı; Attendance: n/a Referee: Tolga Özkalfa

9 January 2012 19	Fenerbahçe	3–1	Gaziantepspor	Istanbul
20:00 EET	Alex (yellow card) 44'; Cristian (yellow card) 45', (goal) 77'; Kesimal (yellow card) 56'; Stoch 76'; Topuz 90+2'	Report	Has 12'; Zengin (yellow card) 30' (yellow-red card) 45'; Süme (yellow card) 55'; Can (yellow card) 56'; Ivan (yellow card) 90'	Stadium: Şükrü Saracoğlu Stadium; Attendance: n/a Referee: Kamil Abitoğlu

16 January 2012 20	Manisaspor	1–2	Fenerbahçe	Manisa
20:00 EET	İncedemir (yellow card) 45'; Simpson 61'	Report	Cristian (yellow card) 52'; Erkin 55', (yellow card) 89'; İncedemir 90+5' (o.g.)	Stadium: Manisa 19 Mayis Stadium; Attendance: n/a Referee: Kuddusi Müftüoğlu

21 January 2012 21	Fenerbahçe	4–0	Kayserispor	Istanbul
19:00 EET	Alex 11', 67' (pen.); Topuz (yellow card) 43'; Stoch 77'; Bienvenu 90'	Report	Pekarík (yellow card) 59'; Ünal (yellow card) 79'; Riveros (yellow card) 83'	Stadium: Şükrü Saracoğlu Stadium; Attendance: n/a Referee: Bülent Yıldırım

25 January 2012 22	İstanbul BB	3–2	Fenerbahçe	Istanbul
18:00 EET	Holmén 3', 72', (yellow card) 32'; Tekdemir (yellow card) 18'; Kuś (yellow card) 31'; Ekşioğlu (yellow card) 37'; Webó 57'; Gülpınar (yellow card) 61'	Report	Bilica (yellow card) 35'; Belözoğlu (yellow card) 39', (goal) 52'; Alex 88'; Ziegler (yellow card) 90'; Yobo (yellow card) 90'	Stadium: Atatürk Olympic Stadium; Attendance: n/a Referee: Özgür Yankaya

29 January 2012 23	Fenerbahçe	2–1	Mersin İdman Yurdu	Istanbul
19:00 EET	Bienvenu 8'; Stoch 39'; Şam (yellow card) 77'	Report	Ozokwo (yellow card) 47', (goal) 57'; Atan (yellow card) 73'; Kılıçaslan (yellow card) 89'	Stadium: Şükrü Saracoğlu Stadium; Attendance: n/a Referee: Barış Şimşek

2 February 2012 24	Samsunspor	3–1	Fenerbahçe	Samsun
18:00 EET	Ceylan (yellow card) 7'; Tuncer (yellow card) 28'; Gekas 42' (pen.), 71', 75'; Özkan (yellow card) 84'	Report	Stoch 6'; Hurmacı (yellow card) 32'; Cristian (yellow card) 77'; Alex (yellow card) 90'	Stadium: Samsun 19 Mayıs Stadium; Attendance: n/a Referee: Mustafa Kamil Abitoğlu

5 February 2012 25	Fenerbahçe	2–0	Beşiktaş	Istanbul
19:00 EET	Yobo 14'; Belözoğlu (yellow card) 42'; Sow 90+2'	Report	Kavlak (yellow card) 42'; Toraman (yellow card) 60'; Kayhan (yellow card) 70'; Simão (yellow card) 90'	Stadium: Şükrü Saracoğlu Stadium; Attendance: n/a Referee: Özgür Yankaya

12 February 2012 26	Kardemir Karabükspor	2–1	Fenerbahçe	Karabük
18:00 EET	Mabiala (yellow card) 39'; Cernat 45'; Hikmet 45+1'; Jahić (yellow card) 68'; Özgenç (yellow card) 90'	Report	Alex 67', (penalty missed); Erkin (yellow card) 83'	Stadium: Dr. Necmettin Şeyhoğlu Stadium; Attendance: n/a Referee: Fırat Aydınus

18 February 2012 27	Fenerbahçe	4–2	Sivasspor	Istanbul
18:00 EET	Belözoğlu 4', 73'; İrtegün (yellow card) 55'; Alex 65', 67'	Report	Karakaş 16', (yellow card) 38'; Rajnoch (yellow card) 38'; Kılıç (yellow card) 51'; Eneramo (yellow card) 55'; Kavuk (yellow card) 69'	Stadium: Şükrü Saracoğlu Stadium; Attendance: 43,000; Referee: Bülent Yıldırım

25 February 2012 28	Eskişehirspor	2–1	Fenerbahçe	Eskişehir
18:00 EET	Ertuğrul 31'; Diego Ângelo (yellow card) 45'; Kamara 55'; Potuk (yellow card) 62'	Report	İrtegün (yellow card) 43'; Topuz (yellow card) 40'; Erkin (red card) 73'; Sow 75'; Ziegler (yellow card) 87'	Stadium: Eskişehir Atatürk Stadium; Attendance: n/a Referee: Halis Özkahya

3 March 2012 29	Fenerbahçe	6–1	Gençlerbirliği	Istanbul
18:00 EET	Stoch 2', 38'; Sow 20'; Kesimal (yellow card) 25'; Belözoğlu 56'; Ziegler (yellow card) 61'; Alex (yellow card) 62', (goal) 63'; Cristian (yellow card) 64'; Dia 68'	Report	Aydoğdu 60' (pen.)	Stadium: Şükrü Saracoğlu Stadium; Attendance: n/a Referee: Tolga Özkalfa

9 March 2012 30	Ankaragücü	0–2	Fenerbahçe	Ankara
20:00 EET	Doğan (yellow card) 81'	Report	Sow 15'; Topuz 70'	Stadium: Ankara 19 Mayıs Stadium; Attendance: n/a Referee: Barış Şimşek

17 March 2012 31	Fenerbahçe	2–2	Galatasaray	Istanbul
20:00 EET	Sow 10'; Alex 15'; Belözoğlu (yellow card) 44'; Kesimal (yellow card) 69'	Report	Elmander 36', (yellow card) 77'; Balta 83'	Stadium: Şükrü Saracoğlu Stadium; Attendance: 52,000; Referee: Bülent Yıldırım

24 March 2012 32	Fenerbahçe	1–0	Bursaspor	Istanbul
19:00 EET	Alex 40'	Report	Chrétien (yellow card) 41'	Stadium: Şükrü Saracoğlu Stadium; Attendance: 42,940; Referee: Özgür Yankaya

1 April 2012 33	Trabzonspor	1–1	Fenerbahçe	Trabzon
19:00 EET	Colman (yellow card) 65'; Yılmaz 73'	Report	Cristian 39', (yellow card) 80'; Erkin (yellow card) 40'; Demirel (yellow card) 64'; Stoch (yellow card) 67'; İrtegün (yellow card) 79'	Stadium: Hüseyin Avni Aker Stadium; Attendance: n/a Referee: Fırat Aydınus

7 April 2012 34	Fenerbahçe	2–0	Medical Park Antalyaspor	Istanbul
19:00 EET	Sow 62'; Belözoğlu (yellow card) 68'; Bienvenu 72'; Erkin (yellow card) 77'	Report	İnceman (yellow card) 81'; Turan (yellow card) 81'; Ağçay (yellow card) 84'	Stadium: Şükrü Saracoğlu Stadium; Attendance: n/a Referee: Tolga Özkalfa

Source: Competitive Matches

=== Süper Final ===
==== Final table ====
Pos	Team	Pld	W	D	L	GF	GA	GD	Pts	Qualification
1	Galatasaray (C)	6	2	3	1	9	6	+3	48	Qualification to Champions League group stage
2	Fenerbahçe	6	4	1	1	9	4	+5	47	Qualification to Champions League third qualifying round
3	Trabzonspor	6	1	2	3	5	10	−5	33	Qualification to Europa League play-off round (Note: Trabzonspor entered the play-off round as Fenerbahçe, the winners of the 2011–12 Turkish Cup, already qualified for the Champions League. Moreover, as Beşiktaş is banned 1 year from European football, Europa League spots shifted down, so Bursaspor start from the third qualifying round, as well as Eskişehirspor start from the second qualifying round.)
4	Beşiktaş	6	1	2	3	5	8	−3	33	Banned from 2012–13 European competitions (Note: See 2012–13 UEFA Europa League qualification play-off match. Moreover, as Beşiktaş is banned 1 year from European football, Europa League spots shifted down.)

Source: SporToto Süper Lig official website
Rules for classification: 1) points; 2) goal difference; 3) number of goals scored.
(C) Champions

==== Final results summary ====
Overall								Home						Away					
Pld	W	D	L	GF	GA	GD	Pts	W	D	L	GF	GA	GD	W	D	L	GF	GA	GD
6	4	1	1	9	4	+5	13	2	1	0	4	1	+3	2	0	1	5	3	+2

Source: Competitive Matches

==== Final results by round ====
Round	1	2	3	4	5	6
Ground	H	A	H	A	A	H
Result	W	W	W	L	W	D
Position	2	2	2	2	2	2

Source: Competitive Matches
A = Away; H = Home; W = Win; D = Draw; L = Loss

==== Final matches ====
Win Draw Loss Postponed

15 April 2012 1	Fenerbahçe	2–0	Trabzonspor	Istanbul
19:00 EET	Ziegler (yellow card) 4'; Cristian 36'; Sow (yellow card) 14', (goal) 61'; Belözoğlu (yellow card) 52'	Report	Balcı (yellow card) 10'; Adın (yellow card) 16'; Kaçar (yellow card) 47'; Mierzejewski (yellow card) 71'; Yılmaz (yellow card) 81'; Paulo Henrique (yellow card) 90'	Stadium: Şükrü Saracoğlu Stadium; Attendance: n/a Referee: Bülent Yıldırım

22 April 2012 2	Galatasaray	1–2	Fenerbahçe	Istanbul
19:00 EET	Melo (yellow card) 6'; İnan 68'	Report	Ziegler 17'; Erkin (yellow card) 31'; Alex (yellow card) 50'; Şahin (yellow card) 78'; Stoch 80'; Demirel (yellow card) 90'	Stadium: Türk Telekom Arena; Attendance: 51,567; Referee: Fırat Aydınus

29 April 2012 3	Fenerbahçe	2–1	Beşiktaş	Istanbul
19:00 EET	Cristian (yellow card) 21'; Şahin (yellow card) 45'; Stoch 57'; Korkmaz 83' (o.g.); Demirel (yellow card) 85'; Hurmacı (yellow card) 88'	Report	Korkmaz (yellow card) 21', (goal) 54'; Edu (yellow card) 21'; Hilbert (yellow card) 40'; Fernandes (yellow card) 41'; Kavlak (yellow card) 57'; Quaresma (yellow card) 65'; Reçber (yellow card) 90'; Toraman (yellow card) 90'; Ernst (yellow card) 90'	Stadium: Şükrü Saracoğlu Stadium; Attendance: n/a Referee: Halis Özkahya

3 May 2012 4	Beşiktaş	1–0	Fenerbahçe	Istanbul
20:00 EET	Almeida 45'; Korkmaz (yellow card) 49'; Kavlak (yellow card) 68'	Report	Jobo (yellow card) 47'	Stadium: BJK İnönü Stadium; Attendance: n/a Referee: Fırat Aydınus

6 May 2012 5	Trabzonspor	1–3	Fenerbahçe	Trabzon
19:00 EET	Yılmaz 45+4', (yellow card) 74'; Zokora (yellow card) 45+5'; Colman (yellow card) 45+6'; Kaçar (yellow card) 89'; Adın (yellow card) 89'	Report	Belözoğlu 3'; Gönül (yellow card) 17'; Bienvenu 31'; Cristian (yellow card) 31', (goal) 84'; Yobo (yellow card) 75'; Erkin (yellow card) 88'	Stadium: Hüseyin Avni Aker Stadium; Attendance: n/a Referee: Mustafa Kamil Abitoğlu

12 May 2012 6	Fenerbahçe	0–0	Galatasaray	Istanbul
19:00 EET	Dia (yellow card) 17' (yellow-red card) 65'; Yobo (yellow card) 69'; Şahin (yellow card) 72'; Belözoglu (yellow card) 76'; Demirel (yellow card) 83'; Ziegler (yellow card) 87'	Report	Melo (yellow card) 69'; Ujfaluši (yellow card) 78' (yellow-red card) 80'; Baroš (yellow card) 75'	Stadium: Şükrü Saracoğlu Stadium; Attendance: 52,000; Referee: Cüneyt Çakır

Source: Competitive Matches

=== Türkiye Kupası ===
Win Draw Loss Postponed

12 January 2012 Third round	Fenerbahçe	4–1	Konya Torku Şekerspor	Istanbul
20:30 EET	Bienvenu 10', 83', 85'; Alex (yellow card) 61', (goal) 73'	Report	Koç 89'	Stadium: Şükrü Saracoğlu Stadium; Attendance: n/a Referee: Koray Gençerler

21 March 2012 Fourth round	Fenerbahçe	3–0	Samsunspor	Istanbul
21:00 EET	Bienvenu 18'; Alex 21'; Şahin 34'; Stoch (yellow card) 90'	Report	Boral (yellow card) 31'; Tokak (yellow card) 90'	Stadium: Şükrü Saracoğlu Stadium; Attendance: 8.000; Referee: İlker Meral

11 April 2012 Quarter-final	Fenerbahçe	2–2 (a.e.t.) (5–4 p)	Kayserispor	Ankara
21:30 EET	Cristian 48'; Sow (yellow card) 86', (goal) 90+2'; Kesimal (yellow card) 95'; Şentürk (yellow card) 98'; Gönül (yellow card) 102'	Report	Amrabat (yellow card) 23', (goal) 43'; Kujović 47', (yellow card) 78'; Güngör (yellow card) 59'; Troisi (yellow card) 70'; Durak (yellow card) 90'; Özçal (yellow card) 90'; Khizanishvili (yellow card) 90'; Riveros (yellow card) 98'	Stadium: Ankara 19 Mayıs Stadium; Attendance: n/a Referee: Özgür Yankaya
	Penalties
	Şentürk (penalty scored); Ziegler (penalty scored); Kesimal (penalty scored); Sow (penalty scored); Cristian (penalty scored)		(penalty scored) Riveros; (penalty scored) Troisi; (penalty missed) Kujović; (penalty scored) Pekarík; (penalty scored) Kaldırım

26 April 2012 Semi-final	Kardemir Karabükspor	0–2	Fenerbahçe	Ankara
19:00 EET	Jahić (yellow card) 59'; Sarp (yellow card) 79'; Uçar (yellow card) 89'	Report	Şentürk 36'; Dia 58', (yellow card) 64'; Stoch (yellow card) 83'; Iravul (yellow card) 90'	Stadium: Ankara 19 Mayıs Stadium; Attendance: 19.000; Referee: Tolga Özkalfa

16 May 2012 Final	Bursaspor	0–4	Fenerbahçe	Ankara
20:30 EET	Chrétien (yellow card) 53'; Vederson (yellow card) 61'; Pinto (yellow card) 66'; Çağıran (yellow card) 83'	Report	Erkin 2'; Cristian 45', (yellow card) 45'; Şentürk 58'; Belözoğlu (yellow card) 73'; Alex 77'	Stadium: Ankara 19 Mayıs Stadium; Attendance: 19,500; Referee: Bülent Yıldırım; Man of the Match: Alex

Source: Competitive Matches

=== UEFA Champions League ===
Fenerbahçe was suspended by the TFF on 24 August 2011 from participating in the 2011–12 UEFA Champions League due to an ongoing investigation into match-fixing allegations. The club was replaced in the competition with Trabzonspor.

== Top scorers ==
Competition	Result	Top scorer
Süper Lig	2nd	(Brazil) Alex, 14
Türkiye Kupası	Winners	(Cameroon) Henri Bienvenu, 4
Overall		(Brazil) Alex, 17
