= Okan Alkan =

Turkish footballer (born 1992)

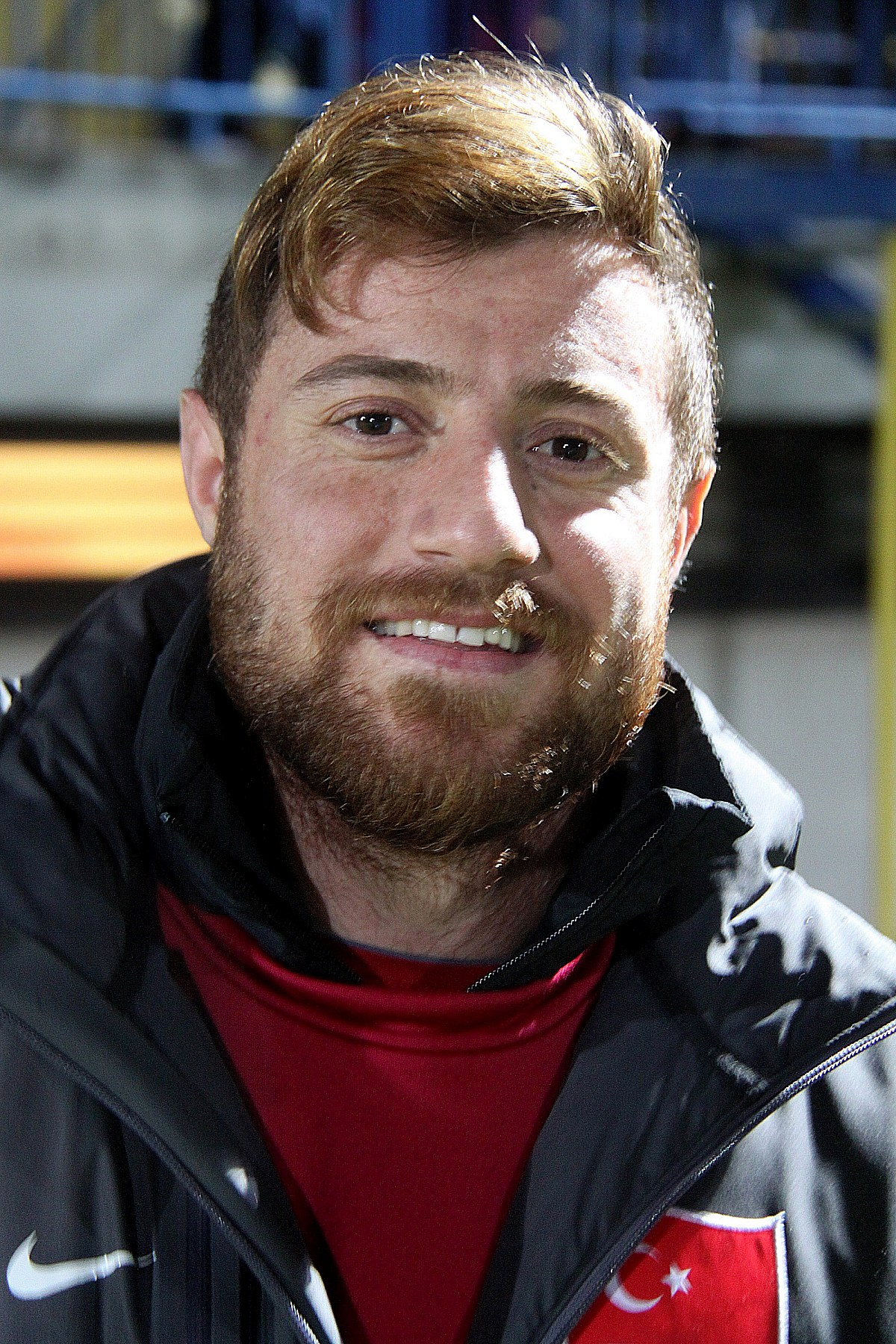
- Alkan in 2013

Personal information
- Date of birth: 1 October 1992 (age 34)
- Place of birth: Kızıltepe, Turkey
- Height: 1.70 m (5 ft 7 in)
- Positions: Right-back; right winger

Youth career
- 2006: Kızıltepe G.S.K.
- 2006–2007: Mardinspor
- 2007–2010: Fenerbahçe

Senior career*
Years	Team	Apps	(Gls)
2010–2012	Fenerbahçe	2	(0)
2011–2012	→ Kayserispor (loan)	7	(0)
2012–2014	Bucaspor	61	(1)
2014–2020	Balıkesirspor	123	(3)
2020–2021	Adana Demirspor	30	(0)
2021–2024	Bandırmaspor	46	(0)

International career
2007	Turkey U15	2	(0)
2008	Turkey U16	1	(0)
2008–2009	Turkey U17	20	(1)
2009	Turkey U18	9	(0)
2010–2011	Turkey U19	16	(0)
2012–2014	Turkey U21	3	(0)
- * Club domestic league appearances and goals as of 11 May 2024

Okan Alkan (born 1 October 1992) is a Turkish professional footballer who plays as a right back or right winger. A product of Fenerbahçe's youth system, he made his professional debut on 29 August 2010. At international level, he played for various Turkey youth national teams.

== Early years ==
Alkan was born in the city of Kızıltepe in the Mardin province of Turkey. One of six brothers, he joined a Fenerbahçe football school in Mardin as a 12-year-old, unbeknownst to his father. His father, who was also from Mardin, was not in favor of Alkan becoming a footballer. Instead, he encouraged Alkan to focus on school because he was already a good student. Alkan's brothers were also footballers, who competed in the TFF Third League. Alkan was selected for the team, but had to make a 60 TL payment every month to continue. He then informed his father for the first time that he had joined a football school, simply saying he was chosen for the team. When payment was brought up in the conversation, Alkan's father said he would be unable to pay the 60 TL charge every month. However, Alkan was held in regard with the school and was able to work out a one-off payment of 60 TL to continue playing and learning at the school. Alkan's father was angry at first, with Alkan having signed up for the school without his knowledge, but has been supporting his son's career since. Alkan moved to Kızıltepe Eğitim Gençlik ve Spor Kulübü in February 2006, before moving to Mardinspor for a fee of 10,000 TL in September 2006, where he won a call-up to the Turkey U-15 squad in 2007. Originally a winger on both sides, Alkan converted to right back, where he has drawn comparisons to Fenerbahçe and Turkish international, Gökhan Gönül.

== Club career ==
=== Fenerbahçe (2007–2011) ===
In 2007, Alkan transferred to Süper Lig club Fenerbahçe. He started out with the B Genç team (14-16 year olds). The next season, he was promoted to the Süper Genç team (16-18), where he made 21 appearances in the DGSL (Deplasmanlı Süper Gençler Ligi). Alkan was promoted to the A2 team (U-20) at the beginning of the 2009–10 season, making 17 appearances. Alkan was the starting right-back of the Fenerbahçe A2 team that took part in the Milk Cup, losing to Manchester United 2–1 in the semi-finals. Alkan was sent off in the first half after handling the ball inside the penalty box. Alkan also began training with the senior team at the same time. One day, after a training session, Alkan was pulled aside by Roberto Carlos, who praised the youngsters potential, but also pointed out weaknesses he must improve upon. Roberto Carlos compared Alkan to his former Brazil teammate, Cafu. Gökhan Gönül has also helped tutor the youngster. Alkan explained in an interview with TFF.org that he and Gönül sit down after training to discuss what Alkan needs to do to improve his game. Several players were ineligible, either through injury or suspension, for a tie against Bursaspor in February 2010, prompting then-manager Christoph Daum to include Alkan, Gökay Iravul, and Furkan Aydın in the match squad. It was the first time Alkan was included in a match squad.

No, (Aykut) told me I would play yesterday. He told me "play the way you play, I believe in you". This helped me concentrate and I thank my manager for giving me the chance.

— Okan Alkan

He made his professional debut for the club on 29 August 2010 against Manisaspor, playing the full ninety minutes. Alkan had two scoring chances during the match. He helped provide the first goal when his cross slipped through İlker Avcıbay's hands, falling to Alex's feet, who netted the rebound. Alkan also assisted Mamadou Niang's first goal, whipping in a ball from the right flank that met the head of the Senegalese international. Alex expressed his happiness for the youngster, saying "I'm happy because it's the first time a youth player was given a chance to start during my six-year span with the club." Manager Aykut Kocaman praised Alkan's performance after the match and said he was very pleased.

Alkan started on the right wing for Fenerbahçe in the Cumhuriyet Kupası (Republic Cup) against Sivasspor, with the team winning 3–0. The cup was a friendly match played during the international break. Erdal Güçükkara replaced Alkan in the 62nd minute of the match after Alkan suffered an injury. Alkan also started at right back for the third round matchup against Kayserispor in place of the injured Gönül. Alkan played the entire 90 minutes in a 2–0 loss. After Gönül's return, Alkan was sent back to the A2 team, making his second A2 appearance in a 3–1 win over Güngören Belediyespor.

Alkan made his Turkish Cup debut in a 2–1 loss to TFF Second League club Yeni Malatyaspor, putting the ball past his own keeper in the 23rd minute.

Alkan moved to Kayserispor on a two-year loan after Serdar Kesimal was transferred to Fenerbahçe. His loan deal was terminated after one year and he moved to Bucaspor on a free transfer.

== International career ==
In April 2007, Alkan was called up to the Turkey U-15 squad for two friendlies against the Netherlands U-15s. Alkan came on as a sub in the first match, and then played the entirety of the second match. A year later, Alkan was called up to the U-16 squad, making one appearance for the squad. In September 2008, Alkan was called up to the Turkey U-17 team. In a match against the Malta U-17s, Alkan came on as a substitute in the 41st minute and contributed two assists. Alkan cites this performance as one of the turning points in his career. He participated in 13 matches (including substitutions) and scored one goal. Alkan was the starting right back for the Turkey squad at the 2009 FIFA U-17 World Cup. They were knocked out by Colombia in the quarter-finals after a 1–1 draw (Colombia won 5–3 on penalties). Alkan was also selected for the U-18 squad five times in 2009, but was not capped. Alkan was promoted to the U-19 team in 2010. Alkan was the starting right back for the U-19 team that finished second in Group 4 of the 2010 UEFA European Under-19 Football Championship elite qualification behind Spain. He made his debut for the U-21 team on 5 September 2012 in a friendly match against Italy.

== Style of play ==
Alkan, who has drawn comparisons to Gökhan Gönül and Cafu, can play along the right flank, at either right back or right winger.

== Personal life ==
Alkan has five brothers and one sister. In his free time he enjoys playing table tennis, billiards, and PlayStation.

== Career statistics ==
As of 18 January 2013

Appearances and goals by club, season and competition
Club	Season	League		Cup		Europe		Total	
Club	Season	Apps	Goals	Apps	Goals	Apps	Goals	Apps	Goals
Fenerbahçe	2010–11	2	0	1	0	0	0	3	0
Kayserispor (loan)	2011–12	7	0	1	0	0	0	8	0
Bucaspor	2012–13	16	0	0	0	0	0	16	0
Career total		25	0	2	0	0	0	27	0

== Honours ==
Fenerbahçe

- Süper Lig: 2010–11
