= Murat Öztürk =

Murat Öztürk may refer to the following people:

- Murat Öztürk (footballer)
- Murat Öztürk (aviator)
