= İlhan Eker =

Turkish footballer

Ilhan Eker
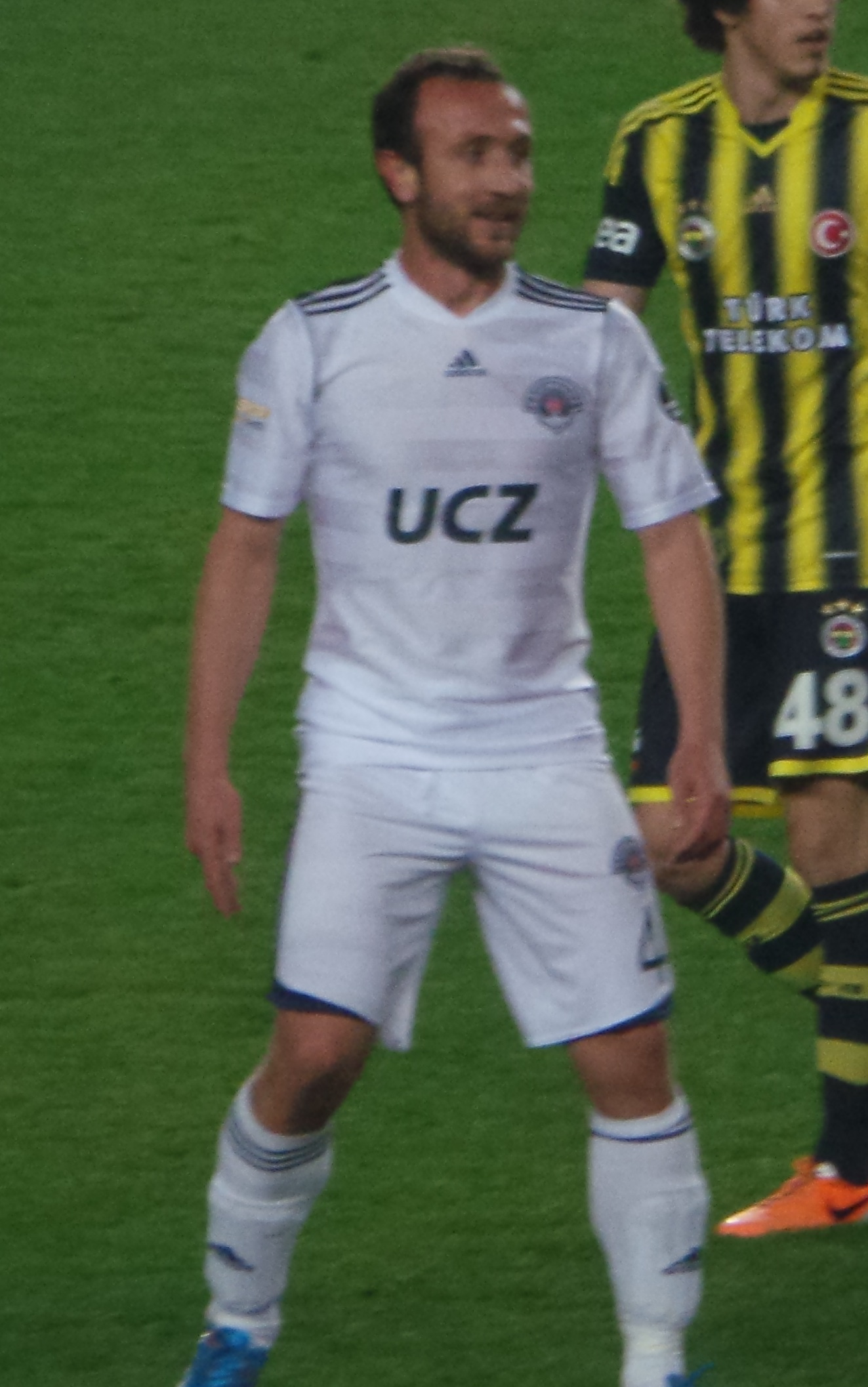

Personal information
- Date of birth: 1 January 1983 (age 43)
- Place of birth: Balıkesir, Turkey
- Height: 1.85 m (6 ft 1 in)
- Position: Defender

Youth career
- –1999: Balıkesirspor

Senior career*
Years	Team	Apps	(Gls)
1999–2001	Balıkesirspor	12	(0)
2001–2008	Gençlerbirliği OFTAŞ	174	(10)
2008–2010	Gençlerbirliği	38	(0)
2010–2011	Fenerbahçe	1	(0)
2011–2012	Kayserispor	9	(0)
2012–2015	Kasımpaşaspor	55	(5)
2016–2017	Balıkesirspor	12	(1)
- * Club domestic league appearances and goals

İlhan Eker (born 1 January 1983) is a Turkish former professional football defender. Standing at 185 cm, he was equally adept at playmaking and scoring.

== Career ==
Eker has previously played for Balıkesirspor. From Balıkesirspor, he moved to Hacettepe Spor in 2001. Seven years later, Eker transferred from Gençlerbirliği OFTAŞ, which is now called Hacettepe Spor, to Gençlerbirliği. On 2 June 2010, the 27-year-old center back left Gençlerbirliği to sign with Fenerbahçe until 30 June 2013. Eker was sent to Kayserispor in exchange for Serdar Kesimal, who moved to Fenerbahçe SK.
