= Bülent Bal =

Turkish footballer

Personal information
- Full name: Bülent Bal
- Date of birth: August 5, 1977 (age 49)
- Place of birth: Bursa, Turkey
- Height: 1.83 m (6 ft 0 in)
- Position: Centre back

Team information
- Current team: Nilüfer Erdemli Sportif

Senior career*
Years	Team	Apps	(Gls)
1997–1999	Mustafa Kemalpaşaspor	56	(2)
1999	Gaziantepspor	0	(0)
1999–2000	Gaziantep B.B.	18	(0)
2000	Bursaspor	0	(0)
2000–2003	Elazığspor	82	(4)
2003–2004	Dardanelspor	31	(2)
2004–2005	Elazığspor	31	(1)
2005–2006	Bursaspor	6	(0)
2006–2007	Eskişehirspor	24	(2)
2007–2008	Diyarbakırspor	33	(9)
2008–2011	Karabükspor	67	(6)
2011–2012	Göztepe	21	(0)
2012–2013	Bandırmaspor	26	(1)
2014–2015	Mudanyaspor	26	(2)
2016–	Nilüfer Erdemli Sportif	0	(0)
- * Club domestic league appearances and goals

Bülent Bal (born 5 August 1977) is a Turkish professional footballer who currently plays as a centre back for Nilüfer Erdemli Sportif.
