= Deyvison =

Brazilian footballer (born 1988)

Personal information
- Full name: Deyvison Denílson de Sousa Bessas
- Date of birth: 18 October 1988 (age 38)
- Place of birth: Minas Gerais, Brazil
- Height: 1.86 m (6 ft 1 in)
- Position: Centre-back

Youth career
- Democrata
- América (MG)

Senior career*
Years	Team	Apps	(Gls)
2010–2011	América (MG)	0	(0)
2011–2013	Kartalspor	33	(1)
2013–2015	Tondela	72	(3)
2015–2017	Marítimo	34	(0)
2017–2019	Arouca	45	(1)
2019–2021	Ethnikos Achna	42	(0)
2021–2022	Vilafranquense	5	(0)
- * Club domestic league appearances and goals as of 15 January 2022

Deyvison Denílson de Sousa Bessas or Deyvison for short (born 18 October 1988) is a Brazilian professional footballer, who plays as a centre-back.
