= Murat Özaydınlı =

Turkish businessman and mechanical engineer

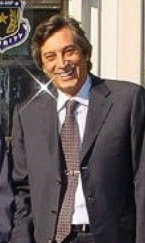
Murat Özaydınlı

Osman Murat Özaydınlı (22 May 1954 in Istanbul, Turkey) is a businessman, mechanical engineer and former vice-president of Turkish sport club Fenerbahçe SK. He received his B.A. in from University of Bradford by Mechanical engineering and then followed by his Master's degree from University of Leeds by Industrial engineering.

On 29 July 2011 Özaydınlı was taken into custody over allegations of several cases of player manipulation.

== Personal life ==
He is son of Army General İrfan Özaydınlı who was Minister of the Interior between (5 January 1978 - 2 January 1979) in Turkey.
