= Musa Aydın =

Turkish footballer

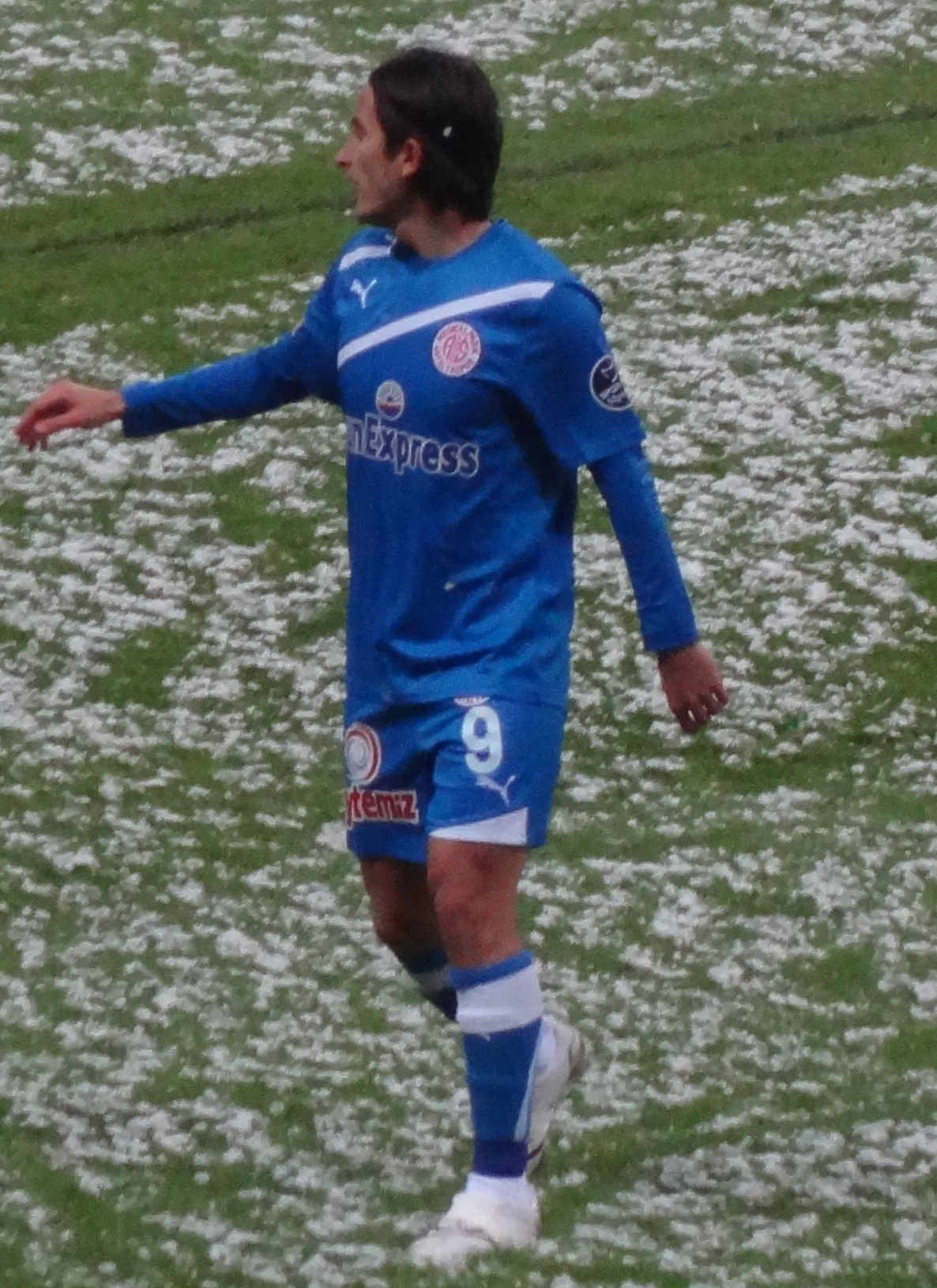

Personal information
- Full name: Musa Aydın
- Date of birth: 1 November 1980 (age 46)
- Place of birth: Samsun, Turkey
- Height: 1.72 m (5 ft 8 in)
- Position: Winger

Youth career
- 1991–1999: Ceditılıcaspor
- 1999–2000: Samsunspor

Senior career*
Years	Team	Apps	(Gls)
2000–2006	Samsunspor	136	(9)
2006–2007	Sakaryaspor	32	(3)
2007–2010	Sivasspor	95	(16)
2010–2011	Bucaspor	21	(5)
2011–2012	Antalyaspor	20	(0)
2012–2016	Samsunspor	114	(13)
- * Club domestic league appearances and goals

Musa Aydın (born 1 November 1980 in Samsun) is a former Turkish footballer.

At the start of the 2009–10 season, he scored a Champions League goal for Sivasspor against Anderlecht in the second leg of the third round qualifying, in a game that Sivas won 3–1.
