= Serdar Özbayraktar =

Turkish footballer

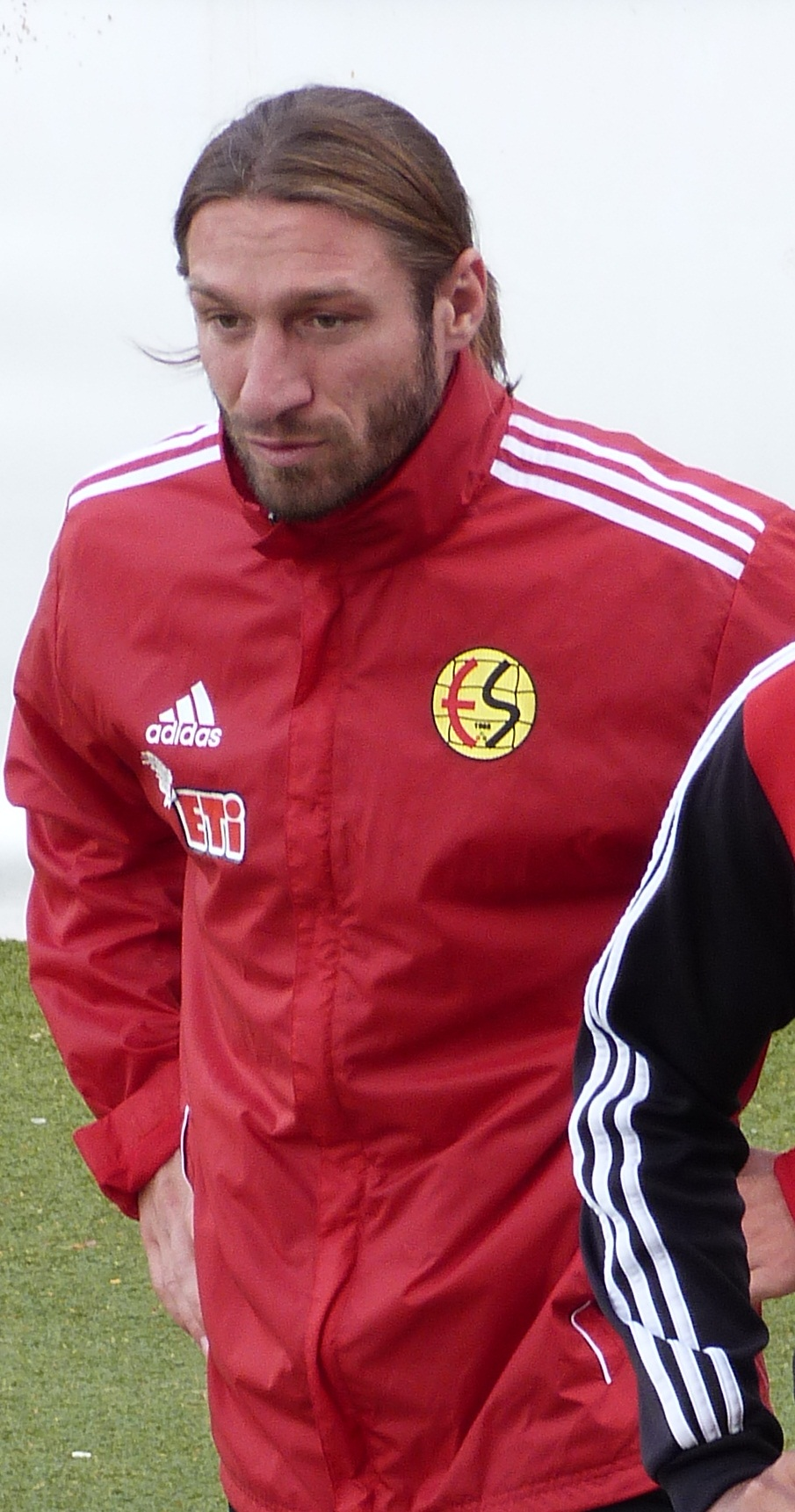

Personal information
- Full name: Serdar Özbayraktar
- Date of birth: November 22, 1981 (age 44)
- Place of birth: Artvin, Turkey
- Height: 1.80 m (5 ft 11 in)
- Positions: Forward; winger

Youth career
- 2000–2001: Artvin Hopaspor

Senior career*
Years	Team	Apps	(Gls)
2001–2002	Gençlerbirliği	0	(0)
2001–2002	→ Gençlerbirliği OFTAŞ (loan)	25	(10)
2002–2004	Şanlıurfaspor	51	(23)
2004–2005	Mardinspor	18	(1)
2005–2007	Gaziantep BB	64	(27)
2007–2012	Eskişehirspor	112	(13)
2012–2014	Gaziantepspor	43	(3)
2014–2015	Şanlıurfaspor	15	(3)
2015–2016	Elazığspor	16	(9)
2016	Göztepe	10	(0)
2016–2018	Ümraniyespor	60	(7)
2018–2019	Fatih Karagümrük	6	(0)
2019	Elazığspor	25	(4)
2020	Artvin Hopaspor	1	(0)
- * Club domestic league appearances and goals as of 21 July 2020

Serdar Özbayraktar (born November 22, 1981) is a Turkish retired football player who played as a striker or winger.

== Career ==
=== Elazığspor ===
On the last day of the January transfer market 2019, Özbayraktar was one of 22 players on two hours, that signed for Turkish club Elazığspor. had been placed under a transfer embargo but managed to negotiate it with the Turkish FA, leading to them going on a mad spree of signing and registering a load of players despite not even having a permanent manager in place. In just two hours, they managed to snap up a record 22 players - 12 coming in on permanent contracts and a further 10 joining on loan deals until the end of the season.
