= Erkan Taşkıran =

Turkish footballer

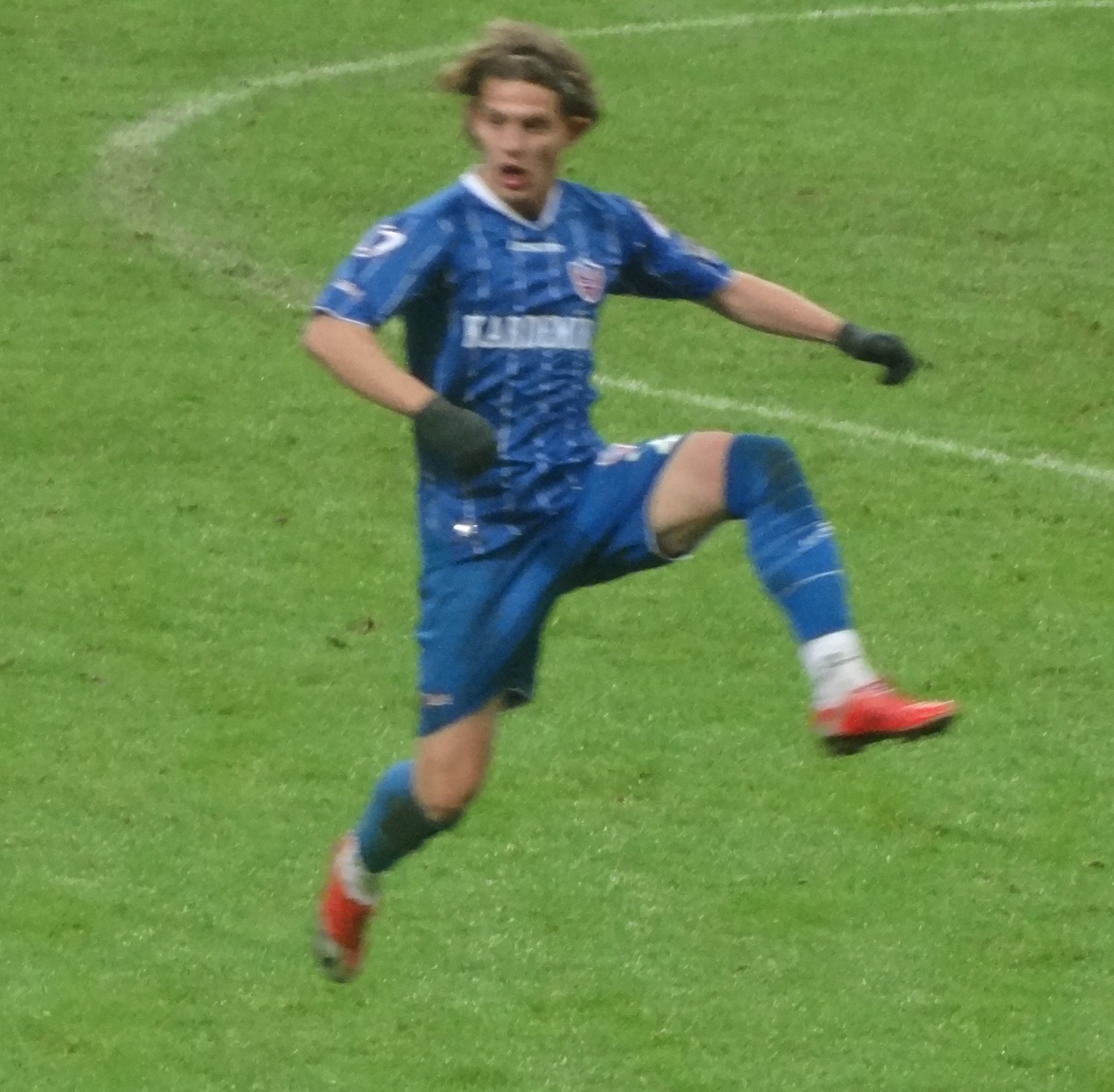

Personal information
- Full name: Erkan Taşkıran
- Date of birth: 22 April 1985 (age 41)
- Place of birth: Bornova, İzmir, Turkey
- Height: 1.83 m (6 ft 0 in)
- Position: Winger

Team information
- Current team: Bandırmaspor
- Number: 11

Youth career
- 1998–2001: Umurbey Altınok
- 2001–2003: Gençlerbirliği

Senior career*
Years	Team	Apps	(Gls)
2003–2004	Gençlerbirliği	0	(0)
2004–2006	Hacettepe	15	(2)
2006	→ Marmaris Bld. (loan)	12	(3)
2006–2007	Marmaris Bld.	26	(5)
2007–2011	Bucaspor	74	(17)
2011–2012	Karabükspor	17	(0)
2012–2013	Bucaspor	28	(7)
2013–2014	Akhisar Belediyespor	9	(1)
2014–2016	Bucaspor	30	(4)
2016	Keçiörengücü	17	(2)
2016–2017	Bucaspor	28	(10)
2017–2018	BAKspor	27	(13)
2018–2019	Kastamonuspor 1966	31	(10)
2019–	Bandırmaspor	26	(7)
- * Club domestic league appearances and goals as of 15 March 2020

Erkan Taşkıran (born 22 April 1985) is a Turkish professional footballer who plays as a midfielder for Bandırmaspor.

== Career ==
On 31 August 2016, he joined Bucaspor on a two-year contract.
