= Gökhan Çalışal =

German-Turkish footballer

Personal information
- Date of birth: 2 April 1980 (age 46)
- Place of birth: Hechingen, West Germany
- Position: Left-back

Senior career*
Years	Team	Apps	(Gls)
- Sivasspor
- Sakaryaspor
- Eskişehirspor
- Boluspor
- Kartalspor
- Yeni Malatyaspor
- * Club domestic league appearances and goals

Gökhan Çalışal (born 2 April 1980 in Hechingen, West Germany) is a German-Turkish former professional footballer who played as a left-back he played in the Yeni Malatyaspor in the TFF Second League and previously for Kartalspor, Boluspor, Eskişehirspor, Sakaryaspor and Sivasspor.
