= Kağan Söylemezgiller =

Turkish footballer

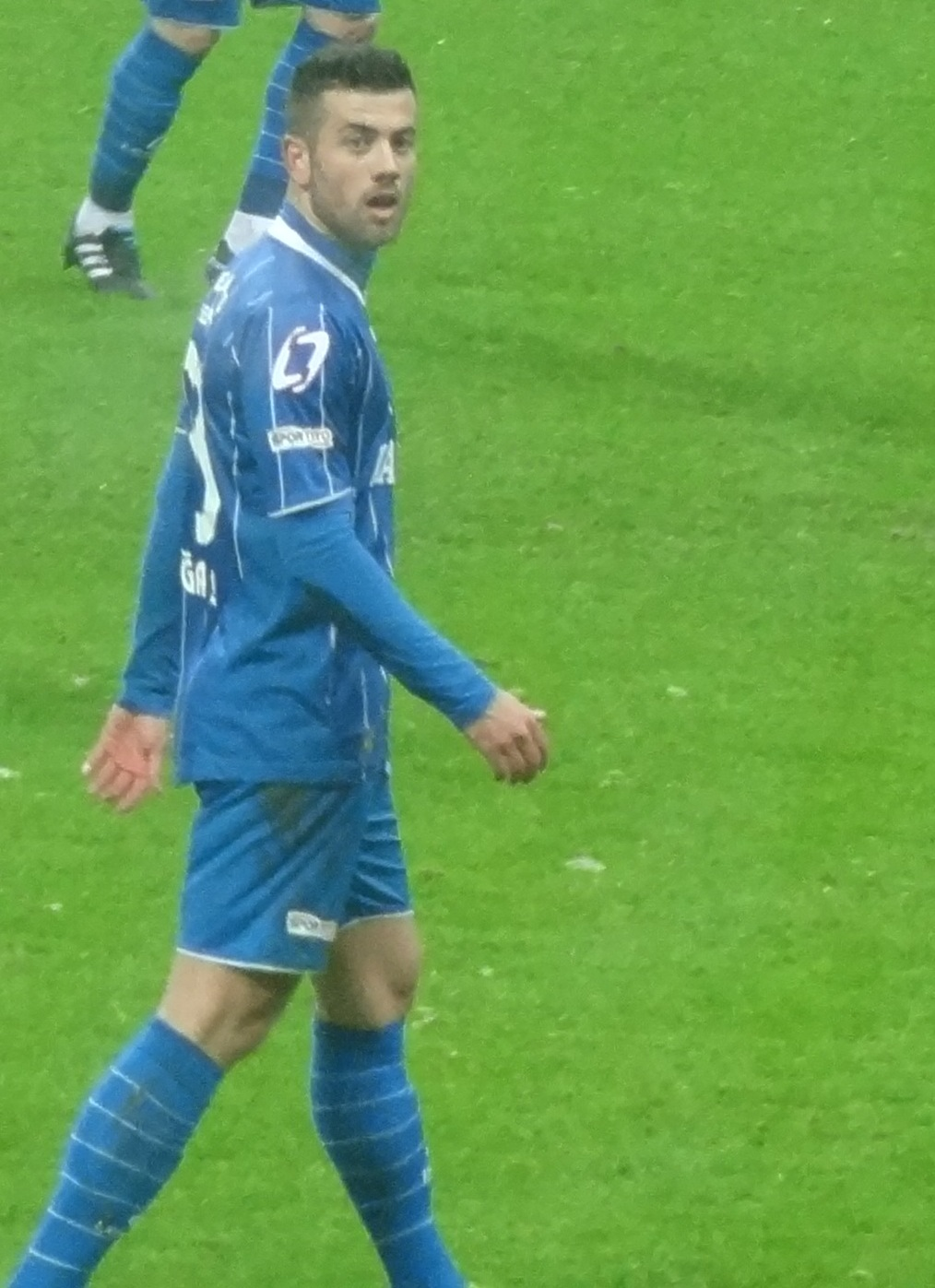

Personal information
- Full name: Kağan Söylemezgiller
- Date of birth: 4 March 1988 (age 38)
- Place of birth: Stuttgart, West Germany
- Height: 1.79 m (5 ft 10 in)
- Position: Attacking midfielder

Youth career
- 200?–2007: Stuttgarter Kickers
- 2007–2008: VfB Stuttgart

Senior career*
Years	Team	Apps	(Gls)
2008–2010	VfL Kirchheim/Teck	49	(1)
2010–2011	Ankaragücü	45	(1)
2012–2013	Kardemir Karabükspor	31	(1)
2013–2015	Çaykur Rizespor	29	(0)
2015–2016	Wil	18	(1)
2016–2017	Şanlıurfaspor	28	(0)
2017–2018	Gümüşhanespor	22	(3)
2018–2019	Fethiyespor	14	(0)
2019	Adanaspor	5	(0)

International career
2011–2012	Turkey A2	8	(0)
- * Club domestic league appearances and goals as of 00:10, 26 June 2019 (UTC)

Kağan Söylemezgiller (born 4 March 1988) is a Turkish footballer who plays as an attacking midfielder.
