= Ekrem Ekşioğlu =

Turkish footballer

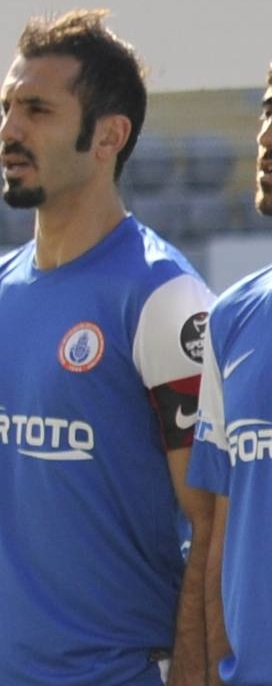

Personal information
- Full name: Ekrem Ekşioğlu
- Date of birth: January 16, 1978 (age 48)
- Place of birth: Ankara, Turkey
- Height: 1.84 m (6 ft 1/2 in)
- Position: Right back

Senior career*
Years	Team	Apps	(Gls)
1999–2001	Hatayspor		
2001–2003	Erzurumspor		
2003–2005	Akçaabat Sebatspor	31	(0)
2005–2006	Karşıyaka	30	(1)
2007–2013	Istanbul BB	190	(3)
2013–2014	Kayseri Erciyesspor	21	(0)
- * Club domestic league appearances and goals

Ekrem Ekşioğlu (born January 16, 1978, in Ankara) is a Turkish retired football defender.
