= Ertuğrul Taşkıran =

Turkish footballer (born 1989)

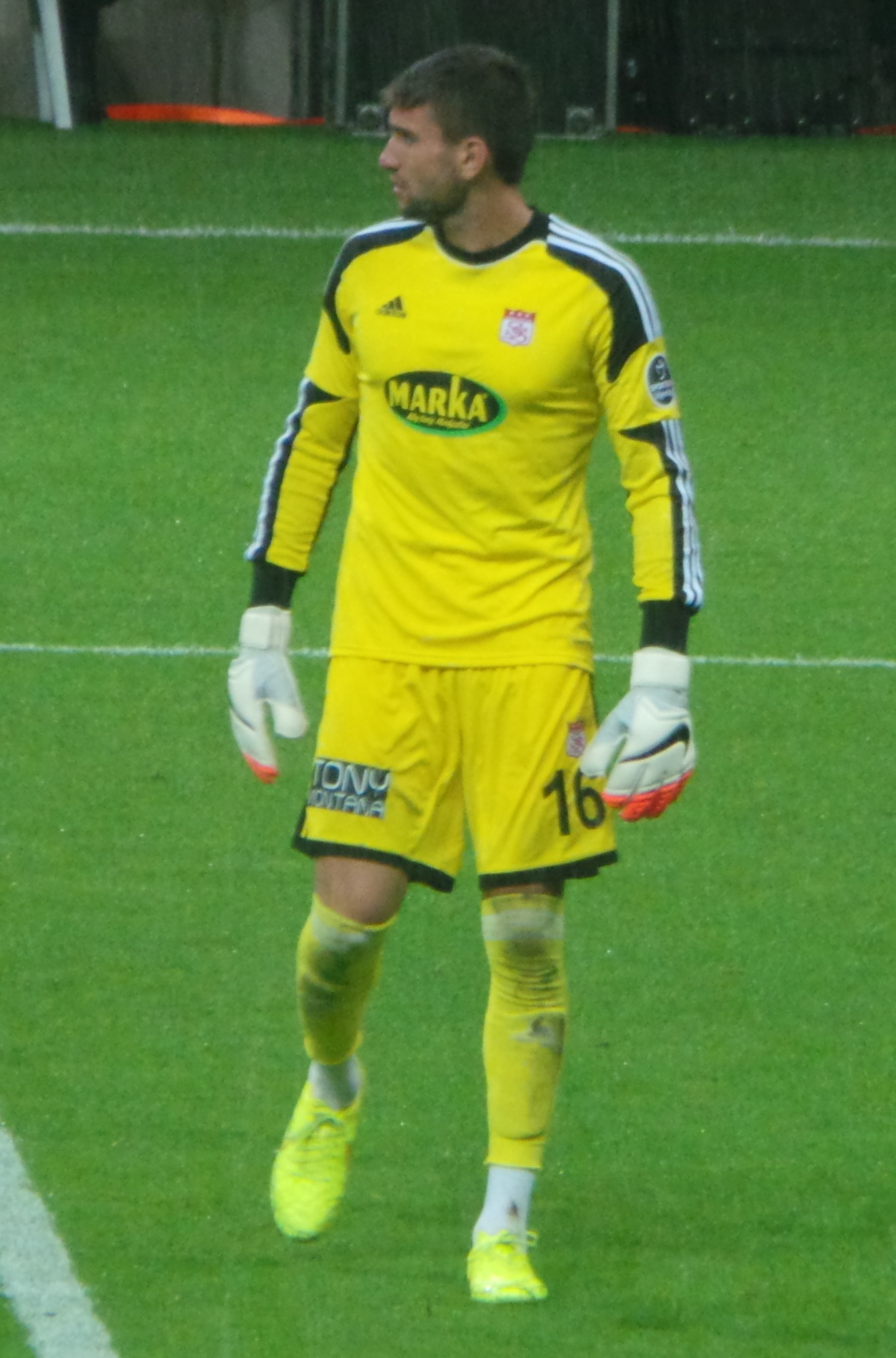

Personal information
- Full name: Mahmut Ertuğrul Taşkıran
- Date of birth: 5 November 1989 (age 37)
- Place of birth: Istanbul, Turkey
- Height: 1.91 m (6 ft 3 in)
- Position: Goalkeeper

Team information
- Current team: Erzurumspor
- Number: 1

Youth career
- 2002–2007: Kartalspor
- 2007–2011: Fenerbahçe

Senior career*
Years	Team	Apps	(Gls)
2011–2017	Fenerbahçe	1	(0)
2011–2012	→ Samsunspor (loan)	27	(0)
2012–2014	→ Kayserispor (loan)	42	(0)
2014–2015	→ Sivasspor (loan)	20	(0)
2017–2018	Boluspor	2	(0)
2018–2020	Konyaspor	11	(0)
2020–2023	Kasımpaşa	64	(0)
2023–2026	Alanyaspor	88	(0)
2026–	Erzurumspor	5	(0)

International career^{‡}
2005–2006	Turkey U17	6	(0)
2006	Turkey U18	3	(0)
2012–2013	Turkey B	8	(0)
- * Club domestic league appearances and goals as of 10 October 2026 ‡ National team caps and goals as of 19 December 2015

Mahmut Ertuğrul Taşkıran (born 5 November 1989) is a Turkish professional footballer who plays as a goalkeeper for Süper Lig club Erzurumspor.

== Club career ==
Taşkıran joined the Fenerbahçe academy ahead of the 2007–08 season from childhood club Kartalspor.

He would go on to make his professional debut while on loan at Samsunspor, replacing Álvaro Domínguez after starting goalkeeper Ahmet Şahin was sent off in a 3–1 loss to Galatasaray on 18 September 2011. He would remain Samsunspor's starter for the rest of the 2011–12 season.

In July 2023, he joined Alanyaspor on a two-year deal.

== Career statistics ==
As of match played 25 May 2025

Appearances and goals by club, season and competition
Club	Season	League			National cup		Europe		Other		Total	
Club	Season	Division	Apps	Goals	Apps	Goals	Apps	Goals	Apps	Goals	Apps	Goals
Fenerbahçe	2009–10	Süper Lig	0	0	0	0	0	0	0	0	0	0
Fenerbahçe	2010–11	Süper Lig	0	0	0	0	0	0	—		0	0
Fenerbahçe	2015–16	Süper Lig	0	0	3	0	0	0	—		3	0
Fenerbahçe	2016–17	Süper Lig	1	0	0	0	2	0	—		3	0
Fenerbahçe	Total		1	0	3	0	2	0	0	0	6	0
Samsunspor (loan)	2011–12	Süper Lig	27	0	1	0	—		—		28	0
Kayserispor (loan)	2012–13	Süper Lig	30	0	1	0	—		—		21	0
Kayserispor (loan)	2013–14	Süper Lig	13	0	2	0	—		—		15	0
Kayserispor (loan)	Total		43	0	3	0	—		—		46	0
Sivasspor (loan)	2014–15	Süper Lig	20	0	8	0	—		—		28	0
Boluspor	2017–18	1. Lig	2	0	4	0	—		0	0	6	0
Konyaspor	2018–19	Süper Lig	1	0	2	0	—		—		3	0
Konyaspor	2019–20	Süper Lig	10	0	1	0	—		—		11	0
Konyaspor	Total		11	0	3	0	—		—		14	0
Kasımpaşa	2020–21	Süper Lig	19	0	2	0	—		—		21	0
Kasımpaşa	2021–22	Süper Lig	27	0	0	0	—		—		27	0
Kasımpaşa	2022–23	Süper Lig	18	0	2	0	—		—		20	0
Kasımpaşa	Total		64	0	4	0	—		—		68	0
Alanyaspor	2023–24	Süper Lig	34	0	0	0	—		—		34	0
Alanyaspor	2024–25	Süper Lig	34	0	9	0	—		—		34	0
Alanyaspor	Total		68	0	0	0	—		—		68	0
Career total			236	0	35	0	2	0	0	0	273	0

== Honours ==
Fenerbahçe

- Turkish Super Cup: 2009
- Süper Lig: 2010–11
