= Furkan Aydın =

Turkish footballer (born 1991)

Personal information
- Full name: Furkan Aydın
- Date of birth: 22 February 1991 (age 35)
- Place of birth: Adapazarı, Turkey
- Height: 1.91 m (6 ft 3 in)
- Position: Striker

Youth career
- 2003–2008: Sakaryaspor

Senior career*
Years	Team	Apps	(Gls)
2008–2009	Sakaryaspor	2	(0)
2009–2014	Fenerbahçe	0	(0)
2010–2011	→ Çankırıspor (loan)	26	(10)
2011–2012	→ Bozüyükspor (loan)	27	(4)
2012–2013	→ Nazilli Belediyespor (loan)	12	(1)
2013	→ Turgutluspor (loan)	5	(1)
2013	→ Eyüpspor (loan)	3	(0)
2014	→ Tuzlaspor (loan)	14	(3)
2014–2015	Payasspor	30	(8)
2015	İnegölspor	1	(0)
2016–2017	Zonguldak Kömürspor	42	(1)
2017–2018	Ofspor	20	(3)
2018–2019	Bergama Belediyespor	19	(1)
2019–2020	Karaman Belediyespor	16	(4)

International career
2008	Turkey U17	3	(2)
2009	Turkey U18	6	(7)
2009	Turkey U19	3	(2)
- * Club domestic league appearances and goals as of 00:33, 3 January 2021 (UTC)

Furkan Aydın (born 22 February 1991) is a Turkish footballer.

== Career ==
He has played at Sakaryaspor all his life but only featuring in youth leagues. In the season 2007-2008 he had 22 appearances in the A2 League where he bagged 12 goals. He has also featured in the A2 League scoring 3 goals in 3 appearances.

He signed for Fenerbahçe on 15 January 2009, signing a three-year contract but was allowed to see out the rest of the season at Sakaryaspor.

He was sent to Çankırı Belediye Spor on loan for the 2010/2011 season to gain some experience as a striker.

On 8 August 2012, he went on loan to Nazilli Belediyespor.

== International ==
Furkan was called up to Turkey U-17 in July 2008 where he played 3 international friendlies in 4 days and scored 2 goals.
