= Gökay Iravul =

Turkish footballer

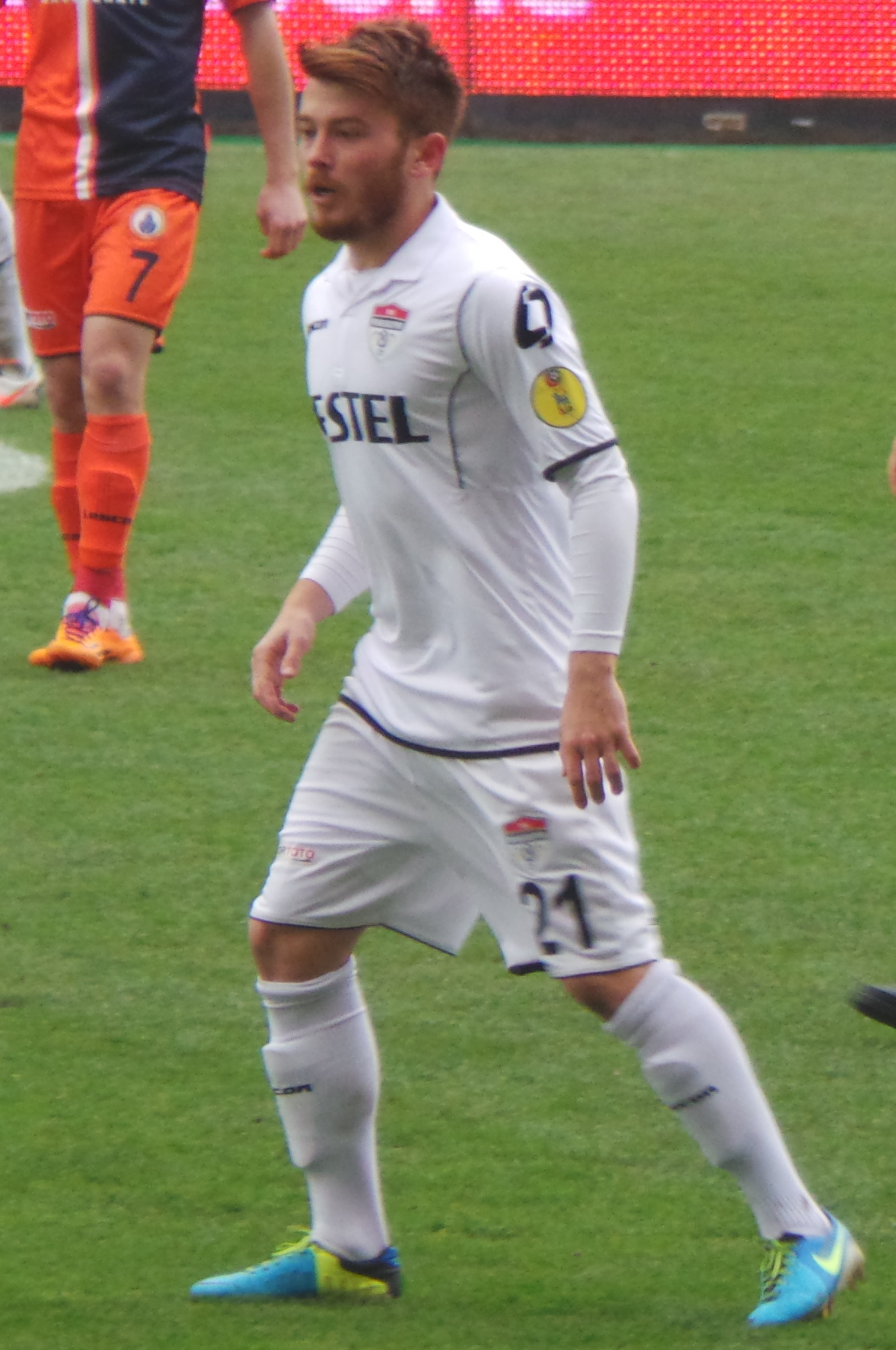

Personal information
- Date of birth: 18 October 1992 (age 34)
- Place of birth: Denizli, Turkey
- Height: 1.71 m (5 ft 7 in)
- Position: Central midfielder

Team information
- Current team: Amasyaspor FK
- Number: 18

Youth career
- 2001–2007: Denizlispor
- 2007–2010: Fenerbahçe

Senior career*
Years	Team	Apps	(Gls)
2007–2011	Fenerbahçe A2	30	(7)
2010–2016	Fenerbahçe	14	(0)
2012–2013	→ Manisaspor (loan)	23	(0)
2013–2014	→ Adana Demirspor (loan)	12	(0)
2014	→ Gaziantep BB (loan)	1	(0)
2015–2016	→ Alanyaspor (loan)	12	(1)
2016–2018	Alanyaspor	14	(1)
2017	→ Samsunspor (loan)	12	(3)
2017–2018	→ Samsunspor (loan)	19	(2)
2018–2019	Fatih Karagümrük	10	(0)
2019	Bayrampaşaspor	15	(2)
2019–2020	Etimesgut Belediyespor	9	(0)
2020–2021	Kırşehir Belediyespor	29	(0)
2021–2022	Ergene Velimeşe	19	(0)
2022–2023	Nevşehir Belediyespor	28	(0)
2023–	Amasyaspor FK	3	(0)

International career
2007	Turkey U15	2	(0)
2007–2008	Turkey U16	22	(2)
2009	Turkey U17	4	(2)
2009–2010	Turkey U18	7	(0)
2010–2011	Turkey U19	12	(1)
2011–2013	Turkey U21	9	(0)
- * Club domestic league appearances and goals as of 23 September 2023

Gökay Iravul (born 18 October 1992) is a Turkish footballer who plays as a midfielder for TFF Third League club Amasyaspor FK.

== Early life ==
Iravul began his footballing career with local club Denizlispor in 2001, starting with the Junior Team (10–12 years old). After one year, Iravul was promoted to the Star Team (12–14) and began playing for the B Youth Team (14–16) soon after. Iravul impressed Fenerbahçe scouts at a B Youth Team match between Denizlispor and Fenerbahçe and was signed by the Istanbul club a year later.

== Career ==
Iravul signed his first professional contract with Fenerbahçe on 3 July 2007. He began with playing with the Super Youth Team (16–18) in 2008, totaling three goals in 29 appearances. The following season, Iravul was promoted to the A2 squad. Iravul has scored seven goals in 30 appearances in the A2 League. Fenerbahçe signed him to a three-year contract extension at the start of the 2010–11 season and the midfielder was included in the squad for pre-season preparations. Iravul earned his first senior team call-up under Aykut Kocaman and made his professional debut against Gençlerbirliği on 2 October 2010, coming on as a substitution for Mamadou Niang in the 88th minute.

== International career ==
Iravul began his international career with the Turkey U-15 squad. He was a part of the Turkey squad at the 2009 FIFA U-17 World Cup, making four appearances and scoring a goal.

== Career statistics ==
As of 30 June 2013

Club	Season	League		Cup (Note: Includes Türkiye Kupası, Süper Kupa)		Europe (Note: Includes UEFA Champions League, UEFA Europa League)		Total	
Club	Season	Apps	Goals	Apps	Goals	Apps	Goals	Apps	Goals
Fenerbahçe	2010–11	11	0	3	0	0	0	14	0
Fenerbahçe	2011–12	3	0	1	0	-	-	4	0
Fenerbahçe	Total	14	0	4	0	0	0	17	0
Manisaspor (loan)	2012–13	23	0	2	0	-	-	25	0
Manisaspor (loan)	Total	23	0	2	0	0	0	25	0
Career total		37	0	6	0	0	0	42	0

== Honours ==
Fenerbahçe

- Süper Lig (1): 2010–11
- Türkiye Kupası (1): 2011–12

== Personal life ==
Iravul has one older sister. His mother is a housewife and his father is a retired bank manager.
