= Orhan Şam =

Turkish footballer

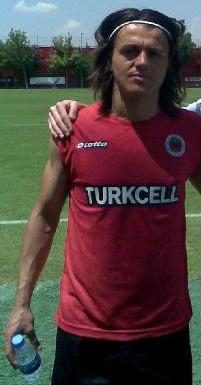

Personal information
- Full name: Orhan Şam
- Date of birth: 1 June 1986 (age 40)
- Place of birth: Zonguldak, Turkey
- Height: 1.82 m (5 ft 11 1/2 in)
- Position: Full back

Youth career
- 1996–2001: Erdemirspor
- 2001–2003: Gençlerbirliği

Senior career*
Years	Team	Apps	(Gls)
2003–2011	Gençlerbirliği	59	(4)
2004–2005	→ Hacettepe (loan)	14	(0)
2005–2006	→ Mardinspor (loan)	31	(2)
2006–2009	→ Hacettepe (loan)	94	(1)
2011–2013	Fenerbahçe	20	(0)
2013–2016	Kasımpaşa	19	(0)
2016–2018	Gençlerbirliği	3	(0)
2018	Elazığspor	23	(0)
2019	BB Bodrumspor	22	(1)

International career
2002	Turkey U17	11	(0)
2002–2003	Turkey U18	16	(0)
2003–2004	Turkey U19	24	(0)
2006–2008	Turkey U21	21	(0)
- * Club domestic league appearances and goals as of 26 October 2019

Orhan Şam (born 1 June 1986) is a retired Turkish footballer who played as a right back or centre back.

== Career ==
His professional football debut for Gençlerbirliği was on 25 May 2003 against Samsunspor. He played on loan.th Hacettepe in 2005, Mardinspor in 2006 and Hacettepe again between 2006 and 2009. He captained Gençlerbirliği between 2009 and 2011.

After Şam's successful season in 2010–11, he was transferred to Turkish champions Fenerbahçe for €3.5 on a four-year deal. Orhan get applause for his fight in Fenerbahçe. He played 20 matches in Fenerbahçe.
