= Henri Bienvenu =

Cameroonian footballer (born 1988)

Henri Bienvenu Ntsama
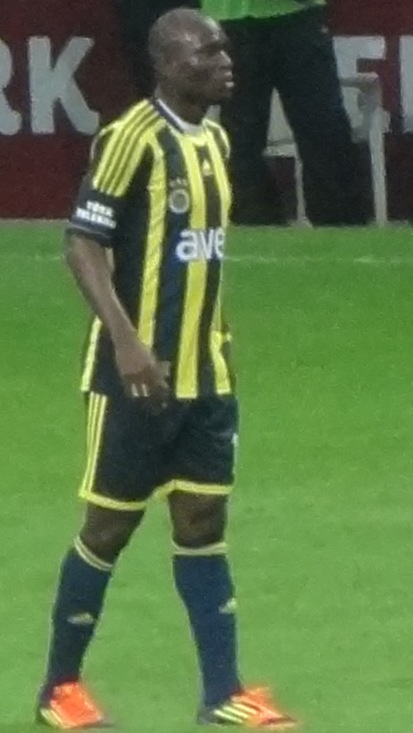

Personal information
- Full name: Henri Bienvenu Ntsama
- Date of birth: 5 July 1988 (age 38)
- Place of birth: Garoua, Cameroon
- Height: 1.80 m (5 ft 11 in)
- Position: Striker

Youth career
- Ecole de Football

Senior career*
Years	Team	Apps	(Gls)
2003–2005	Coton Sport		
2006–2007	CA Bizertin		
2008–2009	Espérance	40	(13)
2010–2011	Young Boys	55	(21)
2011–2013	Fenerbahçe	38	(8)
2013	→ Zaragoza (loan)	9	(0)
2013–2014	Eskişehirspor	27	(5)
2014–2016	Troyes	33	(5)
2015–2016	Troyes B	16	(6)
2017–2019	Al Urooba		
2019–2020	Métropole Troyenne	10	(1)

International career
2010	Cameroon	3	(0)
- * Club domestic league appearances and goals as of 04:10, 6 September 2026 (UTC)

Henri Bienvenu Ntsama (born 5 July 1988) is a Cameroonian footballer who plays as a striker.

== Career ==
=== CA Bizertin ===
Henri Bienvenu began his professional career in the 2006–07 season at Club Athlétique Bizertin in highest Tunisian League. The following season, he scored seven goals.

=== Espérance ===
In January 2008, Bienvenu moved to league rivals Espérance Sportive de Tunis. In the 2008–09 season, he completed 21 games for the club scoring 6 goals and won the Tunisian Ligue 1 with Espérance.Winning a North African Champions Cup, Tunisian National Cup. After the following season, during which he played 11 league games for the club, he left in January 2010.

=== Young Boys ===
In January 2010, Bienvenu joined Swiss club BSC Young Boys signing a contract until the summer of 2013. On 7 February, he made his debut for the club in the away game against FC Basel, being substituted on for fellow striker Matar Coly in the 72nd minute. Bienvenu played a total of 55 games in the Axpo Super League scoring 21 goals. Almost qualifying BSC Young Boys for champions league after scoring the winning goal against Fenerbaçe but unfortunately lost to Tottenham in London gave him a ticket to join Fenerbaçe.

=== Fenerbahçe ===
In September 2011, Bienvenu moved to Fenerbahçe in Turkey signing a four-year contract worth €4 million. The transfer fee paid was €4 million.

He ended a long-lasting scoring drought on 16 September 2011 scoring in 3–1 win against Gaziantepspor. After a difficult time in Fenerbahçe, he was loaned to Real Zaragoza in Spanish La Liga in January 2013. As the club failed to avoid relegation, he returned to Fenerbahçe.

=== Eskişehirspor ===
Bienvenu joined Eskişehirspor in Turkey, where he scored 10 goals in the Süper Lig and reached the final of the Turkish Cup, losing against Galatasaray.

=== Troyes ===
Bienvenu left Eskişehirspor during the summer, and signed for Troyes AC in September 2014. He scored his first goal for the club on 20 September 2014, in a 3–2 away defeat against Le Havre.

== Career statistics ==
As of 7 June 2017

Appearances and goals by club, season and competition
Club	Season	League			Cup (Note: Includes Swiss Cup, Turkish Cup, Coupe de France, Coupe de la Ligue)		Europe (Note: Includes UEFA Cup)		Total	
Club	Season	Division	Apps	Goals	Apps	Goals	Apps	Goals	Apps	Goals
CA Bizertin	2006–07	Tunisian Ligue 1								
CA Bizertin	2007–08	Tunisian Ligue 1								
CA Bizertin	Total									
Espérance	2007–08	Tunisian Ligue 1	8	1					8+	1+
Espérance	2008–09	Tunisian Ligue 1	21	6					21+	6+
Espérance	2009–10	Tunisian Ligue 1	11	6					11+	6+
Espérance	Total		40	13					40+	13+
Young Boys	2009–10	Swiss Super League	15	5	—		—		15	5
Young Boys	2010–11	Swiss Super League	34	16	2	3	10	3	46	22
Young Boys	2011–12	Swiss Super League	6	0	—		4	1	10	1
Young Boys	Total		55	21	2	3	14	4	71	28
Fenerbahçe	2011–12	Süper Lig	36	8	3	4	—		39	12
Fenerbahçe	2012–13	Süper Lig	2	0	—		3	0	5	0
Fenerbahçe	Total		38	8	3	4	3	0	44	12
Real Zaragoza (loan)	2012–13	La Liga	5	0	—		—		5	0
Eskişehirspor	2013–14	Süper Lig	27	5	9	5	—		36	10
Troyes	2014–15	Ligue 2	26	5	1	0	—		27	5
Troyes	2015–16	Ligue 1	7	0	1	0	—		8	0
Troyes	Total		33	5	2	0	0	0	35	5
Career total			198+	52+	16+	12+	17+	4+	231+	68+

== Honours ==
=== Clubs ===
Espérance Sportive de Tunis

- Tunisian President Cup: 2008
- Tunisian Ligue Professionnelle 1: 2008–2009
- North African Cup: 2009
- Arab Champions League: 2009

Fenerbahçe

- Türkiye Kupası: 2011–12

Troyes

- Ligue 2: 2014–15
