= Murat Öztürk (footballer) =

Turkish footballer and coach

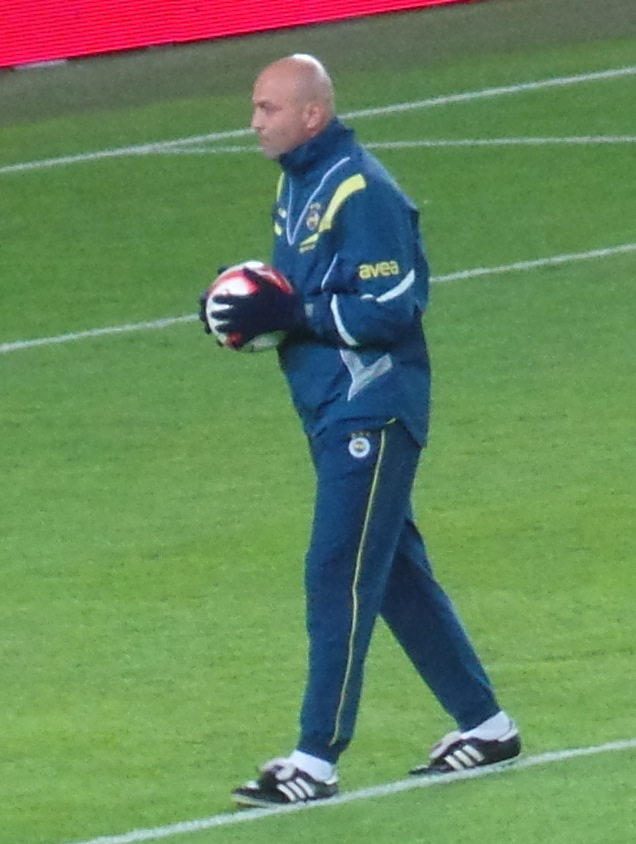
Murat Öztürk

Murat Öztürk (born 5 December 1969 in Sivas) is a Turkish football coach and former goalkeeper. He started his professional football career with Gençlerbirliği. He is currently the Goalkeeper Coach of İstanbul Başakşehir.

He earned a goalkeeper coaching licence in 2003. He has been working for İstanbul Başakşehir since 1 February 2021.
