= Serdar Kesimal =

Turkish footballer

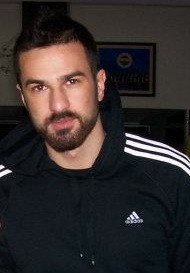

Personal information
- Full name: Serdar Kesimal
- Date of birth: 24 January 1989 (age 37)
- Place of birth: Wuppertal, West Germany
- Height: 1.86 m (6 ft 1 in)
- Position: Centre back

Youth career
- –2006: Sportfreunde Dönberg
- 2006–2007: Wuppertaler SV
- 2007–2009: 1. FC Köln

Senior career*
Years	Team	Apps	(Gls)
2008–2009	1. FC Köln II	20	(0)
2009–2011	Kayserispor	55	(2)
2011–2016	Fenerbahçe	32	(0)
2016–2017	Akhisar Belediyespor	8	(0)

International career^{‡}
2008	Turkey U20	2	(0)
2009–2010	Turkey U21	15	(0)
2010–2011	Turkey	6	(0)
- * Club domestic league appearances and goals as of 17:45, 18 January 2013 (UTC) ‡ National team caps and goals as of 17 October 2011

Serdar Kesimal (born 24 January 1989) is a Turkish footballer who plays as a centre back. Kesimal is also a youth international, having been capped at the U-20 and U-21 levels.

== Early years ==
Kesimal was born in Wuppertal on 24 January 1989 to emigrants of Rize. He began his footballing career with amateur club FC Dönberg. He spent some time with Wuppertaler SV before being transferred to FC Köln in 2007. Kesimal played in the U-19 and II teams of.

== Career ==
FC Köln before Kayserispor transferred him in 2009. He scored his first goal for the club in a match against MKE Ankaragücü on 24 August 2010. He made his debut in the 1-0 friendly beat by the Netherlands on November 10, 2010. And he made his debut as an official in 2-0 victory over Austria on March 29, 2011. Kesimal was transferred to Turkish champions Fenerbahçe for Gökhan Ünal plus a fee worth €5 million on a 5-year contract. Following a three-month injury period he returned to the team and quickly gained a starter position in December, 2011. He retired from playing in 2017, as a member of Akhisar Belediye.

== International career ==
Kesimal began his international career with the Turkey U-21 squad. Kesimal was never capped at youth international level. He made his debut against Netherlands on 17 November 2010.
