= 2009–10 Fenerbahçe S.K. season =

Fenerbahçe
2009–10 season
- President: Aziz Yıldırım
- Head coach: Christoph Daum
- Stadium: Şükrü Saracoğlu Stadium
- Süper Lig: 2nd
- Turkish Cup: Runners-up
- UEFA Europa League: Round of 32
- Turkish Super Cup: Winners
- Top goalscorer: League: Alex; Dani Güiza (11 each); All: Alex (21 goals)
Home colours	Away colours	Third colours

The 2009–10 Fenerbahçe S.K. season was the club's 103rd season in its history and its 52nd consecutive year in the Süper Lig since its establishment. The season covered a period from July 2009 to June 2010. Having finished fourth in the Süper Lig the previous season, Fenerbahçe qualified for the rebranded UEFA Europa League third qualifying round and for the group stage of the rebranded Turkish Cup, the Ziraat Turkish Cup.

== Previous season positions ==
The club competed in the 2008–09 Süper Lig, 2008–09 Turkish Cup in domestic and 2008–09 UEFA Champions League in European competitions. Fenerbahçe progressed past Hungarian side MTK Hungária in the second qualifying round, then defeated Serbian club Partizan in the third qualifying round to advance to the group stage. Fenerbahçe performed poorly in the group stage, gaining only two points from six matches and finishing last in Group G.

	Competition	Position
(European Union)	UEFA Champions League	Group stage
(Turkey)	Süper Lig	4th
(Turkey)	Turkish Cup	Runners-up

== Team information ==
=== Club board ===
President	(Turkey) Aziz Yıldırım
Deputy-president/Press Spokesman	(Turkey) Nihat Özdemir
Secretary general	(Turkey) Vedat Olcay
Vice-president/Member	(Turkey) Ali Koç
Vice-president, Financial and Project	(Turkey) Nihat Özbağı
Member	(Turkey) Alaeddin Yıldırım
Vice-president/Member	(Turkey) Osman Murat Özaydınlı
Vice-president, Social Organisations & Associations	(Turkey) Mithat Yenigün
Vice-president, Amateur Departments	(Turkey) Mahmut Nedim Uslu
Vice-president, Formal Association Relations	(Turkey) Serhat Çeçen
Vice-president, Law & Institutional Relations	(Turkey) Şekip Mosturoğlu
Football and Stadium Infrastructure	(Turkey) Ömer Temelli
Social Organisations	(Turkey) Ünal Uzun
Fenerbahçe Training Company	(Turkey) Turan Şahin

Source: Board of Directors

=== Staffs ===
==== Technical staff ====
Name	Role
(Germany) Christoph Daum	Head coach
(Germany) Roland Koch	Head coach Assistant
(Germany) Ayhan Tumani	Assistant coach & Interpreter
(Turkey) Irfan Saraloğlu	Assistant coach
(Turkey) Dolu Arslan	Individual Player Coach
(Germany) Holger Gehrke	Goalkeeper coach
(Turkey) Murat Öztürk	Goalkeeper coach
(Germany) Marcel Daum	Technic Analyst

==== Medical staff ====
Name	Role
(Turkey) Ertuğrul Karanlık	Club doctor
(Germany) Michael Schulten	Physiotherapist
(Turkey) Orhan Şakir	Physiotherapist
(Turkey) Kamuran Bozan	Masseur
(Turkey) Yılmaz Mete	Masseur
(Turkey) Özkan Alaca	Masseur

==== Administrative staff ====
Name	Role
(Turkey) Aykut Kocaman	Soccer Branch Sports Director
(Turkey) Hasan Çetinkaya	Administrative Manager
(Turkey) Samet Güzel	Interpreter
(Turkey) Umut Köse	Interpreter
(Turkey) Gökhan Demirer	Information Processes
(Turkey) Mahmut Sökün	Information Processes
(Turkey) Mehmet Çatay	Media Officer

Source: fenerbahce.org

== Squad ==
=== Starting XI ===
4–2–3–1 Formation

=== First-team squad ===
Note: Flags indicate national team as defined under FIFA eligibility rules; some limited exceptions apply. Players may hold more than one non-FIFA nationality.

No.	Pos.	Nation	Player
1	GK	TUR	Volkan Demirel
2	DF	URU	Diego Lugano
5	MF	TUR	Emre Belözoğlu (2nd vice captain)
6	DF	BRA	Gökçek Vederson
8	FW	TUR	Colin Kazim-Richards (on loan)
9	FW	ESP	Dani Güiza
10	MF	BRA	Alex (Captain)
15	DF	TUR	Bekir İrtegün
16	MF	BRA	Cristian
17	MF	TUR	Ali Bilgin
18	MF	TUR	Abdülkadir Kayalı (on loan)
19	DF	TUR	Önder Turacı
20	MF	TUR	Özer Hurmacı
21	MF	TUR	Selçuk Şahin

No.	Pos.	Nation	Player
22	GK	TUR	Mahmut Ertuğrul Taşkıran
23	FW	TUR	Semih Şentürk (Vice captain)
24	MF	TUR	Deniz Barış
25	MF	TUR	Uğur Boral
27	DF	BRA	André Santos
34	GK	TUR	Mert Günok
39	FW	TUR	Gökhan Ünal
54	FW	TUR	Furkan Aydın
58	DF	BRA	Fábio Bilica
66	MF	TUR	Mehmet Topuz
67	FW	TUR	Onur Karakabak (on loan)
77	DF	TUR	Gökhan Gönül
88	GK	TUR	Volkan Babacan
99	FW	BRA	Deivid

Source: fenerbahçe.org and tff.org

== Transfers ==
=== In ===
Date	Pos.	Name	From	Fee
8 July 2009	DF	(Brazil) Fábio Bilica	(Turkey) Sivasspor	Undisclosed
13 June 2009	MF	(Turkey) Mehmet Topuz	(Turkey) Kayserispor	Undisclosed
22 June 2009	MF	(Turkey) Özer Hurmacı	(Turkey) Ankaraspor	Undisclosed
24 June 2009	DF	(Turkey) Bekir İrtegün	(Turkey) Gaziantepspor	Undisclosed
21 July 2009	DF	(Brazil) André Santos	(Brazil) Corinthians	Undisclosed
21 July 2009	MF	(Brazil) Cristian	(Brazil) Corinthians	Undisclosed
17 January 2010	FW	(Turkey) Gökhan Ünal	(Turkey) Trabzonspor	Undisclosed

=== Out ===
Date	Pos.	Name	To	Fee
6 July 2009	FW	(Turkey) Umut Güzelses	(Turkey) Hacettepe	Undisclosed
8 July 2009	FW	(Turkey) İlhan Parlak	(Turkey) Ankaraspor	Exchanged
8 July 2009	DF	(Turkey) Özgür Çek	(Turkey) Ankaraspor	Exchanged
11 July 2009	MF	(Turkey) Burak Yılmaz	(Turkey) Antalyaspor	Free Agent
11 July 2009	MF	(Turkey) Gürhan Gürsoy	(Turkey) Antalyaspor	Undisclosed
12 July 2009	DF	(Turkey) Can Arat	(Turkey) İstanbul BŞB	Undisclosed
12 July 2009	MF	(Turkey) Gökhan Emreciksin	(Turkey) Kayserispor	Exchanged
12 July 2009	DF	(Turkey) Yasin Çakmak	(Turkey) Sivasspor	Exchanged
12 July 2009	MF	(Spain) Josico	(Spain) Las Palmas	Free Agent
12 July 2009	MF	(Chile) Claudio Maldonado	(Brazil) Flamengo	Free Agent
4 January 2010	DF	(Brazil) Roberto Carlos	(Brazil) Corinthians	Free Agent
15 January 2010	FW	(Turkey) Burak Yılmaz	(Turkey) Trabzonspor	Exchanged
21 January 2010	FW	(Turkey) Colin Kazim-Richards	(France) Toulouse	Loan

=== Out on loan ===
Date From	Date To	Pos.	Name	Moving To
4 January 2010	31 May 2011	MF	(Turkey) Abdülkadir Kayalı	(Turkey) İstanbul BŞB
1 February 2010	31 May 2011	FW	(Turkey) Onur Karakabak	(Turkey) Mersin İdmanyurdu
21 January 2010	31 May 2010	FW	(Turkey) Colin Kazim-Richards	(France) Toulouse

== Squad statistics ==
No.	Pos.	Name	League		Turkish Super Cup		Turkish Cup		Europe		Total		Discipline	
No.	Pos.	Name	Apps	Goals	Apps	Goals	Apps	Goals	Apps	Goals	Apps	Goals	Yellow card	Red card
1	GK	(Turkey) Volkan Demirel	32	0	1	0	0	0	0	0	0	0	2	0
2	DF	(Uruguay) Diego Lugano	25	3	0	0	0	0	0	0	0	0	6	1
5	MF	(Turkey) Emre Belözoğlu	25	1	1	0	0	0	0	0	0	0	8	0
6	DF	(Turkey) Gökçek Vederson	28	1	1	0	0	0	0	0	0	0	1	1
9	FW	(Spain) Dani Güiza	27	11	1	0	0	0	0	0	0	0	5	0
10	MF	(Brazil) Alex	26	11	1	2	0	0	0	0	0	0	5	1
15	DF	(Turkey) Bekir İrtegün	7	1	0	0	0	0	0	0	0	0	2	0
16	MF	(Brazil) Cristian	24	3	1	0	0	0	0	0	0	0	5	0
17	MF	(Turkey) Ali Bilgin	1	0	0	0	0	0	0	0	0	0	0	0
19	DF	(Turkey) Önder Turacı	9	0	1	0	0	0	0	0	0	0	1	0
20	MF	(Turkey) Özer Hurmacı	21	2	0	0	0	0	0	0	0	0	1	0
21	MF	(Turkey) Selçuk Şahin	21	1	1	0	0	0	0	0	0	0	3	0
22	GK	(Turkey) Ertuğrul Taşkıran	0	0	0	0	0	0	0	0	0	0	0	0
23	FW	(Turkey) Semih Şentürk	21	6	0	0	0	0	0	0	0	0	1	0
24	MF	(Turkey) Deniz Barış	14	0	0	0	0	0	0	0	0	0	1	0
25	MF	(Turkey) Uğur Boral	5	2	1	0	0	0	0	0	0	0	0	0
27	DF	(Brazil) André Santos	27	5	1	0	0	0	0	0	0	0	5	0
34	GK	(Turkey) Mert Günok	0	0	0	0	0	0	0	0	0	0	0	0
39	FW	(Turkey) Gökhan Ünal	10	2	0	0	0	0	0	0	0	0	1	0
54	FW	(Turkey) Furkan Aydın	0	0	0	0	0	0	0	0	0	0	0	0
58	DF	(Brazil) Bilica	28	0	1	0	0	0	0	0	0	0	6	0
66	MF	(Turkey) Mehmet Topuz	28	1	0	0	0	0	0	0	0	0	2	1
77	DF	(Turkey) Gökhan Gönül	30	2	1	0	0	0	0	0	0	0	5	0
88	GK	(Turkey) Volkan Babacan	0	0	0	0	0	0	0	0	0	0	0	0
99	FW	(Brazil) Deivid	13	0	1	0	0	0	0	0	0	0	0	0
Players sold or loaned out after the start of the season
3	DF	(Brazil) Roberto Carlos	11	0	0	0	0	0	0	0	0	0	4	0
8	FW	(Turkey) Colin Kazim-Richards	11	3	1	0	0	0	0	0	0	0	5	1
18	MF	(Turkey) Abdülkadir Kayalı	0	0	0	0	0	0	0	0	0	0	0	0
67	FW	(Turkey) Onur Karakabak	0	0	0	0	0	0	0	0	0	0	0	0

== Matches ==
=== Süper Lig ===
Fenerbahçe played their 52nd consecutive season in the league. They competed with 17 other teams.

==== Standings ====
Pos	Team	Pld	W	D	L	GF	GA	GD	Pts	Qualification or relegation
1	Bursaspor (C)	34	23	6	5	65	26	+39	75	Qualification to Champions League group stage
2	Fenerbahçe	34	23	5	6	61	28	+33	74	Qualification to Champions League third qualifying round
3	Galatasaray	34	19	7	8	61	35	+26	64 (Note: Galatasaray finished ahead of Beşiktaş on head-to-head record: Galatasaray–Beşiktaş 3–0, Beşiktaş–Galatasaray 1–1.)	Qualification to Europa League third qualifying round
4	Beşiktaş	34	18	10	6	47	25	+22	64	Qualification to Europa League second qualifying round
5	Trabzonspor	34	16	9	9	53	32	+21	57	Qualification to Europa League play-off round (Note: Trabzonspor won the 2009–10 Turkish Cup and thus qualified for the play-off round of the UEFA Europa League.)

Source: Süper Lig official website
Rules for classification: 1st overall points, 2nd head-to-head points, 3rd head-to-head goal differential, 4th overall goal differential, 5th overall goals scored.
(C) Champions

==== Results summary ====
Overall								Home						Away					
Pld	W	D	L	GF	GA	GD	Pts	W	D	L	GF	GA	GD	W	D	L	GF	GA	GD
34	23	5	6	61	28	+33	74	13	2	2	33	13	+20	10	3	4	28	15	+13

Source: Competition Matches

==== Results by round ====
Round	1	2	3	4	5	6	7	8	9	10	11	12	13	14	15	16	17	18	19	20	21	22	23	24	25	26	27	28	29	30	31	32	33	34
Ground	A	H	A	H	A	H	A	H	A	H	A	H	A	H	A	H	A	H	A	H	A	H	A	H	A	H	A	H	A	H	A	H	A	H
Result	W	W	W	W	W	W	W	W	L	W	D	W	L	L	L	W	W	W	W	D	D	L	L	W	D	W	W	W	W	W	W	W	W	D
Position	2	1	2	2	2	2	1	1	1	1	1	1	1	1	2	2	1	1	1	1	2	3	3	3	4	3	2	2	2	2	1	1	1	2

Updated to match(es) played on 9 May. Source: Competition Matches
A = Away; H = Home; W = Win; D = Draw; L = Loss

==== Results ====
All times at EET

9 August 2009 1	Denizlispor	0–2	Fenerbahçe	Denizli
21:45	Angelov (yellow card) 15'; Chrysostome (yellow card) 82'	Report	Güiza 1', 87'; Cristian (yellow card) 44'; Turacı (yellow card) 89'	Stadium: Denizli Atatürk Stadium; Referee: Bülent Yıldırım

16 August 2009 2	Fenerbahçe	3–0	Sivasspor	Istanbul
21:00	Kazim-Richards 70', (yellow card) 70'; Belözoğlu 81'; Santos 89'	Report	Petković (yellow card) 44'	Stadium: Şükrü Saracoğlu Stadium; Referee: Mustafa Kâmil Abitoğlu

24 August 2009 3	Diyarbakırspor	1–3	Fenerbahçe	Diyarbakır
21:00	Tazemeta (yellow card) 9', (goal) 20'; Doğantez (yellow card) 39'; E. Şentürk (yellow card) 82'	Report	Belözoğlu (yellow card) 7'; Kazim-Richards (yellow card) 10', (goal) 55'; Gönül 36'; Santos (yellow card) 48'; Güiza (yellow card) 55'; S. Şentürk 69' (pen.)	Stadium: Diyarbakır Atatürk Stadium; Referee: Suat Arslanboğa

30 August 2009 4	Fenerbahçe	2–1	Manisaspor	Istanbul
21:00	İrtegün (yellow card) 33'; Belözoğlu (red card) 75'; Güiza 79', (yellow card) 79'; Cristian (yellow card) 86'; Şentürk 90'	Report	Keleş (yellow card) 13', (goal) 86'; Aydın (yellow card) 20'; Simpson (yellow card) 41'; Çalışkan (yellow card) 56'; İncedemir (yellow card) 89'	Stadium: Şükrü Saracoğlu Stadium; Referee: Tolga Özkalfa

13 September 2009 5	Bursaspor	0–1	Fenerbahçe	Bursa
21:00	İpek (yellow card) 61'; Yıldırım (yellow card) 89'	Report	Lugano (yellow card) 22'; Alex (yellow card) 25', (goal) 42'; Güiza (yellow card) 25'; Kazim-Richards (yellow card) 32'; Gönül (yellow card) 67'; Santos (yellow card) 70'	Stadium: Bursa Atatürk Stadium; Referee: Deniz Çoban

20 September 2009 6	Fenerbahçe	1–0	İstanbul BŞB	Istanbul
21:00	Vederson 33'; Bilica (yellow card) 53'; Alex (yellow card) 89'	Report	Tum (yellow card) 72'; Buruk (yellow card) 80'; Depe (yellow card) 80'	Stadium: Şükrü Saracoğlu Stadium; Referee: Hüseyin Göçek

26 September 2009 7	Antalyaspor	1–2	Fenerbahçe	Antalya
20:00	Zitouni 21'; Ayhan (yellow card) 33'; Özmert (yellow card) 46'; Arslan (yellow card) 58'	Report	Kazim-Richards 10', (yellow card) 17'; Bilica (yellow card) 33'; Gönül (yellow card) 38'; Şentürk 89'	Stadium: Antalya Atatürk Stadium; Referee: Yunus Yıldırım

4 October 2009 8	Fenerbahçe	3–0	Gençlerbirliği	Istanbul
20:00	Alex 13', 71', (yellow card) 59'; Lugano (yellow card) 23', (goal) 89'; Gönül (yellow card) 57'; Cristian (yellow card) 63'	Report	Eker (yellow card) 55'; Tozo (yellow card) 89'	Stadium: Şükrü Saracoğlu Stadium; Referee: Kuddusi Müftüoğlu

18 October 2009 9	Gaziantepspor	2–1	Fenerbahçe	Gaziantep
16:00	Júlio César Santos Correa (yellow card) 35'; Júlio César da Silva e Souza (yellow card) 40', (goal) 84', 90'	Report	Şentürk 25'; Roberto Carlos (yellow card) 56'	Stadium: Gaziantep Kamil Ocak Stadium; Referee: Bülent Yıldırım

25 October 2009 10	Fenerbahçe	3–1	Galatasaray	Istanbul
20:00	Alex 13', 55' (pen.); Roberto Carlos (yellow card) 75'; Güiza 89'	Report	Franco (yellow card) 54'; Balta 58'; Nonda (yellow card) 61'; Keïta (red card) 75'; Akman (yellow card) 86'	Stadium: Şükrü Saracoğlu Stadium; Referee: Bünyamin Gezer

1 November 2009 11	Kayserispor	1–1	Fenerbahçe	Kayseri
20:00	Cángele 70' (pen.)	Report	Cristian 20'; Kazim-Richards (yellow card) 56'; Roberto Carlos (yellow card) 69'; Belözoğlu (yellow card) 89'	Stadium: Kadir Has Stadium; Referee: Tolga Özkalfa

12	Fenerbahçe	3–0^{1}	Ankaraspor	Istanbul
-	-	-	-	Stadium: Şükrü Saracoğlu Stadium; Referee: -

21 November 2009 13	Beşiktaş	3–0	Fenerbahçe	Istanbul
20:00	Ferrari (yellow card) 44'; Fink 53'; Bobô 57'; İnceman 82'	Report	Lugano (yellow card) 37'; Belözoğlu (yellow card) 53'; Kazim-Richards (red card) 76'	Stadium: Inönü Stadium; Referee: Fırat Aydınus

28 November 2009 14	Fenerbahçe	1–3	Kasımpaşa	Istanbul
20:00	Güiza 5'	Report	Güleç 1', (yellow card) 55'; İşler 48'; Keller (yellow card) 73'; Aygüneş 81'; Avcı (yellow card) 83'	Stadium: Şükrü Saracoğlu Stadium; Referee: Hüseyin Göçek

5 December 2009 15	Eskişehirspor	2–1	Fenerbahçe	Eskişehir
20:00	Ertoğrul (yellow card) 35'; A. Sarı 65', 78'; Başdağ (yellow card) 80'; V. Sarı (yellow card) 88'; El Saka (yellow card) 89'	Report	Şahin (yellow card) 44'; Lugano 89'	Stadium: Eskişehir Atatürk Stadium; Referee: Mustafa Kâmil Abitoğlu

12 December 2009 16	Fenerbahçe	3–2	Ankaragücü	Istanbul
20:00	Alex 27', 60'; Roberto Carlos (yellow card) 49'; Güiza 88'; Barış (yellow card) 90'	Report	Süme (yellow card) 3'; Vassell 37'; Karabulut 49'; Güçer (yellow card) 60'	Stadium: Şükrü Saracoğlu Stadium; Referee: Halis Özkahya

20 December 2009 17	Trabzonspor	0–1	Fenerbahçe	Trabzon
20:00	Korkmaz (yellow card) 77'	Report	Alex (yellow card) 40'; Gönül (yellow card) 53'; Güiza 56'; Santos (yellow card) 44'	Stadium: Hüseyin Avni Aker Stadium; Referee: Bülent Yıldırım

22 January 2010 18	Fenerbahçe	3–1	Denizlispor	Istanbul
20:00	Lugano (yellow card) 52'; Belözoğlu (yellow card) 54'; Lugano (yellow card) 52'; Santos (yellow card) 77', Cristian (yellow card) 73'; Hurmacı 86', (yellow card) 86'; Güiza 89'	Report	Bajić (yellow card) 16'; Cebe (yellow card) 43'; Braga (yellow card) 47'; Berberović (yellow card) 71'; Youla 82'; Öngün (yellow card) 86'	Stadium: Şükrü Saracoğlu Stadium; Referee: Bünyamin Gezer

31 January 2010 19	Sivasspor	1–5	Fenerbahçe	Sivas
15:00	Yıldız 37'	Report	Şentürk (yellow card) 27', (goal) 30', 55'; Boral 67', 70'; Gönül 84'	Stadium: Sivas 4 Eylül Stadium; Referee: Kuddusi Müftüoğlu

7 February 2010 20	Fenerbahçe	1–1	Diyarbakırspor	Istanbul
19:00	Bilica (yellow card) 26'; Belözoğlu (yellow card) 87'; Güiza (yellow card) 88'; Santos 88'; Topuz (red card) 89'	Report	Bebbe (yellow card) 22'; Abdelaziz 82'; Ataş (yellow card) 89'	Stadium: Şükrü Saracoğlu Stadium; Referee: Koray Gençerler

14 February 2010 21	Manisaspor	2–2	Fenerbahçe	Manisa
19:00	Promise 44', 86'; Aydın (yellow card) 48'; İncedemir (yellow card) 82'	Report	Cristian 12'; Ünal 89'	Stadium: Manisa 19 Mayis Stadium; Referee: Mustafa Kâmil Abitoğlu

22 February 2010 22	Fenerbahçe	2–3	Bursaspor	Istanbul
20:00	Alex 5', (yellow card) 46'; Santos 21'	Report	Batalla 26'; Keçeli (yellow card) 73'; İpek 83', 90'	Stadium: Şükrü Saracoğlu Stadium; Referee: Bülent Yıldırım

28 February 2010 23	İstanbul BŞB	2–1	Fenerbahçe	Istanbul
15:00	Alın 29', 83'; İnanç (yellow card) 52'; Ekşioğlu (yellow card) 69'; Gülpınar (yellow card) 89'	Report	Alex 56', (red card) 79'	Stadium: Atatürk Olympic Stadium; Referee: Fırat Aydınus

7 March 2010 24	Fenerbahçe	1–0	Antalyaspor	Istanbul
19:00	Santos (yellow card) 23', (goal) 32'; Vederson (yellow card) 25'	Report	Güven (yellow card) 42'; Batak (yellow card) 80'	Stadium: Şükrü Saracoğlu Stadium; Referee: Bünyamin Gezer

13 March 2010 25	Gençlerbirliği	0–0	Fenerbahçe	Ankara
19:00	Demir (yellow card) 37'; Şam (yellow card) 44'; Harbuzi (yellow card) 64'	Report	Belözoğlu (yellow card) 74'	Stadium: Ankara 19 Mayıs Stadium; Referee: Mustafa Kâmil Abitoğlu

20 March 2010 26	Fenerbahçe	1–0	Gaziantepspor	Istanbul
19:00	Güiza 32'; Belözoğlu (yellow card) 41'; Lugano (yellow card) 61'	Report	Zurita (yellow card) 62'; Ceylan (yellow card) 88'	Stadium: Şükrü Saracoğlu Stadium; Referee: Kuddusi Müftüoğlu

28 March 2010 27	Galatasaray	0–1	Fenerbahçe	Istanbul
19:00	Topal (yellow card) 14'; Erkin (yellow card) 65'; Baroš (yellow card) 80'	Report	Topuz (yellow card) 38'; Şahin 70'; Demirel (yellow card) 80'	Stadium: Ali Sami Yen Stadium; Referee: Cüneyt Çakır

4 April 2010 28	Fenerbahçe	2–0	Kayserispor	Istanbul
19:00	Ünal 32'; Lugano 47'; Topuz (yellow card) 62'	Report	Makukula (yellow card) 44'; Kesimal (yellow card) 74'; Saidou (yellow card) 82'	Stadium: Şükrü Saracoğlu Stadium; Referee: Yunus Yıldırım

29	Ankaraspor	0–3^{1}	Fenerbahçe	Ankara
-	-	-	-	Stadium: Yenikent Asaş Stadium; Referee: -

18 April 2010 30	Fenerbahçe	1–0	Beşiktaş	Istanbul
19:00	Alex 2'; Şahin (yellow card) 17'; Bilica (yellow card) 65'; Demirel (yellow card) 66'; Gönül (yellow card) 78'; Vederson (red card) 90'	Report	Köybaşı (yellow card) 19'; Bobô (yellow card) 41'; Sivok (yellow card) 85'; Ernst (red card) 87'; Toraman (red card) 90'; Reçber (yellow card) 90'	Stadium: Şükrü Saracoğlu Stadium; Referee: Hüseyin Göçek

25 April 2010 31	Kasımpaşa	0–1	Fenerbahçe	Istanbul
15:00	Teber (yellow card) 62'	Report	Şahin (yellow card) 55'; İrtegün (yellow card) 63', (goal) 76'; Ünal (yellow card) 89'	Stadium: Recep Tayyip Erdoğan Stadium; Referee: Cüneyt Çakır

1 May 2010 32	Fenerbahçe	2–0	Eskişehirspor	Istanbul
20:00	Alex 13'; Hurmacı 23'; Güiza (yellow card) 40'	Report	Arslan (yellow card) 31'; A. Sarı (yellow card) 84'	Stadium: Şükrü Saracoğlu Stadium; Referee: Bülent Yıldırım

9 May 2010 33	Ankaragücü	0–3	Fenerbahçe	Ankara
20:00	Rothen (yellow card) 47'; Yoldaş (yellow card) 61'	Report	Topuz 23'; Lugano (yellow card) 43'; Güiza 47'; Cristian 67', (yellow card) 67'	Stadium: Ankara 19 Mayıs Stadium; Referee: Kuddusi Müftüoğlu

16 May 2010 34	Fenerbahçe	1–1	Trabzonspor	Istanbul
20:00	Güiza 14'; Bilica (yellow card) 75'	Report	Yılmaz 23'; Colman (yellow card) 36'; Kaçar (yellow card) 88'	Stadium: Şükrü Saracoğlu Stadium; Referee: Yunus Yıldırım

^{1} See Ankaraspor Relegation
Source: tff.org

=== Turkish Super Cup ===
All times at EET

2 August 2009 Final	Beşiktaş	0–2	Fenerbahçe	Istanbul
21:00	Şimşek (yellow card) 34'; Bobô (yellow card) 52'; Sivok (yellow card) 74'	Report	Bilica (yellow card) 52'; Alex 74' (pen.), 89'	Stadium: Atatürk Olympic Stadium; Referee: Yunus Yıldırım

Source: tff.org

=== Ziraat Turkish Cup ===
Fenerbahçe participated in the 48th Turkish Cup starting in the group stages. Fenerbahçe completed the group stage. First Fenerbahçe matched with Bursaspor in quarterfinals. They won Bursaspor aggregate, 4–3. Then Fenerbahçe matched with Manisaspor in semifinals. They won Manisaspor aggregate, 3–1. Finally Fenerbahçe matched with Trabzonspor. They lost Trabzonspor 3-1 and had farewell the cup. All times at EET

==== Group stage ====
Pos	Team	Pld	W	D	L	GF	GA	GD	Pts
1	Fenerbahçe	4	3	0	1	10	6	+4	9
2	Antalyaspor	4	2	2	0	6	4	+2	8
3	Tokatspor	4	1	1	2	6	7	−1	4
4	Altay	4	1	1	2	2	9	−7	4
5	Eskişehirspor	4	1	0	3	6	4	+2	3

Source: tff.org (in Turkish)
Rules for classification: 1) points; 2) goal difference; 3) number of goals scored.

23 December 2009 1	Fenerbahçe	3–0	Altay	Istanbul
18:30	Hurmacı 35', 78'; Topuz 57'	Report	Alkıliıç (yellow card) 87'	Stadium: Şükrü Saracoğlu Stadium; Referee: Özgüç Türkalp

10 January 2010 2	Eskişehirspor	0–1	Fenerbahçe	Eskişehir
20:30	Kaya (yellow card) 42'; Iveša (yellow card) 58'; Zengin (yellow card) 74'	Report	Alex 59' (pen.); Vederson (yellow card) 86'; Lugano (yellow card) 89'	Stadium: Eskişehir Atatürk Stadium; Referee: Cüneyt Çakır

13 January 2010 3	Fenerbahçe	3–2	Tokatspor	Istanbul
20:30	Alex 25'; Topuz 48'; Güiza 56'; Bilica (yellow card) 86'; Vederson (yellow card) 89'	Report	Çoban 19'; Boz 50'; Gökçe (yellow card) 73'	Stadium: Şükrü Saracoğlu Stadium; Referee: Abdullah Yılmaz

18 January 2010 4	Antalyaspor	4–3	Fenerbahçe	Manisa
20:30	Ayhan 21', (yellow card) 25'; Ateş 50'; Djiehoua 65', 88', (yellow card) 88'; Jedinak (yellow card) 89'; Ak (yellow card) 90'	Report	Alex 17'; İrtegün (yellow card) 68'; Hurmacı 72'; Güiza 80'	Stadium: Antalya Atatürk Stadium; Referee: Özgür Yankaya

==== Quarter-finals ====
4 February 2010 First leg	Fenerbahçe	3–0	Bursaspor	Istanbul
20:00	Santos 22'; Lugano 25'; Şentürk 40'; Lugano (yellow card) 58'	Report	Has (yellow card) 49'; Keçeli (yellow card) 66'	Stadium: Şükrü Saracoğlu Stadium; Referee: Hüseyin Göçek

11 February 2010 Second leg	Bursaspor	3–1 (3–4 agg.)	Fenerbahçe	Bursa
20:30	Iglesias 18'; Cimşir (yellow card) 25'; Ivankov 32' (pen.), (yellow card) 33'; Bahadır (yellow card) 36' (goal) 64'; Tandoğan (yellow card) 48'	Report	Bilica (yellow card) 30'; Güiza (yellow card) 54', (goal) 90'; Santos (yellow card) 56'	Stadium: Bursa Atatürk Stadium; Referee: Cüneyt Çakır

==== Semi-finals ====
24 March 2010 First leg	Fenerbahçe	2–0	Manisaspor	Istanbul
20:00	Güiza 31'; Deivid 33'	Report		Stadium: Şükrü Saracoğlu Stadium; Referee: Abdullah Yılmaz

13 April 2010 Second leg	Manisaspor	1–1 (1–3 agg.)	Fenerbahçe	Manisa
20:00	Varol 16'; Çalışkan (yellow card) 34'; İncedemir (yellow card) 57'; Gabriel (yellow card) 66'	Report	İrtegün (yellow card) 58'; Alex 65'; Lugano (yellow card) 66'	Stadium: Manisa 19 Mayıs Stadium; Referee: Aytekin Durmaz

==== Final ====
5 May 2010 Final	Trabzonspor	3–1	Fenerbahçe	Şanlıurfa
15:45	Balcı (yellow card) 61'; Bulut 66'; Baytar 80'; Yılmaz (yellow card) 85'; Korkmaz (yellow card) 87'; Kıvrak (yellow card) 90'; Colman 90+3'	Report	Belözoğlu (yellow card) 38'; Alex 55'; Bilica (yellow card) 71'	Stadium: Şanlıurfa GAP Stadium; Referee: Cüneyt Çakır

=== UEFA Europa League ===
All times at CET

==== Third qualifying round ====
30 July 2009 First leg	Fenerbahçe (Turkey)	5–1	(Hungary) Budapest Honvéd	Istanbul, Turkey
20:45	Roberto Carlos 13'; Güiza 30', 40', 61'; Alex 13'	Report	Benjamin (yellow card) 16'; Zsolnai 78'	Stadium: Şükrü Saracoğlu Stadium; Referee: Knut Kircher (Germany)

6 August 2009 Second leg	Budapest Honvéd (Hungary)	1–1 (2–6 agg.)	(Turkey) Fenerbahçe	Budapest, Hungary
20:00	Debreceni (yellow card) 15'; Fritz 86'	Report	Santos 9'; Bilica (red card) 31'	Stadium: Bozsik Stadion; Referee: Paul Allaerts (Belgium)

==== Play-off round ====
20 August 2009 First leg	Sion (Switzerland)	0–2	(Turkey) Fenerbahçe	Geneva, Switzerland
20:30	Paíto (yellow card) 81'	Report	Santos 45'; Cristian (yellow card) 52'; Güiza (yellow card) 68'; Kazim-Richards 85'; Gönül (yellow card) 89'	Stadium: Stade de Genève; Referee: Daniel Stalhammar (Sweden)

27 August 2009 Second leg	Fenerbahçe (Turkey)	2–2 (4–2 agg.)	(Switzerland) Sion	Istanbul, Turkey
20:30	Santos 2', 41' (pen.); Demirel (yellow card) 30'; Lugano (yellow card) 37'	Report	Vanczák 9'; Yusuf (yellow card) 14'; Chihab 31' (pen.); Bühler (yellow card) 40'	Stadium: Şükrü Saracoğlu Stadium; Referee: Bruno Paixão (Portugal)

==== Group stage ====
Pos	Team	Pld	W	D	L	GF	GA	GD	Pts	Qualification
1	(Turkey) Fenerbahçe	6	5	0	1	8	3	+5	15	Advance to knockout phase
2	(Netherlands) Twente	6	2	2	2	5	6	−1	8	Advance to knockout phase
3	(Moldova) Sheriff Tiraspol	6	1	2	3	4	5	−1	5	
4	(Romania) Steaua București	6	0	4	2	3	6	−3	4	

Source: Soccerway

17 September 2009 1	Fenerbahçe (Turkey)	1–2	(Netherlands) Twente	Istanbul, Turkey
21:05	Santos (yellow card) 41'; Topuz 71'	Report	Tioté (yellow card) 29'; Douglas (yellow card) 71'; Nkufo 75', 80'; Kuiper (yellow card) 83'	Stadium: Şükrü Saracoğlu Stadium; Referee: Claudio Circhetta (Switzerland)

1 October 2009 2	Sheriff Tiraspol (Moldova)	0–1	(Turkey) Fenerbahçe	Tiraspol, Moldova
19:00	Erokhin (yellow card) 45'; Karpovich (yellow card) 78'	Report	Alex 53'	Stadium: Sheriff Stadium; Referee: Aleksandar Stavrev (Belarus)

22 October 2009 3	Steaua București (Romania)	0–1	(Turkey) Fenerbahçe	Bucharest, Romania
19:00	Bicfalvi (yellow card) 19'; Golański (yellow card) 37'; Toja (yellow card) 88'	Report	Lugano (yellow card) 28'; Kazim-Richards (yellow card) 45+3', (goal) 59'; Belözoğlu (yellow card) 82'; Gönül (yellow card) 90+2'	Stadium: Stadionul Steaua; Referee: Dougie McDonald (Scotland)

5 November 2009 4	Fenerbahçe (Turkey)	3–1	(Romania) Steaua București	Istanbul, Turkey
21:05	Santos 15', (yellow card) 43'; Bilica 51'; Topuz (yellow card) 66'; Alex 67'; Kazim-Richards (yellow card) 70'	Report	Kapetanos 38'	Stadium: Şükrü Saracoğlu Stadium; Referee: Thomas Einwaller (Austria)

2 December 2009 5	Twente (Netherlands)	0–1	(Turkey) Fenerbahçe	Enschede, Netherlands
19:00	Douglas (yellow card) 69'; Perez (yellow card) 88'; Boschker (yellow card) 90+1'	Report	Roberto Carlos (yellow card) 29'; Demirel (yellow card) 39'; Alex (yellow card) 63'; Lugano 71', (yellow card) 87'; Vederson (yellow card) 81'	Stadium: De Grolsch Veste; Referee: César Muñiz Fernández (Spain)

17 December 2009 6	Fenerbahçe (Turkey)	1–0	(Moldova) Sheriff Tiraspol	Istanbul, Turkey
21:05	Boral 15'	Report	França (yellow card) 42'; Tarkhnishvili (yellow card) 72'; Rouamba (yellow card) 90+1'	Stadium: Şükrü Saracoğlu Stadium; Referee: Zsolt Szabó (Hungary)

==== Round of 32 ====
18 February 2010 First leg	Lille (France)	2–1	(Turkey) Fenerbahçe	Lille, France
19:00	Balmont 3', (yellow card) 6'; Frau 52'; Cabaye (yellow card) 79'	Report	Vederson 5'; Belözoğlu (yellow card) 39'; Santos (yellow card) 71'	Stadium: Stadium Nord Lille Métropole; Referee: Eduardo Iturralde González (Spain)

25 February 2010 Second leg	Fenerbahçe (Turkey)	1–1 (2–3 agg.)	(France) Lille	Istanbul, Turkey
21:05	Belözoğlu 35'; Vederson (yellow card) 60'; Bilica (yellow card) 85'	Report	Rami 85'	Stadium: Şükrü Saracoğlu Stadium; Referee: Florian Meyer (Germany)

Source: uefa.com
