= 2008–09 Fenerbahçe S.K. season =

Fenerbahçe
2008–09 season
- President: Aziz Yıldırım
- Head coach: Luis Aragonés
- Stadium: Şükrü Saracoğlu Stadium
- Süper Lig: 4th
- Turkish Cup: Runner-up
- UEFA Champions League: Group stage
- Top goalscorer: League: Alex (11); All: Alex (17)
Home colours	Away colours	Third colours

The 2008–09 Fenerbahçe S.K. season was the club's 51st consecutive season in the Süper Lig and their 102nd year in existence. They also competed in the UEFA Champions League, starting the competition in the group stage.

== Kits ==
Home
Away
Third
Fourth

== Team squad ==
=== First-team squad ===
Note: Flags indicate national team as defined under FIFA eligibility rules; some limited exceptions apply. Players may hold more than one non-FIFA nationality.

No.	Pos.	Nation	Player
1	GK	TUR	Volkan Demirel
2	DF	URU	Diego Lugano
3	DF	BRA	Roberto Carlos
4	DF	BRA	Edu Dracena
5	MF	TUR	Emre Belözoğlu
6	DF	BRA	Gökçek Vederson
7	MF	TUR	Burak Yılmaz
8	MF	TUR	Colin Kazim-Richards
10	MF	BRA	Alex (Captain)
14	FW	ESP	Dani Güiza
16	MF	ESP	Josico
17	DF	TUR	Can Arat
18	MF	TUR	Ali Bilgin
19	DF	BEL	Önder Turacı
20	MF	TUR	Gökhan Emreciksin

No.	Pos.	Nation	Player
21	MF	TUR	Selçuk Şahin
23	FW	TUR	Semih Şentürk (Vice-captain)
24	MF	TUR	Deniz Barış
25	MF	TUR	Uğur Boral
32	MF	TUR	Gürhan Gürsoy
33	MF	CHI	Claudio Maldonado
38	FW	TUR	İlhan Parlak
53	DF	TUR	Yasin Çakmak
55	MF	TUR	Özgür Çek
77	DF	TUR	Gökhan Gönül
88	GK	TUR	Volkan Babacan
89	GK	TUR	Mert Günok
91	MF	TUR	Abdülkadir Kayalı
99	MF	BRA	Deivid

== Transfers ==
In	Transfer fee	From
Summer
Luis Aragonés	Free	Spain
Emre Belözoğlu	€4,500,000	(England) Newcastle United
Burak Yılmaz	Not Disclosed + 3 loan	(Turkey) Vestel Manisaspor
Dani Güiza	€14,000,000	(Spain) Mallorca
Josico	€1,000,000	(Spain) Villarreal
Winter
Gökhan Emreciksin	€1,000,000	(Turkey) Ankaragücü
Abdülkadir Kayalı	€1,000,000	(Turkey) Ankaragücü
Furkan Aydın	€225,000	(Turkey) Sakaryaspor
Onur Karakabak	€225,000	(Turkey) Sakaryaspor
Out	Transfer Fee	To
Summer
Zico	Free	(Uzbekistan) Bunyodkor
Serdar Kulbilge	Free	(Turkey) Kocaelispor
Mehmet Aurélio	€1,000,000 (Compensation)	(Spain) Real Betis
Kemal Aslan	Not Disclosed	(Turkey) Kocaelispor
Olcan Adın	Loan	(Turkey) Gaziantepspor
Mateja Kežman	Loan	(France) Paris Saint-Germain
Winter
Tümer Metin	Free	(Greece) Larissa

== Pre-season friendlies ==
Pre-Season
11 July 2008	Fenerbahçe	1–1	Swindon Town
16 July 2008	Fenerbahçe	0–0	Sparta Prague
19 July 2008	Fenerbahçe	1–1	Dynamo České Budějovice
23 July 2008	Fenerbahçe	2–1	Shakhtar Donetsk

== Süper Lig ==
Pos	Team	Pld	W	D	L	GF	GA	GD	Pts	Qualification or relegation
2	Sivasspor	34	19	9	6	54	28	+26	66	Qualification to Champions League third qualifying round
3	Trabzonspor	34	19	8	7	54	34	+20	65	Qualification to Europa League play-off round
4	Fenerbahçe	34	18	7	9	60	36	+24	61	Qualification to Europa League third qualifying round
5	Galatasaray	34	18	7	9	57	39	+18	61	Qualification to Europa League second qualifying round (Note: 2008–09 Turkish Cup was won by Champions League-qualified side Beşiktaş. Since cup runners-up Fenerbahçe secured a place in the European competitions via league position, the spot allocation for the 2009–10 UEFA Europa League effectively reverted to league positions.)
6	Bursaspor	34	16	10	8	47	36	+11	58	

Rules for classification: 1st points; 2nd head-to-head points; 3rd head-to-head goal difference; 4th head-to-head goals scored; 5th head-to-head away goals scored; 6th goal difference; 7th goals scored

=== Results summary ===
Overall								Home						Away					
Pld	W	D	L	GF	GA	GD	Pts	W	D	L	GF	GA	GD	W	D	L	GF	GA	GD
34	18	7	9	60	36	+24	61	12	3	2	42	17	+25	6	4	7	18	19	−1

Source: Competition Matches

== UEFA Champions League ==
All times are EET

=== 2nd qualifying round ===
30 July 2008 First leg	Fenerbahçe (Turkey)	2–0	(Hungary) MTK Hungária	Istanbul, Turkey
21:00	Roberto Carlos 16'; Şahin 59'			Stadium: Şükrü Saracoğlu Stadium; Referee: Serge Gumienny (Belgium)

6 August 2008 Second leg	MTK Hungária (Hungary)	0–5 (0–7 agg.)	(Turkey) Fenerbahçe	Budapest, Hungary
21:30	Şentürk 5', 60', 78', 80'; Belözoğlu 66' (pen.)			Stadium: Szusza Ferenc Stadium; Referee: Mark Clattenburg (England)

=== 3rd qualifying round ===
13 August 2008 First leg	Partizan (Serbia)	2–2	(Turkey) Fenerbahçe	Belgrade, Serbia
21:00	Paunović 11'; Bogunović 14'		Alex 45+2' (pen.); Güiza 50'	Stadium: Stadion Partizana; Referee: Craig Thomson (Scotland)

27 August 2008 Second leg	Fenerbahçe (Turkey)	2–1 (4–3 agg.)	(Serbia) Partizan	Istanbul, Turkey
20:00	Şentürk 28'; Alex 59'		Tošić 76'	Stadium: Şükrü Saracoğlu Stadium; Referee: Manuel Mejuto González (Spain)

=== Group stage ===
Pos	Team	Pld	W	D	L	GF	GA	GD	Pts	Qualification	POR	ARS	DKV	FEN
1	(Portugal) Porto	6	4	0	2	9	8	+1	12	Advance to knockout phase	—	2–0	0–1	3–1
2	(England) Arsenal	6	3	2	1	11	5	+6	11	Advance to knockout phase	4–0	—	1–0	0–0
3	(Ukraine) Dynamo Kyiv	6	2	2	2	4	4	0	8	Transfer to UEFA Cup	1–2	1–1	—	1–0
4	(Turkey) Fenerbahçe	6	0	2	4	4	11	−7	2		1–2	2–5	0–0	—

Source: RSSSF

17 September 2008 1	Porto (Portugal)	3–1	(Turkey) Fenerbahçe	Porto, Portugal
21:45	López 10'; L. González 13'; Lino 90+2'	Report	Güiza 29'	Stadium: Estádio do Dragão; Attendance: 38,709; Referee: Bertrand Layec (France)

30 September 2008 2	Fenerbahçe (Turkey)	0–0	(Ukraine) Dynamo Kyiv	Istanbul, Turkey
21:45		Report		Stadium: Şükrü Saracoğlu Stadium; Attendance: 35,112; Referee: Thomas Einwaller (Austria)

21 October 2008 3	Fenerbahçe (Turkey)	2–5	(England) Arsenal	Istanbul, Turkey
21:45	Silvestre 19' (o.g.); Güiza 78'	Report	Adebayor 10'; Walcott 11'; Diaby 22'; Song 49'; Ramsey 90+4'	Stadium: Şükrü Saracoğlu Stadium; Attendance: 42,619; Referee: Peter Fröjdfeldt (Sweden)

5 November 2008 4	Arsenal (England)	0–0	(Turkey) Fenerbahçe	London, England
21:45		Report		Stadium: Emirates Stadium; Attendance: 60,003; Referee: Roberto Rosetti (Italy)

25 November 2008 5	Fenerbahçe (Turkey)	1–2	(Portugal) Porto	Istanbul, Turkey
21:45	Kazim-Richards 63'	Report	López 19', 28'	Stadium: Şükrü Saracoğlu Stadium; Attendance: 38,120; Referee: Alberto Undiano Mallenco (Spain)

10 December 2008 6	Dynamo Kyiv (Ukraine)	1–0	(Turkey) Fenerbahçe	Kyiv, Ukraine
21:45	Eremenko 20'	Report		Stadium: Lobanovsky Dynamo Stadium; Attendance: 14,000; Referee: Florian Meyer (Germany)

== Turkish Cup ==
All times are EET

=== Group stage ===
Pos	Team	Pld	W	D	L	GF	GA	GD	Pts
1	Fenerbahçe	4	4	0	0	7	0	+7	12
2	Bursaspor	4	3	0	1	9	2	+7	9
3	Eskişehirspor	4	1	1	2	3	7	−4	4
4	MKE Ankaragücü	4	1	0	3	2	4	−2	3
5	Tokatspor	4	0	1	3	1	9	−8	1

Source: tff.org (in Turkish)
Rules for classification: 1) points; 2) goal difference; 3) number of goals scored.

29 October 2008 1	Ankaragücü	0–1	Fenerbahçe	Ankara
20:00			Şentürk 6'; Kazim-Richards (red card) 70'	Stadium: 19 Mayıs Stadium; Referee: Hakan Özkan

7 January 2009 2	Fenerbahçe	2–0	Bursaspor	Istanbul
20:00	Şahin 42'; Roberto Carlos 84'			Stadium: Şükrü Saracoğlu Stadium; Referee: Cüneyt Çakır

11 January 2009 3	Tokatspor	0–1	Fenerbahçe	Tokat
13:30			Kazim-Richards 9'	Stadium: Gaziosmanpaşa Stadium; Referee: Selçuk Dereli

18 January 2009 4	Fenerbahçe	3–0	Eskişehirspor	Istanbul
19:30	Alex 28'; Deivid 52'; Roberto Carlos 88'		Özkan (red card) 9'	Stadium: Şükrü Saracoğlu Stadium; Referee: Deniz Çoban

=== Quarter-final ===
28 January 2009 First leg	Fenerbahçe	1–0	Bursaspor	Istanbul
	Deivid 44'			Stadium: Şükrü Saracoğlu Stadium; Referee: Mustafa Kamil Aibtoğlu

4 February 2009 Second leg	Bursaspor	1–3 (1–4 agg.)	Fenerbahçe	Bursa
	Öztürk 84'		Alex 22', 25'; Güiza 40'	Stadium: Bursa Atatürk Stadium; Referee: Hüseyin Göçek

=== Semi-final ===
4 March 2009 First leg	Fenerbahçe	3–1	Sivasspor	Istanbul
	Barış 66'; Edu Dracena 75'; Deivid 84'		Bilica 82'	Stadium: Şükrü Saracoğlu Stadium; Referee: Fırat Aydınus

22 April 2009 Second leg	Sivasspor	0–0 (1–3 agg.)	Fenerbahçe	Sivas
				Stadium: Sivas 4 Eylül Stadium; Referee: Mustafa Kamil Abitoğlu

=== Final ===
13 May 2009 Final	Fenerbahçe	2–4	Beşiktaş	İzmir
20:00	Güiza 27'; Alex 90' (pen.)		Şimşek 6'; Bobô 56', 74'; Hološko 80'	Stadium: İzmir Atatürk Stadium; Referee: Bünyamin Gezer
