= 2009 Turkish Super Cup =

- Event: Turkish Super Cup
Beşiktaş	Fenerbahçe
0	2
- Date: August 2, 2009
- Venue: Atatürk Olympic Stadium, Istanbul
- Man of the Match: Alex de Souza (Fenerbahçe)
- Referee: Yunus Yıldırım (Turkey)
- Weather: Fine

TFF Süper Kupa 2009 (English: TFF Super Cup) was the 37th edition the Turkish Super Cup since its establishment. This was the first time, Turkish Super Cup was held in Istanbul. The match was the first official football encounter in Turkey before the 2009–10 season, held on 2 August 2009, in Atatürk Olympic Stadium. The previous versions were organized in German cities of Frankfurt, Köln, and Duisburg.

Beşiktaş, the defending champions of both Süper Lig and Turkish Cup and Fenerbahçe, the finalist of Turkish Cup, were the competing sides for the triumphant.

The two teams had their first meeting for the cup in 2007, in which Fenerbahçe had won 2–1. The Istanbul rivals faced each other in Atatürk Olympic Stadium for the first time.

There were injured players who missing the match of both sides; Delgado, Üzülmez and Dağ for Beşiktaş and, Roberto Carlos and Hurmacı for Fenerbahçe. This encounter was the 324th one in the clubs 85-year-old rivalry, in which Fenerbahçe led in having the most wins, 120 to 119 that far, scoring 438 goals in total.

== Match details ==
2 August 2009
21:00 EEST

Beşiktaş	0–2	Fenerbahçe
	Report (in Turkish)	Alex 75' (pen.), 90+2'

Atatürk Olympic Stadium, Istanbul
Referee: Yunus Yıldırım

Beşiktaş	Fenerbahçe

BEŞİKTAŞ:
GK	1	(Turkey) Rüştü Reçber
DF	44	(Turkey) Erhan Güven		(substituted off) 82'
DF	27	(Italy) Matteo Ferrari
DF	6	(Czech Republic) Tomáš Sivok	(yellow card) 73'
DF	3	(Turkey) İsmail Köybaşı
MF	28	(Germany) Fabian Ernst
MF	14	(Chile) Rodrigo Tello		(substituted off) 79'
MF	29	(Turkey) Yusuf Şimşek	(yellow card) 33'	(substituted off) 46'
MF	5	(Germany) Michael Fink
FW	11	(Brazil) (Turkey) Mert Nobre (c)
FW	13	(Brazil) Bobô	(yellow card) 52'
Substitutes:
GK	84	(Turkey) Hakan Arıkan
DF	7	(Turkey) Rıdvan Şimşek		(substituted on) 81'
DF	19	(Turkey) İbrahim Üzülmez
MF	18	(Turkey) Necip Uysal
MF	25	(Turkey) (Germany) Uğur İnceman
FW	8	(Turkey) Nihat Kahveci		(substituted on) 46'
FW	23	(Slovakia) Filip Hološko		(substituted on) 79'
Manager:
(Turkey) Mustafa Denizli
Man of the match:
(Brazil) Alex (Fenerbahçe)

FENERBAHÇE:
GK	1	(Turkey) Volkan Demirel
DF	77	(Turkey) Gökhan Gönül
DF	58	(Brazil) Bilica	(yellow card) 52'
DF	19	(Turkey) (Belgium) Önder Turacı
DF	3	(Brazil) (Turkey) Gökçek Vederson
MF	16	(Brazil) Cristian
MF	27	(Brazil) André Santos		(substituted off) 83'
MF	5	(Turkey) Emre Belözoğlu		(substituted off) 78'
MF	8	(Turkey) (England) Kazım Kazım		(substituted off) 58'
FW	10	(Brazil) Alex (c)
FW	9	(Spain) Daniel Güiza
Substitutes:
GK	88	(Turkey) Volkan Babacan
DF	15	(Turkey) Bekir İrtegün
MF	17	(Turkey) (Germany) Ali Bilgin
MF	21	(Turkey) Selçuk Şahin		(substituted on) 78'
MF	24	(Turkey) (Germany) Deniz Barış
MF	25	(Turkey) Uğur Boral		(substituted on) 83'
FW	99	(Brazil) (Portugal) Deivid		(substituted on) 58'
Manager:
(Germany) Christoph Daum

MATCH OFFICIALS
- Assistant referees:
  - Serkan Gençerler
  - Volkan Narinç

MATCH RULES

- 90 minutes + in case of a draw, 30 minutes extra time (15 min. halves)
- Penalty shoot-out if scores level after extra time
- Seven named substitutes
- Maximum of 3 substitutions

== See also ==
- Süper Lig 2008-09
