= Nizamettin Çalışkan =

Turkish footballer (born 1987)

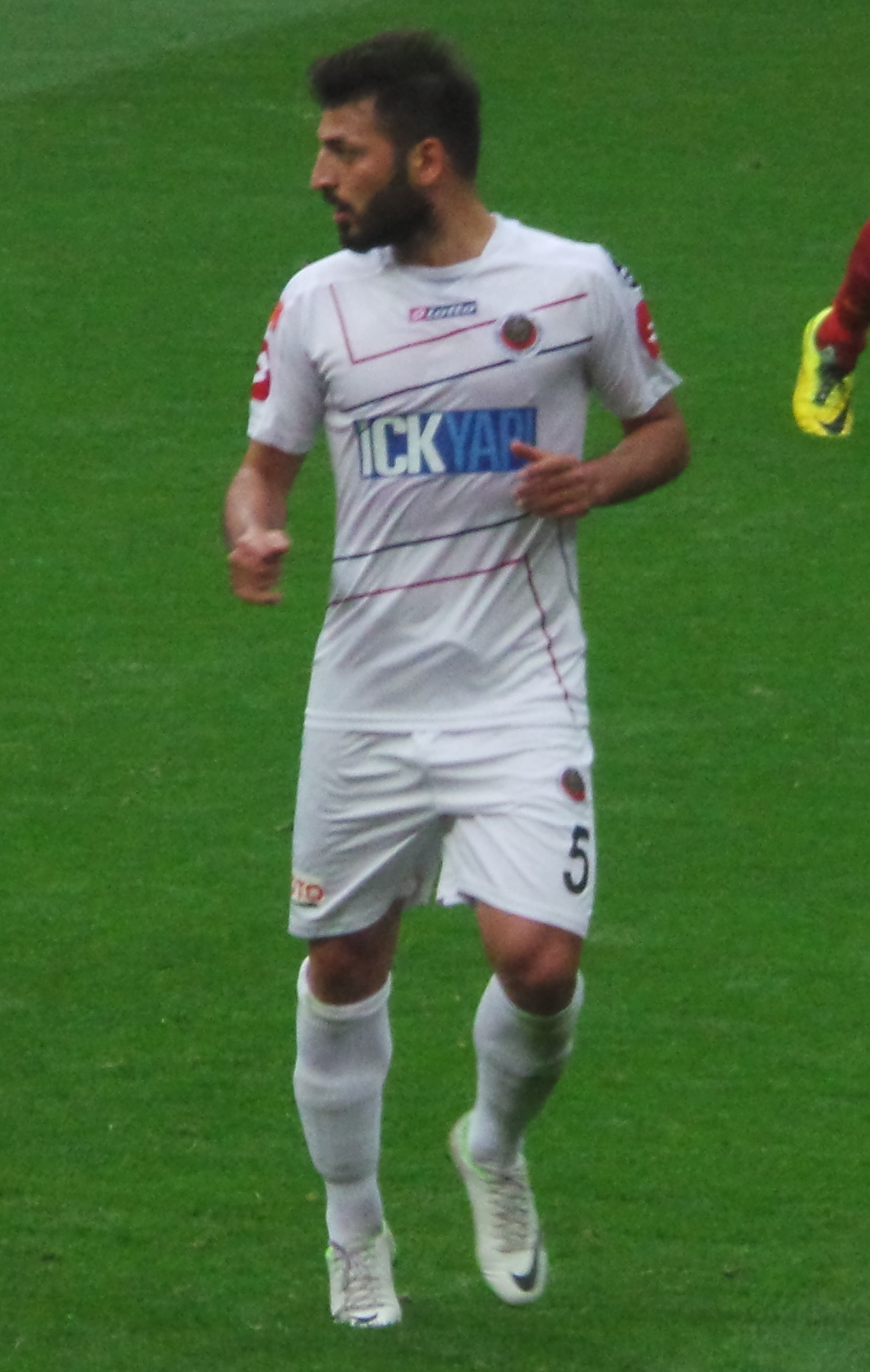
- Çalışkan with Gençlerbirliği in 2014

Personal information
- Date of birth: 20 March 1987 (age 39)
- Place of birth: Hagen, West Germany
- Height: 1.72 m (5 ft 8 in)
- Position: Midfielder

Team information
- Current team: Yalova FK 77
- Number: 5

Youth career
- Fortuna Hagen
- 1995–1999: Sportfreunde Geweke
- 1999–2004: Borussia Dortmund

Senior career*
Years	Team	Apps	(Gls)
2005–2006	Borussia Dortmund II	30	(10)
2006	Borussia Dortmund	2	(0)
2006–2012	Manisaspor	129	(4)
2012–2013	Orduspor	29	(1)
2013–2015	Gençlerbirliği	27	(0)
2016–2019	Balıkesirspor	87	(16)
2019–2023	Manisa FK	86	(15)
2023–2024	1461 Trabzon	13	(1)
2024–2025	Bucaspor 1928	42	(2)
2025–	Yalova FK 77	11	(1)

International career
2004	Turkey U17	1	(0)
2005	Turkey U19	2	(0)
- * Club domestic league appearances and goals as of 23 September 2023

Nizamettin Çalışkan (born 20 March 1987) is a Turkish professional footballer who plays as a midfielder for TFF Third League club Yalova FK 77.

== Club career ==
A youth prospect of Borussia Dortmund, Çalışkan arrived at the academy in 1999 from Sportfreunde Geweke. Çalışkan was named the best player of the tournament at the DaimlerChrysler Junior Cup in 2005. In the 2005–06 season he was promoted to the first team squad. On 22 April 2006, Çalışkan made his debut in the home game against 1. FC Nürnberg in the Bundesliga when he came on for his compatriot Nuri Şahin in the 83rd minute. On the last matchday of the season, Çalışkan was in the starting line-up for the first time in the game against Bayern Munich.

For the 2006–07 season, the midfielder moved to Turkey, where he signed with Manisaspor. There, he grew into a regular starter. In the summer of 2008, he suffered relegation to the second-tier TFF First League with Manisaspor, but immediately returned to the Süper Lig the following season. Since then, he became an integral part of the team and only a persistent injury in the 2010–11 season kept him sidelined. In the next season, however, he established himself again as a regular starter.

After his club suffered another relegation at the end of the 2011–12 season Çalışkan took advantage of the fact that his contract with Manisaspor was running out and moved to Orduspor within the league. After Orduspor also suffered relegation in the summer of 2013, he left the club and moved to the Süper Lig club Gençlerbirliği. He played the following two seasons there.

After remaining without a club for the 2015–16 season, he was signed by the second division side Balıkesirspor in the summer of 2016. He played there for three seasons and moved to the third-tier club Manisa FK for the 2019–20 season.

== International career ==
Çalışkan has gained caps for the Turkish under-17 and the under-19 teams.
