= Adem Sarı =

Turkish footballer

Personal information
- Date of birth: 9 May 1985 (age 41)
- Place of birth: Villingen, West Germany
- Height: 1.83 m (6 ft 0 in)
- Position: Striker

Team information
- Current team: Sivas Belediye Spor
- Number: 58

Youth career
- SV Obereschach
- VfB Villingen
- FC 08 Villingen
- 2003–2004: SC Freiburg

Senior career*
Years	Team	Apps	(Gls)
2004–2007	FC 08 Villingen	52	(22)
2007–2008	TSG 1899 Hoffenheim II	12	(0)
2008	→ FC 08 Villingen (loan)	16	(6)
2008–2009	SC Pfullendorf	30	(17)
2009–2013	Eskişehirspor	29	(9)
2011	→ Denizlispor (loan)	11	(2)
2012	→ Şanlıurfaspor (loan)	13	(5)
2012–2013	→ Samsunspor (loan)	11	(2)
2013–2014	Altay	3	(1)
2014–2015	Gölbaşıspor	12	(1)
2015–	Sivas Belediye Spor	2	(1)
- * Club domestic league appearances and goals as of 15 September 2015

Adem Sarı (born 9 May 1985) is a Turkish footballer who currently plays for TFF Second League club Sivas Belediye Spor. In December 2009 he scored 2 goals in his team Eskişehirspor's 2–1 win over Fenerbahce, taking his tally to 10 goals in 23 games, in all competitions.

People in Indonesia make jokes about his name as his name is similar with one of famous brand in Indonesia, Adem Sari, a drink to relieve sore throat. Indonesian people even asked him whether he has Indonesian descendant or not but he told that both of his parents are Turkish
