= Yiğit İncedemir =

Turkish footballer (born 1985)

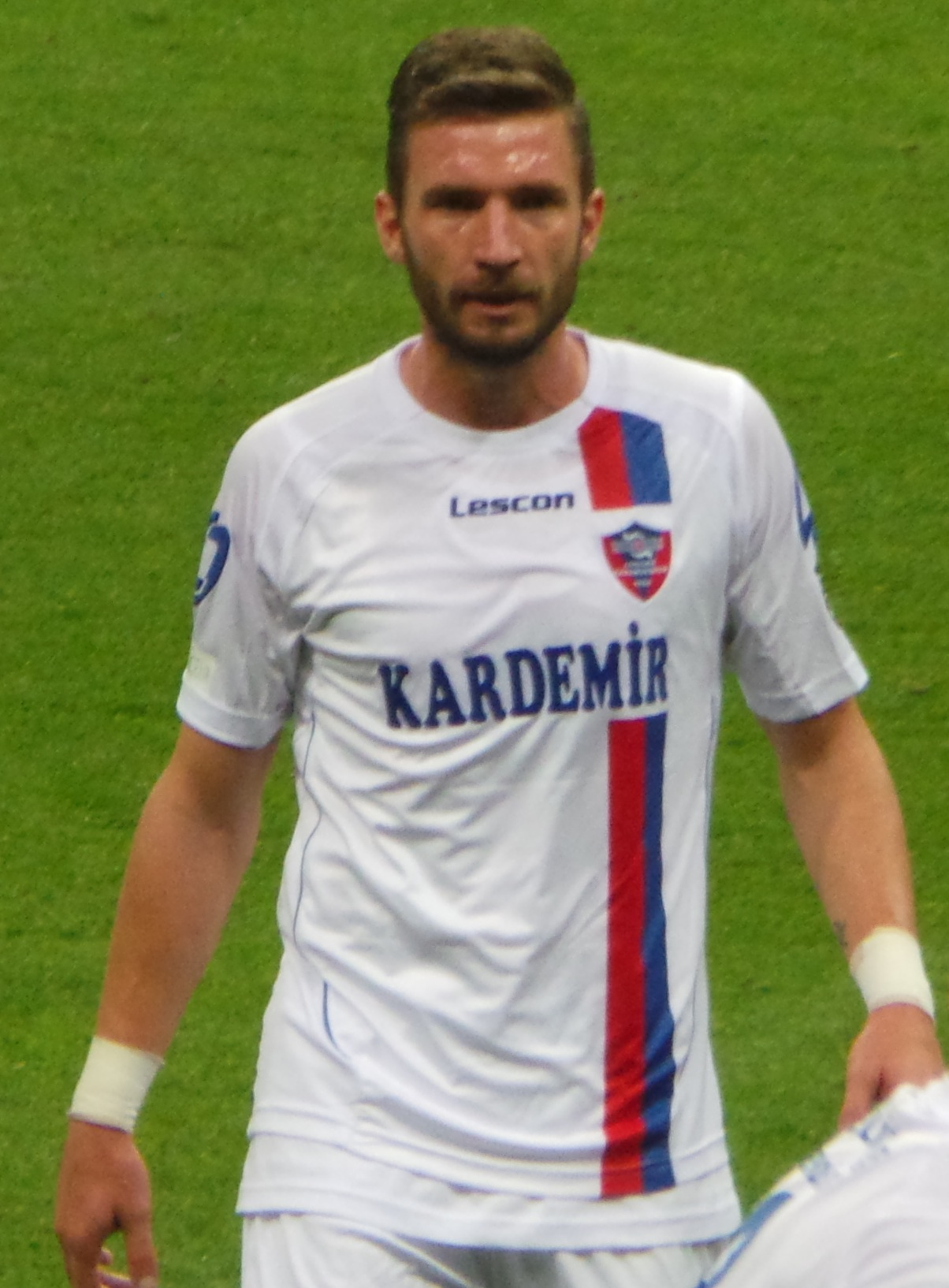

Personal information
- Date of birth: 9 March 1985 (age 41)
- Place of birth: İzmir, Turkey
- Height: 1.87 m (6 ft 1 1/2 in)
- Positions: Defensive midfielder; centre back

Youth career
- 1997–1999: Güraltay
- 1999–2002: İzmirspor

Senior career*
Years	Team	Apps	(Gls)
2002–2003	İzmirspor	18	(1)
2003–2007	Karşıyaka	77	(3)
2007–2008	Adana Demirspor	33	(0)
2008–2012	Manisaspor	100	(3)
2012–2015	Karabükspor	76	(2)
2015–2017	Sivasspor	45	(1)
2017–2018	Adana Demirspor	27	(2)
2018–2019	Fatih Karagümrük	3	(0)

International career
2001	Turkey U15	2	(0)
2002–2003	Turkey U18	5	(0)
2003	Turkey U19	9	(0)
2010–2011	Turkey	2	(0)
- * Club domestic league appearances and goals as of 21:48, 16 May 2019 (UTC)

Yiğit İncedemir (born 9 March 1985) is a Turkish footballer who plays as a defensive midfielder. He was also a youth international, earning caps at the Turkey U-15, U-18, and U-19 levels.

== Club career ==
İncedemir began his amateur career with Güraltay in 1997. İzmirspor transferred him in 1999, before transferring him to Karşıyaka in 2003. He spent four years with the club before joining Adana Demirspor in 2007. Manisaspor signed him in 2008. İncedemir made his senior debut for the Turkey national team after being chosen by Guus Hiddink to play against Netherlands. İncedemir came on as a substitute for Selçuk İnan on the 90th minute, and Turkey lost the game 1-0.
