= Deivid =

Brazilian footballer and manager (born 1979)

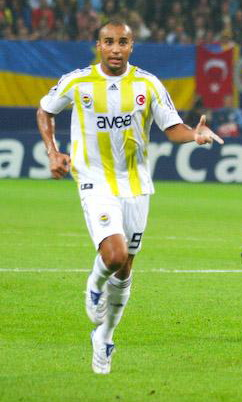
- Deivid in 2007

Personal information
- Full name: Deivid de Souza
- Date of birth: 22 October 1979 (age 47)
- Place of birth: Nova Iguaçu (RJ), Brazil
- Height: 1.80 m (5 ft 11 in)
- Position: Striker

Senior career*
Years	Team	Apps	(Gls)
1998–1999	Nova Iguaçu	0	(0)
1999	Joinville	28	(21)
1999–2001	Santos	129	(66)
2001–2003	Corinthians	52	(16)
2003	Cruzeiro	19	(15)
2003–2005	Bordeaux	23	(3)
2004–2005	→ Santos (loan)	48	(26)
2005–2006	Sporting CP	36	(9)
2006–2010	Fenerbahçe	94	(23)
2010–2012	Flamengo	56	(19)
2012–2014	Coritiba	30	(13)

Managerial career
- 2014–2015: Flamengo (assistant manager)
- 2015: Cruzeiro (assistant manager)
- 2016: Cruzeiro
- 2017: Criciúma
- * Club domestic league appearances and goals as of 16 September 2012

Deivid de Souza, commonly known as Deivid (born 22 October 1979), is a Brazilian professional football coach and former player who most recently managed Criciúma.

== Club career ==
=== Early career ===
At the beginning of the 2005–06 season, Deivid transferred from Santos in his home country, where he was paired up-front with compatriot and fellow forward Robinho, to Portuguese club Sporting CP for a sum of €3.7 million. This was the second time that he tried his hand in Europe after a short spell in France ended roughly a year prior.

=== Fenerbahçe ===
Deivid was transferred to Fenerbahçe SK in August 2006 for a sum of €4.5 million. He scored the second goal in the 88th minute against Trabzonspor on 13 May 2007 and helped Fenerbahçe win the Turkish Super League Championship after the game finishing 2–2 crowned them champions. However, he has not satisfied the supporters of the club yet and only performed well in a couple of matches in the last year. Football circles were sure that his contract would be terminated by the club due to his poor performance.

Deivid proved them wrong by becoming the star of the preseason training camp and by scoring an important goal against Beşiktaş J.K. in the Turkish Super Cup final, and by scoring the decisive goal in a 1–0 victory over Internazionale in the first match of the 2007–08 UEFA Champions League in the Şükrü Saracoğlu Stadium on 19 September 2007.

Deivid would score another important European goal for Fenerbahçe on the 2nd Champions League match day, to help them record a 2–2 draw away at CSKA Moscow. In the 3rd Champions League match day he was sent off against PSV Eindhoven.

In the 2007–08 UEFA Champions League round of 16 against Sevilla in Spain, Deivid also scored two goals which carried the match to extra time and then penalties. With his goals Fenerbahçe eliminated Sevilla and made it to the quarter final of the tournament for the first time in their history. In the first leg of the quarter-final match against Chelsea, Deivid scored an own goal in the thirteenth minute, when an attempted Florent Malouda cross struck his foot and passed his own keeper. He atoned for this mistake when he scored an astonishing 35-yard shot 9 minutes from the finish to give Fenerbahce a 2–1 lead after Colin Kazim-Richards had equalised.

During the preparation for the 2008–09 season he broke his left leg fibula and, shortly thereafter, his mother died which depressed him. He made his comeback from injury on 25 October 2008, when he joined the Turkish Super League game against Bursaspor at the 77th minute to substitute Semih Şentürk. He scored a goal during stoppage time.

=== Flamengo ===
In early August 2010, Fenerbahçe announced that the club and Deivid had mutually agreed to terminate Deivid's contract. Deivid then joined Flamengo. On 22 February 2012, Deivid missed what appeared to be a simple tap-in goal against Vasco da Gama, in the Clássico dos Milhões, in the semifinals of the Taça Guanabara.

=== Coritiba ===
On 3 September 2012, Deivid, after breaking his contract with Flamengo, signed with Coritiba until April 2015.

== Coaching career ==
After hanging up his boots, Deivid did several internships and coaching courses. In 2014, he was hired as an assistant at Flamengo, working alongside Vanderlei Luxemburgo. On 5 April 2015, he had its first game as a coach, replacing Luxemburgo which had been punished by FERJ with 2 games of suspension. Under his command Flamengo beat Fluminense by 3–0 in a Taça Guanabara game. He followed Luxemburgo as an assistant for Cruzeiro. After the exit of the manager, he remained in the permanent staff of the club. After the exit of the Mano Menezes, he signed as a manager.

== Career statistics ==
As of 19 August 2012

Appearances and goals by club, season and competition
Club	Season	League		Cup		Continental		State League		Total	
Club	Season	Apps	Goals	Apps	Goals	Apps	Goals	Apps	Goals	Apps	Goals
Corinthians	2001	0	0	-	-	-	-	-	-	0	0
Corinthians	2002	0	0	11	13	-	-	-	-	11	32
Corinthians	2003	0	0	-	-	-	-	-	-	0	0
Corinthians	Total	0	0	11	13	0	0	0	0	11	32
Cruzeiro	2003	19	15	-	-	-	-	-	-	19	15
Bordeaux	2003–04	23	3	-	-	-	-	-	-	23	3
Santos (loan)	2004	41	21	-	-	-	-	-	-	41	21
Santos (loan)	2005	7	5	-	-	-	-	-	-	7	5
Santos (loan)	Total	48	26	0	0	0	0	0	0	48	26
Sporting CP	2005–06	25	6	-	-	2	0	-	-	27	6
Sporting CP	2006–07	11	3	-	-	-	-	-	-	11	3
Sporting CP	Total	36	9	0	0	2	0	0	0	38	9
Fenerbahçe	2006–07	23	6	-	-	0	0	-	-	23	6
Fenerbahçe	2007–08	28	11	-	-	11	5	-	-	39	16
Fenerbahçe	2008–09	26	6	-	-	2	0	-	-	28	6
Fenerbahçe	2009–10	13	0	-	-	5	0	-	-	18	0
Fenerbahçe	Total	90	23	0	0	18	5	-	-	108	28
Flamengo	2010	17	4	-	-	-	-	-	-	17	4
Flamengo	2011	33	15	3	1	1	0	15	5	52	21
Flamengo	2012	6	0	-	-	7	2	12	4	25	6
Flamengo	Total	56	19	3	1	8	2	27	9	94	31
Coritiba	2012	13	8	-	-	-	-	-	-	13	8
Coritiba	2013	17	5	2	0	0	0	13	5	32	10
Coritiba	Total	30	13	2	0	-	-	13	5	45	18
Career total		302	108	5	1	28	7	40	14	375	130

according to combined sources on the Flamengo official website and Flaestatística.

== Honours ==
Corinthians

- Copa do Brasil: 2002

Cruzeiro

- Brazilian Série A: 2003
- Copa do Brasil: 2003

Santos

- Brazilian Série A: 2004

Fenerbahçe

- Süper Lig: 2006–07
- Turkish Super Cup: 2007, 2009

Flamengo

- Rio de Janeiro State League: 2011

Coritiba

- Paraná State Championship: 2013
