= Colin Kazim-Richards =

Turkish footballer (born 1986)

Colin Kazım-Richards
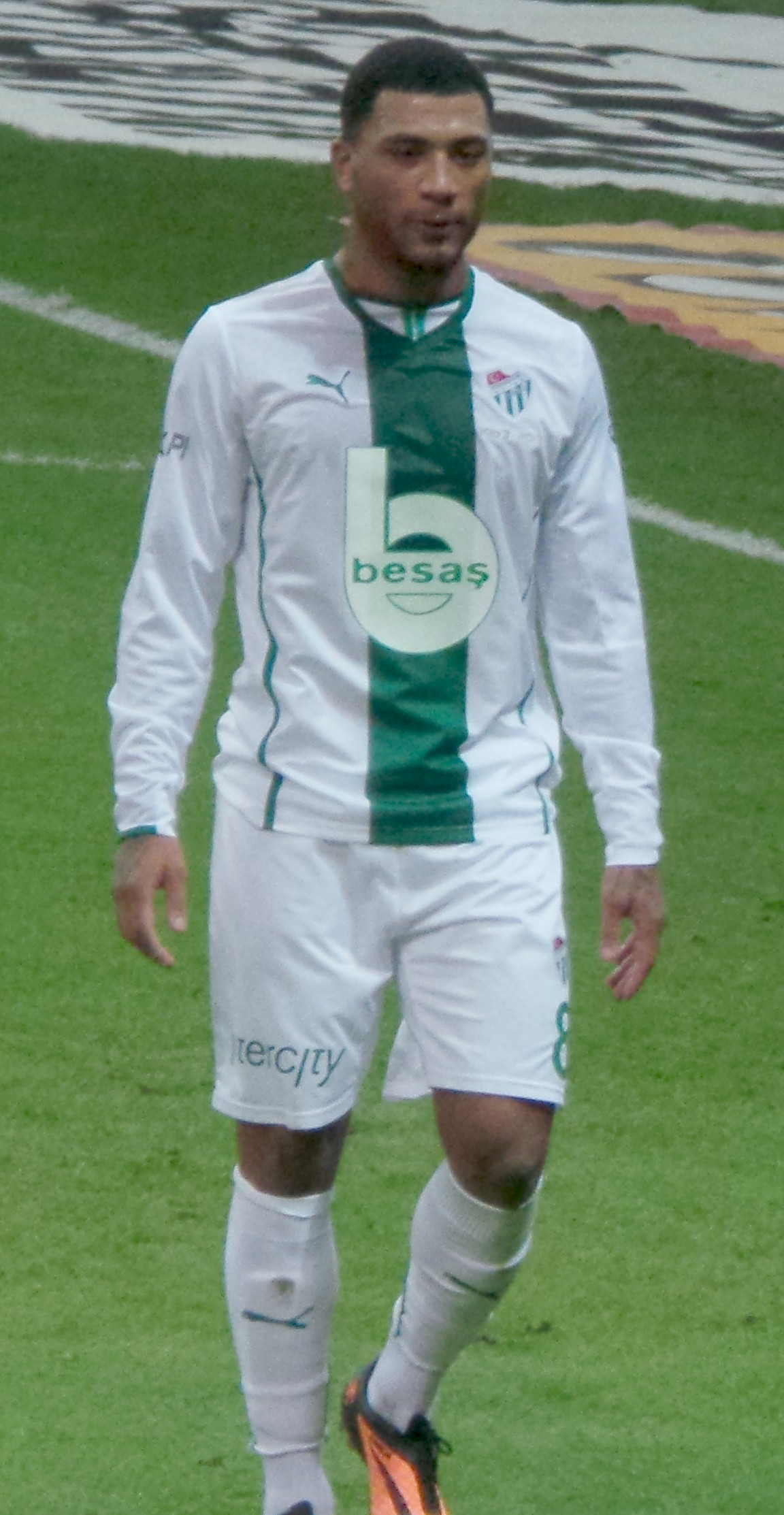
- Kazım-Richards playing for Bursaspor in 2014

Personal information
- Full name: Colin Kazım-Richards
- Date of birth: 26 August 1986 (age 40)
- Place of birth: Leyton, London, England
- Position: Forward

Youth career
- 1995–1997: Interwood
- 1997–1998: Queens Park Rangers
- 1998–2001: Arsenal
- 2001–2004: Bury

Senior career*
Years	Team	Apps	(Gls)
2004–2005	Bury	30	(3)
2005–2006	Brighton & Hove Albion	43	(6)
2006–2007	Sheffield United	27	(1)
2007–2011	Fenerbahçe	66	(5)
2010	→ Toulouse (loan)	15	(2)
2011–2013	Galatasaray	31	(5)
2012	→ Olympiacos (loan)	9	(1)
2012–2013	→ Blackburn Rovers (loan)	28	(3)
2013–2015	Bursaspor	16	(0)
2014–2015	→ Feyenoord (loan)	27	(11)
2015–2016	Feyenoord	11	(1)
2016	Celtic	11	(1)
2016	Coritiba	21	(3)
2017–2018	Corinthians	15	(1)
2018	→ Lobos BUAP (loan)	10	(3)
2019	Veracruz	23	(8)
2020	Pachuca	13	(3)
2020–2022	Derby County	61	(11)
2022–2023	Fatih Karagümrük	17	(0)
Total		474	(68)

International career
2007	Turkey U21	5	(1)
2008	Turkey B	1	(0)
2007–2015	Turkey	37	(2)

Managerial career
- 2026: Crawley Town
- * Club domestic league appearances and goals

Colin Kazım-Richards (born 26 August 1986), also known as Colin Kâzım, Kâzım or Kâzım Kâzım, is a professional football coach and former player who played as a forward. He was most recently head coach of EFL League Two club Crawley Town. Born in England, Kazim-Richards represented the Turkey national team.

Having played for the youth teams of Queens Park Rangers and Arsenal, Kazim-Richards was handed a professional contract by Bury. He went on to feature in the Football League for Brighton & Hove Albion and in the Premier League for Sheffield United before forging a career in Europe with Fenerbahçe, Toulouse, Galatasaray, Olympiacos, Bursaspor, Feyenoord and Fatih Karagümrük. Kazim-Richards had spells back in the United Kingdom with Blackburn Rovers, Celtic and Derby County, and also spent four years playing in Latin America with Coritiba, Corinthians, Lobos BUAP, Veracruz and Pachuca.

Born and raised in England, he qualified for Turkish nationality through his mother's heritage. In 2007, Kazim-Richards chose to represent Turkey at international level, retiring in 2015. He earned 37 caps, scoring twice. He was also capped at Turkey B and under-21 level.

== Club career ==
=== Bury ===
Kazim-Richards left his native East London to play for Bury when he was 15.

=== Brighton & Hove Albion ===
In June 2005, at the age of 18, he was signed on a three-year contract by Brighton & Hove Albion for £250,000. The contract was signed after a fan of the club, Aaron Berry, won the sum for the club in a competition run by Coca-Cola which, in turn, led to Kazim-Richards being dubbed the "Coca-Cola Kid". In August 2006, at the start of the new season, he tried to hand in a transfer request after being dropped by manager Mark McGhee.

=== Sheffield United ===
Subsequently, Brighton sold him to Sheffield United for £150,000 on 31 August 2006, the deadline day for the transfer window. Kazim-Richards signed a three-year deal with the Blades after passing a medical and agreeing personal terms. He scored once in his only season in top-flight English football for the eventually relegated Blades, in a 2–2 draw with Bolton Wanderers on 11 November 2006.

=== Fenerbahçe ===
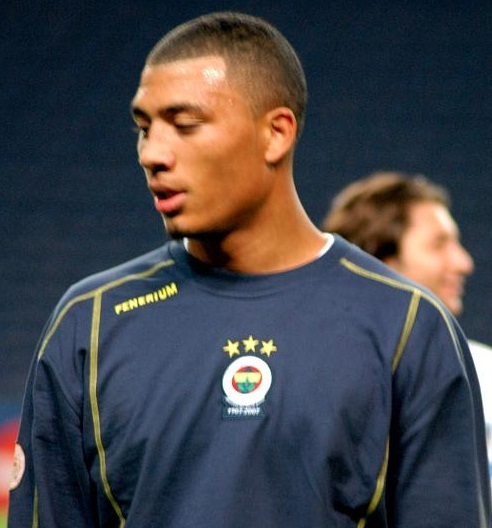
Kazim-Richards with Fenerbahçe in 2008

On 15 June 2007, Kazim-Richards signed a four-year contract with the Turkish club Fenerbahçe. He scored his second UEFA Champions League goal for Fenerbahçe in the quarter-final first leg against Chelsea on 2 April 2008. After serving as a rotation player during the 2007–08 and 2008–09 seasons, Kazim-Richards broke into Christoph Daum's first choice line-up in the 2009–10 season.

Despite success on the pitch during the 2009–10 season, Kazim-Richards had an argument with Fenerbahçe fans after being taken off the pitch in a match against İstanbul Başakşehir. Against Beşiktaş, Kazim-Richards was red carded for swearing at the referee and banned for four matches. While serving his ban, on the same night that his teammates lost to Kasımpaşa, the media reported Kazim-Richards was out on the town. This report was denied by the Fenerbahçe board who released an official statement. The following day, pictures of Kazim-Richards were released and the Fenerbahçe board rescinded their earlier statement, claiming that Kazim-Richards had lied about his whereabouts which had triggered their denial of the report.

==== Toulouse (loan) ====
Kazim-Richards joined French club Toulouse on a six-month loan from January 2010, for whom he scored on his debut in a 3–1 away win against Le Mans.

=== Galatasaray ===
He returned to Fenerbahçe for the following season. On 3 January 2011, Fenerbahçe terminated his contract. He signed a three-and-a-half-year contract with local rivals Galatasaray in January 2011 scoring against Fenerbahçe during the season. In July 2012 he went on trial with English Premier League side West Ham United, appearing in pre-season friendlies. He played a total of thirty one matches scoring five goals.

==== Blackburn Rovers (loan) ====
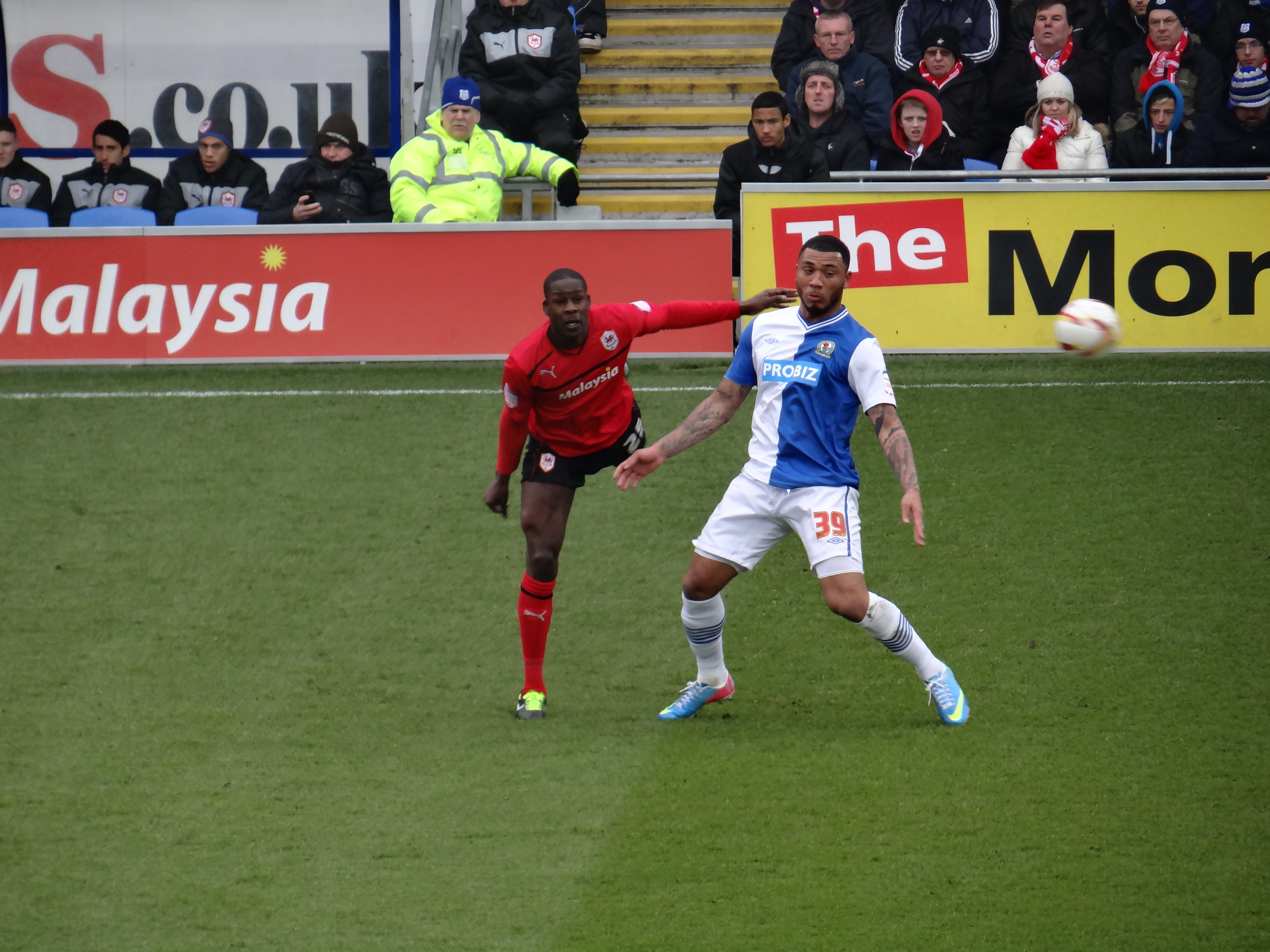
Kazim-Richards (right) playing for Blackburn Rovers against Cardiff City in 2013

On 10 August 2012 it was confirmed by the official Blackburn Rovers website that the striker had joined the club on a one-year loan deal with the view to a permanent transfer after spending the majority of pre season on trial with the Lancashire club. He scored two goals on his debut in pre season against Cork City. On 18 August he scored on his competitive debut in a 1–1 away draw against Ipswich Town.

On 24 May 2013 it was announced that Sussex Police had charged Kazim-Richards under Section 5 of the Public Order Act over an alleged homophobic gesture to Brighton fans on 12 February 2013 while he was playing for Blackburn Rovers in a Championship match at his old club Brighton & Hove Albion's Falmer Stadium. He was due to appear before magistrates in Brighton on 22 August 2013. The trial was set for 14 and 15 January 2014 at Brighton Magistrates Court. He was found guilty in April 2014 and fined £750 plus costs of £1,445. Richards has since stated that he has no regrets over his actions.

=== Bursaspor ===
On 4 September 2013, Kazim-Richards joined Bursaspor for €250,000. He signed a four-year deal on a salary of €1 million per year. Kazim-Richards scored his first official goal for Bursaspor in a Turkish Cup game against Adana Demirspor.

=== Feyenoord ===
After a successful loan spell at Feyenoord during the 2014–15 season, Kazim-Richards made a permanent move to the Dutch club in the summer of 2015.

On 15 January 2016, Kazim-Richards threatened Dutch Algemeen Dagblad newspaper journalist Mikos Gouka. As a result, Feyenoord manager Giovanni van Bronckhorst dropped him from the squad and he did not play the next match, against PSV.

=== Celtic ===
On 1 February 2016, Kazim-Richards joined Scottish club Celtic, signing a two-and-a-half-year deal. He scored his first goal for the club in a Scottish Cup tie against East Kilbride on 7 February 2016.

=== Coritiba ===
On 9 June 2016, Kazim-Richards joined Brazilian club Coritiba, signing an eighteen-month deal. He scored on his debut in a derby against Atlético Paranaense after coming on as a substitute.

=== Corinthians ===
On 6 January 2017, Kazim-Richards signed with another Brazilian club, Corinthians, for a period of two years. In his debut, he scored in the friendly tournament the Florida Cup.

=== Lobos BUAP ===
Kazim-Richards completed a move to Lobos BUAP of Liga MX in July 2018.

=== Derby County ===
On 15 October 2020, he signed a one-year deal with Derby County. He scored his first goal for Derby in a 1–1 draw with Coventry City on 1 December 2020. On 26 February 2021 it was reported that Kazim-Richards had signed a contract extension to keep him at the club until the end of the 2022 season.

Following relegation in the 2021–22 season, Kazim-Richards departed the club upon the expiration of his contract.

=== Fatih Karagümrük ===
On 19 July 2022, he signed a one-year deal with Fatih Karagümrük S.K.

== International career ==
Kazim-Richards scored and was credited with an assist in his debut for the Turkey under-21 team in a victory against Switzerland on 24 March 2007. On 30 April, the Turkey national team coach Fatih Terim declared that Kazim-Richards would play for the senior team.

Terim called him up for matches against Bosnia and Herzegovina and Brazil. He received his first senior international cap in a 0–0 friendly draw against Brazil on 5 June 2007, a game in which he played 38 minutes. He was a member of Turkey's Euro 2008 squad, playing in all five matches as the side reached the semi-finals.

On 10 August 2011, he scored two goals in a friendly match against Estonia at Türk Telekom Stadium.

== Coaching career ==
Kazim-Richards was appointed as a coach in the Arsenal academy in summer 2024.

On 24 March 2026, Kazim-Richards was appointed as head coach of EFL League Two club Crawley Town with the club a point above the relegation places. Having avoided relegation on the final day of the season, he signed a new deal on 12 May 2026. However, after a disastrous start to the 2026–27 season, Kazim-Richards was sacked on 21 October 2026 with the club six points adrift of safety at the bottom of the table.

== Personal life ==
Born in London, Kazim-Richards attended Greenleaf Primary School in Walthamstow, where he developed an interest in football, which continued into his secondary education at Aveling Park, Walthamstow. His mother is a Turkish Cypriot (which enabled him to join the Turkey national team), and his father is of Antiguan descent.

In a 2008 interview he said:

It's difficult because half my family is Muslim, and the other half is Christian. I've always felt Turkish, though. My nene [grandmother], she can't speak English. Half of my family, their first language is Turkish, and so I went to Turkish school before I played football, although I can't remember any of it now.

In his youth, Kazim-Richards lost his infant brother to Edwards syndrome and three cousins in unrelated incidents: a heart attack while playing football, a brain haemorrhage in the bathtub, and a car crash. Another of his cousins, Andros Townsend, became a professional footballer, while his uncle, Troy Townsend, has worked heavily with Kick It Out, combatting racism in football.

== Media career ==
Following his professional football career, Kazim-Richards has become an active participant in football-focused online media, featuring as a pundit and guest on several prominent YouTube channels and podcasts.

He was a guest on the UK football and culture podcast, Filthy Fellas, appearing in multiple episodes to discuss his career experiences and contemporary football topics.. He has also made several appearances on the Football Park channel as a regular host.

== Career statistics ==
=== Club ===
As of match played 7 October 2023

Appearances and goals by club, season and competition
Club	Season	League			National cup (Note: Includes FA Cup, Turkish Cup, Coupe de France, KNVB Cup, Scottish Cup, Copa do Brasil, Copa MX)		League cup (Note: Includes Football League Cup, Coupe de la Ligue)		Continental		Other		Total	
Club	Season	Division	Apps	Goals	Apps	Goals	Apps	Goals	Apps	Goals	Apps	Goals	Apps	Goals
Bury	2004–05	League Two	30	3	1	0	0	0	—		1 (Note: Appearance in Football League Trophy)	0	32	3
Brighton & Hove Albion	2005–06	Championship	42	6	1	0	1	0	—		—		44	6
Brighton & Hove Albion	2006–07	League One	1	0	0	0	0	0	—		0	0	1	0
Brighton & Hove Albion	Total		43	6	1	0	1	0	—		0	0	45	6
Sheffield United	2006–07	Premier League	27	1	1	0	1	0	—		—		29	1
Fenerbahçe	2007–08	Süper Lig	28	0	4	1	—		10 (Note: Appearance(s) in UEFA Champions League)	1	1 (Note: Appearance in Turkish Super Cup)	0	43	2
Fenerbahçe	2008–09	Süper Lig	22	2	5	1	—		8	1	—		35	4
Fenerbahçe	2009–10	Süper Lig	11	3	1	0	—		7 (Note: Appearances in UEFA Europa League)	2	1	0	20	5
Fenerbahçe	2010–11	Süper Lig	5	0	1	0	—		1	0	—		7	0
Fenerbahçe	Total		66	5	11	2	—		26	4	2	0	105	11
Toulouse (loan)	2009–10	Ligue 1	15	2	1	0	2	0	0	0	—		18	2
Galatasaray	2010–11	Süper Lig	13	3	4	2	—		—		—		17	5
Galatasaray	2011–12	Süper Lig	18	2	0	0	—		—		—		18	2
Galatasaray	2012–13	Süper Lig	0	0	0	0	—		—		0	0	0	0
Galatasaray	2013–14	Süper Lig	0	0	0	0	—		—		0	0	0	0
Galatasaray	Total		31	5	4	2	—		—		0	0	35	7
Olympiacos (loan)	2011–12	Super League Greece	9	1	0	0	—		0	0	—		9	1
Blackburn Rovers (loan)	2012–13	Championship	28	3	3	2	0	0	—		—		31	5
Bursaspor	2013–14	Süper Lig	16	0	5	2	—		—		—		21	2
Bursaspor	2014–15	Süper Lig	0	0	0	0	—		—		0	0	0	0
Bursaspor	Total		16	0	5	2	—		—		0	0	21	2
Feyenoord (loan)	2014–15	Eredivisie	27	11	1	0	—		7	1	2 (Note: Appearances in Eredivisie European competition play-offs)	1	37	13
Feyenoord	2015–16	Eredivisie	11	1	1	0	—		—		—		12	1
Feyenoord	Total		38	12	2	0	—		7	1	2	1	49	14
Celtic	2015–16	Scottish Premiership	11	1	2	1	0	0	—		—		13	2
Coritiba	2016	Série A	21	3	0	0	—		4 (Note: Appearances in Copa Sudamericana)	0	—		25	3
Corinthians	2017	Série A	14	1	3	0	—		3	0	8 (Note: Appearances in Campeonato Paulista)	1	28	2
Corinthians	2018	Série A	1	0	0	0	—		—		4	0	5	0
Corinthians	Total		15	1	3	0	—		3	0	12	1	33	2
Lobos BUAP (loan)	2018–19	Liga MX	10	3	0	0	—		—		—		10	3
Veracruz	2018–19	Liga MX	15	4	4	1	—		—		—		19	5
Veracruz	2019–20	Liga MX	8	4	3	0	—		—		—		11	4
Veracruz	Total		23	8	7	1	—		—		—		40	9
Pachuca	2019–20	Liga MX	9	2	3	3	—		—		—		12	5
Pachuca	2020–21	Liga MX	4	1	0	0	—		—		—		4	1
Pachuca	Total		13	3	3	3	—		—		—		16	6
Derby County	2020–21	Championship	38	8	0	0	0	0	—		—		38	8
Derby County	2021–22	Championship	23	3	1	0	1	1	—		—		25	4
Derby County	Total		61	11	1	0	1	1	—		—		63	12
Fatih Karagümrük	2022–23	Süper Lig	17	0	2	1	—		—		—		19	1
Career total			474	68	47	14	5	1	40	5	17	2	583	90

=== International ===
As of 14 May 2020

Appearances and goals by national team and year
National team	Year	Apps	Goals
Turkey	2007	1	0
Turkey	2008	14	0
Turkey	2009	6	0
Turkey	2010	7	0
Turkey	2011	7	2
Turkey	2012	0	0
Turkey	2013	0	0
Turkey	2014	0	0
Turkey	2015	2	0
Total		37	2

As of 14 May 2020

Scores and results list Turkey's goal tally first, score column indicates score after each Kazim-Richards goal.

List of international goals scored by Colin Kazim-Richards
#	Date	Venue	Opponent	Score	Result	Competition
1	10 August 2011	Türk Telekom Stadium, Istanbul, Turkey	Estonia	2–0	3–0	Friendly
2	10 August 2011	Türk Telekom Stadium, Istanbul, Turkey	Estonia	3–0	3–0	Friendly

== Managerial statistics ==
As of match played 20 October 2026

Managerial record by team and tenure
Team	From	To	Record					Ref.
Team	From	To	P	W	D	L	Win %	Ref.
Crawley Town	25 March 2026	21 October 2026	21	5	5	11	23.8	
Total			21	5	5	11	23.8	

== Honours ==
Fenerbahçe

- Turkish Super Cup: 2007, 2009

Olympiacos

- Super League Greece: 2011–12

Galatasaray

- Turkish Super Cup: 2013

Celtic

- Scottish Premiership: 2015–16

Corinthians

- Série A: 2017
- Campeonato Paulista: 2017, 2018
