= Özer Hurmacı =

Turkish footballer

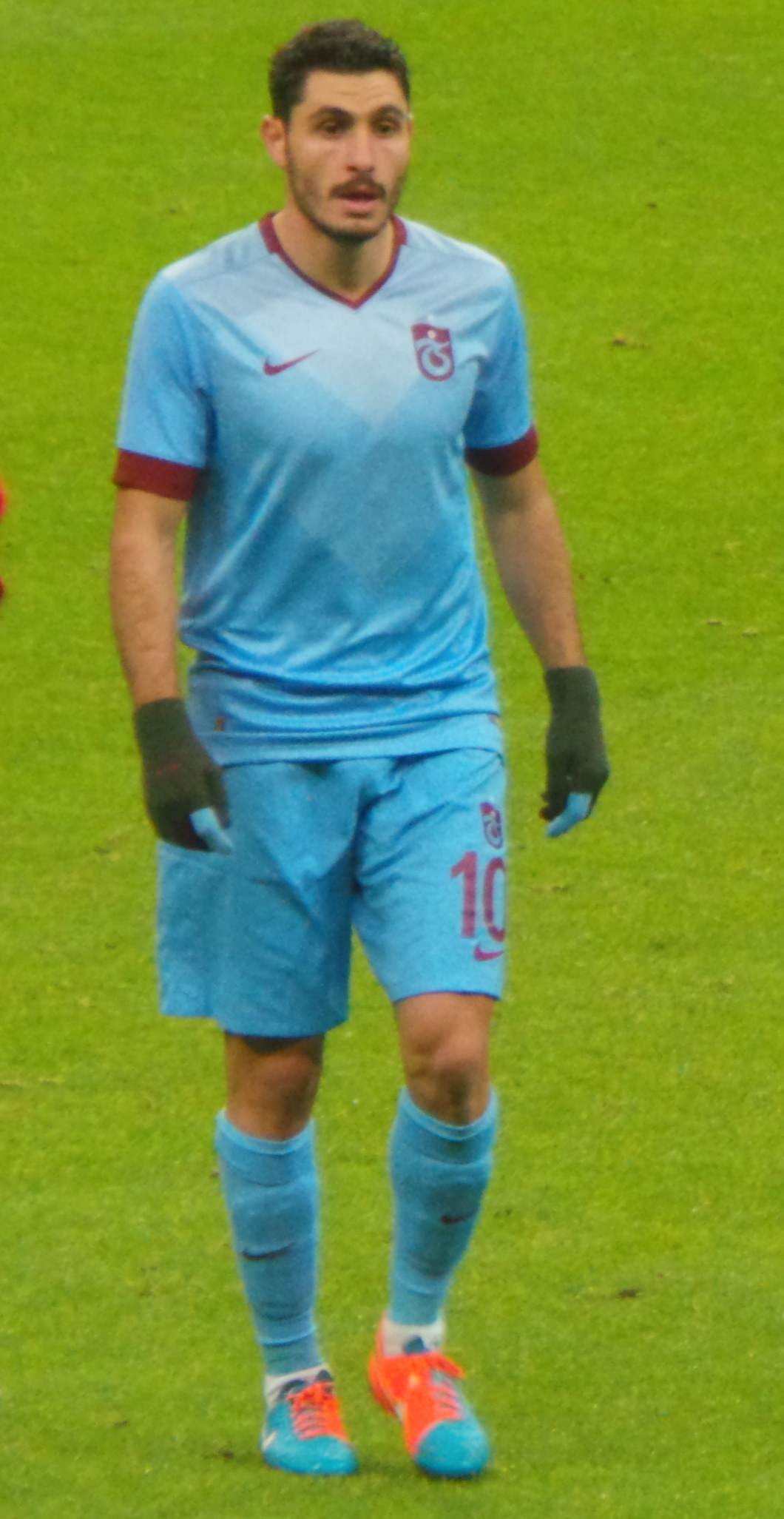
- Hurmacı playing for Trabzonspor in 2014

Personal information
- Date of birth: 20 November 1986 (age 39)
- Place of birth: Kassel, West Germany
- Height: 1.76 m (5 ft 9 in)
- Positions: Winger; attacking midfielder

Team information
- Current team: İstanbulspor (manager)

Youth career
- 2004–2005: Ankaraspor

Senior career*
Years	Team	Apps	(Gls)
2005–2009	Ankaraspor	27	(3)
2005–2006	→ Keçiörengücü (loan)	81	(5)
2009–2012	Fenerbahçe	50	(3)
2012–2015	Kasımpaşa	31	(6)
2014–2015	→ Trabzonspor (loan)	36	(9)
2015–2016	Trabzonspor	23	(0)
2016–2017	Akhisar Belediyespor	29	(5)
2017–2018	Osmanlıspor	19	(1)
2018–2019	BB Erzurumspor	16	(0)
2019	Sivasspor	12	(1)
2019–2021	Bursaspor	43	(6)
Total		367	(38)

International career
2005	Turkey U20	2	(0)
2006–2008	Turkey U21	18	(1)
2010	Turkey	2	(0)

Managerial career
- 2025: Viktoria Berlin
- 2026–: İstanbulspor
- * Club domestic league appearances and goals

Özer Hurmacı (born 20 November 1986) is a Turkish professional football coach and a former player who played as a winger or attacking midfielder. He is the manager of TFF 1. Lig club İstanbulspor. He played for the Turkey national team in varied age levels, including his two caps for senior level in 2010.

== Club career ==
=== Ankaraspor ===
Born in Kassel, Hurmacı started off his footballing career in his home town with amateur side Hermania Kassel. He then later had stints with Turkgucu Kassel and Baunatal. At the age of 17, he was scouted by Ankaraspor officials and played in the youth team in the 2004–05 season. His performances later earned him three-and-a-half-year deal in January.

The following season Hurmacı was loaned out to Keçiörengücü for the 2005–06 campaign. He played 29 games for the club, having a goal tally of three. He broke through the ranks in the 2007–08 season, signing an extension with the club until 2011.

In 2009, he went through an injury that has ruled him out of play for approximately a month, he had broken a bone in his foot during a match against city rivals Gençlerbirliği.

=== Fenerbahçe ===
On 15 June 2009, Hurmacı was transferred to Fenerbahçe for €6.2 million and in exchange Fenerbahçe sent İlhan Parlak and Özgür Çek. On 23 December 2009, he scored his first two goals for Fenerbahçe against Altay. On 17 October 2011, he scored a goal against Mersin İdman Yurdu from 48 metres.

=== Kasımpaşa ===
On 25 August 2012, Hurmacı joined Kasımpaşa.

On 12 March 2022, he announced his retirement out of professional football via his social media account.

== International career ==
Holding both Turkish and German citizenship, Hurmacı was free for both nations to be selected into their youth national teams. Eventually he was called up twice to the Turkey national U17 team in 2005. Subsequently, U21 manager Hami Mandıralı promoted Özer to the U21 squad where he has been capped six times.

== Style of play ==
Hurmacı was notable for his dribbling, and vision on the pitch. Quick on the ball and playable to both wings on the pitch.

== Honours ==
Fenerbahçe

- Süper Lig: 2010–11
- Turkish Super Cup: 2009
- Turkish Cup: 2011–12
