= Gökhan Gönül =

Turkish footballer

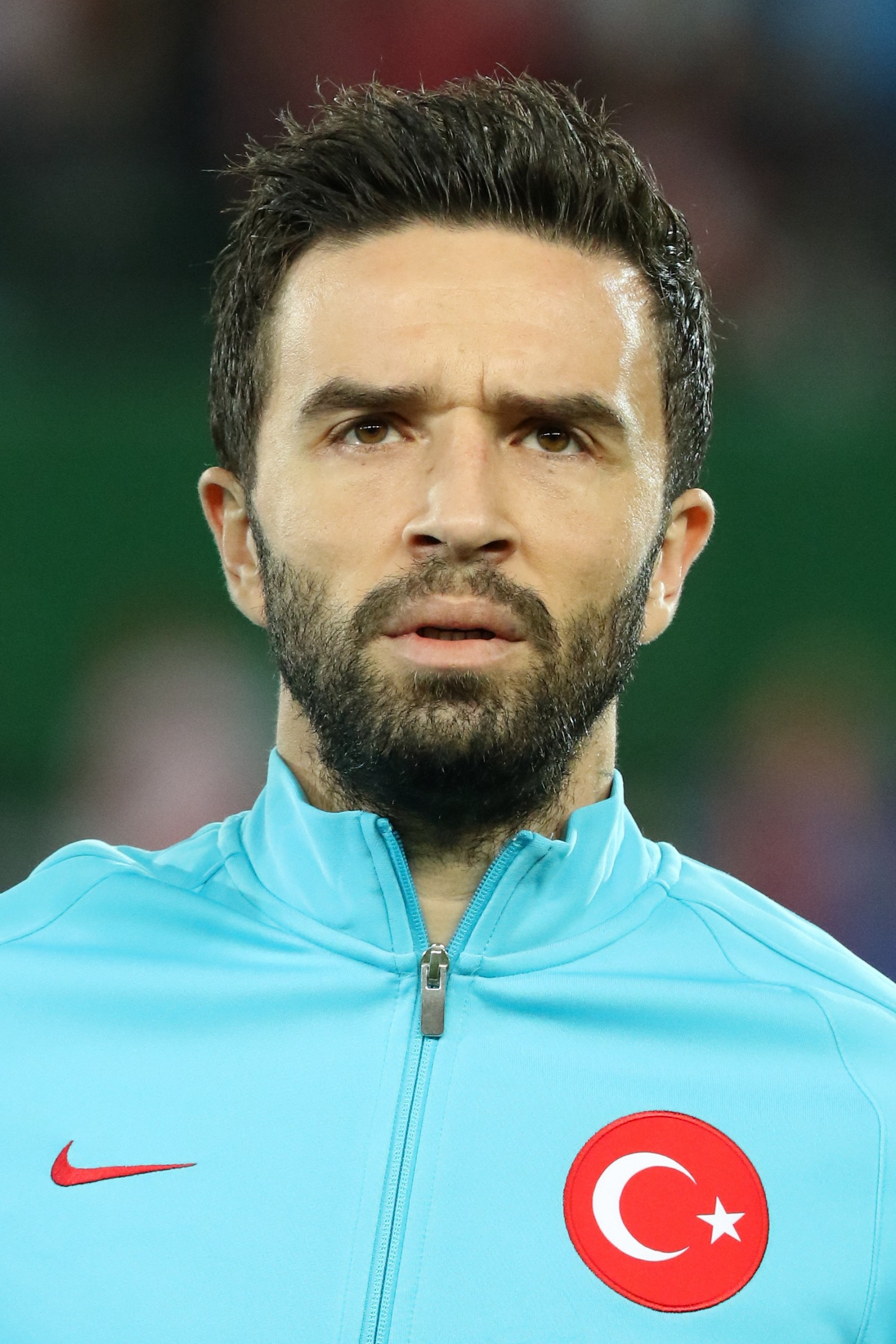
- Gökhan Gönül with Turkey in 2016

Personal information
- Date of birth: 4 January 1985 (age 41)
- Place of birth: Samsun, Turkey
- Height: 1.77 m (5 ft 9 1/2 in)
- Position: Right back

Youth career
- 1999–2002: Bursayolspor
- 2002–2003: Gençlerbirliği

Senior career*
Years	Team	Apps	(Gls)
2002–2007	Gençlerbirliği	0	(0)
2003–2007	→ Hacettepe (loan)	92	(15)
2007–2016	Fenerbahçe	254	(10)
2016–2020	Beşiktaş	113	(8)
2020–2021	Fenerbahçe	21	(2)
2021–2023	Çaykur Rizespor	30	(1)

International career
2007–2019	Turkey	66	(1)

Managerial career
- 2024–2025: Turkey U-21
- 2025: Fenerbahçe (assistant)
- * Club domestic league appearances and goals

Gökhan Gönül (born 4 January 1985) is a Turkish former professional footballer who played as a right back.

== Early life ==
Gönül was born in Bafra, Samsun, where he and his family lived before moving to Bursa when Gönül was six years old. His uncle signed him up with Bursayolspor's youth squad in 1999, and Gönül began his footballing career as a goalkeeper. However, after several other young goalkeepers signed with the club, Gönül was moved to the outfield. After putting in several performances, Gönül was told he would not play goalkeeper again. At first, Gönül played football as a hobby and something to play when there was nothing else to do. He began taking the sport more seriously when his coach at the time, Mehmet Kirazoğlu, took him under his wing and trained him individually. Soon after, Gönül played in a senior match against 30-year-olds; Gönül was 13 at the time.

Gönül played several positions before he could find his spot, lacing up as a libero, midfielder, and forward at various levels. Gönül was the captain of the 14-16 team at Bursayolspor, and helped the club to a 3–3 draw with Bursaspor, scoring three goals while playing libero. Hasan Bora, a staff member at Bursaspor at the time, was interested in signing Gönül after his performance. However, after seeing several of his peers join the club and fail to progress, Gönül took it as a sign and decided against joining the club. Fatih Terim, then coach of Galatasaray, also expressed interest in Gönül. He invited the youngster to Istanbul, but Gönül ultimately did not agree to join the team. Instead, he signed with Gençlerbirliği on 9 August 2002.

== Club career ==
Gönül began his career with the Ankara-based club in the A2 league. In his first season, he scored two goals in 19 A2 league appearances. The following season, Gönül was loaned out to feeder club Hacettepe. He spent the 2003–04 season on loan, before joining the club on a full transfer at the end of the season. In his first two seasons with the club, Gönül scored eight goals in 48 appearances and helped the club to back-to-back promotions. Gençlerbirliği transferred him back to the club at the start of the 2005–06. However, an injury kept him sidelined for several months and he was unable to make his debut for the club. Instead, he was loaned out once more to Hacettepe at the winter break. Gönül helped the club to another promotion, completing three promotions in four years. He also won the award for Best Player of the TFF First League.

Fenerbahçe transferred him before the start of the 2007–08 season, where he flourished under then-coach Zico. After putting in performances during the 2007–08 UEFA Champions League, he earned the nickname "Turkish Cafu". The club reached the quarter-finals of the UEFA Champions League for the first time in club history. Gökhan Gönül extended to his contract in June 2012. The new deal will see him at the club until the 2015–16 and take home €1.7 million per season.

=== Retirement ===
On 19 June 2023, Gönül announced on his social media account that he ended his football career at the age of 38.

== International career ==
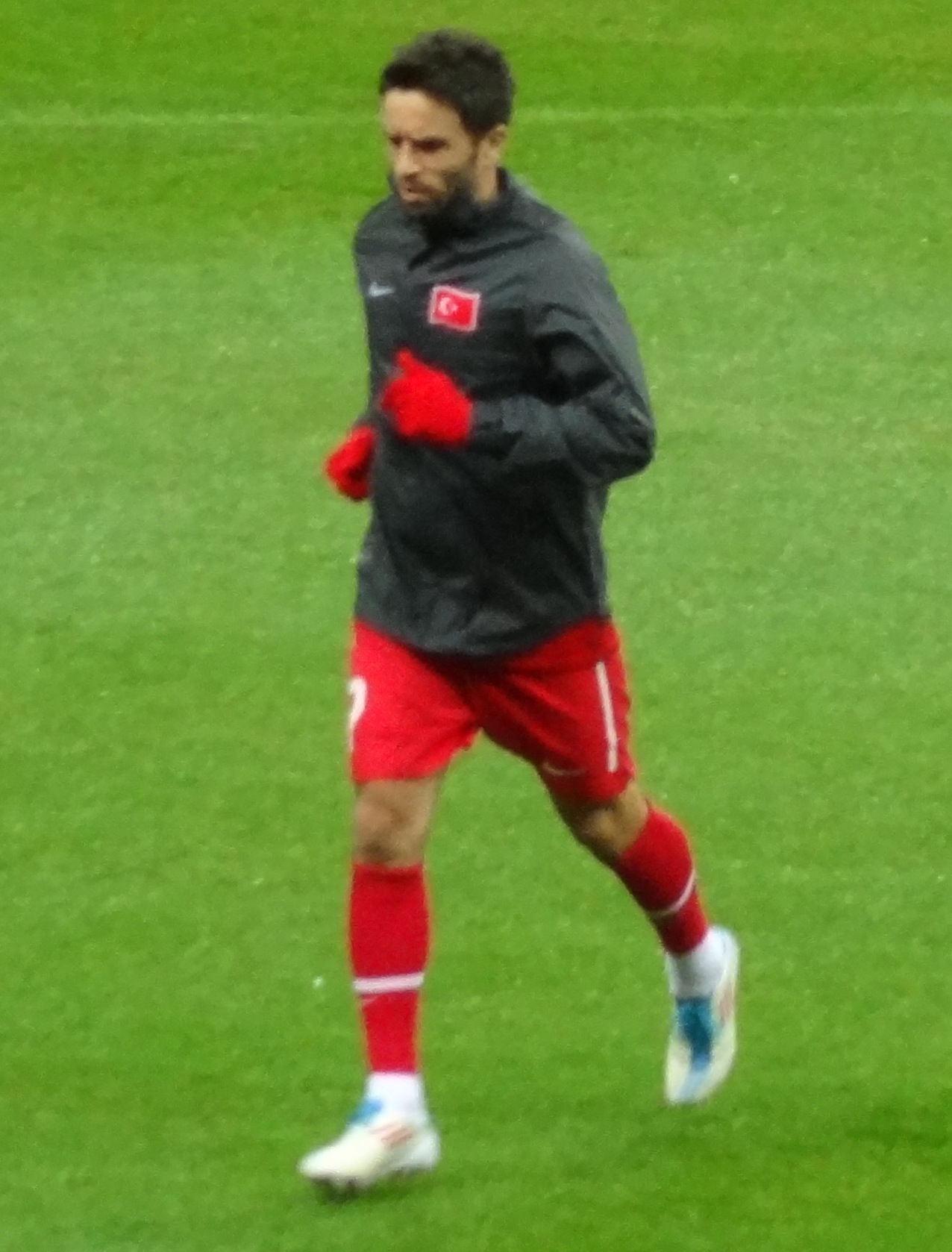
Gökhan Gönül with Turkey in November 2011

Gönül was never capped at youth international level. He made his senior debut against Norway on 27 November 2007. He made three more appearances that season, but was not selected in the Euro 2008 squad due to his injury.

Gönül was called up to the Turkey squad for Euro 2016.

== Managerial career ==
Gönül was appointed as the assistant coach of the Turkey national under-21 football team on 19 March 2024. After serving as the assistant coach for 5 matches, he became the head coach of the Turkey U-21 on 26 September 2024.

== Honours ==
Fenerbahçe S.K.

- Süper Lig: 2010–11, 2013–14
- Turkish Cup: 2011–12, 2012–13
- Turkish Super Cup: 2007, 2009, 2014

Beşiktaş J.K.

- Süper Lig: 2016–17

=== Individual ===
- Süper Lig Defender of the Season: 2010–11
- Süper Lig Team of the Season: 2015–16, 2016–17

== Career statistics ==
=== Club ===
Club	Season	League			Cup (Note: Includes Turkish Super Cup)		Europe		Total	
Club	Season	Division	Apps	Goals	Apps	Goals	Apps	Goals	Apps	Goals
Hacettepe	2003–04	TFF First League	27	5	-	-	—		27	5
Hacettepe	2004–05	TFF First League	21	3	-	-	—		21	3
Hacettepe	2005–06	TFF First League	17	3	-	-	—-		17	3
Hacettepe	2006–07	TFF First League	27	4	2	0	—		29	4
Hacettepe	Total		92	15	2	0	—		94	15
Fenerbahçe	2007–08	Süper Lig	24	0	4	1	8	0	36	1
Fenerbahçe	2008–09	Süper Lig	29	0	7	0	10	0	46	0
Fenerbahçe	2009–10	Süper Lig	30	2	6	0	8	0	44	2
Fenerbahçe	2010–11	Süper Lig	30	3	2	0	3	0	35	3
Fenerbahçe	2011–12	Süper Lig	31	1	2	0	—		33	1
Fenerbahçe	2012–13	Süper Lig	27	3	2	1	13	0	42	4
Fenerbahçe	2013–14	Süper Lig	29	0	0	0	2	0	31	0
Fenerbahçe	2014–15	Süper Lig	32	0	3	0	0	0	35	0
Fenerbahçe	2015–16	Süper Lig	22	1	1	0	6	0	29	1
Fenerbahçe	Total		254	10	27	2	50	0	331	12
Beşiktaş	2016–17	Süper Lig	29	1	2	0	7	0	38	1
Beşiktaş	2017–18	Süper Lig	25	0	4	0	3	0	32	0
Beşiktaş	2018–19	Süper Lig	29	3	0	0	9	1	38	4
Beşiktaş	2019–20	Süper Lig	30	4	1	0	1	0	32	4
Beşiktaş	Total		113	8	7	0	20	1	140	9
Fenerbahçe	2020–21	Süper Lig	21	2	1	0	—		22	2
Çaykur Rizespor	2021–22	Süper Lig	25	1	0	0	—		25	1
Çaykur Rizespor	2022–23	TFF First League	5	0	0	0	—		5	0
Çaykur Rizespor	Total		30	1	0	0	—		30	1
Career total			510	36	37	2	70	1	617	39
Last Update: 17 September 2022

=== International ===
Turkey national team
Year	Apps	Goals
2007	2	0
2008	6	0
2009	9	0
2010	5	0
2011	5	1
2012	4	0
2013	9	0
2014	8	0
2015	5	0
2016	8	0
2017	3	0
2018	1	0
2019	1	0
Total	66	1

=== International goals ===
Scores and results list Turkey's goal tally first.

#	Date	Venue	Opponent	Score	Result	Competition
1.	29 March 2011	Şükrü Saracoğlu Stadium, Istanbul, Turkey	Austria	2–0	2–0	UEFA Euro 2012 qualification
