= Yasin Çakmak =

Turkish footballer

Personal information
- Date of birth: January 6, 1985 (age 41)
- Place of birth: Rize, Turkey
- Height: 1.86 m (6 ft 1 in)
- Position: Centre-back

Youth career
- 1999–2003: Çaykur Rizespor

Senior career*
Years	Team	Apps	(Gls)
2003–2007	Çaykur Rizespor	86	(2)
2007–2009	Fenerbahçe	27	(0)
2009–2010	Sivasspor	22	(0)
2010–2013	Denizlispor	38	(0)
2013–2014	Giresunspor	1	(0)
2015	Tokatspor	2	(0)

International career
2004–2005	Turkey U20	11	(1)
2006	Turkey U21	4	(0)
2006	Turkey	1	(0)
2006	Turkey A2	1	(0)
- * Club domestic league appearances and goals

Yasin Çakmak (born January 6, 1985, in Rize, Turkey) is a Turkish former professional football player.

== Club career ==
On August 3, 2007, Yasin completed his move to Fenerbahçe S.K. July 8, 2009, Yasin Çakmak was sent To Sivasspor in exchange for Fabio Bilica and €2 million.

During his spell at Giresunspor, Çakmak picked up a long time injury in 2014. In 2015, Çakmak retired from professional football at the age of 30.

== International career ==
Yasin was called up to the Turkey national football team for EURO 2008 qualifiers in March 2007. His first cap came on April 12, 2006, against Azerbaijan.
