= İlhan Parlak =

Turkish footballer

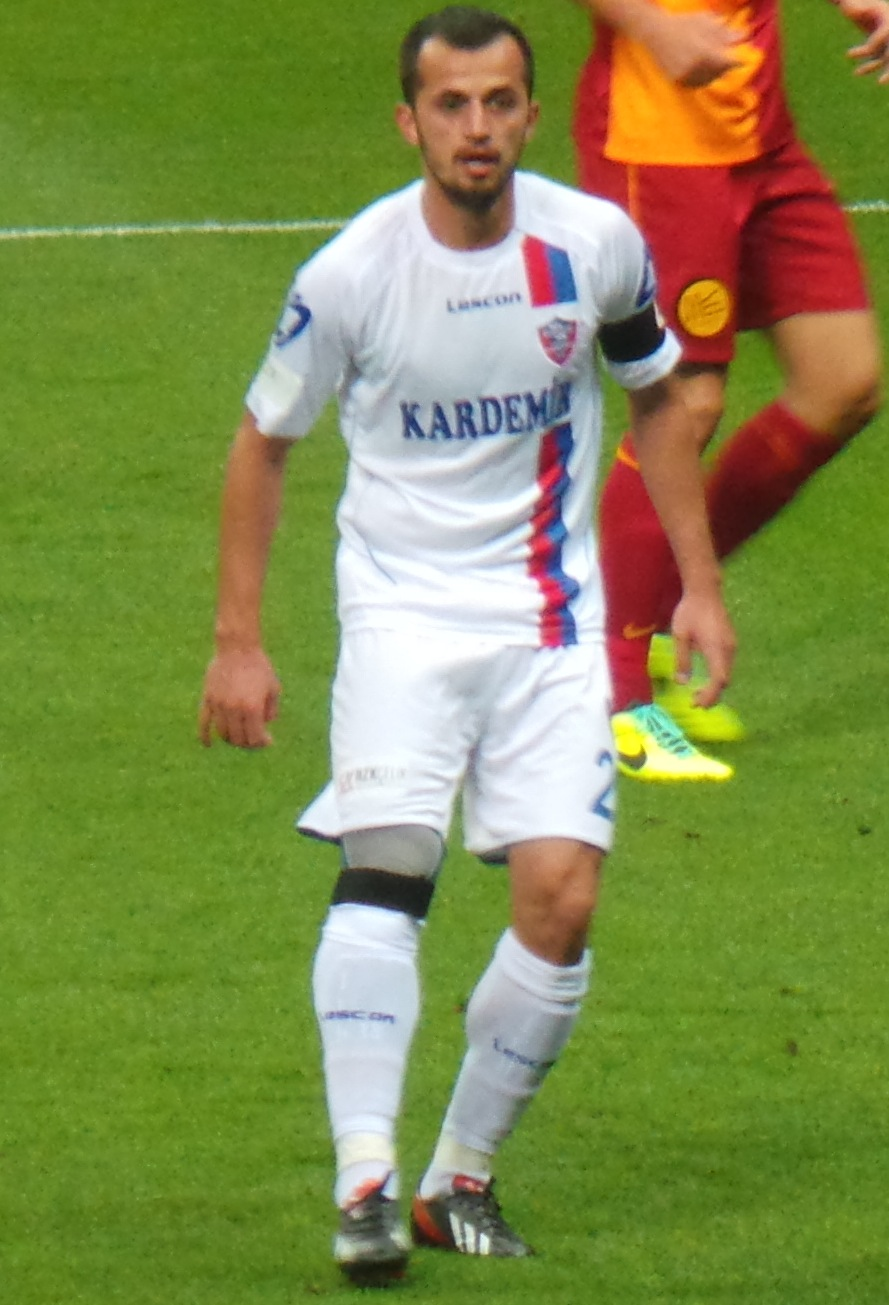
- Parlak with Karabükspor in October 2013

Personal information
- Full name: İlhan Parlak
- Date of birth: 18 January 1987 (age 39)
- Place of birth: Yahyalı, Turkey
- Height: 1.81 m (5 ft 11 in)
- Position: Forward

Senior career*
Years	Team	Apps	(Gls)
2004–2007	Kayserispor	52	(7)
2007–2009	Fenerbahçe	10	(2)
2009–2010	Ankaraspor	4	(0)
2009–2010	→ Ankaragücü (loan)	8	(2)
2010–2014	Karabükspor	119	(30)
2014–2015	Kayseri Erciyesspor	16	(0)
2016–2017	Gaziantepspor	38	(4)
2017–2020	Ankaragücü	97	(19)
2020–2023	Kayserispor	86	(13)

International career
2005–2007	Turkey U21	35	(16)
- * Club domestic league appearances and goals as of 28 August 2023

İlhan Parlak (born 19 January 1987) is a Turkish professional footballer who plays as a forward.

== Club career ==
In July 2007, Parlak was bought by Fenerbahçe from Kayserispor and signed a five-year contract. It was speculated that Real Madrid and Valencia also wanted to sign him in the 2007–08 transfer season. On 14 June, Parlak was transferred to Ankaraspor along with Özgür Çek and €4.2 million in return for Özer Hurmacı.

He is famous for his quick goal (scored in 15 seconds) against Sivasspor at the 32nd week of the 2005–06 season.

Parlak left Kayseri Erciyesspor in the 2015–16 winter transfer window.

== International career ==
In the 2006 European U19 Championships, despite Turkey disappointing their fans by losing all three of their group stage encounters, Parlak was crowned with the golden boot at the tournament scoring five goals in three appearances.
