= Abdülkadir Kayalı =

Turkish footballer

Personal information
- Date of birth: 30 January 1991 (age 35)
- Place of birth: Ankara, Turkey
- Height: 1.78 m (5 ft 10 in)
- Position: Central midfielder

Youth career
- 2001–2006: Ankaragücü

Senior career*
Years	Team	Apps	(Gls)
2007–2009	Ankaragücü	1	(0)
2009–2011	Fenerbahçe	0	(0)
2010–2011	→ Istanbul B.B. (loan)	21	(0)
2011–2013	Orduspor	19	(0)
2013–2014	Boluspor	19	(1)
2014–2017	Gaziantepspor	55	(1)
2017–2018	Ankaragücü	11	(0)
2018–2019	Giresunspor	4	(0)
2019	Elazığspor	9	(0)
2019–2021	Balıkesirspor	23	(0)

International career
2006	Turkey U15	4	(1)
2006–2007	Turkey U16	20	(1)
2007–2008	Turkey U17	20	(1)
2008	Turkey U18	1	(0)
2009	Turkey U19	5	(0)
2010	Turkey U20	2	(0)
2010–2011	Turkey U21	6	(0)
2012–2013	Turkey B	8	(0)
- * Club domestic league appearances and goals as of 20 January 2021

Abdülkadir Kayalı (born 30 January 1991) is a Turkish footballer.

== Career ==
=== Ankaragücü ===
He was in the eyes of two English teams: Chelsea F.C. and Manchester City, and also had a trial with the latter club in the year 2007 and impressed, but due to being under 16 at the time a deal was not done. In Ankaragücü, he was taken out of the squad because he said he wouldn't extend his contract until he turned 18.

=== Fenerbahçe ===
He left Ankaragücü on 3 January 2009 and moved to Fenerbahçe, signing a 4,5 year contract. He got the number 91 from his birth year (1991). On 23 December 2009 he made his debut against Altay in the Turkish Cup, coming on off the bench to replace Özer Hurmacı.

On 30 December 2009 Istanbul B.B. has signed Abdülkadir on loan from Fenerbahce for one and a half year.

=== Eskişehirspor ===
Kayali was transferred to Eskişehirspor after Sezer Öztürk was to Fenerbahçe.

=== Orduspor ===
Kayali was transferred to Orduspor after was to Eskişehirspor.

=== Elazığspor ===
On the last day of the January transfer market 2019, Kayalı was one of 22 players on two hours, that signed for Turkish club Elazığspor. had been placed under a transfer embargo but managed to negotiate it with the Turkish FA, leading to them going on a mad spree of signing and registering a load of players despite not even having a permanent manager in place. In just two hours, they managed to snap up a record 22 players - 12 coming in on permanent contracts and a further 10 joining on loan deals until the end of the season.

== International ==
He played 58 international games for many youth teams from Turkey.

He was also listed as one of the Top 10 players of the UEFA U-17 Championship Tournament in a recent UEFA article.
