= Fábio Bilica =

Brazilian footballer (born 1979)

Bilica
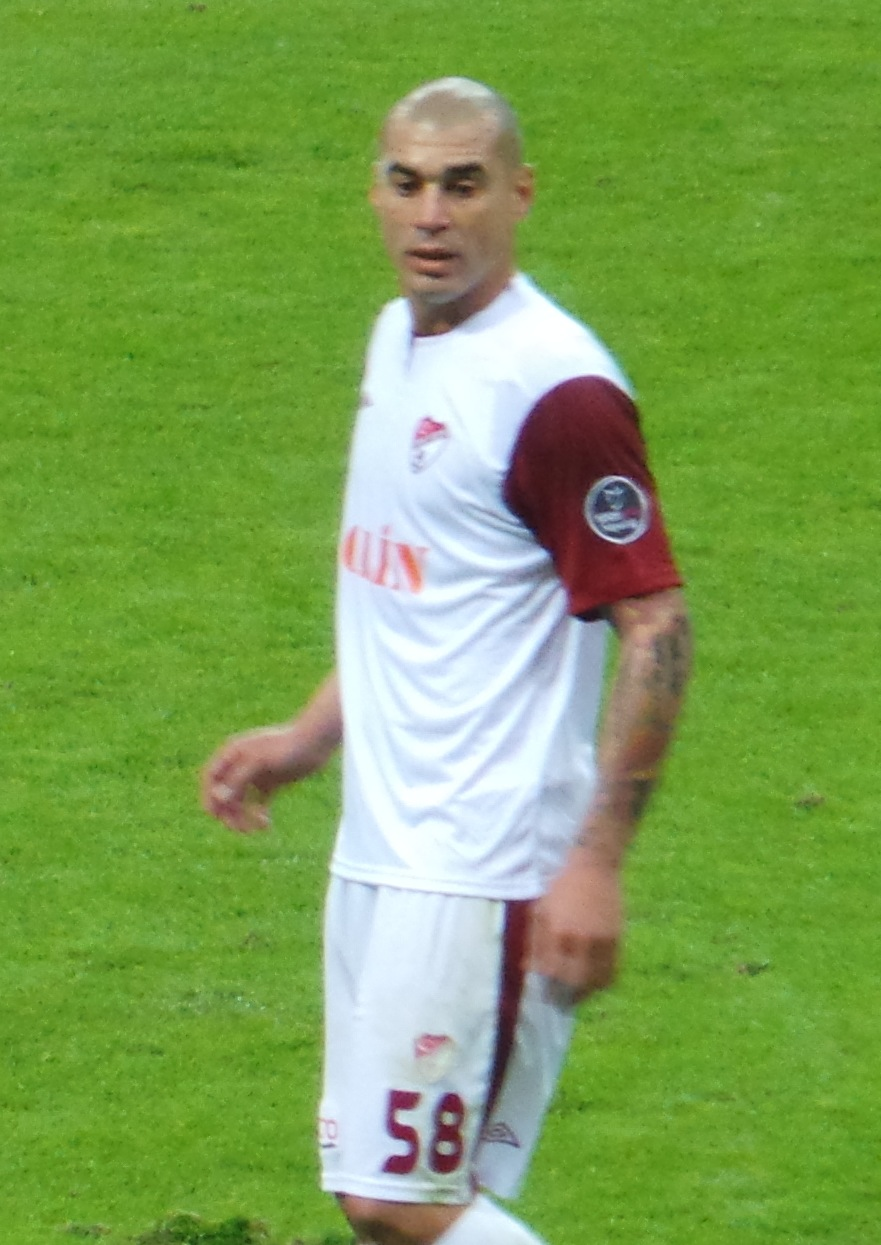
- Bilica in 2013

Personal information
- Full name: Fábio Alves da Silva
- Date of birth: 4 January 1979 (age 47)
- Place of birth: Campina Grande, Brazil
- Height: 1.87 m (6 ft 2 in)
- Position: Centre-back

Senior career*
Years	Team	Apps	(Gls)
1996–1998	Vitória	10	(2)
1998–2002	Venezia	75	(1)
2002–2004	Palermo	12	(0)
2003	→ Brescia (loan)	11	(0)
2003–2004	→ Ancona (loan)	16	(1)
2004	Goiás	0	(0)
2004	Grêmio	24	(1)
2005	1. FC Köln	15	(0)
2006–2007	Istres	41	(2)
2007–2008	Universitatea Cluj	17	(0)
2008–2009	Sivasspor	34	(1)
2009–2012	Fenerbahçe	46	(1)
2012–2015	Elazığspor	73	(1)
2017	Auto Esporte	0	(0)
2017	São Paulo Crystal	0	(0)
2018	Atlético-PB	0	(0)
2019	Batatais	0	(0)
2019	Miramar	0	(0)
2020	América-SE	0	(0)
2020–?	São Francisco-AC	0	(0)

International career
1999–2000	Brazil U-23	16	(2)
- * Club domestic league appearances and goals

Fábio Alves da Silva (born 4 January 1979), commonly known as Bilica, is a Brazilian former professional footballer who played as a centre-back.

== Club career ==
Bilica is infamous for his statement during his time at Venezia when, during a game against Brescia, he claimed that he would break the legs of Roberto Baggio. Baggio wound up getting injured and stayed on the sidelines for several months, but the tackle was made by Antonio Marasco.

While playing for Venezia during the 1999–2000 Serie A season, Bilica replaced the goalkeeper who had been sent off, then saved a penalty from AC Milan striker Andriy Shevchenko.

Bilica made his debut at Bahia. He then later played for clubs including Palermo, 1. FC Köln and many more.

In 2004, Bilica was approached by Goiás Esporte Clube, as part of the manager Celso Roth's preparations for the 2004 Campeonato Brasileiro Série A. However, the negotiations with the Goiânia club did not go as expected. Bilica was then signed by the Porto Alegre club Grêmio. At Grêmio, Fábio Bilica was part of the squad that was relegated to the Série B. In a disastrous campaign, Grêmio was virtually relegated with four rounds to go to the end of the season, and Bilica was dismissed by the team after problems with the club, such as a verbal altercation with heckling fans, arguments with the coach Cláudio Duarte, and the poor campaign and financial conditions of the club. Bilica was released by the club after the end of the season, amidst problems with the club president, Paulo Odone, and allegations of indiscipline and improper conduct.

In November 2007, he arrived in Romania at Universitatea Cluj. There, he played in 17 matches, including the last game of the season, the Cluj derby against CFR Cluj. In that game, Bilica fouled an opponent in his own penalty area, allowing CFR Cluj to score the winning goal. After this match, it was suspected that he did not play fair against CFR Cluj, helping them to win the Romanian championship instead of Steaua Bucharest. He later stated in an interview that he was contacted by some players from CFR Cluj three days before the match who tried to convince him to "take it easy" against them, telling him they have a lot of money for him, but he refused.

Bilica signed for Sivasspor in July 2008 and caught the attention of Fenerbahçe. He later signed with Fenerbahçe on 8 June 2009 in exchange for Yasin Çakmak and €1.5 million.

== International career ==
Bilica was a member of the Brazil Olympic team at the 2000 Summer Olympics in Sydney, where he reached the quarter finals. Brazil lost to Cameroon in the quarter-finals. He played in the Olympic squad alongside much more famous players, such as Ronaldinho, Lúcio and Fábio Aurélio.

== Honours ==
Fenerbahçe

- Süper Lig: 2010–11
- Turkish Cup: 2011–12
- Turkish Super Cup: 2009
