= Uğur Boral =

Turkish footballer

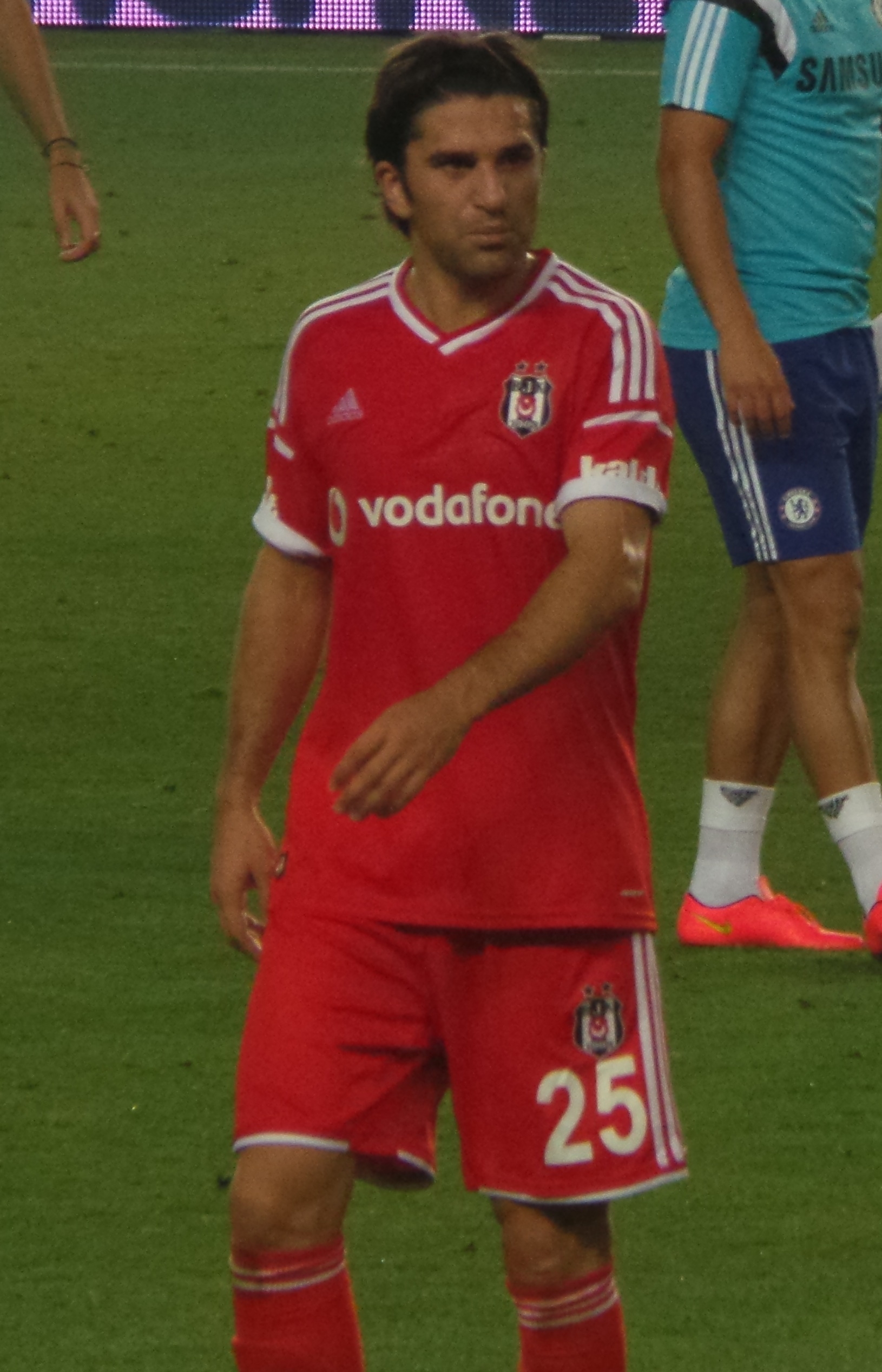

Personal information
- Full name: Uğur Boral
- Date of birth: 14 April 1982 (age 44)
- Place of birth: Istanbul, Turkey
- Height: 1.78 m (5 ft 10 in)
- Positions: Left winger; left back

Senior career*
Years	Team	Apps	(Gls)
2000–2006	Gençlerbirliği	59	(10)
2001–2002	→ Kocaelispor (loan)	19	(2)
2003–2004	→ Ankaraspor (loan)	14	(1)
2006–2011	Fenerbahçe	84	(7)
2011–2012	Samsunspor	10	(1)
2012–2015	Beşiktaş	26	(1)
Total		212	(22)

International career
2005–2008	Turkey	11	(1)
- * Club domestic league appearances and goals as of 7 August 2015

Uğur Boral (born 14 April 1982) is a Turkish retired footballer who last played for Beşiktaş in the Süper Lig.

Boral was known as a playmaker and was noted for occasionally scoring with unexpected shots. He is naturally left-footed and could play either as a left-sided midfielder or, when required, as a left-back.

== Club career ==
Boral began his career in 1995, when he signed with the amateur club Gaziosmanpaşa Karadenizspor. In 1998, he moved to Alibeyköyspor. He was transferred to Gençlerbirliği during the 2000–01 season after his stay with Kocaelispor. In 2006, Boral signed with Fenerbahçe, where he was given the number 25 shirt. He scored two goals on his Champions League debut against CSKA Moscow on Matchday 6 of the 2007–08 season.

Boral signed a 1-year contract for Fenerbahçe, until 2012. Boral played shortly for Samsunspor in 2012, before returning to Beşiktaş for the time between 2012 and 2015. He retired in 2015.

== International career ==
=== Euro 2008 ===
He was called up to Turkey's Euro 2008 squad and started the semi-final against Germany on 25 June 2008 at St. Jakob-Park, Basel. He scored the opening goal, which was also his first for Turkey. Turkey eventually lost 3–2.

=== International goal ===
#	Date	Venue	Opponent	Score	Result	Competition
1.	25 June 2008	St. Jakob-Park, Basel, Switzerland	Germany	1–0	2–3	UEFA Euro 2008

== Honours ==
Fenerbahçe

- Süper Lig: 2006–07, 2010–11
- Süper Kupa: 2007, 2009

Turkey

- UEFA European Championship bronze medalist: 2008

== Prosecution ==
In the aftermath of the attempted coup d'état of July 2016 he was accused of being involved in the Gülen movement. On January 2020 Boral was sentenced to 2 years and 3 months imprisonment for being a member of an armed terror organization due to his links to the Gülen movement.
