= Deniz Barış =

Turkish footballer (born 1977)

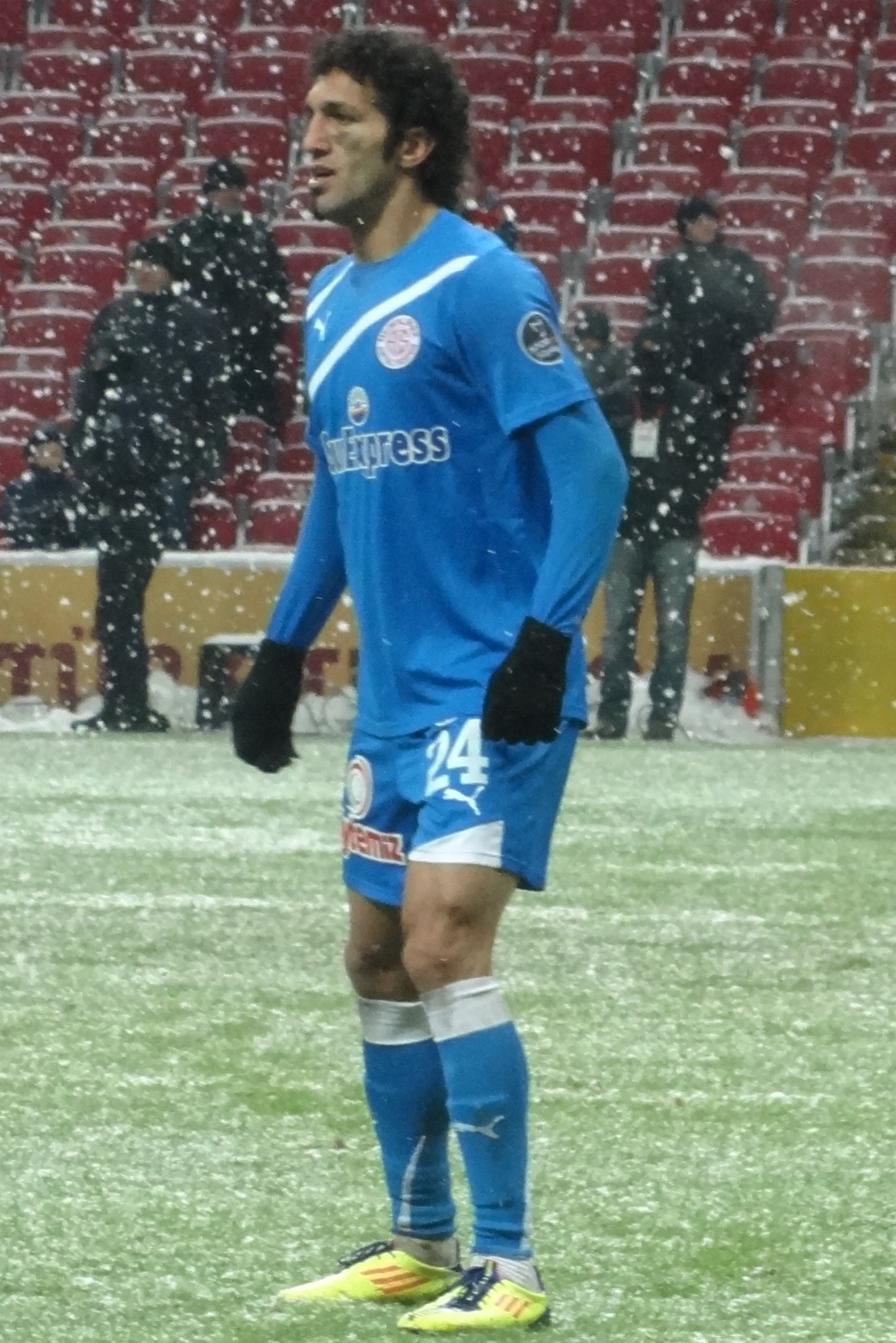
- Barış with Antalyaspor

Personal information
- Date of birth: 2 July 1977 (age 49)
- Place of birth: Kemah, Turkey
- Height: 1.84 m (6 ft 0 in)
- Positions: Defensive midfielder; centre-back

Senior career*
Years	Team	Apps	(Gls)
–1999	SV Este 06/70		
1999–2002	FC St. Pauli	38	(1)
2002–2004	Gençlerbirliği	57	(4)
2004–2010	Fenerbahçe	102	(2)
2010–2014	Antalyaspor	95	(2)

International career
2003–2007	Turkey	21	(0)
- * Club domestic league appearances and goals

Deniz Barış (born 2 July 1977) is a Turkish former professional footballer who played as a defensive midfielder or centre-back.

== Career ==
Born in Kemah, Turkey, Barış played for SV Este 06/70 in his youth. He had an important role when FC St. Pauli was promoted to the Bundesliga in 2001.

After his years at St. Pauli, he attracted the attention of the Gençlerbirliği chairman İlhan Cavcav and he was transferred to Gençlerbirliği. In Gençlerbirliği's UEFA Cup campaign, he was one of the most influential players of the team. His team defeated European clubs such as Blackburn Rovers and Sporting CP.

In 2004, Fenerbahçe's chairman signed Barış to his team paying one of the Gençlerbirliği's record transfer fees.

Barış was a member of the Turkey national team's squad at the 2003 FIFA Confederations Cup.

== Personal life ==
Due to a financial problem in his transfer to Fenerbahçe, Barış's licence was suspended and he was unable to play for the Kadıköy side for a long time.

In July 2006, he lost his childhood love and mother of his two children Frauke Barış in a tragic house accident in his house in Jork near Hamburg, Germany. During their match following this event, F.C. St. Pauli players wore black armbands to express their sorrow for the ex-St. Pauli player.

== Honours ==
Fenerbahçe

- Süper Lig: 2004–05, 2006–07
- Süper Kupa: 2007

Turkey

- FIFA Confederations Cup: third place: 2003
