= Önder Turacı =

Turkish footballer

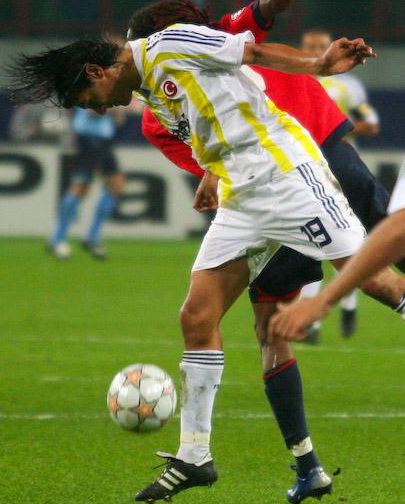
- Turacı playing for Fenerbahçe in 2007

Personal information
- Full name: Önder Turacı
- Date of birth: 14 July 1981 (age 45)
- Place of birth: Liège, Belgium
- Height: 1.86 m (6 ft 1 in)
- Positions: Centre-back; right-back

Youth career
- 1986–1995: Club Ligue
- 1995–1998: Tilleur Liège

Senior career*
| Years | Team | Apps | (Gls) |
| 1998–2004 | Standard Liège | 64 | (3) |
| 2000 | → Visé (loan) | 18 | (0) |
| 2000–2002 | → La Louvière (loan) | 49 | (2) |
| 2004–2010 | Fenerbahçe | 121 | (5) |
| 2010–2011 | Kayserispor | 26 | (1) |
| 2012 | Göztepe | 15 | (0) |
| 2013–2014 | Sarıyer | 10 | (1) |
| 2014 | Şanlıurfaspor | 10 | (2) |
| 2014–2015 | Antalyaspor | 0 | (0) |

International career^{‡}
| 1998–1999 | Belgium U18 | 16 | (1) |
| 2000 | Belgium U19 | 1 | (0) |
| 2001–2003 | Belgium U21 | 14 | (2) |
| 2004–2009 | Turkey | 4 | (0) |
- * Club domestic league appearances and goals as of 1 September 2014 ‡ National team caps and goals as of 16:03, 16 April 2015 (UTC)

Önder Turacı (Turkish pronunciation: [ˈœndæɾ tuˈɾaːdʒɯ]; born 14 July 1981) is a Turkish former footballer who played as a defender.

== International career ==
Turacı was a Belgian U-21s and played in the 2002 UEFA European Under-21 Football Championship. He was included in the squad of Turkish senior team in series of friendlies in summer 2004, and made his debut on 18 August 2004, a friendly match against Belarus.

At that time the new FIFA status was in force since 1 January 2004, and had loosened the nationality transfer of players aged under 21. A provision clause of 1 year effectiveness also came in force that any player who already played for one nation youth side, but not the senior, had a chance to apply for nationality transfer, regardless of their age. Any players that already were allowed to play in official match on a senior team, means the transfer was automatically done. But in Turacı case, his transfer was uncertain, and Belgian senior team once tried to recall him in February 2006. After the rule change by FIFA, he was able to play on the Turkey national team in 2009.

== Honours ==
- 2005 Turkish Super League National Champions with Fenerbahçe
- 2007 Turkish Super League National Champions with Fenerbahçe
