= Ali Çamdalı =

German footballer (born 1984)

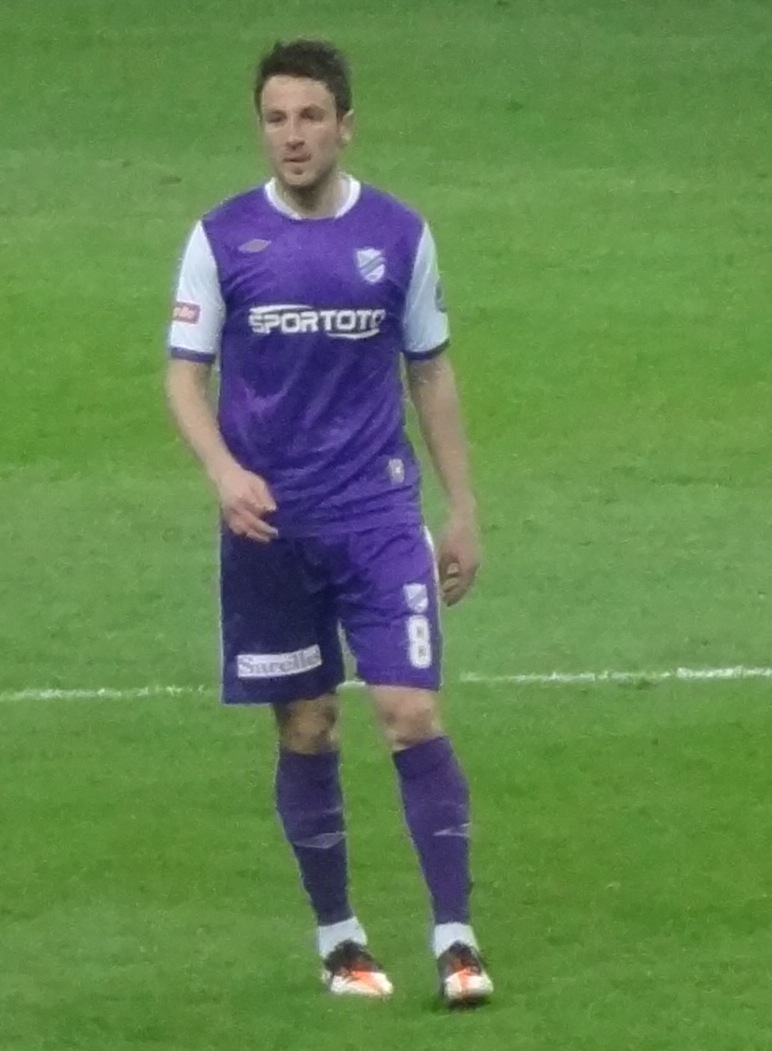
- Çamdalı in 2012

Personal information
- Date of birth: 22 February 1984 (age 42)
- Place of birth: Duisburg, West Germany
- Height: 1.86 m (6 ft 1 in)
- Positions: Defensive midfielder; centre back

Youth career
- GSG Duisburg
- Duisburger FV 08
- Borussia Mönchengladbach

Senior career*
Years	Team	Apps	(Gls)
2003–2005	Borussia Mönchengladbach II	59	(7)
2005–2007	Bayer Leverkusen II	60	(0)
2007–2008	Kayserispor	8	(2)
2008–2009	Kayseri Erciyesspor	31	(5)
2009–2010	Kocaelispor	10	(0)
2010–2013	Orduspor	90	(8)
2013–2018	Konyaspor	91	(6)
2018–2019	Çaykur Rizespor	11	(1)
2019	Konyaspor	5	(0)
2020	Manisa	8	(1)
Total		373	(30)

Managerial career
- 2023–2024: Konyaspor (sporting director)
- 2024: Konyaspor
- * Club domestic league appearances and goals

Ali Çamdalı (born 22 February 1984) is a Turkish football coach who most recently managed Süper Lig club Konyaspor and former player who played as a midfielder, spending most of his career in Turkey.

== Career ==
Born in Duisburg, West Germany, Çamdalı played youth football for local clubs GSG Duisburg and Duisburger FV 08. In 2016 he captained Süper Lig club Konyaspor. In June 2017, he played in the final of the 2016–17 Turkish Cup, which Konyaspor won against İstanbul Başakşehir.

=== Coaching ===
Çamdalı became Konyaspor's head coach on April 29, 2024. His tenure was terminated on October 28, 2024.

== Honours ==
Kayserispor

- Turkish Cup: 2008

Konyaspor

- Turkish Cup: 2016–17
- Turkish Super Cup: 2017
