= 2013 Turkish Super Cup =

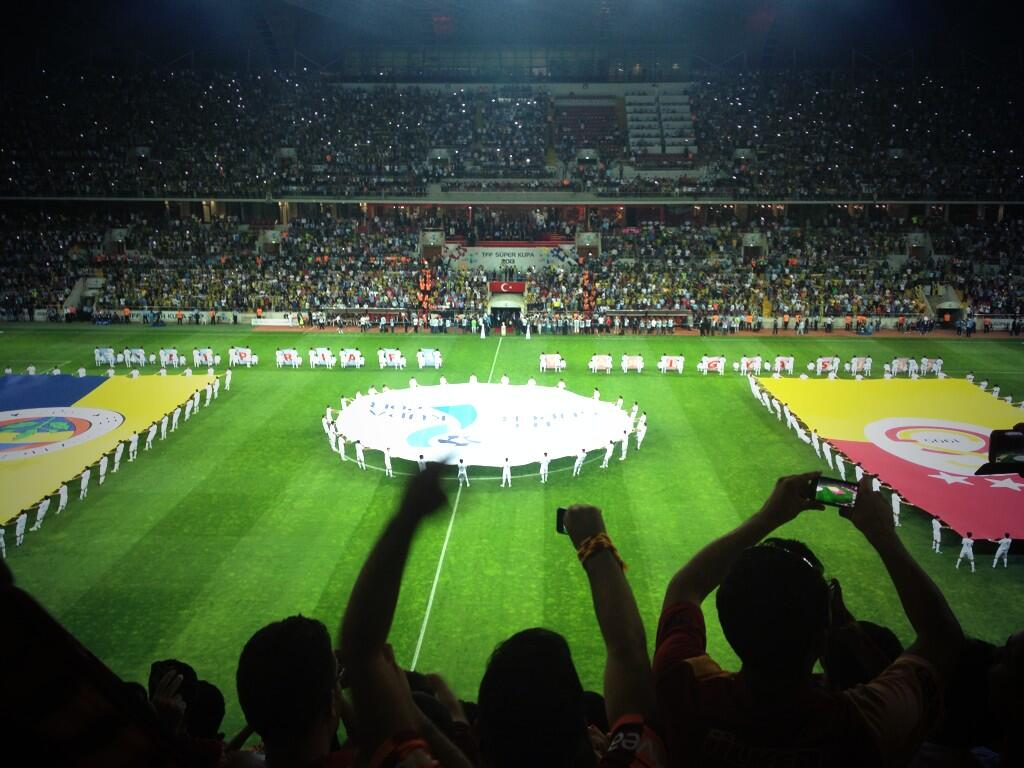
- Event: Turkish Super Cup
Galatasaray	Fenerbahçe
1	0
- Date: 11 August 2013
- Venue: Kadir Has Stadium, Kayseri
- Man of the Match: Mert Günok
- Referee: Bülent Yıldırım
- Attendance: 32,000
- Weather: Fine

2013 Turkish Super Cup (Turkish: TFF Süper Kupa) was the 40th edition of the Turkish Super Cup since its establishment as Presidential Cup in 1966. The match was contested between the 2012–13 Süper Lig champions Galatasaray and the 2012–13 Turkish Cup winners Fenerbahçe, making the game the 375th edition of Kıtalar Arası Derbi. The game was a rematch of the 2012 Turkish Super Cup, which was won by title holders Galatasaray.

== Background ==
This will be the 5th overall national super cup matchup between the teams since 1966, and the second matchup since 2006, when the cup was rebranded as TFF Süper Kupa. Galatasaray last won the cup in 2012 against Fenerbahçe, and Fenerbahçe last won the cup in 2009 against Beşiktaş. In their previous finals, both teams won twice. Galatasaray in 1996 and 2012, and Fenerbahçe in 1973 and 1985.

== Path to the final ==
Galatasaray were champions in the regular season, finishing ten points ahead of Fenerbahçe. In the regular season, Galatasaray collected 71 points by 21 wins, 8 draws and 5 losses. They were trailed by Fenerbahçe, who collected 61 points by 18 wins, 7 draws and 9 losses.

Although runners-up of the league, Fenerbahçe performed better in the domestic cup. They entered the tournament at the fourth round. They won their fourth round match against Pendikspor. In the fifth round, they beat Göztepe. In the group stage they were drawn against Sivasspor, 1461 Trabzon, and Bursaspor but were winners in the group. The semi-finals were the toughest home and away matches for Fenerbahçe, as they struggled against Eskişehirspor but were winners after a penalty shoot-out. In the 2013 Turkish Cup Final they were crowned champions against rivals Trabzonspor by a decisive 1–0 win. This was a consecutive win for Fenerbahçe, as they were title holders of the 2012 Turkish Cup Final.

== Match ==
=== Details ===
11 August 2013
20:30 EEST (UTC+03)

Galatasaray	1–0 (a.e.t.)	Fenerbahçe
Drogba 99'	Report (in Turkish)

Kadir Has Stadium, Kayseri
Attendance: 32,000
Referee: Bülent Yıldırım

Galatasaray	Fenerbahçe

GK	25	(Uruguay) Fernando Muslera	(yellow card) 120'
RB	27	(Ivory Coast) Emmanuel Eboué
CB	5	(Turkey) Gökhan Zan	(yellow card) 49'
CB	26	(Turkey) Semih Kaya
LB	22	(Turkey) Hakan Balta (c)
CM	8	(Turkey) Selçuk İnan
CM	3	(Brazil) Felipe Melo	(yellow card) 80'
RW	4	(Turkey) Hamit Altıntop	(yellow card) 37'	(substituted off) 81'
AM	10	(Netherlands) Wesley Sneijder		(substituted off) 108'
LW	53	(Morocco) Nordin Amrabat	(yellow card) 28'	(substituted off) 81'
CF	11	(Ivory Coast) Didier Drogba	(yellow card) 115'
Substitutes:
GK	67	(Turkey) Eray İşcan
MF	52	(Turkey) Emre Çolak		(substituted on) 108'
MF	6	(Turkey) Ceyhun Gülselam
MF	24	(Turkey) Erman Kılıç		(substituted on) 81'
FW	19	(Turkey) Umut Bulut		(substituted on) 81'
FW	23	(Turkey) Colin Kazim-Richards
FW	17	(Turkey) Burak Yılmaz
Manager:
(Turkey) Fatih Terim Assistant referees: Bahattın Duran; Tarik Ongun; Fourth official: Süleyman Abay

GK	23	(Turkey) Mert Günok
RB	38	(Turkey) Mehmet Topuz	(yellow card) 46'
CB	22	(Portugal) Bruno Alves	(yellow card) 59' (yellow-red card) 64'
CB	4	(Turkey) Bekir Irtegün
LB	3	(Turkey) Hasan Ali Kaldırım
CM	25	(Turkey) Emre Belözoglu (c)		(substituted off) 104'
CM	5	(Turkey) Mehmet Topal
RW	11	(Netherlands) Dirk Kuyt
AM	16	(Brazil) Cristian		(substituted off) 58'
LW	7	(Senegal) Moussa Sow
CF	9	(Cameroon) Pierre Webó	(yellow card) 62'	(substituted off) 81'
Substitutes:
GK	85	(Turkey) Serkan Kırıntılı
DF	24	(Czech Republic) Michal Kadlec		(substituted on) 81'
DF	53	(Turkey) Serdar Kesimal
MF	88	(Turkey) Caner Erkin	(yellow card) 120'	(substituted on) 104'
MF	21	(Turkey) Selçuk Şahin
MF	26	(Turkey) Alper Potuk		(substituted on) 58'
MF	48	(Turkey) Salih Uçan
Manager:
(Turkey) Ersun Yanal

== See also ==
- 2012–13 Süper Lig
- 2012–13 Turkish Cup
