= Sertan =

Sertan is a Turkish given name for males and may refer to:

== Given name ==
- Sertan Eser, Turkish footballer
- Sertan Flex, Social Media Influencer

== See also ==
- Alpha Cancri
- Primidone
