= Ömer Ali Şahiner =

Turkish footballer

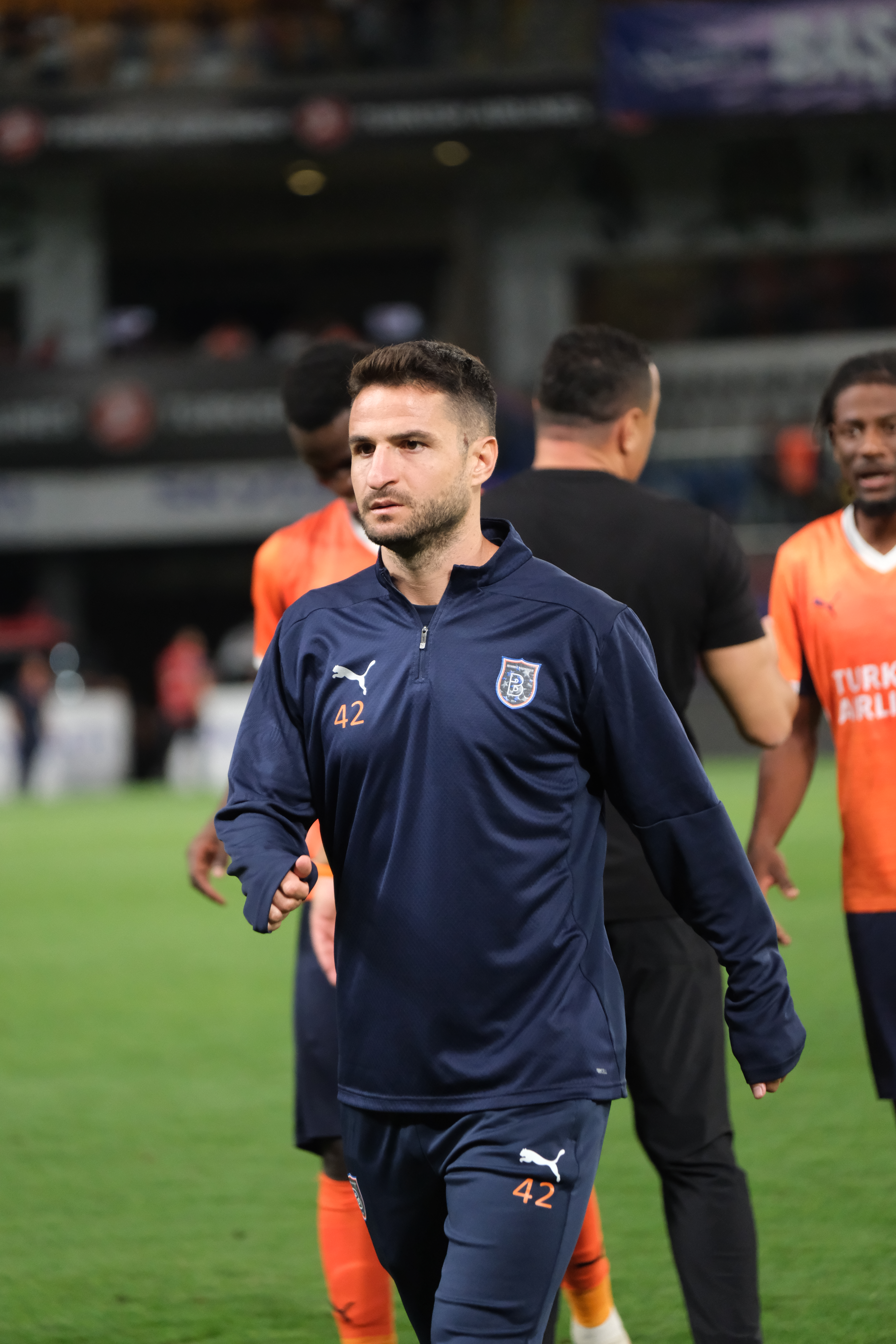

Personal information
- Date of birth: 2 January 1992 (age 34)
- Place of birth: Konya, Turkey
- Height: 1.75 m (5 ft 9 in)
- Positions: Right back; right wing

Team information
- Current team: İstanbul Başakşehir
- Number: 42

Youth career
- 2004–2007: Karabağ GB
- 2007–2008: Konya Şekerspor

Senior career*
Years	Team	Apps	(Gls)
2008–2012	Konya Şekerspor	82	(19)
2012–2021	Konyaspor	240	(31)
2021–	İstanbul Başakşehir	135	(6)

International career^{‡}
2008	Turkey U16	2	(0)
2009	Turkey U17	10	(2)
2009–2010	Turkey U18	11	(5)
2010–2011	Turkey U19	13	(3)
2013–2014	Turkey U21	7	(2)
2015	Turkey B	1	(0)
2019–	Turkey	1	(0)
- * Club domestic league appearances and goals as of 10 June 2026 ‡ National team caps and goals as of 2 June 2019

Ömer Ali Şahiner (born 2 January 1992) is a Turkish footballer who plays as a midfielder for İstanbul Başakşehir. He made his Süper Lig debut on 17 August 2013 against Fenerbahçe.

== Career ==
=== Youth career ===
Şahiner started his debut youth career at Karabağ GB. He moved to Konya Şekerspor in 2007. While he was playing in youth team, first team scouts suggested him to first team.

=== Konya Şekerspor ===
On 26 November 2015, Şahiner made his debut against Mersin İdman Yurdu. Also he became a starter in his first season.

=== Konyaspor ===
In 2012–13 season, Şahiner contracted with Konyaspor for 5 years. He left the club on 26 January 2021.

=== İstanbul Başakşehir ===
Şahiner joined İstanbul Başakşehir on 26 January 2021.

== International ==
He made his Turkey national football team debut on 2 June 2019, in a friendly against Uzbekistan, as a half-time substitute for Efecan Karaca.

== Career statistics ==
As of match played 26 May 2024

Appearances and goals by club, season and competition
Club	Season	League			National cup		Continental		Other		Total	
Club	Season	Division	Apps	Goals	Apps	Goals	Apps	Goals	Apps	Goals	Apps	Goals
Konya Şekerspor	2008–09	2. Lig	10	0	0	0	—		—		10	0
Konya Şekerspor	2009–10	2. Lig	24	3	4	2	—		—		28	5
Konya Şekerspor	2010–11	2. Lig	27	6	4	1	—		1	0	32	7
Konya Şekerspor	2011–12	2. Lig	30	9	2	0	—		—		32	9
Konya Şekerspor	Total		91	18	10	3	—		1	0	102	21
Konyaspor	2012–13	1. Lig	31	2	1	0	—		1	0	33	2
Konyaspor	2013–14	Süper Lig	27	2	1	0	—		—		28	2
Konyaspor	2014–15	Süper Lig	30	2	5	2	—		—		35	4
Konyaspor	2015–16	Süper Lig	33	3	9	0	—		—		42	3
Konyaspor	2016–17	Süper Lig	31	5	8	0	6	0	—		45	5
Konyaspor	2017–18	Süper Lig	31	5	5	1	6	0	1	0	43	6
Konyaspor	2018–19	Süper Lig	27	8	0	0	—		—		27	8
Konyaspor	2019–20	Süper Lig	30	4	1	0	—		—		31	4
Konyaspor	2020–21	Süper Lig	12	0	2	2	—		—		14	2
Konyaspor	Total		252	31	32	5	12	0	2	0	298	36
İstanbul Başakşehir	2020–21	Süper Lig	16	2	1	0	—		1	0	18	2
İstanbul Başakşehir	2021–22	Süper Lig	22	0	0	0	—		—		22	0
İstanbul Başakşehir	2022–23	Süper Lig	27	1	6	0	11	0	—		44	1
İstanbul Başakşehir	2023–24	Süper Lig	22	0	1	0	—		—		23	0
İstanbul Başakşehir	Total		87	3	8	0	11	0	1	0	107	3
Career total			430	52	50	8	23	0	4	0	507	60

== Honours ==
Konyaspor

- Turkish Cup (1): 2016–17
- Turkish Super Cup (1): 2017
