= Moryké Fofana =

Ivorian footballer (born 1991)

Personal information
- Date of birth: 23 November 1991 (age 34)
- Place of birth: Grand-Bassam, Ivory Coast
- Height: 1.78 m (5 ft 10 in)
- Position: Winger

Team information
- Current team: Ankara Keçiörengücü
- Number: 77

Youth career
- 2010–2012: EFYM

Senior career*
| Years | Team | Apps | (Gls) |
| 2012–2015 | Lillestrøm | 71 | (13) |
| 2015–2017 | Lorient B | 10 | (4) |
| 2015–2017 | Lorient | 13 | (0) |
| 2017–2019 | Konyaspor | 76 | (9) |
| 2019–2021 | Yeni Malatyaspor | 60 | (3) |
| 2021–2024 | Samsunspor | 84 | (16) |
| 2024–2025 | Manisa | 32 | (6) |
| 2025–2026 | Iğdır | 34 | (5) |
| 2026– | Ankara Keçiörengücü | 9 | (0) |
- * Club domestic league appearances and goals as of 19 October 2026

Moryké Fofana (born 23 November 1991) is an Ivorian professional footballer who plays as a winger for Turkish TFF 1. Lig club Ankara Keçiörengücü.

== Career ==
Fofana started his career at École de Football Yéo Martial. Ahead of the 2012 season, he signed for Lillestrøm. He made his debut for Lillestrøm in a 1–0 loss to Sogndal on 7 October 2012.

In July 2015, Fofana moved to French Ligue 1 side FC Lorient on a four-year contract.

In January 2017, he signed a 2.5-year contract with Turkish club Konyaspor.

In June 2019, he signed a contract with Turkish club Yeni Malatyaspor. In August 2021, Fofana signed with TFF First League club Samsunspor.

== Career statistics ==
As of match played 11 April 2023

Appearances and goals by club, season and competition
| Club | Season | League | | | Cup (Note: Includes Norwegian Football Cup, Coupe de France, Coupe de la Ligue, Turkish Cup and Turkish Super Cup matches) | | Europe | | Total | |
| Club | Season | Division | Apps | Goals | Apps | Goals | Apps | Goals | Apps | Goals |
|---|---|---|---|---|---|---|---|---|---|---|
| Lillestrøm | 2012 | Tippeligaen | 2 | 0 | 0 | 0 | — | | 2 | 0 |
| Lillestrøm | 2013 | Tippeligaen | 25 | 0 | 6 | 1 | — | | 31 | 1 |
| Lillestrøm | 2014 | Tippeligaen | 29 | 6 | 5 | 2 | — | | 34 | 8 |
| Lillestrøm | 2015 | Tippeligaen | 15 | 7 | 3 | 2 | — | | 18 | 9 |
| Lillestrøm | Total | | 71 | 13 | 14 | 5 | — | | 85 | 18 |
| Lorient | 2015–16 | Ligue 1 | 6 | 0 | 4 | 2 | — | | 10 | 2 |
| Lorient | 2016–17 | Ligue 1 | 7 | 0 | 1 | 0 | — | | 8 | 0 |
| Lorient | Total | | 13 | 0 | 5 | 2 | — | | 18 | 2 |
| Konyaspor | 2016–17 | Süper Lig | 13 | 0 | 7 | 2 | — | | 20 | 2 |
| Konyaspor | 2017–18 | Süper Lig | 31 | 3 | 5 | 1 | 6 (Note: Appearances in UEFA Europa League) | 0 | 42 | 4 |
| Konyaspor | 2018–19 | Süper Lig | 32 | 6 | 2 | 0 | — | | 34 | 6 |
| Konyaspor | Total | | 76 | 9 | 14 | 3 | 6 | 0 | 96 | 12 |
| Yeni Malatyaspor | 2019–20 | Süper Lig | 29 | 1 | 3 | 1 | 4 | 0 | 36 | 2 |
| Yeni Malatyaspor | 2020–21 | Süper Lig | 31 | 2 | 3 | 0 | — | | 34 | 2 |
| Yeni Malatyaspor | Total | | 60 | 3 | 6 | 1 | 4 | 0 | 70 | 4 |
| Samsunspor | 2021–22 | TFF First League | 33 | 10 | 1 | 0 | — | | 34 | 10 |
| Samsunspor | 2022–23 | TFF First League | 21 | 4 | 2 | 0 | — | | 23 | 4 |
| Samsunspor | Total | | 54 | 14 | 3 | 0 | — | | 57 | 14 |
| Career total | | | 274 | 39 | 42 | 11 | 10 | 0 | 326 | 50 |

== Honours ==
Konyaspor

- Turkish Cup: 2016–17
- Turkish Super Cup: 2017
