= Serkan Kırıntılı =

Turkish footballer

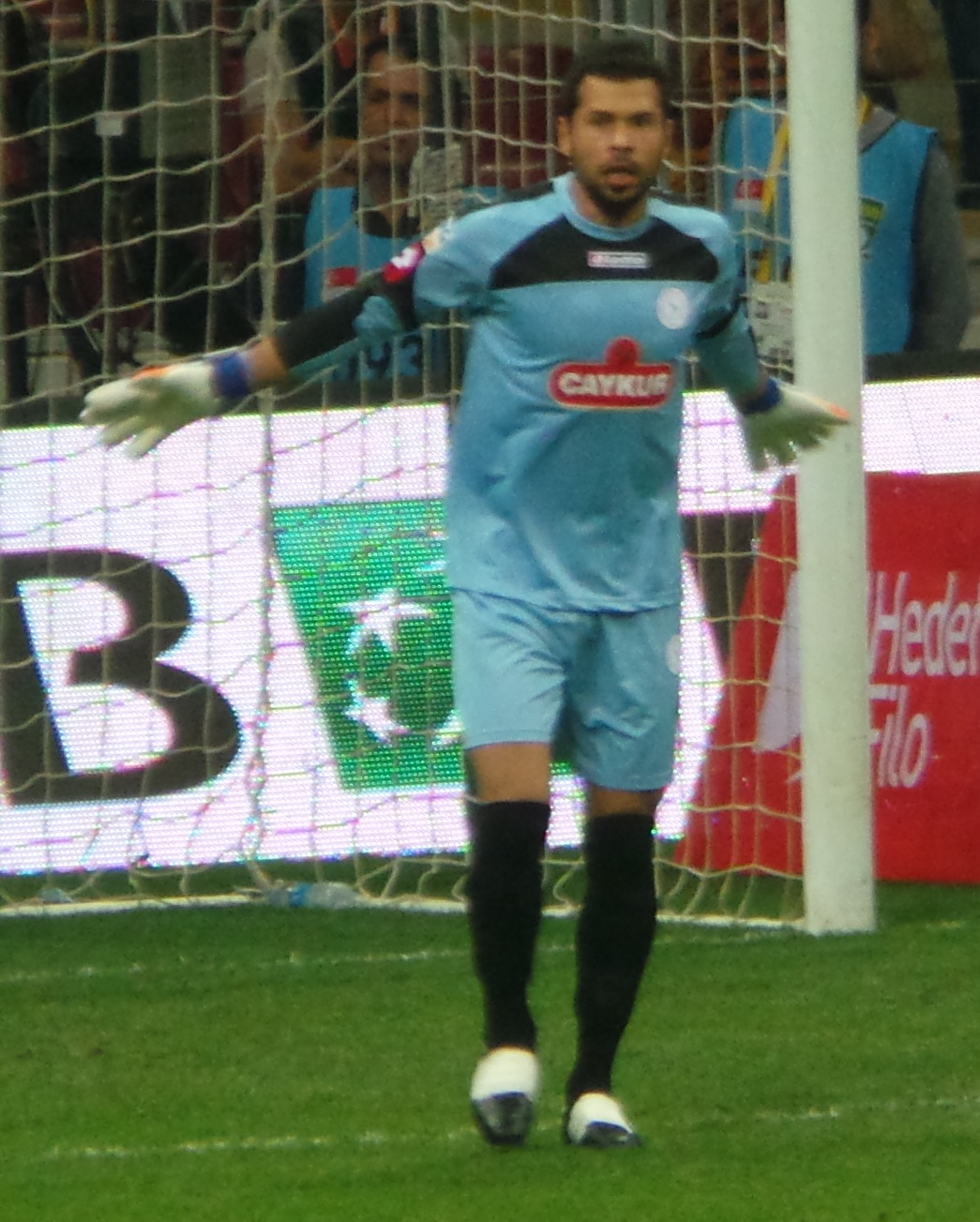
- Serkan Kırıntılı with Çaykur Rizespor in 2013

Personal information
- Date of birth: 15 February 1985 (age 41)
- Place of birth: Adana, Turkey
- Height: 1.85 m (6 ft 1 in)
- Position: Goalkeeper

Youth career
- 1999–2002: Adanaspor

Senior career*
Years	Team	Apps	(Gls)
2002–2004	Adanaspor	11	(0)
2004–2010	MKE Ankaragücü	127	(0)
2010–2013	Fenerbahçe	0	(0)
2013–2015	Çaykur Rizespor	64	(0)
2015–2021	Konyaspor	153	(0)
2021–2022	Alanyaspor	22	(0)
2022–2023	Ümraniyespor	10	(0)

International career^{‡}
2002	Turkey U18	1	(0)
2002–2004	Turkey U19	19	(0)
2003–2005	Turkey U20	9	(0)
2005–2006	Turkey U21	9	(0)
2018	Turkey	4	(0)
- * Club domestic league appearances and goals as of 7 June 2023 ‡ National team caps and goals as of 17 November 2019

Serkan Kırıntılı (born 15 February 1985) is a former Turkish professional footballer who plays as a goalkeeper.

== Club career ==
On 21 October 2019, Kırıntılı received the fastest ever red card given to a player in Turkish football history, having grabbed the ball with his hands outside the box just 13 seconds into the game against Yeni Malatyaspor.

== International career ==
A youth international for Turkey, Kırıntılı was called up to the Turkey national football team in 2018, at the age of 33. He debuted for Turkey in a 2–1 friendly win over Iran on 28 May 2018.

== Honours ==
Fenerbahçe

- Süper Lig: 2010–11
- Turkish Cup: 2011–12, 2012–13

Konyaspor

- Turkish Cup: 2016–17
- Turkish Super Cup: 2017
