= Deni Milošević =

Bosnian footballer (born 1995)

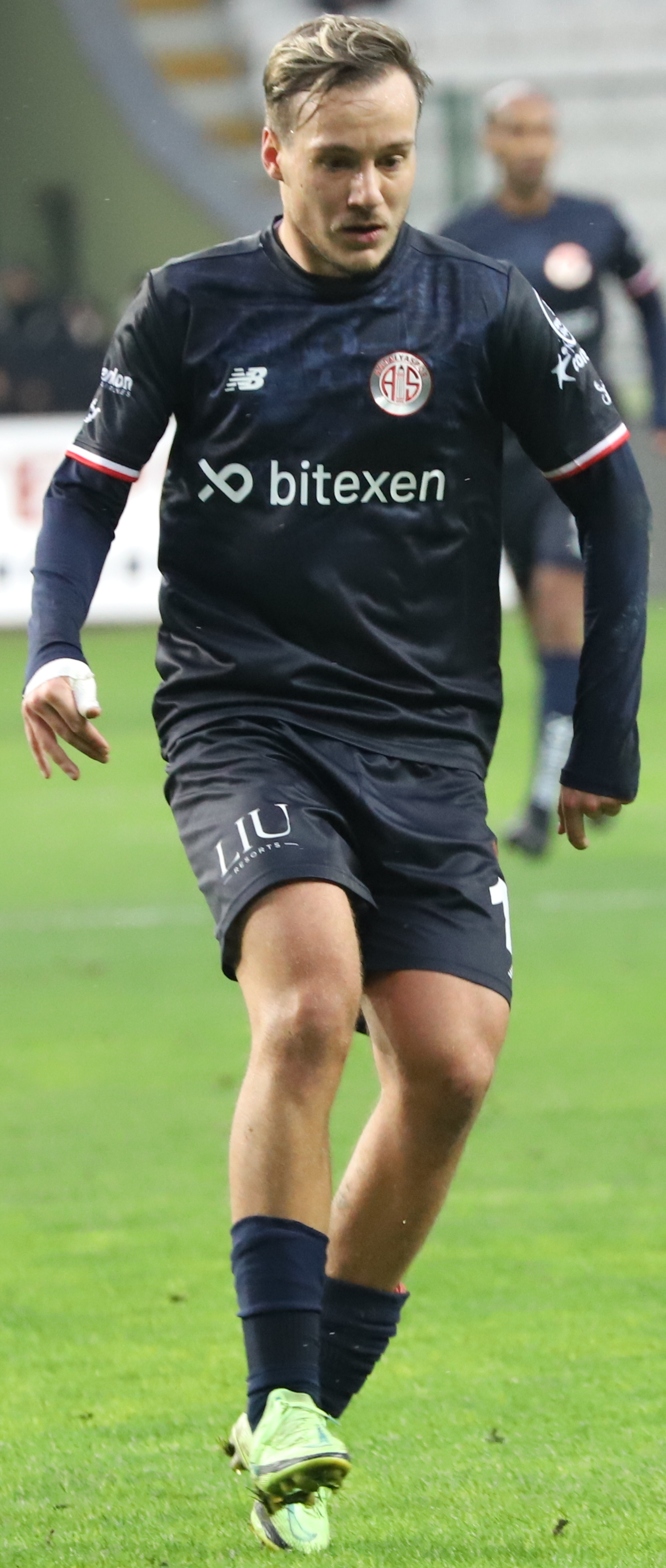
- Milošević playing for Antalyaspor in 2021

Personal information
- Date of birth: 9 March 1995 (age 31)
- Place of birth: Liège, Belgium
- Height: 1.83 m (6 ft 0 in)
- Position: Attacking midfielder

Team information
- Current team: Željezničar
- Number: 27

Youth career
- Standard Liège

Senior career*
Years	Team	Apps	(Gls)
2014–2016	Standard Liège	3	(0)
2015–2016	→ Beveren (loan)	23	(4)
2016–2021	Konyaspor	159	(13)
2021–2025	Antalyaspor	34	(0)
2022–2023	→ Sakaryaspor (loan)	20	(1)
2025–	Željezničar	39	(0)

International career
2010–2011	Belgium U16	11	(2)
2011–2012	Belgium U17	8	(3)
2013	Belgium U18	5	(0)
2015–2016	Bosnia and Herzegovina U21	6	(0)
2018–2020	Bosnia and Herzegovina	11	(1)
- * Club domestic league appearances and goals as of 21 November 2026

Deni Milošević (pronounced [děni milôːʃeʋitɕ]; born 9 March 1995) is a professional footballer who plays as an attacking midfielder for Bosnian Premier League club Željezničar. Born in Belgium, he played for the Bosnia and Herzegovina national team.

Milošević started his professional career at Standard Liège, who loaned him to Beveren in 2015. The following year, he joined Konyaspor. In 2021, he switched to Antalyaspor, who sent him on loan to Sakaryaspor in 2022. Three years later, he moved to Željezničar.

Milošević represented Belgium and Bosnia and Herzegovina at youth levels, but decided to represent the latter at the senior level. He made his senior international debut in 2018, earning 11 caps until 2020.

== Club career ==
=== Standard Liège ===
Milošević came through the youth academy of his hometown club Standard Liège. He made his professional debut in a UEFA Europa League game against Elfsborg on 12 December 2013 at the age of 18. A month later, he made his league debut against Oostende.

In September 2015, he was sent on a season-long loan to Beveren. On 20 September, he scored his first professional goal against Club Brugge.

=== Konyaspor ===
In June 2016, Milošević was transferred to Turkish outfit Konyaspor for an undisclosed fee. He made his official debut for the team against Rizespor on 20 August. On 20 October, he scored his first goal for Konyaspor in a UEFA Europa League tie against Braga. Three months later, he scored his first league goal in a triumph over Rizespor. He won his first title with Konyaspor, the club's first ever trophy, on 31 May 2017, by beating İstanbul Başakşehir in the Turkish Cup final.

Milošević made his 100th appearance for the squad against Kahramanmaraşspor on 31 October 2018.

In January 2019, he extended his contract with the team until June 2022.

=== Antalyaspor ===
In July 2021, Milošević moved to Antalyaspor on a three-year deal. He made his competitive debut for the side on 15 August against Göztepe. On 28 October, he scored his first goal for Antalyaspor in a Turkish Cup fixture against Diyarbakırspor.

In September 2022, he was loaned to Sakaryaspor until the end of the season.

=== Željezničar ===
On 3 September 2025, Milošević signed a two-year contract with Bosnian Premier League side Željezničar. He debuted in a 3–2 home win over Borac Banja Luka on 15 September.

== International career ==
Despite representing Belgium at various youth levels, Milošević decided to play for Bosnia and Herzegovina at the senior level. He was first part of the Bosnia and Herzegovina under-21 team.

In August 2015, his request to change sports citizenship from Belgian to Bosnian was approved by FIFA. Subsequently, he received his first senior call up in August 2017, for 2018 FIFA World Cup qualifiers against Cyprus and Gibraltar, but had to wait until 23 March 2018 to make his debut in a friendly game against Bulgaria.

On 23 March 2019, in a UEFA Euro 2020 qualifier against Armenia, Milošević scored his first senior international goal.

== Personal life ==
Milošević's father Cvijan was also a professional footballer.

== Career statistics ==
=== Club ===
As of match played 21 November 2026

Appearances and goals by club, season and competition
Club	Season	League			National cup (Note: Includes Belgian Cup, Turkish Cup)		Continental		Other		Total	
Club	Season	Division	Apps	Goals	Apps	Goals	Apps	Goals	Apps	Goals	Apps	Goals
Standard Liège	2013–14	Belgian Pro League	1	0	0	0	1 (Note: Appearance(s) in UEFA Europa League)	0	–		2	0
Standard Liège	2014–15	Belgian Pro League	2	0	0	0	1	0	–		3	0
Standard Liège	Total		3	0	0	0	2	0	–		5	0
Beveren (loan)	2015–16	Belgian Pro League	23	4	1	0	–		–		24	4
Konyaspor	2016–17	Süper Lig	31	2	10	0	6	1	–		47	3
Konyaspor	2017–18	Süper Lig	33	3	2	0	6	1	1 (Note: Appearance in Turkish Super Cup)	0	42	4
Konyaspor	2018–19	Süper Lig	33	1	2	1	–		–		35	2
Konyaspor	2019–20	Süper Lig	32	5	0	0	–		–		32	5
Konyaspor	2020–21	Süper Lig	30	2	4	1	–		–		34	3
Konyaspor	Total		159	13	18	2	12	2	1	0	190	17
Antalyaspor	2021–22	Süper Lig	15	0	3	1	–		1	0	19	1
Antalyaspor	2023–24	Süper Lig	14	0	3	0	–		–		17	0
Antalyaspor	2024–25	Süper Lig	5	0	4	1	–		–		9	1
Antalyaspor	Total		34	0	10	2	–		1	0	45	2
Sakaryaspor (loan)	2022–23	1. Lig	20	1	0	0	–		1 (Note: Appearance in 1. Lig promotion play-offs)	0	21	1
Željezničar	2025–26	Bosnian Premier League	29	0	4	0	–		–		33	0
Željezničar	2026–27	Bosnian Premier League	10	0	1	0	–		–		11	0
Željezničar	Total		39	0	5	0	–		–		44	0
Career total			278	18	34	4	14	2	3	0	329	24

=== International ===
Appearances and goals by national team and year
National team	Year	Apps	Goals
Bosnia and Herzegovina
Bosnia and Herzegovina	2018	4	0
Bosnia and Herzegovina	2019	3	1
Bosnia and Herzegovina	2020	4	0
Total		11	1

Scores and results list Bosnia and Herzegovina's goal tally first, score column indicates score after each Milošević goal.

List of international goals scored by Deni Milošević
No.	Date	Venue	Cap	Opponent	Score	Result	Competition
1	23 March 2019	Grbavica, Sarajevo, Bosnia and Herzegovina	5	Armenia	2–0	2–1	UEFA Euro 2020 qualifying

== Honours ==
Konyaspor

- Turkish Cup: 2016–17
- Turkish Super Cup: 2017
