= Serhat Ardahanspor =

Turkish football club

- Full name: Serhat Ardahan Spor Kulübü
- Nickname: Boğalar (The Bulls)
- Founded: 01 January 2013; 13 years ago
- Ground: Ardahan 80.Yıl Cumhuriyet Şehir Stadyumu
- Capacity: 3,000
- Chairman: Üzeyir Engin
- Manager: Mustafa Engin Özmen
- League: Turkish Regional Amateur League

Serhat Ardahan Spor Klübü (commonly known as Serhat Ardahanspor) is a Turkish football club, located in Ardahan Province and founded in 2013. The club is nicknamed The Bulls (Turkish:Boğalar).

== History ==
The club was promoted to the Turkish Regional Amateur League in 2014 as champion of the Ardahan Amateur Football League. The club played in the first round of the 2014–15 Turkish Cup and reached the second round of the 2016–17 Turkish Cup.
