= Nejc Skubic =

Slovenian footballer

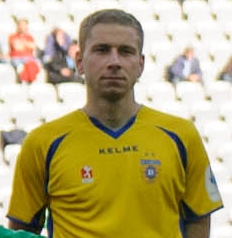
- Skubic with Domžale in 2012

Personal information
- Date of birth: 13 June 1989 (age 37)
- Place of birth: Kranj, SFR Yugoslavia
- Height: 1.77 m (5 ft 10 in)
- Position: Right-back

Youth career
- Olimpija
- Interblock

Senior career*
| Years | Team | Apps | (Gls) |
| 2007–2011 | Interblock | 41 | (3) |
| 2008–2009 | → Livar (loan) | 16 | (1) |
| 2010 | → Drava Ptuj (loan) | 12 | (0) |
| 2011 | Oțelul Galați | 2 | (0) |
| 2012–2015 | Domžale | 119 | (2) |
| 2016–2022 | Konyaspor | 216 | (17) |
| Total | | 406 | (23) |

International career
| 2008–2009 | Slovenia U20 | 2 | (0) |
| 2009 | Slovenia U21 | 4 | (0) |
| 2016–2021 | Slovenia | 23 | (1) |
- * Club domestic league appearances and goals

Nejc Skubic (born 13 June 1989) is a retired Slovenian footballer who played as a right-back.

== Club career ==
Skubic signed a six-month contract with Romanian side Oțelul Galați in July 2011 and made his debut during a Cupa României match on 20 September 2011. He returned to Domžale in January 2012, signing a two-and-a-half-year contract.

== International career ==
Skubic received his first call-up to the senior Slovenia squad for the UEFA Euro 2016 qualifier against San Marino in October 2015. However, he was an unused substitute, and made his debut on 23 March 2016 against Macedonia instead. Overall, he earned a total of 23 caps, scoring 1 goal.

== Career statistics ==
=== International ===
Scores and results list Slovenia's goal tally first, score column indicates score after each Skubic goal.

List of international goals scored by Nejc Skubic
| No. | Date | Venue | Opponent | Score | Result | Competition |
|---|---|---|---|---|---|---|
| 1 | 16 October 2018 | Stožice Stadium, Ljubljana, Slovenia | Cyprus | 1–1 | 1–1 | 2018–19 UEFA Nations League C |

== Honours ==
Interblock

- Slovenian Cup: 2007–08, 2008–09

Konyaspor

- Turkish Cup: 2016–17
- Turkish Super Cup: 2017
