= Tayfun Türkmen =

Turkish footballer

Personal information
- Date of birth: 12 April 1978 (age 48)
- Place of birth: Anamur, Turkey
- Height: 1.87 m (6 ft 2 in)
- Positions: Centre forward; defender

Senior career*
Years	Team	Apps	(Gls)
1998–1999	Y. Anamurspor	29	(20)
1999–2001	Ankaragücü	30	(0)
1999–2000	→ Asaşspor (loan)	45	(16)
2001–2003	Kayseri Erciyesspor	28	(12)
2003–2007	Konyaspor	120	(21)
2007–2008	Ankaraspor	27	(1)
2008–2009	Eskişehirspor	29	(1)
2009–2010	Konyaspor	28	(5)
2010–2011	Bak Spor Kulübü	12	(2)
- * Club domestic league appearances and goals

Tayfun Türkmen (born 12 April 1978) is a Turkish former football player.

Although he could also play as a central defender, Tayfun was renowned primarily as a centre forward.
