= Amir Hadžiahmetović =

Bosnian footballer (born 1997)

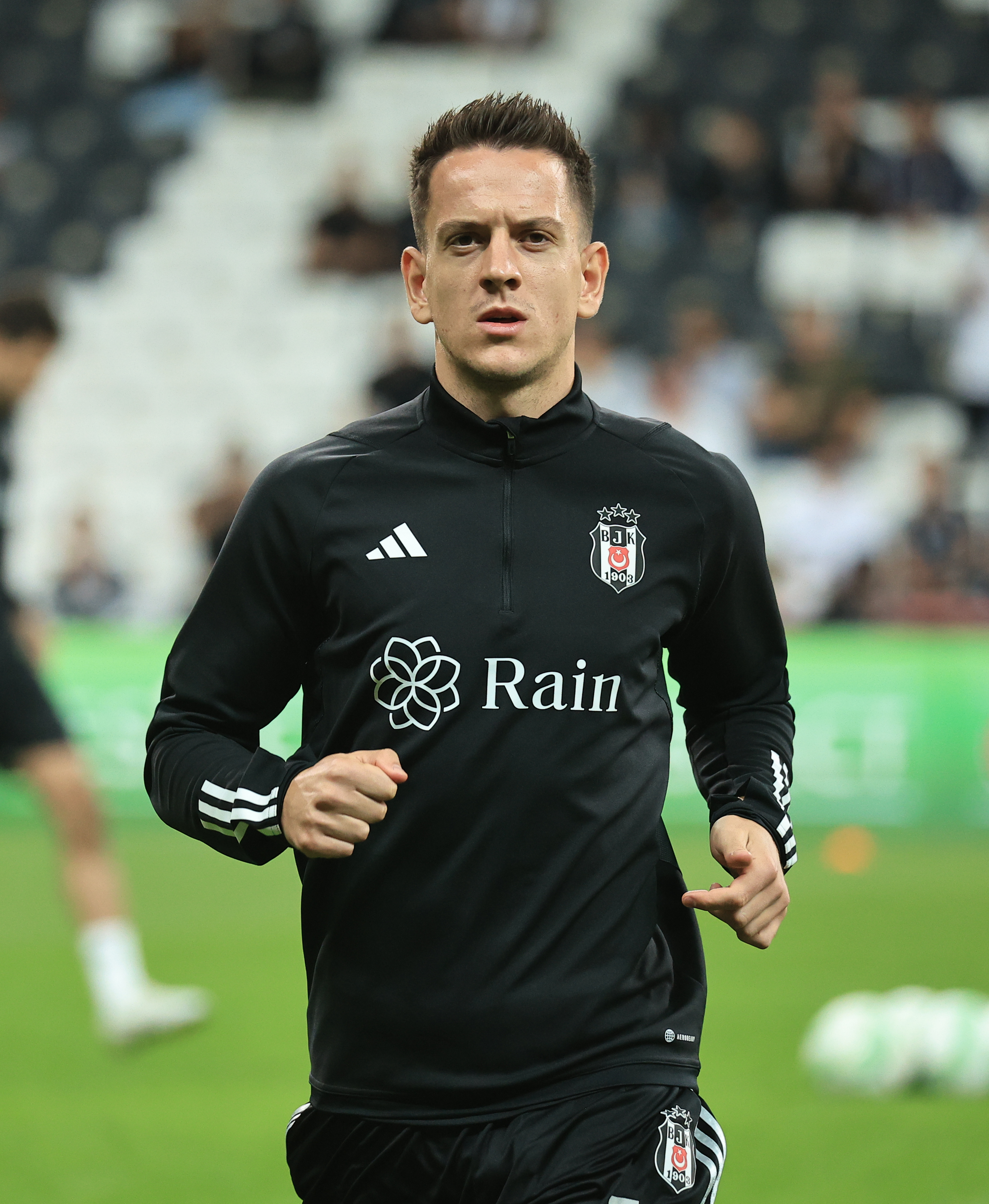
- Hadžiahmetović with Beşiktaş in 2023

Personal information
- Date of birth: 8 March 1997 (age 29)
- Place of birth: Nexø, Denmark
- Height: 1.79 m (5 ft 10 in)
- Position: Defensive midfielder

Team information
- Current team: Ludogorets Razgrad
- Number: 8

Youth career
- 2003–2009: Nexø Boldklub
- 2009–2014: Željezničar

Senior career*
Years	Team	Apps	(Gls)
2014–2016	Željezničar	36	(3)
2016–2023	Konyaspor	169	(12)
2023–2026	Beşiktaş	41	(1)
2024–2025	→ Rizespor (loan)	21	(1)
2025–2026	→ Hull City (loan)	37	(0)
2026–	Ludogorets Razgrad	3	(0)

International career^{‡}
2013–2014	Bosnia and Herzegovina U17	10	(0)
2014–2015	Bosnia and Herzegovina U19	7	(1)
2015–2018	Bosnia and Herzegovina U21	13	(1)
2020–	Bosnia and Herzegovina	37	(0)
- * Club domestic league appearances and goals as of 7 November 2026 ‡ National team caps and goals as of 18 June 2026

Amir Hadžiahmetović (pronounced [âːmir xadʒiaxmêːtoʋitɕ]; born 8 March 1997) is a professional footballer who plays as a defensive midfielder for Bulgarian First League club Ludogorets. Born in Denmark, he plays for the Bosnia and Herzegovina national team.

Hadžiahmetović started his professional career at Željezničar, before joining Konyaspor in 2016. Seven years later, he was transferred to Beşiktaş, who loaned him to Rizespor in 2024 and to Hull City in 2025. The following year, he signed with Ludogorets.

A former youth international for Bosnia and Herzegovina, Hadžiahmetović made his senior international debut in 2020, earning over 30 caps since. He represented the nation at the 2026 FIFA World Cup.

== Club career ==
=== Željezničar ===
Hadžiahmetović started playing football at his hometown club Nexø Boldklub, before joining the youth academy of Željezničar in 2009. In July 2014, he signed his first professional contract with the team. He made his professional debut against Olimpic on 2 August at the age of 17. On 13 May 2015, he scored his first professional goal in a triumph over Mladost Velika Obarska.

=== Konyaspor ===
In February 2016, Hadžiahmetović was transferred to Turkish outfit Konyaspor for an undisclosed fee. He made his official debut for the side in a Turkish Cup game against Beşiktaş on 10 February. Seven weeks later, he made his league debut against Gençlerbirliği. On 19 November, he scored his first goal for the team in a defeat of Gaziantepspor. He won his first title with Konyaspor, club's first trophy ever, on 31 May 2017, by beating İstanbul Başakşehir in the Turkish Cup final.

Hadžiahmetović played his 100th match for the squad against Sivasspor on 21 June 2020.

In July 2021, he extended his deal with Konyaspor until June 2024.

=== Beşiktaş ===
In February 2023, Hadžiahmetović moved to Beşiktaş on a contract until June 2027. He made his competitive debut for the team on 4 February against Sivasspor. On 30 April, he scored his first goal for Beşiktaş in a victory over Galatasaray.

In January 2024, Hadžiahmetović suffered a severe knee injury, which was diagnosed as an anterior cruciate ligament tear and was ruled out for at least six months. Over seven months after the injury, on 12 August, he returned to the pitch.

He won his first piece of silverware with the club on 23 May, when they beat Trabzonspor in the Turkish Cup final.

In August, he was sent on a season-long loan to Rizespor, but was recalled in February 2025.

In September, he was loaned to English side Hull City until the end of the season.

=== Ludogorets ===
In September 2026, Hadžiahmetović signed a three-year deal with Bulgarian team Ludogorets. He debuted officially for the squad against Arda on 12 October.

== International career ==
Hadžiahmetović represented Bosnia and Herzegovina at all youth levels.

In August 2020, he received his first senior call up, for 2020–21 UEFA Nations League A games against Italy and Poland. He debuted against the former on 4 September.

In June 2026, Hadžiahmetović was named in Bosnia and Herzegovina's squad for the 2026 FIFA World Cup. He made his tournament debut in the second group match against Switzerland on 18 June.

== Career statistics ==
=== Club ===
As of match played 7 November 2026

Appearances and goals by club, season and competition
Club	Season	League			National cup (Note: Includes Bosnian Cup, Turkish Cup, FA Cup, Bulgarian Cup)		Continental		Total	
Club	Season	Division	Apps	Goals	Apps	Goals	Apps	Goals	Apps	Goals
Željezničar	2014–15	Bosnian Premier League	21	1	3	0	0	0	24	1
Željezničar	2015–16	Bosnian Premier League	15	2	2	0	6 (Note: Appearances in UEFA Europa League)	0	23	2
Željezničar	Total		36	3	5	0	6	0	47	3
Konyaspor	2015–16	Süper Lig	5	0	3	0	–		8	0
Konyaspor	2016–17	Süper Lig	30	1	8	1	6	0	44	2
Konyaspor	2017–18	Süper Lig	9	1	3	0	0	0	12	1
Konyaspor	2018–19	Süper Lig	14	0	2	1	–		16	1
Konyaspor	2019–20	Süper Lig	23	1	1	0	–		24	1
Konyaspor	2020–21	Süper Lig	34	4	1	0	–		35	4
Konyaspor	2021–22	Süper Lig	36	2	1	0	–		37	2
Konyaspor	2022–23	Süper Lig	18	3	1	2	4 (Note: Appearances in UEFA Conference League)	1	23	6
Konyaspor	Total		169	12	20	4	10	1	199	17
Beşiktaş	2022–23	Süper Lig	12	1	–		–		12	1
Beşiktaş	2023–24	Süper Lig	18	0	0	0	12	0	30	0
Beşiktaş	2024–25	Süper Lig	11	0	2	0	–		13	0
Beşiktaş	2025–26	Süper Lig	0	0	0	0	2 (Note: One appearance in UEFA Europa League; one appearance in UEFA Conference League)	0	2	0
Beşiktaş	2026–27	Süper Lig	0	0	0	0	3	0	3	0
Beşiktaş	Total		41	1	2	0	17	0	60	1
Rizespor (loan)	2024–25	Süper Lig	21	1	2	0	–		23	1
Hull City (loan)	2025–26	Championship	37	0	2	0	–		39	0
Ludogorets	2026–27	Bulgarian First League	3	0	1	0	–		4	0
Career total			307	17	32	4	32	1	371	22

=== International ===
As of match played 18 June 2026

Appearances and goals by national team and year
National team	Year	Apps	Goals
Bosnia and Herzegovina
Bosnia and Herzegovina	2020	5	0
Bosnia and Herzegovina	2021	10	0
Bosnia and Herzegovina	2022	6	0
Bosnia and Herzegovina	2023	9	0
Bosnia and Herzegovina	2024	0	0
Bosnia and Herzegovina	2025	2	0
Bosnia and Herzegovina	2026	5	0
Total		37	0

== Honours ==
Konyaspor

- Turkish Cup: 2016–17
- Turkish Super Cup: 2017

Beşiktaş

- Turkish Cup: 2023–24
- Turkish Super Cup: 2024
