= 2013 Turkish Cup final =

- Event: 2012–13 Turkish Cup
Fenerbahçe	Trabzonspor
1	0
- Date: 22 May 2013
- Venue: Ankara 19 Mayıs Stadium, Ankara
- Man of the Match: (Senegal) Moussa Sow
- Referee: (Turkey) Fırat Aydınus
- Attendance: 19,500
- Weather: 14 °C (Clear)

The 2013 Turkish Cup final (Turkish: Türkiye Kupası Finali) was the 51st final of the Turkish Cup. The final was contested between Fenerbahçe and Trabzonspor. Match was played on 22 May 2013, at 20:45 local time. The venue chosen for the match was Ankara 19 Mayıs Stadium, a neutral ground for both clubs. Fenerbahçe were the winners of the match, and eventual winners of the 2012–13 Turkish Cup.

== Final ==
22 May 2013
20:45 EEST (UTC+03)
Final

Fenerbahçe	1 – 0	Trabzonspor
Moussa Sow 9'	Report

Ankara 19 Mayıs Stadium
Attendance: 19,500
Referee: Fırat Aydınus

Fenerbahçe	Trabzonspor

FENERBAHÇE:
GK	34	(Turkey) Mert Günok	(yellow card) 90+2'
DF	2	(Turkey) Egemen Korkmaz		(substituted off) 51'
DF	3	(Turkey) Hasan Ali Kaldırım
DF	6	(Nigeria) Joseph Yobo
DF	77	(Turkey) Gökhan Gönül
MF	5	(Turkey) Mehmet Topal
MF	16	(Brazil) Cristian Baroni		(substituted off) 85'
MF	25	(Turkey) Emre Belözoğlu (C)		(substituted off) 76'	(yellow card) 44'
MF	7	(Senegal) Moussa Sow	9'
MF	11	(Netherlands) Dirk Kuyt	(yellow card) 70'
FW	99	(Cameroon) Pierre Webó	(yellow card) 90+3'
Substitutes:
GK	85	(Turkey) Serkan Kırıntılı
DF	4	(Turkey) Bekir İrtegün		(substituted on) 51'
MF	9	(Slovakia) Miroslav Stoch
MF	38	(Turkey) Mehmet Topuz		(substituted on) 76'
MF	88	(Turkey) Caner Erkin		(substituted on) 85'	(yellow card) MS'
FW	23	(Turkey) Semih Şentürk
FW	28	(Turkey) Beykan Şimşek
Manager:
(Turkey) Aykut Kocaman

Trabzonspor:
GK	29	(Turkey) Tolga Zengin (C)	(yellow card) 90+3'
DF	5	(Slovakia) Marek Čech
DF	22	(Turkey) Mustafa Yumlu
DF	23	(Turkey) Giray Kaçar
DF	30	(Turkey) Serkan Balcı
MF	10	(Poland) Adrian Mierzejewski
FW	14	(Turkey) Soner Aydoğdu		(substituted off) 84'
MF	15	(Ivory Coast) Didier Zokora		(substituted off) 46'	(yellow card) 14'
MF	40	(Turkey) Volkan Şen		(substituted off) 68'
MF	92	(Turkey) Olcan Adın
FW	21	(Turkey) Halil Altıntop
Substitutes:
GK	1	(Turkey) Onur Kıvrak
DF	28	(Czech Republic) Ondřej Čelůstka
DF	11	(Turkey) Yasin Öztekin
MF	18	(Turkey) Aykut Akgün		(substituted on) 46'	(yellow card) 90+3'
MF	27	(Slovakia) Marek Sapara		(substituted on) 84'
MF	91	(Turkey) Zeki Yavru
FW	12	(Brazil) Paulo Henrique		(substituted on) 68'
Manager:
(Turkey) Tolunay Kafkas

Assistant referees:
Serkan Ok
Aleks Taşçıoğlu
Fourth official:
Tolga Özkalfa

Match rules

- 90 minutes
- 30 minutes of extra time if necessary
- Penalty shoot-out if scores still level
- Seven named substitutes
- Maximum of three substitutions

Turkish Cup
2012–13 Winners
Fenerbahçe
6th Title

== See also ==
- 2012–13 Turkish Cup
- 2013 Turkish Super Cup
