= Mustafa Reşit Akçay =

Turkish professional football manager (born 1958)

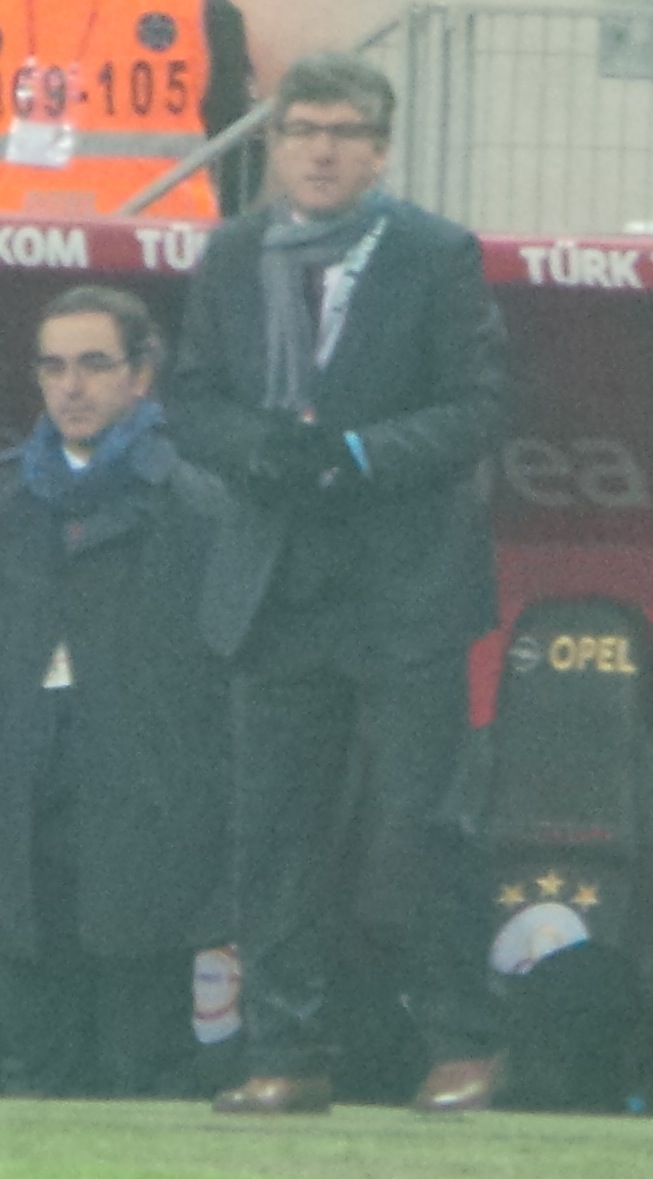
- Akçay as Trabzonspor manager in 2013

Personal information
- Date of birth: 12 December 1958 (age 67)
- Place of birth: Trabzon, Turkey
- Height: 1.67 m (5 ft 5 1/2 in)

Team information
- Current team: Karşıyaka S.K. (manager)

Managerial career
- Years: Team
- 2001: Bulancakspor
- 2003–2004: Gümüşhanespor
- 2004–2005: Pazarspor
- 2006–2007: Arsinspor
- 2007–2008: Ofspor
- 2008: Beylerbeyi
- 2009: Pazarspor
- 2009–2011: Tavşanlı Linyitspor
- 2011–2013: 1461 Trabzon
- 2013–2014: Trabzonspor
- 2014: Akhisarspor
- 2015–2017: Osmanlıspor
- 2017: Konyaspor
- 2018: Osmanlıspor
- 2020: Ankaragücü
- 2021–2022: Kocaelispor
- 2022–2024: Esenler Erokspor
- 2024–: Karşıyaka S.K.

Mustafa Reşit Akçay (born 12 December 1958) is a Turkish professional football manager who is the manager of TFF Second League club Esenler Erokspor.

== Managerial statistics ==
As of 19 June 2020

Team	From	To	Record				
Team	From	To	G	W	D	L	Win %
Arsinspor	28 August 2006	27 April 2007	30	15	5	10	50.00
Ofspor	14 September 2007	31 May 2008	20	14	1	5	70.00
Beylerbeyi	20 August 2008	28 November 2008	14	4	3	7	28.57
Pazarspor	19 March 2009	31 May 2009	8	5	2	1	62.50
Tavşanlı Linyitspor	30 October 2009	31 May 2011	63	31	18	14	49.21
1461 Trabzon	7 July 2011	6 June 2013	75	35	22	18	46.67
Trabzonspor	25 June 2013	10 February 2014	33	17	8	8	51.52
Akhisarspor	1 July 2014	31 December 2014	19	6	7	6	31.58
Osmanlıspor	12 August 2015	21 March 2017	84	35	24	25	41.67
Konyaspor	6 June 2017	24 October 2017	13	4	1	8	30.77
Osmanlıspor	9 August 2018	7 November 2018	13	5	1	7	38.46
Ankaragücü	27 January 2020	23 June 2020	9	3	2	4	33.33
Total			382	174	95	113	45.55

== Honours ==
=== Manager ===
1461 Trabzon

- TFF Second League: 2011–12 (Red Group)

Konyaspor

- Turkish Super Cup: 2017
