= Erman Kılıç =

Turkish footballer

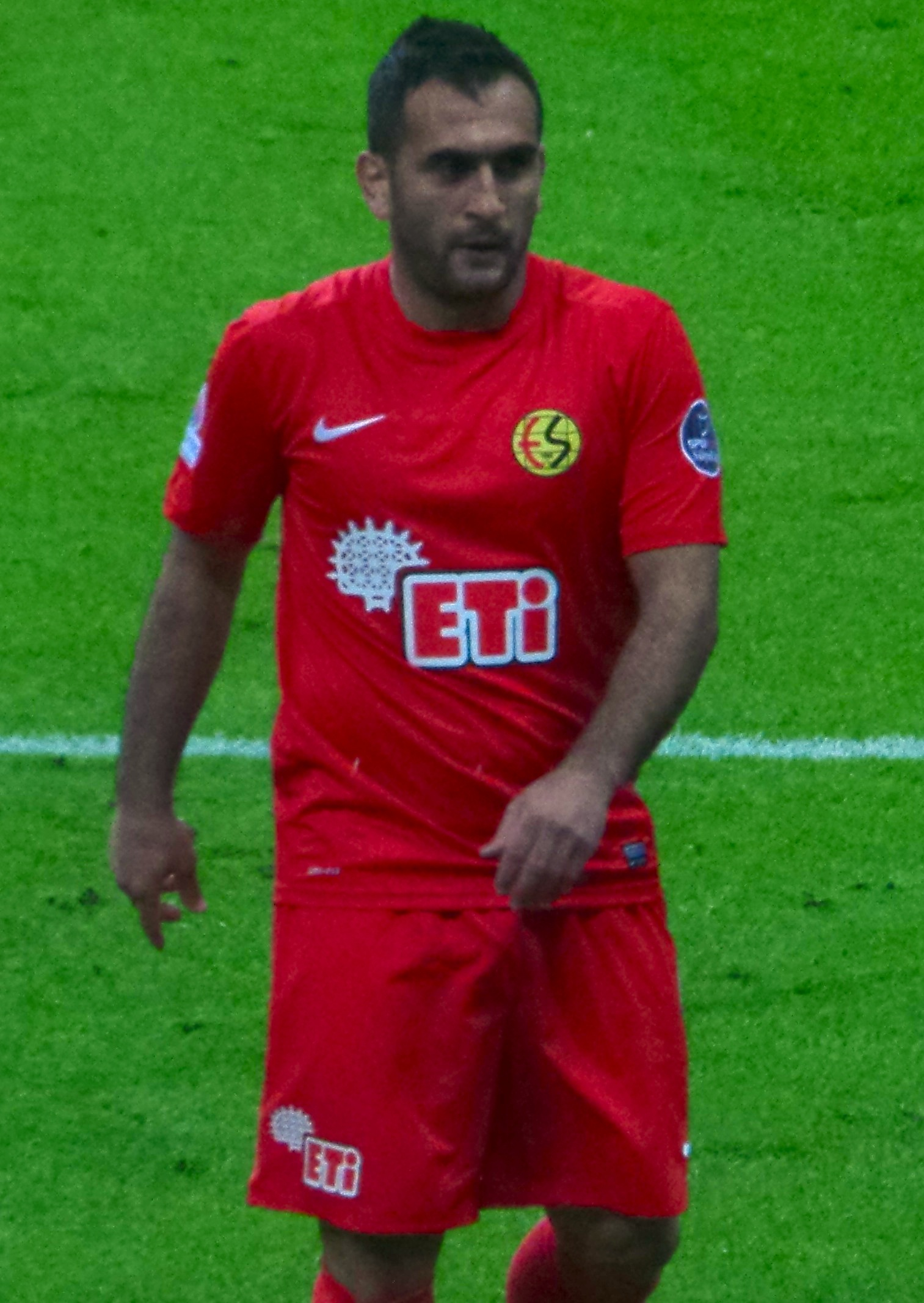

Personal information
- Date of birth: 20 September 1983 (age 43)
- Place of birth: Erzincan, Turkey
- Height: 1.66 m (5 ft 5 1/2 in)
- Positions: Attacking midfielder; winger

Youth career
- 1997–2000: Bergama Belediyespor

Senior career*
| Years | Team | Apps | (Gls) |
| 2000–2003 | Bergama Belediyespor | 25 | (12) |
| 2003–2005 | Göztepe | 55 | (15) |
| 2005–2007 | Elazığspor | 60 | (19) |
| 2007–2009 | İstanbul BB | 67 | (7) |
| 2009–2013 | Sivasspor | 129 | (24) |
| 2013 | Galatasaray | 2 | (0) |
| 2013–2015 | Eskişehirspor | 29 | (1) |
| 2015–2016 | Antalyaspor | 20 | (2) |
| 2016–2017 | Menemen Belediyespor | 29 | (6) |
| 2017–2018 | 24 Erzincanspor | 32 | (5) |
| 2018 | Serik Belediyespor | 11 | (1) |
| 2018–2019 | Kemerspor 2003 | 13 | (1) |
| 2019–2020 | 24 Erzincanspor | 7 | (0) |

Managerial career
- 2020–2021: 24 Erzincanspor (sporting director)
- 2021: 24 Erzincanspor
- 2020–2021: Kuşadasıspor
- 2024: Hatayspor (assistant)
- * Club domestic league appearances and goals

Erman Kılıç (born 20 September 1983) is a Turkish former professional footballer who played as an attacking midfielder and winger.

Kılıç began his career with Bergama Belediyespor in 1999. He spent two years with the club before moving to Göztepe in 2001. After two years with the club, he moved to Elazığspor. In 2007, he was transferred to İstanbul Büyükşehir Belediyespor. Sivasspor transferred him in 2009.

== Coaching career ==
After hanging up his boots in February 2020, Kılıç was hired as sporting director at 24 Erzincanspor, the club he had last played for as an active player, in August 2020. In March 2021, Kılıç became the new manager of the club. In early November 2021, he left the club.

On December 1, 2022, he became the new manager of Kuşadasıspor. He was there for just two months before being fired in early February 2022.

In May 2024, Kılıç became assistant coach at Hatayspor under manager Özhan Pulat.

=== Club career ===
As of 8 November 2014.

| Club | Season | League | | Cup | | Other | | Europe | | Total | |
| Club | Season | Apps | Goals | Apps | Goals | Apps | Goals | Apps | Goals | Apps | Goals |
|---|---|---|---|---|---|---|---|---|---|---|---|
| İstanbul B.B. | 2007–08 | 33 | 1 | 0 | 0 | 0 | 0 | – | | 33 | 1 |
| İstanbul B.B. | 2008–09 | 34 | 6 | 1 | 0 | 0 | 0 | – | | 35 | 6 |
| İstanbul B.B. | Total | 67 | 7 | 1 | 0 | 0 | 0 | – | | 68 | 7 |
| Sivasspor | 2009–10 | 28 | 3 | 4 | 1 | 0 | 0 | 3 | 0 | 35 | 4 |
| Sivasspor | 2010–11 | 29 | 7 | 1 | 0 | – | | – | | 30 | 7 |
| Sivasspor | 2011–12 | 39 | 9 | 3 | 1 | – | | 0 | 0 | 42 | 10 |
| Sivasspor | 2012–13 | 33 | 5 | 11 | 4 | 0 | 0 | 0 | 0 | 41 | 9 |
| Sivasspor | Total | 129 | 24 | 19 | 6 | 0 | 0 | 3 | 0 | 148 | 30 |
| Galatasaray | 2013–14 | 2 | 0 | 0 | 0 | 1 | 0 | 0 | 0 | 3 | 0 |
| Galatasaray | Total | 2 | 0 | 0 | 0 | 1 | 0 | 0 | 0 | 3 | 0 |
| Eskişehirspor | 2013–14 | 28 | 1 | 8 | 0 | 0 | 0 | 0 | 0 | 36 | 1 |
| Eskişehirspor | 2013–14 | 1 | 0 | 2 | 2 | 0 | 0 | 0 | 0 | 3 | 0 |
| Eskişehirspor | Total | 29 | 1 | 10 | 2 | 0 | 0 | 0 | 0 | 39 | 3 |
| Career Totals | | 227 | 32 | 30 | 8 | 1 | 0 | 3 | 0 | 258 | 40 |

== Honours ==
Galatasaray

- Turkish Super Cup: 2013
