= 2017 Turkish Super Cup =

- Event: Turkish Super Cup
Beşiktaş	Konyaspor
1	2
- Date: 6 August 2017
- Venue: Samsun Stadium, Samsun
- Referee: Fırat Aydınus

The 2017 Turkish Super Cup (Turkish: TFF Süper Kupa) was the 44th edition of the Turkish Super Cup since its establishment as Presidential Cup in 1966, the annual Turkish football season-opening match contested by the winners of the previous season's top league and cup competitions (or cup runner-up in case the league- and cup-winning club is the same). It was played on 6 August 2017 between the champions of 2016–17 Süper Lig, Beşiktaş, and the winners of 2016–17 Turkish Cup, Konyaspor.

Konyaspor won the match 2-1 to win their first title in the cup.

== Match ==
=== Details ===
6 August 2017
20:45 TRT

Beşiktaş	1–2	Konyaspor
Tosun 77'		Traoré 33'; Skubic 90+1' (pen.)

Samsun Stadium, Samsun
Referee: Fırat Aydınus

Beşiktaş	Konyaspor

GK	1	(Spain) Fabri
RB	32	(Germany) Andreas Beck		(substituted off) 61'
CB	5	(Portugal) Pepe
CB	6	(Serbia) Duško Tošić
LB	3	(Brazil) Adriano	(yellow card) 90+4'
DM	13	(Canada) Atiba Hutchinson
RM	7	(Portugal) Ricardo Quaresma
CM	18	(Turkey) Tolgay Arslan		(substituted off) 61'
AM	10	(Turkey) Oğuzhan Özyakup (c)
LM	8	(Netherlands) Ryan Babel
CF	23	(Turkey) Cenk Tosun
Substitutes:
GK	29	(Turkey) Tolga Zengin
DF	88	(Turkey) Caner Erkin		(substituted on) 61'
DF	2	(Croatia) Matej Mitrović
MF	15	(Turkey) Orkan Çınar
MF	20	(Turkey) Necip Uysal
FW	9	(Spain) Álvaro Negredo		(substituted on) 61'
FW	11	(Turkey) Mustafa Pektemek
Manager:
(Turkey) Şenol Güneş

GK	1	(Turkey) Serkan Kırıntılı
RB	89	(Slovenia) Nejc Skubic
CB	4	(Turkey) Ali Turan	(yellow card) 45'
CB	19	(France) Wilfred Moke
LB	87	(Turkey) Ferhat Öztorun
CM	8	(Turkey) Ali Çamdalı (c)		(substituted off) 76'
CM	68	(France) Mehdi Bourabia	(yellow card) 60'
RM	7	(Turkey) Ömer Ali Şahiner		(substituted off) 82'
AM	12	(Burkina Faso) Abdou Razack Traoré
LM	21	(Ivory Coast) Moryké Fofana
CF	11	(Bosnia and Herzegovina) Deni Milošević		(substituted off) 65'
Substitutes:
GK	25	(Turkey) Abdulaziz Demircan
DF	5	(Turkey) Selim Ay
MF	18	(Bosnia and Herzegovina) Amir Hadžiahmetović
MF	20	(Turkey) Vedat Bora
MF	6	(Denmark) Jens Jønsson		(substituted on) 65'
MF	53	(Turkey) Musa Araz		(substituted on) 76'
FW	39	(Nigeria) Imoh Ezekiel		(substituted on) 82'
Manager:
(Turkey) Mustafa Reşit Akçay
