= Sertan Eser =

Turkish footballer

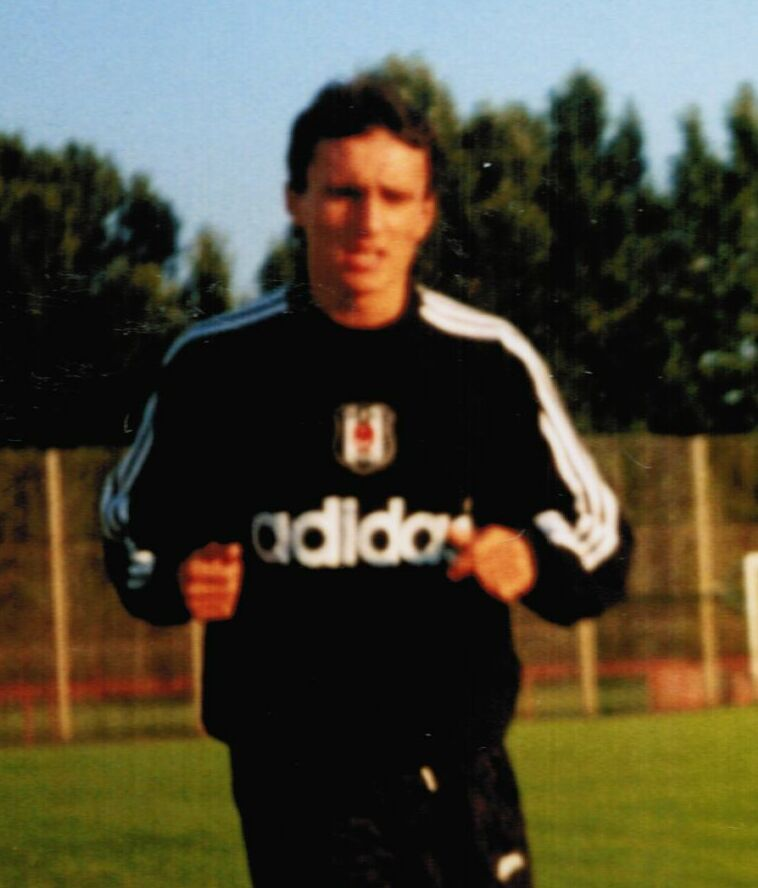
Eser during a friendly match between Besiktas and Türkiyemspor in Berlin, 1995

Sertan Eser (born 18 April 1974 in Germany) is a Turkish former footballer who played as a left forward and striker.

He has played 9 times for the Turkey under-21 team.

He has previously played for Antalya Köy Hizmetleri, Konyaspor, Beşiktaş J.K., Adanaspor, Yimpaş Yozgatspor, Sakaryaspor, Malatyaspor, Ankaraspor, Bursaspor, Diyarbakırspor, Gençlerbirliği, Malatyaspor (again) and İstanbul Büyükşehir Belediyespor.
