= Konyaspor =

Turkish professional football club

- Full name: Konyaspor Kulübü
- Nickname: Anadolu Kartalı (The Anatolian Eagle)
- Founded: 22 June 1922; 104 years ago
- Ground: Konya Municipality Stadium
- Capacity: 41,600
- Coordinates: 37°56′46″N 32°29′17″E
- President: Ömer Atiker
- Head coach: İlhan Palut
- League: Süper Lig
- 2025–26: Süper Lig, 9th of 18
- Website: konyaspor.org.tr
Home colours	Away colours	Third colours

Konyaspor Kulübü (Turkish pronunciation: [konjaspoɾ kulyby], Konya Sports Club), commonly referred to as Konyaspor, is a Turkish professional football club based in Konya, one of the largest cities in central Anatolia. Due to sponsorship agreements, the club is also officially known as TÜMOSAN Konyaspor. The team currently competes in the Süper Lig, the highest level of Turkish football.

Konyaspor was originally founded in 1922, but the modern form of the club was re-established in 1981 through a merger with Konya Gençlerbirliği, adopting green and white as the official colors. These colors symbolize the club’s identity and are inspired by the natural and cultural heritage of the region.

Since 2014, the club has played its home matches at the Konya Metropolitan Municipality Stadium, a modern, multi-purpose venue with a capacity of over 42,000 spectators. The stadium has become known for its passionate fan atmosphere and was also used as a host venue for Turkish national team matches.

Konyaspor is known for its strong support in the region and has steadily grown into one of the more established clubs in Turkish football. In recent years, the club has gained attention for its disciplined structure, consistent performances in domestic competitions, and participation in European tournaments such as the UEFA Europa League.

== History ==
=== Early foundations and restructuring ===
Konyaspor were founded on 22 June 1922 as Konya Gençlerbirliği. The club recognizes this date as its official founding after a 2016 board decision confirming the historical records. As champions of the regional Konya Football League, Konya Gençlerbirliği represented the city at the 1924 Turkish Football Championship, the first nationwide competition in Turkish football, defeating Trabzon İdman Ocağı 3–0 in the first round before losing 2–1 to Anadolu Turan San’atkârangücü in the quarter-finals.

During the reorganization of Turkish league football in the 1960s, Konya’s leading amateur and semi-professional sides were consolidated under one professional team. In 1965 the club began competing under the name Konyaspor in the Second League, adopting black and white as its colours.

A further restructuring took place in 1981 when Konyaspor merged with crosstown rivals Konya İdmanyurdu. The club kept the Konyaspor name and changed its colours to green and white, reflecting İdmanyurdu’s traditional palette. Konyaspor won the Second League in 1987–88 and were promoted to the top division for the first time in their history.

=== First top-flight years and cup progress ===
Konyaspor lasted five seasons in the first league. They played 160 official matches, ending up with 47 wins, 33 draws, and 80 losses. During the 1988–89 season Konyaspor made it to the semi-finals of the Turkish Cup, losing to eventual champions Beşiktaş. In the 1992–93 season, the club were relegated back to the second league.

After spending 10 seasons in the second league, Konyaspor returned to Süper Lig as the title holders of the 2002–03 First League with 68 points. During the 2003–04 season Konyaspor made it to the quarter-finals of the Turkish Cup, but then lost to eventual champions Trabzonspor 2–1 during extra time. In 2004–05 Konyaspor advanced to the quarter-finals beating Beşiktaş 3–1, but then lost to Denizlispor 5–4 on penalty shoot-outs.

In 2008–09 despite the 3–0 home win against Ankaraspor, Konyaspor couldn't avoid relegation as they remained 16th in the table with 38 points which meant their relegation from the Süper Lig. Konyaspor were in the Süper Lig since 2003. However, Konyaspor completed the TFF First League 6th and secured a position in the Promotion Play-offs in 2010. Konyaspor then won the Promotion Play-offs and made an immediate return to the Süper Lig after 1 year. They finished the Play-offs 1st with 7 points beating Adanaspor 3–1 in the first game, Karşıyaka 1–0 in the second and drawing with Altay 2–2 in the final match. But Konyaspor relegated again in the 2010–11 season.

=== Modern era: cup win and European campaigns ===
In October 2014, Aykut Kocaman was appointed head coach of Konyaspor. During his tenure (2014–2017), Konyaspor recorded some of the most successful seasons in their history: in 2015–16, Konyaspor finished third in the Süper Lig with 66 points, the club’s best league placing to that date, and qualified for the UEFA Europa League, marking their first participation in European competition. In 2016–17 they play for the first time in their history in European competitions and draw in Group H with Shakhtar Donetsk, Braga and Gent. They finished the group in fourth place with five losses, one draw and without winning any match. On 31 May 2017 Konyaspor won their first major national trophy, defeated İstanbul Başakşehir to win their first ever Turkish Cup in the club's 95-year history. In the first Turkish Cup final since the 2007–08 season in which none of Istanbul's "big three" clubs Beşiktaş, Fenerbahçe, and Galatasaray were competing, Konyaspor against İstanbul Başakşehir finished regular and extra time tied 0–0 and won on penalty shoot-outs with a result of 4–1.

On 16 June 2017, Aykut Kocaman left Konyaspor to become Fenerbahçe head coach; he was replaced by Mustafa Reşit Akçay. In 2017–18, Konyaspor opened the season by beating Beşiktaş 2–1 to win the Turkish Super Cup—the first Super Cup in club history. The league campaign ended 15th (36 pts). In 2018–19, Aykut Kocaman returned and the team finished 8th. In September 2019, the club signed a name-sponsorship deal with İttifak Holding (3+2 years). In 2019–20, Konyaspor avoided relegation, closing 13th in the pandemic season.

In February 2021, İlhan Palut was appointed following İsmail Kartal’s departure and led Konyaspor to 11th place in 2020–21. In 2021–22, Palut’s side finished 3rd with 68 points, the second-best league finish in club history, earning a berth in the UEFA Europa Conference League. On 11 January 2022, Konyaspor defender Ahmet Yılmaz Çalık died in a traffic accident near Ankara. Çalık, who had joined the club in 2020, had become a regular starter and a respected figure in the dressing room. In tribute, Konyaspor retired his number 6 shirt, and several Süper Lig clubs and the Turkish Football Federation expressed condolences. In the same season, Konyaspor ultimately placed third in the final 2021–22 Süper Lig table matching the club’s second-best league finish and qualified for European competition the following season. In July 2022, Konyaspor returned to Europe and defeated BATE Borisov 5–0 on aggregate in the Conference League second qualifying round (3–0 away, 2–0 home) before exiting to FC Vaduz in the third qualifying round (1–1 away, 2–4 home).

In January 2023, the club parted company with Palut while sitting seventh; Aleksandar Stanojević was appointed the next day and the league campaign ended 8th (51 pts). In November 2023, Hakan Keleş succeeded Stanojević, and in January 2024 the job passed to Fahrudin Omerović. In April 2024, former club captain Ali Çamdalı was named head coach and, in June, signed a 1+1 contract. Konyaspor finished the 2023–24 Süper Lig 16th with 41 points; on the final day they lost 3–1 to Galatasaray, a result that confirmed the title for the Istanbul side. On 1 November 2024, Konyaspor appointed Recep Uçar as head coach on a deal running through 2025–26. In the 2024–25 Süper Lig season, Konyaspor finished 11th, collecting 46 points from 36 matches with a record of 13 wins, 7 draws, and 16 losses. The mid-table finish marked an improvement on the previous campaign’s 16th place (41 points) and provided a more stable platform heading into 2025–26.

== Stadium ==
The Konya Metropolitan Municipality Stadium (often styled Konya Büyükşehir Stadyumu, known for sponsorship at times as Torku Arena/Medaş Konya Büyükşehir Stadyumu) is an all-seater, multi-purpose venue in Selçuklu, Konya. Construction began in 2012 and the ground opened in 2014, replacing the old Konya Atatürk Stadium as Konyaspor’s home. The venue has an official capacity of about 41,600, a 105 × 68 m natural-grass pitch and a full roof cover.

Since 2014, the stadium has hosted both Konyaspor fixtures and selected matches of the Turkey national team. On 6 September 2015, Turkey defeated the Netherlands 3–0 here in UEFA Euro 2016 qualifying, a match that drew a record attendance of 41,007 at the venue. The complex includes concourse retail and hospitality areas and is connected to wider municipal transport infrastructure serving the Selçuklu district.

=== Old stadium ===
The Konya Atatürk Stadium served as Konyaspor’s primary home ground from the early 1950s until 2014. Built in 1950 (with use reported from 1952), it was a multi-purpose arena with a running track and a 105 × 68 m grass pitch. After seating changes in the 2000s, capacity was a little above 22,000.

After 2014, the old ground continued to stage occasional lower-league matches before demolition works began in 2018. The site has since been redeveloped as the Konya Millet Bahçesi (Nation’s Garden), a municipal park project delivered by the Konya Metropolitan Municipality.

== Colors and crest ==
Konyaspor’s official club colors are green and white, adopted in 1981 following the club’s merger with Konya İdmanyurdu. Prior to the merger, the club played in black and white from 1965 (when it was restructured as Konyaspor after the fusion of various local teams including Konya Gençlerbirliği, Meramspor and Çimentospor). The switch to green and white was made to reflect İdmanyurdu’s identity and to represent Konya’s agricultural and spiritual heritage.

The current club crest features a double-headed eagle (iki başlı kartal), a historic Seljuk Empire symbol, referencing Konya’s role as the capital of the Seljuks in the 12th–13th centuries. The emblem is presented in green and white, encircled by the club name (Konyaspor) and foundation year (1922). The use of the double-headed eagle reflects strength, vision in two directions, and a proud connection to Konya’s Anatolian heritage.

In various kits throughout history, green-and-white vertical stripes have been the primary motif, though alternate kits have included black, grey, and occasionally turquoise or gold accents. The double-headed eagle remains central to the club’s branding, fan identity, and official merchandise.

=== Kit manufacturers and shirt sponsors ===
Years	Kit manufacturers	Shirt sponsors
1998–04	Unknown	Kombassan
2004–09	Lotto	Turkcell
2009–10	Lotto	Bank Asya
2010–12	Lotto	Turkcell
2012–13	Lotto	Torku
2013–16	Hummel	Torku
2016–18	Hummel	Spor Toto^{1} / Turkish Airlines^{2}
2018–19	Nike	Spor Toto
2019–21	Lotto	Spor Toto
2021–22	Macron	Atiker
2022–23	New Balance	Arabam.com^{1} / Turkish Airlines^{2}
2023–25	New Balance	Tümosan
2025–	Hummel	Tümosan

^{1} ^{Main sponsorship} ^{2} ^{Europe Main sponsorship}

== Supporters ==
Konyaspor’s fanbase is widely known, both in Konya and across Turkey. The club’s primary fan club is Nalçacılar, established in the mid-1990s and named after the Nalçacı district of Konya. The group is recognized for its choreographed displays (tifos), large banners, and organized chants during home and away games.

Home matches at the Konya Metropolitan Municipality Stadium often see coordinated color shows and large-scale card choreographies. The supporters are known for their “12. Adam” (12th Man) slogan, symbolizing their impact on the team’s performance. During critical matches, particularly against the “big three” (Beşiktaş, Fenerbahçe, Galatasaray), Konyaspor fans have gained attention for their volume and dedication.

The fan culture extends beyond Konya; there are official supporters’ associations in cities such as Ankara, Istanbul, and various parts of Europe, reflecting the widespread Konya diaspora. Konyaspor fans are also known for their respectful atmosphere during national team matches played in Konya, earning praise from both Turkish and international media during UEFA Euro 2016 qualifiers for their organized and passionate support.

== Rivalries ==
Konyaspor’s main historical rivalry was with Konya İdmanyurdu, their cross-town opponents until the clubs merged in 1981. The fixture, known locally as the Konya derby, was one of the city’s most passionate matchups through the 1960s and 1970s. The rivalry formally ended after the merger, which saw Konyaspor adopt İdmanyurdu’s green and white colors while keeping the Konyaspor name. In the modern Süper Lig era, Konyaspor’s most prominent rivalry is with Kayserispor, largely due to geographical proximity, regional pride in Central Anatolia, and a series of tense matches, including high-stakes fixtures in relegation and European qualification battles. Although not officially a “derby” in classical terms, the match is often referred to as the “Anatolian Derby” in Turkish media.

Konyaspor also shares tense rivalries with clubs like Ankaragücü and Antalyaspor. Additionally, matches against Istanbul’s “Big Three” (Beşiktaş, Fenerbahçe, and Galatasaray) are considered high-intensity due to the broader Anatolia vs Istanbul narrative in Turkish football. Konyaspor’s victories in the 2016–17 Turkish Cup final (vs İstanbul Başakşehir) and the 2017 Turkish Super Cup (vs Beşiktaş) further elevated the club’s profile in such fixtures.

== Past seasons ==
=== Results of League and Cup Competitions by Season ===
Season	League table										Turkish Cup	UEFA	Top scorer	
Season	League	Pos	P	W	D	L	GF	GA	GD	Pts	Turkish Cup	UEFA	Player	Goals
1965–66	1. Lig	9th	20	6	4	10	30	28	2	22	R2	N/A	Hikmet Deniz	5
1966–67	1. Lig	9th	30	10	8	12	28	44	–16	38	R2	N/A	Ali Palalı	7
1967–68	1. Lig	11th	38	13	10	15	39	55	–16	49	N/A	N/A	Ahmet Özbaş	8
1968–69	1. Lig	16th↓	34	11	8	15	33	39	–6	41	N/A	N/A	Fahrettin Yılbaşı	8
1969–70	2. Lig	6th	40	20	9	11	69	28	41	69	N/A	N/A	Naci Renklibay	N/A
1970–71	2. Lig	1st↑	28	21	4	3	61	17	44	67	N/A	N/A	Naci Renklibay	N/A
1971–72	1. Lig	9th	30	9	10	11	21	24	–3	37	R1	N/A	Ertan Ertek	6
1972–73	1. Lig	4th	30	11	9	10	24	20	4	42	N/A	N/A	Hikmet Deniz	7
1973–74	1. Lig	6th	30	10	12	8	27	27	0	42	N/A	N/A	Hikmet Deniz	4
1974–75	1. Lig	13th	30	9	8	13	20	32	–12	35	N/A	N/A	N/A	N/A
1975–76	1. Lig	4th	30	11	10	9	23	19	4	43	R2	N/A	N/A	N/A
1976–77	1. Lig	10th	30	9	9	12	20	34	–14	36	R3	N/A	N/A	N/A
1977–78	1. Lig	9th	32	11	8	13	34	36	–2	41	R2	N/A	N/A	N/A
1978–79	1. Lig	16th↓	30	5	7	18	15	49	–34	22	R3	N/A	N/A	N/A
1979–80	2. Lig	5th↑	18	10	5	13	32	33	–1	35	R3	N/A	N/A	N/A
1980–81	1. Lig	11th	34	12	7	15	32	45	–13	43	R4	N/A	N/A	N/A
1981–82	1. Lig	4th	28	9	13	6	28	25	3	40	L32	N/A	N/A	N/A
1982–83	1. Lig	9th	30	9	10	11	24	31	–7	37	R2	N/A	N/A	N/A
1983–84	1. Lig	8th	32	11	10	11	33	34	–1	43	R2	N/A	N/A	N/A
1984–85	1. Lig	2nd	30	15	9	6	46	32	14	54	R2	N/A	Varol Bülbül	14
1985–86	1. Lig	4th	32	20	3	9	54	33	21	63	R2	N/A	Mete Atanır	19
1986–87	1. Lig	2nd	34	23	10	1	62	14	48	70	R1	N/A	Namık	17
1987–88	1. Lig	1st↑	32	19	8	5	49	27	22	65	L32	N/A	N/A	N/A
1988–89	Süper Lig	8th	36	14	4	18	43	59	–16	46	SF	N/A	Kayhan Kaynak	11
1989–90	Süper Lig	7th	34	13	7	14	41	42	–1	46	L16	N/A	Saffet Sancaklı	10
1990–91	Süper Lig	12th	30	10	4	16	33	45	–12	34	L16	N/A	Ali Rıza Yılmaz	7
1991–92	Süper Lig	12th	30	8	8	14	28	34	–6	32	R5	N/A	Suat Kaya	7
1992–93	Süper Lig	16th↓	30	2	10	18	29	85	–56	16	R5	N/A	Levent Devrim	4
1993–94	1. Lig	3rd	33	18	6	9	62	34	28	60	R5	N/A	Sertan Eser	20
1994–95	1. Lig	7th	32	12	9	11	40	42	–2	45	R3	N/A	Nurhan Yıldız	12
1995–96	1. Lig	10th	36	15	4	17	42	48	–6	49	R3	N/A	Erkan Taşdemir	8
1996–97	1. Lig	3rd	33	14	7	12	53	36	17	49	R2	N/A	N/A	N/A
1997–98	1. Lig	4th	32	14	11	7	51	29	22	53	R4	N/A	N/A	N/A
1998–99	1. Lig	8th	32	11	8	13	40	51	–11	41	R2	N/A	N/A	N/A
1999–2000	1. Lig	5th	38	22	7	9	63	34	29	73	N/A	N/A	N/A	N/A
2000–01	1. Lig	3rd	37	21	7	9	78	39	39	70	R3	N/A	N/A	N/A
2001–02	1. Lig	5th	38	20	8	10	70	45	25	68	R2	N/A	Yunus Altun	28
2002–03	1. Lig	1st↑	34	20	8	6	55	28	27	68	R3	N/A	Adem Akın	13
2003–04	Süper Lig	11th	34	10	14	10	53	54	–1	44	QF	N/A	Zafer Biryol	25
2004–05	Süper Lig	8th	34	11	12	11	62	62	0	45	QF	N/A	Zafer Biryol	21
2005–06	Süper Lig	7th	34	12	10	12	39	43	–4	46	GS	N/A	Murat Hacıoğlu	8
2006–07	Süper Lig	9th	34	12	9	13	42	44	–2	45	GS	N/A	Tayfun Türkmen	10
2007–08	Süper Lig	14th	34	10	6	18	37	64	–27	36	R2	N/A	Murat Hacıoğlu	10
2008–09	Süper Lig	16th↓	34	10	8	16	35	46	–11	38	GS	N/A	Veysel Cihan	8
2009–10	1. Lig	6th↑	37	17	11	9	48	40	8	62	R2	N/A	Erdal Kılıçaslan	7
2010–11	Süper Lig	17th↓	34	4	12	18	28	49	–21	24	R3	N/A	Peter Grajciar	7
2011–12	1. Lig	5th	36	16	11	9	35	31	4	59	R2	N/A	Marcin Robak	8
2012–13	1. Lig	6th↑	37	16	10	11	42	37	5	58	R3	N/A	Erdal Kılıçarslan	13
2013–14	Süper Lig	7th	34	11	9	14	48	45	3	42	R3	N/A	Theofanis Gekas	13
2014–15	Süper Lig	8th	34	12	10	12	30	39	–9	46	L16	N/A	Hasan Kabze	9
2015–16	Süper Lig	3rd	34	19	9	6	44	33	11	66	SF	N/A	Riad Bajic	9
2016–17	Süper Lig	9th	34	11	10	13	40	45	–5	43	W	GS	Riad Bajic	17
2017–18	Süper Lig	15th	34	9	9	16	38	42	–4	36	QF	GS	Nejc Skubic	9
2018–19	Süper Lig	8th	34	9	17	8	40	38	2	44	R4	N/A	Ömer Ali Şahiner	8
2019–20	Süper Lig	13th	34	8	12	14	35	52	–17	36	R4	N/A	Farouk Miya	8
2020–21	Süper Lig	11th	40	12	14	14	49	48	1	50	QF	N/A	Artem Kravets	9
2021–22	Süper Lig	3rd	38	20	8	10	66	45	21	68	L16	N/A	Sokol Cikalleshi	10
2022–23	Süper Lig	8th	36	12	15	9	49	41	8	51	L16	3QR	Mame Diouf	9
2023–24	Süper Lig	16th	38	9	14	15	40	53	–13	41	QF	N/A	Sokol Cikalleshi	12
2024–25	Süper Lig	11th	36	13	7	16	45	50	–5	46	SF	N/A	Blaž Kramer	9
2025–26	Süper Lig	TBD												

=== League participations ===
- Süper Lig: 1988–93, 2003–09, 2010–11, 2013–
- 1. Lig: 1965–69, 1971–79, 1980–88, 1993–03, 2009–10, 2011–13
- 2. Lig: 1969–71, 1979–80

== Honours ==
=== Leagues ===
- 1. Lig
  - Winners (2): 1987–88, 2002–03
- 2. Lig
  - Winners (1): 1970–71

=== Cups ===
- Turkish Cup
  - Winners (1): 2016–17
- Turkish Super Cup
  - Winners (1): 2017

== Konyaspor in Europe ==
Konyaspor made their debut in European competition in the 2016–17 UEFA Europa League, following their third-place finish in the Süper Lig the previous season under head coach Aykut Kocaman. They were drawn into Group H, facing Shakhtar Donetsk, Braga, and Gent. The club finished bottom of the group with one point, earning a 1–1 draw at home to Braga but suffering five defeats.

Konyaspor returned to the Europa League in 2017–18, again entering directly into the group stage (Group I) after winning the 2016–17 Turkish Cup. They competed against Salzburg, Marseille, and Vitória de Guimarães. The club earned 5 points from six games, recording a win over Guimarães (2–1), and home draws with Salzburg (0–0) and Marseille (1–1), but ultimately finished third and did not advance to the knockout stage.

After placing third in the Süper Lig in 2021–22 under İlhan Palut, Konyaspor qualified for the 2022–23 UEFA Europa Conference League. In the second qualifying round, they eliminated BATE Borisov with a 5–0 aggregate victory (3–0 away, 2–0 home). In the third qualifying round, however, they were eliminated by FC Vaduz with a 5–3 aggregate loss (1–1 away, 2–4 home).

As of 2025, Konyaspor have played 16 official UEFA matches, recording 3 wins, 5 draws, and 8 losses, with 14 goals scored and 23 conceded across both the Europa League and Conference League campaigns.

=== Summary ===
As of 11 August 2022

Competition	Pld	W	D	L	GF	GA	GD
UEFA Europa League	12	1	4	7	6	18	–12
UEFA Europa Conference League	4	2	1	1	8	5	+3
Total	16	3	5	8	14	23	–9

=== European participation ===
Season	Competition	Round	Club	Home	Away	Aggregate
2016–17	UEFA Europa League	GS	(Ukraine) Shakhtar Donetsk	0–1	0–4	4th
2016–17	UEFA Europa League	GS	(Belgium) Gent	0–1	0–2	4th
2016–17	UEFA Europa League	GS	(Portugal) Braga	1–1	1–3	4th
2017–18	UEFA Europa League	GS	(Austria) Salzburg	0–2	0–0	3rd
2017–18	UEFA Europa League	GS	(France) Marseille	1–1	0–1	3rd
2017–18	UEFA Europa League	GS	(Portugal) Vitória de Guimarães	2–1	1–1	3rd
2022–23	UEFA Europa Conference League	2QR	(Belarus) BATE Borisov	2–0	3–0	5–0
2022–23	UEFA Europa Conference League	3QR	(Liechtenstein) Vaduz	2–4	1–1	3–5

=== UEFA ranking ===
As of 21 June 2023

Season	Rank	Points	Ref.
2017	162 ▲	9.840	
2018	154 ▲	7.160	
2019	154	7.000	
2020	161 ▼	7.000	
2021	162 ▼	7.000	
2022	248 ▼	5.420	
2023	206 ▲	6.420	

== Players ==
=== Current squad ===
As of 2 September 2026

Note: Flags indicate national team as defined under FIFA eligibility rules; some limited exceptions apply. Players may hold more than one non-FIFA nationality.

No.	Pos.	Nation	Player
1	GK	TUR	Deniz Ertaş
2	DF	TUR	Ahmet Oğuz
3	DF	TUR	Arif Boşluk
4	DF	TUR	Adil Demirbağ (captain)
5	DF	TUR	Uğurcan Yazğılı
7	MF	POR	Diogo Gonçalves
8	MF	SRB	Marko Jevtović
9	MF	TUR	Deniz Türüç
10	MF	MKD	Enis Bardhi
11	FW	COD	Jackson Muleka
13	GK	TUR	Bahadır Han Güngördü
15	DF	NGR	Chidozie Awaziem
16	DF	TUR	Ata Yanık
17	DF	CGO	Yhoan Andzouana

No.	Pos.	Nation	Player
19	FW	GAM	Ebrima Colley (on loan from Young Boys)
22	DF	TUR	Rayyan Baniya
24	MF	AUT	Mücahit İbrahimoğlu
25	MF	TUR	Ömer Çobanoğlu
26	DF	COD	Arthur Masuaku
29	GK	TUR	Egemen Aydın
41	DF	BRA	Da Mata
42	DF	EGY	Mostafa Mohamed
45	MF	TUR	Emir Bars
65	GK	TUR	Emir Gündoğdu
66	MF	HUN	Rajmund Tóth
77	MF	TUR	Melih İbrahimoğlu
91	FW	FRA	Jean-Luc Dompé
94	FW	TUR	Enis Destan

=== Out on loan ===
Note: Flags indicate national team as defined under FIFA eligibility rules; some limited exceptions apply. Players may hold more than one non-FIFA nationality.

No.	Pos.	Nation	Player
—	DF	TUR	Utku Eriş (at Kırklarelispor until 30 June 2027)
—	DF	CIV	Eric Konaté (at KF Laçi until 30 June 2027)
—	DF	TUR	Abdurrahman Üresin (at Güzide Gebze SK until 30 June 2027)
—	MF	GUI	Ibrahima Bah (at FK Kukësi until 30 June 2027)
—	MF	TUR	Melih Bostan (at Ümraniyespor until 30 June 2027)
—	MF	TUR	Esat Buğa (at Elazığspor until 30 June 2027)
—	MF	CIV	Mohamed Fofana (at FK Kukësi until 30 June 2027)

No.	Pos.	Nation	Player
—	MF	KOR	Jo Jin-ho (at Batman Petrolspor until 30 June 2027)
—	MF	TUR	Adem Eren Kabak (at Mardin 1969 Spor until 30 June 2027)
—	FW	TUR	Kaan Akyazı (at İnegölspor until 30 June 2027)
—	MF	TUR	Berke Özçelik (at Erciyes 38 FSK until 30 June 2027)
—	FW	TUR	Tunahan Taşçı (at Ümraniyespor until 30 June 2027)
—	FW	TUR	Eren Yağmur (at KF Laçi until 30 June 2027)

=== Retired numbers ===
No.	Player	Nat.	Pos.
6	Ahmet Yılmaz Çalık	(Turkey)	DF

== Non-playing staff ==
=== Administrative Staff ===
Position	Name
President	Ömer Korkmaz
Second President	Adem Bulut
Vice President	Önder Çınar
Vice President	Halil İbrahim İncer
Vice President	Yunus Derebağ
Vice President	Mustafa Başoda
Vice President	Mehmet Eryılmaz
Vice President	Mahmut Güzel
General Secretary	Ayşe Atsan
Associate President	Osman Öztürk
Associate President	Ali Tınkır
Associate President	Mehmet Ali Görgülü
Associate President	Hamdi Parmak
Associate President	Oktay Dalkıran
Board Member	Yusuf Küçükbakırcı
Board Member	Osman Baharoğlu
Board Member	Mustafa Dutar
Board Member	Halil Bölükbaşı
Board Member	Ahmet Ayan
Board Member	Nuri Kaymak
Board Member	Mustafa Damkacı
Board Member	Alper Sungur
Board Member	Erkut Çağlar Çelik

=== Technical Staff ===
Position	Name
Head coach	Çağdaş Atan
Administrative Manager	Hüseyin Bilgin
Coach	Fevzi Korkmaz
Coach	Ekrem Dağ
Goalkeeper Coach	Ferhat Odabaşı
Performance Coach	Can Emre Kaplanoglu
Performance Coach	Serhat Sezgin
Analyst Coach	Oğuzhan Arslan
Analyst Coach	Fatih Ustalı
Club Doctor	Dr. Gökhan Özhan
Physiotherapist	İlker Aribaş
Physiotherapist	Halit Dığrak
Physiotherapist	Ömer Fidan
Masseur	Mehmet Can
Masseur	Fatih Tobakçal
Translator	A. Tarık Dikmen
Translator	Emre Görmez
Photographer	Seyit Ali Gülcan
Equipment Manager	Murat Ağcadağlı
Equipment Manager	Fevzi Keskin
Equipment Manager	Ramazan Çetintaş
Transportation Manager	Ali Kandak

== Player statistics ==
As of 2025, Ömer Ali Şahiner holds Konyaspor’s club record for appearances (298, 2012–2021), while Zafer Biryol is the all-time top scorer (46 goals, 2003–2005). Among foreign players, Riad Bajić leads with 33 goals across 119 matches (2015–2020). Additional verification: Player tenures and match breakdowns can be cross-checked against TFF registration/contract logs and career statistics (e.g., Nejc Skubic and Sokol Cikalleshi).

Combined club records (appearances and scorers)

Years	Player	Apps	Goals
Most appearances
2012–2021	(Turkey) Ömer Ali Şahiner	298	36
2016–2022	(Slovenia) Nejc Skubic	254	19
2009–2020	(Turkey) Selim Ay	209	0
2020–	(Brazil) Guilherme	200	13
2002–2009	(Turkey) Ömer Gündostu	199	0
2003–2010	(Turkey) Tayfun Türkmen	169	30
2002–2007	(Turkey) Yasin Çelik	152	0
1985–1992	(Turkey) Salih Eken	149	0
2003–2010	(Turkey) Zafer Demir	136	0
1965–1974	(Turkey) Hikmet Deniz	135	19
All-time top scorers
2003–2005	(Turkey) Zafer Biryol	70	46
2012–2021	(Turkey) Ömer Ali Şahiner	298	36
1985–1987	(Turkey) Mete Adanır	54	33
2003–2010	(Turkey) Tayfun Türkmen	165	30
2000–2002	(Turkey) Yunus Altun	37	28
2008–2014	(Turkey) Erdal Kılıçaslan	127	26
1992–1994	(Turkey) Sertan Eser	34	21
1993–1994	(Turkey) Muammer Nurlu	34	20
1965–1974	(Turkey) Hikmet Deniz	135	19
1984–1987	(Turkey) Varol Bülbül	35	18
Top foreign scorers
2015–2020	(Bosnia and Herzegovina) Riad Bajić	119	33
2020–2024	(Albania) Sokol Cikalleshi	111	30
2016–2022	(Slovenia) Nejc Skubic	254	19
2016–2023	(Bosnia and Herzegovina) Amir Hadžiahmetović	199	17
2016–2021	(Bosnia and Herzegovina) Deni Milošević	190	17
2014–2017	(Bulgaria) Dimitar Rangelov	94	17
2007–2013	(Portugal) Neca	63	17
2014–2017	(Serbia) Jagoš Vuković	109	14
2020–	(Brazil) Guilherme	200	13
2013–2014	(Greece) Theofanis Gekas	24	13

Totals include only; league, domestic cups, UEFA; friendlies excluded.

== Managers history ==
In 2014–2017, under head coach Aykut Kocaman, Konyaspor recorded one of the club’s most successful periods: in 2015–16 the team finished third in the Süper Lig with 66 points, earning qualification for the UEFA Europa League, and on 31 May 2017 won the Turkish Cup after a 0–0 final against İstanbul Başakşehir decided 4–1 on penalties. On 6 August 2017, under Mustafa Reşit Akçay, Konyaspor won the Turkish Super Cup by defeating Beşiktaş 2–1, the club’s first Super Cup triumph. In 2021–22, under İlhan Palut, the team again finished third with 68 points, qualifying for the UEFA Europa Conference League. Since 1 November 2024, Konyaspor have been managed by Recep Uçar, appointed on a deal running through 2025–26; his previous roles include spells at Ümraniyespor and Kayserispor.

Season(s)	Name
~~"1922–69"~~
1969–70	(Turkey) Fahrettin Cansever
~~"1970–74"~~
1974–75	(Turkey) Fahrettin Cansever
1980–81	(Turkey) Kazım Admış
1984	(Turkey) Zeynel Soyuer
1984–85	(Turkey) Arda Vural
1985	(Turkey) Coşkun Süer
1986	(Turkey) Kadri Aytaç
1986–87	(Turkey) Nevzat Güzelırmak
1987–88	(Turkey) Özkan Sümer
1988–89	(Turkey) Erol Togay
1988–89	(Turkey) Şener Dal
1989	(Turkey) Ömer Duran
1989	(Turkey) Arif Çetinkaya
1989–90	(Socialist Federal Republic of Yugoslavia) Zoran Čolaković
1990	(Turkey) Tezcan Uzcan
1990–91	(Turkey) Ömer Duran
1991	(Turkey) Ömer Zengin
1991–92	(Turkey) Ömer Duran
1992	(Poland) Franciszek Smuda
1992	(Turkey) Arif Çetinkaya
1992	(Turkey) Murat Özgen
1992	(Turkey) Hüsnü Macuni
1992–93	(Turkey) Ömer Zengin
1993	(Turkey) Arif Çetinkaya
1993	(Turkey) Naci Renklibay
1993	(Turkey) Aldoğan Argo
1994	(Turkey) Gündüz Tekin Onay
1994	(Turkey) Müjdat Yalman
1994–95	(Turkey) Erkan Kural
1995–96	(Turkey) İsmet Arıkan
1997	(Turkey) Ali Hoşfikirer
1997	(Turkey) Ahmet Akçan
1997–98	(Turkey) Kemal Kılıç
1998	(Turkey) Sadi Tekelioğlu
1998–99	(Turkey) Yılmaz Vural
1999	(Turkey) Kemal Kılıç
1999–00	(Turkey) Giray Bulak
2000	(Turkey) Rıdvan Dilmen
2000	(Bosnia and Herzegovina) Nenad Bijedić

Season(s)	Manager
2000–01	(Turkey) Mustafa Çapanoğlu
2001	(Turkey) Ziya Doğan
2001–02	(Turkey) Mustafa Çapanoğlu
2002–03	(Turkey) Hüsnü Özkara
2003–04	(Turkey) Mehmet Yıldırım
2004	(Turkey) Tevfik Lav
2004	(Turkey) Kemal Özdeş
2004	(Turkey) Sakıp Özberk
2004	(Turkey) Hamza Hamzaoğlu
2004–05	(Bosnia and Herzegovina) Safet Sušić
2005–06	(Turkey) Aykut Kocaman
2006–07	(Turkey) Nurullah Sağlam
2007–08	(Turkey) Ünal Karaman
2008	(Turkey) Raşit Çetiner
2008	(Turkey) Nevzat Dinçbudak
2008–09	(Turkey) Giray Bulak
2009	(Turkey) Ünal Karaman
2009–10	(Turkey) Hüsnü Özkara
2010	(Turkey) Fuat Yaman
2010–11	(Turkey) Ziya Doğan
2011	(Turkey) Yılmaz Vural
2011–12	(Turkey) Osman Özdemir
2012	(Turkey) Hüsnü Özkara
2012	(Turkey) Muharrem Aydın
2012–13	(Turkey) Uğur Tütüneker
2013–14	(Turkey) Mesut Bakkal
2014–17	(Turkey) Aykut Kocaman
2017	(Turkey) Mustafa Reşit Akçay
2017–18	(Turkey) Mehmet Özdilek
2018	(Turkey) Sergen Yalçın
2018	(Turkey) Rıza Çalımbay
2018–20	(Turkey) Aykut Kocaman
2020	(Turkey) Bülent Korkmaz
2020–21	(Turkey) İsmail Kartal
2021–23	(Turkey) İlhan Palut
2023	(Serbia) Aleksandar Stanojević
2023–24	(Turkey) Hakan Keleş
2024	(Bosnia and Herzegovina) Fahrudin Omerović
2024	(Turkey) Ali Çamdalı
2024–25	(Turkey) Recep Uçar
2025–	(Turkey) Çağdaş Atan

== See also ==
- Konya İdman Yurdu
