= 2016–17 Turkish Cup =

Ziraat Turkish Cup

Tournament details
- Country: Turkey
- Teams: 158

Final positions
- Champions: Konyaspor
- Runners-up: İstanbul Başakşehir
- UEFA Europa League: Konyaspor

The 2016–17 Turkish Cup (Turkish: Türkiye Kupası) is the 55th season of the Turkish Cup. Ziraat Bankası is the sponsor of the tournament, thus the sponsored name is Ziraat Turkish Cup. The winners will earn a berth in the group stage of the 2017–18 UEFA Europa League, and also qualify for the 2017 Turkish Super Cup.

== Competition format ==
Round	Clubs remaining	Clubs involved	Winners from previous round	New entries this round	Leagues entering at this round
Preliminary round	158	28	0	28	Regional Amateur League (AL)
First round	144	72	14	58	Third League (3L)
Second round	108	98	36	62	Second League (2L), First League (1L), Super League (SL) (11-18)
Third round	59	54	49	5	Super League (6-10)
Group stage	32	32	27	5	Super League (1-5)
Round of 16	16	16	16	0	
Quarter finals	8	8	8	0	
Semi finals	4	4	4	0	
Final	2	2	2	0	

== Preliminary round ==
- 28 teams from Regional Amateur League competed in this round. Seeds are for informative purpose only; they did not apply in this round's draw.

League	SEEDED	UNSEEDED	League
AL	Iğdır Aras	Edirnespor	AL
AL	Yeni Amasyaspor	Yeşil Kırşehirspor	AL
AL	Yozgatspor 1959 FK	Altınova Belediyespor	AL
AL	Adıyaman 1954 SK	Serhat Ardahan	AL
AL	Bartınspor	Bucak Bld.Oğuzhan	AL
AL	Karaman Belediyespor	68 Aksaray Bld.	AL
AL	Nevşehirspor GK	Ağrı 1970 SK	AL
AL	Kurtalanspor	Artvin Hopaspor	AL
AL	Eğirdirspor	Ayancık Belediyespor	AL
AL	Sarıkamış Bld.	Bozüyük Vitraspor	AL
AL	Kilis Belediyespor	Hakkarispor FK	AL
AL	Utaş Uşakspor	Mardin 47 Spor	AL
AL	Tatvan G.Birliği	Muşspor FC	AL
AL	Osmaniyespor FK	Yapraklı Belediyespor	AL

- 14 teams (50%) from Regional Amateur League qualified for the next round.
- 9 seeded (64%) and 5 unseeded (36%) teams qualified for the next round.
- Biggest upsets were Hakkarispor FK (no ranking) and 68 Aksaray Bld (no ranking) eliminating Tatvan G.Birliği (ranked 189) and Osmaniyespor FK (ranked 202), respectively.
- Lowest ranked teams qualified for the next round were 68 Aksaray Bld (no ranking), Hakkarispor FK (no ranking) and Muşspor FC (no ranking); highest ranked team got eliminated was Adıyaman 1954 SK (ranked 145).

HOME		AWAY
Eğirdirspor	0 - 1	Utaş Uşakspor
Mardin 47 Spor	1 - 1 (4-5 p)	Kurtalanspor
Bucak Bld.Oğuzhan	1 - 1 (4-5 p)	Karaman Belediyespor
Hakkarispor FK	3 - 1 (a.e.t.)	Tatvan G.Birliği
Muşspor FC	1 - 1 (4-2 p)	Ağrı 1970 SK
Serhat Ardahan	2 - 1	Artvin Hopaspor
Iğdır Aras	2 - 1	Sarıkamış Bld.
Bartınspor	2 - 0	Bozüyük Vitraspor
Yapraklı Belediyespor	1 - 10	Yozgatspor 1959 FK
Kilis Belediyespor	2 - 0	Adıyaman 1954 SK
Yeşil Kırşehirspor	1 - 2	Nevşehirspor GK
Altınova Belediyespor	1 - 3	Edirnespor
Ayancık Belediyespor	1 - 10	Yeni Amasyaspor
Osmaniyespor FK	1 - 2	68 Aksaray Bld.

== First round ==
- 58 teams from Third League and 14 teams from Regional Amateur League competed in this round. Seeds are for informative purpose only; they did not apply in this round's draw.

League	SEEDED	UNSEEDED	League
3L	Kartalspor	Yomraspor	3L
3L	Bayrampaşa	Manavgatspor	3L
3L	Ankara Demirspor	Düzcespor	3L
3L	Pazarspor	Payasspor	3L
3L	Tarsus İdman Yurdu	Silivrispor	3L
3L	Orduspor	Bergama Belediyespor	3L
3L	Kızılcabölükspor	Manisa BBSK	3L
3L	Diyarbekirspor	Kozan Belediyespor	3L
3L	Bayburt Grup Özel İdare	Van BBSK	3L
3L	Tire 1922	Cizre Spor	3L
3L	BB Bodrumspor	Kütahyaspor	3L
3L	Çorum Belediyespor	Araklı 1961 SK	3L
3L	Düzyurtspor	Türk Metal Kırıkkale	3L
3L	Beylerbeyispor	Erbaaspor	3L
3L	Ankara Adliyespor	Halide Edip Adıvar SK	3L
3L	Erzin Belediyespor	Elaziz Belediyespor	3L
3L	Gölcükspor	Afjet Afyonspor	3L
3L	Orhangazispor	Kocaelispor	3L
3L	Yeşil Bursa	Sultangazispor	3L
3L	Darıca Gençlerbirliği	Muğlaspor	3L
3L	Kemerspor 2003	Sarayönü Bld.	3L
3L	24 Erzincanspor	12 Bingölspor	3L
3L	Sancaktepe Belediyespor	Iğdır Aras	AL
3L	Tekirdağspor	Bartınspor	AL
3L	Dersimspor	Karaman Belediyespor	AL
3L	Denizli BBSK	Nevşehirspor GK	AL
3L	Kırıkhanspor	Kurtalanspor	AL
3L	Dardanelspor	Kilis Belediyespor	AL
3L	Derincespor	Utaş Uşakspor	AL
3L	Maltepespor	Edirnespor	AL
3L	Sultanbeyli Belediyespor	Serhat Ardahan	AL
3L	Çatalcaspor	68 Aksaray Bld.	AL
3L	Altay	Yeni Amasyaspor	AL
3L	Sakaryaspor	Hakkarispor FK	AL
3L	Batman Petrolspor	Muşspor FC	AL
3L	Karacabey Birlikspor	Yozgatspor 1959 FK	AL

- 31 teams (53%) from Third League and 5 teams (36%) from Regional Amateur League qualified for the next round.
- 19 seeded (53%) and 17 unseeded (47%) teams qualified for the next round.
- Biggest upset was Serhat Ardahan (ranked 228) eliminating Bayburt Grup Özel İdare (ranked 81).
- Lowest ranked team qualified for the next round was Serhat Ardahan (ranked 228); highest ranked team got eliminated was Ankara Demirspor (ranked 75).

Team 1	Score	Team 2
Cizrespor	4 - 0	Hakkarispor
Orduspor	0 - 1	Türk Metal Kırıkkalespor
Pazarspor	1 - 3	Düzyurtspor
Elaziz Belediyespor	2 - 0	Iğdır Arasspor
12 Bingölspor	1 - 1 (6-7 p)	Dersimspor
Serhat Ardahanspor	1 - 0	Bayburt Grup İl Özel İdarespor
24 Erzincanspor	1 - 0	Muşspor
Araklı 1961 SK	0 - 1	Yomraspor
Van Büyükşehir Belediyespor	0 - 1	Kurtalanspor
Batman Petrolspor	0 - 4	Diyarbekirspor
Ankara Adliyespor	3 - 2	Erbaaspor
Nevşehirspor	2 - 0	68 Aksaray Belediyespor
Ankara Demirspor	0 - 1	Yeni Amasyaspor
Çorum Belediyespor	4 - 1	Bartınspor
Karaman Belediyespor	2 - 1	Tarsus İdman Yurdu
Kırıkhanspor	2 - 0	Kozan Belediyespor
Sarayönü Belediyespor	1 - 0	Kilis Belediyespor
Yeşil Bursa	1 - 0	Karacabey Birlikspor
Darıca Gençlerbirliği	1 - 0	Gölcükspor
Halide Edip Adıvar SK	1 - 0	Çatalcaspor
Tekirdağspor	0 - 3	Bayrampaşa
Kütahyaspor	1 - 0	Denizli Büyükşehir Belediyespor
Beylerbeyi	0 - 1 (a.e.t.)	Sancaktepe Belediyespor
Tire 1922 SK	1 - 0	Utaş Uşakspor
Manavgatspor	1 - 0	Erzin Belediyespor
Bodrumspor	0 - 0 (1-3 p)	Muğlaspor
Kızılcabölükspor	5 - 2 (a.e.t.)	Altay
Silivrispor	1 - 0	Edirnespor
Kemerspor 2003	2 - 0	Payasspor
Manisa Büyükşehir Belediyespor	3 - 2 (a.e.t.)	Bergama Belediyespor
Derincespor	1 - 2 (a.e.t.)	Sakaryaspor
Kartal	3 - 1 (a.e.t.)	Maltepespor
Afjet Afyonspor	2 - 0	Yozgatspor
Düzcespor	3 - 1 (a.e.t.)	Kocaelispor
Dardanelspor	0 - 1	Orhangazispor
Sultangazispor	1 - 1 (3-4 p)	Sultanbeyli Belediyespor

== Second round ==
- 8 teams from Super League, 18 teams from First League, 36 teams from Second League, 31 teams from Third League and 5 teams from Regional Amateur League competed in this round. Seeds were applied in this round's draw.

League	SEEDED	UNSEEDED	League
SL	Bursaspor	Konya Anadolu Selçukspor	2L
SL	Trabzonspor	Eyüpspor	2L
SL	Çaykur Rizespor	Hatayspor	2L
SL	Gaziantepspor	Fatih Karagümrük	2L
SL	Kayserispor	Kahramanmaraşspor	2L
SL	Adanaspor	Bucaspor	2L
SL	Karabükspor	Anadolu Üsküdar 1908	2L
SL	Aytemiz Alanyaspor	BB Erzurumspor	2L
1L	Medicana Sivasspor	Kastamonuspor 1966	2L
1L	Eskişehirspor	Etimesgut Belediyespor	2L
1L	Mersin İdmanyurdu	Niğde Belediyespor	2L
1L	Adana Demirspor	Zonguldak Kömürspor	2L
1L	Elazığspor	Ofspor	2L
1L	Balıkesirspor	Kartalspor	3L
1L	Giresunspor	Bayrampaşa	3L
1L	Gaziantep BBSK	Kızılcabölükspor	3L
1L	Samsunspor	Diyarbekirspor	3L
1L	Altınordu	Tire 1922	3L
1L	Yeni Malatyaspor	BB Bodrumspor	3L
1L	Boluspor	Çorum Belediyespor	3L
1L	Göztepe	Düzyurtspor	3L
1L	Şanlıurfaspor	Ankara Adliyespor	3L
1L	Denizlispor	Orhangazispor	3L
1L	Ümraniyespor	Yeşil Bursa	3L
1L	Manisaspor	Darıca Gençlerbirliği	3L
1L	Bandırmaspor	Kemerspor 2003	3L
2L	1461 Trabzon	24 Erzincanspor	3L
2L	Kayseri Erciyesspor	Sancaktepe Belediyespor	3L
2L	Karşıyaka	Dersimspor	3L
2L	İstanbulspor	Kırıkhanspor	3L
2L	Kocaeli Birlikspor	Sultanbeyli Belediyespor	3L
2L	Tuzlaspor	Sakaryaspor	3L
2L	Hacettepe Spor	Yomraspor	3L
2L	Keçiörengücü	Manavgatspor	3L
2L	Sarıyer	Düzcespor	3L
2L	Gümüşhanespor	Silivrispor	3L
2L	Menemen Belediyespor	Manisa BBSK	3L
2L	İnegölspor	Cizre Spor	3L
2L	Kırklarelispor	Kütahyaspor	3L
2L	Aydınspor 1923	Türk Metal Kırıkkale	3L
2L	Nazilli Belediyespor	Halide Edip Adıvar SK	3L
2L	Amed Sportif	Elaziz Belediyespor	3L
2L	MKE Ankaragücü	Afjet Afyonspor	3L
2L	Pendikspor	Sarayönü Bld.	3L
2L	Fethiyespor	Yeni Amasyaspor	AL
2L	Büyükçekmece Tepecikspor	Karaman Belediyespor	AL
2L	Bugsaşspor	Nevşehirspor GK	AL
2L	Sivas Belediyespor	Kurtalanspor	AL
2L	Tokatspor	Serhat Ardahan	AL

- 5 teams (63%) from Super League, 12 teams (67%) from First League, 21 teams (58%) from Second League, 10 teams (32%) from Third League and 1 team (20%) from Regional Amateur League qualified for the next round.
- 32 seeded (65%) and 17 unseeded (35%) teams qualified for the next round.
- Biggest upset was Yeni Amasyaspor (ranked 143) eliminating Kayseri Erciyesspor (ranked 38).
- Lowest ranked team qualified for the next round was Yeni Amasyaspor (ranked 143); highest ranked team got eliminated was Adanaspor (ranked 16).

HOME		AWAY
Ofspor	5 - 3	Karabükspor
Orhangazispor	2 - 3 (a.e.t.)	Kayserispor
Elazığspor	6 - 4	Sarayönü Bld.
Afjet Afyonspor	2 - 1	Karşıyaka
Aytemiz Alanyaspor	0 - 1	Sancaktepe Belediyespor
24 Erzincanspor	3 - 2	Adanaspor
Cizre Spor	0 - 2	Aydınspor 1923
Dersimspor	1 - 0	Eskişehirspor
Sivas Belediyespor	1 - 2 (a.e.t.)	Bucaspor
Hatayspor	0 - 1	Balıkesirspor
Kayseri Erciyesspor	0 - 1	Yeni Amasyaspor
Yomraspor	0 - 0 (4-1 p)	İstanbulspor
Karaman Belediyespor	2 - 3	Gümüşhanespor
Amed Sportif	2 - 0	Niğde Belediyespor
Düzyurtspor	2 - 0	1461 Trabzon
Kırıkhanspor	1 - 3 (a.e.t.)	Fethiyespor
Elaziz Belediyespor	4 - 2	Tokatspor
Keçiörengücü	2 - 0	Anadolu Üsküdar 1908
Zonguldak Kömürspor	1 - 2	Şanlıurfaspor
Manisa BBSK	2 - 4	Çaykur Rizespor
Kastamonuspor 1966	1 - 2	Tuzlaspor
Ankara Adliyespor	0 - 3	Menemen Belediyespor
Büyükçekmece Tepecikspor	2 - 2 (6-5 p)	Manavgatspor
Konya Anadolu Selçukspor	1 - 0	Altınordu
Pendikspor	3 - 2	Türk Metal Kırıkkale
Bandırmaspor	3 - 1	Yeşil Bursa
Kırklarelispor	2 - 1	Etimesgut Belediyespor
Nazilli Belediyespor	3 - 0	Kartalspor
Sarıyer	1 - 0	BB Bodrumspor
Boluspor	4 - 0	Nevşehirspor GK
Darıca Gençlerbirliği	2 - 0	MKE Ankaragücü
İnegölspor	3 - 0	Halide Edip Adıvar SK
Kahramanmaraşspor	2 - 1	Hacettepe Spor
Silivrispor	1 - 1 (2-4 p)	Ümraniyespor
Kocaeli Birlikspor	2 - 0	Sakaryaspor
Fatih Karagümrük	1 - 0	Giresunspor
Samsunspor	1 - 1 (5-4 p)	Diyarbekirspor
Yeni Malatyaspor	4 - 0	Kurtalanspor
Manisaspor	1 - 3 (a.e.t.)	Çorum Belediyespor
Trabzonspor	6 - 0	Serhat Ardahan
Adana Demirspor	1 - 3	BB Erzurumspor
Eyüpspor	0 - 2	Gaziantepspor
Bayrampaşa	0 - 1	Bursaspor
Bugsaşspor	2 - 0	Sultanbeyli Belediyespor
Kızılcabölükspor	5 - 1	Mersin İdmanyurdu
Denizlispor	2 - 1	Kemerspor 2003
Sivasspor	3 - 1	Tire 1922
Büyükşehir Gaziantepspor	0 - 0 (3-2 p)	Düzcespor
Göztepe	5 - 0	Kütahyaspor

== Third round ==
- 10 teams from Super League, 12 teams from First League, 21 teams from Second League, 10 teams from Third League and 1 team from Regional Amateur League competed in this round. Seeds were applied in this round's draw.

League	SEEDED	UNSEEDED	League
SL	Galatasaray	Menemen Belediyespor	2L
SL	Kasımpaşa	İnegölspor	2L
SL	Akhisar Belediyespor	Kırklarelispor	2L
SL	Antalyaspor	Aydınspor 1923	2L
SL	Gençlerbirliği	Nazilli Belediyespor	2L
SL	Bursaspor	Amed Sportif	2L
SL	Trabzonspor	Pendikspor	2L
SL	Çaykur Rizespor	Fethiyespor	2L
SL	Gaziantepspor	Büyükçekmece Tepecikspor	2L
SL	Kayserispor	Bugsaşspor	2L
1L	Sivasspor	Konya Anadolu Selçukspor	2L
1L	Elazığspor	Fatih Karagümrük	2L
1L	Balıkesirspor	Kahramanmaraşspor	2L
1L	Büyükşehir Gaziantepspor	Bucaspor	2L
1L	Samsunspor	BB Erzurumspor	2L
1L	Yeni Malatyaspor	Ofspor	2L
1L	Boluspor	Kızılcabölükspor	3L
1L	Göztepe	Çorum Belediyespor	3L
1L	Şanlıurfaspor	Düzyurtspor	3L
1L	Denizlispor	Darıca Gençlerbirliği	3L
1L	Ümraniyespor	24 Erzincanspor	3L
1L	Bandırmaspor	Sancaktepe Belediyespor	3L
2L	Kocaeli Birlikspor	Dersimspor	3L
2L	Tuzlaspor	Yomraspor	3L
2L	Keçiörengücü	Elaziz Belediyespor	3L
2L	Sarıyer	Afjet Afyonspor	3L
2L	Gümüşhanespor	Yeni Amasyaspor	AL

- 9 teams (90%) from Super League, 6 teams (50%) from First League, 7 teams (33%) from Second League, 4 teams (40%) from Third League and 1 team (100%) from Regional Amateur League qualified for the next round.
- 17 seeded (63%) and 10 unseeded (37%) teams qualified for the next round.
- Biggest upset was Yeni Amasyaspor (ranked 143) eliminating Denizlispor (ranked 33).
- Lowest ranked team qualified for the next round was Yeni Amasyaspor (ranked 143); highest ranked team got eliminated was Antalyaspor (ranked 9).

HOME		AWAY
Pendikspor	0 - 1	Gençlerbirliği
Amed Sportif	2 - 1	Keçiörengücü
24 Erzincanspor	2 - 1	Yeni Malatyaspor
Bandırmaspor	2 - 2 (3-4 p)	Sancaktepe Belediyespor
Kızılcabölükspor	2 - 1 (a.e.t.)	Kocaeli Birlikspor
Elazığspor	1 - 1 (4-1 p)	Ofspor
Gaziantepspor	1 - 0	Düzyurtspor
Çaykur Rizespor	3 - 0	Fethiyespor
Galatasaray	5 - 1	Dersimspor
İnegölspor	3 - 2	Sarıyer
Gümüşhanespor	2 - 1	Konya Anadolu Selçukspor
Çorum Belediyespor	1 - 2 (a.e.t.)	Trabzonspor
Büyükçekmece Tepecikspor	0 - 2	Şanlıurfaspor
Kırklarelispor	2 - 1	Büyükşehir Gaziantepspor
Afjet Afyonspor	1 - 1 (4-5 p)	Ümraniyespor
Balıkesirspor	0 - 0 (1-4 p)	Darıca Gençlerbirliği
Boluspor	1 - 0 (a.e.t.)	Elaziz Belediyespor
Samsunspor	1 - 4	Menemen Belediyespor
Sivasspor	3 - 2	Bugsaşspor
Akhisar Belediyespor	5 - 2	Nazilli Belediyespor
BB Erzurumspor	1 - 4	Tuzlaspor
Bursaspor	3 - 0	Yomraspor
Fatih Karagümrük	0 - 3	Göztepe
Yeni Amasyaspor	1 - 0	Denizlispor
Aydınspor 1923	1 - 0	Antalyaspor
Kasımpaşa	2 - 0	Kahramanmaraşspor
Kayserispor	1 - 0	Bucaspor

== Group stage ==
- 14 teams from Super League, 6 teams from First League, 7 teams from Second League, 4 teams from Third League and 1 team from Regional Amateur League competed in this round. Seeds were applied in this round's draw. The pots for the group stage draw were as follows:

League	POT 1	POT 3	League
SL	Beşiktaş	Boluspor	1L
SL	Fenerbahçe	Göztepe	1L
SL	Atiker Konyaspor	Şanlıurfaspor	1L
SL	Medipol Başakşehir	Ümraniyespor	1L
SL	Osmanlıspor FK	Tuzlaspor	2L
SL	Galatasaray	Gümüşhanespor	2L
SL	Kasımpaşa	Menemen Belediyespor	2L
SL	Akhisar Belediyespor	İnegölspor	2L
League	POT 2	POT 4	League
SL	Gençlerbirliği	Kırklarelispor	2L
SL	Bursaspor	Aydınspor 1923	2L
SL	Trabzonspor	Amed Sportif	2L
SL	Çaykur Rizespor	Kızılcabölükspor	3L
SL	Gaziantepspor	Darıca Gençlerbirliği	3L
SL	Kayserispor	24 Erzincanspor	3L
1L	Sivasspor	Sancaktepe Belediyespor	3L
1L	Elazığspor	Yeni Amasyaspor	AL

- Teams competed in a round-robin format with top two teams qualifying from each group. In case of equal points, head-to-head record was taken into account to determine the final position of teams in the group.
- 11 teams (79%) from Super League, 3 teams (50%) from First League and 2 teams (29%) from Second League qualified for the next round.
- 12 seeded (75%) and 4 unseeded (25%) teams qualified for the next round.
- 8 teams (100%) from Pot 1, 4 teams (50%) from Pot 2 and 4 teams (50%) from Pot 3 qualified for the next round.
- Lowest ranked team qualified for the next round was Gümüşhanespor (ranked 46); highest ranked team got eliminated was Bursaspor (ranked 11).

Group A
Pos	Team	Pld	W	D	L	GF	GA	GD	Pts	ŞAN	OSM	GAZ	KIR
1	Şanlıurfaspor (Q)	6	5	0	1	12	5	+7	15	—	0–3	1–0	4–1
2	Osmanlıspor FK (Q)	6	4	0	2	12	6	+6	12	1–2	—	2–1	3–0
3	Gaziantepspor	6	3	0	3	9	6	+3	9	0–3	2–0	—	2–0
4	Kırklarelispor	6	0	0	6	2	18	−16	0	0–2	1–3	0–4	—

(Q) Qualified for the round of 16

Group B
Pos	Team	Pld	W	D	L	GF	GA	GD	Pts	KAS	ÇAY	SAN	İNE
1	Kasımpaşa (Q)	6	5	0	1	18	13	+5	15	—	1–6	6–1	3–2
2	Çaykur Rizespor (Q)	6	4	1	1	18	5	+13	13	2–3	—	4–1	5–0
3	Sancaktepe Belediyespor	6	1	1	4	5	14	−9	4	1–2	0–1	—	0–0
4	İnegölspor	6	0	2	4	4	13	−9	2	1–3	0–0	1–2	—

(Q) Qualified for the round of 16

Group C
Pos	Team	Pld	W	D	L	GF	GA	GD	Pts	GEN	FEN	MEN	AME
1	Gençlerbirliği (Q)	6	4	1	1	20	6	+14	13	—	2–2	3–0	6–0
2	Fenerbahçe (Q)	6	3	2	1	14	5	+9	11	1–2	—	6–0	3–0
3	Menemen Belediyespor	6	2	1	3	7	15	−8	7	3–2	0–1	—	2–1
4	Amed Sportif	6	0	2	4	4	19	−15	2	0–5	1–1	2–2	—

(Q) Qualified for the round of 16

Group D
Pos	Team	Pld	W	D	L	GF	GA	GD	Pts	BEŞ	KAY	BOL	DAR
1	Beşiktaş (Q)	6	4	2	0	11	4	+7	14	—	2–1	2–0	3–0
2	Kayserispor (Q)	6	2	2	2	9	6	+3	8	1–1	—	3–0	3–1
3	Boluspor	6	1	3	2	5	8	−3	6	1–1	0–0	—	3–1
4	Darıca Gençlerbirliği	6	1	1	4	6	13	−7	4	1–2	2–1	1–1	—

(Q) Qualified for the round of 16

Group E
Pos	Team	Pld	W	D	L	GF	GA	GD	Pts	TUZ	GAL	24E	ELA
1	Tuzlaspor (Q)	6	4	1	1	11	5	+6	13	—	3–2	4–0	1–1
2	Galatasaray (Q)	6	3	2	1	16	9	+7	11	2–1	—	6–2	1–1
3	24 Erzincanspor	6	2	1	3	10	14	−4	7	0–1	1–1	—	3–2
4	Elazığspor	6	0	2	4	5	14	−9	2	0–1	1–4	0–4	—

(Q) Qualified for the round of 16

Group F
Pos	Team	Pld	W	D	L	GF	GA	GD	Pts	MED	SIV	GÖZ	YEN
1	Medipol Başakşehir (Q)	6	4	2	0	11	2	+9	14	—	2–0	6–2	0–0
2	Sivasspor (Q)	6	3	1	2	8	6	+2	10	0–0	—	0–1	3–1
3	Göztepe	6	2	0	4	7	13	−6	6	0–2	0–2	—	2–0
4	Yeni Amasyaspor	6	1	1	4	6	11	−5	4	0–1	2–3	3–2	—

(Q) Qualified for the round of 16

Group G
Pos	Team	Pld	W	D	L	GF	GA	GD	Pts	AKH	ÜMR	BUR	AYD
1	Akhisar Belediyespor (Q)	6	3	2	1	12	8	+4	11	—	0–1	3–3	1–0
2	Ümraniyespor (Q)	6	3	0	3	6	7	−1	9	1–2	—	0–1	3–1
3	Bursaspor	6	2	2	2	9	9	0	8	1–4	3–0	—	1–1
4	Aydınspor 1923	6	1	2	3	5	8	−3	5	2–2	0–1	1–0	—

(Q) Qualified for the round of 16

Group H
Pos	Team	Pld	W	D	L	GF	GA	GD	Pts	ATI	GÜM	TRA	KIZ
1	Atiker Konyaspor (Q)	6	3	2	1	9	2	+7	11	—	3–0	0–0	1–0
2	Gümüşhanespor (Q)	6	2	3	1	5	6	−1	9 (Note: Head-to-head: Trabzonspor (Pts: 1, GF: 1, GA: 2, GD: -1); Gümüşhanespor (Pts: 4, GF: 2, GA: 1, GD: 1))	1–1	—	0–0	1–0
3	Trabzonspor	6	2	3	1	8	3	+5	9	1–0	1–2	—	5–0
4	Kızılcabölükspor	6	0	2	4	2	13	−11	2	0–4	1–1	1–1	—

(Q) Qualified for the round of 16

== Round of 16 ==
- 11 teams from Super League, 3 teams from First League and 2 teams from Second League competed in this round.
- 7 teams (64%) from Super League and 1 team (33%) from First League qualified for the next round.
- 5 seeded (63%) and 3 unseeded (38%) teams qualified for the next round.
- Biggest upset was Kayserispor (ranked 15) eliminating Gençlerbirliği (ranked 10).
- Lowest ranked team qualified for the next round was Sivasspor (ranked 19); highest ranked team got eliminated was Beşiktaş (ranked 1).

=== Summary table ===
Team 1	Score	Team 2
Tuzlaspor	1–4	Sivasspor
Gençlerbirliği	2–3	Kayserispor
Şanlıurfaspor	1–2 (a.e.t.)	Çaykur Rizespor
Medipol Başakşehir	2–1	Galatasaray
Akhisar Belediyespor	3–1	Gümüşhanespor
Atiker Konyaspor	2–1 (a.e.t.)	Ümraniyespor
Kasımpaşa	1–0 (a.e.t.)	Osmanlıspor
Beşiktaş	0–1	Fenerbahçe

=== Matches ===
4 February 2017	Tuzlaspor	1–4	Sivasspor	Istanbul
14:00	Papaker 70'	Report	Arslan 13'; Koçak 33'; Keleş 56', 57'	Stadium: Tuzla Belediyesi; Referee: Kutluhan Bilgiç

4 February 2017	Gençlerbirliği	2–3	Kayserispor	Ankara
16:15	Gürler 68'; Velikonja 86'	Report	Welliton 34', 44'; Çiftçi 76' (o.g.)	Stadium: Ankara 19 Mayıs; Referee: Bülent Yıldırım

4 February 2017	Şanlıurfaspor	1–2 (a.e.t.)	Çaykur Rizespor	Şanlıurfa
18:30	Cavlan 83'	Report	Yıldırım 73' (o.g.); Çağlayan 117' (pen.)	Stadium: Şanlıurfa GAP; Referee: Alper Ulusoy

4 February 2017	Medipol Başakşehir	2–1	Galatasaray	Istanbul
20:30	Pektemek 15', 27'	Report	Derdiyok 90+2'	Stadium: Başakşehir Fatih Terim; Referee: Mete Kalkavan

5 February 2017	Akhisar Belediyespor	3–1	Gümüşhanespor	Manisa
12:30	Vaz Tê 10'; Samardžić 50'; Çelik 87'	Report	Özgün 86' (pen.)	Stadium: Manisa 19 Mayıs; Referee: Özgür Yankaya

5 February 2017	Atiker Konyaspor	2–1 (a.e.t.)	Ümraniyespor	Konya
15:30	Rangelov 84'; Vuković 99' (pen.)	Report	Özbayraktar 48'	Stadium: Konya Büyükşehir; Referee: Arda Kardeşler

5 February 2017	Kasımpaşa	1–0 (a.e.t.)	Osmanlıspor	Istanbul
16:15	Şahin 112'	Report		Stadium: Recep Tayyip Erdoğan; Referee: Ümit Öztürk

5 February 2017	Beşiktaş	0–1	Fenerbahçe	Istanbul
20:30		Report	Van Persie 72'	Stadium: Vodafone Arena; Referee: Ali Palabıyık

== Quarter-finals ==
- 7 teams from Super League and 1 team from First League competed in this round. Seeds were applied in this round's draw.

=== Summary table ===
Team 1	Agg.	Team 2	1st leg	2nd leg
Kasımpaşa	4–2	Çaykur Rizespor	2–0	2–2
Sivasspor	2–3	Atiker Konyaspor	0–0	2–3
Medipol Başakşehir	3–1	Akhisar Belediyespor	1–1	2–0
Kayserispor	0–6	Fenerbahçe	0–3	0–3

=== First leg ===
28 February 2017	Kasımpaşa	2–0	Çaykur Rizespor	Istanbul
20:00	Popov 63'; Koita 90'	Report		Stadium: Recep Tayyip Erdoğan; Referee: Alper Ulusoy

1 March 2017	Sivasspor	0–0	Atiker Konyaspor	Sivas
18:00		Report		Stadium: Sivas Arena; Referee: Hüseyin Göçek

1 March 2017	Medipol Başakşehir	1–1	Akhisar Belediyespor	Istanbul
20:00	Napoleoni 25'	Report	Vaz Te 78'	Stadium: Başakşehir Fatih Terim; Referee: Ali Palabıyık

2 March 2017	Kayserispor	0–3	Fenerbahçe	Kayseri
20:30		Report	Fernandão 45', 71'; Kaş 76' (o.g.)	Stadium: Kadir Has; Referee: Ümit Öztürk

=== Second leg ===
4 April 2017	Akhisar Belediyespor	0–2	Medipol Başakşehir	Manisa
20:00		Report	Adebayor 24'; Batdal 90'	Stadium: Manisa 19 Mayıs; Referee: Ümit Öztürk

5 April 2017	Çaykur Rizespor	2–2	Kasımpaşa	Rize
18:00	Yacoubi 9'; Kweuke 47'	Report	Büyük 38', 90'	Stadium: Yeni Rize Şehir; Referee: Özgür Yankaya

5 April 2017	Fenerbahçe	3–0	Kayserispor	Istanbul
20:30	Chahechouhe 31'; Souza 35'; Şen 83'	Report		Stadium: Şükrü Saracoğlu; Referee: Arda Kardeşler

6 April 2017	Atiker Konyaspor	3–2	Sivasspor	Konya
20:00	Rangelov 35' (pen.); Fofana 43', 78'	Report	Keleş 36'; Kılınç 58'	Stadium: Konya Büyükşehir; Referee: Alper Ulusoy

== Semi-finals ==
=== Summary table ===
Team 1	Agg.	Team 2	1st leg	2nd leg
İstanbul Başakşehir	4–4 (10–9 p)	Fenerbahçe	2–2	2–2 (a.e.t.)
Kasımpaşa	3–4	Konyaspor	3–2	0–2

=== First leg ===
26 April 2017	İstanbul Başakşehir	2–2	Fenerbahçe	Istanbul
20:45	Ünder 7', 11'	Report	Tufan 12' van Persie 61'	Stadium: Başakşehir Fatih Terim; Referee: Mete Kalkavan

27 April 2017	Kasımpaşa	3–2	Konyaspor	Istanbul
20:45	Pavelka 82'; Büyük 85'; Eduok 86'	Report	Hadžiahmetović 17'; Bajić 45'	Stadium: Recep Tayyip Erdoğan; Referee: Ümit Öztürk

=== Second leg ===
16 May 2017	Konyaspor	2–0	Kasımpaşa	Konya
20:45	Bajić 18' (pen.), 57'	Report		Stadium: Konya Büyükşehir; Referee: Ali Palabıyık

17 May 2017	Fenerbahçe	2–2 (a.e.t.) (9–10 p)	İstanbul Başakşehir	Istanbul
20:45	Sow 71'; Tufan 87'	Report	Belözoğlu 43'; Holmén 86'	Stadium: Şükrü Saracoğlu
	Penalties
	Sow (penalty scored); Kjær (penalty scored); Souza (penalty scored); Topal (penalty missed); Lens (penalty scored); Şen (penalty scored); Neustädter (penalty scored); Škrtel (penalty missed); Kaldırım (penalty scored); Demirel (penalty missed); Sow (penalty scored); Kjær (penalty scored); Souza (penalty missed)		(penalty scored) Belözoğlu; (penalty missed) Višća; (penalty scored) Pektemek; (penalty scored) Epureanu; (penalty scored) Adebayor; (penalty scored) Ünder; (penalty scored) Holmén; (penalty missed) Napoleoni; (penalty scored) Attamah; (penalty missed) Babacan; (penalty scored) Belözoğlu; (penalty scored) Holmén; (penalty scored) Adebayor

== Final ==
The final contested in Eslkişehir as a one-off match. The winner awarded 50 medals per club along with the Turkish Cup trophy.

31 May 2017	İstanbul Başakşehir	0–0 (a.e.t.) (1–4 p)	Konyaspor	Eskişehir
21:30 TRT (UTC+03:00)		Report		Stadium: New Eskişehir Stadium; Referee: Fırat Aydınus
	Penalties
	Belözoğlu (penalty scored); Epureanu (penalty missed); Ünder (penalty missed)		(penalty scored) Hora; (penalty scored) Bajić; (penalty scored) Vuković; (penalty scored) Skubic
