= 2010–11 Bursaspor season =

Bursaspor
2010–11 season
- Chairman: İbrahim Yazıcı
- Manager: Ertuğrul Sağlam
- Stadium: Bursa Atatürk Stadium
- Süper Lig: 3^{rd}
- Turkish Cup: Group Stage
- UEFA Champions League: Group Stage
- Top goalscorer: Turgay Bahadır (7)
| Home colours | Away colours | Third colours |

The 2010–11 season will be the 47th season in Bursaspor's existence, and their fourth consecutive year in the top-flight of Turkish football, and will cover the period from 1 July 2010 to 30 June 2011. The club qualified for the UEFA Champions League after being crowned champions in the 2009–10 domestic season. They will enter at the group stage. Their previous encounters in Europe have come in the 1986–87 European Cup Winners' Cup and the 1995 UEFA Intertoto Cup, where they went out in the quarter-finals.

== Team kit ==
The team kit for the 2010–11 season is produced by Puma and the shirt sponsor is Digiturk. The home kit will be in the traditional green colour and the away kit will be all white.

== Pre-season ==
Bursaspor began their pre-season training on 28 July 2010 at their training camp in Bad Tatzmannsdorf, Austria. Bursaspor's training schedule consisted of preseason friendly matches against games against Iranian club Steel Azin on 13 July in Oberschützen, a 1-0 win against Stoke City on 15 July in Irdning, a 2–2 draw against Red Star Belgrade on 18 July in Gleisdorf and a 1–1 draw against Borussia Dortmund in Rudersdorf on 21 July.

== Current squad ==
As of 21 January 2011

Note: Flags indicate national team as defined under FIFA eligibility rules; some limited exceptions apply. Players may hold more than one non-FIFA nationality.

| No. | Pos. | Nation | Player |
|---|---|---|---|
| 1 | GK | TUR | Yavuz Özkan |
| 2 | DF | TUR | Serdar Aziz |
| 3 | DF | BRA | Gökçek Vederson |
| 4 | DF | TUR | Ömer Erdoğan (captain) |
| 5 | MF | TUR | Hüseyin Çimşir |
| 6 | MF | TUR | Bekir Ozan Has |
| 7 | MF | ARG | Federico Insúa |
| 8 | MF | TUR | Eren Albayrak |
| 9 | FW | TUR | Sercan Yıldırım |
| 10 | MF | TUR | Volkan Şen |
| 11 | MF | ROU | Giani Kiriță |
| 12 | FW | USA | Jozy Altidore |
| 13 | MF | SWE | Gustav Svensson |
| 17 | MF | ARG | Pablo Batalla |

| No. | Pos. | Nation | Player |
|---|---|---|---|
| 18 | FW | SCO | Kenny Miller |
| 20 | MF | TUR | Ozan İpek |
| 21 | MF | TUR | Ali Tandoğan |
| 22 | MF | TUR | Turgay Bahadır |
| 23 | DF | TUR | Mustafa Keçeli |
| 25 | MF | SRB | Ivan Ergić |
| 27 | GK | BUL | Dimitar Ivankov |
| 35 | MF | TUR | İsmail Haktan Odabaşı |
| 38 | DF | TUR | İbrahim Öztürk |
| 55 | DF | SRB | Milan Stepanov |
| 72 | MF | TUR | Ahmet Arı |
| 89 | GK | TUR | Harun Tekin |
| 90 | MF | TUR | Mehmet Sak |

== Transfers ==
=== In ===
==== Summer ====
| Num | Pos | Player | From | Fee | Date |
|---|---|---|---|---|---|
| 3 | DF | (Brazil) Gökçek Vederson | Fenerbahçe | Free | 1 June 2010 |
| 89 | GK | (Turkey) Harun Tekin | Güngören Belediyespor | Undisclosed | 4 June 2010 |
| 7 | MF | (Argentina) Federico Insúa | Boca Juniors on loan from América | Undisclosed | 16 June 2010 |
| 19 | MF | (Argentina) Damián Steinert | Racing Club | Free | 2 July 2010 |
| 44 | DF | (Turkey) Anıl Sarak | Youth Academy | Free | 2 July 2010 |
| 93 | MF | (Turkey) Emre Pehlivan | Youth Academy | Free | 8 July 2010 |
| 29 | FW | (Argentina) Leonel Núñez | Independiente | ? | 29 July 2010 |
| 55 | DF | (Serbia) Milan Stepanov | Porto | ? | 1 August 2010 |
| 13 | MF | (Sweden) Gustav Svensson | IFK Göteborg | ? | 1 September 2010 |

==== Winter ====
| Num | Pos | Player | From | Fee | Date |
|---|---|---|---|---|---|
| 18 | FW | (Scotland) Kenny Miller | Rangers | £400,000 | 21 January 2011 |
| ?? | MF | (Turkey) Ahmet Arı | Gaziantepspor | ? | 31 January 2011 |

==== Loan ====
| Num | Pos | Player | From | Start | End |
|---|---|---|---|---|---|
| 12 | FW | (United States) Jozy Altidore | Villarreal | 31 January 2011 | 31 July 2011 |

=== Out ===
==== Summer ====
| Num | Pos | Player | To | Fee | Date |
|---|---|---|---|---|---|
| 26 | DF | (Czech Republic) Tomáš Zápotočný | Beşiktaş | Loan expired | 31 May 2010 |
| 35 | DF | (Turkey) Tuna Üzümcü | Antalyaspor | Free | 21 June 2010 |
| 20 | MF | (Turkey) Veli Acar | Konyaspor | Undisclosed | 2 July 2010 |
| 28 | FW | (Argentina) Leonardo Andrés Iglesias | Unattached | Free | 2 July 2010 |
| 19 | FW | (Turkey) Isa Bagci | ? | ? | ? 2010 |
| 32 | DF | (Turkey) Yenal Tuncer | ? | ? | ? 2010 |
| 42 | FW | (Turkey) Halil Zeybek | ? | ? | ? 2010 |
| 90 | GK | (Turkey) Ceyhun Demircan | ? | ? | ? 2010 |
| 99 | MF | (Turkey) Emre Pehlivan | ? | ? | ? 2010 |

==== Winter ====
| Num | Pos | Player | To | Fee | Date |
|---|---|---|---|---|---|
| 67 | FW (Academy) | (Turkey) Muhammet Demir | Gaziantepspor | Exchange | 31 January 2010 |

==== Loan ====
| Num | Pos | Player | From | Start | End |
|---|---|---|---|---|---|
| 32 | DF | (Turkey) Yenal Tuncer | Antalyaspor | 25 June 2010 | ? |

== Statistics ==
=== Goal scorers ===
Includes all competitive matches. The list is sorted by shirt number when total goals are equal.

Last updated on 14 September

| Position | Nation | Number | Name | Süper Lig | Turkish Cup | Champions League | Super Cup | Total |
|---|---|---|---|---|---|---|---|---|
| 1 | (Turkey) | 22 | Turgay Bahadır | 7 | . | . | . | 7 |
| 2 | (Turkey) | 9 | Sercan Yıldırım | 5 | . | 1 | . | 6 |
| =2 | (Serbia) | 25 | Ivan Ergić | 5 | 1 | . | . | 6 |
| 3 | (Argentina) | 29 | Leonel Núñez | 2 | 1 | . | . | 3 |
| 4 | (Argentina) | 17 | Pablo Batalla | 1 | . | 1 | . | 2 |
| =4 | (Scotland) | 18 | Kenny Miller | 2 | . | . | . | 2 |
| =4 | (Turkey) | 20 | Ozan Ipek | 2 | . | . | . | 2 |
| =4 | (Turkey) | 21 | Ali Tandoğan | 2 | . | . | . | 2 |
| 5 | (Turkey) | 2 | Ömer Erdoğan | 1 | . | . | . | 1 |
| =5 | (Turkey) | 3 | Gökçek Vederson | 1 | . | . | . | 1 |
| =5 | (Turkey) | 5 | Hüseyin Çimşir | 1 | . | . | . | 1 |
| =5 | (Argentina) | 7 | Federico Insúa | 1 | . | . | . | 1 |
| =5 | (Turkey) | 10 | Volkan Şen | 1 | . | . | . | 1 |
| =5 | (Romania) | 11 | Giani Kiriță | . | 1 | . | . | 1 |
| =5 | (Turkey) | 38 | İbrahim Öztürk | 1 | . | . | . | 1 |
| =5 | (Serbia) | 55 | Milan Stepanov | . | 1 | . | . | 1 |
| / | / | / | Own Goals | 2 | . | . | . | 2 |
| / | / | / | Default goals | 3 | . | . | . | 3 |
| | | | TOTALS | 37 | 4 | 2 | 0 | 43 |

== Records ==
=== Doubles achieved ===
| Opponent | Home result | Away result |
|---|---|---|
| Galatasaray | 2–0 | 2-0 |
| Sivasspor | 2–1 | 2-0 |

=== Biggest winning margin ===
| # | Opponent | H/A | Result | Competition |
|---|---|---|---|---|
| 1 | Ankaragücü | A | 1-5 | League |
| =1 | Gençlerbirliği | A | 1-5 | League |

== Current staff ==
| Position | Role |
|---|---|
| Manager | (Turkey) Ertuğrul Sağlam |
| Assistant manager | (Turkey) Mutlu Topçu |
| Coach | (Turkey) Ersel Uzgur |
| Coach | (Turkey) Birol Berkem |
| Coach | (Turkey) İbrahim Bakır |
| Goalkeeping coach | (Turkey) Öztürk Tanrıbilir |

== Classification ==
Bursaspor's fourth consecutive season in the Süper Lig began on 15 August 2010 and is due to end on 9 May 2011.

=== League table ===
| Pos | Team | Pld | W | D | L | GF | GA | GD | Pts | Qualification or relegation |
|---|---|---|---|---|---|---|---|---|---|---|
| 1 | Fenerbahçe (C) | 34 | 26 | 4 | 4 | 84 | 34 | +50 | 82 | |
| 2 | Trabzonspor | 34 | 25 | 7 | 2 | 69 | 23 | +46 | 82 | Qualification to Champions League group stage (Note: Originally, Fenerbahçe qualified for the group stage and Trabzonspor qualified for the third qualifying round. Despite being eliminated in the third qualifying round and passed to the UEFA Europa League play-off round, Trabzonspor replaced Fenerbahçe after the Turkish Football Federation withdrew Fenerbahçe from the UEFA Champions League one day before the group stage draw due to match-fixing allegations. UEFA would then select Trabzonspor as their replacement.) |
| 3 | Bursaspor | 34 | 17 | 10 | 7 | 50 | 29 | +21 | 61 | Qualification to Europa League third qualifying round |
| 4 | Gaziantepspor | 34 | 17 | 8 | 9 | 44 | 33 | +11 | 59 | Qualification to Europa League second qualifying round |
| 5 | Beşiktaş | 34 | 15 | 9 | 10 | 53 | 36 | +17 | 54 | Qualification to Europa League play-off round (Note: Beşiktaş have won the 2010–11 Turkish Cup competition and thus are qualified for the play-off round of the UEFA Europa League.) |

Source: tff.org (in Turkish)
Rules for classification: 1) points; 2) goal difference; 3) number of goals scored.
(C) Champions

=== League results summary ===
| Overall | | | | | | | | Home | | | | | | Away | | | | | |
| Pld | W | D | L | GF | GA | GD | Pts | W | D | L | GF | GA | GD | W | D | L | GF | GA | GD |
|---|---|---|---|---|---|---|---|---|---|---|---|---|---|---|---|---|---|---|---|
| 34 | 17 | 10 | 7 | 50 | 29 | +21 | 61 | 9 | 4 | 4 | 22 | 20 | +2 | 8 | 6 | 3 | 28 | 9 | +19 |

Last updated: 13 April 2011.
Source: 2010–11 Süper Lig

=== Results by round ===
| Round | 1 | 2 | 3 | 4 | 5 | 6 | 7 | 8 | 9 | 10 | 11 | 12 | 13 | 14 | 15 | 16 | 17 | 18 | 19 | 20 | 21 | 22 | 23 | 24 | 25 | 26 | 27 | 28 | 29 | 30 | 31 | 32 | 33 | 34 |
|---|---|---|---|---|---|---|---|---|---|---|---|---|---|---|---|---|---|---|---|---|---|---|---|---|---|---|---|---|---|---|---|---|---|---|
| Ground | H | A | A | H | A | H | A | H | A | H | A | H | A | H | A | H | A | A | H | H | A | H | A | H | A | H | A | H | A | H | A | H | A | H |
| Result | W | W | W | W | W | W | D | D | W | D | D | L | W | W | L | W | W | D | W | W | D | L | W | D | D | D | D | L | L | W | L | L | W | W |
| Position | 6 | 2 | 1 | 1 | 1 | 1 | 1 | 1 | 1 | 1 | 2 | 3 | 2 | 2 | 2 | 2 | 2 | 2 | 2 | 2 | 3 | 3 | 3 | 3 | 3 | 3 | 3 | 3 | 3 | 3 | 3 | 3 | 3 | 3 |

Updated to match(es) played on 13 April 2011. Source: soccernet.espn.go.com
A = Away; H = Home; W = Win; D = Draw; L = Loss

=== Matches ===
| 16 August 2010; 19:00 BST | Bursaspor | 1–0 | Konyaspor | Bursa Atatürk Stadium, Bursa |
| | Yıldırım 41'; Çimşir (yellow card) 63'; Erdoğan (yellow card) 89' | (Report) (Match Stats) | | Referee: Süleyman Abay |

| 22 August 2010; 19:00 BST | Galatasaray | 0–2 | Bursaspor | Ali Sami Yen Stadium, Istanbul |
| | Akman (yellow card) 45+1'; Baroš (yellow card) 45+2'; Elano (yellow card) 75'; Kewell (yellow card) 76' | (Report) (Match Stats) | Ergić 15', 83'; Şen (yellow card) 19'; Çimşir (yellow card) 68'; Ivankov (yellow card) 84' | Referee: Abdullah Yılmaz |

| 28 August 2010; 19:00 BST | Sivasspor | 0–2 | Bursaspor | Sivas 4 Eylül, Sivas |
| | Zita (yellow card) 39'; Yılmaz (yellow card) 56'; Bayrak (yellow card) 87' | (Report) (Match Stats) | Şen 81'; İpek (yellow card) 82'; Yıldırım (yellow card) 86'; Tandoğan 90+3' | Referee: Cüneyt Çakır |

| 10 September 2010; 18:00 BST | Bursaspor | 2–1 | Eskişehirspor | Bursa Atatürk Stadium, Bursa |
| | Núñez 70'; Gökçek Vederson (yellow card) 74'; Yıldırım 77' | (Report) (Match Stats) | Coşkun (yellow card) 2'; Öztürk 18'; Eşer (yellow card) 53'; Potuk (yellow card) 57'; Erdoğan (yellow card) 72' | Referee: Fırat Aydınus |

| 20 September 2010 | Gaziantepspor | SUSP^{1} 0–3 (default) | Bursaspor | Gaziantep Kamil Ocak Stadium, Gaziantep |
| 18:00 BST | | (Report) (Match Stats) | | Referee: Deniz Çoban |

| 24 September 2010; 18:00 BST | Bursaspor | 1–0 | Bucaspor | Bursa Atatürk Stadium, Bursa |
| | Çimşir 4', (yellow card) 38'; Bahadır (yellow card) 61'; İpek (yellow card) 90' | (Report) (Match Stats) | Dağaşan (yellow card) 17'; Leko (yellow card) 52'; Carlos (yellow card) 90' | Referee: Hüseyin Göçek |

| 3 October 2010; 13:30 BST | İstanbul B.B. | 0–0 | Bursaspor | Ali Sami Yen, Istanbul |
| | Çimşir (yellow card) 15'; Şen (yellow card) 15'; Gökçek Vederson (yellow card) 78' | (Report) (Match Stats) | Süzen (yellow card) 15'; Holmén (yellow card) 38'; Kuś (yellow card) 79' | Referee: Mustafa Kamil AbitoĞlu |

| 15 October 2010; 18:00 BST | Bursaspor | 2–2 | Karabükspor | Bursa Atatürk Stadium, Bursa |
| | Bahadır 10', 24'; Svensson (yellow card) 75' | (Report) (Match Stats) | Cernat 13', 33'; Söyler (yellow card) 43'; Özdin (yellow card) 77'; Hikmet (yellow card) 82'; Tomić (yellow card) 85' | Referee: Bünyamin Gezer |

| 24 October 2010; 12:30 BST | Ankaragücü | 1–5 | Bursaspor | Ankara 19 Mayıs Stadium, Ankara |
| | Šesták 6', (yellow card) 81' | (Report) (Match Stats) | Öztürk 16'; Bahadır 27'; Erdoğan 31'; Batalla (yellow card) 38'; Ergić 39'; Şen (yellow card) 44'; Yıldırım 45'; Keçeli (yellow card) 45' | Referee: Hüseyin Göçek |

| 29 October 2010; 18:00 GMT | Bursaspor | 1–1 | Fenerbahçe | Bursa Atatürk Stadium, Bursa |
| | Bahadır (yellow card) 24'; Ergić 51'; Yıldırım (yellow card) 58'; Tandoğan (yellow card) 69' | (Report) (Match Stats) | Şentürk 16'; Topuz (yellow card) 44'; Bilica (yellow card) 58'; Alex (yellow card) 82'; Erkin (yellow card) 89' | Referee: Cüneyt Çakır |

| 6 November 2010; GMT | Antalyaspor | 2–2 | Bursaspor | Mardan Sports Complex, Antalya |
| | Nizam (yellow card) 20'; Inceman 23'; Tita (yellow card) 25'; Şeras 44', (yellow card) 78' | (Report) (Match Stats) | Tandoğan (yellow card) 34', (goal) 51'; İpek 74'; Kiriță (red card) 86'; Núñez (yellow card) 90' | Referee: Süleyman Abay |

| 13 November 2010; 14:00 GMT | Bursaspor | 0–2 | Trabzonspor | Bursa Atatürk Stadium, Bursa |
| | Şen (yellow card) 87'; Ivankov (yellow card) 90+1' | (Report) (Match Stats) | Jajá 5', 16'; Čale (yellow card) 40'; Yılmaz (yellow card) 46'; Gülselam (yellow card) 61' | Referee: Bülent Yıldırım |

| 20 November 2010; 14:00 GMT | Manisaspor | 0–2 | Bursaspor | Manisa 19 Mayis Stadi, Manisa |
| | Dixon (yellow card) 28' | (Report) (Match Stats) | Bahadır 41'; Batalla 44' | Referee: Kuddusi MüftüoĞlu |

| 29 November 2010; 18:00 GMT | Bursaspor | 2–0 | Kayserispor | Bursa Atatürk Stadium, Bursa |
| | Insúa 83', (yellow card) 83'; Yıldırım 85', (yellow card) 85'; İpek (yellow card) 87' | (Report) (Match Stats) | Kesimal (yellow card) 36'; Durak (yellow card) 67'; Yılmaz (yellow card) 89' | Referee: MUSTAFA KAMİL ABİTOĞLU |

| 5 December 2010; 12:00 GMT | Beşiktaş | 1–0 | Bursaspor | BJK İnönü Stadium |
| | Hološko (yellow card) 40', (goal) 65'; Gülüm (yellow card) 83' | (Report) (Match Stats) | Ivankov (yellow card) 40'; Şen (red card) 45'; Keçeli (yellow card) 85' | Referee: Fırat Aydınus |

| 13 December 2010; 18:00 GMT | Bursaspor | 2–1 | Kasımpaşa | Recep Tayyip Erdoğan Stadium |
| | Bahadır 21'; İpek (yellow card) 58'; Erdoğan (yellow card) 63'; Özgen , 86' (o.g.) | (Report) (Match Stats) | Kurtuluş 14'; Sarmov (yellow card) 38'; Varela (yellow card) 89' | Referee: Halis Özkahya |

| 18 December 2010; 14:00 GMT | Gençlerbirliği | 1–5 | Bursaspor | 19 Mayıs Stadyumu |
| | Aydoğdu 26'; Tambwe (yellow card) 69' | (Report) (Match Stats) | Yıldırım 17', 44'; İpek 28'; Bahadır 52'; Has (yellow card) 84'; Núñez 88' | Referee: Cüneyt Çakır |

| 23 January 2011; 14:00 GMT | Konyaspor | 0–0 | Bursaspor | Konya Atatürk Stadium, Konya |
| | Arslan (yellow card) 56'; Grajciar (yellow card) 79'; Dere (yellow card) 83' | (Report) (Match Stats) | Bahadır (yellow card) 37'; Aziz (yellow card) 62' | Referee: Hüseyin Göçek |

| 29 January 2011; 17:00 GMT | Bursaspor | 2–0 | Galatasaray | Bursa Atatürk Stadium, Bursa |
| | Miller 36'; Stepanov (yellow card) 44'; Gökçek Vederson 45+1'; Erdoğan (yellow card) 75' | (Report) (Match Stats) | Sarıoğlu (yellow card) 37'; Çetin (yellow card) 62'; Culio (yellow card) 63'; Akman (red card) 64'; Kazim-Richards (yellow card) 85' | Referee: Bülent Yıldırım |

| 4 February 2011; 18:00 GMT | Bursaspor | 2–1 | Sivasspor | Bursa Atatürk Stadium, Bursa |
| | Yerlikaya , 44' (o.g.); Gökçek Vederson (yellow card) 52'; Miller 88' | (Report) (Match Stats) | Grosicki 50'; Rada (yellow card) 60'; Kavuk (yellow card) 74'; Navratil (yellow card) 77'; Celikay (yellow card) 83'; Yıldız (yellow card) 89' | Referee: Fırat Aydınus |

| 13 February 2011; 14:00 GMT | Eskişehirspor | 1–1 | Bursaspor | Atatürk Stadium, Eskişehir |
| | Eşer (yellow card) 44'; Karadeniz (red card) 68'; Öztürk 75' (pen.) | (Report) (Match Stats) | Ergić 22', (yellow card) 72'; Tandoğan (yellow card) 33'; Miller (yellow card) 75'; İpek (red card) 78'; Stepanov (yellow card) 89' | Referee: Halis Özkahya |

| 19 February 2011 | Bursaspor | 1–4 | Gaziantepspor | Bursa Atatürk Stadium, Bursa |
| 14:00 GMT | | (Report) (Match Stats) | | Referee: Hüseyin Göçek |

== Turkish Cup ==
Bursaspor finished third in their Group D of the Turkish Cup, winning and drawing one game and losing two games. They did not qualify for the knockout rounds.

| Pos | Team | Pld | W | D | L | GF | GA | GD | Pts |
|---|---|---|---|---|---|---|---|---|---|
| 1 | Kasımpaşa | 4 | 4 | 0 | 0 | 9 | 2 | +7 | 12 |
| 2 | İstanbul B.B. | 4 | 3 | 0 | 1 | 4 | 3 | +1 | 9 |
| 3 | Bursaspor | 4 | 1 | 1 | 2 | 4 | 5 | −1 | 4 |
| 4 | Karşıyaka | 4 | 1 | 0 | 3 | 5 | 6 | −1 | 3 |
| 5 | Kırıkhanspor | 4 | 0 | 1 | 3 | 3 | 9 | −6 | 1 |

Source: tff.org (in Turkish)
Rules for classification: 1) points; 2) goal difference; 3) number of goals scored.

=== Cup matches ===
10 November 2010
17:00 BST

| Bursaspor | 1–1 | Kırıkhanspor |
|---|---|---|
| Núñez 27'; Has (yellow card) 33' | (Match Stats) | Akan Karasu 24'; Oğuzhan Afşin (yellow card) 66'; Bekir Küçükertaş (yellow card) 84' |

Bursa Atatürk Stadium, Bursa
Referee: Hakan Ceylan

21 December 2010
18:00 BST

| Karşıyaka | 0–2 | Bursaspor |
|---|---|---|
| Karakaş (yellow card) 62'; Erdi Kasapoğlu (yellow card) 73' | (Match Stats) | Has (yellow card) 19'; Ergić 45'; Stepanov 55' |

İzmir Atatürk Stadium, İzmir
Referee: BARIŞ ŞİMŞEK

15 January 2011
18:00 BST

| Kasımpaşa | 3–1 | Bursaspor |
|---|---|---|
| Çolak 20'; Martin 53'; Robledo 60'; Güleç (yellow card) 65'; Öztürk (yellow card) 84' | (Match Stats) | Kiriță 2', (yellow card) 73'; Steinert (yellow card) 86' |

Recep Tayyip Erdoğan Stadium, Istanbul
Referee: KUDDUSİ MÜFTÜOĞLU

15 January 2011
18:00 BST

| Bursaspor | 0–1 | İstanbul BB |
|---|---|---|
| Gökçek Vederson (yellow card) 69' | (Match Stats) | Holmén 82', (yellow card) 75'; Hasagić (yellow card) 89'; Akyüz (yellow card) 27' |

Bursa Atatürk Stadium, Bursa
Referee: KUDDUSİ MÜFTÜOĞLU

== UEFA Champions League ==
By virtue of winning the 2009–10 Süper Lig, Bursaspor have automatically qualified for the group stage of the tournament. The draw for the group stage was held on the 26 August 2010 in Monaco; Bursaspor have been drawn in Group C alongside Manchester United, Valencia and Rangers.

=== Results by round ===
| Round | 1 | 2 | 3 | 4 | 5 | 6 |
|---|---|---|---|---|---|---|
| Ground | H | A | A | H | A | H |
| Result | L | L | L | L | L | D |
| Position | 4 | 4 | 4 | 4 | 4 | 4 |

Updated to match(es) played on 25 November. Source: UEFA Champions League
A = Away; H = Home; W = Win; D = Draw; L = Loss

=== Group C ===
| Pos | Team | Pld | W | D | L | GF | GA | GD | Pts | Qualification |
|---|---|---|---|---|---|---|---|---|---|---|
| 1 | (England) Manchester United | 6 | 4 | 2 | 0 | 7 | 1 | +6 | 14 | Advance to knockout phase |
| 2 | (Spain) Valencia | 6 | 3 | 2 | 1 | 15 | 4 | +11 | 11 | Advance to knockout phase |
| 3 | (Scotland) Rangers | 6 | 1 | 3 | 2 | 3 | 6 | −3 | 6 | Transfer to Europa League |
| 4 | (Turkey) Bursaspor | 6 | 0 | 1 | 5 | 2 | 16 | −14 | 1 | |

Source: Soccerway
14 September 2010
19:45 BST

| Bursaspor (Turkey) | 0–4 | (Spain) Valencia |
|---|---|---|
| | Report | T. Costa 16'; Aduriz 41'; Hernández 68'; Soldado 76' |

Bursa Atatürk Stadium, Bursa, Turkey
Attendance: 25,000
Referee: Svein Oddvar Moen (Norway)

29 September 2010
19:45 BST

| Rangers (Scotland) | 1–0 | (Turkey) Bursaspor |
|---|---|---|
| Naismith 17'; Papac (yellow card) 80' | Report | Erdoğan (yellow card) 42'; Stepanov (yellow card) 85'; Tandoğan (yellow card) 88' |

Ibrox Stadium, Glasgow, Scotland
Attendance: 41,905
Referee: Serge Gumienny (Belgium)

20 October 2010
19:45 BST

| Manchester United (England) | 1–0 | (Turkey) Bursaspor |
|---|---|---|
| Nani 7', (yellow card) 40' | Report | İpek (yellow card) 40'; Tandoğan (yellow card) 63' |

Old Trafford, Manchester, England
Attendance: 72,610
Referee: Gianluca Rocchi (Italy)

2 November 2010
19:45 GMT

| Bursaspor (Turkey) | 0–3 | (England) Manchester United |
|---|---|---|
| | Report | Fletcher 48'; Obertan 73'; Bébé 77' |

Bursa Atatürk Stadium, Bursa, Turkey
Attendance: 19,050
Referee: Wolfgang Stark (Germany)

24 November 2010
19:45 GMT

| Valencia (Spain) | 6–1 | (Turkey) Bursaspor |
|---|---|---|
| Mata 17' (pen.); Soldado 21', 55'; Aduriz 30'; Joaquín 37'; Domínguez 78' | Report | Batalla 69' |

Mestalla Stadium, Valencia, Spain
Referee: Bruno Paixão (Portugal)

7 December 2010
20:45 BST

| Bursaspor (Turkey) | 1–1 | (Scotland) Rangers |
|---|---|---|
| Sercan 79' | Report | Miller 19' |

Bursa Atatürk Stadium, Bursa, Turkey
Referee: Tony Chapron (France)
