= Turgay Bahadır =

Turkish-Austrian footballer

Personal information
- Date of birth: 15 January 1984 (age 42)
- Place of birth: Vienna, Austria
- Height: 1.90 m (6 ft 3 in)
- Positions: Striker; winger; attacking midfielder

Youth career
- 1999–2000: First Vienna FC
- 2000–2002: SK Rapid Wien

Senior career*
Years	Team	Apps	(Gls)
2002–2003	SK Rapid Wien II		
2003–2006	SC Austria Lustenau	78	(6)
2006–2007	SC Schwanenstadt	16	(4)
2007–2009	Kayserispor	47	(4)
2009–2012	Bursaspor	87	(20)
2012–2013	İstanbul Başakşehir	8	(1)
2013–2014	Kayseri Erciyesspor	4	(0)
2014–2015	Karabükspor	9	(1)
2015	Gaziantep BB	10	(1)
2016	First Vienna	8	(0)
2017	ASK-BSC Bruck/Leitha	1	(0)

International career
2003–2004	Austria U21	2	(0)
2010	Turkey	1	(0)
- * Club domestic league appearances and goals

Turgay Bahadır (born 15 January 1984 in Vienna) is a Turkish former footballer.

== Career ==
Bahadir began his career with First Vienna FC and won the youth championship in 1999. He was then scouted from SK Rapid Wien in the summer of 2000. He then left SK Rapid Wien and joined SC Austria Lustenau in the summer of 2003. After sixty games, he scored five goals for SC Austria Lustenau and moved on to join the league rival SC Schwanenstadt from the land of his ancestral estate Turkey in the summer of 2007. He then signed with Kayserispor for two years, playing forty-seven games and scoring four goals. Bahadir then joined Bursaspor in July 2009.

== Bursaspor ==
With Bursaspor, Bahadır advanced as a football player and fit well with the tactical gameplay of manager Ertuğrul Sağlam. During the entire 2009–2010 Turkish Super League season he usually played as a pivotal striker for Bursaspor, but due to his high technical abilities he was also used as a right winger (MCR) in the absence of Volkan Sen where he performed flawlessly. Bursaspor became the champions in the Turkish Super League 2009–2010 season for the first time in the club's history, whilst Bahadır scored 7 league goals and 3 Ziraat Turkish Cup goals. His most vital goals for Bursaspor in this season were against Trabzonspor in Huseyin Avni Aker Stadium (a high header from penalty area) in a league game and against Denizlispor in Ziraat Turkish Cup; both matches ended with 1–1 draw results.

== National team ==
He played for Austria U21 and on 15 May 2010, Turkey National Football Team manager Guus Hiddink enlisted Bahadır in the Turkey squad in addition to his fellow Bursaspor teammates Sercan Yıldırım, Volkan Şen and Ozan İpek.

== Personal ==
Bahadır is a cousin of Cem Tosun and Cemil Tosun and holds an Austrian passport.

== Honours ==
- Kayserispor
  - Turkish Cup (1): 2008
- Bursaspor
  - Süper Lig (1): 2009-10
