= List of Bursaspor seasons =

Bursaspor, established in 1963, has a rich footballing history that spans across Turkey’s top-tier and lower divisions. The club achieved its greatest success in the 2009–10 season by becoming Süper Lig champions, becoming only the second club outside the “Istanbul Big Three” to win the title. Their league performances, cup campaigns, and European adventures have made them one of the most recognized provincial clubs in Turkish football.

Bursaspor spent the majority of its early decades in the Süper Lig, frequently finishing mid-table with occasional high finishes, including third place in 1966–67. The club experienced relegations and promotions in later decades, with stints in the 1. Lig, 2. Lig, and even 3. Lig, but managed to climb back to the upper divisions on multiple occasions, including promotion back to the top flight in 2005–06 as 1. Lig champions.

Bursaspor has been a regular contender in the Turkish Cup, appearing in multiple semi-finals and finals throughout its history. The club won the 1985–86 Turkish Cup, defeating Altay, and finished as runners-up in 1970–71, 1973–74, 1991–92, 2011–12, and 2014–15. The team has played over 270 matches in the competition, showcasing a long-standing presence.

In the Turkish Super Cup, Bursaspor participated three times (1986, 2010, 2015), losing all three matches, including their most recent one against Galatasaray (0–1) in 2015.

Bursaspor also won the Prime Minister’s Cup twice—in 1971 and 1992—defeating Fenerbahçe on both occasions. These trophies remain part of the club’s domestic history.

Bursaspor has taken part in UEFA competitions on several occasions. Their most notable European run came in 1974–75, when they reached the quarter-finals of the Cup Winners’ Cup. In 1995–96, they also made it to the Intertoto Cup quarter-finals.

Following their Süper Lig triumph in 2010, they participated in the 2010–11 UEFA Champions League group stage, facing Rangers, Manchester United, and Valencia. While they did not advance, the participation marked a milestone in the club’s international exposure.

== Performance by Season ==
Season		League										Turkish Cup	UEFA	Top Scorer		Managers
Season		Pos	P	W	D	L	GF	GA	GD	% W	Pts	Turkish Cup	UEFA	Player	Goals	Managers
1963–64	1. Lig	8th	24	7	8	9	22	26	−6	29.17	29	R3		Hasan Bora	5	Muhtar Tucaltan
1964–65	1. Lig	2nd	30	16	10	4	51	26	+25	53.33	58	R2		Ersel Altıparmak	12	Muhtar Tucaltan
1965–66	1. Lig	3rd	34	22	9	3	57	15	+42	64.71	75	QF		Ersel Altıparmak	10	Muhtar Tucaltan
1966–67	1. Lig	1st	30	19	7	4	44	14	+30	63.33	64	R2		Ersel Altıparmak	15	Sabri Kiraz
1967–68	Süper Lig	6th	32	10	13	9	37	33	+4	31.25	43	R2		Mesut Şen	8	Muhtar Tucaltan
1968–69	Süper Lig	5th	30	12	8	10	32	28	+4	40.00	44	SF		Ersel Altıparmak	8	Sabri Kiraz
1969–70	Süper Lig	7th	30	10	10	10	26	20	+6	33.33	40	R2		Vahit Kolukısa	8	Tomislav Kalepović
1970–71	Süper Lig	5th	30	11	12	7	25	25	+0	36.67	45	RU		Sinan Bür	7	Tomislav Kalepović
1971–72	Süper Lig	6th	30	12	8	10	29	24	+5	40.00	44	SF		Haluk Erdemoğlu	7	Tomislav Kalepović
1972–73	Süper Lig	10th	30	6	16	8	27	29	−2	20.00	34	QF		Vahit Kolukısa	5	Kalepović / Oktay
1973–74	Süper Lig	9th	30	8	12	10	19	25	−6	26.67	36	RU		Tezcan Ozan	8	Oktay / Bora / Ertan
1974–75	Süper Lig	13th	30	6	13	11	20	27	−7	20.00	31	SF		Ali Kahraman	4	Abdullah Gegiç
1975–76	Süper Lig	10th	30	9	9	12	30	33	−3	30.00	36	R3		Tacettin Ergürsel	8	Ertan / Bora
1976–77	Süper Lig	6th	30	10	11	9	34	30	+4	33.33	41	R3		Tacettin Ergürsel	14	Kemal Ömeragiç
1977–78	Süper Lig	10th	30	9	10	11	26	24	+2	30.00	37	SF		Orhan Kırıkçılar	13	Kemal Ömeragiç
1978–79	Süper Lig	12th	30	7	13	10	25	33	−8	23.33	34	QF		Orhan Kırıkçılar	5	Bora / Tucaltan
1979–80	Süper Lig	4th	30	12	9	9	28	28	+0	40.00	45	R5		Bahtiyar Yorulmaz	12	Niş / Tucaltan
1980–81	Süper Lig	9th	30	12	6	12	30	30	+0	40.00	42	SF		Ahmet Kılıç	7	Fethi Demircan
1981–82	Süper Lig	13th	32	11	9	12	25	26	−1	34.38	42	SF		Sedat Özden	5	Gündüz Tekin Onay
1982–83	Süper Lig	8th	34	11	11	12	36	34	+2	32.35	44	R6		Beyhan Çalışkan	9	Kemal Ömeragiç
1983–84	Süper Lig	10th	34	8	15	11	29	33	−4	23.53	39	QF		Beyhan Çalışkan	6	Kemal Ömeragiç
1984–85	Süper Lig	9th	34	9	13	12	39	47	−8	26.47	40	R3		Mirsad Sejdic	14	Bora / Milić
1985–86	Süper Lig	16th	36	9	13	14	36	40	−4	25.00	40	W		Gürsel Hattat	9	Szarvaş / Tucaltan / Kaloperović
1986–87	Süper Lig	17th	36	10	8	18	29	40	−11	27.78	38	R6	Q1	Nejat Biyediç	4	Kaloperović / Oral / Bür / Özden / H. Endersert / Ömeragiç
1987–88	Süper Lig	5th	38	17	6	15	63	56	+7	44.74	57	R4		Nejat Biyediç	17	Nevzat Güzelırmak
1988–89	Süper Lig	9th	36	12	8	16	42	53	–11	33.33	44	R4		Şenol Ulusavaş	8	Özyazıcı / Gökdel
1989–90	Süper Lig	6th	34	13	8	13	46	45	+1	38.24	47	SF		Nejat Biyediç	14	Gökdel / Vural
1990–91	Süper Lig	8th	30	11	5	14	31	36	–5	36.67	38	R6		Erhan Kiremitçi	13	Nunweiller / Đorđe Milić
1991–92	Süper Lig	6th	30	10	10	10	44	43	+1	33.33	40	RU		Hakan Şükür	7	Milić / Vural
1992–93	Süper Lig	6th	30	12	6	12	42	42	+0	40.00	42	QF		Ali Nail Durmuş	8	Yılmaz Vural
1993–94	Süper Lig	9th	30	9	8	13	26	39	–13	30.00	35	R6		Frank Pingel	12	Sepp Piontek
1994–95	Süper Lig	6th	34	13	12	9	47	39	+8	47.06	51	QF		Majid Musisi	9	Güzelırmak / Biyediç
1995–96	Süper Lig	9th	34	10	11	13	56	48	+8	29.41	41	R6	QF	Majid Musisi	15	Biyediç / Bür
1996–97	Süper Lig	5th	34	17	8	9	55	37	+18	50.00	59	R6		Elvir Baljić	21	Gordon Milne
1997–98	Süper Lig	8th	34	12	9	13	46	50	–4	35.29	45	QF		Elvir Baljić	12	Kara / Ertekin
1998–99	Süper Lig	12th	34	11	6	17	51	69	–18	32.35	39	R6		Murat Sözkesen	11	Akcan / Özberk
1999–00	Süper Lig	10th	34	12	6	16	51	63	–12	35.29	42	SF		Okan Yılmaz	13	Yılmaz Vural
2000–01	Süper Lig	14th	34	11	7	16	55	60	–5	32.35	40	R4		Okan Yılmaz	23	Berger / Biyediç
2001–02	Süper Lig	10th	34	13	5	16	48	60	–12	38.24	44	R3		Okan Yılmaz	13	Nejat Biyediç
2002–03	Süper Lig	15th	34	9	9	16	42	62	–20	26.47	36	R2		Okan Yılmaz	24	Biyediç / Arıca
2003–04	Süper Lig	16th	34	10	10	14	40	40	+0	29.41	40	R3		Okan Yılmaz	14	Hagi / Kayihan / Biyediç
2004–05	1. Lig	4th	34	18	9	7	61	26	+35	52.94	63	R3		Okan Yılmaz	25	Kalpar / Gündüz
2005–06	1. Lig	1st	34	21	8	5	56	26	+30	61.76	71	GA		Yunus Altun	12	Raşit Çetiner
2006–07	Süper Lig	10th	34	12	9	13	36	42	–6	35.29	45	QF		Sinan Kaloğlu	9	Çetiner / İpekoğlu
2007–08	Süper Lig	13th	34	9	11	14	31	40	–9	26.47	38	GA		Hervé Tum	6	Korkmaz / Aybaba
2008–09	Süper Lig	6th	34	16	10	8	47	36	+11	47.06	58	QF		Sercan Yıldırım	11	Aybaba / Kurtar / Sağlam
2009–10	Süper Lig	1st	34	23	6	5	65	26	+39	67.65	75	QF		Ozan İpek	8	Ertuğrul Sağlam
2010–11	Süper Lig	3rd	34	17	10	7	50	29	+21	50.00	61	GA	GA	Sercan Yıldırım	7	Ertuğrul Sağlam
2011–12	Süper Lig	8th	40	17	10	13	52	41	+11	42.50	49	RU	PO	Pablo Batalla	9	Ertuğrul Sağlam
2012–13	Süper Lig	4th	34	14	13	7	52	41	+11	41.18	55	GA	PO	Pablo Batalla	15	Sağlam / Karaman
2013–14	Süper Lig	8th	34	12	10	12	40	46	−6	35.29	46	SF	3Q	Fernandao	10	Daum / Buz
2014–15	Süper Lig	6th	34	16	9	9	69	44	+25	47.06	57	RU	2Q	Fernandao	26	Şenol Güneş
2015–16	Süper Lig	11th	34	13	5	16	47	55	−8	38.24	44	R16		Tomas Necid	16	Sağlam / Uzgur / Hamzaoğlu
2016–17	Süper Lig	14th	34	11	5	18	34	58	−24	32.35	38	GA		Pablo Batalla	9	Hamzaoğlu / Topçu / Örnek
2017–18	Süper Lig	13th	34	11	6	17	43	48	−5	32.35	39	R16		Bogdan Stancu	8	Le Guen / Er
2018–19	Süper Lig	16th	34	7	16	11	28	37	−9	20.59	37	R4		Aytaç Kara	6	Aybaba / Bakkal
2019–20	1. Lig	6th	36	17	9	10	50	45	+5	47.22	56	R5		Yevhen Seleznyov	13	Koşukavak / Üzülmez / Buz
2020–21	1. Lig	10th	34	14	4	16	56	57	−1	41.18	46	R16		Batuhan Kör	11	Mustafa Er
2021–22	1. Lig	17th	36	12	8	16	43	53	−10	33.33	44	R5		Namiq Alasgarov	6	Er / Tekke / Bizati / Tuna
2022–23	2. Lig	14th	36	12	10	14	51	57	−6	33.33	46	R2		Enver Cenk Şahin	10	Tam / Ertekin / Hurmacı
2023–24	2. Lig	18th	36	6	8	22	28	64	−36	16.67	23	R2		Çağatay Yılmaz	12	Gündüz / Vatansever / Sözkesen / Şengül / Serbest
2024–25	3. Lig	1st	28	20	7	1	60	14	+46	71.43	67	R4		Ahmet İlhan Özek	10	Batalla (23), Çağlayan (5)

== Turkish Cup performance ==
Season	Result	P	W	D	L	GF	GA
1963–64	3rd Round	3	2	0	1	7	6
1964–65	2nd Round	1	0	0	1	3	4
1965–66	Quarter-finals	7	5	0	2	11	5
1966–67	2nd Round	1	0	1	0	2	2
1967–68	2nd Round	4	2	0	2	4	4
1968–69	Semi-finals	8	5	2	1	11	5
1969–70	2nd Round	4	1	3	0	2	1
1970–71	Final	10	4	4	2	9	7
1971–72	Semi-finals	6	3	1	2	7	5
1972–73	Quarter-finals	6	3	2	1	10	7
1973–74	Final	10	5	3	2	12	10
1974–75	Semi-finals	6	4	1	1	8	5
1975–76	3rd Round	2	1	0	1	2	2
1976–77	3rd Round	2	0	1	1	1	4
1977–78	Semi-finals	8	4	2	2	13	5
1978–79	Quarter-finals	6	5	0	1	11	5
1979–80	5th Round	2	1	0	1	1	2
1980–81	Semi-finals	8	3	2	3	10	6
1981–82	Semi-finals	8	4	3	1	11	5
1982–83	6th Round	4	1	1	2	5	4
1983–84	Quarter-finals	6	3	2	1	9	5
1984–85	3rd Round	2	0	1	1	0	1
1985–86	Winner	5	5	0	0	10	1
1986–87	6th Round	4	2	0	2	5	6
1987–88	4th Round	4	3	0	1	10	6
1988–89	4th Round	4	1	1	2	5	7
1989–90	Semi-finals	3	2	1	0	11	5
1990–91	6th Round	2	1	0	1	4	5
1991–92	Final	7	6	0	1	16	8
1992–93	Quarter-finals	2	1	0	1	3	3
1993–94	6th Round	2	1	0	1	2	2
1994–95	Quarter-finals	4	1	2	1	7	7
1995–96	6th Round	1	0	1	0	0	0
1996–97	6th Round	2	0	1	1	1	3
1997–98	Quarter-finals	4	1	1	2	5	5
1998–99	6th Round	2	0	1	1	1	3
1999–2000	Semi-finals	4	3	0	1	6	3
2000–01	4th Round	2	1	0	1	5	3
2001–02	3rd Round	1	0	0	1	2	3
2002–03	2nd Round	1	0	0	1	1	2
2003–04	3rd Round	2	1	0	1	1	1
2004–05	3rd Round	3	2	0	1	4	2
2005–06	1st Round	1	0	0	1	0	1
2006–07	3rd Round	5	2	1	2	8	7
2007–08	3rd Round	5	2	2	1	6	5
2008–09	Quarter-finals	7	4	0	3	13	6
2009–10	Quarter-finals	7	5	1	1	13	7
2010–11	3rd Round	4	1	1	2	4	5
2011–12	Final	5	4	0	1	13	6
2012–13	Group Stage	8	3	1	4	10	9
2013–14	Semi-finals	10	6	2	2	20	12
2014–15	Final	13	6	5	2	27	14
2015–16	Round of 16	8	7	0	1	22	9
2016–17	Group Stage	8	4	2	2	13	9
2017–18	Round of 16	6	4	1	1	10	2
2018–19	4th Round	1	0	0	1	1	2
2019–20	5th Round	4	3	0	1	9	7
2020–21	Round of 16	4	2	1	1	7	8
2021–22	5th Round	3	2	1	0	9	3
2022–23	2nd Round	1	0	0	1	0	1
2023–24	2nd Round	1	0	0	1	1	2
2024–25	4th Round	4	3	1	0	7	5
Total		277	145	56	76	441	295

== Turkish Super Cup performance ==
Note:' Bursaspor is listed as the home team.

Season	Result	Opponent	Score
1986	Lost	Beşiktaş	1–2
2010	Lost	Trabzonspor	0–3
2015	Lost	Galatasaray	0–1

== Prime Minister's Cup performance ==
Note:' Bursaspor is listed as the home team.

Season	Result	Opponent	Score
1971	Won	Fenerbahçe	1–0
1974	Lost	Beşiktaş	2–3
1992	Won	Fenerbahçe	3–1

== European competitions performance ==
Season	Competition	Matches	W	D	L	GF	GA	Pts	Result
1974–75	UEFA Cup Winners' Cup	6	2	2	2	5	5	8	Quarter-finals
1986–87	UEFA Cup Winners' Cup	2	0	0	2	0	4	0	First round
1995–96	UEFA Intertoto Cup	6	4	0	2	14	5	12	Quarter-finals
2010–11	UEFA Champions League	6	0	1	5	2	16	1	Group stage
2011–12	UEFA Europa League	4	2	1	1	8	6	7	Play-off round
2012–13	UEFA Europa League	4	2	0	2	10	6	6	Play-off round
2013–14	UEFA Europa League	2	0	1	1	2	5	1	Third qualifying round
2014–15	UEFA Europa League	2	0	2	0	0	0	2	Second qualifying round
Total		32	10	7	15	41	47	37	
