= Centennial Atatürk Stadium =

Stadium in Bursa, Turkey

Yüzüncü Yıl Atatürk Stadyumu
- Atatürk Spor Kompleksi (UEFA competitions)
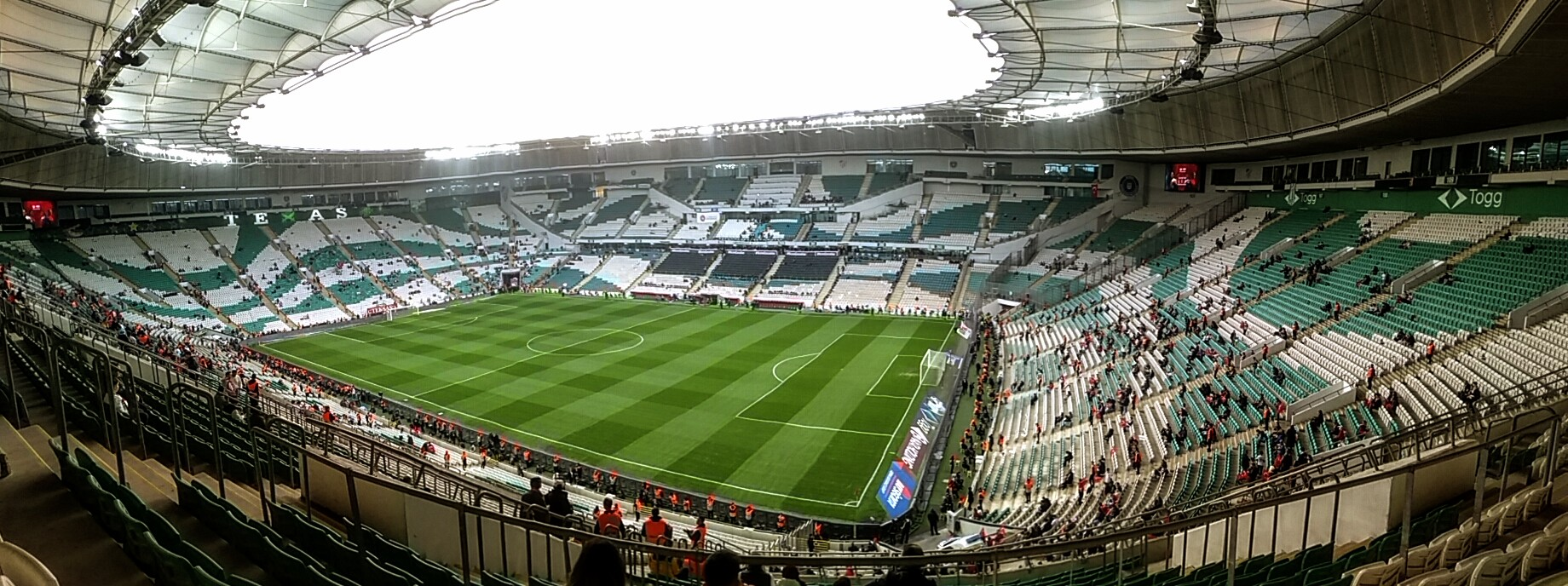
- UEFA
- Interactive map of Yüzüncü Yıl Atatürk Stadyumu
- Full name: Atatürk Spor Kompleksi Matlı Stadyumu
- Former names: Timsah Arena (2015–2017); Timsah Park (2017–2021); Bitci Timsah Park (2021–2023)
- Location: Bursa, Turkey
- Coordinates: 40°12′39″N 29°00′34″E
- Owner: Ministry of Youth and Sports
- Operator: Bursaspor
- Capacity: 43,361
- Executive suites: 72
- Surface: GrassMaster hybrid grass
- Record attendance: 42,756 (Turkey v. Bulgaria, 15 November 2025)

Construction
- Groundbreaking: 1 June 2011
- Built: 2011–2015
- Opened: 21 December 2015
- Cost: ₺167,809,000 (€55,497,934)
- Architect: Hasan Sözüneri
- General contractor: Gintaş İnşaat Taahhüt ve Ticaret A.Ş.

Tenants
- Bursaspor (2016–present); Turkey national football team (selected matches)

The Centennial Atatürk Stadium (Turkish: Yüzüncü Yıl Atatürk Stadyumu), branded as Atatürk Spor Kompleksi Matlı Stadyumu for sponsorship reasons, is an association football stadium in Bursa, Turkey. It has a capacity of 43,361 spectators and is home to Bursaspor, replacing the Bursa Atatürk Stadium.

The stadium is called the Atatürk Spor Kompleksi in UEFA competitions.

== Stadium design ==
The design of the stadium features a large crocodile's head attached to the north end of the ground, which was constructed from white and green polytetrafluoroethylene, green polyvinyl chloride and glass. This is reflected in the stadium's initial name of the Timsah Arena (English: Crocodile Arena).

== International football ==
The stadium has been included in various bids by Turkey to host the UEFA European Championship, including the unsuccessful bid for UEFA Euro 2024 and the successful bid for UEFA Euro 2032.

=== Turkey national football team matches ===
The stadium has hosted the Turkish national team. A 2–0 defeat to Croatia during UEFA Euro 2024 qualifying was played at the ground.

The following national team matches were held in the stadium.

Date	Time (CEST)	Team #1	Res.	Team #2	Round	Attendance
28 March 2023	20:45	Turkey	0–2	Croatia	UEFA Euro 2024 qualifying	37,750
15 November 2025	20:00	Turkey	2–0	Bulgaria	2026 FIFA World Cup qualification	42,756
28 September 2026	20:45	Turkey	1–4	Italy	2026–27 UEFA Nations League	33,891
