= Ahmet Arı =

Turkish footballer (born 1989)

Personal information
- Full name: Ahmet Arı
- Date of birth: 13 January 1989 (age 37)
- Place of birth: Batman, Turkey
- Height: 1.75 m (5 ft 9 in)
- Position: Attacking midfielder

Team information
- Current team: Mardin Fosfatspor

Youth career
- 2003–2005: 72 Batmanspor

Senior career*
Years	Team	Apps	(Gls)
2005–2011	Gaziantepspor	52	(3)
2008	→ Gaziantep BB (loan)	14	(2)
2011–2013	Bursaspor	6	(0)
2012–2013	→ Samsunspor (loan)	16	(0)
2013–2014	Denizlispor	17	(2)
2014–2015	Karşıyaka SK	43	(11)
2015–2016	Şanlıurfaspor	9	(0)
2016	Altınordu	8	(1)
2016–2017	Menemen Belediyespor	15	(4)
2017–2018	Sivas Belediyespor	28	(3)
2018–2019	Bayrampaşaspor	8	(0)
2019	Tokatspor	22	(3)
2020	Diyarbakirspor	8	(0)
2020–	Mardin Fosfatspor	0	(0)
- * Club domestic league appearances and goals as of 15 March 2020

Ahmet Arı (born 13 January 1989) is a Turkish professional footballer who currently plays as a midfielder for Mardin Fosfatspor. He was a youth international.

== Club career ==
Arı began his career with local club 72 Batmanspor in 2003. He was transferred to Gaziantepspor in 2005, where has played since. He has also spent six months on loan with Gaziantep Büyükşehir Belediyespor, from January to May 2008. He has transferred to Bursaspor in 2011.

On 11 August 2012, he joined Samsunspor on a season-long loan.
