= Yenal Tuncer =

Turkish footballer (born 1985)

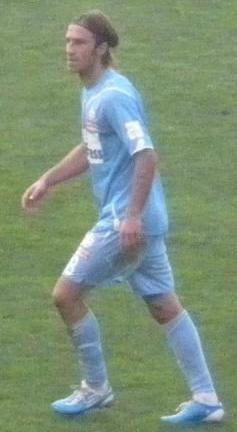

Personal information
- Full name: Yenal Tuncer
- Date of birth: 28 April 1985 (age 41)
- Place of birth: Denizli, Turkey
- Height: 1.83 m (6 ft 0 in)
- Positions: Defender; left-back

Youth career
- Denizlispor

Senior career*
Years	Team	Apps	(Gls)
2004–2006	Denizli Belediyespor	60	(1)
2006–2013	Bursaspor	33	(1)
2010–2011	→ Antalyaspor (loan)	29	(0)
2011–2012	→ Samsunspor (loan)	12	(0)
2012–2013	→ Denizlispor (loan)	8	(0)
2013	→ Mersin İdmanyurdu (loan)	0	(0)
2013–2014	Denizlispor	8	(0)
2014–2015	Karşıyaka	23	(2)
2015–2017	Gaziantep BB	16	(0)
2017	Pendikspor	5	(0)
2018	Kızılcabölükspor	9	(0)
2019	Kemerspor 2003	13	(2)
- * Club domestic league appearances and goals as of 28 April 2019

Yenal Tuncer (born 28 April 1985) is a Turkish footballer. He is a left defender and winger.

== Honours ==
- Bursaspor
  - Süper Lig (1): 2009–10
