= Damián Steinert =

Argentine footballer

Personal information
- Full name: Héctor Damián Steinert
- Date of birth: February 25, 1986 (age 40)
- Place of birth: Paraná, Argentina
- Height: 1.76 m (5 ft 9 in)
- Position: Winger

Senior career*
Years	Team	Apps	(Gls)
2004–2009	Newell's Old Boys	73	(5)
2009–2010	Racing Club	7	(0)
2010–2011	Bursaspor	3	(0)
2011–2012	3 de Febrero	1	(0)
2016–	Unión de Crespo	0	(0)
- * Club domestic league appearances and goals as of 17 January 2016

Héctor Damián Steinert (born 25 February 1986 in Paraná, Entre Ríos) is an Argentine football winger who plays as a forward for Unión de Crespo in the Torneo Federal C.

Steinert made his debut for Newell's in 2004 and was part of the squad that won the Apertura 2004 championship. In 2009, he played in Racing Club.

== Titles ==
Season	Team	Title
Apertura 2004	Newell's Old Boys	Primera División Argentina
