= Birol Hikmet =

Turkish footballer

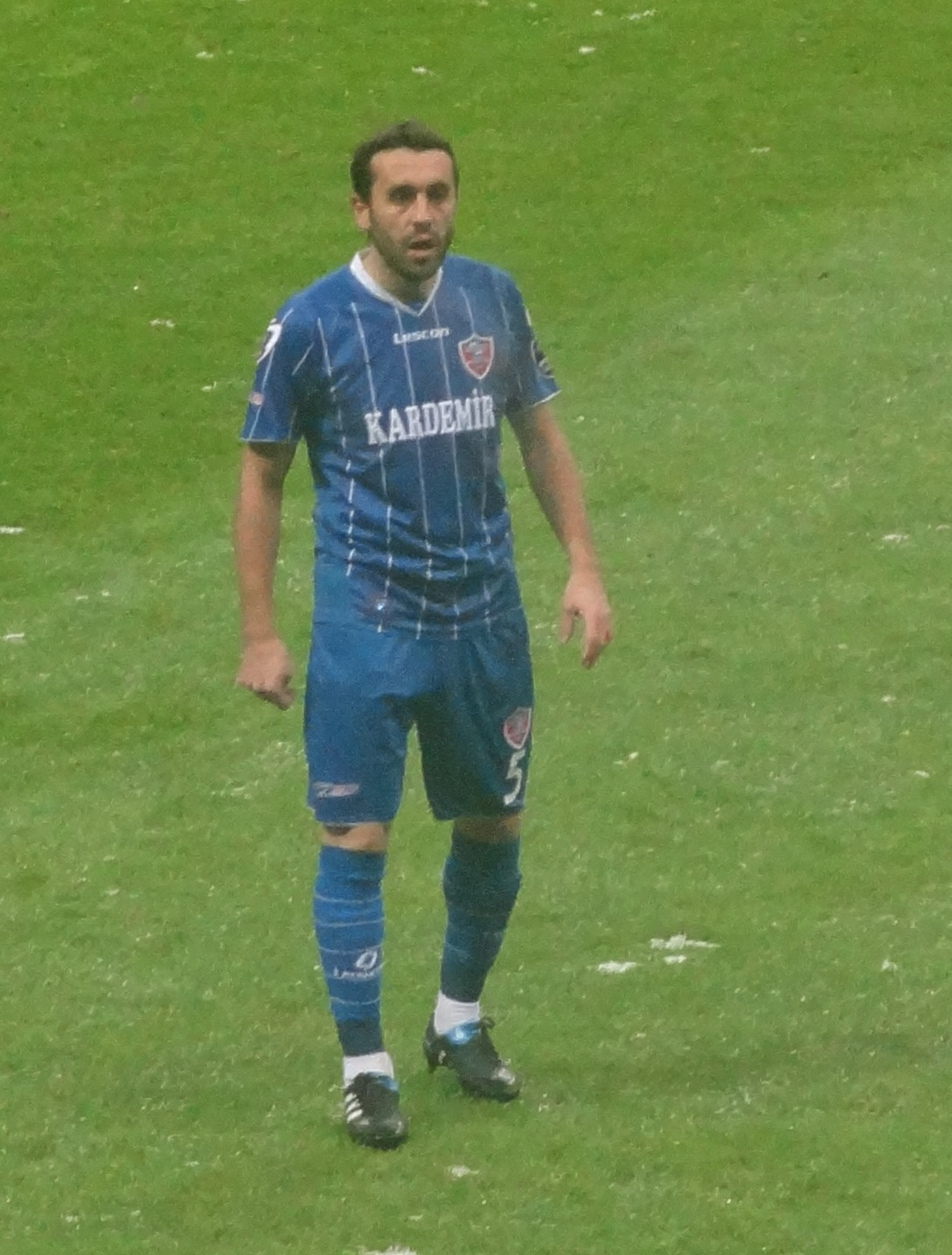

Personal information
- Date of birth: 24 March 1982 (age 44)
- Place of birth: Akyazı, Turkey
- Height: 1.78 m (5 ft 10 in)
- Position: Defensive midfielder

Youth career
- 1996–2000: Zeytinburnuspor
- 2000–2001: Güngören Belediyespor

Senior career*
Years	Team	Apps	(Gls)
2001–2007	Güngören Belediyespor	160	(11)
2007–2008	Eskişehirspor	50	(2)
2008–2009	Diyarbakirspor	12	(0)
2009–2013	Karabükspor	111	(8)
2013–2014	Adana Demirspor	11	(2)
2014	Gaziantepspor	8	(0)
2014–2015	Elazığspor	12	(2)
2015	Giresunspor	5	(0)
2015–2016	Gümüşhanespor	7	(1)
- * Club domestic league appearances and goals

Birol Hikmet (born 24 March 1982) is a Turkish former footballer.

== Career ==
Hikmet currently plays for Adana Demirspor in the defensive midfielder position.

He is more passive when he defends. Rather than tackle a player, he is more likely to shadow him, thus pushing him back. This mentality earns him both praise and criticism.

Despite Hikmet's high pass completion rate, his passing has been described as erratic in the past. A possible explanation for this is his short passing range.
