= Hakan Söyler =

Turkish footballer

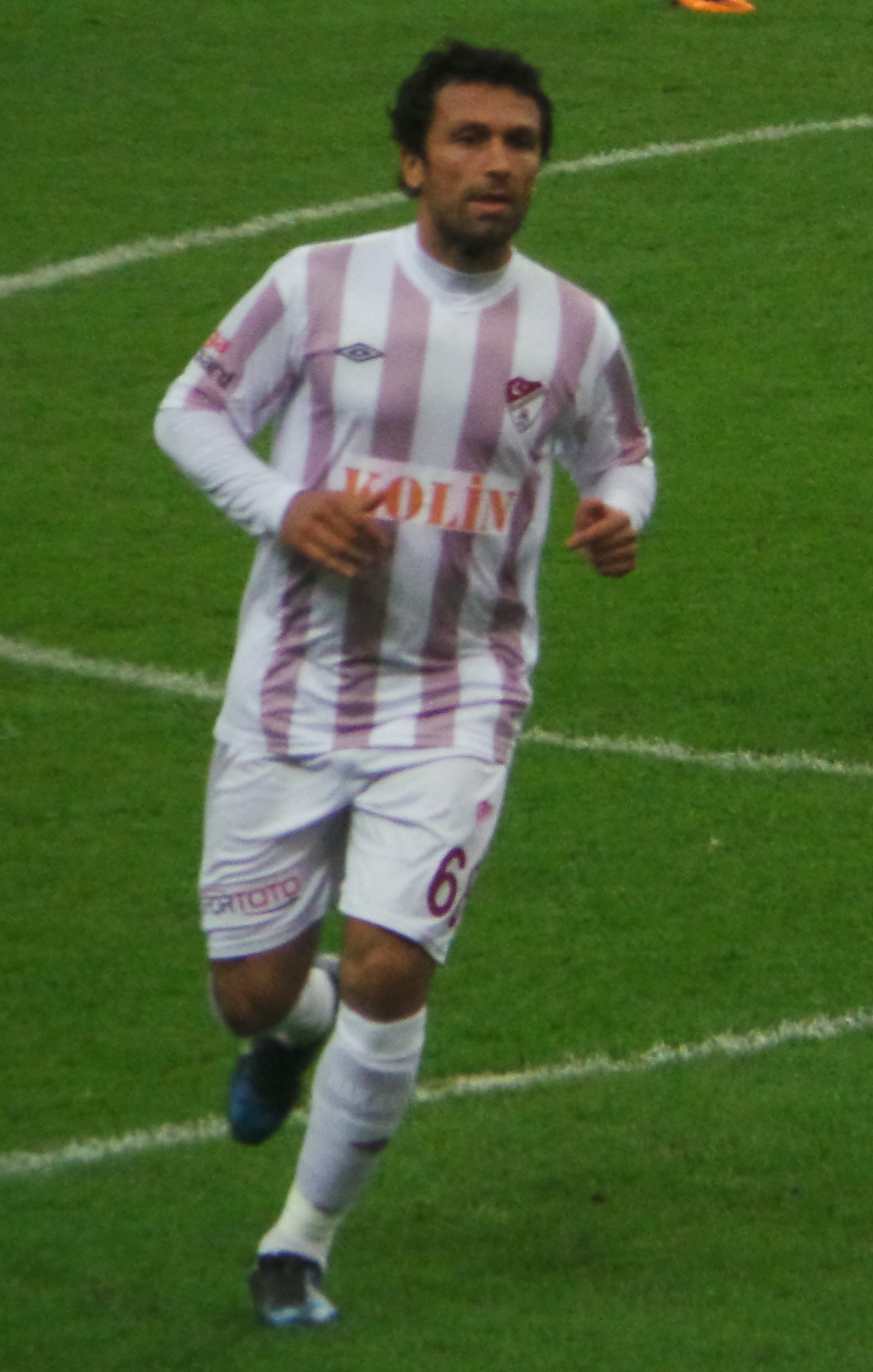

Personal information
- Date of birth: April 8, 1983 (age 43)
- Place of birth: Ankara, Turkey
- Height: 1.79 m (5 ft 10 1/2 in)
- Position: Defensive midfielder

Youth career
- –1999: Petrol Ofisi Spor
- 1999–2001: Gençlerbirliği

Senior career*
Years	Team	Apps	(Gls)
2001–2003	Hacettepe	44	(1)
2003–2005	Aydınspor	42	(1)
2005–2009	Malatyaspor	84	(3)
2009–2013	Karabükspor	85	(3)
2013–2014	Elazığspor	5	(0)
2014–2015	Adana Demirspor	6	(0)
2015	Hatayspor	4	(0)
2016	İnegölspor	2	(0)

International career
1998–1999	Turkey U15	12	(0)
1999–2000	Turkey U16	30	(2)
2000–2001	Turkey U17	3	(0)
2001	Turkey U18	3	(0)
2001	Turkey U19	3	(0)
- * Club domestic league appearances and goals as of 21 February 2016

Hakan Söyler (born 8 April 1983) is a Turkish former professional footballer.
