= Bekir Ozan Has =

Turkish footballer

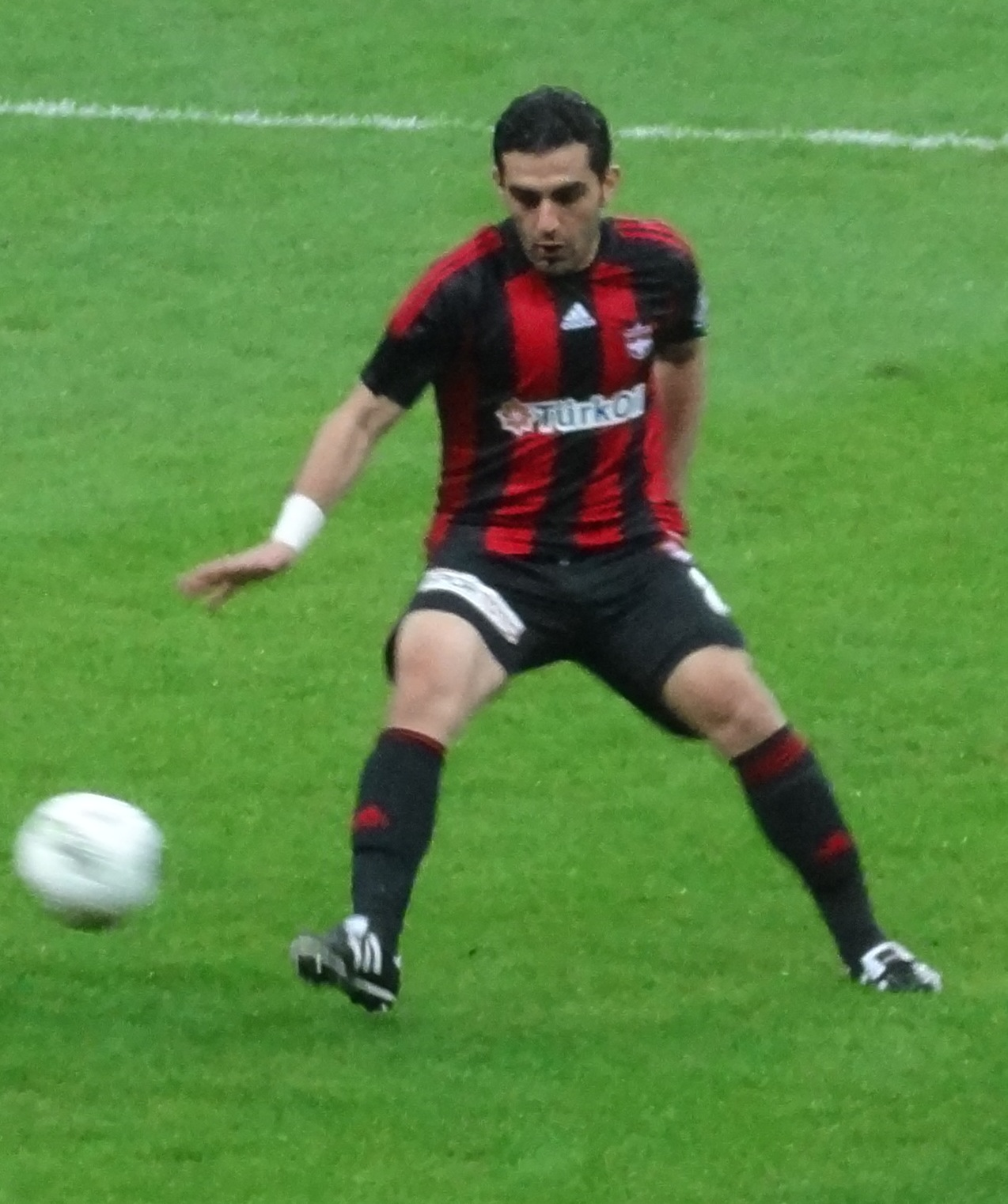

Personal information
- Date of birth: 18 February 1985 (age 41)
- Place of birth: Manisa, Turkey
- Height: 1.75 m (5 ft 9 in)
- Positions: Central midfielder; centre-back

Youth career
- 2002–2003: Yeni Salihlispor
- 2003–2004: Bursaspor

Senior career*
Years	Team	Apps	(Gls)
2004–2006	Bursa Merinosspor	54	(7)
2006–2011	Bursaspor	86	(3)
2011–2015	Gaziantepspor	75	(3)
2015	Şanlıurfaspor	1	(0)
2015–2016	Karabükspor	6	(0)
2016–2017	Fethiyespor	28	(4)
2017	Yeşil Bursa SK	7	(0)
- * Club domestic league appearances and goals as of 14 March 2018

Bekir Ozan Has (born 18 February 1985) is a Turkish footballer who most recently played for Yeşil Bursa SK. He was one of the young players of Bursaspor whom coach Samet Aybaba trusted and gave the opportunity to play 2007–2008 season. He's regarded as a promising central midfielder.

== Honours ==
- Bursaspor
  - Süper Lig (1): 2009–10
