= Serhat Akyüz =

Turkish footballer

Personal information
- Date of birth: August 10, 1984 (age 42)
- Place of birth: Maçka, Turkey
- Height: 1.85 m (6 ft 1 in)
- Position: Defender

Team information
- Current team: Tekirdağspor

Senior career*
Years	Team	Apps	(Gls)
2004–2005	Istanbulspor	39	(1)
2005–2008	Çaykur Rizespor	68	(2)
2008–2010	Konyaspor	18	(2)
2010–2011	Istanbul BB	19	(0)
2011–2013	Çaykur Rizespor	15	(0)
2013–2014	Balıkesirspor	7	(0)
2014	Ankaragücü	19	(0)
2014–2015	Sarıyer SK	13	(0)
2015–2016	Cizrespor	10	(1)
2016–2017	BB Erzurumspor	11	(0)
2017	Tuzlaspor	6	(0)
2018–	Tekirdağspor	?	(?)
- * Club domestic league appearances and goals as of 10 December 2017

Serhat Akyüz (born 10 August 1984 in Maçka) is a Turkish football defender of Tekirdağspor.
