= Ertuğrul Sağlam =

Turkish footballer and manager

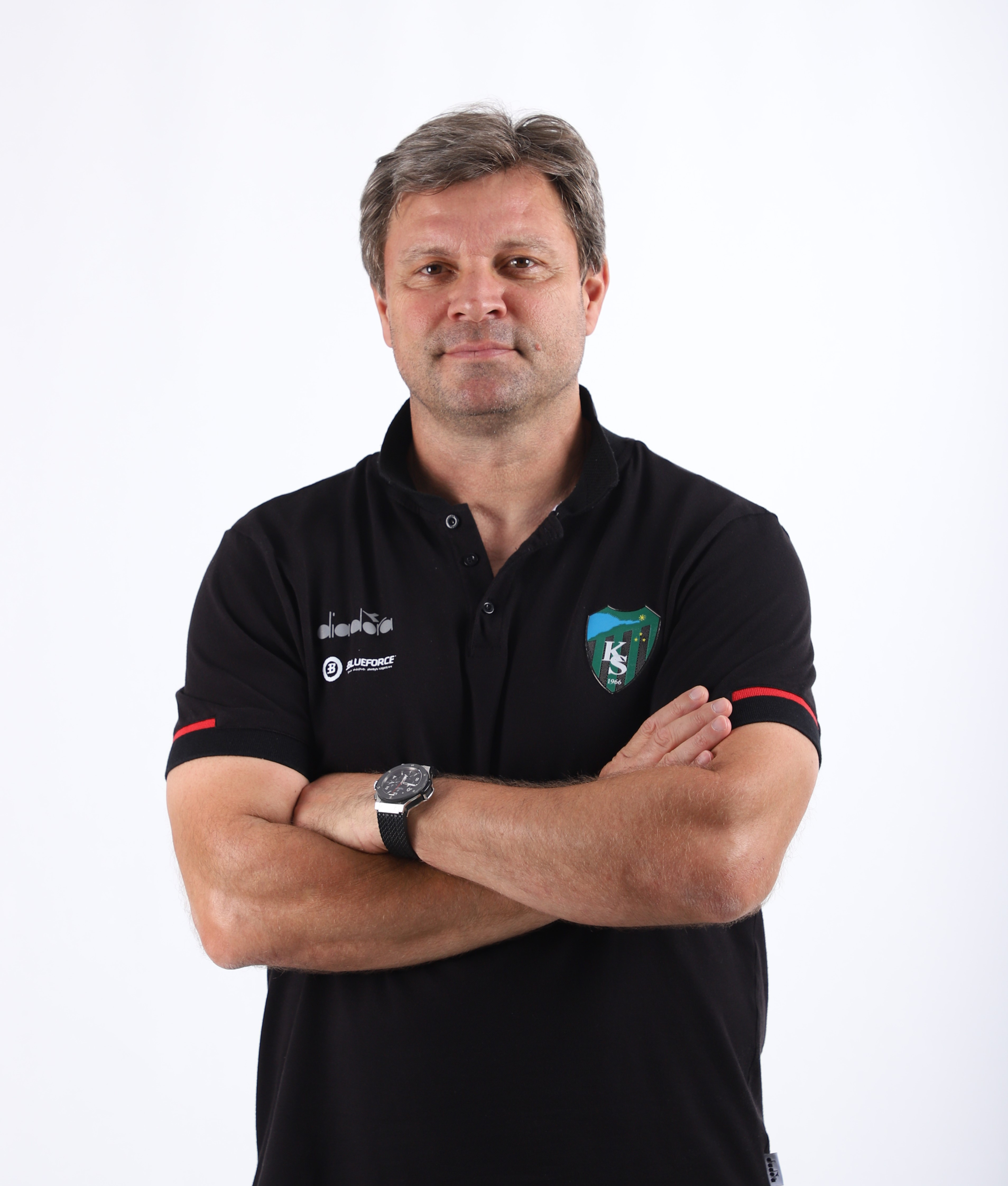

Personal information
- Full name: Ertuğrul Sağlam
- Date of birth: November 19, 1969 (age 57)
- Place of birth: Zonguldak, Turkey
- Height: 1.85 m (6 ft 1 in)
- Position: Striker

Youth career
- 1985–1986: Fenerbahçe

Senior career*
| Years | Team | Apps | (Gls) |
| 1986–1988 | Gaziantepspor | 21 | (7) |
| 1988–1994 | Samsunspor | 138 | (42) |
| 1994–2000 | Beşiktaş | 167 | (106) |
| 2000–2003 | Samsunspor | 75 | (21) |
| Total | | 380 | (169) |

International career
| 1993–1997 | Turkey | 26 | (11) |

Managerial career
- 2004–2005: Samsunspor
- 2005–2007: Kayserispor
- 2007–2008: Beşiktaş
- 2009–2013: Bursaspor
- 2013–2015: Eskişehirspor
- 2015: Bursaspor
- 2017: Yeni Malatyaspor
- 2018: Tractor
- 2018: Kayserispor
- 2019–2021: Samsunspor
- 2022: Tractor
- 2023–2024: Kocaelispor
- 2024: Kocaelispor
- * Club domestic league appearances and goals

Ertuğrul Sağlam (born 19 November 1969) is a Turkish professional football manager and former player who most recently coached Kocaelispor.

== Playing career ==
As a player, he scored 11 goals in 30 appearances for Turkey, and was selected for the Euro 1996 squad. He began his career playing for Fenerbahçe Youth but never played a professional game with the club and signed for Gaziantepspor. He spent nine years playing for Samsunspor during two spells, and helped the club to promotion to the Turkish top flight in 1991 and again in 1993 after relegation. He also played for Beşiktaş between 1994 and 2000. When he signed from Samsunspor to Beşiktaş in 1994, he was the most expensive signing in Turkish football, when Beşiktaş paid 70 Billion ₺, equivalent to around 3 Million $, at the time. For the time being, that amount of money was unprecedented in Turkish Football history. He played as an offensive midfielder and as a striker before joining Beşiktaş. A few years later, the then Beşiktaş coach John Benjamin Toshack used Sağlam as a central defender. He was quite successful in that position, too.

During his six years at Beşiktaş, he scored 103 goals in 167 games. After he was traded in exchange with defender Erman Güraçar from Samsunspor, he could not stop his tears at the airport. After first helping Samsunspor to promotion to the Süper Lig during his first spell as a player with the club, he took over the reins of manager at the end of three years as a player during his second spell at the club. He signed a two-year managerial contract. His first ever game as a manager saw Samsunspor lose 1–3 at home to Beşiktaş, and saw them win only two of their first 10 games, suffering a heavy 5–0 defeat to Malatyaspor. Sağlam was manager of Kayserispor for two seasons from the July 2005 to May 2007. Kayserispor were promoted to the Turkish top flight at the beginning of the 2004–05 season. It was their first season in the Süper Lig. In July 2007 Sağlam became the manager of Turkish giants Beşiktaş. He guided them to a third-place finish in the League in the 2007–08 season, with a joint number of points with second placed Fenerbahçe with 73 points, six behind champions Galatasaray.

== Managerial career ==
=== Early career ===
In 2006, Sağlam was voted one of the top 20 most promising coaches by respected football magazine Champions. In 2006, he won the now defunct Intertoto Cup, with Kayserispor of Turkey. He has previously managed two of the clubs he had played for, those being Samsunspor and Beşiktaş. On 16 May 2010, Bursaspor won the Super Lig after beating defending champions Beşiktaş 2–1 at home. They won the league by just one point above second placed Fenerbahçe, although they had an 11-point gap over third placed Galatasaray. Bursaspor had the strongest strikeforce and the second strongest defence, of all teams in the league. It was manager Sağlam's first full season in charge having taken over in January 2009, and it is the first time he, and Bursaspor, won the league.

After first helping Samsunspor to promotion to the Süper Lig during his first spell as a player with the club, he took over the reins of manager at the end of three years as a player during his second spell at the club. He signed a two-year managerial contract. His first ever game as a manager saw Samsunspor lose 1–3 at home to Beşiktaş, and saw them win only two of their first 10 games, suffering a heavy 5–0 defeat to Malatyaspor. However, by November 2003, Samsunspor's form rapidly improved and they impressively won against all of the "Istanbul big three", recording an impressive 0–4 away win at Beşiktaş, a 3–0 home win against Fenerbahçe, and 1–0 at home to Galatasaray. At the end of the 2003–04 season, they finished 7th in the table. The following season, 2004-05, was less successful and they finished in 12th position.

=== Kayserispor ===
Sağlam was manager of Kayserispor for two seasons from the July 2005 to May 2007. Kayserispor were promoted to the Turkish top flight at the beginning of the 2004–05 season. It was their first season in the Süper Lig. They appointed Sağlam as their manager after finishing just two places above the relegation zone at the end of 2005. In the 2005–06 season, Sağlam's first in charge and Kayseri's second in the Süper Lig, he guided them to 5th place in the table with 51 points. As well as beating Fenerbahçe 1–0, Kayseri recorded astounding victories, in beating Manisaspor 7–2 at home and a 5–0 away win against Sivasspor. Sağlam also the pleasure of defeating Samsunspor, the club he used to play for and previously managed, 6–3. Through their league position, qualified for the now defunct Intertoto Cup in 2006. The competition was Kayseri's first ever European competition, and they won the 2006 Intertoto cup, defeating Sopron and AEL along the way. Winning the cup allowed Kayseri to advance to the qualifying round of the UEFA Cup, now the UEFA Europa League. In the UEFA Cup Kayserispor beat Albanian side Tirana 5–1 on aggregate in the second qualifying round, but were then eliminated by AZ Alkmaar 4–3 on aggregate in the first round. His second season in charge, saw Kayseri finish the 2005–06 season, again in 5th position in the league, just five points behind 3rd place Galatasaray.

=== Beşiktaş ===
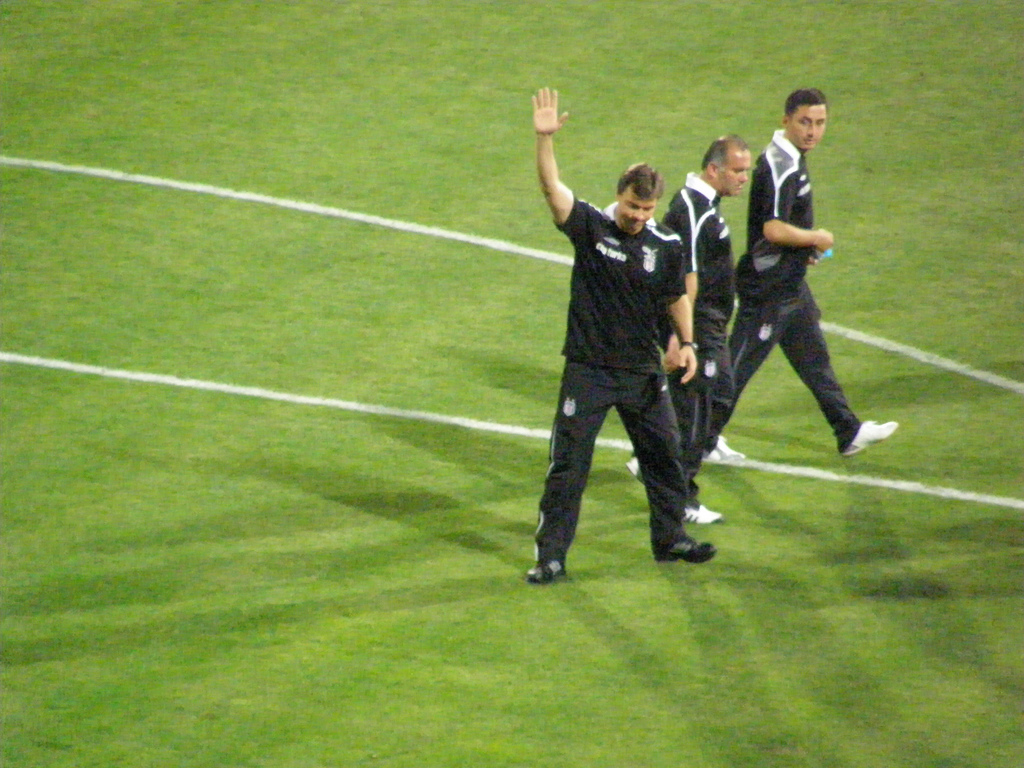
Sağlam before a Beşiktaş match

In July 2007 Sağlam became the manager of Turkish giants Beşiktaş. He guided them to a third-place finish in the league in the 2007–08 season, with a joint number of points with second placed Fenerbahçe with 73 points, six behind champions Galatasaray. Although domestically Beşiktaş had a good season, they became a part of football history when the team lost 8–0 away to Liverpool in the Champions League in November 2007. The following season Beşiktaş won four of their first six games and drew the other two. However, he resigned on 7 October 2008. His last game being a 2–1 home victory against Hacettepe the previous day.

=== Bursaspor ===
==== Appointment and first year ====
Bursaspor were promoted back to the Süper Lig at the end of the 2005–06 season. On 2 January 2009 Sağlam was appointed Bursaspor manager, signing a three-year contract, after two previous managers; Samet Aybaba and Güvenç Kurtar both resigned earlier that season due to poor results. His first game in charge was a Turkish Cup game against Fenerbahçe which Fener won 2–0. His first League game was a 2–0 win at home to Istanbul. Bursaspor were unbeaten in the league until March when they lost 2–1 away at Galatasaray. For the 18 games that Sağlam was in charge during the 2008–09 season, Bursaspor lost only twice. They picked up 36 points; an average of 2 per game, while also recording a 2–1 victory over Fenerbahçe and a draw with Beşiktaş. The end of the season saw Bursaspor finish in sixth position, missing out on a European place by just three points. Bursaspor also reached the quarter-finals of the Turkish Cup losing 4–1 on aggregate to Fenerbahçe.

==== The league title ====
The following season, 2009–10, began successful and by the midpoint of the season, in December 2009; gameweek 17, the club were sitting in the top spot in the Süper Lig table. The first half of the season saw a 1–0 home victory against Istanbul giants Galatasaray, and also a 2–3 win away at Beşiktaş. In late 2009, Sağlam was linked with the vacant Turkey managerial position after Terim's resignation, but he refused to comment on the speculation. Guus Hiddink eventually took up the position. The latter part of the season saw a 6–0 win over mid–table Istanbul, the largest win in the league to date this season, and also a 2–3 away win against Fenerbahçe after winning from two goals down. Bursaspor again reached the quarter-finals of the Turkish Cup and again they lost on aggregate to Fenerbahçe, this time crashing out 4–3 due to an injury time winner from Fener. In April 2010 Bursa sat at the top of the table after being in the top three for the past few months. With eight games left to play Bursa were five points clear at the top. After securing a win by coming from behind to win 2–1 against Antalyaspor, after having lost the previous week for the first time in eight league games, Sağlam was quoted as saying that:

"We (Bursaspor) are on the verge of becoming a great team, we had to win, even if it meant coming from behind to do so. That was the important thing."

Five weeks before the end of the season, Bursaspor fell to second place in the league. They maintained pressure on Fenerbahçe who had overtaken them. Going into the final game of the season, Bursaspor were just one point behind Fener, and needed to better their results against defending champions Beşiktaş. Knowing that the match against Beşiktaş could prove decisive, Sağlam told FIFA.com:

"I hope we can win the title before then and that it doesn't rest on those final 90 minutes. I hope that doesn't happen."

With Fenerbahçe held to a 1–1 home draw against Trabzonspor, and Bursa beating Beşiktaş 2–1, the Green Crocs were crowned champions, by just a single point. They are only the second club outside the "Istanbul Big Three" who have won the league. Trabzonspor were the other team, who last won in 1983–84. After winning the league, Sağlam said:

"After taking pole position in the league during the course of the season, we believed in our hearts that we could win the title. Despite losing the lead to Fenerbahçe we did not give up hope. We were always waiting to pounce if Fenerbahçe dropped points. Following in Trabzonspor's footsteps, we have brought success back to Anatolia, he added. We have taken this honour. Now we have an even bigger responsibility on our shoulders; representing our country in the UEFA Champions League. We'll try not to let those who supported us down. The whole of Bursa has made history."

==== 2010–11 season onwards ====
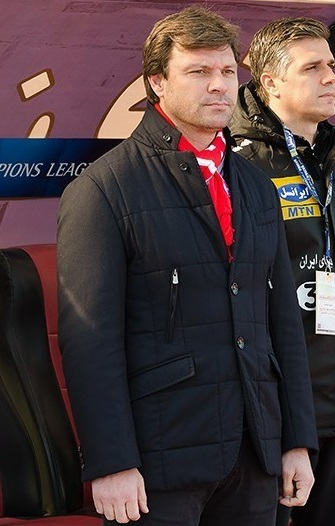
Sağlam coaching Tractor against Paykan at Sahand Stadium, 1 March 2018

Of the recipe to Bursaspor's success he simply said: "We put together a good team and that was the key to our title success." The beginning of the 2010-11 season was successful, with Bursa winning their first six league games and losing only twice during the first half of the season. Their continued success has forced some of the Turkish Press to reconsider the team as a serious title contender and not just a one-hit wonder, and they spent the majority of the [league in either the first or second position. On March 29, 2011, Bursaspor and Saglam agreed to extend the contract with three years until the end of the 2014–15 season. However, Bursaspor finished third that season. After finishing the remaining of his seasons 8th and 4th, he signed a contract with Eskişehirspor. On 5 January 2015, Sağlam resigned as Eskişehirspor manager.

=== Past career ===
At the beginning of the season, Sağlam terminated his contract with Yeni Malatyaspor and signed a contract with Iranian side Tractor, a club based in Tabriz.

On 15 November 2019, Samsunspor announced that Sağlam would be returning to manage the club.

On 12 May 2024, Sağlam was appointed as the head coach of Kocaelispor for the second time, signing a 1.5 + 1-year contract with the club. On 20 December 2024, he announced that he had resigned from his position at the club.

== Career statistics ==
=== Club ===
Appearances and goals by club, season and competition
| Club | Season | League | | Cup (Note: Includes Türkiye Kupası, Atatürk Kupası, Başbakanlık Kupası, Cumhurbaşkanlığı Kupası and TSYD Kupası) | | Europe (Note: Includes European Cup, UEFA Cup, UEFA Cup Winners' Cup,) | | Total | |
| Club | Season | Apps | Goals | Apps | Goals | Apps | Goals | Apps | Goals |
|---|---|---|---|---|---|---|---|---|---|
| Samsunspor | 1989–90 | 29 | 4 | 3 | - | - | - | 32 | 4 |
| Samsunspor | 1990–91 | 29 | 6 | 4 | 1 | - | - | 33 | 5 |
| Samsunspor | 1991–92 | 28 | 2 | 4 | 1 | - | - | 32 | 3 |
| Samsunspor | 1992–93 | 36 | 14 | 5 | 5 | - | - | 41 | 19 |
| Samsunspor | 1992–93 | 29 | 17 | 2 | 3 | - | - | 31 | 20 |
| Samsunspor | Total | 122 | 39 | 12 | 8 | 0 | 0 | 134 | 47 |
| Beşiktaş | 1994–95 | 30 | 22 | 2 | 1 | 3 | 2 | 35 | 25 |
| Beşiktaş | 1995–96 | 30 | 18 | 3 | 2 | 1 | 0 | 34 | 20 |
| Beşiktaş | 1996–97 | 27 | 19 | 4 | 0 | 7 | 2 | 28 | 21 |
| Beşiktaş | 1997–98 | 30 | 5 | 9 | 5 | 5 | 1 | 44 | 12 |
| Beşiktaş | 1998–99 | 25 | 4 | 9 | 5 | 4 | 0 | 38 | 9 |
| Beşiktaş | 1999–00 | 25 | 14 | 1 | 0 | 2 | 0 | 28 | 14 |
| Beşiktaş | Total | 167 | 82 | 28 | 13 | 22 | 5 | 217 | 101 |
| Samsunspor | 2000–01 | 25 | 8 | - | - | - | - | 25 | 8 |
| Samsunspor | 2001–02 | 31 | 10 | 2 | 2 | - | - | 33 | 12 |
| Samsunspor | 2002–03 | 20 | 3 | 2 | 0 | - | - | 22 | 3 |
| Samsunspor | Total | 76 | 21 | 4 | 2 | 0 | 0 | 80 | 23 |
| Career totals | | 365 | 134 | 44 | 23 | 22 | 5 | 431 | 169 |

=== International ===
Appearances and goals by national team and year
| National team | Year | Apps | Goals |
|---|---|---|---|
Turkey
| Turkey | 1993 | 2 | 2 |
| Turkey | 1994 | 5 | 1 |
| Turkey | 1995 | 9 | 3 |
| Turkey | 1996 | 5 | 3 |
| Turkey | 1997 | 2 | 0 |
| Total | | 23 | 9 |

Scores and results list Turkey's goal tally first, score column indicates score after each Sağlam goal.

List of international goals scored by Ertuğrul Sağlam
| No. | Date | Venue | Opponent | Score | Result | Competition |
|---|---|---|---|---|---|---|
| 1 | 10 November 1993 | Fenerbahçe Stadium, Istanbul, Turkey | Norway | 1–0 | 2–1 | 1994 FIFA World Cup qualification |
| 2 | 10 November 1993 | Fenerbahçe Stadium, Istanbul, Turkey | Norway | 2–1 | 2–1 | 1994 FIFA World Cup qualification |
| 3 | 23 February 1994 | İnönü Stadium, Istanbul, Turkey | Czech Republic | 1–0 | 1–4 | Friendly |
| 4 | 5 June 1995 | Varsity Stadium, Toronto, Canada | Canada | 3–1 | 3–1 | Friendly |
| 5 | 7 June 1995 | Claude-Robillard, Montreal, Canada | Canada | 3–0 | 3–0 | Friendly |
| 6 | 20 June 1995 | Estadio Municipal, Coquimbo, Chile | New Zealand | 1–1 | 2–1 | Copa Centenario del Fútbol Chileno |
| 7 | 20 June 1995 | Estadio Municipal, Coquimbo, Chile | New Zealand | 2–1 | 2–1 | Copa Centenario del Fútbol Chileno |
| 8 | 15 November 1995 | Råsunda Stadium, Stockholm, Sweden | Sweden | 2–2 | 2–2 | UEFA Euro 1996 qualifying |
| 9 | 14 February 1996 | İzmir Atatürk Stadium, İzmir, Turkey | Belarus | 1–0 | 3–2 | Friendly |
| 10 | 14 February 1996 | İzmir Atatürk Stadium, İzmir, Turkey | Belarus | 2–0 | 3–2 | Friendly |
| 11 | 10 November 1996 | Ali Sami Yen Stadium, Istanbul, Turkey | San Marino | 7–0 | 7–0 | 1998 FIFA World Cup qualification |

== Managerial statistics ==
As of 22 December 2024

Managerial record by team and tenure
| Team | Nat | From | To | Record | | | | |
| Team | Nat | From | To | G | W | D | L | Win % |
|---|---|---|---|---|---|---|---|---|
| Samsunspor | (Turkey) | 1 July 2004 | 30 June 2005 | 36 | 11 | 8 | 17 | 30.56 |
| Kayserispor | (Turkey) | 28 July 2005 | 30 June 2007 | 87 | 40 | 22 | 25 | 45.98 |
| Beşiktaş | (Turkey) | 6 July 2007 | 14 October 2008 | 61 | 38 | 8 | 15 | 62.30 |
| Bursaspor | (Turkey) | 2 January 2009 | 5 February 2013 | 185 | 90 | 45 | 50 | 48.65 |
| Eskişehirspor | (Turkey) | 3 July 2013 | 5 January 2015 | 68 | 25 | 20 | 23 | 36.76 |
| Bursaspor | (Turkey) | 15 June 2015 | 30 November 2015 | 14 | 5 | 0 | 9 | 35.71 |
| Yeni Malatyaspor | (Turkey) | 14 July 2017 | 14 September 2017 | 4 | 1 | 1 | 2 | 25.00 |
| Tractor | (Iran) | 19 January 2018 | 30 April 2018 | 16 | 3 | 6 | 7 | 18.75 |
| Kayserispor | (Turkey) | 16 May 2018 | 2 December 2018 | 16 | 4 | 3 | 9 | 25.00 |
| Samsunspor | (Turkey) | 15 November 2019 | 2 June 2021 | 48 | 29 | 11 | 8 | 60.42 |
| Tractor | (Iran) | 28 February 2022 | 9 June 2022 | 11 | 4 | 4 | 3 | 36.36 |
| Kocaelispor | (Turkey) | 17 June 2023 | 19 February 2024 | 24 | 13 | 4 | 7 | 54.17 |
| Kocaelispor | (Turkey) | 12 May 2024 | 20 December 2024 | 18 | 11 | 2 | 5 | 61.11 |
| Total | | | | 588 | 274 | 134 | 180 | 46.60 |

== Honours ==
=== Player ===
Samsunspor

- 1. Lig: 1990–91, 1992–93
- Balkans Cup: 1993–94

Beşiktaş

- Süper Lig: 1994–95
- Türkiye Kupası: 1997–98
- Süper Kupa: 1994, 1998
- TSYD Kupası: 1996
- Atatürk Kupası: 2000

=== Managerial ===
Kayserispor

- UEFA Intertoto Cup: 2006

Bursaspor

- Süper Lig: 2009–10
