= Ozan İpek =

Turkish footballer

Personal information
- Full name: Ozan İpek
- Date of birth: 10 October 1986 (age 40)
- Place of birth: Ankara, Turkey
- Height: 1.80 m (5 ft 11 in)
- Position: Left winger

Youth career
- Batman Petrolspor

Senior career*
Years	Team	Apps	(Gls)
2004–2006	Batman Petrolspor	63	(17)
2006–2008	Kahramanmaraşspor	43	(5)
2008	Bucaspor	18	(10)
2009–2015	Bursaspor	114	(16)
2013–2014	→ Mersin İdmanyurdu (loan)	4	(0)
2015–2016	Antalyaspor	1	(0)
2016–2017	Adana Demirspor	13	(0)
2018	24 Erzincanspor	5	(0)

International career
2010	Turkey	3	(0)
- * Club domestic league appearances and goals as of 19 March 2018

Ozan İpek (born 10 October 1986) is a Turkish professional footballer, who most recently played as a left winger for Turkish club Erzincanspor.

He began his professional career at Batman Petrolspor in the Turkish second tier. In 2007, he was transferred to Kahramanmaraşspor. Next season he was loaned to Bucaspor. During his spell at Bucaspor, he registered 10 goals and 10 assists. With this performance, he drew attention from Turkish Süper Lig clubs.

In February 2009, he was transferred to Süper Lig side Bursaspor. Bursaspor finished 2009-10 season in the first place and became champions for the first time in the club's history. Ozan İpek contributed with 8 goals and 5 assists. This included a goal and an assist against Beşiktaş and 2 goals and 1 assist against Fenerbahçe, which gave Bursaspor 2–3 victory away at both matches.

In October 2012, he was left out of the squad by Ertuğrul Sağlam due to indiscipline. In January 2013, he was loaned to Mersin İdman Yurdu until the end of the season.

== International career ==
Having spent the majority of his playing career in the lower divisions, Ozan İpek never represented Turkey at youth level. However, his impressive form for his club in the 2009-10 season, where he scored 8 goals as a midfielder and helped Bursaspor to win the title, saw him called up for national duty. He made his international debut at the age of 23, on 3 March 2010, in a 2–0 friendly win against Honduras, coming on as a 62nd-minute substitute for Arda Turan.

== Honours ==
- Bursaspor
  - Süper Lig (1): 2009–2010
