= Bursa Atatürk Stadium =

Turkish football stadium

Coordinates: 40°11′33.53″N 29°02′55.52″E

Bursa Atatürk Stadium.
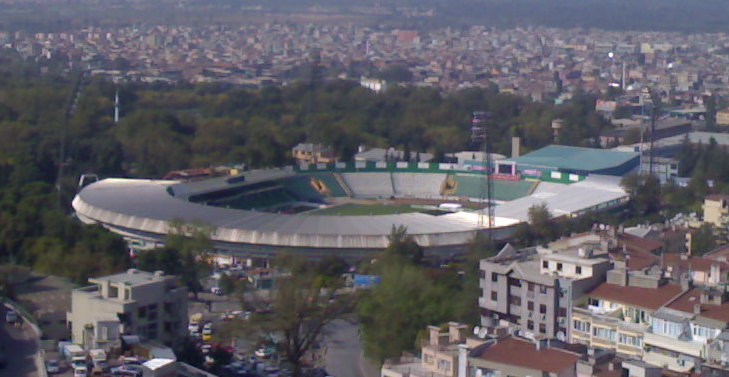
- Interactive map of Bursa Atatürk Stadium.
- Location: Bursa, Turkey
- Owner: Bursaspor
- Capacity: 25,213
- Surface: Grass

Construction
- Opened: 1950
- Renovated: 2010
- Closed: 2015
- Demolished: 2016

Bursa Atatürk Stadium (Turkish: Bursa Atatürk Stadyumu) was a multi-purpose stadium in Bursa, Turkey. It was used mostly for football matches and was the home ground of Bursaspor. The stadium held 25,213 and was built in 1979. A stadium had existed on this site since 1930 when a stand with a capacity of 300 was built for an amateur football club. The stadium was demolished in 2016.

== History ==
The stadium was given an extensive refurbishment after Bursaspor's Championship winning season 2009–10 to make it fit for UEFA regulations and participation for the 2010-11 UEFA Champions League. The capacity, which was originally 18,517 was increased to 25,213 as well as exterior upgrades taking place.

It was one of the nine candidate host stadiums of Turkish failed bid for UEFA Euro 2016, after reconstruction.

== New stadium ==
The Bursa Metropolitan Stadium, also known as the Timsah Arena (English: Crocodile Arena), was built by Bursa City Council to replace the Bursa Atatürk Stadium. The stadium's project was introduced to the Turkish press on July 10, 2009.

The new stadium was built between 2011-2015 and opened in December 2015 with a seating capacity for 43,761 spectators and a fully covered roof. After the new stadium opened, the Bursa Atatürk Stadium was demolished in 2016.

== Architectural form ==
Hexagonal figures found in the green mosque of Bursa as part of the historical Islamic art deduced the structure of the roof structure. The transformation into a significant architectural frame is the basic idea for the New Bursa Stadium. The smooth transition from the stadium roof into a tree roof makes the stadium naturally situated. The arena is not only a stadium – is marks a meeting point for the locals in the heart of the city.

The VIP, Sponsor hospitality and media areas were situated in the west stand at the park side of the stadium. A multifunctional use was designated and contained different events in the stadium bowl.

The compact design of the main stand building, the shadowing of internal areas by the extended roof (reduced air condition/passive ventilation) joined by natural daylight due to the translucent roof cover, use of grey water (water conservation/rainwater; 50%+ reduction of potable water use), permanent local gas cogeneration (usually 30% higher energy efficiency than general power grid) and roof integrated solar panels not only reduced the energy necessity of the stadium but contain also the chance for the stadium operator to supply the neighbourhood with excessive power. Furthermore, according to the building sustainability long-life recyclable materials produced with a minimized energy input wer applied as far as possible.
