= Sercan Yıldırım =

Turkish footballer (born 1990)

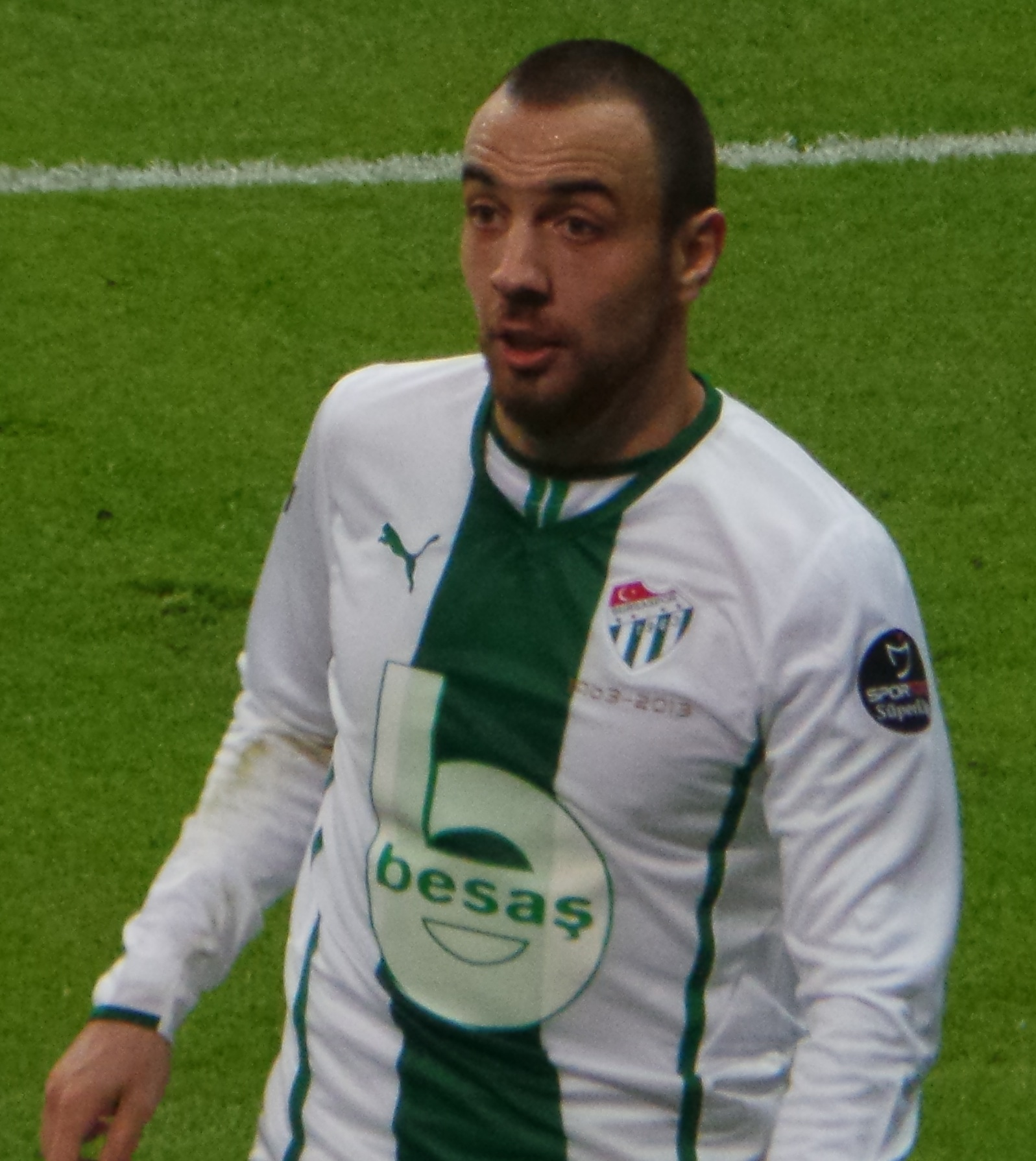
- Yıldırım playing for Bursaspor in 2014

Personal information
- Date of birth: 5 April 1990 (age 36)
- Place of birth: Osmangazi, Bursa, Turkey
- Height: 1.82 m (6 ft 0 in)
- Position: Forward

Youth career
- 2004–2007: Bursaspor

Senior career*
| Years | Team | Apps | (Gls) |
| 2007–2011 | Bursaspor | 84 | (23) |
| 2011–2016 | Galatasaray | 22 | (2) |
| 2013 | → Sivasspor (loan) | 5 | (0) |
| 2013 | → Şanlıurfaspor (loan) | 13 | (3) |
| 2014 | → Bursaspor (loan) | 11 | (1) |
| 2014–2015 | → Balıkesirspor (loan) | 31 | (8) |
| 2015–2016 | → Bursaspor (loan) | 19 | (4) |
| 2016–2019 | Bursaspor | 23 | (2) |
| 2019 | Giresunspor | 0 | (0) |
| 2019 | Fatih Karagümrük | 1 | (0) |
| Total | | 209 | (43) |

International career
| 2005 | Turkey U15 | 3 | (1) |
| 2006 | Turkey U16 | 10 | (12) |
| 2005–2007 | Turkey U17 | 12 | (4) |
| 2007–2008 | Turkey U18 | 8 | (4) |
| 2007–2009 | Turkey U19 | 17 | (9) |
| 2008–2009 | Turkey U21 | 4 | (1) |
| 2012 | Turkey U23 | 1 | (2) |
| 2009–2010 | Turkey | 10 | (2) |
- * Club domestic league appearances and goals as of 16:44, 23 September 2019 (UTC)

Sercan Yıldırım (Turkish pronunciation: [ˈseɾdʒan ˈjɯɫdɯˈɾɯm]; born 5 April 1990) is a Turkish former football player who played as a forward.

== Club career ==
=== Bursaspor ===
Yıldırım started his career at Bursaspor. He broke into the first team in the 2007–2008 season, making his league debut as a second-half substitute in a 1–0 away defeat at Istanbul B.B in September 2007. He scored his first senior goal for the club three games later in a 2–0 win at Kasımpaşa. His first season saw him only featured eight times for the senior team. The 2008–09 season saw him score four goals in many games getting a brace against both Gençlerbirliği in the second game of the season and also against Kocaelispor two games later. He also got on the scoresheet against Galatasaray in October 2008. In March 2011, he was close to signing a 4-year contract with the Russian side Lokomotiv Moscow, but he failed his physical due to knee problems and Lokomotiv decided not to sign him.

=== Galatasaray ===
On 5 September 2011, after days of negotiation, Bursaspor finally agreed on a price with Galatasaray for Sercan. He agreed on a five-year deal (until the 2015–16 season) with Turkish club. In addition to the transfer of Musa Çağıran, the club paid an additional €3 million to Bursaspor. He gave an assist to Johan Elmander with his backheel on 9 September 2011 in a game between Galatasaray and Samsunspor which Galatasaray won 3-1 He scored his first goal for Galatasaray on 7 January 2012 in a game between Galatasaray and Samsunspor which Galatasaray won 4–2.

On 23 September 2012 Galatasaray's Coach Fatih Terim allow Sercan to play in the first Eleven. Due to the Injuries of both main strikers Umut Bulut and Johan Elmander. He started the new season in the Süper Lig with a Goal in a 3–0 home win against the newcomers Akhisar Belediyespor.

=== Loan to Şanlıurfaspor ===
On 30 July 2013, Galatasaray announced that they have reached an agreement with Şanlıurfaspor to loan Sercan to the team for the 2013–14 season, for a fee of €150,000.

=== Loan to Bursaspor ===
On 13 August 2015, Yıldırım agreed with Turkish club Bursaspor for one year.

=== Fatih Karagümrük ===
Ahead of the 2019/20 season, Yıldırım joined Fatih Karagümrük.

== International career ==
Yıldırım has played at every age group for the Turkish Youth International Team. Whilst playing for the Under-16 level during 2006, he scored 12 goals in 10 games, including a hattrick and three braces. He currently has four caps for the senior squad. He received his first call up to the Turkish senior squad by Fatih Terim in March 2009, for two 2010 World Cup Qualifying games against Spain, however he was an unused substitute. He made his debut for Turkey in a friendly against Azerbaijan on 2 June 2009, coming on as a second-half substitute for Tuncay. On 12 August 2009, in a friendly against Ukraine, he registered 2 assists in Turkey's 3–0 win. He scored his first goal for Turkey on 5 September 2009 in Turkey's World Cup qualification game against Estonia.

== Career statistics ==
=== Club ===
As of 26 April 2015

| Club | Season | League | | Cup | | League Cup | | Europe | | Total | |
| Club | Season | Apps | Goals | Apps | Goals | Apps | Goals | Apps | Goals | Apps | Goals |
|---|---|---|---|---|---|---|---|---|---|---|---|
| Bursaspor | 2007–08 | 8 | 1 | 5 | 0 | — | | — | | 13 | 1 |
| Bursaspor | 2008–09 | 30 | 11 | 5 | 3 | — | | — | | 35 | 14 |
| Bursaspor | 2009–10 | 24 | 4 | 6 | 3 | 1 | 0 | — | | 31 | 7 |
| Bursaspor | 2010–11 | 22 | 7 | 3 | 0 | — | | 6 | 1 | 31 | 8 |
| Bursaspor | 2011–12 | 0 | 0 | 0 | 0 | — | | 3 | 0 | 3 | 0 |
| Bursaspor | Total | 84 | 23 | 19 | 6 | 1 | 0 | 9 | 1 | 113 | 30 |
| Galatasaray | 2011–12 | 19 | 1 | 2 | 2 | 0 | 0 | — | | 21 | 3 |
| Galatasaray | 2012–13 | 3 | 1 | 2 | 1 | 0 | 0 | 0 | 0 | 5 | 2 |
| Galatasaray | Total | 22 | 2 | 4 | 3 | 0 | 0 | 0 | 0 | 26 | 5 |
| Sivasspor (loan) | 2012–13 | 5 | 0 | 5 | 2 | — | | — | | 10 | 2 |
| Sivasspor (loan) | Total | 5 | 0 | 5 | 2 | — | | — | | 10 | 2 |
| Şanlıurfaspor (loan) | 2013–14 | 13 | 3 | 1 | 0 | — | | — | | 14 | 3 |
| Şanlıurfaspor (loan) | Total | 13 | 3 | 1 | 0 | — | | — | | 14 | 3 |
| Bursaspor (loan) | 2013–14 | 11 | 1 | 3 | 0 | — | | — | | 14 | 1 |
| Bursaspor (loan) | Total | 11 | 1 | 3 | 0 | — | | — | | 14 | 1 |
| Balıkesirspor (loan) | 2014–15 | 26 | 6 | 0 | 0 | — | | — | | 31 | 8 |
| Balıkesirspor (loan) | Total | 26 | 6 | 0 | 0 | — | | — | | 26 | 6 |
| Career total | | 160 | 35 | 32 | 11 | 1 | 0 | 9 | 1 | 203 | 47 |

=== International ===
Turkey national team
| Year | Apps | Goals |
|---|---|---|
| 2009 | 5 | 1 |
| 2010 | 5 | 1 |
| Total | 10 | 2 |

=== International goals ===
| # | Date | Venue | Opponent | Score | Result | Competition |
|---|---|---|---|---|---|---|
| 1. | 5 September 2009 | Kadir Has Stadium, Kayseri, Turkey | Estonia | 2–1 | 4–2 | 2010 FIFA World Cup qualification |
| 2. | 26 May 2010 | Veterans Stadium, New Britain, Connecticut | Northern Ireland | 1–0 | 2–0 | Friendly |

== Honours ==
=== Club ===
Bursaspor

- Süper Lig (1): 2009–10

Galatasaray

- Süper Lig (1): 2011–12
- Süper Kupa (1): 2012

=== Individual ===
- First Turkish footballer in Bursaspor history to score in the Champions League.
- Bursaspor top scorer in the Süper Lig, and in all competitions: 2008–09
