= Bursaspor =

Turkish sports club

- Full name: Bursaspor Kulübü Derneği
- Nickname: Yeşil Timsahlar (The Green Crocodiles)
- Founded: 1 June 1963; 63 years ago
- Stadium: Centennial Atatürk Stadium
- Capacity: 43,361
- Coordinates: 40°12′39″N 29°00′34″E
- President: Enes Çelik
- Head coach: Mustafa Er
- League: TFF 1. Lig
- 2025–26: TFF 2. Lig, Red, 1st of 18 (promoted)
- Website: bursaspor.org.tr
| Home colours | Away colours | Third colours |

Bursaspor Kulübü Derneği, commonly known as Bursaspor, is a Turkish professional sports club based in the city of Bursa that plays in the TFF First League, the second tier of the Turkish football league system. Founded in 1963, the club has a rich history in Turkish football. Bursaspor's traditional colors are green and white, and the team's home kits typically feature these colors in a striped pattern. The club has played its home matches at the Bursa Centennial Atatürk Stadium since 2015.

Bursaspor claimed its first-ever Süper Lig championship in the 2009–10 Süper Lig with 75 points, beating runner-up Fenerbahçe by just one point. Bursaspor became the second Süper Lig champion not from Istanbul after Trabzonspor victory in 1975–76 season. This championship brought an end to the era when the "Big Three" teams of Istanbul dominated the Süper Lig competition.

In domestic cup competitions, Bursaspor has also enjoyed notable success. The club has won the Turkish Cup once (1986), finished runners-up on multiple occasions, and has claimed the Prime Minister's Cup twice. In addition, Bursaspor has twice won promotion from the TFF First League (second tier), and has a strong tradition of youth development, having produced several prominent Turkish players over the decades.

Bursaspor's first, and most successful, foray into European competition came in the 1974–75 European Cup Winners’ Cup, where the team reached the quarter-finals. They also participated in the 1986–87 UEFA Cup, the 1995 UEFA Intertoto Cup, and the 2010–11 UEFA Champions League, where they played in the group stages against Manchester United, Valencia, and Rangers. While they finished bottom of their group, qualifying for the Champions League was a historic achievement for the club and its supporters.

== History ==
=== Foundation and early years ===
Bursaspor were founded on 1 June 1963 after the merger of five local İzmit–Bursa-region clubs: Acar İdman Yurdu, Akınspor, İstiklal, Pınarspor and Çelikspor. The new entity adopted the name “Bursaspor”, while the colours green and white drawn from the Bursa city flag and long used by the local game were chosen as the official palette for all branches of the club.

The club were registered with the Turkish Football Federation for the 1963–64 season in the second tier, and played their first official match on 21 September 1963 against İzmir Demirspor at İzmir Alsancak Stadium an occasion reported locally as the symbolic beginning of “Green-Whites” football at national level.

Rapid consolidation followed. In 1966–67 Bursaspor won promotion to the top flight after a dominant campaign in the second tier, winning 19 of 30 league matches and finishing eight points clear of runners-up Samsunspor; the Green-Whites’ balanced goal difference and strong spring sequence were singled out in the contemporary press as decisive. Their early years in the top division featured solid mid-table finishes and a growing matchday culture at Bursa Atatürk Stadium, which quickly became known for compact, high-energy crowds.

Bursaspor's first national silverware arrived in 1971 when they defeated Fenerbahçe 1–0 after extra time to win the Prime Minister's Cup regarded at the time as a showpiece between the country's leading clubs and a key milestone for “Anadolu” teams. In 1973–74 Bursaspor reached the Turkish Cup final and thereby qualified for the 1974–75 European Cup Winners’ Cup; they eliminated Finn Harps and Dundee United en route to the quarter-finals before bowing out to Dynamo Kyiv, gaining valuable continental experience in the club's first extended European run.

The club's first and to date only Turkish Cup triumph came in 1986, defeating Altay 2–0 in the Ankara final; the victory prompted a civic celebration in Bursa and qualified Bursaspor for the 1986–87 Cup Winners’ Cup, where they were eliminated in the first round by Ajax, who went on to win the tournament.

A turbulent spell in the mid-1980s saw the Green-Whites relegated at the end of both the 1985–86 and 1986–87 campaigns, though the latter demotion was subsequently overturned by a Council of State ruling in 1987 after disciplinary and procedural appeals. Further instability ultimately led to relegation again in 2004. The rebuild that followed culminated in Bursaspor winning the second-tier title in 2005–06 and returning to the Süper Lig on 16 May 2006 a promotion widely seen as the foundation for the modern era that would, four years later, bring the club its historic national championship.

=== Historic First League Triumph (2009–10) ===
Promoted in 2006 and rebuilt under head coach Ertuğrul Sağlam, Bursaspor began the 2009–10 campaign fast and reached the summit by December. A 1–0 home win against Galatasaray and a 2–3 victory away at Beşiktaş set the tone for a side that mixed intense pressing with rapid transitions led by playmaker Pablo Batalla and winger Ozan İpek.

The team's most emphatic result came in spring with a 6–0 defeat of İstanbul BB, while league leaders Fenerbahçe were simultaneously held in critical fixtures, trimming the gap at the top. Bursaspor again reached the Turkish Cup quarter-finals, but attention increasingly focused on the league, where Batalla's control between the lines and İpek's direct running supplied a season-high xG and chance-creation rate for the club in the Opta era.

With eight games left Bursaspor were five points clear; then a blip allowed Fenerbahçe to edge ahead with five weeks to go. The title race therefore went to the final day on 16 May 2010. In Bursa, Sağlam's side beat Beşiktaş 2–1 thanks to second-half goals—securing the points they needed irrespective of events in Istanbul—while at the Şükrü Saracoğlu Stadium Fenerbahçe could only draw 1–1 with Trabzonspor, a result confirmed over the public-address system that triggered premature celebrations and then pitch invasions as news filtered through that Bursaspor were champions by a single point (75 to 74).

The championship was historic on several counts. Bursaspor became only the sixth club ever to win the Süper Lig and the first team outside Istanbul to do so since Trabzonspor in 1983–84, ending more than a quarter-century of dominance by the “Big Three”. Sağlam, who had taken the job after a difficult spell at Beşiktaş, was widely praised for blending academy products (Sercan Yıldırım, Volkan Şen) with shrewd signings (İbrahim Öztürk, Zafer Yelen and others) and for installing a compact 4-2-3-1 that could morph into a front-foot 4-4-2 in transitions.

As champions, Bursaspor qualified directly for the 2010–11 UEFA Champions League group stage—a club first—and were drawn with Manchester United, Valencia and Rangers. Although outmatched, they registered landmark nights: their first Champions League goal against Valencia and a closing-day 1–1 draw with Rangers in Bursa to claim their maiden point in the competition. When Bursaspor visited Ibrox earlier in the campaign they wore an all-white strip rather than their traditional green to avoid stoking tensions because of Rangers’ rivalry with green-clad Celtic.

Bursaspor finished the league with 75 points (W23-D6-L5), one clear of Fenerbahçe, and the division's best defensive record. Batalla and İpek led the club scoring charts with eight league goals apiece, while Ivan Ergić and Bekir Ozan Has anchored midfield in front of a back line marshalled by Ömer Erdoğan. The club's fan base, the Teksas and Bursasporluyuz groups, were credited with turning the Bursa Atatürk Stadium into one of the league's most intimidating venues during the run-in.

Key figures: Ertuğrul Sağlam (head coach); Pablo Batalla, Ozan İpek, Ömer Erdoğan, İbrahim Öztürk, Bekir Ozan Has, Volkan Şen, Sercan Yıldırım.

=== Years of Relegation and Recovery Attempts ===
In the following years, Bursaspor remained a competitive mid-table side in the Süper Lig, occasionally challenging for European spots. They reached the Turkish Cup final in 2012, but were defeated by Fenerbahçe. The club again made it to the final in 2015, this time facing Galatasaray, but once more finished as runners-up. Despite these cup runs and finishing mid-table or just outside European qualification places for several seasons, the club gradually began to decline due to mismanagement, frequent managerial changes, and growing financial instability.

By the late 2010s, Bursaspor was struggling significantly. Mounting debts and administrative turmoil led to a deterioration of on-field performance. In the 2018–19 Süper Lig season, the club was relegated on the final day, ending their 13-year stay in the top flight. This marked the first relegation since their return to the Süper Lig in 2006.

Bursaspor competed in the TFF First League (second division) for three consecutive seasons but failed to mount a serious promotion challenge. Continued financial issues and instability — including transfer bans and unpaid player wages — plagued the club. As a result, they were relegated again, this time to the TFF Second League (third tier), at the end of the 2021–22 season.

Off the pitch, the club was increasingly constrained by its debt burden and administrative sanctions. They were banned from signing new players due to unpaid debts and faced growing unrest among supporters and former players.

The situation worsened, and on April 7, 2024, Bursaspor suffered a 1–2 home defeat against 1461 Trabzon FK, mathematically confirming their relegation to the TFF Third League — the fourth tier of Turkish football — for the first time in the club's history. The fall from national champions to the fourth division in just 14 years marked one of the steepest declines in Turkish football history. However, in the 2024–25 season, the club managed a strong campaign in the Third League, finishing first in their group with 21 wins out of 30 matches and earning promotion back to the TFF Second League for the 2025–26 season, giving hope to fans for a potential long-term recovery. After the 2025-26 season, they finished the TFF Second League in first place. The team now competes in TFF First League, the second tier of Turkish football in the 2026-27 season.

== Colours and badge ==
Bursaspor's club badge prominently features the club name, foundation year (1963), and the crescent moon and star from the Turkish flag, symbolizing national pride. Surrounding the badge are five stars, each in a different color: black, red, yellow, green, and navy blue. These stars pay tribute to the five local amateur clubs that merged to form Bursaspor: Acar İdman Yurdu (black), Akınspor (red), İstiklal (yellow), Pınarspor (green), and Çelikspor (navy blue). This fusion of identities reflects Bursaspor's community roots and diversity.

The shield-shaped emblem also includes green and white stripes, representing the club's official colors. These colors were chosen during the club's foundation to symbolize hope (green) and purity (white).

The club's traditional home kit consists of green shirts with white trim, green shorts, and green socks. The away kit generally features green and white hooped shirts, white shorts, and green-and-white hooped socks. The alternate or third kits have historically varied in color, but in recent years, designs have included amber shirts with black trim, claret shorts, and amber socks, or occasionally darker green or all-white combinations for contrast during specific matches. In special anniversary seasons, Bursaspor has also released retro kits and commemorative badges that echo designs from earlier eras, preserving the club's legacy visually.

== Stadium ==
Bursaspor plays its home matches at the Centennial Atatürk Stadium, located in the city of Bursa. Officially opened in 2015, the stadium has a seating capacity of 43,361 and is known for its unique crocodile-shaped design, a nod to the club's mascot and nickname “Yeşil Timsahlar” (The Green Crocodiles). The stadium features modern facilities and was built to meet UEFA standards. The pitch measures 105 by 68 meters and is covered with natural grass.

The stadium has hosted domestic league matches, Turkish Cup fixtures, and various national events. It replaced the historic Bursa Atatürk Stadium, where the club had played from 1979 until 2015. The previous stadium was demolished to make way for new urban development, and the club transitioned to its new home with the aim of building a stronger commercial and fan experience.

== Supporters ==
Bursaspor is known for having a loyal fan base in Turkish football. The main supporter group is called Teksas, named after the western U.S. state of Texas. The group has been active since the 1960s and is based in the Maraton Stand of Centennial Atatürk Stadium. Over the decades, Teksas has become a well known ultra group in Turkey, known for choreographed displays, loud chanting, creative banners, and loyalty.

Another notable supporter group is Legend Teksas, a name sometimes used to refer to older generations or particularly influential fan leaders. Bursaspor supporters are deeply integrated into the club's identity, often participating in community events, youth development activities, and club-organized initiatives. The fan base is well known for traveling in large numbers for away games and for its strong presence on social media platforms.

Tensions have occasionally flared with rival fans, especially during local derbies, but Bursaspor's fans are also respected nationally for their dedication and resilience — especially during periods of financial hardship and relegation to lower leagues. Despite the club's recent struggles, Bursaspor continues to enjoy strong support at home matches.

=== Relationship with Ankaragücü ===
Bursaspor also shares a long-standing friendship with Ankaragücü supporters. The relationship began in the early 1990s after a prominent Teksas leader, Abdulkerim Bayraktar, who had moved to Ankara for school, began attending Ankaragücü matches. After his tragic death during military service in 1993, the two fan bases united in solidarity. An emotional tribute during a match and ongoing mutual respect have solidified this bond.

Since then, Bursaspor fans chant Ankaragücü's name in the 6th minute of home games, while Ankaragücü fans return the gesture in the 16th minute, symbolizing the respective city codes of Ankara (06) and Bursa (16). The tradition of fans sitting together during matches between the two clubs continues today, representing one of the few examples of organized supporter solidarity in Turkish football.

== Rivalries ==
=== Bursaspor vs Beşiktaş ===
Bursaspor has a long-standing and intense rivalry with Beşiktaş, one of Istanbul’s "Big Three" football clubs. The tension between the two clubs dates back several decades but intensified particularly in the 2000s. Matches between Bursaspor and Beşiktaş are known for their high intensity both on and off the pitch, with hostile atmospheres and occasional incidents in the stands. One of the most notable events occurred in May 2011, when violent clashes broke out before a Süper Lig match between the two clubs, resulting in several injuries and leading to the game being postponed.

The rivalry is rooted not only in sporting competitiveness but also in regional and cultural differences, as well as disputes involving fan behavior and accusations of disrespect. Bursaspor fans have often perceived themselves as marginalized by the Istanbul-based football elite, and Beşiktaş has been one of the main targets of that resentment. Despite disciplinary actions and efforts by authorities to ease the tension, the rivalry remains one of the fiercest in Turkish football. Due to security concerns, away fans have sometimes been banned from attending these fixtures.

=== Other Rivalries ===
Bursaspor also shares competitive rivalries with other major Turkish clubs including Galatasaray and Fenerbahçe. While these rivalries are generally less hostile than that with Beşiktaş, matches against the traditional Istanbul powerhouses are always seen as high-stakes encounters by Bursaspor fans, often drawing large crowds and passionate support.

Another significant rivalry is with Eskişehirspor, primarily based on geographic proximity and frequent clashes in the lower divisions. Matches between these Anatolian clubs are intense and have historical importance. The club also has a unique relationship with Ankaragücü, marked more by friendship than rivalry. The solidarity between the fan groups of both teams has been strong for decades and remains one of the few positive alliances in Turkish football fandom.

== Statistics ==
=== Results of League and Cup Competitions by Season ===
| Season | League table | | | | | | | | | | Turkish Cup | UEFA | Top scorer | |
| Season | League | Pos | P | W | D | L | GF | GA | GD | Pts | Turkish Cup | UEFA | Player | Goals |
|---|---|---|---|---|---|---|---|---|---|---|---|---|---|---|
| 1963–64 | 1. Lig | 8th | 24 | 7 | 8 | 9 | 22 | 26 | −6 | 29 | R3 | DNQ | Hasan Bora | 5 |
| 1964–65 | 1. Lig | 2nd | 30 | 16 | 10 | 4 | 51 | 26 | +25 | 58 | R2 | DNQ | Ersel Altıparmak | 12 |
| 1965–66 | 1. Lig | 3rd | 34 | 22 | 9 | 3 | 57 | 15 | +42 | 75 | QF | DNQ | Ersel Altıparmak | 10 |
| 1966–67 | 1. Lig | 1st↑ | 30 | 19 | 7 | 4 | 44 | 14 | +30 | 64 | R2 | DNQ | Ersel Altıparmak | 15 |
| 1967–68 | Süper Lig | 6th | 32 | 10 | 13 | 9 | 37 | 33 | +4 | 43 | R2 | DNQ | Mesut Şen | 8 |
| 1968–69 | Süper Lig | 5th | 30 | 12 | 8 | 10 | 32 | 28 | +4 | 44 | SF | DNQ | Ersel Altıparmak | 8 |
| 1969–70 | Süper Lig | 7th | 30 | 10 | 10 | 10 | 26 | 20 | +6 | 40 | R2 | DNQ | Vahit Kolukısa | 8 |
| 1970–71 | Süper Lig | 5th | 30 | 11 | 12 | 7 | 25 | 25 | +0 | 45 | RU | DNQ | Sinan Bür | 7 |
| 1971–72 | Süper Lig | 6th | 30 | 12 | 8 | 10 | 29 | 24 | +5 | 44 | SF | DNQ | Haluk Erdemoğlu | 7 |
| 1972–73 | Süper Lig | 10th | 30 | 6 | 16 | 8 | 27 | 29 | −2 | 34 | QF | DNQ | Vahit Kolukısa | 5 |
| 1973–74 | Süper Lig | 9th | 30 | 8 | 12 | 10 | 19 | 25 | −6 | 36 | RU | DNQ | Tezcan Ozan | 8 |
| 1974–75 | Süper Lig | 13th | 30 | 6 | 13 | 11 | 20 | 27 | −7 | 31 | SF | QF | Ali Kahraman | 4 |
| 1975–76 | Süper Lig | 10th | 30 | 9 | 9 | 12 | 30 | 33 | −3 | 36 | R3 | DNQ | Tacettin Ergürsel | 8 |
| 1976–77 | Süper Lig | 6th | 30 | 10 | 11 | 9 | 34 | 30 | +4 | 41 | R3 | DNQ | Tacettin Ergürsel | 14 |
| 1977–78 | Süper Lig | 10th | 30 | 9 | 10 | 11 | 26 | 24 | +2 | 37 | SF | DNQ | Orhan Kırıkçılar | 13 |
| 1978–79 | Süper Lig | 12th | 30 | 7 | 13 | 10 | 25 | 33 | −8 | 34 | QF | DNQ | Orhan Kırıkçılar | 5 |
| 1979–80 | Süper Lig | 4th | 30 | 12 | 9 | 9 | 28 | 28 | +0 | 45 | R5 | DNQ | Bahtiyar Yorulmaz | 12 |
| 1980–81 | Süper Lig | 9th | 30 | 12 | 6 | 12 | 30 | 30 | +0 | 42 | SF | DNQ | Ahmet Kılıç | 7 |
| 1981–82 | Süper Lig | 13th | 32 | 11 | 9 | 12 | 25 | 26 | −1 | 42 | SF | DNQ | Sedat Özden | 5 |
| 1982–83 | Süper Lig | 8th | 34 | 11 | 11 | 12 | 36 | 34 | +2 | 44 | R6 | DNQ | Beyhan Çalışkan | 9 |
| 1983–84 | Süper Lig | 10th | 34 | 8 | 15 | 11 | 29 | 33 | −4 | 39 | QF | DNQ | Beyhan Çalışkan | 6 |
| 1984–85 | Süper Lig | 9th | 34 | 9 | 13 | 12 | 39 | 47 | −8 | 40 | R3 | DNQ | Mirsad Sejdic | 14 |
| 1985–86 | Süper Lig | 16th | 36 | 9 | 13 | 14 | 36 | 40 | −4 | 40 | W | DNQ | Gürsel Hattat | 9 |
| 1986–87 | Süper Lig | 17th | 36 | 10 | 8 | 18 | 29 | 40 | −11 | 38 | R6 | R1 | Nejat Biyediç | 4 |
| 1987–88 | Süper Lig | 5th | 38 | 17 | 6 | 15 | 63 | 56 | +7 | 57 | R4 | DNQ | Nejat Biyediç | 17 |
| 1988–89 | Süper Lig | 9th | 36 | 12 | 8 | 16 | 42 | 53 | –11 | 44 | R4 | DNQ | Şenol Ulusavaş | 8 |
| 1989–90 | Süper Lig | 6th | 34 | 13 | 8 | 13 | 46 | 45 | +1 | 47 | SF | DNQ | Nejat Biyediç | 14 |
| 1990–91 | Süper Lig | 8th | 30 | 11 | 5 | 14 | 31 | 36 | –5 | 38 | R6 | DNQ | Erhan Kiremitçi | 13 |
| 1991–92 | Süper Lig | 6th | 30 | 10 | 10 | 10 | 44 | 43 | +1 | 40 | RU | DNQ | Hakan Şükür | 7 |
| 1992–93 | Süper Lig | 6th | 30 | 12 | 6 | 12 | 42 | 42 | +0 | 42 | QF | DNQ | Ali Nail Durmuş | 8 |
| 1993–94 | Süper Lig | 9th | 30 | 9 | 8 | 13 | 26 | 39 | –13 | 35 | R6 | DNQ | Frank Pingel | 12 |
| 1994–95 | Süper Lig | 6th | 34 | 13 | 12 | 9 | 47 | 39 | +8 | 51 | QF | DNQ | Majid Musisi | 9 |
| 1995–96 | Süper Lig | 9th | 34 | 10 | 11 | 13 | 56 | 48 | +8 | 41 | R6 | QF | Majid Musisi | 15 |
| 1996–97 | Süper Lig | 5th | 34 | 17 | 8 | 9 | 55 | 37 | +18 | 59 | R6 | DNQ | Elvir Baljić | 21 |
| 1997–98 | Süper Lig | 8th | 34 | 12 | 9 | 13 | 46 | 50 | –4 | 45 | QF | DNQ | Elvir Baljić | 12 |
| 1998–99 | Süper Lig | 12th | 34 | 11 | 6 | 17 | 51 | 69 | –18 | 39 | R6 | DNQ | Murat Sözkesen | 11 |
| 1999–00 | Süper Lig | 10th | 34 | 12 | 6 | 16 | 51 | 63 | –12 | 42 | SF | DNQ | Okan Yılmaz | 13 |
| 2000–01 | Süper Lig | 14th | 34 | 11 | 7 | 16 | 55 | 60 | –5 | 40 | R4 | DNQ | Okan Yılmaz | 23 |
| 2001–02 | Süper Lig | 10th | 34 | 13 | 5 | 16 | 48 | 60 | –12 | 44 | R3 | DNQ | Okan Yılmaz | 13 |
| 2002–03 | Süper Lig | 15th | 34 | 9 | 9 | 16 | 42 | 62 | –20 | 36 | R2 | DNQ | Okan Yılmaz | 24 |
| 2003–04 | Süper Lig | 16th↓ | 34 | 10 | 10 | 14 | 40 | 40 | +0 | 40 | R3 | DNQ | Okan Yılmaz | 14 |
| 2004–05 | 1. Lig | 4th | 34 | 18 | 9 | 7 | 61 | 26 | +35 | 63 | R3 | DNQ | Okan Yılmaz | 25 |
| 2005–06 | 1. Lig | 1st↑ | 34 | 21 | 8 | 5 | 56 | 26 | +30 | 71 | GA | DNQ | Yunus Altun | 12 |
| 2006–07 | Süper Lig | 10th | 34 | 12 | 9 | 13 | 36 | 42 | –6 | 45 | QF | DNQ | Sinan Kaloğlu | 9 |
| 2007–08 | Süper Lig | 13th | 34 | 9 | 11 | 14 | 31 | 40 | –9 | 38 | GA | DNQ | Hervé Tum | 6 |
| 2008–09 | Süper Lig | 6th | 34 | 16 | 10 | 8 | 47 | 36 | +11 | 58 | QF | DNQ | Sercan Yıldırım | 11 |
| 2009–10 | Süper Lig | 1st | 34 | 23 | 6 | 5 | 65 | 26 | +39 | 75 | QF | DNQ | Ozan İpek | 8 |
| 2010–11 | Süper Lig | 3rd | 34 | 17 | 10 | 7 | 50 | 29 | +21 | 61 | GA | GS | Sercan Yıldırım | 7 |
| 2011–12 | Süper Lig | 8th | 40 | 17 | 10 | 13 | 52 | 41 | +11 | 49 | RU | PO | Pablo Batalla | 9 |
| 2012–13 | Süper Lig | 4th | 34 | 14 | 13 | 7 | 52 | 41 | +11 | 55 | GA | PO | Pablo Batalla | 15 |
| 2013–14 | Süper Lig | 8th | 34 | 12 | 10 | 12 | 40 | 46 | −6 | 46 | SF | 3QR | Fernandao | 10 |
| 2014–15 | Süper Lig | 6th | 34 | 16 | 9 | 9 | 69 | 44 | +25 | 57 | RU | 2QR | Fernandao | 26 |
| 2015–16 | Süper Lig | 11th | 34 | 13 | 5 | 16 | 47 | 55 | −8 | 44 | R16 | DNQ | Tomas Necid | 16 |
| 2016–17 | Süper Lig | 14th | 34 | 11 | 5 | 18 | 34 | 58 | −24 | 38 | GA | DNQ | Pablo Batalla | 9 |
| 2017–18 | Süper Lig | 13th | 34 | 11 | 6 | 17 | 43 | 48 | −5 | 39 | R16 | DNQ | Bogdan Stancu | 8 |
| 2018–19 | Süper Lig | 16th↓ | 34 | 7 | 16 | 11 | 28 | 37 | −9 | 37 | R4 | DNQ | Aytaç Kara | 6 |
| 2019–20 | 1. Lig | 6th | 36 | 17 | 9 | 10 | 50 | 45 | +5 | 56 | R5 | DNQ | Yevhen Seleznyov | 13 |
| 2020–21 | 1. Lig | 10th | 34 | 14 | 4 | 16 | 56 | 57 | −1 | 46 | R16 | DNQ | Batuhan Kör | 11 |
| 2021–22 | 1. Lig | 17th↓ | 36 | 12 | 8 | 16 | 43 | 53 | −10 | 44 | R5 | DNQ | Namiq Alasgarov | 6 |
| 2022–23 | 2. Lig | 14th | 36 | 12 | 10 | 14 | 51 | 57 | −6 | 46 | R2 | DNQ | Enver Cenk Şahin | 10 |
| 2023–24 | 2. Lig | 18th↓ | 36 | 6 | 8 | 22 | 28 | 64 | −36 | 23 | R2 | DNQ | Çağatay Yılmaz | 12 |
| 2024–25 | 3. Lig | 1st↑ | 28 | 21 | 7 | 2 | 64 | 17 | +47 | 70 | R4 | DNQ | Ahmet İlhan Özek | 10 |
| 2025–26 | 2. Lig | TBD | | | | | | | | | | | | |

=== League participation ===
- Süper Lig: 1967–2004, 2006–2019
- 1. Lig: 1963–1967, 2004–2006, 2019–2022
- 2. Lig: 2022–2024, 2025–
- 3. Lig: 2024–2025

== Bursaspor in Europe ==
Bursaspor has participated in several European competitions throughout its history, representing Turkish football on the continental stage. The club's first European appearance came in the 1974–75 European Cup Winners’ Cup, where they reached the quarter-finals, defeating Finn Harps and Dundee United before being eliminated by Dynamo Kyiv.

In the 1986–87 edition of the same tournament, Bursaspor returned to Europe but suffered a heavy aggregate defeat to eventual champions Ajax in the first round. Their best overall European performance came during the 1995 UEFA Intertoto Cup, where they finished first in Group 10, defeating clubs like Wimbledon, Charleroi, and Beitar Jerusalem. They advanced past OFI in the Round of 16 but were eliminated on away goals by Karlsruher SC in the quarter-finals.

Following their historic domestic title win in 2009–10, Bursaspor qualified directly for the 2010–11 UEFA Champions League group stage. Drawn into Group C with Manchester United, Valencia, and Rangers, they finished bottom of the group, securing only one point in six matches.

In the subsequent years, Bursaspor regularly competed in the UEFA Europa League qualifiers. They advanced to the play-off round in 2011–12, defeating Gomel but narrowly losing to Anderlecht. In 2012–13, they eliminated KuPS but fell to Twente. Their final European appearance came in the 2014–15 season, where they were eliminated by Chikhura Sachkhere of Georgia in the second qualifying round.

=== Summary ===
As of 24 July 2014

| Competition | Pld | W | D | L | GF | GA | GD |
|---|---|---|---|---|---|---|---|
| UEFA Champions League | 6 | 0 | 1 | 5 | 2 | 16 | −14 |
| UEFA Cup Winners' Cup | 8 | 2 | 2 | 4 | 5 | 12 | −7 |
| UEFA Europa League | 12 | 4 | 4 | 4 | 20 | 17 | +3 |
| UEFA Intertoto Cup | 6 | 4 | 2 | 0 | 14 | 5 | +9 |
| Total | 32 | 10 | 9 | 13 | 41 | 50 | –9 |

=== Results ===
| Season | Competition | Round | Opponent | Home | Away | Aggregate |
|---|---|---|---|---|---|---|
| 1974–75 | European Cup Winners' Cup | R1 | (Republic of Ireland) Finn Harps | 4–2 | 0–0 | 4–2 |
| 1974–75 | European Cup Winners' Cup | R2 | (Scotland) Dundee United | 1–0 | 0–0 | 1–0 |
| 1974–75 | European Cup Winners' Cup | QF | (Soviet Union) Dynamo Kiev | 0–1 | 0–2 | 0–3 |
| 1986–87 | European Cup Winners' Cup | R1 | (Netherlands) Ajax | 0–2 | 0–5 | 0–7 |
| 1995 | UEFA Intertoto Cup | Group 10 | (Slovakia) Košice | 1–1 | —N/a | 1st |
| 1995 | UEFA Intertoto Cup | Group 10 | (Belgium) Charleroi | —N/a | 2–0 | 1st |
| 1995 | UEFA Intertoto Cup | Group 10 | (England) Wimbledon | —N/a | 4–0 | 1st |
| 1995 | UEFA Intertoto Cup | Group 10 | (Israel) Beitar Jerusalem | 2–0 | —N/a | 1st |
| 1995 | UEFA Intertoto Cup | R16 | (Greece) OFI | 2–1 | —N/a | 2–1 |
| 1995 | UEFA Intertoto Cup | QF | (Germany) Karlsruher SC | 3–3 | —N/a | 3–3 (5–6 p) |
| 2010–11 | UEFA Champions League | Group C | (England) Manchester United | 0–3 | 0–1 | 4th |
| 2010–11 | UEFA Champions League | Group C | (Spain) Valencia | 0–4 | 1–6 | 4th |
| 2010–11 | UEFA Champions League | Group C | (Scotland) Rangers | 1–1 | 0–1 | 4th |
| 2011–12 | UEFA Europa League | 3QR | (Belarus) Gomel | 2–1 | 3–1 | 5–2 |
| 2011–12 | UEFA Europa League | PO | (Belgium) Anderlecht | 1–2 | 2–2 | 3–4 |
| 2012–13 | UEFA Europa League | 3QR | (Finland) KuPS | 6–0 | 0–1 | 6–1 |
| 2012–13 | UEFA Europa League | PO | (Netherlands) Twente | 3–1 | 1–4 | 4–5 |
| 2013–14 | UEFA Europa League | 3QR | (Serbia) Vojvodina | 0–3 | 2–2 | 2–5 |
| 2014–15 | UEFA Europa League | 2QR | (Georgia (country)) Chikhura Sachkhere | 0–0 | 0–0 | 0–0 (1–4 p) |

=== UEFA ranking history ===
As of 2019

| Season | Rank | Points | Ref. |
|---|---|---|---|
| 1975 | 144 ▲ | 1.166 | |
| 1976 | 146 ▼ | 1.166 | |
| 1977 | 150 ▼ | 1.166 | |
| 1978 | 154 ▼ | 1.166 | |
| 1979 | 149 ▲ | 1.166 | |
| 2011 | 135 ▲ | 12.010 | |
| 2012 | 124 ▲ | 13.310 | |
| 2013 | 120 ▲ | 14.900 | |
| 2014 | 122 ▼ | 15.840 | |
| 2015 | 119 ▲ | 16.020 | |
| 2016 | 152 ▼ | 11.420 | |
| 2017 | 151 ▲ | 10.840 | |
| 2018 | 154 ▼ | 7.160 | |
| 2019 | 159 ▼ | 6.920 | |

== Players ==
=== Current squad ===
As of 4 September 2026

Note: Flags indicate national team as defined under FIFA eligibility rules; some limited exceptions apply. Players may hold more than one non-FIFA nationality.

| No. | Pos. | Nation | Player |
|---|---|---|---|
| 1 | GK | TUR | Anıl Atağ |
| 4 | DF | TUR | Ertuğrul Ersoy |
| 5 | DF | TUR | Emirhan Başyiğit |
| 6 | MF | COL | Juergen Elitim |
| 7 | MF | TUR | Halil Akbunar |
| 8 | MF | TUR | Soner Aydoğdu |
| 9 | FW | TUR | Emir Kaan Gültekin |
| 10 | MF | BRA | Lincoln |
| 14 | FW | NGR | Kelechi Iheanacho |
| 18 | DF | TUR | Zeki Yavru |
| 20 | FW | TUR | Baran Başyiğit |
| 24 | DF | TUR | Alperen Babacan |
| 25 | GK | TUR | Efe Halaçlar |

| No. | Pos. | Nation | Player |
|---|---|---|---|
| 27 | DF | AZE | Toral Bayramov |
| 34 | MF | TUR | Eyüp Akcan |
| 39 | GK | TUR | Ahmet Kıvanç |
| 42 | MF | ENG | Lewis Baker |
| 52 | MF | TUR | Tayfun Aydoğan |
| 57 | DF | TUR | Batuhan Yayıkcı |
| 66 | DF | TUR | Hüseyin Maldar |
| 73 | FW | FRA | Amine Boutrah |
| 77 | DF | TUR | Rahmetullah Berişbek |
| 80 | FW | CRO | Ivan Šaranić |
| 93 | DF | TUR | Barış Gök |
| 98 | GK | TUR | Kerem Matışlı |

=== Out on loan ===
Note: Flags indicate national team as defined under FIFA eligibility rules; some limited exceptions apply. Players may hold more than one non-FIFA nationality.

| No. | Pos. | Nation | Player |
|---|---|---|---|
| — | DF | TUR | Emir Kayacık (at Kahramanmaraş İstiklalspor until 30 June 2027) |
| — | MF | TUR | Zeki Dursun (at Boluspor until 30 June 2027) |

| No. | Pos. | Nation | Player |
|---|---|---|---|
| — | FW | TUR | Ertuğrul Furat (at Muğlaspor until 30 June 2027) |
| — | FW | TUR | Salih Kavrazlı (at Sivasspor until 30 June 2027) |

== Honours ==
- Süper Lig
  - Winners (1): 2009–10
- 1. Lig
  - Winners (2): 1966–67, 2005–06
- 2. Lig
  - Winners (1): 2025–26
- 3. Lig
  - Winners (1): 2024–25
- Turkish Cup
  - Winners (1): 1985–86
  - Runners-up (5): 1970–71, 1973–74, 1991–92, 2011–12, 2014–15
- Turkish Super Cup
  - Runners-up (3): 1986, 2010, 2015
- Prime Minister's Cup:
  - Winners (2): 1971, 1992

== Club officials ==
=== Board members ===
| Position | Name |
|---|---|
| President | (Turkey) Enes Çelik |
| Vice President | (Turkey) Oğuzhan Kutlucan |
| Vice President | (Turkey) Mesut Günal |
| Secretary-General | (Turkey) Harun Yıldırım |
| Board Member | (Turkey) Faruk Bakgör |
| Board Member | (Turkey) Coşkun Yavuz |
| Board Member | (Turkey) Murat Hatipoğlu |
| Board Member | (Turkey) Coşkun Özgel |
| Board Member | (Turkey) Muhammet Danışman |
| Board Member | (Turkey) Embiya Topal |
| Substitute Member | (Turkey) Latif Albayrak |
| Substitute Member | (Turkey) Ali Ağır |
| Substitute Member | (Turkey) Fatih Pulat |
| Substitute Member | (Turkey) Erdinç Doğan |
| Substitute Member | (Turkey) Bilal Akmar |
| Executive Chairman | (Turkey) Abdullah Burkay |

=== Coaching staff ===
| Position | Name |
|---|---|
| Head Coach | (Turkey) Mustafa Er |
| Assistant Coach | (Turkey) Emrullah Akçal |
| Goalkeeping Coach | (Turkey) Ahmet Altın |
| Performance Coach | (Turkey) Ramazan Burak Öner |
| Performance Coach | (Turkey) Recep Berk Demir |
| Performance Coach | (Turkey) İbrahim Girak |
| Sporting Director | (Turkey) Recep Bülbül |
| Team Manager | (Turkey) Furkan Akın |
| Analysis Coach | (Turkey) Aytekin Sönmeyenmakas |
| Match Scout | (Turkey) Metin Aydemir |
| Media Officer | (Turkey) Fazıl Bartu Kösemsever |
| Physiotherapist | (Turkey) Furkan Akın |
| Masseur | (Turkey) Yusuf Bakan |
| Masseur | (Turkey) Aykan Kaya |
| Social Media | (Turkey) Emirhan Alan |
| Kit Manager | (Turkey) Gökhan Tokcan |
| Kit Manager | (Turkey) Hacı Kaya |

=== Notable coaches ===
The following coaches won at least one trophy when in charge of Bursaspor:

| Name | Period | Trophies |
|---|---|---|
| (Socialist Federal Republic of Yugoslavia) Tomislav Kaloperović | 1970–1973 | 1986 Turkish Cup, 1967 Prime Minister's Cup |
| (Turkey) Sabri Kiraz | 1966–1967 | 1966–67 TFF 1. Lig |
| (Turkey) Yılmaz Vural | 1991–1993 | 1992 Prime Minister's Cup |
| (Turkey) Raşit Çetiner | 2005–2006 | 2005–06 TFF 1. Lig |
| (Turkey) Ertuğrul Sağlam | 2009–2013 | 2009–10 Süper Lig |
| (Turkey) Adem Çağlayan | 2025–present | 2024–25 TFF 3. Lig |
