= 2017–18 Fenerbahçe S.K. season =

Fenerbahçe
2017–18 season
- President: Aziz Yıldırım
- Head coach: Aykut Kocaman
- Stadium: Şükrü Saracoğlu Stadium
- Süper Lig: 2nd
- Turkish Cup: Runners-up
- UEFA Europa League: Play-off round
- Top goalscorer: League: Giuliano (14 goals); All: Giuliano (15 goals)
- Highest home attendance: 44,490 vs. Beşiktaş (20 September 2016, Süper Lig)
- Lowest home attendance: 19,780 vs. Sivasspor (19 November 2017, Süper Lig)
- Average home league attendance: 29,035
Home colours	Away colours	Third colours

The 2017–18 season is Fenerbahçe's 60th consecutive season in the Süper Lig and their 111th year in existence.

== Transfers ==
=== In ===
No.	Pos.	Nat.	Name	Age	Moving from	Type	Transfer window	Ends	Transfer fee	Source
54	GK	(Turkey)	Erten Ersu	23	Gaziantepspor	End of loan	Summer	2019		
	MF	(Turkey)	Ramazan Civelek	21	Gazişehir Gaziantep	End of loan	Summer	2019		
11	MF	(Turkey)	Mehmet Ekici	27	Trabzonspor	Transfer	Summer	2020	Free	Fenerbahce.org
28	MF	(France)	Mathieu Valbuena	32	(France) Lyon	Transfer	Summer	2019	€1.50M	Fenerbahce.org
17	MF	(Morocco)	Nabil Dirar	31	(France) Monaco	Transfer	Summer	2020	€4.50M	Fenerbahce.org
18	GK	(Cameroon)	Carlos Kameni	33	(Spain) Málaga	Transfer	Summer	2020	Free	Fenerbahce.org
21	MF	(North Macedonia)	Eljif Elmas	17	(North Macedonia) Rabotnički	Transfer	Summer	2022		
99	FW	(Spain)	Roberto Soldado	32	(Spain) Villarreal	Transfer	Summer	2019		
20	MF	(Brazil)	Giuliano	27	(Russia) Zenit Saint Petersburg	Transfer	Summer	2019	€7.00M	Fenerbahce.org
14	MF	(Portugal)	Luís Neto	29	(Russia) Zenit Saint Petersburg	Loan	Summer	2018	Free	Fenerbahce.org
23	FW	(Netherlands)	Vincent Janssen	23	(England) Tottenham Hotspur	Loan	Summer	2018	Free	Fenerbahce.org

=== Out ===
No.	Pos.	Nat.	Name	Age	Moving to	Type	Transfer window	Transfer fee	Source
40	GK	(Brazil)	Fabiano	29	(Portugal) Porto	End of loan	Summer		
11	MF	(Ukraine)	Oleksandr Karavayev	25	(Ukraine) Shakhtar Donetsk	End of loan	Summer		
77	MF	(Netherlands)	Jeremain Lens	29	(England) Sunderland	End of loan	Summer		
17	MF	(Senegal)	Moussa Sow	31	(United Arab Emirates) Al-Ahli Dubai	End of loan	Summer		
4	DF	(Denmark)	Simon Kjær	28	(Spain) Sevilla	Transfer	Summer	€12.75M	Fenerbahce.org
29	FW	(Nigeria)	Emmanuel Emenike	30	(Greece) Olympiacos	Transfer	Summer	€2.50M	Fenerbahce.org
13	GK	(Turkey)	Ertuğrul Taşkıran	27	Boluspor	Transfer	Summer		
	DF	(Turkey)	Melih Okutan	20	Boluspor	Transfer	Summer		
	DF	(Turkey)	Hakan Çinemre	23	Göztepe	Transfer	Summer		
20	MF	(Turkey)	Volkan Şen	30	Trabzonspor	Transfer	Summer		
99	MF	(Slovakia)	Miroslav Stoch	27	(Czech Republic) Slavia Prague	Transfer	Summer	€1.00M	Fenerbahce.org
23	DF	(Netherlands)	Gregory van der Wiel	29	(Italy) Cagliari	Transfer	Summer	€1.00M	cagliaricalcio.com
48	MF	(Turkey)	Salih Uçan	23	(Switzerland) Sion	Loan	Summer		
	FW	(Turkey)	Beykan Şimşek	22	Sakaryaspor	Loan	Summer		
	MF	(Turkey)	Erdi Şehit	23	Gençlerbirliği	Loan	Summer		
	FW	(Turkey)	Ramazan Civelek	21	Sakaryaspor	Loan	Summer		
39	FW	(Turkey)	Ahmethan Köse	20	Boluspor	Loan	Winter		
10	FW	(Netherlands)	Robin van Persie	34	(Netherlands) Feyenoord	Transfer	Winter	Free	feyenoord.nl

Total spending: ▼€17,680,000
Total income: ▲€18,750,000
Expenditure: ▲€1,070,000

== Players ==
=== First team squad ===
N	Pos.	Nat.	Name	Age	EU	Since	App	Goals	Ends	Transfer fee	Notes
1	GK	(Turkey)	Volkan Demirel (Captain)	36	Non-EU	2002	490	0	2018	Free	
3	DF	(Turkey)	Hasan Ali Kaldırım	28	EU	2012	185	5	2020	€3.75M	Second nationality: German
4	DF	(Chile)	Mauricio Isla	29	Non-EU	2017	29	0	2020	Free	
5	MF	(Turkey)	Mehmet Topal (Vice-Captain)	32	Non-EU	2012	262	21	2020	€4.50M	
6	DF	(Turkey)	İsmail Köybaşı	28	Non-EU	2017	43	2	2019	Free	
7	MF	(Turkey)	Alper Potuk	27	Non-EU	2013	192	16	2022	€7.50M	
8	MF	(Turkey)	Ozan Tufan	22	Non-EU	2015	98	9	2020	€7.00M	
9	FW	(Brazil)	Fernandão	31	Non-EU	2015	104	50	2019	€3.40M	
11	MF	(Turkey)	Mehmet Ekici	28	EU	2017	11	0	2020	Free	Second nationality: German
14	DF	(Portugal)	Luís Neto	29	EU	2017	16	0	2018	Free	On loan from Zenit
17	MF	(Morocco)	Nabil Dirar	32	EU	2017	37	5	2020	€2.00M	Second nationality: Belgian
18	GK	(Cameroon)	Carlos Kameni	34	EU	2017	16	0	2020	Free	Second nationality: French
19	DF	(Turkey)	Şener Özbayraklı	28	Non-EU	2015	93	5	2019	€1.63M	
20	MF	(Brazil)	Giuliano	27	Non-EU	2017	15	6	2021	€7.00M	
21	MF	(North Macedonia)	Eljif Elmas	18	EU	2017	7	0	2022	€0.18M	
23	FW	(Netherlands)	Vincent Janssen	23	EU	2017	18	5	2018	Free	On loan from Tottenham Hotspur
28	MF	(France)	Mathieu Valbuena	33	EU	2017	40	8	2019	€1.50M	
33	DF	(Russia)	Roman Neustädter	30	EU	2016	77	5	2019	Free	Second nationality: German
37	DF	(Slovakia)	Martin Škrtel	33	EU	2016	79	6	2019	€6.00M	
53	DF	(Turkey)	Yiğithan Güveli	20	Non-EU	2016	9	1	2019	Youth system	
54	GK	(Turkey)	Erten Ersu	24	Non-EU	2013	4	0	2019	Youth system	
60	MF	(Turkey)	Yiğithan Güveli	20	Non-EU	2017	11	2	2020	Youth system	
66	DF	(Turkey)	Oğuz Kağan Güçtekin	19	Non-EU	2017	13	0	2020	Youth system	
89	MF	(Brazil)	Souza	29	Non-EU	2015	134	15	2019	€8.00M	
92	MF	(Morocco)	Aatif Chahechouhe	31	EU	2016	66	14	2019	Free	Second nationality: French
99	FW	(Spain)	Roberto Soldado	32	EU	2017	34	12	2019	€5.00M	

- Last updated: 20 June 2018
- Source: Fenerbahce.org
- Ordered by squad number.

== Statistics ==
As of 21 May 2018

No.	PMF.	Nat.	Player	Süper Lig						Turkish Cup						Europa League						Total						Friendly					
No.	PMF.	Nat.	Player	Ap	G	A	Yellow card	(yellow card) (red card)	Red card	Ap	G	A	Yellow card	(yellow card) (red card)	Red card	Ap	G	A	Yellow card	(yellow card) (red card)	Red card	Ap	G	A	Yellow card	(yellow card) (red card)	Red card	Ap	G	A	Yellow card	(yellow card) (red card)	Red card
1	GK	(Turkey)	Volkan Demirel (captain)	25	-	-	2	-	-	3	-	-	-	1	-	2	-	-	-	-	-	30	-	-	2	1	-	3	-	-	-	-	-
3	DF	(Turkey)	Hasan Ali Kaldırım	24	1	5	5	-	-	9	1	2	-	-	-	3	-	-	-	-	-	36	2	7	5	-	-	5	-	-	-	-	-
4	DF	(Chile)	Mauricio Isla	21	-	3	2	-	-	4	-	-	-	-	-	4	-	-	-	-	-	29	-	3	2	-	-	2	-	-	-	-	-
5	MF	(Turkey)	Mehmet Topal	29	2	3	3	-	-	8	1	1	1	-	-	4	-	-	-	-	-	41	3	4	4	-	-	5	-	-	-	-	-
6	DF	(Turkey)	İsmail Köybaşı	14	-	3	3	-	1	1	-	-	1	-	-	1	-	-	-	-	-	16	-	3	4	-	1	7	-	-	-	-	-
7	MF	(Turkey)	Alper Potuk	25	3	2	5	-	1	5	3	-	-	1	-	4	-	-	1	-	-	34	6	2	6	1	1	7	-	-	-	-	-
8	MF	(Turkey)	Ozan Tufan	9	3	1	-	-	-	1	-	-	-	-	-	4	-	-	2	-	-	14	3	1	2	-	-	6	-	-	-	-	-
9	FW	(Brazil)	Fernandão	18	9	1	1	-	-	6	4	-	-	-	-	-	-	-	-	-	-	24	13	-	1	-	-	1	1	-	-	-	-
11	MF	(Turkey)	Mehmet Ekici	9	-	1	3	-	-	2	-	1	1	-	-	-	-	-	-	-	-	11	-	2	4	-	-	2	2	-	-	-	-
14	DF	(Portugal)	Luís Neto	13	-	-	4	-	1	3	-	-	1	-	-	-	-	-	-	-	-	16	-	-	5	-	1	-	-	-	-	-	-
15	MF	(Turkey)	Uygar Mert Zeybek	1	-	-	-	-	-	7	1	-	1	-	-	1	-	-	-	-	-	9	1	-	1	-	-	-	-	-	-	-	-
17	MF	(Morocco)	Nabil Dirar	29	4	8	4	-	-	4	1	-	-	-	-	4	1	-	-	-	-	37	6	8	4	-	-	5	1	-	-	-	-
18	GK	(Cameroon)	Carlos Kameni	9	-	-	1	-	-	5	-	-	-	-	-	2	-	-	-	-	-	16	-	-	1	-	-	3	-	-	-	-	-
19	DF	(Turkey)	Şener Özbayraklı	19	5	1	5	-	-	6	1	2	-	-	-	3	-	-	-	-	-	28	6	3	5	-	-	6	-	-	1	-	-
20	MF	(Brazil)	Giuliano	30	14	5	-	-	-	4	1	1	-	-	-	-	-	-	-	-	-	34	15	5	-	-	-	1	1	-	-	-	-
21	MF	(North Macedonia)	Eljif Elmas	5	-	-	-	-	-	2	-	1	-	-	-	-	-	-	-	-	-	7	-	1	-	-	-	2	-	-	-	-	-
23	FW	(Netherlands)	Vincent Janssen	16	4	2	4	-	-	2	1	-	1	-	-	-	-	-	-	-	-	18	5	2	5	-	-	-	-	-	-	-	-
28	MF	(France)	Mathieu Valbuena	29	7	9	2	-	-	7	1	5	-	-	-	4	-	2	-	-	-	40	8	16	2	-	-	7	1	-	-	-	-
33	DF	(Russia)	Roman Neustädter	32	3	-	5	-	-	9	-	-	-	-	-	3	2	-	2	-	-	44	5	-	7	-	-	6	-	-	-	-	-
37	DF	(Slovakia)	Martin Škrtel	21	3	-	8	1	-	5	-	-	1	-	-	4	-	1	-	-	-	30	3	1	19	1	-	3	-	-	1	-	-
53	DF	(Turkey)	Yiğithan Güveli	-	-	-	-	-	-	2	-	-	-	-	-	-	-	-	-	-	-	2	-	-	-	-	-	1	-	-	-	-	-
54	GK	(Turkey)	Erten Ersu	-	-	-	-	-	-	2	-	-	-	-	-	-	-	-	-	-	-	2	-	-	-	-	-	1	-	-	-	-	-
60	MF	(Turkey)	Samed Karakoç	1	-	-	1	-	-	5	1	-	-	-	-	-	-	-	-	-	-	6	1	-	1	-	-	1	-	-	-	-	-
66	MF	(Turkey)	Oğuz Kağan Güçtekin	8	-	-	1	-	-	5	-	-	1	-	-	-	-	-	-	-	-	13	-	-	2	-	-	1	-	-	-	-	-
89	MF	(Brazil)	Souza	33	3	1	6	-	-	5	1	-	-	-	-	3	-	-	-	-	1	41	4	1	6	-	1	6	-	-	1	-	-
92	MF	(Morocco)	Aatif Chahechouhe	26	5	2	4	-	-	8	2	-	1	-	-	3	-	-	-	-	-	37	7	2	5	-	-	6	-	-	-	-	-
99	FW	(Spain)	Roberto Soldado	26	9	4	3	-	-	6	3	-	-	-	-	2	-	-	1	-	-	34	12	4	4	-	-	1	-	-	-	-	-
10	FW	(Netherlands)	Robin van Persie	2	-	-	-	-	-	-	-	-	-	-	-	2	-	-	-	-	-	4	-	-	-	-	-	5	-	-	-	-	-
39	MF	(Turkey)	Ahmethan Köse	1	-	-	-	-	-	2	1	-	-	-	-	4	-	-	-	-	-	7	1	-	-	-	-	5	-	-	-	-	-

== Pre-season and friendlies ==
Win Draw Loss Postponed

=== Pre-season ===
8 July 2017 Friendly	Fenerbahçe (Turkey)	2–3	(Romania) Juventus București	Düzce
18:00	Ekici 56', 67'	Report	Muscă 5'; Băjenaru 17'; Petre 43'	Stadium: Düzce Stadı; Referee: Suat Arslanboğa

12 July 2017 Friendly	Fenerbahçe (Turkey)	1–2	(Portugal) Sporting CP	Lausanne, Switzerland
20:00 CEST	Dirar 40'	Report	Dost 32'; Doumbia 17'	Stadium: Stade du Censuy

15 July 2017 Friendly	Fenerbahçe (Turkey)	0–1	(France) Olympique de Marseille	Lausanne, Switzerland
21:00 CEST	Škrtel (yellow card) 10'	Report	Sarr (yellow card) 27'; Sanson (yellow card) 40'; Lopez (yellow card) 42'; Germain 77'	Stadium: Stade de la Pontaise; Referee: Fedayi San (Switzerland)

17 July 2017 Friendly	Fenerbahçe (Turkey)	0–0	(Spain) Athletic Bilbao	Lausanne, Switzerland
20:00 CEST	Souza (yellow card) 26'	Report	Aduriz (yellow card) 36'	Stadium: Municipal; Referee: Adrien Jaccottet (Switzerland); Assistant referees: Jan Kobeli, Stephane Almeida

19 July 2017 Friendly	Fenerbahçe (Turkey)	1–1	(France) Monaco	Montreux, Switzerland
19:07 CEST	Özbayraklı (yellow card) 36'; Stoch 78'	Report	Lemar 53'; Glik (yellow card) 77'	Stadium: Stade de Chailly; Referee: Alain Bieri; Assistant referees: Alain Heiniger, Sladan Josipovic; Fourth official: Yves Degallier

7 August 2017 Friendly	Fenerbahçe (Turkey)	1–0	(Italy) Cagliari	Istanbul
20:30	Valbuena 61'	Report		Stadium: Şükrü Saracoğlu Stadium; Referee: Arda Kardeşler; Assistant referees: Mehmet Cem Hanoğlu, Osman Gökhan Bilir

=== Mid-season ===
13 January 2018 Friendly	Fenerbahçe (Turkey)	2–2	(Albania) FK Kukësi	Antalya
20:00	Giuliano 48' (pen.); Fernandão 90+1' (pen.)	Report	Elis 28'; Bujar 28'	Stadium: Gloria Sports Arena

== Competitions ==
=== Overview ===
Competition	First match	Last match	Starting round	Final position	Record							
Competition	First match	Last match	Starting round	Final position	Pld	W	D	L	GF	GA	GD	Win %
Süper Lig	12 August 2017	19 May 2018	Matchday 1	2nd	34	21	9	4	78	36	+42	61.76
Turkish Cup	29 November 2017	10 May 2018	Fifth round	Runners–up	9	7	1	1	24	8	+16	77.78
UEFA Europa League	27 July 2017	24 August 2017	Third qualifying round	Play-off round	8	3	2	3	4	6	−2	37.50
Total					51	31	12	8	106	50	+56	60.78

Last updated: 19 May 2018.
Source: Competitions

=== Süper Lig ===
==== League table ====
Pos	Team	Pld	W	D	L	GF	GA	GD	Pts	Qualification or relegation
1	Galatasaray (C)	34	24	3	7	75	33	+42	75	Qualification for the Champions League group stage
2	Fenerbahçe	34	21	9	4	78	36	+42	72 (Note: Fenerbahçe ahead of Başakşehir on head-to-head goal difference: Fenerbahçe 2–3 Başakşehir, Başakşehir 0–2 Fenerbahçe.)	Qualification for the Champions League third qualifying round
3	Başakşehir	34	22	6	6	62	34	+28	72	Qualification for the Europa League third qualifying round
4	Beşiktaş	34	21	8	5	69	30	+39	71	Qualification for the Europa League second qualifying round
5	Trabzonspor	34	15	10	9	63	51	+12	55	

Source: Süper Lig, Soccerway
Rules for classification: 1) Points; 2) Head-to-head points; 3) Head-to-head goal difference; 4) Head-to-head goals scored; 5) Goal difference; 6) Goals scored; 7) Play-off.
(C) Champions

==== Results summary ====
Overall								Home						Away					
Pld	W	D	L	GF	GA	GD	Pts	W	D	L	GF	GA	GD	W	D	L	GF	GA	GD
34	21	9	4	78	36	+42	72	11	4	2	42	23	+19	10	5	2	36	13	+23

Last updated: 21 May 2018.
Source: TFF.org

Pld = Matches played; W = Matches won; D = Matches drawn; L = Matches lost; GF = Goals for; GA = Goals against; GD = Goal difference; Pts = Points

==== Results by round ====
Round	1	2	3	4	5	6	7	8	9	10	11	12	13	14	15	16	17	18	19	20	21	22	23	24	25	26	27	28	29	30	31	32	33	34
Ground	A	H	A	H	A	H	A	H	A	H	A	H	A	H	A	H	A	H	A	H	A	H	A	H	A	H	A	H	A	H	A	H	A	H
Result	D	D	W	L	W	W	L	W	D	D	D	W	W	W	W	W	D	W	D	D	W	W	L	L	W	D	W	W	W	W	W	W	W	W
Position	8	13	6	11	8	4	7	5	6	8	7	5	3	3	3	2	3	3	3	3	3	3	4	4	4	4	4	4	4	4	3	2	2	2

Updated to match(es) played on 21 May 2018. Source: TFF.org
A = Away; H = Home; W = Win; D = Draw; L = Loss

==== Matches ====
Win Draw Loss Postponed

12 August 2017 1	Göztepe	2–2	Fenerbahçe	İzmir
21:45 TRT (UTC+3)	Castro 8', (yellow card) 90'; Beto (yellow card) 23'; Rotman (yellow card) 23'; Scarione 57'; Sabrıoğlu (yellow card) 89'	Report	Potuk 5'; Škrtel 64'; Karakoç (yellow card) 90'	Stadium: Bornova Stadium; Attendance: 266; Referee: Yaşar Kemal Uğurlu; Assistant referees: Kemal Yılmaz, Serkan Çimen; Fourth official: Serkan Tokat

20 August 2017 2	Fenerbahçe	2–2	Trabzonspor	Istanbul
21:45 TRT (UTC+3)	Potuk 45', (yellow card) 50'; Souza (yellow card) 62'; Valbuena 84' (pen.)	Report	Yılmaz 5'; Şahan (yellow card) 11', (goal) 56'; Yazıcı (yellow card) 52'; Bero (yellow card) 85'; N'Doye (yellow card) 86'	Stadium: Şükrü Saracoğlu Stadium; Attendance: 39,539; Referee: Ali Palabıyık; Assistant referees: Ceyhun Sesigüzel, Serkan Olguncan; Fourth official: Suat Arslanboğa

27 August 2017 3	Gençlerbirliği	1–2	Fenerbahçe	Ankara
21:45 TRT (UTC+3)	Oğuz (yellow card) 32', (goal) 37' (pen.); Rantie (red card) 42'; Duruer (yellow card) 63' (yellow-red card) 85'	Report	Pehlivan 20' (o.g.); Škrtel (yellow card) 24'; Kaldırım (yellow card) 42'; Valbuena (yellow card) 53'; Neustädter (yellow card) 58'; Tufan 67'	Stadium: 19 Mayıs Stadium; Attendance: 4,267; Referee: Ümit Öztürk; Assistant referees: Ekrem Kan, Kerem Ersoy; Fourth official: Ali Şansalan

9 September 2017 4	Fenerbahçe	2–3	İstanbul Başakşehir	Istanbul
20:00 TRT (UTC+3)	Souza (yellow card) 32'; Dirar 43'; Škrtel 78'; Köybaşı (yellow card) 82'	Report	Attamah 2'; Epureanu (yellow card) 23'; Adebayor 33'; Belözoğlu (yellow card) 34'; Clichy (yellow card) 36'; Babacan (yellow card) 42'; Frei 90+2'	Stadium: Şükrü Saracoğlu Stadium; Attendance: 24,365; Referee: Fırat Aydınus; Assistant referees: Serkan Ok, Süleyman Özay; Fourth official: Mustafa Öğretmenoğlu

17 September 2017 5	Alanyaspor	1–4	Fenerbahçe	Alanya, Antalya
20:00 TRT (UTC+3)	Akbaba 42'	Report	Janssen 16'; Neto (yellow card) 27'; Souza (yellow card) 45'; Valbuena 45+3', 90+5'; Giuliano 60' (pen.); Kameni (yellow card) 79'	Stadium: Bahçeşehir Okulları Stadium; Referee: Mete Kalkavan; Assistant referees: Ceyhun Sesigüzel, Esat Sancaktar; Fourth official: Suat Arslanboğa

23 September 2017 6	Fenerbahçe	2–1	Beşiktaş	Istanbul
19:30 TRT (UTC+3)	Giuliano 20' (pen.); Janssen 86' (pen.), (yellow card) 22'; Ekici (yellow card) 30'; Neto (red card) 45'; Potuk (yellow card) 77'; Köybaşı (red card) 88'	Report	Özyakup (yellow card) 22' (yellow-red card) AG'; Hutchinson (yellow card) 36' (yellow-red card) 85'; Quaresma (yellow card) 41' (yellow-red card) 43'; Tošić (yellow card) 78'; Ryan Babel 87'; Babel (yellow card) 90'; Negredo (yellow card) 90'	Stadium: Şükrü Saracoğlu Stadium; Attendance: 44,690; Referee: Ali Palabıyık; Assistant referees: Mehmet Cem Satman, Serkan Olgun; Fourth official: Yaşar Kemal Uğurlu

29 September 2017 7	Akhisarspor	1–0	Fenerbahçe	Manisa
20:00 TRT (UTC+3)	Osmanpaşa (yellow card) 21'; Sissoko (yellow card) 53'; Ayık 60'; Yumlu (yellow card) 88'	Report	Janssen (yellow card) 11'; Škrtel (yellow card) 55' (yellow-red card) 86'; Tufan (yellow card) 58'; Souza (red card) 82'; Soldado (yellow card) 89'	Stadium: 19 Mayıs Stadium; Referee: Bülent Yıldırım; Assistant referees: Kemal Yılmaz, Asım Yusuf Öz; Fourth official: Serkan Çınar

15 October 2017 8	Fenerbahçe	3–1	Yeni Malatyaspor	Istanbul
19:30 TRT (UTC+3)	Tufan 4'; Giuliano 6'; Kaldırım 27', (yellow card) 29'	Report	Yıldırım (yellow card) 58'; Altıntaş 68'	Stadium: Şükrü Saracoğlu Stadium; Attendance: 21,514; Referee: Alper Ulusoy; Assistant referees: Mustafa Emre Eyisoy, Volkan Ahmet Narinç; Fourth official: Bahattin Şimşek

22 October 2017 9	Galatasaray	0–0	Fenerbahçe	Istanbul
19:30 TRT (UTC+3)	Mariano (yellow card) 10'; Denayer (yellow card) 24'; Belhanda (yellow card) 34' (yellow-red card) 73'; Fernandão (yellow card) 53'	Report	Neto (yellow card) 44'; Potuk (yellow card) 77'	Stadium: Türk Telekom Stadium; Attendance: 50.023; Referee: Cüneyt Çakır; Assistant referees: Bahattin Duran, Tarık Ongun; Fourth official: Hüseyin Göçek

30 October 2017 10	Fenerbahçe	3–3	Kayserispor	Istanbul
20:00 TRT (UTC+3)	Tufan 44'; Neustädter 50', (yellow card) 90+1'; Souza 62'; Neto (yellow card) 67'; Janssen (yellow card) 87'	Report	Bulut 40'; Kucher (yellow card) 61'; Neto 68' (o.g.); Gyan 90+5'	Stadium: Şükrü Saracoğlu Stadium; Attendance: 22,108; Referee: Halil Umut Meler; Assistant referees: Ekrem Kan, Kerem Ersoy; Fourth official: Suat Arslanboğa

4 November 2017 11	Osmanlıspor	1–1	Fenerbahçe	Ankara
19:30 TRT (UTC+3)	Umar 89'; Josué (yellow card) 23'; Vršajević (yellow card) 21'	Report	Giuliano 7'; Potuk (yellow card) 50'; Neto (yellow card) 56'; Özbayraklı (yellow card) 68'; Neustädter (yellow card) 79'; Demirel (yellow card) 88'	Stadium: Osmanlı Stadium; Attendance: 3,252; Referee: Fırat Aydınus; Assistant referees: Serkan Ok, Aleks Taşçıoğlu; Fourth official: Ali Şansalan

19 November 2017 12	Fenerbahçe	4–1	Sivasspor	Istanbul
19:30 TRT (UTC+3)	Dirar 31'; Özbayraklı (yellow card) 54'; Topal (yellow card) 57'; Soldado 61', 77', 81'; Köybaşı (yellow card) 89'	Report	Bifouma 47', (red card) 64'; Auremir (yellow card) 55'; Erdal (yellow card) 63'; N'Dinga (yellow card) 63'; Arslan (yellow card) 71'	Stadium: Şükrü Saracoğlu Stadium; Attendance: 19,780; Referee: Yaşar Kemal Uğurlu; Assistant referees: Kemal Yılmaz, Samet Çiçek; Fourth official: Arda Kardeşler

26 November 2017 13	Antalyaspor	0–1	Fenerbahçe	Antalya
19:30 TRT (UTC+3)	Charles (yellow card) 15'	Report	Giuliano 45'; Souza (yellow card) 89'; Janssen (yellow card) 90'	Stadium: New Antalya Stadium; Attendance: 23,763; Referee: Mete Kalkavan; Assistant referees: Ceyhun Sesigüzel, Erdem Bayık; Fourth official: Serkan Tokat

3 December 2017 14	Fenerbahçe	4–2	Kasımpaşa	Istanbul
19:30 TRT (UTC+3)	Neustädter 26'; Özbayraklı (yellow card) 45'; Demirel (yellow card) 45'; Giuliano 49', 62'; Škrtel (yellow card) 54'; Valbuena (yellow card) 81'	Report	Mensah 45', (yellow card) 55'; Murillo 82'	Stadium: Şükrü Saracoğlu Stadium; Attendance: 33,091; Referee: Ümit Öztürk; Assistant referees: Kemal Yılmaz, Asım Yusuf Öz; Fourth official: Volkan Bayarslan

8 December 2017 15	Bursaspor	0–1	Fenerbahçe	Bursa
20:00 TRT (UTC+3)	Ersoy (yellow card) 17'; Behich (yellow card) 77'	Report	Škrtel (yellow card) 24'; Chahechouhe (yellow card) 25'; Giuliano 65' (pen.); Soldado (yellow card) 86'	Stadium: Timsah Arena; Attendance: 33,108; Referee: Ali Palabıyık; Assistant referees: Serkan Olguncan, Kerem Ersoy; Fourth official: Serkan Tokat

18 December 2017 16	Fenerbahçe	2–0	Karabükspor	Istanbul
20:00 TRT (UTC+3)	Özbayraklı (yellow card) 38'; Škrtel (yellow card) 39'; Topal 56'; Valbuena 76'; Köybaşı (yellow card) 82'; Neustädter (yellow card) 90+3'	Report	Gülselam (yellow card) 22'; Ibáñez (yellow card) 34'; Başdaş (yellow card) 35'; Çelik (yellow card) 51'; Gaman (yellow card) 52'; Poko (yellow card) 80'	Stadium: Şükrü Saracoğlu Stadium; Attendance: 33,018; Referee: Alper Ulusoy; Assistant referees: Mustafa Emre Eyisoy, Hakan Yemişken; Fourth official: Arda Kardeşler

23 December 2017 17	Konyaspor	1–1	Fenerbahçe	Konya
19:30 TRT (UTC+3)	Bourabia (yellow card) 36'; Öztorun (yellow card) 54'; Şahiner 58'; Bora (yellow card) 75'; Manyama (yellow card) 82'	Report	Topal 69'	Stadium: Konya Büyükşehir Stadium; Attendance: 21,056; Referee: Fırat Aydınus; Assistant referees: Serkan Ok, Aleks Taşçıoğlu; Fourth official: Koray Gençerler

20 January 2018 18	Fenerbahçe	2–1	Göztepe	Istanbul
19:00 TRT (UTC+3)	Chahechouhe (yellow card) 11'; Fernandão 14'; Kosanović 90+2' (o.g.); Potuk (yellow card) 90+3'; Škrtel (yellow card) AG'	Report	Kadu (yellow card) 44'; Poko 59'; Castro (yellow card) 90+3'; Kayhan (yellow card) 90+4'; Şahin (yellow card) AG'	Stadium: Şükrü Saracoğlu Stadium; Attendance: 34,633; Referee: Ümit Öztürk; Assistant referees: Kerem Ersoy, İsmail Şencan; Fourth official: Mustafa Öğretmenoğlu

28 January 2018 19	Trabzonspor	1–1	Fenerbahçe	Trabzon
19:30 TRT (UTC+3)	Yılmaz 58'; Çörekçi (yellow card) 83'; Pereira (yellow card) 90+1'	Report	Fernandão (yellow card) 54'; Isla (yellow card) 63'; Souza 84', (yellow card) 84'	Stadium: Şenol Güneş Stadium; Attendance: 41,461; Referee: Ali Palabıyık; Assistant referees: Kemal Yılmaz, Serkan Olguncan; Fourth official: Koray Gençerler

3 February 2018 20	Fenerbahçe	2–2	Gençlerbirliği	Istanbul
19:00 TRT (UTC+3)	Potuk 46'; Soldado (yellow card) 50'; Dirar 61', (yellow card) 76'; Güçtekin (yellow card) 67'	Report	Issah (yellow card) 17'; Palitsevich (yellow card) 44'; Dirar 45' (o.g.); Jaílton Paraíba (yellow card) 45+1'; Milinković 70'; Luccas Claro (yellow card) 89'; Yılmaz (yellow card) 90+4'	Stadium: Şükrü Saracoğlu Stadium; Referee: Mete Kalkavan; Assistant referees: Ceyhun Sesigüzel, Erdem Bayık; Fourth official: Mustafa Öğretmenoğlu

11 February 2018 21	İstanbul Başakşehir	0–2	Fenerbahçe	Istanbul
19:00 TRT (UTC+3)	Tekdemir (yellow card) 74'; Adebayor (yellow card) 90'	Report	Fernandão 32', 56'	Stadium: Başakşehir Fatih Terim Stadium; Referee: Halil Umut Meler; Assistant referees: Mustafa Emre Eyisoy, Cevdet Kömürcüoğlu; Fourth official: Suat Arslanboğa

17 February 2018 22	Fenerbahçe	3–0	Alanyaspor	Istanbul
19:00 TRT (UTC+3)	Giuliano 20', 60' (pen.); Fernandão 27'; Kaldırım (yellow card) 82'	Report		Stadium: Şükrü Saracoğlu Stadium; Referee: Ümit Öztürk; Assistant referees: Ali Saygın Ögel, Osman Gökhan Bilir; Fourth official: Bahattin Şimşek

25 February 2018 23	Beşiktaş	3–1	Fenerbahçe	Istanbul
19:00 TRT (UTC+3)	Vida (yellow card) 39', (goal) 49'; Arslan (yellow card) 50'; Quaresma 77', 90', (yellow card) 90'	Report	Fernandão 8'; Isla (yellow card) 33'; Özbayraklı (yellow card) 38'	Stadium: Vodafone Park; Referee: Cüneyt Çakır; Assistant referees: Bahattin Duran, Tarık Ongun; Fourth official: Barış Şimşek

4 March 2018 24	Fenerbahçe	2–3	Akhisarspor	Istanbul
19:00 TRT (UTC+3)	Giuliano 57'; Chahechouhe 67'	Report	Sissoko (yellow card) 5'; Serginho 14'; Lopes (yellow card) 26'; Seleznyov 35'; Yumlu (yellow card) 57'; Larsson 59', (yellow card) 62'; Lukač (yellow card) 71'	Stadium: Şükrü Saracoğlu Stadium; Referee: Arda Kardeşler; Assistant referees: Kerem Ersoy, Hakan Yemişken; Fourth official: Bahattin Şimşek

11 March 2018 25	Yeni Malatyaspor	0–2	Fenerbahçe	Malatya
16:00 TRT (UTC+3)		Report	Neustädter 34', (yellow card) 45'; Chahechouhe (yellow card) 90'; Giuliano 90+2'	Stadium: Malatya Arena; Referee: Mete Kalkavan; Assistant referees: Ceyhun Sesigüzel, Erdem Bayık; Fourth official: Serkan Çınar

17 March 2018 26	Fenerbahçe	0–0	Galatasaray	Istanbul
19:00 TRT (UTC+3)	Dirar (yellow card) 68'; Škrtel (yellow card) 88'	Report	Fernando (yellow card) 46'; Maicon (yellow card) 90'; Aziz (yellow card) 90'	Stadium: Şükrü Saracoğlu Stadium; Referee: Bülent Yıldırım; Assistant referees: Ekrem Kan, Kemal Yılmaz; Fourth official: Ümit Öztürk

2 April 2018 27	Kayserispor	0–5	Fenerbahçe	Kayseri
20:00 TRT (UTC+3)	Espinoza (yellow card) 23'; Kucher (yellow card) 64'	Report	Soldado 8', 44'; Chahechouhe 12', (yellow card) 55'; Kaldırım (yellow card) 26'; Özbayraklı 58'; Giuliano 86'	Stadium: Kadir Has Stadium; Referee: Ümit Öztürk; Assistant referees: İsmail Şencan, Asım Yusuf Öz; Fourth official: Serkan Tokat

8 April 2018 28	Fenerbahçe	2–0	Osmanlıspor	Istanbul
19:00 TRT (UTC+3)	Dirar (yellow card) 42'; Škrtel 54'; Soldado 60'	Report	Çağıran (yellow card) 45'; Bayır (yellow card) 62'	Stadium: Şükrü Saracoğlu Stadium; Referee: Halil Umut Meler; Assistant referees: Kerem Ersoy, Cevdet Kömürcüoğlu; Fourth official: Mustafa Öğretmenoğlu

14 April 2018 29	Sivasspor	1–2	Fenerbahçe	Sivas
19:00 TRT (UTC+3)	Bjärsmyr (yellow card) 43'; N'Dinga (yellow card) 77'; Robinho (yellow card) 88', (goal) 90'	Report	Škrtel (yellow card) 6'; Chahechouhe 30'; Medjani 33' (o.g.); Ekici (yellow card) 74'	Stadium: New Sivas 4 Eylül Stadium; Referee: Ali Palabıyık; Assistant referees: Kemal Yılmaz, Serkan Olguncan; Fourth official: Serkan Tokat

23 April 2018 30	Fenerbahçe	4–1	Antalyaspor	Istanbul
20:00 TRT (UTC+3)	Chahechouhe 14'; Soldado 20'; Topal (yellow card) 61'; Giuliano 62'; Valbuena 90'	Report	Djourou (yellow card) 23'; Doukara 36'; Charles (yellow card) 78'	Stadium: Şükrü Saracoğlu Stadium; Referee: Yaşar Kemal Uğurlu; Assistant referees: Erdinç Sezertam, Serkan Çimen; Fourth official: Koray Gençerler

28 April 2018 31	Kasımpaşa	1–4	Fenerbahçe	Istanbul
19:00 TRT (UTC+3)	Škrtel 52' (o.g.); Birniçan (yellow card) 74'	Report	Souza 31'; Potuk (yellow card) 60'; Özbayraklı 64'; Valbuena 74'; Janssen 90+4'	Stadium: Recep Tayyip Erdoğan Stadium; Referee: Cüneyt Çakır; Assistant referees: Bahattin Duran, Tarık Ongun; Fourth official: Barış Şimşek

6 May 2018 32	Fenerbahçe	2–1	Bursaspor	Istanbul
16:00 TRT (UTC+3)	Topal (yellow card) 54'; Valbuena (yellow card) 62'; Sow 72' (o.g.); Fernandão 90'	Report	Soyalp (yellow card) 23', (goal) 69'; Batalla (yellow card) 55'; Titi (red card) 83'; Kanatsızkuş (red card) 84'	Stadium: Şükrü Saracoğlu Stadium; Referee: Fırat Aydınus; Assistant referees: Serkan Ok, Aleks Taşçıoğlu; Fourth official: Bahattin Şimşek

14 May 2018 33	Karabükspor	0–7	Fenerbahçe	Karabük
20:00 TRT (UTC+3)	Kage (yellow card) 23'; Akbulut (yellow card) 80'	Report	Kravchenko 2' (o.g.); Škrtel (yellow card) 12'; Fernandão 20', 29'; Chahechouhe 38'; Soldado 47'; Dirar (yellow card) 68', (goal) 77'; Janssen 90'	Stadium: Dr. Necmettin Şeyhoğlu Stadium; Referee: Hüseyin Göçek; Assistant referees: Alpaslan Dedeş, Erdem Bayık; Fourth official: Koray Gençerler

19 May 2018 34	Fenerbahçe	3–2	Konyaspor	Istanbul
19:00 TRT (UTC+3)	Fernandão 28'; Ay 34' (o.g.); Soldado 65' (pen.)	Report	Turan (yellow card) 46'; Ay (yellow card) 61'; Fofana 70', (yellow card) 82'; Jahović 73'	Stadium: Şükrü Saracoğlu Stadium; Referee: Ali Palabıyık; Assistant referees: Kerem Ersoy, Serkan Olguncan; Fourth official: Yaşar Kemal Uğurlu

=== Turkish Cup ===
==== Fifth round ====
29 November 2017 First leg	Fenerbahçe	6–0	Adana Demirspor	Istanbul
20:30 TRT (UTC+3)	Potuk 23', 51', 66'; Janssen 26'; Kaldırım 45'; Köse 90' (pen.)	Report	İncedemir (yellow card) 35'; Douhadji (yellow card) 67' (yellow-red card) 88'; Kartal (yellow card) 67'; Mendy (yellow card) 87'	Stadium: Şükrü Saracoğlu Stadium; Referee: Ali Şansalan; Assistant referees: İbrahim Çağlar Uyarcan, Abdullah Bora Özkara; Fourth official: Ramazan Keleş

13 December 2017 Second leg	Adana Demirspor	1–4 (1–10 agg.)	Fenerbahçe	Adana
20:30 TRT (UTC+3)	Kartal (yellow card) 26'; Mendy 34'	Report	Fernandão 24', 44'; Chahechouhe 57'; Valbuena 68'	Stadium: 5 Ocak Stadium; Referee: Tugay Kaan Numanoğlu; Assistant referees: Serkan Gençerler, Engin Erdem; Fourth official: Alper Çetin

==== Round of 16 ====
27 December 2017 First leg	Fenerbahçe	2–0	İstanbulspor	Istanbul
20:30 TRT (UTC+3)	Škrtel (yellow card) 12'; Soldado 78', 89'	Report	Čajić (yellow card) 5'; Çelik (yellow card) 75'	Stadium: Şükrü Saracoğlu Stadium; Referee: Arda Kardeşler; Assistant referees: Kerem Ersoy, Osman Gökhan Bilir; Fourth official: Kutluhan Bilgiç

16 January 2018 Second leg	İstanbulspor	0–1 (0–3 agg.)	Fenerbahçe	Istanbul
20:30 TRT (UTC+3)	Ergün (yellow card) 88'	Report	Giuliano 89'	Stadium: Atatürk Olympic Stadium; Referee: Bahattin Şimşek; Assistant referees: Baki Tuncay Akkın, Ali Saygın Ögel; Fourth official: Erkan Özdamar

==== Quarter-finals ====
31 January 2018 First leg	Giresunspor	1–2	Fenerbahçe	Giresun
20:30 TRT (UTC+3)	Bardakcı (yellow card) 58'; Jones Carioca 72'	Report	Güçtekin (yellow card) 3'; Topal 26', (yellow card) 80'; Köybaşı (yellow card) 88'; Fernandão 90+3' (pen.)	Stadium: Giresun Atatürk Stadium; Referee: Yaşar Kemal Uğurlu; Assistant referees: Erdinç Sezertam, Mustafa Sönmez; Fourth official: Serkan Tokat

7 February 2018 Second leg	Fenerbahçe	2–1 (2–4 agg.)	Giresunspor	Istanbul
20:30 TRT (UTC+3)	Karakoç 19'; Chahechouhe 37'; Neto (yellow card) 56'	Report	Dialiba 13'; Demir (yellow card) 39'; Abed (yellow card) 53'	Stadium: Şükrü Saracoğlu Stadium; Referee: Koray Gençerler; Assistant referees: Volkan Ahmet Narinç, İbrahim Bozbey; Fourth official: Volkan Bayarslan

==== Semi-finals ====
1 March 2018 First leg	Beşiktaş	2–2	Fenerbahçe	Istanbul
20:30 TRT (UTC+3)	Negredo 14'; Medel (yellow card) 45'; Quaresma (red card) 52'; Pepe (yellow card) 59'; Talisca 82'; Tošić (yellow card) 90+1'	Report	Soldado 17'; Potuk (yellow card) 39' (yellow-red card) 44'; Özbayraklı 45+2'; Demirel (yellow card) 45+2' (yellow-red card) 76'; Ekici (yellow card) 54'	Stadium: Vodafone Park; Referee: Fırat Aydınus; Assistant referees: Serkan Ok, Aleks Taşçıoğlu; Fourth official: Özgür Yankaya

19 April 2018 Second leg	Fenerbahçe	Canceled	Beşiktaş	Istanbul
20:30 TRT (UTC+3)	Chahechouhe (yellow card) 23'	Report	Pepe (red card) 29'; Erkin (yellow card) 30'; Tošić (yellow card) 45'	Stadium: Şükrü Saracoğlu Stadium; Referee: Mete Kalkavan; Assistant referees: Ceyhun Sesigüzel, Esat Sancaktar; Fourth official: Suat Arslanboğa
Note: The match was suspended by the referee due to a brawl in the 57th minute. The Board of the Turkish Football Federation has concluded that the match would resume on 3 May 2018, from the 57th minute, under the same conditions behind closed doors However, Beşiktaş did not go onto the pitch, announcing that they would not play the match. Then, the referee cancelled the match, with Fenerbahçe being awarded a 3–0 win.

3 May 2018 Second leg	Fenerbahçe	3–0 (5–2 agg.)	Beşiktaş	Istanbul
20:30 TRT (UTC+3)		Report		Stadium: Şükrü Saracoğlu Stadium; Referee: Mete Kalkavan; Assistant referees: Ceyhun Sesigüzel, Esat Sancaktar; Fourth official: Suat Arslanboğa
Note: Forfeited.

==== Final ====
10 May 2018 Final	Akhisarspor	3–2	Fenerbahçe	Diyarbakır
20:30 TRT (UTC+3)	Lopes 32'; Aydoğdu (yellow card) 52'; Sissoko 70'; Barbosa 81'	Report	Fernandão 56'; Souza 86'; Janssen (yellow card) 90'	Stadium: Diyarbakır Stadium; Referee: Cüneyt Çakır; Assistant referees: Bahattin Duran, Tarık Ongun; Fourth official: Barış Şimşek

=== UEFA Europa League ===
==== Third qualifying round ====
27 July 2017 First leg	Sturm Graz (Austria)	1–2	(Turkey) Fenerbahçe	Graz, Austria
19:00 CEST (UTC+2)	Lykogiannis (yellow card) 5'; Hierlander 10', (yellow card) 71'; Lovrić (yellow card) 41'	Report	Tufan (yellow card) 13'; Maresic 29' (o.g.); Neustädter 35'	Stadium: Liebenauer Stadium; Referee: Ola Hobber Nilsen (Norway); Assistant referees: Tom Harald Gronevik, Geir Oskar Isaksen

3 August 2017 Second leg	Fenerbahçe (Turkey)	1–1 (3–2 agg.)	(Austria) Sturm Graz	Istanbul
20:30 TRT (UTC+3)	Dirar 32'; Neustädter (yellow card) 67'; Potuk (yellow card) 85'	Report	Jeggo (yellow card) 23'; Huspek 66'; Maresic (yellow card) 75'	Stadium: Şükrü Saracoğlu Stadium; Referee: Robert Madley (England); Assistant referees: Constantine Hatzidakis, Marc Perry; Fourth official: Graham Scott

==== Play-off round ====
17 August 2017 First leg	Vardar (North Macedonia)	2–0	(Turkey) Fenerbahçe	Skopje, Macedonia
20:00 CEST (UTC+2)	Barseghyan 20'; Grncharov (yellow card) 51' (yellow-red card) 89'; Topal 90' (o.g.)	Report	Soldado (yellow card) 87'; Souza (red card) 90'	Stadium: Philip II Arena; Referee: Luca Banti (Italy); Assistant referees: Matteo Passeri, Fabiano Preti; Fourth official: Marco Guida

24 August 2017 Second leg	Fenerbahçe (Turkey)	1–2 (1–4 agg.)	(North Macedonia) Vardar	Istanbul
20:30 TRT (UTC+3)	Neustädter (yellow card) 17', (goal) 61'; Tufan (yellow card) 78'	Report	Jighauri 68'; Gligorov 90'	Stadium: Şükrü Saracoğlu Stadium; Referee: Daniel Stefański (Poland); Assistant referees: Marcin Boniek, Dawid Igor Golis; Fourth official: Zbigniew Dobrynin
