= 2016–17 Fenerbahçe S.K. season =

Fenerbahçe
2016–17 season
- President: Aziz Yıldırım
- Head coach: Vítor Pereira (until 15 August 2016); Dick Advocaat (from 17 August 2016)
- Stadium: Şükrü Saracoğlu Stadium
- Süper Lig: 3rd
- Turkish Cup: Semi-finals
- UEFA Champions League: Third qualifying round
- UEFA Europa League: Round of 32
- Top goalscorer: League: Moussa Sow (12); All: Moussa Sow (15)
- Highest home attendance: 44,754 vs. Galatasaray (20 November 2016, Süper Lig)
- Lowest home attendance: 7,549 vs. Akhisar Belediyespor (9 April 2017, Süper Lig)
- Average home league attendance: 16,486
Home colours	Away colours	Third colours

The 2016–17 season was Fenerbahçe's 59th consecutive season in the Süper Lig and their 110th year in existence.

== Kits ==
- Supplier: Adidas
- Main sponsor: Nesine.com
- Main sponsor (Europe): Borajet Airlines
- Back sponsor: Halley
- Sleeve sponsor: Coca-Cola
- Short sponsor: Integral Forex
- Socks sponsor: Astra Group

Home	Away	Third

== Transfers ==
=== In ===
No.	Pos.	Nat.	Name	Age	Moving from	Type	Transfer window	Ends	Transfer fee	Source
92	MF	(Morocco)	Aatif Chahechouhe	29	(Turkey) Sivasspor	Transfer	Summer	2019	Free	Fenerbahce.org
23	RB	(Netherlands)	Gregory van der Wiel	28	(France) Paris Saint-Germain	Transfer	Summer	2020	Free	Fenerbahce.org
33	CB	(Russia)	Roman Neustädter	28	(Germany) Schalke 04	Transfer	Summer	2019	Free	Fenerbahce.org
22	LB	(Turkey)	İsmail Köybaşı	27	(Turkey) Beşiktaş	Transfer	Summer	2019	Free	Fenerbahce.org
37	CB	(Slovakia)	Martin Škrtel	31	(England) Liverpool	Transfer	Summer	2019	€6.00M	Fenerbahce.org
40	GK	(Brazil)	Fabiano	28	(Portugal) Porto	Loan	Summer	2017	Free	Fenerbahce.org
77	MF	(Netherlands)	Jeremain Lens	28	(England) Sunderland	Loan	Summer	2017	Free	Fenerbahce.org
17	FW	(Senegal)	Moussa Sow	30	(United Arab Emirates) Al-Ahli	Loan	Summer	2017	Free	Fenerbahce.org
	DF	(Turkey)	Berkay Can	22	(Turkey) Karşıyaka	End of loan	Summer	2018	Free	
29	FW	(Nigeria)	Emmanuel Emenike	28	(England) West Ham United	End of loan	Summer	2018	Free	
	MF	(Turkey)	Gökay Iravul	23	(Turkey) Alanyaspor	End of loan	Summer	2016	Free	
41	DF	(Turkey)	Hakan Çinemre	21	(Turkey) Gaziantepspor	End of loan	Summer	2018	Free	
99	MF	(Slovakia)	Miroslav Stoch	26	(Turkey) Bursaspor	End of loan	Summer	2018	Free	
48	MF	(Turkey)	Salih Uçan	21	(Italy) Roma	End of loan	Summer	2019	Free	
	MF	(Sweden)	Samuel Holmén	31	(Turkey) Konyaspor	End of loan	Summer	2016	Free	
11	MF	(Ukraine)	Oleksandr Karavayev	24	(Ukraine) Shakhtar Donetsk	Loan	Winter	2017	€0.10M	

=== Out ===
No.	Pos.	Nat.	Name	Age	Moving to	Type	Transfer window	Transfer fee	Source
10	MF	(Brazil)	Diego	31	(Brazil) Flamengo	Transfer	Summer	Free	flamengo.com.br
17	MF	(Portugal)	Nani	29	(Spain) Valencia	Transfer	Summer	€8.50M	valenciacf.com
16	CB	(Turkey)	Berkay Can	22	(Turkey) Şanlıurfaspor	Loan	Summer	Free	
41	CB	(Turkey)	Hakan Çinemre	22	(Turkey) Eskişehirspor	Loan	Summer	Free	
54	GK	(Turkey)	Erten Ersu	22	(Turkey) Gaziantepspor	Loan	Summer	Free	
22	CB	(Portugal)	Bruno Alves	34	(Italy) Cagliari	End of contract	Summer	Free	cagliaricalcio.com
88	LB	(Turkey)	Caner Erkin	27	(Italy) Inter	End of contract	Summer	Free	inter.it
	MF	(Turkey)	Gökay Iravul	23	(Turkey) Alanyaspor	End of contract	Summer	Free	
77	RB	(Turkey)	Gökhan Gönül	31	(Turkey) Beşiktaş	End of contract	Summer	Free	bjk.com
38	MF	(Turkey)	Mehmet Topuz	32		End of contract	Summer	Free	
24	LB	(Czech Republic)	Michal Kadlec	31	(Czech Republic) Sparta Prague	End of contract	Summer	Free	sparta.cz
14	MF	(Portugal)	Raul Meireles	32		End of contract	Summer	Free	
	MF	(Sweden)	Samuel Holmén	31	(Turkey) İstanbul Başakşehir	End of contract	Summer	Free	ibfk.com
	CB	(Turkey)	Serdar Kesimal	27	(Turkey) Akhisar Belediyespor	End of contract	Summer	Free	akhisarspor.com
53	CB	(Senegal)	Abdoulaye Ba	25	(Portugal) Porto	End of loan	Summer	Free	fenerbahce.org
40	GK	(Brazil)	Fabiano	28	(Portugal) Porto	End of loan	Summer	Free	fenerbahce.org
50	MF	(Serbia)	Lazar Marković	22	(England) Liverpool	End of loan	Summer	Free	fenerbahce.org

Total spending: ▼€6.10M
Total income: ▲€8.50M
Expenditure: ▲€2.40M

== First team squad ==
No.	Name	Position (s)	Nationality	Place of Birth	Date of Birth (Age)	Club caps	Club goals	Signed from	Date signed	Fee	Contract End
Goalkeepers
1	Volkan Demirel	GK	(Turkey)	Istanbul	27 October 1981 (aged 35)	434	0	Kartalspor	6 August 2002	Free	30 June 2017
13	Ertuğrul Taşkıran	GK	(Turkey)	Istanbul	5 November 1989 (aged 27)	5	0	Academy	1 July 2010	Trainee	30 June 2019
40	Fabiano	GK	(Brazil)	Mundo Novo, Brazil	29 February 1988 (aged 29)	21	0	(Portugal) Porto	12 July 2016	Free	30 June 2017
Defenders
3	Hasan Ali Kaldırım	LB	(Turkey)	Neuwied, Germany	9 December 1989 (aged 27)	130	3	Kayserispor	1 July 2012	€3,750,000	30 June 2017
4	Simon Kjær	CB	(Denmark)	Horsens, Denmark	26 March 1989 (aged 28)	68	5	(France) Lille	17 June 2015	€7,650,000	30 June 2019
19	Şener Özbayraklı	RB	(Turkey)	Borçka	23 January 1990 (aged 27)	50	2	Bursaspor	23 June 2015	€1,630,000	30 June 2019
22	İsmail Köybaşı	LB/RB	(Turkey)	İskenderun	10 July 1989 (aged 27)	13	2	Beşiktaş	14 July 2016	Free	30 June 2019
23	Gregory van der Wiel	RB	(Netherlands)	Amsterdam, Netherlands	3 February 1988 (aged 29)	12	0	(France) Paris Saint-Germain	4 July 2016	Free	30 June 2020
33	Roman Neustädter	CB/DM	(Russia)	Dnipropetrovsk, Soviet Union	18 February 1988 (aged 29)	21	0	(Germany) Schalke 04	6 July 2016	Free	30 June 2019
37	Martin Škrtel	CB	(Slovakia)	Handlová, Slovakia	15 December 1984 (aged 32)	27	2	(England) Liverpool	15 July 2016	€6,000,000	30 June 2019
Midfielders
5	Mehmet Topal	DM/CB	(Turkey)	Malatya	3 March 1986 (aged 31)	198	15	(Spain) Valencia	1 July 2012	€4,500,000	30 June 2020
6	Souza	DM/CM	(Brazil)	Rio de Janeiro, Brazil	11 February 1989 (aged 28)	70	6	(Brazil) São Paulo	7 July 2015	€8,000,000	30 June 2019
7	Alper Potuk	LW/AM/RW	(Turkey)	Afyonkarahisar	8 April 1991 (aged 26)	136	10	Eskişehirspor	22 May 2013	€6,250,000	30 June 2018
8	Ozan Tufan	DM/CM/AM	(Turkey)	Orhaneli	23 March 1995 (aged 22)	63	3	Bursaspor	13 August 2015	€7,000,000	30 June 2020
11	Oleksandr Karavayev	RW/RB/LW	(Ukraine)	Kherson, Ukraine	6 February 1992 (aged 25)	0	0	(Ukraine) Shakhtar Donetsk	4 January 2017	€100,000	30 June 2017
15	Uygar Mert Zeybek	CM/AM	(Turkey)	Osmangazi	4 June 1995 (aged 21)	19	1	Academy	1 July 2015	Trainee	30 June 2020
20	Volkan Şen	LW/RW	(Turkey)	Bursa	7 July 1987 (aged 29)	61	7	Bursaspor	14 August 2015	€1,000,000	30 June 2018
28	Ramazan Civelek	RW	(Turkey)	Istanbul	22 January 1996 (aged 21)	17	4	Academy	1 July 2016	Trainee	30 June 2020
48	Salih Uçan	AM/CM	(Turkey)	Marmaris	6 January 1994 (aged 23)	56	4	Bucaspor	1 July 2012	€1,550,000	30 June 2019
77	Jeremain Lens	RW/LW	(Netherlands)	Amsterdam, Netherlands	24 November 1987 (aged 29)	13	3	(England) Sunderland	30 August 2016	Free	30 June 2017
92	Aatif Chahechouhe	LW/AM	(Morocco)	Fontenay-aux-Roses, France	2 July 1986 (aged 30)	15	4	Sivasspor	1 July 2016	Free	30 June 2019
99	Miroslav Stoch	LW/RW	(Slovakia)	Nitra, Slovakia	19 October 1989 (aged 27)	116	20	(England) Chelsea	1 July 2010	€5,500,000	30 June 2018
Forwards
9	Fernandão	ST	(Brazil)	Rio de Janeiro, Brazil	27 March 1987 (aged 30)	68	33	(Brazil) Atlético Paranaense	25 June 2015	€3,400,000	30 June 2019
10	Robin van Persie	ST/AM	(Netherlands)	Rotterdam, Netherlands	6 August 1983 (aged 33)	66	29	(England) Manchester United	14 July 2015	€5,500,000	30 June 2018
17	Moussa Sow	ST/LW/RW	(Senegal)	Mantes-la-Jolie, France	19 January 1986 (aged 31)	160	68	(United Arab Emirates) Al-Ahli	31 August 2016	Free	30 June 2017
29	Emmanuel Emenike	ST/RW	(Nigeria)	Aguleri, Nigeria	10 May 1987 (aged 30)	86	24	(Russia) Spartak Moscow	10 August 2013	€13,000,000	30 June 2018

== Statistics ==
No	Nat.	Player	Süper Lig				Turkish Cup				Europe				Toplam			
No	Nat.	Player	Maç	Goal	Booked	Sent off (straight red)	Maç	Goal	Booked	Sent off (straight red)	Maç	Goal	Booked	Sent off (straight red)	Maç	Goal	Booked	Sent off (straight red)
1	(Turkey)	Volkan Demirel	21	0	2	0	1	0	0	0	10	0	2	0	32	0	4	0
3	(Turkey)	Hasan Ali Kaldırım	20	0	5	0	2	0	0	0	11	0	3	0	33	0	8	0
4	(Denmark)	Simon Kjær	19	1	2	1	2	0	0	0	11	2	1	0	33	3	3	1
5	(Turkey)	Mehmet Topal	21	4	7	1	2	0	1	0	11	0	0	0	34	4	8	1
6	(Brazil)	Souza	22	2	4	0	2	0	0	0	10	1	4	0	34	3	8	0
7	(Turkey)	Alper Potuk	21	1	6	0	3	0	1	0	9	0	1	0	33	1	8	0
8	(Turkey)	Ozan Tufan	16	3	3	0	7	0	2	0	7	0	1	0	30	3	6	0
9	(Brazil)	Fernandão	13	4	2	0	6	7	0	0	6	1	1	0	25	12	3	0
10	(Netherlands)	Robin van Persie	18	6	2	0	2	3	1	0	7	1	0	0	27	10	3	0
11	(Ukraine)	Oleksandr Karavayev	3	0	1	0	2	1	0	0	0	0	0	0	5	1	1	0
13	(Turkey)	Ertuğrul Taşkıran	0	0	0	0	0	0	0	0	2	0	0	0	2	0	0	0
15	(Turkey)	Uygar Mert Zeybek	0	0	0	0	0	0	0	0	0	0	0	0	0	0	0	0
17	(Senegal)	Moussa Sow	17	9	1	0	2	0	0	0	7	2	1	0	26	11	2	0
19	(Turkey)	Şener Özbayraklı	17	0	1	0	3	0	2	0	7	0	1	0	27	0	4	0
20	(Turkey)	Volkan Şen	20	0	3	0	0	0	0	0	5	0	1	0	25	0	4	0
22	(Turkey)	İsmail Köybaşı	10	2	2	0	6	0	1	2	5	0	1	0	21	2	4	2
23	(Netherlands)	Gregory van der Wiel	9	0	2	0	1	0	0	0	5	0	0	0	15	0	2	0
29	(Nigeria)	Emmanuel Emenike	10	3	1	0	1	0	1	0	10	4	1	0	21	7	3	0
33	(Russia)	Roman Neustädter	15	0	1	0	5	0	2	0	8	0	1	0	28	0	4	0
37	(Slovakia)	Martin Škrtel	24	2	5	0	4	1	0	0	11	0	4	0	39	3	9	0
40	(Brazil)	Fabiano	4	0	0	0	7	0	0	0	1	0	0	0	12	0	0	0
48	(Turkey)	Salih Uçan	8	0	1	0	6	1	2	0	6	0	0	0	20	1	3	0
77	(Netherlands)	Jeremain Lens	17	3	5	0	2	0	1	0	5	1	1	0	24	4	7	0
92	(Morocco)	Aatif Chahechouhe	13	4	1	0	5	0	0	0	4	1	0	0	22	5	1	0
99	(Slovakia)	Miroslav Stoch	6	0	3	0	6	1	2	0	6	4	0	0	18	5	5	0
5 January 2017

== Overall ==
Trophy	Started round	First match	Last match	Result
Süper Lig	Matchday 1	21 August 2016	4 June 2017	3rd
Türkiye Kupası	Group Stage	30 November 2016	17 May 2017	Semi-finals
UEFA Champions League	Third qualifying round	27 July 2016	3 August 2016	Third qualifying round
UEFA Europa League	Play-off round	18 August 2016	22 February 2017	Round of 32

== Pre-season and friendlies ==
Win Draw Loss Postponed

=== Pre-season ===
3 July 2016 Training	Fenerbahçe (Turkey)	0–3	(Iran) Gostaresh Foulad	Düzce
17:00 EEST		Report	Shojaeian 44' (pen.); Seyedi 73', 75'	Stadium: Topuk Yaylası

6 July 2016 Training	Fenerbahçe (Turkey)	2–2	(Romania) CSMS Iași	Düzce
17:00 EEST	Civelek 55', 84'	Report	Enescu 10'; Țigănașu 30'	Stadium: Topuk Yaylası

9 July 2016 Training	Fenerbahçe (Turkey)	3–1	(Romania) Voluntari	Düzce
18:00 EEST	Emenike 13'; Civelek 60'; Okutan 85'	Report	Koné 89' (pen.)	Stadium: 18 Temmuz Stadium

13 July 2016 Friendly	Fenerbahçe (Turkey)	2–1	(Greece) Panathinaikos	Istanbul
21:00 EEST	Emenike 3', 54'	Report	Berg 23'	Stadium: Ülker Stadium

16 July 2016 Friendly	Fenerbahçe (Turkey)	Cancelled	(France) Lyon	Istanbul
21:45 EEST		Report		Stadium: Ülker Stadium
Note: The match was canceled due to the events of 15 July 2016.

19 July 2016 Friendly	Sparta Prague (Czech Republic)	0–0	(Turkey) Fenerbahçe	Prague
21:00 EEST		Report		Stadium: Generali Arena

22 July 2016 Friendly	Fenerbahçe (Turkey)	1–1	(Saudi Arabia) Al Faisaly	Istanbul
21:00 EEST	Stoch (pen.)		Stum	Stadium: Ülker Stadium

=== Mid-season ===
8 January 2017 Friendly	Fenerbahçe (Turkey)	5–1	(Turkey) Denizlispor	Antalya
19:00 TRT	Fernandão 6', 18', 83'; Karavayev 43'; Uçan 53'	Report	Moritz 64' (pen.)	Stadium: Akdeniz University Stadium

11 January 2017 Friendly	Fenerbahçe (Turkey)	3–1	(Albania) Partizani	Antalya
20:00 TRT	Tufan 5'; Fernandão 8'; Köybaşı 81'	Report	Ekuban 83'	Stadium: Akdeniz University Stadium

== Süper Lig ==
=== League table ===
Pos	Team	Pld	W	D	L	GF	GA	GD	Pts	Qualification or relegation
1	Beşiktaş (C)	34	23	8	3	73	30	+43	77	Qualification for the Champions League group stage
2	Başakşehir	34	21	10	3	63	28	+35	73	Qualification for the Champions League third qualifying round
3	Fenerbahçe	34	18	10	6	60	32	+28	64 (Note: Fenerbahçe ahead of Galatasaray on head-to-head points: Fenerbahçe 6 pts, Galatasaray 0 pts.)	Qualification for the Europa League third qualifying round
4	Galatasaray	34	20	4	10	65	40	+25	64	Qualification for the Europa League second qualifying round
5	Antalyaspor	34	17	7	10	47	40	+7	58	

Source: Süper Lig, Soccerway
Rules for classification: 1) Points; 2) Head-to-head points; 3) Head-to-head goal difference; 4) Head-to-head goals scored; 5) Goal difference; 6) Goals scored; 7) Play-off.
(C) Champions

=== Results summary ===
Overall								Home						Away					
Pld	W	D	L	GF	GA	GD	Pts	W	D	L	GF	GA	GD	W	D	L	GF	GA	GD
34	18	10	6	60	32	+28	64	8	6	3	28	15	+13	10	4	3	32	17	+15

Pld = Matches played; W = Matches won; D = Matches drawn; L = Matches lost; GF = Goals for; GA = Goals against; GD = Goal difference; Pts = Points

=== Results by round ===
Round	1	2	3	4	5	6	7	8	9	10	11	12	13	14	15	16	17	18	19	20	21	22	23	24	25	26	27	28	29	30	31	32	33	34
Ground	A	H	H	A	H	A	H	A	H	A	H	A	H	A	H	A	H	H	A	A	H	A	H	A	H	A	H	A	H	A	H	A	H	A
Result	L	D	L	W	W	D	D	W	W	W	W	W	D	L	W	W	D	W	L	D	D	D	W	W	L	W	W	W	W	D	L	W	D	W
Position	13	13	16	10	7	9	9	5	5	5	3	3	4	4	4	4	4	4	4	4	4	4	4	4	4	4	3	3	3	3	3	3	3	3

A = Away; H = Home; W = Win; D = Draw; L = Loss

==== Matches ====
Win Draw Loss Postponed

21 August 2016 1	İstanbul Başakşehir	1–0	Fenerbahçe	Istanbul
21:45 EEST	Mossoró 3'	Report		Stadium: Başakşehir Fatih Terim Stadium; Attendance: 5,387; Referee: Ali Palabıyık

28 August 2016 2	Fenerbahçe	3–3	Kayserispor	Istanbul
21:45 EEST	Kjær 30'; Tufan 44'; Potuk 90'	Report	Welliton 27', 45'; Budak 90'	Stadium: Ülker Stadium; Attendance: 11,413; Referee: Serkan Çınar

11 September 2016 3	Fenerbahçe	0–1	Bursaspor	Istanbul
20:00 TRT		Report	Batalla 33'	Stadium: Ülker Stadium; Attendance: 22,335; Referee: Bülent Yıldırım

19 September 2016 4	Kasımpaşa	1–5	Fenerbahçe	Istanbul
20:00 TRT	Torun 57' (pen.)	Report	Souza 11'; Tufan 20'; Emenike 45'; Sow 73'; Köybaşı 84'	Stadium: Recep Tayyip Erdoğan Stadium; Attendance: 3,177; Referee: Hüseyin Göçek

25 September 2016 5	Fenerbahçe	2–1	Gaziantepspor	Istanbul
19:00 TRT	Emenike 22'; Souza 86'	Report	Ghilas 80'	Stadium: Ülker Stadium; Attendance: 15,047; Referee: Fırat Aydınus

2 October 2016 6	Osmanlıspor	1–1	Fenerbahçe	Ankara
19:00 TRT	Ndiaye 9' (pen.)	Report	Van Persie 55'	Stadium: Osmanlı Stadyumu; Attendance: 6,300; Referee: Mete Kalkavan

16 October 2016 7	Fenerbahçe	1–1	Alanyaspor	Istanbul
16:00 TRT	Topal 36'	Report	Candeias 58'	Stadium: Ülker Stadium; Attendance: 18,903; Referee: Alper Ulusoy

24 October 2016 8	Konyaspor	0–1	Fenerbahçe	Konya
20:00 TRT		Report	Emenike 25' (pen.)	Stadium: Konya Büyükşehir Stadium; Attendance: 27,583; Referee: Bülent Yıldırım

30 October 2016 9	Fenerbahçe	5–0	Karabükspor	Istanbul
19:00 TRT	Van Persie 18' (pen.), 47'; Škrtel 45'; Chahechouhe 52'; Lens 53'	Report		Stadium: Ülker Stadium; Attendance: 14,283; Referee: Fırat Aydınus

6 November 2016 10	Akhisar Belediyespor	1–3	Fenerbahçe	Manisa
19:00 TRT	Rodallega 90'	Report	Van Persie 26'; Chahechouhe 65'; Öztürk 77' (o.g.)	Stadium: Manisa 19 Mayıs Stadium; Attendance: 5,223; Referee: Halil Umut Meler

20 November 2016 11	Fenerbahçe	2–0	Galatasaray	Istanbul
20:00 TRT	Van Persie 45', 78' (pen.)	Report		Stadium: Ülker Stadium; Attendance: 44,754; Referee: Cüneyt Çakır

27 November 2016 12	Rizespor	1–5	Fenerbahçe	Rize
19:00 TRT	Yacoubi 17'	Report	Sow 27', 32', 45'; Chahechouhe 66'; Köybaşı 90'	Stadium: Yeni Rize Şehir Stadı; Attendance: 5,857; Referee: Ali Palabıyık

3 December 2016 13	Fenerbahçe	0–0	Beşiktaş	Istanbul
19:00 TRT		Report		Stadium: Ülker Stadium; Attendance: 43,209; Referee: Hüseyin Göçek

12 December 2016 14	Antalyaspor	1–0	Fenerbahçe	Antalya
20:00 TRT	Kurtuluş 65'	Report		Stadium: Antalya Arena; Attendance: 15,514; Referee: Cüneyt Çakır

19 December 2016 15	Fenerbahçe	3–0	Gençlerbirliği	Istanbul
20:00 TRT	Sow 41', 90'; Fernandão 87'	Report		Stadium: Ülker Stadium; Attendance: 7,946; Referee: Fırat Aydınus

26 December 2016 16	Trabzonspor	0–3	Fenerbahçe	Trabzon
20:00 TRT		Report	Fernandão 28' (pen.); Sow 40'; Lens 66'	Stadium: Hüseyin Avni Aker Stadium; Attendance: 19,695; Referee: Ali Palabıyık

15 January 2017 17	Fenerbahçe	2–2	Adanaspor	Istanbul
19:00 TRT	Topal 40'; Fernandão 78' (pen.)	Report	Gueye 23'; Ronei 45'	Stadium: Ülker Stadium; Attendance: 10,236; Referee: Serkan Çınar

22 January 2017 18	Fenerbahçe	1–0	İstanbul Başakşehir	Istanbul
19:00 TRT	Tufan 28'	Report		Stadium: Ülker Stadium; Attendance: 22,598; Referee: Bülent Yıldırım

29 January 2017 19	Kayserispor	4–1	Fenerbahçe	Kayseri
19:00 TRT	Bulut 32'; Vural 70', 90'; Welliton 88'	Report	Topal 41'	Stadium: Kadir Has Stadium; Attendance: 8,045; Referee: Mete Kalkavan

11 February 2017 20	Bursaspor	1–1	Fenerbahçe	Bursa
19:00 TRT	Batalla 88' (pen.)	Report	Sow 22' (pen.)	Stadium: Timsah Arena; Attendance: 33,622; Referee: Halil Umut Meler

19 February 2017 21	Fenerbahçe	0–0	Kasımpaşa	Istanbul
15:00 TRT		Report		Stadium: Ülker Stadium; Attendance: 12,107; Referee: Fırat Aydınus

26 February 2017 22	Gaziantepspor	1–1	Fenerbahçe	Gaziantep
19:00 TRT	Yılmaz 11'	Report	Lens 23'	Stadium: Gaziantep Arena; Attendance: 11,851; Referee: Yaşar Kemal Uğurlu

5 March 2017 23	Fenerbahçe	1–0	Osmanlıspor	Istanbul
19:00 TRT	Topal 90'	Report		Stadium: Ülker Stadium; Attendance: 12,153; Referee: Alper Ulusoy

10 March 2017 24	Alanyaspor	2–3	Fenerbahçe	Antalya
20:00 TRT	Fernándes 2'; Vágner Love 15'	Report	Omeruo 32' (o.g.); Fernandão 29'; Chahechouhe 58'	Stadium: Alanya Oba Stadium; Attendance: 6,211; Referee: Ali Palabıyık

17 March 2017 25	Fenerbahçe	2–3	Konyaspor	Istanbul
20:00 TRT	Škrtel 20'; Sow 72'	Report	Bajić 17', 22'; Şahiner 54'	Stadium: Ülker Stadium; Attendance: 9,311; Referee: Fırat Aydınus

1 April 2017 26	Karabükspor	0–1	Fenerbahçe	Karabük
19:00 TRT		Report	Van Persie 54'	Stadium: Dr. Necmettin Şeyhoğlu Stadium; Attendance: 7,740; Referee: Bülent Yıldırım

9 April 2017 27	Fenerbahçe	3–1	Akhisar Belediyespor	Istanbul
19:00 TRT	Lopes 44' (o.g.); Souza 60'; Lens 90'	Report	Vaz Tê 50' (pen.)	Stadium: Ülker Stadium; Attendance: 7,549; Referee: Halil Umut Meler

23 April 2017 28	Galatasaray	0–1	Fenerbahçe	Istanbul
19:00 TRT		Report	Souza 90'	Stadium: Türk Telekom Arena; Attendance: 37,639; Referee: Fırat Aydınus

30 April 2017 29	Fenerbahçe	2–1	Rizespor	Istanbul
16:00 TRT	Sow 3', 90'	Report	Aynaoğlu 14'	Stadium: Ülker Stadium; Attendance: 8,514; Referee: Ali Palabıyık

7 May 2017 30	Beşiktaş	1–1	Fenerbahçe	Istanbul
19:00 TRT	Aboubakar 45'	Report	Marcelo 90' (o.g.)	Stadium: Vodafone Arena; Attendance: 38,107; Referee: Fırat Aydınus

13 May 2017 31	Fenerbahçe	0–1	Antalyaspor	Istanbul
19:00 TRT		Report	Kadah 47'	Stadium: Ülker Stadium; Attendance: 8,297; Referee: Mete Kalkavan

22 May 2017 32	Gençlerbirliği	1–2	Fenerbahçe	Ankara
20:00 TRT	Şahin 45'	Report	Van Persie 49', 75' (pen.)	Stadium: Ankara 19 Mayıs Stadium; Referee: Ümit Öztürk

27 May 2017 33	Fenerbahçe	1–1	Trabzonspor	Istanbul
19:00 TRT	Emenike (yellow card) 16'; Sow 23'; Škrtel (yellow card) 55'; Köybaşı (yellow card) 62'; Uçan (yellow card) 90+3'	Report	Bero (yellow card) 27', (goal) 54'; Castillo (yellow card) 65'; Şahan (yellow card) 71'; N'Doye (yellow card) 77'; Medjani (yellow card) 79'	Stadium: Ülker Stadium; Referee: Ali Palabıyık

3 June 2017 34	Adanaspor	1–3	Fenerbahçe	Adana
17:00 TRT	Koman 6' (pen.); Ramos (yellow card) 86'	Report	Souza 9'; Chahechouhe 22'; Emenike 90+1'	Stadium: Adana 5 Ocak Stadium; Referee: Yasar Kemal Ugurlu

== Turkish Cup ==
=== Group stage ===
==== Group C ====
Team	Pld	W	D	L	GF	GA	GD	Pts
Gençlerbirliği	6	4	1	1	20	6	+14	13
Fenerbahçe	6	3	2	1	14	5	+9	11
Menemen Belediyespor	6	2	1	3	7	15	-8	7
Amed Sportif	6	0	2	4	4	19	-15	2

===== Matches =====
Win Draw Loss Postponed

30 November 2016 1	Fenerbahçe	1–2	Gençlerbirliği	Istanbul
20:30 TRT	Güveli 24'	Report	Rantie 56'; Kahveci 77'	Stadium: Ülker Stadium; Referee: Halil Umut Meler

15 December 2016 2	Amed Sportif	1–1	Fenerbahçe	Diyarbakır
14:15 TRT	Özer 66'	Report	Fernandão 44' (pen.)	Stadium: Seyrantepe Stadium; Referee: Suat Arslanboğa

22 December 2016 3	Menemen Belediyespor	0–1	Fenerbahçe	İzmir
20:30 TRT		Report	Fernandão 22' (pen.)	Stadium: İzmir Atatürk Stadium; Referee: Arda Kardeşler

29 December 2016 4	Fenerbahçe	6–0	Menemen Belediyespor	Istanbul
20:30 TRT	Fernandão 38', 67', 77'; Škrtel 41'; Karakoç 69'; Stoch 83'	Report		Stadium: Ülker Stadium; Referee: Ümit Öztürk

18 January 2017 5	Gençlerbirliği	2–2	Fenerbahçe	Ankara
20:00 TRT	Gürler 26' (pen.); Muriqi 83'	Report	Karavayev 24'; Koca 43'	Stadium: Ankara 19 Mayıs Stadium; Referee: Ümit Öztürk

25 January 2017 6	Fenerbahçe	3–0	Amed Sportif	Istanbul
18:00 TRT	Uçan 8'; Van Persie 36', 44' (pen.)	Report		Stadium: Ülker Stadium; Referee: Özgüç Türkalp

=== Knockout phase ===
==== Round of 16 ====
Win Draw Loss Postponed

5 February 2017 Round of 16	Beşiktaş	0–1	Fenerbahçe	Istanbul
20:30 TRT		Report	Van Persie 71'	Stadium: Vodafone Park; Referee: Ali Palabıyık

==== Quarter-finals ====
Win Draw Loss Postponed

2 March 2017 First leg	Kayserispor	0–3	Fenerbahçe	Kayseri
20:30 TRT		Report	Fernandão 45', 71'; Kaş 76' (o.g.)	Stadium: Kadir Has Stadium; Referee: Ali Palabıyık

5 April 2017 Second leg	Fenerbahçe	3–0 (6–0 agg.)	Kayserispor	Istanbul
20:30 TRT	Chahechouhe 31'; Souza 35'; Şen 83'	Report		Stadium: Ülker Stadium; Referee: Ali Palabıyık

==== Semi-finals ====
Win Draw Loss Postponed

26 April 2017 First leg	İstanbul Başakşehir	2–2	Fenerbahçe	Istanbul
20:45 TRT	Ünder 7', 11'	Report	Tufan 12'; Van Persie 61'	Stadium: Başakşehir Fatih Terim Stadium; Referee: Mete Kalkavan

17 May 2017 Second leg	Fenerbahçe	2–2 (a.e.t.) (4–4 agg.) (9–10 p)	İstanbul Başakşehir	Istanbul
20:45 TRT	Sow 71'; Tufan 87'	Report	Belözoğlu 43'; Holmén 86'	Stadium: Ülker Stadium; Referee: Halil Umut Meler

== UEFA Champions League ==
=== Third qualifying round ===
Win Draw Loss Postponed

27 July 2016 First leg	Fenerbahçe (Turkey)	2–1	(France) Monaco	Istanbul, Turkey
21:30 EEST	Emenike 39', 61'	Report	Falcao 42'	Stadium: Ülker Stadium; Attendance: 12,223; Referee: Jesús Gil Manzano (Spain)

3 August 2016 Second leg	Monaco (France)	3–1 (4–3 agg.)	(Turkey) Fenerbahçe	Fontvieille, Monaco
21:45 EEST	Germain 2', 65'; Falcao 18' (pen.)	Report	Emenike 53'	Stadium: Stade Louis II; Attendance: 8,403; Referee: Artur Soares Dias (Portugal)

== UEFA Europa League ==
=== Play-off round ===
Win Draw Loss Postponed

18 August 2016 First leg	Fenerbahçe (Turkey)	3–0	(Switzerland) Grasshopper	Istanbul, Turkey
21:00 EEST	Chahechouhe 4'; Stoch 72', 90'	Report	Falcao 42'	Stadium: Ülker Stadium; Attendance: 16,280; Referee: Robert Schörgenhofer (Austria)

25 August 2016 Second leg	Grasshopper (Switzerland)	0–2 (0–5 agg.)	(Turkey) Fenerbahçe	Zürich, Switzerland
20:00 EEST		Report	Fernandão 77'; Stoch 84'	Stadium: Letzigrund; Attendance: 14,400; Referee: Danny Makkelie (Netherlands)

=== Group stage ===
Pos	Team	Pld	W	D	L	GF	GA	GD	Pts	Qualification	FEN	MU	FEY	ZOR
1	(Turkey) Fenerbahçe	6	4	1	1	8	6	+2	13	Advance to knockout phase	—	2–1	1–0	2–0
2	(England) Manchester United	6	4	0	2	12	4	+8	12	Advance to knockout phase	4–1	—	4–0	1–0
3	(Netherlands) Feyenoord	6	2	1	3	3	7	−4	7		0–1	1–0	—	1–0
4	(Ukraine) Zorya Luhansk	6	0	2	4	2	8	−6	2		1–1	0–2	1–1	—

Source: UEFA

==== Matches ====
Win Draw Loss Postponed

15 September 2016 1	Zorya Luhansk (Ukraine)	1–1	(Turkey) Fenerbahçe	Odesa, Ukraine
20:00 TRT	Hrechyshkin 52'	Report	Kjær 90'	Stadium: Chornomorets Stadium (Note: Zorya Luhansk will play their home matches at Chornomorets Stadium, Odesa instead of their regular stadium, Avanhard Stadium, Luhansk, due to the war conditions in Eastern Ukraine.); Attendance: 16,000; Referee: István Kovács (Romania)

29 September 2016 2	Fenerbahçe (Turkey)	1–0	(Netherlands) Feyenoord	Istanbul, Turkey
22:05 TRT	Emenike 18'	Report		Stadium: Ülker Stadium; Attendance: 16,500; Referee: Jonas Eriksson (Sweden)

20 October 2016 3	Manchester United (England)	4–1	(Turkey) Fenerbahçe	Manchester, England
22:05 TRT	Pogba 31' (pen.), 45'; Martial 34' (pen.); Lingard 48'	Report	Van Persie 83'	Stadium: Old Trafford; Attendance: 73,063; Referee: Benoît Bastien (France)

3 November 2016 4	Fenerbahçe (Turkey)	2–1	(England) Manchester United	Istanbul, Turkey
21:00 TRT	Sow 2'; Lens 59'	Report	Rooney 89'	Stadium: Ülker Stadium; Attendance: 35,378; Referee: Milorad Mažić (Serbia)

24 November 2016 5	Fenerbahçe (Turkey)	2–0	(Ukraine) Zorya Luhansk	Istanbul, Turkey
19:00 TRT	Stoch 59'; Kjær 67'	Report		Stadium: Ülker Stadium; Attendance: 16,145; Referee: Harald Lechner (Austria)

8 December 2016 6	Feyenoord (Netherlands)	0–1	(Turkey) Fenerbahçe	Rotterdam, Netherlands
21:00 TRT		Report	Sow 22'	Stadium: De Kuip; Attendance: 32,000; Referee: David Fernández Borbalán (Spain)

=== Round of 32 ===
Win Draw Loss Postponed

16 February 2017 First leg	Krasnodar (Russia)	1–0	(Turkey) Fenerbahçe	Krasnodar, Russia
19:00 TRT	Claesson 4'	Report		Stadium: Krasnodar Stadium; Attendance: 32,460; Referee: Ivan Kružliak (Slovakia)

22 February 2017 Second leg	Fenerbahçe (Turkey)	1–1 (1–2 agg.)	(Russia) Krasnodar	Istanbul, Turkey
20:00 TRT	Souza 41'	Report	Smolov 4'	Stadium: Ülker Stadium; Attendance: 32,000; Referee: Paweł Raczkowski (Poland)

== See also ==
- 2016–17 Süper Lig
- 2016–17 Turkish Cup
- 2016–17 UEFA Champions League
- 2016–17 UEFA Europa League
