= Oğuz Kağan Güçtekin =

Turkish footballer (born 1999)

Personal information
- Date of birth: 6 April 1999 (age 27)
- Place of birth: Mersin, Turkey
- Height: 1.74 m (5 ft 9 in)
- Position: Defensive midfielder

Team information
- Current team: Erzincanspor
- Number: 6

Youth career
- 2010–2017: Fenerbahçe

Senior career*
Years	Team	Apps	(Gls)
2017–2021	Fenerbahçe	10	(0)
2019–2020	→ Çaykur Rizespor (loan)	14	(0)
2020–2021	→ Konyaspor (loan)	20	(0)
2021–2023	Westerlo	12	(0)
2022–2023	→ Bandırmaspor (loan)	27	(0)
2023–2025	Boluspor	68	(6)
2025–2026	Iğdır	29	(0)
2026–	Erzincanspor	7	(0)

International career^{‡}
2014	Turkey U15	6	(0)
2014–2015	Turkey U16	9	(0)
2015–2016	Turkey U17	14	(0)
2016–2017	Turkey U18	5	(0)
2017–2018	Turkey U19	11	(0)
- * Club domestic league appearances and goals as of 24 October 2026 ‡ National team caps and goals as of 18:08, 26 May 2022 (UTC)

Oğuz Kağan Güçtekin (born 6 April 1999) is a Turkish professional footballer who plays as a defensive midfielder for TFF 1. Lig club Erzincanspor.

== Club career ==
Oğuz Kağan joined Fenerbahçe at the age 11 and begun as a striker, and eventually developed into a defensive sweeper. Oğuz Kağan made his professional debut for Fenerbahçe in a 4-1 Süper Lig win over Sivasspor on 19 November 2017, coming in as a substitute in the 86th minute replacing Mehmet Topal. He transferred to the Belgian club Westerlo on 27 August 2021. On 1 August 2022, Güçtekin moved to Bandırmaspor on loan.

On 8 July 2023, Oğuz Kağan signed a two-year contract with Boluspor.

== International career ==
Oğuz Kağan is a youth international for Turkey from U15 to U19 levels.

== Honours ==
Westerlo

- Belgian First Division B: 2021–22
