= Yusuf Akbulut (footballer) =

Turkish professional footballer

Personal information
- Date of birth: 19 March 1990 (age 36)
- Place of birth: Karabük, Turkey
- Height: 1.87 m (6 ft 2 in)
- Position: Forward

Youth career
- 2002–2008: Karabükspor

Senior career*
Years	Team	Apps	(Gls)
2008–2012	Karabükspor	0	(0)
2008–2009	→ 1930 Bafraspor (loan)	9	(1)
2010–2011	→ Siirtspor (loan)	30	(9)
2011–2012	→ Hatayspor (loan)	26	(5)
2012	Manavgatspor	0	(0)
2012–2013	Kilimli Belediyespor	18	(7)
2013	24 Erzincanspor	14	(2)
2013–2014	Payas Belediyespor 1975	16	(2)
2014	Van Büyükşehir Belediyespor	9	(2)
2014–2015	Orhangazispor	27	(6)
2015–2017	Yomraspor	12	(1)
2017	Derince Belediyespor	13	(3)
2017–2018	Batman Petrolspor	10	(5)
2018–2019	Karabükspor	25	(4)
2019	Kırşehir Belediyespor	9	(0)
2020–2021	Kozanspor FK	15	(5)
2021–2022	Sapanca Gençlikspor		
2022–2025	Karabük İdman Yurdu		
2025	Kastamonuspor 1966	0	(0)
- * Club domestic league appearances and goals as of 10 January 2021

Yusuf Akbulut (born 19 March 1990) is a Turkish professional footballer who plays as a forward.

== Professional career ==
Yusuf rejoined his childhood club Kardemir Karabükspor on 17 January 2018. He made his professional debut at the age of 27 with Kardemir Karabükspor, in a 2-0 Süper Lig loss to Gençlerbirliği S.K. on 20 January 2018.
