= Joseph Douhadji =

Togolese footballer

Personal information
- Full name: Joseph Yaovi Douhadji
- Date of birth: 5 December 1994 (age 31)
- Place of birth: Agbetiko, Togo
- Height: 1.88 m (6 ft 2 in)
- Position: Centre-back

Team information
- Current team: Saint-Éloi Lupopo

Youth career
- Unisport Kanyikopé

Senior career*
Years	Team	Apps	(Gls)
2012–2013	Unisport Kanyikopé		
2013	Yobo FC		
2014–2015	Dolphins		
2016–2017	Rivers United		
2017–2018	Adana Demirspor	8	(0)
2019–2020	Bidvest Wits	0	(0)
2020–2021	Black Leopards	8	(0)
2022–2023	AS OTR Lomé		
2024	Aigles du Congo		
2024–	Saint-Éloi Lupopo		

International career^{‡}
2017	Togo	4	(0)
- * Club domestic league appearances and goals ‡ National team caps and goals as of 18 February 2026

Joseph Douhadji (born 5 December 1994) is a Togolese football defender for Black Leopards and the Togo national team.
