= Mehmet Topal =

Turkish football manager and player (born 1986)

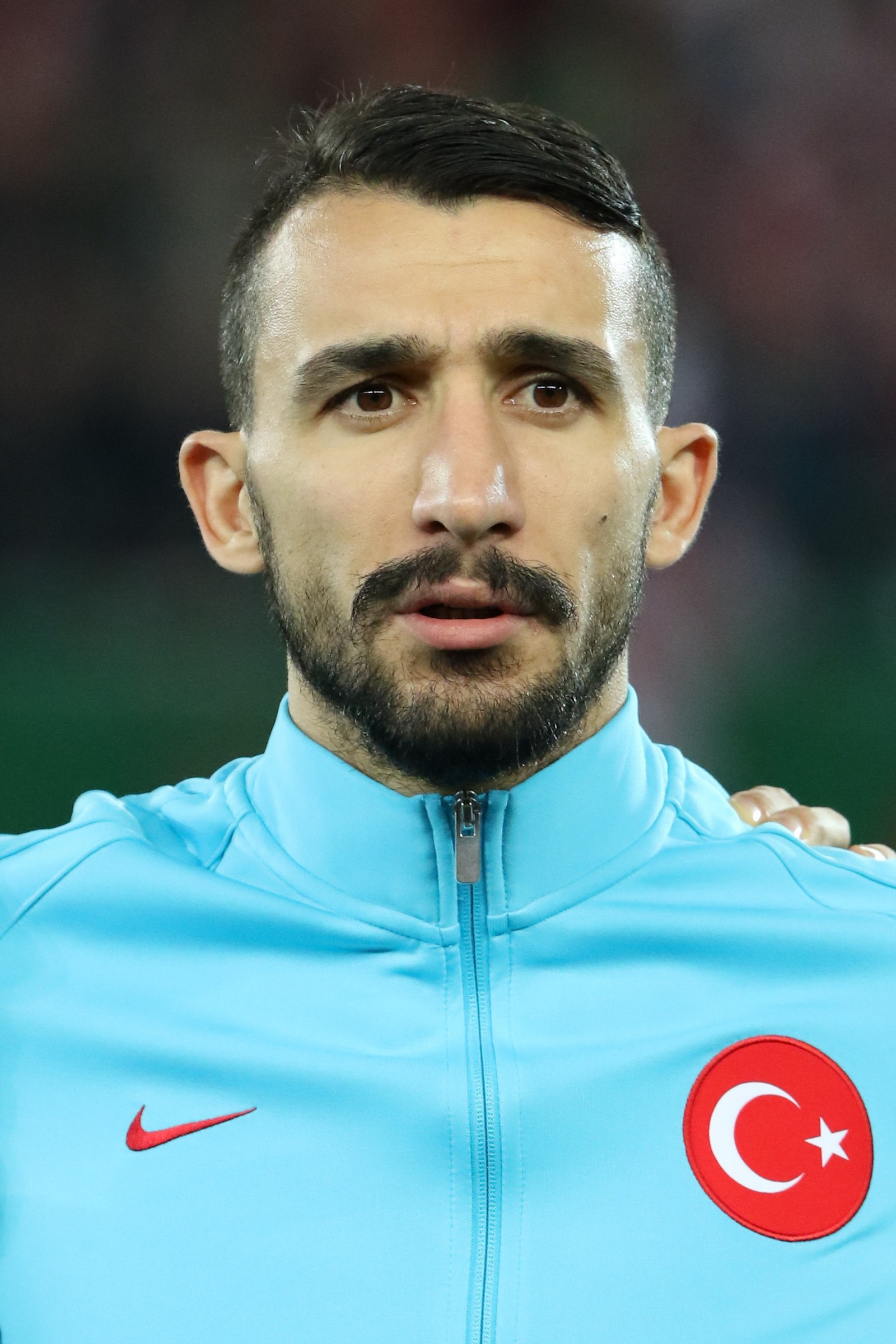
- Topal with Turkey in 2016

Personal information
- Full name: Mehmet Topal
- Date of birth: 3 March 1986 (age 40)
- Place of birth: Malatya, Turkey
- Height: 1.87 m (6 ft 2 in)
- Position: Defensive midfielder

Youth career
- 1999–2002: Malatyaspor
- 2002–2004: Dardanelspor

Senior career*
Years	Team	Apps	(Gls)
2005–2006	Dardanelspor	39	(4)
2006–2010	Galatasaray	82	(2)
2010–2012	Valencia	43	(1)
2012–2019	Fenerbahçe	206	(16)
2019–2021	İstanbul Başakşehir	50	(2)
2021–2022	Beşiktaş	7	(0)
Total		427	(25)

International career
2005	Turkey U19	1	(0)
2006	Turkey U20	1	(0)
2006–2007	Turkey U21	13	(1)
2008–2018	Turkey	81	(2)

Managerial career
- 2024: Petrolul Ploiești
- 2025: Petrolul Ploiești
- 2026: Petrolul Ploiești
Medal record
Representing Turkey
Men's Football
UEFA European Championship
Bronze medal – third place	2008 Austria-Switzerland
- * Club domestic league appearances and goals

Mehmet Topal (born 3 March 1986) is a Turkish professional football manager and former player. A defensive midfielder, he was nicknamed Örümcek (Turkish: Spider) for his ability to use his long legs to win loose balls and intercept passes.

Topal began his senior career at Dardanelspor and went on to play for Galatasaray, Valencia, Fenerbahçe, İstanbul Başakşehir, and Beşiktaş, winning seven major trophies in Turkey. He represented the Turkey national team from 2008 to 2018, making over 80 appearances and being selected for two European Championships.

As a manager, Topal made his debut with a six-month spell at Romanian club Petrolul Ploiești in 2024. He later returned to the club for the final stages of the 2024–25 and 2025–26 seasons, helping the team avoid relegation.

== Club career ==
=== Early career ===
Born in Malatya, Topal started his football career at local Malatya B.S. at the age of 13. He made his senior debut with lowly Dardanel Spor A.Ş. in the third division.

In September 2006, Topal joined Süper Lig powerhouse Galatasaray SK, moving to the club alongside Japanese Junichi Inamoto.

=== Galatasaray ===
Topal appeared in only 11 games in his first season in Istanbul. However, due to an injury to Swedish international Tobias Linderoth, he was handed his chance in the starting XI, later commenting on his teammate: "He helped me a lot, told me about the areas I should improve and how to do so. Sadly, I got my chance through his injury but I want him to recover in the shortest time possible."

In April 2008, Topal extended his contract with Gala for five years, having played 26 matches during the campaign to help the team win the national championship and also reaching the Turkey national team in that timeframe. In the 2008 summer transfer window, there were rumours surrounding a move to Everton in the Premier League, with David Moyes apparently keen to bring the player to Goodison Park.

Topal eventually stayed put, appearing in an average of 22 games in the following seasons but also having to deal with injury early into 2009–10.

=== Valencia ===
On 12 May 2010, Topal signed for Valencia CF for a fee believed to be in the region of €5.5 million. On 14 September, he made he first UEFA Champions League appearance with his new club, playing the full 90 minutes against Turkish side Bursaspor in a 4–0 group stage win.

Topal scored his first goal with the Che at Sporting de Gijón, on 25 September 2010 (2–0). In the UEFA Europa League, he netted the game's only goal away against Stoke City on 17 February 2012 in the round of 32 to take his side through 2–0 on aggregate; the 30-yard strike was widely regarded as one of the best goals of that tournament. He played six matches to help his team reach the semi-finals of the latter competition, but overall played second-fiddle to legendary David Albelda during his stint even though the former was ostracised by manager Unai Emery for a period of time.

=== Fenerbahçe ===
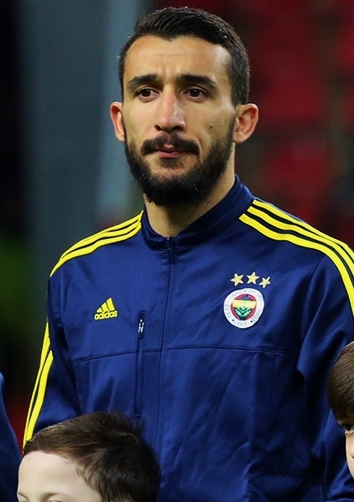
Topal with Fenerbahçe in 2016

Topal moved to Fenerbahçe SK on 1 July 2012, for a reported fee of €4.5 million. He signed a four-year contract with a €2 million annually salary, plus bonuses. He contributed 27 appearances and three goals in his second season, as the club won the national championship after a three-year wait.

On 11 August 2015, whilst he drove home after training accompanied by youth player Uygar Mert, Topal's car was shot at by unknown men. He appeared in 11 games in the Europa League round-of-16 run and, precisely at that stage, against S.C. Braga, scored the only goal in the first leg at the Şükrü Saracoğlu Stadium. In the second match, he was sent off for two bookable offences – the second of which resulted in a penalty – as his team had a further two players ejected in an eventual 4–2 aggregate loss.

On 26 June 2019, the 33-year-old Topal left by mutual consent.

=== Istanbul Başakşehir ===
On 26 August 2019, Topal joined İstanbul Başakşehir F.K. on a two-year deal, the latter one being optional. After conquering the domestic league at the end of the campaign, he became the first footballer to achieve the feat with three teams.

== International career ==
Topal earned his first cap for Turkey on 6 February 2008, coming on for Emre Belözoğlu in the 78th minute of a 0–0 friendly home draw with Sweden. Shortly after, he was selected by manager Fatih Terim for his UEFA Euro 2008 squad, playing all the games in Austria and Switzerland but one for the eventual semi-finalists.

On 22 May 2016, Topal captained the nation for the first time, in their 1–2 friendly loss to England at the City of Manchester Stadium. A week later, he scored his first international goal on his 58th cap, the only one of a last-minute victory over Montenegro in Antalya. Picked for Euro 2016, he started in all the matches, featuring as a central defender in a 0–3 group stage defeat against Spain.

== Managerial career ==
Topal started his managerial career on 6 June 2024, joining Romanian club Petrolul Ploiești on a three-year deal. He resigned on 22 December that year, leaving the team in sixth place in the Liga I after 21 fixtures—one of their best runs since returning to the top division in the 2022–23 campaign. Two days later, Petrolul Ploiești announced that his resignation had not yet been accepted and that the situation would be clarified soon. The club attributed his decision to personal reasons, a claim Topal denied on his Instagram account. The contract was officially terminated on 31 December.

== Career statistics ==
=== Club ===
Appearances and goals by club, season and competition
Club	Season	League			National cup (Note: Includes Turkish Cup, Copa del Rey)		Europe		Other		Total	
Club	Season	Division	Apps	Goals	Apps	Goals	Apps	Goals	Apps	Goals	Apps	Goals
Dardanelspor	2004–05	Lig A	9	1	—		—		—		9	1
Dardanelspor	2005–06	Lig A	30	3	1	0	—		—		31	3
Dardanelspor	Total		39	4	1	0	—		—		40	4
Galatasaray	2006–07	Süper Lig	11	0	2	0	4 (Note: Appearances in UEFA Champions League)	0	—		17	0
Galatasaray	2007–08	Süper Lig	26	1	8	1	5 (Note: Appearances in UEFA Cup)	0	—		39	2
Galatasaray	2008–09	Süper Lig	21	1	5	0	6 (Note: Two appearances in UEFA Champions League, four appearances in UEFA Cup)	0	1 (Note: Appearance in Turkish Super Cup)	0	33	1
Galatasaray	2009–10	Süper Lig	24	0	4	0	8 (Note: Appearances in UEFA Europa League)	1	—		36	1
Galatasaray	Total		82	2	19	1	23	1	1	0	125	4
Valencia	2010–11	La Liga	23	1	1	0	5	0	—		29	1
Valencia	2011–12	La Liga	20	0	1	0	9 (Note: Three appearances in Champions League, six appearances and two goals in UEFA Europa League)	2	—		30	2
Valencia	Total		43	1	2	0	14	2	—		59	3
Fenerbahçe	2012–13	Süper Lig	27	3	7	1	16	0	1	0	51	4
Fenerbahçe	2013–14	Süper Lig	27	3	1	0	3	0	1	0	32	3
Fenerbahçe	2014–15	Süper Lig	33	2	7	2	—		1	0	41	4
Fenerbahçe	2015–16	Süper Lig	33	1	7	0	13	2	—		53	3
Fenerbahçe	2016–17	Süper Lig	29	4	5	0	11	0	—		45	4
Fenerbahçe	2017–18	Süper Lig	29	2	8	1	4	0	—		41	3
Fenerbahçe	2018–19	Süper Lig	28	1	2	1	6	1	—		36	3
Fenerbahçe	Total		206	16	37	5	53	3	3	0	299	24
İstanbul Başakşehir	2019–20	Süper Lig	25	0	0	0	7	0	—		32	0
İstanbul Başakşehir	2020–21	Süper Lig	25	2	2	0	4	1	1	0	32	3
İstanbul Başakşehir	Total		50	2	2	0	11	1	1	0	64	3
Beşiktaş	2021–22	Süper Lig	7	0	0	0	3	0	0	0	10	0
Career total			427	25	61	6	104	7	5	0	597	38

=== International ===
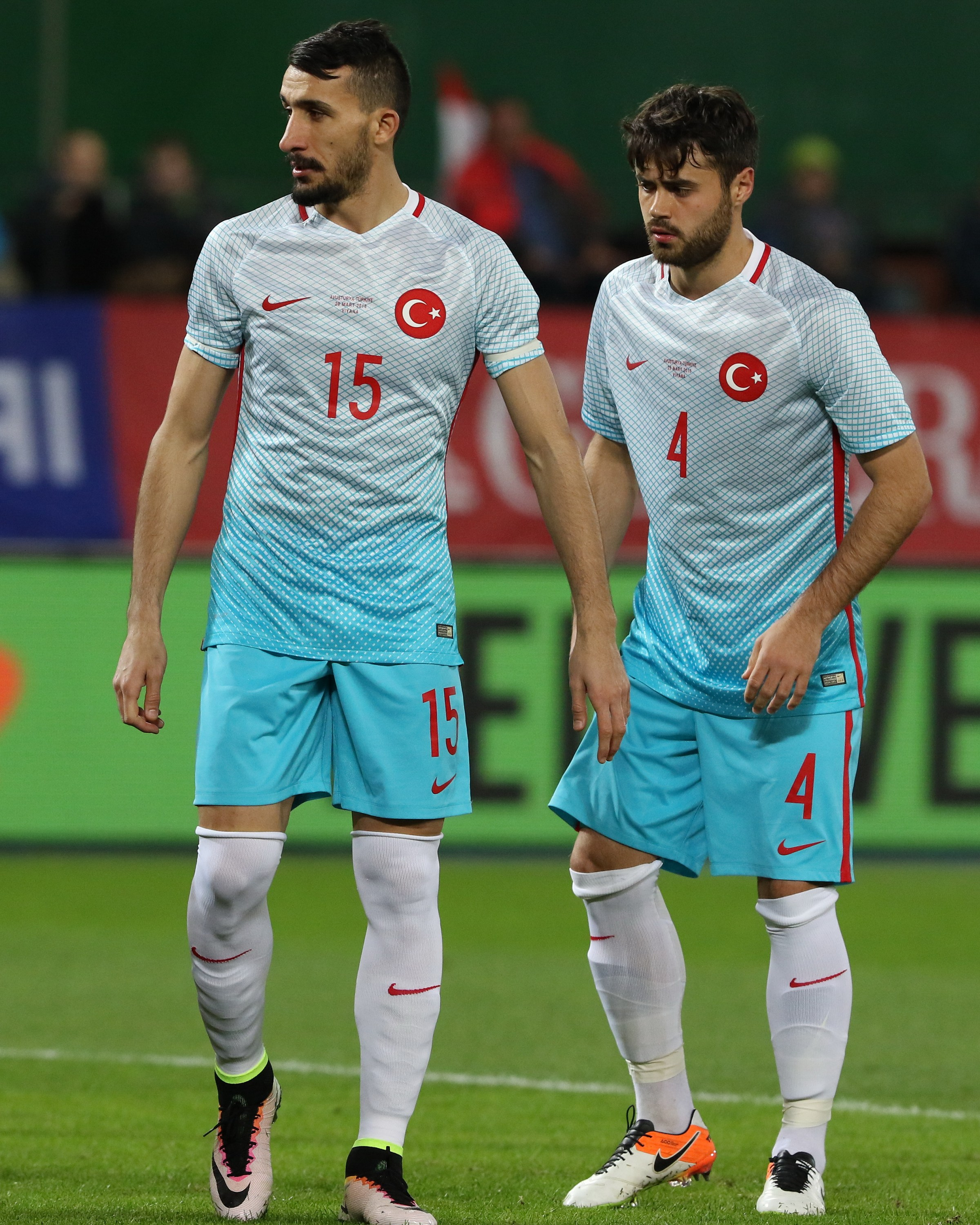
Topal (left) alongside Ahmet Yılmaz Çalık

Appearances and goals by national team and year
National team	Year	Apps	Goals
Turkey
Turkey	2008	11	0
Turkey	2009	2	0
Turkey	2010	3	0
Turkey	2011	6	0
Turkey	2012	10	0
Turkey	2013	8	0
Turkey	2014	6	0
Turkey	2015	8	0
Turkey	2016	13	1
Turkey	2017	6	0
Turkey	2018	8	1
Total		81	2

Scores and results list Turkey's goal tally first, score column indicates score after each Topal goal.

List of international goals scored by Mehmet Topal
No.	Date	Venue	Cap	Opponent	Score	Result	Competition
1	29 May 2016	Antalya Arena, Antalya, Turkey	58	Montenegro	1–0	1–0	Friendly
2	23 March 2018	Antalya Arena, Antalya, Turkey	74	Republic of Ireland	1–0	1–0	Friendly

== Managerial statistics ==
As of 18 May 2025

Managerial record by team and tenure
Team	From	To	Record							
Team	From	To	G	W	D	L	GF	GA	GD	Win %
(Romania) Petrolul Ploiești	6 June 2024	31 December 2024	25	8	12	5	27	24	+3	32.00
(Romania) Petrolul Ploiești	18 March 2025	24 May 2025	8	3	2	3	10	8	+2	37.50
(Romania) Petrolul Ploiești	28 March 2026	6 June 2026	7	2	3	2	9	12	−3	28.57
Total			40	13	17	10	46	44	+2	32.50

== Honours ==
Galatasaray

- Süper Lig: 2007–08
- Turkish Super Cup: 2008

Fenerbahçe

- Süper Lig: 2013–14
- Turkish Cup: 2012–13
- Turkish Super Cup: 2014

İstanbul Başakşehir

- Süper Lig: 2019–20

Beşiktaş

- Turkish Super Cup: 2021

Turkey

- UEFA European Championship third place: 2008

Individual

- Süper Lig Team of the Season: 2014–15
