= İsmail Köybaşı =

Turkish footballer (born 1989)

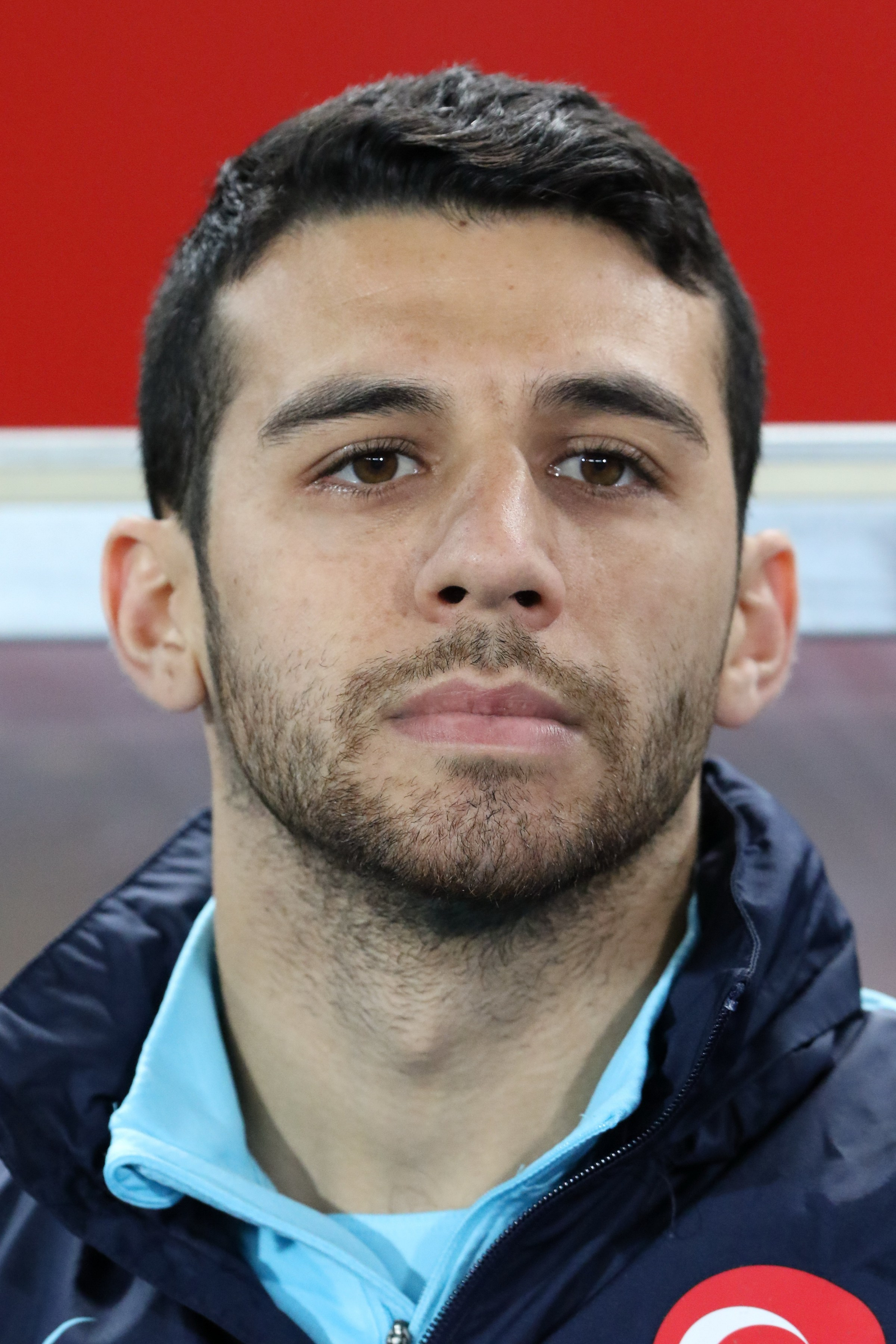
- Köybaşı with Turkey in 2016

Personal information
- Date of birth: 10 July 1989 (age 37)
- Place of birth: İskenderun, Hatay, Turkey
- Height: 1.79 m (5 ft 10 1/2 in)
- Position: Left-back

Youth career
- 2003–2006: İskenderunspor
- 2006: İskenderun Kartalspor
- 2006–2008: Gaziantepspor

Senior career*
Years	Team	Apps	(Gls)
2008–2009	Gaziantepspor	25	(0)
2009–2016	Beşiktaş	111	(2)
2016–2019	Fenerbahçe	37	(2)
2019–2020	Granada	4	(0)
2020–2021	Çaykur Rizespor	20	(3)
2021–2022	Trabzonspor	13	(0)
2022–2026	Göztepe	85	(7)

International career
2008	Turkey U19	1	(0)
2008	Turkey U20	2	(0)
2009–2010	Turkey U21	6	(0)
2009–2017	Turkey	28	(0)
- * Club domestic league appearances and goals

İsmail Köybaşı (born 10 July 1989) is a Turkish former professional footballer.

== Early life and club career ==
Born to a family from İskenderun, Köybaşı had begun to play football for İskenderunspor, a local club. Köybaşı started out as an attacking midfielder, but moved to left-back after recommendations from his colleagues. He briefly played for another local club, İskenderun Kartalspor, before joining Gaziantepspor in 2006.

=== Gaziantepspor ===
Köybaşı began his professional career in the youth divisions of Gaziantepspor. On 6 May 2008, he signed his first professional contract. He featured in 24 matches with 21 starts during the 2008–09 season. At the end of the season, he was linked with the big four clubs of Turkey, choosing Beşiktaş in the end.

=== Beşiktaş ===
Köybaşı joined Beşiktaş in June 2009 for a fee of €6.5 million, as well as an exchange of two Beşiktaş players. He began playing with the team during pre-season friendlies, and made his competitive debut in a Super Cup match against Fenerbahçe on 2 August 2009. In November 2009, he provided the assist to Rodrigo Tello's goal in a 1–0 victory at Old Trafford against Manchester United in the Champions League. It was the first time since February 2005, spanning 23 games, that United had lost a group stage Champions League fixture at home. He scored his first league goal against Ankaragücü in December 2009.

In September 2011, he provided two assists against Bursaspor, one from a free kick when Tomáš Sivok scored with his head in the 87th minute and the second with a cross to Filip Hološko, who also scored with his head in the 90th minute, securing a 2–1 away victory.

=== Fenerbahçe ===
On 14 July 2016, he signed a three-year contract with the club.

=== Granada ===
On 29 August 2019, free agent Köybaşı signed a one-year deal with newly-promoted La Liga side Granada CF.

== International career ==
Köybaşı has featured for Turkey at U-21's level, where he gained five caps. Köybaşı was called up to the senior national team by Fatih Terim for a friendly match against Ukraine on 12 August 2009. He won his first cap, replacing Arda Turan in the 86th minute.

== Career statistics ==
As of 15 May 2016.

Club	Season	League		Cup		Europe		Total	
Club	Season	Apps	Goals	Apps	Goals	Apps	Goals	Apps	Goals
Gaziantepspor	2007–08	1	0	0	0	0	0	1	0
Gaziantepspor	2008–09	24	0	3	0	0	0	27	0
Gaziantepspor	Total	25	0	3	0	0	0	28	0
Beşiktaş	2009–10	15	1	4	0	3	0	22	1
Beşiktaş	2010–11	19	1	10	0	8	0	37	1
Beşiktaş	2011–12	31	0	1	0	10	0	42	0
Beşiktaş	2012–13								
Beşiktaş	2013–14	7	0	1	0	0	0	8	0
Beşiktaş	2014–15	12	0	6	0	7	0	25	0
Beşiktaş	2015–16	27	0	2	0	6	0	35	0
Beşiktaş	Total	111	2	24	0	34	0	169	2
Career total		136	2	27	0	34	0	197	2

== Honours ==
Beşiktaş

- Süper Lig: 2015–16
- Türkiye Kupası: 2010–11

Trabzonspor

- Süper Lig: 2021–22

Individual

- Süper Lig Team of the Season: 2015–16
