= Aatif Chahechouhe =

Footballer (born 1986)

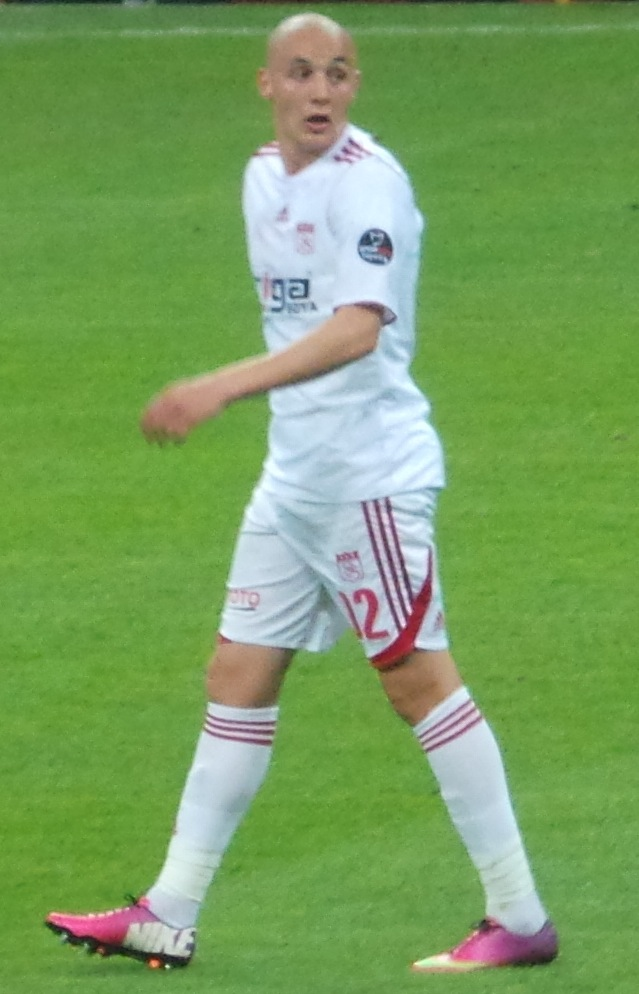
- Chahechouhe playing for Sivasspor in 2013

Personal information
- Full name: Aatif Chahechouhe
- Date of birth: 2 July 1986 (age 40)
- Place of birth: Fontenay-aux-Roses, France
- Height: 1.76 m (5 ft 9 in)
- Positions: Attacking midfielder; winger

Senior career*
Years	Team	Apps	(Gls)
2005–2006	Racing Paris	5	(0)
2007–2008	Sedan	5	(1)
2008–2009	Sannois Saint-Gratien	6	(0)
2009	Noisy-le-Sec	19	(4)
2009–2011	Nancy B	59	(16)
2009–2011	Nancy	7	(0)
2012	Chernomorets Burgas	15	(10)
2012–2016	Sivasspor	128	(48)
2016–2019	Fenerbahçe	47	(10)
2019	Çaykur Rizespor	12	(3)
2019–2020	Antalyaspor	17	(1)
2020	Fatih Karagümrük	10	(0)
2021	BB Erzurumspor	15	(4)
2021–2022	Ankaragücü	26	(2)

International career^{‡}
2014–2019	Morocco	10	(1)
- * Club domestic league appearances and goals as of 21 May 2022 ‡ National team caps and goals as of 7 June 2014

Aatif Chahechouhe (Arabic: عاطف شحشوح; born 2 July 1986) is a professional footballer who plays as an attacking midfielder or winger. Born in France, he played for the Morocco national team.

== Club career ==
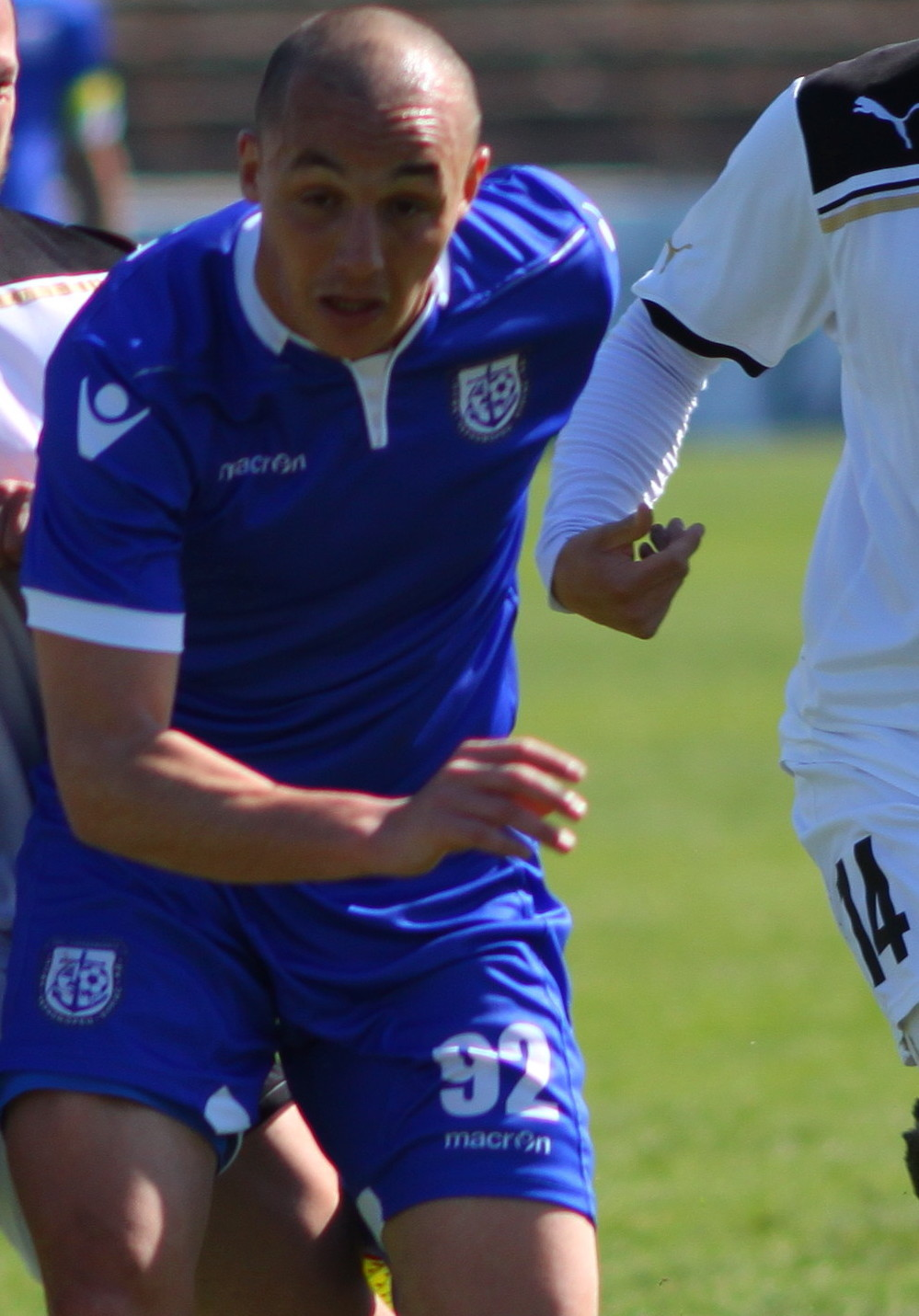
Chahechouhe playing for Chernomorets Burgas in March 2012

Born in Fontenay-aux-Roses, France to Moroccan parents, Chahechouhe holds French citizenship. Having played for a number of teams in the French lower leagues, Chahechouhe joined AS Nancy on 9 July 2009 after a short stint with Championnat de France amateur side Olympique Noisy-le-Sec. On 24 April 2010, he made his professional debut in a league match against Montpellier.

He joined Bulgarian side Chernomorets Burgas in January 2012 and scored 10 goals in 15 matches, attracting the attention of Turkish Süper Lig side Sivasspor, who paid a €500,000 transfer fee that summer.

Chahechouhe finished the 2013–14 season as the Süper Lig's top-scorer with 17 goals, helping Sivasspor to a fifth-place finish and qualification to the UEFA Europa League. Towards the end of the season, he received his first international call up for Morocco national team's friendly match with Gabon.

On 13 January 2021, Chahechouhe agreed with another Süper Lig club BB Erzurumspor. His contract was terminated on 22 April in same year.

== International career ==
Chahechouhe made his debut for Morocco on 23 May 2014 against Mozambique.

== Career statistics ==
Scores and results table. Morocco's goal tally first:

International goals
No.	Date	Venue	Opponent	Score	Result	Competition
1	23 May 2014	Estádio de São Luís, Faro, Portugal	Mozambique	3–0	4–0	Friendly
