= Hasan Ali Kaldırım =

Turkish footballer

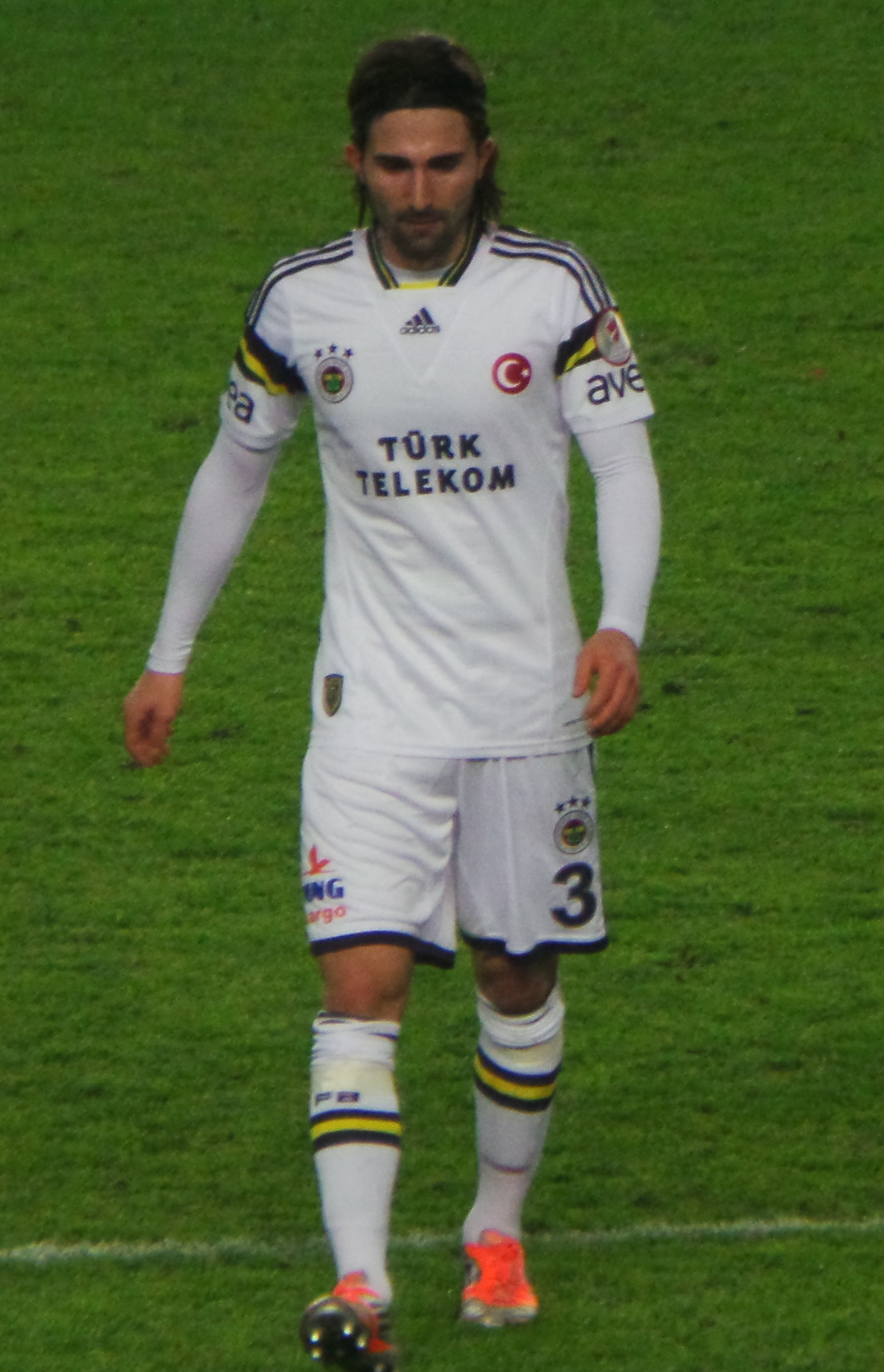

Personal information
- Date of birth: 9 December 1989 (age 36)
- Place of birth: Neuwied, West Germany
- Height: 1.83 m (6 ft 0 in)
- Position: Left wing back

Youth career
- 2005–2006: TuS Koblenz
- 2006–2008: 1. FC Kaiserslautern

Senior career*
Years	Team	Apps	(Gls)
2008–2009	1. FC Kaiserslautern II	43	(2)
2009–2010	Mainz 05 II	19	(1)
2010–2012	Kayserispor	72	(0)
2012–2020	Fenerbahçe	170	(5)
2020–2023	İstanbul Başakşehir	49	(0)
2023	Ankaragücü	8	(0)
2023–2025	Kayserispor	46	(2)
2025–2026	Amedspor	22	(1)

International career^{‡}
2008	Turkey U19	1	(1)
2008	Turkey U20	2	(0)
2009–2010	Turkey U21	7	(1)
2011	Turkey A2	4	(0)
2012–2020	Turkey	35	(1)
- * Club domestic league appearances and goals as of 5 May 2026 ‡ National team caps and goals as of 22 May 2023

Hasan Ali Kaldırım (Turkish pronunciation: [hasan ali kaɫdɯɾɯm], born 9 December 1989) is a professional footballer who plays as a left wingback. Born in Germany, he is also an international footballer, having earned caps for the Turkey U-19, U-20, and U-21 levels.

== Early years ==
Born to Turkish parents from Isparta, Kaldırım began playing football at the age of three. He came through the youth ranks of TuS Koblenz before moving to 1. FC Kaiserslautern in 2006. Starting out with the U19 squad, Kaldırım was promoted to the reserve squad at the start of the 2008–09 season. Kaldırım joined 1. FSV Mainz 05 the following season, citing Jörn Andersen's confidence in him as the catalyst for the move. With Mainz 05, Kaldırım made 19 appearances for the reserve team. Six months after his transfer, he was transferred again to Kayserispor.

== Club career ==
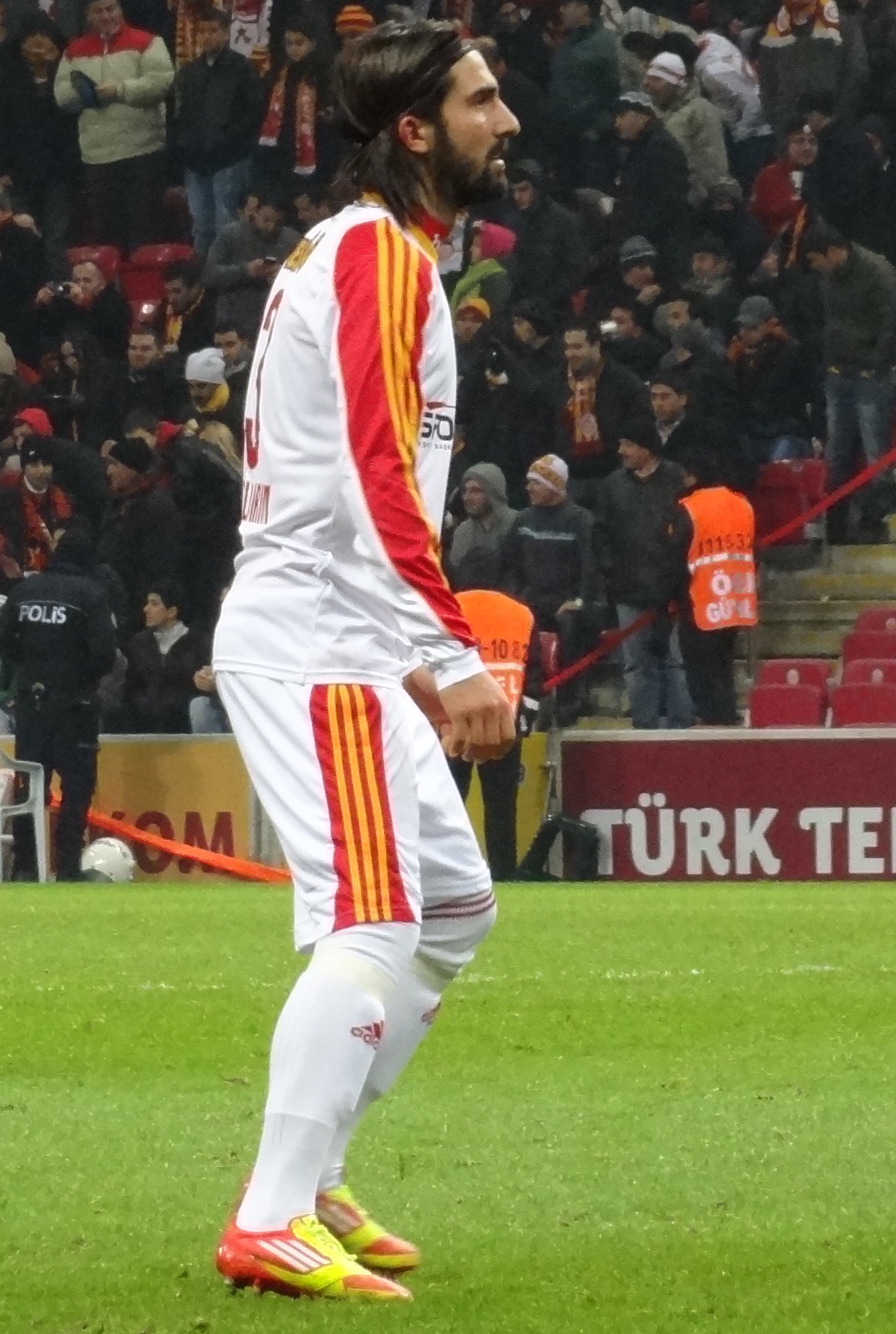
Hasan Ali playing for Kayserispor

Kaldırım made his professional debut for Kayserispor on 6 February 2010 against Galatasaray. In his first season, he played six matches. In his second season, he made progress and played in 15 games. In his third year with Kayserispor, Kaldırım became a regular starter and played in 33 matches. Because of his good performance at Kayserispor, he was called up for the Turkey national football team. He played four consecutive friendly games during his first call-up and showed good performances. His performance was good enough to impress Turkish club Fenerbahçe.

Kaldırım joined Fenerbahçe from Kayserispor on 22 June 2012 on a five-year contract for a fee of €6,750,000. He scored the first goal of his senior career in a league game in the Süper Lig against Galatasaray on 16 December 2012. In the first half of his first season for Fenerbahçe he was the team's main left back however, in the 2013–14 season, Michal Kadlec became the regular left back.

== International career ==
Kaldırım began his international career with the Turkey U-19 squad, scoring a goal in his only cap. He has also been capped at U-20, U-21, and A2 levels.

== Personal life ==
Kaldırım has two younger siblings: one brother and one sister, both footballers. He enjoys watching tennis and Formula 1 racing.

== Career statistics ==
=== Club ===
Appearances and goals by club, season and competition
Club	Season	League			Cup		Other		Europe		Total	
Club	Season	Division	Apps	Goals	Apps	Goals	Apps	Goals	Apps	Goals	Apps	Goals
1. FC Kaiserslautern II	2007–08	2. Bundesliga	10	1	0	0	0	0	0	0	10	1
1. FC Kaiserslautern II	2008–09	2. Bundesliga	33	1	0	0	0	0	0	0	33	1
Mainz 05 II	2009–10	2. Bundesliga	19	1	0	0	0	0	0	0	19	1
Kayserispor	2009–10	Super Lig	6	0	0	0	0	0	0	0	6	0
Kayserispor	2010–11	Super Lig	33	0	1	0	0	0	0	0	34	0
Kayserispor	2011–12	Super Lig	33	0	3	0	0	0	0	0	36	0
Fenerbahçe	2012–13	Süper Lig	25	1	7	0	1	0	9	0	42	1
Fenerbahçe	2013–14	Süper Lig	4	0	1	0	1	0	0	0	6	0
Fenerbahçe	2014–15	Süper Lig	13	0	7	1	0	0	0	0	20	1
Fenerbahçe	2015–16	Süper Lig	26	1	6	0	0	0	6	0	38	1
Fenerbahçe	2016–17	Süper Lig	29	0	3	0	0	0	11	0	43	0
Fenerbahçe	2017–18	Süper Lig	24	1	9	1	0	0	3	0	36	2
Fenerbahçe	2018–19	Süper Lig	31	2	2	0	0	0	8	1	41	3
Fenerbahçe	2019–20	Süper Lig	18	0	1	0	0	0	0	0	19	0
Başakşehir	2020-21	Süper Lig										
Career total			304	8	40	2	2	0	37	1	383	11

=== International goals ===
Scores and results list Turkey's goal tally first.

No.	Date	Venue	Opponent	Score	Result	Competition
1.	25 March 2019	Eskişehir Stadium, Eskişehir, Turkey	Moldova	1–0	4–0	UEFA Euro 2020 qualification

== Honours ==
Fenerbahçe

- Süper Lig: 2013–14
- Turkish Cup: 2012–13
- Turkish Super Cup: 2014
