= Samed Karakoç =

Turkish footballer (born 1997)

Personal information
- Full name: Muhammed Samed Karakoç
- Date of birth: 30 June 1997 (age 29)
- Place of birth: Tokat, Turkey
- Height: 1.70 m (5 ft 7 in)
- Position: Right winger

Team information
- Current team: İnegölspor
- Number: 5

Youth career
- 2007–2009: Tokatspor
- 2009–2017: Fenerbahçe

Senior career*
Years	Team	Apps	(Gls)
2017–2019	Fenerbahçe	1	(0)
2018–2019	→ Tarsus İdman Yurdu (loan)	33	(9)
2019–2021	Hatayspor	1	(0)
2020	→ Ankara Demirspor (loan)	10	(0)
2020–2021	→ 24 Erzincanspor (loan)	36	(5)
2021–2022	Şanlıurfaspor	29	(3)
2022–2023	24 Erzincanspor	34	(5)
2023–	İnegölspor	5	(0)

International career
2012	Turkey U15	3	(0)
2012–2013	Turkey U16	17	(1)
2013–2014	Turkey U17	11	(1)
2014–2015	Turkey U18	7	(0)
2015–2016	Turkey U19	8	(1)
- * Club domestic league appearances and goals as of 1 October 2023

Muhammed Samed Karakoç (born 30 June 1997) is a Turkish professional footballer who plays as a midfielder, generally as a right winger, for İnegölspor.

== Professional career ==
Samed made his professional debut for Fenerbahçe in a Süper Lig 2–2 tie with Göztepe on 12 August 2017.

For the 2018–19 season Samed was loaned out to third tier Turkish club Tarsus İdman Yurdu. He has played 33 games and scored 9 goals.
