= Ali Palabıyık =

Turkish football referee (born 1981)

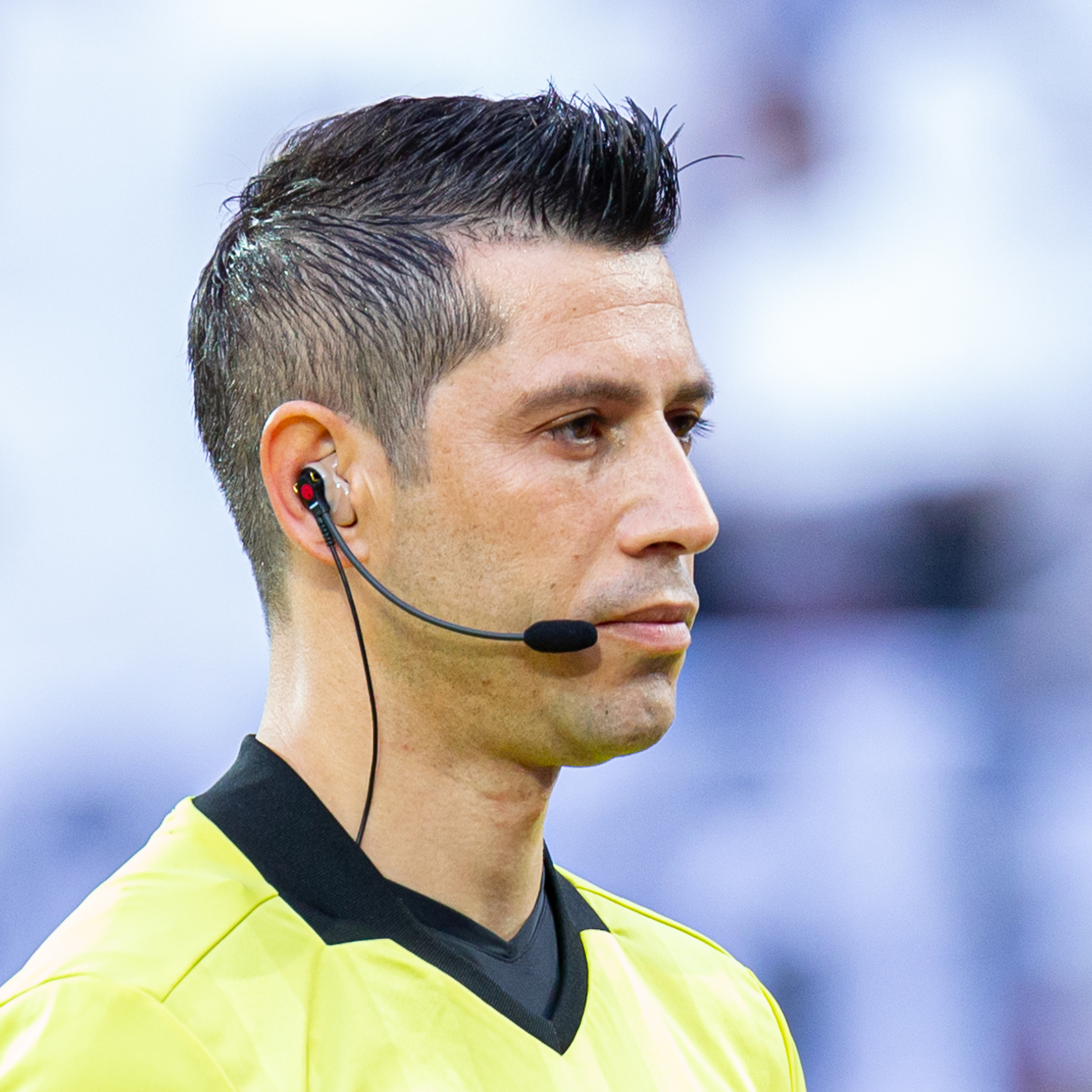
- Palabıyık in 2019
- Born: 4 August 1981 (age 45); Ankara, Turkey

Domestic
Years	League	Role
2012–	TFF First League	Referee
2012–	Süper Lig	

International
Years	League	Role
2015–	FIFA listed	Referee

Ali Palabıyık (born 4 August 1981) is a Turkish football referee who officiates in the Süper Lig. He has been a FIFA referee since 2015, and is ranked as a UEFA first category referee.

== Refereeing career ==
In 2012, Palabıyık began officiating in the Süper Lig. His first match as referee was on 27 October 2012 between Mersin İdman Yurdu and İstanbul Başakşehir. In 2015, he was put on the FIFA referees list. He officiated his first senior international match on 26 March 2016 between Azerbaijan and Kazakhstan. In 2017, Palabıyık was appointed as an official for the 2017 UEFA European Under-19 Championship in Georgia, his first international tournament as a referee. On 23 October 2019, he officiated his first match in the tournament proper of the UEFA Champions League between RB Leipzig and Zenit Saint Petersburg.
