= Yiğithan Güveli =

Turkish footballer

Personal information
- Date of birth: 16 May 1998 (age 28)
- Place of birth: Derince, Turkey
- Height: 1.94 m (6 ft 4 in)
- Position: Centre back

Team information
- Current team: Isparta 32 Spor
- Number: 3

Youth career
- 2006–2008: Derince Belediye Demirspor
- 2008–2017: Fenerbahçe

Senior career*
| Years | Team | Apps | (Gls) |
| 2017–2019 | Fenerbahçe | 2 | (0) |
| 2019–2020 | Yeni Malatyaspor | 2 | (0) |
| 2020–2021 | Altınordu | 3 | (0) |
| 2021–2022 | Ümraniyespor | 2 | (0) |
| 2022–2023 | Adanaspor | 18 | (0) |
| 2023– | Isparta 32 Spor | 63 | (3) |

International career
| 2013 | Turkey U15 | 6 | (0) |
| 2014 | Turkey U16 | 2 | (0) |
- * Club domestic league appearances and goals as of 1 October 2026

Yiğithan Güveli (born 16 May 1998) is a Turkish professional footballer who plays as a centre back for TFF Second League club Isparta 32 Spor.

== Professional career ==
Güveli joined Fenerbahçe at the age of 8, and developed solely in their youth academy. Güveli made his professional debut for Fenerbahçe in a 3-1 Süper Lig away victory against Adanaspor on 3 June 2017.
