= Şener Özbayraklı =

Turkish footballer

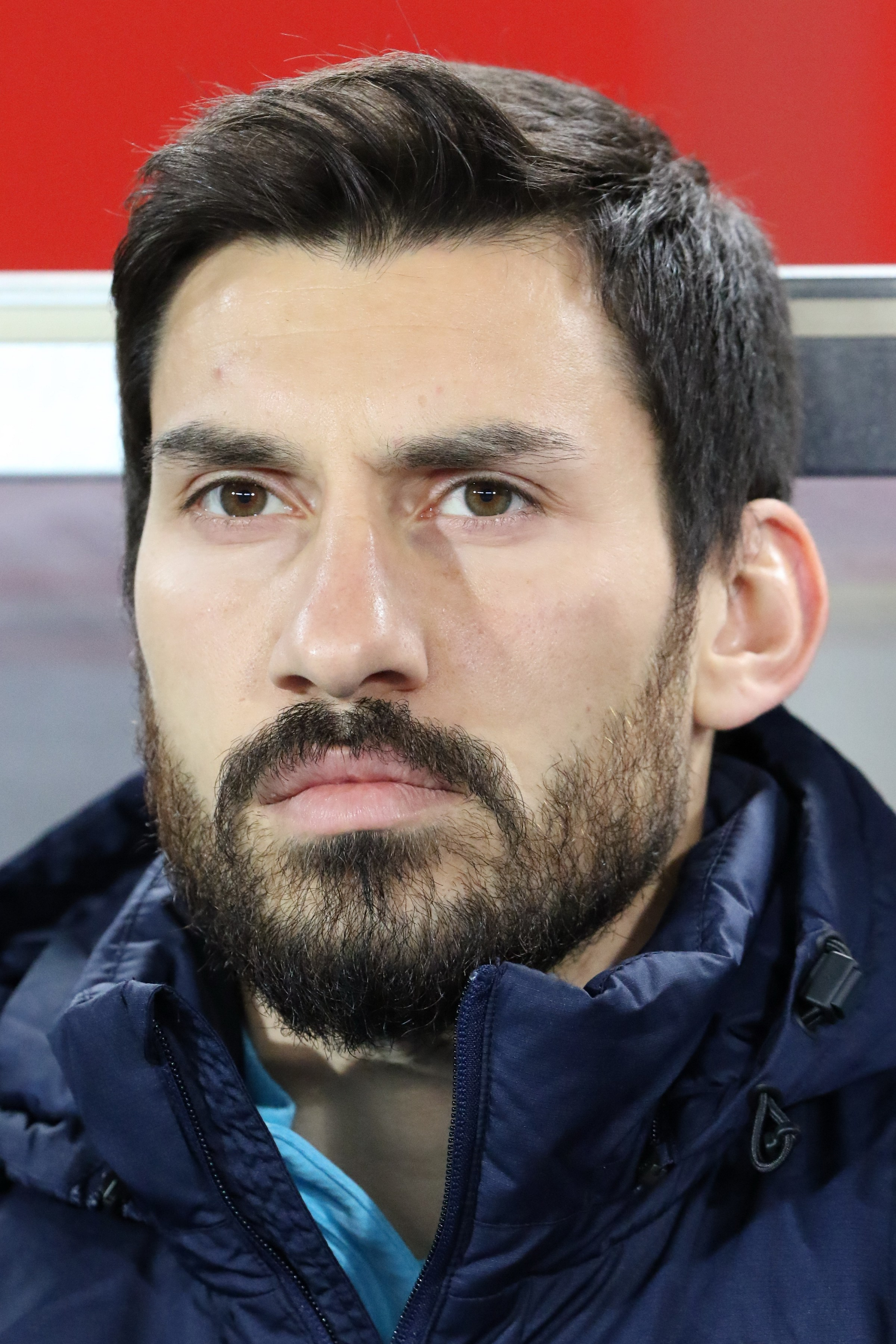
- Özbayraklı with Turkey in 2016

Personal information
- Date of birth: 23 January 1990 (age 36)
- Place of birth: Borçka, Turkey
- Height: 1.71 m (5 ft 7 in)
- Position: Right back

Senior career*
Years	Team	Apps	(Gls)
2009–2010	Keçiörengücü	42	(0)
2010–2013	Polatlı Bugsaşspor	66	(3)
2013–2015	Bursaspor	79	(2)
2015–2019	Fenerbahçe	61	(3)
2019–2021	Galatasaray	20	(0)
2021–2023	İstanbul Başakşehir	21	(0)

International career^{‡}
2008	Turkey U18	1	(0)
2013	Turkey B	2	(0)
2015–2018	Turkey	19	(0)
- * Club domestic league appearances and goals as of 17 September 2023 ‡ National team caps and goals as of 15 January 2021

Şener Özbayraklı (born 23 January 1990) is a Turkish former footballer who played as a right back.

== Club career ==
He made his Süper Lig debut on 19 January 2013. After two successful seasons at Bursaspor it was announced that Bursaspor had accepted a €1,700,000 offer from Fenerbahçe on the 23 June 2015.

=== Galatasaray ===
He was transferred to Galatasaray before the 2019–20 season. In the statement sent by Galatasaray Sportif AŞ to the Public Disclosure Platform, it was stated that 2 seasons have been agreed with professional football player Özbayraklı, starting from the 2019–20 football season.

=== Başakşehir ===
On 9 June 2021, he has signed a two-year contract with İstanbul Başakşehir. He renewed his contract for the 2023–24 season in August 2023, before it was mutually terminated in mid-September.

== International career ==
He was part of the Turkey national team for UEFA Euro 2016.

== Career statistics ==
As of 25 September 2023

=== Club ===
Club	Season	League	League		Cup		Europe		Other		Total	
Club	Season	League	Apps	Goals	Apps	Goals	Apps	Goals	Apps	Goals	Apps	Goals
Keçiörengücü	2008–09	TFF Third League	11	0	0	0	—		—		11	0
Keçiörengücü	2009–10	TFF Third League	31	0	0	0	—		—		31	0
Keçiörengücü	Total		42	0	0	0	0	0	0	0	42	0
Polatlı Bugsaşspor	2010–11	TFF Second League	26	1	0	0	—		—		26	1
Polatlı Bugsaşspor	2011–12	TFF Second League	31	0	3	0	—		—		34	0
Polatlı Bugsaşspor	2012–13	TFF Second League	9	2	1	0	—		—		10	2
Polatlı Bugsaşspor	Total		66	3	4	0	0	0	0	0	70	3
Bursaspor	2012–13	Süper Lig	16	1	3	0	—		—		19	1
Bursaspor	2013–14	Süper Lig	32	1	8	0	2	0	—		42	1
Bursaspor	2014–15	Süper Lig	31	0	9	0	2	0	—		42	0
Bursaspor	Total		79	2	20	0	4	0	0	0	103	2
Fenerbahçe	2015–16	Süper Lig	14	1	10	1	8	0	—		32	2
Fenerbahçe	2016–17	Süper Lig	19	0	6	0	8	0	—		33	0
Fenerbahçe	2017–18	Süper Lig	19	2	6	1	3	0	—		28	3
Fenerbahçe	2018–19	Süper Lig	9	0	3	0	5	0	—		17	0
Fenerbahçe	Total		61	3	25	2	24	0	0	0	110	5
Galatasaray	2019–20	Süper Lig	8	0	3	0	2	0	—		13	0
Galatasaray	2020–21	Süper Lig	12	0	2	0	0	0	—		14	0
Galatasaray	Total		20	0	5	0	2	0	0	0	27	0
Istanbul Başakşehir	2021–22	Süper Lig	9	0	1	0	0	0	—		10	0
Istanbul Başakşehir	2022–23	Süper Lig	10	0	4	0	4	0	—		18	0
Istanbul Başakşehir	2023–24	Süper Lig	2	0	0	0	0	0	—		2	0
Istanbul Başakşehir	Total		21	0	5	0	4	0	0	0	30	0
Career total			289	8	59	2	34	0	0	0	382	10

=== International ===
Turkey national team
Year	Apps	Goals
2015	6	0
2016	6	0
2017	2	0
2018	5	0
Total	19	0

== Personal life ==
In February 2020, the actress got engaged to Şilan Makal. The couple got married in May 2020.

== Honours ==
=== Individual ===
- Süper Lig Team of the Season: 2014–15
