= 2014–15 Fenerbahçe S.K. season =

Fenerbahçe
2014–15 season
- President: Aziz Yıldırım
- Head coach: İsmail Kartal
- Stadium: Şükrü Saracoğlu Stadium
- Süper Lig: 2nd
- Turkish Cup: Semi-finals
- Turkish Super Cup: Winners
- Top goalscorer: League: Moussa Sow (14); All: Moussa Sow (16)
- Highest home attendance: 52,500 (vs Galatasaray, 8 March 2015)
- Lowest home attendance: 1,000 (vs Kasımpaşa, 30 May 2015)
- Average home league attendance: 20,029
Home colours	Away colours	Third colours

The 2014–15 season is Fenerbahçe's 57th consecutive season in the Süper Lig and their 108th year in existence.

== Season overview ==
- On 3 July 2014, Miroslav Stoch was loaned out to Al Ain for €1 million on a one-year deal. The same day, Stoch also extended his contract with Fenerbahçe until the end of the 2017–18 season.
- On 7 July 2014, Salih Uçan was sent on a two-year loan to Roma for €4.75 million. Initially a two-year loan, the Giallorossi hold an €11 buy-out option for the player.
- On 12 July 2014, Former Atlético Madrid midfielder Diego has completed his move to Fenerbahçe on a free transfer following the expiry of his VfL Wolfsburg contract. Following a lengthy spell of negotiations, the Brazilian signed a three-year deal at a reported salary of €3.5 million per year.
- On 14 July 2014, Caner Erkin has extended his contract until 2016.
- On 15 July 2014, Fenerbahçe completed their first pre-season training. The players who were involved in the 2014 FIFA World Cup were still on vacation.
- On 19 July 2014, Fenerbahçe unveiled its new Adidas 2014–15 home, away and third kits, which will feature no sponsor logo for the first time in 36 years. Adidas and Fenerbahçe extended their kit deal in February 2014 at least until 2018–19, with the deal worth a reported $8.5 million per season. The 2014–15 home kit features the traditional design of the club.
- On 19 July 2014, Fenerbahçe, will play their first preparation match with long-established English club Sheffield United at United's home ground Bramall Lane Stadium, known as world's oldest stadium. The income from the match will be donated to people affected by the Soma mine disaster.
- On 19 July 2014, Fenerbahçe will be hosting a mini-tournament organised by IMG-Doğuş AS, will run in a mini-league format, with one point awarded for a draw and three for a win. The team with the highest number of points after all matches have been played will be crowned winners of the competition. Fenerbahçe will play two 45-minute matches against Chelsea and their Istanbul neighbours Beşiktaş at the Şükrü Saracoğlu Stadium. All proceeds from the mini-tournament will go towards helping the victims and families of those who suffered when an explosion at a mine in Soma on 13 May killed 301 people, the worst disaster of its kind Turkey has suffered.
- On 31 July 2014, Fenerbahçe lost 2–1 in a charity friendly match with Sheffield United in aid of the Soma mine disaster.
- On 10 April 2015, Dirk Kuyt has agreed to sign with Feyenoord after his contract will expire on 31 May 2015.

== Squad ==
=== First team squad ===
No.	Name	Position (s)	Nationality	Place of birth	Date of birth (age)	Club caps	Club goals	Signed from	Date signed	Fee	Contract End
Goalkeepers
1	Volkan Demirel	GK	(Turkey)	Istanbul	27 October 1981 (aged 33)	377	0	Kartalspor	6 August 2002	Free	30 June 2017
23	Mert Günok	GK	(Turkey)	Karabük	1 March 1989 (aged 26)	50	0	Academy	1 July 2007	Trainee	30 June 2015
54	Erten Ersu	GK	(Turkey)	Istanbul	21 April 1994 (aged 21)	1	0	Academy	1 July 2013	Trainee	30 June 2019
Defenders
2	Egemen Korkmaz	DF	(Turkey)	Balıkesir	3 November 1982 (aged 32)	83	6	Beşiktaş	4 July 2012	Free	30 June 2015
3	Hasan Ali Kaldırım	DF	(Turkey)	Neuwied, West Germany	9 December 1989 (aged 25)	68	2	Kayserispor	1 July 2012	€3,750,000	30 June 2017
4	Bekir İrtegün	DF	(Turkey)	Elazığ	20 April 1984 (aged 31)	155	9	Gaziantepspor	1 July 2009	Free	30 June 2015
22	Bruno Alves	DF	(Portugal)	Póvoa de Varzim, Portugal	16 November 1981 (aged 33)	60	3	(Russia) Zenit	1 July 2013	€5,500,000	30 June 2016
24	Michal Kadlec	DF	(Czech Republic)	Vyškov, Czechoslovakia	13 December 1984 (aged 30)	37	4	(Germany) Bayer Leverkusen	1 July 2013	€4,500,000	30 June 2016
53	Serdar Kesimal	DF	(Turkey)	Wuppertal, West Germany	24 January 1989 (aged 26)	38	0	Kayserispor	25 August 2011	€4,750,000	30 June 2016
77	Gökhan Gönül	DF	(Turkey)	Samsun	5 January 1985 (aged 30)	309	11	Hacettepe	1 July 2007	€1,400,000	30 June 2016
88	Caner Erkin	DF	(Turkey)	Balıkesir	4 October 1988 (aged 26)	186	15	(Russia) CSKA Moscow	30 June 2010	€2,000,000	30 June 2016
94	Hakan Çinemre	DF	(Turkey)	Gölcük	14 February 1994 (aged 21)	1	0	Academy	1 July 2013	Trainee	30 June 2016
Midfielders
5	Mehmet Topal	MF	(Turkey)	Malatya	3 March 1986 (aged 29)	123	11	(Spain) Valencia	1 July 2012	€4,500,000	30 June 2016
10	Diego	MF	(Brazil)	Ribeirão Preto, Brazil	28 February 1985 (aged 30)	30	5	(Spain) Atlético Madrid	11 July 2014	Free	30 June 2017
14	Raul Meireles	MF	(Portugal)	Porto, Portugal	17 March 1983 (aged 32)	84	7	(England) Chelsea	3 September 2012	€10,000,000	30 June 2016
19	Muhammed Akarslan	MF	(Turkey)	Adıyaman	2 April 1995 (aged 20)	4	0	Academy	29 April 2014	Trainee	30 June 2016
20	Emre Belözoğlu	MF	(Turkey)	Istanbul	7 September 1980 (aged 34)	200	29	(Spain) Atlético Madrid	31 January 2013	€350,000	30 June 2015
21	Selçuk Şahin	MF	(Turkey)	Tunceli	31 January 1981 (aged 34)	326	18	İstanbulspor	1 June 2003	€1,500,000	30 June 2015
26	Alper Potuk	MF	(Turkey)	Afyonkarahisar	8 April 1991 (aged 24)	70	4	Eskişehirspor	22 May 2013	€6,250,000	30 June 2018
38	Mehmet Topuz	MF	(Turkey)	Yozgat	7 September 1983 (aged 31)	205	12	Kayserispor	13 June 2009	€9,000,000	30 June 2016
Forwards
7	Moussa Sow	FW	(Senegal)	Mantes-la-Jolie, France	19 January 1986 (aged 29)	143	59	(France) Lille	27 January 2012	€10,000,000	30 June 2016
9	Pierre Webó	FW	(Cameroon)	Bafoussam, Cameroon	20 January 1982 (aged 33)	89	33	İstanbul Başakşehir	1 February 2013	€3,000,000	30 June 2015
11	Dirk Kuyt	FW	(Netherlands)	Katwijk aan Zee, Netherlands	22 June 1980 (aged 34)	130	37	(England) Liverpool	3 June 2012	€1,000,000	30 June 2015
29	Emmanuel Emenike	FW	(Nigeria)	Aguleri, Nigeria	10 May 1987 (aged 28)	66	17	(Russia) Spartak Moscow	10 August 2013	€13,000,000	30 June 2017

As of 30 May 2015

Note:Players loan out during the season demonstrated by different colour

== Kit ==
- Supplier: Adidas
- Main sponsor: –
- Back sponsor: Ülker
- Sleeve sponsor: –
- Short sponsor: –
- Socks sponsor: –

Home	Home alt.	Home alt.2	Home alt.3	Away	Away alt.	Third

=== Kit information ===
On 19 July 2014, Fenerbahçe unveiled its new Adidas 2014–15 home, away and third kits, which will feature no sponsor logo for the first time in 36 years. Adidas and Fenerbahçe extended their kit deal in February 2014 at least until 2018–19, while it is reported that the Adidas–Fenerbahçe deal is worth $8.5 million per season. The new Fenerbahçe 2014–15 Home Kit features the traditional design of the Turkish club.

== Transfers ==
2014–2015 Football Transfers
Players transferred in
Date	Pos.	Name	Club	Fee	Ref.
12 July 2014	MF	(Brazil) Diego	(Spain) Atlético Madrid	Free	
29 August 2014	MF	(Turkey) Erdi Şehit	(Turkey) Sakaryaspor	Free	
Players transferred out
Date	Pos.	Name	Club	Fee	Ref.
22 July 2014	MF	(Turkey) Oğuz Mataracı	(Austria) LASK Linz	???	
28 August 2014	MF	(Turkey) Metincan Cici	(Turkey) Antalyaspor	Free	
Players loan out
Date	Pos.	Name	Club	Fee	Ref.
1 July 2014	MF	(Turkey) Gökhan Sazdağı	(Turkey) Manisaspor	Free	
2 July 2014	MF	(Turkey) İbrahim Serdar Aydın	(Turkey) Kardemir Karabükspor	Free	
3 July 2014	MF	(Slovakia) Miroslav Stoch	(United Arab Emirates) Al Ain	€1,000,000	
7 July 2014	MF	(Turkey) Salih Uçan	(Italy) Roma	€4,750,000	
24 July 2014	MF	(Turkey) Gökay Iravul	(Turkey) Gaziantep	Free	
31 July 2014	MF	(Turkey) Recep Niyaz	(Turkey) Samsunspor	Free	
1 August 2014	MF	(Turkey) Beykan Şimşek	(Turkey) Adana Demirspor	Free	
8 August 2014	MF	(Sweden) Samuel Holmén	(Turkey) Bursaspor	Free	
18 August 2014	DF	(Turkey) Berkay Can Değirmencioğlu	(Turkey) Kayserispor	Free	
28 August 2014	FW	(Turkey) Semih Ergül	(Turkey) Alanyaspor	Free	
29 August 2014	GK	(Turkey) Ertuğrul Taşkıran	(Turkey) Sivasspor	Free	
29 August 2014	MF	(Turkey) Erdi Şehit	(Turkey) TKİ Tavşanlı Linyitspor	Free	
26 January 2015	DF	(Turkey) Hakan Çinemre	(Turkey) Adana Demirspor	Free	
28 January 2015	MF	(Turkey) Gökay Iravul	(Turkey) Alanyaspor	Free	
30 January 2015	FW	(Turkey) Semih Ergül	(Turkey) Kartalspor	Free	
2 February 2015	MF	(Turkey) Muhammed Akarslan	(Turkey) Sarıyer	Free	
2 February 2015	FW	(Turkey) Aziz Ceylan	(Turkey) Altay	Free	
Players released
Date	Pos.	Name	Subsequent club	Join date	Ref.
1 June 2014	FW	(Turkey) Furkan Aydın	(Turkey) Payas Belediyespor 1975	1 July 2014	
1 June 2014	MF	(Turkey) Onur Karakabak	(Turkey) Bandırmaspor	19 July 2014	
1 June 2014	DF	(Turkey) Hasan Erbey	(Turkey) Aydınspor 1923	1 August 2014	
1 June 2014	FW	(Turkey) Recep Berk Elitez	(Turkey) Tuzlaspor	5 August 2014	
1 June 2014	MF	(Turkey) Berkay Öztuvan	(Turkey) Gölbaşıspor	29 August 2014	
28 August 2014	MF	(Brazil) Cristian Baroni	(Brazil) Corinthians	3 January 2015	
29 August 2014	DF	(Nigeria) Joseph Yobo	Currently unattached		

Total spending: ▼€0.0 million
Total income: ▲€5,750,000

== Line-up ==
As of 30 May 2015

No.	Pos.	Name	GS	Note
1	GK	Volkan Demirel	29	(Note: Mert Günok has 17 starts)
77	RB	Gökhan Gönül	35	(Note: Savaş Polat has 3 start, Mehmet Topuz has 4 start, Serdar Kesimal has 3 start, Bekir İrtegün has 1 start)
24	CD	Bruno Alves	29	(Note: Michal Kadlec has 14 start, Bekir İrtegün has 2 start, Serdar Kesimal has 1 start)
4	CD	Egemen Korkmaz	20	(Note: Bekir İrtegün has 23 start, Serdar Kesimal has 2 start, Mehmet Topal has 1 start)
88	LB	Caner Erkin	29	(Note: Hasan Ali Kaldırım has 11 start, Michal Kadlec has 6 start)
5	DM	Mehmet Topal	39	(Note: Alper Potuk has 2 start, Selçuk Şahin has 1 start, Uygar Mert Zeybek has 3 start, Caner Koca has 1 start)
20	CM	Emre Belözoğlu	25	(Note: Selçuk Şahin has 12 start, Diego has 4 start, Alper Potuk has 3 start, Ramazan Civelek has 2 start)
14	CM	Raul Meireles	20	(Note: Diego has 19 starts, Alper Potuk has 3 start, Mehmet Topuz has 1 start, Uygar Mert Zeybek has 3 start)
11	RW	Dirk Kuyt	34	(Note: Mehmet Topuz has 6 start, Muhammed Akarslan has 1 start, Melih Okutan has 1 start, Emmanuel Emenike has 3 start, Caner Erkin has 1 start)
7	LW	Moussa Sow	25	(Note: Alper Potuk has 15 start, Caner Koca has 1 start, Uygar Mert Zeybek has 2 start, Caner Erkin has 3 start)
29	CF	Emmanuel Emenike	25	(Note: Pierre Webó has 14 start, Moussa Sow has 7 start)

== Squad statistics ==
No.	Nat.	Player	Süper Lig				Turkish Cup				Turkish Super Cup				Total			
No.	Nat.	Player	Apps	Goal	Yellow card	Red card	Apps	Goal	Yellow card	Red card	Apps	Goal	Yellow card	Red card	Apps	Goal	Yellow card	Red card
1	(Turkey)	Volkan Demirel	26	0	2	0	2	0	1	0	1	0	1	0	29	0	4	0
2	(Turkey)	Egemen Korkmaz	17	2	4	0	3	0	0	0	0	0	0	0	20	2	4	0
3	(Turkey)	Hasan Ali Kaldırım	13	0	3	0	7	1	3	0	0	0	0	0	20	1	6	0
4	(Turkey)	Bekir İrtegün	20	1	5	1	9	2	2	0	1	0	0	0	30	3	7	1
5	(Turkey)	Mehmet Topal	33	2	7	0	7	2	0	0	1	0	0	0	41	4	7	0
6	(Nigeria)	Joseph Yobo	0	0	0	0	0	0	0	0	0	0	0	0	0	0	0	0
7	(Senegal)	Moussa Sow	33	14	0	0	6	2	1	0	1	0	0	0	40	16	1	0
8	(Sweden)	Samuel Holmén	0	0	0	0	0	0	0	0	0	0	0	0	0	0	0	0
9	(Cameroon)	Pierre Webó	26	8	3	1	9	5	0	0	0	0	0	0	35	13	3	1
10	(Brazil)	Diego	25	3	3	0	5	2	3	0	0	0	0	0	30	5	6	0
11	(Netherlands)	Dirk Kuyt	32	8	3	0	4	2	0	0	1	0	1	0	37	10	4	0
14	(Portugal)	Raul Meireles	23	2	4	0	3	0	0	0	1	0	0	0	27	2	4	0
16	(Brazil)	Cristian	0	0	0	0	0	0	0	0	0	0	0	0	0	0	0	0
19	(Turkey)	Muhammed Akarslan	0	0	0	0	3	0	0	0	0	0	0	0	3	0	0	0
20	(Turkey)	Emre Belözoğlu	26	6	7	1	1	0	0	0	1	0	1	0	28	6	8	1
21	(Turkey)	Selçuk Şahin	23	1	4	0	9	0	2	0	0	0	0	0	32	1	6	0
22	(Portugal)	Bruno Alves	24	0	6	2	5	1	0	0	1	0	1	0	30	1	7	2
23	(Turkey)	Mert Günok	9	0	0	0	9	0	0	0	0	0	0	0	18	0	0	0
24	(Czech Republic)	Michal Kadlec	12	1	3	0	10	1	2	1	1	0	0	0	23	2	5	1
26	(Turkey)	Alper Potuk	30	3	4	0	5	0	0	0	1	0	0	0	36	3	4	0
27	(Serbia)	Miloš Krasić	0	0	0	0	0	0	0	0	0	0	0	0	0	0	0	0
29	(Nigeria)	Emmanuel Emenike	27	4	7	0	7	1	1	0	1	0	1	0	35	5	9	0
38	(Turkey)	Mehmet Topuz	8	1	0	1	9	2	1	0	1	0	0	0	18	3	1	1
53	(Turkey)	Serdar Kesimal	1	0	0	0	6	0	2	0	0	0	0	0	7	0	2	0
54	(Turkey)	Erten Ersu	0	0	0	0	1	0	0	0	0	0	0	0	1	0	0	0
77	(Turkey)	Gökhan Gönül	32	0	4	0	2	0	1	0	1	0	0	0	35	0	5	0
88	(Turkey)	Caner Erkin	31	3	11	2	4	1	3	0	1	0	0	0	36	4	14	2
94	(Turkey)	Hakan	0	0	0	0	1	0	0	0	0	0	0	0	1	0	0	0
As of 30 May 2015

Note:Players loan out during the season demonstrated by different colour

== Statistics ==
As of 30 May 2015

=== Goals ===
Pl.	Nat.	Player	Süper Lig	Türkiye Kupası	TOTAL
1	(Senegal)	Moussa Sow	14	2	16
2	(Cameroon)	Pierre Webó	8	5	13
3	(Netherlands)	Dirk Kuyt	8	2	10
4	(Turkey)	Emre Belözoğlu	6	0	6
5	(Brazil)	Diego	3	2	5
5	(Nigeria)	Emmanuel Emenike	4	1	5
7	(Turkey)	Caner Erkin	3	1	4
7	(Turkey)	Mehmet Topal	2	2	4
9	(Turkey)	Alper Potuk	3	0	3
9	(Turkey)	Bekir İrtegün	1	2	3
9	(Turkey)	Mehmet Topuz	1	2	3
12	(Turkey)	Egemen Korkmaz	2	0	2
12	(Czech Republic)	Michal Kadlec	1	1	2
12	(Portugal)	Raul Meireles	2	0	2
15	(Portugal)	Bruno Alves	0	1	1
15	(Turkey)	Caner Koca	0	1	1
15	(Turkey)	Hasan Ali Kaldırım	0	1	1
15	(Turkey)	Ramazan Civelek	0	1	1
15	(Turkey)	Selçuk Şahin	1	0	1

=== Assists ===
Pl.	Nat.	Player	Süper Lig	Türkiye Kupası	TOTAL
1	(Turkey)	Caner Erkin	8	0	8
2	(Brazil)	Diego	6	1	7
2	(Nigeria)	Emmanuel Emenike	3	4	7
2	(Senegal)	Moussa Sow	4	3	7
5	(Netherlands)	Dirk Kuyt	5	0	5
6	(Portugal)	Raul Meireles	3	1	4
6	(Turkey)	Mehmet Topal	3	1	4
6	(Cameroon)	Pierre Webó	3	1	4
9	(Turkey)	Alper Potuk	2	1	3
9	(Turkey)	Emre Belözoğlu	2	1	3
9	(Turkey)	Gökhan Gönül	3	0	3
12	(Turkey)	Uygar Mert Zeybek	0	2	2
13	(Portugal)	Bruno Alves	0	1	1
13	(Turkey)	Bekir İrtegün	0	1	1
13	(Turkey)	Egemen Korkmaz	1	0	1
13	(Turkey)	Hasan Ali Kaldırım	1	0	1
13	(Czech Republic)	Michal Kadlec	0	1	1
13	(Turkey)	Mehmet Topuz	0	1	1

== Overall ==
Trophy	Started round	First match	Last match	Result
Süper Lig	Matchday 1	31 August 2014	30 May 2015	Runners–up
Turkish Cup	Group Stage	2 December 2014	21 May 2015	Semi-finals
Turkish Super Cup	Final	25 August 2014		Champions

== Pre-season friendlies ==
Date	Opponents	Stadium	Result F–A	Attendance	Notes
26 July 2014	(Iran) Sepahan	18 Temmuz Stadyumu	1–0	4,500	
31 July 2014	(England) Sheffield United	Bramall Lane	1–2	12,950	
2 August 2014	(Spain) Sevilla	Brøndby Stadium	0–2		
8 August 2014	(England) Chelsea	Şükrü Saracoğlu Stadium	0–2	21,300	
8 August 2014	(Turkey) Beşiktaş	Şükrü Saracoğlu Stadium	0–1	21,300	
16 August 2014	(Greece) Olympiacos	Şükrü Saracoğlu Stadium	2–1		
19 August 2014	(Italy) Roma	Stadio Olimpico	3–3		
15 January 2015	(Turkey) Alanyaspor	Alanya Oba Stadium	2–2	3,000	

Win Draw Loss Postponed

== Turkish Super Cup ==
25 August 2014 Süper Kupa	Fenerbahçe	0–0 (3–2 p)	Galatasaray	Manisa
20:30 EEST (UTC+03)		Report		Stadium: Manisa 19 Mayıs Stadium; Referee: Mustafa Kamil Abitoğlu
	Penalties
	Kuyt (penalty scored); Erkin (penalty missed); Topuz (penalty missed); Meireles (penalty scored); Kadlec (penalty scored)		Adın (penalty scored); İnan (penalty missed); Melo (penalty missed); Kurtuluş (penalty missed); Yılmaz (penalty scored)

== Süper Lig ==
=== League table ===
Pos	Team	Pld	W	D	L	GF	GA	GD	Pts	Qualification or relegation
1	Galatasaray (C)	34	24	5	5	60	35	+25	77	Qualification for the Champions League group stage
2	Fenerbahçe	34	22	8	4	60	29	+31	74	Qualification for the Champions League third qualifying round
3	Beşiktaş	34	21	6	7	55	32	+23	69	Qualification for the Europa League group stage
4	Başakşehir	34	15	14	5	49	30	+19	59	Qualification for the Europa League third qualifying round
5	Trabzonspor	34	15	12	7	58	48	+10	57 (Note: Trabzonspor finished ahead of Bursaspor on head-to-head record: Trabzonspor–Bursaspor 1–0, Bursaspor–Trabzonspor 3–3.)	Qualification for the Europa League second qualifying round

Source: Süper Lig
Rules for classification: 1) points; 2) head-to-head points; 3) head-to-head goal difference; 4) goal difference; 5) number of goals scored (It is also decided that only criteria 1, 4 and 5 would be applied to establish the classification during the competition)
(C) Champions

=== Results summary ===
Overall								Home						Away					
Pld	W	D	L	GF	GA	GD	Pts	W	D	L	GF	GA	GD	W	D	L	GF	GA	GD
34	22	8	4	60	29	+31	74	13	3	1	30	14	+16	9	5	3	30	15	+15

=== Results by round ===
Round	1	2	3	4	5	6	7	8	9	10	11	12	13	14	15	16	17	18	19	20	21	22	23	24	25	26	27	28	29	30	31	32	33	34
Ground	H	A	H	A	H	A	H	A	H	A	H	A	H	A	H	H	A	A	H	A	H	A	H	A	H	A	H	A	H	A	H	A	A	H
Result	W	D	W	L	W	L	W	W	W	D	D	W	W	W	W	W	W	W	D	W	L	D	W	L	W	W	W	D	W	W	D	W	D	W
Position	2	4	2	6	4	5	4	1	1	2	3	3	3	3	2	1	1	1	2	2	3	3	3	3	3	2	1	3	3	2	2	2	2	2

A = Away; H = Home; W = Win; D = Draw; L = Loss

=== Matches ===
Win Draw Loss Postponed

31 August 2014 1	Fenerbahçe	3–2	Karabükspor	Istanbul
21:00 EEST	Emenike 8'; Sow 53'; Webó 81'	Report	Kumbela 34'; Kadlec 67' (o.g.)	Stadium: Şükrü Saracoğlu Stadium; Attendance: 22,000; Referee: Mustafa İlker Coşkun

14 September 2014 2	Trabzonspor	0–0	Fenerbahçe	Trabzon
20:00 EEST		Report		Stadium: Hüseyin Avni Aker; Attendance: 18,000; Referee: Fırat Aydınus

21 September 2014 3	Fenerbahçe	1–0	Gaziantepspor	Istanbul
20:00 EEST	Belözoğlu 81' (pen.)	Report		Stadium: Şükrü Saracoğlu Stadium; Attendance: 20,000; Referee: Ali Palabıyık

28 September 2014 4	Akhisar Belediyespor	2–0	Fenerbahçe	Manisa
19:00 EEST	Gekas 22', 48'	Report		Stadium: Manisa 19 Mayıs Stadium; Attendance: 8,500; Referee: Deniz Çoban

4 October 2014 5	Fenerbahçe	2–1	Konyaspor	Istanbul
21:00 EEST	Webó 27'; Sow 50'	Report	Rangelov 43' (pen.)	Stadium: Şükrü Saracoğlu Stadium; Attendance: 13,700; Referee: Mete Kalkavan

18 October 2014 6	Galatasaray	2–1	Fenerbahçe	Istanbul
19:00 EEST	Sneijder 88', 90+1'	Report	Potuk 90+5'	Stadium: Türk Telekom Arena; Attendance: 37,598; Referee: Cüneyt Çakır

25 October 2014 7	Fenerbahçe	2–1	Gençlerbirliği	Istanbul
19:00 EEST	Belözoğlu 50' (pen.); Kuyt 86' (pen.)	Report	Antal 81'	Stadium: Şükrü Saracoğlu Stadium; Attendance: 21,000; Referee: Özgür Yankaya

2 November 2014 8	Beşiktaş	0–2	Fenerbahçe	Istanbul
19:00 EEST		Report	Emenike 3'; Sow 86'	Stadium: Atatürk Olympic Stadium; Attendance: 29,750; Referee: Bülent Yıldırım

8 November 2014 9	Fenerbahçe	2–1	Çaykur Rizespor	Istanbul
20:30 EEST	Kadlec 41'; Webó 80'	Report	Kadlec 6' (o.g.)	Stadium: Şükrü Saracoğlu Stadium; Attendance: 18,000; Referee: İlker Meral

24 November 2014 10	Bursaspor	1–1	Fenerbahçe	Bursa
20:00 EEST	Şen 3'	Report	Kuyt 66'	Stadium: Bursa Atatürk Stadium; Attendance: 19,000; Referee: Fırat Aydınus

30 November 2014 11	Fenerbahçe	2–2	Eskişehirspor	Istanbul
19:00 EEST	Webó 70'; Sow 90+3' (pen.)	Report	Zengin 28'; Funes Mori 87'	Stadium: Şükrü Saracoğlu Stadium; Attendance: 15,036; Referee: Tolga Özkalfa

6 December 2014 12	Balıkesirspor	0–1	Fenerbahçe	Balıkesir
19:00 EEST		Report	Meireles 40'	Stadium: Balıkesir Atatürk Stadium; Attendance: 12,500; Referee: Halis Özkahya

12 December 2014 13	Fenerbahçe	4–1	Sivasspor	Istanbul
20:00 EEST	İrtegün 3'; Sow 14', 65'; Kuyt 39'	Report	Chahechouhe 13'	Stadium: Şükrü Saracoğlu Stadium; Attendance: 14,000; Referee: Mustafa İlker Coşkun

19 December 2014 14	Kayseri Erciyesspor	0–1	Fenerbahçe	Kayseri
20:00 EEST		Report	Belözoğlu 85' (pen.)	Stadium: Kadir Has Stadium; Attendance: 6,000; Referee: Hüseyin Göçek

27 December 2014 15	Fenerbahçe	1–0	Mersin İdman Yurdu	Istanbul
19:00 EEST	Topal 32'	Report		Stadium: Şükrü Saracoğlu Stadium; Attendance: 9,200; Referee: Bülent Yıldırım

3 January 2015 16	Fenerbahçe	2–0	İstanbul Başakşehir	Istanbul
19:00 EEST	Kuyt 19'; Potuk 49'	Report		Stadium: Şükrü Saracoğlu Stadium; Attendance: 10,000; Referee: Fırat Aydınus

24 January 2015 17	Kasımpaşa	0–3	Fenerbahçe	Istanbul
19:00 EEST		Report	Kuyt 15', 69'; Erkin 90+4'	Stadium: Recep Tayyip Erdoğan Stadium; Attendance: 8.900; Referee: Mete Kalkavan

31 January 2015 18	Kardemir Karabükspor	1–2	Fenerbahçe	Karabük
19:00 EEST	Traoré 75'	Report	Şahin 7'; Emenike 58'	Stadium: Dr. Necmettin Şeyhoğlu Stadium; Attendance: 11,500; Referee: Cüneyt Çakır

7 February 2015 19	Fenerbahçe	0–0	Trabzonspor	Istanbul
19:00 EEST		Report		Stadium: Şükrü Saracoğlu Stadium; Attendance: 36,000; Referee: Bülent Yıldırım

14 February 2015 20	Gaziantepspor	0–5	Fenerbahçe	Gaziantep
19:00 EEST		Report	Emenike 7'; Kuyt 58'; Sow 60', 68'; Belözoğlu 73' (pen.)	Stadium: Kamil Ocak Stadium; Attendance: 7,500; Referee: Halis Özkahya

23 February 2015 21	Fenerbahçe	1–2	Akhisar Belediyespor	Istanbul
20:00 EEST	Meireles 41'	Report	Vural 5'; Vaz Tê 89'	Stadium: Şükrü Saracoğlu Stadium; Attendance: 18.350; Referee: Özgür Yankaya

28 February 2015 22	Konyaspor	1–1	Fenerbahçe	Konya
19:00 EEST	Mahlangu 8'	Report	Korkmaz 67'	Stadium: New Konya Stadium; Attendance: 40,600; Referee: Ali Palabıyık

8 March 2015 23	Fenerbahçe	1–0	Galatasaray	Istanbul
19:00 EEST	Kuyt 81'	Report		Stadium: Şükrü Saracoğlu Stadium; Attendance: 52,500; Referee: Cüneyt Çakır

15 March 2015 24	Gençlerbirliği	2–1	Fenerbahçe	Ankara
19:00 EEST	Petrović 37'; El Kabir 87'	Report	Topal 72'	Stadium: Ankara 19 Mayıs Stadium; Attendance: 8,000; Referee: Halis Özkahya

22 March 2015 25	Fenerbahçe	1–0	Beşiktaş	Istanbul
19:00 EEST	Sow 90+1'	Report		Stadium: Şükrü Saracoğlu Stadium; Attendance: 28,000; Referee: Fırat Aydınus

4 April 2015 26	Çaykur Rizespor	1–5	Fenerbahçe	Rize
19:00 EEST	Deniz 62'	Report	Topuz 5'; Sow 8', 35'; Webó 49'; Erkin 55'	Stadium: Yeni Rize Şehir Stadı; Attendance: 7,200; Referee: Cüneyt Çakır

20 April 2015 27	Fenerbahçe	1–0	Bursaspor	Istanbul
20:00 EEST	Webó 84'	Report		Stadium: Şükrü Saracoğlu Stadium; Attendance: 29,000; Referee: Hüseyin Göçek

25 April 2015 28	Eskişehirspor	1–1	Fenerbahçe	Eskişehir
19:00 EEST	Güral 80'	Report	Yumlu 33' (o.g.)	Stadium: Eskişehir Atatürk Stadium; Attendance: 9,000; Referee: Mustafa Kamil Abitoğlu

2 May 2015 29	Fenerbahçe	4–3	Balıkesirspor	Istanbul
19:00 EEST	Erkin 8'; Diego 26'; Sow 44', 50'	Report	Promise 15'; Kulušić 21'; Emir 40'	Stadium: Şükrü Saracoğlu Stadium; Attendance: 17,700; Referee: Bülent Yıldırım

9 May 2015 30	Sivasspor	2–3	Fenerbahçe	Sivas
19:00 EEST	Taouil 8'; Cicinho 24'	Report	Diego 9'; Webó 56'; Sow 87'	Stadium: Sivas 4 Eylül Stadium; Attendance: 12,000; Referee: Halis Özkahya

13 May 2015 31	Fenerbahçe	1–1	Kayseri Erciyesspor	Istanbul
19:45 EEST	Korkmaz 2'	Report	Zoua 6'	Stadium: Şükrü Saracoğlu Stadium; Attendance: 15,000; Referee: Mete Kalkavan

17 May 2015 32	Mersin İdman Yurdu	0–1	Fenerbahçe	Mersin
20:00 EEST		Report	Belözoğlu 90+2'	Stadium: Mersin Arena; Attendance: 15,000; Referee: Cüneyt Çakır

25 May 2015 33	İstanbul Başakşehir	2–2	Fenerbahçe	Istanbul
20:00 EEST	Batdal 53', 62'	Report	Diego 81'; Webó 88'	Stadium: Başakşehir Fatih Terim Stadium; Attendance: 6,000; Referee: Ali Palabıyık

30 May 2015 34	Fenerbahçe	2–0	Kasımpaşa	Istanbul
16:00 EEST	Belözoğlu 72'; Potuk 81'	Report		Stadium: Şükrü Saracoğlu Stadium; Attendance: 1,000; Referee: Fırat Aydınus

== Türkiye Kupası ==
=== Group stage ===
Pos	Team	Pld	W	D	L	GF	GA	GD	Pts
1	Kayserispor	6	3	2	1	11	7	+4	11
2	Fenerbahçe	6	3	2	1	13	6	+7	11
3	Bayburt Grup Özel İdarespor	6	2	1	3	9	12	−3	7
4	Altınordu	6	1	1	4	4	12	−8	4

2 December 2014 1	Fenerbahçe	1–2	Kayserispor	Istanbul
20:30 EEST	Koca 31'	Report	Şahin 39'; Simić 89'	Stadium: Şükrü Saracoğlu Stadium; Attendance: 1,500; Referee: Serkan Çınar

15 December 2014 2	Bayburt Grup Özel İdarespor	1–3	Fenerbahçe	Bayburt
13:30 EEST	Seker 45' (pen.)	Report	Webó 2', 34'; Topuz 65'	Stadium: Genç Osman Stadium; Attendance: 5,000; Referee: Serkan Tokat

24 December 2014 3	Fenerbahçe	1–1	Altınordu	Istanbul
20:00 EEST	Diego 81'	Report	Balcı 50'	Stadium: Şükrü Saracoğlu Stadium; Attendance: 650; Referee: Çağatay Şahan

20 January 2015 4	Altınordu	1–2	Fenerbahçe	İzmir
20:30 EEST	Balcı 45+3'	Report	Topuz 33'; Abdioğlu 79' (o.g.)	Stadium: İzmir Atatürk Stadium; Attendance: 42,500; Referee: Koray Gençerler

28 January 2015 5	Kayserispor	1–1	Fenerbahçe	Kayseri
20:30 EEST	Bakış 16'	Report	İrtegün 80'	Stadium: Kadir Has Stadium; Attendance: 8,000; Referee: Yunus Yıldırım

4 February 2015 6	Fenerbahçe	5–0	Bayburt Özel İdarespor	Istanbul
20:00 EEST	Webó 18', 64', 74'; Civelek 21'; Topal 34'	Report		Stadium: Şükrü Saracoğlu Stadium; Attendance: 10,000; Referee: Serkan Çınar

=== Round of 16 ===
11 February 2015 Round of 16	Çaykur Rizespor	1–4	Fenerbahçe	Rize
20:45 EEST	Ovacıklı 61'	Report	Kadlec 24'; İrtegün 68'; Topal 86'; Sow 88'	Stadium: Yeni Rize Şehir Stadı; Attendance: 6,800; Referee: Ali Palabıyık

=== Quarter-finals ===
4 March 2015 First leg	Mersin İdman Yurdu	1–2	Fenerbahçe	Mersin
20:30 EEST	Welliton 74'	Report	Diego 43'; Sow 44'	Stadium: Tevfik Sırrı Gür Stadium; Attendance: 9,200; Referee: Yunus Yıldırım

16 April 2015 Second leg	Fenerbahçe	4–1 (6–2 agg.)	Mersin İdman Yurdu	Istanbul
19:45 EEST	Kuyt 6', 31' (pen.); Kaldırım 49'; Erkin 61'	Report	Futács 72'	Stadium: Şükrü Saracoğlu Stadium; Attendance: 3,500; Referee: Mustafa İlker Coşkun

=== Semi-finals ===
29 April 2015 First leg	Bursaspor	1–2	Fenerbahçe	Bursa
20:30 EEST	Belluschi 33'	Report	Emenike 26'; Alves 36'	Stadium: Bursa Atatürk Stadium; Attendance: 24,000; Referee: Cüneyt Çakır

21 May 2015 Second leg	Fenerbahçe	0–3 (2–4 agg.)	Bursaspor	Istanbul
20:30 EEST		Report	Şen 33'; Fernandão 76'; Çinaz 84'	Stadium: Şükrü Saracoğlu Stadium; Attendance: 17,500; Referee: Bülent Yıldırım

== See also ==
- 2014 Turkish Super Cup
- 2014–15 Süper Lig
- 2014–15 Turkish Cup
