= 2015–16 Fenerbahçe S.K. season =

Fenerbahçe
2015–16 season
- President: Aziz Yıldırım
- Head coach: Vítor Pereira
- Stadium: Şükrü Saracoğlu Stadium
- Süper Lig: 2nd
- Turkish Cup: Runners-up
- UEFA Champions League: Third qualifying round
- UEFA Europa League: Round of 16
- Top goalscorer: League: Robin van Persie (16); All: Fernandão (25)
- Highest home attendance: 45,070 (vs Galatasaray, 25 October 2015)
- Lowest home attendance: 6,339 (vs Gençlerbirliği, 15 May 2016)
- Average home league attendance: 28,589
| Home colours | Away colours | Third colours |

The 2015–16 season was Fenerbahçe's 58th consecutive season in the Süper Lig and their 109th year in existence.

== Season overview ==
- On 10 April 2015, Dirk Kuyt has signed to Feyenoord to play next year since his contract expired on 31 May 2015.
- On 11 June 2015, Fenerbahçe have released a statement on their official website confirming that Portuguese manager Vítor Pereira has been appointed manager on a two-year deal.
- On 17 June 2015, Centre back Simon Kjær signed a four-year contract with Fenerbahçe from Lille for a €7.65 million fee.
- On 22 June 2015, Mert Günok has signed a three-year contract with Bursaspor after his contract expired on 31 May 2015.
- On 23 June 2015, Fenerbahçe officially signed a four-year contract with Bursaspor former right back Şener Özbayraklı for ₺5.0 million.
- On 25 June 2015, Fenerbahçe have completed the signing of Atlético Paranaense striker Fernandão on a four-year deal the club revealed.
- On 27 June 2015, Fenerbahçe part ways with Emre Belözoğlu. The club said that the 34-year-old central midfielder is not in the team manager's future plans thus his deal has not been renewed.
- On 2 July 2015, Fenerbahçe has taken on loan two players, Brazilian goalkeeper Fabiano and Senegalese centre-back Abdoulaye Ba, from the Portuguese club Porto for one season.
- On 3 July 2015, Fenerbahçe are in talks to sign winger Nani from Manchester United. The club announced the news on social media on Thursday night, saying on Twitter: "Fenerbahçe has begun talks with Nani and his club Manchester United to transfer the player. Nani will be in Istanbul on Sunday for a medical check up."
- On 3 July 2015, Fenerbahçe have completed the signing of São Paulo defensive midfielder Souza for an €8 million transfer fee the club revealed. On 4 July, have released a statement on their official website confirming that talks are underway with both São Paulo and their midfielder Josef de Souza. On 7 July 2015, Souza was named an official Fenerbahçe player.
- On 6 July 2015, Fenerbahçe have completed the signing of Manchester United winger Nani. Fenerbahçe have announced the signing of Nani from Manchester United for €6 million.
- On 8 July 2015, Nigerian striker Emmanuel Emenike has joined United Arab Emirates Pro League side Al-Ain on loan until the end of the season.
- On 9 July 2015, Fenerbahçe has begun to transfer talks with Robin van Persie and his club Manchester United.
- On 12 July 2015, Manchester United striker Robin van Persie has arrived in Istanbul’s Sabiha Gökçen Airport on Sunday at 8:00pm local time with his family in a private plane to complete his move to Fenerbahçe. On 13 July van Persie underwent health screening in Istanbul.
- On 14 July 2015, Robin van Persie has completed his move from Manchester United to Fenerbahçe for an undisclosed fee. The Netherlands striker, 31, was unveiled in front of about 10,000 supporters inside the club's stadium. He said: "I promise you one thing - I will do everything in my power to help Fenerbahce win as many trophies to make you happy. Let's do it together."
- On 17 July 2015, Fenerbahçe is to face Ukraine's Shakhtar Donetsk in the Champions League third qualifying round following a draw at UEFA headquarters in Nyon, Switzerland, on Friday. The Ukrainian side will travel to Istanbul in the first leg to face Fenerbahçe, which returns to UEFA competitions after two years.
- On 5 August 2015, Fenerbahçe was sent crashing out of the UEFA Champions League by Shakhtar Donetsk after lose with 3–0 in Arena Lviv. (Note: Shakhtar Donetsk will play their home match at Arena Lviv, Lviv, instead of their regular stadium Donbas Arena, Donetsk, due to the War in Donbas.)
- On 7 August 2015, Fenerbahçe, drawn against Atromitos of Greece in the UEFA Europa League play-off round.
- On 13 August 2015, Fenerbahçe officially signed a five-year contract with Ozan Tufan by €7.0M.
- On 14 August 2015, Fenerbahçe officially signed a three-year contract with Volkan Şen by €1.0M.

== Kits ==
- Supplier: Adidas
- Main sponsor: Yandex
- Main sponsor (Europe): Turkish Airlines
- Back sponsor: Halley
- Sleeve sponsor: Coca-Cola
- Short sponsor: Integral Forex
- Socks sponsor: –

Home
Away
Third

=== Kit information ===
Adidas and Fenerbahçe extended their kit deal in February 2014 at least until 2018–19, while it is reported that the Adidas Fenerbahçe is worth $8.5M season. Adidas produces the new Fenerbahçe 2015–16 Kits which feature no shirt sponsor as of now. The new Fenerbahçe 15–16 Away and Third Kits were released on 7 July 2015.

== Transfers ==
=== In ===
| No. | Pos. | Nat. | Name | Age | Moving from | Type | Transfer window | Ends | Transfer fee | Source |
|---|---|---|---|---|---|---|---|---|---|---|
| 4 | CB | (Denmark) | Simon Kjær | 26 | Lille (France) | Transfer | Summer | 2019 | €7.65M | Fenerbahce.org |
| 19 | RB | (Turkey) | Şener Özbayraklı | 25 | Bursaspor | Transfer | Summer | 2019 | €1.63M | Fenerbahce.org |
| 9 | ST | (Brazil) | Fernandão | 28 | Paranaense (Brazil) | Transfer | Summer | 2019 | €3.40M | Fenerbahce.org |
| 40 | GK | (Brazil) | Fabiano | 27 | Porto (Portugal) | Loan | Summer | 2016 | Free | Fenerbahce.org |
| 53 | CB | (Senegal) | Abdoulaye Ba | 24 | Porto (Portugal) | Loan | Summer | 2016 | Free | Fenerbahce.org |
| 17 | MF | (Portugal) | Nani | 28 | Manchester United (England) | Transfer | Summer | 2018 | €6.0M | Fenerbahce.org |
| 6 | CM | (Brazil) | Souza | 26 | São Paulo (Brazil) | Transfer | Summer | 2019 | €8.0M | Fenerbahce.org |
| 11 | FW | (Netherlands) | Robin van Persie | 32 | Manchester United (England) | Transfer | Summer | 2019 | €6.6M | Fenerbahce.org |
| 8 | MF | (Turkey) | Ozan Tufan | 20 | Bursaspor | Transfer | Summer | 2020 | €7.0M | Fenerbahce.org |
| 20 | MF | (Turkey) | Volkan Şen | 28 | Bursaspor | Transfer | Summer | 2018 | €2.5M | Fenerbahce.org |
| 50 | MF | (Serbia) | Lazar Marković | 21 | Liverpool (England) | Loan | Summer | 2016 | Free | Fenerbahce.org |
| 29 | FW | (Nigeria) | Emmanuel Emenike | 28 | Al-Ain (United Arab Emirates) | End of loan | Winter | 2016 | Free | |

=== Out ===
| No. | Pos. | Nat. | Name | Age | Moving to | Type | Transfer window | Transfer fee | Source |
|---|---|---|---|---|---|---|---|---|---|
| 11 | RW | (Netherlands) | Dirk Kuyt | 34 | Feyenoord (Netherlands) | End of contract | Summer | Free | feyenoord.com |
| 9 | ST | (Cameroon) | Pierre Webó | 33 | Osmanlıspor | End of contract | Summer | Free | Fenerbahce.org |
| 21 | DM | (Turkey) | Selçuk Şahin | 34 | FC Wil (Switzerland) | End of contract | Summer | Free | Fenerbahce.org |
| 4 | CB | (Turkey) | Bekir İrtegün | 31 | İstanbul Başakşehir | End of contract | Summer | Free | Fenerbahce.org |
| 2 | CB | (Turkey) | Egemen Korkmaz | 32 | FC Wil (Switzerland) | End of contract | Summer | Free | Fenerbahce.org |
| 20 | CM | (Turkey) | Emre Belözoğlu | 34 | İstanbul Başakşehir | End of contract | Summer | Free | ibfk.com.tr |
| 34 | GK | (Turkey) | Mert Günok | 26 | Bursaspor | End of contract | Summer | Free | bursaspor.org.tr |
| 28 | FW | (Turkey) | Beykan Şimşek | 20 | Sivasspor | Loan | Summer | Free | sivasspor.org.tr |
| 29 | FW | (Nigeria) | Emmanuel Emenike | 28 | Al-Ain (United Arab Emirates) | Loan | Summer | €3.50M | |
| 7 | FW | (Senegal) | Moussa Sow | 29 | Al-Ahli (United Arab Emirates) | Transfer | Summer | €16.00M | Fenerbahce.org |
| 27 | MF | (Serbia) | Miloš Krasić | 30 | Lechia Gdańsk (Poland) | Transfer | Summer | Free | Fenerbahce.org |
| 99 | MF | (Slovakia) | Miroslav Stoch | 25 | Bursaspor | Loan | Summer | Free | |
| 8 | MF | (Sweden) | Samuel Holmén | 31 | Konyaspor | Loan | Summer | Free | |
| 41 | MF | (Turkey) | Hakan Çinemre | 21 | Gaziantepspor | Loan | Winter | Free | |
| 29 | FW | (Nigeria) | Emmanuel Emenike | 28 | West Ham United (England) | Loan | Winter | €1.00M | |

Total spending: ▼€42,780,000
Total income: ▲€20,500,000
Expenditure: ▼€22,280,000

== Squad ==
=== First team squad ===
| No. | Name | Position (s) | Nationality | Place of Birth | Date of Birth (Age) | Club caps | Club goals | Signed from | Date signed | Fee | Contract End |
Goalkeepers
| 1 | Volkan Demirel | GK | (Turkey) | Istanbul | 27 October 1981 (aged 34) | 410 | 0 | Kartalspor | 6 August 2002 | Free | 30 June 2017 |
| 40 | Fabiano | GK | (Brazil) | Mundo Novo, Brazil | 29 February 1988 (aged 28) | 17 | 0 | (Portugal) Porto | 2 July 2015 | Free | 30 June 2016 |
| 25 | Ertuğrul Taşkıran | GK | (Turkey) | Istanbul | 5 November 1989 (aged 26) | 3 | 0 | Academy | 1 July 2010 | Trainee | 30 June 2019 |
| 54 | Erten Ersu | GK | (Turkey) | Istanbul | 21 April 1994 (aged 22) | 2 | 0 | Academy | 1 July 2013 | Trainee | 30 June 2019 |
Defenders
| 3 | Hasan Ali Kaldırım | DF | (Turkey) | Neuwied, Germany | 9 December 1989 (aged 26) | 106 | 3 | Kayserispor | 1 July 2012 | €3,750,000 | 30 June 2017 |
| 4 | Simon Kjær | DF | (Denmark) | Horsens, Denmark | 26 March 1989 (aged 27) | 45 | 2 | (France) Lille | 17 June 2015 | €7,650,000 | 30 June 2019 |
| 19 | Şener Özbayraklı | DF | (Turkey) | Borçka | 23 January 1990 (aged 26) | 32 | 2 | Bursaspor | 23 June 2015 | €1,630,000 | 30 June 2019 |
| 22 | Bruno Alves | DF | (Portugal) | Póvoa de Varzim, Portugal | 16 November 1981 (aged 34) | 101 | 4 | (Russia) Zenit | 1 July 2013 | €5,500,000 | 30 June 2016 |
| 24 | Michal Kadlec | DF | (Czech Republic) | Vyškov, Czech Republic | 13 December 1984 (aged 31) | 63 | 4 | (Germany) Bayer Leverkusen | 1 July 2013 | €4,500,000 | 30 June 2016 |
| 41 | Hakan Çinemre | DF | (Turkey) | Kocaeli | 14 February 1994 (aged 22) | 1 | 0 | Academy | 1 July 2013 | Trainee | 30 June 2016 |
| 53 | Abdoulaye Ba | DF | (Senegal) | Saint-Louis, Senegal | 1 January 1991 (aged 25) | 18 | 1 | (Portugal) Porto | 2 July 2015 | Free | 30 June 2016 |
| 77 | Gökhan Gönül | DF | (Turkey) | Samsun | 5 January 1985 (aged 31) | 339 | 12 | Hacettepe | 1 July 2007 | €1,400,000 | 30 June 2016 |
| 88 | Caner Erkin | DF | (Turkey) | Balıkesir | 4 October 1988 (aged 27) | 213 | 16 | (Russia) CSKA Moscow | 30 June 2010 | €2,000,000 | 30 June 2016 |
Midfielders
| 5 | Mehmet Topal | MF | (Turkey) | Malatya | 3 March 1986 (aged 30) | 176 | 14 | (Spain) Valencia | 1 July 2012 | €4,500,000 | 30 June 2016 |
| 6 | Souza | MF | (Brazil) | Rio de Janeiro, Brazil | 11 February 1989 (aged 27) | 48 | 4 | (Brazil) São Paulo | 7 July 2015 | €8,000,000 | 30 June 2019 |
| 8 | Ozan Tufan | MF | (Turkey) | Orhaneli | 23 March 1995 (aged 21) | 45 | 1 | Bursaspor | 13 August 2015 | €7,000,000 | 30 June 2020 |
| 10 | Diego | MF | (Brazil) | Ribeirão Preto, Brazil | 28 February 1985 (aged 31) | 75 | 8 | (Spain) Atlético Madrid | 11 July 2014 | Free | 30 June 2017 |
| 14 | Raul Meireles | MF | (Portugal) | Porto, Portugal | 17 March 1983 (aged 33) | 105 | 8 | (England) Chelsea | 3 September 2012 | €10,000,000 | 30 June 2016 |
| 15 | Uygar Mert Zeybek | MF | (Turkey) | Osmangazi | 4 June 1995 (aged 20) | 19 | 1 | Academy | 1 July 2015 | Trainee | 30 June 2016 |
| 17 | Nani | MF | (Portugal) | Praia, Cape Verde | 17 November 1986 (aged 29) | 53 | 14 | (England) Manchester United | 6 July 2015 | €6,000,000 | 30 June 2018 |
| 20 | Volkan Şen | MF | (Turkey) | Bursa | 7 July 1987 (aged 28) | 43 | 7 | Bursaspor | 14 August 2015 | €1,000,000 | 30 June 2018 |
| 26 | Alper Potuk | MF | (Turkey) | Afyonkarahisar | 8 April 1991 (aged 25) | 115 | 9 | Eskişehirspor | 22 May 2013 | €6,250,000 | 30 June 2018 |
| 38 | Mehmet Topuz | MF | (Turkey) | Yozgat | 7 September 1983 (aged 32) | 216 | 13 | Kayserispor | 13 June 2009 | €9,000,000 | 30 June 2016 |
| 50 | Lazar Marković | MF | (Serbia) | Čačak, Serbia | 2 March 1994 (aged 22) | 21 | 2 | (England) Liverpool | 30 August 2015 | Loan | 30 June 2016 |
| | Miroslav Stoch | MF | (Slovakia) | Nitra, Slovakia | 19 October 1989 (aged 26) | 107 | 15 | (England) Chelsea | 1 July 2010 | €5,500,000 | 30 June 2018 |
Forwards
| 9 | Fernandão | FW | (Brazil) | Rio de Janeiro, Brazil | 27 March 1987 (aged 29) | 55 | 25 | (Brazil) Atlético Paranaense | 25 June 2015 | €3,400,000 | 30 June 2019 |
| 11 | Robin van Persie | FW | (Netherlands) | Rotterdam, Netherlands | 6 August 1983 (aged 32) | 48 | 22 | (England) Manchester United | 14 July 2015 | €5,500,000 | 30 June 2018 |

As of 26 May 2016

== Squad statistics ==
| No. | Nat. | Player | Süper Lig | | | | Turkish Cup | | | | Europe | | | | Total | | | |
| No. | Nat. | Player | Apps | Goal | Yellow card | Red card | Apps | Goal | Yellow card | Red card | Apps | Goal | Yellow card | Red card | Apps | Goal | Yellow card | Red card |
|---|---|---|---|---|---|---|---|---|---|---|---|---|---|---|---|---|---|---|
| 1 | (Turkey) | Volkan Demirel | 32 | 0 | 3 | 0 | 1 | 0 | 0 | 0 | 7 | 0 | 2 | 0 | 40 | 0 | 5 | 0 |
| 3 | (Turkey) | Hasan Ali Kaldırım | 26 | 1 | 4 | 1 | 6 | 0 | 0 | 0 | 6 | 0 | 1 | 0 | 38 | 1 | 5 | 1 |
| 4 | (Denmark) | Simon Kjær | 28 | 2 | 5 | 0 | 6 | 0 | 1 | 0 | 11 | 0 | 4 | 1 | 45 | 2 | 10 | 1 |
| 5 | (Turkey) | Mehmet Topal | 33 | 1 | 4 | 0 | 7 | 0 | 2 | 0 | 13 | 2 | 2 | 1 | 53 | 3 | 8 | 1 |
| 6 | (Brazil) | Souza | 31 | 1 | 6 | 0 | 5 | 1 | 2 | 0 | 12 | 2 | 3 | 0 | 48 | 4 | 11 | 0 |
| 8 | (Turkey) | Ozan Tufan | 26 | 0 | 4 | 0 | 10 | 0 | 2 | 0 | 9 | 1 | 2 | 0 | 45 | 1 | 8 | 0 |
| 9 | (Brazil) | Fernandão | 28 | 13 | 5 | 0 | 11 | 6 | 2 | 0 | 13 | 6 | 1 | 0 | 52 | 25 | 8 | 0 |
| 10 | (Brazil) | Diego | 28 | 2 | 3 | 0 | 7 | 1 | 1 | 0 | 10 | 0 | 1 | 1 | 45 | 3 | 5 | 1 |
| 11 | (Netherlands) | Robin van Persie | 31 | 16 | 2 | 0 | 6 | 6 | 0 | 0 | 12 | 1 | 2 | 0 | 49 | 23 | 4 | 0 |
| 14 | (Portugal) | Raul Meireles | 11 | 1 | 2 | 0 | 3 | 0 | 0 | 0 | 7 | 0 | 1 | 0 | 21 | 1 | 3 | 0 |
| 15 | (Turkey) | Uygar Mert Zeybek | 1 | 0 | 0 | 0 | 7 | 1 | 1 | 0 | 1 | 0 | 0 | 0 | 9 | 1 | 1 | 0 |
| 17 | (Portugal) | Nani | 33 | 9 | 5 | 0 | 7 | 4 | 1 | 1 | 13 | 1 | 5 | 0 | 53 | 14 | 11 | 1 |
| 19 | (Turkey) | Şener Özbayraklı | 14 | 1 | 3 | 0 | 10 | 1 | 1 | 0 | 8 | 0 | 1 | 0 | 32 | 2 | 5 | 0 |
| 20 | (Turkey) | Volkan Şen | 25 | 5 | 3 | 0 | 8 | 2 | 2 | 0 | 10 | 0 | 0 | 1 | 43 | 7 | 5 | 1 |
| 22 | (Portugal) | Bruno Alves | 26 | 1 | 9 | 0 | 3 | 0 | 0 | 0 | 12 | 0 | 3 | 0 | 41 | 1 | 12 | 0 |
| 24 | (Czech Republic) | Michal Kadlec | 10 | 0 | 1 | 0 | 11 | 0 | 1 | 0 | 5 | 0 | 2 | 0 | 26 | 0 | 4 | 0 |
| 25 | (Turkey) | Ertuğrul Taşkıran | 0 | 0 | 0 | 0 | 3 | 0 | 0 | 0 | 0 | 0 | 0 | 0 | 3 | 0 | 0 | 0 |
| 26 | (Turkey) | Alper Potuk | 27 | 4 | 7 | 0 | 7 | 0 | 1 | 0 | 11 | 1 | 1 | 1 | 45 | 5 | 9 | 1 |
| 38 | (Turkey) | Mehmet Topuz | 3 | 0 | 1 | 0 | 8 | 1 | 1 | 0 | 0 | 0 | 0 | 0 | 11 | 1 | 2 | 0 |
| 40 | (Brazil) | Fabiano | 2 | 0 | 0 | 0 | 8 | 0 | 0 | 0 | 7 | 0 | 0 | 0 | 17 | 0 | 0 | 0 |
| 41 | (Turkey) | Hakan Çinemre | 0 | 0 | 0 | 0 | 0 | 0 | 0 | 0 | 0 | 0 | 0 | 0 | 0 | 0 | 0 | 0 |
| 53 | (Senegal) | Abdoulaye Ba | 6 | 1 | 1 | 0 | 7 | 0 | 0 | 0 | 5 | 0 | 1 | 0 | 18 | 1 | 2 | 0 |
| 50 | (Serbia) | Lazar Marković | 14 | 0 | 3 | 0 | 5 | 1 | 0 | 0 | 2 | 1 | 0 | 0 | 21 | 2 | 3 | 0 |
| 54 | (Turkey) | Erten Ersu | 0 | 0 | 0 | 0 | 1 | 0 | 0 | 0 | 0 | 0 | 0 | 0 | 1 | 0 | 0 | 0 |
| 77 | (Turkey) | Gökhan Gönül | 22 | 1 | 1 | 0 | 2 | 0 | 0 | 0 | 6 | 0 | 0 | 0 | 30 | 1 | 1 | 0 |
| 88 | (Turkey) | Caner Erkin | 13 | 0 | 4 | 0 | 4 | 1 | 1 | 0 | 10 | 0 | 4 | 0 | 27 | 1 | 9 | 0 |
As of 26 May 2016

== Statistics ==
As of 26 May 2016

=== Goals ===
| Pl. | Nat. | Player | Süper Lig | Türkiye Kupası | Europe | TOTAL |
|---|---|---|---|---|---|---|
| 1 | (Brazil) | Fernandão | 13 | 6 | 6 | 25 |
| 2 | (Netherlands) | Robin van Persie | 16 | 5 | 1 | 22 |
| 3 | (Portugal) | Nani | 9 | 4 | 1 | 14 |
| 4 | (Turkey) | Volkan Şen | 5 | 2 | 0 | 7 |
| 5 | (Turkey) | Alper Potuk | 4 | 0 | 1 | 5 |
| 6 | (Brazil) | Souza | 1 | 1 | 2 | 4 |
| 7 | (Brazil) | Diego | 2 | 1 | 0 | 3 |
| 7 | (Turkey) | Ramazan Civelek | 0 | 3 | 0 | 3 |
| 7 | (Turkey) | Mehmet Topal | 1 | 0 | 2 | 3 |
| 10 | (Denmark) | Simon Kjær | 2 | 0 | 0 | 2 |
| 10 | (Serbia) | Lazar Marković | 0 | 1 | 1 | 2 |
| 10 | (Turkey) | Şener Özbayraklı | 1 | 1 | 0 | 2 |
| 13 | (Portugal) | Bruno Alves | 1 | 0 | 0 | 1 |
| 13 | (Senegal) | Abdoulaye Ba | 1 | 0 | 0 | 1 |
| 13 | (Turkey) | Caner Erkin | 0 | 1 | 0 | 1 |
| 13 | (Turkey) | Gökhan Gönül | 1 | 0 | 0 | 1 |
| 13 | (Turkey) | Hasan Ali Kaldırım | 1 | 0 | 0 | 1 |
| 13 | (Portugal) | Raul Meireles | 1 | 0 | 0 | 1 |
| 13 | (Turkey) | Ozan Tufan | 0 | 0 | 1 | 1 |
| 13 | (Turkey) | Mehmet Topuz | 0 | 1 | 0 | 1 |
| 13 | (Turkey) | Uygar Mert Zeybek | 0 | 1 | 0 | 1 |
| 13 | (Turkey) | Yasir Subaşı | 0 | 1 | 0 | 1 |

=== Assists ===
| Pl. | Nat. | Player | Süper Lig | Türkiye Kupası | Europe | TOTAL |
|---|---|---|---|---|---|---|
| 1 | (Portugal) | Nani | 8 | 3 | 1 | 12 |
| 2 | (Turkey) | Alper Potuk | 5 | 1 | 1 | 7 |
| 2 | (Turkey) | Caner Erkin | 2 | 2 | 3 | 7 |
| 2 | (Turkey) | Volkan Şen | 4 | 2 | 1 | 7 |
| 5 | (Turkey) | Hasan Ali Kaldırım | 5 | 0 | 1 | 6 |
| 6 | (Brazil) | Diego | 4 | 1 | 0 | 5 |
| 6 | (Turkey) | Gökhan Gönül | 1 | 2 | 2 | 5 |
| 8 | (Turkey) | Şener Özbayraklı | 1 | 2 | 1 | 4 |
| 9 | (Turkey) | Mehmet Topal | 3 | 0 | 0 | 3 |
| 9 | (Netherlands) | Robin van Persie | 3 | 0 | 0 | 3 |
| 11 | (Serbia) | Lazar Marković | 2 | 0 | 0 | 2 |
| 12 | (Portugal) | Bruno Alves | 1 | 0 | 0 | 1 |
| 12 | (Brazil) | Fernandão | 1 | 0 | 0 | 1 |
| 12 | (Czech Republic) | Michal Kadlec | 0 | 1 | 0 | 1 |
| 12 | (Portugal) | Raul Meireles | 0 | 0 | 1 | 1 |
| 12 | (Turkey) | Ozan Tufan | 1 | 0 | 0 | 1 |
| 12 | (Turkey) | Ramazan Civelek | 0 | 1 | 0 | 1 |
| 12 | (Brazil) | Souza | 1 | 0 | 0 | 1 |

== Club hierarchy ==
=== Board of directors ===
| President | (Turkey) Aziz Yıldırım |
| Deputy Chairman | (Turkey) Mithat Yenigün |
| General Secretary and Press Officer | (Turkey) Mahmut Uslu |
| Investment Projects and Property Officer | (Turkey) Nihat Özbağı |
| Facilities and Fenercell Officer | (Turkey) Ömer Temelli |
| Accountant Member | (Turkey) İlhan Ekşioğlu |
| Vice President | (Turkey) Ali Yıldırım |
| Financial and Administrative Officer Configuration | (Turkey) Ender Alkaya |
| Fenerium Officer | (Turkey) Murat Özaydınlı |
| Legal Affairs and External Relations Officer | (Turkey) Şekip Mosturoğlu |
| Advertising, Marketing and Fundraising | (Turkey) Önder Fırat |
| Legal Affairs | (Turkey) Erhan Türkoğlu |
| Educational Facilities Officer | (Turkey) Mehmet Tahir Sarıoğlu |
| Advertising, Marketing Manager Assistant | (Turkey) Mehmet Selim Kosif |
| Responsible for Stadium | (Turkey) Metin Doğan |
| Responsible for Health Services | (Turkey) Mustafa Serdar Erkan |
| Stadium, Facilities Assistant Responsible | (Turkey) Ali Cenk Başak |
| Assistant Responsible for Training Facilities | (Turkey) Barış Altuğ Aydil |

=== Management ===
| Football Director | (Italy) Giuliano Terraneo |
| Manager | (Portugal) Vítor Pereira |
| Administrative Manager | (Turkey) Hasan Çetinkaya |
| Assistant Coach | (Portugal) Filipe Almeida |
| Assistant Coach | (Portugal) Luís Miguel |
| Assistant Coach | (Portugal) Pedro Ribeiro |
| Goalkeeper Coach | (Italy) Paolo Orlandoni |
| Doctor | (Turkey) Burak Kunduracıoğlu |
| Physiotherapist | (Turkey) Umut Şahin |
| Physiotherapist | (Turkey) Ata Özgür Ercan |
| Physiotherapist | (Turkey) Bülent Uyar |

Source: Fenerbahce.org

== Overall ==
| Trophy | Started round | First match | Last match | Result |
|---|---|---|---|---|
| Süper Lig | Matchday 1 | 14 August 2015 | 19 May 2016 | Runners–up |
| Türkiye Kupası | Group Stage | 16 December 2015 | 26 May 2016 | Runners–up |
| UEFA Champions League | Third qualifying round | 28 July 2015 | 5 August 2015 | Third qualifying round |
| UEFA Europa League | Play-off round | 20 August 2015 | 17 March 2016 | Round of 16 |

== Pre-season friendlies ==
| Date | Opponents | Stadium | Result F–A | Attendance | Notes |
|---|---|---|---|---|---|
| 1 July 2015 | (Romania) Voluntari | Topuk Yaylası | 2–1 | NA | |
| 7 July 2015 | (Turkey) Şanlıurfaspor | Topuk Yaylası | 1–0 | NA | |
| 11 July 2015 | (Iran) Zob Ahan | 18 Temmuz Stadyumu | 7–0 | NA | |
| 14 July 2015 | (Turkey) Sivasspor | Sivas 4 Eylül Stadium | 3–2 | NA | |
| 15 July 2015 | (Ukraine) Dnipro | Şükrü Saracoğlu Stadium | 0–1 | NA | |
| 18 July 2015 | (Portugal) Vitória | Şükrü Saracoğlu Stadium | 3–1 | NA | |
| 21 July 2015 | (Greece) Olympiacos | Afyon Arena | 3–2 | NA | |
| 22 July 2015 | (France) Marseille | Afyon Arena | 3–1 | NA | |

Win Draw Loss Postponed

== Süper Lig ==
=== League table ===
| Pos | Team | Pld | W | D | L | GF | GA | GD | Pts | Qualification or relegation |
|---|---|---|---|---|---|---|---|---|---|---|
| 1 | Beşiktaş (C) | 34 | 25 | 4 | 5 | 75 | 35 | +40 | 79 | Qualification for the Champions League group stage |
| 2 | Fenerbahçe | 34 | 22 | 8 | 4 | 60 | 27 | +33 | 74 | Qualification for the Champions League third qualifying round |
| 3 | Konyaspor | 34 | 19 | 9 | 6 | 44 | 33 | +11 | 66 | Qualification for the Europa League group stage (Note: Since the winners of the 2015–16 Turkish Cup, Galatasaray, were excluded from European competitions by UEFA, the Europa League group stage berth awarded to the Turkish Cup winners was transferred to the third-placed team (Konyaspor), the third qualifying round berth was awarded to the fourth-placed team (İstanbul Başakşehir), and the second qualifying round berth was awarded to the fifth-placed team (Osmanlıspor).) |
| 4 | İstanbul Başakşehir | 34 | 16 | 11 | 7 | 54 | 36 | +18 | 59 | Qualification for the Europa League third qualifying round |
| 5 | Osmanlıspor | 34 | 14 | 10 | 10 | 52 | 36 | +16 | 52 | Qualification for the Europa League second qualifying round |

Source: Süper Lig, Soccerway
Rules for classification: 1) Points; 2) Head-to-head points; 3) Head-to-head goal difference; 4) Head-to-head goals scored; 5) Goal difference; 6) Goals scored; 7) Play-off.
(C) Champions

=== Results summary ===
| Overall | | | | | | | | Home | | | | | | Away | | | | | |
| Pld | W | D | L | GF | GA | GD | Pts | W | D | L | GF | GA | GD | W | D | L | GF | GA | GD |
|---|---|---|---|---|---|---|---|---|---|---|---|---|---|---|---|---|---|---|---|
| 34 | 22 | 8 | 4 | 60 | 27 | +33 | 74 | 14 | 3 | 0 | 32 | 10 | +22 | 8 | 5 | 4 | 28 | 17 | +11 |

=== Results by round ===
| Round | 1 | 2 | 3 | 4 | 5 | 6 | 7 | 8 | 9 | 10 | 11 | 12 | 13 | 14 | 15 | 16 | 17 | 18 | 19 | 20 | 21 | 22 | 23 | 24 | 25 | 26 | 27 | 28 | 29 | 30 | 31 | 32 | 33 | 34 |
|---|---|---|---|---|---|---|---|---|---|---|---|---|---|---|---|---|---|---|---|---|---|---|---|---|---|---|---|---|---|---|---|---|---|---|
| Ground | H | A | H | A | H | A | H | A | H | A | H | A | H | A | H | A | H | A | H | A | H | A | H | A | H | A | H | A | H | A | H | A | H | A |
| Result | W | D | W | W | W | L | D | W | D | W | W | W | W | D | W | W | W | W | W | L | W | D | W | W | W | D | D | L | W | W | W | L | W | D |
| Position | 3 | 5 | 1 | 1 | 1 | 2 | 3 | 3 | 3 | 3 | 2 | 2 | 1 | 2 | 2 | 2 | 2 | 2 | 2 | 2 | 2 | 2 | 2 | 2 | 2 | 2 | 2 | 2 | 2 | 2 | 2 | 2 | 2 | 2 |

A = Away; H = Home; W = Win; D = Draw; L = Loss

=== Matches ===
| 14 August 2015 1 | Fenerbahçe | 2–0 | Eskişehirspor | Istanbul |
| 22:00 EEST | Sow 45+1'; Fernandão 45+4' | Report | | Stadium: Şükrü Saracoğlu Stadium; Attendance: 31,381; Referee: Fırat Aydınus |

| 23 August 2015 2 | Çaykur Rizespor | 1–1 | Fenerbahçe | Rize |
| 21:45 EEST | Kjær 74' (o.g.) | Report | Van Persie 16' | Stadium: Yeni Rize Şehir Stadı; Attendance: 6,500; Referee: Cüneyt Çakır |

| 30 August 2015 3 | Fenerbahçe | 2–1 | Antalyaspor | Istanbul |
| 21:15 EEST | Nani 42', 90+5' | Report | Gusmão 70' | Stadium: Şükrü Saracoğlu Stadium; Attendance: 32,314; Referee: Bülent Yıldırım |

| 13 September 2015 4 | Kasımpaşa | 0–1 | Fenerbahçe | Istanbul |
| 21:00 EEST | | Report | Souza 42' | Stadium: Recep Tayyip Erdoğan Stadium; Attendance: 4,189; Referee: Deniz Ateş Bitnel |

| 20 September 2015 5 | Fenerbahçe | 2–1 | Bursaspor | Istanbul |
| 20:00 EEST | Nani 20'; Van Persie 79' | Report | Necid 63' | Stadium: Şükrü Saracoğlu Stadium; Attendance: 30,529; Referee: Barış Şimşek |

| 27 September 2015 6 | Beşiktaş | 3–2 | Fenerbahçe | Istanbul |
| 19:00 EEST | Kjær 20' (o.g.); Gómez 24', 74' | Report | Tošić 32' (o.g.); Van Persie 65' | Stadium: Atatürk Olympic Stadium; Attendance: 27,356; Referee: Halis Özkahya |

| 4 October 2015 7 | Fenerbahçe | 2–2 | Akhisar Belediyespor | Istanbul |
| 20:00 EEST | Fernandão 11', 37' | Report | Güray 56' (pen.); Douglão 68' | Stadium: Şükrü Saracoğlu Stadium; Attendance: 29,402; Referee: Serkan Çınar |

| 18 October 2015 8 | Kayserispor | 0–1 | Fenerbahçe | Kayseri |
| 17:00 EEST | | Report | Van Persie 29' | Stadium: Kadir Has Stadium; Attendance: 13,060; Referee: Mete Kalkavan |

| 25 October 2015 9 | Fenerbahçe | 1–1 | Galatasaray | Istanbul |
| 19:00 EEST | Diego 37' | Report | Adın 84' | Stadium: Şükrü Saracoğlu Stadium; Attendance: 45,070; Referee: Fırat Aydınus |

| 29 October 2015 10 | Osmanlıspor | 0–1 | Fenerbahçe | Ankara |
| 19:00 EEST | | Report | Potuk 52' | Stadium: Yenikent Asaş Stadium; Attendance: 7,115; Referee: Hüseyin Göçek |

| 8 November 2015 11 | Fenerbahçe | 1–0 | Konyaspor | Istanbul |
| 17:00 EEST | Fernandão 77' | Report | | Stadium: Şükrü Saracoğlu Stadium; Attendance: 23,656; Referee: Ali Palabıyık |

| 21 November 2015 12 | Mersin İdmanyurdu | 1–3 | Fenerbahçe | Mersin |
| 17:00 EEST | Nakoulma 59' | Report | Kaldırım 8'; Nani 49'; Van Persie 57' | Stadium: Mersin Arena; Attendance: 11,800; Referee: Alper Ulusoy |

| 30 November 2015 13 | Fenerbahçe | 2–0 | Trabzonspor | Istanbul |
| 20:00 EEST | Nani 11'; Fernandão 88' | Report | | Stadium: Şükrü Saracoğlu Stadium; Attendance: 37,500; Referee: Deniz Ateş Bitnel |

| 6 December 2015 14 | Gaziantepspor | 2–2 | Fenerbahçe | Gaziantep |
| 19:00 EEST | Camara 6'; Demir 54' (pen.) | Report | Gönül 49'; Potuk 65' | Stadium: Kamil Ocak Stadium; Attendance: 7,535; Referee: Serkan Tokat |

| 13 December 2015 15 | Fenerbahçe | 1–0 | İstanbul Başakşehir | Istanbul |
| 19:00 EEST | Nani 84' | Report | | Stadium: Şükrü Saracoğlu Stadium; Attendance: 28,582; Referee: Cüneyt Çakır |

| 20 December 2015 16 | Gençlerbirliği | 0–1 | Fenerbahçe | Ankara |
| 19:00 EEST | | Report | Fernandão 34' | Stadium: Ankara 19 Mayıs Stadium; Attendance: 6,940; Referee: Mete Kalkavan |

| 28 December 2015 17 | Fenerbahçe | 2–1 | Sivasspor | Istanbul |
| 20:00 EEST | Van Persie 24'; Kjær 77' | Report | Şimşek 43' | Stadium: Şükrü Saracoğlu Stadium; Attendance: 28,151; Referee: Fırat Aydınus |

| 18 January 2016 18 | Eskişehirspor | 0–3 | Fenerbahçe | Eskişehir |
| 19:00 EEST | | Report | Fernandão 45' (pen.), 74'; Van Persie 85' | Stadium: Eskişehir Atatürk Stadium; Attendance: 8,269; Referee: Alper Ulusoy |

| 24 January 2016 19 | Fenerbahçe | 2–1 | Çaykur Rizespor | Istanbul |
| 16:00 EEST | Fernandão 29' (pen.), 40' (pen.) | Report | Sylvestre 47' (pen.) | Stadium: Şükrü Saracoğlu Stadium; Attendance: 25,148; Referee: Deniz Ateş Bitnel |

| 5 February 2016 20 | Antalyaspor | 4–2 | Fenerbahçe | Antalya |
| 20:00 EEST | Eto'o 40'; Danilo 54'; Makoun 56'; Aytaç 90+4' | Report | Alves 85'; Van Persie 90+6' (pen.) | Stadium: New Antalya Stadium; Attendance: 21,735; Referee: Ali Palabıyık |

| 12 February 2016 21 | Fenerbahçe | 3–1 | Kasımpaşa | Istanbul |
| 20:00 EEST | Diego 37'; Van Persie 45+2' (pen.); Potuk 75' | Report | Malki 87' | Stadium: Şükrü Saracoğlu Stadium; Attendance: 24,577; Referee: Bülent Yıldırım |

| 20 February 2016 22 | Bursaspor | 0–0 | Fenerbahçe | Bursa |
| 19:00 EEST | | Report | | Stadium: Timsah Arena; Attendance: 0 Referee: Mete Kalkavan |

| 29 February 2016 23 | Fenerbahçe | 2–0 | Beşiktaş | Istanbul |
| 20:00 EEST | Şen 3'; Nani 82' | Report | | Stadium: Şükrü Saracoğlu Stadium; Attendance: 43,182; Referee: Cüneyt Çakır |

| 6 March 2016 24 | Akhisar Belediyespor | 0–3 | Fenerbahçe | Manisa |
| 19:00 EEST | | Report | Özbayraklı 35'; Şen 51'; Fernandão 90' | Stadium: Manisa 19 Mayıs Stadium; Attendance: 6,665; Referee: Hüseyin Göçek |

| 13 March 2016 25 | Fenerbahçe | 1–0 | Kayserispor | Istanbul |
| 19:00 EEST | Van Persie 53' | Report | | Stadium: Şükrü Saracoğlu Stadium; Attendance: 26,765; Referee: Fırat Aydınus |

| 13 April 2016 26 | Galatasaray | 0–0 | Fenerbahçe | Istanbul |
| 19:30 EEST | | Report | | Stadium: Türk Telekom Arena; Attendance: 37,748; Referee: Mete Kalkavan |

| 3 April 2016 27 | Fenerbahçe | 0–0 | Osmanlıspor | Istanbul |
| 19:00 EEST | | Report | | Stadium: Şükrü Saracoğlu Stadium; Attendance: 27,803; Referee: Ali Palabıyık |

| 9 April 2016 28 | Konyaspor | 2–1 | Fenerbahçe | Konya |
| 20:00 EEST | Rangelov 2'; Çamdalı 85' | Report | Fernandão 41' | Stadium: Torku Arena; Attendance: 32,863; Referee: Cüneyt Çakır |

| 17 April 2016 29 | Fenerbahçe | 4–1 | Mersin İdmanyurdu | Istanbul |
| 19:00 EEST | Şen 7', 9'; Fernandão 57'; Van Persie 63' (pen.) | Report | Varol 45' | Stadium: Şükrü Saracoğlu Stadium; Attendance: 19,561; Referee: Serkan Çınar |

| 24 April 2016 30 | Trabzonspor | 0–4 | Fenerbahçe | Trabzon |
| 20:00 EEST | | Report | Potuk 23'; Şen 27'; Nani 57'; Van Persie 62' | Stadium: Hüseyin Avni Aker Stadium; Attendance: 18,120; Referee: Bülent Yıldırım |

| 1 May 2016 31 | Fenerbahçe | 3–0 | Gaziantepspor | Istanbul |
| 19:00 EEST | Kjær 27'; Van Persie 48', 81' | Report | | Stadium: Şükrü Saracoğlu Stadium; Attendance: 26,059; Referee: Mete Kalkavan |

| 9 May 2016 32 | İstanbul Başakşehir | 2–1 | Fenerbahçe | Istanbul |
| 20:00 EEST | Višća 60', 65' | Report | Topal 80' | Stadium: Başakşehir Arena; Attendance: 6,364; Referee: Fırat Aydınus |

| 15 May 2016 33 | Fenerbahçe | 2–1 | Gençlerbirliği | Istanbul |
| 19:00 EEST | Van Persie 38', 75' | Report | Gürler 61' | Stadium: Şükrü Saracoğlu Stadium; Attendance: 6,339; Referee: Alper Ulusoy |

| 19 May 2016 34 | Sivasspor | 2–2 | Fenerbahçe | Sivas |
| 20:00 EEST | Chahechouhe 14'; Oumari 23' | Report | Ba 45'; Meireles 67' | Stadium: Sivas 4 Eylül Stadium; Attendance: 7,162; Referee: Cüneyt Çakır |

Win Draw Loss Postponed

== Turkish Cup ==
=== Group stage ===
| Pos | Team | Pld | W | D | L | GF | GA | GD | Pts |
|---|---|---|---|---|---|---|---|---|---|
| 1 | Fenerbahçe | 6 | 5 | 1 | 0 | 15 | 4 | +11 | 16 |
| 2 | Antalyaspor | 6 | 3 | 2 | 1 | 7 | 6 | +1 | 11 |
| 3 | Tuzlaspor | 6 | 2 | 1 | 3 | 5 | 5 | 0 | 7 |
| 4 | Giresunspor | 6 | 0 | 0 | 6 | 2 | 14 | −12 | 0 |

| 16 December 2015 1 | Tuzlaspor | 1–2 | Fenerbahçe | Tuzla, Istanbul |
| 14:00 EEST | Salmaz 52' | Report | Subaşı 40'; Civelek 47' | Stadium: Tuzla Town Stadium; Attendance: 2,000; Referee: Murat Özcan |

| 23 December 2015 2 | Fenerbahçe | 4–2 | Antalyaspor | Istanbul |
| 18:45 EEST | Nani 14'; Özbayraklı 31'; Van Persie 49', 59' | Report | Akbaba 73'; Etame 90' | Stadium: Şükrü Saracoğlu Stadium; Attendance: 9,500; Referee: Halil Umut Meler |

| 10 January 2016 3 | Giresunspor | 0–2 | Fenerbahçe | Giresun |
| 20:45 EEST | | Report | Souza 21'; Fernandão 89' | Stadium: Giresun Atatürk Stadium; Attendance: 5,500; Referee: Yaşar Kemal Uğurlu |

| 13 January 2016 4 | Fenerbahçe | 6–1 | Giresunspor | Istanbul |
| 19:00 EEST | Zeybek 17'; Civelek 39'; Erkin 55'; Van Persie 59', 82'; Fernandão 68' | Report | Solmaz 77' | Stadium: Şükrü Saracoğlu Stadium; Attendance: 4,000; Referee: Onur Karabaş |

| 21 January 2016 5 | Fenerbahçe | 1–0 | Tuzlaspor | Istanbul |
| 20:45 EEST | Marković 90' | Report | | Stadium: Şükrü Saracoğlu Stadium; Attendance: 3,000; Referee: Çağatay Şahan |

| 27 January 2016 6 | Antalyaspor | 0–0 | Fenerbahçe | Antalya |
| 20:45 EEST | | Report | | Stadium: New Antalya Stadium; Attendance: 10,000; Referee: Emre Altun |

=== Round of 16 ===
| 30 January 2016 Round of 16 | Fenerbahçe | 1–0 (a.e.t.) | Kayserispor | Istanbul |
| 20:45 EEST | Diego 113' | Report | | Stadium: Şükrü Saracoğlu Stadium; Attendance: 12,121; Referee: Serkan Çınar |

=== Quarter-finals ===
| 9 February 2016 First leg | Amed | 3–3 | Fenerbahçe | Diyarbakır |
| 13:00 EEST | Özer 10'; Ferdi 68'; Yusuf 70' | Report | Civelek 14'; Fernandão 44'; Şen 76' | Stadium: Seyrantepe DİSKİ Sport Facility; Attendance: 0 Referee: İlker Meral |

| 3 March 2016 Second leg | Fenerbahçe | 3–1 (6–4 agg.) | Amed | Istanbul |
| 18:15 EEST | Topuz 31'; Fernandão 40'; Nani 88' | Report | Kamil 77' | Stadium: Ülker Stadium; Attendance: 3,000; Referee: Hakan Ceylan |

Notes

1. Amed Sportif Faaliyetler - Fenerbahçe game was played behind closed doors.

=== Semi-finals ===
| 20 April 2016 First leg | Konyaspor | 0–3 | Fenerbahçe | Konya |
| 21:15 EEST | | Report | Şen 38'; Nani 45'; Van Persie 90' | Stadium: Torku Arena; Attendance: 31,000; Referee: Tolga Özkalfa |

| 5 May 2016 Second leg | Fenerbahçe | 2–0 (5–0 agg.) | Konyaspor | Istanbul |
| 19:15 EEST | Fernandão 47', 71' (pen.) | Report | | Stadium: Ülker Stadium; Attendance: 6,000; Referee: Halil Umut Meler |

=== Final ===
| 26 May 2016 Final | Galatasaray | 1–0 | Fenerbahçe | Antalya |
| 21:15 EEST | Podolski 30' | Report | | Stadium: New Antalya Stadium; Attendance: 32,000; Referee: Mete Kalkavan |

== UEFA Champions League ==
=== Third qualifying round ===
| 28 July 2015 First leg | Fenerbahçe (Turkey) | 0–0 | (Ukraine) Shakhtar Donetsk | Istanbul |
| 20:00 | | Report | | Stadium: Şükrü Saraçoğlu Stadium; Attendance: 37,342; Referee: Jorge Sousa (Portugal) |

| 5 August 2015 Second leg | Shakhtar Donetsk (Ukraine) | 3–0 (3–0 agg.) | (Turkey) Fenerbahçe | Lviv, Ukraine |
| 20:45 | Hladkyy 25'; Srna 65' (pen.); Teixeira 68' | Report | | Stadium: Arena Lviv; Attendance: 33,179; Referee: Felix Zwayer (Germany) |

Notes

1. Shakhtar Donetsk will play their home matches at Arena Lviv, Lviv instead of their regular stadium, Donbas Arena, Donetsk, due to the War in Donbas.

== UEFA Europa League ==
=== Play-off round ===
| 20 August 2015 First leg | Atromitos (Greece) | 0–1 | (Turkey) Fenerbahçe | Athens, Greece |
| 20:00 | | Report | Van Persie 90' | Stadium: Peristeri Stadium; Attendance: 3,328; Referee: Daniele Orsato (Italy) |

| 27 August 2015 Second leg | Fenerbahçe (Turkey) | 3–0 (4–0 agg.) | (Greece) Atromitos | Istanbul |
| 20:00 | Fernandão 7', 78'; Gorbunov 59' (o.g.) | Report | | Stadium: Şükrü Saraçoğlu Stadium; Attendance: 35,000; Referee: Ivan Bebek (Croatia) |

=== Group stage ===
| Pos | Team | Pld | W | D | L | GF | GA | GD | Pts | Qualification | MOL | FEN | AJX | CEL |
|---|---|---|---|---|---|---|---|---|---|---|---|---|---|---|
| 1 | (Norway) Molde | 6 | 3 | 2 | 1 | 10 | 7 | +3 | 11 | Advance to knockout phase | — | 0–2 | 1–1 | 3–1 |
| 2 | (Turkey) Fenerbahçe | 6 | 2 | 3 | 1 | 7 | 6 | +1 | 9 | Advance to knockout phase | 1–3 | — | 1–0 | 1–1 |
| 3 | (Netherlands) Ajax | 6 | 1 | 4 | 1 | 6 | 6 | 0 | 7 | | 1–1 | 0–0 | — | 2–2 |
| 4 | (Scotland) Celtic | 6 | 0 | 3 | 3 | 8 | 12 | −4 | 3 | | 1–2 | 2–2 | 1–2 | — |

Source: Soccerway

| 17 September 2015 1 | Fenerbahçe (Turkey) | 1–3 | (Norway) Molde | Istanbul |
| 19:00 | Nani 42' | Report | Høiland 36' (pen.); Elyounoussi 53'; Linnes 65' | Stadium: Şükrü Saraçoğlu Stadium; Attendance: 31,209; Referee: Benoît Bastien (France) |

| 1 October 2015 2 | Celtic (Scotland) | 2–2 | (Turkey) Fenerbahçe | Glasgow, Scotland |
| 21:05 | Griffiths 28'; Commons 32' | Report | Fernandão 43', 48' | Stadium: Celtic Park; Attendance: 41,330; Referee: Kenn Hansen (Denmark) |

| 22 October 2015 3 | Fenerbahçe (Turkey) | 1–0 | (Netherlands) Ajax | Istanbul |
| 21:05 | Fernandão 89' | Report | | Stadium: Şükrü Saraçoğlu Stadium; Attendance: 35,292; Referee: David Fernández Borbalán (Spain) |

| 5 November 2015 4 | Ajax (Netherlands) | 0–0 | (Turkey) Fenerbahçe | Amsterdam, Netherlands |
| 19:00 | | Report | | Stadium: Amsterdam Arena; Attendance: 48,990; Referee: Liran Liany (Israel) |

| 26 November 2015 5 | Molde (Norway) | 0–2 | (Turkey) Fenerbahçe | Molde, Norway |
| 21:05 | | Report | Fernandão 68'; Tufan 84' | Stadium: Aker Stadion; Attendance: 8,235; Referee: Miroslav Zelinka (Czech Republic) |

| 10 December 2015 6 | Fenerbahçe (Turkey) | 1–1 | (Scotland) Celtic | Istanbul |
| 19:00 | Marković 39' | Report | Commons 75' | Stadium: Şükrü Saraçoğlu Stadium; Attendance: 35,372; Referee: Serge Gumienny (Belgium) |

=== Round of 32 ===
| 16 February 2016 First leg | Fenerbahçe (Turkey) | 2–0 | (Russia) Lokomotiv Moscow | Istanbul |
| 18:00 | Souza 18', 72' | Report | | Stadium: Şükrü Saraçoğlu Stadium; Attendance: 36,195; Referee: Martin Strömbergsson (Sweden) |

| 25 February 2016 Second leg | Lokomotiv Moscow (Russia) | 1–1 (1–3 agg.) | (Turkey) Fenerbahçe | Moscow, Russia |
| 17:00 | Samedov 45' | Report | Topal 83' | Stadium: Lokomotiv Stadium; Attendance: 15,695; Referee: Ivan Kružliak (Slovakia) |

=== Round of 16 ===
| 10 March 2016 First leg | Fenerbahçe (Turkey) | 1–0 | (Portugal) Braga | Istanbul |
| 19:00 | Topal 82' | Report | | Stadium: Şükrü Saracoğlu Stadium; Attendance: 40,197; Referee: Clément Turpin (France) |

| 17 March 2016 Second leg | Braga (Portugal) | 4–1 (4–2 agg.) | (Turkey) Fenerbahçe | Braga, Portugal |
| 21:05 | Hassan 11'; Josué 69' (pen.); Stojiljković 74'; Silva 83' | Report | Potuk 45+3' | Stadium: Estádio Municipal; Attendance: 16,431; Referee: Ivan Bebek (Croatia) |

== See also ==
- 2015–16 Süper Lig
- 2015–16 Türkiye Kupası
- 2015–16 UEFA Champions League
- 2015–16 UEFA Europa League
