= Caner Erkin =

Turkish footballer (born 1988)

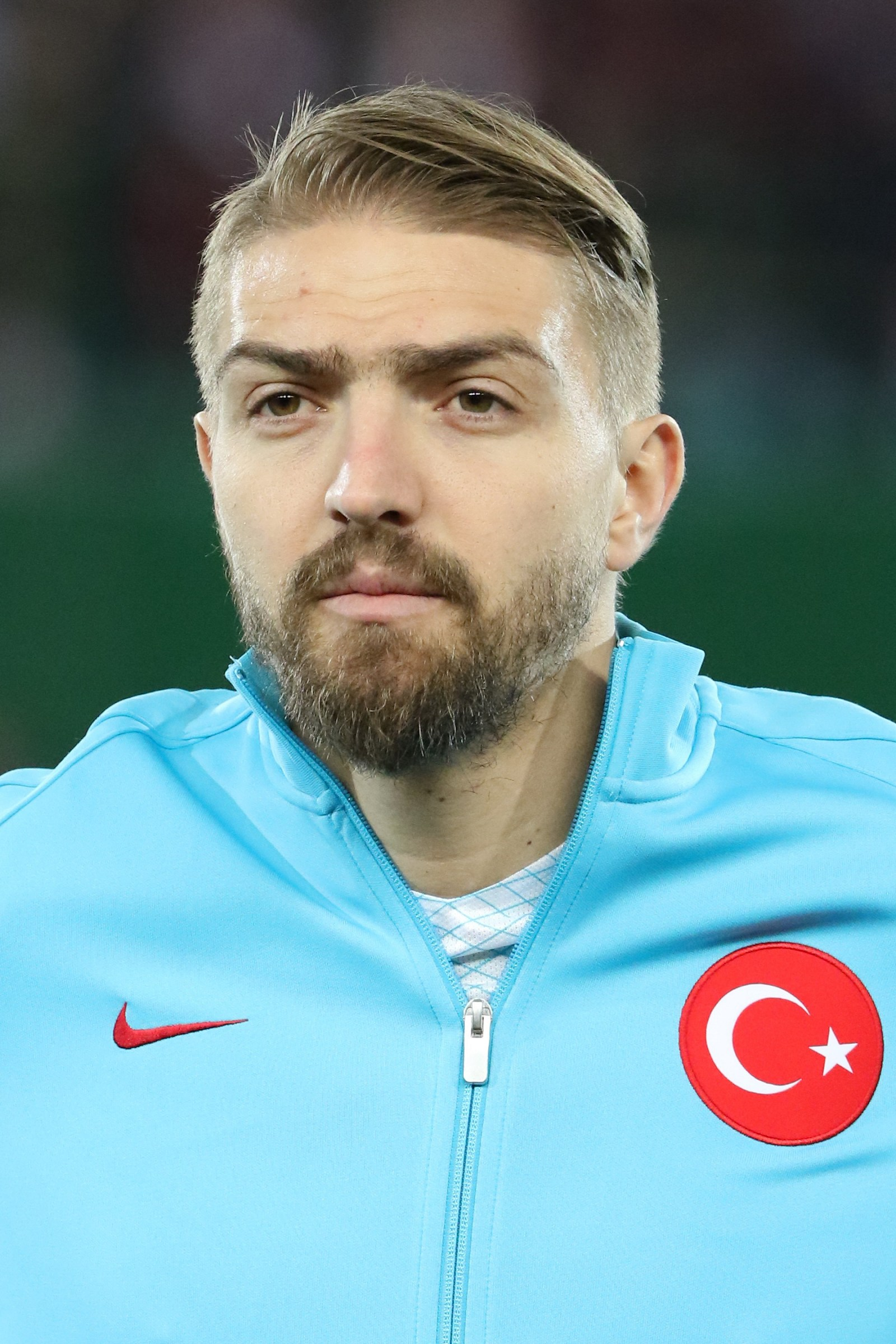
- Erkin with Turkey in 2016

Personal information
- Date of birth: 4 October 1988 (age 38)
- Place of birth: Balıkesir, Turkey
- Height: 1.81 m (5 ft 11 in)
- Position: Left-back

Youth career
- 2002–2004: Manisaspor

Senior career*
Years	Team	Apps	(Gls)
2004–2007	Manisaspor	43	(4)
2007–2010	CSKA Moscow	36	(2)
2009–2010	→ Galatasaray (loan)	29	(4)
2010–2016	Fenerbahçe	157	(9)
2016–2017	Inter Milan	0	(0)
2016–2017	→ Beşiktaş (loan)	8	(0)
2017–2020	Beşiktaş	79	(4)
2020–2021	Fenerbahçe	34	(0)
2021–2023	Fatih Karagümrük	41	(1)
2023	İstanbul Başakşehir	6	(0)
2023–2025	Eyüpspor	52	(8)
2025–2026	Sakaryaspor	12	(0)

International career
2004–2005	Turkey U17	19	(8)
2005	Turkey U18	3	(0)
2005–2006	Turkey U19	7	(4)
2006–2012	Turkey U21	14	(1)
2006–2021	Turkey	63	(2)
- * Club domestic league appearances and goals

Caner Erkin (Turkish pronunciation: [dʒaneɾ æɾˈcin], born 4 October 1988) is a Turkish professional former footballer.

== Club career ==
=== Early years ===
Erkin began his professional career at the start of the 2004–05 season with Manisaspor who at the time were playing in the Second Division. That season they won the league and got promoted to the Süper Lig. During his 1.5-year stay at Manisaspor in, he scored 5 goals in 39 games. In the January 2007 transfer window, he moved to CSKA Moscow, for a £3.5 million transfer fee. He has played a total of 40 games, 7 in the UEFA Champions League and also won the Russian Super Cup on two occasions. On 31 August 2009, Galatasaray signed Erkin on a one-year loan from CSKA Moscow with an option to purchase at the end of the season.

=== Fenerbahçe ===
Erkin signed for Fenerbahçe in 2010. Starting out as a left winger, he was slowly transformed into a left-back. His performances with led to him being scouted by several prominent European clubs.

In 2014, he signed a new two-year contract.

=== Inter Milan ===
On 1 June 2016, Inter Milan announced the signing of Erkin, on a free transfer in a three-year deal starting on 1 July. Erkin was the first summer transfer addition to the squad. Under Roberto Mancini and new coach Frank de Boer, Erkin made seven appearances in pre-season friendlies. However, he did not make any competitive debut before leaving Inter on 30 August. Inter also ran out of players quota in 2016–17 UEFA Europa League, as the club was forced to reduce to 22-men squad (plus normal minimum requirement of homegrown and club-trained players) due to penalty of UEFA Financial Fair Play Regulations, thus Caner was sacrificed for other signings. Domestically, Inter had one quota left (plus another for an Inter-trained player), but left vacant.

==== Loan to Beşiktaş ====
On 30 August 2016, Inter Milan announced that Erkin signed a one-year loan deal with Turkish club Beşiktaş.

=== Beşiktaş ===
On 7 June 2017, Beşiktaş signed Erkin for €750,000 transfer fee. On 23 August 2019, Erkin scored the second goal of 2019–20 Süper Lig Week 2 home encounter, from a cross of his gone in the net, against Göztepe S.K. which ended 3–0 in favour of Beşiktaş. He was released at the end of the 2019–20 Süper Lig season.

=== Return to Fenerbahçe ===
On 6 August 2020, he signed a two-year deal until June 2022 with an option for an extra year. After four years at Beşiktaş, the other side of Istanbul, he returned to Fenerbahçe. On 11 September, in his first game back against Çaykur Rizespor, he assisted Gökhan Gönül's header, who was a returnee like himself.

On 4 August 2021, Fenerbahçe announced that he would not be included in the club's squad for the upcoming season according to the team's manager Vitor Pereira's decision.

=== Fatih Karagümrük ===
On 6 September 2021, Fatih Karagümrük announced the signing of Erkin, as a free agent.

=== İstanbul Başakşehir ===
On 28 January 2023, Erkin signed a 1.5-year contract with İstanbul Başakşehir.

=== Eyüpspor ===
On 11 July 2023, Erkin joined Turkish Second Division side Eyüpspor, as a free agent.

=== Sakaryaspor ===
On 7 July 2025, Erkin joined Turkish Second Division side Sakaryaspor, as a free agent.

== International career ==
In 2005, at the U-17 World Cup, Caner was a vital part of the Turkey team which finished in fourth place. Caner scored 4 goals in the tournament.

Erkin made his debut for the Turkey national football team at the age of 17 in a friendly match against Ghana in May 2006. His first goal was against Ukraine on 5 June 2012.

== Career statistics ==
=== Club ===
As of match played 25 September 2023

Appearances and goals by club, season and competition
Club	Season	League			Cup (Note: Includes Turkish Cup, Turkish Super Cup, Russian Cup, Russian Super Cup)		Europe (Note: Includes UEFA Champions League, UEFA Europa League)		Total	
Club	Season	Division	Apps	Goals	Apps	Goals	Apps	Goals	Apps	Goals
Manisaspor	2004–05	TFF First League	4	0	0	0	—		4	0
Manisaspor	2005–06	Süper Lig	24	2	0	0	—		24	2
Manisaspor	2006–07	Süper Lig	15	2	2	0	—		17	2
Manisaspor	Total		43	4	2	0	0	0	45	4
CSKA Moscow	2007	Russian Premier League	8	1	4	0	2	0	14	1
CSKA Moscow	2008	Russian Premier League	18	1	3	1	2	0	23	2
CSKA Moscow	2009	Russian Premier League	7	0	1	0	3	0	11	0
CSKA Moscow	Total		33	2	8	1	7	0	48	3
Galatasaray (loan)	2009–10	Süper Lig	20	0	6	3	4	0	30	3
Fenerbahçe	2010–11	Süper Lig	22	1	3	0	1	0	26	1
Fenerbahçe	2011–12	Süper Lig	31	2	5	1	—		36	3
Fenerbahçe	2012–13	Süper Lig	30	0	7	1	16	3	53	4
Fenerbahçe	2013–14	Süper Lig	30	3	1	0	2	0	33	3
Fenerbahçe	2014–15	Süper Lig	31	3	5	1	—		36	4
Fenerbahçe	2015–16	Süper Lig	13	0	4	1	10	0	27	1
Fenerbahçe	Total		157	9	25	4	29	3	211	16
Inter Milan	2016–17	Serie A	0	0	0	0	0	0	0	0
Beşiktaş (loan)	2016–17	Süper Lig	8	0	0	0	3	0	11	0
Beşiktaş	2017–18	Süper Lig	21	0	5	0	5	0	31	0
Beşiktaş	2018–19	Süper Lig	28	1	0	0	11	1	39	2
Beşiktaş	2019–20	Süper Lig	30	3	3	1	4	0	37	4
Beşiktaş	Total		87	4	8	1	23	1	118	6
Fenerbahçe	2020–21	Süper Lig	34	0	3	0	0	0	37	0
Fatih Karagümrük	2021–22	Süper Lig	29	1	2	0	—		31	1
Fatih Karagümrük	2022–23	Süper Lig	12	0	0	0	—		12	0
Fatih Karagümrük	Total		31	1	2	0	0	0	33	1
İstanbul Başakşehir	2022–23	Süper Lig	7	0	3	0	—		10	0
Eyüpspor	2023–24	TFF First League	26	8	0	0	—		26	8
Career total			438	28	57	9	63	4	558	41

=== International ===
As of match played 16 November 2021

Appearances and goals by national team and year
National team	Year	Apps	Goals
Turkey	2006	2	0
Turkey	2008	1	0
Turkey	2009	3	0
Turkey	2010	2	0
Turkey	2011	1	0
Turkey	2012	9	1
Turkey	2013	8	0
Turkey	2014	12	1
Turkey	2015	6	0
Turkey	2016	9	0
Turkey	2017	2	0
Turkey	2020	3	0
Turkey	2021	7	0
Total		63	2

As of 24 August 2019
Scores and results list Turkey's goal tally first, score column indicates score after each Erkin goal.

List of international goals scored by Caner Erkin
No.	Date	Venue	Opponent	Score	Result	Competition
1	5 June 2012	Audi Sportpark, Ingolstadt, Germany	Ukraine	1–0	2–0	Friendly
2	29 May 2014	Robert F. Kennedy Memorial Stadium, Washington, D.C., United States	Honduras	2–0	2–0	Friendly

== Honours ==
Fenerbahçe

- Süper Lig: 2010-11, 2013–14
- Turkish Cup: 2011–12, 2012–13
- Turkish Super Cup: 2014

CSKA Moscow

- Russian Cup: 2007–08, 2008–09

Beşiktaş

- Süper Lig: 2016–17
