= Alper Potuk =

Turkish footballer

Personal information
- Full name: Alper Potuk
- Date of birth: 8 April 1991 (age 35)
- Place of birth: Bolvadin, Turkey
- Height: 1.77 m (5 ft 10 in)
- Positions: Midfielder; winger

Youth career
- 2002–2005: Çifteler
- 2005–2009: Eskişehirspor

Senior career*
Years	Team	Apps	(Gls)
2009–2013	Eskişehirspor	106	(5)
2013–2020	Fenerbahçe	152	(12)
2020–2021	Ankaragücü	24	(2)
2021–2023	Çaykur Rizespor	52	(1)
2023–2025	Gostivar	48	(11)
2025	Keçiörengücü	4	(0)
2026	Bodrumspor	7	(0)

International career^{‡}
2010	Turkey U19	4	(1)
2010	Turkey U20	1	(0)
2010–2012	Turkey U21	11	(1)
2012	Turkey A2	2	(0)
2012–2018	Turkey	17	(1)
- * Club domestic league appearances and goals as of 5 May 2026 ‡ National team caps and goals as of 23 March 2018

Alper Potuk (born 8 April 1991) is a Turkish footballer who plays as a midfielder or winger.

== Early life ==
Potuk was born in Bolvadin, Afyonkarahisar Province, on 8 April 1991. He began playing football with friends in the street, receiving a strong backing from his family, especially his father and brother; his brother would give him a ride to watch Afyonkarahisarspor training sessions. Potuk's family relocated to Eskişehir because of his father's job.

== Career ==
=== Eskişehirspor ===
Çiftelerspor signed the youngster in 2002, and he competed in their youth teams for three years. In a match against Eskişehirspor, Potuk scored his team's lone goal in a 1–4 loss, impressing the Eskişehirspor coaches. Potuk started his career in the city of Eskişehir, joining Çiftelerspor in 2002, before moving on to Eskişehirspor in 2005. He made his professional debut on 29 May 2009 against Gaziantepspor. In the second qualifying round of the 2012–13 UEFA Europa League, he scored the first goal in a 2–0 win against Scottish Premier League side St Johnstone.

=== Fenerbahçe ===
On 22 May 2013, Alper completed a move to Fenerbahçe in five-year contract. The transfer involved Henri Bienvenu moving in the opposite direction, to Eskişehirspor, while Fenerbahçe also paid €6.25 million. According to the reports, a journalist interviewed with Alper in National Team Camp and He talked about his transfer rumor. He promised to Fenerbahçe for transfer. "Before the negotiate contract Fenerbahçe's Boss Aziz Yıldırım called me and they wanted to see me at Fenerbahçe. Also they will transfer great names and Fenerbahçe's squad will be more greater" said Alper. In addition to his conversation he said he is a fan of Fenerbahçe and if Fenerbahçe's managers will deal with Eskişehirspor, he will sign to Fenerbahçe. Then transfer completed after that. He said "I promised only Fenerbahçe. So I dealt with Fenerbahçe 15 days ago." On 31 August 2013, he scored his debut goal for the club in a Süper Lig match against Sivasspor.

== International career ==
Potuk represented his country's U19, U20, and U21 teams. He played his first match for Turkey in a friendly game against Slovakia at Bursa Atatürk Stadium on 29 February 2012. He subsequently represented Turkey in 2014 World Cup qualifying, playing his first qualifier against Andorra on 22 March 2013.

== Career statistics ==
=== Club ===
As of match played 21 April 2024

Club	Season	League			Turkish Cup		Europe		Other		Total	
Club	Season	Division	Apps	Goals	Apps	Goals	Apps	Goals	Apps	Goals	Apps	Goals
Eskişehirspor	2008–09	Süper Lig	1	0	0	0	—		—		1	0
Eskişehirspor	2009–10	Süper Lig	16	0	3	0	—		—		19	0
Eskişehirspor	2010–11	Süper Lig	24	0	1	0	—		—		25	0
Eskişehirspor	2011–12	Süper Lig	35	2	3	0	—		—		38	2
Eskişehirspor	2012–13	Süper Lig	30	3	9	0	4 (Note: Appearances in UEFA Europa League)	1	—		43	4
Eskişehirspor	Total		106	5	16	0	4	1	—		126	6
Fenerbahçe	2013–14	Süper Lig	28	1	1	0	4 (Note: Appearances in UEFA Champions League)	0	1 (Note: Appearance in Turkish Super Cup)	0	34	1
Fenerbahçe	2014–15	Süper Lig	30	3	5	0	—		1	0	36	3
Fenerbahçe	2015–16	Süper Lig	27	4	7	0	11 (Note: One appearance in UEFA Champions League, ten appearances and one goal in UEFA Europa League)	1	—		45	5
Fenerbahçe	2016–17	Süper Lig	29	1	5	0	9	0	—		43	1
Fenerbahçe	2017–18	Süper Lig	25	3	5	3	4	0	—		34	6
Fenerbahçe	2018–19	Süper Lig	8	0	0	0	6 (Note: Two appearances and one goal in UEFA Champions League, four appearances in UEFA Europa League)	1	—		14	1
Fenerbahçe	2019–20	Süper Lig	5	0	3	0	—		—		8	0
Fenerbahçe	Total		152	12	26	3	34	2	2	0	214	17
Ankaragücü	2020–21	Süper Lig	24	2	1	0	—		—		25	2
Çaykur Rizespor	2021–22	Süper Lig	22	0	1	0	—		—		23	0
Çaykur Rizespor	2022–23	TFF First League	30	1	1	0	—		—		31	1
Çaykur Rizespor	Total		52	1	2	0	—		—		54	1
KF Gostivar	2023–24	Macedonian First League	25	7	0	0	—		—		25	7
Career total			359	27	45	3	38	3	2	0	444	33

=== International ===
As of match played 28 March 2018

Turkey
Year	Apps	Goals
2012	2	0
2013	6	0
2014	4	1
2015	2	0
2016	2	0
2017	0	0
2018	1	0
Total	17	1

Scores and results table. Turkey's goal tally first:

International goals
#	Date	Venue	Opponent	Score	Result	Competition
1.	21 May 2014	Olympic Stadium Adem Jashari, Mitrovica, Kosovo	Kosovo	6–1	6–1	Friendly

== Honours ==
Fenerbahçe

- Süper Lig: 2013–14
- Turkish Super Cup: 2014
