= Caner Koca =

Turkish footballer (born 1996)

Personal information
- Date of birth: 14 April 1996 (age 30)
- Place of birth: Kocaeli, Turkey
- Height: 1.83 m (6 ft 0 in)
- Position: Defensive midfielder

Team information
- Current team: Isparta 32 SK
- Number: 6

Youth career
- Fenerbahçe

Senior career*
Years	Team	Apps	(Gls)
2014–2019	Fenerbahçe A2	71	(11)
2015–2019	Fenerbahçe	1	(0)
2017	→ Samsunspor (loan)	2	(0)
2017–2018	→ Kırklarelispor (loan)	32	(0)
2018–2019	→ Kırklarelispor (loan)	31	(1)
2019–2020	Kırklarelispor	24	(1)
2020–2021	Sakaryaspor	31	(1)
2021–2022	Şanlıurfaspor	28	(0)
2022–2023	Karacabey Belediyespor	25	(1)
2023–	Isparta 32 SK	6	(0)

International career
2016–2017	Turkey U21	3	(0)
- * Club domestic league appearances and goals as of 1 October 2023

Caner Koca (born 14 April 1996) is a Turkish footballer who plays as a defensive midfielder for TFF Second League club Isparta 32 SK.

== Club career ==
Koca is a youth exponent from Fenerbahçe S.K. He made his Süper Lig debut at 31 May 2015 against Kasımpaşa SK. He replaced Dirk Kuyt in extra time in a 2–0 home win.

== International career ==
Caner debuted for the Turkey U21 team in a 1–0 loss to Germany U21 on 10 November 2016.
