= Muhammed Akarslan =

Turkish footballer

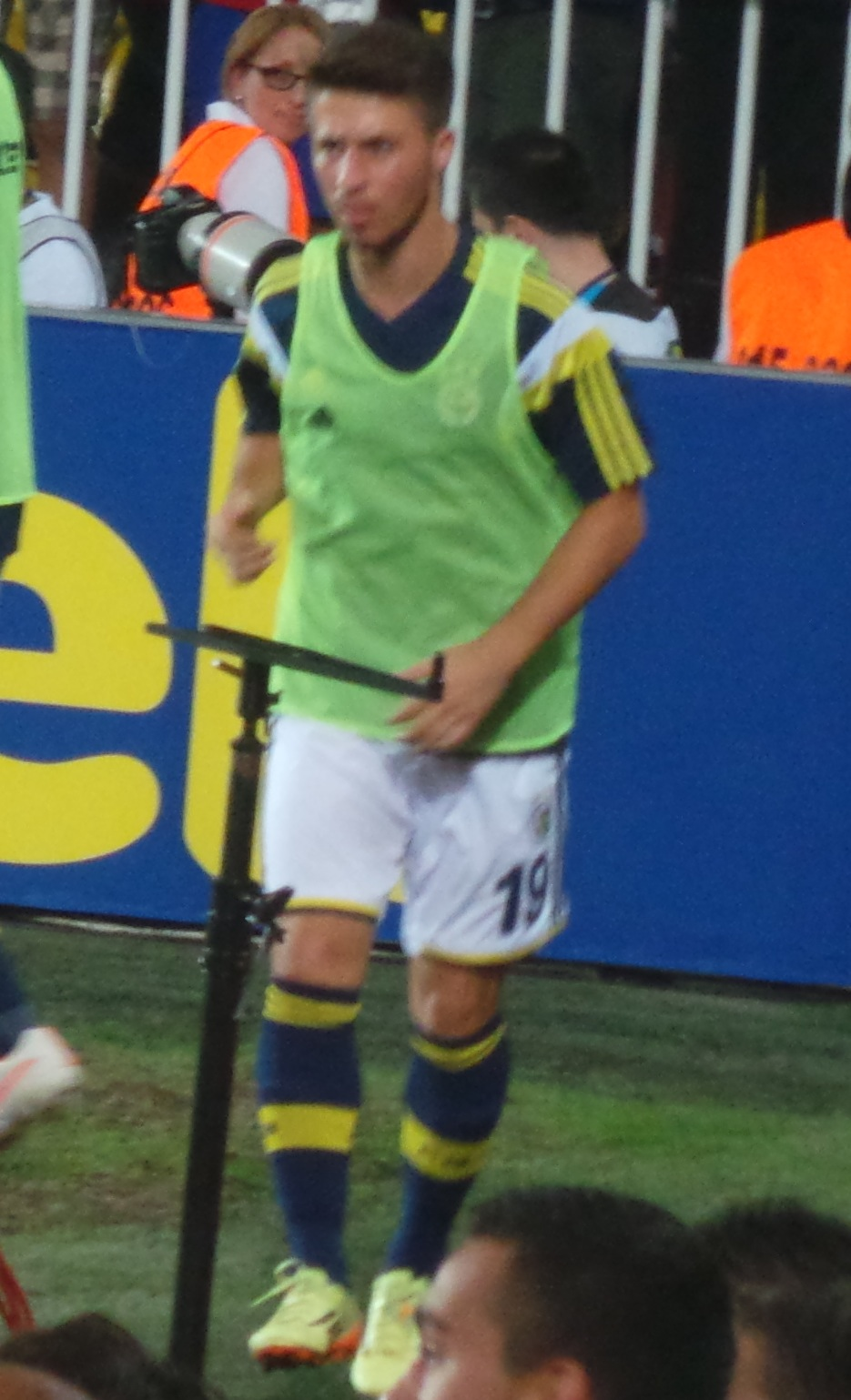

Personal information
- Date of birth: 2 April 1995 (age 31)
- Place of birth: Sincik, Turkey
- Height: 1.74 m (5 ft 9 in)
- Position: Midfielder

Team information
- Current team: Kahramanmaraş İstiklalspor
- Number: 8

Youth career
- 2005–2007: İstanbul Gençlerbirliği
- 2007–2015: Fenerbahçe

Senior career*
Years	Team	Apps	(Gls)
2013–2016	Fenerbahçe A2		
2014	Fenerbahçe	1	(0)
2015	→ Sarıyer (loan)	5	(0)
2016–2017	Fatih Karagümrük	60	(7)
2017	Bodrumspor	17	(0)
2018	Diyarbakırspor	14	(4)
2018–2020	Tuzlaspor	54	(6)
2020–2022	Eyüpspor	43	(12)
2022–2025	Pendikspor	28	(1)
2023	→ Iğdır (loan)	9	(0)
2023	→ Sakaryaspor (loan)	4	(0)
2023–2024	→ Tuzlaspor (loan)	25	(0)
2024–2025	→ Kahramanmaraş İstiklalspor (loan)	15	(2)
2025–	Kahramanmaraş İstiklalspor	25	(5)
- * Club domestic league appearances and goals as of 30 November 2025

Muhammed Akarslan (born 2 April 1995) is a Turkish footballer who plays for TFF 2. Lig club Kahramanmaraş İstiklalspor.

== Career ==
He made his Süper Lig debut on 16 May 2014.
