= Emmanuel Emenike =

Nigerian footballer (born 1987)

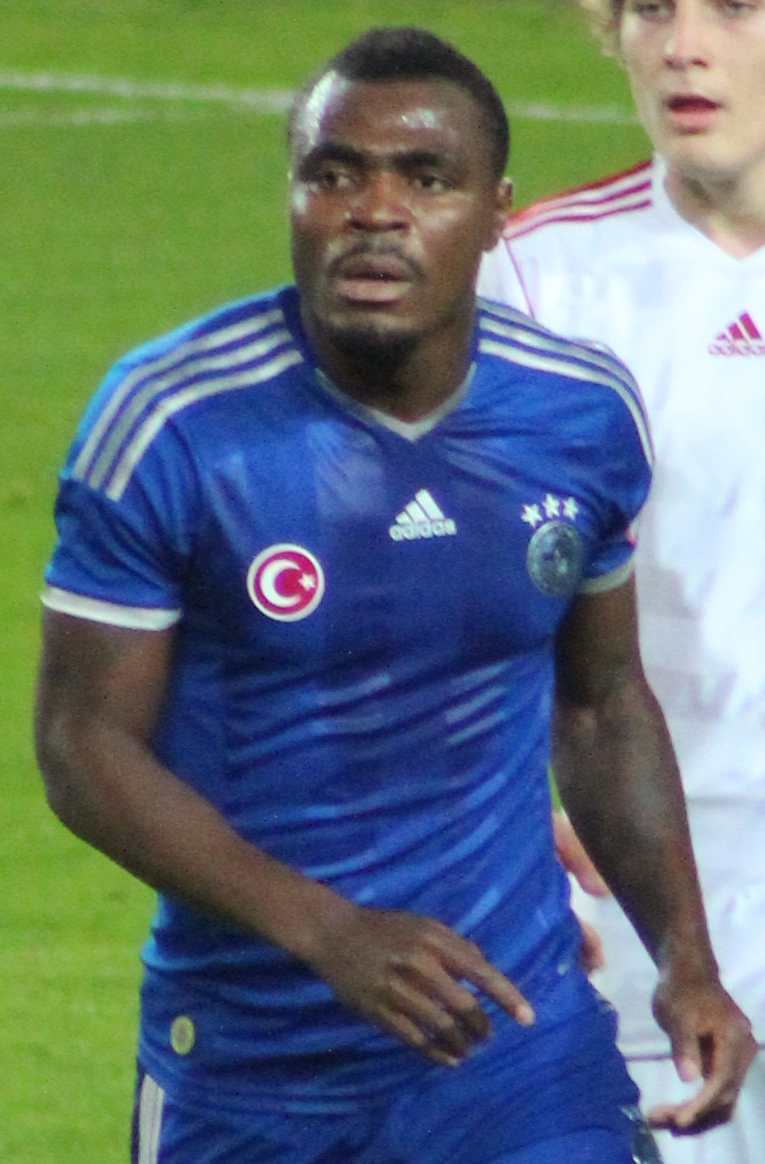
- Emenike with Fenerbahçe in 2014

Personal information
- Full name: Emmanuel Chinenye Emenike
- Date of birth: 10 May 1987 (age 39)
- Place of birth: Otuocha, Aguleri, Nigeria
- Height: 1.82 m (6 ft 0 in)
- Position: Striker

Youth career
- 2007–2008: Delta Force

Senior career*
Years	Team	Apps	(Gls)
2008	Mpumalanga Black Aces	7	(3)
2008–2009	Cape Town	16	(1)
2009–2011	Karabükspor	51	(30)
2011	Fenerbahçe	0	(0)
2011–2013	Spartak Moscow	42	(21)
2013–2017	Fenerbahçe	69	(19)
2015–2016	→ Al Ain (loan)	11	(7)
2016	→ West Ham United (loan)	13	(0)
2017–2018	Olympiacos	5	(0)
2018	→ Las Palmas (loan)	0	(0)
2019	Westerlo	5	(0)
Total		214	(82)

International career
2011–2015	Nigeria	37	(9)
Medal record
Men's football
Representing Nigeria
Africa Cup of Nations
Winner	2013 South Africa
- * Club domestic league appearances and goals

Emmanuel Chinenye Emenike MON (born 10 May 1987) is a Nigerian former professional footballer who played as a striker. He played for clubs including Karabükspor, Spartak Moscow, and Fenerbahçe, most notably winning the Süper Lig title with Fenerbahçe in the 2013–14 season.

Emenike made his debut for the Nigeria national football team in 2011 and helped Nigeria win the 2013 Africa Cup of Nations. He scored four goals during the tournament, finishing as the competition's top scorer, and was also named in the Team of the Tournament.

== Club career ==
=== Delta Force ===
Emenike started his football career with Delta Force. At the club, he experienced many hardships. He walked on foot to training and back, even though it could take an hour and a half. The Delta State government also refused the club funds, so he wasn't paid regularly.

=== Mpumalanga Black Aces ===
Later on his career, he would earn his first salary when he moved to South Africa. He transferred to South African National First Division team Mpumalanga Black Aces in January 2008 and debuted against Dynamos F.C. on 17 February 2008. He scored his first goal with the team in his debut but Black Aces lost the match 4–2. He was a member of the Black Aces team that lost against Mamelodi Sundowns in the Nedbank Cup final.

=== Cape Town ===
In May 2008, he joined First Division team Cape Town.

=== Karabükspor ===
In 2009 Emenike signed a one-year loan deal with Karabükspor. Emenike made his debut in the opening game of the 1.Lig season on 23 August 2009 in a 3–3 draw against Samsunspor. He would score his first goal on 11 October, against Kartal. Emenike would score his first hat-trick of his Turkish career in a 6–1 win over Mersin İdmanyurdu and score another hat-trick on 14 February 2010 in a 4–2 win over Kayseri Erciyesspor. He went on to score 16 goals in the 1.Lig, leading the club to the title and automatic promotion.

Emenike won the 1.Lig Best Foreign Player award at the end of the 2009–10 season, and also had his contract extended by three years for €300.000.

Emenike scored on his Süper Lig debut, helping Karabükspor to a 2–1 victory over Manisaspor. On 28 November 2010, he scored his first hat-trick in Süper Lig career in a 3–0 win over Bucaspor. He subsequently scored a total of 14 goals in his debut Süper Lig season.

In May 2011, he initiated a lawsuit against the newspaper 'Haber Turk' for what Emenike's agents described as a "misleading" and "malicious" claim that Emenike's age was seven years different from what is shown on his passport.

=== Fenerbahçe ===
On 25 May 2011, Emenike joined Fenerbahçe for an undisclosed fee, believed to be around 9 million euros.

=== Spartak Moscow ===
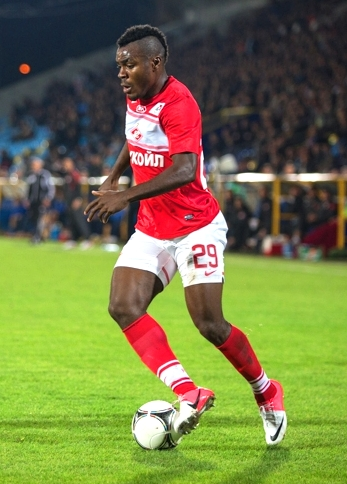
Emenike in a Spartak Moscow shirt, 2012

On 28 July 2011, he was sold to Spartak Moscow for €10 million due to the match fixing claim, which was disproven by the court later on, involving Fenerbahce and Emenike. Emenike had never appeared in a competitive match for Fenerbahçe.

Emenike made his debut on the opening game of the season coming on as a substitute for Ari in the 76th minute, against Anzhi Makhachkala on 14 August 2011. Emenike made his Europa League debut in a 2–2 draw against Polish side Legia Warsaw in the first leg of the qualification round. Emenike scored his first goal for the club with a 2–2 draw against CSKA Moscow. On 29 October 2011, Emenike scored his first hat-trick in a 3–0 win over Lokomotiv Moscow and the next game when Spartak played against Lokomotiv, he would score twice.

Towards the end of season, Emenike was fined about US$17,000 for an offensive gesture after Dynamo Moscow fans, who racially abused him during a match between Spartak and Dynamo, which Spartak won 3–1 and he scored. Vladimir Vasilyev, a Russian FA's ethics committee official, explained the fine, stating it was "an adequate punishment".

In the last game of the season against champions Zenit Saint Petersburg, Emenike scored the second goal in the game but received a red card after he appeared to do a mock vein-tapping in preparation for an imaginary heroin injection. Eventually, Spartak Moscow would win 3–2. After the game, Emenike made an explanation celebration for gratitude to his parents The meeting between House of Football Control and Disciplinary Committee refused to consider the incident and shifted responsibility for the decision by the Ethics Committee.

In the 2011–12 season, Emenike scored 13 goals (all in the league) and is the second top-scorer behind Artyom Dzyuba, who scored one more than Emenike. At the end of the season, Emenike signed a four-year deal and increased his buy-out clause to $42 million.

In 2012–13 season, Emenike scored the fastest goal in the history of the Russian League, within 10 seconds of kick-off in a 2–1 win over Alania Vladikavkaz on the opening game of the season. In the Champions League qualifying round against his former club Fenerbahçe, he scored in a 2–1 first leg win. Eventually, Spartak Moscow would go through to the Group Stage of the Champions League. In Matchday Two of the Group Stage, Emenike scored a brace in a 3–2 loss against Scottish side Celtic. After the match, Nigerian teammate Efe Ambrose spoke to Goal.com praising Emenike for his "electrifying performance" But in the second half of the season, his playing time was reduced, due to injuries. In 2013–14 season, Emenike scored three goals in four matches, to send the club into first place in the league in the first-four matches. When Emenike left Spartak he said that Valeriy Karpin (Spartak coach) was like a father to him.

=== Return to Fenerbahçe ===
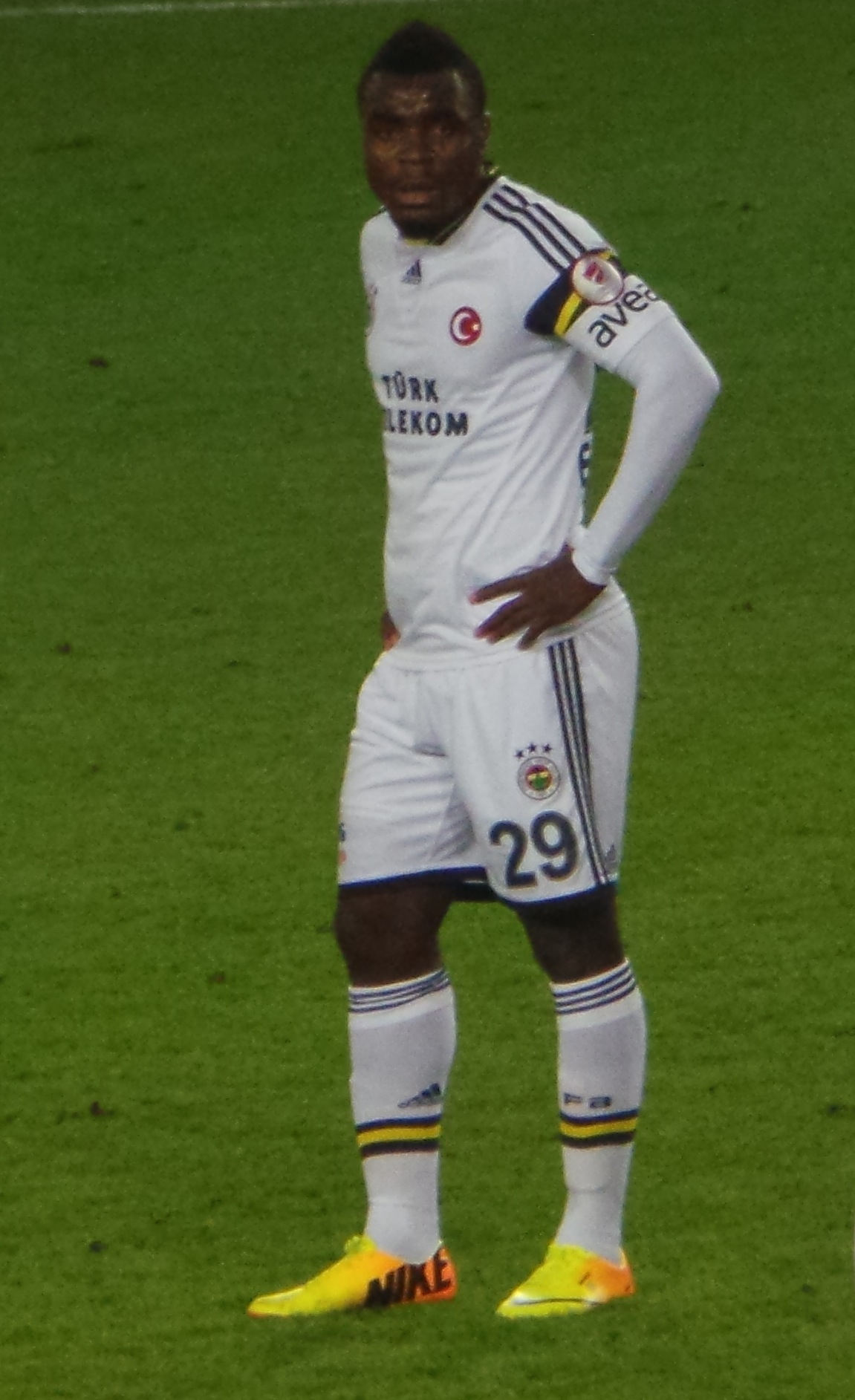
Emenike playing for Fenerbahçe in 2013

In August 2013, Emenike moved back to Turkey by returning to Fenerbahçe for a fee worth around €13 million (£10.2 million). He was noted to be "thrilled" and was quoted saying Fenerbahce had always been a dream for him, and he had returned to perform for the fans and win championships. His first match for Fenerbahçe against Torku Konyaspor ended in a 3–2 loss. He scored his first goal for Fenerbahçe in October 2013 against Kayserispor in the 94th minute, securing a last minute win. He scored two more against Gaziantepspor a week later, while Fenerbahçe won 3–1.

==== Loan to Al Ain ====
On 11 July 2015, Emenike signed for Al Ain on a season-long loan. On 13 January 2016, after spending six months at the club, Emenike returned to Fenerbahçe after his loan move was terminated by the club.

==== Loan to West Ham United ====
On 31 January 2016, Emenike signed for West Ham United on loan until the end of the season with an option to make it permanent. On 6 February, Emenike made his debut as a 73rd-minute substitute replacing Michail Antonio in a 1–0 defeat at Southampton. On 21 February, Emenike scored a brace in a 5–1 win against Blackburn Rovers in the FA Cup, his only goals for the club.

=== Olympiacos ===
On 6 July 2017, Emenike joined Greek champions Olympiacos for a fee of €3.8 million on a two-year deal. On 25 July 2017, Emenike made his first appearance for the club, scoring a last minute goal, helping Olympiacos to a 3–1 victory against FK Partizan, in the 1st leg of the UEFA Champions League third qualifying round. On 19 September 2017, thanks to a brace scored by Emenike at second half, Olympiacos won 2–1 against Asteras Tripolis, at this 2017-18 Greek Cup clash, at Georgios Karaiskakis Stadium.

In November 2017 Emenike was reportedly under orders to train alone even though he was not recovering from any injury and was linked with a move away from Olympiacos with CSKA Moscow mentioned as a possible destination. Emenike had complained of being unsafe at his home in Greece and Olympiacos were forced to hire extra security to protect him.

On 29 December 2017, Emenike thanked Turkish giants Galatasaray for their brave step in reaching out to embattled former Arsenal and Ivorian defender, Emmanuel Eboue, who lost a bitter divorce battle, with his wife Aurelie awarded all of their assets, had to hide from cops and bailiffs after being ordered by a judge to transfer his remaining Enfield home in England to his wife.

On 17 July 2018, he mutually resolved his contract with Olympiacos.

=== Loan to Las Palmas ===
On the last day of the winter transfer window 2018, Emenike agreed to play on loan from Olympiacos to Las Palmas until the end of the season as he had not much playing time in Olympiacos matches. Few days after his signing the Spanish club have announced that Emenike is now being treated for a knee problem and no date was fixed for his return to action. “An MRI scan was conducted the same night which indicated the presence of an osteochondral lesion at the level of the internal femoral condyle and swelling of the internal lateral ligament,” Las Palmas explained.

=== Westerlo ===
On 27 August 2019, Emenike started to trials with Belgian 2nd division outfit Westerlo, for a potential contract. On 16 September 2019, he signed with the club. Westerlo became his 10th professional club. On 14 November 2019, Westerlo released Emenike, following five games played for the club, due to "not bringing the level that both parties had intended" by the pertinent official club statement.

== International career ==
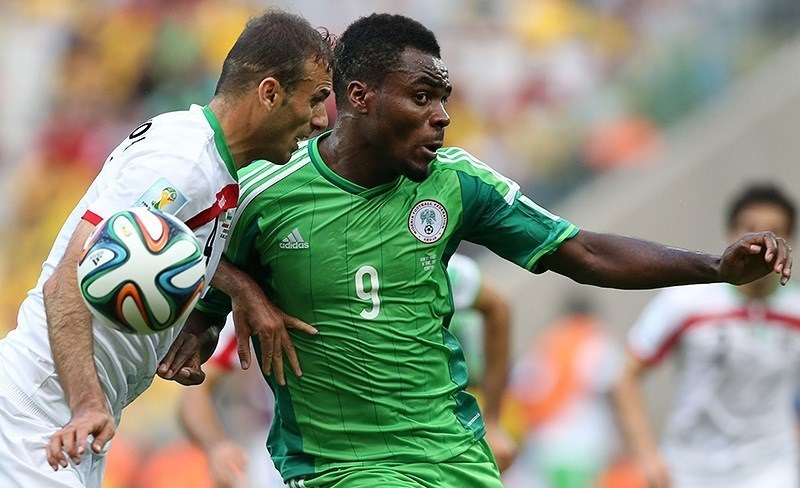
Emenike (right) playing for Nigeria against Iran at the 2014 FIFA World Cup

Emenike was called up to the Nigeria national team for a friendly against Sierra Leone. He was called up to Nigeria's 23-man squad for the Africa Cup of Nations. On 21 January 2013, he scored in Nigeria's opening AFCON match against Burkina Faso in a 1–1 draw. He also scored the first goal in the quarter-final match between Nigeria and Côte d'Ivoire which Nigeria won 2–1. On 3 February, Emenike scored a 30-yard free kick giving his country a 2–1 win over Côte d'Ivoire in the African Cup of Nations.

In 2013, he became part of the third Nigerian team to win the African Cup of Nations – Nigeria's first continental victory since 1994. His four goals proved crucial to Nigeria's progress through the tournament, and he was named to the team of the African Cup of Nations Team of the Tournament. However, Emenike wasn't included in the final, due to a thigh injury. He also received the Pepsi Tournament Top Scorer, with four goals, along with Ghana's Wakaso Mubarak.

In March 2013, Emenike was left out of the Nigerian squad for the World Cup qualifier, due to hamstring injury, which Emenike criticised Nigeria's coach and officials of ignoring him. In June 2013, Emenike wasn't included for Nigeria's squad at the 2013 FIFA Confederations Cup. After four month without being called up, Emenike was called up for August's Mandela Cup friendly match but did not participate due to injury. Emenike celebrated his absence from Eagles in Sept 2013 when he played in the 2014 world cup qualifier against Malawi – played in Calabar. He scored a goal in the two-nil win by the Super Eagles – a win which took them to the final round of world cup qualifiers. He came on as a substitute three days later in a friendly match against Burkina Faso, played in Kaduna – he scored the fourth goal in a 4–1 win for the Eagles.

On 13 October 2013, in the first-leg of last round of the World Cup qualifier against Ethiopia national football team, he scored twice to give the Super Eagles a 2–1 lead going into the second-leg On 20 October 2015 he announced his retirement.

Emenike played as Nigeria's main striker at the 2014 FIFA World Cup. He started in Nigeria's group-stage match against Iran, which ended in a 0–0 draw, and then played the full 90 minutes against Bosnia and Herzegovina, contributing to Nigeria's 1–0 victory.

On 20 October 2015, Emenike announced his retirement from international football.

== Personal life ==
Emenike married former Most Beautiful Girl in Nigeria winner Iheoma Nnadi in 2016. The couple welcomed their first child in August 2017. They had their second child on 13 March 2020. Emenike is the cousin of US international and West Bromwich Albion striker Daryl Dike.

== Career statistics ==
=== Club ===
Appearances and goals by club, season and competition
Club	Season	League			National cup (Note: Includes Russian Cup, Turkish Cup, FA Cup, Greek Cup)		League cup (Note: Includes UAE League Cup)		Continental		Other		Total	
Club	Season	Division	Apps	Goals	Apps	Goals	Apps	Goals	Apps	Goals	Apps	Goals	Apps	Goals
Karabükspor	2009–10	TFF First League	28	16	0	0	—		—		—		28	16
Karabükspor	2010–11	Süper Lig	23	14	0	0	—		—		—		23	14
Karabükspor	Total		51	30	0	0	—		—		—		51	30
Spartak Moscow	2011–12	Russian Premier League	22	13	0	0	—		2 (Note: Appearances in UEFA Europa League)	0	—		24	13
Spartak Moscow	2012–13	Russian Premier League	16	5	1	0	—		6 (Note: Appearances in UEFA Champions League)	3	—		23	8
Spartak Moscow	2013–14	Russian Premier League	4	3	0	0	—		0	0	—		4	3
Spartak Moscow	Total		42	21	1	0	—		8	3	—		51	24
Fenerbahçe	2013–14	Süper Lig	28	12	1	0	—		2	0	0	0	31	12
Fenerbahçe	2014–15	Süper Lig	27	4	7	1	—		0	0	1 (Note: Appearance in Turkish Super Cup)	0	35	5
Fenerbahçe	2016–17	Süper Lig	16	4	1	0	—		10 (Note: Two appearances and three goals in UEFA Champions League, eight appearances and one goal in UEFA Europa League)	4	—		27	8
Fenerbahçe	Total		71	20	9	1	—		12	4	1	0	93	25
Al Ain (loan)	2015–16	UAE Pro League	11	7	0	0	3	0	—		1 (Note: Appearance in UAE Super Cup)	0	15	7
West Ham United (loan)	2015–16	Premier League	13	0	3	2	0	0	—		—		16	2
Olympiacos	2017–18	Super League Greece	5	0	2	3	—		3	1	—		10	4
Las Palmas	2017–18	La Liga	0	0	—		—		—		—		0	0
Westerlo	2019–20	Challenger Pro League	5	0	0	0	—		—		—		5	0
Career total			198	78	15	6	3	0	23	8	2	0	241	92

=== International ===
Scores and results list Nigeria's goal tally first, score column indicates score after each Emenike goal.

List of international goals scored by Emmanuel Emenike
No.	Date	Venue	Opponent	Score	Result	Competition
1	1 June 2011	National Stadium, Abuja, Nigeria	Argentina	4–0	4–1	Friendly
2	21 January 2013	Mbombela Stadium, Nelspruit, South Africa	Burkina Faso	1–0	1–1	2013 Africa Cup of Nations
3	25 January 2013	Mbombela Stadium, Nelspuit, South Africa	Zambia	1–0	1–1	2013 Africa Cup of Nations
4	3 February 2013	Royal Bafokeng Stadium, Phokeng, South Africa	Ivory Coast	1–0	2–1	2013 Africa Cup of Nations
5	6 February 2013	Moses Mabhida Stadium, Durban, South Africa	Mali	3–0	4–1	2013 Africa Cup of Nations
6	7 September 2013	U.J. Esuene Stadium, Calabar, Nigeria	Malawi	1–0	2–0	2014 FIFA World Cup qualification
7	10 September 2013	Ahmadu Bello Stadium, Kaduna, Nigeria	Burkina Faso	4–0	4–1	Friendly
8	13 October 2013	Addis Ababa Stadium, Addis Ababa, Ethiopia	Ethiopia	1–1	2–1	2014 FIFA World Cup qualification
9	13 October 2013	Addis Ababa Stadium, Addis Ababa, Ethiopia	Ethiopia	2–1	2–1	2014 FIFA World Cup qualification

== Honours ==
Karabükspor

- TFF First League: 2009–10

Fenerbahçe

- Süper Lig: 2013–14
- Turkish Super Cup: 2014

Nigeria

- Africa Cup of Nations: 2013

Individual

- Africa Cup of Nations Golden Boot: 2013
- Africa Cup of Nations Team of the Tournament: 2013

Orders

- Member of the Order of the Niger
