= Ramazan Civelek =

Turkish footballer

Personal information
- Date of birth: 22 January 1996 (age 30)
- Place of birth: Istanbul, Turkey
- Height: 1.72 m (5 ft 8 in)
- Positions: Right midfielder; left midfielder

Team information
- Current team: Fatih Karagümrük
- Number: 22

Youth career
- 2005–2007: Çakmakspor
- 2007–2014: Fenerbahçe

Senior career*
Years	Team	Apps	(Gls)
2015–2018	Fenerbahçe	2	(0)
2017	→ Gaziantep BB (loan)	15	(3)
2017–2018	→ Sakaryaspor (loan)	20	(0)
2018–2021	Fatih Karagümrük	77	(9)
2021–2026	Kayserispor	164	(5)
2026–	Fatih Karagümrük	9	(1)

International career
2011	Turkey U15	2	(0)
2011–2012	Turkey U16	7	(0)
2012–2013	Turkey U17	3	(0)
2015–2016	Turkey U19	2	(0)
- * Club domestic league appearances and goals as of 19 October 2026

Ramazan Civelek (born 22 January 1996) is a Turkish footballer who plays for TFF 1. Lig club Fatih Karagümrük.

== Club career ==
Civelek is a youth exponent from Fenerbahçe. He made his cup debut on 2 December 2014 against Kayserispor in a 1–2 away defeat.
