= Fırat Aydınus =

Turkish football referee

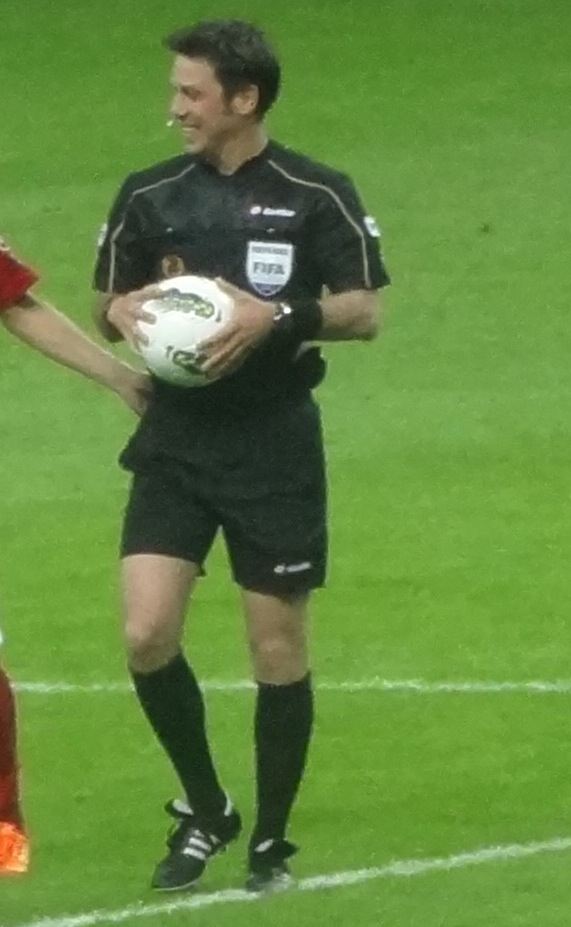
- Aydınus in 2012
- Born: 25 October 1973 (age 52); Istanbul, Turkey

Domestic
Years	League	Role
2003–2022	Süper Lig	Referee

International
Years	League	Role
2006–2018	FIFA listed	Referee

Fırat Aydınus (Turkish pronunciation: [ˈfɯɾat ˈajdɯnus]; born 25 October 1973) is a former Turkish international football referee. He studied and practiced geophysical engineering. In January 2012, he was promoted from UEFA Category 1 to the Elite Development category.

He refereed at the 2014 FIFA World Cup qualifiers. Aydınus took charge at the UEFA Champions League group stage matches for the first time in September 2012.
