= Uygar Mert Zeybek =

Turkish footballer

Personal information
- Date of birth: 4 June 1995 (age 31)
- Place of birth: Osmangazi, Bursa
- Height: 1.78 m (5 ft 10 in)
- Position: Midfielder

Team information
- Current team: Sarıyer
- Number: 22

Youth career
- 2007–2008: Boschspor
- 2008–2015: Fenerbahçe

Senior career*
Years	Team	Apps	(Gls)
2015–2019	Fenerbahçe	2	(0)
2019–2021	İstanbulspor	33	(4)
2021–	Pendikspor	6	(1)
2022	→ Tarsus İY (loan)	7	(1)
2022–2023	→ Afjet Afyonspor (loan)	29	(1)
2023–	→ Sarıyer (loan)	1	(0)

International career
2012	Turkey U17	2	(0)
2015	Turkey U21	2	(0)
- * Club domestic league appearances and goals as of 23 September 2023

Uygar Mert Zeybek (born 4 June 1995) is a Turkish footballer who plays as a midfielder for Sarıyer on loan from Pendikspor.

== Club career ==
Zeybek is a youth exponent from Fenerbahçe. He made his Süper Lig debut at 31 May 2015 against Kasımpaşa. He replaced Emre Belözoğlu in extra time in a 2-0 home win.

Club	Season	Division	League		Cup		Super Cup		Continental		Total	
Club	Season	Division	Apps	Goals	Apps	Goals	Apps	Goals	Apps	Goals	Apps	Goals
Fenerbahçe U21	2012-13	A2 Ligi	10	0	–		–		–		10	0
Fenerbahçe U21	2013-14	A2 Ligi	33	13	–		–		–		33	13
Fenerbahçe U21	2014-15	A2 Ligi	13	3	–		–		–		13	3
Fenerbahçe U21	Total		56	16	–		–		–		56	16
Fenerbahçe	2014–15	Süper Lig	1	0	9	0	0	0	–		10	0
Fenerbahçe	2015–16	Süper Lig	1	0	0	0	–		1	0	2	0
Fenerbahçe	Total		2	0	9	0	0	0	1	0	12	0
Career total			58	16	9	0	0	0	1	0	68	16
