= Erten Ersu =

Turkish footballer (born 1994)

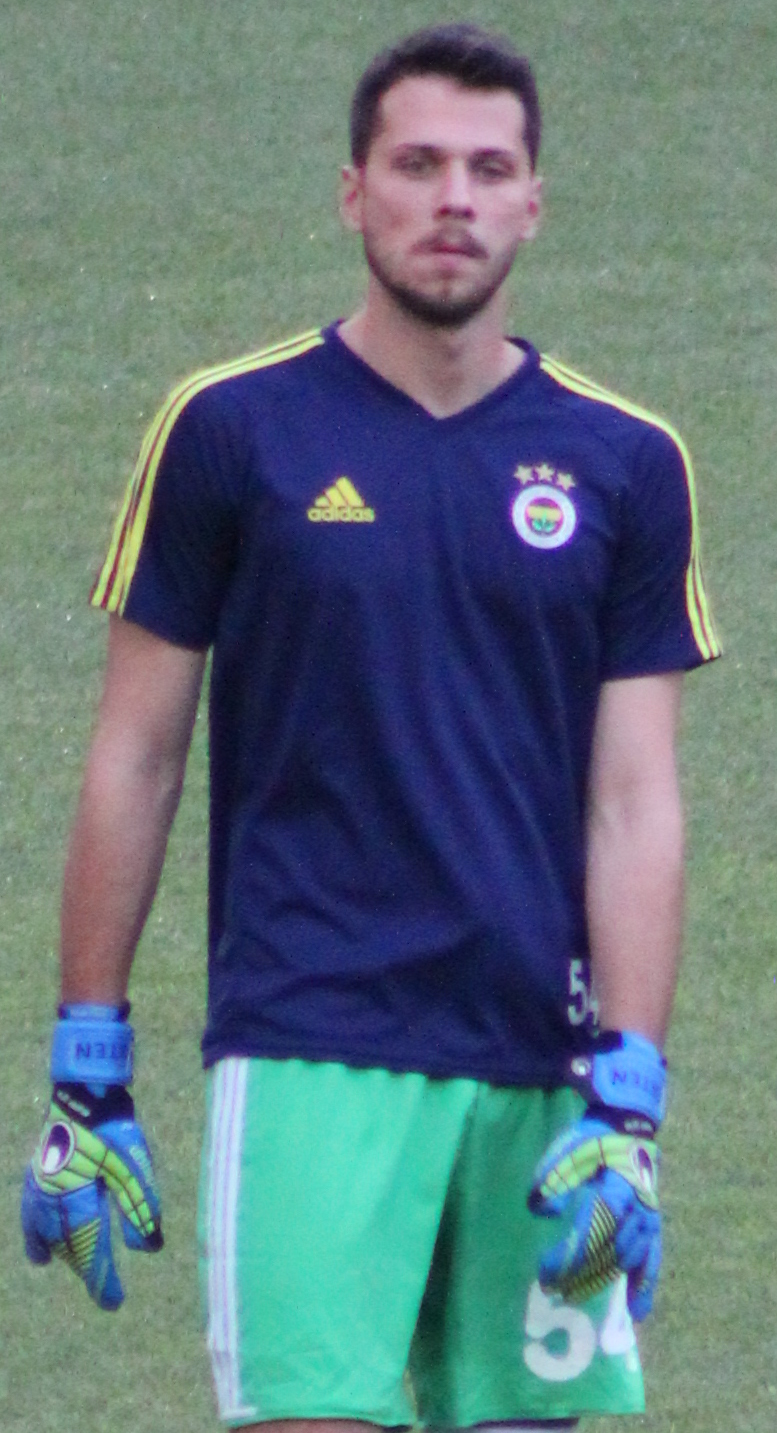
- Ersu with Fenerbahçe in 2017

Personal information
- Date of birth: 21 April 1994 (age 32)
- Place of birth: Bakırköy, Turkey
- Height: 1.95 m (6 ft 5 in)
- Position: Goalkeeper

Team information
- Current team: Kepezspor
- Number: 13

Youth career
- 2005–2013: Fenerbahçe

Senior career*
Years	Team	Apps	(Gls)
2013–2020	Fenerbahçe	0	(0)
2016–2017	→ Gaziantepspor (loan)	2	(0)
2020–2022	Konyaspor	2	(0)
2022–2023	Gaziantep	0	(0)
2024–2025	Gostivar	24	(0)
2025	Ankaragücü	2	(0)
2025–2026	Serikspor	9	(0)
2026–	Kepezspor	8	(0)

International career^{‡}
2009	Turkey U15	4	(0)
2009–2010	Turkey U17	1	(0)
2011	Turkey U19	1	(0)
- * Club domestic league appearances and goals as of 15 November 2026 ‡ National team caps and goals as of 19:42, 4 February 2022 (UTC)

Erten Ersu (born 21 April 1994) is a Turkish footballer who plays as a goalkeeper for TFF 3. Lig club Kepezspor.

== Professional career ==
Ersu began his career in Fenerbahçe's youth team in 2005. From 2011 to 2020, which is the year he left, he didn't appear in any league competition. He made his professional debut on 3 March 2015 with Fenerbahçe in a 5-0 Turkish Cup win against Bayburt Özel İdarespor, replacing Mert Günok after 84 minutes.

On 15 August 2016, Ersu was loaned out to another Süper Lig club Gaziantepspor. He made his debut on 22 September 2016 in a 2-0 Turkish Cup win against Eyüpspor. Ersu, appeared in 8 Turkish Cup and 2 Süper Lig competitions with Gaziantepspor.

On 30 July 2020, Ersu announced he would leave Fenerbahçe after 18 years, including the youth teams. On 22 September 2020, Konyaspor announced the signing of Ersu on a two-year deal.

On 20 July 2022, Ersu signed a two-year contract with Gaziantep.

On 1 January 2024, Ersu signed a contract with KF Gostivari.

== Personal life ==
Ersu enjoys watching Formula 1.
