= List of Fenerbahçe S.K. footballers =

When it was first founded in 1907, Fenerbahçe had a large squad. The first team captain of the Fenerbahçe football team was Turkish Naval School student Necip Okaner, the club's 3rd founding member. The first goalkeeper of the team was Asaf Beşpınar, a student of Kadıköy Lycée Saint-Joseph. Galip Kulaksızoğlu, was the longest serving player of the original squad, spending 17 years at the club, retiring in 1924 after 216 matches. Zeki Rıza Sporel and Bekir Refet, the first Turkish footballer ever to play abroad, were among the first products of the Fenerbahçe youth system. During his 18-year career with the club, Zeki Rıza scored 470 goals in 352 matches, or 1.3 goals every match, making him the all-time top scorer of Fenerbahçe. Zeki Rıza was also capped for the Turkish national team 16 times, scoring 15 goals.

Cihat Arman became the first in a long-line of long-serving goalkeepers, playing 12 seasons and in 308 matches with the club. Lefter Küçükandonyadis was one of the first Turkish football players to play in Europe. Lefter spent two seasons in Europe, playing for Fiorentina and Nice before returning to Fenerbahçe. All in all, Lefter scored 423 goals in 615 matches for the club, helping them to two Istanbul Football League titles and three Turkish League titles.

Another notable player, Can Bartu, became the next big Turkish export to Europe. He was also the first Turkish football player to play in a European competition final, doing so with Fiorentina against Atlético Madrid in 1962. Can also spent some seasons playing for Venezia and Lazio before returning to Fenerbahçe in 1967. He was a four-time league champion with Fenerbahçe and scored 162 goals in 330 matches. Some of the other most notable Turkish players who played for Fenerbahçe include: Fikret Arıcan, Fikret Kırcan, Halit Deringör, Melih Kotanca, Burhan Sargun, Nedim Doğan, Cemil Turan, Selçuk Yula, Müjdat Yetkiner, Oğuz Çetin, Rıdvan Dilmen, Aykut Kocaman, Rüştü Reçber and Tuncay Şanlı.

Former Romania goalkeeper Ilie Datcu was the first foreigner to reach 100 caps for Fenerbahçe. In recent decades, Fenerbahçe have gained an influx of foreigners who have helped the club to 19 Süper Lig titles. Among these is Uche Okechukwu, who after 13 seasons with Fenerbahçe and İstanbulspor became the longest serving foreigner in Turkey. During Uche's career with Fenerbahçe, he won two league titles and became a fan favourite. More recently, Fenerbahçe have been the home to Brazilian-born Mehmet Aurélio who, in 2006, became the first naturalized Turkish citizen to play for the Turkish national team.

Alex is another Brazilian player who scored the most goals of all foreign players who have played for Fenerbahçe. He managed to become top scorer of the Turkish Süper Lig on two occasions (in 2006–07 and 2010–11), Turkish Footballer of the Year twice (in 2005 and 2010), as well as assist leader in the 2007–08 season of the UEFA Champions League. Based on said achievements, as well as his acknowledged character and sportsmanship on and off the field by fans of Fenerbahçe and their rivals alike, he became the most successful and renowned foreign player to have ever played for the club and one of a few whose statue has been erected by the supporters of the club in the Yoğurtçu Park, in the near of Şükrü Saracoğlu Stadium.

Some of the other foreign top players who played for Fenerbahçe over the years include: Toni Schumacher (1988–91), Jes Høgh (1995–99), Jay-Jay Okocha (1996–98), Elvir Bolić (1995–2000), Kennet Andersson (2000–02), Ariel Ortega(2002–03), Pierre van Hooijdonk (2003–05), Nicolas Anelka (2005–06), Stephen Appiah (2005–08), Mateja Kežman(2006–09), Diego Lugano (2006–11), Roberto Carlos (2007–09), Dirk Kuyt (2012–15), Raul Meireles (2012–16), Robin van Persie (2015–18), Nani (2015–16), Simon Kjær (2015–17), Mesut Özil (2021–22), Leonardo Bonucci (2022–23), Dušan Tadić (2023–25)Edin Džeko (2023–25), Marco Asensio (2025–present) and Ederson (2025–present).

Period	Players
^{1934 - 1956 (22 years, 412 Match)}	Fikret Kırcan
^{1927 - 1947 (20 years, 406 Match)}	Fikret Arıcan
^{1915 - 1934 (19 years, 325 Match)}	Zeki Rıza Sporel
^{2002 - 2019 (17 years, 526 Match)}	Volkan Demirel
1907 - 1924 (17 years, 257 Match)	Galip Kulaksızoğlu
1916 - 1932 (16 years, 324 Match)	Alaattin Baydar
^{1979 - 1995 (16 years, 763 Match)}	Müjdat Yetkiner
^{1947 - 1964 (15 years, 615 Match)}	Lefter Küçükandonyadis
^{1939 - 1953 (14 years, 308 Match)}	Cihat Arman
^{1925 - 1939 (14 years, 252 Match)}	Cevat Seyit
_{1955 - 1969 (14 years, 605 Match)}	Şeref Has
^{1932 - 1945 (13 years, 368 Match)}	Esat Kaner
^{1934 - 1947 (13 years, 388 Match)}	Naci Bastoncu

== List of players ==
Players highlighted in bold are still actively playing at Fenerbahçe.

Information correct as of the match played on 17 May 2026.

Name	Nationality	Position	Fenerbahçe career	Appearances	Goals
Ziya Songülen	Turkey	Defender	1906-1910 (Note: He is the number 2 member of the team and the 2nd president in history of club. He played as a goalkeeper in the Fenerbahçe football team, which first held training in June 1906, but started operating as a team in 1907)	18	4
Ayetullah Bey	Turkey	Goalkeeper	1906-1910	21	N/A
Necip Okaner	Turkey	Defender	1906-1909 (Note: He was the member 3rd of the team and the first captain of the team in Fenerbahçe’s history. He played in very few matches for the Fenerbahçe football team, the prototype of which was established in June 1906 but which became a fully-fledged football team in May 1907, until 1909, because he was an officer in the Ottoman Navy)	14	2
Asaf Beşpınar	Turkey	Goalkeeper	1906-1908	N/A	N/A
Sabri Çerkes	Turkey	Defender	1906-1917	59	N/A
Hassan Sami Kocamemi	Turkey	Defender	1906-1914	N/A	N/A
Galip Kulaksızoğlu	Turkey	Midfielder	1907–1924	216	—
Hasan Kamil Sporel	Turkey	Defender	1911–1923	108	—
Sait Selahattin Cihanoğlu	Turkey	Striker	1911–1917	114	94
Zeki Rıza Sporel	Turkey	Striker	1915–1934	352	470
Alaattin Baydar	Turkey	Striker	1915–1934	324	362
Sabih Arca	Turkey	Midfielder	1918–1929	215	—
Şekip Kulaksızoğlu	Turkey	Goalkeeper	1921–1926	102	0
Cevat Sait	Turkey	Midfielder	1925–1939	252	—
Fikret Arıcan	Turkey	Striker	1927–1947	406	231
Mehmet Reşat Nayır	Turkey	Midfielder	1928–1940	312	—
Muzaffer Çizer	Turkey	Striker	1928–1937	406	121
Esat Kaner	Turkey	Defender	1932–1946	368	—
Lebip Elmas	Turkey	Midfielder	1933–1944	218	—
Naci Bastoncu	Turkey	Striker	1934–1944	388	232
Fikret Kırcan	Turkey	Midfielder	1934–1956	412	139
Cihat Arman	Turkey	Goalkeeper	1939–1952	308	0
Ömer Boncuk	Turkey	Midfielder	1939–1947	166	14
Melih Kotanca	Turkey	Striker	1939–1948	185	204
Murat Alyüz	Turkey	Defender	1941–1952	314	—
Halit Deringör	Turkey	Striker	1941–1952	330	107
Samim Var	Turkey	Midfielder	1943–1951	212	—
Selahattin Torkal	Turkey	Defender	1944–1961	219	—
Mehmet Ali Has	Turkey	Midfielder	1946–1956	274	—
Lefter Küçükandonyadis	Turkey	Striker	1947–1951; 1953–1964	615	423
Kamil Ekin	Turkey	Midfielder	1947–1955	227	—
Nedim Günar	Turkey	Midfielder	1949–1963	416	—
Akgün Kaçmaz	Turkey	Midfielder	1951–1961	328	—
Niyazi Tamakan	Turkey	Midfielder	1952–1960	273	27
Basri Dirimlili	Turkey	Defender	1953–1963	372	—
Naci Erdem	Turkey	Midfielder	1953–1963	440	—
Avni Kalkavan	Turkey	Midfielder	1953–1963	315	—
Şeref Has	Turkey	Midfielder	1955–1969	605	168
Ergun Öztuna	Turkey	Midfielder	1956–1969	219	—
Şükrü Ersoy	Turkey	Goalkeeper	1957–1962	262	0
Can Bartu	Turkey	Forward	1957–1961; 1969–1970	330	162
Mustafa Güven	Turkey	Midfielder	1958–1965	268	—
Osman Göktan	Turkey	Midfielder	1958–1965	310	—
Yüksel Gündüz	Turkey	Striker	1958–1965	268	115
Özcan Köksoy	Turkey	Midfielder	1961–1970	281	—
Selim Soydan	Turkey	Midfielder	1961–1971	306	—
Nedim Doğan	Turkey	Striker	1961–1973	416	101
Hazım Cantez	Turkey	Goalkeeper	1962–1968	226	0
Fuat Saner	Turkey	Midfielder	1963–1973	240	—
Ali İhsan Okçuoğlu	Turkey	Midfielder	1963–1967	142	—
Ogün Altıparmak	Turkey	Striker	1963–1971	295	120
Ercan Aktuna	Turkey	Defender	1964–1974	340	—
Ziya Şengül	Turkey	Defender	1964–1975	426	—
Şükrü Birand	Turkey	Defender	1964–1975	317	—
Yılmaz Şen	Turkey	Defender	1964–1976	406	—
Yaşar Mumcuoğlu	Turkey	Striker	1965–1973	295	42
Abdullah Çevrim	Turkey	Striker	1966–1970	166	25
Levent Engineri	Turkey	Defender	1967–1973	275	—
Serkan Acar	Turkey	Defender	1967–1978	295	—
Ion Nunweiller	Romania	Defender	1968–1970	91	7
Ilie Datcu	Romania	Goalkeeper	1969–1975	220	0
Önder Mustafaoğlu	Turkey	Midfielder	1971–1981	261	—
Osman Arpacıoğlu	Turkey	Striker	1971–1977	278	129
Cemil Turan	Turkey	Striker	1972–1980	304	194
Alpaslan Eratlı	Turkey	Defender	1973–1983	414	—
Ender Konca	Turkey	Midfielder	1973–1977	176	—
Onur Kayador	Turkey	Defender	1974–1987	360	—
Yenal Kaçıra	Turkey	Defender	1975–1979	203	—
Engin Verel	Turkey	Midfielder	1975–1978; 1983–1986	264	—
Cem Pamiroğlu	Turkey	Defender	1976–1986	508	—
Müjdat Yetkiner	Turkey	Defender, Midfielder	1979–1995	763	26
Erdoğan Arıca	Turkey	Defender	1981–1986	241	—
Önder Çakar	Turkey	Midfielder	1981–1987; 1983–1986	221	—
Selçuk Yula	Turkey	Striker	1981–1986	304	134
İsmail Kartal	Turkey	Defender	1983–1993	390	—
Harald Schumacher	Germany	Goalkeeper	1987–1991	98	0
Oğuz Çetin	Turkey	Striker	1988–1996	346	50
Aykut Kocaman	Turkey	Striker	1988–1996	311	166
Uche Okechukwu	Nigeria	Defender	1993–2002	191	19
Jay-Jay Okocha	Nigeria	Attacking midfielder	1996–1998	63	30
Viorel Moldovan	Romania	Forward	1998–2000	59	34
Haim Revivo	Israel	Forward	2000–2002	68	30
Rüştü Reçber	Turkey	Goalkeeper	1994–2003; 2004–2007	282	0
Elvir Bolić	Bosnia and Herzegovina	Forward	1995–2000	175	73
Kennet Andersson	Sweden	Forward	2000–2002	73	19
Serhat Akın	Turkey	Striker	2000–2005	122	41
Ümit Özat	Turkey	Defender	2001–2007	182	11
Volkan Demirel	Turkey	Goalkeeper	2002–2019	525	0
Tuncay Şanlı	Turkey	Forward	2002–2007	154	59
Marco Aurélio	Brazil	Defensive midfielder	2003–2008	123	10
Pierre van Hooijdonk	Netherlands	Striker	2003–2005	61	34
Nicolas Anelka	France	Forward	2004–2006	53	16
Alexsandro de Souza	Brazil	Attacking midfielder	2004–2012	319	166
Deivid de Souza	Brazil	Attacking midfielder	2006–2010	94	23
Diego Lugano	Uruguay	Defender	2006–2011	125	21
Mateja Kežman	Serbia	Striker	2006–2008	67	28
Roberto Carlos	Brazil	Defender	2007–2009	103	9
Gökhan Gönül	Turkey	Right wingback	2007–2016; 2020–2021	361	14
Emre Belözoğlu	Turkey	Midfielder	2008–2012; 2013–2015; 2019–2020	227	33
Cristian Baroni	Brazil	Midfielder	2009–2014	183	25
Mehmet Topuz	Turkey	Midfielder	2009–2016	170	9
Caner Erkin	Turkey	Left wingback	2010–2016; 2020–2021	250	16
Joseph Yobo	Nigeria	Defender	2010–2014	113	3
Miroslav Stoch	Slovakia	Winger	2010–2017	122	20
Dirk Kuyt	Netherlands	Forward	2012–2015	130	37
Moussa Sow	Senegal	Forward	2012–2015; 2016–2017	185	75
Raul Meireles	Portugal	Defensive midfielder	2012–2016	105	8
Hasan Ali Kaldırım	Turkey	Left wingback	2012–2020	246	8
Mehmet Topal	Turkey	Defensive midfielder	2012–2019	297	24
Bruno Alves	Portugal	Defender	2013–2016	101	4
Alper Potuk	Turkey	Midfielder	2013–2020	214	17
Josef de Souza	Brazil	Defensive midfielder	2015–2018	136	16
Şener Özbayraklı	Turkey	Right wingback	2015–2019	110	5
Ozan Tufan	Turkey	Midfielder	2015–2022	182	21
Fernandão	Brazil	Forward	2015–2018	104	50
Robin van Persie	Netherlands	Forward	2015–2018	87	36
Martin Škrtel	Slovakia	Defender	2016–2019	119	7
Roman Neustädter	Russia	Defender	2016–2019	108	7
Ferdi Kadıoğlu	Turkey	Winger	2018–2024	204	18
Miha Zajc	Slovenia	Midfielder	2019–2025	123	20
Serdar Aziz	Turkey	Defender	2019–2025	135	11
Altay Bayındır	Turkey	Goalkeeper	2019–2023	145	0
Luiz Gustavo	Brazil	Defensive midfielder	2019–2022	97	5
**Mert Hakan Yandaş**	Turkey	Midfielder	2020–	149	11
Enner Valencia	Ecuador	Forward	2020–2023	116	59
**İsmail Yüksek**	Turkey	Midfielder	2021–	157	4
Attila Szalai	Hungary	Defender	2021–2023	117	7
Bright Osayi-Samuel	Nigeria	Winger	2021–2025	178	7
**İrfan Can Kahveci**	Turkey	Midfielder	2021–	183	32
Edin Džeko	Bosnia and Herzegovina	Forward	2023–2025	99	46
Sebastian Szymański	Poland	Attacking midfielder	2023–2026	134	22
Dušan Tadić	Serbia	Attacking midfielder	2023–2025	109	29
Fred	Brazil	Midfielder	2023–2026	129	12
**Mert Müldür**	Turkey	Right wingback	2023–	118	5
**Jayden Oosterwolde**	Netherlands	Defender	2023–	109	3

== See also ==
- List of Fenerbahçe S.K. foreign footballers
