= 1907–08 Fenerbahçe S.K. season =

Fenerbahçe
1907–08 season
- President: (Ottoman Empire) Nurizade Ziya
- Manager: (Ottoman Empire) Enver Yetiker
- Stadium: Papazın Çayırı
Home colours

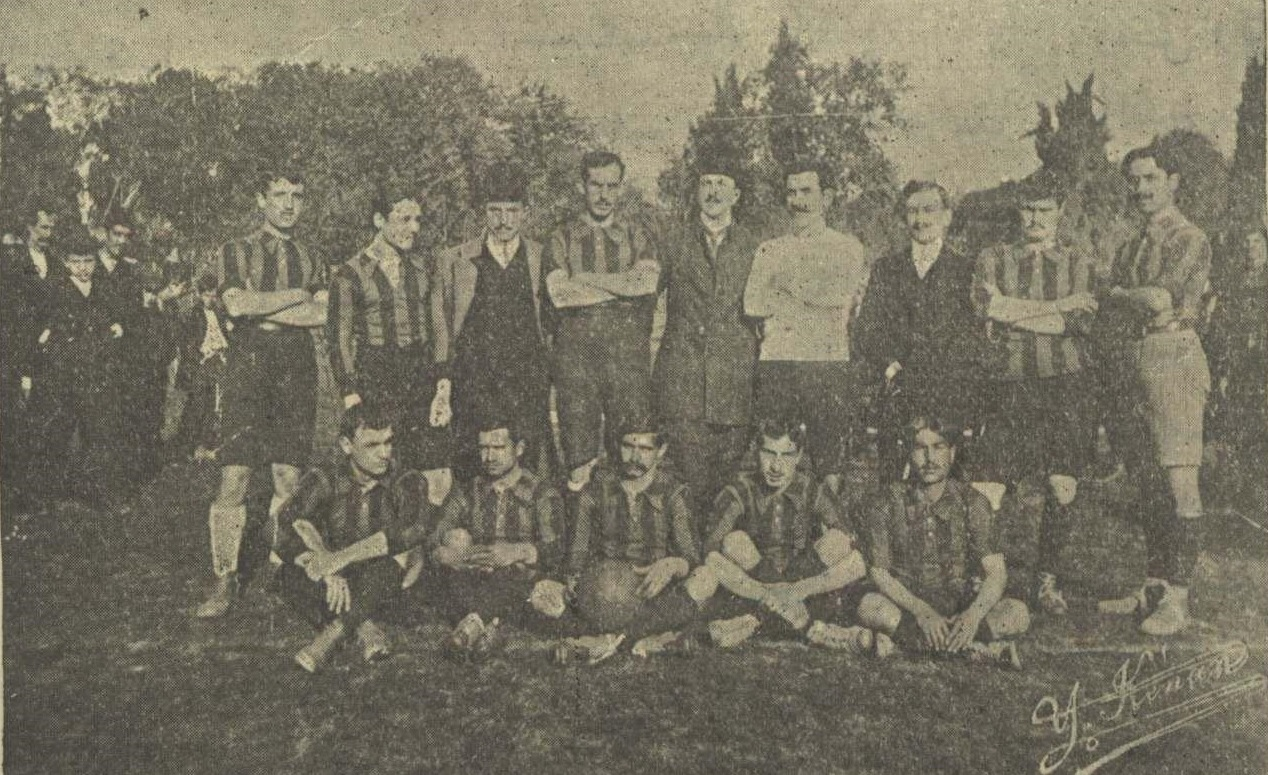
Ziya Songülen, the club's founder and first president, is the fourth person from the left standing

The 1907-1908 season was the second season for Fenerbahçe. The club played some friendly matches against local clubs.

== Squad statistics ==
No.	Pos.	Name				
No.	Pos.	Name	Apps	Goals	Apps	Goals
-	GK	(Ottoman Empire) Ayetullah Bey	0	0	0	0
-	DF	(Ottoman Empire) Asaf Beşpınar	0	0	0	0
-	DF	(Ottoman Empire) Ziya Songülen	0	0	0	0
-	DF	(Ottoman Empire) Galip Kulaksızoğlu	0	0	0	0
-	DF	(Ottoman Empire) Hassan Sami Kocamemi	0	0	0	0
-	MF	(Ottoman Empire) Necip Okaner(C)	0	0	0	0
-	MF	(Ottoman Empire) Sabri Çerkes	0	0	0	0
-	MF	(Ottoman Empire) Şevkati Hulusi Bey	0	0	0	0
-	MF	(Ottoman Empire) Nasuhi Baydar	0	0	0	0
-	MF	(Ottoman Empire) Hüseyin Dalaklı	0	0	0	0
-	FW	(Ottoman Empire) Fethi Bey	0	0	0	0
-	FW	(Ottoman Empire) Mazhar Bey	0	0	0	0
-	FW	(Ottoman Empire) Hayrullah Bey	0	0	0	0
-	FW	(Ottoman Empire) Hakkı Saffet Bey	0	0	0	0

== Friendly Matches ==
Kick-off listed in local time (EEST)

1 March 1908, Sunday

Fenerbahçe SK	4 – 0	Kumkapı AFC
	(Report)

Makriköy Sahası, Istanbul
Referee: unknown

5 July 1908, Friday

Fenerbahçe S.K.	8 – 0	Pera Club
	(Report)

Papazın Çayırı, Istanbul
Referee: unknown
