= 1908–09 Fenerbahçe S.K. season =

Fenerbahçe
1908–09 season
- President: (Ottoman Empire) Şevkipaşazade Ayetullah
- Manager: (Ottoman Empire) Hüseyin Dalaklı
- Stadium: Union Club Field
Home colours

The 1908–1909 season was the third season for Fenerbahçe. The club played some friendly matches against local clubs.

In 1908, Fenerbahçe updated its classic striped “çubuklu” yellow and navy kit, which remains to today

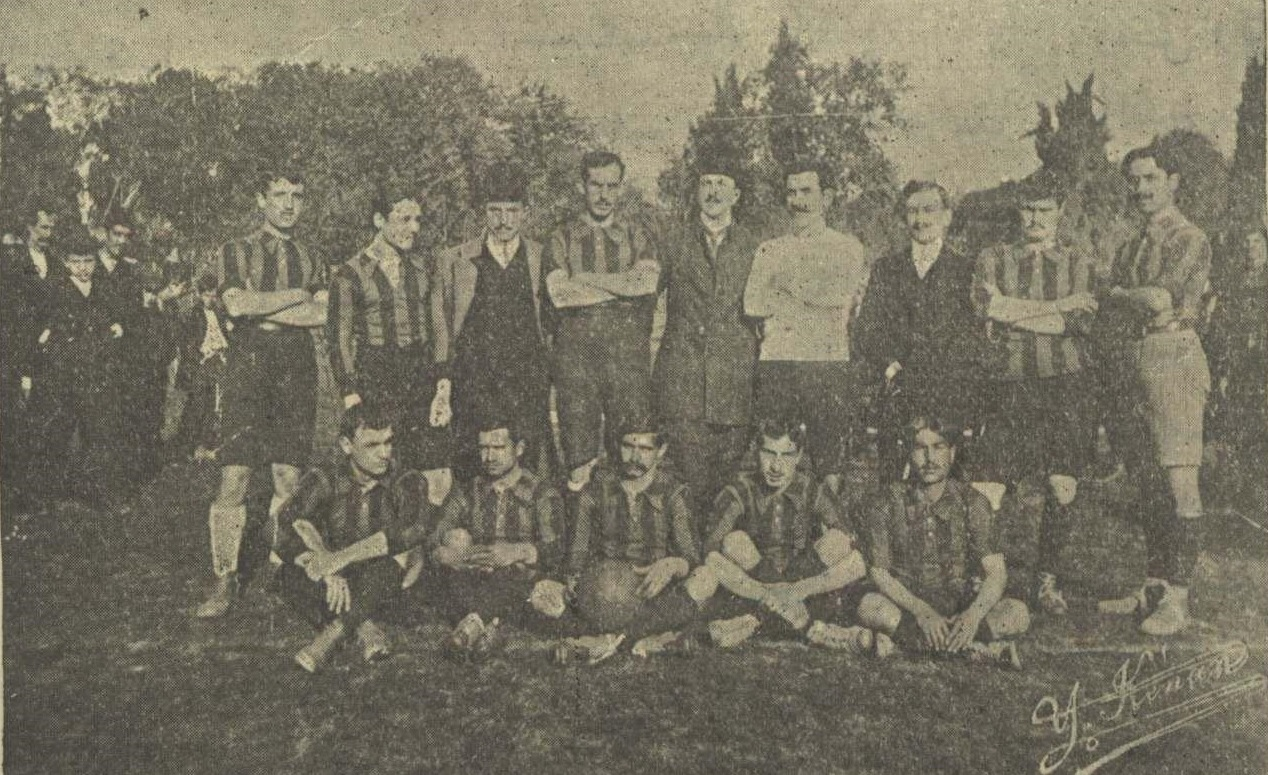
Ziya Songülen, the club's founder and first president, is the fourth person from the left standing. Photo taken before a football match played on November 8, 1908, with a team formed by the soldiers of HMS Barham

== Squad statistics ==
| No. | Pos. | Name | | | | |
| No. | Pos. | Name | Apps | Goals | Apps | Goals |
| - | GK | (Ottoman Empire) Ayetullah Bey | 0 | 0 | 0 | 0 |
| - | DF | (Ottoman Empire) Asaf Beşpınar | 0 | 0 | 0 | 0 |
| - | DF | (Ottoman Empire) Ziya Songülen | 0 | 0 | 0 | 0 |
| - | DF | (Ottoman Empire) Galip Kulaksızoğlu | 0 | 0 | 0 | 0 |
| - | DF | (Ottoman Empire) Hassan Sami Kocamemi | 0 | 0 | 0 | 0 |
| - | MF | (Ottoman Empire) Necip Okaner(C) | 0 | 0 | 0 | 0 |
| - | MF | (Ottoman Empire) Sabri Çerkes | 0 | 0 | 0 | 0 |
| - | MF | (Ottoman Empire) Şevkati Hulusi Bey | 0 | 0 | 0 | 0 |
| - | MF | (Ottoman Empire) Nasuhi Baydar | 0 | 0 | 0 | 0 |
| - | MF | (Ottoman Empire) Hüseyin Dalaklı | 0 | 0 | 0 | 0 |
| - | FW | (Ottoman Empire) Fethi Bey | 0 | 0 | 0 | 0 |
| - | FW | (Ottoman Empire) Mazhar Bey | 0 | 0 | 0 | 0 |
| - | FW | (Ottoman Empire) Hayrullah Bey | 0 | 0 | 0 | 0 |
| - | FW | (Ottoman Empire) Hakkı Saffet Bey | 0 | 0 | 0 | 0 |

== Friendly Matches ==
Kick-off listed in local time (EEST)

6 September 1908, Sunday

| Fenerbahçe | 2 – 0 | Moda FC |
|---|---|---|
| Galip Kulaksızoğlu ?? | (Report) |

Kuşdili Çayırı, Istanbul
Referee: unknown

Fenerbahçe SK:
| RB | 1 | (Ottoman Empire) Asaf Beşpınar |
| RB | 2 | (Ottoman Empire) Ziya Songülen |
| CB | 3 | (Ottoman Empire) Necip Okaner (c) |
| CB | 4 | (Ottoman Empire) Hassan Sami Kocamemi |
| LB | 5 | (Ottoman Empire) Hasan Kamil Sporel |
| RM | 6 | (Ottoman Empire) Sabri Çerkes |
| CM | 7 | (Ottoman Empire) Nasuhi Baydar |
| CM | 8 | (Ottoman Empire) Şefkati Hulusi |
| CM | 9 | (Ottoman Empire) Galip Kulaksızoğlu |
| FW | 10 | (Ottoman Empire) Hüseyin Dalaklı |
| FW | 11 | (Ottoman Empire) Hayrullah (Avukat) Bey |
Substitutes:
Manager:
(Ottoman Empire) Hüseyin Dalaklı

Kick-off listed in local time (EEST)

6 September 1908, Sunday

| Fenerbahçe | 0 – 2 | Cadi-Keuy FC |
|---|---|---|
| | (Report) | ? |

Kördere, Istanbul
Referee: unknown

Kick-off listed in local time (EEST)

11 October 1908, Sunday

| Fenerbahçe | 1 – 0 | HMS Imogene FC |
|---|---|---|
| ? | (Report) |

Kördere, Istanbul
Referee: unknown

Kick-off listed in local time (EEST)

25 October 1908, Sunday

| Fenerbahçe | 1 – 3 | Moda FC |
|---|---|---|
| ? | (Report) | ??? |

Kuşdili Çayırı, Istanbul
Referee: unknown
