= List of Fenerbahçe S.K. seasons =

Fenerbahçe is a major sports club based in Kadıköy, Istanbul, Turkey, competing in the Süper Lig. Established in 3 May 1907 in the Kadıköy district of Istanbul, the club was founded by Nurizade Ziya Songülen, Şevkipaşazade Ayetullah and Necip Okaner. As one of Turkey's most successful football teams, Fenerbahçe has been a dominant force in the national league and has also left a mark in European competitions.

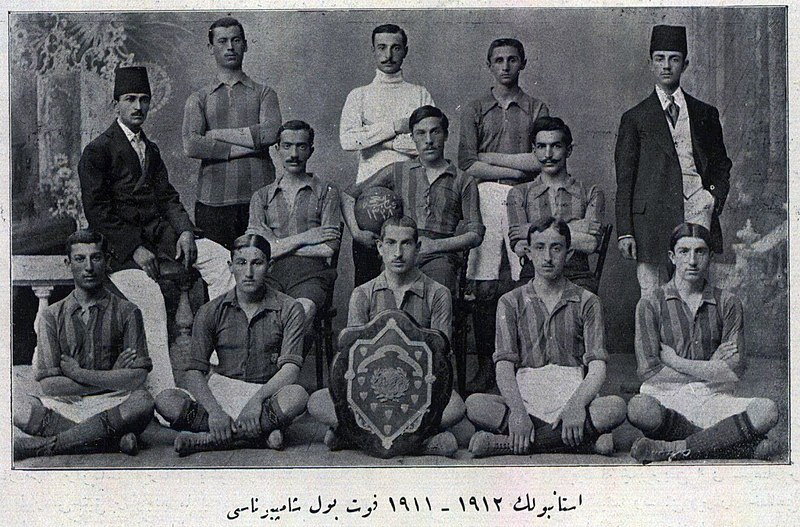
Fenerbahçe, with its first league championship trophy (1911)

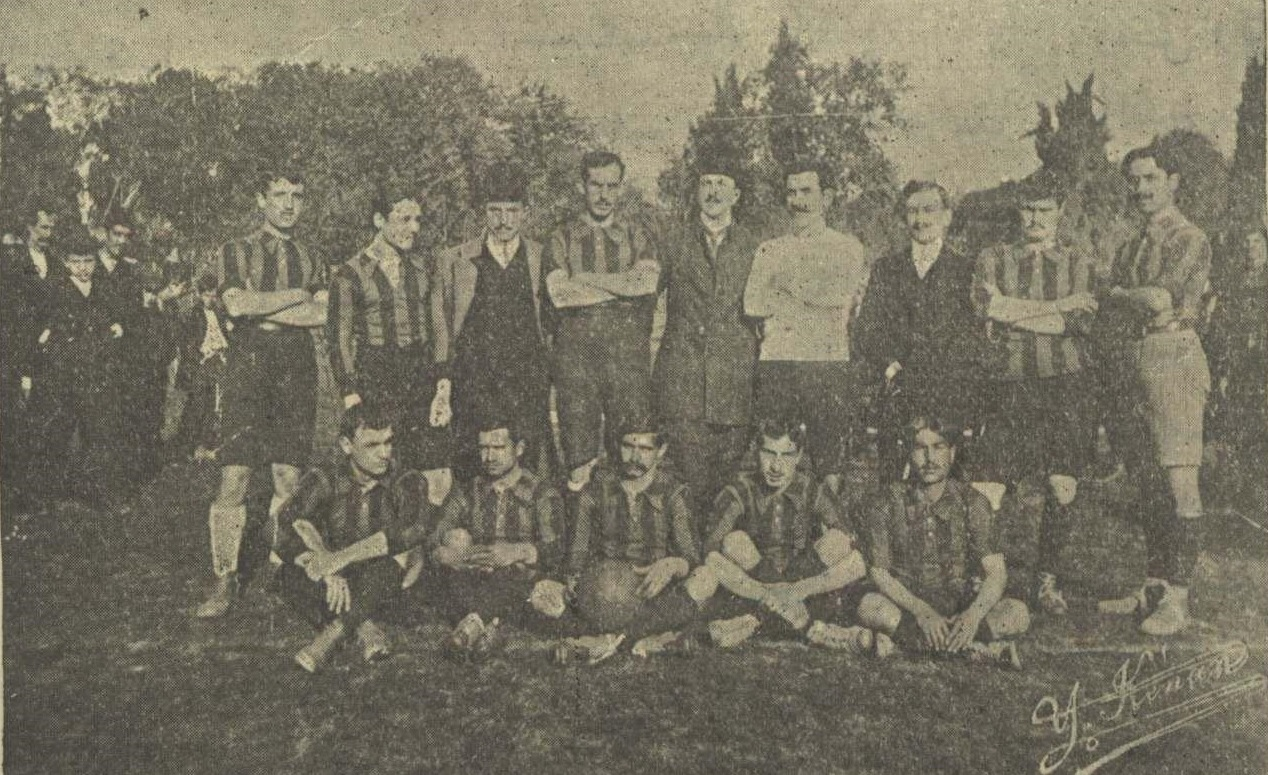
Fenerbahçe’s first squad (1907)

In its early years, Fenerbahçe participated in local football leagues in Istanbul, and in the 1908–09 season, it joined the Istanbul Football League, which held the status of a serious league for the first time. The first match identified to date is the one played in September 1907 against Cadi-Keuy AFC, a team formed by Englishmen in Istanbul. Nurizade Ziya Songülen—a founding father of Fenerbahçe who had witnessed football matches while studying in England—initiated the first steps toward establishing the club upon his return to his hometown of Istanbul in 1906, specifically in June of that year. The team began its first training sessions in June 1906 but was unable to establish a formal club organization until 1907, as it could not assemble a complete squad however, it finally attained the status of a full team in May 1907 with the inclusion of Turkish students from the Kadıköy Lycée Saint-Joseph. The club was among the founding members of the Süper Lig in 1959 and, alongside one of the three clubs that have never been relegated. Fenerbahçe has had a history of strong domestic performances, regularly finishing in the top three of the league and winning multiple league titles. Fenerbahçe has won the Süper Lig multiple times, with championship victories in 1959, 1960–61, 1963–64, 1964–65, 1967–68, 1969–70, 1973–74, 1974–75, 1977–78, 1982–83, 1984–85, 1988–89, 1995–96, 2000–01, 2003–04, 2004–05, 2006–07, 2010–11, 2013–14.

Fenerbahçe’s best European performances came in 2007–08, when they reached the quarter-finals of the UEFA Champions League, and 2012–13, when they made it to the UEFA Europa League semi-finals. The club has also consistently performed well in the UEFA Europa League, frequently reaching the knockout rounds.

== Past seasons ==
Results										Domestic		Continental			Top Scorer(s)		Ref.
Season	League	Pos.	Pld	W	D	L	GF	GA	Pts	TC	SC (Note: The Turkish Super Cup was originally called the Cumhurbaşkanlığı Kupası (Presidential Cup) from 1966 to 1998. No competition took place between 1999 and 2005.)	UCL	UEL (Note: The UEFA Europa League was originally known as the UEFA Cup from 1971 to 2009. It was renamed to the UEFA Europa League in 2009, and has since maintained its current status.)	UECL (Note: Includes UEFA Cup Winners' Cup)	Player(s)	Goals	Ref.
1959	Süper Lig	1st	16	13	2	1	33	8	26	–	–	–	–	–	Lefter Küçükandonyadis	6	
1959–60	Süper Lig	2nd	38	27	6	5	88	38	60	–	–	R1	–	–	Can Bartu	24	
1960–61	Süper Lig	1st	38	26	9	3	81	29	61	–	–	–	–	–	Lefter Küçükandonyadis	17	
1961–62	Süper Lig	2nd	38	23	7	8	64	30	53	–	–	R1	–	–	Lefter Küçükandonyadis	13	
1962–63	Süper Lig	3rd	42	24	12	6	73	28	60	RU	–	–	–	–	Lefter Küçükandonyadis	24	
1963–64	Süper Lig	1st	34	21	11	2	55	14	53	R3	–	–	–	QF	Aydın Yelken	17	
1964–65	Süper Lig	1st	30	18	11	1	52	13	47	RU	–	PR	–	–	Ziya Şengül	13	
1965–66	Süper Lig	4th	30	10	12	8	32	25	32	SF	–	PR	–	–	Ogün Altıparmak	15	
1966–67	Süper Lig	2nd	32	17	9	6	37	20	43	QF	–	–	–	–	Ogün Altıparmak	12	
1967–68	Süper Lig	1st	32	19	11	2	38	12	49	W	W	–	–	–	Ogün Altıparmak	12	
1968–69	Süper Lig	4th	30	13	9	8	34	25	35	SF	–	R2	–	–	Abdullah Çevrim	8	
1969–70	Süper Lig	1st	30	17	10	3	31	6	44	R1	RU	–	–	–	Ogün Altıparmak	8	
1970–71	Süper Lig	2nd	30	14	13	3	43	23	41	SF	–	R1	–	–	Ogün Altıparmak	20	
1971–72	Süper Lig	3rd	30	14	11	5	37	21	39	SF	–	–	R1	–	Osman Arpacıoğlu	20	
1972–73	Süper Lig	2nd	30	16	10	4	42	17	42	SF	W	–	R1	–	Osman Arpacıoğlu	20	
1973–74	Süper Lig	1st	30	15	13	2	39	15	43	W	RU	–	R2	–	Cemil Turan	29	
1974–75	Süper Lig	1st	30	15	13	2	43	18	43	QF	W	R2	–	–	Osman Arpacıoğlu	16	
1975–76	Süper Lig	2nd	30	14	12	4	40	18	40	R4	–	R1	–	–	Cemil Turan	20	
1976–77	Süper Lig	2nd	30	12	15	3	31	17	39	QF	–	–	R1	–	Cemil Turan	22	
1977–78	Süper Lig	1st	30	17	8	5	48	24	42	QF	RU	–	R1	–	Cemil Turan	19	
1978–79	Süper Lig	3rd	30	15	8	7	41	23	38	W	RU	R1	–	–	Raşit Çetiner	11	
1979–80	Süper Lig	2nd	30	12	11	7	31	27	35	QF	–	–	–	R1	Raşit Çetiner	13	
1980–81	Süper Lig	10th	30	9	11	10	31	27	29	SF	–	–	R1	–	Selçuk Yula	10	
1981–82	Süper Lig	3rd	32	15	11	6	48	26	41	QF	–	–	–	–	Selçuk Yula	17	
1982–83	Süper Lig	1st	34	18	13	3	43	20	49	W	RU	–	–	–	Selçuk Yula	30	
1983–84	Süper Lig	2nd	34	17	11	6	46	24	45	SF	W	R1	–	–	İlyas Tüfekçi	17	
1984–85	Süper Lig	1st	34	18	14	2	65	25	50	QF	W	–	R1	–	İlyas Tüfekçi	17	
1985–86	Süper Lig	5th	36	13	16	7	40	32	42	R5	–	R2	–	–	Şenol Çorlu	16	
1986–87	Süper Lig	5th	36	13	13	10	46	39	39	QF	–	–	–	–	Zafer Tüzün	11	
1987–88	Süper Lig	8th	38	15	10	13	45	43	55	R4	–	–	–	–	Ismail Kartal	10	
1988–89	Süper Lig	1st	36	29	6	1	103	27	93	RU	RU	–	–	–	Aykut Kocaman	32	
1989–90	Süper Lig	2nd	34	22	4	8	70	38	70	SF	W	R1	–	–	Şenol Çorlu	18	
1990–91	Süper Lig	5th	30	12	8	10	53	53	44	SF	–	–	R2	–	Aykut Kocaman	17	
1991–92	Süper Lig	2nd	30	23	2	5	81	35	71	R6	–	–	–	–	Aykut Kocaman	27	
1992–93	Süper Lig	5th	30	18	4	8	75	41	58	SF	–	–	R2		Tanju Çolak	32	
1993–94	Süper Lig	2nd	30	21	6	3	69	26	69	QF	–	–	–	–	Bülent Uygun	27	
1994–95	Süper Lig	4th	34	20	7	7	78	35	67	SF	–	–	R1	–	Aykut Kocaman	32	
1995–96	Süper Lig	1st	34	26	6	2	68	19	84	RU	RU	–	R1	–	Elvir Bolic	28	
1996–97	Süper Lig	3rd	34	22	7	5	79	25	73	QF	–	GS	–	–	Elvir Bolic	27	
1997–98	Süper Lig	2nd	34	21	8	5	61	25	71	QF	–	–	R1	–	Jay Jay Okocha	16	
1998–99	Süper Lig	3rd	34	22	6	6	84	29	72	~~B (Note: Fenerbahçe was banned from the Turkish Cup for one season after leaving the pitch during their quarter-final match against Trabzonspor in the previous season due to on-field incidents.)~~	–	–	R1	–	Elvir Baljić	21	
1999–2000	Süper Lig	4th	34	17	10	7	59	44	61	R32	–	–	R1	–	Viorel Moldovan	18	
2000–01	Süper Lig	1st	34	24	4	6	82	39	76	RU	–	–	–	–	Haim Revivo	16	
2001–02	Süper Lig	2nd	34	24	3	7	70	31	75	R4	–	GS	–	–	Serhat Akın	18	
2002–03	Süper Lig	6th	34	13	12	9	55	42	31	R2	–	3QR	R2	–	Washington	10	
2003–04	Süper Lig	1st	34	23	7	4	82	41	76	SF	–	–	–	–	Pierre van Hooijdonk	25	
2004–05	Süper Lig	1st	34	26	2	6	77	24	80	RU	–	GS	R32	–	Alex	28	
2005–06	Süper Lig	2nd	34	25	6	3	90	34	81	RU	–	GS	–	–	Nobre	21	
2006–07	Süper Lig	1st	34	20	10	4	65	21	70	SF	–	3QR	R32		Alex	20	
2007–08	Süper Lig	2nd	34	22	7	5	72	37	73	QF	W	QF	–	–	Mateja Kežman	19	
2008–09	Süper Lig	4th	34	18	7	9	60	36	61	RU	–	GS	–	–	Alex	17	
2009–10	Süper Lig	2nd	34	23	5	6	61	28	74	RU	W	–	R32	–	Alex	21	
2010–11	Süper Lig	1st	34	26	4	4	84	34	82	GS	–	3QR	POR	–	Alex	28	
2011–12	Süper Lig	2nd	34	20	8	6	61	34	68	W	~~C~~ ~~(Note: The 2011 Turkish Super Cup was set to feature Fenerbahç and Beşiktaş on July 31, 2011, at Erzurum Universiade Arena. However, the match was postponed and later canceled due to the match-fixing scandal investigations.)~~	~~Banned~~ ~~(Note: Fenerbahçe originally qualified for the 2011–12 Champions League group stage, but the TFF withdrew them one day before the draw due to match-fixing allegations. As a result, they were disqualified from the competition.)~~			Alex	17	
2012–13	Süper Lig	2nd	34	18	7	9	56	39	61	W	RU	POR	SF	–	Moussa Sow	19	
2013–14	Süper Lig	1st	34	23	5	6	74	33	74	R4	RU	Banned ~~(Note: UEFA banned Fenerbahçe from the 2013–14 European competitions due to the 2011 match-fixing scandal. The club appealed to the Court of Arbitration for Sport (CAS), which temporarily lifted the ban, allowing them to compete in the Champions League qualifiers, where they reached the play-off round but lost. However, CAS later upheld UEFA’s ban, disqualifying Fenerbahçe from the Europa League.)~~			Moussa Sow	16	
2014–15	Süper Lig	2nd	34	22	8	4	60	29	74	SF	W	Banned ~~(Note: Although Fenerbahçe qualified for the 2014–15 Champions League group stage as league champions, they were barred from European competitions due to a UEFA ban related to the 2011 match-fixing scandal, with this season counting as part of the suspension.)~~			Moussa Sow	16	
2015–16	Süper Lig	2nd	34	22	8	4	60	27	74	RU	–	3QR	R16	–	Fernandão	25	
2016–17	Süper Lig	3rd	34	18	10	6	60	32	64	SF	–	3QR	R32	–	Moussa Sow	15	
2017–18	Süper Lig	2nd	34	21	9	4	78	36	72	RU	–	–	POR	–	Giuliano	15	
2018–19	Süper Lig	6th	34	11	13	10	44	44	46	R16	–	3QR	R32	–	Roberto Soldado	7	
2019–20	Süper Lig	7th	34	15	8	11	58	46	53	SF	–	–	–	–	Vedat Muriqi	17	
2020–21	Süper Lig	3rd	40	25	7	8	72	41	82	SF	–	–	–	–	Enner Valencia	13	
2021–22	Süper Lig	2nd	38	21	10	7	73	38	73	R16	–	–	GS	KPO	Serdar Dursun	15	
2022–23	Süper Lig	2nd	36	25	5	6	87	42	80	W	–	2QR	R16	–	Enner Valencia	33	
2023–24	Süper Lig	2nd	38	31	6	1	99	31	99	QF	F ~~(Note: Fenerbahçe fielded their U19 team and left the pitch in protest, resulting in a 3–0 forfeit loss.)~~	–	–	QF	Edin Džeko	25	
2024–25	Süper Lig	2nd	36	26	6	4	90	39	84	QF	–	3QR	R16	–	Youssef En-Nesyri	30	
2025–26	Süper Lig	2nd	34	21	11	2	77	37	74	QF	W	POR	KPO	–	Talisca	27	
