= List of Fenerbahçe S.K. foreign footballers =

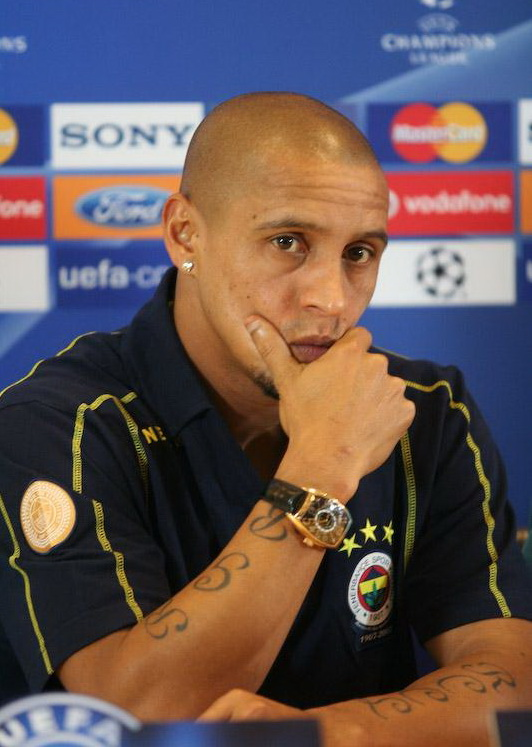
Roberto Carlos in 2007

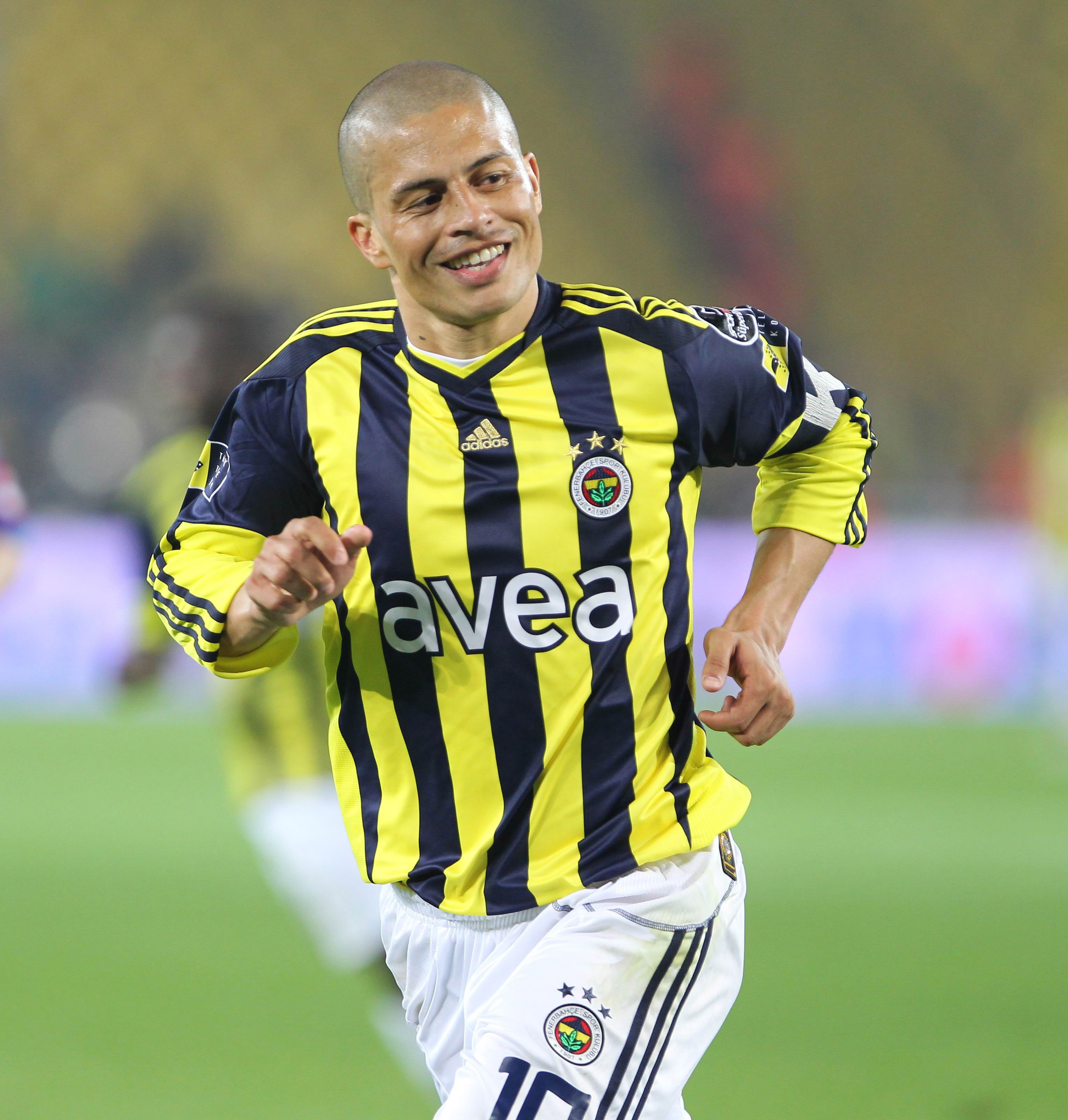
Alex in 2011

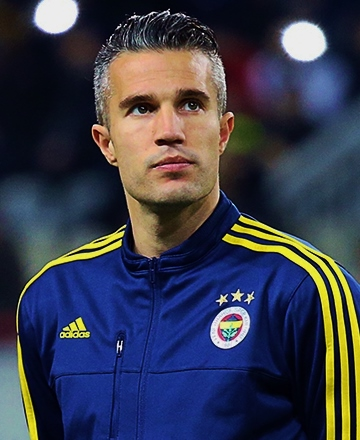
van Persie in 2016

Mesut Özil in 2021

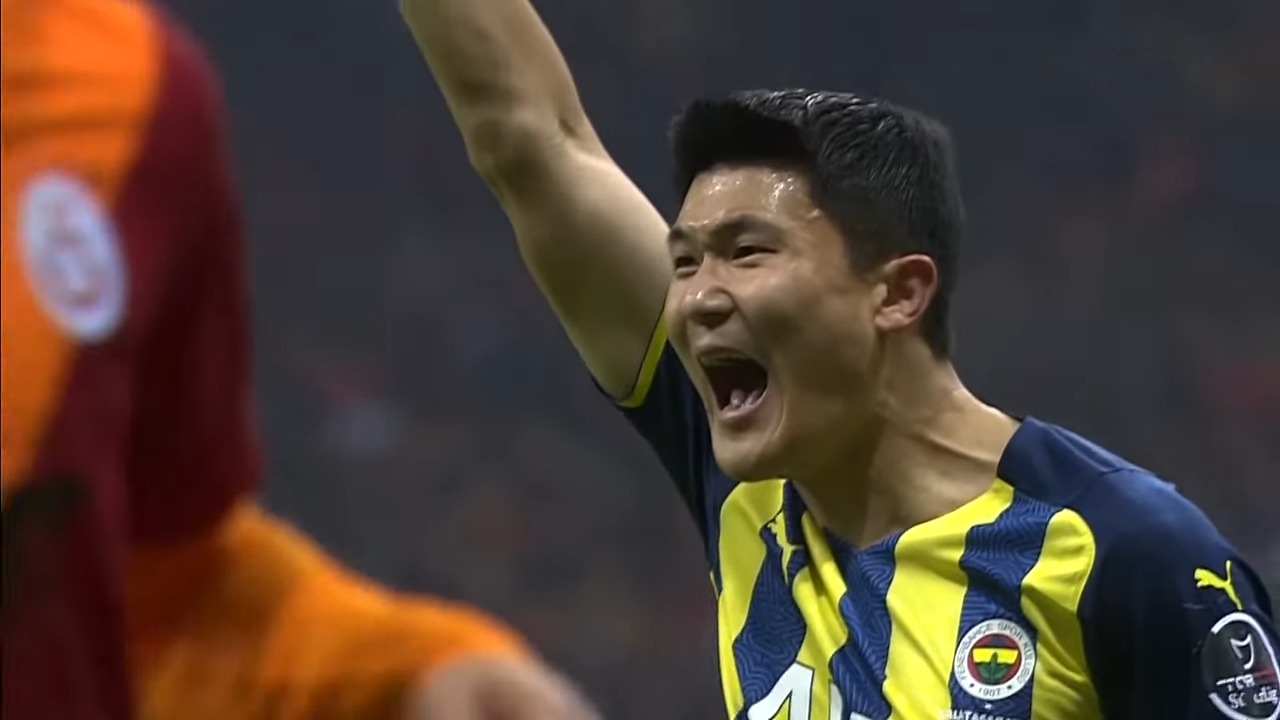
Kim Min-jae in 2021

N'Golo Kanté in 2026

Many many many many have played for Fenerbahçe since its founding in 1907. Among Fenerbahçe's foreign players, the largest number of them are Brazilian citizens. These are Alex, the foreign player with the most appearances for the club, world-renowned left-back Roberto Carlos; and another Brazilian national team players André Santos, Diego, Ederson, Edu Dracena, Fábio Luciano, Fred, Giuliano and Luiz Gustavo. Argentinian star Ariel Ortega and Uruguayan defender Diego Lugano are another notable South American players to have played for the club.

Numerous players from the Balkans have also played for the team. Among these are Bosnian striker Edin Džeko, Croatian forward Milan Rapaić, Serbian internationals Dušan Tadić, Filip Kostić, and Mateja Kežman.

Also worth mentioning are French star Nicolas Anelka, Germany's unforgettable goal-keeper Toni Schumacher and wizard midfielder Mesut Özil, Italian international defender Leonardo Bonucci, Swedish international striker Kennet Andersson, Spanish scorer Roberto Soldado, Dutch stars Pierre van Hooijdonk, Dirk Kuyt and Robin van Persie, Portuguese stars Bruno Alves, Raul Meireles and Nani.

Among the most important African players in the club's history are Nigerian stars Jay-Jay Okocha and Okechukwu Uche, Senegalese stars Mamadou Niang, Moussa Sow and Ghanaian star Stephen Appiah.

In addition, there are also players such as Levent Mercan (Germany U20), Sinan Gümüş (Germany U20) and Tolgay Arslan (Germany U21) who have played in the lower age group national teams of other countries but have not yet played in the senior national team. For this reason, they are still in the domestic player quota.

There are also football players who were transferred to other teams without playing in any official match despite being transferred by the club, prominent names among these are Senegalese Lamine Diack, Ivorian Marius Trésor Doh, South Korean Jo Jin-ho, Egyptian international defender Omar Fayed, Sierre Leonean international defender Steven Caulker. Azerbaijani international midfielder Ilgar Gurbanov.

Senegal U17 national midfielder Abdou Aziz Fall signed a 5-year contract until the end of 2029-30 season and Senegal forward Amara Diouf signed a 5-year contract until the end of 2030-31 season with Fenerbahçe and both players joined to Fenerbahçe Academy.

== Foreign captains ==
In Fenerbahçe's history, four players have served as team captains: Toni Schumacher (1988–1991), Alex (2007–2012), Mesut Özil (2021–2022) and Edin Džeko (2023–2025).

Uche Okechukwu, Elvir Bolić, Haim Revivo, Pierre van Hooijdonk, Roberto Carlos, Dirk Kuyt, Enner Valencia, Dušan Tadić, Fred, and Milan Škriniar, who served as vice-captains, have also served as captains during matches.

== Foreign topscorers ==
Two foreign footballers won Süper Lig topscorer award in club history; Alex scored 19 goals in 32 matches in 2006–07 Süper Lig season and scored 28 goals in 33 matches in 2010–11 Süper Lig season also Enner Valencia scored 29 goals in 31 matches in 2022–23 Süper Lig season.

== Foreign internationals ==
Throughout the club's history, many star players—such as Ariel Ortega, Alex, Ederson, André Santos, Diego Lugano, Pierre van Hooijdonk, Dirk Kuyt, Robin van Persie, Simon Kjær, Nani, Nicolas Anelka, N'Golo Kanté, Mateja Kežman, Dušan Tadić, Edin Džeko, Dani Güiza, Jay-Jay Okocha, Mamadou Niang, Stephen Appiah and Kim Min-jae had already played for their respective national teams prior to their transfers; meanwhile, others—such as Edu Dracena, Allahyar Sayyadmanesh, Bright Osayi-Samuel, Eljif Elmas and Roman Neustädter earned caps for their senior national teams after joining Fenerbahçe.

In addition, another star footballers such as Toni Schumacher, Kennet Andersson, Roberto Carlos, Papiss Cissé, Mathieu Valbuena, José Sosa, Adil Rami, Mesut Özil, Leonardo Bonucci and Fred also transferred to the club after retiring from their national teams.

In addition, there were also footballers who competed for different countries at the youth and senior national team levels. For example: Vedat Muriqi (Albania U21, Kosovo U21 and Kosovo), Victor Moses (England U21 and Nigeria), Roman Neustädter (Germany U21, Germany and Russia), Moussa Sow (France U21 and Senegal), Džoni Novak (Yugoslavia U21, Yugoslavia and Slovenia).

Players are listed below by theirs country. Players who have never played in an official match for the club are not included in the list.

== List of players ==
Players highlighted in bold are still actively playing at Fenerbahçe.

Information correct as of the match played on 8 November 2026.

Nationality	Name	Position	Fenerbahçe career	Appearances	Goals
Albania	Vasfi Samimi	Goalkeeper	1927–1928	?	?
Algeria	Yassine Benzia	Attacking midfielder	2018–2019	17	0
Algeria	Islam Slimani	Striker	2018–2019	25	5
Argentina	Ariel Ortega	Attacking midfielder	2002–2003	20	5
Argentina	Diego Perotti	Winger	2020–2021	4	3
Argentina	José Sosa	Midfielder	2020–2022	63	4
Belgium	Michy Batshuayi	Striker	2022–2024	75	44
Belgium	**Romelu Lukaku**	Striker	2026–	**16**	**1**
Bosnia and Herzegovina	Elvir Baljić (Note: Elvir Baljić acquired Turkish citizen in 1998 as Elvir Baliç)	Forward	1998–1999; 2000–2001	65	26
Bosnia and Herzegovina	Elvir Bolić (Note: Elvir Bolić acquired Turkish citizen in 1992 as Enver Cansun)	Striker	1995–2000	176	76
Bosnia and Herzegovina	Edin Džeko	Striker	2023–2025	99	46
Bosnia and Herzegovina	Asim Ferhatović (Note: He played for the national team of Yugoslavia)	Striker	1963–1963	7	1
Bosnia and Herzegovina	Demir Hotić	Striker	1993–1993	4	1
Bosnia and Herzegovina	Rade Krunić	Defensive midfielder	2024–2024	22	0
Bosnia and Herzegovina	Srebrenko Repčić	Attacking midfielder	1983–1985	62	13
Bosnia and Herzegovina	Fahrudin Zejnilović	Midfielder	1981–1981	2	0
Brazil	Alex (Note: Alex became the top scorer of the Super Lig twice, in the 2006–07 and 2010–11 seasons while playing for Fenerbahçe.) (Note: Alex is the foreign player who has played the most games in Fenerbahçe's history.) (Note: Alex is the first foreign player in Süper Lig history to pass the 100-goal threshold.)	Attacking midfielder	2004–2012	344	171
Brazil	André Santos	Left wingback	2009–2011	63	12
Brazil	Cristian Baroni	Midfielder	2009–2014	196	29
Brazil	Deivid	Forward	2006–2010	108	28
Brazil	Diego Carlos	Defender	2025–2025	5	0
Brazil	Diego	Attacking midfielder	2014–2016	75	8
Brazil	**Ederson**	Goalkeeper	2025–	**52**	**0**
Brazil	Edu Dracena	Defender	2006–2009	114	6
Brazil	Fabiano (Note: Fabiano is Brazilian and started to play for Cyprus in 2025)	Goalkeeper	2015–2017	31	0
Brazil	Fabiano Lima	Left wingback	2004–2004	14	0
Brazil	Fábio Bilica	Defender	2009–2012	71	1
Brazil	Fábio Luciano	Defender	2003–2006	119	17
Brazil	Fernandão	Striker	2015–2018	105	51
Brazil	Fred	Midfielder	2023–2026	129	12
Brazil	Gérson	Attacking midfielder	1991–1993	73	26
Brazil	Giuliano	Attacking midfielder	2017–2018	37	16
Brazil	Gustavo Henrique	Defender	2022–2023	23	3
Brazil	Jailson	Defensive midfielder	2018–2020	63	3
Brazil	Josef	Defensive midfielder	2015–2018	136	16
Brazil	Lincoln	Attacking midfielder	2022–2024	36	3
Brazil	Luan Peres	Defender	2022–2024	23	1
Brazil	Luiz Gustavo	Defensive midfielder	2019–2022	97	5
Brazil	Márcio Nobre (Note: Márcio Nobre acquired Turkish citizen in 2006 as Mert Nobre)	Striker	2004–2006	107	55
Brazil	Marco Aurélio (Note: Mehmet Aurélio is Brazilian and played for Turkey between 2006–2011)	Defensive midfielder	2003–2008	222	20
Brazil	Roberto Carlos	Left wingback	2007–2009	104	10
Brazil	Rodrigo Becão	Defender	2023–2026	38	2
Brazil	Sérgio	Forward	1998–1998	3	2
Brazil	Simão	Defensive midfielder	2002–2003	38	2
Brazil	Talisca	Forward	2025–2026	75	44
Brazil	Washington	Striker	2002–2003	12	9
Brazil	Wederson (Note: Wederson acquired Turkish citizen in 2007 as Gökçek Vederson)	Left wingback	2007–2010	72	4
Brazil	Willian Arão	Defensive midfielder	2022–2023	45	1
Bulgaria	Emil Kostadinov	Forward	1996–1997	25	11
Bulgaria	Ivaylo Petkov	Left wingback	2003–2004	18	1
Bulgaria	Stanimir Stoilov	Midfielder	1992–1993	11	3
Cameroon	Henri Bienvenu	Forward	2011–2012	44	12
Cameroon	Carlos Kameni	Goalkeeper	2017–2018	16	0
Cameroon	Pierre Webó	Striker	2013–2015	89	33
Cape Verde	Garry Rodrigues	Winger	2019–2020	29	4
Chile	Mauricio Isla	Right wingback	2017–2020	91	0
Chile	Claudio Maldonado	Defensive midfielder	2007–2009	27	0
Colombia	Jhon Durán	Striker	2025–2026	21	5
Croatia	Dominik Livaković	Goalkeeper	2023–2025	74	0
Croatia	Milan Rapaić	Forward	2000–2002	51	15
Croatia	Stjepan Tomas	Defender	2003–2004	27	0
Czech Republic	Michal Kadlec	Defender	2013–2016	63	4
Czech Republic	Filip Novák	Left wingback	2020–2022	51	3
Denmark	Jes Høgh	Defender	1995–1999	146	7
Denmark	Simon Kjær	Defender	2015–2017	88	5
Denmark	Brian Steen Nielsen	Midfielder	1993–1995	55	4
Denmark	Henrik Nielsen	Striker	1989–1990	19	5
Denmark	Frank Pingel	Striker	1994–1995	3	1
Denmark	Mathias "Zanka" Jørgensen	Defender	2019–2020	21	3
DR Congo	Marcel Tisserand	Defender	2020–2023	54	1
Ecuador	Enner Valencia (Note: Valencia became the top scorer of the Super Lig in the 2022–23 season while playing for Fenerbahçe.) (Note: Valencia is the foreign player who scored the most goals in a single season in Fenerbahçe's league history, with 29 goals in 31 matches.)	Forward	2020–2023	116	59
England	Horace Armitage (Note: Horace Armitage is the first foreign football player of the club history)	Midfielder	1907–1908	?	?
England	Dalian Atkinson	Striker	1995–1996	30	10
England	**Archie Brown**	Left wingback	2025–	**54**	**8**
England	**Mason Greenwood**	Forward	2026–	**20**	**10**
England	Ryan Kent	Winger	2022–2024	19	1
France	Nicolas Anelka	Forward	2004–2006	57	16
France	**Mattéo Guendouzi**	Midfielder	2026–	**42**	**4**
France	**N'Golo Kanté**	Midfielder	2026–	**36**	**2**
France	Adil Rami	Defender	2019–2020	7	0
France	Allan Saint-Maximin	Winger	2024–2025	31	4
France	Mathieu Valbuena	Winger	2017–2019	71	12
Germany	Mërgim Berisha	Forward	2021–2022	32	8
Germany	Mustafa Doğan (Note: He is of Turkish descent but preferred to play for Germany)	Defender	1996–2003	165	1
Germany	Robert Enke	Goalkeeper	2003–2003	98	0
Germany	Wilhelm Kohlhammer	Midfielder	1913–1916	35	5
Germany	Max Kruse	Forward	2019–2020	23	7
Germany	Max Meyer	Attacking midfielder	2021–2022	12	1
Germany	Mesut Özil	Attacking midfielder	2021–2022	37	9
Germany	Toni Schumacher	Goalkeeper	1987–1991	105	0
Germany	Andreas Wagenhaus	Defender	1993–1994	18	1
Ghana	Stephen Appiah	Midfielder	2005–2008	90	17
Ghana	André Ayew	Winger	2018–2019	38	5
Ghana	Alexander Djiku	Defender	2023–2025	75	2
Ghana	Samuel Johnson	Defensive midfielder	1999–2003	151	24
Ghana	**Kojo Peprah Oppong**	Defender	2026–	**7**	**0**
Ghana	Yaw Preko	Forward	1999–2000	22	7
Greece	Kostas Negrepontis (Note: He was a citizen of the Ottoman Empire, but later renounced his citizenship.)	Forward	1917–1918	?	?
Greece	Apostolos Nikolaidis	Defensive midfielder	1916–1918	?	?
Greece	Dimitrios Pelkas	Attacking midfielder	2020–2022	67	13
Guinea	Sidiki Cherif	Forward	2026–2026	15	3
Guinea	Simon Falette	Defender	2019–2020	12	0
Guinea	Souleymane Oularé	Forward	1999–2000	11	5
Hungary	Attila Szalai	Defender	2021–2023	117	7
Iran	Hossein Sadaghiani	Striker	1932–1933	?	?
Iran	Allahyar Sayyadmanesh	Forward	2019–2020	3	0
Israel	Omit Gonzales (Note: Omit Gonzales (Umut Güzelses) is Israeli-Turkish Sephardi Jews and played only one game for Turkey U21 in 2007)	Striker	2006–2007	2	0
Israel	Haim Revivo	Forward	2000–2002	68	30
Italy	Leonardo Bonucci	Defender	2024–2024	13	0
Italy	João Pedro (Note: João Pedro was youth international for Brazil U17 and played only one game for Italy in 2022)	Forward	2022–2023	28	5
Kosovo	**Vedat Muriqi** (Note: Vedat Muriqi acquired Turkish citizen in 2015 as Vedat Muriç)	Striker	2019–2020; 2026–	**54**	**26**
Kosovo	Fadil Vokrri	Striker	1990–1992	50	16
Mali	**Dorgeles Nene**	Forward	2025–	**50**	**11**
Mexico	Edson Álvarez	Defensive midfielder	2025–2026	18	0
Mexico	Diego Reyes	Defender	2018–2019	14	1
Morocco	Sofyan Amrabat	Defensive midfielder	2024–2025	45	3
Morocco	Aatif Chahechouhe	Forward	2016–2019	47	10
Morocco	Nabil Dirar	Right wingback	2017–2020	89	8
Morocco	Youssef En-Nesyri	Striker	2025–2026	79	38
Netherlands	**Nathan Aké**	Defender	2026–	**17**	**0**
Netherlands	Pierre van Hooijdonk	Striker	2003–2005	61	34
Netherlands	Vincent Janssen	Striker	2017–2018	18	5
Netherlands	Dirk Kuyt	Forward	2012–2015	130	37
Netherlands	Jeremain Lens	Winger	2016–2017	36	5
Netherlands	Anthony Musaba	Winger	2026–2026	22	2
Netherlands	**Jayden Oosterwolde**	Defender	2023–	**108**	**3**
Netherlands	Robin van Persie	Striker	2015–2018	87	36
Netherlands	Gregory van der Wiel	Right wingback	2016–2017	17	0
Nigeria	Emmanuel Emenike	Striker	2013–2015; 2016–2017	93	25
Nigeria	Victor Moses	Winger	2018–2019	23	5
Nigeria	Uche Okechukwu (Note: Uche Okechukwu acquired Turkish citizen in 1998 as Deniz Uygar)	Defender	1993–2002	233	21
Nigeria	Jay-Jay Okocha (Note: Jay-Jay Okocha acquired Turkish citizen in 1998 as Muhammed Yavuz)	Attacking midfielder	1996–1998	76	32
Nigeria	Bright Osayi-Samuel	Right wingback	2021–2025	178	7
Nigeria	Joseph Yobo	Defender	2010–2014	113	3
North Macedonia	Ezgjan Alioski	Left wingback	2022–2023	26	1
North Macedonia	Eljif Elmas	Attacking midfielder	2017–2019	47	4
Norway	Joshua King	Forward	2022–2024	54	12
Poland	Czesław Jakołcewicz	Defender	1990–1991	17	3
Poland	Piotr Soczyński	Defender	1991–1992	27	0
Poland	Sebastian Szymański	Attacking midfielder	2023–2026	134	22
Portugal	Bruma	Winger	2022–2023	5	0
Portugal	Bruno Alves	Defender	2013–2016	101	4
Portugal	Miguel Crespo	Midfielder	2021–2024	80	5
Portugal	Dimas	Left wingback	1998–1999	28	4
Portugal	Raul Meireles	Defensive midfielder	2012–2016	105	8
Portugal	Nani	Winger	2015–2016	47	12
Portugal	Luís Neto	Defender	2017–2018	16	0
Portugal	**Nélson Semedo**	Right wingback	2025–	**60**	**1**
Romania	Ilie Datcu (Note: Ilie Datcu acquired Turkish citizen in 1978 as İlyas Datça)	Goalkeeper	1969–1975	220	0
Romania	Sabin Ilie	Striker	1997–1997	12	3
Romania	Viorel Moldovan	Striker	1998–2000	59	34
Romania	Ion Nunweiller	Defender	1968–1970	91	7
Romania	Mircea Sasu	Striker	1970–1971	7	4
Russia	Vladimir Beschastnykh	Striker	2002–2003	12	1
Russia	Roman Neustädter (Note: Neustädter wore the national jersey for Germany twice between 2012–2013, and for Russia 13 times between 2016–2020.)	Defender	2016–2019	108	7
Senegal	Abdoulaye Ba	Defender	2015–2016	18	1
Senegal	Papiss Cissé	Striker	2020–2021	28	5
Senegal	Issiar Dia	Winger	2010–2012	48	6
Senegal	Mamadou Niang	Striker	2010–2011	33	15
Senegal	Moussa Sow	Forward	2012–2015; 2016–2017	185	75
Senegal	Mame Thiam	Forward	2020–2021	34	8
Serbia	Radomir Antić	Defender	1977–1978	28	2
Serbia	Radmilo Ivančević	Goalkeeper	1977–1979	55	0
Serbia	Mateja Kežman	Striker	2006–2008	69	30
Serbia	Filip Kostić	Midfielder	2024–2025	35	2
Serbia	Miloš Krasić	Winger	2012–2014	27	1
Serbia	Nikola Lazetić	Winger	2000–2002	46	6
Serbia	Lazar Lemić	Midfielder	1966–1967	16	2
Serbia	Živan Ljukovčan	Goalkeeper	1986–1988	57	0
Serbia	Lazar Marković	Winger	2015–2016	20	2
Serbia	**Ognjen Mimović**	Defender	2026–	**0**	**0**
Serbia	Miško Mirković (Note: Miško Mirković acquired Turkish citizen in 1997 as Mert Meriç)	Defender	2000–2002	52	3
Serbia	Zoran Mirković	Defender	2000–2003	86	3
Serbia	Stevan Ostojić	Striker	1971–1973	31	7
Serbia	Dušan Pešić	Attacking midfielder	1984–1988	128	18
Serbia	Vasilije Radović	Goalkeeper	1966–1967	19	0
Serbia	Miroslav Stević	Midfielder	2002–2003	18	1
Serbia	Dušan Tadić	Attacking midfielder	2023–2025	109	29
Serbia	Miroslav Tanjga	Defender	1992–1992	7	0
Slovakia	**Milan Škriniar**	Defender	2025–	**84**	**6**
Slovakia	Martin Škrtel	Defender	2016–2019	119	7
Slovakia	Miroslav Stoch	Winger	2010–2017	122	20
Slovenia	Džoni Novak	Midfielder	1992–1993	29	4
Slovenia	Miha Zajc	Midfielder	2019–2025	123	20
South Africa	John Moshoeu	Attacking midfielder	1997–2001	75	15
South Korea	Kim Min-jae	Defender	2021–2022	40	1
Spain	**Marco Asensio**	Attacking midfielder	2025–	**46**	**15**
Spain	Dani Güiza	Striker	2008–2010	98	35
Spain	Josico	Defensive midfielder	2008–2009	14	0
Spain	Roberto Soldado	Striker	2017–2019	59	19
Sweden	Kennet Andersson	Striker	2000–2002	73	19
Sweden	Samuel Holmén	Midfielder	2013–2014	6	0
Switzerland	Kemal Ademi	Striker	2020–2021	8	1
Switzerland	Michael Frey	Striker	2018–2020	23	5
Switzerland	Gustave Haenny	Midfielder	1908–1911	11	2
Switzerland	Murat Yakin (Note: He is of Turkish descent but preferred to play for Switzerland)	Defender	1998–1999	26	3
Switzerland	Reto Ziegler	Left wingback	2011–2013	59	1
Tanzania	Mbwana Samatta	Striker	2020–2022	33	6
Ukraine	Oleksandr Karavayev	Midfielder	2017–2017	6	1
Ukraine	Serhiy Rebrov	Forward	2002–2004	41	5
Ukraine	Ivan Vyshnevskyi (Note: He played for the national team of USSR)	Defender	1989–1990	15	0
Uruguay	Mauricio Lemos	Defender	2020–2023	15	0
Uruguay	Diego Lugano	Defender	2006–2011	125	21
Uruguay	Diego Rossi	Forward	2021–2023	90	10

== Photo gallery ==
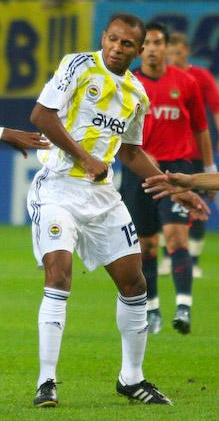
Mehmet Aurélio
(2003–2008)

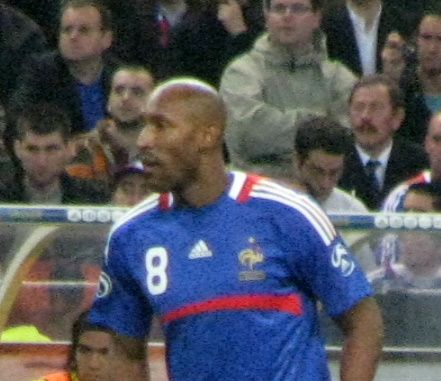
Nicolas Anelka
(2005–2006)

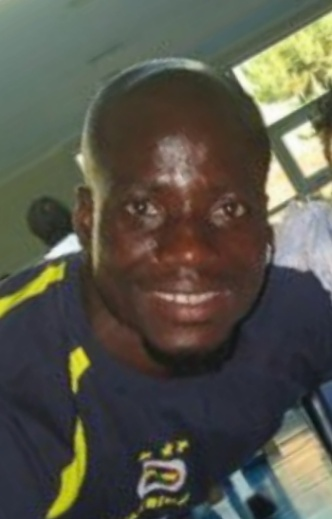
Stephen Appiah
(2005–2008)

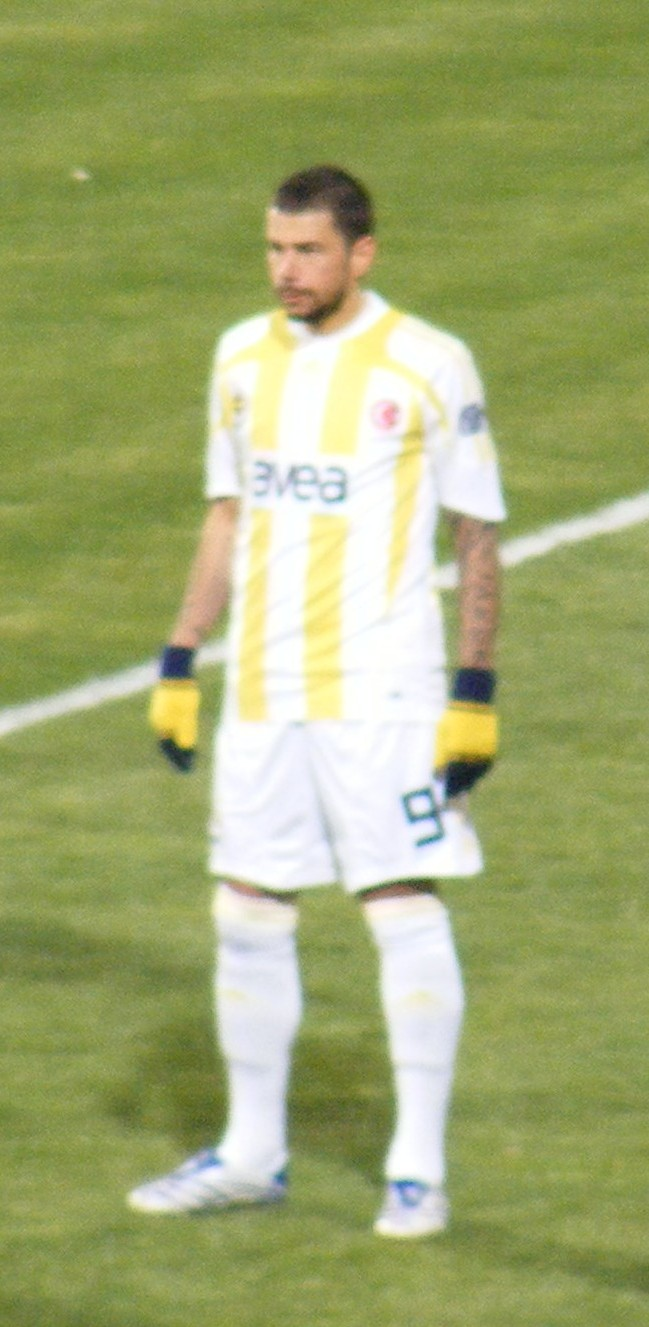
Mateja Kežman
(2006–2009)

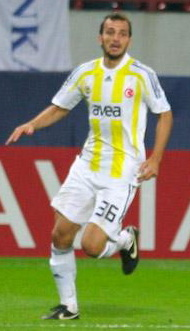
Edu Dracena
(2006–2009)

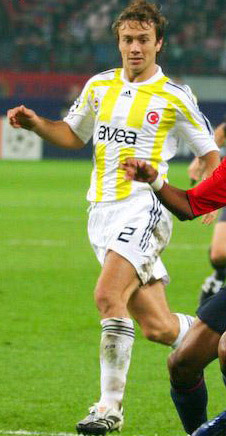
Diego Lugano
(2006–2011)

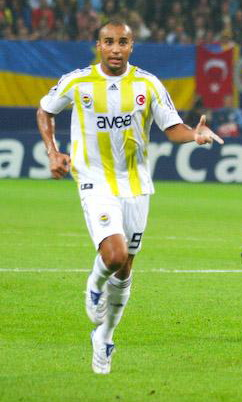
Deivid
(2006–2010)

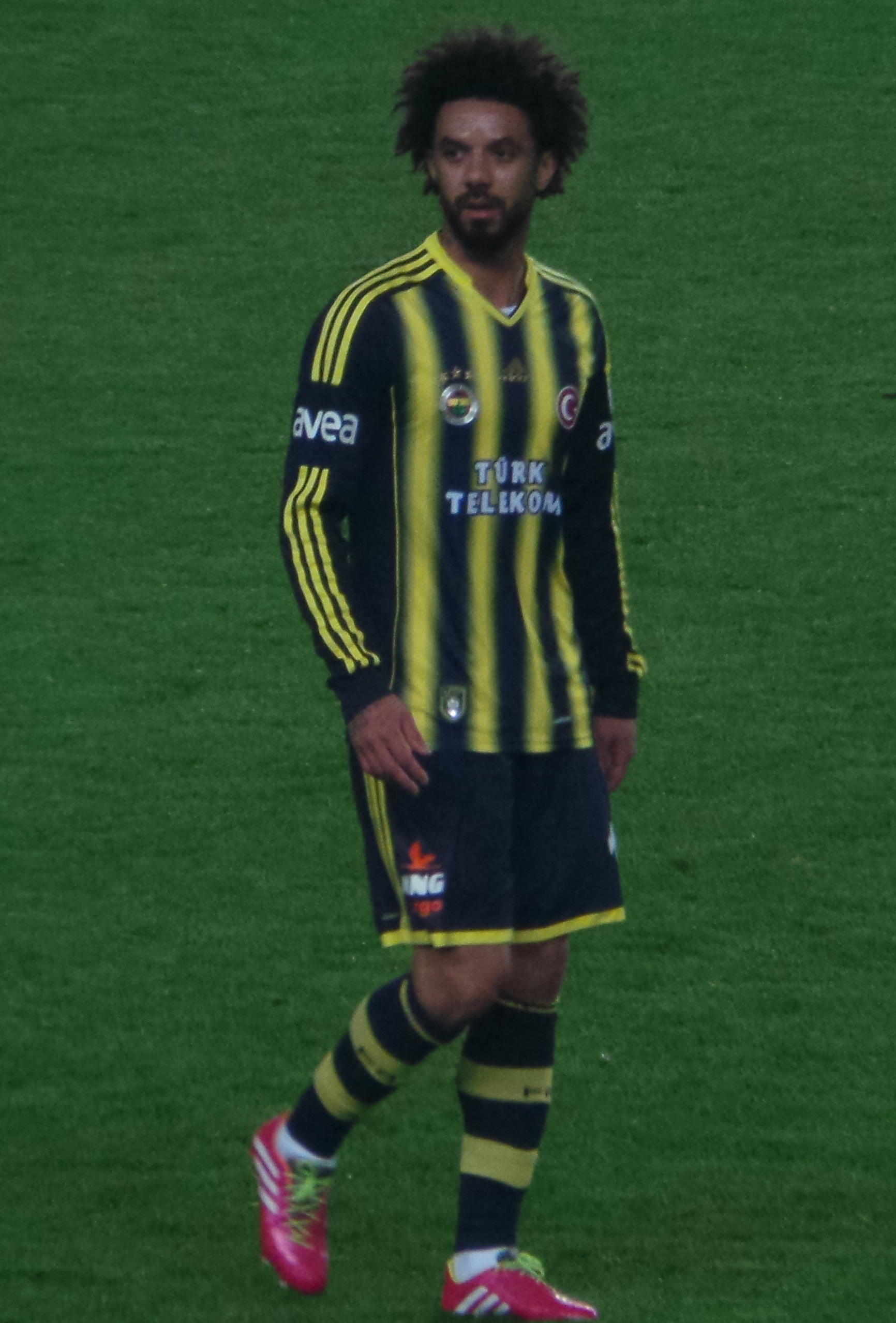
Cristian Baroni
(2009–2014)

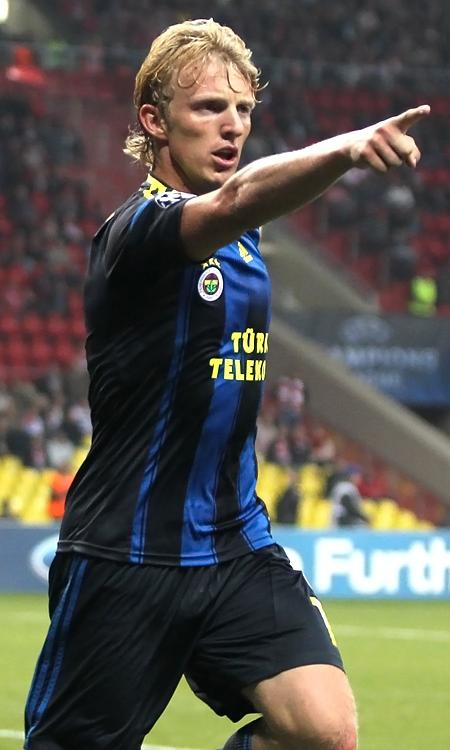
Dirk Kuyt
(2012–2015)

Raul Meireles
(2012–2016)

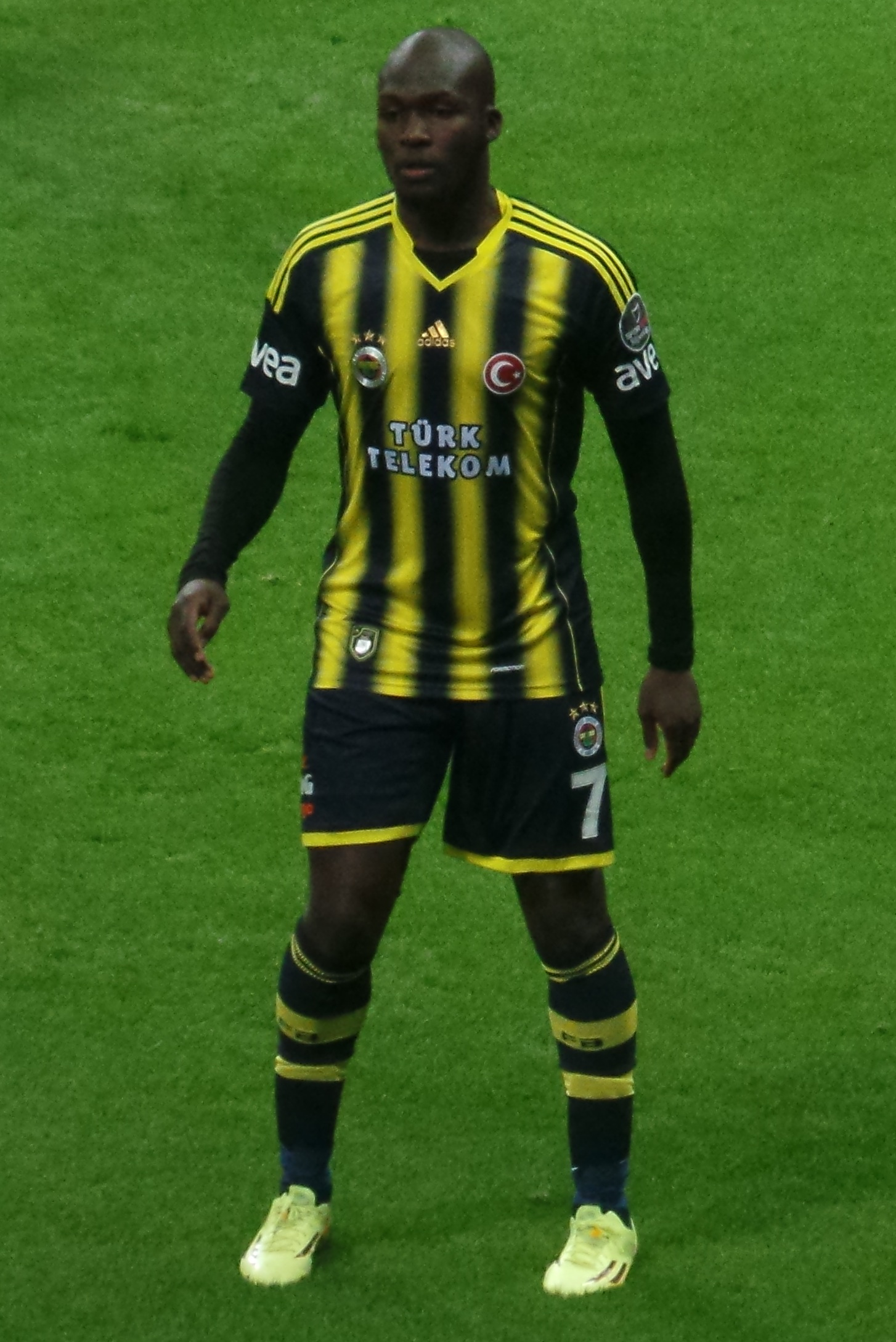
Moussa Sow
(2012–2015)
(2016–2017)

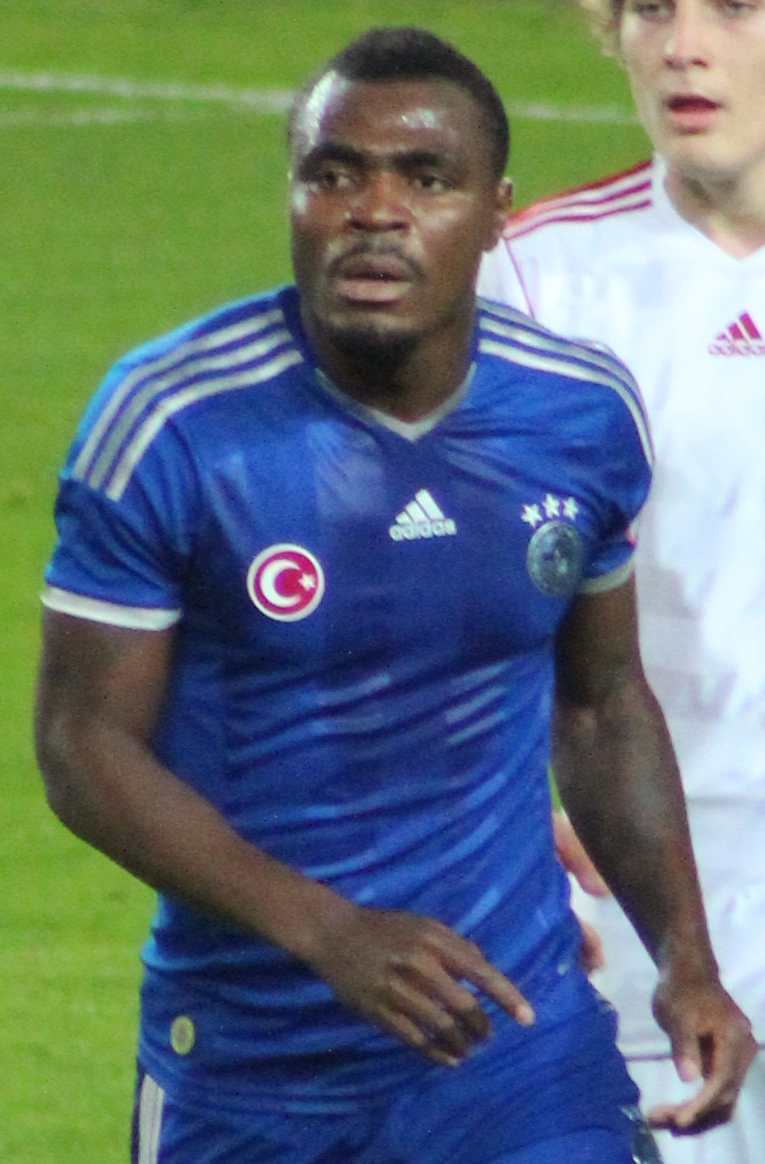
Emmanuel Emenike
(2013–2015)
(2016–2017)

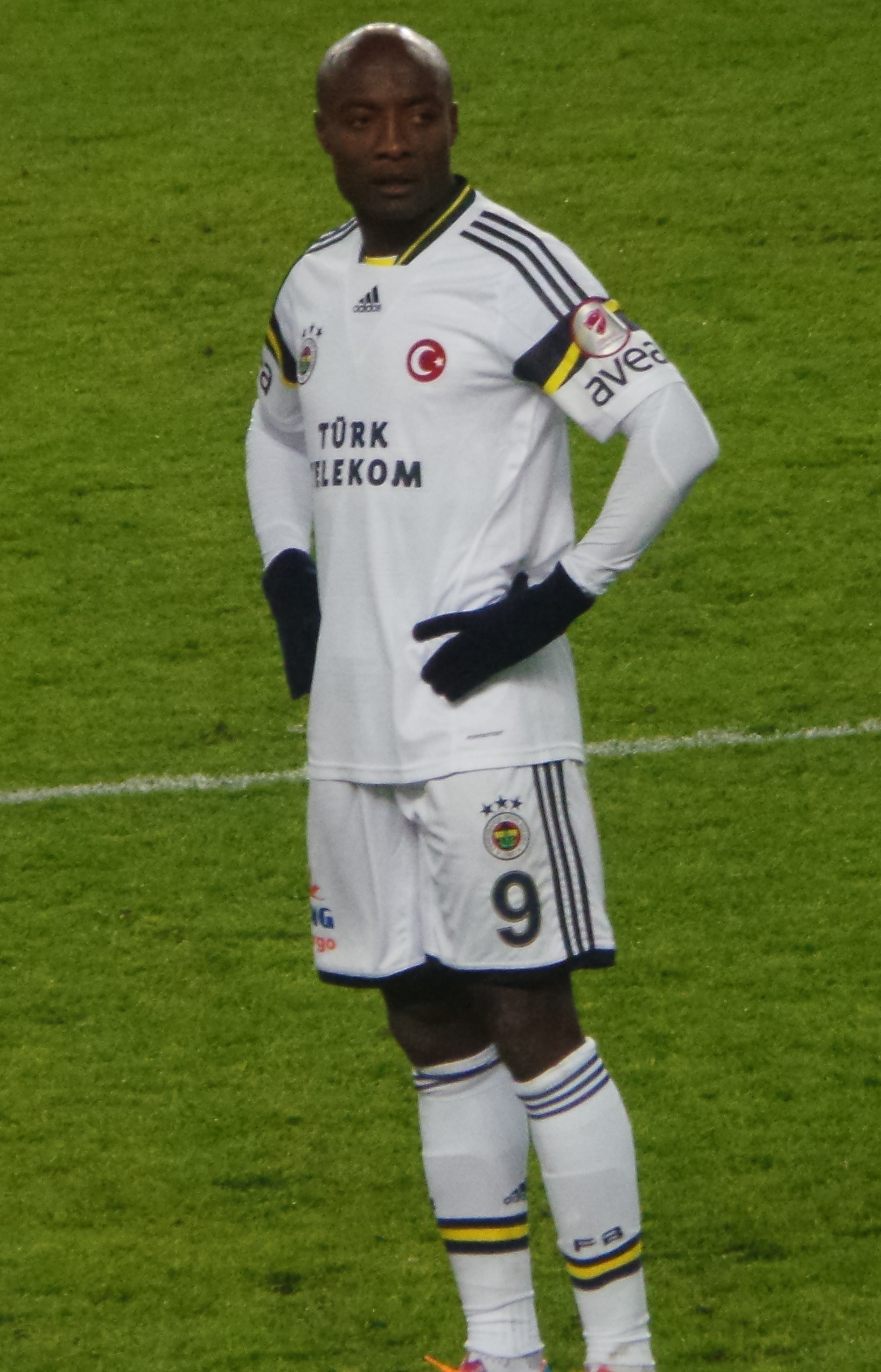
Pierre Webó
(2013–2015)

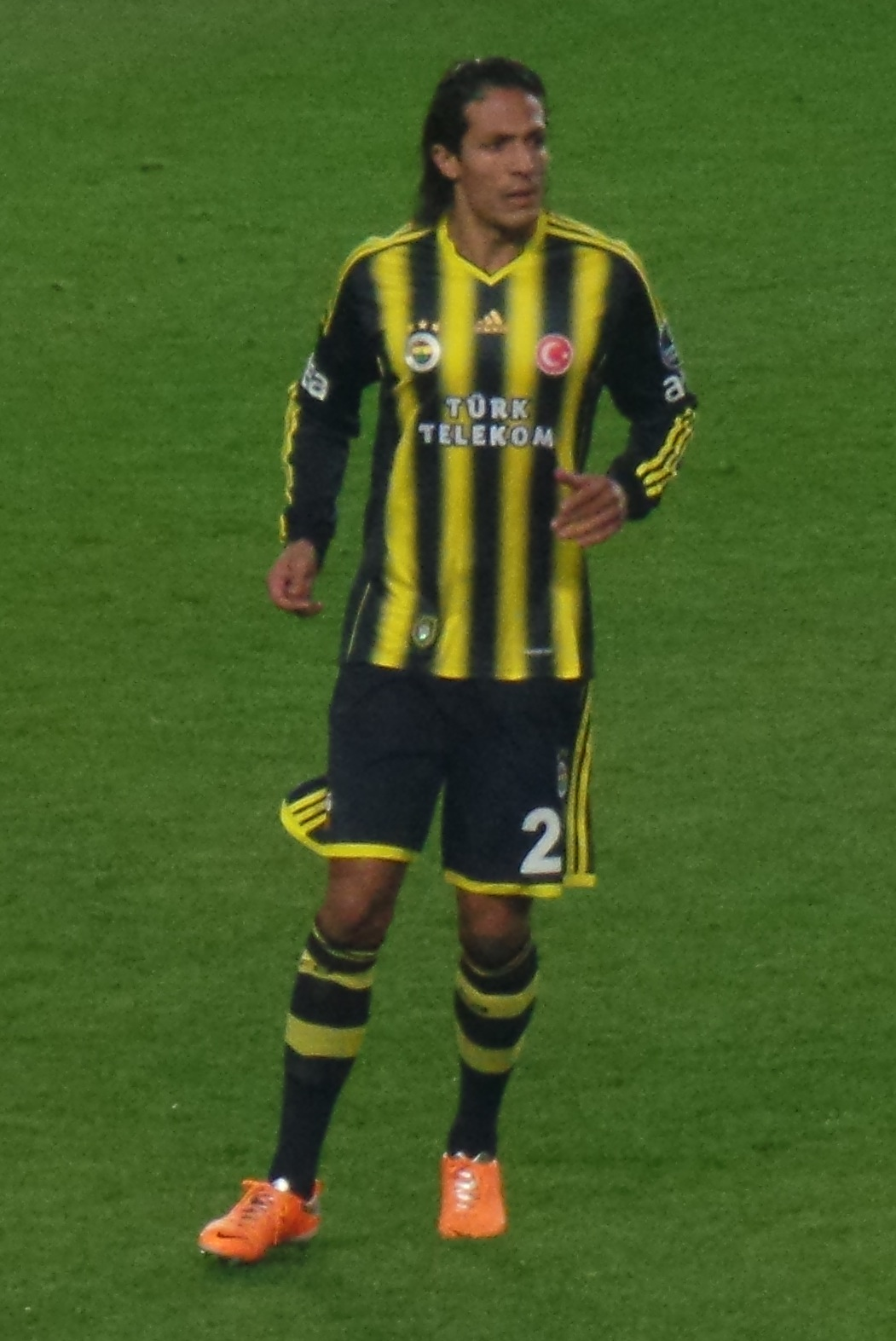
Bruno Alves
(2013–2016)

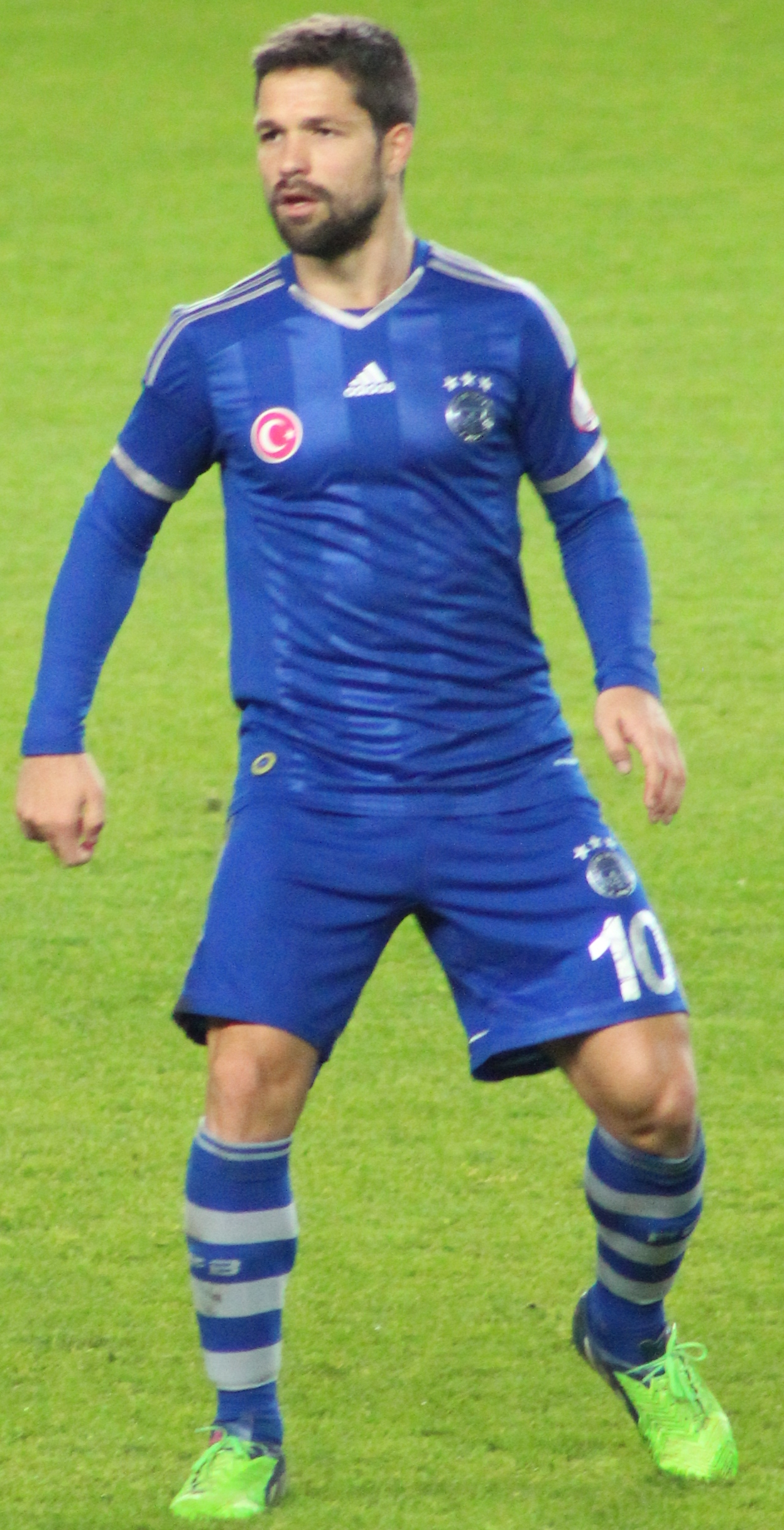
Diego
(2014–2016)

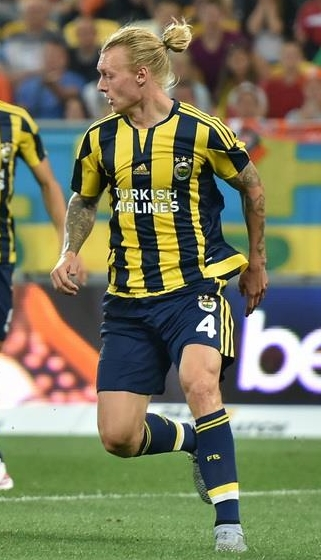
Simon Kjær
(2015–2017)

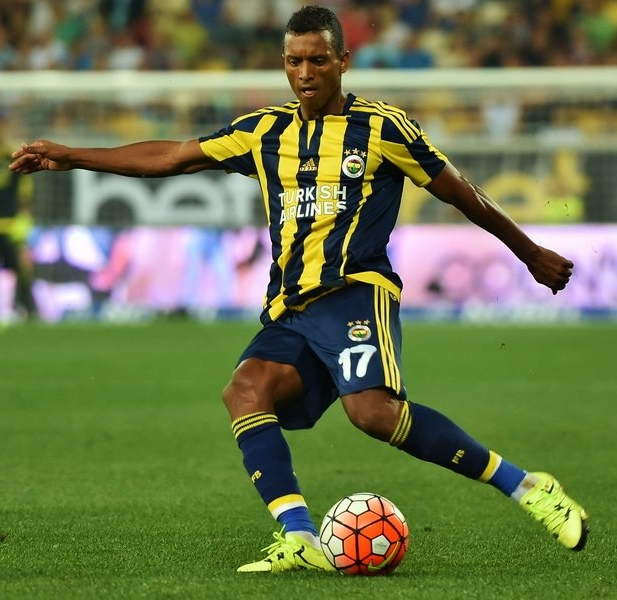
Nani
(2015–2016)

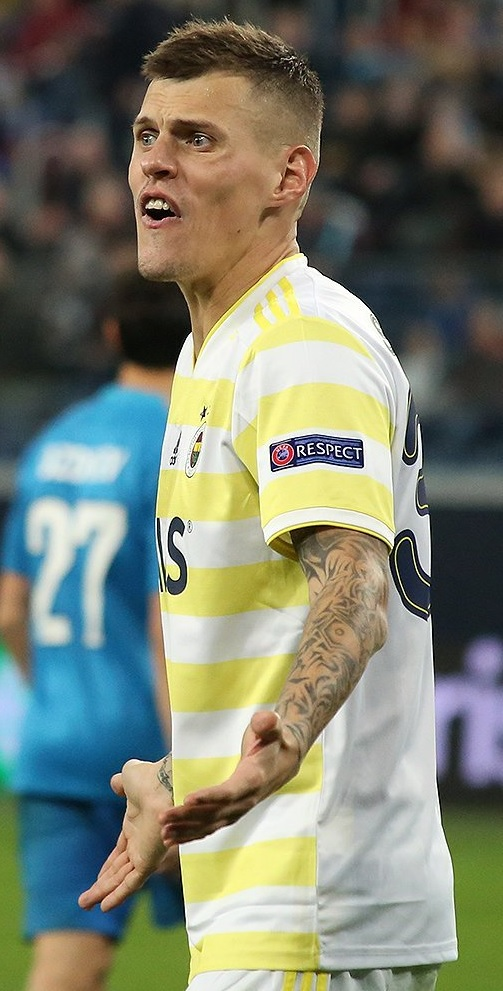
Martin Škrtel
(2016–2019)

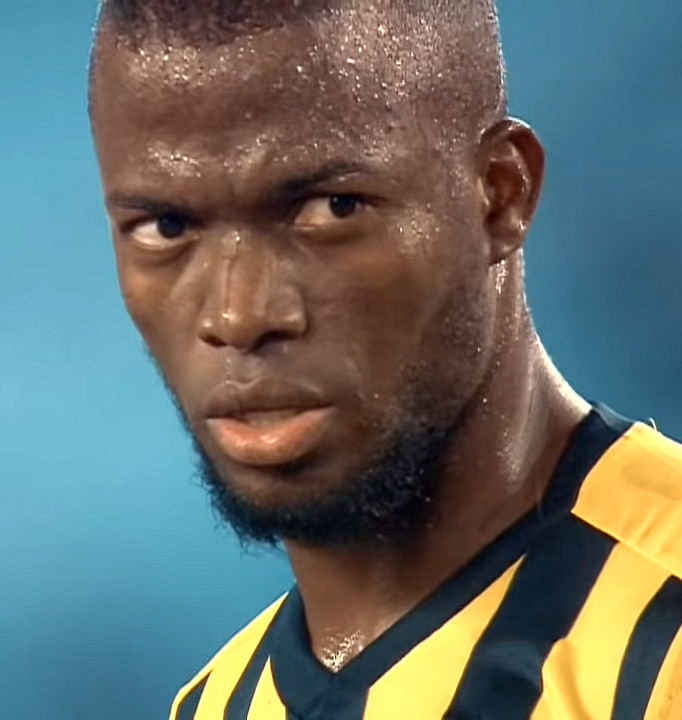
Enner Valencia
(2020-2023)

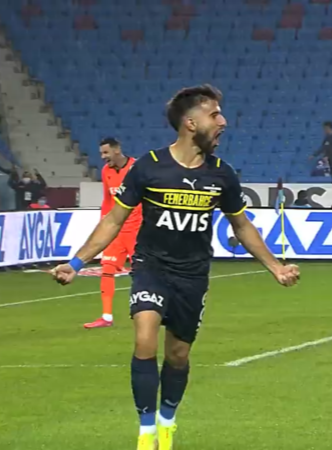
Diego Rossi
(2021-2023)

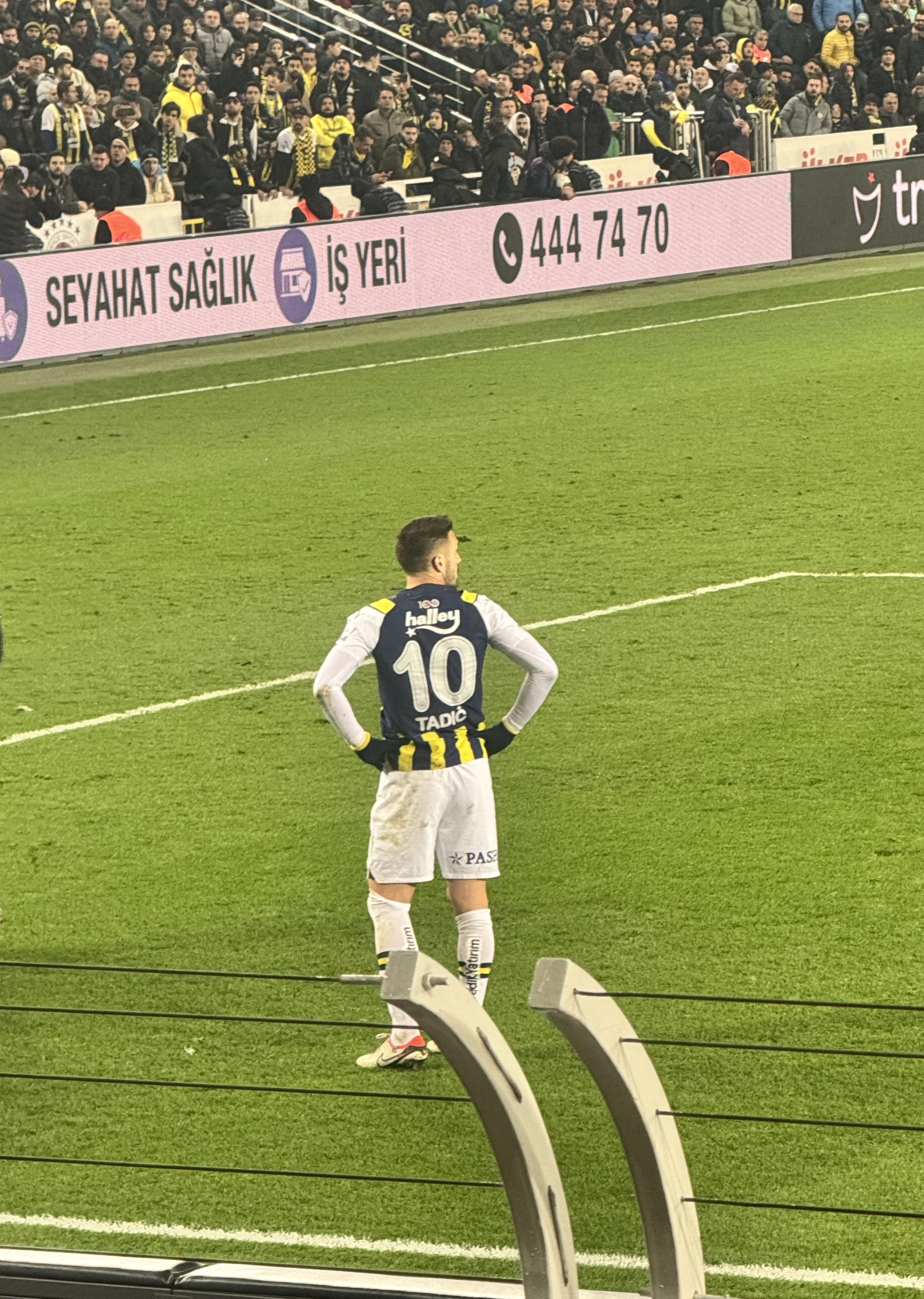
Dušan Tadić
(2023-2025)

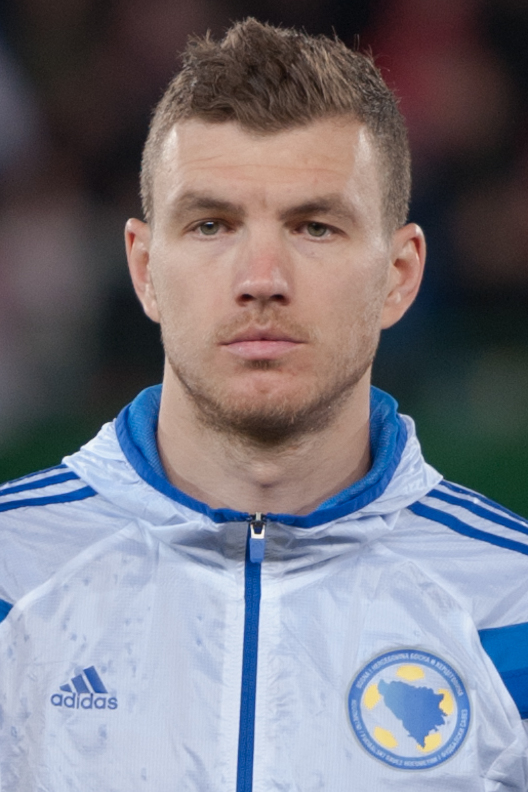
Edin Džeko
(2023-2025)

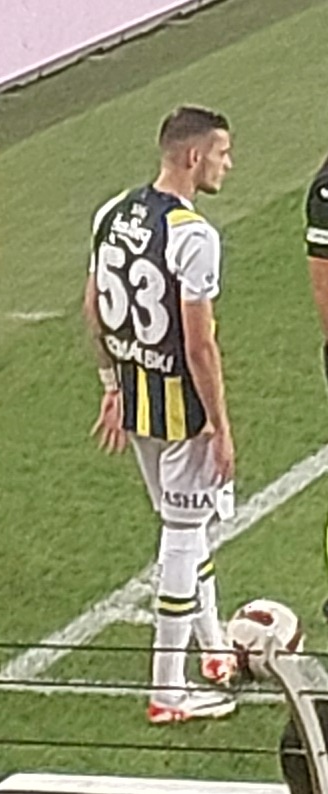
Sebastian Szymański
(2023–2026)

Fred
(2023–2026)

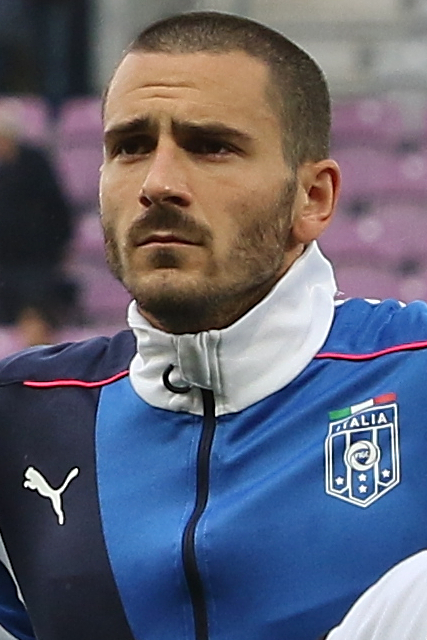
Leonardo Bonucci
(2024–2024)

Talisca
(2025-2026)

Milan Škriniar
(2025-...)

Marco Asensio
(2025-...)

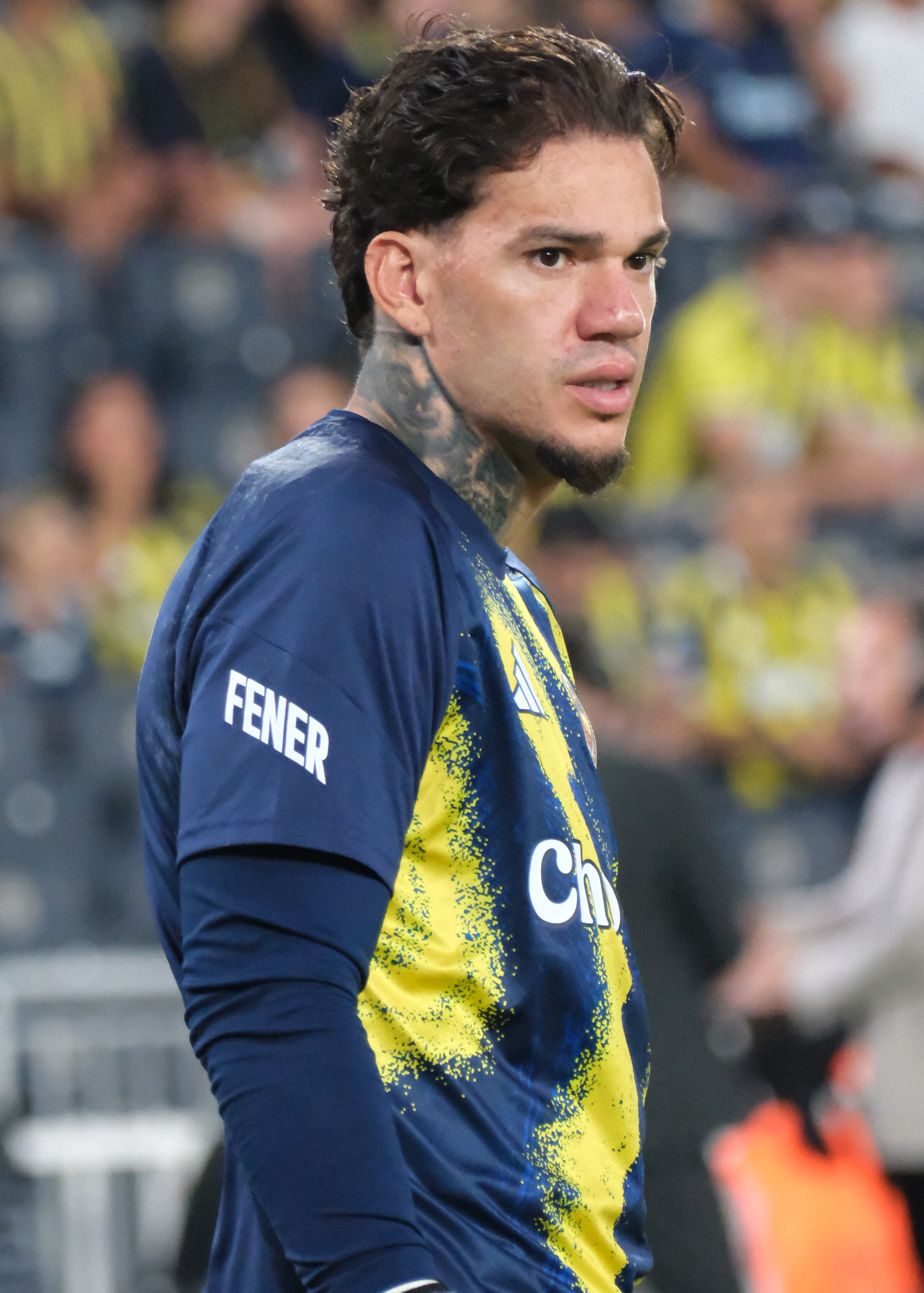
Ederson
(2025-...)

Nélson Semedo
(2025-...)

Mattéo Guendouzi
(2026-...)

Vedat Muriqi
(2019–2020)
(2026–...)

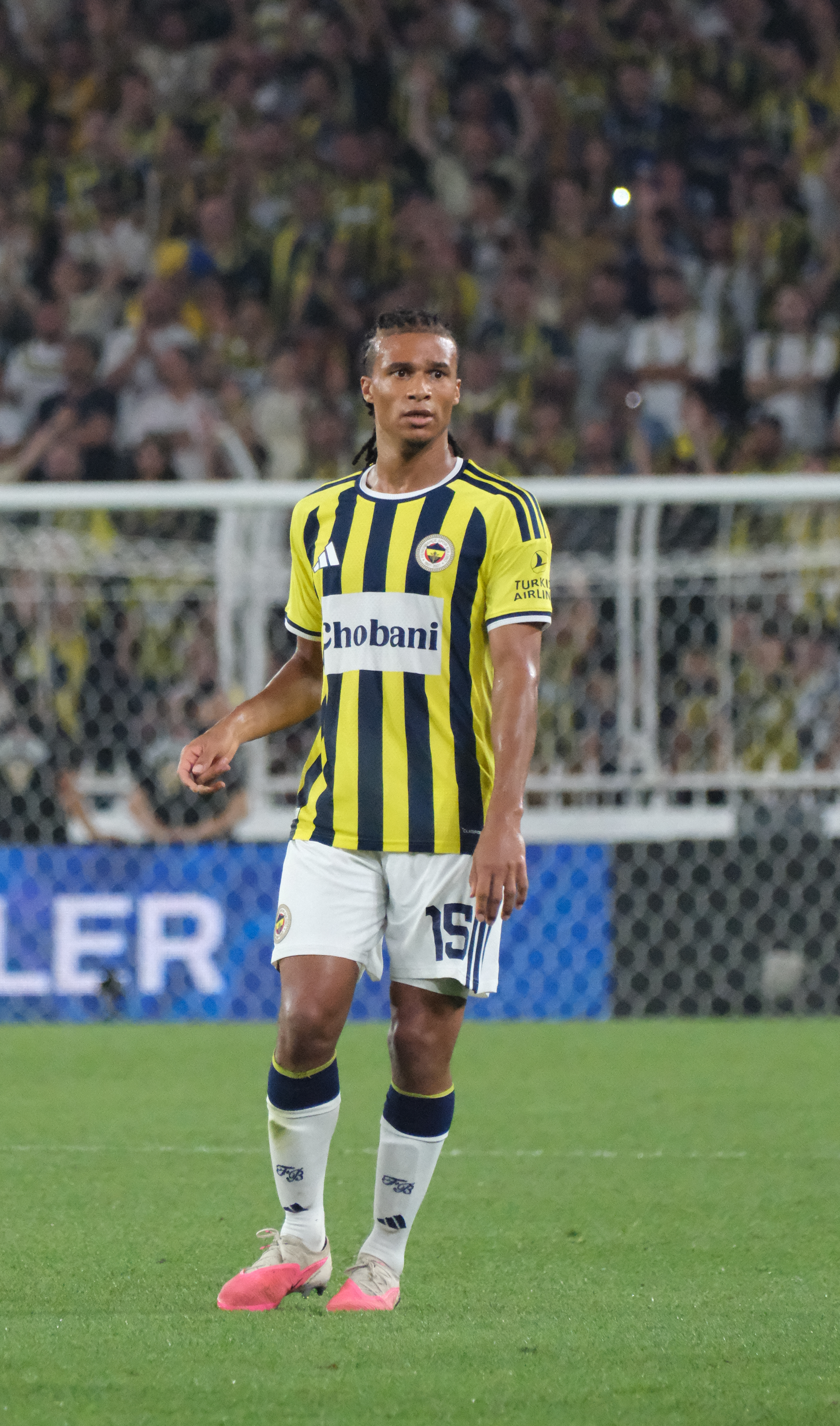
Nathan Aké
(2026-...)

Mason Greenwood
(2026-...)

Romelu Lukaku
(2026-...)

== See also ==
- List of Fenerbahçe S.K. footballers
- List of Fenerbahçe S.K. football captains
