= Mehmet Ali Has =

Turkish footballer

Personal information
- Date of birth: January 1, 1927
- Place of birth: Istanbul, Turkey
- Date of death: 28 March 1982 (aged 55)
- Place of death: New York City, United States
- Height: 1.82 m (6 ft 0 in)
- Position: Forward

Senior career*
Years	Team	Apps	(Gls)
1942–1946	Beykoz	54	(19)
1946–1947	Fenerbahçe	5	(2)
1947–1949	Beykoz	17	(3)
1949–1956	Fenerbahçe	98	(16)
1956–1958	Beykoz	30	(9)
1958–1961	Alibeyköy S.K.	47	(3)
1961–1962	Feriköy S.K.	6	(2)

International career^{‡}
1951–1952	Turkey U18	4	(0)
1950–1957	Turkey	18	(1)
- * Club domestic league appearances and goals as of 13 January 2018 ‡ National team caps and goals as of 13 January 2018

Mehmet Ali Has (1 January 1927 – 28 March 1982) was a Turkish footballer who played as a forward and was best known for his stints at Fenerbahçe and Beykoz in the Turkish Süper Lig. He was nicknamed Tarzan Mehmet Ali because of his long hair.

== Personal life ==
Has' brother, Şeref Has, was also a Turkish professional footballer.
