= Abdullah Çevrim =

Turkish footballer (1941–2019)

Personal information
- Date of birth: 20 July 1941
- Date of death: 19 February 2019 (aged 77)
- Place of death: Fethiye, Turkey
- Position: Midfielder

Youth career
- Kuleli Military High School

Senior career*
Years	Team	Apps	(Gls)
- Harbiye
1961-1966	Gençlerbirliği	138	(41)
1966-1970	Fenerbahçe	106	(23)
1970-1972	MKE Ankaragücü		(6)
- Gaziantepspor

International career
	Turkey MNT	6	
- * Club domestic league appearances and goals

Abdullah Çevrim (20 July 1941 – 19 February 2019) was a Turkish footballer who played as a forward for Gençlerbirliği, Fenerbahçe, MKE Ankaragücü and Gaziantepspor.

He graduated in Kuleli Military High School where he played in sports, he started his football career with Harbiye SK (Militarty Sport Club) and then transferred to Gençlerbirliği where he scored 41 goals in 138 matches between 1961 and 1966.

He transferred to Fenerbahçe SK and played there four years between 1966 and 1970. He scored 23 goals in 106 matches and won the 1967–8 and 1969–70 Turkish League titles also won 1966-67 Balkan Cup. He played six times for the Turkey national team.

He transferred to MKE Ankaragücü and played with them between 1970 and 1972 and won the Turkish Cup with them in the 1971–72 season.

He died in Fethiye on 19 February 2019 of a heart attack.
