= Şevkati Hulusi Bey =

Turkish footballer

Şevkati Hulusi Bey (born 1894, Kadıköy, Istanbul – died 1950, Istanbul) was a Turkish football player and one of the founders of Fenerbahçe Sports Club in 1907.
