= Ziya Şengül =

Turkish footballer (1944–2023)

Ziya Şengül (1 July 1944 – 26 February 2023) was a Turkish footballer who played as a midfielder. He is remembered for his commanding role during his career at Turkish club Fenerbahçe and also for his great effort at the famous draw of the Turkey national team against Italy.

Şengül made 21 appearances for the Turkey between 1964 and 1975.

Şengül died from organ failure on 26 February 2023. He was buried at Aşiyan Asri Cemetery.
