= Necip Okaner =

Turkish navy officer, footballer and academician

Necip Enver Okaner
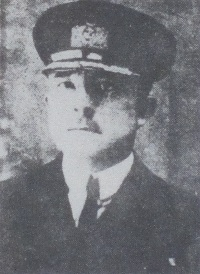

Personal information
- Full name: Samipaşazade Necip Enver
- Date of birth: 1889
- Place of birth: Kadıköy, Istanbul, Ottoman Empire
- Date of death: 28 July 1959 (aged 69–70)
- Place of death: İzmir, Turkey
- Position: Defender

Senior career*
Years	Team	Apps	(Gls)
- Fenerbahçe SK

Managerial career
- Fenerbahçe SK
Education	Naval Academy (Turkey)
- * Club domestic league appearances and goals

Necip Okaner (1889 – 28 July 1959) was a Turkish navy officer, footballer and academician. He was among the principal founders of the major Turkish multi-sport club Fenerbahçe SK.

Necip Okaner, Ziya Songülen and Ayetullah Bey met at Okaner's residence, which was located at Beşbıyık street in the Moda, Kadıköy quarter, where the club was officially founded as Fenerbahçe Futbol Kulübü (Fenerbahçe Football Club).

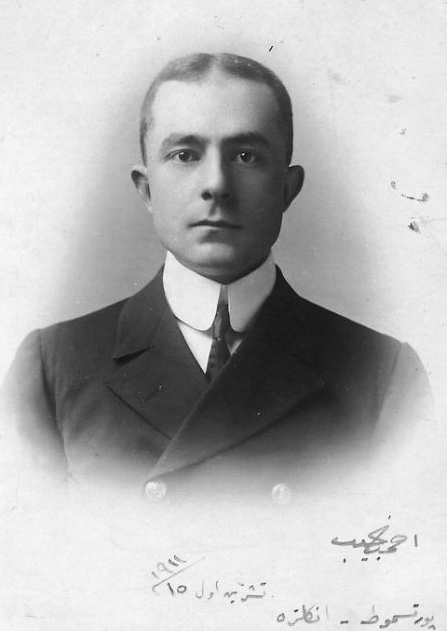
Necip Okaner in 1911

Necip Okaner, in 1907 graduated from the Naval Academy (Turkey) and became a marine lieutenant. In 1909 he was promoted to the rank of lieutenant and brought to the Naval Forces. In 1912–1913, he took torpedo training in the Royal Navy. When he returned to Istanbul, he was promoted to the rank of captain. In 1914–1916 he worked as a mine teacher. In 1916, he studied for six weeks at the Imperial German Navy

Necip Bey, after resigning from the army; was an English professor at Ege University School of Foreign Languages. He died on 28 July 1959. He was buried in Kokluca Cemetery in Bornova, İzmir Province.
