= Asaf Beşpınar =

Turkish footballer and engineer (1887–1946)

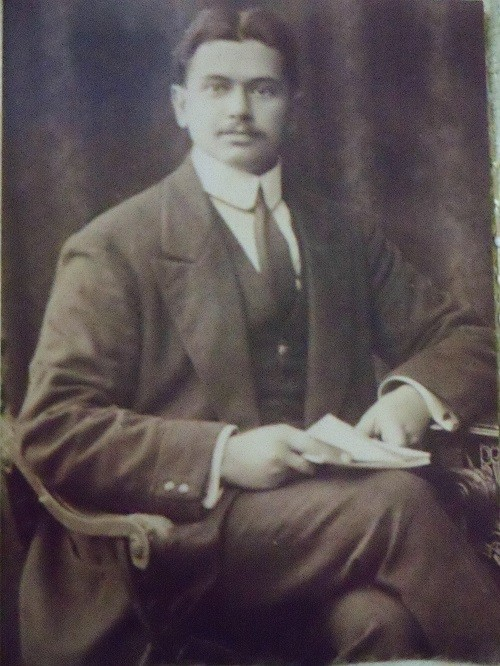

Asaf Beşpınar (25 September 1887, Punjab – 26 May 1946, Istanbul) was an Indian-Turkish footballer and engineer. He was among the founding line-up of the Turkish football club Fenerbahçe.

Beşpınar, being an alumnus of Saint Joseph's College in Istanbul, had close ties with other founding members of the club, who studied at the same school.
