= Hassan Sami Kocamemi =

Turkish footballer

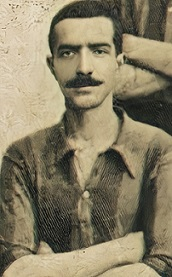
Hassan Sami Kocamemi

Hassan Sami Kocamemi (Kadıköy, Istanbul – Istanbul) was a Turkish footballer, who played as a defender. He was among the founding line-up of the Turkish football club Fenerbahçe.
