= Ziya Songülen =

Turkish footballer

Nurizade Ziya Songülen
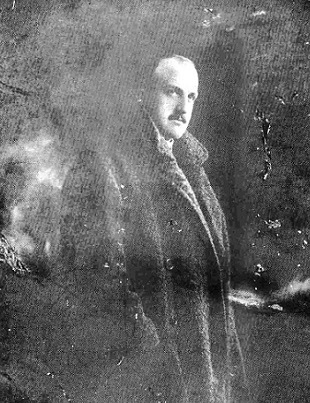

Personal information
- Full name: Mehmed Ziya Songülen
- Date of birth: 9 September 1886
- Place of birth: Istanbul, Ottoman Empire
- Date of death: 21 August 1936 (aged 49)
- Place of death: Buried in Aşiyan Asri Cemetery, Istanbul, Turkey
- Position: Defender

Senior career*
Years	Team	Apps	(Gls)
1907-1908	Fenerbahçe		

Managerial career
- 1907-1908: Fenerbahçe
Education	Lycée Saint-Joseph, Istanbul
- * Club domestic league appearances and goals

Nurizade Ziya Songülen (9 September 1886 – 21 August 1936) was a great-grandson of Damat Gürcü Halil Rifat Pasha and his second wife Saliha Sultan, an Ottoman princess. His parents were Azize Hanim and Hariciyeci Suad Bey. He was the founder and first president of the major Turkish multi-sport club Fenerbahçe SK, between 1907–08. Ziya Songülen also played as a right back for the club. He graduated from Saint Joseph's College in 1903.

He witnessed football for the first time during his higher education in England and got the idea of forming a football team in his country. When he returned to his country after completing his education in England in 1906, he first contacted his friends and his literature teacher Enver Yetiker at Saint-Joseph’s College, the school he graduated from. The prototype of the Fenerbahçe football team was formed in June 1906, but due to concerns about Turkish youth playing football during the reign of Abdulhamid II, the process of forming a football team could only be completed in the spring of 1907. Because, it took a long time to complete the 11 football players who would play for this football team. Nurizade Ziya Bey had obtained Fenerbahçe’s first kits from the shop of Frank Sugg, a famous sports goods merchant of the time, located in the Lord Street district of Liverpool, England. Fenerbahçe's first kits that came from England were made of flannel fabric, yellow and white striped, long-sleeved and winter-ready. The kits were causing problems for the players as the weather got hotter in the following days. For this reason, the club’s president Nurizade Ziya Bey went to the shop of Baker, an English merchant who sold sports goods, located in the Tünel district of Beyoğlu, Istanbul, in 1908 to order summer kits for the team. Baker said that the jerseys to be ordered would not be delivered this year. Thereupon, he offered to give Ziya Bey the yellow-navy striped summer shirts he had. Accepting this offer, Nurizade Ziya Bey purchased all the jerseys from Baker in Istanbul and decided that the team’s colors would be yellow-navy. And with this decision taken in 1908, the colors of Fenerbahçe that will remain until today were determined.

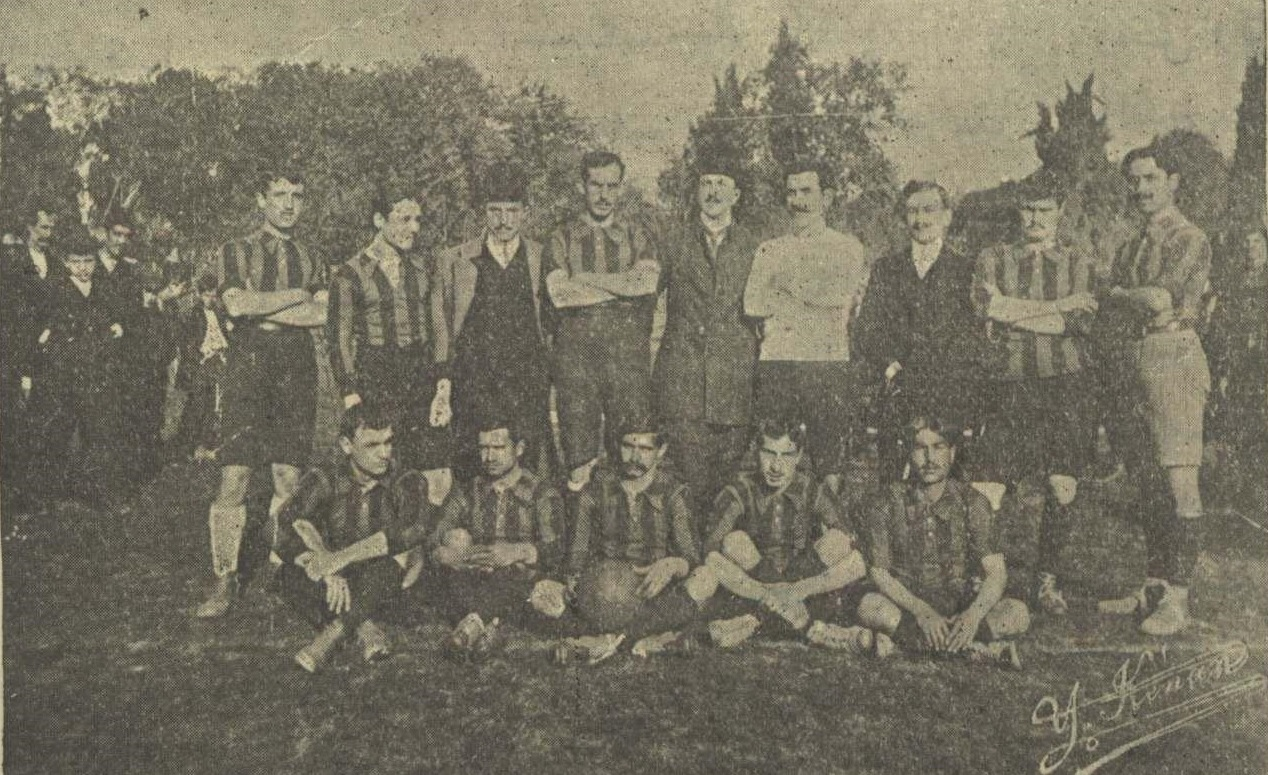
A team photo including Ziya Bey during Fenerbahçe's match against HMS Barham on November 8, 1908 (He is the fourth from the left standing)

During his student years, Ziya Bey was impressed by the marches composed for football clubs in England and this inspired an idea. He made an agreement with Ottoman citizen musician Krikor Sinanian, who composed marches to order in Istanbul, and presented this march, the notes of which have survived to the present day, to Fenerbahçe in 1908. The march in question has the distinction of being the first march composed for a team in Turkish football history. He bought the ground where the current Şükrü Saracoğlu Stadium is located (then named Papazın Çayırı) for 17 Ottoman gold coins.
