= Ayetullah Bey =

Turkish footballer (1888–1919)

Şevkipaşazade Ayetullah Bey
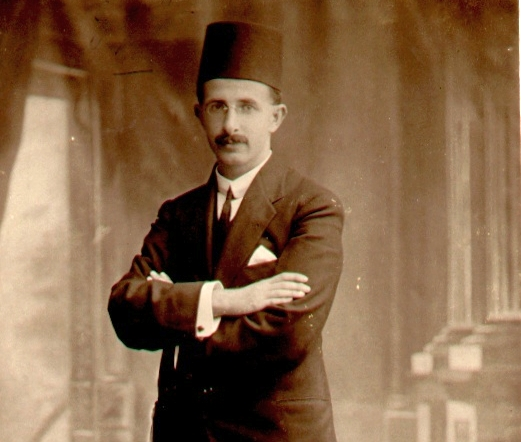
- Ayetullah Bey

Personal information
- Full name: Şevkipaşazade Ayetullah Bey
- Date of birth: 1888
- Place of birth: Kadıköy, Istanbul, Ottoman Empire
- Date of death: 1919 (aged 30–31)
- Place of death: Istanbul, Ottoman Empire
- Position: Goalkeeper

Senior career*
Years	Team	Apps	(Gls)
- Fenerbahçe

Managerial career
- 1908–1909: Fenerbahçe S.K.
Education	Lycée Saint-Joseph, Istanbul
- * Club domestic league appearances and goals

Şevkipaşazade Ayetullah Bey (Adyghe: Андзорыкъу Щэукъиыкъо Аетулахь; 1888–1919), was an Ottoman footballer of Circassian descent. He was the founder and second president of the major Turkish multi-sport club Fenerbahçe S.K. between 1908 and 1909.

== Biography ==
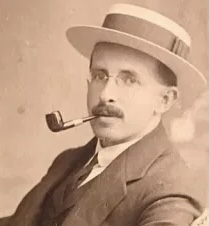
Ayetullah Bey

Ayetullah Bey became the first secretary general when he was just 22. In addition, he served the club as a goalkeeper and defender. Ayetullah Bey, graduated from Lycée Saint-Joseph. Of Circassian origin, he descended from the Ubykh-Kabardian tribes and the "Anzork" (Андзорыкъу) family. According to Fenerbahçe congress member and a family friend of Ayetullah Bey's sister, the family was of Circassian origin and had served as bureucrats for the Ottoman Empire.

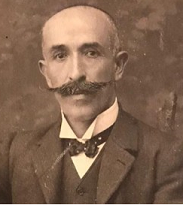
Şevki Pasha Anzork, Ayetullah Bey's father

Ayetullah Bey's father was Şevki Pasha, a brigadier general in the Ottoman Army. Ayetullah Bey was known as "Şevkipaşazade", literally meaning "Shevki Pasha's son". After graduating from Lycée Saint-Joseph he started to work as a civil servant in the Ottoman Bank. He then resigned and founded a company that sells water. He was a member of the first squads of Fenerbahçe, playing as the goalkeeper. Later, he also served the club as a president. He died in 1919 in Istanbul. He was buried in Karacaahmet Cemetery, Istanbul.
