= 2013–14 Trabzonspor season =

Trabzonspor
2013–14 season
- President: İbrahim Hacıosmanoğlu
- Manager: Mustafa Reşit Akçay; Hami Mandıralı
- Stadium: Hüseyin Avni Aker
- Süper Lig: 4th
- Turkish Cup: Fourth round
- UEFA Europa League: Round of 32
- Top goalscorer: League: Paulo Henrique (13); All: Paulo Henrique (21)
Home colours	Away colours	Third colours

The 2013–14 Trabzonspor season was the club's 39th consecutive season in the Süper Lig.

== Squad ==
Note: Flags indicate national team as defined under FIFA eligibility rules; some limited exceptions apply. Players may hold more than one non-FIFA nationality.

No.	Pos.	Nation	Player
1	GK	TUR	Onur Kıvrak (Captain)
3	DF	POR	José Bosingwa
4	DF	TUR	Aykut Demir
6	DF	CIV	Sol Bamba
8	MF	TUR	Soner Aydoğdu
9	FW	TUR	Emre Güral
10	MF	POL	Adrian Mierzejewski
11	FW	TUR	Şahin Aygüneş
12	FW	BRA	Paulo Henrique
15	MF	FRA	Florent Malouda
19	MF	TUR	Abdulkadir Özdemir
20	MF	ARG	Gustavo Colman
21	MF	TUR	Özer Hurmacı (on loan from Kasımpaşa SK)

No.	Pos.	Nation	Player
22	DF	TUR	Mustafa Yumlu
26	GK	TUR	Fatih Öztürk
29	MF	TUR	Olcan Adın
32	MF	TUR	Yusuf Erdoğan (on loan from 1461 Trabzon)
33	DF	TUR	Mustafa Akbaş
55	MF	ROU	Alexandru Bourceanu
61	DF	TUR	Zeki Yavru
83	FW	AUT	Marc Janko
88	DF	TUR	Caner Osmanpaşa
89	GK	TUR	Zeki Ayvaz
90	MF	TUR	Gökhan Alsan
99	DF	TUR	Kadir Keleş

=== Out on loan ===
Note: Flags indicate national team as defined under FIFA eligibility rules; some limited exceptions apply. Players may hold more than one non-FIFA nationality.

No.	Pos.	Nation	Player
—	GK	TUR	Bora Sevim (at 1461 Trabzon until 30 June 2014)
—	DF	CZE	Ondřej Čelůstka (at Sunderland)
—	DF	TUR	Göksu Alhas (at 1461 Trabzon until 30 June 2014)
—	DF	TUR	Abdullah Karmil (at Ankaraspor until 30 June 2014)
—	DF	TUR	Mehmet Kuruoğlu (at 1461 Trabzon until 30 June 2014)
—	DF	TUR	Oğulcan Gökce (at 1461 Trabzon until 30 June 2014)
—	DF	TUR	Alim Öztürk (at 1461 Trabzon until 30 June 2014)
—	DF	TUR	Sefa Akın Başıbüyük (at 1461 Trabzon until 30 June 2014)

No.	Pos.	Nation	Player
—	DF	TUR	Uğur Dündar (at 1461 Trabzon until 30 June 2014)
—	MF	TUR	Abdulkadir Parmak (at 1461 Trabzon)
—	MF	TUR	Tevfik Şanver (at 1461 Trabzon)
—	MF	GHA	Torric Jebrin (at 1461 Trabzon until 30 June 2014)
—	MF	TUR	Barış Memiş (at 1461 Trabzon until 30 June 2014)
—	MF	TUR	Batuhan Artarslan (at 1461 Trabzon until 30 June 2014)
—	FW	TUR	Mert Yomralıoğlu (at 1461 Trabzon)
—	FW	TUR	Hüseyin Yahyaoğlu (at 1461 Trabzon until 30 June 2014)

== Transfers ==
=== Summer ===
In: Note: Flags indicate national team as defined under FIFA eligibility rules; some limited exceptions apply. Players may hold more than one non-FIFA nationality.

No.	Pos.	Nation	Player
3	DF	POR	José Bosingwa (from (England) Queens Park Rangers)
4	DF	TUR	Aykut Demir (from (Turkey) Gençlerbirliği)
15	MF	FRA	Florent Malouda (from (England) Chelsea)
17	FW	TUR	Batuhan Karadeniz (from (Turkey) Eskişehirspor)
19	MF	TUR	Abdulkadir Özdemir (from (Turkey) 1461 Trabzon)
26	GK	TUR	Fatih Öztürk (from (Turkey) 1461 Trabzon)
32	MF	TUR	Yusuf Erdoğan (loan from (Turkey) 1461 Trabzon)
88	DF	TUR	Caner Osmanpaşa (from (Turkey) 1461 Trabzon)
99	DF	TUR	Kadir Keleş (from (Turkey) 1461 Trabzon)
—	DF	TUR	Abdullah Karmil (from (Turkey) 1461 Trabzon)

Out: Note: Flags indicate national team as defined under FIFA eligibility rules; some limited exceptions apply. Players may hold more than one non-FIFA nationality.

No.	Pos.	Nation	Player
5	DF	SVK	Marek Čech (to (Italy) Bologna)
11	MF	TUR	Yasin Öztekin (to (Turkey) Kayseri Erciyesspor)
21	FW	TUR	Halil Altıntop (to (Germany) Augsburg)
27	MF	SVK	Marek Sapara
28	DF	CZE	Ondřej Čelůstka (loan to (England) Sunderland)
29	GK	TUR	Tolga Zengin (to (Turkey) Beşiktaş)
30	MF	TUR	Serkan Balcı (to (Turkey) Antalyaspor)
86	DF	BRA	Emerson (to (France) Rennes)
—	GK	TUR	Bora Sevim (loan to (Turkey) 1461 Trabzon)
—	DF	TUR	Abdullah Karmil (loan to (Turkey) Ankaraspor)
—	DF	TUR	Alim Öztürk (loan to (Turkey) 1461 Trabzon)
—	DF	TUR	Göksu Alhas (loan to (Turkey) 1461 Trabzon)
—	DF	TUR	Mehmet Kuruoğlu (loan to (Turkey) 1461 Trabzon)
—	DF	TUR	Oğulcan Gökce (loan to (Turkey) 1461 Trabzon)
—	DF	TUR	Sefa Akın Başıbüyük (loan to (Turkey) 1461 Trabzon)
—	DF	TUR	Uğur Dündar (loan to (Turkey) 1461 Trabzon)
—	MF	TUR	Abdulkadir Parmak (loan to (Turkey) 1461 Trabzon)
—	MF	TUR	Tevfik Şanver (loan to (Turkey) 1461 Trabzon)
—	MF	GHA	Torric Jebrin (loan to (Turkey) 1461 Trabzon)
—	MF	TUR	Barış Memiş (loan to (Turkey) 1461 Trabzon)
—	MF	TUR	Batuhan Artarslan (loan to (Turkey) 1461 Trabzon)
—	FW	TUR	Mert Yomralıoğlu (loan to (Turkey) 1461 Trabzon)
—	FW	TUR	Hüseyin Yahyaoğlu (loan to (Turkey) 1461 Trabzon)

=== Winter ===
In: Note: Flags indicate national team as defined under FIFA eligibility rules; some limited exceptions apply. Players may hold more than one non-FIFA nationality.

No.	Pos.	Nation	Player
11	FW	TUR	Şahin Aygüneş (from (Turkey) Kasımpaşa)
21	MF	TUR	Özer Hurmacı (loan from (Turkey) Kasımpaşa)
33	DF	TUR	Mustafa Akbaş (from (Turkey) 1461 Trabzon)
55	MF	ROU	Alexandru Bourceanu (from (Romania) Steaua București)
90	MF	TUR	Gökhan Alsan (from (Turkey) 1461 Trabzon)

Out: Note: Flags indicate national team as defined under FIFA eligibility rules; some limited exceptions apply. Players may hold more than one non-FIFA nationality.

No.	Pos.	Nation	Player
5	MF	CIV	Didier Zokora
7	MF	TUR	Volkan Şen (to (Turkey) Bursaspor)
17	FW	TUR	Batuhan Karadeniz (loan to (Turkey) Elazığspor)
18	MF	TUR	Aykut Akgün (loan to (Turkey) Çaykur Rizespor)
23	DF	TUR	Giray Kaçar (to (Turkey) Çaykur Rizespor)
25	MF	BRA	Alanzinho

== Competitions ==
=== Süper Lig ===
==== Results ====
18 August 2013 1	Beşiktaş	2 – 0	Trabzonspor	Istanbul
21:45 EEST (UTC+3)	Şahan 75'; Töre 82'; Kurtuluş (yellow card) 86'; Gülüm (yellow card) 90+1'	Report	Colman (yellow card) 24'; Alanzinho (yellow card) 52'; Demir (yellow card) 71'; Akgün (yellow card) 84'	Stadium: Atatürk Olympic Stadium; Referee: Halis Özkahya

26 August 2013 2	Trabzonspor	2 – 1	Çaykur Rizespor	Trabzon
20:00 EEST (UTC+3)	Mierzejewski 3'; Malouda 49'; Zokora (yellow card) 54'; Colman (yellow card) 85'	Report	Özmen (yellow card) 19'; Köse 40'; Karakaş (yellow card) 83'; Kaya (yellow card) 90+4'	Stadium: Hüseyin Avni Aker Stadium; Referee: Bülent Yildirim

1 September 2013 3	Akhisar Belediyespor	3 – 0	Trabzonspor	Manisa
21:45 EEST (UTC+3)	Mezenga 11'; Niasse 63'; Demirok (yellow card) 67'; Özer 89'	Report	Kıvrak (yellow card) 45+2'; Yavru (yellow card) 51'; Colman (yellow card) 69'; Yumlu (yellow card) 79'	Stadium: 19.Mayis Stadion; Referee: Mete Kalkavan

14 September 2013 4	Trabzonspor	1 – 0	Karabükspor	Trabzon
20:30 EEST (UTC+3)	Malouda (yellow card) 69'; Henrique 76'; Zokora (yellow card) 90'	Report	Parlak (yellow card) 50'; Özek (yellow card) 57'; Incedemir (yellow card) 67'; Özçal (yellow card) 81'; Uçar (yellow card) 86'; Pedersen (yellow card) 87'	Stadium: Hüseyin Avni Aker Stadium; Referee: Serkan Cinar

23 September 2013 5	Kayserispor	0 – 1	Trabzonspor	Kayseri
20:00 EEST (UTC+3)	Sereno (yellow card) 10'; Cleyton (yellow card) 36'	Summary	Bosingwa (yellow card) 20'; Demir (yellow card) 42'; Henrique 61'; Zokora (yellow card) 67'; Yavru (yellow card) 85'	Stadium: Kadir Has Stadium; Referee: Suleyman Abay

29 September 2013 6	Trabzonspor	2 – 0	Torku Konyaspor	Trabzon
16:00 EEST (UTC+3)	Demir (yellow card) 28'; Yumlu 56', 71'; Mierzejewski (yellow card) 58'; Janko (yellow card) 81'	Summary	Ndouasel (yellow card) 55'; Kokalović (yellow card) 80'; Teber (yellow card) 90'	Stadium: Hüseyin Avni Aker Stadium; Referee: Özgür Yankaya

6 October 2013 7	Fenerbahçe	0 – 0	Trabzonspor	Istanbul
20:00 EEST (UTC+3)	Topal (yellow card) 30'; Potuk (yellow card) 51'; Erkin (yellow card) 90'	Summary	Erdoğan (yellow card) 28'; Kaçar (yellow card) 70'; Yumlu (yellow card) 90'	Stadium: Şükrü Saracoğlu Stadium; Referee: Hüseyin Göçek

20 October 2013 8	Trabzonspor	0 – 0	Sivasspor	Trabzon
16:00 EEST (UTC+3)	Yumlu (red card) 62'	Summary	Manuel da Costa (yellow card) 38'; Erdal (yellow card) 64'; Bekmezci (yellow card) 80'; Taoil (yellow card) 90+1'	Stadium: Hüseyin Avni Aker Stadium; Referee: Fırat Aydınus

28 October 2013 9	Kasımpaşa	3 – 2	Trabzonspor	Istanbul
20:00 EET (UTC+2)	Şeras 18' (yellow card) 90'; Donk (yellow card) 32'; Büyük 40'; Scarione 61'	Summary	Henrique 24'; Adın 68' (yellow card) 77'; Erdoğan (yellow card) 72'; Demir (yellow card) 76' (yellow-red card) 76'; Kıvrak (yellow card) 77'; Janko (yellow card) 89'	Stadium: Recep Tayyip Erdoğan Stadium; Referee: Özgür Yankaya

3 November 2013 10	Trabzonspor	4 – 0	Elazığspor	Trabzon
15:30 EET (UTC+2)	Erdoğan 27'; Henrique 58'; Malouda (yellow card) 60'; Adin 69'; Bosingwa (yellow card) 72'; Güral 79'	Summary	Birinci (yellow card) 89'; Bilica (yellow card) 90' (yellow-red card) 90+2'	Stadium: Hüseyin Avni Aker Stadium; Referee: Suleyman Abay

10 November 2013 11	Gençlerbirliği	3 – 2	Trabzonspor	Ankara
16:30 EET (UTC+2)	Çiftçi (yellow card) 16'; Gosso (yellow card) 26'; Petrović (yellow card) 35'; Durmaz (yellow card) 37' (goal) 80'; Bayrak (yellow card) 43'; Stancu 45'; Çalık 67'	Summary	Henrique 1'; Colman 34' (pen.); Demir (yellow card) 53'; Kaçar (yellow card) 62'; Bosingwa (red card) 90+2'	Stadium: Ankara 19 Mayıs Stadium; Referee: Tolga Ozkalfa

24 November 2013 12	Trabzonspor	1 – 0	Eskişehirspor	Trabzon
19:00 EET (UTC+2)	Henrique 74'; Malouda (yellow card) 90+4'	Summary		Stadium: Hüseyin Avni Aker Stadium; Referee: Yunus Yildirim

1 December 2013 13	Trabzonspor	3 – 1	Kayseri Erciyesspor	Trabzon
15:30 EET (UTC+2)	Malouda 15', 57'; Henrique (yellow card) 73'; Adın 81'; Keleş (yellow card) 86'	Summary	Mandjeck (yellow card) 26'; Öztürk (yellow card) 28'; Çürüksu (yellow card) 29'; Öztekin 59'	Stadium: Hüseyin Avni Aker Stadium; Referee: Mete Kalkavan

8 December 2013 14	Gaziantepspor	3 – 2	Trabzonspor	Gaziantep
19:00 EET (UTC+2)	Tosun 5', 31'; Stankevičius (yellow card) 22'; Medunjanin (yellow card) 57'; Has (yellow card) 57'; Traoré 64'	Summary	Bamba (yellow card) 35'; Özdemir (yellow card) 41'; Güral (yellow card) 41' (goal) 67'; Malouda 57' (pen.)	Stadium: Gaziantep Kamil Ocak Stadium; Referee: Ilker Meral

16 December 2013 15	Trabzonspor	2 – 2	Bursaspor	Trabzon
20:00 EET (UTC+2)	Akgün (yellow card) 15'; Erdoğan (yellow card) 26'; Bamba (yellow card) 31'; Malouda (yellow card) 38'; Adın 45'; Güral 90'	Summary	Henrique 27' (o.g.); Šesták (yellow card) 55' (goal) 61'	Stadium: Hüseyin Avni Aker Stadium; Referee: Halis Özkahya

22 December 2013 16	Galatasaray	2 – 1	Trabzonspor	Istanbul
20:00 EET (UTC+2)	Yilmaz 60', 68'; Riera (yellow card) 77'; Drogba (yellow card) 79'	Summary	Yumlu (yellow card) 45'; Zokora (yellow card) 64'; Adın 66'; Colman (red card) 77'	Stadium: Türk Telekom Arena; Referee: Firat Aydinus

29 December 2013 17	Trabzonspor	2 – 1	Antalyaspor	Trabzon
16:00 EET (UTC+2)	Zokora (yellow card) 17'; Demir (yellow card) 33'; Malouda 44' (pen.); Adın (yellow card) 78'; Güral 81'	Summary	Yıldırım (yellow card) 20' (goal) 31'; Güngör (yellow card) 26'	Stadium: Hüseyin Avni Aker Stadium; Referee: Huseyin Gocek

25 January 2014 18	Trabzonspor	1 – 1	Beşiktaş	Trabzon
19:00 EET (UTC+2)	Güral 15'; Zokora (yellow card) 36'; Yumlu (yellow card) 53'; Özdemir (yellow card) 90'	Summary	Kavlak (yellow card) 52'; Almeida 85'; Pektemek (yellow card) 87'	Stadium: Hüseyin Avni Aker Stadium; Referee: Yunus Yildirm

3 February 2014 19	Çaykur Rizespor	0 – 0	Trabzonspor	Rize
20:00 EET (UTC+2)	Görk (yellow card) 67'; Kadhim (yellow card) 74'; Karakaş (yellow card) 85'	Summary	Erdoğan (yellow card) 51' (yellow-red card) 79'	Stadium: Yeni Rize Şehir Stadı; Referee: Tolga Ozkalfa

9 February 2014 20	Trabzonspor	2 – 4	Akhisar Belediyespor	Trabzon
19:00 EET (UTC+2)	Adın 26', 90+2'; Bourceanu (yellow card) 57'; Güral (yellow card) 78'	Summary	Demirok 16'; Özer (yellow card) 46'; Akyüz 51', 55', 74'; Atan (yellow card) 84'	Stadium: Hüseyin Avni Aker Stadium; Referee: Ali Palabıyık

15 February 2014 21	Kardemir Karabükspor	2 – 2	Trabzonspor	Karabük
19:00 EET (UTC+2)	Çağıran (yellow card) 33'; Akça 52'; Eneramo 54'	Summary	Güral 10', 87'; Zokora (yellow card) 54'; Keleş (yellow card) 71'; Adın (yellow card) 90+1'	Stadium: Dr. Necmettin Şeyhoğlu Stadium; Referee: Suleyman Abay

23 February 2014 22	Trabzonspor	2 – 1	Kayserispor	Trabzon
19:00 EET (UTC+2)	Yumlu (yellow card) 41'; Mierzejewski 49'; Janko 58' (yellow card) 82'	Summary	Mijailović 39'; Mouche (yellow card) 87'; Köz (yellow card) 90'	Stadium: Hüseyin Avni Aker Stadium; Referee: Firat Aydinus

2 March 2014 23	Torku Konyaspor	0 – 0	Trabzonspor	Konya
16:00 EET (UTC+2)	Ay (yellow card) 79'	Summary	Malouda (yellow card) 19'; Henrique (yellow card) 62'; Bourceanu (yellow card) 88'	Stadium: Konya Atatürk Stadium; Referee: Huseyin Gocek

10 March 2014 24	Trabzonspor	0 – 3	Fenerbahçe	Trabzon
20:00 EET (UTC+2)		Summary	Emenike 23'	Stadium: Hüseyin Avni Aker Stadium; Referee: Bulent Yildirim

16 March 2014 25	Sivasspor	0 – 4	Trabzonspor	Sivas
16:00 EET (UTC+2)		Summary	Yumlu 2'; Adın 18'; Henrique 31'; Bourceanu (yellow card) 32'; Hurmacı 56' (yellow card) 57'	Stadium: Sivas 4 Eylül Stadium; Referee: Cuneyt Çakιr

21 March 2014 26	Trabzonspor	0 – 0	Kasımpaşa	Trabzon
20:00 EET (UTC+2)	Yumlu (yellow card) 59'; Demir (yellow card) 71'; Adın (yellow card) 74'; Akbaş (yellow card) 90+1'	Summary	Kaplan (yellow card) 85' (yellow-red card) 90+2'	Stadium: Hüseyin Avni Aker Stadium; Referee: Mustafa Coskun

29 March 2014 27	Elazığspor	0 – 0	Trabzonspor	Elazığ
16:00 EET (UTC+2)	Yılmaz (yellow card) 25'	Summary	Demir (yellow card) 7'; Hurmacı (yellow card) 83'	Stadium: Elazığ Atatürk Stadium; Referee: Mete Kalkavan

7 April 2014 28	Trabzonspor	3 – 0	Gençlerbirliği	Trabzon
20:00 EEST (UTC+3)	Mierzejewski 25' (pen.); Henrique 75'; Yumlu (yellow card) 80'; Erdoğan 86'	Summary		Stadium: Hüseyin Avni Aker Stadium; Referee: Ilker Meral

13 April 2014 29	Eskişehirspor	2 – 2	Trabzonspor	Eskişehir
16:00 EEST (UTC+3)	Zengin 68' (pen.) 72' (pen.); Dedé (yellow card) 75'	Summary	Hurmacı 40'; Henrique (yellow card) 45' (goal) 50'; Yavru (yellow card) 67'; Keleş (yellow card) 71'; Demir (yellow card) 72' (yellow-red card) 88'; Adın (yellow card) 90'; Kıvrak (yellow card) 90'	Stadium: Eskişehir Atatürk Stadium; Referee: Volkan Bayarslan

18 April 2014 30	Kayseri Erciyesspor	0 – 5	Trabzonspor	Kayseri
20:00 EEST (UTC+3)	Ibričić (yellow card) 58'	Summary	Henrique 5'; Osmanpaşa (yellow card) 14'; Erdoğan 28', 39'; Adın 62'; Aydoğdu 90'	Stadium: Kadir Has Stadium; Referee: Huseyin Gocek

26 April 2014 31	Trabzonspor	2 – 1	Gaziantepspor	Trabzon
19:00 EEST (UTC+3)	Yumlu (yellow card) 5'; Henrique 7', 43'	Summary	Tosun 63'; Stankevičius (yellow card) 84'	Stadium: Hüseyin Avni Aker Stadium; Referee: Yunus Yildirim

4 May 2014 32	Bursaspor	2 – 2	Trabzonspor	Bursa
15:30 EEST (UTC+3)	Yılmaz 10'; Pehlivan (yellow card) 19'; Šesták (yellow card) 26'; Belluschi 60'; Şen (yellow card) 62'; Özbayraklı (yellow card) 76'; Ünal (yellow card) 90'	Summary	Henrique 29'; Keleş (yellow card) 59' (goal) 90+3'; Yavru 70'	Stadium: Bursa Atatürk Stadium; Referee: Cagatay Sahan

11 May 2014 33	Trabzonspor	1 – 4	Galatasaray	Trabzon
19:00 EEST (UTC+3)	Bosingwa (yellow card) 55'; Mierzejewski 60' (pen.); Kıvrak (yellow card) 84'	Summary	Sneijder 51', 83' (yellow card) 79'; Selçuk 56'; Umut 73'	Stadium: Hüseyin Avni Aker Stadium; Referee: Firat Aydinus

18 May 2014 34	Antalyaspor	0 – 2	Trabzonspor	Antalya
19:00 EEST (UTC+3)	Wederson (yellow card) 50'; İnceman (yellow card) 74'	Summary	Yavru 13'; Keleş (yellow card) 44'; Adın 51'; Bourceanu (yellow card) 88'	Stadium: Akdeniz University Stadium; Referee: Serkan Cinar

==== League table ====
Pos	Team	Pld	W	D	L	GF	GA	GD	Pts	Qualification or relegation
2	Galatasaray	34	18	11	5	59	32	+27	65	Qualification for the Champions League group stage (Note: Although Fenerbahçe would have qualified for the Champions League group stage as champions, they were barred from participating in next season's European competitions due to UEFA sanctioning because of the 2011 Turkish football match-fixing scandal, with this season also counting for that ban. As a result, the runners-up of the league (Galatasaray) entered the Champions League group stage instead of the third qualifying round, the third-placed team of the league (Beşiktaş) entered the Champions League third qualifying round instead of the Europa League play-off round, and the fourth-placed team of the league (Trabzonspor) entered the Europa League play-off round instead of the third qualifying round.)
3	Beşiktaş	34	17	11	6	53	33	+20	62	Qualification for the Champions League third qualifying round
4	Trabzonspor	34	14	11	9	53	41	+12	53 (Note: Trabzonspor finished ahead of Sivasspor on head-to-head record: Trabzonspor–Sivasspor 0–0, Sivasspor–Trabzonspor 0–4.)	Qualification for the Europa League play-off round
5	Sivasspor	34	16	5	13	60	55	+5	53	(Note: Sivasspor were banned from European competitions by UEFA due to match-fixing. As a result, their Europa League spot was passed down the league to the next eligible team (Karabükspor).)
6	Kasımpaşa (Note: Kasımpaşa, Konyaspor and Gaziantepspor were not granted a UEFA license by the Turkish Football Federation, and could therefore not qualify for European competitions.)	34	13	12	9	56	39	+17	51	

Source: tff.org
Rules for classification: 1) points; 2) goal difference; 3) number of goals scored.

=== Turkish Cup ===
==== First stage ====
4 December 2013 Fourth round	Balıkesirspor	3 – 1	Trabzonspor	Balıkesir
13:00 EET (UTC+2)	Karikari 5'; Reis 9' (pen.); H.Hatipoğlu 34'; Arıcı (yellow card) 54'	Summary	Yavru (yellow card) 8'; Janko 19'; Bamba (yellow card) 62'; Keleş (yellow card) 66'	Stadium: Balıkesir Atatürk Stadium; Referee: Ozguc Turkalp

=== UEFA Europa League ===
==== Qualifying rounds ====
18 July 2013 Second qualifying round 1st leg	Trabzonspor (Turkey)	4 – 2	(Northern Ireland) Derry City	Trabzon, Turkey
21:30 EET (UTC+2)	Mierzejewski 10'; Henrique 15'; Molloy 39' (o.g.); Kaçar 52'	Report	McDaid 24'; Kavanagh 32'; E.Osbourne (yellow card) 60'	Stadium: Hüseyin Avni Aker; Attendance: 17,213; Referee: Artyom Kuchin (Kazakhstan)

25 July 2013 Second qualifying round 2nd leg	Derry City (Northern Ireland)	0 – 3 (2 – 7 agg.)	(Turkey) Trabzonspor	Derry, Northern Ireland
21:45 EET (UTC+2)	Greacen (yellow card) 43'; S.McEleney (yellow card) 60'	Report	Kaçar (yellow card) 35'; Henrique 56', 82'; Yumlu (yellow card) 67'; Özdemir 90+1'	Stadium: Brandywell; Attendance: 2,150; Referee: Michael Lerjéus (Sweden)

1 August 2013 Third qualifying round 1st leg	Dinamo Minsk (Belarus)	0 – 1	(Turkey) Trabzonspor	Brest, Belarus
19:00 EET (UTC+2)	Veratsila (yellow card) 50'; Veselinović (red card) 90+6'	Report	Henrique 41'; Yumlu (yellow card) 90'; Şen (yellow card) 90+4'; Colman (red card) 90+6'; Kıvrak (yellow card) 90+7'	Stadium: OSK Brestskiy; Attendance: 7,500; Referee: Rene Eisner (Austria)

8 August 2013 Third qualifying round 2nd leg	Trabzonspor (Turkey)	0 – 0 (1 – 0 agg.)	(Belarus) Dinamo Minsk	Trabzon, Turkey
21:00EET (UTC+2)	Aydoğdu (yellow card) 35'; Adın (yellow card) 39'; Demir (yellow card) 78'	Report	Nikolić (yellow card) 70'	Stadium: Hüseyin Avni Aker; Attendance: 22,803; Referee: Stephan Studer (Switzerland)

22 August 2013 Play-off 1st leg	Kukësi (Albania)	0 – 2	(Turkey) Trabzonspor	Tirana, Albania
20:30 EET (UTC+2)	Hallaçi (yellow card) 37'; Smajlaj (yellow card) 52'	Report	Henrique (yellow card) 12' (goal) 68'; Mierzejewski 31' (pen.); Yavru (yellow card) 37'; Yumlu (yellow card) 80'	Stadium: Qemal Stafa, Attendance: 10,000; Referee: Stanislav Todorov (Bulgaria)

29 August 2013 Play-off 2nd leg	Trabzonspor (Turkey)	3 – 1 (5 – 1 agg.)	(Albania) Kukësi	Trabzon, Turkey
19:30 EET (UTC+2)	Henrique 14', 64'; Malouda 54'; Karadeniz (yellow card) 83'	Report	Popović 11' (yellow card) 77'	Stadium: Hüseyin Avni Aker; Attendance: 23,500; Referee: Libor Kovařík (Czech Republic)

==== Group stage ====
Pos	Team	Pld	W	D	L	GF	GA	GD	Pts	Qualification	TRA	LAZ	APO	LEG
1	(Turkey) Trabzonspor	6	4	2	0	13	6	+7	14	Advance to knockout phase	—	3–3	4–2	2–0
2	(Italy) Lazio	6	3	3	0	8	4	+4	12	Advance to knockout phase	0–0	—	2–1	1–0
3	(Cyprus) Apollon Limassol	6	1	1	4	5	10	−5	4		1–2	0–0	—	0–2
4	(Poland) Legia Warsaw	6	1	0	5	2	8	−6	3		0–2	0–2	0–1	—

Source: Soccerway

19 September 2013 1	Apollon Limassol (Cyprus)	1 – 2	(Turkey) Trabzonspor	Strovolos, Cyprus
22:05 EET (UTC+2)	Sangoy 18' (pen.) (yellow card) 81'; Vasiliou (yellow card) 89'	Report	Demir (yellow card) 5'; Bamba (yellow card) 17'; Malouda 20'; Bosingwa (yellow card) 59'; Yumlu (yellow card) 71'; Erdoğan 86'	Stadium: Neo GSP; Attendance: 10,204; Referee: Antonio Mateu Lahoz (Spain)

3 October 2013 2	Trabzonspor (Turkey)	3 – 3	(Italy) Lazio	Trabzon, Turkey
20:00 EET (UTC+2)	Erdoğan 12'; Mierzejewski 22'; Henrique 35'	Summary	Onazi 29'; Cavanda (yellow card) 74'; Floccari 84', 85'	Stadium: Hüseyin Avni Aker Stadium; Attendance: 13,002; Referee: Martin Hansson (Sweden)

24 October 2013 3	Trabzonspor (Turkey)	2 – 0	(Poland) Legia Warsaw	Trabzon, Turkey
20:00 EET (UTC+2)	Janko 7'; Zokora (yellow card) 36'; Bamba (yellow card) 62'; Henrique (yellow card) 68'; Adın 83'; Güral (yellow card) 90+4'	Summary	Kosecki (yellow card) 32'; Jodłowiec (yellow card) 36'; Rzeźniczak (yellow card) 78'	Stadium: Hüseyin Avni Aker Stadium; Attendance: 12,871; Referee: Vladislav Bezborodov (Russia)

7 November 2013 4	Legia Warsaw (Poland)	0 – 2	(Turkey) Trabzonspor	Warsaw, Poland
22:05 EET (UTC+2)	Furman (yellow card) 50'	Summary	Malouda (yellow card) 35'; Zokora (yellow card) 66'; Júnior 71' (o.g.); Adin 79'	Stadium: Polish Army Stadium; Attendance: 14,088; Referee: Ruddy Buquet (France)

28 November 2013 5	Trabzonspor (Turkey)	4 – 2	(Cyprus) Apollon Limassol	Trabzon, Turkey
20:00 EET (UTC+2)	Adin 23', 61', 83'; Aydoğdu 25'; Keleş (yellow card) 79'; Zokora (yellow card) 90+2'	Summary	Konstantinou (yellow card) 40'; Grigorie (yellow card) 62'; Abraham Gneki Guié 68'; Sangoy 80' (pen.) (yellow card) 90+2'	Stadium: Hüseyin Avni Aker Stadium; Attendance: 11,151; Referee: Manuel Gräfe (Germany)

12 December 2013 6	Lazio (Italy)	0 – 0	(Turkey) Trabzonspor	Rome, Italy
22:05 EET (UTC+2)	Biava (yellow card) 33'; Radu (yellow card) 86'; Candreva (yellow card) 90+1'	Report	Akgün (yellow card) 21'; Demir (yellow card) 59'; Erdoğan (yellow card) 67'	Stadium: Stadio Olimpico; Attendance: 7,732; Referee: Clément Turpin (France)

==== Knockout phase ====
20 February 2014 Round of 32 1st leg	Juventus (Italy)	2 – 0	(Turkey) Trabzonspor	Turin, Italy
20:00 EET (UTC+2)	Osvaldo 16'; Pogba 90+4'	Report	Zokora (yellow card) 74'; Yumlu (yellow card) 90+5'	Stadium: Juventus Stadium; Attendance: 35,436; Referee: Aleksei Kulbakov (Belarus)

27 February 2014 Round of 32 2nd leg	Trabzonspor (Turkey)	0 – 2 (0 – 4 agg.)	(Italy) Juventus	Trabzon, Turkey
22:05 EET (UTC+2)		Report	Vidal 18'; Osvaldo 33'	Stadium: Hüseyin Avni Aker Stadium; Attendance: 20,686; Referee: (Czech Republic) Pavel Kralovec

== Squad statistics ==
=== Appearances and goals ===
No.	Pos	Nat	Player	Total		Süper Lig		Turkish Cup		UEFA Europa League	
No.	Pos	Nat	Player	Apps	Goals	Apps	Goals	Apps	Goals	Apps	Goals
1	GK	(Turkey) TUR	Onur Kıvrak	46	0	32	0	0	0	14	0
3	DF	(Portugal) POR	Jose Bosingwa	36	0	27	0	1	0	8	0
4	DF	(Turkey) TUR	Aykut Demir	41	0	27+2	0	1	0	9+2	0
6	DF	(Ivory Coast) CIV	Sol Bamba	15	0	9	0	1	0	5	0
8	MF	(Turkey) TUR	Soner Aydoğdu	18	2	3+9	1	1	0	3+2	1
9	FW	(Turkey) TUR	Emre Güral	27	7	5+16	7	1	0	1+4	0
10	MF	(Poland) POL	Adrian Mierzejewski	40	7	23+4	4	1	0	11+1	3
11	FW	(Turkey) TUR	Şahin Aygüneş	9	0	1+7	0	0	0	0+1	0
12	FW	(Brazil) BRA	Paulo Henrique	46	21	28+4	13	1	0	12+1	8
15	MF	(France) FRA	Florent Malouda	29	7	18+1	5	0	0	8+2	2
19	MF	(Turkey) TUR	Abdulkadir Özdemir	13	1	1+8	0	1	0	0+3	1
20	MF	(Argentina) ARG	Gustavo Colman	25	1	13+3	1	0	0	9	0
21	MF	(Turkey) TUR	Özer Hurmacı	13	2	10+1	2	0	0	2	0
22	DF	(Turkey) TUR	Mustafa Yumlu	43	3	28+1	3	1	0	13	0
23	DF	(Turkey) TUR	Giray Kaçar	11	1	5	0	0	0	5+1	1
26	GK	(Turkey) TUR	Fatih Öztürk	1	0	1	0	0	0	0	0
29	MF	(Turkey) TUR	Olcan Adın	48	15	33	10	1	0	14	5
32	MF	(Turkey) TUR	Yusuf Erdoğan	36	6	20+8	4	0	0	2+6	2
33	DF	(Turkey) TUR	Mustafa Akbaş	8	0	8	0	0	0	0	0
55	MF	(Romania) ROU	Alexandru Bourceanu	14	0	12	0	0	0	1+1	0
61	DF	(Turkey) TUR	Zeki Yavru	26	2	12+5	2	1	0	6+2	0
83	FW	(Austria) AUT	Marc Janko	13	3	2+7	1	1	1	2+1	1
88	DF	(Turkey) TUR	Caner Osmanpaşa	9	0	6+2	0	0	0	0+1	0
89	GK	(Turkey) TUR	Zeki Ayvaz	3	0	1	0	1	0	0+1	0
90	MF	(Turkey) TUR	Gökhan Alsan	2	0	0+2	0	0	0	0	0
99	DF	(Turkey) TUR	Kadir Keleş	22	0	13+5	0	1	0	3	0
Players away from the club on loan :
28	DF	(Czech Republic) CZE	Ondřej Čelůstka	4	0	0	0	0	0	4	0
Players who appeared for Trabzonspor no longer at the club:
5	MF	(Ivory Coast) CIV	Didier Zokora	33	0	23+1	0	0	0	9	0
7	MF	(Turkey) TUR	Volkan Şen	8	0	3	0	0	0	5	0
17	FW	(Turkey) TUR	Batuhan Karadeniz	4	0	0+2	0	0	0	0+2	0
18	MF	(Turkey) TUR	Aykut Akgün	21	0	9+3	0	0	0	7+2	0
25	MF	(Brazil) BRA	Alanzinho	9	0	1	0	0	0	1+7	0

=== Goal scorers ===
Place	Position	Nation	Number	Name	Süper Lig	Turkish Cup	UEFA Europa League	Total
1	FW	(Brazil)	12	Paulo Henrique	13	0	8	21
2	MF	(Turkey)	29	Olcan Adın	10	0	5	15
3	FW	(Turkey)	9	Emre Güral	7	0	0	7
3	MF	(France)	15	Florent Malouda	5	0	2	7
3	MF	(Poland)	10	Adrian Mierzejewski	4	0	3	7
6	MF	(Turkey)	32	Yusuf Erdoğan	4	0	2	6
7	FW	(Austria)	83	Marc Janko	1	1	1	3
7	DF	(Turkey)	22	Mustafa Yumlu	3	0	0	3
9	MF	(Turkey)	8	Soner Aydoğdu	1	0	1	2
9	MF	(Turkey)	21	Özer Hurmacı	2	0	0	2
9	DF	(Turkey)	61	Zeki Yavru	2	0	0	2
9				Own goal	0	0	2	2
13	MF	(Argentina)	20	Gustavo Colman	1	0	0	1
13	DF	(Turkey)	23	Giray Kaçar	0	0	1	1
13	MF	(Turkey)	19	Abdulkadir Özdemir	0	0	1	1
				TOTALS	53	1	26	80

=== Disciplinary record ===
Number	Nation	Position	Name	Süper Lig		Turkish Cup		UEFA Europa League		Total	
Number	Nation	Position	Name	Yellow card	Red card	Yellow card	Red card	Yellow card	Red card	Yellow card	Red card
1	(Turkey)	GK	Onur Kıvrak	4	0	0	0	1	0	5	0
3	(Portugal)	DF	José Bosingwa	3	1	0	0	1	0	4	1
4	(Turkey)	DF	Aykut Demir	11	2	0	0	3	0	14	2
5	(Ivory Coast)	MF	Didier Zokora	7	0	0	0	4	0	11	0
6	(Ivory Coast)	DF	Sol Bamba	2	0	1	0	2	0	5	0
7	(Turkey)	MF	Volkan Şen	0	0	0	0	1	0	1	0
8	(Turkey)	MF	Soner Aydoğdu	0	0	0	0	1	0	1	0
9	(Turkey)	FW	Emre Güral	2	0	0	0	1	0	3	0
10	(Poland)	MF	Adrian Mierzejewski	1	0	0	0	0	0	1	0
12	(Brazil)	FW	Paulo Henrique	3	0	0	0	2	0	5	0
15	(France)	MF	Florent Malouda	5	0	0	0	1	0	6	0
17	(Turkey)	FW	Batuhan Karadeniz	0	0	0	0	1	0	1	0
18	(Turkey)	MF	Aykut Akgün	2	0	0	0	1	0	3	0
19	(Turkey)	MF	Abdulkadir Özdemir	2	0	0	0	0	0	2	0
20	(Argentina)	MF	Gustavo Colman	3	1	0	0	0	1	3	2
21	(Turkey)	MF	Özer Hurmacı	2	0	0	0	0	0	2	0
22	(Turkey)	DF	Mustafa Yumlu	8	1	0	0	5	0	13	1
23	(Turkey)	DF	Giray Kaçar	2	0	0	0	1	0	3	0
25	(Brazil)	MF	Alanzinho	1	0	0	0	0	0	1	0
29	(Turkey)	MF	Olcan Adın	5	0	0	0	1	0	6	0
32	(Turkey)	MF	Yusuf Erdoğan	5	1	0	0	1	0	6	1
33	(Turkey)	DF	Mustafa Akbaş	1	0	0	0	0	0	1	0
55	(Romania)	MF	Alexandru Bourceanu	4	0	0	0	0	0	4	0
61	(Turkey)	DF	Zeki Yavru	3	0	1	0	1	0	5	0
83	(Austria)	FW	Marc Janko	3	0	0	0	0	0	3	0
88	(Turkey)	DF	Caner Osmanpaşa	1	0	0	0	0	0	1	0
99	(Turkey)	DF	Kadir Keleş	5	0	1	0	1	0	7	0
			TOTALS	85	6	3	0	29	1	117	7
