= 2014–15 Trabzonspor season =

Trabzonspor
2014–15 season
- President: İbrahim Hacıosmanoğlu
- Manager: Vahid Halilhodžić
- Stadium: Hüseyin Avni Aker
- Süper Lig: 5th
- Turkish Cup: Round of 16
- UEFA Europa League: Round of 32
- Top goalscorer: League: Óscar Cardozo (17); All: Óscar Cardozo (20)
Home colours	Away colours	Third colours

The 2014–15 Football Season was Trabzonspor's 40th consecutive in the Süper Lig. During the season, Trabzonspor also took part in the Turkish Cup, as well as the UEFA Europa League.

== Squad ==
Note: Flags indicate national team as defined under FIFA eligibility rules; some limited exceptions apply. Players may hold more than one non-FIFA nationality.

No.	Pos.	Nation	Player
1	GK	(Turkey) TUR	Onur Kıvrak (Captain)
3	DF	(Portugal) POR	José Bosingwa
4	DF	(Turkey) TUR	Aykut Demir
6	DF	(Ivory Coast) CIV	Sol Bamba
7	FW	(Paraguay) PAR	Óscar Cardozo
8	MF	(Turkey) TUR	Soner Aydoğdu
9	FW	(Turkey) TUR	Emre Güral
10	MF	(Turkey) TUR	Özer Hurmacı
11	FW	(Turkey) TUR	Barış Memiş
13	GK	(Turkey) TUR	İbrahim Demir
15	MF	(France) FRA	Florent Malouda
16	MF	(Turkey) TUR	Batuhan Artarslan
17	FW	(Turkey) TUR	Gökhan Karadeniz
18	FW	(Turkey) TUR	Deniz Yılmaz
20	MF	(Argentina) ARG	Gustavo Colman
22	DF	(Turkey) TUR	Mustafa Yumlu

No.	Pos.	Nation	Player
24	MF	(Turkey) TUR	Anıl Taşdemir
26	GK	(Turkey) TUR	Fatih Öztürk
28	DF	(Czech Republic) CZE	Ondřej Čelůstka
32	MF	(Turkey) TUR	Yusuf Erdoğan
33	DF	(Turkey) TUR	Mustafa Akbaş
38	DF	(Turkey) TUR	Salih Dursun
50	MF	(Turkey) TUR	Ferhat Yazgan
55	MF	(Romania) ROU	Alexandru Bourceanu
61	DF	(Turkey) TUR	Zeki Yavru
67	MF	(Turkey) TUR	Serdar Gürler
77	MF	(Turkey) TUR	Turgut Şahin
88	DF	(Turkey) TUR	Caner Osmanpaşa
99	DF	(Turkey) TUR	Kadir Keleş
—	DF	(Algeria) ALG	Essaïd Belkalem
—	DF	(Guinea) GUI	Kévin Constant

== Transfers ==
=== In ===
Note: Flags indicate national team as defined under FIFA eligibility rules; some limited exceptions apply. Players may hold more than one non-FIFA nationality.

No. / Pos. / Nation / Player; — / FW / (Turkey) TUR / Deniz Yılmaz	No. / Pos. / Nation / Player; — / FW / (Turkey) TUR / Serdar Gürler

== Competitions ==
=== Süper Lig ===
Pos	Team	Pld	W	D	L	GF	GA	GD	Pts	Qualification or relegation
3	Beşiktaş	34	21	6	7	55	32	+23	69	Qualification for the Europa League group stage
4	İstanbul Başakşehir	34	15	14	5	49	30	+19	59	Qualification for the Europa League third qualifying round
5	Trabzonspor	34	15	12	7	58	48	+10	57 (Note: Trabzonspor finished ahead of Bursaspor on head-to-head record: Trabzonspor–Bursaspor 1–0, Bursaspor–Trabzonspor 3–3.)	Qualification for the Europa League second qualifying round
6	Bursaspor (Note: Bursaspor were banned from European competitions by UEFA for the following four seasons due to financial issues.)	34	16	9	9	69	44	+25	57	
7	Mersin İdmanyurdu (Note: Mersin İdmanyurdu, Gaziantepspor, Eskişehirspor, Balıkesirspor, Kasımpaşa and Kayseri Erciyesspor were not granted a UEFA license by the Turkish Football Federation, and could therefore not qualify for European competitions.)	34	13	8	13	54	48	+6	47	

Source: Süper Lig
Rules for classification: 1) points; 2) head-to-head points; 3) head-to-head goal difference; 4) goal difference; 5) number of goals scored (It is also decided that only criteria 1, 4 and 5 would be applied to establish the classification during the competition)

=== UEFA Europa League ===
==== Group stage ====
Pos	Team	Pld	W	D	L	GF	GA	GD	Pts	Qualification	LEG	TRA	LOK	MET
1	(Poland) Legia Warsaw	6	5	0	1	7	2	+5	15	Advance to knockout phase	—	2–0	1–0	2–1
2	(Turkey) Trabzonspor	6	3	1	2	8	6	+2	10	Advance to knockout phase	0–1	—	2–0	3–1
3	(Belgium) Lokeren	6	3	1	2	4	4	0	10		1–0	1–1	—	1–0
4	(Ukraine) Metalist Kharkiv	6	0	0	6	3	10	−7	0		0–1	1–2	0–1	—

Source: Soccerway
Rules for classification: Group stage tiebreakers
