= 2012–13 Trabzonspor season =

Trabzonspor
2012–13 season
- President: Sadri Sener
- Manager: Şenol Güneş; Tolunay Kafkas
- Stadium: Hüseyin Avni Aker Stadium
- Süper Lig: 9th
- Turkish Cup: Runners-up
- UEFA Europa League: Play-off round
- Top goalscorer: League: Olcan Adın; Halil Altıntop (7 each); All: Adrian Mierzejewski (13)
Home colours	Away colours	Third colours

In the 2012–13 season, Trabzonspor finished in ninth place in the Süper Lig. The top scorer of the team was Adrian Mierzejewski, who scored thirteen goals.

This article shows statistics of the club's players and matches during the season.

== Sponsor ==
- Türk Telekom

== Players ==
Note: Flags indicate national team as defined under FIFA eligibility rules; some limited exceptions apply. Players may hold more than one non-FIFA nationality.

No.	Pos.	Nation	Player
1	GK	(Turkey) TUR	Onur Kıvrak
2	DF	(Turkey) TUR	Uğur Dündar
3	DF	(Turkey) TUR	Abdullah Karmil
5	DF	(Slovakia) SVK	Marek Čech
6	DF	(Ivory Coast) CIV	Souleymane Bamba
9	FW	(Turkey) TUR	Emre Güral
10	MF	(Poland) POL	Adrian Mierzejewski
11	MF	(Turkey) TUR	Yasin Öztekin
12	FW	(Brazil) BRA	Paulo Henrique
14	MF	(Turkey) TUR	Soner Aydoğdu
16	DF	(Turkey) TUR	Alim Öztürk
15	MF	(Ivory Coast) CIV	Didier Zokora
18	MF	(Turkey) TUR	Aykut Akgün
20	MF	(Argentina) ARG	Gustavo Colman
21	FW	(Turkey) TUR	Halil Altıntop

No.	Pos.	Nation	Player
22	DF	(Turkey) TUR	Mustafa Yumlu
23	DF	(Turkey) TUR	Giray Kaçar
25	MF	(Brazil) BRA	Alanzinho
27	MF	(Slovakia) SVK	Marek Sapara
28	DF	(Czech Republic) CZE	Ondřej Čelůstka
29	GK	(Turkey) TUR	Tolga Zengin (Captain)
30	MF	(Turkey) TUR	Serkan Balcı
40	MF	(Turkey) TUR	Volkan Şen
83	FW	(Austria) AUT	Marc Janko
86	DF	(Brazil) BRA	Emerson
89	GK	(Turkey) TUR	Zeki Ayvaz
91	DF	(Turkey) TUR	Zeki Yavru
92	MF	(Turkey) TUR	Olcan Adın

== Super Lig ==
Pos	Team	Pld	W	D	L	GF	GA	GD	Pts	Qualification or relegation
7	Antalyaspor	34	14	5	15	50	52	−2	47	
8	Eskişehirspor	34	11	13	10	48	40	+8	46 (Note: Eskişehirspor were ahead of Trabzonspor and Gaziantepspor on head-to-head goal difference: Eskişehirspor: 6 pts, 7–3 (+4); Trabzonspor: 6 pts, 5–5 (0); Gaziantepspor: 6 pts, 4–8 (–4).)	
9	Trabzonspor	34	13	7	14	39	40	−1	46	Qualification for the Europa League second qualifying round (Note: Since the winners of the 2012–13 Turkish Cup, Fenerbahçe, qualified for European competition based on league position, the spot awarded to the cup winners (Europa League second qualifying round) was passed to the cup runners-up, Trabzonspor.)
10	Gaziantepspor	34	12	10	12	42	49	−7	46	
11	Gençlerbirliği	34	10	15	9	46	47	−1	45	

Rules for classification: 1) points; 2) goal difference; 3) number of goals scored.

== Turkish Cup ==
=== Fourth round ===
Team 1	Score	Team 2
Trabzonspor	4–0	Şanlıurfaspor

=== Fifth round ===
Team 1	Score	Team 2
Kasımpaşa	1–1 (2–4 p)	Trabzonspor

=== Group stage ===
Pos	Team	Pld	W	D	L	GF	GA	GD	Pts	TRA	ESK	ANT	MİY
1	Trabzonspor	6	5	0	1	11	3	+8	15		2–0	1–0	3–0
2	Eskişehirspor	6	4	0	2	9	5	+4	12	1–0		2–1	3–1
3	Antalyaspor	6	3	0	3	13	8	+5	9	2–3	1–0		4–2
4	Mersin İdman Yurdu	6	0	0	6	3	20	−17	0	0–2	0–3	0–5	

=== Semi-final ===
17 April 2013 Semi-final	Sivasspor	2 − 1	Trabzonspor	Sivas, Turkey
19:00 EEST (UTC+03)	Chahechouhe 44'; E. Kılıç 76'	Report (in Turkish)	Sapara 90'	Stadium: Sivas 4 Eylül Stadium; Attendance: 5,500; Referee: Hüseyin Göçek

=== Second leg ===
8 May 2013 Semi-final	Trabzonspor	6 − 0	Sivasspor	Trabzon, Turkey
19:00 EEST (UTC+03)	Mierzejewski 38', 47', 53'; O. Adın 65'; V. Şen 72'; A. Akgün 77'	Report (in Turkish)		Stadium: Hüseyin Avni Aker Stadium; Attendance: 15,300; Referee: Tolga Özkalfa

=== Final ===
22 May 2013 Final	Fenerbahçe	1 – 0	Trabzonspor	Ankara, Turkey
20:45 EEST (UTC+03)	Sow 9'	Report (in Turkish)		Stadium: Ankara 19 Mayıs Stadium; Attendance: 18,250; Referee: Fırat Aydınus

== UEFA Europa League ==
=== Play-off round ===
23 August 2012 Play-off 1st leg	Trabzonspor (Turkey)	0–0	(Hungary) Videoton	Hüseyin Avni Aker Stadium, Trabzon
20:00		Report		Attendance: 22,778; Referee: Euan Norris (Scotland)

30 August 2012 Play-off 2nd leg	Videoton (Hungary)	0–0 (a.e.t.) (0 – 0 agg.) (4–2 p)	(Turkey) Trabzonspor	Sóstói Stadion, Székesfehérvár
20:30		Report		Attendance: 11,232; Referee: Martin Hansson (Sweden)
	Penalties
	Caneira (penalty scored); Brachi (penalty scored); Gyurcsó (penalty scored); Mitrović (penalty scored)		(penalty scored) Sapara; (penalty scored) Vittek; (penalty missed) Aydoğdu; (penalty missed) Zokora

== See also ==
- 2012–13 Turkish Cup
