= 2011–12 Trabzonspor season =

Trabzonspor
2011–12 season
- President: Sadri Sener
- Manager: Şenol Güneş
- Stadium: Hüseyin Avni Aker Stadium
- Süper Lig: 3rd
- Turkish Cup: Fourth round
- UEFA Champions League: Group stage
- UEFA Europa League: Round of 32
- Top goalscorer: League: Burak Yılmaz (33); All: Burak Yılmaz (35)

The 2011–12 season was Trabzonspor's 37th consecutive season in the Süper Lig. In addition to the domestic league, Trabzonspor participated in the Turkish Cup, the UEFA Champions League and the UEFA Europa League.

Their top scorer was Burak Yılmaz, who scored 35 goals in all competitions.

Trabzonspor's sponsor for the 2011-12 season was Türk Telekom.

== Squad ==
Note: Flags indicate national team as defined under FIFA eligibility rules; some limited exceptions apply. Players may hold more than one non-FIFA nationality.

No.	Pos.	Nation	Player
1	GK	TUR	Onur Kıvrak
29	GK	TUR	Tolga Zengin
89	GK	TUR	Zeki Ayvaz
91	GK	TUR	Bora Sevim
5	DF	SVK	Marek Cech
6	DF	POL	Arkadiusz Glowacki
14	DF	POL	Piotr Brożek
18	DF	TUR	Tayfun Cora
22	DF	TUR	Mustafa Yumlu
23	DF	TUR	Giray Kaçar
28	DF	CZE	Ondrej Celustka
30	DF	TUR	Serkan Balci
55	DF	TUR	Ferhat Öztorun
7	MF	TUR	Sercan Kaya

No.	Pos.	Nation	Player
8	MF	TUR	Barış Özbek
10	MF	POL	Adrian Mierzejewski
15	MF	CIV	Didier Zokora
16	MF	TUR	Eren Albayrak
20	MF	ARG	Gustavo Colman
21	MF	TUR	Barış Ataş
24	MF	TUR	Aykut Akgün
25	MF	BRA	Alanzinho
27	MF	SVK	Marek Sapara
33	MF	CRO	Drago Gabrić
40	MF	TUR	Volkan Şen
28	MD	TUR	Olcan Adın
9	FW	TUR	Halil Altıntop
11	FW	SVK	Robert Vittek
12	FW	BRA	Paulo Henrique
17	FW	TUR	Burak Yılmaz
32	FW	POL	Paweł Brożek

== Competitions ==
=== Süper Lig ===
Pos	Team	Pld	W	D	L	GF	GA	GD	Pts	Qualification or relegation
1	Galatasaray	34	23	8	3	69	24	+45	77	Qualification to Süper Final, Championship group
2	Fenerbahçe	34	20	8	6	61	34	+27	68	Qualification to Süper Final, Championship group
3	Trabzonspor	34	15	11	8	60	39	+21	56	Qualification to Süper Final, Championship group
4	Beşiktaş	34	15	10	9	50	39	+11	55	Qualification to Süper Final, Championship group
5	Eskişehirspor	34	14	8	12	42	41	+1	50 (Note: Eskişehirspor were ahead of İstanbul B.B. and Sivasspor on head-to-head points: Eskişehirspor: 8 pts, İstanbul B.B.: 5 pts, Sivasspor: 2 pts.)	Qualification to Süper Final, Europa League group

Source: TFF's official Süper Lig website
Rules for classification: 1) points; 2) goal difference; 3) number of goals scored.

=== Turkish Playoff Championship Group ===
Pos	Team	Pld	W	D	L	GF	GA	GD	Pts	Qualification	GAL	FEN	TRA	BEŞ
1	Galatasaray (C)	6	2	3	1	9	6	+3	48	Qualification to Champions League group stage		1–2	0–0	2–2
2	Fenerbahçe	6	4	1	1	9	4	+5	47	Qualification to Champions League third qualifying round	0–0		2–0	2–1
3	Trabzonspor	6	1	2	3	5	10	−5	33	Qualification to Europa League play-off round (Note: Trabzonspor entered the play-off round as Fenerbahçe, the winners of the 2011–12 Turkish Cup, already qualified for the Champions League. Moreover, as Beşiktaş is banned 1 year from European football, Europa League spots shifted down, so Bursaspor start from the third qualifying round, as well as Eskişehirspor start from the second qualifying round.)	2–4	1–3		1–0
4	Beşiktaş	6	1	2	3	5	8	−3	33	Banned from 2012–13 European competitions (Note: See 2012–13 UEFA Europa League qualification play-off match. Moreover, as Beşiktaş is banned 1 year from European football, Europa League spots shifted down.)	0–2	1–0	1–1	

Source: SporToto Süper Lig official website
Legend: Blue = home team win; Yellow = draw; Red = away team win.
Rules for classification: 1) points; 2) goal difference; 3) number of goals scored.
(C) Champions

=== Turkish Cup ===
==== Third round ====
11 January 2012 Third round	Trabzonspor	2 – 0	Güngörenspor	Trabzon, Turkey
17:30 EET (UTC+02)	Alanzinho 11'; S. Kaya 61'	Report (in Turkish)		Stadium: Hüseyin Avni Aker Stadium; Attendance: 15,000; Referee: Kutluhan Bilgiç

==== Fourth round ====
21 March 2012 Fourth round	Antalyaspor	2 – 1 (a.e.t.)	Trabzonspor	Antalya, Turkey
18:00 EET (UTC+02)	E. Başsan 44'; M. Aydın 91'	Report (in Turkish)	B. Yılmaz 71' (pen.)	Stadium: Mardan Sports Complex; Attendance: 4,500; Referee: Süleyman Abay
