= Abdulkadir Özdemir =

Turkish footballer

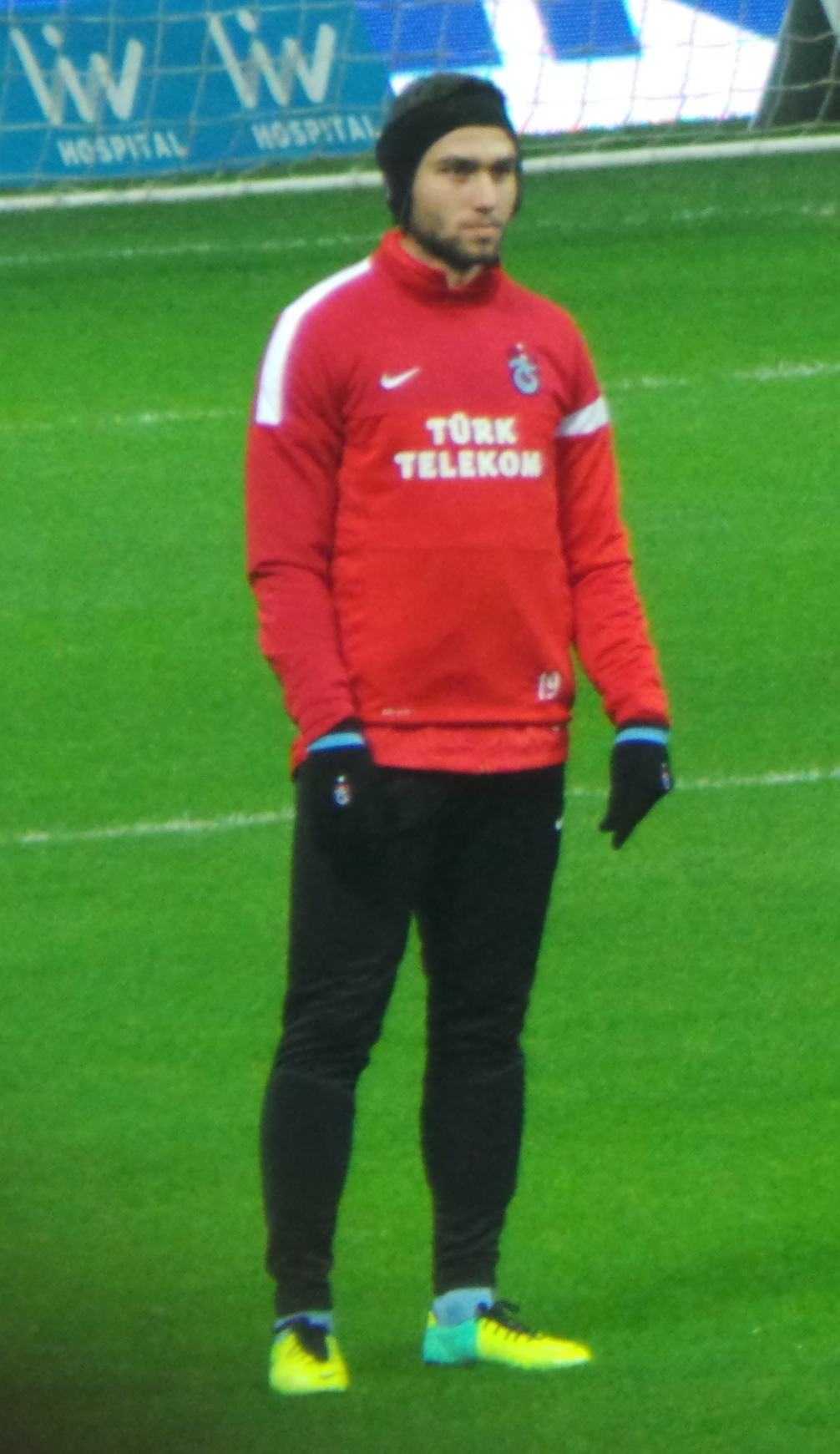

Personal information
- Date of birth: 25 March 1991 (age 35)
- Place of birth: Trabzon, Turkey
- Height: 1.79 m (5 ft 10 in)
- Position: Midfielder

Team information
- Current team: Fatsa Belediyespor
- Number: 8

Youth career
- 2002–2007: Trabzon İdmanocağı
- 2007–2010: Trabzonspor

Senior career*
Years	Team	Apps	(Gls)
2010–2013	1461 Trabzon	87	(1)
2013–2015	Trabzonspor	9	(0)
2014–2015	→ Şanlıurfaspor (loan)	0	(0)
2015–2017	Akhisar Belediyespor	2	(0)
2017	→ Boluspor (loan)	15	(1)
2017–2018	BB Erzurumspor	24	(2)
2018–2019	Adanaspor	30	(1)
2020	Hekimoğlu Trabzon	11	(0)
2020–2021	Vanspor	36	(1)
2021–2022	Ankara Demirspor	21	(1)
2022–2023	Sarıyer	13	(0)
2023	Zonguldak Kömürspor	13	(1)
2023–	Fatsa Belediyespor	3	(0)

International career
2009–2010	Turkey U19	5	(0)
2013	Turkey A2	5	(0)
- * Club domestic league appearances and goals as of 23 September 2023

Abdulkadir Özdemir (born 25 March 1991) is a Turkish footballer who plays for as a midfielder for TFF Third League club Fatsa Belediyespor. He made his Süper Lig debut with Trabzonspor on 23 September 2013.
