= Gökhan Alsan =

Turkish footballer

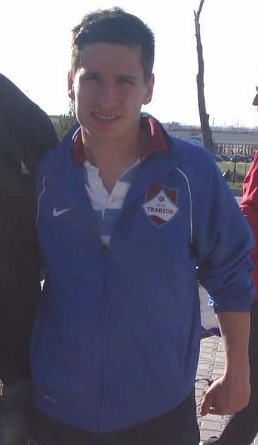
- Gökhan Alsan (2013)

Personal information
- Date of birth: 1 April 1990 (age 36)
- Place of birth: Trabzon, Turkey
- Height: 1.69 m (5 ft 7 in)
- Position: Midfielder

Team information
- Current team: Amed
- Number: 20

Youth career
- 2002–2008: Trabzonspor

Senior career*
Years	Team	Apps	(Gls)
2008–2009	Trabzonspor A2		
2009–2014	1461 Trabzon	134	(20)
2014–2016	Trabzonspor	2	(0)
2014–2015	→ Şanlıurfaspor (loan)	21	(0)
2015–2016	→ Karabükspor (loan)	26	(4)
2016–2019	Gazişehir Gaziantep	97	(21)
2019–2021	Samsunspor	46	(15)
2021–2022	BB Erzurumspor	31	(2)
2022–2023	Boluspor	17	(5)
2023–	Amed	4	(3)
- * Club domestic league appearances and goals as of 17 September 2023

Gökhan Alsan (born 1 April 1990) is a Turkish footballer who plays as a midfielder for Amed.
