= Volkan Şen =

Turkish footballer (born 1987)

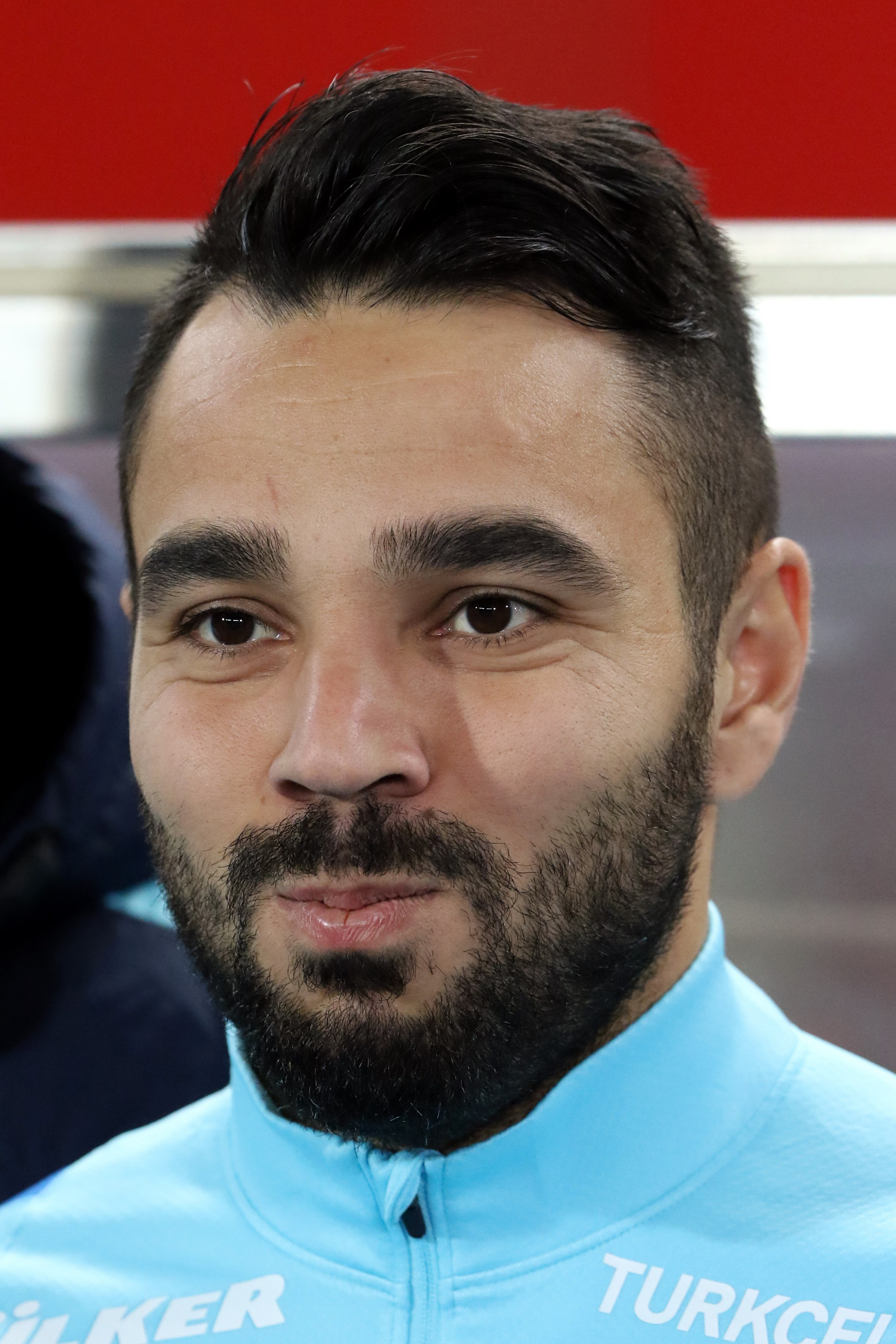
- Şen with Turkey in 2016

Personal information
- Date of birth: 7 July 1987 (age 39)
- Place of birth: Bursa, Turkey
- Height: 1.75 m (5 ft 9 in)
- Position: Winger

Youth career
- 2000–2002: Bursa Merinosspor
- 2002–2004: TSE Arabayatağıspor
- 2004–2005: Bursaspor

Senior career*
Years	Team	Apps	(Gls)
2005–2011	Bursaspor	102	(11)
2005–2007	→ Bursa Merinosspor (loan)	16	(2)
2011–2014	Trabzonspor	43	(6)
2014–2015	Bursaspor	43	(12)
2015–2017	Fenerbahçe	51	(5)
2017–2018	Trabzonspor	3	(0)
2018–2019	Konyaspor	10	(1)
2019–2023	Adana Demirspor	44	(10)
2022	→ Tuzlaspor (loan)	0	(0)

International career^{‡}
2007–2008	Turkey U21	4	(0)
2010–2017	Turkey	26	(2)
- * Club domestic league appearances and goals as of 13:38, 26 October 2022 (UTC) ‡ National team caps and goals as of 13:38, 26 October 2022 (UTC)

Volkan Şen (born 7 July 1987) is a Turkish former professional footballer who played as a winger. He is mostly known for his long shots, his dribbling and speed.

== Club career ==
He was born in Bursa and started playing football in Bursa Merinosspor between 2000–02. He started his professional career at Bursaspor in 2005 as an 18-year-old and loaned again to Bursa Merinosspor between 2005–07. In his first season, he made his mark in league (scored 3 goals in 25 matches) and cup competitions (played 4 matches).

In August 2011, Volkan signed for Trabzonspor on a 4-year contract. But in August 2013, Volkan was brought to tears from insults emanating from Trabzonspor supporters and eventually abandoned the pitch. The fans were insulting his recently deceased mother.

In 2014, he returned to Bursaspor, and in 2015 he signed for Fenerbahçe. On 25 May 2016, he was suspended five months from UEFA competitions after pushing referee Ivan Bebek following an incident where he sent off in a UEFA Europa League round of 16 game against Braga on 17 March 2016.

Ahead of the 2017–18 season, the contract between Şen and Fenerbahçe was terminated. Towards the end of the 2017 summer transfer period, he was signed by his former club Trabzonspor. After only half a season, Şen left Trabzon and moved to Konyaspor.

After Şen had been a free agent for the 2018–19 season, he signed a two-year contract with TFF First League club Adana Demirspor in the summer of 2019. It was reported that he left the club in June 2021. According to the Turkish Football Federation, his contract with Adana Demirspor has been extended to 2023 on 1 June 2021 and was not terminated. Despite that, the club did not register him for their league roster for the 2021–22 or 2022–23 season. A loan to Tuzlaspor was arranged in February 2022 and then terminated in late March without Şen making any appearances for Tuzlaspor.

== International career ==
He made his debut for Turkey at the age of 22, starting in a 2–0 friendly win against Honduras on 3 March 2010. He is part of the Turkey national team for Euro 2016. On 11 November 2016, Şen scored his first goal ever for Turkey in a 2018 FIFA World Cup qualification match against Kosovo. Turkey won 2–0.

== Career statistics ==
=== Club ===
As of match played 25 September 2023

Appearances and goals by club, season and competition
Club	Season	League			National Cup		Europe (Note: Appearances in UEFA Champions League and UEFA Europa League)		Other (Note: Appearances in Turkish Super Cup)		Total	
Club	Season	Division	Apps	Goals	Apps	Goals	Apps	Goals	Apps	Goals	Apps	Goals
Bursaspor	2007–08	Süper Lig	25	1	4	1	0	0	—		29	2
Bursaspor	2008–09	Süper Lig	23	1	6	0	0	0	—		29	1
Bursaspor	2009–10	Süper Lig	27	7	5	0	0	0	—		32	7
Bursaspor	2010–11	Süper Lig	27	2	2	0	5	0	1	0	35	2
Bursaspor	2011–12	Süper Lig	0	0	0	0	3	0	—		3	0
Bursaspor	Total		102	11	17	0	8	0	1	0	128	12
Trabzonspor	2011–12	Süper Lig	25	3	1	0	0	0	—		26	3
Trabzonspor	2012–13	Süper Lig	15	3	4	1	2	0	—		21	4
Trabzonspor	2013–14	Süper Lig	3	0	0	0	5	0	—		8	0
Trabzonspor	Total		43	6	5	1	7	0	0	0	55	7
Bursaspor	2013–14	Süper Lig	13	0	3	1	0	0	—		16	1
Bursaspor	2014–15	Süper Lig	30	12	9	5	2	0	—		41	17
Bursaspor	Total		43	12	12	6	2	0	0	0	57	18
Fenerbahçe	2015–16	Süper Lig	25	5	8	2	10	0	—		43	7
Fenerbahçe	2016–17	Süper Lig	26	0	2	1	5	0	—		33	1
Fenerbahçe	Total		51	5	10	3	15	0	0	0	76	8
Trabzonspor	2017–18	Süper Lig	3	0	1	2	0	0	—		4	2
Konyaspor	2018–19	Süper Lig	10	1	0	0	0	0	—		10	1
Adana Demirspor	2019–20	TFF First League	30	9	0	0	—		—		30	9
Adana Demirspor	2020–21	TFF First League	14	1	1	0	—		—		15	1
Adana Demirspor	Total		44	10	1	0	0	0	0	0	45	10
Career total			296	45	48	13	32	0	1	0	377	58

=== International ===
Turkey
Year	Apps	Goals
2010	2	0
2014	2	0
2015	8	0
2016	6	1
2017	2	1
Total	20	2

=== International goals ===
As of 18 June 2017. Turkey score listed first, score column indicates score after each Şen goal.

International goals by date, venue, cap, opponent, score, result and competition
No.	Date	Venue	Cap	Opponent	Score	Result	Competition
1.	11 November 2016	New Antalya Stadium, Antalya, Turkey	24	Kosovo	2–0	2–0	2018 FIFA World Cup qualification
2.	11 June 2017	Loro Boriçi Stadium, Shkodër, Albania	26	Kosovo	1–0	4–1	2018 FIFA World Cup qualification

== Honours ==
Bursaspor

- Süper Lig: 2009–10
