= Yusuf Erdoğan =

Turkish footballer

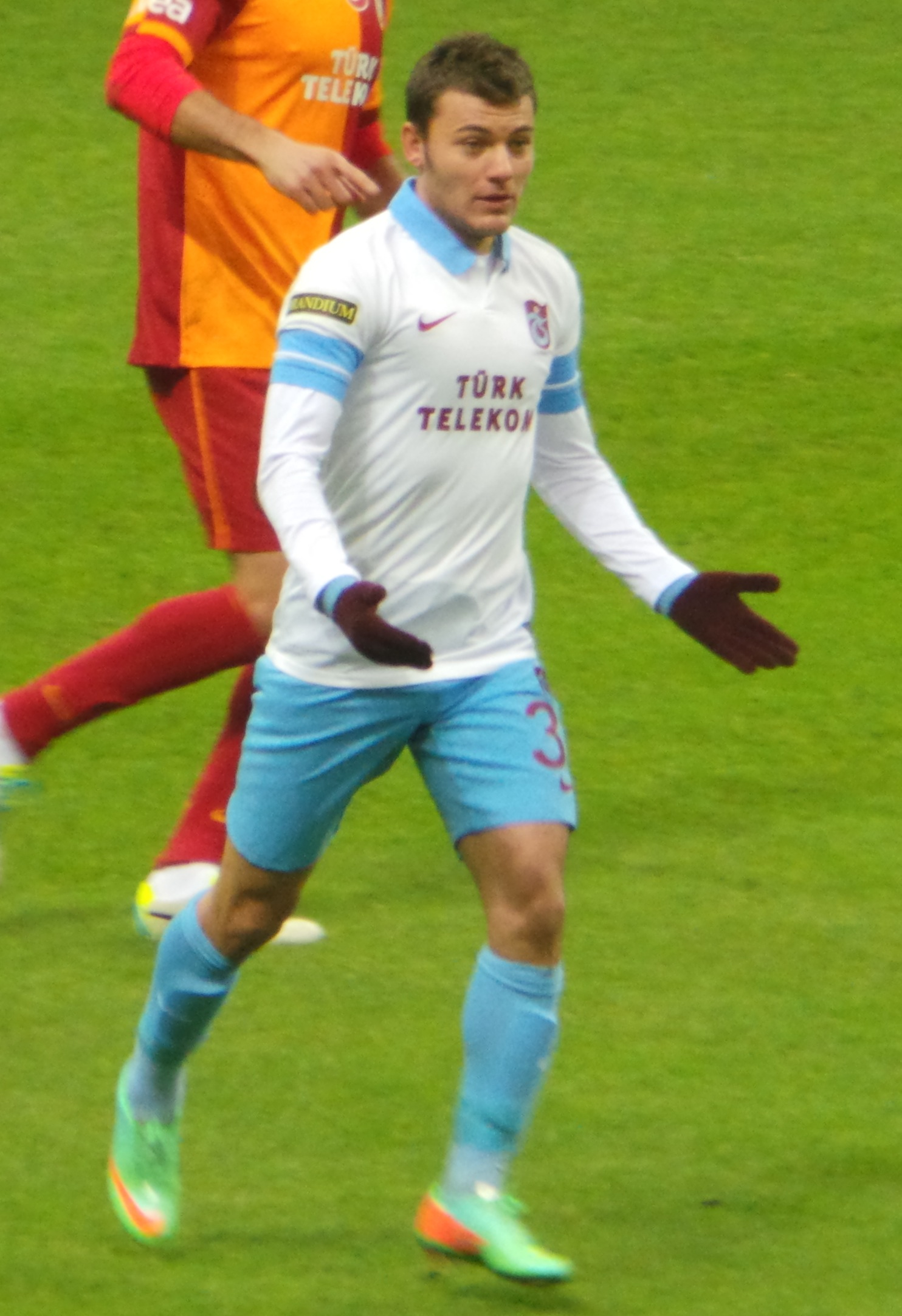
- Erdoğan playing for Trabzonspor in 2013

Personal information
- Date of birth: 7 August 1992 (age 34)
- Place of birth: Isparta, Turkey
- Height: 1.71 m (5 ft 7 in)
- Position: Winger

Team information
- Current team: Esenler Erokspor
- Number: 53

Youth career
- 2006–2009: Araklıspor

Senior career*
Years	Team	Apps	(Gls)
2009–2011	Araklıspor	34	(1)
2011–2013	1461 Trabzon	54	(12)
2013–2017	Trabzonspor	135	(20)
2017–2019	Bursaspor	51	(2)
2019–2022	Kasımpaşa	62	(14)
2022–2023	Trabzonspor	16	(0)
2023–2024	Adana Demirspor	40	(5)
2024–2025	Konyaspor	34	(3)
2025–2026	Çorum	35	(5)
2026–	Esenler Erokspor	9	(1)

International career
2013–2014	Turkey U21	9	(0)
- * Club domestic league appearances and goals as of 15 October 2026

Yusuf Erdoğan (born 7 August 1992) is a Turkish footballer who plays as a winger for TFF 1. Lig club Esenler Erokspor. He can also play as a left-back.

== Career ==
He attracted attention in Trabzonspor. Erdoğan made his Süper Lig debut on 18 August 2013 with Trabzonspor against Beşiktaş in 2–0 away loss. He played there between 2013 and 2017.

After Trabzonspor, he played in Bursaspor and Kasımpaşa in Turkey. Then he backed to his roots. Even though he was in the squad for the championship that came 37 years later, he left the team 2022-23 season due to not being able to find a chance in the first half of the season.

On 16 January 2023, Erdogan signed a 2.5-year contract with Adana Demirspor. He made his debut in this club against Ümraniyespor on 26 February 2023, but did not have the chance to play much that season.

He continued in Adana Demirspor in the 2023-24 season and had the chance to play in the team's UEFA Europa Conference League qualifying round matches and scored goals in both matches against NK Osijek. He scored his first goal in the Super League that season against Rizespor, in the team's first home match and that goal was what led to the win.

== International career ==
In August 2013 he was called up to Turkey U21 in the Euro qualifying. He made his debut against Poland U-21. On 30 August 2015, Erdoğan was selected for the senior Turkey squad for UEFA Euro 2016 qualifiers against Latvia and Netherlands.

== Honours ==
Trabzonspor

- Süper Lig: 2021–22
- Turkish Super Cup: 2022
