= Kadir Keleş =

Turkish footballer

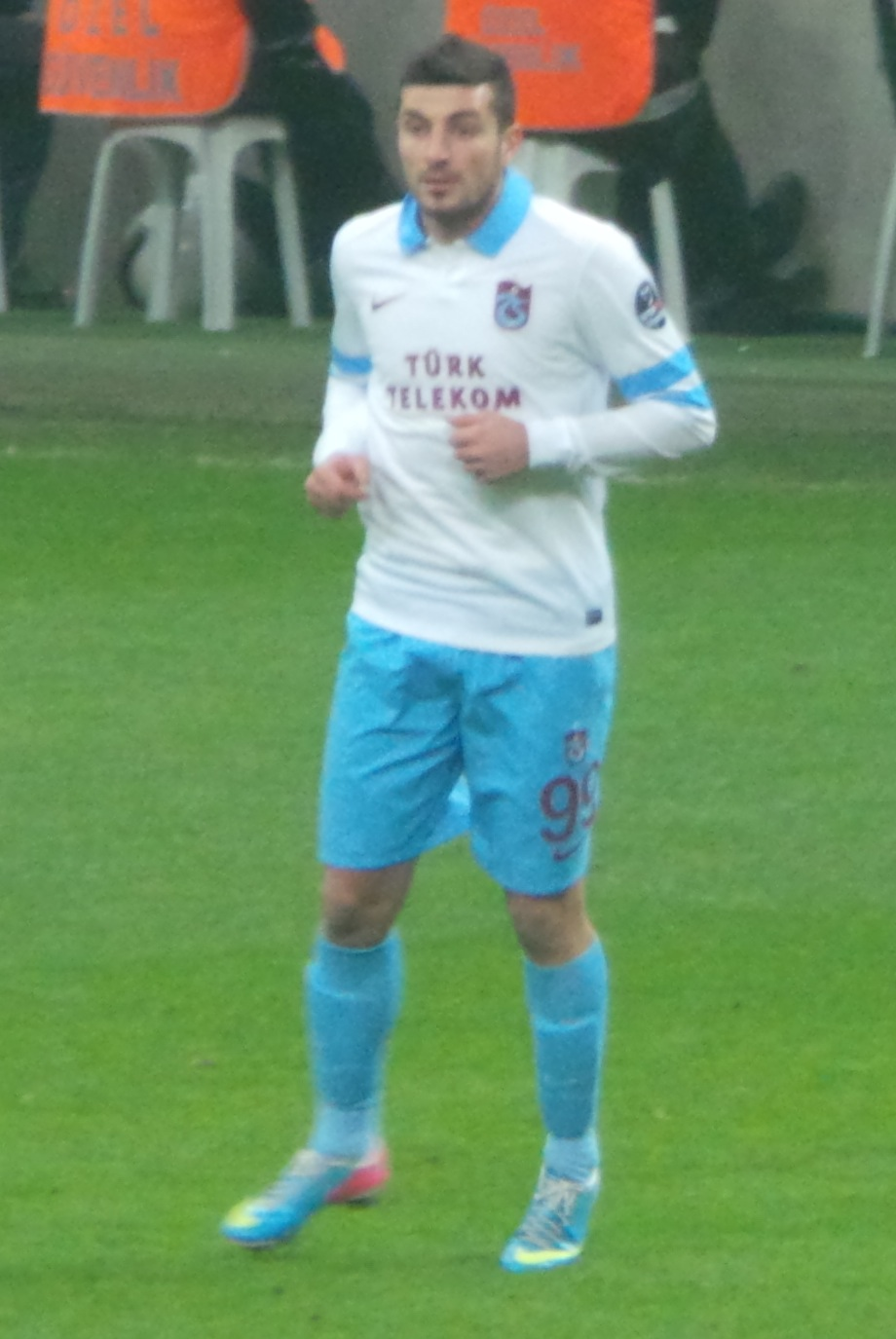

Personal information
- Date of birth: 1 January 1988 (age 38)
- Place of birth: Trabzon, Turkey
- Height: 1.74 m (5 ft 8 1/2 in)
- Positions: Left back; left wing

Youth career
- 2005–2007: Trabzonspor

Senior career*
Years	Team	Apps	(Gls)
2007–2010	Trabzonspor	1	(0)
2008–2009	→ Gaziantep BB (loan)	26	(0)
2009–2010	→ 1461 Trabzon (loan)	20	(6)
2010–2011	Diyarbakırspor	8	(0)
2011–2012	Adana Demirspor	19	(1)
2012–2013	1461 Trabzon	45	(3)
2013–2015	Trabzonspor	18	(1)
2014–2015	→ Akhisar Belediyespor (loan)	20	(1)
2015–2021	Akhisar Belediyespor	102	(3)
2021–2022	Adanaspor	14	(0)
2022–2023	Kastamonuspor 1966	16	(0)

International career
2004	Turkey U16	4	(0)
2004–2005	Turkey U17	8	(0)
2005–2006	Turkey U18	2	(0)
2006–2007	Turkey U19	11	(0)
2008	Turkey U20	2	(0)
- * Club domestic league appearances and goals as of 20 May 2023

Kadir Keleş (born 1 January 1988) is a Turkish footballer who plays as a midfielder.

== Professional career ==
On 10 May 2018, Kadir helped Akhisar Belediyespor win their first professional trophy, the 2017–18 Turkish Cup.

== Honours ==
Akhisarspor

- Turkish Cup (1): 2017-18
- Turkish Super Cup: 2018

== Club statistics ==
=== Club ===
Club Performance
Turkey	Season	League		Turkish Cup		Turkish Super Cup		Total
Turkey	Season	App	Goals	App	Goals	App	Goals	App	Goals
1461 Trabzon (loan)
1461 Trabzon (loan)	2009-10	20	6	2	1	0	0	22	7
Gaziantep BB (loan)
Gaziantep BB (loan)	2008-09	26	0	5	0	0	0	31	0
Trabzonspor
Trabzonspor	2007-08	1	0	1	0	0	0	2	0
CAREER TOTAL		32	2	7	2	0	0	39	3
Correct as of 26 September 2009
