= Caner Osmanpaşa =

Turkish footballer

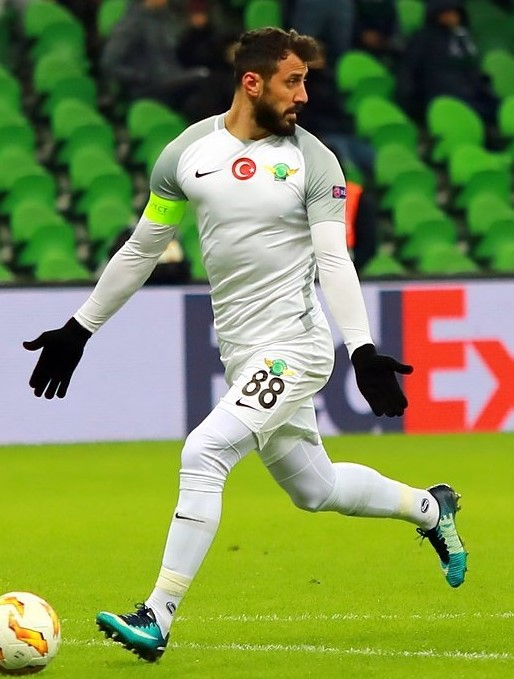
- Osmanpaşa with Akhisarspor in 2018

Personal information
- Date of birth: 15 January 1988 (age 38)
- Place of birth: Trabzon, Turkey
- Height: 1.82 m (5 ft 11 1/2 in)
- Position: Defender

Team information
- Current team: Sarıyer
- Number: 88

Youth career
- 2000–2008: Trabzon Çağlayanspor

Senior career*
Years	Team	Apps	(Gls)
2008–2010	Akçaabat Sebatspor	67	(3)
2010–2012	Orduspor	4	(0)
2012	→ Denizlispor (loan)	16	(2)
2012–2013	1461 Trabzon	27	(1)
2013–2015	Trabzonspor	8	(0)
2014–2015	→ Kayseri Erciyesspor (loan)	26	(1)
2015–2019	Akhisarspor	128	(0)
2019–2024	Sivasspor	143	(7)
2024–2025	Kocaelispor	29	(0)
2025–2026	Çorum	12	(0)
2026–	Sarıyer	14	(0)
- * Club domestic league appearances and goals as of 6 May 2026

Caner Osmanpaşa (born 15 January 1988) is a Turkish footballer who plays as a defender for TFF 1. Lig club Sarıyer.

== Professional career ==
Osmanpaşa is a product of the youth academy of Trabzon Çağlayanspor, and began his senior career with Akçaabat Sebatspor. He moved to Orduspor in Orduspor, and followed that with stints at 1461 Trabzon, Trabzonspor and Akhisarspor. On 10 May 2018, he helped win their first professional trophy, the 2017–18 Turkish Cup.

== Honours ==
Akhisarspor

- Turkish Cup (1): 2017–18

Sivasspor

- Turkish Cup (1): 2021–22
