= Mustafa Akbaş =

Turkish footballer (born 1990)

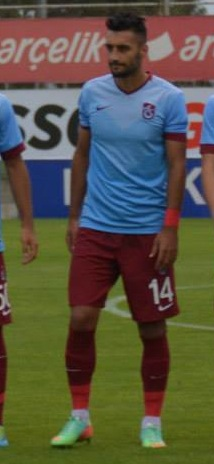
- Mustafa Akbaş with Trabzonspor (September 2014)

Personal information
- Date of birth: 30 May 1990 (age 36)
- Place of birth: Trabzon, Turkey
- Height: 1.88 m (6 ft 2 in)
- Position: Defender

Team information
- Current team: 1461 Trabzon
- Number: 2

Youth career
- 2002–2008: Bahçecikspor
- 2008–2009: Trabzonspor

Senior career*
Years	Team	Apps	(Gls)
2009–2014	1461 Trabzon	118	(4)
2014–2018	Trabzonspor	58	(1)
2015–2016	→ Kayserispor (loan)	28	(0)
2019–2020	Yeni Malatyaspor	29	(0)
2021	Gençlerbirliği	6	(0)
2021–2025	Erzurumspor	106	(3)
2025–	1461 Trabzon	7	(0)

International career
2015	Turkey A2	1	(0)
- * Club domestic league appearances and goals as of 29 November 2025

Mustafa Akbaş (born 30 May 1990) is a Turkish footballer who plays as a defender for TFF 2. Lig club 1461 Trabzon.

== Club career ==
=== Early career ===
Akbas spent time in the youth systems of both Bahcecikspor and Trabzonspor during his youth.

=== 1461 Trabzon ===
In 2009, Akbas was sold by Trabzonspor to affiliate club 1461 Trabzon. He made 118 league appearances with the club, scoring four goals. His league debut came on 24 October 2009 in a 2–0 home win against Erzurumspor. This was also his first start for the club. His first goal came nearly two years later on 16 October 2011 in a 2–1 away loss to Saraykoy 1926. He scored in the 36th minute, making the score 2–1. In the 2011–12 season, he helped his side to promotion to the TFF First League.

=== Trabzonspor ===
In 2014, Akbas was brought back to Trabzonspor. His first league appearance back with Trabzonspor was a 0–0 away draw against Konyaspor on 2 March 2014. His first goal for Trabzonspor came on 21 December 2014 in a 3–3 away draw against Bursaspor. He scored in the 80th minute, making the score 3-3.

=== Kayserispor (Loan) ===
In the summer of 2015, Akbas was loaned out to Kayserispor. He made 28 league appearances on his loan spell. The first of these came on 22 August 2015 in a 1–1 home draw against Konyaspor. He was brought on as a substitute for Srđan Mijailović in the 46th minute.

=== Yeni Malatyaspor ===
After terminating his contract with Trabzonspor, he has joined Süper Lig side Yeni Malatyaspor on 10 January 2019.
