= Abdullah Karmil =

Turkish footballer (born 1988)

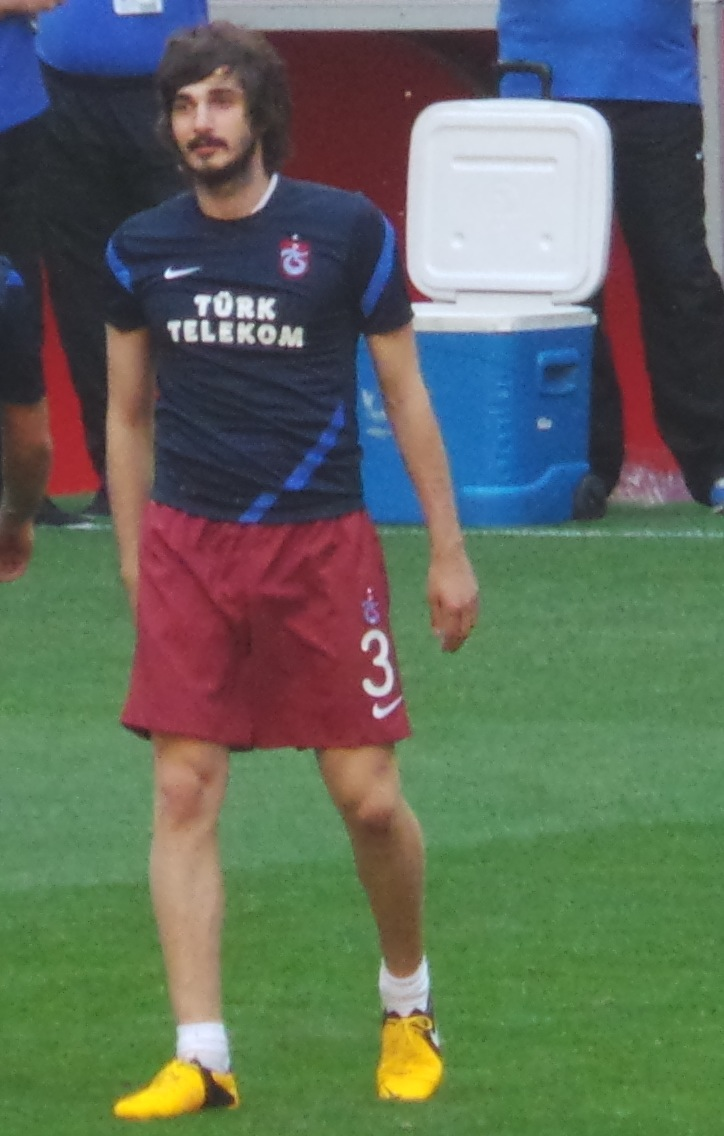

Personal information
- Full name: Abdullah Karmil
- Date of birth: 22 January 1988 (age 38)
- Place of birth: Sarıyer, Turkey
- Positions: Centre back; right back; defensive midfielder

Team information
- Current team: Düzcespor

Youth career
- Trabzonspor

Senior career*
Years	Team	Apps	(Gls)
2008–2010	Trabzonspor	0	(0)
2008–2010	→ 1461 Trabzon (loan)	43	(0)
2010	→ Çorumspor (loan)	14	(0)
2010–2011	Çorumspor	14	(0)
2011–2013	1461 Trabzon	43	(3)
2013	→ Trabzonspor (loan)	3	(0)
2013–2014	Trabzonspor	0	(0)
2013–2014	→ Osmanlıspor (loan)	33	(0)
2014–2015	Adanaspor	14	(1)
2015–2016	Alanyaspor	4	(1)
2016	Kartalspor	5	(0)
2016–2017	Çorum Belediyespor	24	(0)
2018	Sivas Belediyespor	6	(0)
2018–2019	Sarıyer	28	(1)
2019–2020	Bandırmaspor	18	(0)
2020–	Düzcespor	0	(0)

International career
2006	Turkey U18	5	(0)
2006	Turkey U19	3	(0)
2009	Turkey U21	3	(0)
- * Club domestic league appearances and goals as of 15 March 2020

Abdullah Karmil (born 22 January 1988) is a Turkish footballer who plays as a defender for Düzcespor. He made his Süper Lig debut on 23 February 2013.
