= Batuhan Artarslan =

Turkish professional footballer

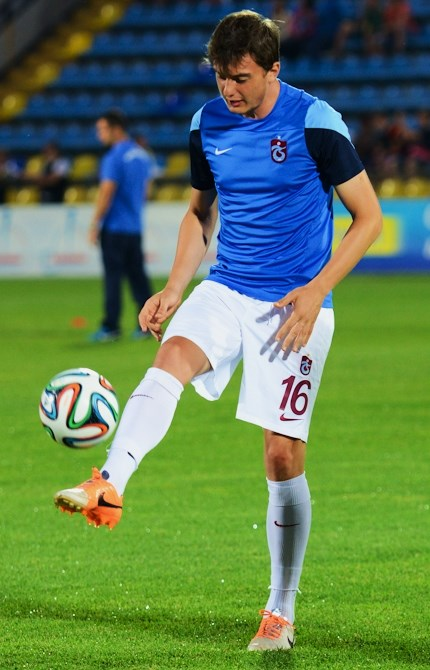

Personal information
- Full name: Hasan Batuhan Artarslan
- Date of birth: 25 May 1994 (age 32)
- Place of birth: Vakfıkebir, Turkey
- Height: 1.89 m (6 ft 2 in)
- Position: Midfielder

Team information
- Current team: Aliağa FK
- Number: 5

Youth career
- 2007–2012: Trabzonspor

Senior career*
Years	Team	Apps	(Gls)
2012–2019	Trabzonspor	13	(0)
2013–2016	→ 1461 Trabzon (loan)	92	(10)
2016–2017	→ Şanlıurfaspor (loan)	26	(5)
2019–2020	Erzurumspor	13	(1)
2020–2021	Ümraniyespor	24	(1)
2021–2025	Erzurumspor	58	(0)
2025–2026	24 Erzincanspor	24	(2)
2026–	Aliağa FK	3	(0)

International career
2016	Turkey U21	2	(0)
- * Club domestic league appearances and goals as of 1 October 2026

Hasan Batuhan Artarslan (born 25 May 1994) is a Turkish professional footballer who plays as a midfielder for TFF 2. Lig club Aliağa FK.

== Professional career ==
A long-time youth product at Trabzonspor, Batuhan spent his early career on loan in the Turkish lower divisions with 1461 Trabzon and Şanlıurfaspor. He formally joined the Trabzonspor senior team in the summer of 2017. Batuhan made his professional debut with Trabzonspor in a 3-1 Süper Lig win over Akhisar Belediyespor on 12 March 2018.
