= Şahin Aygüneş =

Turkish footballer

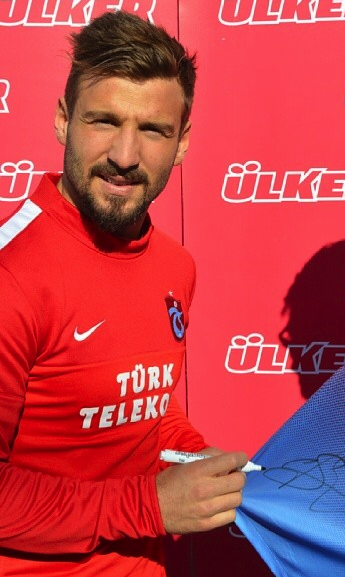
- Aygüneş with Trabzonspor

Personal information
- Date of birth: 1 October 1990 (age 36)
- Place of birth: Ansbach, West Germany
- Height: 1.80 m (5 ft 11 in)
- Position: Forward

Team information
- Current team: Şile Yıldızspor

Youth career
- FV 08 Hockenheim
- Waldhof Mannheim
- 2004–2009: Karlsruher SC

Senior career*
Years	Team	Apps	(Gls)
2008–2009	Karlsruher SC II	5	(0)
2009–2014	Kasımpaşa	73	(12)
2014	Trabzonspor	8	(0)
2014–2016	Antalyaspor	25	(1)
2016	→ Karşıyaka (loan)	11	(1)
2017	Tuzlaspor	11	(2)
2017–2018	SV Sandhausen	9	(1)
2018	Gümüşhanespor	10	(2)
2019	Zonguldak Kömürspor	2	(0)
2019–2020	VfR Mannheim	0	(0)
2020–2021	Bayrampaşa	21	(7)
2021–	Şile Yıldızspor	13	(1)

International career
2006	Turkey U16	8	(1)
2007	Turkey U17	6	(0)
2008	Turkey U18	3	(0)
2009–2011	Turkey U21	20	(4)
- * Club domestic league appearances and goals as of 1 July 2022

Şahin Aygüneş (born 1 October 1990) is a professional footballer who plays as a forward for Şile Yıldızspor. Born in Germany, he represented Turkey at youth international levels.

== Club career ==
Born in Ansbach but raised in Hockenheim, Aygüneş started playing football with local FV 08 Hockenheim. Later he also went through the youth ranks of Waldhof Mannheim and finally Karlsruher SC where he also began his senior career. He moved to the Turkish side from German club Karlsruher SC, the club with whom he began his career. In summer 2009 he signed a five-year contract with Kasımpaşa. At the end of November 2009, he scored the third goal in Kasımpaşa shock 3–1 away at Fenerbahce. The goal came after he was substituted on after only three minutes.

== International career ==
He has dual-nationality and was thus eligible for both Turkish and German national teams.
