= Zeki Ayvaz =

Turkish footballer (born 1989)

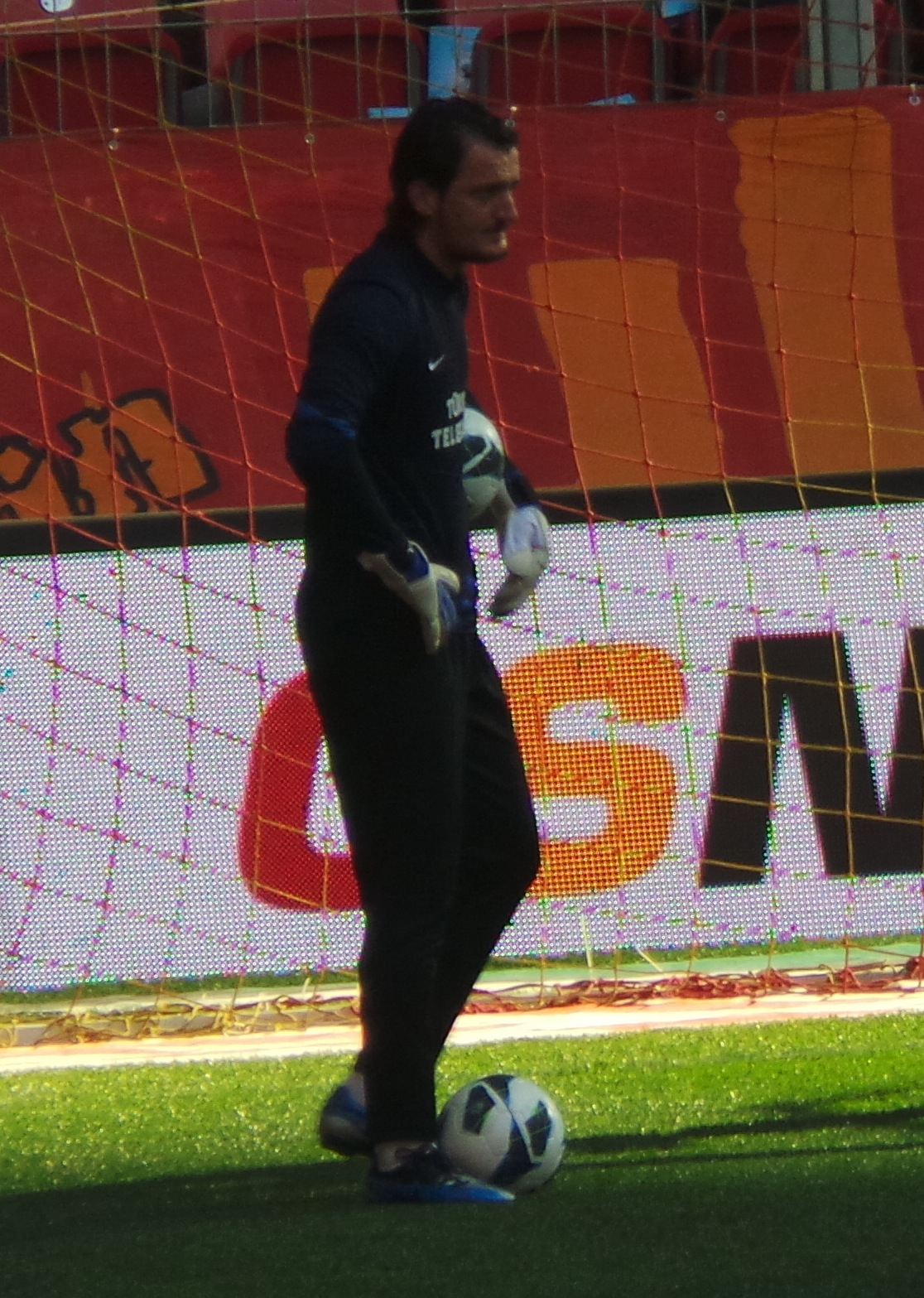
- Ayvaz in 2013

Personal information
- Date of birth: 1 October 1989 (age 37)
- Place of birth: Akçaabat, Turkey
- Height: 1.88 m (6 ft 2 in)
- Position: Goalkeeper

Team information
- Current team: Muş 1984 Muşspor
- Number: 61

Youth career
- 1996–2007: Akçaabat Sebatspor
- 2007–2009: Trabzonspor

Senior career*
Years	Team	Apps	(Gls)
2009–2015	Trabzonspor	1	(0)
2009–2011	→ 1461 Trabzon (loan)	13	(0)
2014	→ Balıkesirspor (loan)	1	(0)
2015	Akhisar Belediyespor	1	(0)
2016	Kartalspor	9	(0)
2016–2018	Denizlispor	17	(0)
2019	Ankara Demirspor	8	(0)
2019–2020	Tarsus İdman Yurdu	1	(0)
2020–2021	Gümüşhanespor	17	(0)
2022	Sancaktepe	4	(0)
2022–	Muş 1984 Muşspor	11	(0)

International career^{‡}
2006	Turkey U18	2	(0)
2008	Turkey U19	1	(0)
2008	Turkey U20	1	(0)
- * Club domestic league appearances and goals as of 13 November 2022 ‡ National team caps and goals as of 27 November 2008

Zeki Ayvaz (born 1 October 1989) is a Turkish footballer who plays as a goalkeeper for the TFF Third League club Muş 1984 Muşspor.
