= Zeki Yavru =

Turkish footballer

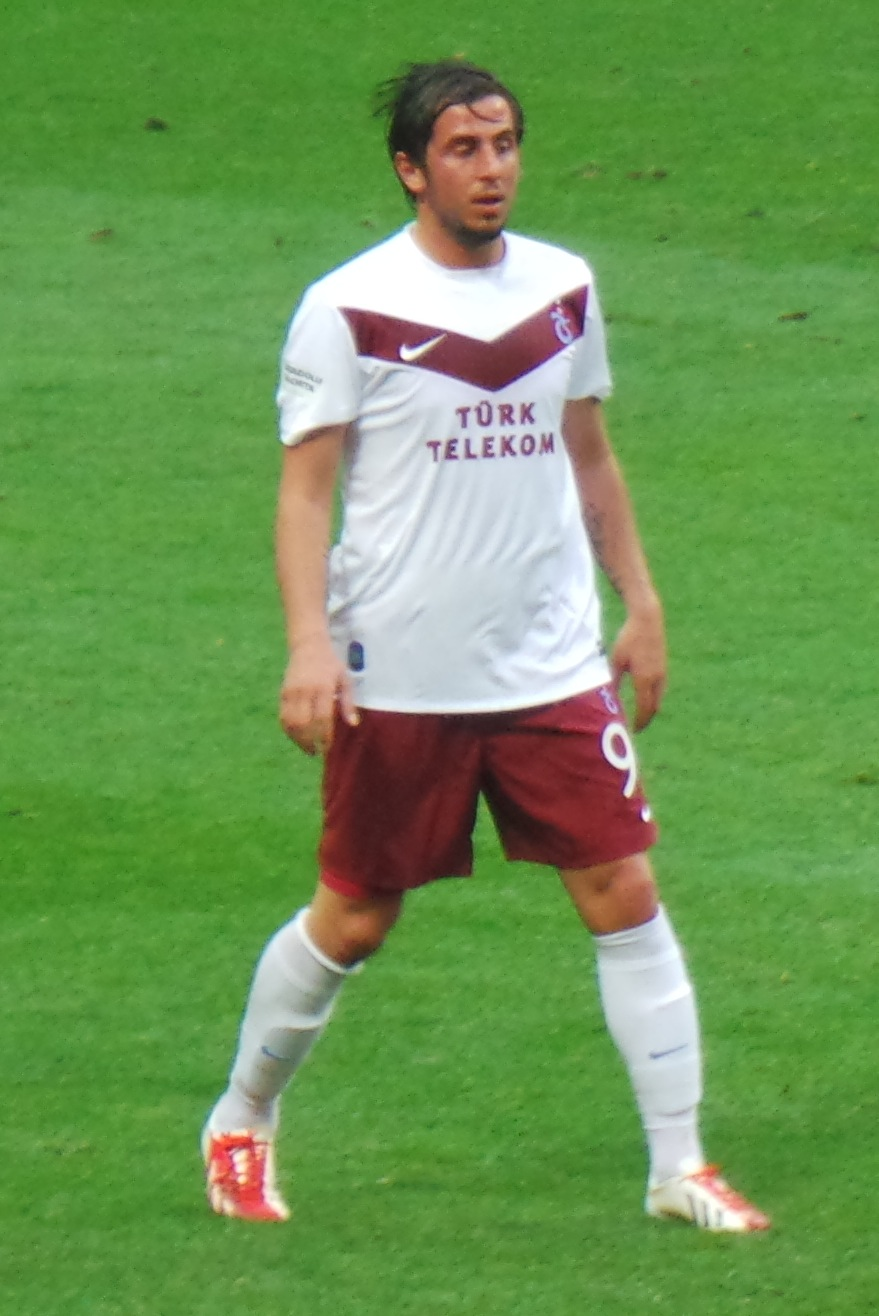

Personal information
- Date of birth: 5 September 1991 (age 35)
- Place of birth: Trabzon, Turkey
- Height: 1.78 m (5 ft 10 in)
- Positions: Right back; central midfielder

Team information
- Current team: Bursaspor

Youth career
- 2002–2007: Trabzon Telekomspor
- 2007–2010: Trabzonspor

Senior career*
Years	Team	Apps	(Gls)
2010–2011	1461 Trabzon	19	(1)
2011–2017	Trabzonspor	50	(1)
2011–2012	→ 1461 Trabzon (loan)	27	(7)
2015–2016	→ Kayserispor (loan)	30	(3)
2017–2018	Gençlerbirliği	21	(0)
2018–2019	Trabzonspor	1	(0)
2019	Akhisarspor	12	(2)
2019–2020	Denizlispor	29	(0)
2020–2021	Yeni Malatyaspor	32	(2)
2021–2022	Giresunspor	31	(0)
2022–2026	Samsunspor	122	(5)
2026–	Bursaspor		

International career
2013	Turkey A2	3	(0)
- * Club domestic league appearances and goals as of 10 June 2026

Zeki Yavru (born 5 September 1991) is a Turkish footballer who plays as a right back for Turkish 1. Lig club Bursaspor.

== Career statistics ==
As of match played 18 May 2024

Appearances and goals by club, season and competition
Club	Season	League			Cup		Europe		Other		Total	
Club	Season	Division	Apps	Goals	Apps	Goals	Apps	Goals	Apps	Goals	Apps	Goals
1461 Trabzon	2009–10	TFF Second League	13	0	—		—		—		13	0
1461 Trabzon	2010–11	TFF Second League	8	1	—		—		—		8	1
1461 Trabzon	Total		21	1	—		—		—		21	1
Trabzonspor	2012–13	Süper Lig	7	0	4	0	—		—		11	0
Trabzonspor	2013–14	Süper Lig	17	1	1	0	8	0	—		26	1
Trabzonspor	2014–15	Süper Lig	10	0	0	0	5	0	—		15	0
Trabzonspor	2015–16	Süper Lig	—		—		1	0	—		1	0
Trabzonspor	2016–17	Süper Lig	17	0	6	0	—		—		23	0
Trabzonspor	Total		51	1	11	0	14	0	—		76	1
1461 Trabzon (loan)	2011–12	TFF Second League	27	7	—		—		—		27	7
Kayserispor (loan)	2015–16	Süper Lig	30	3	5	1	—		—		35	4
Gençlerbirliği	2017–18	Süper Lig	21	0	6	0	—		—		27	0
Trabzonspor	2018–19	Süper Lig	1	0	3	0	—		—		4	0
Akhisarspor	2018–19	Süper Lig	12	2	6	0	—		—		18	2
Denizlispor	2019–20	Süper Lig	29	0	4	0	—		—		33	0
Yeni Malatyaspor	2020–21	Süper Lig	32	2	2	1	—		—		34	3
Giresunspor	2021–22	Süper Lig	31	0	1	0	—		—		32	0
Samsunspor	2022–23	TFF First League	31	2	1	0	—		—		32	2
Samsunspor	2023–24	Süper Lig	28	1	0	0	—		—		28	1
Samsunspor	Total		59	3	1	0	—		—		60	3
Career total			314	19	39	2	14	0	0	0	367	21
