= Mustafa Yumlu =

Turkish footballer

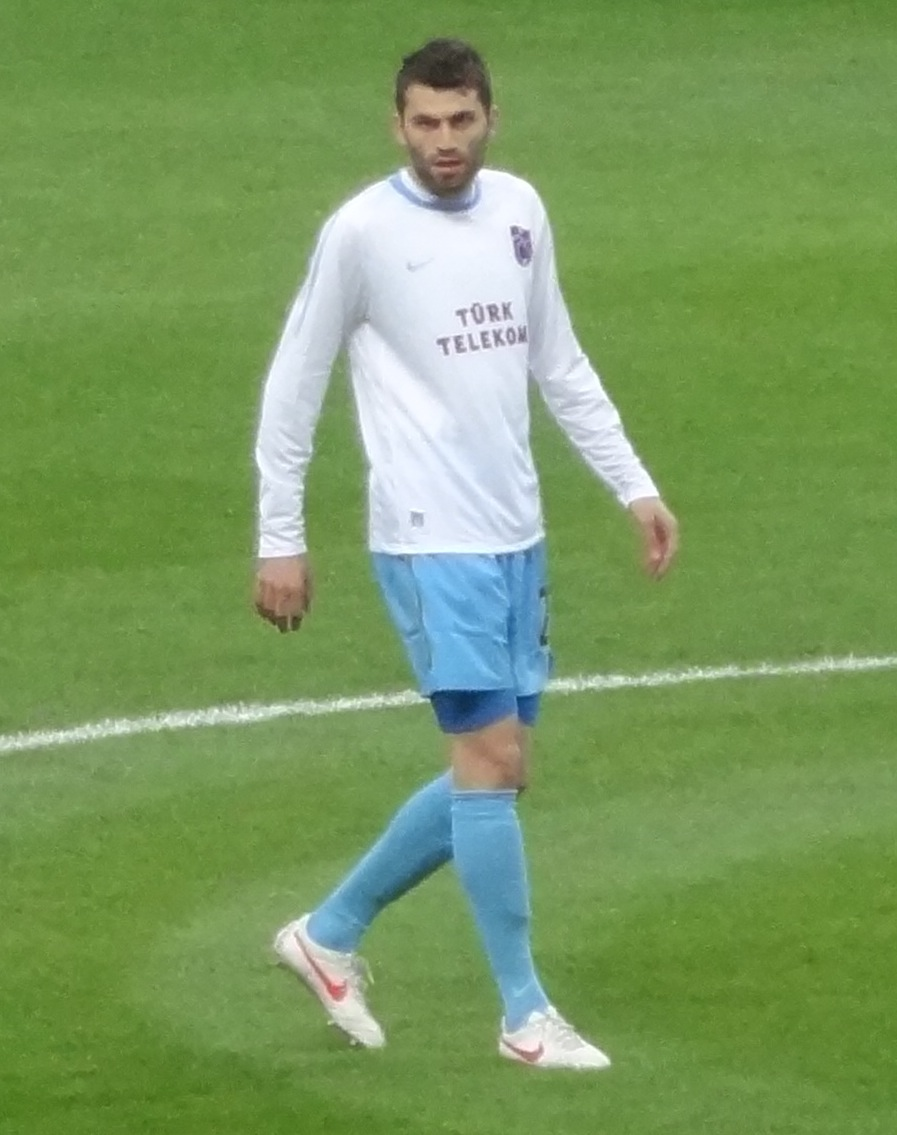
- Yumlu in 2012

Personal information
- Date of birth: 25 September 1987 (age 39)
- Place of birth: Trabzon, Turkey
- Height: 1.91 m (6 ft 3 in)
- Position: Centre-back

Team information
- Current team: BB Erzurumspor
- Number: 22

Youth career
- 1998–1999: Aydınlıspor
- 1999–2003: Trabzonspor
- 2003–2006: Idmanocağı

Senior career*
Years	Team	Apps	(Gls)
2006–2008	Arsinspor	31	(4)
2006–2007	→ 1461 Trabzon (loan)	29	(1)
2008–2017	Trabzonspor	115	(7)
2008–2010	→ 1461 Trabzon (loan)	57	(6)
2015	→ Eskişehirspor (loan)	13	(0)
2017–2019	Akhisar Belediyespor	53	(8)
2019–2021	Denizlispor	55	(3)
2021–	BB Erzurumspor	149	(18)

International career^{‡}
2011	Turkey A2	1	(0)
- * Club domestic league appearances and goals as of 5 May 2026 ‡ National team caps and goals as of 10 May 2018

Mustafa Yumlu (born 25 September 1987) is a Turkish professional footballer who plays as a centre-back for BB Erzurumspor in the TFF First League.

== Career ==
Yumlu began his footballing career as an eleven-year-old in Aydinlispor's youth team. He was transferred to Trabzonspor the following year, where he played in their youth teams until 2003. He joined another local club, Idmanocağı, and competed with them for three years before joining Arsinspor in 2006. Yumlu was loaned out immediately to 1461 Trabzon, where he competed in 29 matches, scoring one goal. He returned to Arsinspor the following season, featuring in 34 matches while scoring four goals. Trabzonspor transferred him for the second time in 2008, but he was immediately loaned out to 1461 Trabzon for the second time as well. Yumlu spent two years on loan at 1461 Trabzon before joining up with the Trabzonspor senior squad at the start of 2010–11 season. He competed in six friendlies, scoring one goal.

On 10 May 2018, Yumlu helped Akhisar Belediyespor win their first professional trophy, the 2017–18 Turkish Cup.

== Honours ==
Akhisarspor

- Turkish Cup: 2017-18
- Turkish Super Cup: 2018
