= Emre Güral =

Turkish footballer

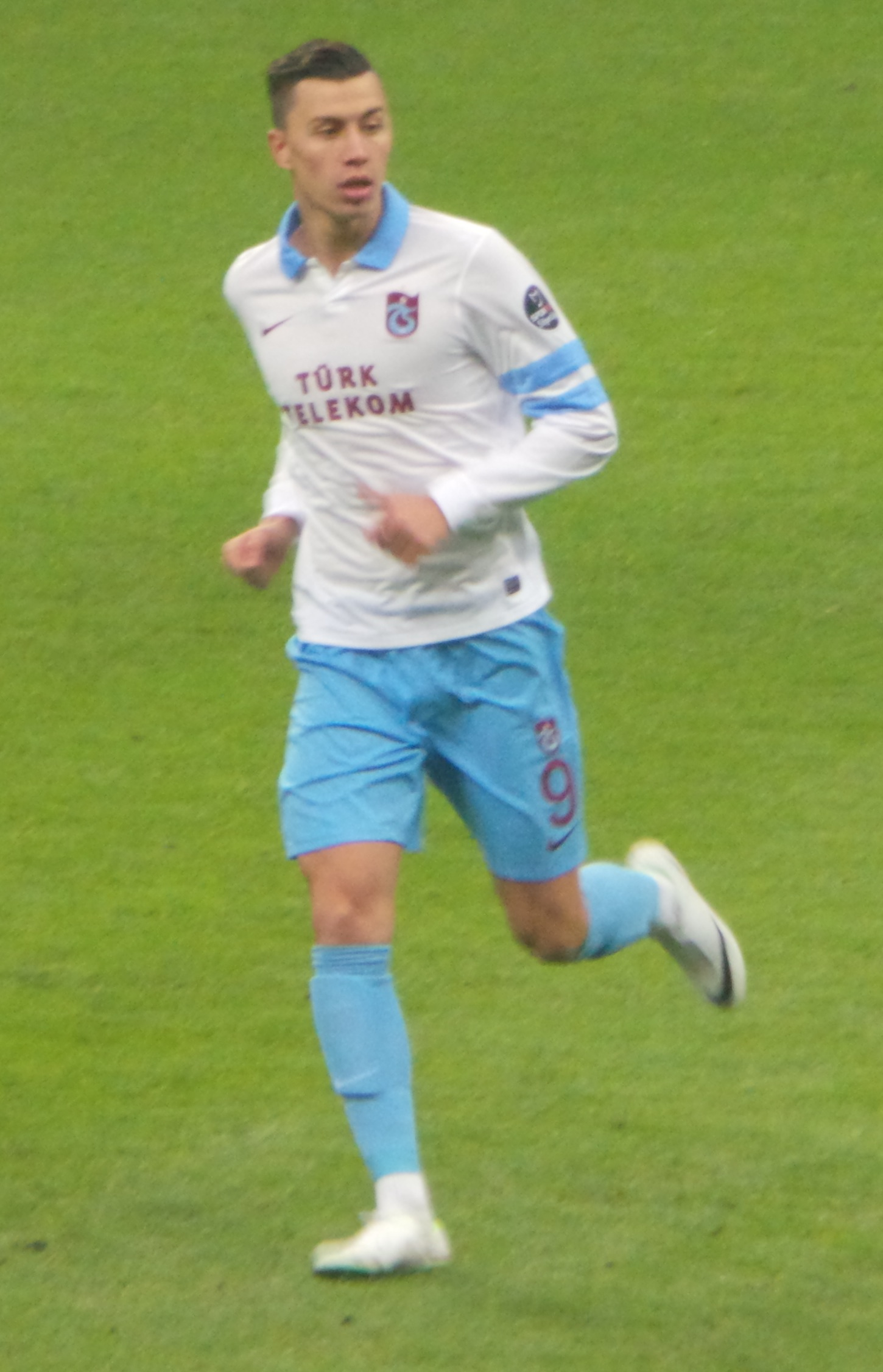
- Güral with Trabzonspor

Personal information
- Full name: Emre Güral
- Date of birth: 5 April 1989 (age 37)
- Place of birth: Offenbach am Main, West Germany
- Height: 1.88 m (6 ft 2 in)
- Position: Forward

Youth career
- Eintracht Frankfurt
- Greuther Fürth
- Jahn Regensburg

Senior career*
Years	Team	Apps	(Gls)
2008–2009	Jahn Regensburg	10	(0)
2009–2011	SV 07 Elversberg	50	(14)
2011–2012	Bucaspor	24	(9)
2012–2015	Trabzonspor	30	(7)
2015–2016	Eskişehirspor	29	(11)
2016–2018	Antalyaspor	34	(5)
2018	Alanyaspor	2	(0)
2019	Eskişehirspor	23	(12)
2020	Türkgücü München	1	(0)
2020–2021	Ankaragücü	26	(4)
2022	Crotone	1	(0)

International career
2012	Turkey A2	7	(2)
- * Club domestic league appearances and goals as of 1 July 2022

Emre Güral (born 5 April 1989) is a professional footballer who plays as a forward. Born in Germany, he represented Turkey at 'A2' international level.

== Club career ==
On 29 March 2022, Güral joined the Italian Serie B club Crotone until the end of the season.
