= Giray Kaçar =

Turkish footballer (born 1985)

Personal information
- Full name: Remzi Giray Kaçar
- Date of birth: 15 March 1985 (age 41)
- Place of birth: Karaman, Turkey
- Height: 1.87 m (6 ft 1 1/2 in)
- Position: Centre back

Youth career
- 1993–2004: Gençlerbirliği

Senior career*
Years	Team	Apps	(Gls)
2004–2008	Hacettepe	114	(8)
2008–2014	Trabzonspor	123	(5)
2014	Antalyaspor	11	(0)
2014–2015	Çaykur Rizespor	28	(1)
2015–2016	Göztepe	15	(1)

International career
2008	Turkey	1	(0)
- * Club domestic league appearances and goals as of 24 August 2015

Remzi Giray Kaçar (born 15 March 1985) is a former Turkish footballer.

== Career ==
Giray Kaçar previously played for Gençlerbirliği at the youth level, before transferring to Trabzonspor in 2008.

He was called up to the national team on 6 February 2008, for a match against Sweden. He has also played 4 times for the U21 national team.

== Honours ==
Trabzonspor

- Turkish Cup: 2009–10
- Turkish Super Cup: 2010
