= Aykut Akgün =

Turkish footballer (born 1987)

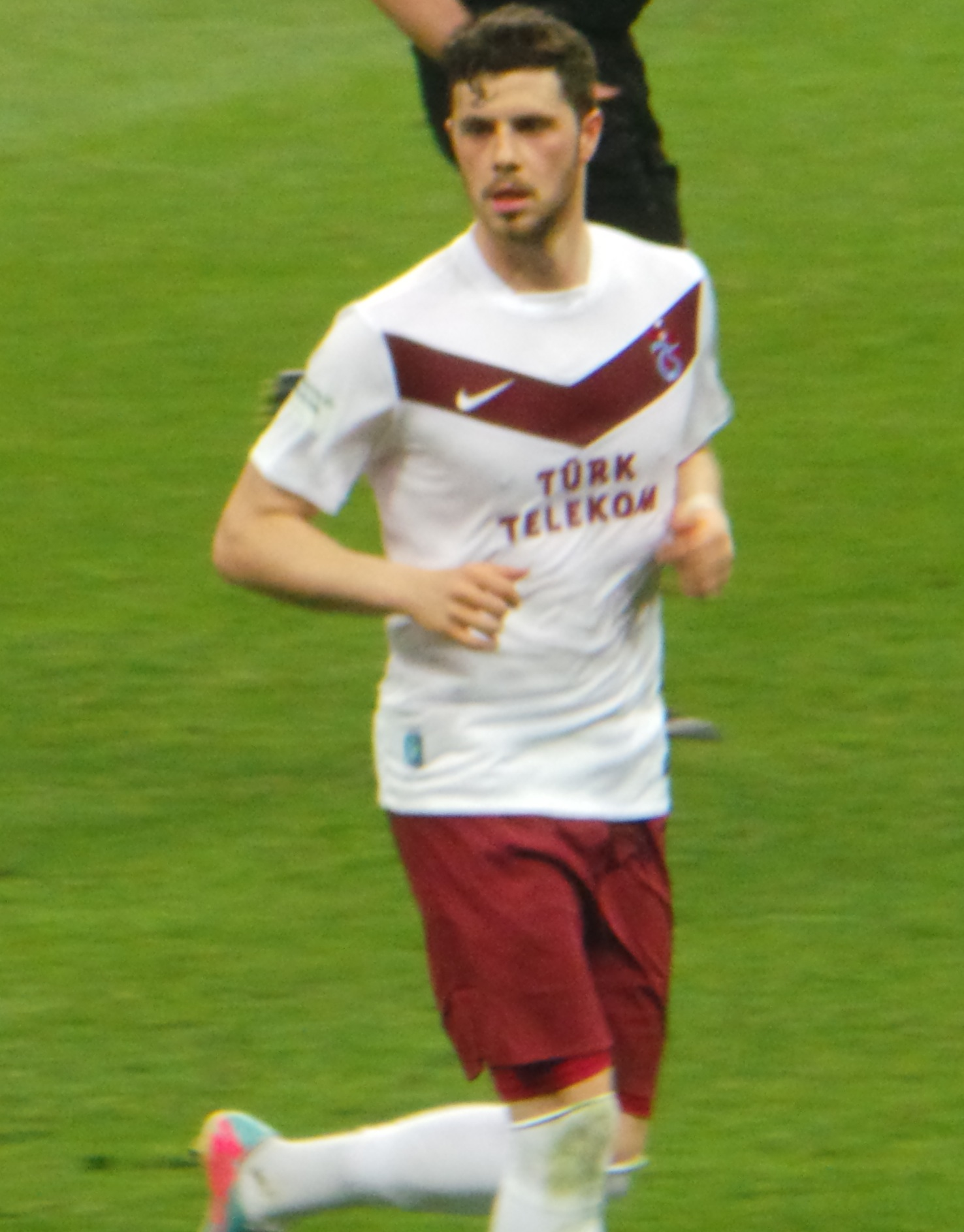

Personal information
- Date of birth: 18 September 1987 (age 39)
- Place of birth: Karlsruhe, Germany
- Height: 1.87 m (6 ft 2 in)
- Position: Attacking midfielder

Youth career
- 2003–2006: Trabzonspor

Senior career*
Years	Team	Apps	(Gls)
2006–2007	Trabzonspor	0	(0)
2006	→ Maltepespor (loan)	2	(0)
2007	Zeytinburnuspor	4	(0)
2007–2008	Karlsruher SC II	16	(1)
2008–2009	Giresunspor	28	(0)
2009–2011	Karşıyaka	52	(1)
2011–2014	Trabzonspor	47	(1)
2014	→ Çaykur Rizespor (loan)	5	(0)
2014–2015	Karabükspor	17	(0)
2015–2016	Adana Demirspor	14	(0)
2016–2018	Eskişehirspor	41	(0)
2018–2019	Şanlıurfaspor	30	(2)
2019–2021	Bursaspor	52	(0)
2022	Çorum	8	(0)
2022–2023	Nilüfer Belediye FK	0	(0)

International career
2006	Turkey U20	1	(0)
2011	Turkey A2	3	(0)
- * Club domestic league appearances and goals

Aykut Akgün (born 18 September 1987) is a Turkish former professional footballer. He last played as attacking midfielder for an amateur side Nilüfer Belediye FK.
