= Hüseyin Avni Aker Stadium =

Turkish football stadium

Coordinates: 41°0′14″N 39°42′18″E

Hüseyin Avni Aker Stadyumu
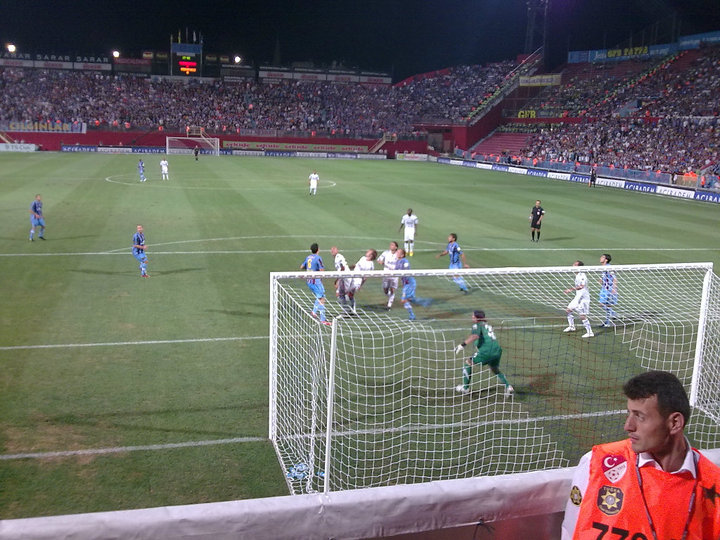
- Interactive map of Hüseyin Avni Aker Stadyumu
- Location: Trabzon, Turkey
- Capacity: 24,169
- Surface: Natural grass

Construction
- Opened: 1951
- Renovated: 2010
- Expanded: 1981
- Closed: 2017
- Demolished: 2018

Tenant
- Trabzonspor

Hüseyin Avni Aker Stadium was the stadium located in Trabzon, where Trabzonspor played its matches until January 26, 2017. The stadium also served as the main stadium in the "1st Black Sea Games" and the 2011 European Youth Olympic Games. It is also one of the stadiums where the 2013 FIFA U-20 World Cup was held.

The stadium was built in 1951 with a spectator capacity of 2,400 people. Hüseyin Avni Aker Stadium has subsequently undergone many repairs. The most important of these renovations was made in 1981, and in 1994, the stadium's marathon tribune was covered and the field was illuminated. With the capacity increase of +1,200 in 2008 and +260 in 2010, the capacity of 20,800 people was increased to 24,169; It remained in this capacity until its closure. Additionally, the marathon tribune was uncovered during the repairs carried out in 2008.
