= Ondřej Čelůstka =

Czech professional footballer

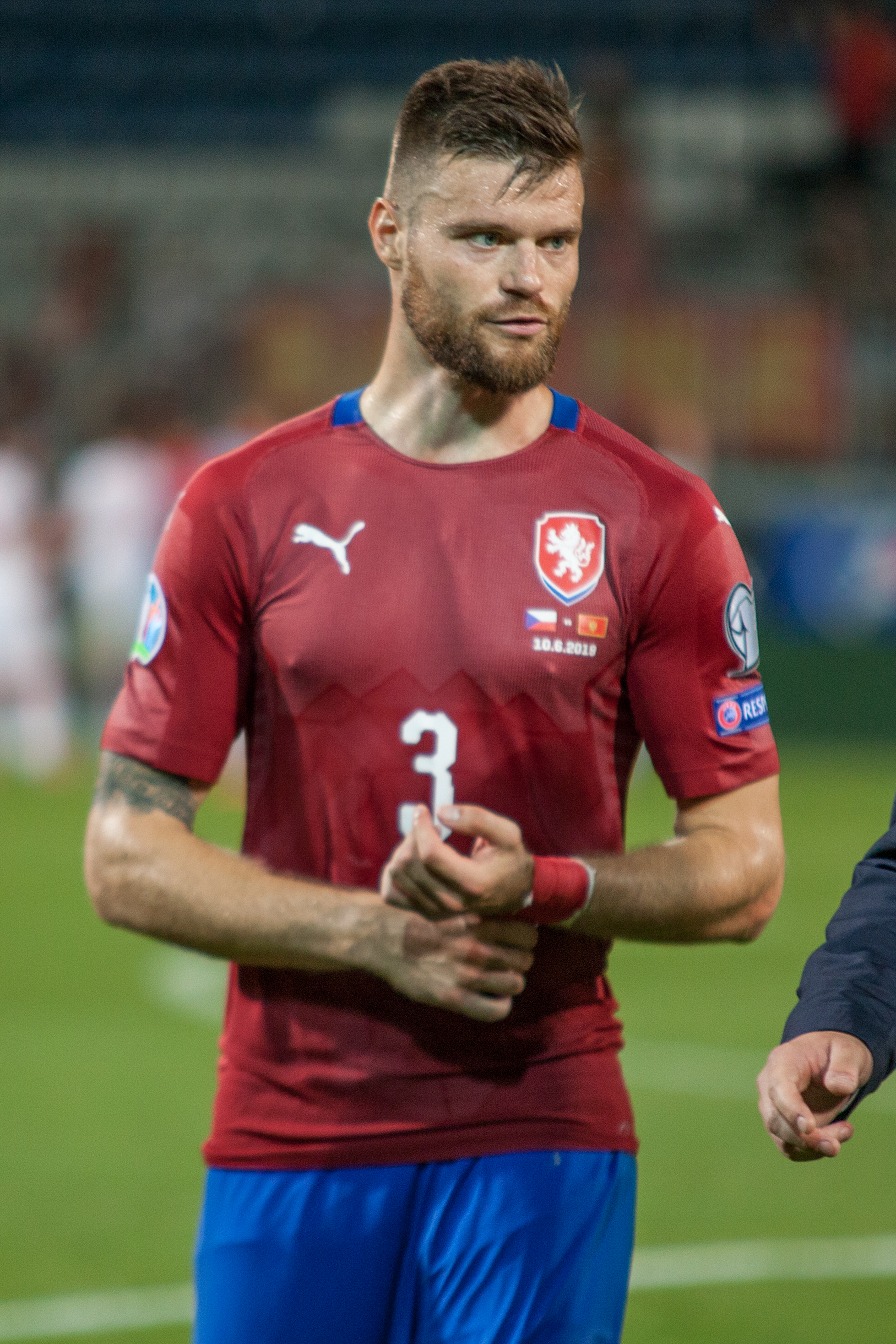
- Čelůstka playing for Czech Republic national team in 2019

Personal information
- Full name: Ondřej Čelůstka
- Date of birth: 18 June 1989 (age 37)
- Place of birth: Zlín, Czechoslovakia
- Height: 1.86 m (6 ft 1 in)
- Position: Defender

Youth career
- 1996–2007: Fastav Zlín

Senior career*
Years	Team	Apps	(Gls)
2007–2009	Fastav Zlín	24	(3)
2009–2011	Slavia Prague	41	(3)
2010	→ Palermo (loan)	1	(0)
2011–2014	Trabzonspor	55	(1)
2013–2014	→ Sunderland (loan)	21	(0)
2014–2015	1. FC Nürnberg	31	(0)
2015–2020	Antalyaspor	142	(1)
2020–2023	Sparta Prague	37	(2)
2021	→ Sparta Prague B	5	(0)
2023–2025	Bodrum	56	(1)

International career
2008	Czech Republic U19	2	(0)
2009	Czech Republic U20	4	(0)
2009–2011	Czech Republic U21	18	(1)
2013–2021	Czech Republic	33	(3)
- * Club domestic league appearances and goals

Ondřej Čelůstka (born 18 June 1989; pronounced [ˈondr̝ɛj ˈtʃɛluːstka]) is a Czech former professional footballer who played as a defender.

He was a member of the Czech Republic national team from 2013 to 2021 and represented the under-21 team at the 2011 UEFA European Under-21 Football Championship.

== Club career ==
=== Early football career ===
Čelůstka began his career with Fastav Zlín, making his professional debut in the Czech First League during the 2007–08 season, and then playing more regularly in the following one. His good performances ensured him a regular place with Czech leading club Slavia Prague, with whom he made fourteen appearances and a goal in the first half of the 2009–10 Czech First League.

On 1 February 2010, Čelůstka signed with Serie A outfit U.S. Città di Palermo on loan, with an option to sign him permanently at the end of season. He was awarded the number #89 jersey from the rosanero. He made his league Serie A debut in 2010, coming as a substitute for Marco Calderoni in the second half during a 3–1 home victory against Bologna.

=== Trabzonspor ===
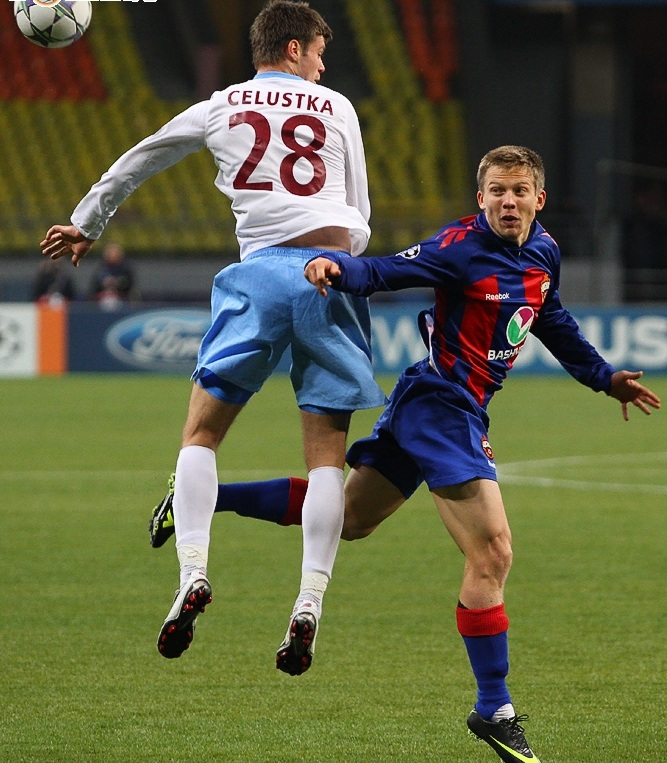
Čelůstka playing for Trabzonspor against CSKA Moscow in 2011

On 8 July 2011, Čelůstka moved to Turkish club Trabzonspor for a transfer fee of €900,000 and signed a five-year contract. The club gave him the number 28 jersey.

During a game against Inter Milan at the San Siro, Čelůstka scored the only goal of the game in a 1–0 away win for Trabzonspor in the 2011–12 UEFA Champions League.

==== Loan to Sunderland ====
Čelůstka joined English Premier League club Sunderland on a season-long loan deal on 12 August 2013. He made his Premier League debut at the Stadium of Light five days later, hitting a half volley from 30 yards which was saved by Maarten Stekelenburg as the team began the season with a 1–0 defeat to Fulham. Čelůstka was an unused substitute as Sunderland lost 3–1 to Manchester City in the 2014 Football League Cup Final at Wembley Stadium on 2 March.

=== Later career ===
On 24 August 2014, Čelůstka joined 1. FC Nürnberg of the 2. Bundesliga on a free transfer after being released from Trabzonspor.

On 31 July 2020, Čelůstka joined Sparta Prague of the Czech First League on a free transfer after being released from Antalyaspor.

On 6 July 2023, Čelůstka joined Bodrum of the TFF First League on a free transfer after being released from Sparta Prague.

On 16 June 2025, Čelůstka announced on his social media end of his career due to health reasons.

== International career ==
Čelůstka represented the various Czech Republic youth football teams that ranged from U19 until U21. His performances at the 2011 UEFA European Under-21 Football Championship saw him named in the Team of the Tournament. On 15 November 2013, he debuted for the senior team in a 2–0 victory against Canada, scored after just three minutes.

== Career statistics ==
=== Club ===
As of 16 June 2021

Appearances and goals by club, season and competition
Club	Season	League			National Cup		League Cup		Continental		Other		Total	
Club	Season	Division	Apps	Goals	Apps	Goals	Apps	Goals	Apps	Goals	Apps	Goals	Apps	Goals
Fastav Zlín	2007–08	Fortuna Liga	2	0	—		—		—		—		2	0
Fastav Zlín	2008–09	Fortuna Liga	22	3	0	0	—		—		—		22	3
Fastav Zlín	Total		24	3	0	0	—		—		—		24	3
Slavia Prague	2009–10	Fortuna Liga	13	1	0	0	—		9	0	—		22	1
Slavia Prague	2010–11	Fortuna Liga	28	2	0	0	—		—		—		28	2
Slavia Prague	Total		41	3	0	0	—		9	0	—		50	3
Palermo (loan)	2009–10	Serie A	1	0	0	0	—		—		—		1	0
Trabzonspor	2011–12	Süper Lig	36	1	2	0	—		11	1	—		49	2
Trabzonspor	2012–13	Süper Lig	19	0	6	0	—		2	0	—		27	0
Trabzonspor	2013–14	Süper Lig	—		—		—		4	0	—		4	0
Trabzonspor	Total		55	1	8	0	—		17	1	—		80	2
Sunderland (loan)	2013–14	Premier League	21	0	3	0	3	0	—		—		27	0
1. FC Nürnberg	2014–15	2. Bundesliga	31	0	0	0	—		—		—		31	0
Antalyaspor	2015–16	Süper Lig	30	0	6	0	—		—		—		36	0
Antalyaspor	2016–17	Süper Lig	34	0	1	0	—		—		—		35	0
Antalyaspor	2017–18	Süper Lig	30	0	1	0	—		—		—		31	0
Antalyaspor	2018–19	Süper Lig	24	0	2	0	—		—		—		26	0
Antalyaspor	2019–20	Süper Lig	24	1	4	0	—		—		—		28	1
Antalyaspor	Total		142	1	14	0	—		—		—		156	1
Sparta Prague	2020–21	Fortuna Liga	28	1	3	0	—		2	0	—		33	1
Career total			343	9	28	0	3	0	28	1	0	0	402	10

=== International goals ===
Scores and results list Czech Republic's goal tally first, score column indicates score after each Čelůstka goal.

List of international goals scored by Ondřej Čelůstka
No.	Date	Venue	Opponent	Score	Result	Competition
1.	15 November 2013	Andrův stadion, Olomouc, Czech Republic	Canada	1–0	2–0	Friendly
2.	14 November 2019	Doosan Arena, Plzeň, Czech Republic	Kosovo	2–1	2–1	UEFA Euro 2020 qualification
3.	8 June 2021	Stadion Letná, Prague, Czech Republic	Albania	3–1	3–1	Friendly

== Honours ==
Sunderland

- Football League Cup runner-up: 2013–14

Sparta Prague

- Czech First League: 2022–23

Czech Republic U21

- UEFA European Under-21 Championship bronze: 2011
