= Gustavo Colman =

Argentine footballer

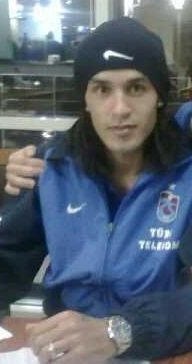
- Colman with Trabzonspor

Personal information
- Full name: Gustavo Alejandro Colman
- Date of birth: 19 April 1985 (age 41)
- Place of birth: Pilar, Argentina
- Height: 1.75 m (5 ft 9 in)
- Position: Midfielder

Youth career
- 1998–2000: Platense
- 2000–2003: Chacarita Juniors

Senior career*
Years	Team	Apps	(Gls)
2003–2006	Chacarita Juniors	29	(2)
2006–2008	Beerschot	35	(2)
2008–2015	Trabzonspor	152	(19)
2015–2017	Rosario Central	56	(1)
Total		272	(24)
- * Club domestic league appearances and goals

Gustavo Alejandro Colman (born 19 April 1985) is an Argentine former professional footballer who played as a midfielder.

== Career ==
=== Chacarita Juniors ===
Born in Pilar, Buenos Aires, Colman started his career at Chacarita Juniors in the Primera División Argentina in 2003 but at the end of the 2003–2004 season Los Funebreros were relegated to the Argentine 2nd division.

=== Beerschot ===
In 2006, Colman was signed by K.F.C. Germinal Beerschot, who ultimately bought his rights in March 2007 for €300,000. with Chacarita Juniors retaining 20% of the player's economic rights. At the Belgian club, Colman quickly obtained a place in the starting eleven and his team finished seventh in the 2006-07 Belgian First Division season.

=== Trabzonspor ===
On 22 May 2008, Colman signed a five-year contract with Trabzonspor, for a €2.3 million transfer fee. In the 2008–09 Turkish Süper Lig season he played 26 games and scored 4 goals (1 penalty) for Trabzonspor. In August 2008, three months after his signing with Trabzonspor, his former club Chacarita Juniors informed FIFA that Trabzonspor had not deposited the solidarity contribution to Chacarita Juniors as well as the buy-out fee of the 20% rights. In June 2009, Trabzonspor informed FIFA of its willingness to pay the solidarity contribution, requesting to do so in installments. However, the first installment was not deposited in July, thus the FIFA Dispute Resolution Chamber passed a decision on 26 February 2010 ordering Trabzonspor to pay €80,500. The decision was delivered several months later. However, partial ownership for the footballer was not recognized by FIFA. On 22 June 2011, Colman's contract was extended by the club for a further three years, until the end of 2015–16 Süper Lig season. Colman's reported salary was €1,155,000 per year.

== Honours ==
Trabzonspor

- Turkish Cup: 2009–10
- Turkish Super Cup: 2010
