= Onur Kıvrak =

Turkish footballer

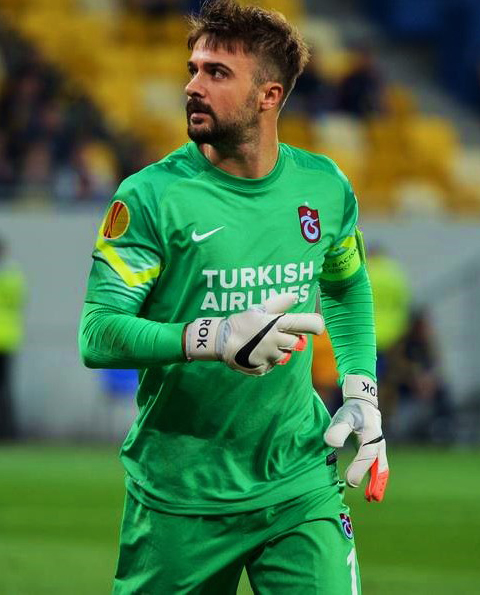
- Kıvrak in 2014

Personal information
- Full name: Onur Recep Kıvrak
- Date of birth: 1 January 1988 (age 38)
- Place of birth: Alaşehir, Turkey
- Height: 1.87 m (6 ft 2 in)
- Position: Goalkeeper

Youth career
- 1999–2004: Yeşilova S.K.

Senior career*
Years	Team	Apps	(Gls)
2004–2008	Karşıyaka	34	(0)
2008–2019	Trabzonspor	203	(0)
Total		237	(0)

International career^{‡}
2005	Turkey U17	3	(0)
2005–2006	Turkey U18	4	(0)
2006–2007	Turkey U19	10	(0)
2007–2009	Turkey U21	11	(0)
2010–2017	Turkey	13	(0)
- * Club domestic league appearances and goals as of 6 February 2019 ‡ National team caps and goals as of 6 February 2019

Onur Recep Kıvrak (born 1 January 1988) is a Turkish former professional footballer who played as a goalkeeper. He played for Trabzonspor before his announcement of retirement from professional football in January 2019.

Although he does not necessarily claim, he is known in Turkish football environment as "Kelebek" (lit. 'Butterfly').

== Club career ==
Kıvrak signed for Trabzonspor on 15 January 2008. On 6 December 2013, Kıvrak renewed his contract on 2.5€m annual salary, keeping him at the club until the end of 2017–18 season.

On 2 October 2014, during Europa League match against Legia Warsaw Kıvrak tore cruciate ligaments in his left knee and was subbed off. 15 days after the injury, Kıvrak underwent knee surgery and was ruled out for the rest of 2014–15 season. He could return to trainings on 8 May 2015.

Contract between Trabzonspor and Kıvrak was mutually terminated on 7 January 2019. Kıvrak announced to local media in Trabzon that he will retire from professional football on 9 January 2019. He mentioned that he will move to İzmir and that he will never return to Trabzon, in an interview to local newspaper. He was linked with local İzmir clubs Altay S.K. and Karşıyaka S.K. during 2019 winter transfer window.

== International career ==
Onur made his debut in the 2–0 friendly win against Northern Ireland on 26 May 2010, having worked his way through the youth teams at U-16, U-17, U-18, U-19, and U-21 level.

He was part of the Turkey national team for Euro 2016.

== Career statistics ==
=== Club ===
Appearances and goals by club, season and competition
Club	Season	League			Cup^{1}		Europe^{2}		Other^{3}		Total	
Division	Apps	Goals	Apps	Goals	Apps	Goals	Apps	Goals	Apps	Goals	Apps	Goals
Karşıyaka S.K.	2004–05	TFF 2. Lig	1	0	0	0	—		—		1	0
Karşıyaka S.K.	2005–06	TFF 2. Lig	16	0	0	0	—		—		16	0
Karşıyaka S.K.	2006–07	TFF 1. Lig	2	0	0	0	—		—		2	0
Karşıyaka S.K.	2007–08	TFF 1. Lig	15	0	0	0	—		—		15	0
Karşıyaka S.K.	Total		34	0	0	0	—		—		34	0
Trabzonspor	2007–08	Süper Lig	3	0	1	0	0	0	—		4	0
Trabzonspor	2008–09	Süper Lig	0	0	2	0	—		—		2	0
Trabzonspor	2009–10	Süper Lig	19	0	8	0	0	0	—		27	0
Trabzonspor	2010–11	Süper Lig	25	0	1	0	2	0	1	0	29	0
Trabzonspor	2011–12	Süper Lig	0	0	2	0	1	0	—		3	0
Trabzonspor	2012–13	Süper Lig	30	0	4	0	2	0	—		36	0
Trabzonspor	2013–14	Süper Lig	32	0	0	0	14	0	—		46	0
Trabzonspor	2014–15	Süper Lig	4	0	0	0	4	0	—		8	0
Trabzonspor	2015–16	Süper Lig	20	0	3	0	3	0	—		26	0
Trabzonspor	2016–17	Süper Lig	32	0	0	0	—		—		32	0
Trabzonspor	2017–18	Süper Lig	26	0	0	0	—		—		26	0
Trabzonspor	2018–19	Süper Lig	12	0	0	0	—		—		12	0
Trabzonspor	Total		203	0	21	0	26	0	1	0	251	0
Career total			237	0	21	0	26	0	1	0	285	0

- 1.Includes Turkish Cup.
- 2.Includes UEFA Champions League and UEFA Cup/Europa League.
- 3.Includes Turkish Super Cup.

=== International ===
Appearances and goals by national team and year
National team	Year	Apps	Goals
Turkey
Turkey	2010	3	0
Turkey	2012	1	0
Turkey	2013	3	0
Turkey	2014	5	0
Turkey	2015	0	0
Turkey	2016	0	0
Turkey	2017	1	0
Total		13	0

== Honours ==
=== Trabzonspor ===
- Turkish Cup (1): 2009–10
- Turkish Super Cup (1): 2010
