= 1461 Trabzon =

Turkish football club

- Full name: 1461 Trabzon Kulübü
- Founded: 1998; 28 years ago as Değirmenderespor; 2008; 18 years ago as Trabzon Karadenizspor
- Ground: Ahmet Suat Özyazıcı Stadium, Trabzon
- Capacity: 1,200
- Chairman: Şaban Bülbül
- Manager: Fikret Acuner
- League: Turkish Regional Amateur League

1461 Trabzon is a professional Turkish football club located in the city of Trabzon. Formed in 1998 as Değirmenderespor, the club changed its name to Trabzon Karadenizspor in 2008. The club colours are maroon, blue and white.

== History ==
The club was founded in 1998 as Değirmenderespor and played in the Trabzon amateur league. After the club gained promotion to the 2.Lig in 2008, Trabzonspor bought the club as a local affiliate and rebranded the team Trabzon Karadenizspor. Because of this, the club is mostly made up of Trabzonspor A2 players on loan or former Trabzonspor A2 players.

The reason for the number 1461 in front of the club's name is that in the year 1461 Empire of Trebizond was conquered by the Ottoman Empire.

In the 2012–13 Turkish Cup season, the team won the matches against both Galatasaray and Fenerbahçe. Both matches were away games. 1461 Trabzon finished in third place in the TFF First League and gained rights to play in the play-off games for the promotion to the Süper Lig but were not allowed by the TFF because of being the local affiliate of Trabzonspor. In Turkish football league system reserve teams are not allowed to play in the same league as the main club.

== Honours ==
=== Domestic ===
==== League ====
- TFF Second League:
  - Winners (1): 2011–12 (Red Group)
