= 2015–16 Trabzonspor season =

Trabzonspor
2015–16 season
- President: İbrahim Hacıosmanoğlu; Muharrem Usta
- Manager: Shota Arveladze; Sadi Tekelioğlu; Hami Mandıralı
- Stadium: Hüseyin Avni Aker
- Süper Lig: 12th
- Turkish Cup: Round of 16
- UEFA Europa League: Third qualifying round
- Top goalscorer: League: Óscar Cardozo (8); All: Óscar Cardozo (8)
- Highest home attendance: 20,384 vs Galatasaray
- Lowest home attendance: 4,461 vs Gaziantepspor (excluding matches behind closed doors)
- Average home league attendance: 10,704 (excluding matches behind closed doors)
Home colours	Away colours	Third colours

The 2015–16 Trabzonspor season was the club's 41st consecutive season in the Süper Lig.

== Squad ==
Note: Flags indicate national team as defined under FIFA eligibility rules; some limited exceptions apply. Players may hold more than one non-FIFA nationality.

No.	Pos.	Nation	Player
1	GK	TUR	Onur Kıvrak (Captain)
2	DF	BRA	Douglas
3	DF	POR	José Bosingwa
4	DF	TUR	Aykut Demir
5	MF	TUR	Okay Yokuşlu
7	FW	PAR	Óscar Cardozo
8	MF	TUR	Mehmet Ekici
9	MF	TUR	Sefa Yılmaz
10	MF	TUR	Özer Hurmacı
17	FW	TUR	Muhammet Beşir
19	MF	GER	Marko Marin (on loan from Chelsea)
22	DF	TUR	Mustafa Yumlu
23	GK	CRC	Esteban Alvarado
24	DF	TUR	Salih Dursun (on loan from Galatasaray)
26	GK	TUR	Yavuz Aygün

No.	Pos.	Nation	Player
27	DF	TUR	Semih Karadeniz
29	MF	TUR	Savaş Çakır
32	MF	TUR	Yusuf Erdoğan
33	DF	TOG	Serge Akakpo (on loan from 1461 Trabzon)
35	MF	TUR	Aytaç Kara
38	MF	TUR	Ramazan Övüç
39	DF	BEL	Luis Pedro Cavanda
57	MF	TUR	Melih Kabasakal
66	MF	TUR	Fatih Atik
77	DF	TUR	Musa Nizam
88	DF	TUR	Güray Vural
92	FW	TUR	Muhammet Demir
97	MF	TUR	Yusuf Yazıcı
99	MF	TUR	Abdülkadir Ömür

=== Out on loan ===
Note: Flags indicate national team as defined under FIFA eligibility rules; some limited exceptions apply. Players may hold more than one non-FIFA nationality.

No.	Pos.	Nation	Player
—	FW	SEN	Dame N'Doye (at Sunderland until 30 June 2016)
—	FW	MLI	Mustapha Yatabaré (at Montpellier until 30 June 2016)
—	GK	TUR	Uğurcan Çakır (at 1461 Trabzon until 30 June 2016)
—	MF	TUR	Ferhat Yazgan (at 1461 Trabzon until 30 June 2016)
—	DF	TUR	Zeki Yavru (at Kayserispor until 30 June 2016)
—	DF	TUR	İshak Doğan (at Eskişehirspor until 30 June 2016)
—	DF	TUR	Oğulcan Gökçe (at 1461 Trabzon until 30 June 2016)
—	GK	TUR	Kurtuluş Yurt (at 1461 Trabzon until 30 June 2016)

No.	Pos.	Nation	Player
—	DF	TUR	Uğur Demirok (at Osmanlıspor until 30 June 2016)
—	GK	TUR	İbrahim Demir (at 1461 Trabzon until 30 June 2016)
—	MF	TUR	Batuhan Artarslan (at 1461 Trabzon until 30 June 2016)
—	DF	TUR	Mehmet Kuruoğlu (at 1461 Trabzon until 30 June 2016)
—	DF	TUR	Mustafa Akbaş (at Kayserispor until 30 June 2016)
—	DF	TUR	Göksu Alhas (at Ankaragücü until 30 June 2016)
—	MF	TUR	Gökhan Alsan (at Karabükspor until 30 June 2016)
—	MF	TUR	Mertcan Çam (at Şanlıurfaspor until 30 June 2016)

== Transfers ==
=== Summer ===
In: Note: Flags indicate national team as defined under FIFA eligibility rules; some limited exceptions apply. Players may hold more than one non-FIFA nationality.

No.	Pos.	Nation	Player
—	FW	SEN	Dame N'Doye (from (England) Hull City)
—	MF	TUR	Okay Yokuşlu (from (Turkey) Kayserispor)
—	DF	BEL	Luis Pedro Cavanda (from (Italy) Lazio)
—	MF	TUR	Özer Hurmacı (from (Turkey) Kasımpaşa)
—	DF	NED	Douglas (from (Russia) Dynamo Moscow)
—	DF	TUR	Alper Uludağ (from (Turkey) Kayserispor)
—	GK	CRC	Esteban Alvarado (from (Netherlands) AZ Alkmaar)
—	MF	CMR	Stéphane Mbia (from (Spain) Sevilla)
—	MF	GER	Marko Marin (loan from (England) Chelsea)

Out: Note: Flags indicate national team as defined under FIFA eligibility rules; some limited exceptions apply. Players may hold more than one non-FIFA nationality.

No.	Pos.	Nation	Player
—	FW	GHA	Abdul Majeed Waris (to (France) Lorient)
—	FW	TUR	Gökhan Karadeniz (to (Turkey) Göztepe)
—	MF	TUR	Abdulkadir Özdemir (to (Turkey) Akhisar Belediyespor)
—	DF	TUR	Caner Osmanpasa (to (Turkey) Akhisar Belediyespor)
—	GK	TUR	Fatih Öztürk (to (Turkey) Akhisar Belediyespor)
—	DF	TUR	Kadir Keleş (to (Turkey) Akhisar Belediyespor)
—	DF	ALG	Carl Medjani (contract terminated)
—	MF	ROU	Alexandru Bourceanu (contract terminated)
—	DF	GUI	Kévin Constant (contract terminated)
—	DF	POR	José Bosingwa (contract terminated)

=== Winter ===
In: Note: Flags indicate national team as defined under FIFA eligibility rules; some limited exceptions apply. Players may hold more than one non-FIFA nationality.

No.	Pos.	Nation	Player
—	FW	TUR	Muhammet Demir (from (Turkey) Gaziantepspor)
—	DF	TUR	Güray Vural (from (Turkey) Akhisar Belediyespor)
—	DF	TOG	Serge Akakpo (loan from (Turkey) 1461 Trabzon)
—	DF	POR	José Bosingwa (free agent)

Out: Note: Flags indicate national team as defined under FIFA eligibility rules; some limited exceptions apply. Players may hold more than one non-FIFA nationality.

No.	Pos.	Nation	Player
—	MF	CMR	Stéphane Mbia (to Hebei China Fortune)
—	MF	TUR	Soner Aydoğdu (to (Turkey) Akhisar Belediyespor)
—	DF	TUR	Alper Uludağ (to (Turkey) Akhisar Belediyespor)
—	FW	TUR	Serdar Gürler (to (Turkey) Gençlerbirliği)
—	FW	TUR	Deniz Yılmaz (to (Turkey) Bursaspor)

== Competitions ==
=== Süper Lig ===
==== Results ====
15 August 2015 1	Trabzonspor	1 – 0	Bursaspor	Trabzon
21:00 EEST (UTC+3)	Yokuşlu (yellow card) 32'; Demir (yellow card) 47'; Yumlu (yellow card) 50'; Zengin 66' (yellow card) 67'		Behich (yellow card) 66'; Jorquera (yellow card) 85'; Sivok (yellow card) 89'; Örnek (yellow card) 90+3'	Stadium: Hüseyin Avni Aker Stadium; Attendance: 18,300; Referee: Tolga Özkalfa

22 August 2015 2	Beşiktaş	1 – 2	Trabzonspor	Istanbul
21:45 EEST (UTC+3)	Motta (yellow card) 23'; Beck (yellow card) 52'; Quaresma 56' (yellow card) 45+2' (yellow-red card) 60'; Gülüm (yellow card) 90+3'		Mbia (yellow card) 22'; Zengin (yellow card) 47' (goal) 85'; Erdoğan 53'; Dursun (yellow card) 89'	Stadium: Atatürk Olympic Stadium; Attendance: 28,422; Referee: Ali Palabıyık

30 August 2015 3	Trabzonspor	2 – 2	Akhisar Belediyespor	Trabzon
19:00 EEST (UTC+3)	Erdoğan 42' (yellow card) 87'; Mbia (yellow card) 73'; Cardozo 85'		Kabze 56'; Douglão (yellow card) 61'; Rodallega 77'; Cebe (yellow card) 81'; Lukač (yellow card) 90+1'	Stadium: Hüseyin Avni Aker Stadium; Attendance: 7,890; Referee: Alper Ulusoy

14 September 2015 4	Kayserispor	0 – 1	Trabzonspor	Kayseri
21:00 EEST (UTC+3)	Özçal (yellow card) 53'; Simić (yellow card) 58'		Uludağ (yellow card) 28'; Douglas (yellow card) 69'; N'Doye (yellow card) 83'; Cardozo 86'; Kıvrak (yellow card) 90+4'	Stadium: Kadir Has Stadium; Attendance: 4,910; Referee: Hüseyin Göçek

19 September 2015 5	Trabzonspor	0 – 1	Galatasaray	Trabzon
20:00 EEST (UTC+3)	Constant (yellow card) 18'; Mbia (yellow card) 33'		Kaya (yellow card) 37'; Mbia 82' (o.g.)	Stadium: Hüseyin Avni Aker Stadium; Attendance: 20,384; Referee: Cüneyt Çakır

26 September 2015 6	Osmanlıspor	3 – 1	Trabzonspor	Ankara
16:00 EEST (UTC+3)	Aslantaş (yellow card) 8'; Torje 42'; Çağıran (red card) 45'; Kılıçaslan 66'; Deliktaş 70'		Mbia (yellow card) 45'; Yumlu (yellow card) 52'; Marin 85'; Erdoğan (yellow card) 86'; Zengin (yellow card) 90+1'	Stadium: Osmanlı Stadyumu; Attendance: 4,484; Referee: Deniz Ateş Bitnel

2 October 2015 7	Trabzonspor	1 – 2	Konyaspor	Trabzon
20:00 EEST (UTC+3)	Dursun (yellow card) 0'; Yokuşlu (yellow card) 37'; Yumlu (yellow card) 48'; Medjani 59'; Douglas (yellow card) 72'; Zengin (yellow card) 77' (yellow-red card) 90+3'		Turan (yellow card) 43'; Meha 51' (pen.) (yellow card) 89'; Traoré 70'; Çamdalı (yellow card) 82'	Stadium: Hüseyin Avni Aker Stadium; Attendance: 6,695; Referee: Süleyman Abay

19 October 2015 8	Mersin İdmanyurdu	3 – 2	Trabzonspor	Mersin
20:00 EEST (UTC+3)	Balcı (yellow card) 24'; Nakoulma 26', 40' (yellow card) 81'; Pedriel (yellow card) 51' (yellow-red card) 62'; Wederson 61' (yellow card) 74'; Kaya (yellow card) 81'		Douglas (yellow card) 39'; Yılmaz (yellow card) 59'; Cardozo 75'; Mbia 90+5'	Stadium: Mersin Arena; Attendance: 7,399; Referee: Bülent Yıldırım

24 October 2015 9	Sivasspor	0 – 2	Trabzonspor	Sivas
19:00 EEST (UTC+3)	Boye (yellow card) 47' (yellow-red card) 56'; Erdal (yellow card) 54'; Chahechouhe (yellow card) 90+2'		Yokuşlu 13', 50' (yellow card) 31'; Esteban (yellow card) 38'; Cavanda (yellow card) 54' (yellow-red card) 54'; Yılmaz (yellow card) 58'; Erdoğan (yellow card) 64'	Stadium: Sivas 4 Eylül Stadium; Attendance: 4,584; Referee: Ali Palabıyık

28 October 2015 10	Trabzonspor	2 – 2	Gaziantepspor	Trabzon
21:45 EEST (UTC+3)	Demir 61' (yellow card) 90+1'; Hurmacı (yellow card) 66'; Cardozo 74' (yellow card) 80'; Medjani (yellow card) 88'; Dursun (yellow card) 90+4'		Demir (yellow card) 16'; Çınar 32'; Putsila (yellow card) 45+2'; Larsson 52'; Şen (yellow card) 59'; Marçal (yellow card) 75'	Stadium: Hüseyin Avni Aker Stadium; Attendance: 4,461; Referee: Çağatay Şahan

7 November 2015 11	Başakşehir	1 – 0	Trabzonspor	Istanbul
16:00 EEST (UTC+3)	Ayhan 3'; Badji (yellow card) 21'; Batdal (yellow card) 69'; Şahin (yellow card) 90+3'		Douglas (yellow card) 7'; Cavanda (yellow card) 33'	Stadium: Başakşehir Fatih Terim Stadium; Attendance: 6,428; Referee: Fırat Aydınus

22 November 2015 12	Trabzonspor	1 – 0	Gençlerbirliği	Trabzon
16:30 EET (UTC+2)	Cavanda (yellow card) 64'; Ekici 90+2'			Stadium: Hüseyin Avni Aker Stadium; Attendance: 0 (match behind closed doors); Referee: Halis Özkahya

30 November 2015 13	Fenerbahçe	2 – 0	Trabzonspor	Istanbul
20:00 EET (UTC+2)	Nani 11' (yellow card) 38'; Kaldırım (yellow card) 24'; Alves (yellow card) 63'; Marković (yellow card) 83'; Fernandão 88'		Demir (yellow card) 14'; Uludağ (yellow card) 40' (yellow-red card) 42'; Dursun (yellow card) 83'	Stadium: Şükrü Saracoğlu Stadium; Attendance: 37,500; Referee: Deniz Ateş Bitnel

7 December 2015 14	Trabzonspor	3 – 1	Eskişehirspor	Trabzon
20:00 EET (UTC+2)	Cardozo 17'; Yokuşlu (yellow card) 21'; Demir (yellow card) 45'; Ekici 56' (pen.); Cavanda (yellow card) 89'; Beşir (yellow card) 90+1' (goal) 90+3'		Karaer (yellow card) 25'; Toko (yellow card) 45'; Güngör (yellow card) 56' (yellow-red card) 75'; Güral (yellow card) 61'; Boffin (yellow card) 68'; Pinto 85'	Stadium: Hüseyin Avni Aker Stadium; Attendance: 0 (match behind closed doors); Referee: Yaşar Kemal Uğurlu

12 December 2015 15	Çaykur Rizespor	3 – 0	Trabzonspor	Rize
19:00 EET (UTC+2)	Altınay (yellow card) 10'; Kweuke 41'; Duruer 45'; Özek (yellow card) 45'; Kadah 72'		Ekici (yellow card) 16'; Dursun (yellow card) 63'; Hurmacı (yellow card) 75'	Stadium: Yeni Rize Şehir Stadı; Attendance: 3,676; Referee: Ali Palabıyık

19 December 2015 16	Trabzonspor	3 – 0	Antalyaspor	Trabzon
19:00 EET (UTC+2)	Cardozo 15'; Mbia (yellow card) 68' (goal) 90+3'; Demir (yellow card) 80'; Ekici 83' (pen.)		Guilherme (yellow card) 21'; Čelůstka (yellow card) 21' (yellow-red card) 73'; Etame (yellow card) 83'; Arat (yellow card) 88'; Makoun (yellow card) 89'	Stadium: Hüseyin Avni Aker Stadium; Attendance: 6,351; Referee: Bülent Yıldırım

26 December 2015 17	Kasımpaşa	1 – 1	Trabzonspor	Istanbul
19:00 EET (UTC+2)	Durak (yellow card) 7'; Derdiyok 17'; Torun (yellow card) 21'; Veigneau (yellow card) 24'; Sarı (yellow card) 49'		Yumlu (yellow card) 16' (goal) 20'; Erdoğan (yellow card) 88'; Yokuşlu (yellow card) 90+3'	Stadium: Recep Tayyip Erdoğan Stadium; Attendance: 3,429; Referee: Özgür Yankaya

17 January 2016 18	Bursaspor	4 – 2	Trabzonspor	Bursa
16:00 EET (UTC+2)	Faty (yellow card) 17'; Yıldırım 23'; Necid 40' (pen.); Aziz (yellow card) 68' (goal) 82'; Sivok 71'		Nizam 2'; Cardozo 7'; Mbia (yellow card) 27'; Demir (yellow card) 52'; Cavanda (yellow card) 67'; Aydoğdu (yellow card) 80'	Stadium: Timsah Arena; Attendance: 24,034; Referee: Serkan Çınar

15 March 2016 (Note: Postponed, originally on 24 January 2016.) 19	Trabzonspor	0 – 2	Beşiktaş	Trabzon
19:30 EET (UTC+2)	Douglas (yellow card) 71'		Gómez 76'; Şahan 86'	Stadium: Hüseyin Avni Aker Stadium; Attendance: 14,615; Referee: Bülent Yıldırım

7 February 2016 20	Akhisar Belediyespor	2 – 1	Trabzonspor	Manisa
15:00 EET (UTC+2)	Douglão 8'; Yüce (yellow card) 45'; Keleş (yellow card) 50'; Rodallega 80' (pen.)		Demir 14'; Marin (yellow card) 45'; Dursun (yellow card) 62'; Douglas (red card) 87'	Stadium: Manisa 19 Mayıs Stadium; Attendance: 2,854; Referee: Halis Özkahya

15 February 2016 21	Trabzonspor	2 – 1	Kayserispor	Trabzon
20:00 EET (UTC+2)	Yılmaz (yellow card) 14' (goal) 40'; Bosingwa (yellow card) 21'; Marin 35' (yellow card) 83'; Kara (yellow card) 76'; Demir (yellow card) 77'		Bayram (yellow card) 64'; Yavru 78'	Stadium: Hüseyin Avni Aker Stadium; Attendance: 4,738; Referee: İlker Meral

21 February 2016 22	Galatasaray	2 – 1	Trabzonspor	Istanbul
19:00 EET (UTC+2)	Podolski 63' (yellow card) 69'; Sneijder (yellow card) 79'; İnan 89' (pen.)		Zengin 25'; Hurmacı (yellow card) 49' (yellow-red card) 59'; Demir (yellow card) 60' (yellow-red card) 69'; Cavanda (red card) 86'; Dursun (red card) 86'	Stadium: Türk Telekom Arena; Attendance: 22,208; Referee: Deniz Ateş Bitnel

27 February 2016 23	Trabzonspor	1 – 2	Osmanlıspor	Trabzon
19:00 EET (UTC+2)	Zengin (yellow card) 0'; Yılmaz 47'; Yumlu (yellow card) 90+4'		Rusescu 40', 51'; Gabriel Torje (yellow card) 67'	Stadium: Hüseyin Avni Aker Stadium; Attendance: 15,962; Referee: Özgür Yankaya

6 March 2016 24	Konyaspor	2 – 0	Trabzonspor	Konya
19:00 EET (UTC+2)	Traoré 28'; Çamdalı (yellow card) 48'; Şahiner 90+3'		Demir (yellow card) 26'; Övüç (yellow card) 55' (yellow-red card) 83'; Douglas (yellow card) 87'	Stadium: Torku Arena; Attendance: 23,300; Referee: Fırat Aydınus

11 March 2016 25	Trabzonspor	1 – 0	Mersin İdmanyurdu	Trabzon
20:00 EET (UTC+2)	Bosingwa (yellow card) 19'; Cardozo 48'; Yumlu (yellow card) 63'; Yokuşlu (yellow card) 69'		Wederson (yellow card) 60'; Welliton (yellow card) 63'; Sadiku (yellow card) 73'; Pedriel (yellow card) 85'	Stadium: Hüseyin Avni Aker Stadium; Attendance: 8,896; Referee: Halis Özkahya

19 March 2016 26	Trabzonspor	1 – 0	Sivasspor	Trabzon
16:00 EET (UTC+2)	Marin (yellow card) 45'; Kara 61'; Övüç (yellow card) 64'; Akakpo (yellow card) 79'; Yumlu (yellow card) 90+2'; Cardozo (yellow card) 90+2'		Oumari (yellow card) 84'; İncedemir (yellow card) 90+2'; Öztürk (yellow card) 90+2'	Stadium: Hüseyin Avni Aker Stadium; Attendance: 6,178; Referee: Halil Umumt Meler

2 April 2016 27	Gaziantepspor	0 – 1	Trabzonspor	Gaziantep
16:00 EEST (UTC+3)	Süme (yellow card) 76'		Demir (yellow card) 30'; Kara (yellow card) 40'; Yumlu 60'; Bosingwa (yellow card) 87'	Stadium: Gaziantep Kamil Ocak Stadium; Attendance: 2,717; Referee: Ümit Öztürk

10 April 2016 28	Trabzonspor	1 – 1	Başakşehir	Trabzon
19:00 EEST (UTC+3)	Aytaç (yellow card) 17' (yellow-red card) 86'; Erkan (yellow card) 32'; Akakpo 36'		Ayhan 8'; Belözoğlu (yellow card) 4+52'; Tekdemir (yellow card) 48'; Napoleoni (yellow card) 89'	Stadium: Hüseyin Avni Aker Stadium; Attendance: 6,560; Referee: Hüseyin Göçek

18 April 2016 29	Gençlerbirliği	3 – 1	Trabzonspor	Ankara
20:00 EEST (UTC+3)	Politevich 2'; Stancu 27'; Kahveci 59' (pen.); Landel (yellow card) 61'; Djalma (yellow card) 72'		Ekici (yellow card) 24'; Yumlu (yellow card) 45+3'; Demir (yellow card) 58'; Erdoğan (yellow card) 61'; Yokuşlu (yellow card) 62'; Demir 65'	Stadium: Ankara 19 Mayıs Stadium; Attendance: 2,489; Referee: Mete Kalkavan

24 April 2016 30	Trabzonspor	0 – 4	Fenerbahçe	Trabzon
20:00 EEST (UTC+3)	Dursun (yellow card) 43'; Cardozo (yellow card) 45'		Potuk 23' (yellow card) 41'; Şen 27' van Persie (yellow card) 29' (goal) 62'; Nani 57'	Stadium: Hüseyin Avni Aker Stadium; Attendance: 18,120; Referee: Bülent Yıldırım

30 April 2016 31	Eskişehirspor	1 – 0	Trabzonspor	Eskişehir
16:00 EEST (UTC+3)	Bekdemir 45+3' (pen.); Karakaş (yellow card) 45+4'; Hadžić (yellow card) 53'		Karadeniz (yellow card) 8'; Ekici (yellow card) 37'; Demir (yellow card) 45+3' (yellow-red card) 45+4'; Demir (yellow card) 90+3'	Stadium: Eskişehir Atatürk Stadium; Attendance: 9,560; Referee: Halis Özkahya

8 May 2016 32	Trabzonspor	6 – 0	Çaykur Rizespor	Trabzon
15:30 EEST (UTC+3)	Yazıcı 11', 57'; Ekici 15'; Demir 38', 41'; Erdoğan 69'; Beşir (yellow card) 79'		Makiadi (yellow card) 47'	Stadium: Hüseyin Avni Aker Stadium; Attendance: 0 (match behind closed doors); Referee: Alper Ulusoy

13 May 2016 33	Antalyaspor	7 – 0	Trabzonspor	Antalya
20:00 EEST (UTC+3)	Kurtuluş (yellow card) 14'; Şişmanoğlu 19', 50', 79' (yellow card) 50'; Charles 22'; Etame 51', 62'; Diego Ângelo (yellow card) 66'; Inkoom (yellow card) 83'; Danilo (yellow card) 90'		Ekici (yellow card) 24'; Yazıcı (yellow card) 30'; Erdoğan (yellow card) 34' (yellow-red card) 90'; Cardozo (yellow card) 54'; Karadeniz (yellow card) 90'	Stadium: New Antalya Stadium; Attendance: 10,033; Referee: Hakan Ceylan

19 May 2016 34	Trabzonspor	0 – 6	Kasımpaşa	Trabzon
20:00 EEST (UTC+3)	Yeşil (yellow card) 8'; Kara (yellow card) 66'		Derdiyok 13', 40' (yellow card) 57'; Del Valle 33'; Arslan (yellow card) 62'; Scarione 83'; Büyük 85'; Titi 89'	Stadium: Hüseyin Avni Aker Stadium; Attendance: 0 (match behind closed doors); Referee: Yaşar Kemal Uğurlu

==== League table ====
Pos	Team	Pld	W	D	L	GF	GA	GD	Pts
10	Gençlerbirliği	34	13	6	15	42	42	0	45
11	Bursaspor	34	13	5	16	47	55	−8	44
12	Trabzonspor	34	12	4	18	40	59	−19	40
13	Çaykur Rizespor	34	9	10	15	39	48	−9	37
14	Gaziantepspor	34	9	9	16	31	50	−19	36

Source: Süper Lig, Soccerway
Rules for classification: 1) Points; 2) Head-to-head points; 3) Head-to-head goal difference; 4) Head-to-head goals scored; 5) Goal difference; 6) Goals scored; 7) Play-off.

=== Turkish Cup ===
==== Group stage ====
Pos	Team	Pld	W	D	L	GF	GA	GD	Pts
1	Trabzonspor	6	5	0	1	12	4	+8	15
2	Gaziantepspor	6	3	2	1	8	5	+3	11
3	Adanaspor	6	2	1	3	8	13	−5	7
4	Nazilli Belediyespor	6	0	1	5	2	8	−6	1

15 December 2015 1	Nazilli Belediyespor	0 – 2	Trabzonspor	Aydın
14:00 EET (UTC+2)	Özeren (yellow card) 89'		N'Doye 65'; Erdoğan (yellow card) 74'; Hurmacı 82'	Stadium: Nazilli İlçe Stadyumu; Attendance: 4,300; Referee: Emre Malok

22 December 2015 2	Trabzonspor	2 – 1	Gaziantepspor	Trabzon
20:45 EET (UTC+2)	Kara (yellow card) 17'; Özdamar 49' (o.g.); Beşir 79'		Odabaşı 10'; Camara (yellow card) 44'; Abuda (yellow card) 90+3'	Stadium: Hüseyin Avni Aker Stadium; Attendance: 0 (match behind closed doors); Referee: İlker Meral

9 January 2016 3	Trabzonspor	3 – 0	Adanaspor	Trabzon
20:45 EET (UTC+2)	Yokuşlu (yellow card) 12'; Kara 34'; Demir 63'; Beşir 82'		Didi (yellow card) 12'; Foguinho (yellow card) 55'	Stadium: Hüseyin Avni Aker Stadium; Referee: Koray Gençerler

12 January 2016 4	Adanaspor	1 – 4	Trabzonspor	Adana
19:00 EET (UTC+2)	Uruç (yellow card) 51'; Dereli 82'		Erdoğan 13', 45'; Aydoğdu 23'; Yılmaz 64'	Stadium: Adana 5 Ocak Stadium; Referee: Özgüç Türkalp

20 January 2016 5	Trabzonspor	1 – 0	Nazilli Belediyespor	Trabzon
18:00 EET (UTC+2)	Demir (yellow card) 32'; Erdoğan 52'; Yokuşlu (yellow card) 66'		Yener (yellow card) 67'	Stadium: Hüseyin Avni Aker Stadium; Attendance: 1,300; Referee: Erkan Engin

27 January 2016 6	Gaziantepspor	2 – 0	Trabzonspor	Gaziantep
19:00 EET (UTC+2)	Çinemre 42'; Uyanık 69'		Yokuşlu (yellow card) 78'	Stadium: Gaziantep Kamil Ocak Stadium; Attendance: 1,500; Referee: Arda Kardeşler

==== Round of 16 ====
1 February 2016	Trabzonspor	0 – 1	Akhisar Belediyespor	Trabzon
20:45 EET (UTC+2)	Cardozo (yellow card) 8'; Hurmacı (yellow card) 8'; Kıvrak (yellow card) 79'; Yılmaz (yellow card) 90+1'		Douglão 21'; Ayık (yellow card) 23'; Çelik (yellow card) 35'; Sami (yellow card) 42'	Stadium: Hüseyin Avni Aker Stadium; Referee: Yaşar Kemal Uğurlu

=== UEFA Europa League ===
==== Qualifying rounds ====
16 July 2015 Second qualifying round 1st leg	Trabzonspor (Turkey)	1 – 0	(Luxembourg) Diffredange	Trabzon, Turkey
21:00 EEST (UTC+3)	Nizam (yellow card) 28'; Ekici 44'; Yılmaz (yellow card) 65'		Bukvić (yellow card) 35'	Stadium: Hüseyin Avni Aker Stadium; Attendance: 9,254; Referee: Ivailo Stoyanov (Bulgaria)

23 July 2015 Second qualifying round 2nd leg	Diffredange (Luxembourg)	1 – 2 (1 – 3 agg.)	(Turkey) Trabzonspor	Luxembourg City, Luxembourg
19:00 CEST (UTC+2)	Er Rafik 81'		Dursun 19' (yellow card) 88'; Aydoğdu 90+3'	Stadium: Stade Josy Barthel; Attendance: 3,455; Referee: Marco Borg (Malta)

30 July 2015 Third qualifying round 1st leg	Rabotnički (North Macedonia)	1 – 0	(Turkey) Trabzonspor	Skopje, Republic of Macedonia
20:00 CEST (UTC+2)	Ilijoski (yellow card) 9' (goal) 23'; Vujčić (yellow card) 51'	Report	Medjani (yellow card) 5'; Uludağ (yellow card) 55'; Yokuşlu (yellow card) 89'; Hurmacı (yellow card) 90'	Stadium: Philip II Arena; Attendance: 6,200; Referee: Paweł Gil (Poland)

6 August 2015 Third qualifying round 2nd leg	Trabzonspor (Turkey)	1 – 1 (a.e.t.) (1 – 2 agg.)	(North Macedonia) Rabotnički	Trabzon, Turkey
20:00EEST (UTC+3)	Yokuşlu 56'; Constant (yellow card) 64'; Yılmaz (yellow card) 77'; Mbia (yellow card) 80'; Cardozo (yellow card) 111'		Trajchevski (yellow card) 44' (yellow-red card) 65'; Marjan Altiparmakovski (yellow card) 64'; Ilijoski (yellow card) 65'; Petrovikj (yellow card) 86'; Markoski 112'	Stadium: Hüseyin Avni Aker Stadium; Attendance: 13,000; Referee: Steven McLean (Scotland)

== Squad statistics ==
=== Appearances and goals ===
No.	Pos	Nat	Player	Total		Süper Lig		Turkish Cup		UEFA Europa League	
No.	Pos	Nat	Player	Apps	Goals	Apps	Goals	Apps	Goals	Apps	Goals
1	GK	(Turkey) TUR	Onur Kıvrak	26	0	20	0	3	0	3	0
2	DF	(Netherlands) NED	Douglas	19	0	15+1	0	3	0	0	0
3	DF	(Portugal) POR	José Bosingwa	12	0	12	0	0	0	0	0
4	DF	(Turkey) TUR	Aykut Demir	26	2	19+1	1	5	1	1	0
5	MF	(Turkey) TUR	Okay Yokuşlu	36	3	24+3	2	7	0	1+1	1
6	DF	(Algeria) ALG	Carl Medjani	12	1	4+4	1	0	0	4	0
7	FW	(Paraguay) PAR	Óscar Cardozo	24	8	14+7	8	1	0	2	0
8	MF	(Turkey) TUR	Mehmet Ekici	22	5	16+2	4	1+1	0	2	1
9	MF	(Turkey) TUR	Sefa Yılmaz	18	2	7+5	2	1+1	0	3+1	0
10	MF	(Turkey) TUR	Özer Hurmacı	30	1	19+4	0	4+1	1	1+1	0
11	DF	(Guinea) GUI	Kévin Constant	11	0	8	0	0	0	3	0
13	GK	(Turkey) TUR	İbrahim Demir	0	0	0	0	0	0	0	0
14	FW	(Senegal) SEN	Dame N'Doye	14	1	7+5	0	2	1	0	0
15	DF	(Turkey) TUR	Uğur Demirok	2	0	0	0	0	0	2	0
16	MF	(Turkey) TUR	Cafer Tosun	1	0	0	0	0+1	0	0	0
17	FW	(Turkey) TUR	Muhammet Beşir	13	3	1+6	1	1+5	2	0	0
18	FW	(Turkey) TUR	Deniz Yılmaz	8	1	2+2	0	3	1	0+1	0
19	MF	(Germany) GER	Marko Marin	29	2	18+6	2	4+1	0	0	0
20	MF	(Turkey) TUR	Soner Aydoğdu	6	2	0+1	0	2+1	1	1+1	1
21	MF	(Sweden) SWE	Erkan Zengin	33	3	22+3	3	4	0	2+2	0
22	DF	(Turkey) TUR	Mustafa Yumlu	32	2	24+1	2	3	0	4	0
23	GK	(Costa Rica) CRC	Esteban Alvarado	16	0	14	0	2	0	0	0
24	DF	(Turkey) TUR	Salih Dursun	19	1	6+5	0	5	0	3	1
25	MF	(Cameroon) CMR	Stéphane Mbia	18	2	17	2	0	0	1	0
26	GK	(Turkey) TUR	Yavuz Aygün	1	0	0+1	0	0	0	0	0
27	DF	(Turkey) TUR	Semih Karadeniz	6	0	4+1	0	0+1	0	0	0
28	FW	(Ghana) GHA	Abdul Majeed Waris	3	0	3	0	0	0	0	0
29	FW	(Turkey) TUR	Savaş Çakır	3	0	2+1	0	0	0	0	0
32	MF	(Turkey) TUR	Yusuf Erdoğan	40	6	18+11	3	7	3	3+1	0
33	DF	(Togo) TOG	Serge Akakpo	10	1	7+3	1	0	0	0	0
35	MF	(Turkey) TUR	Aytaç Kara	26	2	13+5	1	6	1	0+2	0
38	MF	(Turkey) TUR	Ramazan Övüç	4	0	2+1	0	0+1	0	0	0
39	DF	(Belgium) BEL	Luis Pedro Cavanda	27	0	24+1	0	1	0	1	0
52	DF	(Turkey) TUR	Mert Yıldırım	0	0	0	0	0	0	0	0
57	MF	(Turkey) TUR	Melih Kabasakal	8	0	1+6	0	0+1	0	0	0
60	DF	(Turkey) TUR	Mehmet Kuruoğlu	2	0	0	0	2	0	0	0
61	DF	(Turkey) TUR	Zeki Yavru	1	0	0	0	0	0	0+1	0
64	DF	(Turkey) TUR	Alper Uludağ	9	0	5+1	0	2	0	1	0
66	MF	(Turkey) TUR	Fatih Atik	5	0	2+1	0	0+1	0	0+1	0
68	DF	(Turkey) TUR	İshak Doğan	0	0	0	0	0	0	0	0
77	DF	(Turkey) TUR	Musa Nizam	14	1	7+1	1	3+1	0	2	0
80	MF	(Turkey) TUR	Yağızcan Erdem	1	0	0+1	0	0	0	0	0
81	MF	(Turkey) TUR	Denizhan Deniz	0	0	0	0	0	0	0	0
88	DF	(Turkey) TUR	Güray Vural	7	0	5+1	0	1	0	0	0
92	FW	(Turkey) TUR	Muhammet Demir	14	4	11+2	4	0+1	0	0	0
95	MF	(Turkey) TUR	Mertcan Çam	1	0	0	0	0+1	0	0	0
96	GK	(Turkey) TUR	Uğurcan Çakır	3	0	0	0	2	0	1	0
97	MF	(Turkey) TUR	Yusuf Yazıcı	9	2	3+3	2	2+1	0	0	0
98	DF	(Turkey) TUR	Mehmet Yeşil	1	0	1	0	0	0	0	0
99	MF	(Turkey) TUR	Abdülkadir Ömür	2	0	0	0	0+2	0	0	0

=== Goal scorers ===
Place	Position	Nation	Number	Name	Süper Lig	Turkish Cup	UEFA Europa League	Total
1	FW	(Paraguay)	7	Óscar Cardozo	8	0	0	8
2	MF	(Turkey)	32	Yusuf Erdoğan	3	3	0	6
3	MF	(Turkey)	8	Mehmet Ekici	4	0	1	5
4	FW	(Turkey)	92	Muhammet Demir	4	0	0	4
5	MF	(Turkey)	5	Okay Yokuşlu	2	0	1	3
5	MF	(Sweden)	21	Erkan Zengin	3	0	0	3
5	FW	(Turkey)	17	Muhammet Beşir	1	2	0	3
8	DF	(Turkey)	22	Mustafa Yumlu	2	0	0	2
8	MF	(Turkey)	35	Aytaç Kara	1	1	0	2
8	DF	(Turkey)	4	Aykut Demir	1	1	0	2
8	MF	(Germany)	19	Marko Marin	2	0	0	2
8	MF	(Turkey)	9	Sefa Yılmaz	2	0	0	2
8	MF	(Cameroon)	25	Stéphane Mbia	2	0	0	2
8	MF	(Turkey)	97	Yusuf Yazıcı	2	0	0	2
8	MF	(Turkey)	20	Soner Aydoğdu	0	1	1	2
16	MF	(Turkey)	10	Özer Hurmacı	0	1	0	1
16	DF	(Turkey)	24	Salih Dursun	0	0	1	1
16	DF	(Turkey)	77	Musa Nizam	1	0	0	1
16	FW	(Senegal)	14	Dame N'Doye	0	1	0	1
16	DF	(Algeria)	6	Carl Medjani	1	0	0	1
16	DF	(Togo)	33	Serge Akakpo	1	0	0	1
16	FW	(Turkey)	18	Deniz Yılmaz	0	1	0	1
16				Own goal	0	1	0	1
				TOTALS	40	12	4	56

=== Disciplinary record ===
Number	Nation	Position	Name	Süper Lig		Turkish Cup		UEFA Europa League		Total	
Number	Nation	Position	Name	Yellow card	Red card	Yellow card	Red card	Yellow card	Red card	Yellow card	Red card
1	(Turkey)	GK	Onur Kıvrak	1	0	0	0	0	0	1	0
2	(Netherlands)	DF	Douglas	6	1	0	0	0	0	6	1
3	(Portugal)	DF	José Bosingwa	3	0	0	0	0	0	3	0
4	(Turkey)	DF	Aykut Demir	9	2	1	0	0	0	10	2
5	(Turkey)	MF	Okay Yokuşlu	7	0	3	0	1	0	11	0
6	(Algeria)	DF	Carl Medjani	1	0	0	0	1	0	2	0
7	(Paraguay)	FW	Óscar Cardozo	4	0	1	0	1	0	6	0
8	(Turkey)	MF	Mehmet Ekici	4	0	0	0	0	0	4	0
9	(Turkey)	MF	Sefa Yılmaz	2	0	1	0	1	0	4	0
10	(Turkey)	MF	Özer Hurmacı	2	1	1	0	1	0	4	1
11	(Guinea)	DF	Kévin Constant	1	0	0	0	1	0	2	0
13	(Turkey)	GK	İbrahim Demir	0	0	0	0	0	0	0	0
14	(Senegal)	FW	Dame N'Doye	1	0	0	0	0	0	0	0
15	(Turkey)	DF	Uğur Demirok	0	0	0	0	0	0	0	0
16	(Turkey)	MF	Cafer Tosun	0	0	0	0	0	0	0	0
17	(Turkey)	FW	Muhammet Beşir	2	0	0	0	0	0	2	0
18	(Turkey)	FW	Deniz Yılmaz	0	0	0	0	1	0	1	0
19	(Germany)	MF	Marko Marin	3	0	0	0	0	0	3	0
20	(Turkey)	MF	Soner Aydoğdu	1	0	0	0	0	0	1	0
21	(Sweden)	MF	Erkan Zengin	5	1	0	0	0	0	5	1
22	(Turkey)	DF	Mustafa Yumlu	8	0	0	0	0	0	8	0
23	(Costa Rica)	GK	Esteban Alvarado	1	0	0	0	0	0	1	0
24	(Turkey)	DF	Salih Dursun	8	1	0	0	1	0	9	1
25	(Cameroon)	MF	Stéphane Mbia	6	0	0	0	1	0	7	0
26	(Turkey)	GK	Yavuz Aygün	0	0	0	0	0	0	0	0
27	(Turkey)	DF	Semih Karadeniz	2	0	0	0	0	0	2	0
28	(Ghana)	FW	Abdul Majeed Waris	0	0	0	0	0	0	0	0
29	(Turkey)	FW	Savaş Çakır	0	0	0	0	0	0	0	0
32	(Turkey)	MF	Yusuf Erdoğan	5	1	1	0	0	0	6	1
33	(Togo)	DF	Serge Akakpo	1	0	0	0	0	0	1	0
35	(Turkey)	MF	Aytaç Kara	3	1	1	0	0	0	4	1
38	(Turkey)	MF	Ramazan Övüç	1	1	0	0	0	0	1	1
39	(Belgium)	DF	Luis Pedro Cavanda	4	1	0	0	0	0	4	1
52	(Turkey)	DF	Mert Yıldırım	0	0	0	0	0	0	0	0
57	(Turkey)	MF	Melih Kabasakal	0	0	0	0	0	0	0	0
60	(Turkey)	DF	Mehmet Kuruoğlu	0	0	0	0	0	0	0	0
61	(Turkey)	DF	Zeki Yavru	0	0	0	0	0	0	0	0
64	(Turkey)	DF	Alper Uludağ	1	1	0	0	1	0	2	1
66	(Turkey)	MF	Fatih Atik	0	0	0	0	0	0	0	0
68	(Turkey)	DF	İshak Doğan	0	0	0	0	0	0	0	0
77	(Turkey)	DF	Musa Nizam	0	0	0	0	1	0	1	0
80	(Turkey)	MF	Yağızcan Erdem	0	0	0	0	0	0	0	0
81	(Turkey)	MF	Denizhan Deniz	0	0	0	0	0	0	0	0
88	(Turkey)	DF	Güray Vural	0	0	0	0	0	0	0	0
92	(Turkey)	FW	Muhammet Demir	2	0	0	0	0	0	2	0
95	(Turkey)	MF	Mertcan Çam	0	0	0	0	0	0	0	0
96	(Turkey)	GK	Uğurcan Çakır	0	0	0	0	0	0	0	0
97	(Turkey)	MF	Yusuf Yazıcı	1	0	0	0	0	0	1	0
98	(Turkey)	DF	Mehmet Yeşil	1	0	0	0	0	0	1	0
99	(Turkey)	MF	Abdülkadir Ömür	0	0	0	0	0	0	0	0
			TOTALS	96	11	9	0	11	0	116	11
