= List of Turkish football transfers summer 2014 =

This is a list of Turkish football transfers in the summer transfer window 2013 by club. Only transfers of the Süper Lig is included.

== Süper Lig ==
=== Fenerbahçe ===
Note: Flags indicate national team as has been defined under FIFA eligibility rules. Players may hold more than one non-FIFA nationality.

In:

No.	Pos.	Nation	Player
10	MF	BRA	Diego (from Atlético Madrid)

Out:

No.	Pos.	Nation	Player
6	DF	NGA	Joseph Yobo (to Free Agent)
8	DF	SWE	Samuel Holmén (on loan to Bursaspor)
16	MF	BRA	Cristian Baroni (to Free Agent)
48	MF	TUR	Salih Uçan (on loan to A.S. Roma)
—	MF	SVK	Miroslav Stoch (on loan to Al Ain)

=== Galatasaray ===
In:

No.	Pos.	Nation	Player
18	MF	TUR	Sinan Gümüş (from VfB Stuttgart)
23	MF	TUR	Yasin Öztekin (from Kayseri Erciyesspor)
29	MF	TUR	Olcan Adın (from Trabzonspor)
38	GK	TUR	Sinan Bolat (on loan from Porto)
—	MF	TUR	Endoğan Adili (from Basel)
—	MF	TUR	Kaan Baysal (from PSV Eindhoven)
—	DF	TUR	Tarık Çamdal (from Eskişehirspor)
—	MF	SUI	Blerim Džemaili (from Napoli)
—	FW	MKD	Goran Pandev (from Napoli)

Out:

No.	Pos.	Nation	Player
2	DF	ARG	Guillermo Burdisso (loan return to Boca Juniors)
6	MF	TUR	Ceyhun Gülselam (to Hannover 96)
9	FW	SWE	Johan Elmander (to Brøndby)
11	FW	CIV	Didier Drogba (to Chelsea)
14	MF	BIH	Izet Hajrović (to Werder Bremen)
53	MF	MAR	Nordin Amrabat (on loan to Málaga)
82	GK	TUR	Aykut Erçetin (to Çaykur Rizespor)
86	GK	TUR	Ufuk Ceylan (to İstanbul Başakşehir)
94	MF	ARG	Lucas Ontivero (on loan to Gaziantepspor)
—	MF	TUR	Serdar Eylik (to Samsunspor)

=== Beşiktaş ===
In:

No.	Pos.	Nation	Player
9	FW	SEN	Demba Ba (from Chelsea)
31	DF	BRA	Ramon de Morais Motta (from Corinthians, previously on loan)
17	FW	TUR	Cenk Tosun (from Gaziantepspor)
—	MF	ARG	José Sosa (from Metalist Kharhiv)

Out:

No.	Pos.	Nation	Player
—	MF	TUR	Erkan Kaş (to Karabükspor)
—	DF	TUR	Tanju Kayhan (to Karabükspor)
—	MF	POR	Manuel Fernandes (to Lokomotiv Moscow)
—	MF	TUR	Burak Kaplan (to Wattenscheid 09)

=== Trabzonspor ===
In:

No.	Pos.	Nation	Player
25	DF	GRE	Avraam Papadopoulos (from Olympiacos)
7	FW	PAR	Oscar Cardozo (from Benfica)
21	MF	GUI	Kévin Constant (from Milan)
—	MF	ALG	Essaïd Belkalem (on loan from Watford)
—	DF	ALG	Carl Medjani (from Monaco)
—	FW	TUR	Serdar Gürler (from Elazığspor)
—	DF	TUR	Musa Nizam (from Antalyaspor)
—	DF	TUR	İshak Doğan (from Karabükspor)
—	MF	TUR	Sefa Yılmaz (from Kayserispor)
—	MF	TUR	Fatih Atık (from Guingamp)
—	FW	TUR	Turgut Doğan Şahin (from Gaziantepspor)
—	MF	TUR	Anıl Taşdemir (from Orduspor)
—	FW	TUR	Deniz Yılmaz (from Deniz Yılmaz)
—	FW	GHA	Abdul Majeed Waris (from Spartak Moscow)
—	FW	MLI	Mustapha Yatabaré (from Guingamp)

Out:

No.	Pos.	Nation	Player
10	MF	POL	Adrian Mierzejewski (to Al Nassr)
12	FW	BRA	Paulo Henrique (to Shanghai Greenland)
17	FW	TUR	Batuhan Karadeniz (to Sivasspor)
83	FW	AUT	Marc Janko (to Sydney)
92	MF	TUR	Olcan Adın (to Galatasaray)
99	DF	TUR	Kadir Keleş (to Akhisar Belediyespor)
—	FW	TUR	Turgut Doğan Şahin (to Kayserispor)

=== Sivasspor ===
In:

No.	Pos.	Nation	Player

Out:

No.	Pos.	Nation	Player

=== Kasımpaşa ===
In:

No.	Pos.	Nation	Player
9	FW	SUI	Eren Derdiyok (from 1899 Hoffenheim)
88	MF	POR	André Castro (from Porto, previously on loan)

Out:

No.	Pos.	Nation	Player

=== Karabükspor ===
In:

No.	Pos.	Nation	Player

Out:

No.	Pos.	Nation	Player

=== Bursaspor ===
In:

No.	Pos.	Nation	Player
8	MF	MLI	Bakaye Traoré (from Milan)
91	MF	TUR	Aydın Karabulut (from Sivasspor)

Out:

No.	Pos.	Nation	Player

=== Gençlerbirliği ===
In:

No.	Pos.	Nation	Player
—	MF	ROU	Liviu Antal (from Vaslui)

Out:

No.	Pos.	Nation	Player
6	DF	CRO	Ante Kulušić (to Balıkesirspor)
13	MF	TUR	Oktay Delibalta (to Mersin İ.Y.)

=== Akhisar Belediyespor ===
In:

No.	Pos.	Nation	Player

Out:

No.	Pos.	Nation	Player

=== Torku Konyaspor ===
In:

No.	Pos.	Nation	Player
—	MF	ROU	Gabriel Torje (on loan from Udinese)
—	FW	ROU	Ciprian Marica (from Getafe)
30	FW	ANG	Djalma Campos (on loan from Porto)
—	DF	AUT	Benjamin Fuchs (from Manisaspor)
—	MF	TUR	Uğur İnceman (from Antalyaspor)
—	MF	TUR	Barış Örücü (from Denizlispor)
—	DF	TUR	Özgür Özkaya (from Elazığspor)
—	FW	BUL	Dimitar Rangelov (from Luzern)
—	GK	TUR	Oğuzhan Demirci (from Lommel United)

Out:

No.	Pos.	Nation	Player

=== Eskişehirspor ===
In:

No.	Pos.	Nation	Player

Out:

No.	Pos.	Nation	Player

=== Çaykur Rizespor ===
In:

No.	Pos.	Nation	Player

Out:

No.	Pos.	Nation	Player

=== Kayseri Erciyesspor ===
In:

No.	Pos.	Nation	Player
—	FW	TUR	İlhan Parlak (from Karabükspor)
—	DF	TUR	Anıl Karaer (from Karabükspor)
—	FW	TUR	Necati Ateş (from Eskişehirspor)
—	GK	TUR	Zülküf Özer (from Elazığspor)
—	DF	GHA	John Boye (from Rennes)
—	MF	MLI	Yacouba Sylla (on loan from Aston Villa)
—	DF	TUR	Mahmut Özen (on loan from Malmö)
—	MF	TUR	Cenk Ahmet Alkılıç (from Çaykur Rizespor)
—	DF	SEN	Kader Mangane (from Al-Hilal)

Out:

No.	Pos.	Nation	Player

=== Gaziantepspor ===
In:

No.	Pos.	Nation	Player

Out:

No.	Pos.	Nation	Player

=== İstanbul Başakşehir ===
In:

No.	Pos.	Nation	Player

Out:

No.	Pos.	Nation	Player

=== Balıkesirspor ===
In:

No.	Pos.	Nation	Player

Out:

No.	Pos.	Nation	Player

df Loret Sadiku

df Loret Sadiku
