= List of Turkish football transfers summer 2017 =

This is a list of Turkish football transfers in the 2017 summer transfer window by club. Only clubs in the 2017–18 Süper Lig are included.

== Süper Lig ==
=== Akhisar Belediyespor ===
In:

No.	Pos.	Nation	Player
5	MF	TUR	Eray Ataseven (from (Turkey) Balıkesirspor)
9	FW	POR	Hélder Barbosa (from (United Arab Emirates) Al-Wasl)
12	FW	BRA	Paulo Henrique (from (China) Shanghai Shenhua)
13	DF	POR	Miguel Lopes (from (Portugal) Sporting CP, previously on loan)
—	DF	TUR	Alperen Babacan (from (Turkey) Denizlispor)
—	MF	MNE	Petar Grbić (from (Turkey) Adana Demirspor)

Out:

No.	Pos.	Nation	Player
8	MF	TUR	Abdulkadir Özdemir (to (Turkey) Erzurumspor)
9	FW	POR	Ricardo Vaz Tê (to (China) Henan Jianye)
14	DF	GER	Tolga Ünlü (to (Turkey) Erzurumspor)
27	MF	POR	Custódio Castro (retired)
30	FW	COD	Jeremy Bokila (on loan to (Romania) Cluj)
37	FW	ALB	Sokol Cikalleshi (loan return to (Turkey) İstanbul Başakşehir)
90	FW	SWE	Mervan Çelik (released)
—	DF	SLO	Miral Samardžić (to (Russia) Anzhi Makhachkala)

=== Alanyaspor ===
In:

No.	Pos.	Nation	Player
8	MF	GRE	Giannis Maniatis (from (Greece) Atromitos)
9	FW	CMR	Mbilla Etame (from (Turkey) Antalyaspor)
11	FW	GER	Yusuf Çoban (from (Germany) Hoffenheim II)
15	DF	MLI	Mamadou Fofana (loan return from (Turkey) Bandırmaspor)
21	DF	COD	Fabrice N'Sakala (from (Belgium) Anderlecht, previously on loan)
40	MF	ZAM	Chisamba Lungu (from (Russia) Ural Yekaterinburg)
69	GK	FRA	Rémy Riou (from (France) Nantes)
—	DF	TUR	Erhan Kartal (loan return from (Turkey) Gaziantep BB)

Out:

No.	Pos.	Nation	Player
6	MF	MAR	Ismaïl Aissati (released)
23	MF	POR	Daniel Candeias (loan return to (Portugal) Benfica)
44	DF	NGR	Kenneth Omeruo (loan return to (England) Chelsea)
74	GK	TUR	Alişan Şeker (released)
77	MF	HAI	Wilde-Donald Guerrier (to (Azerbaijan) Qarabağ)
78	FW	CHI	Junior Fernandes (loan return to (Croatia) Dinamo Zagreb)

=== Antalyaspor ===
In:

No.	Pos.	Nation	Player
4	DF	SUI	Johan Djourou (from (Germany) Hamburger SV)
10	FW	FRA	Jérémy Ménez (from (France) Bordeaux)
11	MF	BRA	Maicon (from (Russia) Lokomotiv Moscow)
13	MF	FRA	Samir Nasri (from (England) Manchester City)
70	DF	TUR	Musa Nizam (from (Turkey) Trabzonspor)

Out:

No.	Pos.	Nation	Player
2	DF	TUR	Can Arat (to (Turkey) Sarıyer)
6	DF	BIH	Kenan Horić (to (Cyprus) Pafos)
10	FW	SEN	Lamine Diarra (to (Turkey) Elazığspor)
99	FW	CMR	Mbilla Etame (to (Turkey) Alanyaspor)

=== Beşiktaş ===
In:

No.	Pos.	Nation	Player
5	DF	POR	Pepe (from (Spain) Real Madrid)
9	FW	ESP	Álvaro Negredo (from (Spain) Valencia)
12	MF	CHI	Gary Medel (from (Italy) Inter Milan)
17	FW	TUR	Gökhan Töre (loan return from (England) West Ham United)
33	DF	TUR	Atınç Nukan (on loan from (Germany) RB Leipzig)
71	GK	UKR	Denys Boyko (loan return from (Spain) Málaga)
88	DF	TUR	Caner Erkin (from (Italy) Inter Milan, previously on loan)
—	MF	TUR	Orkan Çınar (from (Turkey) Gaziantepspor)

Out:

No.	Pos.	Nation	Player
30	DF	BRA	Marcelo (to (France) Lyon)
32	DF	GER	Andreas Beck (to (Germany) VfB Stuttgart)
44	DF	BRA	Rhodolfo (to (Brazil) Flamengo)
80	MF	SUI	Gökhan Inler (to (Turkey) İstanbul Başakşehir)
—	GK	TUR	Hüseyin Yılmaz (to (Turkey) Ümraniyespor)
—	DF	TUR	Ersan Gülüm (loan return to Hebei China Fortune)
—	MF	TUR	Eslem Öztürk (to (Turkey) İstanbulspor)
—	FW	CMR	Vincent Aboubakar (loan return to (Portugal) Porto)
—	FW	TUR	Ömer Şişmanoğlu (to (Turkey) Göztepe)

=== Bursaspor ===
In:

No.	Pos.	Nation	Player
6	DF	BRA	Titi (from (Turkey) Kasımpaşa)
15	FW	CZE	Tomáš Necid (loan return from (Poland) Legia Warsaw)
19	DF	SEN	Vieux Sané (loan return from (France) Auxerre)
26	DF	TUR	Barış Yardımcı (from (Turkey) Gaziantepspor)
46	MF	NGR	Mikel Agu (on loan from (Portugal) Porto)
77	MF	GHA	Emmanuel Agyemang-Badu (on loan from (Italy) Udinese)
93	DF	NGR	William Troost-Ekong (from (Belgium) Gent)
—	DF	URU	Erick Cabaco (on loan from (Uruguay) Nacional)
—	MF	TUR	İbrahim Serdar Aydın (loan return from (Turkey) Yeşil Bursa)
—	MF	TUR	Emirhan Aydoğan (loan return from (Turkey) Yeşil Bursa)
—	FW	CGO	Dzon Delarge (from (Austria) Admira Wacker)

Out:

No.	Pos.	Nation	Player
6	MF	TUR	Şamil Çinaz (to (Turkey) Kayserispor)
19	DF	SEN	Vieux Sané (on loan to (France) Auxerre)
22	DF	TUR	Erdem Özgenç (released)
28	FW	VEN	Yonathan Del Valle (loan return to (Portugal) Rio Ave)
—	DF	SLO	Boban Jović (on loan to (Poland) Śląsk Wrocław)
—	DF	CZE	Tomáš Sivok (to (Israel) Maccabi Petah Tikva)

=== Fenerbahçe ===
In:

No.	Pos.	Nation	Player
2	DF	CHI	Mauricio Isla (from (Italy) Cagliari)
11	MF	TUR	Mehmet Ekici (from (Turkey) Trabzonspor)
14	DF	POR	Luís Neto (on loan from (Russia) Zenit)
17	MF	MAR	Nabil Dirar (from (France) Monaco)
18	GK	CMR	Carlos Kameni (from (Spain) Málaga)
20	MF	BRA	Giuliano (from (Russia) Zenit)
21	MF	MKD	Eljif Elmas (from (North Macedonia) Rabotnički)
28	MF	FRA	Mathieu Valbuena (from (France) Lyon)
34	GK	TUR	Erten Ersu (loan return from (Turkey) Gaziantepspor)
99	FW	ESP	Roberto Soldado (from (Spain) Villarreal)

Out:

No.	Pos.	Nation	Player
4	DF	DEN	Simon Kjær (to (Spain) Sevilla)
11	MF	UKR	Oleksandr Karavayev (loan return to (Ukraine) Shakhtar Donetsk)
17	FW	SEN	Moussa Sow (loan return to (United Arab Emirates) Al-Ahli)
23	DF	NED	Gregory van der Wiel (to (Italy) Cagliari)
29	FW	NGR	Emmanuel Emenike (to (Greece) Olympiacos)
40	GK	BRA	Fabiano (loan return to (Portugal) Porto)
77	MF	NED	Jeremain Lens (loan return to (England) Sunderland)
99	MF	SVK	Miroslav Stoch (to (Czech Republic) SK Slavia Prague)
—	DF	TUR	Hakan Çinemre (to (Turkey) Göztepe)

=== Galatasaray ===
In:

No.	Pos.	Nation	Player
2	DF	BRA	Mariano (from (Spain) Sevilla)
3	DF	BRA	Maicon (from (Brazil) São Paulo)
10	MF	MAR	Younès Belhanda (from (Ukraine) Dynamo Kyiv)
15	MF	NED	Ryan Donk (loan return from (Spain) Real Betis)
16	GK	FRA	Cédric Carrasso (from (France) Bordeaux)
17	MF	TUR	Emrah Başsan (loan return from (Netherlands) Fortuna Sittard)
18	FW	FRA	Bafétimbi Gomis (from (Wales) Swansea City)
20	MF	SEN	Badou (from (Turkey) Osmanlıspor)
21	DF	TUR	Tarık Çamdal (loan return from (Turkey) Eskişehirspor)
25	MF	BRA	Fernando (from (England) Manchester City)
64	DF	BEL	Jason Denayer (on loan from (England) Manchester City)
89	MF	ALG	Sofiane Feghouli (from (England) West Ham United)

Out:

No.	Pos.	Nation	Player
10	MF	NED	Wesley Sneijder (to (France) Nice)
11	FW	GER	Lukas Podolski (to (Japan) Vissel Kobe)
20	MF	POR	Bruma (to (Germany) RB Leipzig)
21	DF	CMR	Aurélien Chedjou (to (Turkey) İstanbul Başakşehir)
26	DF	TUR	Semih Kaya (to (Czech Republic) Sparta Prague)
30	MF	POR	Josué (loan return to (Portugal) Porto)
39	DF	BEL	Luis Pedro Cavanda (on loan to (Belgium) Standard Liège)
55	DF	TUR	Sabri Sarıoğlu (released)
—	GK	TUR	Cenk Gönen (to (Spain) Málaga)
—	DF	FRA	Lionel Carole (on loan to (Spain) Sevilla)

=== Gençlerbirliği ===
In:

No.	Pos.	Nation	Player
10	MF	NED	Elvis Manu (from (England) Brighton & Hove Albion)
17	MF	TUR	Murat Duruer (from (Turkey) Kayserispor)
22	MF	MTN	Diallo Guidileye (from (France) Nancy)
32	FW	SRB	Petar Škuletić (from (Russia) Lokomotiv Moscow)
—	FW	BRA	Jaílton Paraíba (from (China) Dalian Transcendence)

Out:

No.	Pos.	Nation	Player
4	DF	NED	Ferhat Görgülü (to (Turkey) Karabükspor)
7	MF	TUR	Serdar Gürler (to (Turkey) Osmanlıspor)
—	MF	TUR	Selçuk Şahin (to (Turkey) Göztepe)
—	FW	SLO	Etien Velikonja (to (Netherlands) Willem II)

=== Göztepe ===
In:

No.	Pos.	Nation	Player
3	DF	CIV	Adama Traoré (from (Switzerland) Basel)
6	MF	SLO	Rajko Rotman (from (Turkey) İstanbul Başakşehir)
8	MF	POR	André Castro (from (Turkey) Kasımpaşa)
9	FW	ALG	Nabil Ghilas (from (Portugal) Porto)
10	MF	ARG	Óscar Scarione (from (Israel) Maccabi Tel Aviv)
11	MF	FRA	Axel Ngando (from (France) Bastia)
13	GK	POR	Beto (from (Portugal) Sporting CP)
17	DF	FRA	Mathieu Peybernes (on loan from (France) Lorient)
21	MF	TUR	Selçuk Şahin (from (Turkey) Gençlerbirliği)
41	DF	TUR	Hakan Çinemre (from (Turkey) Fenerbahçe)
94	MF	FRA	Yoan Gouffran (from (England) Newcastle United)
—	MF	TUR	Gökhan Karadeniz (loan return from (Turkey) Bandırmaspor)
—	MF	TUR	İsmail Köse (loan return from (Turkey) Gümüşhanespor)
—	FW	TUR	Ömer Şişmanoğlu (from (Turkey) Beşiktaş)

Out:

No.	Pos.	Nation	Player
52	MF	TUR	Canberk Dilaver (on loan to (Turkey) Giresunspor)
—	MF	GEO	Aleksandre Kobakhidze (to (Ukraine) Vorskla Poltava)
—	FW	MLI	Famoussa Koné (on loan to (Azerbaijan) Gabala)

=== İstanbul Başakşehir ===
In:

No.	Pos.	Nation	Player
19	FW	TUR	Mevlüt Erdinç (from (Germany) Hannover 96)
22	DF	CMR	Aurélien Chedjou (from (Turkey) Galatasaray)
23	FW	TUR	Tunay Torun (from (Turkey) Kasımpaşa)
25	MF	SEN	Cheikhou Dieng (loan return from (Austria) St. Pölten)
27	DF	MAR	Manuel da Costa (from (Greece) Olympiacos)
29	MF	TUR	Kerim Frei (from (England) Birmingham City)
44	DF	TUR	Egemen Korkmaz (from (Switzerland) Wil)
69	DF	FRA	Gaël Clichy (from (England) Manchester City)
87	MF	NED	Eljero Elia (from (Netherlands) Feyenoord)
88	MF	SUI	Gökhan Inler (from (Turkey) Beşiktaş)
99	FW	ALB	Sokol Cikalleshi (loan return from (Turkey) Akhisar Belediyespor)
—	MF	SLO	Rajko Rotman (loan return from (Turkey) Kayserispor)

Out:

No.	Pos.	Nation	Player
17	FW	TUR	Cengiz Ünder (to (Italy) Roma)
—	DF	TUR	Yalçın Ayhan (to (Turkey) Yeni Malatyaspor)
—	DF	NGR	Musa Muhammed (on loan to (Bulgaria) Lokomotiv Plovdiv)
—	MF	SLO	Rajko Rotman (to (Turkey) Göztepe)
—	MF	TUR	Cenk Şahin (to (Germany) St. Pauli, previously on loan)

=== Karabükspor ===
In:

No.	Pos.	Nation	Player
8	MF	ROU	Gabriel Torje (on loan from (Russia) Akhmat Grozny)
12	MF	MLI	Hamidou Traoré (from (Turkey) Elazığspor)
20	MF	MNE	Vladimir Rodić (loan return from (Serbia) Rad)
42	DF	TUR	Hakan Aslantaş (loan return from (Turkey) Kayserispor)
—	DF	NED	Ferhat Görgülü (from (Turkey) Gençlerbirliği)
—	MF	ROU	Gheorghe Grozav (from (Russia) Terek Grozny)
—	MF	ROU	Ionuț Neagu (loan return from (Cyprus) Nea Salamis)
—	FW	ROU	Marius Alexe (loan return from (Slovakia) Železiarne Podbrezová)

Out:

No.	Pos.	Nation	Player
20	MF	MNE	Vladimir Rodić (to (Denmark) Randers)
21	MF	SLO	Dejan Lazarević (loan return to (Italy) ChievoVerona)
28	FW	BIH	Ermin Zec (released)
98	GK	TUR	Ercüment Kafkasyalı (to (Turkey) Sakaryaspor)

=== Kasımpaşa ===
In:

No.	Pos.	Nation	Player
7	MF	EGY	Trézéguet (on loan from (Belgium) Anderlecht)
13	DF	TUN	Syam Ben Youssef (from (France) Caen)
15	FW	VEN	Jhon Murillo (on loan from (Portugal) Benfica)
43	MF	GHA	Bernard Mensah (on loan from (Spain) Atlético Madrid)
77	MF	GER	Markus Neumayr (from (Switzerland) Luzern)
—	FW	COL	Michael Rangel (on loan from (Colombia) Atlético Junior)

Out:

No.	Pos.	Nation	Player
2	DF	HUN	Kenny Otigba (loan return to (Netherlands) Heerenveen)
3	DF	BUL	Vasil Bozhikov (to (Slovakia) Slovan Bratislava)
4	DF	BRA	Titi (to (Turkey) Bursaspor)
7	MF	KOS	Herolind Shala (loan return to (Czech Republic) Sparta Prague)
8	MF	POR	André Castro (to (Turkey) Göztepe)
11	FW	TUR	Tunay Torun (to (Turkey) İstanbul Başakşehir)
33	FW	TUR	Batuhan Altıntaş (loan return to (Germany) Hamburger SV)

=== Kayserispor ===
In:

No.	Pos.	Nation	Player
2	DF	POR	Tiago Lopes (from (Romania) Cluj)
3	FW	GHA	Asamoah Gyan (from (China) Shanghai SIPG)
5	MF	CHI	Gonzalo Espinoza (from Universidad de Chile)
19	DF	TUR	Mert Ilıman (loan return from (Turkey) BB Erzurumspor)
22	DF	ROU	Cristian Săpunaru (from (Romania) Astra Giurgiu)
25	MF	SEN	Stéphane Badji (on loan from (Belgium) Anderlecht)
33	GK	ROU	Silviu Lung Jr. (from (Romania) Astra Giurgiu)
63	MF	BEL	Geoffrey Bia (from (Switzerland) Sion)
—	DF	UKR	Oleksandr Kucher (from (Ukraine) Shakhtar Donetsk)
—	DF	TUR	Atila Turan (from (France) Stade Reims)
—	MF	BRA	Fernando Boldrin (from (Romania) Steaua București)
—	MF	TUR	Şamil Çinaz (from (Turkey) Bursaspor)
—	MF	SRB	Dejan Meleg (from (Serbia) Vojvodina)
—	MF	TUR	Mert Özyıldırım (loan return from (Turkey) Etimesgut Belediyespor)
—	FW	TUR	Furkan Yaman (loan return from (Turkey) Nazilli Belediyespor)

Out:

No.	Pos.	Nation	Player
5	MF	SLO	Rajko Rotman (loan return to (Turkey) İstanbul Başakşehir)
6	DF	COD	Larrys Mabiala (to (United States) Portland Timbers)
12	MF	NGR	Raheem Lawal (loan return to (Turkey) Osmanlıspor)
13	MF	AZE	Umut Sönmez (to (Turkey) Adana Demirspor)
17	MF	TUR	Murat Duruer (to (Turkey) Gençlerbirliği)
20	FW	BFA	Alain Traoré (to (Qatar) Al-Markhiya)
23	MF	TUR	Erkan Kaş (loan return to (Turkey) Sivasspor)
42	DF	TUR	Hakan Aslantaş (loan return to (Turkey) Karabükspor)
—	DF	BRA	Douglão (to (Cyprus) Anorthosis Famagusta)
—	MF	MLI	Samba Sow (to (Russia) Dynamo Moscow)

=== Konyaspor ===
In:

No.	Pos.	Nation	Player
8	FW	GAB	Malick Evouna (on loan from (China) Tianjin TEDA)
19	MF	COD	Wilfred Moke (from (Romania) Steaua București)
35	GK	SWE	Patrik Carlgren (from (Denmark) Nordsjælland)
42	MF	CRO	Petar Filipović (from Austria Wien)
53	MF	SUI	Musa Araz (from (Switzerland) Lausanne)
68	MF	FRA	Mehdi Bourabia (from (Bulgaria) Levski Sofia)

Out:

No.	Pos.	Nation	Player
9	FW	BUL	Dimitar Rangelov (to (Turkey) Ümraniyespor)
10	FW	BIH	Riad Bajić (to (Italy) Udinese)
26	DF	SRB	Jagoš Vuković (to (Greece) Olympiacos)
27	MF	KOS	Alban Meha (released)
33	MF	CIV	Ibrahim Sissoko (to (Cyprus) Doxa Katokopias)
54	DF	TUR	Mehmet Uslu (to (Turkey) Rizespor)
—	DF	SCO	Barry Douglas (to (England) Wolverhampton Wanderers)

=== Osmanlıspor ===
In:

No.	Pos.	Nation	Player
7	MF	TUR	Serdar Gürler (from (Turkey) Gençlerbirliği)
8	MF	NGR	Raheem Lawal (loan return from (Turkey) Kayserispor)
—	DF	DEN	Andreas Maxsø (from (Denmark) Nordsjælland)
—	DF	SVK	Branislav Niňaj (on loan from (Belgium) Lokeren)
—	MF	TUR	Selman Sevinç (loan return from (Turkey) Bugsaşspor)
—	FW	MLI	Cheick Diabaté (loan return from (France) Metz)

Out:

No.	Pos.	Nation	Player
5	DF	TUR	Aykut Demir (loan return to (Turkey) Trabzonspor)
9	FW	CMR	Pierre Webó (released)
10	MF	SEN	Badou (to (Turkey) Galatasaray)
11	FW	GER	Erdal Kılıçaslan (released)
17	MF	MAR	Adrien Regattin (released)
28	MF	CGO	Dzon Delarge (loan return to (Austria) Admira Wacker)
93	MF	NED	Adam Maher (loan return to (Netherlands) PSV)
—	MF	JPN	Takayuki Seto (to (Romania) Astra Giurgiu, previously on loan)

=== Sivasspor ===
In:

No.	Pos.	Nation	Player
2	FW	CIV	Arouna Koné (from (England) Everton)
3	DF	NGR	Elderson Echiéjilé (from (France) Monaco)
4	DF	RUS	Vitali Dyakov (from (Russia) Dynamo Moscow)
6	DF	SWE	Mattias Bjärsmyr (from (Sweden) Göteborg)
90	FW	CIV	Cyriac (from (Belgium) Oostende)
93	GK	URU	Sergio Rochet (from (Netherlands) AZ)
—	DF	TUR	Emre Öztürk (loan return from (Turkey) Manisaspor)
—	MF	TUR	Erkan Kaş (loan return from (Turkey) Kayserispor)
—	MF	CGO	Delvin N'Dinga (from (Russia) Lokomotiv Moscow)
—	MF	UKR	Serhiy Rybalka (on loan from (Ukraine) Dynamo Kyiv)

Out:

No.	Pos.	Nation	Player
44	DF	SLO	Dejan Kelhar (loan return to (Slovenia) Olimpija Ljubljana)

=== Trabzonspor ===
In:

No.	Pos.	Nation	Player
2	DF	TUR	Kamil Çörekçi (from (Turkey) Eskişehirspor)
7	MF	BEL	Théo Bongonda (on loan from (Spain) Celta Vigo)
17	FW	TUR	Burak Yılmaz (from (China) Beijing Sinobo Guoan)
33	MF	SVK	Juraj Kucka (from (Italy) Milan)
—	DF	TUR	Aykut Demir (loan return from (Turkey) Osmanlıspor)

Out:

No.	Pos.	Nation	Player
—	DF	TUR	Musa Nizam (to (Turkey) Antalyaspor)
—	MF	TUR	Mehmet Ekici (to (Turkey) Fenerbahçe)
—	MF	TUR	Aytaç Kara (on loan to (Turkey) Yeni Malatyaspor)
—	FW	AZE	Ramil Sheydayev (on loan to (Azerbaijan) Qarabağ)

=== Yeni Malatyaspor ===
In:

No.	Pos.	Nation	Player
2	DF	TUR	Yalçın Ayhan (from (Turkey) İstanbul Başakşehir)
9	FW	MAR	Khalid Boutaïb (from (France) Strasbourg)
10	MF	NED	Nacer Barazite (from (Netherlands) Utrecht)
27	DF	MAR	Issam Chebake (from (France) Le Havre)
30	GK	BEN	Fabien Farnolle (from (France) Le Havre)
35	MF	TUR	Aytaç Kara (on loan from (Turkey) Trabzonspor)
87	MF	SEN	Issiar Dia (from (France) Nancy)
88	FW	ARG	Emanuel Dening (from (Argentina) San Martín (SJ))
—	MF	GUI	Sadio Diallo (from (France) Bastia)
—	FW	TUR	Batuhan Altıntaş (on loan from (Germany) Hamburger SV)

Out:

No.	Pos.	Nation	Player
