= 2021–22 Fatih Karagümrük S.K. season =

Fatih Karagümrük S.K.
2023–24 season
- Owner: Süleyman Hurma
- President: Süleyman Hurma
- Manager: Volkan Demirel
- Stadium: Atatürk Olympic Stadium
- Süper Lig: 8th
- Turkish Cup: Quarter-finals
- Top goalscorer: League: Aleksandar Pešić (14); All: Aleksandar Pešić (14)
- Highest home attendance: 3,892 vs Trabzonspor
- Lowest home attendance: 176 vs Konyaspor

The 2021–22 season was Fatih Karagümrük S.K.'s 96th season in existence and second consecutive in the Süper Lig, the top division of association football in Turkey. They also competed in the Turkish Cup.

== Players ==
=== First-team squad ===
As of 3 March 2022

No.	Pos.	Nation	Player
1	GK	TUR	Yavuz Aygün
2	GK	ITA	Emiliano Viviano
4	DF	ITA	Davide Biraschi (on loan from Genoa)
6	MF	ARG	Lucas Biglia (captain)
7	FW	NGR	Ahmed Musa
9	FW	TUR	Emre Mor (on loan from Celta Vigo)
10	MF	SWE	Jimmy Durmaz
11	MF	TUR	Kerim Frei
13	GK	TUR	Cem Kablan
14	MF	TUR	Efe Tatlı
16	FW	ITA	Fabio Borini
18	MF	GER	Levent Mercan (on loan from Schalke 04)
19	DF	TUR	Emir Yazici
21	GK	TUR	Utku Yuvakuran (on loan from Beşiktaş)
22	MF	TUR	Samed Onur
23	MF	CRO	Kristijan Bistrović (on loan from CSKA Moscow)

No.	Pos.	Nation	Player
24	MF	GEO	Vato Arveladze
25	DF	NED	Derrick Luckassen (on loan from PSV)
27	DF	TUR	Serhat Ahmetoğlu (on loan from Fenerbahçe)
29	DF	SLO	Jure Balkovec
30	DF	TUR	Salih Dursun
60	DF	TUR	Alparslan Erdem
72	FW	SRB	Aleksandar Pešić
77	MF	BEL	Adnan Ugur (on loan from Fortuna Sittard)
86	DF	TUR	Burak Bekaroğlu
87	DF	BIH	Ervin Zukanović
88	DF	TUR	Caner Erkin
90	FW	TUR	Berke Demircan
92	FW	FRA	Yann Karamoh (on loan from Parma)
93	FW	FRA	Yannis Salibur
94	MF	FRA	Abdoulaye Touré (on loan from Genoa)
99	DF	ITA	Rayyan Baniya

== Transfers ==
=== In ===
Pos.	Player	Transferred from	Fee	Date	Source
MF	(Turkey) Kerim Frei	(Netherlands) FC Emmen	Free	1 July 2021	
FW	(Serbia) Aleksandar Pešić	(Israel) Maccabi Tel Aviv	Free	1 July 2021	
MF	(Nigeria) Ahmed Musa	(Nigeria) Kano Pillars	Free	22 July 2021	
DF	(Morocco) Medhi Benatia	(Qatar) Al-Duhail	Free	3 August 2021	
MF	(Sweden) Jimmy Durmaz	(Turkey) Galatasaray	Free	6 August 2021	
DF	(Turkey) Caner Erkin	(Turkey) Fenerbahçe	Free	7 September 2021	

=== Out ===
Pos.	Player	Transferred to	Fee	Date	Source
MF	(Argentina) Lucas Castro	(Turkey) Adana Demirspor	Free	30 July 2021	
MF	(Senegal) Alassane Ndao	(Saudi Arabia) Al-Ahli	€3,000,000	31 July 2021	
MF	(Italy) Andrea Bertolacci	(Turkey) Kayserispor	€1,000,000	11 January 2022	
DF	(Norway) Vegar Eggen Hedenstad	(Norway) Kayserispor	€800,000	15 January 2022	

== Pre-season and friendlies ==
Win Draw Loss Fixtures

31 July 2021 Friendly	Alanyaspor (Turkey)	v	(Turkey) Fatih Karagümrük
19:00 TRT (UTC+3)

4 August 2021 Friendly	Kasımpaşa (Turkey)	5–1	(Turkey) Fatih Karagümrük
19:00 TRT (UTC+3)

4 September 2021 Friendly	İstanbul Başakşehir (Turkey)	3–1	(Turkey) Fatih Karagümrük
18:00 TRT (UTC+3)

10 October 2021 Friendly	Fatih Karagümrük (Turkey)	1–0	(Turkey) Bursaspor
12:00 TRT (UTC+3)	Onur 64'

13 November 2021 Friendly	Fatih Karagümrük (Turkey)	4–3	(Turkey) Kocaelispor
12:00 TRT (UTC+3)	Borini 5', 12'; Torun 15'; Salibur 85'		Diop 35'; Köse 40'; Pereira 77'

== Competitions ==
=== Overall record ===
Competition	First match	Last match	Starting round	Final position	Record							
Competition	First match	Last match	Starting round	Final position	Pld	W	D	L	GF	GA	GD	Win %
Süper Lig	14 August 2021	22 May 2022	Matchday 1	8th	38	16	9	13	47	52	−5	42.11
Turkish Cup	1 December 2021	2 March 2022	Fourth round	Quarter-finals	4	3	0	1	11	5	+6	75.00
Total					42	19	9	14	58	57	+1	45.24

Source: Soccerway

=== Süper Lig ===
==== League table ====
Pos	Team	Pld	W	D	L	GF	GA	GD	Pts	Qualification or relegation
6	Beşiktaş	38	15	14	9	56	48	+8	59 (Note: Beşiktaş finished ahead of Antalyaspor on head-to-head points: Antalyaspor 2–3 Beşiktaş, Beşiktaş 0–0 Antalyaspor.)	
7	Antalyaspor	38	16	11	11	54	47	+7	59	
8	Fatih Karagümrük	38	16	9	13	47	52	−5	57	
9	Adana Demirspor	38	15	10	13	60	47	+13	55	
10	Sivasspor	38	14	12	12	52	50	+2	54	Qualification for the Europa League play-off round (Note: Sivasspor qualified for the Europa League play-off round as the 2021–22 Turkish Cup winners.)

Source: Süper Lig
Rules for classification: 1) Points; 2) Head-to-head points; 3) Head-to-head goal difference; 4) Head-to-head goals scored; 5) Goal difference; 6) Goals scored; 7) Play-off.

==== Results summary ====
Overall								Home						Away					
Pld	W	D	L	GF	GA	GD	Pts	W	D	L	GF	GA	GD	W	D	L	GF	GA	GD
38	16	9	13	47	52	−5	57	10	5	4	29	18	+11	6	4	9	18	34	−16

Source: Trendyol Süper Lig

==== Results by round ====
Round	1	2	3	4	5	6	7	8	9	10	11	12	13	14	15	16	17	18	19
Ground	H	A	A	H	A	H	A	H	A	H	A	H	A	H	A	H	A	H	A
Result	W	D	L	W	W	D	L	W	W	D	L	D	W	L	L	L	W	D	D
Position																			

Source: Trendyol Süper Lig
A = Away; H = Home; W = Win; D = Draw; L = Loss

==== Matches ====
14 August 2021 1	Fatih Karagümrük	3–2	Gaziantep	Istanbul
19:15 TRT (UTC+3)				Stadium: Atatürk Olympic Stadium

21 August 2021 2	Çaykur Rizespor	0–0	Gaziantep	Rize
19:15 TRT (UTC+3)				Stadium: Rize City Stadium

28 August 2021 3	Beşiktaş	1–0	Fatih Karagümrük	Istanbul
21:45 TRT (UTC+3)				Stadium: Vodafone Park

11 September 2021 1	Fatih Karagümrük	4–0	Adana Demirspor	Istanbul
17:00 TRT (UTC+3)				Stadium: Atatürk Olympic Stadium

17 September 2021 5	Yeni Malatyaspor	3–4	Fatih Karagümrük	Malatya
20:00 TRT (UTC+3)				Stadium: New Malatya Stadium

21 September 2021 6	Fatih Karagümrük	0–0	Antalyaspor	Istanbul
17:00 TRT (UTC+3)				Stadium: Atatürk Olympic Stadium

25 September 2021 7	Sivasspor	4–0	Fatih Karagümrük	Sivas
13:30 TRT (UTC+3)				Stadium: New Sivas 4 Eylül Stadium

1 October 2021 8	Fatih Karagümrük	3–1	İstanbul Başakşehir	Istanbul
20:00 TRT (UTC+3)				Stadium: Atatürk Olympic Stadium

17 October 2021 9	Altay	0–1	Fatih Karagümrük	İzmir
16:00 TRT (UTC+3)				Stadium: Bornova Aziz Kocaoğlu Stadium

24 October 2021 10	Fatih Karagümrük	1–1	Hatayspor	Istanbul
13:30 TRT (UTC+3)				Stadium: Atatürk Olympic Stadium

31 October 2021 11	Kayserispor	2–1	Fatih Karagümrük	Kayseri
13:30 TRT (UTC+3)				Stadium: Kadir Has Stadium

7 November 2021 12	Fatih Karagümrük	1–1	Galatasaray	Istanbul
16:00 TRT (UTC+3)				Stadium: Atatürk Olympic Stadium; Attendance: 1,442; Referee: Atilla Karaoğlan

21 November 2021 13	Kasımpaşa	1–3	Fatih Karagümrük	Istanbul
13:30 TRT (UTC+3)				Stadium: Recep Tayyip Erdoğan Stadium

28 November 2021 14	Fatih Karagümrük	0–2	Trabzonspor	Istanbul
16:00 TRT (UTC+3)				Stadium: Atatürk Olympic Stadium; Attendance: 3,892; Referee: Cüneyt Çakır

5 December 2021 15	Giresunspor	3–1	Fatih Karagümrük	Giresun
16:00 TRT (UTC+3)				Stadium: Çotanak Sports Complex

11 December 2021 16	Fatih Karagümrük	1–4	Konyaspor	Istanbul
13:30 TRT (UTC+3)				Stadium: Atatürk Olympic Stadium; Attendance: 176; Referee: Yaşar Uğurlu

19 December 2021 17	Göztepe	0–1	Fatih Karagümrük	İzmir
16:00 TRT (UTC+3)				Stadium: Gürsel Aksel Stadium

22 December 2021 18	Fatih Karagümrük	1–1	Fenerbahçe	Istanbul
20:00 TRT (UTC+3)				Stadium: Atatürk Olympic Stadium; Referee: Erkan Özdamar

26 December 2021 19	Alanyaspor	1–1	Fatih Karagümrük	Alanya
16:00 TRT (UTC+3)				Stadium: Alanya Stadium

9 April 2022 32	Fatih Karagümrük	3–2	Kasımpaşa	Istanbul
TRT (UTC+3)				Stadium: Atatürk Olympic Stadium

15 April 2022 33	Trabzonspor	1–1	Fatih Karagümrük	Trabzon
TRT (UTC+3)				Stadium: Şenol Güneş Sports Complex

23 April 2022 34	Fatih Karagümrük	2–1	Giresunspor	Istanbul
TRT (UTC+3)				Stadium: Atatürk Olympic Stadium

30 April 2022 35	Konyaspor	1–2	Fatih Karagümrük	Konya
TRT (UTC+3)				Stadium: Konya Metropolitan Municipality Stadium

7 May 2022 36	Fatih Karagümrük	3–1	Göztepe	Istanbul
TRT (UTC+3)				Stadium: Atatürk Olympic Stadium

15 May 2022 37	Fenerbahçe	0–0	Fatih Karagümrük	Istanbul
TRT (UTC+3)				Stadium: Şükrü Saracoğlu Stadium

22 May 2022 38	Fatih Karagümrük	0–1	Alanyaspor	Istanbul
TRT (UTC+3)				Stadium: Atatürk Olympic Stadium

=== Turkish Cup ===
1 December 2021 Fourth round	Fatih Karagümrük	2–0	Sarıyer	Istanbul
15:00 TRT (UTC+3)				Stadium: Atatürk Olympic Stadium

29 December 2021 Fifth round	Fatih Karagümrük	4–0	Bodrumspor	Istanbul
15:00 TRT (UTC+3)				Stadium: Atatürk Olympic Stadium
