= Demircan =

Demircan is a Turkish surname.

- Abdülaziz Demircan, Turkish footballer
- Ahmet Demircan, Turkish physician and politician
- Berke Demircan, Turkish footballer
- Ela-May Demircan, British actress
- Emirhan Demircan (born 2005), Turkish footballer
- Fethi Demircan, Turkish football manager
- Sevim Demircan (born 2000), Turkish para-athlete

== See also ==
- Demirkan (different etymology)
