= Iliman =

Iliman is both a given name and a surname. Notable people with the name include:

Given name:

- Iliman Ndiaye (born 2000), French footballer

Surname:

- Mert Ilıman (born 1995), Turkish footballer
