= Demirkan =

Demirkan is a Turkish surname. Notable people with the surname include:

- Demir Demirkan (born 1972), Turkish musician and composer
- Renan Demirkan (born 1955), Turkish-German writer and actress

== See also ==
- Demircan (different etymology)
