= Cafer Tosun =

Turkish footballer

Personal information
- Date of birth: 20 November 1999 (age 26)
- Place of birth: Düzköy, Turkey
- Height: 1.85 m (6 ft 1 in)
- Position: Midfielder

Team information
- Current team: Trabzon Faroz Yalıspor

Youth career
- 2011–2015: Trabzonspor

Senior career*
Years	Team	Apps	(Gls)
2015–2021	Trabzonspor	2	(0)
2016–2017	→ 1461 Trabzon (loan)	16	(0)
2018–2019	→ 1461 Trabzon (loan)	14	(1)
2020	→ Sarıyer (loan)	2	(1)
2021	İnegölspor	3	(0)
2021–2023	İstanbulspor	0	(0)
2022–2023	→ Elazığspor (loan)	11	(1)
2024	Darıca Gençlerbirliği	10	(0)
2025–	Trabzon Faroz Yalıspor		

International career
2012	Turkey U14	2	(0)
2014	Turkey U15	8	(1)
2015	Turkey U16	10	(1)
2015–2016	Turkey U17	7	(0)
- * Club domestic league appearances and goals as of 27 April 2024

Cafer Tosun (born 20 November 1999) is a Turkish professional footballer who plays as a midfielder for the amateur side Trabzon Faroz Yalıspor.

== Career ==
Tosun made his professional debut for Trabzonspor in a 3-0 Süper Lig win over MKE Ankaragücü on 23 November 2019.

== Honours ==
Trabzonspor

- Turkish Cup: 2019–20
