= Salih Dursun =

Turkish footballer

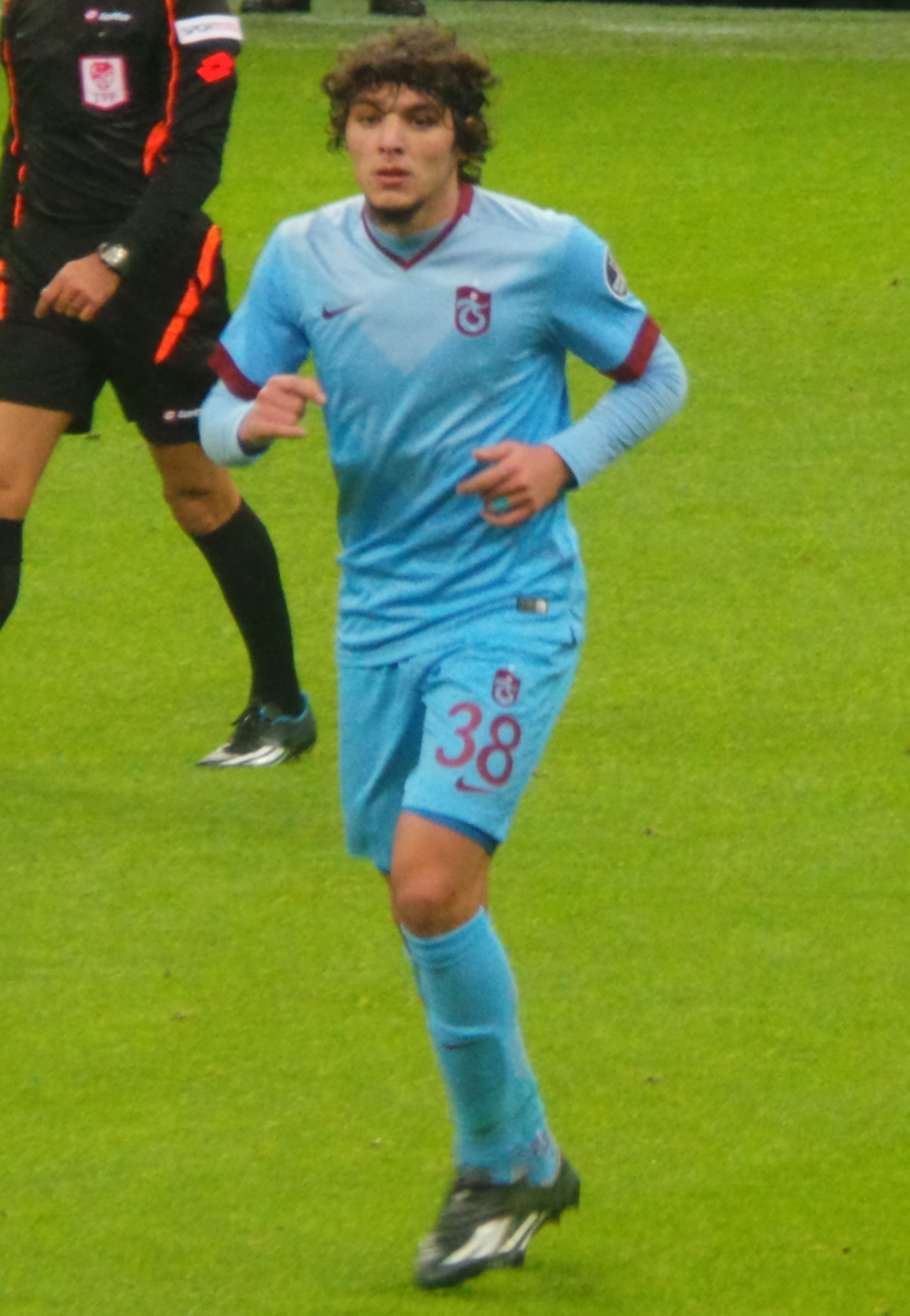
- Dursun for Trabzonspor in 2014

Personal information
- Date of birth: 12 July 1991 (age 35)
- Place of birth: Adapazarı, Turkey
- Height: 1.88 m (6 ft 2 in)
- Positions: Right back; defensive midfielder

Senior career*
Years	Team	Apps	(Gls)
2009–2012	Sakaryaspor	78	(11)
2012–2014	Kayserispor	40	(4)
2014–2017	Galatasaray	2	(0)
2014–2016	→ Trabzonspor (loan)	33	(1)
2017	→ Antalyaspor (loan)	16	(0)
2017–2020	Antalyaspor	22	(0)
2020–2021	Gençlerbirliği	14	(2)
2021–2024	Fatih Karagümrük	57	(4)
2024–2025	Sakaryaspor	13	(1)
2025	Fatih Karagümrük	6	(0)
2025–2026	Sakaryaspor	21	(2)

International career^{‡}
2012–	Turkey A2	7	(0)
- * Club domestic league appearances and goals as of 7 May 2026 ‡ National team caps and goals as of 24 February 2013

Salih Dursun (born 12 July 1991) is a Turkish footballer who plays as a right back and defensive midfielder.

== Club career ==
Dursun made his Süper Lig debut on 27 August 2012. Though he wasn't a particularly well-known player until 21 February 2016, he gained fame on that date after he showed the red card to referee Deniz Ateş Bitnel in an effort to protest the dismissal of his teammate Luis Pedro Cavanda in a match against Galatasaray. He himself was sent off following the act. While his extreme reaction received mixed feedback from the media and football fans alike, it was highly appreciated in the city of Trabzon, to the extent of having a street renamed after him.

== Career statistics ==
As of 26 October 2014.

Club	Season	League		Cup		Other		Continental		Total	
Club	Season	Apps	Goals	Apps	Goals	Apps	Goals	Apps	Goals	Apps	Goals
Sakaryaspor	2009–10	27	2	1	0	–		–		28	2
Sakaryaspor	2010–11	21	0	1	0	–		–		21	0
Sakaryaspor	2011–12	30	9	1	0	–		–		31	9
Sakaryaspor	Total	78	11	3	0	–		–		81	11
Kayserispor	2012–13	25	3	1	0	–		–		26	2
Kayserispor	2013–14	15	1	2	0	–		–		17	1
Kayserispor	Total	40	4	3	0	–		–		43	4
Galatasaray	2013–14	2	0	4	0	–		–		6	0
Galatasaray	Total	2	0	4	0	–		–		6	0
Trabzonspor (loan)	2014–15	21	1	6	0	–		8	0	35	1
Trabzonspor (loan)	Total	21	1	6	0	–		8	0	35	1
Career totals		141	16	16	0	–		8	0	165	16

== Honours ==
Galatasaray

- Türkiye Kupası: 2013–14
