= Canberk Dilaver =

Turkish footballer (born 1993)

Personal information
- Date of birth: 1 June 1993 (age 33)
- Place of birth: Samsun, Turkey
- Height: 1.79 m (5 ft 10 in)
- Position: Midfielder

Team information
- Current team: Diyarbekirspor
- Number: 52

Senior career*
| Years | Team | Apps | (Gls) |
| 2012–2013 | Samsunspor | 0 | (0) |
| 2013–2014 | Orduspor | 9 | (0) |
| 2014–2015 | Manisaspor | 11 | (0) |
| 2015 | 1461 Trabzon | 2 | (0) |
| 2015–2016 | Adanaspor | 30 | (1) |
| 2017–2018 | Göztepe | 15 | (0) |
| 2017–2018 | → Giresunspor (loan) | 4 | (0) |
| 2018 | → Elazığspor (loan) | 8 | (0) |
| 2018–2019 | Samsunspor | 18 | (0) |
| 2020–2021 | Adanaspor | 34 | (0) |
| 2021–2022 | Uşakspor | 13 | (0) |
| 2022–2023 | 24 Erzincanspor | 39 | (1) |
| 2023– | Diyarbekirspor | 3 | (0) |

International career
| 2013 | Turkey U20 | 2 | (0) |
- * Club domestic league appearances and goals as of 23 September 2023

Canberk Dilaver (born 1 June 1993) is a Turkish footballer who plays for Diyarbekirspor.

Canberk Dilaver has twice played for the Turkey U20s.
