= Carl Medjani =

Algerian footballer (born 1985)

Carl Medjani كارل مجاني
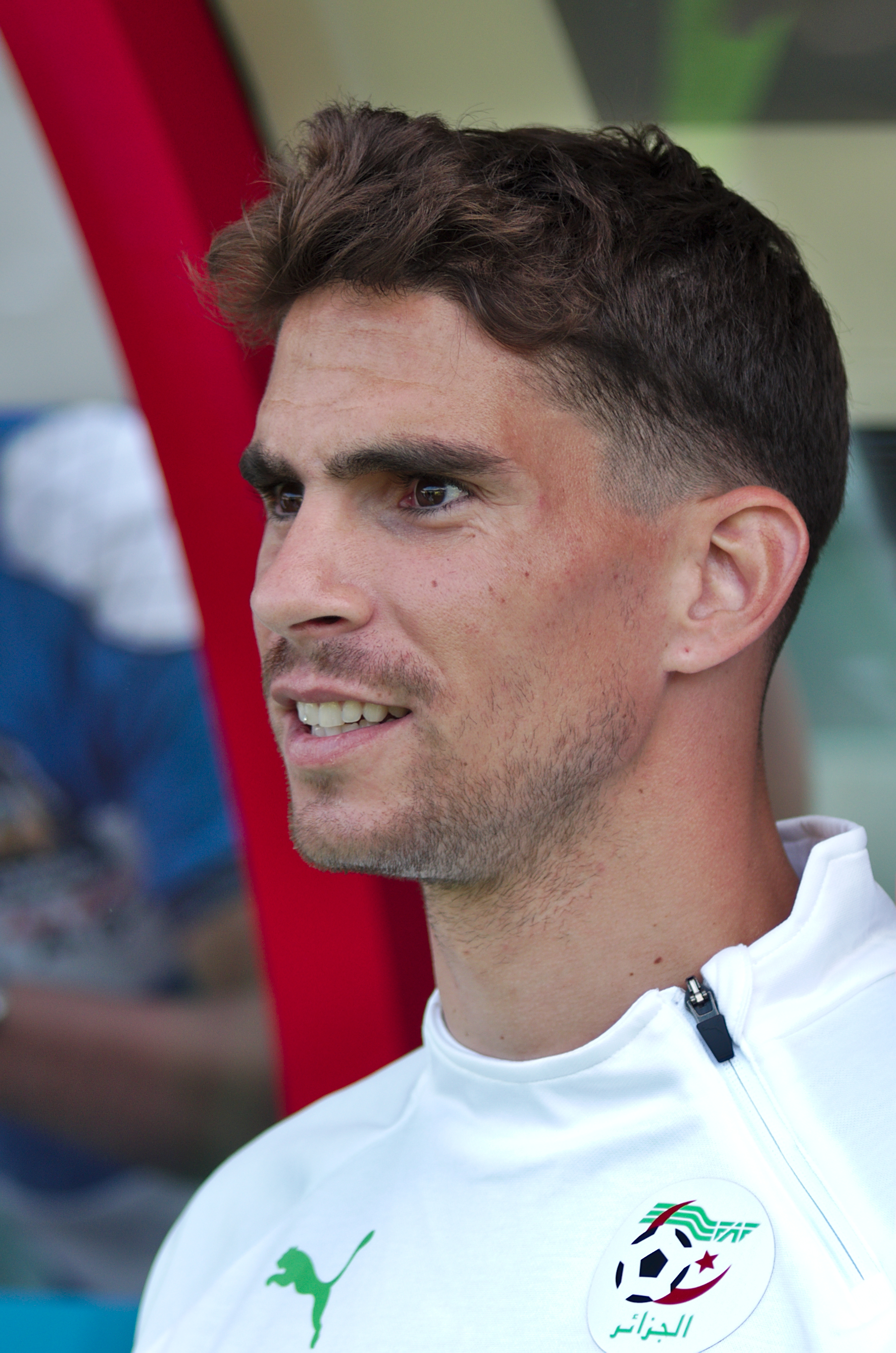
- Medjani playing for Algeria in 2014

Personal information
- Full name: Carl Medjani
- Date of birth: 15 May 1985 (age 41)
- Place of birth: Lyon, France
- Height: 1.84 m (6 ft 0 in)
- Positions: Centre back; defensive midfielder

Youth career
- 1998–2003: Saint-Étienne

Senior career*
Years	Team	Apps	(Gls)
2003–2006	Liverpool	0	(0)
2004–2005	→ Lorient (loan)	25	(0)
2005–2006	→ Metz (loan)	23	(0)
2006–2007	Lorient	9	(0)
2007–2013	Ajaccio	184	(8)
2013–2014	Monaco	15	(0)
2013	→ Olympiacos (loan)	4	(0)
2014	→ Valenciennes (loan)	16	(1)
2014–2016	Trabzonspor	38	(8)
2016	Levante	14	(1)
2016–2017	Leganés	8	(0)
2017	Trabzonspor	13	(0)
2017–2019	Sivasspor	37	(0)
2019–2020	Ohod	15	(3)
2020	FC Salaise		
2022–2025	Olympique Salaise Rhodia	18	(2)
Total		401	(21)

International career
2001–2002	France U16	16	(0)
2002–2003	France U17	10	(0)
2003–2004	France U18	8	(0)
2004–2006	France U21	5	(1)
2010–2018	Algeria	62	(4)
Medal record
Men's football
Representing France
UEFA European Under-17 Championship
Runner-up	2002 Denmark
- * Club domestic league appearances and goals

Carl Medjani (Arabic: كارل مجاني; born 15 May 1985) is a former professional footballer who played as a central defender or defensive midfielder. He spent most of his career in France, his country of birth, while representing the Algeria national team at international level.

== Club career ==
=== Liverpool ===
After spending his youth development years at Saint-Étienne, he was signed by Liverpool's manager Gérard Houllier in August 2003. Liverpool beat off stiff competition from Premiership rivals Arsenal, Manchester United and German giants Bayern Munich to secure his services. In an interview with L'Équipe, Medjani revealed he left Saint-Étienne because he was willing to stay if given an opportunity with the first team, but his request was turned down by manager Frédéric Antonetti.

Medjani then struggled to break in Liverpool first team so he was sent on loan to Lorient for the whole 2004–05 season by new Liverpool manager Rafael Benítez, where he made 25 appearances. Despite impressing in the Toulon under-20 tournament in summer 2005, Benítez deemed it necessary for him to gain more experience and so he spent 2005–06 on loan at Metz.

=== Lorient ===
At the start of the 2006–07 season, he rejoined Lorient, this time on a permanent basis.

=== Ajaccio ===
In the 2007–08 season, Medjani moved down to Ligue 2 joining Ajaccio for the remainder of the season.

The 2008–09 season earned Medjani a permanent move with the club on a three-year deal. He soon made an immediate impact when he scored his first goal in the second round of Coupe de la Ligue during Ajaccio's 4–2 loss against Montpellier. On 20 February 2009, Medjani came on as a substitute in the second half and 18 minutes into the game, he was sent off, along with Brahim Ferradj in the same minute, as Ajaccio drew 1–1 with Brest. Medjani scored his first league goal of the season during Ajaccio's 3–1 defeat to Strasbourg.

Following the 2009–10 season and the World Cup, Medjani was linked with Ligue 2 side Nantes. Ajaccio finished as runners-up in Ligue 2 resulting in their promotion to Ligue 1. Medjani signed a two-year contract extension until 2013. In the 2011–12 season, Medjani continued to be in the first team, either playing in centre back and defensive midfield. Medjani scored his first goal in a 3–1 loss against Paris Saint-Germain on 16 October 2011. On 10 December 2012, Medjani made a mistake in the final minutes, allowing Daniel Niculae to score in a 2–2 draw against Nancy, in a match which could have ended Ajaccio thirteen games without winning. In April, he scored his second goal of the season, in a 1–1 draw against Saint-Étienne.

Ahead of the 2012–13 season, Medjani expressed his desire to leave the club. In December, Medjani started to wear the captain's armband.

=== Monaco ===
In January 2013, just prior to the closing of the transfer window, Medjani joined Monaco on a three-and-a-half-year contract from Ajaccio.

Following Monaco promotion, Medjani was told by Manager Claudio Ranieri that his first team appearances would be limited following the club's spending spree.

=== Loan spells ===
In July 2013, Medjani was sent out on loan to Olympiacos from Monaco until 1 January 2014, with the option of a permanent move. After six months with few appearances at Olympiacos, he returned to his parent club.

Upon his return to France, Monaco then loaned him out to Valenciennes till the end of 2013–14 season.

Following his loan spell at Valenciennes, his time at Monaco came to an end despite having two years of his contract left.

=== Trabzonspor ===
After leaving Monaco, Medjani was linked with a move to Trabzonspor and Cagliari, before joining Trabzonspor on a three-year contract. He scored his first goal for the club in the play-off round of the Europa League as Trabzonspor beat Rostov 2–0 in the first leg.

=== Levante and Leganés ===
On 30 January 2016, La Liga side Levante have signed Medjani until the end of the season, with an option to extend the contract for another season. On 25 July, after suffering relegation, he signed a one-year contract with Leganés, also in the main category.

On 9 January 2017, Medjani rescinded with Lega and signed with Trabzonspor again.

== International career ==
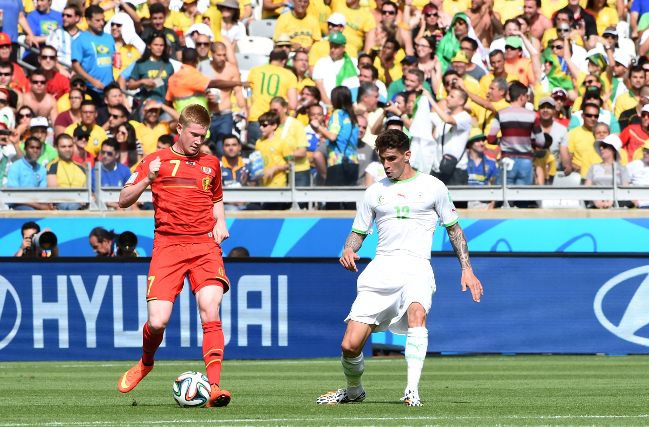
Medjani playing for Algeria against Belgium at the 2014 FIFA World Cup

Medjani has an Algerian father and a French mother, and was eligible for both national teams. Medjani captained the France U21 team in the Toulon Tournament of 2006.

However, being of Algerian origin, he made the switch to represent Algeria in international competitions and was called up by Rabah Saâdane to the Algeria national team's preliminary squad for the 2010 FIFA World Cup, before going on to make the full tournament squad.

On 10 December 2012, it was announced that Medjani was selected in the 40-man provisional squad for the 2013 Africa Cup of Nations. Medjani survived the cuts, firstly to the 24-man list announced on 18 December 2012, and then to the final squad of twenty-three.

Having won 25 caps by this point, Medjani made his second FIFA World Cup squad by winning a place in the Algerian cohort for the 2014 FIFA World Cup. A year and ten appearances later, Medjani joined the Algeria team at the 2015 Africa Cup of Nations.

== Personal life ==
While growing up, Medjani revered boxer Muhammad Ali.

== Career statistics ==
=== Club ===
Appearances and goals by club, season and competition
Club	Season	League			Cup		League Cup		Other		Total	
Club	Season	Division	Apps	Goals	Apps	Goals	Apps	Goals	Apps	Goals	Apps	Goals
Lorient (loan)	2004–05	Ligue 2	25	0	0	0	0	0	0	0	25	0
Metz	2005–06	Ligue 1	23	0	2	0	0	0	0	0	25	0
Lorient	2006–07	Ligue 1	9	0	1	0	0	0	0	0	10	0
Ajaccio	2007–08	Ligue 2	35	1	0	0	1	0	0	0	36	1
Ajaccio	2008–09	Ligue 2	33	1	3	0	1	1	0	0	37	2
Ajaccio	2009–10	Ligue 2	31	1	2	0	1	0	0	0	34	1
Ajaccio	2010–11	Ligue 2	31	2	1	0	4	0	0	0	36	2
Ajaccio	2011–12	Ligue 1	35	2	2	0	0	0	0	0	37	2
Ajaccio	2012–13	Ligue 1	19	1	0	0	1	0	0	0	20	1
Ajaccio	Total		184	8	7	0	8	1	0	0	199	9
Monaco	2012–13	Ligue 2	15	0	0	0	0	0	0	0	15	0
Olympiacos (loan)	2013–14	Super League Greece	4	0	2	0	—		2 (Note: Appearances in UEFA Champions League)	0	8	0
Valenciennes (loan)	2013–14	Ligue 1	16	1	0	0	0	0	0	0	16	1
Trabzonspor	2014–15	Süper Lig	30	7	3	0	—		9 (Note: Appearances in UEFA Europa League)	1	42	8
Trabzonspor	2015–16	Süper Lig	8	1	0	0	—		4	0	12	1
Trabzonspor	Total		38	8	3	0	0	0	13	1	54	9
Levante	2015–16	La Liga	14	1	0	0	—		0	0	14	1
Leganés	2016–17	La Liga	8	0	2	0	—		0	0	10	0
Trabzonspor	2016–17	Süper Lig	13	0	2	0	—		0	0	15	0
Trabzonspor	2017–18	Süper Lig	0	0	0	0	—		0	0	0	0
Trabzonspor	Total		13	0	2	0	0	0	0	0	15	0
Sivasspor	2017–18	Süper Lig	22	0	1	0	—		0	0	23	0
Sivasspor	2018–19	Süper Lig	15	0	1	0	—		0	0	16	0
Sivasspor	Total		37	0	2	0	0	0	0	0	39	0
Ohod	2018–19	Saudi Professional League	15	3	0	0	—		0	0	15	3
Career total			401	21	21	0	8	1	15	1	445	23

=== International goals ===
Scores and results list Algeria's goal tally first, score column indicates score after each Medjani goal.

List of international goals scored by Carl Medjani
No.	Date	Venue	Opponent	Score	Result	Competition
1	12 October 2013	Stade du 4 Août, Ouagadougou, Burkina Faso	Burkina Faso	2–2	2–3	2014 FIFA World Cup qualification
2	10 September 2014	Stade Mustapha Tchaker, Blida, Algeria	Mali	1–0	1–0	2015 Africa Cup of Nations qualification
3	17 November 2015	Stade Mustapha Tchaker, Blida, Algeria	Tanzania	6–0	7–0	2018 FIFA World Cup qualification
4	22 March 2018	5 July 1962 Stadium, Algiers, Algeria	Tanzania	3–1	4–1	Friendly
