= Ante Bukvić =

Luxembourgish footballer

Personal information
- Date of birth: 14 November 1987 (age 38)
- Place of birth: Zadar, SFR Yugoslavia
- Height: 1.99 m (6 ft 6 in)
- Position: Centre back

Team information
- Current team: Medernach

Youth career
- FC The Belval Belvaux

Senior career*
Years	Team	Apps	(Gls)
2007–2019	Differdange 03	189	(5)
2017–2018	→ Hamm Benfica (loan)	25	(3)
2019–2020	Weiler	1	(0)
2020–2024	Medernach	19	(1)
2024–	Lintgen	0	(0)

International career^{‡}
	Luxembourg U21	10	(0)
2009–2013	Luxembourg	10	(0)
- * Club domestic league appearances and goals as of 31 May 2025 ‡ National team caps and goals as of 29 May 2014

Ante Bukvić (born 14 November 1987) is a Luxembourgish international footballer who plays club football for Lintgen, as a defender.

Born in Zadar, SR Croatia, SFR Yugoslavia, he has been playing football for Luxembourg national football team since 2009.

== Career ==
Ahead of the 2019–20 season, Bukvić joined FC Yellow Boys Weiler-La-Tour.
