= Sevim Demircan =

Turkish para-athlete (born 2000)

Personal information
- Born: 15 February 2000 (age 26) Burhaniye, Balıkesir, Turkey

Sport
- Country: Turkey
- Sport: Para-Athletics
- Disability class: T20
- Event(s): 200m, 400 m
Medal record
Track and field
Representing Turkey
INAS Indoor Athletics Championships
Gold medal – first place	2018 Val-de-Reuil	400m
World Para Athletics Junior Championships
Bronze medal – third place	2019 Nottwil	400m T20 (U20)

Sevim Demircan (born 15 February 2000) is a Turkish female para-athlete competing in the T20 disability class sprint events of 200 m and 400 m.

== Private life ==
Sevim Demircan was born in Burhaniye district of Balıkesir on 15 February 2000.

== Sports career ==
At the 2017 World Para Athletics Grand Prix in Dubai, United Arab Emirates, she placed seventh in the 200 m T20/38/44/47 event. She became world champion in the 400 m event at the 2018 INAS Indoor Athletics Championships held in Val-de-Reuil, France. She won the bronze medal in the 400 m T20 event at the 2019 World Para Athletics Junior Championships held in Nottwil, Switzerland.

== Achievements ==
Year	Competition	Place	!Event	Result	Notes
2018	INAS Indoor Athletics Championships	France, Val-de-Reuil	400 m	1st place, gold medalist(s)	1:04.59
2019	World Para Athletics Junior Championships	Switzerland, Nottwil	400 m T20 (U20)	3rd place, bronze medalist(s)	1:04.79
