= İbrahim Demir =

Turkish footballer

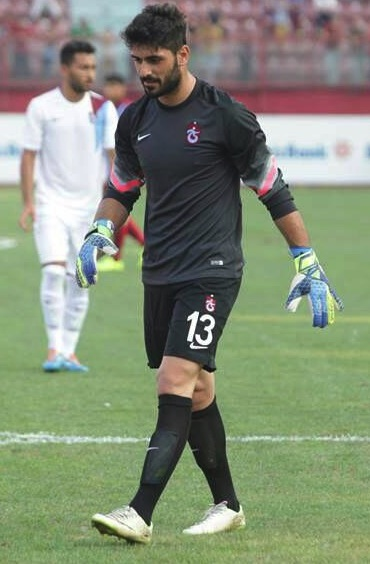

Personal information
- Date of birth: 2 September 1995 (age 31)
- Place of birth: Trabzon, Turkey
- Height: 1.90 m (6 ft 3 in)
- Position: Goalkeeper

Team information
- Current team: Sakaryaspor
- Number: 13

Youth career
- 2006–2010: Trabzonspor
- 2010–2012: 1461 Trabzon
- 2012–2013: Trabzonspor

Senior career*
Years	Team	Apps	(Gls)
2013–2017	Trabzonspor	3	(0)
2015–2016	→ 1461 Trabzon (loan)	7	(0)
2016–2017	→ 1461 Trabzon (loan)	27	(0)
2017–2018	Şanlıurfaspor	5	(0)
2018–2020	Kırklarelispor	50	(0)
2020–2023	Serik Belediyespor	87	(0)
2023–2024	Sakaryaspor	1	(0)
2024–2026	Serikspor	18	(0)
2026–	Sakaryaspor	0	(0)

International career
2013–2014	Turkey U19	2	(0)
- * Club domestic league appearances and goals as of 1 October 2026

İbrahim Demir (born 2 September 1995) is a Turkish footballer who plays as a goalkeeper for TFF 2. Lig club Sakaryaspor.
