= Muhammet Beşir =

Turkish footballer

Personal information
- Date of birth: 1 January 1997 (age 29)
- Place of birth: Araklı, Turkey
- Height: 1.82 m (6 ft 0 in)
- Position: Forward

Team information
- Current team: Çorluspor
- Number: 97

Youth career
- 2008–2009: Araklıspor
- 2010–2015: Trabzonspor

Senior career*
Years	Team	Apps	(Gls)
2015–2018	Trabzonspor	7	(1)
2016–2017	→ Şanlıurfaspor (loan)	5	(0)
2017	→ 1461 Trabzon (loan)	15	(3)
2017–2018	→ Samsunspor (loan)	13	(5)
2018–2020	Samsunspor	13	(2)
2019	→ Kırklarelispor (loan)	9	(0)
2020	→ Zonguldak Kömürspor (loan)	7	(0)
2020–2021	Turgutluspor	33	(2)
2021–2022	Niğde Anadolu	18	(2)
2022–2023	Etimesgut Belediyespor	41	(11)
2023–2024	Mardin 1969 SK	24	(6)
2024–2025	İskenderunspor	30	(13)
2025–2026	Adana 01 FK	31	(14)
2026–	Çorluspor	4	(4)

International career
2015–2016	Turkey U-19	7	(1)
- * Club domestic league appearances and goals as of 1 October 2026

Muhammet Beşir (born 1 January 1997) is a Turkish professional footballer who plays for TFF 2. Lig club Çorluspor.

== Career ==
Beşir was promoted to senior level at pre-season camp of Trabzonspor in 2015 summer, however failed to hold onto senior squad. He, later on same season, was selected up to senior squad by interim manager Sadi Tekelioğlu. Beşir picked number 17 for his shirt, due to recommendations of his team mates. He made his Süper Lig debut on 14th match-day home game against Eskişehirspor 7 December 2015. Subbed on Óscar Cardozo on 83rd minute, Beşir scored his debut goal on the dying minutes of the game, ended 3–1 for Trabzonspor.

== Statistics ==
=== Club ===
As of 23 May 2016:

Club	Season	League		Cup		Europe		Total	
Club	Season	Apps	Goals	Apps	Goals	Apps	Goals	Apps	Goals
Trabzonspor	2015–16	7	1	6	2	—		13	3
Trabzonspor	2016–17	0	0	0	0	—		0	0
Trabzonspor	Total	7	1	6	2	—		13	3
Career total		7	1	6	2	—		13	3
