= Mert Ilıman =

Turkish footballer

Personal information
- Date of birth: 8 October 1995 (age 31)
- Place of birth: Çorum, Turkey
- Height: 1.72 m (5 ft 8 in)
- Position: Left back

Team information
- Current team: Darıca Gençlerbirliği
- Number: 14

Youth career
- 2005–2009: Çorum Gençlerbirliği
- 2009–2010: Osmanlıspor
- 2010–2011: Bursa Merinosspor
- 2011–2012: Bursaspor

Senior career*
Years	Team	Apps	(Gls)
2012–2015	Bursaspor	0	(0)
2013–2015	→ Yeşil Bursa SK (loan)	60	(5)
2015–2016	Karagümrük	32	(0)
2016–2017	Kayserispor	2	(0)
2017	→ BB Erzurumspor (loan)	6	(0)
2017	Bodrumspor	8	(0)
2018–2019	24 Erzincanspor	12	(2)
2019–2020	Çorum FK	42	(0)
2020–2021	Kahramanmaraşspor	30	(1)
2021–2022	Kırşehir FK	28	(2)
2022–2023	Beyoğlu Yeni Çarşı	11	(0)
2023	Büyükçekmece Tepecikspor	11	(0)
2023–	Darıca Gençlerbirliği	2	(0)
- * Club domestic league appearances and goals as of 1 October 2023

Mert Ilıman (born 8 October 1995) is a Turkish footballer who plays as a left back for Darıca Gençlerbirliği. He can also play as a midfielder, or winger. He is a product of the Bursaspor youth academy.
