= Sefa Yılmaz =

Turkish footballer

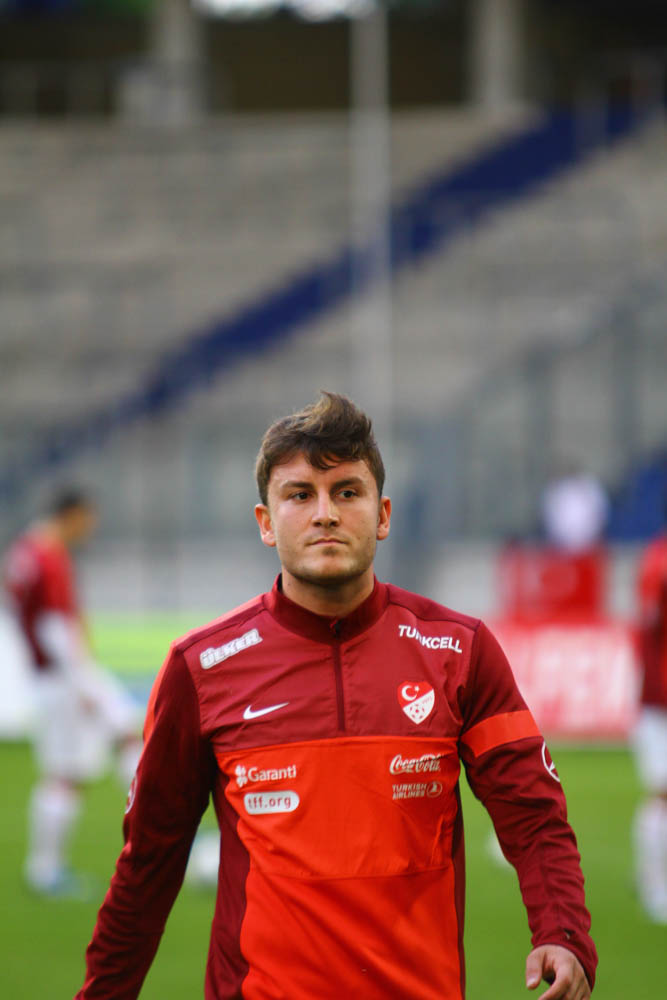
- Yılmaz in 2013

Personal information
- Date of birth: 14 February 1990 (age 36)
- Place of birth: Berlin, Germany
- Height: 1.83 m (6 ft 0 in)
- Position: Winger

Youth career
- 2004: Eintracht Südring Berlin
- 2004–2005: 1. FC Schöneberg
- –2005: Tennis Borussia Berlin
- 2005–2008: VfL Wolfsburg

Senior career*
Years	Team	Apps	(Gls)
2008–2010	VfL Wolfsburg II	52	(9)
2010–2011	MSV Duisburg	31	(6)
2011–2014	Kayserispor	83	(14)
2014–2017	Trabzonspor	26	(6)
2016	→ Alanyaspor (loan)	9	(1)
2017	→ Gaziantepspor (loan)	13	(1)
2017–2018	Boluspor	20	(2)
2018–2019	Altınordu	29	(5)
2019–2021	Gençlerbirliği	52	(4)
2021–2022	Sivasspor	22	(0)
2022–2023	Çaykur Rizespor	19	(1)
2023–2024	Bucaspor 1928	41	(6)
2025	Kepezspor	11	(2)

International career^{‡}
2012	Turkey U21	1	(0)
2012	Turkey A2	2	(2)
2013	Turkey	2	(0)
- * Club domestic league appearances and goals as of 2 May 2025 ‡ National team caps and goals as of 20:56, 26 May 2022 (UTC)

Sefa Yılmaz (born 14 February 1990) is a Turkish footballer who plays as a winger.

== International ==
Sefa was eligible to play for the German Football Association, but switched permanently to the Turkey national football team.

== Honours ==
Sivasspor

- Turkish Cup: 2021–22
