= İshak Doğan =

Turkish footballer

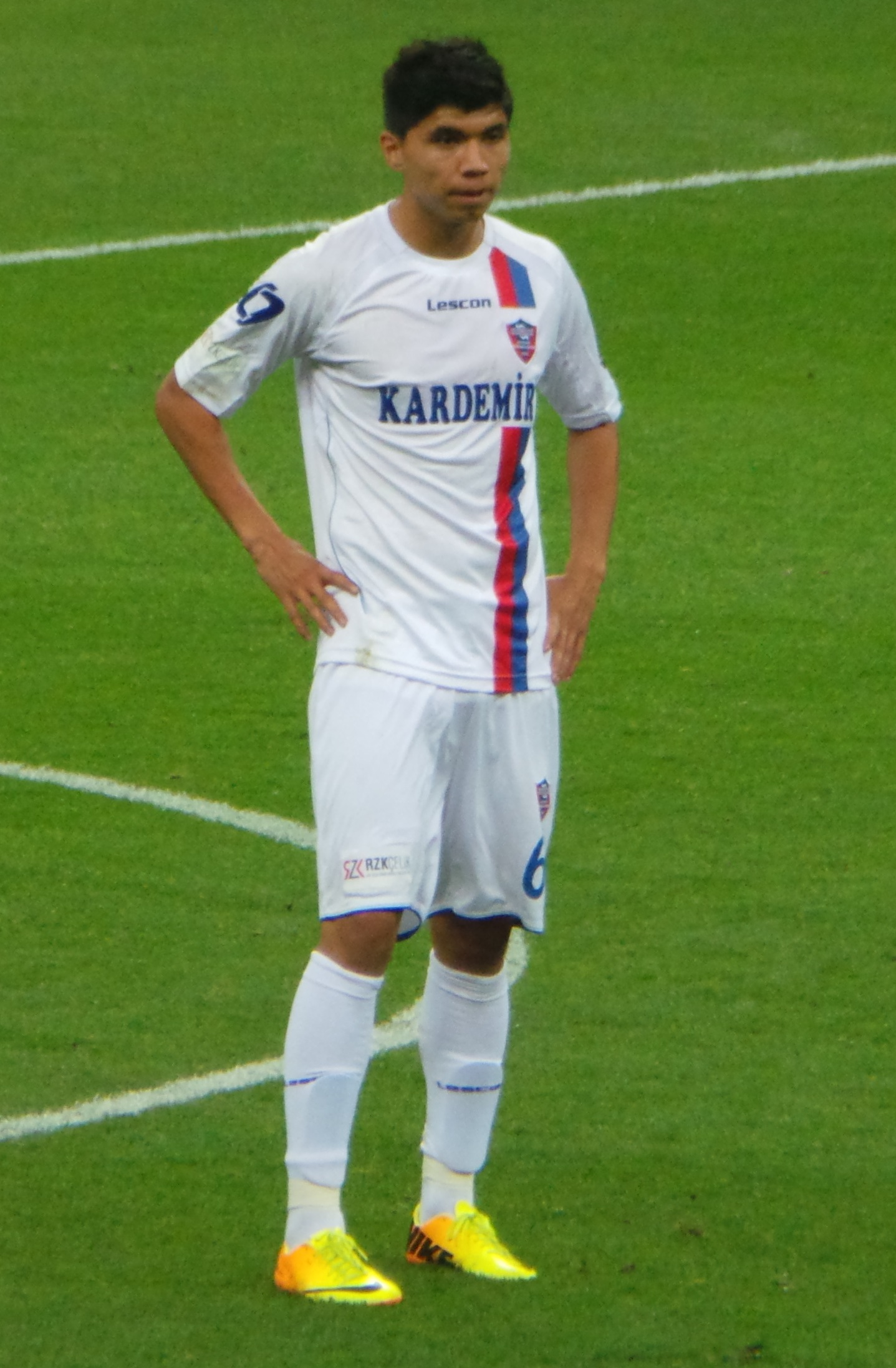

Personal information
- Date of birth: 9 August 1990 (age 36)
- Place of birth: Hagen, West Germany
- Height: 1.87 m (6 ft 2 in)
- Position: Left back

Team information
- Current team: TSG Sprockhövel
- Number: 15

Youth career
- –2002: SV Fortuna Hagen
- 2002–2005: Sportfreunde Geweke
- 2005–2009: SG Wattenscheid 09

Senior career*
Years	Team	Apps	(Gls)
2009–2011	Arminia Bielefeld II	30	(4)
2011–2012	Ankaragücü	22	(1)
2012–2014	Karabükspor	41	(0)
2014–2016	Trabzonspor	11	(0)
2016	→ Eskişehirspor (loan)	2	(0)
2016–2018	Karabükspor	20	(0)
2018–2019	Samsunspor	14	(0)
2020–2021	Giresunspor	4	(0)
2021–2022	Kahramanmaraşspor	16	(0)
2022–	TSG Sprockhövel	107	(12)

International career
2012–	Turkey A2	3	(0)
2013–2014	Turkey	4	(0)
- * Club domestic league appearances and goals as of 4 February 2026

İshak Doğan (born 9 August 1990) is a Turkish professional footballer who plays as a left back for German club TSG Sprockhövel.

== Career ==
Ishak made his Süper Lig debut on 19 November 2011.
