= Fatih Atik =

French footballer (born 1984)

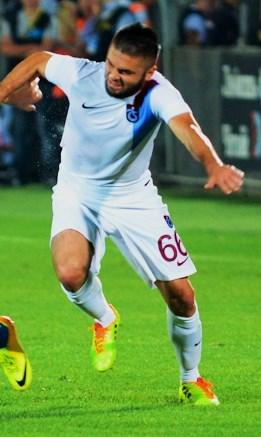
- Atik playing for Trabzonspor in 2014

Personal information
- Date of birth: 25 February 1984 (age 42)
- Place of birth: Gleizé, France
- Height: 1.75 m (5 ft 9 in)
- Positions: Attacking midfielder; right midfielder

Youth career
- 1991–2003: Montpellier

Senior career*
Years	Team	Apps	(Gls)
2003–2007	Montpellier	79	(7)
2007–2008	Sivasspor	0	(0)
2008–2010	Tours	71	(12)
2010–2011	Boulogne	33	(1)
2011–2014	Guingamp	80	(11)
2014–2016	Trabzonspor	29	(0)
2016–2017	Karabükspor	1	(0)
2017–2019	Giresunspor	29	(3)
- * Club domestic league appearances and goals as of 1 April 2019

Fatih Atik (born 25 February 1984) is a French professional footballer. He most recently played as a midfielder for the Turkish TFF First League side Giresunspor.

== Career ==
On 16 April 2014, Atik scored an extra-time goal in the semi-final which helped Guingamp to a shock 3–1 in over Monaco and advance to the 2014 Coupe de France Final, which they went on to win, with him playing the last six minutes against Rennes as a substitute for Claudio Beauvue. His equaliser, in a league match against Monaco on 7 May, handed the Ligue 1 title to Paris Saint-Germain.

== Personal life ==
Atik was born in Gleizé, France. He is Turkish descent.

== Honours ==
Guingamp

- Coupe de France: 2013–14
