= Yavuz Aygün =

Turkish footballer (born 1996)

Personal information
- Date of birth: 27 June 1996 (age 30)
- Place of birth: Arsin, Turkey
- Height: 1.93 m (6 ft 4 in)
- Position: Goalkeeper

Team information
- Current team: Kastamonuspor 1966
- Number: 1

Youth career
- 2007–2009: Trabzonspor
- 2009–2013: 1461 Trabzon
- 2013–2015: Trabzonspor

Senior career*
Years	Team	Apps	(Gls)
2016	Trabzonspor	1	(0)
2016–2019	Göztepe	0	(0)
2019	→ Yeni Orduspor (loan)	12	(0)
2019–2021	Boluspor	4	(0)
2021–2022	Fatih Karagümrük	1	(0)
2022–2023	Isparta 32 Spor	2	(0)
2023–2024	Alanyaspor	0	(0)
2024	Konyaspor	0	(0)
2025	Zimbru Chișinău	0	(0)
2025–	Kastamonuspor 1966	12	(0)
- * Club domestic league appearances and goals as of 8 November 2025

Yavuz Aygün (born 27 June 1996) is a Turkish professional football player who plays as a goalkeeper for TFF 2. Lig club Kastamonuspor 1966.

== Professional career ==
Yavuz made his professional debut for Trabzonspor in a 6–0 Süper Lig loss to Kasımpaşa on 19 May 2016.
