= Berke Demircan =

Turkish footballer

Personal information
- Full name: Bahattin Berke Demircan
- Date of birth: 25 November 2002 (age 23)
- Place of birth: Istanbul, Turkey
- Height: 1.83 m (6 ft 0 in)
- Position: Forward

Team information
- Current team: Beyoğlu Yeni Çarşı
- Number: 91

Senior career*
Years	Team	Apps	(Gls)
2019–2021	Tuzlaspor	2	(0)
2021–2024	Fatih Karagümrük	1	(0)
2022–2023	→ Isparta 32 SK (loan)	31	(9)
2023–2024	→ Vanspor FK (loan)	31	(4)
2024–	Beyoğlu Yeni Çarşı	39	(21)
- * Club domestic league appearances and goals as of 19 August 2024

Bahattin Berke Demircan (born 25 November 2002) is a Turkish footballer who plays as a forward for TFF 2. Lig club Beyoğlu Yeni Çarşı.

== Career ==
Demircan began his career with Tuzlaspor, before moving to Fatih Karagümrük in the summer of 2021. He made his professional debut with Fatih Karagümrük in a 1–1 Süper Lig tie with Alanyaspor on 26 December 2021.
