= Aykut Demir =

Turkish footballer (born 1988)

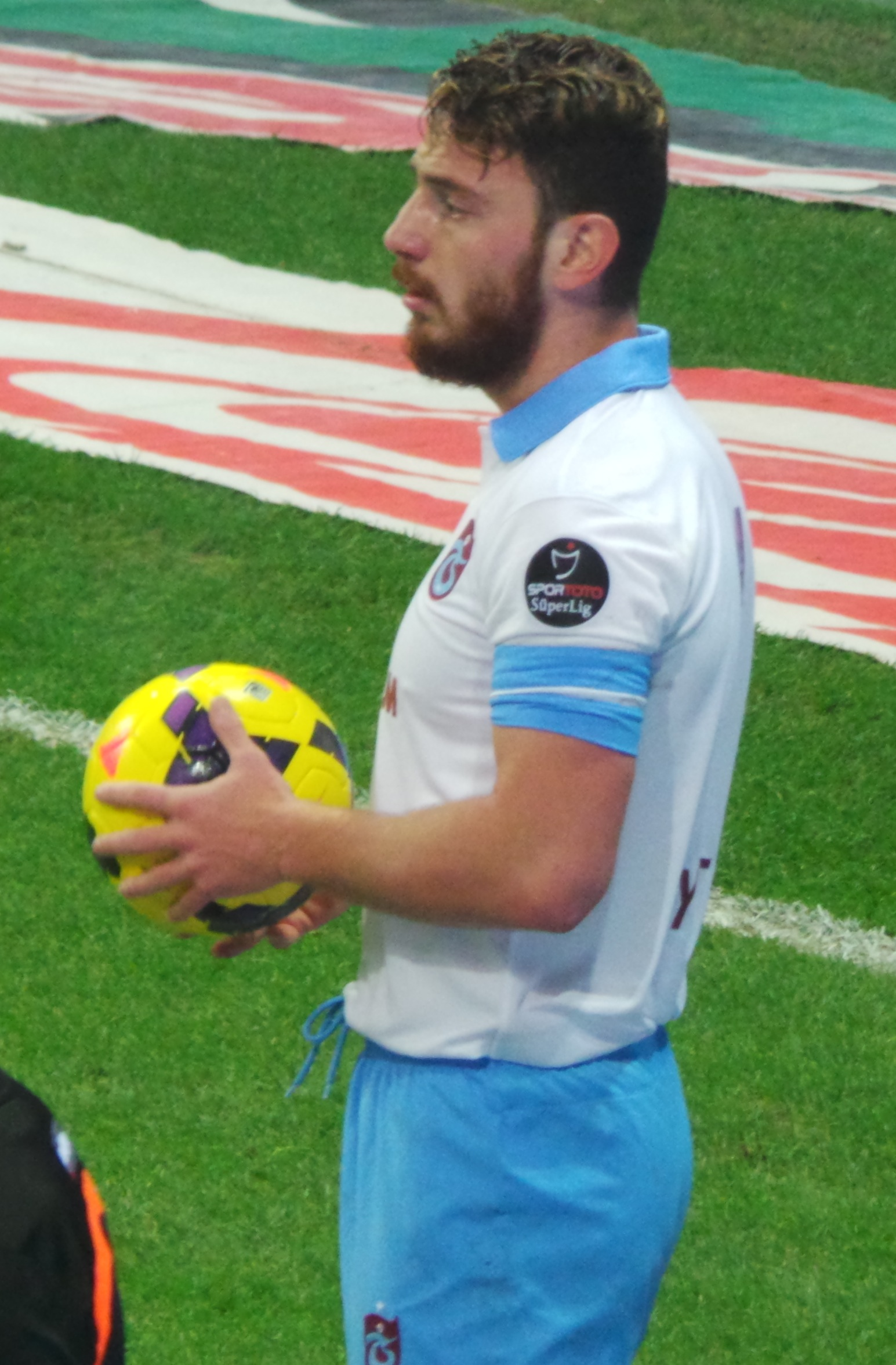
- Demir playing for Trabzonspor in 2013

Personal information
- Full name: Muhammet Aykut Demir
- Date of birth: 22 October 1988 (age 38)
- Place of birth: Bergen op Zoom, Netherlands
- Height: 1.80 m (5 ft 11 in)
- Position: Centre back

Youth career
- 1995–1998: DOSKO
- 1998–2005: NAC Breda

Senior career*
Years	Team	Apps	(Gls)
2005–2009	NAC	9	(0)
2008–2009	→ Excelsior (loan)	50	(2)
2009–2013	Gençlerbirliği	119	(8)
2013–2017	Trabzonspor	62	(1)
2016–2017	→ Osmanlıspor (loan)	9	(0)
2017–2019	Giresunspor	39	(2)
2019–2020	BB Erzurumspor	23	(0)
2020–2021	Boluspor	24	(1)
2021–2022	BB Erzurumspor	22	(1)
2022–2023	Ankara Keçiörengücü	10	(1)

International career
2005	Turkey U17	3	(0)
2005–2006	Turkey U18	6	(0)
2006–2007	Turkey U19	12	(0)
2008–2010	Turkey U21	15	(0)
2011–2013	Turkey A2	13	(1)
2013	Turkey	1	(0)
- * Club domestic league appearances and goals as of 12 June 2023

Aykut Demir (born 22 October 1988) is a professional footballer who plays as a centre back. Born in the Netherlands, he represents Turkey at the international level.

== Club career ==
Demir made his debut in professional football in the 2005–06 season as part of the NAC Breda squad. He was loaned to Excelsior and later played for Turkish side Gençlerbirliği before joining Trabzonspor.

In 2017, he moved to TFF First League club Giresunspor. In 2019, he signed to BB Erzurumspor. After a one-year stint with Boluspor, he returned to BB Erzurumspor in July 2021.

== Personal life ==
Demir is Muslim. He was born on 22 October 1988 in Bergen op Zoom, Netherlands.

=== Controversies ===
On 31 December, Demir was married at age 28. Since his bride was not at the wedding, it was unknown who he married.

He was criticized for wearing a taqiya and having a Tawhid flag in his wedding hall.

In BB Erzurumspor's match with MKE Ankaragücü on 2021–22 TFF First League's 27. match week, All Erzurumspor players wore a "no to war" pre-match ceremony shirt in support of Ukraine, except Demir, who refused to wear the shirt. In response to the criticism, he told the media that he did not wear the shirt because he "wouldn't be comfortable wearing it while there were civilians dying in Palestine."

== International career ==
Demir made his debut for Turkey in a November 2013 friendly match against Belarus.
