= Luis Pedro Cavanda =

Belgian footballer

Personal information
- Date of birth: 2 January 1991 (age 35)
- Place of birth: Luanda, Angola
- Height: 1.80 m (5 ft 11 in)
- Position: Right-back

Youth career
- –2007: Standard Liège
- 2007–2010: Lazio Primavera

Senior career*
Years	Team	Apps	(Gls)
2009–2015	Lazio	78	(1)
2011	→ Torino (loan)	3	(0)
2012	→ Bari (loan)	8	(0)
2015–2016	Trabzonspor	25	(0)
2016–2018	Galatasaray	7	(0)
2018–2020	Standard Liège	49	(2)
2022–2023	Neuchâtel Xamax	6	(0)

International career
2009	Belgium U18	10	(0)
2009–2010	Belgium U19	9	(0)
2010–2012	Belgium U21	7	(0)
2015	Belgium	2	(0)
- * Club domestic league appearances and goals as of 27 May 2023

Luis Pedro Cavanda (born 2 January 1991) is a professional footballer who plays as a right-back. Born in Angola, he has represented the Belgium national team.

== Career ==
=== Youth ===
Cavanda moved to Belgium at a young age and began playing for the Belgian club Standard Liège. In January 2007, Cavanda joined Lazio. With Lazio, Cavanda spent three-and-a-half years with the youth side.

=== Lazio ===
In 2009, Cavanda made a substitute appearance in a 4–0 win away to Bulgarian club Levski Sofia in the UEFA Europa League. He got his first start in the return match at the Stadio Olimpico, which Lazio lost 0–1.

On 29 August 2010, Cavanda made his Serie A debut, replacing Simone Del Nero in the second half of Lazio's opening day 2–0 loss to Sampdoria at the Stadio Luigi Ferraris.

His first league start for Lazio came at the Stadio Olimpico against eventual champions Milan. Cavanda earned plaudits with an impressive display against former FIFA World Player of the Year and World Cup winner Ronaldinho.

In January 2011, he was loaned to Torino until the end of the season. Cavanda returned to Lazio after making just three appearances for the Turin club.

Having played regularly in Serie A and in the Europa League during the 2011–12 season, Cavanda cemented his spot as a first choice in the 2012–13 season, replacing Abdoulay Konko. Predominantly playing at right back, Cavanda also played at left back, making him a very versatile full back. Cavanda matured under manager Vladimir Petkovic and became an important player in Lazio's squad.

=== Trabzonspor ===
On 12 July 2015, Cavanda signed for Turkish side Trabzonspor.

=== Galatasaray ===
Cavanda signed a three-year contract with Turkish club Galatasaray on 9 August 2016 for an initial fee of €1.8 million.

=== Standard Liège ===
On 17 March 2018, he played as Standard Liège beat Genk 1–0 in extra time to win the 2018 Belgian Cup Final and qualify for the UEFA Europa League.

=== Failure to join with Trepça'89 ===
On 17 February 2021, he signed for Kosovan club Trepça '89 in the Kosovar Superliga. Two days later, he refused to sign the final contract because he did not like the club infrastructure.

=== Neuchâtel Xamax ===
On 23 May 2022 Swiss Challenge League club Neuchâtel Xamax confirmed, that Cavanda had joined the club on a one-year deal. After six appearances for the club, Cavanda broke a bone in his face during a training session at the end of August 2022.

== International career ==
On 10 October 2015, he made his senior debut for the national team in a 4–1 win in a UEFA Euro 2016 qualification match against Andorra.

== Personal life ==
Cavanda was born in Angola, to an Angolan father and a Congolese mother, and migrated to Belgium at a young age. He holds Belgian nationality. Despite having made youth level appearances for Belgium, Cavanda remained eligible to represent the Angolan and the Congolese national teams. Even though he initially opted for the latter in March 2015, he was called up by the Belgium national football team on 2 October 2015. He plays in the UEFA qualifying game for the nation cup in France against Andorra. This means he only can play for Belgium now.

== Statistics ==
Statistics accurate as of match played 26 October 2015

Club	Season	League		Cup		Europe		Other		Total	
Club	Season	Apps	Goals	Apps	Goals	Apps	Goals	Apps	Goals	Apps	Goals
Lazio	2009–10	0	0	0	0	1	0	0	0	1	0
Lazio	2010–11	3	0	0	0	0	0	0	0	3	0
Lazio	Total	3	0	0	0	1	0	0	0	4	0
Torino	2010–11	3	0	0	0	0	0	0	0	3	0
Torino	Total	3	0	0	0	0	0	0	0	3	0
Bari	2011–12	8	0	0	0	0	0	0	0	8	0
Bari	Total	8	0	0	0	0	0	0	0	8	0
Lazio	2011–12	1	0	1	0	1	0	0	0	3	0
Lazio	2012–13	14	0	3	0	7	0	0	0	24	0
Lazio	2013–14	19	1	3	0	7	0	0	0	29	1
Lazio	2014–15	16	0	2	0	0	0	0	0	18	0
Lazio	Total	50	1	9	0	15	0	0	0	74	1
Trabzonspor	2015–16	25	0	1	0	0	0	1	0	27	0
Trabzonspor	Total	25	0	1	0	0	0	1	0	27	0
Career total		34	0	3	0	8	0	0	0	45	0

== Honours ==
Standard Liège

- Belgian Cup: 2017–18
