= Musa Nizam =

Turkish footballer

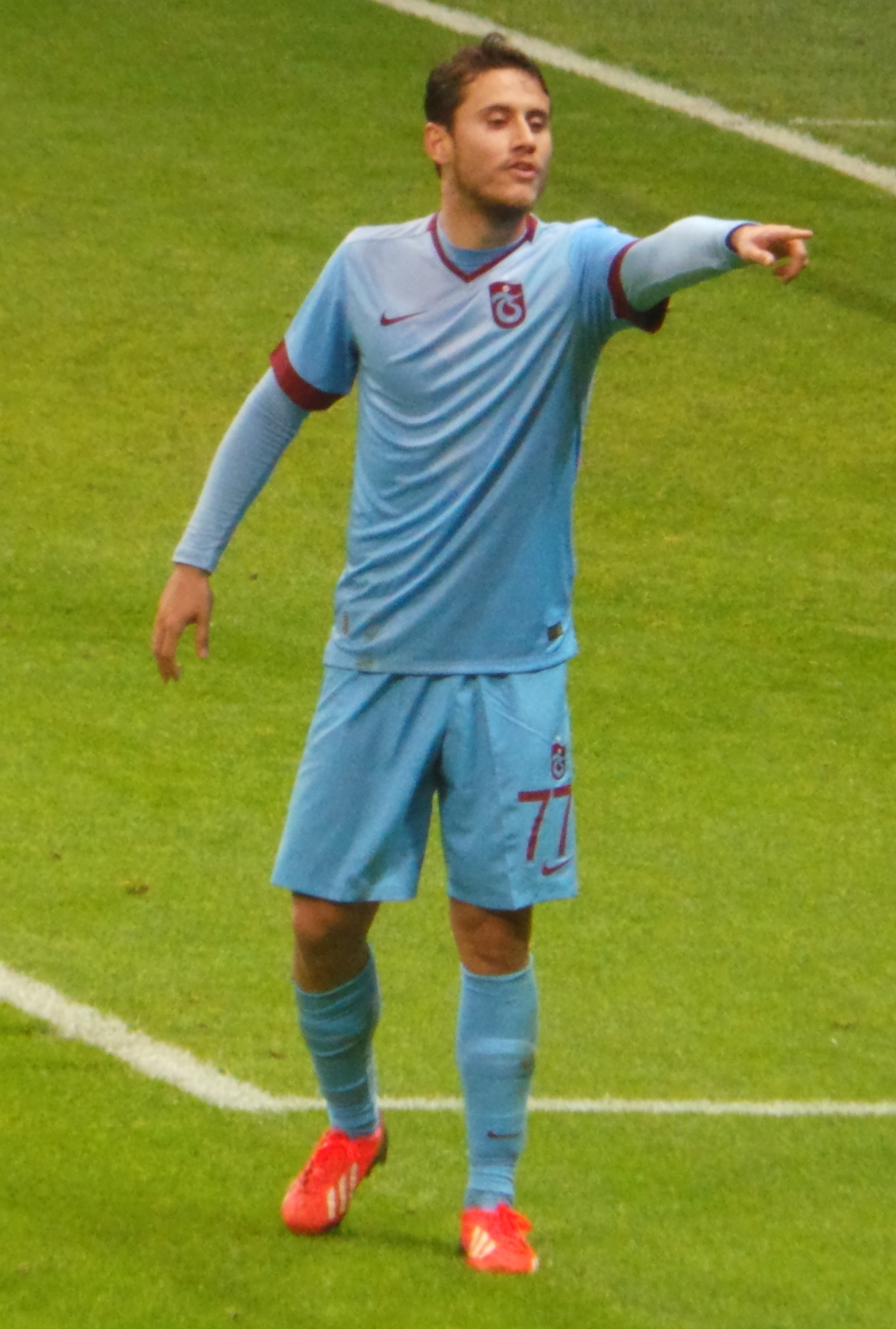

Personal information
- Date of birth: 8 September 1990 (age 36)
- Place of birth: Antalya, Turkey
- Height: 1.82 m (5 ft 11 1/2 in)
- Positions: Left back; centre back

Youth career
- 2000–2001: Kar içecek Sarılarspor
- 2001–2008: Antalyaspor

Senior career*
Years	Team	Apps	(Gls)
2008–2014	Antalyaspor	75	(1)
2011	→ Denizlispor (loan)	11	(0)
2014–2017	Trabzonspor	20	(1)
2016–2017	→ Gaziantepspor (loan)	18	(1)
2017–2019	Antalyaspor	10	(0)
2019–2021	Akhisarspor	36	(1)
2021–2022	Kocaelispor	41	(1)
2022–2023	Isparta 32 SK	29	(1)

International career
2009–2012	Turkey U21	15	(0)
- * Club domestic league appearances and goals as of 20 May 2023

Musa Nizam (born 8 September 1990) is a Turkish footballer who plays as a defender.
