= 2009–10 Trabzonspor season =

Trabzonspor
2009–10 season
- President: Sadri Sener
- Manager: Hugo Broos; Şenol Güneş
- Stadium: Hüseyin Avni Aker Stadium
- Süper Lig: 5th
- Turkish Cup: Winners
- UEFA Europa League: Play-off round
- Top goalscorer: League: Umut Bulut (11); All: Umut Bulut (18)

In the 2009–10 season, Trabzonspor finished in fifth place in the Süper Lig. The club also won the Turkish Cup for an eighth time. The top scorer of the team was Umut Bulut, who scored eighteen goals.

This article shows statistics of the club's players and matches during the season.

== Sponsor ==
- Türk Telekom

== Players ==
Note: Flags indicate national team as defined under FIFA eligibility rules; some limited exceptions apply. Players may hold more than one non-FIFA nationality.

No.	Pos.	Nation	Player
1	GK	SEN	Tony Sylva
3	DF	CRO	Hrvoje Čale
4	DF	CMR	Rigobert Song (1. kaptan)
5	MF	TUR	Engin Baytar
6	MF	TUR	Ceyhun Gülselam
7	MF	TUR	Zafer Yelen
8	MF	TUR	Selçuk İnan (3. kaptan)
10	FW	TUR	Umut Bulut (2. kaptan)
11	MF	TUR	Barış Memiş
15	DF	TUR	Ferhat Öztorun
16	DF	TUR	Egemen Korkmaz (4. kaptan)
17	FW	TUR	Burak Yılmaz
18	DF	TUR	Tayfun Cora

No.	Pos.	Nation	Player
20	MF	ARG	Gustavo Colman
21	FW	TUR	Murat Tosun
23	DF	TUR	Giray Kaçar
25	MF	BRA	Alanzinho
27	MF	TUR	Sezer Badur
29	GK	TUR	Tolga Zengin
30	MF	TUR	Serkan Balcı
33	MF	CRO	Drago Gabrić
35	GK	TUR	Onur Kıvrak
41	DF	TUR	Ömer Aysan Barış
61	FW	GUI	Ibrahim Yattara
90	FW	COL	Teófilo Gutiérrez
99	FW	TUR	Hasan Ahmet Sarı

== Süper Lig ==
Pos	Team	Pld	W	D	L	GF	GA	GD	Pts	Qualification or relegation
3	Galatasaray	34	19	7	8	61	35	+26	64 (Note: Galatasaray finished ahead of Beşiktaş on head-to-head record: Galatasaray–Beşiktaş 3–0, Beşiktaş–Galatasaray 1–1.)	Qualification to Europa League third qualifying round
4	Beşiktaş	34	18	10	6	47	25	+22	64	Qualification to Europa League second qualifying round
5	Trabzonspor	34	16	9	9	53	32	+21	57	Qualification to Europa League play-off round (Note: Trabzonspor won the 2009–10 Turkish Cup and thus qualified for the play-off round of the UEFA Europa League.)
6	İstanbul B.B.	34	16	8	10	47	44	+3	56	
7	Eskişehirspor	34	15	10	9	44	34	+10	55	

Source: Süper Lig official website
Rules for classification: 1st overall points, 2nd head-to-head points, 3rd head-to-head goal differential, 4th overall goal differential, 5th overall goals scored.

== Turkish Cup ==
=== Group stage ===
Pos	Team	Pld	W	D	L	GF	GA	GD	Pts	GAL	TRA	ANK	ORD	DBS
1	Galatasaray	4	3	1	0	10	2	+8	10		2–1			5–1
2	Trabzonspor	4	3	0	1	11	3	+8	9				2–1	6–0
3	Ankaragücü	4	2	1	1	4	3	+1	7	0–0	0–2			
4	Orduspor	4	1	0	3	4	8	−4	3	0–3		1–2		
5	Denizli B.S.K.	4	0	0	4	2	15	−13	0			0–2	1–2	

Source: tff.org (in Turkish)
Legend: Blue = home team win; Yellow = draw; Red = away team win.
Rules for classification: 1) points; 2) goal difference; 3) number of goals scored.

=== Quarterfinals ===
In this round the winners and runners-up of all of the previous round's groups were entered. The draw was conducted at the headquarters of the TFF in Istanbul on 27 January 2010 at 11:00 local time. The teams competed in two-leg playoffs with the first leg occurring on 3 February and the second on 10 February 2010.

The following teams qualified for the Turkish Cup Quarterfinal:

Team 1	Agg.	Team 2	1st leg	2nd leg
Fenerbahçe	4–3	Bursaspor	3–0	1–3
Manisaspor	5–1	Denizlispor	4–1	1–0
Antalyaspor	4–4	Galatasaray	2–1	2–3
İstanbul B.B.	1–2	Trabzonspor	1–1	0–1

=== Semifinals ===
The two legs were played on 24 March and 14 April 2010, respectively.

Team 1	Agg.	Team 2	1st leg	2nd leg
Fenerbahçe	3–1	Manisaspor	2–0	1–1
Trabzonspor	2–1	Antalyaspor	2–0	0–1

=== Final ===
The final was won by Trabzonspor.

5 May 2010
15:45

Fenerbahçe	1 – 3	Trabzonspor
Alex 55'		66' Umut; 80' Engin; 90+4' Colman

Şanlıurfa GAP Stadium, Şanlıurfa
Referee: Cüneyt Çakır

Fenerbahçe

Trabzonspor

Fenerbahçe:
GK	1	(Turkey) Volkan Demirel
RB	77	(Turkey) Gökhan Gönül		(substituted off) 87'
CB	2	(Uruguay) Diego Lugano
CB	58	(Brazil) Fabio Bilica	(yellow card) 71'
LB	6	(Turkey) Gökçek Vederson
DM	5	(Turkey) Emre Belözoğlu	(yellow card) 38'	(substituted off) 68'
DM	21	(Turkey) Selçuk Şahin
RW	66	(Turkey) Mehmet Topuz
AM	10	(Brazil) Alex (c)
LW	20	(Turkey) Özer Hurmacı
CF	9	(Spain) Daniel Güiza
Substitutes:
GK	88	(Turkey) Volkan Babacan
DF	15	(Turkey) Bekir İrtegün
DF	19	(Turkey) Önder Turacı
DF	24	(Turkey) Deniz Barış
FW	23	(Turkey) Semih Şentürk
FW	39	(Turkey) Gökhan Ünal		(substituted on) 87'
FW	99	(Brazil) Deivid de Souza		(substituted on) 68'
Coach:
(Germany) Christoph Daum

Trabzonspor:
GK	35	(Turkey) Onur Kıvrak	(yellow card) 91'
RB	30	(Turkey) Serkan Balcı	(yellow card) 59'
CB	16	(Turkey) Egemen Korkmaz	(yellow card) 87'
CB	4	(Cameroon) Rigobert Song (c)
LB	3	(Croatia) Hrvoje Čale
RM	17	(Turkey) Burak Yılmaz	(yellow card) 85'
CM	20	(Argentina) Gustavo Colman
CM	8	(Turkey) Selçuk İnan		(substituted off) 83'
LM	5	(Turkey) Engin Baytar		(substituted off) 86'
SS	25	(Brazil) Alanzinho		(substituted off) 91'
CF	10	(Turkey) Umut Bulut
Substitutes:
GK	29	(Turkey) Tolga Zengin
DF	23	(Turkey) Giray Kaçar		(substituted on) 91'
DF	6	(Turkey) Ceyhun Gülselam		(substituted on) 86'
MF	27	(Turkey) Sezer Badur		(substituted on) 83'
MF	11	(Turkey) Barış Memiş
MF	33	(Croatia) Drago Gabrić
FW	90	(Colombia) Teófilo Gutiérrez
Coach:
(Turkey) Şenol Güneş

Man of the match:
Engin Baytar (Trabzonspor)
Referee:
(Turkey) Cüneyt Çakır
Assistant referees:
(Turkey) Bahattin Duran
(Turkey) Tarık Ongun
Fourth referee:
(Turkey) Halis Özkahya

== UEFA Europa League ==
=== Play-off round ===
20 August 2009 First leg	Trabzonspor (Turkey)	1–3	(France) Toulouse	Hüseyin Avni Aker Stadium, Trabzon
18:45	Song 16'	Report	Gignac 12', 59'; Mansaré 90+1'	Referee: Pavel Královec (Czech Republic)

27 August 2009 Second leg	Toulouse (France)	0–1 (3–2 agg.)	(Turkey) Trabzonspor	Stadium Municipal, Toulouse
21:00		Report	Gülselam 55'	Attendance: 15,535; Referee: Serge Gumienny (Belgium)
