= 2012–13 Galatasaray S.K. season =

Galatasaray
2012–13 season
- President: Ünal Aysal
- Head coach: Fatih Terim
- Stadium: Türk Telekom Arena
- Süper Lig: 1st
- Turkish Cup: Fifth round
- Turkish Super Cup: Winners
- UEFA Champions League: Quarter-finals
- Top goalscorer: League: Burak Yılmaz (24); All: Burak Yılmaz (32)
- Highest home attendance: 52,044 vs Real Madrid (Champions League, 9 April 2013)
- Lowest home attendance: 5,500 vs Balıkesirspor (Turkish Cup, 28 November 2012)
- Average home league attendance: 43,262
| Home colours | Away colours | Third colours |

The 2012–13 season was Galatasaray's 109th in existence and 55th consecutive season in the Süper Lig. This article shows statistics of the club's players in the season, and also lists all matches that the club played in during the season.

== Club ==
=== Board of directors ===
| Position | Staff |
|---|---|
| President | (Turkey) Ünal Aysal |
| Deputy President | (Turkey) Ali Dürüst |
| Vice-President | (Turkey) Refik Arkan |
| Vice-President | (Turkey) Adnan Öztürk |
| General Secretary | (Turkey) Aka Gündüz Özdemir |
| | (Turkey) Adnan Nas |
| | (Turkey) Semih Haznedaroğlu |
| | (Turkey) Sedat Doğan |
| | (Turkey) Celal Gürcan |
| | (Turkey) Mete Başol |
| | (Turkey) Ali Gürsoy |
| | (Turkey) Ahmet Ocaklı |
| | (Turkey) Abdürrahim Albayrak |
| | (Turkey) Emir Sarıgül |
| | (Turkey) Mehmet Cibara |
| | (Turkey) Necati Demirkol |

=== Technical staff ===
| Position | Staff |
|---|---|
| Head Coach | (Turkey) Fatih Terim |
| Assistant Coach | (Turkey) Hasan Şaş |
| Assistant Coach | (Turkey) Ümit Davala |
| Goalkeeper Coach | (Brazil) Cláudio Taffarel |
| Fitness Coach | (United States) Scott Piri |
| Analyst | (Turkey) Metin Çakıroğlu |
| Conditioner | (Turkey) Yasin Küçük |

=== Medical staff ===
| Position | Staff |
|---|---|
| Doctor | (Turkey) Yener İnce |
| Physiotherapist | (Turkey) Mustafa Korkmaz (Turkey) Burak Koca (Turkey) İlhan Er |
| Masseur | (Turkey) Uğur Durul (Turkey) Sedat Peker (Turkey) Erkan Kazancı (Turkey) Serdal Yılmaz |

=== Grounds ===
| Ground (capacity and dimensions) | Türk Telekom Arena (52,652 / 105x68m) |
| Training ground | Florya Metin Oktay Sports Complex and Training Center |

=== Kit ===
Uniform Manufacturer: Nike

Chest Advertising's: Türk Telekom

Back Advertising's: Ülker

Arm Advertising's: Avea

Short Advertising's: Nikon

Home
Away
Third

== Sponsorship ==
Companies that Galatasaray S.K. had sponsorship deals with during the season included the following.

| Licensee | Product |
|---|---|
| Türk Telekom | Main Sponsor |
| Nike | Technical Sponsor |
| Avea | Cosponsor |
| Ülker | Cosponsor |
| Nikon | Cosponsor |
| Opel | Cosponsor |
| Turkish Airlines | Official Sponsor |
| Hedef Filo Hizmetleri | Official Sponsor |
| HDI-Gerling | Official Sponsor |
| Medical Park | Official Sponsor |
| Yandex | Official Sponsor |
| MNG Kargo | Official Sponsor |
| Sarar | Official Sponsor |
| Denizbank | Official Sponsor |
| Diversey | Official Supplier |
| GNC | Official Supplier |

== Season overview ==
Ayhan Akman retired from his professional football career on 13 May 2012, at the age of 35, after winning his fourth and final Süper Lig title with Galatasaray in the previous season. Additionally, the club did not seek to extend the contracts of some players, including Servet Çetin and Aykut Erçetin, and they therefore became free agents.

Galatasaray began the season by commencing their Süper Lig campaign on 4 July 2012, in which they were aiming for a nineteenth league title. Between 6 and 15 July, Galatasaray preceded the rest of their 2012–13 campaign with an Austrian tour. The tour began with matches against two Austrian teams.

== Players ==
=== Squad information ===
| N | Pos. | Nat. | Name | Age | EU | Since | App | Goals | Ends | Transfer fee | Notes |
|---|---|---|---|---|---|---|---|---|---|---|---|
| 4 | MF | (Turkey) | Hamit Altıntop | 43 | EU | 2012 | 40 | 1 | 2016 | €3.5M | |
| 5 | DF | (Turkey) | Gökhan Zan | 44 | Non-EU | 2009 | 55 | 2 | 2014 | Free | |
| 7 | MF | (Turkey) | Aydın Yılmaz | 38 | Non-EU | 2006 | 114 | 7 | 2013 | Youth system | |
| 8 | MF | (Turkey) | Selçuk İnan | 41 | Non-EU | 2011 | 82 | 20 | 2016 | Free | |
| 9 | FW | (Sweden) | Johan Elmander | 45 | EU | 2011 | 61 | 17 | 2014 | Free | |
| 10 | MF | (Brazil) | Felipe Melo | 43 | EU | 2011 | 71 | 13 | 2013 | €1.75M | On loan from Juventus |
| 11 | MF | (Spain) | Albert Riera | 44 | EU | 2011 | 67 | 3 | 2015 | €3M | |
| 12 | FW | (Ivory Coast) | Didier Drogba | 48 | EU | 2013 | 17 | 6 | 2014 | Free | |
| 13 | DF | (Cameroon) | Dany Nounkeu | 40 | Non-EU | 2012 | 34 | 0 | 2016 | €3.3M | |
| 14 | MF | (Netherlands) | Wesley Sneijder | 42 | EU | 2013 | 16 | 4 | 2016 | €7.5M | |
| 17 | FW | (Turkey) | Burak Yılmaz | 41 | Non-EU | 2012 | 39 | 32 | 2016 | €5M | |
| 19 | FW | (Turkey) | Umut Bulut | 43 | Non-EU | 2012 | 38 | 15 | 2013 | €0.35M | On loan from Toulouse |
| 22 | DF | (Turkey) | Hakan Balta | 43 | EU | 2007 | 191 | 9 | 2015 | €1M + Ferhat Öztorun | |
| 23 | MF | (Turkey) | Furkan Özçal | 35 | EU | 2012 | 1 | 0 | 2016 | Free | |
| 25 | GK | (Uruguay) | Fernando Muslera | 40 | EU | 2011 | 83 | 1 | 2016 | €6.75M + Lorik Cana | |
| 26 | DF | (Turkey) | Semih Kaya | 35 | Non-EU | 2008 | 71 | 1 | 2016 | Youth system | |
| 27 | DF | (Ivory Coast) | Emmanuel Eboué | 43 | EU | 2011 | 71 | 4 | 2015 | €3.5M | |
| 30 | DF | (Czech Republic) | Tomáš Ujfaluši (C) | 48 | EU | 2011 | 42 | 1 | 2013 | €2M | |
| 33 | DF | (Turkey) | Çağlar Birinci | 40 | Non-EU | 2010 | 18 | 0 | 2013 | €1.5M | |
| 35 | MF | (Turkey) | Yekta Kurtuluş | 40 | Non-EU | 2011 | 36 | 1 | 2015 | €3.75M | |
| 50 | MF | (Turkey) | Engin Baytar | 43 | EU | 2011 | 46 | 2 | 2013 | €1.1M | |
| 52 | MF | (Turkey) | Emre Çolak | 35 | Non-EU | 2009 | 90 | 8 | 2016 | Youth system | |
| 53 | MF | (Morocco) | Nordin Amrabat | 39 | EU | 2012 | 43 | 1 | 2017 | €8.6M | |
| 55 | MF | (Turkey) | Sabri Sarıoğlu | 42 | Non-EU | 2002 | 259 | 14 | 2015 | Youth system | |
| 67 | GK | (Turkey) | Eray İşcan | 35 | Non-EU | 2011 | 2 | 0 | 2014 | Youth system | |
| 82 | GK | (Turkey) | Aykut Erçetin | 43 | EU | 2003 | 58 | 0 | 2013 | Free | |
| 86 | GK | (Turkey) | Ufuk Ceylan | 40 | Non-EU | 2009 | 30 | 0 | 2014 | €1M + 3 Players | |

- Last updated: 18 May 2013
- Source: Galatasaray.org, Players in / out, Wikipedia players' articles (for appearances and goals in Domestic league, Domestic cup and European Cups) and footballdatabase.com (for EU passport)
- Ordered by Last season starting 11 and position on pitch (from back right to front left).

=== Transfers ===
==== In ====
| No. | Pos. | Nat. | Name | Age | EU | Moving from | Type | Transfer window | Ends | Transfer fee | Source |
|---|---|---|---|---|---|---|---|---|---|---|---|
| 13 | DF | (Cameroon) | Dany Nounkeu | 40 | Non-EU | Gaziantepspor (Turkey) | Transfer | Summer | 2016 | €3.3M | Galatasaray.org |
| 19 | FW | (Turkey) | Umut Bulut | 43 | Non-EU | Toulouse (France) | Loan | Summer | 2013 | €0.40M | Galatasaray.org |
| 4 | MF | (Turkey) | Hamit Altıntop | 43 | EU | Real Madrid (Spain) | Transfer | Summer | 2016 | €3.5M | Galatasaray.org, RealMadrid.com |
| 17 | FW | (Turkey) | Burak Yılmaz | 41 | Non-EU | Trabzonspor | Transfer | Summer | 2016 | €5M | Galatasaray.org |
| 53 | MF | (Morocco) | Nordin Amrabat | 39 | EU | Kayserispor | Transfer | Summer | 2017 | €8.6M | Galatasaray.org |
| 10 | MF | (Brazil) | Felipe Melo | 43 | EU | Juventus (Italy) | Loan | Summer | 2013 | €1.75M | Galatasaray.org |
| 3 | DF | (Brazil) | Cris | 49 | EU | Lyon (France) | Transfer | Summer | 2013 | Free | Galatasaray.org OLweb.fr |
| 23 | MF | (Turkey) | Furkan Özçal | 35 | EU | Kayserispor | Transfer | Summer | 2016 | Free | Galatasaray.org |
| 14 | MF | (Netherlands) | Wesley Sneijder | 42 | EU | Internazionale (Italy) | Transfer | Winter | 2016 | €7.5M | Galatasaray.org, Inter.it |
| 12 | FW | (Ivory Coast) | Didier Drogba | 48 | EU | Shanghai Shenhua (China) | Transfer | Winter | 2014 | Free | Galatasaray.org |
| 82 | GK | (Turkey) | Aykut Erçetin | 43 | EU | | Transfer | Winter | 2013 | Free | Galatasaray.org |

Total spending: ▼€30.050 million

==== Out ====
| No. | Pos. | Nat. | Name | Age | EU | Moving to | Type | Transfer window | Transfer fee | Source |
|---|---|---|---|---|---|---|---|---|---|---|
| 18 | MF | (Turkey) | Ayhan Akman | 49 | Non-EU | | Retired | Summer | Free | |
| 76 | DF | (Turkey) | Servet Çetin | 45 | Non-EU | Eskişehirspor | End of contract | Summer | Free | Eskisehirspor.org |
| 1 | GK | (Turkey) | Aykut Erçetin | 43 | EU | | End of contract | Summer | Free | |
| 28 | FW | (Romania) | Bogdan Stancu | 39 | EU | Orduspor | Transfer | Summer | €2.5M | Galatasaray.org |
| 80 | FW | (Turkey) | Colin Kazim-Richards | 39 | EU | Blackburn Rovers (England) | Loan | Summer | N/A | Galatasaray.org |
| | FW | (Colombia) | Juan Pablo Pino | 39 | EU | Mersin İdman Yurdu (Turkey) | Transfer | Summer | €0.1M | Galatasaray.org |
| 19 | FW | (Turkey) | Mehmet Batdal | 40 | Non-EU | Bucaspor | Loan | Summer | N/A | Galatasaray.org |
| 20 | DF | (Turkey) | Serkan Kurtuluş | 36 | Non-EU | Gençlerbirliği | Transfer | Summer | N/A | NTVSpor.net |
| | GK | (Turkey) | Emirhan Ergün | 36 | Non-EU | Bandırmaspor | Transfer | Summer | N/A | NTVspor.net |
| | FW | (Turkey) | Erhan Şentürk | 37 | Non-EU | Çaykur Rizespor | End of contract | Summer | Free | Caykurrizespor.org.tr |
| | FW | (Turkey) | Serdar Eylik | 36 | Non-EU | Erciyesspor | Loan | Summer | N/A | |
| | MF | (Turkey) | Bilal Özhan | 34 | Non-EU | Kayseri Şekerspor | Loan | Summer | N/A | Kayserisekerspor.org |
| | DF | (Turkey) | Ahmet Kesim | 36 | Non-EU | Aydınspor 1923 | End of contract | Summer | Free | |
| | FW | (Turkey) | Fatih Sercan Ekinci | 36 | Non-EU | Oyak Renaultspor | Contract termination | Summer | N/A | |
| 29 | MF | (Argentina) | Emmanuel Culio | 42 | Non-EU | Mersin İdman Yurdu | Loan | Summer | N/A | Galatasaray.org |
| 77 | FW | (Turkey) | Necati Ateş | 46 | Non-EU | Eskişehirspor | Transfer | Summer | €0.4M | Galatasaray.org |
| 21 | MF | (Turkey) | Yiğit Gökoğlan | 37 | Non-EU | Orduspor | Loan | Summer | €0.275M | Galatasaray.org |
| 3 | DF | (Brazil) | Cris | 49 | EU | Grêmio (Brazil) | Contract termination | Winter | Free | Galatasaray.org |
| 6 | MF | (Turkey) | Ceyhun Gülselam | 38 | EU | Kayserispor | Loan | Winter | €0.2M | NTVSpor.net |
| 90 | FW | (Turkey) | Sercan Yıldırım | 36 | Non-EU | Sivasspor | Loan | Winter | €0.15M | NTVSpor.net |
| 15 | FW | (Czech Republic) | Milan Baroš | 44 | EU | Baník Ostrava (Czech Republic) | Contract termination | Winter | Free | Galatasaray.org |

Total income: ▲€3.625 million

Expenditure: ▼€26.375 million

== Competitions ==
=== Overall ===
| Competition | Started round | Final position / round | First match | Last match |
|---|---|---|---|---|
| Süper Lig | — | 1st | 19 August 2012 | 19 May 2013 |
| Turkish Cup | Fourth round | Fifth round | 27 November 2012 | 11 December 2012 |
| Turkish Super Cup | Final | Winners | 12 August 2012 | |
| UEFA Champions League | Group stage | Quarter-finals | 19 September 2012 | 9 April 2013 |

Source: Competitions

=== Pre-season and friendlies ===
| 11 July 2012 | SV Kirchbichl (Austria) | 0–11 | (Turkey) Galatasaray | Kirchbichl, Austria |
| 18:00 CET | | Report | Ateş 10', 42'; A. Yılmaz 25'; Sarıoğlu 28'; Gülselam 44'; Yıldırım 45'; Çolak 52', 71'; Bulut 64', 69'; Ünsal 72' |

| 21 July 2012 | Galatasaray (Turkey) | 5–0 | (Turkey) Istanbulspor | Istanbul, Turkey |
| 10:00 CET | Birinci 14'; Altıntop; Yıldırım; A. Yılmaz | Report | | Stadium: Florya Metin Oktay Sports Complex and Training Center |

| 27 July 2012 | Galatasaray (Turkey) | 6–1 | (Turkey) Konyaspor | Istanbul, Turkey |
| 17:00 CET | B. Yılmaz 5'; İnan 18'; Bulut 58', 70', 89'; Yıldırım 86' | Report | Dere 77' | Stadium: Florya Metin Oktay Sports Complex and Training Center |

| 1 August 2012 | Olimpija Ljubljana (Slovenia) | 1–1 | (Turkey) Galatasaray | Ljubljana, Slovenia |
| 21:00 CET | Valenčič 49' | Report | Çolak 65' | Stadium: Stožice Stadium |

| 4 August 2012 | Galatasaray (Turkey) | 1–0 | (Italy) Lazio | İzmir, Turkey |
| 21:00 CET | Elmander 16' | Report | | Stadium: İzmir Atatürk Stadium; Attendance: 60,000 |

| 8 August 2012 | Galatasaray (Turkey) | 1–0 | (Italy) Fiorentina | Istanbul, Turkey |
| 21:00 CET | Bulut 48' | Report | | Stadium: Türk Telekom Arena; Attendance: 37,250 |

| 15 August 2012 | Galatasaray (Turkey) | 5–1 | (Turkey) Eyüpspor | Istanbul, Turkey |
| 19:00 CET | A. Yılmaz; Baroš; Melo | Report | | Stadium: Türk Telekom Arena |

| 7 September 2012 | Genoa (Italy) | 0–0 | (Turkey) Galatasaray | Genoa, Italy |
| 22:30 CET | | Report | | Stadium: Stadio Luigi Ferraris |

| 10 September 2012 | Kartalspor (Turkey) | 0–2 | (Turkey) Galatasaray | Istanbul, Turkey |
| 16:00 CET | | Report | Melo 16'; Amrabat 27' | Stadium: Kartal Stadium |

| 12 October 2012 | Galatasaray (Turkey) | 0–2 | (Romania) Petrolul Ploiești | Istanbul, Turkey |
| 14:30 CET | | Report | Younés 12' (pen.), 13' | Stadium: Florya Metin Oktay Sports Complex and Training Center |

| 6 January 2013 | Alanyaspor (Turkey) | 2–6 | (Turkey) Galatasaray | Antalya, Turkey |
| 18:00 CET | Gökçe 23'; Parlayan 39' | Report | B. Yılmaz 32' (pen.); A. Yılmaz 41', 58'; Elmander 57', 68'; Riera 63' | Stadium: Alanya Milli Egemenlik |

| 12 January 2013 | Galatasaray (Turkey) | 0–1 | (Germany) VfR Aalen | Antalya, Turkey |
| 13:30 CET | | Report | Cidimar 86' | Stadium: Mardan Sports Complex |

| 26 March 2013 | Galatasaray (Turkey) | 4–0 | (Turkey) Istanbulspor | Istanbul, Turkey |
| 12:00 CET | Kurtuluş; Özçal; Sarıoğlu; A. Yılmaz | Report | | Stadium: Florya Metin Oktay Sports Complex and Training Center |

=== Turkish Super Cup ===
| 12 August 2012 Final | Galatasaray | 3–2 | Fenerbahçe | Erzurum |
| | Bulut 19', 57'; İnan 90' (pen.) | Report | Alex 45'; Kuyt 66' | Stadium: Erzurum Universiade Arena; Attendance: 25,000; Referee: Cüneyt Çakır |

Source: Competitive Matches

=== Süper Lig ===
==== League table ====
| Pos | Team | Pld | W | D | L | GF | GA | GD | Pts | Qualification or relegation |
|---|---|---|---|---|---|---|---|---|---|---|
| 1 | Galatasaray (C) | 34 | 21 | 8 | 5 | 66 | 35 | +31 | 71 | Qualification for the Champions League group stage |
| 2 | Fenerbahçe | 34 | 18 | 7 | 9 | 56 | 39 | +17 | 61 | Qualification for the Champions League third qualifying round |
| 3 | Beşiktaş | 34 | 16 | 10 | 8 | 63 | 49 | +14 | 58 | Qualification for the Europa League play-off round |
| 4 | Bursaspor | 34 | 14 | 13 | 7 | 52 | 41 | +11 | 55 | Qualification for the Europa League third qualifying round |
| 5 | Kayserispor | 34 | 15 | 7 | 12 | 48 | 45 | +3 | 52 | |

Rules for classification: 1) points; 2) goal difference; 3) number of goals scored.
(C) Champions

==== Results summary ====
| Overall | | | | | | | | Home | | | | | | Away | | | | | |
| Pld | W | D | L | GF | GA | GD | Pts | W | D | L | GF | GA | GD | W | D | L | GF | GA | GD |
|---|---|---|---|---|---|---|---|---|---|---|---|---|---|---|---|---|---|---|---|
| 34 | 21 | 8 | 5 | 66 | 35 | +31 | 71 | 13 | 2 | 2 | 38 | 17 | +21 | 8 | 6 | 3 | 28 | 18 | +10 |

Source: Competitive Matches

==== Results by round ====
| Round | 1 | 2 | 3 | 4 | 5 | 6 | 7 | 8 | 9 | 10 | 11 | 12 | 13 | 14 | 15 | 16 | 17 | 18 | 19 | 20 | 21 | 22 | 23 | 24 | 25 | 26 | 27 | 28 | 29 | 30 | 31 | 32 | 33 | 34 |
|---|---|---|---|---|---|---|---|---|---|---|---|---|---|---|---|---|---|---|---|---|---|---|---|---|---|---|---|---|---|---|---|---|---|---|
| Ground | H | A | H | A | H | A | H | A | H | A | A | H | A | H | A | H | A | A | H | A | H | A | H | A | H | A | H | H | A | H | A | H | A | H |
| Result | W | D | W | W | W | L | D | D | W | W | D | L | W | D | W | W | D | L | W | D | W | W | W | D | L | W | W | W | W | W | W | W | L | W |
| Position | 2 | 5 | 1 | 1 | 1 | 1 | 1 | 1 | 1 | 1 | 1 | 1 | 1 | 1 | 1 | 1 | 1 | 1 | 1 | 1 | 1 | 1 | 1 | 1 | 1 | 1 | 1 | 1 | 1 | 1 | 1 | 1 | 1 | 1 |

Source: Competitive Matches
A = Away; H = Home; W = Win; D = Draw; L = Loss

==== Matches ====
| 20 August 2012 1 | Galatasaray | 2–1 | Kasımpaşa | Istanbul |
| 20:00 CET | Bulut 35', 88' | Report | Eker 68' | Stadium: Türk Telekom Arena; Attendance: 40,149; Referee: Fırat Aydınus |

| 26 August 2012 2 | Beşiktaş | 3–3 | Galatasaray | Istanbul |
| 20:45 CET | Melo 5' (o.g.); Hološko 42', 50' | Report | Elmander 20'; Bulut 44'; İnan 85' (pen.) | Stadium: BJK İnönü Stadium; Attendance: 27,000; Referee: Bülent Yıldırım |

| 2 September 2012 3 | Galatasaray | 3–2 | Bursaspor | Istanbul |
| 19:30 CET | Bulut 24'; Çağıran 71' (o.g.); B. Yılmaz 79' | Report | Çağıran 50'; Erdoğan 85' | Stadium: Türk Telekom Arena; Attendance: 48,563; Referee: Özgür Yankaya |

| 15 September 2012 4 | Antalyaspor | 0–4 | Galatasaray | Antalya |
| 19:30 CET | | Report | Elmander 10'; Amrabat 45'; B. Yılmaz 55'; Bulut 90' | Stadium: Akdeniz University Stadium; Attendance: 5,500; Referee: Yunus Yıldırım |

| 23 September 2012 5 | Galatasaray | 3–0 | Akhisar Belediyespor | Istanbul |
| 19:00 CET | B. Yılmaz 28', 58'; Yıldırım 35' | Report | | Stadium: Türk Telekom Arena; Attendance: 45,611; Referee: Mete Kalkavan |

| 28 September 2012 6 | Orduspor | 2–0 | Galatasaray | Ordu |
| 19:00 CET | Kabze 8'; Stancu 66' | Report | | Stadium: 19 Eylül Stadı; Attendance: 9,500; Referee: Barış Şimşek |

| 6 October 2012 7 | Galatasaray | 1–1 | Eskişehirspor | Istanbul |
| 18:00 CET | B. Yılmaz 59' | Report | Zengin 90' | Stadium: Türk Telekom Arena; Attendance: 36,153; Referee: İlker Meral |

| 19 October 2012 8 | Gençlerbirliği | 3–3 | Galatasaray | Ankara |
| 19:00 CET | Azofeifa 26'; Demir 66'; Durmaz 67' | Report | Bulut 54'; Elmander 58'; Balta 84' | Stadium: Ankara 19 Mayıs Stadium; Attendance: 13,000; Referee: Halis Özkahya |

| 28 October 2012 9 | Galatasaray | 3–0 | Kayserispor | Istanbul |
| 18:00 CET | Bulut 8'; Cris 32'; B. Yılmaz 36' | Report | | Stadium: Türk Telekom Arena; Attendance: 31,409; Referee: Cüneyt Çakır |

| 2 November 2012 10 | İstanbul BB | 1–3 | Galatasaray | Istanbul |
| 19:00 CET | Bahadır 61' | Report | Bulut 11'; İnan 42'; Zayatte 68' (o.g.) | Stadium: Atatürk Olympic Stadium; Attendance: 12,500; Referee: Hüseyin Göçek |

| 11 November 2012 11 | Mersin İdman Yurdu | 1–1 | Galatasaray | Mersin |
| 16:00 CET | Nobre 63' | Report | Bulut 48' | Stadium: Tevfik Sırrı Gür Stadium; Attendance: 9,500; Referee: Mustafa İlker Coşkun |

| 18 November 2012 12 | Galatasaray | 1–3 | Karabükspor | Istanbul |
| 19:00 CET | B. Yılmaz 31' | Report | Özek 21'; Yıldız 33'; Parlak 90' | Stadium: Türk Telekom Arena; Attendance: 32,450; Referee: Tolga Özkalfa |

| 24 November 2012 13 | Elazığspor | 0–1 | Galatasaray | Elazığ |
| 18:00 CET | | Report | Kurtuluş 50' | Stadium: Elazığ Atatürk Stadium; Attendance: 6,404; Referee: Özgür Yankaya |

| 30 November 2012 14 | Galatasaray | 1–1 | Gaziantepspor | Istanbul |
| 19:00 CET | B. Yılmaz 79' | Report | Ibričić 67' | Stadium: Türk Telekom Arena; Attendance: 35,500; Referee: Suat Arslanboğa |

| 8 December 2012 15 | Sivasspor | 1–3 | Galatasaray | Sivas |
| 18:00 CET | Kılıç 19' | Report | Bulut 1', 58'; B. Yılmaz 35' | Stadium: Sivas 4 Eylül Stadium; Attendance: 11,000; Referee: İlker Meral |

| 16 December 2012 16 | Galatasaray | 2–1 | Fenerbahçe | Istanbul |
| 19:00 CET | İrtegün 10' (o.g.); İnan 35' | Report | Kaldırım 24' | Stadium: Türk Telekom Arena; Attendance: 51,311; Referee: Halis Özkahya |

| 23 December 2012 17 | Trabzonspor | 0–0 | Galatasaray | Trabzon |
| 18:00 CET | | Report | | Stadium: Hüseyin Avni Aker Stadium; Attendance: 20,500; Referee: Yunus Yıldırım |

| 18 January 2013 18 | Kasımpaşa | 2–1 | Galatasaray | Istanbul |
| 19:00 CET | Ibričić 28'; Viudez 50' | Report | Elmander 18' | Stadium: Recep Tayyip Erdoğan Stadium; Attendance: 11,500; Referee: Bülent Yıldırım |

| 27 January 2013 19 | Galatasaray | 2–1 | Beşiktaş | Istanbul |
| 18:00 CET | Çolak 3'; Riera 45' | Report | Sivok 46' | Stadium: Türk Telekom Arena; Attendance: 49,547; Referee: Tolga Özkalfa |

| 3 February 2013 20 | Bursaspor | 1–1 | Galatasaray | Bursa |
| 18:00 CET | Pinto 18' | Report | Bulut 29' | Stadium: Bursa Atatürk Stadium; Attendance: 25,508; Referee: Fırat Aydınus |

| 10 February 2013 21 | Galatasaray | 2–0 | Antalyaspor | Istanbul |
| 19:00 CET | B. Yılmaz 8', 62' | Report | | Stadium: Türk Telekom Arena; Attendance: 47,500; Referee: Barış Şimşek |

| 15 February 2013 22 | Akhisar Belediyespor | 1–2 | Galatasaray | Manisa |
| 19:00 CET | Vardar 85' | Report | Drogba 68'; B. Yılmaz 70' | Stadium: Manisa 19 Mayıs Stadium; Attendance: 15,000; Referee: Halis Özkahya |

| 25 February 2013 23 | Galatasaray | 4–2 | Orduspor | Istanbul |
| 19:00 CET | Sneijder 58'; B. Yılmaz 68', 70'; İnan 78' | Report | İnan 15' (o.g.); Stancu 45' (pen.) | Stadium: Türk Telekom Arena; Attendance: 49,872; Referee: Serkan Çınar |

| 2 March 2013 24 | Eskişehirspor | 0–0 | Galatasaray | Eskişehir |
| 18:00 CET | | Report | | Stadium: Eskişehir Atatürk Stadium; Attendance: 15,400; Referee: Bülent Yıldırım |

| 8 March 2013 25 | Galatasaray | 0–1 | Gençlerbirliği | Istanbul |
| 19:00 CET | | Report | Vleminckx 60' | Stadium: Türk Telekom Arena; Attendance: 45,000; Referee: Özgür Yankaya |

| 17 March 2013 26 | Kayserispor | 1–3 | Galatasaray | Kayseri |
| 15:30 CET | Biseswar 90' | Report | Sneijder 3'; B. Yılmaz 22', 38' | Stadium: Kadir Has Stadium; Attendance: 25,500; Referee: Mete Kalkavan |

| 30 March 2013 27 | Galatasaray | 2–0 | İstanbul BB | Istanbul |
| 18:00 CET | B. Yılmaz 23', 35' | Report | | Stadium: Türk Telekom Arena; Attendance: 42,108; Referee: İlker Meral |

| 6 April 2013 28 | Galatasaray | 3–1 | Mersin İdman Yurdu | Istanbul |
| 18:00 CET | Melo 60' (pen.); Drogba 70', 84' | Report | Eşer 3' | Stadium: Türk Telekom Arena; Attendance: 34,250; Referee: Süleyman Abay |

| 13 April 2013 29 | Karabükspor | 0–1 | Galatasaray | Karabük |
| 18:00 CET | | Report | Sneijder 52' | Stadium: Yenişehir Stadium; Attendance: 4,500; Referee: Mustafa Kamil Abitoğlu |

| 21 April 2013 30 | Galatasaray | 3–1 | Elazığspor | Istanbul |
| 19:00 CET | B. Yılmaz 2'; Drogba 20', 26' | Report | Gürler 22' | Stadium: Türk Telekom Arena; Attendance: 42,253; Referee: Bülent Yıldırım |

| 28 April 2013 31 | Gaziantepspor | 0–1 | Galatasaray | Gaziantep |
| 19:00 CET | | Report | B. Yılmaz 62' | Stadium: Gaziantep Kamil Ocak Stadium; Attendance: 14,000; Referee: Halis Özkahya |

| 5 May 2013 32 | Galatasaray | 4–2 | Sivasspor | Istanbul |
| 19:00 CET | İnan 8', 60'; B. Yılmaz 53', 74' | Report | Bekmezci 80'; Özkara 90+1' | Stadium: Türk Telekom Arena; Attendance: 51,793; Referee: Fırat Aydınus |

| 12 May 2013 33 | Fenerbahçe | 2–1 | Galatasaray | Istanbul |
| 19:00 CET | Webó 33', 36' | Report | B. Yılmaz 24' (pen.) | Stadium: Şükrü Saracoğlu Stadium; Attendance: 50,025; Referee: Cüneyt Çakır |

| 18 May 2013 34 | Galatasaray | 2–0 | Trabzonspor | Istanbul |
| 18:05 CET | Riera 34'; B. Yılmaz 52' | Report | | Stadium: Türk Telekom Arena; Attendance: 51,983; Referee: Hüseyin Göçek |

=== Turkish Cup ===
| 27 November 2012 Fourth round | Galatasaray | 4–1 | Balıkesirspor | Istanbul |
| 18:00 CET | Elmander 26'; Yıldırım 41'; A. Yılmaz 61'; Gülselam 70' | | Şen 33' | Stadium: Türk Telekom Arena; Attendance: 5,500; Referee: Mete Kalkavan |

| 11 December 2012 Fifth round | Galatasaray | 1–2 | 1461 Trabzon | Istanbul |
| 18:00 CET | Çolak 76' | | Kaya 31' (pen.); Kokoç 69' | Stadium: Türk Telekom Arena; Attendance: 10,000; Referee: Ali Palabıyık |

=== UEFA Champions League ===
==== Group stage ====
Group H
| Pos | Team | Pld | W | D | L | GF | GA | GD | Pts | Qualification | MUN | GAL | CLJ | BRA |
|---|---|---|---|---|---|---|---|---|---|---|---|---|---|---|
| 1 | (England) Manchester United | 6 | 4 | 0 | 2 | 9 | 6 | +3 | 12 | Advance to knockout phase | — | 1–0 | 0–1 | 3–2 |
| 2 | (Turkey) Galatasaray | 6 | 3 | 1 | 2 | 7 | 6 | +1 | 10 (Note: Head-to-head points: Galatasaray 4, CFR Cluj 1.) | Advance to knockout phase | 1–0 | — | 1–1 | 0–2 |
| 3 | (Romania) CFR Cluj | 6 | 3 | 1 | 2 | 9 | 7 | +2 | 10 | Transfer to Europa League | 1–2 | 1–3 | — | 3–1 |
| 4 | (Portugal) Braga | 6 | 1 | 0 | 5 | 7 | 13 | −6 | 3 | | 1–3 | 1–2 | 0–2 | — |

Source: Soccerway
Notes:

| 19 September 2012 1 | Manchester United (England) | 1–0 | (Turkey) Galatasaray | Manchester, England |
| 20:45 CET | Carrick 7'; Evra (yellow card) 38'; Vidić (yellow card) 61'; Van Persie (yellow card) 81' | Report | Melo (yellow card) 58' | Stadium: Old Trafford; Attendance: 74,653; Referee: Wolfgang Stark (Germany); Man of the Match: Hamit Altıntop |

| 2 October 2012 2 | Galatasaray (Turkey) | 0–2 | (Portugal) Braga | Istanbul, Turkey |
| 20:45 CET | Melo (yellow card) 2'; Nounkeu (yellow card) 41' | Report | Rúben Micael 7'; Alan (yellow card) 31', (goal) 90+4'; Viana (yellow card) 46'; Custódio (yellow card) 90+1' | Stadium: Türk Telekom Arena; Attendance: 46,987; Referee: Tom Harald Hagen (Norway) |

| 23 October 2012 3 | Galatasaray (Turkey) | 1–1 | (Romania) CFR Cluj | Istanbul, Turkey |
| 20:45 CET | Bulut (yellow card) 14'; Amrabat (yellow card) 25'; Melo (yellow card) 31'; Sarıoğlu (yellow card) 73'; B. Yılmaz 76' | Report | Nounkeu 19' (o.g.); Aguirregaray (yellow card) 25' (yellow-red card) 28'; Bastos (yellow card) 37' | Stadium: Türk Telekom Arena; Attendance: 39,025; Referee: Paolo Tagliavento (Italy) |

| 7 November 2012 4 | CFR Cluj (Romania) | 1–3 | (Turkey) Galatasaray | Cluj-Napoca, Romania |
| 20:45 CET | Sougou 53' | Report | B. Yılmaz 18', 61', 74'; Riera (yellow card) 40'; Altıntop (yellow card) 48' | Stadium: Stadionul Dr. Constantin Rădulescu; Attendance: 16,232; Referee: William Collum (Scotland) |

| 20 November 2012 5 | Galatasaray (Turkey) | 1–0 | (England) Manchester United | Istanbul, Turkey |
| 20:45 CET | Kaya (yellow card) 8'; B. Yılmaz 53', (yellow card) 77' | Report | Rafael (yellow card) 20' | Stadium: Türk Telekom Arena; Attendance: 51,278; Referee: Carlos Velasco Carballo (Spain); Man of the Match: Hamit Altıntop |

| 5 December 2012 6 | Braga (Portugal) | 1–2 | (Turkey) Galatasaray | Braga, Portugal |
| 20:45 CET | Salino (yellow card) 49'; Mossoró 32', (yellow card) 85'; Amorim (yellow card) 83' | Report | B. Yılmaz 58', (yellow card) 90+2'; Riera (yellow card) 65'; A. Yılmaz 78'; İnan (yellow card) 85' | Stadium: Estádio Municipal de Braga; Attendance: 8,964; Referee: Nicola Rizzoli (Italy) |

==== Knockout phase ====
===== Round of 16 =====
| 20 February 2013 First leg | Galatasaray (Turkey) | 1–1 | (Germany) Schalke 04 | Istanbul, Turkey |
| 20:45 CET | B. Yılmaz 13'; Muslera (yellow card) 17'; Amrabat (yellow card) 48'; Nounkeu (yellow card) 68'; İnan (yellow card) 90' | Report | Jones (yellow card) 35', (goal) 45'; Kolašinac (yellow card) 78'; Höger (yellow card) 87' | Stadium: Türk Telekom Arena; Attendance: 50,734; Referee: William Collum (Scotland); Man of the Match: Julian Draxler |

| 12 March 2013 Second leg | Schalke 04 (Germany) | 2–3 (3–4 agg.) | (Turkey) Galatasaray | Gelsenkirchen, Germany |
| 20:45 CET | Höger (yellow card) 14'; Neustädter 17'; Bastos 63'; Kolašinac (yellow card) 90+4' | Report | Altıntop 37'; B. Yılmaz 42'; Drogba (yellow card) 85'; Bulut 90+5' | Stadium: Veltins-Arena; Attendance: 54,142; Referee: Jonas Eriksson (Sweden); Man of the Match: Hamit Altıntop |

===== Quarter-finals =====
| 3 April 2013 First leg | Real Madrid (Spain) | 3–0 | (Turkey) Galatasaray | Madrid, Spain |
| 20:45 CEST | Ronaldo 9'; Benzema 29'; Higuaín 73'; Essien (yellow card) 84'; Alonso (yellow card) 84'; Ramos (yellow card) 90'; Modrić (yellow card) 90+2' | Report | Nounkeu (yellow card) 41'; Melo (yellow card) 71'; Drogba (yellow card) 74'; B. Yılmaz (yellow card) 78' | Stadium: Santiago Bernabéu Stadium; Attendance: 76,462; Referee: Svein Oddvar Moen (Norway) |

| 9 April 2013 Second leg | Galatasaray (Turkey) | 3–2 (3–5 agg.) | (Spain) Real Madrid | Istanbul, Turkey |
| 20:45 CEST | Sneijder (yellow card) 20', (goal) 71'; Eboué (yellow card) 45', (goal) 57'; Drogba 72'; Amrabat (yellow card) 90+4' | Report | Ronaldo 8', 90+2'; Arbeloa (yellow card) 89' (yellow-red card) 90' | Stadium: Türk Telekom Arena; Attendance: 49,975; Referee: Stéphane Lannoy (France); Man of the Match: Wesley Sneijder |

== Statistics ==
=== Squad statistics ===
|

| No. | Pos. | Player | League | | Turkish Cup | | Super Cup | | Champions League | | Total | | Discipline | | Minutes |
| No. | Pos. | Player | Apps | Goals | Apps | Goals | Apps | Goals | Apps | Goals | Apps | Goals | Yellow card | Red card | Total |
|---|---|---|---|---|---|---|---|---|---|---|---|---|---|---|---|
| 25 | GK | (Uruguay) Fernando Muslera | 33 | 0 | 0 | 0 | 1 | 0 | 10 | 0 | 44 | 0 | 3 | 1 | 3948 |
| 86 | GK | (Turkey) Ufuk Ceylan | 1 | 0 | 2 | 0 | 0 | 0 | 0 | 0 | 3 | 0 | 0 | 0 | 264 |
| 67 | GK | (Turkey) Eray İşcan | 1 | 0 | 1 | 0 | 0 | 0 | 0 | 0 | 2 | 0 | 0 | 0 | 17 |
| 82 | GK | (Turkey) Aykut Erçetin | 0 | 0 | 0 | 0 | 0 | 0 | 0 | 0 | 0 | 0 | 0 | 0 | 0 |
| 5 | DF | (Turkey) Gökhan Zan | 10 | 0 | 2 | 0 | 0 | 0 | 3 | 0 | 15 | 0 | 2 | 1 | 1135 |
| 13 | DF | (Cameroon) Dany Nounkeu | 24 | 0 | 0 | 0 | 1 | 0 | 9 | 0 | 34 | 0 | 7 | 1 | 3000 |
| 30 | DF | (Czech Republic) Tomáš Ujfaluši | 2 | 0 | 0 | 0 | 0 | 0 | 0 | 0 | 2 | 0 | 0 | 0 | 180 |
| 3 | DF | (Brazil) Cris | 10 | 1 | 1 | 0 | 0 | 0 | 1 | 0 | 12 | 1 | 3 | 0 | 993 |
| 22 | DF | (Turkey) Hakan Balta | 14 | 1 | 1 | 0 | 1 | 0 | 1 | 0 | 17 | 1 | 6 | 0 | 1358 |
| 26 | DF | (Turkey) Semih Kaya | 25 | 0 | 0 | 0 | 1 | 0 | 10 | 0 | 36 | 0 | 5 | 0 | 3094 |
| 27 | DF | (Ivory Coast) Emmanuel Eboué | 28 | 0 | 0 | 0 | 1 | 0 | 10 | 1 | 39 | 1 | 1 | 0 | 3176 |
| 33 | DF | (Turkey) Çağlar Birinci | 1 | 0 | 2 | 0 | 0 | 0 | 0 | 0 | 3 | 0 | 1 | 0 | 198 |
| 4 | MF | (Turkey) Hamit Altıntop | 29 | 0 | 1 | 0 | 1 | 0 | 9 | 1 | 40 | 1 | 8 | 0 | 2957 |
| 6 | MF | (Turkey) Ceyhun Gülselam | 1 | 0 | 2 | 1 | 0 | 0 | 0 | 0 | 3 | 1 | 0 | 0 | 170 |
| 7 | MF | (Turkey) Aydın Yılmaz | 16 | 0 | 2 | 1 | 1 | 0 | 3 | 1 | 22 | 2 | 2 | 0 | 869 |
| 8 | MF | (Turkey) Selçuk İnan | 31 | 6 | 0 | 0 | 1 | 1 | 10 | 0 | 42 | 7 | 11 | 0 | 3771 |
| 10 | MF | (Brazil) Felipe Melo | 26 | 1 | 0 | 0 | 0 | 0 | 9 | 0 | 35 | 1 | 11 | 2 | 2741 |
| 11 | MF | (Spain) Albert Riera | 26 | 1 | 0 | 0 | 0 | 0 | 9 | 0 | 35 | 1 | 7 | 0 | 2871 |
| 52 | MF | (Turkey) Emre Çolak | 24 | 1 | 2 | 1 | 1 | 0 | 6 | 0 | 31 | 2 | 2 | 0 | 1851 |
| 55 | MF | (Turkey) Sabri Sarıoğlu | 16 | 0 | 2 | 0 | 0 | 0 | 4 | 0 | 22 | 0 | 2 | 1 | 1190 |
| 50 | MF | (Turkey) Engin Baytar | 7 | 0 | 2 | 0 | 1 | 0 | 1 | 0 | 11 | 0 | 2 | 1 | 544 |
| 23 | MF | (Turkey) Furkan Özçal | 0 | 0 | 1 | 0 | 0 | 0 | 0 | 0 | 1 | 0 | 0 | 0 | 28 |
| 35 | MF | (Turkey) Yekta Kurtuluş | 18 | 1 | 0 | 0 | 0 | 0 | 2 | 0 | 20 | 1 | 2 | 0 | 1090 |
| 53 | MF | (Morocco) Nordin Amrabat | 30 | 1 | 2 | 0 | 1 | 0 | 10 | 0 | 43 | 1 | 7 | 0 | 2010 |
| 14 | MF | (Netherlands) Wesley Sneijder | 12 | 3 | 0 | 0 | 0 | 0 | 4 | 1 | 16 | 4 | 2 | 0 | 1002 |
| 9 | FW | (Sweden) Johan Elmander | 16 | 4 | 2 | 1 | 1 | 0 | 6 | 0 | 25 | 5 | 1 | 0 | 1255 |
| 90 | FW | (Turkey) Sercan Yıldırım | 3 | 1 | 2 | 1 | 0 | 0 | 0 | 0 | 5 | 2 | 0 | 0 | 192 |
| 17 | FW | (Turkey) Burak Yılmaz | 30 | 24 | 0 | 0 | 0 | 0 | 9 | 8 | 39 | 32 | 5 | 0 | 3176 |
| 19 | FW | (Turkey) Umut Bulut | 27 | 12 | 0 | 0 | 1 | 2 | 10 | 1 | 38 | 15 | 2 | 1 | 1957 |
| 12 | FW | (Ivory Coast) Didier Drogba | 13 | 5 | 0 | 0 | 0 | 0 | 4 | 1 | 17 | 6 | 4 | 0 | 1374 |
| – | – | Own goals | – | 3 | – | 0 | – | 0 | – | 0 | – | 3 | – | – | – |

Statistics accurate as of 18 May 2013

=== Goals ===
Includes all competitive matches.

Last updated on 18 May 2013

| Position | Nation | Number | Player | Süper Lig | Champions League | Turkish Cup | Super Cup | Total |
|---|---|---|---|---|---|---|---|---|
| 1 | (Turkey) | 17 | Burak Yılmaz | 24 | 8 | 0 | 0 | 32 |
| 2 | (Turkey) | 19 | Umut Bulut | 12 | 1 | 0 | 2 | 15 |
| 3 | (Turkey) | 8 | Selçuk İnan | 6 | 0 | 0 | 1 | 7 |
| 4 | (Ivory Coast) | 12 | Didier Drogba | 5 | 1 | 0 | 0 | 6 |
| 5 | (Sweden) | 9 | Johan Elmander | 4 | 0 | 1 | 0 | 5 |
| 6 | (Netherlands) | 14 | Wesley Sneijder | 3 | 1 | 0 | 0 | 4 |
| 7 | (Spain) | 11 | Albert Riera | 2 | 0 | 0 | 0 | 2 |
| 7 | (Turkey) | 52 | Emre Çolak | 1 | 0 | 1 | 0 | 2 |
| 7 | (Turkey) | 90 | Sercan Yıldırım | 1 | 0 | 1 | 0 | 2 |
| 7 | (Turkey) | 7 | Aydın Yılmaz | 0 | 1 | 1 | 0 | 2 |
| 8 | (Turkey) | 4 | Hamit Altıntop | 0 | 1 | 0 | 0 | 1 |
| 8 | (Ivory Coast) | 27 | Emmanuel Eboué | 0 | 1 | 0 | 0 | 1 |
| 8 | (Brazil) | 10 | Felipe Melo | 1 | 0 | 0 | 0 | 1 |
| 8 | (Turkey) | 35 | Yekta Kurtuluş | 1 | 0 | 0 | 0 | 1 |
| 8 | (Morocco) | 53 | Nordin Amrabat | 1 | 0 | 0 | 0 | 1 |
| 8 | (Turkey) | 22 | Hakan Balta | 1 | 0 | 0 | 0 | 1 |
| 8 | (Turkey) | 6 | Ceyhun Gülselam | 0 | 0 | 1 | 0 | 1 |
| 8 | (Brazil) | 3 | Cris | 1 | 0 | 0 | 0 | 1 |
| 8 | | | Own Goals | 3 | 0 | 0 | 0 | 3 |
| | | | TOTALS | 66 | 14 | 5 | 3 | 88 |

=== Assists ===
Includes all competitive matches.

Last updated on 18 May 2013

| Position | Nation | Number | Player | Süper Lig | Champions League | Turkish Cup | Super Cup | Total |
|---|---|---|---|---|---|---|---|---|
| 1 | (Turkey) | 8 | Selçuk İnan | 6 | 5 | 0 | 2 | 13 |
| 2 | (Morocco) | 53 | Nordin Amrabat | 8 | 2 | 0 | 0 | 10 |
| 3 | (Turkey) | 17 | Burak Yılmaz | 8 | 0 | 0 | 0 | 8 |
| 3 | (Turkey) | 4 | Hamit Altıntop | 6 | 2 | 0 | 0 | 8 |
| 4 | (Ivory Coast) | 12 | Didier Drogba | 7 | 0 | 0 | 0 | 7 |
| 5 | (Brazil) | 10 | Felipe Melo | 5 | 1 | 0 | 0 | 6 |
| 5 | (Turkey) | 19 | Umut Bulut | 5 | 0 | 0 | 1 | 6 |
| 6 | (Turkey) | 52 | Emre Çolak | 5 | 0 | 0 | 0 | 5 |
| 6 | (Ivory Coast) | 27 | Emmanuel Eboué | 5 | 0 | 0 | 0 | 5 |
| 7 | (Spain) | 11 | Albert Riera | 2 | 1 | 0 | 0 | 3 |
| 8 | (Turkey) | 35 | Yekta Kurtuluş | 2 | 0 | 0 | 0 | 2 |
| 8 | (Turkey) | 55 | Sabri Sarıoğlu | 1 | 1 | 0 | 0 | 2 |
| 8 | (Turkey) | 7 | Aydın Yılmaz | 0 | 0 | 2 | 0 | 2 |
| 8 | (Turkey) | 90 | Sercan Yıldırım | 0 | 0 | 2 | 0 | 2 |
9
| 9 | (Netherlands) | 14 | Wesley Sneijder | 0 | 1 | 0 | 0 | 1 |
| 9 | (Turkey) | 22 | Hakan Balta | 1 | 0 | 0 | 0 | 1 |
| 9 | (Sweden) | 9 | Johan Elmander | 1 | 0 | 0 | 0 | 1 |
| 9 | (Turkey) | 26 | Semih Kaya | 1 | 0 | 0 | 0 | 1 |
| 9 | (Brazil) | 3 | Cris | 0 | 0 | 1 | 0 | 1 |
| 9 | | | Own Goals | 3 | 0 | 0 | 0 | 3 |
| | | | TOTALS | 66 | 14 | 5 | 3 | 88 |

=== Disciplinary record ===
| N | Pos. | Nat. | Name | Yellow card | Second yellow card | Red card | Notes |
|---|---|---|---|---|---|---|---|
| 25 | GK | (Uruguay) | Fernando Muslera | 3 | | 1 | |
| 86 | GK | (Turkey) | Ufuk Ceylan | | | | |
| 67 | GK | (Turkey) | Eray İşcan | | | | |
| 82 | GK | (Turkey) | Aykut Erçetin | | | | |
| 33 | DF | (Turkey) | Çağlar Birinci | 1 | | | |
| 5 | DF | (Turkey) | Gökhan Zan | 3 | | 1 | |
| 13 | DF | (Cameroon) | Dany Nounkeu | 7 | | 1 | |
| 3 | DF | (Brazil) | Cris | 3 | | | |
| 30 | DF | (Czech Republic) | Tomáš Ujfaluši | | | | |
| 22 | DF | (Turkey) | Hakan Balta | 6 | | | |
| 26 | DF | (Turkey) | Semih Kaya | 5 | | | |
| 27 | DF | (Ivory Coast) | Emmanuel Eboué | 1 | | | |
| 4 | MF | (Turkey) | Hamit Altıntop | 8 | | | |
| 6 | MF | (Turkey) | Ceyhun Gülselam | | | | |
| 7 | MF | (Turkey) | Aydın Yılmaz | 1 | | | |
| 8 | MF | (Turkey) | Selçuk İnan | 11 | | | |
| 10 | MF | (Brazil) | Felipe Melo | 9 | 1 | 1 | |
| 11 | MF | (Spain) | Albert Riera | 6 | | | |
| 14 | MF | (Netherlands) | Wesley Sneijder | 2 | | | |
| 35 | MF | (Turkey) | Yekta Kurtuluş | 2 | | | |
| 50 | MF | (Turkey) | Engin Baytar | 2 | | 1 | |
| 52 | MF | (Turkey) | Emre Çolak | 2 | | | |
| 55 | MF | (Turkey) | Sabri Sarıoğlu | 2 | | 1 | |
| 53 | MF | (Morocco) | Nordin Amrabat | 8 | | | |
| 19 | FW | (Turkey) | Umut Bulut | 3 | 1 | 1 | |
| 17 | FW | (Turkey) | Burak Yılmaz | 5 | | | |
| 9 | FW | (Sweden) | Johan Elmander | 1 | | | |
| 90 | FW | (Turkey) | Sercan Yıldırım | | | | |
| 12 | FW | (Ivory Coast) | Didier Drogba | 4 | | | |

Last updated: 18 May 2013
Source: http://www.ntvspor.net/istatistik
Only competitive matches
(yellow card) = Number of bookings; (second yellow card) = Number of sending offs after a second yellow card; (red card) = Number of sending offs by a direct red card.

=== Overall ===
| | Total | Home | Away | Neutral |
|---|---|---|---|---|
| Games played | 47 | 24 | 22 | 1 |
| Games won | 28 | 16 | 11 | 1 |
| Games drawn | 10 | 4 | 6 | 0 |
| Games lost | 9 | 4 | 5 | 0 |
| Biggest win | 4–0 vs Antalyaspor | 3–0 vs Akhisar Belediyespor; 3–0 vs Kayserispor | 4–0 vs Antalyaspor | 3–2 vs Fenerbahçe |
| Biggest loss | 3–0 vs Real Madrid | 3–1 vs Karabükspor | 3–0 vs Real Madrid | - |
| Biggest win (League) | 4–0 vs Antalyaspor | 3–0 vs Akhisar Belediyespor; 3–0 vs Kayserispor | 4–0 vs Antalyaspor | - |
| Biggest win (Cup) | 4–1 vs Balıkesirspor | 4–1 vs Balıkesirspor | – | - |
| Biggest win (UEFA) | 3–1 vs CFR Cluj | 3–1 vs CFR Cluj | 3–1 vs CFR Cluj | - |
| Biggest win (Super Cup) | 3–2 vs Fenerbahçe | – | – | 3–2 vs Fenerbahçe |
| Biggest loss (League) | 3–1 vs Karabükspor | 3–1 vs Karabükspor | 2–0 vs Orduspor | - |
| Biggest loss (Cup) | 2–1 vs 1461 Trabzon | 2–1 vs 1461 Trabzon | – | - |
| Biggest loss (UEFA) | 3–0 vs Real Madrid | 2–0 vs Braga | 3–0 vs Real Madrid | - |
| Biggest loss (Super Cup) | – | – | – | - |
| Clean sheets | 12 | 6 | 6 | 0 |
| Goals scored | 88 | 49 | 36 | 3 |
| Goals conceded | 54 | 26 | 26 | 2 |
| Goal difference | +34 | +23 | +10 | +1 |
| Average GF per game | 1.87 | 2.04 | 1.64 | 3 |
| Average GA per game | 1.13 | 1.08 | 1.18 | 2 |
| Yellow cards | 97 | – | | |
| Red cards | 8 | – | | |
| Most appearances | (Uruguay) Fernando Muslera (44) | – | | |
| Most minutes played | (Uruguay) Fernando Muslera (3948) | – | | |
| Most goals | (Turkey) Burak Yılmaz (32) | – | | |
| Most assists | (Turkey) Selçuk İnan (13) | – | | |
| Points | 94 | 52 | 39 | 3 |
| Winning rate | 59.57% | 66.67% | 50% | 100% |

=== Attendance ===
| Competition | Avg. Att. | Total Att. |
|---|---|---|
| Süper Lig | 43,262 | 735,452 |
| Turkish Cup | 7,750 | 15,500 |
| Champions League | 48,018 | 240,068 |
| Total | 41,293 | 999,020 |

- Sold season tickets: 47,200

== See also ==
- 2012 Turkish Super Cup
- 2012–13 Süper Lig
- 2012–13 Turkish Cup
- 2012–13 UEFA Champions League
