= 2010 Turkish Cup final =

- Event: 2009–10 Turkish Cup
Trabzonspor	Fenerbahçe
3	1
- Date: 5 May 2010
- Venue: Şanlıurfa GAP Stadium, Şanlıurfa
- Man of the Match: Engin Baytar
- Referee: Cüneyt Çakır
- Attendance: 28,000
- Weather: Sunny

The 2010 Turkish Cup final took place in Şanlıurfa on 5 May 2010. It was the 48th season of the Turkish Cup. Trabzonspor won the match 3–1 against Fenerbahçe.

== Match details ==
5 May 2010
15:45

Fenerbahçe	1 – 3	Trabzonspor
Alex 55'		66' Umut; 80' Engin; 90+4' Colman

Şanlıurfa GAP Stadium, Şanlıurfa
Referee: Cüneyt Çakır

Fenerbahçe
Trabzonspor

Fenerbahçe:
GK	1	(Turkey) Volkan Demirel
CB	2	(Uruguay) Diego Lugano
CB	58	(Brazil) Fabio Bilica	(yellow card) 71'
RB	77	(Turkey) Gökhan Gönül		(substituted off) 87'
LB	6	(Turkey) Gökçek Vederson
DM	5	(Turkey) Emre Belözoğlu	(yellow card) 38'	(substituted off) 68'
DM	66	(Turkey) Mehmet Topuz
RM	10	(Brazil) Alex (C)
LM	20	(Turkey) Özer Hurmacı
AM	21	(Turkey) Selçuk Şahin
CF	9	(Spain) Daniel Güiza
Substitutes:
GK	88	(Turkey) Volkan Babacan
DF	15	(Turkey) Bekir İrtegün
DF	19	(Turkey) Önder Turacı
DF	24	(Turkey) Deniz Barış
FW	23	(Turkey) Semih Şentürk
FW	39	(Turkey) Gökhan Ünal		(substituted on) 87'
FW	99	(Brazil) Deivid de Souza		(substituted on) 68'
Manager:
(Germany) Christoph Daum

Trabzonspor:
GK	35	(Turkey) Onur Kıvrak	(yellow card) 91'
RB	30	(Turkey) Serkan Balcı	(yellow card) 59'
CB	16	(Turkey) Egemen Korkmaz	(yellow card) 87'
CB	4	(Cameroon) Rigobert Song (C)
LB	3	(Croatia) Hrvoje Čale
LM	17	(Turkey) Burak Yılmaz	(yellow card) 85'
CM	5	(Turkey) Engin Baytar		(substituted off) 86'
CM	8	(Turkey) Selçuk İnan		(substituted off) 83'
RM	20	(Argentina) Gustavo Colman
CF	25	(Brazil) Alanzinho		(substituted off) 91'
CF	10	(Turkey) Umut Bulut
Substitutes:
GK	29	(Turkey) Tolga Zengin
DF	27	(Turkey) Sezer Badur		(substituted on) 83'
DF	11	(Turkey) Barış Memiş
MF	90	(Colombia) Teófilo Gutiérrez
MF	23	(Turkey) Giray Kaçar		(substituted on) 91'
MF	6	(Turkey) Ceyhun Gülselam		(substituted on) 86'
MF	33	(Croatia) Drago Gabrić
Manager:
(Turkey) Şenol Güneş

Man of the match:
Engin Baytar (Trabzonspor)
Referee:
(Turkey) Cüneyt Çakır
Assistant referees:
(Turkey) Bahattin Duran
(Turkey) Tarık Ongun
Fourth referee:
(Turkey) Halis Özkahya

== See also ==
- 2009–10 Turkish Cup
- 2009–10 Süper Lig
