= 2009–10 Turkish Cup =

2009–10 Türkiye Kupası
Ziraat Türkiye Kupası
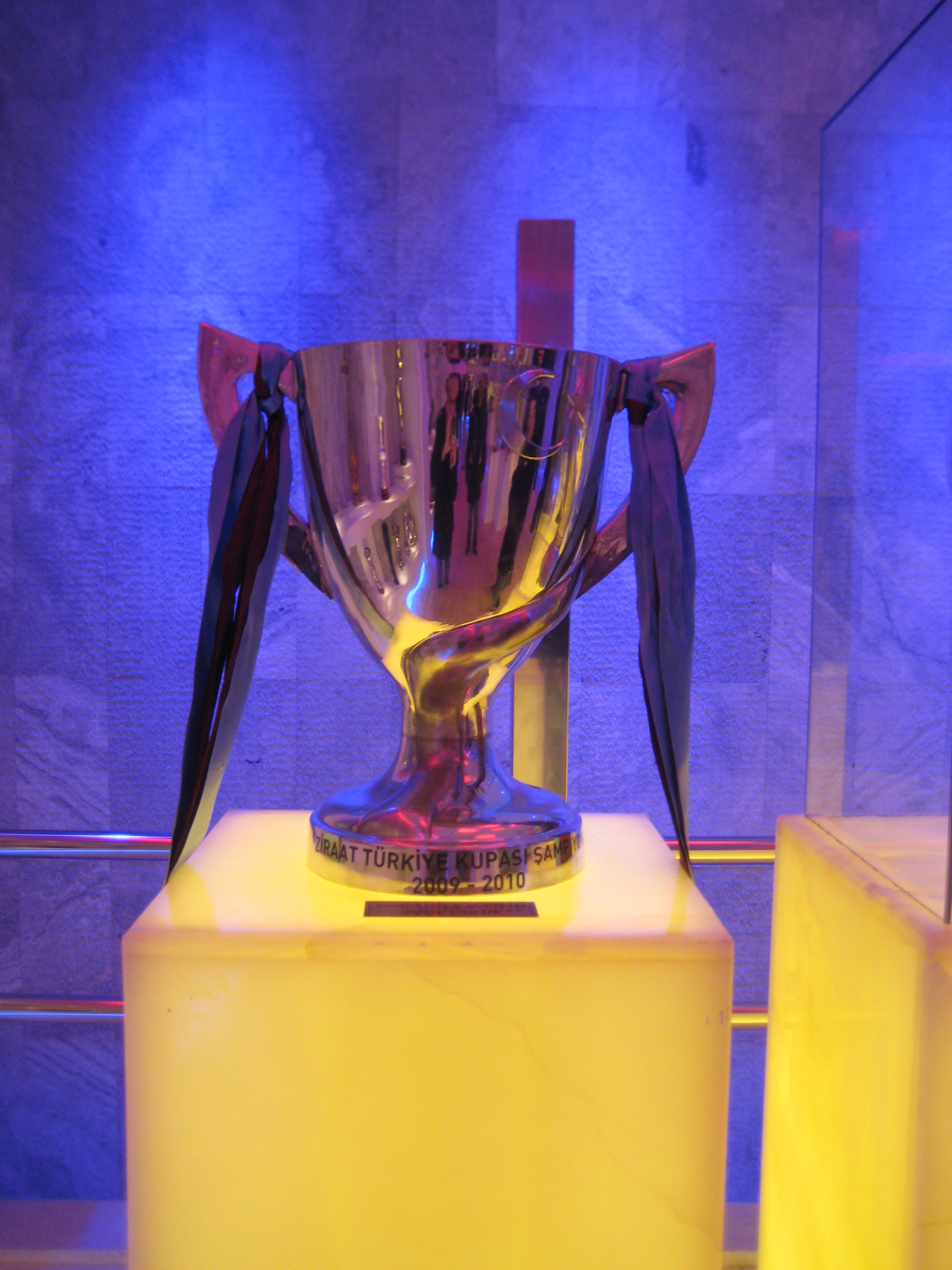
- Picture of the trophy, won by Trabzonspor.

Tournament details
- Country: Turkey
- Dates: 2 September 2009 – 5 May 2010
- Teams: 71

Final positions
- Champions: Trabzonspor
- Runners-up: Fenerbahçe
- UEFA Europa League: Trabzonspor

Tournament statistics
- Matches played: 105
- Top goal scorer(s): (Turkey) Arif Çoban (Tokatspor) (Turkey) Umut Bulut (Trabzonspor) (7 goals each)

The 2009–10 Turkish Cup, also known due to sponsorship reasons as the Ziraat Türkiye Kupası, was the 48th edition of the annual tournament that determined the association football Süper Lig Turkish Cup (Turkish: Türkiye Kupası) champion under the auspices of the Turkish Football Federation (Turkish: Türkiye Futbol Federasyonu; TFF). Seven-time defenders Trabzonspor successfully contested the four time defending champions, Istanbul-based Fenerbahçe in the final, 3-1 The competition began on 2 September 2009 with the first round and concluded on 5 May 2010 with the final, held at Şanlıurfa GAP Stadium. This tournament was conducted under the UEFA Cup system having replaced at the 44th edition a standard knockout competition scheme.

Trabzonspor advanced to the play-off round of the 2010–11 UEFA Europa League. Beşiktaş were the defending champions.

== Teams ==
Round	Clubs remaining	Clubs involved	Winners from previous round	New entries this round	Leagues entering at this round
First Round	71	35	none	35	Levels 3 and 4 in football league pyramid
Second Round	54	36	18	18	Clubs unable to earn promotion from the 1.Lig (Second tier) and the three relegated clubs from the top-flight.
Play-off Round	34	32	18	14	Clubs promoted to the top-flight and clubs who finished 5th-15th in the top-flight.
Group Stages	20	20	16	4	The four seeded clubs (defending champions and clubs place 1st-3rd in the top-flight. If the defending champions have also been seeded because of their league placement, their seed goes to the runners-up.
Quarter-Finals	8	8	8	none	none
Semi-Finals	4	4	4	none	none
Final	2	2	2	none	none

== First round ==
The draw for the First Round took place at the headquarters of the TFF in Istanbul on 25 August 2009. The matches were played on 2 September 2009.

Team 1	Score	Team 2
Lüleburgazspor	1–2	İnegölspor
Beykoz 1908	4–1 pen	Tepecikspor
Eyüpspor	2–1	Gebzespor
Yalovaspor	4–3	Körfez Belediyespor
Denizli Belediyespor	3–1	İzmirspor
TKİ Tavşanlı Linyitspor	0–2	Çanakkale Dardanelspor
Balıkesirspor	0–5	Turgutluspor
Bucaspor	1–0	Göztepe
Ankara Demirspor	0–3	Konya Şekerspor
Tokatspor	4–1	Çankırı Belediyespor
Kırşehirspor	0–2 aet	Pursaklarspor
Çorumspor	5–6 pen	Trabzon Karadenizspor
Kastamonuspor	3–1	Bafra Belediyespor
Belediye Vanspor	3–1	Kahramanmaraşspor
Hatayspor	2–4	Mersin İdmanyurdu
Batman Belediyespor	0–5	Şanlıurfaspor
Diyarbakır Bld. Diskispor	1–2	Adıyamanspor

== Second round ==
The draw for the Second Round was conducted at the headquarters of the TFF in Istanbul on 15 September 2009. The matches were played on 30 September 2009.

Team 1	Score	Team 2
Turgutluspor	1–2	Konya Şekerspor
Tokatspor	3–1	Kocaelispor
Adıyamanspor	1–1 4–5 (p)	Yalovaspor
Belediye Vanspor	1–1 (2–1 aet)	Şanlıurfaspor
Denizli Belediyespor	4–1	Trabzon Karadenizspor
Güngören Belediyespor	1–1 3–1 (aet)	Beykoz 1908
Adanaspor	2–1	Çanakkale Dardanelspor
Kastamonuspor	4–2	Boluspor
Samsunspor	2–0	Karabükspor
Bucaspor	4–2	Sakaryaspor
Kartalspor	1–2	Karşıyaka
Eyüpspor	1–2	Mersin İdmanyurdu
Gaziantep BB	1–3	Tarsus İdmanyurdu
Giresunspor	2–1	Hacettepe
Çaykur Rizespor	6–0	Malatyaspor
Orduspor	2–1	Pursaklarspor
Konyaspor	1–3	Altay
İnegölspor	0–2	Erciyesspor

== Play-off round ==
The draw for the Third Round was conducted at the headquarters of the TFF in Istanbul on 19 October 2009. The matches were played starting on 28 October 2009.

Team 1	Score	Team 2
Tokatspor	3–2	Ankaraspor
Ankaragücü	3–2	Karşıyaka
Kayserispor	0–0 (2–4 p)	Manisaspor
Mersin İdmanyurdu	2–2 (6–7 p)	Antalyaspor
Güngören Belediyespor	0–1	Bursaspor
İstanbul BŞB	0–0 1–1 (aet) (4–2 p)	Gençlerbirliği
Galatasaray	2–1	Bucaspor
Diyarbakırspor	0–1	Tarsus İdmanyurdu
Kasımpaşa	4–1	Kayseri Erciyesspor
Denizli Bld.	2–1	Kastamonuspor
Denizlispor	0–0 4–1 (aet)	Gaziantepspor
Konya Şekerspor	3–2	Adanaspor
Orduspor	1–0	Belediye Vanspor
Giresunspor	2–1 aet	Çaykur Rizespor
Altay	4–0	Samsunspor
Yalovaspor	1–1 1–3 (aet)	Eskişehirspor

== Group stage ==
The group stage consisted of four groups with five teams each. The top four teams that finished from 1st place to 4th in the 2008–09 Süper Lig were seeded as group heads: Beşiktaş, Sivasspor, Trabzonspor and Fenerbahçe. The sixteen teams who qualified through the first two rounds of elimination matches were randomly drawn into one of the four groups.

Every team played every other team of its group once, either home or away. The winners and runners-up of each group qualified for the quarterfinals.

=== Group A ===
Pos	Team	Pld	W	D	L	GF	GA	GD	Pts	FEN	ANT	TOK	ALT	ESK
1	Fenerbahçe	4	3	0	1	10	6	+4	9			3–2	3–0	
2	Antalyaspor	4	2	2	0	6	4	+2	8	4–3				1–0
3	Tokatspor	4	1	1	2	6	7	−1	4		1–1		1–2	
4	Altay	4	1	1	2	2	9	−7	4		0–0			0–5
5	Eskişehirspor	4	1	0	3	6	4	+2	3	0–1		1–2		

Source: tff.org (in Turkish)
Legend: Blue = home team win; Yellow = draw; Red = away team win.
Rules for classification: 1) points; 2) goal difference; 3) number of goals scored.

=== Group B ===
Pos	Team	Pld	W	D	L	GF	GA	GD	Pts	GAL	TRA	ANK	ORD	DBS
1	Galatasaray	4	3	1	0	10	2	+8	10		2–1			5–1
2	Trabzonspor	4	3	0	1	11	3	+8	9				2–1	6–0
3	Ankaragücü	4	2	1	1	4	3	+1	7	0–0	0–2			
4	Orduspor	4	1	0	3	4	8	−4	3	0–3		1–2		
5	Denizli B.S.K.	4	0	0	4	2	15	−13	0			0–2	1–2	

Source: tff.org (in Turkish)
Legend: Blue = home team win; Yellow = draw; Red = away team win.
Rules for classification: 1) points; 2) goal difference; 3) number of goals scored.

=== Group C ===
Pos	Team	Pld	W	D	L	GF	GA	GD	Pts	BUR	DEN	SİV	GIR	TIY
1	Bursaspor	4	3	1	0	9	3	+6	10			4–0		2–1
2	Denizlispor	4	2	2	0	4	2	+2	8	1–1		0–0		
3	Sivasspor	4	2	1	1	5	7	−2	7				4–3	1–0
4	Giresunspor	4	1	0	3	6	8	−2	3	1–2	0–1			
5	Tarsus Idman Yurdu	4	0	0	4	3	7	−4	0		1–2		1–2	

Source: tff.org (in Turkish)
Legend: Blue = home team win; Yellow = draw; Red = away team win.
Rules for classification: 1) points; 2) goal difference; 3) number of goals scored.

=== Group D ===
Pos	Team	Pld	W	D	L	GF	GA	GD	Pts	İBB	MAN	KSM	BEŞ	KON
1	İstanbul B.B.	4	3	1	0	4	0	+4	10				1–0	1–0
2	Manisaspor	4	2	2	0	4	2	+2	8	0–0			2–1	
3	Kasımpaşa	4	1	1	2	5	6	−1	4	0–2	1–1			
4	Beşiktaş	4	1	0	3	6	8	−2	3			1–3		4–2
5	Konya Şekerspor	4	1	0	3	4	7	−3	3		0–1	2–1		

Source: tff.org (in Turkish)
Legend: Blue = home team win; Yellow = draw; Red = away team win.
Rules for classification: 1) points; 2) goal difference; 3) number of goals scored.

== Bracket ==
Quarterfinals
1	Fenerbahçe	3	1	4
8	Bursaspor	0	3	3
4	Manisaspor	4	1	5
5	Denizlispor	1	0	1
2	Antalyaspor	2	2	4
7	Galatasaray	1	3	4
3	İstanbul B.B.	1	0	1
6	Trabzonspor	1	1	2

Semifinals
Fenerbahçe	2	1	3
Manisaspor	0	1	1
Antalyaspor	0	1	1
Trabzonspor	2	0	2

Finals
Fenerbahçe
Trabzonspor

== Quarter-finals ==
In this round the winners and runners-up of all of the previous round's groups were entered. The draw was conducted at the headquarters of the TFF in Istanbul on 27 January 2010 at 11:00 local time. The teams competed in two-leg playoffs with the first leg occurring on 3 February and the second on 10 February 2010.

The following teams qualified for the Turkish Cup Quarterfinal:

Team 1	Agg.	Team 2	1st leg	2nd leg
Fenerbahçe	4–3	Bursaspor	3–0	1–3
Manisaspor	5–1	Denizlispor	4–1	1–0
Antalyaspor	4–4	Galatasaray	2–1	2–3
İstanbul B.B.	1–2	Trabzonspor	1–1	0–1

== Semi-finals ==
The two legs were played on 24 March and 14 April 2010, respectively.

=== Summary table ===
Team 1	Agg.	Team 2	1st leg	2nd leg
Fenerbahçe	3–1	Manisaspor	2–0	1–1
Trabzonspor	2–1	Antalyaspor	2–0	0–1

=== 1st leg ===
24 March 2010 Semi-final	Fenerbahçe	2–0	Manisaspor	Istanbul
20:00 EET (UTC+02)	Güiza 31'; Deivid 34'			Stadium: Şükrü Saracoğlu Stadium; Referee: Abdullah Yılmaz

25 March 2010 Semi-final	Trabzonspor	2–0	Antalyaspor	Trabzon
20:00 EET (UTC+02)	Alanzinho 66'; Umut 87'			Stadium: Hüseyin Avni Aker Stadium; Referee: Hüseyin Göçek

=== 2nd leg ===
13 April 2010 Semi-final	Manisaspor	1–1	Fenerbahçe	Manisa
20:00 EEST (UTC+03)	Güven Varol 15'		Alex 64'	Stadium: Manisa 19 Mayıs Stadium; Referee: Aytekin Durmaz

14 April 2010 Semi-final	Antalyaspor	1–0	Trabzonspor	Antalya
20:00 EEST (UTC+03)	Djiehoua 43'			Stadium: Antalya Atatürk Stadium; Referee: Yunus Yıldırım

== Final ==
The final was won by Trabzonspor.

5 May 2010 Final	Fenerbahçe	1–3	Trabzonspor	Şanlıurfa, Turkey
15:45 EEST (UTC+03)	Alex 55'		Umut 66'; Engin 80'; Colman 90+4'	Stadium: Şanlıurfa GAP Stadium; Attendance: 28,000; Referee: Cüneyt Çakır; Man of the Match: Engin Baytar
