= Selçuk İnan =

Turkish footballer and manager (born 1985)

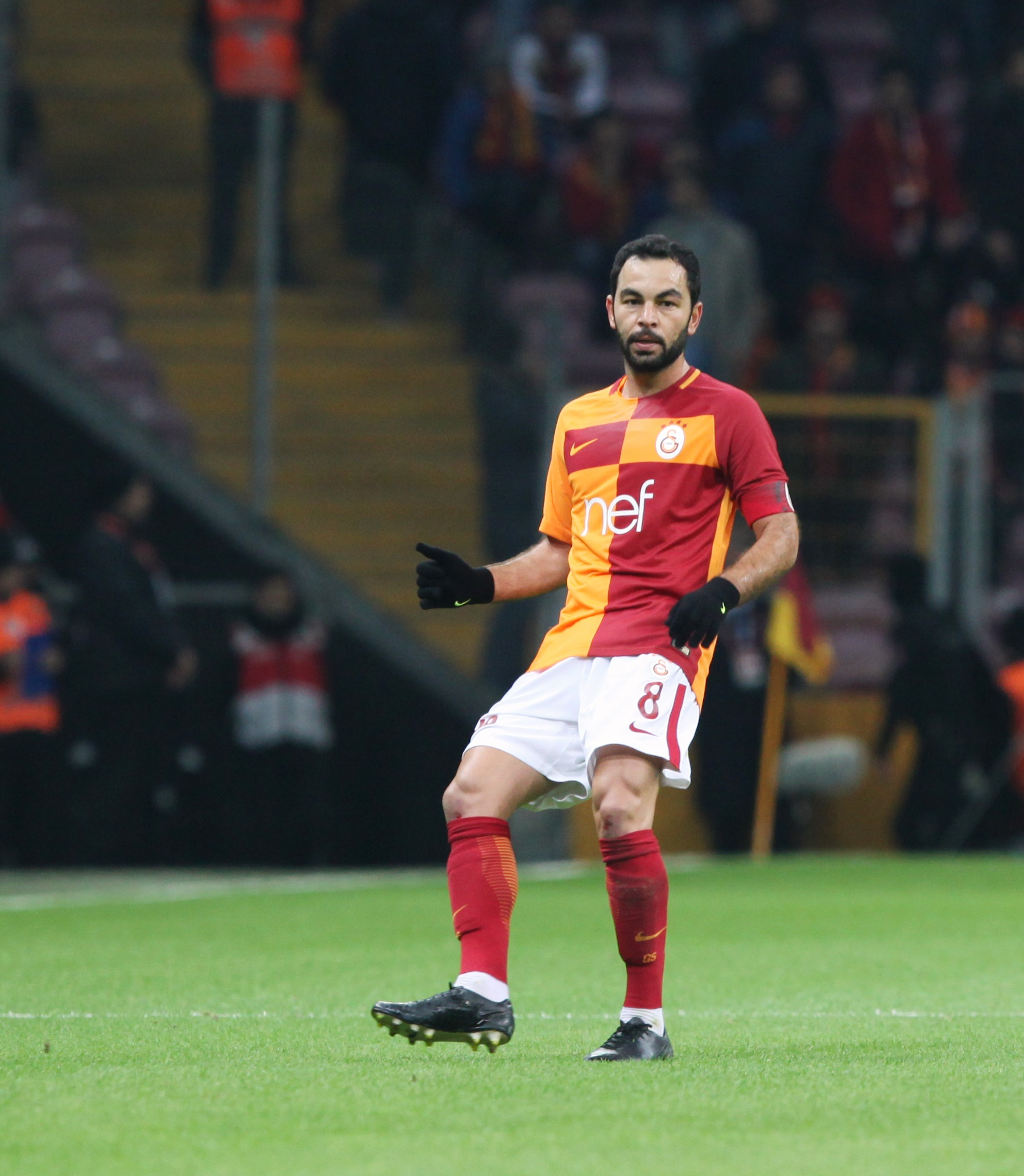
- İnan with Galatasaray

Personal information
- Full name: Selçuk İnan
- Date of birth: 10 February 1985 (age 41)
- Place of birth: İskenderun, Turkey
- Height: 1.82 m (6 ft 0 in)
- Position: Midfielder

Team information
- Current team: Kocaelispor (head coach)

Youth career
- 1999–2000: Karaağaçspor
- 2000–2002: Dardanelspor

Senior career*
Years	Team	Apps	(Gls)
2002–2005	Dardanelspor	76	(6)
2005–2008	Manisaspor	75	(11)
2008–2011	Trabzonspor	93	(7)
2011–2020	Galatasaray	244	(45)
Total		488	(69)

International career
2001–2002	Turkey U17	8	(2)
2002	Turkey U18	5	(1)
2002–2004	Turkey U19	14	(5)
2004	Turkey U20	9	(1)
2005–2007	Turkey U21	10	(3)
2007–2017	Turkey	61	(8)

Managerial career
- 2020–2022: Galatasaray (assistant coach)
- 2022–2023: Kasımpaşa
- 2024–2025: Gaziantep
- 2025–: Kocaelispor
Medal record
Representing Turkey
Men's football
UEFA European Under-19 Championship
Runner-up	2004 Switzerland
- * Club domestic league appearances and goals

Selçuk İnan (Turkish pronunciation: [selt͡ʃuk iˈnan] born 10 February 1985) is a Turkish professional football manager and former player who played as a midfielder.

He began his career with Dardanelspor before playing for Manisaspor and rising to prominence at Trabzonspor. In 2011, he joined Galatasaray, where he became a key figure over nine seasons, winning four Süper Lig titles, three Turkish Cups, and five Turkish Super Cups, while serving as team captain for several years. Internationally, İnan earned over 60 caps for the Turkey national team and was instrumental in helping Turkey qualify for UEFA Euro 2016 with a decisive free-kick goal against Iceland. Following his retirement from playing in 2020, İnan served as assistant manager at Galatasaray under Fatih Terim between 2020 and 2022. He then began his managerial career as head coach, taking charge of Kasımpaşa and Gaziantep, and is currently the manager of Kocaelispor.

== Club career ==
=== Early career ===
İnan was born in Iskenderun on 10 February 1985. By the age of 14, he was spotted by scouting agents and immediately signed by one of the local clubs, Karaağaçspor. His multidimensional style of play and unique footballing mind were soon noticed by Dardanel Spor. At professional level, İnan scored his first goal in a league match against Antalyaspor on 1 December 2002, when he was only 17.

İnan began his professional career as a 14-year-old with Karaağaçspor before signing for Dardanelspor in 2000. He played there until his move to Manisaspor in 2005, where he spent three seasons. In 2008, İnan signed for Trabzonspor under the management of Ersun Yanal, who had previously coached him at Manisaspor. He scored twice against Ankaraspor in his first Süper Lig match with Trabzonspor and later netted the club’s 2,000th league goal in a match against İstanbul BB on 1 November 2008. İnan established a prolific partnership with strikers Umut Bulut and Burak Yılmaz (his former teammate at Manisaspor). During İnan’s tenure, Trabzonspor enjoyed its most successful two seasons of the decade, notably finishing as runners-up in the 2010–11 Süper Lig season.

=== Galatasaray ===
==== 2011–13: Early Galatasaray years ====
İnan agreed to a five-year deal on a free transfer with Galatasaray on 25 May 2011. He quickly took over the Galatasaray midfield from the day he set foot in Türk Telekom Arena. Partnering up with Brazilian midfielder Felipe Melo, İnan began to manifest his exceptional skills which helped Galatasaray to gain a higher level of offensive and defensive state of play. İnan, being a fan favourite at Galatasaray, received the a nickname called "Xelçuk", a play on words after Spanish midfielder Xavi.

In the 2010–11 Süper Lig season, Galatasaray finished eighth in the league table with 14 wins, 4 draws and 16 losses, its worst season in the club's history of 107 years. Right after the last game of the season, the club announced a council meeting in order to elect a new board of directors. During his first month, the fledgling Galatasaray chairman Ünal Aysal's first task was to bring in İnan to the team. Although the previous Galatasaray board which was run by Adnan Polat already had an agreement with Trabzonspor in the Selçuk İnan case during the 2010–11 season, it was the new board that brought in the player for free as İnan's contract with Trabzonspor was over.

After the first four games of the new season, Galatasaray had two wins, one draw and one loss, which did not seem highly promising to the fans, although there was a remarkable sense of change in the team, especially in the midfield area.

İnan started to lead the team as weeks went by, helping Galatasaray win ten matches in a row and finish the first half of the season with 37 points, top of the league. By the end of matchday 34, right before the Süper Final series, Galatasaray was both the highest-scoring and least conceding team in the league, and had a nine-point gap with their closest competitors, Fenerbahçe.

İnan scored his first official goal for Galatasaray against Samsunspor on 18 September 2011. His first free-kick goal came against his former club Trabzonspor on 11 December. The game resulted in a 3–0 win for Galatasaray. He scored his second free-kick goal against Manisaspor on 21 December, was also the winner for Gala, as the game finished 1–0. His third free-kick goal came against Gençlerbirliği on 10 March 2012, a 2–0 win for Galatasaray. On 28 April, İnan scored his fourth free-kick goal of the season, being the second one against his former club Trabzonspor, followed by his fifth-free kick goal against Fenerbahçe in the Süper Final series. In his first season at Galatasaray, İnan scored a total of 13 goals and made 16 assists in both Süper Lig and Süper Final matches. During the championship celebrations, held at the Türk Telekom Arena on 13 May, İnan was called onstage twice by Galatasaray fans.

On 12 August 2012, defending Süper Lig champions Galatasaray beat the defending Turkish Cup winners Fenerbahçe in the 2012 Turkish Super Cup. İnan provided two assists to his teammate Umut Bulut and scored the winning goal himself from a penalty kick in the 90th minute right before the final whistle; the game finished 3–2. As Galatasaray won the Turkish Super Cup for the 12th time, Bulut was voted as the man of the match, although İnan also made a significant contribution to the victory.

İnan scored his first goal of the 2012–13 Süper Lig season – another late penalty – in the game against Beşiktaş on 26 August, the equalizer for Galatasaray as the game finished 3–3. İnan also had one assist in the game which was scored by Umut Bulut as İnan delivered in the corner kick from the left hand side. İnan scored his second goal of the season against İstanbul BB, which was assisted by striker Burak Yılmaz.

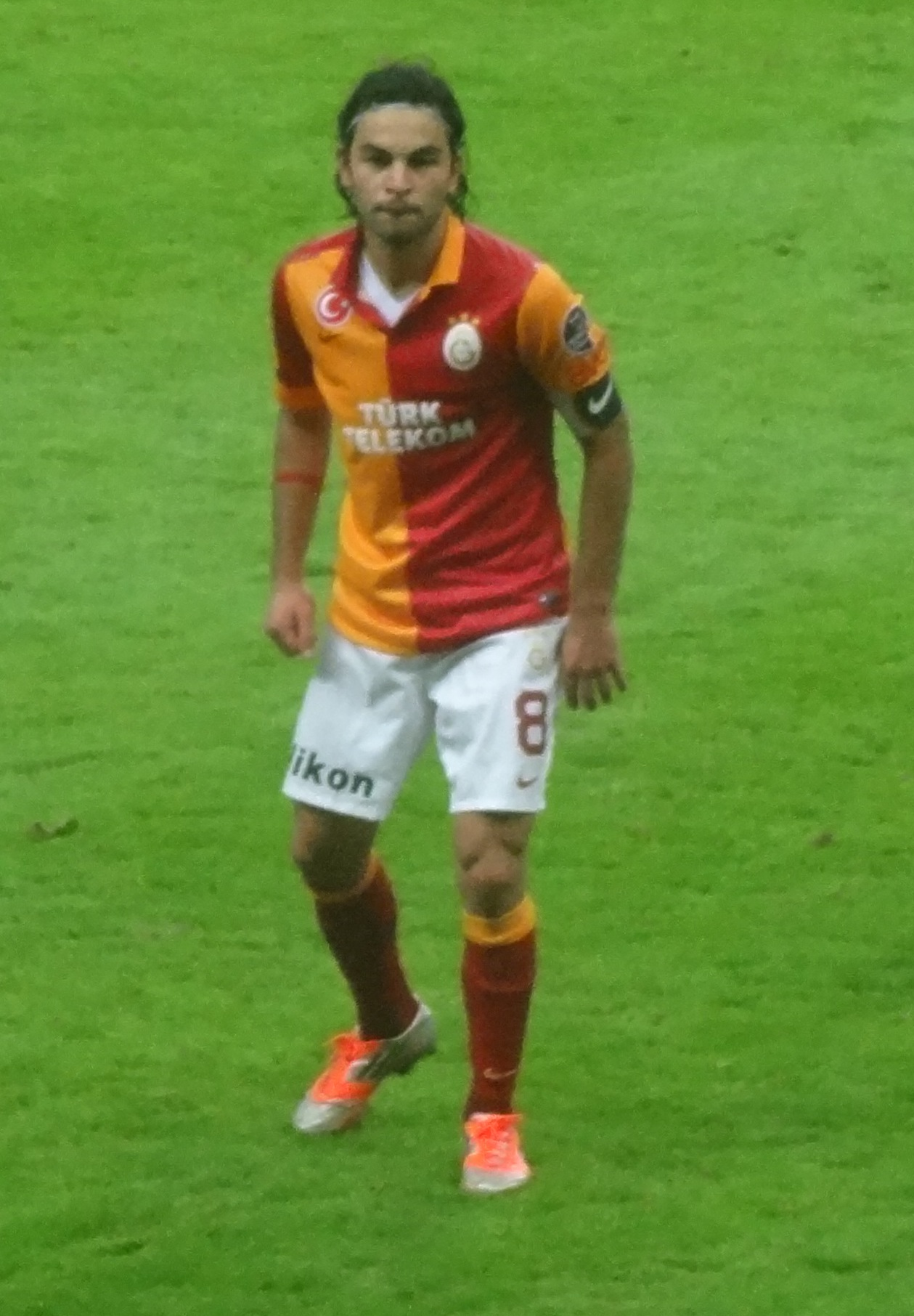
İnan in a September 2012 match against Akhisar Belediyespor

On 23 September, İnan started the game against Akhisar Belediyespor wearing the captain's armband, due to vice captain Hakan Balta's absence. The match resulted in a 3–0 win for Galatasaray. After a few disappointing performances both in Süper Lig and the UEFA Champions League during October, İnan responded with a wonderful display against Kayserispor in the Süper Lig match on 27 October, creating two assists to his teammates Burak Yılmaz and Cris, with Cris' header goal coming from the set piece free-kick which was taken by İnan by the left hand side.

İnan scored the free-kick distanced 30 yards, which was the winner goal in the last Kıtalar Arası Derbi of 2012 which secured a five-point gap in the league table as the game finished 2–1 for the Lions.

At the end of the first half of the 2012–13 Süper Lig season, the midfielder had scored four goals and made seven assists in total. İnan also made his mark on the 2012–13 UEFA Champions League scene, securing fifth-place in the group stage top passers list by UEFA. İnan had been second on the list after Barcelona's Xavi as late as matchday 5. The vice-captain was appointed as the first captain on 25 December.

İnan scored the fourth goal for Galatasaray in the game against Orduspor on 25 February 2013, as he received a ball from Burak Yılmaz right in front of the box. His curved shot from 30 yards out resulted in a spectacular goal which was also the decider as the game finished 4–2.

At the end of Galatasaray's 2012–13 Champions League campaign, where the Turkish outfit were eliminated by Real Madrid in the quarter-finals despite a 3–2 home win, İnan had made five assists in total and was again at second spot after Xavi in UEFA's top passers list. İnan also had 92% pass accuracy in the second leg of the tie against Real Madrid, where he produced 87 passes, which had been a Champions League record for the season.

İnan scored two goals in the Süper Lig game against Sivasspor on 5 May, where Galatasaray claimed their 19th league title. The free-kick goal eight minutes into the game, which also received an applause from Sivasspor manager Rıza Çalımbay, put the Lions up 1–0, followed by his second and the team's third goal, after catching Emmanuel Eboué's through-ball in the 60th minute. As Galatasaray won the game, İnan was chosen as man of the match.

==== 2013–20: Later career and retirement ====
İnan began the 2013–14 season with Galatasaray by participating in the Emirates Cup and played a key role in the team’s victory over Fenerbahçe in the Turkish Super Cup. Throughout the season, he was a regular starter in both the Süper Lig and UEFA Champions League, featuring against teams such as Real Madrid. He concluded the season by winning the Turkish Cup. In the 2014–15 season, following managerial changes — from Cesare Prandelli to Hamza Hamzaoğlu — his performances improved significantly. He helped the team secure both the Turkish Cup and the Turkish Super Cup titles that season. During the 2015–16 campaign, he once again lifted the Turkish Super Cup and contributed 4 goals and 5 assists in league play, also appearing in UEFA Europa League matches. The 2016–17 season saw him limited by injuries, though he still added another Turkish Super Cup to his accolades. In 2017–18, under manager Igor Tudor, he saw reduced playing time, but after Fatih Terim’s return to the club, İnan regained an important role and finished the season as a league champion. In the 2018–19 season, he helped the team win both the Turkish Cup and Turkish Super Cup, while also competing in the Europa League group stage. During the 2019–20 season, he saw less action, appearing in 13 matches, and at the end of the season, İnan announced his retirement from professional football.

== International career ==
=== Youth and early senior career ===
İnan has played at every level for Turkey from under-16 to the senior side. He made his debut against Moldova on 13 October 2007. Although he was called up back in February for the UEFA Euro 2008 qualifiers match against Georgia, İnan could not join the team on the pitch due to injury. He also did not take action at the Euro 2008 group stage due to a two-game suspension received prior to the tournament. İnan played at every game in UEFA Euro 2012 qualifiers and made six assists to his teammates in total, although it was not enough for the Turks to qualify for the tournament's final stages, in Poland and Ukraine. İnan scored his first international goal on 24 May 2012 in a 3–1 friendly match victory over Georgia.

=== Controversy with Turkey manager Avcı ===
During Turkey's 2014 World Cup qualifying campaign, Turkey manager Abdullah Avcı insisted on not playing İnan despite his great run of form with Galatasaray. Many Turkish fans refused to believe it was a tactical issue but was rather a case that had been played out off the pitch.

After a multiple games without İnan, Turkish fans began blaming the manager due to the unsuccessful results in qualifying. In a qualifier against Estonia, however, Avcı made a substitution in the 65th minute and İnan finally had his chance after a long period of dissension. The midfielder scored immediately and secured the win for Turkey. İnan, however, did not celebrate his goal and had a quiet statement after the game, as if like he was under pressure or did not have the liberty to talk.

As time progressed, Turkey failed to qualify for the 2014 World Cup, and uncertainties regarding İnan and Avcı were still a hot and live issue in the country. Journalist Fatih Altaylı claimed that he had witnessed certain information suggesting there had been a religious or a sectarian conflict between İnan and the manager, the reason why the two never got along. There have been no statements about the matter from either side.

=== Euro 2016 qualifiers and later years ===
Inan, a free-kick specialist, scored his most famous goal with the national team against Iceland in UEFA Euro 2016 qualifying Group A. Turkey, going into 89th minute with ten men and a score of 0-0 against an already qualified Iceland, had the chance to be the best third team if the match is won. Inan scored a spectacular free-kick from 30 yards out through the right side of Ögmundur Kristinsson, sending Turkey directly to EURO 2016, without playing the play-offs.

== Managerial career ==
=== Kasımpaşa ===
On 22 November 2022, İnan began his managerial career as the head coach of Kasımpaşa, signing a contract with the Süper Lig club. He left the position by mutual consent on 18 March 2023 after managing the team for 13 matches.

=== Gaziantep FK ===
On 8 March 2024, İnan was appointed as the head coach of Gaziantep FK, replacing Marius Șumudică. He successfully led the team to safety in the 2023–24 Süper Lig season, securing their place in the top flight. Following this achievement, the club announced a contract extension with İnan in June 2024 for the 2024–25 season.

In the 2024–25 season, İnan managed the team until May 2025. On 10 May 2025, Gaziantep FK announced that they had parted ways with İnan by mutual agreement. During his tenure of approximately 14 months, he oversaw 48 matches, recording 20 wins, 7 draws, and 21 losses.

=== Kocaelispor ===
On 3 June 2025, İnan was appointed as the new head coach of Kocaelispor, which had recently been promoted to the Süper Lig after a 16-year absence. He signed a one-year contract with an option for an additional year, replacing İsmet Taşdemir. As of February 2026, he continues to manage the team in the Süper Lig.

== Personal life ==
İnan often remains private and is not often seen in the media. He has two elder sisters and lives as a single person residing in Florya, Istanbul, near Galatasaray's main training facility, the Florya Metin Oktay Sports Complex and Training Center. İnan and former Galatasaray teammate Burak Yılmaz are close friends and have played together in four different club and national team set-ups, beginning with the Turkey U17 team. They also grew up knowing one another. Other clubs the two have played together on are Manisaspor, Trabzonspor and lastly Galatasaray. İnan married Cemre Kardeş on 16 June 2015. Their daughter, Lisa Alvin, was born on 19 September 2019.

== Career statistics ==
As of 9 February 2020.

=== Club ===
Club	Season	League			Cup		Super Cup		Europe		Total	
Club	Season	Division	Apps	Goals	Apps	Goals	Apps	Goals	Apps	Goals	Apps	Goals
Dardanelspor	2002–03	2.Lig	20	2	1	0	—		—		21	2
Dardanelspor	2003–04	2.Lig	14	0	0	0	—		—		14	0
Dardanelspor	2004–05	2.Lig	27	2	1	0	—		—		28	2
Dardanelspor	2005–06	2.Lig	15	2	0	0	—		—		15	2
Dardanelspor	Total		76	6	2	0	—		—		78	6
Manisaspor	2005–06	Süper Lig	13	3	0	0	—		—		13	3
Manisaspor	2006–07	Süper Lig	32	3	7	0	—		—		39	3
Manisaspor	2007–08	Süper Lig	30	5	4	1	—		—		34	6
Manisaspor	Total		75	11	11	1	—		—		86	12
Trabzonspor	2008–09	Süper Lig	32	3	4	0	—		—		36	3
Trabzonspor	2009–10	Süper Lig	28	2	10	0	0	0	2	0	40	2
Trabzonspor	2010–11	Süper Lig	33	2	2	0	—		2	0	37	2
Trabzonspor	Total		93	7	16	0	0	0	4	0	113	7
Galatasaray	2011–12	Süper Lig	39	13	1	0	—		—		40	13
Galatasaray	2012–13	Süper Lig	31	6	0	0	1	1	10	0	42	7
Galatasaray	2013–14	Süper Lig	31	5	5	4	1	0	8	0	45	9
Galatasaray	2014–15	Süper Lig	32	4	7	3	1	0	4	0	44	7
Galatasaray	2015–16	Süper Lig	28	11	7	1	1	0	7	2	43	14
Galatasaray	2016–17	Süper Lig	32	6	3	0	1	0	—		36	6
Galatasaray	2017–18	Süper Lig	23	0	8	1	—		2	0	33	1
Galatasaray	2018–19	Süper Lig	22	0	7	1	1	0	5	1	35	2
Galatasaray	2019–20	Süper Lig	6	0	2	0	1	0	2	0	11	0
Galatasaray	Total		244	45	40	10	7	1	38	3	329	59
Career total			488	69	69	11	7	1	42	3	606	84

=== International ===
Turkey
Year	Apps	Goals
2007	1	0
2008	1	0
2009	0	0
2010	7	0
2011	9	0
2012	5	2
2013	9	2
2014	8	1
2015	8	3
2016	8	0
2017	5	0
Total	61	8

=== International goals ===
Scores and results table list Turkey's goal tally first:

#	Date	Venue	Opponent	Score	Result	Competition
1.	24 May 2012	Red Bull Arena, Salzburg, Austria	Georgia	3–1	3–1	Friendly
2.	11 September 2012	Şükrü Saracoğlu Stadium, Istanbul, Turkey	Estonia	3–0	3–0	2014 FIFA World Cup qualification
3.	22 March 2013	Estadi Comunal d'Andorra la Vella, Andorra la Vella, Andorra	Andorra	1–0	2–0	2014 FIFA World Cup qualification
4.	28 May 2013	MSV-Arena, Duisburg, Germany	Latvia	2–0	3–3	Friendly
5.	1 June 2014	Red Bull Arena, New Jersey, United States	United States	1–2	1–2	Friendly
6.	3 September 2015	Konya Metropolitan Municipality Stadium, Konya, Turkey	Latvia	1–0	1–1	UEFA Euro 2016 qualifying
7.	10 October 2015	Generali Arena, Prague, Czech Republic	Czech Republic	1–0	2–0	UEFA Euro 2016 qualifying
8.	13 October 2015	Konya Metropolitan Municipality Stadium, Konya, Turkey	Iceland	1–0	1–0	UEFA Euro 2016 qualifying

== Managerial statistics ==
As of match played 21 November 2026

Managerial record by team and tenure
Team	Nat	From	To	Record							
Team	Nat	From	To	G	W	D	L	GF	GA	GD	Win %
Kasımpaşa	(Turkey)	22 November 2022	18 March 2023	13	3	2	8	21	24	−3	23.08
Gaziantep	(Turkey)	8 March 2024	10 May 2025	48	20	7	21	68	67	+1	41.67
Kocaelispor	(Turkey)	1 July 2025	Present	52	18	13	21	49	53	−4	34.62
Career total				113	41	22	50	138	144	−6	36.28

== Honours ==
Trabzonspor

- Turkish Cup: 2009–10
- Turkish Super Cup: 2010

Galatasaray

- Süper Lig: 2011–12, 2012–13, 2014–15, 2017–18, 2018–19
- Türkiye Kupası: 2013–14, 2014–15, 2015–16, 2018–19
- Süper Kupa: 2012, 2013, 2015, 2016, 2019

Individual

- Süper Lig Top Assister 2011–12 (16)
- Süper Lig Midfielder of the Year 2011–12
- Süper Lig Player of the Year 2011–12, by UEFA

Sporting positions
Preceded by Sabri Sarıoğlu	Galatasaray captain 2014–2020	Succeeded by Fernando Muslera
