= Ceyhun Gülselam =

Turkish footballer (born 1987)

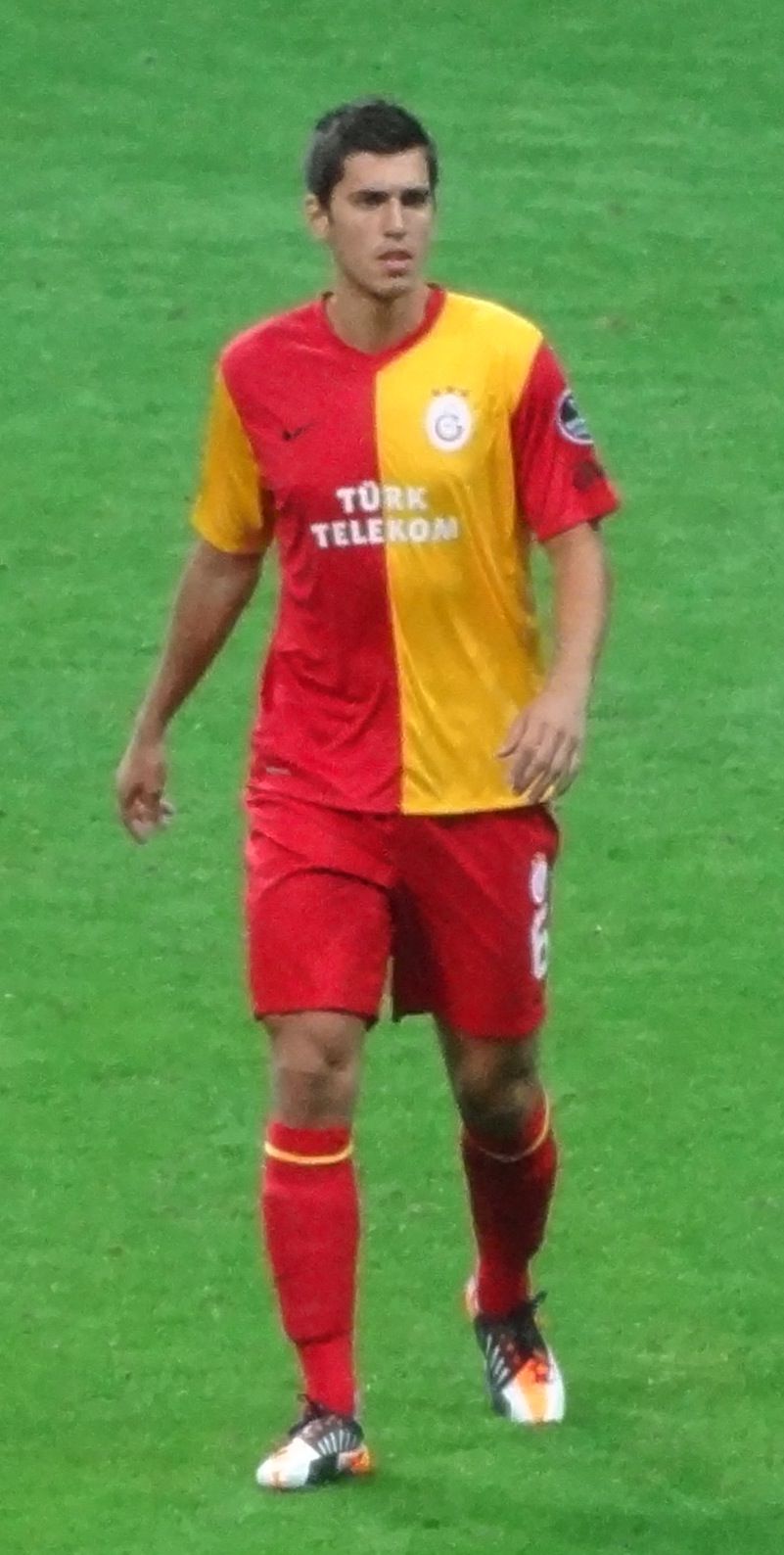

Personal information
- Full name: Ceyhun Gülselam
- Date of birth: 25 December 1987 (age 38)
- Place of birth: Munich, West Germany
- Height: 1.92 m (6 ft 4 in)
- Position: Defensive midfielder

Team information
- Current team: Altay
- Number: 6

Youth career
- 1994–1995: Gartenstadt Trudering
- 1995–2003: Bayern Munich
- 2003–2005: SpVgg Unterhaching

Senior career*
| Years | Team | Apps | (Gls) |
| 2005–2007 | SpVgg Unterhaching II | 31 | (6) |
| 2007–2008 | SpVgg Unterhaching | 38 | (6) |
| 2008–2011 | Trabzonspor | 69 | (6) |
| 2011–2014 | Galatasaray | 33 | (1) |
| 2013 | → Kayserispor (loan) | 16 | (1) |
| 2014–2016 | Hannover 96 | 30 | (1) |
| 2016–2018 | Karabükspor | 44 | (0) |
| 2018 | Osmanlıspor | 15 | (1) |
| 2018–2021 | Alanyaspor | 78 | (4) |
| 2021– | Altay | 82 | (4) |

International career
| 2007–2008 | Turkey U21 | 12 | (2) |
| 2011 | Turkey A2 | 1 | (0) |
| 2008–2009 | Turkey | 6 | (0) |
- * Club domestic league appearances and goals as of 21 August 2024

Ceyhun Gülselam (born 25 December 1987) is a Turkish professional footballer who plays as a center back and defensive midfielder. He plays for Altay.

== Club career ==
Gülselam also played eight years for the Bayern Munich Junior Team before joining SpVgg Unterhaching.

=== Trabzonspor ===
During the summer of 2008, Ceyhun signed a three-year contract with Trabzonspor. He spent three seasons in Trabzon, before going to Istanbul to play for Galatasaray.

=== Galatasaray ===
On 11 June 2011, Galatasaray signed Ceyhun on a free transfer until the end of 2013–14 season. Ceyhun scored his first goal for Galatasaray against his former club Trabzonspor.

On 10 January 2013, he left on loan to Kayserispor for €200,000.

Ceyhun returned to Galatasaray after his impressive loan spell at Kayserispor. However, the club did not seek to extend his contract and he joined Hannover for two years on 24 July 2014.

On 4 January 2018, he joined Osmanlıspor in the Turkish Süper Lig on a free transfer.

On 29 August 2018, he has signed with Alanyaspor.

== International career ==
He has played for the Turkey national under-21 football team. He debuted for the Turkey national football team against Belarus on 26 March 2008.

== Career statistics ==
=== Club ===
As of 28 June 2016.

| Club | Season | League | | Cup | | League Cup | | Europe | | Total | |
| Club | Season | Apps | Goals | Apps | Goals | Apps | Goals | Apps | Goals | Apps | Goals |
|---|---|---|---|---|---|---|---|---|---|---|---|
| SpVgg Unterhaching | 2006–07 | 9 | 1 | — | | — | | — | | 9 | 1 |
| SpVgg Unterhaching | 2007–08 | 29 | 5 | 1 | 0 | — | | — | | 30 | 5 |
| SpVgg Unterhaching | Total | 38 | 6 | 1 | 0 | — | | — | | 39 | 6 |
| Trabzonspor | 2008–09 | 16 | 2 | 5 | 2 | — | | — | | 21 | 4 |
| Trabzonspor | 2009–10 | 28 | 3 | 8 | 0 | — | | 1 | 1 | 37 | 4 |
| Trabzonspor | 2010–11 | 25 | 1 | 3 | 0 | 1 | 0 | 2 | 0 | 31 | 1 |
| Trabzonspor | Total | 69 | 6 | 16 | 2 | 1 | 0 | 3 | 1 | 89 | 9 |
| Galatasaray | 2011–12 | 12 | 1 | 1 | 0 | — | | — | | 13 | 1 |
| Galatasaray | 2012–13 | 1 | 0 | 2 | 1 | 0 | 0 | 0 | 0 | 3 | 1 |
| Kayserispor (loan) | 2012–13 | 16 | 1 | 0 | 0 | — | | — | | 16 | 1 |
| Kayserispor (loan) | Total | 16 | 1 | 0 | 0 | — | | — | | 16 | 1 |
| Galatasaray | 2013–14 | 20 | 0 | 7 | 1 | 0 | 0 | 4 | 0 | 31 | 1 |
| Galatasaray | Total | 33 | 1 | 10 | 2 | 0 | 0 | 4 | 0 | 47 | 3 |
| Hannover 96 | 2014–15 | 18 | 1 | 2 | 0 | — | | — | | 20 | 1 |
| Hannover 96 | 2015–16 | 12 | 0 | 0 | 0 | — | | — | | 12 | 0 |
| Hannover 96 | Total | 30 | 1 | 2 | 0 | — | | — | | 32 | 1 |
| Career total | | 186 | 15 | 29 | 4 | 1 | 0 | 7 | 1 | 223 | 20 |

== Honours ==
Trabzonspor

- Türkiye Kupası: 2009–10
- Turkish Super Cup: 2010

Galatasaray

- Süper Lig: 2011–12
- Süper Kupa: 2012, 2013
- Türkiye Kupası: 2013–14
