= Sezer Badur =

Turkish-German footballer

Personal information
- Date of birth: 20 June 1984 (age 42)
- Place of birth: West Berlin, West Germany
- Height: 1.81 m (5 ft 11 1/2 in)
- Position: Central midfielder

Youth career
- –1996: BSC Kickers 1900
- 1996–1999: Hertha Zehlendorf
- 1999–2002: Tennis Borussia Berlin
- 2002–2003: Borussia Dortmund

Senior career*
Years	Team	Apps	(Gls)
2003–2004	Manisaspor	7	(0)
2004–2005	Berliner AK 07		
2005–2006	SV Yeşilyurt		
2006–2007	Karşıyaka	34	(8)
2007–2009	Sivasspor	64	(7)
2010–2012	Trabzonspor	11	(0)
2012	Gaziantepspor	8	(0)
2012–2013	Elazığspor	13	(0)
2013–2014	Şanlıurfaspor	19	(2)
2014–2016	Antalyaspor	28	(3)
- * Club domestic league appearances and goals as of 4 October 2015

Sezer Badur (born 20 June 1984 in West Berlin) is a Turkish-German footballer who plays as an attacking midfielder.

== Club career ==
During his youth Badur played for several local clubs in his hometown Berlin. 2002 he moved to the youth ranks of Borussia Dortmund, however left the club only after a year to join Turkish Manisaspor.

His debut in Turkish football scene was with Vestel Manisaspor in 2003–04. He appeared in eight matches for Manisaspor but he could not score. Then he returned to Germany to play for the amateur side Berliner AK 07 since he was out of favor at Manisaspor, and Manisaspor were unwilling to let him out of his contract.

He played two years in amateur division in Germany. After a short stint with SV Yeşilyurt he was transferred to Karşıyaka, a football team based in İzmir Province. After a while the team did not pay his salary. Therefore, he left the team. Subsequently, Sivasspor signed Badur where he began to shine and had two consecutive seasons where he and his teammates played the top of the table, missing the champion's trophy narrowly twice. After his successful time for Sivasspor, in January 2010, Trabzonspor acquired Badur's services for a transfer fee of €330,000.

== Honours ==
Trabzonspor

- Turkish Cup: 2009–10
