= Barış Memiş =

Turkish footballer (born 1990)

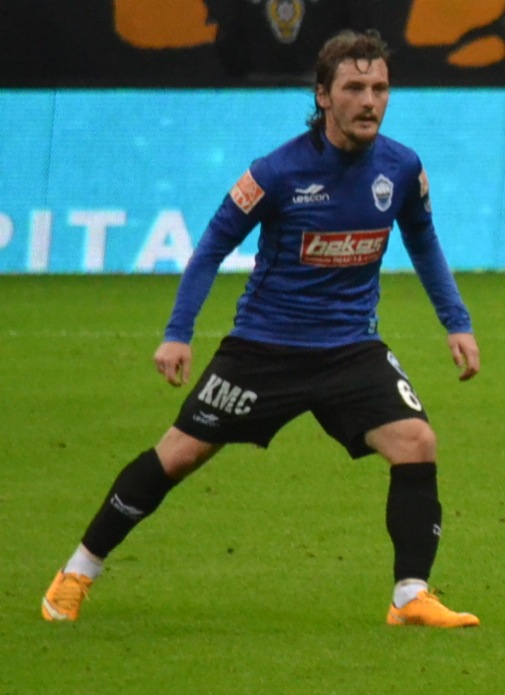
- Memiş playing for Kayseri Erciyesspor in 2015

Personal information
- Date of birth: 5 January 1990 (age 36)
- Place of birth: Akçaabat, Trabzon, Turkey
- Height: 1.68 m (5 ft 6 in)
- Position: Winger

Team information
- Current team: Sarıyer
- Number: 11

Youth career
- 2002–2007: Trabzonspor

Senior career*
Years	Team	Apps	(Gls)
2007–2014	Trabzonspor	35	(2)
2010–2011	→ Karşıyaka (loan)	12	(0)
2012–2014	→ 1461 Trabzon (loan)	42	(12)
2014–2016	Kayseri Erciyesspor	24	(0)
2016	1461 Trabzon	8	(0)
2016–2017	Adanaspor	1	(0)
2017–2018	Eyüpspor	2	(0)
2018	Bağcılar SK	2	(0)
2018–2019	Yomraspor	16	(2)
2019–	Sarıyer	61	(2)

International career
2005	Turkey U15	5	(0)
2006–2007	Turkey U16	11	(1)
2006–2007	Turkey U17	12	(2)
2007–2008	Turkey U18	7	(4)
2007–2009	Turkey U19	18	(3)
2008–2009	Turkey U21	3	(0)
2013	Turkey B	1	(0)
- * Club domestic league appearances and goals as of 5 November 2022

Barış Memiş (born 5 January 1990) is a Turkish professional footballer. He plays as an attacking midfielder for Sarıyer. In 2011 he was banned from football for two years for using banned substances.

== Life and career ==
Memiş began his football career in 2002 when he signed a youth contract with Trabzonspor. He was promoted to the senior squad in 2007, following the departure of Gökdeniz Karadeniz.

At the start of the 2008–09 season, Memiş was given the number 61, which is of significance because it is the city code of Trabzon. The number has since been given to Ibrahima Yattara. Memiş signed a three-year contract extension on 1 June 2009 and another one on 1 June 2012.

In 2011 he was banned from football for two years for using banned substances.

== Honours ==
Trabzonspor

- Turkish Cup: 2009–10
- Turkish Super Cup: 2010
