= Alanzinho =

Brazilian footballer (born 1983)

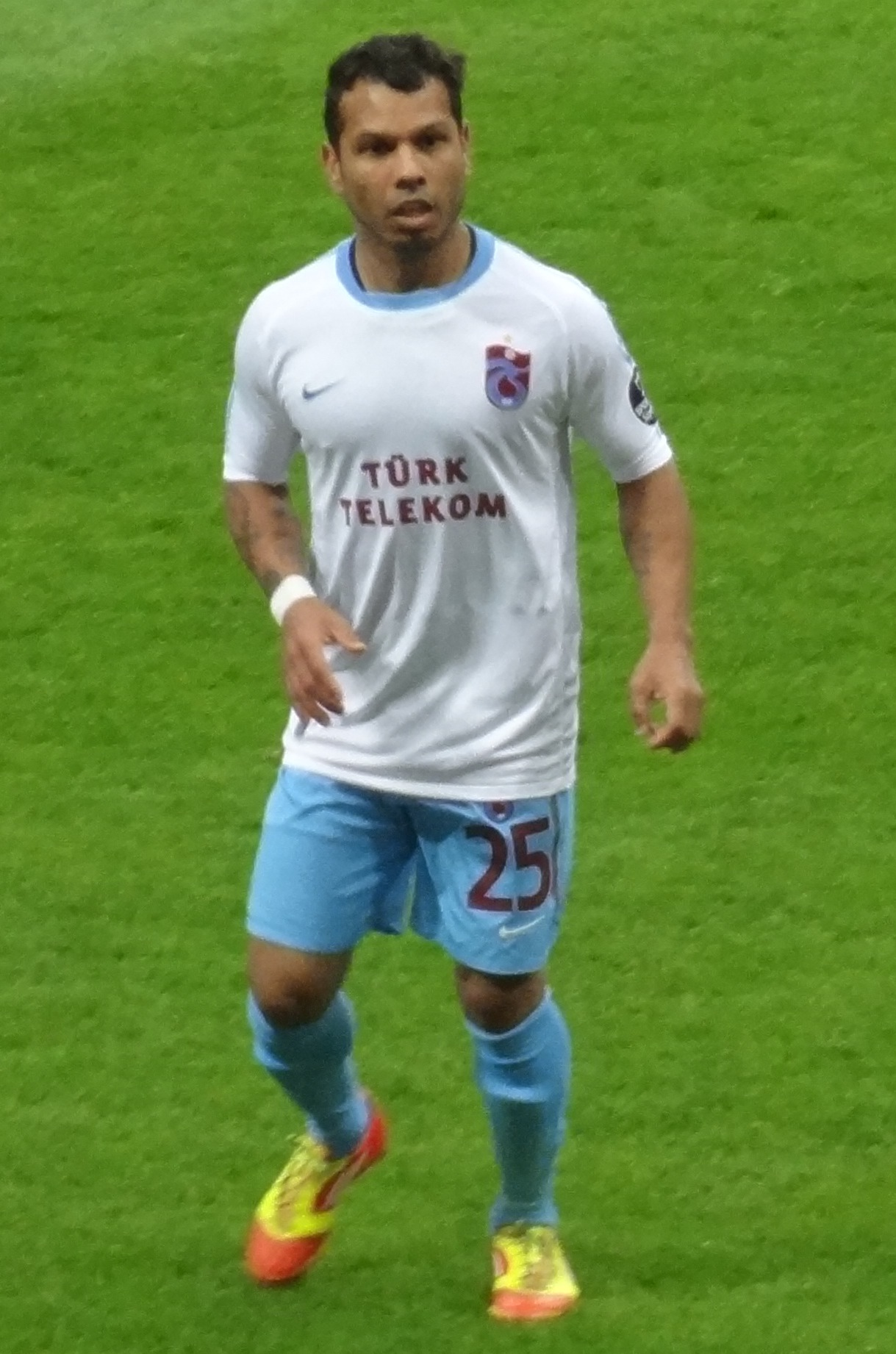
- With Trabzonspor in 2012

Personal information
- Full name: Alan Carlos Gomes da Costa
- Date of birth: 22 February 1983 (age 43)
- Place of birth: Rio de Janeiro, Brazil
- Height: 1.64 m (5 ft 4 1/2 in)
- Position: Attacking midfielder

Youth career
- Flamengo

Senior career*
Years	Team	Apps	(Gls)
2000–2003	Flamengo	6	(0)
2004	America-RJ	0	(0)
2005	Paranoá	0	(0)
2005–2009	Stabæk	83	(19)
2009–2014	Trabzonspor	140	(11)
2014	Balıkesirspor	14	(1)
2015	Gaziantep BB	39	(6)
2016	Stabæk	8	(1)
2017–2018	Sinopspor		
2018	Portuguesa-RJ	3	(0)
2018–2019	Barra da Tijuca	8	(0)
2019	Madureira	3	(0)
- * Club domestic league appearances and goals

Alan Carlos Gomes da Costa (born 22 February 1983), commonly known as Alanzinho, is a Brazilian retired footballer who played as an attacking midfielder.

His former clubs include Flamengo (2002–2003), America-RJ (2004), Paranoá (2005) and Stabæk (2005–2009).

== Career ==
=== Stabæk ===
Alanzinho played an important part during Stabæk's title winning season in 2008, winning both NISO's player of the year award – an award where every league player cast a vote – and the Kniksen midfield of the year award.

On 15 May 2008, Alanzinho penned a three-year deal with Stabæk.

=== Trabzonspor ===
On 27 January 2009, Stabæk officially confirmed that they had agreed with Trabzonspor and that Alanzinho was free to go to Turkey to undergo a medical and agree on personal terms. He signed an official contract for Trabzonspor on 28 January 2009, his contract lasts for 3 1/2 years until the summer of 2012.

He scored his first goal against Galatasaray.

=== Balıkesirspor ===
In July 2014, Alanzinho signed a contract with newly promoted team Balıkesirspor. The contract was for two years.

== Career statistics ==
As of 30 November 2016

Appearances and goals by club, season and competition
Club	Season	League			Cup		Continental		Total	
Club	Season	Division	Apps	Goals	Apps	Goals	Apps	Goals	Apps	Goals
Flamengo	2003	Série A	6	0	0	0	—		6	0
America (RJ)	2004	Série C			1	0	—			
Paranoá	2005	Série C	0	0	—		—		0	0
Stabæk	2005	Adeccoligaen	11	3	1	0	—		12	3
Stabæk	2006	Tippeligaen	21	2	3	1	—		24	3
Stabæk	2007	Tippeligaen	26	5	6	4	—		32	9
Stabæk	2008	Tippeligaen	25	9	7	3	2	0	34	12
Stabæk	Total		83	19	17	8	2	0	102	27
Trabzonspor	2008–09	Süper Lig	17	4	0	0	—		17	4
Trabzonspor	2009–10	Süper Lig	29	1	9	2	2	0	40	3
Trabzonspor	2010–11	Süper Lig	29	3	3	1	2	0	34	4
Trabzonspor	2011–12	Süper Lig	37	2	2	1	11	0	50	3
Trabzonspor	2012–13	Süper Lig	27	1	6	1	2	0	35	2
Trabzonspor	2013–14	Süper Lig	1	0	0	0	8	0	9	0
Trabzonspor	Total		140	11	20	4	25	0	185	15
Balıkesirspor	2014–15	Süper Lig	14	1	0	0	—		14	1
Gaziantep BB	2014–15	TFF First League	18	5	0	0	—		18	5
Gaziantep BB	2015–16	TFF First League	21	1	0	0	—		21	1
Gaziantep BB	Total		39	6	0	0	0	0	39	6
Stabæk	2016	Tippeligaen	8	1	0	0	—		8	1
Career total			290	38	38	12	27	0	355	50

== Honours ==
Stabæk

- Tippeligaen: 2008

Trabzonspor

- Turkish Cup: 2010
- Turkish Super Cup: 2010

Individual

- Kniksen Award: Midfielder of the Year in 2007, Midfielder of the Year in 2008
- NISO Player's player of the year Award
