= Engin Baytar =

Turkish professional footballer

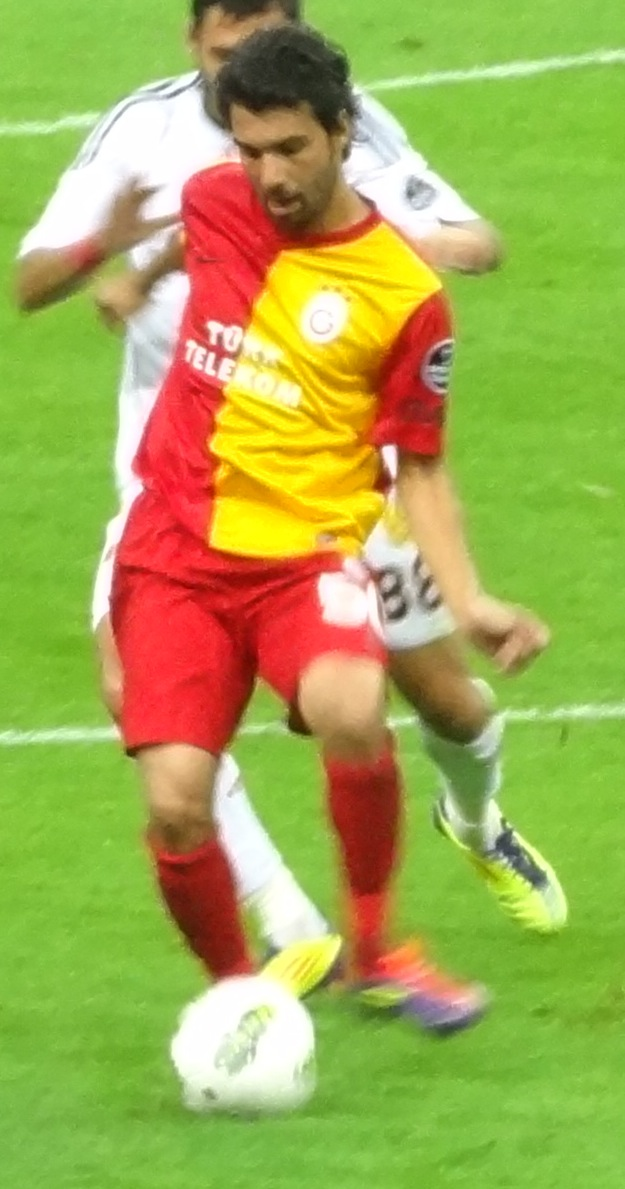

Personal information
- Full name: Engin Baytar
- Date of birth: 11 July 1983 (age 43)
- Place of birth: Gütersloh, West Germany
- Height: 1.76 m (5 ft 9 in)
- Position: Winger

Youth career
- 1996–2000: FC Gütersloh
- 2000–2004: Arminia Bielefeld II

Senior career*
Years	Team	Apps	(Gls)
2004–2006	Maltepespor	29	(2)
2006–2009	Gençlerbirliği	66	(9)
2009	→ Eskişehirspor (loan)	11	(1)
2009–2011	Trabzonspor	38	(3)
2011–2015	Galatasaray	47	(3)
2014	→ Çaykur Rizespor (loan)	4	(2)
2015–2016	Karşıyaka	9	(2)
2016–2017	BB Erzurumspor	13	(4)
2017	İstanbulspor	7	(1)
2017	Malatyaspor		
2018	Karadeniz Ereğli Belediyespor		
2018	Yeşilova		
2018–2019	Gaziosmanpaşaspor	1	(0)
2019–2021	İstanbul Siirtgücüspor		

International career
2010–2012	Turkey	3	(0)
- * Club domestic league appearances and goals as of 23 April 2024

Engin Baytar (born 11 July 1983) is a Turkish professional footballer who plays as a winger.

Baytar was born and raised in Germany to Turkish parents. He first joined FC Gütersloh before transferring to Arminia Bielefeld in 2000. Baytar spent four years with the club's reserve team before moving to Turkey-based club Maltepespor in 2004. He spent two at the club before moving to Gençlerbirliği, who loaned him out to Eskişehirspor for the second half of the 2008–2009 season. Baytar wears the number 50 on his jersey because he is from the Central Anatolian Province of Nevsehir in Turkey. His father is from Trabzon and mother is from Nevsehir.

== Trabzonspor ==
He was transferred to Trabzonspor at the beginning of the 2009–10 season and won the 2009–10 Turkish Cup, scoring in the Final against Rivals Fenerbahçe in a 3–1 win, where he became the Man of the Match as well as winning the 2010 Turkish Super Cup.

== Galatasaray ==
On 17 August 2011, Engin Baytar joined Galatasaray for 2 years for a fee of €1.1 million. He made his first assist at the match against Bursaspor to Johan Elmander on 26 November. He scored his first goal with Galatasaray against Sivasspor. He was however also shown a red card in the same match. He returned to the club after a loan-spell for the new season, but did not make the 18-man league squad.

== Career statistics ==
As of 24 September 2014.

=== Club ===
Club	Season	League		Cup		League Cup		Europe		Total	
Club	Season	Apps	Goals	Apps	Goals	Apps	Goals	Apps	Goals	Apps	Goals
Gençlerbirliği	2005–06	4	0	0	0	—		—		4	0
Gençlerbirliği	2006–07	26	6	7	3	—		—		33	9
Gençlerbirliği	2007–08	27	2	8	1	—		—		35	3
Gençlerbirliği	2008–09	12	1	0	0	—		—		12	1
Gençlerbirliği	Total	69	9	15	4	—		—		84	13
Eskişehirspor (loan)	2008–09	11	1	0	0	—		—		11	1
Eskişehirspor (loan)	Total	11	1	0	0	—		—		11	1
Trabzonspor	2009–10	20	2	9	2	—		1	0	30	4
Trabzonspor	2010–11	18	1	3	0	—		0	0	21	1
Trabzonspor	Total	38	3	12	2	—		1	0	51	5
Galatasaray	2011–12	33	2	2	1	0	0	—		35	3
Galatasaray	2012–13	7	0	2	0	1	0	1	0	11	0
Galatasaray	2013–14	7	1	1	1	0	0	1	0	9	2
Galatasaray	2014–15	0	0	0	0	0	0	0	0	0	0
Galatasaray	Total	47	3	5	2	1	0	2	0	55	5
Çaykur Rizespor (loan)	2013–14	4	2	—		—		—		4	2
Çaykur Rizespor (loan)	Total	4	2	—		—		—		4	2
Career total		169	18	32	8	1	0	3	0	205	26

== Honours ==
Trabzonspor

- Türkiye Kupası: 2009–10
- Süper Kupa: 2010

Galatasaray

- Süper Lig: 2011–12, 2012–13
- Süper Kupa: 2012
