= Şanlıurfa 11 April Stadium =

Stadium in Şanlıurfa, Turkey

- Şanlıurfa 11 Nisan Stadyumu
- GAP Stadium
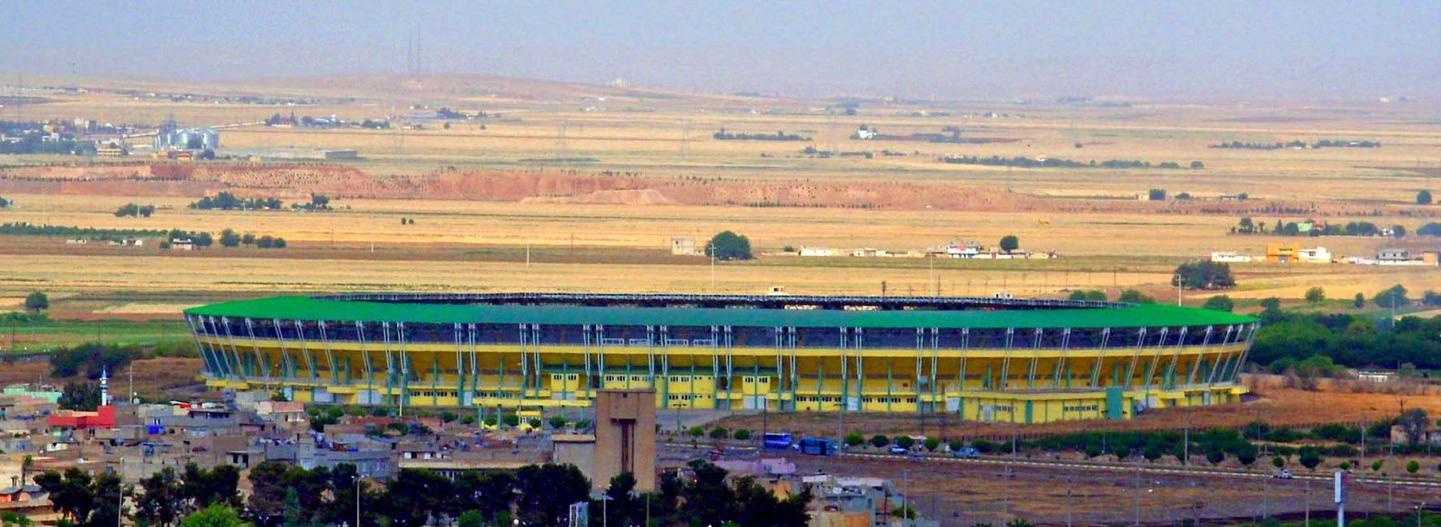

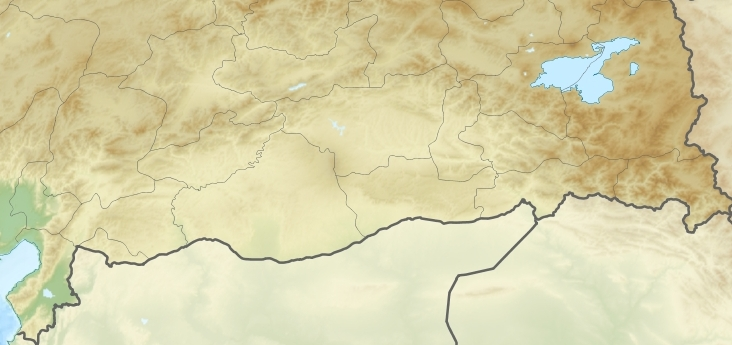
- Location in Southeastern Turkey Location in Turkey
- Full name: Şanlıurfa Güneydoğu Anadolu Projesi Stadyumu
- Former names: GAP Arena (2009–17)
- Location: Şanlıurfa, Turkey
- Coordinates: 37°08′52″N 38°48′24″E
- Owner: GSGM
- Capacity: 28,965
- Surface: Grass
- Record attendance: 28,865 (11 June 2023, Şanlıurfaspor-24 Erzincanspor)
- Field size: 105 x 68 m

Construction
- Built: 1992–2009
- Opened: 13 December 2009
- Cost: 42 million TL
- Architect: A&Z Aksu
- General contractor: Bozoglu construction company

Tenant
- Şanlıurfaspor

Şanlıurfa 11 April Stadium (Turkish: Şanlıurfa 11 Nisan Stadyumu) is a multi-purpose stadium in Şanlıurfa, Turkey. It is the home stadium of Şanlıurfaspor. The stadium holds 28,965 spectators and was opened in 2009.

== Events ==
- The FIM FreeStyle Motocross World Championship :
  Over 15–16 May 2010, the international NIGHT of the JUMPs series is making a tour stop in the GAP Stadium in Şanlıurfa, Turkey.
- Turkey's EURO 2016 Bid :
  It was one of the 3 candidate reserve stadiums of Turkey's losing bid for EURO 2016.
- 2009–2010 Ziraat Turkish Cup Final :
  Trabzonspor vs Fenerbahçe Ziraat Turkish Cup Final was played in the Şanlıurfa GAP Stadium on 5 May 2010. Trabzonspor won this game 3–1.
- 2023 Turkish Super Cup
