= Halis Özkahya =

Turkish football referee

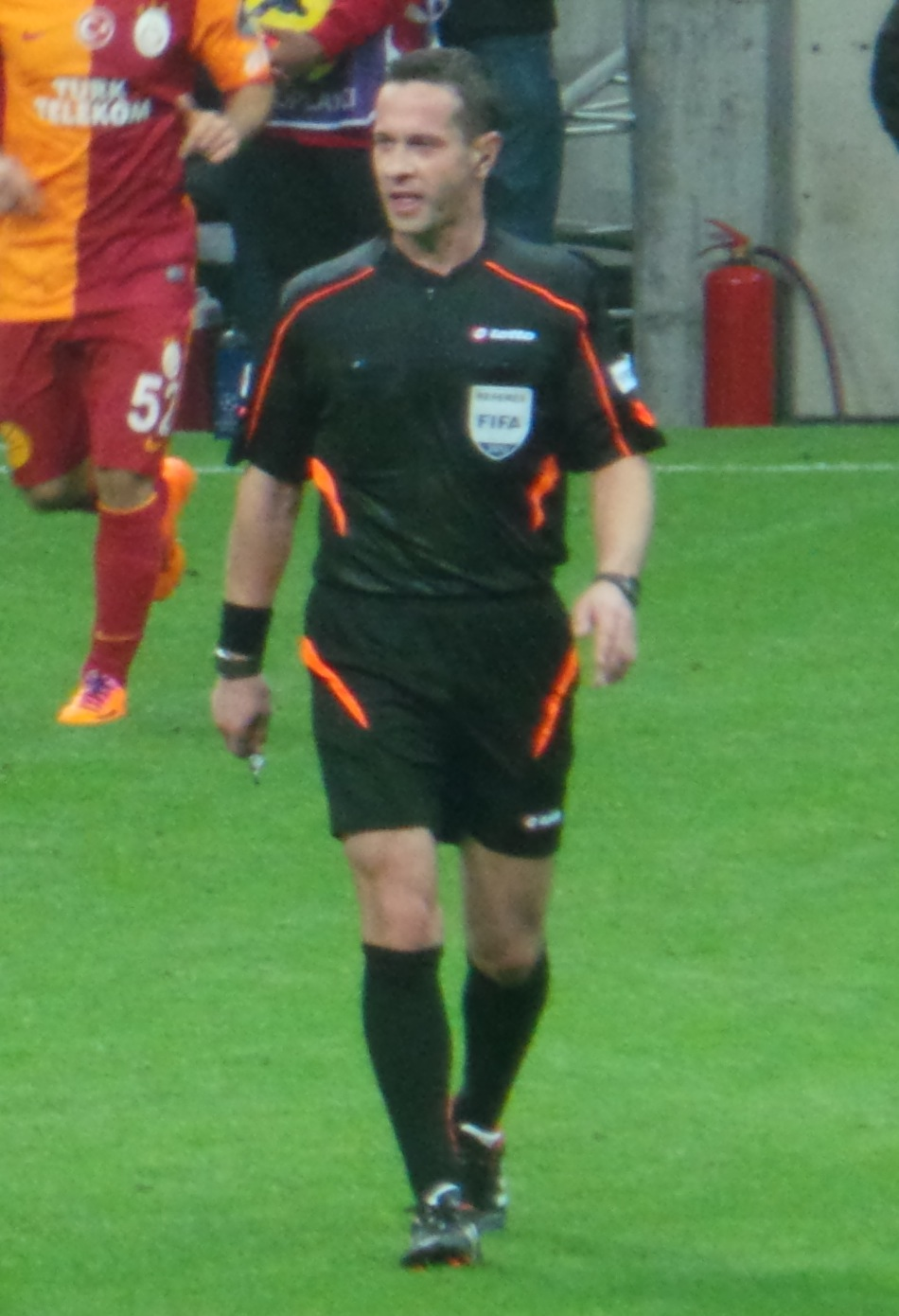
- Full name: Halis Özkahya
- Born: 30 May 1980 (age 46); Kütahya, Turkey

Domestic
Years	League	Role
2005–	Süper Lig	Referee

Halis Özkahya (born 30 May 1980) is a Turkish football referee. He officiated the 2012–13 UEFA Europa League group stage match between Lyon and Ironi Kiryat Shmona.

He became a FIFA referee in 2009. He has served as a referee in 2014 World Cup qualifying, beginning with the Group C match between Germany and Kazakhstan.
