= 2010–11 Trabzonspor season =

Trabzonspor
2010–11 season
- President: Sadri Şener
- Manager: Şenol Güneş
- Stadium: Hüseyin Avni Aker Stadium
- Süper Lig: 2nd
- Turkish Cup: Group stage
- Turkish Super Cup: Winners
- UEFA Europa League: Play-off round
- Top goalscorer: League: Burak Yılmaz (19); All: Burak Yılmaz (20)
Home colours	Away colours	Third colours

The 2010–11 season was Trabzonspor's 36th consecutive season in the Süper Lig.

Trabzonspor's primary objective was to regain the Süper Lig title for the first time since 1984. They also aimed to defend their Turkish Cup title, which would allow them to surpass Beşiktaş for second-most Turkish Cups of all time, with nine. Having won the 2009–10 Turkish Cup, the club competed in the 2010 Turkish Super Cup against league champions Bursaspor. Trabzonspor won 3–0 thanks to a hat-trick from forward Teófilo Gutiérrez. Brazilian forward Jackson Coelho, nicknamed Jajá, signed for the club on the same day of the Super Cup.

The club started their domestic league season against Ankaragücü on 15 August 2010, winning 2–0, with both goals coming from Gutiérrez. They also competed in the UEFA Europa League, beginning their campaign against three-time winners Liverpool, and were knocked out after losing 1–3 on aggregate.

== Review ==
=== Pre-season ===
It was announced on 25 May 2010 that Trabzonspor would begin their pre-season preparations in Isparta on 27 June. They played their first friendly of the new season on 8 July against Gaziantepspor. The match ended with no goals scored by either team. The club spent thirteen days in Isparta before traveling to Germany on 12 July for nineteen days. The second camp consisted of six friendly matches against FC Wegberg-Beek, F.C. Porto, SC Fortuna Köln, Standard Liège, K.R.C. Genk and Fortuna Sittard. Trabzonspor signed Polish defender Arkadiusz Głowacki for a reported €1 million on 13 June. Before joining the Black Sea club, Głowacki was named the best defender of the Ekstraklasa in 2009. Barış Ataş became the club's third signing of the season when he joined on a free transfer from Diyarbakırspor on 22 June 2010. Ibrahim Yattara was named captain on 26 June following former captain Rigobert Song's departure. Rumours were leaked on 13 July that stated forward Teófilo Gutiérrez was looking to leave the club before their departure to Germany on 12 July. Gutiérrez was unable to obtain a visa when he first transferred to Turkey in January, and had not done so since then. As a result, Gutiérrez was unable to travel with the team to their pre-season camp in Germany, and was instead left in Istanbul. He was expected to join the team on 15 July. The Colombian forward joined the squad on 17 July 2010. The club finished their pre-season preparations with a record of five wins, one draw, and two losses.

=== August ===
Because Trabzonspor won the Turkish Cup in 2010, they took part in the Turkish Super Cup. The final took place at Atatürk Olympic Stadium on 7 August against league champions Bursaspor. To commemorate the event, Nike manufactured a special kit. Trabzonspor won the match 3–0, with all three goals coming from Teófilo Gutiérrez. The list of fixtures for the first half of the Süper Lig season were released on 21 July. Trabzonspor started their season on the road against Ankaragücü, before playing their first home match against Fenerbahçe. Trabzonspor opened up the domestic season by defeating Ankaragücü two to nil, with two second half goals from Teófilo Gutiérrez sealing the match. Trabzonspor transferred former FC Schalke 04 youth product Volkan Ünlü from feeder club MVV on 17 August. He was immediately loaned out to Trabzonspor's other feeder club, 1461 Trabzon. Trabzonspor started their European campaign against Liverpool F.C. in the play-off round of the 2010–11 UEFA Europa League on 19 August 2010. The club previously faced the then-English champions in the second round of the 1976–77 European Cup, with Trabzonspor winning the first leg 1–0, but losing the second leg 0–3. Liverpool went on to win the competition. Trabzonspor lost the first leg 0–1 at Anfield. They would go on to lose the second leg 1–2, and were knocked out of the competition by a score of 1–3 on aggregate. Trabzonspor signed A2 defender Mert Ege Özeren to a three-year deal on 23 August following Arkadiusz Głowacki's injury. Trabzonspor played their first derby of the year when they faced Fenerbahçe on 23 August 2010. The Black Sea club struck first in the 14th minute, adding two more goals over a 15-minute span. Fenerbahçe scored two goals, but were unable to score a third in the second half. The win pushed Trabzonspor to the top of the table after two rounds, tied on points with Bursaspor and Kayserispor. The club closed out the month with a love-love draw against Antalyaspor on 30 August. Teófilo Gutiérrez was voted player of the month for August by TrabzonCell subscribers. The prolific goalscorer netted six goals in all competitions for the month of August.

=== September ===
The club hit the first international break having played five matches in a 15-day span. A friendly against Giresunspor was organized and played on 4 September. The match finished 2–1 in Trabzonspor's favour, with Engin Baytar and Umut Bulut providing both goals. The club restarted the league season with a 6–1 win over regional rivals Sivasspor. Ibrahim Yattara and Teófilo Gutiérrez bagged a brace each, while Selçuk İnan and Burak Yılmaz filled out the scorers' sheet. Trabzonspor travel once during the month of September to face Kayserispor.

=== October ===
Trabzonspor play four matches in the month of October, with two at home and two on the road. They opened up the month against Beşiktaş at home, winning one to nil. Mustafa Yumlu provided the lone goal of the match in his first appearance for the club. The club travel to Istanbul to face Kasımpaşa, before going back home a week later to face Gençlerbirliği. They close the month out in Konya to face Konyaspor on 31 October.

=== November ===
The club continue the same schedule of two home and two away matches in November, starting off with a home match against Galatasaray. Trabzonspor will then travel to face league champions Bursaspor, whom they bested earlier in the season with a three to nil win in the 2010 Turkish Super Cup. The club go back home to face Eskişehirspor, before traveling to face Gaziantepspor.

=== December ===
Having won the Turkish Cup the previous year, Trabzonspor will begin their quest for a repeat in the group stages of the 2010–11 Turkish Cup. The club is automatically seed first in one of four groups, along with clubs who placed first to third in the league (or first to fourth, if the Turkish Cup winner finishes in the top three). Trabzonspor, along with Bursaspor, Fenerbahçe, and Galatasaray, will be drawn into separate groups and will be joined by sixteen clubs who progress past the play-off round.

== Match results ==
=== Süper Lig ===
15 August 2010	Ankaragücü	0–2	Trabzonspor	Ankara, Turkey
		Report	Teó 70', 81'	Stadium: 19 Mayıs; Referee: Cüneyt Çakır

23 August 2010	Trabzonspor	3–2	Fenerbahçe	Trabzon, Turkey
	Topuz 14' (o.g.); Yattara 16'; Głowacki 29'	Report	Lugano 28'; Topuz 42'	Stadium: Hüseyin Avni Aker; Referee: Bünyamin Gezer

30 August 2010	Antalyaspor	0–0	Trabzonspor	Antalya, Turkey
		Report		Stadium: Mardan; Referee: Hüseyin Göçek

12 September 2010	Trabzonspor	6–1	Sivasspor	Trabzon, Turkey
	Yattara 31', 34'; Selçuk 38'; Teó 59', 75'; Burak 89'	Report	Cihan 47'	Stadium: Hüseyin Avni Aker; Referee: Bülent Yıldırım

19 September 2010	Trabzonspor	1–3	Manisaspor	Trabzon, Turkey
	Selçuk 9'		Makukula 41', 64'; Simpson 45'	Stadium: Hüseyin Avni Aker; Referee: Kamil Abitoğlu

26 September 2010	Kayserispor	0–0	Trabzonspor	Kayseri, Turkey
		Report		Stadium: Kadir Has; Referee: Bünyamin Gezer

3 October 2010	Trabzonspor	1–0	Beşiktaş	Trabzon, Turkey
	Mustafa 51'	Report		Stadium: Hüseyin Avni Aker; Referee: Kuddusi Müftüoğlu

17 October 2010	Kasımpaşa	0–7	Trabzonspor	Istanbul, Turkey
		Report	Alanzinho 2'; Burak 33', 46'; Umut 44', 80'; Jajá 66', 83'	Stadium: Recep Tayyip Erdoğan; Referee: Suat Arslanboğa

24 October 2010	Trabzonspor	3–1	Gençlerbirliği	Trabzon, Turkey
	Burak 68'; Jajá 72'; Umut 81'	Report	Serkan 32'	Stadium: Hüseyin Avni Aker; Referee: Cüneyt Çakır

31 October 2010	Konyaspor	1–2	Trabzonspor	Konya, Turkey
	Erdinç 29'		Umut 34'; Egemen 70'	Stadium: Konya Atatürk

7 November 2010	Trabzonspor	2–0	Galatasaray	Trabzon, Turkey
	Umut 70', 90'			Stadium: Hüseyin Avni Aker

14 November 2010	Bursaspor	0–2	Trabzonspor	Bursa, Turkey
			Jajá 5', 16'	Stadium: Bursa Atatürk

21 November 2010	Trabzonspor	0–0	Eskişehirspor	Trabzon, Turkey
				Stadium: Hüseyin Avni Aker

28 November 2010	Gaziantepspor	1–3	Trabzonspor	Gaziantep, Turkey
	Güngör 3'		Burak 30', 40'; Jajá 75'	Stadium: Gaziantep Kamil Ocak

5 December 2010	Trabzonspor	2–0	Bucaspor	Trabzon, Turkey
	Umut 6', 77'			Stadium: Hüseyin Avni Aker

12 December 2010	İstanbul B.B.	1–3	Trabzonspor	Istanbul, Turkey
	Tum 39'		Burak 2', 73'; Umut 76'	Stadium: Atatürk Olympic

18 December 2010	Trabzonspor	3–0	Karabükspor	Trabzon, Turkey
	Aktürk 83' (o.g.); Baytar 90'; Burak 90+3'			Stadium: Hüseyin Avni Aker

23 January 2011	Trabzonspor	1–1	Ankaragücü	Trabzon, Turkey
				Stadium: Hüseyin Avni Aker

=== Turkish Cup ===
21 December 2010	Trabzonspor	2–2	Gaziantep B.B	Trabzon, Turkey
	Balcı 13'; Umut 42'		Fırat 20'; Deliktaş 87'	Stadium: Hüseyin Avni Aker

11 January 2011	Konya Şeker	1–3	Trabzonspor	Konya, Turkey
	Cafercan 51'		Burak 16'; Yattara 19'; Umut 90+1'

16 January 2011	Trabzonspor	3–1	Manisaspor	Trabzon, Turkey
	Umut 15'; Jajá 40', 71'		Gökoğlan 3'	Stadium: Hüseyin Avni Aker

26 January 2011	Beşiktaş	2–1	Trabzonspor	Istanbul, Turkey
				Stadium: BJK İnönü Stadium

=== Turkish Super Cup ===
7 August 2010	Bursaspor	0–3	Trabzonspor	Istanbul, Turkey
		Report	Gutiérrez 55', 62', 71'	Stadium: Atatürk Olympic Stadium; Referee: Kuddusi Müftüoğlu (Turkey)

=== UEFA Europa League ===
19 August 2010	Liverpool	1–0	Trabzonspor	Liverpool, England
	Babel 45+1'	Report		Stadium: Anfield; Referee: Thomas Einwaller (Austria)

26 August 2010	Trabzonspor	1–2	Liverpool	Trabzon, Turkey
	Teó 4'	Report	Giray 83' (o.g.); Kuyt 88'	Stadium: Hüseyin Avni Aker Stadium; Referee: Ivan Bebek (Croatia)

=== Friendlies ===
9 July 2010	Trabzonspor	0–0	Gaziantepspor	Isparta, Turkey
		Report		Stadium: Davras Sirene Mountain Resort Field

14 July 2010	FC Wegberg-Beeck	0–5	Trabzonspor	Wegberg, Germany
		Report	Gabrić 61'; Umut 71'; Ceyhun 78'; Mustafa 82'; Alanzinho 87'	Stadium: Waldstadion Beeck

15 July 2010	Trabzonspor	0–1	F.C. Porto	Krefeld, Germany
		Report	Souza 32'	Stadium: Grotenburg Stadion

17 July 2010	Fortuna Köln	0–5	Trabzonspor	Cologne, Germany
		Report	Burak 35', 60'; Murat 56'; Sezer 79'; Egemen 90'	Stadium: Bezirkssportanlage Köln-Süd

21 July 2010	Trabzonspor	0–1	Standard Liège	Hasselt, Belgium
		Report	Carcela-Gonzalez 58'

25 July 2010	Genk	0–1	Trabzonspor	Genk, Belgium
		Report	Gutiérrez 23'	Stadium: Cristal Arena

29 July 2010	Fortuna Sittard	0–1	Trabzonspor	Sittard, Netherlands
		Report	Umut 61'	Stadium: Trendwork Arena

4 September 2010	Trabzonspor	2–0	Giresunspor	Trabzon, Turkey
		Report		Stadium: Mehmet Ali Yılmaz Facilities; Referee: Abdullah Yılmaz

5 January 2011	Trabzonspor	1–1	Werder Bremen	Trabzon, Turkey
	Umut 5'		Pizarro 41'

7 January 2011	Trabzonspor	3–0	Schalke 04	Trabzon, Turkey
	Cora 10'; Umut 57'; Burak 77'

== Tables ==
=== Süper Lig ===
Pos	Team	Pld	W	D	L	GF	GA	GD	Pts	Qualification or relegation
1	Fenerbahçe (C)	34	26	4	4	84	34	+50	82	
2	Trabzonspor	34	25	7	2	69	23	+46	82	Qualification to Champions League group stage (Note: Originally, Fenerbahçe qualified for the group stage and Trabzonspor qualified for the third qualifying round. Despite being eliminated in the third qualifying round and passed to the UEFA Europa League play-off round, Trabzonspor replaced Fenerbahçe after the Turkish Football Federation withdrew Fenerbahçe from the UEFA Champions League one day before the group stage draw due to match-fixing allegations. UEFA would then select Trabzonspor as their replacement.)
3	Bursaspor	34	17	10	7	50	29	+21	61	Qualification to Europa League third qualifying round
4	Gaziantepspor	34	17	8	9	44	33	+11	59	Qualification to Europa League second qualifying round
5	Beşiktaş	34	15	9	10	53	36	+17	54	Qualification to Europa League play-off round (Note: Beşiktaş have won the 2010–11 Turkish Cup competition and thus are qualified for the play-off round of the UEFA Europa League.)

Source: tff.org (in Turkish)
Rules for classification: 1) points; 2) goal difference; 3) number of goals scored.
(C) Champions

=== Turkish Cup ===
Pos	Team	Pld	W	D	L	GF	GA	GD	Pts	BEŞ	GBB	TRA	KON	MAN
1	Beşiktaş	4	3	0	1	8	6	+2	9			2–1	3–2	
2	Gaziantep B.B.	4	2	2	0	7	5	+2	8	1–0			2–2	
3	Trabzonspor	4	2	1	1	9	6	+3	7		2–2			3–1
4	Konya Torku Şekerspor	4	1	1	2	7	9	−2	4			1–3		2–1
5	Manisaspor	4	0	0	4	5	10	−5	0	2–3	1–2			

Source: tff.org (in Turkish)
Rules for classification: 1) points; 2) goal difference; 3) number of goals scored.

== Squad statistics ==
No.	Pos.	Name	League		Cup		Europe		Total		Discipline	
No.	Pos.	Name	Apps	Goals	Apps	Goals	Apps	Goals	Apps	Goals	Yellow card	Red card
2	DF	Mert Ege Özeren	0	0	0	0	0	0	0	0	0	0
3	DF	Hrvoje Čale	7	0	1	0	2	0	10	0	5	0
4	DF	Arkadiusz Głowacki	2	1	1	0	1	0	4	1	0	0
5	MF	Engin Baytar	2 (1)	0	0	0	0	0	2 (1)	0	0	0
6	MF	Ceyhun Gülselam	4 (4)	0	1	0	2	0	7 (4)	0	4	0
8	MF	Selçuk İnan	9	2	1	0	2	0	12	2	2	0
9	FW	Teófilo Gutiérrez	6	4	1	3	2	1	9	8	1	1
10	FW	Umut Bulut	4 (3)	3	0	0	1	0	5 (3)	3	0	0
16	DF	Egemen Korkmaz	9	0	1	0	2	0	12	0	5	0
17	FW	Burak Yılmaz	5 (3)	3	1	0	2	0	8 (3)	3	1	0
18	DF	Tayfun Cora	0	0	0	0	0	0	0	0	0	0
20	MF	Gustavo Colman	9	0	1	0	2	0	12	0	3	0
21	MF	Barış Ataş	0 (7)	0	0 (1)	0	0 (1)	0	0 (9)	0	1	0
22	DF	Mustafa Yumlu	3	1	0	0	0	0	3	1	0	0
23	DF	Giray Kaçar	4 (1)	0	0 (1)	0	1 (1)	0	5 (3)	0	0	0
25	MF	Alanzinho	6 (2)	2	1	0	0 (2)	0	7 (4)	2	0	0
26	MF	Sezer Badur	0 (1)	0	0	0	0	0	0 (1)	0	0	0
29	GK	Tolga Zengin	0	0	0	0	0	0	0	0	0	0
30	DF	Serkan Balcı	9	0	1	0	2	0	12	0	4	0
35	GK	Onur Kıvrak	9	0	1	0	2	0	12	0	1	0
45	GK	Yakup Bugun	0	0	0	0	0	0	0	0	0	0
50	FW	Jajá	3 (2)	3	0	0	0 (1)	0	3 (3)	3	0	0
61	MF	Ibrahim Yattara	5 (2)	3	0 (1)	0	1 (1)	0	6 (4)	3	0	0
66	DF	Ferhat Öztorun	2 (1)	0	0	0	0	0	2 (1)	0	1	0
91	GK	Bora Sevim	0	0	0	0	0	0	0	0	0	0

== Transfers ==
=== In ===
Date	Pos.	Name	From	Fee
10 June 2010	GK	Bora Sevim	Gaziantep B.B.	Undisclosed
15 June 2010	DF	Arkadiusz Głowacki	Wisla Krakow	€1m
22 June 2010	MF	Barış Ataş	Diyarbakırspor	Free
9 August 2010	FW	Jajá	FC Metalist Kharkiv	€4.2m
17 August 2010	GK	Volkan Ünlü	MVV	Undisclosed
23 August 2010	DF	Mert Ege Özeren	Youth system	Free

- Total spending: ▼€5.2 million

=== Out ===
Date	Pos.	Name	To	Fee
1 June 2010	GK	Tony Sylva	Unattached	Free transfer (end of contract)
1 June 2010	DF	Rigobert Song	Unattached	Free transfer (end of contract)
1 June 2010	FW	Isaac Promise	Unattached	Free transfer (end of contract)
2 July 2010	MF	Razundara Tjikuzu	Unattached	Free transfer (contract terminated)
29 July 2010	FW	Eren Görür	Unattached	Free transfer (contract terminated)
29 July 2010	FW	Abdullah Karmil	Unattached	Free transfer (contract terminated)
16 August 2010	DF	İsmail Özeren	Bugsaş Spor	Undisclosed

- Total income: ▲€0 million
- Turnover: ▼€5.2 million

=== Loans out ===
Date	Pos.	Name	To	End date
17 August 2010	GK	Volkan Ünlü	1461 Trabzon	31 May 2011
20 August 2010	FW	Murat Tosun	Konyaspor	31 May 2011
1 September 2010	MF	Drago Gabrić	MKE Ankaragücü	31 May 2011
1 September 2010	MF	Barış Memiş	Karşıyaka	31 May 2011

== See also ==
- List of Trabzonspor seasons
