= 2007–08 Trabzonspor season =

Trabzonspor
2007–08 season
- President: Nuri Albayrak
- Manager: Ziya Doğan; Ersun Yanal
- Stadium: Hüseyin Avni Aker Stadium
- Süper Lig: 6th
- Turkish Cup: Group stage
- UEFA Intertoto Cup: Third round
- Top goalscorer: League: Umut Bulut (14); All: Umut Bulut (19)

In the 2007–08 season, Trabzonspor finished in sixth place in the Süper Lig. The top scorer of the team was Umut Bulut, who scored nineteen goals.

This article shows statistics on the club's players and matches during the season.

== Sponsor ==
- Avea

== Players ==
Note: Flags indicate national team as defined under FIFA eligibility rules; some limited exceptions apply. Players may hold more than one non-FIFA nationality.

| No. | Pos. | Nation | Player |
|---|---|---|---|
| 1 | GK | BRA | Jefferson de Oliveira Galvão |
| 29 | GK | TUR | Tolga Zengin |
| 77 | GK | TUR | Ahmet Şahin |
| 89 | GK | TUR | Zeki Ayvaz |
| 3 | DF | TUR | Ufukhan Bayraktar |
| 2 | DF | SWE | Fredrik Risp |
| 4 | DF | TUR | Çağdaş Atan |
| 15 | DF | GUI | Daouda Jabi |
| 18 | DF | TUR | Tayfun Cora |
| 32 | DF | TUR | Mustafa Keçeli |
| 38 | DF | TUR | Erdinç Yavuz |
| 28 | DF | TUR | Tolga Seyhan |
| 85 | DF | TUR | Ferhat Çökmüş |
| 99 | DF | TUR | Celaleddin Koçak |
| 5 | MF | TUR | Hüseyin Çimşir (kaptan) |

| No. | Pos. | Nation | Player |
|---|---|---|---|
| 6 | MF | TUR | Hasan Üçüncü |
| 12 | MF | EGY | Ayman Abdelaziz |
| 13 | MF | TUR | Adnan Güngör |
| 16 | MF | TUR | Musa Büyük |
| 20 | MF | TUR | Ceyhun Eriş |
| 30 | MF | TUR | Serkan Balcı |
| 61 | MF | TUR | Gökdeniz Karadeniz |
| 19 | MF | TUR | Kadir Keleş |
| 17 | MF | TUR | Ufuk Bayraktar |
| 11 | MF | GUI | Ibrahima Yattara |
| 7 | MF | TUR | Barış Memiş |
| 27 | FW | TUR | Ersen Martin |
| 10 | FW | TUR | Umut Bulut |
| 9 | FW | CMR | Gustave Bebbe |
| 8 | FW | TUR | Omer Riza |
| 21 | FW | GUI | Souleymane Youla |

== Süper Lig ==
| Pos | Team | Pld | W | D | L | GF | GA | GD | Pts | Qualification or relegation |
|---|---|---|---|---|---|---|---|---|---|---|
| 4 | Sivasspor | 34 | 23 | 4 | 7 | 57 | 29 | +28 | 73 (Note: Fenerbahçe were ahead of Beşiktaş and Sivasspor on head-to-head points and Beşiktaş were ahead of Sivasspor on head-to-head goal difference: Fenerbahçe: 12 pts; Beşiktaş: 3 pts, 5–7 (–2); Sivasspor: 3 pts, 4–8 (–4).) | Qualification to Intertoto Cup second round |
| 5 | Kayserispor | 34 | 15 | 10 | 9 | 50 | 31 | +19 | 55 | Qualification to UEFA Cup first round (Note: Kayserispor have won the 2007–08 Turkish Cup competition and thus are qualified for the first round of the UEFA Cup.) |
| 6 | Trabzonspor | 34 | 14 | 7 | 13 | 44 | 39 | +5 | 49 | |
| 7 | Denizlispor | 34 | 13 | 6 | 15 | 48 | 48 | 0 | 45 | |
| 8 | MKE Ankaragücü | 34 | 11 | 10 | 13 | 36 | 44 | −8 | 43 (Note: Ankaragücü were ahead of Gaziantepspor on head-to-head away goals scored: Gaziantepspor–Ankaragücü 2–1, Ankaragücü–Gaziantepspor 1–0.) | |

Rules for classification: 1) points; 2) goal difference; 3) number of goals scored.

== Turkish Cup ==
| Pos | Team | Pld | W | D | L | GF | GA | GD | Pts | GEN | ADA | TRA | MAN | KRK |
|---|---|---|---|---|---|---|---|---|---|---|---|---|---|---|
| 1 | Gençlerbirliği S.K. | 4 | 3 | 0 | 1 | 10 | 3 | +7 | 9 | | 1–0 | | 3–0 | |
| 2 | Adana Demirspor | 4 | 3 | 0 | 1 | 6 | 3 | +3 | 9 | | | 1–0 | 2–1 | |
| 3 | Trabzonspor | 4 | 2 | 0 | 2 | 8 | 6 | +2 | 6 | 3–2 | | | | 5–0 |
| 4 | Manisaspor | 4 | 2 | 0 | 2 | 6 | 6 | 0 | 6 | | | 3–0 | | 2–1 |
| 5 | Kırıkkalespor | 4 | 0 | 0 | 4 | 2 | 14 | −12 | 0 | 0–4 | 1–3 | | | |

Legend: Blue = home team win; Yellow = draw; Red = away team win.

== See also ==
- 2007–08 Süper Lig
- 2007–08 Turkish Cup
