= 2006–07 Trabzonspor season =

Trabzonspor
2006–07 season
- President: Nuri Albayrak
- Manager: Sebastião Lazaroni; Ziya Doğan
- Stadium: Hüseyin Avni Aker Stadium
- Süper Lig: 4th
- Turkish Cup: Semi-finals
- UEFA Cup: First round
- Top goalscorer: League: Umut Bulut (15); All: Umut Bulut (20)

In the 2006–07 season, Trabzonspor finished in fourth place in the Süper Lig, and qualified for European football for the UEFA Intertoto Cup. The top scorer of the team was Umut Bulut, who scored twenty goals.

This article shows statistics of the club's players and matches during the season.

== Sponsor ==
- Avea

== Players ==
Note: Flags indicate national team as defined under FIFA eligibility rules; some limited exceptions apply. Players may hold more than one non-FIFA nationality.

No.	Pos.	Nation	Player
1	GK	BRA	Jefferson de Oliveira Galvão
29	GK	TUR	Tolga Zengin
77	GK	TUR	Ahmet Şahin
2	MF	TUR	Feridun Sungur
14	DF	TUR	Fatih Akyel
4	DF	TUR	Çağdaş Atan
13	DF	TUR	Ufukhan Bayraktar
22	DF	TUR	Murat Ocak
32	DF	TUR	Mustafa Keçeli
33	DF	SWE	Fredrik Risp
38	DF	TUR	Erdinç Yavuz
3	DF	SRB	Milan Stepanov
85	DF	TUR	Ferhat Çökmüş
99	DF	TUR	Celaleddin Koçak

No.	Pos.	Nation	Player
25	MF	TUR	Enis Kahraman
5	MF	TUR	Hüseyin Çimşir
6	MF	TUR	Hasan Üçüncü
12	MF	EGY	Ayman Abdelaziz
16	MF	TUR	Musa Büyük
20	MF	TUR	Ceyhun Eriş
9	MF	BRA	Marcelinho
61	MF	TUR	Gökdeniz Karadeniz
15	MF	NED	Kiki Musampa
7	MF	POL	Mirosław Szymkowiak
11	FW	GUI	Ibrahim Yattara
10	FW	TUR	Umut Bulut
8	FW	TUR	Omer Riza
21	FW	TUR	Cem Demir
23	FW	TUR	Ersen Martin

== Süper Lig ==
Pos	Team	Pld	W	D	L	GF	GA	GD	Pts	Qualification or relegation
2	Beşiktaş	34	18	7	9	43	32	+11	61	Qualification to Champions League second qualifying round
3	Galatasaray	34	15	11	8	58	37	+21	56	Qualification to UEFA Cup second qualifying round
4	Trabzonspor	34	15	7	12	54	44	+10	52	Qualification to Intertoto Cup second round
5	Kayserispor	34	13	12	9	54	43	+11	51	
6	Gençlerbirliği	34	14	6	14	43	42	+1	48 (Note: Gençlerbirliği were ahead of Sivasspor on head-to-head away goals scored: Gençlerbirliği–Sivasspor 0–1, Sivasspor–Gençlerbirliği 1–2.)	

Source: Süper Lig
Rules for classification: 1) points; 2) goal difference; 3) number of goals scored.

== Turkish Cup ==
Pos	Team	Pld	W	D	L	GF	GA	GD	Pts	MAN	TRA	KON	ESK	ANK
1	Vestel Manisaspor	4	2	1	1	9	4	+5	7		1–1		6–1	
2	Trabzonspor	4	1	3	0	7	4	+3	6			1–1	5–2	
3	Konyaspor	4	1	2	1	7	7	0	5	1–0				2–2
4	Eskişehirspor	4	1	1	2	7	14	−7	4			4–3		0–0
5	Ankaraspor	4	0	3	1	3	4	−1	3	1–2	0–0			

Source: TFF.org
Legend: Blue = home team win; Yellow = draw; Red = away team win.

Team #1	Agg.	Team #2	1st leg	2nd leg
Trabzonspor	2–1	Gaziantepspor	1–0	1–1

Team #1	Agg.	Team #2	1st leg	2nd leg
Trabzonspor	1–2	Kayseri Erciyesspor	0–1	1–1 (5–4 on penalties)

== See also ==
- 2006–07 Süper Lig
- 2006–07 Turkish Cup
