= 2008–09 Trabzonspor season =

Trabzonspor
2008–09 season
- President: Sadri Sener
- Manager: Ersun Yanal; Ahmet Özen
- Stadium: Hüseyin Avni Aker Stadium
- Süper Lig: 3rd
- Turkish Cup: Group stage
- Top goalscorer: League: Gökhan Ünal (15); All: Gökhan Ünal (16)

In the 2008–09 season, Trabzonspor finished in third place in the Süper Lig. The top scorer of the team was Gökhan Ünal, who scored sixteen goals.

This article shows statistics of the club's players and matches during the season.

== Sponsor ==
- Avea

== Players ==
Note: Flags indicate national team as defined under FIFA eligibility rules; some limited exceptions apply. Players may hold more than one non-FIFA nationality.

No.	Pos.	Nation	Player
1	GK	SEN	Tony Sylva
29	GK	TUR	Tolga Zengin
35	GK	TUR	Onur Kıvrak
19	MF	TUR	Buğra Erdoğan
3	DF	CRO	Hrvoje Čale
4	DF	CMR	Rigobert Song
6	DF	TUR	Ceyhun Gülselam
16	DF	TUR	Egemen Korkmaz
18	DF	TUR	Tayfun Cora
23	DF	TUR	Giray Kaçar
30	MF	TUR	Serkan Balcı
85	DF	TUR	Ferhat Çökmüş

No.	Pos.	Nation	Player
5	MF	TUR	Hüseyin Çimşir
8	MF	TUR	Selçuk İnan
11	FW	GUI	Ibrahim Yattara
13	MF	TUR	Adnan Güngör
22	MF	TUR	Göksu Alhas
20	MF	ARG	Gustavo Colman
21	MF	TUR	Kadir Keleş
25	MF	BRA	Alanzinho
61	MF	TUR	Barış Memiş
9	FW	TUR	Gökhan Ünal
10	FW	TUR	Umut Bulut
14	FW	NGA	Isaac Promise

== Süper Lig ==
Pos	Team	Pld	W	D	L	GF	GA	GD	Pts	Qualification or relegation
1	Beşiktaş (C)	34	21	8	5	60	30	+30	71	Qualification to Champions League group stage
2	Sivasspor	34	19	9	6	54	28	+26	66	Qualification to Champions League third qualifying round
3	Trabzonspor	34	19	8	7	54	34	+20	65	Qualification to Europa League play-off round
4	Fenerbahçe	34	18	7	9	60	36	+24	61	Qualification to Europa League third qualifying round
5	Galatasaray	34	18	7	9	57	39	+18	61	Qualification to Europa League second qualifying round (Note: 2008–09 Turkish Cup was won by Champions League-qualified side Beşiktaş. Since cup runners-up Fenerbahçe secured a place in the European competitions via league position, the spot allocation for the 2009–10 UEFA Europa League effectively reverted to league positions.)

Rules for classification: 1st points; 2nd head-to-head points; 3rd head-to-head goal difference; 4th head-to-head goals scored; 5th head-to-head away goals scored; 6th goal difference; 7th goals scored
(C) Champions

== Turkish Cup ==
Team 1	Score	Team 2
İstanbulspor A.Ş.	0–1	Ankaraspor
İskenderun Demir Çelikspor	1–5	Kayserispor
Beykozspor	0–1	Altay
Alanyaspor	2–1	Gençlerbirliği
Malatyaspor	1–0	Hacettepespor
Manisaspor	4–1	Kocaelispor
Çaykur Rizespor	0–2	Gaziantepspor
Konyaspor	1–0	Güngören Belediyespor
Bursaspor	3–0	Belediye Vanspor
MKE Ankaragücü	5–1	Giresunspor
Eskişehirspor	2–0	Diyarbakırspor
Samsunspor	1–1 (aet, p. 7–8)	Antalyaspor
Trabzonspor	2–0	Kardemir Karabükspor
İstanbul B.Ş.B. Spor	1–2	Tokatspor
Denizlispor	4–0	Sakaryaspor
Gaziantep B.Ş.B Spor	2–0	Kayseri Erciyesspor

Pos	Team	Pld	W	D	L	GF	GA	GD	Pts	BEŞ	ANT	GAZ	TRA	GBB
1	Beşiktaş	4	4	0	0	9	2	+7	12		3–0			3–1
2	Antalyaspor	4	2	1	1	8	6	+2	7			2–0	3–3	
3	Gaziantepspor	4	2	0	2	6	5	+1	6	0–1			3–1	
4	Trabzonspor	4	1	1	2	6	8	−2	4	1–2				1–0
5	Gaziantep BB	4	0	0	4	2	10	−8	0		0–3	1–3		

Source: tff.org (in Turkish)
Legend: Blue = home team win; Yellow = draw; Red = away team win.
Rules for classification: 1) points; 2) goal difference; 3) number of goals scored.

== See also ==
- 2008–09 Süper Lig
- 2008–09 Turkish Cup
