= List of Trabzonspor seasons =

The following table is a season-by-season summary of league performances for Trabzonspor.

== Season ==
Results											Domestic		Continental			Top Scorer(s)	
Season	League	Pos.	M	W	D	L	GF	GA	GD	P	ZTC	TSC	UCL	UEL	UCL (Note: Includes UEFA Cup Winners' Cup)	Player	Goals
1966–67	1. Lig	8th	30	10	10	10	30	30	0	30	R3	–	–	–	–	Selahattin Şahinkaya	6
1967–68	1. Lig	6th	38	17	11	10	45	35	+10	45	R1	–	–	–	–	Necmi Perekli	10
1968–69	1. Lig	4th	34	16	7	11	39	30	+9	39	–	–	–	–	–	Necmi Perekli	20
1969–70	1. Lig	4th	30	15	6	9	36	28	+8	36	R2	–	–	–	–	Necmi Perekli	21
1970–71	1. Lig	8th	30	11	9	10	31	29	+2	31	–	–	–	–	–	Necmi Perekli	7
1971–72	1. Lig	2nd	30	15	7	8	37	25	+12	37	–	–	–	–	–	Necmi Perekli	10
1972–73	1. Lig	2nd	30	14	11	5	39	24	+15	39	R1	–	–	–	–	Suavi Tanlak	6
1973–74	1. Lig	1st↑	30	19	9	2	47	18	+29	47	QF	–	–	–	–	İhsan Sakallıoğlu	11
1974–75	Süper Lig	9th	30	9	12	9	19	17	+2	30	RU	–	–	–	–	Hüseyin Tok	14
1975–76	Süper Lig	1st	30	17	9	4	36	14	+22	43	W	W	–	–	–	Hüseyin Tok	25
1976–77	Süper Lig	1st	30	18	7	5	41	12	+29	43	W	W	R2	–	–	Necmi Perekli	21
1977–78	Süper Lig	2nd	30	18	5	7	42	16	+26	41	W	W	R1	–	–	Cengiz Akçay	11
1978–79	Süper Lig	1st	30	13	16	1	34	7	+27	42	R6	–	R1	–	–	Orhan Akyüz	10
1979–80	Süper Lig	1st	30	12	15	3	25	11	+14	39	QF	–	R1	–	–	Serdar Bali	8
1980–81	Süper Lig	1st	30	16	7	7	41	21	+20	43	R5	–	R1	–	–	Sinan Ünal	13
1981–82	Süper Lig	2nd	32	14	15	3	26	11	+15	43	QF	–	R1	–	–	Hüsnü Özkara	7
1982–83	Süper Lig	2nd	34	17	13	4	40	19	+21	47	SF	–	R1	–	–	Levent Erköse	13
1983–84	Süper Lig	1st	34	18	14	2	43	14	+29	50	W	W	R1	–	–	Hasan Şengün	17
1984–85	Süper Lig	3rd	34	14	14	6	38	26	+12	42	RU	–	–	–	–	Tuncay Soyak	14
1985–86	Süper Lig	7th	36	12	13	11	37	27	+10	37	R6	–	–	–	–	Hasan Şengün	10
1986–87	Süper Lig	4th	36	18	13	5	49	21	+28	49	QF	–	–	–	–	Hasan Vezir	12
1987–88	Süper Lig	6th	38	16	9	13	57	51	+6	41	R4	–	–	–	–	Hami Mandıralı	20
1988–89	Süper Lig	5th	36	19	7	10	59	38	+21	45	R4	–	–	–	–	Hami Mandıralı	24
1989–90	Süper Lig	3rd	34	20	8	6	58	28	+30	48	RU	–	–	–	–	Hamdi Aslan	17
1990–91	Süper Lig	3rd	30	14	9	7	55	37	+18	51	SF	–	–	–	–	Hami Mandıralı	19
1991–92	Süper Lig	4th	30	16	7	7	56	31	+25	55	W	–	–	R32	–	Hami Mandıralı	27
1992–93	Süper Lig	3rd	30	17	9	4	57	27	+30	60	SF	–	–	–	–	Orhan Çıkırıkçı	18
1993–94	Süper Lig	3rd	30	17	8	5	67	28	+39	59	SF	–	–	–	–	Shota Arveladze	31
1994–95	Süper Lig	2nd	34	23	7	4	80	28	+52	76	W	–	–	–	R32	Orhan Kaynak	24
1995–96	Süper Lig	2nd	34	26	4	4	79	24	+55	82	QF	–	–	R2	–	Shota Arveladze	30
1996–97	Süper Lig	3rd	34	22	6	6	73	33	+40	72	RU	–	–	L32	–	Hami Mandıralı	29
1997–98	Süper Lig	3rd	34	19	9	6	68	42	+26	66	SF	–	–	R1	–	Hami Mandıralı	25
1998–99	Süper Lig	4th	34	17	7	10	48	37	+11	58	R6	–	–	–	–	Davor Vugrinec	16
1999–2000	Süper Lig	6th	34	15	8	11	47	41	+6	53	QF	–	–	–	–	Hami Mandıralı	17
2000–01	Süper Lig	5th	34	17	7	10	69	52	+17	58	QF	–	–	–	–	Hami Mandıralı	19
2001–02	Süper Lig	14th	34	11	7	16	49	60	-11	40	QF	–	–	–	–	Robson Carioca	11
2002–03	Süper Lig	7th	34	13	12	9	44	33	+11	51	W	–	–	–	–	Fatih Tekke	17
2003–04	Süper Lig	2nd	34	22	6	6	60	38	+22	72	W	–	–	R1	–	Gökdeniz Karadeniz	17
2004–05	Süper Lig	2nd	34	24	5	5	73	29	+44	77	SF	–	3QR	R2	–	Fatih Tekke	34
2005–06	Süper Lig	4th	34	15	7	12	51	42	+9	52	GS	–	2QR	–	–	Fatih Tekke	26
2006–07	Süper Lig	4th	34	15	7	12	54	55	+10	52	SF	–	–	–	–	Umut Bulut	20
2007–08	Süper Lig	6th	34	14	7	13	44	39	+5	49	GS	–	–	–	–	Umut Bulut	17
2008–09	Süper Lig	3rd	34	19	8	7	54	34	+20	65	GS	–	–	–	–	Gökhan Ünal	16
2009–10	Süper Lig	5th	34	16	9	9	53	32	+21	57	W	–	–	–	–	Umut Bulut	18
2010–11	Süper Lig	2nd	34	25	7	2	69	23	+46	82	GS	W	–	PO	–	Burak Yılmaz	20
2011–12	Süper Lig	3rd	34	15	11	8	60	39	+21	56	R4	–	GS (Note: Trabzonspor replaced Fenerbahçe in the UEFA Champions League group stage after Fenerbahçe was withdrawn by the TFF due to match-fixing allegations. Despite being eliminated in the third qualifying round, Trabzonspor was selected by UEFA as their replacement.)	L32	–	Burak Yılmaz	35
2012–13	Süper Lig	9th	34	13	7	14	39	40	-1	46	RU	–	–	PO	–	Adrian Mierzejewski	13
2013–14	Süper Lig	4th	34	14	11	9	53	41	+12	53	R4	–	–	L16	–	Paulo Henrique	21
2014–15	Süper Lig	5th	34	15	12	7	58	48	+10	57	L16	–	–	L32	–	Óscar Cardozo	20
2015–16	Süper Lig	12th	34	12	4	18	40	59	-19	40	L16	–	–	GS	–	Óscar Cardozo	8
2016–17	Süper Lig	6th	34	14	9	11	39	34	+5	51	GS	–	–	–	–	Dame N'Doye	8
2017–18	Süper Lig	5th	34	15	10	9	63	51	+12	55	L16	–	–	–	–	Burak Yılmaz	23
2018–19	Süper Lig	4th	34	18	9	7	64	46	+18	63	QF	–	–	–	–	Hugo Rodallega	16
2019–20	Süper Lig	2nd	34	18	11	5	76	42	+34	65	W	–	–	GS	–	Alexander Sørloth	33
2020–21	Süper Lig	4th	40	19	14	7	50	37	+13	71	R5	–	~~UEFA Ban (Note: On 3 June 2020, Trabzonspor was banned from UEFA competitions for one season due to FFP violations.)~~			Caleb Ekuban	11
2021–22	Süper Lig	1st	38	23	12	3	69	36	+33	81	SF	W	–	–	PO	Andreas Cornelius	17
2022–23	Süper Lig	6th	36	17	6	13	64	54	+10	57	QF	–	PO	GS	R16	Trézéguet	13
2023–24	Süper Lig	3rd	38	21	4	13	69	50	+19	67	RU	–	–	–	–	Paul Onuachu	17
2024–25	Süper Lig	7th	36	13	12	11	58	45	+13	51	RU	–	–	3QR	PO	Simon Banza	22
