= Teófilo Gutiérrez =

Colombian footballer (born 1985)

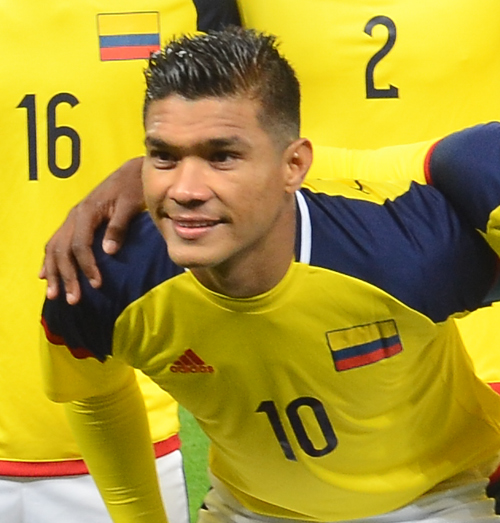
- Gutiérrez with Colombia at the 2016 Summer Olympics

Personal information
- Full name: Teófilo Antonio Gutiérrez Roncancio
- Date of birth: 17 May 1985 (age 41)
- Place of birth: Barranquilla, Atlántico, Colombia
- Height: 1.78 m (5 ft 10 in)
- Position: Forward

Team information
- Current team: Atlético Junior
- Number: 29

Senior career*
| Years | Team | Apps | (Gls) |
| 2006 | Barranquilla | 40 | (16) |
| 2007–2009 | Atlético Junior | 75 | (42) |
| 2010–2011 | Trabzonspor | 17 | (4) |
| 2011–2012 | Racing Club | 40 | (20) |
| 2012 | → Lanús (loan) | 0 | (0) |
| 2012 | → Atlético Junior (loan) | 18 | (5) |
| 2012–2013 | Cruz Azul | 21 | (6) |
| 2013–2015 | River Plate | 47 | (22) |
| 2015–2017 | Sporting CP | 23 | (11) |
| 2016–2017 | → Rosario Central (loan) | 21 | (5) |
| 2017–2021 | Atlético Junior | 129 | (30) |
| 2021–2022 | Deportivo Cali | 50 | (11) |
| 2023 | Atlético Bucaramanga | 13 | (0) |
| 2023 | Deportivo Cali | 17 | (3) |
| 2024 | Real Cartagena | 23 | (3) |
| 2025– | Atlético Junior | 49 | (6) |

International career^{‡}
| 2009–2017 | Colombia | 51 | (15) |
| 2016 | Colombia Olympic | 6 | (4) |
- * Club domestic league appearances and goals as of 9 April 2026 ‡ National team caps and goals as of 5 October 2017

Teófilo Antonio "Teo" Gutiérrez Roncancio (Spanish pronunciation: [teˈofilo ɣuˈtjeres]; born 17 May 1985) is a Colombian professional footballer who plays as a forward for Atlético Junior . He was a Colombian international and captained the country at the 2016 Summer Olympics in Brazil.

== Early life ==
Gutierrez grew up in the impoverished neighborhood of La Chinita in Barranquilla along with six brothers. The area is plagued with gang violence and many shootouts happened near his home.

== Club career ==
=== Barranquilla ===
Gutierrez began his career with Barranquilla F.C., Atlético Junior's second division team, in 2006. After scoring 16 goals in 28 appearances, he was called up to Junior's senior team in 2007.

=== Atlético Junior ===
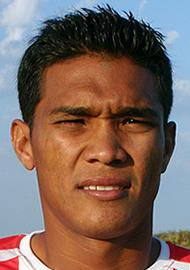
Teo on the training field of Atlético Junior in 2009

In his first years with the main squad, Gutiérrez found it difficult to break into the starting eleven. He managed to score his first goal on 2 September 2007 in a 4–2 victory against Once Caldas. During the 2008 Finalizacion, he earned a spot in the starting lineup and managed to score 11 goals, finishing third place in the scoring charts, just behind Freddy Montero and Carlos Quintero and tying Adrián Ramos and Milton Rodríguez.

During the 2009 Apertura, Gutiérrez was in outstanding form, scoring a total of 16 goals and winning the Golden Boot of the tournament. During the playoffs, he scored six goals with hat-tricks against Cúcuta Deportivo and Envigado. During the 2009 Finalización he finished the season with 14 goals, finishing second to Jackson Martínez's 18 goals.

He was named by the IFFHS as the fourth world First Division top scorer of 2009, having scored 30 goals during the year.

=== Trabzonspor ===
On 13 January 2010, Junior sold Gutierrez to Süper Lig club Trabzonspor for $3 million. During his first season in Turkey, he found it difficult to adapt, which prevented him from being a regular on the starting eleven. He played 11 league games and did not score any goals.

Gutierrez joined the team's preseason late due to visa problems, but began the season on a high note, scoring a hat trick in the 2010 Turkish Super Cup and earning the man of the match award; these were his first goals with the club. In his Super Lig debut, he scored two goals against Ankaragücü, and added two more in a 6–1 victory over Sivasspor on 13 September. He also scored his first Europa League goal against Liverpool on 26 August. In October, he moved to his country without Trabzonspor's permission claiming to have some health problems. However, doctors did not find any health problems after check-ups, and Trabzonspor terminated his contract later than month.

=== Racing Club ===
On 15 February 2011, Trabzonspor accepted a bid from Argentine side Racing Club worth around $2 million. He made his debut five days later in a defeat to Boca Juniors, and the following week he scored twice in a 2–1 victory over San Lorenzo. On 6 March, he scored and assisted Lucas Licht in a 4–3 victory against Club Olimpo. The following week, he added another two in a 4–0 victory against Colón, bringing his tally to five goals in three games. During a training session two weeks later, he got into a fight with goalkeeper Mauro Dobler, which was the beginning of his tense spell at the club. On 16 April, he scored and assisted in a 2–0 Avellaneda derby victory at Estadio Presidente Perón. On 14 May, he scored another brace in a 3–0 victory to Newell's Old Boys. The Colombian striker finalized his tally for the campaign with a brace in a home defeat to Godoy Cruz. He finished the 2011 Clausura with 11 goals in 16 games, winning the golden boot as the league's top scorer.

He began his second season in the club with a goal, in a 1–1 draw to Tigre on 8 August 2011. In the following matchday, he scored twice in a 3–0 victory against Godoy Cruz, despite missing a penalty kick. He scored the only goals against Olimpo, Newell's, and Atletico Rafaela, and finished the season with 6 goals in 15 matches.

Despite his desire to leave Racing at the end of 2011, he remained with the club despite turbulence with many of his teammates and Diego Simeone. After the Avellaneda derby on 14 April 2012, where he scored the opening goal but was eventually sent off in a 4–1 defeat, his teammate Sebastián Saja confronted him over being sent off, and they allegedly got into a fight. Shortly after, he threatened Saja and other teammates with a paintball gun in the locker room, and police had to intervene. Finally, the club decided to terminate his contract, and he left the club the following day.

=== Lanús and Junior loans ===
A few days after his untimely departure from Racing Club, Gutierrez signed a short-term loan contract with Lanús, for whom he would play in the Copa Libertadores. He made his debut for the club on 2 May 2012, coming on as a substitute in the Copa Libertadores round of 16 loss against Vasco da Gama at Estádio São Januário. He also played in the second leg a week later, where he scored a goal, but it was not enough as Lanús crashed out of the competition on penalties. His time at Lanús was cut-short after he left Argentina for his native Colombia without permission from the club, claiming that he was on international duty. When it was found out that he was not selected for the Colombia squad, Lanús cancelled his contract later that month.

A six-month loan to Junior was then arranged, but Los Tiburones, who had made a considerable effort in the transfer market to reclaim the Liga Postobón title, failed to reach the finals.

=== Cruz Azul ===
In December 2012, Gutiérrez was sold to Mexican side Cruz Azul and signed a three-year contract worth US$3 million, along with a salary of US$1.5 Million per year. Despite being used as a substitute of Argentine striker Mariano Pavone for most of the season, he managed to score important goals for Cruz Azul in the Liguilla while Pavone was injured, including one in the final against América, although his team lost on penalties after a 2–2 draw over two legs. After a six-month spell at Cruz Azul, Gutierrez said he wanted to leave to Argentinian side River Plate, even though he initially expressed his will to stay at the Mexican club. He was part of the squad that won the 2013 Copa MX Clausura, where he scored a crucial goal in the quarter final against Chiapas.

=== River Plate ===
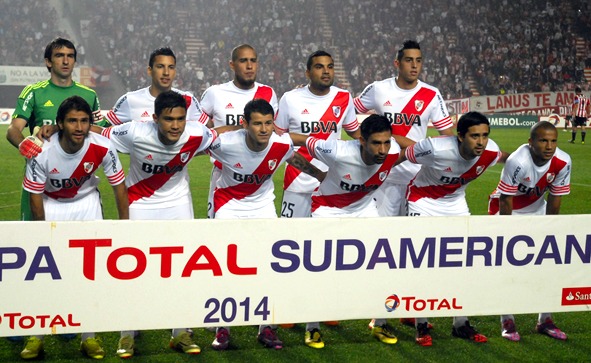
Teo played a pivotal role in River Plate's conquering of the 2014 Copa Sudamericana

After the relationship between Cruz Azul and the player worsened due to the persistent interest of River Plate's coach Ramón Díaz to bring the Colombian to his squad, Cruz Azul and River Plate reached an agreement thought to be around US$3 million in July 2013. Gutierrez has said that it was his dream to play for the Buenos Aires-based club. However, River Plate did not have sufficient funds for the player, and eventually he made a return to Cruz Azul. However, the issues were resolved thanks to FIFA's involvement, and the transfer was made official in August 2013.

He made his debut in a 2–1 loss against Colón on 25 August, where he scored his first goal. He would later be part of the team that crowned itself champion in the following tournament, scoring 6 goals. Under the management of Marcelo Gallardo, the Colombian scored 10 goals in 10 appearances in the 2014 Torneo de Transición.

In December 2014 River Plate won the 2014 Copa Sudamericana after a 3–1 aggregate victory over Atlético Nacional. This was Gutierrez's second title with the club. As a result of his great performances throughout the year, he was named as the 2014 South American Footballer of the Year, becoming only the second Colombian to win the award, after Carlos Valderrama. In February 2015, River Plate won the 2015 Recopa Sudamericana against San Lorenzo, with Gutierrez participating in both legs, hitting the post twice in the first leg.

On 27 May 2015, he scored and assisted in a 3–0 victory in the 2015 Copa Libertadores quarter-finals against Cruzeiro. Four days later, in his last match for River, he scored in a 2–0 victory against Rosario Central. In July 2015, shortly after Colombia's elimination from the Copa America, it became known that the Colombian striker had a desire to leave the club; River later announced that if the player returned to the club, he would have to play for the reserve team. Additionally, his agent stated that River Plate failed to pay the player's bonuses, but the club's president stated that nothing was owed to the player.

=== Sporting CP ===
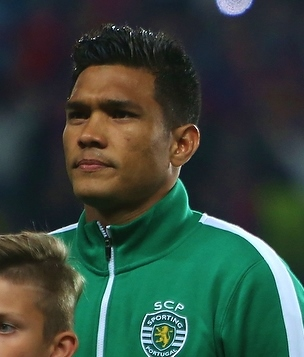
Teo lining up for Sporting in a Champions League match against CSKA Moscow in 2015

On 19 July 2015, Sporting CP announced the signing of Gutierrez on a three-year contract and a €40 million release clause. In August 2015, he scored in the first and second legs during the 2015–16 Champions League play-off matches against CSKA Moscow, although it was not enough as Sporting lost 3–4 on aggregate and failed to advance to the group stage. Sporting ended up placing third in their group, and were transferred to the Europa League, where they were eventually eliminated in the round of 32 by Bayer Leverkusen.

On 31 October, Gutierrez scored Sporting's only goal in the victory against Estoril Praia. On 10 December, he scored the last goal in a 3–1 victory over Beşiktaş, and made headlines for his bizarre goal celebration. He scored two goals in Sporting's 5–1 one-sided victory over Arouca on 18 March 2016. Two weeks later, he added another brace in a 2–5 away victory at Belenenses. His last goal for the club was scored on 15 May in a victory over Sporting Braga.

==== Rosario Central (loan) ====
On 6 August 2016, Gutierrez was announced as a Rosario Central player, on loan from Sporting. On 20 November 2016, he scored a goal against Boca Juniors in La Bombonera and was sent off shortly afterwards because of his controversial celebration, where he made a gesture across his chest signifying the diagonal slash of River Plate's uniform. This was a big deal because River Plate is Boca Junior's biggest rival. As a result, he was handed a two-game suspension.

On 15 December, he played and assisted Marco Ruben in the 2016 Copa Argentina Final, although Rosario lost 4–3 to his former club, River Plate.

In his last match with the club on 20 June 2017, he scored from the penalty spot and assisted Mauricio Martínez, although he was later sent off in a 3–3 draw to Talleres de Córdoba.

=== Return to Atlético Junior ===
On 26 June 2017, Gutierrez was signed by his hometown team Atlético Junior on a three-year deal. He made his debut in a 3–0 victory against La Equidad, scoring the third goal from the penalty spot.

He led his team to a Copa Colombia win in 2017, scoring in the second leg of the finals against Independiente Medellín. The next season, he scored against Independiente Medellin again, this time in the 2018 Finalizacion tournament. The match finished in a 4–1 victory for Junior and although Junior lost the second leg 3–1, they still won the title due to a 5–4 aggregate score.

On 5 June 2019, he scored and assisted in a 3–2 victory against Atletico Nacional, helping Junior make the finals. Gutierrez played both legs in the 2019 Apertura finals after beating Deportivo Pasto on penalties, completing a "bicampeonato" (two-time consecutive champion). He left the club in July 2021.

=== Later years ===
On 6 August 2021, Gutierrez signed with Deportivo Cali on a free transfer. On 22 December, Deportivo Cali won the 2021 Finalizacion tournament, with Gutierrez playing in both legs of the finals against Deportes Tolima.

On 4 February 2023, he was announced as a Atlético Bucaramanga player. On 20 May 2023, Bucaramanga rescinded their contract with Gutierrez, with the player failing to score or assist in 13 appearances.

On 18 July 2023, he returned to Deportivo Cali.

In December 2023, Gutierrez received a four-match suspension and fine, with rumours spreading around saying that he touched a female staff member inappropriately in 2–0 loss against Deportes Tolima on 25 November. He did not deny touching the woman, but denied touching her inappropriately and further stated that he had "nothing against women" and that they "have my respect".

On 10 February 2025, he was announced as a Junior player, returning for his third spell at the club.

== International career ==
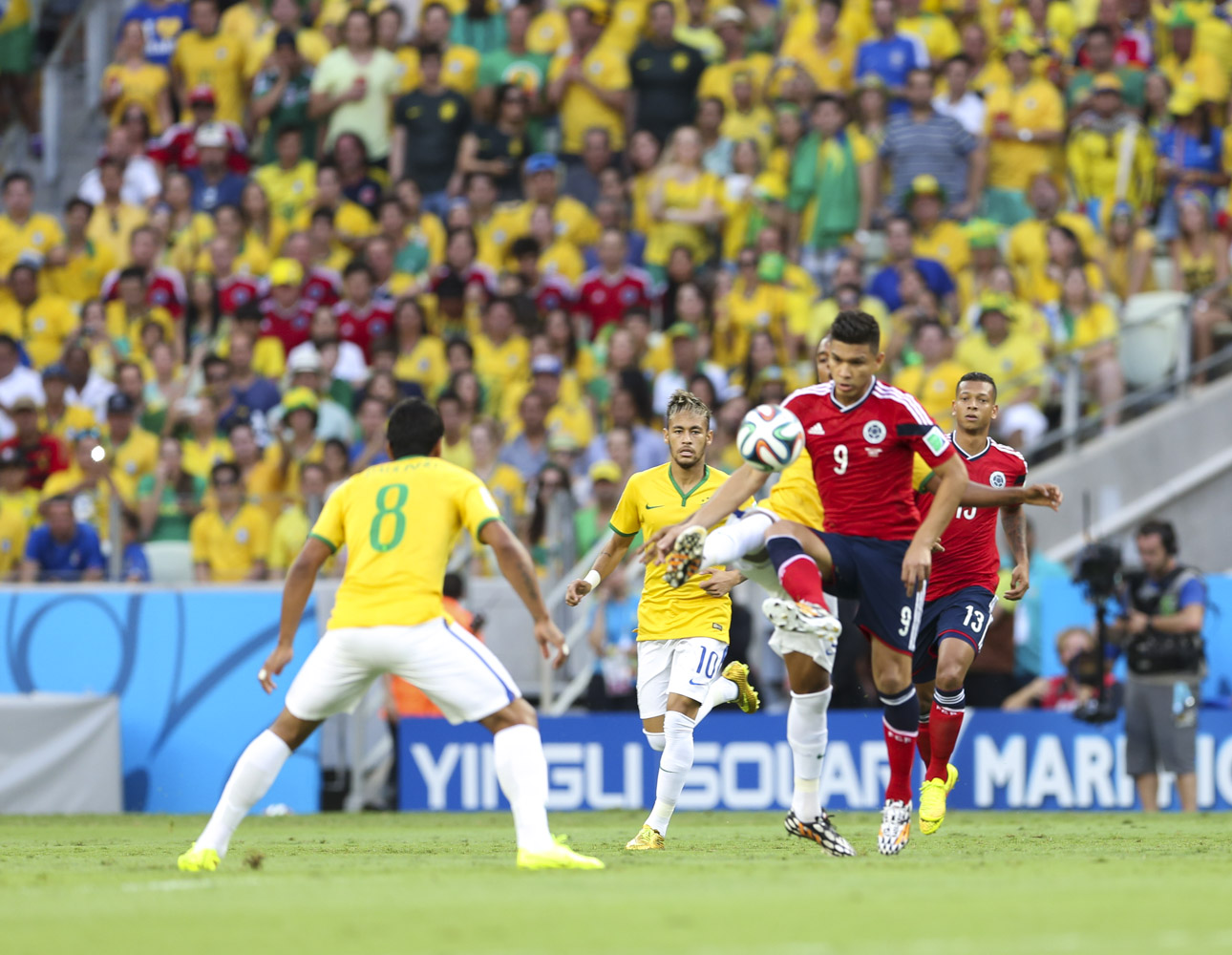
Gutierrez during Colombia's 2014 World Cup quarter-final match against Brazil

Gutiérrez scored in his international debut for Colombia on 7 August 2009 in a 2–1 victory against El Salvador. In his third call up to the Colombia national team, he made his first competitive appearance in a qualifying game for the 2010 FIFA World Cup against Ecuador, scoring the second goal in a 2–0 victory.

Gutierrez was selected for the 2011 Copa America, making 3 appearances as a substitute.

During the 2014 FIFA World Cup qualifiers, Gutiérrez scored six goals in 11 matches, including a brace in a 4–0 victory against Uruguay on 7 September 2012, and Colombia's first goal in a 3–3 draw against Chile on 11 October 2013. This result ensured Colombia's qualification to the 2014 World Cup. In June 2014, he was named in Colombia's squad for the 2014 FIFA World Cup finals and, after the withdrawal of Radamel Falcao through injury, took the number 9 shirt for Los Cafeteros. In the team's opening match of the tournament, Gutiérrez scored Colombia's second goal in a 3–0 win against Greece.

In the 2015 Copa America Gutierrez made 4 substitute appearances.

In May 2018 he was named in Colombia's preliminary 35-man squad for the 2018 World Cup in Russia. However, he did not make the final 23.

== Style of play ==
Gutiérrez is a prolific forward, since he gets into finishing positions easily and he can score from long range as well. He also has great passing and technical ability, because he started his youth career playing as a playmaker, and has the ability to create plays and make through passes to his teammates using his superior vision. He is often the connecting link between the midfielders and the forwards. During his time with River, Juan Román Riquelme praised him, calling him "one of the best players in Argentinian football." He is, however, sometimes criticized for being hotheaded and making rash decisions when he gets angry.

== Career statistics ==
Scores and results list Colombia's goal tally first, score column indicates score after each Gutiérrez goal.

List of international goals scored by Teófilo Gutiérrez
| No. | Date | Venue | Opponent | Score | Result | Competition |
|---|---|---|---|---|---|---|
| 1 | 7 August 2009 | Robertson Stadium, Houston, United States | El Salvador | 1–1 | 2–1 | Friendly |
| 2 | 5 September 2009 | Estadio Atanasio Girardot, Medellín, Colombia | Ecuador | 2–0 | 2–0 | 2010 FIFA World Cup qualification |
| 3 | 3 September 2011 | Red Bull Arena, Harrison, United States | Honduras | 1–0 | 2–0 | Friendly |
| 4 | 3 September 2011 | Red Bull Arena, Harrison, United States | Honduras | 2–0 | 2–0 | Friendly |
| 5 | 6 September 2011 | Lockhart Stadium, Fort Lauderdale, United States | Jamaica | 1–0 | 2–0 | Friendly |
| 6 | 7 September 2012 | Estadio Metropolitano Roberto Meléndez, Barranquilla, Colombia | Uruguay | 2–0 | 4–0 | 2014 FIFA World Cup qualification |
| 7 | 7 September 2012 | Estadio Metropolitano Roberto Meléndez, Barranquilla, Colombia | Uruguay | 3–0 | 4–0 | 2014 FIFA World Cup qualification |
| 8 | 11 September 2012 | Estadio Monumental David Arellano, Santiago, Chile | Chile | 3–1 | 3–1 | 2014 FIFA World Cup qualification |
| 9 | 22 March 2013 | Estadio Metropolitano Roberto Meléndez, Barranquilla, Colombia | Bolivia | 3–0 | 5–0 | 2014 FIFA World Cup qualification |
| 10 | 11 June 2013 | Estadio Metropolitano Roberto Meléndez, Barranquilla, Colombia | Peru | 2–0 | 2–0 | 2014 FIFA World Cup qualification |
| 11 | 11 October 2013 | Estadio Metropolitano Roberto Meléndez, Barranquilla, Colombia | Chile | 1–3 | 3–3 | 2014 FIFA World Cup qualification |
| 12 | 31 May 2014 | Estadio Pedro Bidegain, Buenos Aires, Argentina | Senegal | 1–0 | 2–2 | Friendly |
| 13 | 14 June 2014 | Estádio Mineirão, Belo Horizonte, Brazil | Greece | 2–0 | 3–0 | 2014 FIFA World Cup |
| 14 | 14 November 2014 | Craven Cottage, London, England | United States | 2–1 | 2–1 | Friendly |
| 15 | 8 October 2015 | Estadio Metropolitano Roberto Meléndez, Barranquilla, Colombia | Peru | 1–0 | 2–0 | 2018 FIFA World Cup qualification |

== Honours ==
Trabzonspor

- Turkish Cup: 2009–10
- Turkish Super Cup: 2010

Cruz Azul

- Copa MX: Clausura 2013

River Plate

- Argentine Primera División: Torneo Final 2014
- Argentine Super Liga Final: 2014
- Copa Sudamericana: 2014
- Recopa Sudamericana: 2015
- Copa Libertadores: 2015

Sporting

- Supertaça Cândido de Oliveira: 2015

Junior

- Categoría Primera A: 2018–II, 2019–I, 2025–II, 2026–I
- Copa Colombia: 2017
- Superliga Colombiana: 2019, 2020

Deportivo Cali

- Categoría Primera A: 2021–II

Individual

- 2009 Categoría Primera A Apertura top scorer (16 goals)
- 2010 Turkish Super Cup Most Valuable Player
- Argentine Primera Division Clausura 2011 top scorer
- 2014 South American Footballer of the Year

Sporting positions
| Preceded by Darwin Andrade | Deportivo Cali captain 2021–2022 | Succeeded by Germán Mera |
