= Yakup Bugun =

Turkish professional footballer

Personal information
- Date of birth: 5 May 1987 (age 39)
- Place of birth: Sarıgöl, Manisa, Turkey
- Height: 1.88 m (6 ft 2 in)
- Position: Goalkeeper

Team information
- Current team: Keçiörengücü
- Number: 13

Youth career
- Sarıgölspor
- Altınordu

Senior career*
Years	Team	Apps	(Gls)
2005–2008	Altınordu	39	(0)
2008–2010	Trabzonspor	0	(0)
2008–2009	→ 1461 Trabzon (loan)	6	(0)
2009	→ Altınordu (loan)	16	(0)
2009–2010	→ Alanyaspor (loan)	35	(0)
2010–2012	Denizlispor	12	(0)
2012–2013	1461 Trabzon	2	(0)
2013–2016	Pendikspor	72	(0)
2016–2017	Sivas Belediye Spor	35	(0)
2017–	Keçiörengücü	1	(0)
- * Club domestic league appearances and goals as of 8 September 2017

Yakup Bugun (born 5 May 1987) is a Turkish professional footballer who plays as a goalkeeper for Keçiörengücü.

== Life and career ==
Bugun was born in Sarıgöl, Manisa. He joined local club Sarıgölspor as a youth player and moved to Altınordu soon after, and made his professional debut on 7 October 2006. Trabzonspor transferred him in 2008, loaning him out to feeder club Trabzon Karadenizspor immediately. Bugun has also been loaned out to Altınordu and Alanyaspor.
