= Murat Tosun =

Turkish footballer

Personal information
- Full name: Murat Tosun
- Date of birth: 26 February 1984 (age 42)
- Place of birth: Berlin, Germany
- Height: 1.83 m (6 ft 0 in)
- Positions: Right winger; striker

Team information
- Current team: Manisaspor
- Number: 11

Youth career
- SV Tasmania-Gropiusstadt 1973

Senior career*
| Years | Team | Apps | (Gls) |
| 2005 | Tennis Borussia Berlin | 10 | (2) |
| 2005–2006 | Karşıyaka | 20 | (4) |
| 2006–2010 | Ankaraspor | 69 | (12) |
| 2010–2012 | Trabzonspor | 6 | (1) |
| 2010–2011 | → Konyaspor (loan) | 5 | (0) |
| 2011–2012 | → 1461 Trabzon (loan) | 11 | (8) |
| 2012– | Manisaspor | 4 | (0) |
- * Club domestic league appearances and goals as of 30 October 2012

Murat Tosun (born 26 February 1984 in Berlin, Germany) is a Turkish footballer who currently plays as a right winger and striker for Manisaspor.

== Honours ==
=== Trabzonspor ===
- Turkish Cup: 2010
- Turkish Super Cup: 2010
