= Ferhat Öztorun =

Turkish footballer

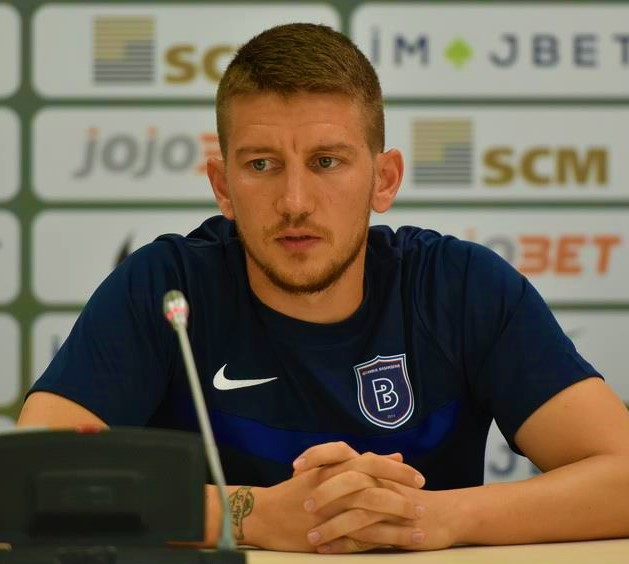

Personal information
- Date of birth: 8 May 1987 (age 39)
- Place of birth: Şişli, Istanbul, Turkey
- Height: 1.75 m (5 ft 9 in)
- Position: Left wing back

Youth career
- 1997–2005: Galatasaray

Senior career*
Years	Team	Apps	(Gls)
2005–2007	Galatasaray	19	(0)
2007–2009	Manisaspor	52	(1)
2009–2013	Trabzonspor	30	(0)
2013–2014	Orduspor	47	(1)
2014–2017	İstanbul Başakşehir	50	(0)
2017–2020	Konyaspor	54	(0)
2020–2022	Tuzlaspor	52	(0)
2022–2023	Pendikspor	28	(0)

International career
2006–2008	Turkey U21	18	(0)
2011	Turkey B	1	(0)

Managerial career
- 2023–2025: Pendikspor (assistant)
- * Club domestic league appearances and goals

Ferhat Öztorun (born 8 May 1987) is a Turkish professional football coach and a former player who played as a defender. He was an assistant coach with Pendikspor.

== Club career ==
After playing several years for Galatasaray's youth teams, Öztorun was promoted to first team squad for the 2005–06 season. After Orhan Ak and Ergün Penbe, who were the squad's experienced left backs, experienced injuries, Öztorun made his debut in a league match between Konyaspor and Galatasaray in Konya on 22 January 2006. Following his debut, he filled a squad-rotation role at the club.

Öztorun was transferred to Vestel Manisaspor on 3 September 2007.

== Honours ==
Trabzonspor

- Turkish Super Cup: 2010

Konyaspor

- Turkish Super Cup: 2017
