= Volkan Ünlü =

Turkish footballer

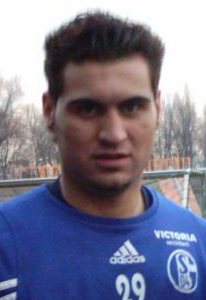
- Ünlü with Schalke 04

Personal information
- Date of birth: 8 July 1983 (age 43)
- Place of birth: Gelsenkirchen, West Germany
- Height: 1.90 m (6 ft 3 in)
- Position: Goalkeeper

Youth career
- 1995–1996: FC Gladbeck
- 1996–1998: SV Höntrop
- 1998–2002: Schalke 04

Senior career*
| Years | Team | Apps | (Gls) |
| 2002–2005 | Schalke 04 | 4 | (0) |
| 2005–2006 | Beşiktaş | 0 | (0) |
| 2007 | Çaykur Rizespor | 1 | (0) |
| 2007–2009 | Sivasspor | 26 | (0) |
| 2009–2010 | MVV Maastricht | 5 | (0) |
| 2010–2011 | Trabzonspor | 5 | (0) |
| 2010–2011 | → 1461 Trabzon (loan) | 0 | (0) |
| 2011–2012 | SG Sonnenhof Großaspach | 4 | (0) |
| 2013 | KFC Uerdingen 05 | 2 | (0) |
| Total | | 47 | (0) |
- * Club domestic league appearances and goals

Volkan Ünlü (born 8 July 1983) is a Turkish former professional footballer who played as a goalkeeper and current goalkeeper coach of Schalke 04.
