= Umut Bulut =

Turkish footballer (born 1983)

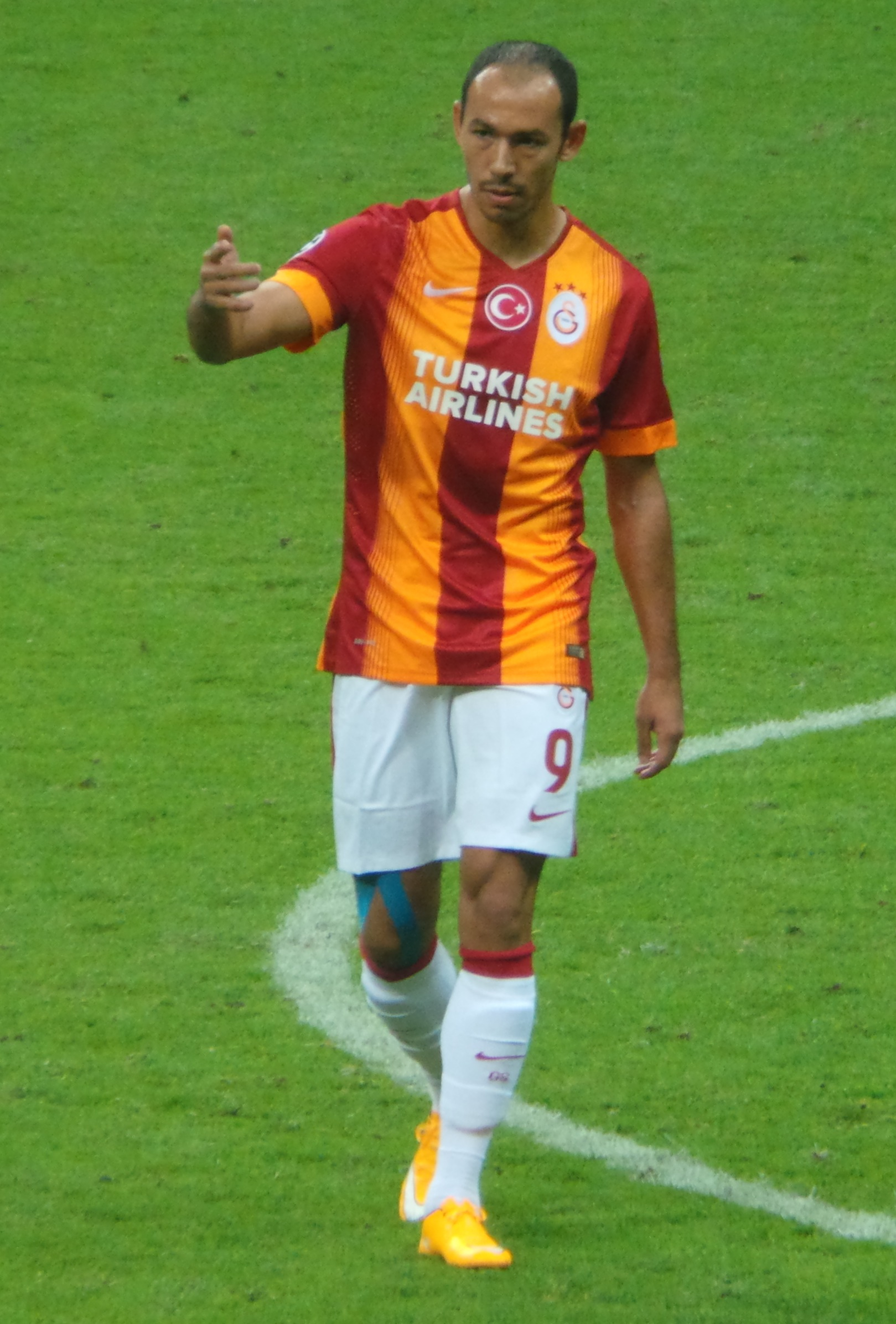
- Bulut with Galatasaray in 2014

Personal information
- Date of birth: 15 March 1983 (age 43)
- Place of birth: Kayseri, Turkey
- Height: 1.84 m (6 ft 0 in)
- Position: Striker

Youth career
- 1994–2000: Petrol Ofisi

Senior career*
Years	Team	Apps	(Gls)
2000–2001	Petrol Ofisi	28	(5)
2001–2006	Ankaragücü	90	(36)
2002–2003	→ İnegölspor (loan)	30	(6)
2006–2011	Trabzonspor	161	(67)
2011–2013	Toulouse	31	(5)
2012–2013	→ Galatasaray (loan)	27	(12)
2013–2016	Galatasaray	87	(20)
2016–2019	Kayserispor	102	(23)
2020–2021	Yeni Malatyaspor	48	(5)
2021–2023	Eyüpspor	56	(14)
2023–2024	Sarıyer	29	(12)
Total		689	(205)

International career
2001	Turkey U19	4	(1)
2002	Turkey U20	2	(0)
2004–2005	Turkey U21	21	(0)
2007–2018	Turkey	39	(10)
- * Club domestic league appearances and goals

Umut Bulut (Turkish pronunciation: [ˈumut ˈbuɫut], born 15 March 1983) is a Turkish former professional footballer. Between 2007 and 2018, he made 39 appearances and scored ten goals for the Turkey national team. On 24th June 2024, Umut Bulut ended his football career at the age of 41.

== Club career ==
=== Trabzonspor ===
Due to prolific goalscorer Fatih Tekke leaving the club, and the club having difficulties with results, Trabzonspor signed Bulut for €1.8 million on a four-year contract. He was given the number 10 jersey which was previously worn by Hami Mandıralı. His first match was on 5 August 2006 against Kayserispor. The following week he scored his first goal for the club in a 1–1 draw against Manisaspor. Overall, Bulut scored 88 goals in 197 official games for Trabzonspor, winning the 2010 Turkish Super Cup as well as the 2009–10 Turkish Cup, scoring in the final against rivals Fenerbahçe during a 3–1 win.

=== Toulouse ===
On 28 June 2011, Bulut signed with French club Toulouse for €4.8 million. He made his Ligue 1 debut against Ajaccio on 6 August 2011. One week later, he scored his first goal for the club against Dijon, before getting a second goal for Toulouse against Nancy in a 1–0 win. In the seventeenth week of the season, Bulut scored the winning goal in a 2–1 victory against Evian. The only other two goals he scored for the club were both against Lyon, including one from an outstanding long range shot.

=== Galatasaray ===
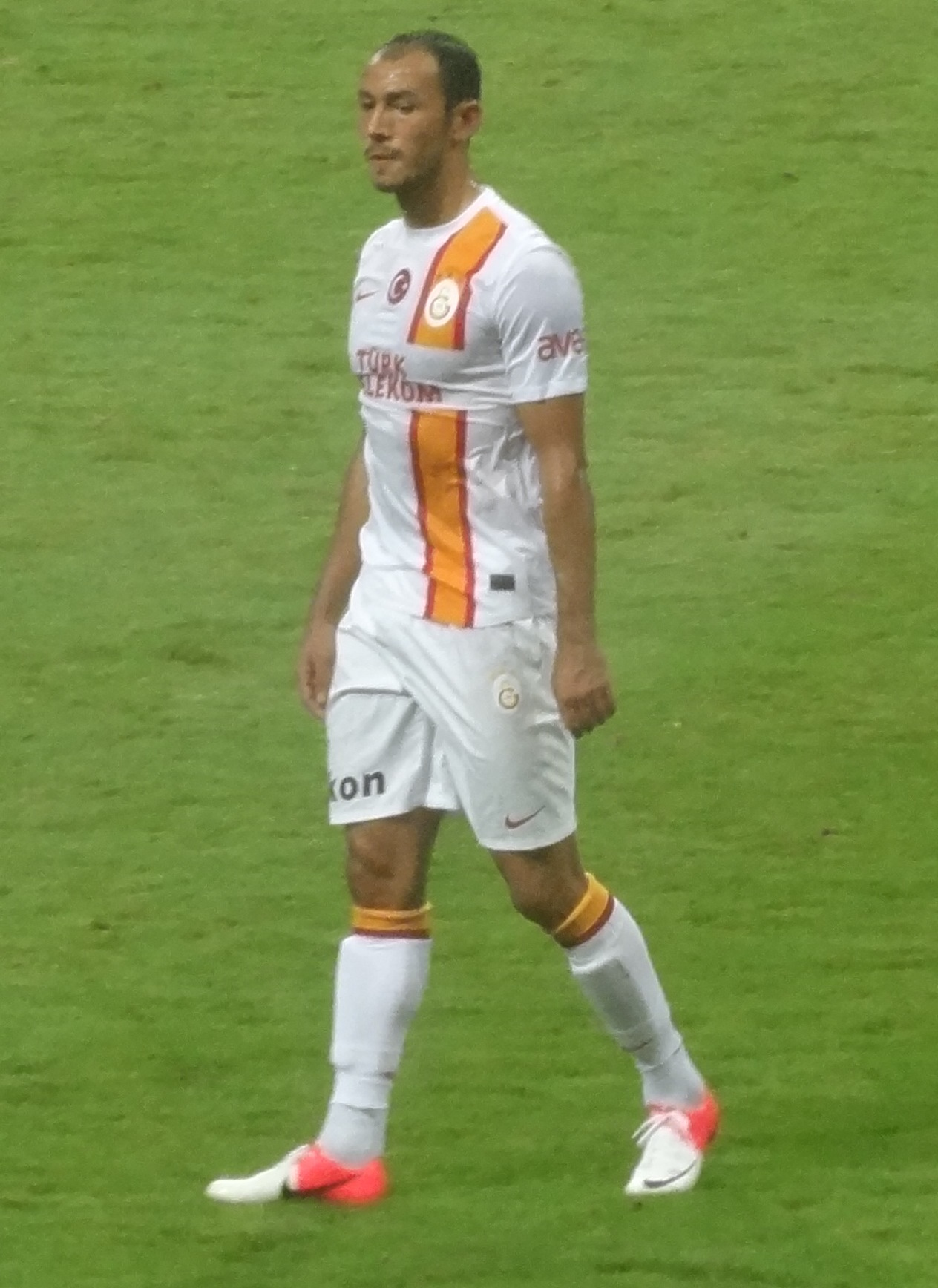
Bulut during his first home match for Galatasaray in 2012.

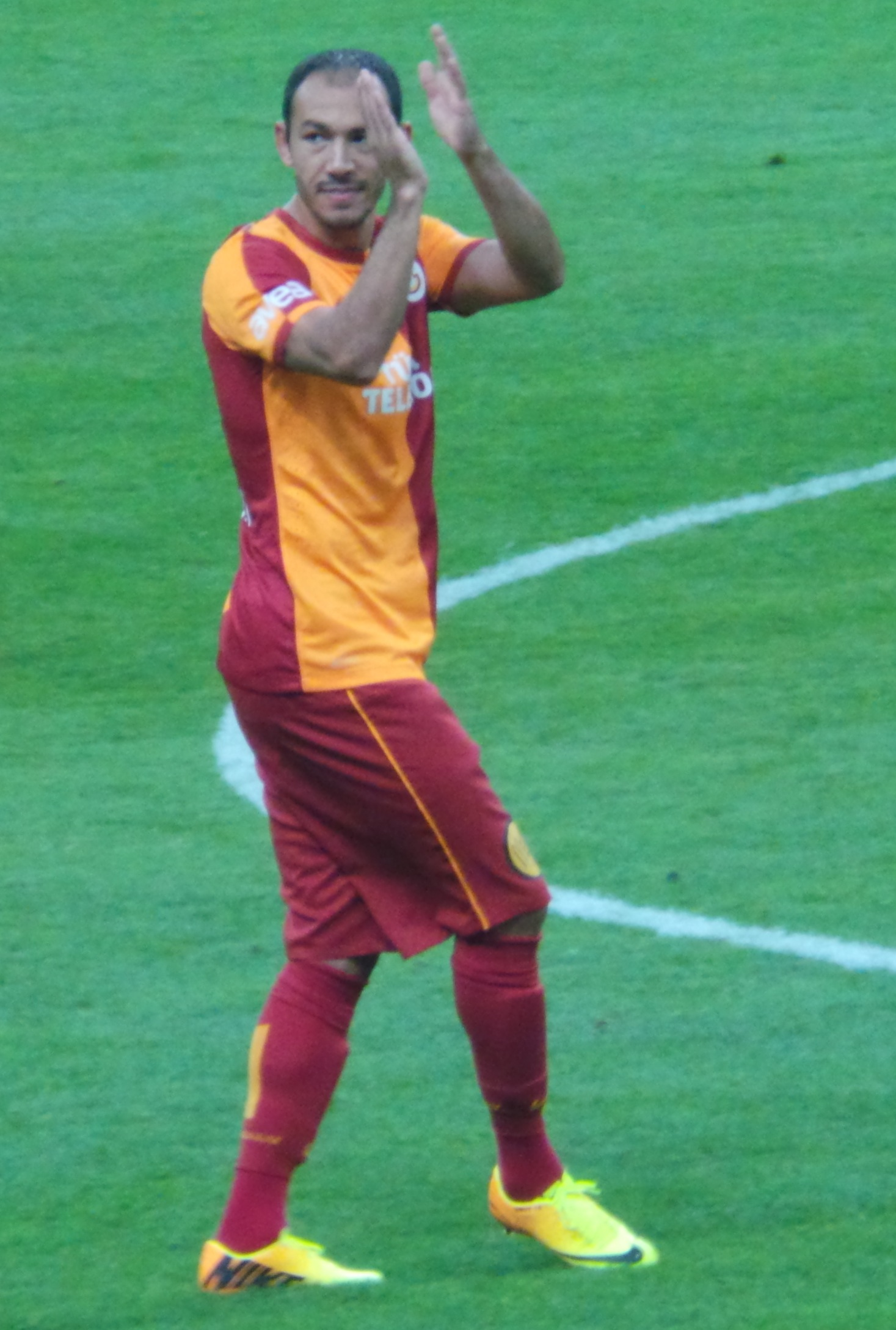
Bulut during the 2013–14 season.

On 26 June 2012, Bulut joined Galatasaray on loan until the end of the season. He scored two goals on his debut for the club against their rivals Fenerbahçe during the 2012 Turkish Super Cup. Galatasaray won the game 3–2, with Bulut being named Man of the Match.

On 20 August 2012, Bulut made his first appearance in the 2012–13 Süper Lig season against Kasımpaşa as he was included in the starting eleven, and he scored a brace for Galatasaray as the game finished 2–1. Bulut got the equaliser in the following match against Beşiktaş as the game finished 3–3. On 2 September 2012, he again scored the opening goal of the match, in Galatasaray's 3–2 win against Bursaspor, the one thousandth league win in the club's history. Bulut's next goal came on 15 September 2012, scoring in the 90th minute as Galatasary won 4–0 against Antalyaspor. His five league goals in the first four weeks of the season surpassed the record set by Saša Ilić. On 19 October, Bulut scored an crucial goal for Galatasaray against Gençlerbirliği, helping his side come from 1–3 down to tie the game 3–3. After disappointing performances in both the Süper Lig and Champions League during the month of October, Bulut returned with another excellent match as he scored the opener against Kayserispor in a 3–0 win. The following week he scored his tenth goal of the season, again getting the opener in a 3–1 victory against İstanbul B.B. after converting from teammate Burak Yılmaz's assist.

Following his successful loan spell, Galatasaray officially signed Bulut from Toulouse on a three-and-a-half year deal for €2.7 million.

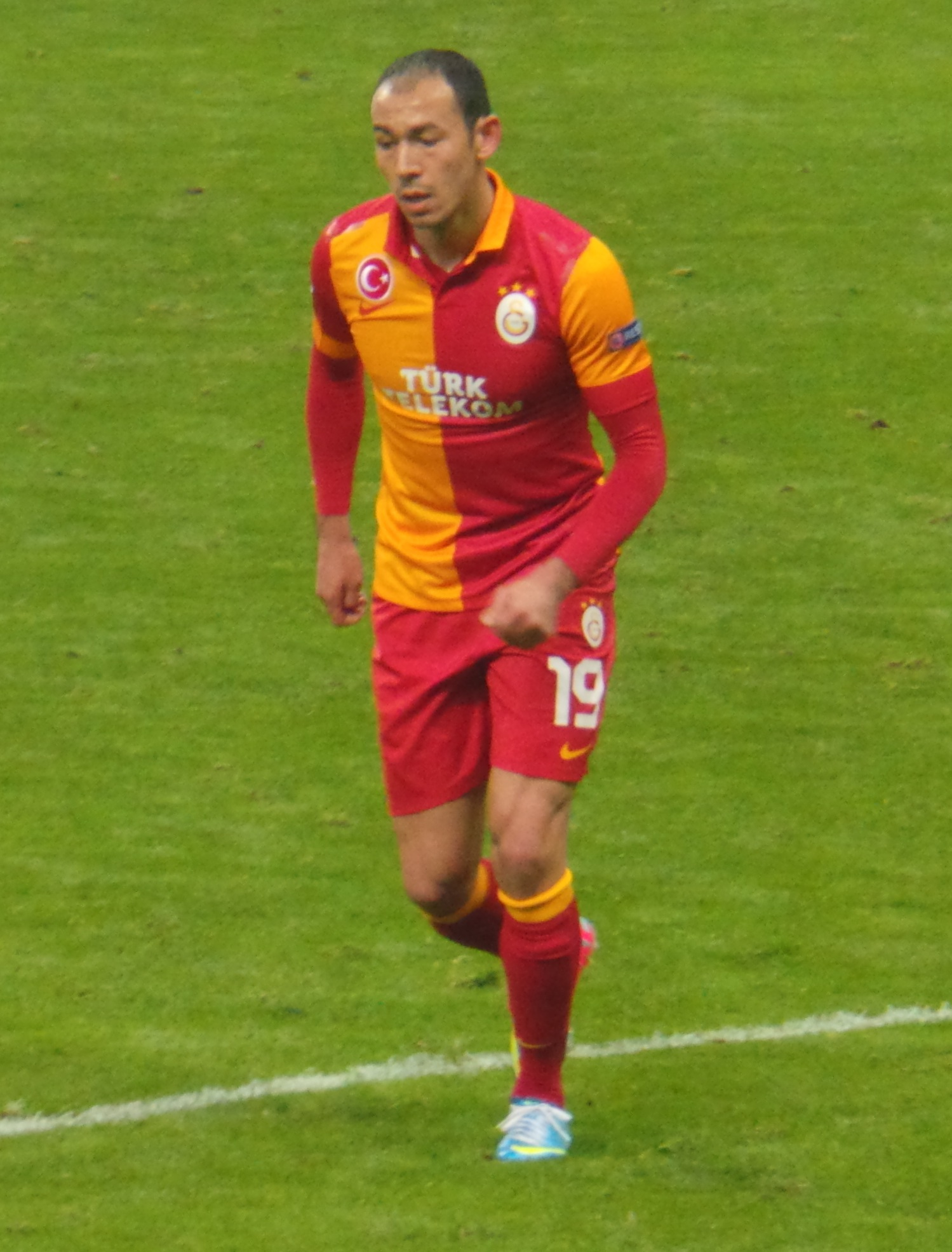
Bulut playing for Galatasaray against Real Madrid in 2013.

=== Kayserispor ===
On 25 August 2016, Bulut joined Kayserispor on a two-year contract. Galatasaray covered €600,000 of his €1.5 million salary.

=== Yeni Malatyaspor ===
On 19 December 2019, Bulut joined Yeni Malatyaspor, signing a one-and-a-half year contract.

=== Eyüpspor ===
On June 18, 2021, Bulut signed a one-and-a-half year contract with Eyüpspor.

=== Sarıyer ===
On 14 August 2023, Bulut joined Turkish Third Division side Sarıyer.

== International career ==
Bulut made his international debut in Turkey's draw against Brazil on 5 June 2007. He scored his first two international goals on 2 June 2012, in a 3–1 friendly victory against Portugal. Bulut then scored a hat-trick against Andorra in Turkey's 5–0 World Cup qualifier win on 6 September 2013.

== Personal life ==
On 14 March 2016, it was revealed that Umut Bulut's father Kemal had been killed in a terrorist attack in Ankara during the previous day, shortly after he had watched Galatasaray's match against Gençlerbirliği.

== Career statistics ==
=== Club ===
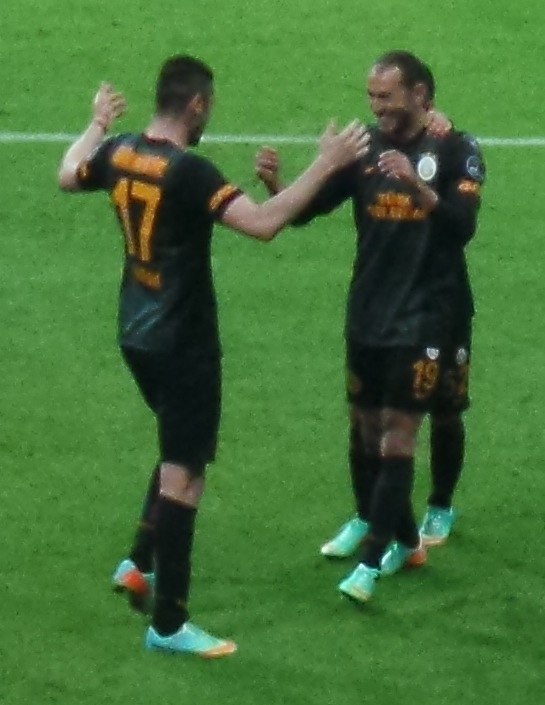
Bulut celebrating after scoring for Galatasaray

Appearances and goals by club, season and competition
Club	Season	League			National cup		League cup/ Super cup		Europe		Total	
Club	Season	Division	Apps	Goals	Apps	Goals	Apps	Goals	Apps	Goals	Apps	Goals
Petrol Ofisi	1999–2000	Turkish Second League	2	0	—		—		—		2	0
Petrol Ofisi	2000–01	Turkish Second League	26	5	0	0	—		—		26	5
Petrol Ofisi	Total		28	5	0	0	—		—		28	5
Ankaragücü	2001–02	Süper Lig	1	0	0	0	—		—		1	0
Ankaragücü	2003–04	Süper Lig	22	11	2	0	—		—		24	11
Ankaragücü	2004–05	Süper Lig	34	9	2	0	—		—		36	9
Ankaragücü	2005–06	Süper Lig	33	16	3	3	—		—		36	19
Ankaragücü	Total		90	36	7	3	—		—		97	39
İnegölspor (loan)	2002–03	Turkish Second League	30	6	0	0	—		—		30	6
Trabzonspor	2006–07	Süper Lig	31	15	8	4	—		3	1	42	20
Trabzonspor	2007–08	Süper Lig	33	14	4	3	—		3	2	40	19
Trabzonspor	2008–09	Süper Lig	33	14	4	0	—		—		37	14
Trabzonspor	2009–10	Süper Lig	31	11	9	7	—		2	0	42	18
Trabzonspor	2010–11	Süper Lig	33	13	4	3	—		1	0	38	16
Trabzonspor	Total		161	67	29	17	—		9	3	199	87
Toulouse	2011–12	Ligue 1	31	5	1	0	0	0	—		32	5
Galatasaray (loan)	2012–13	Süper Lig	27	12	0	0	1	2	10	1	38	15
Galatasaray	2013–14	Süper Lig	27	5	10	1	1	0	8	3	46	9
Galatasaray	2014–15	Süper Lig	33	11	5	1	0	0	5	0	43	12
Galatasaray	2015–16	Süper Lig	27	4	10	3	1	0	8	0	46	7
Galatasaray	Total		114	32	25	5	3	2	31	4	173	43
Kayserispor	2016–17	Süper Lig	31	4	6	2	—		—		37	6
Kayserispor	2017–18	Süper Lig	32	14	2	1	—		—		34	15
Kayserispor	2018–19	Süper Lig	28	2	2	0	—		—		30	2
Kayserispor	2019–20	Süper Lig	11	3	0	0	—		—		11	3
Kayserispor	Total		102	23	10	3	—		—		112	26
Yeni Malatyaspor	2019–20	Süper Lig	17	3	2	0	—		—		19	3
Yeni Malatyaspor	2020–21	Süper Lig	31	2	3	2	—		—		34	4
Yeni Malatyaspor	Total		48	5	5	2	—		—		53	7
Eyüpspor	2021–22	TFF First League	37	14	0	0	—		—		37	14
Eyüpspor	2022–23	TFF First League	19	0	2	1	—		—		21	1
Eyüpspor	Total		56	14	2	1	—		—		58	15
Sarıyer	2023–24	TFF Second League	29	12	0	0	—		—		29	12
Career total			689	205	79	31	3	2	40	7	811	245

=== International ===
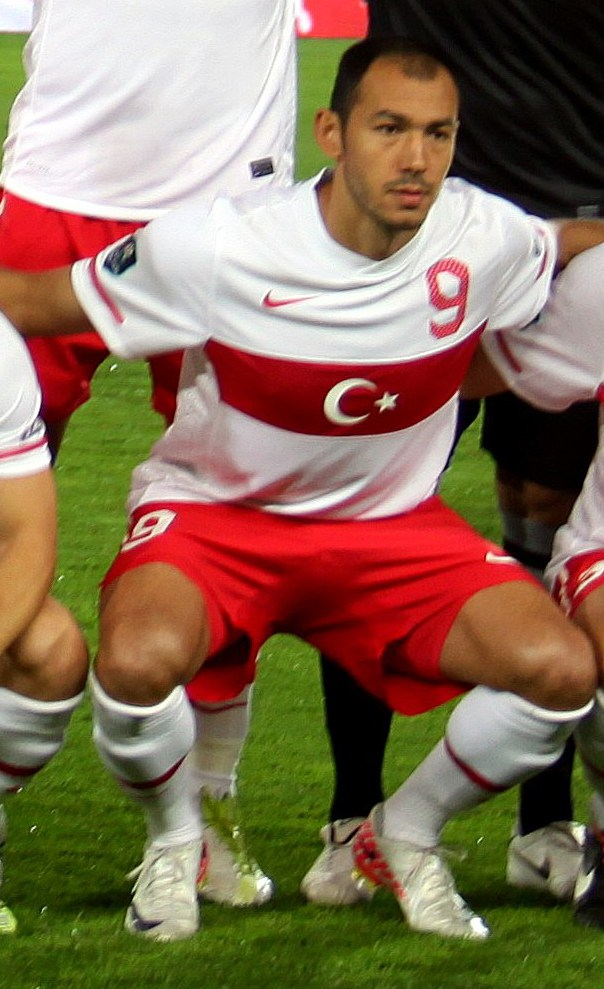
Bulut with the Turkey national team in 2011.

Appearances and goals by national team and year
National team	Year	Apps	Goals
Turkey	2007	1	0
Turkey	2008	0	0
Turkey	2009	0	0
Turkey	2010	1	0
Turkey	2011	7	0
Turkey	2012	11	3
Turkey	2013	9	6
Turkey	2014	5	1
Turkey	2015	4	0
Turkey	2018	1	0
Total		39	10

Scores and results table list Turkey's goal tally first.

List of international goals scored by Umut Bulut
No.	Date	Venue	Opponent	Score	Result	Competition
1.	2 June 2012	Estádio da Luz, Lisbon, Portugal	Portugal	1–0	3–1	Friendly
2.	2 June 2012	Estádio da Luz, Lisbon, Portugal	Portugal	2–1	3–1	Friendly
3.	11 September 2012	Şükrü Saracoğlu Stadium, Istanbul, Turkey	Estonia	2–0	3–0	2014 FIFA World Cup qualification
4.	14 August 2013	Atatürk Olympic Stadium, Istanbul, Turkey	Ghana	2–0	2–2	Friendly
5.	6 September 2013	Kadir Has Stadium, Kayseri, Turkey	Andorra	1–0	5–0	2014 FIFA World Cup qualification
6.	6 September 2013	Kadir Has Stadium, Kayseri, Turkey	Andorra	2–0	5–0	2014 FIFA World Cup qualification
7.	6 September 2013	Kadir Has Stadium, Kayseri, Turkey	Andorra	4–0	5–0	2014 FIFA World Cup qualification
8.	11 October 2013	A Le Coq Arena, Tallinn, Estonia	Estonia	1–0	2–0	2014 FIFA World Cup qualification
9.	19 November 2013	Tevfik Sırrı Gür Stadium, Mersin, Turkey	Belarus	1–0	2–1	Friendly
10.	10 October 2014	Şükrü Saracoğlu Stadium, Istanbul, Turkey	Czech Republic	1–0	1–2	UEFA Euro 2016 qualifying

== Honours ==
Trabzonspor

- Turkish Cup: 2009–10
- Turkish Super Cup: 2010

Galatasaray

- Süper Lig: 2012–13, 2014–15
- Turkish Cup: 2013–14, 2014–15, 2015–16
- Turkish Super Cup: 2012, 2013, 2015
