= Barış Ataş =

Turkish footballer (born 1987)

Personal information
- Full name: Barış Ataş
- Date of birth: 1 February 1987 (age 39)
- Place of birth: Kulp, Turkey
- Height: 1.70 m (5 ft 7 in)
- Position: Midfielder

Team information
- Current team: Diyarbakır BB
- Number: 61

Youth career
- 2000–2002: Balıkspor
- 2002–2005: Diyarbakırspor

Senior career*
Years	Team	Apps	(Gls)
2005–2010	Diyarbakırspor	87	(0)
2010–2012	Trabzonspor	17	(0)
2012	→ Mersin İY (loan)	6	(0)
2013	Adanaspor	14	(0)
2013	Fethiyespor	9	(0)
2014–2015	Diyarbakır BB	30	(2)
2015–2016	Diyarbakırspor	32	(1)
2016–	Diyarbakır BB	11	(0)

International career
2006	Turkey U19	10	(0)
2006–2008	Turkey U21	4	(0)
- * Club domestic league appearances and goals as of 30 July 2015

Barış Ataş (born 1 February 1987) is a Turkish professional footballer who currently plays for Amed S.F.K.

== Life and career ==
Ataş was born in Kulp, Diyarbakır. He began his footballing career as a thirteen-year-old with Balıkspor. He was transferred to Diyarbakırspor in 2002, making his professional league debut on 4 February 2006. He scored 6 goals in 96 appearances in the A2 league.

Ataş signed a 3+1 contract with Trabzonspor on 22 June 2010.

== Honours ==
Trabzonspor

- Turkish Super Cup: 2010
