= Sarıgöl =

- District and municipality
- Map showing Sarıgöl District in Manisa Province

- Location in Turkey Sarıgöl (Turkey Aegean)
- Coordinates: 38°14′17″N 28°41′46″E
- Country: Turkey
- Province: Manisa
- Area: 432 km^{2} (167 sq mi)
- Elevation: 220 m (720 ft)
- Population (2022): 35,537
  - Density: 82/km^{2} (210/sq mi)
- Time zone: UTC+3 (TRT)
- Postal code: 45470
- Area code: 0236

Sarıgöl
- Elevation: 194 m (636 ft)

Sarıgöl is a municipality and district of Manisa Province, Turkey. Its area is 432 km^{2}, and its population is 35,537 (2022). The town lies at an elevation of 220 m (722 ft).

== History ==
Sarıgöl is a small town located between the provinces of Denizli and Manisa. According to some historians, it has been an important city throughout history. There was an ancient city called Callatebus (Ancient Greek: Καλλάτηβος) in the vicinity of today's Sarıgöl. The city of Kallatebos (Callatebus) was mentioned by Herodotus in his Histories 7th book's 31st paragraph. The city was between Philadelphia (Alaşehir) and Hierapolis (Pamukkale).

== Composition ==
There are 35 neighbourhoods in Sarıgöl District:

- Afşar
- Ahmetağa
- Alemşahlı
- Aşağıkoçaklar
- Ayan
- Bağlıca
- Bahadırlar
- Baharlar
- Bereketli
- Beyharmanı
- Çanakçı
- Çavuşlar
- Çimentepe
- Cumhuriyet
- Dadağlı
- Dindarlı
- Doğuşlar
- Emcelli
- Güneydamları
- Günyaka
- Kahramanlar
- Karacaali
- Kızılçukur
- Konak
- Mimarsinan
- Özpınar
- Selimiye
- Şeyhdavutlar
- Sığırtmaçlı
- Siteler
- Tırazlar
- Yeniköy
- Yeşiltepe
- Yukarıkoçaklar
- Ziyanlar
