= Musa Büyük =

Turkish footballer (born 1980)

Personal information
- Full name: Musa Büyük
- Date of birth: May 22, 1980 (age 46)
- Place of birth: Çatalca, Turkey
- Height: 1.68 m (5 ft 6 in)
- Position: Winger

Youth career
- 1996–1999: Tepecik Belediyespor

Senior career*
Years	Team	Apps	(Gls)
1997–2001	Tepecik Belediyespor	86	(11)
2001–2003	Zeytinburnuspor	53	(5)
2003–2004	İstanbulspor	45	(0)
2005–2006	Ankaraspor	47	(3)
2006–2008	Trabzonspor	27	(0)
2008–2009	Kocaelispor	12	(0)
2009	Konyaspor	4	(0)
2009–2010	Diyarbakirspor	9	(0)
2011–2012	Samsunspor	4	(0)
2012–2013	Çetinkaya Türk	9	(0)
2013	Kırklarelispor	1	(0)

International career
2004–2005	Turkey B	3	(0)
- * Club domestic league appearances and goals

Musa Büyük (born May 22, 1980) is a Turkish retired footballer. He played as a winger.

== Career ==
He played for Zeytinburnuspor (1996–2003), İstanbulspor (2003–2004), Ankaraspor (2005–2006), Trabzonspor (2006–2008) and Kocaelispor (2008–2009). He was capped three times for the Turkey B.
