= Adnan Güngör =

Turkish footballer

Personal information
- Full name: Adnan Güngör
- Date of birth: September 20, 1980 (age 46)
- Place of birth: Samsun, Turkey
- Height: 1.79 m (5 ft 10 in)
- Position: Defensive midfielder

Youth career
- 1996–1999: İlkadım Belediyesi

Senior career*
Years	Team	Apps	(Gls)
1999–2007	Samsunspor	177	(16)
2007–2009	Trabzonspor	18	(0)
2009	Hacettepe	14	(0)
2009–2010	Diyarbakırspor	30	(2)
2010–2011	Konyaspor	29	(1)
2011–2012	Adanaspor	30	(3)
2012–2013	Karşıyaka	31	(1)
2013–2014	Samsunspor	27	(0)
2014–2015	Kocaeli Birlik Spor	29	(0)
2015–2016	Sakaryaspor	33	(0)

International career
2000	Turkey U21	1	(0)
- * Club domestic league appearances and goals as of 27 December 2016 (UTC)

Adnan Güngör (born 20 September 1980) is a Turkish professional footballer who last played as a defensive midfielder for Sakaryaspor. He has been capped by the Turkey national under-21 football team.
