= Ahmet Şahin (footballer) =

Turkish footballer

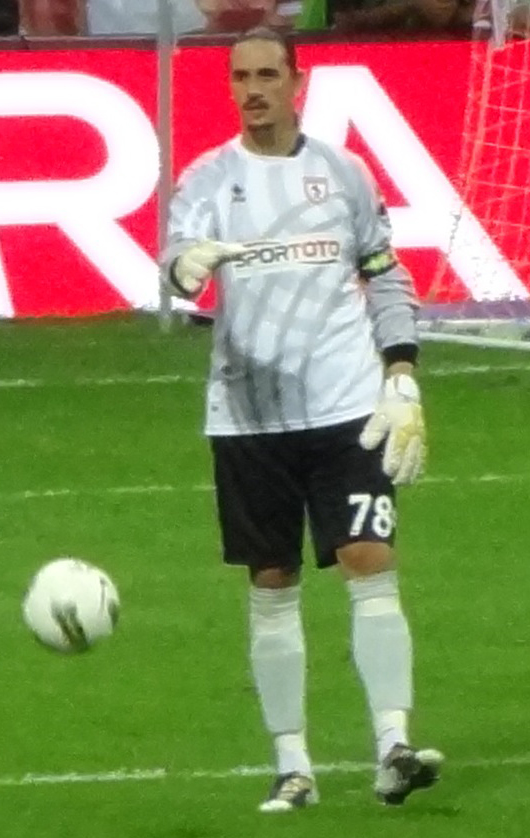

Personal information
- Date of birth: 22 March 1978 (age 48)
- Place of birth: Istanbul, Turkey
- Height: 1.90 m (6 ft 3 in)
- Position: Goalkeeper

Team information
- Current team: Kemerspor
- Number: 78

Youth career
- 1991–1996: Karagümrük
- 1997–1998: İstanbul Başakşehir

Senior career*
Years	Team	Apps	(Gls)
1996–1997	Karagümrük	18	(0)
1997–2001	İstanbul Başakşehir	15	(0)
2001–2003	Kocaelispor	36	(0)
2003–2004	Diyarbakırspor	4	(0)
2004–2005	İstanbul Başakşehir	34	(0)
2005–2008	Trabzonspor	10	(0)
2008–2009	Adanaspor	36	(0)
2009–2011	Samsunspor	54	(0)
2011–2012	Elazığspor	18	(0)
2012–2013	Balıkesirspor	11	(0)
2013–2014	Mersin	17	(0)
2014–2016	Osmanlıspor	62	(0)
2016–2018	Karabükspor	29	(0)
2018	Giresunspor	15	(0)
2019–	Kemerspor	13	(0)
- * Club domestic league appearances and goals as of 14:39, 16 May 2019 (UTC)

Ahmet Şahin (born 22 March 1978) is a Turkish footballer who plays as a goalkeeper for Kemerspor. He is currently the captain of Karabükspor, and is a well-known journeyman in Turkey who has played for various teams in various divisions of the Turkish footballing pyramid.

At Samsunspor, he was one of the team's key players during the 2011 season, and was a major factor in their victorious campaign in the Turkish second division.

== Honours ==
Kocaelispor

- Turkish Cup (1): 2002
