= Ufukhan Bayraktar =

Turkish professional footballer

Personal information
- Full name: Ufukhan Bayraktar
- Date of birth: 9 January 1986
- Place of birth: Arsin, Trabzon, Turkey
- Height: 1.75 m (5 ft 9 in)
- Position: Right wing back

Youth career
- 1999–2001: 24 Şubatspor
- 2001–2005: Trabzonspor

Senior career*
Years	Team	Apps	(Gls)
2005–2008	Trabzonspor	22	(0)
2007	→ Denizlispor (loan)	0	(0)
2008	→ Gaziantep B.B. (loan)	15	(0)
2008–2009	Manisaspor	7	(0)
2009	→ Çaykur Rizespor (loan)	12	(0)
2009–2010	Konyaspor	18	(2)
2010–2011	Altay	26	(2)
2011–2012	Karşıyaka	29	(2)
2012–2013	Kayseri Erciyesspor	7	(0)
2013	Adana Demirspor	12	(0)
2013–2015	Orduspor	30	(5)
2015–2016	Kocaeli Birlik Spor	25	(3)
2016–2017	Konya Anadolu Selçukspor	9	(0)
2017–2019	Manisa BB	68	(11)
2019	Vanspor FK	3	(0)

International career
2003–2004	Turkey U18	6	(0)
2004	Turkey U19	3	(1)
2005	Turkey U20	2	(0)
2006	Turkey U21	6	(0)
- * Club domestic league appearances and goals as of 18:37, 8 December 2019 (UTC)

Ufukhan Bayraktar (born 9 January 1986) is a Turkish professional footballer who most recently played as a right wingback for Vanspor FK.

Bayraktar is a former member of the Trabzonspor youth academy and has been capped at youth international levels.
