= Ceyhun Eriş =

Turkish footballer (born 1977)

Personal information
- Full name: Ceyhun Eriş
- Date of birth: 15 May 1977 (age 49)
- Place of birth: Istanbul, Turkey
- Height: 1.80 m (5 ft 11 in)
- Position: Attacking midfielder

Youth career
- Galatasaray

Senior career*
Years	Team	Apps	(Gls)
1995–1999	Galatasaray	3	(0)
1996–1997	→ Çaykur Rizespor (loan)	22	(3)
1997–1999	→ Göztepe (loan)	49	(17)
1999–2001	Siirtspor	54	(24)
2001–2003	Fenerbahçe	42	(8)
2004	MKE Ankaragücü	12	(1)
2004	Gençlerbirliği	3	(0)
2005	Konyaspor	25	(5)
2006	Samsunspor	15	(3)
2006–2007	MKE Ankaragücü	17	(3)
2007–2008	Trabzonspor	30	(7)
2008	Konyaspor	11	(1)
2008	FC Seoul	5	(0)
2009–2010	MKE Ankaragücü	23	(2)
2010	Denizlispor	0	(0)
2010	Assyriska FF	14	(6)
2010–2011	Sivasspor	15	(2)
2011	Denizlispor	9	(2)
2011–2012	Doğan Türk Birliği	11	(5)
2012	Assyriska FF	4	(1)

International career^{‡}
1996	Turkey U18	3	(1)
1996	Turkey U21	4	(0)
2003–2006	Turkey B	3	(3)
2009	Turkey	1	(0)
- * Club domestic league appearances and goals as of 17 February 2012 ‡ National team caps and goals as of 23 September 2010

Ceyhun Eriş (born 15 May 1977) is a Turkish retired professional footballer who played as an attacking midfielder.

== Club career ==
Eriş began his professional career with local club Galatasaray in 1995. He made his cup debut against Denizlispor on 14 December 1995, and made his league debut against the same club a week later. Çaykur Rizespor loaned the youngster for the 1996–97 season, where he made 27 appearances and scored three goals. After returning to Galatasaray, Eriş continued playing for the youth team. He was loaned out to Göztepe for two consecutive seasons, and left Galatasaray for Siirtspor in 1999. He made three appearances for the Istanbul-based club during his four-year tenure. After scoring 24 goals in 54 matches in the TFF Second League with Siirtspor, he moved to Fenerbahçe. Eriş spent two years with the club before transferring to MKE Ankaragücü in 2003. City rivals Gençlerbirliği transferred him the following season. He would continue moving clubs, playing for seven clubs over a five-year span from 2005 to 2010, transferring twice to Konyaspor and MKE Ankaragücü. He transferred to Sivasspor in 2010 and was transferred to Denizlispor in 2011.

== International career ==
He won his first international cap for Turkey at the age of 32, when he started a 2010 World Cup qualifier against Belgium on 10 October 2009.

== See also ==
- Ceyhun Eriş: "Gençler kendi önlerini açacak" (in Turkish) An extensive interview with the Turkish Football Federation website.
