= Ferhat Çökmüş =

Turkish footballer (born 1985)

Personal information
- Date of birth: 14 February 1985 (age 41)
- Place of birth: Bern, Switzerland
- Height: 1.80 m (5 ft 11 in)
- Position: Right back

Youth career
- 1990–1997: FC Ostermundigen
- 1997–2004: Young Boys

Senior career*
Years	Team	Apps	(Gls)
2005–2006	Young Boys U21	11	(1)
2005–2006	Young Boys	1	(0)
2006–2009	Trabzonspor	67	(2)
2009–2012	Manisaspor	63	(2)
2012–2013	Orduspor	20	(0)
2013–2015	Adana Demirspor	34	(1)
2015–2016	Wil	12	(0)
2015–2016	Wil II	3	(0)
2017–2020	Manisa Sanayi Spor		
2020	Donatim		

International career
2006	Turkey U21	3	(0)
2008	Turkey A2	1	(0)
- * Club domestic league appearances and goals as of 13 May 2016

Ferhat Çökmüş (born 14 February 1985) is a former footballer. Born in Switzerland, he represented Turkey at under-21 international level.

== Club career ==
He plays in either the rightback or defensive midfielder positions. Standing at 180 cm and weighing 75 kg, he has previously played for FC Ostermundigen, BSC Young Boys and Trabzonspor. His jersey number is 85. He holds both Turkish and Switzerland passports.
