= 2010 Turkish Super Cup =

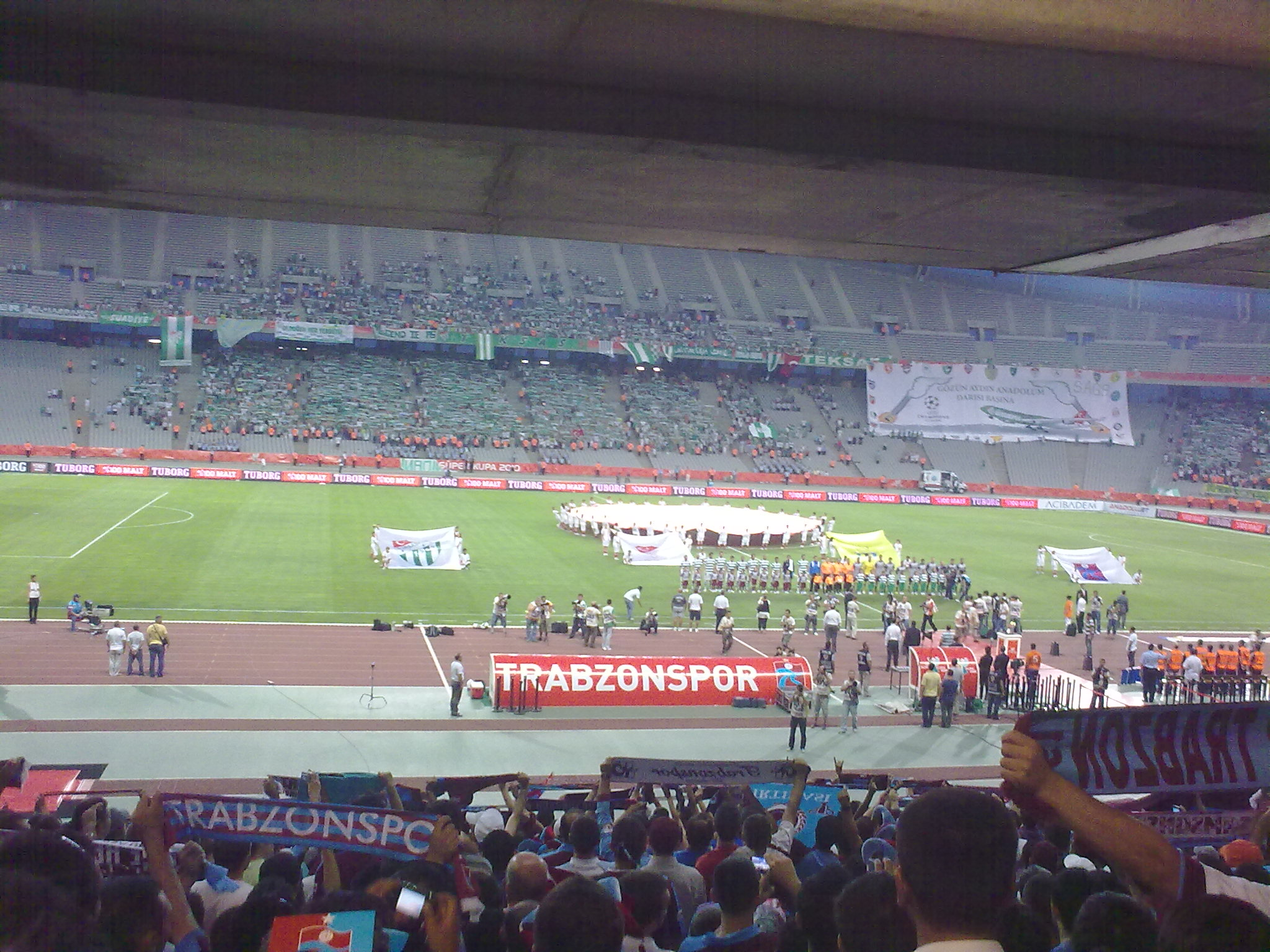
Bursaspor	Trabzonspor
0	3
- Date: August 7, 2010
- Venue: Atatürk Olympic Stadium, Istanbul
- Referee: Kuddusi Müftüoğlu

The 2010 Turkish Super Cup match was played between the Turkish Super League winner Bursaspor and the Turkish Cup winner Trabzonspor. Like the previous year the final was played at the Atatürk Olympic Stadium in Istanbul.
Trabzonspor won the game 3–0 after a hat-trick from Teófilo Gutiérrez.

== Match details ==
7 August 2010
20:30 EEST

Bursaspor	0–3	Trabzonspor
	Report (in Turkish)	Gutiérrez 55', 62', 72'

Atatürk Olympic Stadium, Istanbul
Referee: Kuddusi Müftüoğlu

Bursaspor	Trabzonspor

Bursaspor:
GK	27	(Bulgaria) Dimitar Ivankov
RB	21	(Turkey) Ali Tandoğan
CB	16	(Turkey) Ömer Erdoğan (c)		(substituted off) 75'
CB	38	(Turkey) İbrahim Öztürk
LB	3	(Turkey) Gökçek Vederson
RM	10	(Turkey) Volkan Şen	(yellow card) 69'
CM	25	(Serbia) Ivan Ergić
CM	13	(Argentina) Pablo Batalla		(substituted off) 63'
LM	20	(Turkey) Ozan İpek
CF	8	(Romania) Giani Kiriţă	(yellow card) 39'	(substituted off) 46'
CF	22	(Turkey) Turgay Bahadır
Substitutes:
GK	1	(Turkey) Yavuz Özkan
DF	2	(Turkey) Serdar Aziz		(substituted on) 75'
DF	18	(Turkey) Mustafa Keçeli
MF	6	(Turkey) Bekir Ozan Has		(substituted on) 46'
MF	11	(Turkey) Eren Albayrak
FW	9	(Turkey) Sercan Yıldırım		(substituted on) 63'
FW	24	(Turkey) Muhammet Demir
Manager:
(Turkey) Ertuğrul Sağlam

Trabzonspor:
GK	35	(Turkey) Onur Kıvrak
RB	30	(Turkey) Serkan Balcı
CB	4	(Poland) Arkadiusz Głowacki	(yellow card) 84'
CB	16	(Turkey) Egemen Korkmaz	(yellow card) 18'
LB	3	(Croatia) Hrvoje Čale	(yellow card) 5'
RM	6	(Turkey) Ceyhun Gülselam
CM	8	(Turkey) Selçuk İnan (c)	(yellow card) 33'
CM	20	(Argentina) Gustavo Colman
LM	25	(Brazil) Alanzinho		(substituted off) 79'
CF	17	(Turkey) Burak Yılmaz		(substituted off) 66'
CF	9	(Colombia) Teófilo Gutiérrez		(substituted off) 92'
Substitutes:
GK	29	(Turkey) Tolga Zengin
DF	23	(Turkey) Giray Kaçar		(substituted on) 92'
DF	66	(Turkey) Ferhat Öztorun
MF	11	(Turkey) Barış Memiş
MF	10	(Turkey) Umut Bulut
MF	21	(Turkey) Barış Ataş		(substituted on) 79'
FW	61	(Turkey) Ibrahim Yattara		(substituted on) 66'
Manager:
(Turkey) Şenol Güneş
