= Tolga Zengin =

Turkish retired football goalkeeper (born 1983)

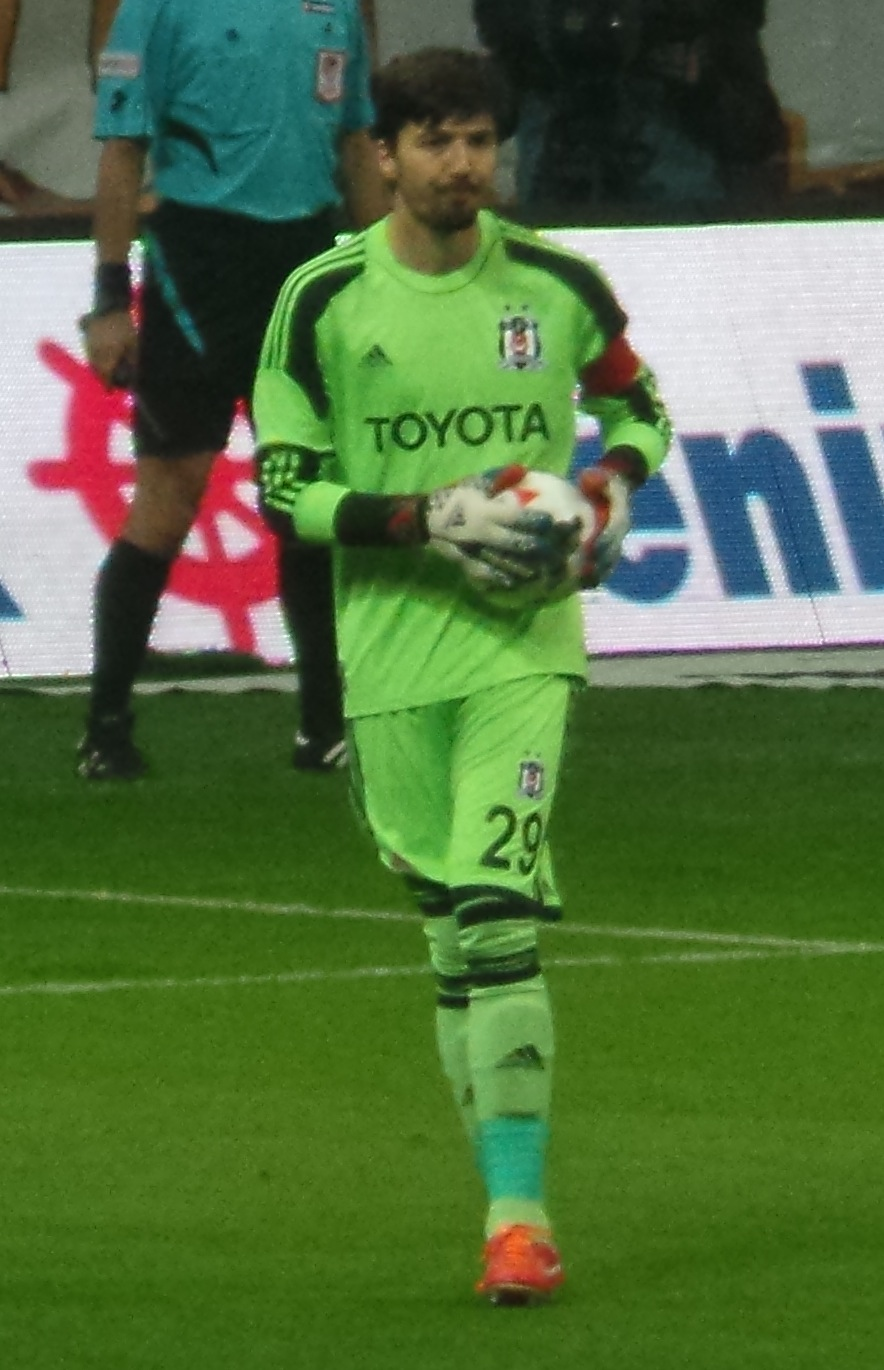
- Zengin in 2014

Personal information
- Date of birth: October 10, 1983 (age 43)
- Place of birth: Hopa, Artvin, Turkey
- Height: 1.92 m (6 ft 4 in)
- Position: Goalkeeper

Youth career
- 1995–1998: İdmanocağı
- 1998–2003: Trabzonspor

Senior career*
Years	Team	Apps	(Gls)
2003–2013	Trabzonspor	110	(0)
2013–2019	Beşiktaş	87	(0)
Total		197	(0)

International career
2004–2005	Turkey U21	3	(0)
2006	Turkey A2	1	(0)
2006–2014	Turkey	9	(0)
Medal record
Representing Turkey
Men's football
UEFA European Championship
Bronze medal – third place	2008 Austria & Switzerland
- * Club domestic league appearances and goals

Tolga Zengin (born October 10, 1983) is a Turkish retired football goalkeeper.

His impressive performances at the start of the 2006–07 season for Trabzonspor earned him a call-up to the Turkey national football team for a friendly against Luxembourg in August 2006.

Tolga was on the Turkish squad at UEFA Euro 2008. In response to several players being unable to play due to sanctions or injuries, manager Fatih Terim hinted that he might have been called up as a field player, a testimony to his versatility.

His most memorable performance was a UEFA Champions League group stage match against Internazionale in September 2011.

== Career statistics ==
=== Club ===
Appearances and goals by club, season and competition
Club	Season	League			Cup		Europe		Other		Total	
Club	Season	Division	Apps	Goals	Apps	Goals	Apps	Goals	Apps	Goals	Apps	Goals
Trabzonspor	2002–03	Süper Lig	0	0	—		—		—		0	0
Trabzonspor	2003–04	Süper Lig	0	0	0	0	0	0	—		0	0
Trabzonspor	2004–05	Süper Lig	0	0	0	0	0	0	—		0	0
Trabzonspor	2005–06	Süper Lig	7	0	0	0	0	0	—		7	0
Trabzonspor	2006–07	Süper Lig	18	0	0	0	0	0	—		18	0
Trabzonspor	2007–08	Süper Lig	22	0	0	0	1	0	—		23	0
Trabzonspor	2008–09	Süper Lig	8	0	0	0	0	0	—		8	0
Trabzonspor	2009–10	Süper Lig	1	0	1	0	0	0	—		2	0
Trabzonspor	2010–11	Süper Lig	9	0	3	0	0	0	0	0	12	0
Trabzonspor	2011–12	Süper Lig	40	0	0	0	11	0	—		51	0
Trabzonspor	2012–13	Süper Lig	5	0	8	0	0	0	—		13	0
Trabzonspor	Total		110	0	12	0	12	0	0	0	134	0
Beşiktaş	2013–14	Süper Lig	34	0	0	0	2	0	—		36	0
Beşiktaş	2014–15	Süper Lig	17	0	3	0	8	0	—		28	0
Beşiktaş	2015–16	Süper Lig	30	0	2	0	6	0	—		38	0
Beşiktaş	2016–17	Süper Lig	3	0	4	0	1	0	1	0	9	0
Beşiktaş	2017–18	Süper Lig	0	0	5	0	1	0	0	0	6	0
Beşiktaş	2018–19	Süper Lig	3	0	0	0	6	0	—		9	0
Beşiktaş	Total		87	0	14	0	24	0	1	0	126	0
Career total			197	0	26	0	36	0	1	0	260	0

=== International ===
Appearances and goals by national team and year
National team	Year	Apps	Goals
Turkey	2006	1	0
Turkey	2008	1	0
Turkey	2011	0	0
Turkey	2012	3	0
Turkey	2013	2	0
Turkey	2014	2	0
Total		9	0

== Honours ==
Trabzonspor

- Türkiye Kupası: 2009–10
- Süper Kupa: 2010

Beşiktaş

- Süper Lig (2): 2015–16, 2016–17

Turkey

- UEFA European Championship bronze medalist: 2008

Sporting positions
Preceded by (Guinea) Ibrahim Yattara	Trabzonspor captain 2011–2013	Succeeded by (Turkey) Onur Kıvrak
