= Ibrahim Yattara =

Guinean-Turkish footballer

İbrahim Yattara
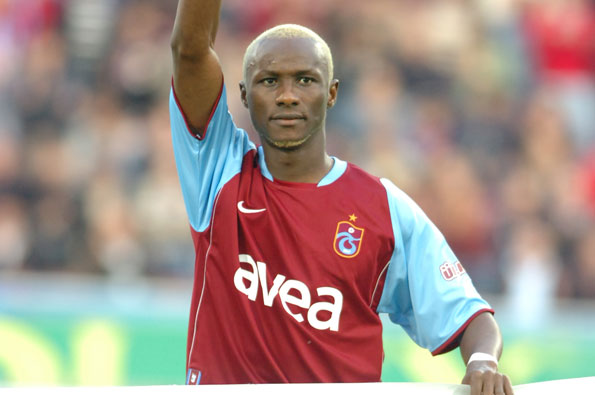

Personal information
- Full name: İbrahim Yattara
- Date of birth: 3 June 1980 (age 46)
- Place of birth: Kamsar, Guinea
- Height: 1.75 m (5 ft 9 in)
- Positions: Right winger; attacking midfielder

Senior career*
Years	Team	Apps	(Gls)
1998–1999	San Garedi	?	(?)
1999–2000	Athlético Coléah	?	(?)
2000–2003	Royal Antwerp	66	(10)
2003–2011	Trabzonspor	193	(32)
2011–2012	Al-Shabab	14	(4)
2012–2013	Mersin İdman Yurdu	4	(0)
2013–2014	UR La Louvière Centre	24	(3)
2022	Yeşil Çivril Belediyespor	1	(0)
2022-2023	Ortaköy Spor		
2023-2024	Yeniköy 1924		
2024	İmranlıspor		

International career
2002–2012	Guinea	37	(2)

Managerial career
- 2020–2021: İstanbulspor (assistant)
- * Club domestic league appearances and goals as of 6 March 2012

İbrahim Yattara (born 3 June 1980 in Kamsar), or İbrahim Üçüncü, is a Guinean former footballer.

He also once competed on Survivor Turkey.

== Career ==
Yattara began his career in his native Guinea with the team San Garedi. He moved on to Athlético de Coléah, another Guinean club before embarking on his career in Europe. He joined Antwerp FC in Belgium in 2000 and was used primarily on the right side of midfield. Yattara joined Trabzonspor in 2003.

He played international football for Guinea and was part of the Guinea squad for the 2004 and 2006 African Cup of Nations tournaments in Tunisia and Egypt.

== Playing style ==
Spanish coach Luis Aragones once stated that Yattara's playing style is very similar to Ronaldinho.

== Career statistics ==
As of 14 September 2010

=== Club ===
Club	Season	League		Cup		League Cup		Europe		Total	
Club	Season	Apps	Goals	Apps	Goals	Apps	Goals	Apps	Goals	Apps	Goals
Royal Antwerp	2000–01	9	0	-	-	-	-	-	-	9	0
Royal Antwerp	2001–02	30	6	-	-	-	-	-	-	30	6
Royal Antwerp	2002–03	29	4	-	-	-	-	-	-	29	4
Royal Antwerp	Total	68	10	0	0	0	0	0	0	68	10
Trabzonspor	2003–04	30	6	4	1	-	-	2	0	36	5
Trabzonspor	2004–05	28	8	4	0	-	-	5	2	37	10
Trabzonspor	2005–06	32	7	4	0	-	-	1	0	37	7
Trabzonspor	2006–07	18	2	4	1	-	-	2	1	24	4
Trabzonspor	2007–08	32	3	2	1	-	-	2	1	36	5
Trabzonspor	2008–09	27	3	3	0	-	-	-	-	30	3
Trabzonspor	2009–10	5	0	0	0	0	0	0	0	5	0
Trabzonspor	2010–11	14	3	1	1	1	0	2	0	18	4
Trabzonspor	Total	186	32	22	4	1	0	14	4	223	42
Career total		254	42	22	4	1	0	14	4	291	52

=== International goals ===
#	Date	Venue	Opponent	Score	Result	Competition
1.	5 September 2010	Addis Ababa Stadium, Addis Ababa, Ethiopia	Ethiopia	1–1	1–4	2012 Africa Cup of Nations qual.
2.	9 September 2012	Nongo Stadium, Conakry, Guinea	Niger	1–0	1–0	2013 Africa Cup of Nations qual.
Correct as of 6 September 2010

== Honours ==
Trabzonspor

- Turkish Cup: 2003–04, 2009–10
- Turkish Super Cup: 2010

Sporting positions
Preceded by Rigobert Song	Trabzonspor captain 2010–2011	Succeeded by Tolga Zengin
