= 2014–15 Galatasaray S.K. season =

Galatasaray
2014–15 season
- President: Duygun Yarsuvat (until 31 May 2015); Dursun Aydın Özbek (from 1 June 2015)
- Head coach: Cesare Prandelli (until 27 November 2014); Hamza Hamzaoğlu (from 1 December 2014)
- Stadium: Türk Telekom Arena
- Süper Lig: 1st
- Turkish Cup: Winners
- Turkish Super Cup: Runners-up
- UEFA Champions League: Group stage
- Top goalscorer: League: Burak Yılmaz (16); All: Burak Yılmaz (22)
- Highest home attendance: 47,348 vs Beşiktaş (Süper Lig, 24 May 2015)
- Lowest home attendance: 4,505 vs FBM Yaşamspor (Turkish Cup, 4 February 2015)
- Average home league attendance: 26,193
Home colours	Away colours	Third colours

The 2014–15 season was Galatasaray's 111th in existence and 57th consecutive season in the Süper Lig. The club were aiming for an unprecedented twentieth league title, after finishing in second place in the previous season.

In Europe, Galatasaray competed in the UEFA Champions League for a fourteenth season. They also competed in the Turkish Cup and the Turkish Super Cup.

This article shows statistics of the club's players in the season, and also lists all matches that the club played during the season. The season covered a period from 1 July 2014 to 30 June 2015.

== Club ==
=== Technical Staff ===
Position	Staff
Manager	(Turkey) Hamza Hamzaoğlu
Coach	(Turkey) Fuat Buruk
Coach	(Turkey) Yıldırım Uran
Coach	(Turkey) Serkan Selman
Goalkeeper Coach	(Brazil) Cláudio Taffarel
Youth Goalkeeper Coach	(Turkey) Metin Mert
Conditioner	(Turkey) Yasin Küçük
Chief Scout	(Turkey) Emre Utkucan
Chief Analyst	(Italy) Marco Fumagalli

=== Medical Staff ===
Position	Staff
Doctor	(Turkey) Yener İnce (Turkey) Gürbey Kahveci
Physiotherapist	(Turkey) Mustafa Korkmaz (Turkey) Burak Koca (Turkey) İlhan Er
Masseur	(Turkey) Cenk Akkaya (Turkey) Sedat Peker (Turkey) Mahmut Çalış (Turkey) Batuhan Erkan

=== Board of directors ===
Position	Staff
President	(Turkey) Duygun Yarsuvat
Vice-President	(Turkey) Hamdi Yasaman
Vice-President	(Turkey) Dursun Aydın Özbek
Vice-President	(Turkey) Abdurrahim Albayrak
	(Turkey) Mehmet İpekdokuyan
	(Turkey) Mehmet Can Topsakal
	(Turkey) Cem Kınay
	(Turkey) İsmail Sarıkaya
	(Turkey) Mete İkiz
	(Turkey) Ahmet Tunç Akan
	(Turkey) Ebru Köksal

Under the Presidency of Dursun Özbek

Position	Staff
President	(Turkey) Dursun Aydın Özbek
	(Turkey) Cengiz Özyalçın
	(Turkey) Nasuhi Sezgin
	(Turkey) Eşref Alaçayır
	(Turkey) Cüneyt Tanman
	(Turkey) Can Topsakal
	(Turkey) Fatih İşbecer
	(Turkey) Tayfun Demir
	(Turkey) İsmail Sarıkaya
	(Turkey) Ural Aküzüm
	(Turkey) Tarık Taşar

=== Grounds ===
Ground (capacity and dimensions)	Türk Telekom Arena (52,652 / 105x68m)
Training ground	Florya Metin Oktay Sports Complex and Training Center

=== Kit ===
Uniform Manufacturer: Nike

Chest Advertising's: Huawei (for League) / Turkish Airlines (for CL)

Back Advertising's: Ülker

Arm Advertising's: N/A

Short Advertising's: N/A

Home
Away
Third

Goalkeeper 1

Goalkeeper 2

Goalkeeper 3

== Sponsorship ==
Companies that Galatasaray S.K. had sponsorship deals with during the season included the following.

Licensee	Product
Huawei	Main Sponsor(Süper Lig)
Turkish Airlines	Main Sponsor(UEFA Champions League)
Nike	Technical Sponsor
Ülker	Cosponsor
Opel	Cosponsor
Turkish Airlines	Official Sponsor
Microsoft	Official Sponsor
Hedef Filo Hizmetleri	Official Sponsor
HDI-Gerling	Official Sponsor
Medical Park	Official Sponsor
Yandex	Official Sponsor
MNG Kargo	Official Sponsor
Sarar	Official Sponsor
Denizbank	Official Sponsor
W Collection	Official Sponsor
Fox International Channels	Media Sponsor
TTNET	Media Sponsor
Lukoil	Official Supplier
Diversey	Official Supplier
GNC	Official Supplier

== Season overview ==
- On 15 May 2014, it was announced that the Turkish Super Cup would be played on 25 August 2014 at Manisa.
- On 23 May 2014, it was announced that midfielder Selçuk İnan and striker Burak Yılmaz had extended their contracts until 2019.
- On 2 June 2014, it was announced that goalkeeper Fernando Muslera had extended his contract until 2018.
- On 11 June 2014, it was announced that the club had parted ways with manager Roberto Mancini.
- On 18 June 2014, Galatasaray revealed the pre-season summer camp schedule. The camp schedule for the Galatasaray professional football team prior to the next football season begam on Monday, 7 July at the Florya Metin Oktay Facilities. It was announced that Galatasaray would play two friendly matches against Bayer Leverkusen and Rapid Wien in Austria on 19 and 23 July, respectively.
- On 26 June 2014, it was announced that the club had extended their sponsorship agreement with technical sponsor Nike until 2024.
- On 30 June 2014, it was announced that Galatasaray had begun official negotiations regarding the transfer of Turkish professional football player Olcan Adın from Trabzonspor. It was reported that Olcan had signed a contract for four years. The original bid ny Galatasaray was reported as €4 million (plus defender Salih Dursun would be loaned to Trabzonspor for two seasons), with Olcan also receiving a salary of €1.6 million per year.
- On 2 July 2014, it was announced that defender Semih Kaya had extended his contract until 2018.
- On 3 July 2014, it was announced that Galatasaray had entered negotiations with former Italy coach Cesare Prandelli. Prandelli signed a contract for two years starting from the 2014–15 football season and would receive a salary of €2.295 million per year.
- On 8 July 2014, it was announced that young midfielder Kaan Baysal and winger Sinan Gümüş had been transferred from PSV Eindhoven and VfB Stuttgart, respectively. The contracts of both footballers had expired at their old clubs.
- On 10 July 2014, Izet Hajrović terminated his contract with Galatasaray and joined Werder Bremen on a four-year contract. Hajrović argued that he had not been paid his wages by the club and asked FIFA, the sport's governing body, to invalidate his contract. In response, on 18 July 2014 Galatasaray announced their decision to challenge this transfer by appealing to FIFA.
- On 11 July 2014, Galatasaray announced the 26-man squad for their pre-season summer camp in Austria. Manager Cesare Prandelli did not add ten players to the camp squad, who were either out of contract or transfer listed.
- On 15 July 2014, Galatasaray announced that the two forthcoming friendly matches against LASK and Bayer Leverkusen had been cancelled.
- On 16 July 2014, it was announced that goalkeeper Eray İşcan had extended his contract until 2018.
- On 17 July 2014, it was announced that midfielder Yekta Kurtuluş had extended his contract until 2017.
- On 18 July 2014, the home and away kits for the 2014–15 season were revealed.
- On 20 July 2014, it was announced that goalkeeper Sinan Bolat had joined Galatasaray on loan from Porto with a buyout clause.
- On 23 July 2014, it was announced that goalkeeper coach Cláudio Taffarel would be leaving the club to become the goalkeeping coach for the Brazil national team.
- On 25 July 2014, it was announced that defender Hakan Balta had extended his contract until 2016.
- On 5 August 2014, it was announced that Galatasaray had begun official negotiations regarding the transfer of Turkish professional football player Yasin Öztekin from Kayseri Erciyesspor. The original bid by Galatasaray was reported as €1.5 million, with Yasin also receiving a salary of €1 million per year.
- On 6 August 2014, it was announced that striker Sercan Yıldırım had been loaned out to Balıkesirspor for one year with a €1.3 million buyout clause.
- On 28 August 2014, it was announced that defender Dany Nounkeu had been loaned out to Granada for one year without a buyout clause.
- On 30 August 2014, it was announced that winger Lucas Ontivero had been loaned out to Gaziantepspor for the rest of the season with a €4.5 million buyout clause.
- On 30 August 2014, it was announced that midfielder Nordin Amrabat had been loaned out to Málaga for one year with a €3.5 million buyout clause.
- On 1 September 2014, it was announced that Galatasaray had begun official negotiations regarding the transfer of players Goran Pandev and Blerim Džemaili from Napoli. The original bid by Galatasaray was reported as €2.35 million for both players, with Pandev and Džemaili each also receiving a salary of €2.4 million per year.
- On 1 September 2014, it was announced that Galatasaray had begun official negotiations regarding the transfer of Turkish player Tarık Çamdal from Eskişehirspor. The original bid by Galatasaray was reported as €4.75 million, with Tarık also receiving a salary of €1.177 million per year.
- On 12 September 2014, Galatasaray announced a sponsorship agreement with Huawei and Turkish Airlines for the shirt sponsors in Süper Lig and Champions League matches, respectively. Huawei paid $4.13 million, and the Turkish Airlines paid €2.1 million for a one-year sponsorship.
- On 27 November 2014, Galatasaray announced the dismissal of head coach Cesare Prandelli. On the same day, it was announced that Galatasaray had entered negotiations with Turkey assistant coach Hamza Hamzaoğlu.
- On 12 December 2014, it was announced that Galatasaray had begun official negotiations regarding the transfer of Turkish player Furkan Özçal to Karabükspor.
- On 24 December 2014, it was announced that Galatasaray had loaned out Furkan Özçal to Karabükspor.
- On 16 January 2015, it was announced that Galatasaray had begun official negotiations regarding the transfer of Turkish player Veysel Sarı to Kasımpaşa.
- On 19 January 2015, it was announced that Galatasaray had sold Veysel Sarı to Kasımpaşa. The original bid of Kasımpaşa was reported as €0.4 million.
- On 22 January 2015, it was announced that Galatasaray had loaned out Dany Nounkeu to Evian.
- On 28 January 2015, it was announced that Galatasaray had loaned out Umut Gündoğan to Adana Demirspor for €150 thousand.
- On 25 May 2015, Galatasaray became champions of the Turkish Süper Lig.
- On 3 June 2015, Galatasaray won the Turkish Cup final against Bursaspor.

== Players ==
=== Squad information ===
N	Pos.	Nat.	Name	Age	EU	Since	App	Goals	Ends	Transfer fee	Notes
1	GK	(Uruguay)	Fernando Muslera	40	EU	2011	161	1	2018	€6.75M + Lorik Cana	
3	MF	(Brazil)	Felipe Melo	43	EU	2011	151	18	2016	€3.75M	
4	MF	(Turkey)	Hamit Altıntop	43	EU	2012	79	3	2016	€3.5M	
6	MF	(Switzerland)	Blerim Džemaili	40	EU	2014	20	1	2018	€2.35M	
8	MF	(Turkey)	Selçuk İnan (C)	41	Non-EU	2011	171	36	2019	Free	
9	FW	(Turkey)	Umut Bulut	43	Non-EU	2012	126	34	2016	€2.7M	
10	MF	(Netherlands)	Wesley Sneijder (VC)	42	EU	2013	102	35	2016	€7.5M	
11	MF	(Portugal)	Bruma	32	EU	2013	46	4	2018	€10M	
13	DF	(Brazil)	Alex Telles	33	Non-EU	2014	56	2	2018	€6.15M	
17	FW	(Turkey)	Burak Yılmaz	41	Non-EU	2012	120	72	2019	€5M	
18	MF	(Turkey)	Sinan Gümüş	32	EU	2014	9	1	2018	Free	
19	FW	(North Macedonia)	Goran Pandev	43	EU	2014	17	7	2016	Free	
21	DF	(Cameroon)	Aurélien Chedjou	40	EU	2013	67	8	2017	€6.3M	
22	DF	(Turkey)	Hakan Balta	43	EU	2007	261	11	2016	€1M + Ferhat Öztorun	
23	MF	(Turkey)	Yasin Öztekin	39	EU	2014	34	5	2018	€2.5M	
26	DF	(Turkey)	Semih Kaya	35	Non-EU	2008	144	1	2018	Youth system	
28	DF	(Turkey)	Koray Günter	32	EU	2014	25	0	2018	€2.5M	
29	MF	(Turkey)	Olcan Adın	41	Non-EU	2014	41	5	2018	€4M + Salih Dursun	
35	MF	(Turkey)	Yekta Kurtuluş	40	Non-EU	2011	89	7	2017	€3.75M	
38	GK	(Turkey)	Sinan Bolat	38	EU	2014	12	0	2015	Free	On loan from Porto
52	MF	(Turkey)	Emre Çolak	35	Non-EU	2009	146	14	2016	Youth system	
55	MF	(Turkey)	Sabri Sarıoğlu	42	Non-EU	2002	304	16	2015	Youth system	
67	GK	(Turkey)	Eray İşcan	35	Non-EU	2011	11	0	2015	Youth system	
77	DF	(Turkey)	Tarık Çamdal	35	EU	2014	23	0	2018	€4.75M	

- Last updated: 3 June 2015
- Source: Galatasaray.org, Players in / out, Wikipedia players' articles, and footballdatabase.com (for EU passport)
- Ordered by Last season starting 11 and position on pitch (from back right to front left).

=== Transfers ===
==== In ====
No.	Pos.	Nat.	Name	Age	EU	Moving from	Type	Transfer window	Ends	Transfer fee	Source
20	MF	(Portugal)	Bruma	32	EU	Gaziantepspor	Loan return	Summer	2014	N/A	
13	DF	(Cameroon)	Dany Nounkeu	40	EU	Beşiktaş	Loan return	Summer	2014	N/A	
53	MF	(Morocco)	Nordin Amrabat	39	EU	Málaga (Spain)	Loan return	Summer	2014	N/A	
23	MF	(Turkey)	Furkan Özçal	36	EU	Kardemir Karabükspor	Loan return	Summer	2014	N/A	
90	FW	(Turkey)	Sercan Yıldırım	36	Non-EU	Bursaspor	Loan return	Summer	2014	N/A	
50	MF	(Turkey)	Engin Baytar	43	EU	Çaykur Rizespor	Loan return	Summer	2014	N/A	
39	MF	(Turkey)	Yiğit Gökoğlan	37	Non-EU	Kayseri Erciyesspor	Loan return	Summer	2014	N/A	
38	GK	(Turkey)	Sinan Bolat	38	EU	Porto (Portugal)	Loan	Summer	2014	Free	Galatasaray.org
29	MF	(Turkey)	Olcan Adın	41	Non-EU	Trabzonspor	Transfer	Summer	2018	€4M + Salih Dursun	Galatasaray.org
23	MF	(Turkey)	Yasin Öztekin	39	EU	Kayseri Erciyesspor	Transfer	Summer	2017	€2.5M	Galatasaray.org
0	MF	(Turkey)	Kaan Baysal	30	EU	PSV (Netherlands)	Transfer	Summer	2018	Free	Galatasaray.org
18	MF	(Turkey)	Sinan Gümüş	32	EU	VfB Stuttgart (Germany)	Transfer	Summer	2018	Free	Galatasaray.org
77	DF	(Turkey)	Tarık Çamdal	35	EU	Eskişehirspor	Transfer	Summer	2018	€4.75M	Galatasaray.org
19	FW	(North Macedonia)	Goran Pandev	43	EU	Napoli (Italy)	Transfer	Summer	2016	Free	Galatasaray.org
6	MF	(Switzerland)	Blerim Džemaili	40	EU	Napoli (Italy)	Transfer	Summer	2017	€2.35M	Galatasaray.org
94	MF	(Argentina)	Lucas Ontivero	32	EU	Gaziantepspor	Loan return	Winter	2015	N/A	

Total spending: ▼€13.6M

==== Out ====
No.	Pos.	Nat.	Name	Age	EU	Moving to	Type	Transfer window	Transfer fee	Source
11	FW	(Ivory Coast)	Didier Drogba	48	EU	Chelsea (England)	End of Contract	Summer	N/A	Chelseafc.com
9	FW	(Sweden)	Johan Elmander	45	EU	Brøndby (Denmark)	End of Contract	Summer	N/A	NTVSpor.net
82	GK	(Turkey)	Aykut Erçetin	44	EU	Çaykur Rizespor	End of Contract	Summer	N/A	Eurosport.com.tr
86	GK	(Turkey)	Ufuk Ceylan	40	Non-EU	İstanbul Başakşehir	End of Contract	Summer	N/A	TRTHaber.com
6	MF	(Turkey)	Ceyhun Gülselam	38	EU	Hannover 96 (Germany)	End of Contract	Summer	N/A	
2	DF	(Argentina)	Guillermo Burdisso	38	EU	Boca Juniors	Loan return	Summer	N/A	
66	DF	(Turkey)	Salih Dursun	35	Non-EU	Trabzonspor	Loan	Summer	Free	Galatasaray.org
90	FW	(Turkey)	Sercan Yıldırım	36	Non-EU	Balıkesirspor	Loan	Summer	Free	Galatasaray.org
45	MF	(Turkey)	Oğuzhan Kayar	31	Non-EU	Manisaspor	Loan	Summer	Free	Galatasaray.org
13	DF	(Cameroon)	Dany Nounkeu	40	EU	Granada (Spain)	Loan	Summer	€0.39M	Galatasaray.org
53	MF	(Morocco)	Nordin Amrabat	39	EU	Málaga (Spain)	Loan	Summer	€1M	Galatasaray.org
94	MF	(Argentina)	Lucas Ontivero	32	EU	Gaziantepspor	Loan	Summer	Free	Galatasaray.org
41	FW	(Turkey)	Berk İsmail Ünsal	32	EU	Antalyaspor	Loan	Summer	N/A	Galatasaray.org
14	MF	(Bosnia and Herzegovina)	Izet Hajrović	35	EU	Werder Bremen (Germany)	Contract termination	Summer	Free	Werder.de
	FW	(Turkey)	Serdar Eylik	36	Non-EU	Samsunspor	Transfer	Summer	Undisclosed	Eurosport.com.tr
23	MF	(Turkey)	Furkan Özçal	36	EU	Kardemir Karabükspor	Loan	Winter	€0.45M	KAP.gov.tr
39	MF	(Turkey)	Yiğit Gökoğlan	37	Non-EU	Akhisar Belediyespor	Contract Termination	Winter	Free	KAP.gov.tr
88	DF	(Turkey)	Veysel Sarı	38	Non-EU	Kasımpaşa	Transfer	Winter	€0.4M	KAP.gov.tr
90	MF	(Turkey)	Umut Gündoğan	36	EU	Adana Demirspor	Loan	Winter	€0.15M	KAP.gov.tr
13	DF	(Cameroon)	Dany Nounkeu	40	EU	Evian (France)	Loan	Winter	N/A	KAP.gov.tr
94	MF	(Argentina)	Lucas Ontivero	32	EU	Honvéd	Loan	Winter	Free	KAP.gov.tr
40	DF	(Turkey)	Emre Can Coşkun	32	Non-EU	Denizlispor	Loan	Winter	€0.02M	KAP.gov.tr
44	FW	(Turkey)	Hüseyin Altuğ Taş	30	Non-EU	İstanbul Başakşehir	Transfer	Winter	N/A	NTVSpor.net
50	MF	(Turkey)	Engin Baytar	43	EU		Contract termination	Winter	N/A	Eurosport.com

Total income: ▲€2.41M

Expenditure: ▼€11.19M

== Competitions ==
=== Overall ===
Trophy	Started round	First match	Result	Last match
Süper Lig	—	30 August 2014	Winners	30 May 2015
Turkish Cup	Group stage	3 December 2014	Winners	3 June 2015
Turkish Super Cup	Final	25 August 2014	Runners-up	
Champions League	Group stage	16 September 2014	Group stage (4th)	9 December 2014

=== Pre-season, mid-season and friendlies ===
21 July 2014 Friendly	SK Vorwärts Steyr	1–3	Galatasaray	Steyr, Austria
20:30 EEST	Peham 29'		Kurtuluş 14'; Amrabat 35', 64'	Stadium: Vorwärts Stadium

23 July 2014 Friendly	Rapid Wien	3–1	Galatasaray	Vienna, Austria
21:30 EEST	Wydra 28'; Behrendt 52'; Alar 90'		Chedjou 27'	Stadium: Ernst-Happel-Stadion

27 July 2014 Friendly	Honvéd	1–2	Galatasaray	Budapest, Hungary
18:00 EEST	Vernes 90'		B. Yılmaz 36', 50' (pen.)	Stadium: Bozsik Stadion

6 August 2014 Friendly	Galatasaray	0–0	Atlético Madrid	İzmir, Turkey
21:30 EEST				Stadium: İzmir Atatürk Stadium

17 August 2014 Friendly	White Star Bruxelles	0–1	Galatasaray	Brussels, Belgium
19:00 EEST			Amrabat 82'	Stadium: Stade Edmond Machtens

17 January 2015 International Royal Cup	River Plate	1–1 (7–6 p)	Galatasaray	Antalya, Turkey
20:00 EEST	Molina Díaz 87'	Report	Pandev 41'	Referee: Mustafa Öğretmenoğlu

18 January 2015 International Royal Cup	Guaratinguetá	0–6	Galatasaray	Antalya, Turkey
16:00 EEST		Report	Çolak 10'; Bruma 13'; Coşkun 30'; Altıntop 73'; Gümüş 77'; Öztekin 87'	Referee: Özkan Çeliker

29 March 2015 Friendly	Galatasaray	0–2	Panthrakikos	Istanbul, Turkey
13:00 EEST		Report	Diguiny 45'; Igor 60' (pen.)	Stadium: Florya Metin Oktay Sports Complex and Training Center

=== Turkish Super Cup ===
25 August 2014 Final	Galatasaray	0–0 (2–3 p)	Fenerbahçe	Manisa
		Report		Stadium: Manisa 19 Mayıs Stadium; Referee: Mustafa Kamil Abitoğlu
	Penalties
	Adın (penalty scored); İnan (penalty missed); Melo (penalty missed); Kurtuluş (penalty missed); B. Yılmaz (penalty scored)		Kuyt (penalty scored); Erkin (penalty missed); Topuz (penalty missed); Meireles (penalty scored); Kadlec (penalty scored)

Source: Competitive Matches

=== Süper Lig ===
==== League table ====
Pos	Team	Pld	W	D	L	GF	GA	GD	Pts	Qualification or relegation
1	Galatasaray (C)	34	24	5	5	60	35	+25	77	Qualification for the Champions League group stage
2	Fenerbahçe	34	22	8	4	60	29	+31	74	Qualification for the Champions League third qualifying round
3	Beşiktaş	34	21	6	7	55	32	+23	69	Qualification for the Europa League group stage
4	Başakşehir	34	15	14	5	49	30	+19	59	Qualification for the Europa League third qualifying round
5	Trabzonspor	34	15	12	7	58	48	+10	57 (Note: Trabzonspor finished ahead of Bursaspor on head-to-head record: Trabzonspor–Bursaspor 1–0, Bursaspor–Trabzonspor 3–3.)	Qualification for the Europa League second qualifying round

Source: Süper Lig
Rules for classification: 1) points; 2) head-to-head points; 3) head-to-head goal difference; 4) goal difference; 5) number of goals scored (It is also decided that only criteria 1, 4 and 5 would be applied to establish the classification during the competition)
(C) Champions

==== Results summary ====
Overall								Home						Away					
Pld	W	D	L	GF	GA	GD	Pts	W	D	L	GF	GA	GD	W	D	L	GF	GA	GD
34	24	5	5	60	35	+25	77	13	3	1	32	17	+15	11	2	4	28	18	+10

Source: Competitive Matches

==== Results by round ====
Round	1	2	3	4	5	6	7	8	9	10	11	12	13	14	15	16	17	18	19	20	21	22	23	24	25	26	27	28	29	30	31	32	33	34
Ground	A	H	A	H	A	H	A	H	A	H	A	H	A	H	A	A	H	H	A	H	A	H	A	H	A	H	A	H	A	H	A	H	H	A
Result	W	D	L	W	W	W	L	W	W	L	W	W	W	W	D	W	W	D	W	W	W	W	L	D	W	W	L	W	W	W	W	W	W	D
Position	1	1	9	5	3	2	5	2	2	3	2	2	2	2	3	3	3	3	3	3	1	1	1	2	1	1	3	2	2	1	1	1	1	1

Source: Competitive matches
A = Away; H = Home; W = Win; D = Draw; L = Loss

==== Matches ====
30 August 2014 1	Bursaspor	0–2	Galatasaray	Bursa
19:00 EEST		Report	B. Yılmaz 52'; Adın 90'	Stadium: Bursa Atatürk Stadium; Attendance: 11,500; Referee: Halis Özkahya

13 September 2014 2	Galatasaray	0–0	Eskişehirspor	Istanbul
20:00EEST		Report		Stadium: Türk Telekom Arena; Attendance: 0 Referee: Barış Şimşek

20 September 2014 3	Balıkesirspor	2–0	Galatasaray	Balıkesir
20:00 EEST	Yıldırım 22'; Ünal 44'	Report		Stadium: Balıkesir Atatürk Stadium; Attendance: 11,600; Referee: Çağatay Şahan

26 September 2014 4	Galatasaray	2–1	Sivasspor	Istanbul
20:00 EEST	Chedjou 19'; B. Yılmaz 32'	Report	Chrisantus 70'	Stadium: Türk Telekom Arena; Attendance: 15,300; Referee: Volkan Bayarslan

4 October 2014 5	Kayseri Erciyesspor	1–2	Galatasaray	Kayseri
18:30 EEST	Osmanpaşa 81'	Report	B. Yılmaz 52'; Sneijder 67'	Stadium: Kadir Has Stadium; Attendance: 5,000; Referee: Mustafa İlker Coşkun

18 October 2014 6	Galatasaray	2–1	Fenerbahçe	Istanbul
19:00 EEST	Sneijder 88', 90'	Report	Potuk 90'	Stadium: Türk Telekom Arena; Attendance: 37,598; Referee: Cüneyt Çakır

26 October 2014 7	İstanbul Başakşehir	4–0	Galatasaray	Istanbul
19:00 EEST	Márcio Mossoró 16', 69'; Şentürk 20'; Doka Madureira 76'	Report		Stadium: Başakşehir Arena; Attendance: 6,000; Referee: Tolga Özkalfa

31 October 2014 8	Galatasaray	2–1	Kasımpaşa	Istanbul
20:00 EEST	B. Yılmaz 53'; Bulut 90'	Report	Büyük 41'	Stadium: Türk Telekom Arena; Attendance: 11,020; Referee: Hüseyin Göçek

8 November 2014 9	Karabükspor	1–2	Galatasaray	Karabük
18:00 EEST	Güngör 57'	Report	Chedjou 3'; Bulut 71'	Stadium: Dr. Necmettin Şeyhoğlu Stadium; Referee: Barış Şimşek

22 November 2014 10	Galatasaray	0–3	Trabzonspor	Istanbul
19:00 EEST		Report	Medjani 58', 76'; Erdoğan 86'	Stadium: Türk Telekom Arena; Attendance: 24,060; Referee: Mustafa İlker Coşkun

29 November 2014 11	Gaziantepspor	0–1	Galatasaray	Gaziantep
19:00 EEST		Report	B. Yılmaz 90'	Stadium: Kamil Ocak Stadium; Referee: Özgür Yankaya

5 December 2014 12	Galatasaray	2–1	Akhisar Belediyespor	Istanbul
20:00 EEST	B. Yılmaz 14', 75'	Report	Gekas 87'	Stadium: Türk Telekom Arena; Attendance: 16.000; Referee: Bülent Yıldırım

13 December 2014 13	Konyaspor	0–5	Galatasaray	Konya
19:00 EEST		Report	Bulut 16'; Çolak 23'; B. Yılmaz 37', 58'; Altıntop 62'	Stadium: New Konya Stadium; Attendance: 37,100; Referee: Süleyman Abay

20 December 2014 14	Galatasaray	3–2	Mersin İdman Yurdu	Istanbul
19:00 EEST	Varol 18' (o.g.); B. Yılmaz 55' (pen.); Bulut 79'	Report	Varol 9'; Mitrović 26' (pen.)	Stadium: Türk Telekom Arena; Attendance: 21,961; Referee: Fırat Aydınus

26 December 2014 15	Gençlerbirliği	1–1	Galatasaray	Ankara
20:00 EEST	Stancu 71'	Report	Çolak 19'	Stadium: Ankara 19 Mayıs Stadium; Attendance: 4,750; Referee: Mete Kalkavan

4 January 2015 16	Beşiktaş	0–2	Galatasaray	Istanbul
19:00 EEST		Report	Melo 50'; B. Yılmaz 90+5'	Stadium: Atatürk Olympic Stadium; Attendance: 28,260; Referee: Cüneyt Çakır

25 January 2015 17	Galatasaray	2–0	Çaykur Rizespor	Istanbul
19:00 EEST	Sneijder 7'; Bruma 44'	Report		Stadium: Türk Telekom Arena; Attendance: 20,345; Referee: İlker Meral

1 February 2015 18	Galatasaray	2–2	Bursaspor	Istanbul
20:00 EEST	Bulut 19'; Çolak 82' (pen.)	Report	Şen 45'; Fernandão 53'	Stadium: Türk Telekom Arena; Attendance: 27,778; Referee: Fırat Aydınus

9 February 2015 19	Eskişehirspor	1–2	Galatasaray	Eskişehir
20:00 EEST	Sissoko 27'	Report	Bulut 20'; İnan 87'	Stadium: Eskişehir Atatürk Stadium; Attendance: 3,000; Referee: Halis Özkahya

16 February 2015 20	Galatasaray	3–1	Balıkesirspor	Istanbul
20:00 EEST	Chedjou 16'; Sneijder 26'; B. Yılmaz 31'	Report	Zec 80'	Stadium: Türk Telekom Arena; Attendance: 8,250; Referee: Mustafa İlker Coşkun

21 February 2015 21	Sivasspor	2–3	Galatasaray	Sivas
20:00 EEST	Chahechouhe 39'; Akın 85'	Report	Öztekin 9'; B. Yılmaz 56'; Telles 67'	Stadium: Sivas 4 Eylül Stadium; Attendance: 10,000; Referee: Hüseyin Göcek

27 February 2015 22	Galatasaray	3–1	Kayseri Erciyesspor	Istanbul
20:00 EEST	Bulut 5'; Chedjou 53'; Sneijder 90'	Report	Vleminckx 31'	Stadium: Türk Telekom Arena; Attendance: 26,000; Referee: Tolga Özkalfa

8 March 2015 23	Fenerbahçe	1–0	Galatasaray	Istanbul
19:00 EEST	Kuyt 81'	Report		Stadium: Şükrü Saracoğlu Stadium; Attendance: 52,500; Referee: Cüneyt Çakır

14 March 2015 24	Galatasaray	2–2	İstanbul Başakşehir	Istanbul
19:00 EEST	İnan 43'; Bulut 49'	Report	Batdal 79'; Şahin 85'	Stadium: Türk Telekom Arena; Attendance: 26,250; Referee: Bülent Yıldırım

21 March 2015 25	Kasımpaşa	2–3	Galatasaray	Istanbul
19:00 EEST	Castro 16'; Torun 43'	Report	İnan 52'; Bulut 55'; B. Yılmaz 65'	Stadium: Recep Tayyip Erdoğan Stadium; Attendance: 8,000; Referee: Hüseyin Göçek

5 April 2015 26	Galatasaray	4–2	Karabükspor	Istanbul
16:00 EEST	Öztekin 26'; Sneijder 48', 90'; Bulut 59'	Report	Balta 71' (o.g.); Özçal 86'	Stadium: Türk Telekom Arena; Attendance: 34,536; Referee: Tolga Özkalfa

19 April 2015 27	Trabzonspor	2–1	Galatasaray	Trabzon
19:00 EEST	Hurmacı 20'; Yatabaré 85'	Report	Çolak 67'	Stadium: Avni Aker Stadium; Attendance: 17,500; Referee: Ali Palabıyık

26 April 2015 28	Galatasaray	1–0	Gaziantepspor	Istanbul
19:00 EEST	Balta 85'	Report		Stadium: Türk Telekom Arena; Attendance: 27,570; Referee: Mete Kalkavan

4 May 2015 29	Akhisar Belediyespor	0–2	Galatasaray	Manisa
20:00 EEST		Report	B. Yılmaz 22', 34'	Stadium: Manisa 19 Mayıs Stadium; Attendance: 9,000; Referee: Mustafa Kamil Abitoğlu

8 May 2015 30	Galatasaray	1–0	Konyaspor	Istanbul
20:00 EEST	İnan 84'	Report		Stadium: Türk Telekom Arena; Attendance: 27,300; Referee: Barış Şimşek

12 May 2015 31	Mersin İdman Yurdu	0–1	Galatasaray	Mersin
19:45 EEST		Report	Öztekin 16'	Stadium: Mersin Arena; Attendance: 16,500; Referee: Ali Palabıyık

16 May 2015 32	Galatasaray	1–0	Gençlerbirliği	Istanbul
20:00 EEST	Sneijder 67'	Report		Stadium: Türk Telekom Arena; Attendance: 37,105; Referee: Halis Özkahya

24 May 2015 33	Galatasaray	2–0	Beşiktaş	Istanbul
20:00 EEST	Öztekin 11'; Sneijder 80'	Report		Stadium: Türk Telekom Arena; Attendance: 47,348; Referee: Hüseyin Göçek

31 May 2015 34	Çaykur Rizespor	1–1	Galatasaray	Rize
13:00 EEST	Albayrak 52'	Report	Bulut 86'	Stadium: Yeni Rize Şehir Stadı; Referee: Mustafa Kamil Abitoğlu

=== Turkish Cup ===
3 December 2014 Group stage	Galatasaray	4–2	Eskişehirspor	Istanbul
19:30 EEST	İnan 15', 36' (pen.); Bruma 83'; Bulut 89'	Report	Özkan 5'; Şentürk 61'	Stadium: Türk Telekom Arena; Attendance: 5,650; Referee: Ali Palabıyık

16 December 2014 Group stage	FBM Yaşamspor	1–9	Galatasaray	İzmir
20:30 EEST	Yeğin 10'	Report	Pandev 27', 39', 45'; Altıntop 32' (pen.); Adın 41', 82'; Gümüş 62'; Kurtuluş 80', 90'	Stadium: İzmir Atatürk Stadium; Attendance: 23,500; Referee: Sarper Barış Saka

23 December 2014 Group stage	Diyarbakır Büyükşehir Belediyespor	1–4	Galatasaray	Diyarbakır
17:00 EEST	Koç 43'	Report	Pandev 31'; Bruma 69'; Adın 81'; Kurtuluş 84'	Stadium: Diyarbakır Atatürk Stadium; Attendance: 6,000; Referee: Yunus Yıldırım

22 January 2015 Group stage	Galatasaray	0–2	Diyarbakır Büyükşehir Belediyespor	Istanbul
20:30 EEST		Report	Çspar 3'; Yağmur 90'	Stadium: Türk Telekom Arena; Attendance: 6,710; Referee: Volkan Bayarslan

28 January 2015 Group stage	Eskişehirspor	1–0	Galatasaray	Eskişehir
20:00 EEST	Güleryüz 40'	Report		Stadium: Eskişehir Atatürk Stadium; Attendance: 15,000; Referee: Barış Şimşek

4 February 2015 Group stage	Galatasaray	3–1	FBM Yaşamspor	Istanbul
20:00 EEST	Öztekin 33'; Aksoy 60' (o.g.); Pandev 74'	Report	Say 13'	Stadium: Türk Telekom Arena; Attendance: 4,505; Referee: Abdulkadir Bitigen

==== Standings ====
Pos	Team	Pld	W	D	L	GF	GA	GD	Pts	GAL	ESK	DBB	FBM
1	Galatasaray	6	4	0	2	20	8	+12	12		4–2	0–2	3–1
2	Eskişehirspor	6	4	0	2	11	6	+5	12	1–0		3–0	3–0
3	Diyarbakır B.B.	6	2	2	2	7	10	−3	8	1–4	1–0		2–2
4	FBM Yaşamspor	6	0	2	4	6	20	−14	2	1–9	1–2	1–1	

Legend: Blue = home team win; Yellow = draw; Red = away team win.

12 February 2015 Round of 16	Galatasaray	4–1	Konyaspor	Istanbul
19:00 EEST	B. Yılmaz 10'; Sneijder 16', 34'; Adın 45'	Report	Marica 20'	Stadium: Türk Telekom Arena; Attendance: 7,500; Referee: İlker Meral

3 March 2015 Quarter-finals 1st Leg	Galatasaray	4–0	Manisaspor	Istanbul
20:30 EEST	Džemaili 34'; Çolak 40' (pen.); Pandev 68', 88'	Report		Stadium: Türk Telekom Arena; Attendance: 11,366; Referee: Mustafa Kamil Abitoğlu

15 April 2015 Quarter-finals 2nd Leg	Manisaspor	1–1	Galatasaray	Manisa
19:45 EEST	Turan 76'	Report	Kurtuluş 1'	Stadium: Manisa 19 Mayıs Stadium; Attendance: 5,500; Referee: Alper Ulusoy

30 April 2015 Semi-finals 1st Leg	Galatasaray	4–1	Sivasspor	Istanbul
20:30 EEST	Sarıoğlu 32'; Melo 35'; Sneijder 64'; İnan 77' (pen.)	Report	Utaka 9'	Stadium: Türk Telekom Arena; Attendance: 19,196; Referee: İlker Meral

19 May 2015 Semi-finals 2nd Leg	Sivasspor	2–1	Galatasaray	Sivas
20:30 EEST	Karadeniz 69', 73'	Report	Çolak 84' (pen.)	Stadium: Sivas 4 Eylül Stadium; Attendance: 11,000; Referee: Mustafa İlker Coşkun

==== Final ====
The final was contested in a neutral ground as a one-off match.

3 June 2015 Final	Galatasaray	3–2	Bursaspor	Bursa
20:30 EEST	B. Yılmaz 40', 48', 60'	Report	Fernandão 27' (pen.); Şen 58'	Stadium: Bursa Atatürk Stadium; Referee: Bülent Yıldırım

=== UEFA Champions League ===
==== Group stage ====
Pos	Team	Pld	W	D	L	GF	GA	GD	Pts	Qualification	DOR	ARS	AND	GAL
1	(Germany) Borussia Dortmund	6	4	1	1	14	4	+10	13	Advance to knockout phase	—	2–0	1–1	4–1
2	(England) Arsenal	6	4	1	1	15	8	+7	13	Advance to knockout phase	2–0	—	3–3	4–1
3	(Belgium) Anderlecht	6	1	3	2	8	10	−2	6	Transfer to Europa League	0–3	1–2	—	2–0
4	(Turkey) Galatasaray	6	0	1	5	4	19	−15	1		0–4	1–4	1–1	—

Source: UEFA
Rules for classification: Group stage tiebreakers

16 September 2014 1	Galatasaray (Turkey)	1–1	(Belgium) Anderlecht	Istanbul, Turkey
20:45 CET	B. Yılmaz 90+1'	Report	Praet 52'	Stadium: Türk Telekom Arena; Attendance: 28.553; Referee: István Vad (Hungary)

1 October 2014 2	Arsenal (England)	4–1	(Turkey) Galatasaray	London, United Kingdom
20:45 CET	Welbeck 22', 30', 52'; Sánchez 41'	Report	B. Yılmaz 63' (pen.)	Stadium: Emirates Stadium; Attendance: 59.803; Referee: Gianluca Rocchi (Italy)

22 October 2014 3	Galatasaray (Turkey)	0–4	(Germany) Borussia Dortmund	Istanbul, Turkey
20:45 CET		Report	Aubameyang 6', 18'; Reus 41'; Ramos 83'	Stadium: Türk Telekom Arena; Attendance: 36.324; Referee: Antonio Mateu Lahoz (Spain)

4 November 2014 4	Borussia Dortmund (Germany)	4–1	(Turkey) Galatasaray	Dortmund, Germany
20:45 CET	Reus 39'; Papastathopoulos 56'; Immobile 74'; Kaya 85' (o.g.)	Report	Balta 70'	Stadium: Signal Iduna Park; Attendance: 65.851; Referee: Pavel Královec (Czech Republic)

26 November 2014 5	Anderlecht (Belgium)	2–0	(Turkey) Galatasaray	Anderlecht, Brussels
20:45 CET	Mbemba 44', 86'	Report		Stadium: Constant Vanden Stock Stadium; Attendance: 19.857; Referee: Ivan Bebek (Croatia)

9 December 2014 6	Galatasaray (Turkey)	1–4	(England) Arsenal	Istanbul, Turkey
20:45 CET	Sneijder 89'	Report	Podolski 3', 90'; Ramsey 11', 29'	Stadium: Türk Telekom Arena; Attendance: 20.590; Referee: David Fernández Borbalán (Spain)

== Statistics ==
=== Squad statistics ===
No.	Pos.	Name	League		Turkish Cup		Super Cup		Champions League		Total		Discipline		Minutes
No.	Pos.	Name	Apps	Goals	Apps	Goals	Apps	Goals	Apps	Goals	Apps	Goals	Yellow card	Red card	Total
1	GK	(Uruguay) Fernando Muslera	32	0	1	0	1	0	5	0	39	0	4	0	3540
38	GK	(Turkey) Sinan Bolat	2	0	9	0	0	0	1	0	12	0	1	0	1080
67	GK	(Turkey) Eray İşcan	0	0	2	0	0	0	0	0	2	0	0	0	180
28	DF	(Turkey) Koray Günter	12	0	7	0	0	0	0	0	19	0	1	1	1507
21	DF	(Cameroon) Aurélien Chedjou	26	4	3	0	1	0	5	0	35	4	8	0	3150
22	DF	(Turkey) Hakan Balta	21	1	7	0	1	0	2	1	31	2	6	0	2343
15	DF	(Brazil) Alex Telles	21	1	8	0	1	0	5	0	35	1	5	0	2870
88	DF	(Turkey) ~~Veysel Sarı~~	5	0	2	0	1	0	2	0	10	0	2	0	754
77	DF	(Turkey) Tarık Çamdal	12	0	7	0	0	0	5	0	24	0	4	0	1914
55	DF	(Turkey) Sabri Sarıoğlu	25	0	6	1	0	0	0	0	31	1	4	0	2626
26	DF	(Turkey) Semih Kaya	19	0	6	0	1	0	6	0	32	0	5	0	2791
40	DF	(Turkey) ~~Emre Can Coşkun~~	0	0	3	0	0	0	0	0	3	0	0	0	128
4	MF	(Turkey) Hamit Altıntop	22	1	4	1	0	0	5	0	30	2	4	0	1894
8	MF	(Turkey) Selçuk İnan	32	4	7	3	1	0	4	0	44	7	8	1	3823
3	MF	(Brazil) Felipe Melo	20	1	7	1	1	0	6	0	34	2	18	1	2870
52	MF	(Turkey) Emre Çolak	25	4	9	2	0	0	2	0	36	6	3	0	1856
20	MF	(Turkey) ~~Furkan Özçal~~	0	0	1	0	0	0	1	0	2	0	0	0	61
6	MF	(Switzerland) Blerim Džemaili	11	0	5	1	0	0	4	0	20	1	7	0	1330
35	MF	(Turkey) Yekta Kurtuluş	15	0	9	4	1	0	1	0	25	4	6	0	1350
43	MF	(Turkey) Birhan Vatansever	0	0	1	0	0	0	0	0	1	0	0	0	8
90	MF	(Turkey) ~~Umut Gündoğan~~	0	0	1	0	0	0	0	0	1	0	1	0	90
29	MF	(Turkey) Olcan Adın	28	1	11	4	1	0	1	0	41	5	12	0	1641
27	MF	(Turkey) Yasin Öztekin	20	4	10	1	1	0	3	0	34	5	3	0	1946
7	MF	(Turkey) Aydın Yılmaz	1	0	4	0	0	0	0	0	5	0	0	0	132
18	MF	(Turkey) Sinan Gümüş	4	0	6	1	0	0	0	0	10	1	2	0	340
20	MF	(Portugal) Bruma	20	1	8	2	1	0	4	0	33	3	2	0	2014
10	MF	(Netherlands) Wesley Sneijder	31	10	6	3	1	0	6	1	44	14	6	0	3637
17	FW	(Turkey) Burak Yılmaz	28	16	2	4	1	0	6	2	37	22	8	0	2958
9	FW	(Turkey) Umut Bulut	33	11	5	1	0	0	5	0	43	12	3	0	2285
19	FW	(North Macedonia) Goran Pandev	2	0	10	7	0	0	3	0	16	7	1	0	926
–	–	Own goals	–	1	–	1	–	0	–	0	–	2	–	–	–

Statistics accurate as of 3 June 2015.

=== Goals ===
Includes all competitive matches. In the case of a tie in Total number of goals, players with more goals in Champions League are ranked higher, followed by league, Super Cup and Turkish Cup goals respectively. If all stats are the same, then the younger player is ranked higher.

Last updated on 30 May 2015

Position	Nation	Number	Name	League	Champions League	Turkish Cup	Super Cup	Total
1	(Turkey)	17	Burak Yılmaz	16	2	4	0	22
2	(Netherlands)	10	Wesley Sneijder	10	1	3	0	14
2	(Turkey)	9	Umut Bulut	11	0	1	0	12
3	(Turkey)	8	Selçuk İnan	4	0	3	0	7
3	(North Macedonia)	19	Goran Pandev	0	0	7	0	7
4	(Turkey)	52	Emre Çolak	4	0	2	0	6
5	(Turkey)	23	Yasin Öztekin	4	0	1	0	5
5	(Turkey)	29	Olcan Adın	1	0	4	0	5
6	(Cameroon)	21	Aurélien Chedjou	4	0	0	0	4
6	(Turkey)	35	Yekta Kurtuluş	0	0	4	0	4
7	(Portugal)	11	Bruma	1	0	2	0	3
8	(Turkey)	22	Hakan Balta	1	1	0	0	2
8	(Brazil)	3	Felipe Melo	1	0	1	0	2
8	(Turkey)	4	Hamit Altıntop	1	0	1	0	2
9	(Brazil)	13	Alex Telles	1	0	0	0	1
9	(Turkey)	18	Sinan Gümüş	0	0	1	0	1
9	(Switzerland)	6	Blerim Džemaili	0	0	1	0	1
9	(Turkey)	55	Sabri Sarıoğlu	0	0	1	0	1
10			Own Goals	1	0	1	0	2
			TOTALS	60	4	37	0	101

=== Assists ===
Last updated on 3 June 2015

Position	Nation	Number	Name	Total
1	(Turkey)	23	Yasin Öztekin	14
2	(Turkey)	8	Selçuk İnan	10
3	(Netherlands)	10	Wesley Sneijder	7
3	(Turkey)	55	Sabri Sarıoğlu	7
3	(Turkey)	29	Olcan Adın	7
4	(Portugal)	11	Bruma	6
4	(Turkey)	17	Burak Yılmaz	6
5	(Turkey)	52	Emre Çolak	5
6	(Turkey)	9	Umut Bulut	3
7	(Cameroon)	21	Aurélien Chedjou	2
7	(Switzerland)	6	Blerim Džemaili	2
7	(North Macedonia)	19	Goran Pandev	2
7	(Turkey)	88	~~Veysel Sarı~~	2
8	(Brazil)	13	Alex Telles	1
8	(Turkey)	26	Semih Kaya	1
8	(Turkey)	18	Sinan Gümüş	1
8	(Brazil)	3	Felipe Melo	1

=== Disciplinary record ===
N	Pos.	Nat.	Name	Yellow card	Second yellow card	Red card	Notes
1	GK	(Uruguay)	Fernando Muslera	4			
58	GK	(Turkey)	Sinan Bolat	1			
67	GK	(Turkey)	Eray İşcan				
21	DF	(Cameroon)	Aurélien Chedjou	8			
5	DF	(Turkey)	Gökhan Zan				
28	DF	(Turkey)	Koray Günter	1		1	
22	DF	(Turkey)	Hakan Balta	6			
15	DF	(Brazil)	Alex Telles	5			
88	DF	(Turkey)	~~Veysel Sarı~~	2			
77	DF	(Turkey)	Tarık Çamdal	4			
26	DF	(Turkey)	Semih Kaya	5			
40	DF	(Turkey)	~~Emre Can Coşkun~~				
55	DF	(Turkey)	Sabri Sarıoğlu	4			
4	MF	(Turkey)	Hamit Altıntop	4			
8	MF	(Turkey)	Selçuk İnan	8	1		
3	MF	(Brazil)	Felipe Melo	18	1		
7	MF	(Turkey)	Aydın Yılmaz				
90	MF	(Turkey)	~~Umut Gündoğan~~	1			
6	MF	(Switzerland)	Blerim Džemaili	7			
23	MF	(Turkey)	~~Furkan Özçal~~				
10	MF	(Netherlands)	Wesley Sneijder	6			
35	MF	(Turkey)	Yekta Kurtuluş	6			
18	MF	(Turkey)	Sinan Gümüş	2			
52	MF	(Turkey)	Emre Çolak	3			
29	MF	(Turkey)	Olcan Adın	12			
27	MF	(Turkey)	Yasin Öztekin	3			
20	MF	(Portugal)	Bruma	3			
9	FW	(Turkey)	Umut Bulut	3			
17	FW	(Turkey)	Burak Yılmaz	8			
9	FW	(North Macedonia)	Goran Pandev	1			

Last updated: 3 June 2015
Source: http://www.ntvspor.net/istatistik
Only competitive matches
(yellow card) = Number of bookings; (second yellow card) = Number of sending offs after a second yellow card; (red card) = Number of sending offs by a direct red card.

=== Overall ===
	Total	Home	Away	Neutral
Games played	53	26	25	2
Games won	33	18	14	1
Games drawn	7	4	3	0
Games lost	13	4	8	1
Biggest win	9-1 vs FBM Yaşamspor	4-0 vs Manisaspor	9-1 vs FBM Yaşamspor	3-2 vs Bursaspor
Biggest loss	4-0 vs Borussia Dortmund; 4-0 vs İstanbul Başakşehir	4-0 vs Borussia Dortmund	4-0 vs İstanbul Başakşehir	2–3 vs Fenerbahçe
Biggest win (League)	5-0 vs Konyaspor	4-2 vs Karabükspor	5-0 vs Konyaspor	-
Biggest win (Cup)	9-1 vs FBM Yaşamspor	4-0 vs Manisaspor	9-1 vs FBM Yaşamspor	3-2 vs Bursaspor
Biggest win (UEFA)	-	-	-	-
Biggest win (Super Cup)	-	-	-	-
Biggest loss (League)	4-0 vs İstanbul Başakşehir	3-0 vs Trabzonspor	4-0 vs İstanbul Başakşehir	-
Biggest loss (Cup)	2-0 vs Diyarbakır Büyükşehir Belediyespor	2-0 vs Diyarbakır Büyükşehir Belediyespor	1-0 vs Eskişehirspor	-
Biggest loss (UEFA)	4-0 vs Borussia Dortmund	4-0 vs Borussia Dortmund	4-1 vs Arsenal; 4-1 vs Borussia Dortmund	-
Biggest loss (Super Cup)	2–3 vs Fenerbahçe	-	-	2-3 vs Fenerbahçe
Clean sheets	13	7	6	0
Goals scored	101	53	45	3
Goals conceded	69	33	34	2
Goal difference	+32	+20	+11	+1
Average GF per game	1.88	2.04	1.8	1.5
Average GA per game	1.29	1.27	1.36	1
Yellow cards	125	–		
Red cards	3	–		
Most appearances	(Netherlands) Wesley Sneijder (Turkey) Selçuk İnan (44)	–		
Most minutes played	(Turkey) Selçuk İnan (3823)	–		
Most goals	(Turkey) Burak Yılmaz (22)	–		
Most assists	(Turkey) Yasin Öztekin (14)	–		
Points	106	58	45	3
Winning rate	61.54%	69.23%	56%	50%

=== Attendances ===
Competition	Total. Att.	Avg. Att.
Süper Lig	419,090	26,193
Turkish Cup	54,927	9,155
UEFA Champions League	85,467	28,489
Total	559,484	22,379

- Sold season tickets: 31,200

== See also ==
- 2014–15 Süper Lig
- 2014–15 Turkish Cup
- 2014 Turkish Super Cup
- 2014–15 UEFA Champions League
