= 2016–17 Galatasaray S.K. season =

Galatasaray
2016–17 season
- President: Dursun Aydın Özbek
- Head coach: Jan Olde Riekerink (until 14 February 2017); Igor Tudor (from 15 February 2017)
- Stadium: Türk Telekom Arena
- Süper Lig: 4th
- Turkish Cup: Round of 16
- Turkish Super Cup: Winners
- Top goalscorer: League: Bruma (11); All: Lukas Podolski (17)
- Highest home attendance: 43,071 vs Trabzonspor (Süper Lig, 22 October 2016)
- Lowest home attendance: 2,500 vs Tuzlaspor (Turkish Cup, 21 December 2016)
- Average home league attendance: 21,751
Home colours	Away colours	Third colours

The 2016–17 Galatasaray season was the club's 113th season in existence and 59th consecutive season in the Süper Lig. The club were aiming for an unprecedented 21st Turkish title, after finishing the Süper Lig in sixth place in the previous season.

In Europe, Galatasaray was not present in any competition, having been barred from entering in the previous season by UEFA. They did however compete domestically in both the Turkish Cup and the Turkish Super Cup.

This article shows statistics of the club's players in the season, and also lists all matches the club played in during the season. The season covered a period from 1 July 2016 to 30 June 2017.

== Club ==
=== Technical Staff ===
Position	Staff
Manager	(Croatia) Igor Tudor
Assistant Manager	(Croatia) Hari Vukas
Goalkeeper Coach	(Croatia) Sandro Tomić
Conditioner	(Croatia) Toni Modrić
Chief Scout	(Turkey) Emre Utkucan

=== Board of directors ===
Position	Staff
President	(Turkey) Dursun Aydın Özbek
	(Turkey) Cengiz Özyalçın
	(Turkey) Nasuhi Sezgin
	(Turkey) Eşref Alaçayır
	(Turkey) Can Topsakal
	(Turkey) İsmail Sarıkaya
	(Turkey) Ural Aküzüm
	(Turkey) Tarık Taşar
	(Turkey) Levent Nazifoğlu

=== Medical Staff ===
Position	Staff
Doctor	(Turkey) Yener İnce (Turkey) Gürbey Kahveci
Physiotherapist	(Turkey) Mustafa Korkmaz (Turkey) Burak Koca (Turkey) İlhan Er
Masseur	(Turkey) Cenk Akkaya (Turkey) Sedat Peker (Turkey) Mahmut Çalış (Turkey) Batuhan Erkan

=== Grounds ===
Ground (capacity and dimensions)	Türk Telekom Arena (52,652 / 105x68m)
Training ground	Florya Metin Oktay Sports Complex and Training Center

=== Kit ===
Uniform Manufacturer: Nike

Chest Advertising's: Nef

Back Advertising's: Garenta

Arm Advertising's: Permolit

Short Advertising's: Coca-Cola

Home
Away
Third

== Sponsorship ==
Companies that Galatasaray had sponsorship deals with during the season included the following.

Licensee	Product
Nef	Main Sponsor
Nike	Technical Sponsor
Garenta	Cosponsor
Permolit	Cosponsor

== Season overview ==
- On 27 May 2016, it was announced that midfielder Emre Çolak had been transferred to Deportivo La Coruña.
- On 28 May 2016, Galatasaray revealed its pre-season summer camp schedule. The camp schedule for the Galatasaray professional football team prior to the next football season began on 1 July at their training ground, Florya Metin Oktay Sports Complex and Training Center.
- On 22 June 2016, it was announced that Galatasaray had begun official negotiations regarding the transfer of Serdar Aziz from Bursaspor. The original bid was reported as €4.5 million, with Aziz set to receive an annual salary of €2 million.
- On 27 June 2016, it was announced that the contracts of Bilal Kısa, Furkan Özçal and Sercan Yıldırım had been terminated by Galatasaray.
- On 28 June 2016, it was announced that Emre Can Coşkun had been sold to Göztepe for a transfer fee of €50,000.
- On 29 June 2016, it was announced that José Rodríguez had been sold to Mainz 05 for a €2.145 million transfer fee.
- On 30 June 2016, it was announced that Galatasaray would play a friendly match against Manchester United on 30 July in Gothenburg, Sweden.
- On 30 June 2016, it was announced that Galatasaray had reached a deal with Jan Olde Riekerink for the 2016–17 season.
- On 4 July 2016, it was announced that defender Sabri Sarıoğlu had extended his contract until 2017.
- On 4 July 2016, it was announced that midfielder Hamit Altıntop had extended his contract until 2017.
- On 4 July 2016, it was announced that Galatasaray had begun official negotiations regarding the transfer of Turkish winger Emrah Başsan. Galatasaray did not pay a transfer fee for the footballer, and Başsan was set to earn a salary of €400,000 per year.
- On 8 July 2016, it was announced that striker Volkan Pala had been loaned out on a two-year loan to Çaykur Rizespor.
- On 12 July 2016, it was announced that Alex Telles had been sold to Porto for a €6.5 million transfer fee.
- On 24 July 2016, it was announced that Umut Bulut, Olcan Adın, Endoğan Adili and Tarık Çamdal had not been included in the second camp squad.
- On 1 August 2016, it was announced that Galatasaray had begun official negotiations regarding the transfer of Turkish striker Eren Derdiyok.
- On 1 August 2016, it was announced that the friendly match between Galatasaray and Atlético Madrid has been cancelled on request.
- On 5 August 2016, it was announced that Galatasaray had transferred Eren Derdiyok from Kasımpaşa. The original bid was reported as €4 million, with Derdiyok set to receive an annual salary of €2.15 million.
- On 7 August 2016, it was announced that Galatasaray had begun official negotiations regarding the transfer of Turkish midfielder Tolga Ciğerci.
- On 8 August 2016, it was announced that Galatasaray had transferred in Tolga Ciğerci from Hertha BSC. The original bid was reported as €3 million, with Tolga set to receive an annual salary of €2 million.
- On 8 August 2016, it was announced that Galatasaray had begun official negotiations regarding the transfer of Belgian defender Luis Pedro Cavanda.
- On 8 August 2016, it was announced that Galatasaray had transferred in Luis Pedro Cavanda from Trabzonspor. The original bid was reported as €1.8 million, with Cavanda set to receive an annual salary of €875,000.
- On 9 August 2016, a jersey sponsorship agreement was made between Galatasaray and Nef.
- On 17 August 2016, it was announced that Blerim Džemaili had been sold to Bologna for €1.3 million.
- On 23 August 2016, it was announced that Galatasaray had begun official negotiations regarding the loan of Portuguese midfielder Josué. Josué was set to receive an annual salary of €700,000.
- On 29 August 2016, it was announced that the contract of Olcan Adın had been terminated by Galatasaray.
- On 30 August 2016, it was announced that Galatasaray had begun official negotiations regarding the loan of Icelandic midfielder Kolbeinn Sigþórsson for €700,000. Sigþórsson was set receive an annual salary of €1.2 million. Galatasaray also had a buy-out option for €3.8 million.
- On 31 August 2016, it was announced that Galatasaray had begun official negotiations regarding the transfer of midfielder Nigel de Jong. De Jong was set to receive an annual salary of €2.5 million.
- On 31 August 2016, it was announced that the contract of Umut Bulut had been terminated by Galatasaray.
- On 31 August 2016, it was announced that Tarık Çamdal had been loaned out to Eskişehirspor for the rest of the season.
- On 31 August 2016, it was announced that Ryan Donk had been loaned out to Real Betis for the rest of the season.
- On 9 August 2016, a jersey sponsorship agreement was made between Galatasaray and Permolit.
- On 29 December 2016, it was announced that the contract of Kolbeinn Sigþórsson had been terminated by Galatasaray.
- On 3 January 2017, it was announced that Salih Dursun had been loaned out to Antalyaspor for the rest of the season.
- On 4 January 2017, it was announced that the contract of Hamit Altıntop had been terminated by Galatasaray.
- On 4 January 2017, it was announced that Emrah Başsan had been loaned out to Fortuna Sittard for the rest of the season.
- On 6 January 2017, it was announced that the contract of Lucas Ontivero had been terminated by Galatasaray.
- On 6 January 2017, it was announced that the contract of Jem Karacan had been terminated by Galatasaray.
- On 10 January 2017, it was announced that Galatasaray had begun official negotiations regarding the transfer of winger Garry Rodrigues. Rodrigues was set to receive an annual salary of €1.35 million.
- On 11 January 2017, it was announced that Umut Gündoğan had been loaned out to Manisaspor until the end of the season.
- On 11 January 2017, it was announced that Galatasaray had begun official negotiations regarding the transfer of Turkish defender Ahmet Yılmaz Çalık for €2.5 million. Ahmet was set to receive an annual salary of €0.9 million.
- On 15 February 2017, it was announced that had Galatasaray dismissed manager Jan Olde Riekerink.
- On 15 February 2017, it was announced that Galatasaray had reached a deal with Igor Tudor as new manager until the 2017–18 season.

== Players ==
=== Squad information ===
N	Pos.	Nat.	Name	Age	EU	Since	App	Goals	Ends	Transfer fee	Notes
1	GK	(Uruguay)	Fernando Muslera	40	EU	2011	228	1	2018	€6.75M + Lorik Cana	
3	DF	(Turkey)	Ahmet Yılmaz Çalık	32	Non-EU	2017	5	0	2021	€2.5M	
4	DF	(Turkey)	Serdar Aziz	35	Non-EU	2016	6	0	2020	€4.5M	
7	MF	(Turkey)	Yasin Öztekin	39	EU	2014	106	25	2018	€2.5M	Second nationality: German
8	MF	(Turkey)	Selçuk İnan (C)	41	Non-EU	2011	236	51	2019	Free	
9	FW	(Switzerland)	Eren Derdiyok	38	EU	2016	25	9	2019	€4M	Second nationality: Turkish
10	MF	(Netherlands)	Wesley Sneijder (VC)	42	EU	2013	163	42	2018	€7.5M	
11	FW	(Germany)	Lukas Podolski	41	EU	2015	61	30	2018	€2.5M	Second nationality: Polish
14	DF	(Norway)	Martin Linnes	34	Non-EU	2016	31	1	2019	€2M	
16	MF	(Cape Verde)	Garry Rodrigues	35	EU	2017	5	1	2020	€3.5M	Second nationality: Dutch
18	MF	(Turkey)	Sinan Gümüş	32	EU	2014	47	14	2018	Free	Second nationality: German
19	GK	(Turkey)	Cenk Gönen	38	Non-EU	2015	12	0	2020	€0.6M	
20	MF	(Portugal)	Bruma	31	EU	2013	73	11	2018	€10M	Second nationality: Guinean
21	DF	(Cameroon)	Aurélien Chedjou	41	EU	2013	114	12	2017	€6.3M	Second nationality: French
22	DF	(Turkey)	Hakan Balta	43	EU	2007	328	13	2018	€1M + Ferhat Öztorun	Second nationality: German
23	DF	(France)	Lionel Carole	35	EU	2015	57	1	2019	€1.5M	Second nationality: Martiniquais
25	FW	(Turkey)	Berk İsmail Ünsal	32	Non-EU	2014	6	0	2017	Youth system	
26	DF	(Turkey)	Semih Kaya	35	Non-EU	2008	190	5	2018	Youth system	
27	MF	(Turkey)	Tolga Ciğerci	34	EU	2016	11	0	2019	€3M	Second nationality: German
28	DF	(Germany)	Koray Günter	32	EU	2014	41	0	2018	€2.5M	Second nationality: Turkey
30	MF	(Portugal)	Josué	35	EU	2016	20	3	2017	Free	On loan from Porto
34	MF	(Netherlands)	Nigel de Jong	41	EU	2016	18	1	2018	Free	Second nationality: Surinamese
39	DF	(Belgium)	Luis Pedro Cavanda	35	EU	2016	11	0	2019	€1.8M	Second nationality: Congolese
55	DF	(Turkey)	Sabri Sarıoğlu	42	Non-EU	2002	370	19	2017	Youth system	
67	GK	(Turkey)	Eray İşcan	35	Non-EU	2011	13	0	2018	Youth system	

- Last updated: 5 February 2017
- Source: Galatasaray.org, Players in / out, Wikipedia players' articles, and footballdatabase.com (for EU passport)
- Ordered by Last season starting 11 and position on pitch (from back right to front left).

=== Transfers ===
==== In ====
No.	Pos.	Nat.	Name	Age	EU	Moving from	Type	Transfer window	Ends	Transfer fee	Source
20	MF	(Portugal)	Bruma	31	EU	Real Sociedad (Spain)	Loan return	Summer	2018	N/A	
13	DF	(Brazil)	Alex Telles	34	EU	Internazionale (Italy)	Loan return	Summer	2018	N/A	
6	MF	(Switzerland)	Blerim Džemaili	40	EU	Genoa (Italy)	Loan return	Summer	2018	N/A	
66	DF	(Turkey)	Salih Dursun	35	Non-EU	Trabzonspor	Loan return	Summer	2018	N/A	
30	MF	(Turkey)	Furkan Özçal	35	EU	Kayserispor	Loan return	Summer	2018	N/A	
6	MF	(Turkey)	Jem Karacan	37	EU	Bursaspor	Loan return	Summer	2018	N/A	
19	FW	(Turkey)	Sercan Yıldırım	36	Non-EU	Bursaspor	Loan return	Summer	2018	N/A	
	MF	(Switzerland)	Endoğan Adili	32	EU	FC Wil (Switzerland)	Loan return	Summer	2018	N/A	
4	DF	(Turkey)	Serdar Aziz	35	Non-EU	Bursaspor	Transfer	Summer	2020	€4.5M	KAP.gov.tr
17	MF	(Turkey)	Emrah Başsan	34	Non-EU	Antalyaspor	Transfer	Summer	2019	Free	KAP.gov.tr
9	FW	(Switzerland)	Eren Derdiyok	38	EU	Kasımpaşa	Transfer	Summer	2019	€4M	KAP.gov.tr
27	MF	(Turkey)	Tolga Ciğerci	34	EU	Hertha BSC (Germany)	Transfer	Summer	2019	€3M	KAP.gov.tr
39	DF	(Belgium)	Luis Pedro Cavanda	35	EU	Trabzonspor	Transfer	Summer	2019	€1.8M	KAP.gov.tr
34	FW	(Netherlands)	Nigel de Jong	41	EU	LA Galaxy (United States)	Transfer	Summer	2018	Free	KAP.gov.tr
30	MF	(Portugal)	Josué	35	EU	Porto (Portugal)	Loan	Summer	2017	Free	KAP.gov.tr
77	FW	(Iceland)	Kolbeinn Sigþórsson	36	EU	Nantes (France)	Loan	Summer	2017	€0.7M	KAP.gov.tr
16	MF	(Netherlands)	Garry Rodrigues	35	EU	PAOK (Greece)	Transfer	Winter	2020	€3.5M	KAP.gov.tr
3	DF	(Turkey)	Ahmet Yılmaz Çalık	32	Non-EU	Gençlerbirliği	Transfer	Winter	2021	€2.5M	KAP.gov.tr

Total spending: ▼€20,000,000

==== Out ====
No.	Pos.	Nat.	Name	Age	EU	Moving to	Type	Transfer window	Transfer fee	Source
64	DF	(Belgium)	Jason Denayer	31	EU	Manchester City (England)	Loan return	Summer	N/A	
52	MF	(Turkey)	Emre Çolak	35	Non-EU	Deportivo La Coruña (Spain)	End of contract	Summer	Free	Deportivo
5	MF	(Turkey)	Bilal Kısa	43	Non-EU	Bursaspor	Contract termination	Summer	Free	KAP.gov.tr
30	MF	(Turkey)	Furkan Özçal	35	EU	Bursaspor	Contract termination	Summer	Free	KAP.gov.tr
19	FW	(Turkey)	Sercan Yıldırım	36	Non-EU	Bursaspor	Contract termination	Summer	Free	KAP.gov.tr
9	FW	(Turkey)	Umut Bulut	43	Non-EU	Kayserispor	Contract termination	Summer	Free	KAP.gov.tr
29	MF	(Turkey)	Olcan Adın	40	Non-EU	Granada (Spain)	Contract termination	Summer	Free	KAP.gov.tr
34	FW	(Turkey)	Volkan Pala	29	Non-EU	Çaykur Rizespor	Loan	Summer	Free	KAP.gov.tr
17	MF	(Turkey)	Emrah Başsan	34	Non-EU	Çaykur Rizespor	Loan	Summer	Free	KAP.gov.tr
	GK	(Turkey)	İsmail Çipe	31	Non-EU	Bugsaşspor	Loan	Summer	Free	KAP.gov.tr
	MF	(Turkey)	Oğuzhan Kayar	31	Non-EU	Aydınspor 1923	Loan	Summer	Free	KAP.gov.tr
77	DF	(Turkey)	Tarık Çamdal	35	EU	Eskişehirspor	Loan	Summer	Free	KAP.gov.tr
6	DF	(Netherlands)	Ryan Donk	40	EU	Real Betis (Spain)	Loan	Summer	Free	KAP.gov.tr
	GK	(Turkey)	Alperen Uysal	32	Non-EU	Çaykur Rizespor	Transfer	Summer	Free	KAP.gov.tr
40	DF	(Turkey)	Emre Can Coşkun	32	Non-EU	Göztepe	Transfer	Summer	€0.05M	KAP.gov.tr
14	MF	(Spain)	José Rodríguez	31	EU	Mainz 05 (Germany)	Transfer	Summer	€2.145M	KAP.gov.tr
13	DF	(Brazil)	Alex Telles	34	EU	Porto (Portugal)	Transfer	Summer	€6.5M	KAP.gov.tr
6	MF	(Switzerland)	Blerim Džemaili	40	EU	Bologna (Italy)	Transfer	Summer	€1.3M	KAP.gov.tr
66	DF	(Turkey)	Salih Dursun	35	Non-EU	Antalyaspor	Loan	Winter	€0.15M	KAP.gov.tr
17	MF	(Turkey)	Emrah Başsan	34	Non-EU	Fortuna Sittard (Netherlands)	Loan	Winter	Free	KAP.gov.tr
90	MF	(Turkey)	Umut Gündoğan	36	EU	Manisaspor	Loan	Winter	Free	KAP.gov.tr
77	FW	(Iceland)	Kolbeinn Sigþórsson	36	EU	Nantes (France)	Contract termination	Winter	Free	KAP.gov.tr
5	MF	(Turkey)	Hamit Altıntop	43	EU	Darmstadt 98 (Germany)	Contract termination	Winter	N/A	KAP.gov.tr
94	MF	(Argentina)	Lucas Ontivero	31	EU		Contract termination	Winter	N/A	KAP.gov.tr
6	MF	(Turkey)	Jem Karacan	37	EU		Contract termination	Winter	N/A	KAP.gov.tr

Total income: ▲€10,150,000

Expenditure: ▼€9,850,000

== Competitions ==
=== Overall ===
Trophy	Started round	First match	Result	Last match
Süper Lig	N/A	19 August 2016	4th	21 May 2017
Turkish Cup	Third round	25 October 2016	Round of 16	4 February 2017
Turkish Super Cup	Final	13 August 2016	Winners	

=== Pre-season, mid-season and friendlies ===
12 July 2016 Friendly	Thun (Switzerland)	1–1	(Turkey) Galatasaray	Thun, Switzerland
17:00 EEST	Hediger 57'	Report	Bruma 25'	Stadium: Stadion Lachen

17 July 2016 2016 Uhrencup	Galatasaray (Turkey)	3–0	(Switzerland) Zürich	Biel/Bienne, Switzerland
17:00 EEST	Bruma 35'; Adili 83'; Ünsal 87'			Stadium: Tissot Arena

19 July 2016 2016 Uhrencup	Young Boys (Switzerland)	1–1	(Turkey) Galatasaray	Biel/Bienne, Switzerland
20:30 EEST	Lecjaks 83'		Bruma 13'	Stadium: Tissot Arena

26 July 2016 Friendly	AGF (Denmark)	1–3	(Turkey) Galatasaray	Aarhus, Denmark
20:45 EEST	Balta 25' (o.g.)		Bruma 38', 53'; Öztekin 89'	Stadium: Ceres Park; Attendance: 4,527

30 July 2016 Friendly	Galatasaray (Turkey)	2–5	(England) Manchester United	Gothenburg, Sweden
20:30 EEST	Gümüş 22'; Bruma 40'		Ibrahimović 4'; Rooney 55', 58' (pen.); Fellani 62'; Mata 74'	Stadium: Ullevi; Attendance: 30,200

3 September 2016 Friendly	Galatasaray (Turkey)	1–0	(Turkey) Boluspor	Istanbul, Turkey
17:30 EEST	Öztekin 31'			Stadium: Florya Metin Oktay Sports Complex and Training Center

8 October 2016 Friendly	Levski Sofia (Bulgaria)	0–2	(Turkey) Galatasaray	Sofia, Bulgaria
19:00 FET		Report	Josué 11'; Altıntop 68'	Stadium: Georgi Asparuhov Stadium

9 January 2017 Friendly	Ettifaq FC (Saudi Arabia)	3–1	(Turkey) Galatasaray	Dammam, Saudi Arabia
19:00 FET	Kanno 20'; Al-Amri 25'; Al-Kwikbi 70'		Bruma 81'	Stadium: Prince Mohamed bin Fahd Stadium

=== Turkish Super Cup ===
13 August 2016 Süper Kupa	Galatasaray	1–1 (a.e.t.) (3–0 p)	Beşiktaş	Konya, Turkey
	Balta 100'	Report	Chedjou 107' (o.g.)	Stadium: Torku Arena; Attendance: 33,700; Referee: Mete Kalkavan; Man of the Match: Fernando Muslera
	Penalties
	İnan (penalty scored); Balta (penalty scored); Ciğerci (penalty scored)		(penalty missed) Özyakup; (penalty missed) Tosun; (penalty missed) Hutchinson

Source: Competitive Matches

=== Süper Lig ===
==== League table ====
Pos	Team	Pld	W	D	L	GF	GA	GD	Pts	Qualification or relegation
2	Başakşehir	34	21	10	3	63	28	+35	73	Qualification for the Champions League third qualifying round
3	Fenerbahçe	34	18	10	6	60	32	+28	64 (Note: Fenerbahçe ahead of Galatasaray on head-to-head points: Fenerbahçe 6 pts, Galatasaray 0 pts.)	Qualification for the Europa League third qualifying round
4	Galatasaray	34	20	4	10	65	40	+25	64	Qualification for the Europa League second qualifying round
5	Antalyaspor	34	17	7	10	47	40	+7	58	
6	Trabzonspor	34	14	9	11	39	34	+5	51	

Source: Süper Lig, Soccerway
Rules for classification: 1) Points; 2) Head-to-head points; 3) Head-to-head goal difference; 4) Head-to-head goals scored; 5) Goal difference; 6) Goals scored; 7) Play-off.

==== Results summary ====
Overall								Home						Away					
Pld	W	D	L	GF	GA	GD	Pts	W	D	L	GF	GA	GD	W	D	L	GF	GA	GD
34	20	4	10	65	40	+25	64	11	0	6	37	17	+20	9	4	4	28	23	+5

Source: Competitive Matches

==== Results by round ====
Round	1	2	3	4	5	6	7	8	9	10	11	12	13	14	15	16	17	18	19	20	21	22	23	24	25	26	27	28	29	30	31	32	33	34
Ground	H	A	A	H	A	H	A	H	A	H	A	H	A	H	A	H	A	A	H	H	A	H	A	H	A	H	A	H	A	H	A	H	A	H
Result	W	W	D	W	D	W	W	L	W	L	L	W	W	W	D	W	W	L	W	L	D	L	W	W	L	W	L	L	W	L	W	W	W	W
Position	6	1	3	3	4	3	3	3	3	3	5	4	3	3	3	3	3	3	3	3	3	3	3	3	3	3	4	4	4	4	4	4	4	4

Source: Competitive Matches
A = Away; H = Home; W = Win; D = Draw; L = Loss

==== Matches ====
22 August 2016 1	Galatasaray	1–0	Karabükspor	Istanbul
21:45 EEST	Derdiyok 90'	Report		Stadium: Türk Telekom Arena; Attendance: 0 Referee: Bülent Yıldırım

27 August 2016 2	Akhisar Belediyespor	1–3	Galatasaray	Manisa
21:45 EEST	Vaz Tê 3'	Report	Derdiok 35'; Öztekin 63'; Bruma 90'	Stadium: Manisa 19 Mayıs Stadium; Attendance: 5,000; Referee: Hüseyin Göçek

10 September 2016 3	Kayserispor	1–1	Galatasaray	Kayseri
18:00 EEST	Welliton 40'	Report	Öztekin 12'	Stadium: Kadir Has Stadium; Attendance: 5,401; Referee: Mete Kalkavan

17 September 2016 4	Galatasaray	2–0	Çaykur Rizespor	Istanbul
20:30 EEST	Derdiyok 6', 89'	Report		Stadium: Türk Telekom Arena; Attendance: 29,528; Referee: Tolga Özkalfa

24 September 2016 5	Beşiktaş	2–2	Galatasaray	Istanbul
20:00 FET	Marcelo 73'; Tosun 78'	Report	Derdiyok 8'; Bruma 44'	Stadium: Vodafone Park; Attendance: 37,396; Referee: Ali Palabıyık

2 October 2016 6	Galatasaray	3–1	Antalyaspor	Istanbul
16:00 FET	İnan 67'; Podolski 78', 85'	Report	Kadah 17'	Stadium: Türk Telekom Arena; Attendance: 40,812; Referee: Özgür Yankaya

15 October 2016 7	Gençlerbirliği	0–1	Galatasaray	Ankara
20:00 FET		Report	Bruma 13'	Stadium: Ankara 19 Mayıs Stadium; Attendance: 8,510; Referee: Cüneyt Çakır

22 October 2016 8	Galatasaray	0–1	Trabzonspor	Istanbul
19:00 FET		Report	N'Doye 17'	Stadium: Türk Telekom Arena; Attendance: 43,071; Referee: Fırat Aydınus

29 October 2016 9	Adanaspor	0–1	Galatasaray	Adana
19:00 FET		Report	Bruma 71'	Stadium: Adana 5 Ocak Stadium; Attendance: 9,600; Referee: Hüseyin Göçek

4 November 2016 10	Galatasaray	1–2	İstanbul Başakşehir	Istanbul
20:00 FET	Gümüş 32'	Report	Batdal 36'; Ayhan 60'	Stadium: Türk Telekom Arena; Attendance: 20,686; Referee: Ali Palabıyık

20 November 2016 11	Fenerbahçe	2–0	Galatasaray	Istanbul
20:00 FET	Van Persie 45', 78' (pen.)	Report		Stadium: Ülker Stadium; Attendance: 44,754; Referee: Cüneyt Çakır

25 November 2016 12	Galatasaray	3–1	Bursaspor	Istanbul
20:00 FET	Öztekin 31'; Sneijder 55'; Derdiyok 90'	Report	Kanatsızkuş 14'	Stadium: Türk Telekom Arena; Attendance: 15,292; Referee: Barış Şimşek

4 December 2016 13	Kasımpaşa	1–2	Galatasaray	Istanbul
19:00 FET	Sneijder 53'	Report	Podolski 6'; Bruma 59'	Stadium: Recep Tayyip Erdoğan Stadium; Attendance: 3,281; Referee: Mete Kalkavan

11 December 2016 14	Galatasaray	3–1	Gaziantepspor	Istanbul
19:00 FET	Öztekin 12', 66', 90'	Report	Süme 74'	Stadium: Türk Telekom Arena; Attendance: 15,202; Referee: Halil Umut Meler

18 December 2016 15	Osmanlıspor	2–2	Galatasaray	Ankara
19:00 FET	Webó 36', 86'	Report	Öztekin 3'; Kaya 87'	Stadium: Osmanlı Stadyumu; Attendance: 6,358; Referee: Hüseyin Göçek

25 December 2016 16	Galatasaray	5–1	Alanyaspor	Istanbul
19:00 FET	De Jong 30'; Gassama 45' (o.g.); Sneijder 51'; Derdiyokl 55'; Josué 80'	Report	Shahbazzadeh 39'	Stadium: Türk Telekom Arena; Attendance: 12,140; Referee: Halis Özkahya

14 January 2017 17	Konyaspor	0–1	Galatasaray	Konya
19:00 FET		Report	Sarıoğlu 51'	Stadium: Torku Arena; Attendance: 22,667; Referee: Mete Kalkavan

21 January 2017 18	Karabükspor	2–1	Galatasaray	Karabük
19:00 FET	Seleznyov 31' (pen.); Deliktaş 82'	Report	Öztekin 15'	Stadium: Dr. Necmettin Şeyhoğlu Stadium; Attendance: 7,553; Referee: Cüneyt Çakır

28 January 2017 19	Galatasaray	6–0	Akhisar Belediyespor	Istanbul
19:00 FET	Kaya 9'; Bruma 25', 41'; Öztekin 33'; İnan 79' (pen.); Gümüş 87'	Report		Stadium: Türk Telekom Arena; Attendance: 11,273; Referee: Ali Palabıyık

12 February 2017 20	Galatasaray	1–2	Kayserispor	Istanbul
19:00 FET	Derdiyok 89'	Report	Mabiala 29'; Gülen 45' (pen.)	Stadium: Türk Telekom Arena; Attendance: 19,946; Referee: Hüseyin Göçek

18 February 2017 21	Çaykur Rizespor	1–1	Galatasaray	Rize
19:00 FET	Çek 75'		Podolski 23'	Stadium: Türk Telekom Arena; Attendance: 4,800; Referee: Halis Özkahya

27 February 2017 22	Galatasaray	0–1	Beşiktaş	Istanbul
20:00 EEST		Report	Talisca 47'	Stadium: Türk Telekom Arena; Attendance: 38,373; Referee: Bülent Yıldırım

6 March 2017 23	Antalyaspor	2–3	Galatasaray	Antalya
20:00 EEST	Etame 44'; Kadah 53'	Report	Bruma 24' (o.g.); Derdiyok 36', 90'	Stadium: New Antalya Stadium; Attendance: 15,350; Referee: Ali Palabıyık

11 March 2017 24	Galatasaray	3–2	Gençlerbirliği	Istanbul
19:00 EEST	İnan 5' (pen.), 90'; Podolski 45'	Report	Khalili 1'; Şahin 69' (pen.)	Stadium: Türk Telekom Arena; Attendance: 11,256; Referee: Fırat Aydınus

18 March 2017 25	Trabzonspor	2–0	Galatasaray	Trabzon
20:00 EEST	N'Doye 23'; Yazıcı 49'	Report		Stadium: Şenol Güneş Stadium; Attendance: 33,801; Referee: Halis Özkahya

3 April 2017 26	Galatasaray	4–0	Adanaspor	Istanbul
20:00 EEST	Podolski 25'; Rodrigues 47'; İnan 55' (pen.), 59' (pen.)	Report		Stadium: Türk Telekom Arena; Attendance: 9,992; Referee: Yaşar Kemal Uğurlu

10 April 2017 27	İstanbul Başakşehir	4–0	Galatasaray	Istanbul
19:00 EEST	Adebayor 11', 44', 57'; Pektemek 86'	Report		Stadium: Başakşehir Arena; Attendance: 7,697; Referee: Cüneyt Çakır

23 April 2016 28	Galatasaray	0–1	Fenerbahçe	Istanbul
19:00 EEST		Report	Souza 90'	Stadium: Türk Telekom Arena; Attendance: 37,639; Referee: Fırat Aydınus

1 May 2017 29	Bursaspor	0–5	Galatasaray	Bursa
20:00 EEST		Report	Bruma 5', 45'; Çalık 57'; Podolski 60'; Öztekin 89'	Stadium: Timsah Arena; Attendance: 13,680; Referee: Halis Özkahya

6 May 2017 30	Galatasaray	1–3	Kasımpaşa	Istanbul
19:00 EEST	Sneijder 90'	Report	Castro 25', 81'; Şahin 63'	Stadium: Türk Telekom Arena; Attendance: 0 Referee: Özgür Yankaya

14 May 2017 31	Gaziantepspor	1–2	Galatasaray	Gaziantep
19:00 EEST	Thiam 53'	Report	Josué 31'; Sneijder 80'	Stadium: New Gaziantep Stadium; Attendance: 4,825; Referee: Hüseyin Göçek

19 May 2017 32	Galatasaray	2–0	Osmanlıspor FK	Istanbul
20:00 EEST	Sneijder 24'; Gümüş 35'	Report		Stadium: Türk Telekom Arena; Attendance: 7,521; Referee: Ali Palabıyık

29 May 2017 33	Alanyaspor	2–3	Galatasaray	Alanya
20:00 EEST	Vágner Love 23', 76'	Report	Bruma 14'; Gümüş 17', 27'	Stadium: Bahçeşehir Okulları Stadium; Attendance: 4,577; Referee: Halil Umut Meler

3 June 2017 34	Galatasaray	2–1	Konyaspor	Istanbul
17:00 EEST	Gümüş 34', 77'	Report	Ay 63'	Stadium: Türk Telekom Arena; Attendance: 7,532; Referee: Halis Özkahya

=== Turkish Cup ===
25 October 2016 Third round	Galatasaray	5–1	Dersimspor	Istanbul
21:00 EEST	Podolski 23', 35', 60'; Öztekin 40'; Altıntop 90'	Report	Kurt 85'	Stadium: Türk Telekom Arena; Referee: Bülent Birincioğlu

Team	Pld	W	D	L	GF	GA	GD	Pts
Tuzlaspor	6	4	1	1	11	5	+6	13
Galatasaray	6	3	2	1	16	9	+7	11
24 Erzincanspor	6	2	1	3	10	14	−4	7
Elazığspor	6	0	2	4	5	14	−9	1

30 November 2016 Group stage	Galatasaray	1–1	Elazığspor	Istanbul
18:30 FET	Carole 41'	Report	Kayalı 90' (pen.)	Stadium: Türk Telekom Arena; Attendance: 2,500; Referee: Arda Kardeşler

14 December 2016 Group stage	Erzincanspor	1–1	Galatasaray	Erzincan
18:30 FET	Serçek 58' (pen.)	Report	Josué 50'	Stadium: Erzincan 13 Şubat Stadium; Attendance: 4,500; Referee: Yaşar Kemal Uğurlu

21 December 2016 Group stage	Galatasaray	2–1	Tuzlaspor	Istanbul
20:30 FET	Sarıoğlu 68'; Josué 90' (pen.)	Report	Papaker 75'	Stadium: Türk Telekom Arena; Attendance: 2,500; Referee: Volkan Bayarslan

28 December 2016 Group stage	Tuzlaspor	3–2	Galatasaray	Istanbul
21:00 FET	Şahin 51'; Fındıkçı 53'; Papaker 58'	Report	Chedjou 45'; Linnes 70'	Stadium: Başakşehir Fatih Terim Stadium; Attendance: 1,400; Referee: Alper Ulusoy

17 January 2017 Group stage	Elazığspor	1–4	Galatasaray	Elazığ
19:45 FET	Özgöz 84' (pen.)	Report	Podolski 9', 90'; Kalkan 59' (o.g.); Derdiyok 74'	Stadium: Elazığ Atatürk Stadium; Attendance: 5,000; Referee: Kutluhan Bilgiç

24 January 2017 Group stage	Galatasaray	6–2	Erzincanspor	Istanbul
18:30 FET	Podolski 4', 10', 50', 55', 63'; Rodrigues 27'	Report	Dülger 15'; Ergün 25'	Stadium: Türk Telekom Arena; Attendance: 6,604; Referee: Serkan Tokat

4 February 2017 Round of 16	İstanbul Başakşehir	2–1	Galatasaray	Istanbul
20:30 FET	Pektemek 15', 27'	Report	Derdiyok 90'	Stadium: Başakşehir Fatih Terim Stadium; Attendance: 7,500; Referee: Mete Kalkavan

== Statistics ==
=== Squad statistics ===
As of 3 June 2017

No.	Pos.	Name	League		Turkish Cup		Super Cup		Total		Discipline		Minutes
No.	Pos.	Name	Apps	Goals	Apps	Goals	Apps	Goals	Apps	Goals	Yellow card	Red card	Total
1	GK	(Uruguay) Fernando Muslera	34	0	0	0	1	0	35	0	2	0	3180
19	GK	(Turkey) Cenk Gönen	0	0	8	0	0	0	8	0	0	0	720
67	GK	(Turkey) Eray İşcan	0	0	0	0	0	0	0	0	0	0	0
23	DF	(France) Lionel Carole	25	0	5	1	1	0	30	1	4	0	2649
39	DF	(Belgium) Luis Pedro Cavanda	7	0	6	0	0	0	13	0	4	0	713
4	DF	(Turkey) Serdar Aziz	5	0	1	0	0	0	6	0	5	0	447
21	DF	(Cameroon) Aurélien Chedjou	15	0	4	1	1	0	20	1	1	1	1708
22	DF	(Turkey) Hakan Balta	22	0	0	0	1	1	23	1	3	1	2025
28	DF	(Germany) Koray Günter	0	0	0	0	0	0	0	0	0	0	0
3	DF	(Turkey) Ahmet Yılmaz Çalık	14	1	3	0	0	0	17	1	1	0	1370
24	DF	(Turkey) ~~Salih Dursun~~	0	0	1	0	0	0	1	0	0	0	16
26	DF	(Turkey) Semih Kaya	20	2	7	0	0	0	27	2	1	0	2284
14	DF	(Norway) Martin Linnes	18	0	7	1	1	0	26	1	2	0	1798
55	DF	(Turkey) Sabri Sarıoğlu	28	1	6	1	0	0	34	2	3	0	2753
5	MF	(Turkey) ~~Hamit Altıntop~~	4	0	5	1	0	0	9	1	0	0	454
34	MF	(Netherlands) Nigel de Jong	18	1	6	0	0	0	24	1	6	1	1626
27	MF	(Germany) Tolga Ciğerci	24	0	0	0	1	0	25	0	9	1	1926
8	MF	(Turkey) Selçuk İnan	32	6	3	0	1	0	36	6	3	0	2940
7	MF	(Turkey) Yasin Öztekin	28	10	7	1	1	0	36	10	3	1	2533
18	MF	(Turkey) Sinan Gümüş	18	7	2	0	1	0	21	7	1	0	929
16	MF	(Netherlands) Garry Rodrigues	16	1	2	1	0	0	18	2	1	0	847
20	MF	(Portugal) Bruma	30	11	6	0	1	0	37	11	7	1	3119
30	MF	(Portugal) Josué	25	2	8	2	0	0	33	4	6	0	1799
10	MF	(Netherlands) Wesley Sneijder	28	5	4	0	1	0	33	3	6	0	2367
9	FW	(Switzerland) Eren Derdiyok	31	10	6	2	1	0	38	12	3	0	2059
11	FW	(Germany) Lukas Podolski	26	7	5	10	1	0	32	17	9	0	2228
77	FW	(Iceland) ~~Kolbeinn Sigþórsson~~	0	0	0	0	0	0	0	0	0	0	0
–	–	Own goals	–	1	–	1	–	0	–	0	–	-	–

=== Goals ===
Includes all competitive matches. In the case of a tie in total number of goals, players with more goals in Süper Lig are ranked higher, followed by Super Cup and Turkish Cup goals respectively. If all stats are the same, then the younger player is ranked higher.

As of 3 June 2017

Position	Nation	Number	Name	Süper Lig	Turkish Cup	Süper Kupa	Total
1	(Germany)	11	Lukas Podolski	7	10	0	17
2	(Switzerland)	9	Eren Derdiyok	10	2	0	12
3	(Turkey)	7	Yasin Öztekin	10	1	0	11
4	(Portugal)	20	Bruma	11	0	0	11
5	(Turkey)	18	Sinan Gümüş	7	0	0	7
6	(Turkey)	8	Selçuk İnan	6	0	0	6
7	(Netherlands)	10	Wesley Sneijder	5	0	0	5
8	(Portugal)	30	Josué Pesqueira	1	2	0	3
7	(Turkey)	26	Semih Kaya	2	0	0	2
7	(Turkey)	55	Sabri Sarıoğlu	1	1	0	2
7	(Cape Verde)	16	Garry Rodrigues	1	1	0	2
8	(Netherlands)	34	Nigel de Jong	1	0	0	1
8	(France)	23	Lionel Carole	0	1	0	1
8	(Turkey)	5	~~Hamit Altıntop~~	0	1	0	1
8	(Norway)	14	Martin Linnes	0	1	0	1
8	(Cameroon)	21	Aurélien Chedjou	0	1	0	1
8	(Turkey)	22	Hakan Balta	0	0	1	1
8	(Turkey)	3	Ahmet Yılmaz Çalık	1	0	0	1
8	-	-	Own Goals	1	1	0	3
8			TOTAL	65	22	1	88

=== Disciplinary record ===
N	Pos.	Nat.	Name	Yellow card	Second yellow card	Red card	Notes
1	GK	(Uruguay)	Fernando Muslera	2			
19	GK	(Turkey)	Cenk Gönen				
67	GK	(Turkey)	Eray İşcan				
26	DF	(Turkey)	Semih Kaya	1			
4	DF	(Turkey)	Serdar Aziz	5			
21	DF	(Cameroon)	Aurélien Chedjou	1		1	
28	DF	(Germany)	Koray Günter				
3	DF	(Turkey)	Ahmet Yılmaz Çalık	2			
22	DF	(Turkey)	Hakan Balta	3	1		
27	DF	(Norway)	Martin Linnes	3			
23	DF	(France)	Lionel Carole	4			
39	DF	(Belgium)	Luis Pedro Cavanda	4			
56	DF	(Turkey)	Sabri Sarıoğlu	3			
34	MF	(Netherlands)	Nigel de Jong	6	1		
27	MF	(Germany)	Tolga Ciğerci	9	1		
8	MF	(Turkey)	Selçuk İnan	3			
10	MF	(Netherlands)	Wesley Sneijder	6			
18	MF	(Turkey)	Sinan Gümüş	1			
16	MF	(Netherlands)	Garry Rodrigues	1			
30	MF	(Portugal)	Josué	6			
20	MF	(Portugal)	Bruma	7	1		
7	MF	(Turkey)	Yasin Öztekin	3	1		
9	FW	(Switzerland)	Eren Derdiyok	3			
11	FW	(Germany)	Lukas Podolski	9			

Last updated: 3 June 2017
Source: http://www.ntvspor.net/istatistik
Only competitive matches
(yellow card) = Number of bookings; (second yellow card) = Number of sending offs after a second yellow card; (red card) = Number of sending offs by a direct red card.

=== Overall ===
	Total	Home	Away	Neutral
Games played	43	21	21	1
Games won	24	14	10	-
Games drawn	7	1	5	1
Games lost	12	6	6	-
Biggest win	6–0 vs Akhisar Belediyespor	6–0 vs Akhisar Belediyespor	0–5 vs Bursaspor	-
Biggest loss	0–4 vs Başakşehir	1–2 vs Başakşehir & Kayserispor	0–4 vs Başakşehir	-
Biggest win (League)	6–0 vs Akhisar Belediyespor	6–0 vs Akhisar Belediyespor	0–5 vs Bursaspor	-
Biggest win (Cup)	6–2 vs Erzincanspor	6–2 vs Erzincanspor	4–1 vs Elazığspor	-
Biggest win (Super Cup)	–			
Biggest loss (League)	0–4 vs Başakşehir	1–2 vs Başakşehir & Kayserispor	0–4 vs Başakşehir	-
Biggest loss (Cup)	2–3 vs Tuzlaspor	-	2–3 vs Tuzlaspor	-
Biggest loss (Super Cup)	–			
Clean sheets	9	5	4	-
Goals scored	88	51	36	1
Goals conceded	53	22	30	1
Goal difference	+35	+29	+6	0
Average GF per game	2.05	2.43	1.71	1
Average GA per game	1.23	1.05	1.43	1
Yellow cards	82	–		
Red cards	6	–		
Most appearances	Eren Derdiyok (38)	–		
Most minutes played	Fernando Muslera (3180)	–		
Most goals	Lukas Podolski (17)	–		
Most assists	Wesley Sneijder (17)	–		
Points	79	43	35	1
Winning rate	55.81%	66.67%	47.62%	0%

=== Attendances ===
Competition	Total. Att.	Avg. Att.
Süper Lig	326,267	21,757
Türkiye Kupası	26,604	6,651
Total	352,871	18,572

- Sold season tickets: 20,000 & 197 suites = 22,167

== See also ==
- 2016–17 Süper Lig
- 2016–17 Turkish Cup
- 2016 Turkish Super Cup
