= 2014 Turkish Super Cup =

- Event: Turkish Super Cup
Fenerbahçe	Galatasaray
0	0
- after extra time Fenerbahçe won 3–2 on penalties
- Date: 25 August 2014
- Venue: Manisa 19 Mayıs Stadium, Manisa
- Referee: Mustafa Kâmil Abitoğlu

2014 Turkish Super Cup (Turkish: TFF Süper Kupa) was the 41st edition of the Turkish Super Cup since its establishment as Presidential Cup in 1966. The match was contested between the 2013–14 Süper Lig champions Fenerbahçe and the 2013–14 Turkish Cup winners Galatasaray, making the game the 378th edition of Kıtalar Arası Derbi. The game was a rematch of the 2013 Turkish Super Cup, which was won by title holders Galatasaray.

== Background ==
The fixture was the sixth overall national super cup matchup between the teams since 1966, and the third matchup since 2006 and 2013. Galatasaray last won the cup in 2013 against Fenerbahçe, while Fenerbahçe last won the cup in 2009 against Beşiktaş. In their previous finals, Galatasaray won in 1996, 2012 and 2013 editions, while Fenerbahçe in 1973 and 1985.

== Path to the final ==
Fenerbahçe were champions in the regular season, finishing nine points ahead of Galatasaray. In the regular season, Fenerbahçe collected 74 points by 23 wins, 5 draws and 6 losses. They were trailed by Galatasaray, who collected 65 points by 18 wins, 11 draws and 5 losses.

Although runners-up of the league, Galatasaray performed better in the domestic cup. They entered the tournament at the fourth round. They won their fourth round match against Gaziantep Büyükşehir Belediyespor. In the fifth round, they beat Balıkesirspor. In the group stage, they were drawn against Antalyaspor, Elazığspor, and Tokatspor but were second position in the group. The semi-finals were the toughest home and away matches for Galatasaray, as they struggled against Bursaspor but were winners. In the 2014 Turkish Cup Final they were crowned champions against rivals Eskişehirspor by a decisive 1–0 win. This was a 15th win for Galatasaray since 1962, its first edition.

== Match ==
=== Details ===
25 August 2014
20:30 EEST (UTC+03)

Fenerbahçe	0–0 (a.e.t.)	Galatasaray
	Report
Penalties
Kuyt (penalty scored); Erkin (penalty missed); Topuz (penalty missed); Meireles (penalty scored); Kadlec (penalty scored)	3–2	(penalty scored) Adın; (penalty missed) İnan; (penalty missed) Melo; (penalty missed) Kurtuluş; (penalty scored) Yılmaz

Manisa 19 Mayıs Stadium, Manisa
Attendance: 16,597
Referee: Mustafa Kâmil Abitoğlu

Fenerbahçe	Galatasaray

GK	1	(Turkey) Volkan Demirel	(yellow card) 120'
RB	77	(Turkey) Gökhan Gönül
CB	22	(Portugal) Bruno Alves	(yellow card) 35'	(substituted off) 82'
CB	4	(Turkey) Bekir İrtegün
LB	88	(Turkey) Caner Erkin
CM	5	(Turkey) Mehmet Topal
CM	14	(Portugal) Raul Meireles
CM	20	(Turkey) Emre Belözoğlu (c)	(yellow card) 31'	(substituted off) 88'
RW	11	(Netherlands) Dirk Kuyt	(yellow card) 90'
LW	7	(Senegal) Moussa Sow		(substituted off) 116'
CF	29	(Nigeria) Emmanuel Emenike	(yellow card) 58'
Substitutes:
GK	23	(Turkey) Mert Günok
DF	3	(Turkey) Hasan Ali Kaldırım
DF	24	(Czech Republic) Michal Kadlec		(substituted on) 82'
MF	21	(Turkey) Selçuk Şahin
MF	26	(Turkey) Alper Potuk		(substituted on) 88'
MF	38	(Turkey) Mehmet Topuz		(substituted on) 116'
FW	9	(Cameroon) Pierre Webó
Manager:
(Turkey) İsmail Kartal

GK	1	(Uruguay) Fernando Muslera
RB	88	(Turkey) Veysel Sarı	(yellow card) 58'
CB	21	(Cameroon) Aurélien Chedjou
CB	26	(Turkey) Semih Kaya
LB	13	(Brazil) Alex Telles	(yellow card) 92'	(substituted off) 104'
CM	3	(Brazil) Felipe Melo	(yellow card) 120'
CM	8	(Turkey) Selçuk İnan (c)	(yellow card) 29'
RW	29	(Turkey) Olcan Adın
AM	10	(Netherlands) Wesley Sneijder		(substituted off) 60'
LW	23	(Turkey) Yasin Öztekin		(substituted off) 60'
CF	17	(Turkey) Burak Yılmaz	(yellow card) 68'
Substitutes:
GK	38	(Turkey) Sinan Bolat
DF	22	(Turkey) Hakan Balta		(substituted on) 104'
MF	20	(Turkey) Furkan Özçal
MF	35	(Turkey) Yekta Kurtuluş		(substituted on) 60'
MF	53	(Morocco) Nordin Amrabat
MF	11	(Portugal) Bruma		(substituted on) 60'
FW	9	(Turkey) Umut Bulut
Manager:
(Italy) Cesare Prandelli

== See also ==
- 2013–14 Süper Lig
- 2013–14 Turkish Cup
