= Göcek =

Göcek may refer to the following places:

- Göcek, Fethiye, a small town in the district of Fethiye, Muğla Province, Turkey
- Göcek, Akhisar, a village in the district of Akhisar, Manisa Province, Turkey
- Köcəkli, a village and municipality of Masally Rayon, Azerbaijan

== See also ==
- Göçek, a surname
