= Kocakli =

Kocakli may refer to:

- Köcəkli, Azerbaijan
- Kozaklı, Turkey
