= Göçek =

Göçek is a Turkish surname. Notable people with the surname include:

- Fatma Müge Göçek (born 1950), Turkish sociologist and professor
- Hüseyin Göçek (born 1976), Turkish football referee
