= Eray İşcan =

Former Turkish footballer (born 1991)

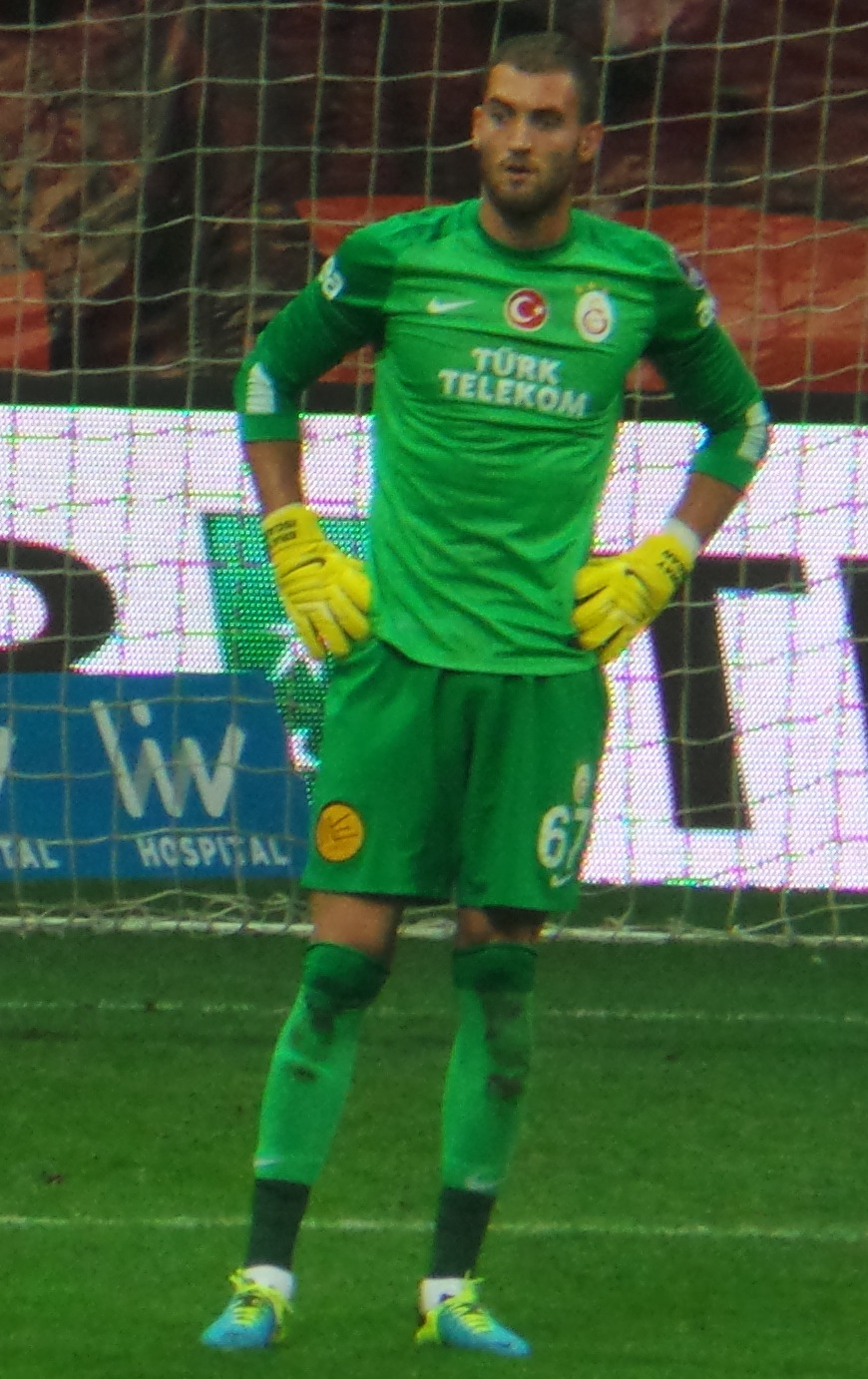

Personal information
- Date of birth: 19 July 1991 (age 35)
- Place of birth: Zonguldak, Turkey
- Height: 1.95 m (6 ft 5 in)
- Position: Goalkeeper

Team information
- Current team: Galatasaray (goalkeeping coach)

Youth career
- 2005–2008: Kilimli Belediyespor
- 2008–2009: Beylerbeyispor
- 2009–2012: Galatasaray

Senior career*
Years	Team	Apps	(Gls)
2012–2018	Galatasaray	5	(0)
2019–2020	Kayserispor	0	(0)
2020–2021	Yeni Malatyaspor	0	(0)
2021–2022	Ankara Keçiörengücü	6	(0)

International career^{‡}
2009	Turkey U18	3	(0)
2009–2010	Turkey U19	3	(0)

Managerial career
- 2026–: Galatasaray (goalkeeping coach)
- * Club domestic league appearances and goals as of 5 February 2022 ‡ National team caps and goals as of 29 July 2012

Eray İşcan (born 19 July 1991) is a former Turkish professional footballer who played as a goalkeeper.

== Club career ==
İşcan made his debut in 2013. He was also at the starting lineup list at 2013–14 UEFA Champions League group stage matches against Copenhagen and Real Madrid.

== Career statistics ==
As of 16 July 2014.

=== Club ===
Club	Season	League		Cup		Super Cup		Europe		Total	
Club	Season	Apps	Goals	Apps	Goals	Apps	Goals	Apps	Goals	Apps	Goals
Galatasaray	2012–13	1	0	1	0	0	0	0	0	2	0
Galatasaray	2013–14	4	0	1	0	0	0	2	0	7	0
Galatasaray	2014–15	0	0	2	0	0	0	0	0	2	0
Galatasaray	Total	5	0	4	0	0	0	2	0	11	0
Career total		5	0	4	0	0	0	2	0	11	0

== Honours ==
Galatasaray

- Süper Lig: 2012–13, 2014–15, 2017–18
- Türkiye Kupası: 2013–14, 2014–15, 2015–16
- Süper Kupa: 2013, 2015, 2016
