= Balçova Yaşamspor =

Turkish football club

FBM Balçova Yaşamspor
- Full name: Fabrika Bakım Montaj Balçova Yaşamspor
- Founded: 2014
- Ground: Kemalpaşa Ulucak Stadium, İzmir
- Capacity: 1,000
- Chairman: Fatih Komili
- Manager: Erhan Erişgin
- League: Turkish Regional Amateur League

Balçova Yaşamspor, or for sponsorship reasons Fabrika Bakım Montaj Balçova Yaşamspor, is a football club located in İzmir, Turkey. The team competes in Turkish Regional Amateur League. The club was promoted to the TFF Third League after the 2012–13 season.

== Previous names ==
- Fahrettin Altay Spor Kulübü (1991–2012)
- Balçova Belediyespor (2012–2014)
- FBM Balçova Yaşamspor (2014–Present)

== League participations ==
- TFF Third League: 2013–2015
- Turkish Regional Amateur League: 2012–2013, 2015–present

== Stadium ==
Currently the team plays at Kemalpaşa Ulucak Stadium.
