= Hakan Turan =

Turkish footballer

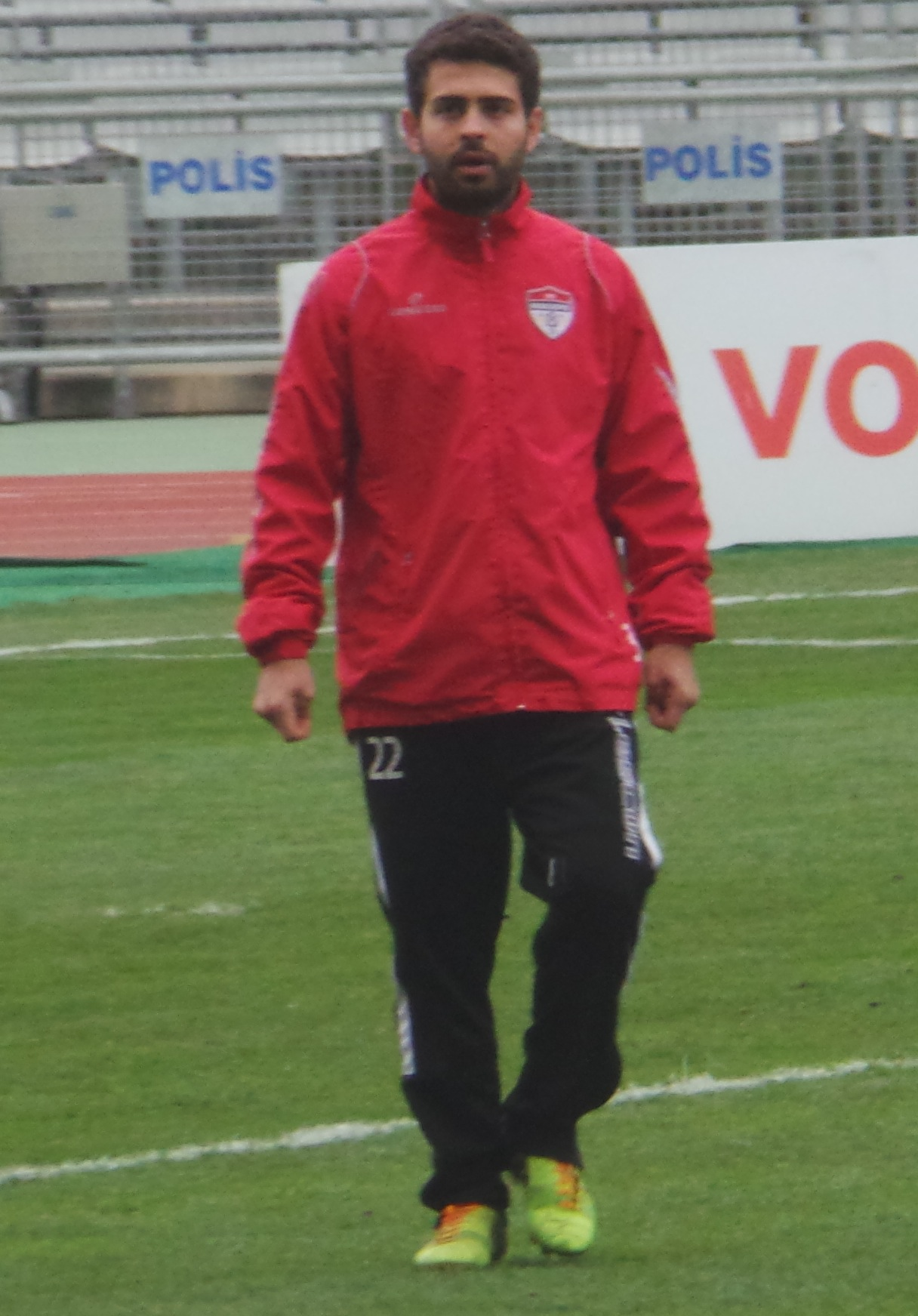

Personal information
- Date of birth: 30 August 1992 (age 34)
- Place of birth: Manisa, Turkey
- Height: 1.73 m (5 ft 8 in)
- Position: Midfielder

Youth career
- 2003–2011: Manisaspor

Senior career*
| Years | Team | Apps | (Gls) |
| 2011–2017 | Manisaspor | 100 | (1) |
| 2017–2018 | Nazilli Belediyespor | 27 | (1) |
| 2018–2021 | Ankara Demirspor | 86 | (2) |
| 2021–2022 | Turgutluspor | 36 | (0) |
| 2022–2023 | Arnavutköy Belediyespor | 22 | (1) |
- * Club domestic league appearances and goals as of 20 May 2023

Hakan Turan (born 30 August 1992) is a Turkish footballer who plays as a midfielder. He made his Süper Lig debut on 31 March 2012 against Gençlerbirliği.
