= Volkan Pala =

Turkish professional footballer (born 1997)

Personal information
- Date of birth: 24 February 1997 (age 29)
- Place of birth: Bakırköy, Turkey
- Height: 1.86 m (6 ft 1 in)
- Position: Striker

Team information
- Current team: Balıkesirspor

Youth career
- 2007–2016: Galatasaray

Senior career*
Years	Team	Apps	(Gls)
2016–2018	Galatasaray	3	(0)
2016	→ Çaykur Rizespor (loan)	0	(0)
2017	→ İnegölspor (loan)	8	(1)
2017	→ Van BB (loan)	4	(0)
2018	→ Ankara Adliyespor (loan)	3	(0)
2019–2020	Artvin Hopaspor	28	(3)
2020–2021	Sarıyer	2	(0)
2021–2022	Kahta 02 SK	9	(0)
2022–2023	Bayburt Özel İdarespor	9	(0)
2023–	Balıkesirspor	0	(0)

International career
2012–2013	Turkey U16	14	(3)
2013	Turkey U17	5	(2)
2014	Turkey U18	2	(0)
- * Club domestic league appearances and goals as of 11 May 2023

Volkan Pala (born 24 February 1997) is a Turkish professional footballer who plays as a striker for Balıkesirspor. He made his professional debut for Galatasaray in a 4–3 loss to Eskişehirspor 2 April 2016.
