= Tarık Çamdal =

Turkish footballer

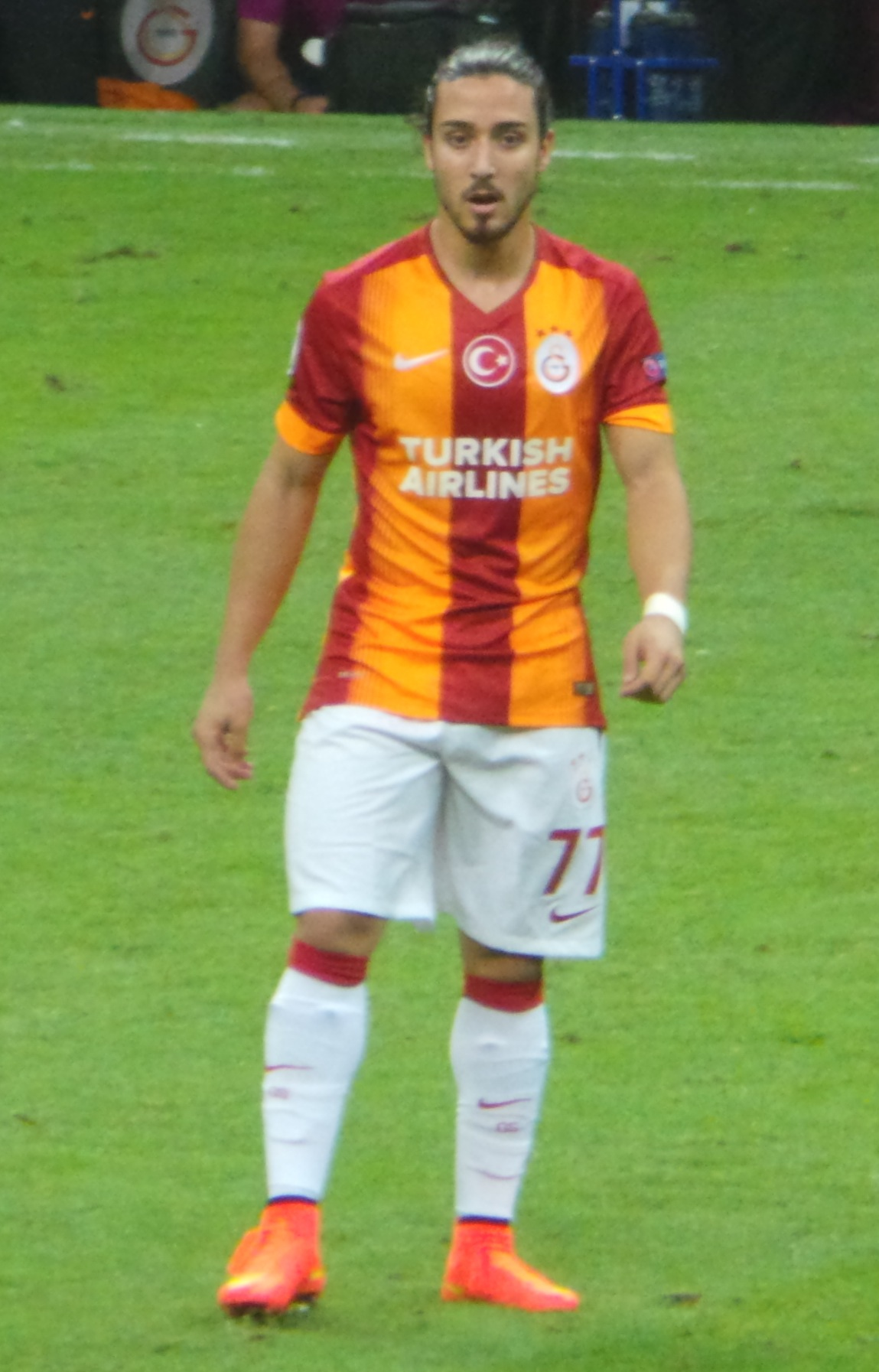
- Çamdal in 2014

Personal information
- Full name: Osman Tarık Çamdal
- Date of birth: 24 March 1991 (age 35)
- Place of birth: Munich, Germany
- Height: 1.76 m (5 ft 9 in)
- Position: Full-back

Youth career
- SV Türk Ingolstadt
- MTV Ingolstadt
- 2003–2009: 1860 Munich

Senior career*
Years	Team	Apps	(Gls)
2009–2011	1860 Munich II	43	(2)
2009–2011	1860 Munich	13	(0)
2011–2014	Eskişehirspor	35	(0)
2014–2019	Galatasaray	21	(0)
2016–2017	→ Eskişehirspor (loan)	28	(0)
2019	Antalyaspor	6	(0)
2020–2022	Adana Demirspor	12	(0)
2022	Tuzlaspor	2	(0)
2022–2023	Göztepe	27	(0)
2023–2024	Sarıyer	26	(0)

International career^{‡}
2009–2010	Germany U19	9	(0)
2013–2014	Turkey A2	4	(0)
2013–	Turkey	6	(1)
- * Club domestic league appearances and goals as of 23 September 2023 ‡ National team caps and goals as of 16 June 2015

Osman Tarık Çamdal (born 24 March 1991) is a Turkish professional footballer who plays as a full-back.

== International career ==
Çamdal made his debut for Turkey against the Republic of Ireland at the Aviva Stadium in Dublin. He scored the winning goal in a 2–1 victory; Turkey's first victory over Ireland on Irish soil.

== Personal life ==
He married Swedish national midfielder Erkan Zengin's sister on 30 December 2015 in Södertälje, Sweden.
