= Köcəkli =

- Municipality
- Location within Azerbaijan
- Coordinates: 39°07′20″N 48°45′22″E
- Country: Azerbaijan
- Rayon: Masally

Population
  - Total: 1,528
- Time zone: UTC+4 (AZT)
  - Summer (DST): UTC+5 (AZT)

Köcəkli (also, Göcəkli, Gochakli, Kechagly, and Kechakli) is a village and municipality in the Masally Rayon of Azerbaijan. It has a population of 1,528.
