= Olcan Adın =

Turkish footballer (born 1985)

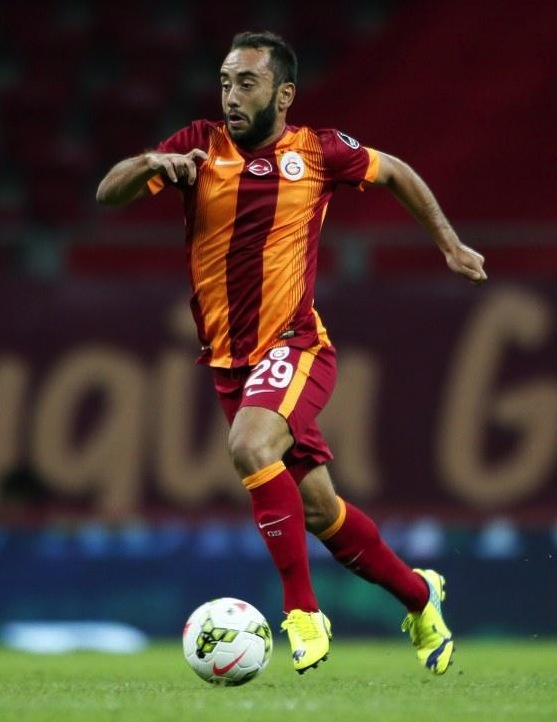

Personal information
- Date of birth: 30 September 1985 (age 41)
- Place of birth: Balıkesir, Turkey
- Height: 1.76 m (5 ft 9 1/2 in)
- Positions: Left back; winger

Youth career
- 2000–2002: Balıkesirspor

Senior career*
Years	Team	Apps	(Gls)
2002–2003	Kartalspor	14	(2)
2003–2008	Fenerbahçe	10	(0)
2004–2005	→ Antalyaspor (loan)	26	(0)
2007–2008	→ Karşıyaka (loan)	32	(8)
2008–2012	Gaziantepspor	89	(18)
2012–2014	Trabzonspor	82	(22)
2014–2016	Galatasaray	55	(4)
2017–2018	Akhisarspor	40	(7)
2018	Antalyaspor	0	(0)

International career^{‡}
2002	Turkey U18	2	(0)
2002–2004	Turkey U19	28	(6)
2004–2005	Turkey U20	11	(1)
2005–2006	Turkey U21	9	(0)
2012–2014	Turkey	10	(1)
- * Club domestic league appearances and goals as of 11 September 2018 ‡ National team caps and goals as of 10 May 2018

Olcan Adın (Turkish pronunciation: [oɫˈdʒɑn ˈɑdɯn], born 30 September 1985) is a retired Turkish professional footballer who played as a left back or winger.

== Club career ==
Olcan started his career for Fenerbahçe, where he played 18 times and scored three goals for the youth team, before transferring to Gaziantepspor in the 2008–09 season for three years and later to Trabzonspor in 2012.

On 28 November 2013, Olcan was the hat-trick hero of the UEFA Europa League match against Apollon Limassol. His three goals and assist helped Trabzonspor to win over Cypriot side and qualify for the knockout stage of the UEFA Europa League.

=== Galatasaray ===
On 5 July 2014, Olcan signed a four-year contract with Galatasaray, for an €4M fee. He scored his first goal in the first game of the season against Bursaspor in a 2-0 away win. He became a left-back in Galatasaray, especially after Lionel Carole's injury and Alex Telles' loaning to Internazionale. On 25 October 2015, Olcan scored a head goal against Fenerbahçe in Süper Lig, also in a rivalry match, which ended 1–1 draw.

=== Akhisarspor ===
On 8 December 2016, Olcan Adın joined Akhisarspor on a 1.5 year contract. In his first season with the club, Olcan scored 5 goals and got 8 assists in 16 league appearances.

He scored against his former club Galatasaray at the Türk Telekom Stadium on 9 December 2017, with a long-range strike from 35 metres. Adın started the match, and played 90 minutes in a match Akhisarspor went on to lose 2–4, after leading 2–0 at half-time. On 10 May 2018, Olcan helped Akhisarspor win their first professional trophy, the 2017–18 Turkish Cup.

== International career ==
On 1 March 2012, Olcan played his first international match for Turkey, against Slovakia. In a friendly match against Sweden on 5 March 2014, he scored the deciding goal coming on as a substitute in a 2-1 win.

== Career statistics ==
As of 11 September 2018.

=== Club ===
Club	Season	League		Cup		Other		Europe		Total	
Club	Season	Apps	Goals	Apps	Goals	Apps	Goals	Apps	Goals	Apps	Goals
Gaziantepspor	2008–09	12	0	3	2	—		—		15	2
Gaziantepspor	2019–10	30	2	1	1	—		—		31	3
Gaziantepspor	2010–11	33	12	8	2	—		—		41	14
Gaziantepspor	2011–12	14	4	0	0	—		4	1	18	5
Gaziantepspor	Total	89	18	12	5	—		4	1	105	24
Trabzonspor	2011–12	19	5	2	0	—		2	1	23	6
Trabzonspor	2012–13	30	7	11	2	—		1	0	42	9
Trabzonspor	2013–14	33	10	1	0	—		14	5	48	15
Trabzonspor	Total	82	22	14	2	—		17	6	113	30
Galatasaray	2014–15	28	1	11	4	1	0	1	0	41	5
Galatasaray	2015–16	27	3	10	1	0	0	6	0	43	4
Galatasaray	Total	55	4	21	5	1	0	7	0	84	9
Akhisarspor	2016–17	16	5	2	0	—		—		18	5
Akhisarspor	2017–18	24	2	5	1	—		—		29	3
Akhisarspor	Total	40	7	7	1	—		—		47	8
Antalyaspor	2018–19	0	0	0	0	—		—		0	0
Antalyaspor	Total	0	0	0	0	—		—		0	0
Career total		266	51	54	13	1	0	28	7	349	71

=== International goals ===
Scores and results table. Turkey's goal tally first:

#	Date	Venue	Opponent	Score	Result	Competition
1.	5 March 2014	Ankara 19 Mayıs Stadium, Ankara, Turkey	Sweden	2–1	2–1	Friendly
As of 5 March 2014.

== Honours ==
Fenerbahçe

- Süper Lig: 2003–04, 2006–07

Galatasaray S.K.

- Süper Lig: 2014–15
- Türkiye Kupası: 2014–15, 2015–16
- Süper Kupa: 2015

Akhisarspor

- Turkish Cup: 2017–18
