= Yekta Kurtuluş =

Turkish footballer (born 1985)

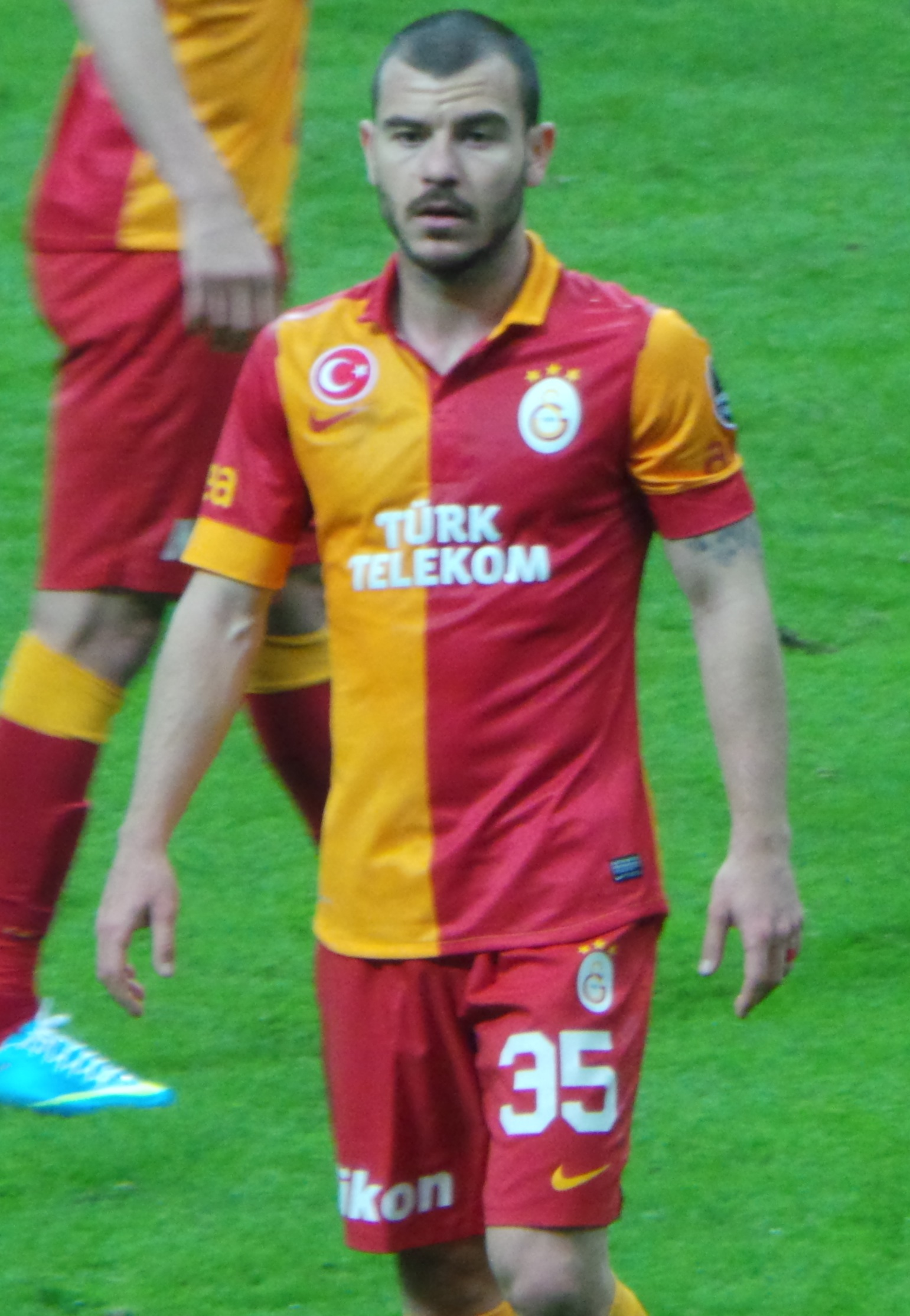
- Yekta playing for Galatasaray in 2012

Personal information
- Full name: Yekta Kurtuluş
- Date of birth: 11 December 1985 (age 40)
- Place of birth: İzmir, Turkey
- Height: 1.75 m (5 ft 9 in)
- Position: Midfielder

Youth career
- 1999–2004: İzmirspor

Senior career*
Years	Team	Apps	(Gls)
2004–2007	İzmirspor	71	(6)
2007–2011	Kasımpaşa	81	(10)
2011–2015	Galatasaray	66	(2)
2015	Sivasspor	9	(0)
2016–2020	Antalyaspor	83	(3)
2020–2021	Altay	14	(0)
2021–2023	Bodrumspor	46	(1)

International career
2010–2011	Turkey	2	(0)
- * Club domestic league appearances and goals as of 3 September 2023

Yekta Kurtuluş (Turkish pronunciation: [jectaː kuɾtuɫuʃ]; born 11 December 1985) is a Turkish professional footballer who plays as a midfielder.

== Club career ==
Yekta began his career at İzmirspor playing for the club four years, before signing for Kasımpaşa in 2007, where he was handed the number 5 kit. He made his professional debut on 25 November 2007 in a 2–0 loss over Rizespor coming in as substitute in the 55th minute. He finished his first season for the club with 16 attempts and one assist.

His performances with Kasımpaşa led to interest from several league clubs. On 11 January 2011, Yekta passed his medical and signed for four years with Galatasaray. He made his first appearance for the club one week later against Sivasspor in a 1–00 home win. He also made his first 2013–14 UEFA Champions League appearance on 26 February 2014 against Chelsea, coming in as a substitute in a 1–01 home draw.

== Career statistics ==
=== Club ===
As of 31 July 2015.

Club	Season	League		Cup		League Cup		Europe		Total	
Club	Season	Apps	Goals	Apps	Goals	Apps	Goals	Apps	Goals	Apps	Goals
İzmirspor	2004–05	20	1	1	0	—		—		21	1
İzmirspor	2005–06	21	1	0	0	—		—		21	1
İzmirspor	2006–07	30	4	0	0	—		—		30	4
İzmirspor	Total	71	6	1	1	—		—		72	6
Kasımpaşa	2007–08	16	1	1	0	—		—		17	1
Kasımpaşa	2008–09	28	3	1	0	—		—		29	3
Kasımpaşa	2009–10	25	4	5	0	—		—		30	4
Kasımpaşa	2010–11	12	2	2	1	—		—		14	3
Kasımpaşa	Total	81	10	9	1	—		—		90	11
Galatasaray	2010–11	13	0	2	0	—		0	0	15	0
Galatasaray	2011–12	3	0	0	0	0	0	—		3	0
Galatasaray	2012–13	18	1	1	0	0	0	2	0	21	1
Galatasaray	2013–14	17	1	9	1	0	0	2	0	28	2
Galatasaray	2014–15	15	0	9	4	1	0	1	0	26	4
Galatasaray	Total	66	2	21	5	1	0	5	0	93	7
Career total		218	18	31	7	1	0	5	0	255	24

=== International ===
Turkey national team
Year	Apps	Goals
2010	1	0
2011	1	0
Total	2	0

== Honours ==
Galatasaray

- Süper Lig: 2011–12, 2012–13, 2014–15
- Türkiye Kupası: 2013–14, 2014–15
- Süper Kupa: 2012, 2013
