= Emre Can Coşkun =

Turkish footballer

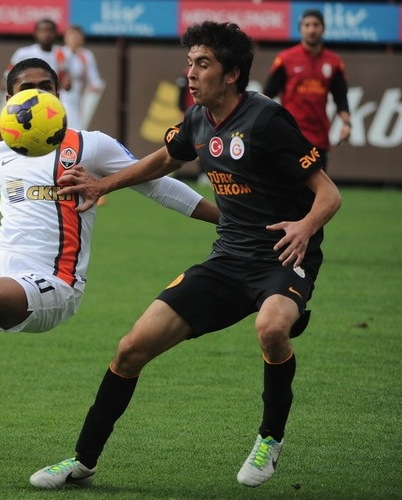
- Coşkun playing for Galatasaray against Shakhtar Donetsk in November 2013

Personal information
- Date of birth: 7 June 1994 (age 32)
- Place of birth: Istanbul, Turkey
- Height: 1.84 m (6 ft 0 in)
- Position: Centre back

Team information
- Current team: Amed
- Number: 35

Youth career
- 2006–2007: Yeni Ortabayır
- 2007–2008: Batı Trakya Türklerispor
- 2008–2013: Galatasaray

Senior career*
Years	Team	Apps	(Gls)
2013–2016	Galatasaray	0	(0)
2015	→ Denizlispor (loan)	15	(1)
2015–2016	→ Alanyaspor (loan)	16	(1)
2016	→ Giresunspor (loan)	10	(0)
2016–2018	Göztepe	16	(0)
2018	→ Adanaspor (loan)	6	(0)
2018–2019	Adanaspor	3	(0)
2019–2020	Zonguldak Kömürspor	20	(0)
2020–2021	Bodrumspor	9	(0)
2021–2022	Uşakspor	29	(0)
2022–	Amed	5	(0)

International career
2012	Turkey U19	3	(0)
2014	Turkey U20	3	(0)
2014–2016	Turkey U21	4	(0)
- * Club domestic league appearances and goals as of 20 October 2022

Emre Can Coşkun (born 7 June 1994) is a Turkish professional footballer who plays as a centre back for Amed.

== Career ==
=== Galatasaray ===
He was first selected in a Galatasaray matchday squad on 3 December 2013, remaining an unused substitute as they defeated Gaziantep BB in a penalty shootout after a 2–2 draw at the Türk Telekom Arena in the fourth round of the season's Turkish Cup. On 29 January 2014 he made his professional debut in the group stage of that competition, replacing Salih Dursun for the last 12 minutes of a 3–0 home win against Elazığspor. Three days before that, he was an unused substitute in a goalless league draw away to Gaziantepspor. On 12 February, again in the Cup group, he made his first start in a goalless home draw against Antalyaspor, making way for Guillermo Burdisso after 66 minutes. Galatasaray eventually won the trophy, but Coşkun played no further part in the season.

==== Loan to Denizlispor ====
On 2 February 2015, he was loaned to Denizlispor for the remainder of the season. On 30 June 2015, he returned to Galatasaray.

==== Loan to Alanyaspor ====
On 5 August 2015, he was loaned to Alanyaspor for the upcoming campaign. On 9 January 2016, Alanyaspor cancelled his contract, and he returned to Galatasaray. On 28 November 2015, he scored a goal against Kardemir Karabükspor, in a match which ended with a 1–1 draw.

==== Loan to Giresunspor ====
On 12 January 2016, Emre Can was loaned to Giresunspor for making progress.

==== Göztepe ====
He was signed by (then) second-tier club Göztepe in the summer of 2016. The upcoming season he gained promotion with the club to the top tier of Turkish football.

==== Loan to Adanaspor ====
He was loaned to second-tier club Adanaspor for the second part of the 2017–18 season.
