= Semih Kaya =

Turkish footballer

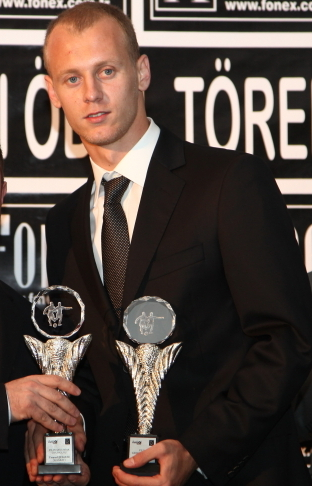

Personal information
- Date of birth: 24 February 1991 (age 35)
- Place of birth: Bergama, Turkey
- Height: 1.83 m (6 ft 0 in)
- Position: Centre back

Youth career
- 2001–2004: Petkimspor
- 2004: Helvacı Bld. Gençlik ve Spor
- 2004–2006: Altay
- 2006–2009: Galatasaray

Senior career*
Years	Team	Apps	(Gls)
2009–2017	Galatasaray	147	(5)
2010	→ Gaziantepspor (loan)	1	(0)
2010–2011	→ Kartalspor (loan)	18	(0)
2017–2020	Sparta Prague	28	(2)
2019	→ Galatasaray (loan)	5	(0)
2020–2022	Yeni Malatyaspor	54	(1)
2022	Galatasaray	2	(0)
Total		255	(8)

International career
2006	Turkey U15	2	(0)
2006–2007	Turkey U16	9	(0)
2006–2008	Turkey U17	25	(1)
2007–2009	Turkey U18	10	(0)
2009	Turkey U19	2	(0)
2009–2011	Turkey U21	4	(0)
2012–2015	Turkey	23	(0)
- * Club domestic league appearances and goals

Semih Kaya (Turkish pronunciation: [semih kaja], born 24 February 1991) is a Turkish former professional footballer who played as a centre back, most recently for Galatasaray. On 12 August 2022, he announced on his social media accounts that he was leaving football.

== Club career ==
=== Early career ===
Kaya joined Galatasaray's youth academy from Altay's youth team when he was 15.

On 25 February 2007, when he was playing against older young players in the season of Süper Gençler Ligi (Super Youth League) against Beşiktaş, in the fifth minute of the game, a kick from Batuhan Karadeniz collided with his head, forcing him to leave the game; he later went to a hospital to undergo head surgery (coagulation).

Kaya's first Süper Lig appearance was against İstanbul B.B. on 19 February 2009. After not receiving significant playing time, he joined fellow Süper Lig club Gaziantepspor on loan in January 2010 for the remainder of the season. In the summer of 2010, he signed for Turkish First League side Kartalspor on loan. On 18 October 2010, he scored two goals in the A2 Lig game against Altay.

=== Return to Galatasaray ===
At the beginning of the 2011–12 season, Kaya was not typically selected for Galatasaray's starting line-up, but following injuries to other players, notably Gökhan Zan, and a fall in form of Servet Çetin, Galatasaray coach Fatih Terim granted him a chance to prove himself. Following a series of solid performances, he soon became first-choice centreback alongside the Czech Tomáš Ujfaluši.

Kaya scored his first goal for the club against Samsunspor on 7 January 2012 in the 51st minute of a 2–0 comeback, with the game ending 4–2 for Galatasaray. In the 2011–12 season, he played 30 games and was a key member of the championship-winning squad. He continued to be first choice centre-back for the club and country, delivering calm and confident performances despite against top teams such as Manchester United and, internationally, against the Netherlands. He finished his second year with 36 appearances in all competitions. On 18 November 2013, his contract was extended for three years until 2016.

In June 2014 Inter Milan was reportedly interested in Kaya.

=== Sparta Prague ===
On 14 July 2017, Kaya left Galatasaray and joined Czech club Sparta Prague, signing a three-year contract. He was loaned to Galatasaray on 18 January 2019, for the remainder of the 2018–19 season, with the Turkish club covering his wages. On 13 July 2020, Sparta Prague announced the departure of Kaya, after an injury-plagued spell in the Czech Republic.

=== Yeni Malatyaspor ===
On 29 September 2020, Kaya joined Yeni Malatyaspor as a free agent. He left the club on 31 January 2022 on a mutual contract termination.

=== Galatasaray – third spell ===
On 3 February 2022, Kaya joined Galatasaray for the third time in his career. On 12 August 2022, he announced his retirement from professional football.

== International career ==
Kaya has played for all levels of the Turkey national team, including the under-21 level despite being at a younger age at the time. He made his debut for senior Turkish side on 29 February 2012, playing the entire game against Slovakia in a 2–1 loss. He is part of the Turkey national team for Euro 2016.

== Personal life ==
Kaya's grandfather was Macedonian Muslim or Torbeš and he emigrated from Macedonia to the Turkish city of İzmir. He is the youngest of three brothers.

== Career statistics ==
=== Club ===
Appearances and goals by club, season and competition
Club	Season	League			National cup		League cup		Europe		Total	
Club	Season	Division	Apps	Goals	Apps	Goals	Apps	Goals	Apps	Goals	Apps	Goals
Galatasaray	2008–09	Süper Lig	3	0	1	0	—		0	0	4	0
Galatasaray	2011–12	Süper Lig	30	1	1	0	—		—		31	1
Galatasaray	2012–13	Süper Lig	25	0	0	0	1	0	10	0	36	0
Galatasaray	2013–14	Süper Lig	29	0	5	0	1	0	6	0	41	0
Galatasaray	2014–15	Süper Lig	19	0	1	0	6	0	6	0	32	0
Galatasaray	2015–16	Süper Lig	21	2	0	0	6	0	4	0	31	2
Galatasaray	2016–17	Süper Lig	20	2	7	0	0	0	0	0	27	2
Galatasaray	Total		147	5	15	0	14	0	26	0	202	5
Gaziantepspor (loan)	2009–10	Süper Lig	1	0	0	0	—		—		1	0
Kartalspor (loan)	2010–11	TFF First League	18	0	1	0	—		—		19	0
Sparta Prague	2017–18	Czech First League	8	0	0	0	—		1	0	9	0
Sparta Prague	2018–19	Czech First League	10	0	0	0	—		2	0	12	0
Sparta Prague	2019–20	Czech First League	10	2	2	0	—		0	0	12	2
Sparta Prague	Total		28	2	2	0	0	0	3	0	33	2
Galatasaray (loan)	2018–19	Süper Lig	5	0	2	0	—		—		7	0
Yeni Malatyaspor	2020–21	Süper Lig	32	1	2	0	—		—		34	1
Yeni Malatyaspor	2021–22	Süper Lig	22	0	0	0	—		—		22	0
Yeni Malatyaspor	Total		54	1	2	0	0	0	0	0	56	1
Galatasaray	2021–22	Süper Lig	2	0	0	0	—		—		2	0
Career total			255	8	23	0	14	0	29	0	321	8

=== International ===
Appearances and goals by national team and year
National team	Year	Apps	Goals
Turkey	2012	8	0
Turkey	2013	8	0
Turkey	2014	5	0
Turkey	2015	2	0
Total		23	0

== Honours ==
Galatasaray

- Süper Lig: 2011–12, 2012–13, 2014–15, 2018–19
- Türkiye Kupası: 2013–14, 2014–15, 2015–16, 2018–19
- Süper Kupa: 2008, 2012, 2013, 2015, 2016

Sparta Prag

- Czech Cup : 2019–20
