= Hüseyin Göçek =

Turkish football referee (born 1976)

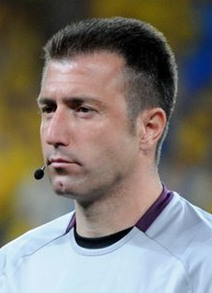
- Göçek in 2012
- Full name: Hüseyin Göçek
- Born: 30 November 1976 (age 49); Istanbul, Turkey

Domestic
Years	League	Role

International
Years	League	Role
2008–	FIFA listed	Referee

Hüseyin Göçek (born 30 November 1976) is a Turkish international referee who refereed at 2014 FIFA World Cup qualifiers.

He became a FIFA referee in 2008. He was the referee in charge of the under-21s game between Serbia and England which involved the racist and physical abuse of England's black players.
