= Furkan Özçal =

Turkish footballer (born 1990)

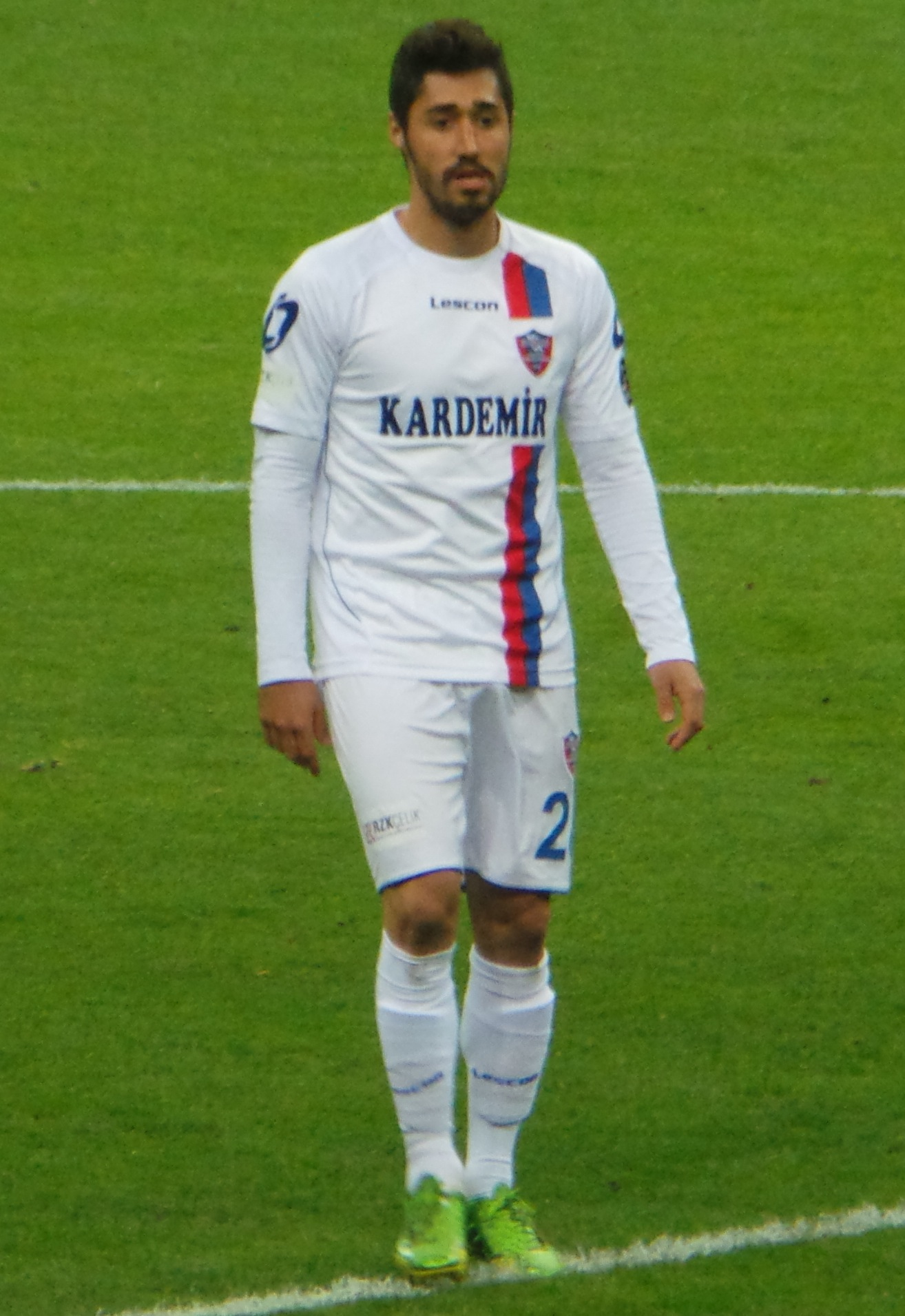
- Özçal, playing from Karabükspor in 2013

Personal information
- Date of birth: 3 September 1990 (age 36)
- Place of birth: Munich, Germany
- Height: 1.70 m (5 ft 7 in)
- Position: Attacking midfielder

Youth career
- 2005–2008: 1860 Munich

Senior career*
Years	Team	Apps	(Gls)
2008–2012	Kayserispor	66	(6)
2012–2016	Galatasaray	2	(0)
2013–2015	→ Karabükspor (loan)	38	(4)
2015–2016	→ Kayserispor (loan)	29	(1)
2016–2018	Bursaspor	0	(0)
2018–2019	Osmanlıspor	7	(2)
2019–2020	Adanaspor	27	(3)

International career
2006	Turkey U16	12	(1)
2006–2007	Turkey U17	14	(0)
2007–2008	Turkey U18	13	(1)
2007–2009	Turkey U19	11	(2)
2009–2011	Turkey U21	12	(0)
- * Club domestic league appearances and goals

Furkan Özçal (born 3 September 1990) is a Turkish former footballer who played as an attacking midfielder.

== Club career ==
He began his career with 1860 Munich, who play in the second tier of the German league, rising through the youth ranks. He was offered a professional contract and played one season with the club before signing a three-year contract with Kayserispor on 18 June 2008.

=== Galatasaray ===
Furkan was released by Kayserispor in the summer of 2012 and on 6 September 2012 he was then signed by Turkish giants Galatasaray on a free transfer.

On 18 July 2013, he left on loan to Karabükspor until the rest of the season. Furkan returned to Galatasaray after his impressive loan spell for the new season.

== Honours ==
Galatasaray

- Süper Lig (1): 2012–13
