= Manisa 19 May Stadium =

Football stadium in Manisa, Turkey

Coordinates: 38°37′23″N 27°26′24″E

- Manisa 19 Mayıs Stadyumu
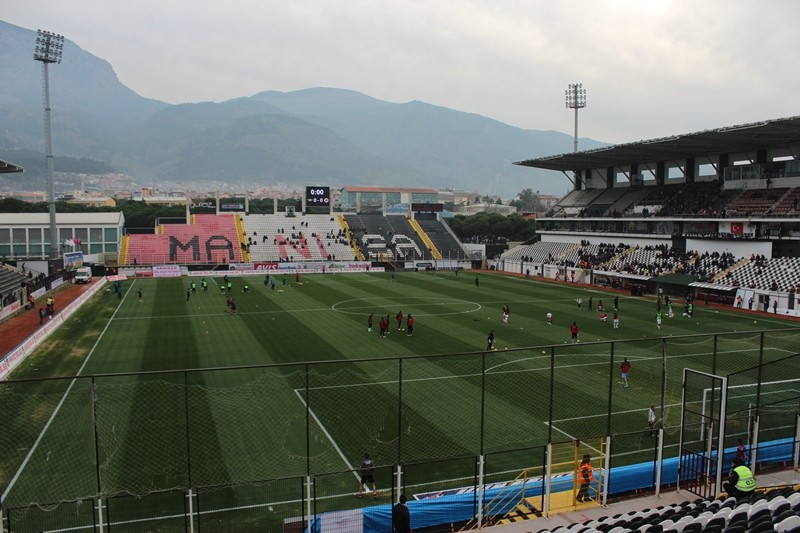
- Interactive map of Manisa 19 May Stadium
- Location: Manisa, Turkey
- Capacity: 16,597
- Surface: Turf

Construction
- Opened: 1974

Tenant
- Manisa FK

Manisa 19 May Stadium (Turkish: Manisa 19 Mayıs Stadyumu) is a multi-purpose stadium in Manisa, Turkey. It is currently used mostly for football matches and is the home ground of TFF First League team Manisa FK.

The stadium is named after the date 19 May 1919 when Mustafa Kemal Atatürk set foot on land in Samsun to start the Turkish national independence movement.

With the promotion of Manisaspor to the Turkish Süper Lig at the end of the 2008–09 season, the stadium underwent renovation, boosting the capacity from 14,280 to 16,597.

== Turkey national football team ==
The following national team match was held at the stadium.

#	Date	Score	Opponent	Competition
1.	6 February 2013	0–2	Czech Republic	Friendly
