= 2015–16 Galatasaray S.K. season =

Galatasaray
2015–16 season
- President: Dursun Aydın Özbek
- Head coach: Hamza Hamzaoğlu (until 18 November 2015); Mustafa Denizli (from 26 November 2015 to 29 February 2016); Orhan Atik (caretaker, from 1 March to 16 March 2016); Jan Olde Riekerink (from 16 March 2016)
- Stadium: Türk Telekom Arena
- Süper Lig: 6th
- Turkish Cup: Winners
- Turkish Super Cup: Winners
- UEFA Champions League: Group stage (3rd)
- UEFA Europa League: Round of 32
- Top goalscorer: League: Lukas Podolski (13); All: Lukas Podolski (17)
- Highest home attendance: 37,748 vs Fenerbahçe (Süper Lig, 13 April 2016)
- Lowest home attendance: 5,000 vs Akhisar BGS (Turkish Cup, 17 December 2015)
- Average home league attendance: 18,996
| Home colours | Away colours | Third colours |

The 2015–16 season was Galatasaray's 112th in existence and 58th consecutive season in the Süper Lig. They were aiming to lift an unprecedented 21st Turkish title, after winning the Süper Lig in the previous season.

In Europe, Galatasaray competed in the UEFA Champions League for a fifteenth season. They also competed in the UEFA Europa League, the Turkish Cup and the Turkish Super Cup.

This article shows statistics of the club's players in the season, and also lists all matches that the club played in the season. The season covered a period from 1 July 2015 to 30 June 2016.

== Club ==
=== Technical Staff ===
| Position | Staff |
|---|---|
| Manager | (Netherlands) Jan Olde Riekerink |
| Fitness Coach | (Italy) Stefano Marrone |
| Goalkeeper Coach | (Brazil) Cláudio Taffarel |
| Chief Scout | (Turkey) Emre Utkucan |

=== Medical Staff ===
| Position | Staff |
|---|---|
| Doctor | (Turkey) Yener İnce (Turkey) Gürbey Kahveci |
| Physiotherapist | (Turkey) Mustafa Korkmaz (Turkey) Burak Koca (Turkey) Samet Polat |
| Masseur | (Turkey) Cenk Akkaya (Turkey) Sedat Peker (Turkey) Batuhan Erkan |

=== Board of directors ===
| Position | Staff |
|---|---|
| President | (Turkey) Dursun Aydın Özbek |
| Vice-President | (Turkey) Cengiz Özyalçın |
| Vice-President | (Turkey) Nasuhi Sezgin |
| Vice-President | (Turkey) Eşref Alaçayır |
| | (Turkey) Can Topsakal |
| | (Turkey) Fatih İşbecer |
| | (Turkey) Tayfun Demir |
| | (Turkey) İsmail Sarıkaya |
| | (Turkey) Ural Aküzüm |
| | (Turkey) Tarık Taşar |
| | (Turkey) Alper Narman |
| | (Turkey) Hasan Murat Atay |
| | (Turkey) Ali Yüce |
| | (Turkey) Burçin Aslan |
| | (Turkey) Selim Arda Üçer |

=== Grounds ===
| Ground (capacity and dimensions) | Türk Telekom Arena (52,652 / 105x68m) |
| Training ground | Florya Metin Oktay Sports Complex and Training Center |

=== Kit ===
Uniform Manufacturer: Nike

Chest Advertising's: United Nations Development Programme (for League) / Turkish Airlines (for CL)

Back Advertising's: Garenta

Arm Advertising's: N/A

Short Advertising's: Coca-Cola

Socks Advertising's: Ariston Thermo

Home
Away
Third

== Sponsorship ==
Companies that Galatasaray S.K. had sponsorship deals with during the season included the following.

| Licensee | Product |
|---|---|
| United Nations Development Programme | Main Sponsor (Süper Lig) |
| Turkish Airlines | Main Sponsor (UEFA Champions League) |
| Coca-Cola | Co-sponsor |
| Nike | Technical Sponsor |
| Opel | Official sponsor |
| Microsoft | Official Sponsor |
| Garenta | Official Sponsor |
| HDI-Gerling | Official Sponsor |
| Medical Park | Official Sponsor |
| Yandex | Official Sponsor |
| MNG Kargo | Official Sponsor |
| Sarar | Official Sponsor |
| Denizbank | Official Sponsor |
| W Collection | Official Sponsor |
| Fox International Channels | Media Sponsor |
| TTNET | Media Sponsor |
| Perform | Media Sponsor |
| Lukoil | Official Supplier |
| Diversey | Official Supplier |
| GNC | Official Supplier |

== Season overview ==
- On 31 May 2015, Galatasaray revealed the pre-season summer camp schedule. The camp schedule for the Galatasaray professional football team prior to the next football season began on 5 July at the Windischgarsten, Austria.
- On 13 June 2015, it was announced that head coach Hamza Hamzaoğlu had extended his ongoing contract for three more years.
- On 17 June 2015, it was announced that Galatasaray had begun official negotiations regarding the transfer of Turkish player Bilal Kısa from Akhisar Belediyespor.
- On 18 June 2015, it was announced that defender Sabri Sarıoğlu had extended his contract until 2016.
- On 25 June 2015, it was announced that Galatasaray had sold Nordin Amrabat to Málaga. Málaga had triggered the €3.5 million buyout clause for him.
- On 26 June 2015, it was announced that Galatasaray would not participate in the Afyon Cup between 11 and 14 July. Instead, the club played against SV Ried in Austria on 14 July.
- On 28 June 2015, Galatasaray's second pre-season camp schedule was announced. The second camp prior to the start of the league season began on 20 July at the Velden in Austria.
- On 2 July 2015, it was announced that Galatasaray had loaned out Endoğan Adili to FC Wil.
- On 2 July 2015, it was announced that Galatasaray had begun official negotiations regarding the transfer of German player Lukas Podolski from Arsenal. The original bid by Galatasaray was reported as €2.5 million, with Podolski also receiving a salary of €3 million per year.
- On 7 July 2015, it was announced that Galatasaray had sold Goran Pandev to Genoa.
- On 8 July 2015, it was announced that Galatasaray had begun official negotiations regarding the transfer of Turkish player Jem Paul Karacan from Reading. Cem Karacan was set to receive a salary of €0.6 million per year.
- On 11 July 2015, it was announced that Galatasaray had begun official negotiations regarding the transfer of French player Lionel Carole from Troyes. The original bid by Galatasaray was reported as €1.5 million, with Carole also receiving a salary of €0.7 million per year.
- On 14 July 2015, it was announced that Galatasaray had loaned out winger Bruma to Real Sociedad for €1.9 million. Real Sociedad also had a buy-out option for €7.5 million.
- On 20 July 2015, it was announced that Dany Nounkeu, Lucas Ontivero, Furkan Özçal and Umut Gündoğan would not be included the second camp squad.
- On 23 July 2015, Galatasaray's 2015–16 home and away kits were revealed.
- On 30 July 2015, it was announced that the contract of Dany Nounkeu had been terminated by Galatasaray.
- On 31 July 2015, it was announced that Galatasaray had begun official negotiations regarding the transfer of Spanish player José Rodríguez from Real Madrid. Galatasaray would not be paying any transfer fee for the player, and José Rodríguez was also receiving a salary of €800,000 per year.
- On 5 August 2015, it was announced that Berk İsmail Ünsal and Emre Can Coşkun had been loaned out to Giresunspor and Alanyaspor, respectively.
- On 5 August 2015, it was announced that the club had extended the contracts of Alperen Uysal and Furkan Özçal. Subsequently, they were loaned out to Gaziantepspor and Kayserispor, respectively.
- On 6 August 2015, it was announced that Yekta Kurtuluş and Blerim Džemaili had not been included in the league squad. They were placed on the transfer list by the club.
- On 6 August 2015, it was announced that Galatasaray would participate in the Trofeo Bernabéu against Real Madrid on 18 August.
- On 8 August 2015, Galatasaray won the 2015 Turkish Super Cup against Bursaspor.
- On 13 August 2015, it was announced that Sercan Yıldırım had been loaned out to Bursaspor.
- On 13 August 2015, it was announced that Felipe Melo had extended his contract until 2019.
- On 17 August 2015, it was announced that the contract of Yekta Kurtuluş had been terminated by Galatasaray for €600,000.
- On 27 August 2015, it was announced that Umut Gündoğan had been loaned out to Şanlıurfaspor until the end of the season.
- On 28 August 2015, it was announced that Galatasaray had begun official negotiations regarding the transfer of Turkish player Cenk Gönen from Beşiktaş. The original bid by Galatasaray was reported as €600,000, with Cenk also receiving a salary of €900,000 per year.
- On 29 August 2015, it was announced that Galatasaray had begun official negotiations regarding the transfer of Belgian player Jason Denayer from Manchester City. The original bid by Galatasaray was reported as €430,000, with Denayer also receiving a salary of €800,000.
- On 30 August 2015, it was announced that Blerim Džemaili had been loaned out to Genoa.
- On 31 August 2015, it was announced that Alex Telles had been loaned out to Inter Milan for €1.3 million. Inter also had a buy-out option for €8.5 million.
- On 31 August 2015, it was announced that Felipe Melo had been sold to Inter Milan for €3.7 million.
- On 31 August 2015, it was announced that Galatasaray had begun official negotiations regarding the transfer of German player Kevin Großkreutz from Borussia Dortmund. The original bid by Galatasaray was reported as €1.5 million, with Großkreutz also receiving a salary of €1.85 million for the first year.
- On 2 September 2015, it was announced by FIFA that Galatasaray had failed to submit the relevant documentation for Kevin Großkreutz before the transfer window had closed. FIFA dismissed the case, because the signed documentations were not submitted on time by Galatasaray. FIFA refused to sanction Großkreutz's proposed move from Borussia Dortmund, and therefore the player was not available for Galatasaray until 1 January 2016.
- On 3 October 2015, it was announced that the contract of Wesley Sneijder had been extended by Galatasaray until 2018.
- On 9 October 2015, it was announced that the contract of Hakan Balta had been extended by Galatasaray until 2018.
- On 18 November 2015, Galatasaray announced the dismissal of head coach Hamza Hamzaoğlu.
- On 18 November 2015, it was announced that Galatasaray had entered negotiations with Mustafa Denizli.
- On 5 January 2016, it was announced that Galatasaray had begun official negotiations regarding the transfer of Dutch player Ryan Donk from Kasımpaşa. The original bid by Galatasaray was reported as €2.5 million, with Donk also receiving a salary of €750,000 during the second half of the season.
- On 6 January 2016, it was announced that Kevin Großkreutz had been sold to VfB Stuttgart for €2.2 million.
- On 12 January 2016, it was announced that Galatasaray had begun official negotiations regarding the transfer of Norwegian player Martin Linnes from Molde. The original bid by Galatasaray was reported as €2 million, with Linnes also receiving a salary of €475,000 during the second half of the season.
- On 1 February 2016, it was announced that Jem Karacan had been loaned out to Bursaspor for the rest of the season.
- On 5 February 2016, it was announced that Burak Yılmaz had been sold to Beijing Guoan for €8 million.
- On 1 March 2016, Galatasaray announced the dismissal of head coach Mustafa Denizli.
- On 2 March 2016, Galatasaray was banned from European competitions for one season by UEFA. Galatasaray were not able to qualify for either the UEFA Champions League or UEFA Europa League this season due to their failure to comply with financial regulations. The ban would come into force the first time that the Istanbul club qualified for either the Champions League or the Europa League within the next two seasons, though the sanction would be waived if Galatasaray failed to qualify for any continental competition in that timeframe.
- On 16 March 2016, Galatasaray announced that interim manager Jan Olde Riekerink would become the head of youth development.

== Players ==
=== Squad information ===
| N | Pos. | Nat. | Name | Age | EU | Since | App | Goals | Ends | Transfer fee | Notes |
|---|---|---|---|---|---|---|---|---|---|---|---|
| 1 | GK | (Uruguay) | Fernando Muslera | 40 | EU | 2011 | 209 | 1 | 2018 | €6.75M + Lorik Cana | |
| 4 | MF | (Turkey) | Hamit Altıntop | 43 | EU | 2012 | 79 | 3 | 2016 | €3.5M | |
| 5 | MF | (Turkey) | Bilal Kısa | 43 | Non-EU | 2015 | 36 | 8 | 2017 | Free | |
| 7 | MF | (Turkey) | Yasin Öztekin | 39 | EU | 2014 | 83 | 14 | 2018 | €2.5M | |
| 8 | MF | (Turkey) | Selçuk İnan (C) | 41 | Non-EU | 2011 | 214 | 49 | 2019 | Free | |
| 17 | FW | (Turkey) | Burak Yılmaz | 41 | Non-EU | 2012 | 141 | 82 | 2019 | €5M | Left the team after mid-season |
| 10 | MF | (Netherlands) | Wesley Sneijder (VC) | 42 | EU | 2013 | 143 | 40 | 2018 | €7.5M | |
| 11 | FW | (Germany) | Lukas Podolski | 41 | EU | 2015 | 43 | 17 | 2018 | €2.5M | |
| 14 | MF | (Spain) | José Rodríguez | 31 | EU | 2015 | 23 | 0 | 2019 | Free | |
| 15 | DF | (Netherlands) | Ryan Donk | 40 | EU | 2016 | 22 | 1 | 2018 | €2.5M | |
| 18 | MF | (Turkey) | Sinan Gümüş | 32 | EU | 2014 | 34 | 12 | 2018 | Free | |
| 21 | DF | (Cameroon) | Aurélien Chedjou | 41 | EU | 2013 | 98 | 11 | 2017 | €6.3M | |
| 22 | DF | (Turkey) | Hakan Balta | 43 | EU | 2007 | 310 | 12 | 2018 | €1M + Ferhat Öztorun | |
| 23 | DF | (France) | Lionel Carole | 35 | EU | 2015 | 33 | 0 | 2018 | €1.5M | |
| 26 | DF | (Turkey) | Semih Kaya | 35 | Non-EU | 2008 | 175 | 3 | 2018 | Youth system | |
| 27 | DF | (Norway) | Martin Linnes | 35 | Non-EU | 2016 | 17 | 0 | 2019 | €2M | |
| 28 | DF | (Turkey) | Koray Günter | 32 | EU | 2014 | 41 | 0 | 2018 | €2.5M | |
| 29 | MF | (Turkey) | Olcan Adın | 41 | Non-EU | 2014 | 84 | 9 | 2018 | €4M + Salih Dursun | |
| 38 | DF | (Turkey) | Tarık Çamdal | 35 | EU | 2014 | 38 | 0 | 2018 | €4.75M | |
| 52 | MF | (Turkey) | Emre Çolak | 35 | Non-EU | 2009 | 176 | 17 | 2016 | Youth system | |
| 55 | DF | (Turkey) | Sabri Sarıoğlu | 42 | Non-EU | 2002 | 347 | 17 | 2017 | Youth system | |
| 64 | DF | (Belgium) | Jason Denayer | 31 | EU | 2015 | 28 | 0 | 2016 | €0.43M | On loan from Manchester City |
| 67 | GK | (Turkey) | Eray İşcan | 35 | Non-EU | 2011 | 13 | 0 | 2016 | Youth system | |
| 99 | GK | (Turkey) | Cenk Gönen | 38 | Non-EU | 2015 | 4 | 0 | 2018 | €0.6M | |

- Last updated: 27 May 2016
- Source: Galatasaray.org, Players in / out, Wikipedia players' articles, and footballdatabase.com (for EU passport)
- Ordered by Last season starting 11 and position on pitch (from back right to front left).

=== Transfers ===
==== In ====
| No. | Pos. | Nat. | Name | Age | EU | Moving from | Type | Transfer window | Ends | Transfer fee | Source |
|---|---|---|---|---|---|---|---|---|---|---|---|
| 27 | DF | (Cameroon) | Dany Nounkeu | 40 | EU | Evian (France) | Loan return | Summer | 2015 | N/A | |
| 19 | FW | (Turkey) | Sercan Yıldırım | 36 | Non-EU | Balıkesirspor (Turkey) | Loan return | Summer | 2015 | N/A | |
| 30 | MF | (Turkey) | Furkan Özçal | 36 | EU | Karabükspor (Turkey) | Loan return | Summer | 2015 | N/A | |
| 90 | MF | (Turkey) | Umut Gündoğan | 36 | EU | Adana Demirspor (Turkey) | Loan return | Summer | 2015 | N/A | |
| 41 | FW | (Turkey) | Berk İsmail Ünsal | 32 | EU | Antalyaspor (Turkey) | Loan return | Summer | 2015 | N/A | |
| 5 | MF | (Turkey) | Bilal Kısa | 43 | Non-EU | Akhisar Belediyespor (Turkey) | Transfer | Summer | 2017 | Free | KAP.gov.tr |
| 6 | MF | (Turkey) | Jem Karacan | 37 | EU | Reading (England) | Transfer | Summer | 2018 | Free | KAP.gov.tr |
| 14 | MF | (Spain) | José Rodríguez | 31 | EU | Real Madrid (Spain) | Transfer | Summer | 2019 | Free | KAP.gov.tr |
| 23 | DF | (France) | Lionel Carole | 35 | EU | Troyes (France) | Transfer | Summer | 2018 | €1.5M | KAP.gov.tr |
| 11 | FW | (Germany) | Lukas Podolski | 41 | EU | Arsenal (England) | Transfer | Summer | 2018 | €2.5M | KAP.gov.tr |
| 99 | GK | (Turkey) | Cenk Gönen | 38 | Non-EU | Beşiktaş (Turkey) | Transfer | Summer | 2018 | €0.6M | KAP.gov.tr |
| 64 | DF | (Belgium) | Jason Denayer | 31 | EU | Manchester City (England) | Loan | Summer | 2016 | €0.43M | KAP.gov.tr |
| 12 | DF | (Germany) | Kevin Großkreutz | 38 | EU | Borussia Dortmund (Germany) | Transfer | Summer | 2018 | €1.5M | KAP.gov.tr |
| 15 | DF | (Netherlands) | Ryan Donk | 40 | EU | Kasımpaşa | Transfer | Winter | 2018 | €2.5M | KAP.gov.tr |
| 27 | DF | (Norway) | Martin Linnes | 35 | EU | Molde | Transfer | Winter | 2019 | €2M | KAP.gov.tr |

Total spending: ▼€11M

==== Out ====
| No. | Pos. | Nat. | Name | Age | EU | Moving to | Type | Transfer window | Transfer fee | Source |
|---|---|---|---|---|---|---|---|---|---|---|
| 3 | MF | (Brazil) | Felipe Melo | 43 | EU | Internazionale (Italy) | Transfer | Summer | €3.7M | KAP.gov.tr |
| 53 | MF | (Morocco) | Nordin Amrabat | 39 | EU | Málaga (Spain) | Transfer | Summer | €3.5M | KAP.gov.tr |
| 11 | MF | (Portugal) | Bruma | 32 | EU | Real Sociedad (Spain) | Loan | Summer | €1.9M | KAP.gov.tr |
| 13 | DF | (Brazil) | Alex Telles | 34 | EU | Internazionale (Italy) | Loan | Summer | €1.3M | KAP.gov.tr |
| 23 | MF | (Turkey) | Furkan Özçal | 36 | EU | Kayserispor (Turkey) | Loan | Summer | €0.5M | KAP.gov.tr |
| 6 | MF | (Switzerland) | Blerim Džemaili | 40 | EU | Genoa (Italy) | Loan | Summer | N/A | KAP.gov.tr |
| 90 | MF | (Turkey) | Umut Gündoğan | 36 | EU | Şanlıurfaspor (Turkey) | Loan | Summer | N/A | KAP.gov.tr |
| 94 | MF | (Argentina) | Lucas Ontivero | 32 | EU | Olimpija Ljubljana (Slovakia) | Loan | Summer | Free | KAP.gov.tr |
| | MF | (Switzerland) | Endoğan Adili | 32 | EU | FC Wil (Switzerland) | Loan | Summer | N/A | KAP.gov.tr |
| 19 | FW | (Turkey) | Sercan Yıldırım | 36 | Non-EU | Bursaspor (Turkey) | Loan | Summer | N/A | KAP.gov.tr |
| 41 | FW | (Turkey) | Berk İsmail Ünsal | 32 | Non-EU | Giresunspor (Turkey) | Loan | Summer | N/A | KAP.gov.tr |
| 40 | DF | (Turkey) | Emre Can Coşkun | 32 | Non-EU | Alanyaspor (Turkey) | Loan | Summer | N/A | KAP.gov.tr |
| 45 | MF | (Turkey) | Oğuzhan Kayar | 31 | Non-EU | Gaziantep Büyükşehir Belediyespor (Turkey) | Loan | Summer | N/A | KAP.gov.tr |
| 68 | GK | (Turkey) | Alperen Uysal | 32 | Non-EU | Gaziantepspor (Turkey) | Loan | Summer | N/A | KAP.gov.tr |
| 27 | DF | (Cameroon) | Dany Nounkeu | 40 | EU | Bursaspor (Turkey) | Contract termination | Summer | Free | KAP.gov.tr |
| 35 | MF | (Turkey) | Yekta Kurtuluş | 40 | Non-EU | Sivasspor (Turkey) | Contract termination | Summer | Free | KAP.gov.tr |
| 19 | FW | (North Macedonia) | Goran Pandev | 43 | EU | Genoa (Italy) | Transfer | Summer | Free | Genoa C.F.C. |
| 27 | DF | (Ivory Coast) | Emmanuel Eboué | 43 | EU | | End of contract | Summer | Free | |
| 5 | DF | (Turkey) | Gökhan Zan | 45 | Non-EU | | End of contract | Summer | Free | |
| 7 | MF | (Turkey) | Aydın Yılmaz | 38 | Non-EU | Kasımpaşa (Turkey) | End of contract | Summer | Free | AslanStatistic |
| 32 | MF | (Turkey) | İbrahim Coşkun | 31 | EU | Trabzonspor (Turkey) | Transfer | Summer | N/A | AslanStatistic |
| 38 | GK | (Turkey) | Sinan Bolat | 38 | EU | Porto (Portugal) | Loan return | Summer | N/A | NTVSpor.net |
| | DF | (Turkey) | Recep Burak Yılmaz | 30 | Non-EU | Kartalspor (Turkey) | Loan | Summer | N/A | AslanStatistic |
| | DF | (Turkey) | Gökcan Gelmen | 30 | Non-EU | Fatih Karagümrük SK (Turkey) | Transfer | Summer | N/A | AslanStatistic |
| 12 | DF | (Germany) | Kevin Großkreutz | 38 | EU | VfB Stuttgart (Germany) | Transfer | Winter | €2.2M | KAP.gov.tr |
| 40 | DF | (Turkey) | Emre Can Coşkun | 32 | Non-EU | Giresunspor (Turkey) | Loan | Winter | N/A | KAP.gov.tr |
| 45 | MF | (Turkey) | Oğuzhan Kayar | 31 | Non-EU | Şanlıurfaspor (Turkey) | Loan | Winter | N/A | KAP.gov.tr |
| 94 | MF | (Argentina) | Lucas Ontivero | 32 | EU | Montreal Impact (Canada) | Loan | Winter | €0.225M | KAP.gov.tr |
| 6 | MF | (Turkey) | Jem Karacan | 37 | EU | Bursaspor (Turkey) | Loan | Winter | N/A | KAP.gov.tr |
| 17 | FW | (Turkey) | Burak Yılmaz | 41 | Non-EU | Beijing Guoan (China) | Transfer | Winter | €8M | KAP.gov.tr |

Total income: ▲€21.3M

Expenditure: ▲€10.3M

== Competitions ==
=== Overall ===
| Trophy | Started round | First match | Result | Last match |
|---|---|---|---|---|
| Süper Lig | N/A | 16 August 2015 | 6th | 19 May 2016 |
| Turkish Cup | Group stage | 17 December 2015 | Winners | 22 May 2016 |
| Turkish Super Cup | Final | 8 August 2015 | Winners | |
| Champions League | Group stage | 15 September 2015 | Group stage (3rd) | 8 December 2015 |
| Europa League | Round of 32 | 18 February 2016 | Round of 32 | 25 February 2016 |

=== Pre-season, Mid-Season and friendlies ===
| 11 July 2015 Friendly | Galatasaray | 2–1 | Vysočina Jihlava | Windischgarsten, Austria |
| 20:30 EEST | Gümüş | Report | Mešanović (pen.) |

| 14 July 2015 Friendly | Galatasaray | 3–2 | SV Ried | Windischgarsten, Austria |
| 20:00 EEST | Yıldırım 80'; Carole 84'; Kısa 90' | Report | Mayr-Falten 53'; Trauner 59' |

| 22 July 2015 Friendly | Galatasaray | 2–1 | Celta Vigo | Linz, Austria |
| 21:30 EEST | Çolak (pen.); Podolski | Report | Aspas | Stadium: Linzer Stadion |

| 25 July 2015 Friendly | Galatasaray | 0–0 | Udinese | Klagenfurt, Austria |
| 21:00 EEST | | | | Stadium: Wörthersee Stadion |

| 28 July 2015 Friendly | Galatasaray | 0–4 | Nice | Dravograd, Slovenia |
| 19:45 EEST | | | Ben Arfa (pen.); Eysseric; Benrahma (pen.); Maupay | Stadium: Dravograd Sports Centre |

| 2 August 2015 Friendly | Galatasaray | 1–0 | Internazionale | Istanbul, Turkey |
| 20:30 EEST | Sneijder | | | Stadium: Türk Telekom Arena |

| 18 August 2015 Trofeo Bernabéu | Real Madrid | 2–1 | Galatasaray | Madrid, Spain |
| 23:30 EEST | Nacho 17'; Marcelo 81' | Report | Sneijder 53' | Stadium: Santiago Bernabéu Stadium; Attendance: 81.044 |

| 10 October 2015 Friendly | Galatasaray | 1–0 | Panthrakikos | Komotini, Greece |
| 18:30 EEST | Sarıoğlu 73' | Report | | Stadium: Komotini Municipal Stadium |

| 14 November 2015 Friendly | FK Sarajevo | 3–3 | Galatasaray | Sarajevo, Bosnia and Herzegovina |
| 19:30 EEST | Duljević 27'; Bekić 44', 46' | Report | Adın 13'; Gümüş 24'; Ergün 70' | Stadium: Asim Ferhatović Hase Stadium |

=== Turkish Super Cup ===
| 8 August 2015 Final | Galatasaray | 1–0 | Bursaspor | Ankara, Turkey |
| | Öztekin 22' | Report | | Stadium: Osmanlı Stadyumu; Referee: Cüneyt Çakır; Man of the Match: Yasin Öztekin |

Source: Competitive Matches

=== Süper Lig ===
==== League table ====
| Pos | Team | Pld | W | D | L | GF | GA | GD | Pts | Qualification or relegation |
|---|---|---|---|---|---|---|---|---|---|---|
| 4 | İstanbul Başakşehir | 34 | 16 | 11 | 7 | 54 | 36 | +18 | 59 | Qualification for the Europa League third qualifying round (Note: Since the winners of the 2015–16 Turkish Cup, Galatasaray, were excluded from European competitions by UEFA, the Europa League group stage berth awarded to the Turkish Cup winners was transferred to the third-placed team (Konyaspor), the third qualifying round berth was awarded to the fourth-placed team (İstanbul Başakşehir), and the second qualifying round berth was awarded to the fifth-placed team (Osmanlıspor).) |
| 5 | Osmanlıspor | 34 | 14 | 10 | 10 | 52 | 36 | +16 | 52 | Qualification for the Europa League second qualifying round |
| 6 | Galatasaray (Note: Galatasaray would have qualified for the Europa League group stage by winning the 2015–16 Turkish Cup, but were excluded by the Adjudicatory Chamber of the UEFA Club Financial Control Body (CFCB).) | 34 | 13 | 12 | 9 | 69 | 49 | +20 | 51 | |
| 7 | Kasımpaşa | 34 | 14 | 8 | 12 | 50 | 40 | +10 | 50 | |
| 8 | Akhisar Belediyespor | 34 | 11 | 13 | 10 | 42 | 41 | +1 | 46 | |

Source: Süper Lig, Soccerway
Rules for classification: 1) Points; 2) Head-to-head points; 3) Head-to-head goal difference; 4) Head-to-head goals scored; 5) Goal difference; 6) Goals scored; 7) Play-off.

==== Results summary ====
| Overall | | | | | | | | Home | | | | | | Away | | | | | |
| Pld | W | D | L | GF | GA | GD | Pts | W | D | L | GF | GA | GD | W | D | L | GF | GA | GD |
|---|---|---|---|---|---|---|---|---|---|---|---|---|---|---|---|---|---|---|---|
| 34 | 13 | 12 | 9 | 69 | 49 | +20 | 51 | 9 | 6 | 2 | 40 | 18 | +22 | 4 | 6 | 7 | 29 | 31 | −2 |

Source: Competitive Matches

==== Results by round ====
| Round | 1 | 2 | 3 | 4 | 5 | 6 | 7 | 8 | 9 | 10 | 11 | 12 | 13 | 14 | 15 | 16 | 17 | 18 | 19 | 20 | 21 | 22 | 23 | 24 | 25 | 26 | 27 | 28 | 29 | 30 | 31 | 32 | 33 | 34 |
|---|---|---|---|---|---|---|---|---|---|---|---|---|---|---|---|---|---|---|---|---|---|---|---|---|---|---|---|---|---|---|---|---|---|---|
| Ground | A | H | A | H | A | H | A | H | A | H | A | H | A | H | A | H | A | H | A | H | A | H | A | H | A | H | A | H | A | H | A | H | A | H |
| Result | D | L | W | D | W | W | W | W | D | W | L | D | D | W | L | W | D | W | L | D | L | W | L | D | D | D | L | D | L | W | D | L | W | W |
| Position | 7 | 13 | 10 | 8 | 8 | 4 | 2 | 2 | 2 | 2 | 3 | 3 | 4 | 4 | 4 | 3 | 3 | 3 | 3 | 3 | 5 | 3 | 5 | 5 | 5 | 6 | 6 | 6 | 8 | 6 | 6 | 7 | 6 | 6 |

Source: Competitive Matches
A = Away; H = Home; W = Win; D = Draw; L = Loss

==== Matches ====
| 15 August 2015 1 | Sivasspor | 2–2 | Galatasaray | Sivas |
| 22:00 EEST | Chahechouhe 10', 55' (pen.) | Report | Yılmaz 60'; Podolski 81' | Stadium: Sivas 4 Eylül Stadium; Attendance: 4,250; Referee: Barış Şimşek |

| 24 August 2015 2 | Galatasaray | 1–2 | Osmanlıspor | Istanbul |
| 21:45 EEST | İnan 41' | Report | Deliktaş 29'; Torje 50' | Stadium: Türk Telekom Arena; Attendance: 17,000; Referee: Hüseyin Göçek |

| 29 August 2015 3 | Konyaspor | 1–4 | Galatasaray | Konya |
| 21:15 EEST | Meha 37' | Report | Yılmaz 9'; Kaya 40'; Sneijder 89', 90+4' | Stadium: New Konya Stadium; Attendance: 26,792; Referee: Fırat Aydınus |

| 12 September 2015 4 | Galatasaray | 1–1 | Mersin İdman Yurdu | Istanbul |
| 20:00 EEST | Podolski 50' | Report | Welliton 49' | Stadium: Türk Telekom Arena; Attendance: 21,450; Referee: Mete Kalkavan |

| 19 September 2015 5 | Trabzonspor | 0–1 | Galatasaray | Trabzon |
| 20:00 EEST | | Report | Mbia 82' (o.g.) | Stadium: Hüseyin Avni Aker Stadium; Attendance: 20,384; Referee: Cüneyt Çakır |

| 26 September 2015 6 | Galatasaray | 2–1 | Gaziantepspor | Istanbul |
| 19:00 EEST | Podolski 11'; Bulut 56' | Report | Demir 9' | Stadium: Türk Telekom Arena; Attendance: 20,012; Referee: Alper Ulusoy |

| 3 October 2015 7 | İstanbul Başakşehir | 0–2 | Galatasaray | Istanbul |
| 19:00 EEST | | Report | Podolski 77'; Bulut 84' | Stadium: Başakşehir Arena; Attendance: 6,793; Referee: Serdar Tokat |

| 17 October 2015 8 | Galatasaray | 4–1 | Gençlerbirliği | Istanbul |
| 19:00 EEST | Kısa 49'; Chedjou 53'; Öztekin 68'; Yılmaz 87' (pen.) | Report | El Kabir 37' | Stadium: Türk Telekom Arena; Attendance: 22,825; Referee: Çağatay Şahan |

| 25 October 2015 9 | Fenerbahçe | 1–1 | Galatasaray | Istanbul |
| 18:00 EEST | Diego 37' | Report | Adın 84' | Stadium: Şükrü Saracoğlu Stadium; Attendance: 45,070; Referee: Fırat Aydınus |

| 29 October 2015 10 | Galatasaray | 4–0 | Eskişehirspor | Istanbul |
| 21:45 EEST | İnan 9'; Yılmaz 41', 45' (pen.); Kısa 85' | Report | | Stadium: Türk Telekom Arena; Attendance: 21,092; Referee: Bülent Yıldırım |

| 8 November 2015 11 | Çaykur Rizespor | 4–3 | Galatasaray | Rize |
| 18:00 EEST | Akyüz 19', 45'; Kweuke 90'; Kadah 90' | Report | Sneijder 4'; Podolski 65'; Adın 75' | Stadium: Yeni Rize Şehir Stadı; Attendance: 3,340 |

| 21 November 2015 12 | Galatasaray | 3–3 | Antalyaspor | Istanbul |
| 20:15 EEST | Öztekin 9'; Podolski 66'; İnan 90' | Report | Badur 64'; Eto'o 82' (pen.); Etame 90' | Stadium: Türk Telekom Arena; Attendance: 24,800; Referee: Ali Palabıyık |

| 29 November 2015 13 | Kasımpaşa | 2–2 | Galatasaray | Istanbul |
| 20:15 EEST | Arslan 32'; Titi 76' | Report | Yılmaz 13'; Balta 51' | Stadium: Recep Tayyip Erdoğan Stadium; Attendance: 4.001; Referee: Halis Özkahya |

| 4 December 2015 14 | Galatasaray | 3–0 | Bursaspor | Istanbul |
| 20:00 EEST | Podolski 68'; Öztekin 80'; Yılmaz 89' | Report | | Stadium: Türk Telekom Arena; Attendance: 21,653; Referee: Suat Arslanboğa |

| 14 December 2015 15 | Beşiktaş | 2–1 | Galatasaray | Istanbul |
| 20:00 EEST | Gómez 56'; Töre 74' | Report | Sneijder 54' | Stadium: Atatürk Olympic Stadium; Attendance: 25,801; Referee: Mete Kalkavan |

| 20 December 2015 16 | Galatasaray | 3–2 | Akhisar Belediyespor | Istanbul |
| 16:00 EEST | Bulut 26'; Podolski 39'; Öztekin 56' | Report | N'Guémo 48'; Rodallega 74' | Stadium: Türk Telekom Arena; Attendance: 19,080; Referee: Deniz Ateş Bitnel |

| 27 December 2015 17 | Kayserispor | 1–1 | Galatasaray | Kayseri |
| 16:00 EEST | Mabiala 16' | Report | Gümüş 61' | Stadium: Kadir Has Stadium; Attendance: 6,463; Referee: Barış Şimşek |

| 16 January 2016 18 | Galatasaray | 3–1 | Sivasspor | Istanbul |
| 19:00 EEST | İnan 14' (pen.); Gümüş 24'; Yılmaz 86' (pen.) | Report | Texeira 69' | Stadium: Türk Telekom Arena; Attendance: 17,740; Referee: Cüneyt Çakır |

| 23 January 2016 19 | Osmanlıspor | 3–2 | Galatasaray | Ankara |
| 19:00 EEST | Umar 20', 44'; Çağıran 52' | Report | Yılmaz 31'; Sneijder 43' | Stadium: Osmanlı Stadyumu; Attendance: 6,238; Referee: Halis Özkahya |

| 6 February 2016 20 | Galatasaray | 0–0 | Konyaspor | Istanbul |
| 19:00 EEST | | Report | | Stadium: Türk Telekom Arena; Attendance: 16,698; Referee: Bülent Yıldırım |

| 13 February 2016 21 | Mersin İdman Yurdu | 2–1 | Galatasaray | Mersin |
| 19:00 EEST | Nakoulma 39'; Varol 63' | Report | Podolski 88' | Stadium: Mersin Arena; Attendance: 12,388; Referee: Yaşar Kemal Uğurlu |

| 21 February 2016 22 | Galatasaray | 2–1 | Trabzonspor | Istanbul |
| 19:00 EEST | Podolski 63'; İnan 89' (pen.) | Report | Zengin 25' (pen.) | Stadium: Türk Telekom Arena; Attendance: 22,208; Referee: Deniz Ateş Bitnel |

| 28 February 2016 23 | Gaziantepspor | 2–0 | Galatasaray | Gaziantep |
| 19:00 EEST | Nefiz 5'; Larsson 54' | Report | | Stadium: Kamil Ocak Stadium; Attendance: 7,254; Referee: Fırat Aydınus |

| 6 March 2016 24 | Galatasaray | 3–3 | İstanbul Başakşehir | Istanbul |
| 16:00 EEST | Öztekin 54', 71'; İnan 88' (pen.) | Report | Višća 5', 82'; Batdal 43' | Stadium: Türk Telekom Arena; Attendance: 13,985; Referee: Özgür Yankaya |

| 13 March 2016 25 | Gençlerbirliği | 1–1 | Galatasaray | Ankara |
| 16:00 EEST | Stancu 17' (pen.) | Report | İnan 61' (pen.) | Stadium: Ankara 19 Mayıs Stadium; Attendance: 5,418; Referee: Hüseyin Göçek |

| 13 April 2016 26 | Galatasaray | 0–0 | Fenerbahçe | Istanbul |
| 19:30 EEST | | Report | | Stadium: Türk Telekom Arena; Attendance: 37,748; Referee: Mete Kalkavan |

| 2 April 2016 27 | Eskişehirspor | 4–3 | Galatasaray | Eskişehir |
| 19:00 EEST | Bokila 41'; Ciftci 53'; Hadžić 58'; Kanak 68' | Report | Kısa 10'; Öztekin 49'; Kaya 90' | Stadium: Eskişehir Atatürk Stadium; Attendance: 3,961; Referee: Cüneyt Çakır |

| 9 April 2016 28 | Galatasaray | 1–1 | Çaykur Rizespor | Istanbul |
| 17:00 EEST | Çolak 98' | Report | Tuszyński 90' | Stadium: Türk Telekom Arena; Attendance: 8,524; Referee: Bülent Yıldırım |

| 16 April 2016 29 | Antalyaspor | 4–2 | Galatasaray | Antalya |
| 16:00 EEST | Eto'o 15', 53'; Başsan 72'; Şimşek 90' | Report | Diego Ângelo 39' (o.g.); Bulut 64' | Stadium: New Antalya Stadium; Attendance: 15,298; Referee: Yaşar Kemal Uğurlu |

| 24 April 2016 30 | Galatasaray | 4–1 | Kasımpaşa | Istanbul |
| 16:00 EEST | Kısa 13'; Podolski 62', 90'; İnan 70' | Report | Scarione 29' | Stadium: Türk Telekom Arena; Attendance: 6,348; Referee: Barış Şimşek |

| 29 April 2016 31 | Bursaspor | 1–1 | Galatasaray | Bursa |
| 20:00 EEST | Sivok 35' | Report | Adın 50' | Stadium: Bursa Atatürk Stadium; Attendance: 21,630; Referee: Fırat Aydınus |

| 8 May 2016 32 | Galatasaray | 0–1 | Beşiktaş | Istanbul |
| 20:00 EEST | | Report | Gómez 77' | Stadium: Türk Telekom Arena; Attendance: 26,189; Referee: Mete Kalkavan |

| 13 May 2016 33 | Akhisar Belediyespor | 1–2 | Galatasaray | Manisa |
| 19:00 EEST | Douglão 90' | Report | İnan 45' (pen.), 60' (pen.) | Stadium: Manisa 19 Mayıs Stadium; Attendance: 2,087; Referee: Suat Arslanboğa |

| 19 May 2016 34 | Galatasaray | 6–0 | Kayserispor | Istanbul |
| 20:00 EEST | Podolski 11'; Gümüş 26', 45', 69'; Kısa 58'; İnan 62' | Report | | Stadium: Türk Telekom Arena; Attendance: 5,577; Referee: Tolga Özkalfa |

=== Turkish Cup ===
| Pos | Team | Pld | W | D | L | GF | GA | GD | Pts |
|---|---|---|---|---|---|---|---|---|---|
| 1 | Galatasaray | 6 | 5 | 1 | 0 | 15 | 6 | +9 | 16 |
| 2 | Akhisar Belediyespor | 6 | 2 | 2 | 2 | 6 | 6 | 0 | 8 |
| 3 | Karşıyaka | 6 | 2 | 0 | 4 | 7 | 11 | −4 | 6 |
| 4 | Kastamonuspor 1966 | 6 | 1 | 1 | 4 | 6 | 11 | −5 | 4 |

| 17 December 2015 Group stage | Galatasaray | 2–1 | Akhisar Belediyespor | Istanbul |
| 20:00 EEST | Bulut 9'; Kısa 24' | Report | LuaLua 49' | Stadium: Türk Telekom Arena; Referee: Abdulkadir Bitigen |

| 23 December 2015 Group stage | Kastamonuspor | 1–2 | Galatasaray | Kastamonu |
| 13:45EEST | Özçelik 72' | Report | Çolak 5' (pen.); Bulut 61' | Stadium: Kastamonu Gazi Stadium; Referee: Ümit Öztürk |

| 9 January 2016 Group stage | Galatasaray | 3–1 | Karşıyaka | Istanbul |
| 19:30EEST | Gümüş 10'; Kısa 25'; Donk 44' | | Ünal 28' | Stadium: Türk Telekom Arena; Referee: Sarper Barış Saka |

| 12 January 2016 Group stage | Karşıyaka | 1–3 | Galatasaray | İzmir |
| 20:45EEST | Ateş 90+1' (pen.) | | Chedjou 84', 96'; Gümüş 88' | Stadium: İzmir Atatürk Stadium; Attendance: 7,000; Referee: Bülent Birincioğlu |

| 19 January 2016 Group stage | Akhisar Belediyespor | 1–1 | Galatasaray | Manisa |
| 19:45EEST | Özdemir 26' | | Bulut 39' | Stadium: Manisa 19 Mayıs Stadium; Referee: Serkan Tokat |

| 27 January 2016 Group stage | Galatasaray | 4–1 | Kastamonuspor | Istanbul |
| 20:15 EEST | Gümüş 10', 41', 45'; Karacan 55' | | Özçelik 72' | Stadium: Türk Telekom Arena; Referee: Mustafa Kürşad Filiz |

| 31 January 2016 Round of 16 | Galatasaray | 3–1 | Gaziantepspor | Istanbul |
| 20:15 EEST | Adın 20'; Gümüş 25'; Yılmaz 56' | | Habibou 75' | Stadium: Türk Telekom Arena; Attendance: 14,400; Referee: Süleyman Abay |

| 10 February 2016 Quarter-finals | Akhisar Belediyespor | 1–2 | Galatasaray | Manisa |
| 18:45 EEST | Rodallega 53' | Report | Douglão 70' (o.g.); İnan 72' | Stadium: Manisa 19 Mayıs Stadium; Referee: Mete Kalkavan |

| 2 March 2016 Quarter-finals | Galatasaray | 1–1 (3–2 agg.) | Akhisar Belediyespor | Istanbul |
| 18:15 EEST | Douglão 10' (o.g.) | Report | Rodallega 47' | Stadium: Türk Telekom Arena; Attendance: 6,000; Referee: Kutluhan Bilgiç |

| 20 April 2016 Semi-finals | Çaykur Rizespor | 1–3 | Galatasaray | Rize |
| 18:45 EEST | Özek 76' | Report | Çolak 15'; Öztekin 61'; Podolski 90' | Stadium: Yeni Rize Şehir Stadı; Attendance: 4,567; Referee: Ali Palabıyık |

| 4 May 2016 Semi-finals | Galatasaray | 0–0 (3–1 agg.) | Çaykur Rizespor | Istanbul |
| 20:45 EEST | | Report | | Stadium: Türk Telekom Arena; Attendance: 10,746; Referee: Volkan Bayarslan |

| 26 May 2016 Final | Galatasaray | 1–0 | Fenerbahçe | Antalya |
| 21:15 EEST | Podolski 30' | | | Stadium: Antalya Arena; Attendance: 32.539; Referee: Mete Kalkavan |

=== UEFA Champions League ===
==== Group stage ====
| Pos | Team | Pld | W | D | L | GF | GA | GD | Pts | Qualification | ATM | BEN | GAL | AST |
|---|---|---|---|---|---|---|---|---|---|---|---|---|---|---|
| 1 | (Spain) Atlético Madrid | 6 | 4 | 1 | 1 | 11 | 3 | +8 | 13 | Advance to knockout phase | — | 1–2 | 2–0 | 4–0 |
| 2 | (Portugal) Benfica | 6 | 3 | 1 | 2 | 10 | 8 | +2 | 10 | Advance to knockout phase | 1–2 | — | 2–1 | 2–0 |
| 3 | (Turkey) Galatasaray | 6 | 1 | 2 | 3 | 6 | 10 | −4 | 5 | Transfer to Europa League | 0–2 | 2–1 | — | 1–1 |
| 4 | (Kazakhstan) Astana | 6 | 0 | 4 | 2 | 5 | 11 | −6 | 4 | | 0–0 | 2–2 | 2–2 | — |

Source: UEFA
Rules for classification: Group stage tiebreakers

| 15 September 2015 1 | Galatasaray (Turkey) | 0–2 | (Spain) Atlético Madrid | Istanbul, Turkey |
| 20:45 CET | | Report | Griezmann 18', 25' | Stadium: Türk Telekom Arena; Attendance: 33,469; Referee: Szymon Marciniak (Poland) |

| 30 September 2015 2 | Astana (Kazakhstan) | 2–2 | (Turkey) Galatasaray | Astana, Kazakhstan |
| 18:00 CET | Balta 78' (o.g.); Cañas 88' | Report | Kısa 31'; Erić 86' (o.g.) | Stadium: Astana Arena; Attendance: 27,264; Referee: Martin Strömbergsson (Sweden) |

| 21 October 2015 3 | Galatasaray (Turkey) | 2–1 | (Portugal) Benfica | Istanbul, Turkey |
| 20:45 CET | İnan 19' (pen.); Podolski 33' | Report | Gaitán 2' | Stadium: Türk Telekom Arena; Attendance: 33,615; Referee: William Collum (Scotland) |

| 3 November 2015 4 | Benfica (Portugal) | 2–1 | (Turkey) Galatasaray | Lisbon, Portugal |
| 20:45 CET | Jonas 52'; Luisão 67' | Report | Podolski 58' | Stadium: Estádio da Luz; Attendance: 35,726; Referee: Milorad Mažić (Serbia) |

| 25 November 2015 5 | Atlético Madrid (Spain) | 2–0 | (Turkey) Galatasaray | Madrid, Spain |
| 20:45 CET | Griezmann 13', 65' | Report | | Stadium: Vicente Calderón; Attendance: 35,753; Referee: Nicola Rizzoli (Italy) |

| 8 December 2015 6 | Galatasaray (Turkey) | 1–1 | (Kazakhstan) Astana | Istanbul, Turkey |
| 20:45 CET | İnan 64' | Report | Twumasi 62' | Stadium: Türk Telekom Arena; Attendance: 26,464; Referee: Craig Thomson (Scotland) |

=== UEFA Europa League ===
==== Round of 32 ====
| 18 February 2016 First Leg | Galatasaray (Turkey) | 1–1 | (Italy) Lazio | Türk Telekom Arena, Istanbul |
| 21:05 CET | Sarıoğlu 12' | Report | Milinković-Savić 21' | Attendance: 33.340; Referee: Michael Oliver (England) |

| 25 February 2016 Second Leg | Lazio (Italy) | 3–1 (4–2 agg.) | (Turkey) Galatasaray | Stadio Olimpico, Rome |
| 19:00 | Parolo 21'; Felipe Anderson 61'; Klose 72' | Report | Öztekin 62' | Referee: Vladislav Bezborodov (Russia) |

== Statistics ==
=== Squad statistics ===
| No. | Pos. | Name | League | | Turkish Cup | | Super Cup | | Europe | | Total | | Discipline | | Minutes |
| No. | Pos. | Name | Apps | Goals | Apps | Goals | Apps | Goals | Apps | Goals | Apps | Goals | Yellow card | Red card | Total |
|---|---|---|---|---|---|---|---|---|---|---|---|---|---|---|---|
| 1 | GK | (Uruguay) Fernando Muslera | 33 | 0 | 6 | 0 | 1 | 0 | 8 | 0 | 48 | 0 | 5 | 0 | 4320 |
| 99 | GK | (Turkey) Cenk Gönen | 1 | 0 | 5 | 0 | 0 | 0 | 0 | 0 | 6 | 0 | 0 | 0 | 483 |
| 67 | GK | (Turkey) Eray İşcan | 0 | 0 | 2 | 0 | 0 | 0 | 0 | 0 | 2 | 0 | 0 | 0 | 147 |
| 13 | DF | (Brazil) ~~Alex Telles~~ | 2 | 0 | 0 | 0 | 1 | 0 | 0 | 0 | 3 | 0 | 0 | 0 | 270 |
| 23 | DF | (France) Lionel Carole | 19 | 0 | 9 | 0 | 0 | 0 | 5 | 0 | 33 | 0 | 7 | 1 | 2590 |
| 21 | DF | (Cameroon) Aurélien Chedjou | 19 | 1 | 5 | 2 | 1 | 0 | 6 | 0 | 31 | 3 | 6 | 0 | 2482 |
| 22 | DF | (Turkey) Hakan Balta | 27 | 1 | 8 | 0 | 1 | 0 | 8 | 0 | 44 | 1 | 8 | 1 | 3755 |
| 28 | DF | (Turkey) Koray Günter | 9 | 0 | 6 | 0 | 0 | 0 | 1 | 0 | 16 | 0 | 1 | 0 | 1120 |
| 64 | DF | (Belgium) Jason Denayer | 17 | 0 | 5 | 0 | 0 | 0 | 6 | 0 | 28 | 0 | 1 | 0 | 2152 |
| 26 | DF | (Turkey) Semih Kaya | 21 | 2 | 6 | 0 | 0 | 0 | 4 | 0 | 31 | 2 | 8 | 1 | 2508 |
| 38 | DF | (Turkey) Tarık Çamdal | 8 | 0 | 7 | 0 | 0 | 0 | 0 | 0 | 15 | 0 | 3 | 0 | 778 |
| 27 | DF | (Norway) Martin Linnes | 10 | 0 | 7 | 0 | 0 | 0 | 0 | 0 | 17 | 0 | 0 | 0 | 1120 |
| 15 | DF | (Netherlands) Ryan Donk | 14 | 0 | 6 | 1 | 0 | 0 | 2 | 0 | 22 | 1 | 6 | 1 | 1488 |
| 55 | DF | (Turkey) Sabri Sarıoğlu | 27 | 0 | 7 | 0 | 1 | 0 | 8 | 0 | 43 | 0 | 7 | 0 | 2967 |
| 4 | MF | (Turkey) Hamit Altıntop | 0 | 0 | 0 | 0 | 0 | 0 | 0 | 0 | 0 | 0 | 0 | 0 | 0 |
| 5 | MF | (Turkey) Bilal Kısa | 22 | 5 | 8 | 2 | 1 | 0 | 5 | 1 | 36 | 8 | 3 | 0 | 2207 |
| 8 | MF | (Turkey) Selçuk İnan | 28 | 10 | 7 | 1 | 1 | 0 | 7 | 2 | 43 | 13 | 12 | 1 | 3677 |
| 3 | MF | (Brazil) ~~Felipe Melo~~ | 2 | 0 | 0 | 0 | 0 | 0 | 0 | 0 | 2 | 0 | 0 | 0 | 122 |
| 6 | MF | (Turkey) ~~Jem Karacan~~ | 2 | 0 | 4 | 1 | 1 | 0 | 1 | 0 | 8 | 1 | 2 | 0 | 452 |
| 14 | MF | (Spain) José Rodríguez | 14 | 0 | 6 | 0 | 0 | 0 | 3 | 0 | 23 | 0 | 3 | 0 | 1282 |
| 52 | MF | (Turkey) Emre Çolak | 18 | 1 | 9 | 2 | 1 | 0 | 2 | 0 | 30 | 3 | 1 | 1 | 1881 |
| 29 | MF | (Turkey) Olcan Adın | 27 | 3 | 10 | 1 | 0 | 0 | 6 | 0 | 44 | 4 | 7 | 0 | 2834 |
| 7 | MF | (Turkey) Yasin Öztekin | 30 | 7 | 10 | 1 | 1 | 1 | 8 | 1 | 49 | 10 | 11 | 0 | 3570 |
| 18 | MF | (Turkey) Sinan Gümüş | 15 | 5 | 7 | 6 | 0 | 0 | 3 | 0 | 25 | 11 | 3 | 0 | 1142 |
| 10 | MF | (Netherlands) Wesley Sneijder | 25 | 5 | 6 | 0 | 1 | 0 | 8 | 0 | 40 | 5 | 11 | 0 | 3200 |
| 11 | FW | (Germany) Lukas Podolski | 30 | 13 | 4 | 2 | 1 | 0 | 8 | 2 | 42 | 17 | 8 | 0 | 3670 |
| 17 | FW | (Turkey) ~~Burak Yılmaz~~ | 15 | 9 | 1 | 1 | 1 | 0 | 4 | 0 | 21 | 10 | 5 | 0 | 1467 |
| 9 | FW | (Turkey) Umut Bulut | 27 | 4 | 10 | 3 | 1 | 0 | 8 | 0 | 46 | 7 | 2 | 1 | 2669 |
| – | – | Own goals | – | 1 | – | 2 | – | 0 | – | 1 | – | 4 | – | – | – |

Statistics accurate as of 27 May 2016.

=== Goals ===
Includes all competitive matches. In the case of a tie in total number of goals, players with more goals in Europe are ranked higher, followed by Süper Lig, Super Cup and Turkish Cup goals respectively. If all stats are the same, then the younger player is ranked higher.

Last updated on 27 May 2016

| Position | Nation | Number | Name | Süper Lig | Europe | Turkish Cup | Super Cup | Total |
|---|---|---|---|---|---|---|---|---|
| 1 | (Germany) | 11 | Lukas Podolski | 13 | 2 | 2 | 0 | 17 |
| 2 | (Turkey) | 8 | Selçuk İnan | 11 | 2 | 1 | 0 | 14 |
| 3 | (Turkey) | 18 | Sinan Gümüş | 5 | 0 | 6 | 0 | 11 |
| 4 | (Turkey) | 17 | Burak Yılmaz | 9 | 0 | 1 | 0 | 10 |
| 4 | (Turkey) | 7 | Yasin Öztekin | 7 | 1 | 1 | 1 | 10 |
| 5 | (Turkey) | 9 | Umut Bulut | 4 | 0 | 3 | 0 | 7 |
| 5 | (Turkey) | 5 | Bilal Kısa | 4 | 1 | 2 | 0 | 7 |
| 5 | (Netherlands) | 10 | Wesley Sneijder | 5 | 0 | 0 | 0 | 5 |
| 6 | (Turkey) | 29 | Olcan Adın | 3 | 0 | 1 | 0 | 4 |
| 7 | (Cameroon) | 21 | Aurélien Chedjou | 1 | 0 | 2 | 0 | 3 |
| 7 | (Turkey) | 52 | Emre Çolak | 2 | 0 | 1 | 0 | 3 |
| 8 | (Turkey) | 26 | Semih Kaya | 2 | 0 | 0 | 0 | 2 |
| 9 | (Turkey) | 22 | Hakan Balta | 1 | 0 | 0 | 0 | 1 |
| 9 | (Netherlands) | 15 | Ryan Donk | 0 | 0 | 1 | 0 | 1 |
| 9 | (Turkey) | 6 | Jem Karacan | 0 | 0 | 1 | 0 | 1 |
| 9 | (Turkey) | 55 | Sabri Sarıoğlu | 0 | 1 | 0 | 0 | 1 |
| 10 | | | Own Goals | 2 | 1 | 2 | 0 | 5 |
| | | | TOTAL | 69 | 8 | 25 | 1 | 103 |

=== Assists ===
Last updated on 26 May 2016.

| Position | Nation | Number | Name | Total |
|---|---|---|---|---|
| 1 | (Netherlands) | 10 | Wesley Sneijder | 10 |
| 1 | (Germany) | 11 | Lukas Podolski | 10 |
| 2 | (Turkey) | 7 | Yasin Öztekin | 9 |
| 3 | (Turkey) | 55 | Sabri Sarıoğlu | 7 |
| 4 | (Turkey) | 5 | Bilal Kısa | 5 |
| 4 | (Turkey) | 8 | Selçuk İnan | 5 |
| 5 | (Turkey) | 18 | Sinan Gümüş | 4 |
| 5 | (Turkey) | 29 | Olcan Adın | 4 |
| 5 | (Turkey) | 9 | Umut Bulut | 4 |
| 6 | (Cameroon) | 21 | Aurélien Chedjou | 3 |
| 6 | (Netherlands) | 15 | Ryan Donk | 3 |
| 6 | (Turkey) | 52 | Emre Çolak | 3 |
| 6 | (Belgium) | 64 | Jason Denayer | 3 |
| 7 | (Turkey) | 22 | Hakan Balta | 2 |
| 7 | (Spain) | 14 | José Rodríguez | 2 |
| 7 | (Norway) | 27 | Martin Linnes | 2 |
| 8 | (Brazil) | 13 | Alex Telles | 1 |
| 8 | (Turkey) | 17 | Burak Yılmaz | 1 |
| 8 | (France) | 23 | Lionel Carole | 1 |

=== Disciplinary record ===
| N | Pos. | Nat. | Name | Yellow card | Second yellow card | Red card | Notes |
|---|---|---|---|---|---|---|---|
| 1 | GK | (Uruguay) | Fernando Muslera | 5 | | | |
| 99 | GK | (Turkey) | Cenk Gönen | | | | |
| 67 | GK | (Turkey) | Eray İşcan | | | | |
| 21 | DF | (Cameroon) | Aurélien Chedjou | 6 | | | |
| 28 | DF | (Turkey) | Koray Günter | 1 | | | |
| 64 | DF | (Belgium) | Jason Denayer | 1 | | | |
| 22 | DF | (Turkey) | Hakan Balta | 8 | | 1 | |
| 15 | DF | (Brazil) | ~~Alex Telles~~ | | | | |
| 27 | DF | (Norway) | Martin Linnes | | | | |
| 23 | DF | (France) | Lionel Carole | 7 | 1 | | |
| 38 | DF | (Turkey) | Tarık Çamdal | 6 | | | |
| 26 | DF | (Turkey) | Semih Kaya | 8 | 1 | | |
| 55 | DF | (Turkey) | Sabri Sarıoğlu | 7 | | | |
| 15 | DF | (Netherlands) | Ryan Donk | 6 | | 1 | |
| 6 | MF | (Turkey) | ~~Jem Karacan~~ | 2 | | | |
| 5 | MF | (Turkey) | Bilal Kısa | 3 | | | |
| 14 | MF | (Spain) | José Rodríguez | 4 | | | |
| 4 | MF | (Turkey) | Hamit Altıntop | | | | |
| 8 | MF | (Turkey) | Selçuk İnan | 12 | | 1 | |
| 3 | MF | (Brazil) | ~~Felipe Melo~~ | | | | |
| 10 | MF | (Netherlands) | Wesley Sneijder | 11 | | | |
| 18 | MF | (Turkey) | Sinan Gümüş | 3 | | | |
| 52 | MF | (Turkey) | Emre Çolak | 1 | | 1 | |
| 29 | MF | (Turkey) | Olcan Adın | 7 | | | |
| 7 | MF | (Turkey) | Yasin Öztekin | 11 | | | |
| 11 | MF | (Germany) | Lukas Podolski | 7 | | | |
| 9 | FW | (Turkey) | Umut Bulut | 3 | 1 | | |
| 17 | FW | (Turkey) | ~~Burak Yılmaz~~ | 5 | | | |

Last updated: 26 May 2016
Source: http://www.ntvspor.net/istatistik
Only competitive matches
(yellow card) = Number of bookings; (second yellow card) = Number of sending offs after a second yellow card; (red card) = Number of sending offs by a direct red card.

=== Overall ===
| | Total | Home | Away | Neutral |
|---|---|---|---|---|
| Games played | 55 | 27 | 26 | 2 |
| Games won | 24 | 14 | 8 | 2 |
| Games drawn | 18 | 10 | 8 | - |
| Games lost | 13 | 3 | 10 | - |
| Biggest win | 6-0 vs Kayserispor | 6-0 vs Kayserispor | 4-1 vs Konyaspor | 1-0 vs Bursaspor & 1-0 vs Fenerbahçe |
| Biggest loss | 0-2 vs Atlético Madrid | 0-2 vs Atlético Madrid | 3-4 vs Rizespor | - |
| Biggest win (League) | 6-0 vs Kayserispor | 6-0 vs Kayserispor | 4-1 vs Konyaspor | - |
| Biggest win (Cup) | 4-1 vs Kastamonuspor | 4-1 vs Kastamonuspor | 3-1 vs Karşıyaka & 3-1 vs Çaykur Rizespor | - |
| Biggest win (UEFA) | 2-1 vs Benfica | 2-1 vs Benfica | - | - |
| Biggest win (Super Cup) | 1-0 vs Bursaspor | - | - | 1-0 vs Bursaspor |
| Biggest loss (League) | 3-4 vs Rizespor | 1-2 vs Osmanlıspor | 3-4 vs Rizespor | - |
| Biggest loss (Cup) | - | - | - | - |
| Biggest loss (UEFA) | 1-3 vs Lazio | 0-2 vs Atlético Madrid | 1-3 vs Lazio | - |
| Biggest loss (Super Cup) | - | - | - | - |
| Clean sheets | 10 | 5 | 3 | 2 |
| Goals scored | 103 | 57 | 44 | 2 |
| Goals conceded | 73 | 28 | 45 | 0 |
| Goal difference | +30 | +29 | -1 | +2 |
| Average GF per game | 1.87 | 2.11 | 1.69 | 1 |
| Average GA per game | 1.33 | 1.04 | 1.73 | 0 |
| Yellow cards | 121 | – | | |
| Red cards | 7 | – | | |
| Most appearances | Yasin Öztekin (49) | – | | |
| Most minutes played | Fernando Muslera (4320) | – | | |
| Most goals | Lukas Podolski (17) | – | | |
| Most assists | Wesley Sneijder (9) | – | | |
| Points | 90 | 50 | 29 | 6 |
| Winning rate | 43.64% | 51.85% | 30.77% | 100% |

=== Attendance ===
| Competition | Total. Att. | Avg. Att. |
|---|---|---|
| Süper Lig | 322,929 | 18,996 |
| Turkish Cup | 51,646 | 8,608 |
| Europe | 126,888 | 31,722 |
| Total | 501,463 | 18,573 |

- Sold season tickets: 32,070 & 197 suites = 34,237

== See also ==
- 2015–16 Süper Lig
- 2015–16 Turkish Cup
- 2015 Turkish Super Cup
- 2015–16 UEFA Champions League
