= Jason Denayer =

Belgian footballer (born 1995)

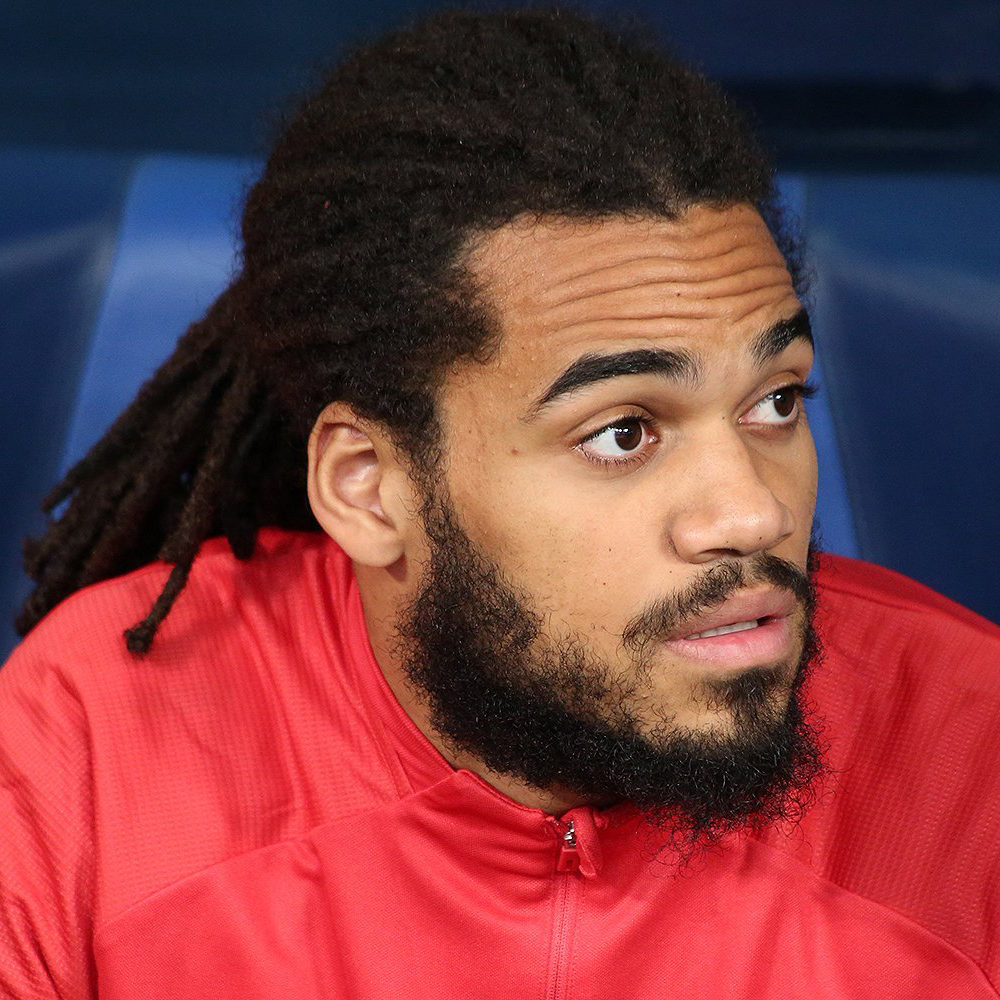
- Denayer with Belgium in 2019

Personal information
- Full name: Jason Grégory Denayer
- Date of birth: 28 June 1995 (age 31)
- Place of birth: Jette, Belgium
- Height: 1.78 m (5 ft 10 in)
- Position: Centre-back

Youth career
- 2003–2006: FC Ganshoren
- 2006–2008: Anderlecht
- 2008–2013: JMG Academy
- 2013–2014: Manchester City

Senior career*
Years	Team	Apps	(Gls)
2014–2018	Manchester City	0	(0)
2014–2015	→ Celtic (loan)	29	(5)
2015–2016	→ Galatasaray (loan)	17	(0)
2016–2017	→ Sunderland (loan)	24	(0)
2017–2018	→ Galatasaray (loan)	22	(0)
2018–2022	Lyon	102	(6)
2022–2023	Shabab Al Ahli	9	(0)
2023–2025	Al Fateh	21	(1)

International career
2013–2014	Belgium U19	9	(0)
2014–2016	Belgium U21	3	(1)
2015–2022	Belgium	35	(1)
- * Club domestic league appearances and goals as of 27 May 2024

Jason Grégory Denayer (born 28 June 1995) is a Belgian professional footballer who last played as a centre-back for Saudi Pro League club Al Fateh.

Denayer made his professional debut while on loan at Celtic, being named the PFA Scotland Young Player of the Year after helping them win the Scottish Premiership and Scottish League Cup. He then spent the following season on loan at Galatasaray, helping them win the Turkish Cup.

He played several times for Belgium at Under-19 and Under-21 levels, before making his full senior debut in March 2015. He was named in Belgium's 23-man squad for UEFA Euro 2016 and made one appearance, playing in their quarter-final tie against Wales. He also featured at UEFA Euro 2020 and in the 2021 UEFA Nations League Finals where he took fourth place.

== Early life ==
Denayer was born in Jette, Brussels, Belgium, to a Congolese mother and Belgian father.

== Club career ==
=== Early career ===
Denayer started playing football at age six, where he started out at FC Ganshoren and then Anderlecht. At the age of 13, he joined the JMG Academy in Lier. It was there he was converted from playing as a striker to becoming a defender. Denayer credits his time at JMG for honing his football technique. Youths at the academy do not play normal competition football, instead taking part in small-sided games among each other, focusing on technique and education in a private school. They trained in bare feet to improve their touch; "It helps to develop your technical skills. Once you've reached a certain level, you're allowed to put on shoes. From then on the training is focused on technique and playing in small spaces" explained Denayer. He described the regime as "tough", adding "Your day started at 7 am and ended at 10:30 pm. In between you had 90 minutes – just before bedtime – to call your friends or family. It was playing football, studying, eat, sleep".

In 2013, Lierse, who are in partnership with the JMG Academy, attempted to sign Denayer. However, he rejected their offer and instead moved abroad to England to try and find a club. He had a trial at Liverpool, but club and player failed to reach an agreement. He then went for a trial at Manchester City.

=== Manchester City ===
In July 2013 Denayer joined the Manchester City academy. In the summer transfer window, Denayer signed his first professional contract at Manchester City after a successful trial. Denayer was ever present for the club's campaign in the UEFA Youth League, where he made eight appearances, scoring once in a 6–0 win over Bayern Munich. Denayer also played a huge role in domestic competitions where he helped the club finish fourth in the Professional U21 Development League, as well as reaching the final of the U21 Premier League Cup.

In pre-season during July 2014, Denayer was included in the first team and started in a 2–0 friendly loss away against Dundee.

On 10 July 2015, it was confirmed that he would be in the club's squad for their pre-season tour in Australia. Denayer signed a new five-year deal on 13 July 2015.

==== Loan to Celtic ====
On 12 August 2014, Celtic signed Denayer on a season-long loan from Manchester City, making him one of Ronny Deila's first major signings as Celtic manager. Denayer revealed that Vincent Kompany and Patrick Vieira played a vital role for him in joining the club.

He scored on his debut and was named man of the match in a 6–1 victory at home to Dundee United in the Scottish Premiership. Four days later, on 20 August 2014, Denayer made his Champions League debut, in a 1–1 draw against Maribor, where he was part of the starting line-up. His second goal came in a 2–1 win over Aberdeen on 13 September 2014. The defender scored again for Celtic on 18 October 2014, in a 5–0 win over Ross County. By the end of December, Denayer had made 17 appearances for Celtic and formed a solid partnership with Virgil van Dijk in central defence. Denayer commented about playing alongside Van Dijk: "We play well together and he is a very good player", adding "I am also learning from him as well. He has more experience than me and he knows what to say to me. I listen to him because I know he can help make me a better player."

Just months after arriving at Celtic, reports claimed that Celtic were keen to extend Denayer's loan spell by another year. However, Denayer immediately ruled out joining Celtic on a permanent basis, insisting that he hoped to earn a first team place at Manchester City in the near future. Manchester City kept an eye on Denayer's progress at Celtic, with Development Side coach Patrick Vieira stating "When I watch Jason playing for Celtic, or Marcos Lopes playing at Lille, it makes us really proud. The way they are performing lets me know we are doing things the right stuff [sic]", and adding "The object is to provide players for the first team, but we know the gap is massive from under-21 to the first team – but this is one way we can get them there."

Denayer won his first major trophy on 15 March 2015 when he played in Celtic's 2–0 win over Dundee United in the League Cup Final at Hampden Park. He was described as being "strong in the tackle" and "comfortable with the ball". Denayer himself stated that "It is the first cup final and first win of my career, so it was a very special day for me." He also praised Celtic manager Ronny Deila: "He has been a very good coach for me", adding "I think I have improved and got better at Celtic. He [Deila] has trusted me to play and I have learned so much from that."

On 2 May, Celtic were confirmed as Premiership champions when Dundee United defeated nearest competitors Aberdeen. The next day, Denayer was voted the PFA Scotland Young Player of the Year, with his teammate Stefan Johansen taking the overall prize. After winning the prize, he said when asked if he would remain at Celtic: "I don't know. I need to wait until summer and see what is going to happen... When I came here I just wanted to play some games and take some experience, but now I win trophies and personal trophies so it has gone better than I expected".

==== Loan to Galatasaray ====
In August 2015, Galatasaray signed Denayer on a season-long loan from Manchester City. Denayer played his first game for Galatasaray on 15 September 2015, in a UEFA Champions League tie against Atlético Madrid. Despite a 2–0 defeat, the Belgium defender turned in an impressive performance. He then made his league debut on 19 September in match away against Trabzonspor, playing on the right side of defence, helping his new side keep a clean sheet in a 1–0 victory. Denayer continued to display his natural attributes of pace and power, whilst also improving his reading of the game. Two assists for goals against Eskişehirspor and Gaziantepspor also highlighted his ability to contribute to the attacking side of the game.

His last match for Galatasaray was in the Turkish Cup Final against Fenerbahçe on 26 May 2016. Denayer provided the assist for the only goal of the game on 30 minutes; a flick on from Emre Colak's corner on to Lukas Podolski who headed in from close range.

==== Loan to Sunderland ====
On 31 August 2016, Denayer joined Premier League side Sunderland on a season-long loan deal. However, Sunderland were poor and ended up being relegated. Denayer struggled to perform consistently and was often fielded in midfield instead of his natural position as a defender. He was also hindered by a series of niggling injuries towards the end of the season.

==== Second loan to Galatasaray ====
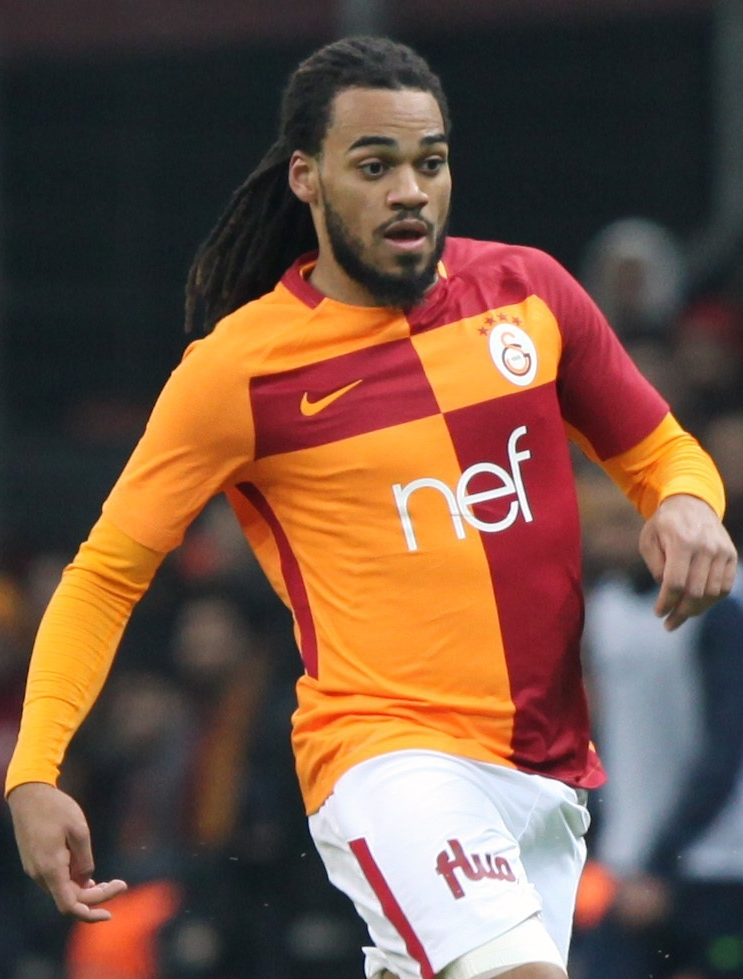
Denayer in 2018.

On 31 August 2017, Denayer re-signed for Galatasaray on a season-long loan deal. In a 2–0 win over Osmanlıspor on 28 January 2018, Denayer completed 60 successful passes, overtaking the previous pass completion record in Süper Lig set by Atiba Hutchinson of Beşiktaş in season 2014–15.

He played 22 games during his second spell at the club to help Galatasaray win the 2017–18 Süper Lig.

=== Lyon ===
On 21 August 2018, Denayer joined Ligue 1 club Lyon for €6.5m, signing a four-year contract. Denayer was a regular for the team, having 31 starts in the 2018–19 season and scoring two goals. He faced his former employers, Manchester City, in the Champions League quarter-finals on 15 August 2020, as Lyon won 3–1.

=== Shabab Al Ahli ===
After his contract with Lyon expired on July 1, Denayer was a free agent. He was signed by Emirati club Shabab Al Ahli in late September 2022.

=== Al Fateh ===
On 23 July 2023, Denayer joined Saudi Professional League club Al Fateh on a two-year deal.

On 31 January 2025, Denayer left Al Fateh on mutual agreement and is currently a free agent.

== International career ==
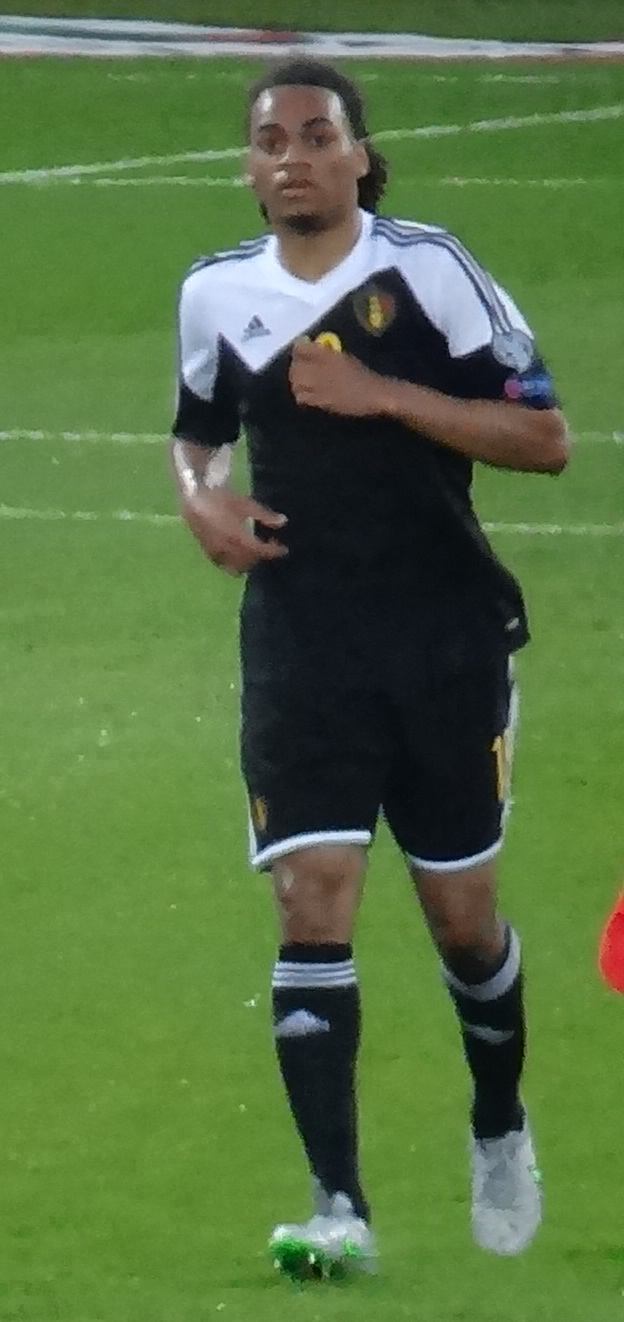
Denayer playing for Belgium in 2015

From 2013 on, Denayer represented Belgium at different levels, such as Belgium U19 and Belgium U21.

On 2 October 2014, national team manager Marc Wilmots called him for the first time to the Belgium national team for their Euro 2016 qualification match against Andorra. Denayer was included in further international squads for Euro qualifier matches against Bosnia and Wales and for a friendly against Iceland. However, he was an unused substitute in each of these four games.

Denayer made his senior international debut for Belgium on 31 March 2015 in a UEFA Euro 2016 qualifier away to Israel at the Teddy Stadium in Jerusalem. He replaced Aston Villa striker Christian Benteke in the 67th minute of a 1–0 win which put Belgium at the top of the group. Denayer made his first start for the senior side on 7 June 2015, in a friendly match against France in Paris which Belgium won 4–3. Manager Marc Wilmots substituted Denayer late on in the match for a minor knock sustained, and pointed out that it was after this that France scored twice to pull the game back to 4–3.

He was named in Belgium's 23-man squad for the 2016 European Championships. Denayer only played once, coming in to an injury depleted Belgian defence for their quarter-final tie against Wales. Belgium, and Denayer in particular, were run ragged by Wales and lost 3–1.

On 17 May 2021, Denayer was included in the final 26-man squad for the re-arranged UEFA Euro 2020.

== Career statistics ==
=== Club ===
As of match played 22 January 2025

Appearances and goals by club, season and competition
Club	Season	League			National cup (Note: Includes Scottish Cup, Turkish Cup, FA Cup, Coupe de France)		League cup (Note: Includes Scottish League Cup, EFL Cup, Coupe de la Ligue)		Europe		Total	
Club	Season	Division	Apps	Goals	Apps	Goals	Apps	Goals	Apps	Goals	Apps	Goals
Manchester City	2013–14	Premier League	0	0	0	0	0	0	0	0	0	0
Celtic (loan)	2014–15	Scottish Premiership	29	5	4	1	4	0	7 (Note: One appearance in UEFA Champions League, six appearances in UEFA Europa League)	0	44	6
Galatasaray (loan)	2015–16	Süper Lig	17	0	5	0	—		6 (Note: Four appearances in UEFA Champions League, two appearances in UEFA Europa League)	0	28	0
Sunderland (loan)	2016–17	Premier League	24	0	2	0	1	0	—		27	0
Galatasaray (loan)	2017–18	Süper Lig	22	0	0	0	—		0	0	22	0
Lyon	2018–19	Ligue 1	31	2	4	1	2	0	8 (Note: Appearances in UEFA Champions League)	0	45	3
Lyon	2019–20	Ligue 1	25	0	4	0	3	0	9	0	41	0
Lyon	2020–21	Ligue 1	31	1	2	1	—		—		33	2
Lyon	2021–22	Ligue 1	15	3	0	0	—		5 (Note: Appearances in UEFA Europa League)	0	20	3
Lyon	Total		102	6	10	2	5	0	22	0	139	8
Shabab Al Ahli	2022–23	UAE Pro League	9	0	0	0	2	0	0	0	11	0
Al Fateh	2023–24	Saudi Pro League	21	1	1	0	—		—		22	1
Al Fateh	2024–25	Saudi Pro League	15	0	1	0	—		—		16	0
Al Fateh	Total		36	1	2	0	—		—		38	1
Career total			239	12	23	3	12	0	35	0	309	15

=== International ===
As of match played 29 March 2022

National team	Year	Apps	Goals
Belgium	2015	4	0
Belgium	2016	4	0
Belgium	2017	0	0
Belgium	2018	2	0
Belgium	2019	3	0
Belgium	2020	7	1
Belgium	2021	13	0
Belgium	2022	2	0
Total		35	1

Belgium score listed first, score column indicates score after each Denayer goal.

International goals by date, venue, cap, opponent, score, result and competition
No.	Date	Venue	Cap	Opponent	Score	Result	Competition
1	5 September 2020	Parken Stadium, Copenhagen, Denmark	15	Denmark	1–0	2–0	2020–21 UEFA Nations League A

== Honours ==
Celtic

- Scottish Premiership: 2014–15
- Scottish League Cup: 2014–15

Galatasaray

- Süper Lig: 2017–18
- Turkish Cup: 2015–16

Lyon

- Coupe de la Ligue runner-up: 2019–20

Individual

- Scottish Professional Football League Young Player of the Month: March 2015
- PFA Scotland Young Player of the Year: 2014–15
- PFA Scotland Team of the Year: 2014–15
- Celtic Young Player of the Year: 2014–15
