= Martin Linnes =

Norwegian footballer (born 1991)

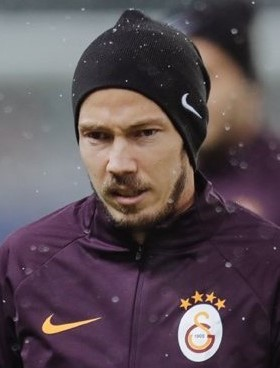
- Linnes training with Galatasaray

Personal information
- Date of birth: 20 September 1991 (age 35)
- Place of birth: Sander, Norway
- Height: 1.77 m (5 ft 10 in)
- Position: Right-back

Team information
- Current team: Molde
- Number: 25

Youth career
- Sander
- Kongsvinger

Senior career*
Years	Team	Apps	(Gls)
2010–2011	Kongsvinger	41	(1)
2012–2016	Molde	104	(11)
2016–2021	Galatasaray	101	(2)
2021–	Molde	94	(10)

International career^{‡}
2011–2013	Norway U21	7	(0)
2013–2021	Norway	29	(1)
Medal record
Molde
Winner	Tippeligaen	2012
Winner	Tippeligaen	2014
Winner	Tippeligaen	2022
Winner	Norwegian Football Cup	2013
Winner	Norwegian Football Cup	2014
Winner	Norwegian Football Cup	2021–22
Winner	Norwegian Football Cup	2023
Winner	Turkish Cup	2016
Winner	Turkish Cup	2019
Winner	Turkish Super Cup	2016
Winner	Süper Lig	2018
Winner	Süper Lig	2019
- * Club domestic league appearances and goals as of 1 December 2025 ‡ National team caps and goals as of 30 March 2021

Martin Linnes (born 20 September 1991) is a Norwegian professional footballer who plays as a right-back for Norwegian club Molde.

== Club career ==
=== Early years ===
Linnes started his career at Sander, then joined Kongsvinger. In 2010, he made his debut in the Norwegian top division.

=== Molde ===
Linnes joined Molde in 2012, after his contract with Kongsvinger had expired. On 9 April 2012, he made his first assist against Brann, which Molde won 2–1, and on 4 August 2012, scored his first goal against Sogndal, in a match which Molde won 2–1. On 17 September 2015, Linnes scored the third goal against Fenerbahçe in the 2015–16 UEFA Europa League group stage, 3–1 away win.

After four years for Molde, Linnes agreed with Galatasaray. In his Molde years, he played 152 games, scoring 14 goals and making 26 assists.

=== Galatasaray ===
In January 2016, Linnes signed a 3 1/2-year contract with Turkish club Galatasaray for a €2 million transfer fee. He picked number 27 for his shirt from its previous owner, Emmanuel Eboué. He made his debut for Cim-Bom against Akhisar Belediyespor in the 2015–16 Turkish Cup, which ended in a 1–1 draw.

On 26 January 2016, Linnes started as central midfielder with José Rodríguez against Kastamonuspor in 2015–16 Turkish Cup, and made an assist to Sinan Gümüş, who scored the third goal. In the second half, he returned to his main position at right-back, after Tarık Çamdal had been taken from the pitch. Galatasaray won that match 4–1 at home.

On 6 February 2016, he played his first Süper Lig match, a 0–0 draw at home against Konyaspor, playing the full 90 minutes right-back.

On 11 April 2019, Galatasaray extended his contract for two more seasons, until the end of 2020–21 season.

=== Return to Molde ===
On 17 August 2021, Molde announced that they signed their former right-back Martin Linnes.

== Style of play ==
A versatile player, he also played as a left-back, central midfielder, right midfielder and right winger.

== Career statistics ==
=== Club ===
As of 12 July 2025

Appearances and goals by club, season and competition
Club	Season	Division	League		National Cup (Note: Includes Norwegian Cup, Turkish Cup)		Europe		Other		Total	
Club	Season	Division	Apps	Goals	Apps	Goals	Apps	Goals	Apps	Goals	Apps	Goals
Kongsvinger	2010	Tippeligaen	15	0	3	0	—		—		18	0
Kongsvinger	2011	1. divisjon	26	1	3	0	—		—		29	1
Kongsvinger	Total		41	1	6	0	—		—		47	1
Molde	2012	Tippeligaen	24	1	3	0	11 (Note: Four appearances in UEFA Champions League, seven appearances in UEFA Europa League)	0	—		35	1
Molde	2013	Tippeligaen	24	4	6	1	5 (Note: Four appearances and one goal in UEFA Champions League, one appearance in UEFA Europa League)	1	—		34	6
Molde	2014	Tippeligaen	28	4	6	0	4 (Note: Appearances in UEFA Europa League)	0	—		38	4
Molde	2015	Tippeligaen	28	2	2	0	11 (Note: Three appearances in UEFA Champions League, eight appearances and one goal in UEFA Europa League)	1	—		41	3
Molde	Total		104	11	17	1	27	2	0	0	148	14
Galatasaray	2015–16	Süper Lig	10	0	7	0	—		—		17	0
Galatasaray	2016–17	Süper Lig	18	0	7	1	—		1 (Note: Appearance in Turkish Super Cup)	0	26	1
Galatasaray	2017–18	Süper Lig	20	0	6	0	2	0	—		28	0
Galatasaray	2018–19	Süper Lig	19	2	7	2	6 (Note: Five appearances in UEFA Champions League, one appearance in UEFA Europa League)	0	1	0	33	4
Galatasaray	2019–20	Süper Lig	12	0	4	0	—		—		16	0
Galatasaray	2020–21	Süper Lig	22	0	1	0	3	0	—		26	0
Galatasaray	Total		101	2	32	3	11	0	2	0	146	5
Molde	2021	Eliteserien	11	0	0	0	0	0	—		11	0
Molde	2022	Eliteserien	23	4	5	2	10 (Note: Appearances in UEFA Europa Conference League)	1	—		38	7
Molde	2023	Eliteserien	21	5	6	0	5 (Note: Four appearances and one goal in UEFA Champions League, one appearance in UEFA Europa League)	1	—		32	6
Molde	2024	Eliteserien	20	1	2	0	10	1	—		32	2
Molde	2025	Eliteserien	8	0	3	0	0	0	—		11	0
Molde	Total		83	10	16	2	25	3	—		118	14
Career total			329	23	71	6	63	5	2	0	465	35

=== International ===
As of 30 March 2021

Appearances and goals by national team and year
National team	Year	Apps	Goals
Norway	2013	2	0
Norway	2014	8	0
Norway	2015	2	0
Norway	2016	3	0
Norway	2017	5	1
Norway	2018	3	0
Norway	2019	0	0
Norway	2020	4	0
Norway	2021	2	0
Total		29	1

Scores and results list Norway's goal tally first, score column indicates score after each Linnes goal.

List of international goals scored by Martin Linnes
No.	Date	Venue	Opponent	Score	Result	Competition
1	5 October 2017	San Marino Stadium, Serravalle, San Marino	San Marino	8–0	8–0	2018 FIFA World Cup qualification

== Honours ==
Molde

- Tippeligaen/Eliteserien: 2012, 2014, 2022
- Norwegian Cup: 2013, 2014, 2021–22, 2023

Galatasaray

- Süper Lig: 2017–18, 2018–19
- Türkiye Kupası: 2015–16, 2018–19
- Süper Kupa: 2016, 2019

Norway U21

- UEFA European Under-21 Championship bronze: 2013
- Eliteserien Defender of the Year: 2014
