= Ryan Donk =

Dutch footballer (born 1986)

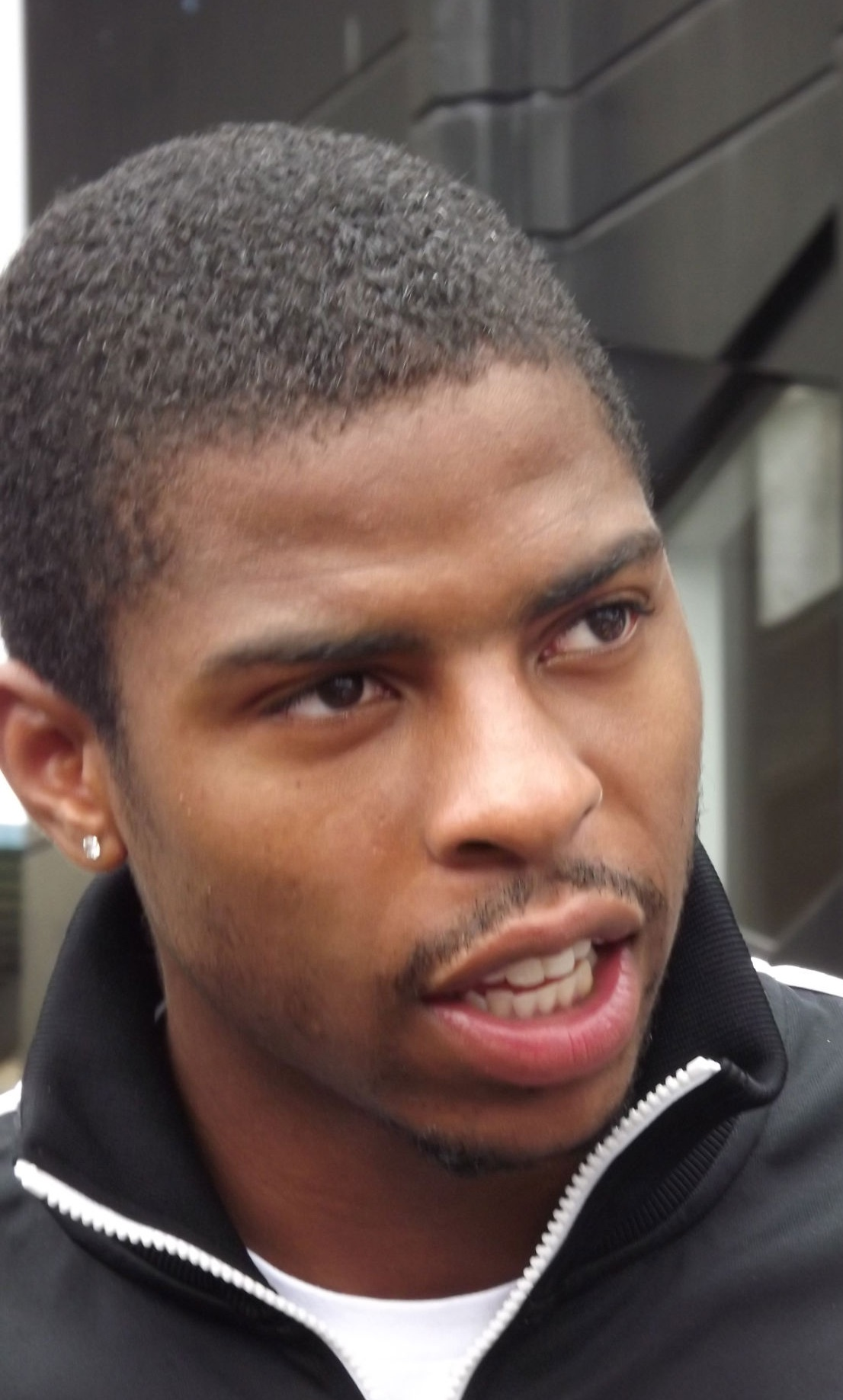
- Donk in 2012

Personal information
- Full name: Ryan Henk Donk
- Date of birth: 30 March 1986 (age 40)
- Place of birth: Amsterdam, Netherlands
- Height: 1.92 m (6 ft 4 in)
- Position: Centre-back

Youth career
- 1992–1999: Neerlandia
- 1999–2005: Zeeburgia

Senior career*
Years	Team	Apps	(Gls)
2005–2006	RKC	9	(0)
2006–2009	AZ	44	(1)
2008–2009	→ West Bromwich Albion (loan)	16	(0)
2009–2013	Club Brugge	130	(10)
2013–2016	Kasımpaşa	75	(11)
2016–2021	Galatasaray	111	(7)
2016–2017	→ Betis (loan)	16	(0)
2021–2023	Kasımpaşa	48	(3)
Total		449	(32)

International career
2006–2008	Netherlands U21	16	(0)
2021–2022	Suriname	12	(1)
Medal record
Men's football
Representing Netherlands
UEFA European Under-21 Championship
Winner	2007
- * Club domestic league appearances and goals

Ryan Henk Donk (born 30 March 1986) is a retired footballer who played as a centre-back. Born in the Netherlands, he played for the Suriname national team.

== Club career ==
=== RKC and AZ ===
Donk impressed in the 2005–06 season at RKC Waalwijk and with an expiring contract, he wanted to make a step up to a higher level. AZ first approached him, but other clubs including Ajax, PSV and Barcelona showed serious interest in him. Donk chose to go to AZ as a replacement for Joris Mathijsen who had been sold to German club Hamburger SV, thinking it to be the best for his development. Initially, AZ intended to loan Donk to Waalwijk, but he stated his intent to stay at the club in an attempt to push into the first team. He earned himself a place in the starting lineup and impressed with his performances.

==== Loan to West Brom ====
On 31 August 2008, Donk signed for West Bromwich Albion for one year on loan. He made his debut in a 1–0 win away at Middlesbrough on 28 September 2008.

=== Club Brugge ===
On 26 June 2009, Donk moved from AZ in his home country of the Netherlands, to Belgium to play for Club Brugge.

=== Kasımpaşa ===
At the start of the 2013–14 season, Donk transferred to Turkish side Kasımpaşa for an undisclosed fee. He played as a central defender for the team in his first two years, however during the first half of the 2015–16 season before transferring to Galatasaray, he played mainly as defensive midfielder.

=== Galatasaray ===
On 5 January 2016, Galatasaray announced that they had signed Donk. On 9 January 2016, Donk made his debut for Galatasaray and scored his first goal in penalty box against Karşıyaka in the 2015–16 Turkish Cup. He also made an assist for his teammate Bilal Kısa in same match.

On 31 August 2016, after being rarely used by Galatasaray during his first season at the club, Donk joined La Liga club Real Betis in a season-long loan deal, with a buyout clause.

=== Return to Kasımpaşa ===
In August 2021 Donk joined fellow Turkish club Kasımpaşa on a one-year deal, with an option for a further year.

Donk was in Hatay during the 2023 Turkey–Syria earthquake and feared for his life. He has since spoken about the trauma of the event and decided to retire at the end of the 2022–23 season due to its impact on his life.

== International career ==
In 2007 Donk was called up by Jong Oranje coach Foppe de Haan to be part of his squad for the 2007 UEFA European Under-21 Football Championship held in the Netherlands. Donk participated in both of their first round group matches against Israel (1–0 win) and Portugal (2–1 win) to secure a semi final spot and to qualify for the 2008 Summer Olympics. During the tournament his sister was involved in a car accident. Donk left the Dutch squad for a day and returned into the tournament after it was known her health was improving. After the Dutch qualified for the semi-final and Olympics Donk took off his football jersey to reveal another shirt having the text "Dit toernooi is voor jou, ik hou van je." (This tournament is dedicated to you, I love you.) on it to support his sister. In the semi-finals against England (1–1, 13–12 after 32 penalty kicks) Donk assisted Maceo Rigters to score his 90th-minute equaliser with a bicycle kick which took the game into extra time. Donk was the only Dutch player on the field at the end of the game not to shoot a penalty after one England player (Nedum Onuoha) was unable to shoot due to an injury while England had no substitutes left. The Dutch went on to retain their 2006 title by beating Serbia 4–1 in the final. After his display at the tournament, Donk made the pre-selection of the Dutch national team on 6 August.

Born in the Netherlands and of Surinamese descent, Donk was called up for a friendly match with the Suriname national football team in 2014, but was not given permission to join the squad.

In 2015, Donk expressed an interest in representing the Turkey national football team, being eligible through residence in the country. He has not received a formal callup to the team.

In November 2019, Donk got an official call up by Dean Gorré to represent Suriname. He made his debut, as a team captain, on 24 March 2021 in a World Cup qualifier against the Cayman Islands and scored the second goal in a 3–0 victory. In June 2021 Donk was named to the 23-man Suriname squad for the 2021 CONCACAF Gold Cup.

== Style of play ==
A tall and commanding defender, Donk has drawn comparisons to many former footballers – one being former Dutch defender Jaap Stam.

== Career statistics ==
=== Club ===
Appearances and goals by club, season and competition
Club	Season	League			National cup (Note: Includes KNVB Cup, FA Cup, Belgian Cup, Turkish Cup, Copa del Rey)		Europe		Other		Total	
Club	Season	Division	Apps	Goals	Apps	Goals	Apps	Goals	Apps	Goals	Apps	Goals
Waalwijk	2005–06	Eredivisie	7	0	—		—		—		7	0
Waalwijk	2006–07	Eredivisie	2	0	—		—		—		2	0
Waalwijk	Total		9	0	0	0	0	0	0	0	9	0
AZ	2006–07	Eredivisie	20	0	1	0	4	0	—		25	0
AZ	2007–08	Eredivisie	24	1	0	0	3	0	—		27	1
AZ	Total		44	1	1	0	7	0	0	0	52	1
West Bromwich Albion (loan)	2008–09	Premier League	16	0	3	0	—		—		19	0
Club Brugge	2009–10	Belgian First Division	23	2	4	0	8	0	—		35	2
Club Brugge	2010–11	Belgian First Division	36	0	2	0	7	1	—		45	1
Club Brugge	2011–12	Belgian Pro League	39	4	2	1	11	3	—		52	8
Club Brugge	2012–13	Belgian Pro League	32	4	1	0	7	0	—		40	4
Club Brugge	Total		130	10	9	1	33	4	0	0	172	15
Kasımpaşa	2013–14	Süper Lig	27	5	1	0	—		—		28	5
Kasımpaşa	2014–15	Süper Lig	32	4	0	0	—		—		32	4
Kasımpaşa	2015–16	Süper Lig	16	2	0	0	—		—		16	2
Kasımpaşa	Total		75	11	1	0	0	0	0	0	76	11
Galatasaray	2015–16	Süper Lig	14	0	6	1	2	0	—		22	1
Galatasaray	2017–18	Süper Lig	17	0	7	0	0	0	—		24	0
Galatasaray	2018–19	Süper Lig	22	2	7	0	7	0	1 (Note: Appearance in Turkish Super Cup)	0	37	2
Galatasaray	2019–20	Süper Lig	26	3	5	0	6	0	1	0	37	3
Galatasaray	2020–21	Süper Lig	16	1	0	0	1	0	–		17	1
Galatasaray	Total		95	6	25	1	16	0	2	0	137	7
Real Betis (loan)	2016–17	La Liga	16	0	2	0	—		—		18	0
Kasımpaşa	2021–22	Süper Lig	28	2	2	0	—		—		30	2
Kasımpaşa	2022–23	Süper Lig	20	1	3	0	—		—		23	1
Kasımpaşa	Total		48	3	5	0	—		—		53	3
Career total			433	31	46	2	56	4	2	0	537	37

=== International ===
Appearances and goals by national team and year
National team	Year	Apps	Goals
Suriname	2021	6	1
Suriname	2022	6	0
Total		12	1

Scores and results list Suriname's goal tally first, score column indicates score after each Donk goal.

List of international goals scored by Ryan Donk
No.	Date	Venue	Cap	Opponent	Score	Result	Competition
1	24 March 2021	Dr. Ir. Franklin Essed Stadion, Paramaribo, Suriname	1	Cayman Islands	2–0	3–0	2022 FIFA World Cup qualification

== Honours ==
Galatasaray

- Süper Lig: 2017–18, 2018–19
- Turkish Cup: 2015–16, 2018–19
- Turkish Super Cup: 2016, 2019
