= Lionel Carole =

French footballer (born 1991)

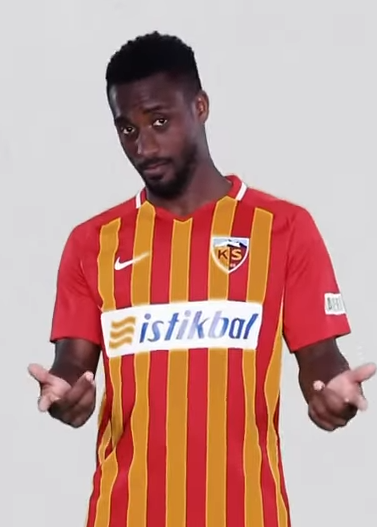
- Carole in 2021

Personal information
- Full name: Lionel Jules Carole
- Date of birth: 12 April 1991 (age 35)
- Place of birth: Montreuil, Seine-Saint-Denis, France
- Height: 1.82 m (6 ft 0 in)
- Position: Left back

Team information
- Current team: Caen
- Number: 23

Youth career
- 1997–2000: SFC Neuilly sur Marne
- 2000–2005: Villemomble Sports
- 2005–2006: Lusitanos Saint-Maur
- 2006–2007: UJA Alfortville
- 2007–2010: Nantes

Senior career*
Years	Team	Apps	(Gls)
2010–2011	Nantes	14	(0)
2011–2013	Benfica	6	(0)
2011–2012	→ Sedan (loan)	14	(0)
2012–2013	Benfica B	39	(1)
2013–2015	Troyes	75	(0)
2015–2018	Galatasaray	44	(0)
2017–2018	→ Sevilla (loan)	6	(0)
2018–2021	Strasbourg	68	(0)
2021–2026	Kayserispor	137	(0)
2026–	Caen	3	(0)

International career
2010–2012	France U20	8	(0)
2011	France U21	3	(0)
- * Club domestic league appearances and goals as of 5 September 2026

Lionel Jules Carole (born 12 April 1991) is a French professional footballer who plays as a left back for Ligue 3 club Caen. He is a French youth international, having earned caps at under-17, under-20, and under-21 level.

== Club career ==
=== Early career ===
Carole was born in Montreuil, Seine-Saint-Denis, to a French family of Martiniquais descent. His career began with hometown club UJA Alfortville. In 2000, while playing in the club's youth academy, he suffered a debilitating injury to his right eye, after a ball struck him in the face. The injury almost ended the player's career, however, his doctor gave him aerodynamic protective goggles to wear while playing, similar to former Dutch international Edgar Davids.

=== Nantes ===
Carole joined Nantes in 2006 and was, surprisingly, promoted to the senior team by manager Baptiste Gentili for the 2010–11 season, despite not having a professional contract. He made his professional debut on 17 August 2010, in a league match against Évian, appearing as a substitute in a 1–0 defeat. In the team's following match against Laval, Carole started and played the entire match in a 0–0 draw.

=== Benfica ===
On 14 January 2011, it was reported by the French and Portuguese media that Carole would be joining Portuguese club Benfica as a possible replacement for Fábio Coentrão, with the transfer set to occur in June 2011. The following day, Nantes chairman Waldemar Kita and manager Baptiste Gentili stated that they were informed by Carole that he would be signing a professional contract with the club. However, according to Gentili, the player informed him the next day that he would forgo signing a contract with Nantes and had already signed a pre-contract with Benfica. On 25 January, Nantes confirmed that Carole had left the club to sign a five-and-a-half-year deal with Benfica. Nantes was compensated a "training fee" of €750,000 and will acquire 10% of any future fee Benfica receive for the player.

Carole was assigned the number 24 shirt and made his club debut on 13 March 2011, in a league match against Portimonense. He started the match, but was substituted out after halftime in the match, which ended 1–1. In the team's ensuing league match away to Paços de Ferreira, Carole started again and scored an own goal for the hosts. Benfica, however, won the match 5–1. The defender featured in four more league matches in the season, all starts, as Benfica finished the campaign runner-up to champions Porto.

In the 2011–12 season, he was loaned to Sedan FC, acting mainly as a back-up. In the 2012–2013 season, he played for the Benfica B team, being an undisputed starter and playing in 39 official games in the Segunda Liga, acting as centre-back on occasions.

=== Troyes ===
On 9 July 2013, it was announced that Carole would be joining French club Troyes.

=== Galatasaray ===
On 11 July 2015, Carole signed a four-year contract with Turkish club Galatasaray in a €1.5 million transfer fee.

=== Sevilla (loan) ===
On 31 August 2017, Carole joined Spanish club Sevilla on a season-long loan deal with option to buy.

=== Strasbourg ===
In August 2018, Carole returned to France, joining RC Strasbourg Alsace on a three-year contract. The transfer fee paid to Galatasaray was estimated at below €600,000.

== International career ==
Carole has represented France internationally at under-17 and under-20 level. With the under-17 team, he made his youth international debut on 27 February 2008, in a friendly match against Belgium, appearing as a substitute in a 0–0 draw. That was his only appearance with the team. Carole, subsequently, was not called up to play international football at under-18 or under-19 level. In 2010, after performing well domestically with Nantes, he was called up to represent the under-20 team in preparation for the 2011 FIFA U-20 World Cup. Carole made his debut with the team on 16 November 2010, in a 1–0 victory over Montenegro.

Despite still being eligible to represent France at under-20 level, on 3 February 2011, Carole was named to the under-21 team to play in a friendly match against Slovakia on 8 February. He earned his first under-21 cap and start in the match against Slovakia, playing the entire match in a 3–1 win. Carole returned to the under-20 team in May 2011, appearing in two friendly matches against the United States. In the following month, he appeared in two friendly matches with the under-21 team, before being summoned back to the under-20 team to participate in the 2011 FIFA U-20 World Cup. He made his debut in the competition, appearing as a substitute in the team's 3–1 group stage win over South Korea.

== Career statistics ==
As of 1 July 2019

Appearances and goals by club, season and competition
Club	Season	League			Cup (Note: Includes Coupe de France, Coupe de la Ligue, Trophée des Champions, Taça de Portugal, Taça da Liga, Supertaça Cândido de Oliveira, Turkish Cup, Turkish Super Cup)		Continental (Note: Includes UEFA Supercup)		Total	
Club	Season	Division	Apps	Goals	Apps	Goals	Apps	Goals	Apps	Goals
Nantes	2010–11	Ligue 2	14	0	2	0	0	0	16	0
Benfica	2010–11	Primeira Liga	6	0	0	0	0	0	6	0
Benfica B	2012–13	Segunda Liga	39	1	0	0	0	0	39	1
Sedan (loan)	2011–12	Ligue 2	14	0	1	0	0	0	15	0
Troyes	2013–14	Ligue 2	38	0	7	0	0	0	45	0
Troyes	2014–15	Ligue 2	37	0	3	0	0	0	40	0
Troyes	Total		75	0	10	0	0	0	85	0
Galatasaray	2015–16	Süper Lig	19	0	9	0	5	0	33	0
Galatasaray	2016–17	Süper Lig	25	0	6	1	0	0	31	1
Galatasaray	Total		44	0	15	1	5	0	64	1
Sevilla (loan)	2017–18	La Liga	6	0	3	0	0	0	9	0
Strasbourg	2018–19	Ligue 1	23	0	4	0	1	0	28	0
Career total			221	1	35	1	8	0	264	2

== Honours ==
Galatasaray

- Turkish Cup: 2015–16
- Turkish Super Cup: 2015, 2016
