= Emre Çolak =

Turkish footballer

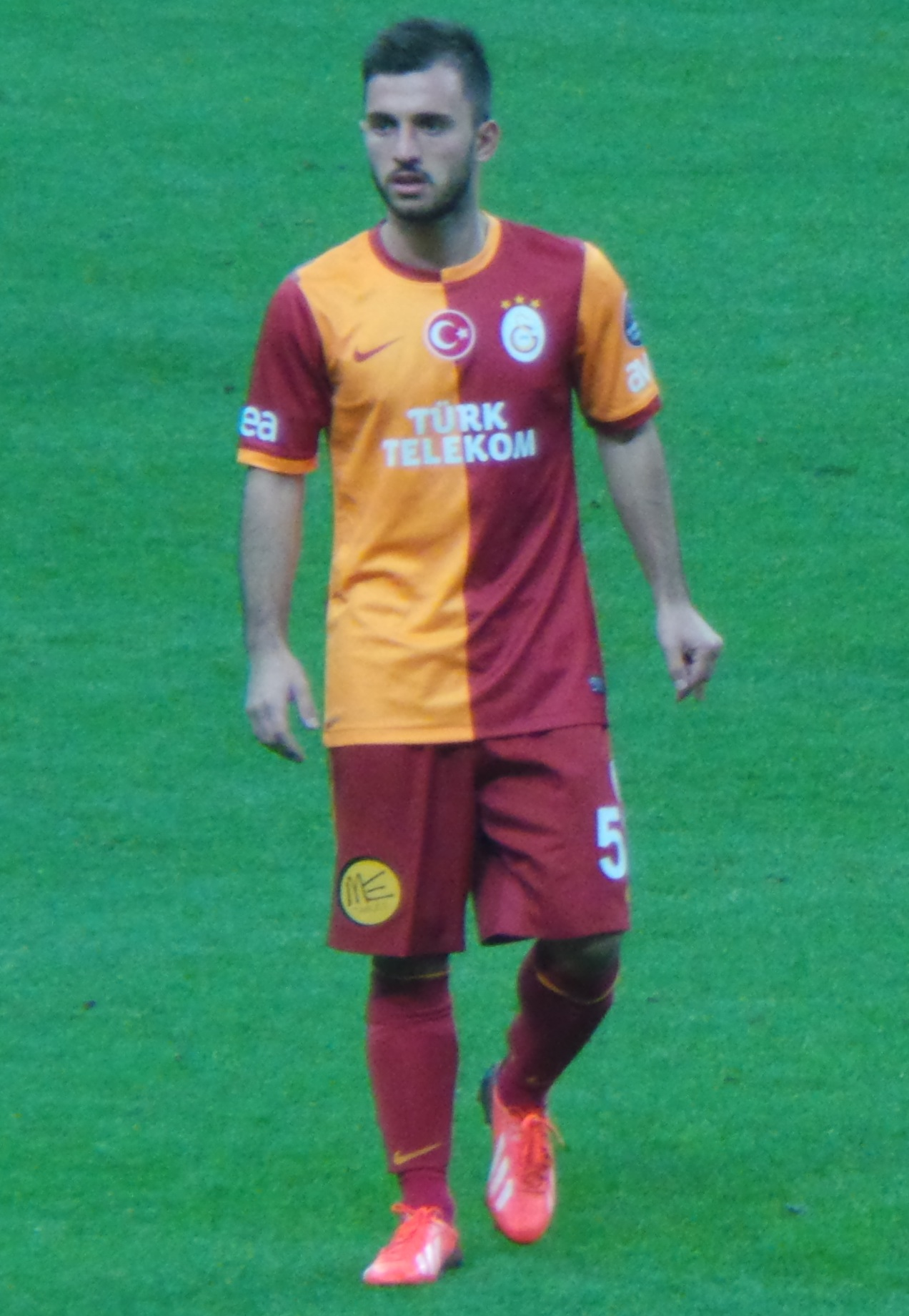
- Emre playing for Galatasaray in 2013

Personal information
- Date of birth: 20 May 1991 (age 35)
- Place of birth: Istanbul, Turkey
- Height: 1.69 m (5 ft 7 in)
- Positions: Attacking midfielder; winger

Youth career
- 2002–2004: Atışalanıspor
- 2004–2009: Galatasaray A2

Senior career*
Years	Team	Apps	(Gls)
2010–2016	Galatasaray	132	(10)
2016–2018	Deportivo La Coruña	59	(4)
2018–2019	Al-Wehda	15	(1)
2020–2021	Deportivo La Coruña	16	(2)
2021	Fatih Karagümrük	9	(0)
2021	Hatayspor	8	(0)
2022	İstanbul Başakşehir	7	(0)
2022–2023	Göztepe	8	(0)
2023	Intercity	1	(0)
Total		254	(17)

International career^{‡}
2006	Turkey U15	2	(0)
2006–2008	Turkey U16	21	(3)
2007–2009	Turkey U17	30	(5)
2008–2009	Turkey U18	11	(3)
2009–2010	Turkey U19	10	(4)
2010–2012	Turkey U21	15	(2)
2012–2023	Turkey A2	10	(3)
2012–2017	Turkey	4	(0)
- * Club domestic league appearances and goals as of 13 February 2023 ‡ National team caps and goals as of 06:16, 28 August 2021 (UTC)

Emre Çolak (Turkish pronunciation: [emɾe tʃoɫak], born 20 May 1991) is a Turkish former professional footballer who played as an attacking midfielder or a winger.

Emre has represented Turkey at every youth international level, before making his senior debut in a FIFA World Cup qualifier against Romania in 2012 under coach Abdullah Avcı.

== Club career ==
=== Galatasaray ===
He began his football career playing for amateur side Atışalanıspor, before being invited to train with Beşiktaş for several months, but he eventually chose to return to his first club. After continuing his impressive performance at Atışalanıspor, he was finally scouted by Galatasaray, where he eventually joined the Youth Academy at the age of 13.

Emre rose through the ranks of the Galatasaray youth and academy team, and was promoted to the first team during the 2009–10 season. He scored two goals on his first team debut, in a cup match against Denizli Belediyespor on 17 January 2010. He made his league debut for Gala in a home match against Gaziantepspor coming on as a substitute in the second half for Arda Turan. He scored his first league goal on the final day of the 2009–10 season, in a 2–1 away loss to Gençlerbirliği.

Emre started to play mainly in the 2011-2012 season and scored his first goals of the season against İstanbul Başakşehir as Galatasaray won 4–1. On 25 January 2012, Emre scored another goal against Ankaragücü in a 4–0 win.

On 16 February 2012, his contract was extended for 2 years until 2016.

On 19 September 2012, he made his UEFA Champions League debut in a Group match against Manchester United, impressing as a second-half substitute in a game with Galatasaray narrowly lost 1–0. He scored his first goal for the season against rivals Beşiktaş as Galatasaray won 2–1.

=== Deportivo de La Coruña ===
On 27 May 2016, his switch to the La Liga side Deportivo de La Coruña on a three-year contract was announced.

=== Fatih Karagümrük ===
On 16 December 2020, Emre signed for Süper Lig club Fatih Karagümrük.

=== Intercity ===
In January 2023, Çolak returned to Spain to join Intercity on a deal until the end of the season.

On 13 February 2023, Çolak announced his retirement from football.

== Career statistics ==
=== Club ===
As of 20 May 2018.

Club	Season	League		Cup		Super Cup		Europe		Total	
Club	Season	Apps	Goals	Apps	Goals	Apps	Goals	Apps	Goals	Apps	Goals
Galatasaray	2009–10	8	1	3	3	—		—		11	4
Galatasaray	2010–11	13	0	3	0	—		1	0	17	0
Galatasaray	2011–12	29	3	1	0	—		—		30	3
Galatasaray	2012–13	24	1	2	1	1	0	6	0	33	2
Galatasaray	2013–14	15	0	7	1	1	0	0	0	23	1
Galatasaray	2014–15	25	4	9	2	0	0	2	0	36	6
Galatasaray	2015–16	18	1	9	2	1	0	2	0	30	3
Total		132	10	34	9	3	0	11	0	180	19
Deportivo La Coruña	2016–17	33	3	3	0	—		—		36	3
Deportivo La Coruña	2017–18	26	1	1	1	—		—		27	2
Total		59	4	4	1	—		—		63	5
Career total		165	13	37	9	3	0	11	0	216	22

=== International ===
Turkey national team
Year	Apps	Goals
2012	2	0
2017	2	0
Total	4	0

== Honours ==
Galatasaray

- Süper Lig: 2011–12, 2012–13, 2014–15
- Türkiye Kupası: 2013–14, 2014–15, 2015–16
- Süper Kupa: 2012, 2013, 2015
