= Kastamonu Gazi Stadium =

Stadium in Turkey

Coordinates: 41.365504°N 33.767113°E

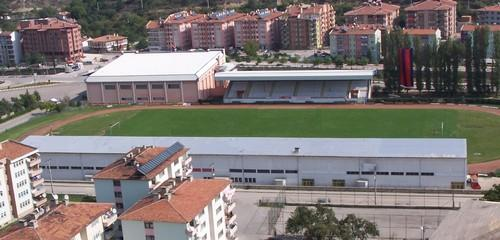
- Interactive map of Kastamonu Gazi Stadium
- Full name: Kastamonu Gazi Stadı
- Location: Kastamonu, Turkey
- Owner: Kastamonuspor 1966
- Capacity: 4,500
- Surface: Grass

Construction
- Opened: 1984

Kastamonu Gazi Stadium (Turkish: Kastamonu Gazi Stadyumu) is a football stadium in Kastamonu, Turkey. It is used mostly for football matches and was the home ground of Kastamonuspor. After dissolution of the team, the stadium became the home ground of Kastamonuspor 1966. The stadium was opened in 1984, and holds 4,500 spectators.

The stadium renewed in the 2009-2010 season.
