= Berk İsmail Ünsal =

Turkish footballer

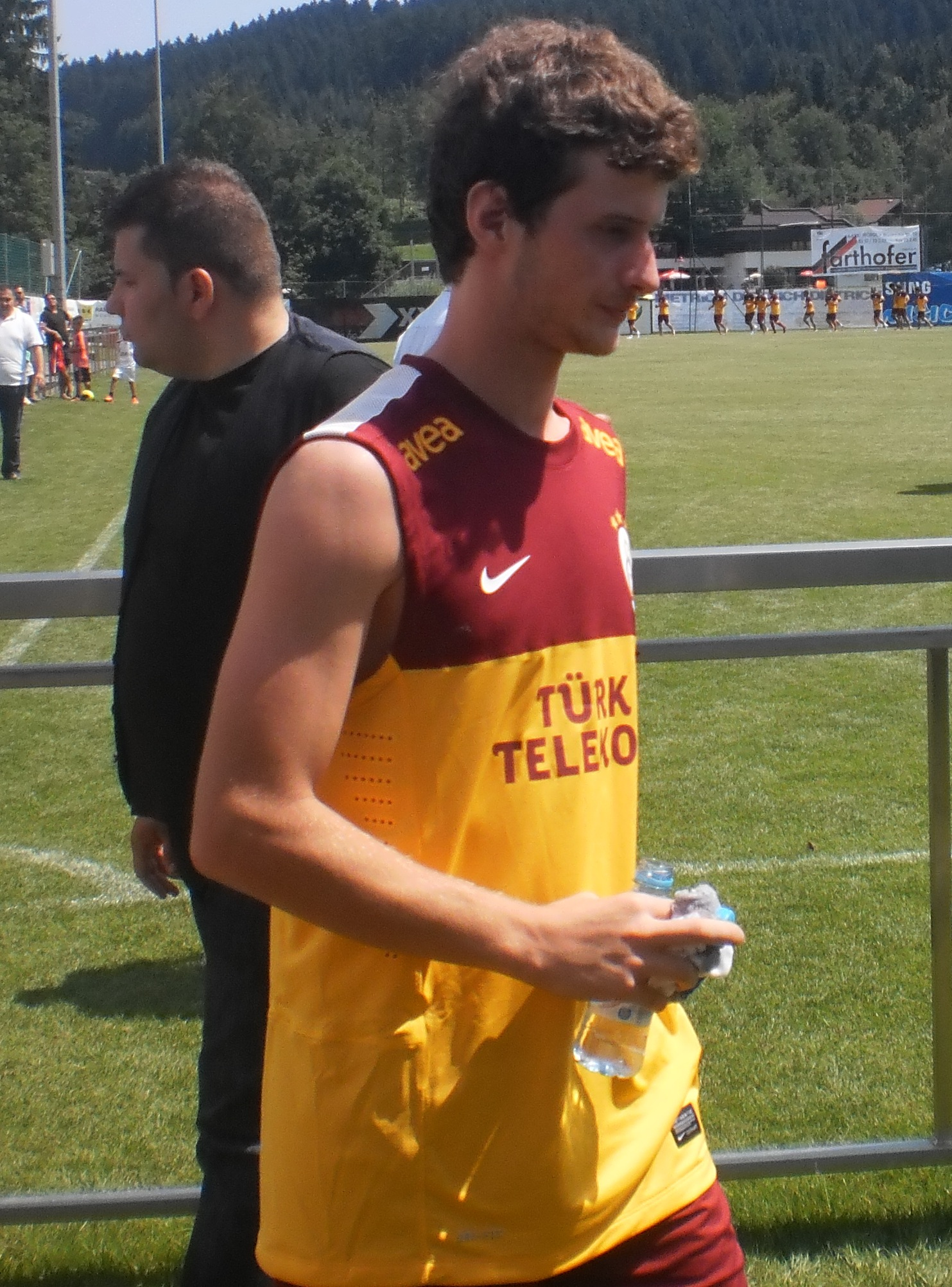

Personal information
- Date of birth: 6 August 1994 (age 32)
- Place of birth: Gaziosmanpaşa, Turkey
- Height: 1.90 m (6 ft 3 in)
- Position: Striker

Team information
- Current team: Şanlıurfaspor
- Number: 14

Youth career
- 2007–2011: Gaziosmanpaşaspor
- 2011–2014: Galatasaray A2

Senior career*
Years	Team	Apps	(Gls)
2014–2017	Galatasaray	3	(0)
2014–2015	→ Antalyaspor (loan)	21	(2)
2015–2016	→ Giresunspor (loan)	9	(2)
2017–2018	Gümüşhanespor	31	(5)
2018–2021	Sakaryaspor	84	(35)
2021–2022	Bodrumspor	29	(10)
2022–2023	Esenler Erokspor	32	(12)
2023–2024	Amed	34	(19)
2024–2025	Serik Belediyespor	33	(10)
2025–	Şanlıurfaspor	7	(5)

International career
2010	Turkey U17	2	(0)
2011–2012	Turkey U18	8	(5)
2012–2013	Turkey U19	12	(4)
2012	Turkey U20	5	(0)
- * Club domestic league appearances and goals as of 5 October 2025

Berk İsmail Ünsal (born 6 August 1994) is a Turkish footballer who plays as a striker for TFF 2. Lig club Şanlıurfaspor.

== Club career ==
=== Galatasaray ===
Ünsal started his professional career at Galatasaray, where he trained. On 29 March 2014, he played his first Süper Lig match for Cim-Bom, against Torku Konyaspor, where he stayed on the pitch almost 28 minutes and replaced for his teammate Umut Bulut in the 62nd minute. The match was a 0–0 draw. His second Süper Lig match was against Kasımpaşa, where Galatasaray was defeated. He was in the first XI, played 49 minutes on the pitch, and Yekta Kurtuluş replaced instead of him for tactical changing. The match ended in a 0–4 loss for Gala. On 27 April 2014, Ünsal replaced instead of Yekta Kurtuluş in 87th minute and played almost 2 or 3 minutes against Elazığspor, where Cim-Bom won 0–1.

== Career statistics ==
(As of 3 September 2014)

Club	Season	League		Cup		Continental		Other		Total	
Club	Season	Apps	Goals	Apps	Goals	Apps	Goals	Apps	Goals	Apps	Goals
Galatasaray	2013–14	3	0	2	0	0	0	—		5	0
Galatasaray	Subtotal	3	0	2	0	0	0	—		5	0
Antalyaspor (loan)	2014–15	0	0	0	0	—		—		0	0
Antalyaspor (loan)	Subtotal	0	0	0	0	0	0	—		0	0
Career total		3	0	2	0	0	0	0	0	5	0

== Honours ==
Galatasaray

- Türkiye Kupası: 2013–14
