= Kastamonuspor =

Turkish football club

- Full name: Kastamonu Spor Kulübü
- Nickname: Dep Dep
- Founded: 1966
- Dissolved: 2014
- Ground: Gazi Stadium
- Capacity: 4,500
- League: Kastamonu First Amateur League
- 2014-15: Withdrawn
Home colours	Away colours

Kastamonu Spor Kulübü was a Turkish football club founded in 1966. The club was located in Kastamonu, Turkey.

== History ==
Kastamonuspor began to compete at the second level in the 1967 – 1968 season. They was relegated to the amateur level following the 1976 – 1977 season. The team returned to professional leagues by promoting TFF Third League in the 1984 – 1985 season. The team advanced to the TFF Second League promotion playoffs in both the 2007 –2008 and 2008 –2009 season but failed to promote to second league. In the 2012 –2013 season Kastamonuspor relegated to Regional Amateur League. In the next season, 2013 –2014 they relegated once again to Kastamonu First Amateur League. At the start of the next season, Kastamonuspor decided to merge with another team from Kastamonu, Tosya Belediyespor that had advanced to Regional Amateur League in the previous season. In November 2014 Kastamonuspor withdrew from the league and dissolved.

== Stadium ==
Kastamonuspor played their home games at Gazi Stadium.
