= 2015–16 Turkish Cup =

Ziraat Turkish Cup

Tournament details
- Country: Turkey
- Teams: 159

Final positions
- Champions: Galatasaray
- Runners-up: Fenerbahçe

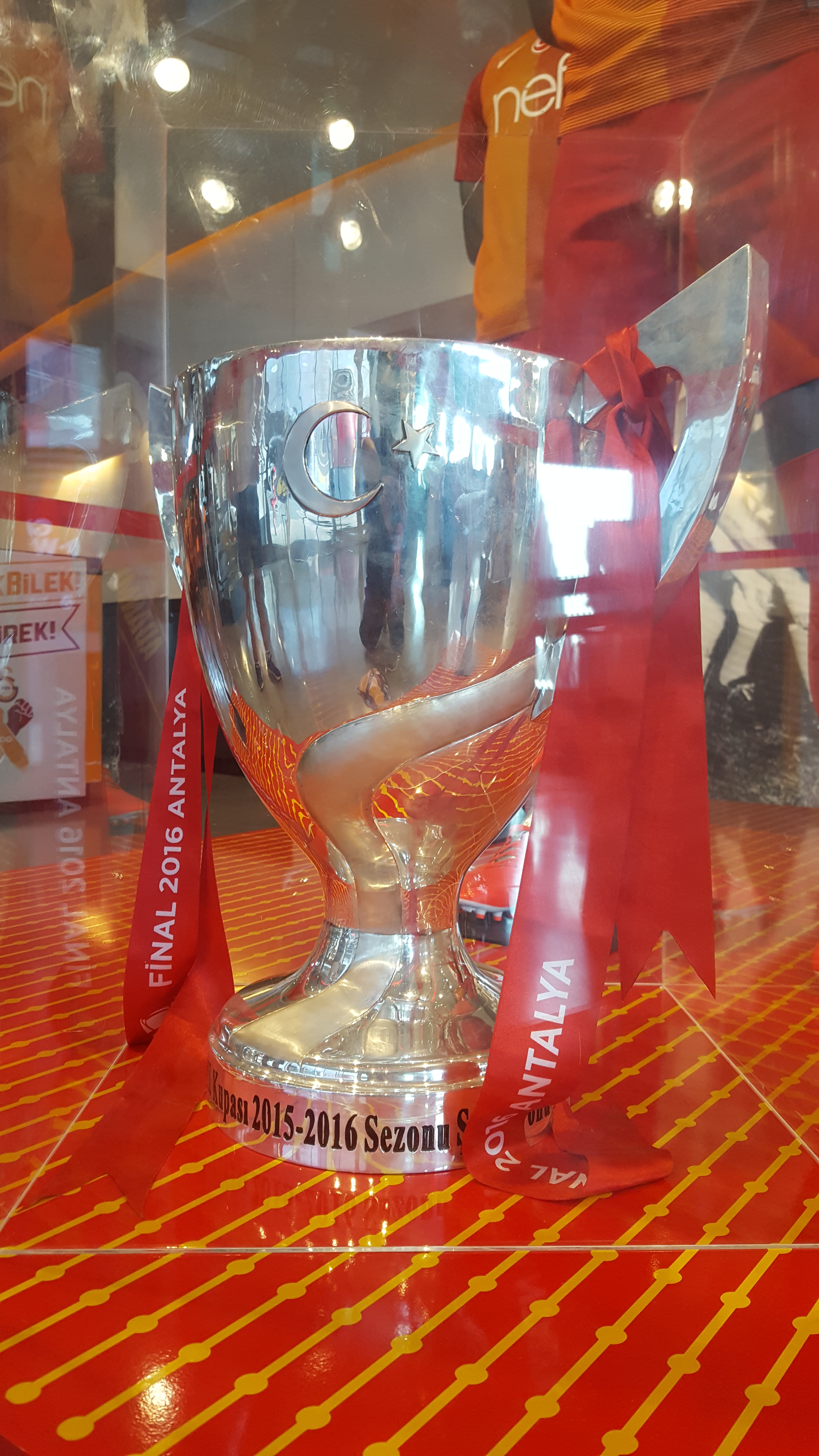
2015-16 Türkiye Kupası

The 2015–16 Turkish Cup (Turkish: Türkiye Kupası) is the 54th season of the Turkish Cup. Ziraat Bankası is the sponsor of the tournament, thus the sponsored name is Ziraat Turkish Cup. The winners will earn a berth in the group stage of the 2016–17 UEFA Europa League, and also qualify for the 2016 Turkish Super Cup.

== Competition format ==
Round	Clubs remaining	Clubs involved	Winners from previous round	New entries this round	Leagues entering at this round
Preliminary round	159	30	0	30	Regional Amateur League
First round	144	72	15	57	Third League
Second round	108	98	36	62	Second League, First League, Super League (11-18)
Third round	59	54	49	5	Super League (6-10)
Group stage	32	32	27	5	Super League (1-5)
Round of 16	16	16	16	0	
Quarter finals	8	8	8	0	
Semi finals	4	4	4	0	
Final	2	2	2	0	

== Preliminary round ==
- 30 teams from Regional Amateur League competed in this round.
- 15 teams (50%) from Regional Amateur League qualified for the next round.
- 9 seeded (60%) and 6 unseeded (40%) teams qualified for the next round.

Home	Score	Away
Adıyaman 1954 SK	1 - 2	Kilis Belediyespor
Kızıltepe Fıratspor	2 - 0	Muş Demirspor
Iğdır Aras	1 - 0	Sarıkamış Bld.
Yüksekova Belediye	0 - 1	Kurtalanspor
12 Bingölspor	0 - 6	Osmaniyespor FK
Ağrı Gençlerbirliği	1 - 2	Tatvan G.Birliği
Arhavispor	1 - 0	Serhat Ardahan
Aksaray 1989 SK	0 - 1	Nevşehirspor GK
Yozgatspor 1959 FK	2 - 0	Yesil Kirsehir
Türk Metal Kırıkkale	1 - 2	Yeni Amasyaspor
Eğirdirspor	1 - 3	Utaş Uşakspor
Sinopspor	1 - 0	Çankırı Bld GK
Karaman Belediyespor	4 - 0	Bucak Bld.Oğuzhan
Altınova Belediyespor	8 - 0	Bilecik İl Özel İdaresi
Edirnespor	1 - 2	Bartınspor

== First round ==
- 57 teams from Third League and 15 teams from Regional Amateur League competed in this round.
- 30 teams (53%) from Third League and 6 teams (40%) from Regional Amateur League qualified for the next round.
- 17 seeded (47%) and 19 unseeded (53%) teams qualified for the next round.

Home	Score	Away
Düzyurtspor	1 - 0	Bayburt Grup Özel İdare
Kırıkhanspor	1 - 1	Payasspor
Kızıltepe Fıratspor	1 - 6	Diyarbakırspor
Ofspor	1 - 2	Yomraspor
24 Erzincanspor	3 - 2	Zara Belediyespor
Batman Petrolspor	0 - 1	Cizre Spor
Arhavispor	2 - 2	Arsinspor
Körfez İskenderunspor	1 - 1	Erzin Belediyespor
Osmaniyespor FK	0 - 0	Kilis Belediyespor
Kurtalanspor	2 - 0	Tatvan G.Birliği
Ankara Adliyespor	1 - 0	Nevşehirspor GK
Kastamonuspor 1966	2 - 2	Bartınspor
Çorum Belediyespor	4 - 1	Kızılcahamamspor
Karaman Belediyespor	1 - 0	Kozan Belediyespor
Etimesgut Belediyespor	2 - 0	Yozgatspor 1959 FK
Sinopspor	0 - 1	Yeni Amasyaspor
Manavgatspor	3 - 1	Kemerspor 2003
Dardanelspor	1 - 0	Yeşil Bursa
Maltepespor	1 - 1	Tekirdağspor
Utaş Uşakspor	2 - 0	Sandıklıspor
Kızılcabölükspor	3 - 2	Denizli BBSK
Manisa BBSK	2 - 0	Altay
Turgutluspor	0 - 1	Tire 1922
Orhangazispor	2 - 0	Tavşanlı Linyitspor
Duzcespor	2 - 1	Sakaryaspor
Ayvalıkgücü Belediyespor	1 - 2	Çine Madranspor
Sancaktepe Belediyespor	1 - 1	Silivrispor
Bursa Nilüferspor	2 - 1	Altınova Belediyespor
Derincespor	0 - 1	Zonguldak Kömürspor
BB Bodrumspor	2 - 1	Bergama Belediyespor
Gaziosmanpaşa	1 - 3	Çatalcaspor
Gölcukspor	0 - 0	Darıca Genclerbirligi
Beylerbeyispor	0 - 3	Sultanbeyli Belediyespor
Kahramanmaraş BBSK	2 - 0	Niğde Belediyespor
Büyükşehir Belediye Erzurumspor	3 - 1	Dersimspor
Iğdır Aras	1 - 0	Van BBSK

== Second round ==
- 8 teams from Super League, 18 teams from First League, 36 teams from Second League, 30 teams from Third League and 6 teams from Regional Amateur League competed in this round.
- 7 teams (88%) from Super League, 12 teams (67%) from First League, 18 teams (50%) from Second League, 10 teams (33%) from Third League and 2 teams (33%) from Regional Amateur League qualified for the next round.
- 34 seeded (69%) and 15 unseeded (31%) teams qualified for the next round.

Home	Score	Away
Osmanlıspor FK	6 - 0	Kızılcabölükspor
Amedspor	2 - 1	Karaman Belediyespor
Yeni Amasyaspor	1 - 2	Fatih Karagümrükspor
1461 Trabzon	4 - 0	Tarsus İdman Yurdu
Bandırmaspor	1 - 1	Keçiörengücü
Manisa BBSK	2 - 3	Balıkesirspor
Büyükçekmece Tepecikspor	2 - 1	Samsunspor
Kilis Belediyespor	1 - 3	Ümraniyespor
MKE Ankaragücü	0 - 2	Payasspor
Denizlispor	0 - 0	Fethiyespor
Akhisar Belediyespor	2 - 0	Yomraspor
Göztepe	1 - 1	Büyükşehir Belediye Erzurumspor
Kahramanmaraş BBSK	0 - 1	Adanaspor
Medicana Sivasspor	0 - 1	Diyarbekirspor
Antalyaspor	1 - 0	Çorum Belediyespor
Iğdır Aras	1 - 0	Altınordu
Zonguldak Kömürspor	0 - 1	Kayserispor
Cizre Spor	1 - 2	Nazilli Belediyespor
Kurtalanspor	1 - 3	Karşıyaka
Ankarademirspor	1 - 2	Sariyer
Hacettepe Spor	1 - 1	Çine Madranspor
Kahramanmaraşspor	0 - 1	Pazarspor
Etimesgut Belediyespor	3 - 0	Hatayspor
Kastamonuspor 1966	3 - 0	Konya Anadolu Selçukspor
Sivas 4 Eylül Belediyespor	2 - 2	Alanyaspor
Pendikspor	0 - 1	24 Erzincanspor
BB Bodrumspor	0 - 5	Menemen Belediye Spor
Sultanbeyli Belediyespor	1 - 3	Şanlıurfaspor
Duzcespor	1 - 1	Kocaeli Birlikspor
Manavgatspor	0 - 1	Adana Demirspor
Dardanelspor	5 - 4	Tokatspor
Orhangazispor	1 - 0	Yeni Malatyaspor
Tekirdağspor	2 - 0	Orduspor
Golcukspor	1 - 0	Kayseri Erciyesspor
Kartalspor	3 - 1	Düzyurtspor
Kırklarelispor	2 - 1	Bugsaşspor
Utaş Uşakspor	1 - 0	Bayrampaşa
İstanbulspor	0 - 1	Manisaspor
Bucaspor	1 - 0	Sancaktepe Belediyespor
Aydınspor 1923	3 - 1	Anadolu Uskudar 1908
İnegölspor	1 - 0	Gümüşhanespor
Giresunspor	2 - 0	Eyup
Elazigspor	1 - 0	Bursa Nilüferspor
Boluspor	3 - 0	Çatalcaspor
Karabükspor	2 - 0	Arsinspor
Gaziantep BB	1 - 1	Tuzlaspor
Çaykur Rizespor	2 - 0	Ankara Adliyespor
Kasimpasa	3 - 0	Tire 1922
Eskişehirspor	1 - 0	Körfez İskenderunspor

== Third round ==
- 12 teams from Super League, 12 teams from First League, 18 teams from Second League, 10 teams from Third League and 2 teams from Regional Amateur League will compete in this round.
- 9 teams (75%) from Super League, 7 teams (47%) from First League, 9 teams (50%) from Second League and 2 teams (20%) from Third League qualified for the next round. None of teams from Regional Amateur League was qualified.
- 17 seeded (59%) and 10 unseeded (41%) teams qualified for the next round.

Home	Score	Away
Sarıyer	2 - 7	Kayserispor
Amedspor	2 - 1	Elazığspor
24 Erzincaspor	1 - 1	Antalyaspor
Aydınspor 1923	1 - 0	Denizlispor
Osmanlıspor FK	0 - 1	Büyükçekmece Tepecikspor
Bursaspor	3 - 0	Utaş Uşakspor
Torku Konyaspor	4 - 1	Kocaeli Birlikspor
Iğdır Aras	1 - 3	Bandırmaspor
Etimesgut Belediyespor	1 - 0	Gençlerbirliği
Çine Madranspor	1 - 2	Bucaspor
Karabükspor	5 - 2	Payasspor
Şanlıurfaspor	1 - 0	Kırklarelispor
Fatih Karagümrük	3 - 3	Mersin İdman Yurdu
İnegölspor	1 - 1	Balıkesirspor
Kastamonuspor 1966	3 - 3	Kasımpaşa
1461 Trabzon	3 - 0	Pazarspor
Tuzlaspor	1 - 0	Manisaspor
Boluspor	4 - 1	Ümraniyespor
Karşıyaka	3 - 2	Tekirdağspor
Ankara Demirspor	2 - 4	Sivas Belediyespor
Çaykur Rizepor	1 - 0	Orhangazispor
Menemen Belediyespor	0 - 1	Eskişehirspor
Kartalspor	0 - 2	Giresunspor
Göztepe	1 - 2	Nazilli Belediyespor
Adanaspor	3 - 1	Diyarbekirspor
Gaziantepspor	5 - 2	Gölcükspor
Akhisar Belediyespor	5 - 0	Dardanelspor

== Group stage ==
Top five teams from 2014–15 Süper Lig joined 27 winners from the third round for the group stage. The group draw will commence on 7 December 2015, as 32 teams were split into 8 groups of 4 teams. This stage is a round-robin tournament with home and away matches, in the vein of UEFA European competitions' group stages. The winners and runners-up of the eight groups will advance to the round of 16.

Pot 1	Pot 2	Pot 3	Pot 4
Galatasaray; Fenerbahçe; Beşiktaş; İstanbul Başakşehir; Trabzonspor; Bursaspor; Mersin İdman Yurdu; Konyaspor	Gaziantepspor; Eskişehirspor; Akhisar Belediyespor; Çaykur Rizespor; Kayserispor; Antalyaspor; Kardemir Karabükspor; Şanlıurfaspor	Karşıyaka; Boluspor; Giresunspor; Adanaspor; 1461 Trabzon; Bucaspor; Bandırmaspor; İnegölspor	Nazilli Belediyespor; Aydınspor 1923; Amedspor; Büyükçekmece Tepecikspor; Tuzlaspor; Sivas Belediyespor; Etimesgut Belediyespor; Kastamonuspor 1966

=== Group A ===
Pos	Team	Pld	W	D	L	GF	GA	GD	Pts
1	İstanbul Başakşehir	6	4	2	0	16	7	+9	14
2	Amedspor	6	3	3	0	12	8	+4	12
3	Bandırmaspor	6	1	2	3	9	10	−1	5
4	Şanlıurfaspor	6	0	1	5	1	13	−12	1

=== Group B ===
Pos	Team	Pld	W	D	L	GF	GA	GD	Pts
1	Bursaspor	6	6	0	0	18	7	+11	18
2	Büyükçekmece Tepecikspor	6	2	1	3	11	14	−3	7 (Note: Ranked by goal difference)
3	Eskişehirspor	6	2	1	3	10	11	−1	7
4	Boluspor	6	1	0	5	4	11	−7	3

=== Group C ===
Pos	Team	Pld	W	D	L	GF	GA	GD	Pts
1	Sivas Belediyespor	6	4	0	2	13	13	0	12
2	Beşiktaş	6	3	1	2	10	7	+3	10 (Note: Ranked by goal difference)
3	1461 Trabzon	6	3	1	2	15	4	+11	10
4	Kardemir Karabükspor	6	1	0	5	3	17	−14	3

=== Group D ===
Pos	Team	Pld	W	D	L	GF	GA	GD	Pts
1	Bucaspor	6	5	0	1	10	7	+3	15
2	Çaykur Rizespor	6	4	1	1	14	8	+6	13
3	Mersin İdman Yurdu	6	1	1	4	7	10	−3	4
4	Aydınspor 1923	6	1	0	5	6	12	−6	3

=== Group E ===
Pos	Team	Pld	W	D	L	GF	GA	GD	Pts
1	Galatasaray	6	5	1	0	15	6	+9	16
2	Akhisar Belediyespor	6	2	2	2	6	6	0	8
3	Karşıyaka	6	2	0	4	7	11	−4	6
4	Kastamonuspor 1966	6	1	1	4	6	11	−5	4

=== Group F ===
Pos	Team	Pld	W	D	L	GF	GA	GD	Pts
1	Trabzonspor	6	5	0	1	12	4	+8	15
2	Gaziantepspor	6	3	2	1	8	5	+3	11
3	Adanaspor	6	2	1	3	8	13	−5	7
4	Nazilli Belediyespor	6	0	1	5	2	8	−6	1

=== Group G ===
Pos	Team	Pld	W	D	L	GF	GA	GD	Pts
1	Torku Konyaspor	6	5	1	0	8	2	+6	16
2	Kayserispor	6	4	0	2	11	4	+7	12
3	İnegölspor	6	2	1	3	5	6	−1	7
4	Etimesgut Belediyespor	6	0	0	6	3	15	−12	0

=== Group H ===
Pos	Team	Pld	W	D	L	GF	GA	GD	Pts
1	Fenerbahçe	6	5	1	0	15	4	+11	16
2	Antalyaspor	6	3	2	1	7	6	+1	11
3	Tuzlaspor	6	2	1	3	5	5	0	7
4	Giresunspor	6	0	0	6	2	14	−12	0

== Knockout stage ==
Group	Winners	Runners-up
A	İstanbul Başakşehir	Amedspor
B	Bursaspor	Büyükçekmece Tepecikspor
C	Sivas Belediyespor	Beşiktaş
D	Bucaspor	Çaykur Rizespor
E	Galatasaray	Akhisar Belediyespor
F	Trabzonspor	Gaziantepspor
G	Konyaspor	Kayserispor
H	Fenerbahçe	Antalyaspor

Süper Lig			TFF 2.Lig
**Galatasaray**(TH); **Fenerbahçe**; **Beşiktaş**; **İstanbul Başakşehir**	Trabzonspor; Bursaspor; **Konyaspor**; Gaziantepspor	**Akhisar Belediyespor**; **Çaykur Rizespor**; Kayserispor; Antalyaspor	Bucaspor; **Amedspor**; Büyükçekmece Tepecikspor; Sivas Belediyespor

Active teams shown in bold.

=== Bracket ===
Round of 16
1	**İstanbul Başakşehir**	4
16	Büyükçekmece Tepecikspor	0
8	Sivas Belediyespor	0
9	**Çaykur Rizespor**	2
5	Trabzonspor	0
12	**Akhisar Belediyespor**	1
4	**Galatasaray**	3
13	Gaziantepspor	1
6	Bucaspor	0
11	**Beşiktaş**	2
3	**Konyaspor**	1
14	Antalyaspor	0
7	Bursaspor	1
10	**Amedspor**	2
2	**Fenerbahçe**	1
15	Kayserispor	0

Quarter-finals
İstanbul Başakşehir	0	0	0
**Çaykur Rizespor**	2	1	3
Akhisar Belediyespor	1	1	2
**Galatasaray**	2	1	3
Beşiktaş	1	0	1
**Konyaspor**	2	1	3
Amedspor	3	1	4
**Fenerbahçe**	3	3	6

Semi-finals
Çaykur Rizespor	1	0	1
**Galatasaray**	3	0	3
Konyaspor	0	0	0
**Fenerbahçe**	3	2	5

Final
**Galatasaray**	1
Fenerbahçe	0

=== Round of 16 ===
==== Summary table ====
Team 1	Score	Team 2
**İstanbul Başakşehir**	4–0	Büyükçekmece Tepecikspor
Bursaspor	1–2	**Amedspor**
Sivas Belediyespor	0–2	**Çaykur Rizespor**
Bucaspor	0–2	**Beşiktaş**
**Galatasaray**	3–1	Gaziantepspor
Trabzonspor	0–1	**Akhisar Belediyespor**
**Konyaspor**	1–0	Antalyaspor
**Fenerbahçe**	1–0	Kayserispor

==== Matches ====
30 January 2016	**Fenerbahçe**	**1–0** (a.e.t.)	**Kayserispor**
20:45	Diego 113'

31 January 2016	**Bursaspor**	**1–2**	**Amedspor**
14:00	De Sutter 90'		Çapar 20'; Naki 65'

31 January 2016	**Konyaspor**	**1–0**	**Antalyaspor**
16:00	Vuković 81'

31 January 2016	**Bucaspor**	**0–2**	**Beşiktaş**
17:45			Yılmaz 61' (o.g.); Özyakup 73' (pen.)

31 January 2016	**Sivas Belediyespor**	**0–2**	**Çaykur Rizespor**
18:30			Dhurgham 18'; Tuszyński 80'

31 January 2016	**Galatasaray**	**3–1**	**Gaziantepspor**
20:45	Adın 20'; Gümüş 25'; Yılmaz 57'		Habibou 75'

1 February 2016	**İstanbul Başakşehir**	**4–0**	**Büyükçekmece Tepecikspor**
18:00	Batdal 37', 60'; Cikalleshi 79'; Doka 87'

1 February 2016	**Trabzonspor**	**0–1**	**Akhisar Belediyespor**
20:45			Douglão 21'

=== Quarter-finals ===
==== Summary table ====
Team 1	Agg.	Team 2	1st leg	2nd leg
İstanbul Başakşehir	0–3	**Çaykur Rizespor**	0–2	0–1
Akhisar Belediyespor	2–3	**Galatasaray**	1–2	1–1
Beşiktaş	1–3	**Konyaspor**	1–2	0–1
Amed	4–6	**Fenerbahçe**	3–3	1–3

==== First leg ====
9 February 2016	**Amed**	**3–3**	**Fenerbahçe**	Diyarbakır
13:00	Özer 10'; Coşkun 68'; Yagmur 70'	Report	Civelek 15'; Fernandão 44'; Şen 76'	Stadium: Seyrantepe DİSKİ Sport Facility

10 February 2016	**Akhisar Belediyespor**	**1–2**	**Galatasaray**	Manisa
18:45	Rodallega 53'	Report	Douglão 70' (o.g.); İnan 72'	Stadium: 19 Mayıs Stadium

10 February 2016	**Beşiktaş**	**1–2**	**Konyaspor**	Istanbul
21:15	Tosun 31'	Result	Bajić 65'; Fındıklı 79'	Stadium: Atatürk Olympic Stadium

11 February 2016	**İstanbul Başakşehir**	**0–2**	**Çaykur Rizespor**	Istanbul
20:45			Yalçın 6'; Akyüz 70'	Stadium: Fatih Terim Stadium

==== Second leg ====
1 March 2016	**Çaykur Rizespor**	**1–0**	**İstanbul Başakşehir**	Rize
20:00	Duruer 90+3'			Stadium: Çaykur Didi Stadium

2 March 2016	**Galatasaray**	**1–1**	**Akhisar Belediyespor**	Istanbul
18:15				Stadium: Türk Telekom Arena

3 March 2016	**Fenerbahçe**	**3–1**	**Amed**	Istanbul
18:15	Topuz 31'; Fernandão 40'; Nani 88'		Icer 77'	Stadium: Ülker Stadium

3 March 2016	**Konyaspor**	**1–0**	**Beşiktaş**	Konya
20:45				Stadium: Torku Arena

=== Semi-finals ===
==== Summary table ====
Team 1	Agg.	Team 2	1st leg	2nd leg
Çaykur Rizespor	1–3	**Galatasaray**	1–3	0–0
Konyaspor	0–5	**Fenerbahçe**	0–3	0–2

==== First leg ====
20 April 2016	**Çaykur Rizespor**	**1–3**	**Galatasaray**	Rize
18.45				Stadium: Çaykur Didi Stadium

20 April 2016	**Konyaspor**	**0–3**	**Fenerbahçe**	Konya
21.15

==== Second leg ====
4 May 2016	**Galatasaray**	**0–0**	**Çaykur Rizespor**	Istanbul
20.45				Stadium: Türk Telekom Arena

5 May 2016	**Fenerbahçe**	**2–0**	**Konyaspor**	Istanbul
20.45

== Final ==
The final was contested in Antalya as a one-off match. The winning club, Galatasaray, was awarded 50 medals club along with the Turkish Cup trophy.

26 May 2016 Final	Galatasaray	1–0	Fenerbahçe	Antalya
21:15 EEST (UTC+03)	Podolski 31'	Report (in Turkish)		Stadium: Antalya Stadium; Attendance: 32,539; Referee: Mete Kalkavan; Man of the Match: Podolski
