= 2024 Turkish Super Cup =

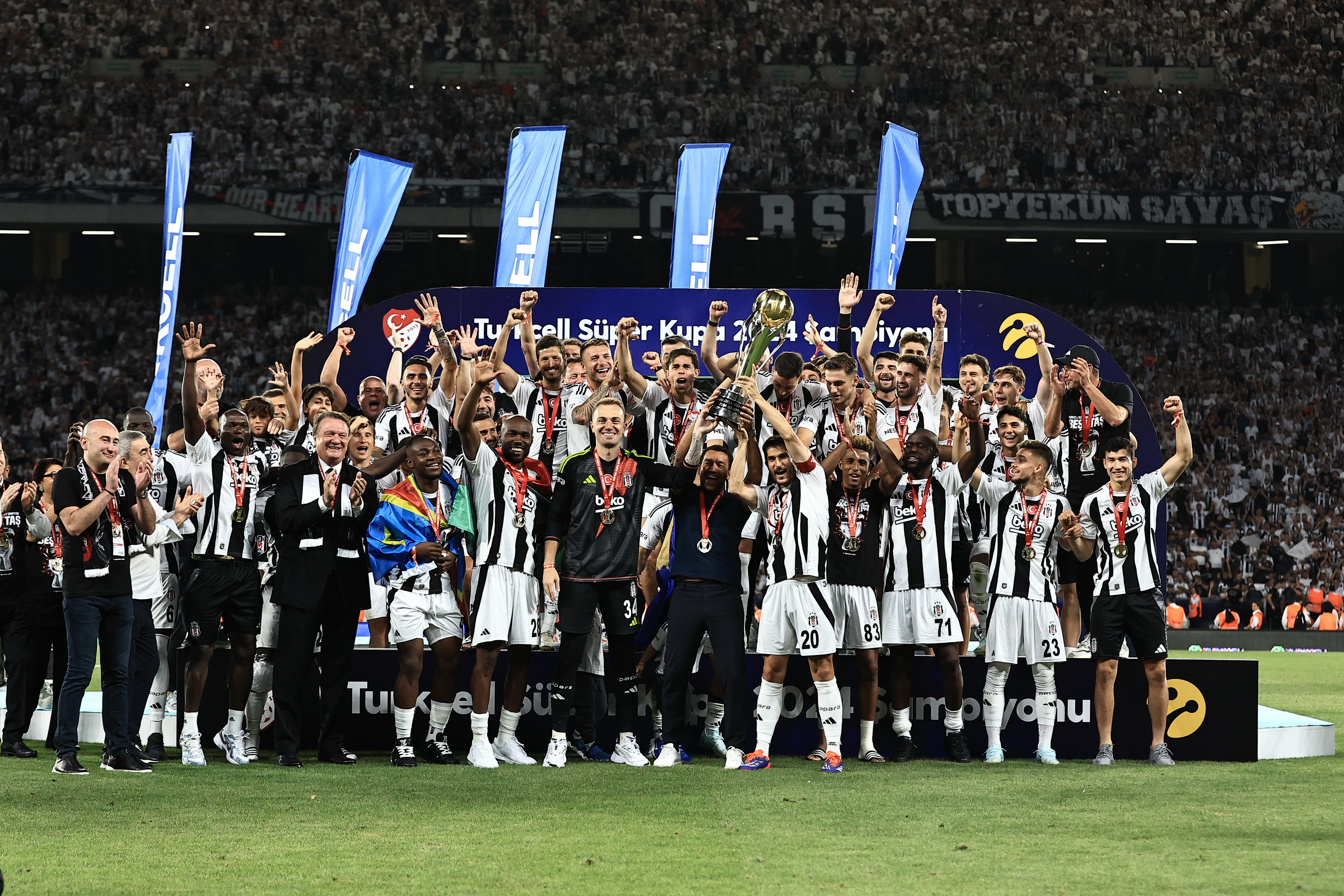
- Beşiktaş players and van Bronckhorst celebrate with the trophy
- Event: Turkish Super Cup
Galatasaray	Beşiktaş
0	5
- Date: 3 August 2024
- Venue: Atatürk Olympic Stadium, Istanbul
- Man of the Match: Ciro Immobile (Beşiktaş)
- Referee: Atilla Karaoğlan
- Attendance: 70,847

The 2024 Turkish Super Cup, or the 2024 Turkcell Super Cup (Turkish: 2024 Turkcell Süper Kupa) for sponsorship reasons, was the 51st edition of the Turkish Super Cup since its establishment as Presidential Cup in 1966, the annual Turkish football match contested by the winners of the previous season's top league and cup competitions (or cup runner-up in case the league- and cup-winning club is the same). The game was played on 3 August 2024 between Galatasaray and Beşiktaş. The venue was the Atatürk Olympic Stadium in Istanbul, Turkey.

Beşiktaş won the match 5–0, making this the largest margin of victory ever in a Turkish Super Cup match, as well as the club's joint-largest win against their city rivals.

== Teams ==
Team	Qualification	Previous participations (bold indicates winners)
Galatasaray	Winners of the 2023–24 Süper Lig	26 (**1966**, **1969**, 1971, **1972**, 1973, 1976, **1982**, 1985, **1987**, **1988**, **1991**, **1993**, 1994, **1996**, **1997**, 1998, 2006, **2008**, **2012**, **2013**, 2014, **2015**, **2016**, 2018, **2019**, **2023**)
Beşiktaş	Winners of the 2023–24 Turkish Cup	21 (**1966**, 1967, **1974**, 1975, 1977, 1982, **1986**, **1989**, 1990, 1991, **1992**, 1993, **1994**, 1995, **1998**, **2006**, 2007, 2009, 2016, 2017, **2021**)

== Match ==
=== Details ===
3 August 2024
20:45 TRT (UTC+3)

Galatasaray	0–5	Beşiktaş
	Report	Immobile 1', 81' (pen.); Svensson 53'; Silva 90+1'; Hekimoğlu 90+2'

Atatürk Olympic Stadium, Istanbul
Attendance: 70,847
Referee: Atilla Karaoğlan

**Galatasaray**	**Beşiktaş**

GK	1	(Uruguay) Fernando Muslera (c)
RB	23	(Turkey) Kaan Ayhan
CB	42	(Turkey) Abdülkerim Bardakcı
CB	25	(Denmark) Victor Nelsson	(red card) 87'
LB	17	(Germany) Derrick Köhn
DM	34	(Uruguay) Lucas Torreira	(yellow card) 20'	(substituted off) 75'
DM	18	(Turkey) Berkan Kutlu	(yellow card) 17'	(substituted off) 58'
RW	22	(Morocco) Hakim Ziyech		(substituted off) 58'
AM	10	(Belgium) Dries Mertens		(substituted off) 46'
LW	7	(Turkey) Kerem Aktürkoğlu	(yellow card) 42'	(substituted off) 46'
CF	9	(Argentina) Mauro Icardi
Substitutes:
GK	19	(Turkey) Günay Güvenç
DF	6	(Colombia) Davinson Sánchez
DF	15	(France) Léo Dubois
DF	90	(Turkey) Metehan Baltacı
MF	8	(Germany) Kerem Demirbay		(substituted on) 58'
MF	30	(Austria) Yusuf Demir
FW	11	(Turkey) Yunus Akgün		(substituted on) 58'
FW	14	(Ivory Coast) Wilfried Zaha		(substituted on) 75'
FW	44	(Belgium) Michy Batshuayi		(substituted on) 46'
FW	53	(Turkey) Barış Alper Yılmaz	(yellow card) 73'	(substituted on) 46'
Manager:
(Turkey) Okan Buruk

GK	34	(Turkey) Mert Günok (c)
RB	2	(Norway) Jonas Svensson
CB	3	(Brazil) Gabriel Paulista
CB	6	(The Gambia) Omar Colley	(yellow card) 11'
LB	26	(Democratic Republic of the Congo) Arthur Masuaku
DM	28	(Libya) Al-Musrati
DM	83	(Portugal) Gedson Fernandes	(yellow card) 73'	(substituted off) 90'
RW	7	(Kosovo) Milot Rashica		(substituted off) 85'
AM	27	(Portugal) Rafa Silva
LW	9	(Turkey) Semih Kılıçsoy	(yellow card) 20'	(substituted off) 67'
CF	17	(Italy) Ciro Immobile	(yellow card) 47'	(substituted off) 85'
Substitutes:
GK	30	(Turkey) Ersin Destanoğlu
DF	4	(Turkey) Onur Bulut		(substituted on) 85'
DF	5	(Turkey) Tayyip Talha Sanuç
MF	8	(Turkey) Salih Uçan		(substituted on) 90'
MF	20	(Turkey) Necip Uysal
MF	21	(Turkey) Demir Ege Tıknaz
MF	23	(Albania) Ernest Muçi
MF	71	(Cameroon) Jean Onana		(substituted on) 67'
FW	40	(Democratic Republic of the Congo) Jackson Muleka
FW	91	(Turkey) Mustafa Erhan Hekimoğlu		(substituted on) 85'
Manager:
(Netherlands) Giovanni van Bronckhorst

Man of the Match:
Ciro Immobile (Beşiktaş)

Assistant referees:
Abdullah Bora Özkara
Volkan Ahmet Narinç
Fourth official:
Mehmet Türkmen
Video assistant referee:
Mustafa İlker Coşkun
Assistant video assistant referees:
Ceyhun Sesigüzel
Onur Özütoprak

**Match rules**

- 90 minutes
- 30 minutes of extra time if necessary
- Penalty shoot-out if scores still level
- Ten named substitutes
- Maximum of five substitutions, with a sixth allowed in extra time (Note: Each team was given only three opportunities to make substitutions, with a fourth opportunity in extra time, excluding substitutions made at half-time, before the start of extra time and at half-time in extra time.)
