= 1967 Presidential Cup =

- Event: Turkish Super Cup
Beşiktaş	Altay
1	0
- extra time
- Date: 30 June 1967
- Venue: Ankara 19 Mayıs Stadium, Ankara, Turkey

1967 Presidential Cup was the second edition of the national super cup of Turkish Football Federation. The match was contested between 1966–67 1.Lig champions Beşiktaş and 1966–67 Turkish Cup winners Altay.

== Match details ==
1967 Presidential Cup
30 June 1967
Final

Beşiktaş	1–0 (a.e.t.)	Altay
Karadoğan 102'	Report

Ankara 19 Mayıs Stadium, Ankara
Referee: (Turkey) Veli Necdet Arığ

Beşiktaş:
1	(Turkey) Necmi Mutlu
2	(Turkey) İhsan Büyükbuğdaypınar
3	(Turkey) Cevdet Çetinkaya
4	(Turkey) Fethi Türkeş
5	(Turkey) Süreyya Özkefe
6	(Turkey) Kaya Köstepen
7	(Turkey) Coşkun Ehlidil
8	(Turkey) Ahmet Özacar
9	(Turkey) Güven Önüt
10	(Turkey) Sanlı Sarıalioğlu
11	(Turkey) Faruk Karadoğan
Manager:
(Socialist Federal Republic of Yugoslavia) Ljubiša Spajić

Altay
1	(Turkey) Varol Ürkmez
2	(Turkey) Yılmaz Canlısoy
3	(Turkey) Zinnur Sarı
4	(Turkey) Enver Katip
5	(Turkey) Ali Rıza Şenol
6	(Turkey) Ayfer Elmastaşoğlu
7	(Turkey) Metin Kurt
8	(Turkey) Aytekin Erhanoğlu
9	(Turkey) Feridun Öztürk
10	(Turkey) Mahmut Evren
11	(Turkey) Aydın Yelken
Manager:
(Turkey) Halil Bıçakçı

Assistant referees:
(Turkey) Mazhar Kerestecioğlu
(Turkey) Macit Sarıdana

== See also ==
- 1966–67 1.Lig
- 1966–67 Turkish Cup
