= Yasin Öztekin =

Turkish footballer

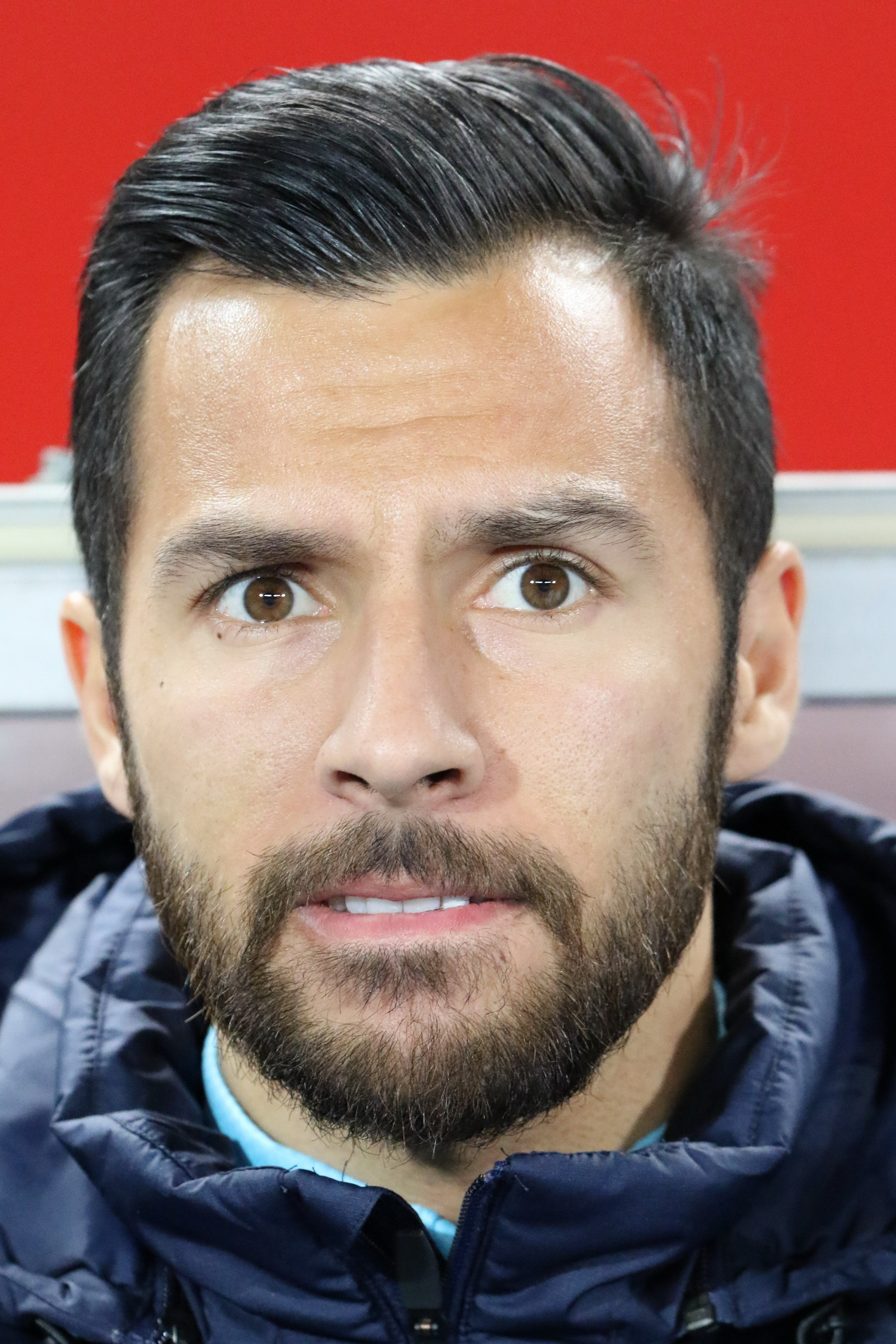
- Öztekin in 2016

Personal information
- Date of birth: 19 March 1987 (age 39)
- Place of birth: Dortmund, West Germany
- Height: 1.79 m (5 ft 10 in)
- Position: Winger

Team information
- Current team: Bucaspor 1928
- Number: 9

Youth career
- 1994–1996: Alemannia Scharnhorst
- 1996–2006: Borussia Dortmund

Senior career*
Years	Team	Apps	(Gls)
2006–2010	Borussia Dortmund II	110	(17)
2008–2009	Borussia Dortmund	1	(0)
2011–2012	Gençlerbirliği	50	(8)
2012–2013	Trabzonspor	26	(3)
2013–2014	Kayseri Erciyesspor	28	(6)
2014–2018	Galatasaray	99	(23)
2018–2019	Göztepe	34	(8)
2020–2021	Sivasspor	26	(1)
2021–2022	Samsunspor	46	(18)
2022–2023	Göztepe	24	(8)
2023–	Bucaspor 1928	4	(0)

International career^{‡}
2015–2016	Turkey	6	(0)
- * Club domestic league appearances and goals as of 23 September 2023 ‡ National team caps and goals as of 9 October 2016

Yasin Öztekin (Turkish pronunciation: [ˈjaːsin ˈœztecin]; born 19 March 1987) is a Turkish professional football player who plays as a winger for Bucaspor 1928. He has previously played in Borussia Dortmund's academy and youth teams.

== Club career ==
=== Borussia Dortmund ===
Oztekin played his youth career in Borussia Dortmund II from 2006 to 2010. During the 2010–11 season he was offered a role in the A squad but later was sent to the youth team of Dortmund.

=== Gençlerbirliği ===
On 5 January 2011, Öztekin signed a deal with Gençlerbirliği for 21 years on a free transfer. On 12 January 2011, he played his first game in the campaign's against Bucaspor and on 16 January 2011 he scored an own goal in the campaign's against Yeni Malatyaspor. Öztekin played 50 games in 1.5 years and scored 8 league goals, which later attracted bigger clubs to target him in the transfer market.

=== Trabzonspor ===
On 22 May 2012, Öztekin signed a four-year deal with Trabzonspor on a free transfer. While playing for Trabzonspor he played 23 games and scored only 3 goals during 2012–13 Turkish Super League season.

=== Kayseri Erciyesspor ===
On 22 July 2013, Öztekin was sent to Kayseri Erciyesspor for a fee of €417 and signed a contract for three years. During that season Yasin had played 28 league matches and was able to score 6 goals.

=== Galatasaray ===
On 9 August 2014, Öztekin was sold to the Turkish club Galatasaray for a fee of €2.5 million and signed a contract for four years. On 21 February 2015, he scored a goal in the 9th minute against Sivasspor. On 5 April 2015, he scored his second goal of the season against Kardemir Karabükspor. On 12 May 2015, Öztekin scored a goal in the 16th minute winning over Mersin İdman Yurdu. On 24 May 2015, he scored a critical goal in the 11th minute against Beşiktaş, which led to the win over Besiktas and securing the 2014–15 Süper Lig title.

== International career ==
On 8 June 2015, Öztekin made his international debut for Turkey in a 4–0 home friendly win against Bulgaria. He played the first half before being substituted for his club teammate Selçuk İnan.

== Honours ==
Galatasaray

- Süper Lig: 2014–15, 2017–18
- Türkiye Kupası: 2014–15, 2015–16
- Süper Kupa: 2015, 2016
