= Sabri Dino =

Turkish footballer (1942–1990)

Personal information
- Date of birth: 1 January 1942
- Place of birth: Istanbul, Turkey
- Date of death: 14 January 1990
- Place of death: Istanbul, Turkey
- Height: 1.80 m (5 ft 11 in)
- Position: Goalkeeper

Youth career
- Tarabya SK
- Galatasaray
- İzmir Denizgücü SK

Senior career*
Years	Team	Apps	(Gls)
1963–1964	Beyoğluspor	28	(0)
1964–1975	Beşiktaş	201	(0)
Total		229	(0)

International career
1959	Turkey U18	2	(0)
1965–1969	Turkey U21	5	(0)
1969–1975	Turkey	12	(0)
- * Club domestic league appearances and goals

Sabri Dino (1 January 1942 – 14 January 1990) was a Turkish professional footballer. During his career, he prominently played for Beşiktaş J.K. and he also represented Turkey at international level. Spent 11 seasons at Beşiktaş until his retirement, Sabri Dino was a decorated player, winning titles of 1. Lig twice, Turkish Cup and President Cup once.

== Club career ==
Sabri Dino started his career at age of 14 at Tarabya S.K. in Tarabya, Istanbul. After Tarabyaspor, he had respective spells Galatasaray youth division and Denizgücü Spor Kulübü where he rose to fame before he enrolled for mandatory duty at Army. Fulfilled his duty, he joined Beyoğluspor at 1963–64 season.

Following the departure of Özcan Arkoç to Austria Wien in 1964, Beşiktaş signed Dino following a transfer contention with Fenerbahçe. Initially, becoming a rotational keeper behind the first choice keeper Necmi Mutlu, Dino became a regular keeper by 1967–68 season.

On 13 August 1980, arbitrated by World Cup referee Doğan Babacan, Dino's testimonial was held between Beşiktaş and Galatasaray in which he was replaced by Mete Bozkurt on 10th minute where game ended 1–1, eventually.

== International career ==
Represented Turkey total of 19 times at different age categories, Dino capped for Turkey 12 times at senior level between 1969 and 1975.

== Style of play ==
Dino is described as a "modern goalkeeper" with skills of aerial ability, positioning and anticipation.

== Personal life ==
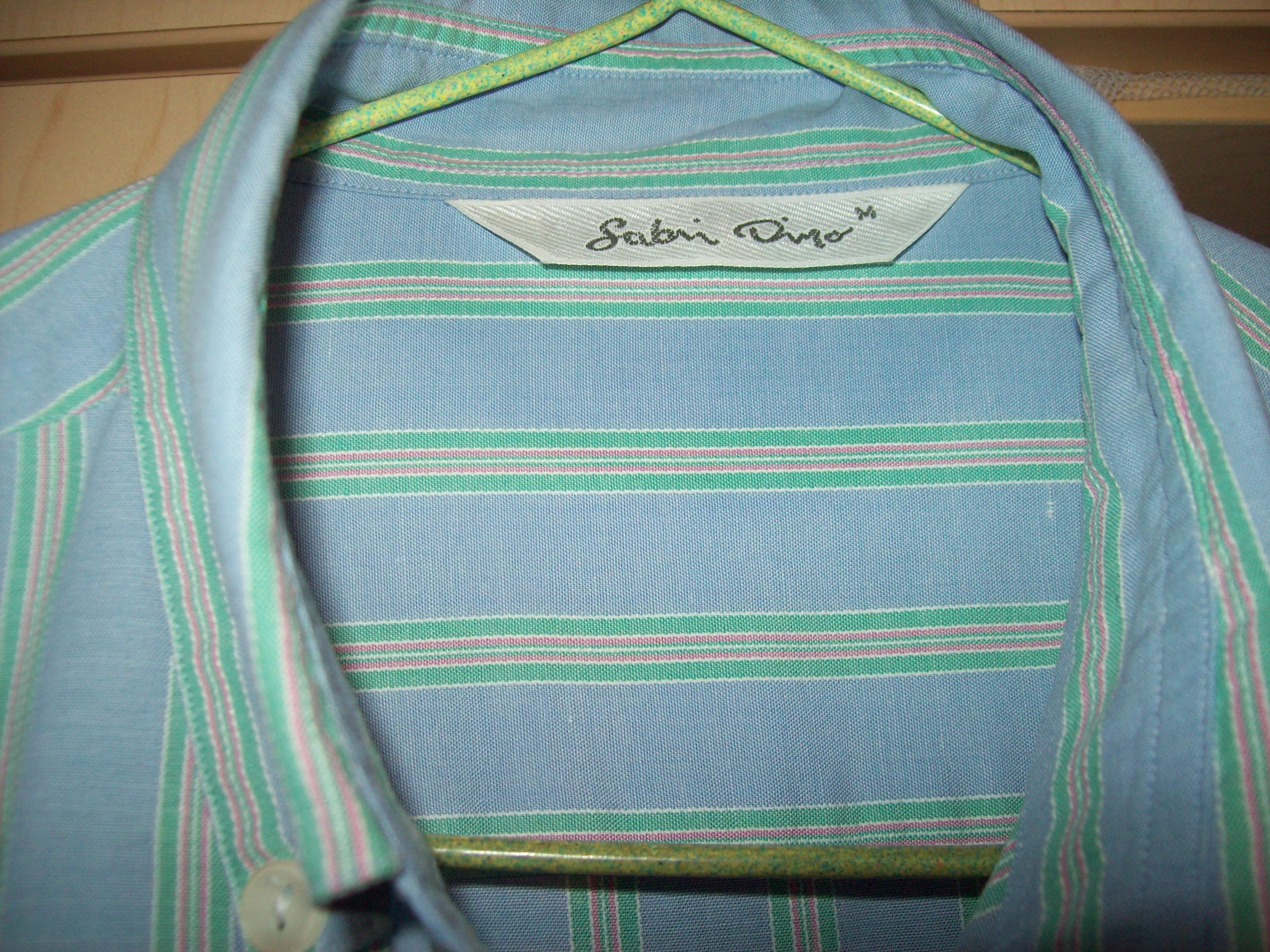
A men's shirt of Sabri Dino brand

Sabri Dino is nephew of renowned Turkish painter Abidin Dino. He attended Deutsche Schule Istanbul in Beyoğlu for high school education.

Following his retirement, he entered in textile business in men's clothing. However, his business suffered exchange rate fluctuations and he eventually bankrupted. Following reported economical challenges, Sabri Dino committed suicide at Beylerbeyi abutment of Boğaziçi Bridge on 14 January 1990, Sunday. He was married with Meral Dino, with two sons, Murat and Cem.

Dino was also a member of Executive Committee of Turkish Football Federation in 1986, during presidency Erdenay Oflaz.

Turkish author Sunay Akın dedicated his 2018-released goalkeepers-related book Kalede 1 Başına to Sabri Dino.

== Honours ==
Beşiktaş

- 1. Lig: 1965–66, 1966–67
- Turkish Cup: 1974–75
- President Cup:
- TSYD Cup: 1966, 1972

Turkey

- RCD Cup: 1969, 1974

Individual

- Beşiktaş J.K. Squads of Century (Golden Team)

== Bibliography ==
Books

- Durupınar, Mehmet (2002). Beşiktaş Tarihi İlkleriyle Unutulmayanlarıyla Yüzüncü Yılında (in Turkish). Istanbul: Yapı Kredi Yayınları. ISBN 975-080-456-2.
- Yüce, Mehmet (2016). Romantik Yürekler: Futbol Tarihimizin Yeni Devreleri: 1952-1992 Türkiye Futbol Tarihi 3. Cilt (in Turkish). Istanbul: İletişim Yayınları. ISBN 9789750519932.
