= Demir Ege Tıknaz =

Turkish footballer

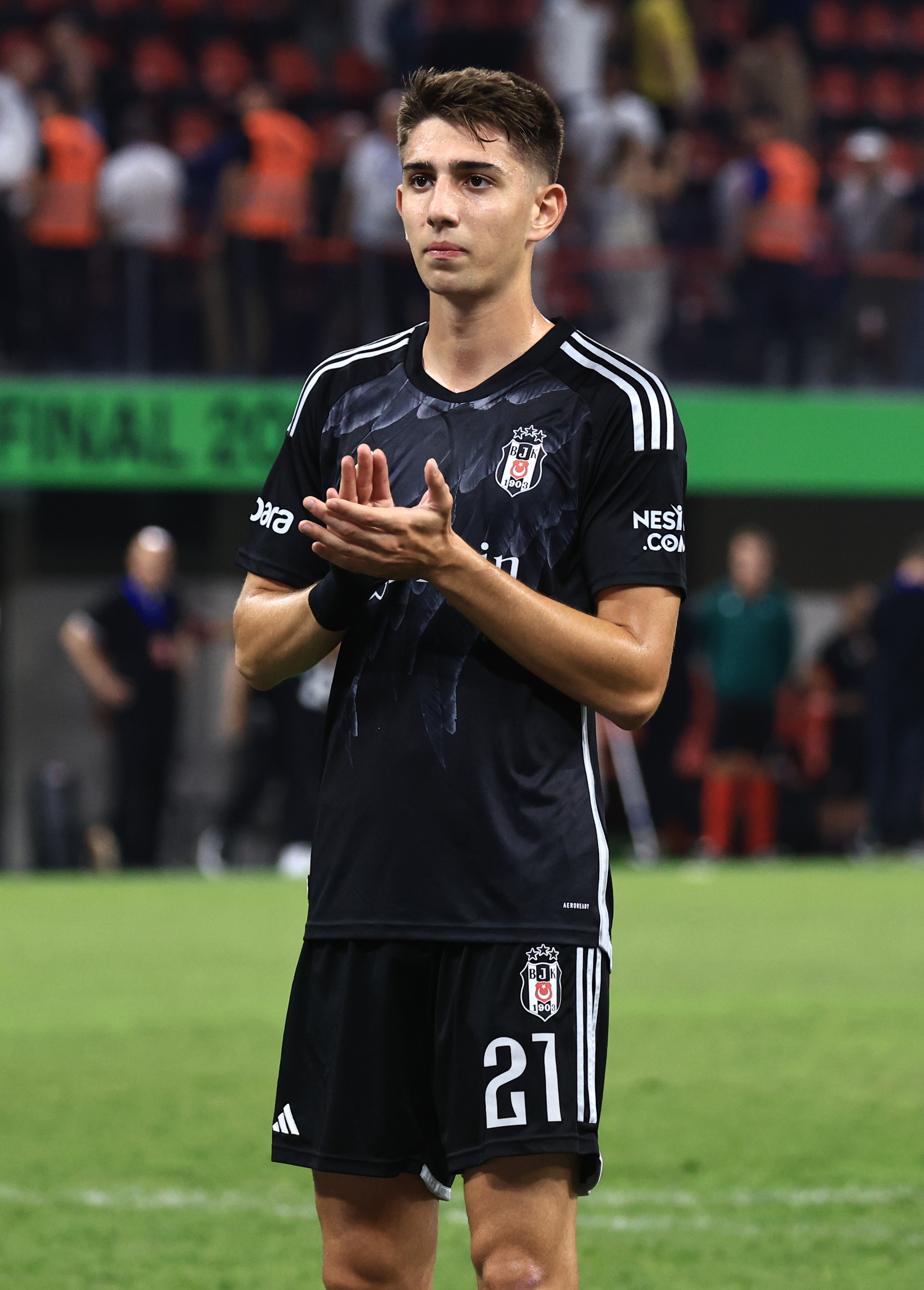
- Tıknaz with Beşiktaş in 2024

Personal information
- Date of birth: 17 August 2004 (age 22)
- Place of birth: Kadıköy, Turkey
- Height: 1.93 m (6 ft 4 in)
- Position: Midfielder

Team information
- Current team: Braga
- Number: 34

Youth career
- 2014–2023: Beşiktaş

Senior career*
Years	Team	Apps	(Gls)
2021–2026	Beşiktaş	31	(0)
2024–2025	→ Rio Ave (loan)	28	(4)
2026–	Braga	17	(0)

International career^{‡}
2018	Turkey U14	2	(0)
2022	Turkey U18	4	(0)
2023	Turkey U19	3	(0)
2023–	Turkey U21	8	(0)
2025–	Turkey	4	(0)
- * Club domestic league appearances and goals as of 19 October 2026 ‡ National team caps and goals as of 2 October 2026

Demir Ege Tıknaz (born 17 August 2004) is a Turkish professional footballer who plays as a midfielder for Primeira Liga club Braga and the Turkey national team.

== Club career ==
=== Beşiktaş (2023–2026) ===
Tıknaz started his career with Turkish top flight side Beşiktaş. On 27 July 2023, he made his professional debut in a continental game, in UEFA Conference League match against Albanian Kategoria Superiore team Tirana, as a late substitute in 3-1 home win.

On 20 August 2023, he made his Süper Lig debut against Pendikspor, a 1-1 home draw. On 16 January 2024, he made his Turkish Cup debut as a starter against TFF 1. Lig team Eyüpspor, in a 4-0 home victory.

==== Loan to Rio Ave (2024–2025) ====
On 2 September 2024, Tıknaz was loaned to Portuguese club Rio Ave until the end of the season. On 21 September 2024, he made his debut with the team in an away Primeira Liga match against GD Estoril, as a late substitute in 2-2 draw.

On 19 October 2024, he made his Taça de Portugal debut as a substitute against Liga 3 team Atlético CP.

==== Return to Beşiktaş ====
On 3 July 2025, he signed a new three-year contract with Beşiktaş. On 24 July 2025, he made his UEFA Europa League debut as a starter against Ukrainian Premier League club Shaktar Donetsk, in a 2-4 home lost.

On 14 August 2025, he scored his first goal for the club in a 3–2 victory at home to St Patrick's Athletic in the UEFA Conference League third qualifying round rematch.

=== Braga (2026–present) ===
On 21 January 2026, Tıknaz joined Primeira Liga club Braga on a contract until June 2030, for a fee of €7 million, which could rise to €7.5 million with add-ons, and Beşiktaş keeping a 20% sell-on clause.

== International career ==
Tıknaz represented Turkey at under-14, under-18, under-19 and under-21 levels, for a total of seventeen caps.

On 14 March 2025, Tıknaz was called up by Vincenzo Montella to the Turkey national team for the 2024–25 UEFA Nations League promotion/relegation play-offs against Hungary.

He made his senior Turkey national team debut on 11 June 2025 in a friendly game against the Mexico national team.

== Career statistics ==
=== Club ===
As of match played 29 October 2026

Appearances and goals by club, season and competition
Club	Season	League			National cup (Note: Includes Turkish Cup and Taça de Portugal)		League cup (Note: Includes Taça da Liga)		Continental		Other		Total	
Club	Season	Division	Apps	Goals	Apps	Goals	Apps	Goals	Apps	Goals	Apps	Goals	Apps	Goals
Beşiktaş	2023–24	Süper Lig	21	0	1	0	—		7 (Note: Appearance(s) in the UEFA Conference League)	0	—		29	0
Beşiktaş	2025–26	Süper Lig	10	0	2	0	—		5 (Note: 2 appearances in the UEFA Europa League; 3 appearances & 1 goal in the UEFA Conference League)	1	—		17	1
Beşiktaş	Total		31	0	3	0	0	0	12	1	0	0	46	1
Rio Ave (loan)	2024–25	Primeira Liga	28	4	5	0	0	0	—		—		33	4
Braga	2025–26	Primeira Liga	10	0	0	0	0	0	4 (Note: Appearances in UEFA Europa League)	1	—		14	1
Braga	2026–27	Primeira Liga	6	0	1	0	0	0	8	0	—		15	0
Braga	Total		16	0	1	0	0	0	12	1	—		29	1
Career total			75	4	9	0	0	0	24	2	0	0	108	6

=== International ===
As of 2 October 2026

Appearances and goals by national team and year
National team	Year	Apps	Goals
Turkey	2025	1	0
Turkey	2026	3	0
Total		4	0

== Honours ==
Beşiktaş

- Turkish Cup: 2023–24
- Turkish Super Cup: 2024
