= 1966 Presidential Cup =

- Event: Turkish Super Cup
Beşiktaş	Galatasaray
0	2
- Date: 21 September 1966
- Venue: Ankara 19 Mayıs Stadium, Ankara, Turkey
- Referee: Sebahattin Ladikli
- Attendance: 33,583
- Weather: Fine

1966 Presidential Cup was the inaugural edition of the national super cup of Turkish Football Federation. The match was contested between 1965–66 1.Lig champions Beşiktaş and 1965–66 Turkish Cup winners Galatasaray. It was held on an unusual time for a super cup, in September, after the footballing season for 1966–67 1.Lig began.

== Match details ==
1966 Presidential Cup
21 September 1966
20:00 EEST
Final

Beşiktaş	0–2	Galatasaray
		T. Doğangün 10'; A. Elmastaşoğlu 13'

Ankara 19 Mayıs Stadium, Ankara
Attendance: 33,583
Referee: Sebahattin Ladikli (Turkey)

Beşiktaş:
1	(Turkey) Sabri Dino	(substituted off) 46'
2	(Turkey) Erkan Yanardağ
3	(Socialist Federal Republic of Yugoslavia) Milonja Kaličanin
4	(Turkey) Kaya Köstepen
5	(Turkey) Fehmi Sağınoğlu
6	(Turkey) Sami Şenol
7	(Turkey) Cevdet Çetinkaya
8	(Turkey) Ahmet Özacar
9	(Turkey) Coşkun Ehlidil
10	(Turkey) Ahmet Şahin
11	(Turkey) Fethi Türkeş
Substitutions:
(Turkey) Necmi Mutlu	(substituted on) 46'
Manager:
(Socialist Federal Republic of Yugoslavia) Ljubiša Spajić

Galatasaray:
1	(Turkey) Bülent Gürbüz
2	(Turkey) Tuncer İnceler
3	(Turkey) Mustafa Yürür
4	(Turkey) Ahmet Tuna Kozan
5	(Turkey) Bahri Altıntabak
6	(Turkey) Ergün Acuner
7	(Turkey) Ayhan Elmastaşoğlu
8	(Turkey) Turan Doğangün
9	(Turkey) Yılmaz Gökdel
10	(Turkey) Metin Oktay
11	(Turkey) Uğur Köken
Manager:
(Turkey) Gündüz Kılıç

Assistant referees:
(Turkey) Hamza Özdağ
(Turkey) Nevzat Tansuk

== See also ==
- 1965–66 1.Lig
- 1965–66 Turkish Cup
