= Süreyya =

Süreyya is a Turkish given name. Notable people with this name include:

- Süreyya Ağaoğlu (1903–1989), Turkish writer, jurist, and the first female lawyer in Turkish history
- Şevket Süreyya Aydemir (1897–1976), Turkish intellectual, and a founder of the journal Kadro
- Süreyya Ayhan (born 1978), Turkish middle-distance track runner
- Süreyyya Evren (born 1972), Turkish writer working on literature, contemporary art, and radical politics
- Sırrı Süreyya Önder (1962–2025), Turkish film director, actor, screenwriter, columnist and politician
- Süreyya Özkefe (1939–2025), Turkish footballer
- Süreyya Serdengeçti (1952–2025), Turkish economist and Governor of the Central Bank of Turkey

== See also ==
- Süreyya Opera House, opera hall in Kadıköy district of Istanbul, Turkey
- Süreyya (film), a 1972 film
