= 2015 Turkish Super Cup =

- Event: Turkish Super Cup
| Galatasaray | Bursaspor |
| 1 | 0 |
- Date: 8 August 2015
- Venue: Osmanlı Stadyumu, Ankara
- Man of the Match: Yasin Öztekin
- Referee: Cüneyt Çakır
- Attendance: 19,626
- Weather: Fine

2015 Turkish Super Cup (Turkish: TFF Süper Kupa) is the 42nd edition of the Turkish Super Cup since its establishment as Presidential Cup in 1966. The match is contested between both the 2014–15 Süper Lig and 2014–15 Turkish Cup champions Galatasaray and the 2014–15 Turkish Cup runner-up Bursaspor.

== Background ==
The fixture is the 6th overall national super cup matchup between the teams since 1966. Galatasaray last won the cup in 2013 against Fenerbahçe, and Bursaspor never won the cup since 1966, but they were finalist in 2010.

== Path to the final ==
Galatasaray were champions in the regular season, finishing 3 points ahead of Fenerbahçe. In the regular season Galatasaray collected 77 points by 24 wins, 5 draws, and 5 losses. They were trailed by Fenerbahçe, who collected 74 points by 22 wins, 8 draws, and 4 losses.

Bursaspor performed better in the domestic cup. They entered the tournament at the third round. They won their third round match against Tepecikspor. In the group stage they were drawn against Mersin İdmanyurdu, Fatih Karagümrük, and Samsunspor but were first position in the group. In the round of 16, they beat İstanbul Başakşehir. They won their quarter final match against Gençlerbirliği. The semi-finals were the toughest home and away matches for Bursaspor, as they struggled against Fenerbahçe S.K. (football) but were winners. In the 2015 Turkish Cup Final, Galatasaray defeated Bursaspor, but Bursaspor gained a ticket for Turkish Super Cup final, since Galatasaray is the champion of the league.

== Match ==
=== Details ===
8 August 2015
20:30 EEST (UTC+03)

| Galatasaray | 1–0 | Bursaspor |
|---|---|---|
| Öztekin 27' |

Osmanlı Stadyumu, Ankara
Attendance: 19,626
Referee: Cüneyt Çakır

| Galatasaray | Bursaspor |

| GK | 1 | (Uruguay) Fernando Muslera |
| DF | 13 | (Brazil) Alex Telles |
| DF | 22 | (Turkey) Hakan Balta |
| DF | 21 | (Cameroon) Aurélien Chedjou |
| DF | 55 | (Turkey) Sabri Sarıoğlu |
| MF | 5 | (Turkey) Bilal Kısa |
| MF | 7 | (Turkey) Yasin Öztekin | (yellow card) 35' |
| MF | 8 | (Turkey) Selçuk İnan (c) | (yellow card) 52' |
| MF | 10 | (Netherlands) Wesley Sneijder | | (substituted off) 77' |
| FW | 11 | (Germany) Lukas Podolski | (yellow card) 80' | (substituted off) 84' |
| FW | 17 | (Turkey) Burak Yılmaz | | (substituted off) 63' |
Substitutes:
| GK | 67 | (Turkey) Eray İşcan |
| DF | 28 | (Turkey) Koray Günter |
| DF | 38 | (Turkey) Tarık Çamdal |
| MF | 6 | (Turkey) Jem Paul Karacan | | (substituted on) 84' |
| MF | 29 | (Turkey) Olcan Adın |
| MF | 52 | (Turkey) Emre Çolak | (red card) 88' | (substituted on) 63' |
| FW | 9 | (Turkey) Umut Bulut | | (substituted on) 77' |
Manager:
(Turkey) Hamza Hamzaoğlu

| GK | 17 | (Turkey) Mert Günok |
| DF | 4 | (Turkey) Serdar Aziz |
| DF | 22 | (Turkey) Erdem Özgenç |
| DF | 23 | (Australia) Aziz Behich | | (substituted off) 71' |
| DF | 66 | (Czech Republic) Tomáš Sivok |
| MF | 3 | (Turkey) Emre Taşdemir |
| MF | 6 | (Turkey) Şamil Çinaz |
| MF | 7 | (Turkey) Ozan Tufan |
| MF | 10 | (Portugal) Josué Pesqueira |
| MF | 14 | (Chile) Cristóbal Jorquera | | (substituted off) 72' |
| FW | 94 | (Democratic Republic of the Congo) Cédric Bakambu |
Substitutes:
| GK | 1 | (Turkey) Harun Tekin |
| DF | 13 | (Cameroon) Dany Nounkeu |
| DF | 82 | (Peru) Luis Advíncula | | (substituted on) 72' |
| MF | 5 | (Turkey) Bekir Yılmaz |
| MF | 11 | (Turkey) Furkan Soyalp |
| MF | 20 | (Turkey) Aydın Karabulut |
| MF | 33 | (Turkey) Ozan İpek | (yellow card) 90+4' | (substituted on) 71' |
Manager:
(Turkey) Ertuğrul Sağlam
