= 2011 Turkish Super Cup =

- Event: Turkish Super Cup
| Fenerbahçe | Beşiktaş |
- Date: Cancelled
- Venue: Universiade Arena, Erzurum

TFF Süper Kupa 2011 should have been the 39th edition of the Turkish Super Cup since its establishment as Presidential Cup in 1966. The match was going to be contested between the 2010–11 Süper Lig champions Fenerbahçe and the 2010–11 Turkish Cup winners Beşiktaş. The match was to be played on 31 July 2011 but the TFF postponed but was cancelled after the match fixing scandal investigations. This would have been the first Turkish Super Cup final to be hosted by the Erzurum Universiade Arena.

On 27 December 2021, Istanbul 13th High Criminal Court acquitted Fenerbahçe executives Aziz Yıldırım, Şekip Mosturoğlu, İlhan Ekşioğlu and others, which made the issue of replaying the match moot on Fenerbahçe side and they posted an announcement about their application to the Turkish Football Federation on 30 December. On Beşiktaş side, Emre Karadağ, Beşiktaş deputy chairman, declared that they would be willing to compete. The Turkish Football Federation president Nihat Özdemir said that its board would consider the issue, and that he supported the idea of replaying the match.

== Background ==
This was to be the 7th overall national super cup matchup between the teams since 1966, and the 3rd matchup since 2006, when the cup was rebranded as TFF Süper Kupa. Fenerbahçe won the final in 2007 and 2009 against Beşiktaş, while Beşiktaş was yet to win their 2nd TFF Süper Kupa since their victory in the inaugural tournament. Also, both teams created a pattern, playing against each other in every other odd year.

== Path to the final ==
Fenerbahçe were champions by 26 wins, 4 draws and 4 losses, collecting 82 points overall. They were trailed by Trabzonspor, which collected the same number of points but came second due to head-to-head record. This also meant setting a new national record for Fenerbahçe, as they grabbed their record 18th title.

On the other hand, Beşiktaş finished fifth in the Süper Lig, but were more successful in the domestic cup. They won the playoff round against Mersin İdmanyurdu, and won the group stage by three wins and one loss. They eliminated quarter finalists Gaziantep B.B. and semi finalists Gaziantepspor. Beşiktaş won their ninth cup by a decisive penalty shootout against first time finalists İstanbul B.B.

== Request for the match to be played ==
On 18 December 2023, Fenerbahçe president Ali Koç visited the newly elected Beşiktaş president Hasan Arat at Tüpraş Stadium. They announced that they would apply for the 2011 Super Cup to be played.

== See also ==
- 2010–11 Süper Lig
- 2010–11 Turkish Cup
