= 2016 Turkish Super Cup =

- Event: Turkish Super Cup
Beşiktaş	Galatasaray
1	1
- After extra time Galatasaray won 3–0 on penalties
- Date: 13 August 2016
- Venue: Konya Metropolitan Municipality Stadium, Konya
- Referee: Mete Kalkavan
- Attendance: 33,700

The 2016 Turkish Super Cup (Turkish: TFF Süper Kupa) was the 43rd edition of the Turkish Super Cup since its establishment as Presidential Cup in 1966, the annual Turkish football season-opening match contested by the winners of the previous season's top league and cup competitions (or cup runner-up in case the league- and cup-winning club is the same). It took place on 13 August 2016 at the Konya Metropolitan Municipality Stadium in Konya, and was contested between Beşiktaş, the 2015–16 Süper Lig winners, and Galatasaray, the 2015–16 Turkish Cup winners.

Played in front of a crowd of 33,700, the Galatasaray defeated Beşiktaş 3–0 on penalties after 1–1 tie in 120 minutes. Galatasaray's victory marked their 15th Turkish Super Cup triumph.

== Match ==
=== Details ===
13 August 2016
20:45 EEST

Beşiktaş	1–1 (a.e.t.)	Galatasaray
Chedjou 107' (o.g.)	Report	Balta 100'
Penalties
Özyakup (penalty missed); Tosun (penalty missed); Hutchinson (penalty missed)	0–3	(penalty scored) İnan; (penalty scored) Balta; (penalty scored) Ciğerci

Konya Metropolitan Municipality Stadium, Konya
Attendance: 33,700
Referee: Mete Kalkavan

Beşiktaş	Galatasaray

GK	1	(Turkey) Tolga Zengin (c)
RB	32	(Germany) Andreas Beck	(yellow card) 58'
CB	30	(Brazil) Marcelo
CB	20	(Turkey) Necip Uysal	(yellow card) 99'	(substituted off) 105'
LB	6	(Serbia) Duško Tošić
DM	13	(Canada) Atiba Hutchinson
RM	21	(Turkey) Kerim Frei		(substituted off) 46'
CM	15	(Turkey) Oğuzhan Özyakup	(yellow card) 87'
CM	29	(Turkey) Tolgay Arslan		(substituted off) 73'
LM	10	(Turkey) Olcay Şahan
CF	23	(Turkey) Cenk Tosun
Substitutes:
GK	71	(Ukraine) Denys Boyko
DF	3	(Brazil) Adriano		(substituted on) 105'
DF	44	(Brazil) Rhodolfo
MF	5	(Argentina) José Sosa
MF	7	(Portugal) Ricardo Quaresma		(substituted on) 46'
MF	22	(Armenia) Aras Özbiliz
FW	17	(Turkey) Ömer Şişmanoğlu		(substituted on) 73'
Manager:
(Turkey) Şenol Güneş

GK	1	(Uruguay) Fernando Muslera
RB	15	(Norway) Martin Linnes
CB	21	(Cameroon) Aurélien Chedjou
CB	22	(Turkey) Hakan Balta (c)
LB	23	(France) Lionel Carole
CM	8	(Turkey) Selçuk İnan
CM	27	(Turkey) Tolga Ciğerci	(yellow card) 77'
RM	20	(Portugal) Bruma
AM	10	(Netherlands) Wesley Sneijder
LM	18	(Turkey) Sinan Gümüş		(substituted off) 88'
CF	11	(Germany) Lukas Podolski		(substituted off) 44'
Substitutes:
GK	19	(Turkey) Cenk Gönen
DF	4	(Turkey) Serdar Aziz
DF	55	(Turkey) Sabri Sarıoğlu
MF	5	(Turkey) Hamit Altıntop
MF	6	(Netherlands) Ryan Donk
MF	7	(Turkey) Yasin Öztekin		(substituted on) 88'
FW	9	(Switzerland) Eren Derdiyok		(substituted on) 44'
Manager:
(Netherlands) Jan Olde Riekerink
