= Necmi Mutlu =

Turkish footballer and manager

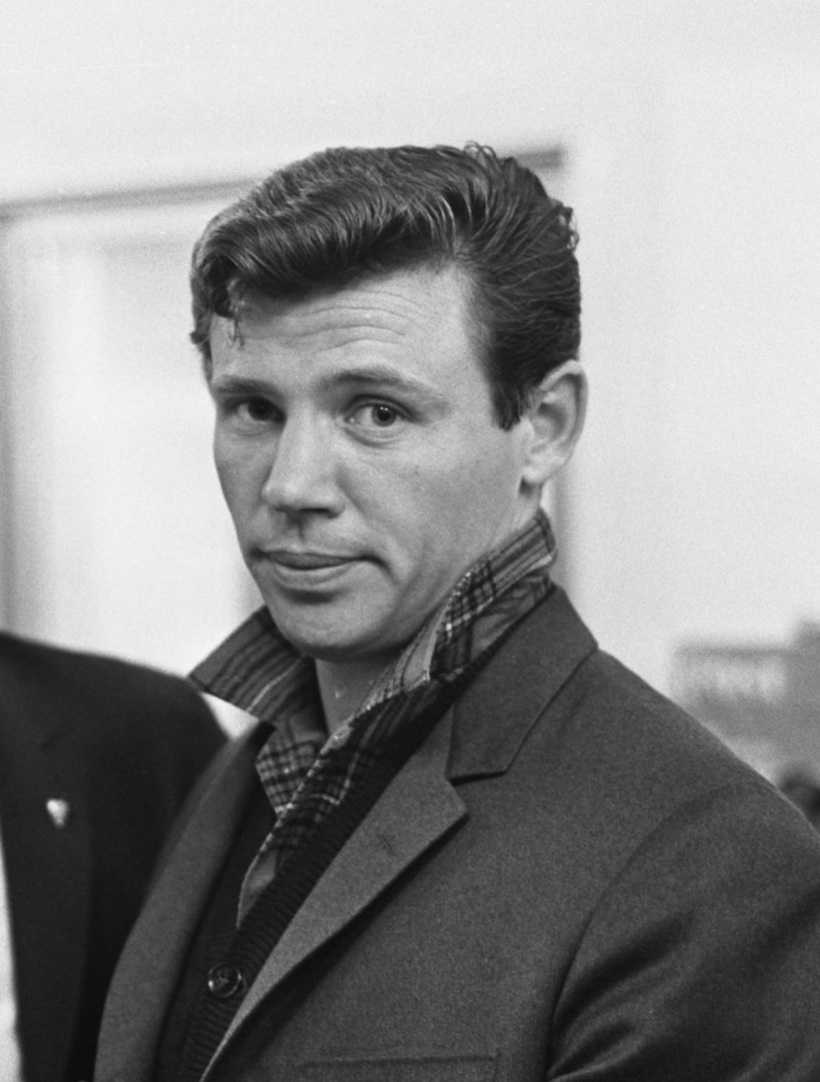
- Mutlu in 1966

Personal information
- Date of birth: 1 January 1937 (age 89)
- Place of birth: Istanbul
- Height: 1.77 m (5 ft 10 in)
- Position: Goalkeeper

Senior career*
Years	Team	Apps	(Gls)
1953–1955	Kadırga S.K.		
1955–1958	Beykozspor	48	(0)
1958–1970	Beşiktaş	241	(0)

International career
1958–1961	Turkey B	2	(0)
1961–1964	Turkey	5	(0)

Managerial career
- 1972: Beşiktaş (assistant)
- 1995–1996: Beşiktaş (goalkeeping coach)
- * Club domestic league appearances and goals

Necmi Mutlu (1 January 1937) is a Turkish former professional footballer and football manager. During his career, he prominently played for Beşiktaş and he also represented Turkey at international level. Mutlu spent 13 seasons at Beşiktaş until his retirement, winning the 1. Lig three times and the President Cup and Prime Minister's Cup once each.

Having played 241 games for the club, Multu holds the record for most appearances as a goalkeeper for Beşiktaş J.K.

== Honours ==
Beşiktaş

- 1. Lig: 1959–60, 1965–66, 1966–67
- Presidential Cup: 1967
- Prime Minister's Cup: 1974
- TSYD Cup: 1964–65, 1965–66

Individual

- Beşiktaş J.K. Squads of Century (Silver Team)
