= Fernando Muslera =

Uruguayan footballer (born 1986)

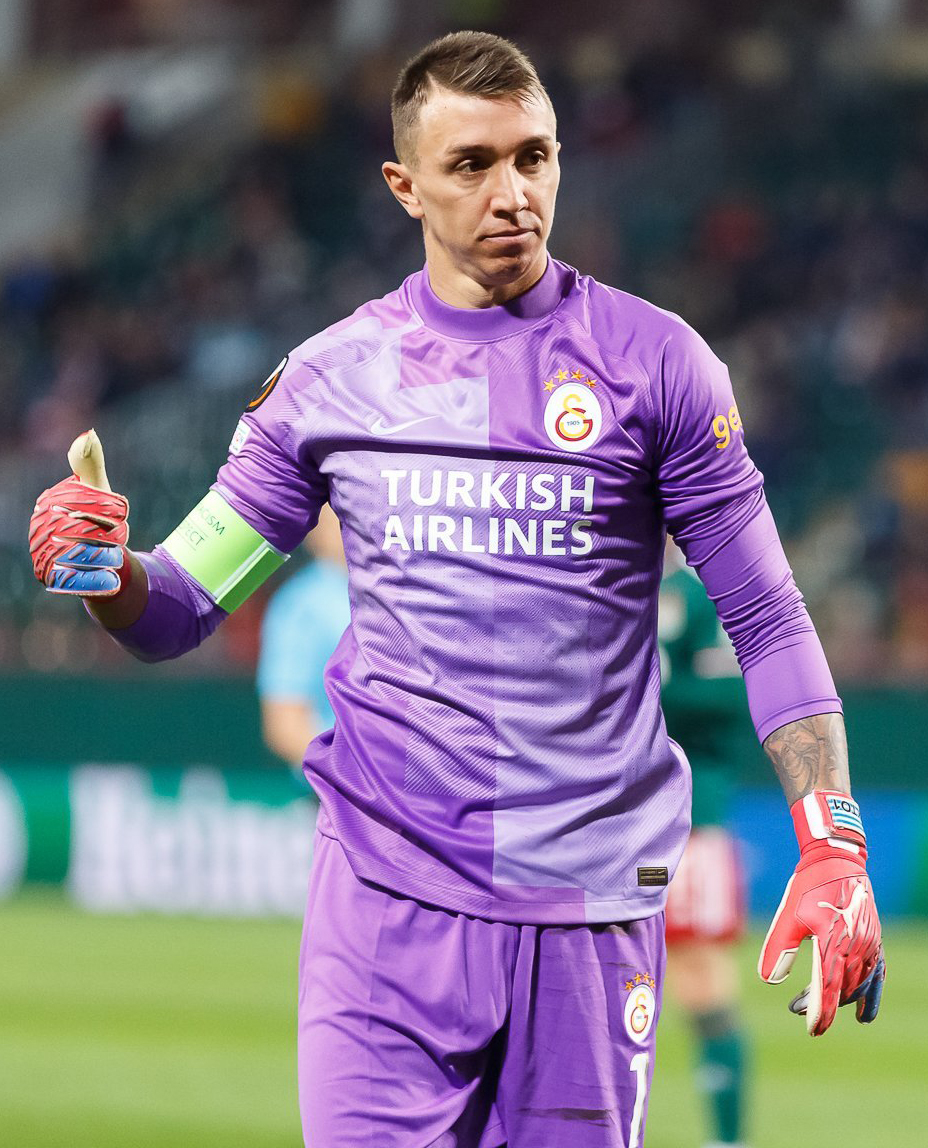
- Muslera with Galatasaray in 2021

Personal information
- Full name: Néstor Fernando Muslera Micol
- Date of birth: 16 June 1986 (age 40)
- Place of birth: Buenos Aires, Argentina
- Height: 1.90 m (6 ft 3 in)
- Position: Goalkeeper

Team information
- Current team: Estudiantes
- Number: 16

Youth career
- 2001–2004: Montevideo Wanderers

Senior career*
Years	Team	Apps	(Gls)
2004–2007	Montevideo Wanderers	44	(0)
2007	→ Nacional (loan)	5	(0)
2007–2011	Lazio	96	(0)
2011–2025	Galatasaray	443	(2)
2025–	Estudiantes	42	(0)

International career
2003	Uruguay U17	1	(0)
2004–2005	Uruguay U20	13	(0)
2009–2026	Uruguay	137	(0)
Medal record
Representing Uruguay
Men's football
Copa América
Winner	2011 Argentina
- * Club domestic league appearances and goals as of 17:26, 21 November 2026 (UTC)

Néstor Fernando Muslera Micol (Spanish: [feɾˈnando musˈleɾa]; born 16 June 1986) is a Uruguayan professional footballer who plays as a goalkeeper for AFA Liga Profesional de Fútbol club Estudiantes de La Plata.

Muslera began his career at Montevideo Wanderers and Nacional, before moving to Lazio in 2007 where he won the 2009 Coppa Italia. In 2011, he was signed by Galatasaray for a fee of around €7 million. He made 551 competitive appearances for the club, winning eight Süper Lig titles, five Turkish Cups and six Turkish Super Cups. He left the club in 2025, joining Estudiantes in Argentina, where he won the 2025 Clausura.

Between 2009 to 2026, Muslera earned 137 caps for the Uruguay national team. He represented Uruguay at five Copa América tournaments, winning the title in 2011. He also represented them at five FIFA World Cups, appearing at the 2010, 2014, 2018, 2022, and 2026 editions.

== Early life ==
Muslera was born in Buenos Aires, Argentina, on 16 June 1986, to Uruguayan parents working temporarily in the neighbouring country. He was born minutes after Argentina eliminated Uruguay from the last 16 of the 1986 FIFA World Cup and the obstetrician, unaware of his mother's nationality, recommended that she name him after Argentina's goalscorer, Pedro Pasculli. He was instead named after Uruguayan Fernando Morena. At the age of eight months, he relocated to Uruguay, but retained dual nationality.

== Club career ==
=== Montevideo Wanderers/Nacional ===
Muslera began his professional football career with Montevideo Wanderers, having come through the club's youth system. After impressive performances for Wanderers, Uruguayan giants Nacional opted to take him on loan in 2007. After a display of successful performances, he began to attract attention from European clubs, and signed for Lazio in 2007.

=== Lazio ===
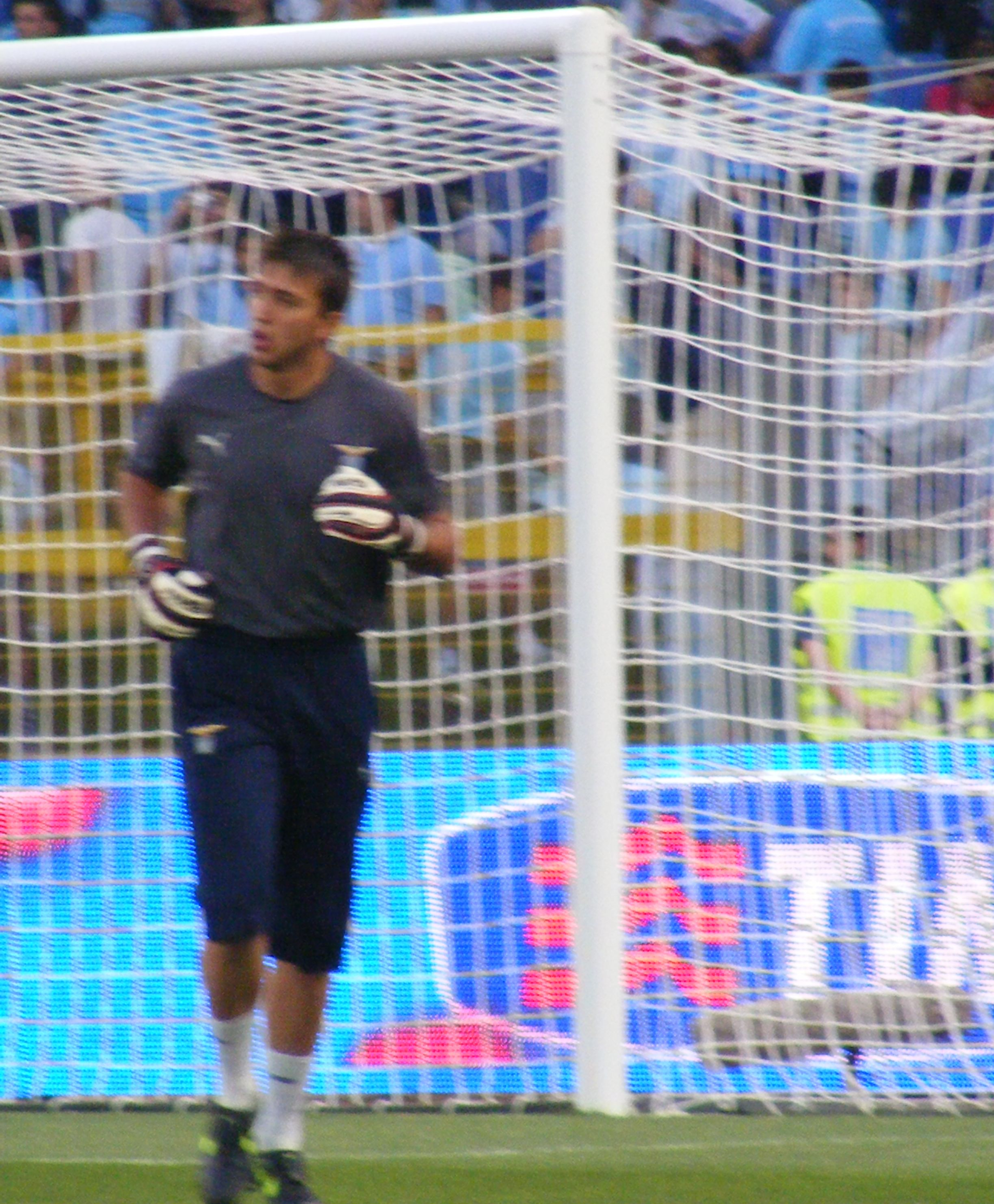
Muslera playing for Lazio.

Lazio signed Muslera in August 2007 for a fee of approximately €3 million. He made his debut for Lazio in a 3–1 home win against Cagliari on 16 September 2007, and made four more consecutive starts, the last which was a disastrous performance in Lazio's 5–1 home loss to Milan on 7 October, a match in which he was at fault for four of the five goals Lazio conceded. That result saw him benched in favour of 44-year-old Marco Ballotta. He remained as the second-choice for the remainder of the season, making only four more Serie A appearances and none in the UEFA Champions League. However, he did play all of Lazio's remaining Coppa Italia matches, putting in good performances.

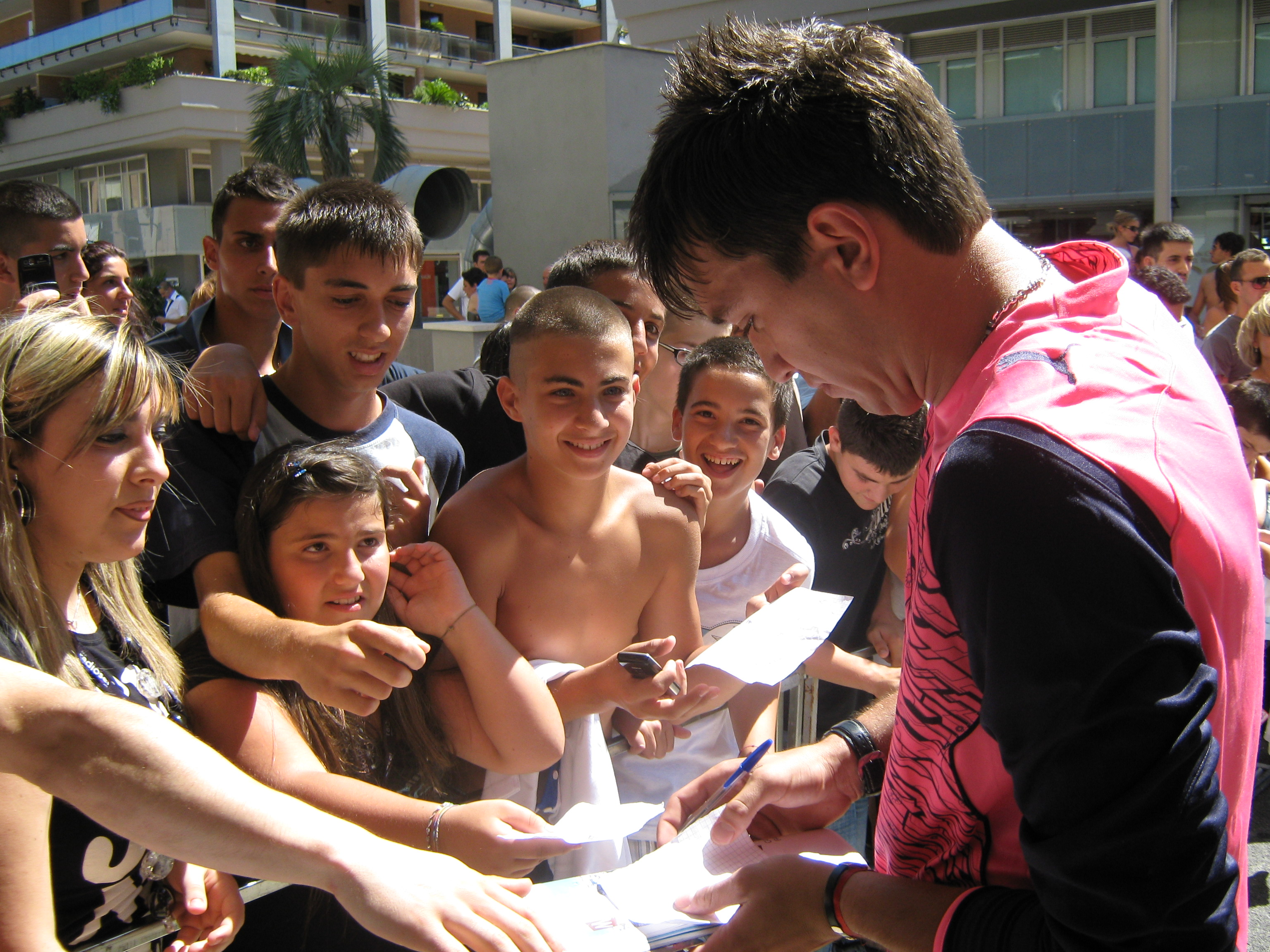
Muslera signing autographs at the new kits' presentation on 8 July 2009.

Muslera began the 2008–09 season as second-choice goalkeeper behind new signing Juan Pablo Carrizo, but regained the starting spot in January 2009 following a run of poor form by Carrizo, coupled with conflicts with team management. Muslera's first starting appearance in the Serie A season saw him make several saves in a 3–1 loss to Sampdoria, including saving an Antonio Cassano penalty. Further impressive performances in away wins over Napoli and Genoa, as well as in his first ever Derby della Capitale against Roma, saw Muslera regain a considerable amount of faith he had lost the previous season.

Known to the Lazio fans as "Castorino", or the "little beaver", Muslera was also an integral part of the club's successful 2008–09 Coppa Italia campaign, making decisive saves against Milan and Juventus as Lazio reached the final for the first time in five seasons. In the final on 13 May 2009, Muslera saved two penalties as Lazio emerged victorious 6–5 in the shootout after the match ended 1–1 in extra time.

The Uruguayan's impressive season saw him cement his position as the Roman club's first choice in the 2009–10 season, despite the arrival of Argentine goalkeeper Albano Bizzarri on a free transfer. Muslera played in goal as Lazio opened the season with a 2–1 win over 2008–09 Serie A champions Internazionale in the 2009 Supercoppa Italiana, played in Beijing.

Following his successful performance in the 2010 FIFA World Cup with Uruguay, Muslera was voted the seventh-best goalkeeper in the world by the International Federation of Football History & Statistics.

=== Galatasaray ===
==== 2011–12 season ====
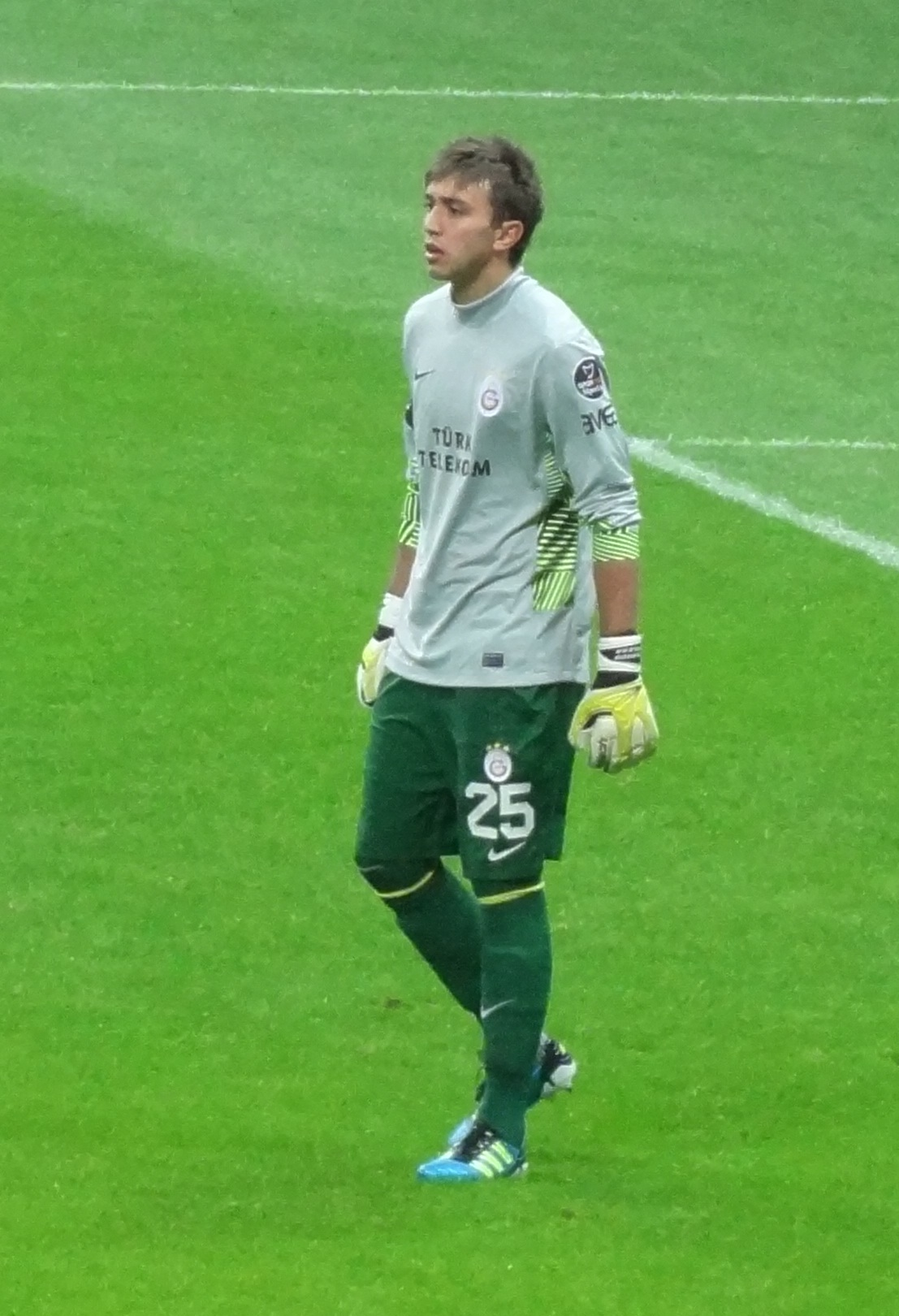
Muslera in an October 2011 match against Gaziantepspor

On 19 July 2011, Turkish Süper Lig club Galatasaray announced the signing of Muslera from Lazio on a five-year contract while he was on duty in the 2011 Copa América with Uruguay. The transfer involved Lorik Cana moving in the opposite direction to Lazio, while Galatasaray also paid €6.75 million to Muslera's former club, Montevideo Wanderers, which owned 50% of his playing rights. (However, Lazio valued the sale of Muslera for free (as termination of contract) as well as signing Cana for a peppercorn of €1 as a special accounting arrangement) Muslera's contract saw him earn €2 million per year.

On 5 November 2011, Muslera was selected the man of the match after saving his first penalty for Galatasaray in the match against Mersin İdmanyurdu, a 0–0 draw. On 8 April 2012, the last day of the 2011–12 Süper Lig season, Muslera scored his first career goal, a penalty against Manisaspor. The same match also resulted in Muslera keeping his 19th clean sheet of the season, an all-time league record.

==== 2012–13 season ====
Muslera continued to become Galatasaray's first choice goalkeeper in 2012–13, playing in the first match of the season in a 2–1 league victory over Kasımpaşa. On 19 September 2012, he made his UEFA Champions League debut in a match against Manchester United at Old Trafford. Though Galatasaray lost the match 1–0, he saved a penalty from Nani. He kept his first clean sheet in the competition in a 1–0 victory against Manchester United at the Türk Telekom Arena. He played 33 league matches out of 34 with Galatasaray, who retained their league title.

==== 2013–14 season ====
On 3 November 2013, Muslera suffered a fractured toe and therefore missed three Süper Lig and two Champions League matches. However, he played 29 league matches out of 34. At the end of the 2013–14 season, it was announced Muslera extended his contract until 2018, and would earn €2.75 million per season.

==== 2014–15 season ====
Muslera played 31 matches as Galatasaray regained their league title, but was absent in their cup final victory over Bursaspor due to his commitments for the 2015 Copa América.

==== Later seasons ====
In a league match against Çaykur Rizespor on 14 June 2020, Muslera suffered a double leg fracture as he collided with a Rizespor player in his box.

On 27 February 2021, Muslera played his 300th league match for Galatasaray against BB Erzurumspor, breaking the appearances record for a foreign player in the Süper Lig.

==== 2021–22 season ====
On 13 December 2021, in an away league match against Sivasspor, Muslera collided with his teammate Christian Luyindama in his box and was left writhing in pain. Galatasaray stated that the collision had torn the medial collateral ligament on Muslera’s left knee and also hurt the anterior cruciate ligament.

==== 2022–23 season ====
Muslera won his sixth Süper Lig title in the 2022–23 season with the Galatasaray team.

==== 2023–24 season ====
Defeating Ankaragücü 4–1 away in the match played in the 36th week on 30 May 2023, Galatasaray secured the lead with 2 weeks before the end and won the 23rd championship in its history.

==== 2024–25 season ====
Muslera became Galatasaray's most-capped player ever in the Süper Lig by taking the field against Konyaspor on 24 January 2025. With this match, Muslera, who played in the Süper Lig for the 429th time, left Bülent Korkmaz behind and went down in club history.

He scored his second career goal from a penalty on 18 May 2025 during a 3–0 win against Kayserispor that secured the 2024–25 Süper Lig title.

In a press conference on 29 May, Muslera announced that the İstanbul Başakşehir match on the following day would be his last for Galatasaray. Muslera won a total of 19 trophies in his Galatasaray career. On 30 May 2025, in the last match of the season, İstanbul Başakşehir, Fernando Muslera stayed on the pitch until the 88th minute of the match, and he wore the number 25 jersey, which he wore in the opening match of the 2011-12 season on 11 September 2011 against the same opponent, and said goodbye to Galatasaray, leaving his place to Günay Güvenç. Twelve days after the match, on 11 June 2025, Muslera left Turkey.

=== Estudiantes ===
On 24 June 2025, Muslera transferred to Argentine club Estudiantes, on a contract until December 2026.

== International career ==
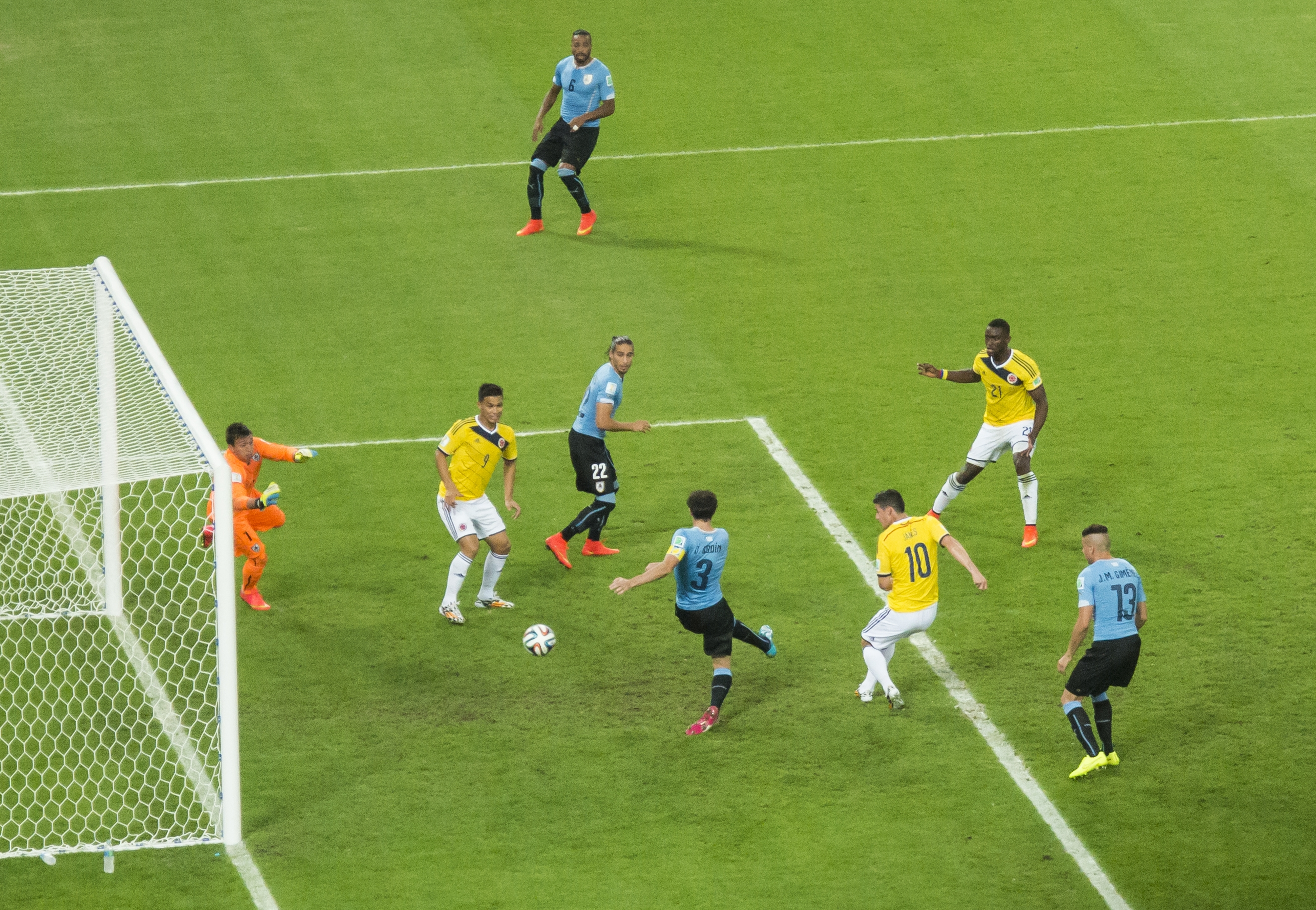
James Rodríguez (wearing number 10) scoring a goal for Colombia as Muslera looks on alongside his compatriots during the 2014 FIFA World Cup

Muslera had been called up for the Uruguay national team on numerous occasions, but did not earn his first cap until 10 October 2009, when he started in Uruguay's 2–1 away win over Ecuador. The match was Uruguay's penultimate qualifier for the 2010 FIFA World Cup in South Africa.

=== 2010 FIFA World Cup ===
Muslera made his World Cup debut against France on 11 June 2010, Uruguay's opening match of the tournament. He kept a clean sheet during all three of Uruguay's group matches (0–0 against France, 3–0 against South Africa and 1–0 against Mexico). In the round of 16, Uruguay faced South Korea; before the goal Uruguay conceded, Muslera had set a record for longest unbeaten goalkeeper in the World Cup. He was decisive in the quarter-final match against Ghana, where he saved two penalties at the penalty shootout. He was a key component of the Uruguay team that reached the semi-finals of the World Cup and subsequently finished fourth in the tournament.

=== 2011 Copa América ===
Muslera was called again by coach Óscar Tabárez to represent Uruguay as the first-choice goalkeeper at the 2011 Copa América, held in Argentina. He was selected man of the match in the quarter-final against Argentina in which Uruguay progressed on penalties, with Muslera saving a penalty from Carlos Tevez to win the match. Uruguay went on to win the Copa América title, defeating Paraguay 3–0 in the final. Muslera started every game and played in every minute of Uruguay’s successful cup campaign.

=== 2014–2020: Two World Cup appearances ===
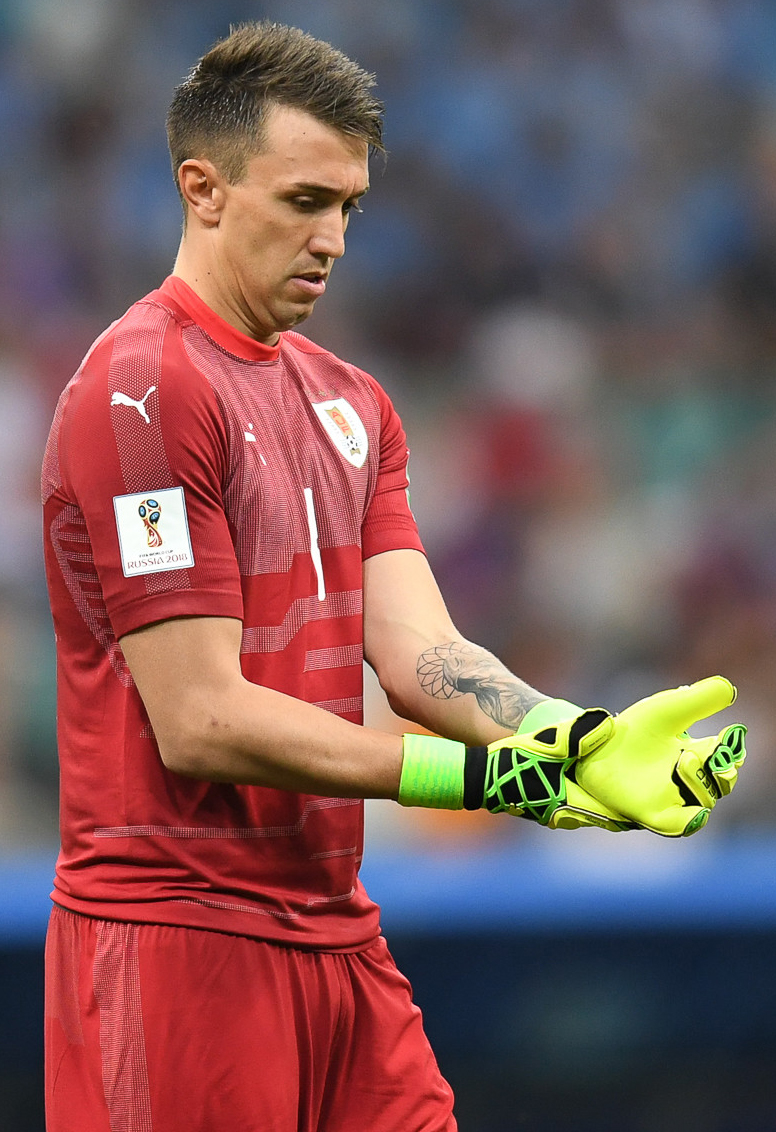
Muslera at the 2018 FIFA World Cup

Muslera was Uruguay's first-choice goalkeeper at the 2014 World Cup and the 2015 Copa América, playing every minute as Uruguay reached the last 16 of the former and the quarter-finals of the latter. He similarly featured in all of Uruguay's games at the Copa América Centenario the following year, where they suffered a first round elimination.

In May 2018, Muslera was named in Uruguay's provisional 26-man squad for the 2018 FIFA World Cup in Russia. He later made the final 23-man squad, and in his nation's second match of the tournament on 20 June, a 1–0 win over Saudi Arabia, he equaled the record of Ladislao Mazurkiewicz for the most World Cup appearances by Uruguayan footballer, with 13 such appearances.

In his team's final group match on 25 June, a 3–0 win over hosts Russia on 25 June, he broke Mazurkiewicz's record with his 14th World Cup appearance for Uruguay, also making his 100th appearance for his country in the same match, marking the occasion with his third consecutive clean sheet of the tournament. In the quarter-final match against France on 6 July, Uruguay were defeated 2–0; the second goal of the match arose after Muslera mishandled Antoine Griezmann's strike from outside the area.

On 6 September 2019, Muslera made his first appearance as Uruguay's captain, starting in a 2–1 friendly away win against Costa Rica.

=== 2020–2026: Five consecutive World Cup selections ===
In the 2022 FIFA World Cup, Muslera lost his place as the national team's first-choice keeper to Sergio Rochet. In January 2023, Muslera along with one more player, faced a ban for four matches by FIFA, and a fine of $21,701 for misconduct during the FIFA World Cup in Qatar after the Ghana match. On 25 April 2024, Muslera announced his retirement from the national team.

In March 2026, he was recalled to the squad for friendlies against England and Algeria. On 31 May 2026, he was named in Uruguay's 26-man squad for the 2026 FIFA World Cup. This made him the first Uruguayan player to feature in five squads for the FIFA World Cup, and one of twelve overall. On 15 June, he played the full match in Uruguay's group opener against Saudi Arabia, becoming the Uruguayan with the most World Cup appearances along with Edinson Cavani and the oldest player to appear at a World Cup for Uruguay, over three years ahead of Diego Godín, at 39 years and 364 days. In his record-breaking 18th World Cup match against Cape Verde, he came out of his penalty area but was dribbled past by Hélio Varela, who scored the equalizer in a 2–2 draw. During Uruguay's final group-stage match at the World Cup against Spain, Muslera was substituted at halftime after a first-half goalkeeping error led to Spain's opening goal, in a match that ended in a 1–0 defeat and group-stage elimination with two points. He announced his second retirement following the World Cup exit.

== Style of play ==
An acrobatic goalkeeper, Muslera is mainly known for his excellent shot-stopping and ability in the air.

== Personal life ==
Muslera and his wife Patricia Callero have a son and two daughters. Their younger daughter was born on his 36th birthday.

== Career statistics ==
=== Club ===
As of match played 22 October 2026

Appearances and goals by club, season and competition
Club	Season	League			National cup (Note: Includes Coppa Italia, Turkish Cup)		Continental		Other		Total	
Club	Season	Division	Apps	Goals	Apps	Goals	Apps	Goals	Apps	Goals	Apps	Goals
Montevideo Wanderers	2004	Uruguayan Primera División	2	0	—		—		—		2	0
Montevideo Wanderers	2005	Uruguayan Primera División	29	0	—		—		—		29	0
Montevideo Wanderers	2005–06	Uruguayan Primera División	0	0	—		—		—		0	0
Montevideo Wanderers	2006–07	Uruguayan Primera División	13	0	—		—		—		13	0
Montevideo Wanderers	Total		44	0	—		—		—		44	0
Nacional	2006–07	Uruguayan Primera División	9	0	—		0	0	—		9	0
Nacional	2007–08	Uruguayan Primera División	1	0	—		7 (Note: Appearances in Copa Libertadores)	0	—		8	0
Nacional	Total		10	0	—		7	0	—		17	0
Lazio	2007–08	Serie A	9	0	4	0	—		—		13	0
Lazio	2008–09	Serie A	15	0	6	0	—		—		21	0
Lazio	2009–10	Serie A	36	0	2	0	4 (Note: Appearances in UEFA Europa League)	0	1 (Note: Appearance in Supercoppa Italiana)	0	43	0
Lazio	2010–11	Serie A	36	0	0	0	—		—		36	0
Lazio	Total		96	0	12	0	4	0	1	0	113	0
Galatasaray	2011–12	Süper Lig	39	1	0	0	—		—		39	1
Galatasaray	2012–13	Süper Lig	33	0	0	0	10 (Note: Appearances in UEFA Champions League)	0	1 (Note: Appearance in Turkish Super Cup)	0	44	0
Galatasaray	2013–14	Süper Lig	29	0	3	0	6	0	1	0	39	0
Galatasaray	2014–15	Süper Lig	32	0	1	0	5	0	1	0	39	0
Galatasaray	2015–16	Süper Lig	33	0	6	0	8 (Note: Six appearances in UEFA Champions League, two appearances in UEFA Europa League)	0	1	0	48	0
Galatasaray	2016–17	Süper Lig	34	0	0	0	—		1	0	35	0
Galatasaray	2017–18	Süper Lig	33	0	3	0	2	0	—		38	0
Galatasaray	2018–19	Süper Lig	33	0	3	0	8 (Note: Six appearances in UEFA Champions League, two appearances in UEFA Europa League)	0	1	0	45	0
Galatasaray	2019–20	Süper Lig	26	0	2	0	6	0	1	0	35	0
Galatasaray	2020–21	Süper Lig	22	0	1	0	0	0	—		23	0
Galatasaray	2021–22	Süper Lig	25	0	0	0	11 (Note: Two appearances in UEFA Champions League, nine appearances in UEFA Europa League)	0	—		36	0
Galatasaray	2022–23	Süper Lig	33	0	2	0	—		—		35	0
Galatasaray	2023–24	Süper Lig	37	0	0	0	14 (Note: Twelve appearances in UEFA Champions League, two appearances in UEFA Europa League)	0	1	0	52	0
Galatasaray	2024–25	Süper Lig	34	1	0	0	8 (Note: Two appearances in UEFA Champions League, six appearances in UEFA Europa League)	0	1	0	43	1
Galatasaray	Total		443	2	21	0	78	0	9	0	551	2
Estudiantes	2025	Argentine Primera División	19	0	—		4	0	2 (Note: One Appearance in Supercopa Internacional, one appearance in Trofeo de Campeones de la Liga Profesional)	0	25	0
Estudiantes	2026	Argentine Primera División	20	0	2	0	12	0	1 (Note: Appearance in Supercopa Internacional)	0	35	0
Estudiantes	Total		39	0	2	0	16	0	3	0	60	0
Career total			632	2	35	0	105	0	13	0	785	2

=== International ===
As of match played 26 June 2026

Appearances and goals by national team and year
National team	Year	Apps	Goals
Uruguay	2009	4	0
Uruguay	2010	12	0
Uruguay	2011	15	0
Uruguay	2012	10	0
Uruguay	2013	14	0
Uruguay	2014	11	0
Uruguay	2015	11	0
Uruguay	2016	11	0
Uruguay	2017	6	0
Uruguay	2018	11	0
Uruguay	2019	11	0
Uruguay	2020	0	0
Uruguay	2021	15	0
Uruguay	2022	2	0
Uruguay	2023	0	0
Uruguay	2024	0	0
Uruguay	2025	0	0
Uruguay	2026	4	0
Total		137	0

== Honours ==
Lazio

- Coppa Italia: 2008–09
- Supercoppa Italiana: 2009

Galatasaray

- Süper Lig: 2011–12, 2012–13, 2014–15, 2017–18, 2018–19, 2022–23, 2023–24, 2024–25
- Turkish Cup: 2013–14, 2014–15, 2015–16, 2018–19, 2024–25
- Turkish Super Cup: 2012, 2013, 2015, 2016, 2019, 2023

Estudiantes

- Primera División: 2025 Clausura
- Trofeo de Campeones: 2025
- Supercopa Argentina: 2025

Uruguay

- Copa América: 2011

Individual

- Turkish Footballer of the Year: 2016
- Süper Lig Goalkeeper of the season: 2017–18
- Süper Lig Team of the Year: 2014–15, 2017–18, 2019–20, 2021–22, 2022–23

== See also ==
- List of men's footballers with 100 or more international caps

Sporting positions
Preceded by Selçuk İnan	Galatasaray captain 2020–2025	Succeeded by Mauro Icardi
