= Fehmi Sağınoğlu =

Turkish footballer (1937–2016)

Personal information
- Date of birth: 1937
- Date of death: 19 September 2016 (aged 78–79)
- Height: 1.75 m (5 ft 9 in)
- Position: Left-back

International career
Years	Team	Apps	(Gls)
1965–1968	Turkey	18	(0)

Fehmi Sağınoğlu (1937 – 19 September 2016) was a Turkish footballer who played as a left-back. He made 18 appearances for the Turkey national team from 1965 to 1968.
