= Zinnur Sarı =

Turkish footballer (1947–2007)

Personal information
- Date of birth: 4 April 1947
- Date of death: 9 August 2007 (aged 60)
- Position: Defender

Senior career*
| Years | Team | Apps | (Gls) |
| 1966–1978 | Altay | | |

Managerial career
- 1988–1992: TKİ Tavşanlı Linyitspor
- 1993: Altay
- 1995: Altay (assistant)
- 1996: Altay (academy)
- 1996–1997: Altay (assistant)
- 1997–1998: Altay (academy)
- 1998–1999: Altay
- 1999–2000: Yeni Salihlispor
- 2001: Torbalıspor
- * Club domestic league appearances and goals

Zinnur Sarı (4 April 1947 – 9 August 2007) was a Turkish football player and manager who played as a defender.
