= Halil Bıçakçı =

Turkish football manager (1926–1989)

Personal information
- Date of birth: 11 July 1926
- Place of birth: İzmir, Turkey
- Date of death: 28 February 1989 (aged 62)

Managerial career
- Years: Team
- 1967: Altay
- 1967–1968: Altay
- 1987–1988: İzmirspor

Halil Bıçakçı (11 July 1926 – 28 February 1989) was a Turkish professional football manager. Bıçakçı managed Altay when they won the 1966–67 Turkish Cup.

== Honours ==
Altay

- Turkish Cup: 1966–67
