= 1998 Presidential Cup =

- Event: Turkish Super Cup
Galatasaray SK	Beşiktaş JK
1	2
- Date: 15 May 1998
- Venue: 19 Mayıs Stadı, Ankara
- Referee: Erol Ersoy (Turkey)
- Attendance: 11,962
- Weather: Fine

The Turkish Super Cup match was a football match between the Turkish Super League champion, Galatasaray SK, and the Turkish Cup winner, Beşiktaş JK. It was the last match under the name Presidential Cup and the last match between the Turkish Super League champion and the Turkish Cup winner until 2005.

== Match details ==
15 May 1998
20:00 EEST

Galatasaray	1–2	Beşiktaş
M. Gönülaçar 67'	Report (in Turkish)	Amokachi 17'; N. Kahveci 113'

Ankara 19 Mayıs Stadium, Ankara
Attendance: 11,962
Referee: Erol Ersoy

Galatasaray	Beşiktaş

GALATASARAY:
1	(Turkey) Mehmet Bölükbaşı
2	(Turkey) Fatih Akyel
3	(Turkey) Vedat İnceefe	(substituted off) 89'
4	(Turkey) Hakan Ünsal	(yellow card) 20'
7	(Turkey) Okan Buruk	(yellow card) 40'
10	(Turkey) Suat Kaya	(substituted off) 46'
5	(Turkey) Tugay Kerimoğlu (c)
8	(Turkey) Ergün Penbe
11	(Turkey) Osman Coşkun	(substituted off) 101'
9	(Turkey) Hakan Şükür
6	(Turkey) Arif Erdem
Substitutes:
12	(Turkey) Volkan Kilimci
14	(Turkey) Feti Okuroğlu	(substituted on) 89'
15	(Turkey) Bülent Korkmaz
16	(Turkey) Mehmet Gönülaçar	(substituted on) 46'
17	(Turkey) Adnan İlgin
18	(Turkey) Emre Belözoğlu	(substituted on) 101'
Manager:
(Turkey) Fatih Terim

BEŞİKTAŞ:
1	(Turkey) Fevzi Tuncay
9	(Turkey) Ertuğrul Sağlam	(yellow card) 55'
4	(Turkey) Rahim Zafer
5	(Turkey) Alpay Özalan	(yellow card) 81'
7	(Turkey) Erkan Avseren	(yellow card) 44'
2	(Turkey) Yusuf Tokaç	(substituted off) 70'
6	(Bulgaria) Zlatko Yankov	(substituted off) 60'
3	(Turkey) Tayfur Havutçu (c)
8	(Turkey) Mutlu Topçu	(substituted off) 79'
10	(Turkey) Mehmet Özdilek
11	(Nigeria) Daniel Amokachi
Substitutes:
12	(Turkey) Hakan Çalışkan
13	(Turkey) Serdar Topraktepe	(substituted on) 79'
14	(Turkey) Savaş Kaya
15	(Turkey) Yasin Sülün
16	(Turkey) Aydın Tuna
17	(Turkey) Hikmet Çapanoğlu	(substituted on) 60' (yellow card) 77'
18	(Turkey) Nihat Kahveci	(substituted on) 70'
Manager:
(Wales) John Toshack

Assistant referees:
(Turkey) Mehmet Kaya
(Turkey) Ercan İnegöllüler
Fourth official:
(Turkey) İbrahim Aksoy
