= 2010–11 Turkish Cup =

Ziraat Türkiye Kupası

Tournament details
- Country: Turkey
- Dates: 1 September 2010 – 11 May 2011
- Teams: 72

Final positions
- Champions: Beşiktaş (9th title)
- Runners-up: İstanbul B.B.
- UEFA Europa League: Beşiktaş

Tournament statistics
- Matches played: 105
- Top goal scorer: (Portugal) Hugo Almeida (4 goals)

Awards
- Best player: (Portugal) Ricardo Quaresma

The 2010–11 Turkish Cup was the 49th edition of the annual tournament that determined the association football Süper Lig Turkish Cup (Turkish: Türkiye Kupası) champion under the auspices of the Turkish Football Federation (Turkish: Türkiye Futbol Federasyonu; TFF). Beşiktaş defeated İstanbul B.B. in the final. This tournament was conducted under the UEFA Cup system having replaced at the 44th edition a standard knockout competition scheme.

Beşiktaş advanced to the play-off round of the 2011–12 UEFA Europa League and qualified for the 2011 Turkish Super Cup. Trabzonspor were eliminated in the group stage. Trabzonspor (defending champions), Bursaspor (1st, Süper Lig), Fenerbahçe (2nd), and Galatasaray (3rd), automatically qualified for the group stage.

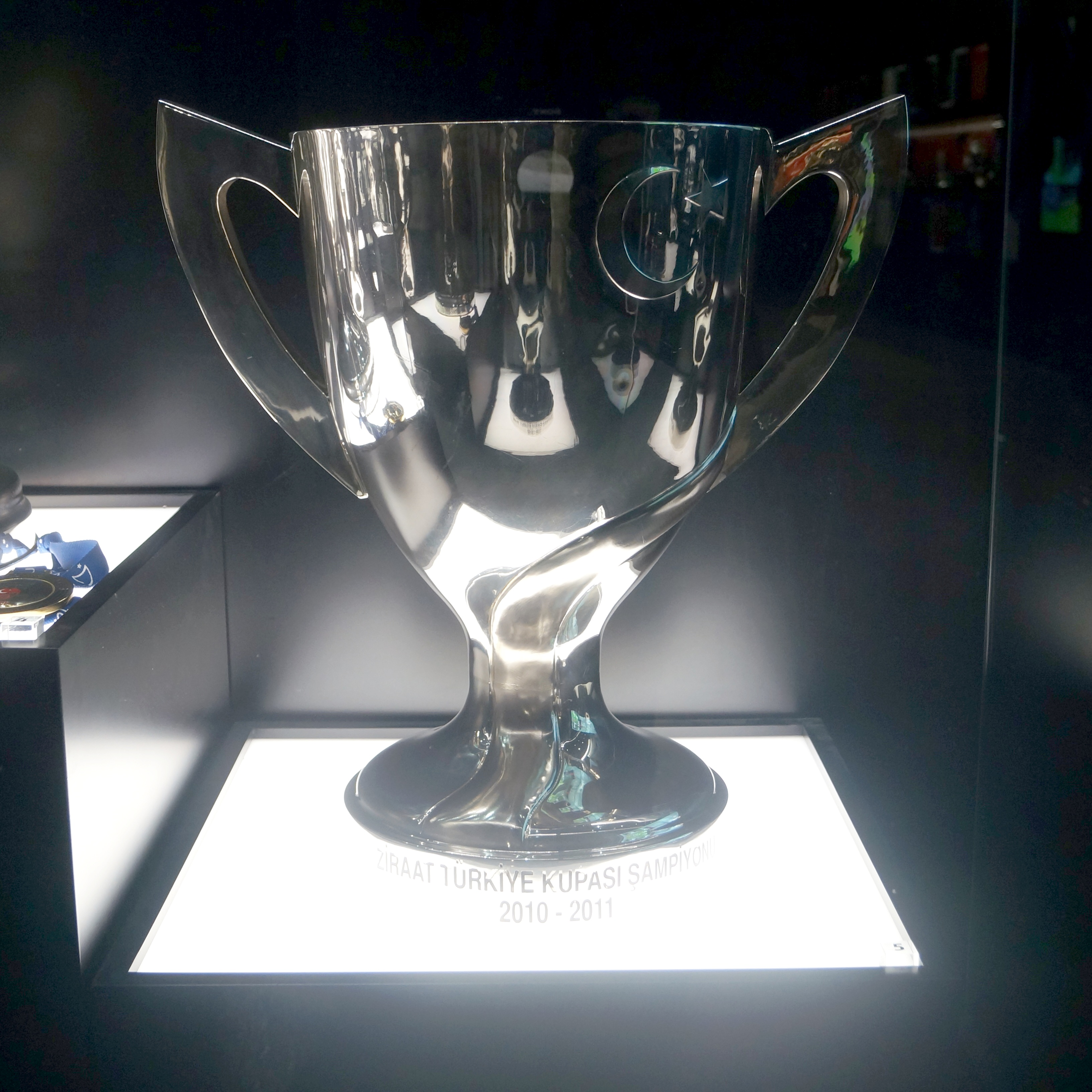
2010–11 Turkish Cup in Beşiktaş Museum

== Teams ==
Round	Clubs remaining	Clubs involved	Winners from previous round	New entries this round	Leagues entering at this round
First Round	71	36	none	36	Levels 3 and 4 in football league pyramid
Second Round	54	36	18	18	Clubs unable to earn promotion from the 1.Lig (Second tier) and the three relegated clubs from the top-flight.
Play-off Round	34	32	18	14	Clubs promoted to the top-flight and clubs who finished 5th-15th in the top-flight.
Group Stages	20	20	16	4	The four seeded clubs (defending champions and clubs place 1st-3rd in the top-flight. If the defending champions have also been seeded because of their league placement, their seed goes to the runners-up.)
Quarter-Finals	8	8	8	none	none
Semi-Finals	4	4	4	none	none
Final	2	2	2	none	none

== First round ==
The draw for the First Round took place at the headquarters of the TFF in Istanbul on 23 August 2010. The matches were played on 1 September 2010.

Team 1	Score	Team 2
Anadolu Üsküdar 1908	3–2	Eyüpspor
Güngören Belediyespor	3–1	Gaziosmanpaşaspor
Darıca Gençlerbirliği	3–1	Gebzespor
Bandırmaspor	5–1	TKİ Tavşanlı Linyitspor
Balıkesirspor	1–0	Körfez Belediyespor
Konya Torku Şekerspor	4–4 (4–2 p)	Göztepe
Torbalıspor	0–0 (4–2 p)	Akhisar Belediyespor
Turgutluspor	1–2	Menemen Belediyespor
Tokatspor	4–0	Yimpaş Yozgatspor
Türk Telekomspor	3–1	Keçiören Sportif A.Ş.
Beypazarı Şekerspor	1–0	Çorumspor
Keçiörengücü	2–1	Bugsaşspor
Akçaabat Sebatspor	1–0	Araklıspor
Pazarspor	2–3	1461 Trabzon
Kırıkhanspor	1–1 (5–4 p)	Adana Demirspor
İskenderun D.Ç.	1–0	Adıyamanspor
Yeni Malatyaspor	2–0	Siirtspor
Belediye Vanspor	1–0	Şanlıurfaspor

== Second round ==
The draw for the Second Round was conducted at the headquarters of the TFF in Istanbul on 14 September 2010. The matches were played on 22 September 2010.

Team 1	Score	Team 2
Darıca Gençlerbirliği	0–1	Çanakkale Dardanelspor
Denizlispor	2–1	Anadolu Üsküdar 1908
Karşıyaka	2–2 (4–2 p)	Kartalspor
Adanaspor	1–2 (aet)	Gaziantep Büyükşehir Belediyespor
Kayseri Erciyesspor	1–0	Çaykur Rizespor
Diyarbakırspor	0–1	Yeni Malatyaspor
Kocaelispor	1–2 (aet)	Kırıkhanspor
Beypazarı Şekerspor	2–0	Balıkesirspor
Menemen Belediyespor	1–0	Belediye Vanspor
Akçaabat Sebatspor	4–0	Keçiörengücü
Hacettepe	2–1	Boluspor
Giresunspor	0–1	Bandırmaspor
Mersin İdman Yurdu	3–2	Torbalıspor
1461 Trabzon	1–2 (aet)	Samsunspor
Türk Telekomspor	4–2	Güngören Belediyespor
Orduspor	2–0	İskenderun D.Ç.
Konya Torku Şekerspor	3–1 (aet)	Altay

== Play-off round ==
The draw for the Third Round was conducted at the headquarters of the TFF in Istanbul on 30 September 2010. The matches will be played on 26-27–28 October 2010.

Team 1	Score	Team 2
Eskişehirspor	1–2	Denizlispor
Ankaragücü	3–1	Tokatspor
Konyaspor	0–1	Bucaspor
Sivasspor	1–2	Manisaspor
Karşıyaka	3–2	Kayserispor
Kayseri Erciyesspor	1–3	Konya Torku Şekerspor
Beypazarı Şekerspor	1–1 (5–4 p)	Karabükspor
Gaziantepspor	4–0	Türk Telekomspor
Gençlerbirliği	4–1	Akçaabat Sebatspor
Beşiktaş	3–0 (aet)	Mersin İdman Yurdu
İstanbul BB	1–0	Çanakkale Dardanelspor
Orduspor	1–2 (aet)	Antalyaspor
Menemen Belediyespor	1–4	Kasımpaşa
Yeni Malatyaspor	2–0 (aet)	Hacettepe
Gaziantep Büyükşehir Belediyespor	2–0	Samsunspor
Kırıkhanspor	0–0 (4–3 p)	Bandırmaspor

== Group stage ==
The group stage consists of four groups with five teams each. The top three teams that finished from 1st place to 3rd in the 2009–10 Süper Lig and the previous cup winners were seeded as group heads: Bursaspor, Fenerbahçe, Galatasaray, and cup winners Trabzonspor. The sixteen teams who qualified through the first two rounds of elimination matches were randomly drawn into one of the four groups.

Every team will play every other team of its group once, either home or away. The winners and runners-up of each group will qualify for the quarterfinals.

=== Group A ===
Pos	Team	Pld	W	D	L	GF	GA	GD	Pts	GAZ	GAL	BEY	ANT	DEN
1	Gaziantepspor	4	3	1	0	7	2	+5	10		1–1	2–0		
2	Galatasaray	4	2	2	0	7	3	+4	8			3–1		3–1
3	Beypazarı Şekerspor	4	1	1	2	4	7	−3	4				1–1	2–1
4	Antalyaspor	4	0	3	1	4	6	−2	3	1–3	0–0			
5	Denizlispor	4	0	1	3	4	8	−4	1	0–1			2–2	

Source: tff.org (in Turkish)
Legend: Blue = home team win; Yellow = draw; Red = away team win.
Rules for classification: 1) points; 2) goal difference; 3) number of goals scored.

=== Group B ===
Pos	Team	Pld	W	D	L	GF	GA	GD	Pts	BEŞ	GBB	TRA	KON	MAN
1	Beşiktaş	4	3	0	1	8	6	+2	9			2–1	3–2	
2	Gaziantep B.B.	4	2	2	0	7	5	+2	8	1–0			2–2	
3	Trabzonspor	4	2	1	1	9	6	+3	7		2–2			3–1
4	Konya Torku Şekerspor	4	1	1	2	7	9	−2	4			1–3		2–1
5	Manisaspor	4	0	0	4	5	10	−5	0	2–3	1–2			

Source: tff.org (in Turkish)
Legend: Blue = home team win; Yellow = draw; Red = away team win.
Rules for classification: 1) points; 2) goal difference; 3) number of goals scored.

=== Group C ===
Pos	Team	Pld	W	D	L	GF	GA	GD	Pts	GEN	BUC	ANK	YEN	FEN
1	Gençlerbirliği	4	2	1	1	6	4	+2	7			1–1	2–0	
2	Bucaspor	4	2	1	1	7	6	+1	7	1–2			2–1	
3	Ankaragücü	4	1	3	0	6	4	+2	6		1–1			4–2
4	Yeni Malatyaspor	4	1	1	2	3	5	−2	4			0–0		2–1
5	Fenerbahçe	4	1	0	3	7	10	−3	3	2–1	2–3			

Source: tff.org (in Turkish)
Legend: Blue = home team win; Yellow = draw; Red = away team win.
Rules for classification: 1) points; 2) goal difference; 3) number of goals scored.

=== Group D ===
Pos	Team	Pld	W	D	L	GF	GA	GD	Pts	KSM	İBB	BUR	KAR	KIR
1	Kasımpaşa	4	4	0	0	9	2	+7	12			3–1		2–0
2	İstanbul B.B.	4	3	0	1	4	3	+1	9	1–3			1–0	
3	Bursaspor	4	1	1	2	4	5	−1	4		0–1			1–1
4	Karşıyaka	4	1	0	3	5	6	−1	3	0–1		0–2		
5	Kırıkhanspor	4	0	1	3	3	9	−6	1		0–1		2–5	

Source: tff.org (in Turkish)
Legend: Blue = home team win; Yellow = draw; Red = away team win.
Rules for classification: 1) points; 2) goal difference; 3) number of goals scored.

== Bracket ==
Quarterfinals
1	Beşiktaş	5	3	8
8	Gaziantep B.B.	0	0	0
4	Gaziantepspor	3	0	3
5	Galatasaray	2	0	2
2	İstanbul B.B. (aet, a)	0	1	1
7	Kasımpaşa	0	1	1
3	Gençlerbirliği	2	2	4
6	Bucaspor	0	1	1

Semifinals
Beşiktaş	3	2	5
Gaziantepspor	0	2	2
İstanbul B.B.	1	3	4
Gençlerbirliği	1	0	1

Finals
Beşiktaş (p)
İstanbul B.B.

== Quarter-finals ==
In this round the winners and runners-up of all of the previous round's groups were entered. The draw was conducted by the TFF in the Ataköy Olympic House in Istanbul on 28 January 2011 at 11:00 local time. There were no seedings in the draw, and consequently teams from the same groups were drawn against each other. The teams competed in two-leg playoffs. The first leg matches were played on 2 and 3 February while the second leg matches were played on 2 and 3 March 2011. The lowest-ranked, and incidentally the only non-Süper Lig team to qualify for this stage of the competition was Gaziantep Büyükşehir Belediyespor, at that time competing in the TFF First League, the 2nd tier of Turkish football.

Team 1	Agg.	Team 2	1st leg	2nd leg
Beşiktaş	8–0	Gaziantep B.B.	5–0	3–0
Gaziantepspor	3–2	Galatasaray	3–2	0–0
İstanbul B.B.	1–1 (a)	Kasımpaşa	0–0	1–1 (aet)
Gençlerbirliği	4–1	Bucaspor	2–0	2–1

== Semi-finals ==
The draw was conducted by the TFF in the Ataköy Olympic House in Istanbul on 28 January 2011 at 11:00 local time. The teams competed in two-leg playoffs. The first leg matches were played on 6 and 7 April while the second leg matches were played on 20 and 21 April 2011.

=== Summary table ===
Team 1	Agg.	Team 2	1st leg	2nd leg
Beşiktaş	5–2	Gaziantepspor	3–0	2–2
İstanbul B.B.	4–1	Gençlerbirliği	1–1	3–0

=== 1st leg ===
6 April 2011 Semi-final	Beşiktaş	3–0	Gaziantepspor	Istanbul
20:00 EEST (UTC+03)	Simão 64', 86'; Almeida 75'			Stadium: BJK İnönü Stadium; Referee: Bülent Yıldırım

7 April 2011 Semi-final	İstanbul B.B.	1–1	Gençlerbirliği	Istanbul
20:00 EEST (UTC+03)	Hološko 62' (pen.)		Mustafa 20'	Stadium: Atatürk Olympic Stadium; Referee: Halis Özkahya

=== 2nd leg ===
20 April 2011 Semi-final	Gaziantepspor	2–2	Beşiktaş	Gaziantep
19:00 EEST (UTC+03)	Olcan 5', 68'		Simão 33' (pen.); Almeida 49'	Stadium: Kamil Ocak Stadium; Referee: Kuddusi Müftüoğlu

21 April 2011 Semi-final	Gençlerbirliği	0–3	İstanbul B.B.	Ankara
19:00 EEST (UTC+03)			İbrahim 11', 22'; Tum 26'	Stadium: Ankara 19 Mayıs Stadium; Referee: Yunus Yıldırım

== Final ==
The final was played in Kadir Has Stadium, Kayseri on 11 May 2011. This was the first time for Kayseri Kadir Has Stadium to host a cup final, which opened its gates in March 2009. The kick-off was at 20:00 EEST. The match ended on a 2-2 draw and there were no goals in the extra time. Beşiktaş went on to win the final on penalties.

11 May 2011 Final	Beşiktaş	2–2 (a.e.t.) (4–3 p)	İstanbul B.B.	Kayseri, Turkey
20:00 EEST (UTC+03)	Quaresma 33'; Sivok 78'	Report (in Turkish)	İbrahim 53' (pen.); Gökhan 68'	Stadium: Kadir Has Stadium; Attendance: 28,000; Referee: Yunus Yıldırım; Man of the Match: Ricardo Quaresma
	Penalties
	Almeida (penalty scored); Fernandes (penalty scored); Aurélio (penalty scored); Hilbert (penalty missed); Simão (penalty scored)		(penalty missed) Cihan; (penalty scored) Ekrem; (penalty scored) Gökhan; (penalty scored) Holmén; (penalty missed) Metin

== See also ==
- 2011 Turkish Super Cup
