= Süreyya Özkefe =

Turkish footballer (1939–2025)

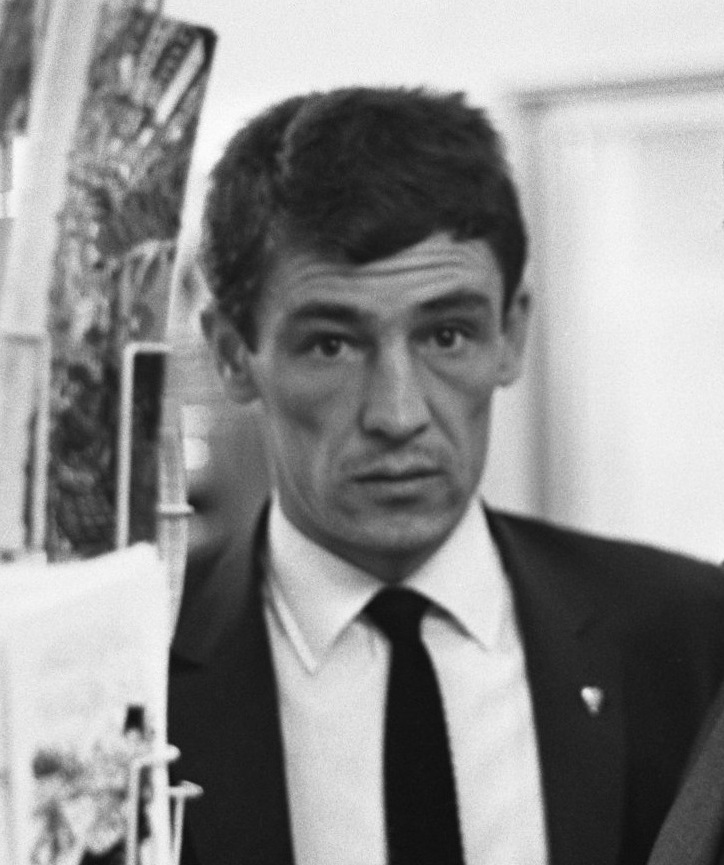
- Özkefe in 1966

Personal information
- Date of birth: 8 May 1939
- Place of birth: Eskişehir, Turkey
- Date of death: 29 July 2025 (aged 86)
- Place of death: Eskişehir, Turkey

Senior career*
Years	Team	Apps	(Gls)
- Ankara Demirspor
- Beşiktaş
- Eskişehirspor

International career
1961–1965	Turkey	9	(0)
- * Club domestic league appearances and goals

Süreyya Özkefe (8 May 1939 – 29 July 2025) was a Turkish footballer who played as a defensive midfielder. He made nine appearances for the Turkey national team from 1961 to 1965.

== Career ==
Özkefe played for several Turkish clubs, like the Ankara Demirspor, Beşiktaş, and Eskişehirspor. Özkefe also participated in nine matches between 1961 and 1965 internationally, though he did not score during these appearances.
