= Turkish Super Cup =

Football league in Turkey

TFF Süper Kupa
- Organising body: Turkish Football Federation (TFF)
- Founded: 1966
- Country: Turkey
- Confederation: UEFA
- Number of clubs: 2 (until 2024); 4 (2025–present)
- Current champions: Fenerbahçe (10th title) (2025)
- Most championships: Galatasaray (17 titles)
- Broadcaster(s): atv
- Website: tff.org
- Current: 2025 Turkish Super Cup

The Turkish Super Cup, known as Turkcell Super Cup (Turkish: Turkcell Süper Kupa) for sponsorship reasons, is a super cup tournament in Turkish football. Founded in 1966 as a two-team competition, the current version has been contested since 2025 by four teams: the winners and runners-up of the Turkish Cup and Süper Lig. It was originally known as the Cumhurbaşkanlığı Kupası (Presidential Cup) from 1966 to 1998. No competition was held between 1999 and 2005, although there was a substitute competition played under the name of Atatürk Cup in 2000. The rebranded TFF Süper Kupa is a curtain raiser for the upcoming footballing season, usually taking place in August. In case of a team achieving the double, the Turkish Cup runners-up become finalists.

The current holders are 2024-25 Süper Lig runners-up Fenerbahçe, who won against 2024–25 Süper Lig and 2024-25 Turkish Cup winners Galatasaray in the 2025 edition. Galatasaray is the most successful team of the competition, with 17 titles in 28 appearances.

== History ==
Between 1966 and 1980 the cup was called Cumhurbaşkanlığı Kupası (Presidential Cup). Following the Turkish coup d'état in 1980, it was renamed to Devlet Başkanlığı Kupası (Head of State Cup) for the 1981 and 1982 finals. After the resumption of democracy, the tournament was renamed back to Cumhurbaşkanlığı Kupası, taking place from 1983 to 1998. Between 1999 and 2005 no competition was held. In the year 2000 there was a substitute competition called Atatürk Cup. In a bid to rebrand and revive the tournament as a super cup, an inaugural 2006 final took place in Germany, where a large population of Turkish immigrants reside. The success of the new format led to the continuation of the TFF Süper Kupa as it is known and contested today.

During the Cumhurbaşkanlığı Kupası era, all matches were played in the Ankara 19 Mayıs Stadium, in the city of Ankara. The only exception to this tradition was the 1975 final, played in the Cebeci İnönü Stadium. After the 2006 rebranding, the cup continued to be contested in a neutral venue, which is picked annually by the Turkish Football Federation.

The finalists always consisted of Süper Lig champions and Turkish Cup winners, but there were exceptions to this rule. In 1968, Fenerbahçe won both the league and the cup, thus achieving the double. The TFF decided to award the Cumhurbaşkalığı Kupası directly to the club, but went on to change the regulations after this case. Between 1973 and 1977, in case of a team achieving the double, the Başbakanlık Kupası (Prime Minister's Cup) winners became the second finalists. During the Turkish coup d'état in 1980, elect government was abolished and between 1981 and 1984 no competition in the name of Chancellery was held. Thus, the Turkish Football Federation made another regulatory change, and awarded the second finalists spot to the Süper Lig runners-up, in case of a team achieving the double. 1983, 1984, 1990 and 1993 finals took place in that fashion.

After the 2006 rebranding, the Turkish Federation revised the regulations for a final time, and the Turkish Cup runners-up began to earn a spot in the competition, in case of a team achieving the double, thus making the game a rematch of that year's Turkish Cup final.

The 2023 edition of the Turkish Super Cup was scheduled be held in Riyadh, Saudi Arabia as part of Riyadh Season entertainment festival. The event did not take place due to a controversy over the display of quotes and images of Turkish founding father Mustafa Kemal Atatürk and the Turkish national anthem, with both Galatasaray and Fenerbahçe abandoning the match and leaving Saudi Arabia. On 7 April 2024, the two teams faced each other at 11 Nisan Stadium. Fenerbahçe started the match with the U19 team as a reaction to the match not being postponed again. Galatasaray took the lead in the 1st minute with Mauro Icardi's goal. After the goal, Fenerbahçe President Ali Koç left the pitch and went to the dressing room in protest against the incidents in Süper Lig matches, the Turkish Football Federation and referee decisions. After Fenerbahçe's withdrawal, Galatasaray players played a double-goal match among themselves. After all these incidents, referee Volkan Bayarslan cancelled the match and it was announced that the Turkish Football Federation will decide on the match. According to the PFDK's (Professional Football Disciplinary Board) decision, Fenerbahçe was deemed 3-0 forfeit in the Super Cup and fined 4 million TRY.

== Winners ==
=== Key ===
| Finalists | | Wins |
|---|---|---|
| ¤ | Winners of both Süper Lig and Turkish Cup | 6 |
| | Süper Lig champions | 20 |
| | Turkish Cup winners | 19 |
| | Prime Minister's Cup winners | 2 |
| † | Süper Lig runners-up | 3 |
| ‡ | Süper Lig third ranked | 0 |
| ¤ | Süper Lig fourth ranked | 0 |
| # | Turkish Cup runners-up | 1 |

=== Two-team format ===
==== Presidential Cup ====
| Year | Winners | Score | Runners-up | Venue | Attendance |
|---|---|---|---|---|---|
| 1966 | Galatasaray | 2–0 | Beşiktaş | Ankara 19 Mayıs Stadı | 33,583 |
| 1967 | Beşiktaş | 1–0 | Altay | Ankara 19 Mayıs Stadı | |
| 1968 | Fenerbahçe ¤ | Automatically awarded by winning Süper Lig and Turkish Cup. | | | |
| 1969 | Galatasaray | 2–0 | Göztepe | Ankara 19 Mayıs Stadı | |
| 1970 | Göztepe | 3–1 | Fenerbahçe | Ankara 19 Mayıs Stadı | |
| 1971 | Eskişehirspor | 3–2 | Galatasaray | Ankara 19 Mayıs Stadı | |
| 1972 | Galatasaray | 3–0 | Ankaragücü | Ankara 19 Mayıs Stadı | |
| 1973 | Fenerbahçe | 2–1 | Galatasaray ¤ | Ankara 19 Mayıs Stadı | |
| 1974 | Beşiktaş | 3–0 | Fenerbahçe ¤ | Ankara 19 Mayıs Stadı | 23,435 |
| 1975 | Fenerbahçe | 2–0 | Beşiktaş | Cebeci İnönü Stadı | |
| 1976 | Trabzonspor | 2–1 | Galatasaray | Ankara 19 Mayıs Stadı | |
| 1977 | Trabzonspor ¤ | 1–1 (3–1 p) | Beşiktaş | Ankara 19 Mayıs Stadı | |
| 1978 | Trabzonspor | 1–0 | Fenerbahçe | Ankara 19 Mayıs Stadı | 13,550 |
| 1979 | Trabzonspor | 2–1 | Fenerbahçe | Ankara 19 Mayıs Stadı | 23,354 |
| 1980 | Trabzonspor | 3–0 | Altay | Ankara 19 Mayıs Stadı | 11,098 |
| 1981 | Ankaragücü | 1–0 | Trabzonspor | Ankara 19 Mayıs Stadı | 15,976 |
| 1982 | Galatasaray | 2–0 | Beşiktaş | Ankara 19 Mayıs Stadı | 20,000 |
| 1983 | Trabzonspor ^{†} | 2–0 | Fenerbahçe ¤ | Ankara 19 Mayıs Stadı | 17,895 |
| 1984 | Fenerbahçe ^{†} | 1–0 | Trabzonspor ¤ | Ankara 19 Mayıs Stadı | 12,021 |
| 1985 | Fenerbahçe | 1–1 (4–2 p) | Galatasaray | Ankara 19 Mayıs Stadı | 18,757 |
| 1986 | Beşiktaş | 2–1 | Bursaspor | Ankara 19 Mayıs Stadı | 13,783 |
| 1987 | Galatasaray | 3–2 | Gençlerbirliği | Ankara 19 Mayıs Stadı | 22,773 |
| 1988 | Galatasaray | 2–0 | Sakaryaspor | Ankara 19 Mayıs Stadı | 19,845 |
| 1989 | Beşiktaş | 1–0 | Fenerbahçe | Ankara 19 Mayıs Stadı | 15,055 |
| 1990 | Fenerbahçe ^{†} | 3–2 | Beşiktaş ¤ | Ankara 19 Mayıs Stadı | |
| 1991 | Galatasaray | 1–0 | Beşiktaş | Ankara 19 Mayıs Stadı | 14,650 |
| 1992 | Beşiktaş | 2–1 | Trabzonspor | Ankara 19 Mayıs Stadı | 20,000 |
| 1993 | Galatasaray ¤ | 2–0 | Beşiktaş ^{†} | Ankara 19 Mayıs Stadı | 18,836 |
| 1994 | Beşiktaş | 3–1 | Galatasaray | Ankara 19 Mayıs Stadı | |
| 1995 | Trabzonspor | 2–0 | Beşiktaş | Ankara 19 Mayıs Stadı | |
| 1996 | Galatasaray | 3–0 | Fenerbahçe | Ankara 19 Mayıs Stadı | |
| 1997 | Galatasaray | 2–1 | Kocaelispor | Ankara 19 Mayıs Stadı | 20,000 |
| 1998 | Beşiktaş | 2–1 | Galatasaray | Ankara 19 Mayıs Stadı | 11,962 |

==== TFF Süper Kupa ====
| Year | Winners | Score | Runners-up | Venue | Attendance |
|---|---|---|---|---|---|
| 2006 | Beşiktaş | 1–0 | Galatasaray | (Germany) Waldstadion (Frankfurt) | 25,500 |
| 2007 | Fenerbahçe | 2–1 | Beşiktaş | (Germany) RheinEnergieStadion | 38,000 |
| 2008 | Galatasaray | 2–1 | Kayserispor | (Germany) MSV-Arena | 20,000 |
| 2009 | Fenerbahçe # | 2–0 | Beşiktaş ¤ | Atatürk Olympic Stadium | |
| 2010 | Trabzonspor | 3–0 | Bursaspor | Atatürk Olympic Stadium | |
| ~~2011~~ | Cancelled after 2011 Turkish football match-fixing scandal. (Fenerbahçe (Süper Lig) – Beşiktaş (Turkish Cup)) | | | | |
| 2012 | Galatasaray | 3–2 | Fenerbahçe | Kazım Karabekir Stadium | 25,000 |
| 2013 | Galatasaray | 1–0 | Fenerbahçe | Kadir Has Stadium | 32,000 |
| 2014 | Fenerbahçe | 0–0 (3–2 p) | Galatasaray | Manisa 19 Mayıs Stadium | 16,597 |
| 2015 | Galatasaray ¤ | 1–0 | Bursaspor # | Osmanlı Stadium | 15,000 |
| 2016 | Galatasaray | 1–1 (3–0 p) | Beşiktaş | Konya Metropolitan Municipality Stadium | 33,700 |
| 2017 | Konyaspor | 2–1 | Beşiktaş | Samsun 19 Mayıs Stadium | 25,000 |
| 2018 | Akhisarspor | 1–1 (5–4 p) | Galatasaray | Konya Metropolitan Municipality Stadium | 27,000 |
| 2019 | Galatasaray ¤ | 1–0 | Akhisarspor # | Eryaman Stadium | 16,000 |
| 2020 | Trabzonspor | 2–1 | İstanbul Başakşehir | Atatürk Olympic Stadium | 0 |
| 2021 | Beşiktaş ¤ | 1–1 (4–2 p) | Antalyaspor # | (Qatar) Ahmad bin Ali Stadium | 3,500 |
| 2022 | Trabzonspor | 4–0 | Sivasspor | Atatürk Olympic Stadium | 46,732 |
| 2023 | Galatasaray | 3–0 (w/o) | Fenerbahçe | Şanlıurfa 11 Nisan Stadium | |
| 2024 | Beşiktaş | 5–0 | Galatasaray | Atatürk Olympic Stadium | 70,847 |

Four-team format

| Year | Winners | Score | Runners-up | Semi-finalists | Venue(s) |
|---|---|---|---|---|---|
| 2025 | Fenerbahçe † | 2–0 | Galatasaray ¤ | Trabzonspor, Samsunspor | Gaziantep Stadium, New Adana Stadium, Atatürk Olympic Stadium |

== Performances ==
| Club | Winners | Runners-up | % Wins | Years won | Years runners-up |
|---|---|---|---|---|---|
| Galatasaray | 17 | 11 | 60% | 1966, 1969, 1972, 1982, 1987, 1988, 1991, 1993, 1996, 1997, 2008, 2012, 2013, 2015, 2016, 2019, 2023 | 1971, 1973, 1976, 1985, 1994, 1998, 2006, 2014, 2018, 2024, 2025 |
| Beşiktaş | 10 | 12 | 45% | 1967, 1974, 1986, 1989, 1992, 1994, 1998, 2006, 2021, 2024 | 1966, 1975, 1977, 1982, 1990, 1991, 1993, 1995, 2007, 2009, 2016, 2017 |
| Fenerbahçe | 10 | 10 | 50% | 1968, 1973, 1975, 1984, 1985, 1990, 2007, 2009, 2014, 2025 | 1970, 1974, 1978, 1979, 1983, 1989, 1996, 2012, 2013, 2023 |
| Trabzonspor | 10 | 3 | 77% | 1976, 1977, 1978, 1979, 1980, 1983, 1995, 2010, 2020, 2022 | 1981, 1984, 1992 |
| Göztepe | 1 | 1 | 50% | 1970 | 1969 |
| Ankaragücü | 1 | 1 | 50% | 1981 | 1972 |
| Akhisarspor | 1 | 1 | 50% | 2018 | 2019 |
| Eskişehirspor | 1 | 0 | 100% | 1971 | |
| Konyaspor | 1 | 0 | 100% | 2017 | |
| Bursaspor | 0 | 3 | 0% | | 1986, 2010, 2015 |
| Altay | 0 | 2 | 0% | | 1967, 1980 |
| Gençlerbirliği | 0 | 1 | 0% | | 1987 |
| Kocaelispor | 0 | 1 | 0% | | 1997 |
| Sakaryaspor | 0 | 1 | 0% | | 1988 |
| Kayserispor | 0 | 1 | 0% | | 2008 |
| İstanbul Başakşehir | 0 | 1 | 0% | | 2020 |
| Antalyaspor | 0 | 1 | 0% | | 2021 |
| Sivasspor | 0 | 1 | 0% | | 2022 |

== Most common matchups ==
| # | Club (wins) | Club (wins) | Finals |
|---|---|---|---|
| 9 | Galatasaray (5) | Beşiktaş (4) | 1966, 1982, 1991, 1993, 1994, 1998, 2006, 2016, 2024 |
| 8 | Fenerbahçe (4) | Galatasaray (4) | 1973, 1985, 1996, 2012, 2013, 2014, 2023, 2025 |
| 6 | Fenerbahçe (4) | Beşiktaş (2) | 1974, 1975, 1989, 1990, 2007, 2009 |
| 4 | Trabzonspor (3) | Fenerbahçe (1) | 1978, 1979, 1983, 1984 |
| 3 | Trabzonspor (2) | Beşiktaş (1) | 1977, 1992, 1995 |

== All-time top goalscorers ==
As of 09 May 2025

| Player | Club(s) | Goals | Apps | Ref. |
|---|---|---|---|---|
| (Turkey) Hakan Şükür | Galatasaray | 5 | 6 | |
| (Turkey) Gökmen Özdenak | Galatasaray | 4 | 3 | |
| (Turkey) Metin Tekin | Beşiktaş | 4 | 4 | |
| (Colombia) Teófilo Gutiérrez | Trabzonspor | 3 | 1 | |
| (Brazil) Alex | Fenerbahçe | 3 | 3 | |

== Records ==
- Most wins: 17
  - Galatasaray (1966, 1969, 1972, 1982, 1987, 1988, 1991, 1993, 1996, 1997, 2008, 2012, 2013, 2015, 2016, 2019, 2023, 2025)
- Most appearances: 28
  - Galatasaray (1966, 1969, 1971, 1972, 1973, 1976, 1982, 1985, 1987, 1988, 1991, 1993, 1994, 1996, 1997, 1998, 2006, 2008, 2012, 2013, 2014, 2015, 2016, 2018, 2019, 2023, 2024, 2025)
- Most consecutive wins: 5
  - Trabzonspor (1976, 1977, 1978, 1979, 1980)
- Most consecutive appearances: 7
  - Beşiktaş (1989, 1990, 1991, 1992, 1993, 1994, 1995)
- Biggest win:
  - Beşiktaş 5–0 Galatasaray (2024)

=== Managers ===
- Most Turkish Super Cup wins: 5
  - Ahmet Suat Özyazıcı: 1976, 1977, 1978, 1980, 1983 (all with Trabzonspor)
  - Fatih Terim: 1996, 1997, 2012, 2013, 2019 (all with Galatasaray)

=== Players ===
- Most Turkish Super Cup wins: 6
  - Şenol Güneş: 1976, 1977, 1978, 1979, 1980, 1983 (all with Trabzonspor)
  - Turgay Semercioğlu: 1976, 1977, 1978, 1979, 1980, 1983 (all with Trabzonspor)
  - Necati Özçağlayan: 1976, 1977, 1978, 1979, 1980, 1983 (all with Trabzonspor)
  - Selçuk İnan: 2010 (Trabzonspor), 2012, 2013, 2015, 2016, 2019 (Galatasaray)
  - Fernando Muslera: 2012, 2013, 2015, 2016, 2019, 2023 (all with Galatasaray)
