= 1966–67 1.Lig =

9th season of top-tier Turkish football

1.Lig
- Season: 1966–67
- Champions: Beşiktaş (5th title)
- Relegated: İstanbulspor; İzmirspor; Karşıyaka
- European Cup: Fenerbahçe
- Cup Winners' Cup: Altay
- Inter-Cities Fairs Cup: Göztepe
- Matches played: 272
- Goals scored: 549 (2.02 per match)
- Top goalscorer: Ertan Adatepe (18 goals)

Statistics of the Turkish First Football League for the 1966–67 season.

== Overview ==
It was contested by 17 teams, and Beşiktaş J.K. won the championship.

== League table ==
Pos	Team	Pld	W	D	L	GF	GA	GD	Pts	Qualification or relegation
1	Beşiktaş (C)	32	16	13	3	44	15	+29	45	Qualification to European Cup first round
2	Fenerbahçe	32	17	9	6	37	20	+17	43	Invitation to Balkans Cup
3	Galatasaray	32	12	17	3	53	33	+20	41	
4	Göztepe A.Ş.	32	14	10	8	47	31	+16	38	Invitation to Inter-Cities Fairs Cup first round
5	Altay	32	11	10	11	27	27	0	32	Qualification to Cup Winners' Cup first round
6	Gençlerbirliği	32	8	15	9	35	28	+7	31	Invitation to Balkans Cup
7	Türk Telekomspor	32	9	13	10	34	30	+4	31	
8	Eskişehirspor	32	10	11	11	29	44	−15	31	
9	MKE Ankaragücü	32	8	14	10	29	36	−7	30	
10	Ankara Demirspor	32	8	14	10	27	35	−8	30	
11	Feriköy	32	10	10	12	29	39	−10	30	
12	Altınordu A.Ş.	32	10	9	13	39	42	−3	29	
13	Vefa	32	9	11	12	31	35	−4	29	
14	Hacettepe Spor	32	8	13	11	24	33	−9	29	
15	İstanbulspor (R)	32	10	8	14	25	28	−3	28	Relegation to Turkish Second Football League
16	İzmirspor (R)	32	6	13	13	21	37	−16	25	Relegation to Turkish Second Football League
17	Karşıyaka (R)	32	6	10	16	18	36	−18	22	Relegation to Turkish Second Football League

Rules for classification: 1) points; 2) goal difference; 3) number of goals scored.
(C) Champions; (R) Relegated

== Results ==
Home \ Away	ALT	ATO	AND	AGÜ	BJK	ESK	FNB	FER	GAL	GEN	GÖZ	HAC	İST	İZM	KSK	PTT	VEF
Altay		1–1	4–0	5–0	2–0	1–0	2–1	0–1	2–0	0–0	2–1	2–1	1–0	0–4	0–0	1–1	1–0
Altınordu	1–0		1–1	1–2	0–1	5–0	1–0	2–1	1–1	0–1	2–0	1–0	2–1	0–1	1–2	2–1	0–0
Ankara Demirspor	0–0	2–0		0–0	1–5	1–0	0–0	4–1	1–1	1–1	0–3	0–1	0–1	1–0	2–1	2–1	1–2
Ankaragücü	1–0	1–1	1–0		1–2	4–1	0–1	1–1	0–0	0–0	0–0	1–1	0–1	0–0	3–1	0–3	4–1
Beşiktaş	0–0	4–1	1–0	1–1		1–0	0–1	0–0	2–2	2–0	0–0	1–1	1–0	4–0	1–0	0–0	4–2
Eskişehirspor	3–1	1–0	0–0	1–1	0–6		1–1	3–1	2–2	1–0	2–1	1–0	1–0	0–0	1–0	1–0	3–1
Fenerbahçe	4–1	2–1	2–0	1–0	0–0	3–1		2–1	0–2	1–0	0–1	1–1	1–0	2–0	1–0	2–0	1–0
Feriköy	1–0	2–4	2–1	0–0	1–1	3–0	0–2		0–2	2–1	2–1	1–0	0–1	3–1	0–0	1–0	0–0
Galatasaray	0–0	3–1	2–2	2–1	1–1	2–2	1–3	4–0		3–3	0–0	4–0	2–1	1–1	4–0	2–1	3–2
Gençlerbirliği	3–0	1–1	1–1	1–1	0–0	4–0	1–2	0–0	1–1		2–2	0–1	0–0	1–0	1–0	2–0	2–2
Göztepe	0–0	4–2	0–0	3–0	0–2	2–2	1–0	1–1	2–1	1–1		2–1	2–1	1–2	1–2	3–1	6–1
Hacettepe	0–0	2–2	0–0	1–2	1–0	1–0	2–2	0–0	1–1	2–1	0–3		1–1	2–1	1–0	1–0	0–1
İstanbulspor	1–0	4–1	0–0	3–0	0–0	1–0	0–0	2–1	0–2	0–2	0–2	1–1		2–0	0–0	1–1	2–0
İzmirspor	0–0	0–2	1–1	1–2	0–0	0–0	0–0	1–2	0–0	0–3	1–2	1–0	2–0		1–0	1–1	1–1
Karşıyaka	1–0	1–1	0–1	1–1	0–1	2–2	0–0	1–0	2–3	2–1	0–1	0–0	2–1	0–0		0–2	0–1
PTT	2–0	2–1	3–3	0–0	0–2	0–0	1–1	1–1	0–0	2–1	2–0	1–1	2–0	1–1	4–0		1–0
Vefa	0–1	0–0	0–1	2–1	0–1	0–0	2–0	3–0	1–1	0–0	1–1	2–0	1–0	5–0	0–0	0–0	

Source: TFF, Mackolik
Legend: Blue = home team win; Yellow = draw; Red = away team win.
