= 2014–15 Turkish Cup =

Ziraat Turkish Cup
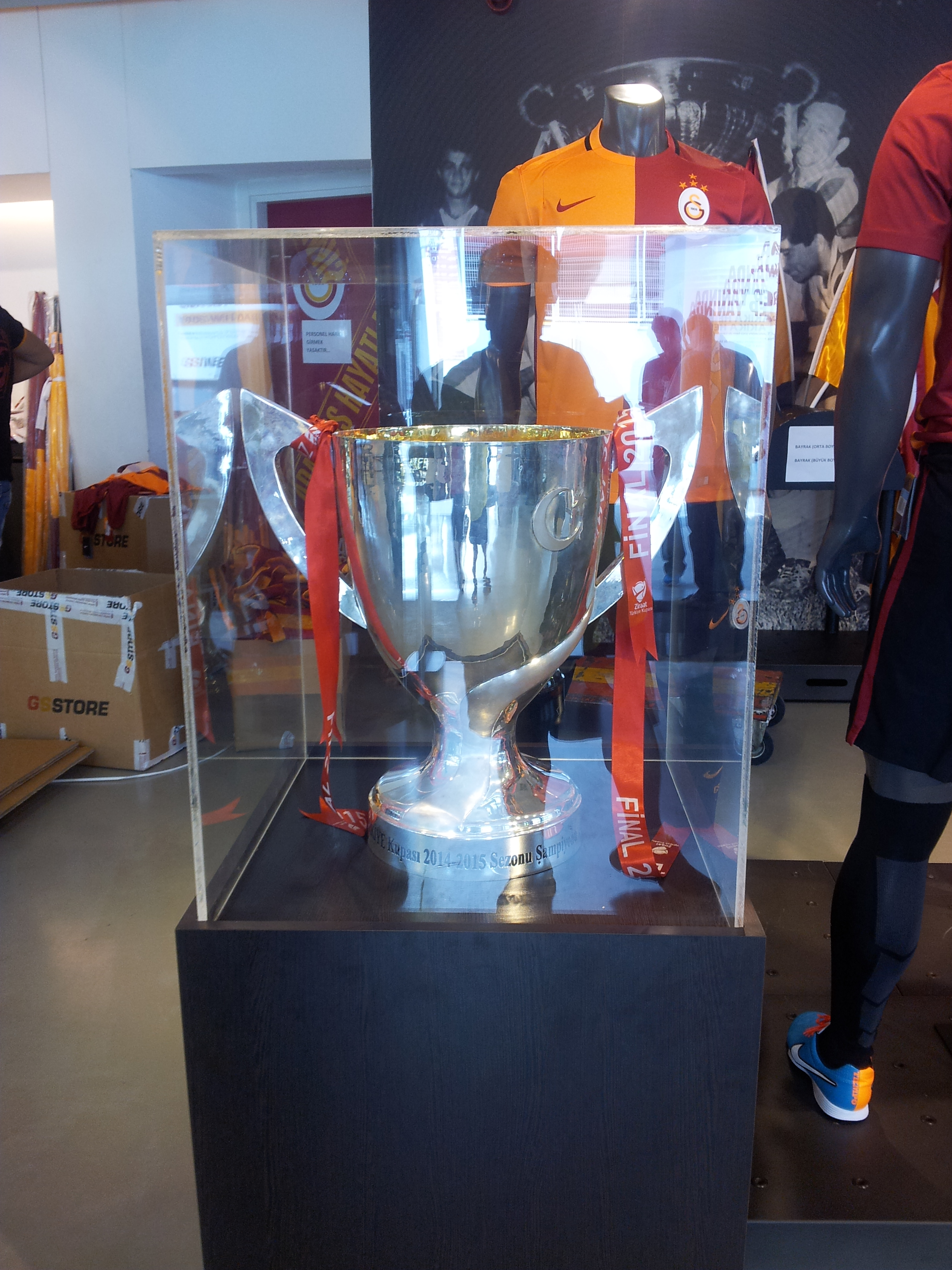
- Picture of the trophy, won by Galatasaray.

Tournament details
- Country: Turkey
- Dates: 3 September 2014 – 3 June 2015
- Teams: 158

Final positions
- Champions: Galatasaray
- Runners-up: Bursaspor

Tournament statistics
- Top goal scorer(s): (France) Cédric Bakambu (8 goals)

The 2014–15 Turkish Cup (Turkish: Türkiye Kupası) is the 53rd season of the Turkish Cup. Ziraat Bankası is the sponsor of the tournament, thus the sponsored name is Ziraat Turkish Cup. The winners will earn a berth in the group stage of the 2015–16 UEFA Europa League, and also qualify for the 2015 Turkish Super Cup.

== Round and draw dates ==
Round	Draw date	Match date(s)	New entries	Fixtures	Clubs	Entering leagues
Preliminary round	18 August 2014	3 September 2014	32	16	159 → 143	Turkish Regional Amateur League
First round	4 September 2014	10 September 2014	54	35	143 → 108	TFF Third League
Second round	16 September 2014	23–25 September 2014	63	49	108 → 59	Süper Lig & TFF First League & TFF Second League
Third round	30 September 2014	28 October–5 November 2014	5	27	59 → 32	Süper Lig
Group stage	7 November 2014	2 December 2014– 5 February 2015	5	96	32 → 16	Süper Lig
Round of 16	7 November 2014	10–12 February 2015	–	8	16 → 8	–
Quarter-finals	17 February 2015	3 March–16 April 2015	–	4	8 → 4	–
Semi-finals	17 February 2015	28 April–21 May 2015	–	2	4 → 2	–
Final	17 February 2015	3 June 2015	–	1	2 → 1	–

== Preliminary round ==
Teams from the Regional Amateur League competed in this round for a place in the first round. All matches were played on 3 September 2014, on the first team's home ground.

Team 1	Score	Team 2
Edirnespor Gençlik (5)	0–2	Beyköy Belediyespor (5)
Tekirdağspor (5)	3–0	Altınova Belediyespor (5)
Karaman Belediyespor (5)	2–1	Uşak Sportif Gençlik Spor (5)
Eğirdirspor (5)	1–5	Bucak Belediye Oğuzhanspor (5)
Bartınspor (5)	3–2	Kastamonuspor 1966 (5)
Sinopspor (5)	1–0(a.e.t.)	Yeni Amasya Spor (5)
Sorgun Belediyespor (5)	2–1	MKE Kırıkkalespor (5)
Nevşehir Spor Gençlik (5)	4–1	Yeşil Kırşehirspor (5)
Mardinspor (5)	2–1	Kilis Belediyespor (5)
Osmaniyespor FK (5)	3–0	Adıyaman İl Özel İdare Spor (5)
Dersimspor (5)	8–1	Hasköy Yıldızspor (5)
12 Bingölspor (5)	6–0	Patnos Gençlik ve Spor (5)
Arhavispor (5)	1–0	Karsspor (5)
Iğdır Aras Spor (5)	3–4	Serhat Ardahanspor (5)
Yüksekova Belediyespor (5)	1–2	Cizrespor (5)
Tatvan Gençlerbirliği Spor (5)	2–1	Kurtalanspor (5)

== First round ==
All matches were played on 10 September 2014 on the first team's home ground. The winners advanced to the second round.

Team 1	Score	Team 2
Bozüyükspor (4)	w/o	Bursa Nilüferspor (4)
İstanbulspor (4)	0–5	Tekirdağspor (5)
Sorgun Belediyespor (5)	0–2	Etimesgut Belediyespor (4)
Eyüpspor (4)	0–0 (a.e.t.) (4–3 p)	Silivrispor (4)
Şekerspor (4)	1–3 (a.e.t.)	Çorum Belediyespor (4)
Halide Edip Adıvarspor (4)	1–3	Gaziosmanpaşaspor (4)
Sinopspor (5)	0–0 (a.e.t.) (2–4 p)	Çankırıspor (4)
İstanbul Güngörenspor (4)	1–0	Çatalcaspor (4)
Bartınspor (5)	2–3	Zonguldak Kömürspor (4)
Gölcükspor (4)	2–1	Maltepespor (4)
Serhat Ardahanspor (5)	1–2	Trabzon Akçaabat (4)
Sakaryaspor (4)	1–1 (a.e.t.) (5–3 p)	Sancaktepe Belediyespor (4)
Arsinspor (4)	0–1	Erzurum Büyükşehir Belediyespor (4)
Derincespor (4)	2–1	Beylerbeyi S.K. (4)
Arhavispor (5)	0–3	Bayburt Grup Özel İdarespor (4)
Tatvan Gençlerbirliği Spor (5)	1–1 (a.e.t.) (3–4 p)	Yeni Diyarbakırspor (4)
Belediye Vanspor (4)	2–3	Batman Petrolspor (4)
12 Bingölspor (5)	1–0	Dersimspor (5)
Erzin Belediyespor (4)	1–0	Osmaniyespor FK (5)
Erzincan Refahiyespor (4)	1–2 (a.e.t.)	Sivas Dört Eylül Belediyespor (4)
Mardinspor (5)	1–4	Cizrespor (5)
Nevşehir Spor Gençlik (5)	0–1 (a.e.t.)	Kahramanmaraş BŞB (4)
Niğde Belediyespor (4)	1–1 (a.e.t.) (5–4 p)	Kayseri Şekerspor (4)
Payas Belediyespor 1975 (4)	1–2	Kırıkhanspor (4)
68 Yeni Aksarayspor (4)	2–0	Karaman Belediyespor (5)
Üsküdar Anadolu SK (4)	1–0 (a.e.t.)	Beyköy Belediyespor (5)
Ankara Demirspor (4)	1–2	Adliyespor (4)
FBM Yaşamspor (4)	1–0	Çine Madranspor (4)
Dardanel Spor A.Ş. (4)	0–1	Ayvalıkgücü Belediyespor (4)
Manavgatspor (4)	2–3	Denizli B.S.K. (4)
Orhangazispor (4)	2–3	Yeşil Bursa SK (4)
Sandıklıspor (4)	1–0 (a.e.t.)	Kızılcabölükspor (4)
Tekirova Belediyespor (4)	2–0	Bucak Belediye Oğuzhanspor (5)
Tirespor 1922 (4)	2–0	Bergama Belediyespor (4)
Tuzlaspor (4)	3–1	Darıca Gençlerbirliği (4)

== Second round ==
All matches were played on 23–25 September 2014 on the first team's home ground. The winners advanced to the third round.

Team 1	Score	Team 2
Tekirdağspor (5)	1–5	Çaykur Rizespor (1)
Trabzon Akçaabat (4)	0–0 (a.e.t.) (4–2 p)	Denizlispor (2)
Bayrampasaspor (3)	1–1 (a.e.t.) (5–4 p)	Adanaspor (2)
Çorum Belediyespor (4)	2–2 (a.e.t.) (3–4 p)	Manisaspor (2)
Yeni Diyarbakırspor (4)	1–2	Samsunspor (2)
Anadolu Selçukluspor (3)	1–2	Gaziantep B.B. (2)
Bucaspor (2)	2–1	Batman Petrolspor (4)
Kayserispor (2)	7–0	Kahramanmaraş BŞB (4)
Osmanlıspor (2)	0–2	Kırıkhanspor (4)
Göztepe Izmir (3)	2–1	Bursa Nilüferspor (4)
Tarsus İdman Yurdu (3)	1–6	Eskişehirspor (1)
Cizrespor (5)	3–1	Aydınspor 1923 (3)
Hacettepe SK (3)	0–0 (a.e.t.) (2–4 p)	Konyaspor (1)
Bayburt Grup Özel İdarespor (4)	1–1 (a.e.t.) (4–2 p)	Pendikspor (3)
Diyarbakir B.B. (3)	4–2 (a.e.t.)	Adliyespor (4)
FBM Yaşamspor (4)	1–1 (a.e.t.) (3–1 p)	Balıkesirspor (1)
Ofspor (3)	1–0	Tirespor 1922 (4)
Bugsaş Spor (3)	0–1 (a.e.t.)	68 Yeni Aksarayspor (4)
Çankırıspor (4)	2–1 (a.e.t.)	Nazilli Belediyespor (3)
Fatih Karagümrük (3)	3–2 (a.e.t.)	Bandirmaspor (3)
Gölbaşıspor (3)	1–1 (a.e.t.) (4–3 p)	Kırklarelispor (3)
Hatayspor (3)	3–1	Gaziosmanpaşaspor (4)
İnegölspor (3)	2–0	Niğde Belediyespor (4)
Keçiörengücü (3)	2–1	Boluspor (2)
Körfez Iskenderunspor (3)	0–1	Alanyaspor (2)
Sakaryaspor (4)	2–2 (a.e.t.) (6–7 p)	Giresunspor (2)
Sandıklıspor (4)	1–0	Kocaeli Birlik SK (3)
Sariyer SK (3)	3–0	Turgutluspor (3)
Tepecikspor (3)	2–0	Üsküdar Anadolu SK (4)
TKI Tavsanli (3)	1–1 (a.e.t.) (6–5 p)	Denizli B.S.K. (4)
Tuzlaspor (4)	2–0	Kartalspor (3)
Ümraniyespor (3)	2–1	Pazarspor (3)
Yeşil Bursa SK (4)	1–3	1461 Trabzon (3)
Zonguldak Kömürspor (4)	4–2	Gümüşhanespor (3)
Kahramanmarasspor (3)	4–2 (a.e.t.)	12 Bingölspor (5)
Yeni Malatyaspor (3)	1–0	Eyüpspor (4)
Adana Demirspor (2)	4–1	İstanbul Güngörenspor (4)
Kayseri Erciyesspor (1)	0–1	Etimesgut Belediyespor (4)
Mersin İdmanyurdu (1)	3–0	Tekirova Belediyespor (4)
Orduspor (2)	2–1 (a.e.t.)	Birlik Nakliyat Düzyurtspor (3)
Altınordu SK (2)	2–0	Menemen Belediyespor (3)
Ankaragücü (3)	2–0	Gölcükspor (4)
Fethiyespor (3)	1–0	Derincespor (4)
Karşıyaka SK (2)	1–1 (a.e.t.) (3–4 p)	Altay SK Izmir (3)
Erzin Belediyespor (4)	0–5	Gaziantepspor (1)
Elazığspor (2)	3–2	Ayvalıkgücü Belediyespor (4)
Şanlıurfaspor (2)	3–3 (a.e.t.) (1–3 p)	Sivas Dört Eylül Belediyespor (4)
Antalyaspor (2)	1–3	Erzurum Büyükşehir Belediyespor (4)
Istanbul Basaksehir (1)	1–0	Tokatspor (3)

== Third round ==
All matches were played from 28 October 2014 to 5 November 2014 on the first team's home ground. The winners advanced to the group stage.

Team 1	Score	Team 2
Cizrespor (5)	2–0	Göztepe Izmir (3)
Tuzlaspor (4)	3–1	Kasımpaşa (1)
Gençlerbirliği (1)	6–0	Etimesgut Belediyespor (4)
Akhisar Belediyespor (1)	2–1 (a.e.t.)	Erzurum Büyükşehir Belediyespor (4)
Kırıkhanspor (4)	0–4	Eskişehirspor (1)
1461 Trabzon (3)	0–1	Sivas Dört Eylül Belediyespor (4)
Keçiörengücü (3)	1–0 (a.e.t.)	Fethiyespor (3)
Diyarbakır B.B. (3)	3–2 (a.e.t.)	Alanyaspor (2)
Kahramanmaraşspor (3)	1–3	Fatih Karagümrük (3)
Bayrampaşaspor (3)	0–1	Giresunspor (2)
Çankırıspor (4)	2–3	Gaziantepspor (1)
TKI Tavsanli (3)	0–2	Ankaragücü (3)
Gaziantep B.B. (2)	1–0	68 Yeni Aksarayspor (4)
Samsunspor (2)	0–0 (a.e.t.) (4–1 p)	Yeni Malatyaspor (3)
Altınordu SK (2)	1–0	Ofspor (3)
Bursaspor (1)	2–0	Tepecikspor (3)
Çaykur Rizespor (1)	4–1	Trabzon Akçaabat (4)
İnegölspor (3)	2–2 (a.e.t.) (2–4 p)	Kardemir Karabükspor (1)
Sariyer SK (3)	1–0	Orduspor (2)
Gölbaşıspor (3)	0–0 (a.e.t.) (3–4 p)	Kayserispor (2)
Altay SK Izmir (3)	1–2	Konyaspor (1)
Mersin İdmanyurdu (1)	2–0	Hatayspor (3)
Bayburt Grup Özel İdarespor (4)	2–2 (a.e.t.) (5–4 p)	Bucaspor (2)
FBM Yaşamspor (4)	1–0 (a.e.t.)	Elazığspor (2)
Manisaspor (2)	2–1	Zonguldak Kömürspor (4)
Adana Demirspor (2)	2–0	Sandıklıspor (4)
İstanbul Başakşehir (1)	3–1 (a.e.t.)	Ümraniyespor (3)

== Group stage ==
The top five teams from the 2013–14 Süper Lig joined the 27 winners from the third round for the group stage. The group draw commenced on 7 November 2014, as 32 teams were split into eight groups of four. This stage was a round-robin tournament with home and away matches, in the vein of UEFA European competitions' group stages. Group stage matches began on 2 December 2014 and concluded on 5 February 2015. The winners and runners-up of the two groups advanced to the round of 16.

=== Group A ===
Pos	Team	Pld	W	D	L	GF	GA	GD	Pts	TUZ	SIV	GAZ	GBB
1	Tuzlaspor	6	4	1	1	13	10	+3	13		3–1	2–1	3–1
2	Sivasspor	6	4	0	2	13	6	+7	12	3–0		1–2	4–0
3	Gaziantepspor	6	2	2	2	8	8	0	8	2–2	0–2		0–0
4	Gaziantep B.B.	6	0	1	5	5	15	−10	1	2–3	1–2	1–3	

Legend: Blue = home team win; Yellow = draw; Red = away team win.

1 December 2014	Gaziantep B.B.	2–3	Tuzlaspor	Gaziantep
	Iravul 53', 69'	Report	Alaeddinoğlu 32', 78' (pen.); Baydemir 80'	Stadium: Gaskispor Tesisleri 1 Referee: Halil Umut Meler

3 December 2014	Sivasspor	1–2	Gaziantepspor	Sivas
	Aras 57' (pen.)	Report	Şen 83'; Yılmaz 90+3'	Stadium: Sivas 4 Eylül Stadium; Referee: Suleyman Abay

15 December 2014	Tuzlaspor	3–1	Sivasspor	Istanbul
	Özen 18', 45'; Alkan 55'	Report	Neziroğluları 71'	Stadium: Tuzla Belediyesi Stadı; Referee: Ferhan Kestanlioglu

17 December 2014	Gaziantepspor	0–0	Gaziantep B.B.	Gaziantep
		Report		Stadium: Gaziantep Kamil Ocak Stadium; Referee: Bulent Birincioglu

24 December 2014	Sivasspor	4–0	Gaziantep B.B.	Sivas
	Karadeniz 14'; Chahechouhe 17', 34'; Yılmazer 39'	Report		Stadium: Sivas 4 Eylül Stadium; Referee: Alper Ulusoy

25 December 2014	Gaziantepspor	2–2	Tuzlaspor	Gaziantep
	Akın 28'; Çağlayan 52'	Report	Alkan 12'; Alaeddinoğlu 73'	Stadium: Gaziantep Kamil Ocak Stadium; Referee: Ozguc Turkalp

31 December 2014	Tuzlaspor	2–1	Gaziantepspor	Istanbul
	Alaeddinoğlu 32'; Kara 67'		Yılmaz 22'	Stadium: Tuzla Belediyesi Stadı; Referee: Mustafa İlker Coşkun

31 December 2014	Gaziantep B.B.	1–2	Sivasspor	Gaziantep
	Candemir 42'		Aras 8'; Da Costa 25'	Stadium: Gaziantep Kamil Ocak Stadium; Referee: Hakan Ceylan

=== Group B ===
Pos	Team	Pld	W	D	L	GF	GA	GD	Pts	TRA	MAN	KEÇ	AKH
1	Trabzonspor	6	3	3	0	14	1	+13	12		9–0	0–0	0–0
2	Manisaspor	6	2	1	3	6	16	−10	7	0–2		1–0	1–1
3	Keçiörengücü	6	1	3	2	5	6	−1	6	1–1	1–2		1–1
4	Akhisar Belediyespor	6	1	3	2	6	8	−2	6	0–2	3–2	1–2	

Legend: Blue = home team win; Yellow = draw; Red = away team win.

2 December 2014	Akhisar Belediyespor	3–2	Manisaspor	Manisa
	Konuk 34'; Bruno Mezenga 90'; Ntibazonkiza 90+3'		Sazdağı 76'; Milijaš 86'	Stadium: Manisa 19 Mayıs Stadium; Referee: Yasar Kemal Ugurlu

4 December 2014	Keçiörengücü	1–1	Trabzonspor	Ankara
	Koçal 82'		Waris 90+4'	Stadium: Osmanlı Stadyumu; Referee: Ferhan Kestanlioglu

17 December 2014	Manisaspor	1–0	Keçiörengücü	Manisa
	Cora 45+1'			Stadium: Manisa 19 Mayıs Stadium; Referee: Bahattin Simsek

18 December 2014	Trabzonspor	0–0	Akhisar Belediyespor	Trabzon
				Stadium: Hüseyin Avni Aker Stadium; Referee: Hakan Ceylan

25 December 2014	Keçiörengücü	1–1	Akhisar Belediyespor	Ankara
	Koçal 34'		Köse 5'	Stadium: Ankara Aktepe Stadium; Referee: Onur Karabas

25 December 2014	Trabzonspor	9–0	Manisaspor	Trabzon
	Aydoğdu 13', 46', 49'; Cardozo 36', 72'; Gürler 53'; Waris 54', 79'; Doğan 69'			Stadium: Hüseyin Avni Aker Stadium; Referee: Deniz Ateş Bitnel

31 December 2014	Akhisar Belediyespor	1–2	Keçiörengücü	Manisa
	Konuk 84'		Koçal 1', 54'	Stadium: Manisa 19 Mayıs Stadium; Referee: Ferhan Kestanlıoğlu

1 January 2015	Manisaspor	0–2	Trabzonspor	Manisa
			Gürler 13'; Yatabaré 18'	Stadium: Manisa 19 Mayıs Stadium; Referee: Alper Ulusoy

=== Group C ===
Pos	Team	Pld	W	D	L	GF	GA	GD	Pts	BUR	MİY	FK	SAM
1	Bursaspor	6	3	3	0	14	5	+9	12		1–1	3–0	1–1
2	Mersin İdmanyurdu	6	2	2	2	8	9	−1	8	0–5		3–0	3–1
3	Fatih Karagümrük	6	2	1	3	3	10	−7	7	1–1	1–0		0–3
4	Samsunspor	6	1	2	3	8	9	−1	5	2–3	1–1	0–1	

Legend: Blue = home team win; Yellow = draw; Red = away team win.

3 December 2014	Samsunspor	0–1	Fatih Karagümrük	Samsun
			Dursun 15'	Stadium: Samsun 19 Mayıs Stadium; Referee: Ozer Ozden

10 December 2014	Bursaspor	1–1	Mersin İdmanyurdu	Bursa
	Çinaz 20'		Varol 23'	Stadium: Bursa Atatürk Stadium; Referee: Ozguc Turkalp

16 December 2014	Fatih Karagümrük	1–1	Bursaspor	Karagümrük
	Kuçik 6'		Şen 79'	Stadium: Vefa Stadium; Referee: Koray Gencerler

17 December 2014	Mersin İdmanyurdu	3–1	Samsunspor	Mersin
	Demirhan 25'; Varol 35'; Futács 90+3'		Serbest 31'	Stadium: Tevfik Sırrı Gür Stadium; Referee: Yunus Yildirim

23 December 2014	Fatih Karagümrük	1–0	Mersin İdmanyurdu	Istanbul
	Aktaş 27'			Stadium: Vefa Stadium; Referee: Huseyin Sabanci

24 December 2014	Samsunspor	2–3	Bursaspor	Samsun
	Serbest 12', 53'		Josué 26', 57'; Fernandão 90'	Stadium: Samsun 19 Mayıs Stadium; Referee: Mustafa Ogretmenoglu

31 December 2014	Bursaspor	1–1	Samsunspor	Bursa
	Ceylan 35' (o.g.)		Adilović 54'	Stadium: Bursa Atatürk Stadium; Referee: Bülent Birincioğlu

1 January 2015	Mersin İdmanyurdu	3–0	Fatih Karagümrük	Mersin
	Welliton 47'; Pedriel 50'; Varol 62'			Stadium: Tevfik Sırrı Gür Stadium; Referee: Yunus Yıldırım

=== Group D ===
Pos	Team	Pld	W	D	L	GF	GA	GD	Pts	KAR	İBŞ	ANK	SDE
1	Kardemir Karabükspor	6	4	1	1	12	6	+6	13		2–2	2–0	2–1
2	İstanbul Başakşehir	6	2	3	1	9	8	+1	9	1–2		3–2	0–0
3	Ankaragücü	6	1	2	3	6	11	−5	5	0–3	1–1		1–1
4	Sivas Dört Eylül Belediyespor	6	1	2	3	6	8	−2	5	2–1	1–2	1–2	

Legend: Blue = home team win; Yellow = draw; Red = away team win.

2 December 2014	İstanbul Başakşehir	3–2	Ankaragücü	Istanbul
	Öztürk 46'; Sokullu 56'; Şahin 90+4'		Erdem Uğurlu 79'; Gülpınar 89'	Stadium: Başakşehir Fatih Terim Stadium; Referee: Umit Öztürk

3 December 2014	Sivas Dört Eylül Belediyespor	2–1	Kardemir Karabükspor	Sivas
	Inday 38'; Mursal 41'		Akpala 65'	Stadium: Muhsin Yazıcıoğlu Stadyumu; Referee: Serkan Tokat

17 December 2014	Kardemir Karabükspor	2–2	İstanbul Başakşehir	Karabük
	Ağçay 26' (o.g.); Abdou Razack Traoré 80'		Batdal 54'; Pektürk 85'	Stadium: Dr. Necmettin Şeyhoğlu Stadium; Referee: Koray Gencerler

18 December 2014	Ankaragücü	1–1	Sivas Dört Eylül Belediyespor	Ankara
	Nayir 42'		Emir 11'	Stadium: Ankara 19 Mayıs Stadium; Referee: Huseyin Ciftsuren

23 December 2014	Ankaragücü	0–3	Kardemir Karabükspor	Ankara
			Koçaklı 1'; Özkan 13'; Akgün 28'	Stadium: Ankara 19 Mayıs Stadium; Referee: Abdulkadir Bitigen

24 December 2014	İstanbul Başakşehir	0–0	Sivas Dört Eylül Belediyespor	Istanbul
				Stadium: Recep Tayyip Erdoğan Stadium; Referee: Mustafa Ilker Coskun

30 December 2014	Sivas Dört Eylül Belediyespor	1–2	İstanbul Başakşehir	Sivas
	Mursal 61'		Cansev 47', 78'	Stadium: Muhsin Yazıcıoğlu Stadyumu; Referee: Serkan Çınar

30 December 2014	Kardemir Karabükspor	2–0	Ankaragücü	Karabük
	Özkan 48'; Ayık 90+1'			Stadium: Dr. Necmettin Şeyhoğlu Stadium; Referee: Kutluhan Bilgiç

=== Group E ===
Pos	Team	Pld	W	D	L	GF	GA	GD	Pts	KAY	FEN	BAY	ALT
1	Kayserispor	6	3	2	1	11	7	+4	11		1–1	2–2	3–0
2	Fenerbahçe	6	3	2	1	13	6	+7	11	1–2		5–0	1–1
3	Bayburt Grup Özel İdarespor	6	2	1	3	9	12	−3	7	3–0	1–3		3–1
4	Altınordu	6	1	1	4	4	12	−8	4	0–3	1–2	1–0	

Legend: Blue = home team win; Yellow = draw; Red = away team win.

2 December 2014	Fenerbahçe	1–2	Kayserispor	Istanbul
	Koca 31'		Şahin 39'; Simić 89'	Stadium: Şükrü Saracoğlu Stadium; Referee: Serkan Cinar

2 December 2014	Altınordu	1–0	Bayburt Grup Özel İdarespor	Sivas
	Akyel 48' (pen.)			Stadium: İzmir Atatürk Stadium; Referee: Ramazan Keles

15 December 2014	Bayburt Grup Özel İdarespor	1–3	Fenerbahçe	Bayburt
	Seker 45' (pen.)		Webó 2', 34'; Topuz 65'	Stadium: Genç Osman Stadyumu; Referee: Serkan Serkan

16 December 2014	Kayserispor	3–0	Altınordu	Kayseri
	Arıca 74'; Adıcan 84'; Babacar 86'			Stadium: Kadir Has Stadium; Referee: Caner Ak

23 December 2014	Fenerbahçe	1–1	Altınordu	Istanbul
	Diego 81'		Balcı 50'	Stadium: Şükrü Saracoğlu Stadium; Referee: Cagatay Sahan

24 December 2014	Kayserispor	2–2	Bayburt Grup Özel İdarespor	Kayseri
	Değirmencioğlu 35'; Ekinci 90'		Kabadayı 55'; Ilgaz 57'	Stadium: Kadir Has Stadium; Referee: Murat Turker

31 December 2014	Bayburt Grup Özel İdarespor	3–0	Kayserispor	Bayburt
	Kabadayı 61'; Özkan 62', 65'			Stadium: Genç Osman Stadyumu; Referee: Mustafa Aydın

20 January 2015	Altınordu	1–2	Fenerbahçe	İzmir
	Balcı 45+3'		Topuz 33'; Abdioğlu 79' (o.g.)	Stadium: İzmir Atatürk Stadium; Referee: Koray Gençerler

=== Group F ===
Pos	Team	Pld	W	D	L	GF	GA	GD	Pts	RIZ	BJK	ADD	SAR
1	Çaykur Rizespor	6	4	2	0	7	2	+5	14		0–0	2–1	1–0
2	Beşiktaş	6	3	1	2	12	5	+7	10	0–1		1–2	3–1
3	Adana Demirspor	6	2	1	3	8	11	−3	7	1–1	1–4		1–0
4	Sarıyer	6	1	0	5	4	13	−9	3	0–2	0–4	3–2	

Legend: Blue = home team win; Yellow = draw; Red = away team win.

3 December 2014	Çaykur Rizespor	2–1	Adana Demirspor	Rize
	Sylvestre 10'; Kweuke 67'		Özcan 37'	Stadium: Yeni Rize Şehir Stadı; Referee: Kutluhan Bilgic

3 December 2014	Sarıyer	0–4	Beşiktaş	Istanbul
			Tosun 4', 66'; Şahan 10'; Ramon 49'	Stadium: Yusuf Ziya Öniş Stadium; Referee: Ozguc Turkalp

17 December 2014	Adana Demirspor	1–0	Sarıyer	Adana
	Şimşek 22'			Stadium: Adana 5 Ocak Stadium; Referee: Omer Faruk Ocak

18 December 2014	Beşiktaş	0–1	Çaykur Rizespor	Istanbul
			LuaLua 43'	Stadium: Atatürk Olympic Stadium; Referee: Yasar Kemal Ugurlu

24 December 2014	Beşiktaş	1–2	Adana Demirspor	Istanbul
	Töre 70'		Özgöz 14'; Bardakcı 59'	Stadium: Yusuf Ziya Öniş Stadium; Referee: Suat Arslanboga

25 December 2014	Sarıyer	0–2	Çaykur Rizespor	Istanbul
			Kadah 12'; Köse 45'	Stadium: Yusuf Ziya Öniş Stadium; Referee: Sarper Barış Saka

31 December 2014	Çaykur Rizespor	1–0	Sarıyer	Rize
	Kadah 75'			Stadium: Yeni Rize Şehir Stadı; Referee: Serkan Tokat

21 January 2015	Adana Demirspor	1–4	Beşiktaş	Adana
	Aynaoğlu 10'		Bardakcı 7' (o.g.); Ba 70'; Nukan 76'; Tosun 83'	Stadium: Adana 5 Ocak Stadium; Referee: Barış Şimşek

=== Group G ===
Pos	Team	Pld	W	D	L	GF	GA	GD	Pts	GAL	ESK	DBB	FBM
1	Galatasaray	6	4	0	2	20	8	+12	12		4–2	0–2	3–1
2	Eskişehirspor	6	4	0	2	11	6	+5	12	1–0		3–0	3–0
3	Diyarbakır B.B.	6	2	2	2	7	10	−3	8	1–4	1–0		2–2
4	FBM Yaşamspor	6	0	2	4	6	20	−14	2	1–9	1–2	1–1	

Legend: Blue = home team win; Yellow = draw; Red = away team win.

2 December 2014	Diyarbakır B.B.	2–2	FBM Yaşamspor	Diyarbakır
	Shahini 19'; Eren 89' (pen.)		Arı 3'; Sahat 13'	Stadium: Seyrantepe Spor Kompleksi Stadyumu 1 Referee: Çağdaş Altay

3 December 2014	Galatasaray	4–2	Eskişehirspor	Istanbul
	İnan 15', 36' (pen.); Bruma 82'; Bulut 89'		Özkan 5'; Şentürk 61'	Stadium: Türk Telekom Arena; Referee: Ali Palabıyık

16 December 2014	FBM Yaşamspor	1–9	Galatasaray	İzmir
	Yeğin 10'		Pandev 28', 39', 45+1'; Hamit Altıntop 32' (pen.); Adın 42', 82'; Gümüş 62'; Kurtuluş 80', 90'	Stadium: İzmir Atatürk Stadium; Referee: Saperbaris Saka

17 December 2014	Eskişehirspor	3–0	Diyarbakır B.B.	Eskişehir
	Dabanlı 25'; Funes 56'; Şişmanoğlu 90+2'			Stadium: Eskişehir Atatürk Stadium; Referee: Kutluhan Bilgic

23 December 2014	Diyarbakır B.B.	1–4	Galatasaray	Diyarbakır
	Koç 43'		Pandev 31'; Bruma 69'; Adın 82'; Kurtuluş 85'	Stadium: Diyarbakır Atatürk Stadium; Referee: Yunus Yildirim

23 December 2014	FBM Yaşamspor	1–2	Eskişehirspor	Ulucak Cumhuriye
	Mest 54'		Aydın 69'; Zengin 80'	Stadium: Ulucak Stadı; Referee: Bulent Birincioglu

16 January 2015	Eskişehirspor	3–0	FBM Yaşamspor	Antalya
	Özkan 41' (pen.); Güleryüz 72'; Serbest 86' (o.g.)			Stadium: Mardan Sports Complex; Referee: Abdulkadir Bitigen

22 January 2015	Galatasaray	0–2	Diyarbakır B.B.	Istanbul
			Çapar 3'; Yagmur 90+2'	Stadium: Türk Telekom Arena; Referee: Volkan Bayarslan

=== Group H ===
Pos	Team	Pld	W	D	L	GF	GA	GD	Pts	GEN	KON	CIZ	GIR
1	Gençlerbirliği	6	3	3	0	10	3	+7	12		2–0	4–0	0–0
2	Konyaspor	6	2	1	3	10	7	+3	7	0–0		7–1	1–2
3	Cizrespor	6	2	1	3	6	14	−8	7	1–2	2–0		0–0
4	Giresunspor	6	1	3	2	5	7	−2	6	2–2	0–2	1–2	

Legend: Blue = home team win; Yellow = draw; Red = away team win.

2 December 2014	Konyaspor	1–2	Giresunspor	Selçuklu
	Vuković 31' (pen.)		Bakir 7'; Muriqi 73'	Stadium: New Konya Stadium; Referee: Ozkan Celiker

8 December 2014	Cizrespor	1–2	Gençlerbirliği	Cizre
	Doğan 31'		Tosun 11'; Akcakin 32'	Stadium: Cizre İlçe Stadı; Referee: Adem Elgörmüş

16 December 2014	Gençlerbirliği	2–0	Konyaspor	Ankara
	Tosun 13'; Akcakin 60'			Stadium: Ankara 19 Mayıs Stadium; Referee: Mustafa Aydın

17 December 2014	Giresunspor	1–2	Cizrespor	Giresun
	Aktaş 90+7'		Doğan 13'; Yilmaz 43' (pen.)	Stadium: Giresun Atatürk Stadium; Referee: Burak Taskinsoy

23 December 2014	Giresunspor	2–2	Gençlerbirliği	Giresun
	Muriqi 19'; Aktaş 31'		Koçer 71'; Kahveci 81'	Stadium: Giresun Atatürk Stadium; Referee: Serkan Cinar

24 December 2014	Konyaspor	7–1	Cizrespor	Selçuklu
	Kabze 18'; Şahiner 32'; Bora 35'; Güven 67'; Djalma 79'; İnceman 88'; Aydın 90'		Traoré 73'	Stadium: New Konya Stadium; Referee: Hakan Ceylan

30 December 2014	Gençlerbirliği	0–0	Giresunspor	Ankara
				Stadium: Ankara 19 Mayıs Stadium; Referee: Abdullah Yılmaz

31 December 2014	Cizrespor	2–0	Konyaspor	Cizre
	Dijehoua 31'; Doğan 52'			Stadium: Cizre İlçe Stadı; Referee: Murat Türker

== Bracket ==
First round
1	Galatasaray	4
16	Konyaspor	1
8	Tuzlaspor	1
9	Manisaspor	3
5	Kayserispor	1
12	Beşiktaş	0
4	Trabzonspor	2
13	Sivasspor (a.e.t.)	3
6	Bursaspor (p)	1(3)
11	İstanbul Başakşehir	1(2)
3	Gençlerbirliği	3
14	Eskişehirspor	0
7	Kardemir Karabükspor	2
10	Mersin İdmanyurdu (a.e.t.)	4
2	Çaykur Rizespor	1
15	Fenerbahçe	4

Quarter-finals
Galatasaray	4	1	5
Manisaspor	0	1	1
Kayserispor	1	1	2(1)
Sivasspor (p)	1	1	2(3)
Bursaspor	1	3	4
Gençlerbirliği	1	2	3
Mersin İdmanyurdu	1	1	2
Fenerbahçe	2	4	6

Semi-finals
Galatasaray	4	1	5
Sivasspor	1	2	3
Bursaspor	1	3	4
Fenerbahçe	2	0	2

Final
Galatasaray	3
Bursaspor	2

== Round of 16 ==
Group winners and runners-up faced each other in the round of 16. All matches were played from 10 to 12 February 2015. One-legged matches were played in the group winners' home ground. Extra time and a penalty shoot-out would commence if the score was level at the end of 90 minutes.

10 February 2015	Trabzonspor (1)	2–3 (a.e.t.)	Sivasspor (1)	Trabzon
20:30 EET (UTC+02)	Yatabaré 23', 32'	Report (in Turkish)	Utaka 10'; Yılmazer 40'; Chahechouhe 120'	Stadium: Hüseyin Avni Aker Stadium; Attendance: 20,000; Referee: Mete Kalkavan

11 February 2015	Kardemir Karabükspor (1)	2–4 (a.e.t.)	Mersin İdmanyurdu (1)	Karabük
14:00 EET (UTC+02)	Kumbela 2'; Özek 15'	Report (in Turkish)	Pedriel 3', 94'; Tita 69'; Kaloğlu 114'	Stadium: Dr. Necmettin Şeyhoğlu Stadium; Attendance: 800; Referee: Mustafa İlker Coşkun

11 February 2015	Bursaspor (1)	1–1 (a.e.t.) (3–2 p)	İstanbul Başakşehir (1)	Bursa
16:00 EET (UTC+02)	Çinaz 92'	Report (in Turkish)	Batdal 97'	Stadium: Bursa Atatürk Stadium; Attendance: 5,000; Referee: Cüneyt Çakır
	Penalties
	Belluschi (penalty missed); Holmén (penalty scored); Civelli (penalty missed); Fernandão (penalty scored); Josué (penalty scored)		(penalty missed) Batdal; (penalty scored) Višća; (penalty scored) Epureanu; (penalty missed) Erdem; (penalty missed) Cansev

11 February 2015	Kayserispor (2)	1–0	Beşiktaş (1)	Kayseri
18:00 EET (UTC+02)	Taşdemir 39' (pen.)	Report (in Turkish)		Stadium: Kadir Has Stadium; Attendance: 12,500; Referee: Özgür Yankaya

11 February 2015	Çaykur Rizespor (1)	1–4	Fenerbahçe (1)	Rize
20:45 EET (UTC+02)	Ovacıklı 61'	Report (in Turkish)	Kadlec 24'; İrtegün 68'; Topal 86'; Sow 88'	Stadium: Yeni Rize Şehir Stadı; Attendance: 6,800; Referee: Ali Palabıyık

12 February 2015	Tuzlaspor (4)	1–3	Manisaspor (2)	Istanbul
13:30 EET (UTC+02)	Alaeddinoğlu 69'	Report (in Turkish)	Barış 49'; Subašić 65'; Yeğin 87'	Stadium: Tuzla Belediye Stadı; Attendance: 300; Referee: Suat Arslanboğa

12 February 2015	Gençlerbirliği (1)	3–0	Eskişehirspor (1)	Ankara
17:00 EET (UTC+02)	Landel 24'; Stancu 79'; Petrović 82'	Report (in Turkish)		Stadium: Ankara 19 Mayıs Stadium; Attendance: 2,500; Referee: Fırat Aydınus

12 February 2015	Galatasaray (1)	4–1	Konyaspor (1)	Istanbul
19:00 EET (UTC+02)	Yılmaz 10'; Sneijder 16', 34'; Adın 45'	Report (in Turkish)	Marica 20'	Stadium: Türk Telekom Arena; Attendance: 7,500; Referee: İlker Meral

== Quarter-finals ==
The winners of the round of 16 matches were drawn against each other via a seeding system based on their previous seasons' league performances. The quarter-finals were played in two-legged matches.

=== First leg ===
3 March 2015 Quarter-final	Galatasaray (1)	4–0	Manisaspor (2)	Istanbul
20:30 EET (UTC+02)	Džemaili 34'; Çolak 40' (pen.); Pandev 68', 88'	Report (in Turkish)		Stadium: Türk Telekom Arena; Attendance: 7,500; Referee: Mustafa Kamil Abitoğlu

4 March 2015 Quarter-final	Bursaspor (1)	1–1	Gençlerbirliği (1)	Bursa
18:30 EET (UTC+02)	Aziz 59'	Report (in Turkish)	Çelik 49'	Stadium: Bursa Atatürk Stadium; Attendance: 14,000; Referee: İlker Meral

4 March 2015 Quarter-final	Mersin İdmanyurdu (1)	1–2	Fenerbahçe (1)	Mersin
20:30 EET (UTC+02)	Welliton 74'	Report (in Turkish)	Diego 44'; Sow 45'	Stadium: Tevfik Sırrı Gür Stadium; Attendance: 9,200; Referee: Yunus Yıldırım

18 March 2015 Quarter-final	Kayserispor (2)	1–1	Sivasspor (1)	Kayseri
19:30 EET (UTC+02)	Birinci 48'	Report (in Turkish)	Karadeniz 20'	Stadium: Kadir Has Stadium; Attendance: 4,500; Referee: Özgür Yankaya

=== Second leg ===
14 April 2015 Quarter-final	Gençlerbirliği (1)	2–3 (3–4 agg.)	Bursaspor (1)	Ankara
18:45 EEST (UTC+03)	Petrović 15'; El Kabir 39'	Report (in Turkish)	Şen 59', 73'; Fernandão 90'	Stadium: Ankara 19 Mayıs Stadium; Attendance: 9,000; Referee: Halis Özkahya

15 April 2015 Quarter-final	Manisaspor (2)	1–1 (1–5 agg.)	Galatasaray (1)	Manisa
19:45 EEST (UTC+03)	Turan 76'	Report (in Turkish)	Kurtuluş 1'	Stadium: Manisa 19 Mayıs Stadium; Attendance: 5,500; Referee: Alper Ulusoy

16 April 2015 Quarter-final	Sivasspor (1)	1–1 (a.e.t.) (2–2 agg.) (3–1 p)	Kayserispor (2)	Sivas
18:00 EEST (UTC+03)	Chahechouhe 45'	Report (in Turkish)	Bobô 90' (pen.)	Stadium: Sivas 4 Eylül Stadium; Attendance: 10,000; Referee: Süleyman Abay
	Penalties
	Bekmezci (penalty missed); Eşer (penalty scored); Öztürk (penalty scored); Akın (penalty missed); Chahechouhe (penalty scored)		(penalty missed) Bobô; (penalty missed) Mijailović; (penalty scored) Şahin; (penalty missed) Birinci

16 April 2015 Quarter-final	Fenerbahçe (1)	4–1 (6–2 agg.)	Mersin İdmanyurdu (1)	Istanbul
19:45 EEST (UTC+03)	Kuyt 6', 31' (pen.); Kaldırım 49'; Erkin 61'	Report (in Turkish)	Futács 72'	Stadium: Şükrü Saracoğlu Stadium; Attendance: 3,500; Referee: Mustafa İlker Coşkun

== Semi-finals ==
The semi-finals were played in two-legged matches. All teams remaining in competition were Süper Lig teams, playing in the top flight of Turkish football league system.

=== First leg ===
28 April 2015 Semi-final	Bursaspor	1–2	Fenerbahçe	Bursa
20:30 EEST (UTC+03)	Belluschi 33'	Report (in Turkish)	Emenike 26'; Alves 36'	Stadium: Bursa Atatürk Stadium; Attendance: 24,000; Referee: Cüneyt Çakır

30 April 2015 Semi-final	Galatasaray	4–1	Sivasspor	Istanbul
20:30 EEST (UTC+03)	Sarıoğlu 31'; Felipe Melo 35'; Sneijder 63'; İnan 77' (pen.)	Report (in Turkish)	Utaka 8'	Stadium: Türk Telekom Arena; Attendance: 13,500; Referee: İlker Meral

=== Second leg ===
19 May 2015 Semi-final	Sivasspor	2–1 (3–5 agg.)	Galatasaray	Sivas
20:30 EEST (UTC+03)	Karadeniz 69', 73'	Report (in Turkish)	Çolak 84' (pen.)	Stadium: Sivas 4 Eylül Stadium; Attendance: 11,000; Referee: Mustafa İlker Coşkun

21 May 2015 Semi-final	Fenerbahçe	0–3 (2–4 agg.)	Bursaspor	Istanbul
20:30 EEST (UTC+03)		Report (in Turkish)	Şen 33'; Fernandão 76'; Çinaz 84'	Stadium: Şükrü Saracoğlu Stadium; Attendance: 17,500; Referee: Bülent Yıldırım

== Final ==
The final was contested in Bursa as a one-off match. The winners were awarded fifty medals per club along with the Turkish Cup trophy.

3 June 2015 Final	Galatasaray	3–2	Bursaspor	Bursa
20:30 EEST (UTC+03)	Yılmaz 40', 48', 60'	Report (in Turkish)	Fernandão 27' (pen.); Şen 58'	Stadium: Bursa Atatürk Stadium; Attendance: 24,500; Referee: Bülent Yıldırım; Man of the Match: Burak Yılmaz

== See also ==
- 2014–15 Süper Lig
- 2014–15 TFF First League
- 2014–15 TFF Second League
- 2014–15 TFF Third League
