= Cansu Tiryaki =

Turkish football referee (born 1990)

- Born: 1990 (age 35–36); Edirne, Turkey
- Other occupation: School teacher

Domestic
Years	League	Role
2011	Women's First League	Ass. referee
2012-2014	Amateur Second Division	Ass. referee
2013	Amatreur Division	Ass. referee
2013-2014	TFF Third League	Ass. referee
2014	U21 League	Ass. referee
2015	Regional Amateur League	Ass. referee
2015-	U21 League	Referee
2015-	Regional Amateur League	Referee
2015-	U21 League	Fourth official
2015-	TFF Third League	Fourth official

International
Years	League	Role
2019	ISF World Schools Championship	Referee
2019	UEFA Women's Under-17 Championship qualification	Referee
2019	UEFA Women's Champions League	Fourth official
2020	UEFA Women's Euro qualifying	Fourth official, Referee

Cansu Tiryaki (born 1990), misspelled as Cansu Tryak, is a Turkish FIFA listed football referee. She is a native of Edirne, Turkey, where she works as a school teacher.

== Personal life ==
Cansu Tiryaki was born in Edirne, Turkey in 1990. She was married to Yusuf Tiryaki, a former assistant referee, who died after a heart attack in March 2023.

She works as a primary school teacher in Bağcılar, Istanbul.

== Officiating career ==
=== Domestic ===
Tiryaki started her officiating career as an assistant referee in the 2011-12 Turkish Women's First Football League match on 3 December 2011. She served in this position in various league levels such as Amateur Second Division (2012–2014), Regional Amateur League (2012–2015), Amatreur Division (2013), TFF Third League (2013–2014) and U21 League (2014). Her promotion to referee status was in a U21 League match on 29 August 2015. She officiated from then on in the Regional Amateur League and U21 League. In an U21 League match played on 20 September 2015, she served for the first time as a fourth official. She is still appointed in this position also in the TFF Third League matches. As of 15 March 2020, Tiryaki officiated a total of 84 matches in different roles.

=== International ===
Tiryaki debuted internationally in the friendly boys' U16 match between Turkey and Georgia on 12 April 2018. She was named FIFA listed referee for 2018, 2019 and 2020. She served at the 2019 ISF World Schools Championship Football in Belgrade, Serbia. She officiated in two matches at the 2020 UEFA Women's Under-17 Championship qualification matches in Machico, Madeira and Camacha, Portugal. At the second leg match of the 2019–20 UEFA Women's Champions League - Round of 32 between VfL Wolfsburg and KFF Mitrovica on 25 September 2019, she served as the fourth official. She was the fourth official of the UEFA Women's Euro 2021 qualifying Group B match between Malta and Bosnia and Herzegovina on 10 March 2020. On 3 September that year, she officiated the UEFA Women's Euro 2021 qualifying Group B match between Bosnia and Herzegovina and Malta held in Sarajevo, Bosnia and Herzegovina.
