= Yılmazer =

Yılmazer is a Turkish surname. Notable people with the surname include:

- Kerem Yılmazer (born 1946), Turkish actor and singer
- Musa Sinan Yılmazer (born 1987), Turkish footballer
