= Uğur Aktaş =

Uğur Aktaş may refer to:

- Uğur Aktaş (footballer) (born 1990), Turkish footballer
- Uğur Aktaş (karateka) (born 1995), Turkish karateka
