= Cizrespor =

Football club in Cizre, Turkey

- Full name: Cizre Spor Kulübü
- Founded: 1972
- Dissolved: 2011
- Ground: Cizre İlçe Stadium, Şırnak
- Capacity: 1000
- Chairman: Salih Sefinç (last known)
- Manager: Ender Traş (last known)
- League: Şırnak Amateur First Division
- 2010–11: Amateur First Division, 6th
Home colours	Away colours

Cizrespor with club code 000035 was a sports club located in Cizre in the province of Şırnak, Turkey. The club colors were green and red. Their home ground was the Cizre İlçe Stadium.

== History ==
Cizrespor was founded in 1972 as Cizre Serhat Spor Kulübü and competed initially in the Mardin Amateur Leagues. In 1995 the club name was changed into Cizrespor. The club was dissolved in 2011, after competing in the Şırnak Amateur First Division 2010–11 season along with Cizre Basraspor (club code 016221) which was founded in 2010 and adopted later on the name Cizre Spor.

== Honours ==
- TFF Third League
  - Winners (1): 1999-2000 Group I

== League participations ==
- TFF Second League: 2000-2007
- TFF Third League: 1988-1994, 1995-2000, 2007-2008
- Turkish Regional Amateur League: 1972-1988, 1994-1995, 2008–2011
