= Sancaktepe Stadium =

Football ground in Istanbul

- Sancaktepe Belediyesi 15 Temmuz Stadyumu
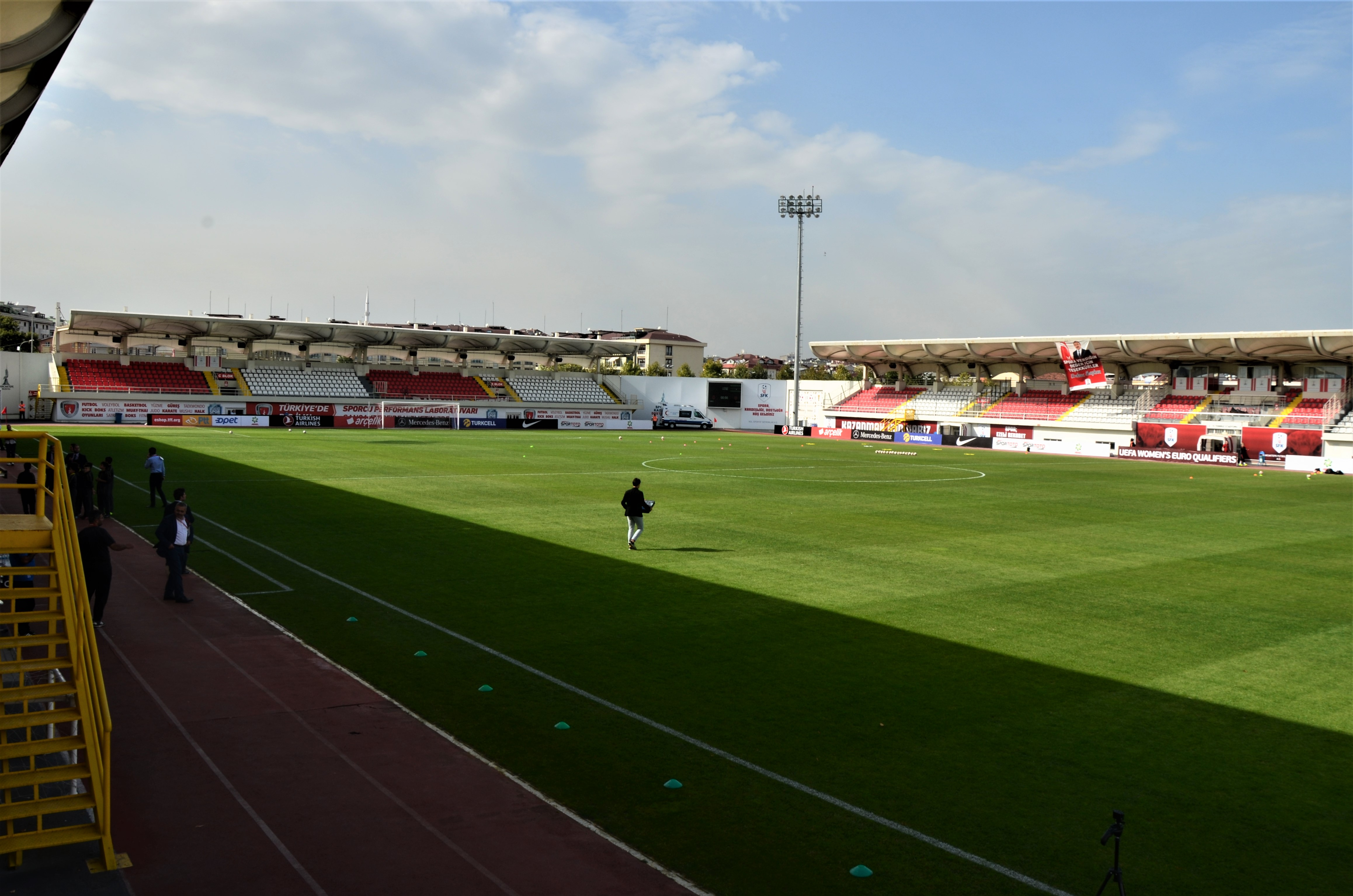
- Sancaktepe Stadium

- Location of Sancaktepe Stadium in Istanbul, Turkey.
- Full name: Sancaktepe Municipality 15 July Stadium
- Former names: Sancaktepe Hakan Şükür Stadium
- Address: Abdurrahmangazi neighborhood, Stad St. 4
- Location: Sancaktepe, Istanbul, Turkey
- Coordinates: 41.00244°N 29.22609°E
- Owner: Sancaltepe Municipality
- Capacity: 1,920
- Type: Stadium
- Event: Football
- Surface: Artificial turf
- Public transit: İETT Bus

Construction
- Built: 2009
- Opened: 2010

Tenant
- Tuzlaspor

Sancaktepe Stadium (Turkish: Sancaktepe Belediyesi 15 Temmuz Stadyumu) is a football stadium in Sancaktepe, a district in Istanbul, Turkey.

== Overview ==
The stadium is situated at Stad Street of Abdurrahmangazi neighborhood in the Sancaktepe district on the Asian side of Istanbul. Built in 2009 and opened in 2010, it is owned by the Sancaktepe municipality, and operated by the Sancaktepe Beledye Sports Club. The stadium has a seating capacity for 1,920 spectators in two grandstands on both sides of the stadium. It is equipped with floodlights for illumination, and its ground is covered by artificial turf. A parking lot for 100 cars is available.

The stadium is home to football club Sancaktepe FK, who currently play in the TFF Second League.

== Name changes ==
The stadium was initially named after the successful football striker Hakan Şükür (born 1971), who entered the parliament in 2011 after his retirement from sport. Known for his links to the Islamic Gülen movement, he resigned from politics after a controversy with the party leader Recep Tayyip Erdoğan. His name was then removed from the stadium. In 2014, it was renamed to "Sancaktepe City Stadium" (Turkish: Sancaktepe Şehir Stadı).

In later time, it was renamed to "Sancaktepe 15 Temmuz Şehitler Stadı" (literally: Sancaktepe 15 July Martyrs Stadium) in honor of the fallen people during the 2016 coup attempt on 15 July.

== International events hosted ==
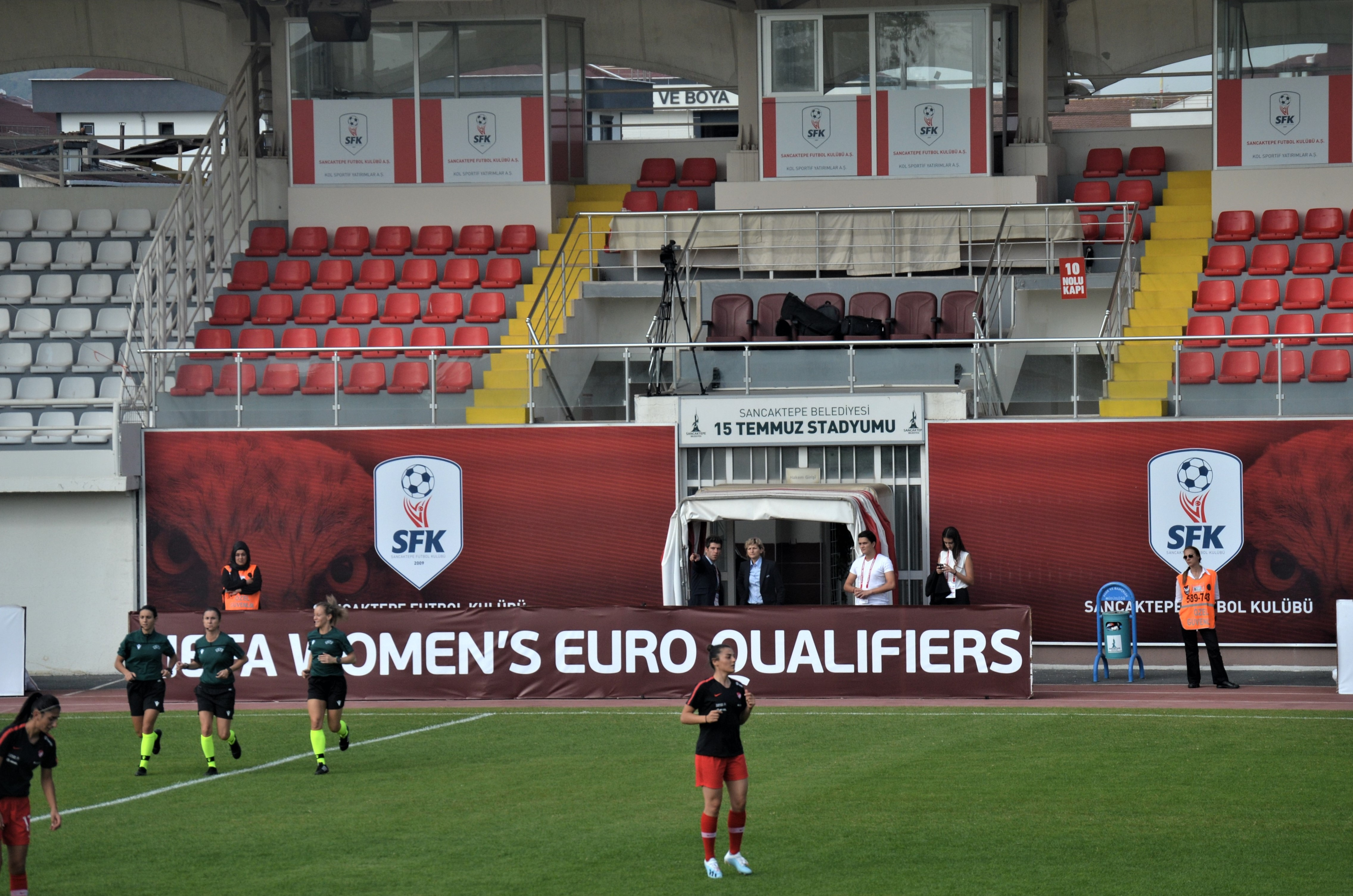
Sancaktepe Stadium haosts UEFA Women's Euro 2021 qualifying match between Turkey and Estonia.

On 4 October 2019, the stadium hosted the UEFA Women's Euro 2021 qualifying Group A match of Turkey against Estonia.
