= İsmail Konuk =

Turkish footballer

Personal information
- Date of birth: 16 January 1988 (age 38)
- Place of birth: Denizli, Turkey
- Height: 1.87 m (6 ft 2 in)
- Position: Defender

Team information
- Current team: Diyarbekirspor
- Number: 4

Senior career*
| Years | Team | Apps | (Gls) |
| 2006–2012 | Denizlispor | 6 | (0) |
| 2006–2007 | → Istanbulspor (loan) | 5 | (0) |
| 2008–2009 | → Denizli Belediyespor (loan) | 36 | (2) |
| 2011–2012 | → Turgutluspor (loan) | 21 | (0) |
| 2012–2013 | Nazilli Belediyespor | 27 | (1) |
| 2013–2016 | Akhisar Belediyespor | 33 | (1) |
| 2016–2018 | Bursaspor | 23 | (1) |
| 2018 | Gazişehir Gaziantep | 13 | (3) |
| 2018–2019 | Adana Demirspor | 10 | (0) |
| 2019–2020 | Boluspor | 29 | (1) |
| 2020–2023 | Tuzlaspor | 67 | (4) |
| 2023– | Diyarbekirspor | 5 | (0) |
- * Club domestic league appearances and goals as of 23 September 2023

İsmail Konuk is a Turkish professional footballer who plays as a defender for Diyarbekirspor. He came through from the Denizlispor youth academy, and made his professional debut in 2006.
