= Gençer Cansev =

Turkish footballer

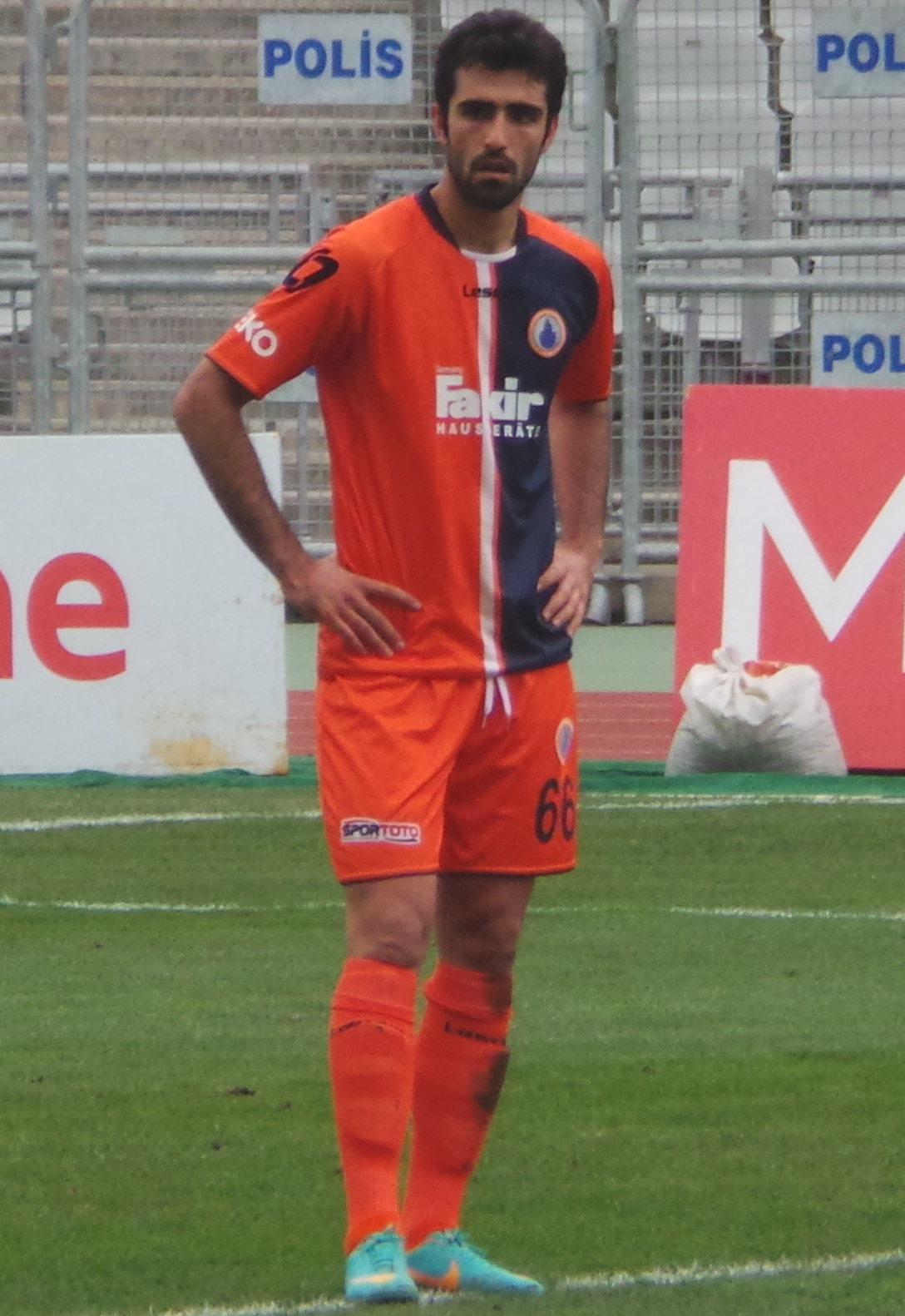

Personal information
- Date of birth: 4 January 1989 (age 37)
- Place of birth: Akdağmadeni, Turkey
- Height: 1.87 m (6 ft 2 in)
- Position: Centre-back

Team information
- Current team: Beykoz Anadolu
- Number: 66

Youth career
- 2001–2007: Küçükköyspor

Senior career*
Years	Team	Apps	(Gls)
2007–2008	Küçükköyspor	27	(2)
2008–2009	Kartalspor	7	(0)
2009–2010	Giresunspor	18	(1)
2010–2013	Boluspor	53	(1)
2013–2017	Başakşehir	32	(1)
2016–2017	→ Göztepe (loan)	44	(2)
2017–2018	Ankaragücü	30	(0)
2018–2021	Altay	41	(2)
2022–2023	Menemenspor	24	(2)
2023–2024	24 Erzincanspor	33	(4)
2024–	Beykoz Anadolu	42	(1)

International career^{‡}
2007	Turkey U18	4	(1)
2007–2008	Turkey U19	3	(0)
- * Club domestic league appearances and goals as of 30 November 2025 ‡ National team caps and goals as of 22:56, 21 August 2021 (UTC)

Gençer Cansev (born 4 January 1989) is a Turkish professional footballer who plays as a centre-back for TFF 2. Lig club Beykoz Anadolu.

== Professional career ==
A youth product of Küçükköyspor, he debuted with the club in the 2007–08 season. He began his early career with Kartalspor, Giresunspor, and Boluspor, before moving to Başakşehir in 2013. He helped them get promoted into the Süper Lig for the 2013–14 season. He made his professional debut for Başakşehir in a 0–0 Süper Lig tie with Konyaspor on 18 October 2014.

He thereafter moved to Ankaragücü, before moving to Altay in 2018. Altay was promoted into the Süper Lig for the 2020–21 season, although Cansev was unable to play as he suffered two consecutive injuries to his cruciate ligaments.

== Honours ==
Başakşehir

- TFF First League: 2013–14
