= Amateur Second Division =

8th and lowest tier of Turkish football

- Organising body: Turkish Football Federation (TFF)
- Country: Turkey
- Confederation: UEFA
- Level on pyramid: 8
- Promotion to: Amateur First Division
- Website: Amateur 2. Division
- Current: 2024–25 Amateur Second Division

The Amateur Second Division (Turkish: İkinci Amatör Küme) comprises a number of football leagues that make up the eighth and lowest tier of the Turkish football league system. Each province has its own league.

== See also ==
- Süper Lig
- TFF First League
- TFF Second League
- TFF Third League
- Turkish Regional Amateur League
- Turkish Cup (since 1962–63)
