= Şamil Çinaz =

German footballer

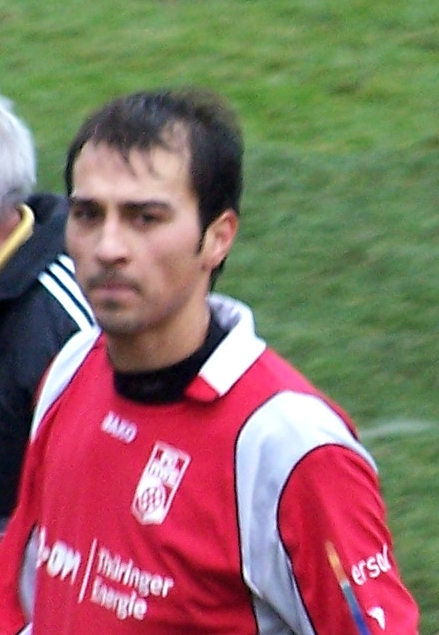
- Çinaz in 2008

Personal information
- Date of birth: 8 March 1986 (age 40)
- Place of birth: Nuremberg, West Germany
- Height: 1.87 m (6 ft 2 in)
- Position: Midfielder

Youth career
- Post SV Nürnberg
- Greuther Fürth
- 2000–2005: 1. FC Nürnberg

Senior career*
Years	Team	Apps	(Gls)
2005–2007	1. FC Nürnberg II	62	(5)
2007–2010	Rot-Weiß Erfurt	96	(7)
2010–2012	FSV Frankfurt	62	(4)
2012–2013	Orduspor	29	(4)
2013–2017	Bursaspor	92	(1)
2017–2019	Kayserispor	0	(0)
Total		341	(21)
- * Club domestic league appearances and goals

Şamil Çinaz (Adyghe: Чыназыр Щамил, romanized: Çınazır Şamil; born 8 March 1986) is a German former professional footballer who played as a midfielder.

== Career ==
Çinaz moved to Orduspor in 2012. He joined Kayserispor in 2017.
