= Turkish football league system =

Status of football leagues in Turkey

The Turkish football system is divided into the following leagues.

== Men ==
=== Süper Lig ===
Süper Lig is the highest level in the Turkish football league system and is operated by the TFF.

=== Other professional divisions ===
The TFF 1. Lig is the second highest level in the Turkish football league system and is operated by the TFF.

The TFF 2. Lig is the third highest level in the Turkish football league system and is operated by the TFF.

The TFF 3. Lig is the fourth highest level in the Turkish football league system and is operated by the TFF.

=== Lower divisions ===
Starting at Level 5.

=== Table ===
Professional leagues
1	Süper Lig; 18 clubs 3 relegations		
2	TFF 1. Lig; 20 clubs 3 promotions, 4 relegations		
3	TFF 2. Lig; White Group; 18 clubs 1-2 promotions, 4 relegations		TFF 2. Lig; Red Group; 18 clubs 1-2 promotions, 4 relegations
4	TFF 3. Lig; Group 1; 18 clubs 1-2 promotions, 4 relegations	TFF 3. Lig; Group 2; 18 clubs 1-2 promotions, 4 relegations	TFF 3. Lig; Group 3; 18 clubs 1-2 promotions, 4 relegations
Non-professional leagues
5	Professional Transition League (formerly Regional Amateur League); 12 promotions, 24+ relegations (occasional)		
6	Super Amateur Leagues; Local		
7	Amateur First Division; Local		
8	Amateur Second Division; Local		

=== Promotion / relegation ===
Promotion and relegation can occur through every league. This means a club in the Professional Transition League may be promoted to the top flight Süper Lig. There are two stages in the promotion process.

==== First stage ====
Provinces which do not have professional clubs send a club or clubs to play. These provinces are:

- 2 clubs: Düzce, Edirne, Kırklareli, Nevşehir
- 1 club: Ağrı, Amasya, Ardahan, Bartın, Bayburt, Bingöl, Bitlis, Hakkari, Muş, Niğde, Sinop, Tunceli

The two clubs which finish first and second gain promotion.

==== Second stage ====
The rest of the amateur clubs join in and play against each other. These provinces are:

- 12 clubs from Istanbul
- 6 clubs from Izmir
- 5 clubs each from Ankara, Balıkesir, Bursa, Kocaeli, Manisa
- 4 clubs each from Aydın, Kütahya, Sakarya
- 3 clubs each from Adana, Afyon, Antalya, Denizli, Eskişehir, Hatay, Kayseri, Konya, Mersin, Tekirdağ, Trabzon, Zonguldak
- 2 clubs each from Bilecik, Çanakkale, Diyarbakır, Elazığ, Erzurum, Giresun, Isparta, Kahramanmaraş, Malatya, Muğla, Ordu, Rize, Samsun, Sivas, Şanlıurfa, Uşak, Van, Yalova
- 1 club each from Adıyaman, Aksaray, Artvin, Batman, Bolu, Burdur, Çankırı, Çorum, Erzincan, Gümüşhane, Iğdır, Karabük, Karaman, Kars, Kastamonu, Kırıkkale, Kırşehir, Kilis, Mardin, Osmaniye, Siirt, Şırnak, Tokat, Yozgat

The play-off winner gains promotion to the TFF 3. Lig.

== See also ==
- League system
