= Alpay Koçaklı =

Turkish footballer

Personal information
- Date of birth: 19 August 1998 (age 28)
- Place of birth: Devrek, Turkey
- Height: 1.80 m (5 ft 11 in)
- Position: Right midfielder

Team information
- Current team: Güzide Gebzespor
- Number: 17

Senior career*
Years	Team	Apps	(Gls)
2014–2015	Karabükspor	1	(0)
2015–2017	Gaziantepspor	10	(1)
2017–2018	Alanyaspor	0	(0)
2018	Adanaspor	2	(0)
2018–2019	Sivas Belediyespor	22	(3)
2019–2020	Giresunspor	11	(0)
2020–2021	Sakaryaspor	21	(0)
2021–2022	Sivas Belediyespor	30	(12)
2022–2023	Şanlıurfaspor	18	(6)
2023–2024	Vanspor	25	(1)
2024–2025	İnegölspor	19	(1)
2025–	Güzide Gebzespor	9	(1)

International career
2013	Turkey U15	2	(0)
2013	Turkey U16	1	(0)
2015	Turkey U17	1	(0)
2015	Turkey U18	2	(0)
2016–2017	Turkey U19	8	(2)
- * Club domestic league appearances and goals as of 9 November 2025

Alpay Koçaklı (born 19 September 1998) is a Turkish footballer who plays as a right midfielder for TFF 2. Lig club Güzide Gebzespor.

== Career ==
Having already featured in three Turkish Cup matches for Karabükspor, Koçaklı made his senior league debut on 29 May 2015, playing the last four minutes in a 4-3 loss to Kayseri Erciyesspor.

== International career ==
Koçaklı has represented Turkey at under-15, under-16, under-17, under-18 and under-19 level.
