= Musa Sinan Yılmazer =

Turkish footballer

Musa
Personal information
- Full name: Musa Sinan Yılmazer
- Date of birth: 31 January 1987 (age 39)
- Place of birth: Adapazarı, Sakarya, Turkey
- Height: 1.78 m (5 ft 10 in)
- Position: Midfielder

Team information
- Current team: Gümüşhanespor

Senior career*
Years	Team	Apps	(Gls)
2005–2007	Sakaryaspor	1	(0)
2007–2008	Sariyer	27	(3)
2008–2010	Denizlispor	20	(0)
2009–2010	→ Altay (loan)	29	(2)
2011	Akhisar Belediyespor	27	(2)
2012	Bandırmaspor	15	(0)
2012–2014	Samsunspor	56	(14)
2014–2016	Sivasspor	25	(2)
2015	→ Yeni Malatyaspor (loan)	13	(0)
2016	→ Kayseri Erciyesspor (loan)	12	(1)
2017	Boluspor	14	(1)
2017–2018	Gümüşhanespor	46	(5)
2019	Manisa BB	5	(1)
2019	Kahramanmaraşspor	0	(0)
2020	Halide Edip Adıvarspor	0	(0)
2020–	Gümüşhanespor	0	(0)
- * Club domestic league appearances and goals as of 6 March 2019

Musa Sinan Yılmazer (born 31 January 1987) is a Turkish footballer who plays for Gümüşhanespor.
