= Uğur Aktaş (footballer) =

Turkish professional footballer

Personal information
- Date of birth: October 3, 1990 (age 36)
- Place of birth: Denizli, Turkey
- Height: 1.80 m (5 ft 11 in)
- Position: Left back

Team information
- Current team: Bugsaşspor
- Number: 33

Senior career*
| Years | Team | Apps | (Gls) |
| 2009–2010 | Denizlispor | 1 | (0) |
| 2010–2013 | Fethiyespor | 63 | (8) |
| 2013–2015 | Giresunspor | 34 | (2) |
| 2015–2016 | Balıkesirspor | 6 | (0) |
| 2016– | Bugsaşspor | 9 | (0) |
- * Club domestic league appearances and goals as of 25 November 2016

Ugur Aktas (born 3 October 1990) is a Turkish professional footballer who plays for Bugsaşspor in the TFF First League.
