= Beykoz Anadoluspor =

Turkish football club

Beykoz Anadolu
- Full name: Beykoz Anadolu Spor Kulübü A.Ş.
- Founded: 1954 (as Tuzlaspor); 2024 (as Beykoz Anadolu)
- Ground: Sancaktepe Stadium, Sancaktepe, Istanbul
- Capacity: 2,581
- Owner: Zeki Aksu
- Chairman: Zeki Aksu
- Manager: Eren Şafak
- League: TFF 3. Lig
- 2025–26: TFF 2. Lig, White, 16th of 19 (relegated)
Home colours	Away colours	Third colours

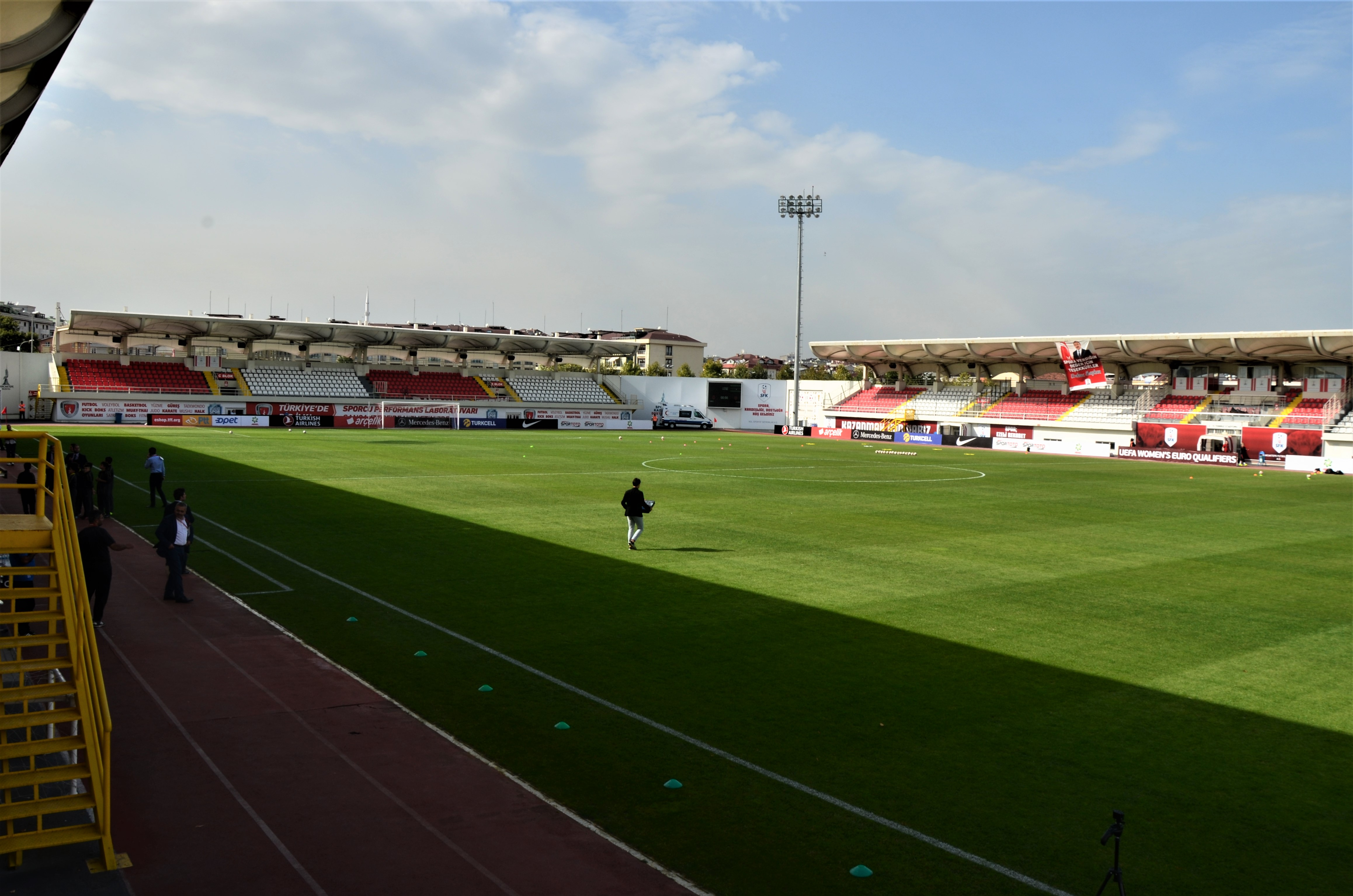
Sancaktepe Stadium, the team's home ground

Beykoz Anadolu Spor Kulübü A.Ş. is a Turkish professional football club based in Beykoz, Istanbul Province. They play in the TFF Second League. The club plays in black and yellow kits.

== History ==
The club was founded as Tuzlaspor in 1954. The club played in white and blue kits, and have done so since their formation, until the 2024–25 season. Businessman Fevzi İlhanlı (also affiliated with Diyarbekirspor) bought the club shares in 2018. In the summer of 2024 the shares of the club and the owner rights where passed to Zeki Aksu. Tuzlaspor made place for the founding of Beykoz Anadolu Spor Kulübü A.Ş..

== League participations ==
- TFF First League: 2020–2024
- TFF Second League: 2015–20, 2024–
- TFF Third League: 2013–15
- Turkish Regional Amateur League: 2012–13
- Turkish Amateur Football League: 1954–2012

== Stadium ==
Currently the team plays at the 2,581 capacity Sancaktepe Stadium.

== Players ==
=== Current squad ===
As of 5 December 2025

Note: Flags indicate national team as defined under FIFA eligibility rules; some limited exceptions apply. Players may hold more than one non-FIFA nationality.

No.	Pos.	Nation	Player
1	GK	TUR	Harun Tekin
2	DF	TUR	Berat Köşker
4	MF	TUR	Doğan Ateş
7	FW	TUR	Melik Derin
8	MF	TUR	Merdan Erdinç
9	FW	TUR	Seçkin Batuhan Fırıncı
10	MF	TUR	Yusuf Akyel
11	FW	TUR	Berkay Sefa Kara
15	MF	TUR	Yunus Mertoğlu
16	FW	TUR	Muhammed İlham Mallayev
17	FW	TUR	Muhammed Enes Durmuş
18	MF	TUR	Zihni Temelci
20	MF	TUR	Baran Zan
22	DF	TUR	Dursun Ali Emirhan Topal
23	MF	TUR	Arda Çağdaş
26	DF	TUR	Onur Arıkan
27	GK	TUR	Anıl Can Bozkuş
28	MF	TUR	Reşo Akın

No.	Pos.	Nation	Player
31	GK	TUR	Görkem Demiryürek
34	DF	NED	Turan Tuzlacık
35	GK	TUR	Kurtuluş Yurt
37	MF	TUR	Utku Kayra Yılmaz
41	GK	TUR	Volkan Mert Korkmaz
46	DF	TUR	Erhan Kara
50	MF	TUR	Efe Geçim
53	FW	TUR	Ozan Papaker
61	MF	TUR	Ahmet Enes Menteşe
62	MF	TUR	Ulaş Oktay Yıldız (on loan from Fatih Karagümrük)
66	DF	TUR	Gençer Cansev
90	DF	TUR	Yusuf Avcılar
95	FW	TUR	Seyfi Boran Özkan
99	FW	TUR	Berat Ali Genç
—	DF	TUR	Alp Koçaş
—	MF	TUR	Yusuf Baran Öner
—	MF	TUR	Ege Türkeri
