= Amateur First Division =

Turkish seventh tier association football

- Organising body: Turkish Football Federation (TFF)
- Country: Turkey
- Confederation: UEFA
- Level on pyramid: 7
- Promotion to: Super Amateur Leagues
- Relegation to: Amateur Second Division
- Website: Amateur 1. Division
- Current: 2025–26 Amateur First Division

The Amateur First Division (Turkish: Amatör Birinci Küme) comprises a number of football leagues that make up the seventh tier of the Turkish football league system. Each province has its own league.

== See also ==
- Süper Lig
- TFF First League
- TFF Second League
- TFF Third League
- Turkish Regional Amateur League
- Turkish Cup (since 1962–63)
